= 2018–19 Quaid-e-Azam Trophy =

Cricket tournament

- Dates: 1 September – 8 December 2018
- Administrator: Pakistan Cricket Board
- Cricket format: First-class
- Tournament format(s): Group stage and Final
- Host: Pakistan
- Champions: Habib Bank Limited (3rd title)
- Participants: 16
- Matches: 69
- Most runs: Khurram Manzoor (886)
- Most wickets: Aizaz Cheema (59)
- Official website: www.pcb.com.pk

The 2018–19 Quaid-e-Azam Trophy was a first-class domestic cricket competition that took place in Pakistan from 1 September to 8 December 2018. Following the conclusion of each match, the teams played each other in a List A fixture in the 2018–19 Quaid-e-Azam One Day Cup tournament. Sui Northern Gas Pipelines Limited were the defending champions.

In April 2018, Zarai Taraqiati Bank Limited (ZTBL) won the Patron's Trophy Grade-II tournament to qualify for this year's edition of the competition. ZTBL won their opening fixture of the Quaid-e-Azam Trophy, against Lahore Blues, by 151 runs.

Prior to the start of the tournament, two players were dropped by their teams. Ahmed Shehzad, captain of Habib Bank Limited (HBL), was left out of HBL's squad after testing positive for the use of a banned substance. Hasan Raza was not selected to play for Pakistan Television, after his alleged involvement in spot-fixing.

During the tournament, the quality of some of the pitches was questioned. This included the fixture between Water and Power Development Authority and Sui Southern Gas Company, which was abandoned on day one due to an unsafe pitch, before it was restarted as a three-day game, and the fixture between Sui Northern Gas Pipelines Limited and Habib Bank Limited, which saw Sui Northern Gas Pipelines Limited being bowled out for just 35 runs in their first innings.

In Pool A, Sui Northern Gas Pipelines Limited, Peshawar, Khan Research Laboratories and Habib Bank Limited all progressed to the Super Eight section of the tournament. They were joined by Sui Southern Gas Corporation, Water and Power Development Authority, Karachi Whites and Lahore Blues from Pool B. The Super Eight fixtures were originally scheduled to take place in Lahore. However, the Pakistan Cricket Board (PCB) moved the matches to Karachi due to bad weather. Meanwhile, Islamabad from Pool A and Zarai Taraqiati Bank Limited from Pool B were both relegated to the second-tier for the next season.

Sui Northern Gas Pipelines and Habib Bank Limited won their respective Super Eight groups to progress to the final of the tournament. For the first time in several years, the final was not shown live on television. Habib Bank Limited won the tournament, despite the final ending as a draw, after they took a first-innings lead in the match.

== Teams ==
The following teams are competing in the 2018–19 tournament:

Regional

- Federally Administered Tribal Areas
- Islamabad
- Karachi Whites
- Lahore Blues
- Lahore Whites
- Multan
- Peshawar
- Rawalpindi

Department

- Habib Bank Limited
- Khan Research Laboratories
- National Bank of Pakistan
- Pakistan Television
- Sui Northern Gas Pipelines Limited
- Sui Southern Gas Company
- Water and Power Development Authority
- Zarai Taraqiati Bank Limited

United Bank Limited, who topped Pool B in previous edition of the competition, were disbanded in July 2018. Faisalabad scored only one point in the previous tournament. Zarai Taraqiati Bank Limited were promoted from the Patron's Trophy Grade-II tournament to replace them. Multan were added to the teams in this years' tournament.

== Points table ==
Pool A

Team	Pld	W	L	D	NR	Pts
Sui Northern Gas Pipelines Limited	7	5	1	1	0	45
Peshawar	7	5	2	0	0	39
Khan Research Laboratories	7	4	2	1	0	33
Habib Bank Limited	7	2	3	2	0	24
National Bank of Pakistan	7	2	3	2	0	23
Federally Administered Tribal Areas	7	2	5	0	0	18
Lahore Whites	7	1	1	5	0	15
Islamabad	7	1	5	1	0	10

Team qualified for the Super Eight

Pool B

Team	Pld	W	L	D	NR	Pts
Sui Southern Gas Corporation	7	4	1	2	0	45
Water and Power Development Authority	7	4	2	1	0	34
Karachi Whites	7	3	1	3	0	34
Lahore Blues	7	3	4	0	0	27
Rawalpindi	7	3	3	1	0	21
Pakistan Television	7	2	4	1	0	18
Multan	7	2	3	2	0	16
Zarai Taraqiati Bank Limited	7	2	5	0	0	15

Team qualified for the Super Eight

== Group stage ==
=== Pool A ===
==== Round 1 ====
1–4 September 2018
Scorecard

Sui Northern Gas Pipelines Limited	v	Lahore Whites
251 (109.5 overs); Iftikhar Ahmed 69 (112); Babar Rehman 4/65 (20 overs)		341 (145 overs); Usman Salahuddin 153* (400); Bilawal Bhatti 4/84 (25 overs)
116/2 (42 overs); Iftikhar Ahmed 52* (84); Mohammad Waheed 1/25 (6 overs)

Match drawn
Lahore City Cricket Association Ground, Lahore
Umpires: Asif Yaqoob and Mohammad Sajid

- Lahore Whites won the toss and elected to field.

1–4 September 2018
Scorecard

Peshawar	v	Khan Research Laboratories
278 (99 overs); Akbar Badshah 114* (259); Nauman Ali 6/62 (33 overs)		224 (103 overs); Jaahid Ali 52 (131); Taj Wali 5/24 (14 overs)
122 (64.4 overs); Akbar Badshah 33 (118); Nauman Ali 6/52 (24.4 overs)		98 (42.1 overs); Azeem Ghumman 28 (48); Taj Wali 4/31 (12 overs)

Peshawar won by 78 runs
Khan Research Laboratory Ground, Rawalpindi
Umpires: Mohammad Asif and Shozab Raza

- Khan Research Laboratories won the toss and elected to field.

1–4 September 2018
Scorecard

Islamabad	v	Habib Bank Limited
348 (89.3 overs); Rohail Nazir 130 (194); Umar Gul 3/34 (9 overs)		355 (112.4 overs); Rameez Aziz 87 (208); Mohammad Nadeem 5/90 (20.4 overs)
143 (54.2 overs); Faizan Riaz 31 (51); Amad Butt 3/35 (13 overs)		137/3 (24.3 overs); Umar Akmal 87* (68); Ahmed Safi Abdullah 2/33 (5 overs)

Habib Bank Limited won by 7 wickets
Diamond Club Ground, Islamabad
Umpires: Rashid Riaz and Nasir Hussain

- Islamabad won the toss and elected to bat.
- Rohail Nazir, Mohammad Arham, Mohammad Nadeem (Islamabad) and Saad Khan (Habib Bank Limited) all made their first-class debuts.

1–4 September 2018
Scorecard

Federally Administered Tribal Areas	v	National Bank of Pakistan
247 (98 overs); Afaq Raheem 103 (238); Mir Hamza 6/42 (24 overs)		434/7d (115.4 overs); Kamran Ghulam 101* (173); Adnan Ghaus 3/123 (28 overs)
130 (56 overs); Mohammad Naeem 23 (27); Mohammad Asghar 3/19 (12 overs)

National Bank of Pakistan won by an innings and 57 runs
Abbottabad Cricket Stadium, Abbottabad
Umpires: Saqib Khan and Farooq Ali Khan

- National Bank of Pakistan won the toss and elected to field.

==== Round 2 ====
8–11 September 2018
Scorecard

National Bank of Pakistan	v	Lahore Whites
273 (104.2 overs); Ali Asad 103 (157); Mohammad Irfan 5/80 (43 overs)		68 (53.2 overs); Mohammad Irfan 13 (27); Bilal Asif 4/16 (18 overs)
48/0 (11 overs); Rameez Raja 26* (34)

Match drawn
Lahore City Cricket Association Ground, Lahore
Umpires: Majid Hussain and Mohammad Sajid

- Lahore Whites won the toss and elected to field.
- No play was possible on day 3.
- Bilal Anwar (Lahore Whites) made his first-class debut.

8–11 September 2018
Scorecard

Habib Bank Limited	v	Peshawar
228 (73.3 overs); Abid Ali 71 (139); Zahid Mahmood 4/59 (16.3 overs)		193 (59.3 overs); Israrullah 74 (123); Agha Salman 4/15 (12.3 overs)
122 (30.3 overs); Imran Farhat 23 (22); Sajid Khan 3/25 (7.3 overs)		159/4 (40 overs); Ashfaq Ahmed 68* (107); Abdur Rehman 2/47 (16.2 overs)

Peshawar won by 6 wickets
Khan Research Laboratory Ground, Rawalpindi
Umpires: Asif Yaqoob and Mohammad Asif

- Habib Bank Limited won the toss and elected to bat.

8–11 September 2018
Scorecard

Islamabad	v	Khan Research Laboratories
88 (38.3 overs); Ali Sarfraz 25 (54); Ahmed Bashir 6/26 (13.3 overs)		176 (57.4 overs); Usman Arshad 58 (125); Mohammad Nadeem 5/59 (20.4 overs)
118 (34.5 overs); Shehzad Azam 27 (42); Ali Shafiq 5/42 (11 overs)		31/0 (11.4 overs); Azeem Ghumman 20* (39)

Khan Research Laboratories won by 10 wickets
Diamond Club Ground, Islamabad
Umpires: Waseemuddin and Nasir Hussain

- Khan Research Laboratories won the toss and elected to field.

8–11 September 2018
Scorecard

Sui Northern Gas Pipelines Limited	v	Federally Administered Tribal Areas
461/8d (117 overs); Iftikhar Ahmed 145 (175); Adnan Ghaus 4/113 (26 overs)		266 (102 overs); Samiullah 104* (243); Rahat Ali 5/78 (25 overs)
		143 (50 overs) (f/o); Mohammad Talha 31 (23); Mohammad Hafeez 6/62 (21 overs)

Sui Northern Gas Pipelines Limited won by an innings and 52 runs
Abbottabad Cricket Stadium, Abbottabad
Umpires: Saqib Khan and Farooq Ali Khan

- Sui Northern Gas Pipelines Limited won the toss and elected to bat.

==== Round 3 ====
15–18 September 2018
Scorecard

Habib Bank Limited	v	Lahore Whites
386 (115.3 overs); Abid Ali 131 (254); Saif-ur-Rehman 4/81 (24 overs)		340 (139.4 overs); Ali Rafiq 121 (263); Zohaib Khan 5/50 (38 overs)
234/7 (84 overs); Zohaib Khan 59 (131); Mohammad Irfan 5/81 (39 overs)

Match drawn
Gaddafi Stadium, Lahore
Umpires: Mohammad Sajid and Sultan Mahmood

- Lahore Whites won the toss and elected to field.

15–18 September 2018
Scorecard

National Bank of Pakistan	v	Peshawar
106 (38 overs); Rameez Raja 29 (37); Altaf Ahmed 3/20 (10 overs)		127 (40.4 overs); Ashfaq Ahmed 35 (32); Ataullah 5/29 (10 overs)
88 (33.1 overs); Mir Hamza 25 (23); Nasir Ahmed 5/24 (8 overs)		68/2 (14.5 overs); Israrullah 22 (37); Mir Hamza 1/11 (5 overs)

Peshawar won by 8 wickets
Iqbal Stadium, Faisalabad
Umpires: Shozab Raza and Waleed Yaqub

- Peshawar won the toss and elected to field.
- Idrees Shah (Peshawar) made his first-class debut.

15–18 September 2018
Scorecard

Islamabad	v	Sui Northern Gas Pipelines Limited
108 (36 overs); Mohammad Nadeem 36 (33); Azizullah 4/36 (13 overs)		591/4d (138 overs); Asad Shafiq 221* (349); Samiullah Mehsud 2/131 (32.5 overs)
176 (55.2 overs); Sarmad Bhatti 67* (105); Azizullah 2/23 (13.2 overs)

Sui Northern Gas Pipelines Limited won by an innings and 307 runs
Diamond Club Ground, Islamabad
Umpires: Ghaffar Kazmi and Mohammad Asif

- Sui Northern Gas Pipelines Limited won the toss and elected to field.
- Rizwan Ali and Samiullah Mehsud (Islamabad) both made their first-class debuts.

15–18 September 2018
Scorecard

Federally Administered Tribal Areas	v	Khan Research Laboratories
253 (67.4 overs); Asad Afridi 97 (84); Ali Shafiq 8/70 (19.4 overs)		248 (76.5 overs); Usman Arshad 49 (104); Asif Afridi 4/62 (20.5 overs)
172 (60.4 overs); Asad Afridi 70 (111); Ali Shafiq 4/50 (18 overs)		181/3 (45.5 overs); Jaahid Ali 65 (96); Hafidullah 2/46 (7 overs)

Khan Research Laboratories won by 7 wickets
Abbottabad Cricket Stadium, Abbottabad
Umpires: Saqib Khan and Farooq Ali Khan

- Federally Administered Tribal Areas won the toss and elected to bat.
- Hafidullah and Zulqarnain (Federally Administered Tribal Areas) both made their first-class debuts.

==== Round 4 ====
25–28 September 2018
Scorecard

Peshawar	v	Sui Northern Gas Pipelines Limited
176 (48.2 overs); Israrullah 42 (81); Bilawal Bhatti 6/38 (9.2 overs)		472 (130.4 overs); Mohammad Hafeez 213 (327); Taj Wali 5/106 (33.4 overs)
191 (39.2 overs); Sajid Khan 54 (61); Mohammad Hafeez 3/41 (8.2 overs)

Sui Northern Gas Pipelines Limited won by an innings and 105 runs
Iqbal Stadium, Faisalabad
Umpires: Sultan Mahmood and Mohammad Asif

- Sui Northern Gas Pipelines Limited won the toss and elected to field.

25–28 September 2018
Scorecard

Islamabad	v	National Bank of Pakistan
167 (49.5 overs); Arsal Sheikh 34* (43); Hammad Azam 4/24 (10 overs)		454 (101.4 overs); Hammad Azam 157 (221); Mohammad Nadeem 4/121 (27)
125 (33.2 overs); Faizan Riaz 30 (28); Atif Jabbar 4/26 (9 overs)

National Bank won by an innings and 162 runs
Diamond Club Ground, Islamabad
Umpires: Aaley Haider and Imtiaz Iqbal

- National Bank of Pakistan won the toss and elected to field.
- Zawan Hikmat, Ali Salman and Farmanullah Khan (Islamabad) all made their first-class debuts.

25–28 September 2018
Scorecard

Federally Administered Tribal Areas	v	Habib Bank Limited
437 (97.2 overs); Asif Afridi 112 (103); Khurram Shehzad 6/162 (28 overs)		356 (113 overs); Zohaib Khan 73 (150); Mohammad Talha 4/85 (27 overs)
258/8d (80.2 overs); Mohammad Talha 54* (75); Amad Butt 4/76 (15.2 overs)		106 (29.1 overs); Umar Akmal 36 (27); Asif Afridi 6/36 (14.1 overs)

Federally Administered Tribal Areas won by 233 runs
Abbottabad Cricket Stadium, Abbottabad
Umpires: Saqib Khan and Farooq Ali Khan

- Habib Bank Limited won the toss and elected to field.
- Mohammad Tayyab (Federally Administered Tribal Areas) made his first-class debut.

25–28 September 2018
Scorecard

Lahore Whites	v	Khan Research Laboratories
182 (100.1 overs); Afaq Shahid 51 (172); Yasir Ali 5/23 (19 overs)		166 (66.5 overs); Gulraiz Sadaf 58 (95); Mohammad Irfan 5/47 (24.5 overs)
177 (92.3 overs); Ali Rafiq 60 (209); Sameen Gul 4/31 (18 overs)		90/4 (55 overs); Azeem Ghumman 35 (160); Waqas Ahmed 2/21 (9.5 overs)

Match drawn
Lahore City Cricket Association Ground, Lahore
Umpires: Khalid Mahmood and Shameem Ansari

- Lahore Whites won the toss and elected to bat.
- Afaq Shahid (Lahore Whites) made his first-class debut.

==== Round 5 ====
3–6 October 2018
Scorecard

Peshawar	v	Lahore Whites
295 (77.2 overs); Ashfaq Ahmed 89 (125); Waqas Ahmed 4/77 (23 overs)		271 (109 overs); Ali Rafiq 80 (185); Taj Wali 4/77 (36 overs)
156 (37.2 overs); Nasir Ahmed 45* (42); Bilal Anwar 5/46 (11 overs)		184/9 (52 overs); Ali Zaryab Asif 47 (119); Sajid Khan 6/35 (13 overs)

Lahore Whites won by 1 wicket
Gaddafi Stadium, Lahore
Umpires: Majid Hussain and Sultan Mahmood

- Lahore Whites won the toss and elected to field

3–6 October 2018
Scorecard

Islamabad	v	Federally Administered Tribal Areas
543 (146 overs); Ali Sarfraz 185 (225); Mohammad Talha 4/161 (40 overs)		275 (90 overs); Saeed Khan 64 (113); Mohammad Nadeem 3/55 (15 overs)
		108 (40.5 overs) (f/o); Asif Afridi 29 (66); Hazrat Shah 7/35 (16.5 overs)

Islamabad won by an innings and 160 runs
Diamond Club Ground, Islamabad
Umpires: Aaley Haider and Zameer Haider

- Federally Administered Tribal Areas won the toss and elected to field.
- Saeed Khan (Federally Administered Tribal Areas) made his first-class debut.

3–6 October 2018
Scorecard

Sui Northern Gas Pipelines Limited	v	National Bank of Pakistan
265 (85.4 overs); Adnan Akmal 51 (84); Atif Jabbar 3/53 (20.4 overs)		44 (17.3 overs); Mushtaq Ahmed 16* (10); Samiullah Khan 6/11 (6 overs)
164 (55.4 overs); Hussain Talat 34 (55); Mohammad Asghar 4/35 (13.4 overs)		183 (58.3 overs); Rameez Raja 37 (74); Imran Khalid 3/38 (11 overs)

Sui Northern Gas Pipelines Limited won by 202 runs
Iqbal Stadium, Faisalabad
Umpires: Ghaffar Kazmi and Tahir Rasheed

- National Bank of Pakistan won the toss and elected to field.

3–6 October 2018
Scorecard

Khan Research Laboratories	v	Habib Bank Limited
235 (67.5 overs); Mohammad Mohsin 103* (126); Rameez Aziz 2/13 (4 overs)		159 (43.4 overs); Umar Akmal 33 (39); Sadaf Hussain 4/54 (15.4 overs)
116 (50.3 overs); Jaahid Ali 28 (47); Umar Gul 5/34 (13.3 overs)		157 (48.4 overs); Mohammad Waqas 32 (69); Sameen Gul 5/50 (15 overs)

Khan Research Laboratories won by 35 runs
Khan Research Laboratory Ground, Rawalpindi
Umpires: Khalid Mahmood and Imtiaz Iqbal

- Habib Bank Limited won the toss and elected to field.
- Sajjad Ali and Abbas Afridi (Habib Bank Limited) both made their first-class debuts.

==== Round 6 ====
11–14 October 2018
Scorecard

Federally Administered Tribal Areas	v	Lahore Whites
335 (98.5 overs); Asad Afridi 91 (104); Waqas Ahmed 5/142 (29.5 overs)		180 (71.3 overs); Mohammad Irfan 63 (95); Asif Afridi 6/39 (27.3 overs)
114/7 (32.3 overs); Samiullah 29 (72); Waqas Ahmed 3/32 (11.3 overs)		266 (84.5 overs) (f/o); Mohammad Irfan 74 (148); Asif Afridi 4/54 (30 overs)

Federally Administered Tribal Areas won by 3 wickets
Lahore City Cricket Association Ground, Lahore
Umpires: Tariq Rasheed and Shameem Ansari

- Federally Administered Tribal Areas won the toss and elected to bat.
- Hayatullah (Federally Administered Tribal Areas) made his first-class debut.

11–14 October 2018
Scorecard

Islamabad	v	Peshawar
276 (76.4 overs); Ali Salman 60 (127); Mohammad Ilyas 5/69 (21 overs)		82 (27.3 overs); Musadiq Ahmed 13 (25); Hazrat Shah 6/22 (10.3 overs)
179 (48.2 overs); Ali Sarfraz 52 (51); Mohammad Ilyas 5/61 (12.2 overs)		377/5 (90.1 overs); Mohammad Mohsin 140 (238); Mohammad Nadeem 3/75 (18 overs)

Peshawar won by 5 wickets
Diamond Club Ground, Islamabad
Umpires: Ghaffar Kazmi and Tahir Shah

- Peshawar won the toss and elected to field.
- Nabi Gul and Mohammad Ilyas (Peshawar) both made their first-class debuts.

11–14 October 2018
Scorecard

National Bank of Pakistan	v	Khan Research Laboratories
139 (46.3 overs); Shan Masood 19 (33); Sadaf Hussain 5/44 (16.3 overs)		347 (103.4 overs); Hasan Raza 165 (284); Hammad Azam 4/102 (29 overs)
240 (73 overs); Rameez Raja 74 (94); Sameen Gul 3/54 (19 overs)		35/1 (7 overs); Azeem Ghumman 19 (22); Ataullah 1/12 (4 overs)

Khan Research Laboratories won by 9 wickets
Khan Research Laboratory Ground, Rawalpindi
Umpires: Aaley Haider and Abdul Muqeet

- National Bank of Pakistan won the toss and elected to bat.

11–14 October 2018
Scorecard

Habib Bank Limited	v	Sui Northern Gas Pipelines Limited
270 (76.4 overs); Imran Farhat 75 (103); Imran Khalid 4/48 (18.4 overs)		35 (22.2 overs); Bilawal Bhatti 15 (26); Junaid Khan 7/17 (11 overs)
233 (69.2 overs); Imran Farhat 62 (118); Asad Ali 4/57 (17.2 overs)		220 (58.4 overs); Imran Khalid 62* (75); Abdur Rehman 4/85 (17 overs)

Habib Bank Limited won by 248 runs
Iqbal Stadium, Faisalabad
Umpires: Ahmed Shahab and Nasir Hussain

- Habib Bank Limited won the toss and elected to bat.

==== Round 7 ====
19–22 October 2018
Scorecard

Habib Bank Limited	v	National Bank of Pakistan
404 (111 overs); Umar Akmal 129 (166); Atif Jabbar 5/100 (28 overs)		176 (62.2 overs); Ali Asad 69 (170); Khurram Shehzad 6/37 (21 overs)
490/6d (106.5 overs); Imran Farhat 128 (160); Ataullah 3/77 (16 overs)		120/4 (33 overs); Kamran Ghulam 51* (82); Abbas Afridi 2/15 (4 overs)

Match drawn
Iqbal Stadium, Faisalabad
Umpires: Ahmed Shahab and Nasir Hussain

- Habib Bank Limited won the toss and elected to bat.

19–22 October 2018
Scorecard

Sui Northern Gas Pipelines Limited	v	Khan Research Laboratories
216 (65.2 overs); Misbah-ul-Haq 66 (131); Haris Asif 4/66 (15 overs)		343 (120.5 overs); Shoaib Ahmed 102* (106); Azizullah 4/49 (25.5 overs)
241 (85.1 overs); Misbah-ul-Haq 76 (155); Nauman Ali 5/55 (24.1 overs)		104 (30.4 overs); Nauman Ali 27 (27); Imran Khalid 4/42 (8.4 overs)

Sui Northern Gas Pipelines Limited won by 10 runs
Khan Research Laboratory Ground, Rawalpindi
Umpires: Aaley Haider and Ghaffar Kazmi

- Khan Research Laboratories won the toss and elected to field.

19–22 October 2018
Scorecard

Islamabad	v	Lahore Whites
425 (131.2 overs); Ali Sarfraz 102 (131); Nauman Anwar 5/30 (10.2 overs)		465 (144.5 overs); Ali Zaryab Asif 112 (253); Shehzad Azam 3/94 (32 overs)
190 (33.1 overs); Ali Sarfraz 65 (56); Waqas Ahmed 4/46 (9 overs)		69/2 (14 overs); Ali Rafiq 34* (47); Shehzad Azam 2/25 (7 overs)

Match drawn
Gaddafi Stadium, Lahore
Umpires: Shameem Ansari and Imtiaz Iqbal

- Lahore Whites won the toss and elected to field.

19–22 October 2018
Scorecard

Peshawar	v	Federally Administered Tribal Areas
235 (62 overs); Israrullah 133* (165); Asif Afridi 3/32 (11 overs)		171 (43.2 overs); Basit Afridi 47 (90); Mohammad Ilyas 4/63 (15.2 overs)
603 (122.2 overs); Musadiq Ahmed 186 (204); Abdul Rauf 3/140 (25.2 overs)		183 (27.4 overs); Mohammad Talha 55 (32); Israrullah 2/7 (1.4 overs)

Peshawar won by 484 runs
Abbottabad Cricket Stadium, Abbottabad
Umpires: Abdul Muqeet and Tahir Shah

- Peshawar won the toss and elected to bat.
- Saeedullah, Mohammad Arif, Basit Afridi, Rehmanullah and Abdul Rauf (Federally Administered Tribal Areas) all made their first-class debuts.

=== Pool B ===
==== Round 1 ====
1–4 September 2018
Scorecard

Zarai Taraqiati Bank Limited	v	Lahore Blues
121 (46.4 overs); Aqib Shah 55* (124); Aizaz Cheema 4/21 (10 overs)		123 (54.2 overs); Farhan Khan 42 (87); Haseeb-ur-Rehman 4/9 (6.2 overs)
230 (87.3 overs); Haseeb-ur-Rehman 48 (128); Aizaz Cheema 4/43 (16.3 overs)		77 (31.4 overs); Saad Nasim 17 (29); Haseeb-ur-Rehman 6/43 (15.4 overs)

Zarai Taraqiati Bank Limited won by 151 runs
Iqbal Stadium, Faisalabad
Umpires: Imran Javed and Faisal Afridi

- Lahore Blues won the toss and elected to field.
- Mohammad Umar (Lahore Blues), Mohammad Ali and Naseem Shah (cricketer)\Naseem Shah (Zarai Taraqiati Bank Limited) all made their first-class debuts.

1–4 September 2018
Scorecard

Water and Power Development Authority	v	Karachi Whites
245 (63.2 overs); Adnan Raees 53 (100); Adeel Malik 4/88 (19 overs)		292 (96.2 overs); Asad Baig 76 (192); Hasnain Shah 4/63 (18 overs)
180 (68.1 overs); Ayaz Tasawwar 85 (207); Adeel Malik 5/32 (20.1 overs)		134/2 (34.2 overs); Khurram Manzoor 62 (86); Ehsan Adil 1/24 (5 overs)

Karachi Whites won by 8 wickets
National Stadium, Karachi
Umpires: Qaiser Waheed and Tariq Rasheed

- Karachi Whites won the toss and elected to field.
- Kashif Iqbal, Mohammad Umar and Ismail Khan (Karachi Whites) all made their first-class debuts.

1–4 September 2018
Scorecard

Sui Southern Gas Company	v	Rawalpindi
349 (104.5 overs); Umar Amin 154 (231); Saad Altaf 6/88 (28.5 overs)		153 (60.3 overs); Naved Malik 58 (119); Kashif Bhatti 4/17 (12.3 overs)
175/3d (36 overs); Sami Aslam 100* (135); Haseeb Azam 1/29 (7 overs)		224 (79.5 overs); Haseeb Azam 70 (136); Sohail Khan 6/57 (20.5 overs)

Sui Southern Gas Company won by 147 runs
Pindi Club Ground, Rawalpindi
Umpires: Ahmed Shahab and Abdul Muqeet

- Sui Southern Gas Company won the toss and elected to bat.

1–4 September 2018
Scorecard

Pakistan Television	v	Multan
281 (105.4 overs); Umair Khan 68 (145); Mohammad Irfan 5/37 (16.4 overs)		166 (73.5 overs); Waqas Hussain 43 (78); Aamer Jamal 4/28 (19 overs)
236/5d (59 overs); Saud Shakeel 108* (128); Ahsan Baig 2/59 (9 overs)		295/9 (116 overs); Khalilullah 97 (185); Raza Hasan 5/81 (39 overs)

Match drawn
Multan Cricket Stadium, Multan
Umpires: Zameer Haider and Tahir Shah

- Multan won the toss and elected to field.
- Mohammad Ali Khan (Multan), Aamer Jamal and Mohammad Hasnain (Pakistan Television) all made their first-class debuts.

==== Round 2 ====
8–11 September 2018
Scorecard

Zarai Taraqiati Bank Limited	v	Rawalpindi
173 (56 overs); Anas Mustafa 55 (87); Tauseeq Shah 4/49 (18 overs)		115 (48.4 overs); Haseeb Azam 40 (116); Mohammad Ali 5/31 (14)
71 (29.4 overs); Mohammad Aamer 25 (57); Tauseeq Shah 4/15 (8 overs)		131/5 (49.5 overs); Asif Ali 68* (109); Imran Khan 3/43 (15.5 overs)

Rawalpindi won by 5 wickets
Pindi Club Ground, Rawalpindi
Umpires: Abdul Muqeet and Rashid Riaz

- Rawalpindi won the toss and elected to field.
- Tauseeq Shah (Rawalpindi), Anas Mustafa, Mohammad Aamer, Salahuddin and Haris Majeed (Zarai Taraqiati Bank Limited) all made their first-class debuts.

8–11 September 2018
Scorecard

Multan	v	Water and Power Development Authority
290 (128 overs); Imran Rafiq 65 (162); Waqas Maqsood 3/39 (25 overs)		288 (96.2 overs); Adnan Raees 91 (208); Mohammad Ali Khan 3/26 (18 overs)
167 (79.4 overs); Zeeshan Ashraf 26 (50); Khalid Usman 5/37 (28.4 overs)		175/3 (43.5 overs); Ali Shan 96* (109); Asif Fawad 1/28 (10 overs)

Water and Power Development Authority won by 7 wickets
Multan Cricket Stadium, Multan
Umpires: Tahir Shah and Zameer Haider

- Water and Power Development Authority won the toss and elected to field.
- Saif-ur-Rehman, Ahmar Ashfaq (Multan) and Waqar Malik (Water and Power Development Authority) all made their first-class debuts.

8–11 September 2018
Scorecard

Pakistan Television	v	Lahore Blues
261 (70.2 overs); Mohammad Waqas 101 (151); Aizaz Cheema 6/57 (15.2 overs)		204 (68.4 overs); Zafar Gohar 76 (167); Tabish Khan 8/41 (27.4 overs)
252/4d (59 overs); Umair Khan 89 (158); Zafar Gohar 2/43 (12 overs)		264 (80.1 overs); Irfan Haider 66* (137); Raza Hasan 4/63 (30.1 overs)

Pakistan Television won by 45 runs
Iqbal Stadium, Faisalabad
Umpires: Imran Javed and Faisal Afridi

- Lahore Blues won the toss and elected to field.

8–11 September 2018
Scorecard

Karachi Whites	v	Sui Southern Gas Company
338 (92.2 overs); Mohammad Hasan 125 (163); Kashif Bhatti 3/78 (33 overs)		531/9d (176 overs); Fawad Alam 141* (390); Waleed Ahmed 6/155 (56 overs)
230/6 (75 overs); Mohammad Hasan 100* (166); Ahmed Jamal 3/66 (15 overs)

Match drawn
National Stadium, Karachi
Umpires: Qaiser Waheed and Tariq Rasheed

- Sui Southern Gas Corporation won the toss and elected to field.
- Waleed Ahmed (Karachi Whites) made his first-class debut.

==== Round 3 ====
15–18 September 2018
Scorecard

Zarai Taraqiati Bank Limited	v	Karachi Whites
207 (75.4 overs); Usman Ashraf 86* (105); Adeel Malik 4/38 (20 overs)		461 (113 overs); Khurram Manzoor 199 (204); Imran Khan 4/91 (26 overs)
175 (98 overs); Anas Mustafa 48 (90); Anwar Ali 5/33 (21 overs)

Karachi Whites won by an innings and 79 runs
National Stadium, Karachi
Umpires: Qaiser Waheed and Tariq Rasheed

- Zarai Taraqiati Bank Limited won the toss and elected to bat.
- Omair Yousuf and Israr Ahmed (Karachi Whites) both made their first-class debuts.

15–18 September 2018
Scorecard

Rawalpindi	v	Pakistan Television
392 (131.5 overs); Tayyab Riaz 68 (242); Tabish Khan 4/123 (30.5 overs)		116 (33.5 overs); Aamer Jamal 48 (54); Tauseeq Shah 5/30 (10 overs)
48/0 (13.1 overs); Sarmad Hameed 29* (42)		320 (111.5 overs) (f/o); Mohammad Waqas 81 (179); Tauseeq Shah 4/103 (43.5 overs)

Rawalpindi won by 10 wickets
Pindi Club Ground, Rawalpindi
Umpires: Ahmed Shahab and Rashid Riaz

- Pakistan Television won the toss and elected to field.

15–18 September 2018
Scorecard

Multan	v	Sui Southern Gas Company
143 (68 overs); Imran Rafiq 44 (101); Kashif Bhatti 5/33 (19 overs)		170 (48.1 overs); Awais Zia 42 (83); Ali Usman 4/42 (17.1 overs)
180 (57.1 overs); Khalilullah 54 (81); Aamer Yamin 3/12 (5.1 overs)		107 (38.3 overs); Awais Zia 40 (71); Sajjad Hussain 5/25 (12 overs)

Multan won by 46 runs
Multan Cricket Stadium, Multan
Umpires: Zameer Haider and Adnan Rasheed

- Multan won the toss and elected to bat.

15–18 September 2018
Scorecard

Water and Power Development Authority	v	Lahore Blues
326 (122.4 overs); Salman Butt 129 (273); Zafar Gohar 5/100 (45.4 overs)		149 (76.1 overs); Mohammad Ilyas 41 (120); Khalid Usman 6/47 (19.1 overs)
		161 (46.4 overs) (f/o); Hamza Nazar 59* (103); Khalid Usman 5/57 (17.4 overs)

Water and Power Development Authority won by an innings and 16 runs
Lahore City Cricket Association Ground, Lahore
Umpires: Majid Hussain and Faisal Afridi

- Water and Power Development Authority won the toss and elected to bat.
- Mohammad Ilyas and Mohammad Rameez (Lahore Blues) both made their first-class debuts.

==== Round 4 ====
25–28 September 2018
Scorecard

Pakistan Television	v	Karachi Whites
154 (59.4 overs); Adnan Mehmood 62 (159); Waqar Anwar 6/43 (15.4 overs)		223 (85.3 overs); Khurram Manzoor 89 (208); Mohammad Irfan 5/77 (16.3 overs)
120 (46.2 overs); Umair Khan 32 (67); Israr Ahmed 6/30 (10.2 overs)		52/3 (20 overs); Asad Baig 17 (25); Azharullah 3/24 (8 overs)

Karachi Whites won by 7 wickets
National Stadium, Karachi
Umpires: Qaiser Waheed and Mohammad Asif

- Pakistan Television won the toss and elected to bat.

25–28 September 2018
Scorecard

Rawalpindi	v	Water and Power Development Authority
110 (32.3 overs); Sarmad Hameed 19 (19); Mohammad Asif 5/43 (13 overs)		127 (45.5 overs); Ayaz Tasawwar 51 (97); Saad Altaf 5/35 (17 overs)
227 (83.1 overs); Usman Saeed 76 (187); Ehsan Adil 5/74 (20 overs)		211/3 (58.4 overs); Salman Butt 96 (147); Asad Raza 1/57 (12 overs)

Water and Power Development Authority won by 7 wickets
Pindi Club Ground, Rawalpindi
Umpires: Tahir Rasheed and Waleed Yaqub

- Water and Power Development Authority won the toss and elected to field.

25–28 September 2018
Scorecard

Zarai Taraqiati Bank Limited	v	Multan
223 (89.4 overs); Waqas Saleem 43 (96); Mohammad Ali Khan 3/46 (21 overs)		486/9d (154 overs); Imran Rafiq 148 (319); Imran Khan 3/56 (32 overs)
179 (57.1 overs); Haseeb-ur-Rehman 44 (51); Ahsan Baig 4/44 (12.1 overs)

Multan won by an innings and 84 runs
Multan Cricket Stadium, Multan
Umpires: Riazuddin and Adnan Rasheed

- Zarai Taraqiati Bank Limited won the toss and elected to bat.
- Aun Abbas, Shahrukh Ali, Mansoor Ali and Haider Ali (Zarai Taraqiati Bank Limited) all made their first-class debuts.

25–28 September 2018
Scorecard

Sui Southern Gas Company	v	Lahore Blues
360 (94.2 overs); Fawad Alam 153 (215); Aizaz Cheema 5/45 (19.2 overs)		148 (34 overs); Zubair Malik 33 (46); Zia-ul-Haq 4/37 (14 overs)
		127 (40.2 overs) (f/o); Saad Nasim 46 (47); Kashif Bhatti 6/59 (15.2 overs)

Sui Southern Gas Company won by an innings and 85 runs
Gaddafi Stadium, Lahore
Umpires: Mohammad Sajid and Aslam Bareach

- Sui Southern Gas Corporation won the toss and elected to bat.
- Zubair Malik (Lahore Blues) made his first-class debut.

==== Round 5 ====
3–6 October 2018
Scorecard

Sui Southern Gas Company	v	Pakistan Television
375 (96 overs); Adil Amin 84 (121); Azharullah 7/92 (29 overs)		77 (22.5 overs); Adnan Mehmood 20 (12); Kashif Bhatti 3/7 (2.5 overs)
		252 (75.3 overs) (f/o); Nihal Mansoor 67 (116); Zia-ul-Haq 5/66 (20 overs)

Sui Southern Gas Company won by an innings and 46 runs
Marghzar Cricket Ground, Islamabad
Umpires: Asif Yaqoob and Shameem Ansari

- Pakistan Television won the toss and elected to field first.

3–6 October 2018
Scorecard

Zarai Taraqiati Bank Limited	v	Water and Power Development Authority
216 (46 overs); Saadullah Ghauri 88 (98); Mohammad Asif 5/56 (23 overs)		339 (86.5 overs); Mohammad Saad 89 (175); Mohammad Ali 6/102 (26 overs)
229 (49 overs); Saadullah Ghauri 58 (50); Ehsan Adil 3/44 (11 overs)		107/1 (28.5 overs); Rafatullah Mohmand 64* (90); Imran Khan 1/13 (5 overs)

Water and Power Development Authority won by 9 wickets
Pindi Club Ground, Rawalpindi
Umpires: Aslam Bareach and Waleed Yaqub

- Water and Power Development Authority won the toss and elected to field.

3–6 October 2018
Scorecard

Karachi Whites	v	Rawalpindi
491 (118.4 overs); Khurram Manzoor 197 (218); Haseeb Azam 4/71 (17 overs)		369 (119.4 overs); Mohammad Nawaz 143 (200); Waqar Anwar 5/60 (31.4 overs)
110 (63.4 overs); Shehzar Mohammad 24 (40); Haseeb Azam 6/29 (24 overs)		106/4 (31 overs); Umar Waheed 39* (68); Mohammad Sami 2/15 (7 overs)

Match drawn
National Stadium, Karachi
Umpires: Qaiser Waheed and Farooq Ali Khan

- Rawalpindi won the toss and elected to field.

3–6 October 2018
Scorecard

Lahore Blues	v	Multan
265 (114 overs); Rizwan Hussain 97 (156); Ali Usman 4/58 (32 overs)		149 (59.2 overs); Waqar Hussain 30 (49); Mohammad Rameez 4/43 (21 overs)
146 (43 overs); Fahad-ul-Haq 39 (48); Ahsan Baig 3/26 (9 overs)		241 (92.2 overs); Usman Liaqat 86 (231); Aizaz Cheema 5/53 (21 overs)

Lahore Blues won by 21 runs
Multan Cricket Stadium, Multan
Umpires: Waseemuddin and Riazuddin

- Lahore Blues won the toss and elected to bat.

==== Round 6 ====
11–14 October 2018
Scorecard

Lahore Blues	v	Rawalpindi
334 (105.3 overs); Rizwan Hussain 94 (149); Haseeb Azam 4/61 (28.2 overs)		136 (37.3 overs); Mohammad Nawaz 78 (80); Aizaz Cheema 5/53 (17 overs)
21/1 (4.5 overs); Rizwan Hussain 17* (14); Umar Waheed 1/12 (2.5 overs)		218 (69.2 overs) (f/o); Tayyab Riaz 66 (97); Shahid Nawaz 5/60 (18.2 overs)

Lahore Blues won by 9 wickets
Gaddafi Stadium, Lahore
Umpires: Sultan Mahmood and Khalid Mahmood

- Rawalpindi won the toss and elected to field.

11–14 October 2018
Scorecard

Pakistan Television	v	Zarai Taraqiati Bank Limited
158 (55.3 overs); Mohammad Irfan 35 (82); Imran Khan 4/54 (14.3 overs)		318 (120.1 overs); Raza Ali Dar 73 (215); Tabish Khan 7/86 (41.1 overs)
241 (76.5 overs); Taimur Khan 62 (112); Naseem Shah 6/59 (20 overs)		84/1 (22.4 overs); Anas Mustafa 31* (64); Tabish Khan 1/43 (11.4 overs)

Zarai Taraqiati Bank Limited won by 9 wickets
Rawalpindi Cricket Stadium, Rawalpindi
Umpires: Aslam Bareach and Riazuddin

- Zarai Taraqiati Bank Limited won the toss and elected to field.

11–14 October 2018
Scorecard

Water and Power Development Authority	v	Sui Southern Gas Company
182 (60.5 overs); Sadaif Mehdi 43 (41); Kashif Bhatti 5/68 (20.5 overs)		528/9 (161 overs); Adil Amin 123 (256); Ehsan Adil 3/67 (21 overs)

Match drawn
Marghzar Cricket Ground, Islamabad
Umpires: Imtiaz Iqbal and Adnan Rashid

- Sui Southern Gas Corporation won the toss and elected to field.
- 6.1 overs of play took place on day 1 before the match was stopped due to a dangerous pitch and reduced to a three-day game.

11–14 October 2018
Scorecard

Karachi Whites	v	Multan
600/6d (161.1 overs); Shehzar Mohammad 265 (464); Ghulam Rehman 2/150 (31 overs)		260 (107 overs); Yousuf Babar 77 (191); Mohammad Sami 2/32 (20 overs)
73/5d (29 overs); Saad Ali 41 (88); Ali Usman 2/9 (7 overs)		235/6 (49 overs); Imran Rafiq 129* (135); Anwar Ali 3/74 (15 overs)

Match drawn
Multan Cricket Stadium, Multan
Umpires: Waseemuddin and Waleed Yaqub

- Karachi Whites won the toss and elected to bat.
- Yousuf Babar and Ghulam Rehman (Multan) both made their first-class debuts.

==== Round 7 ====
19–22 October 2018
Scorecard

Lahore Blues	v	Karachi Whites
128 (39 overs); Saad Nasim 31 (18); Waqar Anwar 3/35 (9 overs)		111 (23.4 overs); Mohammad Hasan 32 (30); Aizaz Cheema 6/40 (10 overs)
267 (79 overs); Irfan Haider 74 (164); Abdullah Mukaddam 5/70 (18 overs)		112 (37.3 overs); Saad Ali 30* (64); Shahid Nawaz 6/32 (11.3 overs)

Lahore Blues won by 172 runs
Lahore City Cricket Association Ground, Lahore
Umpires: Majid Hussain and Waseemuddin

- Karachi Whites won the toss and elected to field.
- Tauseeq Ahmed (Karachi Whites) made his first-class debut.

19–22 October 2018
Scorecard

Multan	v	Rawalpindi
212 (57.1 overs); Zeeshan Ashraf 101 (123); Tauseeq Shah 5/75 (26 overs)		178 (50.5 overs); Zeeshan Malik 39 (79); Sajjad Hussain 5/58 (18.5 overs)
148 (52.2 overs); Imran Rafiq 43 (105); Haseeb Azam 5/49 (15 overs)		183/5 (45.2 overs); Naved Malik 46 (65); Saddam Afridi 2/54 (14 overs)

Rawalpindi won by 5 wickets
Rawalpindi Cricket Stadium, Rawalpindi
Umpires: Aslam Bareach and Adnan Rashid

- Rawalpindi won the toss and elected to field.

19–22 October 2018
Scorecard

Water and Power Development Authority	v	Pakistan Television
289 (65.4 overs); Bismillah Khan 75 (113); Azharullah 5/96 (27.4 overs)		245 (76.3 overs); Mohammad Irfan 73 (106); Waqar Malik 4/62 (14.4 overs)
180 (43.5 overs); Kamran Akmal 71 (86); Azharullah 5/79 (18 overs)		227/7 (57.2 overs); Hasan Mohsin 53 (71); Ehsan Adil 4/45 (15 overs)

Pakistan Television won by 3 wickets
Marghzar Cricket Ground, Islamabad
Umpires: Farooq Ali Khan and Riazuddin

- Pakistan Television won the toss and elected to field.
- Arshad Iqbal (Water and Power Development Authority) made his first-class debut.

19–22 October 2018
Scorecard

Zarai Taraqiati Bank Limited	v	Sui Southern Gas Company
269 (98.3 overs); Anas Mustafa 75 (112); Azhar Attari 3/41 (22 overs)		510/8d (126 overs); Adil Amin 211* (345); Haseeb-ur-Rehman 6/101 (29 overs)
154 (50.3 overs); Raza Ali Dar 58 (120); Mohammad Amir 5/55 (16.3 overs)

Sui Southern Gas Company won by an innings and 87 runs
Diamond Club Ground, Islamabad
Umpires: Khalid Mahmood and Tahir Rasheed

- Zarai Taraqiati Bank Limited won the toss and elected to bat.

== Super Eight ==
Group 1

Team	Pld	W	L	D	Pts
Sui Northern Gas Pipelines	3	2	0	1	19
Water and Power Development Authority	3	2	1	0	19
Khan Research Laboratories	3	1	1	1	12
Lahore Blues	3	0	3	0	0

Team qualified for the Final

Group 2

Team	Pld	W	L	D	Pts
Habib Bank Limited	3	2	0	1	21
Sui Southern Gas Corporation	3	2	0	1	19
Peshawar	3	1	2	0	6
Karachi Whites	3	0	3	0	0

Team qualified for the Final

=== Group 1 ===
7–10 November 2018
Scorecard

Khan Research Laboratories	v	Lahore Blues
207 (93.4 overs); Junaid Ali 49 (125); Zafar Gohar 5/74 (34.4 overs)		203 (76.5 overs); Irfan Haider 96* (190); Nayyer Abbas 4/52 (18 overs)
304/9d (98 overs); Jaahid Ali 124* (269); Aizaz Cheema 2/41 (16 overs)		167 (55.4 overs); Saad Nasim 67* (105); Nauman Ali 6/56 (24.4 overs)

Khan Research Laboratories won by 141 runs
National Bank of Pakistan Sports Complex, Karachi
Umpires: Imran Javed and Riazuddin

- Khan Research Laboratories won the toss and elected to bat.

7–10 November 2018
Scorecard

Sui Northern Gas Pipelines Limited	v	Water and Power Development Authority
371 (140.1 overs); Hussain Talat 76 (149); Mohammad Asif 4/65 (26 overs)		160 (40.5 overs); Kamran Akmal 50 (73); Mohammad Abbas 6/42 (15.5 overs)
187/3d (40.5 overs); Azhar Ali 72 (122); Zulfiqar Babar 2/67 (12.5 overs)		322 (108.2 overs); Kamran Akmal 98 (147); Mohammad Abbas 6/52 (30.2 overs)

Sui Northern Gas Pipelines Limited won by 76 runs
State Bank of Pakistan Sports Complex, Karachi
Umpires: Khalid Mahmood and Tahir Rasheed

- Water and Power Development Authority won the toss and elected to field.
- Muhammad Musa (Sui Northern Gas Pipelines Limited) made his first-class debut.

13–16 November 2018
Scorecard

Lahore Blues	v	Sui Northern Gas Pipelines Limited
122 (35 overs); Jahangir Mirza 38 (61); Imran Khalid 4/28 (13 overs)		258 (92.1 overs); Iftikhar Ahmed 125 (226); Zafar Gohar 4/93 (41.1 overs)
108 (34.3 overs); Hasan Qadeer 38 (58); Imran Khalid 5/25 (11.3 overs)

Sui Northern Gas Pipelines Limited won by an innings and 28 runs
National Bank of Pakistan Sports Complex, Karachi
Umpires: Mohammad Sajid and Tahir Rasheed

- Lahore Blues won the toss and elected to bat.
- Hasan Qadeer, Ahmed Akram and Zia Shahzad (Lahore Blues) all made their first-class debuts.

13–16 November 2018
Scorecard

Khan Research Laboratories	v	Water and Power Development Authority
110 (44.4 overs); Nayyer Abbas 42 (106); Zahid Mansoor 4/37 (14.4 overs)		296 (112.5 overs); Abubakar Khan 67 (200); Sadaf Hussain 3/75 (26 overs)
162 (83.1 overs); Usman Arshad 64 (114); Zahid Mansoor 4/17 (13.1 overs)

Water and Power Development Authority won by an innings and 24 runs
State Bank of Pakistan Sports Complex, Karachi
Umpires: Aaley Haider and Waleed Yaqub

- Khan Research Laboratories won the toss and elected to bat.

19–22 November 2018
Scorecard

Khan Research Laboratories	v	Sui Northern Gas Pipelines Limited
272 (70.5 overs); Saif Badar 118 (139); Muhammad Musa 3/66 (16.5 overs)		191 (79.4 overs); Ali Waqas 43 (142); Nauman Ali 4/36 (26 overs)
278/5d (107 overs); Azeem Ghumman 142* (335); Samiullah Khan 2/34 (15 overs)		129/7 (82 overs); Ali Waqas 32 (116); Nauman Ali 3/14 (32 overs)

Match drawn
State Bank of Pakistan Sports Complex, Karachi
Umpires: Aaley Haider and Khalid Mahmood

- Sui Northern Gas Pipelines Limited won the toss and elected to field.
- Shayan Sheikh (Khan Research Laboratories) made his first-class debut.

19–22 November 2018
Scorecard

Lahore Blues	v	Water and Power Development Authority
193 (78.1 overs); Ahmed Akram 57 (155); Zulfiqar Babar 6/58 (30.1 overs)		210 (76 overs); Muhammad Akhlaq 81 (173); Aizaz Cheema 4/38 (12 overs)
246 (111 overs); Zafar Gohar 57 (152); Zulfiqar Babar 5/83 (40 overs)		231/5 (64.5 overs); Salman Butt 85* (97); Aizaz Cheema 2/23 (15 overs)

Water and Power Development Authority won by 5 wickets
National Bank of Pakistan Sports Complex, Karachi
Umpires: Riazuddin and Shameem Ansari

- Lahore Blues won the toss and elected to bat.

=== Group 2 ===
7–10 November 2018
Scorecard

Sui Southern Gas Company	v	Peshawar
376 (100.4 overs); Umar Amin 172 (237); Mohammad Ilyas 4/69 (21 overs)		303 (103.2 overs); Gauhar Ali 86 (154); Mohammad Irfan 4/71 (25 overs)
178 (54.2 overs); Umar Amin 46 (66); Mohammad Ilyas 5/44 (15.2 overs)		143 (50.5 overs); Mohammad Mohsin 33 (64); Umer Khan 6/37 (15 overs)

Sui Southern Gas Company won by 108 runs
Southend Club Cricket Stadium, Karachi
Umpires: Shameem Ansari and Imtiaz Iqbal

- Peshawar won the toss and elected to field.
- Umer Khan (Sui Southern Gas Company) made his first-class debut.

7–10 November 2018
Scorecard

Karachi Whites	v	Habib Bank Limited
154 (54.4 overs); Asad Baig 42 (89); Abdur Rehman 8/70 (20.4 overs)		217 (68 overs); Imran Farhat 67 (126); Waleed Ahmed 5/53 (17 overs)
107 (26.4 overs); Mohammad Sami 32 (27); Abdur Rehman 6/50 (11 overs)		47/1 (13.3 overs); Saad Khan 25* (40); Waleed Ahmed 1/20 (6.3 overs)

Habib Bank Limited won by 9 wickets
United Bank Limited Sports Complex, Karachi
Umpires: Ahmed Shahab and Waleed Yaqub

- Karachi Whites won the toss and elected to bat.

13–16 November 2018
Scorecard

Peshawar	v	Karachi Whites
311 (98.3 overs); Akbar Badshah 84 (183); Mohammad Sami 4/75 (25.3 overs)		338 (106.3 overs); Anwar Ali 81* (98); Sajid Khan 3/70 (21 overs)
276 (84.1 overs); Nabi Gul 62 (113); Waleed Ahmed 6/85 (34 overs)		168 (59 overs); Mohammad Hasan 63 (78); Zahid Mahmood 3/54 (15 overs)

Peshawar won by 81 runs
Southend Club Cricket Stadium, Karachi
Umpires: Zameer Haider and Faisal Afridi

- Karachi Whites won the toss and elected to field.
- Akmal Khan (Peshawar) made his first-class debut.

13–16 November 2018
Scorecard

Sui Southern Gas Company	v	Habib Bank Limited
211 (54.2 overs); Aamer Yamin 48 (75); Khurram Shehzad 5/57 (14 overs)		274 (85.1 overs); Zohaib Khan 65 (121); Mohammad Amir 5/44 (20 overs)
380/5d (97 overs); Fawad Alam 85* (138); Umar Gul 2/68 (20 overs)		199/6 (88.4 overs); Imran Farhat 77 (165); Mohammad Amir 2/34 (16 overs)

Match drawn
United Bank Limited Sports Complex, Karachi
Umpires: Ahmed Shahab and Imtiaz Iqbal

- Sui Southern Gas Corporation won the toss and elected to bat.

19–22 November 2018
Scorecard

Karachi Whites	v	Sui Southern Gas Company
158 (69.4 overs); Omair Yousuf 92* (222); Kashif Bhatti 4/48 (24 overs)		432/8d (117 overs); Fawad Alam 170* (258); Adeel Malik 3/75 (28 overs)
149 (39.1 overs); Mohammad Hasan 83 (84); Kashif Bhatti 4/25 (10.1 overs)

Sui Southern Gas Company won by an innings and 125 runs
Southend Club Cricket Stadium, Karachi
Umpires: Ahmed Shahab and Faisal Afridi

- Sui Southern Gas Corporation won the toss and elected to field.

19–22 November 2018
Scorecard

Peshawar	v	Habib Bank Limited
237 (66.5 overs); Mehran Ibrahim 107* (157); Umar Gul 4/93 (20 overs)		243 (77.2 overs); Amad Butt 48 (90); Mohammad Ilyas 4/61 (21 overs)
116 (39.1 overs); Akbar Badshah 49 (73); Zohaib Khan 4/26 (9.1 overs)		114/1 (20.5 overs); Mohammad Waqas 54* (64); Israrullah 1/26 (4 overs)

Habib Bank Limited won by 9 wickets
United Bank Limited Sports Complex, Karachi
Umpires: Imran Javed and Zameer Haider

- Habib Bank Limited won the toss and elected to field.

== Final ==
4–8 December 2018
Scorecard

Sui Northern Gas Pipelines	v	Habib Bank Limited
304 (110.2 overs); Misbah-ul-Haq 91 (184); Abdur Rehman 4/90 (40.2 overs)		472 (160.5 overs); Abid Ali 134 (315); Khurram Shehzad 2/14 (7 overs)
430/7d (78.3 overs); Imran Butt 95 (125); Abdur Rehman 4/156 (35 overs)		183/6 (78.2 overs); Umar Akmal 52 (85); Bilawal Bhatti 3/46 (15 overs)

Match drawn
(Habib Bank Limited won on 1st innings lead)
United Bank Limited Sports Complex, Karachi
Umpires: Faisal Afridi and Mohammad Asif
Player of the match: Umar Akmal (Habib Bank Limited)

- Sui Northern Gas Pipelines Limited won the toss and elected to bat.
