= List of Southern Punjab (Pakistan) squads =

Southern Punjab cricket team is a − first-class cricket team in Pakistan. The team with five other new teams was introduced as a part of new domestic structure by − Pakistan Cricket Board (PCB) on 31 August 2019.

== 2019 squads ==
On 3 September 2019, PCB confirmed team's First XI and Second XI squads for the 2019–21 season. Pakistan's Test opener Shan Masood was announced as captain of the team's First XI, while Naved Yasin was named as Second XI's captain for the season.

=== First XI ===
1. Shan Masood (c)
2. Sami Aslam (vc)
3. Mohammad Abbas
4. Abdul Rehman Muzammil
5. Adnan Akmal (wk)
6. Aamer Yamin
7. Bilawal Bhatti
8. Imran Rafiq
9. Mohammad Irfan
10. Mohammad Irfan
11. Mohammad Hafeez
12. Rahat Ali
13. Saif Badar
14. Sohaib Maqsood
15. Umaid Asif
16. Umar Siddiq
17. Zahid Mahmood
18. Zain Abbas
19. Ali Khan
20. Shoaib Malik
21. Sadaif Mehdi

=== Second XI ===
1. Naved Yasin (c)
2. Salman Ali Agha (vc)
3. Ali Usman
4. Anas Mustafa
5. Ataullah
6. Maqbool Ahmed (wk)
7. Mohammad Ali Khan
8. Mohammad Basit
9. Mohammad Imran
10. Mohammad Irfan Jr
11. Mohammad Mohsin
12. Mohammad Umair
13. Mukhtar Ahmed
14. Zeeshan Ashraf
15. Zia-ul-Haq
16. Zulfiqar Babar (mentor)

== 2020 squads ==
1. Shan Masood (c)
2. Hussain Talat (vc)
3. Aamer Yamin
4. Ali Shafiq
5. Bilawal Bhatti
6. Khushdil Shah
7. Mohammad Abbas
8. Mohammad Ilyas
9. Mohammad Irfan
10. Rahat Ali
11. Saif Badar
12. Sohaib Maqsood
13. Umer Khan
14. Umar Siddiq
15. Zahid Mahmood
16. Zeeshan Ashraf (wk)
