= List of Zarai Taraqiati Bank Limited cricketers =

List of cricketers

This is a list of cricketers who have played first-class, List A or Twenty20 matches for Zarai Taraqiati Bank Limited cricket team. The team played 119 first-class matches between 2002 and 2018, 71 List A matches between 2003 and 2018, and 10 Twenty20 matches in 2013.

== Players ==
- Mohammad Aamer
- Aun Abbas
- Imran Abbas
- Riaz Afridi
- Tanvir Ahmed
- Saeed Ajmal
- Adnan Akmal
- Abid Ali
- Haider Ali
- Mansoor Ali
- Mohammad Ali
- Shahrukh Ali
- Yasir Ali
- Mansoor Amjad
- Iftikhar Anjum
- Shakeel Ansar
- Bilal Asad
- Naved Ashraf
- Usman Ashraf
- Faisal Athar
- Babar Azam
- Sabih Azhar
- Azizullah
- Aamer Bashir
- Kashif Daud
- Zahoor Elahi
- Saadullah Ghauri
- Zulqarnain Haider
- Jawad Hameed
- Raza Hasan
- Javed Hayat
- Inam-ul-Haq
- Saad Janjua
- Aqib Javed
- Mohammad Khalil
- Alamgir Khan
- Imran Khan
- Sharjeel Khan
- Anas Mustafa
- Ali Nasir
- Imran Nazir
- Usman Qadir
- Afaq Raheem
- Mansoor Rana
- Abdul Razzaq
- Haseeb-ur-Rehman
- Salahuddin
- Aqib Shah
- Naseem Shah
- Usman Shinwari
- Haris Sohail
- Hussain Talat
- Sohail Tanvir
- Mohammad Umair
- Wajahatullah Wasti
- Yasir Hameed
- Mohammad Yousuf
- Shahid Yousuf
- Junaid Zia
