= 2020 Multan Sultans season =

Franchise cricket team in Pakistan Super League

Multan Sultans
2020 season
- Coach: Andy Flower
- Captain: Shan Masood
- Regular season: 1st
- PSL Finals: Eliminator (3rd)

The Multan Sultans is a franchise cricket team that represents Multan, Punjab, Pakistan in the Pakistan Super League. The team was founded in 2017 and made its PSL debut in the 2018 season. They were one of the sixth team that competed in 2020 Pakistan Super League. The team was coached by Andy Flower, and captained by Shan Masood.

== Squad ==
- Players with international caps are shown in **bold**
- Ages are given as of the first match of the season, 20 February 2020

No.	Name	Nationality	Birth date	Batting style	Bowling style	Year signed	Notes
Batsmen
2	**Rilee Rossouw**	South Africa	9 October 1989 (aged 30)	Left-handed	Right-arm off break	2020	Overseas
14	**James Vince**	England	14 March 1991 (aged 28)	Right-handed	Right-arm medium	2019	Overseas
94	**Shan Masood**	Pakistan	14 October 1989 (aged 30)	Right-handed	Left-arm medium-fast	2018	Captain
72	**Khushdil Shah**	Pakistan	7 February 1995 (aged 25)	Left-handed	Left-arm orthodox	2020	
77	Wayne Madsen	England	2 January 1984 (aged 36)	Right-handed	Right-arm off break	2020	Overseas. Replacement for Fabian Allen
81	**Asad Shafiq**	Pakistan	28 January 1986 (aged 34)	Right-handed	Right-arm off break	2020	
All-rounders
10	**Shahid Afridi**	Pakistan	1 February 1980 (aged 40)	Right-handed	Right-arm leg break	2019	
18	**Moeen Ali**	England	18 June 1987 (aged 32)	Left-handed	Right-arm off break	2020	Overseas
25	**Ravi Bopara**	England	4 May 1985 (aged 34)	Right-handed	Right-arm medium	2020	Overseas
33	**Sohail Tanvir**	Pakistan	12 December 1984 (aged 35)	Left-handed	Left-arm fast-medium	2020	
80	**Bilawal Bhatti**	Pakistan	17 September 1991 (aged 28)	Right-handed	Right-arm fast-medium	2020	
97	**Fabian Allen**	West Indies	7 May 1995 (aged 24)	Right-handed	Slow left-arm orthodox	2020	Overseas. Partially unavailable
Wicket-keepers
6	Rohail Nazir	Pakistan	10 October 2001 (aged 18)	Right-handed	—	2020	Vice-captain
60	Zeeshan Ashraf	Pakistan	11 May 1992 (aged 27)	Left-handed	Right-arm off break	2018	
Bowlers
3	Ali Shafiq	Pakistan	16 November 1996 (aged 23)	Right-handed	Right-arm medium-fast	2019	
12	**Junaid Khan**	Pakistan	24 December 1989 (aged 30)	Right-handed	Left-arm fast	2018	
27	**Mohammad Irfan**	Pakistan	6 June 1982 (aged 37)	Right-handed	Left-arm fast	2018	
37	Mohammad Ilyas	Pakistan	21 March 1999 (aged 20)	Right-handed	Right-arm fast-medium	2019	
91	Usman Qadir	Pakistan	10 August 1993 (aged 26)	Right-handed	Right-arm leg break	2020	
99	**Imran Tahir**	South Africa	27 March 1979 (aged 40)	Right-handed	Right-arm leg break	2020	Overseas

== Kit manufacturers and sponsors ==
Shirt sponsor (chest)	Shirt sponsor (back)	Chest branding	Sleeve branding
Pepsi	Fatima Group	Kurkure	Pepsi, Asia Ghee, Shell V-Power

Playing kit

== Points table ==
Pos	Team	Pld	W	L	NR	Pts	NRR
1	Multan Sultans (3rd)	10	6	2	2	14	1.031
2	Karachi Kings (C)	10	5	4	1	11	−0.190
3	Lahore Qalandars (R)	10	5	5	0	10	−0.072
4	Peshawar Zalmi (4th)	10	4	5	1	9	−0.055
5	Quetta Gladiators	10	4	5	1	9	−0.722
6	Islamabad United	10	3	6	1	7	0.185

Source: ESPNcricinfo
- The top four teams qualified for the playoffs
- Advanced to Qualifier
- Advanced to Eliminator 1

== League fixtures and results ==
21 February 2020
20:00 (D/N)
Scorecard

(H) Lahore Qalandars; 138/8 (20 overs)	v	Multan Sultans; 142/5 (16.1 overs)
Chris Lynn 39 (19); Moeen Ali 2/13 (2 overs)		Shan Masood 38 (29); David Wiese 1/11 (2 overs)

Multan Sultans won by 5 wickets
Gaddafi Stadium, Lahore
Umpires: Ranmore Martinesz (SL) and Rashid Riaz (Pak)
Player of the match: Imran Tahir (Multan Sultans)

- Multan Sultans won the toss and elected to field.

22 February 2020
19:00 (D/N)
Scorecard

Multan Sultans; 164/8 (20 overs)	v	Islamabad United; 165/2 (16.4 overs)
Zeeshan Ashraf 50 (29); Amad Butt 4/27 (4 overs)		Luke Ronchi 74 (45); Mohammad Ilyas 1/17 (2.4 overs)

Islamabad United won by 8 wickets
Gaddafi Stadium, Lahore
Umpires: Ranmore Martinesz (SL) and Shozab Raza (Pak)
Player of the match: Luke Ronchi (Islamabad United)

- Islamabad United won the toss and elected to field.

26 February 2020
19:00 (D/N)
Scorecard

Peshawar Zalmi; 123 (18.3 overs)	v	Multan Sultans (H); 124/4 (14.5 overs)
Haider Ali 47 (27); Sohail Tanvir 4/13 (3.3 overs)		Rilee Rossouw 49* (42); Wahab Riaz 2/36 (3.5 overs)

Multan Sultans won by 6 wickets
Multan Cricket Stadium, Multan
Umpires: Faisal Afridi (Pak) and Asif Yaqoob (Pak)
Player of the match: Sohail Tanvir (Multan Sultans)

- Multan Sultans won the toss and elected to field.

28 February 2020
15:00
Scorecard

(H) Multan Sultans; 186/6 (20 overs)	v	Karachi Kings; 134 (17 overs)
Moeen Ali 65 (42); Mohammad Amir 2/27 (4 overs)		Alex Hales 29 (21); Imran Tahir 3/28 (3 overs)

Multan Sultans won by 52 runs
Multan Cricket Stadium, Multan
Umpires: Faisal Afridi (Pak) and Shozab Raza (Pak)
Player of the match: Moeen Ali (Multan Sultans)

- Karachi Kings won the toss and elected to field.

29 February 2020
14:00
Scorecard

(H) Multan Sultans; 199/5 (20 overs)	v	Quetta Gladiators; 169/7 (20 overs)
Rilee Rossouw 100* (44); Mohammad Nawaz 1/16 (3 overs)		Shane Watson 80 (41); Bilawal Bhatti 3/26 (4 overs)

Multan Sultans won by 30 runs
Multan Cricket Stadium, Multan
Umpires: Faisal Afridi (Pak) and Asif Yaqoob (Pak)
Player of the match: Rilee Rossouw (Multan Sultans)

- Multan Sultans won the toss and elected to bat.
- Rilee Rossouw (Multan Sultans) scored the fastest century in the PSL (43 balls).

6 March 2020
19:00 (D/N)
Scorecard

Multan Sultans; 102/6 (16.5 overs)	v	Karachi Kings
Shahid Afridi 35* (17); Imad Wasim 2/14 (4 overs)

No result
Gaddafi Stadium, Lahore
Umpires: Michael Gough (Eng) and Shozab Raza (Pak)

- Karachi Kings won the toss and elected to field.
- No further play was possible due to rain.

8 March 2020
14:00
Scorecard

(H) Islamabad United; 91/7 (9 overs)	v	Multan Sultans; 94/1 (6.4 overs)
Colin Munro 25 (12); Imran Tahir 2/13 (2 overs)		James Vince 61* (24); Shadab Khan 1/30 (2 overs)

Multan Sultans won by 9 wickets
Rawalpindi Cricket Stadium, Rawalpindi
Umpires: Ranmore Martinesz (SL) and Tariq Rasheed (Pak)
Player of the match: James Vince (Multan Sultans)

- Multan Sultans won the toss and elected to field.
- The match was reduced to 9 overs per side due to rain.
- Multan Sultans qualified for the play-offs.

11 March 2020
19:00 (D/N)
Scorecard

Quetta Gladiators	v	Multan Sultans

Match abandoned
Gaddafi Stadium, Lahore
Umpires: Aleem Dar (Pak) and Asif Yaqoob (Pak)

- No toss.
- No play was possible due to rain.

13 March 2020
20:00 (D/N)
Scorecard

Multan Sultans; 154/6 (20 overs)	v	Peshawar Zalmi; 151/7 (20 overs)
Zeeshan Ashraf 52 (39); Rahat Ali 3/24 (4 overs)		Imam-ul-Haq 56 (41); Sohail Tanvir 3/26 (4 overs)

Multan Sultans won by 3 runs
National Stadium, Karachi
Umpires: Michael Gough (Eng) and Rashid Riaz (Pak)
Player of the match: Zeeshan Ashraf (Multan Sultans)

- Peshawar Zalmi won the toss and elected to field.

15 March 2020
14:00
Scorecard

Multan Sultans; 186/6 (20 overs)	v	Lahore Qalandars (H); 191/1 (18.5 overs)
Khushdil Shah 70* (29); Shaheen Afridi 2/23 (4 overs)		Chris Lynn 113* (55); Usman Qadir 1/24 (4 overs)

Lahore Qalandars won by 9 wickets
Gaddafi Stadium, Lahore
Umpires: Aleem Dar (Pak) and Shozab Raza (Pak)
Player of the match: Chris Lynn (Lahore Qalandars)

- Lahore Qalandars won the toss and elected to field.
- Lahore Qalandars qualified for the ~~semi-finals~~ play-offs. (Note: Due to the COVID-19 pandemic, the matches were reduced from 34 to 33 and the playoffs were replaced by knockouts thus shortening the tournament. However, On 2 September 2020, PCB announced the schedule of the remaining fixtures, going back to the playoffs format.)

== Playoffs ==
=== Qualifier ===
14 November 2020
15:00
Scorecard

Multan Sultans; 141/7 (20 overs)	v	Karachi Kings; 141/8 (20 overs)
Ravi Bopara 40 (31); Arshad Iqbal 2/21 (4 overs)		Babar Azam 65 (53); Sohail Tanvir 3/25 (4 overs)

Match tied
(Karachi Kings won the Super Over)
National Stadium, Karachi
Umpires: Michael Gough (Eng) and Rashid Riaz (Pak)
Player of the match: Babar Azam (Karachi Kings)

- Karachi Kings won the toss and elected to field.
- Super Over: Karachi Kings 13/2 (1 over), Multan Sultans 9/0 (1 over)

=== Eliminator 2 ===
15 November 2020
20:00 (D/N)
Scorecard

Lahore Qalandars; 182/6 (20 overs)	v	Multan Sultans; 157 (19.1 overs)
David Wiese 48* (21); Shahid Afridi 2/18 (4 overs)		Adam Lyth 50 (29); David Wiese 3/27 (4 overs)

Lahore Qalandars won by 25 runs
National Stadium, Karachi
Umpires: Aleem Dar (Pak) and Michael Gough (Eng)
Player of the match: David Wiese (Lahore Qalandars)

- Multan Sultans won the toss and elected to field.
