= List of Pakistan Television cricketers =

This is a list of cricketers who have played matches for the Pakistan Television cricket team.

== Notable players ==
- Mohammad Abbas
- Zohaib Ahmed
- Mohammad Ali
- Usman Ashraf
- Hammadullah Khan
- Mohammad Hasnain
- Ali Imran
- Mohammad Irfan
- Aamer Jamal
- Azam Khan
- Tabish Khan
- Umair Khan
- Athar Mahmood
- Abdul Majid
- Waleed Malik
- Nihal Mansoor
- Adnan Mehmood
- Hasan Mohsin
- Hasan Raza
- Usman Saeed
- Saud Shakeel
- Mohammad Waqas
- Ali Khan
