= Waqar =

Name list

Waqar (وقار waqār) is a name used by Muslim men in South Asia. Derived from Arabic, it means "dignity" or "honor". People named Waqar include:

== Given name ==
- Waqar Ahmed (cricketer, born 1980) (born 1980), Pakistani cricketer
- Waqar Ali (born 1966), Pakistani musician
- Waqar Anwar (born 1989), Pakistani cricketer
- Waqar Azmi (born 1970), British civil servant
- Wakar Hasan (born 1948), Bangladeshi army major
- Waqar Hasan (1932–2020), Pakistani cricketer
- Waqar Hussain (born 1993), Pakistani cricketer
- Waqar Khan, journalist and Pashto poet
- Waqar Masood Khan (1950/51–2025), Pakistani civil servant
- Waqar Malik (born 1995), Pakistani cricketer
- Waqar Mehboob (born 1991), Pakistani squash player
- Waqar Mohammad (born 1968), Pakistani and English cricketer
- Waqar Salamkheil (born 2001), Afghan cricketer
- Waqar Ahmed Seth (1961–2020), Pakistani jurist and Chief Justice of Peshawar High Court
- Waqar Ahmad Shah (1943–2018), Indian politician
- Waqar Younis (born 1971), Pakistan cricketer
- Waqar-uz-Zaman (born 1966), Bangladeshi lieutenant general

== Middle name ==
- Chaudhry Waqar Ahmad Cheema, Pakistani politician
- Syed Waqar Jaffry (born 1980), Pakistani academic and researcher in the field of Computer Science

== Surname ==
- Faraz Waqar (born 1976), Pakistani filmmaker, writer and director
- Khurram Waqar (born 1975), Pakistani guitarist and producer
- Mahvash Waqar, Pakistani artist and a backup vocalist for the band Laal
- Naveen Waqar (born 1986), Pakistani television actress and former video and radio jockey

== See also ==
- Nawab Waqar-ul-Mulk Kamboh, real name Mushtaq Hussain Zuberi (1841–1917), Indian Muslim politician and one of the founders of All India Muslim League
- Waqarullah Ishaq (born 1999), Afghan cricketer
