= 2019–20 Quaid-e-Azam Trophy =

Cricket tournament

- Dates: 14 September – 31 December 2019
- Administrator: Pakistan Cricket Board
- Cricket format: First-class
- Tournament format(s): Group stage and Final
- Host: Pakistan
- Champions: Central Punjab (1st title)
- Participants: 6
- Matches: 31
- Player of the series: Zafar Gohar
- Most runs: Imran Butt (934)
- Most wickets: Nauman Ali (54)
- Official website: www.pcb.com.pk

The 2019–20 Quaid-e-Azam Trophy was a first-class domestic cricket competition that took place in Pakistan from 14 September to 31 December 2019. Habib Bank Limited were the defending champions. However, after the new domestic structure was announced by Pakistan Cricket Board (PCB), six newly formed regional teams played in the tournament.

During the opening round of fixtures, a concussion substitute was used for the first time in a domestic cricket match in Pakistan. In the match between Southern Punjab and Central Punjab, Mohammad Saad replaced Usman Salahuddin in Central Punjab's team on the second day of the match. On 31 October 2019, Ahmed Shehzad was fined 50% of his match fee following a drawn match between his side, Central Punjab, and Sindh after his team was found guilty of ball-tampering.

The final was originally scheduled to be played from 9 to 13 December. However, in November 2019, the dates were moved to 27 to 31 December 2019, after Sri Lanka Cricket (SLC) agreed to tour Pakistan in December to play two Test matches. Ahead of the penultimate round of matches, four teams were in contention to reach the final. Following the conclusion of the tenth and final round of group stage matches, Central Punjab and Northern had qualified for the final of the tournament. Central Punjab won the tournament, beating Northern by an innings and 16 runs in the final. Umar Akmal and Bilal Asif were named as the men of the match, for the batting and bowling respectively, and Zafar Gohar was named the player of the tournament.

== Background ==
The PCB were working on revamping the domestic structure. However, Pakistan's Prime Minister, and former international cricketer, Imran Khan, had rejected the proposals, with Khan insisting that department sides no longer take part. The PCB also considered splitting the tournament into two parts, to have a window for the domestic T20 competition and the draft for the 2020 Pakistan Super League.

On 31 August 2019, the PCB confirmed the new structure of the tournament, in which six newly formed regional teams played a total of thirty-one matches, each team playing ten matches. The teams that competed were Balochistan, Central Punjab, Khyber Pakhtunkhwa, Northern, Sindh and Southern Punjab. On 3 September 2019, the PCB confirmed all of the squads for the tournament.

The PCB also updated the playing conditions for the tournament, including removing the mandatory coin toss and the possibility of extending the final by an extra day, if needed. The visiting team's captain had the choice to bowl first if they wished. If not, then the coin toss took place as before. This practice had been used in England since the 2016 County Championship season. If the final ended in a draw, the winner would be declared on the basis of a first innings lead. However, if the first innings for both teams had not been completed, an extra day would have been used. In the event that both teams did not complete their first innings, they would both be declared the winners of the tournament.

== Teams and squads ==
Each team was drafted with three centrally contracted players, sixteen regular players and three white ball specialists.

Balochistan	Central Punjab	Khyber Pakhtunkhwa	Northern	Sindh	Southern Punjab
Haris Sohail (c); Imran Farhat (vc); Imam-ul-Haq; Yasir Shah; Abubakar Khan; Ali Shafiq; Amad Butt; Asif Zakir; Azeem Ghumman; Bismillah Khan; Hussain Talat; Imran Butt; Khurram Shehzad; Mohammad Asghar; Shahbaz Khan; Shahzaib Ahmed; Taimur Khan; Taj Wali; Umar Gul; Akif Javed; Ibtisam Sheikh; Mohammad Talha	Babar Azam (c); Ahmed Shehzad (vc); Azhar Ali; Hasan Ali; Ahmed Bashir; Ali Shan; Bilal Asif; Ehsan Adil; Fahim Ashraf; Kamran Akmal; Mohammad Saad; Naseem Shah; Rizwan Hussain; Saad Nasim; Salman Butt; Umar Akmal; Usman Salahuddin; Waqas Maqsood; Zafar Gohar; Nasir Nawaz; Nauman Anwar; Usman Qadir	Mohammad Rizwan (c); Sahibzada Farhan (vc); Fakhar Zaman; Usman Shinwari; Adil Amin; Ashfaq Ahmed; Iftikhar Ahmed; Imran Khan Sr; Irfan Khan; Israrullah; Junaid Khan; Kamran Ghulam; Mohammad Ilyas; Musaddiq Ahmed; Nabi Gul; Rehan Afridi; Sameen Gul; Umer Khan; Zohaib Khan; Imran Khan Jr; Mohammad Arif; Mohammad Mohsin	Imad Wasim (c); Umar Amin (vc); Shadab Khan; Shaheen Afridi; Afaq Raheem; Ali Asad; Ali Sarfraz; Asif Ali; Haider Ali; Hammad Azam; Haris Rauf; Mohammad Nawaz; Muhammad Musa; Nauman Ali; Rohail Nazir; Sadaf Hussain; Sohail Tanvir; Umar Waheed; Waqas Ahmed; Mohammad Amir; Sohail Akhtar; Zaid Alam	Sarfraz Ahmed (c); Asad Shafiq (vc); Abid Ali; Anwar Ali; Fawad Alam; Hasan Mohsin; Kashif Bhatti; Khurram Manzoor; Mir Hamza; Mohammad Hasan; Mohammad Hasnain; Omair Bin Yousuf; Rameez Aziz; Saad Ali; Saud Shakeel; Shehzar Mohammad; Sohail Khan; Tabish Khan; Waleed Ahmed; Abrar Ahmed; Ahsan Jamil; Shahnawaz Dahani	Shan Masood (c); Sami Aslam (vc); Mohammad Abbas; ~~Wahab Riaz~~; Abdul Rehman Muzammil; Adnan Akmal; Aamer Yamin; Bilawal Bhatti; Imran Rafiq; Mohammad Irfan; Mohammad Irfan; Mohammad Hafeez; Rahat Ali; Saif Badar; Sohaib Maqsood; Umaid Asif; Umar Siddiq; Zahid Mehmood; Zain Abbas; Ali Khan; Shoaib Malik; Sadaif Mehdi

In September 2019, Wahab Riaz took an indefinite break from red-ball cricket, therefore withdrawing himself from Southern Punjab's squad.

== Points table ==
Team	Pld	W	L	T	D	Pts	NRR
Central Punjab	10	3	1	0	6	133	+0.191
Northern	10	3	2	0	5	130	+0.376
Khyber Pakhtunkhwa	10	2	1	0	7	124	–0.058
Southern Punjab	10	1	0	0	9	112	+0.092
Sindh	10	0	2	0	8	90	–0.158
Balochistan	10	0	3	0	7	84	–0.441

== Fixtures ==
=== Round 1 ===
14–17 September 2019
Scorecard

Sindh	v	Balochistan
473/5d (169.5 overs); Abid Ali 249* (512); Yasir Shah 3/127 (47 overs)		355/9 (173 overs); Imam-ul-Haq 152 (352); Asad Shafiq 3/85 (37 overs)

Match drawn
United Bank Limited Sports Complex, Karachi
Umpires: Aaley Haider and Khalid Mahmood

- Toss uncontested, Balochistan elected to field.
- Points: Sindh 9, Balochistan 7.

14–17 September 2019
Scorecard

Southern Punjab	v	Central Punjab
467 (134 overs); Sami Aslam 243* (410); Waqas Maqsood 4/83 (27 overs)		473 (150.1 overs); Umar Akmal 89 (118); Mohammad Irfan 4/120 (42.1 overs)
107/1 (30 overs); Sami Aslam 50* (82); Zafar Gohar 1/22 (9 overs)

Match drawn
Gaddafi Stadium, Lahore
Umpires: Shozab Raza and Tariq Rasheed

- Southern Punjab won the toss and elected to bat.
- Points: Southern Punjab 11, Central Punjab 11.

14–17 September 2019
Scorecard

Khyber Pakhtunkhwa	v	Northern
526/9d (136.4 overs); Mohammad Rizwan 176 (257); Shadab Khan 4/151 (44 overs)		262 (90.3 overs); Haider Ali 99 (208); Zohaib Khan 3/21 (15 overs)
		433/6 (114 overs) (f/o); Asif Ali 114 (133); Zohaib Khan 2/80 (27 overs)

Match drawn
Abbottabad Cricket Stadium, Abbottabad
Umpires: Farooq Ali Khan and Zameer Haider

- Toss uncontested, Northern elected to field.
- Haider Ali (Northern) made his first-class debut.
- Points: Khyber Pakhtunkhwa 13, Northern 8.

=== Round 2 ===
21–24 September 2019
Scorecard

Balochistan	v	Southern Punjab
500/9d (130.5 overs); Azeem Ghumman 163 (336); Mohammad Irfan 5/131 (51 overs)		308 (94.4 overs); Imran Rafiq 110* (239); Mohammad Asghar 3/41 (13.4 overs)
42/0 (11 overs); Imran Butt 29* (32)		381 (95 overs) (f/o); Adnan Akmal 82 (113); Yasir Shah 5/104 (31 overs)

Match drawn
Bugti Stadium, Quetta
Umpires: Ahmed Shahab and Aslam Bareach

- Toss uncontested, Southern Punjab elected to field.
- Points: Balochistan 13, Southern Punjab 9.

21–24 September 2019
Scorecard

Sindh	v	Khyber Pakhtunkhwa
476/9d (148.5 overs); Omair Yousuf 174 (298); Adil Amin 5/81 (28 overs)		355/8d (136.1 overs); Ashfaq Ahmed 113 (257); Kashif Bhatti 4/108 (49.1 overs)
81/1 (30 overs); Saad Ali 40* (97); Imran Khan 1/10 (4 overs)

Match drawn
United Bank Limited Sports Complex, Karachi
Umpires: Aaley Haider and Khalid Mahmood

- Toss uncontested, Khyber Pakhtunkhwa elected to field.
- Points: Sindh 11, Khyber Pakhtunkhwa 10.

21–24 September 2019
Scorecard

Central Punjab	v	Northern
433 (107.5 overs); Kamran Akmal 157 (170); Nauman Ali 4/104 (29 overs)		114 (60.3 overs); Raza Hasan 20 (84); Zafar Gohar 4/36 (19 overs)
		219 (66.3 overs) (f/o); Hammad Azam 38 (52); Bilal Asif 4/57 (18.3 overs)

Central Punjab won by an innings and 100 runs
Iqbal Stadium, Faisalabad
Umpires: Shozab Raza and Ghaffar Kazmi

- Toss uncontested, Northern elected to field.
- Points: Central Punjab 24, Northern 3.

=== Round 3 ===
28 September–1 October 2019
Scorecard

Central Punjab	v	Balochistan
521/6d (122.2 overs); Salman Butt 237 (376); Yasir Shah 3/163 (45 overs)		270 (85.2 overs); Bismillah Khan 71 (143); Naseem Shah 3/43 (17.2 overs)
		239 (69.5 overs) (f/o); Bismillah Khan 70 (106); Bilal Asif 4/33 (8.5 overs)

Central Punjab won by innings and 12 runs
Bugti Stadium, Quetta
Umpires: Ahmed Shahab and Aslam Bareach

- Balochistan won the toss and elected to field.
- Points: Central Punjab 24, Balochistan 3.

28 September–1 October 2019
Scorecard

Northern	v	Sindh
271 (102.3 overs); Rohail Nazir 67 (120); Kashif Bhatti 3/51 (25 overs)		257/4 (82 overs); Asad Shafiq 77* (143); Sohail Tanvir 1/24 (11 overs)

Match drawn
Khan Research Laboratories Ground, Rawalpindi
Umpires: Abdul Muqeet and Mohammad Asif

- Toss uncontested, Sindh elected to field.
- Haris Rauf (Northern) made his first-class debut.
- Points: Sindh 10, Northern 8.

28 September–1 October 2019
Scorecard

Khyber Pakhtunkhwa	v	Southern Punjab
295/4 (86 overs); Israrullah 89 (180); Mohammad Abbas 2/53 (21 overs)

Match drawn
Abbottabad Cricket Stadium, Abbottabad
Umpires: Tariq Rasheed and Nasir Hussain

- Khyber Pakhtunkhwa won the toss and elected to bat.
- Points: Khyber Pakhtunkhwa 7, Southern Punjab 6.

=== Round 4 ===
5–8 October 2019
Scorecard

Northern	v	Balochistan
450 (105.4 overs); Faizan Riaz 141 (207); Amad Butt 3/57 (13.4 overs)		301 (101.5 overs); Asif Zakir 61 (129); Nauman Ali 5/52 (24.5 overs)
149/3d (30 overs); Zeeshan Malik 68 (78); Khurram Shehzad 2/35 (7 overs)		183/7 (67 overs); Imran Butt 59 (179); Faizan Riaz 2/16 (4 overs)

Match drawn
Khan Research Laboratories Ground, Rawalpindi
Umpires: Qaiser Waheed and Mohammad Asif

- Northern won the toss and elected to bat.
- Points: Northern 13, Balochistan 11.

5–8 October 2019
Scorecard

Southern Punjab	v	Sindh
546 (140.2 overs); Aamer Yamin 142 (189); Fawad Alam 2/63 (18.2 overs)		284 (99.1 overs); Asad Shafiq 57 (121); Rahat Ali 4/66 (24 overs)
		133 (43 overs) (f/o); Omair Yousuf 37 (76); Bilawal Bhatti 4/23 (8 overs)

Southern Punjab won by an innings and 129 runs
United Bank Limited Sports Complex, Karachi
Umpires: Khalid Mahmood and Tahir Rasheed

- Sindh won the toss and elected to field.
- Points: Southern Punjab 24, Sindh 4.

5–8 October 2019
Scorecard

Khyber Pakhtunkhwa	v	Central Punjab
484/5d (133 overs); Ashfaq Ahmed 173 (323); Naseem Shah 2/85 (26 overs)		278 (78.1 overs); Kamran Akmal 136 (215); Sameen Gul 4/57 (18 overs)
112/3d (35 overs); Israrullah 26 (58); Ehsan Adil 2/36 (12 overs)		129/1 (50 overs); Salman Butt 63* (157); Imran Khan 1/19 (8 overs)

Match drawn
Abbottabad Cricket Stadium, Abbottabad
Umpires: Saqib Khan and Ahmed Shahab

- Toss uncontested, Central Punjab elected to field.
- Points: Khyber Pakhtunkhwa 12, Central Punjab 8.

=== Round 5 ===
28–31 October 2019
Scorecard

Balochistan	v	Khyber Pakhtunkhwa
553/8d (145.4 overs); Imran Butt 214 (387); Sajid Khan 3/126 (36.4 overs)		406 (103.3 overs); Adil Amin 109 (177); Mohammad Asghar 4/107 (27.3 overs)
158d (43 overs); Imran Butt 29 (38); Sajid Khan 5/36 (12 overs)		220/5 (45 overs); Israrullah 85 (85); Yasir Shah 2/62 (14 overs)

Match drawn
Bugti Stadium, Quetta
Umpires: Ghaffar Kazmi and Shameem Ansari

- Toss uncontested, Khyber Pakhtunkhwa elected to field.
- Akif Javed (Balochistan) made his first-class debut.
- Points: Balochistan 11, Khyber Pakhtunkhwa 11.

28–31 October 2019
Scorecard

Central Punjab	v	Sindh
313 (95.5 overs); Kamran Akmal 90 (99); Kashif Bhatti 3/99 (32.5 overs)		256 (74.4 overs); Fawad Alam 92 (164); Naseem Shah 6/78 (19 overs)
273/5d (65.5 overs); Salman Butt 137* (206); Tabish Khan 3/65 (15.5 overs)		158/8 (58 overs); Sarfaraz Ahmed 54 (62); Naseem Shah 3/33 (11 overs)

Match drawn
Iqbal Stadium, Faisalabad
Umpires: Zameer Haider and Mohammad Asif

- Toss uncontested, Sindh elected to field.
- Points: Central Punjab 11, Sindh 10.

28–31 October 2019
Scorecard

Northern	v	Southern Punjab
550/6d (124.2 overs); Zeeshan Malik 216 (266); Rahat Ali 3/97 (28 overs)		453 (113.5 overs); Sohaib Maqsood 111 (111); Nauman Ali 5/148 (35 overs)
212/4 (57 overs); Haider Ali 79 (133); Mohammad Irfan 3/70 (25 overs)

Match drawn
Jinnah Stadium, Sialkot
Umpires: Abdul Muqeet and Farooq Ali Khan

- Northern won the toss and elected to bat.
- Points: Northern 12, Southern Punjab 11.

=== Round 6 ===
4–7 November 2019
Scorecard

Southern Punjab	v	Balochistan
502 (129.3 overs); Sami Aslam 168 (292); Mohammad Asghar 5/130 (31.3 overs)		295 (79.3 overs); Hussain Talat 89 (167); Umaid Asif 5/57 (17.3 overs)
11/0 (2.3 overs); Sami Aslam 6* (10)		295 (89.4 overs) (f/o); Hussain Talat 136 (167); Rahat Ali 5/49 (24 overs)

Match drawn
Bugti Stadium, Quetta
Umpires: Ghaffar Kazmi and Aslam Bareach

- Toss uncontested, Balochistan elected to field.
- Points: Southern Punjab 13, Balochistan 8.

4–7 November 2019
Scorecard

Khyber Pakhtunkhwa	v	Sindh
288 (106 overs); Sahibzada Farhan 88 (164); Sohail Khan 4/24 (17 overs)		147/3 (35 overs); Omair Yousuf 56 (75); Junaid Khan 2/49 (8 overs)

Match drawn
Abbottabad Cricket Stadium, Abbottabad
Umpires: Majid Hussain and Farooq Ali Khan

- Toss uncontested, Sindh elected to field.
- No play was possible on days 3 and 4 due to rain.
- Points: Khyber Pakhtunkhwa 8, Sindh 8.

4–7 November 2019
Scorecard

Central Punjab	v	Northern
226 (69.1 overs); Ahmed Shehzad 55 (112); Nauman Ali 8/71 (20.1 overs)		191 (64.1 overs); Hammad Azam 52 (101); Zafar Gohar 4/54 (25.1 overs)
345/6d (66.3 overs); Rizwan Hussain 110 (123); Nauman Ali 3/160 (28 overs)		176 (56.3 overs); Zeeshan Malik 52 (58); Zafar Gohar 7/79 (28 overs)

Central Punjab won by 204 runs
Iqbal Stadium, Faisalabad
Umpires: Nasir Hussain and Rashid Riaz

- Central won the toss and elected to bat.
- Points: Central Punjab 20, Northern 3.

=== Round 7 ===
11–14 November 2019
Scorecard

Balochistan	v	Central Punjab
450 (124.1 overs); Imran Butt 137 (225); Aizaz Cheema 5/100 (31.1 overs)		324/9 (93.1 overs); Usman Salahuddin 94 (177); Mohammad Asghar 3/109 (33.1 overs)

Match drawn
Gaddafi Stadium, Lahore
Umpires: Qaiser Waheed and Zameer Haider

- Central Punjab won the toss and elected to field.
- Points: Balochistan 13, Central Punjab 10.

11–14 November 2019
Scorecard

Northern	v	Sindh
408 (93.2 overs); Faizan Riaz 211 (200); Sohail Khan 3/89 (16 overs)		326 (105.5 overs); Fawad Alam 107 (161); Nauman Ali 5/58 (23 overs)
242/4d (53 overs); Zeeshan Malik 96* (133); Mir Hamza 2/72 (16 overs)		199 (55.5 overs); Sohail Khan 54 (60); Nauman Ali 4/51 (16 overs)

Northern won by 145 runs
National Stadium, Karachi
Umpires: Shameem Ansari and Tahir Rasheed

- Northern won the toss and elected to bat.
- Salman Irshad (Northern) made his first-class debut.
- Points: Northern 24, Sindh 6.

11–14 November 2019
Scorecard

Southern Punjab	v	Khyber Pakhtunkhwa
338 (100.3 overs); Umar Siddiq 88 (201); Ahmed Jamal 6/93 (30.3 overs)		417/5d (113 overs); Ashfaq Ahmed 143 (254); Umaid Asif 3/142 (32.4 overs)
337/5 (81 overs); Sami Aslam 150* (254); Irfanullah Shah 3/33 (15 overs)

Match drawn
Abbottabad Cricket Stadium, Abbottabad
Umpires: Saqib Khan and Asif Yaqoob

- Points: Khyber Pakhtunkhwa 13, Southern Punjab 9.

=== Round 8 ===
18–21 November 2019
Scorecard

Khyber Pakhtunkhwa	v	Balochistan
385 (114.3 overs); Zohaib Khan 133 (232); Mohammad Asghar 6/121 (35.3 overs)		146 (51 overs); Bismillah Khan 35 (58); Junaid Khan 4/36 (15 overs)
		117 (36 overs) (f/o); Bismillah Khan 40 (48); Sajid Khan 4/45 (11 overs)

Khyber Pakhtunkhwa won by an innings and 122 runs
United Bank Limited Sports Complex, Karachi
Umpires: Saqib Khan and Farooq Ali Khan

- Khyber Pakhtunkhwa won the toss and elected to bat.
- Points: Khyber Pakhtunkhwa 23, Balochistan 2.

18–21 November 2019
Scorecard

Central Punjab	v	Sindh
246 (94.3 overs); Kamran Akmal 59 (70); Tabish Khan 5/85 (28 overs)		339 (100.4 overs); Khurram Manzoor 85 (118); Aizaz Cheema 5/81 (25.4 overs)
499/9 (125 overs); Kamran Akmal 166 (212); Mohammad Umar 2/87 (22 overs)

Match drawn
National Stadium, Karachi
Umpires: Imran Javed and Shameem Ansari

- Central Punjab won the toss and elected to bat.
- Aamir Ali (Sindh) made his first-class debut.
- Points: Sindh 11, Central Punjab 9.

18–21 November 2019
Scorecard

Northern	v	Southern Punjab
463/7d (109.4 overs); Hammad Azam 100* (154); Mohammad Irfan 5/158 (38.4 overs)		268 (81.5 overs); Umar Siddiq 60 (131); Shadab Khan 3/33 (10.5 overs)
		271/4 (74 overs) (f/o); Umar Siddiq 107 (151); Shadab Khan 2/70 (19 overs)

Match drawn
Khan Research Laboratories Ground, Rawalpindi
Umpires: Asif Yaqoob and Rashid Riaz

- Northern won the toss and elected to bat.
- Points: Northern 13, Southern Punjab 9.

=== Round 9 ===
25–28 November 2019
Scorecard

Balochistan	v	Northern
300 (90.2 overs); Imran Butt 124 (150); Sadaf Hussain 4/75 (20 overs)		342 (86.2 overs); Jamal Anwar 93 (120); Taj Wali 6/89 (20.2 overs)
233 (79.5 overs); Bismillah Khan 69 (101); Nauman Ali 5/75 (33.5 overs)		192/2 (32.2 overs); Ali Sarfraz 95* (87); Khurram Shehzad 1/42 (7 overs)

Northern won by 8 wickets
United Bank Limited Sports Complex, Karachi
Umpires: Imran Javed and Qaiser Waheed

- Toss uncontested, Northern elected to field.
- Points: Northern 22, Balochistan 6.

25–28 November 2019
Scorecard

Southern Punjab	v	Sindh
517/9d (133.3 overs); Zeeshan Ashraf 133 (209); Anwar Ali 5/75 (25 overs)		486 (132 overs); Fawad Alam 211 (309); Bilawal Bhatti 4/82 (21 overs)
236/5 (75.4 overs); Abdul Rehman Muzammil 103* (238); Anwar Ali 2/28 (13 overs)

Match drawn
National Stadium, Karachi
Umpires: Faisal Afridi and Imtiaz Iqbal

- Southern Punjab won the toss and elected to bat.
- Shahnawaz Dahani (Sindh) made his first-class debut.
- Points: Sindh 12, Southern Punjab 11.

25–28 November 2019
Scorecard

Khyber Pakhtunkhwa	v	Central Punjab
355 (123.3 overs); Sahibzada Farhan 96 (244); Zafar Gohar 4/143 (52 overs)		288 (84.1 overs); Mohammad Saad 49 (155); Khalid Usman 4/67 (27 overs)
197/7d (54 overs); Israrullah 40 (135); Zafar Gohar 4/82 (27 overs)		113 (59.5 overs); Umar Akmal 43 (89); Usman Shinwari 3/20 (6 overs)

Khyber Pakhtunkhwa won by 211 runs
National Bank of Pakistan Sports Complex, Karachi
Umpires: Abdul Muqeet and Shameem Ansari

- Khyber Pakhtunkhwa won the toss and elected to bat.
- Points: Khyber Pakhtunkhwa 22, Central Punjab 3.

=== Round 10 ===
2–5 December 2019
Scorecard

Balochistan	v	Sindh
471/9d (133.3 overs); Imran Farhat 137 (263); Mir Hamza 4/98 (29 overs)		515 (170.1 overs); Saud Shakeel 151 (275); Jalat Khan 3/96 (41 overs)
181/1 (26.2 overs); Imran Butt 101* (99); Saud Shakeel 1/47 (8 overs)

Match drawn
National Stadium, Karachi
Umpires: Majid Hussain and Faisal Afridi

- Toss uncontested, Sindh elected to field.
- Points: Balochistan 10, Sindh 9.

2–5 December 2019
Scorecard

Central Punjab	v	Southern Punjab
597/9d (170 overs); Abdullah Shafique 133 (209); Agha Salman 3/85 (38 overs)		392 (95.1 overs); Zeeshan Ashraf 141 (212); Bilal Asif 5/130 (36.1 overs)
309/1 (81 overs); Salman Butt 158* (256); Agha Salman 1/77 (24 overs)

Match drawn
State Bank of Pakistan Sports Complex, Karachi
Umpires: Aaley Haider and Rashid Riaz

- Central Punjab won the toss and elected to bat.
- Abdullah Shafique (Central Punjab) made his first-class debut.
- Points: Central Punjab 13, Southern Punjab 10.

2–5 December 2019
Scorecard

Northern	v	Khyber Pakhtunkhwa
411/8d (106.4 overs); Sarmad Bhatti 109 (201); Sajid Khan 4/121 (35 overs)		306 (100.2 overs); Rehan Afridi 95* (47); Waqas Ahmed 6/109 (30 overs)
139/6d (25.2 overs); Zeeshan Malik 52 (44); Sajid Khan 2/15 (5 overs)		205 (76.4 overs); Zohaib Khan 51* (122); Nauman Ali 4/72 (28 overs)

Northern won by 39 runs
United Bank Limited Sports Complex, Karachi
Umpires: Shozab Raza and Imtiaz Iqbal

- Toss uncontested, Khyber Pakhtunkhwa elected to field.
- Points: Northern 24, Khyber Pakhtunkhwa 5.

== Final ==
27–31 December 2019
Scorecard

Northern	v	Central Punjab
254 (61 overs); Faizan Riaz 116 (133); Faheem Ashraf 5/54 (14 overs)		675/8d (155.1 overs); Umar Akmal 218 (265); Faizan Riaz 2/62 (14.1 overs)
405 (111.3 overs); Haider Ali 134 (204); Bilal Asif 8/112 (31.3 overs)

Central Punjab won by an innings and 16 runs
National Stadium, Karachi
Umpires: Ahsan Raza and Asif Yaqoob
Player of the match: Umar Akmal and Bilal Asif (Central Punjab)

- Northern won the toss and elected to bat.
