= 2019 Pakistan Cup =

Cricket tournament

- Dates: 2 – 12 April 2019
- Administrator: Pakistan Cricket Board
- Cricket format: List A
- Tournament format(s): Round-robin and final
- Host: Rawalpindi
- Champions: Khyber Pakhtunkhwa (2nd title)
- Participants: 5
- Matches: 11
- Most runs: Umar Akmal (342)
- Most wickets: Wahab Riaz (10); Amad Butt (10)

The 2019 Pakistan Cup was the fourth edition of the Pakistan Cup, a List A cricket competition which was contested by five teams. It was held from 2 to 12 April 2019, with all the matches played at the Rawalpindi Cricket Stadium. The Pakistan Cricket Board (PCB) stated that the top performers in the tournament would be considered for the 2019 Cricket World Cup in England.

Federal Areas, the defending champions, were eliminated from the competition after losing their first three matches of the tournament. On 9 April 2019, Khyber Pakhtunkhwa beat Sindh by nine runs to advance to the final of the tournament. The result meant that Baluchistan also progressed to the final, regardless of the outcome of their last match against Federal Areas. Khyber Pakhtunkhwa won the tournament, and their second title, after beating Balochistan by nine runs in the final.

== Squads ==
Prior to the start of the tournament, the PCB named the following squads:

Baluchistan	Federal Areas	Khyber Pakhtunkhwa	Punjab	Sindh
Asad Shafiq (c); Ali Imran; Amad Butt; Awais Zia; Bismillah Khan (wk); Fawad Alam; Ghulam Mudassar; Haris Rauf; Mohammad Irfan; Qaiser Ashraf; Taj Wali; Umer Khan; Umar Akmal; Waqar Hussain (wk); Zeeshan Ashraf	Mohammad Rizwan (c, wk); Ahmed Shehzad; Asad Afridi; Bilal Asif; Israrullah; Khurram Shahzad; Mohammad Nawaz; Nihal Mansoor; Ramiz Raja; Rumman Raees; Sameen Gul; Saud Shakil; Sohaib Maqsood; Waqas Maqsood; Zia-ul-Haq	Salman Butt (c); Abid Ali; Adil Amin; Adnan Akmal (wk); Faizan Riaz; Khushdil Shah; Mohammad Irfan; Mohammad Irfan; Mohammad Saad; Sohail Khan; Muhammad Musa; Umaid Asif; Wahab Riaz; Zeeshan Malik; Zohaib Khan	Kamran Akmal (c, wk); Anwar Ali; Bilawal Bhatti; Ehsan Adil; Fahad Iqbal; Iftikhar Ahmed; Kashif Bhatti; Khurram Manzoor; Mohammad Asghar; Mohammad Sami; Ramiz Aziz; Saad Ali; Sami Aslam; Sohail Tanveer; Waleed Ahmed	Umer Gul (c); Ahsan Ali; Amir Yamin; Ashiq Ali; Asif Ali; Hammad Azam; Imran Rafiq; Mohammad Hasan (wk); Mohammad Hasnain; Mohammad Ilyas; Nauman Ali; Rahat Ali; Sahibzada Farhan; Umar Amin; Umar Siddique (wk)

== Group stage ==
=== Points table ===
Pos	Team	Pld	W	L	T	NR	Pts	NRR
1	Baluchistan	4	3	0	0	1	7	0.817
2	Khyber Pakhtunkhwa	4	3	0	0	1	7	0.267
3	Punjab	4	2	2	0	0	4	0.297
4	Sindh	4	1	3	0	0	2	−0.386
5	Federal Areas	4	0	4	0	0	0	−0.714

Teams qualified for the final

=== Fixtures ===
The fixtures were confirmed by the PCB:

2 April 2019
Scorecard

Punjab; 294 (49.4 overs)	v	Baluchistan; 296/4 (46 overs)
Saad Ali 73 (86); Haris Rauf 2/48 (10 overs)		Umar Akmal 136* (108); Iftikhar Ahmed 1/39 (10 overs)

Baluchistan won by 6 wickets
Rawalpindi Cricket Stadium, Rawalpindi
Umpires: Qaiser Waheed and Ghaffar Kazmi
Player of the match: Umar Akmal (Baluchistan)

- Punjab won the toss and elected to bat.
- Haris Rauf (Baluchistan) made his List A debut.

3 April 2019
Scorecard

Federal Areas; 269 (45.3 overs)	v	Khyber Pakhtunkhwa; 274/7 (49.4 overs)
Israrullah 77 (74); Wahab Riaz 5/52 (10 overs)		Adil Amin 70 (75); Sameen Gul 3/66 (9 overs)

Khyber Pakhtunkhwa won by 3 wickets
Rawalpindi Cricket Stadium, Rawalpindi
Umpires: Faisal Afridi and Imtiaz Iqbal
Player of the match: Wahab Riaz (Khyber Pakhtunkhwa)

- Federal Areas won the toss and elected to bat.

4 April 2019
Scorecard

Baluchistan; 346/9 (50 overs)	v	Sindh; 274 (44.2 overs)
Umar Akmal 99 (66); Hammad Azam 2/36 (7 overs)		Umar Siddiq 88 (64); Amad Butt 3/58 (10 overs)

Balochistan won by 72 runs
Rawalpindi Cricket Stadium, Rawalpindi
Umpires: Asif Yaqoob and Tahir Rasheed
Player of the match: Amad Butt (Balochistan)

- Sindh won the toss and elected to field.

5 April 2019
Scorecard

Punjab; 341/6 (50 overs)	v	Khyber Pakhtunkhwa; 343/6 (46.3 overs)
Iftikhar Ahmed 105 (101); Sohail Khan 3/55 (10 overs)		Khushdil Shah 154* (96); Sohail Tanvir 1/41 (9 overs)

Khyber Pakhtunkhwa won by 4 wickets
Rawalpindi Cricket Stadium, Rawalpindi
Umpires: Ahmed Shahab and Tahir Rasheed
Player of the match: Khushdil Shah (Khyber Pakhtunkhwa)

- Khyber Pakhtunkhwa won the toss and elected to field.

6 April 2019
Scorecard

Sindh; 385/4 (50 overs)	v	Federal Areas; 300 (43 overs)
Ahsan Ali 115 (102); Bilal Asif 2/81 (10 overs)		Rameez Raja 70 (62); Hammad Azam 4/57 (10 overs)

Sindh won by 85 runs
Rawalpindi Cricket Stadium, Rawalpindi
Umpires: Mohammad Asif and Waleed Yaqoob
Player of the match: Hammad Azam (Sindh)

- Sindh won the toss and elected to bat.

7 April 2019
Scorecard

Khyber Pakhtunkhwa; 358/6 (50 overs)	v	Baluchistan; 129/3 (17.5 overs)
Salman Butt 133 (132); Haris Rauf 2/70 (2 overs)		Awais Zia 84* (62); Umaid Asif 2/37 (4.5 overs)

No result
Rawalpindi Cricket Stadium, Rawalpindi
Umpires: Zameer Haider and Khalid Mahmood

- Balochistan won the toss and elected to field.
- Rain during Baluchistan's innings prevented any further play.

8 April 2019
Scorecard

Federal Areas; 321 (49.4 overs)	v	Punjab; 327/3 (46.4 overs)
Israrullah 96 (95); Waleed Ahmed 4/59 (10 overs)		Iftikhar Ahmed 109* (89); Khurram Shehzad 1/32 (7 overs)

Punjab won by 7 wickets
Rawalpindi Cricket Stadium, Rawalpindi
Umpires: Mohammad Sajid and Khalid Mahmood
Player of the match: Iftikhar Ahmed and Waleed Ahmed (Punjab)

- Punjab won the toss and elected to field.

9 April 2019
Scorecard

Khyber Pakhtunkhwa; 300 (50 overs)	v	Sindh; 291/9 (50 overs)
Khushdil Shah 100 (66); Hammad Azam 3/60 (10 overs)		Umar Siddiq 69 (65); Zohaib Khan 3/50 (9 overs)

Khyber Pakhtunkhwa won by 9 runs
Rawalpindi Cricket Stadium, Rawalpindi
Umpires: Mohammad Sajid and Tariq Rasheed
Player of the match: Khushdil Shah (Khyber Pakhtunkhwa)

- Sindh won the toss and elected to field.

10 April 2019
Scorecard

Baluchistan; 289 (49 overs)	v	Federal Areas; 266 (46.1 overs)
Umar Akmal 77 (45); Sadaf Hussain 4/46 (7 overs)		Mohammad Rizwan 76 (67); Amad Butt 3/45 (9.1 overs)

Balochistan won by 23 runs
Rawalpindi Cricket Stadium, Rawalpindi
Umpires: Ahsan Raza and Tariq Rasheed
Player of the match: Ali Imran (Baluchistan)

- Federal Areas won the toss and elected to field.

11 April 2019
Scorecard

Sindh; 295/9 (50 overs)	v	Punjab; 299/4 (38.2 overs)
Umar Amin 83 (85); Sohail Tanvir 3/17 (10 overs)		Khurram Manzoor 168 (116); Mohammad Ilyas 2/64 (9 overs)

Punjab won by 6 wickets
Rawalpindi Cricket Stadium, Rawalpindi
Umpires: Shozab Raza and Rashid Riaz
Player of the match: Khurram Manzoor (Punjab)

- Sindh won the toss and elected to bat.

== Final ==
12 April 2019
Scorecard

Khyber Pakhtunkhwa; 307/7 (50 overs)	v	Baluchistan; 298/9 (50 overs)
Abid Ali 132 (119); Ali Imran 3/48 (10 overs)		Awais Zia 83 (94); Sohail Khan 3/75 (10 overs)

Khyber Pakhtunkhwa won by 9 runs
Rawalpindi Cricket Stadium, Rawalpindi
Umpires: Ahsan Raza and Shozab Raza
Player of the match: Sohail Khan (Khyber Pakhtunkhwa)

- Khyber Pakhtunkhwa won the toss and elected to bat.
