= Waleed Ahmed (cricketer) =

Pakistani cricketer (born 1992)

Personal information
- Born: 4 December 1992 (age 33); Karachi, Pakistan
- Batting: Right-handed
- Bowling: Right arm off-break
- Relatives: Tauseef Ahmed (father)
- Source: Cricinfo, 8 September 2018

Waleed Ahmed (born 4 December 1992) is a Pakistani cricketer. He made his List A debut for Karachi Whites in the 2018–19 Quaid-e-Azam One Day Cup on 6 September 2018. A right-handed off-break bowler like his illustrious father Tauseef Ahmed, Waleed was the leading wicket-taker for Karachi Whites in the tournament, with ten dismissals in five matches.

He made his first-class debut for Karachi Whites in the 2018–19 Quaid-e-Azam Trophy on 8 September 2018. In March 2019, he was named in Punjab's squad for the 2019 Pakistan Cup. In September 2019, he was named in Sindh's squad for the 2019–20 Quaid-e-Azam Trophy tournament. He made his Twenty20 debut on 14 October 2019, for Sindh in the 2019–20 National T20 Cup.
