= Mohammad Nadeem =

Mohammad Nadeem may refer to:

- Mohammad Nadeem (Omani cricketer) (born 1982), Omani international cricketer
- Mohammad Nadeem (Emirati cricketer) (born 1978), Emirati international cricketer
- Mohammed Nadeem (Qatari cricketer) (born 1983), Qatari international cricketer
- Mohammad Nadeem (Pakistani cricketer), Pakistani cricketer

== See also ==
- Muhammad Nadeem (born 1972), Pakistani field hockey player
