= Hasan Qadeer =

Pakistani cricketer (born 1991)

Personal information
- Born: 1 January 1991 (age 35)
- Source: Cricinfo, 30 September 2018

Hasan Qadeer (born 1 January 1991) is a Pakistani cricketer. He made his List A debut for Lahore Blues in the 2018–19 Quaid-e-Azam One Day Cup on 30 September 2018. He made his first-class debut for Lahore Blues in the 2018–19 Quaid-e-Azam Trophy on 13 November 2018.
