= Asad Afridi =

Pakistani cricketer (born 1992)

Personal information
- Born: 30 December 1992 (age 33); Khyber District, Pakistan
- Source: Cricinfo, 2 November 2017

Asad Afridi (born 30 December 1992) is a Pakistani cricketer. He made his first-class debut for Abbottabad against Bahawalpur in the 2013–14 Quaid-e-Azam Trophy on 16 January 2014.

A right-handed batsman, Afridi was the leading run-scorer for Federally Administered Tribal Areas in the 2018–19 Quaid-e-Azam Trophy, with 437 runs in five matches. In March 2019, he was named in the Federal Areas' squad for the 2019 Pakistan Cup.
