= Saeed Khan =

Pakistani cricketer (born 1982)

Personal information
- Born: 4 April 1982 (age 44)
- Source: Cricinfo, 30 September 2018

Saeed Khan (born 4 April 1982) is a Pakistani cricketer. He made his List A debut for Federally Administered Tribal Areas in the 2018–19 Quaid-e-Azam One Day Cup on 30 September 2018. He made his first-class debut for Federally Administered Tribal Areas in the 2018–19 Quaid-e-Azam Trophy on 3 October 2018.
