= Tauseeq Shah =

Pakistani cricketer (born 1995)

Personal information
- Born: 27 December 1995 (age 30)
- Source: Cricinfo, 8 September 2018

Tauseeq Shah (born 27 December 1995) is a Pakistani cricketer. He made his first-class debut for Rawalpindi in the 2018–19 Quaid-e-Azam Trophy on 8 September 2018. He was the joint-leading wicket-taker for Rawalpindi in the tournament, with thirty-two dismissals in six matches.
