= Saadullah Ghauri =

Pakistani cricketer (born 1989)

Personal information
- Born: 17 September 1989 (age 37)
- Source: Cricinfo, 20 August 2018

Saadullah Ghauri (born 17 September 1989) is a Pakistani cricketer. He made his first-class debut for Lahore Shalimar in the 2008–09 Quaid-e-Azam Trophy on 1 February 2009. In April 2018, he played for Zarai Taraqiati Bank Limited (ZTBL) in the final of the Patron's Trophy Grade-II tournament. ZTBL won the match, to qualify for the 2018–19 Quaid-e-Azam Trophy.
