= Samiullah Mehsud =

Pakistani cricketer (born 1998)

Personal information
- Born: 16 May 1998 (age 28)
- Source: Cricinfo, 8 September 2018

Samiullah Mehsud (born 16 May 1998) is a Pakistani cricketer. He made his List A debut for Islamabad in the 2018–19 Quaid-e-Azam One Day Cup on 6 September 2018. He made his first-class debut for Islamabad in the 2018–19 Quaid-e-Azam Trophy on 16 September 2018.
