= Zubair Malik =

Pakistani cricketer (born 1998)

Personal information
- Born: 20 October 1998 (age 28)
- Source: Cricinfo, 26 September 2018

Zubair Malik (born 20 February 1998) is a Pakistani cricketer. He made his first-class debut for Lahore Blues in the 2018–19 Quaid-e-Azam Trophy on 25 September 2018.
