= Mohammad Umar (Lahore Blues cricketer) =

Pakistani cricketer (born 1997)

Personal information
- Born: 29 December 1997 (age 28)
- Source: Cricinfo, 1 September 2018

Mohammad Umar (born 29 December 1997) is a Pakistani cricketer. He made his first-class debut for Lahore Blues in the 2018–19 Quaid-e-Azam Trophy on 1 September 2018. He made his List A debut for Lahore Blues in the 2018–19 Quaid-e-Azam One Day Cup on 6 September 2018.
