= Ali Sarfraz =

Pakistani cricketer (born 1987)

Personal information
- Born: 21 December 1987 (age 38); Rawalpindi, Pakistan
- Batting: Left-handed
- Bowling: Right arm offbreak
- Source: Cricinfo, 16 December 2015

Ali Sarfraz (born 21 December 1987) is a Pakistani cricketer who plays for Islamabad. He was the leading run-scorer for Islamabad in the 2018–19 Quaid-e-Azam Trophy, with 487 runs in five matches.

In September 2019, he was named in Northern's squad for the 2019–20 Quaid-e-Azam Trophy tournament.
