= Ali Rafiq =

Pakistani cricketer (born 1985)

Personal information
- Born: 5 November 1985 (age 41)
- Batting: Left-handed
- Bowling: Right-arm bowler
- Source: Cricinfo, 18 September 2018

Ali Rafiq (born 5 November 1985) is a Pakistani cricketer. He made his first-class debut for Faisalabad in the 2007–08 Quaid-e-Azam Trophy on 1 November 2007. He was the leading run-scorer for Lahore Whites in the 2018–19 Quaid-e-Azam Trophy, with 421 runs in six matches. In January 2021, he was named in Balochistan's squad for the 2020–21 Pakistan Cup.
