= Mohammad Arham =

Pakistani cricketer (born 1999)

Personal information
- Born: 11 August 1999 (age 27); Karak, Khyber Pakhtunkhwa, Pakistan
- Batting: Right-handed
- Bowling: Right-arm medium
- Source: Cricinfo, 1 September 2018

Mohammad Arham (born 11 August 1999) is a Pakistani cricketer. He made his first-class debut for Islamabad in the 2018–19 Quaid-e-Azam Trophy on 1 September 2018. He made his List A debut for Islamabad in the 2018–19 Quaid-e-Azam One Day Cup on 6 September 2018.
