= Tauseeq Ahmed =

Pakistani cricketer (born 1997)

Personal information
- Born: 17 October 1997 (age 29); Karachi, Pakistan
- Source: Cricinfo, 21 October 2018

Tauseeq Ahmed (born 17 October 1997) is a Pakistani cricketer. He made his List A debut for Karachi Whites in the 2018–19 Quaid-e-Azam One Day Cup on 22 September 2018. He made his first-class debut for Karachi Whites in the 2018–19 Quaid-e-Azam Trophy on 19 October 2018.
