= Haseeb Azam =

Pakistani cricketer (born 1986)

Personal information
- Born: 7 October 1986 (age 40); Fatehjang, Pakistan
- Relatives: Hammad Azam (Brother)
- Source: Cricinfo, 21 December 2015

Haseeb Azam (born 7 October 1986) is a Pakistani cricketer who plays for Rawalpindi. He was the joint-leading wicket-taker for Rawalpindi in the 2018–19 Quaid-e-Azam Trophy, with thirty-two dismissals in six matches.
