= Iftikhar Ahmed (cricketer) =

Pakistani cricketer (born 1990)

Personal information
- Born: 3 September 1990 (age 36); Peshawar, Khyber Pakhtunkhwa, Pakistan
- Batting: Right-handed
- Bowling: Right-arm off break
- Role: Middle-order batter

International information
- National side: Pakistan (2015–2024)
- Test debut (cap 221): 11 August 2016 v England
- Last Test: 4 March 2022 v Australia
- ODI debut (cap 207): 13 November 2015 v England
- Last ODI: 11 November 2023 v England
- ODI shirt no.: 95
- T20I debut (cap 69): 4 March 2016 v Sri Lanka
- Last T20I: 09 June 2024 v India
- T20I shirt no.: 95

Domestic team information
- Years: Team
- 2016, 2019–2020: Karachi Kings
- 2010–2015: Peshawar Panthers
- 2011–2018: WAPDA
- 2017: Peshawar Zalmi
- 2018, 2021: Islamabad United (squad no. 95)
- 2019–2023: Khyber Pakhtunkhwa
- 2022–2023: Quetta Gladiators (squad no. 95)
- 2024-2025: Multan Sultans (squad no. 95)
- 2026: Peshawar Zalmi (squad no. 95)

Career statistics
Competition	Test	ODI	T20I	FC
Matches	4	28	66	80
Runs scored	61	614	998	5,283
Batting average	12.20	38.37	24.34	42.60
100s/50s	0/0	1/1	0/4	15/28
Top score	27	109*	62*	181
Balls bowled	206	796	295	5,488
Wickets	1	16	8	82
Bowling average	161.0	46.37	43.62	30.48
5 wickets in innings	0	1	0	1
10 wickets in match	0	0	0	0
Best bowling	1/1	5/40	3/24	6/39
Catches/stumpings	2/–	17/–	26/–	86/–
- Source: ESPNcricinfo, 14 March 2025

Iftikhar Ahmed (Urdu & Pashto: افتخار احمد; born 3 September 1990) is a Pakistani international cricketer. Who plays for Peshawar Zalmi in the Pakistan Super League, he has previously played for Karachi Kings, Islamabad United, Quetta Gladiators and Multan Sultans. He made his international debut for the Pakistan cricket team in November 2015.

== Early life ==
He was born in Peshawar, Pakistan into a Pashtun family.

He has built a cricket stadium in his home village so the local talent can develop.

== Domestic career ==
He was the leading run-scorer for Sui Northern Gas Pipelines Limited in the 2017–18 Quaid-e-Azam Trophy, with 735 runs in eleven matches.

On 27 January 2017, he made 131 not out and took 3 wickets for 12 runs in the final of the 2016–17 Regional One Day Cup. He was jointly named man of the match along with Gauhar Ali. He was the leading run-scorer for Khyber Pakhtunkhwa in the 2017 Pakistan Cup, with 244 runs in four matches.

In April 2018, he was named in Sindh's squad for the 2018 Pakistan Cup. In Sindh's opening fixture of the tournament, he scored 116 runs against Balochistan, and was named the man of the match, as Sindh won by 12 runs. He scored the most runs for Sindh during the tournament, with 230 runs in four matches.

He was the leading run-scorer for Sui Northern Gas Pipelines Limited in the 2018–19 Quaid-e-Azam Trophy, with 660 runs in seven matches. In March 2019, he was named in Punjab's squad for the 2019 Pakistan Cup.

In September 2019, he was named in Khyber Pakhtunkhwa's squad for the 2019–20 Quaid-e-Azam Trophy tournament. In October 2021, he led Khyber Pakhtunkhwa's successful title defence in the 2021–22 National T20 Cup, and was named both the player of the final and the player of the tournament.

== T20 franchise career ==
In September 2018, he was named in Kandahar's squad in the first edition of the Afghanistan Premier League tournament.

In January 2023, while playing for Fortune Barishal in the 2022–23 Bangladesh Premier League, he hit his maiden T20 century.

In Season 9 of HBL PSL Iftikhar will be the part of Multan Sultans.

He was signed to play for Rangpur Riders in the 2025 Bangladesh Premier League. He was also selected to play for Guyana Amazon Warriors in the 2025 Caribbean Premier League. In the 2026 HBL Pakistan Super League player auction, Ahmed was signed by Peshawar Zalmi for PKR 1.8 crore.

== International career ==
He was the top-scorer for Pakistan A in their two-day match against England in October 2015. He made his One Day International debut on 13 November 2015 during the same tour. He made his Test debut against England on 11 August 2016.

He was initially selected in Pakistan's squad for the 2016 ICC World Twenty20 tournament, but he was later dropped due to poor form. However, he made his Twenty20 International debut for Pakistan against Sri Lanka in the 2016 Asia Cup on 4 March 2016.

In September 2019, he was included in the 16-man squad for Pakistan's series against Sri Lanka. He was one of three players who were called back to the team. In May 2020, the Pakistan Cricket Board (PCB) awarded him with a central contract ahead of the 2020–21 season.

In June 2020, he was named in a 29-man squad for Pakistan's tour to England during the COVID-19 pandemic. On 1 November 2020, in the second match against Zimbabwe, Iftikhar took his first five-wicket haul in ODI cricket.

In May 2024, he was named in Pakistan’s squad for the 2024 ICC Men's T20 World Cup tournament.
