= Mansoor Ali =

Pakistani cricketer (born 2001)

Personal information
- Born: 12 January 2001 (age 25); Abbottabad, Pakistan
- Source: Cricinfo, 28 September 2018

Mansoor Ali (born 12 January 2001) is a Pakistani cricketer. He made his first-class debut for Zarai Taraqiati Bank Limited in the 2018–19 Quaid-e-Azam Trophy on 25 September 2018. He made his List A debut for Zarai Taraqiati Bank Limited in the 2018–19 Quaid-e-Azam One Day Cup on 24 October 2018.
