= Mohammad Nadeem (Pakistani cricketer) =

Pakistani cricketer

Personal information
- Full name: Mohammad Nadeem
- Source: Cricinfo, 23 September 2018

Mohammad Nadeem is a Pakistani cricketer. He made his first-class debut for Islamabad in the 2018–19 Quaid-e-Azam Trophy on 1 September 2018. He was the leading wicket-taker for Islamabad in the tournament, with twenty-five dismissals in six matches.
