= Hazrat Shah =

Pakistani cricketer (born 1995)

Personal information
- Born: 10 March 1995 (age 31); Dir, Pakistan
- Batting: Right-handed
- Bowling: Right-arm medium fast
- Source: Cricinfo, 15 December 2015

Hazrat Shah (born 10 March 1995) is a Pakistani first-class cricketer who plays for Hyderabad.
