= Tabish Khan =

Pakistani cricketer

Personal information
- Born: 12 December 1984 (age 41); Karachi, Pakistan
- Batting: Right handed
- Bowling: Right-arm fast-medium
- Role: Bowler

International information
- National side: Pakistan (2021)
- Only Test (cap 245): 7 May 2021 v Zimbabwe

Domestic team information
- Years: Team
- 2014/15—2015/16: Sui Southern Gas Company
- 2016: Karachi Whites
- 2017/18—2018/19: Pakistan Television
- 2018: Karachi Kings
- 2019— 2022: Sindh
- 2023—present: Karachi Whites
- Source: Cricinfo, 7 May 2021

Tabish Khan (born 12 December 1984) is a Pakistani former cricketer who plays for Sindh. He made his international debut for the Pakistan cricket team in May 2021.

== Domestic career ==
Khan made his first-class debut at the age of 17 and built a reputation as one of the most consistent fast bowlers in Pakistan's domestic circuit. Despite performing strongly over many seasons, he remained outside national selection for a prolonged period. His sustained performances for teams such as Karachi Whites and Pakistan Television highlighted his effectiveness even on traditionally slow pitches in Karachi.

In November 2017, he was selected to play for the Karachi Kings in 2018 Pakistan Super League players draft.

He was the leading wicket-taker for Pakistan Television in the 2017–18 Quaid-e-Azam Trophy, with 37 dismissals in six matches. In September 2018, in round two of the 2018–19 Quaid-e-Azam Trophy, he took figures of 8 for 41 for Pakistan Television against Lahore Blues. He finished the tournament as the leading wicket-taker for Pakistan Television, with twenty-eight dismissals in five matches. In September 2019, he was named in Sindh's squad for the 2019–20 Quaid-e-Azam Trophy tournament.

During the 2016–17 Quaid-e-Azam Trophy, Khan produced one of his most notable domestic performances when he took match figures of 11 for 76 for Karachi Whites, including six wickets in the first innings and five in the second.

In November 2021, in the 2021–22 Quaid-e-Azam Trophy, Tabish took his 600th first-class wicket.

== International career ==
In January 2021, he was named in Pakistan's Test squad for their series against South Africa. In March 2021, he was again named in Pakistan's Test squad, this time for their series against Zimbabwe. He made his Test debut for Pakistan, against Zimbabwe, on 7 May 2021. Making his debut at the age of 36, he became the third-oldest Pakistani Test debutant. Khan was also the oldest Test debutant for Pakistan in 66 years, and only Khalid "Billy" Ibadulla played more first-class games (218) than him (137) before making their Test debut for Pakistan.

His selection at the age of 36 was widely viewed as recognition of his long-standing consistency in domestic cricket after years of strong performances.
