= Khalilullah (cricketer) =

Pakistani cricketer (born 1990)

Personal information
- Full name: Khalilullah Khan
- Born: 1 December 1990 (age 35)
- Batting: Right-handed
- Bowling: Right arm offbreak
- Source: Cricinfo, 1 September 2018

Khalilullah (born 1 December 1990) is a Pakistani cricketer. He made his first-class debut for Abbottabad in the 2012–13 Quaid-e-Azam Trophy on 8 January 2013.
