= Anas Mustafa =

Pakistani cricketer (born 2000)

Personal information
- Born: 20 May 2000 (age 26)
- Source: Cricinfo, 6 September 2018

Anas Mustafa (born 20 May 2000) is a Pakistani cricketer. He made his List A debut for Zarai Taraqiati Bank Limited in the 2018–19 Quaid-e-Azam One Day Cup on 6 September 2018. He made his first-class debut for Zarai Taraqiati Bank Limited in the 2018–19 Quaid-e-Azam Trophy on 8 September 2018. He was the leading run-scorer for Zarai Taraqiati Bank Limited in the tournament, with 385 runs in six matches.
