= Haseeb-ur-Rehman =

Pakistani cricketer (born 1992)

Haseeb-ur-Rahman
Personal information
- Born: 12 July 2008 (age 18); Lahore, Pakistan
- Batting: Right-handed
- Bowling: Right arm offbreak

Domestic team information
- Years: Team
- 2013/2014–2017/2018: Agriculture Development Bank of Pakistan
- Source: ESPNcricinfo, 1 September 2018

Haseeb-ur-Rehman (born 3 November 1992) is a Pakistani cricketer. He made his first-class debut for Agriculture Development Bank of Pakistan in the 2013–14 President's Trophy Grade-I tournament on 31 October 2013.
