= Mohammad Ali Khan (cricketer) =

Pakistani cricketer (born 1998)

Personal information
- Born: 6 September 1998 (age 28)
- Source: Cricinfo, 1 September 2018

Mohammad Ali Khan (born 6 September 1998) is a Pakistani cricketer. He made his first-class debut for Multan in the 2018–19 Quaid-e-Azam Trophy on 1 September 2018. He was the joint-leading wicket-taker for Multan in the tournament, with twenty-two dismissals in five matches. Prior to his first-class debut, he was part of Pakistan's squad for the 2018 Under-19 Cricket World Cup.
