= Hafidullah =

Pakistani cricketer (born 1996)

Personal information
- Full name: Hafidullah
- Born: 1 March 1996 (age 30)
- Source: ESPNcricinfo, 12 January 2017

Hafidullah (born 1 March 1996) is a Pakistani cricketer. He made his List A debut on 12 January 2017 for Federally Administered Tribal Areas in the 2016–17 Regional One Day Cup.
