= Mohammad Ilyas (cricketer, born 1999) =

Pakistani cricketer

Personal information
- Born: 21 March 1999 (age 27); Peshawar, Khyber Pakhtunkhwa, Pakistan
- Height: 5 ft 9 in (175 cm)
- Batting: Right-handed
- Bowling: Right-arm medium
- Role: Bowler

Domestic team information
- Years: Team
- 2019–2020; 2023: Multan Sultans
- 2021-2022: Karachi Kings (squad no. 91)
- Source: Cricinfo, 3 December 2018

Mohammad Ilyas (born 21 March 1999) is a Pakistani cricketer who plays for the Karachi Kings.

== Early life ==
Born in Peshawar into a religious family, Ilyas has ten brothers and six sisters.

== Domestic career ==
He made his List A debut for Peshawar in the 2018–19 Quaid-e-Azam One Day Cup on 13 September 2018. He made his first-class debut for Peshawar in the 2018–19 Quaid-e-Azam Trophy on 11 October 2018, taking a five-wicket haul in each innings.

In December 2018, he was named in Pakistan's team for the 2018 ACC Emerging Teams Asia Cup. He made his Twenty20 debut for the Multan Sultans in the 2019 Pakistan Super League on 15 February 2019.

In July 2019, he was selected to play for the Belfast Titans in the inaugural edition of the Euro T20 Slam cricket tournament. However, the following month the tournament was cancelled.

In September 2019, he was named in Khyber Pakhtunkhwa's squad for the 2019–20 Quaid-e-Azam Trophy tournament. In December 2021, he was signed by the Karachi Kings following the players' draft for the 2022 Pakistan Super League.
