= Asad Baig =

Pakistani cricketer (born 1988)

Personal information
- Born: 26 November 1988 (age 37)
- Source: Cricinfo, 1 September 2018

Asad Baig (born 26 November 1988) is a Pakistani cricketer. He made his first-class debut for Pakistan Customs in the 2009–10 Quaid-e-Azam Trophy on 10 October 2009.
