= Imran Rafiq =

Pakistani cricketer (born 1996)

Personal information
- Full name: Mohammad Imran Rafiq
- Born: 3 November 1996 (age 30); Dera Ghazi Khan, Punjab, Pakistan
- Height: 5 ft 5 in (165 cm)
- Batting: Left-handed

Domestic team information
- Years: Team
- 2019-present: Southern Punjab
- Source: Cricinfo, 26 September 2017

Imran Rafiq (born 3 November 1996) is a Pakistani cricketer. He made his first-class debut for Sui Northern Gas Pipelines Limited in the 2017–18 Quaid-e-Azam Trophy on 26 September 2017. He made his List A debut for Multan in the 2018–19 Quaid-e-Azam One Day Cup on 6 September 2018. He was the leading run-scorer for Multan in the 2018–19 Quaid-e-Azam Trophy, with 610 runs in seven matches.

In March 2019, he was named in Sindh's squad for the 2019 Pakistan Cup. In September 2019, he was named in Southern Punjab's squad for the 2019–20 Quaid-e-Azam Trophy tournament. In November 2019, he was named in Pakistan's squad for the 2019 ACC Emerging Teams Asia Cup in Bangladesh.
