= Waqar Malik =

Pakistani cricketer (born 1995)

Personal information
- Born: 15 February 1995 (age 31)
- Source: Cricinfo, 8 September 2018

Waqar Malik (born 15 February 1995) is a Pakistani cricketer. He made his first-class debut for Water and Power Development Authority in the 2018–19 Quaid-e-Azam Trophy on 8 September 2018.
