= Usman Ashraf (Pakistani cricketer) =

Pakistani cricketer (born 1989)

Personal information
- Born: 15 December 1989 (age 36); Gujranwala, Pakistan
- Source: Cricinfo, 20 August 2018

Usman Ashraf (born 15 December 1989) is a Pakistani cricketer. He made his first-class debut for Islamabad in the 2010–11 Quaid-e-Azam Trophy on 22 November 2010. In April 2018, he played for Zarai Taraqiati Bank Limited (ZTBL) in the final of the Patron's Trophy Grade-II tournament. ZTBL won the match, to qualify for the 2018–19 Quaid-e-Azam Trophy.
