= Hammad Azam =

Pakistani cricketer

Hammad Azam حماد اعظم
Personal information
- Born: 16 March 1991 (age 35); Fateh Jang, Punjab, Pakistan
- Height: 1.89 m (6 ft 2 in)
- Batting: Right-handed
- Bowling: Right-arm fast-medium
- Role: All-rounder
- Relatives: Haseeb Azam (Brother)

International information
- National side: Pakistan (2011–2015)
- ODI debut (cap 180): 23 April 2011 v West Indies
- Last ODI: 31 May 2015 v Zimbabwe
- T20I debut (cap 46): 23 February 2012 v England
- Last T20I: 28 July 2013 v West Indies

Domestic team information
- Years: Team
- 2008–present: Rawalpindi
- 2010–present: National Bank of Pakistan
- 2010–2015: Rawalpindi Rams
- 2012: Khulna Royal Bengals
- 2012: Uva Next
- 2016: Lahore Qalandars
- 2018; 2020: Peshawar Zalmi
- 2019: Multan Sultans
- 2019–present: Northern
- 2021-present: Golden State Grizzlies

Career statistics
| Competition | ODI | T20I | FC | LA |
|---|---|---|---|---|
| Matches | 11 | 5 | 96 | 103 |
| Runs scored | 80 | 34 | 4,063 | 1,919 |
| Batting average | 16.00 | 11.33 | 33.57 | 28.64 |
| 100s/50s | 0/0 | 0/0 | 6/22 | 0/11 |
| Top score | 36 | 21 | 157 | 93* |
| Balls bowled | 198 | 0 | 8,339 | 3,151 |
| Wickets | 2 | – | 180 | 78 |
| Bowling average | 84.50 | – | 21.72 | 32.92 |
| 5 wickets in innings | 0 | – | 4 | 0 |
| 10 wickets in match | 0 | – | 1 | 0 |
| Best bowling | 1/21 | – | 10/70 | 4/57 |
| Catches/stumpings | 4/– | 0/– | 60/– | 34/– |
- Source: ESPNcricinfo, 27 December 2019

Hammad Azam (Punjabi: حماد اعظم; born 16 March 1991) is a Pakistani-born cricketer who plays in the Major League Cricket. Before his retirement in July 2023, he played for the Pakistan national cricket team between 2011 and 2015. He is a right-handed batman and a right-arm medium fast bowler.

== Domestic and franchise career ==
In April 2018, he was named in Khyber Pakhtunkhwa's squad for the 2018 Pakistan Cup. In March 2019, he was named in Sindh's squad for the 2019 Pakistan Cup. He was named the best all-rounder of the tournament, after scoring 144 runs and taking nine wickets.

In September 2019, he was named in Northern's squad for the 2019–20 Quaid-e-Azam Trophy tournament. In January 2021, he was named in Northern's squad for the 2020–21 Pakistan Cup. Following the conclusion of the competition, he was named the player of the tournament.

In April 2021, he was one of four Pakistani cricketers to travel to the United States to take part in the Houston Open T20 Cricket League. In June 2021, he was selected as a member of the Golden State Grizzlies in the Minor League Cricket tournament in the United States following the players' draft.

== International career ==
An all-rounder, Azam made his first-class debut in 2008 for Rawalpindi. He had played just six first-class games before being selected in the Pakistan squad for the U-19 World Cup in New Zealand.

His performance in the tournament was impressive, scoring 173 runs in six matches and getting dismissed only once. His unbeaten 92 against West Indies in the semi-final guided Pakistan to the final of the tournament. He was immediately selected in the Pakistan squad for the Twenty20 International against Australia.

=== One Day Internationals ===
On 23 April 2011, Azam along with Mohammad Salman and Junaid Khan made their one-day international debuts against West Indies in St. Lucia. On 25 April 2011, Azam took his first wicket, of Marlon Samuels, in the second Digicel ODI against West Indies in St.Lucia.

=== Twenty20 International ===
On 23 February 2012, Azam made his T20I debut against England at Dubai. He did not get to bat or bowl in the game, however, in the next game, he scored 21 off 15 balls including three 4s and one 6 before being caught off Ravi Bopara's bowling. He has played 5 T20I matches till date.

== See also ==
- Pakistan U-19 cricket team
