= Irfan Haider =

Pakistani cricketer (born 1985)

Personal information
- Born: 1 October 1985 (age 41)
- Source: Cricinfo, 11 September 2018

Irfan Haider (born 1 October 1985) is a Pakistani cricketer. He made his first-class debut for Pakistan Telecommunication Company Limited in the 2003–04 Patron's Trophy on 12 January 2004.
