= Bilawal Bhatti =

Pakistani cricketer (born 1991)

Personal information
- Born: 17 September 1991 (age 35); Muridke, Punjab, Pakistan
- Height: 168 cm (5 ft 6 in)
- Batting: Right-handed
- Bowling: Right-arm fast-medium
- Role: All-rounder

International information
- National side: Pakistan (2013–2015)
- Test debut (cap 217): 31 December 2013 v Sri Lanka
- Last Test: 8 January 2014 v Sri Lanka
- ODI debut (cap 195): 24 November 2013 v South Africa
- Last ODI: 3 February 2015 v New Zealand
- ODI shirt no.: 80
- T20I debut (cap 56): 20 November 2013 v South Africa
- Last T20I: 24 May 2015 v Zimbabwe
- T20I shirt no.: 80

Domestic team information
- Years: Team
- 2012–2015: Sialkot Stallions
- 2016: Karachi Kings
- 2017: Lahore Qalandars
- 2020: Multan Sultans (squad no. 80)

Career statistics
Competition	ODI	T20I	FC	LA
Matches	10	9	74	79
Runs scored	89	23	1,605	488
Batting average	14.83	11.5	17.44	11.61
100s/50s	0/0	0/0	2/4	0/0
Top score	39	13	106	39
Balls bowled	409	156	12,261	3,747
Wickets	6	5	304	105
Bowling average	48.34	39.5	23.27	30.72
5 wickets in innings	0	0	12	0
10 wickets in match	0	0	2	0
Best bowling	3/37	2/36	8/56	4/49
Catches/stumpings	0/–	1/–	31/–	20/–
Medal record
Representing Pakistan
Men's Cricket
Asian Games
Bronze medal – third place	2010 Guangzhou	Team
- Source: ESPN Cricinfo, 28 September 2017

Bilawal Bhatti (born 17 September 1991) is an international cricketer from Pakistan, primarily utilized as an all-rounder. He made his ODI debut against South Africa in Cape Town in 2013, and made his mark immediately with both bat and ball, hitting 39 off 25 balls, and taking 3 for 37 in a Pakistan win.

In the final of the 2015–16 Quaid-e-Azam Trophy, Bhatti recorded his best figures in first-class cricket with 8 for 88, and his best overall match figures, with 11 for 95.

== Domestic and franchise career ==
Bhatti began to play for Sialkot Stallions in 2012 till 2015.

In 2017, Bhatti was chosen by the Lahore Qalanders franchise to compete in the forthcoming third season of the Pakistan Super League (PSL), however a shoulder injury meant he was unable to take any part in the league.

He was the leading wicket-taker for Sui Northern Gas Pipelines Limited in the 2018–19 Quaid-e-Azam Trophy, with 36 dismissals in ten matches. In March 2019, he was named in Punjab's squad for the 2019 Pakistan Cup.

In September 2019, he was named in Southern Punjab's squad for the 2019–20 Quaid-e-Azam Trophy tournament.

== International career ==
In November 2010, Bhatti was part of the team at the Asian Games in Guangzhou, China which won a bronze medal by beating Sri Lanka in the 3rd place playoffs.

On 20 November 2013, he was included in national team to represent in T20 for Pakistan against South Africa. Bilawal played his first test against Sri Lanka and enjoyed a fine debut, taking 5 wickets in 2 innings. In second test, he contributed 24 not out in the first innings, before getting 32 runs in the second innings.

It went downhill from there however, as he conceded 30 runs in an over vs Australia at the WT20 2014, while bowling to Maxwell and Finch. He also conceded 93 runs in the 2nd ODI vs New Zealand in 2015, equaling the record of the most expensive figures for a Pakistani bowler with Wahab Riaz.
