= Mohammad Talha =

Pakistani cricketer

Personal information
- Born: 15 October 1988 (age 38); Faisalabad, Punjab, Pakistan
- Batting: Right-handed
- Bowling: Right-arm fast-medium
- Role: Bowler

International information
- National side: Pakistan (2009–2014)
- Test debut (cap 192): 1 March 2009 v Sri Lanka
- Last Test: 16 January 2014 v Sri Lanka
- ODI debut (cap 197): 2 March 2014 v India
- Last ODI: 8 March 2014 v Sri Lanka
- ODI shirt no.: 99

Domestic team information
- Years: Team
- 2007/08–2017/18: Faisalabad
- 2008/09–2010/11: Punjab
- 2008/09–2011/12: National Bank of Pakistan

Career statistics
Competition	Test	ODI	FC	LA
Matches	4	3	95	73
Runs scored	34	0	1,521	314
Batting average	8.50	0.00	13.82	8.97
100s/50s	0/0	0/0	0/6	0/0
Top score	19	0	76	49
Balls bowled	740	122	16,345	3,629
Wickets	9	4	332	115
Bowling average	56.00	36.50	30.64	30.13
5 wickets in innings	0	0	20	2
10 wickets in match	0	0	4	0
Best bowling	3/65	2/22	7/77	6/38
Catches/stumpings	1/–	0/–	24/–	13/–
- Source: ESPNcricinfo, 8 August 2025

Mohammad Talha (born 15 October 1988) is a Pakistani international cricketer. He is a right-arm fast-medium bowler. He has gained an increasing reputation in Pakistani for quick bowling, eventually leading to his selection for the national squad for the February 2009 test series against Sri Lanka.

== Domestic career ==
Though relatively inexperienced, he was first noticed in the 2005 Afro-Asia Cup playing for the Pakistan U-19s, able to extract bounce and sharp burst of speed. However, injuries limited his performance in the following year. His performance in the 2008–09 Quaid-e-Azam Trophy gained him recognition, playing for National Bank of Pakistan. Alongside a fellow young pace newcomer Mohammad Aamer, he gained his first ten-wicket haul against Pakistan Customs, taking 10 for 119 in the match. Halfway through the season, he had 34 wickets in six games.

He worked extensively with Aaqib Javaid at the National Cricket Academy based in Karachi, where he slightly re-modified his action to avoid persistent injuries. Javaid said of Talha that he believed him to be close to national team selection and that he was the fastest bowler in Pakistan after Shoaib Akhtar.

In an interview, Talha commented on his desire to be known as a genuine fast bowler and to represent Pakistan at the highest level, "I want to be a 145kp/h+ bowler. I don't want to get slower, I just want to get faster and faster."

In the home test series against Sri Lanka in 2009, he was chosen for the 15-man squad for both the first and second test. For the first test he was overlooked for pacemen Sohail Khan and all-rounder Yasir Arafat.

== Early career and personal life ==
Talha grew up in Faisalabad, where he began playing tape ball cricket, encouraged by his elder brother. Talha has a daughter named Rumaan and lives in Hajia Bad. He received his early education from the Government School in Hajia Bab. In 2003, he went for the Under-16s trial in the Faisalabad region and was selected but admits to not having the stamina at the time for longer version of the game. He has said that, like many young Pakistani bowlers of the current era, Wasim Akram and Waqar Younis were his cricketing idols whilst growing up and also added that Brett Lee was also someone he tried to learn from. He has modeled his bowling action on that Lee's.

== International career ==
Talha made his test debut against Sri Lanka on 1 March 2009. Although he failed to impress after bowling 17 overs, he gave away 88 runs and took the wicket of M. Muralitharan, who was batting at number 9. The match was cancelled due to an attack on the Sri Lankan team. He was recalled to the Pakistan team in 2014 to play again against Sri Lanka. This time, he bowled brilliantly and took wickets in both innings. He made his ODI debut against India and bowled well, taking 2 for 22 in 7 overs. In the next two games, he gave away 1–68 in 7 overs against Bangladesh and 1–56 in 6.2 overs against Sri Lanka in the final. He was a part of Pakistan's 2014 ICC World Twenty 20 tournament squad but had to sit on the bench during the whole tournament.
