= Usman Saeed =

Pakistani cricketer (born 1986)

Personal information
- Full name: Mohammad Usman Saeed
- Born: 8 October 1986 (age 40); Rawalpindi, Punjab, Pakistan
- Batting: Right-handed
- Bowling: Leg break
- Role: Batsman

Domestic team information
- Years: Team
- 2003/04–2018/19: Rawalpindi
- 2004/05–2014/15: Rawalpindi Rams
- 2005/06–2006/07: Khan Research Laboratories
- 2007/08–2011/12: Federal Areas
- 2008/09–2009/10: Federal Areas Leopards
- 2010/11: Pakistan Television
- 2012/13–2013/14: State Bank of Pakistan

Career statistics
| Competition | First-class | List A | Twenty20 |
|---|---|---|---|
| Matches | 124 | 70 | 20 |
| Runs scored | 6,116 | 1,966 | 300 |
| Batting average | 32.02 | 37.80 | 23.07 |
| 100s/50s | 8/39 | 2/12 | 0/0 |
| Top score | 243 | 120* | 41* |
| Balls bowled | 174 | 102 | – |
| Wickets | 1 | 0 | – |
| Bowling average | 102.00 | – | – |
| 5 wickets in innings | 0 | 0 | – |
| 10 wickets in match | 0 | – | – |
| Best bowling | 1/19 | – | – |
| Catches/stumpings | 50/– | 14/– | 4/– |
- Source: Cricinfo, 4 May 2026

Mohammad Usman Saeed (born 8 October 1986) is a Pakistani former cricketer who played as a right-handed batsman. He was born in Rawalpindi, Punjab, and played domestic cricket for Rawalpindi, Rawalpindi Rams, Khan Research Laboratories, Federal Areas, Pakistan Television, and State Bank of Pakistan.

Saeed represented the Pakistan Under-19s at the 2004 Under-19 Cricket World Cup in Bangladesh. Pakistan won the tournament, defeating West Indies Under-19s by 25 runs in the final at the Bangabandhu National Stadium in Dhaka. Saeed played four Youth One Day International matches in the tournament, scoring 76 runs at an average of 38.00, with a highest score of 40 against West Indies Under-19s in the group stage. He also made 19 in Pakistan's five-wicket semi-final win over India Under-19s, a match that featured future international players including Shikhar Dhawan, Suresh Raina, Dinesh Karthik, Fawad Alam and Riaz Afridi.

Saeed made his senior List A debut for Rawalpindi against Hyderabad in March 2004 and his first-class debut later the same month against Multan at Rawalpindi. He later played for Attock Refinery Limited in the PCB Patron's Trophy Grade II, taking four wickets in the 2004–05 competition, before establishing himself in senior domestic cricket with Rawalpindi and Khan Research Laboratories.

His highest first-class score came in October 2007, when he made 243 for Rawalpindi against Abbottabad in the 2007–08 Quaid-e-Azam Trophy at the Abbottabad Cricket Stadium. The innings came from 471 balls and helped Rawalpindi reach 601 in reply to Abbottabad's 376, in a match that was drawn.

In October 2008, playing for Federal Areas against Sindh in the Pentangular Cup at the National Stadium, Karachi, Saeed scored an unbeaten 103 after his side had been reduced to 88 for five. He also played for Federal Areas Leopards in the 2008–09 RBS Pentangular One Day Cup. In December 2008, he scored 44 from 55 balls against North West Frontier Province Panthers in a one-run victory that took Federal Areas Leopards into the final.

Saeed also played for Pakistan National Academy. In August 2006, he scored 129 from 147 balls against Bangladesh National Academy at the Jinnah Stadium, Sialkot, helping Pakistan National Academy win by 52 runs and take an unassailable 2–0 lead in the four-match series.

Across his senior career, Saeed scored 6,116 runs in 124 first-class matches at an average of 32.02, including eight centuries and 39 half-centuries. He also scored 1,966 runs in 70 List A matches at an average of 37.80, including two centuries and 12 half-centuries, and 300 runs in 20 Twenty20 matches.
