= Waqar Anwar =

Pakistani cricketer (born 1989)

Personal information
- Born: 26 August 1989 (age 37); Gujranwala, Pakistan
- Source: ESPNcricinfo, 14 November 2016

Waqar Anwar (born 26 August 1989) is a Pakistani cricketer. He made his first-class debut for Karachi Blues in the 2013–14 Quaid-e-Azam Trophy on 23 October 2013.
