= Mohammad Irfan (cricketer, born October 1989) =

Pakistani cricketer (born 1989)

Personal information
- Born: 31 October 1989 (age 37); Lahore, Punjab, Pakistan
- Source: Cricinfo, 1 November 2015

Mohammad Irfan (born 31 October 1989) is a Pakistani cricketer. He was the leading wicket-taker for Lahore Whites in the 2018–19 Quaid-e-Azam Trophy, with thirty-four dismissals in seven matches. He was also the leading wicket-taker in the 2018–19 Quaid-e-Azam One Day Cup, with twenty dismissals in nine matches.
