= Mohammad Ilyas (cricketer, born 1996) =

Pakistani cricketer (born 1996)

Personal information
- Born: 25 June 1996 (age 30); Lahore, Pakistan

Domestic team information
- Years: Team
- 2018/19: Lahore Blues
- Source: Cricinfo, 18 September 2018

Mohammad Ilyas (born 25 June 1996) is a Pakistani cricketer. He made his first-class debut for Lahore Blues in the 2018–19 Quaid-e-Azam Trophy on 16 September 2018. He made his List A debut for Lahore Blues in the 2018–19 Quaid-e-Azam One Day Cup on 22 September 2018.
