= Zarai Taraqiati Bank Limited cricket team =

Cricket team

Zarai Taraqiati Bank Limited
Personnel
- Captain: (Pakistan) Abdul Razzaq
- Coach: (Pakistan)
- Owner: Zarai Taraqiati Bank Limited

Team information
- Colours
- Official website: www.ztbl.com.pk

The Zarai Taraqiati Bank Limited cricket team, formerly known as Agriculture Development Bank of Pakistan cricket team, was a first-class cricket side in Pakistan. It was sponsored by the Zarai Taraqiati Bank Limited. In May 2019, then Prime Minister Imran Khan revamped the domestic cricket structure in Pakistan, excluding departmental teams like Zarai Taraqiati Bank Limited in favour of regional sides. The decision and the Pakistan Cricket Board (PCB) were criticised for removing departmental sides, with players voicing their concern to revive the teams.

== Playing history ==
As the Agriculture Development Bank of Pakistan, the team played 148 first-class matches from 1985–86 to 2001–02, with 45 wins, 26 losses and 77 draws. When the bank changed its name and structure in 2002, the team also changed its name, beginning with the 2002–03 season, to Zarai Taraqiati Bank Limited. Under the name Zarai Taraqiati Bank Limited, they played 267 matches, with 86 wins, 68 losses and 113 draws.

In April 2018, they won the Patron's Trophy Grade-II tournament to qualify for the 2018–19 Quaid-e-Azam Trophy. They won their opening match of the tournament, against Lahore Blues, by 151 runs. However, they finished bottom of their group, and were relegated back to the second-tier for the next season. They also finished bottom of their group in the 2018–19 Quaid-e-Azam One Day Cup, winning just one of their seven games.

== Honours ==
- Quaid-e-Azam (1)
- 1988–89
- Patron's Trophy (3)
- 1990–91
- 1993–94
- 1995–96

== See also ==
- Pakistan Cricket Board
- List of Zarai Taraqiati Bank Limited cricketers
