= 2018–19 Quaid-e-Azam One Day Cup =

Cricket tournament

- Dates: 6 September – 4 November 2018
- Administrator: Pakistan Cricket Board
- Cricket format: List A cricket
- Tournament format(s): Round-robin and knockout
- Champions: Habib Bank Limited (1st title)
- Participants: 16
- Matches: 63
- Most runs: Salman Butt (559)
- Most wickets: Mohammad Irfan (20)
- Official website: PCB

The 2018–19 Quaid-e-Azam One Day Cup was the first edition of the Quaid-e-Azam One Day Cup, a List A cricket tournament that took place in Pakistan from 6 September to 4 November 2018. Each match was played after the conclusion of the corresponding first-class fixture in the 2018–19 Quaid-e-Azam Trophy.

Following the conclusion of the group stage, National Bank of Pakistan, Khan Research Laboratories, Habib Bank Limited and Islamabad from Pool A along with Sui Southern Gas Corporation, Pakistan Television, Water and Power Development Authority and Multan from Pool B had all qualified for the quarter-finals.

In the first quarter-final match, Water and Power Development Authority beat National Bank of Pakistan by eight wickets. In the second quarter-final, Habib Bank Limited beat Sui Southern Gas Company by 166 runs, with Jamal Anwar scoring a century. The third quarter-final saw Khan Research Laboratories beat Multan by six wickets. In the last quarter-final match, Pakistan Television beat Islamabad by nine runs, with Mohammad Waqas and Hasan Mohsin both scoring centuries.

The first semi-final match saw Water and Power Development Authority beat Khan Research Laboratories by five wickets to advance to the final. In the second semi-final, Habib Bank Limited beat Pakistan Television by seven runs. In the final Habib Bank Limited beat Water and Power Development Authority by 62 runs to win the tournament.

== Teams ==
The following teams competed in the 2018–19 tournament:

Regional

- Federally Administered Tribal Areas
- Islamabad
- Karachi Whites
- Lahore Blues
- Lahore Whites
- Multan
- Peshawar
- Rawalpindi

Department

- Habib Bank Limited
- Khan Research Laboratories
- National Bank of Pakistan
- Pakistan Television
- Sui Northern Gas Pipelines Limited
- Sui Southern Gas Company
- Water and Power Development Authority
- Zarai Taraqiati Bank Limited

== Points table ==
Pool A

Team	Pld	W	L	T	NR	Pts
National Bank of Pakistan	7	6	1	0	0	12
Khan Research Laboratories	7	5	2	0	0	10
Habib Bank Limited	7	4	3	0	0	8
Islamabad	7	4	3	0	0	8
Peshawar	7	3	4	0	0	6
Sui Northern Gas Pipelines Limited	7	3	4	0	0	6
Federally Administered Tribal Areas	7	2	5	0	0	4
Lahore Whites	7	1	6	0	0	2

Team qualified for the Knockout stage

Pool B

Team	Pld	W	L	T	NR	Pts
Sui Southern Gas Corporation	7	6	1	0	0	12
Pakistan Television	7	6	1	0	0	12
Water and Power Development Authority	7	5	2	0	0	10
Multan	7	4	3	0	0	8
Rawalpindi	7	3	4	0	0	6
Lahore Blues	7	2	5	0	0	4
Karachi Whites	7	1	6	0	0	2
Zarai Taraqiati Bank Limited	7	1	6	0	0	2

Team qualified for the Knockout stage

== Group stage ==
=== Pool A ===
==== Round 1 ====
6 September 2018
10:00
Scorecard

Sui Northern Gas Pipelines Limited; 295/8 (50 overs)	v	Lahore Whites; 252/9 (50 overs)
Mohammad Hafeez 82 (80); Qaiser Ashraf 5/43 (10 overs)		Usman Salahuddin 57 (80); Mohammad Imran 3/43 (10 overs)

Sui Northern Gas Pipelines Limited won by 43 runs
Lahore City Cricket Association Ground, Lahore
Umpires: Asif Yaqoob and Mohammad Sajid

- Lahore Whites won the toss and elected to field.
- Asim Ali, Ali Zaryab and Ameer Hamza (Lahore Whites) all made their List A debuts.

6 September 2018
10:00
Scorecard

Peshawar; 79 (31.2 overs)	v	Khan Research Laboratories; 80/2 (19.1 overs)
Ashfaq Ahmed 39 (68); Nauman Ali 5/10 (8.2 overs)		Mohammad Mohsin 51* (44); Taj Wali 1/12 (5 overs)

Khan Research Laboratories won by 8 wickets
Khan Research Laboratory Ground, Rawalpindi
Umpires: Mohammad Asif and Shozab Raza

- Peshawar won the toss and elected to bat.

6 September 2018
10:00
Scorecard

Islamabad; 271/6 (50 overs)	v	Habib Bank Limited; 272/7 (48.4 overs)
Sarmad Bhatti 115 (116); Umar Gul 2/46 (8 overs)		Abid Ali 74 (79); Samiullah Mehsud 3/36 (9 overs)

Habib Bank Limited won by 3 wickets
Diamond Club Ground, Islamabad
Umpires: Nasir Hussain and Rashid Riaz

- Habib Bank Limited won the toss and elected to field.
- Naseerullah, Rohail Nazir, Mohammad Arham, Samiullah Mehsud (Islamabad) and Abbas Afridi (Habib Bank Limited) all made their List A debuts.

6 September 2018
10:00
Scorecard

National Bank of Pakistan; 394/4 (50 overs)	v	Federally Administered Tribal Areas; 323/8 (50 overs)
Rameez Raja 144 (128); Adnan Ghaus 2/75 (9 overs)		Khushdil Shah 110 (112); Ghulam Mudassar 2/30 (6 overs)

National Bank of Pakistan won by 71 runs
Abbottabad Cricket Stadium, Abbottabad
Umpires: Farooq Ali Khan and Saqib Khan

- National Bank of Pakistan won the toss and elected to bat.
- Fazal-ur-Rehman and Manzoor Khan (Federally Administered Tribal Areas) both made their List A debuts.

==== Round 2 ====
13 September 2018
10:00
Scorecard

National Bank of Pakistan; 295/7 (50 overs)	v	Lahore Whites; 111 (29.5 overs)
Rameez Raja 80 (108); Qaiser Ashraf 5/54 (10 overs)		Nauman Anwar 31 (23); Bilal Asif 4/24 (8.5 overs)

National Bank of Pakistan won by 184 runs
Lahore City Cricket Association Ground, Lahore
Umpires: Majid Hussain and Mohammad Sajid

- National Bank of Pakistan won the toss and elected to bat.
- Muhammad Zaid and Bilal Anwar (Lahore Whites) both made their List A debuts.

13 September 2018
10:00
Scorecard

Peshawar; 208/9 (50 overs)	v	Habib Bank Limited; 198 (49 overs)
Ashfaq Ahmed 36 (52); Abdur Rehman 2/28 (10 overs)		Imran Farhat 58 (94); Mohammad Ilyas 3/44 (9 overs)

Peshawar won by 10 runs
Khan Research Laboratory Ground, Rawalpindi
Umpires: Asif Yaqoob and Mohammad Asif

- Peshawar won the toss and elected to bat.
- Mohammad Ilyas (Peshawar) made his List A debut.

13 September 2018
10:00
Scorecard

Islamabad; 290/5 (50 overs)	v	Khan Research Laboratories; 296/8 (49.3 overs)
Faizan Riaz 110 (113); Sadaf Hussain 3/35 (10 overs)		Saif Badar 86 (69); Faizan Riaz 3/53 (9.3 overs)

Khan Research Laboratories won by 2 wickets
Diamond Club Ground, Islamabad
Umpires: Waseemuddin and Nasir Hussain

- Khan Research Laboratories won the toss and elected to field.
- Ali Salman, Ashfaq Ali, Muzammil Shah, Samiullah (Islamabad) and Sohaibullah (Khan Research Laboratories) all made their List A debuts.

13 September 2018
10:00
Scorecard

Federally Administered Tribal Areas; 304/5 (45 overs)	v	Sui Northern Gas Pipelines Limited; 298/8 (45 overs)
Khushdil Shah 122* (114); Mohammad Imran 2/59 (7 overs)		Asad Shafiq 88 (79); Khushdil Shah 3/49 (9 overs)

Federally Administered Tribal Areas won by 6 runs
Abbottabad Cricket Stadium, Abbottabad
Umpires: Saqib Khan and Farooq Ali Khan

- Sui Northern Gas Pipelines Limited won the toss and elected to field.
- Basit Afridi, Zulqarnain (Federally Administered Tribal Areas) and Irfan Elahi (Sui Northern Gas Pipelines Limited) all made their List A debuts.

==== Round 3 ====
22 September 2018
10:00
Scorecard

Habib Bank Limited; 317/9 (47 overs)	v	Lahore Whites; 298/7 (47 overs)
Agha Salman 113 (80); Qaiser Ashraf 4/48 (9 overs)		Nauman Anwar 152 (111); Amad Butt 3/35 (8 overs)

Habib Bank Limited won by 17 runs (D/L method)
Gaddafi Stadium, Lahore
Umpires: Mohammad Sajid and Sultan Mahmood

- Lahore Whites won the toss and elected to field.
- Mohammad Bilal (Habib Bank Limited) and Raja Farzan (Lahore Whites) both made their List A debuts.

22 September 2018
10:00
Scorecard

National Bank of Pakistan; 285/9 (50 overs)	v	Peshawar; 241 (48 overs)
Umar Siddiq 59 (85); Imran Khan 4/58 (10 overs)		Obaid Ibrahim 74 (77); Ghulam Mudassar 5/37 (9 overs)

National Bank won by 44 runs
Iqbal Stadium, Faisalabad
Umpires: Shozab Raza and Waleed Yaqub

- Peshawar won the toss and elected to field.
- Obaid Ibrahim (Peshawar) made his List A debut.

22 September 2018
10:00
Scorecard

Sui Northern Gas Pipelines Limited; 294 (49.4 overs)	v	Islamabad; 295/4 (49.3 overs)
Mohammad Rizwan 59 (71); Mohammad Nadeem 3/51 (9 overs)		Fahad Iqbal 108* (122); Mohammad Hafeez 2/46 (9 overs)

Islamabad won by 6 wickets
Diamond Club Ground, Islamabad
Umpires: Ghaffar Kazmi and Mohammad Asif

- Islamabad won the toss and elected to field.

22 September 2018
10:00
Scorecard

Federally Administered Tribal Areas; 334/8 (50 overs)	v	Khan Research Laboratories; 340/9 (49.3 overs)
Khushdil Shah 100 (107); Saeed Anwar 3/65 (8 overs)		Jaahid Ali 86 (85); Asif Afridi 2/58 (10 overs)

Khan Research Laboratories won by 1 wicket
Abbottabad Cricket Stadium, Abbottabad
Umpires: Saqib Khan and Farooq Ali Khan

- Khan Research Laboratories won the toss and elected to field.

==== Round 4 ====
30 September 2018
10:00
Scorecard

Peshawar; 263/7 (50 overs)	v	Sui Northern Gas Pipelines Limited; 211 (46.2 overs)
Sahibzada Farhan 122 (142); Mohammad Imran		Mohammad Hafeez 38 (46); Mohammad Ilyas 3/42 (8.2 overs)

Peshawar won by 52 runs
Iqbal Stadium, Faisalabad
Umpires: Sultan Mahmood and Mohammad Asif

- Peshawar won the toss and elected to bat.

30 September 2018
10:00
Scorecard

National Bank of Pakistan; 346/2 (50 overs)	v	Islamabad; 120 (30.4 overs)
Umar Siddiq 157* (145); Arsal Sheikh 1/44 (10 overs)		Fahad Iqbal 38* (62); Kamran Ghulam 7/23 (6.4 overs)

National Bank won by 226 runs
Diamond Club Ground, Islamabad
Umpires: Aaley Haider and Imtiaz Iqbal

- Islamabad won the toss and elected to field.

30 September 2018
10:00
Scorecard

Habib Bank Limited; 333 (50 overs)	v	Federally Administered Tribal Areas; 307 (47 overs)
Umar Akmal 92 (85); Khushdil Shah 2/40 (7 overs)		Asad Afridi 59 (52); Abbas Afridi 5/51 (10 overs)

Habib Bank won by 26 runs
Abbottabad Cricket Stadium, Abbottabad
Umpires: Saqib Khan and Farooq Ali Khan

- Federally Administered Tribal Areas won the toss and elected to field.
- Sajjad Ali (Habib Bank Limited) and Saeed Khan (Federally Administered Tribal Areas) both made their List A debuts.

30 September 2018
10:00
Scorecard

Lahore Whites; 165 (47 overs)	v	Khan Research Laboratories; 166/5 (42.1 overs)
Mohammad Imran 45 (56); Sohaibullah 3/23 (8 overs)		Jaahid Ali 50 (66); Haris Bashir 3/36 (10 overs)

Khan Research Laboratories won by 5 wickets
Lahore City Cricket Association Ground, Lahore
Umpires: Khalid Mahmood and Shameem Ansari

- Lahore Whites won the toss and elected to bat.
- Afaq Shahid, Haris Bashir and Wasim Akbar (Lahore Whites) all made their List A debuts.

==== Round 5 ====
8 October 2018
10:00
Scorecard

Peshawar; 231 (49.4 overs)	v	Lahore Whites; 182/9 (50 overs)
Gauhar Ali 63 (48); Waqas Ahmed 2/40 (8 overs)		Afaq Shahid 57 (68); Jibran Khan 3/23 (10 overs)

Peshawar won by 49 runs
Gaddafi Stadium, Lahore
Umpires: Majid Hussain and Sultan Mahmood

- Peshawar won the toss and elected to bat.
- Mohammad Mohsin (Peshawar) made his List A debut.

8 October 2018
10:00
Scorecard

Islamabad; 281/9 (50 overs)	v	Federally Administered Tribal Areas; 186/5 (35.3 overs)
Fahad Iqbal 83 (115); Naseer Akram 3/59 (10 overs)		Fazal-ur-Rehman 60 (78); Arsal Sheikh 2/40 (8 overs)

Islamabad won by 5 runs (D/L method)
Diamond Club Ground, Islamabad
Umpires: Aaley Haider and Zameer Haider

- Federally Administered Tribal Areas won the toss and elected to field.
- Rehmanullah, Abdul Rauf (Federally Administered Tribal Areas) and Farmanullah Khan all made their List A debuts.

8 October 2018
10:00
Scorecard

Sui Northern Gas Pipelines Limited; 352/5 (50 overs)	v	National Bank of Pakistan; 339 (50 overs)
Ali Waqas 102 (122); Ghulam Mudassar 3/85 (10 overs)		Shan Masood 132 (112); Hussain Talat 4/54 (7 overs)

Sui Northern Gas Pipelines Limited won by 13 runs
Iqbal Stadium, Faisalabad
Umpires: Ghaffar Kazmi and Tahir Rasheed

- National Bank of Pakistan won the toss and elected to field.

8 October 2018
10:00
Scorecard

Habib Bank Limited; 320/7 (50 overs)	v	Khan Research Laboratories; 155/1 (28 overs)
Abid Ali 91 (103); Nauman Ali 2/30 (10 overs)		Arsalan Arshad 90* (94); Ashiq Ali 1/40 (5 overs)

Khan Research Laboratories won by 9 runs (D/L method)
Khan Research Laboratory Ground, Rawalpindi
Umpires: Khalid Mahmood and Imtiaz Iqbal

- Khan Research Laboratories won the toss and elected to field.

==== Round 6 ====
16 October 2018
10:00
Scorecard

Federally Administered Tribal Areas; 214 (48.5 overs)	v	Lahore Whites; 215/6 (41.1 overs)
Rehan Afridi 59 (88); Muhammad Zaid Alam 3/29 (9 overs)		Zain-ul-Hasan 57 (80); Abdul Rauf 4/42 (9 overs)

Lahore Whites won by 4 wickets
Lahore City Cricket Association Ground, Lahore
Umpires: Shameem Ansari and Tahir Rasheed

- Federally Administered Tribal Areas won the toss and elected to bat.
- Mohammad Arif (Federally Administered Tribal Areas) made his List A debut.

16 October 2018
10:00
Scorecard

Islamabad; 288/8 (50 overs)	v	Peshawar; 173 (36.3 overs)
Imad Wasim 104 (104); Akmal Khan 3/66 (9 overs)		Nabi Gul 78 (74); Farmanullah Khan 4/12 (4 overs)

Islamabad won by 115 runs
Diamond Club Ground, Islamabad
Umpires: Ghaffar Kazmi and Tahir Shah

- Peshawar won the toss and elected to field.
- Akmal Khan (Peshawar) made his List A debut.

16 October 2018
10:00
Scorecard

Khan Research Laboratories; 252 (49.4 overs)	v	National Bank of Pakistan; 253/4 (46.4 overs)
Shoaib Ahmed 116 (122); Hammad Azam 3/40 (8.4 overs)		Rameez Raja 53 (61); Shoaib Ahmed 3/37 (10 overs)

National Bank of Pakistan won by 6 wickets
Khan Research Laboratory Ground, Rawalpindi
Umpires: Aaley Haider and Abdul Muqeet

- National Bank of Pakistan won the toss and elected to field.

16 October 2018
10:00
Scorecard

Habib Bank Limited; 269/8 (50 overs)	v	Sui Northern Gas Pipelines Limited; 205/6 (40 overs)
Rameez Aziz 43 (66); Bilawal Bhatti 2/44 (9 overs)		Rumman Raees 57* (65); Khurram Shehzad 2/36 (8 overs)

Habib Bank Limited won by 2 runs (D/L method)
Iqbal Stadium, Faisalabad
Umpires: Ahmed Shahab and Nasir Hussain

- Habib Bank Limited won the toss and elected to bat.
- Saad Khan, Khurram Shehzad (Habib Bank Limited) and Muhammad Musa (Sui Northern Gas Pipelines Limited) all made their List A debuts.

==== Round 7 ====
24 October 2018
10:00
Scorecard

Habib Bank Limited; 274 (49.1 overs)	v	National Bank of Pakistan; 251/4 (45 overs)
Umar Akmal 84 (62); Ghulam Mudassar 3/41 (10 overs)		Umar Siddiq 72 (88); Zohaib Khan 3/47 (9 overs)

National Bank of Pakistan won by 23 runs (D/L method)
Iqbal Stadium, Faisalabad
Umpires: Ahmed Shahab and Nasir Hussain

- National Bank of Pakistan won the toss and elected to field.
- Haider Rameez (Habib Bank Limited) made his List A debut.

24 October 2018
10:00
Scorecard

Sui Northern Gas Pipelines Limited; 238 (49.5 overs)	v	Khan Research Laboratories; 207/7 (46 overs)
Khurram Shehzad 49 (64); Nauman Ali 3/40 (10 overs)		Abdul Rehman Muzammil 59 (70); Yasir Shah 3/47 (10 overs)

Sui Northern Gas Pipelines Limited won by 4 runs (D/L method)
Khan Research Laboratory Ground, Rawalpindi
Umpires: Aaley Haider and Ghaffar Kazmi

- Khan Research Laboratories won the toss and elected to field.

24 October 2018
10:00
Scorecard

Islamabad; 316/9 (50 overs)	v	Lahore Whites; 252/9 (50 overs)
Fahad Iqbal 122 (120); Muhammad Zaid Alam 5/34 (8 overs)		Mohammad Imran 66 (77); Fahad Iqbal 5/42 (10 overs)

Islamabad won by 64 runs
Gaddafi Stadium, Lahore
Umpires: Shameem Ansari and Imtiaz Iqbal

- Lahore Whites won the toss and elected to field.

24 October 2018
10:00
Scorecard

Federally Administered Tribal Areas; 253 (45 overs)	v	Peshawar; 247 (38.3 overs)
Asif Afridi 74 (55); Taj Wali 5/49 (8 overs)		Gauhar Ali 69 (55); Hayatullah 3/35 (10 overs)

Federally Administered Tribal Areas won by 6 runs
Abbottabad Cricket Stadium, Abbottabad
Umpires: Abdul Muqeet and Tahir Shah

- Federally Administered Tribal Areas won the toss and elected to bat.

=== Pool B ===
==== Round 1 ====
6 September 2018
10:00
Scorecard

Lahore Blues; 307/6 (50 overs)	v	Zarai Taraqiati Bank Limited; 222 (45.2 overs)
Bilal Irshad 67 (59); Salahuddin 2/39 (10 overs)		Anas Mustafa 51* (52); Zafar Gohar 3/26 (9.2 overs)

Lahore Blues won by 85 runs
Iqbal Stadium, Faisalabad
Umpires: Imran Javed and Faisal Afridi

- Lahore Blues won the toss and elected to bat.
- Mohammad Rameez, Mohammad Umar (Lahore Blues), Ali Nasir, Anas Mustafa, Salahuddin, Haris Majeed, Mohammad Umair and Zeeshan Ahmed (Zarai Taraqiati Bank Limited) all made their List A debuts.

6 September 2018
10:00
Scorecard

Karachi Whites; 163 (40.4 overs)	v	Water and Power Development Authority; 164/3 (45.1 overs)
Asad Baig 47 (66); Khalid Usman 5/32 (9.4 overs)		Mohammad Saad 57* (100); Mohammad Umar 1/33 (8 overs)

Water and Power Development Authority won by 7 wickets
National Stadium, Karachi
Umpires: Qaiser Waheed and Tariq Rasheed

- Water and Power Development Authority won the toss and elected to field.
- Kashif Iqbal, Waleed Ahmed and Mohammad Umar (Karachi Whites) all made their List A debuts.

6 September 2018
10:00
Scorecard

Rawalpindi; 167 (48.5 overs)	v	Sui Southern Gas Company; 170/4 (24.2 overs)
Abdul Samad 49 (86); Kashif Bhatti 3/29 (10 overs)		Awais Zia 44 (25); Asif Ali 2/33 (9 overs)

Sui Southern Gas Company won by 6 wickets
Pindi Club Ground, Rawalpindi
Umpires: Ahmed Shahab and Abdul Muqeet

- Sui Southern Gas Company won the toss and elected to field.
- Nadeem Sikander, Kashif Ali and Mohammad Ismail (Rawalpindi) all made their List A debuts.

6 September 2018
10:00
Scorecard

Multan; 138 (38.2 overs)	v	Pakistan Television; 140/2 (29.4 overs)
Waqar Hussain 40 (54); Raza Hasan 3/14 (8.2 overs)		Ali Imran 64 (79); Asif Fawad 1/28 (8 overs)

Pakistan Television won by 8 wickets
Multan Cricket Stadium, Multan
Umpires: Tahir Shah and Zameer Haider

- Pakistan Television won the toss and elected to field.
- Imran Rafiq, Ahmar Ashfaq, Hasnain Bokhari, Saddam Afridi (Multan) and Azam Khan (Pakistan Television) all made their List A debuts.

==== Round 2 ====
13 September 2018
10:00
Scorecard

Zarai Taraqiati Bank Limited; 251 (49.1 overs)	v	Rawalpindi; 224 (48.3 overs)
Shakeel Ansar 55 (54); Mukhtar Ahmed 3/40 (9.1 overs)		Mukhtar Ahmed 47 (49); Munir-ur-Rehman 3/36 (9 overs)

Zarai Taraqiati Bank Limited won by 27 runs
Pindi Club Ground, Rawalpindi
Umpires: Abdul Muqeet and Rashid Riaz

- Rawalpindi won the toss and elected to field.
- Aqib Javed and Aqib Shah (Zarai Taraqiati Bank Limited) both made their List A debuts.

13 September 2018
10:00
Scorecard

Water and Power Development Authority; 313/5 (50 overs)	v	Multan; 259 (47 overs)
Bismillah Khan 78 (92); Saddam Afridi 2/60 (10 overs)		Saif-ur-Rehman 72 (90); Sadaif Mehdi 3/41 (7 overs)

Water and Power Development Authority won by 54 runs
Multan Cricket Stadium, Multan
Umpires: Tahir Shah and Zameer Haider

- Multan won the toss and elected to field.
- Saif-ur-Rehman and Ghulam Rehman (Multan) both made their List A debuts.

13 September 2018
10:00
Scorecard

Lahore Blues; 180 (38.2 overs)	v	Pakistan Television; 181/3 (34 overs)
Hamza Nazar 32 (35); Mohammad Irfan 4/44 (9.2 overs)		Saud Shakeel 82* (104); Mohammad Rameez 2/32 (9 overs)

Pakistan Television won by 7 wickets
Iqbal Stadium, Faisalabad
Umpires: Imran Javed and Faisal Afridi

- Lahore Blues won the toss and elected to bat.
- Zubair Malik and Asadullah (Lahore Blues) both made their List A debuts.

13 September 2018
10:00
Scorecard

Sui Southern Gas Company; 275/8 (50 overs)	v	Karachi Whites; 216/6 (50 overs)
Umar Amin 97 (114); Waleed Ahmed 2/35 (10 overs)		Anwar Ali 63 (62); Kashif Bhatti 4/37 (10 overs)

Sui Southern Gas Company won by 59 runs
National Stadium, Karachi
Umpires: Qaiser Waheed and Tariq Rasheed

- Karachi Whites won the toss and elected to field.
- Omair Yousuf and Ismail Khan (Karachi Whites) both made their List A debuts.

==== Round 3 ====
22 September 2018
10:00
Scorecard

Zarai Taraqiati Bank Limited; 200 (47.1 overs)	v	Karachi Whites; 201/6 (47.1 overs)
Aun Abbas 69 (86); Waleed Ahmed 6/28 (8.1 overs)		Omair Yousuf 45 (74); Usman Ashraf 3/39 (9.1 overs)

Karachi Whites won by 4 wickets
National Stadium, Karachi
Umpires: Qaiser Waheed and Tariq Rasheed

- Zarai Taraqiati Bank Limited won the toss and elected to bat.
- Tauseeq Ahmed (Karachi Whites) made his List A debut.

22 September 2018
10:00
Scorecard

Rawalpindi; 262/9 (50 overs)	v	Pakistan Television; 263/2 (44.5 overs)
Tayyab Riaz 84 (99); Aamer Jamal 3/51 (8 overs)		Saud Shakeel 100* (110); Asif Ali 1/34 (9 overs)

Pakistan Television won by 8 wickets
Pindi Club Ground, Rawalpindi
Umpires: Ahmed Shahab and Rashid Riaz

- Pakistan Television won the toss and elected to field.
- Aamer Jamal (Pakistan Television) made his List A debut.

22 September 2018
10:00
Scorecard

Sui Southern Gas Company; 265/8 (50 overs)	v	Multan; 133/9 (50 overs)
Sami Aslam 76 (104); Mohammad Asif 3/64 (9 overs)		Yousaf Babar 60* (143); Kashif Bhatti 4/15 (10 overs)

Sui Southern Gas Company won by 132 runs
Multan Cricket Stadium, Multan
Umpires: Zameer Haider and Adnan Rasheed

- Multan won the toss and elected to field.
- Yousaf Babar (Multan) and Ammad Alam (Sui Southern Gas Company) both made their List A debuts.

22 September 2018
10:00
Scorecard

Water and Power Development Authority; 257/8 (45 overs)	v	Lahore Blues; 195/5 (45 overs)
Muhammad Akhlaq 88 (116); Aizaz Cheema 3/46 (8 overs)		Mohammad Waleed 44* (53); Khalid Usman 3/28 (9 overs)

Water and Power Development Authority won by 62 runs
Lahore City Cricket Association Ground, Lahore
Umpires: Majid Hussain and Faisal Afridi

- Water and Power Development Authority won the toss and elected to bat.
- Mohammad Ilyas, Ahmed Akram and Zia Shahzad (Lahore Blues) all made their List A debuts.

==== Round 4 ====
30 September 2018
10:00
Scorecard

Karachi Whites; 267/8 (50 overs)	v	Pakistan Television; 268/4 (47 overs)
Kashif Iqbal 68 (68); Raza Hasan 2/44 (10 overs)		Ali Imran 101 (111); Waleed Ahmed 2/41 (10 overs)

Pakistan Televisionwon by 6 wickets
National Stadium, Karachi
Umpires: Qaiser Waheed and Farooq Ali Khan

- Pakistan Television won the toss and elected to field.
- Israr Ahmed (Karachi Whites) made his List A debut.

30 September 2018
10:00
Scorecard

Rawalpindi; 262/9 (50 overs)	v	Water and Power Development Authority; 162 (35.4 overs)
Zeeshan Malik 145 (145); Ehsan Adil 3/50 (10 overs)		Salman Butt 59 (50); Awais Iqbal 5/26 (9 overs)

Rawalpindi won by 100 runs
Pindi Club Ground, Rawalpindi
Umpires: Tahir Rasheed and Waleed Yaqub

- Water and Power Development Authority won the toss and elected to field.
- Awais Iqbal and Saeed-ur-Rehman (Rawalpindi) both made their List A debuts.

30 September 2018
10:00
Scorecard

Zarai Taraqiati Bank Limited; 253/7 (50 overs)	v	Multan; 256/3 (45.3 overs)
Shakeel Ansar 100 (107); Hasnain Bokhari 3/42 (10 overs)		Zeeshan Ashraf 85 (82); Imran Khan 1/23 (7 overs)

Multan won by 7 wickets
Multan Cricket Stadium, Multan
Umpires: Riazuddin and Adnan Rasheed

- Multan won the toss and elected to field.
- Yousuf Babar, Shoaib Bilal (Multan) and Shahrukh Ali (Zarai Taraqiati Bank Limited) all made their List A debuts.

30 September 2018
10:00
Scorecard

Lahore Blues; 200 (46.3 overs)	v	Sui Southern Gas Company; 204/2 (38.4 overs)
Saad Nasim 57 (68); Adil Amin 2/14 (4.3 overs)		Awais Zia 55 (57); Saad Nasim 1/38 (8 overs)

Sui Southern Gas Company won by 8 wickets
Gaddafi Stadium, Lahore
Umpires: Mohammad Sajid and Aslam Bareach

- Lahore Blues won the toss and elected to bat.
- Hasan Qadeer (Lahore Blues) made his List A debut.

==== Round 5 ====
8 October 2018
10:00
Scorecard

Pakistan Television; 237 (48.4 overs)	v	Sui Southern Gas Company; 238/3 (37.5 overs)
Saud Shakeel 54 (75); Usman Khan 3/39 (9.4 overs)		Awais Zia 108* (100); Abdul Razzaq 1/18 (5 overs)

Sui Southern Gas Company won by 7 wickets
Marghzar Cricket Ground, Islamabad
Umpires: Asif Yaqoob and Shameem Ansari

- Sui Southern Gas Corporation won the toss and elected to field.

8 October 2018
10:00
Scorecard

Zarai Taraqiati Bank Limited; 263 (49.4 overs)	v	Water and Power Development Authority; 189/5 (38 overs)
Shahrukh Ali 52 (66); Mansoor Amjad 3/44 (10 overs)		Salman Butt 97 (114); Mohammad Ali 2/31 (8 overs)

Water and Power Development Authority won by 5 runs (D/L method)
Rawalpindi Cricket Stadium, Rawalpindi
Umpires: Aslam Bareach and Waleed Yaqub

- Zarai Taraqiati Bank Limited won the toss and elected to bat.
- Mohammad Ali (Zarai Taraqiati Bank Limited) made his List A debut.

8 October 2018
10:00
Scorecard

Karachi Whites; 274 (50 overs)	v	Rawalpindi; 275/3 (40.2 overs)
Kashif Iqbal 77 (75); Saad Altaf 3/50 (9 overs)		Mukhtar Ahmed 161 (107); Anwar Ali 1/14 (5 overs)

Rawalpindi won by 7 wickets
National Stadium, Karachi
Umpires: Qaiser Waheed and Farooq Ali Khan

- Rawalpindi won the toss and elected to field.

8 October 2018
10:00
Scorecard

Lahore Blues; 195 (44.2 overs)	v	Multan; 196/2 (32 overs)
Fahad-ul-Haq 55 (53); Shoaib Bilal 2/25 (7 overs)		Zeeshan Ashraf 73 (60); Aizaz Cheema 1/13 (5 overs)

Multan won by 8 wickets
Multan Cricket Stadium, Multan
Umpires: Waseemuddin and Riazuddin

- Multan won the toss and elected to field.
- Zia Mohammad Shehzad (Lahore Blues) made his List A debut.

==== Round 6 ====
16 October 2018
10:00
Scorecard

Rawalpindi; 279/6 (50 overs)	v	Lahore Blues; 250 (49.4 overs)
Zeeshan Malik 149 (143); Saad Nasim 2/50 (10 overs)		Saad Nasim 51 (64); Mohammad Ismail 4/50 (9.4 overs)

Rawalpindi won by 29 runs
Gaddafi Stadium, Lahore
Umpires: Sultan Mahmood and Khalid Mahmood

- Rawalpindi won the toss and elected to bat.

16 October 2018
10:00
Scorecard

Pakistan Television; 304/7 (50 overs)	v	Zarai Taraqiati Bank Limited; 209 (45 overs)
Saud Shakeel 104 (107); Raza Ali Dar 2/38 (10 overs)		Shakeel Ansar 53 (69); Mohammad Irfan 4/36 (9 overs)

Pakistan Television won by 95 runs
Rawalpindi Cricket Stadium, Rawalpindi
Umpires: Aslam Bareach and Riazuddin

- Zarai Taraqiati Bank Limited won the toss and elected to field.
- Naseem Shah (Zarai Taraqiati Bank Limited) made his List A debut.

16 October 2018
10:00
Scorecard

Sui Southern Gas Company; 391/7 (50 overs)	v	Water and Power Development Authority; 292/3 (39 overs)
Sami Aslam 114 (109); Sadaif Mehdi 3/78 (10 overs)		Salman Butt 121* (89); Usman Khan 1/42 (9 overs)

Water and Power Development Authority won by 11 runs (D/L method)
Marghzar Cricket Ground, Islamabad
Umpires: Imtiaz Iqbal and Adnan Rasheed

- Water and Power Development Authority won the toss and elected to field.
- Taimur Sultan and Arshad Iqbal (Water and Power Development Authority) both made their List A debuts.

16 October 2018
10:00
Scorecard

Multan; 223/9 (50 overs)	v	Karachi Whites; 220 (44.1 overs)
Imran Rafiq 85 (117); Faraz Ahmed 2/42 (10 overs)		Saad Ali 82 (84); Ghulam Rehman 3/51 (10 overs)

Multan won by 3 runs
Multan Cricket Stadium, Multan
Umpires: Waseemuddin and Waleed Yaqub

- Karachi Whites won the toss and elected to field.

==== Round 7 ====
24 October 2018
10:00
Scorecard

Lahore Blues; 279/5 (50 overs)	v	Karachi Whites; 242 (46 overs)
Saad Nasim 100* (99); Israr Ahmed 2/58 (10 overs)		Saad Ali 81 (77); Hamza Nazar 2/38 (6 overs)

Lahore Blues won by 37 runs
Lahore City Cricket Association Ground, Lahore
Umpires: Majid Hussain and Waseemuddin

- Karachi Whites won the toss and elected to field.
- Moazzam Malik (Karachi Whites) made his List A debut.

24 October 2018
10:00
Scorecard

Rawalpindi; 372/9 (50 overs)	v	Multan; 314/4 (41.1 overs)
Mukhtar Ahmed 155 (130); Ali Usman 2/55 (10 overs)		Zeeshan Ashraf 166* (115); Mohammad Nawaz 2/55 (10 overs)

Multan won by 29 runs (D/L method)
Pindi Club Ground, Rawalpindi
Umpires: Aslam Bareach and Adnan Rashid

- Rawalpindi won the toss and elected to bat.
- Ali Hasnain (Multan) made his List A debut.

24 October 2018
10:00
Scorecard

Pakistan Television; 307/5 (50 overs)	v	Water and Power Development Authority; 231 (41 overs)
Nihal Mansoor 133* (130); Zahid Mansoor 2/43 (10 overs)		Muhammad Akhlaq 77 (94); Ali Imran 4/30 (6 overs)

Pakistan Television won by 76 runs
Marghzar Cricket Ground, Islamabad
Umpires: Farooq Ali Khan and Riazuddin

- Water and Power Development Authority won the toss and elected to field.

24 October 2018
10:00
Scorecard

Zarai Taraqiati Bank Limited; 141 (32.4 overs)	v	Sui Southern Gas Company; 142/5 (21.1 overs)
Ali Nasir 23 (42); Usama Mir 4/44 (10 overs)		Awais Zia 62 (62); Mohammad Ali 2/52 (10 overs)

Sui Southern Gas Company won by 5 wickets
Diamond Club Ground, Islamabad
Umpires: Khalid Mahmood and Tahir Rasheed

- Sui Southern Gas Corporation won the toss and elected to field.
- Mansoor Ali (Zarai Taraqiati Bank Limited) and Waqas Ali (Sui Southern Gas Company) both made their List A debuts.

== Knockout stage ==
=== Quarter-finals ===
1st quarter-final
27 October 2018
10:00
Scorecard

National Bank of Pakistan; 203 (43 overs)	v	Water and Power Development Authority; 207/2 (43.2 overs)
Umar Siddiq 61 (72); Wahab Riaz 4/31 (8 overs)		Salman Butt 70* (85); Hammad Azam 1/20 (4 overs)

Water and Power Development Authority won by 8 wickets
Gaddafi Stadium, Lahore
Umpires: Ghaffar Kazmi and Riazuddin

- Water and Power Development Authority won the toss and elected to field.

2nd quarter-final
28 October 2018
10:00
Scorecard

Habib Bank Limited; 320/8 (50 overs)	v	Sui Southern Gas Company; 154 (34 overs)
Jamal Anwar 119 (124); Sohail Khan 3/76 (10 overs)		Fawad Alam 59 (60); Amad Butt 4/42 (7 overs)

Habib Bank Limited won by 166 runs
Gaddafi Stadium, Lahore
Umpires: Tahir Shah and Nasir Hussain

- Sui Southern Gas Corporation won the toss and elected to field.

3rd quarter-final
29 October 2018
10:00
Scorecard

Multan; 261/8 (50 overs)	v	Khan Research Laboratories; 262/4 (46.5 overs)
Imran Rafiq 70 (100); Shoaib Ahmed 2/39 (10 overs)		Shoaib Ahmed 92 (83); Ghulam Rehman 3/46 (10 overs)

Khan Research Laboratories won by 6 wickets
Gaddafi Stadium, Lahore
Umpires: Qaiser Waheed and Mohammad Sajid

- Khan Research Laboratories won the toss and elected to field.

4th quarter-final
30 October 2018
10:00
Scorecard

Pakistan Television; 329/6 (50 overs)	v	Islamabad; 320/7 (50 overs)
Mohammad Waqas 108 (110); Hamza Nadeem 2/57 (9 overs)		Rohail Nazir 100 (100); Abdul Razzaq 2/30 (4 overs)

Pakistan Television won by 9 runs
Gaddafi Stadium, Lahore
Umpires: Ahmed Shahab and Imran Javed

- Islamabad won the toss and elected to field.

=== Semi-finals and final ===
1st Semi-final
1 November 2018
10:00
Scorecard

Khan Research Laboratories; 164 (43.2 overs)	v	Water and Power Development Authority; 166/5 (37.1 overs)
Mohammad Mohsin 48 (60); Ehsan Adil 3/29 (7.2 overs)		Ayaz Tasawwar 50 (82); Sadaf Hussain 2/34 (8 overs)

Water and Power Development Authority won by 5 wickets
Gaddafi Stadium, Lahore
Umpires: Ahmed Shahab and Qaiser Waheed

- Water and Power Development Authority won the toss and elected to field.

1st Semi-final
2 November 2018
10:00
Scorecard

Habib Bank Limited; 321/8 (50 overs)	v	Pakistan Television; 314 (49.4 overs)
Jamal Anwar 88 (111); Mohammad Irfan 2/50 (10 overs)		Ali Imran 102 (65); Amad Butt 2/51 (9.4 overs)

Habib Bank Limited won by 7 runs
Gaddafi Stadium, Lahore
Umpires: Ahmed Shahab and Zameer Haider

- Habib Bank Limited won the toss and elected to bat.

Final
4 November 2018
10:00
Scorecard

Habib Bank Limited; 291/7 (50 overs)	v	Water and Power Development Authority; 229 (44.4 overs)
Zohaib Khan 68* (57); Arshad Iqbal 2/48 (6 overs)		Salman Butt 56 (80); Amad Butt 3/49 (8.4 overs)

Habib Bank Limited won by 62 runs
Gaddafi Stadium, Lahore
Umpires: Ahmed Shahab and Zameer Haider
Player of the match: Zohaib Khan (Habib Bank Limited)

- Water and Power Development Authority won the toss and elected to field.
