= 2018–19 National T20 Cup =

Cricket tournament

- Dates: 10 – 25 December 2018
- Administrator: Pakistan Cricket Board
- Cricket format: Twenty20
- Tournament format(s): Round-robin and final
- Host: Pakistan
- Champions: Lahore Whites (1st title)
- Participants: 8
- Matches: 31
- Most runs: Khurram Manzoor (322)
- Most wickets: Amad Butt (16); Umaid Asif (16)
- Official website: www.pcb.com.pk

The 2018–19 National T20 Cup was a Twenty20 domestic cricket competition that was played in Pakistan. It was the fifteenth season of the National T20 Cup in Pakistan, and was held from 10 to 25 December 2018 in Multan. Eight teams took part, with the top four progressing to the semi-finals. Lahore Blues were the defending champions.

Following the conclusion of the group stage, Rawalpindi, Karachi Whites, Lahore Whites and Islamabad had all progressed to the semi-finals. In the first semi-final, Rawalpindi beat Karachi Whites by six runs to progress to the final. They were joined in the final by Lahore Whites, who beat Islamabad by 88 runs in the second semi-final. In the final, Lahore Whites beat Rawalpindi by two wickets.

== Squads ==
Ahead of the tournament, the following players were selected. Each team picked 18 players, including two emerging players.

FATA	Islamabad	Karachi Whites	Lahore Blues	Lahore Whites	Multan	Peshawar	Rawalpindi
Usman Khan Shinwari (c); Shaheen Shah Afridi; Khushdil Shah; Asif Afridi; Sohail Akhtar; Mukhtar Ahmed; Adil Amin; Kashif Bhatti; Sameen Gul; Usama Mir; Mohammad Saad; Nasir Ahmed; Asad Afridi; Samiullah; Bismillah Khan; Abbas Afridi; Rehan Afridi; Fazal-ur-Rehman	Imad Wasim (c); Shan Masood; Umar Gul; Rohail Nazir; Iftikhar Ahmed; Asif Ali; Junaid Khan; Abid Ali; Sohail Khan; Nauman Ali; Faizan Riaz; Ali Sarfraz; Sarmad Bhatti; Ibtisam Sheikh; Arsal Sheikh; Shehzad Azam; Ahmed Bashir; Rizwan Ali	Anwar Ali (c); Mohammad Asghar; Mohammad Sami; Khurram Manzoor; Shoaib Malik; Rameez Raja; Awais Zia; Danish Aziz; Mohammad Hasan; Fawad Alam; Raza Hasan; Arshad Iqbal; Tabish Khan; Akbar-ur-Rehman; Rahat Ali; Ahsan Ali; Fahad Iqbal; Saim Ayub	Saad Nasim (c); Aizaz Cheema; Waqas Ahmed; Hussain Talat; Nauman Anwar; Agha Salman; Ehsan Adil; Raza Ali Dar; Mohammad Irfan; Zaid Alam; Rizwan Hussain; Imran Butt; Adnan Akmal; Bilal Khan; Bilawal Iqbal; Zain Abbas; Jahid Ali; Salman Fayyaz	Kamran Akmal (c); Salman Butt; Umar Akmal; Wahab Riaz; Umaid Asif; Zafar Gohar; Amad Butt; Hassan Khan; Zeeshan Ashraf; Saif Badar; Tayyab Tahir; Naseem Shah; Kamran Ghulam; Umar Siddiq; Mansoor Amjad; Ali Khan; Ali Shafiq; Ali Zaryab	Sohaib Maqsood (c); Mohammad Irfan; Zulfiqar Babar; Aamer Yamin; Mohammad Hafeez; Zeeshan Malik; Bilawal Bhatti; Mohammad Mohsin; Mohammad Irfan; Imran Farhat; Mohammad Imran; Gulraiz Sadaf; Ali Usman; Hasan Mohsin; Imran Rafiq; Hasnain Bokhari; Sadaif Mehdi; Waqar Hussain	Mohammad Rizwan (c); Imran Khan; Israrullah; Sahibzada Farhan; Fakhar Zaman; Zohaib Khan; Taj Wali; Ali Imran; Saad Ali; Waqas Maqsood; Nabi Gul; Mohammad Waqas; Gohar Ali; Sajid Khan; Mohammad Ilyas; Imran Khan; Raees Ahmed; Suleman Shafqat	Mohammad Amir (c); Sohail Tanvir; Mohammad Nawaz; Shadab Khan; Umar Amin; Fahim Ashraf; Saud Shakeel; Sami Aslam; Khalid Usman; Hammad Azam; Umair Masood; Naved Malik; Zahid Mansoor; Nasir Nawaz; Yasir Ali; Jamal Anwar; Nihal Mansoor; Haider Ali

== Points table ==
Team	Pld	W	L	NR	NRR	Pts
Rawalpindi	7	5	2	0	+0.255	10
Lahore Whites	7	4	3	0	+0.413	8
Karachi Whites	7	4	3	0	+0.256	8
Islamabad	7	3	4	0	+0.140	6
Multan	7	3	4	0	–0.087	6
Federally Administered Tribal Areas	7	3	4	0	–0.173	6
Lahore Blues	7	3	4	0	–0.374	6
Peshawar	7	3	4	0	–0.506	6

Team qualified for the Semi-finals

== Fixtures ==
The Pakistan Cricket Board (PCB) confirmed the fixtures for the tournament in December 2018.

=== Round-robin ===
10 December 2018
Scorecard

Rawalpindi; 154/4 (20 overs)	v	Islamabad; 148/7 (20 overs)
Sami Aslam 55 (47); Imad Wasim 1/21 (4 overs)		Sohail Khan 39 (18); Asif Ali 2/14 (3 overs)

Rawalpindi won by 6 runs
Multan Cricket Stadium, Multan
Umpires: Tahir Shah and Mohammad Asif

- Islamabad won the toss and elected to field.
- Haider Ali and Sohaibullah (Rawalpindi) both made their T20 debuts.

10 December 2018
Scorecard

Lahore Blues; 139/9 (20 overs)	v	Lahore Whites; 141/4 (18.5 overs)
Rizwan Hussain 55 (34); Amad Butt 3/18 (4 overs)		Salman Butt 47 (40); Ehsan Adil 2/41 (3.5 overs)

Lahore Whites won by 6 wickets
Multan Cricket Stadium, Multan
Umpires: Imran Javed and Mohammad Asif

- Lahore Whites won the toss and elected to field.
- Rizwan Hussain and Muhammad Zaid (Lahore Blues) both made their T20 debuts.

11 December 2018
Scorecard

FATA; 124/5 (20 overs)	v	Peshawar; 125/8 (19.5 overs)
Adil Amin 44* (44); Imran Khan 1/23 (4 overs); Waqas Maqsood 1/23 (4 overs)		Nabi Gul 34 (22); Zia-ul-Haq 3/32 (3.5 overs)

Peshawar won by 2 wickets
Multan Cricket Stadium, Multan
Umpires: Imran Javed and Mohammad Asif

- Federally Administered Tribal Areas won the toss and elected to bat.
- Mohammad Mohsin, Raees Ahmed, Sajid Khan (Peshawar) and Samiullah (FATA) all made their T20 debuts.

11 December 2018
Scorecard

Karachi Whites; 163/7 (20 overs)	v	Multan; 166/2 (18.2 overs)
Khurram Manzoor 62 (44); Mohammad Irfan 2/23 (4 overs)		Sohaib Maqsood 88* (57); Raza Hasan 1/17 (4 overs)

Multan won by 8 wickets
Multan Cricket Stadium, Multan
Umpires: Saqib Khan and Tahir Shah

- Karachi Whites won the toss and elected to bat.
- Nadir Shah (Karachi Whites), Mohammad Irfan, Mohammad Mohsin, Hasan Mohsin and Mohammad Imran (Multan) all made their T20 debuts.

12 December 2018
Scorecard

Rawalpindi; 117/8 (20 overs)	v	Lahore Blues; 121/5 (19.1 overs)
Nasir Nawaz 32 (26); Saad Nasim 3/21 (4 overs)		Agha Salman 38* (35); Zahid Mansoor 2/21 (4 overs)

Lahore Blues won by 5 wickets
Multan Cricket Stadium, Multan
Umpires: Farooq Ali Khan and Riazuddin

- Lahore Blues won the toss and elected to field.

12 December 2018
Scorecard

Lahore Whites; 167/4 (20 overs)	v	Islamabad; 145/8 (20 overs)
Salman Butt 63 (49); Adeel Malik 1/24 (3 overs)		Abid Ali 30 (20); Bilal Asif 3/24 (4 overs)

Lahore Whites won by 22 runs
Multan Cricket Stadium, Multan
Umpires: Saqib Khan and Faisal Afridi

- Lahore Whites won the toss and elected to bat.

13 December 2018
Scorecard

Karachi Whites; 130/7 (20 overs)	v	FATA; 123/6 (20 overs)
Khurram Manzoor 79 (63); Mohammad Irfan 4/33 (4 overs)		Mukhtar Ahmed 52 (45); Fawad Alam 2/18 (4 overs)

Karachi Whites won by 7 runs
Multan Cricket Stadium, Multan
Umpires: Tariq Rasheed and Faisal Afridi

- Federally Administered Tribal Areas won the toss and elected to field.
- Arshad Iqbal (Karachi Whites) made his T20 debut.

13 December 2018
Scorecard

Peshawar; 132/6 (20 overs)	v	Multan; 133/5 (18.5 overs)
Fawad Khan 40 (30); Mohammad Irfan 2/34 (4 overs)		Hasan Raza 67* (54); Mohammad Junaid 3/31 (4 overs)

Multan won by 5 wickets
Multan Cricket Stadium, Multan
Umpires: Shozab Raza and Riazuddin

- Multan won the toss and elected to field.
- Mohammad Junaid (Peshawar) made his T20 debut.

14 December 2018
Scorecard

Lahore Whites; 105/8 (15 overs)	v	Rawalpindi; 106/4 (14.4 overs)
Salman Butt 25 (22); Khalid Usman 2/13 (2 overs)		Hammad Azam 30* (20); Bilal Asif 2/17 (3 overs)

Rawalpindi won by 6 wickets
Multan Cricket Stadium, Multan
Umpires: Saqib Khan and Shameem Ansari

- Rawalpindi won the toss and elected to field.
- The match was reduced to 15 overs per side due to rain.
- Sadaf Hussain (Rawalpindi) made his T20 debut.

14 December 2018
Scorecard

Islamabad; 159/7 (20 overs)	v	Lahore Blues; 135 (19.5 overs)
Imad Wasim 64 (42); Aizaz Cheema 2/24 (4 overs)		Rizwan Hussain 72 (54); Umar Gul 3/22 (4 overs)

Islamabad won by 24 runs
Multan Cricket Stadium, Multan
Umpires: Khalid Mahmood and Riazuddin

- Islamabad won the toss and elected to bat.

15 December 2018
Scorecard

Multan; 136/9 (20 overs)	v	FATA; 140/5 (19.2 overs)
Mohammad Mohsin 56 (32); Mohammad Irfan 5/17 (3 overs)		Samiullah 58 (49); Zulfiqar Babar 2/21 (4 overs)

FATA won by 5 wickets
Multan Cricket Stadium, Multan
Umpires: Mohammad Sajid and Tariq Rasheed

- Multan won the toss and elected to bat.
- Ali Usman (Multan) and Fazal-ur-Rehman (FATA) both made their T20 debuts.

15 December 2018
Scorecard

Karachi Whites; 161/3 (20 overs)	v	Peshawar; 140 (20 overs)
Shoaib Malik 71* (41); Mohammad Junaid 1/24 (4 overs)		Fawad Khan 42 (25); Arshad Iqbal 3/17 (4 overs)

Karachi Whites won by 21 runs
Multan Cricket Stadium, Multan
Umpires: Shozab Raza and Tariq Rasheed

- Peshawar won the toss and elected to field.

16 December 2018
Scorecard

Karachi Whites; 145/6 (20 overs)	v	Lahore Whites; 139/9 (20 overs)
Khurram Manzoor 53 (39); Amad Butt 3/19 (4 overs)		Wahab Riaz 32* (25); Shoaib Malik 2/24 (4 overs)

Karachi Whites won by 6 runs
Multan Cricket Stadium, Multan
Umpires: Saqib Khan and Asif Yaqoob

- Lahore Whites won the toss and elected to field.

16 December 2018
Scorecard

Lahore Blues; 129/7 (20 overs)	v	Multan; 133/3 (19.3 overs)
Hasan Raza 46 (53); Saad Nasim 2/20 (4 overs)		Rizwan Hussain 58 (41); Mohammad Irfan 1/20 (4 overs)

Lahore Blues won by 7 wickets
Multan Cricket Stadium, Multan
Umpires: Aaley Haider and Tahir Rasheed

- Multan won the toss and elected to bat.
- Waqar Hussain (Multan) made his T20 debut.

17 December 2018
Scorecard

Islamabad; 135/7 (20 overs)	v	Peshawar; 136/7 (20 overs)
Abid Ali 47 (38); Sajid Khan 2/25 (3 overs)		Mohammad Waqas 41* (26); Ahmed Bashir 3/30 (4 overs)

Peshawar won by 3 wickets
Multan Cricket Stadium, Multan
Umpires: Aaley Haider and Qaiser Waheed

- Peshawar won the toss and elected to field.

17 December 2018
Scorecard

Rawalpindi; 139/9 (20 overs)	v	FATA; 141/4 (19 overs)
Sami Aslam 37 (36); Adil Amin 3/14 (4 overs)		Khushdil Shah 65 (40); Hammad Azam 2/22 (3 overs)

FATA won by 6 wickets
Multan Cricket Stadium, Multan
Umpires: Khalid Mahmood and Nasir Hussain

- Rawalpindi won the toss and elected to bat.

18 December 2018
Scorecard

Lahore Whites; 109/7 (20 overs)	v	Multan; 113/3 (17.2 overs)
Ali Khan 43* (36); Mohammad Irfan 2/17 (4 overs)		Mohammad Hafeez 46* (38); Umaid Asif 1/15 (3 overs)

Multan won by 7 wickets
Multan Cricket Stadium, Multan
Umpires: Asif Yaqoob and Imtiaz Iqbal

- Lahore Whites won the toss and elected to bat.

18 December 2018
Scorecard

Karachi Whites; 179/6 (20 overs)	v	Lahore Blues; 141 (18.4 overs)
Awais Zia 68 (43); Mohammad Irfan 2/31 (4 overs); Hussain Talat 2/31 (4 overs)		Rizwan Hussain 45 (40); Mohammad Sami 5/14 (3.4 overs)

Karachi Whites won by 38 runs
Multan Cricket Stadium, Multan
Umpires: Mohammad Sajid and Waseemuddin

- Lahore Blues won the toss and elected to field.

19 December 2018
Scorecard

FATA; 146/7 (20 overs)	v	Islamabad; 143/8 (20 overs)
Kashif Bhatti 34* (12); Ahmed Bashir 2/18 (3 overs)		Iftikhar Ahmed 32* (38); Mohammad Irfan 3/24 (4 overs)

FATA won by 3 runs
Multan Cricket Stadium, Multan
Umpires: Abdul Muqeet and Ahmed Shahab

- Islamabad won the toss and elected to field.

19 December 2018
Scorecard

Peshawar; 153/4 (20 overs)	v	Rawalpindi; 157/6 (19.4 overs)
Saad Ali 46* (38); Abdur Rehman 1/17 (4 overs)		Mohammad Nawaz 37* (30); Mohammad Mohsin 2/25 (4 overs)

Rawalpindi won by 4 wickets
Multan Cricket Stadium, Multan
Umpires: Qaiser Waheed and Waleed Yaqub

- Rawalpindi won the toss and elected to field.

20 December 2018
Scorecard

Peshawar; 99/8 (20 overs)	v	Lahore Whites; 100/1 (14.2 overs)
Saad Ali 37 (31); Umaid Asif 4/13 (4 overs)		Tayyab Tahir 51* (41); Sajid Khan 1/30 (4 overs)

Lahore Whites won by 9 wickets
Multan Cricket Stadium, Multan
Umpires: Ahmed Shahab and Majid Hussain

- Lahore Whites won the toss and elected to field.

20 December 2018
Scorecard

FATA; 140/9 (20 overs)	v	Lahore Blues; 141/1 (18.1 overs)
Sohail Akhtar 39 (27); Hussain Talat 3/22 (4 overs)		Rizwan Hussain 68* (54); Khushdil Shah 1/17 (2 overs)

Lahore Blues won by 9 wickets
Multan Cricket Stadium, Multan
Umpires: Waseemuddin and Mohammad Sajid

- Lahore Blues won the toss and elected to field.

21 December 2018
Scorecard

Karachi Whites; 156/6 (20 overs)	v	Islamabad; 157/8 (20 overs)
Danish Aziz 43* (27); Adeel Malik 2/26 (4 overs)		Asif Ali 97* (62); Mohammad Asghar 3/30 (4 overs)

Islamabad won by 2 wickets
Multan Cricket Stadium, Multan
Umpires: Qaiser Waheed and Rashid Riaz

- Islamabad won the toss and elected to field.

21 December 2018
Scorecard

Multan; 152/6 (20 overs)	v	Rawalpindi; 156/7 (19.5 overs)
Sohaib Maqsood 75* (54); Mohammad Nawaz 5/24 (4 overs)		Saud Shakeel 54 (35); Aamer Yamin 3/36 (4 overs)

Rawalpindi won by 3 wickets
Multan Cricket Stadium, Multan
Umpires: Abdul Muqeet and Imtiaz Iqbal

- Rawalpindi won the toss and elected to field.

22 December 2018
Scorecard

Lahore Blues; 141/4 (20 overs)	v	Peshawar; 142/3 (19.3 overs)
Hussain Talat 80* (52); Imran Khan 2/20 (4 overs)		Saad Ali 57* (38); Mohammad Irfan 1/10 (3 overs)

Peshawar won by 7 wickets
Multan Cricket Stadium, Multan
Umpires: Sultan Mahmood and Ahsan Raza

- Peshawar won the toss and elected to field.
- Ali Imran (Peshawar) made his T20 debut.

22 December 2018
Scorecard

FATA; 132/9 (20 overs)	v	Lahore Whites; 136/3 (17.3 overs)
Adil Amin 41* (29); Amad Butt 2/20 (4 overs)		Salman Butt 44 (38); Adil Amin 1/4 (1 over)

Lahore Whites won by 7 wickets
Multan Cricket Stadium, Multan
Umpires: Majid Hussain and Imtiaz Iqbal

- Lahore Whites won the toss and elected to field.

23 December 2018
Scorecard

Karachi Whites; 122/9 (20 overs)	v	Rawalpindi; 125/2 (16 overs)
Awais Zia 48 (44); Sadaf Hussain 3/24 (4 overs)		Naved Malik 57 (36); Arshad Iqbal 1/8 (2 overs)

Rawalpindi won by 8 wickets
Multan Cricket Stadium, Multan
Umpires: Zameer Haider and Waleed Yaqub

- Rawalpindi won the toss and elected to field.
- Nihal Mansoor (Rawalpindi) made his T20 debut.

23 December 2018
Scorecard

Multan; 117 (19 overs)	v	Islamabad; 119/3 (16.4 overs)
Zeeshan Malik 57 (55); Shehzad Azam 3/17 (4 overs)		Abid Ali 50* (48); Zulfiqar Babar 2/26 (4 overs)

Islamabad won by 7 wickets
Multan Cricket Stadium, Multan
Umpires: Ahsan Raza and Adnan Rasheed

- Islamabad won the toss and elected to field.

== Semi-finals ==
24 December 2018
Scorecard

Rawalpindi; 157/9 (20 overs)	v	Karachi Whites; 151/4 (20 overs)
Naved Malik 90 (54); Raza Hasan 2/21 (4 overs)		Fawad Alam 52* (37); Hammad Azam 2/27 (4 overs)

Rawalpindi won by 6 runs
Multan Cricket Stadium, Multan
Umpires: Ahsan Raza and Rashid Riaz
Player of the match: Naved Malik (Rawalpindi)

- Karachi Whites won the toss and elected to field.

24 December 2018
Scorecard

Lahore Whites; 219/6 (20 overs)	v	Islamabad; 131/8 (20 overs)
Kamran Akmal 93 (52); Sohail Khan 2/36 (4 overs)		Umar Gul 30* (31); Amad Butt 2/18 (4 overs)

Lahore Whites won by 88 runs
Multan Cricket Stadium, Multan
Umpires: Asif Yaqoob and Shozab Raza
Player of the match: Kamran Akmal (Lahore Whites)

- Islamabad won the toss and elected to field.

== Final ==
25 December 2018
Scorecard

Rawalpindi; 162/8 (20 overs)	v	Lahore Whites; 165/8 (19.2 overs)
Naved Malik 44 (29); Amad Butt 2/25 (4 overs)		Kamran Akmal 42 (31); Hammad Azam 3/39 (4 overs)

Lahore Whites won by 2 wickets
Multan Cricket Stadium, Multan
Umpires: Shozab Raza and Ahsan Raza
Player of the match: Saif Badar (Lahore Whites)

- Rawalpindi won the toss and elected to bat.
