= List of Lahore Whites cricketers =

List of first-class cricketers by club

This is an incomplete list in alphabetical order of cricketers who have played for Lahore Whites in top-class (Note: Top-class matches are first-class, List A, and Twenty20.) matches since the club initially achieved first-class status in 1963.

== Key ==
- † preceding a player's name means that the original article is now a redirect to this list.

== A ==
- Kamran Afzal
- Mustaqeem Ahmed
- Waqas Ahmed (cricketer, born 1992)
- Younis Ahmed
- Hamza Akbar (cricketer)
- Adnan Akmal
- Kamran Akmal
- Abid Ali (cricketer)
- Asim Ali
- Azhar Ali
- Nasir Ali (cricketer)
- Nauman Anwar
- Naeem Ashraf
- Qaiser Ashraf
- Ali Azmat (cricketer)

== B ==
- Haris Bashir
- Salman Butt

== C ==
- Aizaz Cheema
- Khurram Chohan

== E ==
- Saleem Elahi
- Zahoor Elahi

== F ==
- Humayun Farhat
- Salman Fayyaz
- Irfan Fazil

== H ==
- Gauhar Hafeez
- † Ameer Hamza
- Mohammad Hussain (cricketer)
- Rizwan Hussain (cricketer)

== I ==
- Mohammad Irfan
- Mohammad Irfan (cricketer, born October 1989)

== J ==
- Saad Janjua

== K ==
- Mohammad Khalil (cricketer)
- Ali Shamsher Khan
- Wasim Khan (cricketer, born 1978)

== M ==
- Aamer Malik
- Asif Masood
- Muntazir Mehdi
- Mohammad Mohsin (cricketer, born 1993)

== R ==
- Ali Rafiq
- Maqsood Rana
- Adnan Rasool
- Asif Raza
- Babar Rehman
- Wahab Riaz

== S ==
- † Afaq Shahid
- Arsal Sheikh
- Ikramullah Sheikh
- Umar Siddiq

== T ==
- Imran Tahir
- Hussain Talat

== U ==
- Taufeeq Umar

== Z ==
- Muhammad Zaid
- Irfan Zaman
- Ali Zaryab
