= 2016 Pakistan Cup =

Cricket tournament

- Dates: 19 April – 1 May 2016
- Administrator: Pakistan Cricket Board
- Cricket format: Limited overs (List A)
- Tournament format(s): Round-robin and final
- Host: Faisalabad
- Champions: Khyber Pakhtunkhwa
- Participants: 5
- Matches: 11
- Most runs: 372 – Ahmed Shehzad (Khyber)
- Most wickets: 11 – Mohammad Amir (Sindh)

The 2016 Pakistan Cup was a five-team limited overs (one-day) cricket tournament that took place in Faisalabad, Punjab, from 19 April to 1 May 2016. It was contested by teams representing Pakistan's four provinces and the capital. Squads for the tournament were selected based on a draft system.

Sarfraz Ahmed, Shoaib Malik, Younis Khan, Azhar Ali and Misbah-Ul-Haq led the sides from Sindh, Punjab, Khyber Pakhtunkhwa, Balochistan and Islamabad. Khyber Pakhtunkhwa won the tournament after defeating Punjab in the final by 151 runs.

== Venue ==
City	Venue	Capacity	Matches
Faisalabad, Punjab	Iqbal Stadium	28,000	11
		2016 Pakistan Cup is located in Pakistan	

== Squads ==
The teams were selected by the captain and the coach through a draft which consisted of 150 players. Each team was able to select a squad of 15 players. The following players were selected in the draft:

Punjab	Sindh	Balochistan	Islamabad	Khyber Pakhtunkhwa
Shoaib Malik (c); Aamer Yamin; Adnan Ghaus; Amad Butt; Asad Shafiq; Asif Ali; Akbar-ur-Rehman; Ehsan Adil; Kashif Bhatti; Mohammad Rizwan; Salman Butt; Shan Masood; Saad Nasim; Saif Badar; Salman Fayyaz; Zulfiqar Babar	Sarfraz Ahmed (c); Anwar Ali; Bilal Asif; Fawad Alam; Hassan Khan; Hasan Mohsin; Imad Wasim; Khalid Latif; Khurram Manzoor; Mohammad Waqas; Mohammad Amir; Ruman Raees; Sami Aslam; Sohaib Maqsood; Saad Ali; Sohail Khan	Azhar Ali (c); Awais Zia; Babar Azam; Bilawal Bhatti; Ghulam Haider; Junaid Khan; Mohammad Hasan; Mohammad Imran; Mohammad Nawaz; Ramiz Raja; Shahid Yousuf; Saeed Ajmal; Sohail Tanvir; Umar Akmal; Umar Gul; Usama Mir	Misbah-ul-Haq (c); Arsal Sheikh; Asif Zakir; Hammad Azam; Hasan Ali; Iftikhar Ahmed; Imran Khalid; Kamran Akmal; Mohammad Sami; Mohammad Irfan; Mohammad Abbas; Nasir Jamshed; Sharjeel Khan; Sarmad Bhatti; Shadab Khan; Zafar Gohar	Younis Khan (c); Ahmed Shehzad; Azizullah; Bismillah Khan; Faheem Ashraf; Fakhar Zaman; Hayatullah; Mohammad Asghar; Naved Yasin; Rahat Ali; Musadiq Ahmed; Rameez Aziz; Sadaif Mehdi; Sameen Gul; Yasir Shah; Zia-ul-Haq; Zohaib Khan

== Group stage ==
=== Points table ===
Teams	Pld	W	L	NR	NRR	Pts
Khyber Pakhtunkhwa	4	3	1	0	+0.383	6
Punjab	4	2	2	0	+0.601	4
Sindh	4	2	2	0	+0.166	4
Balochistan	4	2	2	0	-0.554	4
Islamabad	4	1	3	0	-0.740	2

Teams qualified for the Final

Source: ESPNcricinfo

=== Fixtures and results ===
19 April 2016
15:00 (D/N)
Scorecard

Baluchistan; 215 (46.2 overs)	v	Punjab; 203 (49 overs)
Shahid Yousuf 49 (68); Amad Butt 2/30 (6 overs)		Mohammad Rizwan 39 (52); Azhar Ali 3/24 (5 overs)

Balochistan won by 12 runs
Iqbal Stadium, Faisalabad
Umpires: Ahsan Raza and Khalid Mehmood
Player of the match: Azhar Ali (Baluchistan)

- Punjab won the toss and elected to field.
- Ghulam Haider (Baluchistan) and Saif Badar (Punjab) both made their List A debuts.

20 April 2016
15:00 (D/N)
Scorecard

Khyber Pakhtunkhwa; 212 (46.1 overs)	v	Islamabad; 205/8 (42.1 overs)
Younis Khan 61 (59); Hammad Azam 3/23 (7 overs)		Misbah-ul-Haq 82 (104); Zohaib Khan 3/36 (9 overs)

Islamabad won by 2 wickets (D/L method)
Iqbal Stadium, Faisalabad
Umpires: Shozab Raza and Rashid Riaz
Player of the match: Misbah-ul-Haq (Islamabad)

- Khyber Pakhtunkhwa won the toss and elected to bat.
- Shadab Khan (Islamabad) and Sameen Gul (Khyber Pakhtunkhwa) both made their List A debuts.

21 April 2016
15:00 (D/N)
Scorecard

Sindh; 266/4 (45 overs)	v	Baluchistan; 186/8 (31 overs)
Sami Aslam 108* (120); Saeed Ajmal 2/62 (10 overs)		Azhar Ali 100* (83); Mohammad Amir 2/19 (4 overs)

Sindh won by 42 runs (D/L method)
Iqbal Stadium, Faisalabad
Umpires: Ghaffar Kazmi and Khalid Mahmood
Player of the match: Khurram Manzoor (Sindh)

- Sindh won the toss and elected to bat.
- Hassan Khan (Sindh) made his List A debut.
- Ahsan Raza was the onfield umpire after 40 overs.

22 April 2016
15:00 (D/N)
Scorecard

Khyber Pakhtunkhwa; 262/6 (50 overs)	v	Punjab; 260/7 (50 overs)
Fakhar Zaman 64 (71); Aamer Yamin 2/54 (10 overs)		Salman Butt 77 (114); Rahat Ali 4/42 (10 overs)

Khyber Pakhtunkhwa won by 2 runs
Iqbal Stadium, Faisalabad
Umpires: Mohammad Sajid and Riazuddin
Player of the match: Rahat Ali (Khyber Pakhtunkhwa)

- Khyber Pakhtunkhwa won the toss and elected to bat.
- Hayatullah (Khyber Pakhtunkhwa) made his List A debut.

23 April 2016
15:00 (D/N)
Scorecard

Sindh; 336/6 (50 overs)	v	Islamabad; 218 (39.5 overs)
Khurram Manzoor 123 (90); Mohammad Irfan 2/45 (10 overs)		Misbah-ul-Haq 73 (59); Bilal Asif 4/39 (10 overs)

Sindh won by 118 runs
Iqbal Stadium, Faisalabad
Umpires: Ahsan Raza and Asif Yaqoob
Player of the match: Khurram Manzoor (Sindh)

- Sindh won the toss and elected to bat.

24 April 2016
15:00 (D/N)
Scorecard

Khyber Pakhtunkhwa; 246/8 (50 overs)	v	Baluchistan; 172 (45.1 overs)
Zohaib Khan 82 (112); Umar Gul 2/34 (6 overs)		Babar Azam 50 (67); Zohaib Khan 4/18 (9.1 overs)

Khyber Pakhtunkhwa won by 74 runs
Iqbal Stadium, Faisalabad
Umpires: Rashid Riaz and Shozab Raza
Player of the match: Zohaib Khan (Khyber Pakhtunkhwa)

- Khyber Pakhtunkhwa won the toss and elected to bat.
- Ahmed Shehzad replaced Younis Khan as the captain of the side, after Younis Khan left the tournament because of umpiring issue.

25 April 2016
15:00 (D/N)
Scorecard

Punjab; 213 (43.3 overs)	v	Islamabad; 183 (46.1 overs)
Asad Shafiq 54 (51); Mohammad Irfan 3/34 (7.3 overs)		Iftikhar Ahmed 67 (109); Amad Butt 4/34 (10 overs)

Punjab won by 30 runs
Iqbal Stadium, Faisalabad
Umpires: Ghaffar Kazmi and Khalid Mahmood
Player of the match: Amad Butt (Punjab)

- Punjab won the toss and elected to bat.

27 April 2016
15:00 (D/N)
Scorecard

Khyber Pakhtunkhwa; 319/6 (50 overs)	v	Sindh; 312/8 (50 overs)
Ahmed Shehzad 143 (135); Bilal Asif 2/46 (10 overs)		Khalid Latif 168* (129); Zia-ul-Haq 3/50 (10 overs)

Khyber Pakhtunkhwa won by 7 runs
Iqbal Stadium, Faisalabad
Umpires: Shozab Raza and Asif Yaqoob
Player of the match: Ahmed Shehzad (Khyber Pakhtunkhwa) and Khalid Latif (Sindh)

- Khyber Pakhtunkhwa won the toss and elected to bat.
- Khyber Pakhtunkhwa qualified for the final.

28 April 2016
15:00 (D/N)
Scorecard

Islamabad; 315/8 (50 overs)	v	Baluchistan; 317/7 (49.4 Overs)
Kamran Akmal 134 (102); Bilawal Bhatti 3/57 (10 overs)		Azhar Ali 80 (92); Mohammad Sami 3/63 (10 overs)

Baluchistan won by 3 wickets
Iqbal Stadium, Faisalabad
Umpires: Ahsan Raza and Ghaffar Kazmi
Player of the match: Kamran Akmal (Islamabad)

- Islamabad won the toss and elected to bat.
- Mohammad Imran (Balochistan) and Arsal Sheikh (Islamabad) both made their List A debuts.

29 April 2016
15:00 (D/N)
Scorecard

Sindh; 158 (46.3 overs)	v	Punjab; 159/5 (28 overs)
Fawad Alam 62 (99); Ehsan Adil 3/34 (10 overs)		Shan Masood 59 (77); Mohammad Amir 2/47 (10 overs)

Punjab won by 5 wickets
Iqbal Stadium, Faisalabad
Umpires: Rashid Riaz and Riazuddin
Player of the match: Shan Masood (Punjab)

- Sindh won the toss and elected to bat.
- Punjab qualified for the final.

== Final ==
1 May 2016
15:00 (D/N)
Scorecard

Khyber Pakhtunkhwa; 311/9 (50 Overs)	v	Punjab; 160 (36.1 Overs)
Fakhar Zaman 115 (111); Amad Butt 3/55 (10 Overs)		Shan Masood 36 (40); Zohaib Khan 3/23 (5 Overs)

Khyber Pakhtunkhwa won by 151 runs
Iqbal Stadium, Faisalabad
Umpires: Ahsan Raza and Shozab Raza
Player of the match: Fakhar Zaman (Khyber Pakhtunkhwa)

- Khyber Pakhtunkhwa won the toss and elected to bat.
- Younis Khan led his team after apologising to the PCB.
