= Israr =

Israr is a given name and surname of Arabic origin. Notable people with the name include:

== Given name ==
- Israr Ahmad (1940–2010), Indian theoretical nuclear physicist, professor at Aligarh Muslim University
- Israr Ahmed (1932–2010), Pakistani Islamic scholar, orator and theologian
- Israr Ahmed (cricketer) (born 1999), Pakistani cricketer
- Israr Ahmed (squash player) (born 1997), Pakistani professional squash player
- Israr Ali (1927–2016), member of Pakistan's first Test cricket team that played against India in 1952–53
- Israr Azim (born 1990), Indian cricketer
- Israr Hussain (born 1986), Pakistani swimmer
- Israr-ul-Haq (born 1994), Pakistani cricketer
- Israr Ullah Khan Gandapur (1975–2013), murdered Pakistani politician, member of the Provincial Assembly of Khyber Pakhtunkhwa
- Israr Ullah Zehri (born 1965), Pakistani politician
- Muhammad Israr Tareen, Pakistani politician, member of the National Assembly of Pakistan

== Surname ==
- Shahid Israr (1950–2013), Pakistani cricketer

== See also ==
- Israr Ahmed (disambiguation)
