= 2016–17 Regional One Day Cup =

Cricket tournament

- Dates: 8 – 27 January 2017
- Administrator(s): Pakistan Cricket Board
- Cricket format: List A cricket
- Tournament format(s): Round-robin and Final
- Champions: Peshawar
- Participants: 8
- Matches: 29
- Most runs: Khurram Manzoor (395)
- Most wickets: Sohail Tanvir (15)
- Official website: PCB

The 2016–17 Regional One Day Cup was a List A cricket tournament in Pakistan. The competition ran from 8 to 27 January 2017. The final was played between Karachi Whites and Peshawar, with Peshawar winning by 124 runs.

== Teams ==
The following teams are competing:

- Federally Administered Tribal Areas
- Islamabad
- Karachi Blues
- Karachi Whites
- Lahore Blues
- Lahore Whites
- Peshawar
- Rawalpindi

== Points table ==
Team	Pld	W	L	NR	Pts	NRR
Karachi Whites	7	4	0	3	11	+1.046
Karachi Blues	7	4	1	2	10	+0.779
Islamabad	7	3	2	2	8	+0.195
Peshawar	7	2	2	3	7	–0.170
Rawalpindi	7	2	3	2	6	+0.161
Federally Administered Tribal Areas	7	2	3	2	6	+0.043
Lahore Blues	7	1	3	3	5	–1.205
Lahore Whites	7	0	4	3	3	–0.860

Teams qualified for the finals

== Fixtures ==
=== Round-robin ===
8 January 2017
Scorecard

Lahore Blues	v	Lahore Whites

Match abandoned
Marghzar Cricket Ground, Islamabad
Umpires: Sajid Afridi and Shameem Ansari

- No toss.

8 January 2017
Scorecard

Karachi Blues; 143 (29.5 overs)	v	Karachi Whites; 121/5 (25 overs)
Khalid Latif 40 (63); Danish Aziz 4/27 (4.5 overs)		Akbar-ur-Rehman 54* (65); Adeel Malik 2/29 (5 overs)

Karachi Whites won by 8 runs (D/L method)
National Ground, Islamabad
Umpires: Ghaffar Kazmi and Tahir Shah

- Karachi Whites won the toss and elected to field.
- Danish Aziz (Karachi Whites) made his List A debut.

8 January 2017
Scorecard

Islamabad; 175/9 (35 overs)	v	Rawalpindi; 178/2 (27.5 overs)
Abid Ali 68 (59); Sadaf Hussain 4/32 (7 overs)		Naved Malik 110* (86); Ahmed Shehzad 1/11 (0.5 overs)

Rawalpindi won by 8 wickets
Diamond Club Ground, Islamabad
Umpires: Ahmed Shahab and Mohammad Asif

- Rawalpindi won the toss and elected to field.

8 January 2017
Scorecard

FATA; 148 (22.5 overs)	v	Peshawar; 152/4 (22 overs)
Khushdil Shah 55 (41); Junaid Khan 4/31 (4.5 overs)		Iftikhar Ahmed 48 (42); Asif Ali 2/26 (5 overs)

Peshawar won by 6 wickets
Rawalpindi Cricket Stadium, Rawalpindi
Umpires: Ahsan Raza and Zameer Haider

- Peshawar won the toss and elected to field.

10 January 2017
Scorecard

FATA; 224 (46.4 overs)	v	Rawalpindi; 218 (49.4 overs)
Hussain Talat 123 (139); Kashif Bhatti 3/40 (10 overs)		Shadab Khan 56 (63); Asif Afridi 2/29 (10 overs)

Federally Administered Tribal Areas won by 6 runs
Marghzar Cricket Ground, Islamabad
Umpires: Adnan Rasheed and Ahmed Shahab

- Rawalpindi won the toss and elected to field.

10 January 2017
Scorecard

Lahore Blues; 217/8 (46 overs)	v	Karachi Blues; 204/5 (43 overs)
Kamran Akmal 47 (72); Sohail Khan 4/34 (9 overs)		Khurram Manzoor 114 (133); Saad Nasim 1/23 (4 overs)

Karachi Blues won by 10 runs (D/L method)
National Ground, Islamabad
Umpires: Aslam Bareach and Zameer Haider

- Karachi Blues won the toss and elected to field.

10 January 2017
Scorecard

Islamabad; 245/6 (47 overs)	v	Peshawar; 135 (32.2 overs)
Faizan Riaz 78 (76); Khalid Usman 2/36 (10 overs)		Iftikhar Ahmed 31 (46); Shehzad Azam 4/30 (7 overs)

Islamabad won by 110 runs
Diamond Club Ground, Islamabad
Umpires: Mohammad Asif and Tahir Shah

- Peshawar won the toss and elected to field.
- Ali Imran (Islamabad) made his List A debut.

10 January 2017
Scorecard

Lahore Whites; 150/7 (24 overs)	v	Karachi Whites; 153/3 (22.1 overs)
Anas Mahmood 56 (51); Anwar Ali 3/36 (5 overs)		Akbar-ur-Rehman 43 (41); Qaiser Ashraf 2/26 (5 overs)

Karachi Whites won by 7 wickets
Rawalpindi Cricket Stadium, Rawalpindi
Umpires: Majid Hussain and Sajid Afridi

- Karachi Whites won the toss and elected to field.

12 January 2017
Scorecard

Lahore Whites; 180 (33.5 overs)	v	Karachi Blues; 183/5 (33.4 overs)
Imam-ul-Haq 38 (39); Mohammad Asghar 3/16 (7 overs)		Khurram Manzoor 77* (70); Ahmed Bashir 3/30 (8 overs)

Karachi Blues won by 5 wickets
Marghzar Cricket Ground, Islamabad
Umpires: Aslam Bareach and Mohammad Asif

- Karachi Blues won the toss and elected to field.

12 January 2017
Scorecard

Karachi Whites; 240 (45.2 overs)	v	Lahore Blues; 170 (43.3 overs)
Anwar Ali 67 (68); Waqas Ahmed 4/49 (9 overs)		Raza Ali Dar 49 (63); Danish Aziz 3/28 (6.3 overs)

Karachi Whites won by 70 runs
National Ground, Islamabad
Umpires: Majid Hussain and Zameer Haider

- Lahore Blues won the toss and elected to field.

12 January 2017
Scorecard

FATA; 266/6 (43 overs)	v	Islamabad; 270/7 (43 overs)
Khushdil Shah 108 (114); Shehzad Azam 3/55 (9 overs)		Faizan Riaz 51 (42); Asif Ali 3/54 (8 overs)

Islamabad won by 3 wickets
Diamond Club Ground, Islamabad
Umpires: Riazuddin and Tahir Shah

- Islamabad won the toss and elected to field.
- Hafidullah (Federally Administered Tribal Areas) made his List A debut.

12 January 2017
Scorecard

Peshawar; 180 (42.4 overs)	v	Rawalpindi; 183/2 (30.5 overs)
Khalid Usman 66 (57); Shadab Khan 3/25 (9 overs)		Naved Malik 83* (90); Khalid Usman 1/28 (9 overs)

Rawalpindi won by 8 wickets
Rawalpindi Cricket Stadium, Rawalpindi
Umpires: Ahsan Raza and Waleed Yaqub

- Rawalpindi won the toss and elected to field.

14 January 2017
Scorecard

Lahore Whites; 270/6 (50 overs)	v	Islamabad; 272/1 (47.3 overs)
Usman Salahuddin 90* (94); Arsal Sheikh 2/53 (10 overs)		Ahmed Shehzad 163* (144); Adnan Rasool 1/58 (10 overs)

Islamabad won by 9 wickets
Rawalpindi Cricket Stadium, Rawalpindi
Umpires: Imtiaz Iqbal and Riazuddin

- Islamabad won the toss and elected to field.

14 January 2017
Scorecard

Lahore Blues; 259 (46.1 overs)	v	Rawalpindi; 196/7 (37 overs)
Raza Ali Dar 63 (55); Sohail Tanvir 5/30 (9.1 overs)		Sohaib Maqsood 41 (49); Zafar Gohar 3/25 (8 overs)

Lahore Blues won by 14 runs (D/L method)
Diamond Club Ground, Islamabad
Umpires: Sajid Afridi and Tahir Rasheed

- Rawalpindi won the toss and elected to field.
- Tayyab Abbas and Umair Masood (Rawalpindi) both made their List A debuts.

14 January 2017
Scorecard

Karachi Whites	v	Peshawar

Match abandoned
Arbab Niaz Stadium, Peshawar
Umpires: Qaiser Waheed and Shozab Raza

- No toss.

14 January 2017
Scorecard

FATA; 268/6 (47 overs)	v	Karachi Blues; 176/4 (30 overs)
Hussain Talat 119* (121); Mohammad Asghar 2/35 (10 overs)		Khurram Manzoor 77 (80); Irfanullah Shah 1/18 (3 overs)

Karachi Blues won by 18 runs (D/L method)
Marghzar Cricket Ground, Islamabad
Umpires: Ahmed Shahab and Ahsan Raza

- Karachi Blues won the toss and elected to field.

16 January 2017
Scorecard

Lahore Whites	v	Rawalpindi

Match abandoned
Marghzar Cricket Ground, Islamabad
Umpires: Imtiaz Iqbal and Tahir Rasheed

- No toss.

16 January 2017
Scorecard

Islamabad	v	Lahore Blues

Match abandoned
Rawalpindi Cricket Stadium, Rawalpindi
Umpires: Khalid Mahmood and Riazuddin

- No toss.

16 January 2017
Scorecard

FATA	v	Karachi Whites

Match abandoned
Diamond Club Ground, Islamabad
Umpires: Ghaffar Kazmi and Zameer Haider

- No toss.

16 January 2017
Scorecard

Karachi Blues	v	Peshawar

Match abandoned
Arbab Niaz Stadium, Peshawar
Umpires: Qaiser Waheed and Shozab Raza

- No toss.

18 January 2017
Scorecard

Lahore Whites	v	Peshawar

Match abandoned
Arbab Niaz Stadium, Peshawar
Umpires: Aslam Bareach and Riazuddin

- No toss.

18 January 2017
Scorecard

FATA	v	Lahore Blues

Match abandoned
National Ground, Islamabad
Umpires: Aaley Haider and Khalid Mahmood

- No toss.

18 January 2017
Scorecard

Islamabad	v	Karachi Whites

Match abandoned
Diamond Club Ground, Islamabad
Umpires: Abdul Muqeet and Qaiser Waheed

- No toss.

18 January 2017
Scorecard

Karachi Blues	v	Rawalpindi

Match abandoned
Rawalpindi Cricket Stadium, Rawalpindi
Umpires: Shozab Raza and Zameer Haider

- No toss.

20 January 2017
Scorecard

Lahore Whites; 256/9 (47 overs)	v	FATA; 259/3 (41.3 overs)
Umar Siddiq 65 (66); Asif Ali 3/41 (10 overs)		Khushdil Shah 102* (93); Ahmed Bashir 2/52 (9.3 overs)

Federally Administered Tribal Areas won by 7 wickets
Marghzar Cricket Ground, Islamabad
Umpires: Asif Yaqoob and Aslam Bareach

- Federally Administered Tribal Areas won the toss and elected to field.
- Nisar Ahmed, Saleem Burki (Federally Administered Tribal Areas) and Kamran Afzal (Lahore Whites) all made their List A debuts.

20 January 2017
Scorecard

Peshawar; 200 (39.1 overs)	v	Lahore Blues; 66 (25.1 overs)
Iftikhar Ahmed 75 (79); Raza Ali Dar 4/39 (8 overs)		Zain-ul-Hasan 19 (15); Iftikhar Ahmed 3/3 (3.1 overs)

Peshawar won by 134 runs
Arbab Niaz Stadium, Peshawar
Umpires: Aaley Haider and Khalid Mahmood

- Peshawar won the toss and elected to bat.
- Sajid Khan (Peshawar) made his List A debut.

20 January 2017
Scorecard

Karachi Whites; 259/8 (43 overs)	v	Rawalpindi; 206 (37.1 overs)
Saad Ali 66 (59); Sohail Tanvir 5/49 (9 overs)		Sohail Tanvir 39 (23); Anwar Ali 3/30 (6 overs)

Karachi Whites won by 53 runs
Rawalpindi Cricket Stadium, Rawalpindi
Umpires: Shozab Raza and Waleed Yaqub

- Rawalpindi won the toss and elected to field.

20 January 2017
Scorecard

Islamabad; 224/6 (43 overs)	v	Karachi Blues; 188/2 (32 overs)
Ahmed Shehzad 62 (42); Mohammad Asghar 4/61 (9 overs)		Saud Shakeel 74 (73); Zohaib Ahmed 1/34 (6 overs)

Karachi Blues won by 49 runs (D/L method)
Diamond Club Ground, Islamabad
Umpires: Ghaffar Kazmi and Qaiser Waheed

- Karachi Blues won the toss and elected to field.
- Aun Abbas (Islamabad) made his List A debut.

== Finals ==
1st Semi-final
23 January 2017
Scorecard

Karachi Whites; 375/6 (50 overs)	v	Islamabad; 305 (48.1 overs)
Shahzaib Hasan 171 (117); Shehzad Azam 3/81 (9 overs)		Shan Masood 136 (116); Anwar Ali 5/49 (9.1 overs)

Karachi Whites won by 70 runs
National Stadium, Karachi
Umpires: Ahmed Shahab and Ahsan Raza

- Islamabad won the toss and elected to field.
- Anwar Ali (Karachi Whites) took his best figures in a List A match.

2nd Semi-final
24 January 2017
Scorecard

Peshawar; 303/5 (50 overs)	v	Karachi Blues; 280 (47.4 overs)
Israrullah 153* (148); Mohammad Sami 2/51 (10 overs)		Khurram Manzoor 87 (102); Taj Wali 3/32 (8.4 overs)

Peshawar won by 23 runs
National Stadium, Karachi
Umpires: Riazuddin and Shozab Raza

- Peshawar won the toss and elected to bat.
- Shah Faisal (Peshawar) made his List A debut.

Final
27 January 2017
Scorecard

Peshawar; 321/2 (50 overs)	v	Karachi Whites; 197 (39.5 overs)
Gauhar Ali 145* (128); Anwar Ali 1/58 (10 overs)		Anwar Ali 51 (47); Iftikhar Ahmed 3/12 (4 overs)

Peshawar won by 124 runs
National Stadium, Karachi
Umpires: Ahsan Raza and Shozab Raza
Player of the match: Gauhar Ali and Iftikhar Ahmed (Peshawar)

- Karachi Whites won the toss and elected to field.
