= 2023–24 Hanif Mohammad Trophy =

- Dates: 10 September 2023 – 26 October 2024
- Administrator: Pakistan Cricket Board
- Tournament format(s): round-robin group stage and final
- Host: Pakistan
- Champions: Islamabad (1st title)
- Participants: 10
- Matches: 29
- Most runs: Hassan Nawaz (530)
- Most wickets: Jawad Ali (46)
- Official website: www.pcb.com.pk

The 2023–24 Hanif Mohammad Trophy is a domestic sub-first-class cricket competition in Pakistan. It is the first edition of the Hanif Mohammad Trophy, and it is contested by ten teams representing regional cricket associations. It ran concurrently with the first-class Quaid-e-Azam Trophy, contested by eight regional associations. The winners of the Hanif Mohammad Trophy will be promoted to the Quaid-e-Azam Trophy for 2024–25.

== Teams ==
10 regional teams participating for the 2023–24 season.

- Abbottabad
- Azad Jammu & Kashmir
- Bahawalpur
- Dera Murad Jamali
- Hyderabad
- Islamabad
- Karachi Blues
- Larkana
- Quetta
- Sialkot

== Teams ==
Location of Teams in Pakistan

== Points System ==
- Win: 16
- Draw: 5
- Tied: 8
- Abandoned: 5

Winning Bonus Points:

- Winning the match after follow-on: 2
- Win with an innings margin: 1
- Saving the match after follow-on: 1

Batting Points For First Innings (100 overs):

- 200 Runs: 1
- 250 Runs: 2
- 300 Runs: 3
- 350 Runs: 4
- 400 Runs: 5

Bowling Points For First Innings (100 overs):
Over-Based Points:

- 3 Wickets: 1
- 6 Wickets: 2
- 8 Wickets: 3

All-Out Bonus Points:

- 200 or Less: 3
- 250 or Less: 2
- 300 or Less: 1

== Group stage ==
=== Group A ===
Points table

Team	Pld	W	L	D	T	NR	Pts	NRR
Quetta	4	2	0	2	0	0	71	0.933
Islamabad	4	2	0	2	0	0	71	0.553
Sialkot	4	2	0	2	0	0	62	0.138
Azad Jammu & Kashmir	4	0	3	1	0	0	29	-0.905
Larkana	4	0	3	1	0	0	22	-1.128

- The top 2 teams qualified for the Super Four

=== Group B ===
Points table

Team	Pld	W	L	D	T	NR	Pts	NRR
Abbottabad	4	3	0	1	0	0	80	0.587
Hyderabad	4	2	1	1	0	0	59	-0.768
Bahawalpur	4	2	1	1	0	0	58	0.360
Karachi Blues	4	2	2	0	0	0	56	0.420
Dera Murad Jamali	4	0	4	0	0	0	16	-0.565

- The top 2 teams qualified for the Super Four

== Super Four ==
Points table

Team	Pld	W	L	D	T	NR	Pts	NRR
Islamabad	3	2	1	0	0	0	54	0.730
Quetta	3	2	1	0	0	0	52	0.100
Hyderabad	3	1	2	0	0	0	30	-0.669
Abbottabad	3	1	2	0	0	0	29	-0.116

- Islamabad won the Hanif Mohammad Trophy as top team Super Four Stage.

10–13 October 2023
Scorecard

Quetta	v	Hyderabad
201 (80.4 overs); Shahbaz Khan 52* (143); Asad Malik 5/60 (25.4 overs)		200 (78.1 overs); Daniyal Hussain 53 (102); Jalat Khan 6/61 (36 overs)
162 (59 overs); Bismillah Khan 52 (84); Asad Malik 7/42 (17 overs)		220 (93.2 overs); Daniyal Hussain 62 (140); Jalat Khan 4/41 (36.2 overs)

Hyderabad won by 57 runs
Mehmood Stadium, Rahim Yar Khan
Umpires: Kamran Khalil and Khalid Mahmood

- Quetta won the toss and elected to field.
- Points: Hyderabad 22, Quetta 7

10–13 October 2023
Scorecard

Abbottabad	v	Islamabad
101 (32.5 overs); Ahmed Khan 20 (33); Azan Tariq 4/25 (10 overs)		307 (119.5 overs); Sarmad Bhatti 86 (199); Khalid Usman 4/63 (41.5 overs)
279 (111 overs); Ahmed Khan 119 (303); Farmanullah Khan 6/57 (32 overs)		77/0 (13.5 overs); Hassan Nawaz 43* (52)

Islamabad won by 10 wickets
Gaddafi Stadium, Lahore
Umpires: Hassan Mahmood and Waqar Ahmed

- Abbottabad won the toss and elected to bat.
- Points: Islamabad 24, Abbottabad 2

16–18 October 2023
Scorecard

Abbottabad	v	Quetta
243 (75.3 overs); Anees Azam 99 (192); Jalat Khan 4/33 (22.3 overs)		272 (91 overs); Shahbaz Khan 70 (138); Adil Naz 3/67 (23 overs)
106 (43.3 overs); Afaq Khan 30 (64); Gohar Faiz 6/47 (16 overs)		79/4 (16.5 overs); Mohammad Ibrahim 46 (41); Adil Naz 3/40 (8 overs)

Quetta won by 6 wickets
Multan Cricket Stadium, Multan
Umpires: Ahmed Shahab and Waqar Ahmed

- Quetta won the toss and elected to field.
- Points: Quetta 23, Abbottabad 5

16–18 October 2023
Scorecard

Islamabad	v	Hyderabad
304 (120.2 overs); Farmanullah Khan 72 (270); Jawad Ali 5/96 (49 overs)		190 (87.2 overs); Rizwan Mehmood 43 (74); Shayan Sheikh 7/48 (23.2 overs)
235/7d (54 overs); Hassan Nawaz 92 (130); Jawad Ali 3/79 (17 overs)		184 (101.3 overs); Haris Khan 83 (264); Farmanullah Khan 4/41 (26.3 overs)

Islamabad won by 165 runs
Mehmood Stadium, Rahim Yar Khan
Umpires: Irfan Haider and Qaiser Waheed

- Islamabad won the toss and elected to bat.
- Points: Islamabad 24, Hyderabad 2

22–25 October 2023
Scorecard

Islamabad	v	Quetta
150 (53.3 overs); Rizwan Ali 36 (113); Gohar Faiz 3/29 (17 overs)		198 (82.5 overs); Lateefullah 48 (119)48 119; Azan Tariq 3/18 (14.5 overs)
238 (71.2 overs); Hassan Nawaz 71 (62); Jalat Khan 5/50 (32.2 overs)		191/5 (50.3 overs); Hazrat Wali 65 (98); Mohammad Naeem 3/78 (17 overs)

Quetta won by 5 wickets
Multan Cricket Stadium, Multan
Umpires: Ahmed Shahab and Hassan Mahmood

- Islamabad won the toss and elected to bat.
- Points: Quetta 22, Islamabad 6

22–25 October 2023
Scorecard

Hyderabad	v	Abbottabad
128 (53.1 overs); Daniyal Hussain 48 (143); Fayyaz Khan 4/32 (12 overs)		162 (44.1 overs); Anees Azam 53 (44); Jawad Ali 6/48 (17 overs)
220 (75.1 overs); Rizwan Mehmood 82 (97); Khalid Usman 7/57 (29.1 overs)		187/7 (47.3 overs); Mehroz Rasheed 46 (88); Jawad Ali 3/61 (18.3 overs)

Abbottabad won by 3 wickets
Mehmood Stadium, Rahim Yar Khan
Umpires: Irfan Haider and Qaiser Waheed

- Hyderabad won the toss and elected to bat.
- Points: Abbottabad 22, Hyderabad 6
