= Shoaib Ahmed (Pakistani cricketer) =

Pakistani cricketer (born 1990)

Personal information
- Full name: Shoaib Ahmed Minhas
- Born: 17 August 1990 (age 36); Rawalpindi, Pakistan
- Batting: Right-handed
- Bowling: Right-arm fast-medium
- Role: Batsman
- Source: Cricinfo, 24 November 2015

Shoaib Ahmed (born 17 August 1990) is a Pakistani first-class cricketer who plays for Khan Research Laboratories. He made his first-class debut for Federal Areas against Sindh on 12 February 2012.

Shoaib was the leading run-scorer for Khan Research Laboratories in the 2018–19 Quaid-e-Azam One Day Cup, with 336 runs in seven matches.
