= Moazzam Malik =

Moazzam Malik may refer to:

- Moazzam Malik (cricketer)
- Moazzam Malik (diplomat)
