= 2018 Pakistan Cup =

Cricket tournament

- Dates: 25 April 2018 – 6 May 2018
- Administrator: Pakistan Cricket Board
- Cricket format: List A
- Tournament format(s): Round-robin and final
- Host: Faisalabad
- Champions: Federal Areas (2nd title)
- Participants: 5
- Matches: 11
- Most runs: Khurram Manzoor (393)
- Most wickets: Waqas Maqsood (14)

The 2018 Pakistan Cup was the third edition of the Pakistan Cup, a List A cricket competition which was contested between five teams. It was held from 25 April to 6 May 2018, with all the matches played at the Iqbal Stadium, Faisalabad. Federal Areas were the defending champions.

Federal Areas were the first team to advance to the final, after they beat Punjab by 7 wickets. They were joined in the final with Khyber Pakhtunkhwa, after the last group stage match, between Punjab and Sindh, finished as a tie. Federal Areas won the tournament, beating Khyber Pakhtunkhwa by five wickets in the final.

== Squads ==
Prior to the start of the tournament, the following squads were announced:

Baluchistan	Federal Areas	Khyber Pakhtunkhwa	Punjab	Sindh
Ahmed Shehzad (c); Mohammad Nawaz (vc); Rizwan Hussain; Rameez Raja; Khushdil Shah; Akbar-ur-Rehman; Faizan Riaz; Rohail Nazir; Bismillah Khan; Mohammad Irfan; Sohail Tanvir; Anwar Ali; Mir Hamza; Umar Gul; Shaheen Afridi	Kamran Akmal (c); Sohaib Maqsood (vc); Sarmad Bhatti; Abid Ali; Awais Zia; Ashiq Ali; Saad Nasim; Hussain Talat; Raza Ali Dar; Raza Hasan; Amad Butt; Agha Salman; Waqas Maqsood; Usman Khan; Umaid Asif	Mohammad Hafeez (c); Shan Masood (vc); Khurram Manzoor; Israrullah; Umar Akmal; Saud Shakeel; Mohammad Saad; Mohammad Irfan; Adil Amin; Hasan Khan; Hammad Azam; Zia-ul-Haq; Sameen Gul; Sadaf Hussain; Mohammad Hasan	Shoaib Malik (c); Mohammad Rizwan (vc); Zain Abbas; Sahibzada Farhan; Abdul Samad; Asif Ali; Ashfaq Ahmed; Sohail Akhtar; Usama Mir; Kashif Bhatti; Imran Khan; Mohammad Sami; Wahab Riaz; Shahid Yousuf; Abdul Rehman Muzammil	Umar Amin (c); Fawad Alam (vc); Salman Butt; Gauhar Ali; Iftikhar Ahmed; Danish Aziz; Rameez Aziz; Adnan Akmal; Mohammad Asghar; Bilal Asif; Aamer Yamin; Junaid Khan; Sohail Khan; Taj Wali; Mohammad Irfan

== Group stage ==
=== Points table ===
Pos	Team	Pld	W	L	T	NR	Pts	NRR
1	Federal Areas	4	4	0	0	0	8	2.323
2	Khyber Pakhtunkhwa	4	2	2	0	0	4	0.740
3	Punjab	4	1	2	1	0	3	−0.975
4	Sindh	4	1	2	1	0	3	−1.555
5	Baluchistan	4	1	3	0	0	2	−0.539

Teams qualified for the final

=== Fixtures ===
25 April 2018
14:30 (D/N)
Scorecard

Baluchistan; 365/3 (50 overs)	v	Punjab; 366/3 (48.5 overs)
Bismillah Khan 106 (105); Kashif Bhatti 1/59 (10 overs)		Sahibzada Farhan 155 (145); Shaheen Afridi 1/61 (9 overs)

Punjab won by 7 wickets
Iqbal Stadium, Faisalabad
Umpires: Rashid Riaz and Mohammad Sajid
Player of the match: Sahibzada Farhan (Punjab)

- Baluchistan won the toss and elected to bat.
- Shaheen Afridi (Baluchistan) made his List A debut.
- Sahibzada Farhan (Punjab) scored his highest total in List A cricket.

26 April 2018
14:30 (D/N)
Scorecard

Federal Areas; 373/6 (50 overs)	v	Khyber Pakhtunkhwa; 259 (43.1 overs)
Kamran Akmal 105 (84); Sadaf Hussain 3/67 (10 overs)		Mohammad Hafeez 76 (58); Waqas Maqsood 3/40 (8 overs)

Federal Areas won by 114 runs
Iqbal Stadium, Faisalabad
Umpires: Zameer Haider and Qaiser Waheed
Player of the match: Kamran Akmal (Federal Areas)

- Federal Areas won the toss and elected to bat.

27 April 2018
14:30 (D/N)
Scorecard

Sindh; 366/8 (50 overs)	v	Baluchistan; 354 (49.2 overs)
Iftikhar Ahmed 116 (83); Umar Gul 2/53 (8 overs)		Ahmed Shehzad 84 (49); Junaid Khan 4/55 (7.2 overs)

Sindh won by 12 runs
Iqbal Stadium, Faisalabad
Umpires: Zameer Haider and Ghaffar Kazmi
Player of the match: Iftikhar Ahmed (Sindh)

- Sindh won the toss and elected to bat.

28 April 2018
14:30 (D/N)
Scorecard

Punjab; 297/9 (50 overs)	v	Khyber Pakhtunkhwa; 298/0 (38.1 overs)
Asif Ali 121 (97); Zia-ul-Haq 4/60 (10 overs)		Khurram Manzoor 190* (118)

Khyber Pakhtunkhwa won by 10 wickets
Iqbal Stadium, Faisalabad
Umpires: Rashid Riaz and Ahmed Shahab
Player of the match: Khurram Manzoor (Khyber Pakhtunkhwa)

- Khyber Pakhtunkhwa won the toss and elected to field.
- Khurram Manzoor (Khyber Pakhtunkhwa) scored his highest total in List A cricket.

29 April 2018
14:30 (D/N)
Scorecard

Federal Areas; 242/8 (50 overs)	v	Sindh; 93 (31 overs)
Abid Ali 109 (145); Mohammad Irfan 2/28 (10 overs)		Khurram Shehzad 25 (50); Agha Salman 3/8 (4 overs)

Federal Areas won by 149 runs
Iqbal Stadium, Faisalabad
Umpires: Ahmed Shahab and Shozab Raza
Player of the match: Abid Ali (Federal Areas)

- Sindh won the toss and elected to field.

30 April 2018
14:30 (D/N)
Scorecard

Khyber Pakhtunkhwa; 372/8 (50 overs)	v	Baluchistan; 378/6 (49.1 overs)
Khurram Manzoor 111 (99); Mohammad Nawaz 3/72 (10 overs)		Ahmed Shehzad 72 (36); Hammad Azam 2/44 (10 overs)

Baluchistan won by 4 wickets
Iqbal Stadium, Faisalabad
Umpires: Waleed Yaqub and Ahsan Raza
Player of the match: Anwar Ali (Baluchistan)

- Khyber Pakhtunkhwa won the toss and elected to bat.

1 May 2018
14:30 (D/N)
Scorecard

Punjab; 306 (48.2 overs)	v	Federal Areas; 311/3 (35.1 overs)
Mohammad Rizwan 140 (123); Usman Khan 5/51 (9.2 overs)		Kamran Akmal 170 (96); Usama Mir 2/96 (10 overs)

Federal Area won by 7 wickets
Iqbal Stadium, Faisalabad
Umpires: Ahmed Shahab and Ahsan Raza
Player of the match: Kamran Akmal (Federal Areas)

- Federal Areas won the toss and elected to field.
- Mohammad Rizwan (Punjab) scored his highest total in List A cricket.

2 May 2018
14:30 (D/N)
Scorecard

Sindh; 196 (46.2 overs)	v	Khyber Pakhtunkhwa; 202/5 (23 overs)
Fawad Alam 52 (80); Zia-ul-Haq 4/24 (9.2 overs)		Israrullah 74 (61); Aamer Yamin 2/52 (5 overs)

Khyber Pakhtunkhwa won by 5 wickets
Iqbal Stadium, Faisalabad
Umpires: Shozab Raza and Asif Yaqoob
Player of the match: Zia-ul-Haq (Khyber Pakhtunkhwa)

- Khyber Pakhtunkhwa won the toss and elected to field.
- The match was reduced to 49 overs per side due to a wet outfield.

3 May 2018
14:30 (D/N)
Scorecard

Federal Areas; 304 (47.2 overs)	v	Baluchistan; 206 (23.2 overs)
Sohaib Maqsood 92 (47); Mohammad Nawaz 4/62 (10 overs)		Sohail Tanvir 42 (22); Waqas Maqsood 6/63 (7.2 overs)

Federal Areas won by 98 runs
Iqbal Stadium, Faisalabad
Umpires: Khalid Mahmood and Imtiaz Iqbal
Player of the match: Waqas Maqsood (Federal Areas)

- Baluchistan won the toss and elected to field.

4 May 2018
14:30 (D/N)
Scorecard

Punjab; 310/9 (50 overs)	v	Sindh; 310/7 (50 overs)
Asif Ali 138 (91); Bilal Asif 3/51 (10 overs)		Salman Butt 101 (91); Usama Mir 4/62 (10 overs)

Match tied
Iqbal Stadium, Faisalabad
Umpires: Ahsan Raza and Asif Yaqoob
Player of the match: Asif Ali (Punjab)

- Sindh won the toss and elected to field.

== Final ==
6 May 2018
14:30 (D/N)
Scorecard

Khyber Pakhtunkhwa; 252 (43.4 overs)	v	Federal Areas; 254/5 (41 overs)
Mohammad Hafeez 89 (86); Usman Khan 3/34 (8 overs)		Agha Salman 60 (77); Zia-ul-Haq 2/60 (10 overs)

Federal Areas won by 5 wickets
Iqbal Stadium, Faisalabad
Umpires: Ahsan Raza and Asif Yaqoob
Player of the match: Hussain Talat (Federal Areas)

- Federal Areas won the toss and elected to field.
