= Israr Ahmed (disambiguation) =

Israr Ahmed (1932–2010) was a Pakistani Islamic theologian, philosopher and Islamic scholar.

Israr Ahmed may also refer to:

- Israr Ahmed (squash player) (born 1997), Pakistani professional squash player
- Israr Ahmed (cricketer) (born 1999), Pakistani cricketer
- Israr Ahmad (physicist) (1940–2010), Indian theoretical nuclear physicist
- Sheikh Israr Ahmad, Pakistani politician
