= Haider Rameez =

Pakistani cricketer (born 1988)

Personal information
- Born: 13 November 1988 (age 37)
- Source: Cricinfo, 24 October 2018

Haider Rameez (born 13 November 1988) is a Pakistani cricketer. He made his List A debut for Habib Bank Limited in the 2018–19 Quaid-e-Azam One Day Cup on 24 October 2018.
