= National Ground =

Cricket field in Pakistan

- Location: Islamabad, Pakistan
- Country: Pakistan
- Establishment: 2009/10
- As of 8 January 2017; Source: Ground profile

The National Ground is a cricket ground in Islamabad, Pakistan. The first recorded match on the ground was in the 2009/10 season. The ground has hosted thirty first-class matches since 2009. It was selected as a venue to host matches in the 2016–17 Regional One Day Cup.

== See also ==
- List of cricket grounds in Pakistan
