= Shah Faisal (cricketer) =

Pakistani cricketer (born 1996)

Personal information
- Born: 20 September 1996 (age 30); Bannu, Pakistan
- Source: Cricinfo, 15 December 2015

Shah Faisal (born 20 September 1996) is a Pakistani cricketer who played for Peshawar. He made his first-class debut on 2 November 2015 in the 2015–16 Quaid-e-Azam Trophy. He made his List A debut on 24 January 2017 in the semi-final of the 2016–17 Regional One Day Cup.
