= Nadeem Sikander =

Pakistani cricketer (born 1985)

Personal information
- Born: 12 December 1985 (age 40)
- Source: Cricinfo, 22 October 2017

Nadeem Sikander (born 12 December 1985) is a Pakistani cricketer. He made his first-class debut for Rawalpindi in the 2003–04 Quaid-e-Azam Trophy on 12 April 2004. He made his List A debut for Rawalpindi in the 2018–19 Quaid-e-Azam One Day Cup on 6 September 2018.
