= Fazal-ur-Rehman (cricketer, born 1995) =

Pakistani cricketer (born 1995)

Personal information
- Born: 15 March 1995 (age 31)
- Source: ESPNcricinfo, 8 October 2018

Fazal-ur-Rehman (born 15 March 1995) is a Pakistani cricketer. He made his List A debut for Federally Administered Tribal Areas in the 2018–19 Quaid-e-Azam One Day Cup on 6 September 2018. He made his Twenty20 debut for Federally Administered Tribal Areas in the 2018–19 National T20 Cup on 15 December 2018.
