= Irfan Elahi =

Pakistani cricketer (born 1995)

Personal information
- Born: 23 September 1995 (age 31)
- Source: Cricinfo, 8 September 2018

Irfan Elahi (born 23 September 1995) is a Pakistani cricketer. He made his first-class debut for Khan Research Laboratories in the 2014–15 Quaid-e-Azam Trophy on 12 October 2014. He made his List A debut for Sui Northern Gas Pipelines Limited in the 2018–19 Quaid-e-Azam One Day Cup on 13 September 2018.
