= Ehtisham Sultan =

Pakistani cricketer (born 1998)

Ehtisham Sultan احتشام سلطان
Personal information
- Full name: Ehtisham Sultan
- Born: 17 March 1998 (age 28); Mansehra, Khyber Pakhtunkhwa, Pakistan
- Batting: Right-handed
- Bowling: Right-arm fast-medium
- Role: Bowler

Domestic team information
- Years: Team
- 2015: Abbottabad Falcons
- 2017: Lahore Qalandars

Career statistics
Competition	T20
Matches	2
Runs scored	0
Batting average	0.00
100s/50s	0/0
Top score	0*
Balls bowled	6
Wickets	0
Bowling average	–
5 wickets in innings	0
10 wickets in match	0
Best bowling	0/19
Catches/stumpings	0/–
- Source: ESPNcricinfo Cricket Archive, 13 June 2022

Ehtisham Sultan (Urdu: احتشام سلطان; Pashto: احتشام سلطان; born 17 April 1998) is a Pakistani cricketer.

== Domestic career ==
Sultan made his debut for Abbottabad Falcons against Rawalpindi Rams in the 2015 Super 8 Twenty20 Cup. He got a score of 0* and didn’t bowl as Rawalpindi won by 6 wickets. He played his next match against Peshawar Panthers in the 2015–16 National T20 Cup. He bowled for the first time in his career and got figures of 0/19 in 1 over. Abbottabad won the match by 6 wickets.
