= Nadir Shah (cricketer) =

Pakistani cricketer (born 2000)

Personal information
- Born: 2 October 2000 (age 26)
- Source: Cricinfo, 11 December 2018

Nadir Shah (born 2 October 2000) is a Pakistani cricketer. He made his Twenty20 debut for Karachi Whites in the 2018–19 National T20 Cup on 11 December 2018.
