= Majid Ali =

Pakistani cricketer (born 1994)

Personal information
- Born: 19 July 1994 (age 32); Okara, Punjab, Pakistan
- Batting: Right-handed
- Role: Bowler

Domestic team information
- Years: Team
- 2015: Multan Tigers
- Source: Cricinfo, 19 September 2020

Majid Ali is a Pakistani cricketer. He made his first-class debut for Multan Tigers in the 2014–15 Quaid-e-Azam Trophy on 12 October 2014. He made his Twenty20 debut for the Multan Tigers in the 2015 Haier Super 8 Twenty20 Cup on 12 May 2015.
