= Saif-ur-Rehman (cricketer, born 1998) =

Pakistani cricketer (born 1998)

Personal information
- Born: 21 December 1998 (age 27)
- Source: ESPNcricinfo, 11 September 2018

Saif-ur-Rehman (born 21 December 1998) is a Pakistani cricketer. He made his first-class debut for Multan in the 2018–19 Quaid-e-Azam Trophy on 8 September 2018. He made his List A debut for Multan in the 2018–19 Quaid-e-Azam One Day Cup on 13 September 2018.
