= Salahuddin (cricketer, born 1998) =

Pakistani cricketer (born 1998)

Personal information
- Born: 2 November 1998 (age 28)
- Source: Cricinfo, 6 September 2018

Salahuddin (born 2 November 1998) is a Pakistani cricketer. He made his List A debut for Zarai Taraqiati Bank Limited in the 2018–19 Quaid-e-Azam One Day Cup on 6 September 2018.
