= Ghulam Rehman =

Pakistani cricketer (born 1990)

Personal information
- Born: 8 October 1990 (age 36)
- Source: Cricinfo, 13 September 2018

Ghulam Rehman (born 8 October 1990) is a Pakistani cricketer. He made his List A debut for Multan in the 2018–19 Quaid-e-Azam One Day Cup on 13 September 2018. He was the leading wicket-taker for Multan in the tournament, with fourteen dismissals in seven matches.
