= Mohammad Imran (cricketer, born 1990) =

Pakistani cricketer (born 1990)

Personal information
- Full name: Mohammad Imran Sadiq
- Born: 3 September 1990 (age 36)
- Source: Cricinfo, 11 December 2018

Mohammad Imran Sadiq (born 3 September 1990) is a Pakistani cricketer. He made his Twenty20 debut for Multan in the 2018–19 National T20 Cup on 11 December 2018.
