= Nihal Mansoor =

Pakistani cricketer (born 1993)

Personal information
- Full name: Nihal Mansoor
- Born: 14 November 1993 (age 32)
- Source: Cricinfo, 26 September 2017

Nihal Mansoor (born 14 November 1993) is a Pakistani cricketer, who plays mainly as a right-handed batsman. He made his first-class debut for Pakistan Television in the 2017–18 Quaid-e-Azam Trophy on 26 September 2017. He made his Twenty20 debut for Rawalpindi in the 2018–19 National T20 Cup on 23 December 2018. In March 2019, he was named in Federal Areas' squad for the 2019 Pakistan Cup.
