= Shahrukh Ali =

Pakistani cricketer (born 1996)

Personal information
- Born: 11 August 1996 (age 30); Lahore, Pakistan
- Source: Cricinfo, 28 September 2018

Shahrukh Ali (born 11 August 1996) is a Pakistani cricketer. He made his first-class debut for Zarai Taraqiati Bank Limited in the 2018–19 Quaid-e-Azam Trophy on 25 September 2018. He made his List A debut for Zarai Taraqiati Bank Limited in the 2018–19 Quaid-e-Azam One Day Cup on 30 September 2018.
