= Saddam Afridi =

Pakistani cricketer

Personal information
- Full name: Saddam Afridi
- Source: Cricinfo, 26 September 2017

Saddam Afridi is a Pakistani cricketer. He made his first-class debut for Federally Administered Tribal Areas in the 2017–18 Quaid-e-Azam Trophy on 26 September 2017. He made his List A debut for Multan in the 2018–19 Quaid-e-Azam One Day Cup on 6 September 2018.
