= Muzammil Shah =

Pakistani cricketer (born 1997)

Personal information
- Full name: Muzammil Shah
- Source: Cricinfo, 4 November 2017

Muzammil Shah (born 23 November 1997) is a Pakistani cricketer. He made his first-class debut for Islamabad in the 2017–18 Quaid-e-Azam Trophy on 2 November 2017. He made his List A debut for Islamabad in the 2018–19 Quaid-e-Azam One Day Cup on 13 September 2018.
