= 2015 Super 8 Twenty20 Cup =

2015 Haier Super 8 T20 Cup
- Administrator: Pakistan Cricket Board
- Cricket format: Twenty20
- Tournament format(s): Round-robin and knockout
- Champions: Sialkot Stallions (2nd title)
- Participants: 8
- Matches: 15
- Most runs: Nauman Anwar (270)
- Most wickets: Usama Mir (11)

The Super 8 T20 Cup 2015 was the fourth season of the Haier Super 8 T20 Cup. The Twenty20 tournament was played from May 11 to 18, 2015, at the Iqbal Stadium in Faisalabad.

Sialkot Stallions won the tournament, defeating Lahore Lions by 74 runs in the final.

== Venue ==
All the matches in the tournament were played at Iqbal Stadium, Faisalabad.

City	Venue	Capacity	Matches
Faisalabad, Punjab	Iqbal Stadium	25,000	15
2015 Super 8 Twenty20 Cup is located in Pakistan

== Teams ==
- Abbottabad Falcons captain : Junaid Khan
- Faisalabad Wolves captain : Misbah Ul Haq
- Karachi Dolphins captain : Mohammad Sami
- Lahore Lions captain : Kamran Akmal
- Multan Tigers captain : Gulraiz Sadaf
- Peshawar Panthers captain : Zohaib Khan
- Rawalpindi Rams captain : Sohail Tanveer
- Sialkot Stallions captain : Shoaib Malik

== Fixtures and results ==
All times shown are in Pakistan Standard Time (UTC+05).

=== Group stage ===
==== Group A ====
Points Table

Team	Pld	W	L	NR	NRR	Pts
Sialkot Stallions	3	2	1	0	+1.365	4
Rawalpindi Rams	3	2	1	0	+0.685	4
Peshawar Panthers	3	2	1	0	+0.027	4
Abbottabad Falcons	3	0	3	0	-2.167	0

11 May
17:00 (D/N)
Scorecard

Abbottabad Falcons; 109 (19.1 overs)	v	Rawalpindi Rams; 110/4 (17 overs)
Fakhar Zaman 46 (37); Hammad Azam 4/12 (3 overs)		Naved Malik 39 (25); Kamran Ghulam 2/21 (4 overs)

Rawalpindi Rams won by 6 wickets
Iqbal Stadium, Faisalabad
Umpires: Nadeem Iqbal and Qaiser Waheed
Player of the match: Hammad Azam (Rawalpindi Rams)

- Rawalpindi Rams won the toss and elected to field
- Ehtisham Sultan and Mohammad Naseem (Abbottabad Falcons); Tayyab Riaz (Rawalpindi Rams)

11 May
21:00 (D/N)
Scorecard

Peshawar Panthers; 166/6 (20 overs)	v	Sialkot Stallions; 169/3 (18.1 overs)
Israrullah 59 (45); Umaid Asif 2/35 (4 overs)		Shoaib Malik 95* (49); Imran Khan Jr. 2/18 (4 overs)

Sialkot Stallions won by 7 wickets
Iqbal Stadium, Faisalabad
Umpires: Zameer Haider and Asif Yaqoob
Player of the match: Shoaib Malik (Sialkot Stallions)

- Peshawar Panthers won the toss and elected to bat
- Ahmed Butt, Nauman Anwar and Sultan Ahmed (Sialkot Stallions)

13 May
17:00 (D/N)
Scorecard

Abbottabad Falcons; 178/4 (20 overs)	v	Peshawar Panthers; 182/4 (19 overs)
Sajjad Ali 52 (35); Imran Khan 1/30 (4 overs)		Rafatullah Mohmand 78 (34); Junaid Khan 1/19 (3 overs)

Peshawar Panthers won by 6 wickets
Iqbal Stadium, Faisalabad
Umpires: Zameer Haider and Tahir Rasheed
Player of the match: Rafatullah Mohmand (Peshawar Panthers)

- Abbottabad Falcons won the toss and elected to bat

13 May
21:00 (D/N)
Scorecard

Rawalpindi Rams; 152 (20 overs)	v	Sialkot Stallions; 127/9 (20 overs)
Khurram Shehzad 32 (33); Bilawal Bhatti 4/27 (4 overs)		Ayaz Tasawwar 64* (50); Mohammad Asghar 3/29 (4 overs)

Rawalpindi Rams won by 25 runs
Iqbal Stadium, Faisalabad
Umpires: Ghaffar Kazmi and Mohammad Sajid
Player of the match: Mohammad Asghar (Rawalpindi Rams)

- Sialkot Stallions won the toss and elected to field

15 May
17:00 (D/N)
Scorecard

Peshawar Panthers; 147/6 (19.2 overs)	v	Rawalpindi Rams; 145/6 (20 overs)
Adil Amin 53 (44); Mohammad Asghar 1/18 (4 overs)		Naved Malik 57 (40); Imran Khan Jr. 3/13 (4 overs)

Peshawar Panthers won by 7 wkts.
Iqbal Stadium, Faisalabad
Umpires: Mohammad Asif and Tahir Hussain
Player of the match: Adil Amin (Peshawar Panthers) and Imran Khan (cricketer, born 1988) (Peshawar Panthers)

- Peshawar Panthers won the toss and elected to field

15 May
21:00 (D/N)
Scorecard

Abbottabad Falcons; 153 (17.3 overs)	v	Sialkot Stallions; 240/4 (20 overs)
Junaid Khan 36 (17); Usama Mir 4/24(4)		Bilal Asif 114 (48); Junaid Khan 2/60 (4 overs)

Sialkot Stallions won by 87 runs.
Iqbal Stadium, Faisalabad
Umpires: Shozab Raza and Ahsan Raza
Player of the match: Bilal Asif (Sialkot Stallions)

- Abbottabad Falcons, who chose to field

==== Group B ====
Points Table

Team	Pld	W	L	NR	NRR	Pts
Lahore Lions	3	2	0	1	+1.500	5
Karachi Dolphins	3	2	0	1	+1.223	3
Faisalabad Wolves	3	1	2	0	-1.036	2
Multan Tigers	3	0	3	0	-0.896	0

12 May
17:00 (D/N)
Scorecard

Faisalabad Wolves; 183/6 (20 overs)	v	Multan Tigers; 139/6 (16.3 overs)
Misbah-ul-Haq 67* (27); Majid Ali 2/38 (4 overs)		Naved Yasin 69*(31); Mohammad Talha 3/23 (3 overs)

Faisalabad Wolves won by 7 runs (D/L method)
Iqbal Stadium, Faisalabad
Umpires: Ghaffar Kazmi and Mir Dad
Player of the match: Misbah-ul-Haq (Faisalabad Wolves)

- Faisalabad Wolves won the toss and elected to bat
- Multan Tigers innings was stopped by rain at 16.3 overs.

12 May
21:00 (D/N)
Scorecard

Karachi Dolphins	v	Lahore Lions

Match abandoned without a ball bowled
Iqbal Stadium, Faisalabad
Umpires: Asif Yaqoob and Majid Hussain

14 May
17:00 (D/N)
Scorecard

Karachi Dolphins; 149/3 (17 overs)	v	Multan Tigers; 147/9 (20 overs)
Sarfaraz Ahmed 50* (40); Aamer Yamin 2/10 (2 overs)		Aamer Yamin 47 (35); Mohammad Sami 2/23 (4 overs)

Karachi Dolphins won by 7 wickets
Iqbal Stadium, Faisalabad
Umpires: Ahmed Shahab and Mohammad Asif
Player of the match: Sarfraz Ahmed (Karachi Dolphins)

- Karachi Dolphins won the toss and elected to field
- Twenty20 debuts: Ahsan Jamil (Karachi Dolphins); Yasir Butt (Multan Tigers)

14 May
21:00 (D/N)
Scorecard

Faisalabad Wolves; 108 (19 overs)	v	Lahore Lions; 153/8 (20 overs)
Ali Shan 28* (27); Imran Ali 2/12 (3 overs)		Umar Akmal 85* (60); Samiullah Khan 2/38 (4 overs)

Lahore Lions won by 45 runs
Iqbal Stadium, Faisalabad
Umpires: Khalid Mahmood and Riazuddin
Player of the match: Umar Akmal (Lahore Lions)

- Lahore Lions won the toss and elected to bat
- Twenty20 debut: Sadaqat Ali (Faisalabad Wolves)

16 May
17:00 (D/N)
Scorecard

Lahore Lions; 180 (20 overs)	v	Multan Tigers; 165 (20 overs)
Umar Akmal 95* (49); Zulfiqar Babar 1/19 (3 overs)		Naved Yasin 68* (39); Aizaz Cheema 3/25 (4 overs)

Lahore Lions won by 15 runs
Iqbal Stadium, Faisalabad
Umpires: Khalid Mahmood and Riazuddin
Player of the match: Umar Akmal (Lahore Lions)

- Lahore Lions won the toss and elected to bat
- Twenty20 debuts: Mohammad Azeem and Sikander Khan (Multan Tigers)

16 May
21:00 (D/N)
Scorecard

Faisalabad Wolves; 144/9 (20 overs)	v	Karachi Dolphins; 147/4 (17.5 overs)
Jahandad Khan 54 (44); Mohammad Sami 3/19 (4 overs)		Shahzaib Hasan 59 (34); Sadaqat Ali 2/17 (4 overs)

Karachi Dolphins won by 6 wickets
Iqbal Stadium, Faisalabad
Umpires: Ahmed Shahab and Tahir Hussain
Player of the match: Shahzaib Hasan (Karachi Dolphins)

- Faisalabad Wolves won the toss and elected to bat
- Twenty20 debut: Fazal Subhan (Karachi Dolphins)

=== Knockout stage ===
Semifinals
A1	Sialkot Stallions	167 (19.4 ov)
B2	Karachi Dolphins	102 (17 overs)
B1	Lahore Lions	105/6 (19.1 ov)
A2	Rawalpindi Rams	100/8 (20 ov)

Final
A1	Sialkot Stallions	197/9 (20 ov)
B1	Lahore Lions	123/8 (20 ov)

==== Semi-finals ====
1st Semi-final

17 May
17:00 (D/N)
Scorecard

Sialkot Stallions; 167 (19.4 overs)	v	Karachi Dolphins; 102 (17 overs)
Nauman Anwar 80 (43); Faraz Ahmed 3/30 (4 overs)		Mohammad Waqas 29 (20); Usama Mir 3/16 (4 overs)

Sialkot Stallions won by 65 runs
Iqbal Stadium, Faisalabad
Umpires: Riazuddin and Tahir Hussain
Player of the match: Nauman Anwar (Sialkot Stallions)

- Karachi Dolphins won the toss and elected to field

2nd Semi-final

17 May
21:00 (D/N)
Scorecard

Lahore Lions; 105/6 (19.1 overs)	v	Rawalpindi Rams; 100/8 (20 overs)
Tayyab Riaz 22 (32); Aizaz Cheema 2/21 (4 overs)		Ahmed Shehzad 58* (57); Hammad Azam 2/15 (4 overs)

Lahore Lions won by 4 wickets
Iqbal Stadium, Faisalabad
Umpires: Ahmed Shahab and Ahsan Raza
Player of the match: Ahmed Shehzad (Lahore Lions)

- Rawalpindi Rams won the toss and elected to bat

==== Final ====
18 May
21:00 (D/N)
Scorecard

Lahore Lions; 123/8 (20 overs)	v	Sialkot Stallions; 197/9 (20 overs)
Umer Akmal 35 (30); Sultan Ahmed 2/16 (4 overs)		Nauman Anwar 97 (54); Aizaz Cheema 4/34 (4 overs)

Sialkot Stallions won by 74 runs
Iqbal Stadium, Faisalabad
Umpires: Ahsan Raza and Shozab Raza
Player of the match: Nauman Anwar (Sialkot Stallions)

- Sialkot Stallions won the toss and elected to bat
- Sialkot Stallions won the 2015 Cool & Cool Presents Haier Super8 T20 Cup
