= Ghulam Haider (cricketer) =

Pakistani cricketer (born 1997)

Personal information
- Born: 28 December 1997 (age 28); Quetta, Pakistan
- Batting: Right-handed
- Bowling: Right arm medium
- Source: Cricinfo, 19 April 2016

Ghulam Haider (born 28 December 1997) is a Pakistani cricketer. He made his List A debut on 19 April 2016 for Balochistan in the 2016 Pakistan Cup.
