= Saleem Burki =

Pakistani cricketer (born 1991)

Personal information
- Born: 14 April 1991 (age 35); Tank, Pakistan
- Source: ESPNcricinfo, 8 October 2016

Saleem Burki (born 14 April 1991) is a Pakistani cricketer. He made his first-class debut for Federally Administered Tribal Areas in the 2016–17 Quaid-e-Azam Trophy on 7 October 2016. He made his List A debut on 20 January 2017 for Federally Administered Tribal Areas in the 2016–17 Regional One Day Cup.
