= Hanif Mohammad Trophy =

- Administrator: Pakistan Cricket Board (PCB)
- Format: Non-first-class four-day
- First edition: 2023–24
- Latest edition: 2025
- Tournament format: Round-robin
- Number of teams: 12
- Current champion: Islamabad
- Most successful: Islamabad
- Qualification: Quaid-e-Azam Trophy
- Website: www.pcb.com.pk

The Hanif Mohammad Trophy is a cricket event arranged by the Pakistan Cricket Board (PCB), honoring Hanif Mohammad, a key figure in Pakistan's early cricket history. It's a way to pay homage to his skill, passion, and lasting impact on the sport.

== Format ==
The Hanif Mohammad Trophy is a four-day grade-II cricket tournament involving 10 regional teams during the domestic season. It acts as a stepping stone for regional teams to advance to the Quaid-e-Azam Trophy, the top-level first-class competition. The winning team of the Hanif Mohammad Trophy earns promotion to the Quaid-e-Azam Trophy, while the last-placed team in the first-class tournament is demoted to the grade-II event.

== Inaugural season (2023-24) ==
The first season of the Hanif Mohammad Trophy was held during the 2023-24 domestic cricket season.

=== Notable performances ===
- Abdul Wahid Bangalzai and Mohammad Ammar both scored centuries in one of the matches. On the day the tournament began.
- Jawad Ali from Hyderabad had an outstanding performance, taking an impressive seven-wicket haul and emerging as the star player of the day.

=== First round victories ===
- Islamabad and Bahawalpur emerged victorious in the first round of matches.
- Abbottabad and Quetta notched their first wins of the season.
