= Kashif Iqbal =

Pakistani cricketer (born 1997)

Personal information
- Born: 14 May 1997 (age 29)
- Source: Cricinfo, 1 September 2018

Kashif Iqbal (born 14 May 1997) is a Pakistani cricketer. He made his first-class debut for Karachi Whites in the 2018–19 Quaid-e-Azam Trophy on 1 September 2018. He made his List A debut for Karachi Whites in the 2018–19 Quaid-e-Azam One Day Cup on 6 September 2018.
