= Samiullah (Pakistani cricketer) =

Pakistani cricketer (born 1996)

Personal information
- Full name: Samiullah
- Born: 11 November 1996 (age 30)
- Source: Cricinfo, 4 October 2017

Samiullah (born 11 November 1996) is a Pakistani cricketer. He made his first-class debut for Federally Administered Tribal Areas in the 2017–18 Quaid-e-Azam Trophy on 3 October 2017. He made his List A debut for Federally Administered Tribal Areas in the 2017–18 Regional One Day Cup on 4 February 2018.

He made his Twenty20 debut also for Federally Administered Tribal Areas against Peshawar in the 2018–19 National T20 Cup on 11 December 2018. He was the leading run-scorer for Federally Administered Tribal Areas in the tournament, with 163 runs in seven matches.
