= Shahbaz Khan (cricketer) =

Pakistani cricketer (born 1991)

Personal information
- Full name: Shahbaz Jahan Khan
- Born: 9 July 1991 (age 35); Pishin, Balochistan, Pakistan
- Batting: Left-handed
- Bowling: Slow left-arm

Domestic team information
- Years: Team
- 2019–present: Balochistan

Career statistics
Competition	FC	LA
Matches	14	9
Runs scored	344	168
Batting average	16.38	33.60
100s/50s	–/1	–
Top score	61	8
Balls bowled	452	281
Wickets	2	5
Bowling average	128.50	38.00
5 wickets in innings	–	–
10 wickets in match	–	–
Best bowling	1/12	1/11
Catches/stumpings	2/–	1/–
- Source: Cricinfo, 30 December 2019

Shahbaz Khan (Urdu: شہباز خان, born 9 July 1991) is a Pakistani first-class cricketer who plays for Balochistan cricket team. In September 2019, he was named in Balochistan's squad for the 2019–20 Quaid-e-Azam Trophy tournament.
