= Waqar Hussain =

Pakistani cricketer (born 1993)

Personal information
- Born: 12 September 1993 (age 33); Okara, Punjab, Pakistan
- Source: Cricinfo, 6 September 2018

Waqar Hussain (born 12 September 1993) is a Pakistani cricketer. He made his first-class debut for Multan in the 2013–14 Quaid-e-Azam Trophy on 23 October 2013. He made his Twenty20 debut for Multan in the 2018–19 National T20 Cup on 16 December 2018. In March 2019, he was named in Baluchistan's squad for the 2019 Pakistan Cup.
