= Asim Ali =

Pakistani cricketer (born 1996)

Personal information
- Born: 18 February 1996 (age 30); Lahore, Pakistan
- Source: ESPNcricinfo, 2 October 2016

Asim Ali (born 18 February 1996) is a Pakistani cricketer. He made his first-class debut for Lahore Blues in the 2016–17 Quaid-e-Azam Trophy on 1 October 2016. He made his List A debut for Lahore Whites in the 2018–19 Quaid-e-Azam One Day Cup on 6 September 2018.
