= Jibran Khan =

Pakistani cricketer (born 1989)

Personal information
- Born: 31 December 1989 (age 36)
- Source: Cricinfo, 8 October 2018

Jibran Khan (born 31 December 1989) is a Pakistani cricketer. He made his first-class debut for Peshawar in the 2007–08 Quaid-e-Azam Trophy on 1 November 2007.
