= Zia-ul-Haq (Pakistani cricketer) =

Pakistani cricketer (born 1994)

Personal information
- Born: 11 December 1994 (age 31); Vehari, Punjab, Pakistan
- Batting: Right-handed
- Bowling: Left-arm fast-medium
- Role: Bowler

Domestic team information
- Years: Team
- 2010/11–2011/12: Pakistan International Airlines
- 2018–2019: Khyber Pakhtunkhwa
- 2019: Federal Areas
- 2019–2023: Southern Punjab
- 2023-present: Texas Super Kings
- Source: ESPNCricinfo, 6 December 2022

Zia-ul-Haq (Punjabi, Urdu: ضیاء الحق; born 11 December 1994) is a Pakistani cricketer who plays as a left-arm fast bowler. He has been selected for Pakistan Under-19 cricket team. He has played first-class, List A, Twenty20, Under-19 ODI, Quaid-e-Azam Trophy and miscellaneous matches. He was named in Pakistan's Twenty20 International squad for their tour of Sri Lanka in July 2015.

In April 2018, he was named in Khyber Pakhtunkhwa's squad for the 2018 Pakistan Cup. He was the leading wicket-taker for Khyber Pakhtunkhwa in the tournament, with eleven dismissals in four matches. In March 2019, he was named in Federal Areas' squad for the 2019 Pakistan Cup.
