= Muhammad Zaid =

Pakistani cricketer (born 1999)

Personal information
- Full name: Muhammad Zaid Alam
- Born: 24 December 1999 (age 26); Lahore, Pakistan
- Batting: Right-handed
- Source: Cricinfo, 13 September 2018

Muhammad Zaid Alam (Urdu محمد زید عالم born 24 December 1999) is a Pakistani cricketer. He made his List A debut for Lahore Whites against National Bank in the 2018–19 Quaid-e-Azam One Day Cup on 13 September 2018. Prior to his List A debut, he was named in Pakistan's squad for the 2018 Under-19 Cricket World Cup.

He made his Twenty20 debut for Lahore Blues in the 2018–19 National T20 Cup on 10 December 2018.
