= Gauhar Ali =

Pakistani cricketer (born 1989)

Personal information
- Born: 5 May 1989 (age 37); Nowshera District, Pakistan
- Source: Cricinfo, 1 November 2015

Gauhar Ali (born 5 May 1989) is a Pakistani cricketer who plays for Peshawar. He made 145 not out in the final of the 2016–17 Regional One Day Cup and was jointly named man of the match along with Iftikhar Ahmed.

In April 2018, he was named in Sindh's squad for the 2018 Pakistan Cup. He was the leading run-scorer for Peshawar in the 2018–19 Quaid-e-Azam One Day Cup, with 258 runs in seven matches.
