= Haider Ali (cricketer, born 1997) =

Pakistani cricketer (born 1997)

Personal information
- Born: 2 January 1997 (age 29); Lahore, Punjab, Pakistan
- Role: Batsman
- Source: ESPNcricinfo, 21 December 2015

Haider Ali (born 2 January 1997) is a Pakistani cricketer who has played for Lahore. He made his first-class debut for Lahore Shalimar in the 2013–14 Quaid-e-Azam Trophy on 10 December 2018.
