= Moazzam Malik (cricketer) =

Pakistani cricketer (born 1994)

Personal information
- Born: 3 October 1994 (age 31)
- Batting: Right-handed
- Bowling: Right-arm leg break
- Source: Cricinfo, 4 November 2017

Moazzam Malik (born 3 October 1994) is a Pakistani cricketer. He made his first-class debut for Karachi Whites in the 2017–18 Quaid-e-Azam Trophy on 2 November 2017. He made his List A debut for Karachi Whites in the 2018–19 Quaid-e-Azam One Day Cup on 24 October 2018.
