= Hayatullah (Pakistani cricketer) =

Pakistani cricketer (born 2000)

Personal information
- Born: 28 July 2000 (age 26)
- Source: ESPNcricinfo, 22 April 2016

Hayatullah (born 28 July 2000) is a Pakistani cricketer. He made his List A debut on 22 April 2016 for Khyber Pakhtunkhwa in the 2016 Pakistan Cup. He made his first-class debut for Federally Administered Tribal Areas in the 2018–19 Quaid-e-Azam Trophy on 11 October 2018.
