= Jamal Anwar =

Pakistani cricketer (born 1990)

Personal information
- Full name: Jamal Anwar
- Born: 31 December 1990 (age 35); West Ridge, Rawalpindi, Punjab, Pakistan
- Batting: Right-handed
- Role: Wicket-keeper batsman

Domestic team information
- Years: Team
- 2008–: Rawalpindi & Rawalpindi Rams
- 2008–2008: Federal Areas
- 2013–2014: Habib Bank
- Source: ESPNCricinfo, 3 August 2014

Jamal Anwar (born 31 December 1990) is a Pakistani First-class cricketer. He is a wicketkeeper-batsman who bats right-handed. He has represented Rawalpindi Rams, Federal Areas & Habib Bank in domestic cricket. He has played for Pakistan Under-19 and Pakistan Under-25.

In January 2021, Anwar was named in Northern's squad for the 2020–21 Pakistan Cup.
