= Kamran Afzal =

Pakistani cricketer (born 1997)

Personal information
- Born: 28 February 1997 (age 29); Lahore, Pakistan
- Batting: Left-handed
- Bowling: Left-arm orthodox spin
- Role: Bowler

Domestic team information
- Years: Team
- 2010–2017: Lahore
- 2017: Ghani Glass
- 2019: Higher Education Commission
- 2020–present: Central Punjab
- Source: ESPNcricinfo, 20 January 2017

Kamran Afzal (born 28 February 1997) is a Pakistani cricketer.

Afzal represented Lahore in age-group cricket from under-16s in 2010, through under-19s from 2012 to 2014, to senior cricket in 2015. He played three of out of five matches for Pakistan under-19s against Kenya on a tour of Kenya in December 2014. In 2015, he played inter-district cricket in Lahore, and was selected in the Pakistan under-19 squad that toured Sri Lanka in October; he played in the first of the two Test matches, and the first three of the five ODIs.

Afzal made his List A debut for Lahore Whites on 20 January 2017 in the 2016–17 Regional One Day Cup. He later played Grade‑II cricket in the Patron's Trophy, for Ghani Glass in 2017 and Higher Education Commission in 2019. Following the restructuring of domestic cricket in Pakistan in 2019, he has played for Central Punjab, mostly appearing in the second XI competitions. He made his second List A appearance in January 2021, for Central Punjab against Baluchistan in the Pakistan Cup.
