= Haris Bashir =

Pakistani cricketer (born 1993)

Personal information
- Born: 28 May 1993 (age 33)
- Source: Cricinfo, 30 September 2018

Haris Bashir (born 28 May 1993) is a Pakistani cricketer. He made his List A debut for Lahore Whites in the 2018–19 Quaid-e-Azam One Day Cup on 30 September 2018.
