= Farmanullah Khan =

Pakistani cricketer (born 1996)

Personal information
- Born: 2 February 1996 (age 30); Islamabad, Pakistan
- Source: Cricinfo, 27 September 2018

Farmanullah Khan (born 2 February 1996) is a Pakistani cricketer. He made his first-class debut for Islamabad in the 2018–19 Quaid-e-Azam Trophy on 25 September 2018. He made his List A debut for Islamabad in the 2018–19 Quaid-e-Azam One Day Cup on 8 October 2018.
