= Israr Ahmed (cricketer) =

Pakistani cricketer (born 1999)

Personal information
- Born: 2 May 1999 (age 27); Karachi, Pakistan
- Source: Cricinfo, 19 September 2018

Israr Ahmed (born 2 May 1999) is a Pakistani cricketer. He made his first-class debut for Karachi Whites in the 2018–19 Quaid-e-Azam Trophy on 16 September 2018. He made his List A debut for Karachi Whites in the 2018–19 Quaid-e-Azam One Day Cup on 30 September 2018.
