= Qaiser Ashraf =

Pakistani cricketer (born 1994)

Personal information
- Born: 8 May 1994 (age 32); Lahore, Pakistan
- Source: ESPNcricinfo, 9 September 2016

Qaiser Ashraf (born 8 May 1994) is a Pakistani cricketer who plays for Lahore. He was the leading wicket-taker for Lahore Whites in the 2018–19 Quaid-e-Azam One Day Cup, with sixteen dismissals in five matches. In March 2019, he was named in Baluchistan's squad for the 2019 Pakistan Cup.
