= Israr Ahmad =

Indian theoretical nuclear physicist (born 1940)

- Born: 19 December 1940; Mahuwara, Uttar Pradesh, India
- Died: 2 April 2010 (aged 69); New Delhi, India
- Occupations: Physicist, Professor, Fiction writer, Editor

Israr Ahmad (19 December 1940 – 2 April 2010) was an Indian theoretical nuclear physicist and professor at the Aligarh Muslim University since 1961. He was known for his work in quantum scattering theory.

He was an associate member of the International Centre for Theoretical Physics located in Trieste (Italy), a member of the New York Academy of Sciences, and the Indian Physics Association. He was founding director of the Center for Promotion of Science at the Aligarh Muslim University from its inception in 1985 to 1991, and chairman of its Department of Physics from 1988 to 1991. He was editor of the monthly Urdu journal Tahzibul Akhlaq of Aligarh Muslim University from June 1986 to 1990. In addition, he had served as professor at the King Abdul Aziz University in Jeddah (Saudi Arabia).

== Early life and education ==
Israr was born in Mahuwara village of Azamgarh district in a Zamindar family. He graduated from Shibli National College, Azamgarh in 1959 where he received his Intermediate and B.Sc. Physics degree. He was awarded the gold medal by the Gorakhpur University in 1959 for standing first in his B.Sc. examination. He received his M.Sc. Physis degree at the Aligarh Muslim University (AMU) in 1961, and was awarded the F.D. Murad Medal for standing first in his M.Sc. examination. He started his Ph.D. in the Department of Physics, AMU, under supervision of Prof. Mohd. Zillur Rahman Khan but submitted it as a Teacher candidate in 1969.

== Centre for Promotion of Science (CPS) ==
Apart from his scientific work, Ahmad was keen in spreading the message of Islamic reformer Syed Ahmad Khan. He was one of the strong supporters of the Aligarh Movement and revived the mission of Sir Syed to promote modern education, especially science, among oriental students and seminaries. To achieve this, with the support of Dr. Abdus Salam, he established the Centre for Promotion of Science (CPS) at Aligarh Muslim University in 1985, and was appointed as founder director of the center.

The center played a key role as a bridge between the Madrasa and a modern institution. It organized several refresher courses, seminars, series of lectures for Madrasa students and seminaries. In these, Ahmad organized a number of conferences on 'Religious Seminaries and Science Education', and conducted several introductory science courses for the teachers of Muslim religious seminaries. He established an independent office of CPS next to the Department of Physics and Dean Faculty of Science. He served CPS until 1991 and handed over his post to his student Prof. Abdul Qaiyum.

== Tahzibul Akhlaq ==
In 1864 Sir Syed Ahmed Khan started the Urdu journal Tahzibul Akhlaq to spread awareness of contemporary socio-economic and educational developments in the Muslim community. Tahzibul Akhlaq was discontinued in 1881, but 100 years later, his ardent supporter, the then vice-chancellor Syed Hamid, revived it in 1981. Ahmad took an interest in the project and its promotion and was appointed its editor in June 1986, taking over this position from Prof. Noorul Hasan Naqvi. He played a key role in making Tahzibul Akhlaq a viable journal. As a science fiction writer in Hindi, Urdu, and English, Ahmad wrote several articles in different journals. He served as the editor of Tahzibul Akhlaq until 1990, when he handed over the post to Prof. Kabir Ahmad Jaisi.

== Death ==
Ahmad died on 2 April 2010 at Holy Family Hospital in New Delhi. His body was brought to Aligarh and was buried at the Aligarh Muslim University Graveyard. He left behind his wife Mahe Laka (daughter of Dr. Qammrudeen), sons Shahid Israr and Khalid Israr, and daughters Sabiha Alvi and Sobia Wahid.

== See also ==
- List of physicists
- List of theoretical physicists
- String Theory
- Theory of everything
- Unified Field Theory
