= Nauman Anwar =

Pakistani cricketer

Personal information
- Full name: Nauman Anwar
- Born: 12 October 1995 (age 31); Gujranwala, Punjab, Pakistan
- Batting: Right-handed
- Bowling: Right-arm medium-fast
- Role: Opening batsman

International information
- National side: Pakistan (2015)
- Only T20I (cap 63): 24 May 2015 v Zimbabwe

Domestic team information
- Years: Team
- 2014–2015: Sialkot Stallions
- 2016: Karachi Kings
- 2023-present: Seattle Orcas

Career statistics
Competition	FC	LA	T20
Matches	8	3	12
Runs scored	465	47	417
Batting average	31.00	15.66	37.90
100s/50s	1/1	0/0	0/4
Top score	199	34	97
Balls bowled	106	–	–
Wickets	2	–	–
Bowling average	36.50	–	–
5 wickets in innings	0	–	–
10 wickets in match	0	–	–
Best bowling	2/44	–	–
Catches/stumpings	6/–	2/1	5/–
- Source: ESPNcricinfo, 10 December 2013

Nauman Anwar (born 12 October 1995) is a Pakistani cricketer. He represents Sialkot Stallions in domestic cricket. He was leading scorer (270) in his debut 2015 Haier Super 8 T20 Cup. He had played just 4 First-class, 3 List A and 5 Twenty20 games before being selected in the Pakistan squad for the Zimbabwe series in 2015.

He made his Twenty20 International debut for Pakistan against Zimbabwe in Lahore on 24 May 2015 and scored a whirlwind 18 off 10 balls.

He was the leading run-scorer for Lahore Whites in the 2018–19 Quaid-e-Azam One Day Cup, with 286 runs in seven matches. Now he plays in the United States for the Seattle Orcas.
