= Sadaif Mehdi =

Pakistani cricketer (born 1994)

Personal information
- Born: 14 August 1994 (age 32)
- Source: Cricinfo, 13 September 2018

Sadaif Mehdi (born 14 August 1994) is a Pakistani cricketer. He made his first-class debut for Multan in the 2013–14 Quaid-e-Azam Trophy on 23 October 2013.
