= Arsal Sheikh =

Pakistani cricketer (born 1997)

Personal information
- Full name: Mohammad Arsal Sheikh
- Born: 22 January 1997 (age 29); Islamabad, Pakistan
- Batting: Right-handed
- Bowling: Right-arm off break
- Source: ESPNcricinfo, 5 May 2016

Arsal Sheikh (born 22 January 1997) is a Pakistani cricketer. He made his List A debut on 28 April 2016 for Islamabad in the 2016 Pakistan Cup. Prior to his debut, he was named in Pakistan's squad for the 2016 Under-19 Cricket World Cup. He made his Twenty20 debut on 31 August 2016 for Lahore Whites in the 2016–17 Cool & Cool Present Jazz National T20 Cup. He made his first-class debut for Islamabad in the 2016–17 Quaid-e-Azam Trophy on 22 October 2016.

The son of influential PCB official Shakeel Sheikh, his selection in both the national U-19 team in 2016 and, more recently, the Islamabad squad during the Regional One Day Cup in 2016/2017, despite the lukewarm domestic performances, have pushed many analysts to talk of nepotism.
