= Federal Areas cricket team =

Cricket team

Federal Areas was a first-class cricket team in Pakistan based in the capital, Islamabad. Between 2008 and 2012 they played 16 first-class matches in four seasons of the Pentangular Cup. Their home ground was the Diamond Club Ground in Islamabad.

== Background ==
When the Pakistan Cricket Board revamped the Pentangular Cup for the 2007–08 season, they created the Federal Areas team to make a fifth competitor alongside the teams from the four provinces. In order to make the competition even, "the Pakistan Cricket Board selected the top 75 Quaid-e-Azam players plus 20 juniors and divided them [among the five teams], mostly on a regional basis but reallocating some to strengthen the weaker sides." Few of the Federal Areas players were actually from the Islamabad area.

== Playing record ==
Federal Areas' best season was their first, when they finished second with two wins and two draws. They hit their highest score, 597 for 8 declared, in an innings victory over Baluchistan, and won their last match, against Sindh in their first match at the Diamond Club Ground, by chasing down a target of 322 with one wicket in hand.

They came fourth with one victory in 2008–09, third with one victory in 2011–11, and fourth with no victories in 2011–12. Overall, of their 16 matches they won 4, lost 4 and drew 8.

== Leading players ==
Federal Areas' highest scorer, with 788 runs in 11 matches at an average of 52.53, is Bazid Khan, who also hit the highest score of 172 against Baluchistan in 2007–08. The best innings bowling figures are 7 for 21 by Sohail Tanvir against Baluchistan in 2008–09, and he also took the most wickets, 56 in 10 matches at 23.75. The best match bowling figures are 10 for 79 (5 for 34 and 5 for 45) by Nasrullah Khan against Khyber Pakhtunkhwa in 2010–11. There were five captains: Shoaib Akhtar, Naved Ashraf (who made 519 runs at 39.92), Iftikhar Anjum (31 wickets at 21.93), Bazid Khan and Sohail Tanvir.

Apart from Iftikhar Anjum and Nasrullah Khan, the other notable Federal Areas player from Islamabad is Raheel Majeed, who made 650 runs in 11 matches at 32.50.

== Pentangular One-Day Cup ==
A 50-over List A competition was held among the five provincial teams in 2008-09 and 2009–10. In 2008-09 the Federal Areas Leopards came second after the round-robin and played off in the final against the first-placed Punjab Stallions, losing by eight wickets. The Federal Areas Leopards came third in 2009–10. Shoaib Akhtar is Federal Areas' leading wicket-taker in List A matches with 19 wickets, including 6 for 52 against Khyber Pakhtunkhwa Panthers in 2009–10. Umar Amin is Federal Areas' leading batsman, with 449 runs at 79.83.
