= 2016 Pakistan Super League players draft =

PSL player drafts

The player draft for the inaugural season of the Pakistan Super League was held at Gaddafi Stadium, Lahore on 21–22 December 2015. A total of 308 players and 30 coaches, including Pakistanis and foreigners were divided into 5 different categories: Platinum, Diamond, Gold, Silver and Emerging. Each franchise had a salary-spending cap of $1.2 million, including the signing of players, coaches and support staff. There were five icon players and each team was allowed to pick one icon and six foreigners in a 20-man squad (16 active and 4 supplementary).

== Players picked ==
Following is the list of players picked by different teams.

Shahid Afridi was the first player to be picked in the draft. Shane Watson was the first foreign player to be picked in the draft. Players were paid according to their categories:

Icon - $200,000, Platinum - $140,000, Diamond - $70,000, Gold - $50,000, Silver - $25,000, Emerging - $10,000

Category	Islamabad United	Karachi Kings	Lahore Qalandars	Peshawar Zalmi	Quetta Gladiators
Icon	Shane Watson	Shoaib Malik	Chris Gayle	Shahid Afridi	Kevin Pietersen
Platinum	Misbah Ul Haq; Andre Russell	Sohail Tanvir; Shakib Al Hasan	Umar Akmal; Dwayne Bravo	Wahab Riaz; Darren Sammy	Sarfaraz Ahmed; Ahmed Shehzad
Diamond	Mohammad Irfan; Samuel Badree; Brad Haddin	Imad Wasim; Lendl Simmons; Ravi Bopara	Sohaib Maqsood; Muhammad Rizwan; Yasir Shah	Mohammad Hafeez; Kamran Akmal; Chris Jordan	Anwar Ali; Luke Wright; Jason Holder
Gold	Khalid Latif; Mohammad Sami; Sharjeel Khan	Bilawal Bhatti; Mohammad Amir; James Vince	Cameron Delport; Kevon Cooper; Mustafizur Rahman	Junaid Khan; Jim Allenby; Tamim Iqbal	Umar Gul; Zulfiqar Babar; Elton Chigumbura
Silver	Umar Amin; Kamran Ghulam; Imran Khalid; Babar Azam; Sam Billings	Sohail Khan; Usama Mir; Nauman Anwar; Iftikhar Ahmed; Mushfiqur Rahim	Azhar Ali; Zohaib Khan; Zia Ul Haq; Hammad Azam; Zafar Gohar	Abdur Rehman; Shahid Yousaf; Imran Khan Jr; Aamer Yamin; Dawid Malan	Asad Shafiq; Saad Nasim; Mohammad Nawaz; Bilal Asif; Mohammad Nabi
Emerging	Rumman Raees; Amad Butt	Saifullah Bangash; Mir Hamza	Adnan Rasool; Naved Yasin	Hassan Ali; Musadiq Ahmed	Bismillah Khan; Akbar Ur Rehman
Supplementary	Ashar Zaidi; Saeed Ajmal; Hussain Talat; Umar Siddiq	Shahzaib Hasan; Fawad Alam; TM Dilshan	Mukhtar Ahmed; Abdul Razzaq; Ehsan Adil; Imran Butt	Taj Wali; Israrullah; Brad Hodge; Mohammad Asghar	Rameez Raja Jr; Aizaz Cheema; Kumar Sangakkara

Supplementary players are those who picked by their team as extra players and their contracts will start only after they join their teams when one of the main team player gets injured or is unavailable to play.

== Post-draft signings ==
These players were signed by franchises after the draft.

Player	Team	Post- Draft Category
Dwayne Smith	IU	Platinum
Nathan McCullum	QG	Platinum
Ryan ten Doeschate	KK	Diamond
Ajantha Mendis	LQ	Diamond
Shaun Tait	PZ	Diamond
Grant Elliott	QG	Diamond
Azhar Mahmood	IU	Diamond
Owais Shah	KK	Gold
Riki Wessels	KK	Silver
Jonny Bairstow	PZ	Silver
