= 2017 Pakistan Super League =

2nd edition of the Pakistan Super League

HBL Pakistan Super League 2017
- Dates: 9 February – 5 March 2017
- Administrator: PCB
- Cricket format: Twenty20
- Tournament format(s): Double round-robin and playoffs
- Hosts: UAE; Pakistan
- Champions: Peshawar Zalmi (1st title)
- Runners-up: Quetta Gladiators
- Participants: 5
- Matches: 24
- Attendance: 219,876 (9,162 per match)
- Player of the series: Kamran Akmal (PZ) (353 runs)
- Most runs: Kamran Akmal (PZ) (353)
- Most wickets: Sohail Khan (KK) (16)
- Official website: psl-t20.com

The 2017 Pakistan Super League, also known as PSL 2 and branded as HBL PSL 2017, was the second edition of the Pakistan Super League, a professional Twenty20 cricket league established by the Pakistan Cricket Board (PCB). On 19 October 2016, at the 2017 player draft, league chairman Najam Sethi announced that the final of the 2017 tournament might be played in Lahore, Pakistan, depending on the security situation there. The PCB confirmed it was their intention to play the final in Lahore in January 2017 with players being flown into and out of Pakistan during a short window either side of the final. The Umpire Decision Review System (DRS) was used in play-off matches. The defending champions Islamabad United were eliminated in the first Eliminator. The 2017 PSL was broadcast in more than 10 territories. According to Najam Sethi, ratings were higher than the previous season.

The final was held in Lahore on 5 March and saw Peshawar Zalmi defeating Quetta Gladiators by 58 runs to win the championship. Darren Sammy of Peshawar Zalmi was awarded the man of the match award. Kamran Akmal, also of Peshawar Zalmi, was named the player of the tournament for scoring the highest aggregate of runs in PSL 2017.

The tournament also witnessed a spot-fixing controversy. As a result of this, four players were banned for differing periods of time.

== Background ==
Before the 2017 Pakistan Super League players draft in October 2016, league chairman Najam Sethi announced that the league hoped to hold the 2017 final in Lahore, Pakistan, with the agreement of Punjab Government officials. In the league's first season, all matches, including the final, were held in the UAE for security reasons. Sethi claimed the league had signed foreign players on the condition that if their team reached the final, they would have to travel to Lahore. Agents rebutted this claim saying their clients had agreed that they would only travel to play the final in Pakistan if the security advice prior to the final was favourable. They could not be forced to travel there. A PSL team official said security would need to be "extremely high", adding that "cash incentives" had been offered to foreign players to agree to travel to Lahore, although no action would be taken against any player who refused to do so. In August 2016, Sethi had stated that if players were unwilling to travel that teams could pick from a pool of foreign players from other teams who had agreed to do so, and that the Pakistan Cricket Board (PCB) could organise "foolproof security" for the event.

== Ceremonies ==
=== Opening ceremony ===
The league's opening ceremony, hosted by actor Fahad Mustafa, was held in Dubai at the Dubai International Cricket Stadium, on 9 February 2017. Defending Champions Islamabad United marched into the stadium in traditional shalwar kameez. The ceremony featured Pakistani cultural performances; and spectacular flying drummers, followed by a live performance of the Jamaican pop star and singer Shaggy. Pakistani singers Shehzad Roy and Ali Zafar performed the league's anthems "Ballay Ballay" and "Ab Khel Jamay Ga" respectively. Over 26,000 people attended the ceremony in the stadium, which ended with a fireworks display.

=== Closing ceremony ===
The closing ceremony was held at Gaddafi Stadium in Lahore. Ayesha Omar and Ahmad Ali Butt hosted the event which featured live performances by Pakistani singers Ali Zafar, Faakhir Mehmood, Overload and Ali Azmat. A sold-out crowd of spectators enjoyed the closing ceremony. Before the ceremony, Najam Sethi claimed that viewership was higher than in the previous season.

== Player acquisition and salaries ==
The player draft for the 2017 season was held in Dubai on 19 October 2016. 414 players—both Pakistani and international—were divided into five different categories. Each franchise could pick a maximum of seven foreign players for their squads, which could have a maximum of 20 members. 100 players, including 34 foreigners, were picked during the draft.

=== Squads ===
Islamabad United	Peshawar Zalmi	Lahore Qalandars	Karachi Kings	Quetta Gladiators
Misbah-ul-Haq (c); Asif Ali; Shadab Khan; Ben Duckett; Zohaib Khan; Dwayne Smith; Steven Finn; Sam Billings (wk); Brad Haddin (wk); Nicholas Pooran (wk); Saeed Ajmal; Mohammad Irfan; Mohammad Sami; Samuel Badree; Rumman Raees; Amad Butt; Imran Khalid; Rafatullah Mohmand	Darren Sammy (c); Alex Hales; Dawid Malan; Haris Sohail; Hasan Ali; Iftikhar Ahmed; Imran Khan; Chris Jordan; Junaid Khan; Kamran Akmal (wk); Khushdil Shah; Mohammad Asghar; Mohammad Hafeez; Eoin Morgan; Samit Patel; Marlon Samuels; Shahid Afridi; Shakib Al Hasan; Sohaib Maqsood; Tamim Iqbal; Wahab Riaz; Irfan Khan	Brendon McCullum (c); Azhar Ali; Jason Roy; James Franklin; Cameron Delport; Grant Elliott; Fakhar Zaman; Bilawal Bhatti; Usman Qadir; Ghulam Mudassar; Saif Badar; Mohammad Rizwan (wk); Umar Akmal; Sunil Narine; Chris Green; Sohail Tanvir; Aamer Yamin; Zafar Gohar; Yasir Shah; Mohammad Irfan	Kumar Sangakkara (c)(wk); Shoaib Malik; Chris Gayle; Babar Azam; Shahzaib Hasan; Khurram Manzoor; Kashif Bhatti; Kieron Pollard; Ryan McLaren; Imad Wasim; Ravi Bopara; Mahela Jayawardene; Saifullah Bangash (wk); Sohail Khan; Mohammad Amir; Usman Khan; Rahat Ali; Usama Mir; Abrar Ahmed; Abdul Ameer; Hasan Mohsin; Ammad Alam	Sarfraz Ahmed (c)(wk); Ahmed Shehzad; Kevin Pietersen; Asad Shafiq; Rilee Rossouw; Saad Nasim; Mohammad Nawaz; Anwar Ali; Luke Wright; Mahmudullah; Mohammad Nabi; Bismillah Khan (wk); Mir Hamza; Zulfiqar Babar; Umar Gul; Thisara Perera; Tymal Mills; Nathan McCullum; Umar Amin; Noor Ali Zadran; Hasan Khan; Anamul Haque; Rayad Emrit; Elton Chigumbura; Morne van Wyk; Sean Ervine

Sharjeel Khan and Khalid Latif were both provisionally suspended under the PCB's Anti-Corruption Code as part of an ongoing investigation into an organisation's alleged attempts to corrupt the 2017 Pakistan Super League. Both batsmen had been sent home, and no replacements were named. The ICC's Anti-Corruption Unit backed the PCB's investigation.

== Teams ==
The 2017 season of the Pakistan Super League (PSL) featured five teams nominally representing major cities in Pakistan. The possibility of adding a sixth team to the league in 2017, perhaps representing Kashmir, had been discussed but was rejected by the middle of May 2016.

The teams playing in the 2017 season were the same five franchises which played in the 2016 season:

- Islamabad United
- Karachi Kings
- Lahore Qalandars
- Peshawar Zalmi
- Quetta Gladiators

== Venues ==
The Dubai International Cricket Stadium and the Sharjah Cricket Stadium in the United Arab Emirates were the venues used for all group stage matches in the tournament. In February 2017, PCB chairman Najam Sethi announced that the final would be played at the Gaddafi Stadium in Lahore, while the other playoff matches were held as scheduled in Sharjah and Dubai. Tickets were sold online for the Lahore PSL final, confirmed by a PCB official. A ticket booth was set up at the Gaddafi Stadium for those who did not wish to purchase tickets online.

On 19 October 2016, at the 2017 player draft, Najam Sethi announced that the final of the 2017 tournament might be played in Lahore, Pakistan, depending on the security situation there. The PCB confirmed that it was their intention to play the final in Lahore in January 2017 with players being flown into and out of Pakistan over a short window either side of the final. The board planned to replace overseas players who were unwilling to travel to Pakistan with their teams in a new draft to be held at the end of February for the final stage of the tournament, if necessary with Pakistani players.

Subsequently, the final was held at the Gaddafi Stadium in Lahore.

United Arab Emirates		Pakistan
Dubai	Sharjah	Lahore
Dubai International Cricket Stadium	Sharjah Cricket Association Stadium	Gaddafi Stadium
Capacity: 30,000	Capacity: 15,000	Capacity: 27,000
2017 Pakistan Super League is located in United Arab Emirates		Lahore is located in Pakistan

== Promotion and media coverage ==
The official anthem of PSL season II, "Ab Khel Jamay Ga" was released on 1 January 2017. It was written, composed and sung by Ali Zafar. Another anthem titled "Ballay Ballay", sung by Shehzad Roy, was released on 30 January 2017.

== Format ==
PSL Playoffs

Each team played every other team twice in the league stage of the tournament in a double round robin format. Following the group stage, the top four teams qualified for the playoff stage of the tournament.

The 2017 season of the PSL followed rules and regulations laid down by the International Cricket Council (ICC). In the group stage, two points were awarded for a win, one for a no result and none for a loss. In the event of tied scores after both teams had faced their quota of overs, a super over would be used to determine the match winner. In the group stage teams would be ranked on the following criteria:

1. Higher number of points
2. If equal, higher number of wins
3. If equal, fewest defeats
4. If still equal, the results of head-to-head meetings
5. If still equal, net run rate

If any play-off match finished with no result, a super over would be used to determine the winner. A tied super over or rain meant the team that finished higher in the league table progressed.

=== Points table ===
Pos	Team	Pld	W	L	NR	Pts	NRR
1	Peshawar Zalmi (C)	8	4	3	1	9	0.309
2	Quetta Gladiators (R)	8	4	3	1	9	0.166
3	Karachi Kings (3rd)	8	4	4	0	8	−0.098
4	Islamabad United (4th)	8	4	4	0	8	−0.139
5	Lahore Qalandars	8	3	5	0	6	−0.223

Source: ESPNcricinfo
- Top 4 teams qualified for the playoffs
- Advanced to Qualifier
- Advanced to Eliminator 1

Notes:

- C = Champions;
- R = Runner-up;
- (x) = Position at the end of the tournament;

== Spot-fixing controversy ==
A spot fixing scandal took place during the competition. Sharjeel Khan allegedly received 2 million Pakistani rupees to play two dot balls against Peshawar Zalmi. On 30 August 2017 Sharjeel was banned for a period of 5 years. While Khalid Latif was allegedly given bat grips by bookies to indicate that he would spot-fix. He was also accused of convincing three other players to participate in the fixing. Both were given bans of 5 years, while four other players Mohammad Irfan, Mohammad Nawaz, Nasir Jamshed and Shahzaib Hasan were given bans of 1 year, 2 months, 1 year, and 1 year respectively.

== League stage ==
The league stage of the competition ran from 9 February–5 March 2017. All matches were held in the United Arab Emirates.

=== Summary ===
==== Week 1 ====
In the first game of the season, the defending champions, Islamabad United, beat Peshawar Zalmi with the use of Duckworth–Lewis–Stern method (DLS) because of rain. (DLS is a mathematical formulation designed to calculate the target score for the team batting second in a limited overs cricket match interrupted by weather or other circumstances.) In game two, the Quetta Gladiators and the Lahore Qalandars faced off at Dubai with the previous year's runners-up, Quetta winning by eight runs. On the same day, Peshawar Zalmi got their first win of the season, winning by seven wickets thanks to 80* from the England captain Eoin Morgan. In game four, the Lahore Qalandars beat the previous year's champions Islamabad United. The pick of the bowlers for Lahore was Grant Elliott with 4/23 of his three overs. On the same day, Quetta continued their winning run, beating Karachi by seven wickets. Karachi's batsman fluctuated with Babar Azam, the only player who got a half century. The next game made history with the Lahore Qalandars recording the lowest ever total in PSL history with just 59 against Peshawar Zalmi. Despite this, they almost won the game having Zalmi at 52/7 at one point. In the end, Peshawar got across the line with three wickets to spare. On the same day, Quetta lost their unbeaten record, losing the match by five wickets thanks to Sam Billings' unbeaten 78.

==== Week 2 ====
Week 2 began on 16 February when the Lahore Qalandars took on the Karachi Kings in the second Karachi-Lahore derby of the season. Lahore Qalandars won by seven runs despite 65 of 45 from Kumar Sangakkara for Karachi. The next day, rain interrupted the game between the Peshawar Zalmi and the Quetta Gladiators; Peshawar were 117–3 before the points were shared because of the rain. Rain also hindered the game between Islamabad United and the Karachi Kings on the same day, with both sides being given 13 overs in the game. In the end, DLS awarded the win to Karachi by eight runs. Game 11 saw both sides crossing 200. Lahore made 200/3 while Quetta replied with 88* from Kevin Pieterson, winning with five wickets to spare. The second game of the day was a low scorer, with Peshawar Zalmi posting 136/9 from their 20 overs. In response, Islamabad won by five wickets winning the game on the last ball of the innings. In game 13, the Karachi Kings scored 174/4 in their 20 overs with the Pakistani batsman Shoaib Malik becoming the fifth highest scorer in T20 cricket. Peshawar made 165 in response with Shahid Afridi making 54. After the game, Shahid Afridi announced his retirement from international cricket bringing an end to a 20-year international career. The next game was a close encounter between Islamabad and Lahore, with Islamabad posting 145. In response an Umar Akmal 66 of 42 helped by a last over six from Grant Elliott, who then did a bat drop, gave the Lahore Qalandars a one wicket win

==== Week 3 ====
The first game of week 3 was between the Quetta Gladiators and the Karachi Kings; Quetta needed just one more win to secure a playoff spot. They got that win, thanks to 54 from Ahmed Shehzad who helped them win by six wickets. In game 16, Peshawar Zalmi played the Lahore Qalandars. At one point, the Qalandars looked like they were going to win before a collapse where they lost five wickets for a single run which helped give Zalmi a 17-run win. The next game was another close one, with 69 of 43 from Kevin Pieterson going in vain as Islamabad beat Quetta by one run. This meant Quetta's winning run was over and that Islamabad had qualified for the knockout stage. The following game between Lahore and Karachi also went down to the wire. With Karachi needing 10 of the last two balls, Kieron Pollard hit two sixes to keep Karachi's knockout hopes alive and give them a five-wicket win. In the penultimate game of the league stage, an unbeaten innings of 45 from Shahid Afridi helped Peshawar beat Quetta by two wickets and finish at the top of the table. In the final league game of the season, Karachi were looking to seal their place in the knockout stages with a win over Islamabad, which they did thanks to 44 from Chris Gayle to give them a six-wicket win, knocking the Lahore Qalandars out of the tournament.

=== Table of fixtures ===
Visitor team →	IU	KK	LQ	PZ	QG
Home team ↓	IU	KK	LQ	PZ	QG
Islamabad United		Karachi; 6 wickets	Lahore; 6 wickets	Islamabad; 7 wickets	Islamabad; 1 run
Karachi Kings	Karachi; 8 runs (D/L)		Lahore; 7 runs	Karachi; 9 runs	Quetta; 6 wickets
Lahore Qalandars	Lahore; 1 wicket	Karachi; 5 wickets		Peshawar; 17 runs	Quetta; 5 wickets
Peshawar Zalmi	Islamabad; 5 wickets	Peshawar; 7 wickets	Peshawar; 3 wickets		Peshawar; 2 wickets
Quetta Gladiators	Islamabad; 5 wickets	Quetta; 7 wickets	Quetta; 8 runs	Match abandoned	

Home team won	Visitor team won

- Note: Results listed are according to the home (horizontal) and visitor (vertical) teams.
- Note: Click on a result to see a summary of the match.

=== League Progression ===
Team	Group matches								Playoffs		
Team	1	2	3	4	5	6	7	8	E1/Q	E2	F
Islamabad United	2	2	4	4	6	6	8	8	L		
Karachi Kings	0	0	0	2	4	4	6	8	W	L	
Lahore Qalandars	0	2	2	4	4	6	6	6			
Peshawar Zalmi	0	2	4	5	5	5	7	9	L	W	W
Quetta Gladiators	2	4	4	5	7	9	9	9	W		L

Win	Loss	No result

- Note: The total points at the end of each group match are listed.
- Note: Click on the points (group matches) or W/L (playoffs) to see the match summary.

== Fixtures ==
The Pakistan Super League 2017 schedule was announced on 2 November 2016. The group stage of the tournament was made up of 20 matches held over 18 days started on 9 February 2017, with each team playing every other team twice. The top four teams qualified for the playoff stage of the tournament, with the final being held on 5 March.

All times are in Pakistan Standard Time (UTC+5).

9 February
22:50
Scorecard

Peshawar Zalmi; 190/9 (20 Overs)	v	Islamabad United; 175/3 (17.4 Overs)
Kamran Akmal 88 (48); Shane Watson 4/44 (4 Overs)		Brad Haddin 73 (49); Chris Jordan 1/30 (3.4 Overs)

Islamabad won by 7 wickets (D/L method)
Dubai International Cricket Stadium, Dubai
Umpires: Ahsan Raza (Pak) and Shozab Raza (Pak)
Player of the match: Brad Haddin (Islamabad United)

- Islamabad United won the toss and elected to field.
- Rain stopped play during Islamabad United innings and reduced Islamabad's target to 173 from 18 overs.

10 February
16:30 (D/N)
Scorecard

Quetta Gladiators; 136/9 (20 Overs)	v	Lahore Qalandars; 128 (18.4 Overs)
Rilee Rossouw 60 (47); Mohammad Irfan 3/26 (4 Overs)		Jason Roy 27 (14); Hasan Khan 2/10 (2.4 Overs)

Quetta Won by 8 runs
Dubai International Cricket Stadium, Dubai
Umpires: Rashid Riaz (Pak) and Shozab Raza (Pak)
Player of the match: Hasan Khan (Quetta Gladiators)

- Lahore Qalandars won the toss and elected to field.
- Mohammad Irfan (Lahore Qalandars) and Hasan Khan (Quetta Gladiators) made their T20 debuts.

10 February
21:00
Scorecard

Karachi Kings; 118/7 (20 overs)	v	Peshawar Zalmi; 119/3 (18.3 overs)
Shoaib Malik 44 (36); Mohammad Hafeez 2/7 (3 overs)		Eoin Morgan 80* (57); Imad Wasim 1/13 (3 overs)

Peshawar won by 7 wickets
Dubai International Cricket Stadium, Dubai
Umpires: Ahmed Shahab (Pak) and Ahsan Raza (Pak)
Player of the match: Eoin Morgan (Peshawar Zalmi)

- Peshawar Zalmi won the toss and elected to field.
- Abrar Ahmed (Karachi Kings) made his T20 debut.

11 February
16:30 (D/N)
Scorecard

Islamabad United; 158/7 (20 overs)	v	Lahore Qalandars; 160/4 (18.2 overs)
Misbah-ul-Haq 61* (36); Grant Elliott 4/23 (3 overs)		Jason Roy 60* (51); Rumman Raees 1/19 (3.2 overs)

Lahore won by 6 wickets
Dubai International Cricket Stadium, Dubai
Umpires: Asif Yaqoob (Pak) and Shozab Raza (Pak)
Player of the match: Jason Roy (Lahore Qalandars)

- Lahore Qalandars won the toss and elected to field.

11 February
21:00
Scorecard

Karachi Kings; 159/8 (20 overs)	v	Quetta Gladiators; 160/3 (19.1 overs)
Babar Azam 50 (42); Thisara Perera 3/34 (4 overs)		Rilee Rossouw 76*(53); Sohail Khan 3/23 (4 overs)

Quetta won by 7 wickets
Dubai International Cricket Stadium, Dubai
Umpires: Aleem Dar (Pak) and Rashid Riaz (Pak)
Player of the match: Rilee Rossouw (Quetta Gladiators)

- Quetta Gladiators won the toss and elected to field.

12 February
21:00
Scorecard

Lahore Qalandars; 59 (10.2 overs)	v	Peshawar Zalmi; 60/7 (17 Overs)
Fakhar Zaman 33 (19); Hasan Ali 3/23 (3 overs)		Eoin Morgan 23 (26); Yasir Shah 4/7 (4 overs)

Peshawar won by 3 wickets
Dubai International Cricket Stadium, Dubai
Umpires: Aleem Dar (Pak) and Richard Illingworth (Eng)
Player of the match: Yasir Shah (Lahore Qalandars)

- Peshawar Zalmi won the toss and elected to field.
- Lahore Qalandars recorded the lowest T20 score in PSL.
- Peshawar Zalmi recorded the equal lowest powerplay score in the PSL

15 February
21:00
Scorecard

Quetta Gladiators; 148/6 (20 Overs)	v	Islamabad United; 149/5 (19.1 Overs)
Asad Shafiq 45 (42); Shane Watson 2/22 (3 overs)		Sam Billings 78* (50); Mohammad Nawaz 2/18 (4 Overs)

Islamabad won by 5 wickets
Sharjah Cricket Stadium, Sharjah
Umpires: Aleem Dar (Pak) and Richard Illingworth (Eng)
Player of the match: Sam Billings (Islamabad United)

- Islamabad United won the toss and elected to field.

16 February
21:00
Scorecard

Lahore Qalandars; 179/8 (20 overs)	v	Karachi Kings; 172/8 (20 overs)
Fakhar Zaman 56 (36); Mohammad Amir 2/30 (4 overs)		Kumar Sangakkara 65 (45); Sohail Tanvir 2/30 (4 overs)

Lahore won by 7 runs
Sharjah Cricket Stadium, Sharjah
Umpires: Aleem Dar (Pak) and Richard Illingworth (Eng)
Player of the match: Fakhar Zaman (Lahore Qalandars)

- Karachi Kings won the toss and elected to field.

17 February
16:30 (D/N)
Scorecard

Peshawar Zalmi; 117/3 (16 overs)	v	Quetta Gladiators
Tamim Iqbal 62* (46); Hasan Khan 1/8 (2 overs)

No result
Sharjah Cricket Stadium, Sharjah
Umpires: Ahsan Raza (Pak) and Asif Yaqoob (Pak)

- Quetta Gladiators won the toss and elected to field.
- Match was reduced to 16 overs per side due to rain.
- Match was abandoned after end of Peshawar innings.

17 February
22:00
Scorecard

Islamabad United; 90/8 (13 overs)	v	Karachi Kings; 75/4 (9.4 overs)
Dwayne Smith 29 (22); Usama Mir 2/10 (3 overs)		Babar Azam 47* (30); Mohammad Irfan 2/7 (3 overs)

Karachi won by 8 runs (D/L method)
Sharjah Cricket Stadium, Sharjah
Umpires: Aleem Dar (Pak) and Richard Illingworth (Eng)
Player of the match: Babar Azam (Karachi Kings)

- Karachi Kings won the toss and elected to field.
- Match was reduced to 13 overs per side due to rain.

18 February
16:30 (D/N)
Scorecard

Lahore Qalandars; 200/3 (20 overs)	v	Quetta Gladiators; 202/5 (18.5 overs)
Jason Roy 51 (27); Hasan Khan 2/28 (4 overs)		Kevin Pietersen 88* (42); Sohail Tanvir 2/47 (3.5 overs)

Quetta won by 5 wickets
Sharjah Cricket Stadium, Sharjah
Umpires: Rashid Riaz (Pak) and Shozab Raza (Pak)
Player of the match: Kevin Pietersen (Quetta Gladiators)

- Quetta Gladiators won the toss and elected to field.

18 February
21:00
Scorecard

Peshawar Zalmi; 136/9 (20 overs)	v	Islamabad United; 137/5 (20 Overs)
Eoin Morgan 28 (28); Mohammad Sami 3/26 (4 overs)		Dwayne Smith 72* (59); Hasan Ali 1/17 (4 Overs)

Islamabad won by 5 wickets
Sharjah Cricket Stadium, Sharjah
Umpires: Aleem Dar (Pak) and Richard Illingworth (Eng)
Player of the match: Mohammad Sami (Islamabad United)

- Islamabad United won the toss and elected to field.

19 February
21:00
Scorecard

Karachi Kings; 174/4 (20 Overs)	v	Peshawar Zalmi; 165 (19.5 Overs)
Shoaib Malik 51* (27); Iftikhar Ahmed 2/8 (2 overs)		Shahid Afridi 54 (28); Sohail Khan 3/28 (4 overs)

Karachi won by 9 runs
Sharjah Cricket Stadium, Sharjah
Umpires: Ahmed Shahab (Pak) and Aleem Dar (Pak)
Player of the match: Shoaib Malik (Karachi Kings)

- Peshawar Zalmi won the toss and elected to field.
- Shoaib Malik became the 5th highest run scorer in T20 cricket.

20 February
21:00 (D/N)
Scorecard

Islamabad United; 145/8 (20 overs)	v	Lahore Qalandars; 146/9 (19.2 Overs)
Shadab Khan 42 (24); Aamer Yamin 3/17 (4 overs)		Umar Akmal 66 (42); Rumman Raees 3/26 (4 Overs)

Lahore won by 1 wicket
Sharjah Cricket Stadium, Sharjah
Umpires: Ahmed Shahab (Pak) and Ahsan Raza (Pak)
Player of the match: Umar Akmal (Lahore Qalandars)

- Lahore Qalandars won the toss and elected to field.

23 February
21:00
Scorecard

Karachi Kings; 154/6 (20 overs)	v	Quetta Gladiators; 158/4 (19 Overs)
Babar Azam 36 (37); Mahmudullah 3/21 (4 overs)		Ahmed Shehzad 54 (40); Sohail Khan 2/28 (3 Overs)

Quetta won by 6 wickets
Dubai International Cricket Stadium, Dubai
Umpires: Aleem Dar (Pak) and Ranmore Martinesz (SL)
Player of the match: Mahmudullah (Quetta Gladiators)

- Quetta Gladiators won the toss and elected to field.

24 February
16:30 (D/N)
Scorecard

Peshawar Zalmi; 149/9 (20 overs)	v	Lahore Qalandars; 136/9 (20 overs)
Kamran Akmal 58 (40); Yasir Shah 2/19 (4 overs)		Sohail Tanvir 36* (29); Shakib Al Hasan 2/13 (2 overs)

Peshawar won by 13 runs
Dubai International Cricket Stadium, Dubai
Umpires: Ranmore Martinesz (SL) and Shozab Raza (Pak)
Player of the match: Shakib Al Hasan (Peshawar Zalmi)

- Peshawar Zalmi won the toss and elected to bat.

24 February
21:00
Scorecard

Islamabad United; 165/6 (20 overs)	v	Quetta Gladiators; 164/5 (20 Overs)
Hussain Talat 56 (39); Zulfiqar Babar 2/17 (4 overs)		Kevin Pietersen 69 (43); Mohammad Irfan 1/23 (4 overs)

Islamabad won by 1 run
Dubai International Cricket Stadium, Dubai
Umpires: Ahsan Raza (Pak) and Aleem Dar (Pak)
Player of the match: Mohammad Sami (Islamabad United)

- Quetta Gladiators won the toss and elected to field.

25 February
16:30 (D/N)
Scorecard

Lahore Qalandars; 155/6 (20 overs)	v	Karachi Kings; 158/5 (20 overs)
Mohammad Rizwan 32* (24); Shoaib Malik 2/21 (4 overs)		Babar Azam 49 (42); Fakhar Zaman 1/3 (1 over)

Karachi won by 5 wickets
Dubai International Cricket Stadium, Dubai
Umpires: Ranmore Martinesz (SL) and Shozab Raza (Pak)
Player of the match: Kieron Pollard (Karachi Kings)

- Karachi Kings won the toss and elected to field.

25 February
21:00
Scorecard

Quetta Gladiators; 128 (20 Overs)	v	Peshawar Zalmi; 130/8 (19.2 overs)
Kevin Pietersen 41 (43); Mohammad Asghar 3/33 (4 overs)		Shahid Afridi 45* (23); Tymal Mills 3/20 (4 overs)

Peshawar won by 2 wickets
Dubai International Cricket Stadium, Dubai
Umpires: Ahmed Shahab (Pak) and Ahsan Raza (Pak)
Player of the match: Mohammad Asghar (Peshawar Zalmi)

- Peshawar Zalmi won the toss and elected to field.

26 February
22:30
Scorecard

Islamabad United; 123/7 (15 Overs)	v	Karachi Kings; 127/4 (14.5 Overs)
Dwayne Smith 49 (36); Sohail Khan 2/23 (3 Overs)		Chris Gayle 44 (17); Shadab Khan 3/13 (3 Overs)

Karachi won by 6 wickets
Dubai International Cricket Stadium, Dubai
Umpires: Aleem Dar (Pak) and Ranmore Martinesz (SL)
Player of the match: Chris Gayle (Karachi Kings)

- Karachi Kings won the toss and elected to field.
- Match was reduced to 15 overs per side due to rain.
- As a result of this match Lahore Qalandars were eliminated.

== Playoffs ==
The tournament's playoff stage featured the four highest placed teams from the league stage of the competition. Before the tournament, it was confirmed DRS would be used for the playoffs. It began on 28 February 2017 with the final played on 5 March. The winner of a qualifier match between the top two ranked teams progressed straight to the final, with the loser of that match playing the winner of an elimination match between the third and fourth ranked teams. The final took place at the Gaddafi Stadium in Lahore. All other playoff matches were held in the United Arab Emirates.

On 23 February Quetta Gladiators booked the first playoff place after defeating Karachi Kings. Then Islamabad United defeated Quetta Gladiators on 24 February and they also qualified, while Peshawar Zalmi qualified by defeating Quetta Gladiators on 25 February. Karachi Kings then qualified after a victory against Islamabad United on 27 February, resulting in the elimination of Lahore Qalandars from the tournament.

All times are in Pakistan Standard Time (UTC+5).

Semifinals
28 February — Sharjah Cricket Stadium
1	Peshawar Zalmi	199/9 (20 overs)
2	Quetta Gladiators	200/7 (20 overs)
1 March — Sharjah Cricket Stadium
3	Karachi Kings	126 (19.4 overs)
4	Islamabad United	82 (15.2 overs)

Preliminary final
3 March — Dubai International Cricket Stadium
1	Peshawar Zalmi	181/3 (20 overs)
3	Karachi Kings	157/7 (20 overs)

Final
5 March — Gaddafi Stadium
2	Quetta Gladiators	90 (16.3 overs)
1	Peshawar Zalmi	148/6 (20 overs)

=== Qualifier ===
28 February
21:00
Scorecard

Quetta Gladiators; 200/7 (20 overs)	v	Peshawar Zalmi; 199/9 (20 overs)
Ahmed Shehzad 71 (38); Wahab Riaz 3/40 (4 overs)		Mohammad Hafeez 77 (47); Mohammad Nawaz 3/51 (4 overs)

Quetta won by 1 run
Sharjah Cricket Stadium, Sharjah
Umpires: Ranmore Martinesz (SL) and Shozab Raza (Pak)
Player of the match: Ahmed Shehzad (Quetta Gladiators)

- Peshawar Zalmi won the toss and elected to field.
- As a result of this match Quetta Gladiators qualified for the final.

The qualifiers meant the top two teams on the table, Peshawar and Quetta, would face off. Peshawar Zalmi won the toss and sent in Quetta to bat. One of the openers, Luke Wright, got out for 12 facing seven balls, while the other, Ahmed Shehzad, made 71 off 38 balls which won him man of the match. Kevin Pieterson came in next and supported Shehzad with 40 off 22. Afterwards came twin 17's from Riley Rossouw and then Quetta's captain, Sarfaraz Ahmed. Next came Anwar Ali, who made 20 as Quetta's lower middle order fluctuated before one not out from both Mohammad Nawaz and Hassan Khan to get the gladiators to exactly 200. The pick of the bowlers for Peshawar was Wahab Riaz, who took three wickets. In response chasing 201, one of Peshawar's openers Kamran Akmal got out scoring a single run while the other Dawid Malan made 56 of 30. Coming in at three Marlon Samuels also only made one before being run out. Next at four was Mohammed Hafeez who anchored the innings for Zalmi scoring 77 of 47 bringing them close to the target. Helping Hafeez was the former Pakistan captain Shahid Afridi, who made 34 of just 13 before getting out. Going into the last over Peshawar needed seven runs, however economical bowling from Mohammad Nawaz meant Peshawar only scored six runs while losing three wickets in the process, giving Quetta a one run win and sending them into the final.

=== Eliminator 1 ===
1 March
21:00
Scorecard

Karachi Kings; 126 (19.4 overs)	v	Islamabad United; 82 (15.2 overs)
Babar Azam 25 (21); Rumman Raees 4/25 (4 overs)		Asif Ali 39 (36); Mohammad Amir 3/7 (2.2 overs)

Karachi won by 44 runs
Sharjah Cricket Stadium, Sharjah
Umpires: Ahsan Raza (Pak) and Shozab Raza (Pak)
Player of the match: Imad Wasim (Karachi Kings)

- Islamabad United won the toss and elected to field.
- As a result of this match Islamabad United were eliminated.

The first eliminator meant the teams at three and four on the table, Islamabad and Karachi, would play each other. Islamabad United won the toss and sent Karachi in to bat. One of Karachi's openers, Babar Azam, made 25 of 21 hitting five fours, while the other, Chris Gayle, made 17 off 15. In next was the Karachi Kings' captain, Kumar Sangakkara, who scored 17 off 19 balls. After Sangakkara was Shoaib Malik who, like Babar, scored 25. The Kings' middle order continued to stumble with Ravi Bopara coming in and scoring 14 before getting out to Shadab Khan via a Shane Watson catch. After Bopara came Kieron Pollard, who was soon sent back to the pavilion for just five. Next in was Imad Wasim, who made 14 before being dismissed. There was a golden duck next with Sohail Khan getting out first ball. Mohammed Amir was batting at nine and finished with two not out as the tail was quickly dismissed. The pick of the bowlers for Islamabad was Rumman Raees, who took a 4-fer (four wickets in an innings) finishing with 4/25 from his four overs. In response, one of the openers, Dwayne Smith, got out cheaply for eight while the other, Asif Ali, was on 39 before getting out. United's middle order and tail also fluctuated with scores of zero, thirteen, eight, one, one, seven and the tail all getting ducks giving Karachi a 44 run win and knocking Islamabad out.

=== Eliminator 2 ===
3 March
21:00
Scorecard

Peshawar Zalmi; 181/3 (20 overs)	v	Karachi Kings; 157/7 (20 overs)
Kamran Akmal 104 (65); Mohammad Amir 1/31 (4 overs)		Kieron Pollard 47 (26); Wahab Riaz 3/24 (4 overs)

Peshawar won by 24 runs
Dubai International Cricket Stadium, Dubai
Umpires: Ahsan Raza (Pak) and Ranmore Martinesz (SL)
Player of the match: Kamran Akmal (Peshawar Zalmi)

- Karachi Kings won the toss and elected to field.
- As a result of this match Karachi Kings were eliminated and Peshawar Zalmi qualified for the final.
- Kamran Akmal scored his first century of the PSL and second overall in PSL History.

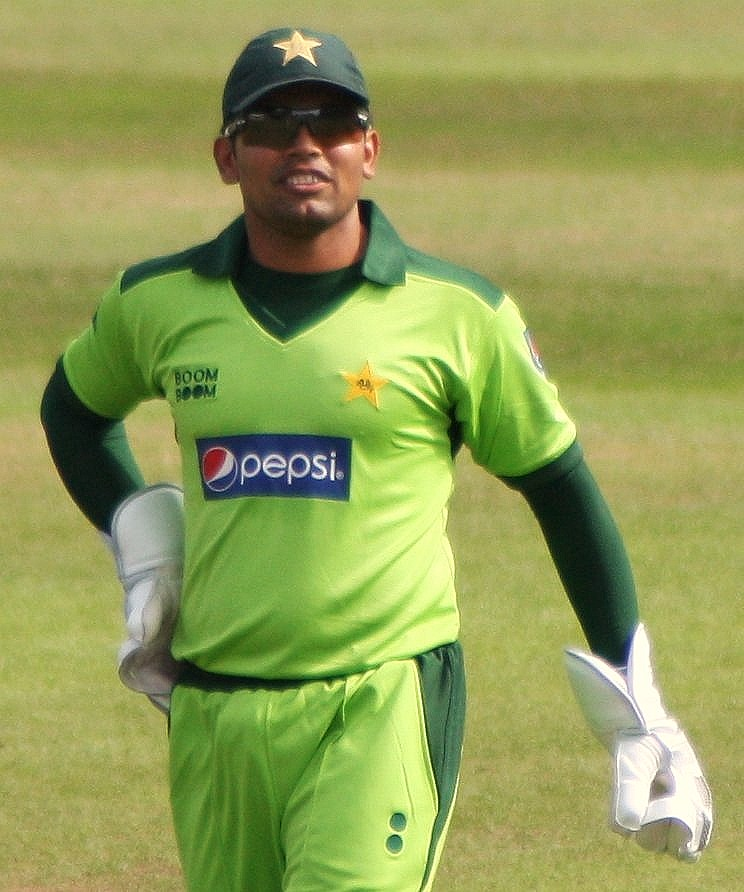
Kamran Akmal (pictured in 2010) scored 104 off 64 balls against the Karachi Kings.

The second eliminator put the loser of the Qualifier against the winner of the first eliminator—Peshawar Zalmi and the Karachi Kings. The Karachi Kings won the toss and chose to bowl first, which meant Zalmi would bat first. The Zalmi wicket-keeper batsman Kamran Akmal scored a century, making him the second person in PSL history to do so. Supporting Akmal were Dawid Malan with 36 and Marlon Samuels with 37 off 22. Shahid Afridi was dismissed for a duck with Daren Sammy scoring 0 not out. In response, Babar Azam was dismissed scoring only one run from seven deliveries. In contrast, his opening partner, Chris Gayle, made 40 from 31 before getting out. Next came the Kings' captain Kumar Sangakkara, who made 15 before losing his wicket. Afterwards came a middle order collapse which was patched up by a Kieron Pollard 47 and an Imad Wasim 26. In the end though, it was not enough as Peshawar won by 24 runs, sending Karachi out and themselves into the final. Wahab Riaz was the pick of the bowlers for Zalmi, finishing with 3/24 from four overs.

=== Final ===
5 March
20:00
Scorecard

Peshawar Zalmi; 148/6 (20 overs)	v	Quetta Gladiators; 90 (16.3 Overs)
Kamran Akmal 40 (32); Rayad Emrit 3/31 (4 overs)		Sean Ervine 24 (19); Mohammad Asghar 3/16 (4 Overs)

Peshawar won by 58 runs
Gaddafi Stadium, Lahore
Umpires: Ranmore Martinesz (SL) and Ahsan Raza (Pak)
Player of the match: Darren Sammy (Peshawar Zalmi)

- Quetta Gladiators won the toss and elected to field.
- Peshawar Zalmi won the second edition of PSL as the result of this match.
- This was Quetta Gladiators' second consecutive defeat in a PSL final.

The final was played on 5 March at the Gaddafi Stadium in Lahore, Pakistan. It marked the return of cricket to the country after the 2009 attack on the Sri Lanka national cricket team, which forced Pakistan to play all of their international home games in the United Arab Emirates because of security concerns. The PCB and the Pakistan Super League bought buses that were bullet proof to bring players and umpires to the stadium, and a large-scale security and intelligence operation took place in Lahore. Teams jetted in to Lahore on the morning of the final and flew out after the match was finished.

Overseas players could opt-out of going to Lahore for the final. Four of Quetta's players did so, including Kevin Pietersen, the team's icon player who was their first selection in the 2016 Pakistan Super League players draft. The PCB had put in place a system to allow the teams to replace players who chose not to play in the final.

==== Match summary ====
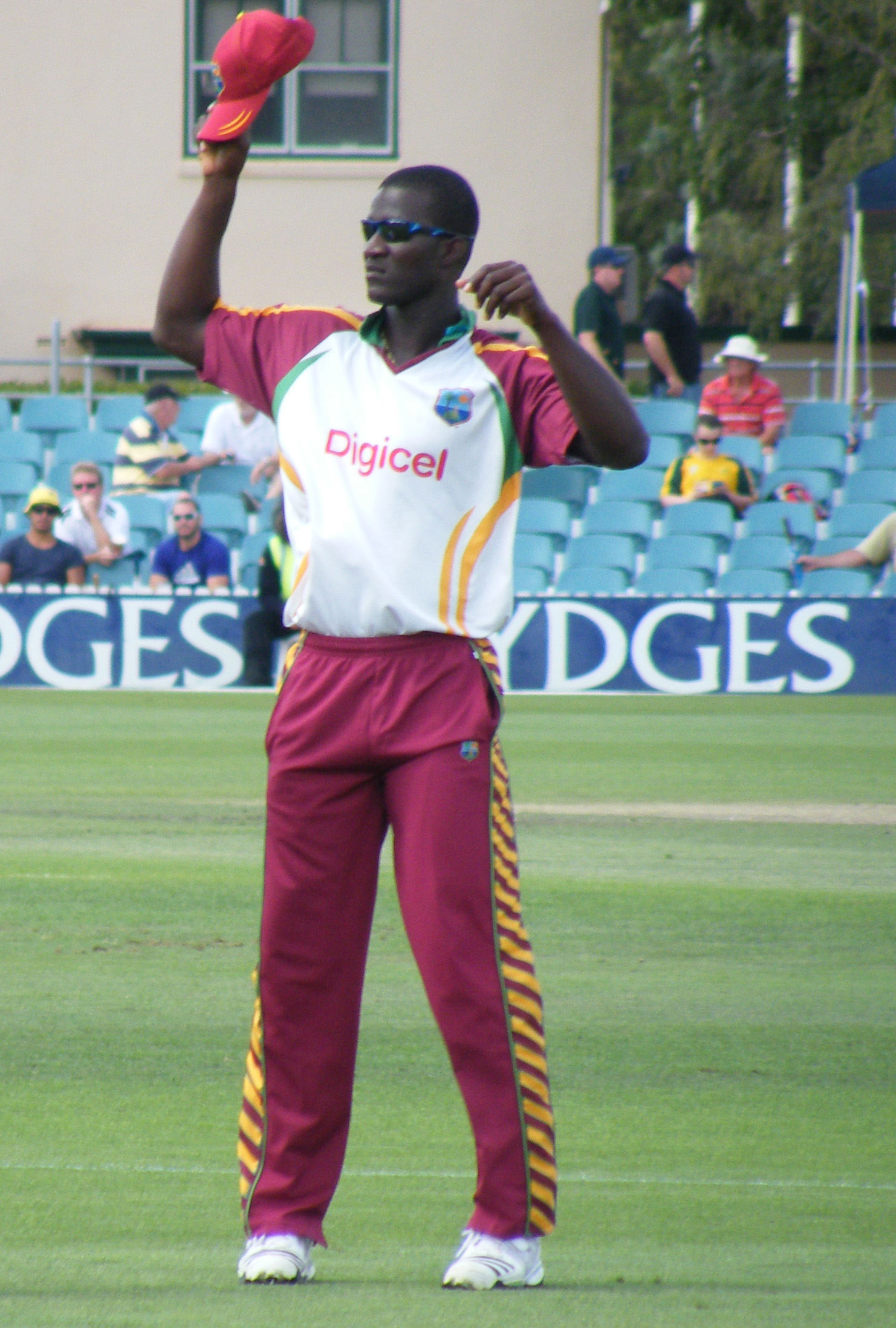
Daren Sammy (pictured in 2010) hit 28 to get Zalmi over 150.

Quetta won the toss and chose to bowl in the final; Dawid Malan and Kamran Akmal opened for Zalmi. Malan was dismissed first for 17 by Rayad Emrit, one of the replacement players for Quetta. While at the other end, Kamran Akmal was out for 40 getting out Leg before wicket (LBW) to Hassan Khan. Afterwards came Marlon Samuels, who made 19. Mohammed Hafeez followed Samuels and made 12. In at five was Khushdil Shah who got out for a single run. While at six was Iftikhar Ahmed who made 14. With Zalmi fluctuating, their captain, Darren Sammy, came in and made an unbeaten 28, hitting two sixes in the last over which propelled Peshawar over 150. This later won Sammy the man of the match award. In response Quetta's top order never got going with scores of one, one and three for Morne van Wyk, Ahmed Shehzad and Anamul Haque, respectively. Some stability was provided by Sarfaraz Ahmed and Sean Ervine, who both made twenties. In the end, Quetta were bowled out for 90 which resulted in a 58-run victory for Peshawar, making them the champions of PSL 2.

== Awards and statistics ==
The player of the tournament was Kamran Akmal of Peshawar Zalmi. Kamran scored 353 runs winning the Hanif Mohammad award for top scorer and the Imtiaz Ahmed award for the best wicket-keeper. Sohail Khan of Karachi Kings took 16 wickets at an average of 15.00 to be the leading wicket-taker ahead of Wahab Riaz of Peshawar Zalmi with 15. The winners of the Spirit of Cricket award were Quetta Gladiators.

=== Most runs ===
Player	Team	Mat	Inns	Runs	HS
Kamran Akmal	Peshawar Zalmi	11	11	353	104
Babar Azam	Karachi Kings	10	10	291	50
Dwayne Smith	Islamabad United	9	9	274	72*
Rilee Rossouw	Quetta Gladiators	9	8	255	76*
Ahmed Shehzad	Quetta Gladiators	10	9	242	71
Source: ESPNcricinfo, Last updated : 6 March 2017

- Kamran Akmal of Peshawar Zalmi received the Green Cap.

=== Most wickets ===
Player	Team	Mat	Inns	Wkts	BBI
Sohail Khan	Karachi Kings	9	9	16	3/23
Wahab Riaz	Peshawar Zalmi	10	9	15	3/24
Rumman Raees	Islamabad United	7	7	12	4/25
Mohammad Sami	Islamabad United	9	9	12	3/26
Usama Mir	Karachi Kings	8	8	12	3/24
Source: ESPNcricinfo, Last updated : 5 March 2017

- Sohail Khan of Karachi Kings received the Maroon Cap.

== See also ==
- 2017 Pakistan Super League spot-fixing controversy
- Peshawar Zalmi in 2017
- Quetta Gladiators in 2017
- Karachi Kings in 2017
- Islamabad United in 2017
- Lahore Qalandars in 2017
