= 2017 Quetta Gladiators season =

Pakistani franchise cricket team

Quetta Gladiators
2017 season
- Coach: Moin Khan
- Captain: Sarfraz Ahmed
- PSL 2017: 2nd (runner-up)
- Most runs: .Rilee Rossouw (255)
- Most wickets: Mohammad Nawaz (10)

The Quetta Gladiators is a franchise cricket team that represents Quetta in the Pakistan Super League. They were one of the five teams that had a competition in the 2017 Pakistan Super League. The team was captained by Sarfraz Ahmed, and coached by Moin Khan. The team was mentored by Viv Richards. They finished on second position after winning four matches from their eight matches in the PSL 2017. They finished runners-up for the second time in a row after losing the final against Peshawar Zalmi.

== Squad ==
Kumar Sangakkara and Grant Elliott were released by Quetta just a few days before the PSL transfer window came to an end in September 2016. Sangakara was signed by Karachi Kings while Grant Elliot joined Lahore Qalandars.

Quetta retained 10 players in advance of the 2017 Pakistan Super League players draft and signed eight during the draft. The signings including overseas players Rovman Powell, Tymal Mills, and David Willey. However, of these only Mills joined the team as the other players were unavailable. Mahmudullah Riad and Rilee Rossouw joined the team as replacements for Mohammad Nabi and David Willey.

Name	Nationality	Batting style	Bowling style	Year signed	Notes
Batsmen
Ahmed Shehzad	Pakistan	Right-handed	Right-arm leg break	2016	
Kevin Pietersen	England	Right-handed	Right-arm off break	2016	Overseas
Asad Shafiq	Pakistan	Right-handed	Right-arm off break	2016	
Rilee Rossouw	South Africa	Left-handed	Right-arm off break	2017	Overseas
Anamul Haque	Bangladesh	Right-handed	—	2017	Overseas
All-rounders
Saad Nasim	Pakistan	Right-handed	Right-arm leg break	2016	
Luke Wright	England	Right-handed	Right-arm medium-fast	2016	Overseas
Thisara Perera	Sri Lanka	Left-handed	Right-arm fast-Medium	2016	Overseas
Umar Amin	Pakistan	Left-handed	Right-arm medium	2017	
Mohammad Nawaz	Pakistan	Right-handed	slow left-arm orthodox	2016	
Mahmudullah	Bangladesh	Right-handed	Left-arm off break	2017	Overseas
Elton Chigumbura	Zimbabwe	Right-handed	Right-arm medium-fast	2016	Overseas
Sean Ervine	Zimbabwe	Left-handed	Right-arm Medium	2017	Overseas
Anwar Ali	Pakistan	Right-handed	Right-arm fast-medium	2016	
Wicket-keeper
Sarfraz Ahmed	Pakistan	Right-handed	—	2018	Captain
Bismillah Khan	Pakistan	Right-handed	—	2016	
Morne van Wyk	South Africa	Right-handed	—	2017	Overseas
Bowlers
Umar Gul	Pakistan	Right-handed	Right-arm fast	2018	
Tymal Mills	England	Right-handed	Left-arm fast	2017	Overseas
Nathan McCullum	New Zealand	Right-handed	Right-arm off break	2016	Overseas
Zulfiqar Babar	Pakistan	Right-handed	Slow Left-arm Orthodox	2016	
Mir Hamza	Pakistan	Right-handed	Left-arm medium-fast	2017	
Hasan Khan	Pakistan	Right-handed	Slow left-arm orthodox	2017	
Noor Wali	Pakistan	Right-handed	Right-arm medium	2017	
Aizaz Cheema	Pakistan	Right-handed	Right-arm medium-fast	2016	
Rayad Emrit	West Indies	Right-handed	Right-arm fast-medium	2017	Overseas

== Kit manufacturers and sponsors ==
Shirt sponsor (chest)	Shirt sponsor (back)	Chest branding	Sleeve branding
Jubilee Insurance	Omar Associates	Master Oil	PTV Sports

Playing kit

== Season summary ==
In their opening game of the 2017 season, Quetta Gladiators managed to defend a target of 137 against the Lahore Qalanders. The match was closely fought and went down to the penultimate over where the Gladiators won by 8 runs. Debutant Hasan Khan emerging player of Quetta was adjudged player-of-the-match for his all round performance of 2 important wickets and a quick-fire 16 runs at the end. In the following match, Gladiators beat Karachi Kings by 7 wickets. After an initial stutter in pursuit of 160, that saw them at 30/3, Riley Roussow and Sarfaraz Ahmed combined in an unbeaten partnership of 130 for the fourth wicket to take the Gladiators home with 5 balls to spare. Rilee Rossouw was adjudged man-of-the-match for his unbeaten, match-winning knock of 76 off 53 balls.

During the second leg of the tournament, in Sharjah, the Gladiators suffered their first loss of the season at the hands of defending champions, Islamabad United. After putting up a target of 149 in their 20-overs, that saw the Gladiators struggling to accelerate their innings, they lost by 5 wickets. In the following game, against Peshawar Zalmi, the match was abandoned after repeated showers and the two teams shared the points from the bout. Continuing their campaign, the Gladiators successful chased down 201 against the Lahore Qalandars in what many pundits labeled as the match-of-the-season. Kevin Pieterson and Sarfaraz Ahmad were instrumental in the chase through a 101-run partnership. The former who was going through a lean patch in this PSL struck form and hit 88 from 42 balls - including 8 sixes, as the Gladiators plundered 78 runs from the last 3.5 overs to seal the match.

As the tournament shifted back to Dubai, the Gladiators continued their winning streak by beating Karachi Kings by 6-wickets. The team's chase of 155 was commandeered by a 105-run opening partnership between Ahmad Shahzad 54(40) and Asad Shafiq 45(33) - the highest of this edition's PSL. This win also effectively made the Gladaiotrs the first team to qualify for the play-offs. Continuing on, the team lost both of their last two matches of the league stage - against Islamabad United and Peshawar Zalmi respectively. In the former, the Gladiators imploded in the chase of 166 despite a 2nd-wicket partnership of 133 between Kevin Pieterson 69(43) and Ahmad Shahzad 53(43). Requiring, seven runs from the last two overs, the team fell short by 1 run. In the next match, the Gladiators could only manage a below-par score of 128 batting first. However, the team fielded and bowled quite well to have the chasing Zalmis reduce to 52–6 before Shahid Afridi took his team home with 2-wickets to spare. The team thus qualified for Qualifier 1, and defeated Peshawar Zalmi by 1 run in a close encounter to qualify for the final directly. They put a score of 200/7 by the efforts of 71 runs innings of Ahmed Shehzad.

=== Season standings ===
Quetta Gladiators finished second in the points table of 2017 Pakistan Super League.

Pos	Team	Pld	W	L	NR	Pts	NRR
1	Peshawar Zalmi (C)	8	4	3	1	9	0.309
2	Quetta Gladiators (R)	8	4	3	1	9	0.166
3	Karachi Kings (3rd)	8	4	4	0	8	−0.098
4	Islamabad United (4th)	8	4	4	0	8	−0.139
5	Lahore Qalandars	8	3	5	0	6	−0.223

Source: ESPNcricinfo
- Top 4 teams qualified for the playoffs
- Advanced to Qualifier
- Advanced to Eliminator 1

Notes:

- C = Champions;
- R = Runner-up;
- (x) = Position at the end of the tournament;
