= 2017 Peshawar Zalmi season =

Pakistani cricket team

Peshawar Zalmi
2017 season
- Coach: Mohammad Akram
- Captain: Darren Sammy
- Final: Champions
- Most runs: Kamran Akmal (353)
- Most wickets: Wahab Riaz (15)

The Peshawar Zalmi is a franchise cricket team that represents Peshawar in the Pakistan Super League. They were one of the five teams that competed in the 2017 Pakistan Super League. The team was captained by Darren Sammy, and they stand on first position after winning four matches from their eight matches in the PSL 2017. The team won the tournament after defeating Quetta Gladiators in final.

== Squad ==
Peshawar traded Aamer Yamin for Sohaib Maqsood of Lahore Qalandars during the off-season. During the 2017 Pakistan Super League players draft they retained 10 players and signed eight, including Overseas players Shakib Al Hasan, Eoin Morgan, Chris Jordan and Alex Hales. Shakib and Tamim were not available for selection during the initial stage of tournament due to national duties. Later Alex Hales and Shakib were replaced with Tillakaratne Dilshan and Marlon Samuels and Mohammad Shahzad was replaced with Andre Fletcher while Tamim Iqbal was replaced with Samit Patel.

Name	Nationality	Batting style	Bowling style	Year signed	Notes
Batsmen
Sohaib Maqsood	Pakistan	Right-handed	Right-armoOffbreak	2017	
Iftikhar Ahmed	Pakistan	Right-handed	Right-arm off spin	2017	
Eoin Morgan	England	Left-handed	Right-arm medium-fast	2017	Overseas
Tamim Iqbal	Bangladesh	Left Hand	Left-arm off spin	2016	Overseas
Khushdil Shah	Pakistan	Left-handed	Slow left-arm orthodox	2017	
Dawid Malan	England	Left-handed	Right-arm leg spin	2016	Overseas
Marlon Samuels	West Indies	Right Hand	Right-arm Off spin	2017	Overseas
All-rounders
Haris Sohail	Pakistan	Left-handed	Slow left-arm Orthodox	2017	
Shahid Afridi	Pakistan	Right-handed	Right-arm leg spin	2016	
Mohammad Hafeez	Pakistan	Right-handed	Right-arm off spin	2016	
Darren Sammy	West Indies	Right-handed	Right-arm medium-fast	2016	Captain, Overseas
Shakib Al Hasan	Bangladesh	Left-handed	Slow left-arm orthodox	2017	Overseas
Samit Patel	England	Right-handed	Slow left-arm orthodox	2017	Overseas
Wicket-keeper
Kamran Akmal	Pakistan	Right-handed	—	2016	
Bowlers
Mohammad Asghar	Pakistan	Left-handed	Left-arm spin	2016	
Junaid Khan	Pakistan	Left-handed	Left-arm fast	2016	
Wahab Riaz	Pakistan	Right-handed	Left-arm fast	2016	
Chris Jordan	England	Right-handed	Right-arm fast	2017	Overseas
Imran Khan	Pakistan	Right-handed	Left-arm medium-fast	2016	
Hasan Ali	Pakistan	Right-handed	Right-arm medium-fast	2016	
Irfan Khan	Pakistan	Right-handed	Right-arm e.g.-break	2017	

== Kit manufacturers and sponsors ==
Kit manufacturer	Shirt sponsor (chest)	Shirt sponsor (back)	Chest branding	Sleeve branding
Zalmi in-house	General Petroleum	Giggly Boom Boom Bubblegum	Jivi Mobiles	Super Power Motorcycles, Jang, Khaleej Times

Playing kit

== Season summary ==
In their first game of PSL 2017, Peshawar Zalmi lost to Islamabad United by 7 wickets. In their next game against Karachi Kings, Zalmi won by 7 wickets in pursuit of 120. Eoin Morgan starred in the chase with an unbeaten innings of 80 off 57 balls. Following this the Zalmi were involved in a low-scoring thriller with the Lahore Qalandars that saw the former collapse in the chase of just 60 runs before getting over the line with 3 wickets to spare.

As the tournament moved to Sharjah, Zalmi's first game against Quetta Gladiators was abandoned after repeated showers and the two teams shared the points from the bout. Zalmi then lost a hard-fought game against Islamabad United that went down to the last ball. After being put in to bat by United, Zalmi could only manage a below-par score of 137 and never really got going. But the team's bowlers bowled exceedingly well to make a contest out of it. In their final game of the Sharjah leg, the Zalmis continued their losing streak after being beaten by Karachi Kings in a thrilling contest. Setting up a target of 175, the Kings had the Zalmis reduced to 69–6 before Shahid Afridi and Darren Sammy combined in a 70-run partnership that almost won the game for the Zalmis. However, they couldn't see the game through as the Zalmis fell short by 9 runs.

With the tournament shifting back to Dubai, the Zalmis registered consecutive wins against Lahore Qalandars and Quetta Gladiators respectively. Against the Qalandars, the team put up a target of 167 and then successful defended it after inducing a batting collapse of 5 wickets for 6 runs from the opposition. In the end prevailing by 17 runs and securing a play-off spot. But with the Galdiators, the team suffered a batting collapse of their own. Chasing a below-par total of 129, the Zalmis were at one time reduced to 52–6 before a vintage performance from Shahid Afridi, who scored 45 off 23 balls, ensured that his team won with 2 wickets left intact. The team thus qualified Qualifier 1, but were defeated by Quetta Gladiators by 1 run in a close encounter, despite the 77 runs innings of Mohammad Hafeez.

=== Season standings ===
Peshawar Zalmi topped the points table of 2017 Pakistan Super League.

Pos	Team	Pld	W	L	NR	Pts	NRR
1	Peshawar Zalmi (C)	8	4	3	1	9	0.309
2	Quetta Gladiators (R)	8	4	3	1	9	0.166
3	Karachi Kings (3rd)	8	4	4	0	8	−0.098
4	Islamabad United (4th)	8	4	4	0	8	−0.139
5	Lahore Qalandars	8	3	5	0	6	−0.223

Source: ESPNcricinfo
- Top 4 teams qualified for the playoffs
- Advanced to Qualifier
- Advanced to Eliminator 1

Notes:

- C = Champions;
- R = Runner-up;
- (x) = Position at the end of the tournament;
