= 2017 Islamabad United season =

Pakistani franchise cricket team

Islamabad United
2017 season
- Coach: Dean Jones
- Captain: Misbah ul Haq
- PSL 2017: Eliminator
- Most runs: Dwayne Smith (274)
- Most wickets: Rumman Raees (12)

Islamabad United is a franchise cricket team that played in the 2017 Pakistan Super League (PSL). They were one of the five teams that took part in the 2017 competition and were captained by Misbah ul Haq and coached by Dean Jones. United's were the defending champion in this PSL edition, having won the inaugural edition, but after finishing fourth in the group stage, their journey in PSL 2017 ended when they were eliminated in the first match of the playoffs.

== Squad ==
In the 2017 Pakistan Super League players draft, Islamabad retained 17 players from their previous squad. They added Ben Duckett, Zohaib Khan and Shadab Khan to complete their 20 men squad. Later Steven Finn replaced Andre Russell after he was banned for a year for a doping breach and Duckett was replaced by Nicholas Pooran before the start of play-offs after an international call-up.

Name	Nationality	Batting style	Bowling style	Year signed	Notes
Batsmen
Sharjeel Khan	Pakistan	Left-handed	Right-arm leg spin	2016	
Misbah-ul-Haq	Pakistan	Right-handed	—	2016	Captain
Khalid Latif	Pakistan	Right-handed	Right-arm off spin	2016	
Hussain Talat	Pakistan	Left-handed	Right-arm medium	2016	
Rafatullah Mohmand	Pakistan	Right-handed	Slow left-arm orthodox	2017	
Ben Duckett	England	Left-handed	Right-arm offbreak	2017	Overseas
Asif Ali	Pakistan	Right-handed	Right-arm medium-fast	2016	
All-Rounders
Shane Watson	Australia	Right-handed	Right-arm fast-medium	2016	
Shadab Khan	Pakistan	Right-handed	Right-arm leg-break	2017	
Imran Khalid	Pakistan	Left-handed	Left-arm orthodox spin	2016	
Dwayne Smith	West Indies	Right-handed	Right-arm medium	2016	Overseas
Zohaib Khan	Pakistan	Right-handed	Slow left-arm orthodox	2017	
Wicket-keepers
Sam Billings	England	Right-handed	—	2016	Overseas
Nicholas Pooran	West Indies	Left-handed	—	2017	Overseas
Brad Haddin	Australia	Right-handed	—	2016	Overseas
Bowlers
Saeed Ajmal	Pakistan	Right-handed	Right-arm off spin	2016	
Mohammad Irfan	Pakistan	Right-handed	Left-arm fast	2016	
Mohammad Sami	Pakistan	Right-handed	Right-arm fast	2016	
Samuel Badree	West Indies	Right-handed	Right-arm leg spin	2016	Overseas
Amad Butt	Pakistan	Right-handed	Right-arm fast	2016	
Steven Finn	England	Right-handed	Right-arm fast	2017	Overseas
Rumman Raees	Pakistan	Right-handed	Left-arm medium-fast	2016	

== Kit manufacturers and sponsors ==
Shirt sponsor (chest)	Shirt sponsor (back)	Chest branding	Sleeve branding
Q Mobile	PTCL	JS Bank	Dunya News

Playing kit

== Season summary ==
Islamabad United played the opening match of the 2017 season against Peshawar Zalmi, winning by seven wickets and continuing their winning streak from the previous season. They lost their second match to Lahore Qalanders.

As the tournament shifted to Sharjah, Islamabad beat Quetta Gladiators, Sam Billings was top-scoring with an aggressive innings of 78 runs from 50 balls. A narrow loss in a rain-affected match against Karachi Kings was followed by a last-ball victory against Peshawar Zalmi, with Dwayne Smith scoring 72 runs from 59 balls. A loss to Lahore followed.

With the tournament moving back to Dubai, Islamabad beat Quetta Gladiators despite Quetta being 148/1 chasing 166 after 16 overs. Late wickets led to a one-run victory for Islamad, ensuring the team of a play-off spot.

Pos	Team	Pld	W	L	NR	Pts	NRR
1	Peshawar Zalmi (C)	8	4	3	1	9	0.309
2	Quetta Gladiators (R)	8	4	3	1	9	0.166
3	Karachi Kings (3rd)	8	4	4	0	8	−0.098
4	Islamabad United (4th)	8	4	4	0	8	−0.139
5	Lahore Qalandars	8	3	5	0	6	−0.223

Source: ESPNcricinfo
- Top 4 teams qualified for the playoffs
- Advanced to Qualifier
- Advanced to Eliminator 1

Notes:

- C = Champions;
- R = Runner-up;
- (x) = Position at the end of the tournament;
