= 2017 Karachi Kings season =

Pakistani franchise cricket team

Karachi Kings
2017 season
- Coach: Mickey Arthur
- Captain: Kumar Sangakkara
- PSL 2017: Playoffs (3rd)
- Most runs: Babar Azam (291)
- Most wickets: Sohail Khan (16)

The Karachi Kings is a franchise cricket team that represents Karachi in the Pakistan Super League. They are one of the five teams that had a competition in the 2017 Pakistan Super League. The team was captained by Kumar Sangakkara, and they stand on third position after winning four matches from their eight matches in the PSL 2017.

== Squad ==
Kumar Sangakkara and Babar Azam joined Karachi for the second season of the PSL whilst Azhar Mehmood signed as a coach. Sohail Tanvir was traded for Chris Gayle of Lahore Qalandars during the off-season trade window. During the 2017 PSL players draft Karachi retained Shoaib Malik, Imad Wasim, Ravi Bopara, Mohammad Amir, Sohail Khan, Saifullah Bangash, and Shahzaib Hasan. The team added nine players to the squad, including Kieron Pollard, Mahela Jayawardena and Ryan McLaren.

Name	Nationality	Batting style	Bowling style	Year signed	Notes
Batsmen
Babar Azam	Pakistan	Right-handed	Right-arm off spin	2017	
Chris Gayle	West Indies	Left-handed	Right-arm offbreak	2017	Overseas
Khurram Manzoor	Pakistan	Right-handed	Right-arm offbreak	2017	
Mahela Jayawardene	Sri Lanka	Right-handed	Right-arm medium	2017	Overseas
Shahzaib Hasan	Pakistan	Right-handed	Right-arm offbreak	2016	
All-rounders
Hasan Mohsin	Pakistan	Right-handed	Right-arm medium	2017	
Imad Wasim	Pakistan	Left-handed	Slow left-arm orthodox	2016	
Ryan McLaren	South Africa	Left-handed	Right-arm medium-fast	2017	Overseas
Kashif Bhatti	Pakistan	Right-handed	Slow left-arm orthodox	2017	
Ravi Bopara	England	Right-handed	Right-arm medium-fast	2016	Overseas
Shoaib Malik	Pakistan	Right-handed	Right-arm off spin	2016	
Kieron Pollard	West Indies	Right-handed	Right-arm medium-fast	2017	Overseas
Wicket-keepers
Kumar Sangakkara	Sri Lanka	Left-handed	—	2017	Overseas, Captain
Saifullah Bangash	Pakistan	Right-handed	—	2016	
Bowlers
Abrar Ahmed	Pakistan	Left-handed	Right-arm leg spin	2017	
Mohammad Amir	Pakistan	Left-handed	Left-arm fast	2016	
Rahat Ali	Pakistan	Right-handed	Left-arm fast	2018	
Sohail Khan	Pakistan	Right-handed	Right-arm fast	2016	
Usama Mir	Pakistan	Right-handed	Right-arm leg spin	2016	
Usman Khan	Pakistan	Right-handed	Left-arm medium-fast	2017	
Abdul Ameer	Pakistan	Left-handed	Left-arm medium-fast	2017	

== Kit manufacturers and sponsors ==
Kit manufacturer	Shirt sponsor (chest)	Shirt sponsor (back)	Chest branding	Sleeve branding
AJ Sports	Bahria Town	Bridge Power Batteries	The Arkadians	Oye Hoye Chips, Shield, Vital Tea

Playing kit

== Pakistan Super League ==
In their first game, Karachi Kings lost to Peshawar Zalmi by 7 wickets in one-sided affair that saw them post a target of just 118 in their 20 overs. In the following game, against the Quetta Gladiators, the Kings failed to defend 160 and lost by 7 wickets yet again. Even as the tournament progressed to Sharjah, the Kings continued their losing streak. Facing a loss this time to arch-rivals, Lahore Qalandars. The match was closely fought and a partnership of 101 runs between veterans Kumar Sangakkara and Shoaib Malik almost won it for the Kings. But in the end they fell short of the target of 180 by 7 runs. But in the next game, against defending champions Islamabad United. the team finally managed to put themselves on the points table. The win came through the Duckworth-Lewis method as the Kings were ahead of the par score by 8 runs when returning rain forced to abandon the already 13-over match. In their final game of the Sharjah leg, the Kings continued their winning streak to get past Peshawar Zalmi in a thrilling contest. Setting up a target of 175, the Kings had the Zalmis reduced to 69–6 before Shahid Afridi and Darren Sammy combined in a 70-run partnership that almost won the game for the Zalmis. However, the King's bowling prevailed in the end to give their team a 9-run victory.

As the tournament moved back to Dubai, the Kings couldn't continue their winning streak and lost to table-toppers, Quetta Gladiators, by 6 wickets. Batting first, the Kings set a target of 155 runs, which they were unable to defend despite a 3-wicket-over from pacer Sohail Khan. This loss pushed the Karachi Kings to the bottom of the table once again. However, in the next game, which had become a must-win for both participating teams, the Kings managed to prevail over the Lahore Qalandars in a thrilling last-ball finish. Chasing 156, the team required 10 runs from the last two balls, which Kieron Pollard surpassed with back-to-back sixes to keep his team alive in the tournament. They qualified for Eliminator, where they defeated Islamabad United to advance to Qualifier 2.

=== Season standings ===
Karachi Kings finished third in the points table of 2017 Pakistan Super League.

Pos	Team	Pld	W	L	NR	Pts	NRR
1	Peshawar Zalmi (C)	8	4	3	1	9	0.309
2	Quetta Gladiators (R)	8	4	3	1	9	0.166
3	Karachi Kings (3rd)	8	4	4	0	8	−0.098
4	Islamabad United (4th)	8	4	4	0	8	−0.139
5	Lahore Qalandars	8	3	5	0	6	−0.223

Source: ESPNcricinfo
- Top 4 teams qualified for the playoffs
- Advanced to Qualifier
- Advanced to Eliminator 1

Notes:

- C = Champions;
- R = Runner-up;
- (x) = Position at the end of the tournament;
