= 2017 Pakistan Super League players draft =

2nd season of the Pakistan Super League

The Player Draft for the 2nd season of the Pakistan Super League was held at Dubai on 19 October 2016. A total of 414 players, including Pakistani and foreign cricketers, were divided into five different categories: Platinum, Diamond, Gold, Silver and Emerging. The salary-spending cap for a franchise was US$1.2 million, including the signing of players, coaches and support staff. Each team was allowed to pick eight foreign and 12 domestic players in a squad of up to 20.

== Player contracts and salaries ==
Each player who participates in the PSL is categorized in a group according to their "value", from Platinum class players at the top end through to Emerging class players at the bottom. Salaries in the league are generally determined by the category the player falls into. During the 2017 Pakistan Super League, Platinum class players would earn a base salary of US$140,000, Diamond class players US$70,000, Gold class players $50,000, Silver class $25,000 and Emerging players $10,000.

Supplementary players are picked by teams but are not paid unless they join the squad for the tournament at which point their contracts will commence. For Supplementary players there is no contractual base salary.

== Transfers ==
The Pakistan Super League player transfer window was between 15 July and 15 September 2016. The following transfers took place.

Player	From	To
Chris Gayle	Lahore Qalandars	Karachi Kings
Sohail Tanvir	Karachi Kings	Lahore Qalandars
Babar Azam	Islamabad United	Karachi Kings
Sohaib Maqsood	Lahore Qalandars	Peshawar Zalmi
Aamer Yamin	Peshawar Zalmi	Lahore Qalandars
Shakib Al Hasan	Karachi Kings	Peshawar Zalmi

== Retained players ==
Following is the list of players retained by their franchises from the previous season.

Category	Islamabad United	Quetta Gladiators	Peshawar Zalmi	Karachi Kings	Lahore Qalandars
Platinum	Misbah-ul-Haq	Sarfraz Ahmed	Shahid Afridi	Shoaib Malik	Umar Akmal
Platinum	Shane Watson	Kevin Pieterson	Wahab Riaz	Chris Gayle (Note: Acquired by trade before draft)	
Platinum	Andre Russell	Ahmed Shahzad			
Diamond	Sharjeel Khan	Luke Wright	Darren Sammy	Mohammad Amir	Dwayne Bravo
Diamond	Mohammad Irfan	Anwar Ali	Mohammad Hafeez	Ravi Bopara	Sohail Tanvir
Diamond	Samuel Badree		Shakib Al Hasan		
Gold	Khalid Latif	Umar Gul	Tamim Iqbal	Imad Wasim	Mohammad Rizwan
Gold	Mohammad Sami	Zulfiqar Babar	Kamran Akmal	Babar Azam	Cameron Delport
Gold	Brad Haddin				
Silver	Sam Billings	Mohammad Nawaz	Junaid Khan	Sohail Khan	Azhar Ali
Silver	Saeed Ajmal	Asad Shafiq	Imran Khan	Shahzaib Hassan	Zafar Gohar
Silver	Asif Ali	Saad Nasim	Sohaib Maqsood	Saifullah Bangash	Aamer Yamin
Silver	Rumman Raees	Mohammad Nabi			
Silver	Imran Khalid				
Emerging	Amad Butt		Hassan Ali		
Emerging	Hussain Talat		Mohammad Asghar		
Supplementary	Dwayne Smith	Bismillah Khan		Usama Mir	

== New picks ==
Following is the list of players picked by different teams.

Category	Islamabad United	Quetta Gladiators	Peshawar Zalmi	Karachi Kings	Lahore Qalandars
Platinum			Eoin Morgan	Kieron Pollard	Brendon McCullum
Platinum					Sunil Narine
Diamond		Carlos Brathwaite		Kumar Sangakkara	Yasir Shah
Gold		Tymal Mills	Chris Jordan	Ryan McLaren	Anton Devcich
Silver		Umar Amin	Ifthikhar Ahmed	Khurram Manzoor	Fakhar Zaman
Silver			Haris Sohail	Kashif Bhatti	Bilawal Bhatti
Emerging		Hasan Khan		Abdul Ameer	Ghulam Mudassar
Emerging		Noor Wali		Abrar Ahmed	Usman Qadir
Supplementary (Note: Supplementary players are those who are picked by their teams as extra players and whose contracts will start only after they join their teams.)	Ben Duckett	David Willey	Alex Hales	Mahela Jayawardene	Grant Elliott
Supplementary	Shadab Khan	Rovman Powell	Mohammad Shahzad	Rahat Ali	Shaun Tait
Supplementary	Zohaib Khan	Mir Hamza	Irfan Khan	Ammad Alam	Saif Badar
Supplementary			Khushdil Shah		Mohammad Irfan

== Replacements ==
Player	Team	Replaced with
Carlos Brathwaite	Quetta Gladiators	Thisara Perera
David Willey	Quetta Gladiators	Rilee Rossouw
Rovman Powell	Quetta Gladiators	Nathan McCullum
Mohammad Nabi	Quetta Gladiators	Mahmudullah
Abrar Ahmed	Karachi Kings	Usman Khan
Anton Devcich	Lahore Qalandars	James Franklin
Jaahid Ali	Lahore Qalandars	Chris Green
Dwayne Bravo	Lahore Qalandars	Jason Roy
Andre Russell	Islamabad United	Steven Finn
Ben Duckett	Islamabad United	Nicholas Pooran
Alex Hales	Peshawar Zalmi	Marlon Samuels
Shakib Al Hasan	Peshawar Zalmi	Samit Patel
