= 2017 Lahore Qalandars season =

Cricket team in the Pakistan Super League

Lahore Qalandars
2017 season
- Coach: Paddy Upton
- Captain: Brendon McCullum
- Ground(s): Gaddafi Stadium
- PSL 2017: 5th
- Most runs: Fakhar Zaman (177)
- Most wickets: Sunil Narine (10)

The Lahore Qalandars is a franchise cricket team that represents Lahore in the Pakistan Super League. They are one of the five teams that had a competition in the 2017 Pakistan Super League. The team was captained by Brendon McCullum, and they won three matches from their eight matches in the PSL 2017. They stand on fifth position and as a result they were eliminated in group stage.

== Squad ==
Lahore Qalandars icon player in the first season of the PSL Chris Gayle was traded for Sohail Tanvir of the Karachi Kings during the off-season trade window. Sohaib Maqsood was also traded for Aamer Yamin of Peshawar Zalmi. In September 2016, the team signed New Zealand's former captain Brendon McCullum as their new captain.

During the 2017 PSL players draft, Lahore picked a number of new players, including bowlers Yasir Shah and Sunil Narine. Later Dwayne Bravo and Anton Devcich were replaced with Jason Roy and James Franklin while Shaun Tait was replaced with Chris Green.

Name	Nationality	Batting style	Bowling style	Year signed	Notes
Saif Badar	Pakistan	Right-handed	Legbreak	2017	
Azhar Ali	Pakistan	Right-handed	Legbreak	2016	
Brendon McCullum	New Zealand	Right-handed	Right-arm medium	2017	Overseas/Captain
Umar Akmal	Pakistan	Right-handed	Right-arm off-spin	2016	
Jason Roy	England	Right-handed	Right-arm medium	2017	Overseas
Cameron Delport	South Africa	Left-handed	Right-arm medium	2016	Overseas
Fakhar Zaman	Pakistan	Left-handed	Left-arm orthodox spin	2017	
All-rounders
Bilawal Bhatti	Pakistan	Right-handed	Right-arm fast	2017	
Usman Qadir	Pakistan	Left-handed	Leg-break	2017	
James Franklin	New Zealand	Left-handed	Left-arm medium-fast	2017	Overseas
Sohail Tanvir	Pakistan	Left-handed	Left-arm medium-fast	2017	
Aamer Yamin	Pakistan	Right-handed	Right-arm medium-fast	2017	
Grant Elliott	New Zealand	Right-handed	Right-arm fast-medium	2017	Overseas
Wicket-keepers
Mohammad Rizwan	Pakistan	Right-handed		2016	
Bowlers
Ghulam Mudassar	Pakistan	Right-handed	Left-arm fast-medium	2017	
Chris Green	Australia	Right-handed	Right-arm off-break	2017	Overseas
Sunil Narine	West Indies	Left-handed	Right-arm off-spin	2017	Overseas
Yasir Shah	Pakistan	Right-handed	Leg-spin	2017	
Zafar Gohar	Pakistan	Left-handed	Slow left-arm orthodox	2016	
Mohammad Irfan	Pakistan	Right-handed	Right-arm fast	2017	

== Kit manufacturers and sponsors ==
Kit manufacturer	Shirt sponsor (chest)	Shirt sponsor (back)	Chest branding	Sleeve branding
Millat Sports	Jazz	Al-Karam Textiles	Geo News	QALCO, Huawei, Royal Palm

Playing kit

== Pakistan Super League ==
In their opening game of the 2017 season, Lahore Qalandars lost a closely fought match to the Quetta Gladiators. In pursuit of 137, they managed 128 before being bowled out in the penultimate over. The team bounced back in the next match by beating defending champions, Islamabad United. A partnership of 71 runs between Jason Roy and Umar Akmal set up the Qalandar's chase of 159 before a quick cameo of 26(12) by Sunil Narine finished the game. However, in the following game, against Peshawar Zalmi, the Qalandars collapsed to 59 all-out inside 11 overs – the second shortest innings in T20 cricket history. But, Yasir Shah took 4 wickets for 7 runs in the defense to almost take his team to victory before the Zalmis prevailed by 3-wickets.

As the tournament progressed to Sharjah, the Qalandars registered their second win on the trot. That too against arch-rivals, Karachi Kings. The match was hard-fought between the two teams before the Qalandars prevailed by 7 runs in the final over. Fakhar Zaman, who was also adjudged man-of-the-match, set up his team's target of 180 through his quick-fire innings of 56(36). But in the next game, against Quetta Gladiators, the Qalandars were unable to defend a target of 201 despite being in control for most of the match. They allowed 78 runs to be leaked from the last 3.5 overs to end up on the losing team. However, following this loss, the Qalandars won against Islamabad United by 1-wicket in a tense contest that saw them chase 146 runs in 19.3 overs. Umar Akmal anchored his team's innings by scoring 66 off 42 balls before Grant Elliott finished the chase with a six over midwicket.

As the tournament shifted back to Dubai, the Qalandars suffered back to back defeats against Peshawar Zalmi and arch-rivals, Karachi Kings. Against the Zalmis, the team couldn't chase down 167 after a drastic collapse from 38–1 to 43–6 and fell short by 17 runs. Following this, the Qalandars lost a must-win game against the Kings by 5-wickets. After putting up a respectable target of 156 on board, the team leaked 14-runs from the final over – including sixes on the last two balls to end up on the losing team. These two loses meant that the Qalandars finished at the bottom of the table after the league stage and were, in return, knocked out from the play-off proceedings for the second consecutive year.

=== Season standings ===
Lahore Qalandars finished fifth in the points table of 2017 Pakistan Super League.

Pos	Team	Pld	W	L	NR	Pts	NRR
1	Peshawar Zalmi (C)	8	4	3	1	9	0.309
2	Quetta Gladiators (R)	8	4	3	1	9	0.166
3	Karachi Kings (3rd)	8	4	4	0	8	−0.098
4	Islamabad United (4th)	8	4	4	0	8	−0.139
5	Lahore Qalandars	8	3	5	0	6	−0.223

Source: ESPNcricinfo
- Top 4 teams qualified for the playoffs
- Advanced to Qualifier
- Advanced to Eliminator 1

Notes:

- C = Champions;
- R = Runner-up;
- (x) = Position at the end of the tournament;
