= 2017 Pakistan Super League final =

Tournament final

2017 Pakistan Super League Final
- Event: 2017 Pakistan Super League
Peshawar Zalmi	Quetta Gladiators
Peshawar Zalmi team colors	Quetta Gladiators team colors
148/6	90
20 overs	16.3 overs
- Peshawar Zalmi won by 58 runs
- Date: 5 March 2017
- Venue: Gaddafi Stadium, Lahore
- Player of the match: Darren Sammy (Peshawar Zalmi)
- Umpires: Ranmore Martinesz; Ahsan Raza
- Attendance: 27,000

The 2017 Pakistan Super League Final was a Twenty20 cricket match played on 5 March 2017 at the Gaddafi Stadium in Lahore, Pakistan to determine the winner of the 2017 Pakistan Super League. The match was contested between Quetta Gladiators and Peshawar Zalmi with Peshawar winning by 58 runs. Darren Sammy, the Zalmi captain, was awarded the man of the match award.

The final was the first time that a match in the Pakistan Super League (PSL) had taken place in Pakistan with the league in its second year. The security situation in the country meant that many overseas players were reluctant to travel to Pakistan for an extended period of time after international cricket matches had stopped being staged in the country for several years after the 2009 attack on the Sri Lanka national cricket team in Lahore. All matches other than the final took place in the United Arab Emirates.

== Route to the final ==
During the group stage of the 2017 Pakistan Super League (PSL) each team played eight matches, two against each of the other teams contesting the competition. All matches were played in the United Arab Emirates due to the security situation in Pakistan. The top four teams progressed to the playoff stage. Peshawar Zalmi and Quetta Gladiators finished the group stage in first and second positions respectively, with both teams winning four of their matches, losing three. One match between the two teams was abandoned due to rain with each team receiving one point as a result. Peshawar were awarded first place in the points table based on a better net run rate than Quetta.

Quetta chased the tournament's highest total, 200 against Lahore Qalandars in their group match.

=== Group stage matches ===
The two teams played each other twice in the round-robin stage of the tournament. The first match, held in Sharjah on 17 February, was first reduced to 16 overs per side due to rain before the start of the match. Peshawar completed their innings, scoring 117 runs for the loss of three wickets from their 16 overs but, following further rain, the match was abandoned without any of Quetta's innings being possible. Tamim Iqbal top scored in the Peshawar innings with 62 not out from 46 balls.

The second group-stage match between the two teams was held in Dubai on 25 February. The match was both teams' final group-stage match. Both teams had already qualified for the playoff stage and Quetta were leading the points table before the start of play. Quetta batted first, scoring 128 runs from their full 20 overs. Peshawar scored 130/8 from 19.2 overs, winning the match and moving above Quetta at the top of the table.

17 February 2017
Scorecard

Peshawar Zalmi; 117/3 (16 overs)	v	Quetta Gladiators

No result - match abandoned due to rain
Sharjah Cricket Stadium, Sharjah

25 February 2017 (D/N)
Scorecard

Quetta Gladiators; 128 (20 overs)	v	Peshawar Zalmi; 130/8 (19.2 overs)

Peshawar won by 2 wickets
Dubai International Cricket Stadium, Dubai

=== Playoff stage matches ===
As the two teams leading the points table, both teams met initially in the first qualifying final with the winner automatically progressing to the final of the competition. The match was held in Sharjah on 28 February. Quetta batted first and scored 200/7 with Ahmed Shehzad top-scoring with 71 runs from 38 balls. In reply Peshawar scored 199/9, losing by just one run.

28 February 2017 (D/N)
First qualifying final
Scorecard

Quetta Gladiators; 200/7 (20 overs)	v	Peshawar Zalmi; 199/9 (20 overs)

Quetta won by 1 run
Dubai International Cricket Stadium, Dubai

Peshawar moved on to the third qualifying final on 3 March, meeting Karachi Kings who had defeated defending champions Islamabad United in the second qualifying final after finishing third in the points table. Peshawar batted first, scoring 181/3 with Kamran Akmal scoring 104 runs, the second century in the history of the Pakistan Super League. Karachi were restricted to a total of 157/7 from their 20 overs, losing the match by 24 runs.

25 February 2017 (D/N)
Third qualifying final
Scorecard

Peshawar Zalmi; 181/3 (20 overs)	v	Karachi Kings; 157/7 (19.2 overs)

Peshawar won by 24 runs
Dubai International Cricket Stadium, Dubai

== Match ==
The final took place on 5 March at Gaddafi Stadium in Lahore, Pakistan. It marked the return of high-profile cricket to the country after the 2009 attack on the Sri Lanka national cricket team, which forced Pakistan to play all internal home games in the United Arab Emirates due to security concerns. The choice of Lahore to host the final was controversial due to the ongoing security situation in the country, in particular a series of bombings in the weeks leading up to the final. The Pakistan Cricket Board and Pakistan Super League purchased bullet proof buses to transfer players and officials to the stadium, and an extensive security and intelligence operation was mounted in Lahore. Teams were flown to Lahore on the day of the final and flew out again after the match was completed.

Overseas players were given the opportunity to opt-out of travelling to Pakistan for the final. Four of Quetta's overseas players chose to do so, including Kevin Pietersen, the team's icon player who was their first selection in the 2016 Pakistan Super League players draft. The league had put in place a system to allow teams to replace players who declined to travel to the final.

Demand for online tickets sales was high and all tickets were sold within an hour and long queues seeking tickets for the final were observed for two consecutive days. Ticketing revenues were more than Rs. 180 million.

A closing ceremony, featuring performances by Pakistani artists, preceded the game to mark the tournament's culmination. The match was followed around the world. It was viewed as a success in terms of showing resilience against terrorism.

Several celebrities including politicians and actors were also in attendance. According to the PSL, more Indians watched the final online compared to any other country. The PSL final attracted more viewership than any Pakistan–India match, with TV ratings of 21 points.

=== Report ===
Quetta won the toss and elected to field first. Peshawar scored 148 runs in their innings, starting well with Kamran Akmal scoring 40 runs off 32 balls at the top of the order. Quetta's Rayad Emrit took two wickets in the 17th over, leaving the score at 112/6 but Darren Sammy scored 33 runs in the last two overs to post a respectable total. In the Quetta innings, Peshawar's left-arm spinner Mohammad Asghar took three wickets for 16 which helped to reduce Quetta to just 90 runs all out in 16.3 overs. Peshawar's margin of victory was 58 runs. Sammy won the Player of the Match award.

== Scorecard ==
Notes:

- † indicates team captain
- * indicates not out

Toss: Quetta Gladiators won the toss and elected to field.

Peshawar Zalmi innings
Player	Status	Runs	Balls	4s	6s	Strike rate
Dawid Malan	b Emrit	17	12	1	1	141.66
Kamran Akmal	lbw Hasan Khan	40	32	6	1	125.00
Marlon Samuels	b Nawaz	19	17	2	1	111.76
Mohammad Hafeez	c Nawaz b Emrit	12	13	1	0	92.30
Khushdil Shah	st †Sarfraz b Hasan Khan	1	5	0	0	20.00
Iftikhar Ahmed	lbw Emrit	14	21	1	0	66.66
†Darren Sammy	*	28	11	1	3	254.54
Chris Jordan	*	8	9	1	0	88.88
Wahab Riaz						
Hasan Ali						
Mohammad Asghar						
Extras (b 4, lb 1, w 5); Total 148/6 (20 overs)				13	6	7.40 RR

Fall of wickets: 42/1 (Malan, 4.4 ov), 82/2 (K Akmal, 9.6 ov), 82/3 (Samuels, 10.1 ov), 86/4 (Khushdil, 11.3 ov), 112/5 (Hafeez, 16.3 ov), 112/6 (Iftikhar, 16.4 ov)

Quetta Gladiators bowling
Bowler	Overs	Maidens	Runs	Wickets	Econ	Wides	NBs
Zulfiqar Babar	4	0	21	0	5.25	0	0
Anwar Ali	4	0	43	0	10.75	3	0
Rayad Emrit	4	0	30	3	7.75	0	0
Mohammad Nawaz	4	0	15	1	3.75	1	0
Hasan Khan	4	0	34	2	8.50	1	0

Target: 149 runs from 20 overs at 7.45 RR

Quetta Gladiators innings
Player	Status	Runs	Balls	4s	6s	Strike rate
Morné van Wyk	run out (Hasan Ali)	1	7	0	0	14.28
Ahmed Shehzad	c Khushdil b Hasan Ali	1	5	0	0	20.00
Anamul Haque	c Jordan b Asghar	3	9	0	0	33.33
†Sarfraz Ahmed	st K Akmal b Hafeez	22	11	5	0	200.00
Sean Ervine	b Asghar	24	19	2	0	126.31
Saad Nasim	c Iftikhar b Wahab	4	6	0	0	66.66
Anwar Ali	c Iftikhar b Jordan	20	24	2	0	83.33
Mohammad Nawaz	st K Akmal b Asghar	0	1	0	0	0.00
Rayad Emrit	*	6	9	0	0	66.66
Hasan Khan	c †Sammy b Wahab	4	6	0	0	66.66
Zulfiqar Babar	b Hasan Ali	1	2	0	0	50.00
Extras (lb 3, w 1); Total 90 (16.3 overs)				9	0	5.45 RR

Fall of wickets: 1/1 (van Wyk, 1.3 ov), 5/2 (Anamul Haque, 3.1 ov), 13/3 (Shehzad, 4.2 ov), 29/4 (†Sarfraz, 5.4 ov), 37/5 (Saad Nasim, 7.2 ov), 72/6 (Ervine, 12.4 ov), 72/7 (Nawaz, 12.5 ov), 81/8 (Anwar Ali, 14.4 ov), 88/9 (Hasan Khan, 15.6 ov), 90/10 (Babar, 16.3 ov)

Peshawar Zalmi bowling
Bowler	Overs	Maidens	Runs	Wickets	Econ	Wides	NBs
Hasan Ali	3.3	0	13	2	3.71	0	0
Mohammad Asghar	4	0	16	3	4.00	0	0
Mohammad Hafeez	2	0	21	1	10.50	0	0
Chris Jordan	3	0	16	1	5.33	0	0
Wahab Riaz	3	0	13	2	4.33	1	0
Darren Sammy	1	0	8	0	8.00	0	0

Result: Peshawar Zalmi won by 58 runs.

== Match Officials ==
Role	Name
On field Umpire	(Sri Lanka) Ranmore Martinesz
On field Umpire	(Pakistan) Ahsan Raza
TV Umpire	(Pakistan) Shozab Raza
Match Referee	(Sri Lanka) Roshan Mahanama
