= List of Pakistan Twenty20 International cricketers =

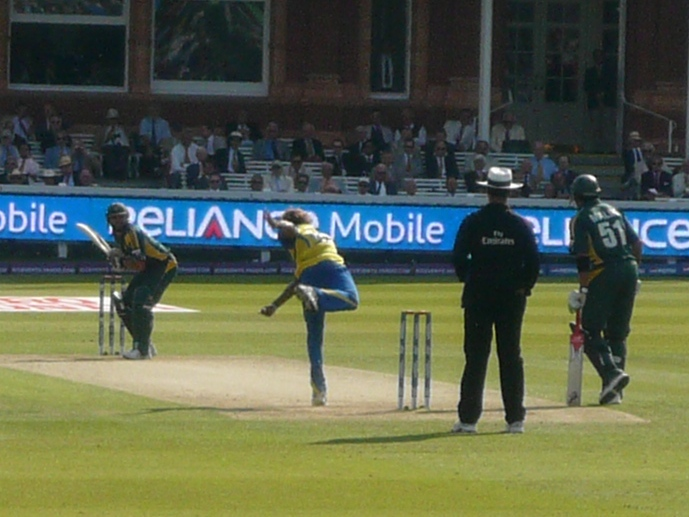
Pakistan defeated Sri Lanka in the 2009 ICC World Twenty20 Final at Lord's Cricket Ground.

A Twenty20 International (T20I) is an international cricket match between two representative teams, each having T20I status, as determined by the International Cricket Council (ICC), and is played under the rules of Twenty20 cricket. The first such match was played between Australia and New Zealand on 17 February 2005 which Australia won by 44 runs at Eden Park. As of February 2026, 125 players have represented the Pakistan cricket team since their first match in 2006.

Pakistan played their first T20I match at the County Cricket Ground, Bristol, on 28 August 2006, against England, winning the match by five wickets.

The first list comprises all members of the Pakistan cricket team who have played at least one T20I match. It is initially arranged in the order in which each player won his first Twenty20 cap. Where more than one player won his first Twenty20 cap in the same match, those players are listed alphabetically by surname. The second list is initially arranged in the order in which each captain led the team for the first time.

== Key ==
General

- ‡ – Captain
- † – Wicket-keeper
- First – Year of debut
- Last – Year of latest game
- Mat – Number of matches played

Fielding

- Ca – Catches taken
- St – Stumpings taken

Batting

- Inn – Number of innings batted
- NO – Number of innings not out
- Runs – Runs scored in career
- HS – Highest score
- Avg – Runs scored per dismissal
- * – Batsman remained not out

Bowling

- Balls – Balls bowled in career
- Wkt – Wickets taken in career
- BBI – Best bowling in an innings
- Avg – Average runs per wicket

Captains

- Won – Number of games won
- Lost – Number of games lost
- Tied – Number of games tied (Note: Matches that were tied and decided by bowlout are listed as tied.)
- Win% – Ratio of games won to those captained (Note: Percentage is worked out by counting tied games as half a win.)

== Players ==
- Statistics are corrected as of 1 February 2026.

Pakistan T20I cricketers
| General | | | | | Batting | | | | | Bowling | | | | Fielding | | Ref(s) |
| Cap | Name | First | Last | Mat | Runs | HS | Avg | 50 | 100 | Balls | Wkt | BBI | Avg | Ca | St | Ref(s) |
|---|---|---|---|---|---|---|---|---|---|---|---|---|---|---|---|---|
| 1 | Abdul Razzaq | 2006 | 2013 | 32 | 393 | 46* | 20.68 | 0 | 0 | 339 | 20 | 3/13 | 20.00 | 2 | 0 | |
| 2 | Inzamam-ul-Haq ‡ | 2006 | 2006 | 1 | 11 | 11* | — | 0 | 0 | — | — | — | — | 0 | 0 | |
| 3 | Kamran Akmal † | 2006 | 2017 | 58 | 987 | 73 | 21.00 | 5 | 0 | — | — | — | — | 28 | 32 | |
| 4 | Mohammad Asif | 2006 | 2010 | 11 | 9 | 5* | 0.00 | 0 | 0 | 257 | 13 | 4/18 | 26.38 | 3 | 0 | |
| 5 | Mohammad Hafeez ‡ | 2006 | 2021 | 119 | 2,514 | 99* | 26.46 | 14 | 0 | 1,261 | 61 | 4/10 | 22.75 | 30 | 0 | |
| 6 | Mohammad Yousuf | 2006 | 2010 | 3 | 50 | 26 | 16.66 | 0 | 0 | — | — | — | — | 1 | 0 | |
| 7 | Naved-ul-Hasan | 2006 | 2010 | 4 | 18 | 17* | 18.00 | 0 | 0 | 85 | 5 | 3/19 | 20.20 | 2 | 0 | |
| 8 | Shahid Afridi ‡ (Note: Also played Twenty20 International cricket for the ICC World XI. Only player's record for Pakistan is given above.) | 2006 | 2016 | 98 | 1,405 | 54* | 18.01 | 4 | 0 | 2,144 | 97 | 4/11 | 24.35 | 30 | 0 | |
| 9 | Shoaib Akhtar | 2006 | 2010 | 15 | 21 | 8* | 7.00 | 0 | 0 | 318 | 19 | 3/38 | 22.73 | 2 | 0 | |
| 10 | Shoaib Malik ‡ | 2006 | 2021 | 123 | 2,423 | 75 | 31.46 | 9 | 0 | 552 | 27 | 2/7 | 23.85 | 50 | 0 | |
| 11 | Younis Khan ‡ | 2006 | 2010 | 25 | 442 | 51 | 22.10 | 2 | 0 | 22 | 3 | 3/18 | 6.00 | 12 | 0 | |
| 12 | Abdur Rehman | 2006 | 2013 | 8 | 22 | 7 | 11.00 | 0 | 0 | 156 | 11 | 2/7 | 17.45 | 6 | 0 | |
| 13 | Imran Nazir | 2007 | 2010 | 25 | 500 | 72 | 21.73 | 3 | 0 | — | — | — | — | 11 | 0 | |
| 14 | Shabbir Ahmed | 2007 | 2007 | 1 | — | — | — | — | — | 12 | 0 | — | — | 0 | 0 | |
| 15 | Zulqarnain Haider † | 2007 | 2010 | 3 | 23 | 17 | 7.66 | 0 | 0 | — | — | — | — | 0 | 1 | |
| 16 | Iftikhar Anjum | 2007 | 2009 | 2 | — | — | — | — | — | 48 | 1 | 1/34 | 67.00 | 0 | 0 | |
| 17 | Misbah-ul-Haq ‡ | 2007 | 2012 | 39 | 788 | 87* | 37.52 | 3 | 0 | — | — | — | — | 14 | 0 | |
| 18 | Salman Butt | 2007 | 2010 | 24 | 595 | 74 | 28.33 | 3 | 0 | — | — | — | — | 3 | 0 | |
| 19 | Yasir Arafat | 2007 | 2009 | 13 | 91 | 17 | 13.14 | 0 | 0 | 236 | 16 | 3/18 | 19.75 | 1 | 0 | |
| 20 | Fawad Alam | 2007 | 2010 | 24 | 194 | 28 | 17.63 | 0 | 0 | 90 | 8 | 3/7 | 11.87 | 7 | 0 | |
| 21 | Umar Gul | 2007 | 2016 | 60 | 165 | 32 | 9.16 | 0 | 0 | 1,203 | 85 | 5/6 | 16.97 | 18 | 0 | |
| 22 | Sohail Tanvir | 2007 | 2017 | 56 | 194 | 41 | 11.41 | 0 | 0 | 1,196 | 53 | 3/12 | 26.67 | 7 | 0 | |
| 23 | Mansoor Amjad | 2008 | 2008 | 1 | — | — | — | — | — | 6 | 3 | 3/3 | 1.00 | 2 | 0 | |
| 24 | Wahab Riaz | 2008 | 2020 | 36 | 154 | 30* | 12.83 | 0 | 0 | 710 | 34 | 3/18 | 28.55 | 6 | 0 | |
| 25 | Shoaib Khan | 2008 | 2008 | 4 | 65 | 50 | 16.25 | 1 | 0 | — | — | — | — | 1 | 0 | |
| 26 | Sohail Khan | 2009 | 2017 | 5 | 1 | 1* | — | 0 | 0 | 90 | 5 | 2/13 | 24.60 | 0 | 0 | |
| 27 | Abdur Rauf | 2008 | 2008 | 1 | — | — | — | — | — | 18 | 0 | — | — | 0 | 0 | |
| 28 | Anwar Ali | 2008 | 2016 | 16 | 109 | 46 | 15.57 | 0 | 0 | 265 | 10 | 2/27 | 36.70 | 5 | 0 | |
| 29 | Khalid Latif | 2008 | 2016 | 13 | 237 | 59* | 21.54 | 1 | 0 | — | — | — | — | 4 | 0 | |
| 30 | Ahmed Shehzad | 2009 | 2019 | 59 | 1,471 | 111* | 25.80 | 7 | 1 | 6 | 0 | — | — | 15 | 0 | |
| 31 | Saeed Ajmal | 2008 | 2015 | 64 | 91 | 21* | 8.27 | 0 | 0 | 1,430 | 85 | 4/19 | 17.83 | 12 | 0 | |
| 32 | Mohammad Amir | 2009 | 2024 | 62 | 65 | 21* | 7.22 | 0 | 0 | 1,321 | 71 | 4/13 | 21.94 | 10 | 0 | |
| 33 | Shahzaib Hasan | 2009 | 2010 | 10 | 116 | 35 | 11.60 | 0 | 0 | — | — | — | — | 3 | 0 | |
| 34 | Umar Akmal † | 2009 | 2019 | 84 | 1,690 | 94 | 26.00 | 8 | 0 | — | — | — | — | 50 | 2 | |
| 35 | Imran Farhat | 2010 | 2011 | 7 | 76 | 19 | 10.85 | 0 | 0 | — | — | — | — | 3 | 0 | |
| 36 | Sarfaraz Ahmed †‡ | 2010 | 2021 | 61 | 818 | 89* | 27.26 | 3 | 0 | — | — | — | — | 36 | 10 | |
| 37 | Mohammad Sami | 2010 | 2016 | 13 | 21 | 8 | 21.00 | 0 | 0 | 276 | 21 | 3/16 | 18.42 | 3 | 0 | |
| 38 | Asad Shafiq | 2010 | 2012 | 10 | 192 | 38 | 19.20 | 0 | 0 | — | — | — | — | 3 | 0 | |
| 39 | Tanvir Ahmed | 2010 | 2010 | 1 | — | — | — | — | — | 18 | 1 | 1/13 | 13.00 | 0 | 0 | |
| 40 | Junaid Khan | 2011 | 2014 | 9 | 3 | 3* | — | 0 | 0 | 162 | 8 | 3/24 | 29.50 | 0 | 0 | |
| 41 | Mohammad Salman † | 2011 | 2011 | 1 | 5 | 5 | 5.00 | 0 | 0 | — | — | — | — | 1 | 1 | |
| 42 | Aizaz Cheema | 2011 | 2012 | 5 | 0 | 0* | — | 0 | 0 | 102 | 8 | 4/30 | 14.50 | 0 | 0 | |
| 43 | Rameez Raja | 2011 | 2011 | 2 | 24 | 23 | 12.00 | 0 | 0 | — | — | — | — | 0 | 0 | |
| 44 | Yasir Shah | 2011 | 2011 | 2 | 11 | 11* | — | 0 | 0 | 24 | 0 | — | — | 4 | 0 | |
| 45 | Awais Zia | 2012 | 2014 | 5 | 70 | 23 | 14.00 | 0 | 0 | — | — | — | — | 0 | 0 | |
| 46 | Hammad Azam | 2012 | 2013 | 5 | 34 | 21 | 11.33 | 0 | 0 | — | — | — | — | 2 | 0 | |
| 47 | Shakeel Ansar † | 2012 | 2012 | 2 | 0 | 0 | 0.00 | 0 | 0 | — | — | — | — | 1 | 1 | |
| 48 | Nasir Jamshed | 2012 | 2013 | 18 | 363 | 56 | 21.35 | 2 | 0 | — | — | — | — | 6 | 0 | |
| 49 | Raza Hasan | 2012 | 2014 | 10 | 18 | 13* | — | 0 | 0 | 228 | 10 | 2/14 | 21.90 | 2 | 0 | |
| 50 | Mohammad Irfan | 2012 | 2016 | 22 | 4 | 2* | — | 0 | 0 | 453 | 16 | 2/18 | 35.12 | 1 | 0 | |
| 51 | Umar Amin | 2013 | 2018 | 14 | 142 | 47 | 15.77 | 0 | 0 | — | — | — | — | 4 | 0 | |
| 52 | Zulfiqar Babar | 2013 | 2013 | 7 | 27 | 13 | — | 0 | 0 | 156 | 12 | 3/23 | 15.41 | 1 | 0 | |
| 53 | Asad Ali | 2013 | 2013 | 2 | — | — | — | — | — | 24 | 0 | — | — | 0 | 0 | |
| 54 | Haris Sohail | 2013 | 2019 | 14 | 210 | 52 | 19.09 | 2 | 0 | — | — | — | — | 3 | 0 | |
| 55 | Sohaib Maqsood | 2013 | 2021 | 26 | 273 | 37 | 13.65 | 0 | 0 | 6 | 0 | — | — | 7 | 0 | |
| 56 | Bilawal Bhatti | 2013 | 2015 | 9 | 23 | 13* | 11.50 | 0 | 0 | 156 | 5 | 2/36 | 51.00 | 1 | 0 | |
| 57 | Sharjeel Khan | 2013 | 2021 | 21 | 406 | 59 | 22.55 | 2 | 0 | — | — | — | — | 6 | 0 | |
| 58 | Usman Shinwari | 2013 | 2019 | 16 | 2 | 2* | — | 0 | 0 | 306 | 13 | 3/31 | 32.61 | 1 | 0 | |
| 59 | Saad Nasim | 2014 | 2014 | 3 | 44 | 25 | 22.00 | 0 | 0 | 6 | 0 | — | — | 1 | 0 | |
| 60 | Mohammad Rizwan ‡† | 2015 | 2024 | 106 | 3,414 | 104* | 47.41 | 30 | 1 | — | — | — | — | 55 | 12 | |
| 61 | Mukhtar Ahmed | 2015 | 2015 | 6 | 192 | 83 | 32.00 | 2 | 0 | 6 | 0 | — | — | 2 | 0 | |
| 62 | Imad Wasim | 2015 | 2024 | 75 | 554 | 64* | 15.82 | 1 | 0 | 1,536 | 73 | 5/14 | 21.75 | 22 | 0 | |
| 63 | Nauman Anwar | 2015 | 2015 | 1 | 18 | 18 | 18.00 | 0 | 0 | 6 | 0 | — | — | 0 | 0 | |
| 64 | Imran Khan | 2015 | 2015 | 3 | 0 | 0 | 0.00 | 0 | 0 | 72 | 2 | 2/35 | 53.00 | 3 | 0 | |
| 65 | Rafatullah Mohmand | 2015 | 2015 | 3 | 39 | 23 | 13.00 | 0 | 0 | — | — | — | — | 0 | 0 | |
| 66 | Aamer Yamin | 2015 | 2018 | 2 | 15 | 15* | — | 0 | 0 | 36 | 2 | 1/12 | 18.50 | 0 | 0 | |
| 67 | Khurram Manzoor | 2016 | 2016 | 3 | 11 | 10 | 3.66 | 0 | 0 | — | — | — | — | 0 | 0 | |
| 68 | Mohammad Nawaz | 2016 | 2026 | 91 | 896 | 45* | 19.06 | 0 | 0 | 1,640 | 94 | 5/18 | 20.77 | 41 | 0 | |
| 69 | Iftikhar Ahmed | 2016 | 2024 | 66 | 998 | 62* | 24.34 | 4 | 0 | 295 | 8 | 3/24 | 43.62 | 26 | 0 | |
| 70 | Babar Azam ‡ | 2016 | 2026 | 139 | 4,505 | 122 | 39.51 | 39 | 3 | — | — | — | — | 66 | 0 | |
| 71 | Hasan Ali | 2016 | 2025 | 57 | 147 | 23 | 13.36 | 0 | 0 | 1,155 | 72 | 5/30 | 23.30 | 15 | 0 | |
| 72 | Rumman Raees | 2016 | 2018 | 8 | 6 | 6* | — | 0 | 0 | 173 | 8 | 2/37 | 27.50 | 1 | 0 | |
| 73 | Shadab Khan ‡ | 2017 | 2026 | 117 | 891 | 52 | 18.95 | 1 | 0 | 2,317 | 118 | 4/8 | 24.05 | 42 | 0 | |
| 74 | Fakhar Zaman | 2017 | 2026 | 117 | 2,385 | 91 | 23.38 | 13 | 0 | 6 | 0 | — | — | 59 | 0 | |
| 75 | Faheem Ashraf | 2017 | 2026 | 80 | 554 | 51 | 13.19 | 1 | 0 | 1,161 | 61 | 4/23 | 24.96 | 25 | 0 | |
| 76 | Asif Ali | 2018 | 2023 | 58 | 577 | 41* | 15.18 | 0 | 0 | — | — | — | — | 21 | 0 | |
| 77 | Hussain Talat | 2018 | 2025 | 23 | 441 | 63 | 22.05 | 2 | 0 | 72 | 7 | 2/12 | 15.42 | 9 | 0 | |
| 78 | Shaheen Afridi ‡ | 2018 | 2026 | 98 | 302 | 33* | 13.72 | 0 | 0 | 2,121 | 128 | 4/22 | 21.28 | 26 | 0 | |
| 79 | Sahibzada Farhan | 2018 | 2026 | 39 | 922 | 80* | 24.26 | 8 | 0 | — | — | — | — | 16 | 0 | |
| 80 | Waqas Maqsood | 2018 | 2018 | 1 | — | — | — | — | — | 11 | 2 | 2/21 | 10.50 | 0 | 0 | |
| 81 | Imam-ul-Haq | 2019 | 2019 | 2 | 21 | 14 | 10.50 | 0 | 0 | — | — | — | — | 0 | 0 | |
| 82 | Mohammad Hasnain | 2019 | 2024 | 28 | 24 | 8* | 24.00 | 0 | 0 | 618 | 25 | 3/37 | 35.08 | 1 | 0 | |
| 83 | Khushdil Shah | 2019 | 2025 | 38 | 434 | 36* | 17.36 | 0 | 0 | 108 | 6 | 3/13 | 21.33 | 9 | 0 | |
| 84 | Muhammad Musa | 2019 | 2020 | 2 | — | — | — | — | — | 47 | 0 | — | — | 0 | 0 | |
| 85 | Ahsan Ali | 2020 | 2020 | 2 | 36 | 36 | 18.00 | 0 | 0 | — | — | — | — | 0 | 0 | |
| 86 | Haris Rauf | 2020 | 2025 | 94 | 143 | 34* | 8.41 | 0 | 0 | 2,009 | 133 | 4/18 | 21.10 | 29 | 0 | |
| 87 | Haider Ali | 2020 | 2023 | 35 | 505 | 68 | 17.41 | 3 | 0 | — | — | — | — | 8 | 0 | |
| 88 | Usman Qadir | 2020 | 2023 | 25 | 36 | 18* | 9.00 | 0 | 0 | 432 | 31 | 4/13 | 18.48 | 5 | 0 | |
| 89 | Abdullah Shafique | 2020 | 2023 | 6 | 64 | 41* | 12.80 | 0 | 0 | — | — | — | — | 3 | 0 | |
| 90 | Zahid Mahmood | 2021 | 2021 | 1 | — | — | — | — | — | 24 | 3 | 3/40 | 13.33 | 0 | 0 | |
| 91 | Danish Aziz | 2021 | 2021 | 2 | 37 | 22 | 18.50 | 0 | 0 | 18 | 2 | 2/29 | 14.50 | 0 | 0 | |
| 92 | Arshad Iqbal | 2021 | 2023 | 3 | 0 | 0 | 0.00 | 0 | 0 | 54 | 4 | 3/14 | 13.25 | 0 | 0 | |
| 93 | Azam Khan † | 2021 | 2024 | 14 | 88 | 30* | 8.80 | 0 | 0 | — | — | — | — | 5 | 0 | |
| 94 | Mohammad Wasim | 2021 | 2026 | 34 | 53 | 12* | 13.25 | 0 | 0 | 657 | 42 | 4/24 | 21.50 | 19 | 0 | |
| 95 | Shahnawaz Dahani | 2021 | 2022 | 11 | 16 | 16 | 16.00 | 0 | 0 | 212 | 8 | 2/37 | 40.00 | 1 | 0 | |
| 96 | Naseem Shah | 2022 | 2026 | 36 | 61 | 16 | 7.62 | 0 | 0 | 756 | 31 | 3/21 | 32.93 | 4 | 0 | |
| 97 | Shan Masood | 2022 | 2022 | 19 | 395 | 65* | 30.38 | 3 | 0 | — | — | — | — | 5 | 0 | |
| 98 | Aamer Jamal | 2022 | 2024 | 6 | 88 | 41 | 22.00 | 0 | 0 | 101 | 2 | 1/13 | 93.50 | 1 | 0 | |
| 99 | Mohammad Haris † | 2022 | 2025 | 35 | 555 | 107* | 17.34 | 1 | 1 | — | — | — | — | 24 | 5 | |
| 100 | Ihsanullah | 2023 | 2023 | 4 | 6 | 6* | — | 0 | 0 | 89 | 6 | 3/29 | 18.00 | 0 | 0 | |
| 101 | Saim Ayub | 2023 | 2026 | 61 | 1,228 | 98* | 21.92 | 6 | 0 | 480 | 24 | 3/35 | 23.83 | 24 | 0 | |
| 102 | Tayyab Tahir | 2023 | 2024 | 8 | 123 | 39* | 20.50 | 0 | 0 | — | — | — | — | 4 | 0 | |
| 103 | Zaman Khan | 2023 | 2024 | 10 | 8 | 8* | — | 0 | 0 | 189 | 7 | 1/4 | 33.71 | 3 | 0 | |
| 104 | Arafat Minhas | 2023 | 2024 | 4 | 60 | 25 | 30.00 | 0 | 0 | 72 | 4 | 2/11 | 15.50 | 1 | 0 | |
| 105 | Mirza Tahir Baig | 2023 | 2023 | 3 | 36 | 32* | 18.00 | 0 | 0 | — | — | — | — | 1 | 0 | |
| 106 | Omair Yousuf | 2023 | 2025 | 7 | 91 | 24 | 18.20 | 0 | 0 | — | — | — | — | 3 | 0 | |
| 107 | Qasim Akram ‡ | 2023 | 2024 | 4 | 41 | 20 | 13.66 | 0 | 0 | 23 | 3 | 2/5 | 7.66 | 2 | 0 | |
| 108 | Rohail Nazir † | 2023 | 2023 | 3 | 23 | 13 | 11.50 | 0 | 0 | — | — | — | — | 3 | 0 | |
| 109 | Sufiyan Muqeem | 2023 | 2025 | 19 | 26 | 10 | 5.20 | 0 | 0 | 380 | 27 | 5/3 | 14.74 | 4 | 0 | |
| 110 | Mubasir Khan | 2023 | 2023 | 1 | — | — | — | — | — | — | — | — | — | 0 | 0 | |
| 111 | Abbas Afridi | 2024 | 2025 | 24 | 135 | 22 | 12.27 | 0 | 0 | 417 | 38 | 3/17 | 15.52 | 6 | 0 | |
| 112 | Usama Mir | 2024 | 2024 | 5 | 7 | 5 | 2.33 | 0 | 0 | 120 | 5 | 2/21 | 35.00 | 2 | 0 | |
| 113 | Haseebullah Khan † | 2024 | 2024 | 2 | 36 | 24 | 12.00 | 0 | 0 | — | — | — | — | 1 | 0 | |
| 114 | Abrar Ahmed | 2024 | 2026 | 34 | 4 | 2 | 4.00 | 0 | 0 | 722 | 46 | 4/9 | 17.15 | 8 | 0 | |
| 115 | Irfan Khan | 2024 | 2025 | 14 | 189 | 37* | 27.00 | 0 | 0 | — | — | — | — | 8 | 0 | |
| 116 | Usman Khan † | 2024 | 2026 | 31 | 414 | 53 | 19.71 | 2 | 0 | — | — | — | — | 10 | 3 | |
| 117 | Salman Ali Agha ‡ | 2024 | 2026 | 45 | 856 | 76 | 25.17 | 7 | 0 | 108 | 5 | 1/7 | 28.40 | 17 | 0 | |
| 118 | Jahandad Khan | 2024 | 2025 | 8 | 29 | 17 | 7.25 | 0 | 0 | 108 | 7 | 2/30 | 30.14 | 1 | 0 | |
| 119 | Abdul Samad | 2025 | 2025 | 5 | 66 | 41* | 12.80 | 0 | 0 | — | — | — | — | 1 | 0 | |
| 120 | Hassan Nawaz | 2025 | 2025 | 25 | 457 | 105* | 20.77 | 2 | 1 | — | — | — | — | 16 | 0 | |
| 121 | Mohammad Ali | 2025 | 2025 | 3 | 1 | 1* | — | 0 | 0 | 42 | 1 | 1/34 | 86.00 | 0 | 0 | |
| 122 | Salman Mirza | 2025 | 2026 | 13 | 7 | 4* | 3.50 | 0 | 0 | 292 | 19 | 3/14 | 16.31 | 0 | 0 | |
| 123 | Ahmed Daniyal | 2025 | 2025 | 2 | 17 | 17 | 17.00 | 0 | 0 | 42 | 3 | 2/23 | 13.00 | 1 | 0 | |
| 124 | Usman Tariq | 2025 | 2026 | 3 | — | — | — | — | — | 64 | 8 | 4/18 | 7.50 | 1 | 0 | |
| 125 | Khawaja Nafay † | 2026 | 2026 | 2 | 47 | 26 | 23.50 | 0 | 0 | — | — | — | — | 1 | 1 | |

== T20I captains ==
Pakistan T20I captains
| No. | Name | First | Last | Played | Won | Lost | Tied+W (Note: Tie+W and Tie+L: Matches tied and then won or lost in a tiebreaker (bowlout or one-over-eliminator).) | Tied-L | No Result | Win% |
|---|---|---|---|---|---|---|---|---|---|---|
| 1 | Inzamam-ul-Haq | 2006 | 2006 | 1 | 1 | 0 | 0 | 0 | 0 | 100.00 |
| 2 | Younis Khan | 2007 | 2009 | 8 | 5 | 3 | 0 | 0 | 0 | 62.50 |
| 3 | Shoaib Malik | 2007 | 2019 | 20 | 13 | 6 | 0 | 1 | 0 | 67.50 |
| 4 | Misbah-ul-Haq | 2009 | 2012 | 8 | 6 | 2 | 0 | 0 | 0 | 75.00 |
| 5 | Shahid Afridi | 2009 | 2016 | 43 | 19 | 23 | 0 | 1 | 0 | 45.34 |
| 6 | Mohammad Hafeez | 2012 | 2014 | 29 | 17 | 11 | 1 | 0 | 0 | 60.34 |
| 7 | Sarfaraz Ahmed | 2016 | 2019 | 37 | 29 | 8 | 0 | 0 | 0 | 78.37 |
| 8 | Babar Azam | 2019 | 2024 | 85 | 48 | 29 | 0 | 1 | 7 | 62.17 |
| 9 | Shadab Khan | 2020 | 2023 | 6 | 2 | 4 | 0 | 0 | 0 | 33.33 |
| 10 | Qasim Akram | 2023 | 2023 | 3 | 1 | 2 | 0 | 0 | 0 | 33.33 |
| 11 | Shaheen Afridi | 2024 | 2024 | 5 | 1 | 4 | 0 | 0 | 0 | 20.00 |
| 12 | Mohammad Rizwan | 2024 | 2024 | 4 | 0 | 4 | 0 | 0 | 0 | 0.00 |
| 13 | Salman Ali Agha | 2024 | 2026 | 43 | 27 | 16 | 0 | 0 | 0 | 62.79 |
