= Noor Wali =

Pakistani cricketer (born 1996)

Personal information
- Born: 28 August 1996 (age 30); Karachi, Pakistan

Domestic team information
- Years: Team
- 2017–: Quetta Gladiators
- Source: Cricinfo, 18 December 2015

Noor Wali (born 28 August 1996) is a Pakistani cricketer. He made his first-class debut for Port Qasim Authority on 30 November 2015 in the 2015–16 Quaid-e-Azam Trophy.
