= Mohammad Irfan =

Former Pakistani cricketer

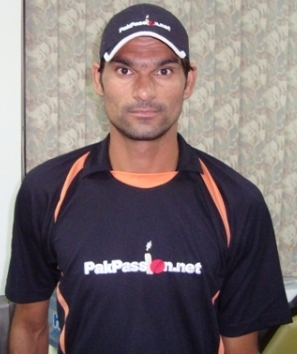
- Mohammad Irfan in 2010

Personal information
- Born: 6 June 1982 (age 44); Gaggo, Punjab, Pakistan
- Height: 7 ft 1 in (216 cm)
- Batting: Right-handed
- Bowling: Left-arm fast
- Role: Bowler

International information
- National side: Pakistan (2010–2019)
- Test debut (cap 212): 14 February 2013 v South Africa
- Last Test: 23 October 2013 v South Africa
- ODI debut (cap 178): 10 September 2010 v England
- Last ODI: 1 September 2016 v England
- ODI shirt no.: 76
- T20I debut (cap 50): 25 December 2012 v India
- Last T20I: 5 November 2019 v Australia

Domestic team information
- Years: Team
- 2009–2016: Khan Research Laboratories
- 2005–2014: Multan Tigers
- 2015: Lahore Lions
- 2015: Dhaka Dynamites
- 2016–2017: Islamabad United (squad no. 76)
- 2017–: WAPDA
- 2018–2020: Multan Sultans (squad no. 27)
- 2018: Barbados Tridents (squad no. 27)
- 2018: Balkh Legends
- 2019: Sylhet Sixers
- 2019–2020: Rajshahi Royals
- 2021: Peshawar Zalmi
- 2021: Mirpur Royals
- 2022: Quetta Gladiators
- 2024: Durdanto Dhaka (squad no. 76)

Career statistics
| Competition | Test | ODI | FC | LA |
|---|---|---|---|---|
| Matches | 4 | 60 | 54 | 130 |
| Runs scored | 28 | 48 | 290 | 180 |
| Batting average | 5.60 | 4.00 | 6.30 | 6.92 |
| 100s/50s | 0/0 | 0/0 | 0/0 | 0/0 |
| Top score | 14 | 12 | 37 | 22 |
| Balls bowled | 712 | 3,109 | 8,858 | 6,604 |
| Wickets | 10 | 83 | 184 | 179 |
| Bowling average | 38.90 | 30.71 | 26.80 | 29.16 |
| 5 wickets in innings | 0 | 0 | 10 | 1 |
| 10 wickets in match | 0 | 0 | 1 | 0 |
| Best bowling | 3/44 | 4/30 | 7/113 | 5/67 |
| Catches/stumpings | 0/– | 11/– | 10/– | 20/– |
- Source: Cricinfo, 28 July 2022

Mohammad Irfan (Punjabi, Urdu: محمد عرفان; born 6 June 1982) is a former Pakistani cricketer who has represented Pakistan in Test, ODI and T20 cricket. Known for his height of 7 ft 1 in (2.16 m), he is the tallest player to play first-class and international cricket.

== Early life ==
Irfan was born in the village of Gaggo Mandi in Central Punjab, having two sisters and four brothers, the brothers being all over 6 ft (1.8 m) tall, while his father is 6 ft 9 in (2.06 m) tall. In an interview, Irfan himself gives a height of 6 ft 10 in (2.08 m) for his father and 6 ft 6 in (1.98 m) for his mother.

Before playing professional cricket he worked in a plastic-pipe factory in order to support his family.

== Domestic and franchise career ==
=== First-class contract ===
After impressing coaches at the National Cricket Academy, Irfan got several offers from first-class teams including Habib Bank and ZTBL. However it was KRL opener, Azhar Ali, who convinced KRL coach Rashid Iqbal to give Irfan a trial with Khan Research Laboratories (KRL). Azhar had seen Irfan take 4 wickets against Pakistan A and had immediately called KRL telling them that Irfan would be a good fit for their team. Irfan went for the trial and got selected.

He made his first-class debut in the Quaid-e-Azam Trophy in October 2009 playing for Khan Research Laboratories. He bowled economically but was unable to take any wickets in a high scoring game. In his second first-class game, Irfan took 7–113 in the second innings and 9 wickets overall in the match. His first wicket in professional cricket was of young Pakistani international batsmen Ahmed Shehzad. He also took the wicket of Imran Farhat and injured Hasan Raza with a bouncer before taking his wicket.

Irfan continued to impress early on in his first-class career. In his third match, he grabbed 11 wickets to help his side to their first win of the championship. He recorded 5/27 in the first innings and 6/96 in the second innings.

Before he was offered a lucrative break in cricket, Irfan contemplated giving up the game and was working for a plastic pipe company. He confirmed his height as 7 ft 1 in (2.16 m) which makes him the tallest first-class cricketer of all time above county players Anthony Allom, Paul Dunkels and Will Jefferson, each individually measured at 6 ft 10 in (2.08 m).

=== T20 franchise career ===
Irfan announced that he had signed a memorandum of understanding with Kolkata Knight Riders (KKR) to represent them in the 2011 IPL Season. This deal was to valid only as long as the PCB and the BCCI give their approval. The main reason for Irfan being given a trial with KKR was because former Pakistani pace-bowler Wasim Akram recommended Irfan to the KKR management. Irfan's contract was to earn him $75,000 plus another $2,000 for every game he played. However the contract needed to be approved by the Board of Control for Cricket in India Irfan's contract also required approval from the Pakistan Cricket Board

On 3 June 2018, he was selected to play for the Edmonton Royals in the players' draft for the inaugural edition of the Global T20 Canada tournament. He was the joint-leading wicket-taker in the tournament for the Edmonton Royals, with six dismissals in six matches.

In August 2018, during the 2018 Caribbean Premier League, Irfan conceded just 1 run and grabbed 2 wickets from 4 overs, bowling for the Barbados Tridents against the St Kitts and Nevis Patriots. This was the most economical four-over spell in T20 cricket.

In September 2018, he was named in Balkh's squad in the first edition of the Afghanistan Premier League tournament. The following month, he was named in the squad for the Sylhet Sixers team, following the draft for the 2018–19 Bangladesh Premier League. In November 2019, he was selected to play for the Rajshahi Royals in the 2019–20 Bangladesh Premier League. Rajshahi Royals were the Bangladesh Premier League champions that season, and in the final, Irfan took 2/18 in his four over stint.

In November 2021, he was selected to play for the Colombo Stars following the players' draft for the 2021 Lanka Premier League.

Irfan played for Quetta Gladiators in the 2022 PSL.

== International career ==
=== Early days ===
Irfan worked in a pipe factory, earning just 300 rupees ($3) a week, before being spotted by former first-class cricketer Nadeem Iqbal in a club match, after which he made his debut for the Pakistan national cricket team at 28 years of age. Irfan was brought in to replace Pakistan's two prominent and core bowlers Mohammad Amir and Mohammad Asif, who were accused of spot fixing in 2010. This was a perfect opportunity for Irfan to shine for Pakistan as they looked to move forward without their two great bowlers. However, Irfan's ODI debut against England in 2010 saw a reduction by 9 overs in the match due to bad weather conditions. He finished the match with bowling figures of 0–37 off 5.3 overs, before going off the pitch with cramps. During this early stretch in his career, many were displeased by Irfan's performance. This was mainly due to his speed in the debut series against England; it underwhelmed many as it only showed 130–135 km/h (81–84 mph) on the velocity radar. To make matters worse, England had won the match by 24 runs. Irfan was dropped after the series and was not brought back until the India series on 25 December 2012.

Irfan made his Twenty20 International debut against India in the first Twenty20 International match on 25 December 2012 when the Pakistani team was touring India. Irfan was seen as a prominent figure in the series win against India as he emerged as the wild card that propelled Pakistan to victory. In this series he displayed marked improvement as his bowling speeds reached 145 km/h (90 mph), rising from the 135 km/h (84 mph) he had over two years ago. At 7 ft 1 in (2.16 m) and bowling at brisk pace, Irfan brings a new dimension to the Pakistan bowling attack. In a 2020 interview Irfan says how Virat Kohli was himself surprised, waiting for him to operate in the 130–135 km/h (81–84 mph) mark as told by his staff but Irfan eventually hitting speeds closer to 150 km/h (93 mph).

=== The emergence ===
Irfan's improvement did not go unnoticed, as the Pakistan selectors touted him "the surprise package" in South Africa in March 2013. Irfan did not disappoint as he consistently troubled the South African batsmen with his pace and height. Irfan finished the first innings with 3 wickets and 1 maiden in 21 overs, conceding 86 runs with an economy rate of 4.09. In the second innings Irfan was unable to take a wicket, returning figures of 0-35 off 10 overs.

=== 2017 suspension ===
Irfan was suspended from all forms of cricket on 29 March 2017 by the PCB for failing to report two approaches to corrupt the game during the 2017 Pakistan Super League. The suspension was backdated to 14 March 2017, the day that he was initially provisionally suspended. In addition, Irfan was fined PKR 1 million. Irfan can have his suspension lifted after six months if he assists the PCB in its ongoing investigations and doesn't breach the anti corruption code during that time.

=== Retirement ===
He announced his retirement from international cricket on 14 December 2024.
