= Sohail Khan (cricketer) =

Pakistani cricketer

Personal information
- Born: 6 March 1984 (age 42); Malakand, Khyber Pakhtunkhwa, Pakistan
- Nickname: Sohail Pathan
- Height: 6 ft 4 in (193 cm)
- Batting: Right-handed
- Bowling: Right-arm fast
- Role: Bowler

International information
- National side: Pakistan (2008–2017)
- Test debut (cap 191): 21 February 2009 v Sri Lanka
- Last Test: 26 December 2016 v Australia
- ODI debut (cap 164): 30 January 2008 v Zimbabwe
- Last ODI: 5 October 2016 v West Indies
- ODI shirt no.: 14
- T20I debut (cap 26): 10 October 2008 v Canada
- Last T20I: 18 October 2017 v World XI

Domestic team information
- Years: Team
- 2007/08–: Sindh
- 2007/08: Sui Southern Gas Corporation
- 2016–2017; 2019: Karachi Kings
- 2018: Lahore Qalandars
- 2020: Quetta Gladiators (squad no. 99)
- 2021: Multan Sultans
- 2022: Peshawar Zalmi

Career statistics
Competition	Test	ODI	FC	LA
Matches	9	13	121	88
Runs scored	252	25	1,954	674
Batting average	25.20	5.00	15.14	14.34
100s/50s	0/1	0/0	0/6	0/0
Top score	65	7	73	45*
Balls bowled	1,828	666	22,271	4,332
Wickets	27	19	516	162
Bowling average	41.66	31.42	24.64	23.88
5 wickets in innings	2	1	37	7
10 wickets in match	0	0	7	0
Best bowling	5/68	5/55	9/109	6/44
Catches/stumpings	2/–	3/–	27/–	15/–
- Source: ESPN Cricinfo, 6 September 2022

Sohail Khan (Pashto: سہیل خان; born 6 March 1984), also known as Sohail Pathan, is a Pakistani cricketer. A right-arm fast bowler, he gained instant recognition during his debut first-class season in 2007 when he broke Fazal Mahmood's record for the best bowling figures by a Pakistani in a first-class match. Shortly afterwards he made his international debut, in an ODI against Zimbabwe. Khan was part of the team for 2015 Cricket World Cup.

== Early and personal life ==
Sohail Khan was born and raised in Sakhakot, Malakand District in Khyber Pakhtunkhwa. He played tennis-ball cricket from a young age and bowled at a lively pace, something he says he owes to the muscle strength he built up from throwing stones and swimming in rivers and streams present in the mountainous environment. Realising his potential and on the advice of a friend, he moved to Karachi to play professional cricket.

His brother Murad Khan played some first-class cricket before turning to modelling.

== Domestic career ==
After playing some minor cricket in Karachi, Khan entered a speed hunt talent contest held by former Pakistan bowler Sikander Bakht and attained top position, his speed of 95 mph was also the third fastest in the country. A stint at Millat Club, in Malir, was followed by a place in Sindh Police's team. A few months later he was spotted by Dr. Shah, a renowned individual in Karachi's cricket fraternity, who convinced him to play for his team, A.O. Club. While playing for Shah's team, Khan was spotted by former Pakistan captain Rashid Latif who offered him a place at his cricket academy, which he accepted. During his time at the academy he also played for Deewan group, before joining Sui Southern Gas Company's (SSGC) cricket team. He picked up 21 wickets in his initial matches for SSGC, and the team was promoted to first-class cricket shortly afterwards.

Khan made his first-class debut for SSGC against Pakistan Customs in the 2007/08 Quaid-e-Azam Trophy. He impressed in his first innings with the ball, picking up a five-wicket haul for only 59 runs off 25 overs, and followed up with another five wicket haul in the second innings for 75 runs off 23 overs, to finish with a ten wicket haul on debut. In SSGC's final game of the competition, Khan broke Fazal Mahmood's long-standing record for the best bowling figures by a Pakistani in first-class cricket with a match haul of 16–189 off 52.5 overs against WAPDA at the Asghar Ali Shah Stadium, Karachi. He finished as the highest wicket-taker for the competition, with 65 wickets at an average of 18.43 including eight five wicket hauls and two ten wicket hauls.

Playing for Sind in the 2007/08 Pentangular Cup, Khan took four wickets in his team's opening match of the competition. He followed that performance up with consecutive five wicket hauls against Baluchistan and Federal Areas in the next two matches. Against Punjab he took six wickets, including Salman Butt, Misbah-ul-Haq and Kamran Akmal, helping Sind to victory in the tournament. Khan was subsequently named bowler of the tournament, leading with 23 wickets at an average of 16.69, meaning he ended his debut first-class season with 91 wickets from 14 matches.

He was the leading wicket-taker for United Bank Limited in the 2017–18 Quaid-e-Azam Trophy, with 51 dismissals in seven matches. He was the leading wicket-taker for Federal Areas in the 2017 Pakistan Cup, with seven dismissals in five matches.

In April 2018, he was named in Sindh's squad for the 2018 Pakistan Cup. In March 2019, he was named in Khyber Pakhtunkhwa's squad for the 2019 Pakistan Cup. In the final of the tournament, he scored 45 not out and took three wickets, and was named the player of the match.

In September 2019, he was named in Sindh's squad for the 2019–20 Quaid-e-Azam Trophy tournament.

=== PSL ===
He was bought for US$25,000 by Karachi Kings in 2016 drafts. He took just 4 wickets in 6 matches, but franchise owner and team management still showed faith in him as he was retained by kings for 2017 season winning the maroon cap and best bowler of the season award as he took 16 wickets in only 9 matches helping his side win many important matches.

== International career ==
Khan made his international debut for Pakistan against Zimbabwe in the fourth match of the five ODI series. He was expensive on the flat wicket, although he still managed to pick up one wicket, finishing with figures of 1/38 off 7 overs. He then played in the third and fourth ODIs against the visiting Bangladeshis in April 2008, going wicketless in the first and picking up three wickets in the second.

He was selected to replace Mohammad Asif in the 16-man squad for the tri-series in Bangladesh in June 2008, which involved the hosts and India, after Asif was detained at Dubai International Airport. On 7 January 2015, Chief Selector of PCB, Moin Khan announced the Pakistan Cricket team world cup squad of 2015 in which Sohail Khan was the surprise selection. He had been out of international team since 2011 and got the selection due to strong domestic performance in 2014 season and the fact that he remained one of the quickest bowlers in the country.

=== Cricket World Cup 2015 ===
Khan made a comeback in the team on 15 February in the Pakistan's important opening game vs their arch-rivals India in the world cup. He picked up 5–55 and he was on the hat-trick in the last over after dismissing the Indian skipper MS Dhoni and Ajinkya Rahane but it wasn't enough as the Indian side scored 300 for 7 wickets (300/7) and Pakistan were bowled out for 224 at the end of the 47th over with India winning the game by 76 runs. He scored 7 runs from 10 balls including a boundary.

Khan took important wickets during the tournament. In the rain affected match against South Africa, Pakistan bowled out for 222 before the 47th over. Khan bowled well, troubling the Proteas' batsmen. He took the crucial wicket of AB de Villiers, who threatened to take the game away. Pakistan won the match by 29 runs (D/L) and it was the first time that Pakistan won a World Cup match against South Africa.

Khan ended as Pakistan's second highest wicket taker in that tournament, with 12 wickets at an average of 30.33. After the tournament, he was ruled out from the team due to injury and was wasn't seen until the 2016 Test series against England.

=== Return to Test cricket ===
Khan made his Test return after five years since he made his debut. Selected for squad against England, he played the third test against the host and took his first five-fer. He took 7/207 in the match where Pakistan lost by 141 runs. In the fourth and final Test, he again took a five-fer which resulted in Pakistan's favor of winning the match and drawing the series 2-2.

In August 2017, he was named in Pakistan's squad for the 2017 Independence Cup, a Twenty20 International series against a World XI team. In June 2020, he was named in a 29-man squad for Pakistan's tour to England during the COVID-19 pandemic. In July, he was shortlisted in Pakistan's 20-man squad for the Test matches against England.
