= Saifullah Bangash =

Pakistani cricketer (born 1995)

Personal information
- Full name: Saifullah Khan Bangash
- Born: 21 March 1995 (age 31); Karachi, Sindh, Pakistan
- Batting: Right-handed
- Role: Wicket-Keeper

Domestic team information
- Years: Team
- 2015: Karachi Whites
- 2016–2019: Karachi Kings
- 2019-present: Sindh

Career statistics
| Competition | First-class | List A | T20 |
|---|---|---|---|
| Matches | 35 | 25 | 21 |
| Runs scored | 1172 | 331 | 142 |
| Batting average | 27.25 | 22.06 | 15.77 |
| 100s/50s | 1/7 | 0/1 | – |
| Top score | 148* | 56* | 34 |
| Balls bowled | – | – | – |
| Wickets | – | – | – |
| Bowling average | – | – | – |
| 5 wickets in innings | – | – | – |
| 10 wickets in match | – | – | – |
| Best bowling | – | – | – |
| Catches/stumpings | 107/8 | 31/10 | 16/5 |
- Source: ESPNcricinfo

Saifullah Bangash (born 21 March 1995) is a Pakistani cricketer who plays for Sindh. He has played for Pakistan national under-19 cricket team. He played for Karachi Kings in 2016 Pakistan Super League. He made his Twenty20 debut for Karachi Whites against Sialkot Region on 8 September 2015.

He played For Karachi University, Sui Southern Gas Corporation. He also played for Faisalabad Falcons in the US Open Cricket 2020.

== Career ==
In the first edition of the Pakistani Super League (PSL) in 2016, Bangash was signed by Karachi Kings as a player in the emerging category. He was signed for a reported $10,000. He was retained for the 2017 and the 2018 season.
