= Rumman Raees =

Pakistani cricketer

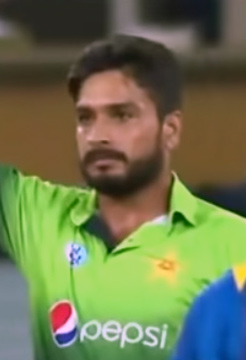
- Rumman Raees, October 2017

Personal information
- Full name: Rumman Raees Khan
- Born: 18 October 1991 (age 35); Karachi, Sindh, Pakistan
- Nickname: Prince
- Height: 5 ft 10 in (178 cm)
- Batting: Right-handed
- Bowling: Left-arm fast medium
- Role: Fast bowler

International information
- National side: Pakistan (2016–2018)
- ODI debut (cap 214): 14 June 2017 v England
- Last ODI: 19 January 2018 v New Zealand
- ODI shirt no.: 15
- T20I debut (cap 72): 27 September 2016 v West Indies
- Last T20I: 28 January 2018 v New Zealand
- T20I shirt no.: 15

Domestic team information
- Years: Team
- 2010–present: Karachi Blues
- 2016: Barisal Bulls
- 2016–2021; 2023–2026: Islamabad United (squad no. 11)
- 2022: Multan Sultans (squad no. 7)

Career statistics
Competition	ODI	T20I	FC	LA
Matches	9	8	44	52
Runs scored	27	0	835	236
Batting average	9.00	–	17.39	10.26
100s/50s	0/0	0/0	0/0	0/0
Top score	16	0*	43*	28*
Balls bowled	463	173	6714	2530
Wickets	14	7	138	79
Bowling average	33.14	27.50	24.33	26.77
5 wickets in innings	0	0	4	0
10 wickets in match	0	0	1	0
Best bowling	3/49	2/24	9/25	4/48
Catches/stumpings	2/–	1/–	18/–	19/–
Medal record
Men's Cricket
Representing Pakistan
Champions Trophy
Winner	2017 England & Wales
- Source: Cricinfo, 30 January 2021

Rumman Raees Khan (Urdu: رومان رئیس; born 18 October 1991) is a Pakistani cricketer who plays for United Bank Limited and the Pakistan cricket team. In August 2018, he was one of thirty-three players to be awarded a central contract for the 2018–19 season by the Pakistan Cricket Board (PCB).

== Personal life ==
The only brother of four sisters, he married in 2017.

== Domestic and T20 franchise career ==
In October 2017, during the 2017–18 Quaid-e-Azam Trophy match between United Bank Limited and Lahore Whites, he took nine wickets for 25 runs in the second innings. These were the second-best bowling figures in first-class cricket in Pakistan.

On 3 June 2018, he was selected to play for the Toronto Nationals in the players' draft for the inaugural edition of the Global T20 Canada tournament. In March 2019, he was named in Federal Areas' squad for the 2019 Pakistan Cup.

== International career ==
He was selected in Pakistan's squad for the 2016 ICC World Twenty20 tournament, but was dropped due to a knee injury. He made his Twenty20 International (T20I) debut for Pakistan against the West Indies on 27 September 2016.

Raees was initially not named in Pakistan's squad for the 2017 ICC Champions Trophy, but was added to the team as a replacement for the injured Wahab Riaz. He made his One Day International (ODI) debut in the semi-final against England on 14 June replacing the injured Mohammad Amir. He took two wickets for 44 runs including England's opener Alex Hales.
