= Sohaib Maqsood =

Pakistani cricketer

Personal information
- Born: 15 April 1987 (age 39); Multan, Punjab, Pakistan
- Height: 6 ft 2 in (1.88 m)
- Batting: Right-handed
- Bowling: Right-arm off-break
- Role: Batsman

International information
- National side: Pakistan (2013–2021)
- ODI debut (cap 92): 8 November 2013 v South Africa
- Last ODI: 13 July 2021 v England
- ODI shirt no.: 92
- T20I debut (cap 55): 23 August 2013 v Zimbabwe
- Last T20I: 3 August 2021 v West Indies

Domestic team information
- Years: Team
- 2005–2012: Multan Tigers
- 2013: Water and Power Development Authority
- 2016: Lahore Qalandars (squad no. 92)
- 2017: Peshawar Zalmi (squad no. 92)
- 2018, 2020–2022: Multan Sultans (squad no. 12 (previously no. 92))
- 2019: Peshawar Zalmi (squad no. 92)
- 2019/20–2022: Southern Punjab (squad no. 92)
- 2021: Muzaffarabad Tigers
- 2021: Dambulla Giants (squad no. 12)
- 2023: Islamabad United

Career statistics
Competition	ODI	T20I	FC	LA
Matches	29	26	79	130
Runs scored	781	273	4,656	4,440
Batting average	30.03	13.65	41.57	39.64
100s/50s	0/5	0/0	10/28	6/30
Top score	89*	37	222*	156
Balls bowled	54	6	1,622	1,657
Wickets	1	0	22	35
Bowling average	42.00	–	52.77	41.08
5 wickets in innings	0	–	0	0
10 wickets in match	0	–	0	0
Best bowling	1/16	–	4/62	4/49
Catches/stumpings	10/–	7/–	64/–	51/–
- Source: ESPN Cricinfo, 26 July 2022

Sohaib Maqsood (Punjabi, Urdu: صہیب مقصود; born 15 April 1987) is a Pakistani cricketer.

Due to his aggressive batting style and his 6’2'’ stature he is often compared to former Pakistan captain, batsman and fellow Multan native Inzamam-ul-Haq.

== Early life ==
He was born in Multan, Punjab to a retired teacher, who encouraged him to play cricket. In 2005, he represented the Pakistan under-19 cricket team in two unofficial Test matches against Sri Lanka under-19s, and became a probable selection for the 2006 Under-19 Cricket World Cup. However, a recurring back injury sidelined him from cricket for two years, a period during which Maqsood completed his undergraduate studies; he later completed a master's degree in sports sciences.

== Domestic career ==
He plays for the domestic team Multan Tigers in Haier T20 Cup and United Bank of Pakistan in Quaid-i-Azam Trophy. He led Pakistan A team in 5 unofficial One Day Internationals against UAE.

In April 2018, he was named the vice-captain of Federal Areas' squad for the 2018 Pakistan Cup. He was the leading run-scorer for Multan in the 2018–19 National T20 Cup, with 207 runs in seven matches. In March 2019, he was named in Federal Areas' squad for the 2019 Pakistan Cup.

In September 2019, he was named in Southern Punjab's squad for the 2019–20 Quaid-e-Azam Trophy tournament.

== International career ==
He made his ODI debut for Pakistan against South Africa on 8 November 2013 and scored 56 runs off 54 balls. His squad number is 92, which he chose as a tribute to the winning Pakistan team of the 1992 Cricket World Cup.

In September 2021, he was named in Pakistan's squad for the 2021 ICC Men's T20 World Cup. In November 2021, he was selected to play for the Dambulla Giants following the players' draft for the 2021 Lanka Premier League.
