= Saad Nasim =

Pakistani cricketer (born 1990)

Personal information
- Full name: Hafiz Saad Nasim
- Born: 29 April 1990 (age 36); Lahore, Punjab, Pakistan
- Batting: Right-handed
- Bowling: Legbreak
- Role: All-rounder

International information
- National side: Pakistan (2014–2015)
- ODI debut (cap 201): 17 April 2015 v Bangladesh
- Last ODI: 22 April 2015 v Bangladesh
- ODI shirt no.: 30
- T20I debut (cap 59): 5 October 2014 v Australia
- Last T20I: 5 December 2014 v New Zealand
- T20I shirt no.: 30

Domestic team information
- Years: Team
- 2007/08–2011/12: Lahore Ravi
- 2009/10–2012/13: WAPDA
- 2008/09–: Lahore Shalimar
- 2009/10–2015/16: Lahore Lions
- 2011: Pakistan A
- 2016–2017: Quetta Gladiators (squad no. 34)
- 2018–: Peshawar Zalmi (squad no. 34)
- 2019–2022: Central Punjab
- 2023–present: Lahore Whites

Career statistics
Competition	ODI	T20I	FC	LA
Matches	3	3	112	120
Runs scored	99	44	5,453	3,573
Batting average	49.50	22.00	69.83	39.70
100s/50s	0/1	0/0	8/32	4/26
Top score	77*	25	221	116*
Balls bowled	36	6	8,736	3,000
Wickets	0	0	127	82
Bowling average	–	–	44.25	30.51
5 wickets in innings	–	–	2	2
10 wickets in match	–	–	0	0
Best bowling	–	–	6/30	5/30
Catches/stumpings	0/–	1/–	105/–	41/–
- Source: ESPNcricinfo, 19 October 2023

Saad Nasim (Punjabi, Urdu: سعد نسيم; born 29 April 1990) is a Pakistani international cricketer. He is a right-handed middle-order batsman and legbreak spin bowler. He has played domestic cricket for WAPDA, Pakistan A and Lahore Lions. He represented Quetta Gladiators in the Pakistan Super League.

He made his Twenty20 International debut for Pakistan against Australia in the United Arab Emirates in October 2014. He made his One Day International debut against Bangladesh in April 2015.

He was the leading run-scorer for Lahore Blues in the 2017–18 Quaid-e-Azam Trophy, with 561 runs in ten matches.

In April 2018, he was named in Federal Areas' squad for the 2018 Pakistan Cup. He was the leading run-scorer for Lahore Blues in the 2018–19 Quaid-e-Azam One Day Cup, with 316 runs in seven matches. He was also the leading run-scorer for Lahore Blues in the 2018–19 Quaid-e-Azam Trophy, with 469 runs in ten matches.

In September 2019, he was named in Central Punjab's squad for the 2019–20 Quaid-e-Azam Trophy tournament. In January 2021, he was named in Central Punjab's squad for the 2020–21 Pakistan Cup.
