= 2022 Multan Sultans season =

Franchise cricket team in Pakistan Super League

Multan Sultans
2022 season
- Coach: Andy Flower
- Captain: Mohammad Rizwan
- PSL 2022: Runner-up
- Most runs: Mohammad Rizwan (546)
- Most wickets: Shahnawaz Dahani (17)

The Multan Sultans (often abbreviated as MS) is a franchise cricket team which represents the city of Multan in southern Punjab in the Pakistan Super League (PSL). The team made its PSL debut in 2018 season. The team is coached by Andy Flower, and remain under the captaincy of Mohammad Rizwan. The Sultans have previously lifted their maiden PSL title in 2021, making them the defending champions in 2022.

== Administration and coaching staff ==
Name	Position
Haider Azhar	Manager and COO
Andy Flower	Head coach
Abdul Rehman	Assistant coach
Mushtaq Ahmed	Spin bowling coach
Ottis Gibson	Fast bowling coach
Richard Halsall	Fielding and strength and conditioning coach
Cliff Deacon	Physio
Source:MS Team management,

== Squad ==
- Players with international caps are listed in **bold**
- Ages are given as of the first match of the season, 27 January 2022

No.	Name	Nat.	Birth date	Bat.	Bowl.	Joined	Notes
Batsmen
1	Aamer Azmat	Pakistan	26 November 1998 (aged 23)	Right-handed	Right-arm off break	2022	
12	**Sohaib Maqsood**	Pakistan	15 April 1987 (aged 34)	Right-handed	Right-arm off break	2021	
22	Rizwan Hussain	Pakistan	26 April 1996 (aged 25)	Left-handed	—	2022	
23	**Rilee Rossouw**	South Africa	9 October 1989 (aged 32)	Left-handed	Right-arm off break	2020	
25	**Johnson Charles**	West Indies	14 January 1989 (aged 33)	Right-handed	Left arm orthodox	2022	Full replacement for Odean Smith
94	**Shan Masood**	Pakistan	14 October 1989 (aged 32)	Right-handed	Left-arm medium-fast	2018	Vice-captain
All-rounders
8	**Tim David**	Singapore	16 March 1996 (aged 25)	Right-handed	Right-arm off-break	2022	
15	**David Willey**	England	28 February 1990 (aged 31)	Left-handed	Left-arm fast-medium	2022	
48	**Anwar Ali**	Pakistan	25 November 1987 (aged 34)	Right-handed	Right-arm fast-medium	2022	
55	Abbas Afridi	Pakistan	5 April 2001 (aged 20)	Right-handed	Right-arm medium-fast	2022	
72	**Khushdil Shah**	Pakistan	7 February 1995 (aged 26)	Left-handed	Slow left arm orthodox	2020	
	**Rovman Powell**	West Indies	23 July 1993 (aged 28)	Right-handed	Right-arm fast-medium	2022	
Wicket-keepers
16	**Mohammad Rizwan**	Pakistan	1 June 1992 (aged 29)	Right-handed	—	2021	Captain
Bowlers
5	Ihsanullah	Pakistan	11 October 2002 (aged 19)	Right-handed	Right-arm medium-fast	2022	
7	**Rumman Raees**	Pakistan	18 October 1991 (aged 30)	Right-handed	Left-arm fast-medium	2022	
11	**Shahnawaz Dahani**	Pakistan	5 August 1998 (aged 23)	Right-handed	Right-arm medium-fast	2021	
17	**Imran Khan**	Pakistan	15 July 1987 (aged 34)	Right-handed	Right-arm fast-medium	2021	
31	Asif Afridi	Pakistan	25 December 1986 (aged 35)	Left-handed	Slow left arm orthodox	2021	
40	**Blessing Muzarabani**	Zimbabwe	2 October 1996 (aged 25)	Right-handed	Right-arm fast-medium	2022	
99	**Imran Tahir**	South Africa	27 March 1979 (aged 42)	Right-handed	Right-arm leg break	2020	Mentor
	**Dominic Drakes**	West Indies	6 February 1998 (aged 23)	Left-handed	Left-arm medium-fast	2022	Partial replacement for Rovman Powell
	**Odean Smith**	West Indies	1 November 1996 (aged 25)	Right-handed	Right-arm medium	2022	
Source: MS squad

== Kit manufacturers and sponsors ==
Shirt sponsor (chest)	Shirt sponsor (back)	Chest branding	Sleeve branding
Pepsi	Fatima Group	Wolf777 News	Asia Ghee, Shell V-Power, Nishan-E-Haider Builders and Developers

Playing kit

== Season standings ==
=== Points table ===
Pos	Team	Pld	W	L	NR	Pts	NRR
1	Multan Sultans (R)	10	9	1	0	18	1.253
2	Lahore Qalandars (C)	10	6	4	0	12	0.765
3	Peshawar Zalmi (4th)	10	6	4	0	12	−0.340
4	Islamabad United (3rd)	10	4	6	0	8	−0.069
5	Quetta Gladiators	10	4	6	0	8	−0.708
6	Karachi Kings	10	1	9	0	2	−0.891

Source: ESPNcricinfo
- The top 4 teams qualified for the playoffs
- advanced to Qualifier
- advanced to Eliminator 1

== Regular season ==
Match 1
27 January 2022
19:30 (N)
Scorecard

Karachi Kings; 124/5 (20 overs)	v	Multan Sultans; 126/3 (18.2 overs)
Sharjeel Khan 43 (31); Imran Tahir 3/16 (4 overs)		Mohammad Rizwan 52* (47); Mohammad Nabi 2/17 (3.2 overs)

Multan Sultans won by 7 wickets
National Stadium, Karachi
Umpires: Aleem Dar (Pak) and Richard Illingworth (Eng)
Player of the match: Imran Tahir (Multan Sultans)

- Multan Sultans won the toss and elected to field.
- Ihsanullah (Multan Sultans) made his T20 debut.

Match 3
29 January 2022
14:30 (D/N)
Scorecard

Lahore Qalandars; 206/5 (20 overs)	v	Multan Sultans; 209/5 (19.4 overs)
Fakhar Zaman 76 (35); Khushdil Shah 1/14 (2 overs)		Shan Masood 83 (50); Shaheen Afridi 3/40 (4 overs)

Multan Sultans won by 5 wickets
National Stadium, Karachi
Umpires: Richard Illingworth (Eng) and Ahsan Raza (Pak)
Player of the match: Shan Masood (Multan Sultan)

- Multan Sultans won the toss and elected to field.

Match 7
31 January 2022
19:30 (N)
Scorecard

Multan Sultans; 174/4 (20 overs)	v	Quetta Gladiators; 168 (19.5 overs)
Shan Masood 88 (58); Mohammad Hasnain 2/27 (4 overs)		Ben Duckett 47 (32); Khushdil Shah 3/16 (4 overs)

Multan Sultans won by 6 runs
National Stadium, Karachi
Umpires: Aleem Dar (Pak) and Ahsan Raza (Pak)
Player of the match: Shan Masood (Multan Sultans)

- Quetta Gladiators won the toss and elected to field.

Match 8
1 February 2022
19:30 (N)
Scorecard

Multan Sultans; 217/5 (20 overs)	v	Islamabad United; 197 (19.4 overs)
Tim David 71 (29); Mohammad Wasim 1/39 (4 overs)		Shadab Khan 91 (42); Khushdil Shah 4/35 (4 overs)

Multan Sultans won by 20 runs
National Stadium, Karachi
Umpires: Michael Gough (Eng) and Shozab Raza (Pak)
Player of the match: Tim David (Multan Sultans)

- Islamabad United won the toss and elected to field.

Match 13
5 February 2022
19:30 (N)
Scorecard

Multan Sultans; 222/3 (20 overs)	v	Peshawar Zalmi; 165/8 (20 overs)
Mohammad Rizwan 82 (53); Shoaib Malik 1/17 (2 overs)		Ben Cutting 52* (31); Imran Tahir 3/25 (4 overs)

Multan Sultans won by 57 runs
National Stadium, Karachi
Umpires: Richard Illingworth (Eng) and Shozab Raza (Pak)
Player of the match: Mohammad Rizwan (Multan Sultans)

- Peshawar Zalmi won the toss and elected to field.

Match 16
10 February 2022
19:30 (N)
Scorecard

Multan Sultans; 182/7 (20 overs)	v	Peshawar Zalmi; 140 (19.3 overs)
Shan Masood 68 (49); Wahab Riaz 2/34 (4 overs); Salman Irshad 2/34 (4 overs)		Shoaib Malik 44 (31); Blessing Muzarabani 3/18 (4 overs)

Multan Sultans won by 42 runs
Gaddafi Stadium, Lahore
Umpires: Richard Illingworth (Eng) and Ahsan Raza (Pak)
Player of the match: Shan Masood (Multan Sultans)

- Peshawar Zalmi won the toss and elected to field.

Match 17
11 February 2022
19:30 (N)
Scorecard

Lahore Qalandars; 182/4 (20 overs)	v	Multan Sultans; 130 (19.3 overs)
Fakhar Zaman 60 (37); Anwar Ali 1/11 (2 overs)		Sohaib Maqsood 29 (26); Zaman Khan 3/21 (3.3 overs)

Lahore Qalandars won by 52 runs
Gaddafi Stadium, Lahore
Umpires: Aleem Dar (Pak) and Michael Gough (Eng)
Player of the match: Fakhar Zaman (Lahore Qalandars)

- Multan Sultans won the toss and elected to field.

Match 23
16 February 2022
19:30 (N)
Scorecard

Karachi Kings; 174/6 (20 overs)	v	Multan Sultans; 176/3 (19.3 overs)
Joe Clarke 40 (29); Shahnawaz Dahani 2/44 (4 overs)		Mohammad Rizwan 76 (56); Mir Hamza 2/24 (4 overs)

Multan Sultans won by 7 wickets
Gaddafi Stadium, Lahore
Umpires: Richard Illingworth (Eng) and Asif Yaqoob (Pak)
Player of the match: Mohammad Rizwan (Multan Sultans)

- Karachi Kings won the toss and elected to bat.

Match 25
18 February 2022
14:30 (N)
Scorecard

Multan Sultans; 245/3 (20 overs)	v	Quetta Gladiators; 128 (15.5 overs)
Mohammad Rizwan 83* (54); Mohammad Irfan 1/28 (3.3 overs)		Umar Akmal 50 (23); Khushdil Shah 2/17 (2.5 overs)

Multan Sultans won by 117 runs.
Gaddafi Stadium, Lahore
Umpires: Aleem Dar (Pak) and Rashid Riaz (Pak)
Player of the match: Rilee Rossouw (Multan Sultans)

- Multan Sultans won the toss and elected to bat.
- As a result of this match, Lahore Qalandars and Peshawar Zalmi both qualified for the play-offs.

Match 29
20 February 2022
19:30 (N)
Scorecard

Islamabad United; 105/7 (20 overs)	v	Multan Sultans; 111/4 (17.2 overs)
Muhammad Musa 26* (21); Imran Tahir 2/8 (4 overs)		Mohammad Rizwan 51* (42); Liam Dawson 3/16 (4 overs)

Multan Sultans won by 6 wickets
Gaddafi Stadium, Lahore
Umpires: Michael Gough (Eng) and Rashid Riaz (Pak)
Player of the match: Imran Tahir (Multan Sultans)

- Islamabad United won the toss and elected to bat.
- Mohammad Huraira (Islamabad United) made his T20 debut.
- As a result of this match, Islamabad United qualified for the playoffs and Quetta Gladiators were eliminated from the tournament.

== Playoffs ==
=== Qualifier ===
Match 31
23 February 2022
19:30 (N)
Scorecard

Multan Sultans; 163/2 (20 overs)	v	Lahore Qalandars; 135/9 (20 overs)
Rilee Rossouw 65* (42); Mohammad Hafeez 1/16 (4 overs)		Fakhar Zaman 63 (45); Shahnawaz Dahani 3/19 (4 overs)

Multan Sultans won by 28 runs
Gaddafi Stadium, Lahore
Umpires: Aleem Dar (Pak) and Richard Illingworth (Eng)
Player of the match: Shahnawaz Dahani (Multan Sultans)

- Lahore Qalandars won the toss and elected to field.

=== Final ===
Match 34
27 February 2022
19:30 (N)
Scorecard

Lahore Qalandars; 180/5 (20 overs)	v	Multan Sultans; 138 (19.3 overs)
Mohammed Hafeez 69 (46); Asif Afridi 3/19 (4 overs)		Khushdil Shah 32 (23); Shaheen Afridi 3/31 (4 overs)

Lahore Qalandars won by 42 runs
Gaddafi Stadium, Lahore
Umpires: Aleem Dar (Pak) and Richard Illingworth (Eng)
Player of the match: Mohammad Hafeez (Lahore Qalandars)

- Lahore Qalandars won the toss and elected to bat.
- Lahore Qalandars won their maiden HBL PSL title.
