= 2022 Karachi Kings season =

Overview of Karachi Kings in 2022

Karachi Kings
2022 season
- Coach: Peter Moores
- Captain: Babar Azam
- Ground(s): National Stadium
- PSL 2022: League stage (6th)
- Most runs: Babar Azam (443)
- Most wickets: Chris Jordan (9)

The Karachi Kings (often abbreviated as KK) is a franchise cricket team which competes in Pakistan Super League (PSL). The team is based in Karachi, the provincial capital of Sindh, Pakistan. The team was coached by Peter Moores, and captained by Babar Azam. The season ended with Karachi Kings losing 9 matches out of 10 and finishing last on the points table. Wasim Akram is the president of Karachi Kings.

== Administration and coaching staff ==
Name	Position
Peter Moores	Head coach
Dougie Brown	Bowling coach
Tariq Wasi	CEO and team manager
Ibrahim Qureshi	Fitness Trainer

== Squad ==
- Players with international caps are listed in **bold**.
- Ages are given as of the first match of the season, 27 January 2022.

No.	Name	Nationality	Birth date	Batting style	Bowling style	Year signed	Notes
Batsmen
28	Ian Cockbain	England	17 February 1987 (aged 34)	Right-handed	Right-arm medium	2022	Replacement for Tom Abell
51	**Sahibzada Farhan**	Pakistan	6 March 1996 (aged 25)	Right-handed	—	2022	
56	**Babar Azam**	Pakistan	15 October 1994 (aged 27)	Right-handed	Right-arm off break	2017	Captain
98	**Sharjeel Khan**	Pakistan	14 August 1989 (aged 32)	Left-handed	Right-arm leg break	2020	
	Tom Abell	England	5 March 1994 (aged 27)	Right-handed	Right-arm medium	2022	
All-rounders
7	**Mohammad Nabi**	Afghanistan	1 January 1985 (aged 37)	Right-handed	Right-arm off break	2021	
9	**Imad Wasim**	Pakistan	18 December 1988 (aged 33)	Left-handed	Slow left arm orthodox	2016	Vice-Captain
11	Faisal Akram	Pakistan	20 August 2003 (aged 18)	Left-handed	Left-arm wrist spin	2022	
12	**Aamer Yamin**	Pakistan	26 June 1990 (aged 31)	Right-handed	Right-arm medium-fast	2019	
15	Tom Lammonby	England	2 June 2000 (aged 21)	Left-handed	Left-arm medium fast	2022	Replacement for Romario Shepherd
44	Jordan Thompson	England	9 October 1996 (aged 25)	Left-handed	Right-arm medium-fast	2022	
49	Qasim Akram	Pakistan	1 December 2002 (aged 19)	Right-handed	Right-arm off break	2021	
90	Mohammad Taha	Pakistan	5 October 2000 (aged 21)	Left-handed	Slow left arm orthodox	2022	Partial replacement for Qasim Akram
Wicket-keepers
6	Rohail Nazir	Pakistan	10 October 2001 (aged 20)	Right-handed		2022	
33	Joe Clarke	England	26 May 1996 (aged 25)	Right-handed		2021	
Bowlers
00	Mohammad Ilyas	Pakistan	21 March 1999 (aged 22)	Right-handed	Right-arm medium-fast	2021	
5	**Mohammad Amir**	Pakistan	13 April 1992 (aged 29)	Left-handed	Left-arm fast-medium	2016	
13	Umaid Asif	Pakistan	30 April 1984 (aged 37)	Right-handed	Right-arm medium-fast	2022	
14	Mohammad Imran	Pakistan	20 January 2001 (aged 21)	Right-handed	Left-arm medium-fast	2022	
19	Talha Ahsan	Pakistan	22 October 2003 (aged 18)	Right-handed	Right-arm leg-break	2022	
34	**Chris Jordan**	England	4 October 1988 (aged 33)	Right-handed	Right-arm fast-medium	2022	
36	**Usman Shinwari**	Pakistan	5 January 1994 (aged 28)	Right-handed	Left-arm fast-medium	2022	Replacement for Mohammad Ilyas
92	**Mir Hamza**	Pakistan	10 September 1992 (aged 29)	Left-handed	Left-arm fast-medium	2022	Partial replacement for Mohammad Imran
	**Romario Shepherd**	West Indies	26 November 1994 (aged 27)	Right-handed	Right-arm fast-medium	2022	
Source: KK squad

== Kit manufacturers and sponsors ==
Kit manufacturer	Shirt sponsor (chest)	Shirt sponsor (back)	Chest branding	Sleeve branding
AJ Sports	PSO Carient Motor Oil	BankIslami	Pepsi	Imtiaz Super Market, Mughal Steel, Bona Papa

Playing kit

== Season standings ==
=== Points table ===
Pos	Team	Pld	W	L	NR	Pts	NRR
1	Multan Sultans (R)	10	9	1	0	18	1.253
2	Lahore Qalandars (C)	10	6	4	0	12	0.765
3	Peshawar Zalmi (4th)	10	6	4	0	12	−0.340
4	Islamabad United (3rd)	10	4	6	0	8	−0.069
5	Quetta Gladiators	10	4	6	0	8	−0.708
6	Karachi Kings	10	1	9	0	2	−0.891

Source: ESPNcricinfo
- The top 4 teams qualified for the playoffs
- advanced to Qualifier
- advanced to Eliminator 1

== League matches ==
Match 1
27 January 2022
19:30 (N)
Scorecard

Karachi Kings; 124/5 (20 overs)	v	Multan Sultans; 126/3 (18.2 overs)
Sharjeel Khan 43 (31); Imran Tahir 3/16 (4 overs)		Mohammad Rizwan 52* (47); Mohammad Nabi 2/17 (3.2 overs)

Multan Sultans won by 7 wickets
National Stadium, Karachi
Umpires: Aleem Dar (Pak) and Richard Illingworth (Eng)
Player of the match: Imran Tahir (Multan Sultans)

- Multan Sultans won the toss and elected to field.
- Ihsanullah (Multan Sultans) made his T20 debut.

Match 4
29 January 2022
19:30 (N)
Scorecard

Karachi Kings; 113 (17.3 overs)	v	Quetta Gladiators; 114/2 (15.5 overs)
Babar Azam 32 (29); Naseem Shah 5/20 (3.3 overs)		Ahsan Ali 57* (43); Mohammad Imran 1/23 (3 overs)

Quetta Gladiators won by 8 wickets
National Stadium, Karachi
Umpires: Michael Gough (Eng) and Shozab Raza (Pak)
Player of the match: Naseem Shah (Quetta Gladiators)

- Quetta Gladiators won the toss and elected to field.

Match 6
30 January 2022
19:30 (N)
Scorecard

Karachi Kings; 170/7 (20 overs)	v	Lahore Qalandars; 174/4 (19.2 overs)
Sharjeel Khan 60 (39); Haris Rauf 3/33 (4 overs)		Fakhar Zaman 106 (60); Umaid Asif 2/30 (4 overs)

Lahore Qalandars won by 6 wickets
National Stadium, Karachi
Umpires: Michael Gough (Eng) and Richard Illingworth (Eng)
Player of the match: Fakhar Zaman (Lahore Qalandars)

- Lahore Qalandars won the toss and elected to field.

Match 11
4 February 2022
19:30 (N)
Scorecard

Peshawar Zalmi; 173/4 (20 overs)	v	Karachi Kings; 164/6 (20 overs)
Shoaib Malik 52* (28); Umaid Asif 3/36 (4 overs)		Babar Azam 90* (63); Mohammad Umar 3/22 (4 overs)

Peshawar Zalmi won by 9 runs
National Stadium, Karachi
Umpires: Aleem Dar (Pak) and Shozab Raza (Pak)
Player of the match: Shoaib Malik (Peshawar Zalmi)

- Karachi Kings won the toss and elected to field

Match 14
6 February 2022
19:30 (N)
Scorecard

Islamabad United; 177/6 (20 overs)	v	Karachi Kings; 135/9 (20 overs)
Paul Stirling 39 (30); Chris Jordan 2/36 (4 overs)		Mohammad Nabi 47* (28); Shadab Khan 4/15 (4 overs)

Islamabad United won by 42 runs
National Stadium, Karachi
Umpires: Richard Illingworth (Eng) and Ahsan Raza (Pak)
Player of the match: Shadab Khan (Islamabad United)

- Islamabad United won the toss and elected to bat.

Match 19
13 February 2022
14:30 (D/N)
Scorecard

Peshawar Zalmi; 193/6 (20 overs)	v	Karachi Kings; 138/6 (20 overs)
Hazratullah Zazai 52 (42); Chris Jordan 3/41 (4 overs)		Babar Azam 59 (46); Salman Irshad 2/24 (4 overs)

Peshawar Zalmi won by 55 runs
Gaddafi Stadium, Lahore
Umpires: Faisal Afridi (Pak) and Rashid Riaz (Pak)
Player of the match: Mohammad Haris (Peshawar Zalmi)

- Karachi Kings won the toss and elected to field.

Match 21
14 February 2022
19:30 (N)
Scorecard

Islamabad United; 191/7 (20 overs)	v	Karachi Kings; 190/8 (20 overs)
Shadab Khan 34 (26); Imad Wasim 2/30 (4 overs)		Imad Wasim 55 (28); Waqas Maqsood 3/34 (4 overs)

Islamabad United won by 1 run
Gaddafi Stadium, Lahore
Umpires: Asif Yaqoob (Pak) and Richard Illingworth (Eng)
Player of the match: Asif Ali (Islamabad United)

- Karachi Kings won the toss and elected to field.
- As a result of this match, Karachi Kings were eliminated from the tournament.

Match 23
16 February 2022
19:30 (N)
Scorecard

Karachi Kings; 174/6 (20 overs)	v	Multan Sultans; 176/3 (19.3 overs)
Joe Clarke 40 (29); Shahnawaz Dahani 2/44 (4 overs)		Mohammad Rizwan 76 (56); Mir Hamza 2/24 (4 overs)

Multan Sultans won by 7 wickets
Gaddafi Stadium, Lahore
Umpires: Richard Illingworth (Eng) and Asif Yaqoob (Pak)
Player of the match: Mohammad Rizwan (Multan Sultans)

- Karachi Kings won the toss and elected to bat.

Match 26
18 February 2022
19:30 (N)
Scorecard

Karachi Kings; 149 (19.5 overs)	v	Lahore Qalandars; 127/9 (20 overs)
Babar Azam 39 (32); Zaman Khan 4/16 (3.5 overs)		Mohammad Hafeez 33 (24); Mir Hamza 4/27 (4 overs)

Karachi Kings won by 22 runs
Gaddafi Stadium, Lahore
Umpires: Asif Yaqoob (Pak) and Michael Gough (Eng)
Player of the match: Mir Hamza (Karachi Kings)

- Karachi Kings won the toss and elected to bat.

Match 28
20 February 2022
14:30 (D/N)
Scorecard

Quetta Gladiators; 166/4 (20 overs)	v	Karachi Kings; 143/8 (20 overs)
Jason Roy 82 (64); Lewis Gregory 1/22 (3 overs)		Joe Clarke 52 (39); Khurram Shahzad 4/22 (4 overs)

Quetta Gladiators won by 23 runs
Gaddafi Stadium, Lahore
Umpires: Aleem Dar (Pak) and Asif Yaqoob (Pak)
Player of the match: Khurram Shahzad (Quetta Gladiators)

- Quetta Gladiators won the toss and elected to bat.
