= 2022 Quetta Gladiators season =

Overview of Quetta Gladiators in 2022

Quetta Gladiators
2022 season
- Coach: Moin Khan
- Captain: Sarfaraz Ahmed
- PSL 2022: League stage (5th)
- Most runs: Jason Roy (303)
- Most wickets: Naseem Shah (14)

The Quetta Gladiators (often abbreviated as QG) is a franchise cricket team which competes in Pakistan Super League (PSL). The team is based in Quetta, the provincial capital of Balochistan, Pakistan. The team was coached by Moin Khan, and captained by Sarfaraz Ahmed.

== Squad ==
- Players with international caps are listed in **bold**.
- Ages are given as of the first match of the season, 27 January 2022

No.	Name	Nationality	Birth date	Batting style	Bowling style	Year signed	Notes
Batsmen
11	Abdul Bangalzai	Pakistan	23 March 2003 (aged 18)	Right-handed	—	2022	
13	**Ahsan Ali**	Pakistan	10 December 1993 (aged 28)	Right-handed	Leg-break	2022	
14	**James Vince**	England	14 March 1991 (aged 30)	Right-handed	Right-arm medium	2022	
20	**Jason Roy**	England	21 July 1999 (aged 22)	Right-handed	Right-arm medium	2022	
23	Will Smeed	England	26 October 2001 (aged 20)	Right-handed	Right-arm off break	2022	Partial replacement for James Vince. Later full replacement for Dan Lawrence
28	**Dan Lawrence**	England	12 July 1997 (aged 24)	Right-handed	Right-arm off break	2022	
96	**Umar Akmal**	Pakistan	26 May 1990 (aged 31)	Right-handed	Right-arm off spin	2022	
99	Ali Imran	Pakistan	25 February 1998 (aged 23)	Right-handed	Right-arm medium	2022	Partial replacement for Noor Ahmad
	**Shimron Hetmyer**	West Indies	26 December 1996 (aged 25)	Left-handed	—	2022	Partial replacement for Jason Roy
	Mohammad Shehzad	Pakistan	5 February 2004 (aged 17)	Right-handed	Right-arm medium-fast	2022	Replacement for James Faulkner
All-rounders
10	**Shahid Afridi**	Pakistan	1 March 1980 (aged 41)	Right-handed	Right-arm leg spin	2022	
16	Hasan Khan	Pakistan	16 October 1998 (aged 23)	Right-handed	Slow left arm orthodox	2022	Partial replacement for Shahid Afridi. Later fully replaced Muhammad Nawaz
21	**Mohammad Nawaz**	Pakistan	21 March 1994 (aged 27)	Left-handed	Slow left arm orthodox	2016	Vice-captain
41	Luke Wood	England	2 August 1995 (aged 26)	Left-handed	Left-arm fast	2022	Full replacement for Naveen-ul-Haq
44	**James Faulkner**	Australia	20 April 1990 (aged 31)	Right-handed	Left-arm fast-medium	2022	
95	**Iftikhar Ahmed**	Pakistan	3 September 1990 (aged 31)	Right-handed	Right-arm off break	2022	
Wicket-keepers
17	**Ben Duckett**	England	17 October 1994 (aged 27)	Left-handed	Right-arm off-break	2022	
54	**Sarfaraz Ahmed**	Pakistan	22 May 1987 (aged 34)	Right-handed	—	2016	Captain
Bowlers
6	Ghulam Mudassar	Pakistan	20 October 1999 (aged 22)	Right-handed	Left-arm fast-medium	2022	
7	Ashir Qureshi	Pakistan	12 August 2001 (aged 20)	Right-handed	Right-arm leg-break googly	2022	
8	Khurram Shahzad	Pakistan	25 November 1999 (aged 22)	Right-handed	Right-arm medium	2022	
15	Noor Ahmad	Afghanistan	3 January 2005 (aged 17)	Left-handed	Left arm unorthodox spin	2022	
33	**Sohail Tanvir**	Pakistan	12 December 1984 (aged 37)	Left-handed	Left-arm medium-fast	2022	
71	**Naseem Shah**	Pakistan	15 February 2003 (aged 18)	Right-handed	Right-arm fast	2019	
76	**Mohammad Irfan**	Pakistan	6 June 1982 (aged 39)	Right-handed	Left-arm fast	2022	Replacement for Muhammad Hasnain
87	**Mohammad Hasnain**	Pakistan	5 April 2000 (aged 21)	Right-handed	Right-arm fast	2019	
	**Naveen-ul-Haq**	Afghanistan	23 September 1999 (aged 22)	Right-handed	Right-arm medium-fast	2022	
Source: QG squad

== Kit manufacturers and sponsors ==
Shirt sponsor (chest)	Shirt sponsor (back)	Chest branding	Sleeve branding
BRB Group	Meiji	BRB Group	Hemani, Soneri Bank, KFC

Playing kit

== Season standings ==
=== Points table ===
Pos	Team	Pld	W	L	NR	Pts	NRR
1	Multan Sultans (R)	10	9	1	0	18	1.253
2	Lahore Qalandars (C)	10	6	4	0	12	0.765
3	Peshawar Zalmi (4th)	10	6	4	0	12	−0.340
4	Islamabad United (3rd)	10	4	6	0	8	−0.069
5	Quetta Gladiators	10	4	6	0	8	−0.708
6	Karachi Kings	10	1	9	0	2	−0.891

Source: ESPNcricinfo
- The top 4 teams qualified for the playoffs
- advanced to Qualifier
- advanced to Eliminator 1

== Regular season ==
Match 2
28 January 2022
19:30 (N)
Scorecard

Quetta Gladiators; 190/4 (20 overs)	v	Peshawar Zalmi; 191/5 (19.4 overs)
Will Smeed 97 (62); Usman Qadir 2/20 (4 overs)		Hussain Talat 52 (29); Mohammad Nawaz 3/44 (4 overs)

Peshawar Zalmi won by 5 wickets
National Stadium, Karachi
Umpires: Michael Gough (Eng) and Ahsan Raza (Pak)
Player of the match: Will Smeed (Quetta Gladiators)

- Peshawar Zalmi won the toss and elected to field.
- Yasir Khan (Peshawar Zalmi) and Ashir Qureshi (Quetta Gladiators) both made their T20 debuts.

Match 4
29 January 2022
19:30 (N)
Scorecard

Karachi Kings; 113 (17.3 overs)	v	Quetta Gladiators; 114/2 (15.5 overs)
Babar Azam 32 (29); Naseem Shah 5/20 (3.3 overs)		Ahsan Ali 57* (43); Mohammad Imran 1/23 (3 overs)

Quetta Gladiators won by 8 wickets
National Stadium, Karachi
Umpires: Michael Gough (Eng) and Shozab Raza (Pak)
Player of the match: Naseem Shah (Quetta Gladiators)

- Quetta Gladiators won the toss and elected to field.

Match 7
31 January 2022
19:30 (N)
Scorecard

Multan Sultans; 174/4 (20 overs)	v	Quetta Gladiators; 168 (19.5 overs)
Shan Masood 88 (58); Mohammad Hasnain 2/27 (4 overs)		Ben Duckett 47 (32); Khushdil Shah 3/16 (4 overs)

Multan Sultans won by 6 runs
National Stadium, Karachi
Umpires: Aleem Dar (Pak) and Ahsan Raza (Pak)
Player of the match: Shan Masood (Multan Sultans)

- Quetta Gladiators won the toss and elected to field.

Match 10
3 February 2022
19:30 (N)
Scorecard

Islamabad United; 229/4 (20 overs)	v	Quetta Gladiators; 186 (19.3 overs)
Colin Munro 72* (39); Mohammad Nawaz 2/32 (4 overs)		Ahsan Ali 50 (27); Shadab Khan 5/28 (4 overs)

Islamabad United won by 43 runs
National Stadium, Karachi
Umpires: Richard Illingworth (Eng) and Imtiaz Iqbal (Pak)
Player of the match: Colin Munro (Islamabad United)

- Quetta Gladiators won the toss and elected to field.

Match 15
7 February 2022
19:30 (N)
Scorecard

Lahore Qalandars; 204/5 (20 overs)	v	Quetta Gladiators; 207/3 (19.3 overs)
Fakhar Zaman 70 (45); Ghulam Mudassar 2/43 (4 overs)		Jason Roy 116 (57); Kamran Ghulam 1/15 (2 overs)

Quetta Gladiators won by 7 wickets
National Stadium, Karachi
Umpires: Michael Gough (Eng) and Shozab Raza (Pak)
Player of the match: Jason Roy (Quetta Gladiators)

- Quetta Gladiators won the toss and elected to field.

Match 18
12 February 2022
19:30 (N)
Scorecard

Islamabad United; 199/8 (20 overs)	v	Quetta Gladiators; 203/5 (19.4 overs)
Alex Hales 62 (38); Shahid Afridi 2/27 (4 overs)		Jason Roy 54 (27); Shadab Khan 3/25 (4 overs)

Quetta Gladiators won by 5 wickets
Gaddafi Stadium, Lahore
Umpires: Faisal Afridi (Pak) and Richard Illingworth (Eng)
Player of the match: Sarfaraz Ahmed (Quetta Gladiators)

- Quetta Gladiators won the toss and elected to field.
- Zeeshan Zameer (Islamabad United) made his T20 debut.

Match 20
13 February 2022
19:30 (N)
Scorecard

Quetta Gladiators; 141/7 (20 overs)	v	Lahore Qalandars; 143/2 (17.4 overs)
Iftikhar Ahmed 52 (39); David Wiese 2/25 (4 overs)		Kamran Ghulam 55* (39); Noor Ahmad 1/24 (4 overs)

Lahore Qalandars won by 8 wickets
Gaddafi Stadium, Lahore
Umpires: Asif Yaqoob (Pak) and Michael Gough (Eng)
Player of the match: Shaheen Afridi (Lahore Qalandars)

- Lahore Qalandars won the toss and elected to field.

Match 22
15 February 2022
19:30 (N)
Scorecard

Peshawar Zalmi; 185/7 (20 overs)	v	Quetta Gladiators; 161/8 (20 overs)
Shoaib Malik 58 (41); Naseem Shah 4/27 (4 overs)		Will Smeed 99 (60); Usman Qadir 3/25 (4 overs)

Peshawar Zalmi won by 24 runs
Gaddafi Stadium, Lahore
Umpires: Michael Gough (Eng) and Rashid Riaz (Pak)
Player of the match: Hussain Talat (Peshawar Zalmi)

- Peshawar Zalmi won the toss and elected to bat.

Match 25
18 February 2022
14:30 (N)
Scorecard

Multan Sultans; 245/3 (20 overs)	v	Quetta Gladiators; 128 (15.5 overs)
Mohammad Rizwan 83* (54); Mohammad Irfan 1/28 (3.3 overs)		Umar Akmal 50 (23); Khushdil Shah 2/17 (2.5 overs)

Multan Sultans won by 117 runs
Gaddafi Stadium, Lahore
Umpires: Aleem Dar (Pak) and Rashid Riaz (Pak)
Player of the match: Rilee Rossouw (Multan Sultans)

- Multan Sultans won the toss and elected to bat.
- As a result of this match, Lahore Qalandars and Peshawar Zalmi both qualified for the play-offs.

Match 28
20 February 2022
14:30 (D/N)
Scorecard

Quetta Gladiators; 166/4 (20 overs)	v	Karachi Kings; 143/8 (20 overs)
Jason Roy 82 (64); Lewis Gregory 1/22 (3 overs)		Joe Clarke 52 (39); Khurram Shahzad 4/22 (4 overs)

Quetta Gladiators won by 23 runs
Gaddafi Stadium, Lahore
Umpires: Aleem Dar (Pak) and Asif Yaqoob (Pak)
Player of the match: Khurram Shahzad (Quetta Gladiators)

- Quetta Gladiators won the toss and elected to bat.
