= 2022 Pakistan Super League =

7th edition of the Pakistan Super League

- Official logo of HBL PSL 7 (Note: Official nomenclature)
- Dates: 27 January – 27 February 2022
- Administrator: Pakistan Cricket Board
- Cricket format: Twenty20
- Tournament format(s): Double round robin and playoffs
- Champions: Lahore Qalandars (1st title)
- Runners-up: Multan Sultans
- Participants: 6
- Matches: 34
- Player of the series: Mohammad Rizwan (MS) (546 runs)
- Most runs: Fakhar Zaman (LQ) (588)
- Most wickets: Shaheen Afridi (LQ) (20)
- Official website: psl-t20.com

The 2022 Pakistan Super League (branded as HBL PSL 7) was the seventh edition of the Pakistan Super League, a professional Twenty20 cricket league established by the Pakistan Cricket Board (PCB). The tournament was held entirely in Pakistan from 27 January to 27 February 2022, with matches played at the National Stadium in Karachi and the Gaddafi Stadium in Lahore. Six teams participated in a double round robin format followed by playoffs, with all matches conducted under strict COVID-19 protocols.

Lahore Qalandars won their maiden PSL title by defeating defending champions Multan Sultans by 42 runs in the final at Lahore. Fakhar Zaman (Lahore Qalandars) was the tournament's leading run-scorer with 588 runs, while Shaheen Afridi (captain of Lahore Qalandars) took the most wickets with 20. Mohammad Rizwan (captain of Multan Sultans) was named Player of the Tournament for his 546 runs.

HBL Pakistan retained the title sponsorship, while broadcast rights were awarded to PTV Sports and A Sports, with Daraz as the livestreaming partner. The tournament saw Karachi Kings finish last with only one win in ten matches, while Shahid Afridi retired mid-season due to injury in what was meant to be his farewell season.

== Squads ==
The players' draft took place on 12 December 2021, while a replacement draft took place on 8 January 2022.

Islamabad United	Karachi Kings	Lahore Qalandars	Multan Sultans	Peshawar Zalmi	Quetta Gladiators
Shadab Khan (c); Asif Ali (vc); Azam Khan; Hasan Ali; Faheem Ashraf; Alex Hales; Mohammad Wasim; Paul Stirling; Colin Munro; Marchant de Lange; Muhammad Akhlaq; ~~Reece Topley~~; Danish Aziz; Zafar Gohar; Mubasir Khan; Zeeshan Zameer; Rahmanullah Gurbaz; Athar Mahmood; Mohammad Huraira; Muhammad Musa; Zahir Khan; Waqas Maqsood; Liam Dawson; Will Jacks; Zahid Mahmood; Nasir Nawaz	Babar Azam (c); Imad Wasim (vc); Mohammad Amir; Joe Clarke; Aamer Yamin; Mohammad Nabi; Sharjeel Khan; Mohammad Ilyas; Chris Jordan; Lewis Gregory; Umaid Asif; ~~Tom Abell~~; Rohail Nazir; Mohammad Imran; Faisal Akram; Qasim Akram; Talha Ahsan; ~~Romario Shepherd~~; Mohammad Taha; Sahibzada Farhan; Jordan Thompson; Ian Cockbain; Tom Lammonby; Usman Shinwari; Mir Hamza	Shaheen Afridi (c); Mohammad Hafeez (vc); Sohail Akhtar; Haris Rauf; Rashid Khan; David Wiese; Ahmed Daniyal; Zeeshan Ashraf; Fakhar Zaman; Abdullah Shafique; Phil Salt; Harry Brook; Kamran Ghulam; Dean Foxcroft; Zaman Khan; Maaz Khan; Samit Patel; Syed Faridoun; Ben Dunk; Mohammad Imran; Akif Javed; Matty Potts; Fawad Ahmed	Mohammad Rizwan (c); Shan Masood (vc); Shahnawaz Dahani; Sohaib Maqsood; Imran Tahir; Khushdil Shah; Rilee Rossouw; Tim David; ~~Odean Smith~~; Rumman Raees; Asif Afridi; Anwar Ali; ~~Rovman Powell~~; Imran Khan; Abbas Afridi; Aamer Azmat; Blessing Muzarabani; Ihsanullah; Johnson Charles; ~~Dominic Drakes~~; David Willey; Rizwan Hussain	Wahab Riaz (c); Shoaib Malik (vc); Tom Kohler-Cadmore; Sherfane Rutherford; Saqib Mahmood; Liam Livingstone; Haider Ali; Hussain Talat; Hazratullah Zazai; Usman Qadir; Salman Irshad; Arshad Iqbal; Sameen Gul; Kamran Akmal; Sirajuddin; Khalid Usman; ~~Mohammad Amir Khan~~; Ben Cutting; Mohammad Haris; Mohammad Umar; Matt Parkinson; Pat Brown; Sohail Khan; Arish Ali Khan; Imam-ul-Haq; Amad Butt; Yasir Khan; Benny Howell; Ali Majid; Tayyab Tahir	Sarfaraz Ahmed (c); Mohammad Nawaz (vc); ~~Shahid Afridi~~; James Vince; Iftikhar Ahmed; ~~Mohammad Hasnain~~; Naseem Shah; Jason Roy; ~~James Faulkner~~; Umar Akmal; Sohail Tanvir; Ben Duckett; Khurram Shahzad; ~~Naveen-ul-Haq~~; Abdul Bangalzai; Ashir Qureshi; Noor Ahmad; Ahsan Ali; Luke Wood; Will Smeed; Shimron Hetmyer; Ali Imran; Ghulam Mudassar; Dan Lawrence; Hasan Khan; Mohammad Irfan; Muhammad Shehzad

Shahid Afridi had stated PSL 2022 would be his farewell season but on 13 February, he withdrew mid-season due to injury. On 19 February, James Faulkner was banned by the PCB due to inappropriate behavior and Faulkner resigned from the league.

== Venues ==
On 24 July 2021, PCB announced that the seventh season of PSL would be held in January and February 2022, with all matches taking place in Pakistan. The National Stadium, Karachi, would host 15 matches, while the Gaddafi Stadium, Lahore, would host 19 matches including the playoffs.

On 30 December 2021, National Command and Operation Center announced that only fully vaccinated people would be allowed to gather at the stadiums, after potentially lifting the restrictions of the COVID-19 pandemic in Pakistan. Ticket sales started from 11 January 2022.

On 19 January 2022, NCOC banned entry for kids under the age of 12, as they were not eligible for vaccination yet, and announced that only a 25 percent crowd be allowed in the Karachi phase. On 7 February, it was announced that a 50 percent crowd would be allowed in the Lahore phase initially, and then the full crowd including children would be allowed from 16 February.

Karachi	Lahore
National Stadium	Gaddafi Stadium
Capacity: 32,000 (8000 allowed)	Capacity: 27,000
Matches: 15	Matches: 19
2022 Pakistan Super League is located in Pakistan

== COVID-19 protocols ==
On 5 January, it was reported that all matches would be played as per the schedule under strict standard operating procedures, though the officials were worried about a surge in the SARS-CoV-2 Omicron variant, as they neither wanted to shift the league to UAE, nor wanted to postpone due to the packed international schedule of the Pakistan cricket team.

Therefore, a pool of about 19 local players was reserved in isolation; these could be used in replacement in case of any emergency, such as if more than eight players out of 22 from any team tested COVID-19 positive. If the whole league was struck, then the winner would have been announced on playing conditions instead.

The PCB regulated three distinct bubbles with different protocols. The main bubble had all the teams, staff, and officials. Each franchise was not allowed to meet within the hotel premises. The two other bubbles were set at a separate hotel, comprising the production crew and ground staff respectively. The bubbles were also not allowed to interact, and every individual was to follow health and safety guidelines. Any violation might result in fines or expulsion from the league.

On 2 February, PCB suspended umpire Faisal Afridi from the next five matches due to breaching the bubble, and he was fined 50% of his fees from the next match.

== Match officials ==
On 17 January, PCB announced the list of officials for league stage matches; this included three Elite Panel of ICC Umpires out of 12, and two Elite Panel of ICC Referees out of five, while the others were from PCB's Elite Panels.

=== Umpires ===
- Faisal Afridi
- Aleem Dar
- Michael Gough
- Nasir Hussain
- Richard Illingworth
- Imtiaz Iqbal
- Imran Javed
- Ahsan Raza
- Shozab Raza
- Rashid Riaz
- Asif Yaqoob
- Waleed Yaqub

=== Referees ===
- Iftikhar Ahmed
- Muhammad Javed
- Ranjan Madugalle
- Roshan Mahanama
- Ali Naqvi

== Marketing ==
The season's logo variant was unveiled on 6 January, with the hashtag #HBLPSL7 also being used on social media.

=== Broadcast rights ===
Since the previous deals concluded in 2021 after a three-year run, HBL renewed the title sponsorship rights for four more years with a 55% increase from the previous deal. PCB signed a new two-year broadcast deal on 10 January 2022 with a consortium of Pakistan Television Corporation (PTV) and ARY Digital Network; (Note: Rs. 4,35,07,86,786 was the fees paid; at that time, US$1 was equivalent to Rs. 176.68. See Indian numbering system and Pakistani rupees.) their bid was 50% more than the previous deal. Daraz signed for the livestreaming rights on 22 January; they won the bid on 26 December with a 175% increase.

In response to the broadcast rights, Aitzaz Ahsan told that Lahore High Court dismissed the petitions filed by Geo TV; one against PCB's bidding process and the other against PTV-ARY joint venture. Ten Sports also broadcast this season after a gap of three years.

=== Anthem and curtain raiser ===
PCB announced a two-year partnership with TikTok on 21 January. The anthem titled "Agay Dekh", sung by Atif Aslam and Aima Baig, was released on 24 January. This season featured a low-scale curtain raiser in Karachi on 27 January.

=== Media personnel§ ===
PCB revealed the names of media personnel on 22 January; they presented in both English and Urdu.

=== Curtain closer ===
The curtain closer took place on 27 February, where the trophy was revealed by Red Bull drift driver Abdo Feghali, and Hadiya Hashmi performed "Qaumi Taranah".

== League stage ==
=== Format ===
Each team played every other team twice in the league stage of the tournament in a double round robin. Following the group stage, the top four teams qualified for the playoff stage of the tournament.

A warm-up match was played between Karachi Kings and Lahore Qalandars on 24 January 2022, in which Lahore Qalandars defeated Karachi Kings by 26 runs.

=== Points table ===
Pos	Team	Pld	W	L	NR	Pts	NRR
1	Multan Sultans (R)	10	9	1	0	18	1.253
2	Lahore Qalandars (C)	10	6	4	0	12	0.765
3	Peshawar Zalmi (4th)	10	6	4	0	12	−0.340
4	Islamabad United (3rd)	10	4	6	0	8	−0.069
5	Quetta Gladiators	10	4	6	0	8	−0.708
6	Karachi Kings	10	1	9	0	2	−0.891

Source: ESPNcricinfo
- The top 4 teams qualified for the playoffs
- advanced to Qualifier
- advanced to Eliminator 1

=== Summary ===
Visitor team →	IU	KK	LQ	MS	PZ	QG
Home team ↓	IU	KK	LQ	MS	PZ	QG
Islamabad United		Islamabad; 1 run	Lahore; 8 runs	Multan; 20 runs	Peshawar; 10 runs	Quetta; 5 wickets
Karachi Kings	Islamabad; 42 runs		Lahore; 6 wickets	Multan; 7 wickets	Peshawar; 9 runs	Quetta; 8 wickets
Lahore Qalandars	Lahore; 66 runs	Karachi; 22 runs		Lahore; 52 runs	Peshawar; Super Over	Lahore; 8 wickets
Multan Sultans	Multan; 6 wickets	Multan; 7 wickets	Multan; 5 wickets		Multan; 42 runs	Multan; 117 runs
Peshawar Zalmi	Islamabad; 9 wickets	Peshawar; 55 runs	Lahore; 29 runs	Multan; 57 runs		Peshawar; 24 runs
Quetta Gladiators	Islamabad; 43 runs	Quetta; 23 runs	Quetta; 7 wickets	Multan; 6 runs	Peshawar; 5 wickets	

Home team won	Visitor team won

- Note: Results listed are according to the home (horizontal) and visitor (vertical) teams.
- Note: Click on a result to see a summary of the match.

=== League progression ===
Team	Group matches										Playoffs		
Team	1	2	3	4	5	6	7	8	9	10	E1/Q	E2	F
Islamabad United	2	2	4	4	6	6	8	8	8	8	W	L	
Karachi Kings	0	0	0	0	0	0	0	0	2	2			
Lahore Qalandars	0	2	4	6	6	8	10	10	12	12	L	W	W
Multan Sultans	2	4	6	8	10	12	12	14	16	18	W		L
Peshawar Zalmi	2	2	2	4	4	4	6	8	10	12	L		
Quetta Gladiators	0	2	2	2	4	6	6	6	6	8			

Win	Loss	No result

- Note: The total points at the end of each group match are listed.
- Note: Click on the points (group matches) or W/L (playoffs) to see the match summary.

== Fixtures ==
The PCB confirmed the fixtures for the tournament on 3 December 2021.

=== Karachi ===
Match 1
27 January 2022
19:30 (N)
Scorecard

(H) Karachi Kings; 124/5 (20 overs)	v	Multan Sultans; 126/3 (18.2 overs)
Sharjeel Khan 43 (31); Imran Tahir 3/16 (4 overs)		Mohammad Rizwan 52* (47); Mohammad Nabi 2/17 (3.2 overs)

Multan Sultans won by 7 wickets
National Stadium, Karachi
Umpires: Aleem Dar (Pak) and Richard Illingworth (Eng)
Player of the match: Imran Tahir (Multan Sultans)

- Multan Sultans won the toss and elected to field.
- Ihsanullah (Multan Sultans) made his T20 debut.

Match 2
28 January 2022
19:30 (N)
Scorecard

Quetta Gladiators; 190/4 (20 overs)	v	Peshawar Zalmi; 191/5 (19.4 overs)
Will Smeed 97 (62); Usman Qadir 2/20 (4 overs)		Hussain Talat 52 (29); Mohammad Nawaz 3/44 (4 overs)

Peshawar Zalmi won by 5 wickets
National Stadium, Karachi
Umpires: Michael Gough (Eng) and Ahsan Raza (Pak)
Player of the match: Will Smeed (Quetta Gladiators)

- Peshawar Zalmi won the toss and elected to field.
- Yasir Khan (Peshawar Zalmi) and Ashir Qureshi (Quetta Gladiators) both made their T20 debuts.

Match 3
29 January 2022
14:30 (D/N)
Scorecard

Lahore Qalandars; 206/5 (20 overs)	v	Multan Sultans; 209/5 (19.4 overs)
Fakhar Zaman 76 (35); Khushdil Shah 1/14 (2 overs)		Shan Masood 83 (50); Shaheen Afridi 3/40 (4 overs)

Multan Sultans won by 5 wickets
National Stadium, Karachi
Umpires: Richard Illingworth (Eng) and Ahsan Raza (Pak)
Player of the match: Shan Masood (Multan Sultan)

- Multan Sultans won the toss and elected to field.

Match 4
29 January 2022
19:30 (N)
Scorecard

(H) Karachi Kings; 113 (17.3 overs)	v	Quetta Gladiators; 115/2 (15.4 overs)
Babar Azam 32 (29); Naseem Shah 5/20 (3.3 overs)		Ahsan Ali 57* (43); Mohammad Imran 1/23 (3 overs)

Quetta Gladiators won by 8 wickets
National Stadium, Karachi
Umpires: Michael Gough (Eng) and Shozab Raza (Pak)
Player of the match: Naseem Shah (Quetta Gladiators)

- Quetta Gladiators won the toss and elected to field.

Match 5
30 January 2022
14:30 (D/N)
Scorecard

Peshawar Zalmi; 168/6 (20 overs)	v	Islamabad United; 172/1 (15.5 overs)
Sherfane Rutherford 70* (46); Faheem Ashraf 2/23 (4 overs)		Alex Hales 82* (54)

Islamabad United won by 9 wickets
National Stadium, Karachi
Umpires: Aleem Dar (Pak) and Ahsan Raza (Pak)
Player of the match: Paul Stirling (Islamabad United)

- Islamabad United won the toss and elected to field.

Match 6
30 January 2022
19:30 (N)
Scorecard

(H) Karachi Kings; 170/7 (20 overs)	v	Lahore Qalandars; 174/4 (19.2 overs)
Sharjeel Khan 60 (39); Haris Rauf 3/33 (4 overs)		Fakhar Zaman 106 (60); Umaid Asif 2/30 (4 overs)

Lahore Qalandars won by 6 wickets
National Stadium, Karachi
Umpires: Michael Gough (Eng) and Richard Illingworth (Eng)
Player of the match: Fakhar Zaman (Lahore Qalandars)

- Lahore Qalandars won the toss and elected to field.

Match 7
31 January 2022
19:30 (N)
Scorecard

Multan Sultans; 174/4 (20 overs)	v	Quetta Gladiators; 168 (19.5 overs)
Shan Masood 88 (58); Mohammad Hasnain 2/27 (4 overs)		Ben Duckett 47 (32); Khushdil Shah 3/16 (4 overs)

Multan Sultans won by 6 runs
National Stadium, Karachi
Umpires: Aleem Dar (Pak) and Ahsan Raza (Pak)
Player of the match: Shan Masood (Multan Sultans)

- Quetta Gladiators won the toss and elected to field.

Match 8
1 February 2022
19:30 (N)
Scorecard

Multan Sultans; 217/5 (20 overs)	v	Islamabad United; 197 (19.4 overs)
Tim David 71 (29); Mohammad Wasim 1/39 (4 overs)		Shadab Khan 91 (42); Khushdil Shah 4/35 (4 overs)

Multan Sultans won by 20 runs
National Stadium, Karachi
Umpires: Michael Gough (Eng) and Shozab Raza (Pak)
Player of the match: Tim David (Multan Sultans)

- Islamabad United won the toss and elected to field.

Match 9
2 February 2022
19:30 (N)
Scorecard

Lahore Qalandars; 199/4 (20 overs)	v	Peshawar Zalmi; 170/9 (20 overs)
Fakhar Zaman 66 (38); Salman Irshad 2/47 (4 overs)		Haider Ali 49 (34); Zaman Khan 3/32 (4 overs)

Lahore Qalandars won by 29 runs
National Stadium, Karachi
Umpires: Shozab Raza (Pak) and Aleem Dar (Pak)
Player of the match: Zaman Khan (Lahore Qalandars)

- Peshawar Zalmi won the toss and elected to field.

Match 10
3 February 2022
19:30 (N)
Scorecard

Islamabad United; 229/4 (20 overs)	v	Quetta Gladiators; 186 (19.3 overs)
Colin Munro 72* (39); Mohammad Nawaz 2/32 (4 overs)		Ahsan Ali 50 (27); Shadab Khan 5/28 (4 overs)

Islamabad United won by 43 runs
National Stadium, Karachi
Umpires: Richard Illingworth (Eng) and Imtiaz Iqbal (Pak)
Player of the match: Colin Munro (Islamabad United)

- Quetta Gladiators won the toss and elected to field.

Match 11
4 February 2022
19:30 (N)
Scorecard

Peshawar Zalmi; 173/4 (20 overs)	v	Karachi Kings (H); 164/6 (20 overs)
Shoaib Malik 52* (28); Umaid Asif 3/36 (4 overs)		Babar Azam 90* (63); Mohammad Umar 3/22 (4 overs)

Peshawar Zalmi won by 9 runs
National Stadium, Karachi
Umpires: Aleem Dar (Pak) and Shozab Raza (Pak)
Player of the match: Shoaib Malik (Peshawar Zalmi)

- Karachi Kings won the toss and elected to field.

Match 12
5 February 2022
14:30 (D/N)
Scorecard

Lahore Qalandars; 174/9 (20 overs)	v	Islamabad United; 166/5 (20 overs)
Abdullah Shafique 44 (24); Shadab Khan 4/20 (4 overs)		Colin Munro 60 (45); Haris Rauf 2/41 (4 overs)

Lahore Qalandars won by 8 runs
National Stadium, Karachi
Umpires: Michael Gough (Eng) and Waleed Yaqub (Pak)
Player of the match: Zaman Khan (Lahore Qalandars)

- Islamabad United won the toss and elected to field.

Match 13
5 February 2022
19:30 (N)
Scorecard

Multan Sultans; 222/3 (20 overs)	v	Peshawar Zalmi; 165/8 (20 overs)
Mohammad Rizwan 82 (53); Shoaib Malik 1/17 (2 overs)		Ben Cutting 52* (31); Imran Tahir 3/25 (4 overs)

Multan Sultans won by 57 runs
National Stadium, Karachi
Umpires: Richard Illingworth (Eng) and Shozab Raza (Pak)
Player of the match: Mohammad Rizwan (Multan Sultans)

- Peshawar Zalmi won the toss and elected to field.

Match 14
6 February 2022
19:30 (N)
Scorecard

Islamabad United; 177/6 (20 overs)	v	Karachi Kings (H); 135/9 (20 overs)
Paul Stirling 39 (30); Chris Jordan 2/36 (4 overs)		Mohammad Nabi 47* (28); Shadab Khan 4/15 (4 overs)

Islamabad United won by 42 runs
National Stadium, Karachi
Umpires: Richard Illingworth (Eng) and Ahsan Raza (Pak)
Player of the match: Shadab Khan (Islamabad United)

- Islamabad United won the toss and elected to bat.

Match 15
7 February 2022
19:30 (N)
Scorecard

Lahore Qalandars; 204/5 (20 overs)	v	Quetta Gladiators; 207/3 (19.3 overs)
Fakhar Zaman 70 (45); Ghulam Mudassar 2/43 (4 overs)		Jason Roy 116 (57); Kamran Ghulam 1/15 (2 overs)

Quetta Gladiators won by 7 wickets
National Stadium, Karachi
Umpires: Michael Gough (Eng) and Shozab Raza (Pak)
Player of the match: Jason Roy (Quetta Gladiators)

- Quetta Gladiators won the toss and elected to field.

=== Lahore ===
Match 16
10 February 2022
19:30 (N)
Scorecard

Multan Sultans; 182/7 (20 overs)	v	Peshawar Zalmi; 140 (19.3 overs)
Shan Masood 68 (49); Wahab Riaz 2/34 (4 overs); Salman Irshad 2/34 (4 overs)		Shoaib Malik 44 (31); Blessing Muzarabani 3/18 (4 overs)

Multan Sultans won by 42 runs
Gaddafi Stadium, Lahore
Umpires: Richard Illingworth (Eng) and Ahsan Raza (Pak)
Player of the match: Shan Masood (Multan Sultans)

- Peshawar Zalmi won the toss and elected to field.
- As a result of this match, Multan Sultans qualified for the play-offs.

Match 17
11 February 2022
19:30 (N)
Scorecard

(H) Lahore Qalandars; 182/4 (20 overs)	v	Multan Sultans; 130 (19.3 overs)
Fakhar Zaman 60 (37); Anwar Ali 1/11 (2 overs)		Sohaib Maqsood 29 (26); Zaman Khan 3/21 (3.3 overs)

Lahore Qalandars won by 52 runs
Gaddafi Stadium, Lahore
Umpires: Aleem Dar (Pak) and Michael Gough (Eng)
Player of the match: Fakhar Zaman (Lahore Qalandars)

- Multan Sultans won the toss and elected to field.

Match 18
12 February 2022
19:30 (N)
Scorecard

Islamabad United; 199/8 (20 overs)	v	Quetta Gladiators; 203/5 (19.4 overs)
Alex Hales 62 (38); Shahid Afridi 2/27 (4 overs)		Jason Roy 54 (27); Shadab Khan 3/25 (4 overs)

Quetta Gladiators won by 5 wickets
Gaddafi Stadium, Lahore
Umpires: Faisal Afridi (Pak) and Richard Illingworth (Eng)
Player of the match: Sarfaraz Ahmed (Quetta Gladiators)

- Quetta Gladiators won the toss and elected to field.
- Zeeshan Zameer (Islamabad United) made his T20 debut.

Match 19
13 February 2022
14:30 (D/N)
Scorecard

Peshawar Zalmi; 193/6 (20 overs)	v	Karachi Kings; 138/6 (20 overs)
Hazratullah Zazai 52 (42); Chris Jordan 3/41 (4 overs)		Babar Azam 59 (46); Salman Irshad 2/24 (4 overs)

Peshawar Zalmi won by 55 runs
Gaddafi Stadium, Lahore
Umpires: Faisal Afridi (Pak) and Rashid Riaz (Pak)
Player of the match: Mohammad Haris (Peshawar Zalmi)

- Karachi Kings won the toss and elected to field.

Match 20
13 February 2022
19:30 (N)
Scorecard

Quetta Gladiators; 141/7 (20 overs)	v	Lahore Qalandars (H); 143/2 (17.4 overs)
Iftikhar Ahmed 52 (39); David Wiese 2/25 (4 overs)		Kamran Ghulam 55* (39); Noor Ahmad 1/24 (4 overs)

Lahore Qalandars won by 8 wickets
Gaddafi Stadium, Lahore
Umpires: Asif Yaqoob (Pak) and Michael Gough (Eng)
Player of the match: Shaheen Afridi (Lahore Qalandars)

- Lahore Qalandars won the toss and elected to field.

Match 21
14 February 2022
19:30 (N)
Scorecard

Islamabad United; 191/7 (20 overs)	v	Karachi Kings; 190/8 (20 overs)
Shadab Khan 34 (26); Imad Wasim 2/30 (4 overs)		Imad Wasim 55 (28); Waqas Maqsood 3/34 (4 overs)

Islamabad United won by 1 run
Gaddafi Stadium, Lahore
Umpires: Asif Yaqoob (Pak) and Richard Illingworth (Eng)
Player of the match: Asif Ali (Islamabad United)

- Karachi Kings won the toss and elected to field.
- As a result of this match, Karachi Kings were eliminated from the tournament.

Match 22
15 February 2022
19:30 (N)
Scorecard

Peshawar Zalmi; 185/7 (20 overs)	v	Quetta Gladiators; 161/8 (20 overs)
Shoaib Malik 58 (41); Naseem Shah 4/27 (4 overs)		Will Smeed 99 (60); Usman Qadir 3/25 (4 overs)

Peshawar Zalmi won by 24 runs
Gaddafi Stadium, Lahore
Umpires: Michael Gough (Eng) and Rashid Riaz (Pak)
Player of the match: Hussain Talat (Peshawar Zalmi)

- Peshawar Zalmi won the toss and elected to bat.

Match 23
16 February 2022
19:30 (N)
Scorecard

Karachi Kings; 174/6 (20 overs)	v	Multan Sultans; 176/3 (19.3 overs)
Joe Clarke 40 (29); Shahnawaz Dahani 2/44 (4 overs)		Mohammad Rizwan 76 (56); Mir Hamza 2/24 (4 overs)

Multan Sultans won by 7 wickets
Gaddafi Stadium, Lahore
Umpires: Richard Illingworth (Eng) and Asif Yaqoob (Pak)
Player of the match: Mohammad Rizwan (Multan Sultans)

- Karachi Kings won the toss and elected to bat.

Match 24
17 February 2022
19:30 (N)
Scorecard

Peshawar Zalmi; 206/8 (20 overs)	v	Islamabad United; 196/7 (20 overs)
Mohammad Haris 70 (32); Faheem Ashraf 3/33 (4 overs)		Azam Khan 85 (46); Salman Irshad 3/29 (4 overs)

Peshawar Zalmi won by 10 runs
Gaddafi Stadium, Lahore
Umpires: Ahsan Raza (Pak) and Richard Illingworth (Eng)
Player of the match: Mohammad Haris (Peshawar Zalmi)

- Peshawar Zalmi won the toss and elected to bat.

Match 25
18 February 2022
14:30 (N)
Scorecard

Multan Sultans; 245/3 (20 overs)	v	Quetta Gladiators; 128 (15.5 overs)
Mohammad Rizwan 83* (54); Mohammad Irfan 1/28 (3.3 overs)		Umar Akmal 50 (23); Khushdil Shah 2/17 (2.5 overs)

Multan Sultans won by 117 runs
Gaddafi Stadium, Lahore
Umpires: Aleem Dar (Pak) and Rashid Riaz (Pak)
Player of the match: Rilee Rossouw (Multan Sultans)

- Multan Sultans won the toss and elected to bat.
- As a result of this match, Lahore Qalandars and Peshawar Zalmi both qualified for the play-offs.

Match 26
18 February 2022
19:30 (N)
Scorecard

Karachi Kings; 149 (19.5 overs)	v	Lahore Qalandars (H); 127/9 (20 overs)
Babar Azam 39 (32); Zaman Khan 4/16 (3.5 overs)		Mohammad Hafeez 33 (24); Mir Hamza 4/27 (4 overs)

Karachi Kings won by 22 runs
Gaddafi Stadium, Lahore
Umpires: Asif Yaqoob (Pak) and Michael Gough (Eng)
Player of the match: Mir Hamza (Karachi Kings)

- Karachi Kings won the toss and elected to bat.

Match 27
19 February 2022
19:30 (N)
Scorecard

(H) Lahore Qalandars; 197/6 (20 overs)	v	Islamabad United; 131/9 (20 overs)
Harry Brook 102* (49); Faheem Ashraf 3/28 (4 overs)		Liam Dawson 31 (26); Rashid Khan 2/19 (4 overs)

Lahore Qalandars won by 66 runs
Gaddafi Stadium, Lahore
Umpires: Rashid Riaz (Pak) and Richard Illingworth (Eng)
Player of the match: Harry Brook (Lahore Qalandars)

- Lahore Qalandars won the toss and elected to bat.

Match 28
20 February 2022
14:30 (D/N)
Scorecard

Quetta Gladiators; 166/4 (20 overs)	v	Karachi Kings; 143/8 (20 overs)
Jason Roy 82 (64); Lewis Gregory 1/22 (3 overs)		Joe Clarke 52 (39); Khurram Shahzad 4/22 (4 overs)

Quetta Gladiators won by 23 runs
Gaddafi Stadium, Lahore
Umpires: Aleem Dar (Pak) and Asif Yaqoob (Pak)
Player of the match: Khurram Shahzad (Quetta Gladiators)

- Quetta Gladiators won the toss and elected to bat.

Match 29
20 February 2022
19:30 (N)
Scorecard

Islamabad United; 105/7 (20 overs)	v	Multan Sultans; 111/4 (17.2 overs)
Muhammad Musa 26* (21); Imran Tahir 2/8 (4 overs)		Mohammad Rizwan 51* (42); Liam Dawson 3/16 (4 overs)

Multan Sultans won by 6 wickets
Gaddafi Stadium, Lahore
Umpires: Michael Gough (Eng) and Rashid Riaz (Pak)
Player of the match: Imran Tahir (Multan Sultans)

- Islamabad United won the toss and elected to bat.
- Mohammad Huraira (Islamabad United) made his T20 debut.
- As a result of this match, Islamabad United qualified for the playoffs and Quetta Gladiators were eliminated from the tournament.

Match 30
21 February 2022
19:30 (N)
Scorecard

Peshawar Zalmi; 158/7 (20 overs)	v	Lahore Qalandars (H); 158/8 (20 overs)
Shoaib Malik 32 (28); Fawad Ahmed 2/26 (4 overs)		Mohammad Hafeez 49 (44); Wahab Riaz 2/19 (4 overs)

Match tied
(Peshawar Zalmi won the Super Over)
Gaddafi Stadium, Lahore
Umpires: Asif Yaqoob (Pak) and Richard Illingworth (Eng)
Player of the match: Wahab Riaz (Peshawar Zalmi)

- Peshawar Zalmi won the toss and elected to bat.

=== Summary ===
==== Week 1 ====
The defending champions Multan Sultans got off to a winning start in game one, beating Karachi by 7 wickets. Peshawar also got off to a winning start in game two, as Hussain Talat's 52 help them beat Quetta by 5 wickets. Khushdil Shah hit four boundaries in the final over of game three as the Sultans beat the Qalandars by 5 wickets. On the same day, Naseem Shah took 5 wickets to help Quetta to an 8 wicket win over Karachi. The next day Islamabad started their tournament with a 9 wicket win over Peshawar. This was largely down to Alex Hales, who scored an unbeaten 82 in the victory. Fakhar Zaman scored the first century of the season in game six, helping the Lahore Qalandars to a 6 wicket win over Karachi. In game seven, Multan were looking to continue their winning start against Quetta. They did this with a half century from Shan Masood propelling them to a 6 run win. Shadab Khan's 91 was in vain in game eight, as Multan beat Islamabad by 20 runs. In game nine, Fakhar Zaman scored 66 to help Lahore to a 29 run win over Peshawar.

==== Week 2 ====
Shadab Khan led from the front in game ten, he took 5 wickets as Islamabad beat Quetta by 43 runs. Shoaib Malik gave Peshawar their second win of the season in game eleven. He scored 52 as Peshawar defeated Quetta by 9 runs. The next day, Zaman Khan bowled an economical last over, conceding four as Lahore beat Islamabad by 8 runs. On the same day, Tim David scored the second fastest half century in PSL history, as Multan beat Peshawar by 57 runs. Match 14 saw another loss for the Karachi Kings, this time by 42 runs to Islamabad United. In the last game of the Karachi leg, Jason Roy scored the highest score of the tournament. He scored 116 as Quetta chased down 204 to beat Lahore by 7 wickets.

==== Week 3 ====
The Lahore leg started with another win for the Multan Sultans, this time by 42 runs over Peshawar, which later meant they qualified for the play-offs. Multan's unbeaten run came to an end the next day, as Lahore led by Fakhar Zaman's 60, inflicted a 52 run loss on them. Sarfaraz Ahmed led from the front in game eighteen, he scored an unbeaten half century to steer Quetta to a 5 wicket win over Islamabad. Hazratullah Zazai scored 52 in game nineteen to help Peshawar to a 55 run win over Karachi. On the same day, Kamran Ghulam scored 55 to help Lahore to an 8 wicket win over Quetta. Karachi Kings were eliminated as a result of game twenty one. Waqas Maqsood took 2 wickets in the final over and ran out Chris Jordan to give Islamabad United a 1 run win. Will Smeed was out on 99 in game twenty two, as Peshawar beat Quetta by 24 runs. The next day, Mohammad Rizwan scored 76 to give Multan a 7 wicket win and hand Karachi their eighth consecutive loss.

==== Week 4 ====
Mohammad Haris scored his first PSL half century in game twenty four, helping Peshawar to a 10 run win over Islamabad. Multan scored the highest total of the tournament in game twenty five, resulting in a 117 run win over Quetta. As a result, both Peshawar and Lahore qualified for the play-offs. The Karachi–Lahore derby brought a change in fortunes for the kings. They beat the Qalandars by 22 runs to get their only win of the season, on their ninth attempt. Harry Brook's century helped Lahore beat Islamabad by 66 runs in game twenty seven. Despite beating Karachi by 23 runs, Quetta were pretty much out of the PSL in game twenty eight. They would now require Islamabad to lose by 156 runs in their final game. Islamabad did lose their final game to Multan. However their 6 wicket loss was enough to send them to the playoffs at Quetta's expense. Shaheen Shah Afridi's cameo of 39 with the bat sent the final game of the league stage to a super over against Peshawar. His opposing captain Wahab Riaz bowled an economical super over though, conceding 5 runs to help Peshawar Zalmi finish the league stage off with a win.

== Playoffs ==
Qualifier and Eliminator 1
23 February – Lahore
1	Multan Sultans	163/2 (20 overs)
2	Lahore Qalandars	135/9 (20 overs)
24 February – Lahore
3	Peshawar Zalmi	169/5 (20 overs)
4	Islamabad United	170/5 (19.3 overs)

Eliminator 2
25 February – Lahore
2	Lahore Qalandars	168/7 (20 overs)
4	Islamabad United	162 (19.4 overs)

Final
27 February – Lahore
2	Lahore Qalandars	180/5 (20 overs)
1	Multan Sultans	138 (19.3 overs)

=== Qualifier ===
Match 31
23 February 2022
19:30 (N)
Scorecard

Multan Sultans; 163/2 (20 overs)	v	Lahore Qalandars (H); 135/9 (20 overs)
Rilee Rossouw 65* (42); Mohammad Hafeez 1/16 (4 overs)		Fakhar Zaman 63 (45); Shahnawaz Dahani 3/19 (4 overs)

Multan Sultans won by 28 runs
Gaddafi Stadium, Lahore
Umpires: Aleem Dar (Pak) and Richard Illingworth (Eng)
Player of the match: Shahnawaz Dahani (Multan Sultans)

- Lahore Qalandars won the toss and elected to field.

The qualifier meant the top two teams on the table, Multan and Lahore, would face off. Lahore won the toss and chose to field. Shan Masood fell cheaply for Multan, however his opening partner Mohammad Rizwan scored an unbeaten 53. Rizwan was supported at the other and by Aamer Azmat, who scored 33, and Rilee Rossouw who finished his innings on 65. Mohammad Hafeez was the pick of the bowlers for Lahore with 1/16 from his four overs. In Lahore's innings the only batsman to really get going was Fakhar Zaman with his 63, as no other batsman got past 30 due to good bowling from Multan, namely Shahnawaz Dahani with 3/19 from his four overs. As a result, the Sultans' won by 28 runs sending them into their second consecutive final and Lahore into Eliminator 2.

=== Eliminators ===
==== Eliminator 1 ====
Match 32
24 February 2022
19:30 (N)
Scorecard

Peshawar Zalmi; 169/5 (20 overs)	v	Islamabad United; 170/5 (19.3 overs)
Kamran Akmal 58 (39); Hasan Ali 3/30 (4 overs)		Alex Hales 62 (49); Salman Irshad 3/31 (4 overs)

Islamabad United won by 5 wickets
Gaddafi Stadium, Lahore
Umpires: Aleem Dar (Pak) and Michael Gough (Eng)
Player of the match: Faheem Ashraf (Islamabad United)

- Peshawar Zalmi won the toss and elected to bat.

The first Eliminator meant the teams at three and four on the table, Peshawar and Islamabad, would play each other. The toss was won by Peshawar who chose to bat. Kamran Akmal scored his first half century of the season for Zalmi, while Mohammad Haris was dismissed for 12. Yasir Khan was next in and was dismissed quickly bringing Shoaib Malik to the crease, Malik continued his good form and scored his third half century of the tournament before getting out. Hasan Ali was the pick of the bowlers for Islamabad with 3/30 from his four overs. In response for United, Alex Hales, scored 62 off 49 to anchor Islamabad's chase. He was supported by the Islamabad middle order who chipped away at Peshawar's score. In the last over, Liam Dawson hit two consecutive boundaries off Benny Howell to seal a 5 wicket win for Islamabad. For Peshawar, the pick of the bowlers was Salman Irshad, who took 3/31 from his 4 overs. The result meant Islamabad were through to the second Eliminator, where they would face Lahore, and Peshawar were out.

==== Eliminator 2 ====
Match 33
25 February 2022
19:30 (N)
Scorecard

(H) Lahore Qalandars; 168/7 (20 overs)	v	Islamabad United; 162 (19.4 overs)
Abdullah Shafique 52 (28); Liam Dawson 2/24 (4 overs)		Azam Khan 40 (28); Haris Rauf 2/31 (4 overs)

Lahore Qalandars won by 6 runs
Gaddafi Stadium, Lahore
Umpires: Michael Gough (Eng) and Richard Illingworth (Eng)
Player of the match: David Wiese (Lahore Qalandars)

- Lahore Qalandars won the toss and elected to bat.

The second eliminator meant the winner of the first Eliminator would face the loser of the Qualifier—Islamabad and Multan respectively. The toss was won by Lahore who chose to bat. Abdullah Shafique stabilised Lahore's innings, after the early wickets of their openers, and he finished on 52. Shafique was supported by contributions from Kamran Ghulam, Mohammad Hafeez and David Wiese which allowed Lahore to finish on 168/7. Liam Dawson had the best bowling figures in the match for Islamabad with his 2/24. In response for United, despite losing wickets often in their chase, Alex Hales's 38 and Azam Khan's 40 got them close to the target. However 2 wickets in the final over meant Islamabad fell short by 6 runs. The pick of the bowlers for Lahore was Haris Rauf, who had figures of 2/31. This result meant that Islamabad were eliminated from the tournament and Lahore were through to the final.

=== Final ===
Match 34
27 February 2022
19:30 (N)
Scorecard

(H) Lahore Qalandars; 180/5 (20 overs)	v	Multan Sultans; 138 (19.3 overs)
Mohammad Hafeez 69 (46); Asif Afridi 3/19 (4 overs)		Khushdil Shah 32 (23); Shaheen Afridi 3/30 (4 overs)

Lahore Qalandars won by 42 runs
Gaddafi Stadium, Lahore
Umpires: Aleem Dar (Pak) and Richard Illingworth (Eng)
Player of the match: Mohammad Hafeez (Lahore Qalandars)

- Lahore Qalandars won the toss and elected to bat.
- Lahore Qalandars won their maiden PSL title.

== Awards and statistics ==
At the end of the season, the player with the most runs will be awarded with a Green cap and the Hanif Mohammad Award. The player with the most wickets will be awarded with Maroon cap and the Fazal Mahmood Award.

=== Most runs ===
Player	Team	Innings	Runs	Batting average	High score
Fakhar Zaman	Lahore Qalandars	13	588	45.23	106
Mohammad Rizwan	Multan Sultans	12	546	68.25	83*
Shan Masood	Multan Sultans	12	478	39.83	88
Shoaib Malik	Peshawar Zalmi	11	401	44.55	58
Alex Hales	Islamabad United	9	355	44.37	82*
Source: ESPNcricinfo; Fakhar Zaman of Lahore Qalandars received the Hanif Mohammad Cap.

=== Most wickets ===
Player	Team	Matches	Wickets	Best innings bowling
Shaheen Afridi	Lahore Qalandars	13	20	3/30
Shadab Khan	Islamabad United	9	19	5/28
Zaman Khan	Lahore Qalandars	13	18	4/16
Shahnawaz Dahani	Multan Sultans	11	17	3/19
Khushdil Shah	Multan Sultans	12	16	4/35
Source: ESPNcricinfo; Shaheen Afridi of Lahore Qalandars received the Fazal Mahmood Cap.
