= 2022 Lahore Qalandars season =

Cricket team in the Pakistan Super League

Lahore Qalandars
2022 season
- Coach: Aaqib Javed
- Captain: Shaheen Afridi
- Ground(s): Gaddafi Stadium
- PSL 2022: 1st (winners)
- Most runs: Fakhar Zaman (588)
- Most wickets: Shaheen Afridi (20)

The Lahore Qalandars (often abbreviated as LQ) is a franchise cricket team that represents Lahore, Punjab in the Pakistan Super League (PSL). The team is coach by Aaqib Javed, and captained by of Shaheen Afridi. In the final, they beat Multan Sultans by 42 runs to win their maiden PSL title.

== Administration and coaching staff ==
Name	Position
Sameen Rana	COO and manager
Atif Rana	CEO
Aaqib Javed	Head coach
Mansoor Rana	Batting coach
Ben Dunk	Power-hitting coach
Waqas Ahmed	Bowling coach
Shehzad Butt	Fielding coach

== Lahore Qalandars ==
No.	Name	Nationality	Birth date	Batting style	Bowling style	Year signed	Notes
Batsmen
15	Sohail Akhtar	Pakistan	2 March 1986 (aged 35)	Right-handed	Right-arm medium	2018	
39	Fakhar Zaman	Pakistan	10 April 1990 (aged 31)	Left-handed	Slow left arm orthodox	2022	
57	Abdullah Shafique	Pakistan	20 November 1999 (aged 22)	Right-handed	Right-arm off-break	2022	
All-rounders
8	Mohammad Hafeez	Pakistan	17 October 1980 (aged 41)	Right-handed	Right-arm off break	2019	Vice-captain
11	Dean Foxcroft	South Africa	20 April 1988 (aged 33)	Right-handed	Right-arm off-break	2022	
27	David Wiese	Namibia	18 May 1985 (aged 36)	Right-handed	Right-arm fast-medium	2019	
29	Samit Patel	England	30 November 1984 (aged 37)	Right-handed	Slow left arm orthodox	2022	
44	Mohammad Imran	Pakistan	25 December 1996 (aged 25)	Right-handed	Right-arm medium	2022	
82	Kamran Ghulam	Pakistan	10 October 1995 (aged 26)	Right-handed	Slow left arm orthodox	2022	
88	Harry Brook	England	22 February 1999 (aged 22)	Right-handed	Right-arm medium	2022	
Wicket-keepers
7	Phil Salt	England	28 August 1996 (aged 25)	Right-handed	Right-arm medium	2022	
51	Ben Dunk	Australia	11 March 1987 (aged 34)	Left-handed	Right-arm off break	2022	Replacement for Phil Salt for the first four matches.
60	Zeeshan Ashraf	Pakistan	11 May 1992 (aged 29)	Left-handed	Right-arm off break	2021	
Bowlers
3	Ahmed Daniyal	Pakistan	21 September 1998 (aged 23)	Right-handed	Right-arm fast	2021	
10	Shaheen Afridi	Pakistan	6 April 2000 (aged 21)	Left-handed	Left-arm fast	2018	Captain
14	Maaz Khan	Pakistan	15 December 1996 (aged 25)	Right-handed	Right-arm leg-break, googly	2022	
17	Syed Faridoun	Pakistan	15 May 2001 (aged 20)	Right-handed	Left-arm wrist spin	2022	
19	Rashid Khan	Afghanistan	20 September 1998 (aged 23)	Right-handed	Right-arm leg break	2021	
35	Matthew Potts	England	29 October 1998 (aged 23)	Right-handed	Right-arm medium fast	2022	Partial replacement for Harry Brook.
52	Fawad Ahmed	Australia	5 February 1982 (aged 39)	Right-handed	Right-arm leg break	2022	Replacement for Rashid Khan after nine matches.
99	Akif Javed	Pakistan	10 October 2000 (aged 21)	Right-handed	Left-arm medium-fast	2022	
150	Haris Rauf	Pakistan	7 November 1993 (aged 28)	Right-handed	Right-arm fast	2019	
155	Zaman Khan	Pakistan	10 September 2001 (aged 20)	Right-handed	Right-arm medium-fast	2022	
Source: LQ squad

== Kit manufacturers and sponsors ==
Shirt sponsor (chest)	Shirt sponsor (back)	Chest branding	Sleeve branding
Marina Sports City	Al Jalil Garden	Mughal Steel	Bank of Punjab, AirSial, Kausar Rana Trust

Home kit

Away kit

== Season standings ==
=== Points table ===
Pos	Team	Pld	W	L	NR	Pts	NRR
1	Multan Sultans (R)	10	9	1	0	18	1.253
2	Lahore Qalandars (C)	10	6	4	0	12	0.765
3	Peshawar Zalmi (4th)	10	6	4	0	12	−0.340
4	Islamabad United (3rd)	10	4	6	0	8	−0.069
5	Quetta Gladiators	10	4	6	0	8	−0.708
6	Karachi Kings	10	1	9	0	2	−0.891

Source: ESPNcricinfo
- The top 4 teams qualified for the playoffs
- advanced to Qualifier
- advanced to Eliminator 1

== League fixtures and results ==
Match 3
29 January 2022
14:30 (D/N)
Scorecard

Lahore Qalandars; 206/5 (20 overs)	v	Multan Sultans; 209/5 (19.4 overs)
Fakhar Zaman 76 (35); Khushdil Shah 1/14 (2 overs)		Shan Masood 83 (50); Shaheen Afridi 3/40 (4 overs)

Multan Sultans won by 5 wickets
National Stadium, Karachi
Umpires: Richard Illingworth (Eng) and Ahsan Raza (Pak)
Player of the match: Shan Masood (Multan Sultan)

- Multan Sultans won the toss and elected to field.

Match 6
30 January 2022
19:30 (N)
Scorecard

Karachi Kings; 170/7 (20 overs)	v	Lahore Qalandars; 174/4 (19.2 overs)
Sharjeel Khan 60 (39); Haris Rauf 3/33 (4 overs)		Fakhar Zaman 106 (60); Umaid Asif 2/30 (4 overs)

Lahore Qalandars won by 6 wickets
National Stadium, Karachi
Umpires: Michael Gough (Eng) and Richard Illingworth (Eng)
Player of the match: Fakhar Zaman (Lahore Qalandars)

- Lahore Qalandars won the toss and elected to field.

Match 9
2 February 2022
19:30 (N)
Scorecard

Lahore Qalandars; 199/4 (20 overs)	v	Peshawar Zalmi; 170/9 (20 overs)
Fakhar Zaman 66 (38); Salman Irshad 2/47 (4 overs)		Haider Ali 49 (34); Zaman Khan 3/32 (4 overs)

Lahore Qalandars won by 29 runs
National Stadium, Karachi
Umpires: Faisal Afridi (Pak) and Aleem Dar (Pak)
Player of the match: Zaman Khan (Lahore Qalandars)

- Peshawar Zalmi won the toss and elected to field.

Match 12
5 February 2022
14:30 (D/N)
Scorecard

Lahore Qalandars; 174/9 (20 overs)	v	Islamabad United; 166/5 (20 overs)
Abdullah Shafique 44 (24); Shadab Khan 4/20 (4 overs)		Colin Munro 60 (45); Haris Rauf 2/41 (4 overs)

Lahore Qalandars won by 8 runs
National Stadium, Karachi
Umpires: Michael Gough (Eng) and Waleed Yaqub (Pak)
Player of the match: Zaman Khan (Lahore Qalandars)

- Islamabad United won the toss and elected to field.

Match 15
7 February 2022
19:30 (N)
Scorecard

Lahore Qalandars; 204/5 (20 overs)	v	Quetta Gladiators; 207/3 (19.3 overs)
Fakhar Zaman 70 (45); Ghulam Mudassar 2/43 (4 overs)		Jason Roy 116 (57); Kamran Ghulam 1/15 (2 overs)

Quetta Gladiators won by 7 wickets
National Stadium, Karachi
Umpires: Michael Gough (Eng) and Shozab Raza (Pak)
Player of the match: Jason Roy (Quetta Gladiators)

- Quetta Gladiators won the toss and elected to field.

Match 17
11 February 2022
19:30 (N)
Scorecard

Lahore Qalandars; 182/4 (20 overs)	v	Multan Sultans; 130 (19.3 overs)
Fakhar Zaman 60 (37); Anwar Ali 1/11 (2 overs)		Sohaib Maqsood 29 (26); Zaman Khan 3/21 (3.3 overs)

Lahore Qalandars won by 52 runs
Gaddafi Stadium, Lahore
Umpires: Aleem Dar (Pak) and Michael Gough (Eng)
Player of the match: Fakhar Zaman (Lahore Qalandars)

- Multan Sultans won the toss and elected to field.

Match 20
13 February 2022
19:30 (N)
Scorecard

Quetta Gladiators; 141/7 (20 overs)	v	Lahore Qalandars; 143/2 (17.4 overs)
Iftikhar Ahmed 52 (39); David Wiese 2/25 (4 overs)		Kamran Ghulam 55* (39); Noor Ahmad 1/24 (4 overs)

Lahore Qalandars won by 8 wickets
Gaddafi Stadium, Lahore
Umpires: Asif Yaqoob (Pak) and Michael Gough (Eng)
Player of the match: Shaheen Afridi (Lahore Qalandars)

- Lahore Qalandars won the toss and elected to field.

Match 26
18 February 2022
19:30 (N)
Scorecard

Karachi Kings; 149 (19.5 overs)	v	Lahore Qalandars; 127/9 (20 overs)
Babar Azam 39 (32); Zaman Khan 4/16 (3.5 overs)		Mohammad Hafeez 33 (24); Mir Hamza 4/27 (4 overs)

Karachi Kings won by 22 runs
Gaddafi Stadium, Lahore
Umpires: Asif Yaqoob (Pak) and Michael Gough (Eng)
Player of the match: Mir Hamza (Karachi Kings)

- Karachi Kings won the toss and elected to bat.

Match 27
19 February 2022
19:30 (N)
Scorecard

Lahore Qalandars; 197/6 (20 overs)	v	Islamabad United; 131/9 (20 overs)
Harry Brook 102* (49); Faheem Ashraf 3/28 (4 overs)		Liam Dawson 31 (26); Rashid Khan 2/19 (4 overs)

Lahore Qalandars won by 66 runs
Gaddafi Stadium, Lahore
Umpires: Rashid Riaz (Pak) and Richard Illingworth (Eng)
Player of the match: Harry Brook (Lahore Qalandars)

- Lahore Qalandars won the toss and elected to bat.

Match 30
21 February 2022
19:30 (N)
Scorecard

Peshawar Zalmi; 158/7 (20 overs)	v	Lahore Qalandars; 158/8 (20 overs)
Shoaib Malik 32 (28); Fawad Ahmed 2/26 (4 overs)		Mohammad Hafeez 49 (44); Wahab Riaz 2/19 (4 overs)

Match tied
(Peshawar Zalmi won the Super Over)
Gaddafi Stadium, Lahore
Umpires: Asif Yaqoob (Pak) and Richard Illingworth (Eng)
Player of the match: Wahab Riaz (Peshawar Zalmi)

- Peshawar Zalmi won the toss and elected to bat.

== Playoffs ==
=== Qualifier ===
Match 31
23 February 2022
19:30 (N)
Scorecard

Multan Sultans; 163/2 (20 overs)	v	Lahore Qalandars; 135/9 (20 overs)
Rilee Rossouw 65* (42); Mohammad Hafeez 1/16 (4 overs)		Fakhar Zaman 63 (45); Shahnawaz Dahani 3/19 (4 overs)

Multan Sultans won by 28 runs
Gaddafi Stadium, Lahore
Umpires: Aleem Dar (Pak) and Richard Illingworth (Eng)
Player of the match: Shahnawaz Dahani (Multan Sultans)

- Lahore Qalandars won the toss and elected to field.

==== Eliminator 2 ====
Match 33
25 February 2022
19:30 (N)
Scorecard

Lahore Qalandars; 168/7 (20 overs)	v	Islamabad United; 162 (19.4 overs)
Abdullah Shafique 52 (28); Liam Dawson 2/24 (4 overs)		Azam Khan 40 (28); Haris Rauf 2/31 (4 overs)

Lahore Qalandars won by 6 runs
Gaddafi Stadium, Lahore
Umpires: Michael Gough (Eng) and Richard Illingworth (Eng)
Player of the match: David Wiese (Lahore Qalandars)

- Lahore Qalandars won the toss and elected to bat.

=== Final ===
Match 34
27 February 2022
19:30 (N)
Scorecard

Lahore Qalandars; 180/5 (20 overs)	v	Multan Sultans; 138 (19.3 overs)
Mohammed Hafeez 69 (46); Asif Afridi 3/19 (4 overs)		Khushdil Shah 32 (23); Shaheen Afridi 3/31 (4 overs)

Lahore Qalandars won by 42 runs
Gaddafi Stadium, Lahore
Umpires: Aleem Dar (Pak) and Richard Illingworth (Eng)
Player of the match: Mohammad Hafeez (Lahore Qalandars)

- Lahore Qalandars won the toss and elected to bat.
