= 2022 Islamabad United season =

Franchise cricket team in Pakistan Super League

Islamabad United
2022 season
- Coach: Azhar Mahmood
- Captain: Shadab Khan
- PSL 2022: Play-offs (3rd)
- Most runs: Alex Hales (355)
- Most wickets: Shadab Khan (19)

Islamabad United is a franchise cricket team that represents Islamabad in the Pakistan Super League (PSL). They were one of the six teams that competed in the 2022 PSL season. The team was coached by Azhar Mahmood, and captained by Shadab Khan.

== Squad ==
- Players with international caps are listed in **bold**.
- Ages are given as of the first day of the season, 27 January 2022.

No.	Name	Nationality	Birth date	Batting style	Bowlling style	Year signed	Notes
Batsmen
1	**Paul Stirling**	Ireland	3 September 1990 (aged 31)	Right-handed	Right-arm off break	2021	
10	**Alex Hales**	England	3 January 1989 (aged 33)	Right-handed	Right-arm medium	2021	
45	**Asif Ali**	Pakistan	1 October 1991 (aged 30)	Right-handed	Right-arm off break	2016	Vice-captain
64	Mohammad Huraira	Pakistan	25 April 2002 (aged 19)	Right-handed	—	2022	Replacement for Zeeshan Zameer
65	Nasir Nawaz	Pakistan	5 September 1998 (aged 23)	Right-handed	Right-arm medium fast	2022	Replacement for Alex Hales
82	**Colin Munro**	New Zealand	11 March 1987 (aged 34)	Left-handed	Right-arm medium fast	2020	
All-rounders
7	**Shadab Khan**	Pakistan	4 October 1998 (aged 23)	Right-handed	Right-arm leg break	2017	Captain
9	Will Jacks	England	21 November 1998 (aged 23)	Right-handed	Right-arm off break	2022	Replacement for Rahmanullah Gurbaz from the ninth match
22	**Danish Aziz**	Pakistan	20 November 1995 (aged 26)	Left-handed	Slow left arm orthodox	2022	
30	Zeeshan Zameer	Pakistan	10 August 2002 (aged 19)	Right-handed	Right-arm fast medium	2022	
41	**Faheem Ashraf**	Pakistan	16 January 1994 (aged 28)	Left-handed	Right-arm fast medium	2018	
53	Mubasir Khan	Pakistan	24 April 2002 (aged 19)	Right-handed	Right-arm off break	2022	
74	**Mohammad Wasim**	Pakistan	25 August 2001 (aged 20)	Right-handed	Right-arm medium fast	2021	
83	**Liam Dawson**	England	1 March 1990 (aged 31)	Right-handed	Slow left arm orthodox	2022	Replacement for Paul Stirling
Wicket-keepers
21	**Rahmanullah Gurbaz**	Afghanistan	28 November 2001 (aged 20)	Right-handed	—	2022	
23	**Azam Khan**	Pakistan	10 August 1998 (aged 23)	Right-handed	—	2022	
61	Muhammad Akhlaq	Pakistan	12 November 1992 (aged 29)	Right-handed	Right-arm medium-fast	2022	
Bowlers
6	Athar Mahmood	Pakistan	25 June 1999 (aged 22)	Right-handed	Right-arm fast medium	2022	
14	**Muhammad Musa**	Pakistan	28 August 2000 (aged 21)	Right-handed	Right-arm medium-fast	2022	
17	**Zafar Gohar**	Pakistan	1 February 1995 (aged 26)	Left-handed	Slow left arm orthodox	2022	
32	**Hasan Ali**	Pakistan	2 July 1994 (aged 27)	Right-handed	Right-arm medium fast	2021	
38	**Reece Topley**	England	21 February 1994 (aged 27)	Right-handed	Left-arm fast-medium	2022	
58	**Waqas Maqsood**	Pakistan	4 November 1987 (aged 34)	Left-handed	Left-arm medium fast	2022	Replacement for Reece Topley
75	**Zahir Khan**	Afghanistan	20 December 1998 (aged 23)	Left-handed	Left arm unorthodox spin	2022	
85	**Zahid Mahmood**	Pakistan	20 March 1988 (aged 33)	Right-handed	Right-arm leg break	2022	Replacement for Shadab Khan
90	**Marchant de Lange**	South Africa	13 October 1990 (aged 31)	Right-handed	Right-arm fast	2022	
Source: IU squad

== Kit manufacturers and sponsors ==
Shirt sponsor (chest)	Shirt sponsor (back)	Chest branding	Sleeve branding
Sabroso	jomo.pk	Fast Cables	DCODE, Tetra Pak, foodpanda

Home kit

Away kit

== Season standings ==
=== Points table ===
Pos	Team	Pld	W	L	NR	Pts	NRR
1	Multan Sultans (R)	10	9	1	0	18	1.253
2	Lahore Qalandars (C)	10	6	4	0	12	0.765
3	Peshawar Zalmi (4th)	10	6	4	0	12	−0.340
4	Islamabad United (3rd)	10	4	6	0	8	−0.069
5	Quetta Gladiators	10	4	6	0	8	−0.708
6	Karachi Kings	10	1	9	0	2	−0.891

Source: ESPNcricinfo
- The top 4 teams qualified for the playoffs
- advanced to Qualifier
- advanced to Eliminator 1

== Fixtures ==
Match 5
30 January 2022
14:30 (D/N)
Scorecard

Peshawar Zalmi; 168/6 (20 overs)	v	Islamabad United; 172/1 (15.5 overs)
Sherfane Rutherford 70* (46); Faheem Ashraf 2/23 (4 overs)		Alex Hales 82* (54)

Islamabad United won by 9 wickets
National Stadium, Karachi
Umpires: Aleem Dar (Pak) and Ahsan Raza (Pak)
Player of the match: Paul Stirling (Islamabad United)

- Islamabad United won the toss and elected to field.

Match 8
1 February 2022
19:30 (N)
Scorecard

Multan Sultans; 217/5 (20 overs)	v	Islamabad United; 197 (19.4 overs)
Tim David 71 (29); Mohammad Wasim 1/39 (4 overs)		Shadab Khan 91 (42); Khushdil Shah 4/35 (4 overs)

Multan Sultans won by 20 runs
National Stadium, Karachi
Umpires: Michael Gough (Eng) and Shozab Raza (Pak)
Player of the match: Tim David (Multan Sultans)

- Islamabad United won the toss and elected to field.

Match 10
3 February 2022
19:30 (N)
Scorecard

Islamabad United; 229/4 (20 overs)	v	Quetta Gladiators; 186 (19.3 overs)
Colin Munro 72* (39); Mohammad Nawaz 2/32 (4 overs)		Ahsan Ali 50 (27); Shadab Khan 5/28 (4 overs)

Islamabad United won by 43 runs
National Stadium, Karachi
Umpires: Richard Illingworth (Eng) and Imtiaz Iqbal (Pak)
Player of the match: Colin Munro (Islamabad United)

- Quetta Gladiators won the toss and elected to field.

Match 12
5 February 2022
14:30 (D/N)
Scorecard

Lahore Qalandars; 174/9 (20 overs)	v	Islamabad United; 166/5 (20 overs)
Abdullah Shafique 44 (24); Shadab Khan 4/20 (4 overs)		Colin Munro 60 (45); Haris Rauf 2/41 (4 overs)

Lahore Qalandars won by 8 runs
National Stadium, Karachi
Umpires: Michael Gough (Eng) and Waleed Yaqub (Pak)
Player of the match: Zaman Khan (Lahore Qalandars)

- Islamabad United won the toss and elected to field.

Match 14
6 February 2022
19:30 (N)
Scorecard

Islamabad United; 177/6 (20 overs)	v	Karachi Kings; 135/9 (20 overs)
Paul Stirling 39 (30); Chris Jordan 2/36 (4 overs)		Mohammad Nabi 47* (28); Shadab Khan 4/15 (4 overs)

Islamabad United won by 42 runs
National Stadium, Karachi
Umpires: Richard Illingworth (Eng) and Ahsan Raza (Pak)
Player of the match: Shadab Khan (Islamabad United)

- Islamabad United won the toss and elected to bat.

Match 18
12 February 2022
19:30 (N)
Scorecard

Islamabad United; 199/8 (20 overs)	v	Quetta Gladiators; 203/5 (19.4 overs)
Alex Hales 62 (38); Shahid Afridi 2/27 (4 overs)		Jason Roy 54 (27); Shadab Khan 3/25 (4 overs)

Quetta Gladiators won by 5 wickets
Gaddafi Stadium, Lahore
Umpires: Faisal Afridi (Pak) and Richard Illingworth (Eng)
Player of the match: Sarfaraz Ahmed (Quetta Gladiators)

- Quetta Gladiators won the toss and elected to field.
- Zeeshan Zameer (Islamabad United) made his T20 debut.

Match 21
14 February 2022
19:30 (N)
Scorecard

Islamabad United; 191/7 (20 overs)	v	Karachi Kings; 190/8 (20 overs)
Shadab Khan 34 (26); Imad Wasim 2/30 (4 overs)		Imad Wasim 55 (28); Waqas Maqsood 3/34 (4 overs)

Islamabad United won by 1 run
Gaddafi Stadium, Lahore
Umpires: Asif Yaqoob (Pak) and Richard Illingworth (Eng)
Player of the match: Asif Ali (Islamabad United)

- Karachi Kings won the toss and elected to field.
- As a result of this match, Karachi Kings were eliminated from the tournament.

Match 24
17 February 2022
19:30 (N)
Scorecard

Peshawar Zalmi; 206/8 (20 overs)	v	Islamabad United; 196/7 (20 overs)
Mohammad Haris 70 (32); Faheem Ashraf 3/33 (4 overs)		Azam Khan 85 (46); Salman Irshad 3/29 (4 overs)

Peshawar Zalmi won by 10 runs
Gaddafi Stadium, Lahore
Umpires: Ahsan Raza (Pak) and Richard Illingworth (Eng)
Player of the match: Mohammad Haris (Peshawar Zalmi)

- Peshawar Zalmi won the toss and elected to bat.

Match 27
19 February 2022
19:30 (N)
Scorecard

Lahore Qalandars; 197/6 (20 overs)	v	Islamabad United; 131/9 (20 overs)
Harry Brook 102* (49); Faheem Ashraf 3/28 (4 overs)		Liam Dawson 31 (26); Rashid Khan 2/19 (4 overs)

Lahore Qalandars won by 66 runs
Gaddafi Stadium, Lahore
Umpires: Rashid Riaz (Pak) and Richard Illingworth (Eng)
Player of the match: Harry Brook (Lahore Qalandars)

- Lahore Qalandars won the toss and elected to bat.

Match 29
20 February 2022
19:30 (N)
Scorecard

Islamabad United; 105/7 (20 overs)	v	Multan Sultans; 111/4 (17.2 overs)
Muhammad Musa 26* (21); Imran Tahir 2/8 (4 overs)		Mohammad Rizwan 51* (42); Liam Dawson 3/16 (4 overs)

Multan Sultans won by 6 wickets
Gaddafi Stadium, Lahore
Umpires: Michael Gough (Eng) and Rashid Riaz (Pak)
Player of the match: Imran Tahir (Multan Sultans)

- Islamabad United won the toss and elected to bat.
- Mohammad Huraira (Islamabad United) made his T20 debut.
- As a result of this match, Islamabad United qualified for the playoffs and Quetta Gladiators were eliminated from the tournament.

== Playoffs ==
=== Eliminator 1 ===
Match 32
24 February 2022
19:30 (N)
Scorecard

Peshawar Zalmi; 169/5 (20 overs)	v	Islamabad United; 170/5 (19.3 overs)
Kamran Akmal 58 (39); Hasan Ali 3/30 (4 overs)		Alex Hales 62 (49); Salman Irshad 3/31 (4 overs)

Islamabad United won by 5 wickets
Gaddafi Stadium, Lahore
Umpires: Aleem Dar (Pak) and Michael Gough (Eng)
Player of the match: Faheem Ashraf (Islamabad United)

- Peshawar Zalmi won the toss and elected to bat.

=== Eliminator 2 ===
Match 33
25 February 2022
19:30 (N)
Scorecard

Lahore Qalandars; 168/7 (20 overs)	v	Islamabad United; 162 (19.4 overs)
Abdullah Shafique 52 (28); Liam Dawson 2/24 (4 overs)		Azam Khan 40 (28); Haris Rauf 2/31 (4 overs)

Lahore Qalandars won by 6 runs
Gaddafi Stadium, Lahore
Umpires: Michael Gough (Eng) and Richard Illingworth (Eng)
Player of the match: David Wiese (Lahore Qalandars)

- Lahore Qalandars won the toss and elected to bat.
