= 2022 Peshawar Zalmi season =

Overview of Peshawar Zalmi in 2022

Peshawar Zalmi
2022 season
- Coach: James Foster
- Captain: Wahab Riaz
- PSL 2022: Playoffs (4th)
- Most runs: Shoaib Malik (401)
- Most wickets: Salman Irshad (15)

The Peshawar Zalmi (often abbreviated as PZ) is a franchise cricket team that represents Peshawar, Khyber Pakhtunkhwa, Pakistan in the Pakistan Super League. The team was coached by James Foster, and captained by Wahab Riaz in the 2022 season.

== Management and coaching staff ==
Name	Position
Inzamam-ul-Haq	President
James Foster	Head coach
Hashim Amla	Batting coach
Mohammad Akram	Team director

== Squad ==
- Players with international caps are listed in **bold**
- Ages are given as of the first match of the season, 27 January 2022

No.	Name	Nat.	Birth date	Bat.	Bowl.	Joined	Notes
Batsmen
3	**Hazratullah Zazai**	Afghanistan	23 March 1998 (aged 23)	Left-handed	Slow left arm orthodox	2021	
17	Yasir Khan	Pakistan	13 April 2002 (aged 19)	Right-handed	—	2022	
46	**Haider Ali**	Pakistan	2 October 2000 (aged 21)	Right-handed	—	2020	
50	**Sherfane Rutherford**	West Indies	15 August 1998 (aged 23)	Left-handed	Right-arm fast-medium	2021	
55	Tayyab Tahir	Pakistan	26 July 1993 (aged 28)	Right-handed	Right-arm leg-break	2022	
All-rounders
7	**Liam Livingstone**	England	4 August 1993 (aged 28)	Right-handed	Right-arm spin	2020	
8	**Hussain Talat**	Pakistan	12 February 1996 (aged 25)	Right-handed	Right-arm medium-fast	2022	
13	Benny Howell	England	5 October 1988 (aged 33)	Right-handed	Right-arm medium-fast	2022	
18	**Shoaib Malik**	Pakistan	1 February 1982 (aged 39)	Right-handed	Right-arm off break	2020	Vice-captain
31	**Ben Cutting**	Australia	30 January 1987 (aged 34)	Right-handed	Right-arm fast-medium	2022	
37	Amad Butt	Pakistan	10 May 1994 (aged 27)	Right-handed	Right-arm fast	2022	
44	Khalid Usman	Pakistan	1 March 1986 (aged 35)	Right-handed	Slow left-arm orthodox	2022	
Wicket-keepers
23	**Kamran Akmal**	Pakistan	13 January 1982 (aged 40)	Right-handed	Right-arm medium	2016	
32	Tom Kohler-Cadmore	England	19 August 1994 (aged 27)	Right-handed	Right-arm off break	2021	
63	Mohammad Haris	Pakistan	13 May 2001 (aged 20)	Right-handed	Right-arm off break	2022	
Bowlers
02	Arish Ali Khan	Pakistan	20 December 2000 (aged 21)	Right-handed	Slow left arm orthodox	2022	Full replacement for Mohammad Amir Khan
05	Ali Majid	Pakistan	29 December 1991 (aged 30)	Right-handed	Right-arm medium	2022	
10	Sameen Gul	Pakistan	4 February 1999 (aged 22)	Right-handed	Right-arm medium-fast	2022	
11	Mohammad Umar	Pakistan	27 December 1999 (aged 22)	Right-handed	Right-arm mediu- fast	2022	
	Mohammad Amir Khan	Pakistan	9 September 2001 (aged 20)	Right-handed	Right-arm medium-fast	2022	
14	**Sohail Khan**	Pakistan	6 March 1984 (aged 37)	Right-handed	Right-arm fast	2022	
25	**Saqib Mahmood**	England	25 February 1997 (aged 24)	Right-handed	Right-arm fast	2021	Ambassador
35	**Arshad Iqbal**	Pakistan	26 December 2000 (aged 21)	Right-handed	Right-arm medium-fast	2022	
36	**Pat Brown**	England	23 August 1998 (aged 23)	Right-handed	Right-arm fast-medium	2022	Partial replacement for Liam Livingstone
47	**Wahab Riaz**	Pakistan	28 June 1985 (aged 36)	Right-handed	Left-arm fast	2016	Captain
70	**Matt Parkinson**	England	24 October 1996 (aged 25)	Right-handed	Right-arm leg-break	2022	Partial replacement for Saqib Mahmood
91	**Usman Qadir**	Pakistan	10 August 1993 (aged 28)	Left-handed	Right-arm leg-break	2022	
99	Salman Irshad	Pakistan	3 December 1995 (aged 26)	Right-handed	Right-arm fast-medium	2022	
	Sirajuddin	Pakistan		Right-handed	Right-arm medium-fast	2022	
Source: PZ squad

== Kit manufacturers and sponsors ==
Kit manufacturer	Shirt sponsor (chest)	Shirt sponsor (back)	Chest branding	Sleeve branding
Zalmi in-house	Haier	TCL	Huawei	McDonald's Pakistan, MG, Malam Jabba ski resort, Turkish Airlines

Playing kit

== Season standings ==
=== Points table ===
Pos	Team	Pld	W	L	NR	Pts	NRR
1	Multan Sultans (R)	10	9	1	0	18	1.253
2	Lahore Qalandars (C)	10	6	4	0	12	0.765
3	Peshawar Zalmi (4th)	10	6	4	0	12	−0.340
4	Islamabad United (3rd)	10	4	6	0	8	−0.069
5	Quetta Gladiators	10	4	6	0	8	−0.708
6	Karachi Kings	10	1	9	0	2	−0.891

Source: ESPNcricinfo
- The top 4 teams qualified for the playoffs
- advanced to Qualifier
- advanced to Eliminator 1

== Fixtures and results ==
Match 2
28 January 2022
19:30 (N)
Scorecard

Quetta Gladiators; 190/4 (20 overs)	v	Peshawar Zalmi; 191/5 (19.4 overs)
Will Smeed 97 (62); Usman Qadir 2/20 (4 overs)		Hussain Talat 52 (29); Mohammad Nawaz 3/44 (4 overs)

Peshawar Zalmi won by 5 wickets
National Stadium, Karachi
Umpires: Michael Gough (Eng) and Ahsan Raza (Pak)
Player of the match: Will Smeed (Quetta Gladiators)

- Peshawar Zalmi won the toss and elected to field.
- Yasir Khan (Peshawar Zalmi) and Ashir Qureshi (Quetta Gladiators) both made their T20 debuts.

Match 5
30 January 2022
14:30 (D/N)
Scorecard

Peshawar Zalmi; 168/6 (20 overs)	v	Islamabad United; 172/1 (15.5 overs)
Sherfane Rutherford 70* (46); Faheem Ashraf 2/23 (4 overs)		Alex Hales 82* (54); Hussain Talat 0/13 (2 overs)

Islamabad United won by 9 wickets
National Stadium, Karachi
Umpires: Aleem Dar (Pak) and Ahsan Raza (Pak)
Player of the match: Paul Stirling (Islamabad United)

- Islamabad United won the toss and elected to field.

Match 9
2 February 2022
19:30 (N)
Scorecard

Lahore Qalandars; 199/4 (20 overs)	v	Peshawar Zalmi; 170/9 (20 overs)
Fakhar Zaman 66 (38); Salman Irshad 2/47 (4 overs)		Haider Ali 49 (34); Zaman Khan 3/32 (4 overs)

Lahore Qalandars won by 29 runs
National Stadium, Karachi
Umpires: Shozab Raza (Pak) and Aleem Dar (Pak)
Player of the match: Zaman Khan (Lahore Qalandars)

- Peshawar Zalmi won the toss and elected to field.

Match 11
4 February 2022
19:30 (N)
Scorecard

Peshawar Zalmi; 173/4 (20 overs)	v	Karachi Kings; 164/6 (20 overs)
Shoaib Malik 52* (28); Umaid Asif 3/36 (4 overs)		Babar Azam 90* (63); Mohammad Umar 3/22 (4 overs)

Peshawar Zalmi won by 9 runs
National Stadium, Karachi
Umpires: Aleem Dar (Pak) and Shozab Raza (Pak)
Player of the match: Shoaib Malik (Peshawar Zalmi)

- Karachi Kings won the toss and elected to field

Match 13
5 February 2022
19:30 (N)
Scorecard

Multan Sultans; 222/3 (20 overs)	v	Peshawar Zalmi; 165/8 (20 overs)
Mohammad Rizwan 82 (53); Shoaib Malik 1/17 (2 overs)		Ben Cutting 52* (31); Imran Tahir 3/25 (4 overs)

Multan Sultans won by 57 runs
National Stadium, Karachi
Umpires: Richard Illingworth (Eng) and Shozab Raza (Pak)
Player of the match: Mohammad Rizwan (Multan Sultans)

- Peshawar Zalmi won the toss and elected to field.

Match 16
10 February 2022
19:30 (N)
Scorecard

Multan Sultans; 182/7 (20 overs)	v	Peshawar Zalmi; 140 (19.3 overs)
Shan Masood 68 (49); Salman Irshad 2/34 (4 overs); Wahab Riaz 2/34 (4 overs)		Shoaib Malik 44 (31); Blessing Muzarabani 3/18 (4 overs)

Multan Sultans won by 42 runs
Gaddafi Stadium, Lahore
Umpires: Richard Illingworth (Eng) and Ahsan Raza (Pak)
Player of the match: Shan Masood (Multan Sultans)

- Peshawar Zalmi won the toss and elected to field.

Match 19
13 February 2022
14:30 (D/N)
Scorecard

Peshawar Zalmi; 193/6 (20 overs)	v	Karachi Kings; 138/6 (20 overs)
Hazratullah Zazai 52 (42); Chris Jordan 3/41 (4 overs)		Babar Azam 59 (46); Salman Irshad 2/24 (4 overs)

Peshawar Zalmi won by 55 runs
Gaddafi Stadium, Lahore
Umpires: Faisal Afridi (Pak) and Rashid Riaz (Pak)
Player of the match: Mohammad Haris (Peshawar Zalmi)

- Karachi Kings won the toss and elected to field.

Match 22
15 February 2022
19:30 (N)
Scorecard

Peshawar Zalmi; 185/7 (20 overs)	v	Quetta Gladiators; 161/8 (20 overs)
Shoaib Malik 58 (41); Naseem Shah 4/27 (4 overs)		Will Smeed 99 (60); Usman Qadir 3/25 (4 overs)

Peshawar Zalmi won by 24 runs
Gaddafi Stadium, Lahore
Umpires: Michael Gough (Eng) and Rashid Riaz (Pak)
Player of the match: Hussain Talat (Peshawar Zalmi)

- Peshawar Zalmi won the toss and elected to bat.

Match 24
17 February 2022
19:30 (N)
Scorecard

Peshawar Zalmi; 206/8 (20 overs)	v	Islamabad United; 196/7 (20 overs)
Mohammad Haris 70 (32); Faheem Ashraf 3/33 (4 overs)		Azam Khan 85 (46); Salman Irshad 3/29 (4 overs)

Peshawar Zalmi won by 10 runs
Gaddafi Stadium, Lahore
Umpires: Ahsan Raza (Pak) and Richard Illingworth (Eng)
Player of the match: Mohammad Haris (Peshawar Zalmi)

- Peshawar Zalmi won the toss and elected to bat.

Match 30
21 February 2022
19:30 (N)
Scorecard

Peshawar Zalmi; 158/7 (20 overs)	v	Lahore Qalandars; 158/8 (20 overs)
Shoaib Malik 32 (28); Fawad Ahmed 2/26 (4 overs)		Mohammad Hafeez 49 (44); Wahab Riaz 2/19 (4 overs)

Match tied
(Peshawar Zalmi won the Super Over)
Gaddafi Stadium, Lahore
Umpires: Asif Yaqoob (Pak) and Richard Illingworth (Eng)
Player of the match: Wahab Riaz (Peshawar Zalmi)

- Peshawar Zalmi won the toss and elected to bat.

== Playoffs ==
=== Eliminator 1 ===
Match 32
24 February 2022
19:30 (N)
Scorecard

Peshawar Zalmi; 169/5 (20 overs)	v	Islamabad United; 170/5 (19.3 overs)
Kamran Akmal 58 (39); Hasan Ali 3/30 (4 overs)		Alex Hales 62 (49); Salman Irshad 3/31 (4 overs)

Islamabad United won by 5 wickets
Gaddafi Stadium, Lahore
Umpires: Aleem Dar (Pak) and Michael Gough (Eng)
Player of the match: Faheem Ashraf (Islamabad United)

- Peshawar Zalmi won the toss and elected to bat.
- As a result of this match, Peshawar Zalmi were eliminated from the 2022 PSL.
