= Ashir Qureshi =

Pakistani cricketer (born 2001)

Personal information
- Full name: Muhammad Ashir Qureshi
- Born: 12 August 2001 (age 25); Karachi, Sindh, Pakistan
- Batting: Right-handed
- Bowling: Leg break googly
- Role: Bowling all-rounder

Domestic team information
- Years: Team
- 2021/22: Sindh
- 2022: Quetta Gladiators
- Source: Cricinfo, 3 February 2022

Muhammad Ashir Qureshi (born 12 August 2001) is a Pakistani cricketer who plays for Sindh. He made his Twenty20 debut on 28 January 2022, for the Quetta Gladiators in the 2022 Pakistan Super League.
