= Khurram Shahzad (Pakistani cricketer, born 1999) =

Pakistani international cricketer

Personal information
- Born: 25 November 1999 (age 26); Malakwal, Mandi Bahauddin District, Punjab, Pakistan
- Height: 6 ft 1 in (185 cm)
- Batting: Right-handed
- Bowling: Right-arm medium-fast
- Role: Bowler

International information
- National side: Pakistan
- Test debut (cap 255): 14 December 2023 v Australia
- Last Test: 27 August 2026 v England

Domestic team information
- Years: Team
- 2022: Quetta Gladiators
- 2023-present: Peshawar Zalmi
- 2025: Worcestershire

Career statistics
Competition	Test	FC	LA	T20
Matches	10	75	53	52
Runs scored	148	943	109	61
Batting average	8.70	10.71	8.38	6.77
100s/50s	0/0	0/2	0/0	0/0
Top score	19	59	20	17*
Balls bowled	1,661	11,827	2,367	1,098
Wickets	38	272	74	58
Bowling average	30.39	26.43	29.51	26.41
5 wickets in innings	1	15	0	0
10 wickets in match	0	2	0	0
Best bowling	6/90	6/23	4/32	4/22
Catches/stumpings	3/–	16/–	9/–	12/–
- Source: ESPNricinfo, 31 August 2026

Khurram Shahzad (born 25 November 1999) is a Pakistani professional cricketer who plays as a right-arm medium-fast bowler for the Pakistan national team. As of June 2026, he is signed with Peshawar Zalmi in the Pakistan Super League.

== Early life ==
Shahzad was born and grew up in Malakwal, a city located in the Mandi Bahauddin District of Punjab, where he learned hard-ball cricket, but due to the lack of facilities he moved to Sargodha to play club cricket before shifting to Lahore, joining the Aligarh Club, before being spotted in 2017, when ahead of the Champions Trophy he was selected by the National Cricket Academy to bowl so the national squad could prepare.

== Domestic career ==
Shahzad made his List A debut for Habib Bank Limited in the 2018–19 Quaid-e-Azam One Day Cup on 16 October 2018.

In September 2019, he was named in Balochistan's squad for the 2019–20 Quaid-e-Azam Trophy tournament.

He made his Twenty20 debut on 6 October 2020, for Balochistan in the 2020–21 National T20 Cup.

In October 2021, he was named in the Pakistan Shaheens squad for their tour of Sri Lanka.

== International career ==
On 20 November 2023, Shahzad was selected in Pakistan's 18-member squad for the Test tour of Australia.

On 14 December 2023, he made his Test debut against Australia.
