= Joe Clarke (cricketer) =

English cricketer (born 1996)

Personal information
- Full name: Joe Michael Clarke
- Born: 26 May 1996 (age 30); Shrewsbury, Shropshire, England
- Height: 5 ft 10 in (1.78 m)
- Batting: Right-handed
- Role: Top-order batter

Domestic team information
- Years: Team
- 2015–2018: Worcestershire (squad no. 33)
- 2017: Marylebone Cricket Club
- 2019–present: Nottinghamshire (squad no. 33)
- 2020: Perth Scorchers
- 2021–2022: Karachi Kings
- 2021: Manchester Originals
- 2021/22–2022/23: Melbourne Stars
- 2022–2024: Welsh Fire
- 2023–2025: Abu Dhabi Knight Riders
- 2023/24: Melbourne Renegades (squad no. 10)
- 2024/25: Victoria
- 2024/25–2025/26: Melbourne Stars
- 2025–present: Birmingham Phoenix
- FC debut: 31 May 2015 Worcestershire v Hampshire
- LA debut: 2 August 2015 Worcestershire v Northamptonshire

Career statistics
Competition	FC	LA	T20
Matches	163	62	272
Runs scored	10,213	1,846	6,647
Batting average	40.85	34.18	26.27
100s/50s	29/48	4/9	4/40
Top score	229*	139	136
Catches/stumpings	115/0	22/2	96/8
- Source: ESPNcricinfo, 26 September 2026

Joe Michael Clarke (born 26 May 1996) is an English cricketer who plays for Nottinghamshire County Cricket Club. He is a right-handed batsman who also plays as a wicket-keeper.

== Career ==
Educated at Llanfyllin High School, Clarke made his first-class debut for Worcestershire against Hampshire in May 2015.

In 2017, Clarke was included in an England Lions squad that toured Australia, scoring 45 against a CA XI in Perth. On 15 September 2018, Clarke was a part of the Worcestershire side that secured their maiden T20 Blast title as they went on to beat Lancashire and Sussex on finals day. Following Worcestershire's relegation to Division Two of the County Championship in 2018, he joined Nottinghamshire on a four-year deal.

Clarke joined Nottinghamshire in September 2018.

In May 2019, the England and Wales Cricket Board (ECB) withdrew Clarke from the Lions' squad, after being named during Alex Hepburn's rape trial. Hepburn was found guilty of rape, and although the judge said that Clarke "did nothing wrong" on the night of the attack, the ECB was concerned about the disrespectful messages about women that had been previously exchanged. On 21 June 2019, the English Cricket Board charged Joe Clarke and Tom Kohler-Cadmore with bringing the game into disrepute in relation to their participation in a WhatsApp group which was evidence in the Alex Hepburn rape case. On 4 July 2019, both players pleaded guilty to the charge and were reprimanded and fined.

In December 2021, he was signed by the Karachi Kings following the players' draft for the 2022 Pakistan Super League. In April 2022, he was bought by the Welsh Fire for the 2022 season of The Hundred.

Clarke was made Nottinghamshire's Twenty20T20 captain for the 2024 season.

Playing for Nottinghamshire in April 2024, Clarke scored 213 not out against Somerset in an unbroken partnership of 392 with Will Young which set a new record for a third-wicket stand for the club, surpassing the previous mark that had stood for 121 years.

Clarke was named Nottinghamshire T20 player of the year for the 2024 season.
