= Mir Hamza =

Pakistani cricketer

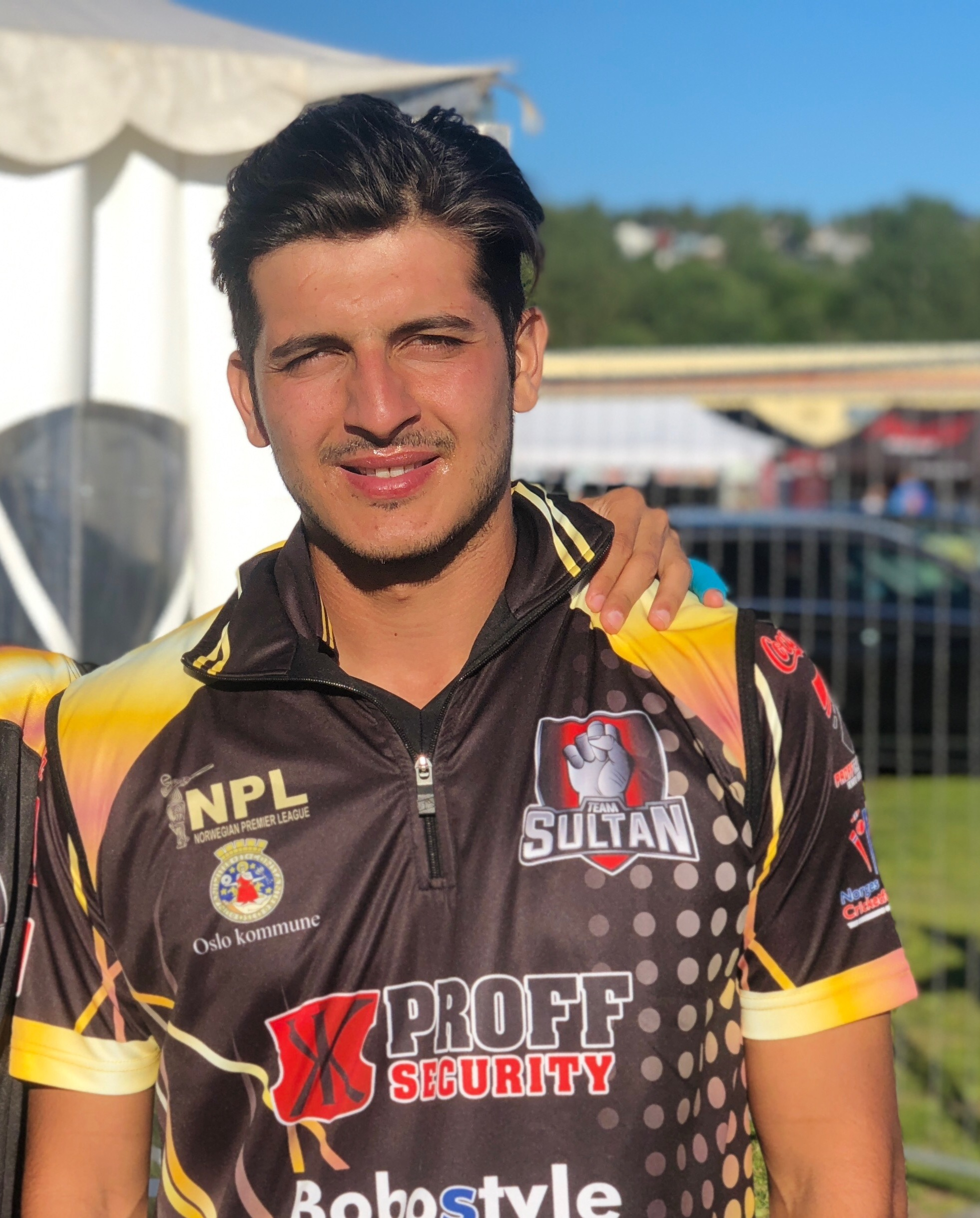

Personal information
- Born: 10 September 1992 (age 34); Karachi, Sindh, Pakistan
- Height: 6 ft 2 in (188 cm)
- Batting: Left-handed
- Bowling: Left-arm medium
- Role: Bowler

International information
- National side: Pakistan (2018–present)
- Test debut (cap 235): 16 October 2018 v Australia
- Last Test: 3 January 2025 v South Africa

Domestic team information
- Years: Team
- 2016; 2022–Present: Karachi Kings (squad no. 92)
- 2017–2018: Quetta Gladiators (squad no. 17)
- 2019: Sussex (squad no. 92)
- 2019/20–2023: Sindh (squad no. 15)
- 2023: Warwickshire
- 2023/24–present: Karachi Whites (squad no. 92)
- 2024,2026: Glamorgan (squad no. 0)

Career statistics
Competition	Test	FC	LA	T20
Matches	7	135	97	79
Runs scored	51	993	339	98
Batting average	6.37	9.73	15.40	19.60
100s/50s	0/0	0/0	0/0	0/0
Top score	16	40	49	19*
Balls bowled	1,183	23,888	4,850	1,686
Wickets	14	528	135	79
Bowling average	45.14	22.05	31.14	29.79
5 wickets in innings	0	33	0	0
10 wickets in match	0	7	0	0
Best bowling	4/32	7/59	4/12	4/9
Catches/stumpings	2/–	33/–	14/–	14/–
- Source: Cricinfo, 26 September 2026

Mir Hamza (born 10 September 1992) is a Pakistani cricketer. He is a left-arm medium fast bowler who made his Test debut for the Pakistan cricket team in October 2018.

== Domestic career ==
In April 2018, Hamza was named in Baluchistan's squad for the 2018 Pakistan Cup.

In January 2019, he signed with Sussex County Cricket Club to play in nine first-class games in the 2019 County Championship in England. In September 2019, he was named in Sindh's squad for the 2019–20 Quaid-e-Azam Trophy tournament. On 1 March 2024, Hamza signed for Glamorgan County Cricket Club.

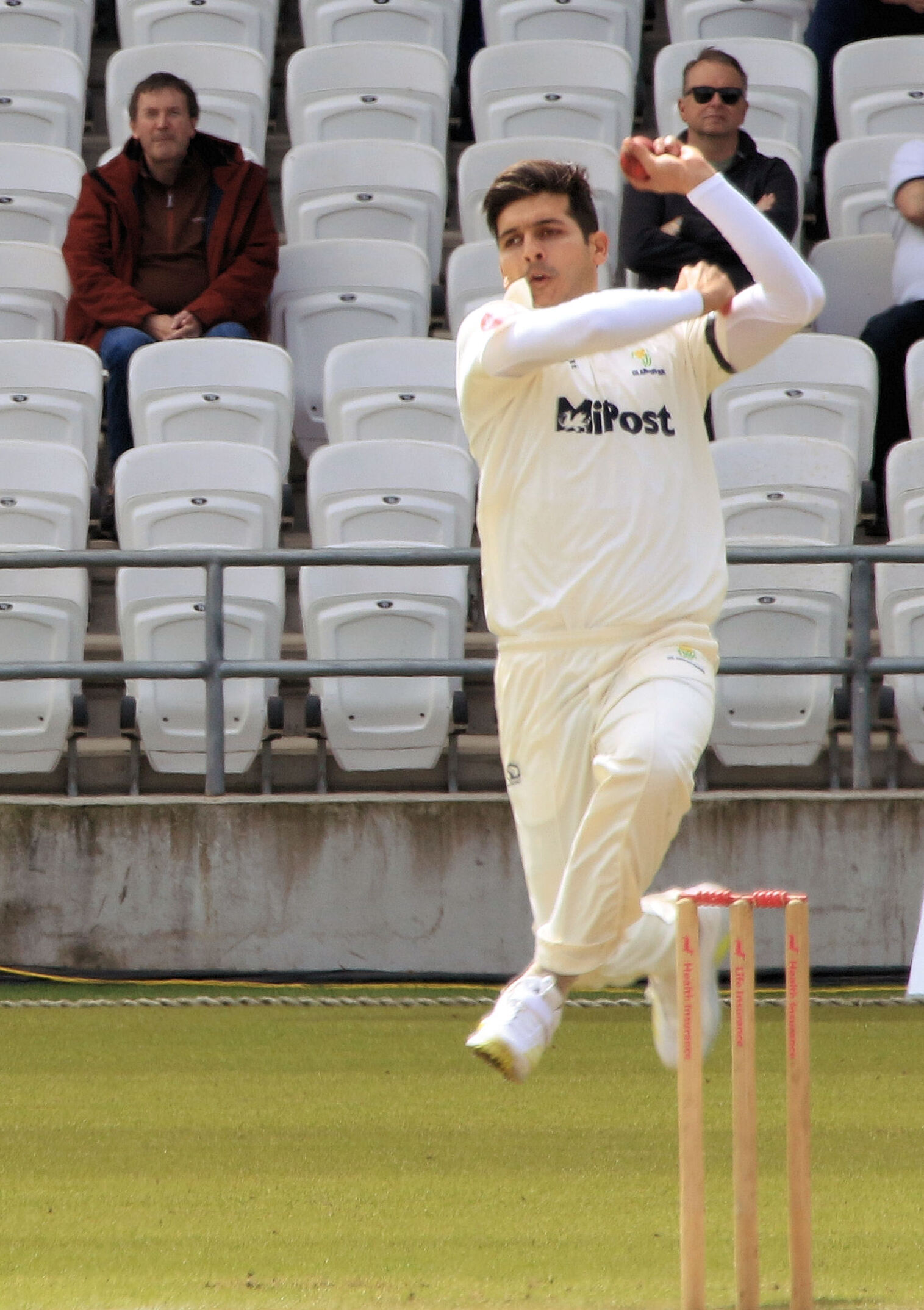
Hamza bowling for Glamorgan in 2024

== International career ==
He played in a tour match between Pakistan and England in the UAE in October 2015. In September 2017, he was named in Pakistan's Test squad for their series against Sri Lanka, but was picked for the playing eleven.

In August 2018, he was one of 33 players to be awarded a central contract for the 2018–19 season by the Pakistan Cricket Board (PCB). The following month, he was named in Pakistan's Test squad for their series against Australia. He made his Test debut for Pakistan against Australia on 16 October 2018.

In December 2022, he was named in Pakistan's Test squad for their series against New Zealand. In November 2023, he was selected in Pakistan's squad for the 3-match Test series in Australia.
