= Zaman Khan =

Pakistani cricketer (born 2001)

Personal information
- Born: 10 September 2001 (age 25); Chakswari, Azad Kashmir, Pakistan
- Nickname: ZamZam
- Height: 5 ft 11 in (180 cm)
- Batting: Right-handed
- Bowling: Right-arm fast
- Role: Bowler

International information
- National side: Pakistan (2023–2024)
- Only ODI (cap 242): 14 September 2023 v Sri Lanka
- ODI shirt no.: 27
- T20I debut (cap 103): 24 March 2023 v Afghanistan
- Last T20I: 25 April 2024 v New Zealand
- T20I shirt no.: 27

Domestic team information
- Years: Team
- 2021–2022: Rawalakot Hawks
- 2021–2023: Northern
- 2022–2025: Lahore Qalandars
- 2022: Jaffna Kings
- 2023: Derbyshire
- 2023: Manchester Originals
- 2023/24: Sydney Thunder
- 2024: Seattle Orcas
- 2025/26: Brisbane Heat

Career statistics
Competition	ODI	T20I	LA	T20
Matches	1	10	13	113
Runs scored	–	8	68	75
Batting average	–	—	13.60	7.50
100s/50s	–/–	0/0	0/0	0/0
Top score	–	8*	42	9*
Balls bowled	36	189	618	2,315
Wickets	0	7	14	134
Bowling average	–	33.71	46.78	24.78
5 wickets in innings	–	0	0	0
10 wickets in match	–	0	0	0
Best bowling	–	1/4	4/90	4/16
Catches/stumpings	0/–	3/–	5/–	23/–
- Source: ESPNcricinfo, 25 January 2026

Zaman Khan (Note: Urdu: زمان خان) (born 10 September 2001) is a Pakistani international cricketer who plays for the Pakistan national team as a fast bowler. Known for his slinging roundarm action, he has often been compared to former Sri Lankan fast bowler Lasith Malinga.

He made his international debut on 24 March 2023 against Afghanistan. Before his international debut, Zaman represented Northern in domestic cricket. He was named in their squad for the 2021–22 National T20 Cup and made his Twenty20 debut on 23 September 2021 during the tournament.

Zaman has also played in several franchise leagues. He was signed by the Lahore Qalandars for the 2022 Pakistan Super League season and played a key role in their title-winning campaign. In December 2022, he joined the Jaffna Kings for the 2022 Lanka Premier League. He later represented Manchester Originals in The Hundred also Sydney Thunder and Brisbane Heat in the Big Bash League.

== Early career ==
Khan was born on 10 September 2001 in Chakswari, Azad Kashmir, Pakistan to a Pahari family. His father was against his wishes to play cricket, enrolling him into a madrasa after school, with Khan continuing to learn the Qur'an by heart today, but, through the encouragement of his uncle, he later joined different cricket clubs in Mirpur and through his performances and bowling speed he was noticed and got a chance to participate in the Kashmir Premier League in 2021, which would be the breakthrough for his career.

After Lahore Qalandars won PSL 7 by defeating Multan Sultans in the final, Lahore Qalandars organized a tour to visit and celebrate in different areas and homes of players. After visiting Zaman Khan's house, the captain of Lahore Qalandars, Shaheen Afridi, requested the COO of Lahore Qalandars to build a house for him, as Zaman Khan lived in a small mud house with a broken roof.

== Domestic career ==
Zaman was first spotted in a Multan Sultans camp back in 2018 before playing for the Pakistan Under-17.

Zaman then played for Rawalakot Hawks in the Kashmir Premier League during 2021, during which he gained public recognition.

Zaman was named in Lahore Qalandar's squad in December 2021 for the seventh edition of the Pakistan Super League. His bowling with a low economy rate helped Lahore win nerve ending matches. His bowling efforts helped Lahore Qalandars to win their first ever title in six years. He was given the 'Emerging Player of the Season' award, and took 18 wickets.

In May 2023, Derbyshire signed him for T20 Blast.

In August 2023, Manchester Originals brought in Zaman to replace Josh Little for The Hundred.

== International career ==
In March 2023, he was named in Pakistan's Twenty20 International (T20I) squad for the series against Afghanistan. On 24 March 2023, he made his T20I debut in the first T20I of the series. In September 2023, he was named as a replacement of Naseem Shah in the Pakistan's Asia Cup squad. On 14 September 2023, he made his One Day International debut against Sri Lanka.
