= Khushdil Shah =

Pakistani cricketer

Personal information
- Full name: Khushdil Shah
- Born: 7 February 1995 (age 31); Bannu, Khyber Pakhtunkhwa, Pakistan
- Height: 5 ft 10 in (178 cm)
- Batting: Left-handed
- Bowling: Slow left-arm orthodox
- Role: All-rounder

International information
- National side: Pakistan (2019–present)
- ODI debut (cap 228): 3 November 2020 v Zimbabwe
- Last ODI: 23 February 2025 v India
- ODI shirt no.: 72
- T20I debut (cap 83): 8 November 2019 v Australia
- Last T20I: 4 August 2025 v West Indies
- T20I shirt no.: 72

Domestic team information
- Years: Team
- 2014–2019: Fata Cheetas
- 2015–2019, 2023–present: FATA
- 2017–2018: Peshawar Zalmi
- 2019–2020: Khyber Pakhtunkhwa
- 2020–2024: Multan Sultans
- 2020–2023: Southern Punjab
- 2023–2024: Comilla Victorians
- 2025–present: Rangpur Riders
- 2025–present: Karachi Kings

Career statistics
Competition	ODI	T20I	LA	T20
Matches	15	38	116	190
Runs scored	328	434	3,418	3,378
Batting average	32.80	17.36	36.75	27.24
100s/50s	0/1	0/0	8/17	1/16
Top score	69	36*	154*	100
Balls bowled	327	78	3,288	1,462
Wickets	4	4	87	81
Bowling average	83.00	21.25	33.86	20.69
5 wickets in innings	0	0	1	0
10 wickets in match	–	–	–	–
Best bowling	1/39	3/13	6/49	4/35
Catches/stumpings	7/–	6/–	44/–	73/1
Medal record
Men's cricket
Representing Pakistan
Asia Cup
Runner-up	2025 UAE
- Source: Cricinfo, 26 March 2025

Khushdil Shah (Urdu, Pashto: خوشدل شاہ; born 7 February 1995) is a Pakistani international cricketer who played for Federally Administered Tribal Areas. He played for Multan Sultans in the Pakistan Super League. He made his international debut for the Pakistan cricket team in November 2019.

== Domestic career ==
In April 2018, he was named in Baluchistan's squad for the 2018 Pakistan Cup. He was the leading run-scorer for Federally Administered Tribal Areas in the 2018–19 Quaid-e-Azam One Day Cup, with 463 runs in seven matches.

In March 2019, he was named in Khyber Pakhtunkhwa's squad for the 2019 Pakistan Cup. On 5 April 2019, he scored 154 not out against Punjab in the tournament.

On 9 October 2020, in the 2020–21 National T20 Cup, he scored the fastest century in a T20 match by a Pakistani batsman, doing so in 35 balls.

== International career ==
In December 2018, he was named in Pakistan's team for the 2018 ACC Emerging Teams Asia Cup.

In October 2019, he was named in Pakistan's Twenty20 International (T20I) squad for their series against Australia. He made his T20I debut for Pakistan, against Australia, on 8 November 2019. Later the same month, he was named in Pakistan's squad for the 2019 ACC Emerging Teams Asia Cup in Bangladesh.

In June 2020, he was named in a 29-man squad for Pakistan's tour to England during the COVID-19 pandemic. In October 2020, he was named in a 22-man squad of "probables" for Pakistan's home series against Zimbabwe. On 29 October 2020, he was named in Pakistan's One Day International (ODI) squad for the first match against Zimbabwe. He made his ODI debut for Pakistan, against Zimbabwe, on 3 November 2020. In November 2020, he was named in Pakistan's 35-man squad for their tour to New Zealand.

In September 2021, he was named in Pakistan's squad for the 2021 ICC Men's T20 World Cup.

In August 2022, Shah was named in Pakistan's squad for 2022 Asia Cup.

In September 2022, he was named in Pakistan's squad for the 2022 ICC Men's T20 World Cup.
