= Salman Irshad =

Pakistani cricketer

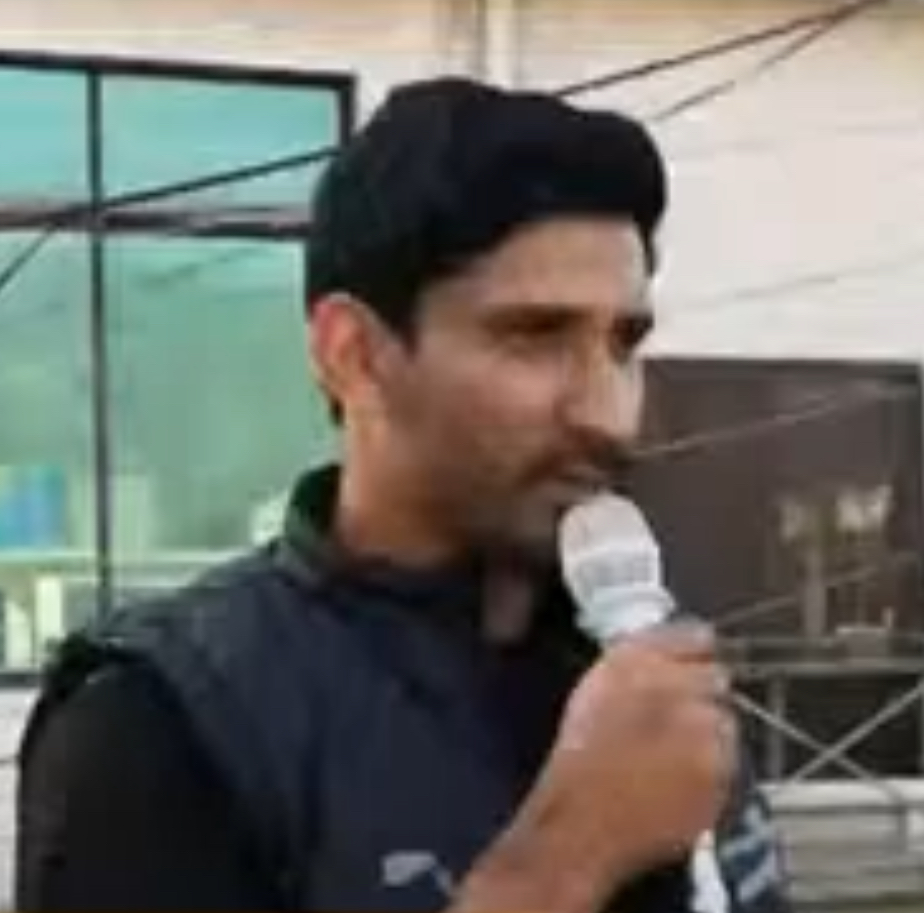
- Irshad in 2022

Personal information
- Born: 3 December 1995 (age 30); Rawalakot, Azad Kashmir, Pakistan
- Height: 6 ft 2 in (188 cm)
- Batting: Right-handed
- Bowling: Right-arm fast-medium
- Role: Bowler

Domestic team information
- Years: Team
- 2015-2016: AJK Jaguars
- 2018; 2020: Lahore Qalandars (squad no. 99)
- 2019–2021: Northern
- 2021-present: Mirpur Royals (squad no. 99)
- 2022-2024: Peshawar Zalmi (squad no. 99)
- 2023: Dhaka Dominators (squad no. 99)
- 2023: Jamaica Tallawahs (squad no. 99)
- 2023-present: Lahore Blues
- 2024: Rangpur Riders
- 2025: Islamabad United
- 2025: Antigua & Barbuda Falcons

Career statistics
Competition	FC	LA	T20
Matches	3	24	74
Runs scored	6	42	53
Batting average	1.20	5.25	4.81
100s/50s	0/0	0/0	0/0
Top score	5	14*	8*
Balls bowled	412	1022	1554
Wickets	6	21	83
Bowling average	50.50	49.38	28.37
5 wickets in innings	0	0	0
10 wickets in match	0	0	0
Best bowling	3/88	2/31	4/27
Catches/stumpings	1/0	9/0	7/0
- Source: ESPNcricinfo, 26 March 2025

Salman Irshad (Urdu: سلمان ارشاد ; born 3 December 1995) is a Pakistani cricketer who plays for Lahore Blues, Mirpur Royals and Peshawar Zalmi.

== Domestic career ==
Salman made his debut for AJK Jaguars against Lahore Region Blues in the National T20 Cup. He got figures of 0/22 in bowling and got out for a golden duck as his side lost by 82 runs.

He made his first-class debut for Northern against Sindh in the 2019–20 Quaid-e-Azam Trophy on 11 October 2019. Northern batted first and Irshad got out for 5 (14) as Northern got all out for 408. In Sindh's first innings Irshad got figures of 1/91 as Sindh were bowled out for 326. In Northern's second innings Irshad didn't get a chance to bat as his team declared and ended their innings on 262/4d. In Sindh's second innings Irshad got figures of 1/50 and Sindh were all out for 199, well below their target of 345. Northern won the match comfortably by 145 runs.

In January 2021, he was named in Northern's squad for the 2020–21 Pakistan Cup. He made his List A debut on 8 January 2021, for Northern, in the 2020–21 Pakistan Cup.

== T20 franchise career ==
=== Pakistan Super League ===
Irshad was spotted during a talent hunt conducted by Lahore Qalandars in Azad Kashmir. He was praised for his ability to consistently bowl deliveries over 140kmph by former Pakistani bowler Shoaib Akhtar with Akhtar saying that he believesd that Irshad could break the 100 mph mark and he offered to train Irshad himself. Irshad also received praise from Aaqib Javed, who said that Irshad had the potential to represent Pakistan at the highest level. He was the first Kashmiri to play in the PSL. In PSL 2018, Irshad played his first match in the PSL for Lahore Qalandars on 2 March 2018 against Islamabad United. Lahore Qalandars were bowling first and Irshad was chosen to bowl the 8th over. He bowled his first delivery, which Misbah-ul-Haq edged and got out. Then in the second innings, Irshad came in as the last batsman. With 7 runs required to win, Irshad hit a six off his first ball which levelled the scores but then got out which led to the PSL's first ever super over. He finished with figures of 1/19 off 2 overs and got a score of 6. Although his side would go on to lose the match in the super over, Irshad gained fame for getting Misbah-ul-Haq out on his first delivery in the PSL. His team then faced Peshawar Zalmi and he got a score of 1 and got figures of 0/23 off 2 overs as Lahore Qalandars got crushed by 10 wickets. His last match of the tournament came against Islamabad United where he got a score of 1 and figures of 0/18 in 1 over as Islamabad won by 6 wickets.

In 2020, Irshad was chosen to replace Haris Rauf in the Lahore Qalandars squad after Rauf got injured during a match against Islamabad United. Irshad played his first match in PSL 2020 for Lahore Qalandars against Peshawar Zalmi, he got figures of 0/33 in 2 overs and got a score of 2* as Lahore Qalandars lost by 16 runs. His next match was against Quetta Gladiators and he got figures of 4/30. He didn't get a chance to bat as Lahore Qalandars won by 37 runs. This was the first win for Irshad in the PSL with Lahore Qalandars. The next match came against Islamabad United, Irshad didn't get a chance to bat and he got figures of 1/43 off 4 overs as his side lost by 71 runs. His next match was against Quetta Gladiators where he got figures of 1/9 and he didn't bat as Lahore Qalandars crushed Quetta by 8 wickets. The next match he played in was against Karachi Kings and he got figures of 1/28 and didn't bat as Lahore Qalandars won by 8 wickets.

Irshad was picked by Peshawar Zalmi in the silver category during the 2022 PSL draft. He made his debut for Peshawar Zalmi against Lahore Qalandars, his former team. He got figures of 2/47 and got a score of 1*. He also prevented David Wiese's hat-trick after Irshad was originally given out but he reviewed the decision and got the decision overturned. Peshawar went on to lose the match by 29 runs. In his next match, against Karachi Kings, he did not bat and got figures of 0/24 as Peshawar beat Karachi by 9 runs. In the next match against Multan Sultans, he got figures of 1/38 and did not bat as Peshawar got crushed by 57 runs. His next match was against Multan Sultans again in which he got a score of 2(4) and got figures of 2/34 as Peshawar lost by 42 runs. Peshawar played Karachi Kings next and Irshad got figures of 2/25 as Peshawar won comfortably by 55 runs. His next match was against Quetta Gladiators as Irshad got figures of 2/37 which included the wicket of Will Smeed on 99 which denied Smeed his century. Peshawar went on to defeat Quetta by 24 runs. Irshad's last match of the group stage came against Islamabad United as he went on to pick up figures of 3/29 and Peshawar won by 10 runs. He was left out of the squad for the final game of the group stages as Peshawar narrowly beat Lahore Qalandars in a super over. His next match was against Islamabad United in the 1st eliminator and he got figures of 3/31 as Peshawar lost by 5 wickets and were therefore knocked out of the 2022 PSL. He ended the tournament as Peshawar Zalmi's highest wicket taker with 15 wickets, just 5 short of Shaheen Afridi’s 20 (the highest of the tournament). He was named as one of the ‘breakout stars’ of the 2022 PSL by Cricinfo.

Irshad was retained by Peshawar Zalmi in the silver category prior to the 2023 PSL draft.

=== Bangladesh Premier League ===
Irshad was selected by Dhaka Dominators during the 2023 Bangladesh Premier League draft.

=== Caribbean Premier League ===
In August 2023, Irshad was signed by Jamaica Tallawahs for the 2023 Caribbean Premier League. On 23 August, Irshad registered his career best figures of 4/27 against St Kitts and Nevis Patriots.

=== Other leagues ===
Irshad was chosen in the Lahore Qalandars squad competing in the 2018 Abu Dhabi T20 Trophy but he didn't play in any match as Lahore Qalandars went on to win the tournament.

Irshad was picked by Mirpur Royals for the first edition of the KPL in the gold category. He made his debut against Rawalakot Hawks on the 6th of August 2021. His team lost in eliminator 2 to eventual champions Rawalakot Hawks but he ended the tournament as the highest wicket taker with 16 wickets. He also won the award for The Best Kashmiri Player. Irshad played for the Pokhara Avengers in the 2022 Nepal T20 League. He played for Samp Army in the 2023 Abu Dhabi T10.
