= Shozab Raza =

Cricket umpire

Shozab Raza شوزيب رضا
Personal information
- Full name: Shozab Raza
- Born: 31 October 1964 (age 62); Lahore, Pakistan

Umpiring information
- ODIs umpired: 24 (2012–2019)
- T20Is umpired: 37 (2012–2021)
- WODIs umpired: 2 (2019)
- WT20Is umpired: 5 (2018)
- Source: ESPNcricinfo, 13 February 2021

Shozab Raza (Urdu: شوزيب رضا) is a cricket umpire from Pakistan.

== Career ==
Raza made his debut as an international umpire in 2012 when he officiated in a One Day International (ODI) match between Pakistan and Afghanistan at Sharjah Cricket Association Stadium. He officiated in his first Twenty20 International (T20I) in 2012 when Pakistan and England played at Dubai International Cricket Stadium. He got a contract as an umpire from Pakistan Cricket Board (PCB) along with Zameer Haider and Ahsan Raza in 2012. He stood in the final of the 2016 Asia Cup.

He was one of the seventeen on-field umpires for the 2018 Under-19 Cricket World Cup. In December 2020, he was among the shortlisted candidates for the 2020 PCB Awards for the Umpire of the Year.

== See also ==
- List of One Day International cricket umpires
- List of Twenty20 International cricket umpires
