= Mirpur Royals in 2022 =

2nd season of Mirpur Royals in the Kashmir Premier League

Mirpur Royals
2022 season
- Coach: Abdul Razzaq
- Captain: Shoaib Malik
- KPL 2022: 1st (winners)
- Most runs: Hassan Nawaz (241)
- Most wickets: Abrar Ahmed (7); Shadab Majeed (7)

Mirpur Royals is a franchise cricket team that represents Mirpur in the Kashmir Premier League. Shoaib Malik is the captain and Abdul Razzaq is the coach of the team. Shoaib Malik was announced as Mirpur Royals’ icon player.

== Squad ==
- Players with international caps are listed in **bold**.
- Ages are correct as of 21 July 2022

| No. | Name | Nationality | Birth date | Category | Batting style | Bowling style | Year signed | Notes |
Batsmen
| 77 | Hassan Nawaz | Pakistan | 23 January 1992 (aged 30) | Emerging | Right-handed | Right-arm fast-medium | 2022 | |
| | Arsalan Mehzood | Pakistan | 6 June 1998 (aged 24) | | Right-handed | | 2022 | Post-draft signing |
| | Hamza Arshad | Pakistan | 15 March 1995 (aged 27) | Silver | Left-handed | Slow left-arm orthodox | 2022 | |
| | Shan Khan | Pakistan | 1 June 2003 (aged 19) | Kashmiri | Right-handed | Right-arm medium-fast | 2022 | |
| | Zaid Alam | Pakistan | 24 December 1999 (aged 22) | Silver | Right-handed | Right-arm fast-medium | 2022 | |
All-rounders
| 9 | **Imad Wasim** | Pakistan | 18 December 1988 (aged 33) | Platinum | Left-handed | Slow left-arm orthodox | 2022 | |
| 18 | **Shoaib Malik** | Pakistan | 1 February 1982 (aged 40) | Icon | Right-handed | Right-arm off spin | 2021 | Captain |
| 89 | **Haris Sohail** | Pakistan | 9 January 1989 (aged 33) | Platinum | Left-handed | Slow left-arm orthodox | 2022 | |
| | Ali Imran | Pakistan | 25 February 1998 (aged 24) | Diamond | Right-handed | Slow left-arm orthodox | 2022 | |
| | Ali Razzaq | Pakistan | | Emerging | Right-handed | Right-arm medium-fast | 2022 | |
| | Umar Hayat | Pakistan | 20 January 2001 (aged 21) | Kashmiri | Right-handed | Off spin | 2022 | |
Wicket-keepers
| 27 | Raza-ul-Mustafa | Pakistan | 27 December 2003 (aged 18) | Supplementary | Right-handed | | 2022 | |
| 61 | Muhammad Akhlaq | Pakistan | 12 November 1992 (aged 29) | Gold | Right-handed | Right-arm medium-fast | 2021 | |
Bowlers
| 7 | Abrar Ahmed | Pakistan | 16 October 1998 (aged 23) | Gold | Left-handed | Left-arm leg break | 2021 | |
| 38 | Shadab Majeed | Pakistan | 7 June 1997 (aged 25) | Kashmiri | Right-handed | Right-arm medium fast | 2021 | |
| 41 | Kashif Ali | Pakistan | 4 October 2002 (aged 19) | Silver | Right-handed | Right-arm medium | 2022 | |
| 66 | Izhar-ul-Haq | Pakistan | 6 April 2007 (aged 15) | Kashmiri | Right-handed | Right-arm medium-fast | 2022 | Post-draft signing |
| 82 | Sufiyan Muqeem | Pakistan | | Kashmiri | | | 2022 | |
| 86 | **Yasir Shah** | Pakistan | 2 May 1986 (aged 36) | Supplementary | Right-handed | Leg spin | 2022 | |
| 99 | Salman Irshad | Pakistan | 3 December 1995 (aged 26) | Diamond | Right-handed | Right-arm fast | 2021 | |
| | Faizan Saleem | Pakistan | | Kashmiri | Right-handed | Right-arm medium | 2022 | |
| | Zubair Lodhi | Pakistan | 20 June 1996 (aged 26) | Silver | Right-handed | Right-arm medium-fast | 2022 | |

== Season standings ==
=== Points table ===
| Pos | Team | Pld | W | L | NR | Pts | NRR |
|---|---|---|---|---|---|---|---|
| 1 | Mirpur Royals (C) | 6 | 4 | 2 | 0 | 8 | 0.409 |
| 2 | Bagh Stallions (R) | 6 | 3 | 2 | 1 | 7 | 0.449 |
| 3 | Overseas Warriors (3rd) | 6 | 3 | 2 | 1 | 7 | 0.207 |
| 4 | Kotli Lions (4th) | 6 | 2 | 3 | 1 | 5 | 0.457 |
| 5 | Jammu Janbaz | 6 | 2 | 3 | 1 | 5 | −0.322 |
| 6 | Rawalakot Hawks | 6 | 2 | 3 | 1 | 5 | −0.613 |
| 7 | Muzaffarabad Tigers | 6 | 2 | 3 | 1 | 5 | −0.699 |

Source: Cricinfo
- Top 4 teams qualified for the playoffs
- Advanced to Qualifier
- Advanced to Eliminator 1

Notes:

- C = Champions;
- R = Runner-up;
- (x) = Position at the end of the tournament;

== League fixtures and results ==
Match 2
14 August 2022
14:00
Scorecard

| Kotli Lions; 151/6 (20 overs) | v | Mirpur Royals; 152/4 (19.4 overs) |
| Danish Aziz 52* (43); Zubair Lodhi 2/43 (4 overs) | | Ali Imran 84 (57); Khurram Shahzad 3/27 (4 overs) |

Mirpur Royals won by 6 wickets
Muzaffarabad Cricket Stadium, Muzaffarabad
Umpires: Imran Javed (Pak) and Shozab Raza (Pak)
Player of the match: Ali Imran (Mirpur Royals)

- Mirpur Royals won the toss and elected to bowl.

Match 5
15 August 2022
19:00 (N)
Scorecard

| Bagh Stallions; 189/5 (20 overs) | v | Mirpur Royals; 181/4 (20 overs) |
| Sohaib Maqsood 72* (53); Abrar Ahmed 2/24 (4 overs) | | Ali Imran 47 (28); Aamer Jamal 2/39 (4 overs) |

Bagh Stallions won by 8 runs
Muzaffarabad Cricket Stadium, Muzaffarabad
Umpires: Ghaffar Kazmi (Pak) and Imran Javed (Pak)
Player of the match: Sohaib Maqsood (Bagh Stallions)

- Mirpur Royals won the toss and elected to field.

Match 10
18 August 2022
14:00
Scorecard

| Overseas Warriors; 188/7 (20 overs) | v | Mirpur Royals; 173/8 (20 overs) |
| Asad Shafiq 112 (60); Abrar Ahmed 2/9 (4 overs) | | Hassan Nawaz 56 (32); Sohail Khan 2/36 (4 overs) |

Overseas Warriors won by 15 runs
Muzaffarabad Cricket Stadium, Muzaffarabad
Umpires: Aftab Gillani (Pak) and Shozab Raza (Pak)
Player of the match: Asad Shafiq (Overseas Warriors)

- Mirpur Royals won the toss and elected to bowl.
- Asad Shafiq scored his first century in the KPL.

Match 12
19 August 2022
14:00
Scorecard

| Rawalakot Hawks; 156/7 (20 overs) | v | Mirpur Royals; 157/7 (19.1 overs) |
| Rohail Nazir 68 (59); Imad Wasim 3/27 (4 overs) | | Shoaib Malik 33 (19); Faisal Akram 3/41 (4 overs) |

Mirpur Royals won by 3 wickets
Muzaffarabad Cricket Stadium, Muzaffarabad
Umpires: Asif Yaqoob (Pak) and Majid Hussain (Pak)
Player of the match: Imad Wasim (Mirpur Royals)

- Mirpur Royals won the toss and elected to bowl.

Match 15
20 August 2022
19:00 (N)
Scorecard

| Mirpur Royals; 172/4 (20 overs) | v | Jammu Janbaz; 160/8 (20 overs) |
| Hassan Nawaz 68 (44); Mehran Mumtaz 1/26 (4 overs) | | Shahzab 40 (38); Ali Imran 2/7 (1 over) |

Mirpur Royals won by 12 runs
Muzaffarabad Cricket Stadium, Muzaffarabad
Umpires: Faisal Afridi (Pak) and Rashid Riaz (Pak)
Player of the match: Shoaib Malik (Mirpur Royals)

- Jammu Janbaz won the toss and elected to bowl.

Match 19
22 August 2022
19:00 (N)
Scorecard

| Muzaffarabad Tigers; 135/8 (20 overs) | v | Mirpur Royals; 136/4 (14.3 overs) |
| Anwar Ali 44 (29); Shadab Majeed 2/13 (3 overs) | | Muhammad Akhlaq 50* (34); Arshad Iqbal 2/36 (4 overs) |

Mirpur Royals won by 6 wickets
Muzaffarabad Cricket Stadium, Muzaffarabad
Umpires: Imtiaz Iqbal (Pak) and Sajid Afridi (Pak)
Player of the match: Shadab Majeed (Mirpur Royals)

- Mirpur Royals won the toss and elected to bowl.
- Muzaffarabad Tigers were eliminated as a result of this match.

== Playoffs ==
=== Qualifier ===
Match 22
24 August 2022
14:00
Scorecard

| Mirpur Royals | v | Bagh Stallions |

Match Abandoned
Muzaffarabad Cricket Stadium, Muzaffarabad
Umpires: Faisal Afridi (Pak) and Rashid Riaz (Pak)

- Mirpur Royals qualified for the Final due to their better position in the points table.

=== Final ===
Match 25
26 August 2022
19:00 (N)
Scorecard

| Mirpur Royals | v | Bagh Stallions |

Match Abandoned
Muzaffarabad Cricket Stadium, Muzaffarabad
Umpires: Aleem Dar (Pak) and Rashid Riaz (Pak)

- Mirpur Royals won the Final due to their better position in the points table.

== Statistics ==
=== Most runs ===
| Nat. | Player | Matches | Innings | Runs | Average | HS | 100 | 50 |
|---|---|---|---|---|---|---|---|---|
| (Pakistan) | Hassan Nawaz | 6 | 6 | 241 | 40.17 | 68 | 0 | 2 |
| (Pakistan) | Shoaib Malik | 6 | 6 | 182 | 36.40 | 48 | 0 | 0 |
| (Pakistan) | Ali Imran | 6 | 6 | 146 | 24.33 | 84 | 0 | 1 |
| (Pakistan) | Haris Sohail | 6 | 6 | 124 | 24.80 | 55 | 0 | 1 |
| (Pakistan) | Muhammad Akhlaq | 4 | 4 | 89 | 44.50 | 50* | 0 | 1 |

Source: Cricinfo

=== Most wickets ===
| Nat. | Player | Matches | Overs | Wickets | Average | BBI | 4w | 5w |
|---|---|---|---|---|---|---|---|---|
| (Pakistan) | Abrar Ahmed | 5 | 20.0 | 7 | 16.14 | 2/9 | 0 | 0 |
| (Pakistan) | Shadab Majeed | 5 | 17.0 | 7 | 20.43 | 2/13 | 0 | 0 |
| (Pakistan) | Imad Wasim | 5 | 19.0 | 6 | 21.50 | 2/14 | 0 | 0 |
| (Pakistan) | Salman Irshad | 6 | 22.0 | 5 | 41.80 | 2/43 | 0 | 0 |
| (Pakistan) | Sufyan Moqeem | 2 | 6.0 | 3 | 17.33 | 2/30 | 0 | 0 |

Source: Cricinfo
