= Muzaffarabad Tigers in 2022 =

2nd season of Muzaffarabad Tigers in the Kashmir Premier League

Muzaffarabad Tigers
2022 season
- Coach: Misbah-ul-Haq
- Captain: Mohammad Hafeez
- KPL 2022: 7th
- Most runs: Haseebullah Khan (142)
- Most wickets: Arshad Iqbal (9)

Muzaffarabad Tigers is a franchise cricket team that represents Muzaffarabad in the Kashmir Premier League. Mohammad Hafeez was the captain and Misbah-ul-Haq was the coach of the team. Mohammad Hafeez was announced as Muzaffarabad Tigers’ icon player.

== Squad ==
- Players with international caps are listed in **bold**.
- Ages are correct as of 21 July 2022

No.	Name	Nationality	Birth date	Category	Batting style	Bowling style	Year signed	Notes
Batsmen
5	Usman Maroof	Pakistan	1 January 1996 (aged 26)	Kashmiri	Right-handed	Right-arm medium-fast	2022	
47	**Aqib Ilyas**	Oman	5 September 1992 (aged 29)	Kashmiri	Right-handed	Off spin	2022	
75	Taimoor Sultan	Pakistan	4 December 1994 (aged 27)	Silver	Right-handed		2021	
77	Salman Fayyaz	Pakistan	11 August 1997 (aged 24)	Silver	Left-handed	Leg spin	2022	
All-rounders
7	Inzamam-ul-Haq	Pakistan	22 July 1997 (aged 24)	Kashmiri	Right-handed	Slow left arm orthodox	2021	
8	**Mohammad Hafeez**	Pakistan	17 October 1980 (aged 41)	Icon	Right-handed	Right-arm off break	2021	Captain
10	**Saad Bin Zafar**	Canada	10 November 1986 (aged 35)	Kashmiri	Left-handed	Slow left-arm orthodox	2022	
33	**Sohail Tanvir**	Pakistan	1 December 1984 (aged 37)	Platinum	Left-handed	Left-arm medium-fast	2021	
48	**Anwar Ali**	Pakistan	25 November 1987 (aged 34)	Diamond	Right-handed	Right-arm fast-medium	2021	
95	**Iftikhar Ahmed**	Pakistan	3 September 1990 (aged 31)	Platinum	Right-handed	Right-arm off break	2022	
Wicket-keepers
13	Haseebullah Khan	Pakistan	4 March 2004 (aged 18)	Diamond	Left-handed		2022	
60	Zeeshan Ashraf	Pakistan	11 May 1992 (aged 30)	Gold	Left-handed	Right-arm off break	2021	
	Ameer Hamza	Pakistan	22 September 1995 (aged 26)	Supplementary	Right-handed		2022	
Bowlers
9	Amir Khan	Pakistan	9 September 2001 (aged 20)	Emerging	Right-handed	Right-arm medium-fast	2022	
14	Ahmed Daniyal	Pakistan	3 July 1997 (aged 25)	Supplementary	Right-handed	Right-arm medium-fast	2022	
35	**Arshad Iqbal**	Pakistan	26 December 2000 (aged 21)	Gold	Right-handed	Right-arm medium-fast	2021	
42	Aaqib Liaquat	Pakistan	28 May 2001 (aged 21)	Emerging	Right-handed	Leg spin	2022	
92	**Mir Hamza**	Pakistan	10 September 1992 (aged 29)	Silver	Left-handed	Left-arm fast-medium	2022	
	Ahmed Safi Abdullah	Pakistan	1 March 1998 (aged 24)	Silver	Left-handed	Slow left-arm orthodox	2022	
	Osama Fazil	Pakistan		Kashmiri		Right-arm fast	2022	

== Season standings ==
=== Points table ===
Pos	Team	Pld	W	L	NR	Pts	NRR
1	Mirpur Royals (C)	6	4	2	0	8	0.409
2	Bagh Stallions (R)	6	3	2	1	7	0.449
3	Overseas Warriors (3rd)	6	3	2	1	7	0.207
4	Kotli Lions (4th)	6	2	3	1	5	0.457
5	Jammu Janbaz	6	2	3	1	5	−0.322
6	Rawalakot Hawks	6	2	3	1	5	−0.613
7	Muzaffarabad Tigers	6	2	3	1	5	−0.699

Source: Cricinfo
- Top 4 teams qualified for the playoffs
- Advanced to Qualifier
- Advanced to Eliminator 1

Notes:

- C = Champions;
- R = Runner-up;
- (x) = Position at the end of the tournament;

== League fixtures and results ==
Match 3
14 August 2022
19:00 (N)
Scorecard

Bagh Stallions; 52/4 (5 overs)	v	Muzaffarabad Tigers; 53/3 (4.4 overs)
Mohammad Sarwar 25* (15); Mir Hamza 2/17 (2 overs); Arshad Iqbal 2/17 (2 overs)		Iftikhar Ahmed 24* (8); Ali Majid 2/15 (1.4 overs)

Muzaffarabad Tigers won by 7 wickets
Muzaffarabad Cricket Stadium, Muzaffarabad
Umpires: Ahsan Raza (Pak) and Tariq Rasheed (Pak)
Player of the match: Mir Hamza (Muzaffarabad Tigers)

- Muzaffarabad Tigers won the toss and elected to bowl.
- Match reduced to 5 overs per side due to rain.

Match 6
16 August 2022
14:00
Scorecard

Muzaffarabad Tigers; 154/8 (20 overs)	v	Rawalakot Hawks; 155/0 (17.2 overs)
Iftikhar Ahmed 43 (33); Amad Butt 2/24 (4 overs)		Ahmed Shehzad 74* (55); Saad Bin Zafar 0/15 (4 overs)

Rawalakot Hawks won by 10 wickets
Muzaffarabad Cricket Stadium, Muzaffarabad
Umpires: Tariq Rasheed (Pak) and Waleed Yaqub (Pak)
Player of the match: Amad Butt (Rawalakot Hawks)

- Rawalakot Hawks won the toss and elected to bowl.

Match 8
17 August 2022
14:00
Scorecard

Jammu Janbaz	v	Muzaffarabad Tigers

Match Abandoned
Muzaffarabad Cricket Stadium, Muzaffarabad
Umpires: Ghaffar Kazmi (Pak) and Qaiser Waheed (Pak)

Match 13
19 August 2022
19:00 (N)
Scorecard

Overseas Warriors; 147/9 (20 overs)	v	Muzaffarabad Tigers; 138/9 (20 overs)
Saif Badar 57* (40); Arshad Iqbal 3/17 (4 overs)		Ameer Hamza 31 (24); Muhammad Shehzad 2/2 (1 over)

Overseas Warriors won by 9 runs
Muzaffarabad Cricket Stadium, Muzaffarabad
Umpires: Mohammad Asif (Pak) and Nasir Hussain (Pak)
Player of the match: Saif Badar (Overseas Warriors)

- Muzaffarabad Tigers won the toss and elected to bowl.

Match 16
21 August 2022
10:00
Scorecard

Kotli Lions; 156/7 (20 overs)	v	Muzaffarabad Tigers; 149/4 (17.4 overs)
Khurram Manzoor 37 (34); Arshad Iqbal 2/40 (4 overs)		Haseebullah Khan 67 (50); Irfanullah Shah 2/24 (3 overs)

Muzaffarabad Tigers won by 16 runs (DLS method)
Muzaffarabad Cricket Stadium, Muzaffarabad
Umpires: Saqib Khan (Pak) and Zameer Haider (Pak)
Player of the match: Haseebullah Khan (Muzaffarabad Tigers)

- Muzaffarabad Tigers won the toss and elected to bowl.
- Match abandoned due to wet outfield.

Match 19
22 August 2022
19:00 (N)
Scorecard

Muzaffarabad Tigers; 135/8 (20 overs)	v	Mirpur Royals; 136/4 (14.3 overs)
Anwar Ali 44 (29); Shadab Majeed 2/13 (3 overs)		Muhammad Akhlaq 50* (34); Arshad Iqbal 2/36 (4 overs)

Mirpur Royals won by 6 wickets
Muzaffarabad Cricket Stadium, Muzaffarabad
Umpires: Imtiaz Iqbal (Pak) and Sajid Afridi (Pak)
Player of the match: Shadab Majeed (Mirpur Royals)

- Mirpur Royals won the toss and elected to bowl.
- Muzaffarabad Tigers were eliminated as a result of this match.

== Statistics ==
=== Most runs ===
Nat.	Player	Matches	Innings	Runs	Average	HS	100	50
(Pakistan)	Haseebullah Khan	5	5	142	28.40	67	0	1
(Pakistan)	Anwar Ali	5	5	108	36.00	44	0	0
(Pakistan)	Mohammad Hafeez	5	5	95	19.00	62	0	1
(Pakistan)	Iftikhar Ahmed	4	4	74	24.67	43	0	0
(Pakistan)	Ameer Hamza	3	3	40	20.00	31	0	0

Source: Cricinfo

=== Most wickets ===
Nat.	Player	Matches	Overs	Wickets	Average	BBI	4w	5w
(Pakistan)	Arshad Iqbal	5	18.0	9	15.89	3/17	0	0
(Pakistan)	Mir Hamza	5	16.0	4	34.25	2/17	0	0
(Pakistan)	Salman Fayyaz	2	6.2	2	30.50	2/27	0	0
(Pakistan)	Sohail Tanvir	4	11.3	2	58.50	1/20	0	0
(Canada)	Saad Bin Zafar	4	15.0	1	94.00	1/25	0	0

Source: Cricinfo
