= Jammu Janbaz in 2022 =

1st season of Jammu Janbaz in the Kashmir Premier League

Jammu Janbaz
2022 season
- Coach: Riaz Afridi
- Captain: Faheem Ashraf
- KPL 2022: 5th
- Most runs: Sharjeel Khan (273)
- Most wickets: Mehran Mumtaz (4); Usama Mir (4)

Jammu Janbaz is a franchise cricket team that represents Jammu in the Kashmir Premier League. Faheem Ashraf was the captain and Riaz Afridi was the coach of the team in the 2022 season of the tournament. Sharjeel Khan was announced as Jammu Janbaz’s icon player.

== Squad ==
- Players with international caps are listed in **bold**.
- Ages are correct as of 21 July 2022

No.	Name	Nationality	Birth date	Category	Batting style	Bowling style	Year signed	Notes
Batsmen
9	Samiullah Afridi	Pakistan	11 November 1996 (aged 25)	Emerging	Right-handed	Leg spin	2022	
51	**Sahibzada Farhan**	Pakistan	6 March 1996 (aged 26)	Diamond	Right-handed		2022	
96	**Umar Akmal**	Pakistan	26 May 1990 (aged 32)	Diamond	Right-handed	Off spin	2022	
98	**Sharjeel Khan**	Pakistan	14 August 1989 (aged 32)	Icon	Left-handed	Leg spin	2022	
	Umar Siddiq	Pakistan	10 October 2000 (aged 21)	Silver	Left-handed	Off spin	2022	
All-rounders
10	**Shahid Afridi**	Pakistan	1 March 1977 (aged 45)	Platinum	Right-handed	Leg spin	2022	Mentor
41	**Faheem Ashraf**	Pakistan	16 January 1994 (aged 28)	Platinum	Left-handed	Right-arm fast medium	2022	Captain
	Ahmed Khan	Pakistan	1 May 2004 (aged 18)	Silver	Right-handed	Right-arm medium	2022	
	Akash Afridi	Pakistan	16 March 1992 (aged 30)	Supplementary	Right-handed	Right-arm fast-medium	2022	
	Azaz Khan	Pakistan	22 September 1984 (aged 37)	Supplementary	Right-handed		2022	
	Mohammad Shehzad	Pakistan	30 September 1990 (aged 31)	Kashmiri	Right-handed		2022	
Wicket-keepers
75	Shahzaib	Pakistan		Silver			2022	
Bowlers
8	Faisal Altaf	United Arab Emirates	15 March 2001 (aged 21)	Kashmiri	Right-handed	Right-arm fast-medium	2022	
11	Mehran Mumtaz	Pakistan	7 March 2003 (aged 19)	Kashmiri	Right-handed	Right-arm medium-fast	2022	
17	**Imran Khan**	Pakistan	15 July 1987 (aged 35)	Silver	Right-handed	Right-arm fast-medium	2022	
23	Usama Mir	Pakistan	23 December 1995 (aged 26)	Gold	Right-handed	Leg spin	2022	
88	Akif Javed	Pakistan	10 October 2000 (aged 21)	Gold	Right-handed	Left-arm medium-fast	2022	
	Hamza Shah Afridi	Pakistan	26 October 2002 (aged 19)	Emerging	Right-handed	Right-arm medium-fast	2022	
	Najam Naseer Kiyani	Pakistan	2 October 2001 (aged 20)	Kashmiri	Left-handed	Left-arm unorthodox spin	2022	
	Naqash Basharat	Pakistan	4 April 1992 (aged 30)	Kashmiri	Left-handed	Left-arm medium-fast	2022	

== Season standings ==
=== Points table ===
Pos	Team	Pld	W	L	NR	Pts	NRR
1	Mirpur Royals (C)	6	4	2	0	8	0.409
2	Bagh Stallions (R)	6	3	2	1	7	0.449
3	Overseas Warriors (3rd)	6	3	2	1	7	0.207
4	Kotli Lions (4th)	6	2	3	1	5	0.457
5	Jammu Janbaz	6	2	3	1	5	−0.322
6	Rawalakot Hawks	6	2	3	1	5	−0.613
7	Muzaffarabad Tigers	6	2	3	1	5	−0.699

Source: Cricinfo
- Top 4 teams qualified for the playoffs
- Advanced to Qualifier
- Advanced to Eliminator 1

Notes:

- C = Champions;
- R = Runner-up;
- (x) = Position at the end of the tournament;

== League fixtures and results ==
Match 1
13 August 2022
19:00 (N)
Scorecard

Jammu Janbaz; 178/4 (20 overs)	v	Rawalakot Hawks; 50/1 (5.1 overs)
Sharjeel Khan 89 (51); Mohammad Amir 1/28 (4 overs)		Bismillah Khan 16* (10); Imran Khan 1/15 (2 overs)

Rawalakot Hawks won by 11 runs (DLS method)
Muzaffarabad Cricket Stadium, Muzaffarabad
Umpires: Asif Yaqoob (Pak) and Shozab Raza (Pak)
Player of the match: Sharjeel Khan (Jammu Janbaz)

- Rawalakot Hawks won the toss and elected to bowl.
- Match abandoned due to wet outfield.

Match 4
15 August 2022
14:00
Scorecard

Overseas Warriors; 101/3 (8 overs)	v	Jammu Janbaz; 105/5 (7.5 overs)
Mohammad Imran 29 (12); Usama Mir 2/16 (2 overs)		Shahzab 40 (18); Sohail Khan 3/14 (2 overs)

Jammu Janbaz won by 5 wickets
Muzaffarabad Cricket Stadium, Muzaffarabad
Umpires: Aaley Haider (Pak) and Ahsan Raza (Pak)
Player of the match: Shahzab (Jammu Janbaz)

- Jammu Janbaz won the toss and elected to field.
- Match reduced to 8 overs per side due to rain.
- Sohail Khan took his first hat-trick in the KPL.

Match 8
17 August 2022
14:00
Scorecard

Jammu Janbaz	v	Muzaffarabad Tigers

Match Abandoned
Muzaffarabad Cricket Stadium, Muzaffarabad
Umpires: Ghaffar Kazmi (Pak) and Qaiser Waheed (Pak)

Match 11
18 August 2022
21:00 (N)
Scorecard

Jammu Janbaz; 162/8 (20 overs)	v	Kotli Lions; 166/6 (19.2 overs)
Sharjeel Khan 81 (48); Hassan Khan 2/11 (3 overs)		Ahsan Ali 53 (36); Mehran Mumtaz 2/29 (4 overs)

Kotli Lions won by 4 wickets
Muzaffarabad Cricket Stadium, Muzaffarabad
Umpires: Ahsan Raza (Pak) and Nasir Hussain (Pak)
Player of the match: Sarfaraz Ahmed (Kotli Lions)

- Kotli Lions won the toss and elected to bowl.

Match 15
20 August 2022
19:00 (N)
Scorecard

Mirpur Royals; 172/4 (20 overs)	v	Jammu Janbaz; 160/8 (20 overs)
Hassan Nawaz 68 (44); Mehran Mumtaz 1/26 (4 overs)		Shahzab 40 (38); Ali Imran 2/7 (1 over)

Mirpur Royals won by 12 runs
Muzaffarabad Cricket Stadium, Muzaffarabad
Umpires: Faisal Afridi (Pak) and Rashid Riaz (Pak)
Player of the match: Shoaib Malik (Mirpur Royals)

- Jammu Janbaz won the toss and elected to bowl.

Match 18
22 August 2022
14:00
Scorecard

Jammu Janbaz; 169 (19.1 overs)	v	Bagh Stallions; 165/9 (20 overs)
Sharjeel Khan 66 (31); Aamer Jamal 4/40 (4 overs)		Kamran Akmal 51 (31); Ahmed Khan 3/28 (4 overs)

Jammu Janbaz won by 4 runs
Muzaffarabad Cricket Stadium, Muzaffarabad
Umpires: Ahmed Shahab (Pak) and Aleem Dar (Pak)
Player of the match: Sharjeel Khan (Jammu Janbaz)

- Jammu Janbaz won the toss and elected to bat.
- Jammu Janbaz were eliminated as a result of this match.

== Statistics ==
=== Most runs ===
Nat.	Player	Matches	Innings	Runs	Average	HS	100	50
(Pakistan)	Sharjeel Khan	5	5	273	54.60	89	0	3
(Pakistan)	Shahzab	5	5	118	23.60	40	0	0
(Pakistan)	Sahibzada Farhan	5	5	84	16.80	56	0	1
(Pakistan)	Faheem Ashraf	5	4	62	15.50	25	0	0
(Pakistan)	Shahid Afridi	2	2	52	26.00	37	0	0

Source: Cricinfo

=== Most wickets ===
Nat.	Player	Matches	Overs	Wickets	Average	BBI	4w	5w
(Pakistan)	Mehran Mumtaz	4	13.1	4	21.50	2/29	0	0
(Pakistan)	Usama Mir	4	14.0	4	24.25	2/16	0	0
(Pakistan)	Faheem Ashraf	5	15.0	3	43.00	2/34	0	0
(Pakistan)	Ahmed Khan	2	5.0	3	16.00	3/28	0	0
(Pakistan)	Najam Naseer Kiyani	1	4.0	3	13.67	3/41	0	0

Source: Cricinfo
