= Kotli Lions in 2022 =

2nd season of Kotli Lions in the Kashmir Premier League

Kotli Lions
2022 season
- Coach: Saeed Azad (until 18 August); Mushtaq Ahmed (from 18 August)
- Captain: Khurram Manzoor
- KPL 2022: 4th
- Most runs: Ahsan Ali (168)
- Most wickets: Basit Ali (7); Irfanullah Shah (7)

Kotli Lions is a franchise cricket team that represents Kotli in the Kashmir Premier League. Khurram Manzoor was the captain and Mushtaq Ahmed was the coach of the team. Saeed Azad was originally Kotli Lions’ head coach but was replaced by Mushtaq Ahmed. Khurram Manzoor was announced as Kotli Lions’ icon player.

== Squad ==
- Players with international caps are listed in **bold**.
- Ages are correct as of 21 July 2022

No.	Name	Nationality	Birth date	Category	Batting style	Bowling style	Year signed	Notes
Batsmen
6	Imran Shah	Pakistan	16 June 1999 (aged 23)	Emerging	Right-handed		2022	
12	**Ahsan Ali**	Pakistan	10 December 1993 (aged 28)	Diamond	Right-handed	Leg break	2021	
18	Naveed Malik	Pakistan	18 March 1995 (aged 27)	Kashmiri	Right-handed	Right-arm medium-fast	2022	
42	**Khurram Manzoor**	Pakistan	10 June 1986 (aged 36)	Icon	Right-handed	Right-arm off spin	2022	Captain
44	Khalid Usman	Pakistan	1 March 1986 (aged 36)	Gold	Right-handed	Left-arm orthodox spin	2021	
100	Omair Yousuf	Pakistan	27 December 1998 (aged 23)		Right-handed		2022	Post-draft signing
	Hanif Azad	Pakistan	7 August 1997 (aged 24)	Silver	Right-handed		2022	
All-rounders
17	Hasan Mohsin	Pakistan	11 January 1998 (aged 24)	Silver	Right-handed	Right-arm medium	2022	
22	**Danish Aziz**	Pakistan	20 November 1995 (aged 26)	Platinum	Left-handed	Slow left-arm orthodox	2022	
	Basit Ali	Pakistan		Kashmiri			2022	
	Mirwais Khan	Pakistan	4 May 1991 (aged 31)		Right-handed	Right-arm medium-fast	2022	Post-draft signing
Wicket-keepers
54	**Sarfaraz Ahmed**	Pakistan	22 May 1987 (aged 35)	Platinum	Right-handed	Right-arm off spin	2022	
	Abdul Rehman	Pakistan		Supplementary			2021	
Bowlers
03	Mujtaba Ghayas	Pakistan	27 July 1987 (aged 34)	Kashmiri	Right-handed	Right-arm medium	2021	
5	Nadeem Khalil	Pakistan	1 November 1997 (aged 24)	Kashmiri	Right-handed	Right-arm fast-medium	2021	
8	Khurram Shehzad	Pakistan	25 November 1999 (aged 22)	Diamond	Right-handed	Right-arm medium	2021	
16	Hassan Khan	Pakistan	16 October 1998 (aged 23)	Silver	Right-handed	Left-arm orthodox	2022	
23	Irfan Ali Qasmi	Pakistan		Emerging	Right-handed	Leg spin	2022	
97	Irfanullah Shah	Pakistan	5 May 1995 (aged 27)	Gold	Right-handed	Right-arm medium-fast	2021	
	Mushtaq Kalhoro	Pakistan	13 March 1997 (aged 25)	Silver	Right-handed	Right-arm medium-fast	2022	
	Zayyan Khan	Pakistan		Kashmiri			2022	

== Season standings ==
=== Points table ===
Pos	Team	Pld	W	L	NR	Pts	NRR
1	Mirpur Royals (C)	6	4	2	0	8	0.409
2	Bagh Stallions (R)	6	3	2	1	7	0.449
3	Overseas Warriors (3rd)	6	3	2	1	7	0.207
4	Kotli Lions (4th)	6	2	3	1	5	0.457
5	Jammu Janbaz	6	2	3	1	5	−0.322
6	Rawalakot Hawks	6	2	3	1	5	−0.613
7	Muzaffarabad Tigers	6	2	3	1	5	−0.699

Source: Cricinfo
- Top 4 teams qualified for the playoffs
- Advanced to Qualifier
- Advanced to Eliminator 1

Notes:

- C = Champions;
- R = Runner-up;
- (x) = Position at the end of the tournament;

== League fixtures and results ==
Match 2
14 August 2022
14:00
Scorecard

Kotli Lions; 151/6 (20 overs)	v	Mirpur Royals; 152/4 (19.4 overs)
Danish Aziz 52* (43); Zubair Lodhi 2/43 (4 overs)		Ali Imran 84 (57); Khurram Shahzad 3/27 (4 overs)

Mirpur Royals won by 6 wickets
Muzaffarabad Cricket Stadium, Muzaffarabad
Umpires: Imran Javed (Pak) and Shozab Raza (Pak)
Player of the match: Ali Imran (Mirpur Royals)

- Mirpur Royals won the toss and elected to bowl.

Match 7
16 August 2022
19:00 (N)
Scorecard

Kotli Lions	v	Overseas Warriors

Match Abandoned
Muzaffarabad Cricket Stadium, Muzaffarabad
Umpires: Aaley Haider (Pak) and Asif Yaqoob (Pak)

Match 11
18 August 2022
21:00 (N)
Scorecard

Jammu Janbaz; 162/8 (20 overs)	v	Kotli Lions; 166/6 (19.2 overs)
Sharjeel Khan 81 (48); Hassan Khan 2/11 (3 overs)		Ahsan Ali 53 (36); Mehran Mumtaz 2/29 (4 overs)

Kotli Lions won by 4 wickets
Muzaffarabad Cricket Stadium, Muzaffarabad
Umpires: Ahsan Raza (Pak) and Nasir Hussain (Pak)
Player of the match: Sarfaraz Ahmed (Kotli Lions)

- Kotli Lions won the toss and elected to bowl.

Match 14
20 August 2022
14:00
Scorecard

Kotli Lions; 86/4 (9 overs)	v	Bagh Stallions; 88/4 (7.4 overs)
Ahsan Ali 37 (20); Rumman Raees 3/11 (2 overs)		Kamran Akmal 37 (17); Basit Ali 2/19 (2 overs)

Bagh Stallions won by 6 wickets (DLS method)
Muzaffarabad Cricket Stadium, Muzaffarabad
Umpires: Mohammad Asif (Pak) and Mohammad Sajid (Pak)
Player of the match: Rumman Raees (Bagh Stallions)

- Bagh Stallions won the toss and elected to field.
- Match reduced to 9 overs per side due to rain.
- Bagh Stallions were set a revised target of 88 runs.

Match 16
21 August 2022
10:00
Scorecard

Kotli Lions; 156/7 (20 overs)	v	Muzaffarabad Tigers; 149/4 (17.4 overs)
Khurram Manzoor 37 (34); Arshad Iqbal 2/40 (4 overs)		Haseebullah Khan 67 (50); Irfanullah Shah 2/24 (3 overs)

Muzaffarabad Tigers won by 16 runs (DLS method)
Muzaffarabad Cricket Stadium, Muzaffarabad
Umpires: Saqib Khan (Pak) and Zameer Haider (Pak)
Player of the match: Haseebullah Khan (Muzaffarabad Tigers)

- Muzaffarabad Tigers won the toss and elected to bowl.
- Match abandoned due to wet outfield.

Match 21
23 August 2022
19:00 (N)
Scorecard

Rawalakot Hawks; 133/9 (18 overs)	v	Kotli Lions; 136/0 (11.1 overs)
Amad Butt 47* (24); Irfanullah Shah 3/35 (4 overs)		Khurram Manzoor 85* (42); Faisal Akram 0/11 (1 over)

Kotli Lions won by 10 wickets
Muzaffarabad Cricket Stadium, Muzaffarabad
Umpires: Saqib Khan (Pak) and Zameer Haider (Pak)
Player of the match: Khurram Manzoor (Kotli Lions)

- Kotli Lions won the toss and elected to field.
- Match reduced to 18 overs per side due to rain.
- Rawalakot Hawks were eliminated as a result of this match.

== Playoffs ==
=== Eliminator 1 ===
Match 23
24 August 2022
19:00 (N)
Scorecard

Overseas Warriors	v	Kotli Lions

Match Abandoned
Muzaffarabad Cricket Stadium, Muzaffarabad

- Overseas Warriors qualified for Eliminator 2 due to their better position in the points table.

== Statistics ==
=== Most runs ===
Nat.	Player	Matches	Innings	Runs	Average	HS	100	50
(Pakistan)	Ahsan Ali	5	5	168	42.00	53	0	1
(Pakistan)	Khurram Manzoor	5	5	130	32.50	85*	0	1
(Pakistan)	Sarfaraz Ahmed	5	4	119	119.00	52*	0	1
(Pakistan)	Danish Aziz	5	4	85	28.33	52*	0	1
(Pakistan)	Hassan Khan	5	4	52	17.33	27	0	0

Source: Cricinfo

=== Most wickets ===
Nat.	Player	Matches	Overs	Wickets	Average	BBI	4w	5w
(Pakistan)	Basit Ali	5	15.3	7	17.85	2/19	0	0
(Pakistan)	Irfanullah Shah	5	17.0	7	20.57	3/35	0	0
(Pakistan)	Khurram Shahzad	5	16.0	5	31.80	3/27	0	0
(Pakistan)	Danish Aziz	4	11.0	3	27.33	2/27	0	0
(Pakistan)	Hassan Khan	5	14.2	3	35.67	2/11	0	0

Source: Cricinfo
