= Bagh Stallions in 2022 =

2nd season of Bagh Stallions in the Kashmir Premier League

Bagh Stallions
2022 season
- Coach: Abdul Rehman
- Captain: Umar Amin; Rumman Raees
- KPL 2022: 2nd (runner-up)
- Most runs: Sohaib Maqsood (119)
- Most wickets: Rumman Raees (8)

Bagh Stallions is a franchise cricket team that represents Bagh in the Kashmir Premier League. Umar Amin was the captain and Abdul Rehman was the coach of the team. Rumman Raees was announced as vice-captain. Kamran Akmal was announced as Bagh Stallions’ icon player.

== Squad ==
- Players with international caps are listed in **bold**.
- Ages are correct as of 21 July 2022

No.	Name	Nationality	Birth date	Category	Batting style	Bowling style	Year signed	Notes
Batsmen
12	**Sohaib Maqsood**	Pakistan	15 April 1987 (aged 35)	Platinum	Right-handed	Right-arm off break	2022	
45	Hasan Raza	Pakistan	6 January 1995 (aged 27)	Kashmiri	Left-handed	Right-arm medium-fast	2022	
	Abdul Bangalzai	Pakistan	4 March 2003 (aged 19)	Supplementary	Right-handed		2022	
All-rounders
8	**Umar Amin**	Pakistan	16 October 1989 (aged 32)	Diamond	Left-handed	Right-arm medium	2022	Captain
10	Sharoon Siraj	Pakistan	14 September 1997 (aged 24)	Silver	Right-handed	Right-arm off spin	2022	
34	**Aamer Yamin**	Pakistan	26 June 1990 (aged 32)	Diamond	Right-handed	Right-arm medium	2021	
41	Aamer Jamal	Pakistan	5 July 1996 (aged 26)	Silver	Right-handed	Right-arm off break	2022	Replacement pick
65	Kashif Bhatti	Pakistan	25 July 1986 (aged 35)	Gold	Right-handed	Left-arm orthodox	2022	
	Atizaz Habib Khan	Pakistan	1 March 1997 (aged 25)	Silver	Right-handed	Right-arm off spin	2022	
	Mohammad Sarwar	Pakistan	20 January 1995 (aged 27)	Silver	Right-handed	Right-arm fast-medium	2022	
Wicket-keepers
23	**Kamran Akmal**	Pakistan	13 January 1982 (aged 40)	Icon	Right-handed		2022	
	Awais Akram	Pakistan	10 March 2000 (aged 22)	Kashmiri	Right-handed		2022	Replacement pick
	Sajjad Ali	Pakistan	3 February 1990 (aged 32)	Emerging	Right-handed		2022	
Bowlers
9	Arsalan Arif	Pakistan	5 January 1993 (aged 29)	Kashmiri	Left-handed	Slow left-arm orthodox	2022	
11	**Rumman Raees**	Pakistan	18 October 1991 (aged 30)	Platinum	Right-handed	Left-arm fast-medium	2022	Vice-captain
14	Mohammad Imran	Pakistan	20 January 2001 (aged 21)	Gold	Right-handed	Left-arm fast-medium	2021	
26	Danyal Allah Ditta	Pakistan	2 July 1995 (aged 27)	Kashmiri	Left-handed	Left-arm slow left-arm orthodox	2022	
55	Maaz Khan	Pakistan	15 December 2000 (aged 21)	Emerging	Right-handed	Right-arm leg spin	2022	
	Ahmed Jamal	Pakistan	3 September 1988 (aged 33)	Silver	Right-handed	Right-arm medium	2022	
	Ali Majid	Pakistan	29 December 1991 (aged 30)	Supplementary	Right-handed	Right-arm medium-fast	2022	
	Amir Shehzad	Pakistan	9 December 1983 (aged 38)	Kashmiri	Right-handed	Right-arm medium-fast	2022	

== Season standings ==
=== Points table ===
Pos	Team	Pld	W	L	NR	Pts	NRR
1	Mirpur Royals (C)	6	4	2	0	8	0.409
2	Bagh Stallions (R)	6	3	2	1	7	0.449
3	Overseas Warriors (3rd)	6	3	2	1	7	0.207
4	Kotli Lions (4th)	6	2	3	1	5	0.457
5	Jammu Janbaz	6	2	3	1	5	−0.322
6	Rawalakot Hawks	6	2	3	1	5	−0.613
7	Muzaffarabad Tigers	6	2	3	1	5	−0.699

Source: Cricinfo
- Top 4 teams qualified for the playoffs
- Advanced to Qualifier
- Advanced to Eliminator 1

Notes:

- C = Champions;
- R = Runner-up;
- (x) = Position at the end of the tournament;

== League fixtures and results ==
Match 3
14 August 2022
19:00 (N)
Scorecard

Bagh Stallions; 52/4 (5 overs)	v	Muzaffarabad Tigers; 53/3 (4.4 overs)
Mohammad Sarwar 25* (15); Mir Hamza 2/17 (2 overs); Arshad Iqbal 2/17 (2 overs)		Iftikhar Ahmed 24* (8); Ali Majid 2/15 (1.4 overs)

Muzaffarabad Tigers won by 7 wickets
Muzaffarabad Cricket Stadium, Muzaffarabad
Umpires: Ahsan Raza (Pak) and Tariq Rasheed (Pak)
Player of the match: Mir Hamza (Muzaffarabad Tigers)

- Muzaffarabad Tigers won the toss and elected to bowl.
- Match reduced to 5 overs per side due to rain.

Match 5
15 August 2022
19:00 (N)
Scorecard

Bagh Stallions; 189/5 (20 overs)	v	Mirpur Royals; 181/4 (20 overs)
Sohaib Maqsood 72* (53); Abrar Ahmed 2/24 (4 overs)		Ali Imran 47 (28); Aamer Jamal 2/39 (4 overs)

Bagh Stallions won by 8 runs
Muzaffarabad Cricket Stadium, Muzaffarabad
Umpires: Ghaffar Kazmi (Pak) and Imran Javed (Pak)
Player of the match: Sohaib Maqsood (Bagh Stallions)

- Mirpur Royals won the toss and elected to field.

Match 9
17 August 2022
21:00 (N)
Scorecard

Rawalakot Hawks	v	Bagh Stallions

Match Abandoned
Muzaffarabad Cricket Stadium, Muzaffarabad
Umpires: Ahsan Raza (Pak) and Waleed Yaqub (Pak)

Match 14
20 August 2022
14:00
Scorecard

Kotli Lions; 86/4 (9 overs)	v	Bagh Stallions; 88/4 (7.4 overs)
Ahsan Ali 37 (20); Rumman Raees 3/11 (2 overs)		Kamran Akmal 37 (17); Basit Ali 2/19 (2 overs)

Bagh Stallions won by 6 wickets (DLS method)
Muzaffarabad Cricket Stadium, Muzaffarabad
Umpires: Mohammad Asif (Pak) and Mohammad Sajid (Pak)
Player of the match: Rumman Raees (Bagh Stallions)

- Bagh Stallions won the toss and elected to field.
- Match reduced to 9 overs per side due to rain.
- Bagh Stallions were set a revised target of 88 runs.

Match 18
22 August 2022
14:00
Scorecard

Jammu Janbaz; 169 (19.1 overs)	v	Bagh Stallions; 165/9 (20 overs)
Sharjeel Khan 66 (31); Aamer Jamal 4/40 (4 overs)		Kamran Akmal 51 (31); Ahmed Khan 3/28 (4 overs)

Jammu Janbaz won by 4 runs
Muzaffarabad Cricket Stadium, Muzaffarabad
Umpires: Ahmed Shahab (Pak) and Aleem Dar (Pak)
Player of the match: Sharjeel Khan (Jammu Janbaz)

- Jammu Janbaz won the toss and elected to bat.
- Jammu Janbaz were eliminated as a result of this match.

Match 20
23 August 2022
14:00
Scorecard

Overseas Warriors; 127 (19.5 overs)	v	Bagh Stallions; 70/3 (9 overs)
Kamran Ghulam 32 (24); Ali Majid 3/13 (4 overs)		Abdul Bangalzai 30 (20); Sohail Khan 2/14 (2 overs)

Bagh Stallions won by 15 runs (DLS method)
Muzaffarabad Cricket Stadium, Muzaffarabad
Umpires: Ahmed Shahab (Pak) and Imtiaz Iqbal (Pak)
Player of the match: Ali Majid (Bagh Stallions)

- Bagh Stallions won the toss and elected to bowl.
- Match abandoned due to wet outfield.

== Playoffs ==
=== Qualifier ===
Match 22
24 August 2022
14:00
Scorecard

Mirpur Royals	v	Bagh Stallions

Match Abandoned
Muzaffarabad Cricket Stadium, Muzaffarabad
Umpires: Faisal Afridi (Pak) and Rashid Riaz (Pak)

- Mirpur Royals qualified for the Final due to their better position in the points table.

=== Eliminator 2 ===
Match 24
25 August 2022
19:00 (N)
Scorecard

Bagh Stallions	v	Overseas Warriors

Match Abandoned
Muzaffarabad Cricket Stadium, Muzaffarabad

- Bagh Stallions qualified for the Final due to their better position in the points table.

=== Final ===
Match 25
26 August 2022
19:00 (N)
Scorecard

Mirpur Royals	v	Bagh Stallions

Match Abandoned
Muzaffarabad Cricket Stadium, Muzaffarabad
Umpires: Aleem Dar (Pak) and Rashid Riaz (Pak)

- Mirpur Royals won the Final due to their better position in the points table.

== Statistics ==
=== Most runs ===
Nat.	Player	Matches	Innings	Runs	Average	HS	100	50
(Pakistan)	Sohaib Maqsood	5	5	119	29.75	72*	0	1
(Pakistan)	Kamran Akmal	5	5	99	19.80	51	0	1
(Pakistan)	Iftikhar Ahmed	5	4	87	29.00	27	0	0
(Pakistan)	Hasan Raza	5	4	56	28.00	36	0	0
(Pakistan)	Umar Amin	4	3	51	25.50	25	0	0

Source: Cricinfo

=== Most wickets ===
Nat.	Player	Matches	Overs	Wickets	Average	BBI	4w	5w
(Pakistan)	Rumman Raees	6	18.4	8	21.00	3/11	0	0
(Pakistan)	Aamer Jamal	3	10.0	6	16.00	4/40	1	0
(Pakistan)	Ali Majid	5	15.4	6	17.50	3/13	0	0
(Pakistan)	Aamer Yamin	5	15.0	4	28.00	2/25	0	0
(Pakistan)	Arsalan Arif	1	4.0	2	12.50	2/25	0	0

Source: Cricinfo
