= Rawalakot Hawks in 2022 =

2nd season of Rawalakot Hawks in the Kashmir Premier League

Rawalakot Hawks
2022 season
- Coach: Arshad Khan
- Captain: Ahmed Shehzad
- KPL 2022: 6th
- Most runs: Ahmed Shehzad (164)
- Most wickets: Zaman Khan (5); Faisal Akram (5)

Rawalakot Hawks is a franchise cricket team that represents Rawalakot in the Kashmir Premier League. Ahmed Shehzad was the captain and Arshad Khan was the coach of the team. Mohammad Amir was announced as Rawalakot Hawks’ icon player.

== Squad ==
- Players with international caps are listed in **bold**.
- Ages are correct as of 21 July 2022

No.	Name	Nationality	Birth date	Category	Batting style	Bowling style	Year signed	Notes
Batsmen
6	Babar Khaliq	Pakistan	3 February 1991 (aged 31)	Kashmiri	Right-handed	Off spin	2022	Replacement pick
7	**Ahmed Shehzad**	Pakistan	23 November 1991 (aged 30)	Platinum	Right-handed	Right-arm leg break	2021	
27	Kashif Ali	England	7 February 1998 (aged 24)	Kashmiri	Right-handed	Leg spin	2021	
	Ammad Alam	Pakistan	3 October 1998 (aged 23)	Silver	Right-handed		2022	
	Musadiq Ahmed	Pakistan	1 May 1989 (aged 33)	Silver	Right-handed		2022	
	Saeedullah	Pakistan		Emerging			2022	
	Zeeshan Malik	Pakistan	26 December 1996 (aged 25)	Silver	Right-handed	Off spin	2022	
All-rounders
12	**Hussain Talat**	Pakistan	12 February 1996 (aged 26)	Platinum	Right-handed	Right-arm fast-medium	2021	
15	Sohail Akhtar	Pakistan	2 March 1986 (aged 36)	Supplementary	Right-handed	Right-arm medium	2022	
37	Amad Butt	Pakistan	10 June 1995 (aged 27)	Gold	Right-handed	Right-arm fast	2022	
65	Asif Afridi	Pakistan	25 December 1986 (aged 35)	Diamond	Left-handed	Slow left-arm orthodox	2021	
	Khawaja Muhammad Bilal	Pakistan		Kashmiri			2022	Replacement pick
	Saif Zaib	England	22 May 1998 (aged 24)	Kashmiri	Left-handed	Slow left-arm orthodox	2022	
Wicket-keepers
18	Rohail Nazir	Pakistan	10 October 2001 (aged 20)	Kashmiri	Right-handed		2022	Replacement pick
29	Bismillah Khan	Pakistan	1 March 1990 (aged 32)	Gold	Right-handed		2021	
	Raja Farhan Khan	Pakistan		Kashmiri			2022	
Bowlers
1	Sameen Gul	Pakistan	4 February 1999 (aged 23)	Supplementary	Right-handed	Right-arm medium	2022	
5	**Mohammad Amir**	Pakistan	13 March 1992 (aged 30)	Icon	Left-handed	Left-arm fast	2022	
9	Faisal Akram	Pakistan	20 August 2003 (aged 18)	Silver	Left-handed	Left-arm unorthodox spin	2022	
50	Ihsanullah	Pakistan	11 October 2002 (aged 19)	Emerging	Right-handed	Right-arm fast	2022	
99	Zaman Khan	Pakistan	10 September 2001 (aged 20)	Diamond	Right-handed	Right-arm fast-medium	2021	
	Atif Sheikh	England	18 February 1991 (aged 31)	Kashmiri	Right-handed	Left-arm medium-fast	2022	
	Rohaan Qadri	Pakistan		Kashmiri		Leg spin	2022	Replacement pick
	Zain-ul-Hassan	England	28 October 2000 (aged 21)	Kashmiri	Left-handed	Right-arm medium	2022	

== Season standings ==
=== Points table ===
Pos	Team	Pld	W	L	NR	Pts	NRR
1	Mirpur Royals (C)	6	4	2	0	8	0.409
2	Bagh Stallions (R)	6	3	2	1	7	0.449
3	Overseas Warriors (3rd)	6	3	2	1	7	0.207
4	Kotli Lions (4th)	6	2	3	1	5	0.457
5	Jammu Janbaz	6	2	3	1	5	−0.322
6	Rawalakot Hawks	6	2	3	1	5	−0.613
7	Muzaffarabad Tigers	6	2	3	1	5	−0.699

Source: Cricinfo
- Top 4 teams qualified for the playoffs
- Advanced to Qualifier
- Advanced to Eliminator 1

Notes:

- C = Champions;
- R = Runner-up;
- (x) = Position at the end of the tournament;

== League fixtures and results ==
Match 1
13 August 2022
19:00 (N)
Scorecard

Jammu Janbaz; 178/4 (20 overs)	v	Rawalakot Hawks; 50/1 (5.1 overs)
Sharjeel Khan 89 (51); Mohammad Amir 1/28 (4 overs)		Bismillah Khan 16* (10); Imran Khan 1/15 (2 overs)

Rawalakot Hawks won by 11 runs (DLS method)
Muzaffarabad Cricket Stadium, Muzaffarabad
Umpires: Asif Yaqoob (Pak) and Shozab Raza (Pak)
Player of the match: Sharjeel Khan (Jammu Janbaz)

- Rawalakot Hawks won the toss and elected to bowl.
- Match abandoned due to wet outfield.

Match 6
16 August 2022
14:00
Scorecard

Muzaffarabad Tigers; 154/8 (20 overs)	v	Rawalakot Hawks; 155/0 (17.2 overs)
Iftikhar Ahmed 43 (33); Amad Butt 2/24 (4 overs)		Ahmed Shehzad 74* (55); Saad Bin Zafar 0/15 (4 overs)

Rawalakot Hawks won by 10 wickets
Muzaffarabad Cricket Stadium, Muzaffarabad
Umpires: Tariq Rasheed (Pak) and Waleed Yaqub (Pak)
Player of the match: Amad Butt (Rawalakot Hawks)

- Rawalakot Hawks won the toss and elected to bowl.

Match 9
17 August 2022
21:00 (N)
Scorecard

Rawalakot Hawks	v	Bagh Stallions

Match Abandoned
Muzaffarabad Cricket Stadium, Muzaffarabad
Umpires: Ahsan Raza (Pak) and Waleed Yaqub (Pak)

Match 12
19 August 2022
14:00
Scorecard

Rawalakot Hawks; 156/7 (20 overs)	v	Mirpur Royals; 157/7 (19.1 overs)
Rohail Nazir 68 (59); Imad Wasim 3/27 (4 overs)		Shoaib Malik 33 (19); Faisal Akram 3/41 (4 overs)

Mirpur Royals won by 3 wickets
Muzaffarabad Cricket Stadium, Muzaffarabad
Umpires: Asif Yaqoob (Pak) and Majid Hussain (Pak)
Player of the match: Imad Wasim (Mirpur Royals)

- Mirpur Royals won the toss and elected to bowl.

Match 17
21 August 2022
21:00 (N)
Scorecard

Rawalakot Hawks; 179/8 (20 overs)	v	Overseas Warriors; 184/4 (19.1 overs)
Ahmed Shehzad 66 (45); Farhan Shafiq 2/16 (4 overs)		Asad Shafiq 66 (43); Mohammad Amir 2/27 (4 overs)

Overseas Warriors won by 6 wickets
Muzaffarabad Cricket Stadium, Muzaffarabad
Umpires: Aftab Gillani (Pak) and Rashid Riaz (Pak)
Player of the match: Asad Shafiq (Overseas Warriors)

- Overseas Warriors won the toss and elected to bowl.

Match 21
23 August 2022
19:00 (N)
Scorecard

Rawalakot Hawks; 133/9 (18 overs)	v	Kotli Lions; 136/0 (11.1 overs)
Amad Butt 47* (24); Irfanullah Shah 3/35 (4 overs)		Khurram Manzoor 85* (42); Faisal Akram 0/11 (1 over)

Kotli Lions won by 10 wickets
Muzaffarabad Cricket Stadium, Muzaffarabad
Umpires: Saqib Khan (Pak) and Zameer Haider (Pak)
Player of the match: Khurram Manzoor (Kotli Lions)

- Kotli Lions won the toss and elected to field.
- Match reduced to 18 overs per side due to rain.
- Rawalakot Hawks were eliminated as a result of this match.

== Statistics ==
=== Most runs ===
Nat.	Player	Matches	Innings	Runs	Average	HS	100	50
(Pakistan)	Ahmed Shehzad	5	5	164	41.00	74*	0	2
(Pakistan)	Bismillah Khan	5	5	121	40.33	68*	0	1
(Pakistan)	Rohail Nazir	5	3	116	38.67	68	0	1
(England)	Amad Butt	5	3	90	45.00	47*	0	0
(Pakistan)	Baber Khaliq	5	4	50	15.67	16	0	0

Source: Cricinfo

=== Most wickets ===
Nat.	Player	Matches	Overs	Wickets	Average	BBI	4w	5w
(Pakistan)	Zaman Khan	5	18.1	5	32.00	2/37	0	0
(Pakistan)	Faisal Akram	5	15.0	5	28.80	3/41	0	0
(Pakistan)	Mohammad Amir	4	15.1	4	30.75	2/27	0	0
(Pakistan)	Asif Afridi	5	19.0	4	39.25	2/18	0	0
(Pakistan)	Amad Butt	5	16.1	3	45.67	2/24	0	0

Source: Cricinfo
