= Overseas Warriors in 2021 =

1st season of Overseas Warriors in the Kashmir Premier League

Overseas Warriors
2021 season
- Coach: Mushtaq Ahmed
- Captain: Imad Wasim
- KPL 2021: 4th
- Most runs: Nasir Nawaz (209)
- Most wickets: Sohail Khan (8)

Overseas Warriors is a franchise cricket team that represents the Kashmiri diaspora in the Kashmir Premier League. They were coached by Mushtaq Ahmed and captained by Imad Wasim.

== Squad ==
- Players with international caps are listed in **bold**.
- Ages are correct as of 3 July 2021

No.	Name	Nationality	Birth date	Category	Batting style	Bowling style	Year signed	Notes
Batsmen
4	**Herschelle Gibbs**	South Africa	23 February 1974 (aged 47)	Overseas	Right-handed	Right-arm medium	2021	Overseas
12	**Haider Ali**	Pakistan	2 October 2000 (aged 20)	Platinum	Right-handed		2021	
18	Naveed Malik	Pakistan	18 March 1995 (aged 26)	Emerging	Right-handed	Right-arm medium-fast	2021	
42	**Khurram Manzoor**	Pakistan	10 June 1986 (aged 35)		Right-handed	Right-arm off spin	2021	Post-draft signing
81	Nasir Nawaz	Pakistan	5 October 1998 (aged 22)	Silver	Right-handed		2021	
99	Uthman Ali Khan	England		Emerging	Left-handed		2021	
All-rounders
9	**Imad Wasim**	Pakistan	18 December 1988 (aged 32)	Icon	Left-handed	Slow left-arm orthodox	2021	Captain
23	Agha Salman	Pakistan	23 November 1993 (aged 27)	Gold	Right-handed	Right-arm off break	2021	Post-draft signing.
98	Kamran Ghulam	Pakistan	10 October 1995 (aged 25)	Gold	Right-handed	Slow left-arm orthodox	2021	Replacement pick.
N/A	**Hammad Azam**	Pakistan	16 March 1991 (aged 30)	Silver	Right-handed	Right-arm fast-medium	2021	
N/A	**Haris Sohail**	Pakistan	9 January 1989 (aged 32)	Gold	Left-handed	Slow left-arm orthodox	2021	
N/A	Qasim Akram	Pakistan	1 December 2002 (aged 18)	Silver	Right-handed	Right-arm off break	2021	
N/A	Rashid Naseer	Pakistan	4 March 1986 (aged 35)	Emerging	Left-handed	Left-arm unorthodox spin	2021	
Wicket-keepers
63	Mohammad Haris	Pakistan	30 March 2001 (aged 20)	Silver	Right-handed	Right-arm off break	2021	Post-draft signing.
77	**Azam Khan**	Pakistan	10 August 1998 (aged 22)	Diamond	Right-handed		2021	
N/A	Raza-ul-Mustafa	Pakistan	27 December 2003 (aged 17)	Emerging	Right-handed		2021	
Bowlers
14	**Sohail Khan**	Pakistan	6 March 1984 (aged 37)	Diamond	Right-handed	Right-arm fast	2021	
55	Abbas Afridi	Pakistan	5 April 2001 (aged 20)	Silver	Right-handed	Right-arm medium-fast	2021	
66	Faizan Saleem	Pakistan		Emerging	Right-handed	Right-arm medium	2021	Post-draft signing
70	**Muhammad Musa**	Pakistan	28 August 2000 (aged 20)	Gold	Right-handed	Right-arm medium-fast	2021	
N/A	Waleed Ahmed	Pakistan	4 December 1992 (aged 28)	Emerging	Right-handed	Right-arm off break	2021	

== Season standings ==
=== Points table ===
Pos	Team	Pld	W	L	NR	Pts	NRR
1	Rawalakot Hawks (C)	5	3	1	1	7	0.228
2	Muzaffarabad Tigers (R)	5	3	2	0	6	0.530
3	Mirpur Royals (3rd)	5	3	2	0	6	−0.323
4	Overseas Warriors (4th)	5	2	3	0	4	−0.032
5	Bagh Stallions	5	2	3	0	4	−0.201
6	Kotli Lions	5	1	3	1	3	−0.107

Source: ESPNcricinfo
- Top 4 teams qualified for the playoffs
- Advanced to Qualifier
- Advanced to Eliminator 1

Notes:

- C = Champions;
- R = Runner-up;
- (x) = Position at the end of the tournament;

== League fixtures and results ==
Match 3
7 August 2021
19:30 (N)
Scorecard

Overseas Warriors; 153/8 (20 overs)	v	Muzaffarabad Tigers; 156/3 (17.2 overs)
Imad Wasim 34 (30); Usama Mir 3/18 (4 overs)		Sohail Akhtar 58* (24); Kamran Ghulam 2/32 (4 overs)

Muzaffarabad Tigers won by 7 wickets
Muzaffarabad Cricket Stadium, Muzaffarabad
Umpires: Imtiaz Iqbal (Pak) and Rashid Riaz (Pak)
Player of the match: Usama Mir (Muzaffarabad Tigers)

- Overseas Warriors won the toss and elected to bat.

Match 6
9 August 2021
14:00
Scorecard

Overseas Warriors; 145/6 (20 overs)	v	Mirpur Royals; 146/5 (18.1 overs)
Kamran Ghulam 47 (35); Salman Irshad 3/25 (4 overs)		Mukhtar Ahmed 45 (40); Muhammad Musa 3/27 (4 overs)

Mirpur Royals won by 5 wickets
Muzaffarabad Cricket Stadium, Muzaffarabad
Umpires: Ahsan Raza (Pak) and Ghaffar Kazmi (Pak)
Player of the match: Salman Irshad (Mirpur Royals)

- Overseas Warriors won the toss and elected to bat

Match 9
10 August 2021
19:30 (N)
Scorecard

Bagh Stallions; 186/7 (20 overs)	v	Overseas Warriors; 190/5 (19.2 overs)
Shan Masood 73 (45); Abbas Afridi 2/44 (4 overs)		Haider Ali 91 (57); Aamer Yamin 2/31 (4 overs)

Overseas Warriors won by 5 wickets
Muzaffarabad Cricket Stadium, Muzaffarabad
Umpires: Faisal Afridi (Pak) and Shozab Raza (Pak)
Player of the match: Haider Ali (Overseas Warriors)

- Bagh Stallions won the toss and elected to bat

Match 13
12 August 2021
15:30 (N)
Scorecard

Rawalakot Hawks; 145/9 (20 overs)	v	Overseas Warriors; 133/3 (13.1 overs)
Umar Amin 55 (42); Abbas Afridi 5/18 (4 overs)		Nasir Nawaz 56 (36); Asif Afridi 2/29 (4 overs)

Overseas Warriors won by 7 wickets (DLS method)
Muzaffarabad Cricket Stadium, Muzaffarabad
Umpires: Aleem Dar (Pak) and Majid Hussain (Pak)
Player of the match: Nasir Nawaz (Overseas Warriors)

- Overseas Warriors won the toss and elected to field
- Target reduced to 133 from 18 overs
- Kotli Lions were eliminated as a result of this match.

Match 14
13 August 2021
10:30
Scorecard

Overseas Warriors; 211/6 (20 overs)	v	Kotli Lions; 215/2 (19 overs)
Nasir Nawaz 66 (44); Khurram Shahzad 3/39 (4 overs)		Kamran Akmal 60 (35); Faizan Saleem 1/15 (2 overs)

Kotli Lions won by 8 wickets
Muzaffarabad Cricket Stadium, Muzaffarabad
Player of the match: Kamran Akmal (Kotli Lions)

- Kotli Lions won the toss and elected to field

== Playoffs ==
=== Eliminator 1 ===
Match 17
15 August 2021
16:00 (N)
Scorecard

Overseas Warriors; 160/9 (20 overs)	v	Mirpur Royals; 162/6 (18.4 overs)
Agha Salman 59 (26); Shadab Majeed 4/45 (4 overs)		Sharjeel Khan 30 (17); Sohail Khan 2/23 (4 overs)

Mirpur Royals won by 4 wickets
Muzaffarabad Cricket Stadium, Muzaffarabad
Umpires: Aleem Dar (Pak) and Rashid Riaz (Pak)
Player of the match: Shadab Majeed (Mirpur Royals)

- Mirpur Royals won the toss and elected to field
- As a result of this match Mirpur Royals advanced to eliminator 2.
- As a result of this match Overseas Warriors were eliminated from the competition.

== Statistics ==
=== Most runs ===
Player	Matches	Runs	
	Nasir Nawaz	6	209
	Haider Ali	5	189
	Azam Khan	6	123
	Kamran Ghulam	6	110
	Agha Salman	5	93

- Source: Score360

=== Most wickets ===
Player	Matches	Wickets	
	Sohail Khan	6	8
	Abbas Afridi	5	7
	Muhammad Musa	6	6
	Agha Salman	5	3
	Faizan Saleem	6	3

- Source: Score 360
