= Mirpur Royals in 2021 =

2nd season of Mirpur Royals in the Kashmir Premier League

Mirpur Royals
2021 season
- Coach: Inzamam-ul-Haq
- Captain: Shoaib Malik
- KPL 2021: 3rd
- Most runs: Sharjeel Khan (296)
- Most wickets: Salman Irshad (16)

Mirpur Royals is a franchise cricket team that represents Mirpur, Azad Kashmir in the Kashmir Premier League. They were coached by Inzamam-ul-Haq and captained by Shoaib Malik.

== Squad ==
- Players with international caps are listed in **bold**.
- Ages are correct as of 3 July 2021

No.	Name	Nationality	Birth date	Category	Batting style	Bowling style	Year signed	Notes
Batsmen
9	Ibtesam-ul-Haq	Pakistan	1 February 2000 (aged 21)	Emerging	Left-handed		2021	
24	**Mukhtar Ahmed**	Pakistan	20 December 1992 (aged 28)	Silver	Right-handed	leg break	2021	
98	**Sharjeel Khan**	Pakistan	14 August 1989 (aged 31)	Platinum	Left-handed	Right-arm leg spin	2021	
N/A	Ammad Alam	Pakistan	3 October 1998 (aged 22)	Emerging	Right-handed		2021	
N/A	**Owais Shah**	England	22 October 1978 (aged 42)	Overseas	Right-handed	Right-arm off spin	2021	Overseas; Pulled out of the tournament
All-rounders
11	Mohammad Taha	Pakistan	5 October 2000 (aged 20)	Emerging	Left-handed	Left-arm orthodox spin	2021	
18	**Shoaib Malik**	Pakistan	1 February 1982 (aged 39)	Icon	Right-handed	Right-arm off spin	2021	Captain
37	Amad Butt	Pakistan	10 June 1995 (aged 26)	Gold	Right-handed	Right-arm fast	2021	
65	Kashif Bhatti	Pakistan	25 July 1986 (aged 34)	Silver	Right-handed	Left-arm orthodox spin	2021	Replacement pick
72	**Khushdil Shah**	Pakistan	7 February 1995 (aged 26)	Diamond	Left-handed	Right-arm fast-medium	2021	
77	Adil Amin	Pakistan	13 December 1990 (aged 30)	Silver	Right-handed	Right-arm off break	2021	Post-draft signing
Wicket-keepers
61	Muhammad Akhlaq	Pakistan	12 November 1992 (aged 28)	Silver	Right-handed	Right-arm medium-fast	2021	
Bowlers
1	Sameen Gul	Pakistan	4 February 1999 (aged 22)	Gold	Right-handed	Right-arm medium	2021	Replacement pick
7	Abrar Ahmed	Pakistan	16 October 1998 (aged 22)	Silver	Left-handed	Left-arm leg break	2021	
26	Danyal Allah Ditta	Pakistan	2 July 1995 (aged 26)	Emerging	Left-handed	Left-arm slow left-arm orthodox	2021	
27	**Mohammad Irfan**	Pakistan	6 June 1982 (aged 39)	Diamond	Right-handed	Right-arm fast	2021	
38	Shadab Majeed	Pakistan	7 June 1997 (aged 24)	Emerging	Right-handed	Right-arm medium fast	2021	
48	Hassan Khan	Pakistan	16 October 1998 (aged 22)	Silver	Right-handed	Left-arm orthodox	2021	Post-draft signing
99	Salman Irshad	Pakistan	3 December 1995 (aged 25)	Gold	Right-handed	Right-arm fast	2021	

== Season standings ==
=== Points table ===
Pos	Team	Pld	W	L	NR	Pts	NRR
1	Rawalakot Hawks (C)	5	3	1	1	7	0.228
2	Muzaffarabad Tigers (R)	5	3	2	0	6	0.530
3	Mirpur Royals (3rd)	5	3	2	0	6	−0.323
4	Overseas Warriors (4th)	5	2	3	0	4	−0.032
5	Bagh Stallions	5	2	3	0	4	−0.201
6	Kotli Lions	5	1	3	1	3	−0.107

Source: ESPNcricinfo
- Top 4 teams qualified for the playoffs
- Advanced to Qualifier
- Advanced to Eliminator 1

Notes:

- C = Champions;
- R = Runner-up;
- (x) = Position at the end of the tournament;

== League fixtures and results ==
Match 1
6 August 2021
20:30 (N)
Scorecard

Rawalakot Hawks; 194/6 (20 overs)	v	Mirpur Royals; 151/8 (20 overs)
Ahmed Shehzad 69 (42); Amad Butt 3/20 (4 overs)		Shoaib Malik 77 (51); Shahid Afridi 2/27 (4 overs)

Rawalakot Hawks won by 43 runs
Muzaffarabad Cricket Stadium, Muzaffarabad
Umpires: Ahsan Raza (Pak) and Asif Yaqoob (Pak)
Player of the match: Bismillah Khan (Rawalakot Hawks)

- Mirpur Royals won the toss and elected to field.

Match 4
8 August 2021
14:00
Scorecard

Bagh Stallions; 211/6 (20 overs)	v	Mirpur Royals; 196/8 (20 overs)
Shan Masood 78 (45); Salman Irshad 3/47 (4 overs)		Muhammad Akhlaq 68 (39); Mohammad Imran 2/33 (4 overs)

Bagh Stallions won by 15 runs
Muzaffarabad Cricket Stadium, Muzaffarabad
Umpires: Ahmed Shahab (Pak) and Shozab Raza (Pak)
Player of the match: Shan Masood (Bagh Stallions)

- Mirpur Royals won the toss and elected to field.

Match 6
9 August 2021
14:00
Scorecard

Overseas Warriors; 145/6 (20 overs)	v	Mirpur Royals; 146/5 (18.1 overs)
Kamran Ghulam 47 (35); Salman Irshad 3/25 (4 overs)		Mukhtar Ahmed 45 (40); Muhammad Musa 3/27 (4 overs)

Mirpur Royals won by 5 wickets
Muzaffarabad Cricket Stadium, Muzaffarabad
Umpires: Ahsan Raza (Pak) and Ghaffar Kazmi (Pak)
Player of the match: Salman Irshad (Mirpur Royals)

- Overseas Warriors won the toss and elected to bat

Match 11
11 August 2021
19:30 (N)
Scorecard

Mirpur Royals; 211/6 (20 overs)	v	Kotli Lions; 211/8 (20 overs)
Mukhtar Ahmed 61 (38); Mujtaba Ghayyas 2/23 (3 overs)		Ahsan Ali 99 (47); Salman Irshad 3/39 (4 overs)

Match Tied (Mirpur Royals won the Super Over)
Muzaffarabad Cricket Stadium, Muzaffarabad
Umpires: Ahmed Shahab (Pak) and Faisal Afridi (Pak)
Player of the match: Ahsan Ali (Kotli Lions)

- Kotli Lions won the toss and elected to field
- Super Over: Kotli Lions 2 all out, Mirpur Royals 4/0.

Match 15
13 August 2021
15:30 (N)
Scorecard

Muzaffarabad Tigers; 227/6 (20 overs)	v	Mirpur Royals; 231/5 (19.4 overs)
Mohammad Hafeez 110 (55); Salman Irshad 2/27 (4 overs)		Khushdil Shah 56* (22); Arsalan Arif 1/15 (2 overs)

Mirpur Royals won by 5 wickets
Muzaffarabad Cricket Stadium, Muzaffarabad
Umpires: Aleem Dar (Pak) and Faisal Afridi
Player of the match: Mohammad Hafeez (Muzaffarabad Tigers)

- Muzaffarabad Tigers won the toss and elected to field
- Mohammad Hafeez scored his first century in the KPL

== Playoffs ==
=== Eliminator 1 ===
Match 17
15 August 2021
16:00 (N)
Scorecard

Overseas Warriors; 160/9 (20 overs)	v	Mirpur Royals; 162/6 (18.4 overs)
Agha Salman 59 (26); Shadab Majeed 4/45 (4 overs)		Sharjeel Khan 30 (17); Sohail Khan 2/23 (4 overs)

Mirpur Royals won by 4 wickets
Muzaffarabad Cricket Stadium, Muzaffarabad
Umpires: Aleem Dar (Pak) and Rashid Riaz (Pak)
Player of the match: Shadab Majeed (Mirpur Royals)

- Mirpur Royals won the toss and elected to field
- As a result of this match Mirpur Royals advanced to eliminator 2.
- As a result of this match Overseas Warriors were eliminated from the competition.

=== Eliminator 2 ===
Match 18
16 August 2021
16:00 (N)
Scorecard

Mirpur Royals; 236/4 (20 overs)	v	Rawalakot Hawks; 237/6 (19.4 overs)
Sharjeel Khan 141 (63); Zaman Khan 2/18 (4 overs)		Kashif Ali 114* (51); Amad Butt 3/40 (4 overs)

Rawalakot Hawks won by 4 wickets
Muzaffarabad Cricket Stadium, Muzaffarabad
Umpires: Aleem Dar (Pak) and Asif Yaqoob (Pak)
Player of the match: Kashif Ali (Rawalakot Hawks)

- Rawalakot Hawks won the toss and elected to field
- As a result of this match Rawalakot Hawks advanced to the final.
- As a result of this match Mirpur Royals were eliminated from the competition.
- Sharjeel Khan and Kashif Ali scored their first centuries in the KPL

== Statistics ==
=== Most runs ===
Nat.	Player	Matches	Innings	Runs	Average	HS	100	50
(Pakistan)	Sharjeel Khan	6	6	296	49.33	141	1	1
(Pakistan)	Shoaib Malik	7	7	240	48.00	77	0	1
(Pakistan)	Muhammad Akhlaq	7	7	211	30.14	68	0	1
(Pakistan)	Mukhtar Ahmed	7	7	194	27.71	61	0	1
(Pakistan)	Khushdil Shah	7	7	156	31.20	56*	0	1

Source: Score360

=== Most wickets ===
Nat.	Player	Matches	Overs	Wickets	Average	BBI	4w	5w
(Pakistan)	Salman Irshad	7	28.0	16	15.18	3/25	0	0
(Pakistan)	Amad Butt	7	25.0	11	19.54	3/20	0	0
(Pakistan)	Shadab Majeed	6	19.4	8	29.25	4/45	1	0
(Pakistan)	Sameen Gul	5	20.0	5	35.40	2/29	0	0
(Pakistan)	Hassan Khan	3	2.0	1	24.00	1/5	0	0

Source: Score360
