= 2022 Kashmir Premier League (Pakistan) =

2nd season of the Kashmir Premier League

- Dates: 13 August – 26 August
- Administrator: Pakistan Cricket Board
- Cricket format: 20-over
- Tournament format(s): Single round-robin and playoffs
- Host: Azad Kashmir
- Champions: Mirpur Royals (1st title)
- Runners-up: Bagh Stallions
- Participants: 7
- Matches: 25
- Player of the series: Shoaib Malik (182 runs and 1 wicket)
- Most runs: Sharjeel Khan (273)
- Most wickets: Sohail Khan (9); Arshad Iqbal (9)
- Official website: kpl20.com

The 2022 Kashmir Premier League (also known as 2022 KPL or, for sponsorship reasons, Kingdom Valley KPL 2022) was the second season of the Kashmir Premier League, a cricket league which was established by the Pakistan Cricket Board (PCB) in Azad Kashmir in 2021.

This season saw the expansion of the KPL from 6 teams to 7 teams. After the end of the first edition of the KPL, it was announced that there would be a seventh team added for the 2022 edition. An eighth franchise was also established for Gilgit-Baltistan but the team was removed from the tournament for unknown reasons. The KPL management held talks to hold the playoffs and final of the 2022 KPL in England but were unsuccessful. The tournament was originally scheduled to take place from 1 August to 14 August but it was rescheduled out of respect for Muharram. The draft was held on 21 July 2022. Rawalakot Hawks were the defending champions until they were knocked out in the group stage.

== Franchises ==
Cities represented by KPL teams

Team	Owner	Place	Founded	Captain	Coach
Bagh Stallions	Tauqir Sultan Awan	Bagh, played all matches in Muzaffarabad	2021	Umar Amin	Abdul Rehman
Jammu Janbaz	Ghulam Hussain Shahid	Jammu, played all matches in Muzaffarabad	2022	Faheem Ashraf	Riaz Afridi
Kotli Lions	~~Faisal Nadeem, Khalid Zia and Nasir Yousuf~~ (Note: Kotli Lions and Overseas Warriors’ managements were terminated after they both failed to pay outstanding payments.)	Kotli, played all matches in Muzaffarabad	2021	Khurram Manzoor	~~Saeed Azad~~ (Note: Saeed Azad left Kotli Lions during the tournament and was replaced by Mushtaq Ahmed.); Mushtaq Ahmed
Mirpur Royals	Abdul Wajid	Mirpur, played all matches in Muzaffarabad	2021	Shoaib Malik	Abdul Razzaq
Muzaffarabad Tigers	Arshad Khan Tanoli	Muzaffarabad	2021	Mohammad Hafeez	Misbah-ul-Haq
Overseas Warriors	~~Jahanzeb Alam~~; Zeeshan Altaf Lohya	Kashmiri diaspora, played all matches in Muzaffarabad	2021	Asad Shafiq	Azam Khan
Rawalakot Hawks	Jan Wali Shaheen	Rawalakot, played all matches in Muzaffarabad	2021	Ahmed Shehzad	Arshad Khan

== Squads ==
Squads

Bagh Stallions	Jammu Janbaz	Kotli Lions	Mirpur Royals	Muzaffarabad Tigers	Overseas Warriors	Rawalakot Hawks
Umar Amin (c); Rumman Raees (vc); Kamran Akmal; Sohaib Maqsood; Aamer Yamin; Kashif Bhatti; Mohammad Imran; Aamer Jamal; Mohammad Sarwar; Sharoon Siraj; Maaz Khan; Sajjad Ali; Amir Shehzad; Arsalan Arif; Awais Akram; Danyal Allah Ditta; Hasan Raza; Abdul Bangalzai; Ali Majid	Faheem Ashraf (c); Sharjeel Khan; Shahid Afridi; Sahibzada Farhan; Umar Akmal; Akif Javed; Usama Mir; Ahmed Khan; Imran Khan; Shahzaib; Umar Siddiq; Hamza Shah Afridi; Samiullah Afridi; Faisal Altaf; Mehran Mumtaz; Mohammad Shehzad; Najam Naseer Kiyani; Naqash Basharat; Akash Afridi; Azaz Afridi	Khurram Manzoor (c); Danish Aziz; Sarfaraz Ahmed; Ahsan Ali; Khurram Shahzad; Irfanullah Shah; Khalid Usman; Hanif Azad; Hasan Mohsin; Hassan Khan; Mushtaq Kalhoro; Imran Shah; Irfan Ali Qasmi; Basit Ali; Mujtaba Ghayas; Nadeem Khalil; Naveed Malik; Zayyan Khan; Abdul Rehman; Omair Yousuf; Mirwais Khan	Shoaib Malik (c); Haris Sohail; Imad Wasim; Ali Imran; Salman Irshad; Abrar Ahmed; Muhammad Akhlaq; Hamza Arshad; Kashif Ali; Zaid Alam; Zubair Lodhi; Ali Razzaq; Hassan Nawaz; Faizan Saleem; Shadab Majeed; Shan Khan; Sufyan Moqeem; Umar Hayat; Raza-ul-Mustafa; Yasir Shah; Izhar-ul-Haq; Arsalan Mehzood	Mohammad Hafeez (c); Iftikhar Ahmed; Sohail Tanvir; Anwar Ali; Haseebullah Khan; Zeeshan Ashraf; Arshad Iqbal; Ahmed Safi Abdullah; Mir Hamza; Salman Fayyaz; Taimoor Sultan; Aaqib Liaquat; Amir Khan; Aqib Ilyas; Inzamam-ul-Haq; Osama Fazil; Saad Bin Zafar; Usman Maroof; Ahmed Daniyal; Ameer Hamza	Asad Shafiq (c); Azam Khan; Kamran Ghulam; Mohammad Imran; Sohail Khan; Saif Badar; Umaid Asif; Adil Amin; Ali Shafiq; Bilal Asif; Muhammad Shehzad; Khawaja Mohammad; Umer Zeeshan; Farhan Shafiq; Hanan Ahmed; Malik Nisar; Hashim Ali; Saad Asif; Sameer Khan; Shayan Raza; Nosherwan Ibrahim	Ahmed Shehzad (c); Mohammad Amir; Hussain Talat; Asif Afridi; Zaman Khan; Amad Butt; Bismillah Khan; Ammad Alam; Faisal Akram; Musadiq Ahmed; Zeeshan Malik; Ihsanullah; Saeedullah; ~~Atif Sheikh~~; ~~Kashif Ali~~; Raja Farhan Khan; ~~Saif Zaib~~; ~~Zain-ul-Hassan~~; Babar Khaliq; Khawaja Muhammad Bilal; Rohaan Qadri; Rohail Nazir; Sohail Akhtar; Sameen Gul

== Marketing ==
The 2022 KPL was promoted on social media using the hashtag #KheloAazadiSe, similar to its previous edition. Shahid Afridi was signed as brand ambassador for the 2022 KPL and the official singers were Sahir Ali Bagga and Aima Baig.

=== Anthem ===
The official anthem of the 2022 KPL, “Khelo Aazadi Se” was released on 29 July 2022 and it was sung by Sahir Ali Bagga and Aima Baig.

=== Media personnels ===
The KPL announced the media personnels on Twitter on 12 August 2022.

==== Commentary Panel ====
- Aamir Sohail
- Daryll Cullinan
- HD Ackerman
- Marina Iqbal
- Nick Compton
- Waqar Younis

==== Presenters ====
- Hijab Zahid
- Sikander Bakht

== Venue ==
The whole tournament took place in Muzaffarabad, Azad Kashmir.

Muzaffarabad
Muzaffarabad Cricket Stadium
Capacity: 10,000
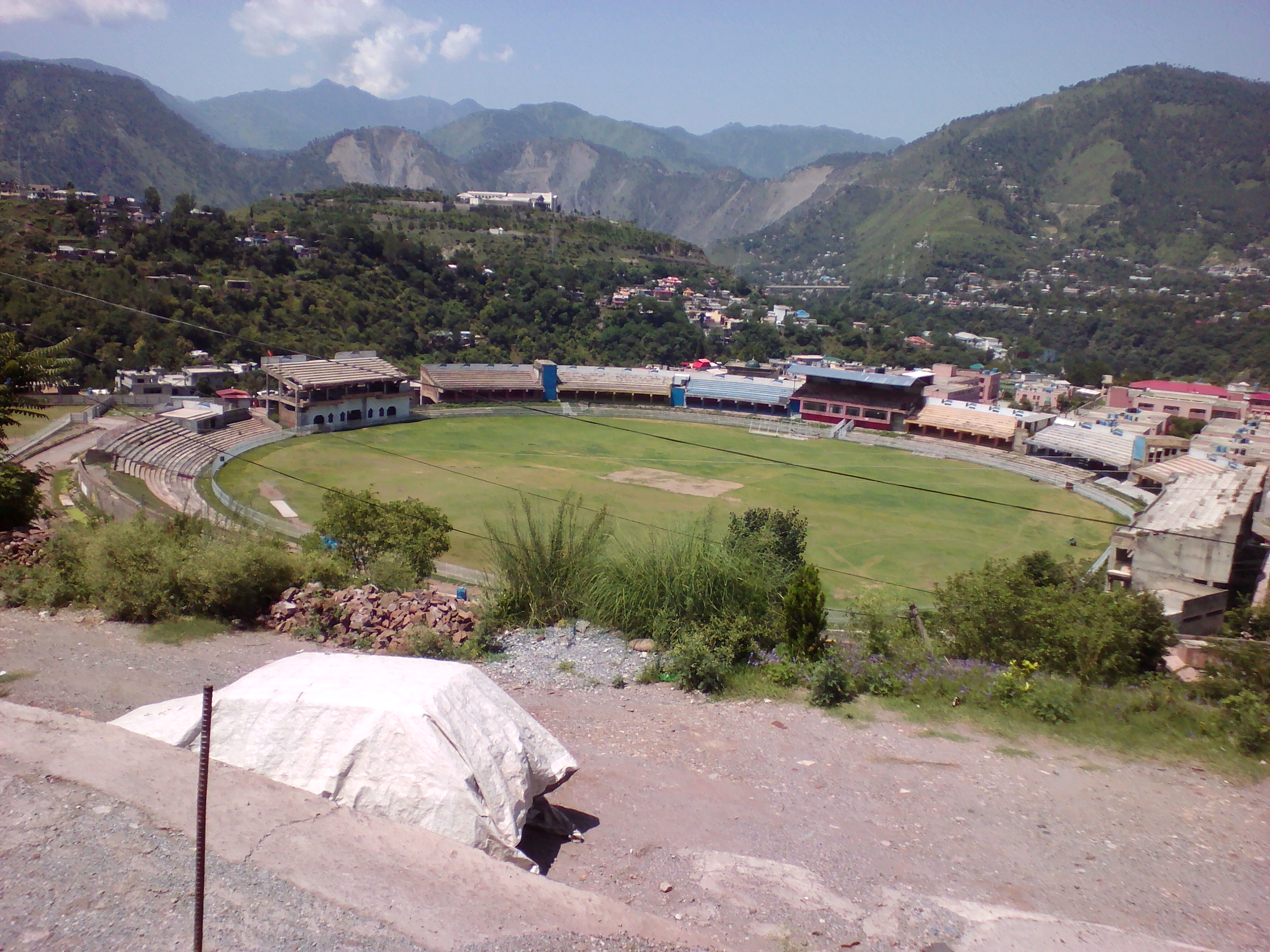

== Umpires ==
- Aleem Dar
- Ahsan Raza
- Asif Yaqoob
- Rashid Riaz
- Faisal Afridi
- Shozab Raza
- Waleed Yaqub
- Imtiaz Iqbal
- Imran Javed
- Saqib Khan
- Ghaffar Kazmi
- Nasir Hussain
- Sajid Afridi
- Aaley Haider
- Mohammad Asif
- Zameer Haider
- Qaiser Waheed
- Aftab Gillani
- Ahmed Shahab
- Majid Hussain

== League stage ==
=== Points table ===
Pos	Team	Pld	W	L	NR	Pts	NRR
1	Mirpur Royals (C)	6	4	2	0	8	0.409
2	Bagh Stallions (R)	6	3	2	1	7	0.449
3	Overseas Warriors (3rd)	6	3	2	1	7	0.207
4	Kotli Lions (4th)	6	2	3	1	5	0.457
5	Jammu Janbaz	6	2	3	1	5	−0.322
6	Rawalakot Hawks	6	2	3	1	5	−0.613
7	Muzaffarabad Tigers	6	2	3	1	5	−0.699

Source: Cricinfo
- Top 4 teams qualified for the playoffs
- Advanced to Qualifier
- Advanced to Eliminator 1

Notes:

- C = Champions;
- R = Runner-up;
- (x) = Position at the end of the tournament;

=== Summary ===
Against Team	Bagh Stallions	Jammu Janbaz	Kotli Lions	Mirpur Royals	Muzaffarabad Tigers	Overseas Warriors	Rawalakot Hawks
Bagh Stallions		Lost by 4 runs	Won by 6 wickets	Won by 8 runs	Lost by 7 wickets	Won by 15 runs	Match Abandoned
Jammu Janbaz			Lost by 4 wickets	Lost by 12 runs	Match Abandoned	Won by 5 wickets	Lost by 11 runs
Kotli Lions				Lost by 6 wickets	Lost by 16 runs	Match Abandoned	Won by 10 wickets
Mirpur Royals					Won by 6 wickets	Lost by 15 runs	Won by 3 wickets
Muzaffarabad Tigers						Lost by 9 runs	Lost by 10 wickets
Overseas Warriors							Won by 6 wickets
Rawalakot Hawks							

=== League progression ===
League progression
Team	Group matches						Playoffs		
Team	1	2	3	4	5	6	Q1/E	Q2	F
Bagh Stallions	0	2	3	5	5	7	L	W	L
Jammu Janbaz	0	2	3	3	3	5			
Kotli Lions	0	1	3	3	3	5	L		
Mirpur Royals	2	2	2	4	6	8	W		W
Muzaffarabad Tigers	2	2	3	3	5	5			
Overseas Warriors	0	1	3	5	7	7	W	L	
Rawalakot Hawks	2	4	5	5	5	5			

Win	Loss	No result

- Note: The total points at the end of each group match are listed.
- Note: Click on the points (group matches) or W/L (playoffs) to see the match summary.

=== Fixtures ===
The schedule for the tournament was announced on 1 August 2022.

Match 1
13 August 2022
19:00 (N)
Scorecard

Jammu Janbaz; 178/4 (20 overs)	v	Rawalakot Hawks; 50/1 (5.1 overs)
Sharjeel Khan 89 (51); Mohammad Amir 1/28 (4 overs)		Bismillah Khan 16* (10); Imran Khan 1/15 (2 overs)

Rawalakot Hawks won by 11 runs (DLS method)
Muzaffarabad Cricket Stadium, Muzaffarabad
Umpires: Asif Yaqoob (Pak) and Shozab Raza (Pak)
Player of the match: Sharjeel Khan (Jammu Janbaz)

- Rawalakot Hawks won the toss and elected to field.
- Match abandoned due to wet outfield.

Match 2
14 August 2022
14:00
Scorecard

Kotli Lions; 151/6 (20 overs)	v	Mirpur Royals; 152/4 (19.4 overs)
Danish Aziz 52* (43); Zubair Lodhi 2/43 (4 overs)		Ali Imran 84 (57); Khurram Shahzad 3/27 (4 overs)

Mirpur Royals won by 6 wickets
Muzaffarabad Cricket Stadium, Muzaffarabad
Umpires: Imran Javed (Pak) and Shozab Raza (Pak)
Player of the match: Ali Imran (Mirpur Royals)

- Mirpur Royals won the toss and elected to field.

Match 3
14 August 2022
19:00 (N)
Scorecard

Bagh Stallions; 52/4 (5 overs)	v	Muzaffarabad Tigers; 53/3 (4.4 overs)
Mohammad Sarwar 25* (15); Mir Hamza 2/17 (2 overs); Arshad Iqbal 2/17 (2 overs)		Iftikhar Ahmed 24* (8); Ali Majid 2/15 (1.4 overs)

Muzaffarabad Tigers won by 7 wickets
Muzaffarabad Cricket Stadium, Muzaffarabad
Umpires: Ahsan Raza (Pak) and Tariq Rasheed (Pak)
Player of the match: Mir Hamza (Muzaffarabad Tigers)

- Muzaffarabad Tigers won the toss and elected to field.
- Match reduced to 5 overs per side due to rain.

Match 4
15 August 2022
14:00
Scorecard

Overseas Warriors; 101/3 (8 overs)	v	Jammu Janbaz; 105/5 (7.5 overs)
Mohammad Imran 29 (12); Usama Mir 2/16 (2 overs)		Shahzaib 40 (18); Sohail Khan 3/14 (2 overs)

Jammu Janbaz won by 5 wickets
Muzaffarabad Cricket Stadium, Muzaffarabad
Umpires: Aaley Haider (Pak) and Ahsan Raza (Pak)
Player of the match: Shahzaib (Jammu Janbaz)

- Jammu Janbaz won the toss and elected to field.
- Match reduced to 8 overs per side due to rain.
- Sohail Khan took his first hat-trick in the KPL.

Match 5
15 August 2022
19:00 (N)
Scorecard

Bagh Stallions; 189/5 (20 overs)	v	Mirpur Royals; 181/4 (20 overs)
Sohaib Maqsood 72* (53); Abrar Ahmed 2/24 (4 overs)		Ali Imran 47 (28); Aamer Jamal 2/39 (4 overs)

Bagh Stallions won by 8 runs
Muzaffarabad Cricket Stadium, Muzaffarabad
Umpires: Ghaffar Kazmi (Pak) and Imran Javed (Pak)
Player of the match: Sohaib Maqsood (Bagh Stallions)

- Mirpur Royals won the toss and elected to field.

Match 6
16 August 2022
14:00
Scorecard

Muzaffarabad Tigers; 154/8 (20 overs)	v	Rawalakot Hawks; 155/0 (17.2 overs)
Iftikhar Ahmed 43 (33); Amad Butt 2/24 (4 overs)		Ahmed Shehzad 74* (55); Saad Bin Zafar 0/15 (4 overs)

Rawalakot Hawks won by 10 wickets
Muzaffarabad Cricket Stadium, Muzaffarabad
Umpires: Tariq Rasheed (Pak) and Waleed Yaqub (Pak)
Player of the match: Amad Butt (Rawalakot Hawks)

- Rawalakot Hawks won the toss and elected to field.

Match 7
16 August 2022
19:00 (N)
Scorecard

Kotli Lions	v	Overseas Warriors

Match Abandoned
Muzaffarabad Cricket Stadium, Muzaffarabad
Umpires: Aaley Haider (Pak) and Asif Yaqoob (Pak)

Match 8
17 August 2022
14:00
Scorecard

Jammu Janbaz	v	Muzaffarabad Tigers

Match Abandoned
Muzaffarabad Cricket Stadium, Muzaffarabad
Umpires: Ghaffar Kazmi (Pak) and Qaiser Waheed (Pak)

Match 9
17 August 2022
21:00 (N)
Scorecard

Rawalakot Hawks	v	Bagh Stallions

Match Abandoned
Muzaffarabad Cricket Stadium, Muzaffarabad
Umpires: Ahsan Raza (Pak) and Waleed Yaqub (Pak)

Match 10
18 August 2022
14:00
Scorecard

Overseas Warriors; 188/7 (20 overs)	v	Mirpur Royals; 173/8 (20 overs)
Asad Shafiq 112 (60); Abrar Ahmed 2/9 (4 overs)		Hassan Nawaz 56 (32); Sohail Khan 2/36 (4 overs)

Overseas Warriors won by 15 runs
Muzaffarabad Cricket Stadium, Muzaffarabad
Umpires: Aftab Gillani (Pak) and Shozab Raza (Pak)
Player of the match: Asad Shafiq (Overseas Warriors)

- Mirpur Royals won the toss and elected to field.
- Asad Shafiq scored his first century in the KPL.

Match 11
18 August 2022
21:00 (N)
Scorecard

Jammu Janbaz; 162/8 (20 overs)	v	Kotli Lions; 166/6 (19.2 overs)
Sharjeel Khan 81 (48); Hassan Khan 2/11 (3 overs)		Ahsan Ali 53 (36); Mehran Mumtaz 2/29 (4 overs)

Kotli Lions won by 4 wickets
Muzaffarabad Cricket Stadium, Muzaffarabad
Umpires: Ahsan Raza (Pak) and Nasir Hussain (Pak)
Player of the match: Sarfaraz Ahmed (Kotli Lions)

- Kotli Lions won the toss and elected to field.

Match 12
19 August 2022
14:00
Scorecard

Rawalakot Hawks; 156/7 (20 overs)	v	Mirpur Royals; 157/7 (19.1 overs)
Rohail Nazir 68 (59); Imad Wasim 3/27 (4 overs)		Shoaib Malik 33 (19); Faisal Akram 3/41 (4 overs)

Mirpur Royals won by 3 wickets
Muzaffarabad Cricket Stadium, Muzaffarabad
Umpires: Asif Yaqoob (Pak) and Majid Hussain (Pak)
Player of the match: Imad Wasim (Mirpur Royals)

- Mirpur Royals won the toss and elected to field.

Match 13
19 August 2022
19:00 (N)
Scorecard

Overseas Warriors; 147/9 (20 overs)	v	Muzaffarabad Tigers; 138/9 (20 overs)
Saif Badar 57* (40); Arshad Iqbal 3/17 (4 overs)		Ameer Hamza 31 (24); Muhammad Shehzad 2/2 (1 over)

Overseas Warriors won by 9 runs
Muzaffarabad Cricket Stadium, Muzaffarabad
Umpires: Mohammad Asif (Pak) and Nasir Hussain (Pak)
Player of the match: Saif Badar (Overseas Warriors)

- Muzaffarabad Tigers won the toss and elected to field.

Match 14
20 August 2022
14:00
Scorecard

Kotli Lions; 86/4 (9 overs)	v	Bagh Stallions; 88/4 (7.4 overs)
Ahsan Ali 37 (20); Rumman Raees 3/11 (2 overs)		Kamran Akmal 37 (17); Basit Ali 2/19 (2 overs)

Bagh Stallions won by 6 wickets (DLS method)
Muzaffarabad Cricket Stadium, Muzaffarabad
Umpires: Mohammad Asif (Pak) and Mohammad Sajid (Pak)
Player of the match: Rumman Raees (Bagh Stallions)

- Bagh Stallions won the toss and elected to field.
- Match reduced to 9 overs per side due to rain.
- Bagh Stallions were set a revised target of 88 runs.

Match 15
20 August 2022
19:00 (N)
Scorecard

Mirpur Royals; 172/4 (20 overs)	v	Jammu Janbaz; 160/8 (20 overs)
Hassan Nawaz 68 (44); Mehran Mumtaz 1/26 (4 overs)		Shahzaib 40 (38); Ali Imran 2/7 (1 over)

Mirpur Royals won by 12 runs
Muzaffarabad Cricket Stadium, Muzaffarabad
Umpires: Faisal Afridi (Pak) and Rashid Riaz (Pak)
Player of the match: Shoaib Malik (Mirpur Royals)

- Jammu Janbaz won the toss and elected to field.

Match 16
21 August 2022
10:00
Scorecard

Kotli Lions; 156/7 (20 overs)	v	Muzaffarabad Tigers; 149/4 (17.4 overs)
Khurram Manzoor 37 (34); Arshad Iqbal 2/40 (4 overs)		Haseebullah Khan 67 (50); Irfanullah Shah 2/24 (3 overs)

Muzaffarabad Tigers won by 16 runs (DLS method)
Muzaffarabad Cricket Stadium, Muzaffarabad
Umpires: Saqib Khan (Pak) and Zameer Haider (Pak)
Player of the match: Haseebullah Khan (Muzaffarabad Tigers)

- Muzaffarabad Tigers won the toss and elected to field.
- Match abandoned due to wet outfield.

Match 17
21 August 2022
21:00 (N)
Scorecard

Rawalakot Hawks; 179/8 (20 overs)	v	Overseas Warriors; 184/4 (19.1 overs)
Ahmed Shehzad 66 (45); Farhan Shafiq 2/16 (4 overs)		Asad Shafiq 66 (43); Mohammad Amir 2/27 (4 overs)

Overseas Warriors won by 6 wickets
Muzaffarabad Cricket Stadium, Muzaffarabad
Umpires: Aftab Gillani (Pak) and Rashid Riaz (Pak)
Player of the match: Asad Shafiq (Overseas Warriors)

- Overseas Warriors won the toss and elected to field.

Match 18
22 August 2022
14:00
Scorecard

Jammu Janbaz; 169 (19.1 overs)	v	Bagh Stallions; 165/9 (20 overs)
Sharjeel Khan 66 (31); Aamer Jamal 4/40 (4 overs)		Kamran Akmal 51 (31); Ahmed Khan 3/28 (4 overs)

Jammu Janbaz won by 4 runs
Muzaffarabad Cricket Stadium, Muzaffarabad
Umpires: Ahmed Shahab (Pak) and Aleem Dar (Pak)
Player of the match: Sharjeel Khan (Jammu Janbaz)

- Jammu Janbaz won the toss and elected to bat.
- Jammu Janbaz were eliminated as a result of this match.

Match 19
22 August 2022
19:00 (N)
Scorecard

Muzaffarabad Tigers; 135/8 (20 overs)	v	Mirpur Royals; 136/4 (14.3 overs)
Anwar Ali 44 (29); Shadab Majeed 2/13 (3 overs)		Muhammad Akhlaq 50* (34); Arshad Iqbal 2/36 (4 overs)

Mirpur Royals won by 6 wickets
Muzaffarabad Cricket Stadium, Muzaffarabad
Umpires: Imtiaz Iqbal (Pak) and Sajid Afridi (Pak)
Player of the match: Shadab Majeed (Mirpur Royals)

- Mirpur Royals won the toss and elected to field.
- Mirpur Royals qualified for the playoffs as a result of this match.
- Muzaffarabad Tigers were eliminated as a result of this match.

Match 20
23 August 2022
14:00
Scorecard

Overseas Warriors; 127 (19.5 overs)	v	Bagh Stallions; 70/3 (9 overs)
Kamran Ghulam 32 (24); Ali Majid 3/13 (4 overs)		Abdul Bangalzai 30 (20); Sohail Khan 2/14 (2 overs)

Bagh Stallions won by 15 runs (DLS method)
Muzaffarabad Cricket Stadium, Muzaffarabad
Umpires: Ahmed Shahab (Pak) and Imtiaz Iqbal (Pak)
Player of the match: Ali Majid (Bagh Stallions)

- Bagh Stallions won the toss and elected to field.
- Match abandoned due to wet outfield.

Match 21
23 August 2022
19:00 (N)
Scorecard

Rawalakot Hawks; 133/9 (18 overs)	v	Kotli Lions; 136/0 (11.1 overs)
Amad Butt 47* (24); Irfanullah Shah 3/35 (4 overs)		Khurram Manzoor 85* (42); Faisal Akram 0/11 (1 over)

Kotli Lions won by 10 wickets
Muzaffarabad Cricket Stadium, Muzaffarabad
Umpires: Saqib Khan (Pak) and Zameer Haider (Pak)
Player of the match: Khurram Manzoor (Kotli Lions)

- Kotli Lions won the toss and elected to field.
- Match reduced to 18 overs per side due to rain.
- Rawalakot Hawks were eliminated as a result of this match.

== Playoffs ==
Semifinals
24 August — Muzaffarabad
1	Mirpur Royals
2	Bagh Stallions
24 August — Muzaffarabad
3	Overseas Warriors
4	Kotli Lions

Preliminary final
25 August — Muzaffarabad
2	Bagh Stallions
3	Overseas Warriors

Final
26 August — Muzaffarabad
1	Mirpur Royals
2	Bagh Stallions

=== Preliminary ===
==== Qualifier ====
Match 22
24 August 2022
14:00
Scorecard

Mirpur Royals	v	Bagh Stallions

Match Abandoned
Mirpur Royals awarded the match
Muzaffarabad Cricket Stadium, Muzaffarabad
Umpires: Faisal Afridi (Pak) and Rashid Riaz (Pak)

- Mirpur Royals qualified for the Final due to their better position in the points table.

==== Eliminator 1 ====
Match 23
24 August 2022
19:00 (N)
Scorecard

Overseas Warriors	v	Kotli Lions

Match Abandoned
Overseas Warriors awarded the match
Muzaffarabad Cricket Stadium, Muzaffarabad

- Overseas Warriors qualified for Eliminator 2 due to their better position in the points table.
- As a result of this match Kotli Lions were knocked out of the tournament.

==== Eliminator 2 ====
Match 24
25 August 2022
19:00 (N)
Scorecard

Bagh Stallions	v	Overseas Warriors

Match Abandoned
Bagh Stallions awarded the match
Muzaffarabad Cricket Stadium, Muzaffarabad

- Bagh Stallions qualified for the Final due to their better position in the points table.
- As a result of this match Overseas Warriors were knocked out of the tournament.

=== Final ===
Match 25
26 August 2022
19:00 (N)
Scorecard

Mirpur Royals	v	Bagh Stallions

Match Abandoned
Mirpur Royals declared champions
Muzaffarabad Cricket Stadium, Muzaffarabad
Umpires: Aleem Dar (Pak) and Rashid Riaz (Pak)

- Mirpur Royals were declared the winners due to their better position in the points table.

== Statistics ==
=== Most runs ===
Player	Team	Matches	Runs	High score
Sharjeel Khan	Jammu Janbaz	5	273	89
Hassan Nawaz	Mirpur Royals	6	241	68
Asad Shafiq	Overseas Warriors	5	221	112
Shoaib Malik	Mirpur Royals	6	182	48
Ahsan Ali	Kotli Lions	5	168	53

- Source: Cricinfo

=== Most wickets ===
Player	Team	Matches	Wickets	Best bowling
Sohail Khan	Overseas Warriors	5	9	3/14
Arshad Iqbal	Muzaffarabad Tigers	5	9	3/17
Rumman Raees	Bagh Stallions	5	8	3/11
Abrar Ahmed	Mirpur Royals	5	7	2/19
Shadab Majeed	Mirpur Royals	5	7	2/13

- Source: Cricinfo

== Awards ==
=== Individual awards ===
Name	Team	Award
Shoaib Malik	Mirpur Royals	Player of the Tournament
Sharjeel Khan	Jammu Janbaz	Best Batsman of the tournament
Abrar Ahmed	Mirpur Royals	Best Bowler of the tournament
Azam Khan	Overseas Warriors	Best Wicket-keeper of the tournament
Hasan Mohsin	Kotli Lions	Best Fielder of the tournament
Hassan Nawaz	Mirpur Royals	Emerging Player of the tournament
Shadab Majeed	Mirpur Royals	Best Kashmiri Player of the tournament

=== Dream Team ===
Players
- Sharjeel Khan
- Ahmed Shehzad
- Hassan Nawaz
- Asad Shafiq
- Shoaib Malik (c)
- Sarfaraz Ahmed (wk)
- Imad Wasim
- Ali Majid
- Shadab Majeed
- Arshad Iqbal
- Sohail Khan
- Rumman Raees (12th man)

== Controversies ==
Four franchises of the KPL (Bagh Stallions, Mirpur Royals, Muzaffarabad Tigers and Rawalakot Hawks) wrote a letter to the PCB, requesting that the PCB withhold the NOC for the 2022 KPL. They cited the tournament management's inefficiency to handle all of the matters properly. The main concerns were that an audit report was not provided for the first season and a league committee was not formed despite this being included in their agreement. The PCB also said that they would issue a NOC if certain conditions were met. The PCB later issued an NOC after the KPL provided all the requested documents. A league committee was also formed on 7 July 2022.

In August 2022, Nasir Yusuf, one of the co-owners of Kotli Lions, filed a petition in the Sindh High Court that Faisal Nadeem and Khalid Zia, the other co-owners of Kotli Lions, had sidelined him from the team. Yusuf's lawyer said that Nadeem and Zia had overtaken the team and had not contacted Yusuf. They said that Kotli Lions should be barred from participating in the tournament without Yusuf's permission. Faisal Nadeem, Khalid Zia, President of the KPL, Arif Malik, CEO of the KPL, Chaudhry Shahzad Akhtar and vice-president of the KPL, Wasim Akram were all issued notices for 15 August from the court.

During the 2022 KPL, the KPL terminated Kotli Lions’ management after they weren't able to pay outstanding payments. Kotli Lions’ head coach Saeed Azad left the team and was replaced by Mushtaq Ahmed. The KPL management temporarily took over Kotli Lions. The KPL also terminated the Overseas Warriors’ management after they were unable to pay their players. Zeeshan Altaf Lohya was later given ownership of Overseas Warriors.

In January 2023, the KPL management sent a legal notice to Kingdom Valley, sponsors of the 2022 KPL, for not paying the agreed amounts to the KPL. The KPL management claimed that Kingdom Valley still had to pay Rs. 137 million. The KPL also claimed that the KPL still had to pay players Rs. 90 million which they could only pay after receiving payments from sponsors. The owner of Kingdom Valley, Ghulam Hussain Shahid, claimed that the KPL had begged him to sponsor the tournament and had asked him to pay Rs. 40 million in advance and to pay the rest whenever he wanted. He also claimed that he had to pay all government taxes while the KPL paid none. In May 2023, Dawn reported that a number of umpires in the 2022 KPL had still not received their payments. A KPL spokesperson said that these payments had not been made due to huge losses incurred from the tournament but would be cleared soon.

== Criticism ==
During the 2022 KPL, many of the league matches and all of the playoff matches were abandoned due to rain. Ghulam Hussain Shahid, the owner of Jammu Janbaz, criticised the KPL management and he said that the weather should have been considered prior to setting the dates of the tournament. Shahid said that the rain ruined the business end of the tournament and that the tournament should have taken place in Rawalpindi or Lahore as the stadiums there have proper infrastructure and the weather there would have been more suitable to play cricket. He said that he would work with the KPL management next year to improve the tournament.
