= GB Markhors =

Pakistani cricket team

- جی بی مارخورس
- League: Kashmir Premier League

Personnel
- Owner: Jahanzeb Alam

Team information
- City: Gilgit-Baltistan
- Founded: 7 February 2022
- Dissolved: July 2022

History
- KPL wins: 0

GB Markhors (Urdu: جی بی مارخورس) was a Pakistani franchise cricket team that was expected to compete in the Kashmir Premier League in Azad Kashmir. It was founded in 2022 for the second edition of Kashmir Premier League. The franchise was owned by Jahanzeb Alam. The franchise represented Gilgit-Baltistan, a region administrated by Pakistan. The team was dissolved without playing a single tournament.
