= Mohammad Shehzad =

Pakistani cricketer (born 2004)

Personal information
- Born: 5 February 2004 (age 22); Dera Ghazi Khan, Punjab, Pakistan
- Height: 6 ft (183 cm)
- Batting: Right-handed
- Bowling: Right-arm medium-fast
- Role: All-rounder

Domestic team information
- Years: Team
- 2022: Quetta Gladiators
- 2022: Southern Punjab
- 2022: Overseas Warriors
- 2023-: Multan
- 2024: Multan Sultans
- 2025: Islamabad United
- 2026: Sialkot Stallionz

Career statistics
Competition	FC	LA	T20
Matches	17	16	10
Runs scored	1,274	430	135
Batting average	47.18	30.71	16.87
100s/50s	5/6	0/2	0/0
Top score	129	85	28
Balls bowled	964	72	0
Wickets	25	0	–
Bowling average	23.52	–	–
5 wickets in innings	1	–	–
10 wickets in match	0	–	–
Best bowling	5/29	–	–
Catches/stumpings	17/–	8/–	5/–
- Source: ESPNcricinfo, 17 March 2025

Mohammad Shehzad (Punjabi and Urdu: محمد شہزاد; born 5 February 2004), also spelled as Muhammad Shehzad, is a Pakistani cricketer who plays for Multan. In March 2025, he was picked by Islamabad United for the 2025 Pakistan Super League.

== Early career ==
Born in Dera Ghazi Khan, Punjab, Shehzad began to play hard-ball cricket in 2015 and in 2018, at the age of 14, he moved to Lahore, learning cricket at its PakLand Cricket Academy. He then played Under-16 cricket, being named the best batsman in the PCB U-16 Pentangular Tournament 2018-19 while playing for the Multan Under-16s. Due to his performances, he was later picked for the national Under-16 squad, in January 2019 playing against Australia Under-16s in the UAE and in May 2019 against Bangladesh Under-16s. He would then play at Under-19 level after impressing the U19 head coach Ijaz Ahmed.

== Youth career ==
In December 2021, in the Under-19 Asia Cup held in Dubai, Shehzad scored a match-turning 81, guiding his side to victory after India set a challenging total. Pakistan Under-19 defeated India by two wickets in a thrilling match decided on the final ball, and Shehzad was declared Player of the Match.

In January 2022, Shehzad played for the Pakistan national Under-19 team during the 2022 ICC Under-19 Cricket World Cup.

== Domestic career ==
In February 2022, Shehzad was selected for Quetta Gladiators as a replacement pick for James Faulkner for the 2022 Pakistan Super League.

In March 2022, he made his List A debut for Southern Punjab against Balochistan during the 2021–22 Pakistan Cup.

In September 2022, He made his T20 debut for Southern Punjab against Central Punjab during the 2022–23 National T20 Cup.

In March 2025, in the 2024–25 President's Trophy final, playing for Pakistan Television (PTV) against State Bank of Pakistan, Shehzad took a hat-trick, ending with bowling figures of 5/29, in the first day of the first-class match, and later was his team's top-scorer in PTV's first innings, scoring an unbeaten 125* off 152. PTV won the match by 3 wickets, their first President's Trophy title, and Shehzad was declared Player of the Match.
