= Saqib Khan =

Saqib Khan (born 9 September 1995) is a Pakistani cricketer who plays as a right-arm medium fast bowler.

== International career ==
In November 2026, he was named in Pakistan's squad for the test series against Sri Lanka. He made his debut against Sri Lanka, on 9 November 2026.
