= Jammu Janbaz =

Pakistani cricket team

- جموں جانباز
- League: Kashmir Premier League

Personnel
- Captain: Faheem Ashraf
- Coach: Riaz Afridi
- Owner: Ghulam Hussain Shahid

Team information
- City: Jammu, but played all matches in Muzaffarabad
- Founded: 2022; 3 years ago
- Dissolved: 2023; 2 years ago

History
- KPL wins: 0
T20 kit

Jammu Janbaz (Urdu: جموں جانباز) was a Pakistani franchise cricket team that competes in the Kashmir Premier League. It was founded in 2022 after the inaugural edition of Kashmir Premier League. The franchise is owned by Ghulam Hussain Shahid. The franchise represents Jammu, but played all matches in Muzaffarabad.

== History ==
=== 2022 season ===
A few days after the conclusion of the 2021 KPL the President of the KPL, Arif Malik, announced that a seventh team named Jammu Janbaz would be added to the KPL in order to pay tribute to the martyrs of Jammu. In July 2022, it was announced that former Pakistani captain, Shahid Afridi, would join Jammu Janbaz as a mentor. On 15 July 2022, it was announced that Sharjeel Khan would join Jammu Janbaz as their icon player.

== Team identity ==
Year	Kit Manufacturer	Front Branding	Back Branding	Chest Branding	Sleeve Branding
2022		Kingdom Valley	Hope Not Out		

== Current squad ==
- Players with international caps are listed in **bold**.
- Ages are correct as of 21 July 2022

No.	Name	Nationality	Birth date	Category	Batting style	Bowling style	Year signed	Notes
Batsmen
9	Samiullah Afridi	Pakistan	11 November 1996 (aged 25)	Emerging	Right-handed	Leg spin	2022	
51	**Sahibzada Farhan**	Pakistan	6 March 1996 (aged 26)	Diamond	Right-handed		2022	
96	**Umar Akmal**	Pakistan	26 May 1990 (aged 32)	Diamond	Right-handed	Off spin	2022	
98	**Sharjeel Khan**	Pakistan	14 August 1989 (aged 32)	Icon	Left-handed	Leg spin	2022	
	Umar Siddiq	Pakistan	10 October 2000 (aged 21)	Silver	Left-handed	Off spin	2022	
All-rounders
10	**Shahid Afridi**	Pakistan	1 March 1977 (aged 45)	Platinum	Right-handed	Leg spin	2022	Mentor
41	**Faheem Ashraf**	Pakistan	16 January 1994 (aged 28)	Platinum	Left-handed	Right-arm fast medium	2022	Captain
	Ahmed Khan	Pakistan	1 May 2004 (aged 18)	Silver	Right-handed	Right-arm medium	2022	
	Akash Afridi	Pakistan	16 March 1992 (aged 30)	Supplementary	Right-handed	Right-arm fast-medium	2022	
	Azaz Khan	Pakistan	22 September 1984 (aged 37)	Supplementary	Right-handed		2022	
	Mohammad Shehzad	Pakistan	30 September 1990 (aged 31)	Kashmiri	Right-handed		2022	
Wicket-keepers
75	Shahzaib	Pakistan		Silver			2022	
Bowlers
8	Faisal Altaf	United Arab Emirates	15 March 2001 (aged 21)	Kashmiri	Right-handed	Right-arm fast-medium	2022	
11	Mehran Mumtaz	Pakistan	7 March 2003 (aged 19)	Kashmiri	Right-handed	Right-arm medium-fast	2022	
17	**Imran Khan**	Pakistan	15 July 1987 (aged 35)	Silver	Right-handed	Right-arm fast-medium	2022	
23	Usama Mir	Pakistan	23 December 1995 (aged 26)	Gold	Right-handed	Leg spin	2022	
88	Akif Javed	Pakistan	10 October 2000 (aged 21)	Gold	Right-handed	Left-arm medium-fast	2022	
	Hamza Shah Afridi	Pakistan	26 October 2002 (aged 19)	Emerging	Right-handed	Right-arm medium-fast	2022	
	Najam Naseer Kiyani	Pakistan	2 October 2001 (aged 20)	Kashmiri	Left-handed	Left-arm unorthodox spin	2022	
	Naqash Basharat	Pakistan	4 April 1992 (aged 30)	Kashmiri	Left-handed	Left-arm medium-fast	2022	

== Captains ==
No.	Nat.	Player	From	To	Mat	Won	Lost	Tie	NR	SR (%)
1	(Pakistan)	Faheem Ashraf	2022	present	6	2	3	0	1	40.00

== Coaches ==
No.	Nat.	Name	From	To
1	(Pakistan)	Riaz Afridi	2022	Present

== Result summary ==
Year	Pld	Won	Loss	NR	Tied	SR(%)	Position	Summary
2022	6	2	3	1	0	40.00	5/7	Group Stage

=== Head-to-head record ===
Opposition	Span	Mat	Won	Lost	Tied (won)	Tied (lost)	NR	SR(%)
Bagh Stallions	2022–present	1	1	0	0	0	0	100.00
Kotli Lions	2022–present	1	0	1	0	0	0	0.00
Mirpur Royals	2022–present	1	0	1	0	0	0	0.00
Muzaffarabad Tigers	2022–present	1	0	0	0	0	1	–
Rawalakot Hawks	2022–present	1	0	1	0	0	0	0.00
Overseas Warriors	2022–present	1	1	0	0	0	0	100.00

== Statistics ==
=== Most runs ===
Nat.	Player	From	To	Matches	Innings	Runs	Average	HS	100	50
(Pakistan)	Sharjeel Khan	2022	present	5	5	273	54.60	89	0	3
(Pakistan)	Shahzab	2022	present	5	5	118	23.60	40	0	0
(Pakistan)	Sahibzada Farhan	2022	present	5	5	84	16.80	56	0	1
(Pakistan)	Faheem Ashraf	2022	present	5	4	62	15.50	25	0	0
(Pakistan)	Shahid Afridi	2022	present	2	2	52	26.00	37	0	0

Source: Cricinfo, Last updated: 22 August 2022

=== Most wickets ===
Nat.	Player	From	To	Matches	Overs	Wickets	Average	BBI	4w	5w
(Pakistan)	Mehran Mumtaz	2022	present	4	13.1	4	21.50	2/29	0	0
(Pakistan)	Usama Mir	2022	present	4	14.0	4	24.25	2/16	0	0
(Pakistan)	Faheem Ashraf	2022	present	5	15.0	3	43.00	2/34	0	0
(Pakistan)	Ahmed Khan	2022	present	2	5.0	3	16.00	3/28	0	0
(Pakistan)	Najam Naseer Kiyani	2022	present	1	4.0	3	13.67	3/41	0	0

Source: Cricinfo, Last Updated: 22 August 2022
