= Shadab Majeed =

Pakistani cricketer (born 1997)

Personal information
- Born: 7 June 1997 (age 29)

Domestic team information
- Years: Team
- 2020–21: Northern
- 2021: Mirpur Royals (squad no. 38)
- Source: Cricinfo, 8 December 2020

Shadab Majeed (born 7 June 1997) is a Pakistani cricketer. He made his first-class debut on 8 December 2020, for Northern against Central Punjab, in the 2020–21 Quaid-e-Azam Trophy. He made his List A debut on 19 March 2022, for Northern in the 2021–22 Pakistan Cup.
