= Mehran Mumtaz =

Pakistani cricketer (born 2003)

Personal information
- Born: 7 April 2003 (age 23); Rawalpindi, Punjab, Pakistan
- Batting: Left-handed
- Bowling: Slow left-arm orthodox
- Role: Bowler

Domestic team information
- Years: Team
- 2020/21–2023: Northern
- 2024-2025: Peshawar Zalmi (squad no. 167)
- 2026: Islamabad United

Career statistics
Competition	FC	LA	T20
Matches	18	29	19
Runs scored	240	253	50
Batting average	13.33	14.88	6.25
100s/50s	0/0	0/0	0/0
Top score	40	46	16*
Balls bowled	3,210	1,434	408
Wickets	52	32	20
Bowling average	33.36	35.84	25.20
5 wickets in innings	2	0	0
10 wickets in match	1	0	0
Best bowling	6/110	3/48	3/20
Catches/stumpings	7/–	12/–	6/–
- Source: Cricinfo, 25 January 2024

Mehran Mumtaz (born 7 April 2003) is a Pakistani cricketer who plays for Islamabad United in the Pakistan Super League.

== Early life ==
Mehran was born on 7 April 2003 in Rawalpindi, Punjab, with family roots in Azad Kashmir. He began playing cricket in the streets and neighborhoods of Rawalpindi before joining a local cricket club. He initially started as a fast bowler, citing Mohammad Amir as his inspiration.

Mumtaz worked with his brother in the Sunday market near Rawalpindi Cricket Stadium while pursuing his passion for cricket.

== Career ==
Mehran began his professional cricket career through under-16 cricket during the 2016-17 season. He has since represented Pakistan A cricket team as well.

Mehran made his first-class debut on 17 November 2021, for Northern in the 2021–22 Quaid-e-Azam Trophy.

In December 2021, Mehran was named in Pakistan's team for the 2022 ICC Under-19 Cricket World Cup in the West Indies.
