= Ghaffar Kazmi =

Pakistani cricketer (born 1962)

Personal information
- Born: 25 December 1962 (age 63); Lahore, Punjab, Pakistan

Umpiring information
- WT20Is umpired: 3 (2019)
- Source: Cricinfo, 23 November 2015

Ghaffar Kazmi (born 25 December 1962) is a Pakistani former cricketer and a current umpire. He played 150 first-class matches in a career spanning 20 years. As an umpire he officiated in matches in the 2015–16 Quaid-e-Azam Trophy.

In February 2020, he was named in Pakistan's squad for the Over-50s Cricket World Cup played by 12 teams in South Africa. However, the tournament was cancelled during the third round due to the COVID-19 pandemic. In December 2020, he was among the shortlisted candidates for the 2020 PCB Awards for Umpire of the Year.
