= Bagh Stallions =

Pakistani cricket team

- باغ سٹالینس
- Nickname(s): Stallions
- League: Kashmir Premier League

Personnel
- Captain: Umar Amin
- Coach: Abdul Rehman
- Owner: Tauqir Sultan Awan

Team information
- City: Bagh, Kashmir
- Founded: 2021; 4 years ago
- Dissolved: 2023; 2 years ago
- Official website: thebghstallions.com
T20 kit

Bagh Stallions (Urdu: باغ سٹالینس) is a Pakistani professional T20 franchise cricket team that competes in the Kashmir Premier League. Umar Amin is the captain and Abdul Rehman the coach of the team. The franchise represents Bagh which is the chief town and district headquarters of Bagh District in Azad Kashmir.

== History ==
=== 2021 season ===
Bagh Stallions won 2 matches and lost 3 matches in the group stage. They missed out on the playoffs due to their net run rate being worse than Overseas Warriors which meant that they were knocked out in the group stage.

=== 2022 season ===
In July 2022, Kamran Akmal was announced as Bagh Stallion's icon player.

== Team identity ==
Year	Kit Manufacturer	Front Branding	Back Branding	Chest Branding	Sleeve Branding
2021		Glorious Pakistan	Glorious Kashmir	Dawn News	Glorious Kashmir
2022		Hajvairy Group		Glorious Kashmir	

== Current squad ==
- Players with international caps are listed in **bold**.
- Ages are correct as of 21 July 2022

No.	Name	Nationality	Birth date	Category	Batting style	Bowling style	Year signed	Notes
Batsmen
12	**Sohaib Maqsood**	Pakistan	15 April 1987 (aged 35)	Platinum	Right-handed	Right-arm off break	2022	
45	Hasan Raza	Pakistan	6 January 1995 (aged 27)	Kashmiri	Left-handed	Right-arm medium-fast	2022	
	Abdul Bangalzai	Pakistan	4 March 2003 (aged 19)	Supplementary	Right-handed		2022	
All-rounders
8	**Umar Amin**	Pakistan	16 October 1989 (aged 32)	Diamond	Left-handed	Right-arm medium	2022	Captain
10	Sharoon Siraj	Pakistan	14 September 1997 (aged 24)	Silver	Right-handed	Right-arm off spin	2022	
34	**Aamer Yamin**	Pakistan	26 June 1990 (aged 32)	Diamond	Right-handed	Right-arm medium	2021	
41	Aamer Jamal	Pakistan	5 July 1996 (aged 26)	Silver	Right-handed	Right-arm off break	2022	Replacement pick
65	Kashif Bhatti	Pakistan	25 July 1986 (aged 35)	Gold	Right-handed	Left-arm orthodox	2022	
	Atizaz Habib Khan	Pakistan	1 March 1997 (aged 25)	Silver	Right-handed	Right-arm off spin	2022	
	Mohammad Sarwar	Pakistan	20 January 1995 (aged 27)	Silver	Right-handed	Right-arm fast-medium	2022	
Wicket-keepers
23	**Kamran Akmal**	Pakistan	13 January 1982 (aged 40)	Icon	Right-handed		2022	
	Awais Akram	Pakistan	10 March 2000 (aged 22)	Kashmiri	Right-handed		2022	Replacement pick
	Sajjad Ali	Pakistan	3 February 1990 (aged 32)	Emerging	Right-handed		2022	
Bowlers
9	Arsalan Arif	Pakistan	5 January 1993 (aged 29)	Kashmiri	Left-handed	Slow left-arm orthodox	2022	
11	**Rumman Raees**	Pakistan	18 October 1991 (aged 30)	Platinum	Right-handed	Left-arm fast-medium	2022	Vice-captain
14	Mohammad Imran	Pakistan	20 January 2001 (aged 21)	Gold	Right-handed	Left-arm fast-medium	2021	
26	Danyal Allah Ditta	Pakistan	2 July 1995 (aged 27)	Kashmiri	Left-handed	Left-arm slow left-arm orthodox	2022	
55	Maaz Khan	Pakistan	15 December 2000 (aged 21)	Emerging	Right-handed	Right-arm leg spin	2022	
	Ahmed Jamal	Pakistan	3 September 1988 (aged 33)	Silver	Right-handed	Right-arm medium	2022	
	Ali Majid	Pakistan	29 December 1991 (aged 30)	Supplementary	Right-handed	Right-arm medium-fast	2022	
	Amir Shehzad	Pakistan	9 December 1983 (aged 38)	Kashmiri	Right-handed	Right-arm medium-fast	2022	

== Captains ==
No.	Nat.	Player	From	To	Mat	Won	Lost	Tie	NR	SR (%)
1	(Pakistan)	Shan Masood	2021	2021	5	2	3	0	0	40.00
2	(Pakistan)	Umar Amin	2022	present	8	3	1	0	4	75.00
3	(Pakistan)	Rumman Raees	2022	2022	1	0	1	0	0	0.00

== Coaches ==
No.	Nat.	Name	From	To
1	(Pakistan)	Abdul Rehman	2021	Present

== Result summary ==
=== Overall result in KPL ===
Year	Pld	Won	Loss	Tie&W	Tie&L	NR	SR (%)	Position	Summary
2021	5	2	3	0	0	0	40.00	5/6	Group Stage
2022	9	3	2	0	0	4	60.00	2/6	Runners-up
Total	14	5	5	0	0	4	50.00	—	0 titles

=== Head-to-head record ===
Opposition	Span	Mat	Won	Lost	Tied (won)	Tied (lost)	NR	SR (%)
Jammu Janbaz	2022–present	1	0	1	0	0	0	0.00
Kotli Lions	2021–present	2	2	0	0	0	0	100.00
Mirpur Royals	2021–present	4	2	0	0	0	2	100.00
Muzaffarabad Tigers	2021–present	2	0	2	0	0	0	0.00
Rawalakot Hawks	2021–present	2	0	1	0	0	1	0.00
Overseas Warriors	2021–present	3	1	1	0	0	1	50.00

Source: , Last updated: 31 January 2022

== Statistics ==
=== Most runs ===
Nat.	Player	From	To	Matches	Innings	Runs	Average	HS	100	50
(Pakistan)	Shan Masood	2021	2021	5	5	254	50.80	78	0	3
(Pakistan)	Aamer Yamin	2021	present	9	9	215	35.83	69	0	1
(Pakistan)	Iftikhar Ahmed	2021	2021	5	5	183	45.75	86*	0	2
(Pakistan)	Asad Shafiq	2021	2021	5	5	119	29.75	54	0	1
(Pakistan)	Sohaib Maqsood	2022	present	4	4	107	35.67	72*	0	1

Source: Cricinfo, Last updated: 22 August 2022

=== Most wickets ===
Nat.	Player	From	To	Matches	Overs	Wickets	Average	BBI	4w	5w
(Pakistan)	Aamer Yamin	2021	present	10	34.0	10	26.30	2/25	0	0
(Pakistan)	Umaid Asif	2021	2021	5	18.2	9	19.22	3/30	0	0
(Pakistan)	Rumman Raees	2022	present	6	18.4	8	21.00	3/11	0	0
(Pakistan)	Aamer Jamal	2022	present	3	10.0	6	16.00	4/40	1	0
(Pakistan)	Ali Majid	2022	present	5	15.4	6	17.50	3/13	0	0

Source: , Last Updated: 23 August 2022
