= Kotli Lions =

Pakistani professional T20 franchise

- کوٹلی لائنز
- League: Kashmir Premier League

Personnel
- Captain: Khurram Manzoor
- Coach: Mushtaq Ahmed
- Owner: TBA

Team information
- City: Kotli, Kashmir
- Founded: 2021; 4 years ago

History
- KPL wins: 0
T20 kit

Kotli Lions (Urdu: کوٹلی لائنز) is a Pakistani professional T20 franchise that takes part in the Kashmir Premier League. The team is captained by Khurram Manzoor and coached by Mushtaq Ahmed. The franchise represents the city of Kotli, the capital of the Kotli District.

== History ==
=== 2021 season ===
In the 2021 KPL, Kotli Lions won 1 match, lost 3 and had one match end in no result in the group stage. They finished last in the group and were eliminated from the competition.

=== 2022 season ===
In May 2022, former Pakistani captain, Sarfaraz Ahmed, announced that he would represent Kotli Lions in the 2022 KPL. Khurram Manzoor was announced as the team's icon player and captain. During the 2022 KPL, the KPL terminated Kotli Lions’ management after they weren't able to pay outstanding payments. Kotli Lions’ head coach Saeed Azad left the team and was replaced by Mushtaq Ahmed. The KPL management temporarily took over Kotli Lions.

== Team identity ==
Year	Kit Manufacturer	Front Branding	Back Branding	Chest Branding	Sleeve Branding
2021		Faizan Steel	Hashmi Ispaghol	Dawn Media Group	Salaam Takaful
2022		GFS Builders & Developers		Express News	

== Current squad ==
- Players with international caps are listed in **bold**.
- Ages are correct as of 21 July 2022

No.	Name	Nationality	Birth date	Category	Batting style	Bowling style	Year signed	Notes
Batsmen
6	Imran Shah	Pakistan	16 June 1999 (aged 23)	Emerging	Right-handed		2022	
12	**Ahsan Ali**	Pakistan	10 December 1993 (aged 28)	Diamond	Right-handed	Leg break	2021	
18	Naveed Malik	Pakistan	18 March 1995 (aged 27)	Kashmiri	Right-handed	Right-arm medium-fast	2022	
42	**Khurram Manzoor**	Pakistan	10 June 1986 (aged 36)	Icon	Right-handed	Right-arm off spin	2022	Captain
44	Khalid Usman	Pakistan	1 March 1986 (aged 36)	Gold	Right-handed	Left-arm orthodox spin	2021	
100	Omair Yousuf	Pakistan	27 December 1998 (aged 23)		Right-handed		2022	Post-draft signing
	Hanif Azad	Pakistan	7 August 1997 (aged 24)	Silver	Right-handed		2022	
All-rounders
17	Hasan Mohsin	Pakistan	11 January 1998 (aged 24)	Silver	Right-handed	Right-arm medium	2022	
22	**Danish Aziz**	Pakistan	20 November 1995 (aged 26)	Platinum	Left-handed	Slow left-arm orthodox	2022	
	Basit Ali	Pakistan		Kashmiri			2022	
	Mirwais Khan	Pakistan	4 May 1991 (aged 31)		Right-handed	Right-arm medium-fast	2022	Post-draft signing
Wicket-keepers
54	**Sarfaraz Ahmed**	Pakistan	22 May 1987 (aged 35)	Platinum	Right-handed	Right-arm off spin	2022	
	Abdul Rehman	Pakistan		Supplementary			2021	
Bowlers
03	Mujtaba Ghayas	Pakistan	27 July 1987 (aged 34)	Kashmiri	Right-handed	Right-arm medium	2021	
5	Nadeem Khalil	Pakistan	1 November 1997 (aged 24)	Kashmiri	Right-handed	Right-arm fast-medium	2021	
8	Khurram Shehzad	Pakistan	25 November 1999 (aged 22)	Diamond	Right-handed	Right-arm medium	2021	
16	Hassan Khan	Pakistan	16 October 1998 (aged 23)	Silver	Right-handed	Left-arm orthodox	2022	
23	Irfan Ali Qasmi	Pakistan		Emerging	Right-handed	Leg spin	2022	
97	Irfanullah Shah	Pakistan	5 May 1995 (aged 27)	Gold	Right-handed	Right-arm medium-fast	2021	
	Mushtaq Kalhoro	Pakistan	13 March 1997 (aged 25)	Silver	Right-handed	Right-arm medium-fast	2022	
	Zayyan Khan	Pakistan		Kashmiri			2022	

== Captains ==
No.	Nat.	Player	From	To	Mat	Won	Lost	Tie	NR	SR (%)
1	(Pakistan)	Kamran Akmal	2021	2021	5	1	3	0	1	25.00
2	(Pakistan)	Khurram Manzoor	2022	present	7	2	3	0	2	40.00

== Coaches ==
No.	Nat.	Name	From	To
1	(Pakistan)	Abdul Razzaq	2021	2021
2	(Pakistan)	Saeed Azad	2022	2022
3	(Pakistan)	Mushtaq Ahmed	2022	present

== Result summary ==
=== Overall result in KPL ===
Year	Pld	Won	Loss	NR	Tied	SR(%)	Position	Summary
2021	5	1	3	1	0	25.00	6/6	Group Stage
2022	7	2	3	2	0	40.00	4/6	Play-offs

=== Head-to-head record ===
Opposition	Span	Mat	Won	Lost	Tied (won)	Tied (lost)	NR	SR(%)
Bagh Stallions	2021–present	2	0	2	0	0	0	0.00
Jammu Janbaz	2022–present	1	1	0	0	0	0	100.00
Mirpur Royals	2021–present	2	0	1	0	1	0	0.00
Muzaffarabad Tigers	2021–present	2	0	2	0	0	0	0.00
Overseas Warriors	2021–present	3	1	0	0	0	2	100.00
Rawalakot Hawks	2021–present	2	1	0	0	0	1	100.00

Source: , Last updated: 31 January 2022

== Statistics ==
=== Most runs ===
Nat.	Player	From	To	Matches	Innings	Runs	Average	HS	100	50
(Pakistan)	Ahsan Ali	2021	present	9	9	384	54.86	99	0	4
(Pakistan)	Asif Ali	2021	2021	4	4	142	47.33	67	0	1
(Pakistan)	Sarfaraz Ahmed	2022	present	5	4	119	119.00	52*	0	1
(Pakistan)	Kamran Akmal	2021	2021	4	4	102	25.50	60	0	1
(Pakistan)	Khurram Manzoor	2022	present	5	5	130	32.50	85*	0	1

Source: , Last updated: 23 August 2022

=== Most wickets ===
Nat.	Player	From	To	Matches	Overs	Wickets	Average	BBI	4w	5w
(Pakistan)	Khurram Shahzad	2021	present	9	31.0	12	25.67	3/27	0	0
(Pakistan)	Irfanullah Shah	2021	present	8	29.0	9	28.11	3/35	0	0
(Pakistan)	Basit Ali	2022	present	4	12.4	6	17.33	2/19	0	0
(Pakistan)	Danish Aziz	2022	present	4	11.0	3	27.33	2/27	0	0
(Pakistan)	Hassan Khan	2022	present	5	14.2	3	35.67	2/11	0	0

Source: , Last Updated: 23 August 2022
