= Muzaffarabad Tigers =

Pakistani cricket team

- مظفرآباد ٹائیگرز
- Nickname(s): Shan-e-Kashmir
- League: Kashmir Premier League

Personnel
- Captain: Mohammad Hafeez
- Coach: Misbah-ul-Haq
- Owner: Arshad Khan Tanoli

Team information
- City: Muzaffarabad, Kashmir
- Founded: 2021; 4 years ago
- Dissolved: 2023; 2 years ago
- Home ground: Muzaffarabad Cricket Stadium
- Capacity: 10,000

History
- KPL wins: 0
- Official website: www.tigersmuzaffarabad.com
T20 kit

The Muzaffarabad Tigers (Urdu: مظفرآباد ٹائیگرز) is a Pakistani professional T20 franchise cricket team that competes in the Kashmir Premier League. It was founded in 2021 in the inaugural edition of Kashmir Premier League. The team is captained by Mohammad Hafeez and coached by Misbah-ul-Haq. The franchise represents Muzaffarabad which is the capital and largest city of Azad Kashmir.

== History ==
=== 2021 season ===
In the group stage, they won 3 out of their 5 matches and came second in the group stages which meant that they reached the qualifier. They defeated Rawalakot Hawks in the qualifier and advanced to the final. They were defeated by Rawalakot Hawks in the final by 7 runs and finished the tournament as runner-ups.

=== 2022 season ===
In July 2022, Mohammad Hafeez was retained as Muzaffarabad Tigers’ icon player.

== Team identity ==
Year	Kit Manufacturer	Front Branding	Back Branding	Chest Branding	Sleeve Branding
2021		The Sixth Boulevard	Islamabad Associates	FFC - Fertiliser Company Limited	J+ The Jaidad Group , Gold Stone Marketing and Grey Wall Marketing
2022		Islamabad Associates	FFC - Fertiliser Company Limited		

== Current squad ==
- Players with international caps are listed in **bold**.
- Ages are correct as of 21 July 2022

No.	Name	Nationality	Birth date	Category	Batting style	Bowling style	Year signed	Notes
Batsmen
5	Usman Maroof	Pakistan	1 January 1996 (aged 26)	Kashmiri	Right-handed	Right-arm medium-fast	2022	
47	**Aqib Ilyas**	Oman	5 September 1992 (aged 29)	Kashmiri	Right-handed	Off spin	2022	
75	Taimoor Sultan	Pakistan	4 December 1994 (aged 27)	Silver	Right-handed		2021	
77	Salman Fayyaz	Pakistan	11 August 1997 (aged 24)	Silver	Left-handed	Leg spin	2022	
All-rounders
7	Inzamam-ul-Haq	Pakistan	22 July 1997 (aged 24)	Kashmiri	Right-handed	Slow left arm orthodox	2021	
8	**Mohammad Hafeez**	Pakistan	17 October 1980 (aged 41)	Icon	Right-handed	Right-arm off break	2021	Captain
10	**Saad Bin Zafar**	Canada	10 November 1986 (aged 35)	Kashmiri	Left-handed	Slow left-arm orthodox	2022	
33	**Sohail Tanvir**	Pakistan	1 December 1984 (aged 37)	Platinum	Left-handed	Left-arm medium-fast	2021	
48	**Anwar Ali**	Pakistan	25 November 1987 (aged 34)	Diamond	Right-handed	Right-arm fast-medium	2021	
95	**Iftikhar Ahmed**	Pakistan	3 September 1990 (aged 31)	Platinum	Right-handed	Right-arm off break	2022	
Wicket-keepers
13	Haseebullah Khan	Pakistan	4 March 2004 (aged 18)	Diamond	Left-handed		2022	
60	Zeeshan Ashraf	Pakistan	11 May 1992 (aged 30)	Gold	Left-handed	Right-arm off break	2021	
	Ameer Hamza	Pakistan	22 September 1995 (aged 26)	Supplementary	Right-handed		2022	
Bowlers
9	Amir Khan	Pakistan	9 September 2001 (aged 20)	Emerging	Right-handed	Right-arm medium-fast	2022	
14	Ahmed Daniyal	Pakistan	3 July 1997 (aged 25)	Supplementary	Right-handed	Right-arm medium-fast	2022	
35	**Arshad Iqbal**	Pakistan	26 December 2000 (aged 21)	Gold	Right-handed	Right-arm medium-fast	2021	
42	Aaqib Liaquat	Pakistan	28 May 2001 (aged 21)	Emerging	Right-handed	Leg spin	2022	
92	**Mir Hamza**	Pakistan	10 September 1992 (aged 29)	Silver	Left-handed	Left-arm fast-medium	2022	
	Ahmed Safi Abdullah	Pakistan	1 March 1998 (aged 24)	Silver	Left-handed	Slow left-arm orthodox	2022	
	Osama Fazil	Pakistan		Kashmiri		Right-arm fast	2022	

== Captains ==
No.	Nat.	Player	From	To	Mat	Won	Lost	Tie	NR	SR (%)
1	(Pakistan)	Mohammad Hafeez	2021	present	13	6	6	0	1	50.00

== Coaches ==
No.	Nat.	Name	From	To
1	(Pakistan)	Mohtashim Rasheed	2021	2021
2	(Pakistan)	Misbah-ul-Haq	2022	Present

== Result summary ==
=== Overall result in KPL ===
Year	Pld	Won	Loss	NR	Tied	SR(%)	Position	Summary
2021	7	4	3	0	0	57.14	2/6	Runners-up
2022	6	2	3	1	0	40.00	7/7	Group Stage

=== Head-to-head record ===
Opposition	Span	Mat	Won	Lost	Tied	NR	SR (%)
Bagh Stallions	2021–present	2	2	0	0	0	100.00
Jammu Janbaz	2022–present	1	0	0	0	1	–
Kotli Lions	2021–present	2	2	0	0	0	100.00
Mirpur Royals	2021–present	2	0	2	0	0	0.00
Overseas Warriors	2021–present	2	1	1	0	0	50.00
Rawalakot Hawks	2021–present	4	1	3	0	0	25.00

Source: , Last updated: 31 January 2022

== Statistics ==
=== Most runs ===
Nat.	Player	From	To	Matches	Innings	Runs	Average	HS	100	50
(Pakistan)	Zeeshan Ashraf	2021	present	12	12	311	28.27	107	1	0
(Pakistan)	Mohammad Hafeez	2021	present	12	12	289	24.08	110	1	1
(Pakistan)	Anwar Ali	2021	present	12	11	264	33.00	57	0	1
(Pakistan)	Sohaib Maqsood	2021	2021	7	7	194	32.33	60	0	2
(Pakistan)	Haseebullah Khan	2022	present	5	5	142	28.40	67	0	1

Source: , Last updated: 22 August 2022

=== Most wickets ===
Nat.	Player	From	To	Matches	Overs	Wickets	Average	BBI	4w	5w
(Pakistan)	Arshad Iqbal	2021	present	12	44.4	17	23.18	3/17	0	0
(Pakistan)	Sohail Tanvir	2021	present	11	38.3	10	35.80	4/29	1	0
(Pakistan)	Mohammad Hafeez	2021	present	9	20.0	7	23.14	2/24	0	0
(Pakistan)	Usama Mir	2021	2021	6	21.0	7	24.14	3/18	0	0
(Pakistan)	Mohammad Wasim	2021	2021	7	28.0	6	44.00	3/26	0	0

Source: , Last Updated: 22 August 2022
