= Overseas Warriors =

Pakistani cricket team

- اوورسیز وارئیرز
- League: Kashmir Premier League

Personnel
- Captain: Asad Shafiq
- Coach: Azam Khan
- Owner: Zeeshan Altaf Lohya

Team information
- Colors: Red and black
- Founded: 2021; 5 years ago
- Dissolved: 2023; 3 years ago

History
- KPL wins: 0
T20 kit

The Overseas Warriors (Urdu: اوورسیز وارئیرز) is a Pakistani professional T20 franchise cricket team who compete in the Kashmir Premier League. They were established in 2021 following the announcement of the Kashmir Premier League by the PCB. The team is captained by Asad Shafiq and coached by Azam Khan. The franchise represents the Kashmiri diaspora.

== History ==
=== 2021 season ===
In the group stage, they won 2 matches and lost 3 but due to them having a better net run rate they qualified for the 1st eliminator ahead of Bagh Stallions. They were knocked out in the 1st eliminator as they were defeated by 4 wickets by Mirpur Royals.

=== 2022 season ===
In July 2022, Asad Shafiq was announced as Overseas Warriors’ icon player.

== Current squad ==
- Players with international caps are listed in **bold**.
- Ages are correct as of 21 July 2022

| No. | Name | Nationality | Birth date | Category | Batting style | Bowling style | Year signed | Notes |
Batsmen
| 1 | Malik Nisar | Pakistan | | Kashmiri | Right-handed | Right-arm medium | 2022 | |
| 81 | **Asad Shafiq** | Pakistan | 28 January 1986 (aged 36) | Icon | Right-handed | Right-arm off break | 2022 | Captain |
| | Hanan Ahmed | Pakistan | | Kashmiri | | | 2022 | |
| | Khawaja Nafay | Pakistan | 13 February 2002 (aged 20) | Emerging | Right-handed | Right-arm off break | 2022 | |
| | Hashim Ali | Pakistan | | Kashmiri | Left-handed | | 2022 | |
All-rounders
| 15 | Saif Badar | Pakistan | 3 July 1998 (aged 24) | Gold | Right-handed | Leg break | 2022 | |
| 27 | Muhammad Shehzad | Pakistan | 5 February 2004 (aged 18) | Silver | Right-handed | Right-arm medium-fast | 2022 | |
| 29 | Mohammad Imran | Pakistan | 25 December 1996 (aged 25) | Diamond | Right-handed | Right-arm medium fast | 2022 | |
| 31 | **Bilal Asif** | Pakistan | 24 September 1985 (aged 36) | Silver | Right-handed | Off spin | 2022 | |
| 77 | Adil Amin | Pakistan | 13 December 1990 (aged 31) | Silver | Right-handed | Off spin | 2022 | |
| 98 | Kamran Ghulam | Pakistan | 10 October 1995 (aged 26) | Platinum | Right-handed | Slow left-arm orthodox | 2021 | |
| | Nosherwan Ibrahim | Pakistan | | | | | 2022 | Post-draft signing |
| | Umer Zeeshan | United Arab Emirates | | Emerging | Right-handed | Right-arm medium | 2022 | |
Wicket-keepers
| 23 | **Azam Khan** | Pakistan | 10 August 1998 (aged 23) | Platinum | Right-handed | | 2021 | |
Bowlers
| 13 | **Umaid Asif** | Pakistan | 30 March 1984 (aged 38) | Gold | Right-handed | Right-arm medium-fast | 2022 | |
| 14 | **Sohail Khan** | Pakistan | 6 March 1984 (aged 38) | Diamond | Right-handed | Right-arm fast | 2021 | |
| | Ali Shafiq | Pakistan | 16 November 1996 (aged 25) | Silver | Right-handed | Right-arm medium-fast | 2022 | |
| | Farhan Shafiq | Pakistan | 5 December 1999 (aged 22) | Kashmiri | Left-handed | Slow left-arm orthodox | 2022 | |
| | Saad Asif | Pakistan | | Kashmiri | | | 2022 | |
| | Sameer Khan | Pakistan | 21 October 2006 (aged 15) | Supplementary | Left-handed | Slow left-arm orthodox | 2022 | |
| | Shayan Raza | Pakistan | 19 September 2006 (aged 15) | Supplementary | Left-handed | Slow left-arm orthodox | 2022 | |

== Result summary ==
| Year | Pld | Won | Loss | NR | Tied | SR(%) | Position | Summary |
|---|---|---|---|---|---|---|---|---|
| 2021 | 6 | 2 | 4 | 0 | 0 | 33.33 | 4/6 | Play-offs |
| 2022 | 8 | 3 | 2 | 3 | 0 | 60.00 | 3/7 | Play-offs |

=== Head-to-head record ===
As of 31 January 2022

| Opposition | Span | Mat | Won | Lost | Tied (won) | Tied (lost) | NR | SR(%) |
|---|---|---|---|---|---|---|---|---|
| Bagh Stallions | 2021–present | 1 | 1 | 0 | 0 | 0 | 0 | 100.00 |
| Jammu Janbaz | 2022–present | 1 | 0 | 1 | 0 | 0 | 0 | 0.00 |
| Kotli Lions | 2021–present | 2 | 0 | 1 | 0 | 0 | 1 | 0.00 |
| Mirpur Royals | 2021–present | 4 | 1 | 2 | 0 | 0 | 1 | 33.33 |
| Muzaffarabad Tigers | 2021–present | 2 | 1 | 1 | 0 | 0 | 0 | 50.00 |
| Rawalakot Hawks | 2021–present | 2 | 2 | 0 | 0 | 0 | 0 | 100.00 |

- Source: CricInfo

== Statistics ==
As of 23 August 2022

=== Most runs ===
| Player | From | To | Matches | Runs |
|---|---|---|---|---|
| Kamran Ghulam | 2021 | present | 11 | 237 |
| Azam Khan | 2021 | present | 11 | 222 |
| Asad Shafiq | 2022 | present | 5 | 221 |
| Nasir Nawaz | 2021 | 2021 | 6 | 209 |
| Haider Ali | 2021 | 2021 | 5 | 189 |

- Source: CricInfo

=== Most wickets ===
| Player | From | To | Matches | Wickets |
|---|---|---|---|---|
| Sohail Khan | 2021 | present | 10 | 15 |
| Abbas Afridi | 2021 | 2021 | 5 | 7 |
| Muhammad Musa | 2021 | 2021 | 6 | 6 |
| Farhan Shafiq | 2022 | present | 4 | 5 |
| Ali Shafiq | 2022 | present | 3 | 5 |

- Source: CricInfo
