= Rawalakot Hawks in 2021 =

1st season of Rawalakot Hawks in the Kashmir Premier League

Rawalakot Hawks
2021 season
- Coach: Arshad Khan
- Captain: Shahid Afridi
- KPL 2021: 1st (winners)
- Most runs: Kashif Ali (242)
- Most wickets: Asif Afridi (12)

Rawalakot Hawks is a franchise cricket team that represents Rawalakot, Azad Kashmir in the Kashmir Premier League. They were coached by Arshad Khan and captained by Shahid Afridi. They won the inaugural edition of the KPL by defeating Muzaffarabad Tigers in the final.

== Squad ==
- Players with international caps are listed in **bold**.
- Ages are correct as of 3 July 2021

No.	Name	Nationality	Birth date	Category	Batting style	Bowling style	Year signed	Notes
Batsmen
7	**Ahmed Shehzad**	Pakistan	23 November 1991 (aged 29)	Diamond	Right-handed	Right-arm leg break	2021	
9	Samiullah Afridi	Pakistan	11 November 1996 (aged 24)	Emerging	Right-handed	leg break	2021	
27	Kashif Ali	England	7 February 1998 (aged 23)	Emerging	Right-handed	leg break	2021	
51	**Sahibzada Farhan**	Pakistan	6 March 1996 (aged 25)	Gold	Right-handed		2021	
All-rounders
5	**Hussain Talat**	Pakistan	12 February 1996 (aged 25)	Diamond	Right-handed	Right-arm fast-medium	2021	
10	**Shahid Afridi**	Pakistan	1 March 1977 (aged 44)	Icon	Right-handed	Right-arm leg spin	2021	Captain
16	**Umar Amin**	Pakistan	16 October 1989 (aged 31)	Gold	Left-handed	Right-arm medium	2021	Replacement pick.
22	**Danish Aziz**	Pakistan	20 November 1995 (aged 25)	Gold	Left-handed	Slow left-arm orthodox	2021	
29	Mohammad Imran	Pakistan	25 December 1996 (aged 24)	Silver	Right-handed	Right-arm medium fast	2021	
31	Asif Afridi	Pakistan	25 December 1986 (aged 34)	Silver	Left-handed	Left-arm Slow left-arm orthodox	2021	Post-draft signing
N/A	Shahid Ilyas	Pakistan	25 September 1992 (aged 28)	Emerging	Right-handed	Right-arm fast-medium	2021	
Wicket-keepers
19	Raja Shahzad	Pakistan		Emerging	Right-handed	Right-arm medium	2021	Post-draft signing
25	Bismillah Khan	Pakistan	1 March 1990 (aged 31)	Silver	Right-handed		2021	
N/A	**Matt Prior**	England	26 December 1982 (aged 38)	Overseas	Right-handed		2021	Overseas; Pulled out of the tournament.
Bowlers
8	Faisal Altaf	United Arab Emirates	15 March 2001 (aged 20)	Emerging	Right-handed	Right-arm fast-medium	2021	
21	Zaman Khan	Pakistan	10 September 2001 (aged 19)	Emerging	Right-handed	Right-arm fast-medium	2021	
23	Mohammad Irfan	Pakistan	15 May 1995 (aged 26)	Silver	Right-handed	Right-arm fast	2021	
36	**Usman Shinwari**	Pakistan	5 January 1994 (aged 27)	Platinum	Right-handed	Left-arm fast-medium	2021	Post-draft signing.
58	Najeebullah Afridi	Pakistan	3 March 1990 (aged 31)	Emerging	Right-handed	Right-arm medium	2021	Post-draft signing
58	**Waqas Maqsood**	Pakistan	4 November 1987 (aged 33)	Gold	Left-handed	Left-arm fast-medium	2021	
N/A	**Mohammad Hasnain**	Pakistan	5 April 2000 (aged 21)	Platinum	Right-handed	Right-arm fast	2021	
N/A	**Zafar Gohar**	Pakistan	1 February 1995 (aged 26)	Silver	Left-handed	Slow left-arm orthodox	2021	

== Season standings ==
=== Points table ===
Pos	Team	Pld	W	L	NR	Pts	NRR
1	Rawalakot Hawks (C)	5	3	1	1	7	0.228
2	Muzaffarabad Tigers (R)	5	3	2	0	6	0.530
3	Mirpur Royals (3rd)	5	3	2	0	6	−0.323
4	Overseas Warriors (4th)	5	2	3	0	4	−0.032
5	Bagh Stallions	5	2	3	0	4	−0.201
6	Kotli Lions	5	1	3	1	3	−0.107

Source: ESPNcricinfo
- Top 4 teams qualified for the playoffs
- Advanced to Qualifier
- Advanced to Eliminator 1

Notes:

- C = Champions;
- R = Runner-up;
- (x) = Position at the end of the tournament;

== League fixtures and results ==
Match 1
6 August 2021
20:30 (N)
Scorecard

Rawalakot Hawks; 194/6 (20 overs)	v	Mirpur Royals; 151/8 (20 overs)
Ahmed Shehzad 69 (42); Amad Butt 3/20 (4 overs)		Shoaib Malik 77 (51); Shahid Afridi 2/27 (4 overs)

Rawalakot Hawks won by 43 runs
Muzaffarabad Cricket Stadium, Muzaffarabad
Umpires: Ahsan Raza (Pak) and Asif Yaqoob (Pak)
Player of the match: Bismillah Khan (Rawalakot Hawks)

- Mirpur Royals won the toss and elected to field.

Match 5
8 August 2021
19:30 (N)
Scorecard

Rawalakot Hawks	v	Kotli Lions

Match Abandoned
Muzaffarabad Cricket Stadium, Muzaffarabad

Match 7
9 August 2021
19:30 (N)
Scorecard

Rawalakot Hawks; 175/7 (20 overs)	v	Muzaffarabad Tigers; 174/8 (20 overs)
Hussain Talat 47* (35); Mohammad Wasim 3/26 (4 overs)		Mohammad Hafeez 44 (31); Zaman Khan 3/27 (4 overs)

Rawalakot Hawks won by 1 run
Muzaffarabad Cricket Stadium, Muzaffarabad
Umpires: Asif Yaqoob (Pak) and Imtiaz Iqbal (Pak)
Player of the match: Hussain Talat (Rawalakot Hawks)

- Rawalakot Hawks won the toss and elected to bat
- Mohammad Wasim took the first-ever hat trick in KPL history.

Match 10
11 August 2021
14:00
Scorecard

Bagh Stallions; 156/9 (20 overs)	v	Rawalakot Hawks; 157/5 (18.2 overs)
Aamer Yamin 69 (34); Zaman Khan 3/18 (4 overs)		Kashif Ali 54 (40); Umaid Asif 2/27 (3 overs)

Rawalakot Hawks won by 5 wickets
Muzaffarabad Cricket Stadium, Muzaffarabad
Umpires: Asif Yaqoob (Pak) and Mohammad Sajid (Pak)
Player of the match: Aamer Yamin (Bagh Stallions)

- Bagh Stallions won the toss and elected to bat

Match 13
12 August 2021
15:30 (N)
Scorecard

Rawalakot Hawks; 145/9 (20 overs)	v	Overseas Warriors; 133/3 (13.1 overs)
Umar Amin 55 (42); Abbas Afridi 5/18 (4 overs)		Nasir Nawaz 56 (36); Asif Afridi 2/29 (4 overs)

Overseas Warriors won by 7 wickets (DLS method)
Muzaffarabad Cricket Stadium, Muzaffarabad
Umpires: Aleem Dar (Pak) and Majid Hussain (Pak)
Player of the match: Nasir Nawaz (Overseas Warriors)

- Overseas Warriors won the toss and elected to field
- Target reduced to 133 from 18 overs

== Playoffs ==
=== Qualifier ===
Match 16
14 August 2021
16:00 (N)
Scorecard

Muzaffarabad Tigers; 164/8 (20 overs)	v	Rawalakot Hawks; 157 (19.4 overs)
Anwar Ali 57 (34); Mohammad Imran 2/9 (2 overs)		Hussain Talat 52 (35); Sohail Tanvir 4/29 (4 overs)

Muzaffarabad Tigers won by 7 runs
Muzaffarabad Cricket Stadium, Muzaffarabad
Umpires: Aleem Dar (Pak) and Asif Yaqoob (Pak)
Player of the match: Anwar Ali (Muzaffarabad Tigers)

- Rawalakot Hawks won the toss and elected to field
- As a result of this match Muzaffarabad Tigers advanced to the final.
- As a result of this match Rawalakot Hawks advanced to eliminator 2.

=== Eliminator 2 ===
Match 18
16 August 2021
16:00 (N)
Scorecard

Mirpur Royals; 236/4 (20 overs)	v	Rawalakot Hawks; 237/6 (19.4 overs)
Sharjeel Khan 141 (63); Zaman Khan 2/18 (4 overs)		Kashif Ali 114* (51); Amad Butt 3/40 (4 overs)

Rawalakot Hawks won by 4 wickets
Muzaffarabad Cricket Stadium, Muzaffarabad
Umpires: Aleem Dar (Pak) and Asif Yaqoob (Pak)
Player of the match: Kashif Ali (Rawalakot Hawks)

- Rawalakot Hawks won the toss and elected to field
- As a result of this match Rawalakot Hawks advanced to the final.
- As a result of this match Mirpur Royals were eliminated from the competition.
- Sharjeel Khan and Kashif Ali scored their first centuries in the KPL

=== Final ===
Match 19
17 August 2021
19:00 (N)
Scorecard

Rawalakot Hawks; 169/7 (20 overs)	v	Muzaffarabad Tigers; 162/9 (20 overs)
Kashif Ali 54 (29); Usama Mir 2/25 (4 overs)		Zeeshan Ashraf 46 (26); Hussain Talat 3/18 (4 overs)

Rawalakot Hawks won by 7 runs
Muzaffarabad Cricket Stadium, Muzaffarabad
Umpires: Ahsan Raza (Pak) and Aleem Dar (Pak)
Player of the match: Asif Afridi (Rawalakot Hawks)

- Muzaffarabad Tigers won the toss and elected to field
- Rawalakot Hawks won the 2021 KPL as a result of this match

== Statistics ==
=== Most runs ===
Nat.	Player	Matches	Innings	Runs	Average	HS	100	50
(England)	Kashif Ali	7	7	242	48.40	114*	1	2
(Pakistan)	Hussain Talat	7	7	227	56.75	69*	0	3
(Pakistan)	Bismillah Khan	6	6	157	26.16	59	0	1
(Pakistan)	Ahmed Shehzad	5	4	149	37.25	69	0	2
(Pakistan)	Sahibzada Farhan	4	4	84	21.00	28	0	0

Source: Score360

=== Most wickets ===
Nat.	Player	Matches	Overs	Wickets	Average	BBI	4w	5w
(Pakistan)	Asif Afridi	7	26.0	12	15.16	3/21	0	0
(Pakistan)	Zaman Khan	6	23.0	10	17.80	3/18	0	0
(Pakistan)	Shahid Afridi	6	22.0	8	20.62	2/27	0	0
(Pakistan)	Hussain Talat	7	11.0	4	25.75	3/18	0	0
(Pakistan)	Mohammad Imran	5	13.0	4	35.00	2/9	0	0

Source: Score360
