= 2021 Kashmir Premier League (Pakistan) players draft =

List of cricketers

2021 KPL Draft

General information
- Sport: Cricket
- Date: 3 July 2021
- Location: Tulip Banquet Hall; Islamabad, Pakistan

Overview
- League: Kashmir Premier League
- Teams: 6
- First selection: Herschelle Gibbs, Overseas Warriors

The players draft for the 2021 Kashmir Premier League took place on 3 July 2021 at the Tulip Banquet Hall in Islamabad. A total of 413 players signed up for the KPL. The players were divided into 7 categories: Icon, Overseas, Platinum, Diamond, Gold, Silver and Emerging. The emerging category was further divided into Overseas Kashmiris, Local Kashmiris and Non-Kashmiris. Each team chose 1 Icon player, 1 Overseas player, 1 Platinum player, 2 Diamond players, 2 Gold players, 3 Silver players and 5 Emerging players. The participants in the draft ceremony included Chairman of the Kashmir Committee Shehryar Afridi, Senator Faisal Javed, President of the KPL: Arif Malik and CEO of the KPL: Chaudhary Shahzad Akhtar.

== Players signed up per country ==
Country	Number of Players
Pakistan	364
England	25
United Arab Emirates	9
South Africa	3
Australia	2
Canada	2
Bahrain	1
Germany	1
Hong Kong	1
Italy	1
Sri Lanka	1
Turkey	1
United States	1
West Indies	1
Total	413

== Draft picks ==
Herschelle Gibbs was the first player to be picked in the draft. Shan Masood was the first non-foreign player to be picked in the draft. The icon players had already been signed prior to the draft.

Category	Pick No.	Team	Nationality	Name
Overseas	1	Overseas Warriors	South Africa	Herschelle Gibbs
Overseas	2	Bagh Stallions	England	Phil Mustard
Overseas	3	Rawalakot Hawks	England	Matt Prior
Overseas	4	Mirpur Royals	England	Owais Shah
Overseas	5	Muzaffarabad Tigers	Sri Lanka	Tillakaratne Dilshan
Overseas	6	Kotli Lions	England	Monty Panesar
Platinum	1	Bagh Stallions	Pakistan	Shan Masood
Platinum	2	Kotli Lions	Pakistan	Kamran Akmal
Platinum	3	Muzaffarabad Tigers	Pakistan	Sohail Tanvir
Platinum	4	Mirpur Royals	Pakistan	Sharjeel Khan
Platinum	5	Overseas Warriors	Pakistan	Haider Ali
Platinum	6	Rawalakot Hawks	Pakistan	Mohammad Hasnain
Diamond	1	Muzaffarabad Tigers	Pakistan	Sohaib Maqsood
Diamond	2	Kotli Lions	Pakistan	Asif Ali
Diamond	3	Bagh Stallions	Pakistan	Iftikhar Ahmed
Diamond	4	Mirpur Royals	Pakistan	Khushdil Shah
Diamond	5	Rawalakot Hawks	Pakistan	Hussain Talat
Diamond	6	Overseas Warriors	Pakistan	Sohail Khan
Diamond	7	Rawalakot Hawks	Pakistan	Ahmed Shehzad
Diamond	8	Overseas Warriors	Pakistan	Azam Khan
Diamond	9	Kotli Lions	Pakistan	Usman Qadir
Diamond	10	Muzaffarabad Tigers	Pakistan	Mohammad Wasim
Diamond	11	Mirpur Royals	Pakistan	Mohammad Irfan
Diamond	12	Bagh Stallions	Pakistan	Umaid Asif
Gold	1	Overseas Warriors	Pakistan	Muhammad Musa
Gold	2	Rawalakot Hawks	Pakistan	Danish Aziz
Gold	3	Muzaffarabad Tigers	Pakistan	Arshad Iqbal
Gold	4	Bagh Stallions	Pakistan	Rohail Nazir
Gold	5	Mirpur Royals	Pakistan	Salman Irshad
Gold	6	Kotli Lions	Pakistan	Imran Khan
Gold	7	Rawalakot Hawks	Pakistan	Waqas Maqsood
Gold	8	Muzaffarabad Tigers	Pakistan	Zeeshan Ashraf
Gold	9	Bagh Stallions	Pakistan	Mohammad Ilyas
Gold	10	Kotli Lions	Pakistan	Akif Javed
Gold	11	Mirpur Royals	Pakistan	Amad Butt
Gold	12	Overseas Warriors	Pakistan	Haris Sohail
Silver	1	Rawalakot Hawks	Pakistan	Zafar Gohar
Silver	2	Kotli Lions	Pakistan	Khalid Usman
Silver	3	Muzaffarabad Tigers	Pakistan	Sohail Akhtar
Silver	4	Overseas Warriors	Pakistan	Qasim Akram
Silver	5	Bagh Stallions	Pakistan	Mohammad Imran
Silver	6	Mirpur Royals	Pakistan	Mukhtar Ahmed
Silver	7	Muzaffarabad Tigers	Pakistan	Usama Mir
Silver	8	Overseas Warriors	Pakistan	Hammad Azam
Silver	9	Kotli Lions	Pakistan	Irfanullah Shah
Silver	10	Bagh Stallions	Pakistan	Zeeshan Malik
Silver	11	Rawalakot Hawks	Pakistan	Bismillah Khan
Silver	12	Mirpur Royals	Pakistan	Abrar Ahmed
Silver	13	Rawalakot Hawks	Pakistan	Mohammad Imran Randhawa
Silver	14	Kotli Lions	Pakistan	Junaid Ali
Silver	15	Overseas Warriors	Pakistan	Abbas Afridi
Silver	16	Muzaffarabad Tigers	Pakistan	Anwar Ali
Silver	17	Mirpur Royals	Pakistan	Muhammad Akhlaq
Silver	18	Bagh Stallions	Pakistan	Usman Mughal
Emerging	1	Kotli Lions	United States	Abdullah Syed
Emerging	2	Bagh Stallions	Pakistan	Zeeshan Zameer
Emerging	3	Rawalakot Hawks	England	Kashif Ali
Emerging	4	Overseas Warriors	Pakistan	Rashid Naseer
Emerging	5	Muzaffarabad Tigers	Pakistan	Arsalan Arif
Emerging	6	Mirpur Royals	Pakistan	Shadab Majeed
Emerging	7	Bagh Stallions	England	Furqan Shafique
Emerging	8	Mirpur Royals	Pakistan	Danyal Allah Ditta
Emerging	9	Muzaffarabad Tigers	Pakistan	Tahir Hussain
Emerging	10	Overseas Warriors	England	Uthman Ali Khan
Emerging	11	Kotli Lions	Pakistan	Syed Hashim Ali
Emerging	12	Rawalakot Hawks	United Arab Emirates	Faisal Altaf
Emerging	13	Kotli Lions	Pakistan	Hasan Raza
Emerging	14	Bagh Stallions	Pakistan	Sufyan Moqeem
Emerging	15	Mirpur Royals	Pakistan	Mohammad Taha
Emerging	16	Rawalakot Hawks	Pakistan	Zaman Khan
Emerging	17	Overseas Warriors	Pakistan	Naveed Malik
Emerging	18	Muzaffarabad Tigers	Pakistan	Inzamam-ul-Haq
Emerging	19	Overseas Warriors	Pakistan	Waleed Ahmed
Emerging	20	Kotli Lions	Pakistan	Yasir Jan
Emerging	21	Mirpur Royals	Pakistan	Ibtesam-ul-Haq
Emerging	22	Muzaffarabad Tigers	England	Usman Arshad
Emerging	23	Rawalakot Hawks	Pakistan	Samiullah Afridi
Emerging	24	Bagh Stallions	Pakistan	Mohammad Junaid
Emerging	25	Kotli Lions	Pakistan	Abdul Rehman
Emerging	26	Muzaffarabad Tigers	Pakistan	Taimoor Sultan
Emerging	27	Rawalakot Hawks	Pakistan	Shahid Ilyas
Emerging	28	Bagh Stallions	Pakistan	Aamir Sohail
Emerging	29	Mirpur Royals	Pakistan	Ammad Alam
Emerging	30	Overseas Warriors	Pakistan	Raza-ul-Mustafa

== Draft summary ==
The following is the summary of the teams.

Category	Bagh Stallions	Kotli Lions	Mirpur Royals	Muzaffarabad Tigers	Overseas Warriors	Rawalakot Hawks
Icon	(Pakistan) Shadab Khan	(Pakistan) Fakhar Zaman	(Pakistan) Shoaib Malik	(Pakistan) Mohammad Hafeez	(Pakistan) Imad Wasim	(Pakistan) Shahid Afridi
Overseas	(England) Phil Mustard	(England) Monty Panesar	(England) Owais Shah	(Sri Lanka) Tillakaratne Dilshan	(South Africa) Herschelle Gibbs	(England) Matt Prior
Platinum	(Pakistan) Shan Masood	(Pakistan) Kamran Akmal	(Pakistan) Sharjeel Khan	(Pakistan) Sohail Tanvir	(Pakistan) Haider Ali	(Pakistan) Mohammad Hasnain
Diamond	(Pakistan) Iftikhar Ahmed; (Pakistan) Umaid Asif	(Pakistan) Asif Ali; (Pakistan) Usman Qadir	(Pakistan) Khushdil Shah; (Pakistan) Mohammad Irfan	(Pakistan) Mohammad Wasim; (Pakistan) Sohaib Maqsood	(Pakistan) Azam Khan; (Pakistan) Sohail Khan	(Pakistan) Ahmed Shehzad; (Pakistan) Hussain Talat
Gold	(Pakistan) Mohammad Ilyas; (Pakistan) Rohail Nazir	(Pakistan) Akif Javed; (Pakistan) Imran Khan	(Pakistan) Amad Butt; (Pakistan) Salman Irshad	(Pakistan) Arshad Iqbal; (Pakistan) Zeeshan Ashraf	(Pakistan) Haris Sohail; (Pakistan) Muhammad Musa	(Pakistan) Sahibzada Farhan; (Pakistan) Danish Aziz
Silver	(Pakistan) Mohammad Imran; (Pakistan) Zeeshan Malik; (Pakistan) Usman Mughal	(Pakistan) Irfanullah Shah; (Pakistan) Junaid Ali; (Pakistan) Khalid Usman	(Pakistan) Abrar Ahmed; (Pakistan) Muhammad Akhlaq; (Pakistan) Mukhtar Ahmed	(Pakistan) Anwar Ali; (Pakistan) Sohail Akhtar; (Pakistan) Usama Mir	(Pakistan) Asif Afridi; (Pakistan) Nasir Nawaz; (Pakistan) Qasim Akram	(Pakistan) Mohammad Imran Randhawa; (Pakistan) Mohammad Irfan; (Pakistan) Zafar Gohar
Emerging	(Pakistan) Aamir Sohail; (England) Furqan Shafique; (Pakistan) Mohammad Junaid; (Pakistan) Sufyan Moqeem; (Pakistan) Zeeshan Zameer	(Pakistan) Abdul Rehman; (United States) Abdullah Syed; (Pakistan) Hasan Raza; (Pakistan) Syed Hashim Ali; (Pakistan) Yasir Jan	(Pakistan) Ammad Alam; (Pakistan) Danyal Allah Ditta; (Pakistan) Ibtesam-ul-Haq; (Pakistan) Mohammad Taha; (Pakistan) Shadab Majeed	(Pakistan) Arsalan Arif; (Pakistan) Inzamam-ul-Haq; (Pakistan) Taimoor Sultan; (Pakistan) Tahir Hussain; (England) Usman Arshad	(Pakistan) Naveed Malik; (Pakistan) Rashid Naseer; (Pakistan) Raza-ul-Mustafa; (England) Uthman Ali Khan; (Pakistan) Waleed Ahmed	(United Arab Emirates) Faisal Altaf; (England) Kashif Ali; (Pakistan) Samiullah Afridi; (Pakistan) Shahid Ilyas; (Pakistan) Zaman Khan

== Post draft signings ==
Players	Pre-Draft Category
(Pakistan) Asad Shafiq	Platinum
(Pakistan) Usman Shinwari	Platinum
(Pakistan) Aamer Yamin	Gold
(Pakistan) Agha Salman	Gold
(Pakistan) Kamran Ghulam	Gold
(Pakistan) Sameen Gul	Gold
(Pakistan) Umar Amin	Gold
(Pakistan) Adil Amin	Silver
(Pakistan) Ahsan Ali	Silver
(Pakistan) Asif Afridi	Silver
(Pakistan) Hasan Khan	Silver
(Pakistan) Kashif Bhatti	Silver
(Pakistan) Khurram Shahzad	Silver
(Pakistan) Mohammad Haris	Silver
(Pakistan) Saif Badar	Silver
(Pakistan) Basit Ali	Emerging
(Pakistan) Faizan Saleem	Emerging
(Pakistan) Malik Nisar	Emerging
(Pakistan) Mujtaba Ghayyas	Emerging
(Pakistan) Nadeem Khalil	Emerging
(Pakistan) Najeebullah Afridi	Emerging
(Pakistan) Raja Farhan Khan	Emerging
(Pakistan) Raja Shahzad	Emerging
(Pakistan) Usman Yousuf	Emerging
