= Muzaffarabad Tigers in 2021 =

1st season of Muzaffarabad Tigers in the Kashmir Premier League

Muzaffarabad Tigers
2021 season
- Coach: Mohtashim Rasheed
- Captain: Mohammad Hafeez
- KPL 2021: 2nd (runner-up)
- Most runs: Zeeshan Ashraf (284)
- Most wickets: Sohail Tanvir (8); Arshad Iqbal (8)

Muzaffarabad Tigers is a franchise cricket team that represents Muzaffarabad, Azad Kashmir in the Kashmir Premier League. They were coached by Mohtashim Rasheed, and captained by Mohammad Hafeez. They lost in the final to Rawalakot Hawks.

== Squad ==
- Players with international caps are listed in **bold**.
- Ages are correct as of 3 July 2021

No.	Name	Nationality	Birth date	Category	Batting style	Bowling style	Year signed	Notes
Batsmen
1	Malik Nisar	Pakistan		Emerging	Right-handed	Right-arm medium	2021	Post-draft signing
12	**Sohaib Maqsood**	Pakistan	15 April 1987 (aged 34)	Diamond	Right-handed	Right-arm off break	2021	
75	Taimoor Sultan	Pakistan	4 October 1994 (aged 26)	Emerging	Right-handed		2021	
N/A	**Tillakaratne Dilshan**	Sri Lanka	14 October 1976 (aged 44)	Overseas	Right-handed	Right-arm off break	2021	Overseas
All-rounders
8	**Mohammad Hafeez**	Pakistan	17 October 1980 (aged 40)	Icon	Right-handed	Right-arm off break	2021	Captain
17	Sohail Akhtar	Pakistan	2 March 1986 (aged 35)	Silver	Right-handed	Right-arm medium	2021	
33	**Sohail Tanvir**	Pakistan	12 December 1984 (aged 36)	Platinum	Left-handed	Left-arm medium-fast	2021	
48	**Anwar Ali**	Pakistan	25 November 1987 (aged 33)	Silver	Right-handed	Right-arm fast-medium	2021	
74	**Mohammad Wasim**	Pakistan	25 August 2001 (aged 19)	Diamond	Right-handed	Right-arm medium	2021	
88	Inzamam-ul-Haq	Pakistan	22 July 1997 (aged 23)	Emerging	Right-handed	Slow left arm orthodox	2021	
Wicket-keepers
60	Zeeshan Ashraf	Pakistan	11 May 1992 (aged 29)	Gold	Left-handed	Right-arm off break	2021	
Bowlers
9	Arsalan Arif	Pakistan	5 January 1993 (aged 28)	Emerging	Left-handed	Slow left-arm orthodox	2021	
10	Usama Mir	Pakistan	23 December 1995 (aged 25)	Silver	Right-handed	Right-arm leg break	2021	
32	**Arshad Iqbal**	Pakistan	26 December 2000 (aged 20)	Gold	Right-handed	Right-arm medium-fast	2021	
78	Usman Arshad	England	9 January 1993 (aged 28)	Emerging	Right-handed	Right-arm medium-fast	2021	
115	Usman Yousuf	Pakistan		Emerging	Right-handed	Leg break	2021	Post-draft signing
N/A	Tahir Hussain	Pakistan	20 December 2000 (aged 20)	Emerging	Left-handed	Right-arm fast-medium	2021	

== Season standings ==
=== Points table ===
Pos	Team	Pld	W	L	NR	Pts	NRR
1	Rawalakot Hawks (C)	5	3	1	1	7	0.228
2	Muzaffarabad Tigers (R)	5	3	2	0	6	0.530
3	Mirpur Royals (3rd)	5	3	2	0	6	−0.323
4	Overseas Warriors (4th)	5	2	3	0	4	−0.032
5	Bagh Stallions	5	2	3	0	4	−0.201
6	Kotli Lions	5	1	3	1	3	−0.107

Source: ESPNcricinfo
- Top 4 teams qualified for the playoffs
- Advanced to Qualifier
- Advanced to Eliminator 1

Notes:

- C = Champions;
- R = Runner-up;
- (x) = Position at the end of the tournament;

== League fixtures and results ==
Match 3
7 August 2021
19:30 (N)
Scorecard

Overseas Warriors; 153/8 (20 overs)	v	Muzaffarabad Tigers; 156/3 (17.2 overs)
Imad Wasim 34 (30); Usama Mir 3/18 (4 overs)		Sohail Akhtar 58* (24); Kamran Ghulam 2/32 (4 overs)

Muzaffarabad Tigers won by 7 wickets
Muzaffarabad Cricket Stadium, Muzaffarabad
Umpires: Imtiaz Iqbal (Pak) and Rashid Riaz (Pak)
Player of the match: Usama Mir (Muzaffarabad Tigers)

- Overseas Warriors won the toss and elected to bat.

Match 7
9 August 2021
19:30 (N)
Scorecard

Rawalakot Hawks; 175/7 (20 overs)	v	Muzaffarabad Tigers; 174/8 (20 overs)
Hussain Talat 47* (35); Mohammad Wasim 3/26 (4 overs)		Mohammad Hafeez 44 (31); Zaman Khan 3/27 (4 overs)

Rawalakot Hawks won by 1 run
Muzaffarabad Cricket Stadium, Muzaffarabad
Umpires: Asif Yaqoob (Pak) and Imtiaz Iqbal (Pak)
Player of the match: Hussain Talat (Rawalakot Hawks)

- Rawalakot Hawks won the toss and elected to bat
- Mohammad Wasim took the first-ever hat trick in KPL history.

Match 8
10 August 2021
14:00
Scorecard

Kotli Lions; 195/4 (20 overs)	v	Muzaffarabad Tigers; 196/5 (18.3 overs)
Asif Ali 67 (34); Mohammad Hafeez 1/10 (1 over)		Zeeshan Ashraf 107* (62); Akif Javed 2/46 (4 overs)

Muzaffarabad Tigers won by 5 wickets
Muzaffarabad Cricket Stadium, Muzaffarabad
Umpires: Ghaffar Kazmi (Pak) and Rashid Riaz (Pak)
Player of the match: Zeeshan Ashraf (Muzaffarabad Tigers)

- Kotli Lions won the toss and elected to bat
- Zeeshan Ashraf scored the first century in KPL history

Match 12
12 August 2021
10:30
Scorecard

Bagh Stallions; 213/4 (20 overs)	v	Muzaffarabad Tigers; 214/6 (18.4 overs)
Iftikhar Ahmed 86* (38); Mohammad Hafeez 2/24 (4 overs)		Sohaib Maqsood 59 (40); Aamir Sohail 2/37 (4 overs)

Muzaffarabad Tigers won by 4 wickets
Muzaffarabad Cricket Stadium, Muzaffarabad
Umpires: Mohammad Sajid (Pak) and Rashid Riaz (Pak)
Player of the match: Anwar Ali (Muzaffarabad Tigers)

- Muzaffarabad Tigers won the toss and elected to field

Match 15
13 August 2021
15:30 (N)
Scorecard

Muzaffarabad Tigers; 227/6 (20 overs)	v	Mirpur Royals; 231/5 (19.4 overs)
Mohammad Hafeez 110 (55); Salman Irshad 2/27 (4 overs)		Khushdil Shah 56* (22); Arsalan Arif 1/15 (2 overs)

Mirpur Royals won by 5 wickets
Muzaffarabad Cricket Stadium, Muzaffarabad
Umpires: Aleem Dar (Pak) and Faisal Afridi
Player of the match: Mohammad Hafeez (Muzaffarabad Tigers)

- Muzaffarabad Tigers won the toss and elected to field
- Mohammad Hafeez scored his first century in the KPL

== Playoffs ==
=== Qualifier ===
Match 16
14 August 2021
16:00 (N)
Scorecard

Muzaffarabad Tigers; 164/8 (20 overs)	v	Rawalakot Hawks; 157 (19.4 overs)
Anwar Ali 57 (34); Mohammad Imran 2/9 (2 overs)		Hussain Talat 52 (35); Sohail Tanvir 4/29 (4 overs)

Muzaffarabad Tigers won by 7 runs
Muzaffarabad Cricket Stadium, Muzaffarabad
Umpires: Aleem Dar (Pak) and Asif Yaqoob (Pak)
Player of the match: Anwar Ali (Muzaffarabad Tigers)

- Rawalakot Hawks won the toss and elected to field
- As a result of this match Muzaffarabad Tigers advanced to the final.
- As a result of this match Rawalakot Hawks advanced to eliminator 2.

=== Final ===
Match 19
17 August 2021
19:00 (N)
Scorecard

Rawalakot Hawks; 169/7 (20 overs)	v	Muzaffarabad Tigers; 162/9 (20 overs)
Kashif Ali 54 (29); Usama Mir 2/25 (4 overs)		Zeeshan Ashraf 46 (26); Hussain Talat 3/18 (4 overs)

Rawalakot Hawks won by 7 runs
Muzaffarabad Cricket Stadium, Muzaffarabad
Umpires: Ahsan Raza (Pak) and Aleem Dar (Pak)
Player of the match: Asif Afridi (Rawalakot Hawks)

- Muzaffarabad Tigers won the toss and elected to field
- Rawalakot Hawks won the 2021 KPL as a result of this match

== Statistics ==
=== Most runs ===
Nat.	Player	Matches	Innings	Runs	Average	HS	100	50
(Pakistan)	Zeeshan Ashraf	7	7	284	47.33	107	1	0
(Pakistan)	Mohammad Hafeez	7	7	194	27.71	110	1	0
(Pakistan)	Sohaib Maqsood	7	7	194	32.33	60	0	2
(Pakistan)	Anwar Ali	7	6	156	31.20	57	0	1
(Pakistan)	Sohail Akhtar	7	7	120	24.00	58	0	1

Source: Score360

=== Most wickets ===
Nat.	Player	Matches	Overs	Wickets	Average	BBI	4w	5w
(Pakistan)	Sohail Tanvir	7	27.0	8	37.12	4/29	1	0
(Pakistan)	Arshad Iqbal	7	26.4	8	31.38	2/35	0	0
(Pakistan)	Mohammad Hafeez	7	16.0	7	18.14	2/24	0	0
(Pakistan)	Usama Mir	6	21.0	7	24.14	3/18	0	0
(Pakistan)	Mohammad Wasim	7	28.0	6	44.00	3/26	0	0

Source: Score360
