= 2021 Kashmir Premier League (Pakistan) =

1st edition of the Kashmir Premier League

2021 Kashmir Premier league
- Dates: 6 August 2021 – 17 August 2021
- Administrator: Pakistan Cricket Board
- Cricket format: Twenty20
- Tournament format(s): Single round-robin and playoffs
- Host: Azad Kashmir
- Champions: Rawalakot Hawks (1st title)
- Runners-up: Muzaffarabad Tigers
- Participants: 6
- Matches: 19
- Player of the series: Hussain Talat (227 runs and 4 wickets)
- Most runs: Sharjeel Khan (296)
- Most wickets: Salman Irshad (16)
- Official website: kpl20.com

The 2021 Kashmir Premier League (also known as 2021 KPL or, for sponsorship reasons, SRG KPL 2021), was the inaugural season of the Kashmir Premier League which was established by the Pakistan Cricket Board. The tournament featured six teams and was held from 6 August 2021 to 17 August 2021 in Muzaffarabad, Azad Kashmir. The opening ceremony and first match of the tournament were held at the Muzaffarabad Stadium on 6 August 2021.

The final was held on 17 August and saw Rawalakot Hawks defeating Muzaffarabad Tigers by 8 runs to win the first title. Asif Afridi of Rawalakot Hawks was awarded the man of the match award for his bowling figures of 3/21.

== Franchises ==
Cities represented by KPL teams

Team	Owner	City	Captain	Coach
Bagh Stallions	Hameed Khan & Tauqir Sultan Awan	Bagh	Shan Masood	Abdul Rehman
Kotli Lions	Faisal Nadeem, Khalid Zia and Nasir Yousuf	Kotli	Kamran Akmal	Abdul Razzaq
Mirpur Royals	Adil Waheed & Suleman Raza	Mirpur	Shoaib Malik	Inzamam-ul-Haq
Muzaffarabad Tigers	Arshad Khan Tanoli	Muzaffarabad	Mohammad Hafeez	Mohtashim Rasheed
Overseas Warriors	Muhammad Zakir Ali	Kashmiri diaspora	Imad Wasim	Mushtaq Ahmed
Rawalakot Hawks	Jan Wali Shaheen	Rawalakot	Shahid Afridi	Arshad Khan

== Squads ==
Squads

Bagh Stallions	Kotli Lions	Mirpur Royals	Muzaffarabad Tigers	Overseas Warriors	Rawalakot Hawks
Shan Masood (c); ~~Shadab Khan~~ (Note: Centrally contracted players had to withdraw from the KPL due to the West Indies tour although those who weren’t chosen for the tour did participate in the KPL.); ~~Phil Mustard~~ (wk); Iftikhar Ahmed; Umaid Asif; Rohail Nazir (wk); Mohammad Ilyas; Mohammad Imran; Zeeshan Malik; Usman Mughal; Zeeshan Zameer; Furqan Shafique; Sufyan Moqeem; Mohammad Junaid; Amir Sohail	Kamran Akmal (c) (wk); ~~Fakhar Zaman~~; ~~Monty Panesar~~; Asif Ali; Usman Qadir; Imran Khan; Akif Javed; Khalid Usman; Irfanullah Shah; Junaid Ali; Abdullah Syed; Syed Hashim Ali; Hasan Raza; Yasir Jan; Abdul Rehman	Shoaib Malik (c); ~~Owais Shah~~; Sharjeel Khan; Khushdil Shah; Mohammad Irfan; Salman Irshad; Amad Butt; Mukhtar Ahmed; Abrar Ahmed; Muhammad Akhlaq (wk); Shadab Majeed; Danyal Allah Ditta; Muhammad Taha; Ibtesam-ul-Haq; Ammad Alam	Mohammad Hafeez (c); Tillakaratne Dilshan; Sohail Tanvir; Sohaib Maqsood; Mohammad Wasim; Arshad Iqbal; Zeeshan Ashraf (wk); Sohail Akhtar; Usama Mir; Anwar Ali; Arsalan Arif; Tahir Hussain; Inzamam-ul-Haq; Usman Arshad; Taimoor Sultan	Imad Wasim (c); Muhammad Musa; ~~Haris Sohail~~; Herschelle Gibbs; Haider Ali; Azam Khan (wk); Sohail Khan; Qasim Akram; Hammad Azam; Naveed Malik; Waleed Ahmed; Raza-ul-Mustafa; Abbas Afridi; Rashid Naseer; Uthman Ali Khan	Shahid Afridi (c); ~~Matt Prior~~ (wk); ~~Mohammad Hasnain~~; Hussain Talat; Ahmed Shehzad; Danish Aziz; Waqas Maqsood; Zafar Gohar; Bismillah Khan (wk); Imran Randhawa; Kashif Ali; Faisal Altaf; Zaman Khan; Samiullah Afridi; Shahid Ilyas

== Promotion in media ==
The league was promoted on social media by the hashtag #KheloAazadiSe (lit. play with freedom). The brand ambassador of the 2021 KPL was Shahid Afridi and the official singer was Rahat Fateh Ali Khan.

=== Anthem ===
The official anthem of the KPL, “The Aazadi Anthem” was released on 16 February 2021 and it was sung by Rahat Fateh Ali Khan.

=== Opening ceremony ===
The opening ceremony took place on the 6th of August 2021.

== Venue ==
The whole tournament took place in Muzaffarabad, Azad Kashmir. Around 2,500 spectators were allowed to watch the match in stadium due to COVID-19.

Muzaffarabad
Muzaffarabad Cricket Stadium
Capacity: 10,000
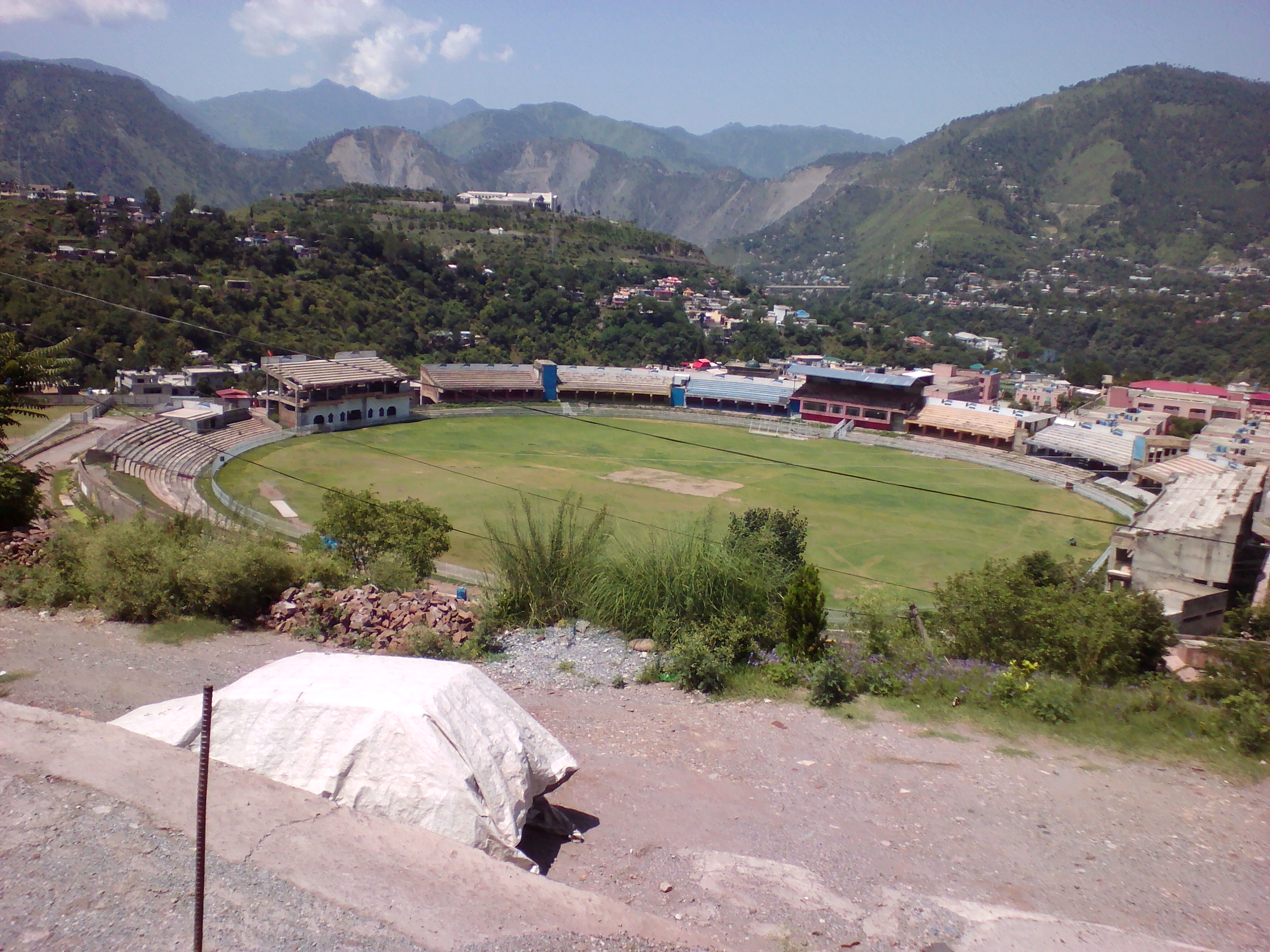

== Umpires ==
- Aleem Dar
- Ahsan Raza
- Asif Yaqoob
- Rashid Riaz
- Shozab Raza
- Faisal Afridi
- Ghaffar Kazmi
- Imtiaz Iqbal
- Ahmed Shahab
- Majid Hussain
- Mohammad Sajid

== League stage ==
=== Points table ===
Pos	Team	Pld	W	L	NR	Pts	NRR
1	Rawalakot Hawks (C)	5	3	1	1	7	0.228
2	Muzaffarabad Tigers (R)	5	3	2	0	6	0.530
3	Mirpur Royals (3rd)	5	3	2	0	6	−0.323
4	Overseas Warriors (4th)	5	2	3	0	4	−0.032
5	Bagh Stallions	5	2	3	0	4	−0.201
6	Kotli Lions	5	1	3	1	3	−0.107

Source: ESPNcricinfo
- Top 4 teams qualified for the playoffs
- Advanced to Qualifier
- Advanced to Eliminator 1

Notes:

- C = Champions;
- R = Runner-up;
- (x) = Position at the end of the tournament;

=== Summary ===
Against Team	Bagh Stallions	Kotli Lions	Mirpur Royals	Muzaffarabad Tigers	Overseas Warriors	Rawalakot Hawks
Bagh Stallions		Won by 5 wickets	Won by 15 runs	Lost by 4 wickets	Lost by 5 wickets	Lost by 5 wickets
Kotli Lions			Lost in Super Over	Lost by 5 wickets	Won by 8 wickets	Match Abandoned
Mirpur Royals				Won by 5 wickets	Won by 5 wickets	Lost by 43 runs
Muzaffarabad Tigers					Won by 7 wickets	Lost by 1 run
Overseas Warriors						Won by 7 wickets
Rawalakot Hawks						

=== League progression ===
League progression
Team	Group matches					Playoffs		
Team	1	2	3	4	5	Q1/E	Q2	F
Bagh Stallions	2	4	4	4	4			
Kotli Lions	0	1	1	1	3			
Mirpur Royals	0	0	2	4	6	W	L	
Muzaffarabad Tigers	2	2	4	6	6	W		L
Overseas Warriors	0	0	2	4	4	L		
Rawalakot Hawks	2	3	5	7	7	L	W	W

Win	Loss	No result

- Note: The total points at the end of each group match are listed.
- Note: Click on the points (group matches) or W/L (playoffs) to see the match summary.

=== Fixtures ===
The schedule for the tournament was announced on 2 August 2021. The matches from 12 August onwards were rescheduled due to the Pakistan vs West Indies test series as the timings coincided with each other.

Match 1
6 August 2021
20:30 (N)
Scorecard

Rawalakot Hawks; 194/6 (20 overs)	v	Mirpur Royals; 151/8 (20 overs)
Ahmed Shehzad 69 (42); Amad Butt 3/20 (4 overs)		Shoaib Malik 77 (51); Shahid Afridi 2/27 (4 overs)

Rawalakot Hawks won by 43 runs
Muzaffarabad Cricket Stadium, Muzaffarabad
Umpires: Ahsan Raza (Pak) and Asif Yaqoob (Pak)
Player of the match: Bismillah Khan (Rawalakot Hawks)

- Mirpur Royals won the toss and elected to field.

Match 2
7 August 2021
14:00
Scorecard

Kotli Lions; 169 (20 overs)	v	Bagh Stallions; 172/5 (19.4 overs)
Ahsan Ali 51 (37); Mohammad Imran 3/25 (4 overs)		Asad Shafiq 43* (27); Imran Khan 3/30 (4 overs)

Bagh Stallions won by 5 wickets
Muzaffarabad Cricket Stadium, Muzaffarabad
Umpires: Ahsan Raza (Pak) and Ahmed Shahab (Pak)
Player of the match: Ahsan Ali (Kotli Lions)

- Kotli Lions won the toss and elected to bat.

Match 3
7 August 2021
19:30 (N)
Scorecard

Overseas Warriors; 153/8 (20 overs)	v	Muzaffarabad Tigers; 156/3 (17.2 overs)
Imad Wasim 34 (30); Usama Mir 3/18 (4 overs)		Sohail Akhtar 58* (24); Kamran Ghulam 2/32 (4 overs)

Muzaffarabad Tigers won by 7 wickets
Muzaffarabad Cricket Stadium, Muzaffarabad
Umpires: Imtiaz Iqbal (Pak) and Rashid Riaz (Pak)
Player of the match: Usama Mir (Muzaffarabad Tigers)

- Overseas Warriors won the toss and elected to bat.

Match 4
8 August 2021
14:00
Scorecard

Bagh Stallions; 211/6 (20 overs)	v	Mirpur Royals; 196/8 (20 overs)
Shan Masood 78 (45); Salman Irshad 3/47 (4 overs)		Muhammad Akhlaq 68 (39); Mohammad Imran 2/33 (4 overs)

Bagh Stallions won by 15 runs
Muzaffarabad Cricket Stadium, Muzaffarabad
Umpires: Ahmed Shahab (Pak) and Shozab Raza (Pak)
Player of the match: Shan Masood (Bagh Stallions)

- Mirpur Royals won the toss and elected to field.

Match 5
8 August 2021
19:30 (N)
Scorecard

Rawalakot Hawks	v	Kotli Lions

Match Abandoned
Muzaffarabad Cricket Stadium, Muzaffarabad

Match 6
9 August 2021
14:00
Scorecard

Overseas Warriors; 145/6 (20 overs)	v	Mirpur Royals; 146/5 (18.1 overs)
Kamran Ghulam 47 (35); Salman Irshad 3/25 (4 overs)		Mukhtar Ahmed 45 (40); Muhammad Musa 3/27 (4 overs)

Mirpur Royals won by 5 wickets
Muzaffarabad Cricket Stadium, Muzaffarabad
Umpires: Ahsan Raza (Pak) and Ghaffar Kazmi (Pak)
Player of the match: Salman Irshad (Mirpur Royals)

- Overseas Warriors won the toss and elected to bat

Match 7
9 August 2021
19:30 (N)
Scorecard

Rawalakot Hawks; 175/7 (20 overs)	v	Muzaffarabad Tigers; 174/8 (20 overs)
Hussain Talat 47* (35); Mohammad Wasim 3/26 (4 overs)		Mohammad Hafeez 44 (31); Zaman Khan 3/27 (4 overs)

Rawalakot Hawks won by 1 run
Muzaffarabad Cricket Stadium, Muzaffarabad
Umpires: Asif Yaqoob (Pak) and Imtiaz Iqbal (Pak)
Player of the match: Hussain Talat (Rawalakot Hawks)

- Rawalakot Hawks won the toss and elected to bat
- Mohammad Wasim took the first hat trick in KPL history.

Match 8
10 August 2021
14:00
Scorecard

Kotli Lions; 195/4 (20 overs)	v	Muzaffarabad Tigers; 196/5 (18.3 overs)
Asif Ali 67 (34); Mohammad Hafeez 1/10 (1 over)		Zeeshan Ashraf 107* (62); Akif Javed 2/46 (4 overs)

Muzaffarabad Tigers won by 5 wickets
Muzaffarabad Cricket Stadium, Muzaffarabad
Umpires: Ghaffar Kazmi (Pak) and Rashid Riaz (Pak)
Player of the match: Zeeshan Ashraf (Muzaffarabad Tigers)

- Kotli Lions won the toss and elected to bat
- Zeeshan Ashraf scored the first century in KPL history

Match 9
10 August 2021
19:30 (N)
Scorecard

Bagh Stallions; 186/7 (20 overs)	v	Overseas Warriors; 190/5 (19.2 overs)
Shan Masood 73 (45); Abbas Afridi 2/44 (4 overs)		Haider Ali 91 (57); Aamer Yamin 2/31 (4 overs)

Overseas Warriors won by 5 wickets
Muzaffarabad Cricket Stadium, Muzaffarabad
Umpires: Faisal Afridi (Pak) and Shozab Raza (Pak)
Player of the match: Haider Ali (Overseas Warriors)

- Bagh Stallions won the toss and elected to bat

Match 10
11 August 2021
14:00
Scorecard

Bagh Stallions; 156/9 (20 overs)	v	Rawalakot Hawks; 157/5 (18.2 overs)
Aamer Yamin 69 (34); Zaman Khan 3/18 (4 overs)		Kashif Ali 54 (40); Umaid Asif 2/27 (3 overs)

Rawalakot Hawks won by 5 wickets
Muzaffarabad Cricket Stadium, Muzaffarabad
Umpires: Asif Yaqoob (Pak) and Mohammad Sajid (Pak)
Player of the match: Aamer Yamin (Bagh Stallions)

- Bagh Stallions won the toss and elected to bat

Match 11
11 August 2021
19:30 (N)
Scorecard

Mirpur Royals; 211/6 (20 overs)	v	Kotli Lions; 211/8 (20 overs)
Mukhtar Ahmed 61 (38); Mujtaba Ghayyas 2/23 (3 overs)		Ahsan Ali 99 (47); Salman Irshad 3/39 (4 overs)

Match Tied (Mirpur Royals won the Super Over)
Muzaffarabad Cricket Stadium, Muzaffarabad
Umpires: Ahmed Shahab (Pak) and Faisal Afridi (Pak)
Player of the match: Ahsan Ali (Kotli Lions)

- Kotli Lions won the toss and elected to field
- Super Over: Kotli Lions 2 all out, Mirpur Royals 4/0.

Match 12
12 August 2021
10:30
Scorecard

Bagh Stallions; 213/4 (20 overs)	v	Muzaffarabad Tigers; 214/6 (18.4 overs)
Iftikhar Ahmed 86* (38); Mohammad Hafeez 2/24 (4 overs)		Sohaib Maqsood 59 (40); Aamir Sohail 2/37 (4 overs)

Muzaffarabad Tigers won by 4 wickets
Muzaffarabad Cricket Stadium, Muzaffarabad
Umpires: Mohammad Sajid (Pak) and Rashid Riaz (Pak)
Player of the match: Anwar Ali (Muzaffarabad Tigers)

- Muzaffarabad Tigers won the toss and elected to field

Match 13
12 August 2021
15:30 (N)
Scorecard

Rawalakot Hawks; 145/9 (20 overs)	v	Overseas Warriors; 133/3 (13.1 overs)
Umar Amin 55 (42); Abbas Afridi 5/18 (4 overs)		Nasir Nawaz 56 (36); Asif Afridi 2/29 (4 overs)

Overseas Warriors won by 7 wickets (DLS method)
Muzaffarabad Cricket Stadium, Muzaffarabad
Umpires: Aleem Dar (Pak) and Majid Hussain (Pak)
Player of the match: Nasir Nawaz (Overseas Warriors)

- Overseas Warriors won the toss and elected to field
- Target reduced to 133 from 18 overs

Match 14
13 August 2021
10:30
Scorecard

Overseas Warriors; 211/6 (20 overs)	v	Kotli Lions; 215/2 (19 overs)
Nasir Nawaz 66 (44); Khurram Shahzad 3/39 (4 overs)		Kamran Akmal 60 (35); Faizan Saleem 1/15 (2 overs)

Kotli Lions won by 8 wickets
Muzaffarabad Cricket Stadium, Muzaffarabad
Player of the match: Kamran Akmal (Kotli Lions)

- Kotli Lions won the toss and elected to field

Match 15
13 August 2021
15:30 (N)
Scorecard

Muzaffarabad Tigers; 227/6 (20 overs)	v	Mirpur Royals; 231/5 (19.4 overs)
Mohammad Hafeez 110 (55); Salman Irshad 2/27 (4 overs)		Khushdil Shah 56* (22); Arsalan Arif 1/15 (2 overs)

Mirpur Royals won by 5 wickets
Muzaffarabad Cricket Stadium, Muzaffarabad
Umpires: Aleem Dar (Pak) and Faisal Afridi
Player of the match: Mohammad Hafeez (Muzaffarabad Tigers)

- Muzaffarabad Tigers won the toss and elected to field
- Mohammad Hafeez scored his first century in the KPL

== Playoffs ==
Semifinals
14 August — Muzaffarabad
2	Muzaffarabad Tigers	164/8 (20 overs)
1	Rawalakot Hawks	157 (19.4 overs)
15 August — Muzaffarabad
4	Overseas Warriors	160/9 (20 overs)
3	Mirpur Royals	162/6 (18.4 overs)

Preliminary final
16 August — Muzaffarabad
3	Mirpur Royals	236/4 (20 overs)
1	Rawalakot Hawks	237/6 (19.4 overs)

Final
17 August — Muzaffarabad
1	Rawalakot Hawks	169/7 (20 overs)
2	Muzaffarabad Tigers	162/9 (20 overs)

=== Preliminary ===
==== Qualifier ====
Match 16
14 August 2021
16:00 (N)
Scorecard

Muzaffarabad Tigers; 164/8 (20 overs)	v	Rawalakot Hawks; 157 (19.4 overs)
Anwar Ali 57 (34); Mohammad Imran 2/9 (2 overs)		Hussain Talat 52 (35); Sohail Tanvir 4/29 (4 overs)

Muzaffarabad Tigers won by 7 runs
Muzaffarabad Cricket Stadium, Muzaffarabad
Umpires: Aleem Dar (Pak) and Asif Yaqoob (Pak)
Player of the match: Anwar Ali (Muzaffarabad Tigers)

- Rawalakot Hawks won the toss and elected to field

==== Eliminator 1 ====
Match 17
15 August 2021
16:00 (N)
Scorecard

Overseas Warriors; 160/9 (20 overs)	v	Mirpur Royals; 162/6 (18.4 overs)
Agha Salman 59 (26); Shadab Majeed 4/45 (4 overs)		Sharjeel Khan 30 (17); Sohail Khan 2/23 (4 overs)

Mirpur Royals won by 4 wickets
Muzaffarabad Cricket Stadium, Muzaffarabad
Umpires: Aleem Dar (Pak) and Rashid Riaz (Pak)
Player of the match: Shadab Majeed (Mirpur Royals)

- Mirpur Royals won the toss and elected to field

==== Eliminator 2 ====
Match 18
16 August 2021
16:00 (N)
Scorecard

Mirpur Royals; 236/4 (20 overs)	v	Rawalakot Hawks; 237/6 (19.4 overs)
Sharjeel Khan 141 (63); Zaman Khan 2/18 (4 overs)		Kashif Ali 114* (51); Amad Butt 3/40 (4 overs)

Rawalakot Hawks won by 4 wickets
Muzaffarabad Cricket Stadium, Muzaffarabad
Umpires: Aleem Dar (Pak) and Asif Yaqoob (Pak)
Player of the match: Kashif Ali (Rawalakot Hawks)

- Rawalakot Hawks won the toss and elected to field
- Sharjeel Khan and Kashif Ali scored their first centuries in the KPL.

=== Final ===
Match 19
17 August 2021
19:00 (N)
Scorecard

Rawalakot Hawks; 169/7 (20 overs)	v	Muzaffarabad Tigers; 162/9 (20 overs)
Kashif Ali 54 (29); Usama Mir 2/25 (4 overs)		Zeeshan Ashraf 46 (26); Hussain Talat 3/18 (4 overs)

Rawalakot Hawks won by 7 runs
Muzaffarabad Cricket Stadium, Muzaffarabad
Umpires: Ahsan Raza (Pak) and Aleem Dar (Pak)
Player of the match: Asif Afridi (Rawalakot Hawks)

- Muzaffarabad Tigers won the toss and elected to field

== Statistics ==
=== Most runs ===
Player	Team	Matches	Runs	High score
Sharjeel Khan	Mirpur Royals	6	296	141
Zeeshan Ashraf	Muzaffarabad Tigers	7	284	107 not out
Shan Masood	Bagh Stallions	5	254	78
Kashif Ali	Rawalakot Hawks	7	242	114 not out
Shoaib Malik	Mirpur Royals	7	240	77

- Source: Cricinfo

=== Most wickets ===
Player	Team	Matches	Wickets	Best bowling
Salman Irshad	Mirpur Royals	7	16	3/25
Asif Afridi	Rawalakot Hawks	7	12	3/21
Amad Butt	Mirpur Royals	7	11	3/20
Zaman Khan	Rawalakot Hawks	6	10	3/18
Umaid Asif	Bagh Stallions	5	9	3/20

- Source: Cricinfo

== Awards ==
=== Individual awards ===
Name	Team	Award
Hussain Talat	Rawalakot Hawks	Player of the Tournament
Zeeshan Ashraf	Muzaffarabad Tigers	Best Batsman of the tournament
Asif Afridi	Rawalakot Hawks	Best Bowler of the tournament
Mohammad Wasim	Muzaffarabad Tigers	Best Fielder of the tournament
Bismillah Khan	Rawalakot Hawks	Best Wicket-keeper of the tournament
Salman Irshad	Mirpur Royals	Best Kashmiri of the tournament

=== Dream Team ===
Players
- Shan Masood
- Zeeshan Ashraf (wk)
- Ahsan Ali
- Kashif Ali
- Hussain Talat
- Anwar Ali
- Shahid Afridi (c)
- Mohammad Wasim
- Asif Afridi
- Salman Irshad
- Zaman Khan
- Arshad Iqbal (12th man)

== Controversies ==
On 31 July 2021, it was reported that foreign cricketers were requested by the Indian cricket board (BCCI) against taking part in the inaugural Kashmir Premier League (KPL) cricket tournament. Former Pakistani wicket keeper Rashid Latif tweeted that BCCI is warning other cricket boards that if their former players took part in Kashmir Premier League, they won't be allowed entry in India or allowed to work in Indian cricket at any level or in any capacity. Former South African cricketer Herschelle Gibbs, who played for the Overseas Warriors, also accused BCCI of pressuring him to not play in the KPL. The Pakistan cricket board (PCB) expressed displeasure at the reports that BCCI is trying to prevent players from joining the tournament and said that it would raise the issue with the relevant ICC forum. Responding to Gibbs and the PCB, the BCCI said that they are well within their rights to take decisions with respect to the cricketing ecosystem in India.

On 1 August 2021, former England spinner Monty Panesar pulled out of the tournament. He took to Twitter to reveal the news and said that, "I have decided not to participate in the KPL because of the political tensions between India and Pakistan over Kashmir issues. I don't want to be in the middle of this, it would make me feel uncomfortable." Panesar further said in an interview that "BCCI had 'advised' him that if he played in the event, the 'consequences' of his decision could include not being granted a visa to India in the future and not being allowed to work in the country."

On 2 August 2021, the BCCI urged ICC not to recognise the Kashmir Premier League due to the disputed nature of Kashmir region between India and Pakistan. In response, the ICC clarified that the tournament doesn't come under their jurisdiction as it is not an international tournament. The 2021 KPL received 15 million views within the first 5 matches and broke the record for Pakistan's most viewed live sports event launch on digital media. The President of the KPL, Arif Malik, said that the BCCI's efforts to stop the league only popularised it instead.

The KPL did not pay players for any player awards (e.g., man of the match) and end of the season awards. They later cleared all player related dues in June 2022.
