= 2021 Islamabad United season =

2021 season of Islamabad United

Islamabad United
2021 season
- Coach: Johan Botha
- Captain: Shadab Khan
- PSL 2021: Play-offs (3rd)
- Most runs: Colin Munro (285)
- Most wickets: Hasan Ali (13)

Islamabad United is a franchise cricket team that represents Islamabad in the Pakistan Super League (PSL). They were one of the six teams that competed in the 2021 PSL season and finished in the third place. The team was coached by Johan Botha, and captained by Shadab Khan.

== Squad ==
Key
Name
- Players with international caps are listed in **bold**.
- * denotes a player who is fully unavailable
- * denotes a player who will be partially unavailable

No.	Name	Nationality	Birth date	Batting style	Bowing style	Year signed	Notes
Batsmen
1	**Paul Stirling**	Ireland	3 September 1990 (aged 30)	Right-handed	Right-arm off break	2021	Overseas
10	**Alex Hales**	England	3 January 1989 (aged 32)	Right-handed	Right-arm medium	2021	Overseas
45	**Asif Ali**	Pakistan	1 October 1991 (aged 29)	Right-handed	Right-arm off break	2016	
53	**Brandon King**	Jamaica	16 December 1994 (aged 26)	Right-handed	–	2021	Overseas; Replacement pick
82	**Colin Munro**	New Zealand	11 March 1987 (aged 33)	Left-handed	Right-arm Medium	2020	Overseas
95	**Iftikhar Ahmed**	Pakistan	3 September 1990 (aged 30)	Right-handed	Right-arm off break	2021	
99	**Usman Khawaja**	Australia	18 December 1986 (aged 34)	Left-handed	Right-arm medium	2021	Overseas; Replacement pick
—N/a	**Janneman Malan**	South Africa	18 April 1996 (aged 24)	Right-handed	Right-arm leg break	2021	Overseas; Replacement pick
All-rounders
7	**Shadab Khan**	Pakistan	4 October 1998 (aged 22)	Right-handed	Right-arm leg break	2017	Captain
12	**Hussain Talat**	Pakistan	12 February 1996 (aged 25)	Left-handed	Right-arm medium	2016	
20	**Umar Amin**	Pakistan	16 October 1989 (aged 31)	Left-handed	Right-arm medium	2021	Replacement pick
22	Mohammad Wasim	Pakistan	25 August 2001 (aged 19)	Right-handed	Right-arm medium fast	2021	
24	**Lewis Gregory**	England	24 May 1992 (aged 28)	Right-handed	Right-arm fast medium	2021	Overseas
41	**Faheem Ashraf**	Pakistan	16 January 1994 (aged 27)	Left-handed	Right-arm fast medium	2018	
Wicket-keepers
28	Phil Salt	England	28 August 1996 (aged 24)	Right-handed	Right-arm medium	2021	Overseas
44	Rohail Nazir	Pakistan	10 October 2001 (aged 19)	Right-handed	-	2021	
61	Muhammad Akhlaq	Pakistan	12 November 1992 (aged 28)	Right-handed	Right-arm medium	2021	Replacement pick
Bowlers
14	**Muhammad Musa**	Pakistan	28 August 2000 (aged 20)	Right-handed	Right-arm medium fast	2019	
17	**Zafar Gohar**	Pakistan	1 February 1995 (aged 26)	Left-handed	Slow left-arm orthodox	2018	
30	Zeeshan Zameer	Pakistan	10 August 2002 (aged 18)	Right-handed	Right-arm medium fast	2021	
32	**Hasan Ali**	Pakistan	2 July 1994 (aged 26)	Right-handed	Right-arm medium fast	2021	Vice Captain
34	**Chris Jordan**	England	4 October 1988 (aged 32)	Right-handed	Right-arm fast medium	2021	Overseas
47	**Ali Khan**	United States	13 December 1990 (aged 30)	Right-handed	Right-arm medium fast	2021	Overseas
52	**Fawad Ahmed**	Australia	5 February 1982 (aged 39)	Right-handed	Right-arm leg break	2021	Overseas
88	Akif Javed	Pakistan	10 October 2000 (aged 20)	Right-handed	Left-arm medium fast	2021	
92	Ahmed Safi Abdullah	Pakistan	1 March 1998 (aged 22)	Left-handed	slow left-arm orthodox	2021	
—N/a	**Reece Topley**	England	21 May 1994 (aged 26)	Right-handed	Left-arm medium fast	2021	Overseas

== Administration and support staff ==
Name	Position
Rehan Ul Haq	General Manager
Johan Botha	Head coach
Saeed Ajmal	Assistant coach
Rumman Raees	Bowling Coach
Corey Rutgers	Fielding Coach & Fitness Trainer
Errol Alcott	Physiotherapist
Hassan Cheema	Strategy Manager

== Kit manufacturers and sponsors ==
Shirt sponsor (chest)	Shirt sponsor (back)	Chest branding	Sleeve branding
Sabroso	Fast Cables	Ufone	Snack Video, Tetra Pak

Home kit

Away kit

== Points table ==
Pos	Team	Pld	W	L	NR	Pts	NRR
1	Islamabad United (3rd)	10	8	2	0	16	0.859
2	Multan Sultans (C)	10	5	5	0	10	1.050
3	Peshawar Zalmi (R)	10	5	5	0	10	0.586
4	Karachi Kings (4th)	10	5	5	0	10	−0.115
5	Lahore Qalandars	10	5	5	0	10	−0.589
6	Quetta Gladiators	10	2	8	0	4	−1.786

Source: ESPNcricinfo
- The top 4 teams qualified for the playoffs
- advanced to Qualifier
- advanced to Eliminator 1

== Group fixtures ==
Match 3
21 February 2021
19:00 (N)
Scorecard

Multan Sultans; 150/8 (20 overs)	v	Islamabad United; 151/7 (19 overs)
Mohammad Rizwan 71 (53); Mohammad Wasim 3/29 (4 overs)		Lewis Gregory 49* (31); Carlos Brathwaite 2/23 (4 overs)

Islamabad United won by 3 wickets
National Stadium, Karachi
Umpires: Richard Illingworth (Eng) and Ahsan Raza (Pak)
Player of the match: Lewis Gregory (Islamabad United)

- Islamabad United won the toss and elected to field.

Match 6
24 February 2021
19:00 (N)
Scorecard

(H) Karachi Kings; 196/3 (20 overs)	v	Islamabad United; 197/5 (19.1 overs)
Sharjeel Khan 105 (59); Hussain Talat 1/25 (2 overs)		Iftikhar Ahmed 49* (37); Waqas Maqsood 1/22 (2.1 overs)

Islamabad United won by 5 wickets
National Stadium, Karachi
Umpires: Aleem Dar (Pak) and Rashid Riaz (Pak)
Player of the match: Alex Hales (Islamabad United)

- Islamabad United won the toss and elected to field.

Match 10
27 February 2021
19:00 (N)
Scorecard

Islamabad United; 118 (17.1 overs)	v	Peshawar Zalmi; 122/4 (17.1 overs)
Alex Hales 41 (27); Wahab Riaz 4/17 (4 overs)		Tom Kohler-Cadmore 46 (46); Hasan Ali 2/14 (4 overs)

Peshawar Zalmi won by 6 wickets
National Stadium, Karachi
Umpires: Shozab Raza (Pak) and Asif Yaqoob (Pak)
Player of the match: Wahab Riaz (Peshawar Zalmi)

- Peshawar Zalmi won the toss and elected to field.

Match 12
1−2 March 2021
19:00 (N)
Scorecard

Quetta Gladiators; 156/7 (20 overs)	v	Islamabad United; 157/4 (17 overs)
Sarfaraz Ahmed 54 (41); Faheem Ashraf 3/11 (4 overs)		Paul Stirling 56 (33); Zahid Mahmood 2/29 (4 overs)

Islamabad United won by 6 wickets
National Stadium, Karachi
Umpires: Ahsan Raza (Pak) and Shozab Raza (Pak)
Player of the match: Faheem Ashraf (Islamabad United)

- Islamabad United won the toss and elected to field.
- The match was postponed for one day due to Fawad Ahmed testing Positive for COVID-19.

Match 15
9 June 2021
21:00 (N)
Scorecard

Islamabad United; 143/9 (20 overs)	v	Lahore Qalandars; 144/5 (20 overs)
Faheem Ashraf 27 (24); James Faulkner 3/32 (4 overs)		Sohail Akhtar 40 (30); Hasan Ali 2/27 (4 overs)

Lahore Qalandars won by 5 wickets
Sheikh Zayed Cricket Stadium, Abu Dhabi
Umpires: Aleem Dar (Pak) and Rashid Riaz (Pak)
Player of the match: Rashid Khan (Lahore Qalandars)

- Lahore Qalandars won the toss and elected to field.

Match 18
11 June 2021
21:00 (N)
Scorecard

Quetta Gladiators; 133 (20 overs)	v	Islamabad United; 137/0 (10 overs)
Jake Weatherald 43 (35); Mohammad Wasim 2/12 (4 overs)		Colin Munro 90* (36)

Islamabad United won by 10 wickets
Sheikh Zayed Cricket Stadium, Abu Dhabi
Umpires: Aleem Dar (Pak) and Shozab Raza (Pak)
Player of the match: Colin Munro (Islamabad United)

- Islamabad United won the toss and elected to field.
- Naseem Shah replaced Andre Russell as a concussion substitute for Quetta Gladiators.

Match 20
13 June 2021
18:00 (D/N)
Scorecard

Islamabad United; 152/7 (20 overs)	v	Lahore Qalandars; 124 (18.2 overs)
Asif Ali 75 (43); James Faulkner 3/19 (4 overs)		Fakhar Zaman 44 (37); Muhammad Musa 3/18 (3 overs)

Islamabad United won by 28 runs
Sheikh Zayed Cricket Stadium, Abu Dhabi
Umpires: Shozab Raza (Pak) and Asif Yaqoob (Pak)
Player of the match: Asif Ali (Islamabad United)

- Islamabad United won the toss and elected to bat.

Match 22
14 June 2021
21:00 (N)
Scorecard

Karachi Kings; 190/4 (20 overs)	v	Islamabad United; 191/2 (18.4 overs)
Babar Azam 81 (54); Akif Javed 1/31 (4 overs); Hasan Ali 1/31 (4 overs)		Colin Munro 88* (56); Waqas Maqsood 1/27 (4 overs)

Islamabad United won by 8 wickets
Sheikh Zayed Cricket Stadium, Abu Dhabi
Umpires: Rashid Riaz (Pak) and Asif Yaqoob (Pak)
Player of the match: Iftikhar Ahmed (Islamabad United)

- Islamabad United won the toss and elected to field.

Match 26
17 June 2021
18:00 (D/N)
Scorecard

Islamabad United; 247/2 (20 overs)	v	Peshawar Zalmi; 232/6 (20 overs)
Usman Khawaja 105* (56); Shoaib Malik 1/14 (2 overs)		Shoaib Malik 68 (36); Akif Javed 3/43 (4 overs)

Islamabad United won by 15 runs
Sheikh Zayed Cricket Stadium, Abu Dhabi
Umpires: Shozab Raza (Pak) and Rashid Riaz (Pak)
Player of the match: Usman Khawaja (Islamabad United)

- Peshawar Zalmi won the toss and elected to field.

Match 30
19 June 2021
23:00 (N)
Scorecard

Multan Sultans; 149 (20 overs)	v	Islamabad United; 150/6 (19.4 overs)
Shan Masood 59 (37); Mohammad Wasim 4/31 (4 overs)		Shadab Khan 35 (27); Shahnawaz Dahani 2/21 (4 overs)

Islamabad United won by 4 wickets
Sheikh Zayed Cricket Stadium, Abu Dhabi
Umpires: Aleem Dar (Pak) and Rashid Riaz (Pak)
Player of the match: Mohammad Wasim (Islamabad United)

- Islamabad United won the toss and elected to field.

== Playoffs ==
=== Qualifier ===
Match 31
21 June 2021
18:00 (D/N)
Scorecard

Multan Sultans; 180/5 (20 overs)	v	Islamabad United; 149 (19 Overs)
Sohaib Maqsood 59 (41); Shadab Khan 2/25 (4 overs)		Usman Khawaja 70 (40); Sohail Tanvir 3/17 (4 overs)

Multan Sultans won by 31 runs
Sheikh Zayed Cricket Stadium, Abu Dhabi
Umpires: Ahsan Raza (Pak) and Rashid Riaz (Pak)
Player of the match: Sohail Tanvir (Multan Sultans)

- Multan Sultans won the toss and elected to bat.

=== Eliminator 2 ===
Match 33
22 June 2021
21:00 (N)
Scorecard

Islamabad United; 174/9 (20 overs)	v	Peshawar Zalmi; 177/2 (16.5 overs)
Hasan Ali 45 (16); Wahab Riaz 2/35 (4 overs)		Hazratullah Zazai 66 (44); Mohammad Wasim 1/32 (3 overs)

Peshawar Zalmi won by 8 wickets
Sheikh Zayed Cricket Stadium, Abu Dhabi
Umpires: Aleem Dar (Pak) and Asif Yaqoob (Pak)
Player of the match: Hazratullah Zazai (Peshawar Zalmi)

- Peshawar Zalmi won the toss and elected to field.

== Statistics ==
=== Most runs ===
Player	Innings	Runs	Batting average	High score	50s	100s
Colin Munro	7	285	57.00	90*	2	0
Usman Khawaja	7	246	49.20	105*	1	1
Asif Ali	10	224	36.83	75*	1	0
Iftikhar Ahmed	9	221	23.50	71*	1	0
Hussain Talat	8	156	22.28	42	0	0
Source: ESPNcricinfo

=== Most wickets ===
Player	Innings	Wickets	Bowling average	Best bowling
Hasan Ali	10	13	20.69	2/14
Mohammad Wasim	11	12	28.00	4/31
Faheem Ashraf	8	9	21.11	3/11
Shadab Khan	11	9	36.11	2/14
Akif Javed	5	6	26.66	3/43
Source: ESPNcricinfo
