= 2021 Kashmir Premier League (Pakistan) final =

Final of the 2021 Kashmir Premier League

2021 Kashmir Premier League Final
- Event: 2021 Kashmir Premier League
Rawalakot Hawks	Muzaffarabad Tigers
169/7	162/9
20 overs	20 overs
- Rawalakot Hawks won by 7 runs
- Date: 17 August 2021
- Venue: Muzaffarabad Cricket Stadium, Muzaffarabad
- Player of the match: Asif Afridi (Rawalakot Hawks)
- Umpires: Aleem Dar; Ahsan Raza
- Attendance: 10,000

The 2021 Kashmir Premier League Final was a 20-over cricket match played on 17 August 2021, at Muzaffarabad Cricket Stadium, Muzaffarabad between Muzaffarabad Tigers and Rawalakot Hawks to determine the winner of the 2021 edition of the Kashmir Premier League.

== Route to the final ==
During the group stage of the 2021 Kashmir Premier League (KPL) each team played 5 matches, one against each of the other sides contesting the competition. All the matches took place in Muzaffarabad Cricket Stadium. The format for the group stages was single round-robin. This meant that all teams would face each other once. The teams needed to finish in the top 4 to qualify for the playoffs. Rawalakot Hawks finished 1st and Muzaffarabad Tigers finished 2nd in the group stages. Both teams won three matches but Muzaffarabad lost two matches and Rawalakot lost one match and had one match end in no result which earned them one point and meant that they finished 1st in the group stage.

League progression
Team	Group matches					Playoffs		
Team	1	2	3	4	5	Q1/E	Q2	F
Muzaffarabad Tigers	2	2	4	6	6	W		L
Rawalakot Hawks	2	3	5	7	7	L	W	W

Win	Loss	No result

- Note: The total points at the end of each group match are listed.
- Note: Click on the points (group matches) or W/L (playoffs) to see the match summary.

=== Group stage match ===
The two teams played each other once in the group stage of the 2021 KPL. The match was held on 9 August in Muzaffarabad. Rawalakot batted first, scoring 175/7 in 20 overs. Muzaffarabad scored 174/8 in 20 overs and this resulted in a 1 run victory for Rawalakot Hawks.

9 August 2021 (D/N)
Scorecard

Rawalakot Hawks; 175/7 (20 overs)	v	Muzaffarabad Tigers; 174/8 (20 overs)

Rawalakot Hawks won by 1 run
Muzaffarabad Cricket Stadium, Muzaffarabad

=== Playoff matches ===
Rawalakot and Muzaffarabad met in the qualifier match due to their respective positions. The winner automatically qualified for the final of the KPL. The match took place in Muzaffarabad on 14 August 2021. Muzaffarabad batted first and scored 164/8 in 20 overs. Rawalakot Hawks were bowled out for 157 in 19.4 overs which meant that Muzaffarabad defeated Rawalakot by 7 runs and that Muzaffarabad had qualified for the final.

==== Qualifier ====
14 August 2021 (D/N)
Scorecard

Muzaffarabad Tigers; 164/8 (20 overs)	v	Rawalakot Hawks; 157 (19.4 overs)

Muzaffarabad Tigers won by 7 runs
Muzaffarabad Cricket Stadium, Muzaffarabad

===== Eliminator 1 =====
15 August 2021 (D/N)
Scorecard

Overseas Warriors; 160/9 (20 overs)	v	Mirpur Royals; 162/6 (18.4 overs)

Mirpur Royals won by 4 wickets
Muzaffarabad Cricket Stadium, Muzaffarabad

===== Eliminator 2 =====
16 August 2021 (D/N)
Scorecard

Mirpur Royals; 236/4 (20 overs)	v	Rawalakot Hawks; 237/6 (19.4 overs)

Rawalakot Hawks won by 4 wickets
Muzaffarabad Cricket Stadium, Muzaffarabad

== Match ==
The final match was played between Muzaffarabad Tigers and Rawalakot Hawks in Muzaffarabad Cricket Stadium, Muzaffarabad, Azad Kashmir.

=== Summary ===
Muzaffarabad Tigers won the toss and elected to field first. In the first innings, Rawalakot's openers Bismillah Khan and Umar Amin managed a partnership of 53 runs before Mohammad Hafeez got Amin out for a score of 23 at 6.3 overs by LBW. Khan fell soon after that, getting caught by Sohail Akhtar on Usama Mir’s delivery at 7.1 overs and scored 30 runs. Hussain Talat didn't last long either, getting caught by Anwar Ali on Hafeez's delivery at 8.5 overs and only managing to get 5 runs. Kashif Ali and Sahibzada Farhan got a partnership of 36 runs before Sahibzada Farhan got bowled for 28 by Arshad Iqbal. Danish Aziz didn't stand his ground either as he got bowled by Usama Mir for a score of 4. Kashif Ali and Mohammad Imran steadied the innings with a partnership of 47 runs in which Kashif Ali completed his quick fire fifty. Kashif Ali got caught by Sohaib Maqsood on Mohammad Wasim’s delivery at 18.2 overs which put an end to his innings of 54 runs. Asif Afridi then got run out by Inzamam-ul-Haq at 19.3 overs after scoring only 6 runs. Rawalakot’s innings ended at 169/7.

Muzaffarabad got off to a strong start with Zeeshan Ashraf and Mohammad Hafeez getting a partnership of 54 runs before Hafeez fell for a score of 25 after he got caught by Sahibzada Farhan on Asif Afridi’s delivery at 5.2 overs. Zeeshan Ashraf got out for a score of 46 after he got bowled by Shahid Afridi at 8.5 overs. Sohaib Maqsood got out soon afterwards after scoring 15 runs when he was bowled by Shahid Afridi at 10.1 overs. Sohail Akhtar didn’t last long as he got bowled by Hussain Talat at the start of the 11th over and scored only 2 runs. Anwar Ali got out for only 7 as he was caught by Mohammad Imran on Hussain Talat’s delivery at 15.4 overs. Sohail Tanvir was eventually caught by Sahibzada Farhan on Hussain Talat’s delivery at 17.4 overs after scoring 21 runs. Mohammad Wasim and Inzamam-ul-Haq scored 17 runs in the 19th over which brought the required runs down from 27 to 10. In the last over, which was bowled by Asif Afridi, Inzamam got bowled for a score of 12 runs at 19.2 overs, Usama Mir got stumped for a duck at 19.4 overs and finally Mohammad Wasim got run out at 19.5 overs. This led to Rawalakot Hawks winning the inaugural KPL by defeating Muzaffarabad Tigers by 7 runs.

== Scorecard ==
Notes:

- † indicates team captain
- * indicates not out

Toss: Muzaffarabad Tigers won the toss and elected to field.

Rawalakot Hawks innings
Player	Status	Runs	Balls	4s	6s	Strike rate
Bismillah Khan	c Sohail Akhtar b Mir	30	19	4	1	157.90
Umar Amin	lbw †Mohammad Hafeez	23	23	2	1	100.00
Sahibzada Farhan	b Arshad Iqbal	28	21	1	2	133.33
Hussain Talat	c Anwar Ali b †Mohammad Hafeez	5	7	0	0	71.43
Kashif Ali	c Sohaib Maqsood b Wasim	54	28	5	3	192.86
Danish Aziz	b Mir	4	5	0	0	80.00
Mohammad Imran	*	17	12	2	0	141.67
Asif Afridi	run out (Inzamam-ul-Haq)	6	4	1	0	150.00
Mohammad Irfan	*	1	1	0	0	100.00
†Shahid Afridi	did not bat					
Zaman Khan	did not bat					
Extras (b 4); Total 169/7 (20 overs)				15	7	8.45 RR

Fall of wickets: 53/1 (Umar Amin, 6.4 ov), 53/2 (Bismillah Khan, 7.2 ov), 61/3 (Hussain Talat, 8.6 ov), 97/4 (Sahibzada Farhan, 13.1 ov), 110/5 (Danish Aziz, 14.6 ov), 157/6 (Kashif Ali, 18.3 ov), 168/7 (Asif Afridi, 19.3 ov)

Muzaffarabad Tigers bowling
Bowler	Overs	Maidens	Runs	Wickets	Econ	Wides	NBs
Mohammad Hafeez	3	0	26	2	8.67	0	0
Sohail Tanvir	3	0	32	0	10.67	0	0
Mohammad Wasim	4	0	36	1	7.75	0	0
Arshad Iqbal	4	0	27	1	6.75	0	0
Usama Mir	4	0	25	2	6.25	0	0
Inzamam-ul-Haq	2	0	22	0	11.00	0	0

Target: 170 runs from 20 overs at 8.50 RR

Muzaffarabad Tigers innings
Player	Status	Runs	Balls	4s	6s	Strike rate
Zeeshan Ashraf	b †Shahid Afridi	46	26	4	4	176.92
†Mohammad Hafeez	c Sahibzada Farhan b Asif Afridi	29	21	6	0	138.10
Sohaib Maqsood	b †Shahid Afridi	15	13	2	0	115.39
Sohail Akhtar	b Talat	2	6	0	0	33.33
Sohail Tanvir	c Sahibzada Farhan b Talat	21	20	2	0	105.00
Anwar Ali	c Mohammad Imran b Talat	7	14	0	0	50.00
Mohammad Wasim	run out (Bismillah Khan)	22	12	1	2	183.33
Inzamam-ul-Haq	b Asif Afridi	12	5	1	1	240.00
Usama Mir	st Bismillah Khan b Asif Afridi	0	2	0	0	00.00
Arshad Iqbal	*	1	2	0	0	50.00
Usman Arshad	*	0	0	0	0	0.00
Extras (lb 6, nb 1, w 5); Total 162/9 (20 overs)				16	7	8.10 RR

Fall of wickets: 54/1 (Mohammad Hafeez, 5.4 ov), 88/2 (Zeeshan Ashraf, 8.6 ov), 96/3 (Sohaib Maqsood, 10.3 ov), 97/4 (Sohail Akhtar, 11.1 ov), 122/5 (Anwar Ali, 15.5 ov), 142/6 (Sohail Tanvir, 17.5 ov), 161/7 (Inzamam-ul-Haq, 19.2 ov), 161/8 (Usama Mir, 19.4 ov), 161/9 (Mohammad Wasim, 19.5 ov)

Rawalakot Hawks bowling
Bowler	Overs	Maidens	Runs	Wickets	Econ	Wides	NBs
Zaman Khan	3	0	37	0	12.33	2	0
Mohammad Imran	1	0	6	0	6.00	2	0
Mohammad Irfan	4	0	41	0	10.25	0	1
Asif Afridi	4	0	21	3	5.25	0	0
Shahid Afridi	4	0	32	2	8.00	0	0
Hussain Talat	4	0	18	3	4.50	1	0

Result: Rawalakot Hawks won by 7 runs.

== Match Officials ==
On field Umpire: (Pakistan) Aleem Dar

On field Umpire: (Pakistan) Ahsan Raza

TV Umpire: (Pakistan) Asif Yaqoob

Reserve Umpire: (Pakistan) Rashid Riaz

Match Referee: (Pakistan) Ali Naqvi
