= South African cricket team in Pakistan in 2025–26 =

International cricket tour

	Pakistan	South Africa
- Dates: 12 October – 8 November 2025
Captains	Shan Masood (Tests); Shaheen Afridi (ODIs); Salman Ali Agha (T20Is)	Aiden Markram (Tests); Matthew Breetzke (ODIs); Donovan Ferreira (T20Is)

Test series
- Result: 2-match series drawn 1–1
Most runs	Salman Ali Agha (170); Shan Masood (170)	Tony de Zorzi (175)
Most wickets	Noman Ali (14)	Simon Harmer (13)
- Player of the series: Senuran Muthusamy (SA)

One Day International series
- Results: Pakistan won the 3-match series 2–1
Most runs	Saim Ayub (169)	Quinton de Kock (239)
Most wickets	Abrar Ahmed (7)	Nandre Burger (5)
- Player of the series: Quinton de Kock (SA)

Twenty20 International series
- Results: Pakistan won the 3-match series 2–1
Most runs	Saim Ayub (108)	Reeza Hendricks (94)
Most wickets	Faheem Ashraf (6)	Corbin Bosch (7)
- Player of the series: Faheem Ashraf (Pak)

The South Africa cricket team toured Pakistan in October and November 2025 to play the Pakistan cricket team. The tour consisted of two Test, three One Day International (ODI) and three Twenty20 Internationals (T20I) matches. The Test series formed part of the 2025–2027 ICC World Test Championship. In September 2025, the Pakistan Cricket Board (PCB) confirmed the fixtures for the tour.

== Squads ==
Pakistan			South Africa		
Tests	ODIs	T20Is	Tests	ODIs	T20Is
Shan Masood (c); Abrar Ahmed; Asif Afridi; Shaheen Afridi; Salman Ali Agha; Hasan Ali; Noman Ali; Faisal Akram; Babar Azam; Kamran Ghulam; Aamir Jamal; Sajid Khan; Rohail Nazir (wk); Mohammad Rizwan (wk); Khurram Shahzad; Abdullah Shafique; Saud Shakeel; Imam-ul-Haq	Shaheen Afridi (c); Salman Ali Agha; Abrar Ahmed; Faisal Akram; Faheem Ashraf; Saim Ayub; Babar Azam; Haseebullah Khan; Hassan Nawaz; Mohammad Nawaz; Haris Rauf; Mohammad Rizwan (wk); Naseem Shah; Hussain Talat; Mohammad Wasim Jr.; Fakhar Zaman	Salman Ali Agha (c); Shaheen Afridi; Abrar Ahmed; Faheem Ashraf; Saim Ayub; Babar Azam; Sahibzada Farhan; Usman Khan (wk); Salman Mirza; Hassan Nawaz; Mohammad Nawaz; Abdul Samad; Naseem Shah; Usman Tariq; Mohammad Wasim Jr.	Aiden Markram (c); David Bedingham; Corbin Bosch; Dewald Brevis; Tony de Zorzi; Zubayr Hamza; Simon Harmer; Marco Jansen; Keshav Maharaj (Note: In squad for second Test only.); Wiaan Mulder; Senuran Muthusamy; Kagiso Rabada; Ryan Rickelton (wk); Tristan Stubbs; Prenelan Subrayen; Kyle Verreynne (wk)	Matthew Breetzke (c); Ottniel Baartman; Corbin Bosch; ~~Dewald Brevis~~; Nandre Burger; ~~Gerald Coetzee~~; Quinton de Kock (wk); Tony de Zorzi; Donovan Ferreira; Bjorn Fortuin; Rubin Hermann; George Linde; ~~Kwena Maphaka~~; Lungi Ngidi; Nqaba Peter; Lhuan-dre Pretorius (wk); Sinethemba Qeshile; Lizaad Williams	Donovan Ferreira (c); ~~David Miller (c)~~; Ottniel Baartman; Corbin Bosch; Matthew Breetzke (wk); Dewald Brevis; Nandre Burger; ~~Gerald Coetzee~~; Tony de Zorzi; Quinton de Kock (wk); Reeza Hendricks; George Linde; ~~Kwena Maphaka~~; Lungi Ngidi; Nqaba Peter; Lhuan-dre Pretorius (wk); Andile Simelane; Lizaad Williams

On 9th October, Kwena Maphaka was ruled out of the tour due to hamstring injury and replaced by Ottniel Baartman in the T20I squad and by Lizaad Williams in the ODI squad. On 23 October, David Miller (hamstring strain) and Gerald Coetzee (pectoral muscle injury) were ruled out of the ODI and T20I squads and were replaced by Tony de Zorzi and Matthew Breetzke in T20Is and Ottniel Baartman in ODIs. Donovan Ferreira was named as the captain for the T20I series. On 4 November, Dewald Brevis was ruled out of the ODI series with a low-grade shoulder muscle strain. On 6 November, Rubin Hermann was added to the ODI squad as a replacement of Brevis.

== Test series ==
=== 1st Test ===
12–15 October 2025
Scorecard

Pakistan	v	South Africa
378 (110.4 overs); Salman Ali Agha 93 (145); Senuran Muthusamy 6/117 (32 overs)		269 (84 overs); Tony de Zorzi 104 (171); Noman Ali 6/112 (35 overs)
167 (46.1 overs); Babar Azam 42 (72); Senuran Muthusamy 5/57 (17 overs)		183 (60.5 overs); Dewald Brevis 54 (54); Shaheen Shah Afridi 4/33 (8.5 overs)

Pakistan won by 93 runs
Gaddafi Stadium, Lahore
Umpires: Chris Brown (NZ) and Rod Tucker (Aus)
Player of the match: Noman Ali (Pak)

- Pakistan won the toss and elected to bat.
- Senuran Muthusamy (SA) took his first five-wicket haul and first ten-wicket haul in Tests.
- Aiden Markram (SA) scored his 3,000th run in Tests.
- Rod Tucker set the Australian record for the most number of Test matches umpired with 96.
- World Test Championship points: Pakistan 12, South Africa 0.

=== 2nd Test ===
20–23 October 2025
Scorecard

Pakistan	v	South Africa
333 (113.4 overs); Shan Masood 87 (176); Keshav Maharaj 7/102 (42.4 overs)		404 (119.3 overs); Senuran Muthusamy 89* (155); Asif Afridi 6/79 (34.3 overs)
138 (49.3 overs); Babar Azam 50 (87); Simon Harmer 6/50 (20 overs)		73/2 (12.3 overs); Aiden Markram 42 (45); Noman Ali 2/40 (6 overs)

South Africa won by 8 wickets
Rawalpindi Cricket Stadium, Rawalpindi
Umpires: Chris Brown (NZ) and Sharfuddoula (Ban)
Player of the match: Keshav Maharaj (SA)

- Pakistan won the toss and elected to bat.
- Asif Afridi, at 38 years and 299 days, became the third oldest Test debutant for Pakistan, after Miran Bakhsh (47 years 284 days) and Amir Elahi (44 years and 45 days), and took his maiden five-wicket haul in Tests, becoming the oldest bowler to do so on debut.
- Simon Harmer (SA) took his maiden five-wicket haul in Tests.
- World Test Championship points: South Africa 12, Pakistan 0.

== T20I series ==
=== 1st T20I ===
28 October 2025
20:00 (N)
Scorecard

South Africa; 194/9 (20 overs)	v	Pakistan; 139 (18.1 overs)
Reeza Hendricks 60 (40); Mohammad Nawaz 3/26 (4 overs)		Saim Ayub 37 (28); Corbin Bosch 4/14 (4 overs)

South Africa won by 55 runs
Rawalpindi Cricket Stadium, Rawalpindi
Umpires: Rashid Riaz (Pak) and Asif Yaqoob (Pak)
Player of the match: George Linde (SA)

- Pakistan won the toss and elected to field.
- Tony de Zorzi (SA) made his T20I debut.

=== 2nd T20I ===
31 October 2025
20:00 (N)
Scorecard

South Africa; 110 (19.2 overs)	v	Pakistan; 112/1 (13.1 overs)
Dewald Brevis 25 (16); Faheem Ashraf 4/23 (3.2 overs)		Saim Ayub 71* (38); Corbin Bosch 1/17 (2 overs)

Pakistan won by 9 wickets
Gaddafi Stadium, Lahore
Umpires: Rashid Riaz (Pak) and Asif Yaqoob (Pak)
Player of the match: Salman Mirza (Pak)

- Pakistan won the toss and elected to field.
- Babar Azam (Pak) became the highest run-scorer in men's T20Is.

=== 3rd T20I ===
1 November 2025
20:00 (N)
Scorecard

South Africa; 139/9 (20 overs)	v	Pakistan; 140/6 (19 overs)
Reeza Hendricks 34 (36); Shaheen Afridi 3/26 (4 overs)		Babar Azam 68 (47); Corbin Bosch 2/24 (4 overs)

Pakistan won by 4 wickets
Gaddafi Stadium, Lahore
Umpires: Faisal Afridi (Pak) and Rashid Riaz (Pak)
Player of the match: Babar Azam (Pak)

- Pakistan won the toss and elected to field.
- Usman Tariq (Pak) made his T20I debut.

== ODI series ==
=== 1st ODI ===
4 November 2025
14:00 (D/N)
Scorecard

South Africa; 263 (49.1 overs)	v	Pakistan; 264/8 (49.4 overs)
Quinton de Kock 63 (71); Naseem Shah 3/40 (9.1 overs)		Salman Ali Agha 62 (71); Corbin Bosch 2/32 (6.4 overs)

Pakistan won by 2 wickets
Iqbal Stadium, Faisalabad
Umpires: Sharfuddoula (Ban) and Asif Yaqoob (Pak)
Player of the match: Salman Ali Agha (Pak)

- Pakistan won the toss and elected to field.
- Donovan Ferreira, Lhuan-dre Pretorius and Sinethemba Qeshile (SA) all made their ODI debuts.
- Shaheen Afridi captained Pakistan for the first time in ODIs.
- Matthew Breetzke captained South Africa for the first time in ODIs.

=== 2nd ODI ===
6 November 2025
14:00 (D/N)
Scorecard

Pakistan; 269/9 (50 overs)	v	South Africa; 270/2 (40.1 overs)
Salman Ali Agha 69 (106); Nandre Burger 4/46 (10 overs)		Quinton de Kock 123* (119); Faheem Ashraf 1/40 (6 overs)

South Africa won by 8 wickets
Iqbal Stadium, Faisalabad
Umpires: Ahsan Raza (Pak) and Alex Wharf (Eng)
Player of the match: Quinton de Kock (SA)

- Pakistan won the toss and elected to bat.

=== 3rd ODI ===
8 November 2025
14:00 (D/N)
Scorecard

South Africa; 143 (37.5 overs)	v	Pakistan; 144/3 (25.1 overs)
Quinton de Kock 53 (70); Abrar Ahmed 4/27 (10 overs)		Saim Ayub 77 (70); Nandre Burger 1/29 (5 overs)

Pakistan won by 7 wickets
Iqbal Stadium, Faisalabad
Umpires: Faisal Afridi (Pak) and Sharfuddoula (Ban)
Player of the match: Abrar Ahmed (Pak)

- South Africa won the toss and elected to bat.
- Rubin Hermann (SA) made his ODI debut.
- Quinton de Kock (SA) scored his 7,000th run in ODIs.
- Babar Azam (Pak) scored 15,000th run in international cricket.
