= Rawalakot Hawks =

Pakistani cricket team

- راولاکوٹ ہاکس
- League: Kashmir Premier League

Personnel
- Captain: Ahmed Shehzad
- Coach: Arshad Khan
- Owner: Jan Wali Shaheen

Team information
- City: Rawalakot, Kashmir
- Founded: 2021; 4 years ago
- Dissolved: 2023; 2 years ago
- Home ground: Muzaffarabad Cricket Stadium

History
- KPL wins: 1 (2021)
T20 kit

Rawalakot Hawks (Urdu: راولاکوٹ ہاکس) is a Pakistani professional T20 franchise cricket team competes in the Kashmir Premier League. They are captained by Ahmed Shehzad and coached by Arshad Khan. The franchise represents Rawalakot, the capital of Poonch district.

== History ==
=== 2021 season ===
They finished 1st in the group stage, winning 3 and losing 1 and having 1 end in no result. They lost to Muzaffarabad Tigers in the qualifier but qualified for the final after defeating Mirpur Royals in eliminator 2. The team won the inaugural edition of the Kashmir Premier League after beating Muzaffarabad in the final.

=== 2022 season ===
On 14 July 2022, Mohammad Amir was announced as Rawalakot's icon player. Ahmed Shehzad was named as Rawalakot's captain.

== Team identity ==
Year	Kit Manufacturer	Front Branding	Back Branding	Chest Branding	Sleeve Branding
2021		JS One Fly High	JS One Fly High	Hope Not Out	Shahid Afridi Foundation
2022		JS One Fly High	JS One Fly High		

== Current squad ==
- Players with international caps are listed in **bold**.
- Ages are correct as of 21 July 2022

No.	Name	Nationality	Birth date	Category	Batting style	Bowling style	Year signed	Notes
Batsmen
6	Babar Khaliq	Pakistan	3 February 1991 (aged 31)	Kashmiri	Right-handed	Off spin	2022	Replacement pick
7	**Ahmed Shehzad**	Pakistan	23 November 1991 (aged 30)	Platinum	Right-handed	Right-arm leg break	2021	
27	Kashif Ali	England	7 February 1998 (aged 24)	Kashmiri	Right-handed	Leg spin	2021	
	Ammad Alam	Pakistan	3 October 1998 (aged 23)	Silver	Right-handed		2022	
	Musadiq Ahmed	Pakistan	1 May 1989 (aged 33)	Silver	Right-handed		2022	
	Saeedullah	Pakistan		Emerging			2022	
	Zeeshan Malik	Pakistan	26 December 1996 (aged 25)	Silver	Right-handed	Off spin	2022	
All-rounders
12	**Hussain Talat**	Pakistan	12 February 1996 (aged 26)	Platinum	Right-handed	Right-arm fast-medium	2021	
15	Sohail Akhtar	Pakistan	2 March 1986 (aged 36)	Supplementary	Right-handed	Right-arm medium	2022	
37	Amad Butt	Pakistan	10 June 1995 (aged 27)	Gold	Right-handed	Right-arm fast	2022	
65	Asif Afridi	Pakistan	25 December 1986 (aged 35)	Diamond	Left-handed	Slow left-arm orthodox	2021	
	Khawaja Muhammad Bilal	Pakistan		Kashmiri			2022	Replacement pick
	Saif Zaib	England	22 May 1998 (aged 24)	Kashmiri	Left-handed	Slow left-arm orthodox	2022	
Wicket-keepers
18	Rohail Nazir	Pakistan	10 October 2001 (aged 20)	Kashmiri	Right-handed		2022	Replacement pick
29	Bismillah Khan	Pakistan	1 March 1990 (aged 32)	Gold	Right-handed		2021	
	Raja Farhan Khan	Pakistan		Kashmiri			2022	
Bowlers
1	Sameen Gul	Pakistan	4 February 1999 (aged 23)	Supplementary	Right-handed	Right-arm medium	2022	
5	**Mohammad Amir**	Pakistan	13 March 1992 (aged 30)	Icon	Left-handed	Left-arm fast	2022	
9	Faisal Akram	Pakistan	20 August 2003 (aged 18)	Silver	Left-handed	Left-arm unorthodox spin	2022	
50	Ihsanullah	Pakistan	11 October 2002 (aged 19)	Emerging	Right-handed	Right-arm fast	2022	
99	Zaman Khan	Pakistan	10 September 2001 (aged 20)	Diamond	Right-handed	Right-arm fast-medium	2021	
	Atif Sheikh	England	18 February 1991 (aged 31)	Kashmiri	Right-handed	Left-arm medium-fast	2022	
	Rohaan Qadri	Pakistan		Kashmiri		Leg spin	2022	Replacement pick
	Zain-ul-Hassan	England	28 October 2000 (aged 21)	Kashmiri	Left-handed	Right-arm medium	2022	

== Captains ==
No.	Nat.	Player	From	To	Mat	Won	Lost	Tie	NR	SR (%)
1	(Pakistan)	Shahid Afridi	2021	2021	8	5	2	0	1	71.43
2	(Pakistan)	Ahmed Shehzad	2022	present	6	2	3	0	1	40.00

== Coaches ==
No.	Nat.	Name	From	To
1	(Pakistan)	Arshad Khan	2021	Present

== Result summary ==
=== Overall result in KPL ===
Year	Pld	Won	Loss	NR	Tied	SR (%)	Position	Summary
2021	8	5	2	1	0	71.43	1/6	Champions
2022	6	2	3	1	0	40.00	6/7	Group Stage

=== Head-to-head record ===
Opposition	Span	Mat	Won	Lost	Tied	NR	SR (%)
Bagh Stallions	2021–present	2	1	0	0	1	100.00
Jammu Janbaz	2022–present	1	1	0	0	0	100.00
Kotli Lions	2021–present	2	0	1	0	1	0.00
Mirpur Royals	2021–present	3	2	1	0	0	66.67
Muzaffarabad Tigers	2021–present	4	3	1	0	0	75.00
Overseas Warriors	2021–present	2	0	2	0	0	0.00

Source: , Last updated: 31 January 2022

== Statistics ==
=== Most runs ===
Nat.	Player	From	To	Matches	Innings	Runs	Average	HS	100	50
(Pakistan)	Ahmed Shehzad	2021	present	10	10	313	39.12	74*	0	4
(Pakistan)	Bismillah Khan	2021	present	11	11	278	30.89	68*	0	2
(Pakistan)	Hussain Talat	2021	present	12	10	252	36.00	69*	0	3
(England)	Kashif Ali	2021	present	7	7	242	48.40	114*	1	2
(Pakistan)	Rohail Nazir	2022	present	5	3	116	38.67	68	0	1

Source: , Last updated: 22 August 2022

=== Most wickets ===
Nat.	Player	From	To	Matches	Overs	Wickets	Average	BBI	4w	5w
(Pakistan)	Asif Afridi	2021	present	12	45.0	16	21.25	3/21	0	0
(Pakistan)	Zaman Khan	2021	present	11	41.1	15	22.60	3/18	0	0
(Pakistan)	Shahid Afridi	2021	2021	6	22.0	8	20.62	2/27	0	0
(Pakistan)	Faisal Akram	2022	present	5	15.0	5	28.80	3/41	0	0
(Pakistan)	Mohammad Amir	2022	present	4	15.1	4	30.75	2/27	0	0

Source: , Last Updated: 23 August 2022
