= Rashid Naseer =

Pakistani cricketer (born 1986)

Rashid Naseer راشد نصیر
Personal information
- Full name: Rashid Naseer
- Born: 4 March 1986 (age 40); Muzaffarabad, Azad Kashmir, Pakistan
- Batting: Left-handed
- Bowling: Left-arm orthodox spin
- Role: All-rounder

Domestic team information
- Years: Team
- 2014: AJK Jaguars
- 2021: Overseas Warriors

Career statistics
Competition	T20
Matches	1
Runs scored	4
Batting average	4.00
100s/50s	0/0
Top score	4
Balls bowled	0
Wickets	0
Bowling average	–
5 wickets in innings	0
10 wickets in match	0
Best bowling	–
Catches/stumpings	0/–
- Source: ESPNcricinfo, 13 June 2022

Rashid Naseer (Urdu: راشد نصیر) (born 4 March 1986 in Muzaffarabad, Azad Kashmir), is a Pakistani cricketer.

== Domestic career ==
Naseer made his debut for AJK Jaguars against Peshawar Panthers in the 2014–15 National T20 Cup. He scored 4 runs and didn't bowl in his debut match as Peshawar won by 9 wickets. In 2021, Naseer was selected by Overseas Warriors during the 2021 Kashmir Premier League draft in the emerging category. He didn't play in any matches as Overseas Warriors were knocked out in the 1st eliminator.
