= Waris Khan Afridi =

Pakistani politician and tribal leader

Minister of State for States and Frontier Regions
- In office 1988–1990
- Prime Minister: Benazir Bhutto

Member of the National Assembly of Pakistan
- In office 1988–1990
- Constituency: NA-33 (Tribal Area-VII)

Malik Waris Khan Afridi is a Pakistani politician and tribal leader from Bara in Khyber Agency. He was elected to the National Assembly of Pakistan from Tribal Area-VII in the 1988 Pakistani general election and later served as Minister of State for States and Frontier Regions in the first government of Benazir Bhutto.

== Political career ==
Afridi was elected to the National Assembly from NA-33 (Tribal Area-VII), representing Khyber Agency, in 1988. During the first government of Benazir Bhutto, he served as minister of state for States and Frontier Regions.

He remained active in politics after leaving the National Assembly. In 2007, he was serving as Fata president of the Pakistan Peoples Party and called for the formation of a grand jirga to end violence in the tribal areas.

In 2011, Afridi headed a 220-member tribal jirga that helped broker a peace accord in Kurram Agency after years of sectarian violence.

== Personal life ==
Afridi is from Bara in Khyber Agency. His son, Asif Afridi, is a Pakistani cricketer.
