= Arsalan Arif =

Pakistani cricketer (born 1993)

Arsalan Arif ارسلان عارف
Personal information
- Full name: Arsalan Arif
- Born: 5 January 1993 (age 33); Mirpur, Azad Kashmir, Pakistan
- Batting: Left-handed
- Bowling: Left-arm orthodox spin
- Role: Bowler

Domestic team information
- Years: Team
- 2014: AJK Jaguars
- 2021: Muzaffarabad Tigers

Career statistics
| Competition | T20 |
|---|---|
| Matches | 3 |
| Runs scored | 12 |
| Batting average | 12.00 |
| 100s/50s | 0/0 |
| Top score | 9 |
| Balls bowled | 57 |
| Wickets | 2 |
| Bowling average | 43.50 |
| 5 wickets in innings | 0 |
| 10 wickets in match | 0 |
| Best bowling | 2/20 |
| Catches/stumpings | 0/– |
- Source: ESPNcricinfo, 16 June 2022

Arsalan Arif (Urdu: ارسلان عارف) (born 5 January 1993 in Mirpur, Azad Kashmir), is a Pakistani cricketer.

== Domestic career ==
Arif made his debut for AJK Jaguars against Islamabad Leopards in the 2014–15 National T20 Cup. He got figures of 2/20 (4 overs), picking up the wickets of Babar Azam and Ali Sarfraz, and scored 9 (7) which led to Islamabad winning by 34 runs. His next match was against Faisalabad Wolves. He didn't bat and got figures of 0/48 (3 overs). Faisalabad won the match by 8 wickets. His last match of the tournament came against Lahore Eagles. He scored 3 (4) and got figures of 0/19 (2.3 overs). Lahore won the match by 7 wickets. In 2021, Arif was selected by Muzaffarabad Tigers during the 2021 KPL draft in the emerging player category. He played in 2 matches for Muzaffarabad. His team went on to lose the final to Rawalakot Hawks.
