= Mirpur Royals =

Pakistani cricket team

- میرپور رائلز
- Nickname: Royals
- League: Kashmir Premier League

Personnel
- Captain: Shoaib Malik
- Coach: Abdul Razzaq
- Owner: Abdul Wajid

Team information
- City: Mirpur, Kashmir
- Founded: 2021; 4 years ago
- Dissolved: 2023; 2 years ago

History
- KPL wins: 1 (2022)
- Official website: www.mirpurroyals.com
T20 kit

Mirpur Royals (Urdu: میرپور رائلز) is a Pakistani professional T20 franchise cricket team that takes part in the Kashmir Premier League. They are captained by Shoaib Malik, coached by former Pakistani cricketer Abdul Razzaq and owned by Abdul Wajid. The team represents the city of Mirpur, the capital of the Mirpur District.

== Team Identity ==
Year	Kit Manufacturer	Front Branding	Back Branding	Chest Branding	Sleeve Branding
2021		Cutting Edge Builders and Developers	POREF	Aaj News	Fair Deal

== History ==
=== 2021 season ===
In first season of Kashmir Premier League, they finished with 3 wins and 2 losses from 5 matches in the group stage. They came third and qualified for the 1st eliminator. Although they defeated Overseas Warriors in the 1st eliminator, they lost the 2nd eliminator to eventual champions, Rawalakot Hawks, even though they scored the highest total in KPL history, it was chased down thanks to a century from Kashif Ali which meant that Mirpur were knocked out of the tournament.

=== 2022 season ===
In July 2022, Shoaib Malik was retained by Mirpur Royals as their icon player.

== Current squad ==
- Players with international caps are listed in **bold**.
- Ages are correct as of 21 July 2022

No.	Name	Nationality	Birth date	Category	Batting style	Bowling style	Year signed	Notes
Batsmen
77	Hassan Nawaz	Pakistan	23 January 1992 (aged 30)	Emerging	Right-handed	Right-arm fast-medium	2022	
	Arsalan Mehzood	Pakistan	6 June 1998 (aged 24)		Right-handed		2022	Post-draft signing
	Hamza Arshad	Pakistan	15 March 1995 (aged 27)	Silver	Left-handed	Slow left-arm orthodox	2022	
	Shan Khan	Pakistan	1 June 2003 (aged 19)	Kashmiri	Right-handed	Right-arm medium-fast	2022	
	Zaid Alam	Pakistan	24 December 1999 (aged 22)	Silver	Right-handed	Right-arm fast-medium	2022	
All-rounders
9	**Imad Wasim**	Pakistan	18 December 1988 (aged 33)	Platinum	Left-handed	Slow left-arm orthodox	2022	
18	**Shoaib Malik**	Pakistan	1 February 1982 (aged 40)	Icon	Right-handed	Right-arm off spin	2021	Captain
89	**Haris Sohail**	Pakistan	9 January 1989 (aged 33)	Platinum	Left-handed	Slow left-arm orthodox	2022	
	Ali Imran	Pakistan	25 February 1998 (aged 24)	Diamond	Right-handed	Slow left-arm orthodox	2022	
	Ali Razzaq	Pakistan		Emerging	Right-handed	Right-arm medium-fast	2022	
	Umar Hayat	Pakistan	20 January 2001 (aged 21)	Kashmiri	Right-handed	Off spin	2022	
Wicket-keepers
27	Raza-ul-Mustafa	Pakistan	27 December 2003 (aged 18)	Supplementary	Right-handed		2022	
61	Muhammad Akhlaq	Pakistan	12 November 1992 (aged 29)	Gold	Right-handed	Right-arm medium-fast	2021	
Bowlers
7	Abrar Ahmed	Pakistan	16 October 1998 (aged 23)	Gold	Left-handed	Left-arm leg break	2021	
38	Shadab Majeed	Pakistan	7 June 1997 (aged 25)	Kashmiri	Right-handed	Right-arm medium fast	2021	
41	Kashif Ali	Pakistan	4 October 2002 (aged 19)	Silver	Right-handed	Right-arm medium	2022	
66	Izhar-ul-Haq	Pakistan	6 April 2007 (aged 15)	Kashmiri	Right-handed	Right-arm medium-fast	2022	Post-draft signing
82	Sufiyan Muqeem	Pakistan		Kashmiri			2022	
86	**Yasir Shah**	Pakistan	2 May 1986 (aged 36)	Supplementary	Right-handed	Leg spin	2022	
99	Salman Irshad	Pakistan	3 December 1995 (aged 26)	Diamond	Right-handed	Right-arm fast	2021	
	Faizan Saleem	Pakistan		Kashmiri	Right-handed	Right-arm medium	2022	
	Zubair Lodhi	Pakistan	20 June 1996 (aged 26)	Silver	Right-handed	Right-arm medium-fast	2022	

== Captains ==
No.	Nat.	Player	From	To	Mat	Won	Lost	Tied (won)	Tied (lost)	NR	SR (%)
1	(Pakistan)	Shoaib Malik	2021	present	15	7	5	1	0	2	61.54

== Coaches ==
No.	Nat.	Name	From	To
1	(Pakistan)	Inzamam-ul-Haq	2021	2021
2	(Pakistan)	Abdul Razzaq	2022	Present

== Result summary ==
=== Overall result in KPL ===
Year	Pld	Won	Loss	NR	Tied (won)	Tied (lost)	SR(%)	Position	Summary
2021	7	3	3	0	1	0	57.14	3/6	Play-offs
2022	8	4	2	2	0	0	66.67	1/6	Champions

=== Head-to-head record ===
Opposition	Span	Mat	Won	Lost	Tied (won)	Tied (lost)	NR	SR(%)
Bagh Stallions	2021–present	4	0	2	0	0	2	0.00
Jammu Janbaz	2022–present	1	1	0	0	0	0	100.00
Kotli Lions	2021–present	2	1	0	1	0	0	100.00
Muzaffarabad Tigers	2021–present	2	2	0	0	0	0	100.00
Overseas Warriors	2021–present	3	2	1	0	0	0	66.67
Rawalakot Hawks	2021–present	2	0	2	0	0	0	0.00

Source: , Last updated: 31 January 2022

== Statistics ==
=== Most runs ===
Nat.	Player	From	To	Matches	Innings	Runs	Average	HS	100	50
(Pakistan)	Shoaib Malik	2021	present	13	13	419	41.90	77	0	1
(Pakistan)	Muhammad Akhlaq	2021	present	11	11	300	33.33	68	0	2
(Pakistan)	Sharjeel Khan	2021	2021	6	6	296	49.33	141	1	1
(Pakistan)	Hassan Nawaz	2022	present	6	6	241	40.17	68	0	2
(Pakistan)	Mukhtar Ahmed	2021	2021	7	7	194	27.71	61	0	1

Source: , Last updated: 22 August 2022

=== Most wickets ===
Nat.	Player	From	To	Matches	Overs	Wickets	Average	BBI	4w	5w
(Pakistan)	Salman Irshad	2021	present	13	50.0	21	21.57	3/25	0	0
(Pakistan)	Shadab Majeed	2021	present	11	36.4	15	25.13	4/45	1	0
(Pakistan)	Amad Butt	2021	2021	7	25.0	11	19.54	3/20	0	0
(Pakistan)	Abrar Ahmed	2022	present	9	36.0	8	33.25	2/9	0	0
(Pakistan)	Imad Wasim	2022	present	5	19.0	6	21.50	2/14	0	0

Source: , Last Updated: 22 August 2022
