= Kashmir Premier League (Pakistan) =

Defunct Cricket League that was held during 2021-22

- Official logo of the KPL
- Countries: Pakistan
- Administrator: Pakistan Cricket Board
- Format: Twenty20
- First edition: 2021
- Latest edition: 2022
- Tournament format: Single round-robin and playoffs
- Number of teams: 7
- Current champion: Mirpur Royals (1st title)
- Most successful: Rawalakot Hawks; Mirpur Royals (1 title each)
- Most runs: Sharjeel Khan (569)
- Most wickets: Salman Irshad (21)
- TV: List of Broadcasters
- Website: kpl20.com

The Kashmir Premier League (Urdu: کشمیر پریمیئر لیگ; abbreviated KPL) was a professional Twenty20 cricket league organized by Pakistan Cricket Board in Azad Kashmir. The league was founded in 2021. It consists of seven franchises; five teams representing major cities in Azad Kashmir, one team representing the Indian-administered city of Jammu, and one team representing the Kashmiri diaspora. Each team plays the group stage matches in a single round-robin tournament with the top four teams qualifying for the playoffs and ultimately for the final. Matches played in the Kashmir Premier League do not have official T20 status.

== History ==
In December 2020, Chairperson of the Parliamentary Special Committee on Kashmir, Shehryar Afridi launched the Kashmir Premier League in Azad Kashmir. The President of Azad Kashmir, Masood Khan, was appointed as the Chief Patron of the Kashmir Premier League. Ch. Shahzad Akhtar is the CEO and Arif Malik is the founding President of the Kashmir Premier League, and former Pakistan captain Wasim Akram is the founding Vice President. Shahid Afridi is the Brand Ambassador of the KPL, while Shoaib Akhtar is the peace ambassador of the league. On 16 February 2021, the official anthem of the league was released. It was directed by Shaan Shahid and sung by Rahat Fateh Ali Khan. Many Pakistani film celebrities, such as Mehwish Hayat, Iman Ali, Ali Gul Pir, Neelam Muneer, Juggun Kazim and Ayesha Omar are brand ambassadors of the Kashmir Premier League. KPL has partnered with Shahid Afridi Foundation as a charity organization.

The league was initially scheduled to start in May 2021. However, the Pakistan Cricket Board moved the time window for its start to August 2021. On 14 June 2021, diamond category of the Kashmir Premier League was announced. On 2 August 2021, the match schedule for the inaugural season of the KPL was announced. On 6 August, the opening ceremony of the league was held, with only 25% spectators allowed in the stadium amid the ongoing COVID-19 pandemic. The KPL was showcased at Expo 2020 from 25 to 27 March 2022. The showcase was hosted by Zaariya Khan and some attendees were Shoaib Malik, Mohammad Amir, Herschelle Gibbs and Wasim Akram. In May 2022, former Pakistani captain Rashid Latif was appointed as the KPL's Director of Cricket Operations. A league committee was formed on 7 July 2022. Bagh Stallions’ co-owner, Tauqir Sultan Awan, was elected as its chairman.

== Teams ==
There are seven teams in the league, representing six major cities in Kashmir with the final team representing overseas Kashmiris.

Cities represented by KPL teams

Team	Owner	Location	Founded	Captain	Coach
Bagh Stallions	Tauqir Sultan Awan	Bagh, played all matches in Muzaffarabad	2021	Umar Amin	Abdul Rehman
Jammu Janbaz	Ghulam Hussain Shahid	Jammu, played all matches in Muzaffarabad	2022	Faheem Ashraf	Riaz Afridi
Kotli Lions	Mushtaq Ahmed	Kotli, played all matches in Muzaffarabad	2021	Khurram Manzoor	Mushtaq Ahmed
Mirpur Royals	Abdul Wajid	Mirpur, played all matches in Muzaffarabad	2021	Shoaib Malik	Abdul Razzaq
Muzaffarabad Tigers	Arshad Khan Tanoli	Muzaffarabad	2021	Mohammad Hafeez	Misbah-ul-Haq
Overseas Warriors	Zeeshan Altaf Lohya	Kashmiri diaspora, played all matches in Muzaffarabad	2021	Asad Shafiq	Azam Khan
Rawalakot Hawks	Jan Wali Shaheen	Rawalakot, played all matches in Muzaffarabad	2021	Ahmed Shehzad	Arshad Khan

== Seasons ==
=== First season (2021) ===
The first edition of the league was held from the 6th to 17 August 2021 at the Muzaffarabad Cricket Stadium. Herschelle Gibbs was the only foreign player to arrive for the league, but didn't play a single match for his team, the Overseas Warriors, in the first season. Daryll Cullinan and Morné van Wyk are two foreign commentators in the first edition of the league. SR Group is the official title sponsor of the KPL 2021. The Rawalakot Hawks were the champions of first season, defeating the Muzaffarabad Tigers in the final. On 18 August 2021, it was announced that the second season of KPL will feature a seventh team.

=== Second season (2022) ===
The 2022 Kashmir Premier League is taking place from 13 August to 26 August with all matches taking place at the Muzaffarabad Cricket Stadium. The 2022 KPL also featured the addition of Jammu Janbaz. The title sponsor is Kingdom Valley, who also own the franchise Jammu Janbaz.

== Results ==
=== Season results ===
Season	No. of teams	Final			Venue	Player of the series
Season	No. of teams	Winner	Winning margin	Runner-up	Venue	Player of the series
2021 Details	6	Rawalakot Hawks; 169/7 (20 overs)	7 runs Scorecard	Muzaffarabad Tigers; 162/9 (20 overs)	Muzaffarabad Cricket Stadium	Hussain Talat (Rawalakot Hawks)
2022 Details	7	Mirpur Royals	Match abandoned (Match awarded to Mirpur Royals); Scorecard	Bagh Stallions	Muzaffarabad Cricket Stadium	Shoaib Malik (Mirpur Royals)

=== Team results ===
Season	2021	2022
Bagh Stallions	5th	RU
Jammu Janbaz	—	5th
Kotli Lions	6th	4th
Mirpur Royals	3rd	C
Muzaffarabad Tigers	RU	7th
Overseas Warriors	4th	3rd
Rawalakot Hawks	C	6th

Notes

- W = Winner
- RU = Runner-up
- (x) = End of league games table position
- — = Team not in existence during the season

== Controversies ==
On 31 July 2021, it was reported that foreign cricketers were requested by the Indian cricket board (BCCI) against taking part in the inaugural Kashmir Premier League cricket tournament. Former Pakistani wicket keeper Rashid Latif tweeted that BCCI is warning other cricket boards that if their former players took part in Kashmir Premier League, they won't be allowed entry in India or allowed to work in Indian cricket at any level or in any capacity. Former South African cricketer Herschelle Gibbs, who played for the Overseas Warriors, also accused BCCI of pressuring him to not play in the KPL. The Pakistan cricket board (PCB) expressed displeasure at the reports that BCCI is trying to prevent players from joining the tournament and said that it would raise the issue with the relevant ICC forum. Responding to Gibbs and the PCB, the BCCI said that they are well within their rights to take decisions with respect to the cricketing ecosystem in India.

On 1 August 2021, former England spinner Monty Panesar pulled out of the tournament. He took to Twitter to reveal the news and said that, "I have decided not to participate in the KPL because of the political tensions between India and Pakistan over Kashmir issues. I don't want to be in the middle of this, it would make me feel uncomfortable." Panesar further said in an interview that "BCCI had 'advised' him that if he played in the event, the 'consequences' of his decision could include not being granted a visa to India in the future and not being allowed to work in the country."

On 2 August 2021, the BCCI urged ICC not to recognise the Kashmir Premier League due to the disputed nature of Kashmir region between India and Pakistan. In response, the ICC clarified that the tournament doesn't come under their jurisdiction as it is not an international tournament. The 2021 KPL received 15 million views within the first 5 matches and broke the record for Pakistan's most viewed live sports event launch on digital media. The president of the KPL, Arif Malik, said that the BCCI's efforts to stop the league only popularised it instead.

In June 2022, four franchises of the KPL (Bagh Stallions, Mirpur Royals, Muzaffarabad Tigers and Rawalakot Hawks) wrote a letter to the PCB, requesting that the PCB withhold the NOC for the 2022 KPL. They cited the tournament management's inefficiency to handle all of the matters properly. The main concerns were that an audit report was not provided for the first season and a league committee was not formed despite this being included in their agreement. The PCB also said that they would issue a NOC if certain conditions were met. The PCB later issued an NOC after the KPL provided all the requested documents. A league committee was also formed on 7 July 2022.

In August 2022, Nasir Yusuf, one of the co-owners of Kotli Lions, filed a petition in the Sindh High Court that Faisal Nadeem and Khalid Zia, the other co-owners of Kotli Lions, had sidelined him from the team. Yusuf's lawyer said that Nadeem and Zia had overtaken the team and had not contacted Yusuf. They said that Kotli Lions should be barred from participating in the tournament without Yusuf's permission. Faisal Nadeem, Khalid Zia, President of the KPL, Arif Malik, CEO of the KPL, Chaudhry Shahzad Akhtar and vice-president of the KPL, Wasim Akram were all issued notices for 15 August from the court.

During the 2022 KPL, the KPL terminated Kotli Lions’ management after they weren't able to pay outstanding payments. Kotli Lions’ head coach Saeed Azad left the team and was replaced by Mushtaq Ahmed. The KPL management temporarily took over Kotli Lions. The KPL also terminated the Overseas Warriors’ management after they were unable to pay their players. Zeeshan Altaf Lohya was later given ownership of Overseas Warriors.

In January 2023, the KPL management sent a legal notice to Kingdom Valley, sponsors of the 2022 KPL, for not paying the agreed amounts to the KPL. The KPL management claimed that Kingdom Valley still had to pay Rs. 137 million. The KPL also claimed that they still had to pay players Rs. 90 million which they could only pay after receiving payments from sponsors. The owner of Kingdom Valley, Ghulam Hussain Shahid, claimed that the KPL had begged him to sponsor the tournament and had asked him to pay Rs. 40 million in advance and to pay the rest whenever he wanted. He also claimed that he had to pay all government taxes while the KPL paid none. In May 2023, Dawn reported that a number of umpires in the 2022 KPL had still not received their payments. A KPL spokesperson said that these payments had not been made due to huge losses incurred from the tournament but will be cleared soon.

== See also ==
- National T20 Cup
- Pakistan Super League
