= Zeeshan Ashraf (cricketer) =

Pakistani cricketer (born 1992)

Personal information
- Full name: Zeeshan Ali Ashraf
- Born: 11 May 1992 (age 34); Okara, Punjab, Pakistan
- Batting: Left-handed
- Bowling: Right-arm offbreak
- Role: Wicket-keeper-batter

Domestic team information
- Years: Team
- 2019–2022: Southern Punjab
- 2020: Multan Sultans (squad no. 60)
- 2023/24–present: Multan Region (squad no. 26)

Career statistics
Competition	FC	LA	T20
Matches	34	30	66
Runs scored	1,794	928	986
Batting average	29.40	32.00	17.29
100s/50s	6/5	1/6	0/5
Top score	141	166*	73
Catches/stumpings	16/0	13/0	22/2
- Source: Cricinfo, 8 September 2022

Zeeshan Ashraf (born 11 May 1992) is a Pakistani cricketer. He made his first-class debut for Multan in the 2012–13 Quaid-e-Azam Trophy on 13 January 2013. He was the leading run-scorer for Multan in the 2018–19 Quaid-e-Azam One Day Cup, with 370 runs in eight matches. In March 2019, he was named in Balochistan's squad for the 2019 Pakistan Cup.

== Career ==
Ashraf began cricket career when he joined school cricket team of Government Islamia High School in Okara. His performance in school cricket led to participation in regional Under-15 tournaments.

At 15, Ashraf was noticed by Mian Munir, then Club President at Okara Gymkhana Cricket Club, and joined the club, eventually becoming its captain.

In 2013, Wasim Haider facilitated his entry into first-class cricket with Multan and on his debut he made a half-century. Later, he also played in limited-overs formats with the Multan Tigers. Despite setbacks, including being dropped from the Pakistan Under-23s and playing during Multan's relegation to Grade II, Ashraf continued to compete in club cricket.

He later joined Ghani Glass cricket team, where he led the scoring in the PCB Patron's Trophy (Grade II). Ashraf also played for Lahore Whites in the National T20 Cup and opened the batting for Balochistan in the Pakistan Cup of 2019.
