= Rohail Nazir =

Pakistani cricketer (born 2001)

Personal information
- Full name: Rohail Nazir
- Born: 10 October 2001 (age 25); Islamabad, Pakistan
- Batting: Right-handed
- Role: Wicket-keeper-batsman

International information
- National side: Pakistan (2023)
- T20I debut (cap 108): 3 October 2023 v Hong Kong
- Last T20I: 7 October 2023 v Bangladesh

Domestic team information
- Years: Team
- 2018; 2021: Islamabad United
- 2018/19: Islamabad
- 2019/20–present: Northern
- 2020; 2022: Multan Sultans

Career statistics
Competition	T20I	First-class	List A	T20
Matches	3	43	52	79
Runs scored	23	1,964	1,530	921
Batting average	11.50	34.45	34.77	17.71
100s/50s	0/0	5/12	2/9	0/2
Top score	13	149	113	58
Balls bowled	–	6	–	–
Wickets	–	0	–	–
Bowling average	–	–	–	–
5 wickets in innings	–	–	–	–
10 wickets in match	–	–	–	–
Best bowling	–	–	–	–
Catches/stumpings	3/0	127/18	49/6	49/9
- Source: Cricinfo, 20 October 2025

Rohail Nazir (born 10 October 2001) is a Pakistani cricketer and a former captain of Pakistan's under-19 cricket team.

A wicket-keeper batsman, Rohail Nazir favors back-foot play, especially the back-foot punch.

== Early life ==
Rohail Nazir's elder brother, Tahir Nazir, is well known in Pakistan's tape-ball circuit and has served as his early inspiration. He developed his cricket in Islamabad without formal school competition, playing street cricket before joining Diamond Cricket Club in 2016 at age 15 after missing out on regional U-16 selection the previous year.

Elevated to vice-captain of Islamabad U-16s, he struck two centuries at the Pepsi PCB U-16 tournament and earned an NCA call-up, leading to selection for Pakistan U-16 against Australia in the UAE (early 2017), where he scored two hundreds and effected seven stumpings and one catch. For Islamabad in inter-region Under-19 one-day and three-day competitions, Nazir was adjudged best all-rounder/outstanding cricketer in the three-day tournament with 508 runs, 25 catches, and two stumpings; across both formats he amassed 914 runs (second-highest aggregate) with 44 dismissals. He twice featured in Lahore Qalandars Rising Stars programme and an Australia tour.

== Youth career ==
In December 2017, he was named in Pakistan's squad for the 2018 Under-19 Cricket World Cup.

In November 2019, he was named as the vice-captain of Pakistan's squad for the 2019 ACC Emerging Teams Asia Cup in Bangladesh. He was the leading run-scorer in the tournament, with 302 runs in five matches, including a match-winning century in the final.

In December 2019, he was named as the captain of Pakistan's squad for the 2020 Under-19 Cricket World Cup.

== Domestic and franchise career ==
He made his Twenty20 debut for Islamabad in the 2017–18 National T20 Cup on 22 November 2017. In December 2017, he was picked by Islamabad United as an emerging player for 2018 season.

In April 2018, he was named in Baluchistan's squad for the 2018 Pakistan Cup. He made his first-class debut for Islamabad in the 2018–19 Quaid-e-Azam Trophy on 1 September 2018, scoring 130 runs in the first innings. He made his List A debut for Islamabad in the 2018–19 Quaid-e-Azam One Day Cup on 6 September 2018.

In September 2019, he was named in Northern's squad for the 2019–20 Quaid-e-Azam Trophy tournament. During the tournament, Rohail scored 320 runs in six matches, including two fifties in the final. For Northern in the first innings of that match, he made a resilient 80 off 115 (12 fours), rescuing the side from 69 for 5 in a 155-run stand with Faizan Riaz, and followed up with 70 off 96 (nine fours) in the second innings.

In December 2019, he was drafted by the Pakistan Super League (PSL) franchise Multan Sultans in Emerging category during the 2020 PSL draft.

In December 2020, he was shortlisted as one of the Men's Emerging Cricketer of the Year for the 2020 PCB Awards.

In October 2021, following the conclusion of the 2021–22 National T20 Cup, he was named as the wicket-keeper of the tournament, contributing to twelve dismissals.

In December 2021, he was signed by the Karachi Kings following the players' draft for the 2022 Pakistan Super League.

== International career ==
In June 2020, he was added to Pakistan's touring party for their series against England, after ten of the original squad tested positive for COVID-19 prior to departing.

In October 2020, he was named in a 22-man squad of "probables" for Pakistan's home series against Zimbabwe. In November 2020, he was named in Pakistan's 35-man squad for their tour to New Zealand.

In September 2025, he was named in the 18-man Test squad for the South Africa home series.
