= Amad Butt =

Pakistani cricketer

Personal information
- Born: 10 May 1995 (age 31); Sialkot, Punjab, Pakistan
- Nickname: Six Pack
- Height: 6 ft (183 cm)
- Batting: Right-handed
- Bowling: Right-arm fast-medium
- Role: Bowling all-rounder

Domestic team information
- Years: Team
- 2015: Karachi Whites
- 2017–2020: Islamabad United (squad no. 9)
- 2016: Punjab
- 2017: Lahore Whites
- 2019–present: Jamaica Tallawahs
- 2019–present: Balochistan
- 2021–2022: Peshawar Zalmi
- 2023–: Multan Sultans (squad no. 37)
- 2023: Khulna Tigers

Career statistics
| Competition | FC | LA | T20 |
|---|---|---|---|
| Matches | 50 | 90 | 90 |
| Runs scored | 1,593 | 1,311 | 621 |
| Batting average | 23.08 | 23.41 | 15.52 |
| 100s/50s | 1/7 | 2/3 | 0/0 |
| Top score | 106 | 105 | 43* |
| Balls bowled | 7,021 | 3,894 | 1,657 |
| Wickets | 146 | 115 | 101 |
| Bowling average | 27.08 | 31.98 | 24.03 |
| 5 wickets in innings | 6 | 1 | 0 |
| 10 wickets in match | 1 | 0 | 0 |
| Best bowling | 6/57 | 5/54 | 4/27 |
| Catches/stumpings | 21/– | 39/— | 31/— |
- Source: Cricinfo, 5 January 2025

Amad Butt (born 10 May 1995) is a cricketer from Punjab, Pakistan.

== Domestic career ==
He was the leading wicket-taker for Habib Bank Limited in the 2017–18 Quaid-e-Azam Trophy, with 39 dismissals in eight matches.

In April 2018, he was named in Federal Areas' squad for the 2018 Pakistan Cup. He was the leading wicket-taker for Habib Bank Limited in the 2018–19 Quaid-e-Azam One Day Cup, with fifteen dismissals in nine matches. In March 2019, he was named in Balochistan's squad for the 2019 Pakistan Cup. He was the joint-leading wicket-taker in the tournament, with ten dismissals in five matches.

In September 2019, he was named in Balochistan's squad for the 2019–20 Quaid-e-Azam Trophy tournament. In October 2019, the Pakistan Cricket Board (PCB) named him as one of the six players to watch ahead of the 2019–20 National T20 Cup tournament.

Butt captained Sialkot to a one-wicket victory in the final of the 2024–25 Quaid-e-Azam Trophy. He took 4 for 51 and 2 for 66 and scored 10 and 65 (the highest individual score on either side), and won the player of the match award. Later that season he captained Pakistan Television to a three-wicket victory in the final of the 2024–25 President's Trophy.

== International career ==
In November 2019, he was named in Pakistan's squad for the 2019 ACC Emerging Teams Asia Cup in Bangladesh. In January 2020, he was named in Pakistan's Twenty20 International (T20I) squad for their series against Bangladesh. In November 2020, he was named in Pakistan's 35-man squad for their tour to New Zealand. In January 2021, he was named in Pakistan's T20I squad for their series against South Africa.
