= Asif Afridi =

Pakistani cricketer

Personal information
- Full name: Asif Khan Afridi
- Born: 25 December 1986 (age 39); Peshawar, Pakistan
- Height: 1.88 m (6 ft 2 in)
- Batting: Left-handed
- Bowling: Slow left-arm orthodox
- Role: Bowling all-rounder
- Relatives: Waris Khan Afridi (father)

International information
- National side: Pakistan (2025)
- Only Test (cap 260): 20 October 2025 v South Africa

Domestic team information
- Years: Team
- 2019/20–2022: Khyber Pakhtunkhwa
- 2021–2022: Rawalakot Hawks
- 2021–2022: Multan Sultans
- 2023/24–present: FATA
- 2025: Lahore Qalandars

Career statistics
Competition	Test	FC	LA	T20
Matches	1	57	60	85
Runs scored	4	1,630	699	513
Batting average	4.00	19.40	19.41	14.65
100s/50s	0/0	1/8	0/4	0/1
Top score	4	112	74	54
Balls bowled	231	10,358	3,198	1,558
Wickets	6	198	83	78
Bowling average	15.66	25.49	29.81	23.20
5 wickets in innings	1	13	2	1
10 wickets in match	0	2	0	0
Best bowling	6/79	6/36	5/31	5/26
Catches/stumpings	–/–	20/–	14/–	20/–
- Source: ESPNcricinfo, 23 October 2025

Asif Khan Afridi (born 25 December 1986) is a Pakistani international cricketer. He made his Test debut against South Africa at Rawalpindi in October 2025, at age 38.

== Personal life ==
Asif Afridi was born on 25 December 1986 in Peshawar, Pakistan to a tribal leader and former government minister, Waris Khan Afridi, who has served as Minister of State for States and Frontier Regions in the first government of Benazir Bhutto. He is married and has five children, four sons and one daughter, who has cerebral palsy.

== Domestic career ==
Afridi made his first-class debut in 2009. He hails from Khyber Pakhtunkhwa and has represented regional teams including Khyber Agency and Federally Administered Tribal Areas (FATA) in Pakistan's domestic cricket.

He played in 2017–18 Quaid-e-Azam Trophy and was the leading wicket-taker for FATA, with 30 dismissals in seven matches. He was also the leading wicket-taker for FATA in the 2018–19 Quaid-e-Azam Trophy, with thirty dismissals in seven matches.

In January 2021, Afridi was named in Khyber Pakhtunkhwa's squad for the 2020–21 Pakistan Cup. In the final of the tournament, he took a five-wicket haul, to be named the player of the match and the bowler of the tournament.

In February 2023, Afridi was banned by the Pakistan Cricket Board (PCB) from all cricket for a period of two years for failing to report an approach "to engage in corrupt conduct" during the National Twenty20 Cup. The ban was later reduced to one year.

== International career ==
In March 2022, Afridi was named in Pakistan's One Day International (ODI) and Twenty20 International (T20I) squads for their series against Australia.

In October 2025, Afridi made his Test debut for Pakistan in the second match against South Africa in Rawalpindi. At 38, Afridi was the third-oldest to make his international debut for Pakistan, after Miran Bakhsh, also a tall spinner, who debuted in 1955 at the age of 47 against India, and Amir Elahi, who debuted at 44 in 1952, also against India. Afridi became the oldest player to take five wickets on debut, breaking a 92-year-old record previously held by Charles Marriott since 1933.
