= Bismillah Khan (cricketer) =

Pakistani cricketer

Personal information
- Born: 1 March 1990 (age 36); Quetta, Balochistan, Pakistan
- Batting: Right-handed
- Role: Wicket-keeper

Domestic team information
- Years: Team
- 2011–2015: Quetta Bears
- 2012–2018: United Bank Limited
- 2016–2017: Quetta Gladiators
- 2019/20–present: Balochistan
- 2026: Quetta Gladiators
- Source: Cricinfo, 14 November 2015

Bismillah Khan (born 1 March 1990) is a Pakistani cricketer who plays for Balochistan and Pakistan Super League (PSL) team Quetta Gladiators.

Khan is a wicket-keeper batsman. He was placed in the Emerging category of the PSL and was bought by the Quetta Gladiators for 10,000 US Dollars. He scored 55 from 30 balls in his debut match against Lahore Qalandars and was man of the match. In April 2018, he was named in Balochistan's squad for the 2018 Pakistan Cup. In March 2019, he was named in Balochistan's squad for the 2019 Pakistan Cup.

In September 2019, he was named in Balochistan's squad for the 2019–20 Quaid-e-Azam Trophy tournament and in January 2021, in Balochistan's squad for the 2020–21 Pakistan Cup.
