= Sohail Akhtar =

Pakistani cricketer

Personal information
- Born: 2 March 1986 (age 40); Haripur, Pakistan
- Batting: Right-handed
- Bowling: Right-arm medium
- Role: All-rounder

Domestic team information
- Years: Team
- 2012-2013: Abbottabad Falcons
- 2018: FATA
- 2018: Punjab
- 2018-2022: Lahore Qalandars
- 2019-present: Northern
- Source: Cricinfo, 24 October 2019

Sohail Akhtar (born 2 March 1986) is a Pakistani cricketer. He made his first-class debut for Abbottabad in the 2012–13 Quaid-e-Azam Trophy on 25 January 2013. He plays for Lahore Qalandars in the Pakistan Super League and was their captain until he was replaced by Shaheen Afridi in the 2022 season.

== Domestic career ==
Sohail Akhtar made his first-class debut for Abbottabad in the 2012–13 Quaid-e-Azam Trophy on 25 January 2013. He also played for the team in the 2013–14 Quaid-e-Azam Trophy. Sohail Akhtar was named in Lahore Qalandars' squad for the 2018 Pakistan Super League. In April 2018, he was named in Punjab's squad for the 2018 Pakistan Cup. Later, he was named in Northern's squad for 2019–20 National T20 Cup.

== Personal life ==
Akhtar was born in Haripur and speaks Hindko, his native language.
