= Asif Yaqoob =

Cricket umpire

Personal information
- Full name: Muhammad Asif Yaqoob
- Born: 11 November 1973 (age 53); Peshawar, Khyber Pakhtunkhwa, Pakistan
- Role: Umpire

Umpiring information
- Tests umpired: 3 (2024–2025)
- ODIs umpired: 24 (2019–2025)
- T20Is umpired: 40 (2018–2026)
- WODIs umpired: 21 (2015–2022)
- WT20Is umpired: 12 (2019–2023)
- Source: ESPN Cricinfo, 20 June 2023

Asif Yaqoob (Urdu: آصف یعقوب; born 11 November 1973) is a Pakistani cricket umpire.

== Career ==
Yaqoob began his umpiring career in 2003. As an umpire, his first Twenty20 International (T20I) and his first One Day International (ODI) were played between Pakistan and Australia, on 26 October 2018, and 27 March 2019, respectively. He was one of the sixteen umpires for the 2020 Under-19 Cricket World Cup tournament in South Africa. In December 2020, he was shortlisted for Umpire of the Year in the 2020 Pakistan Cricket Board (PCB) Awards. On January 6, 2022 Yaqoob was awarded Umpire of the Year 2021 by the PCB.

In January 2022, he was named as one of the on-field umpires for the 2022 ICC Under-19 Cricket World Cup in the West Indies.

He has also officiated in the Pakistan Super League.

He was included in the ICC International Panel of Umpires for the 2024–25 session.

In May 2024, he was named as one of the 23 match officials for the 2024 ICC Men’s T20 World Cup.

In December 2024, he stood in his first test match during the 2nd Test between Bangladesh and West Indies.

== See also ==
- List of Test cricket umpires
- List of One Day International cricket umpires
- List of Twenty20 International cricket umpires
