= Kashif Ali (cricketer, born 1998) =

English cricketer (born 1998)

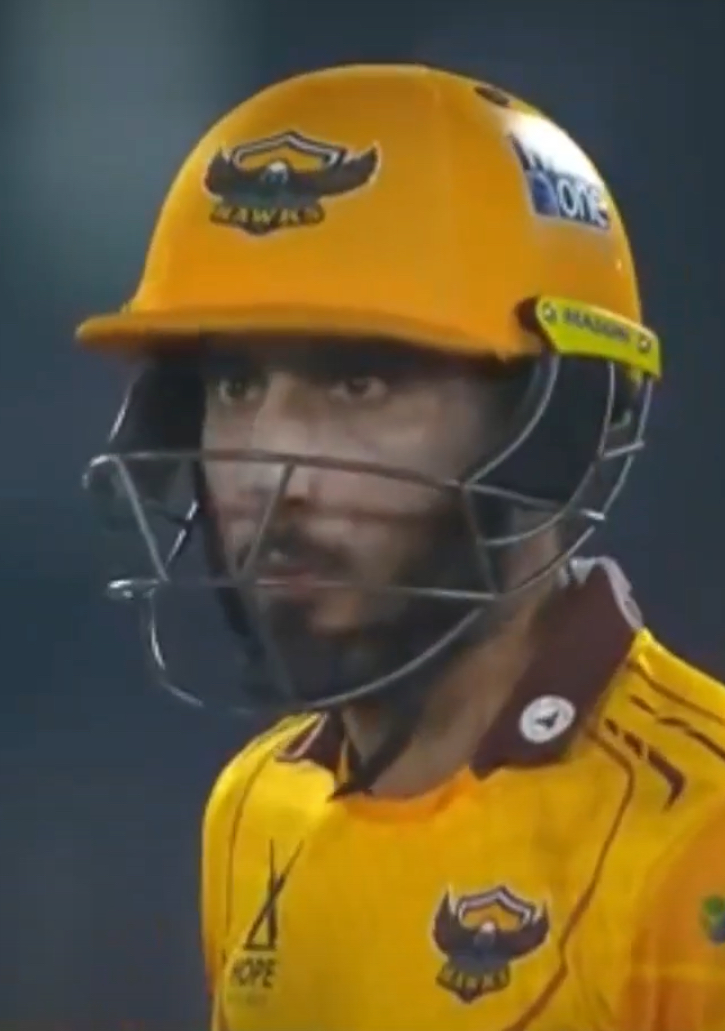
- Ali in 2021

Personal information
- Born: 7 February 1998 (age 28); Kotli, Azad Kashmir, Pakistan
- Batting: Right-handed
- Bowling: Right-arm leg break
- Role: Batter

Domestic team information
- Years: Team
- 2022–present: Worcestershire (squad no. 27)
- 2023/24–2025/26: Ghani Glass
- First-class debut: 25 July 2022; Worcestershire v Derbyshire
- List A debut: 2 August 2022; Worcestershire v Kent

Career statistics
Competition	FC	LA	T20
Matches	46	31	52
Runs scored	2,180	1,206	1,054
Batting average	27.25	41.58	23.95
100s/50s	3/12	2/9	0/4
Top score	133	114	88
Balls bowled	380	–	6
Wickets	3	–	0
Bowling average	112.00	–	–
5 wickets in innings	0	–	–
10 wickets in match	0	–	–
Best bowling	2/13	–	–
Catches/stumpings	12/–	8/–	20/–
- Source: Cricinfo, 11 August 2026

Kashif Ali (born 7 February 1998) is a Pakistani-born English cricketer.

== Career ==
Kashif Ali made his Twenty20 debut for the Marylebone Cricket Club in the 2018 MCC Tri-Nation Series against the Netherlands on 29 July 2018. Ali has also been part of Kent County Cricket Club's academy scholar programme, and Nottinghamshire County Cricket Club's second XI.

In June 2022, Ali signed for Worcestershire County Cricket Club, becoming the first person to graduate from the South Asian Cricket Academy and sign with a first-class county team. He made his first-class debut on 25 July 2022, for Worcestershire against Derbyshire in the 2022 County Championship.

In April 2024, Ali scored his maiden first-class cricket hundred.
