= Mohammad Wasim Jr. =

Pakistani cricketer (born 2001)

Personal information
- Full name: Mohammad Wasim
- Born: 25 August 2001 (age 25); North Waziristan District, Khyber Pakhtunkhwa, Pakistan
- Height: 6 ft 2 in (188 cm)
- Batting: Right-handed
- Bowling: Right-arm fast-medium
- Role: Bowler

International information
- National side: Pakistan (2021-present)
- Test debut (cap 253): 17 December 2022 v England
- Last Test: 26 December 2022 v New Zealand
- ODI debut (cap 232): 29 March 2022 v Australia
- Last ODI: 5 April 2025 v New Zealand
- ODI shirt no.: 74
- T20I debut (cap 94): 28 July 2021 v West Indies
- Last T20I: 7 January 2026 v Sri Lanka
- T20I shirt no.: 74

Domestic team information
- Years: Team
- 2020/21–2023: Khyber Pakhtunkhwa
- 2021–2023: Islamabad United (squad no. 74 previously 19)
- 2024–2025: Quetta Gladiators (squad no. 74)
- 2024: Khulna Tigers
- 2026: Multan Sultans (squad no. 74)

Career statistics
Competition	Test	ODI	T20I	FC
Matches	2	22	29	11
Runs scored	55	81	46	263
Batting average	18.33	9.00	11.50	16.43
100s/50s	0/0	0/0	0/0	0/0
Top score	43	17*	12*	49
Balls bowled	358	1070	553	1343
Wickets	2	36	36	23
Bowling average	115.50	27.25	20.86	40.17
5 wickets in innings	0	0	0	0
10 wickets in match	0	0	0	0
Best bowling	1/71	4/36	4/24	4/65
Catches/stumpings	1/–	5/–	17/–	8/–
Medal record
Men's cricket
Representing Pakistan
Asia Cup
Runner-up	2025 UAE
Asian Games
Silver medal – second place	2026 Aichi–Nagoya
- Source: Cricinfo, 4 April 2025

Mohammad Wasim Jr. (Note: Urdu, Pashto: محمد وسیم جونیئر; pronounced [mʊɦəmməd wəsiːm]) (born 25 August 2001) is a Pakistani international cricketer who plays for the Pakistan national cricket team. He also plays for Multan Sultans in the Pakistan Super League.

== Early career ==
Mohammad Wasim Jr. was born into a Pashtun family of the Wazir tribe in North Waziristan, Khyber Pakhtunkhwa province, Pakistan. Due to the lack of facilities there, he had to move to the provincial capital Peshawar where he joined a cricket club before playing at district level and then at regional level, finally representing the Pakistan U19 team.

Wasim was part of Pakistan's squad for the 2020 Under-19 Cricket World Cup, replacing Naseem Shah who couldn't play for the U19 squad as he made his international debut.

== Domestic career ==
Wasim made his first-class debut on 26 November 2020, for Khyber Pakhtunkhwa, in the 2020–21 Quaid-e-Azam Trophy.

In January 2021, he was named in Khyber Pakhtunkhwa's squad for the 2020–21 Pakistan Cup. He made his List A debut on 18 January 2021, for Khyber Pakhtunkhwa, in the 2020–21 Pakistan Cup.

He made his Twenty20 debut on 21 February 2021, for Islamabad United in the 2021 Pakistan Super League (PSL).

In PSL Season 9 he played for Quetta Gladiators.

== International career ==
In March 2021, he was named in Pakistan's limited overs squads for their tours to South Africa and Zimbabwe.

In June 2021, he was also named in Pakistan's Twenty20 International (T20I) squad for the series against the West Indies. He made his T20I debut on 28 July 2021, for Pakistan against the West Indies, taking the wicket of Chris Gayle.

In September 2021, he was named in Pakistan's One Day International (ODI) squad for their series against New Zealand. Later the same month, he was named in Pakistan's squad for the 2021 ICC Men's T20 World Cup. In December 2021, he was again named in Pakistan's ODI squad, this time for their series against the West Indies.

In February 2022, Wasim was added to Pakistan's Test squad for the first match against Australia. The following month, Wasim was named in Pakistan's One Day International (ODI) squad, also for their series against Australia. He made his ODI debut on 29 March 2022, for Pakistan against Australia.

In December 2022, he made his Test debut for the Pakistan cricket team against England in the third Test. After missing out on a number of games, he was recalled to the Test team ahead of Pakistan's tour to Australia for a 3-match series.

In November 2025, in the third and final ODI of the home series against Sri Lanka, Wasim Jr delivered a key bowling performance that helped Pakistan seal a 3–0 series whitewash. He picked up crucial wickets, ending with 3/47 in 10 overs, as Sri Lanka were restricted to 211. Wasim's disciplined pace, use of targeting lengths and reverse-swing capability were noted as instrumental in breaking the opposition's rhythm before Pakistan sealed the chase comfortably. He was declared Player of the Match.

== Playing style ==
=== Bowling ===
As a right-arm fast bowler Wasim Jr. is noted for his distinctive side-on, sling-type action and a pronounced ability to bowl in death overs, where he frequently uses reverse swing and deceptive yorkers, as well his ability to rush in briskly and extract bounce due to his height, with his pace reaching up in the high 140s kph mark.

=== Fielding ===
On the fielding front, Wasim Jr has been credited with sharp anticipation and agile ground-fielding, regularly effecting boundary saves and contributing in the outfield.

== Personal life ==
On 26 June 2024, Muhammad Waseem was married in a private nikah ceremony at Masjid al-Haram in Mecca, Saudi Arabia.
