= 2022 Kashmir Premier League (Pakistan) squads =

Cricket league in Pakistan

Cities represented by KPL teams

This is a list of the squads of the seven franchise teams which will compete in the 2022 Kashmir Premier League, a 20-over cricket league. The draft took place on 21 July 2022 in Islamabad. The tournament will be held in Muzaffarabad.

== Key ==
- Players with international caps are listed in **bold**.
- Ages are correct as of 21 July 2022

== Bagh Stallions ==
No.	Name	Nationality	Birth date	Category	Batting style	Bowling style	Year signed	Notes
Batsmen
12	**Sohaib Maqsood**	Pakistan	15 April 1987 (aged 35)	Platinum	Right-handed	Right-arm off break	2022	
45	Hasan Raza	Pakistan	6 January 1995 (aged 27)	Kashmiri	Left-handed	Right-arm medium-fast	2022	
	Abdul Bangalzai	Pakistan	4 March 2003 (aged 19)	Supplementary	Right-handed		2022	
All-rounders
8	**Umar Amin**	Pakistan	16 October 1989 (aged 32)	Diamond	Left-handed	Right-arm medium	2022	Captain
10	Sharoon Siraj	Pakistan	14 September 1997 (aged 24)	Silver	Right-handed	Right-arm off spin	2022	
34	**Aamer Yamin**	Pakistan	26 June 1990 (aged 32)	Diamond	Right-handed	Right-arm medium	2021	
41	Aamer Jamal	Pakistan	5 July 1996 (aged 26)	Silver	Right-handed	Right-arm off break	2022	Replacement pick
65	Kashif Bhatti	Pakistan	25 July 1986 (aged 35)	Gold	Right-handed	Left-arm orthodox	2022	
	Atizaz Habib Khan	Pakistan	1 March 1997 (aged 25)	Silver	Right-handed	Right-arm off spin	2022	
	Mohammad Sarwar	Pakistan	20 January 1995 (aged 27)	Silver	Right-handed	Right-arm fast-medium	2022	
Wicket-keepers
23	**Kamran Akmal**	Pakistan	13 January 1982 (aged 40)	Icon	Right-handed		2022	
	Awais Akram	Pakistan	10 March 2000 (aged 22)	Kashmiri	Right-handed		2022	Replacement pick
	Sajjad Ali	Pakistan	3 February 1990 (aged 32)	Emerging	Right-handed		2022	
Bowlers
9	Arsalan Arif	Pakistan	5 January 1993 (aged 29)	Kashmiri	Left-handed	Slow left-arm orthodox	2022	
11	**Rumman Raees**	Pakistan	18 October 1991 (aged 30)	Platinum	Right-handed	Left-arm fast-medium	2022	Vice-captain
14	Mohammad Imran	Pakistan	20 January 2001 (aged 21)	Gold	Right-handed	Left-arm fast-medium	2021	
26	Danyal Allah Ditta	Pakistan	2 July 1995 (aged 27)	Kashmiri	Left-handed	Left-arm slow left-arm orthodox	2022	
55	Maaz Khan	Pakistan	15 December 2000 (aged 21)	Emerging	Right-handed	Right-arm leg spin	2022	
	Ahmed Jamal	Pakistan	3 September 1988 (aged 33)	Silver	Right-handed	Right-arm medium	2022	
	Ali Majid	Pakistan	29 December 1991 (aged 30)	Supplementary	Right-handed	Right-arm medium-fast	2022	
	Amir Shehzad	Pakistan	9 December 1983 (aged 38)	Kashmiri	Right-handed	Right-arm medium-fast	2022	

== Jammu Janbaz ==
No.	Name	Nationality	Birth date	Category	Batting style	Bowling style	Year signed	Notes
Batsmen
9	Samiullah Afridi	Pakistan	11 November 1996 (aged 25)	Emerging	Right-handed	Leg spin	2022	
51	**Sahibzada Farhan**	Pakistan	6 March 1996 (aged 26)	Diamond	Right-handed		2022	
96	**Umar Akmal**	Pakistan	26 May 1990 (aged 32)	Diamond	Right-handed	Off spin	2022	
98	**Sharjeel Khan**	Pakistan	14 August 1989 (aged 32)	Icon	Left-handed	Leg spin	2022	
	Umar Siddiq	Pakistan	10 October 2000 (aged 21)	Silver	Left-handed	Off spin	2022	
All-rounders
10	**Shahid Afridi**	Pakistan	1 March 1977 (aged 45)	Platinum	Right-handed	Leg spin	2022	Mentor
41	**Faheem Ashraf**	Pakistan	16 January 1994 (aged 28)	Platinum	Left-handed	Right-arm fast medium	2022	Captain
	Ahmed Khan	Pakistan	1 May 2004 (aged 18)	Silver	Right-handed	Right-arm medium	2022	
	Akash Afridi	Pakistan	16 March 1992 (aged 30)	Supplementary	Right-handed	Right-arm fast-medium	2022	
	Azaz Khan	Pakistan	22 September 1984 (aged 37)	Supplementary	Right-handed		2022	
	Mohammad Shehzad	Pakistan	30 September 1990 (aged 31)	Kashmiri	Right-handed		2022	
Wicket-keepers
75	Shahzaib	Pakistan		Silver			2022	
Bowlers
8	Faisal Altaf	United Arab Emirates	15 March 2001 (aged 21)	Kashmiri	Right-handed	Right-arm fast-medium	2022	
11	Mehran Mumtaz	Pakistan	7 March 2003 (aged 19)	Kashmiri	Right-handed	Right-arm medium-fast	2022	
17	**Imran Khan**	Pakistan	15 July 1987 (aged 35)	Silver	Right-handed	Right-arm fast-medium	2022	
23	Usama Mir	Pakistan	23 December 1995 (aged 26)	Gold	Right-handed	Leg spin	2022	
88	Akif Javed	Pakistan	10 October 2000 (aged 21)	Gold	Right-handed	Left-arm medium-fast	2022	
	Hamza Shah Afridi	Pakistan	26 October 2002 (aged 19)	Emerging	Right-handed	Right-arm medium-fast	2022	
	Najam Naseer Kiyani	Pakistan	2 October 2001 (aged 20)	Kashmiri	Left-handed	Left-arm unorthodox spin	2022	
	Naqash Basharat	Pakistan	4 April 1992 (aged 30)	Kashmiri	Left-handed	Left-arm medium-fast	2022	

== Kotli Lions ==
No.	Name	Nationality	Birth date	Category	Batting style	Bowling style	Year signed	Notes
Batsmen
6	Imran Shah	Pakistan	16 June 1999 (aged 23)	Emerging	Right-handed		2022	
12	**Ahsan Ali**	Pakistan	10 December 1993 (aged 28)	Diamond	Right-handed	Leg break	2021	
18	Naveed Malik	Pakistan	18 March 1995 (aged 27)	Kashmiri	Right-handed	Right-arm medium-fast	2022	
42	**Khurram Manzoor**	Pakistan	10 June 1986 (aged 36)	Icon	Right-handed	Right-arm off spin	2022	Captain
44	Khalid Usman	Pakistan	1 March 1986 (aged 36)	Gold	Right-handed	Left-arm orthodox spin	2021	
100	Omair Yousuf	Pakistan	27 December 1998 (aged 23)		Right-handed		2022	Post-draft signing
	Hanif Azad	Pakistan	7 August 1997 (aged 24)	Silver	Right-handed		2022	
All-rounders
17	Hasan Mohsin	Pakistan	11 January 1998 (aged 24)	Silver	Right-handed	Right-arm medium	2022	
22	**Danish Aziz**	Pakistan	20 November 1995 (aged 26)	Platinum	Left-handed	Slow left-arm orthodox	2022	
	Basit Ali	Pakistan		Kashmiri			2022	
	Mirwais Khan	Pakistan	4 May 1991 (aged 31)		Right-handed	Right-arm medium-fast	2022	Post-draft signing
Wicket-keepers
54	**Sarfaraz Ahmed**	Pakistan	22 May 1987 (aged 35)	Platinum	Right-handed	Right-arm off spin	2022	
	Abdul Rehman	Pakistan		Supplementary			2021	
Bowlers
03	Mujtaba Ghayas	Pakistan	27 July 1987 (aged 34)	Kashmiri	Right-handed	Right-arm medium	2021	
5	Nadeem Khalil	Pakistan	1 November 1997 (aged 24)	Kashmiri	Right-handed	Right-arm fast-medium	2021	
8	Khurram Shehzad	Pakistan	25 November 1999 (aged 22)	Diamond	Right-handed	Right-arm medium	2021	
16	Hassan Khan	Pakistan	16 October 1998 (aged 23)	Silver	Right-handed	Left-arm orthodox	2022	
23	Irfan Ali Qasmi	Pakistan		Emerging	Right-handed	Leg spin	2022	
97	Irfanullah Shah	Pakistan	5 May 1995 (aged 27)	Gold	Right-handed	Right-arm medium-fast	2021	
	Mushtaq Kalhoro	Pakistan	13 March 1997 (aged 25)	Silver	Right-handed	Right-arm medium-fast	2022	
	Zayyan Khan	Pakistan		Kashmiri			2022	

== Mirpur Royals ==
No.	Name	Nationality	Birth date	Category	Batting style	Bowling style	Year signed	Notes
Batsmen
77	Hassan Nawaz	Pakistan	23 January 1992 (aged 30)	Emerging	Right-handed	Right-arm fast-medium	2022	
	Arsalan Mehzood	Pakistan	6 June 1998 (aged 24)		Right-handed		2022	Post-draft signing
	Hamza Arshad	Pakistan	15 March 1995 (aged 27)	Silver	Left-handed	Slow left-arm orthodox	2022	
	Shan Khan	Pakistan	1 June 2003 (aged 19)	Kashmiri	Right-handed	Right-arm medium-fast	2022	
	Zaid Alam	Pakistan	24 December 1999 (aged 22)	Silver	Right-handed	Right-arm fast-medium	2022	
All-rounders
9	**Imad Wasim**	Pakistan	18 December 1988 (aged 33)	Platinum	Left-handed	Slow left-arm orthodox	2022	
18	**Shoaib Malik**	Pakistan	1 February 1982 (aged 40)	Icon	Right-handed	Right-arm off spin	2021	Captain
89	**Haris Sohail**	Pakistan	9 January 1989 (aged 33)	Platinum	Left-handed	Slow left-arm orthodox	2022	
	Ali Imran	Pakistan	25 February 1998 (aged 24)	Diamond	Right-handed	Slow left-arm orthodox	2022	
	Ali Razzaq	Pakistan		Emerging	Right-handed	Right-arm medium-fast	2022	
	Umar Hayat	Pakistan	20 January 2001 (aged 21)	Kashmiri	Right-handed	Off spin	2022	
Wicket-keepers
27	Raza-ul-Mustafa	Pakistan	27 December 2003 (aged 18)	Supplementary	Right-handed		2022	
61	Muhammad Akhlaq	Pakistan	12 November 1992 (aged 29)	Gold	Right-handed	Right-arm medium-fast	2021	
Bowlers
7	Abrar Ahmed	Pakistan	16 October 1998 (aged 23)	Gold	Left-handed	Left-arm leg break	2021	
38	Shadab Majeed	Pakistan	7 June 1997 (aged 25)	Kashmiri	Right-handed	Right-arm medium fast	2021	
41	Kashif Ali	Pakistan	4 October 2002 (aged 19)	Silver	Right-handed	Right-arm medium	2022	
66	Izhar-ul-Haq	Pakistan	6 April 2007 (aged 15)	Kashmiri	Right-handed	Right-arm medium-fast	2022	Post-draft signing
82	Sufiyan Muqeem	Pakistan		Kashmiri			2022	
86	**Yasir Shah**	Pakistan	2 May 1986 (aged 36)	Supplementary	Right-handed	Leg spin	2022	
99	Salman Irshad	Pakistan	3 December 1995 (aged 26)	Diamond	Right-handed	Right-arm fast	2021	
	Faizan Saleem	Pakistan		Kashmiri	Right-handed	Right-arm medium	2022	
	Zubair Lodhi	Pakistan	20 June 1996 (aged 26)	Silver	Right-handed	Right-arm medium-fast	2022	

== Muzaffarabad Tigers ==
No.	Name	Nationality	Birth date	Category	Batting style	Bowling style	Year signed	Notes
Batsmen
5	Usman Maroof	Pakistan	1 January 1996 (aged 26)	Kashmiri	Right-handed	Right-arm medium-fast	2022	
47	**Aqib Ilyas**	Oman	5 September 1992 (aged 29)	Overseas Kashmiri	Right-handed	Off spin	2022	
75	Taimoor Sultan	Pakistan	4 December 1994 (aged 27)	Silver	Right-handed		2021	
77	Salman Fayyaz	Pakistan	11 August 1997 (aged 24)	Silver	Left-handed	Leg spin	2022	
All-rounders
7	Inzamam-ul-Haq	Pakistan	22 July 1997 (aged 24)	Kashmiri	Right-handed	Slow left arm orthodox	2021	
8	**Mohammad Hafeez**	Pakistan	17 October 1980 (aged 41)	Icon	Right-handed	Right-arm off break	2021	Captain
10	**Saad Bin Zafar**	Canada	10 November 1986 (aged 35)	Overseas Kashmiri	Left-handed	Slow left-arm orthodox	2022	
33	**Sohail Tanvir**	Pakistan	1 December 1984 (aged 37)	Platinum	Left-handed	Left-arm medium-fast	2021	
48	**Anwar Ali**	Pakistan	25 November 1987 (aged 34)	Diamond	Right-handed	Right-arm fast-medium	2021	
95	**Iftikhar Ahmed**	Pakistan	3 September 1990 (aged 31)	Platinum	Right-handed	Right-arm off break	2022	
Wicket-keepers
13	Haseebullah Khan	Pakistan	4 March 2004 (aged 18)	Diamond	Left-handed		2022	
60	Zeeshan Ashraf	Pakistan	11 May 1992 (aged 30)	Gold	Left-handed	Right-arm off break	2021	
	Ameer Hamza	Pakistan	22 September 1995 (aged 26)	Supplementary	Right-handed		2022	
Bowlers
9	Amir Khan	Pakistan	9 September 2001 (aged 20)	Emerging	Right-handed	Right-arm medium-fast	2022	
14	Ahmed Daniyal	Pakistan	3 July 1997 (aged 25)	Supplementary	Right-handed	Right-arm medium-fast	2022	
35	**Arshad Iqbal**	Pakistan	26 December 2000 (aged 21)	Gold	Right-handed	Right-arm medium-fast	2021	
42	Aaqib Liaquat	Pakistan	28 May 2001 (aged 21)	Emerging	Right-handed	Leg spin	2022	
92	**Mir Hamza**	Pakistan	10 September 1992 (aged 29)	Silver	Left-handed	Left-arm fast-medium	2022	
	Ahmed Safi Abdullah	Pakistan	1 March 1998 (aged 24)	Silver	Left-handed	Slow left-arm orthodox	2022	
	Osama Fazil	Pakistan		Kashmiri		Right-arm fast	2022	

== Overseas Warriors ==
No.	Name	Nationality	Birth date	Category	Batting style	Bowling style	Year signed	Notes
Batsmen
1	Malik Nisar	Pakistan		Kashmiri	Right-handed	Right-arm medium	2022	
81	**Asad Shafiq**	Pakistan	28 January 1986 (aged 36)	Icon	Right-handed	Right-arm off break	2022	Captain
	Hanan Ahmed	Pakistan		Kashmiri			2022	
	Khawaja Nafay	Pakistan	13 February 2002 (aged 20)	Emerging	Right-handed	Right-arm off break	2022	
	Hashim Ali	Pakistan		Kashmiri	Left-handed		2022	
All-rounders
15	Saif Badar	Pakistan	3 July 1998 (aged 24)	Gold	Right-handed	Leg break	2022	
27	Muhammad Shehzad	Pakistan	5 February 2004 (aged 18)	Silver	Right-handed	Right-arm medium-fast	2022	
29	Mohammad Imran	Pakistan	25 December 1996 (aged 25)	Diamond	Right-handed	Right-arm medium fast	2022	
31	**Bilal Asif**	Pakistan	24 September 1985 (aged 36)	Silver	Right-handed	Off spin	2022	
77	Adil Amin	Pakistan	13 December 1990 (aged 31)	Silver	Right-handed	Off spin	2022	
98	Kamran Ghulam	Pakistan	10 October 1995 (aged 26)	Platinum	Right-handed	Slow left-arm orthodox	2021	
	Nosherwan Ibrahim	Pakistan					2022	Post-draft signing
	Umer Zeeshan	United Arab Emirates		Emerging	Right-handed	Right-arm medium	2022	
Wicket-keepers
23	**Azam Khan**	Pakistan	10 August 1998 (aged 23)	Platinum	Right-handed		2021	
Bowlers
13	**Umaid Asif**	Pakistan	30 March 1984 (aged 38)	Gold	Right-handed	Right-arm medium-fast	2022	
14	**Sohail Khan**	Pakistan	6 March 1984 (aged 38)	Diamond	Right-handed	Right-arm fast	2021	
	Ali Shafiq	Pakistan	16 November 1996 (aged 25)	Silver	Right-handed	Right-arm medium-fast	2022	
	Farhan Shafiq	Pakistan	5 December 1999 (aged 22)	Kashmiri	Left-handed	Slow left-arm orthodox	2022	
	Saad Asif	Pakistan		Kashmiri			2022	
	Sameer Khan	Pakistan	21 October 2006 (aged 15)	Supplementary	Left-handed	Slow left-arm orthodox	2022	
	Shayan Raza	Pakistan	19 September 2006 (aged 15)	Supplementary	Left-handed	Slow left-arm orthodox	2022	

== Rawalakot Hawks ==
No.	Name	Nationality	Birth date	Category	Batting style	Bowling style	Year signed	Notes
Batsmen
6	Babar Khaliq	Pakistan	3 February 1991 (aged 31)	Kashmiri	Right-handed	Off spin	2022	Replacement pick
7	**Ahmed Shehzad**	Pakistan	23 November 1991 (aged 30)	Platinum	Right-handed	Right-arm leg break	2021	
27	Kashif Ali	England	7 February 1998 (aged 24)	Kashmiri	Right-handed	Leg spin	2021	
	Ammad Alam	Pakistan	3 October 1998 (aged 23)	Silver	Right-handed		2022	
	Musadiq Ahmed	Pakistan	1 May 1989 (aged 33)	Silver	Right-handed		2022	
	Saeedullah	Pakistan		Emerging			2022	
	Zeeshan Malik	Pakistan	26 December 1996 (aged 25)	Silver	Right-handed	Off spin	2022	
All-rounders
12	**Hussain Talat**	Pakistan	12 February 1996 (aged 26)	Platinum	Right-handed	Right-arm fast-medium	2021	
15	Sohail Akhtar	Pakistan	2 March 1986 (aged 36)	Supplementary	Right-handed	Right-arm medium	2022	
37	Amad Butt	Pakistan	10 June 1995 (aged 27)	Gold	Right-handed	Right-arm fast	2022	
65	Asif Afridi	Pakistan	25 December 1986 (aged 35)	Diamond	Left-handed	Slow left-arm orthodox	2021	
	Khawaja Muhammad Bilal	Pakistan		Kashmiri			2022	Replacement pick
	Saif Zaib	England	22 May 1998 (aged 24)	Kashmiri	Left-handed	Slow left-arm orthodox	2022	
Wicket-keepers
18	Rohail Nazir	Pakistan	10 October 2001 (aged 20)	Kashmiri	Right-handed		2022	Replacement pick
29	Bismillah Khan	Pakistan	1 March 1990 (aged 32)	Gold	Right-handed		2021	
	Raja Farhan Khan	Pakistan		Kashmiri			2022	
Bowlers
1	Sameen Gul	Pakistan	4 February 1999 (aged 23)	Supplementary	Right-handed	Right-arm medium	2022	
5	**Mohammad Amir**	Pakistan	13 March 1992 (aged 30)	Icon	Left-handed	Left-arm fast	2022	
9	Faisal Akram	Pakistan	20 August 2003 (aged 18)	Silver	Left-handed	Left-arm unorthodox spin	2022	
50	Ihsanullah	Pakistan	11 October 2002 (aged 19)	Emerging	Right-handed	Right-arm fast	2022	
99	Zaman Khan	Pakistan	10 September 2001 (aged 20)	Diamond	Right-handed	Right-arm fast-medium	2021	
	Atif Sheikh	England	18 February 1991 (aged 31)	Kashmiri	Right-handed	Left-arm medium-fast	2022	
	Rohaan Qadri	Pakistan		Kashmiri		Leg spin	2022	Replacement pick
	Zain-ul-Hassan	England	28 October 2000 (aged 21)	Kashmiri	Left-handed	Right-arm medium	2022	
