= 2022 Kashmir Premier League (Pakistan) players draft =

List of cricketers

2022 KPL Draft

General information
- Sport: Cricket
- Date: 21 July 2022
- Location: Aura Grande Enclave; Islamabad, Pakistan

Overview
- League: Kashmir Premier League
- Teams: 7
- First selection: Faheem Ashraf, Jammu Janbaz

The players draft for the 2022 Kashmir Premier League in Azad Kashmir took place on 21 July 2022. The players were divided into 7 categories: Icon, Platinum, Diamond, Gold, Silver, Emerging and Kashmiri. Each team chose 2 platinum players, 2 diamond players, 2 gold players, 4 silver players, 2 emerging players and 5 Kashmiri players. The 2022 KPL did not feature foreign players.

== Key ==
Symbol	Meaning
†	Player was traded
♠	Player was part of the base squad of their team

== Background ==
All franchises announced their icon players prior to the draft. Kamran Akmal was announced as Bagh Stallions’ icon player. Sharjeel Khan was announced as Jammu Janbaz’s icon player. Former Pakistani captain, Sarfaraz Ahmed, was announced as Kotli Lions’ captain. Mirpur Royals retained Shoaib Malik as their icon player. Muzaffarabad Tigers also retained Mohammad Hafeez as their icon player. Overseas Warriors selected Asad Shafiq as their icon player. Rawalakot Hawks announced that Mohammad Amir would be their icon player. The PCB was giving permission to draft foreign players who retired at least 5 years ago but the franchises were not interested in drafting them. The KPL president, Arif Malik, confirmed that the centrally contracted players chosen for the Netherlands tour would not participate in the KPL but they were requesting if the remaining contracted players could play. The PCB later allowed Fawad Alam, Azhar Ali, Abid Ali, Nauman Ali, Haseebullah, Mohammad Huraira and Ali Usman to participate in the tournament. Later, Sarfaraz Ahmed was also granted permission to play in the KPL. Khurram Manzoor was announced as Kotli Lions’ icon player.

== Base squads ==
Each franchise released a “Base Squad” prior to the draft. These were the 4-5 players that each franchise was retaining. Muzaffarabad Tigers and Bagh Stallions traded Sohaib Maqsood for Iftikhar Ahmed in their base squads.

Bagh Stallions	Jammu Janbaz	Kotli Lions	Mirpur Royals	Muzaffarabad Tigers	Overseas Warriors	Rawalakot Hawks
Kamran Akmal (Icon); Sohaib Maqsood† (Platinum); Aamer Yamin (Diamond); Mohammad Imran (Gold)	Sharjeel Khan (Icon); Shahid Afridi (Platinum); Sahibzada Farhan (Diamond); Umar Akmal (Diamond); Mehran Mumtaz (Kashmiri)	Khurram Manzoor (Icon); Ahsan Ali (Diamond); Khurram Shahzad (Diamond); Irfanullah Shah (Gold); Khalid Usman (Gold)	Shoaib Malik (Icon); Salman Irshad (Diamond); Muhammad Akhlaq (Gold); Abrar Ahmed (Gold)	Mohammad Hafeez (Icon); Iftikhar Ahmed† (Platinum); Anwar Ali (Diamond); Zeeshan Ashraf (Gold); Arshad Iqbal (Gold)	Asad Shafiq (Icon); Azam Khan (Platinum); Kamran Ghulam (Platinum); Sohail Khan (Diamond)	Mohammad Amir (Icon); Ahmed Shehzad (Platinum); Hussain Talat (Platinum); Zaman Khan (Diamond); Asif Afridi (Diamond)

== Picks ==
Every team had a “Wild Card” which allowed them to move a player’s category up by one or two categories. Each team also had a “Right to Match” card which allowed them to change a player’s category to the one they are picked in instead of the one they were listed in.

Category	Pick No.	Team	Player
Platinum	1	Jammu Janbaz	Faheem Ashraf
Platinum	2	Rawalakot Hawks	Ahmed Shehzad
Platinum	3	Mirpur Royals	Imad Wasim
Platinum	4	Overseas Warriors	Azam Khan
Platinum	5	Bagh Stallions	Rumman Raees
Platinum	6	Kotli Lions	Danish Aziz
Platinum	7	Muzaffarabad Tigers	Sohail Tanvir
Platinum	8	Muzaffarabad Tigers	Iftikhar Ahmed
Platinum	9	Kotli Lions	Sarfaraz Ahmed
Platinum	10	Bagh Stallions	Sohaib Maqsood
Platinum	11	Overseas Warriors	Kamran Ghulam
Platinum	12	Mirpur Royals	Haris Sohail
Platinum	13	Rawalakot Hawks	Hussain Talat
Platinum	14	Jammu Janbaz	Shahid Afridi
Diamond	1	Bagh Stallions	Umar Amin
Diamond	2	Kotli Lions	Ahsan Ali
Diamond	3	Muzaffarabad Tigers	Haseebullah Khan
Diamond	4	Jammu Janbaz	Umar Akmal
Diamond	5	Rawalakot Hawks	Asif Afridi
Diamond	6	Mirpur Royals	Ali Imran
Diamond	7	Overseas Warriors	Imran Randhawa
Diamond	8	Overseas Warriors	Sohail Khan
Diamond	9	Mirpur Royals	Salman Irshad
Diamond	10	Rawalakot Hawks	Zaman Khan
Diamond	11	Jammu Janbaz	Sahibzada Farhan
Diamond	12	Muzaffarabad Tigers	Anwar Ali
Diamond	13	Kotli Lions	Khurram Shehzad
Diamond	14	Bagh Stallions	Aamer Yamin
Gold	1	Kotli Lions	Irfanullah Shah
Gold	2	Overseas Warriors	Umaid Asif
Gold	3	Bagh Stallions	Kashif Bhatti
Gold	4	Jammu Janbaz	Usama Mir
Gold	5	Mirpur Royals	Abrar Ahmed
Gold	6	Rawalakot Hawks	Amad Butt
Gold	7	Muzaffarabad Tigers	Zeeshan Ashraf
Gold	8	Mirpur Royals	Muhammad Akhlaq
Gold	9	Muzaffarabad Tigers	Arshad Iqbal
Gold	10	Overseas Warriors	Saif Badar
Gold	11	Bagh Stallions	Mohammad Imran
Gold	12	Rawalakot Hawks	Bismillah Khan
Gold	13	Jammu Janbaz	Akif Javed
Gold	14	Kotli Lions	Khalid Usman
Silver	1	Rawalakot Hawks	Zeeshan Malik
Silver	2	Jammu Janbaz	Imran Khan
Silver	3	Muzaffarabad Tigers	Mir Hamza
Silver	4	Kotli Lions	Mushtaq Kalhoro
Silver	5	Bagh Stallions	Mohammad Sarwar
Silver	6	Mirpur Royals	Kashif Ali
Silver	7	Overseas Warriors	Adil Amin
Silver	8	Rawalakot Hawks	Musadiq Ahmed
Silver	9	Jammu Janbaz	Umar Siddiq
Silver	10	Muzaffarabad Tigers	Ahmed Safi Abdullah
Silver	11	Kotli Lions	Hassan Khan
Silver	12	Bagh Stallions	Sharoon Siraj
Silver	13	Mirpur Royals	Hamza Arshad
Silver	14	Overseas Warriors	Bilal Asif
Silver	15	Mirpur Royals	Zubair Lodhi
Silver	16	Muzaffarabad Tigers	Salman Fayyaz
Silver	17	Overseas Warriors	Ali Shafiq
Silver	18	Bagh Stallions	Ahmed Jamal
Silver	19	Rawalakot Hawks	Faisal Akram
Silver	20	Jammu Janbaz	Ahmed Khan
Silver	21	Kotli Lions	Hanif Azad
Silver	22	Kotli Lions	Hasan Mohsin
Silver	23	Overseas Warriors	Muhammad Shehzad
Silver	24	Bagh Stallions	Atizaz Habib Khan
Silver	25	Jammu Janbaz	Shahzab
Silver	26	Mirpur Royals	Zaid Alam
Silver	27	Rawalakot Hawks	Ammad Alam
Silver	28	Muzaffarabad Tigers	Taimoor Sultan
Emerging	1	Overseas Warriors	Umer Zeeshan
Emerging	2	Mirpur Royals	Hassan Nawaz
Emerging	3	Rawalakot Hawks	Saeedullah
Emerging	4	Jammu Janbaz	Hamza Shah Afridi
Emerging	5	Muzaffarabad Tigers	Aaqib Liaquat
Emerging	6	Kotli Lions	Imran Shah
Emerging	7	Bagh Stallions	Maaz Khan
Emerging	8	Bagh Stallions	Sajjad Ali
Emerging	9	Kotli Lions	Irfan Ali Qasmi
Emerging	10	Muzaffarabad Tigers	Amir Khan
Emerging	11	Jammu Janbaz	Samiullah Afridi
Emerging	12	Rawalakot Hawks	Ihsanullah
Emerging	13	Mirpur Royals	Ali Razzaq
Emerging	14	Overseas Warriors	Khawaja Muhammad
Kashmiri	1	Overseas Warriors	Farhan Shafiq
Kashmiri	2	Mirpur Royals	Shadab Majeed
Kashmiri	3	Rawalakot Hawks	Zain-ul-Hassan
Kashmiri	4	Jammu Janbaz	Mehran Mumtaz
Kashmiri	5	Muzaffarabad Tigers	Aqib Ilyas
Kashmiri	6	Kotli Lions	Zayyan Khan
Kashmiri	7	Bagh Stallions	Hasan Raza
Kashmiri	8	Kotli Lions	Basit Ali
Kashmiri	9	Jammu Janbaz	Naqash Basharat
Kashmiri	10	Muzaffarabad Tigers	Saad Bin Zafar
Kashmiri	11	Bagh Stallions	Daniyal Allah Ditta
Kashmiri	12	Mirpur Royals	Sufyan Moqim
Kashmiri	13	Overseas Warriors	Hannan Ahmed
Kashmiri	14	Rawalakot Hawks	Saif Ali Zaib
Kashmiri	15	Muzaffarabad Tigers	Inzamam-ul-Haq
Kashmiri	16	Mirpur Royals	Shan Khan
Kashmiri	17	Jammu Janbaz	Faisal Altaf
Kashmiri	18	Overseas Warriors	Syed Hashim Ali
Kashmiri	19	Rawalakot Hawks	Atif Sheikh
Kashmiri	20	Kotli Lions	Naveed Malik
Kashmiri	21	Bagh Stallions	Aamir Shehzad
Kashmiri	22	Jammu Janbaz	Najam Naseer Kiyani
Kashmiri	23	Mirpur Royals	Umar Hayat
Kashmiri	24	Bagh Stallions	Arsalan Arif
Kashmiri	25	Rawalakot Hawks	Raja Farhan Khan
Kashmiri	26	Overseas Warriors	Saad Asif
Kashmiri	27	Muzaffarabad Tigers	Usman Maroof
Kashmiri	28	Kotli Lions	Mujtaba Ghayas
Kashmiri	29	Mirpur Royals	Faizan Saleem
Kashmiri	30	Kotli Lions	Nadeem Khalil
Kashmiri	31	Bagh Stallions	Raja Farhan
Kashmiri	32	Overseas Warriors	Malik Nisar
Kashmiri	33	Rawalakot Hawks	Kashif Ali
Kashmiri	34	Muzaffarabad Tigers	Usama Fazal
Kashmiri	35	Jammu Janbaz	Muhammad Shehzad

=== Supplementary draft ===
A supplementary draft was also held. Each team was allowed to select two supplementary players. The following are the picks:

Team	Player
Bagh Stallions	Ali Majid; Abdul Bangalzai
Jammu Janbaz	Azaz Khan; Akash Afridi
Kotli Lions	Abdul Rehman
Mirpur Royals	Yasir Shah; Raza-ul-Mustafa
Muzaffarabad Tigers	Ahmed Daniyal; Ameer Hamza
Overseas Warriors	Muhammad Sameer; Shayan Raza
Rawalakot Hawks	Sohail Akhtar; Sameen Gul

== Draft summary ==
Category	Bagh Stallions	Jammu Janbaz	Kotli Lions	Mirpur Royals	Muzaffarabad Tigers	Overseas Warriors	Rawalakot Hawks
Icon	(Pakistan) Kamran Akmal	(Pakistan) Sharjeel Khan	(Pakistan) Khurram Manzoor	(Pakistan) Shoaib Malik	(Pakistan) Mohammad Hafeez	(Pakistan) Asad Shafiq	(Pakistan) Mohammad Amir
Platinum	(Pakistan) Rumman Raees; (Pakistan) Sohaib Maqsood	(Pakistan) Faheem Ashraf; (Pakistan) Shahid Afridi	(Pakistan) Danish Aziz; (Pakistan) Sarfaraz Ahmed	(Pakistan) Haris Sohail; (Pakistan) Imad Wasim	(Pakistan) Iftikhar Ahmed; (Pakistan) Sohail Tanvir	(Pakistan) Azam Khan; (Pakistan) Kamran Ghulam	(Pakistan) Ahmed Shehzad; (Pakistan) Hussain Talat
Diamond	(Pakistan) Aamer Yamin; (Pakistan) Umar Amin	(Pakistan) Sahibzada Farhan; (Pakistan) Umar Akmal	(Pakistan) Ahsan Ali; (Pakistan) Khurram Shehzad	(Pakistan) Ali Imran; (Pakistan) Salman Irshad	(Pakistan) Anwar Ali; (Pakistan) Haseebullah Khan	(Pakistan) Mohammad Imran; (Pakistan) Sohail Khan	(Pakistan) Zaman Khan; (Pakistan) Asif Afridi
Gold	(Pakistan) Mohammad Imran; (Pakistan) Kashif Bhatti	(Pakistan) Akif Javed; (Pakistan) Usama Mir	(Pakistan) Irfanullah Shah; (Pakistan) Khalid Usman	(Pakistan) Muhammad Akhlaq; (Pakistan) Abrar Ahmed	(Pakistan) Arshad Iqbal; (Pakistan) Zeeshan Ashraf	(Pakistan) Saif Badar; (Pakistan) Umaid Asif	(Pakistan) Amad Butt; (Pakistan) Bismillah Khan
Silver	(Pakistan) Ahmed Jamal; (Pakistan) Atizaz Habib Khan; (Pakistan) Mohammad Sarwar; (Pakistan) Sharoon Siraj	(Pakistan) Ahmed Khan; (Pakistan) Imran Khan; (Pakistan) Shahzab; (Pakistan) Umar Siddiq	(Pakistan) Hanif Azad; (Pakistan) Hassan Khan; (Pakistan) Hasan Mohsin; (Pakistan) Mushtaq Kalhoro	(Pakistan) Hamza Arshad; (Pakistan) Kashif Ali; (Pakistan) Zaid Alam; (Pakistan) Zubair Lodhi	(Pakistan) Ahmed Safi Abdullah; (Pakistan) Mir Hamza; (Pakistan) Salman Fayyaz; (Pakistan) Taimoor Sultan	(Pakistan) Adil Amin; (Pakistan) Ali Shafiq; (Pakistan) Bilal Asif; (Pakistan) Muhammad Shehzad	(Pakistan) Ammad Alam; (Pakistan) Faisal Akram; (Pakistan) Musadiq Ahmed; (Pakistan) Zeeshan Malik
Emerging	(Pakistan) Maaz Khan; (Pakistan) Sajjad Ali	(Pakistan) Hamza Shah Afridi; (Pakistan) Samiullah	(Pakistan) Imran Shah; (Pakistan) Irfan Ali Qasmi	(Pakistan) Ali Razzaq; (Pakistan) Hassan Nawaz	(Pakistan) Aaqib Liaquat; (Pakistan) Amir Khan	(Pakistan) Khawaja Muhammad; (United Arab Emirates) Umer Zeeshan	(Pakistan) Saeedullah; (Pakistan) Ihsanullah
Kashmiri	(Pakistan) Amir Shehzad; (Pakistan) Arsalan Arif; (Pakistan) Danyal Allah Ditta; (Pakistan) Hasan Raza; (Pakistan) Raja Farhan	(United Arab Emirates) Faisal Altaf; (Pakistan) Mehran Mumtaz; (Pakistan) Mohammad Shehzad; (Pakistan) Naqash Basharat; (Pakistan) Najam Naseer Kiyani	(Pakistan) Basit Ali; (Pakistan) Mujtaba Ghayas; (Pakistan) Nadeem Khalil; (Pakistan) Naveed Malik; (Pakistan) Zayyan Khan	(Pakistan) Faizan Saleem; (Pakistan) Shadab Majeed; (Pakistan) Shan Khan; (Pakistan) Sufyan Moqeem; (Pakistan) Umar Hayat	(Oman) Aqib Ilyas; (Pakistan) Inzamam-ul-Haq; (Pakistan) Osama Fazil; (Canada) Saad Bin Zafar; (Pakistan) Usman Maroof	(Pakistan) Farhan Shafiq; (Pakistan) Hanan Ahmed; (Pakistan) Hashim Ali; (Pakistan) Malik Nisar; (Pakistan) Saad Asif	(England) Atif Sheikh; (England) Kashif Ali; (Pakistan) Raja Farhan Khan; (England) Saif Zaib; (England) Zain-ul-Hassan
Supplementary	(Pakistan) Ali Majid; (Pakistan) Abdul Bangalzai	(Pakistan) Azaz Khan; (Pakistan) Akash Afridi	(Pakistan) Abdul Rehman	(Pakistan) Yasir Shah; (Pakistan) Raza-ul-Mustafa	(Pakistan) Ahmed Daniyal; (Pakistan) Ameer Hamza	(Pakistan) Muhammad Sameer; (Pakistan) Shayan Raza	(Pakistan) Sohail Akhtar; (Pakistan) Sameen Gul

== Post-draft signings ==
Player	Team
(Pakistan) Omair Yousuf	Kotli Lions
(Pakistan) Mirwais Khan	Kotli Lions
(Pakistan) Arsalan Mehzood	Mirpur Royals
(Pakistan) Izhar-ul-Haq	Mirpur Royals
(Pakistan) Nosherwan Ibrahim	Overseas Warriors

=== Replacements ===
Player	Team	Replaced with
(Pakistan) Ahmed Jamal	Bagh Stallions	(Pakistan) Aamer Jamal
(Pakistan) Raja Farhan Khan	Bagh Stallions	(Pakistan) Awais Akram
(England) Atif Sheikh	Rawalakot Hawks	(Pakistan) Babar Khaliq
(England) Kashif Ali	Rawalakot Hawks	(Pakistan) Khawaja Muhammad Bilal
(England) Saif Zaib	Rawalakot Hawks	(Pakistan) Rohaan Qadri
(England) Zain-ul-Hassan	Rawalakot Hawks	(Pakistan) Rohail Nazir
