= 2021 Kashmir Premier League (Pakistan) squads =

Cricket competition

Cities represented by KPL teams

This is a list of the squads of the six franchise teams which competed in the 2021 Kashmir Premier League, a 20-over cricket league. The draft was planned to take place on 3 April 2021 but was later moved to 3 July due to the tournament being rescheduled from June to August. The draft took place in Islamabad. Each franchise was required to select a total of 5 emerging players. The tournament was held entirely in Muzaffarabad.

== Key ==
- Players with international caps are listed in **bold**.
- Ages are correct as of 3 July 2021

== Bagh Stallions ==
No.	Name	Nationality	Birth date	Category	Batting style	Bowling style	Year signed	Notes
Batsmen
1	Zeeshan Malik	Pakistan	26 December 1996 (aged 24)	Silver	Right-handed	Right-arm off break	2021	
05	Raja Farhan Khan	Pakistan	8 July 1993 (aged 27)	Emerging	Right-handed		2021	Post-draft signing
81	**Asad Shafiq**	Pakistan	28 January 1986 (aged 35)	Platinum	Right-handed	Right-arm off break	2021	Post-draft signing
94	**Shan Masood**	Pakistan	14 October 1989 (aged 31)	Platinum	Left-handed	Right-arm fast-medium	2021	Captain
N/A	Usman Mughal	Pakistan	12 August 1996 (aged 24)	Silver			2021	
All-rounders
11	Furqan Shafique	England	29 November 1996 (aged 24)	Emerging	Right-handed	Right-arm off break	2021	
18	Mohammad Junaid	Pakistan	21 March 2002 (aged 19)	Emerging	Left-handed	Left-arm slow left-arm orthodox	2021	
34	**Aamer Yamin**	Pakistan	26 June 1990 (aged 31)	Gold	Right-handed	Right-arm medium	2021	Replacement Pick.
95	**Iftikhar Ahmed**	Pakistan	3 September 1990 (aged 30)	Diamond	Right-handed	Right-arm off break	2021	
N/A	**Shadab Khan**	Pakistan	4 October 1998 (aged 22)	Icon	Right-handed	Right-arm leg break	2021	
Wicket-keepers
6	Rohail Nazir	Pakistan	10 October 2001 (aged 19)	Gold	Right-handed		2021	
N/A	**Phil Mustard**	England	9 October 1982 (aged 38)	Overseas	Left-handed	Left-arm medium-fast	2021	Overseas; Pulled out of the tournament.
Bowlers
00	Mohammad Ilyas	Pakistan	21 March 1999 (aged 22)	Gold	Right-handed	Right-arm medium-fast	2021	
3	Aamir Sohail	Pakistan		Emerging		Left-arm slow left-arm orthodox	2021	
13	**Umaid Asif**	Pakistan	30 March 1984 (aged 37)	Diamond	Right-handed	Right-arm medium-fast	2021	
14	Mohammad Imran	Pakistan	20 January 2001 (aged 20)	Silver	Right-handed	Left-arm medium-fast	2021	
82	Sufiyan Muqeem	Pakistan		Emerging			2021	
88	Basit Ali	Pakistan		Emerging			2021	Post-draft signing
N/A	Zeeshan Zameer	Pakistan	10 August 2002 (aged 18)	Emerging	Right-handed	Right-arm fast-medium	2021	

== Kotli Lions ==
No.	Name	Nationality	Birth date	Category	Batting style	Bowling style	Year signed	Notes
Batsmen
12	**Abdullah Syed**	United States	30 September 1989 (aged 31)	Emerging	Right-handed	Right-arm off break	2021	
12	**Ahsan Ali**	Pakistan	10 December 1993 (aged 27)	Silver	Right-handed	Leg break	2021	Post-draft signing
45	**Asif Ali**	Pakistan	1 October 1991 (aged 29)	Diamond	Right-handed	Right-arm off break	2021	
N/A	**Fakhar Zaman**	Pakistan	13 April 1990 (aged 31)	Icon	Left-handed	Left-arm orthodox spin	2021	
N/A	Syed Hashim Ali	Pakistan		Emerging	Left-handed		2021	
All-rounders
44	Khalid Usman	Pakistan	1 March 1986 (aged 35)	Silver	Right-handed	Left-arm orthodox spin	2021	
48	Hasan Raza	Pakistan	1 June 1995 (aged 26)	Emerging	Left-handed	Right-arm medium-fast	2021	
97	Saif Badar	Pakistan	3 July 1998 (aged 23)	Silver	Right-handed	Leg break	2021	Post-draft signing
Wicket-keepers
23	**Kamran Akmal**	Pakistan	13 January 1982 (aged 39)	Platinum	Right-handed	Right-arm medium	2021	Captain
59	Junaid Ali	Pakistan	6 December 1995 (aged 25)	Silver	Right-handed		2021	
N/A	Abdul Rehman	Pakistan		Emerging			2021	
Bowlers
03	Mujtaba Ghayas	Pakistan	27 July 1987 (aged 33)	Emerging	Right-handed	Right-arm medium	2021	Post-draft signing
5	Nadeem Khalil	Pakistan	1 November 1997 (aged 23)	Emerging	Right-handed	Right-arm fast-medium	2021	Post-draft signing
17	**Imran Khan**	Pakistan	15 July 1987 (aged 33)	Gold	Right-handed	Right-arm fast-medium	2021	
88	Akif Javed	Pakistan	10 October 2000 (aged 20)	Gold	Right-handed	Left-arm medium-fast	2021	
97	Irfanullah Shah	Pakistan	5 May 1995 (aged 26)	Silver	Right-handed	Right-arm medium-fast	2021	
100	Khurram Shehzad	Pakistan	25 November 1999 (aged 21)	Silver	Right-handed	Right-arm medium	2021	Post-draft signing
N/A	**Monty Panesar**	England	25 April 1982 (aged 39)	Overseas	Left-handed	Left-arm orthodox spin	2021	Overseas; Pulled out of the tournament
N/A	**Usman Qadir**	Pakistan	10 August 1993 (aged 27)	Diamond	Left-handed	Right-arm leg break	2021	
N/A	Yasir Jan	Pakistan		Emerging			2021	

== Mirpur Royals ==
No.	Name	Nationality	Birth date	Category	Batting style	Bowling style	Year signed	Notes
Batsmen
9	Ibtesam-ul-Haq	Pakistan	1 February 2000 (aged 21)	Emerging	Left-handed		2021	
24	**Mukhtar Ahmed**	Pakistan	20 December 1992 (aged 28)	Silver	Right-handed	leg break	2021	
98	**Sharjeel Khan**	Pakistan	14 August 1989 (aged 31)	Platinum	Left-handed	Right-arm leg spin	2021	
N/A	Ammad Alam	Pakistan	3 October 1998 (aged 22)	Emerging	Right-handed		2021	
N/A	**Owais Shah**	England	22 October 1978 (aged 42)	Overseas	Right-handed	Right-arm off spin	2021	Overseas; Pulled out of the tournament
All-rounders
11	Mohammad Taha	Pakistan	5 October 2000 (aged 20)	Emerging	Left-handed	Left-arm orthodox spin	2021	
18	**Shoaib Malik**	Pakistan	1 February 1982 (aged 39)	Icon	Right-handed	Right-arm off spin	2021	Captain
37	Amad Butt	Pakistan	10 June 1995 (aged 26)	Gold	Right-handed	Right-arm fast	2021	
65	Kashif Bhatti	Pakistan	25 July 1986 (aged 34)	Silver	Right-handed	Left-arm orthodox spin	2021	Replacement pick
72	**Khushdil Shah**	Pakistan	7 February 1995 (aged 26)	Diamond	Left-handed	Right-arm fast-medium	2021	
77	Adil Amin	Pakistan	13 December 1990 (aged 30)	Silver	Right-handed	Right-arm off break	2021	Post-draft signing
Wicket-keepers
61	Muhammad Akhlaq	Pakistan	12 November 1992 (aged 28)	Silver	Right-handed	Right-arm medium-fast	2021	
Bowlers
1	Sameen Gul	Pakistan	4 February 1999 (aged 22)	Gold	Right-handed	Right-arm medium	2021	Replacement pick
7	Abrar Ahmed	Pakistan	16 October 1998 (aged 22)	Silver	Left-handed	Left-arm leg break	2021	
26	Danyal Allah Ditta	Pakistan	2 July 1995 (aged 26)	Emerging	Left-handed	Left-arm slow left-arm orthodox	2021	
27	**Mohammad Irfan**	Pakistan	6 June 1982 (aged 39)	Diamond	Right-handed	Right-arm fast	2021	
38	Shadab Majeed	Pakistan	7 June 1997 (aged 24)	Emerging	Right-handed	Right-arm medium fast	2021	
48	Hassan Khan	Pakistan	16 October 1998 (aged 22)	Silver	Right-handed	Left-arm orthodox	2021	Post-draft signing
99	Salman Irshad	Pakistan	3 December 1995 (aged 25)	Gold	Right-handed	Right-arm fast	2021	

== Muzaffarabad Tigers ==
No.	Name	Nationality	Birth date	Category	Batting style	Bowling style	Year signed	Notes
Batsmen
1	Malik Nisar	Pakistan		Emerging	Right-handed	Right-arm medium	2021	Post-draft signing
12	**Sohaib Maqsood**	Pakistan	15 April 1987 (aged 34)	Diamond	Right-handed	Right-arm off break	2021	
75	Taimoor Sultan	Pakistan	4 October 1994 (aged 26)	Emerging	Right-handed		2021	
N/A	**Tillakaratne Dilshan**	Sri Lanka	14 October 1976 (aged 44)	Overseas	Right-handed	Right-arm off break	2021	Overseas
All-rounders
8	**Mohammad Hafeez**	Pakistan	17 October 1980 (aged 40)	Icon	Right-handed	Right-arm off break	2021	Captain
17	Sohail Akhtar	Pakistan	2 March 1986 (aged 35)	Silver	Right-handed	Right-arm medium	2021	
33	**Sohail Tanvir**	Pakistan	12 December 1984 (aged 36)	Platinum	Left-handed	Left-arm medium-fast	2021	
48	**Anwar Ali**	Pakistan	25 November 1987 (aged 33)	Silver	Right-handed	Right-arm fast-medium	2021	
74	**Mohammad Wasim**	Pakistan	25 August 2001 (aged 19)	Diamond	Right-handed	Right-arm medium	2021	
88	Inzamam-ul-Haq	Pakistan	22 July 1997 (aged 23)	Emerging	Right-handed	Slow left arm orthodox	2021	
Wicket-keepers
60	Zeeshan Ashraf	Pakistan	11 May 1992 (aged 29)	Gold	Left-handed	Right-arm off break	2021	
Bowlers
9	Arsalan Arif	Pakistan	5 January 1993 (aged 28)	Emerging	Left-handed	Slow left-arm orthodox	2021	
10	Usama Mir	Pakistan	23 December 1995 (aged 25)	Silver	Right-handed	Right-arm leg break	2021	
32	**Arshad Iqbal**	Pakistan	26 December 2000 (aged 20)	Gold	Right-handed	Right-arm medium-fast	2021	
78	Usman Arshad	England	9 January 1993 (aged 28)	Emerging	Right-handed	Right-arm medium-fast	2021	
115	Usman Yousuf	Pakistan		Emerging	Right-handed	Leg break	2021	Post-draft signing
N/A	Tahir Hussain	Pakistan	20 December 2000 (aged 20)	Emerging	Left-handed	Right-arm fast-medium	2021	

== Overseas Warriors ==
No.	Name	Nationality	Birth date	Category	Batting style	Bowling style	Year signed	Notes
Batsmen
4	**Herschelle Gibbs**	South Africa	23 February 1974 (aged 47)	Overseas	Right-handed	Right-arm medium	2021	Overseas
12	**Haider Ali**	Pakistan	2 October 2000 (aged 20)	Platinum	Right-handed		2021	
18	Naveed Malik	Pakistan	18 March 1995 (aged 26)	Emerging	Right-handed	Right-arm medium-fast	2021	
42	**Khurram Manzoor**	Pakistan	10 June 1986 (aged 35)		Right-handed	Right-arm off spin	2021	Post-draft signing
81	Nasir Nawaz	Pakistan	5 October 1998 (aged 22)	Silver	Right-handed		2021	
99	Uthman Ali Khan	England		Emerging	Left-handed		2021	
All-rounders
9	**Imad Wasim**	Pakistan	18 December 1988 (aged 32)	Icon	Left-handed	Slow left-arm orthodox	2021	Captain
23	Agha Salman	Pakistan	23 November 1993 (aged 27)	Gold	Right-handed	Right-arm off break	2021	Post-draft signing.
98	Kamran Ghulam	Pakistan	10 October 1995 (aged 25)	Gold	Right-handed	Slow left-arm orthodox	2021	Replacement pick.
N/A	**Hammad Azam**	Pakistan	16 March 1991 (aged 30)	Silver	Right-handed	Right-arm fast-medium	2021	
N/A	**Haris Sohail**	Pakistan	9 January 1989 (aged 32)	Gold	Left-handed	Slow left-arm orthodox	2021	
N/A	Qasim Akram	Pakistan	1 December 2002 (aged 18)	Silver	Right-handed	Right-arm off break	2021	
N/A	Rashid Naseer	Pakistan	4 March 1986 (aged 35)	Emerging	Left-handed	Left-arm unorthodox spin	2021	
Wicket-keepers
63	Mohammad Haris	Pakistan	30 March 2001 (aged 20)	Silver	Right-handed	Right-arm off break	2021	Post-draft signing.
77	**Azam Khan**	Pakistan	10 August 1998 (aged 22)	Diamond	Right-handed		2021	
N/A	Raza-ul-Mustafa	Pakistan	27 December 2003 (aged 17)	Emerging	Right-handed		2021	
Bowlers
14	**Sohail Khan**	Pakistan	6 March 1984 (aged 37)	Diamond	Right-handed	Right-arm fast	2021	
55	Abbas Afridi	Pakistan	5 April 2001 (aged 20)	Silver	Right-handed	Right-arm medium-fast	2021	
66	Faizan Saleem	Pakistan		Emerging	Right-handed	Right-arm medium	2021	Post-draft signing
70	**Muhammad Musa**	Pakistan	28 August 2000 (aged 20)	Gold	Right-handed	Right-arm medium-fast	2021	
N/A	Waleed Ahmed	Pakistan	4 December 1992 (aged 28)	Emerging	Right-handed	Right-arm off break	2021	

== Rawalakot Hawks ==
No.	Name	Nationality	Birth date	Category	Batting style	Bowling style	Year signed	Notes
Batsmen
7	**Ahmed Shehzad**	Pakistan	23 November 1991 (aged 29)	Diamond	Right-handed	Right-arm leg break	2021	
9	Samiullah Afridi	Pakistan	11 November 1996 (aged 24)	Emerging	Right-handed	leg break	2021	
27	Kashif Ali	England	7 February 1998 (aged 23)	Emerging	Right-handed	leg break	2021	
51	**Sahibzada Farhan**	Pakistan	6 March 1996 (aged 25)	Gold	Right-handed		2021	
All-rounders
5	**Hussain Talat**	Pakistan	12 February 1996 (aged 25)	Diamond	Right-handed	Right-arm fast-medium	2021	
10	**Shahid Afridi**	Pakistan	1 March 1977 (aged 44)	Icon	Right-handed	Right-arm leg spin	2021	Captain
16	**Umar Amin**	Pakistan	16 October 1989 (aged 31)	Gold	Left-handed	Right-arm medium	2021	Replacement pick.
22	**Danish Aziz**	Pakistan	20 November 1995 (aged 25)	Gold	Left-handed	Slow left-arm orthodox	2021	
29	Mohammad Imran	Pakistan	25 December 1996 (aged 24)	Silver	Right-handed	Right-arm medium fast	2021	
31	Asif Afridi	Pakistan	25 December 1986 (aged 34)	Silver	Left-handed	Left-arm Slow left-arm orthodox	2021	Post-draft signing
N/A	Shahid Ilyas	Pakistan	25 September 1992 (aged 28)	Emerging	Right-handed	Right-arm fast-medium	2021	
Wicket-keepers
19	Raja Shahzad	Pakistan		Emerging	Right-handed	Right-arm medium	2021	Post-draft signing
25	Bismillah Khan	Pakistan	1 March 1990 (aged 31)	Silver	Right-handed		2021	
N/A	**Matt Prior**	England	26 December 1982 (aged 38)	Overseas	Right-handed		2021	Overseas; Pulled out of the tournament.
Bowlers
8	Faisal Altaf	United Arab Emirates	15 March 2001 (aged 20)	Emerging	Right-handed	Right-arm fast-medium	2021	
21	Zaman Khan	Pakistan	10 September 2001 (aged 19)	Emerging	Right-handed	Right-arm fast-medium	2021	
23	Mohammad Irfan	Pakistan	15 May 1995 (aged 26)	Silver	Right-handed	Right-arm fast	2021	
36	**Usman Shinwari**	Pakistan	5 January 1994 (aged 27)	Platinum	Right-handed	Left-arm fast-medium	2021	Post-draft signing.
58	Najeebullah Afridi	Pakistan	3 March 1990 (aged 31)	Emerging	Right-handed	Right-arm medium	2021	Post-draft signing
58	**Waqas Maqsood**	Pakistan	4 November 1987 (aged 33)	Gold	Left-handed	Left-arm fast-medium	2021	
N/A	**Mohammad Hasnain**	Pakistan	5 April 2000 (aged 21)	Platinum	Right-handed	Right-arm fast	2021	
N/A	**Zafar Gohar**	Pakistan	1 February 1995 (aged 26)	Silver	Left-handed	Slow left-arm orthodox	2021	
