= 2020–21 Pakistan Cup =

Cricket tournament

- Dates: 8 – 31 January 2021
- Administrator: Pakistan Cricket Board
- Cricket format: List A
- Tournament format(s): Double round-robin and knockout
- Host: Karachi
- Champions: Khyber Pakhtunkhwa (3rd title)
- Participants: 6
- Matches: 33
- Player of the series: Hammad Azam
- Most runs: Tayyab Tahir (666)
- Most wickets: Asif Afridi (25)

The 2020–21 Pakistan Cup was a List A cricket competition that took place in Karachi, Pakistan from 8 to 31 January 2021. Khyber Pakhtunkhwa were the defending champions of the previous edition of the tournament having defeated Baluchistan. However, after the new domestic structure announced by Pakistan Cricket Board (PCB), six newly formed regional teams were formed.

In December 2020, it was announced that Aaron Summers would play in the tournament, becoming the first Australian cricketer to play in a domestic cricket competition in Pakistan, after signing with Southern Punjab cricket team.

Following the conclusion of the group stage, Sindh, Khyber Pakhtunkhwa, Northern and Central Punjab had all qualified for the semi-finals of the tournament. In the first semi-final, Central Punjab beat Sindh by 127 runs. The second semi-final, between Northern and Khyber Pakhtunkhwa, ended in a tie, with Khyber Pakhtunkhwa winning the Super Over. In the final, Khyber Pakhtunkhwa beat Central Punjab by seven wickets to win the tournament. It was Khyber Pakhtunkhwa's third domestic title of the season, after they won the 2020–21 National T20 Cup and shared the 2020–21 Quaid-e-Azam Trophy with Central Punjab.

== Squads ==
On 7 January 2021, the PCB confirmed all the squads for the tournament.

Balochistan	Central Punjab	Khyber Pakhtunkhwa	Northern	Sindh	Southern Punjab
Imran Farhat (c); Bismillah Khan (vc); Abdul Bangalzai; Adnan Akmal; Akbar-ur-Rehman; Ali Rafiq; Awais Zia; Ayaz Tasawwar; Gohar Faiz; Jalat Khan; Kashif Bhatti; Nazar Hussain; Raza-ul-Hasan; Taimur Ali; Taj Wali; Umaid Asif	Hasan Ali (c); Ahmed Bashir; Ahmed Safi Abdullah; Ali Shan (wk); Ali Zaryab; Bilal Asif; Bilawal Iqbal; Muhammad Akhlaq; Mohammad Saad; Qasim Akram; Rizwan Hussain; Saad Nasim; Sohaibullah; Tayyab Tahir; Usman Salahuddin; Waqas Maqsood	Khalid Usman (c); Fakhar Zaman (vc); Adil Amin; Arshad Iqbal; Asif Afridi; Imran Khan; Irfanullah Shah; Israrullah; Kamran Ghulam; Mohammad Mohsin; Mohammad Wasim; Musadiq Ahmed; Rehan Afridi (wk); Sahibzada Farhan; Sajid Khan; Usman Shinwari	Mohammad Nawaz (c); Aamer Jamal; Ali Imran; Asif Ali; Athar Mahmood; Faizan Riaz; Hammad Azam; Jamal Anwar; Mubasir Khan; Mohammad Ismail; Nasir Nawaz; Nauman Ali; Salman Irshad; Sohail Tanvir; Taimoor Sultan; Umar Amin	Saud Shakeel (c); Aaliyan Mehmood; Abrar Ahmed; Anwar Ali; Asad Shafiq; Azam Khan; Ghulam Mudassar; Hasan Mohsin; Khurram Manzoor; Mir Hamza; Mohammad Asghar; Mohammad Umar; Omair Yousuf; Saad Ali; Shahnawaz Dahani; Sharjeel Khan	Sohaib Maqsood (c); Agha Salman (vc); Aamer Yamin; Aaron Summers; Ali Shafiq; Mohammad Ilyas; Mohammad Imran; Mukhtar Ahmed; Rahat Ali; Saif Badar; Umer Khan; Umar Siddiq; Waqar Hussain; Zahid Mahmood; Zain Abbas; Zeeshan Ashraf

== Group stage ==
=== Points ===
Pos	Team	Pld	W	L	NR	Pts	NRR
1	Sindh	10	7	3	0	14	0.823
2	Khyber Pakhtunkhwa	10	6	4	0	12	0.316
3	Northern	10	5	5	0	10	−0.059
4	Central Punjab	10	5	5	0	10	−0.320
5	Southern Punjab	10	4	6	0	8	0.008
6	Balochistan	10	3	7	0	6	−0.713

Source: ESPN Cricinfo

Advanced to the semi-finals

=== Fixtures ===
8 January 2021
Scorecard

Northern; 285/7 (50 overs)	v	Balochistan; 249 (46.3 overs)
Umar Amin 115* (136); Raza-ul-Hasan 2/39 (10 overs)		Imran Farhat 49 (46); Aamer Jamal 2/24 (4.3 overs)

Northern won by 36 runs
United Bank Limited Sports Complex, Karachi
Umpires: Ghaffar Kazmi and Imran Javed
Player of the match: Umar Amin (Northern)

- Balochistan won the toss and elected to field.
- Abdul Bangalzai (Balochistan), Mubasir Khan and Salman Irshad (Northern) all made their List A debuts.

8 January 2021
Scorecard

Sindh; 309 (49.1 overs)	v	Southern Punjab; 311/6 (48.3 overs)
Azam Khan 69 (36); Mohammad Ilyas 3/36 (7.1 overs)		Agha Salman 106* (79); Mohammad Umar 2/60 (9 overs)

Southern Punjab won by 4 wickets
State Bank of Pakistan Sports Complex, Karachi
Umpires: Qaiser Waheed and Saqib Khan
Player of the match: Agha Salman (Southern Punjab)

- Southern Punjab won the toss and elected to field.
- Aaliyan Mehmood (Sindh) made his List A debut.
- Aaron Summers (Southern Punjab) became the first Australian to play domestic cricket in Pakistan.

8 January 2021
Scorecard

Central Punjab; 305/7 (50 overs)	v	Khyber Pakhtunkhwa; 311/5 (46.3 overs)
Muhammad Akhlaq 117 (115); Arshad Iqbal 2/63 (10 overs)		Musadiq Ahmed 103* (97); Waqas Maqsood 3/43 (8 overs)

Khyber Pakhtunkhwa won by 5 wickets
National Bank of Pakistan Sports Complex, Karachi
Umpires: Imtiaz Iqbal and Nasir Hussain
Player of the match: Musadiq Ahmed (Khyber Pakhtunkhwa)

- Khyber Pakhtunkhwa won the toss and elected to field.
- Qasim Akram (Central Punjab) made his List A debut.
- Musadiq Ahmed (Khyber Pakhtunkhwa) scored his first century in List A cricket.

10 January 2021
Scorecard

Southern Punjab; 244 (46.2 overs)	v	Balochistan; 247/9 (49.1 overs)
Aamer Yamin 73 (81); Abdul Bangalzai 2/22 (4 overs)		Imran Farhat 96 (107); Zahid Mahmood 4/46 (10 overs)

Balochistan won by 1 wicket
State Bank of Pakistan Sports Complex, Karachi
Umpires: Ghaffar Kazmi and Aftab Gillani
Player of the match: Imran Farhat (Balochistan)

- Balochistan won the toss and elected to field.

10 January 2021
Scorecard

Sindh; 256 (50 overs)	v	Khyber Pakhtunkhwa; 193 (42.2 overs)
Hasan Mohsin 66 (73); Asif Afridi 5/31 (10 overs)		Sajid Khan 52 (47); Mohammad Umar 3/21 (8 overs)

Sindh won by 63 runs
National Bank of Pakistan Sports Complex, Karachi
Umpires: Qaiser Waheed and Imran Javed
Player of the match: Anwar Ali (Sindh)

- Khyber Pakhtunkhwa won the toss and elected to field.

10 January 2021
Scorecard

Northern; 382/8 (50 overs)	v	Central Punjab; 228 (37.1 overs)
Taimoor Sultan 102 (94); Ahmed Bashir 4/86 (10 overs)		Muhammad Akhlaq 55 (51); Hammad Azam 4/42 (8 overs)

Northern won by 154 runs
United Bank Limited Sports Complex, Karachi
Umpires: Nasir Hussain and Waleed Yaqub
Player of the match: Taimoor Sultan (Northern)

- Central Punjab won the toss and elected to field.

12 January 2021
Scorecard

Balochistan; 377/6 (50 overs)	v	Khyber Pakhtunkhwa; 378/8 (49.4 overs)
Bismillah Khan 92 (90); Irfanullah Shah 2/65 (10 overs)		Sahibzada Farhan 155 (135); Taj Wali 4/74 (10 overs)

Khyber Pakhtunkhwa won by 2 wickets
National Bank of Pakistan Sports Complex, Karachi
Umpires: Ghaffar Kazmi and Qaiser Waheed
Player of the match: Sahibzada Farhan (Khyber Pakhtunkhwa)

- Balochistan won the toss and elected to bat.

12 January 2021
Scorecard

Central Punjab; 287 (48.2 overs)	v	Sindh; 289/4 (46.5 overs)
Ali Zaryab 68 (73); Mohammad Umar 4/59 (10 overs)		Khurram Manzoor 119 (120); Bilal Asif 1/41 (10 overs)

Sindh won by 6 wickets
State Bank of Pakistan Sports Complex, Karachi
Umpires: Waleed Yaqub and Aftab Gillani
Player of the match: Khurram Manzoor (Sindh)

- Central Punjab won the toss and elected to bat.

12 January 2021
Scorecard

Northern; 306/9 (50 overs)	v	Southern Punjab; 249 (45.2 overs)
Asif Ali 127 (70); Mohammad Ilyas 4/61 (10 overs)		Mukhtar Ahmed 139 (134); Mohammad Ismail 3/47 (8.2 overs)

Northern won by 57 runs
United Bank Limited Sports Complex, Karachi
Umpires: Imran Javed and Saqib Khan
Player of the match: Asif Ali (Northern)

- Southern Punjab won the toss and elected to field.

14 January 2021
Scorecard

Sindh; 239 (47 overs)	v	Balochistan; 240/7 (46.3 overs)
Hassan Khan 54 (55); Amad Butt 5/54 (9 overs)		Ayaz Tasawwar 69 (107); Mohammad Hasnain 3/36 (10 overs)

Balochistan won by 3 wickets
State Bank of Pakistan Sports Complex, Karachi
Umpires: Ghaffar Kazmi and Nasir Hussain
Player of the match: Amad Butt (Balochistan)

- Balochistan won the toss and elected to field.

14 January 2021
Scorecard

Southern Punjab; 320/9 (50 overs)	v	Central Punjab; 321/6 (49.1 overs)
Waqar Hussain 70 (64); Ahmed Bashir 3/51 (10 overs)		Tayyab Tahir 131* (140); Mohammad Imran 2/39 (10 overs)

Central Punjab won by 4 wickets
United Bank Limited Sports Complex, Karachi
Umpires: Aleem Dar and Faisal Afridi
Player of the match: Tayyab Tahir (Central Punjab)

- Central Punjab won the toss and elected to field.

14 January 2021
Scorecard

Northern; 112 (36.4 overs)	v	Khyber Pakhtunkhwa; 113/6 (23.1 overs)
Faizan Riaz 42 (83); Iftikhar Ahmed 3/12 (4.4 overs)		Sajid Khan 20* (14)

Khyber Pakhtunkhwa won by 4 wickets
National Bank of Pakistan Sports Complex, Karachi
Umpires: Qaiser Waheed and Saqib Khan
Player of the match: Sajid Khan (Khyber Pakhtunkhwa)

- Khyber Pakhtunkhwa won the toss and elected to field.

16 January 2021
Scorecard

Balochistan; 213 (48 overs)	v	Central Punjab; 214/6 (46 overs)
Kashif Bhatti 59 (83); Usman Qadir 4/41 (10 overs)		Qasim Akram 60* (72); Raza-ul-Hasan 4/36 (10 overs)

Central Punjab won by 4 wickets
State Bank of Pakistan Sports Complex, Karachi
Umpires: Zameer Haider and Nasir Hussain
Player of the match: Qasim Akram (Central Punjab)

- Central Punjab won the toss and elected to field.

16 January 2021
Scorecard

Northern; 186 (44.2 overs)	v	Sindh; 187/3 (28.1 overs)
Asif Ali 66 (60); Danish Aziz 5/23 (5.2 overs)		Sharjeel Khan 108 (74); Hammad Azam 2/21 (6 overs)

Sindh won by 7 wickets
National Bank of Pakistan Sports Complex, Karachi
Umpires: Aleem Dar and Saqib Khan
Player of the match: Sharjeel Khan (Sindh)

- Sindh won the toss and elected to field.

16 January 2021
Scorecard

Khyber Pakhtunkhwa; 316/9 (50 overs)	v	Southern Punjab; 319/2 (40.3 overs)
Khalid Usman 91* (74); Ali Shafiq 3/46 (10 overs)		Mukhtar Ahmed 108* (109); Imran Khan 1/56 (7 overs)

Southern Punjab won by 8 wickets
United Bank Limited Sports Complex, Karachi
Umpires: Qaiser Waheed and Faisal Afridi
Player of the match: Mukhtar Ahmed (Southern Punjab)

- Southern Punjab won the toss and elected to field.

18 January 2021
Scorecard

Balochistan; 116 (25.3 overs)	v	Sindh; 118/3 (19.5 overs)
Imran Farhat 32 (62); Hassan Khan 4/15 (3.3 overs)		Khurram Manzoor 56* (51); Taj Wali 3/35 (6 overs)

Sindh won by 7 wickets
United Bank Limited Sports Complex, Karachi
Umpires: Zameer Haider and Nasir Hussain
Player of the match: Hassan Khan (Sindh)

- Sindh won the toss and elected to field.

18 January 2021
Scorecard

Southern Punjab; 232 (45.2 overs)	v	Central Punjab; 235/5 (45 overs)
Mukhtar Ahmed 94 (98); Raza Ali Dar 3/37 (9 overs)		Usman Salahuddin 67* (89); Zahid Mahmood 2/52 (10 overs)

Central Punjab won by 5 wickets
National Bank of Pakistan Sports Complex, Karachi
Umpires: Saqib Khan and Aftab Gillani
Player of the match: Mukhtar Ahmed (Southern Punjab)

- Central Punjab won the toss and elected to field.

18 January 2021
Scorecard

Northern; 324 (49.2 overs)	v	Khyber Pakhtunkhwa; 327/5 (48.2 overs)
Haider Ali 95 (87); Irfanullah Shah 4/68 (9.2 overs)		Iftikhar Ahmed 123 (110); Athar Mahmood 3/76 (10 overs)

Khyber Pakhtunkhwa won by 5 wickets
State Bank of Pakistan Sports Complex, Karachi
Umpires: Aleem Dar and Qaiser Waheed
Player of the match: Iftikhar Ahmed (Khyber Pakhtunkhwa)

- Khyber Pakhtunkhwa won the toss and elected to field.
- Aamer Azmat, Mohammad Imran, Mohammad Wasim (Khyber Pakhtunkhwa) and Farhan Shafiq (Northern) all made their List A debuts.

20 January 2021
Scorecard

Balochistan; 157 (38.2 overs)	v	Southern Punjab; 158/2 (34.4 overs)
Bismillah Khan 38 (32); Umer Khan 5/42 (9.2 overs)		Shan Masood 66* (95); Haris Sohail 1/33 (6.4 overs)

Southern Punjab won by 8 wickets
National Bank of Pakistan Sports Complex, Karachi
Umpires: Qaiser Waheed and Waleed Yaqub
Player of the match: Umer Khan (Southern Punjab)

- Southern Punjab won the toss and elected to field.

20 January 2021
Scorecard

Khyber Pakhtunkhwa; 275 (49.2 overs)	v	Sindh; 277/6 (48.4 overs)
Mohammad Wasim 54 (50); Anwar Ali 2/57 (9 overs)		Danish Aziz 101* (102); Asif Afridi 3/60 (10 overs)

Sindh won by 4 wickets
State Bank of Pakistan Sports Complex, Karachi
Umpires: Ghaffar Kazmi and Faisal Afridi
Player of the match: Danish Aziz (Sindh)

- Sindh won the toss and elected to field.

20 January 2021
Scorecard

Central Punjab; 330/5 (50 overs)	v	Northern; 286 (47.1 overs)
Saad Nasim 82* (60); Faizan Riaz 2/37 (5 overs)		Asif Ali 88 (62); Usman Qadir 6/79 (10 overs)

Central Punjab won by 44 runs
United Bank Limited Sports Complex, Karachi
Umpires: Imran Javed and Nasir Hussain
Player of the match: Usman Qadir (Central Punjab)

- Northern won the toss and elected to field.

22 January 2021
Scorecard

Central Punjab; 296/7 (50 overs)	v	Balochistan; 302/4 (49.4 overs)
Qasim Akram 108* (81); Jalat Khan 2/40 (10 overs)		Haris Sohail 109* (99); Raza Ali Dar 1/33 (6 overs)

Balochistan won by 8 wickets
National Bank of Pakistan Sports Complex, Karachi
Umpires: Zameer Haider and Waleed Yaqub
Player of the match: Haris Sohail (Balochistan)

- Balochistan won the toss and elected to field.
- Qasim Akram (Central Punjab) scored his first century in List A cricket.

22 January 2021
Scorecard

Sindh; 277/6 (50 overs)	v	Northern; 264 (50 overs)
Khurram Manzoor 122 (138); Muhammad Musa 2/43 (7 overs)		Hammad Azam 70 (65); Danish Aziz 4/32 (9 overs)

Sindh won by 13 runs
State Bank of Pakistan Sports Complex, Karachi
Umpires: Faisal Afridi and Nasir Hussain
Player of the match: Khurram Manzoor (Sindh)

- Northern won the toss and elected to field.

22 January 2021
Scorecard

Khyber Pakhtunkhwa; 244 (45.5 overs)	v	Southern Punjab; 246/5 (48.2 overs)
Khalid Usman 56 (50); Zahid Mahmood 2/28 (10 overs)		Shan Masood 91 (112); Khalid Usman 1/29 (6 overs)

Southern Punjab won by 5 wickets
United Bank Limited Sports Complex, Karachi
Umpires: Ghaffar Kazmi and Imran Javed
Player of the match: Shan Masood (Southern Punjab)

- Southern Punjab won the toss and elected to field.
- Mohammad Amir Khan (Khyber Pakhtunkhwa) made his List A debut.

24 January 2021
Scorecard

Balochistan; 249/6 (50 overs)	v	Northern; 252/4 (46.4 overs)
Ayaz Tasawwar 82* (68); Athar Mahmood 2/54 (10 overs)		Rohail Nazir 69* (84); Mohammad Junaid 2/49 (7 overs)

Northern won by 6 wickets
National Bank of Pakistan Sports Complex, Karachi
Umpires: Zameer Haider and Imtiaz Iqbal
Player of the match: Rohail Nazir (Northern)

- Northern won the toss and elected to field.
- Mohammad Junaid (Balochistan) made his List A debut.

24 January 2021
Scorecard

Southern Punjab; 348/4 (50 overs)	v	Sindh; 349/5 (46.5 overs)
Sohaib Maqsood 130 (79); Mohammad Hasnain 2/38 (10 overs)		Saad Ali 78* (54); Mohammad Abbas 2/62 (9 overs)

Sindh won by 5 wickets
United Bank Limited Sports Complex, Karachi
Umpires: Faisal Afridi and Qaiser Waheed
Player of the match: Saad Ali (Sindh)

- Sindh won the toss and elected to field.

24 January 2021
Scorecard

Khyber Pakhtunkhwa; 328/9 (50 overs)	v	Central Punjab; 259 (44.3 overs)
Fakhar Zaman 92 (95); Zafar Gohar 3/49 (10 overs)		Qasim Akram 67 (76); Iftikhar Ahmed 4/47 (10 overs)

Khyber Pakhtunkhwa won by 69 runs
State Bank of Pakistan Sports Complex, Karachi
Umpires: Ghaffar Kazmi and Waleed Yaqub
Player of the match: Iftikhar Ahmed (Khyber Pakhtunkhwa)

- Central Punjab won the toss and elected to field.

26 January 2021
Scorecard

Khyber Pakhtunkhwa; 370/9 (50 overs)	v	Balochistan; 347 (47 overs)
Adil Amin 121 (90); Gohar Faiz 4/66 (10 overs)		Imran Farhat 123 (88); Imran Khan 4/58 (9 overs)

Khyber Pakhtunkhwa won by 23 runs
State Bank of Pakistan Sports Complex, Karachi
Umpires: Imran Javed and Nasir Hussain
Player of the match: Adil Amin (Balochistan)

- Balochistan won the toss and elected to field.

26 January 2021
Scorecard

Sindh; 277/6 (50 overs)	v	Central Punjab; 283/6 (49.3 overs)
Khurram Manzoor 143* (163); Zafar Gohar 2/37 (10 overs)		Tayyab Tahir 93 (102); Hassan Khan 2/53 (9 overs)

Central Punjab won by 4 wickets
National Bank of Pakistan Sports Complex, Karachi
Umpires: Imtiaz Iqbal and Waleed Yaqub
Player of the match: Khurram Manzoor (Sindh)

- Central Punjab won the toss and elected to field.

26 January 2021
Scorecard

Northern; 337/8 (50 overs)	v	Southern Punjab; 293 (46.3 overs)
Rohail Nazir 88 (71); Zahid Mahmood 3/49 (10 overs)		Shan Masood 141 (128); Salman Irshad 2/47 (8.3 overs)

Northern won by 44 runs
United Bank Limited Sports Complex, Karachi
Umpires: Zameer Haider and Qaiser Waheed
Player of the match: Rohail Nazir (Northern)

- Northern won the toss and elected to bat.

== Finals ==
1st Semi-Final
29 January 2021
Scorecard

Central Punjab; 339/9 (50 overs)	v	Sindh; 212 (36.5 overs)
Tayyab Tahir 60 (70); Hassan Khan 2/42 (6 overs)		Khurram Manzoor 88 (73); Mohammad Ali 3/31 (6.5 overs)

Central Punjab won by 127 runs
State Bank of Pakistan Sports Complex, Karachi
Umpires: Faisal Afridi and Waleed Yaqub
Player of the match: Zafar Gohar (Central Punjab)

- Sindh won the toss and elected to field.

2nd Semi-Final
30 January 2021
Scorecard

Northern; 303/8 (50 overs)	v	Khyber Pakhtunkhwa; 303/7 (50 overs)
Hammad Azam 94 (63); Mohammad Wasim 2/37 (7 overs)		Sahibzada Farhan 132 (144); Athar Mahmood 2/58 (10 overs)

Match tied
(Khyber Pakhtunkhwa won the Super Over)
State Bank of Pakistan Sports Complex, Karachi
Umpires: Zameer Haider and Imran Javed
Player of the match: Sahibzada Farhan (Khyber Pakhtunkhwa)

- Northern won the toss and elected to bat.

Final
31 January 2021
Scorecard

Central Punjab; 239 (47 overs)	v	Khyber Pakhtunkhwa; 245/3 (36.1 overs)
Tayyab Tahir 67 (88); Asif Afridi 5/39 (10 overs)		Sahibzada Farhan 103* (102); Qasim Akram 1/30 (4 overs)

Khyber Pakhtunkhwa won by 7 wickets
State Bank of Pakistan Sports Complex, Karachi
Umpires: Faisal Afridi and Imtiaz Iqbal
Player of the match: Asif Afridi (Khyber Pakhtunkhwa)

- Khyber Pakhtunkhwa won the toss and elected to field.
