= Overseas Warriors in 2022 =

2nd season of Overseas Warriors in the Kashmir Premier League

Overseas Warriors
2022 season
- Coach: Azam Khan
- Captain: Asad Shafiq
- KPL 2022: 3rd
- Most runs: Asad Shafiq (221)
- Most wickets: Sohail Khan (9)

Overseas Warriors is a franchise cricket team that represents Kotli in the Kashmir Premier League. Asad Shafiq was the captain and Azam Khan was the coach of the team. Asad Shafiq was announced as Overseas Warriors’ icon player.

== Squad ==
- Players with international caps are listed in **bold**.
- Ages are correct as of 21 July 2022

No.	Name	Nationality	Birth date	Category	Batting style	Bowling style	Year signed	Notes
Batsmen
1	Malik Nisar	Pakistan		Kashmiri	Right-handed	Right-arm medium	2022	
81	**Asad Shafiq**	Pakistan	28 January 1986 (aged 36)	Icon	Right-handed	Right-arm off break	2022	Captain
	Hanan Ahmed	Pakistan		Kashmiri			2022	
	Khawaja Nafay	Pakistan	13 February 2002 (aged 20)	Emerging	Right-handed	Right-arm off break	2022	
	Hashim Ali	Pakistan		Kashmiri	Left-handed		2022	
All-rounders
15	Saif Badar	Pakistan	3 July 1998 (aged 24)	Gold	Right-handed	Leg break	2022	
27	Muhammad Shehzad	Pakistan	5 February 2004 (aged 18)	Silver	Right-handed	Right-arm medium-fast	2022	
29	Mohammad Imran	Pakistan	25 December 1996 (aged 25)	Diamond	Right-handed	Right-arm medium fast	2022	
31	**Bilal Asif**	Pakistan	24 September 1985 (aged 36)	Silver	Right-handed	Off spin	2022	
77	Adil Amin	Pakistan	13 December 1990 (aged 31)	Silver	Right-handed	Off spin	2022	
98	Kamran Ghulam	Pakistan	10 October 1995 (aged 26)	Platinum	Right-handed	Slow left-arm orthodox	2021	
	Nosherwan Ibrahim	Pakistan					2022	Post-draft signing
	Umer Zeeshan	United Arab Emirates		Emerging	Right-handed	Right-arm medium	2022	
Wicket-keepers
23	**Azam Khan**	Pakistan	10 August 1998 (aged 23)	Platinum	Right-handed		2021	
Bowlers
13	**Umaid Asif**	Pakistan	30 March 1984 (aged 38)	Gold	Right-handed	Right-arm medium-fast	2022	
14	**Sohail Khan**	Pakistan	6 March 1984 (aged 38)	Diamond	Right-handed	Right-arm fast	2021	
	Ali Shafiq	Pakistan	16 November 1996 (aged 25)	Silver	Right-handed	Right-arm medium-fast	2022	
	Farhan Shafiq	Pakistan	5 December 1999 (aged 22)	Kashmiri	Left-handed	Slow left-arm orthodox	2022	
	Saad Asif	Pakistan		Kashmiri			2022	
	Sameer Khan	Pakistan	21 October 2006 (aged 15)	Supplementary	Left-handed	Slow left-arm orthodox	2022	
	Shayan Raza	Pakistan	19 September 2006 (aged 15)	Supplementary	Left-handed	Slow left-arm orthodox	2022	

== Season standings ==
=== Points table ===
Pos	Team	Pld	W	L	NR	Pts	NRR
1	Mirpur Royals (C)	6	4	2	0	8	0.409
2	Bagh Stallions (R)	6	3	2	1	7	0.449
3	Overseas Warriors (3rd)	6	3	2	1	7	0.207
4	Kotli Lions (4th)	6	2	3	1	5	0.457
5	Jammu Janbaz	6	2	3	1	5	−0.322
6	Rawalakot Hawks	6	2	3	1	5	−0.613
7	Muzaffarabad Tigers	6	2	3	1	5	−0.699

Source: Cricinfo
- Top 4 teams qualified for the playoffs
- Advanced to Qualifier
- Advanced to Eliminator 1

Notes:

- C = Champions;
- R = Runner-up;
- (x) = Position at the end of the tournament;

== League fixtures and results ==
Match 4
15 August 2022
14:00
Scorecard

Overseas Warriors; 101/3 (8 overs)	v	Jammu Janbaz; 105/5 (7.5 overs)
Mohammad Imran 29 (12); Usama Mir 2/16 (2 overs)		Shahzab 40 (18); Sohail Khan 3/14 (2 overs)

Jammu Janbaz won by 5 wickets
Muzaffarabad Cricket Stadium, Muzaffarabad
Umpires: Aaley Haider (Pak) and Ahsan Raza (Pak)
Player of the match: Shahzab (Jammu Janbaz)

- Jammu Janbaz won the toss and elected to field.
- Match reduced to 8 overs per side due to rain.
- Sohail Khan took his first hat-trick in the KPL.

Match 7
16 August 2022
19:00 (N)
Scorecard

Kotli Lions	v	Overseas Warriors

Match Abandoned
Muzaffarabad Cricket Stadium, Muzaffarabad
Umpires: Aaley Haider (Pak) and Asif Yaqoob (Pak)

Match 10
18 August 2022
14:00
Scorecard

Overseas Warriors; 188/7 (20 overs)	v	Mirpur Royals; 173/8 (20 overs)
Asad Shafiq 112 (60); Abrar Ahmed 2/9 (4 overs)		Hassan Nawaz 56 (32); Sohail Khan 2/36 (4 overs)

Overseas Warriors won by 15 runs
Muzaffarabad Cricket Stadium, Muzaffarabad
Umpires: Aftab Gillani (Pak) and Shozab Raza (Pak)
Player of the match: Asad Shafiq (Overseas Warriors)

- Mirpur Royals won the toss and elected to bowl.
- Asad Shafiq scored his first century in the KPL.

Match 13
19 August 2022
19:00 (N)
Scorecard

Overseas Warriors; 147/9 (20 overs)	v	Muzaffarabad Tigers; 138/9 (20 overs)
Saif Badar 57* (40); Arshad Iqbal 3/17 (4 overs)		Ameer Hamza 31 (24); Muhammad Shehzad 2/2 (1 over)

Overseas Warriors won by 9 runs
Muzaffarabad Cricket Stadium, Muzaffarabad
Umpires: Mohammad Asif (Pak) and Nasir Hussain (Pak)
Player of the match: Saif Badar (Overseas Warriors)

- Muzaffarabad Tigers won the toss and elected to bowl.

Match 17
21 August 2022
21:00 (N)
Scorecard

Rawalakot Hawks; 179/8 (20 overs)	v	Overseas Warriors; 184/4 (19.1 overs)
Ahmed Shehzad 66 (45); Farhan Shafiq 2/16 (4 overs)		Asad Shafiq 66 (43); Mohammad Amir 2/27 (4 overs)

Overseas Warriors won by 6 wickets
Muzaffarabad Cricket Stadium, Muzaffarabad
Umpires: Aftab Gillani (Pak) and Rashid Riaz (Pak)
Player of the match: Asad Shafiq (Overseas Warriors)

- Overseas Warriors won the toss and elected to bowl.

Match 20
23 August 2022
14:00
Scorecard

Overseas Warriors; 127 (19.5 overs)	v	Bagh Stallions; 70/3 (9 overs)
Kamran Ghulam 32 (24); Ali Majid 3/13 (4 overs)		Abdul Bangalzai 30 (20); Sohail Khan 2/14 (2 overs)

Bagh Stallions won by 15 runs (DLS method)
Muzaffarabad Cricket Stadium, Muzaffarabad
Umpires: Ahmed Shahab (Pak) and Imtiaz Iqbal (Pak)
Player of the match: Ali Majid (Bagh Stallions)

- Bagh Stallions won the toss and elected to bowl.
- Match abandoned due to wet outfield.

== Playoffs ==
=== Eliminator 1 ===
Match 23
24 August 2022
19:00 (N)
Scorecard

Overseas Warriors	v	Kotli Lions

Match Abandoned
Muzaffarabad Cricket Stadium, Muzaffarabad

- Overseas Warriors qualified for Eliminator 2 due to their better position in the points table.

=== Eliminator 2 ===
Match 24
25 August 2022
19:00 (N)
Scorecard

Bagh Stallions	v	Overseas Warriors

Match Abandoned
Muzaffarabad Cricket Stadium, Muzaffarabad

- Bagh Stallions qualified for the Final due to their better position in the points table.

== Statistics ==
=== Most runs ===
Nat.	Player	Matches	Innings	Runs	Average	HS	100	50
(Pakistan)	Asad Shafiq	5	4	221	55.25	112	1	1
(Pakistan)	Kamran Ghulam	5	5	127	25.40	39	0	0
(Pakistan)	Azam Khan	5	5	100	33.33	29*	0	0
(Pakistan)	Saif Badar	5	5	67	22.33	57*	0	1
(Pakistan)	Muhammad Shehzad	5	5	62	15.50	27	0	0

Source: Cricinfo

=== Most wickets ===
Nat.	Player	Matches	Overs	Wickets	Average	BBI	4w	5w
(Pakistan)	Sohail Khan	5	16.0	9	15.67	3/14	0	0
(Pakistan)	Farhan Shafiq	4	10.5	5	13.00	2/16	0	0
(Pakistan)	Imran Randhawa	5	17.0	5	26.60	2/25	0	0
(Pakistan)	Ali Shafiq	3	12.0	5	19.60	2/31	0	0
(Pakistan)	Muhammad Shehzad	3	4.0	3	12.00	2/2	0	0

Source: Cricinfo
