= Kotli Lions in 2021 =

1st season of Kotli Lions in the Kashmir Premier League

Kotli Lions
2021 season
- Coach: Abdul Razzaq
- Captain: Kamran Akmal
- KPL 2021: 6th
- Most runs: Ahsan Ali (217)
- Most wickets: Khurram Shahzad (7)

Kotli Lions is a franchise cricket team that represents Kotli in the Kashmir Premier League. They were coached by Abdul Razzaq and captained by Kamran Akmal. Fakhar Zaman was originally appointed as captain but Kamran Akmal had to replace him due to the Pakistani tour of the West Indies.

== Squad ==
- Players with international caps are listed in **bold**.
- Ages are correct as of 3 July 2021

No.	Name	Nationality	Birth date	Category	Batting style	Bowling style	Year signed	Notes
Batsmen
12	**Abdullah Syed**	United States	30 September 1989 (aged 31)	Emerging	Right-handed	Right-arm off break	2021	
12	**Ahsan Ali**	Pakistan	10 December 1993 (aged 27)	Silver	Right-handed	Leg break	2021	Post-draft signing
45	**Asif Ali**	Pakistan	1 October 1991 (aged 29)	Diamond	Right-handed	Right-arm off break	2021	
N/A	**Fakhar Zaman**	Pakistan	13 April 1990 (aged 31)	Icon	Left-handed	Left-arm orthodox spin	2021	
N/A	Syed Hashim Ali	Pakistan		Emerging	Left-handed		2021	
All-rounders
44	Khalid Usman	Pakistan	1 March 1986 (aged 35)	Silver	Right-handed	Left-arm orthodox spin	2021	
48	Hasan Raza	Pakistan	1 June 1995 (aged 26)	Emerging	Left-handed	Right-arm medium-fast	2021	
97	Saif Badar	Pakistan	3 July 1998 (aged 23)	Silver	Right-handed	Leg break	2021	Post-draft signing
Wicket-keepers
23	**Kamran Akmal**	Pakistan	13 January 1982 (aged 39)	Platinum	Right-handed	Right-arm medium	2021	Captain
59	Junaid Ali	Pakistan	6 December 1995 (aged 25)	Silver	Right-handed		2021	
N/A	Abdul Rehman	Pakistan		Emerging			2021	
Bowlers
03	Mujtaba Ghayas	Pakistan	27 July 1987 (aged 33)	Emerging	Right-handed	Right-arm medium	2021	Post-draft signing
5	Nadeem Khalil	Pakistan	1 November 1997 (aged 23)	Emerging	Right-handed	Right-arm fast-medium	2021	Post-draft signing
17	**Imran Khan**	Pakistan	15 July 1987 (aged 33)	Gold	Right-handed	Right-arm fast-medium	2021	
88	Akif Javed	Pakistan	10 October 2000 (aged 20)	Gold	Right-handed	Left-arm medium-fast	2021	
97	Irfanullah Shah	Pakistan	5 May 1995 (aged 26)	Silver	Right-handed	Right-arm medium-fast	2021	
100	Khurram Shehzad	Pakistan	25 November 1999 (aged 21)	Silver	Right-handed	Right-arm medium	2021	Post-draft signing
N/A	**Monty Panesar**	England	25 April 1982 (aged 39)	Overseas	Left-handed	Left-arm orthodox spin	2021	Overseas; Pulled out of the tournament
N/A	**Usman Qadir**	Pakistan	10 August 1993 (aged 27)	Diamond	Left-handed	Right-arm leg break	2021	
N/A	Yasir Jan	Pakistan		Emerging			2021	

== Season standings ==
=== Points table ===
Pos	Team	Pld	W	L	NR	Pts	NRR
1	Rawalakot Hawks (C)	5	3	1	1	7	0.228
2	Muzaffarabad Tigers (R)	5	3	2	0	6	0.530
3	Mirpur Royals (3rd)	5	3	2	0	6	−0.323
4	Overseas Warriors (4th)	5	2	3	0	4	−0.032
5	Bagh Stallions	5	2	3	0	4	−0.201
6	Kotli Lions	5	1	3	1	3	−0.107

Source: ESPNcricinfo
- Top 4 teams qualified for the playoffs
- Advanced to Qualifier
- Advanced to Eliminator 1

Notes:

- C = Champions;
- R = Runner-up;
- (x) = Position at the end of the tournament;

== League fixtures and results ==
Match 2
7 August 2021
14:00
Scorecard

Kotli Lions; 169 (20 overs)	v	Bagh Stallions; 172/5 (19.4 overs)
Ahsan Ali 51 (37); Mohammad Imran 3/25 (4 overs)		Asad Shafiq 43* (27); Imran Khan 3/30 (4 overs)

Bagh Stallions won by 5 wickets
Muzaffarabad Cricket Stadium, Muzaffarabad
Umpires: Ahsan Raza (Pak) and Ahmed Shahab (Pak)
Player of the match: Ahsan Ali (Kotli Lions)

- Kotli Lions won the toss and elected to bat.

Match 5
8 August 2021
19:30 (N)
Scorecard

Rawalakot Hawks	v	Kotli Lions

Match Abandoned
Muzaffarabad Cricket Stadium, Muzaffarabad

Match 8
10 August 2021
14:00
Scorecard

Kotli Lions; 195/4 (20 overs)	v	Muzaffarabad Tigers; 196/5 (18.3 overs)
Asif Ali 67 (34); Mohammad Hafeez 1/10 (1 over)		Zeeshan Ashraf 107* (62); Akif Javed 2/46 (4 overs)

Muzaffarabad Tigers won by 5 wickets
Muzaffarabad Cricket Stadium, Muzaffarabad
Umpires: Ghaffar Kazmi (Pak) and Rashid Riaz (Pak)
Player of the match: Zeeshan Ashraf (Muzaffarabad Tigers)

- Kotli Lions won the toss and elected to bat
- Zeeshan Ashraf scored the first century in KPL history

Match 11
11 August 2021
19:30 (N)
Scorecard

Mirpur Royals; 211/6 (20 overs)	v	Kotli Lions; 211/8 (20 overs)
Mukhtar Ahmed 61 (38); Mujtaba Ghayyas 2/23 (3 overs)		Ahsan Ali 99 (47); Salman Irshad 3/39 (4 overs)

Match Tied (Mirpur Royals won the Super Over)
Muzaffarabad Cricket Stadium, Muzaffarabad
Umpires: Ahmed Shahab (Pak) and Faisal Afridi (Pak)
Player of the match: Ahsan Ali (Kotli Lions)

- Kotli Lions won the toss and elected to field
- Super Over: Kotli Lions 2 all out, Mirpur Royals 4/0.

Match 14
13 August 2021
10:30
Scorecard

Overseas Warriors; 211/6 (20 overs)	v	Kotli Lions; 215/2 (19 overs)
Nasir Nawaz 66 (44); Khurram Shahzad 3/39 (4 overs)		Kamran Akmal 60 (35); Faizan Saleem 1/15 (2 overs)

Kotli Lions won by 8 wickets
Muzaffarabad Cricket Stadium, Muzaffarabad
Player of the match: Kamran Akmal (Kotli Lions)

- Kotli Lions won the toss and elected to field

== Statistics ==
=== Most runs ===
Nat.	Player	Matches	Innings	Runs	Average	HS	100	50
(Pakistan)	Ahsan Ali	4	4	217	72.33	99	0	3
(Pakistan)	Asif Ali	4	4	142	47.33	67	0	1
(Pakistan)	Kamran Akmal	4	4	102	25.50	60	0	1
(Pakistan)	Saif Badar	4	3	89	44.50	39	0	0
(United States)	Abdullah Syed	3	3	58	19.33	35	0	0

=== Most wickets ===
Nat.	Player	Matches	Overs	Wickets	Average	BBI	4w	5w
(Pakistan)	Khurram Shahzad	4	15.0	7	21.28	3/39	0	0
(Pakistan)	Imran Khan	4	15.3	4	37.50	3/30	0	0
(Pakistan)	Mujtaba Ghayyas	2	5.0	2	26.00	2/23	0	0
(Pakistan)	Akif Javed	2	8.0	2	38.00	2/46	0	0
(Pakistan)	Irfanullah Shah	3	12.0	2	54.50	1/35	0	0
