= 2017 Pakistan Cup =

Cricket tournament

- Dates: 16 April 2017 – 29 April 2017
- Administrator: Pakistan Cricket Board
- Cricket format: List A
- Tournament format(s): Round-robin and final
- Host: Rawalpindi
- Champions: Federal Areas (1st title)
- Participants: 5
- Matches: 11
- Most runs: Mohammad Hafeez (362)
- Most wickets: Aamer Yamin (9)

The 2017 Pakistan Cup was the second edition of the Pakistan Cup, a List A cricket competition. It was held from 16 to 29 April 2017, with all the matches played at the Rawalpindi Cricket Stadium, Rawalpindi. It was contested between five teams, with the squads for the tournament announced on 21 March 2017. Federal Areas won the tournament, beating Balochistan by one wicket in the final.

== Squads ==
Prior to the start of the tournament, the following squads were announced:

Baluchistan	Federal Areas	Khyber Pakhtunkhwa	Punjab	Sindh
Fakhar Zaman (c); Ghulam Mudassar; Bismillah Khan (wk); Imam-ul-Haq; Sohaib Maqsood; Saad Ali; Usman Shinwari; Khalid Usman; Azizullah; Agha Salman; Aamer Yamin; Sahibzada Farhan; Rameez Aziz; Taimur Khan; Hamal Wahab	Imad Wasim (c); Hassan Khan; Zohaib Ahmed; Haris Sohail; Sami Aslam; Abid Ali (wk); Sohail Khan; Mohammad Abbas; Sameen Gul; Mohammad Hafeez; Hussain Talat; Rohail Nazir; Mohammad Irfan; Sarmad Bhatti; Abdullah Shafique	Mohammad Rizwan (c, wk); Shadab Khan; Iftikhar Ahmed; Israrullah; Adil Amin; Imran Butt; Mohammad Sami; Waqas Maqsood; Zafar Gohar; Shoaib Malik; Kashif Bhatti; Mohammad Naeem; Taj Wali; Imran Khan; Nabi Gul	Umar Akmal (c); Nasir Nawaz; Kamran Akmal (wk); Salman Butt; Umar Amin; Khushdil Shah; Zulfiqar Babar; Junaid Khan; Bilawal Bhatti; Faheem Ashraf; Hammad Azam; Raza Ali Dar; Abdul Rehman Muzammil; Saad Nasim; Arsal Sheikh	Anwar Ali (c); Saif Badar; Khurram Manzoor; Fawad Alam; Asif Zakir; Zain Abbas; Rumman Raees; Usama Mir; Mir Hamza; Mohammad Nawaz; Akbar-ur-Rehman; Mohammad Hasan (wk); Umar Gul; Saud Shakeel; Hasan Mohsin

== Group stage ==
=== Points table ===
Pos	Team	Pld	W	L	T	NR	Pts	NRR
1	Baluchistan	4	3	1	0	0	6	0.079
2	Federal Areas	4	2	1	0	1	5	0.017
3	Sindh	4	2	2	0	0	4	0.884
4	Punjab	4	1	2	0	1	3	−0.040
5	Khyber Pakhtunkhwa	4	1	3	0	0	2	−0.931

Source: ESPNcricinfo

Teams qualified for the final

=== Fixtures ===
16 April 2017
14:00 (D/N)
Scorecard

Punjab; 275 (48.5 overs)	v	Baluchistan; 279/6 (48.5 overs)
Umar Amin 156 (142); Aamer Yamin 5/77 (9.4 overs)		Fakhar Zaman 62 (60); Arsal Sheikh 2/26 (5 overs)

Baluchistan won by 4 wickets
Rawalpindi Cricket Stadium, Rawalpindi
Umpires: Ahsan Raza and Zameer Haider
Player of the match: Aamer Yamin (Baluchistan) and Umar Amin (Punjab)

- Punjab won the toss and elected to bat.

17 April 2017
14:00 (D/N)
Scorecard

Federal Areas; 351/5 (50 overs)	v	Khyber Pakhtunkhwa; 326 (49 overs)
Mohammad Hafeez 123 (117); Waqas Maqsood 3/68 (10 overs)		Shoaib Malik 72 (49); Ehsan Adil 3/54 (7 overs)

Federal Areas won by 25 runs
Rawalpindi Cricket Stadium, Rawalpindi
Umpires: Ghaffar Kazmi and Zameer Haider
Player of the match: Mohammad Hafeez (Federal Areas)

- Federal Areas won the toss and elected to bat.
- Nabi Gul (Khyber Pakhtunkhwa) made his List A debut.

18 April 2017
14:00 (D/N)
Scorecard

Baluchistan; 298/7 (50 overs)	v	Sindh; 279/7 (50 overs)
Fakhar Zaman 59 (69); Mohammad Nawaz 2/49 (9 overs)		Fawad Alam 130 (117); Aamer Yamin 2/40 (8 overs)

Baluchistan won by 19 runs
Rawalpindi Cricket Stadium, Rawalpindi
Umpires: Ahsan Raza and Ghaffar Kazmi
Player of the match: Aamer Yamin (Baluchistan)

- Sindh won the toss and elected to field.
- Hasan Mohsin (Sindh) made his List A debut.

19 April 2017
14:00 (D/N)
Scorecard

Khyber Pakhtunkhwa; 313/5 (50 overs)	v	Punjab; 278 (46.3 overs)
Shoaib Malik 80* (54); Bilal Asif 2/46 (10 overs)		Umar Akmal 77 (75); Imran Khan 5/57 (9.3 overs)

Khyber Pakhtunkhwa won by 35 runs
Rawalpindi Cricket Stadium, Rawalpindi
Umpires: Asif Yaqoob and Rashid Riaz
Player of the match: Imran Khan (Khyber Pakhtunkhwa)

- Khyber Pakhtunkhwa won the toss and elected to bat.
- Nasir Nawaz (Punjab) made his List A debut.

20 April 2017
14:00 (D/N)
Scorecard

Federal Areas; 284/7 (50 overs)	v	Sindh; 157/1 (26.2 overs)
Haris Sohail 117 (116); Anwar Ali 2/51 (9 overs)		Asif Zakir 54* (67); Hassan Khan 1/20 (5 overs)

Sindh won by 44 runs (D/L method)
Rawalpindi Cricket Stadium, Rawalpindi
Umpires: Asif Yaqoob and Rashid Riaz
Player of the match: Haris Sohail (Federal Areas)

- Federal Areas won the toss and elected to bat.
- Rain interrupted the match during Sindh's innings and the target was revised to 114 runs.

22 April 2017
14:00
Scorecard

Khyber Pakhtunkhwa; 323/5 (50 overs)	v	Baluchistan; 212/3 (36 overs)
Iftikhar Ahmed 138* (129); Azizullah 2/75 (10 overs)		Fakhar Zaman 73 (69); Zafar Gohar 2/48 (8 overs)

Baluchistan won by 4 runs (D/L method)
Rawalpindi Cricket Stadium, Rawalpindi
Umpires: Riazuddin and Shozab Raza
Player of the match: Fakhar Zaman (Baluchistan)

- Khyber Pakhtunkhwa won the toss and elected to bat.
- Rain interrupted the match during Baluchistan's innings and the target was revised to 208 runs.

23 April 2017
14:00
Scorecard

Federal Areas; 236/4 (38.2 overs)	v	Punjab
Mohammad Hafeez 65 (77); Faheem Ashraf 1/19 (5 overs)

No result
Rawalpindi Cricket Stadium, Rawalpindi
Umpires: Khalid Mahmood and Riazuddin

- Punjab won the toss and elected to field.
- Rain stopped play in the 38th over of Federal Area's innings with no further play possible.

25 April 2017
16:00
Scorecard

Khyber Pakhtunkhwa; 192 (39.4 overs)	v	Sindh; 193/2 (22.4 overs)
Shoaib Malik 41 (49); Umar Gul 4/44 (10 overs)		Khurram Manzoor 118* (61); Taj Wali 1/45 (5 overs)

Sindh won by 8 wickets
Rawalpindi Cricket Stadium, Rawalpindi
Umpires: Rashid Riaz and Riazuddin
Player of the match: Khurram Manzoor (Sindh)

- Khyber Pakhtunkhwa won the toss and elected to bat.
- Asad Raza (Khyber Pakhtunkhwa) made his List A debut.

26 April 2017
16:00 (D/N)
Scorecard

Baluchistan; 375/7 (50 overs)	v	Federal Areas; 378/6 (47.2 overs)
Fakhar Zaman 104 (81); Mohammad Irfan 2/58 (7 overs)		Sami Aslam 169 (126); Rameez Aziz 2/38 (6.3 overs)

Federal Areas won by 4 wickets
Rawalpindi Cricket Stadium, Rawalpindi
Umpires: Khalid Mahmood and Shozab Raza
Player of the match: Sami Aslam (Federal Areas)

- Balochistan won the toss and elected to bat.

27 April 2017
16:00 (D/N)
Scorecard

Punjab; 337/9 (50 overs)	v	Sindh; 297 (47.4 overs)
Umar Amin 111 (99); Mir Hamza 4/70 (10 overs)		Akbar-ur-Rehman 83 (92); Faheem Ashraf 5/45 (8.4 overs)

Punjab won by 40 runs
Rawalpindi Cricket Stadium, Rawalpindi
Umpires: Ahsan Raza and Riazuddin
Player of the match: Umar Amin (Punjab)

- Sindh won the toss and elected to field.

== Final ==
29 April 2017
15:00 (D/N)
Scorecard

Baluchistan; 323/9 (50 overs)	v	Federal Areas; 327/9 (50 overs)
Sahibzada Farhan 112 (94); Mohammad Hafeez 3/63 (9 overs)		Sami Aslam 109 (109); Sohail Tanvir 3/49 (10 overs)

Federal Areas won by 1 wicket
Rawalpindi Cricket Stadium, Rawalpindi
Umpires: Ahsan Raza and Riazuddin
Player of the match: Sami Aslam (Federal Areas)

- Federal Areas won the toss and elected to field.
