= Mohammad Umar (Sindh cricketer) =

Pakistani cricketer (born 1999)

Personal information
- Born: 27 December 1999 (age 26); Karachi, Sindh, Pakistan
- Height: 6 ft (183 cm)
- Batting: Right-handed
- Bowling: Right-arm medium
- Role: Bowler

Domestic team information
- Years: Team
- 2020/21: Sindh
- 2021: Multan Sultans (squad no. 3)
- 2022: Peshawar Zalmi (squad no. 11)
- Source: Cricinfo, 4 February 2022

Mohammad Umar (born 27 December 1999) is a Pakistani cricketer.

== Domestic career ==
He made his first-class debut for Karachi Whites in the 2018–19 Quaid-e-Azam Trophy on 1 September 2018, claiming four wickets for 82 runs in the match.

He made his List A debut for Karachi Whites in the 2018–19 Quaid-e-Azam One Day Cup on 6 September 2018.

He made his Twenty20 debut on 21 February 2021, for Multan Sultans in the 2021 Pakistan Super League.
