= Hamal Wahab =

Pakistani cricketer (born 1994)

Personal information
- Born: 9 November 1994 (age 32); Panjgur, Pakistan
- Source: Cricinfo, 16 April 2017

Hamal Wahab (born 9 November 1994) is a Pakistani cricketer. He made his first-class debut for Quetta in the 2012–13 Quaid-e-Azam Trophy on 25 January 2013.
