= Sajjad Ali (cricketer, born 1990) =

Pakistani cricketer (born 1990)

Personal information
- Born: 3 February 1990 (age 36); Mardan, Pakistan
- Source: Cricinfo, 5 October 2018

Sajjad Ali (born 3 February 1990) is a Pakistani cricketer. He made his List A debut for Habib Bank Limited in the 2018–19 Quaid-e-Azam One Day Cup on 30 September 2018. He made his first-class debut for Habib Bank Limited in the 2018–19 Quaid-e-Azam Trophy on 3 October 2018.
