= Maaz Khan (cricketer) =

Pakistani cricketer (born 1998)

Personal information
- Born: 1 March 2003 (age 23); Bajaur, Khyber Pakhtunkhwa, Pakistan
- Batting: Right-handed
- Bowling: Right-arm Leg Break Googly
- Role: Bowler

Domestic team information
- Years: Team
- 2020–: Lahore Qalandars (squad no. 55)
- 2026: Lahore Qalandars (squad no. 55)
- Source: , 28 February 2020

Maaz Khan (Urdu: معاذ خان; born 1 March 2003) is a Pakistani cricketer. He made his Twenty20 debut for the Lahore Qalandars in the 2018 Abu Dhabi T20 Trophy on 6 October 2018.

He belongs from Bajaur District.

He made his List A debut on 26 March 2022, for Khyber Pakhtunkhwa in the 2021–22 Pakistan Cup.
