= Ahmed Khan (cricketer) =

Pakistani cricketer (born 2004)

Ahmed Khan احمد خان
Personal information
- Full name: Ahmed Khan
- Born: 1 May 2004 (age 22); Swabi, Khyber Pakhtunkhwa, Pakistan
- Batting: Right-handed
- Bowling: Right-arm medium-fast
- Role: All rounder

Domestic team information
- Years: Team
- 2021/22: Khyber Pakhtunkhwa
- 2022: Sebastianites Cricket and Athletic Club
- 2022: Jammu Janbaz
- 2023/24: Abbottabad

Career statistics
Competition	FC	LA	T20
Matches	2	1	16
Runs scored	6	44	123
Batting average	3.00	44.00	15.37
100s/50s	0/0	0/0	0/0
Top score	6	44	25*
Balls bowled	66	24	12
Wickets	2	0	0
Bowling average	24.50	–	–
5 wickets in innings	0	0	0
10 wickets in match	0	0	0
Best bowling	2/19	0/20	0/9
Catches/stumpings	1/–	0/–	6/–
- Source: Cricinfo, 24 September 2022

Ahmed Khan (Urdu: احمد خان) (born 1 May 2004 in Swabi, Khyber Pakhtunkhwa) is a Pakistani cricketer who plays for Abbottabad. Khan made his List A debut for Khyber Pakhtunkhwa against Sindh on 8 March 2022 during the 2021–22 Pakistan Cup. He made his T20 debut for Sebastianites Cricket and Athletic Club against Tamil Union Cricket and Athletic Club on 23 May 2022 during the 2022 Major Clubs T20 Tournament. Khan played for the Pakistan national under-19 cricket team during the 2022 ICC Under-19 Cricket World Cup.
