= Musaddiq Ahmed =

Pakistan-born German cricketer

Personal information
- Born: 1 May 1989 (age 37); Nowshehra, Pakhtunkhwa, Pakistan
- Batting: Right-handed
- Role: Batsman
- Source: Cricinfo, 18 December 2015

Musaddiq Ahmed (born 1 May 1989) is a Pakistan-born German cricketer who played for Khyber Pakhtunkhwa. In September 2019, he was named in Khyber Pakhtunkhwa's squad for the 2019–20 Quaid-e-Azam Trophy tournament. In January 2021, he was named in Khyber Pakhtunkhwa's squad for the 2020–21 Pakistan Cup. On the opening day of the tournament, he scored 103 not out, his first century in List A cricket. He made his debut for German national cricket team in July 2024 against Gibraltar.
