= Atif Sheikh =

English cricketer

Personal information
- Full name: Atif Sheikh
- Born: 18 February 1991 (age 35); Nottingham, England
- Batting: Right-handed
- Bowling: Left-arm medium-fast
- Role: Bowler

Domestic team information
- Years: Team
- 2010: Derbyshire
- 2014–2016: Leicestershire (squad no. 3)
- 2017: Northamptonshire
- FC debut: 24 May 2010 Derbyshire v Gloucestershire
- LA debut: 6 June 2015 Leicestershire v New Zealanders

Career statistics
Competition	FC	LA	T20
Matches	10	6	8
Runs scored	47	27	21
Batting average	4.70	5.40	10.50
100s/50s	0/0	0/0	0/0
Top score	12	22	14
Balls bowled	1,283	269	144
Wickets	24	6	6
Bowling average	42.12	42.83	30.66
5 wickets in innings	0	0	0
10 wickets in match	0	0	0
Best bowling	4/97	3/49	2/11
Catches/stumpings	3/–	0/–	1/–
- Source: CricketArchive, 5 October 2017

Atif Sheikh (born 18 February 1991) is an English cricketer who played for Derbyshire County Cricket Club. He is a left-arm medium-fast bowler who bats right-handed. He was born in Nottingham, and made his first-class debut for Derbyshire in the 2010 against Gloucestershire, taking five wickets in the match. Sheikh played for Leicestershire in 2014. In February 2017, Sheikh signed for newly promoted Yorkshire league team, Tickhill Cricket Club.
