= Ali Majid =

Pakistani cricketer (born 1991)

Personal information
- Full name: Ali Majid Shah
- Born: 29 December 1991 (age 34); Khanewal, Punjab, Pakistan
- Batting: Right-handed
- Bowling: Right-arm medium
- Role: Bowler

Domestic team information
- Years: Team
- 2021: Lahore Qalandars
- 2022: Peshawar Zalmi (squad no. 5)
- 2025: Quetta Gladiators
- Source: ESPNcricinfo, 22 February 2022

Ali Majid (born 29 December 1991) is a Pakistani cricketer. In February 2021, he made his T20 debut against MCC at Gaddafi Stadium in Lahore. He made his List A debut on 19 March 2022, for Southern Punjab against Khyber Pakhtunkhwa in the 2021–22 Pakistan Cup.
