= Farhan Shafiq =

Pakistani cricketer (born 1999)

Personal information
- Born: 5 December 1999 (age 26)
- Source: Cricinfo, 18 January 2021

Farhan Shafiq (born 5 December 1999) is a Pakistani cricketer. He made his List A debut on 18 January 2021, for Northern against Khyber Pakhtunkhwa, in the 2020–21 Pakistan Cup.
