= Muhammad Akhlaq =

Pakistani cricketer (born 1992)

Personal information
- Full name: Muhammad Akhlaq
- Born: 12 November 1992 (age 34); Gujranwala, Punjab, Pakistan
- Batting: Right-handed
- Bowling: Right-arm medium
- Role: Wicket-keeper

Domestic team information
- Years: Team
- 2019/20–2023: Central Punjab
- 2021–2022: Islamabad United
- 2023: Karachi Kings
- 2025: Lahore Qalandars

Career statistics
Competition	First-class	List A	T20
Matches	34	46	61
Runs scored	1,707	1,379	1,037
Batting average	31.61	32.83	20.33
100s/50s	3/7	4/7	0/7
Top score	202*	117	62
Balls bowled	48	4	–
Wickets	0	0	–
Bowling average	–	–	–
5 wickets in innings	0	0	0
10 wickets in match	0	0	0
Best bowling	–	–	–
Catches/stumpings	44/8	25/6	30/9
- Source: ESPNcricinfo, 21 October 2025

Muhammad Akhlaq (born 12 November 1992) is a Pakistani cricketer who plays as a wicket-keeper batsman. He made his first-class debut for Lahore Lions in the 2014–15 Quaid-e-Azam Trophy on 30 November 2014. In January 2021, he was named in Central Punjab's squad for the 2020–21 Pakistan Cup. In December 2021, he was signed by Islamabad United following the players' draft for the 2022 Pakistan Super League.
