= Umaid Asif =

Pakistani cricketer

Personal information
- Full name: Umaid Asif
- Born: 30 April 1984 (age 42); Sialkot, Punjab, Pakistan
- Height: 6 ft 5 in (196 cm)
- Batting: Right-handed
- Bowling: Right-arm medium fast
- Role: Bowler
- Relatives: Tahir Mughal (uncle)

Domestic team information
- Years: Team
- 2011–2015: Sialkot Stallions (squad no. 13)
- 2018–2019; 2021: Peshawar Zalmi (squad no. 13)
- 2018: Federal Areas
- 2019: Khyber Pakhtunkhwa
- 2019/20: Southern Punjab
- 2020; 2022: Karachi Kings (squad no. 13)
- 2020/21–: Balochistan
- Source: CricInfo, 7 September 2020

Umaid Asif (born 30 April 1984) is a Pakistani cricketer who plays for Peshawar Zalmi. In April 2018, he was named in Federal Areas squad for the 2018 Pakistan Cup.

== Early life ==
The nephew of the late domestic cricketer Tahir Mughal, before becoming a cricketer he used to teach mathematics to A Levels students.

== Career ==
In August 2018, he was one of 33 players to be awarded a central contract for the 2018–19 season by the Pakistan Cricket Board (PCB). In March 2019, he was named in Khyber Pakhtunkhwa's squad for the 2019 Pakistan Cup. In September 2019, he was named in Southern Punjab's squad for the 2019–20 domestic cricket season.

In August 2020, he was named in Balochistan cricket team for 2020–21 domestic season. In January 2021, he was named in Balochistan's squad for the 2020–21 Pakistan Cup. In December 2021, he was signed by the Karachi Kings following the players' draft for the 2022 Pakistan Super League.
