= Ammad Alam =

Pakistani cricketer

Personal information
- Born: 3 October 1998 (age 28); Karachi, Sindh, Pakistan
- Batting: Right-handed

Domestic team information
- Years: Team
- 2017–18: United Bank Limited
- 2018–19: Sui Southern Gas Company
- 2023–present: Karachi Whites (squad no. 07)
- Source: Cricinfo, 28 October 2017

Ammad Alam (born 3 October 1998) is a Pakistani cricketer. He made his first-class debut for United Bank Limited in the 2017–18 Quaid-e-Azam Trophy on 27 October 2017. In December 2017, he was named in Pakistan's squad for the 2018 Under-19 Cricket World Cup.

He made his List A debut for Sui Southern Gas Company against Multan in the 2018–19 Quaid-e-Azam One Day Cup on 22 September 2018.

== Early life and career ==
Growing up in Nazimabad, Karachi, Alam developed an early interest in cricket, playing tape ball cricket in his neighborhood.

In 2008, he joined the Asghar Ali Shah Academy's summer camp, marking his first encounter with hard-ball cricket. Initially, his parents were indifferent, but they eventually supported his passion. By 2011, he was playing club cricket for Sir Syed CC, which led to his selection for the Karachi Regional Under-16 side in 2012.

In 2014, Alam was selected for the Karachi Regional Under-16 team after three years of trials. In the PCB-Pepsi Cricket Stars U-16 Two Day Tournament, he scored 322 runs in five matches, with an average of 46, including three fifties, making him the fourth-highest run-scorer.

His success at the Under-16 level led to his selection for the Pakistan Under-17 tour of England in 2014. Despite being part of a talented team, Alam struggled to perform in the unfamiliar conditions of his first overseas tour.

In 2015, Alam joined the Karachi Whites Under-19s team, scoring 157 runs in seven matches during the Inter Region Under-19 One Day Tournament (2015/16). He also excelled in the Inter-Region Under-19 Three Day Tournament, amassing 426 runs in five matches, including a century and two fifties. Additionally, he scored 407 runs in six matches during the Inter-District Under-19 Tournament, featuring another century and two fifties.

In 2017, Alam was selected for the Karachi Kings squad for the Pakistan Super League (PSL). Although he missed out on the Pakistan Under-19 squad for the 2016 Asia Cup due to age restrictions, he and Abrar Ahmed were invited to the Karachi Kings trials. His selection was confirmed during the announcement of the emerging category players. Although he did not play in any matches.
