= Taimoor Sultan =

Pakistani cricketer (born 1994)

Personal information
- Born: 4 December 1994 (age 31); Sargodha, Punjab, Pakistan
- Batting: Right-handed
- Role: Opening batsman

Domestic team information
- Years: Team
- 2018–: Peshawar Zalmi

Career statistics
Competition	FC	LA	T20
Matches	11	19	9
Runs scored	375	403	129
Batting average	19.73	21.21	16.12
100s/50s	1/1	1/0	0/0
Top score	102	102	36
Balls bowled	30	6	0
Wickets	0	1	0
Bowling average	–	6.00	–
5 wickets in innings	0	0	0
10 wickets in match	0	0	0
Best bowling	–	1/6	–
Catches/stumpings	10/–	4/–	6/–
- Source: Cricinfo, 20 April 2025

Taimoor Sultan (born 4 December 1994) is a Pakistani cricketer who plays for Northern. He made his first-class debut on 23 November 2015, for Sui Northern Gas Pipelines Limited in the 2015–16 Quaid-e-Azam Trophy. In January 2021, he was named in Northern's squad for the 2020–21 Pakistan Cup.
