= Hasan Mohsin =

Pakistani cricketer (born 1998)

Personal information
- Born: 11 January 1998 (age 28); Karachi, Sindh, Pakistan
- Height: 5 ft 9 in (175 cm)
- Batting: Right-handed
- Bowling: Right-arm medium
- Role: All-rounder

Domestic team information
- Years: Team
- 2017–2021/22: Sindh
- 2017/18–2023/24: Pakistan TV
- 2018/19: Multan
- 2023/24: Karachi Blues
- Source: Cricinfo, 11 May 2025

Hasan Mohsin (born 11 January 1998) is a Pakistani cricketer. He made his List A debut for Sindh in the 2017 Pakistan Cup on 18 April 2017. Prior to his List A debut, he was named in Pakistan's squad for the 2016 Under-19 Cricket World Cup. He made his first-class debut for Pakistan Television in the 2017–18 Quaid-e-Azam Trophy on 3 October 2017. He made his Twenty20 debut for Multan in the 2018–19 National T20 Cup on 11 December 2018.

In September 2019, he was named in Sindh's squad for the 2019–20 Quaid-e-Azam Trophy tournament. In November 2019, he was named in Pakistan's squad for the 2019 ACC Emerging Teams Asia Cup in Bangladesh.

In April 2024, he moved to America to pursue his cricket career.
