= Imran Khan (cricketer, born 1987) =

Pakistani cricketer (born 1987)

Personal information
- Full name: Mohammad Imran Khan
- Born: 15 July 1987 (age 39); Lower Dir District, Khyber Pakhtunkhwa, Pakistan
- Batting: Right-handed
- Bowling: Right-arm medium-fast
- Role: Bowler

International information
- National side: Pakistan (2014–2019)
- Test debut (cap 218): 20 October 2014 v Australia
- Last Test: 21 November 2019 v Australia

Domestic team information
- Years: Team
- 2019–present: Khyber Pakhtunkhwa
- 2021–present: Multan Sultans

Career statistics
Competition	Test	FC	LA	T20
Matches	10	113	74	77
Runs scored	16	709	181	16
Batting average	2.28	6.62	6.96	4.00
100s/50s	0/0	0/0	0/0	0/0
Top score	6	32	18*	11
Balls bowled	1,636	16,729	3,439	1,633
Wickets	29	382	92	85
Bowling average	31.62	25.27	34.27	25.14
5 wickets in innings	1	20	3	0
10 wickets in match	0	3	0	0
Best bowling	5/58	9/69	6/48	4/20
Catches/stumpings	0/–	11/–	16/–	10/–
- Source: ESPNcricinfo, 22 March 2022

Mohammad Imran Khan (Pashto: عمران خان; born 15 July 1987) is a Pakistani cricketer, born in Maidan valley of Lower Dir in Khyber Pakhtunkhwa. He made his Test match debut for Pakistan against Australia in the United Arab Emirates on 22 October 2014. Imran has played domestically for Peshawar, Khyber Pakhtunkhwa, the Water and Power Development Authority, the National Bank of Pakistan, Zarai Taraqiati Bank, and the Peshawar Panthers.

== Career ==
Imran and the Panthers team won the 2014–15 edition of the Haier T20 Cup, where another member of the tournament-winning team was Imran Khan (born 1988). For this reason, Imran Khan (born 1987), the subject of this article, is often recorded as "Mohammad Imran Khan" or "Imran Khan, Sr." on scorecards, while Imran Khan (born 1988) is often recorded as "Imran Khan (Swat)" or "Imran Khan, Jr.".

He was the leading wicket-taker for Khyber Pakhtunkhwa in the 2017 Pakistan Cup, with six dismissals in three matches.

In April 2018, he was named in Punjab's squad for the 2018 Pakistan Cup. In September 2019, he was named in Khyber Pakhtunkhwa's squad for the 2019–20 Quaid-e-Azam Trophy tournament.

In October 2019, he was recalled to Pakistan's Test squad, for the series against Australia, where he took a single wicket in the game he played. Khan last played Test cricket in January 2017. In December 2019, he was named in Pakistan's Test squad for the two-match series against Sri Lanka.

In June 2020, he was named in a 29-man squad for Pakistan's tour to England during the COVID-19 pandemic. However, on 23 June 2020, Khan was one of seven players from Pakistan's squad to test positive for COVID-19. In July, he was shortlisted in Pakistan's 20-man squad for the Test matches against England.

In January 2021, he was named in Khyber Pakhtunkhwa's squad for the 2020–21 Pakistan Cup. He was the leading wicket-taker in the 2021–22 National T20 Cup, with sixteen dismissals.
