= Aamer Yamin =

Pakistani cricketer

Personal information
- Born: 26 June 1990 (age 36); Multan, Punjab, Pakistan
- Batting: Right-handed
- Bowling: Right-arm medium
- Role: All-rounder

International information
- National side: Pakistan
- ODI debut (cap 205): 1 October 2015 v Zimbabwe
- Last ODI: 5 October 2015 v Zimbabwe
- T20I debut (cap 66): 30 November 2015 2015 v England
- Last T20I: 28 January 2018 v New Zealand

Domestic team information
- Years: Team
- 2009/10: Pakistan Customs
- 2014–2015: Multan Tigers
- 2016: Peshawar Zalmi
- 2017–2018: Lahore Qalandars
- 2019–present: Karachi Kings (squad no. 12)
- 2019/20–present: Southern Punjab
- 2019–20: Khulna Tigers
- Source: Cricinfo, 22 January 2021

Aamer Yamin (born 26 June 1990) is a Pakistani cricketer. He was named in Pakistan's Twenty20 International (T20I) squad for their series against England in the UAE in September 2015. He made his One Day International debut for Pakistan against Zimbabwe on 1 October 2015. He made his Twenty20 International debut for Pakistan against England on 30 November 2015. He represented Lahore Qalandars in the second edition of the Pakistan Super League.

In April 2018, he was named in Sindh's squad for the 2018 Pakistan Cup. In October 2018, he was named in the squad for the Comilla Victorians team, following the draft for the 2018–19 Bangladesh Premier League. In March 2019, he was named in Sindh's squad for the 2019 Pakistan Cup. In September 2019, he was named in Southern Punjab's squad for the 2019–20 Quaid-e-Azam Trophy tournament. In October 2019, the Pakistan Cricket Board (PCB) named him as one of the six players to watch ahead of the 2019–20 National T20 Cup tournament.

In December 2021, he was signed by the Karachi Kings following the players' draft for the 2022 Pakistan Super League.
