= Arshad Iqbal =

Pakistani cricketer (born 2000)

Personal information
- Born: 26 December 2000 (age 25); Maniri Payan, Khyber Pakhtunkhwa, Pakistan
- Height: 6 ft 2 in (188 cm)
- Batting: Right-handed
- Bowling: Right-arm medium-fast
- Role: Bowler

International information
- National side: Pakistan (2021–2023)
- T20I debut (cap 92): 23 April 2021 v Zimbabwe
- Last T20I: 7 October 2023 v Bangladesh

Domestic team information
- Years: Team
- 2020–2021: Karachi Kings (squad no. 32)
- 2022-2023: Peshawar Zalmi (squad no. 35)
- 2026: Multan Sultans

Career statistics
Competition	T20I	FC	LA	T20
Matches	3	18	25	64
Runs scored	0	215	47	31
Batting average	0.00	9.77	4.70	3.44
100s/50s	0/0	0/1	0/0	0/0
Top score	0	62	10*	11*
Balls bowled	54	3,235	1,141	1,311
Wickets	4	61	39	68
Bowling average	13.25	29.73	27.61	26.66
5 wickets in innings	0	0	2	0
10 wickets in match	0	0	0	0
Best bowling	3/14	4/31	5/37	3/12
Catches/stumpings	0/–	5/–	7/–	8/–
- Source: Cricinfo, 20 April 2025

Arshad Iqbal (born 26 December 2000) is a Pakistani cricketer. He made his international debut for the Pakistan cricket team in April 2021.

== Early life ==
Iqbal was born in the village of Maniri Payan in the Swabi District of Khyber Pakhtunkhwa. He hails from a family with a military background, the son of Captain (r) Gul Haidar, and considers Wasim Akram as his cricketing inspiration.

== Domestic career ==
He made his List A debut for Water and Power Development Authority (WAPDA) in the 2018–19 Quaid-e-Azam One Day Cup on 16 October 2018. Prior to his List A debut, he was named in Pakistan's squad for the 2018 Under-19 Cricket World Cup.

He made his first-class debut for WAPDA in the 2018–19 Quaid-e-Azam Trophy on 19 October 2018. He made his Twenty20 debut for Karachi Whites in the 2018–19 National T20 Cup on 13 December 2018. In January 2021, he was named in Khyber Pakhtunkhwa's squad for the 2020–21 Pakistan Cup.

== International career ==
In March 2021, he was named in Pakistan's Twenty20 International (T20I) squad for their tours to South Africa and Zimbabwe. He made his T20I debut on 23 April 2021, for Pakistan against Zimbabwe. In October 2021, he was named in the Pakistan Shaheens squad for their tour of Sri Lanka.
