= Southern Punjab cricket team (Pakistan) =

Pakistani first-class cricket team

Personnel
- Captain: Shan Masood
- Coach: Ramiz Raja
- Owner: Southern Punjab Cricket Association

Team information
- Colors: Maroon Green
- Founded: 2019; 7 years ago
- Dissolved: 2023; 3 years ago
- Home ground: Multan Cricket Stadium, Multan
- Secondary home ground(s): Bahawal Stadium, Bahawalpur

History
- Quaid-e-Azam Trophy wins: 0
- Pakistan Cup wins: 0
- National T20 Cup wins: 0
First-class
List A / T20

Southern Punjab cricket team was a domestic cricket team in Pakistan representing the southern parts of the Punjab province. It competed in domestic first-class, List A and T20 cricket competitions, namely the Quaid-e-Azam Trophy, Pakistan Cup and National T20 Cup. The team was operated by the Southern Punjab Cricket Association.

== History ==
The team was introduced as a part of the new domestic structure announced by the Pakistan Cricket Board (PCB) on 31 August 2019. On 3 September 2019, the PCB confirmed the squad for the team. In December 2020, it was announced that Aaron Summers would play for Southern Punjab in the 2020–21 Pakistan Cup, becoming the first Australian cricketer to play in a domestic cricket competition in Pakistan.

=== 2019/20 Season ===
Southern Punjab finished in fourth and third place respectively in the Quaid-e-Azam Trophy and National T20 Cup. The Pakistan Cup was cancelled this season due to the COVID-19 pandemic.

=== 2020/21 Season ===
The team finished in third, fourth and fifth place respectively, in the Quaid-e-Azam Trophy, Pakistan Cup and the National T20 Cup.

== Structure ==
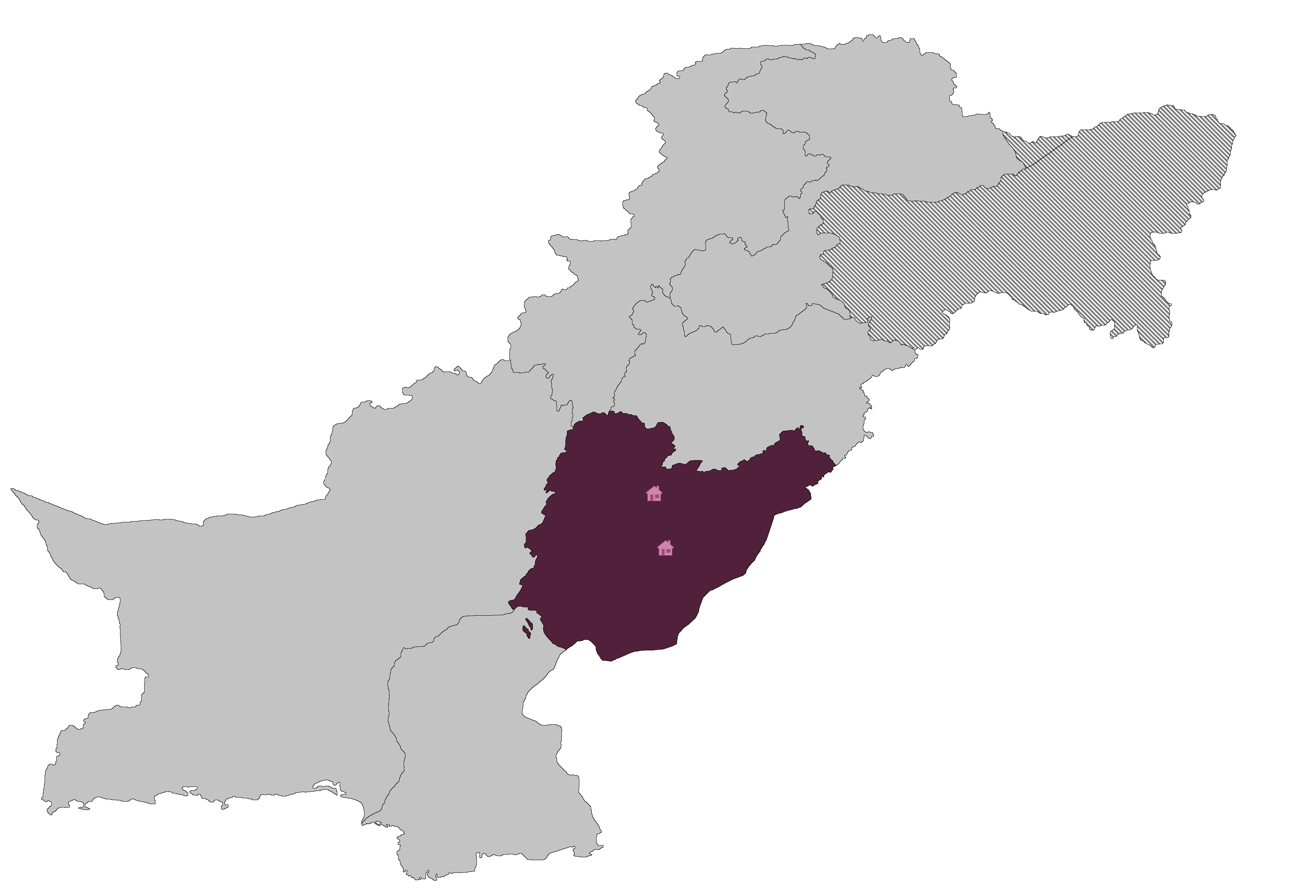
Southern Punjab Cricket Association includes Multan and Bahawalpur

As of 2019, domestic cricket in Pakistan was reorganised into six regional teams (on provincial lines). A three tier bottom-up system is in operation with the Tier 1 teams participating in the Quaid-e-Azam Trophy (First Class), Pakistan Cup (List A) and National T20 Cup (Regional T20). The Tier 2 teams participate in the City Cricket Association Tournament whilst the Tier 3 teams participate in various local tournaments as both tiers feed players to the Tier 1 team.

- Tier 1: Southern Punjab
- Tier 2: Sahiwal, Lodhran, Okara, Multan, Vehari, Khanewal, D.G. Khan, Bahawalnagar, R.Y. Khan, Layyah, Pakpattan, Muzaffargarh, Bahawalpur & Layyah.
- Tier 3: Various clubs and schools.

== See also ==
- Balochistan cricket team
- Central Punjab cricket team
- Khyber Pakhtunkhwa cricket team
- Northern cricket team
- Sindh cricket team
