= Mohammad Imran (cricketer, born 2001) =

Pakistani cricketer (born 2001)

Personal information
- Born: 20 January 2001 (age 25); Swat, Khyber Pakhtunkhwa, Pakistan
- Batting: Right-handed
- Bowling: Left arm medium fast
- Role: Bowler

Domestic team information
- Years: Team
- 2020/21: Khyber Pakhtunkhwa
- 2021: Peshawar Zalmi
- 2022: Karachi Kings (squad no. 14)
- 2024–present: Fortune Barishal

Career statistics
Competition	FC	LA	T20
Matches	8	31	67
Runs scored	151	86	58
Batting average	21.57	6.14	5.80
100s/50s	0/1	0/0	0/0
Top score	55*	19	18*
Balls bowled	1,212	1,424	1,378
Wickets	23	54	80
Bowling average	30.86	26.98	23.70
5 wickets in innings	0	1	1
10 wickets in match	0	0	0
Best bowling	3/47	6/45	6/16
Catches/stumpings	1/–	5/–	10/–
- Source: Cricinfo, 31 August 2026

Mohammad Imran (born 20 January 2001) is a Pakistani cricketer. He made his List A debut on 18 January 2021, for Khyber Pakhtunkhwa against Northern, in the 2020–21 Pakistan Cup. He made his Twenty20 debut on 21 February 2021, for Peshawar Zalmi in the 2021 Pakistan Super League. In December 2021, he was signed by the Karachi Kings following the players' draft for the 2022 Pakistan Super League.
