= Ali Shafiq =

Pakistani cricketer (born 1996)

Ali Shafique
Personal information
- Born: 16 November 1996 (age 29); Daska, Punjab, Pakistan
- Batting: Right-handed
- Bowling: Right-arm Medium fast
- Role: Bowler

Domestic team information
- Years: Team
- 2019: Multan Sultans (squad no. 3)
- Source: Cricinfo, 17 December 2016

Ali Shafique (born 16 November 1996) is a Pakistani cricketer. He made his List A debut for Habib Bank Limited in the 2016–17 Departmental One Day Cup on 17 December 2016. He made his first-class debut for Khan Research Laboratories in the 2017–18 Quaid-e-Azam Trophy on 9 October 2017. He made his Twenty20 debut for Lahore Blues in the 2017–18 National T20 Cup on 18 November 2017. During the 2019 Pakistan Super League tournament he played for Multan Sultans, and was noticed during his first match, with bowling figures of 2/11 off 4 overs against Islamabad United, eventually earning the man-of-the-match award, while pace-wise also clocking at 142 km/h.

In September 2019, he was named in Balochistan's squad for the 2019–20 Quaid-e-Azam Trophy tournament.
