= Irfanullah Shah =

Pakistani cricketer (born 1995)

Personal information
- Full name: Irfanullah Shah
- Born: 5 May 1995 (age 31); Bannu, Khyber Pakhtunkhwa, Pakistan
- Height: 6 ft 4 in (193 cm)
- Batting: Right-handed
- Bowling: Right-arm medium fast
- Role: Bowler

Domestic team information
- Years: Team
- 2014/15–2017/18: Federally Administered Tribal Areas
- 2019/20–: Khyber Pakhtunkhwa

Career statistics
Competition	FC	LA	T20
Matches	36	25	11
Runs scored	210	11	2
Batting average	6.77	2.75	2.00
100s/50s	0/0	0/0	–
Top score	20	8	1*
Balls bowled	5465	866	180
Wickets	122	20	4
Bowling average	24.02	37.75	54.75
5 wickets in innings	6	0	0
10 wickets in match	1	0	0
Best bowling	7/29	4/68	1/22
Catches/stumpings	11/–	5/–	1/–
- Source: Cricinfo, 12 July 2015

Irfanullah Shah (born 5 May 1995) is a cricketer from Bannu, Pakistan. He made his Twenty20 debut on 26 August 2016 for Federally Administered Tribal Areas in the 2016–17 Cool & Cool Present Jazz National T20 Cup.

In January 2021, he was named in Khyber Pakhtunkhwa's squad for the 2020–21 Pakistan Cup. In October 2021, he was named in the Pakistan Shaheens squad for their tour of Sri Lanka.
