= Khurram Manzoor =

Pakistani cricketer (born 1986)

Personal information
- Born: 10 June 1986 (age 40); Karachi, Sindh, Pakistan
- Height: 6 ft 1.5 in (187 cm)
- Batting: Right-handed
- Bowling: Right-arm off break
- Role: Batsman

International information
- National side: Pakistan (2008–2016)
- Test debut (cap 190): 21 February 2009 v Sri Lanka
- Last Test: 14 August 2014 v Sri Lanka
- ODI debut (cap 170): 2 February 2008 v Zimbabwe
- Last ODI: 24 January 2009 v Sri Lanka
- T20I debut (cap 67): 27 February 2016 v India
- Last T20I: 2 March 2016 v Bangladesh

Domestic team information
- Years: Team
- 2002–2003: Karachi Blues
- 2004–2005, 2023–present: Karachi Whites (squad no. 42)
- 2004: Karachi Dolphins
- 2005–2007: Karachi Zebras
- 2005–2008: Karachi Urban
- 2006–2009: Sind
- 2007–present: Pakistan International Airlines
- 2017: Karachi Kings
- 2019–2022: Sindh (squad no. 42)
- 2020: Quetta Gladiators (squad no. 42)

Career statistics
Competition	Test	ODI	FC	LA
Matches	16	7	172	145
Runs scored	817	236	10,708	6,974
Batting average	28.17	33.71	38.24	53.64
100s/50s	1/7	0/3	28/50	24/34
Top score	146	83	250	190*
Balls bowled	–	–	758	441
Wickets	–	–	5	7
Bowling average	–	–	69.40	51.42
5 wickets in innings	–	–	0	0
10 wickets in match	–	–	0	0
Best bowling	–	–	1/14	2/8
Catches/stumpings	8/–	3/–	135/–	61/–
- Source: CricInfo, 19 January 2020

Khurram Manzoor (Urdu: خرم منظور, born 10 June 1986) is a Pakistani international cricketer. He is a right-hand opening batsman who also bowls off-spin. He made his first-class cricket debut in the 2003–04 season, before representing Pakistan for the first time in the 5th One Day International (ODI) against Zimbabwe in Sheikhupura in February 2007. In total, Manzoor has played seven Tests and scored three half centuries. He performed well in two Tests for Pakistan A against West Indies A and scored 3 centuries. Subsequently, he was included in Pakistan's Test squad for the series against New Zealand.

He has also played for Cyclones of Chittagong in Bangladesh's NCL T20 Bangladesh. Khurram Manzoor hit his maiden Test century against South Africa in Abu Dhabi, in the UAE.

He made his Twenty20 International debut for Pakistan against India in the 2016 Asia Cup on 27 February 2016.

In January 2017, his total of 395 runs was the highest aggregate scored by a batsman in the 2016–17 Regional One Day Cup. He was also the leading run-scorer for Sindh in the 2017 Pakistan Cup, with 227 runs in four matches.

In April 2018, he was named in Khyber Pakhtunkhwa's squad for the 2018 Pakistan Cup. On 28 April 2018, in the match against Punjab, he scored 190 not out, his highest total in List A cricket. In Khyber Pakhtunkhwa's next match of the tournament, he scored 111 runs. He finished the tournament as the leading run-scorer, with 393 runs in four matches. He was also the leading run-scorer in the 2018–19 Quaid-e-Azam Trophy, with 886 runs in eight matches.

In March 2019, he was named in Punjab's squad for the 2019 Pakistan Cup. In the final group stage match of the tournament, he scored 168 runs from 116 balls, the highest individual total in the tournament.

In September 2019, he was named in Sindh's squad for the 2019–20 Quaid-e-Azam Trophy tournament.
