= Danish Aziz =

Pakistani cricketer

Personal information
- Born: 20 November 1995 (age 30); Karachi, Sindh, Pakistan
- Height: 6 ft (183 cm)
- Batting: Left-handed
- Bowling: Slow left-arm orthodox
- Role: All-rounder

International information
- National side: Pakistan (2021)
- ODI debut (cap 229): 2 April 2021 v South Africa
- Last ODI: 4 April 2021 v South Africa
- T20I debut (cap 91): 21 April 2021 v Zimbabwe
- Last T20I: 23 April 2021 v Zimbabwe

Domestic team information
- Years: Team
- 2014: Karachi Dolphins
- 2017, 2023/24—present: Karachi Whites (squad no. 64)
- 2018, 2021: Karachi Kings
- 2018/19–2022: Sindh
- 2019: 2025: Quetta Gladiators
- 2022: Islamabad United (squad no. 22)

Career statistics
Competition	ODI	T20I
Matches	2	2
Runs scored	12	37
Batting average	6.00	18.50
100s/50s	0/0	0/0
Top score	9	22
Balls bowled	30	18
Wickets	0	2
Bowling average	–	14.50
5 wickets in innings	–	0
10 wickets in match	–	0
Best bowling	–	2/29
Catches/stumpings	0/–	0/–
- Source: Cricinfo, 23 April 2021

Danish Aziz (born 20 November 1995) is a Pakistani cricketer. He made his international debut for the Pakistan cricket team in April 2021.

== Early life ==
Born in Karachi into a Memon family, his father and siblings supported his interest in cricket, his older brother Maroof Aziz having played some first-class cricket as well, and he pursued a Masters of Health and Physical Education program at Karachi University.

== Domestic career ==
He made his Pakistan Super League debut for Karachi Kings on 21 March 2018. He made his first-class debut on 12 December 2014 for Karachi Dolphins. He made his List A debut on 8 January 2017 for Karachi Whites in the 2016–17 Regional One Day Cup. He has also represented the Pakistan national under-19 cricket team.

In 2018, he scored an unbeaten knock of 86, in a massive partnership of 192 runs with Fawad Alam, to help Karachi Whites win the final against Islamabad and clinch the National One-day Regional Cup. In April 2018, he was named in Sindh's squad for the 2018 Pakistan Cup.

In December 2021, he was signed by Islamabad United following the players' draft for the 2022 Pakistan Super League.

== International career ==
In November 2020, he was named in Pakistan's 35-man squad for their tour to New Zealand. In January 2021, he was named in Pakistan's Twenty20 International (T20I) squad for their series against South Africa. In March 2021, he was named in Pakistan's limited overs squads for their tours to South Africa and Zimbabwe. He made his One Day International (ODI) debut against South Africa, on 2 April 2021. He made his T20I debut on 21 April 2021, against Zimbabwe.
