= Haris Sohail =

Pakistani cricketer

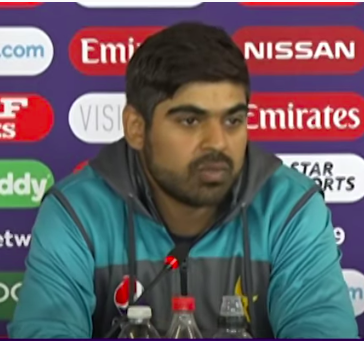

Personal information
- Born: 9 January 1989 (age 37); Sialkot, Punjab, Pakistan
- Nickname: Harry
- Height: 5 ft 11 in (180 cm)
- Batting: Left-handed
- Bowling: Slow left-arm orthodox
- Role: Middle-order batter

International information
- National side: Pakistan (2013–2021)
- Test debut (cap 229): 28 September 2017 v Sri Lanka
- Last Test: 3 January 2021 v New Zealand
- ODI debut (cap 192): 19 July 2013 v West Indies
- Last ODI: 13 January 2023 v New Zealand
- ODI shirt no.: 89
- T20I debut (cap 54): 28 July 2013 v West Indies
- Last T20I: 8 November 2019 v Australia

Domestic team information
- Years: Team
- 2008: ZTBL
- 2007: Sialkot cricket team
- 2007–2015: Sialkot Stallions
- 2013: Khulna Royal Bengals
- 2017–2018: Peshawar Zalmi
- 2019: Lahore Qalandars
- 2019–2023: Balochistan

Career statistics
Competition	Test	ODI	T20I	FC
Matches	16	42	14	81
Runs scored	847	1,685	210	5,056
Batting average	32.57	46.80	19.09	45.96
100s/50s	2/3	2/14	0/2	13/29
Top score	147	130	52	211*
Balls bowled	630	642	–	984
Wickets	13	11	–	15
Bowling average	22.61	55.72	–	33.26
5 wickets in innings	0	0	–	0
10 wickets in match	0	0	–	0
Best bowling	3/1	3/45	–	3/1
Catches/stumpings	14/–	17/–	3/–	45/–
- Source: ESPNCricinfo, 15 January 2023

Haris Sohail (Punjabi/Urdu: حارث سہیل; born 9 January 1989) is a Pakistani cricketer who plays as a left-handed batsman and who occasionally bowls left-arm orthodox.

He made his international debut for the Pakistan cricket team in July 2013.

In August 2018, he was one of thirty-three players to be awarded a central contract for the 2018–19 season by the Pakistan Cricket Board (PCB).

== Personal life ==
Haris was born into a Punjabi Gujjar family in Sialkot, in Punjab, Pakistan.

== Domestic career ==
He has represented Sialkot Stallions, Zarai Taraqiati Bank Limited cricket team and the Sialkot cricket team.

In the Pakistan Super League he has represented Peshawar Zalmi and Lahore Qalandars.

== International career ==
In 2012, Haris was selected in the Pakistan squad for their Twenty20 International (T20I) series in Sri Lanka. He was called up to the Pakistan Test side for their 2013 tour to South Africa. He made his One Day International (ODI) debut for Pakistan on 19 July 2013.

Sohail scored 85 not out as he won the player of the match award in 1st ODI against New Zealand in 2014. In the 2nd match, he scored 33 runs and took 3 wickets. He followed it by scoring a quick 39 off 28 and taking his ODI career best bowling figures of 3/45 as Pakistan won by 147 runs. In the last two games, he scored 13 and 65, respectively. He finished the 5-match ODI series as Pakistan's top scorer with 235 runs as well as taking 6 wickets.

In September 2017, he was named in Pakistan's Test squad for their series against Sri Lanka. He made his Test debut for Pakistan in the first Test against Sri Lanka on 28 September 2017.

In October 2018, Sohail scored his first century in Test cricket, making 110 against Australia in the United Arab Emirates. In March 2019, Sohail scored his first century in ODI cricket, making unbeaten 101 against Australia in the United Arab Emirates.

In April 2019, he was named in Pakistan's squad for the 2019 Cricket World Cup. He was man of the match, in his 2nd game of the tournament, against South Africa for his 89 off 59.

In September 2019, Sohail was named as the captain of Balochistan for the 2019–20 Quaid-e-Azam Trophy tournament.
