= Saif Badar =

Pakistani cricketer (born 1998)

Personal information
- Born: 3 July 1998 (age 28); Sialkot, Punjab, Pakistan
- Batting: Right-handed
- Bowling: Right-arm legbreak googly
- Role: Batsman

Domestic team information
- Years: Team
- 2017: Lahore Qalandars
- 2018: Multan Sultans
- 2019–2021: Southern Punjab
- 2020: Islamabad United
- 2021: Central Punjab
- 2023-present: Los Angeles Knight Riders
- Source: Cricinfo, 28 February 2020

Saif Badar (born 3 July 1998) is a Pakistani-born cricketer who plays in the Major League Cricket.

== Career ==
Saif made his List A debut on 19 April 2016 for Punjab in the 2016 Pakistan Cup. He made his first-class debut for Khan Research Laboratories in the 2017–18 Quaid-e-Azam Trophy on 26 September 2017. He made his Twenty20 debut for Peshawar in the 2017–18 National T20 Cup on 18 November 2017.

In September 2019, he was named in Southern Punjab's squad for the 2019–20 Quaid-e-Azam Trophy tournament. In November 2019, he was named in Pakistan's squad for the 2019 ACC Emerging Teams Asia Cup in Bangladesh. In the semi-final of that tournament, where Pakistan knocked India out of the competition, Badar was declared the man of the match for his all-round performance, scoring 47 not out and claiming 2 wickets for 57 runs.
