= 2022–23 Quaid-e-Azam Trophy =

Cricket tournament

- Dates: 27 September – 30 November 2022
- Administrator(s): Pakistan Cricket Board
- Cricket format: First-class
- Tournament format(s): Double round-robin and Final
- Host(s): Pakistan
- Champions: Northern (1st title)
- Participants: 6
- Matches: 31
- Player of the series: Mubasir Khan (Northern)
- Most runs: Mohammad Huraira (1,024)
- Most wickets: Abrar Ahmed (43)

The 2022–23 Quaid-e-Azam Trophy was a first-class domestic cricket competition that took place in Pakistan from 27 September to 30 November 2022. In September 2022, the Pakistan Cricket Board (PCB) confirmed the fixtures for the tournament. Khyber Pakhtunkhwa were the defending champions but did not qualify for the final.

The final of the tournament was played from 26 to 30 November and Northern won their first title.

== Squads ==
On 26 September 2022, the PCB confirmed all the squads for the tournament.

Balochistan	Central Punjab	Khyber Pakhtunkhwa	Northern	Sindh	Southern Punjab
Yasir Shah (c); Azeem Ghumman; Haris Sohail; Abdul Bangalzai; Akif Javed; Ali Waqas; Amad Butt; Imam-ul-Haq; Imran Butt; Asad Shafiq; Akbar-ur-Rehman; Ayaz Tasawwar; Haseebullah Khan (wk); Hussain Talat; Imran Butt; Kashif Bhatti; Khurram Shahzad; Taj Wali	Azhar Ali (c); Aamer Yamin; Abdullah Shafique; Abid Ali; Ahmed Daniyal; Ahmed Shehzad; Ali Shan (wk); Hunain Shah; Mohammad Ali; Mohammad Saad; Qasim Akram; Tayyab Tahir; Umaid Asif; Usama Mir; Waqas Maqsood	Khalid Usman (c); Ashfaq Ahmed; Adil Amin; Arshad Iqbal; Arshad Ullah; Ihsanullah; Imran Khan; Irfanullah Shah; Kamran Ghulam; Mohammad Sarwar Afridi; Nabi Gul; Rehan Afridi (wk); Sahibzada Farhan; Sajid Khan; Waqar Ahmed; Maaz Sadaqat	Umar Amin (c); Abdul Faseeh; Athar Mahmood; Faizan Riaz; Kashif Ali; Mehran Mumtaz; Mubasir Khan; Mohammad Huraira; Muhammad Musa; Nauman Ali; Rohail Nazir (wk); Sarmad Bhatti; Umar Waheed; Waqas Ahmed; Zeeshan Malik	Saud Shakeel (c); Abrar Ahmed; Asif Mehmood; Fawad Alam; Ghulam Mudassar; Khurram Manzoor; Mir Hamza; Mohammad Asghar; Mohammad Umar; Omair Yousuf; Saad Khan; Saim Ayub; Sarfaraz Ahmed (wk); Faraz Ali; Zahid Mahmood	Hasan Ali (c); Ahmed Bashir; Ali Usman; Hassan Khan; Imran Rafiq; Maqbool Ahmed (wk); Mohammad Ilyas; Mohammad Imran; Agha Salman; Sameen Gul; Sharoon Siraj; Umar Siddiq; Usman Salahuddin; Yousaf Babar; Zain Abbas

== Venues ==
Lahore	Abbottabad	Rawalpindi	Rawalpindi
Gaddafi Stadium	Abbottabad Cricket Stadium	Rawalpindi Cricket Stadium	Shoaib Akhtar Stadium
Capacity: 27,000	Capacity: 4,000	Capacity: 17,000	Capacity: 8,000
Matches: 2	Matches: 9	Matches: 8	Matches: 1
2022–23 Quaid-e-Azam Trophy is located in Pakistan
Faisalabad	Lahore	Karachi	Multan
Iqbal Stadium	LCCA Ground	National Bank Cricket Arena	Multan Cricket Stadium
Capacity: 18,000	Capacity: 5,000	Capacity: 35,000	Capacity: 35,000
Matches: 4	Matches: 4	Matches: 1	Matches: 2

== Points table ==
Team	Pld	W	L	D	T	NR	Pts	NRR
Northern	10	3	1	6	0	0	135	-0.165
Sindh	10	3	0	6	0	1	128	0.135
Central Punjab	10	0	0	10	0	0	124	0.133
Balochistan	10	2	2	6	0	0	114	-0.169
Southern Punjab	10	0	2	7	0	1	91	0.103
Khyber Pakhtunkhwa	10	1	4	3	0	2	80	-0.022

- The top 2 teams qualified for the Final

== Fixtures ==
=== Round 1 ===
27–30 September 2022
Scorecard

Balochistan	v	Khyber Pakhtunkhwa (H)
473 (123 overs); Azeem Ghumman 78 (144); Arshad Iqbal 4/114 (28 overs)		291 (85.5 overs); Kamran Ghulam 102 (171); Khurram Shahzad 4/67 (21 overs)
107/4 (38 overs); Hussain Talat 55 (80); Arshad Iqbal 2/33 (14 overs)		235 (68.5 overs); Sahibzada Farhan 63 (67); Khurram Shahzad 3/61 (17 overs)

Balochistan won by 134 runs.
Abbottabad Cricket Stadium, Abbottabad
Umpires: Ghaffar Kazmi and Saqib Khan

- Khyber Pakhtunkhwa won the toss and elected to field.
- Haseebullah Khan (Balochistan) and Ihsanullah (Khyber Pakhtunkhwa) both made their first-class debuts.
- Points: Balochistan 24, Khyber Pakhtunkhwa 5

27–30 September 2022
Scorecard

Central Punjab (H)	v	Sindh
428 (102.2 overs); Abdullah Shafique 232 (263); Mir Hamza 3/72 (24 overs)		368 (85.5 overs); Fawad Alam 127* (298); Mohammad Ali 4/84 (20 overs)
277/9d (90.4 overs); Tayyab Tahir 152* (252); Asif Mahmood 4/59 (18.4 overs)		132/4 (44 overs); Khurram Manzoor 50* (88); Qasim Akram 1/8 (4 overs)

Match drawn
Rawalpindi Cricket Stadium, Rawalpindi
Umpires: Imran Javed and Mohammad Sajid

- Sindh won the toss and elected to field.
- Asif Mahmood (Sindh) and Saim Ayub (Sindh) both made their first-class debuts.
- Points: Central Punjab 13, Sindh 12

27–30 September 2022
Scorecard

Northern	v	Southern Punjab (H)
529/5d (133 overs); Mubasir Khan 170 (236); Hassan Khan 3/94 (26 overs)		269 (86.2 overs); Zain Abbas 120 (371); Nauman Ali 4/73 (20.2 overs)
8/0 (1.8 overs); Mohammad Huraira 4* (3)		143/2 (45 overs) (f/o); Imran Rafiq 90 (228); Musa Khan 3/39 (12 overs)

Northern won by 10 wickets.
Iqbal Stadium, Faisalabad
Umpires: Shozab Raza and Waheed Yaqoob

- Northern won the toss and elected to bat.
- Points: Northern 25, Southern Punjab (Pakistan) 3

=== Round 2 ===
3–6 October 2022
Scorecard

Balochistan	v	Central Punjab
185 (47.2 overs); Hussain Talat 43 (65); Ahmed Daniyal 3/41 (9 overs)		535/6d (143.3 overs); Tayyab Tahir 137 (244); Hussain Talat 2/75 (22 overs)
303/6 (118 overs); Imam-ul-Haq 108 (231); Ahmed Daniyal 3/73 (23 overs)

Match drawn
Rawalpindi Cricket Stadium, Rawalpindi
Umpires: Imran Javed and Mohammad Sajid

- Central Punjab won the toss and elected to field.
- Ahmed Daniyal (Central Punjab) made his first-class debut.
- Points: Balochistan 6, Central Punjab 15

3–6 October 2022
Scorecard

Northern	v	Sindh
417 (143.3 overs); Faizan Riaz 119 (279); Zahid Mahmood 4/138 (48 overs)		457/8d (138.5 overs); Saud Shakeel 158* (319); Mubasir Khan 4/140 (43.5 overs)
		160/4 (56 overs); Saad Khan 72 (116); Mubasir Khan 2/57 (21 overs)

Match drawn
Iqbal Stadium, Faisalabad
Umpires: Nasir Hussain and Shozab Raza

- Sindh won the toss and elected to bat.
- Points: Sindh 9, Northern 8

3–6 October 2022
Scorecard

Khyber Pakhtunkhwa	v	Southern Punjab
240 (69.2 overs); Waqar Ahmed 134* (218); Mohammad Ilyas 4/ 76 (15.2 overs)		308 (91.2overs); Umar Siddiq 112 (199); Ihsanullah 3/45 (18 overs)
334 (108.5 overs); Kamran Ghulam 86 (175); Hasan Ali 4/82 (25 over)		101/2 (44 overs); Zain Abbas 32 (51) [[Arshad Iqbal]] 1/9 (7 overs)

Match Drawn
Abbottabad Cricket Stadium, Abbottabad
Umpires: Ghaffar Kazmi and Mohammad Asif

- Arshadullah (Khyber Pakhtunkhwa) made his first-class debut.
- Points: Khyber Pakhtunkhwa 9, Southern Punjab 13

=== Round 3 ===
9–12 October 2022
Scorecard

Northern	v	Balochistan
520/8d (116 overs); Faizan Riaz 201 (216); Taj Wali 5/91 (23 overs)		216 (81.1 overs); Asad Shafiq 53 (83); Mubasir Khan 3/18 (7.1 overs)
34/0 (7.1 overs); Mohammad Huraira 26* (24)		336 (90 overs) (f/o); Hussain Talat 115* (178); Mubasir Khan 3/50 (19 overs)

Northern won by 10 wickets
Abbottabad Cricket Stadium, Abbottabad
Umpires: Ahmed Shahab and Faisal Afridi

- Balochistan won the toss and elected to field.
- Points: Northern (Pakistan) 26, Balochistan 2

9–12 October 2022
Scorecard

Southern Punjab	v	Sindh
278 (94.3 overs); Usman Salahuddin 89 (214); Abrar Ahmed 5/94 (37.3 overs)		181 (50.2 overs); Mohammad Umar 59 (57); Mohammad Ilyas 5/50 (15 overs)
283 (85.5 overs); Zain Abbas 138 (195); Abrar Ahmed 6/100 (31.5 overs)		326/7 (103 overs); Omair Yousuf 110* (192); Mohammad Abbas 3/55 (20 overs)

Match drawn
Rawalpindi Cricket Stadium, Rawalpindi
Umpires: Asif Yaqoob and Khalid Mahmood

- Sindh won the toss and elected to field.
- Sharoon Siraj (Southern Punjab) made his first-class debut.
- Points: Southern Punjab 13, Sindh 9

9–12 October 2022
Scorecard

Central Punjab	v	Khyber Pakhtunkhwa
274 (100.3 overs); Abid Ali 66 (101); Khalid Usman 6/86 (24 overs)		220 (77.4 overs); Waqar Ahmed 58 (85); Usama Mir 6/91 (28.4 overs)
		174/3 (39 overs); Sahibzada Farhan 100* (121); Mohammad Ali 2/32 (10 overs)

Match drawn
Iqbal Stadium, Faisalabad
Umpires: Rashid Riaz and Shozab Raza

- Khyber Pakhtunkhwa won the toss and elected to bat.
- Khyber Pakhtunkhwa 10, Central Punjab 12

=== Round 4 ===
15–18 October 2022
Scorecard

Balochistan	v	Southern Punjab
346 (127 overs); Asad Shafiq 106 (183); Sameen Gul 5/84 (30 overs)		330 (96.5 overs); Usman Salahuddin 88 (184); Najeebullah 5/90 (23.5 overs)
295/6 (89 overs); Haris Sohail 133* (188); Mohammad Imran 2/43 (13 overs)

Match drawn
Abbottabad Cricket Stadium, Abbottabad
Umpires: Ahmed Shahab and Saqib Khan

- Southern Punjab won the toss and elected to field.
- Points: Balochistan 10, Southern Punjab 9

15–18 October 2022
Scorecard

Khyber Pakhtunkhwa	v	Sindh
384 (115.2 overs); Mohammad Sarwar 148 (201); Abrar Ahmed 4/130 (39.2)		490 (138 overs); Khurram Manzoor 116 (130); Ihsanullah 3/109 (25 overs)
108 (46.2 overs); Ashfaq Ahmed 37 (86); Abrar Ahmed 5/29 (19)		4/0 (0.3 overs); Khurram Manzoor 4* (3)

Sindh won by 10 wickets
Rawalpindi Cricket Stadium, Rawalpindi
Umpires: Khalid Mahmood and Nasir Hussain

- Sindh won the toss and elected to field.
- Points: Sindh 21, Khyber Pakhtunkhwa 4

15–18 October 2022
Scorecard

Central Punjab	v	Northern
509/9d (140 overs); Azhar Ali 219 (323); Mehran Mumtaz 3/111 (38 overs)		651/9 (197.1 overs); Sarmad Bhatti 140 (345); Ahmed Safi Abdullah 6/132 (50 overs)

Match drawn
Iqbal Stadium, Faisalabad
Umpires: Tariq Rasheed and Waleed Yaqub

- Central Punjab won the toss and elected to bat.
- Points: Central Punjab 10, Northern 9

=== Round 5 ===
21–24 October 2022
Scorecard

Balochistan	v	Sindh
269 (90.5); Haseebullah Khan 67 (139); Ghulam Mudassar 5/73 (20.5 overs)		390 (123 overs); Saud Shakeel 187* (387); Asad Shafiq 2/37 (17 overs)
190 (64.3 overs); Kashif Bhatti 37 (58); Abrar Ahmed 5/49 (23.3 overs)		74/0 (10.3 overs); Saim Ayub 48* (33)

Sindh won by 10 wickets
Rawalpindi Cricket Stadium, Rawalpindi
Umpires: Imran Javed and Mohammad Sajid

- Sindh won the toss and elected to field.
- Points: Sindh 23, Balochistan 5

21–24 October 2022
Scorecard

Central Punjab	v	Southern Punjab
302 (92.5 overs); Faheem Ashraf 87 (131); Sameen Gul 4/67 (20.5 overs)		200 (50 overs); Mohammad Imran 71 (112); Mohammad Ali 6/59 (18 overs)
274/3d (57 overs); Abdullah Shafique 114* 168; Mohammad Ilyas 1/31 (12 overs)		330/8 (103 overs); Agha Salman 103 (169); Mohammad Ali 5/71 (31 overs)

Match drawn
Iqbal Stadium, Faisalabad
Umpires: Nasir Hussain and Tariq Rasheed

- Southern Punjab won the toss and elected to field.
- Hunain Shah (Central Punjab) and Mohammad Sadaqat (Southern Punjab) both made their first-class debuts.
- Points: Central Punjab 14, Southern Punjab 11

21–24 October 2022
Scorecard

Khyber Pakhtunkhwa	v	Northern
175 (38.5 overs); Waqar Ahmed 35 (42); Aamer Jamal 5/38 (8.5 overs)		249 (61.2 overs); Sarmad Bhatti 114 (118); Ihsanullah 5/70 (14 overs)
121 (37 overs); Rehan Afridi 29 (30); Athar Mahmood 6/40 (14 overs)		48/1 (20.1 overs); Mohammad Huraira 23 (34)

Northern won by 9 wickets
Abbottabad Cricket Stadium, Abbottabad
Umpires: Saqib Khan and Waleed Yaqub

- Northern won the toss and elected to field.
- Points: Northern 23, Khyber Pakhtunkhwa 5

=== Round 6 ===
27–30 October 2022
Scorecard

Khyber Pakhtunkhwa	v	Balochistan
215 (64.1 overs); Sajid Khan 68 (116); Yasir Shah 5/57 (18.1 overs)		487/7d (142.3 overs); Hussain Talat 112 (195); Sajid Khan 2/155 (52 overs)
324 (106.1 overs) (f/o); Kamran Ghulam 92 (146); Yasir Shah 5/105 (30 overs)		53/3 (4.2 overs); Haseebullah Khan 23 (16); Ihsanullah 2/35 (202)

Balochistan won by 7 wickets
Multan Cricket Stadium, Multan
Umpires: Shozab Raza and Mohammad Asif

- Khyber Pakhtunkhwa won the toss and elected to field.
- Maaz Sadaqat (Khyber Pakhtunkhwa) made his first-class debut.
- Points: Balochistan 24, Khyber Pakhtunkhwa 2

27–30 October 2022
Scorecard

Sindh	v	Central Punjab
188 (56 overs); Saad Khan 29 (68); Aamer Yamin 5/54 (16 overs)		305 (95.5 overs); Aamer Yamin 63 (49); Abrar Ahmed 4/82 (28 overs)
419 (113.3 overs); Saad Khan 161 (262); Aamer Yamin 4/73 (25 overs)		90/2 (37 overs); Abid Ali 42 (99); Mir Hamza 1/9 (5 overs)

Match drawn
Rawalpindi Cricket Stadium, Rawalpindi
Umpires: Aaley Haider and Imran Javed

- Central Punjab won the toss and elected to field.
- Points: Sindh 8, Central Punjab 14

27–30 October 2022
Scorecard

Southern Punjab	v	Northern
566/7d (122 overs); Usman Salahuddin 126 (252); Kashif Ali 2/110 (28 overs)		388 (117 overs); Rohail Nazir 149 (297); Mohammad Abbas 5/95 (29 overs)
261/7 (58.4 overs); Usman Salahuddin 100* (154); Mubasir Khan 5/115 (19.5 overs)

Match drawn
Abbottabad Cricket Stadium, Abbottabad
Umpires: Saqib Khan and Tariq Rasheed

- Northern won the toss and elected to field.
- Points: Southern Punjab 11, Northern 10

=== Round 7 ===
2–5 November 2022
Scorecard

Northern	v	Balochistan
259 (85.2 overs); Umar Amin 130 (226); Bilawal Iqbal 5/49 (23.2 overs)		375 (89.3 overs); Asad Shafiq 131 (224); Aamer Jamal 8/120 (30 overs)
68/1 (26 overs); Abdul Faseeh 38 (82); Yasir Shah 1/14 (4 overs)

Match drawn
Abbottabad Cricket Stadium, Abbottabad
Umpires: Ghaffar Kazmi and Mohammad Asif

- Northern won the toss and elected to bat first.
- No play was possible on Day 4 due to rain.
- Points: Northern 10, Balochistan 13

2–5 November 2022
Scorecard

Sindh	v	Southern Punjab
210 (69.1 overs); Sarfaraz Ahmed 56 (62); Mohammad Abbas 5/50 (18.1 overs)		202 (59.5 overs); Sharoon Siraj 35 (76); Abrar Ahmed 6/61 (19.5 overs)
337 (107.2 overs); Khurram Manzoor 121 (273); Mohammad Ilyas 3/57 (17 overs)		143 (40.3 overs); Usman Salahuddin 47 (67); Mohammad Umar 3/41 (12 overs)

Sindh won by 202 runs
Rawalpindi Cricket Stadium, Rawalpindi
Umpires: Aaley Haider and Tariq Rasheed

- Southern Punjab won the toss and elected to field.
- Points: Sindh 22, Southern Punjab 6

2–5 November 2022
Scorecard

Khyber Pakhtunkhwa	v	Central Punjab
436 (126.3 overs); Israrullah 124 (211); Usama Mir 3/98 (38 overs)		471 (128.2 overs); Abid Ali 159 (287); Khalid Usman 4/185 (38 overs)
120/1 (27 overs); Waqar Ahmed 60* (80); Aamer Yamin 1/9 (5 overs)

Match drawn
Lahore City Cricket Association Ground, Lahore
Umpires: Imtiaz Iqbal and Mohammad Sajid

- Central Punjab won the toss and elected to field.
- Mohammad Imran (Khyber Pakhtunkhwa) made his first-class debut.
- Points: Khyber Pakhtunkhwa 10, Central Punjab 12

=== Round 8 ===
8–11 November 2022
Scorecard

Southern Punjab	v	Balochistan
350 (89.4 overs); Usman Salahuddin 135 (256); Hussain Talat 6/70 (16 overs)		213/4 (50 overs); Abdul Bangalzai 97 (130); Mohammad Ilyas 2/43 (12 overs)

Match drawn
Abbottabad Cricket Stadium, Abbottabad
Umpires: Ghaffar Kazmi and Mohammad Asif

- Balochistan won the toss and elected to field.
- No play was possible after 0.2 overs on Day 1 and Day 2 due to rain.
- Points: Southern Punjab 10, Balochistan 9

9–12 November 2022
Scorecard

Sindh	v	Khyber Pakhtunkhwa

Match abandoned without a ball bowled
Rawalpindi Cricket Stadium, Rawalpindi

- No toss
- No play was possible due to the attempted assassination of Imran Khan and subsequent blocking of Rawalpindi-Islamabad highway by his followers
- Points: Sindh 5, Khyber Pakhtunkhwa 5

8–11 November 2022
Scorecard

Northern	v	Central Punjab
333 (96.2 overs); Mohammad Huraira 114 (179); Zafar Gohar 6/96 (31.2 overs)		385 (94 overs); Abdullah Shafique 155 (220); Musa Khan 4/100 (20 overs)
166/5 (58.2 overs); Mubasir Khan 58* (98); Qasim Akram 1/8 (2 overs)		210/7d (42 overs); Tayyab Tahir 100 (113); Aamer Jamal 3/60 (12 overs)

Match drawn
Lahore City Cricket Association Ground, Lahore
Umpires: Imtiaz Iqbal and Mohammad Sajid

- Central Punjab won the toss and elected to bat.
- Points: Central Punjab 12, Northern 11

=== Round 9 ===
14–17 November 2022
Scorecard

Central Punjab	v	Balochistan
349 (96.5 overs); Qasim Akram 111 (162); Akif Javed 4/97 (23 overs)		318 (99.3 overs); Imran Butt 80 (147); Zafar Gohar 5/94 (32.3 overs)
126/1 (49 overs); Mohammad Saad 57* (143); Kashif Bhatti 1/40 (18 overs)

Match drawn
Lahore City Cricket Association Ground, Lahore
Umpires: Ghaffar Kazmi and Imtiaz Iqbal

- Balochistan won the toss and elected to field.
- No play was possible on Day 3 due to rain.
- Points: Central Punjab 11, Balochistan 11

14–17 November 2022
Scorecard

Sindh	v	Northern
476 (144.4 overs); Omair Yousuf 150* (293); Nauman Ali 5/130 (40.4 overs)		605/8d (154.5 overs); Mohammad Huraira 173 (293); Zahid Mahmood 4/185 (45.4 overs)
		101/1 (26 overs); Mohammad Huraira 58* (66); Zahid Mahmood 1/28 (10 overs)

Match drawn
National Bank Cricket Arena, Karachi
Umpires: Mohammad Asif and Nasir Hussain

- Northern won the toss and elected to bat.
- Points: Northern 10, Sindh 9

14–17 November 2022
Scorecard

Southern Punjab	v	Khyber Pakhtunkhwa

Match abandoned without a ball bowled
Abbottabad Cricket Stadium, Abbottabad
Umpires: Aaley Haider and Mohammad Sajid

- No toss
- No play was possible due to rain.
- Points: Southern Punjab 5, Khyber Pakhtunkhwa 5

=== Round 10 ===
20–23 November 2022
Scorecard

Sindh	v	Balochistan
644/6d (165.1 overs); Saud Shakeel 181 (259); Kashif Bhatti 3/142 (51 overs)		485 (132.5 overs); Imran Butt 195 (314); Kashif Bhatti 3/142 (51 overs)
		31/1 (4 overs) (f/o); Kashif Bhatti 22* (9); Saim Ayub 1/18 (2 overs)

Match Drawn
Lahore City Cricket Association Ground, Lahore
Umpires: Ghaffar Kazmi and Imtiaz Iqbal

- Sindh won the toss and elected to bat.
- Aaliyan Mehmood (Sindh) and Arish Ali Khan (Sindh) both made their first-class debuts.
- Substitute: Aaliyan Mehmood for Abrar Ahmed (Sindh 1st innings, 155.1 over)
- Substitute: Arish Ali Khan for Zahid Mahmood (Sindh 1st innings, 155.1 over)
- Substitute: Danish Aziz for Saud Shakeel (Sindh 1st innings, 155.1 over)
- Substitute: Mohammad Hasan for Sarfaraz Ahmed (Sindh 1st innings, 155.1 over)
- Points: Sindh 10, Balochistan 10

20–23 November 2022
Scorecard

Southern Punjab	v	Central Punjab
550/8d (126 overs); Agha Salman 158* (168); Qasim Akram 3/43 (14 overs)		490 (119.2 overs); Mohammad Saad 182 (281); Hasan Ali 3/108 (28 overs)
216/2 (55 overs); Usman Salahuddin 100* (134); Umaid Asif 1/16 (6 overs)

Match Drawn
Gaddafi Stadium, Lahore
Umpires: Rashid Riaz and Waleed Yaqub

- Central Punjab won the toss and elected to field.
- Points: Southern Punjab 10, Central Punjab 11

20–23 November 2022
Scorecard

Northern	v	Khyber Pakhtunkhwa
223 (72.2 overs); Rohail Nazir 82 (158); Ihsanullah 4/41 (14.2 overs)		444 (132.4 overs); Maaz Sadaqat 91 (236); Kashif Ali 3/90 (29 overs)
171 (73.5 overs); Rohail Nazir 62 (158); Sajid Khan 5/50 (20.5 overs)

Khyber Pakhtunkhwa won by an innings and 50 runs
Shoaib Akhtar Stadium, Rawalpindi
Umpires: Asif Yaqoob and Faisal Afridi

- Khyber Pakhtunkhwa won the toss and elected to field.
- Muhammad Mohsin Khan (Khyber Pakhtunkhwa) made his first-class debut.
- Points: Khyber Pakhtunkhwa 25, Northern 3

== Final ==
26–30 November 2022
Scorecard

Sindh	v	Northern
284 (92.5 overs); Asif Mehmood 78 (111); Muhammad Musa 3/61 (19 overs)		593 (141 overs); Mohammad Huraira 221 (236); Aaliyan Mehmood 4/96 (26 overs)
254 (56.2 overs); Fawad Alam 113 (130); Muhammad Musa 3/49 (10.2 overs)

Northern won by an innings and 55 runs
Gaddafi Stadium, Lahore
Umpires: Faisal Afridi and Rashid Riaz
Player of the match: Mohammad Huraira (Northern)

- Northern won the toss and elected to field.
- Northern won the 2022-23 Quaid-e-Azam Trophy
