= 2021–22 Quaid-e-Azam Trophy =

Cricket tournament

- Dates: 20 October – 29 December 2021
- Administrator: Pakistan Cricket Board
- Cricket format: First-class
- Tournament format(s): Group stage and Final
- Host: Pakistan
- Champions: Khyber Pakhtunkhwa (2nd title)
- Participants: 6
- Matches: 31
- Player of the series: Mubasir Khan
- Most runs: Mohammad Huraira (986)
- Most wickets: Ali Usman (43)
- Official website: www.pcb.com.pk

The 2021–22 Quaid-e-Azam Trophy was a first-class domestic cricket competition that took place in Pakistan from 20 October to 29 December 2021. In September 2021, the Pakistan Cricket Board (PCB) confirmed the fixtures for the tournament, with the full schedule being announced the following month. Central Punjab and Khyber Pakhtunkhwa were the defending champions, after the final of the previous tournament finished in a tie.

All of the matches played in the first three rounds of the tournament finished as draws. On 7 November 2021, the PCB announced that the fourth round match between Central Punjab and Sindh would be played with the pink ball, along with the final of the tournament. The first result other than a draw came in the fourth round of the tournament, when Southern Punjab beat Northern by ten wickets. In the same round, Ahsan Ali became the ninth batsman to score a triple century in the Quaid-e-Azam Trophy, when he made 303 not out in Sindh's match against Central Punjab. All of the matches in round five of the competition also ended as draws. Conversely, only one match in rounds six and seven ended as a draw, with Sindh winning back-to-back matches to lead the table.

Ahead of the tenth and final round of matches, four teams were still in contention to reach the final. In the tenth round of fixtures, Mohammad Huraira of Northern scored his maiden triple century in first-class cricket. Following the completion of the group stage matches, Northern and Khyber Pakhtunkhwa finished first and second respectively to advance to the final of the tournament. Khyber Pakhtunkhwa won the tournament, beating Northern by 169 runs in the final.

== Squads ==
On 15 October 2021, the PCB confirmed all the squads for the tournament.

Balochistan	Central Punjab	Khyber Pakhtunkhwa	Northern	Sindh	Southern Punjab
Imran Butt (c); Abdul Bangalzai; Akbar-ur-Rehman; Amad Butt; Ayaz Tasawwar; Bismillah Khan (wk); Gohar Faiz; Haris Sohail; Imam-ul-Haq; Junaid Khan; Kashif Bhatti; Raza-ul-Hasan; Taj Wali; Umaid Asif; Yasir Shah	Azhar Ali (c); Abid Ali; Ahmed Bashir; Ahmed Shehzad; Bilal Asif; Bilawal Iqbal; Ehsan Adil; Faheem Ashraf; Hussain Talat; Junaid Ali (wk); Mohammad Saad; Muhammad Akhlaq (wk); Saad Nasim; Saif Badar; Waqas Maqsood; Zafar Gohar	Iftikhar Ahmed (c); Mohammad Amir Khan; Adil Amin; Ashfaq Ahmed; Asif Afridi; Imran Khan; Israrullah; Khalid Usman; Musadiq Ahmed; Nabi Gul; Niaz Khan; Rehan Afridi (wk); Sahibzada Farhan; Sajid Khan; Sameen Gul; Tahir Khan	Nauman Ali (c); Aamer Jamal; Aaqib Liaquat; Athar Mahmood; Faizan Riaz; Mohammad Huraira; Mubasir Khan; Munir Riaz; Muhammad Musa; Nasir Nawaz; Rohail Nazir (wk); Sarmad Bhatti; Umar Amin; Umar Waheed; Usman Shinwari; Waqas Ahmed	Fawad Alam (c); Asad Shafiq; Ashiq Ali; Hasan Mohsin; Khuzaima Bin Tanvir; Mir Hamza; Mohammad Asghar; Mohammad Hasan (wk); Mohammad Hasnain; Mohammad Suleman; Mohammad Taha; Saad Khan; Shan Masood; Sharjeel Khan; Sohail Khan; Tabish Khan	Mohammad Abbas (c); Aamer Yamin; Ali Usman; Azam Khan (wk); Hassan Khan; Imran Rafiq; Mohammad Ilyas; Mohammad Imran; Mohammad Junaid; Naved Yasin; Tayyab Tahir; Umar Siddiq (wk); Waqar Hussain (wk); Yousaf Babar; Zain Abbas; Zia-ul-Haq

== Points table ==
Team	Pld	W	L	D	T	Pts	NRR
Northern	10	4	2	4	0	152	0.152
Khyber Pakhtunkhwa	10	4	1	5	0	150	0.070
Sindh	10	4	1	5	0	143	0.172
Central Punjab	10	2	3	5	0	106	–0.264
Southern Punjab	10	1	4	5	0	100	0.056
Balochistan	10	0	4	6	0	80	–0.154

== Fixtures ==
=== Round 1 ===
20–23 October 2021
Scorecard

Balochistan	v	Sindh
402 (133 overs); Imran Butt 104 (222); Mir Hamza 2/32 (20 overs)		324 (137.4 overs); Khurram Manzoor 153 (296); Raza-ul-Hasan 5/132 (49 overs)
127/3 (59 overs); Imran Butt 59 (145); Mohammad Asghar 2/48 (15 overs)

Match drawn
Iqbal Stadium, Faisalabad
Umpires: Asif Yaqoob and Saqib Khan

- Balochistan won the toss and elected to bat.
- Abdul Bangalzai (Balochistan) made his first-class debut.

20–23 October 2021
Scorecard

Central Punjab	v	Southern Punjab
384 (115.3 overs); Abid Ali 158 (294); Ali Usman 4/99 (34.3 overs)		252/9d (89.5 overs); Tayyab Tahir 79 (232); Zafar Gohar 4/93 (32 overs)
212/4 (40.4 overs); Ahmed Shehzad 91* (112); Ali Usman 1/41 (12 overs)

Match drawn
Multan Cricket Stadium, Multan
Umpires: Aftab Gillani and Qaiser Waheed

- Toss uncontested, Southern Punjab elected to field.

20–23 October 2021
Scorecard

Khyber Pakhtunkhwa	v	Northern
337 (105.1 overs); Sahibzada Farhan 71 (134); Muhammad Musa 5/78 (22.1 overs)		511/8d (144.2 overs); Faizan Riaz 115 (262); Sajid Khan 3/88 (42.2 overs)
158/1 (40 overs); Sahibzada Farhan 79* (130); Mubasir Khan 1/30 (11 overs)

Match drawn
Gaddafi Stadium, Lahore
Umpires: Rashid Riaz and Shozab Raza

- Khyber Pakhtunkhwa won the toss and elected to bat.
- Mohammad Amir Khan (Khyber Pakhtunkhwa) and Mohammad Huraira (Northern) both made their first-class debuts.

=== Round 2 ===
27–30 October 2021
Scorecard

Sindh	v	Khyber Pakhtunkhwa
367 (110.1 overs); Saad Khan 129 (195); Niaz Khan 5/58 (19.1 overs)		503/7d (144.2 overs); Israrullah 160 (228); Fawad Alam 2/46 (12.2 overs)
180/5 (55 overs); Asad Shafiq 96 (116); Sameen Gul 2/32 (7 overs)

Match drawn
Iqbal Stadium, Faisalabad
Umpires: Nasir Hussain and Saqib Khan

- Sindh won the toss and elected to bat.
- Niaz Khan (Khyber Pakhtunkhwa) made his first-class debut.

27–30 October 2021
Scorecard

Southern Punjab	v	Balochistan
475/5d (98.5 overs); Tayyab Tahir 221 (274); Junaid Khan 2/87 (16.5 overs)		571/7d (178.1 overs); Bismillah Khan 116 (205); Mohammad Imran 2/102 (30 overs)
112/2 (32 overs); Tayyab Tahir 60* (104); Junaid Khan 1/1 (3 overs)

Match drawn
Multan Cricket Stadium, Multan
Umpires: Aftab Gillani and Qaiser Waheed

- Southern Punjab won the toss and elected to bat.
- Tayyab Tahir (Southern Punjab) scored his maiden century in first-class cricket.

27–30 October 2021
Scorecard

Northern	v	Central Punjab
455/9d (132.5 overs); Faizan Riaz 213 (346); Ehsan Adil 3/60 (20 overs)		367 (116.5 overs); Abid Ali 81 (175); Muhammad Musa 4/81 (30 overs)
239/2 (50.1 overs); Mohammad Huraira 107* (146); Ahmed Shehzad 1/32 (7 overs)

Match drawn
Gaddafi Stadium, Lahore
Umpires: Asif Yaqoob and Rashid Riaz

- Central Punjab won the toss and elected to field.

=== Round 3 ===
3–6 November 2021
Scorecard

Balochistan	v	Central Punjab
472/8d (131.5 overs); Abdul Bangalzai 203* (388); Ahmed Bashir 2/50 (19 overs)		604/4 (161.4 overs); Mohammad Saad 203* (309); Najeebullah 2/93 (26.4 overs)

Match drawn
Gaddafi Stadium, Lahore
Umpires: Shozab Raza and Waheed Yaqoob

- Balochistan won the toss and elected to bat.
- Najeebullah (Balochistan) made his first-class debut.

3–6 November 2021
Scorecard

Northern	v	Sindh
374 (108 overs); Mohammad Huraira 112 (166); Mir Hamza 4/65 (21 overs)		489 (148.3 overs); Mohammad Hasan 125 (172); Nauman Ali 5/141 (38 overs)
158/1 (48 overs); Nasir Nawaz 80* (134); Tabish Khan 1/14 (6 overs)

Match drawn
Multan Cricket Stadium, Multan
Umpires: Aftab Gillani and Qaiser Waheed

- Toss uncontested, Sindh elected to field.
- Mohammad Suleman (Sindh) made his first-class debut.
- Tabish Khan (Sindh) took his 600th first-class wicket.

3–6 November 2021
Scorecard

Southern Punjab	v	Khyber Pakhtunkhwa
453 (94.5 overs); Mohammad Imran 179 (195); Niaz Khan 3/62 (11.5 overs)		297 (88.3 overs); Nabi Gul 148* (255); Ali Usman 5/88 (30 overs)
42/0 (4 overs); Zia-ul-Haq 23* (14)		342 (113.3 overs) (f/o); Sahibzada Farhan 163 (322); Ali Usman 5/102 (38 overs)

Match drawn
Iqbal Stadium, Faisalabad
Umpires: Ghaffar Kazmi and Nasir Hussain

- Southern Punjab won the toss and elected to bat.
- Azam Khan (Southern Punjab) scored his maiden century in first-class cricket.

=== Round 4 ===
10–13 November 2021
Scorecard

Balochistan	v	Khyber Pakhtunkhwa
463/5d (137.5 overs); Imam-ul-Haq 202* (390); Asif Afridi 2/139 (34.5 overs)		557 (139.1 overs); Khalid Usman 110* (148); Raza-ul-Hasan 5/160 (39 overs)
58/0 (23 overs); Abdul Bangalzai 32* (69)

Match drawn
Iqbal Stadium, Faisalabad
Umpires: Ghaffar Kazmi and Nasir Hussain

- Balochistan won the toss and elected to bat.

10–13 November 2021 (D/N)
Scorecard

Central Punjab	v	Sindh
387/9d (129.3 overs); Abid Ali 122 (266); Mohammad Asghar 4/143 (52.3 overs)		616/5d (134 overs); Ahsan Ali 303* (385); Zafar Gohar 3/163 (50 overs)
185/4 (63 overs); Ahmed Shehzad 63 (112); Mohammad Asghar 3/83 (25 overs)

Match drawn
Gaddafi Stadium, Lahore
Umpires: Shozab Raza and Waleed Yaqub

- Toss uncontested, Sindh elected to field.

10–13 November 2021
Scorecard

Northern	v	Southern Punjab
163 (56.1 overs); Nasir Nawaz 58 (92); Ali Usman 3/39 (16.1 overs)		394 (97.4 overs); Yousuf Babar 138 (231); Aamer Jamal 5/111 (27.4 overs)
231 (79.4 overs); Faizan Riaz 51 (112); Ali Usman 4/50 (27.4 overs)		1/0 (5 overs); Ali Usman 1* (18)

Southern Punjab won by 10 wickets
Multan Cricket Stadium, Multan
Umpires: Qaiser Waheed and Zameer Haider

- Toss uncontested, Southern Punjab elected to field.

=== Round 5 ===
17–20 November 2021
Scorecard

Northern	v	Balochistan
244 (84.4 overs); Abdul Faseeh 47 (70); Kashif Bhatti 5/92 (30 overs)		211 (74.1 overs); Bismillah Khan 64 (78); Raza Hasan 4/67 (24.1 overs)
259/6d (76.4 overs); Abdul Faseeh 94 (192); Taj Wali 5/47 (16.4 overs)		278/9 (85 overs); Ayaz Tasawwar 90 (194); Mehran Mumtaz 4/89 (28 overs)

Match drawn
Iqbal Stadium, Faisalabad
Umpires: Ghaffar Kazmi and Nasir Hussain

- Northern won the toss and elected to bat.
- Abdul Faseeh, Kashif Ali and Mehran Mumtaz (Northern) all made their first-class debuts.

17–20 November 2021
Scorecard

Southern Punjab	v	Sindh
310 (101.3 overs); Umar Siddiq 84 (204); Sohail Khan 4/62 (25.3 overs)		350/9d (85 overs); Saad Khan 90 (115); Ali Usman 4/75 (19 overs)
239/8 (74.4 overs); Tayyab Tahir 75 (179); Mohammad Asghar 4/96 (28 overs)

Match drawn
Gaddafi Stadium, Lahore
Umpires: Shozab Raza and Waleed Yaqub

- Toss uncontested, Sindh elected to field.

17–20 November 2021
Scorecard

Central Punjab	v	Khyber Pakhtunkhwa
270 (88.3 overs); Mohammad Saad 98 (180); Sameen Gul 3/55 (21 overs)		212 (50.2 overs); Asif Afridi 61* (54); Mohammad Ali 6/52 (19 overs)
290/8d (77.2 overs); Ali Zaryab 131 (219); Khalid Usman 3/26 (6.2 overs)		109/5 (47 overs); Sahibzada Farhan 35 (69); Mohammad Ali 3/42 (15 overs)

Match drawn
Multan Cricket Stadium, Multan
Umpires: Qaiser Waheed and Saqib Khan

- Toss uncontested, Khyber Pakhtunkhwa elected to field.

=== Round 6 ===
24–27 November 2021
Scorecard

Balochistan	v	Sindh
96 (31.5 overs); Imran Butt 33 (84); Abrar Ahmed 5/23 (5.5 overs)		442 (95.2 overs); Ahsan Ali 194 (220); Khurram Shahzad 3/80 (14 overs)
158 (43.2 overs); Ayaz Tasawwar 45 (65); Abrar Ahmed 6/40 (10.2 overs)

Sindh won by an innings and 188 runs
United Bank Limited Sports Complex, Karachi
Umpires: Imran Javed and Zameer Haider

- Sindh won the toss and elected to field.

24–27 November 2021
Scorecard

Southern Punjab	v	Central Punjab
228 (77 overs); Umar Siddiq 85 (187); Waqas Maqsood 4/52 (18 overs)		459 (116.4 overs); Rizwan Hussain 253 (337); Aamer Yamin 5/122 (28.4 overs)
175 (47.3 overs); Yousuf Babar 47 (120); Bilawal Iqbal 5/12 (12.3 overs)

Central Punjab won by an innings and 56 runs
State Bank of Pakistan Sports Complex, Karachi

- Toss uncontested, Central Punjab elected to field.

24–27 November 2021
Scorecard

Northern	v	Khyber Pakhtunkhwa
250 (83.4 overs); Mubasir Khan 96 (174); Arshad Iqbal 2/38 (17 overs)		284 (93.4 overs); Adil Amin 128* (260); Kashif Ali 5/45 (21.4 overs)
256 (78.2 overs); Umar Amin 110 (196); Asif Afridi 3/60 (22)		225/6 (60.5 overs); Ashfaq Ahmed 45 (75); Muhammad Zaid 2/29 (10 overs)

Khyber Pakhtunkhwa won by 4 wickets
National Bank of Pakistan Sports Complex, Karachi

- Toss uncontested, Khyber Pakhtunkhwa elected to field.

=== Round 7 ===
30 November–3 December 2021
Scorecard

Southern Punjab	v	Balochistan
483 (117.5 overs); Agha Salman 135 (209); Akif Javed 3/78 (21 overs)		606 (124 overs); Ayaz Tasawwar 149 (210); Hassan Khan 3/27 (10 overs)
311 (78 overs); Tayyab Tahir 86 (183); Kashif Bhatti 4/52 (22 overs)		24/0 (5 overs); Shan Masood 17* (12)

Match drawn
United Bank Limited Sports Complex, Karachi
Umpires: Imran Javed and Zameer Haider

- Toss uncontested, Balochistan elected to field.
- Adeel-ur-Rehman (Southern Punjab) made his first-class debut.

30 November–3 December 2021
Scorecard

Sindh	v	Khyber Pakhtunkhwa
145 (42.1 overs); Asad Shafiq 31 (55); Irfanullah Shah 5/43 (12 overs)		265/9d (64.1 overs); Musadiq Ahmed 75 (103); Sohail Khan 5/82 (21.1 overs)
377 (124.1 overs); Khurram Manzoor 107 (280); Irfanullah Shah 4/51 (25.1 overs)		130 (44.1 overs); Iftikhar Ahmed 44 (61); Mir Hamza 6/33 (12.1 overs)

Sindh won by 127 runs
State Bank of Pakistan Sports Complex, Karachi
Umpires: Imtiaz Iqbal and Waleed Yaqub

- Toss uncontested, Khyber Pakhtunkhwa elected to field.

30 November–3 December 2021
Scorecard

Northern	v	Central Punjab
445/8d (106 overs); Haider Ali 206 (221); Mohammad Ali 3/68 (22 overs)		257 (71.5 overs); Hussain Talat 51 (98); Haris Rauf 6/47 (18 overs)
20/1 (7.3 overs); Muhammad Zaid 11* (15); Bilawal Iqbal 1/11 (4 overs)		207 (77.2 overs) (f/o); Ali Zaryab 71 (169); Mubasir Khan 6/43 (24.2 overs)

Northern won by 9 wickets
National Bank of Pakistan Sports Complex, Karachi
Umpires: Faisal Afridi and Ghaffar Kazmi

- Toss uncontested, Khyber Central Punjab elected to field.
- Haider Ali (Northern) scored his maiden double century in first-class cricket.

=== Round 8 ===
6–9 December 2021
Scorecard

Balochistan	v	Central Punjab
325 (104.4 overs); Shan Masood 102 (142); Zafar Gohar 5/126 (39 overs)		262 (98.5 overs); Rizwan Hussain 50 (98); Kashif Bhatti 7/85 (40 overs)
148 (33.2 overs); Gohar Faiz 36 (43); Mohammad Ali 5/50 (11 overs)		212/5 (59 overs); Mohammad Saad 63* (123); Akif Javed 2/43 (11 overs)

Central Punjab won by 5 wickets
National Bank of Pakistan Sports Complex, Karachi
Umpires: Ghaffar Kazmi and Saqib Khan

- Central Punjab won the toss and elected to field.

6–9 December 2021
Scorecard

Sindh	v	Northern
98/9d (31 overs); Omair Yousuf 33 (74); Athar Mahmood 4/23 (10 overs)		319 (100.1 overs); Sarmad Bhatti 145 (299); Tabish Khan 5/55 (23.1 overs)
182 (58.3 overs); Omair Yousuf 52 (125); Athar Mahmood 4/61 (16 overs)

Northern won by an innings and 39 runs
United Bank Limited Sports Complex, Karachi
Umpires: Imran Javed and Zameer Haider

- Toss uncontested, Northern elected to field.
- Mohammad Taha (Sindh) made his first-class debut.

6–9 December 2021
Scorecard

Southern Punjab	v	Khyber Pakhtunkhwa
166/9d (57.1 overs); Mohammad Imran 64 (83); Arshad Iqbal 4/41 (14.1 overs)		281 (89.2 overs); Arshad Iqbal 62 (102); Mohammad Ilyas 4/71 (22.2 overs)
334 (94.1 overs); Umar Siddiq 92 (176); Irfanullah Shah 4/68 (21 overs)		223/3 (56.5 overs); Sahibzada Farhan 112* (159); Mohammad Ilyas 2/61 (18 overs)

Khyber Pakhtunkhwa won by 7 wickets
State Bank of Pakistan Sports Complex, Karachi
Umpires: Imtiaz Iqbal and Waleed Yaqub

- Toss uncontested, Khyber Pakhtunkhwa elected to field.

=== Round 9 ===
12–15 December 2021
Scorecard

Khyber Pakhtunkhwa	v	Balochistan
116 (41 overs); Kamran Ghulam 31 (68); Taj Wali 4/19 (13 overs)		100 (26 overs); Ayaz Tasawwar 22 (26); Arshad Iqbal 4/31 (10 overs)
264 (18 overs); Ashfaq Ahmed 73 (164); Taj Wali 7/68 (22.1 overs)		135 (34.3 overs); Shan Masood 70 (83); Sajid Khan 6/28 (8.3 overs)

Khyber Pakhtunkhwa won by 145 runs
United Bank Limited Sports Complex, Karachi
Umpires: Imran Javed and Zameer Haider

- Toss uncontested, Balochistan elected to field.
- Tariq Jameel (Balochistan) made his first-class debut.

12–15 December 2021
Scorecard

Sindh	v	Central Punjab
155/9d (52 overs); Sohail Khan 65 (91); Mohammad Ali 3/20 (13 overs)		187/9d (58.5 overs); Abid Ali 98 (174); Abrar Ahmed 3/37 (14 overs)
338 (105.3 overs); Asad Shafiq 97 (179); Ahmed Safi Abdullah 4/58 (17.3 overs)		295 (79.5 overs); Ali Shan 100 (165); Sohail Khan 4/63 (18 overs)

Sindh won by 11 runs
State Bank of Pakistan Sports Complex, Karachi
Umpires: Nasir Hussain and Waleed Yaqub

- Toss uncontested, Central Punjab elected to field.

12–15 December 2021
Scorecard

Southern Punjab	v	Northern
238 (69.5 overs); Agha Salman 142 (193); Nauman Ali 6/104 (31.5 overs)		421/9d (108 overs); Faizan Riaz 168 (269); Ali Usman 4/131 (46 overs)
219 (53.4 overs); Mohammad Imran 91 (103); Nauman Ali 6/92 (23 overs)

Northern won by an innings and 5 runs
National Bank of Pakistan Sports Complex, Karachi
Umpires: Ghaffar Kazmi and Imtiaz Iqbal

- Toss uncontested, Northern elected to field.

=== Round 10 ===
18–21 December 2021
Scorecard

Balochistan	v	Northern
305 (59.1 overs); Shan Masood 190 (172); Kashif Ali 4/49 (12.1 overs)		621/4d (124 overs); Mohammad Huraira 311 (343); Akif Javed 2/105 (23 overs)
146 (34.4 overs); Imran Butt 81 (101); Mubasir Khan 6/43 (10.4 overs)

Northern won by an innings and 170 runs
State Bank of Pakistan Sports Complex, Karachi
Umpires: Nasir Hussain and Qaiser Waheed

- Toss uncontested, Northern elected to field.

18–21 December 2021
Scorecard

Sindh	v	Southern Punjab
310 (96.5 overs); Saad Khan 88 (169); Naseem Shah 4/46 (13.5 overs)		385 (94 overs); Zeeshan Ashraf 108 (110); Shahnawaz Dahani 3/61 (17 overs)
306 (76.2 overs); Saad Khan 63 (93); Ali Usman 4/102 (24 overs)		183 (55 overs); Yousuf Babar 57 (124); Zahid Mahmood 6/101 (24 overs)

Sindh won by 48 runs
National Bank of Pakistan Sports Complex, Karachi
Umpires: Ghaffar Kazmi and Imtiaz Iqbal

- Toss uncontested, Southern Punjab elected to field.
- Mohammad Junaid (Southern Punjab) made his first-class debut.

18–21 December 2021
Scorecard

Khyber Pakhtunkhwa	v	Central Punjab
355 (95.3 overs); Fakhar Zaman 76 (128); Mohammad Ali 3/65 (19 overs)		110 (31.5 overs); Azhar Ali 43 (77); Sameen Gul 3/30 (11 overs)
249/4d (67 overs); Fakhar Zaman 62 (102); Bilawal Iqbal 3/45 (13 overs)		250 (101.5 overs); Rizwan Hussain 67 (145); Sameen Gul 3/42 (20 overs)

Khyber Pakhtunkhwa won by 244 runs
United Bank Limited Sports Complex, Karachi
Umpires: Imran Javed and Zameer Haider

- Toss uncontested, Central Punjab elected to field.

== Final ==
25–29 December 2021 (D/N)
Scorecard

Khyber Pakhtunkhwa	v	Northern
374 (118.2 overs); Iftikhar Ahmed 102 (170); Mubasir Khan 4/52 (19.2 overs)		256 (83.2 overs); Haider Ali 81 (131); Sajid Khan 4/54 (27.2 overs)
265 (79.2 overs); Rehan Afridi 79 (110); Mohammad Nawaz 4/65 (30.2 overs)		214 (45.2 overs); Mohammad Huraira 57 (49); Sajid Khan 5/33 (13.2 overs)

Khyber Pakhtunkhwa win by 169 runs
National Stadium, Karachi
Umpires: Faisal Afridi and Asif Yaqoob
Player of the match: Iftikhar Ahmed (Khyber Pakhtunkhwa)

- Northern won the toss and elected to field.
- No play was possible on day 3 due to rain.
