= 2022 Pakistan Super League players draft =

List of cricketers

The players draft for the seventh season of Pakistan Super League took place on 12 December 2021 at the High Performance Centre in Lahore. Before the draft, the teams were allowed to retain a maximum of 8 players from the previous season and make any transfers. The transfer and retention window closed on 10 December 2021.

== Background ==
The Pakistan Cricket Board announced that Lahore Qalandars will have the first pick of the draft. The total purse for each team was capped at $1.2 million.

Each team was also allowed to pick two additional players in the supplementary round. They also had the right to exercise one wildcard pick. In a first in PSL, right-to-match cards were introduced allowing franchises to buy back a maximum of one player that they have released on the draft day by paying the respective fee against each category:

- Platinum ($130,000-$170,000)
- Diamond ($60,000-$80,000)
- Gold ($40,000-$50,000)
- Silver ($15,000-$25,000)
- Emerging ($7,500)

== Transfers ==
Shahid Afridi and Englishman James Vince were traded from the Multan Sultans to the Quetta Gladiators. As part of the transfer, the Sultans took Quetta's diamond and silver round picks, respectively. 2021 season's Islamabad United players Iftikhar Ahmed was swapped with Quetta Gladiators' wicket-keeper-batsman Azam Khan, while Hussain Talat was traded to Peshawar Zalmi in return for Zalmi's silver category 2nd-round pick.

== Retained players ==
On 10 December 2021, the Pakistan Cricket Board announced the retention players list. All the teams were allowed to retain a maximum of 8 players from the previous season. All four franchises fully utilized their quota of eight player retentions apart from Multan Sultans and Quetta Gladiators.

Class	Islamabad United	Karachi Kings	Lahore Qalandars	Multan Sultans	Peshawar Zalmi	Quetta Gladiators
Platinum	Asif Ali; Hasan Ali	Babar Azam; Imad Wasim	Shaheen Afridi; Rashid Khan	Mohammad Rizwan; Rilee Rossouw	Wahab Riaz; Liam Livingstone	James Vince; Sarfaraz Ahmed
Diamond	Shadab Khan (ambassador); Faheem Ashraf	Mohammad Nabi; Mohammad Amir	David Wiese; Haris Rauf (ambassador); Mohammad Hafeez	Sohaib Maqsood; Imran Tahir (mentor)	Shoaib Malik; Sherfane Rutherford; Haider Ali	Iftikhar Ahmed; Mohammad Nawaz
Gold	Alex Hales (mentor); Mohammad Wasim Jr; Azam Khan	Joe Clarke (ambassador); Sharjeel Khan; Aamer Yamin		Shan Masood; Khushdil Shah (ambassador); Shahnawaz Dahani	Saqib Mahmood (ambassador); Hussain Talat	Shahid Afridi (mentor); Mohammad Hasnain (ambassador); Naseem Shah
Silver	Paul Stirling	Mohammad Ilyas	Sohail Akhtar; Zeeshan Ashraf; Ahmed Daniyal		Tom Kohler-Cadmore	

== Draft picks ==
More than 425 players from 32 countries were registered for the draft. For the emerging category, players should be under 23 as of 1 January 2022 and could have either played less than 10 PSL matches in previous seasons but have not been selected in the national squad.

Class	Islamabad United	Karachi Kings	Lahore Qalandars	Multan Sultans	Peshawar Zalmi	Quetta Gladiators
Platinum	Colin Munro	Chris Jordan	Fakhar Zaman	Tim David	Hazratullah Zazai	Jason Roy
Diamond	Marchant de Lange	Lewis Gregory		Odean Smith		James Faulkner
Gold			Abdullah Shafique; Phil Salt; Harry Brook		Usman Qadir	
Silver	Muhammad Akhlaq; Reece Topley; Danish Aziz; Zafar Gohar	Umaid Asif; Tom Abell; Rohail Nazir; Mohammad Imran	Kamran Ghulam; Dean Foxcroft	Rumman Raees; Anwar Ali; Asif Afridi; Rovman Powell; Imran Khan	Salman Irshad; Arshad Iqbal; Sameen Gul; Kamran Akmal	Umar Akmal; Sohail Tanvir; Ben Duckett; Khurram Shahzad; Naveen-ul-Haq
Emerging	Mubasir Khan; Zeeshan Zameer (Note: Right To Match card (RTM): Player being picked by other franchise in the draft but his previous season franchise used the Right To Match card option under the draft rules to bring back in their squad.)	Faisal Akram; Qasim Akram	Zaman Khan; Maaz Khan	Abbas Afridi; Aamer Azmat	Sirajuddin; Mohammad Amir Khan	Abdul Bangalzai; Ashir Qureshi
Supplementary	Rahmanullah Gurbaz; Athar Mahmood	Talha Ahsan; Romario Shepherd	Samit Patel; Syed Faridoun	Blessing Muzarabani; Ihsanullah	Ben Cutting; Mohammad Haris	Noor Ahmad; Ahsan Ali

== Replacements ==
A replacement player draft took place through a virtual session on 8 January 2022, in which the franchises were also allowed on their request to pick additional two supplementary players. The order of selection was decided through random draw, with each team allowed to pick maximum one foreign player. Zalmi and Gladiators, each reserved their one pick; and announced the names on 17 January.

Class	IU	KK	LQ	MS	PZ	QG
Supplementary	Muhammad Musa; Zahir Khan	Sahibzada Farhan; Jordan Thompson	Mohammad Imran; Akif Javed	David Willey; Rizwan Hussain	Mohammad Umar; Sohail Khan	Ghulam Mudassar; Dan Lawrence

Player	Team	Replaced with	Availability	Reason
Odean Smith	MS	Johnson Charles	Full	National duty
Naveen-ul-Haq	QG	Luke Wood	Full	Personal reason
Tom Abell	KK	Ian Cockbain	Full	Personal reason
Romario Shepherd	KK	Tom Lammonby	Full	National duty
Mohammad Amir Khan	PZ	Arish Ali Khan	Full	Injured
Reece Topley	IU	Waqas Maqsood	Full	Personal reason
James Vince	QG	Will Smeed	Partial	National duty
Saqib Mahmood	PZ	Matt Parkinson	Partial	National duty
Phil Salt	LQ	Ben Dunk	Partial	National duty
Rovman Powell	MS	Dominic Drakes	Partial	National duty
Jason Roy	QG	Shimron Hetmyer	Partial	National duty
Liam Livingstone	PZ	Pat Brown	Partial	National duty
Chris Jordan	KK	Reserved	Partial	National duty
Zeeshan Zameer	IU	Mohammad Huraira	Partial	Selected in U-19 WC Squads
Qasim Akram	KK	Mohammad Taha	Partial	Selected in U-19 WC Squads
Faisal Akram	KK	Reserved	Partial	Selected in U-19 WC Squads
Noor Ahmad	QG	Ali Imran	Partial	Selected in U-19 WC Squads
Harry Brook	LQ	Matty Potts	Partial	National duty
Shahid Afridi	QG	Hasan Khan	Partial	Injured
Paul Stirling	IU	Liam Dawson	Partial	National duty
Mohammad Nawaz	QG	Hasan Khan	Partial	Injured
Rashid Khan	LQ	Fawad Khan	Partial	National duty
Dan Lawrence	QG	Will Smeed	Full	Injured
Mohammad Imran	KK	Mir Hamza	Partial	Injured

Few other replacements were announced afterwards. Earlier, players from Cricket South Africa were also in contact to sign in due to cancellation of the 2022 Mzansi Super League, however they were not allowed due to prior commitments of South African cricket team in New Zealand in 2021–22.

List of additional players to be kept in a bio-secure bubble, in case of emergency replacement was announced on 20 January.
