= Bangladesh A cricket team in Pakistan in 2024 =

International cricket tour

	Pakistan Shaheens	Bangladesh A
- Dates: 13 – 30 August 2024
Captains	Saud Shakeel (Note: Kamran Ghulam captained Pakistan Shaheens in the 2nd unofficial Test.) (First-class); Mohammad Haris (List A)	Anamul Haque (First-class); Towhid Hridoy (List A)

FC series
- Result: 2-match series drawn 0–0
Most runs	Umar Amin (177)	Jaker Ali (172)
Most wickets	Mir Hamza (5)	Tanzim Hasan Sakib (2); Hasan Murad (2)

LA series
- Result: Pakistan Shaheens won the 3-match series 1–0
Most runs	Usman Khan (87)	Saif Hassan (58)
Most wickets	Abbas Afridi (5)	Mahedi Hasan (1)

The Bangladesh A cricket team toured Pakistan in August 2024 to play against Pakistan Shaheens. The tour consists of three List A and two first-class matches. The series forms part of both teams' preparation for the upcoming ICC World Test Championship fixtures.

Due to the 2024 Bangladesh quota reform movement in Bangladesh, A cricket team's arrival in Pakistan was delayed by 48 hours, and the entire tournament's schedule was revised.

== Squads ==
Pakistan Shaheens		Bangladesh A	
First-class	List A	First-class	List A
Saud Shakeel (c); Mohammad Ali; Sarfaraz Ahmed (wk); Saim Ayub; Umar Amin; Saad Baig (wk); Kamran Ghulam; Sameen Gul; Mir Hamza; Saad Khan; Mohammad Huraira; Mehran Mumtaz; Mohammad Rameez; Naseem Shah	Mohammad Haris (c, wk); Abdul Faseeh; Arafat Minhas; Azan Awais; Faisal Akram; Haseebullah Khan (wk); Jahandad Khan; Mehran Mumtaz; Abbas Afridi; Irfan Khan; Mohammad Imran; Mubasir Khan; Omair Yousuf; Usman Khan	Anamul Haque (c); Jaker Ali; Mahidul Islam Ankon; Sahadat Hossain; Zakir Hasan; Mominul Haque; Mosaddek Hossain; Nayeem Hasan; Saif Hassan; Towhid Hridoy; Mahmudul Hasan Joy; Tanvir Islam; Hasan Murad; Hasan Mahmud; Mohammad Naim; Mushfiqur Rahim; Rejaur Rahman Raja; Ruyel Miah; Mohammad Saifuddin; Soumya Sarkar; Tanzim Hasan Sakib	Towhid Hridoy (c); Jaker Ali; Mahidul Islam Ankon; Anamul Haque; Mahedi Hasan; Rishad Hossain; Saif Hassan; Mosaddek Hossain; Tanvir Islam; Ruyel Miah; Mohammad Naim; Rejaur Rahman Raja; Mohammad Saifuddin; Soumya Sarkar; Tanzim Hasan Sakib

On 19 August 2024, PCB announced squads for 2nd four-day match with Kamran Ghulam as a captain along with Abrar Ahmed, Ali Zaryab, Ghulam Mudassar, Imam-ul-Haq, Mohammad Awais Anwar, Niaz Khan, Qasim Akram, Rohail Nazir (wk), Saad Khan and Sharoon Siraj.

== Unofficial Test series ==
=== 1st unofficial Test ===
13–16 August 2024
Scorecard

Bangladesh A	v	Pakistan Shaheens
122 (44.3 overs); Mahmudul Hasan Joy 65 (116); Naseem Shah 3/24 (8.3 overs)		367/4d (90 overs); Umar Amin 177 (211); Hasan Murad 2/49 (13 overs)
153/5 (39.2 overs); Nayeem Hasan 55 (69); Mir Hamza 2/13 (6.2 overs)

Match drawn
Islamabad Club Cricket Oval, Islamabad
Umpires: Faisal Afridi (Pak) and Imran Javed (Pak)

- Bangladesh A won the toss and elected to bat.
- No play was possible on day 3 due to rain and wet outfield.

=== 2nd unofficial Test ===
20–23 August 2024
Scorecard

Bangladesh A	v	Pakistan Shaheens
404/9d (98 overs); Jaker Ali 172 (286); Abrar Ahmed 4/103 (36 overs)		281/4 (65 overs); Ali Zaryab 117 (132); Tanzim Hasan Sakib 1/40 (12 overs)

Match drawn
Islamabad Club Cricket Oval, Islamabad
Umpires: Faisal Afridi (Pak) and Nasir Hussain (Pak)

- Pakistan Shaheens won the toss and elected to field.
- No play was possible on day 1 and 2 due to rain and wet outfield.
- Saad Baig (Pakistan Shaheens) made his first-class debut.

== Unofficial ODI series ==
=== 1st unofficial ODI ===
26 August 2024
10:00
Scorecard

Bangladesh A 183 (36 overs)	v	Pakistan Shaheens; 184/2 (27.5 overs)
Saif Hassan 58 (47); Abbas Afridi 5/38 (9 overs)		Usman Khan 87 (60); Mahedi Hasan 1/19 (5 overs)

Pakistan Shaheens won by 8 wickets
Islamabad Club Cricket Oval, Islamabad
Umpires: Abdul Muqeet (Pak) and Rashid Riaz (Pak)
Player of the match: Abbas Afridi (Pakistan Shaheens)

- Pakistan Shaheens won the toss and elected to field.

=== 2nd unofficial ODI ===
28 August 2024
10:00
Scorecard

Pakistan Shaheens	v	Bangladesh A

Match abandoned
Islamabad Club Cricket Oval, Islamabad
Umpires: Rashid Riaz (Pak) and Waleed Yaqub (Pak)

- No toss.
- No play was possible due to a rain and wet outfield.

=== 3rd unofficial ODI ===
30 August 2024
10:00
Scorecard

Pakistan Shaheens	v	Bangladesh A

Match abandoned
Islamabad Club Cricket Oval, Islamabad
Umpires: Rashid Riaz (Pak) and Waleed Yaqub (Pak)

- No toss.
- No play was possible due to a rain and wet outfield.
