= 2020–21 National T20 Cup =

Cricket tournament

- Dates: 30 September – 18 October 2020
- Administrator: Pakistan Cricket Board
- Cricket format: Twenty20
- Tournament format(s): Double round-robin and final
- Host: Pakistan
- Champions: Khyber Pakhtunkhwa (1st title)
- Participants: 6
- Matches: 33
- Player of the series: Fakhar Zaman
- Most runs: Fakhar Zaman (420)
- Most wickets: Shaheen Afridi (20)
- Official website: National T20 Cup

The 2020–21 National T20 Cup was a Twenty20 domestic cricket competition that was played in Pakistan. It was the 17th season of the National T20 Cup, and started on 30 September 2020, and finished on 18 October 2020. Northern cricket team were the defending champions. The season featured an expanded format, with the number of matches increasing from 18 to 33. In July 2020, the Pakistan Cricket Board (PCB) announced that the tournament would be held either in Multan or Rawalpindi. In August 2020, it was confirmed that the first leg will be played in Multan, and the final leg in Rawalpindi.

On the opening day of the tournament, Abdullah Shafique of Central Punjab scored a century on his debut. He became the second cricketer, after India's Shivam Bhambri, to score a century on both his T20 and first-class debuts. Khyber Pakhtunkhwa's bowler Shaheen Afridi took two five-wicket hauls in four games, with 5/20 against Balochistan, and 5/21 against Sindh. Following the conclusion of the matches in Multan, Northern won all five of their games to lead the tournament. They also recorded their tenth-consecutive victory in T20 cricket, equalling the record of the Lahore Lions.

In the first match in Rawalpindi, Northern's winning streak came to an end, after they lost to Central Punjab. The next match saw Khushdil Shah score the fastest century in a Twenty20 match by a Pakistani batsman, doing so in 35 balls. On 10 October 2020, Shoaib Malik became the first Pakistani batsman to score 10,000 runs in Twenty20 cricket, doing so in Khyber Pakhtunkhwa's match against Balochistan. On 12 October 2020, during the match against Balochistan, Central Punjab's captain Babar Azam became the fastest batsman to score 1,000 runs in the tournament, doing so in his 27th innings. The following day, Kamran Akmal, also playing for Central Punjab, became the first wicket-keeper to affect 100 stumpings in Twenty20 cricket.

On 11 October 2020, Northern became the first team to progress to the semi-finals of the tournament, after they beat Southern Punjab by five runs, giving them six wins from their first seven matches. Following the conclusion of the first match played on 14 October 2020, Khyber Pakhtunkhwa and Sindh had also qualified for the semi-finals. On 16 October 2020, Southern Punjab became the fourth and final team to reach the semi-finals, after they beat Balochistan by seven wickets. The fixture was also the final professional match to be played by Umar Gul, who retired from cricket following a career that spanned twenty years.

In the first semi-final, Southern Punjab beat Northern by seven wickets to advance to the final of the tournament. The second semi-final saw Khyber Pakhtunkhwa beat Sindh by eight wickets to join Southern Punjab in the tournament's final. In the final, Khyber Pakhtunkhwa beat Southern Punjab by ten runs to win the tournament.

== Squads ==
Balochistan	Central Punjab	Khyber Pakhtunkhwa	Northern	Sindh	Southern Punjab
Haris Sohail (c); Bismillah Khan (vc), (wk); Akbar-ur-Rehman; Akif Javed; Amad Butt; Awais Zia; Imam-ul-Haq; Imran Butt; Imran Farhat; Kashif Bhatti; Khurram Shehzad; Taimur Khan; Umaid Asif; Umar Gul; Usama Mir; Yasir Shah; Abdul Bangalzai; Akhtar Shah; Taj Wali	Babar Azam (c); Saad Nasim (vc); Abdullah Shafique; Abid Ali; Ahmed Bashir; Bilal Asif; Ehsan Adil; Faheem Ashraf; Irfan Khan; Kamran Akmal (wk); Naseem Shah; Qasim Akram; Rizwan Hussain; Sohaibullah; Usman Qadir; Zafar Gohar; Ali Shan; Muhammad Akhlaq; Waqas Maqsood	Mohammad Rizwan (c), (wk); Junaid Khan (vc); Arshad Iqbal; Asif Afridi; Fakhar Zaman; Iftikhar Ahmed; Imran Khan; Mohammad Hafeez; Mohammad Haris (wk); Mohammad Mohsin; Sahibzada Farhan; Shaheen Afridi; Shoaib Malik; Usman Shinwari; Wahab Riaz; Zohaib Khan	Imad Wasim (c); Shadab Khan (vc); Ali Imran; Asif Ali; Raja Farzan; Haider Ali; Hammad Azam; Haris Rauf; Mohammad Amir; Mohammad Nawaz; Muhammad Musa; Rohail Nazir (wk); Sohail Akhtar; Sohail Tanvir; Umar Amin; Zeeshan Malik; Mohammad Ismail	Sarfaraz Ahmed (c), (wk); Saud Shakeel (vc); Ahsan Ali; Anwar Ali; Asad Shafiq; Azam Khan; Danish Aziz; Hassan Khan; Khurram Manzoor; Mir Hamza; Mohammad Asghar; Mohammad Hasnain; Mohammad Taha; ~~Rumman Raees~~; Sharjeel Khan; Sohail Khan; Ghulam Mudassar	Shan Masood (c); Hussain Talat (vc); Aamer Yamin; Ali Shafiq; Bilawal Bhatti; Khushdil Shah; Mohammad Abbas; Mohammad Ilyas; Mohammad Irfan; Rahat Ali; Saif Badar; Sohaib Maqsood; Umer Khan; Umar Siddiq; Zahid Mahmood; Zeeshan Ashraf (wk); Dilbar Hussain; Mohammad Imran; Zain Abbas

On 9 September 2020, the PCB confirmed all the squads for the tournament. Central Punjab cricketer Salman Butt refused to take part in the tournament, after he was demoted from the team's first XI. Later in September 2020, Sindh's Rumman Raees was ruled out of the tournament due to a spinal injury, with Ghulam Mudassar named as his replacement. In Central Punjab's squad, Ali Shan replaced Faheem Ashraf, who was ruled out for the matches in Multan, due to fitness issues. Mohammad Ismail replaced Imad Wasim in Northern's squad, for the matches in Multan.

Ahead of the matches in Rawalpindi, three teams made changes to their squads, as they picked performing players from their respective second XI squads. Balochistan added Abdul Bangalzai, who replaced Imran Farhat. Central Punjab replaced Bilal Asif with Muhammad Akhlaq. Southern Punjab also made changes to their squad; Bilawal Bhatti, Mohammad Irfan and Rahat Ali were left out, with Dilbar Hussain, Mohammad Imran and Zain Abbas being included. On 10 October 2020, Naseem Shah was withdrawn from Central Punjab's squad following a groin injury, and was replaced by Waqas Maqsood. On 14 October 2020, Balochistan made two changes to their squad, with Umaid Asif and Akif Javed being replaced by Akhtar Shah and Taj Wali respectively.

== Points table ==
Pos	Team	Pld	W	L	NR	Pts	NRR
1	Northern	10	8	2	0	16	0.895
2	Khyber Pakhtunkhwa	10	5	5	0	10	0.116
3	Sindh	10	5	5	0	10	−0.220
4	Southern Punjab	10	4	6	0	8	0.166
5	Central Punjab	10	4	6	0	8	0.046
6	Balochistan	10	4	6	0	8	−1.042

Source: Cricinfo
- Advanced to the semi-finals

== Fixtures ==
On 24 September 2020, the PCB named all the match officials for the tournament.

=== Round-robin ===
30 September 2020
15:00
Scorecard

Northern; 242/3 (20 overs)	v	Khyber Pakhtunkhwa; 163/9 (20 overs)
Haider Ali 90 (48); Junaid Khan 2/44 (4 overs)		Sahibzada Farhan 62 (48); Muhammad Musa 3/31 (4 overs)

Northern won by 79 runs
Multan Cricket Stadium, Multan
Umpires: Faisal Afridi and Zameer Haider
Player of the match: Haider Ali (Northern)

- Northern won the toss and elected to bat.

30 September 2020
19:30 (D/N)
Scorecard

Southern Punjab; 200/8 (20 overs)	v	Central Punjab; 201/3 (18.5 overs)
Sohaib Maqsood 51 (26); Sohaibullah 3/26 (4 overs)		Abdullah Shafique 102* (58); Aamer Yamin 2/34 (3 overs)

Central Punjab won by 7 wickets
Multan Cricket Stadium, Multan
Umpires: Qaiser Waheed and Waleed Yaqub
Player of the match: Abdullah Shafique (Central Punjab)

- Southern Punjab won the toss and elected to bat.
- Abdullah Shafique, Irfan Khan and Qasim Akram (Central Punjab) all made their T20 debuts.
- Abdullah Shafique (Central Punjab) became the first Pakistani batsman to score a century on his first-class and T20 debut.

1 October 2020
15:00
Scorecard

Balochistan; 180/8 (20 overs)	v	Sindh; 178/9 (20 overs)
Bismillah Khan 58 (42); Mohammad Hasnain 2/31 (4 overs)		Asad Shafiq 32 (25); Amad Butt 3/39 (4 overs)

Balochistan won by 2 runs
Multan Cricket Stadium, Multan
Umpires: Aftab Gillani and Qaiser Waheed
Player of the match: Bismillah Khan (Balochistan)

- Balochistan won the toss and elected to bat.

1 October 2020
19:30 (D/N)
Scorecard

Northern; 203/5 (20 overs)	v	Southern Punjab; 176/9 (20 overs)
Ali Imran 50 (39); Zahid Mahmood 3/35 (4 overs)		Zeeshan Ashraf 72 (38); Haris Rauf 4/25 (4 overs)

Northern won by 27 runs
Multan Cricket Stadium, Multan
Umpires: Faisal Afridi and Zameer Haider
Player of the match: Shadab Khan (Northern)

- Northern won the toss and elected to bat.

2 October 2020
15:00
Scorecard

Balochistan; 152/9 (20 overs)	v	Khyber Pakhtunkhwa; 157/2 (17 overs)
Imran Butt 37 (32); Shaheen Afridi 5/20 (4 overs)		Mohammad Rizwan 57* (42); Amad Butt 1/25 (3 overs)

Khyber Pakhtunkhwa won by 8 wickets
Multan Cricket Stadium, Multan
Umpires: Waleed Yaqub and Zameer Haider
Player of the match: Shaheen Afridi (Khyber Pakhtunkhwa)

- Balochistan won the toss and elected to bat.

2 October 2020
19:30 (D/N)
Scorecard

Central Punjab; 154/7 (20 overs)	v	Sindh; 155/3 (18.5 overs)
Abid Ali 56 (40); Sohail Khan 3/31 (4 overs)		Sharjeel Khan 77 (56); Ehsan Adil 2/29 (3.5 overs)

Sindh won by 7 wickets
Multan Cricket Stadium, Multan
Umpires: Qaiser Waheed and Nasir Hussain
Player of the match: Sharjeel Khan (Sindh)

- Central Punjab won the toss and elected to bat.

3 October 2020
15:00
Scorecard

Northern; 155/8 (20 overs)	v	Central Punjab; 120 (18.1 overs)
Shadab Khan 30 (17); Usman Qadir 3/28 (4 overs)		Abid Ali 36 (33); Muhammad Musa 3/23 (4 overs)

Northern won by 35 runs
Multan Cricket Stadium, Multan
Umpires: Aftab Gillani and Faisal Afridi
Player of the match: Shadab Khan (Northern)

- Central Punjab won the toss and elected to field.

3 October 2020
19:30 (D/N)
Scorecard

Khyber Pakhtunkhwa; 200/5 (20 overs)	v	Southern Punjab; 194/8 (20 overs)
Mohammad Hafeez 67 (35); Rahat Ali 2/37 (4 overs)		Sohaib Maqsood 77 (40); Junaid Khan 3/26 (4 overs)

Khyber Pakhtunkhwa won by 6 runs
Multan Cricket Stadium, Multan
Umpires: Nasir Hussain and Zameer Haider
Player of the match: Mohammad Hafeez (Khyber Pakhtunkhwa)

- Southern Punjab won the toss and elected to field.

4 October 2020
15:00
Scorecard

Balochistan; 230/4 (20 overs)	v	Southern Punjab; 214/6 (20 overs)
Imam-ul-Haq 94 (54); Hussain Talat 1/35 (2 overs)		Khushdil Shah 72 (34); Akif Javed 3/35 (4 overs)

Balochistan won by 16 runs
Multan Cricket Stadium, Multan
Umpires: Qaiser Waheed and Waleed Yaqub
Player of the match: Imam-ul-Haq (Balochistan)

- Balochistan won the toss and elected to bat.

4 October 2020
19:30 (D/N)
Scorecard

Northern; 204/5 (20 overs)	v	Sindh; 191/7 (20 overs)
Zeeshan Malik 84 (52); Mohammad Hasnain 2/37 (4 overs)		Khurram Manzoor 64 (52); Shadab Khan 2/34 (4 overs)

Northern won by 13 runs
Multan Cricket Stadium, Multan
Umpires: Faisal Afridi and Nasir Hussain
Player of the match: Zeeshan Malik (Northern)

- Sindh won the toss and elected to field.

5 October 2020
15:00
Scorecard

Sindh; 183/7 (20 overs)	v	Khyber Pakhtunkhwa; 184/2 (19 overs)
Sharjeel Khan 90 (56); Shaheen Afridi 5/21 (4 overs)		Mohammad Hafeez 72* (42); Anwar Ali 2/40 (4 overs)

Khyber Pakhtunkhwa won by 8 wickets
Multan Cricket Stadium, Multan
Umpires: Aftab Gillani and Faisal Afridi
Player of the match: Shaheen Afridi (Khyber Pakhtunkhwa)

- Khyber Pakhtunkhwa won the toss and elected to field.

5 October 2020
19:30 (D/N)
Scorecard

Balochistan; 168/8 (20 overs)	v	Central Punjab; 165/7 (20 overs)
Imam-ul-Haq 80* (55); Ehsan Adil 3/40 (4 overs)		Abdullah Shafique 54 (41); Umar Gul 4/37 (4 overs)

Balochistan won by 3 runs
Multan Cricket Stadium, Multan
Umpires: Nasir Hussain and Zameer Haider
Player of the match: Umar Gul (Balochistan)

- Balochistan won the toss and elected to bat.

6 October 2020
15:00
Scorecard

Khyber Pakhtunkhwa; 178/7 (20 overs)	v	Central Punjab; 149 (19.2 overs)
Fakhar Zaman 66 (42); Ahmed Bashir 3/32 (4 overs)		Kamran Akmal 47 (37); Arshad Iqbal 2/20 (4 overs)

Khyber Pakhtunkhwa won by 29 runs
Multan Cricket Stadium, Multan
Umpires: Aftab Gillani and Faisal Afridi
Player of the match: Fakhar Zaman (Khyber Pakhtunkhwa)

- Khyber Pakhtunkhwa won the toss and elected to bat.

6 October 2020
19:30 (D/N)
Scorecard

Balochistan; 156/6 (20 overs)	v	Northern; 158/3 (17.5 overs)
Haris Sohail 51 (41); Sohail Tanvir 2/27 (4 overs)		Rohail Nazir 42 (27); Yasir Shah 2/32 (4 overs)

Northern won by 7 wickets
Multan Cricket Stadium, Multan
Umpires: Qaiser Waheed and Waleed Yaqub
Player of the match: Rohail Nazir (Northern)

- Balochistan won the toss and elected to bat.
- Khurram Shehzad (Balochistan) made his T20 debut.

9 October 2020
15:00
Scorecard

Northern; 165/9 (20 overs)	v	Central Punjab; 167/2 (17 overs)
Asif Ali 67 (40); Faheem Ashraf 4/18 (4 overs)		Babar Azam 86* (52); Shadab Khan 2/39 (4 overs)

Central Punjab won by 8 wickets
Rawalpindi Cricket Stadium, Rawalpindi
Umpires: Ahsan Raza and Imran Javed
Player of the match: Faheem Ashraf (Central Punjab)

- Northern won the toss and elected to bat.

9 October 2020
19:30 (D/N)
Scorecard

Sindh; 216/3 (20 overs)	v	Southern Punjab; 217/8 (19.4 overs)
Khurram Manzoor 108 (58); Mohammad Ilyas 2/40 (4 overs)		Khushdil Shah 100 (36); Anwar Ali 4/47 (4 overs)

Southern Punjab won by 2 wickets
Rawalpindi Cricket Stadium, Rawalpindi
Umpires: Ghaffar Kazmi and Rashid Riaz
Player of the match: Khushdil Shah (Southern Punjab)

- Southern Punjab won the toss and elected to field.
- Khushdil Shah (Southern Punjab) scored the fastest century in a T20 match by a Pakistani batsman (35 balls).

10 October 2020
15:00
Scorecard

Khyber Pakhtunkhwa; 154/6 (20 overs)	v	Balochistan; 156/4 (16.4 overs)
Shoaib Malik 74 (44); Akif Javed 2/20 (4 overs)		Awais Zia 92* (49); Shaheen Afridi 2/38 (4 overs)

Balochistan won by 6 wickets
Rawalpindi Cricket Stadium, Rawalpindi
Umpires: Ahsan Raza and Imtiaz Iqbal
Player of the match: Awais Zia (Balochistan)

- Balochistan won the toss and elected to field.
- Abdul Bangalzai (Balochistan) made his T20 debut.

10 October 2020
19:30 (D/N)
Scorecard

Central Punjab; 170/6 (20 overs)	v	Sindh; 171/7 (19.1 overs)
Babar Azam 86 (53); Sohail Khan 3/24 (4 overs)		Danish Aziz 59* (32); Waqas Maqsood 3/14 (3.1 overs)

Sindh won by 3 wickets
Rawalpindi Cricket Stadium, Rawalpindi
Umpires: Asif Yaqoob and Saqib Khan
Player of the match: Danish Aziz (Sindh)

- Sindh won the toss and elected to field.

11 October 2020
15:00
Scorecard

Northern; 145/7 (20 overs)	v	Southern Punjab; 140/8 (20 overs)
Sohail Akhtar 35 (32); Mohammad Ilyas 2/22 (4 overs)		Aamer Yamin 33* (19); Haris Rauf 4/23 (4 overs)

Northern won by 5 runs
Rawalpindi Cricket Stadium, Rawalpindi
Umpires: Imran Javed and Shozab Raza
Player of the match: Haris Rauf (Northern)

- Southern Punjab won the toss and elected to field.

11 October 2020
19:30 (D/N)
Scorecard

Balochistan; 173/3 (20 overs)	v	Sindh; 174/6 (19.1 overs)
Imam-ul-Haq 92* (60); Hassan Khan 1/29 (4 overs)		Sarfaraz Ahmed 44 (28); Amad Butt 2/26 (4 overs)

Sindh won by 4 wickets
Rawalpindi Cricket Stadium, Rawalpindi
Umpires: Ahsan Raza and Saqib Khan
Player of the match: Imam-ul-Haq (Balochistan) and Sarfaraz Ahmed (Sindh)

- Sindh won the toss and elected to field.

12 October 2020
15:00
Scorecard

Khyber Pakhtunkhwa; 205/4 (20 overs)	v	Southern Punjab; 132 (19.3 overs)
Fakhar Zaman 68 (34); Aamer Yamin 2/36 (4 overs)		Mohammad Imran 48 (28); Junaid Khan 2/31 (4 overs)

Khyber Pakhtunkhwa won by 73 runs
Rawalpindi Cricket Stadium, Rawalpindi
Umpires: Saqib Khan and Shozab Raza
Player of the match: Fakhar Zaman (Khyber Pakhtunkhwa)

- Southern Punjab won the toss and elected to field.

12 October 2020
19:30 (D/N)
Scorecard

Balochistan; 125/8 (20 overs)	v	Central Punjab; 127/1 (13.4 overs)
Haris Sohail 41 (36); Ahmed Bashir 4/23 (4 overs)		Babar Azam 64* (40); Amad Butt 1/24 (3 overs)

Central Punjab won by 9 wickets
Rawalpindi Cricket Stadium, Rawalpindi
Umpires: Imtiaz Iqbal and Rashid Riaz
Player of the match: Ahmed Bashir (Central Punjab)

- Central Punjab won the toss and elected to field.

13 October 2020
15:00
Scorecard

Khyber Pakhtunkhwa; 138/9 (20 overs)	v	Sindh; 140/8 (20 overs)
Usman Shinwari 36* (15); Sohail Khan 2/12 (4 overs)		Danish Aziz 72* (47); Usman Shinwari 3/20 (4 overs)

Sindh won by 2 wickets
Rawalpindi Cricket Stadium, Rawalpindi
Umpires: Imran Jawed and Rashid Riaz
Player of the match: Danish Aziz (Sindh)

- Sindh won the toss and elected to field.
- Mohammad Haris (Khyber Pakhtunkhwa) made his T20 debut.

13 October 2020
19:30 (D/N)
Scorecard

Southern Punjab; 205/3 (20 overs)	v	Central Punjab; 202/8 (20 overs)
Hussain Talat 59* (36); Zafar Gohar 2/20 (2 overs)		Faheem Ashraf 54 (22); Mohammad Abbas 3/41 (4 overs)

Southern Punjab won by 3 runs
Rawalpindi Cricket Stadium, Rawalpindi
Umpires: Asif Yaqoob and Imtiaz Iqbal
Player of the match: Mohammad Abbas (Southern Punjab)

- Central Punjab won the toss and elected to field.

14 October 2020
15:00
Scorecard

Sindh; 221/4 (20 overs)	v	Northern; 196/6 (20 overs)
Azam Khan 88 (43); Mohammad Amir 2/42 (4 overs)		Zeeshan Malik 61 (35); Mohammad Hasnain 3/28 (4 overs)

Sindh won by 25 runs
Rawalpindi Cricket Stadium, Rawalpindi
Umpires: Imtiaz Iqbal and Shozab Raza
Player of the match: Azam Khan (Sindh)

- Northern won the toss and elected to field.

14 October 2020
19:30 (D/N)
Scorecard

Central Punjab; 174/4 (20 overs)	v	Khyber Pakhtunkhwa; 171/6 (20 overs)
Abdullah Shafique 63 (48); Usman Shinwari 2/20 (4 overs)		Mohammad Rizwan 99* (68); Waqas Maqsood 3/43 (4 overs)

Central Punjab won by 3 runs
Rawalpindi Cricket Stadium, Rawalpindi
Umpires: Ahsan Raza and Ghaffar Kazm
Player of the match: Muhammad Akhlaq (Central Punjab)

- Khyber Pakhtunkhwa won the toss and elected to field.

15 October 2020
15:00
Scorecard

Northern; 199/6 (20 overs)	v	Balochistan; 160/8 (20 overs)
Haider Ali 86 (50); Amad Butt 2/29 (3 overs)		Imam-ul-Haq 35 (21); Mohammad Ismail 2/32 (4 overs)

Northern won by 39 runs
Rawalpindi Cricket Stadium, Rawalpindi
Umpires: Saqib Khan and Shozab Raza
Player of the match: Haider Ali (Northern)

- Northern won the toss and elected to bat.
- Akhtar Shah (Balochistan) made his T20 debut.

15 October 2020
19:30 (D/N)
Scorecard

Southern Punjab; 191/6 (20 overs)	v	Sindh; 121 (16.4 overs)
Sohaib Maqsood 67 (41); Danish Aziz 3/32 (4 overs)		Khurram Manzoor 49 (35); Zahid Mahmood 3/20 (4 overs)

Southern Punjab won by 70 runs
Rawalpindi Cricket Stadium, Rawalpindi
Umpires: Asif Yaqoob and Ghaffar Kazmi
Player of the match: Sohaib Maqsood (Southern Punjab)

- Sindh won the toss and elected to field.
- Mohammad Taha (Sindh) made his T20 debut.

16 October 2020
15:00
Scorecard

Northern; 144/9 (20 overs)	v	Khyber Pakhtunkhwa; 133/7 (20 overs)
Imad Wasim 36 (20); Wahab Riaz 5/21 (4 overs)		Mohammad Haris 79* (70); Haris Rauf 3/28 (4 overs)

Northern won by 11 runs
Rawalpindi Cricket Stadium, Rawalpindi
Umpires: Imran Javed and Rashid Riaz
Player of the match: Haris Rauf (Northern)

- Northern won the toss and elected to bat.

16 October 2020
19:30 (D/N)
Scorecard

Balochistan; 161/6 (20 overs)	v	Southern Punjab; 166/3 (10.4 overs)
Imam-ul-Haq 48 (37); Mohammad Imran 2/34 (4 overs)		Sohaib Maqsood 81 (29); Amad Butt 2/51 (3 overs)

Southern Punjab won by 7 wickets
Rawalpindi Cricket Stadium, Rawalpindi
Umpires: Ghaffar Kazmi and Shozab Raza
Player of the match: Sohaib Maqsood (Southern Punjab)

- Balochistan won the toss and elected to bat.

=== Finals ===
Semi-finals
1	Northern	160/5
4	Southern Punjab	161/3
2	Khyber Pakhtunkhwa	146/2
3	Sindh	142

Final
4	Southern Punjab	196/8
2	Khyber Pakhtunkhwa	206/4

1st Semi-final
17 October 2020
15:00
Scorecard

Northern; 160/5 (20 overs)	v	Southern Punjab; 161/3 (18.4 overs)
Ali Imran 50 (35); Zahid Mahmood 3/28 (4 overs)		Shan Masood 79* (58); Muhammad Musa 1/22 (2 overs)

Southern Punjab won by 7 wickets
Rawalpindi Cricket Stadium, Rawalpindi
Umpires: Asif Yaqoob and Rashid Riaz
Player of the match: Shan Masood (Southern Punjab)

- Northern won the toss and elected to bat.

2nd Semi-final
17 October 2020
19:30 (D/N)
Scorecard

Sindh; 142 (19.5 overs)	v	Khyber Pakhtunkhwa; 146/2 (14.5 overs)
Khurram Manzoor 74 (57); Imran Khan 2/19 (3 overs); Usman Shinwari 2/19 (3 overs)		Mohammad Rizwan 67 (50); Danish Aziz 2/35 (3.5 overs)

Khyber Pakhtunkhwa won by 8 wickets
Rawalpindi Cricket Stadium, Rawalpindi
Umpires: Ahsan Raza and Shozab Raza
Player of the match: Mohammad Rizwan (Khyber Pakhtunkhwa)

- Khyber Pakhtunkhwa won the toss and elected to field.

Final
18 October 2020
19:30 (D/N)
Scorecard

Khyber Pakhtunkhwa; 206/4 (20 overs)	v	Southern Punjab; 196/8 (20 overs)
Fakhar Zaman 67 (40); Zahid Mahmood 1/32 (4 overs)		Hussain Talat 63 (33); Shaheen Afridi 3/36 (4 overs); Wahab Riaz 3/36 (4 overs)

Khyber Pakhtunkhwa won by 10 runs
Rawalpindi Cricket Stadium, Rawalpindi
Umpires: Ahsan Raza and Asif Yaqoob
Player of the match: Shoaib Malik (Khyber Pakhtunkhwa)

- Southern Punjab won the toss and elected to field.
