= Bagh Stallions in 2021 =

1st season of Bagh Stallions in the Kashmir Premier League

Bagh Stallions
2021 season
- Coach: Abdul Rehman
- Captain: Shan Masood
- KPL 2021: 5th
- Most runs: Shan Masood (254)
- Most wickets: Umaid Asif (9)

Bagh Stallions is a franchise cricket team that represents Bagh in the Kashmir Premier League. They were coached by Abdul Rehman and captained by Shan Masood. Originally Shadab Khan was appointed as the captain of the team but Shan Masood took over as captain in place of Khan, who was occupied with the national team.

== Squad ==
- Players with international caps are listed in **bold**.
- Ages are correct as of 3 July 2021

No.	Name	Nationality	Birth date	Category	Batting style	Bowling style	Year signed	Notes
Batsmen
1	Zeeshan Malik	Pakistan	26 December 1996 (aged 24)	Silver	Right-handed	Right-arm off break	2021	
05	Raja Farhan Khan	Pakistan	8 July 1993 (aged 27)	Emerging	Right-handed		2021	Post-draft signing
81	**Asad Shafiq**	Pakistan	28 January 1986 (aged 35)	Platinum	Right-handed	Right-arm off break	2021	Post-draft signing
94	**Shan Masood**	Pakistan	14 October 1989 (aged 31)	Platinum	Left-handed	Right-arm fast-medium	2021	Captain
N/A	Usman Mughal	Pakistan	12 August 1996 (aged 24)	Silver			2021	
All-rounders
11	Furqan Shafique	England	29 November 1996 (aged 24)	Emerging	Right-handed	Right-arm off break	2021	
18	Mohammad Junaid	Pakistan	21 March 2002 (aged 19)	Emerging	Left-handed	Left-arm slow left-arm orthodox	2021	
34	**Aamer Yamin**	Pakistan	26 June 1990 (aged 31)	Gold	Right-handed	Right-arm medium	2021	Replacement Pick.
95	**Iftikhar Ahmed**	Pakistan	3 September 1990 (aged 30)	Diamond	Right-handed	Right-arm off break	2021	
N/A	**Shadab Khan**	Pakistan	4 October 1998 (aged 22)	Icon	Right-handed	Right-arm leg break	2021	
Wicket-keepers
6	Rohail Nazir	Pakistan	10 October 2001 (aged 19)	Gold	Right-handed		2021	
N/A	**Phil Mustard**	England	9 October 1982 (aged 38)	Overseas	Left-handed	Left-arm medium-fast	2021	Overseas; Pulled out of the tournament.
Bowlers
00	Mohammad Ilyas	Pakistan	21 March 1999 (aged 22)	Gold	Right-handed	Right-arm medium-fast	2021	
3	Aamir Sohail	Pakistan		Emerging		Left-arm slow left-arm orthodox	2021	
13	**Umaid Asif**	Pakistan	30 March 1984 (aged 37)	Diamond	Right-handed	Right-arm medium-fast	2021	
14	Mohammad Imran	Pakistan	20 January 2001 (aged 20)	Silver	Right-handed	Left-arm medium-fast	2021	
82	Sufiyan Muqeem	Pakistan		Emerging			2021	
88	Basit Ali	Pakistan		Emerging			2021	Post-draft signing
N/A	Zeeshan Zameer	Pakistan	10 August 2002 (aged 18)	Emerging	Right-handed	Right-arm fast-medium	2021	

== Season standings ==
=== Points table ===
Pos	Team	Pld	W	L	NR	Pts	NRR
1	Rawalakot Hawks (C)	5	3	1	1	7	0.228
2	Muzaffarabad Tigers (R)	5	3	2	0	6	0.530
3	Mirpur Royals (3rd)	5	3	2	0	6	−0.323
4	Overseas Warriors (4th)	5	2	3	0	4	−0.032
5	Bagh Stallions	5	2	3	0	4	−0.201
6	Kotli Lions	5	1	3	1	3	−0.107

Source: ESPNcricinfo
- Top 4 teams qualified for the playoffs
- Advanced to Qualifier
- Advanced to Eliminator 1

Notes:

- C = Champions;
- R = Runner-up;
- (x) = Position at the end of the tournament;

== League fixtures and results ==
Match 2
7 August 2021
14:00
Scorecard

Kotli Lions; 169 (20 overs)	v	Bagh Stallions; 172/5 (19.4 overs)
Ahsan Ali 51 (37); Mohammad Imran 3/25 (4 overs)		Asad Shafiq 43* (27); Imran Khan 3/30 (4 overs)

Bagh Stallions won by 5 wickets
Muzaffarabad Cricket Stadium, Muzaffarabad
Umpires: Ahsan Raza (Pak) and Ahmed Shahab (Pak)
Player of the match: Ahsan Ali (Kotli Lions)

- Kotli Lions won the toss and elected to bat.

Match 4
8 August 2021
14:00
Scorecard

Bagh Stallions; 211/6 (20 overs)	v	Mirpur Royals; 196/8 (20 overs)
Shan Masood 78 (45); Salman Irshad 3/47 (4 overs)		Muhammad Akhlaq 68 (39); Mohammad Imran 2/33 (4 overs)

Bagh Stallions won by 15 runs
Muzaffarabad Cricket Stadium, Muzaffarabad
Umpires: Ahmed Shahab (Pak) and Shozab Raza (Pak)
Player of the match: Shan Masood (Bagh Stallions)

- Mirpur Royals won the toss and elected to field.

Match 9
10 August 2021
19:30 (N)
Scorecard

Bagh Stallions; 186/7 (20 overs)	v	Overseas Warriors; 190/5 (19.2 overs)
Shan Masood 73 (45); Abbas Afridi 2/44 (4 overs)		Haider Ali 91 (57); Aamer Yamin 2/31 (4 overs)

Overseas Warriors won by 5 wickets
Muzaffarabad Cricket Stadium, Muzaffarabad
Umpires: Faisal Afridi (Pak) and Shozab Raza (Pak)
Player of the match: Haider Ali (Overseas Warriors)

- Bagh Stallions won the toss and elected to bat

Match 10
11 August 2021
14:00
Scorecard

Bagh Stallions; 156/9 (20 overs)	v	Rawalakot Hawks; 157/5 (18.2 overs)
Aamer Yamin 69 (34); Zaman Khan 3/18 (4 overs)		Kashif Ali 54 (40); Umaid Asif 2/27 (3 overs)

Rawalakot Hawks won by 5 wickets
Muzaffarabad Cricket Stadium, Muzaffarabad
Umpires: Asif Yaqoob (Pak) and Mohammad Sajid (Pak)
Player of the match: Aamer Yamin (Bagh Stallions)

- Bagh Stallions won the toss and elected to bat

Match 12
12 August 2021
10:30
Scorecard

Bagh Stallions; 213/4 (20 overs)	v	Muzaffarabad Tigers; 214/6 (18.4 overs)
Iftikhar Ahmed 86* (38); Mohammad Hafeez 2/24 (4 overs)		Sohaib Maqsood 59 (40); Aamir Sohail 2/37 (4 overs)

Muzaffarabad Tigers won by 4 wickets
Muzaffarabad Cricket Stadium, Muzaffarabad
Umpires: Mohammad Sajid (Pak) and Rashid Riaz (Pak)
Player of the match: Anwar Ali (Muzaffarabad Tigers)

- Muzaffarabad Tigers won the toss and elected to field

== Statistics ==
=== Most runs ===
Nat.	Player	Matches	Innings	Runs	Average	HS	100	50
(Pakistan)	Shan Masood	5	5	254	50.80	78	0	3
(Pakistan)	Iftikhar Ahmed	5	5	183	45.75	86*	0	2
(Pakistan)	Aamer Yamin	5	5	170	56.66	59	0	1
(Pakistan)	Asad Shafiq	5	5	119	29.75	54	0	1
(Pakistan)	Rohail Nazir	5	5	76	15.20	36	0	0

=== Most wickets ===
Nat.	Player	Matches	Overs	Wickets	Average	BBI	4w	5w
(Pakistan)	Umaid Asif	5	18.2	9	19.22	3/30	0	0
(Pakistan)	Aamer Yamin	5	19.0	6	25.16	2/31	0	0
(Pakistan)	Mohammad Imran	5	17.2	5	36.60	3/25	0	0
(Pakistan)	Mohammad Ilyas	5	19.4	5	40.00	2/37	0	0
(Pakistan)	Aamir Sohail	3	9.0	4	22.25	2/12	0	0
