= Najeebullah (disambiguation) =

Najeebullah may refer to:

- Mohammad Najibullah, Afghan politician
- Najibullah Zadran, Afghan cricketer
- Najeebullah (cricketer), Pakistani cricketer
