= Bashir Haider =

Pakistani cricketer

Personal information
- Born: 30 December 1940 (age 85); Sheikhupura, Punjab Province, British India
- Batting: Right-handed
- Bowling: Right-arm fast-medium
- Relatives: Ahmed Bashir (grandson)

Domestic team information
- Years: Team
- 1963-64 to 1970-71: Pakistan Railways

Career statistics
Competition	First-class
Matches	39
Runs scored	705
Batting average	16.02
100s/50s	0/3
Top score	78
Balls bowled	4705
Wickets	78
Bowling average	28.15
5 wickets in innings	1
10 wickets in match	0
Best bowling	5/76
Catches/stumpings	16/–
- Source: Cricinfo, 26 February 2022

Bashir Haider (born 30 December 1940) is a former Pakistani cricketer. A fast-medium bowler for the Pakistan Railways team, he played first-class cricket from 1960 to 1971.

Haider was one of the fastest bowlers in Pakistan in his time, but was inaccurate. He captained Pakistan Railways in the Ayub Trophy in 1964–65 when they inflicted the heaviest defeat in first-class cricket history: by an innings and 851 runs over Dera Ismail Khan. His best first-class figures were 5 for 76 against Lahore in the Quaid-e-Azam Trophy in 1968–69.

His grandson Ahmed Bashir is also a first-class cricketer in Pakistan.
