= Sharoon Siraj =

Pakistani cricketer (born 1997)

Personal information
- Born: 14 September 1997 (age 29); Bahawalpur, Punjab, Pakistan
- Batting: Right-handed
- Role: Batting all-rounder

Domestic team information
- Years: Team
- 2021-2022: Southern Punjab (squad no. 10)
- 2022: Bagh Stallions
- 2023-: Multan

Career statistics
Competition	FC	LA	T20
Matches	12	25	11
Runs scored	679	684	214
Batting average	37.72	29.73	23.77
100s/50s	1/6	0/6	0/1
Top score	114	67	57*
Balls bowled	237	450	–
Wickets	1	15	–
Bowling average	139.00	22.53	–
5 wickets in innings	0	0	–
10 wickets in match	0	0	–
Best bowling	1/24	4/48	–
Catches/stumpings	6/–	9/–	6/–
- Source: ESPNcricinfo, 14 October 2022

Sharoon Siraj (Punjabi and Urdu: شارون سراج; born 14 September 1997) is a Pakistani cricketer who plays for Multan. Siraj made his T20 debut for Southern Punjab against Khyber Pakhtunkhwa during the 2021–22 National T20 Cup on 10 October 2021. He made his List A for Southern Punjab against Sindh during the 2021–22 Pakistan Cup on 2 March 2022. Siraj made his first-class debut for Southern Punjab against Sindh during the 2022-23 Quaid-e-Azam Trophy on 9 October 2022.
