= Aaliyan Mehmood =

Pakistani cricketer (born 2004)

Aaliyan Mahmood
Personal information
- Born: 25 December 2004 (age 21); Karachi, Sindh, Pakistan
- Batting: Right-handed
- Bowling: Right-arm off break
- Role: Bowler

Domestic team information
- Years: Team
- 2020/21–2022/23: Sindh
- 2023/24: Karachi Whites
- 2024/25: Higher Education Commission

Career statistics
Competition	FC	LA
Matches	7	10
Runs scored	52	39
Batting average	6.50	7.80
100s/50s	0/0	0/0
Top score	33	24
Balls bowled	1,251	258
Wickets	22	3
Bowling average	39.50	105.00
5 wickets in innings	0	0
10 wickets in match	0	0
Best bowling	4/89	1/12
Catches/stumpings	1/–	2/–
- Source: Cricinfo, 20 November 2025

Aaliyan Mahmood (born 25 December 2004) is a Pakistani cricketer. He made his List A debut on 8 January 2021, for Sindh, in the 2020–21 Pakistan Cup. He has also played for the Pakistan Under-16 team.
