= Akhtar Shah =

Pakistani cricketer (born 2002)

Personal information
- Born: 1 January 2002 (age 24)
- Batting: Right-handed
- Bowling: Right-arm medium
- Role: Bowler

Domestic team information
- Years: Team
- 2020–21: Balochistan
- Source: Cricinfo, 15 October 2020

Akhtar Shah (born 1 January 2002) is a Pakistani cricketer. He made his Twenty20 debut on 15 October 2020, for Balochistan in the 2020–21 National T20 Cup. He made his first-class debut on 25 October 2020, also for Balochistan, in the 2020–21 Quaid-e-Azam Trophy.

The young fast bowler has played for the Pakistan Under-19 team and calls former Pakistan speedster Shoaib Akhtar his inspiration.
