= Abdul Rehman (coach) =

Pakistani cricket coach

Personal information
- Born: 1 January 1970 (age 56); Quetta, Balochistan, Pakistan
- Batting: Right-handed
- Bowling: Right-arm medium-fast
- Role: Bowler

Domestic team information
- Years: Team
- 2005/06: Quetta

Career statistics
Competition	First-class
Matches	1
Runs scored	4
Batting average	4.00
100s/50s	0/0
Top score	2*
Balls bowled	150
Wickets	2
Bowling average	39.00
5 wickets in innings	0
10 wickets in match	0
Best bowling	1/32
Catches/stumpings	0/–
- Source: CricketArchive, 28 March 2022

Abdul Rehman (Urdu: عبدالرّحمٰن; born 1970) is a Pakistani cricket coach and former cricketer, who is currently serving as the head coach of the Khyber Pakhtunkhwa cricket team in domestic cricket and assistant coach of the Pindiz in the Pakistan Super league. Abdul Rehman served as the head coach of the Multan Sultans in PSL 2024 & 2025. He served as the interim coach of the Pakistan cricket team for a series against Afghanistan.

== Early life and education ==
Abdul Rehman was born in 1970 in Quetta, Baluchistan. He holds a master's degree in international relations.

== Career ==
As a cricketer, Abdul Rehman represented Pakistan in a cricket match against Sri Lanka A in 1989 and against Australian Academy in 1995–96.

Abdul Rehman started his coaching career in 2010-2011 cricket season.

In 2017-2018 cricket season, Abdul Rehman briefly coached the Pakistan A cricket team.

In March 2023, Abdul Rehman was named as the head coach of the Pakistan national cricket team for the T20I series against Afghanistan. Previously, he worked as a coach for Peshawar Panthers and under his tenure the team won National T20 Cup in 2015 and 2016. In 2017, he was the assistant coach of Peshawar Zalmi when they won the 2017 Pakistan Super League title. He has also served as the head coach of the Khyber Pakhtunkhwa cricket team and assistant coach of Multan Sultans. After having served as the team's assistant coach for five years Abdul Rehman was appointed as the new head coach of Multan Sultans. Abdul Rehman served as the head coach of the Multan Sultans in PSL 9 (2024) & PSL 10 (2025), replacing Andy Flower. He is currently the assistant coach of the Pakistan Super League franchise Pindiz.
