= Mohammad Taha (cricketer) =

Pakistani cricketer (born 2000)

Personal information
- Full name: Mohammad Taha Khan
- Born: 5 October 2000 (age 26); Karachi, Sindh, Pakistan
- Batting: Left-handed
- Bowling: Slow left arm orthodox
- Role: Batsman

Domestic team information
- Years: Team
- 2020–2021: Sindh
- 2022: Karachi Kings (squad no. 90)
- Source: Cricinfo, 15 October 2020

Mohammad Taha (born 5 October 2000) is a Pakistani cricketer. He made his Twenty20 debut on 15 October 2020, for Sindh in the 2020–21 National T20 Cup. Prior to his Twenty20 debut, he was named in Pakistan's squad for the 2018 Under-19 Cricket World Cup. In October 2021, he was named in the Pakistan Shaheens squad for their tour of Sri Lanka. He made his List A debut on 11 November 2021, for the Pakistan Shaheens against the Sri Lanka A cricket team. He made his first-class debut on 6 November 2021, for Sindh in the 2021–22 Quaid-e-Azam Trophy.
