= Niaz Khan (cricketer) =

Pakistani cricketer

Personal information
- Born: 12 December 2001 (age 24); Swat, North-West Frontier Province, Pakistan
- Batting: Right-handed
- Bowling: Right-arm medium-fast

Domestic team information
- Years: Team
- 2021/22–2022/23: Khyber Pakhtunkhwa
- 2023/24–present: Peshawar

Career statistics
Competition	FC	LA	T20
Matches	42	14	10
Runs scored	889	130	32
Batting average	15.59	18.57	10.66
100s/50s	0/3	0/0	0/0
Top score	86	40	11*
Balls bowled	6,742	474	198
Wickets	136	10	12
Bowling average	27.25	46.70	23.16
5 wickets in innings	6	0	0
10 wickets in match	1	–	–
Best bowling	6/97	3/34	3/30
Catches/stumpings	13/–	2/–	3/–
- Source: Cricinfo, 26 January 2026

Niaz Khan (born 12 December 2001) is a Pakistani cricketer who has played first-class cricket for Peshawar since the 2023–24 season.

Khan was born in Swat. A right-arm medium-fast bowler and useful tail-end batsman, he took 5 for 53 on his first-class debut for Khyber Pakhtunkhwa in the 2021–22 Quaid-e-Azam Trophy. Representing Peshawar from the 2023–24 season in the revamped Quaid-e-Azam Trophy, he was the competition's leading wicket-taker when Peshawar finished second in 2024–25, with 39 wickets at an average of 20.13. In the final he took 5 for 61 and 4 for 51 when Peshawar lost by one wicket to Sialkot. He won the award for the player of the tournament.
