= Mohammad Amir Khan (cricketer) =

Pakistani cricketer (born 2001)

Personal information
- Born: 9 September 2001 (age 25); Swat, Khyber Pakhtunkhwa, Pakistan
- Height: 5 ft 10 in (178 cm)
- Batting: Right-handed
- Bowling: Right-arm medium-fast
- Role: Bowler

Domestic team information
- Years: Team
- 2020: Peshawar Zalmi
- 2024: Karachi Kings
- 2026: Rawalpindiz

Career statistics
Competition	T20
Matches	4
Runs scored	7
Batting average	–
100s/50s	0/0
Top score	7*
Balls bowled	72
Wickets	3
Bowling average	35.66
5 wickets in innings	0
10 wickets in match	0
Best bowling	1/11
Catches/stumpings	1/–
- Source: ESPNcricinfo, 16 March 2020

Mohammad Amir Khan (Urdu, Pashto: محمد عامر خان; born 9 September 2001) is a Pakistani cricketer. He has played for Pakistan national under-19 cricket team and represents Khyber Pakhtunkhwa in domestic cricket.

== Domestic career ==
In December 2019, he was drafted by the Pakistan Super League (PSL) franchise Peshawar Zalmi in Emerging category during the 2020 PSL draft.

He made his Twenty20 debut on 22 February 2020, for Peshawar Zalmi in the 2020 Pakistan Super League.

He made his List A debut on 22 January 2021, for Khyber Pakhtunkhwa, in the 2020–21 Pakistan Cup.

He made his first-class debut on 20 October 2021, for Khyber Pakhtunkhwa in the 2021–22 Quaid-e-Azam Trophy.
