= Pakistani cricket team against Afghanistan in the UAE in 2022–23 =

International cricket tour

Pakistani cricket team against Afghanistan in UAE in 2022–23
	Afghanistan	Pakistan
- Dates: 24 – 27 March 2023
Captains	Rashid Khan	Shadab Khan

Twenty20 International series
- Results: Afghanistan won the 3-match series 2–1
Most runs	Rahmanullah Gurbaz (78)	Imad Wasim (95)
Most wickets	Fazalhaq Farooqi (5)	Ihsanullah (6)
- Player of the series: Mohammad Nabi (Afg)

The Pakistan cricket team toured the United Arab Emirates (UAE) in March 2023 to play three Twenty20 International (T20I) matches against the Afghanistan cricket team. This was the first bilateral series in any format of international cricket between the two teams.

In November 2022, the Afghanistan Cricket Board (ACB) signed a five-year agreement with the Emirates Cricket Board (ECB) to play their home matches in the UAE. On 7 March 2023, the ACB confirmed the dates for the tour, with the matches scheduled to be played on 25, 27 and 29 March 2023. However, two days later, changes were made to the schedule due to the availability of the Hawk-Eye technology.

Afghanistan won the first T20I by 6 wickets. It was Afghanistan's first win in international cricket against Pakistan. They also went on to win the second T20I by 7 wickets and took an unassailable lead in the series. It was Afghanistan's first bilateral series win over Pakistan, and their first bilateral T20I series victory against any of the top six teams. (Note: At that time, top six teams were Australia, England, India, New Zealand, Pakistan, and South Africa.) Pakistan won the third T20I by 66 runs.

== Background ==
Originally, Afghanistan were scheduled to play three ODI matches each against Australia and Pakistan, with the series being part of 2020–2023 ICC Cricket World Cup Super League. On 12 January 2023, Cricket Australia (CA) withdrew from ODI series against Afghanistan on the grounds of restrictions on women and girls' education and employment in Afghanistan. Australia forfeited the series and the 30 competition points were awarded to Afghanistan.

This series was originally scheduled to take place in 2021 but was postponed following the Taliban takeover of Afghanistan. On 23 January 2023, Both ACB and Pakistan Cricket Board (PCB) agreed to play three T20Is instead of ODIs as both were already qualified for the 2023 Cricket World Cup.

== Squads ==
Afghanistan	Pakistan
Rashid Khan (c); Fareed Ahmad; Noor Ahmad; Sharafuddin Ashraf; Sediqullah Atal; Fazalhaq Farooqi; Usman Ghani; Rahmanullah Gurbaz (wk); Karim Janat; Mohammad Nabi; Gulbadin Naib; Naveen-ul-Haq; Azmatullah Omarzai; Mujeeb Ur Rahman; Ibrahim Zadran; Najibullah Zadran; Afsar Zazai	Shadab Khan (c); Iftikhar Ahmed; Faheem Ashraf; Saim Ayub; Mohammad Haris (wk); Ihsanullah; Azam Khan (wk); Zaman Khan; Shan Masood; Mohammad Nawaz; Abdullah Shafique; Naseem Shah; Tayyab Tahir; Imad Wasim; Mohammad Wasim

For the series, Pakistan decided to rest their regular captain Babar Azam, Shaheen Afridi, Haris Rauf, Mohammad Rizwan, and Fakhar Zaman, with Shadab Khan being named as captain.

Following an erroneous announcement appointing Pakistan's batting coach Mohammad Yousuf as their new interim head coach, Yousuf opted out of the tour citing personal reasons.

== T20I series ==
=== 1st T20I ===
24 March 2023
20:00 (N)
Scorecard

Pakistan; 92/9 (20 overs)	v	Afghanistan; 98/4 (17.5 overs)
Imad Wasim 18 (32); Mujeeb Ur Rahman 2/9 (4 overs)		Mohammad Nabi 38* (38); Ihsanullah 2/17 (3.5 overs)

Afghanistan won by 6 wickets
Sharjah Cricket Stadium, Sharjah
Umpires: Ahmed Shah Pakteen (Afg) and Bismillah Jan Shinwari (Afg)
Player of the match: Mohammad Nabi (Afg)

- Pakistan won the toss and elected to bat.
- Saim Ayub, Ihsanullah, Zaman Khan and Tayyab Tahir (Pak) all made their T20I debuts.
- Ihsanullah took a wicket in the first delivery of his T20I career.
- This was Afghanistan's first ever win against Pakistan in any format of international cricket.

=== 2nd T20I ===
26 March 2023
20:00 (N)
Scorecard

Pakistan; 130/6 (20 overs)	v	Afghanistan; 133/3 (19.5 overs)
Imad Wasim 64* (57); Fazalhaq Farooqi 2/19 (4 overs)		Rahmanullah Gurbaz 44 (49); Zaman Khan 1/22 (3.5 overs)

Afghanistan won by 7 wickets
Sharjah Cricket Stadium, Sharjah
Umpires: Ahmed Shah Pakteen (Afg) and Bismillah Jan Shinwari (Afg)
Player of the match: Fazalhaq Farooqi (Afg)

- Pakistan won the toss and elected to bat.

=== 3rd T20I ===
27 March 2023
20:00 (N)
Scorecard

Pakistan; 182/7 (20 overs)	v	Afghanistan; 116 (18.4 overs)
Saim Ayub 49 (40); Mujeeb Ur Rahman 2/28 (4 overs)		Azmatullah Omarzai 21 (20); Shadab Khan 3/13 (4 overs)

Pakistan won by 66 runs
Sharjah Cricket Stadium, Sharjah
Umpires: Ahmed Shah Pakteen (Afg) and Bismillah Jan Shinwari (Afg)
Player of the match: Shadab Khan (Pak)

- Afghanistan won the toss and elected to field.
- Sediqullah Atal (Afg) made his T20I debut.
- Shadab Khan became the first male cricketer from Pakistan to take 100 wickets in T20Is.
- Najibullah Zadran was replaced by Azmatullah Omarzai after suffering a concussion during Afghanistan's batting innings.
