= Mohammad Ali (cricketer, born 1989) =

Pakistani cricketer (born 1989)

Personal information
- Born: 12 August 1989 (age 37); Sialkot, Pakistan
- Batting: Right-handed
- Bowling: Right-arm fast medium
- Source: Cricinfo, 1 November 2015

Mohammad Ali (born 12 August 1989) is a Pakistani first-class cricketer who plays for Water and Power Development Authority.

Ali began his cricketing career at the RP Club in Sialkot. He played tape-ball cricket during his teenage years before transitioning to hardball cricket. He played first-class cricket for Pakistan Television, Sialkot and State Bank of Pakistan.
