= Abdul Bangalzai =

Pakistani cricketer

Abdul Wahid Bangalzai
Personal information
- Full name: Abdul Wahid Bangalzai
- Born: 4 March 2003 (age 23); Quetta, Balochistan, Pakistan
- Batting: Right-handed
- Bowling: Right-arm off-break
- Role: Batsman

Domestic team information
- Years: Team
- 2020/21–present: Balochistan
- 2022: Quetta Gladiators (squad no. 11)
- Source: ESPNcricinfo, 3 February 2022

Abdul Bangalzai (born 4 March 2003) is a Pakistani cricketer.

== Early career ==
Bangalzai was born in Quetta into a poor family, his father being a truck worker who had to borrow money to buy his first white playing kit, Bangalzai often going to bed without having dinner, but due to the PCB's Pathways Programme, providing financial help as well educational scholarship and elite coaching, Bangulzai could continue his professional cricket career at Under-19 level.

In December 2019, due to his performances, he was named in Pakistan's squad for the 2020 Under-19 Cricket World Cup.

== Domestic career ==
In October 2020, Bangalzai made his Twenty20 debut for Balochistan in the 2020–21 National T20 Cup.

In January 2021, he was named in Balochistan's squad for the 2020–21 Pakistan Cup. He made his List A debut on 8 January 2021, for Balochistan, in the 2020–21 Pakistan Cup, opening the innings and scoring 36 runs to help his team to a comfortable win in pursuit of 285 runs.

In October 2021, he made his first-class debut for Balochistan in the 2021–22 Quaid-e-Azam Trophy.

In November 2021, in his third first-class match, he hit his maiden double-century, his unbeaten 203 also being the first double-century from a Balochistan cricketer.

In December 2021, he was named in Pakistan's team for the 2022 ICC Under-19 Cricket World Cup in the West Indies. However, the following month he was ruled out of the tournament after testing positive for COVID-19. The same month, he played in the 2021 ACC Under-19 Asia Cup.

In March 2022, in the 2021–22 Pakistan Cup, Bangalzai scored his first century in List A cricket, with an unbeaten 136 runs against Sindh.
