= Tayyab Tahir =

Pakistani cricketer (born 1993)

Personal information
- Born: 26 July 1993 (age 33); Sarai Alamgir Tehsil, Punjab, Pakistan
- Height: 5 ft 7 in (170 cm)
- Batting: Right-handed
- Bowling: Leg break
- Role: Middle-order batter

International information
- National side: Pakistan (2023–2025)
- ODI debut (cap 249): 26 November 2024 v Zimbabwe
- Last ODI: 5 April 2025 v New Zealand
- ODI shirt no.: 66
- T20I debut (cap 102): 24 March 2023 v Afghanistan
- Last T20I: 13 December 2024 v South Africa
- T20I shirt no.: 66

Domestic team information
- Years: Team
- 2020/21: Central Punjab
- 2021–2023: Southern Punjab (squad no. 99)
- 2023: Karachi Kings
- 2023/24–present: Lahore Whites (squad no. 66)
- 2024-2025: Multan Sultans
- 2026: Lahore Qalandars
- 2026: Nottinghamshire

Career statistics
Competition	ODI	T20I	FC	LA
Matches	11	8	80	98
Runs scored	181	123	4,378	3,764
Batting average	22.62	20.50	33.67	41.82
100s/50s	0/0	0/0	9/22	7/22
Top score	38	39*	221	169
Balls bowled	–	–	269	1
Wickets	–	–	4	0
Bowling average	–	–	48.00	–
5 wickets in innings	–	–	0	–
10 wickets in match	–	–	0	–
Best bowling	–	–	1/0	–
Catches/stumpings	4/–	4/–	62/–	42/–
- Source: Cricinfo, 23 August 2026

Tayyab Tahir (born 26 July 1993) is a Pakistani cricketer who plays for Lahore Whites and the Pakistan national team.

== Early life and career ==
Born in the village of Thoon near Sarai Alamgir in Pakistan's Punjab province, Tayyab played tape ball cricket before getting into professional cricket in 2007. At the age of 14, he moved to Lahore after being encouraged by his uncle and his father, joining the city's P&T Gymkhana cricket club and playing with former international all-rounder Abdul Razzaq, later making his domestic debut across all formats in 2015.

== Domestic career ==
In December 2018, in his debut T20 innings, Tayyab hit a half-century for Lahore Whites against Peshawar, during the 2018–19 National T20 Cup.

In January 2021, he was named in Central Punjab's squad for the 2020–21 Pakistan Cup. Following the conclusion of the competition, he was named as the batsman of the tournament.

In October 2021, in the second round of the 2021–22 Quaid-e-Azam Trophy, he scored his maiden century in first-class cricket.

In December 2022, ahead of the 2023 PSL, he was picked by the PSL franchise Karachi Kings. This would be his first participation in the Pakistan Super League. In the 14th match of the tournament, playing against Multan Sultans, he made his PSL debut and also got his maiden PSL half-century.

== International career ==
In January 2023, Tayyab earned his maiden call for the national squad, named in the One Day International (ODI) squad for the New Zealand tour of Pakistan. He didn't play any of the three ODIs. Before his selection he played club cricket in England for some three years.

In March 2023, he was named in Pakistan's Twenty20 International (T20I) squad for the series against Afghanistan. He made his T20I debut in the first T20I of the series, on 24 March 2023.
