= Asif Mahmood =

Pakistani cricketer (born 1975)

Personal information
- Born: 18 December 1975 (age 50); Rawalpindi
- Batting: Right-handed
- Bowling: Right-arm offbreak

Career statistics
Competition	ODI
Matches	2
Runs scored	14
Batting average	7.00
100s/50s	0/0
Top score	14
Catches/stumpings	0/–
- Source: , 3 May 2006

Raja Asif Mahmood (Urdu: راجہ آصف محمود, born 18 December 1975) is a Pakistani cricketer who played two ODIs in 1998. A batsman, he managed only 14 runs in his two appearances, and was subsequently dropped. He was born at Rawalpindi.
