= Taj Wali =

Pakistani cricketer

Personal information
- Born: 21 March 1991 (age 35); Peshawar, Pakistan
- Batting: Left-handed
- Bowling: Left-arm medium-fast
- Role: Bowler

Domestic team information
- Years: Team
- 2011-2015: Peshawar Panthers
- 2011-present: Khyber Pakthunkhwa Province
- 2016-present: Peshawar Zalmi
- 2017–2018: Peshawar
- 2018: Sindh
- 2019–present: Balochistan
- Source: Cricinfo, 20 November 2015

Taj Wali (born 21 March 1991) is a Pakistani cricketer, who plays mainly as a fast-medium bowler. In the 2015–16 Quaid-e-Azam Trophy, he became the first bowler in more than 20 years to take four wickets in four balls in first-class domestic cricket in Pakistan.

In round four of the 2017–18 Quaid-e-Azam Trophy, playing for Peshawar, he dismissed Mohammad Irfan by Mankad. He was the leading wicket-taker for Peshawar in the 2017–18 Quaid-e-Azam Trophy, with 34 dismissals in six matches. He was also the leading wicket-taker for Peshawar in the 2018–19 Quaid-e-Azam Trophy, with 36 dismissals in seven matches.

In April 2018, he was named in Sindh's squad for the 2018 Pakistan Cup. In March 2019, he was named in Balochistan's squad for the 2019 Pakistan Cup. In September 2019, he was named in Balochistan's squad for the 2019–20 Quaid-e-Azam Trophy tournament. In January 2021, he was named in Balochistan's squad for the 2020–21 Pakistan Cup.
