= Yousuf Babar =

Pakistani cricketer (born 1997)

Personal information
- Born: 10 December 1997 (age 28); Renala Khurd, Punjab, Pakistan
- Batting: Right-handed
- Source: Cricinfo, 14 October 2018

Yousuf Babar (born 10 December 1997) is a Pakistani cricketer. He made his List A debut for Multan in the 2018–19 Quaid-e-Azam One Day Cup on 30 September 2018. He made his first-class debut for Multan in the 2018–19 Quaid-e-Azam Trophy on 11 October 2018. He made his Twenty20 debut on 10 October 2021, for Southern Punjab in the 2021–22 National T20 Cup.
