= Umar Siddiq =

Pakistani cricketer (born 1992)

Personal information
- Full name: Umar Siddiq Khan
- Born: 30 December 1992 (age 33); Lahore, Punjab, Pakistan
- Batting: Left-handed
- Bowling: Right-arm offbreak

Domestic team information
- Years: Team
- 2012-2015: Lahore Whites
- 2016: Islamabad United
- 2018–2019: Multan Sultans
- 2019–2023: Southern Punjab
- Source: Cricinfo, 18 December 2015

Umar Siddiq (born 30 December 1992) is a Pakistani cricketer who plays for United Bank Limited. In March 2019, he was named in Sindh's squad for the 2019 Pakistan Cup. In September 2019, he was named in Southern Punjab's squad for the 2019–20 Quaid-e-Azam Trophy tournament.
