= Najeebullah (cricketer) =

Pakistani cricketer (born 1991)

Personal information
- Full name: Najeebullah Achakzai
- Born: 1 January 1991 (age 35)

Domestic team information
- Years: Team
- 2020–21: Balochistan
- Source: Cricinfo, 10 October 2020

Najeebullah (born 1 January 1991) is a Pakistani cricketer. He made his List A debut on 16 January 2011, for the Lahore Lions in the 2010–11 One Day National Cup. He made his Twenty20 debut on 22 September 2014, also for the Lahore Lions, in the 2014–15 Haier T20 Cup. In October 2020, he was named in Balochistan's squad for the 2020–21 Quaid-e-Azam Trophy. He made his first-class debut on 3 November 2021, for Balochistan in the 2021–22 Quaid-e-Azam Trophy.
