= Ashfaq Ahmed (Peshawar cricketer) =

Pakistani cricketer (born 1987)

Personal information
- Born: 22 April 1987 (age 39); Charsadda, Pakistan
- Source: Cricinfo, 16 December 2015

Ashfaq Ahmed (born 22 April 1987) is a Pakistani first-class cricketer who plays for Peshawar. In April 2018, he was named in Punjab's squad for the 2018 Pakistan Cup. In September 2019, he was named in Khyber Pakhtunkhwa's squad for the 2019–20 Quaid-e-Azam Trophy tournament.
