= Ahsan Ali (cricketer) =

Pakistani cricketer

Personal information
- Born: 10 December 1993 (age 32); Karachi, Sindh, Pakistan
- Batting: Right-handed
- Bowling: Leg-break
- Role: Batsman

International information
- National side: Pakistan
- T20I debut (cap 85): 24 January 2020 v Bangladesh
- Last T20I: 25 January 2020 v Bangladesh

Domestic team information
- Years: Team
- 2019–2023: Quetta Gladiators
- 2026: Quetta Gladiators

Career statistics
Competition	T20I
Matches	2
Runs scored	36
Batting average	18.00
100s/50s	0/0
Top score	36
Catches/stumpings	0/–
- Source: Cricinfo, 26 September 2021

Ahsan Ali (Urdu: احسن علی, born 10 December 1993) is a Pakistani cricketer. He made his international debut for the Pakistan cricket team in January 2020.

== Career ==
He made his first-class debut for United Bank Limited in the 2013–14 President's Trophy on 13 December 2013. In March 2019, he was named in Sindh's squad for the 2019 Pakistan Cup. In October 2019, the Pakistan Cricket Board (PCB) named him as one of the six players to watch ahead of the 2019–20 National T20 Cup tournament.

In January 2020, he was named in Pakistan's Twenty20 International (T20I) squad for their series against Bangladesh. He made his T20I debut for Pakistan, against Bangladesh, on 24 January 2020.

In November 2021, during the fourth round of the 2021–22 Quaid-e-Azam Trophy, he became the ninth batsman to score a triple century in the Quaid-e-Azam Trophy, when he made 303 not out in Sindh's match against Central Punjab.
