= Ali Zaryab =

Pakistani cricketer (born 1998)

Personal information
- Full name: Ali Zaryab Asif
- Born: 27 December 1998 (age 27); Lahore, Punjab, Pakistan
- Batting: Left-handed
- Bowling: Right arm off break

Domestic team information
- Years: Team
- 2017–18: Lahore Blues
- 2018–19, 2023/24–present: Lahore Whites (squad no. 10)
- 2021: Central Punjab
- Source: Cricinfo, 10 October 2017

Ali Zaryab Asif (born 27 December 1998) is a Pakistani cricketer.

== Career ==
Ali Zaryab began his cricket training at Shafqat Rana Cricket Academy in 2009 and joined Paragon Academy in 2010. He played regional Under-16 cricket for Lahore in the 2012/13 season and scored a century in the 2014 two-day tournament.

His under-16 performances led to his inclusion in the NCA Colts Under-19 side, where he played both Under-16 and Under-19 regional games. He scored 180 runs in a district-level Under-19 game and three centuries in the Inter Region Under-19 Three Day Tournament 2015/16. He was also a reserve player for the 2016 Under-19 Cricket World Cup.

In the ACC Under-19s Asia Cup 2016/17, Ali served as vice-captain and was the leading run-scorer in the Inter Region Under-19 One Day Tournament 2016/17, with 339 runs at an average of 113.

He made his first-class debut for Lahore Blues in the 2017–18 Quaid-e-Azam Trophy on 9 October 2017.

In December 2017, he was named in Pakistan's squad for the 2018 Under-19 Cricket World Cup. He was the leading run-scorer for Pakistan in the tournament, with 164 runs. He made his List A debut for Lahore Whites in the 2018–19 Quaid-e-Azam One Day Cup on 6 September 2018. In January 2021, he was named in Central Punjab's squad for the 2020–21 Pakistan Cup.
