= Mubasir Khan =

Pakistani cricketer (born 2002)

Personal information
- Full name: Mubasir Khan
- Born: 24 April 2002 (age 24); Rawalpindi, Punjab, Pakistan
- Height: 1.86 m (6 ft 1 in)
- Batting: Right-handed
- Bowling: Right-arm off-break
- Role: Batting all-rounder

International information
- National side: Pakistan (2023)
- Only T20I (cap 110): 7 October 2023 v Bangladesh

Domestic team information
- Years: Team
- 2020/21–present: Northern (squad no. 53)
- 2022-2023: Islamabad United (squad no. 53)
- 2026: Rawalpindiz (squad no. 53)

Career statistics
Competition	T20I	First-class	List A	T20
Matches	1	44	56	53
Runs scored	–	2,237	1,405	568
Batting average	–	42.20	31.22	16.70
100s/50s	0/0	4/14	3/5	0/0
Top score	–	170*	118*	45
Balls bowled	–	6,077	2,395	465
Wickets	–	95	48	20
Bowling average	–	32.83	44.79	30.10
5 wickets in innings	0	3	0	0
10 wickets in match	0	0	0	0
Best bowling	–	6/43	4/51	3/19
Catches/stumpings	0/–	20/–	18/–	23/–
- Source: Cricinfo, 21 October 2025

Mubasir Khan (born 24 April 2002) is a Pakistani cricketer who plays for Rawalpindiz.

== Early career ==
Mubasir was born in Rawalpindi into a family involved in sports, his father being a former field hockey player while his elder brother Imran Khan has played cricket for Rawalpindi's U16 and U19 squads. His father encouraged him to go into cricket as well, which Mubasir began to take seriously in 2016, when he joined Asif Bajwa's academy, where Mohammad Amir also trained. Mubasir would then excel at U19 level before playing first-class cricket after being spotted by Northern's head coach Mohammad Wasim.

== Domestic career ==
In December 2020, he made his first-class debut for Northern, in the 2020–21 Quaid-e-Azam Trophy. In the second innings of the match, he scored his maiden century in first-class cricket, with 164 runs. The same month, he was shortlisted as one of the Men's Emerging Cricketer of the Year for the 2020 PCB Awards.

In January 2021, he was named in Northern's squad for the 2020–21 Pakistan Cup. He made his List A debut during the tournament.

In December 2021, he was signed by Islamabad United following the players' draft for the 2022 Pakistan Super League.

In December 2021, following the conclusion of the 2021–22 Quaid-e-Azam Trophy, he was named as the player of the tournament.
