= Mohammad Huraira =

Pakistani cricketer (born 2002)

Personal information
- Born: 25 April 2002 (age 24); Sialkot, Punjab, Pakistan
- Batting: Right-handed
- Role: Batsman
- Relatives: Shoaib Malik (uncle)

International information
- National side: Pakistan (2025–present)
- Test debut (cap 258): 17 January 2025 v West Indies
- Last Test: 25 January 2025 v West Indies

Domestic team information
- Years: Team
- 2021/22–2023: Northern
- 2022: Islamabad United

Career statistics
Competition	Test	FC	LA	T20
Matches	2	48	26	23
Runs scored	46	3,512	658	531
Batting average	11.50	45.02	28.60	27.94
100s/50s	0/0	8/15	1/1	0/3
Top score	29	311	100*	86*
Catches/stumpings	2/–	38/–	16/–	8/–
- Source: Cricinfo, 25 April 2025

Mohammad Huraira (born 25 April 2002) is a Pakistani cricketer. He made his first-class debut on 20 October 2021, for Northern in the 2021–22 Quaid-e-Azam Trophy. Prior to his first-class debut, he was named in Pakistan's squad for the 2020 Under-19 Cricket World Cup. He made his test debut on 17 January 2025 against the West Indies at the Multan cricket stadium.

== Domestic career ==
In the tenth and final round of the 2021–22 Quaid-e-Azam Trophy, Huraira scored his maiden double century in first-class cricket, before converting it into his maiden triple century. He became the second-youngest batter to score a triple century in a domestic first-class match in Pakistan. He made his Twenty20 debut on 20 February 2022, for Islamabad United in the 2022 Pakistan Super League.

== International career ==
In June 2023, he received his first international call-up for Pakistan's Test squad for the away series against Sri Lanka. In August 2024, he was selected in Pakistan's test squad against Bangladesh. In December 2024, he was named in Pakistan's squad for test match series against West Indies. He made his test debut on 17 January 2025 against West Indies in Multan. He scored 35 runs across two innings of the Test match.
