= Ahmed Bashir =

Pakistani cricketer (born 1995)

Personal information
- Born: 10 December 1995 (age 30); Vehari, Punjab, Pakistan
- Height: 5 ft 11 in (180 cm)
- Batting: Right-handed
- Bowling: Right-arm Medium
- Role: Bowler
- Relatives: Bashir Haider (grandfather)
- Source: ESPNcricinfo, 5 November 2016

Ahmed Bashir (born 10 December 1995) is a Pakistani cricketer.

== Domestic career ==
He made his first-class debut for Lahore Eagles in the 2014–15 Quaid-e-Azam Trophy on 12 November 2014. In September 2019, he was named in Central Punjab's squad for the 2019–20 Quaid-e-Azam Trophy tournament. In January 2021, he was named in Central Punjab's squad for the 2020–21 Pakistan Cup.
