= Athar Mahmood (cricketer) =

Pakistani cricketer (born 1999)

Personal information
- Born: 25 June 1999 (age 27); Sialkot, Punjab, Pakistan
- Batting: Right-handed
- Bowling: Right-arm medium
- Role: Bowler
- Relatives: Hasan Ali (cousin)

Domestic team information
- Years: Team
- 2017–18: Pakistan Television
- 2021-2023: Northern (squad no. 98)
- Source: Cricinfo, 4 October 2017

Athar Mahmood (born 25 June 1999) is a Pakistani cricketer. He made his first-class debut for Pakistan Television in the 2017–18 Quaid-e-Azam Trophy on 3 October 2017. He made his List A debut for Pakistan Television in the 2017–18 Departmental One Day Cup on 28 December 2017. In January 2021, he was named in Northern's squad for the 2020–21 Pakistan Cup. He made his Twenty20 debut on 11 October 2021, for Northern in the 2021–22 National T20 Cup.

In December 2021, he was signed by Islamabad United following the players' draft for the 2022 Pakistan Super League.

== Personal life ==
He is a cousin of fellow fast bowler Hasan Ali.
