= Ghulam Mudassar =

Pakistani cricketer (born 1999)

Personal information
- Born: 24 October 1999 (age 25); Karachi, Sindh, Pakistan
- Batting: Right-handed
- Bowling: Left-arm fast-medium
- Role: Bowler

Domestic team information
- Years: Team
- 2017–2018: Lahore Qalandars
- 2019; 2022: Quetta Gladiators
- Source: Cricinfo, 21 December 2015

Ghulam Mudassar (born 24 October 1999) is a Pakistani cricketer who plays for Karachi. Hailing from a modest background in the volatile neighborhood of Lyari in Karachi, he is a left-arm fast-medium bowler who looks up to Wasim Akram and Aqib Javed. He made his first-class debut on 9 November 2015 in the 2015–16 Quaid-e-Azam Trophy. He made his Twenty20 debut on 10 September 2016 for Peshawar in the 2016–17 National T20 Cup. He made his Pakistan Super League (PSL) debut playing for Lahore Qalandars against Peshawar Zalmi in the 2017 PSL.

He was the leading wicket-taker for Baluchistan in the 2017 Pakistan Cup, with seven dismissals in four matches. He was also the leading wicket-taker for National Bank of Pakistan in the 2018–19 Quaid-e-Azam One Day Cup, with fifteen dismissals in eight matches.

In December 2018, he was named in Pakistan's team for the 2018 ACC Emerging Teams Asia Cup. In March 2019, he was named in Baluchistan's squad for the 2019 Pakistan Cup.
