= Waleed Yaqub =

Pakistani cricket umpire (born 1974)

Personal information
- Born: 5 February 1974 (age 52)

Umpiring information
- Source: Cricinfo, 30 April 2018

Waleed Yaqub (born 5 February 1974) is a Pakistani cricket umpire. He has stood in domestic matches in the 2017–18 Quaid-e-Azam Trophy and the Departmental and Regional one-day cups.
