= Sindh cricket team =

Domestic and International cricket team of Sind

Personnel
- Captain: Sarfaraz Ahmed
- Coach: Basit Ali
- Owner: Sindh Cricket Association

Team information
- Colours: Orange Yellow
- Founded: 2019; 7 years ago
- Dissolved: 2023; 3 years ago
- Home ground: National Stadium, Karachi
- Secondary home ground(s): Niaz Stadium, Hyderabad

History
- Quaid-e-Azam Trophy wins: 0
- Pakistan Cup wins: 0
- National T20 Cup wins: 1 (2022/23)
First-class
List A / T20

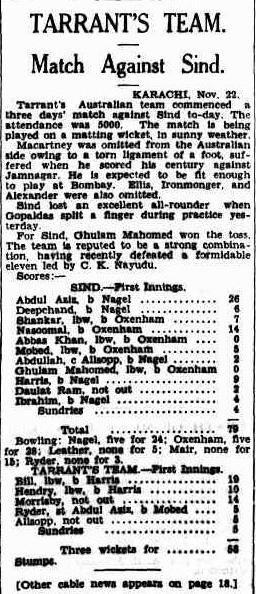
Figure 1: The match held between Sindh & Australia in Karachi on 22 November 1935 was reported by The Sydney Morning Herald

Sindh cricket team was a domestic cricket team in Pakistan representing Sindh province. It competed in domestic first-class, List A and T20 cricket competitions, namely the Quaid-e-Azam Trophy, Pakistan Cup and National T20 Cup. The team was operated by the Sindh Cricket Association.

== History ==
=== Before 2019 ===
Sindh played its first first-class game in December 1932, when they drew with Ceylon at the Karachi Gymkhana ground in Karachi. On 22 November 1935 Sindh and Australia played a three-day match - Figure 1. The match was seen by 5,000 Karachiites. The team played its inaugural season in the Ranji Trophy in 1934. From 1934–35 until 1947–48 Sindh participated in the Ranji Trophy. On 27 December 1947 Sindh hosted the first first-class game to be played in Pakistan, but were defeated by an innings and 68 runs by Punjab. The greatest Sindh player in the Ranji Trophy period was Naoomal Jeoomal who played in India's first test match against England at Lord's in 1932. Jeoomal became coach of the Pakistan cricket team in 1960. In Pakistani domestic cricket, Sindh played in the Quaid-e-Azam Trophy each season from 1953–54 to 1956–57, but then made only sporadic appearances at first-class level until the 1970s, when two Sindh teams (Sind A and Sind B) competed in the Quaid-e-Azam Trophy for several years; the province also played List A cricket. Until 2019, Sindh's last first-class match under that name was a seven-wicket loss in January 1979 against Habib Bank Limited. After that, a "Sind Governor's XI" played three games in the 1980s and one in 2000, while a "Rest of Sindh" team took part in the 2001–02 Quaid-e-Azam Trophy (finishing bottom of Pool A with no wins from eight games) and One Day National Tournament.

=== Since 2019 ===
The team was introduced as a part of the new domestic structure announced by the Pakistan Cricket Board (PCB) on 31 August 2019.

==== Structure ====
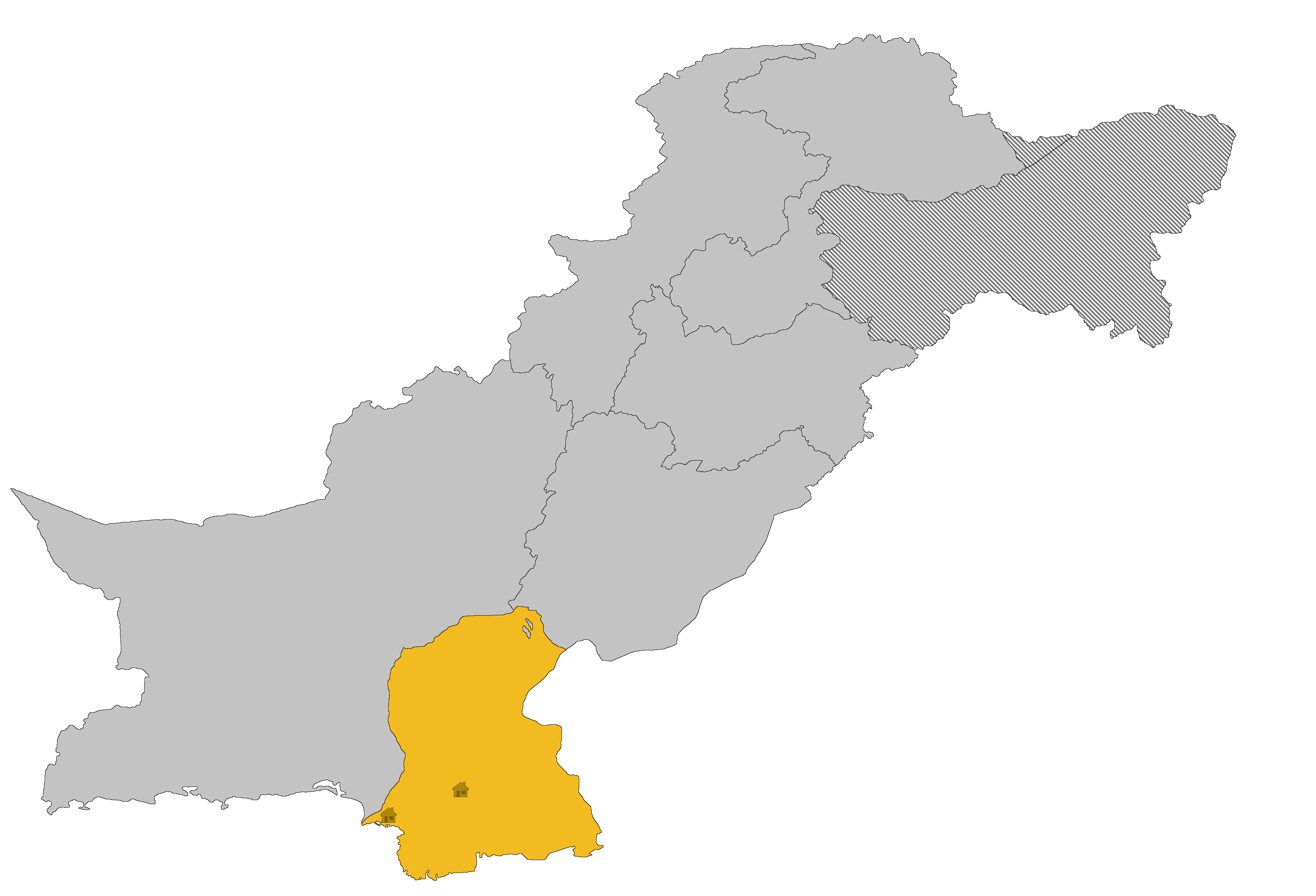
Sindh Cricket Association includes Karachi, Hyderabad and Larkana

As of 2019, domestic cricket in Pakistan was reorganised into six regional teams (on provincial lines). A three tier bottom-up system is in operation with the Tier 1 teams participating in the Quaid-e-Azam Trophy (First Class), Pakistan Cup (List A) and National T20 Cup (Regional T20). The Tier 2 teams participate in the City Cricket Association Tournament whilst the Tier 3 teams participate in various local tournaments as both tiers feed players to the Tier 1 team.

  - Tier 1: Sindh
  - Tier 2: Karachi (Zone I), Karachi (Zone II), Karachi (Zone III), Karachi (Zone IV), Karachi (Zone V), Karachi (Zone VI), Karachi (Zone VII), Hyderabad, Jamshoro, Mirpur Khas, Badin, Sanghar, Sukkur, Shikarpur, Khairpur, Larkana & Benazirabad.
  - Tier 3: Various Clubs & Schools.

== Season summaries ==
=== 2019/20 Season ===
Sindh finished in fifth place in both the Quaid-e-Azam Trophy and National T20 Cup. The Pakistan Cup was cancelled this season due to the COVID-19 pandemic.

=== 2020/21 Season ===
The team finished in sixth and third place respectively in the Quaid-e-Azam Trophy and the National T20 Cup. Although finishing first in the league phase of the Pakistan Cup, Sindh could not progress to the final in the knock-out phase of the tournament.

== See also ==
- Balochistan cricket team
- Central Punjab cricket team
- Khyber Pakhtunkhwa cricket team
- Northern cricket team
- Southern Punjab cricket team
