= 2026 Islamabad United season =

2026 season of Islamabad United

Islamabad United
2026 season
- Coach: Luke Ronchi
- Captain: Shadab Khan
- Ground(s): Rawalpindi Cricket Stadium
- Playoffs: 3rd place

The 2026 season is the eleventh season for Islamabad United in the Pakistan Super League (PSL) for men's cricket. After renewing their franchise rights for the 2026–2035 cycle, the three-time champions enter the season under new leadership and a revamped recruitment model, as the league transitioned from a draft to a player auction.

== Background ==
In late 2025, Islamabad United became the first franchise to officially renew its partnership with the PCB for another decade. The 2026 season marked the league’s expansion to eight teams and introduced a player auction system with a team purse of PKR 450 million.

== Personnel ==
=== Coaching and management staff ===
In January 2026, the franchise announced the return of former player Luke Ronchi as the head coach, replacing Mike Hesson.

- Head Coach: Luke Ronchi
- Assistant Coach: Jacob Oram
- Batting Coach: Ashley Wright
- Bowling Coach: Ian Butler
- Owner: Ali Naqvi and Amna Naqvi (Leonine Global Sports)

=== Squad ===
Before the auction on 11 February 2026, Islamabad United retained Shadab Khan, Devon Conway and Andries Gousfrom their 2025 squad. They also secured New Zealand's Devon Conway as their direct overseas signing for a reported PKR 6.3 crore (Rs. 63 million).

Key
- Players with international caps are listed in **bold**.
- * denotes a player who is fully unavailable
- * denotes a player who will be partially unavailable

No.	Name	Nationality	Birth date	Salary	Batting style	Bowling style	Year signed	Notes
Batsmen
15	Max Bryant	Australia	10 March 1999 (age 27)	PKR 1.95 crore	Right-handed	Right-arm medium	2026	
80	**Mark Chapman**	New Zealand	27 June 1994 (age 32)	PKR 7.0 crore	Left-handed	Slow left-arm orthodox	2026	
86	Sameer Minhas	Pakistan	2 October 2006 (age 20)	PKR 1.90 crore	Right-handed	Right-arm leg break	2026	
46	**Haider Ali**	Pakistan	2 October 2000 (age 26)	PKR 1.50 crore	Right-handed	—	2026	
All-rounders
7	**Shadab Khan**	Pakistan	4 October 1998 (age 28)	PKR 7.0 crore	Right-handed	Right-arm leg-break	2017	Captain, **Retained**
97	**Faheem Ashraf**	Pakistan	16 January 1993 (age 33)	PKR 8.50 crore	Left-handed	Right-arm medium-fast	2026	
45	**Dipendra Singh Airee**	Nepal	24 January 2000 (age 26)	PKR 60 lakh	Right-handed	Right-arm off-break	2026	
Wicket-keepers
88	**Devon Conway**	New Zealand	8 July 1991 (age 35)	PKR 6.30 crore	Left-handed	Right-arm medium	2026	**Directly Signed**
68	**Andries Gous**	United States	24 November 1993 (age 32)	PKR 1.4 crore	Right-handed	—	2025	**Retained**
Bowlers
99	Salman Irshad	Pakistan	3 December 1995 (age 30)	PKR 1.2 crore	Right-handed	Right-arm fast	2025	**Retained**
74	**Mohammad Wasim Jr.**	Pakistan	25 August 2001 (age 25)	PKR 4.1 crore	Right-handed	Right-arm medium-fast	2026	
11	Mehran Mumtaz	Pakistan	7 April 2003 (age 23)	PKR 1.20 crore	Left-handed	Slow left-arm orthodox	2026	
—	Mir Hamza Sajjad	Pakistan	24 June 1996 (age 30)	PKR 70 lakh	Right-handed	Right-arm fast	2026	
14	Sameen Gul	Pakistan	4 February 1999 (age 27)	PKR 60 lakh	Right-handed	Right-arm medium-fast	2026	
71	**Richard Gleeson**	England	2 December 1987 (age 38)	PKR 1.10 crore	Right-handed	Right-arm medium-fast	2026	
87	**Mohammad Hasnain**	Pakistan	5 April 2000 (age 26)	PKR 77.5 lakh	Right-handed	Right-arm fast	2026	
40	**Blessing Muzarabani**	Zimbabwe	2 October 1996 (age 30)	PKR 1.10 crore	Right-handed	Right-arm medium-fast	2026	

- Source: ESPNcricinfo

== Season standings ==
Pos	Team	Pld	W	L	NR	Pts	NRR	Qualification
1	Peshawar Zalmi (C)	10	8	1	1	17	2.324	Advanced to the Qualifier
2	Islamabad United (3rd)	10	6	3	1	13	1.667	Advanced to the Qualifier
3	Multan Sultans (4th)	10	6	4	0	12	0.326	Advanced to the Eliminator 1
4	Hyderabad Kingsmen (R)	10	5	5	0	10	−0.361	Advanced to the Eliminator 1
5	Lahore Qalandars	10	5	5	0	10	−0.482	Eliminated
6	Karachi Kings	10	5	5	0	10	−0.869	Eliminated
7	Quetta Gladiators	10	3	7	0	6	−0.410	Eliminated
8	Rawalpindiz	10	1	9	0	2	−1.760	Eliminated

Source: ESPNcricinfo

Notes

- C = Champions;
- R = Runners-up;
- (x) = Position at the end of the tournament;

== Fixtures ==
Match 4
28 March 2026
19:00 (N)
Scorecard

Islamabad United; 171/8 (20 overs)	v	Multan Sultans; 175/5 (18.4 overs)
Mark Chapman 40 (21); Momin Qamar 3/24 (3 overs)		Josh Philippe 55 (35); Salman Irshad 2/28 (4 overs)

Multan Sultans won by 5 wickets.
Gaddafi Stadium, Lahore
Umpires: Sharfuddoula (Ban) and Ahsan Raza (Pak)
Player of the match: Momin Qamar (Multan Sultans)

- Multan Sultans won the toss and elected to field.

Match 7
31 March 2026
19:00 (N)
Scorecard

Islamabad United	v	Peshawar Zalmi

Match abandoned
Gaddafi Stadium, Lahore
Umpires: Ahsan Raza (Pak) and Asif Yaqoob (Pak)

- No toss.
- No play was possible due to rain.

Match 9
2 April 2026
14:30
Scorecard

Quetta Gladiators; 183/5 (20 overs)	v	Islamabad United; 189/2 (18.2 overs)
Hasan Nawaz 66 (36); Shadab Khan 3/23 (4 overs)		Sameer Minhas 82* (48); Abrar Ahmed 2/29 (4 overs)

Islamabad United won by 8 wickets
Gaddafi Stadium, Lahore
Umpires: Alex Wharf (Eng) and Rashid Riaz (Pak)
Player of the match: Shadab Khan (Islamabad United)

- Quetta Gladiators won the toss and elected to bat.

Match 12
4 April 2026
19:00 (N)
Scorecard

Rawalpindiz; 156/7 (20 overs)	v	Islamabad United; 157/3 (14.2 overs)
Kamran Ghulam 50 (39); Richard Gleeson 2/21 (4 overs)		Sameer Minhas 70 (36); Mohammad Amir 1/18 (3 overs)

Islamabad United won by 7 wickets
Gaddafi Stadium, Lahore
Umpires: Abdul Muqeet (Pak) and Alex Wharf (Eng)
Player of the match: Sameer Minhas (Islamabad United)

- Islamabad United won the toss and elected to field.
- Mohammad Faiq (Islamabad United) made his debut in PSL.

Match 16
9 April 2026
14:30
Scorecard

Lahore Qalandars; 100 (18.3 overs)	v	Islamabad United; 104/1 (10.2 overs)
Sikandar Raza 25 (19); Chris Green 3/19 (4 overs)		Devon Conway 59* (35); Shaheen Shah Afridi 1/22 (3 overs)

Islamabad United won by 9 wickets
National Bank Stadium, Karachi
Umpires: Chris Brown (NZ) and Faisal Afridi (Pak)
Player of the match: Chris Green (Islamabad United)

- Islamabad United won the toss and elected to field.

Match 21
12 April 2026
19:00 (N)
Scorecard

Islamabad United; 153/9 (20 overs)	v	Hyderabad Kingsmen; 157/4 (18.1 overs)
Devon Conway 45 (31); Asif Mehmood 4/18 (2 overs)		Marnus Labuschagne 61* (53); Chris Green 2/19 (4 overs)

Hyderabad Kingsmen won by 6 wickets
National Bank Stadium, Karachi
Umpires: Chris Gaffaney (NZ) and Nasir Hussain (Pak)
Player of the match: Marnus Labuschagne (Hyderabad Kingsmen)

- Hyderabad Kingsmen won the toss and elected to field.

Match 25
16 April 2026
19:00 (N)
Scorecard

Karachi Kings; 150/6 (20 overs)	v	Islamabad United; 123/5 (16.3 overs)
Reeza Hendricks 51* (44); Richard Gleeson 2/22 (4 overs)		Sameer Minhas 58 (36); Moeen Ali 1/14 (2 overs)

Islamabad United won by 8 wickets
National Bank Stadium, Karachi
Umpires: Asif Yaqoob (Pak) and Chris Gaffaney (NZ)
Player of the match: Sameer Minhas (Islamabad United)

- Islamabad United won the toss and elected to field.
- Dipendra Singh Airee (Islamabad United) made his debut in PSL as a substitute player.

Match 34
23 April 2026
14:30
Scorecard

Islamabad United; 137 (20 overs)	v	Rawalpindiz; 140/4 (18.1 overs)
Devon Conway 40 (33); Dian Forrester 2/9 (1 over)		Mohammad Rizwan 45 (38); Shadab Khan 1/18 (4 overs)

Rawalpindiz won by 6 wickets
National Bank Stadium, Karachi
Umpires: Alex Wharf (Eng) and Faisal Afridi (Pak)
Player of the match: Mohammad Rizwan (Rawalpindiz)

- Rawalpindiz won the toss and elected to field.
- Rawalpindiz recorded their first win in Pakistan Super League.

Match 36
24 April 2026
19:00 (N)
Scorecard

Hyderabad Kingsmen; 80 (15.5 overs)	v	Islamabad United; 83/2 (6.4 overs)
Usman Khan 25* (35); Richard Gleeson 3/9 (3 overs)		Mohsin Riaz 42 (18); Mohammad Ali 2/29 (3.4 overs)

Islamabad United won by 8 wickets
National Bank Stadium, Karachi
Umpires: Chris Gaffaney (NZ) and Rashid Riaz (Pak)
Player of the match: Richard Gleeson (Islamabad United)

- Islamabad United won the toss and elected to field.
- Islamabad United and Multan Sultan qualified for the play-offs as a result of this match.

Match 40
26 April 2026
19:00 (N)
Scorecard

Multan Sultans; 192/7 (20 overs)	v	Islamabad United; 193/6 (20 overs)
Shan Masood 44 (33); Faheem Ashraf 1/23 (3 overs)		Mark Chapman 69* (33); Faisal Akram 2/41 (4 overs)

Islamabad United won by 4 wickets
National Bank Stadium, Karachi
Umpires: Rashid Riaz (Pak) and Sharfuddoula (Ban)
Player of the match: Mark Chapman (Islamabad United)

- Islamabad United won the toss and elected to field.

== Playoffs ==
=== Bracket ===
Qualifier
28 April 2026
1	Peshawar Zalmi	221/7 (20 overs)
2	Islamabad United	151 (18.4 overs)
Eliminator 1
29 April 2026
3	Multan Sultans	159/9 (20 overs)
4	Hyderabad Kingsmen	162/2 (15.2 overs)

Eliminator 2
01 May 2026
QL	Islamabad United	184/7 (20 overs)
E1W	Hyderabad Kingsmen	186/5 (20 overs)

Final
03 May 2026
QW	Peshawar Zalmi	130/5 (15.2 overs)
E2W	Hyderabad Kingsmen	129 (18 overs)

=== Qualifier ===
Qualifier
28 April 2026
19:00 (N)
Scorecard

Peshawar Zalmi; 221/7 (20 overs)	v	Islamabad United; 151 (18.4 overs)
Babar Azam 103 (59); Shadab Khan 3/42 (4 overs)		Sameer Minhas 44 (23); Aaron Hardie 3/24 (4 overs)

Peshawar Zalmi won by 70 runs
National Bank Stadium, Karachi
Umpires: Alex Wharf (Eng) and Chris Gaffaney (NZ)
Player of the match: Babar Azam (Peshawar Zalmi)

- Islamabad United won the toss and elected to field.

=== Eliminator 2 ===
Eliminator 2
01 May 2026
19:00 (N)
Scorecard

Hyderabad Kingsmen; 186/5 (20 overs)	v	Islamabad United; 184/7 (20 overs)
Usman Khan 61* (30); Imad Wasim 2/16 (2 overs)		Mark Chapman 43 (26); Hunain Shah 2/37 (4 overs)

Hyderabad Kingsmen won by 2 runs
Gaddafi Stadium, Lahore
Umpires: Ahsan Raza (Pak) and Sharfuddoula (Ban)
Player of the match: Hunain Shah (Hyderabad Kingsmen)

- Islamabad United won the toss and elected to field.
