= 2026 Quetta Gladiators season =

2026 season Quetta Gladiators

Quetta Gladiators
2026 season
- Coach: Sarfraz Ahmed
- Captain: Saud Shakeel
- League stage: 7th place

Quetta Gladiators is a Pakistani professional Twenty20 franchise cricket team that will compete in 2026 Pakistan Super League. The team is based in the Quetta city of Pakistan. This will be the eleventh consecutive season of the Gladiators in the Pakistan Super League after renewing their franchise agreement for another decade in December 2025.

Quetta finished 2nd in the 2025 Pakistan Super League losing final to Lahore Qalandars. They are currently coached by Sarfraz Ahmed and captained by Saud Shakeel.

== Squad ==
Pakistan Super League introduced an auction model for the first time in the 2026 season, allowing teams to select players by bidding in Pakistani rupees. Teams were also allowed to directly sign one foreign player who was not part of previous season. Gladiators signed Spencer Johnson as their directly signed player. Teams were also allowed to retain up to 4 players who were part of their squads in previous seasons, while new teams were allowed to sign 4 players before the auction to match with other franchises. Quetta retained Abrar Ahmed, Usman Tariq, Hassan Nawaz and Shamyl Hussain from their squad.

Player auction for the PSL 11 was held on 11 February 2026. Following is the full squad of Quetta Gladiators after the player auction and retentions.

Key
- Players with international caps are listed in **bold**.
- * denotes a player who is fully unavailable
- * denotes a player who will be partially unavailable

| No. | Name | Nationality | Birth date | Salary | Batting style | Bowling style | Year signed | Notes |
Batsmen
| 07 | **Hassan Nawaz** | Pakistan | 21 August 2002 (age 24) | PKR 3.92 crore | Right-handed | Right-arm off break | 2025 | |
| 18 | Shamyl Hussain | Pakistan | 10 October 2004 (age 22) | PKR 84 lakh | Left-handed | — | 2026 | |
| 32 | **Rilee Rossouw** | South Africa | 9 October 1989 (age 37) | PKR 5.55 crore | Left-handed | Right-arm off break | 2026 | |
| 70 | **Bevon Jacobs** | New Zealand | 6 May 2002 (age 24) | PKR 60 lakh | Right-handed | Right-arm medium | 2026 | |
| 59 | **Saud Shakeel** | Pakistan | 5 September 1995 (age 31) | PKR 65 lakh | Left-handed | Slow left arm orthodox | 2026 | |
| 47 | **Ben McDermott** | Australia | 12 December 1994 (age 31) | PKR 1.10 crore | Right-handed | Right-arm medium | 2026 | |
Wicket-keepers
| 36 | **Khawaja Nafay** | Pakistan | 13 February 2002 (age 24) | PKR 6.50 crore | Right-handed | — | 2026 | |
| 44 | Bismillah Khan | Pakistan | 1 March 1990 (age 36) | PKR 60 lakh | Right-handed | — | 2026 | |
| 6 | Sam Harper | Australia | 10 December 1996 (age 29) | PKR 60 lakh | Right-handed | — | 2026 | |
All-rounders
| 23 | **Arafat Minhas** | Pakistan | 2 January 2005 (age 21) | PKR 1.10 crore | Left-handed | Slow left arm orthodox | 2026 | |
| 58 | **Jahandad Khan** | Pakistan | 16 June 2003 (age 23) | PKR 2.50 crore | Left-handed | Left-arm fast-medium | 2026 | |
| 30 | Brett Hampton | New Zealand | 30 April 1991 (age 35) | PKR 60 lakh | Right-handed | Right-arm medium | 2026 | |
| 59 | **Tom Curran** | England | 12 March 1995 (age 31) | PKR 4.20 crore | Right-handed | Right-arm medium | 2026 | |
Bowlers
| 7 | **Usman Tariq** | Pakistan | 7 June 1995 (age 31) | PKR 5.6 crore | Right-handed | Right-arm off break | 2024 | |
| 40 | **Abrar Ahmed** | Pakistan | 16 October 1998 (age 28) | PKR 7.0 crore | Right-handed | Right-arm leg break | 2024 | |
| 45 | **Spencer Johnson** | Australia | 16 December 1995 (age 30) | PKR 5.6 crore | Left-handed | Left-arm fast | 2026 | |
| 37 | **Faisal Akram** | Pakistan | 20 August 2003 (age 23) | PKR 1.25 crore | Left-handed | Left-arm wrist spin | 2026 | |
| 14 | Waseem Akram Jr | Pakistan | 1 June 2002 (age 24) | PKR 60 lakh | Right-handed | Right-arm fast-medium | 2026 | |
| 18 | Khan Zeb | Pakistan | N/A | PKR 60 lakh | Right-handed | Right-arm fast-medium | 2026 | |

- Source: Cricinfo

== Coaching and management staff ==
| Name | Position |
|---|---|
| Moin Khan | Director |
| Sarfaraz Ahmed | Head coach |
| Krishmar Santokie | Bowling coach |
| Viv Richards | Mentor |

== Season standings ==
| Pos | Team | Pld | W | L | NR | Pts | NRR | Qualification |
|---|---|---|---|---|---|---|---|---|
| 1 | Peshawar Zalmi (C) | 10 | 8 | 1 | 1 | 17 | 2.324 | Advanced to the Qualifier |
| 2 | Islamabad United (3rd) | 10 | 6 | 3 | 1 | 13 | 1.667 | Advanced to the Qualifier |
| 3 | Multan Sultans (4th) | 10 | 6 | 4 | 0 | 12 | 0.326 | Advanced to the Eliminator 1 |
| 4 | Hyderabad Kingsmen (R) | 10 | 5 | 5 | 0 | 10 | −0.361 | Advanced to the Eliminator 1 |
| 5 | Lahore Qalandars | 10 | 5 | 5 | 0 | 10 | −0.482 | Eliminated |
| 6 | Karachi Kings | 10 | 5 | 5 | 0 | 10 | −0.869 | Eliminated |
| 7 | Quetta Gladiators | 10 | 3 | 7 | 0 | 6 | −0.410 | Eliminated |
| 8 | Rawalpindiz | 10 | 1 | 9 | 0 | 2 | −1.760 | Eliminated |

Source: ESPNcricinfo

Notes

- C = Champions;
- R = Runners-up;
- (x) = Position at the end of the tournament;

== Fixtures ==
Match 2
27 March 2026
19:00 (N)
Scorecard

| Karachi Kings; 181/7 (20 overs) | v | Quetta Gladiators; 167/7 (20 overs) |
| Moeen Ali 48* (29); Ahmed Daniyal 3/36 (4 overs) | | Shamyl Hussain 52 (24); Hassan Ali 4/27 (4 overs) |

Karachi Kings won by 14 runs.
Gaddafi Stadium, Lahore
Umpires: Sharfuddoula (Ban) and Tariq Rasheed (Pak)
Player of the match: Moeen Ali (Karachi Kings)

- Quetta Gladiators won the toss and elected to field.

Match 5
29 March 2026
14:30
Scorecard

| Quetta Gladiators; 174/8 (20 overs) | v | Hyderabad Kingsmen; 134/8 (20 overs) |
| Shamyl Hussain 54 (41); Riley Meredith 3/38 (4 overs) | | Irfan Khan Niazi 33 (25); Abrar Ahmed 3/23 (4 overs) |

Quetta Gladiators won by 40 runs.
Gaddafi Stadium, Lahore
Umpires: Ahsan Raza (Pak) and Alex Wharf (Eng)
Player of the match: Shamyl Hussain (Quetta Gladiators)

- Quetta Gladiators won the toss and elected to bat.

Match 9
2 April 2026
14:30
Scorecard

| Quetta Gladiators; 183/5 (20 overs) | v | Islamabad United; 189/2 (18.2 overs) |
| Hasan Nawaz 66 (36); Shadab Khan 3/23 (4 overs) | | Sameer Minhas 82* (48); Abrar Ahmed 2/29 (4 overs) |

Islamabad United won by 8 wickets
Gaddafi Stadium, Lahore
Umpires: Alex Wharf (Eng) and Rashid Riaz (Pak)
Player of the match: Shadab Khan (Islamabad United)

- Quetta Gladiators won the toss and elected to bat.

Match 13
5 April 2026
19:00 (N)
Scorecard

| Quetta Gladiators; 166/7 (20 overs) | v | Multan Sultans; 167/4 (17.3 overs) |
| Saud Shakeel 56 (41); Mohammad Nawaz 3/30 (4 overs) | | Steve Smith 53 (35); Hassan Nawaz 2/17 (2 overs) |

Multan Sultans won by 6 wickets
Gaddafi Stadium, Lahore
Umpires: Chris Gaffaney (NZ) and Faisal Afridi (Pak)
Player of the match: Mohammad Nawaz (Multan Sultans)

- Multan Sultans won the toss and elected to field.

Match 18
10 April 2026
19:00 (N)
Scorecard

| Quetta Gladiators; 182/6 (20 overs) | v | Rawalpindiz; 121 (17.3 overs) |
| Rilee Rossouw 53 (42); Ben Sears 3/41 (4 overs) | | Saad Masood 31 (19); Saud Shakeel 2/4 (1 over) |

Quetta Gladiators won by 61 runs
National Bank Stadium, Karachi
Umpires: Imran Javed (Pak) and Sharfuddoula (Ban)
Player of the match: Rilee Rossouw (Quetta Gladiators)

- Rawalpindiz won the toss and elected to field.

Match 23
15 April 2026
19:00 (N)
Scorecard

| Quetta Gladiators; 154 (20 overs) | v | Peshawar Zalmi; 156/2 (18.3 overs) |
| Hasan Nawaz 37 (35); Sufiyan Muqeem 3/25 (4 overs) | | Babar Azam 71* (51); Saud Shakeel 1/23 (3 overs) |

Peshawar Zalmi won by 8 wickets
National Bank Stadium, Karachi
Umpires: Chris Brown (NZ) and Rashid Riaz (Pak)
Player of the match: Sufiyan Muqeem (Peshawar Zalmi)

- Peshawar Zalmi won the toss and elected to field.
- Mohammad Basit (Peshawar Zalmi) made his debut in PSL.
- Rilee Rossouw (Quetta Gladiators) became the first overseas player to play 100 matches in the PSL.
- Babar Azam (Peshawar Zalmi) scored his 100th half-century in T20s.

Match 26
17 April 2026
19:00 (N)
Scorecard

| Lahore Qalandars; 134 (19.5 overs) | v | Quetta Gladiators; 138/4 (16.2 overs) |
| Haseebullah Khan 33 (37); Usman Tariq 3/18 (4 overs) | | Rilee Rossouw 60* (49); Sikandar Raza 1/17 (2 overs) |

Quetta Gladiators won by 6 wickets
National Bank Stadium, Karachi
Umpires: Allahudien Paleker (SA) and Chris Brown (NZ)
Player of the match: Usman Tariq (Quetta Gladiators)

- Lahore Qalandars won the toss and elected to bat.
- Charith Asalanka (Lahore Qalandars) made his debut in PSL.
- Peshawar Zalmi qualified for the play-offs as a result of this match.

Match 29
19 April 2026
19:00 (N)
Scorecard

| Peshawar Zalmi; 255/3 (20 overs) | v | Quetta Gladiators; 137 (18.1 overs) |
| Babar Azam 100* (52); Abrar Ahmed 1/44 (4 overs) | | Bevon Jacobs 34 (27); Ali Raza 3/9 (3.1 overs) |

Peshawar Zalmi won by 118 runs
National Bank Stadium, Karachi
Umpires: Chris Brown (NZ) and Faisal Afridi (Pak)
Player of the match: Babar Azam (Peshawar Zalmi)

- Quetta Gladiators won the toss and elected to field.
- Peshawar Zalmi scored their highest total in Pakistan Super League, surpassing 246/3 which scored earlier in this season.

Match 30
21 April 2026
14:30
Scorecard

| Lahore Qalandars; 197/6 (20 overs) | v | Quetta Gladiators; 188/7 (20 overs) |
| Fakhar Zaman 103 (51); Khalil Ahmed 2/38 (4 overs) | | Rilee Rossouw 62 (29); Haris Rauf 2/28 (4 overs) |

Lahore Qalandars won by 9 runs
Gaddafi Stadium, Lahore
Umpires: Ahsan Raza (Pak) and Allahudien Paleker (SA)
Player of the match: Fakhar Zaman (Lahore Qalandars)

- Lahore Qalandars won the toss and elected to bat.

Match 37
25 April 2026
14:30
Scorecard

| Quetta Gladiators; 195/6 (20 overs) | v | Karachi Kings; 199/1 (18.3 overs) |
| Rilee Rossouw 90 (54); Abbas Afridi 2/22 (2.2 overs) | | David Warner 89* (48); Jahandad Khan 1/38 (3.3 overs) |

Karachi Kings won by 9 wickets
Gaddafi Stadium, Lahore
Umpires: Chris Brown (NZ) and Nasir Hussain (Pak)
Player of the match: David Warner (Karachi Kings)

- Karachi Kings won the toss and elected to field.
- Quetta Gladiators were eliminated as a result of this match.
