= 2026 Karachi Kings season =

Overview of Karachi Kings in 2026

Karachi Kings
2026 season
- Coach: Ravi Bopara
- Captain: David Warner
- Ground(s): National Bank Cricket Arena
- League stage: 6th place

Karachi Kings is a Pakistani professional Twenty20 franchise cricket team that will compete in 2026 Pakistan Super League. The team is based in the Karachi city of Pakistan. This will be the eleventh consecutive season of the Kings in the Pakistan Super League after renewing their franchise agreement for another decade in December 2025.

Karachi finished fourth in the 2025 Pakistan Super League. They are currently coached by Ravi Bopara and captained by David Warner.

== Squad ==
Pakistan Super League introduced an auction model for the first time in the 2026 season, allowing teams to select players by bidding in Pakistani rupees. Teams were also allowed to directly sign one foreign player who was not part of previous season. Kings signed Moeen Ali as their directly signed player.. Teams were also allowed to retain up to 4 players who were part of their squads in previous seasons, while new teams were allowed to sign 4 players before the auction to match with other franchises. Karachi retained Khushdil Shah, Saad Baig, Abbas Afridi and Hasan Ali from their squad.

Player auction for the PSL 11 was held on 11 February 2026. Following is the full squad of Karachi Kings after the player auction and retentions.

Key
- Players with international caps are listed in **bold**.
- * denotes a player who is fully unavailable
- * denotes a player who will be partially unavailable

No.	Name	Nationality	Birth date	Salary	Batting style	Bowling style	Year signed	Notes
Batters
31	**David Warner**	Australia	27 October 1986 (age 40)	PKR 7.90 crore	Left-handed	Right-arm leg break	2025	
47	**Aqib Ilyas**	Pakistan	5 September 1992 (age 34)	PKR 60 lakh	Right-handed	Right-arm off spin	2026	
10	**Muhammad Waseem**	United Arab Emirates	12 February 1996 (age 30)	PKR 1.10 crore	Right-handed	Right-arm medium	2026	
Wicket-keepers
13	Saad Baig	Pakistan	1 November 2006 (age 20)	PKR 60 lakh	Left-handed	—	2025	
77	**Azam Khan**	Pakistan	10 August 1998 (age 28)	PKR 3.25 crore	Right-handed	—	2026	
25	**Johnson Charles**	West Indies	14 January 1989 (age 37)	PKR 2.00 crore	Right-handed	—	2026	
All-rounders
18	**Moeen Ali**	England	18 June 1987 (age 39)	PKR 6.44 crore	Left-handed	Right-arm off break	2026	
72	**Khushdil Shah**	Pakistan	7 February 1995 (age 31)	PKR 3.36 crore	Left-handed	Slow left-arm orthodox	2025	
67	**Salman Ali Agha**	Pakistan	23 October 1993 (age 33)	PKR 5.85 crore	Right-handed	Right-arm Off spin	2026	
24	Shahid Aziz	Pakistan	23 March 2003 (age 23)	PKR 92.5 lakh	Right-handed	Right-arm fast-medium	2026	
Bowlers
32	**Hasan Ali**	Pakistan	7 February 1994 (age 32)	PKR 4.76 crore	Right-handed	Right-arm fast-medium	2025	
55	**Abbas Afridi**	Pakistan	5 April 2001 (age 25)	PKR 3.08 crore	Right-handed	Right-arm fast-medium	2025	
39	**Mir Hamza**	Pakistan	10 September 1992 (age 34)	PKR 2.40 crore	Left-handed	Left-arm medium	2026	
88	**Adam Zampa**	Australia	31 March 1992 (age 34)	PKR 4.50 crore	Right-handed	Right-arm leg break	2026	
—	Mohammad Hamza Sohail	Pakistan	30 October 2000 (age 26)	PKR 60 lakh	Right-handed	Right-arm fast-medium	2026	
19	Khuzaima bin Tanveer	United Arab Emirates	20 December 1999 (age 26)	PKR 60 lakh	Right-handed	Right-arm fast	2026	
52	**Ihsanullah**	Pakistan	11 October 2002 (age 24)	PKR 1.05 crore	Right-handed	Right-arm fast	2026	
—	Rizwanullah	Pakistan	N/A	PKR 60 lakh	Right-handed	Right-arm fast-medium	2026	

- Source: ESPNcricinfo

== Coaching and management staff ==
- Head Coach: Ravi Bopara
- Assistant Coach: Muhammad Masroor

== Season standings ==
Pos	Team	Pld	W	L	NR	Pts	NRR	Qualification
1	Peshawar Zalmi (C)	10	8	1	1	17	2.324	Advanced to the Qualifier
2	Islamabad United (3rd)	10	6	3	1	13	1.667	Advanced to the Qualifier
3	Multan Sultans (4th)	10	6	4	0	12	0.326	Advanced to the Eliminator 1
4	Hyderabad Kingsmen (R)	10	5	5	0	10	−0.361	Advanced to the Eliminator 1
5	Lahore Qalandars	10	5	5	0	10	−0.482	Eliminated
6	Karachi Kings	10	5	5	0	10	−0.869	Eliminated
7	Quetta Gladiators	10	3	7	0	6	−0.410	Eliminated
8	Rawalpindiz	10	1	9	0	2	−1.760	Eliminated

Source: ESPNcricinfo

Notes

- C = Champions;
- R = Runners-up;
- (x) = Position at the end of the tournament;

== Fixtures ==
Match 2
27 March 2026
19:00 (N)
Scorecard

Karachi Kings; 181/7 (20 overs)	v	Quetta Gladiators; 167/7 (20 overs)
Moeen Ali 48* (29); Ahmed Daniyal 3/36 (4 overs)		Shamyl Hussain 52 (24); Hassan Ali 4/27 (4 overs)

Karachi Kings won by 14 runs.
Gaddafi Stadium, Lahore
Umpires: Sharfuddoula (Ban) and Tariq Rasheed (Pak)
Player of the match: Moeen Ali (Karachi Kings)

- Quetta Gladiators won the toss and elected to field.

Match 6
29 March 2026
19:00 (N)
Scorecard

Lahore Qalandars; 128/9 (20 overs)	v	Karachi Kings; 131/6 (19.3 overs)
Abdullah Shafique 33 (24); Adam Zampa 2/11 (4 overs)		Muhammad Waseem 38 (37); Shaheen Afridi 4/18 (4 overs)

Karachi Kings won by 4 wickets.
Gaddafi Stadium, Lahore
Umpires: Faisal Afridi (Pak) and Sharfuddoula (Ban)
Player of the match: Adam Zampa (Karachi Kings)

- Lahore Qalandars won the toss and elected to bat.
- Karachi Kings were awarded 5 penalty runs for Lahore Qalandars' ball tampering.

Match 10
2 April 2026
19:00 (N)
Scorecard

Rawalpindiz; 197/6 (20 overs)	v	Karachi Kings; 199/5 (19.2 overs)
Daryl Mitchell 65 (41); Hasan Ali 3/24 (4 overs)		Azam Khan 74 (34); Daryl Mitchell 3/32 (3.2 overs)

Karachi Kings won by 5 wickets
Gaddafi Stadium, Lahore
Umpires: Ahsan Raza (Pak) and Asif Yaqoob (Pak)
Player of the match: Azam Khan (Karachi Kings)

- Karachi Kings won the toss and elected to field.

Match 17
9 April 2026
19:00 (N)
Scorecard

Peshawar Zalmi; 246/3 (20 overs)	v	Karachi Kings; 87 (16.1 overs)
Kusal Mendis 109 (52); Abbas Afridi 2/55 (4 overs)		Azam Khan 25 (27); Nahid Rana 3/7 (4 overs)

Peshawar Zalmi won by 159 runs
National Bank Stadium, Karachi
Umpires: Chris Gaffaney (NZ) and Rashid Riaz (Pak)
Player of the match: Kusal Mendis (Peshawar Zalmi)

- Karachi Kings won the toss and elected to field.
- Babar Azam (Peshawar Zalmi) became the fastest batter to score 12,000 runs in T20s.
- Kusal Mendis (Peshawar Zalmi) scored his maiden century in Pakistan Super League and became the first player from Sri Lanka to score a century in Pakistan Super League.
- The 191-run partnership between Kusal Mendis and Babar Azam (Peshawar Zalmi) became the highest partnership for any wicket in the Pakistan Super League.
- Peshawar Zalmi scored their highest total in Pakistan Super League.
- Karachi Kings scored their lowest total in Pakistan Super League.
- Peshawar Zalmi recorded the largest win by runs in Pakistan Super League.

Match 20
11 April 2026
19:00 (N)
Scorecard

Karachi Kings; 188/8 (20 overs)	v	Hyderabad Kingsmen; 189/6 (19.1 overs)
Saad Baig 53 (37); Hunain Shah 3/19 (4 overs)		Maaz Sadaqat 37 (29); Abbas Afridi 2/30 (4 overs)

Hyderabad Kingsmen won by 4 wickets
National Bank Stadium, Karachi
Umpires: Sharfuddoula (Ban) and Zulfiqar Jan (Pak)
Player of the match: Hassan Khan (Hyderabad Kingsmen)

- Hyderabad Kingsmen won the toss and elected to field.
- Hyderabad Kingsmen recorded their first win in Pakistan Super League.

Match 25
16 April 2026
19:00 (N)
Scorecard

Karachi Kings; 150/6 (20 overs)	v	Islamabad United; 123/5 (16.3 overs)
Reeza Hendricks 51* (44); Richard Gleeson 2/22 (4 overs)		Sameer Minhas 58 (36); Moeen Ali 1/14 (2 overs)

Islamabad United won by 8 wickets
National Bank Stadium, Karachi
Umpires: Asif Yaqoob (Pak) and Chris Gaffaney (NZ)
Player of the match: Sameer Minhas (Islamabad United)

- Islamabad United won the toss and elected to field.
- Dipendra Singh Airee (Islamabad United) made his debut in PSL as a substitute player.

Match 28
19 April 2026
14:30
Scorecard

Karachi Kings; 207/7 (20 overs)	v	Multan Sultans; 196 (19.4 overs)
Shan Masood 46 (25); Khushdil Shah 3/35 (4 overs)		Reeza Hendricks 49 (32); Arafat Minhas 3/32 (3 overs)

Multan Sultans won by 11 runs
National Bank Stadium, Karachi
Umpires: Asif Yaqoob (Pak) and Chris Gaffaney (NZ)
Player of the match: Arafat Minhas (Multan Sultans)

- Karachi Kings won the toss and elected to field.

Match 32
22 April 2026
14:30
Scorecard

Karachi Kings; 182/9 (20 overs)	v	Peshawar Zalmi; 186/3 (18.5 overs)
Jason Roy 85 (51); Ali Raza 4/41 (4 overs)		Kusal Mendis 80* (43); Khushdil Shah 1/40 (4 overs)

Peshawar Zalmi won by 7 wickets
Gaddafi Stadium, Lahore
Umpires: Ahsan Raza (Pak) and Allahudien Paleker (SA)
Player of the match: Kusal Mendis (Peshawar Zalmi)

- Karachi Kings won the toss and elected to bat.
- Kusal Mendis (Peshawar Zalmi) scored his 6,000th run in T20s.
- Kusal Mendis (Peshawar Zalmi) surpassed Rilee Rossouw for the record of most runs by an overseas batsman in a single PSL edition, reaching a total of 493 runs.

Match 35
23 April 2026
19:00 (N)
Scorecard

Lahore Qalandars; 199/6 (20 overs)	v	Karachi Kings; 203/5 (18.4 overs)
Abdullah Shafique 63 (36); Moeen Ali 2/26 (4 overs)		David Warner 63* (44); Ubaid Shah 3/41 (4 overs)

Karachi Kings won by 5 wickets
Gaddafi Stadium, Lahore
Umpires: Allahudien Paleker (SA) and Nasir Hussain (Pak)
Player of the match: Khushdil Shah (Karachi Kings)

- Karachi Kings won the toss and elected to field.

Match 37
25 April 2026
14:30
Scorecard

Quetta Gladiators; 195/6 (20 overs)	v	Karachi Kings; 199/1 (18.3 overs)
Rilee Rossouw 90 (54); Abbas Afridi 2/22 (2.2 overs)		David Warner 89* (48); Jahandad Khan 1/38 (3.3 overs)

Karachi Kings won by 9 wickets
Gaddafi Stadium, Lahore
Umpires: Chris Brown (NZ) and Nasir Hussain (Pak)
Player of the match: David Warner (Karachi Kings)

- Karachi Kings won the toss and elected to field.
- Quetta Gladiators were eliminated as a result of this match.
