= 2026 Rawalpindiz season =

Inaugural season of Pindiz

Pindiz
2026 season
- Coach: TBD
- Captain: Mohammad Rizwan
- Ground(s): Rawalpindi Cricket Stadium
- League stage: 8th place

The 2026 season is the inaugural season for the Rawalpindiz franchise in the Pakistan Super League (PSL), following its relocation and rebranding from the Multan Sultans. The franchise is owned by Walee Technologies, which acquired the rights in February 2026 for a record-breaking PKR 2.45 billion.

== Background ==
Following the expiration of the previous ownership agreement for the Multan Sultans, the Pakistan Cricket Board (PCB) conducted a fresh auction on 9 February 2026. Walee Technologies, a Pakistani AdTech firm, secured the franchise with a bid of PKR 245 Crore, making it the most expensive team in the league's history. Immediately after the sale, CEO Ahsan Tahir announced the team would move to Rawalpindi.

The 2026 season also marks the expansion of the PSL from six to eight teams, with the addition of franchises from Sialkot and Hyderabad.

== Personnel ==
=== Coaching and management staff ===
Position	Name
President Cricket Affairs	(Pakistan) Inzamam-ul-Haq
**Head coach**	—
**Assistant coach**	—
**Batting coach**	—
**Bowling coach**	(Pakistan) Sohail Tanvir
**General Manager**	(Pakistan) Harris Jalil Mir
**Director Player Pathway & Game Development**	(Pakistan) Rashid Latif
**Owner**	Walee Technologies

=== Squad ===
Key
- Players with international caps are listed in **bold**.
- * denotes a player who is fully unavailable
- * denotes a player who will be partially unavailable

No.	Name	Nationality	Birth date	Salary	Batting style	Bowling style	Year signed	Notes
Batsmen
88	Yasir Khan	Pakistan	3 March 1998 (age 28)	PKR 60 lakh	Right-handed	Right-arm medium	2026	
	Abdullah Fazal	Pakistan	16 January 2003 (age 23)	PKR 67.50 lakh	Left-handed	—	2026	
23	**Jake Fraser-McGurk**	Australia	11 April 2002 (age 24)	PKR	Right-handed		2026	
Wicket-Keepers
16	**Mohammad Rizwan**	Pakistan	1 June 1992 (age 34)	PKR 5.60 crore	Right-handed	—	2026	Captain
77	**Sam Billings**	England	15 June 1991 (age 35)	PKR 3.08 crore	Right-handed	—	2026	
All-rounders
75	**Daryl Mitchell**	New Zealand	20 May 1991 (age 35)	PKR 8.05 crore	Right-handed	Right-arm fast-medium	2026	
32	Laurie Evans	England	12 October 1987 (age 39)	PKR 1.1 crore	Right-handed	Right-arm medium	2026	
33	**Asif Afridi**	Pakistan	25 December 1986 (age 39)	PKR 2.4 crore	Left-handed	Slow left-arm orthodox	2026	
37	Amad Butt	Pakistan	10 May 1995 (age 31)	PKR 80 lakh	Right-handed	Right arm fast-medium	2026	
82	**Kamran Ghulam**	Pakistan	10 October 1995 (age 31)	PKR 65 lakh	Right-handed	Slow left-arm orthodox	2026	
	Dian Forrester	South Africa	10 October 1995 (age 31)	PKR 65 lakh	Left-handed	Right-handed fasr	2026	
Bowlers
71	**Naseem Shah**	Pakistan	15 February 2003 (age 23)	PKR 8.65 crore	Right-handed	Right-arm fast	2026	
5	**Mohammad Amir**	Pakistan	13 April 1992 (age 34)	PKR 5.40 crore	Left-handed	Left-arm fast	2026	
22	**Rishad Hossain**	Bangladesh	15 July 2002 (age 24)	PKR 3.0 crore	Right-handed	Right-arm leg break	2026	
27	**Zaman Khan**	Pakistan	10 September 2001 (age 25)	PKR 1.12 crore	Right-handed	Right-arm fast-medium	2026	
	Fawad Ali	Pakistan	6 June 2004 (age 22)	PKR 60 lakh	Right-handed	Right-arm fast-medium	2026	
	Mohammad Amir Khan	Pakistan	9 September 2001 (age 25)	PKR 60 lakh	Right-handed	Right-arm medium-fast	2026	
	Shahzaib Khan	Pakistan	28 February 1995 (age 31)	PKR 60 lakh	Right-handed	Right-arm off break	2026	

== Season standings ==
Pos	Team	Pld	W	L	NR	Pts	NRR	Qualification
1	Peshawar Zalmi (C)	10	8	1	1	17	2.324	Advanced to the Qualifier
2	Islamabad United (3rd)	10	6	3	1	13	1.667	Advanced to the Qualifier
3	Multan Sultans (4th)	10	6	4	0	12	0.326	Advanced to the Eliminator 1
4	Hyderabad Kingsmen (R)	10	5	5	0	10	−0.361	Advanced to the Eliminator 1
5	Lahore Qalandars	10	5	5	0	10	−0.482	Eliminated
6	Karachi Kings	10	5	5	0	10	−0.869	Eliminated
7	Quetta Gladiators	10	3	7	0	6	−0.410	Eliminated
8	Rawalpindiz	10	1	9	0	2	−1.760	Eliminated

Source: ESPNcricinfo

Notes

- C = Champions;
- R = Runners-up;
- (x) = Position at the end of the tournament;

== Fixtures ==
Match 3
28 March 2026
14:30
Scorecard

Rawalpindiz; 214/4 (20 overs)	v	Peshawar Zalmi; 218/5 (19.1 overs)
Yasir Khan 83 (46); Ali Raza 2/42 (3 overs)		Mohammad Haris 47 (28); Amad Butt 2/45 (4 overs)

Peshawar Zalmi won by 5 wickets.
Gaddafi Stadium, Lahore
Umpires: Alex Wharf (Eng) and Faisal Afridi (Pak)
Player of the match: Michael Bracewell (Peshawar Zalmi)

- Rawalpindiz won the toss and elected to bat.

Match 10
2 April 2026
19:00 (N)
Scorecard

Rawalpindiz; 197/6 (20 overs)	v	Karachi Kings; 199/5 (19.2 overs)
Daryl Mitchell 65 (41); Hasan Ali 3/24 (4 overs)		Azam Khan 74 (34); Daryl Mitchell 3/32 (3.2 overs)

Karachi Kings won by 5 wickets
Gaddafi Stadium, Lahore
Umpires: Ahsan Raza (Pak) and Asif Yaqoob (Pak)
Player of the match: Azam Khan (Karachi Kings)

- Karachi Kings won the toss and elected to field.

Match 12
4 April 2026
19:00 (N)
Scorecard

Rawalpindiz; 156/7 (20 overs)	v	Islamabad United; 157/3 (14.2 overs)
Kamran Ghulam 50 (39); Richard Gleeson 2/21 (4 overs)		Sameer Minhas 70 (36); Mohammad Amir 1/18 (3 overs)

Islamabad United won by 7 wickets
Gaddafi Stadium, Lahore
Umpires: Abdul Muqeet (Pak) and Alex Wharf (Eng)
Player of the match: Sameer Minhas (Islamabad United)

- Islamabad United won the toss and elected to field.
- Mohammad Faiq (Islamabad United) made his debut in PSL.

Match 14
6 April 2026
19:00 (N)
Scorecard

Rawalpindiz; 182/8 (20 overs)	v	Multan Sultans; 186/3 (16.2 overs)
Sam Billings 56* (41); Faisal Akram 4/31 (4 overs)		Sahibzada Farhan 68 (38); Mohammad Amir 2/32 (3 overs)

Multan Sultans won by 7 wickets
Gaddafi Stadium, Lahore
Umpires: Abdul Muqeet (Pak) and Sharfuddoula (Ban)
Player of the match: Faisal Akram (Multan Sultans)

- Multan Sultans won the toss and elected to field.

Match 18
10 April 2026
19:00 (N)
Scorecard

Quetta Gladiators; 182/6 (20 overs)	v	Rawalpindiz; 121 (17.3 overs)
Rilee Rossouw 53 (42); Ben Sears 3/41 (4 overs)		Saad Masood 31 (19); Saud Shakeel 2/4 (1 over)

Quetta Gladiators won by 61 runs
National Bank Stadium, Karachi
Umpires: Imran Javed (Pak) and Sharfuddoula (Ban)
Player of the match: Rilee Rossouw (Quetta Gladiators)

- Rawalpindiz won the toss and elected to field.

Match 24
16 April 2026
14:30
Scorecard

Rawalpindiz; 121/9 (20 overs)	v	Hyderabad Kingsmen; 123/5 (16.3 overs)
Sam Billings 26 (22); Hunain Shah 3/18 (4 overs)		Irfan Khan Niazi 34* (29); Asif Afridi 2/20 (4 overs)

Hyderabad Kingsmen won by 5 wickets
National Bank Stadium, Karachi
Umpires: Chris Brown (NZ) and Tariq Rasheed (Pak)
Player of the match: Hunain Shah (Hyderabad Kingsmen)

- Hyderabad Kingsmen won the toss and elected to field.
- Glenn Maxwell (Hyderabad Kingsmen) took his 200th wicket in T20s.

Match 27
18 April 2026
19:00 (N)
Scorecard

Lahore Qalandars; 210/4 (20 overs)	v	Rawalpindiz; 178/9 (20 overs)
Fakhar Zaman 84 (54); Mohammad Amir 2/25 (4 overs)		Yasir Khan 58 (29); Haris Rauf 3/43 (4 overs)

Lahore Qalandars won by 32 runs
National Bank Stadium, Karachi
Umpires: Allahudien Paleker (SA) and Nasir Hussain (Pak)
Player of the match: Fakhar Zaman (Lahore Qalandars)

- Lahore Qalandars won the toss and elected to bat.
- Rawalpindiz eliminated as a result of this match.

Match 31
21 April 2026
19:00 (N)
Scorecard

Rawalpindiz; 166/4 (20 overs)	v	Multan Sultans; 167/4 (18.4 overs)
Daryl Mitchell 58 (46); Mohammad Imran 1/9 (3 overs)		Steve Smith 56 (31); Asif Afridi 2/28 (4 overs)

Multan Sultans won by 6 wickets
National Bank Stadium, Karachi
Umpires: Rashid Riaz (Pak) and Sharfuddoula (Ban)
Player of the match: Steve Smith (Multan Sultans)

- Rawalpindiz won the toss and elected to bat.

Match 34
23 April 2026
14:30
Scorecard

Islamabad United; 137 (20 overs)	v	Rawalpindiz; 140/4 (18.1 overs)
Devon Conway 40 (33); Dian Forrester 2/9 (1 over)		Mohammad Rizwan 45 (38); Shadab Khan 1/18 (4 overs)

Rawalpindiz won by 6 wickets
National Bank Stadium, Karachi
Umpires: Alex Wharf (Eng) and Faisal Afridi (Pak)
Player of the match: Mohammad Rizwan (Rawalpindiz)

- Rawalpindiz won the toss and elected to field.
- Rawalpindiz recorded their first win in Pakistan Super League.

Match 39
26 April 2026
14:30
Scorecard

Hyderabad Kingsmen; 244/5 (20 overs)	v	Rawalpindiz; 136 (17.1 overs)
Glenn Maxwell 70 (37); Saad Masood 2/34 (4 overs)		Usman Khawaja 66* (43); Hunain Shah 4/22 (3.1 overs)

Hyderabad Kingsmen won by 108 runs
National Bank Stadium, Karachi
Umpires: Alex Wharf (Eng) and Zulfiqar Jan (Pak)
Player of the match: Glenn Maxwell (Hyderabad Kingsmen)

- Rawalpindiz won the toss and elected to field.
- Hyderabad Kingsmen qualified for the play-offs while Lahore Qalandars were eliminated as a result of this match.
