= 2026 Lahore Qalandars season =

Overview of Lahore Qalandars in 2026

Lahore Qalandars
2026 season
- Coach: Russell Domingo
- Captain: Shaheen Afridi
- Ground(s): Gaddafi Stadium Lahore
- League stage: 5th place
- Most runs: Fakhar Zaman (401)
- Most wickets: Shaheen Afridi (16)

Lahore Qalandars is a Pakistani professional Twenty20 franchise cricket team. Qalandars were one of the eight teams that competed in the 2026 Pakistan Super League. The team is based in the Lahore city of Pakistan. This was the eleventh consecutive season of the Qalandars in the Pakistan Super League after renewing their franchise agreement for another decade in December 2025.

Lahore entered the tournament as defending champions, having won the 2025 Pakistan Super League as their third title. They were coached by Russell Domingo and captained by Shaheen Shah Afridi during their 2026 season. Qalandars won 5 out of their 10 league matches and ended the tournament at 5th place on the points table.

== Squad ==
Pakistan Super League introduced auction model for the first time in 2026 season, allowing teams to select players by bidding in Pakistani rupees. Teams were also allowed to directly sign one foreign player who was not part of previous season. Qalandars signed Mustafizur Rahman as their directly signed player. Teams were also allowed to retain upto 4 players who were part of their squads in previous seasons, while new teams were allowed to sign 4 players before the auction to match with other franchises. Lahore retained their captain Shaheen Shah Afridi, Abdullah Shafique, Sikandar Raza and Mohammad Naeem from their squad.

Player auction for the PSL 11 was held on 11 February 2026. Following is the full squad of Lahore Qalandars after player auction and Retentions.

Key
- Players with international caps are listed in **bold**.
- * denotes a player who is fully unavailable.
- * denotes a player who will be partially unavailable.

No.	Name	Nationality	Birth date	Salary (PKR)	Batting style	Bowling style	Year signed	Notes
Batsmen
57	**Abdullah Shafique**	Pakistan	20 November 1999 (age 26)	2.2 crore	Right-handed	Right-arm offbreak	2022	
20	Muhammad Naeem	Pakistan	10 April 1999 (age 27)	70 Lakh	Right-handed	Right-arm offbreak	2025	
39	**Fakhar Zaman**	Pakistan	10 April 1990 (age 36)	PKR 7.95 crore	Left-handed	Slow left-arm orthodox	2026	
45	**Asif Ali**	Pakistan	1 October 1991 (age 35)	PKR 60 lakh	Right-handed	Right-arm medium	2026	
66	**Tayyab Tahir**	Pakistan	26 July 1993 (age 33)	PKR 60 lakh	Right-handed	Right-arm off break	2026	
12	**Parvez Hossain Emon**	Bangladesh	12 June 2002 (age 24)	PKR 60 lakh	Left-handed	—	2026	
—	Mohammad Farooq	Pakistan	4 March 2004 (age 22)	PKR 60 lakh	Right-handed	—	2026	
Wicket-Keepers
53	**Haseebullah Khan**	Pakistan	20 March 2003 (age 23)	PKR 1.1 crore	Left-handed	—	2026	
83	**Rubin Hermann**	South Africa	26 January 1997 (age 29)	PKR	Left-handed	—	2026	
All-rounders
24	**Sikandar Raza**	Zimbabwe	24 April 1986 (age 40)	2.8 crore	Right-handed	Right-arm offbreak	2023	
7	**Dasun Shanaka**	Sri Lanka	9 September 1991 (age 35)	PKR 75 lakh	Right-handed	Right-arm medium	2026	
20	**Hussain Talat**	Pakistan	12 February 1996 (age 30)	PKR 77.5 lakh	Left-handed	Right-arm medium-fast	2026	
64	**Gudakesh Motie**	West Indies	29 March 1995 (age 31)	PKR 1.1 crore	Left-handed	Slow left arm orthodox	2026	
Bowlers
10	**Shaheen Afridi**	Pakistan	6 April 2000 (age 26)	7.0 crore	Left-handed	Left-arm fast	2018	Captain
90	**Mustafizur Rahman**	Bangladesh	6 September 1995 (age 31)	6.44 crore	Left-handed	Left-arm fast-medium	2026	
97	**Haris Rauf**	Pakistan	7 November 1993 (age 33)	PKR 7.60 crore	Right-handed	Right-arm fast	2026	
24	**Usama Mir**	Pakistan	23 December 1995 (age 30)	PKR 3.5 crore	Right-handed	Right-arm leg break	2026	
12	Ubaid Shah	Pakistan	4 February 2006 (age 20)	PKR 2.70 crore	Right-handed	Right-arm fast	2026	

- Source: ESPNcricinfo

=== Coaching and management staff ===
- Head Coach:Russell Domingo

== Season standings ==
=== Points table ===
Pos	Team	Pld	W	L	NR	Pts	NRR	Qualification
1	Peshawar Zalmi (C)	10	8	1	1	17	2.324	Advanced to the Qualifier
2	Islamabad United (3rd)	10	6	3	1	13	1.667	Advanced to the Qualifier
3	Multan Sultans (4th)	10	6	4	0	12	0.326	Advanced to the Eliminator 1
4	Hyderabad Kingsmen (R)	10	5	5	0	10	−0.361	Advanced to the Eliminator 1
5	Lahore Qalandars	10	5	5	0	10	−0.482	Eliminated
6	Karachi Kings	10	5	5	0	10	−0.869	Eliminated
7	Quetta Gladiators	10	3	7	0	6	−0.410	Eliminated
8	Rawalpindiz	10	1	9	0	2	−1.760	Eliminated

Source: ESPNcricinfo

Notes

- C = Champions;
- R = Runners-up;
- (x) = Position at the end of the tournament;

=== League progression ===
League progression
Team	Group matches										Playoffs		
Team	1	2	3	4	5	6	7	8	9	10	Q1/E	Q2	F
Lahore Qalandars	2	2	4	4	4	4	6	8	8	10			

Win	Loss	No result

- Note: The total points at the end of each group match are listed.
- Note: Click on the points (group matches) or W/L (playoffs) to see the match summary.

== Fixtures ==
Match 1
26 March 2026
19:00 (N)
Scorecard

Lahore Qalandars; 199/6 (20 overs)	v	Hyderabad Kingsmen; 130 (20 overs)
Fakhar Zaman 53 (39); Hassan Khan 2/30 (4 overs)		Marnus Labuschagne 26 (22); Haris Rauf 2/22 (4 overs)

Lahore Qalandars won by 69 runs
Gaddafi Stadium, Lahore
Umpires: Ahsan Raza (Pak) and Alex Wharf (Eng)
Player of the match: Fakhar Zaman (Lahore Qalandars)

- Lahore Qalandars won the toss and elected to bat.

Match 6
29 March 2026
19:00 (N)
Scorecard

Lahore Qalandars; 128/9 (20 overs)	v	Karachi Kings; 131/6 (19.3 overs)
Abdullah Shafique 33 (24); Adam Zampa 2/11 (4 overs)		Muhammad Waseem 38 (37); Shaheen Afridi 4/18 (4 overs)

Karachi Kings won by 4 wickets.
Gaddafi Stadium, Lahore
Umpires: Faisal Afridi (Pak) and Sharfuddoula (Ban)
Player of the match: Adam Zampa (Karachi Kings)

- Lahore Qalandars won the toss and elected to bat.
- Karachi Kings were awarded 5 penalty runs for Lahore Qalandars' ball tampering.

Match 11
3 April 2026
19:00 (N)
Scorecard

Lahore Qalandars; 185/5 (13 overs)	v	Multan Sultans; 165/5 (13 overs)
Mohammad Naeem 60 (28); Muhammad Ismail 2/47 (3 overs)		Ashton Turner 52* (22); Mustafizur Rahman 2/37 (3 overs)

Lahore Qalandars won by 20 runs
Gaddafi Stadium, Lahore
Umpires: Chris Gaffaney (NZ) and Tariq Rasheed (Pak)
Player of the match: Mohammad Naeem (Lahore Qalandars)

- Multan Sultans won the toss and elected to field.
- The match was reduced to 13 overs per side due to rain.

Match 16
9 April 2026
14:30
Scorecard

Lahore Qalandars; 100 (18.3 overs)	v	Islamabad United; 104/1 (10.2 overs)
Sikandar Raza 25 (19); Chris Green 3/19 (4 overs)		Devon Conway 59* (35); Shaheen Shah Afridi 1/22 (3 overs)

Islamabad United won by 9 wickets
National Bank Stadium, Karachi
Umpires: Chris Brown (NZ) and Faisal Afridi (Pak)
Player of the match: Chris Green (Islamabad United)

- Islamabad United won the toss and elected to field.

Match 19
11 April 2026
14:30
Scorecard

Peshawar Zalmi; 173/7 (20 overs)	v	Lahore Qalandars; 97 (17 overs)
Kusal Mendis 74 (48); Shaheen Shah Afridi 3/22 (4 overs)		Abdullah Shafique 21 (15); Michael Bracewell 3/18 (4 overs)

Peshawar Zalmi won by 76 runs
National Bank Stadium, Karachi
Umpires: Alex Wharf (Eng) and Asif Yaqoob (Pak)
Player of the match: Kusal Mendis (Peshawar Zalmi)

- Lahore Qalandars won the toss and elected to field.
- Dunith Wellalage (Islamabad United) made his debut in PSL.
- Babar Azam (Peshawar Zalmi) scored his 4,000th run in Pakistan Super League.

Match 26
17 April 2026
19:00 (N)
Scorecard

Lahore Qalandars; 134 (19.5 overs)	v	Quetta Gladiators; 138/4 (16.2 overs)
Haseebullah Khan 33 (37); Usman Tariq 3/18 (4 overs)		Rilee Rossouw 60* (49); Sikandar Raza 1/17 (2 overs)

Quetta Gladiators won by 6 wickets
National Bank Stadium, Karachi
Umpires: Allahudien Paleker (SA) and Chris Brown (NZ)
Player of the match: Usman Tariq (Quetta Gladiators)

- Lahore Qalandars won the toss and elected to bat.
- Charith Asalanka (Lahore Qalandars) made his debut in PSL.
- Peshawar Zalmi qualified for the play-offs as a result of this match.

Match 27
18 April 2026
19:00 (N)
Scorecard

Lahore Qalandars; 210/4 (20 overs)	v	Rawalpindiz; 178/9 (20 overs)
Fakhar Zaman 84 (54); Mohammad Amir 2/25 (4 overs)		Yasir Khan 58 (29); Haris Rauf 3/43 (4 overs)

Lahore Qalandars won by 32 runs
National Bank Stadium, Karachi
Umpires: Allahudien Paleker (SA) and Nasir Hussain (Pak)
Player of the match: Fakhar Zaman (Lahore Qalandars)

- Lahore Qalandars won the toss and elected to bat.
- Rawalpindiz eliminated as a result of this match.

Match 30
21 April 2026
14:30
Scorecard

Lahore Qalandars; 197/6 (20 overs)	v	Quetta Gladiators; 188/7 (20 overs)
Fakhar Zaman 103 (51); Khalil Ahmed 2/38 (4 overs)		Rilee Rossouw 62 (29); Haris Rauf 2/28 (4 overs)

Lahore Qalandars won by 9 runs
Gaddafi Stadium, Lahore
Umpires: Ahsan Raza (Pak) and Allahudien Paleker (SA)
Player of the match: Fakhar Zaman (Lahore Qalandars)

- Lahore Qalandars won the toss and elected to bat.

Match 35
23 April 2026
19:00 (N)
Scorecard

Lahore Qalandars; 199/6 (20 overs)	v	Karachi Kings; 203/5 (18.4 overs)
Abdullah Shafique 63 (36); Moeen Ali 2/26 (4 overs)		David Warner 63* (44); Ubaid Shah 3/41 (4 overs)

Karachi Kings won by 5 wickets
Gaddafi Stadium, Lahore
Umpires: Allahudien Paleker (SA) and Nasir Hussain (Pak)
Player of the match: Khushdil Shah (Karachi Kings)

- Karachi Kings won the toss and elected to field.

Match 38
25 April 2026
19:00 (N)
Scorecard

Peshawar Zalmi; 199/4 (20 overs)	v	Lahore Qalandars; 200/4 (19.3 overs)
Michael Bracewell 83(45); Shaheen Afridi 2/36 (4 overs)		Fakhar Zaman 58* (47); Khurram Shahzad 1/22 (3 overs)

Lahore Qalandars won by 6 wickets
Gaddafi Stadium, Lahore
Umpires: Abdul Muqeet (Pak) and Allahudien Paleker (SA)
Player of the match: Fakhar Zaman (Lahore Qalandars)

- Lahore Qalandars won the toss and elected to field.
- Karachi Kings were eliminated as a result of this match.
- Lahore Qalandars broke Peshawar Zalmi's record of 8-match win streak in Pakistan Super League.

== Controversies ==
=== Security protocol breach ===
On March 28, 2026, Lahore Qalandars captain Shaheen Afridi and teammate Sikandar Raza were involved in a controversy regarding a breach of security protocols at the team hotel. Punjab Police wrote a formal letter to the PSL CEO, in which they said that the players bypassed security personnel to escort four unauthorized visitors to a hotel room. Qalandars team owner Sameen Rana requested permission for the visitors to enter, which was denied by PSL officials due to safety regulations. Despite the refusal, the visitors remained in the room until 1:25 AM, for approximately three hours. Raza later stated he was unaware of the updated protocols, noting that meeting family members at the hotel had been allowed in previous seasons. Police requested a review of the incident, and demanded necessary action to prevent future violations.

=== Ball tampering controversy ===
During match 6 between the Lahore Qalandars and Karachi Kings, the Qalandars were involved in a controversy regarding the alteration of the ball's condition. The on-field umpires found that the team had violated Law 41.3.2 , which deals with ball tampering. As a result, the Qalandars were penalized five runs, which were awarded to the Karachi Kings. The match referee conducted an investigation immediately after the match. During the hearing, Lahore Qalandars player Fakhar Zaman denied the allegations of tampering. The hearing was adjourned till Monday, 30 March.

== Statistics ==
=== Most runs ===
Player	Inns	Runs	Ave	HS	50s	100s
Fakhar Zaman	8	401	57.28	103	4	1
Abdullah Shafique	10	245	24.50	62	1	0
Sikandar Raza	10	162	20.25	40*	0	0

- Source: ESPNcricinfo

=== Most wickets ===
Player	Inns	Wkts	Ave	BBI
Shaheen Shah Afridi	10	16	18.18	4/18
Haris Rauf	9	12	24.08	3/43
Ubaid Shah	8	8	28.50	3/41

- Source: ESPNcricinfo
