= 2026 Pakistan Super League final =

Cricket match

- Match programme cover
- Event: 2026 Pakistan Super League
Hyderabad Kingsmen	Peshawar Zalmi
129	130/5
18 overs	15.2 overs
- Peshawar Zalmi won by 5 wickets
- Date: 03 May 2026
- Venue: Gaddafi Stadium, Lahore
- Player of the match: Aaron Hardie (Peshawar Zalmi)
- Umpires: Ahsan Raza; Chris Gaffaney
- Attendance: 32,461

The 2026 Pakistan Super League final was a Twenty20 cricket match played between Peshawar Zalmi and Hyderabad Kingsmen to determine the champion of the 2026 season of Pakistan Super League (PSL) on 03 May 2026 at Gaddafi Stadium in Lahore, Pakistan.

Peshawar Zalmi beat Hyderabad Kingsmen by five wickets to win their second title. Aaron Hardie was named Player of the Match for his all-round performance, taking 4 wickets and scoring 56 runs.

== Route to the Final ==
League progression
Team	Group matches										Playoffs		
Team	1	2	3	4	5	6	7	8	9	10	Q1/E	Q2	F
Peshawar Zalmi	2	3	5	7	9	11	13	15	17	17	W		W
Hyderabad Kingsmen	0	0	0	0	2	4	6	8	8	10	W	W	L

Win	Loss	No result

- Note: The total points at the end of each group match are listed.
- Note: Click on the points (group matches) or W/L (playoffs) to see the match summary.

=== Group Stage ===
Peshawar Zalmi finished at the top of the 2026 Pakistan Super League points table with 17 points, losing only one match to Lahore Qalandars. While, Hyderabad Kingsmen after losing the first four matches, ended the league stage at 4th place on the points table, securing 10 points.

=== Playoffs ===
In the Qualifier, Peshawar Zalmi beat Islamabad United by 70 runs to reach the final.

Hyderabad Kingsmen defeated Multan Sultans in Eliminator 1 by 8 wickets and Islamabad United in Eliminator 2 by 2 runs to qualify for the final.

== Venue ==
The final was played at Gaddafi Stadium in Lahore on 3 May 2026. It also hosted group stage matches along with National Stadium, Karachi as the tournament was restricted to just two cities to cut down on travel and save fuel because of the economic impact of the 2026 Iran war. Tickets for the match were made available on 27 April 2026. as Government of Pakistan allowed spectators in the ground for playoff matches. Previously fans were not allowed in the stadium during the league stage of the tournament.

Venue in Pakistan
Lahore	2026 Pakistan Super League final (Pakistan)
Gaddafi Stadium	2026 Pakistan Super League final (Pakistan)
Capacity: 34,000	2026 Pakistan Super League final (Pakistan)
Gaddafi Stadium Drone Image	2026 Pakistan Super League final (Pakistan)

== Match ==
=== Match officials ===
- On-field Umpires: Ahsan Raza and Chris Gaffaney
- TV umpire: Alexander Wharf
- Reserve umpire: Asif Yaqoob
- Match referee: Ranjan Madugalle

=== Playing XI ===
- Hyderabad Kingsmen: Marnus Labuschagne (c), Maaz Sadaqat, Saim Ayub, Usman Khan (wk), Irfan Khan, Glenn Maxwell, Kusal Perera, Hassan Khan, Hunain Shah, Mohammad Ali, Akif Javed
- Peshawar Zalmi: Babar Azam (c), Mohammad Haris (wk), Kusal Mendis, Aaron Hardie, Michael Bracewell, Abdul Samad, Farhan Yousaf, Iftikhar Ahmed, Sufiyan Muqeem, Mohammad Basit, Nahid Rana

=== Match details ===
Final
3 May 2026
19:00 (N)
Scorecard

Hyderabad Kingsmen; 129 (18 overs)	v	Peshawar Zalmi; 130/5 (15.2 overs)
Saim Ayub 54 (50); Aaron Hardie 4/27 (4 overs)		Aaron Hardie 56* (39); Mohammad Ali 3/38 (4 overs)

Peshawar Zalmi won by 5 wickets
Gaddafi Stadium, Lahore
Umpires: Ahsan Raza (Pak) and Chris Gaffaney (NZ)
Player of the match: Aaron Hardie (Peshawar Zalmi)

- Peshawar Zalmi won the toss and elected to field.

Match scorecard

Toss: Peshawar Zalmi won the toss and elected to bowl first.

Hyderabad Kingsmen batting
Player	Status	Runs	Balls	4s	6s	Strike rate
Marnus Labuschagne	c †Haris b Hardie	20	12	3	1	166.67
Maaz Sadaqat	c Samad b Basit	11	6	1	1	183.33
Saim Ayub	c Ahmad b Hardie	54	50	5	2	116.28
Usman Khan	lbw b Muqeem	8	6	1	0	133.33
Irfan Khan	run out (Bracewell/Muqeem)	1	2	0	0	50.00
Glenn Maxwell	c Yousaf b Rana	0	1	0	0	0.00
Kusal Perera	run out (Bracewell)	1	2	0	0	50.00
Hassan Khan	c Mendis b Hardie	12	7	1	1	171.43
Hunain Shah	b Rana	9	12	0	1	75.00
Mohammad Ali	not out	1	7	0	0	14.28
Akif Javed	c †Haris b Hardie	5	4	1	0	125.00
Extras 7 (lb 3, nb 1, wd 3); Total 129/10 (18 overs)				12	6	7.16 RR

Fall of wickets: 1/16 (Maaz Sadaqat, 1.2 ov) · 2/51 (Marnus Labuschagne, 4.4 ov) · 3/71 (Usman Khan, 6.3 ov) · 4/72 (Irfan Khan, 6.6 ov) · 5/72 (Glenn Maxwell, 7.1 ov) · 6/73 (Kusal Perera, 7.5 ov) · 7/90 (Hassan Khan, 9.5 ov) · 8/108 (Hunain Shah, 13.5 ov) · 9/123 (Saim Ayub, 17.1 ov) · 10/129 (Akif Javed, 17.6 ov)

Peshawar Zalmi bowling
Bowler	Overs	Maidens	Runs	Wickets	Econ	Wides	NBs
Iftikhar Ahmed	2	0	21	0	10.50	0	0
Mohammad Basit	3	0	22	1	7.33	0	0
Aaron Hardie	4	0	27	4	6.75	2	0
Nahid Rana	4	1	22	2	5.50	0	1
Sufiyan Muqeem	4	0	23	1	5.75	1	0
Michael Bracewell	4	0	11	0	11.00	0	0

Target: 130 runs from 20 overs at 6.50 RR

Peshawar Zalmi batting
Player	Status	Runs	Balls	4s	6s	Strike rate
Mohammad Haris	c Labuschagne b Ali	6	3	1	0	200.00
Babar Azam	c †Khan b Ali	0	1	0	0	0.00
Kusal Mendis	c Sadaqat b Shah	9	8	2	0	112.50
Aaron Hardie	not out	56	39	9	0	143.58
Michael Bracewell	c †Khan b Javed	4	5	1	0	80.00
Abdul Samad	c Maxwell b Ali	48	34	3	4	141.17
Farhan Yousaf	not out	4	2	1	0	200.00
Iftikhar Ahmed						
Sufiyan Muqeem						
Mohammad Basit Ali						
Nahid Rana						
Extras 3 (lb 2, wd 1); Total 130/5 (15.2 overs)				17	4	8.47 RR

Fall of wickets: 1/6 (Mohammad Haris, 0.3 ov) · 2/7 (Babar Azam, 0.5 ov) · 3/33 (Kusal Mendis, 3.2 ov) · 4/40 (Michael Bracewell, 4.5 ov) · 5/125 (Abdul Samad, 14.5 ov)

Hyderabad Kingsmen bowling
Bowler	Overs	Maidens	Runs	Wickets	Econ	Wides	NBs
Mohammad Ali	4	0	38	3	9.50	0	0
Akif Javed	4	0	29	1	7.25	0	0
Hunain Shah	3.2	0	26	1	7.80	1	0
Hassan Khan	3	0	22	0	7.33	0	0
Saim Ayub	1	0	13	0	13.00	0	0

Result: Peshawar Zalmi won by 5 wickets
