= 2026 Pakistan Super League =

11th edition of the Pakistan Super League

2026 Pakistan Super League پاکستان سپر لیگ ۲۰۲۶
- Official logo of HBL PSL 11 (Note: Official nomenclature)
- Dates: 26 March – 3 May 2026
- Administrator: Pakistan Cricket Board
- Cricket format: Twenty20
- Tournament format(s): Group round-robin and play-offs
- Host: Pakistan
- Champions: Peshawar Zalmi (2nd title)
- Runners-up: Hyderabad Kingsmen
- Participants: 08
- Matches: 44
- Player of the series: Sufiyan Muqeem (PZ)
- Most runs: Babar Azam (PZ) (588)
- Most wickets: Sufiyan Muqeem (PZ) (22)
- Official website: psl-t20.com

The 2026 Pakistan Super League (branded as HBL PSL 11) was the eleventh edition of the Pakistan Super League, a professional Twenty20 cricket league organised by the Pakistan Cricket Board (PCB). This season marked the league's expansion from six to eight franchises, with Hyderabad Kingsmen and Rawalpindiz joining as new teams. It was played from 26 March to 3 May 2026, with 44 matches held in Karachi and Lahore.

Peshawar Zalmi won the tournament, defeating debutant Hyderabad Kingsmen by five wickets in the final to win their second PSL title.

== Background ==
After the conclusion of the tenth season in 2025, the initial ten-year franchise agreements for the six original teams expired. The Pakistan Cricket Board (PCB) engaged Ernst & Young to conduct a valuation of the league's assets to set new terms for the next decade (2026–2035). In October 2025, HBL Pakistan renewed its title sponsorship for PSL for the next two years.

In November 2025, five of the then-existing six franchises successfully renewed their contracts under the new financial model except Multan Sultans. As part of the PCB's plan to expand the league from six to eight teams, an auction for two new franchises was held on 8 January 2026. Six cities were shortlisted for consideration: Faisalabad, Gilgit, Hyderabad, Muzaffarabad, Rawalpindi and Sialkot. Following the auction, Hyderabad Kingsmen and Sialkot were selected as the seventh and eighth teams, with ownership rights acquired by FKS Group and OZ Developers respectively.

Ali Tareen, previous owner of Multan Sultans franchise, announced that he would not renew his agreement with the PCB, and cited financial losses and disagreements regarding the league's management. Thus, PCB decided to resell the franchise through an auction on 9 February 2026, where Walee Technologies acquired it and rebranded the identity to Rawalpindiz after relocating. Later, Sialkot owners sold the franchise to CD Ventures, who rebranded and brought back the Multan Sultans.

=== Trophy ===
The trophy for the season was named "Infinity". Designed by Hanif Jewellers, it was handcrafted by 18 artisans. It featured a circular base with eight emerald-cut jewels representing eight teams. It had two golden curved arms rising to hold a crescent and a star along with hundreds of small crystals. It was revealed on 11 March at National Bank Stadium, Karachi, and toured across the country.

=== Prize money ===
The champions received US$500,000, while the runner-up team received US$300,000. Moreover, a US$200,000 reward was awarded to the "best franchise contributing towards cricket development".

== Teams and squads ==
The player auction for the eleventh season was held on 11 February 2026 in Lahore, Pakistan. It was the first time in PSL history that players were selected through an auction system, replacing the draft method that had been used since the league began in 2016. Team purse was capped at Rs. 45 crore and was allowed to be extended to Rs. 50.5 crore to allow direct signing of one foreign player who had not featured in a previous season. Franchises were allowed to retain up to four players, one in each category before the auction; new franchises were allowed to sign four players to match the retentions of the other six franchises. 888 players, including local and foreign, registered for the auction at 4 different base prices.

Rawalpindiz signed Pakistani pacer Naseem Shah for Rs. 8.65 crore, making him the most expensive player in the auction. Additionally, they secured New Zealand all-rounder Daryl Mitchell for Rs. 8 crore, the most expensive overseas signing. Player transfer window was opened from 12 March to 18 March, allowing franchises to trade players. Multan Sultans' salary cap was increased by Rs. 1.2 crore to allow two additional signings, making the full squad of 22 players.

On 26 March, the PCB introduced a new rule that each captain could submit two sets of first XI to the referee before beginning the match.

Squads

Hyderabad Kingsmen	Islamabad United	Karachi Kings	Lahore Qalandars
Marnus Labuschagne (Australia) (c); Saim Ayub; Hassan Khan; Usman Khan (wk); Glenn Maxwell (Australia); Akif Javed; Maaz Sadaqat; Mohammad Ali; Kusal Perera (Sri Lanka); Irfan Khan Niazi; Shayan Jahangir; Hammad Azam; Asif Mehmood; Hunain Shah; Riley Meredith (Australia); Sharjeel Khan; Rizwan Mehmood; Saad Ali; Tayyab Arif; Ahmed Hussain; Maheesh Theekshana (Sri Lanka); Saad Khan	Shadab Khan (c); Andries Gous (United States); Chris Green (Australia); Devon Conway (New Zealand); Faheem Ashraf; Mehran Mumtaz; Mark Chapman (New Zealand); Imad Wasim; Mir Hamza Sajjad; Sameer Minhas; Sameen Gul; Haider Ali; Richard Gleeson (England); Mohammad Hasnain; Dipendra Singh Airee (Nepal); Mohammad Faiq; Salman Irshad; Salman Mirza; Nisar Ahmad; Mohsin Riaz; Muhammad Jawadullah (United Arab Emirates); Mubasir Khan	David Warner (Australia) (c); Hassan Ali; Abbas Afridi; Khushdil Shah; Saad Baig; Moeen Ali (England); Azam Khan; Salman Ali Agha; Shahid Aziz; Mir Hamza; Adam Zampa (Australia); Mohammad Hamza Sohail; Aqib Ilyas (Oman); Khuzaima Tanveer; Muhammad Waseem (United Arab Emirates); Ihsanullah; Rizwan Ullah; Reeza Hendricks (South Africa); Haroon Arshad; Faham-ul-Haq; Omair Yousuf; Jason Roy (England)	Shaheen Shah Afridi (c); Abdullah Shafique; Sikandar Raza (Zimbabwe); Muhammad Naeem; Mustafizur Rahman (Bangladesh); Haris Rauf; Usama Mir; Fakhar Zaman; Ubaid Shah; Haseebullah Khan; Mohammad Farooq; Parvez Hossain Emon (Bangladesh); Asif Ali; Tayyab Tahir; Rubin Hermann (South Africa); Dunith Wellalage (Sri Lanka); Maaz Khan; Shahab Khan; Daniel Sams (Australia); Ryan Burl (Zimbabwe); Hussain Talat; Charith Asalanka (Sri Lanka)
Multan Sultans	Peshawar Zalmi	Quetta Gladiators	Rawalpindiz
Ashton Turner (Australia) (c); Shan Masood; Steve Smith (Australia); Mohammad Nawaz; Sahibzada Farhan; Mohammad Wasim Jr.; Peter Siddle (Australia); Tabraiz Shamsi (South Africa); Lachlan Shaw (Australia); Delano Potgieter (South Africa); Josh Philippe (Australia); Momin Qamar; Mohammad Awais Zafar; Mohammad Shehzad; Mohammad Ismail; Arshad Iqbal; Atizaz Habib Khan; Faisal Akram; Arafat Minhas; Mohammad Imran Randhawa; Shehzad Gul; Mohammad Huraira	Babar Azam (c); Sufiyan Muqeem; Abdul Samad; Ali Raza; Aaron Hardie (Australia); Aamir Jamal; Khurram Shahzad; Mohammad Haris; Khalid Usman; Abdul Subhan; James Vince (England); Michael Bracewell (New Zealand); Kusal Mendis (Sri Lanka); Iftikhar Ahmed; Nahid Rana (Bangladesh); Mirza Tahir Baig; Kashif Ali; Shahnawaz Dahani; Farhan Yousaf; Mohammad Basit; Shoriful Islam (Bangladesh); Tanzid Hasan (Bangladesh); Brian Bennett (Zimbabwe); Umar Akmal; Mehran Mumtaz	Saud Shakeel (c); Abrar Ahmed; Hassan Nawaz; Usman Tariq; Shamyl Hussain; Rilee Rossouw (South Africa); Jahandad Khan; Khawaja Nafay; Wasim Akram Jr.; Khan Zaib; Bismillah Khan; Saqib Khan; Brett Hampton (New Zealand); Sam Harper (Australia); Bevon Jacobs (New Zealand); Ben McDermott (Australia); Tom Curran (England); Jahanzaib Sultan; Ahmed Daniyal; Alzarri Joseph (Cricket West Indies); Ahsan Ali; Ali Khan (United States); Abdul Bangalzai	Mohammad Rizwan (c, wk); Sam Billings (England); Yasir Khan; Naseem Shah; Rishad Hossain (Bangladesh); Daryl Mitchell (New Zealand); Mohammad Amir; Abdullah Fazal; Amad Butt; Dian Forrester (South Africa); Kamran Ghulam; Fawad Ali; Mohammad Amir Khan; Asif Afridi; Shahzaib Khan; Saad Masood; Jalat Khan; Cole McConchie (New Zealand); Usman Khawaja (Australia); Imam-ul-Haq; Sajid Khan; Abdul Faseeh; Ben Sears (New Zealand)

== Venues ==
The PCB revealed the venue details on 10 March 2026. Lahore hosted the opening match as well as the final.

Initially the tournament was scheduled to be held across six cities, but due to the economic impact of the 2026 Iran war, the Government of Pakistan (GoP) and Pakistan Cricket Board (PCB) announced on 22 March that the tournament would be played in only two cities, Lahore and Karachi, temporarily behind closed doors to reduce movement to save fuel. The opening ceremony was also cancelled. Later, on the request of franchise owners, Prime Minister Shehbaz Sharif allowed the fans to attend the playoffs and the final.

Venues:

- Gaddafi Stadium, Lahore
- National Bank Stadium, Karachi

== Match officials ==
On 23 March 2026, the PCB announced the list of fifteen umpires and eight match referees for the league stage. They included four members of the Elite Panel of ICC Umpires and nine of the PCB domestic umpires. Roshan Mahanama returned to extend his record of 71 matches as a match referee in the PSL. Richie Richardson, Allahudien Paleker, and Sharfuddoula made their first appearances as match officials in PSL. Alex Wharf and Ahsan Raza were named as on-field umpires for the opening match with Asif Yaqoob as television umpire and Tariq Rasheed as fourth umpire.

=== Match referees ===
- Richie Richardson
- Roshan Mahanama
- Ali Naqvi
- Kamran Chaudhary
- Bilal Khilji
- Aleem Moosa
- Iftikhar Ahmed
- Sohail Idrees

=== Umpires ===
- Ahsan Raza
- Chris Gaffaney
- Sharfuddoula Saikat
- Allahudien Paleker
- Alex Wharf
- Chris Brown
- Asif Yaqoob
- Rashid Riaz
- Faisal Afridi
- Zulfiqar Jan
- Nasir Hussain
- Abdul Muqeet
- Alay Haider
- Tariq Rasheed
- Imran Javed

== Marketing ==
The season's logo variant was revealed on 4 March, with an official nomenclature, HBL PSL 11, and the official anthem was released on 24 March, titled "Khelenge Beat Pe".

=== Broadcast ===
In February 2026, PCB held three bids for broadcasting rights; however, the rights for India were withheld. Walee Technologies, who were also the owners of the Rawalpindiz franchise, won all bids, including the international rights, with a 149 percent increase in value as compared to the previous rights cycle, although the official financial figures were not disclosed. Also, the local broadcasting and streaming rights were sold for Rs. 2,611 crore for a four-year period.

The names for the commentary panel and presenters were revealed on 23 March. Notably, Shoaib Malik made his debut in Urdu commentary after retiring from the game, as he had played in the previous ten seasons. Due to no on-field spectators, this edition was a watch-from-home event, having a dedicated Urdu feed along with a match analysis talk show which was introduced for the first time.

== League stage ==
=== Format ===
Due to the expansion to eight teams, this edition was played under a revised format with a total of 44 matches, replacing the double round-robin format used in previous editions. The teams were divided into two virtual groups of four; each team played twice against the other teams in its group and once against each team in the opposite group, resulting in a total of ten league-stage matches per team. The top four teams in the overall standings qualified for the playoffs, which were played under the page playoff system to determine the champion.

=== Points table ===
Pos	Team	Pld	W	L	NR	Pts	NRR	Qualification
1	Peshawar Zalmi (C)	10	8	1	1	17	2.324	Advanced to the Qualifier
2	Islamabad United (3rd)	10	6	3	1	13	1.667	Advanced to the Qualifier
3	Multan Sultans (4th)	10	6	4	0	12	0.326	Advanced to the Eliminator 1
4	Hyderabad Kingsmen (R)	10	5	5	0	10	−0.361	Advanced to the Eliminator 1
5	Lahore Qalandars	10	5	5	0	10	−0.482	Eliminated
6	Karachi Kings	10	5	5	0	10	−0.869	Eliminated
7	Quetta Gladiators	10	3	7	0	6	−0.410	Eliminated
8	Rawalpindiz	10	1	9	0	2	−1.760	Eliminated

Source: ESPNcricinfo

Notes

- C = Champions;
- R = Runners-up;
- (x) = Position at the end of the tournament;

=== League progression ===
Team	Group matches										Playoffs		
Team	1	2	3	4	5	6	7	8	9	10	E1/Q	E2	F
Hyderabad Kingsmen	0	0	0	0	2	4	6	8	8	10	W	W	L
Islamabad United	0	1	3	5	7	7	9	9	11	13	L	L	
Karachi Kings	2	4	6	6	6	6	6	6	8	10			
Lahore Qalandars	2	2	4	4	4	4	6	8	8	10			
Multan Sultans	2	4	4	6	8	8	10	12	12	12	L		
Peshawar Zalmi	2	3	5	7	9	11	13	15	17	17	W		W
Quetta Gladiators	0	2	2	2	4	4	6	6	6	6			
Rawalpindiz	0	0	0	0	0	0	0	0	2	2			

Win	Loss	No result

- Note: The total points at the end of each group match are listed.
- Note: Click on the points (group matches) or W/L (playoffs) to see the match summary.

=== League summary ===
Visitor team →	HK	IU	KK	LQ	MS	PZ	QG	RP
Home team ↓	HK	IU	KK	LQ	MS	PZ	QG	RP
Hyderabad Kingsmen		Hyderabad; 6 wickets			Hyderabad; 4 wickets	Peshawar; 4 wickets		Hyderabad; 5 wickets
Islamabad United	Islamabad; 8 wickets				Islamabad; 4 wickets	Match abandoned		Pindiz; 6 wickets
Karachi Kings	Hyderabad; 4 wickets	Islamabad; 8 wickets		Karachi; 5 wickets	Multan; 11 runs	Peshawar; 159 runs	Karachi; 14 runs	
Lahore Qalandars	Lahore; 69 runs	Islamabad; 9 wickets	Karachi; 4 wickets			Lahore; 6 wickets	Quetta; 6 wickets	
Multan Sultans	Multan; 6 wickets	Multan; 5 wickets		Lahore; 20 runs				Multan; 7 wickets
Peshawar Zalmi			Peshawar; 7 wickets	Peshawar; 76 runs	Peshawar; 24 runs		Peshawar; 8 wickets	Peshawar; 5 wickets
Quetta Gladiators	Quetta; 40 runs	Islamabad; 8 wickets	Karachi; 9 wickets	Lahore; 9 runs	Multan; 6 wickets	Peshawar; 118 runs		
Rawalpindiz	Hyderabad; 108 runs	Islamabad; 7 wickets	Karachi; 5 wickets	Lahore; 32 runs	Multan; 6 wickets		Quetta; 61 runs	

Home team won	Visitor team won

- Note: Results listed are according to the home (horizontal) and visitor (vertical) teams.
- Note: Click on a result to see a summary of the match.

== Fixtures ==
The schedule was planned following the completion of the 2026 Men's T20 World Cup, which was held during February and March, and the league also coincided with the 2026 Indian Premier League. The PCB announced a revised schedule on 22 March 2026.

Match 1
26 March 2026
19:00 (N)
Scorecard

Lahore Qalandars; 199/6 (20 overs)	v	Hyderabad Kingsmen; 130 (20 overs)
Fakhar Zaman 53 (39); Hassan Khan 2/30 (4 overs)		Marnus Labuschagne 26 (22); Haris Rauf 2/22 (4 overs)

Lahore Qalandars won by 69 runs
Gaddafi Stadium, Lahore
Umpires: Ahsan Raza (Pak) and Alex Wharf (Eng)
Player of the match: Fakhar Zaman (Lahore Qalandars)

- Lahore Qalandars won the toss and elected to bat.

Match 2
27 March 2026
19:00 (N)
Scorecard

Karachi Kings; 181/7 (20 overs)	v	Quetta Gladiators; 167/7 (20 overs)
Moeen Ali 48* (29); Ahmed Daniyal 3/36 (4 overs)		Shamyl Hussain 52 (24); Hassan Ali 4/27 (4 overs)

Karachi Kings won by 14 runs.
Gaddafi Stadium, Lahore
Umpires: Sharfuddoula (Ban) and Tariq Rasheed (Pak)
Player of the match: Moeen Ali (Karachi Kings)

- Quetta Gladiators won the toss and elected to field.

Match 3
28 March 2026
14:30
Scorecard

Rawalpindiz; 214/4 (20 overs)	v	Peshawar Zalmi; 218/5 (19.1 overs)
Yasir Khan 83 (46); Ali Raza 2/42 (3 overs)		Mohammad Haris 47 (28); Amad Butt 2/45 (4 overs)

Peshawar Zalmi won by 5 wickets.
Gaddafi Stadium, Lahore
Umpires: Alex Wharf (Eng) and Faisal Afridi (Pak)
Player of the match: Michael Bracewell (Peshawar Zalmi)

- Rawalpindiz won the toss and elected to bat.

Match 4
28 March 2026
19:00 (N)
Scorecard

Islamabad United; 171/8 (20 overs)	v	Multan Sultans; 175/5 (18.4 overs)
Mark Chapman 40 (21); Momin Qamar 3/24 (3 overs)		Josh Philippe 55 (35); Salman Irshad 2/28 (4 overs)

Multan Sultans won by 5 wickets.
Gaddafi Stadium, Lahore
Umpires: Sharfuddoula (Ban) and Ahsan Raza (Pak)
Player of the match: Momin Qamar (Multan Sultans)

- Multan Sultans won the toss and elected to field.

Match 5
29 March 2026
14:30
Scorecard

Quetta Gladiators; 174/8 (20 overs)	v	Hyderabad Kingsmen; 134/8 (20 overs)
Shamyl Hussain 54 (41); Riley Meredith 3/38 (4 overs)		Irfan Khan Niazi 33 (25); Abrar Ahmed 3/23 (4 overs)

Quetta Gladiators won by 40 runs.
Gaddafi Stadium, Lahore
Umpires: Ahsan Raza (Pak) and Alex Wharf (Eng)
Player of the match: Shamyl Hussain (Quetta Gladiators)

- Quetta Gladiators won the toss and elected to bat.

Match 6
29 March 2026
19:00 (N)
Scorecard

Lahore Qalandars; 128/9 (20 overs)	v	Karachi Kings; 131/6 (19.3 overs)
Abdullah Shafique 33 (24); Adam Zampa 2/11 (4 overs)		Muhammad Waseem 38 (37); Shaheen Afridi 4/18 (4 overs)

Karachi Kings won by 4 wickets.
Gaddafi Stadium, Lahore
Umpires: Faisal Afridi (Pak) and Sharfuddoula (Ban)
Player of the match: Adam Zampa (Karachi Kings)

- Lahore Qalandars won the toss and elected to bat.
- Karachi Kings were awarded 5 penalty runs for Lahore Qalandars' ball tampering.

Match 7
31 March 2026
19:00 (N)
Scorecard

Islamabad United	v	Peshawar Zalmi

Match abandoned
Gaddafi Stadium, Lahore
Umpires: Ahsan Raza (Pak) and Asif Yaqoob (Pak)

- No toss.
- No play was possible due to rain.

Match 8
1 April 2026
19:00 (N)
Scorecard

Hyderabad Kingsmen; 225/5 (20 overs)	v	Multan Sultans; 227/4 (18.4 overs)
Maaz Sadaqat 62 (26); Mohammad Wasim Jr. 2/37 (4 overs)		Sahibzada Farhan 106* (57); Saim Ayub 2/43 (3 overs)

Multan Sultans won by 6 wickets
Gaddafi Stadium, Lahore
Umpires: Asif Yaqoob (Pak) and Chris Gaffaney (NZ)
Player of the match: Sahibzada Farhan (Multan Sultans)

- Hyderabad Kingsmen won the toss and elected to bat.

Match 9
2 April 2026
14:30
Scorecard

Quetta Gladiators; 183/5 (20 overs)	v	Islamabad United; 189/2 (18.2 overs)
Hasan Nawaz 66 (36); Shadab Khan 3/23 (4 overs)		Sameer Minhas 82* (48); Abrar Ahmed 2/29 (4 overs)

Islamabad United won by 8 wickets
Gaddafi Stadium, Lahore
Umpires: Alex Wharf (Eng) and Rashid Riaz (Pak)
Player of the match: Shadab Khan (Islamabad United)

- Quetta Gladiators won the toss and elected to bat.

Match 10
2 April 2026
19:00 (N)
Scorecard

Rawalpindiz; 197/6 (20 overs)	v	Karachi Kings; 199/5 (19.2 overs)
Daryl Mitchell 65 (41); Hasan Ali 3/24 (4 overs)		Azam Khan 74 (34); Daryl Mitchell 3/32 (3.2 overs)

Karachi Kings won by 5 wickets
Gaddafi Stadium, Lahore
Umpires: Ahsan Raza (Pak) and Asif Yaqoob (Pak)
Player of the match: Azam Khan (Karachi Kings)

- Karachi Kings won the toss and elected to field.

Match 11
3 April 2026
19:00 (N)
Scorecard

Lahore Qalandars; 185/5 (13 overs)	v	Multan Sultans; 165/5 (13 overs)
Mohammad Naeem 60 (28); Muhammad Ismail 2/47 (3 overs)		Ashton Turner 52* (22); Mustafizur Rahman 2/37 (3 overs)

Lahore Qalandars won by 20 runs
Gaddafi Stadium, Lahore
Umpires: Chris Gaffaney (NZ) and Tariq Rasheed (Pak)
Player of the match: Mohammad Naeem (Lahore Qalandars)

- Multan Sultans won the toss and elected to field.
- The match was reduced to 13 overs per side due to rain.

Match 12
4 April 2026
19:00 (N)
Scorecard

Rawalpindiz; 156/7 (20 overs)	v	Islamabad United; 157/3 (14.2 overs)
Kamran Ghulam 50 (39); Richard Gleeson 2/21 (4 overs)		Sameer Minhas 70 (36); Mohammad Amir 1/18 (3 overs)

Islamabad United won by 7 wickets
Gaddafi Stadium, Lahore
Umpires: Abdul Muqeet (Pak) and Alex Wharf (Eng)
Player of the match: Sameer Minhas (Islamabad United)

- Islamabad United won the toss and elected to field.
- Mohammad Faiq (Islamabad United) made his debut in PSL.

Match 13
5 April 2026
19:00 (N)
Scorecard

Quetta Gladiators; 166/7 (20 overs)	v	Multan Sultans; 167/4 (17.3 overs)
Saud Shakeel 56 (41); Mohammad Nawaz 3/30 (4 overs)		Steve Smith 53 (35); Hassan Nawaz 2/17 (2 overs)

Multan Sultans won by 6 wickets
Gaddafi Stadium, Lahore
Umpires: Chris Gaffaney (NZ) and Faisal Afridi (Pak)
Player of the match: Mohammad Nawaz (Multan Sultans)

- Multan Sultans won the toss and elected to field.

Match 14
6 April 2026
19:00 (N)
Scorecard

Rawalpindiz; 182/8 (20 overs)	v	Multan Sultans; 186/3 (16.2 overs)
Sam Billings 56* (41); Faisal Akram 4/31 (4 overs)		Sahibzada Farhan 68 (38); Mohammad Amir 2/32 (3 overs)

Multan Sultans won by 7 wickets
Gaddafi Stadium, Lahore
Umpires: Abdul Muqeet (Pak) and Sharfuddoula (Ban)
Player of the match: Faisal Akram (Multan Sultans)

- Multan Sultans won the toss and elected to field.

Match 15
8 April 2026
19:00 (N)
Scorecard

Hyderabad Kingsmen; 145 (18.2 overs)	v	Peshawar Zalmi; 146/6 (20 overs)
Kusal Perera 58 (35); Iftikhar Ahmed 4/21 (4 overs)		Babar Azam 43 (37); Saim Ayub 2/19 (4 overs)

Peshawar Zalmi won by 4 wickets
National Bank Stadium, Karachi
Umpires: Aaley Haider (Pak) and Sharfuddoula (Ban)
Player of the match: Iftikhar Ahmed (Peshawar Zalmi)

- Peshawar Zalmi won the toss and elected to field.

Match 16
9 April 2026
14:30
Scorecard

Lahore Qalandars; 100 (18.3 overs)	v	Islamabad United; 104/1 (10.2 overs)
Sikandar Raza 25 (19); Chris Green 3/19 (4 overs)		Devon Conway 59* (35); Shaheen Shah Afridi 1/22 (3 overs)

Islamabad United won by 9 wickets
National Bank Stadium, Karachi
Umpires: Chris Brown (NZ) and Faisal Afridi (Pak)
Player of the match: Chris Green (Islamabad United)

- Islamabad United won the toss and elected to field.

Match 17
9 April 2026
19:00 (N)
Scorecard

Peshawar Zalmi; 246/3 (20 overs)	v	Karachi Kings; 87 (16.1 overs)
Kusal Mendis 109 (52); Abbas Afridi 2/55 (4 overs)		Azam Khan 25 (27); Nahid Rana 3/7 (4 overs)

Peshawar Zalmi won by 159 runs
National Bank Stadium, Karachi
Umpires: Chris Gaffaney (NZ) and Rashid Riaz (Pak)
Player of the match: Kusal Mendis (Peshawar Zalmi)

- Karachi Kings won the toss and elected to field.
- Babar Azam (Peshawar Zalmi) became the fastest batter to score 12,000 runs in T20s.
- Kusal Mendis (Peshawar Zalmi) scored his maiden century in Pakistan Super League and became the first player from Sri Lanka to score a century in Pakistan Super League.
- The 191-run partnership between Kusal Mendis and Babar Azam (Peshawar Zalmi) became the highest partnership for any wicket in the Pakistan Super League.
- Peshawar Zalmi scored their highest total in Pakistan Super League.
- Karachi Kings scored their lowest total in Pakistan Super League.
- Peshawar Zalmi recorded the largest win by runs in Pakistan Super League.

Match 18
10 April 2026
19:00 (N)
Scorecard

Quetta Gladiators; 182/6 (20 overs)	v	Rawalpindiz; 121 (17.3 overs)
Rilee Rossouw 53 (42); Ben Sears 3/41 (4 overs)		Saad Masood 31 (19); Saud Shakeel 2/4 (1 over)

Quetta Gladiators won by 61 runs
National Bank Stadium, Karachi
Umpires: Imran Javed (Pak) and Sharfuddoula (Ban)
Player of the match: Rilee Rossouw (Quetta Gladiators)

- Rawalpindiz won the toss and elected to field.

Match 19
11 April 2026
14:30
Scorecard

Peshawar Zalmi; 173/7 (20 overs)	v	Lahore Qalandars; 97 (17 overs)
Kusal Mendis 74 (48); Shaheen Shah Afridi 3/22 (4 overs)		Abdullah Shafique 21 (15); Michael Bracewell 3/18 (4 overs)

Peshawar Zalmi won by 76 runs
National Bank Stadium, Karachi
Umpires: Alex Wharf (Eng) and Asif Yaqoob (Pak)
Player of the match: Kusal Mendis (Peshawar Zalmi)

- Lahore Qalandars won the toss and elected to field.
- Dunith Wellalage (Islamabad United) made his debut in PSL.
- Babar Azam (Peshawar Zalmi) scored his 4,000th run in Pakistan Super League.

Match 20
11 April 2026
19:00 (N)
Scorecard

Karachi Kings; 188/8 (20 overs)	v	Hyderabad Kingsmen; 189/6 (19.1 overs)
Saad Baig 53 (37); Hunain Shah 3/19 (4 overs)		Maaz Sadaqat 37 (29); Abbas Afridi 2/30 (4 overs)

Hyderabad Kingsmen won by 4 wickets
National Bank Stadium, Karachi
Umpires: Sharfuddoula (Ban) and Zulfiqar Jan (Pak)
Player of the match: Hassan Khan (Hyderabad Kingsmen)

- Hyderabad Kingsmen won the toss and elected to field.
- Hyderabad Kingsmen recorded their first win in Pakistan Super League.

Match 21
12 April 2026
19:00 (N)
Scorecard

Islamabad United; 153/9 (20 overs)	v	Hyderabad Kingsmen; 157/4 (18.1 overs)
Devon Conway 45 (31); Asif Mehmood 4/18 (2 overs)		Marnus Labuschagne 61* (53); Chris Green 2/19 (4 overs)

Hyderabad Kingsmen won by 6 wickets
National Bank Stadium, Karachi
Umpires: Chris Gaffaney (NZ) and Nasir Hussain (Pak)
Player of the match: Marnus Labuschagne (Hyderabad Kingsmen)

- Hyderabad Kingsmen won the toss and elected to field.

Match 22
13 April 2026
19:00 (N)
Scorecard

Peshawar Zalmi; 196/6 (20 overs)	v	Multan Sultans; 172/8 (20 overs)
Kusal Mendis 68 (40); Muhammad Ismail 2/22 (3 overs)		Shan Masood 35 (19); Sufiyan Muqeem 3/30 (4 overs)

Peshawar Zalmi won by 24 runs
National Bank Stadium, Karachi
Umpires: Alex Wharf (Eng) and Rashid Riaz (Pak)
Player of the match: Sufiyan Muqeem (Peshawar Zalmi)

- Multan Sultans won the toss and elected to field.

Match 23
15 April 2026
19:00 (N)
Scorecard

Quetta Gladiators; 154 (20 overs)	v	Peshawar Zalmi; 156/2 (18.3 overs)
Hasan Nawaz 37 (35); Sufiyan Muqeem 3/25 (4 overs)		Babar Azam 71* (51); Saud Shakeel 1/23 (3 overs)

Peshawar Zalmi won by 8 wickets
National Bank Stadium, Karachi
Umpires: Chris Brown (NZ) and Rashid Riaz (Pak)
Player of the match: Sufiyan Muqeem (Peshawar Zalmi)

- Peshawar Zalmi won the toss and elected to field.
- Mohammad Basit (Peshawar Zalmi) made his debut in PSL.
- Rilee Rossouw (Quetta Gladiators) became the first overseas player to play 100 matches in the PSL.
- Babar Azam (Peshawar Zalmi) scored his 100th half-century in T20s.

Match 24
16 April 2026
14:30
Scorecard

Rawalpindiz; 121/9 (20 overs)	v	Hyderabad Kingsmen; 123/5 (16.3 overs)
Sam Billings 26 (22); Hunain Shah 3/18 (4 overs)		Irfan Khan Niazi 34* (29); Asif Afridi 2/20 (4 overs)

Hyderabad Kingsmen won by 5 wickets
National Bank Stadium, Karachi
Umpires: Chris Brown (NZ) and Tariq Rasheed (Pak)
Player of the match: Hunain Shah (Hyderabad Kingsmen)

- Hyderabad Kingsmen won the toss and elected to field.
- Glenn Maxwell (Hyderabad Kingsmen) took his 200th wicket in T20s.

Match 25
16 April 2026
19:00 (N)
Scorecard

Karachi Kings; 150/6 (20 overs)	v	Islamabad United; 123/5 (16.3 overs)
Reeza Hendricks 51* (44); Richard Gleeson 2/22 (4 overs)		Sameer Minhas 58 (36); Moeen Ali 1/14 (2 overs)

Islamabad United won by 8 wickets
National Bank Stadium, Karachi
Umpires: Asif Yaqoob (Pak) and Chris Gaffaney (NZ)
Player of the match: Sameer Minhas (Islamabad United)

- Islamabad United won the toss and elected to field.
- Dipendra Singh Airee (Islamabad United) made his debut in PSL as a substitute player.

Match 26
17 April 2026
19:00 (N)
Scorecard

Lahore Qalandars; 134 (19.5 overs)	v	Quetta Gladiators; 138/4 (16.2 overs)
Haseebullah Khan 33 (37); Usman Tariq 3/18 (4 overs)		Rilee Rossouw 60* (49); Sikandar Raza 1/17 (2 overs)

Quetta Gladiators won by 6 wickets
National Bank Stadium, Karachi
Umpires: Allahudien Paleker (SA) and Chris Brown (NZ)
Player of the match: Usman Tariq (Quetta Gladiators)

- Lahore Qalandars won the toss and elected to bat.
- Charith Asalanka (Lahore Qalandars) made his debut in PSL.
- Peshawar Zalmi qualified for the play-offs as a result of this match.

Match 27
18 April 2026
19:00 (N)
Scorecard

Lahore Qalandars; 210/4 (20 overs)	v	Rawalpindiz; 178/9 (20 overs)
Fakhar Zaman 84 (54); Mohammad Amir 2/25 (4 overs)		Yasir Khan 58 (29); Haris Rauf 3/43 (4 overs)

Lahore Qalandars won by 32 runs
National Bank Stadium, Karachi
Umpires: Allahudien Paleker (SA) and Nasir Hussain (Pak)
Player of the match: Fakhar Zaman (Lahore Qalandars)

- Lahore Qalandars won the toss and elected to bat.
- Rawalpindiz eliminated as a result of this match.

Match 28
19 April 2026
14:30
Scorecard

Karachi Kings; 207/7 (20 overs)	v	Multan Sultans; 196 (19.4 overs)
Shan Masood 46 (25); Khushdil Shah 3/35 (4 overs)		Reeza Hendricks 49 (32); Arafat Minhas 3/32 (3 overs)

Multan Sultans won by 11 runs
National Bank Stadium, Karachi
Umpires: Asif Yaqoob (Pak) and Chris Gaffaney (NZ)
Player of the match: Arafat Minhas (Multan Sultans)

- Karachi Kings won the toss and elected to field.

Match 29
19 April 2026
19:00 (N)
Scorecard

Peshawar Zalmi; 255/3 (20 overs)	v	Quetta Gladiators; 137 (18.1 overs)
Babar Azam 100* (52); Abrar Ahmed 1/44 (4 overs)		Bevon Jacobs 34 (27); Ali Raza 3/9 (3.1 overs)

Peshawar Zalmi won by 118 runs
National Bank Stadium, Karachi
Umpires: Chris Brown (NZ) and Faisal Afridi (Pak)
Player of the match: Babar Azam (Peshawar Zalmi)

- Quetta Gladiators won the toss and elected to field.
- Peshawar Zalmi scored their highest total in Pakistan Super League, surpassing 246/3 which scored earlier in this season.

Match 30
21 April 2026
14:30
Scorecard

Lahore Qalandars; 197/6 (20 overs)	v	Quetta Gladiators; 188/7 (20 overs)
Fakhar Zaman 103 (51); Khalil Ahmed 2/38 (4 overs)		Rilee Rossouw 62 (29); Haris Rauf 2/28 (4 overs)

Lahore Qalandars won by 9 runs
Gaddafi Stadium, Lahore
Umpires: Ahsan Raza (Pak) and Allahudien Paleker (SA)
Player of the match: Fakhar Zaman (Lahore Qalandars)

- Lahore Qalandars won the toss and elected to bat.

Match 31
21 April 2026
19:00 (N)
Scorecard

Rawalpindiz; 166/4 (20 overs)	v	Multan Sultans; 167/4 (18.4 overs)
Daryl Mitchell 58 (46); Mohammad Imran 1/9 (3 overs)		Steve Smith 56 (31); Asif Afridi 2/28 (4 overs)

Multan Sultans won by 6 wickets
National Bank Stadium, Karachi
Umpires: Rashid Riaz (Pak) and Sharfuddoula (Ban)
Player of the match: Steve Smith (Multan Sultans)

- Rawalpindiz won the toss and elected to bat.

Match 32
22 April 2026
14:30
Scorecard

Karachi Kings; 182/9 (20 overs)	v	Peshawar Zalmi; 186/3 (18.5 overs)
Jason Roy 85 (51); Ali Raza 4/41 (4 overs)		Kusal Mendis 80* (43); Khushdil Shah 1/40 (4 overs)

Peshawar Zalmi won by 7 wickets
Gaddafi Stadium, Lahore
Umpires: Ahsan Raza (Pak) and Allahudien Paleker (SA)
Player of the match: Kusal Mendis (Peshawar Zalmi)

- Karachi Kings won the toss and elected to bat.
- Kusal Mendis (Peshawar Zalmi) scored his 6,000th run in T20s.
- Kusal Mendis (Peshawar Zalmi) surpassed Rilee Rossouw for the record of most runs by an overseas batsman in a single PSL edition, reaching a total of 493 runs.

Match 33
22 April 2026
19:00 (N)
Scorecard

Multan Sultans; 213/7 (20 overs)	v	Hyderabad Kingsmen; 214/6 (19.3 overs)
Steve Smith 106 (50); Akif Javed 3/30 (4 overs)		Usman Khan 101 (47); Peter Siddle 3/39 (4 overs)

Hyderabad Kingsmen won by 4 wickets
National Bank Stadium, Karachi
Umpires: Chris Gaffaney (NZ) and Zulfiqar Jan (Pak)
Player of the match: Usman Khan (Hyderabad Kingsmen)

- Hyderabad Kingsmen won the toss and elected to field.
- Steve Smith (Multan Sultans) scored his maiden century in Pakistan Super League.
- Usman Khan (Hyderabad Kingsmen) scored his fourth century in Pakistan Super League, the most by any batter.

Match 34
23 April 2026
14:30
Scorecard

Islamabad United; 137 (20 overs)	v	Rawalpindiz; 140/4 (18.1 overs)
Devon Conway 40 (33); Dian Forrester 2/9 (1 over)		Mohammad Rizwan 45 (38); Shadab Khan 1/18 (4 overs)

Rawalpindiz won by 6 wickets
National Bank Stadium, Karachi
Umpires: Alex Wharf (Eng) and Faisal Afridi (Pak)
Player of the match: Mohammad Rizwan (Rawalpindiz)

- Rawalpindiz won the toss and elected to field.
- Rawalpindiz recorded their first win in Pakistan Super League.

Match 35
23 April 2026
19:00 (N)
Scorecard

Lahore Qalandars; 199/6 (20 overs)	v	Karachi Kings; 203/5 (18.4 overs)
Abdullah Shafique 63 (36); Moeen Ali 2/26 (4 overs)		David Warner 63* (44); Ubaid Shah 3/41 (4 overs)

Karachi Kings won by 5 wickets
Gaddafi Stadium, Lahore
Umpires: Allahudien Paleker (SA) and Nasir Hussain (Pak)
Player of the match: Khushdil Shah (Karachi Kings)

- Karachi Kings won the toss and elected to field.

Match 36
24 April 2026
19:00 (N)
Scorecard

Hyderabad Kingsmen; 80 (15.5 overs)	v	Islamabad United; 83/2 (6.4 overs)
Usman Khan 25* (35); Richard Gleeson 3/9 (3 overs)		Mohsin Riaz 42 (18); Mohammad Ali 2/29 (3.4 overs)

Islamabad United won by 8 wickets
National Bank Stadium, Karachi
Umpires: Chris Gaffaney (NZ) and Rashid Riaz (Pak)
Player of the match: Richard Gleeson (Islamabad United)

- Islamabad United won the toss and elected to field.
- Islamabad United and Multan Sultan qualified for the play-offs as a result of this match.

Match 37
25 April 2026
14:30
Scorecard

Quetta Gladiators; 195/6 (20 overs)	v	Karachi Kings; 199/1 (18.3 overs)
Rilee Rossouw 90 (54); Abbas Afridi 2/22 (2.2 overs)		David Warner 89* (48); Jahandad Khan 1/38 (3.3 overs)

Karachi Kings won by 9 wickets
Gaddafi Stadium, Lahore
Umpires: Chris Brown (NZ) and Nasir Hussain (Pak)
Player of the match: David Warner (Karachi Kings)

- Karachi Kings won the toss and elected to field.
- Quetta Gladiators were eliminated as a result of this match.

Match 38
25 April 2026
19:00 (N)
Scorecard

Peshawar Zalmi; 199/4 (20 overs)	v	Lahore Qalandars; 200/4 (19.3 overs)
Michael Bracewell 83(45); Shaheen Afridi 2/36 (4 overs)		Fakhar Zaman 58* (47); Khurram Shahzad 1/22 (3 overs)

Lahore Qalandars won by 6 wickets
Gaddafi Stadium, Lahore
Umpires: Abdul Muqeet (Pak) and Allahudien Paleker (SA)
Player of the match: Fakhar Zaman (Lahore Qalandars)

- Lahore Qalandars won the toss and elected to field.
- Karachi Kings were eliminated as a result of this match.
- Lahore Qalandars broke Peshawar Zalmi's record of 8-match win streak in Pakistan Super League.

Match 39
26 April 2026
14:30
Scorecard

Hyderabad Kingsmen; 244/5 (20 overs)	v	Rawalpindiz; 136 (17.1 overs)
Glenn Maxwell 70 (37); Saad Masood 2/34 (4 overs)		Usman Khawaja 66* (43); Hunain Shah 4/22 (3.1 overs)

Hyderabad Kingsmen won by 108 runs
National Bank Stadium, Karachi
Umpires: Alex Wharf (Eng) and Zulfiqar Jan (Pak)
Player of the match: Glenn Maxwell (Hyderabad Kingsmen)

- Rawalpindiz won the toss and elected to field.
- Hyderabad Kingsmen qualified for the play-offs while Lahore Qalandars were eliminated as a result of this match.

Match 40
26 April 2026
19:00 (N)
Scorecard

Multan Sultans; 192/7 (20 overs)	v	Islamabad United; 193/6 (20 overs)
Shan Masood 44 (33); Faheem Ashraf 1/23 (3 overs)		Mark Chapman 69* (33); Faisal Akram 2/41 (4 overs)

Islamabad United won by 4 wickets
National Bank Stadium, Karachi
Umpires: Rashid Riaz (Pak) and Sharfuddoula (Ban)
Player of the match: Mark Chapman (Islamabad United)

- Islamabad United won the toss and elected to field.

== Playoffs ==
=== Bracket ===
Qualifier
28 April 2026
1	Peshawar Zalmi	221/7 (20 overs)
2	Islamabad United	151 (18.4 overs)
Eliminator 1
29 April 2026
3	Multan Sultans	159/9 (20 overs)
4	Hyderabad Kingsmen	162/2 (15.2 overs)

Eliminator 2
01 May 2026
QL	Islamabad United	184/7 (20 overs)
E1W	Hyderabad Kingsmen	186/5 (20 overs)

Final
03 May 2026
QW	Peshawar Zalmi	130/5 (15.2 overs)
E2W	Hyderabad Kingsmen	129 (18 overs)

=== Qualifier ===
Qualifier
28 April 2026
19:00 (N)
Scorecard

Peshawar Zalmi; 221/7 (20 overs)	v	Islamabad United; 151 (18.4 overs)
Babar Azam 103 (59); Shadab Khan 3/42 (4 overs)		Sameer Minhas 44 (23); Aaron Hardie 3/24 (4 overs)

Peshawar Zalmi won by 70 runs
National Bank Stadium, Karachi
Umpires: Alex Wharf (Eng) and Chris Gaffaney (NZ)
Player of the match: Babar Azam (Peshawar Zalmi)

- Islamabad United won the toss and elected to field.

=== Eliminator 1 ===
Eliminator 1
29 April 2026
19:00 (N)
Scorecard

Multan Sultans; 159/9 (20 overs)	v	Hyderabad Kingsmen; 162/2 (15.2 overs)
Shan Masood 69* (46); Akif Javed 2/30 (4 overs)		Maaz Sadaqat 64* (33); Steve Smith 1/14 (1 over)

Hyderabad Kingsmen won by 8 wickets
Gaddafi Stadium, Lahore
Umpires: Asif Yaqoob (Pak) and Sharfuddoula (Ban)
Player of the match: Maaz Sadaqat (Hyderabad Kingsmen)

- Hyderabad Kingsmen won the toss and elected to field.

=== Eliminator 2 ===
Eliminator 2
01 May 2026
19:00 (N)
Scorecard

Hyderabad Kingsmen; 186/5 (20 overs)	v	Islamabad United; 184/7 (20 overs)
Usman Khan 61* (30); Imad Wasim 2/16 (2 overs)		Mark Chapman 43 (26); Hunain Shah 2/37 (4 overs)

Hyderabad Kingsmen won by 2 runs
Gaddafi Stadium, Lahore
Umpires: Ahsan Raza (Pak) and Sharfuddoula (Ban)
Player of the match: Hunain Shah (Hyderabad Kingsmen)

- Islamabad United won the toss and elected to field.

=== Final ===
Final
3 May 2026
19:00 (N)
Scorecard

Hyderabad Kingsmen; 129 (18 overs)	v	Peshawar Zalmi; 130/5 (15.2 overs)
Saim Ayub 54 (50); Aaron Hardie 4/27 (4 overs)		Aaron Hardie 56* (39); Mohammad Ali 3/38 (4 overs)

Peshawar Zalmi won by 5 wickets
Gaddafi Stadium, Lahore
Umpires: Ahsan Raza (Pak) and Chris Gaffaney (NZ)
Player of the match: Aaron Hardie (Peshawar Zalmi)

- Peshawar Zalmi won the toss and elected to field.

== Awards and statistics ==
=== Most runs ===
Runs	Player	Team	Inns	HS	Ave
588	Babar Azam	Peshawar Zalmi	11	103	73.50
550	Kusal Mendis	Peshawar Zalmi	11	109	55.00
401	Fakhar Zaman	Lahore Qalandars	8	103	57.28
389	Usman Khan	Hyderabad Kingsmen	13	101	35.36
380	Sahibzada Farhan	Multan Sultans	10	106*	42.22
380	Steve Smith	Multan Sultans	11	106	34.54

- Source: ESPNcricinfo

=== Most wickets ===
Wkts	Player	Team	Inns	BBI	Ave
22	Sufiyan Muqeem	Peshawar Zalmi	11	4/32	14.40
20	Mohammad Ali	Hyderabad Kingsmen	12	3/21	18.95
17	Shadab Khan	Islamabad United	10	3/13	14.47
17	Hunain Shah	Hyderabad Kingsmen	10	4/22	18.41
16	Shaheen Afridi	Lahore Qalandars	10	4/18	18.18

- Source: ESPNcricinfo

=== End of season awards ===
Name	Team	Award
Sufiyan Muqeem	Peshawar Zalmi	Player of the Tournament
Babar Azam	Peshawar Zalmi	Batsman of the tournament
Sufiyan Muqeem	Peshawar Zalmi	Bowler of the tournament
Shadab Khan	Islamabad United	All-rounder of the tournament
Kusal Mendis	Peshawar Zalmi	Wicket-keeper of the tournament
Farhan Yousaf	Peshawar Zalmi	Fielder of the tournament
Hunain Shah	Hyderabad Kingsmen	Emerging player of the tournament
Asif Yaqoob	—N/a	Umpire of the tournament
—N/a	Hyderabad Kingsmen	Spirit of cricket

- Source: Geo Super

=== Team of the tournament ===
Name	Team	Role
Babar Azam	Peshawar Zalmi	Batter (Captain)
Fakhar Zaman	Lahore Qalandars	Batter
Kusal Mendis	Peshawar Zalmi	Wicket-keeper
Shan Masood	Multan Sultans	Batter
Usman Khan	Hyderabad Kingsmen	Batter
Shadab Khan	Islamabad United	All-rounder
Hassan Khan	Hyderabad Kingsmen	All-rounder
Shaheen Afridi	Lahore Qalandars	Bowler
Hunain Shah	Hyderabad Kingsmen	Bowler
Sufiyan Muqeem	Peshawar Zalmi	Bowler
Richard Gleeson	Islamabad United	Bowler
Hassan Nawaz	Quetta Gladiators	12th man

- Source: BBC Sport

== Controversies ==
=== Naseem Shah tweet ===
Maryam Nawaz, the Chief Minister of Punjab and niece of Prime Minister Shehbaz Sharif, attended the opening match along with several political figures, despite the PCB having restricted the general public at the stadiums. A controversy emerged with a tweet from the official X account of Rawalpindiz's fast bowler Naseem Shah, criticizing Nawaz's reception. Although the tweet was later deleted and Shah issued a clarification claiming his account had been compromised, the PCB issued him a show-cause notice, asserting that the incident breached the terms of his central contract and the board's media regulations regarding public criticism of officials. Shah was fined Rs. 2 crore and his social media manager was blacklisted from managing any player under a PCB contract.

=== Security protocol breach ===
Punjab Police wrote a formal letter to the PSL CEO, stating that on 28 March, Lahore Qalandars' captain Shaheen Shah Afridi and teammate Sikandar Raza breached a security protocol at the team hotel by bringing four visitors to a hotel room, despite the permission request by Qalandars team owner Sameen Rana being denied by PSL officials. Police requested a review of the incident and demanded necessary action to prevent future violations. Raza later stated he was unaware of the updated protocols, noting that meeting family members at the hotel had been allowed in previous seasons. Lahore Qalandars fined Afridi Rs. 10 lakh after an inquiry, and the PCB issued new, stricter regulations regarding team accommodation.

=== Ball tampering controversy ===
On 29 March, on-field umpires found that Lahore Qalandars had violated Law 41.3.2, which deals with ball tampering. As a result, they were penalized five runs, which were awarded to Karachi Kings during the match. The match referee conducted an investigation immediately after the match, where Lahore Qalandars player Fakhar Zaman denied the allegations of tampering. A second investigation held on 31 March 2026 resulted in Zaman receiving a two-match ban.

=== Inappropriate gesture ===
On 29 March, the PCB fined Hasan Ali of Karachi Kings 10% of his match fee for violating Law 2.5, which deals with inappropriate language or gestures against a dismissed batsman. He was found to have made such a gesture toward Haseebullah Khan of Lahore Qalandars.
