= Iftikhar Ahmed =

Iftikhar Ahmed or Iftikhar Ahmad may refer to:

- Iftikhar Ahmed (cricketer) (born 1990), Pakistani international cricketer
- Iftikhar Ahmed (Faisalabad cricketer) (born 1984), Pakistani cricketer
- Iftikhar Ahmed (Kalat cricketer), Pakistani cricketer who played for Kalat in the 1960s
- Iftikhar Ahmed (politician) (born 1954), Pakistani politician
- Iftikhar Ahmad (barrister) (born 1949), Pakistani barrister, political activist and military officer
- Iftikhar Ahmad (political activist) (born 1950), Pakistani political activist
- Iftikhar Ahmed, a fictional character in the 2012 Indian film Agent Vinod
