= Sufyan Moqim =

Pakistani cricketer (born 1999)

Personal information
- Born: 15 November 1999 (age 26); Baithak Awan Abad, Azad Kashmir, Pakistan
- Batting: Left-handed
- Bowling: Left-arm wrist spin
- Role: Bowler

International information
- National side: Pakistan (2023–present)
- ODI debut (cap 250): 22 December 2024 v South Africa
- Last ODI: 8 August 2025 v West Indies
- T20I debut (cap 109): 3 October 2023 v Hong Kong
- Last T20I: 14 September 2025 v India

Domestic team information
- Years: Team
- 2023–present: Peshawar Zalmi
- 2024–present: Dolphins
- 2026: Derbyshire

Career statistics
Competition	ODI	T20I	FC	LA
Matches	4	19	5	20
Runs scored	15	26	110	77
Batting average	15.00	5.20	20.00	11.00
100s/50s	0/0	0/0	0/0	0/0
Top score	13*	10	37	17*
Balls bowled	222	380	581	1,021
Wickets	8	27	13	39
Bowling average	22.75	14.74	23.07	20.35
5 wickets in innings	0	1	0	0
10 wickets in match	0	0	0	0
Best bowling	4/52	5/3	3/16	4/14
Catches/stumpings	0/–	4/–	1/–	3/–
Medal record
Men's cricket
Representing Pakistan
ACC Asia Cup
Runner-up	2025 UAE
Asian Games
Silver medal – second place	2026 Aichi–Nagoya	Team
- Source: Cricinfo, 13 July 2026

Sufyan Moqim (born 15 November 1999) is a Pakistani cricketer who plays as a left-arm wrist spin bowler for the Pakistan national team. He represents Dolphins in domestic cricket and Peshawar Zalmi in the Pakistan Super League.

== Early life ==
Sufyan Moqim hails from the town of Baithak Awan Abad in Sudhanoti District, Azad Kashmir where he played with tape ball but due do lack of facilities he later moved to Rawalpindi, playing club cricket and later first-class cricket. He has played for the Sabih Azhar Cricket Academy.

== International career ==
In July 2023, Moqim finished with figures of 3 for 66 in his ten overs in the final as Pakistan A defeated India A to win the ACC Emerging Teams Asia Cup.

On 3 October 2023, he made his Twenty20 International debut for Pakistan against Hong Kong taking two wickets at the Asian Games.

In January 2024, Moqim underwent an operation on his left knee.

In October 2024, he played as part of the Pakistan Shaheens at the ACC Emerging Teams Asia Cup who were defeated in the semi-final by Sri Lanka A.

In December 2024, during the away T20 International series against Zimbabwe, Moqim delivered a record-equalling bowling performance, taking 5 wickets while conceding just 3 runs in a match. This remarkable feat matched the world record for the fewest runs conceded for a men's T20I five-wicket haul. His spell was instrumental in his team's victory and showcased his potential in international cricket.

On 22 December 2024, he made his One Day International (ODI) debut with figures of 4/52 in the third ODI of the away tour against South Africa in Johannesburg.

On 2 April 2025, he scored an unbeaten 13 runs in 10 balls during the second ODI of the away tour against New Zealand at Hamilton and set the record for the highest score by a number 12 batter in international cricket.

In June 2026, he was named in the 15-member men's squad announced for the 2026 Asian Games. On 3 October 2026, Pakistan won the silver medal after losing in the Asian Games men’s cricket final against India at the Kōrogi Athletic Park in Nisshin, Japan.

== Franchise career ==
=== Pakistan Super League ===
In May 2026, Moqim was included in the PSL XI for his performances during the PSL 2026: playing for Peshawar Zalmi, he finished the tournament as the leading wicket-taker with 22 wickets at an average of 14.40 and an economy rate of 7.20, earning the Player of the Tournament award. He began his campaign with figures of 4/32 against the eventual runners-up, Kingsmen, in his second match, before taking three wickets in each of his next four matches. He concluded the tournament with strong performances in both the qualifier and the final, recording combined figures of 3/48 across eight overs.

=== Other leagues ===
In September 2026, Moqim was declared Player of the Match in the final of the 2026 Caribbean Premier League for his spell of 4/14 in 4 overs, helping his team Antigua & Barbuda Falcons lift the trophy for the first time.

== Playing style ==
Moqim is a left‑arm wrist spinner, a rare bowling style in modern cricket, making him the first of any note for Pakistan. His bowling style has been noted for its unusual release angle, being distinct from his contemporaries and fellow left-arm wrist spinners, Tabraiz Shamsi (South Africa), Kuldeep Yadav (India), and Noor Ahmad (Afghanistan): Shamsi and Yadav use more classical wrist-spin actions, with a languid delivery and release between 11 and 12 o'clock, imparting more air and spin. Ahmad, by contrast, releases from beyond 12 o'clock, creating an awkward angle but sometimes offering batters a clearer line of attack. Moqim's action lies between these extremes, the closest to 12 o'clock among the four. This near-vertical release gives his deliveries a steeper, downward trajectory, making lofted shots and sweeps harder to execute. Unlike traditional wrist-spinners, he does not rely on flight, aligning with modern T20 trends where flatter, harder-to-hit deliveries are prized.
