= Akif Javed =

Pakistani cricketer

Personal information
- Full name: Akif Javed
- Born: 10 October 2000 (age 26); Karak, Khyber Pakhtunkhwa, Pakistan
- Height: 6 ft 1 in (185 cm)
- Batting: Right-handed
- Bowling: Left arm medium-fast
- Role: Bowler

International information
- National side: Pakistan (2025–present)
- ODI debut (cap 251): 29 March 2025 v New Zealand
- Last ODI: 5 April 2025 v New Zealand

Domestic team information
- Years: Team
- 2019/20–2022/23: Balochistan
- 2020–2021: Islamabad United
- 2023: Karachi Kings
- 2024: Fortune Barishal
- 2025–present: Rangpur Riders
- 2025: Multan Sultans
- 2026: Hyderabad Kingsmen
- 2026: Derbyshire

Career statistics
Competition	ODI	FC	LA	T20
Matches	3	31	38	92
Runs scored	10	271	91	96
Batting average	5.00	10.42	9.10	8.72
100s/50s	0/0	0/1	0/0	0/0
Top score	8	53*	21	32
Balls bowled	168	4,221	1,624	1,932
Wickets	7	73	50	111
Bowling average	23.57	42.00	32.86	25.00
5 wickets in innings	0	0	1	0
10 wickets in match	0	0	0	0
Best bowling	4/62	4/55	5/60	4/28
Catches/stumpings	0/–	8/–	10/–	19/–
- Source: Cricinfo, 21 June 2026

Akif Javed (born 10 October 2000) is a Pakistani cricketer.

== Early life ==
Akif was born in Karak in Khyber Pakhtunkhwa, where due to the lack of sports infrastructure he had to play tennis-ball cricket in the streets. As his family wasn't well-off he had to help his late father run the shop. Later, in 2018, he would participate in the trials for Karachi Kings held in Dera Ismail Khan, ahead of the 2019 PSL, which would help him for his professional debut.

== Domestic career ==
In September 2019, he was named in Balochistan's squad for the 2019–20 Quaid-e-Azam Trophy tournament. He made his Twenty20 debut on 13 October 2019, for Balochistan in the 2019–20 National T20 Cup. He made his first-class debut for Balochistan in the 2019–20 Quaid-e-Azam Trophy on 28 October 2019.

In November 2019, he was named in Pakistan's squad for the 2019 ACC Emerging Teams Asia Cup in Bangladesh. He made his List A debut for Pakistan, against Afghanistan, in the Emerging Teams Cup on 14 November 2019. In October 2021, he was named in the Pakistan Shaheens squad for their tour of Sri Lanka.

Javed was signed by Derbyshire County Cricket Club for the 2026 T20 Blast.

== International career ==
In March 2025, Akif made his international cricket debut with 2025 Pakistan – New Zealand series. Since then, he has represented Pakistan in 3 ODI with 7 wickets to his name.
