= Fawad Ali =

Pakistani cricketer (born 1986)

Personal information
- Born: 12 November 1986 (age 40); Peshawar, Pakistan
- Source: Cricinfo, 14 November 2015

Fawad Ali (born 12 November 1986) is a Pakistani first-class cricketer who played for Peshawar cricket team.
