= Hassan Khan (cricketer) =

Pakistani cricketer

Personal information
- Full name: Mohammad Hassan Khan
- Born: 16 October 1998 (age 28); Karachi, Sindh, Pakistan
- Batting: Right-handed
- Bowling: Left arm orthodox
- Role: Bowler

Domestic team information
- Years: Team
- 2016: Sindh
- 2017/18: Karachi Whites
- 2017–2018; 2022: Quetta Gladiators (squad no. 16)
- 2019: Lahore Qalandars
- 2021: Mirpur Royals (squad no. 48)
- 2024: Antigua & Barbuda Falcons
- 2024–present: San Francisco Unicorns
- 2025: Guyana Amazon Warriors
- 2025/26–present: Melbourne Renegades (squad no. 98)
- 2026: Hyderabad Kingsmen (squad no. 16)
- Source: Cricinfo, 30 January 2022

Mohammad Hassan Khan (born 16 October 1998) is a Pakistani-born cricketer. He made his List A debut on 21 April 2016 for Sindh against Balochistan in the 2016 Pakistan Cup. Prior to his debut, he was named in Pakistan's squad for the 2016 Under-19 Cricket World Cup. He made his Twenty20 debut for Quetta Gladiators on 10 February 2017 in the 2017 Pakistan Super League. He made his first-class debut for Karachi Whites in the 2017–18 Quaid-e-Azam Trophy on 3 October 2017.

In December 2017, he was named as the captain of Pakistan's squad for the 2018 Under-19 Cricket World Cup.

In April 2018, he was named in Khyber Pakhtunkhwa's squad for the 2018 Pakistan Cup.

On 3 June 2018, he was selected to play for the Edmonton Royals in the players' draft for the inaugural edition of the Global T20 Canada tournament.

He debuted for Melbourne Renegades in the BBL 2025/26 tournament. In 2026 Pakistan Super League, he joined the new franchise Hyderabad Kingsmen.
