= Sameer Minhas =

Pakistani cricketer (born 2006)

Personal information
- Born: 2 October 2006 (age 20); Multan, Punjab, Pakistan
- Batting: Right-handed
- Bowling: Right-arm leg break
- Role: Batter
- Relatives: Arafat Minhas (brother)

Domestic team information
- Years: Team
- 2025-present: Pakistan Under-19
- 2026-present: Pakistan Shaheens
- 2026-present: Islamabad United
- Only Twenty20: 24 February 2026 Pakistan Shaheens v England Lions
- Only List A: 27 February 2026 Pakistan Shaheens v England Lions
- Source: ESPNcricinfo

Sameer Minhas (born 2 October 2006) is a Pakistani cricketer who plays for the Pakistan national under-19 cricket team.

A top-order batter from Multan, Punjab, he rose to prominence after a series of record-breaking performances in Youth One-Day Internationals, including a score of 172 against India in the final of the 2025 ACC Under-19 Asia Cup. He is the younger brother of Pakistani international cricketer Arafat Minhas.

== Early life and education ==
Sameer Minhas was born into a Punjabi Rajput family on 2 October 2006 in Multan, Punjab, Pakistan. He comes from a cricket-oriented background and developed an interest in the sport at a young age. His father, Kashif Minhas, had aspired to become a cricketer and played tape-ball cricket in Multan before encouraging his sons to pursue the sport professionally. Kashif later enrolled Sameer and his elder brother, Pakistani international cricketer Arafat Minhas, at the local Crescent Cricket Club, where they received formal coaching. Minhas grew up playing cricket alongside Arafat, who would later represent Pakistan internationally. The brothers often created improvised training environments at home, including practicing on wet tiled surfaces with taped tennis balls designed to simulate swing bowling. According to Minhas, these sessions were intended to replicate difficult batting conditions and helped develop his technique from a young age.

Outside cricket, Minhas has continued his education alongside his sporting career. He completed his O Levels, including Computer Science, before enrolling in A Levels. Because of the demands of professional cricket, he chose Business Studies, Urdu, and Sociology as his A-Level subjects. He has stated that continuing his education was particularly important to his mother, who encouraged him to pursue academic studies in parallel with cricket.

== Youth career ==
Minhas began his organized cricket career in 2018, representing Multan in the Pakistan Cricket Board's Under-13 competitions. Initially, he played primarily as a leg-spinner and emerged as Southern Punjab's leading wicket-taker in one Under-13 season, claiming nine wickets at an average of 10.56. Over time, however, he developed a stronger interest in batting and worked with coach Tahir Mahmood Faiz to remodel his game. Faiz focused on improving his timing, bat control, and ability to play the ball late, helping him transition from a bowling all-rounder into a specialist batter.He later represented Southern Punjab and Multan in age-group cricket, scoring 411 runs at an average of 59 in the PCB Under-19 competition, earning selection to the Pakistan Under-19 team.

During the 2025 ACC Under-19 Asia Cup, he emerged as the tournament's leading run-scorer, scoring 471 runs in five matches including two centuries and one half-century. In the final against India, he scored 172 runs off 113 balls, registering Pakistan's highest individual score in Youth One-Day Internationals. Over the tournament, he accumulated 471 runs at an average of 157 and a strike rate exceeding 117, earning the Player of the Tournament award.

In January 2026, he scored the fastest century in Youth One-Day International cricket, reaching the milestone in 42 balls against Zimbabwe in an Under-19 tri-series final.

== Domestic and franchise career ==
Following his emergence as one of Pakistan's leading youth batters, Minhas began transitioning into senior domestic cricket in 2026. He joined JDW Sugar Mills for the President's Trophy Grade-II tournament, marking his first appearance in a senior red-ball competition. Ahead of the 2026–27 domestic season, Minhas was selected by Pakistan Television (PTV), the reigning President's Trophy champions, with the expectation that he would make his first-class debut for the side. PTV head coach and former Pakistan Test opener Mohammad Wasim identified Minhas as a key part of the team's future plans and indicated that he would open the batting alongside Shamyl Hussain. Wasim cited Minhas's aggressive yet technically sound batting style as a major reason for his selection.

=== Pakistan Super League ===
In February 2026, Minhas entered the 2026 Pakistan Super League player auction as one of Pakistan's most highly rated uncapped players following his performances for the national Under-19 side. His selection triggered a bidding contest between Islamabad United and Quetta Gladiators, with Islamabad United eventually securing his services for PKR 19 million, more than three times his base price of PKR 6 million and the highest fee paid for an uncapped Under-23 player at the auction. In his debut PSL season, Minhas established himself as one of the tournament's breakout performers. He scored 343 runs in ten innings at an average of 42.87 and a strike rate of 155.90, including three half-centuries. He finished as Islamabad United's leading run-scorer ahead of Eliminator 2 and set a new record for the most runs scored by a teenager in a single PSL season.

== International career ==
On October 24, 2026, Minhas was named in the Test squad for the series against Sri Lanka.

== Playing style ==
Minhas is a right-handed top-order batter known for his orthodox technique, timing, and ability to build long innings. Unlike many modern youth batters, he has emphasized patience and shot selection over power-hitting, describing "fearless cricket" as maximizing scoring opportunities rather than attacking every delivery.
