= Hyderabad Kingsmen =

Hyderabad-based cricket franchise in the Pakistan Super League

- حيدرآباد کنگزمین
- League: Pakistan Super League

Personnel
- Captain: Marnus Labuschagne
- Coach: Jason Gillespie
- Batting coach: Hanif Malik
- Bowling coach: Saeed Ajmal
- Fielding coach: Grant Bradburn
- Owner: FKS Group

Team information
- City: Hyderabad, Sindh, Pakistan
- Founded: 8 January 2026; 10 months ago
- Home ground: Niaz Stadium
- Capacity: 15,000
- Official website: hhkingsmen.com
Home kit
Away kit

The Hyderabad Kingsmen (Urdu/Sindhi: حيدرآباد کنگزمین) are a professional Twenty20 franchise cricket team based in Hyderabad, Sindh, Pakistan, that competes in the Pakistan Super League (PSL). The franchise was established in 2026, when the league expanded from six to eight teams ahead of the 2026 Pakistan Super League. The franchise rights were sold to the FKS consortium for PKR 1.75 billion per year in an auction held by the Pakistan Cricket Board (PCB). The team's home ground is Niaz Stadium.

Hyderabad made their PSL debut in the 2026 season, which was the first edition of the league to feature eight teams. The team reached the final in their debut season, losing to Peshawar Zalmi by five wickets and finishing as runners-up.

== Franchise history ==
In December 2025, the PCB formally announced the expansion of the Pakistan Super League by adding two new franchises for the 2026 season. The board initiated a bidding process and carried out a technical evaluation, resulting in ten bidders qualifying for participation in the franchise auction. Six candidate cities were shortlisted for the new franchises: Hyderabad, Sialkot, Gilgit, Muzaffarabad, Faisalabad, and Rawalpindi.

The auction was held on 8 January 2026. Hyderabad and Sialkot were officially confirmed as the two new franchise cities.

FKS consortium secured the Hyderabad franchise with a successful bid of PKR 1.75 billion per year. Fawad Sarwar was the principal figure behind the FKS consortium who is also the owner of Kingsmen Sports and Enterprise and owns Chicago Kingsmen in USA Minor League. The team name and logo were revealed in a public ceremony held at Niaz Stadium on 7 February 2026. Initially the team was named Hyderabad Houston Kingsmen but management faced backlash from team's fan base for including American city 'Houston' in teams name. Team name was changed to Hyderabad Kingsmen removing Houston after public criticism.

== Performance in PSL ==
=== 2026 season ===
The 2026 Pakistan Super League was the debut season for Hyderabad Kingsmen, who entered the league as one of two expansion teams alongside Rawalpindiz. The team was coached by Jason Gillespie, while Australian batter Marnus Labuschagne captained the side.

Hyderabad lost their first four league matches, including their opening match against Lahore Qalandars at Gaddafi Stadium, Lahore. They recorded their first PSL win against Karachi Kings and later qualified for the playoffs after finishing fourth in the league stage with 10 points. In the playoffs, Hyderabad defeated Multan Sultans by eight wickets in Eliminator 1 before beating Islamabad United by two runs in Eliminator 2 to reach the final.

In the final, played on 3 May 2026 at Gaddafi Stadium, Lahore, Hyderabad lost to Peshawar Zalmi by five wickets and finished as runners-up in their debut season. Hyderabad were bowled out for 129 in 18 overs, with Saim Ayub scoring 54, before Peshawar reached 130/5 in 15.2 overs.

== Team identity ==
The franchise is owned by FKS, which also owns the Chicago Kingsmen, a team competing in Minor League Cricket in the United States.

Team name and logo were revealed in a public ceremony held at Niaz Stadium, Hyderabad on 7 February 2026. Team owner Fawad Sarwar revealed the franchise name as Hyderabad Houston Kingsmen, which was later renamed as 'Hyderabad Kingsmen' removing Houston from the name after public criticism.

Year	Kit manufacturer	Shirt sponsor (front)	Shirt sponsor (back)	Chest branding	Sleeve branding
2026	New Balance	Wisden	—N/a		LAAM, Lake City Lahore

== Current squad ==
Key
- Players with international caps are listed in **bold**.
- * denotes a player who is fully unavailable.
- * denotes a player who will be partially unavailable.

No.	Name	National team	Birth date	Salary	Batting style	Bowling style	Year signed	Notes
Batsmen
33	**Marnus Labuschagne**	Australia	22 June 1994 (age 32)	PKR 5.88 crore	Right-handed	Right-arm leg break	2026	Captain
75	**Irfan Khan Niazi**	Pakistan	28 December 2002 (age 23)	PKR 2.90 crore	Right-handed	Right-arm medium	2026	
11	**Shayan Jahangir**	United States	24 December 1994 (age 31)	PKR 60 lakh	Right-handed	Right-arm medium	2026	
98	**Sharjeel Khan**	Pakistan	14 August 1989 (age 37)	PKR 60 lakh	Left-handed	Slow left arm orthodox	2026	
26	**Saad Ali**	United States	5 October 1993 (age 33)	PKR 60 lakh	Right-handed	Right-arm medium	2026	
1	Tayyab Arif	Pakistan	11 October 2006 (age 20)	PKR 60 lakh	Right-handed	—	2026	
Wicket-keepers
153	**Kusal Perera**	Sri Lanka	17 August 1990 (age 36)	PKR 3.10 crore	Left-handed	—	2026	
78	**Usman Khan**	Pakistan	10 May 1995 (age 31)	PKR 4.62 crore	Right-handed	—	2026	
All-rounders
63	**Saim Ayub**	Pakistan	24 May 2002 (age 24)	PKR 12.60 crore	Left-handed	Right-arm off break	2026	
32	**Glenn Maxwell**	Australia	14 October 1988 (age 38)	PKR 2.34 crore	Right-handed	Right-arm off break	2026	
15	**Maaz Sadaqat**	Pakistan	15 May 2005 (age 21)	PKR 3.50 crore	Left-handed	Slow left arm orthodox	2026	
16	Hassan Khan	United States	16 October 1998 (age 28)	PKR 1.85 crore	Right-handed	Slow left arm orthodox	2026	Vice Captain
73	**Hammad Azam**	United States	16 March 1991 (age 35)	PKR 60 lakh	Right-handed	Right-arm fast-medium	2026	
107	Rizwan Mehmood	Pakistan	15 June 2004 (age 22)	PKR 60 lakh	Right-handed	Right-arm leg break	2026	
55	Ahmed Hussain	Pakistan	15 May 2007 (age 19)	PKR 60 lakh	Left-handed	Left-arm leg break	2026	
Bowlers
88	**Akif Javed**	Pakistan	10 October 2000 (age 26)	PKR 1.96 crore	Right-handed	Left-arm fast	2026	
11	**Mohammad Ali**	Pakistan	1 November 1992 (age 34)	PKR 2.15 crore	Right-handed	Right-arm medium-fast	2026	
34	**Riley Meredith**	Australia	21 June 1996 (age 30)	PKR 4.20 crore	Right-handed	Right-arm fast	2026	
72	Hunain Shah	Pakistan	4 February 2004 (age 22)	PKR 60 lakh	Right-handed	Right-arm medium	2026	
84	Asif Mehmood	Pakistan	3 February 1996 (age 30)	PKR 60 lakh	Right-handed	Right-arm medium	2026	
61	**Maheesh Theekshana**	Sri Lanka	1 August 2000 (age 26)	PKR 60 lakh	Right-handed	Right-arm off break	2026	

Source: ESPNcricinfo

== Management and coaching staff ==
Position	Name
Head coach	(Australia) Jason Gillespie
Assistant coach	(England) Craig White
Batting coach	(Pakistan) Hanif Malik
Fielding coach	(New Zealand) Grant Bradburn
Analyst	(England) Freddie Wilde
Strength & Conditioning Coach	(United States) Zak Martin
Commercial Head	(United States) Laura Russo
Franchise Director & General Manager	(United States) Salman Abbasi
Operations Director & General Manager	(United States) Iqra Farooqui
Group Director & General Manager	(United States) Faisal Mirza
Head of Operations	(United States) Talha Alvi

== Captains ==
Name	From	To	Mat	Won	Lost	Tie&W	Tie&L	NR	Win%
Marnus Labuschagne	2026	Present	13	7	6	0	0	-0.361	53.8
