= Rawalpindiz =

Rawalpindi-based cricket franchise in the Pakistan Super League

- راولپنڈیز
- Nickname: Pindiz
- League: Pakistan Super League

Personnel
- Captain: Mohammad Rizwan
- Coach: Adam Voges
- Bowling coach: Courtney Walsh
- Owner: Walee Technologies

Team information
- City: Rawalpindi, Punjab, Pakistan
- Founded: 9 February 2026; 9 months ago
- Home ground: Rawalpindi Cricket Stadium
- Capacity: 15,000
Home kit
Away kit

The Rawalpindiz (Urdu/Punjabi: راولپنڈیز), also known as Pindiz, are a professional Twenty20 franchise cricket team based in Rawalpindi, Punjab, that competes in the Pakistan Super League (PSL). The franchise was established in 2026 following the expansion of the league from six to eight teams for the 2026 Pakistan Super League. The franchise rights were sold to Walee Technologies consortium for Rs 2.45 billion, making it the most expensive team in PSL history as they acquired Multan Sultans to rebrand it as Rawalpindiz. Team's home ground is the Rawalpindi Cricket Stadium.

== Franchise history ==
On 9 February 2026, the Pakistan Cricket Board (PCB) announced the successful auction of the Multan Sultans franchise, which was acquired by Walee Technologies for PKR 245 crore at an auction held at the Expo Centre, Lahore. The sale followed a competitive bidding process involving five technically qualified bidders and exceeded the base price set by the PCB, making it the highest bid for a franchise among the Pakistan Super League teams.

Following the acquisition, the new owners confirmed that the franchise would be relocated from Multan to Rawalpindi and rebranded under a new identity. The change was undertaken as part of the Pakistan Super League's expansion ahead of its 11th season, which increased the number of participating teams from six to eight.

On 22 February 2026, the franchise officially unveiled its team name as "Pindiz" through a promotional video released on social media platforms. The announcement marked the completion of the franchise's rebranding process following its relocation to Rawalpindi ahead of the 2026 Pakistan Super League. The name was revealed via a teaser video featuring landmarks of the city, with the franchise also indicating that its official logo would be announced subsequently.

Initially team name was announced as Pindiz and it was used by team management for branding but later Pakistan Cricket Board forced the franchise to include the city name it was representing, Rawalpindiz was later adopted as the new name for the team.

== PSL history ==
=== 2026 season ===
The franchise will officially begin their participation in the PSL from the 2026 season, with Rawalpindi Cricket Stadium designated as its home venue.

== Team identity ==
As of the franchise's inaugural season, the team name, logo, coaching staff, and playing squad were announced after the player auction. Further details were expected to be released by the franchise management prior to the start of the 2026 PSL season.

Year	Kit manufacturer	Shirt sponsor (front)	Shirt sponsor (back)	Chest branding	Sleeve branding
2026	Fly Jinnah	JazzCash	Tech Destination Pakistan	Foodpanda	Hakeem Easy Finance, Bata Corporation

== Current squad ==
Key
- Players with international caps are listed in **bold**.
- * denotes a player who is fully unavailable
- * denotes a player who will be partially unavailable

No.	Name	Nationality	Birth date	Salary	Batting style	Bowling style	Year signed	Notes
Batsmen
19	Yasir Khan	Pakistan	13 April 2002 (age 24)	PKR 60 lakh	Right-handed	Right-arm medium	2026	
15	Abdullah Fazal	Pakistan	16 January 2003 (age 23)	PKR 67.50 lakh	Left-handed	—	2026	
27	Shahzaib Khan	Pakistan	5 October 2005 (age 21)	PKR 60 lakh	Right-handed	Right-arm off break	2026	
1	**Usman Khawaja**	Australia	18 December 1986 (age 39)	PKR 1.10 crore	Left-handed	Right-arm off break	2026	
Wicket-keepers
16	**Mohammad Rizwan**	Pakistan	1 June 1992 (age 34)	PKR 5.60 crore	Right-handed	—	2026	Captain
7	**Sam Billings**	England	15 June 1991 (age 35)	PKR 3.08 crore	Right-handed	—	2026	
All-rounders
75	**Daryl Mitchell**	New Zealand	20 May 1991 (age 35)	PKR 8.05 crore	Right-handed	Right-arm medium-fast	2026	
33	**Asif Afridi**	Pakistan	25 December 1986 (age 39)	PKR 2.40 crore	Left-handed	Slow left-arm orthodox	2026	
37	Amad Butt	Pakistan	10 May 1995 (age 31)	PKR 80 lakh	Right-handed	Right arm medium-fast	2026	
82	**Kamran Ghulam**	Pakistan	10 October 1995 (age 31)	PKR 65 lakh	Right-handed	Slow left-arm orthodox	2026	
14	**Dian Forrester**	South Africa	7 June 2000 (age 26)	PKR 65 lakh	Left-handed	Right-handed fasr	2026	
45	Saad Masood	Pakistan	12 July 2004 (age 22)	PKR 84 lakh	Right-handed	Right-arm leg spin	2026	
88	**Cole McConchie**	New Zealand	12 January 1992 (age 34)	PKR 60 lakh	Right-handed	Right-arm off spin	2026	
66	Mubasir Khan	Pakistan	24 April 2002 (age 24)	PKR 60 lakh	Right-handed	Right-arm off break	2026	
Bowlers
71	**Naseem Shah**	Pakistan	15 February 2003 (age 23)	PKR 8.65 crore	Right-handed	Right-arm fast	2026	
5	**Mohammad Amir**	Pakistan	13 April 1992 (age 34)	PKR 5.40 crore	Left-handed	Left-arm fast	2026	
22	**Rishad Hossain**	Bangladesh	15 July 2002 (age 24)	PKR 3.0 crore	Right-handed	Right-arm leg break	2026	
6	Fawad Ali	Pakistan	6 June 2004 (age 22)	PKR 60 lakh	Right-handed	Right-arm medium-fast	2026	
9	Mohammad Amir Khan	Pakistan	9 September 2001 (age 25)	PKR 60 lakh	Right-handed	Right-arm medium-fast	2026	
11	Jalat Khan	Pakistan	17 February 1999 (age 27)	PKR 60 lakh	Left-handed	Left-arm fast	2026	
28	Ben Sears	New Zealand	11 February 1998 (age 28)	PKR 2.50 crore	Right-handed	Right-arm medium-fast	2026	
17	Razaullah	Pakistan	5 April 2005 (age 21)	PKR 60 lakh	Right-handed	Right-arm medium-fast	2026	
Source: ESPNcricinfo

== Management and coaching staff ==
Position	Name
President & mentor	(Pakistan) Inzamam-ul-Haq
Head coach	(Australia) Adam Voges
Head of competitive strategy & assistant coach	(Pakistan) Abdur Rehman
Batting coach	(Pakistan) Shahid Aslam
Bowling coach	(Cricket West Indies) Courtney Walsh
Fielding coach	(Pakistan) Rafatullah Mohmand
Team manager	(Pakistan) Hassan Cheema
General manager	(Pakistan) Harris Jalil Mir

== Captains ==
Name	From	To	Mat	Won	Lost	Tie&W	Tie&L	NR	Win%
Mohammad Rizwan	2026	Present	10	1	9	–	–	–	10%
