= 2024–25 Champions One-Day Cup =

Cricket tournament

- Dates: 12 – 29 September 2024
- Administrator: Pakistan Cricket Board
- Cricket format: List A
- Tournament format(s): Round-robin and play-off
- Host: Pakistan
- Champions: Panthers (1st title)
- Participants: 5
- Matches: 14
- Player of the series: Mohammad Hasnain (Panthers)
- Most runs: Usman Khan (Panthers) (272)
- Most wickets: Mohammad Hasnain (Panthers) (17)
- Official website: championscup.pk

The 2024–25 Champions One-Day Cup (also known as Bahria Town Champions One-Day Cup 2024–25 for sponsorship reasons) was the inaugural edition of the Champions One-Day Cup, a List A cricket competition in Pakistan. The tournament began on 12 September 2024 and the final was held on 29 September 2024. Five teams took part in the tournament. In August 2024, Pakistan Cricket Board (PCB) confirmed the fixtures for the competition.

== Background ==
=== Commentary Panel ===
List of Commentators
Pakistan
- Ali Younis
- Marina Iqbal
- Salman Butt
- Shah Faisal
- Sikandar Bakht
- Hijab Zahid

=== Presenter ===
- Meesha Imran

== Team and squads ==
Team	Captain	Mentor
Dolphins	Saud Shakeel	Sarfaraz Ahmed
Lions	Shaheen Afridi	Waqar Younis
Markhors	Mohammad Rizwan	Misbah ul Haq
Panthers	Shadab Khan	Saqlain Mushtaq
Stallions	Mohammad Haris	Shoaib Malik

On 6 September 2024, the Pakistan Cricket Board announced the provisional squads of the five teams with rosters of 30 players each.

=== Squads ===
Dolphins	Lions	Markhors	Panthers	Stallions
Saud Shakeel (c); Abbas Afridi; Muhammad Akhlaq (wk); Qasim Akram; Asif Ali; Noman Ali; Umar Amin; Faheem Ashraf; Sahibzada Farhan; Sameen Gul; Mir Hamza; Muhammad Hurraira; Sufiyan Muqeem; Usman Qadir; Muhammad Riazullah	Shaheen Afridi (c); Faisal Akram; Sajjad Ali; Mohammad Asghar; Ahmed Daniyal; Imam-ul-Haq; Aamir Jamal; Irfan Khan; Rohail Nazir (wk); Abdullah Shafique; Khushdil Shah; Sirajuddin; Sharoon Siraj; Mohammad Taha; Aamer Yamin; Omair Yousuf	Mohammad Rizwan (c, wk); Salman Ali Agha; Iftikhar Ahmed; Shahnawaz Dahani; Mohammad Faizan; Kamran Ghulam; Mohammad Imran; Akif Javed; Bismillah Khan (wk); Haseebullah Khan (wk); Zahid Mahmood; Mohammad Nawaz; Mohammad Imran Randhawa; Abdul Samad; Mohammad Sarwar; Naseem Shah; Ali Usman; Fakhar Zaman; Imran Mani	Shadab Khan (c) (Note: Saim Ayub captained Panthers in their last match of the group stage.); Haider Ali; Azan Awais; Saim Ayub; Abdul Bangalzai; Ahmed Bashir; Amad Butt; Mohammad Hasnain; Mubasir Khan; Usman Khan; Rizwan Mehmood; Arafat Minhas; Usama Mir; Umar Siddiq; Mohammad Umar; Mohammad Zeeshan	Mohammad Haris (c); Abrar Ahmed; Junaid Ali; Mohammad Ali; Adil Amin; Babar Azam; Shamyl Hussain; Azam Khan; Jahandad Khan; Mohammad Amir Khan; Saad Khan; Yasir Khan; Zaman Khan; Shan Masood; Mehran Mumtaz; Haris Rauf; Ubaid Shah; Tayyab Tahir; Hussain Talat; Wasim Wasi

== Opening ceremony ==
The opening ceremony took place on Iqbal Stadium in Faisalabad during the evening of 12 September 2024, a day before the start of the Champions One-Day Cup. Aima Baig hosted the event.

== Match officials ==
On 12 September 2024, the PCB announced the list of officials for league stage matches which included 4 members of Elite Panel of ICC Umpires.

=== Umpires ===
- Aleem Dar
- Asif Yaqoob
- Waleed Yaqub
- Zulfiqar Jan
- Faisal Afridi
- Imtiaz Iqbal
- Imran Jawed
- Nasir Hussain
- Rashid Riaz

=== Referees ===
- Bilal Khilji
- Iftikhar Ahmed
- Iqbal Sheikh
- Nadeem Arshad
- Kamran Chaudhry
- Imran Mani
- Wasim Wasi

== Points table ==
Pos	Team	Pld	W	L	T	NR	BP	Pts	NRR	Qualification
1	Markhors	4	3	1	0	0	8	38	1.715	Advanced to Qualifier 1
2	Panthers	4	3	1	0	0	4	34	−0.030	Advanced to Qualifier 1
3	Stallions	4	2	2	0	0	8	28	0.805	Advanced to Eliminator
4	Lions	4	1	3	0	0	2	12	−0.990	Advanced to Eliminator
5	Dolphins	4	1	3	0	0	1	11	−1.500	

Source: ESPNcricinfo

=== Points system ===
- Match outright win: 10 points

Bonus points:

- Winning by 8/9/10 wickets: 1, 2, 3 points respectively
- Winning by 50/75/100 runs: 1, 2, 3 points respectively
- Score 350-374 runs: 1 bonus point
- Score 375+ runs: 2 bonus points
- Take 8 wickets: 1 bonus point
- Dismiss the entire team (10 wickets): 2 bonus points
- Bowling team takes 3 wickets in powerplay: 1 bonus point
- Batting team scores 100+ runs in powerplay: 2 bonus points

== League stage ==
On 28 August 2024, Pakistan Cricket Board confirmed the full schedule for the tournament.

12 September 2024
15:00 (D/N)
Scorecard

Markhors; 347/6 (50 overs)	v	Panthers; 187 (34.5 overs)
Kamran Ghulam 115 (102); Mubasir Khan 2/36 (9 overs)		Amad Butt 72 (84); Akif Javed 3/43 (8 overs)

Markhors won by 160 runs
Iqbal Stadium, Faisalabad
Umpires: Aleem Dar and Asif Yaqoob
Player of the match: Kamran Ghulam (Markhors)

- Panthers won the toss and elected to field.
- Azan Awais (Panthers) made his List A debut.
- Points: Markhors 14, Panthers 0.

13 September 2024
15:00 (D/N)
Scorecard

Stallions; 336/5 (50 overs)	v	Lions; 203 (39.3 overs)
Babar Azam 76 (79); Aamir Jamal 2/60 (8 overs)		Imam-ul-Haq 78 (83); Haris Rauf 3/43 (7.3 overs)

Stallions won by 133 runs
Iqbal Stadium, Faisalabad
Umpires: Aleem Dar and Waleed Yaqub
Player of the match: Babar Azam (Stallions)

- Stallions won the toss and elected to bat.
- Sajjad Ali (Lions) and Yasir Khan (Stallions) both made their List A debuts.
- Points: Stallions 13, Lions 0.

14 September 2024
15:00 (D/N)
Scorecard

Panthers; 328 (49.4 overs)	v	Dolphins; 278 (47 overs)
Usman Khan 111 (110); Usman Qadir 3/63 (7.4 overs)		Sahibzada Farhan 52 (69); Mohammad Hasnain 5/74 (10 overs)

Panthers won by 50 runs
Iqbal Stadium, Faisalabad
Umpires: Zulfiqar Jan and Asif Yaqoob
Player of the match: Mohammad Hasnain (Panthers)

- Panthers won the toss and elected to bat.
- Usman Khan (Panthers) scored his first century in List A cricket.
- Points: Panthers 11, Dolphins 0.

15 September 2024
15:00 (D/N)
Scorecard

Markhors; 231 (45 overs)	v	Stallions; 105 (23.4 overs)
Iftikhar Ahmed 60 (66); Jahandad Khan 4/49 (10 overs)		Babar Azam 45 (44); Zahid Mahmood 5/18 (4.4 overs)

Markhors won by 126 runs
Iqbal Stadium, Faisalabad
Umpires: Aleem Dar and Rashid Riaz
Player of the match: Zahid Mahmood (Markhors)

- Markhors won the toss and elected to bat.
- Zahid Mahmood (Stallions) took his first five-wicket haul in List A cricket.
- Points: Markhors 13, Stallions 1.

16 September 2024
09:30
Scorecard

Panthers; 283 (46.5 overs)	v	Lions; 199 (35.2 overs)
Mubasir Khan 90 (97); Ahmed Daniyal 3/47 (9 overs)		Imam-ul-Haq 60 (62); Shadab Khan 3/42 (8 overs)

Panthers won by 84 runs
Iqbal Stadium, Faisalabad
Umpires: Zulfiqar Jan and Waleed Yaqub
Player of the match: Shadab Khan (Panthers)

- Panthers won the toss and elected to bat.
- Points: Panthers 12, Lions 1

18 September 2024
09:30
Scorecard

Markhors; 248/9 (50 overs)	v	Dolphins; 192 (43.5 overs)
Kamran Ghulam 113 (110); Faheem Ashraf 4/50 (8 overs)		Asif Ali 50 (43); Salman Ali Agha 3/34 (10 overs)

Markhors won by 92 runs
Iqbal Stadium, Faisalabad
Umpires: Nasir Hussain and Rashid Riaz
Player of the match: Kamran Ghulam (Markhors)

- Dolphins won the toss and elected to field.
- Points: Markhors 11, Dolphins 0

19 September 2024
15:00 (D/N)
Scorecard

Stallions; 271/7 (50 overs)	v	Dolphins; 97 (25 overs)
Babar Azam 104* (100); Saud Shakeel 1/14 (3 overs)		Sahibzada Farhan 32 (36); Mehran Mumtaz 3/14 (4 overs)

Stallions won by 174 runs
Iqbal Stadium, Faisalabad
Umpires: Imtiaz Iqbal and Imran Jawed
Player of the match: Babar Azam (Stallions)

- Stallions won the toss and elected to bat.
- Points: Stallions 14, Dolphins 0

20 September 2024
15:00 (D/N)
Scorecard

Lions; 367/6 (50 overs)	v	Markhors; 332/9 (50 overs)
Irfan Khan 100* (56); Zahid Mahmood 2/49 (8 overs)		Fakhar Zaman 82 (72); Aamer Yamin 2/54 (9 overs)

Lions won by 35 runs
Iqbal Stadium, Faisalabad
Umpires: Imran Jawed and Nasir Hussain
Player of the match: Irfan Khan (Lions)

- Lions won the toss and elected to bat.
- Irfan Khan (Lions) scored his first century in List A cricket.
- Points: Lions 11, Markhors 1

21 September 2024
15:00 (D/N)
Scorecard

Panthers; 344/7 (50 overs)	v	Stallions; 324 (49.3 overs)
Saim Ayub 156 (130); Zaman Khan 4/90 (10 overs)		Tayyab Tahir 109 (120); Mubasir Khan 3/77 (9 overs)

Panthers won by 20 runs
Iqbal Stadium, Faisalabad
Umpires: Imran Jawed and Nasir Hussain
Player of the match: Saim Ayub (Panthers)

- Panthers won the toss and elected to bat.
- Rizwan Mehmood (Panthers) made his List A debut.
- Points: Panthers 11, Stallions 0

22 September 2024
15:00 (D/N)
Scorecard

Dolphins; 326 (49.3 overs)	v	Lions; 310/8 (50 overs)
Umar Amin 75 (81); Aamer Jamal 3/69 (9.3 overs)		Rohail Nazir 62 (70); Saud Shakeel 2/24 (4 overs)

Dolphins won by 16 runs
Iqbal Stadium, Faisalabad
Umpires: Faisal Afridi and Imtiaz Iqbal
Player of the match: Umar Amin (Dolphins)

- Dolphins won the toss and elected to bat.
- Points: Dolphins 11, Lions 0

== Playoffs ==
Qualifier 1
24 September 2024 - Faisalabad
1	Markhors	137 (36 overs)
2	Panthers	143/3 (23.4 overs)
Eliminator
25 September 2024 - Faisalabad
3	Stallions	251 (49.4 overs)
4	Lions	263/9 (50 overs)

Qualifier 2
27 September 2024 - Faisalabad
Q1L	Markhors
EW	Lions

Final
29 September 2024 - Faisalabad
Q1W	Panthers	123/5 (18 overs)
Q2W	Markhors	122 (33.4 overs)

=== Qualifier 1 ===
24 September 2024
15:00 (D/N)
Scorecard

Markhors; 137 (36 overs)	v	Panthers; 143/3 (23.4 overs)
Salman Ali Agha 52 (81); Saim Ayub 5/24 (6 overs)		Usman Khan 54* (26); Akif Javed 1/20 (5 overs)

Panthers won by 7 wickets
Iqbal Stadium, Faisalabad
Umpires: Aleem Dar and Rashid Riaz
Player of the match: Saim Ayub (Panthers)

- Markhors won the toss and elected to bat.
- Saim Ayub (Panthers) took his first five-wicket haul in List A cricket.

=== Eliminator ===
25 September 2024
15:00 (D/N)
Scorecard

Lions; 263/9 (50 overs)	v	Stallions; 251 (49.4 overs)
Ahmed Daniyal 65* (59); Ubaid Shah 3/46 (10 overs)		Yasir Khan 39 (41); Khushdil Shah 3/40 (10 overs)

Lions won by 12 runs
Iqbal Stadium, Faisalabad
Umpires: Faisal Afridi and Asif Yaqoob
Player of the match: Ahmed Daniyal (Lions)

- Lions won the toss and elected to bat.

=== Qualifier 2 ===
27 September 2024
15:00 (D/N)
Scorecard

Lions	v	Markhors

Match abandoned
Iqbal Stadium, Faisalabad
Umpires: Aleem Dar and Rashid Riaz

- No toss
- No play was possible due to rain and wet outfield.
- Markhors qualified to the finals due to higher position in the points table.

=== Final ===
29 September 2024
15:00 (D/N)
Scorecard

Markhors; 122 (33.4 overs)	v	Panthers; 123/5 (18 overs)
Fakhar Zaman 46 (49); Arafat Minhas 3/1 (2.4 overs)		Abdul Bangalzai 41 (43); Mohammad Imran 2/11 (2 overs)

Panthers won by 5 wickets
Iqbal Stadium, Faisalabad
Umpires: Aleem Dar and Rashid Riaz
Player of the match: Sajid Khan (Panthers)

- Markhors won the toss and elected to bat.
