= List of Pakistani cricket teams =

This is a list of cricket teams that have played in top-level domestic competitions (First-Class, List A and T20) in Pakistan.

== Regional and departmental domestic teams (men) ==
As of August 2023, the PCB announced the return of regional associations and departmental cricket structure.

=== Regional teams ===
- Abbottabad
- Azad Jammu and Kashmir
- Bahawalpur (Note: Bahawalpur was absorbed into Multan for first-class cricket in 2003–04, and returned to first-class cricket in 2012–13.)
- Dera Murad Jamali
- Faisalabad
- Federally Administered Tribal Areas (FATA)
- Hyderabad
- Islamabad (Note: Islamabad was absorbed into Rawalpindi for first-class cricket in 2003–04.)
- Karachi Blues
- Karachi Whites
- Lahore Blues
- Lahore Whites
- Larkana
- Multan
- Peshawar
- Quetta
- Rawalpindi
- Sialkot

=== Departmental teams ===
As for the 2025-26 season, PCB introduced a three-tier departmental cricket structure (Grade-I, Grade-II, and Grade-III).The season runs from August 2025 to May 2026 and includes one first-class, one List-A, and one two-day competition, with the top two teams from Grade-III qualifying for Grade-II the following season.

The participating teams for 2025-26 season President's Trophy are listed below:

- Ghani Glass cricket team
- Khan Research Laboratories cricket team
- Oil and Gas Development Company Limited cricket team
- Pakistan Television cricket team
- Sahir Associates
- State Bank of Pakistan cricket team
- Sui Northern Gas Pipelines Limited cricket team
- Water and Power Development Authority (WAPDA) cricket team

The teams that have qualified for the 2025-26 President's Trophy Grade-II based on their previous standings in the 2024-25 President’s Trophy Grade-II tournament with two relegated teams from the Grade-I competition are listed below:

- Ahmed Glass cricket team
- Eshaal Associates cricket team (relegated)
- Ghani Institute cricket team
- Higher Education Commission cricket team (relegated)
- JDW Sugar Mills cricket team
- Kingsmen cricket team
- MIT Solutions cricket team
- Pakistan Air Force cricket team
- Parks and Horticulture Authority (PHA) Rawalpindi cricket team
- Port Qasim Authority cricket team
- Pakistan Railways cricket team
- Sardar Group cricket team
- Vital Tea cricket team
- Wing 999 Sports cricket team

=== Pentangular tournaments ===
In August 2024, Pakistan Cricket Board (PCB) also introduced three new competitions namely The Champions One-Day Cup, Champions T20 Cup and Champions First-Class Cup as a part of the 2024-25 domestic season. The teams competing in these tournaments are listed below:

- Dolphins cricket team
- Lions cricket team
- Panthers cricket team
- Stallions cricket team
- Markhors cricket team

== Franchise teams (men) ==
=== Pakistan Super League ===
The Pakistan Super League (PSL) is a Franchise T20 tournament and is competed between eight city-based franchise teams:

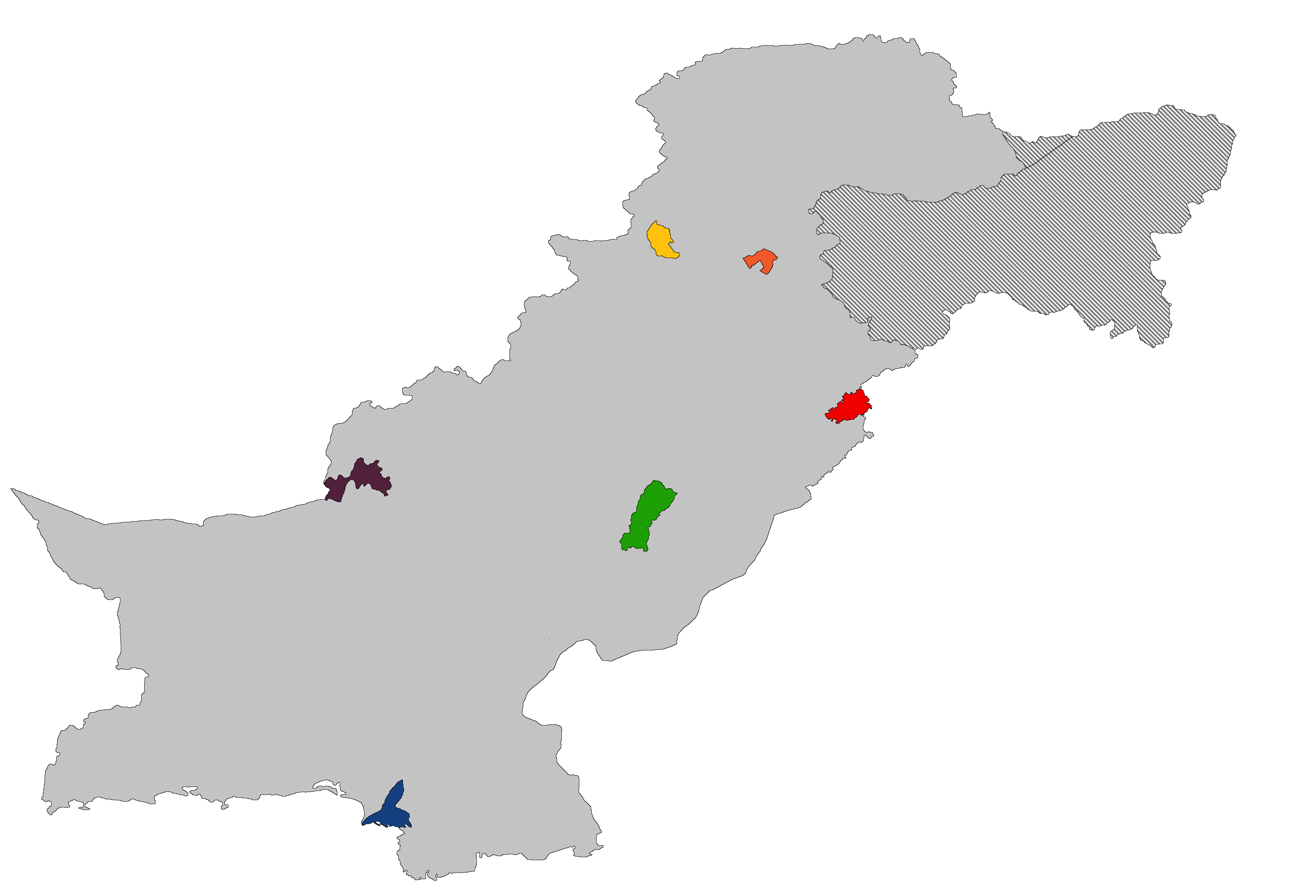
Islamabad United; Karachi Kings; Lahore Qalandars; Peshawar Zalmi; Multan Sultans; Quetta Gladiators

- Karachi Kings
- Islamabad United
- Multan Sultans
- Peshawar Zalmi
- Lahore Qalandars
- Quetta Gladiators
- Rawalpindiz
- Hyderabad Kingsmen

== Domestic teams (women) ==
- PCB Blasters
- PCB Challengers
- PCB Dynamites
- PCB Strikers

== Former and defunct teams ==
=== Provinces and federal territories ===
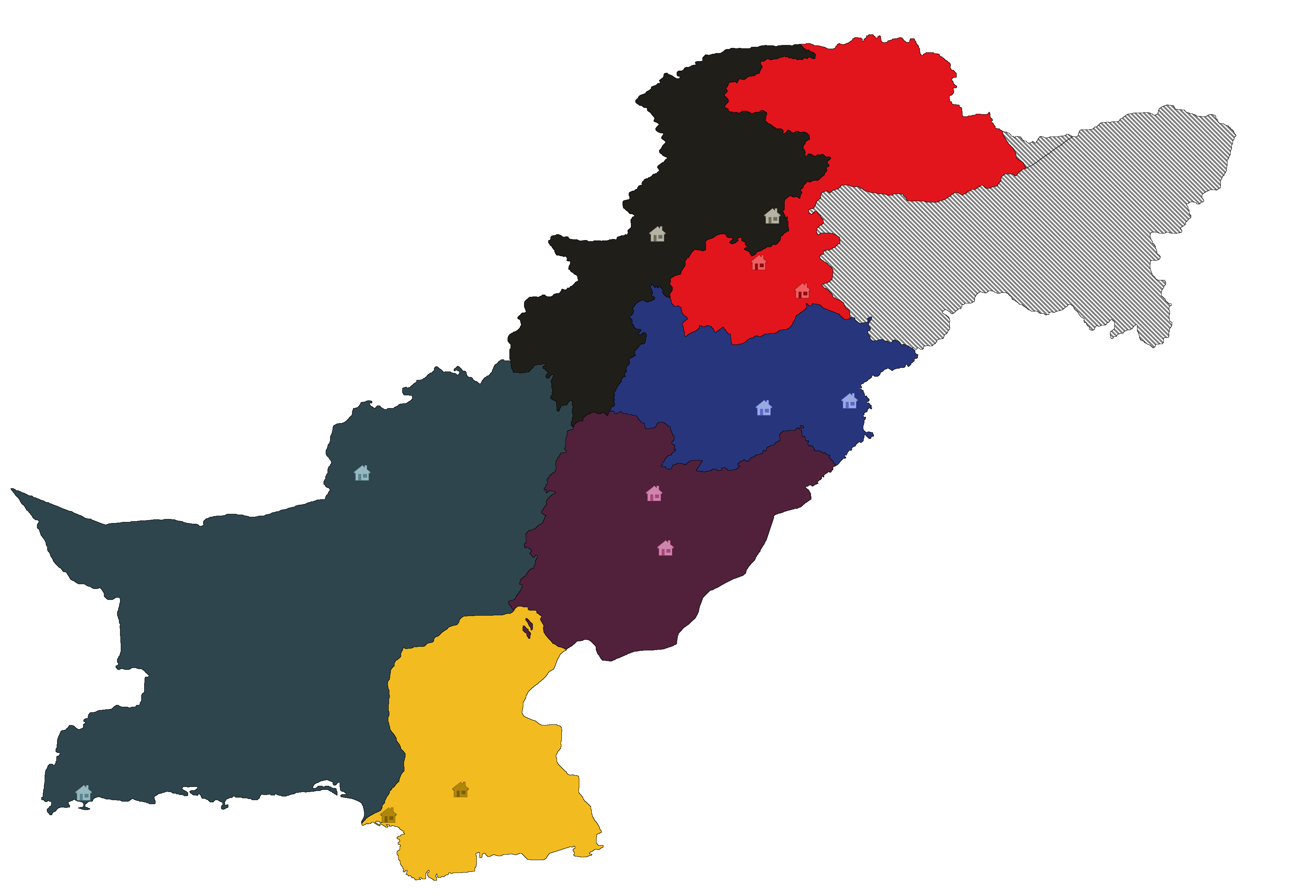
Balochistan; Central Punjab; Khyber Pakhtunkhwa; Northern; Sindh; Southern Punjab

- Balochistan cricket team
- Federal Areas cricket team
- Khyber Pakhtunkhwa cricket team
- Northern
- Punjab cricket teams (Central Punjab, Southern Punjab)
- Sindh cricket team

=== Associations ===
- Abbottabad Falcons
- AJK Jaguars
- Bahawalpur Stags
- Dera Murad Jamali Ibexes
- Faisalabad Wolves
- Sargodha cricket team
- FATA Cheetas
- Dera Ismail Khan cricket team
- Hyderabad Hawks
- Islamabad Leopards
- Karachi cricket teams (Karachi Dolphins, Karachi Zebras)
- Lahore cricket teams (Lahore Eagles, Lahore Lions)
- Larkana Bulls
- Dadu cricket team (Note: Dadu was absorbed into Hyderabad for first-class cricket in 2003–04.)
- Khairpur cricket team
- Sukkur cricket team
- Multan Tigers
- Peshawar Panthers
- Quetta Bears
- Hazara cricket team
- Kalat cricket team
- Rawalpindi Rams
- Sialkot Stallions
- Gujranwala cricket team (Note: Gujranwala and Sheikhupura were absorbed into Sialkot for first-class cricket in 2003–04.)
- Sheikhupura cricket team

=== Departments and educational institutions ===
- Allied Bank Limited cricket team
- Attock Group cricket team
- Combined Services (Pakistan) cricket team
- Dawood Industries cricket team
- Defence Housing Authority cricket team
- Lahore Education Board cricket team
- Habib Bank Limited cricket team
- House Building Finance Corporation cricket team
- Income Tax Department cricket team
- Industrial Development Bank of Pakistan cricket team
- Karachi Education Board cricket team
- Karachi Port Trust cricket team
- Karachi University cricket team
- Muslim Commercial Bank cricket team
- National Bank of Pakistan cricket team
- Pakistan Automobiles Corporation cricket team
- Pakistan Combined Schools
- Pakistan Customs cricket team
- Pakistan International Airlines cricket team
- Pakistan National Shipping Corporation cricket team
- Pakistan Security Printing Corporation cricket team
- Pakistan Steel cricket team
- Pakistan Telecommunication Company Limited cricket team
- Pakistan Universities cricket team
- Pakistan University Grants Commission cricket team
- Public Works Department cricket team
- Punjab University cricket team
- Redco Pakistan Limited cricket team
- Service Industries cricket team
- Sui Southern Gas Company cricket team
- United Bank Limited cricket team
- Zarai Taraqiati Bank Limited cricket team

=== Other ===
- Afghan Cheetahs (T20)
- Central Zone cricket team
- East Pakistan first-class cricket teams
- Pakistan Eaglets
- Rest of Baluchistan cricket team
- Rest of North West Frontier Province cricket team
- Rest of Punjab cricket team
- Rest of Sindh cricket team

=== Franchise teams ===
==== Pakistan Junior League ====
The Pakistan Junior League (PJL) was a professional 20-over cricket league contested by Under-19 teams representing different cities of Pakistan:

- Bahawalpur Royals
- Gujranwala Giants
- Gwadar Sharks
- Hyderabad Hunters
- Mardan Warriors
- Rawalpindi Raiders

==== Kashmir Premier League ====
The Kashmir Premier League (KPL) was a Franchise T20 tournament and is competed between seven franchise teams representing the Kashmir region:

- Muzaffarabad Tigers
- Rawalakot Hawks
- Bagh Stallions
- Mirpur Royals
- Kotli Lions
- Overseas Warriors
- Jammu Janbaz
