= 2025 Pakistan Super League players draft =

Cricket league draft

General information
- Sport: Cricket
- Date: 13 January 2025
- Location: Hazuri Bagh, Lahore, Pakistan

Overview
- League: Pakistan Super League
- Teams: 6
- First selection: Daryl Mitchell, Lahore Qalandars

The player draft for the tenth edition of the Pakistan Super League took place on 13 January 2025.

On 4 January 2025, the Pakistan Cricket Board opened the registration window for foreign players and the trade window.

This was the last draft before moving on to the auction.

== Retained players ==
On 04 January 2025, the retained player's list was announced. The franchises were allowed to retain a maximum of eight players from the previous season. All the franchises fully utilized their quota of player retentions apart from Karachi Kings, Multan Sultans and Peshawar Zalmi.

Class	Islamabad United	Karachi Kings	Lahore Qalandars	Multan Sultans	Peshawar Zalmi	Quetta Gladiators
Platinum	Shadab Khan; Naseem Shah	—N/a	Shaheen Afridi; Fakhar Zaman	Mohammad Rizwan; Usama Mir	Babar Azam; Saim Ayub	—N/a
Diamond	Imad Wasim (mentor); Azam Khan	Hasan Ali; James Vince	Haris Rauf; Sikandar Raza	David Willey (mentor); Iftikhar Ahmed; Usman Khan	Mohammad Haris	Mohammad Amir (mentor); Abrar Ahmed; Rilee Rossouw
Gold	Haider Ali; Salman Ali Agha	Shan Masood; Irfan Khan	Abdullah Shafique; Zaman Khan; Jahandad Khan	Chris Jordan	—N/a	Saud Shakeel; Mohammad Wasim Jr.; Akeal Hosein
Silver	Colin Munro; Rumman Raees	Arafat Minhas; Tim Seifert; Zahid Mahmood	David Wiese	Faisal Akram	Sufiyan Muqeem; Arif Yaqoob; Mehran Mumtaz	Khawaja Nafay; Usman Tariq
Emerging	—N/a	—N/a	—N/a	—N/a	Ali Raza	—N/a

== Draft picks ==
The draft took place at Hazuri Bagh, Lahore on 13 January 2025.

Class	Islamabad United	Karachi Kings	Lahore Qalandars	Multan Sultans	Peshawar Zalmi	Quetta Gladiators
Platinum	Matthew Short	David Warner; Adam Milne; Abbas Afridi (Note: Wild Card: The player's category was changed through their franchise's Wild Card.)	Daryl Mitchell	Michael Bracewell	Tom Kohler-Cadmore (Note: Right To Match card (RTM): Player was picked by another franchise in the draft but their franchise from the previous season used their Right To Match card to bring them back in their squad.)	Mark Chapman; Faheem Ashraf; Finn Allen
Diamond	Jason Holder	Khushdil Shah	Kusal Perera	—N/a	Corbin Bosch; Mohammad Ali	—N/a
Gold	Ben Dwarshuis	Aamir Jamal	—N/a	Mohammad Hasnain; Kamran Ghulam	Abdul Samad; Nahid Rana; Hussain Talat	—N/a
Silver	Salman Irshad; Mohammad Nawaz; Andries Gous	Mir Hamza; Litton Das	Asif Afridi; Asif Ali; Rishad Hossain; Muhammad Akhlaq	Akif Javed; Tayyab Tahir; Gudakesh Motie; Josh Little	Max Bryant; Najibullah Zadran	Khurram Shehzad; Haseebullah Khan; Kyle Jamieson
Emerging	Saad Masood; Hunain Shah	Riazullah; Fawad Ali	Momin Qamar; Mohammad Azab	Shahid Aziz; Ubaid Shah	Maaz Sadaqat	Hassan Nawaz; Mohammad Zeeshan
Supplementary	Riley Meredith; Rassie van der Dussen; Mohammad Shehzad (Note: The player was signed post-draft.); Sahibzada Farhan	Kane Williamson; Mohammad Nabi; Omair Yousuf; Mirza Mamoon	Tom Curran; Sam Billings; Salman Mirza; Muhammad Naeem	Johnson Charles; Shai Hope; Yasir Khan; Muhammad Amir Barki	Alzarri Joseph; Ahmed Daniyal; Mitchell Owen	Kusal Mendis; Sean Abbott; Shoaib Malik; Danish Aziz

== Replacements ==
A replacement player draft took place online on 24 March 2024, in which franchises were allowed to select replacement players for any partially or fully unavailable players. Peshawar reserved their replacement pick for Nahid Rana and Quetta reserved their replacement pick for Mark Chapman.

Player	Team	Replaced with	Unavailability	Reason
Corbin Bosch	PZ	George Linde	Full	Withdrawal
Rassie van der Dussen	IU	Alex Carey	Partial	Personal reasons
Kane Williamson	KK	Saad Baig	Partial	NOC issues
Litton Das	KK	Ben McDermott	Full	Injured
Nahid Rana	PZ	Reserved	Partial	NOC issues
Mark Chapman	QG	Reserved	Partial	NOC issues
Johnson Charles	MS	Ashton Turner	Full	Injured
Alex Carey	IU	Reserved	Full	National Commitment
Matthew Short	IU	Kyle Mayers	Full	Injured
Gudakesh Motie	MS	Curtis Campher	Full	Personal Reasons
