= 2026 Pakistan Super League personnel signings and auction =

Personnel signings for 2026 Pakistan Super League

2026 Pakistan Super League players auction

General information
- Sport: Cricket
- Date: 11 February 2026

Overview
- League: 2026 Pakistan Super League
- Teams: 8

The player auction for the 2026 Pakistan Super League was held on 11 February 2026 in Lahore. It was the first time in PSL history that selection was done through a player auction system for the eleventh season, replacing the draft method that had been used since the league began in 2016.

== Background ==
Ahead of the 2026 season, the PSL expanded from six to eight teams following the auction of two new franchises Hyderabad Kingsmen and Rawalpindiz. The Pakistan Cricket Board, along with all eight franchises, agreed to replace the draft system with a player auction starting from the 11th season, allowing franchises to bid openly for players for the first time in PSL history.

Previously, since its inaugural season in 2016, the PSL had been using a player draft system to form team squads till the ten seasons. Under this system, players were grouped into fixed categories (Platinum, Gold, Silver etc), and franchises selected players in a set order rather than through open bidding.

== Signing and auction rules ==
Team purse was capped at Rs. 45.0 crore and allowed be extended to Rs. 50.5 crore to allow direct signing of one foreign player who has not featured in previous season. All eight PSL franchises bid openly for players with all bids and minimum incremental increases in Pakistani rupees. Players entered the auction with set base prices at four tiers:

- Rs. 4.2 crore
- Rs. 2.2 crore
- Rs. 1.1 crore
- Rs. 0.6 crore

Minimum bid increments vary by price level, with franchises free to bid above the prescribed minimum amounts. Franchises were allowed to select 16 to 20 players, including five to seven overseas players depending on squad size, and must include at least two uncapped Under‑23 players, with one featured in the playing XI. Players selected at the auction enter two‑year contracts with their franchises. Franchises may also directly sign one foreign player who did not play in the previous season outside of the auction process. These signings would be outside of team purse which can be extended to accommodate such direct signings.

Each franchise was allowed to retain a maximum of four players from its existing squad, limited to one player per category, if mutual agreements were reached before the auction. Previously, teams could retain up to eight players and had additional mechanisms such as the right‑to‑match (RTM) option, mentor roles, and brand ambassador places under the draft system. The PCB abolished the RTM option, mentor and brand ambassador provisions for PSL 11.

The two newly inducted franchises were permitted to pre‑select and retain up to four players each from the available pool before the main auction, to match the retention numbers of the existing six franchises.

== Retentions ==
Franchise were allowed to retain upto four players, one in each category before the auction, new franchises were allowed to sign four players to match the retentions of other six franchises.

Player Name	Category	Salary	Team (Note: The franchise Multan Sultans lost their previous owners, thus new owners signed-in who had initially named the team after Sialkot city before rebranding to Multan city. Their salary cap was also increased by Rs. 1.2 crore to allow a squad of 22 players, as compared to the other squads with only 20 players.)
Saim Ayub	Platinum	Rs. 12.6 crore	Hyderabad Kingsmen
Shadab Khan	Platinum	Rs. 7 crore	Islamabad United
Shaheen Shah Afridi	Platinum	Rs. 7 crore	Lahore Qalandars
Babar Azam	Platinum	Rs. 7 crore	Peshawar Zalmi
Abrar Ahmed	Platinum	Rs. 7 crore	Quetta Gladiators
Mohammad Nawaz	Platinum	Rs. 6.16 crore	Multan Sultans
Usman Tariq	Diamond	Rs. 5.6 crore	Quetta Gladiators
Mohammad Rizwan	Platinum	Rs. 5.6 crore	Rawalpindiz
Hassan Ali	Platinum	Rs. 4.76 crore	Karachi Kings
Usman Khan	Diamond	Rs. 4.62 crore	Hyderabad Kingsmen
Sufiyan Muqeem	Diamond	Rs. 4.4 crore	Peshawar Zalmi
Hassan Nawaz	Gold	Rs. 3.92 crore	Quetta Gladiators
Salman Mirza	Diamond	Rs. 3.92 crore	Multan Sultans
Khushdil Shah	Gold	Rs. 3.36 crore	Karachi Kings
Abbas Afridi	Diamond	Rs. 3.08 crore	Karachi Kings
Sam Billings	Diamond	Rs. 3.08 crore	Rawalpindiz
Sikandar Raza	Gold	Rs. 2.8 crore	Lahore Qalandars
Abdul Samad	Gold	Rs. 2.8 crore	Peshawar Zalmi
Ahmed Daniyal	Gold	Rs. 2.24 crore	Multan Sultans
Abdullah Shafique	Diamond	Rs. 2.2 crore	Lahore Qalandars
Akif Javed	Gold	Rs. 1.96 crore	Hyderabad Kingsmen
Ali Raza	Emerging	Rs. 1.96 crore	Peshawar Zalmi
Andries Gous	Silver	Rs. 1.4 crore	Islamabad United
Salman Irshad	Gold	Rs. 1.2 crore	Islamabad United
Zaman Khan	Gold	Rs. 1.12 crore	Rawalpindiz
Shamyl Hussain	Emerging	Rs. 84 lakh	Quetta Gladiators
Saad Masood	Emerging	Rs. 84 lakh	Multan Sultans
Mohammad Naeem	Silver	Rs. 70 lakh	Lahore Qalandars
Saad Baig	Emerging	Rs. 60 lakh	Karachi Kings
Yasir Khan	Emerging	Rs. 60 lakh	Rawalpindiz

== Direct signings ==
Teams were allowed to directly sign one foreign player before the auction who has not played in the previous season on PSL. These signings were outside of the team purse and were up to PKR 55m.

Player Name	Salary	Team
Steve Smith	Rs. 14 crore	Multan Sultans
Moeen Ali	Rs. 6.44 crore	Karachi Kings
Mustafizur Rahman	Rs. 6.44 crore	Lahore Qalandars
Devon Conway	Rs. 6.3 crore	Islamabad United
Aaron Hardie	Rs. 6.3 crore	Peshawar Zalmi
Marnus Labuschagne	Rs. 5.88 crore	Hyderabad Kingsmen
Alzarri Joseph	Rs. 5.6 crore	Quetta Gladiators

== Auction ==
The auction for the full squad was held on 11 February 2026 at Lahore. 888 players including local and foreign registered for the auction at 4 different base prices.

Player Name	Base price (PKR)	Sold price (PKR)	Team
Faheem Ashraf	Rs. 4.2 crore	Rs. 8.5 crore	Islamabad United
David Warner	Rs. 4.2 crore	Rs. 7.9 crore	Karachi Kings
Rilee Rossouw	Rs. 4.2 crore	Rs. 5.5 crore	Quetta Gladiators
Mohammad Ali	Rs. 1.1 crore	Rs. 2.15 crore	Hyderabad Kingsmen
Haris Rauf	Rs. 4.2 crore	Rs. 7.6 crore	Lahore Qalandars
Naseem Shah	Rs. 4.2 crore	Rs. 8.65 crore	Rawalpindiz
Azam Khan	Rs. 1.1 crore	Rs. 3.65 crore	Karachi Kings
Sahibzada Farhan	Rs. 4.2 crore	Rs. 5.7 crore	Multan Sultans
Rishad Hossain	Rs. 1.1 crore	Rs. 1.1 crore	Rawalpindiz
Mehran Mumtaz	Rs. 60 lakh	Rs. 1.2 crore	Islamabad United
Faisal Akram	Rs. 1.1 crore	Rs. 1.25 crore	Quetta Gladiators
Aamir Jamal	Rs. 1.1 crore	Rs. 1.9 crore	Peshawar Zalmi
Arafat Minhas	Rs. 1.1 crore	Rs. 1.1 crore	Quetta Gladiators
Usama Mir	Rs. 2.2 crore	Rs. 3.5 crore	Lahore Qalandars
Jahandad Khan	Rs. 1.1 crore	Rs. 2.5 crore	Quetta Gladiators
Salman Ali Agha	Rs. 4.2 crore	Rs. 5.85 crore	Karachi Kings
Fakhar Zaman	Rs. 4.2 crore	Rs. 7.95 crore	Lahore Qalandars
Daryl Mitchell	Rs. 4.2 crore	Rs. 8.05 crore	Rawalpindiz
Max Bryant	Rs. 60 lakh	Rs. 1.95 crore	Islamabad United
Khurram Shahzad	Rs. 1.1 crore	Rs. 2.7 crore	Peshawar Zalmi
Mohammad Amir	Rs. 4.2 crore	Rs. 5.4 crore	Rawalpindiz
Ubaid Shah	Rs. 60 lakh	Rs. 2.7 crore	Lahore Qalandars
Kusal Perera	Rs. 2.2 crore	Rs. 3.1 crore	Hyderabad Kingsmen
Mohammad Haris	Rs. 1.1 crore	Rs. 2.2 crore	Peshawar Zalmi
Khawaja Nafay	Rs. 1.1 crore	Rs. 6.5 crore	Quetta Gladiators
Haseebullah Khan	Rs. 1.1 crore	Rs. 1.1 crore	Lahore Qalandars
Shahid Aziz	Rs. 60 lakh	Rs. 92.5 lakh	Karachi Kings
Irfan Khan Niazi	Rs. 1.1 crore	Rs. 2.9 crore	Hyderabad Kingsmen
Abdullah Fazal	Rs. 60 lakh	Rs. 67.5 lakh	Rawalpindiz
Mark Chapman	Rs. 4.2 crore	Rs. 7 crore	Islamabad United
Ashton Turner	Rs. 4.2 crore	Rs. 4.2 crore	Multan Sultans
Mohammad Wasim Jr.	Rs. 2.2 crore	Rs. 4.1 crore	Islamabad United
Mir Hamza	Rs. 1.1 crore	Rs. 2.4 crore	Karachi Kings
Adam Zampa	Rs. 4.2 crore	Rs. 4.5 crore	Karachi Kings
Peter Siddle	Rs. 2.2 crore	Rs. 2.5 crore	Multan Sultans
Tabraiz Shamsi	Rs. 2.2 crore	Rs. 2.2 crore	Multan Sultans
Amad Butt	Rs. 60 lakh	Rs. 80 lakh	Rawalpindiz
Wasim Akram Jr.	Rs. 60 lakh	Rs. 62 lakh	Quetta Gladiators
Khan Zaib	Rs. 60 lakh	Rs. 60 lakh	Quetta Gladiators
Mir Hamza Sajjad	Rs. 60 lakh	Rs. 70 lakh	Islamabad United
Mohammad Hamza Sohail	Rs. 60 lakh	Rs. 62.5 lakh	Karachi Kings
Bismillah Khan	Rs. 60 lakh	Rs. 60 lakh	Quetta Gladiators
Khalid Usman	Rs. 60 lakh	Rs. 60 lakh	Peshawar Zalmi
Aqib Ilyas	Rs. 60 lakh	Rs. 60 lakh	Karachi Kings
Mohammad Farooq	Rs. 60 lakh	Rs. 60 lakh	Lahore Qalandars
Sameer Minhas	Rs. 60 lakh	Rs. 1.9 crore	Islamabad United
Saqib Khan	Rs. 60 lakh	Rs. 60 lakh	Quetta Gladiators
Sameen Gul	Rs. 60 lakh	Rs. 60 lakh	Islamabad United
Abdul Subhan	Rs. 60 lakh	Rs. 62.5 lakh	Peshawar Zalmi
Brett Hampton	Rs. 60 lakh	Rs. 60 lakh	Quetta Gladiators
Hassan Khan	Rs. 1.1 crore	Rs. 1.85 crore	Hyderabad Kingsmen
Shayan Jahangir	Rs. 60 lakh	Rs. 60 lakh	Hyderabad Kingsmen
Samuel Harper	Rs. 60 lakh	Rs. 60 lakh	Quetta Gladiators
Shamar Joseph	Rs. 1.1 crore	Rs. 1.1 crore	Islamabad United
Bevon Jacobs	Rs. 60 lakh	Rs. 60 lakh	Quetta Gladiators
Lachlan Shaw	Rs. 60 lakh	Rs. 60 lakh	Multan Sultans
Delano Potgieter	Rs. 60 lakh	Rs. 60 lakh	Multan Sultans
Khuzaima Bin Tanveer	Rs. 60 lakh	Rs. 90 lakh	Karachi Kings
Ottniel Baartman	Rs. 1.1 crore	Rs. 1.1 crore	Hyderabad Kingsmen
Hammad Azam	Rs. 60 lakh	Rs. 60 lakh	Hyderabad Kingsmen
James Vince	Rs. 2.2 crore	Rs. 3 crore	Peshawar Zalmi
Riley Meredith	Rs. 4.2 crore	Rs. 4.2 crore	Hyderabad Kingsmen
Michael Bracewell	Rs. 4.2 crore	Rs. 4.2 crore	Peshawar Zalmi
Dasun Shanaka	Rs. 60 lakh	Rs. 75 lakh	Lahore Qalandars
Kusal Mendis	Rs. 2.2 crore	Rs. 4.2 crore	Peshawar Zalmi
Imad Wasim	Rs. 2.2 crore	Rs. 2.2 crore	Islamabad United
Richard Gleeson	Rs. 1.1 crore	Rs. 1.1 crore	Islamabad United
Johnson Charles	Rs. 1.1 crore	Rs. 2 crore	Karachi Kings
Iftikhar Ahmed	Rs. 60 lakh	Rs. 1.8 crore	Peshawar Zalmi
Josh Philippe	Rs. 1.1 crore	Rs. 2.3 crore	Multan Sultans
Saud Shakeel	Rs. 60 lakh	Rs. 65 lakh	Quetta Gladiators
Shan Masood	Rs. 60 lakh	Rs. 65 lakh	Multan Sultans
Dian Forrester	Rs. 60 lakh	Rs. 60 lakh	Rawalpindiz
Ben McDermott	Rs. 1.1 crore	Rs. 1.1 crore	Quetta Gladiators
Muhammad Waseem	Rs. 1.1 crore	Rs. 1.1 crore	Karachi Kings
Laurie Evans	Rs. 1.1 crore	Rs. 1.1 crore	Rawalpindiz
Nahid Rana	Rs. 60 lakh	Rs. 60 lakh	Peshawar Zalmi
Parvez Hossain	Rs. 60 lakh	Rs. 60 lakh	Lahore Qalandars
Asif Afridi	Rs. 60 lakh	Rs. 2.4 crore	Rawalpindiz
Asif Ali	Rs. 60 lakh	Rs. 60 lakh	Lahore Qalandars
Haider Ali	Rs. 60 lakh	Rs. 1.5 crore	Islamabad United
Hussain Talat	Rs. 60 lakh	Rs. 77.5 lakh	Lahore Qalandars
Ihsanullah	Rs. 60 lakh	Rs. 1.05 crore	Karachi Kings
Kamran Ghulam	Rs. 60 lakh	Rs. 65 lakh	Rawalpindiz
Mohammad Hasnain	Rs. 60 lakh	Rs. 77.5 lakh	Lahore Qalandars
Sharjeel Khan	Rs. 60 lakh	Rs. 60 lakh	Hyderabad Kingsmen
Tayyab Tahir	Rs. 60 lakh	Rs. 60 lakh	Lahore Qalandars
Dipendra Singh Airee	Rs. 60 lakh	Rs. 60 lakh	Islamabad United
Asif Mehmood	Rs. 60 lakh	Rs. 60 lakh	Hyderabad Kingsmen
Fawad Ali	Rs. 60 lakh	Rs. 60 lakh	Rawalpindiz
Hunain Shah	Rs. 60 lakh	Rs. 60 lakh	Hyderabad Kingsmen
Mohammad Amir Khan	Rs. 60 lakh	Rs. 60 lakh	Rawalpindiz
Momin Qamar	Rs. 60 lakh	Rs. 1.075 crore	Multan Sultans
Muhammad Awais Zafar	Rs. 60 lakh	Rs. 60 lakh	Multan Sultans
Rizwan Mehmood	Rs. 60 lakh	Rs. 60 lakh	Hyderabad Kingsmen
Shahzaib Khan	Rs. 60 lakh	Rs. 60 lakh	Rawalpindiz
Tom Curran	Rs. 4.2 crore	Rs. 4.2 crore	Quetta Gladiators
Gudakesh Motie	Rs. 1.1 crore	Rs. 1.1 crore	Lahore Qalandars
Mirza Tahir Baig	Rs. 60 lakh	Rs. 60 lakh	Peshawar Zalmi
Saad Ali	Rs. 60 lakh	Rs. 60 lakh	Hyderabad Kingsmen
Rizwanullah	Rs. 60 lakh	Rs. 60 lakh	Karachi Kings
Tayyab Arif	Rs. 60 lakh	Rs. 60 lakh	Hyderabad Kingsmen

== Coaching staff ==
Role	Islamabad United	Karachi Kings	Kingsmen Hyderabad	Lahore Qalandars	Peshawar Zalmi	Quetta Gladiators	Multan Sultans	Rawalpindi Pindiz
Team Manager	Rehan ul Haq	Haider Azhar		Sameen Rana	Ahad Khan	Azam Khan		Hassan Cheema
Head coach	Luke Ronchi	Ravi Bopara	Jason Gillespie	Russell Domingo	Ottis Gibson	Moin Khan	Tim Paine	
Assistant coach	Jacob Oram		Craig White		Azhar Mahmood			
Batting coach					Misbah-ul-Haq	Iqbal Imam		
Bowling coach					Azhar Mehmood	Wahab Riaz		
Fielding coach			Grant Bradburn					
Analyst			Freddie Wilde					

== Withdrawn players ==
Player	Team	Reason	Replaced by	Ref.
(Afghanistan) Rahmanullah Gurbaz	Peshawar Zalmi	Personal commitment	(Australia) Aaron Hardie	
(Cricket West Indies) Shamar Joseph	Islamabad United	Under mutual consent	(Zimbabwe) Blessing Muzarabani	
(Cricket West Indies) Gudakesh Motie	Lahore Qalandars	Travel Issues & Fatigue	(Sri Lanka) Dunith Wellalage	
(Zimbabwe) Blessing Muzarabani	Islamabad United	To play 2026 IPL	(United Arab Emirates) Muhammad Jawadullah	
(Australia) Spencer Johnson	Quetta Gladiators	To play 2026 IPL	(United States) Ali Khan	
(Sri Lanka) Dasun Shanaka	Lahore Qalandars	To play 2026 IPL	(Australia) Daniel Sams	
(South Africa) Ottniel Baartman	Hyderabad Kingsmen		(Sri Lanka) Maheesh Theekshana	
(Australia) Jake Fraser-McGurk	Rawalpindiz	Personal commitments	(New Zealand) Cole McConchie	
(Bangladesh) Parvez Hossain Emon	Lahore Qalandars	Shoulder injury	(Sri Lanka) Charith Asalanka	
(New Zealand) Bevon Jacobs	Quetta Gladiators	National duty	(Sri Lanka) Dinesh Chandimal	
(United Arab Emirates) Muhammad Waseem	Karachi Kings	National duty	(England) Jason Roy	
(Nepal) Dipendra Singh Airee	Islamabad United	National duty	(Sri Lanka) Pavan Rathnayake	
