= 2024–25 Champions T20 Cup =

1st season of Champions T20 Cup

- Dates: 7 – 25 December 2024
- Administrator: Pakistan Cricket Board
- Cricket format: Twenty20
- Tournament format(s): Round-robin and play-off
- Host: Pakistan
- Champions: Stallions (1st title)
- Runners-up: Markhors
- Participants: 5
- Matches: 22
- Player of the series: Mohammad Ali (Stallions)
- Most runs: Hussain Talat (Stallions) (319)
- Most wickets: Mohammad Ali (Stallions) (22)
- Official website: championscup.pk

The 2024–25 Champions T20 Cup (also known as Bahria Town Champions T20 Cup 2024–25 for sponsorship reasons) was the inaugural edition of the Champions T20 Cup, a Twenty20 competition in Pakistan. The tournament began on 7 December 2024 and the final held on 25 December 2024. Five teams took part in the tournament.

== Team and squads ==
Team	Captain	Mentor
Dolphins	Faheem Ashraf	Sarfaraz Ahmed
Lions	Imam-ul-Haq	Waqar Younis
Markhors	Iftikhar Ahmed	Misbah ul Haq
Panthers	Shadab Khan	Saqlain Mushtaq
Stallions	Mohammad Haris	Shoaib Malik

== Points table ==
Pos	Team	Pld	W	L	NR	Pts	NRR	Qualification
1	Stallions	8	6	2	0	12	0.805	Advanced to Final
2	Markhors	8	6	2	0	12	0.607	Advanced to Qualifier
3	Lions	8	5	3	0	10	1.068	Advanced to Qualifier
4	Panthers	8	3	5	0	6	−0.410	
5	Dolphins	8	0	8	0	0	−2.162	

Source: ESPNcricinfo

== League stage ==
7 December 2024
10:30
Scorecard

Lions; 150/7 (20 overs)	v	Markhors; 154/6 (19 overs)
Awais Zafar 40* (34); Mohammad Sarwar 2/11 (3 overs)		Iftikhar Ahmed 42* (34); Mohammad Salman 3/21 (4 overs)

Markhors won by 4 wickets
Rawalpindi Cricket Stadium, Rawalpindi
Umpires: Imran Javed and Zulfiqar Jan
Player of the match: Saad Masood (Markhors)

- Markhors won the toss and elected to field.
- Shahid Aziz, Mohammad Salman and Awais Zafar (Lions) all made their T20 debuts.
- Mohammad Nawaz (Markhors) scored his 3,000th run in T20s.

7 December 2024
15:30 (D/N)
Scorecard

Stallions; 216/3 (20 overs)	v	Panthers; 181 (19.1 overs)
Hussain Talat 101* (50); Mohammad Ibtisam 2/36 (4 overs)		Haider Ali 54 (26); Usman Tariq 3/25 (4 overs)

Stallions won by 35 runs
Rawalpindi Cricket Stadium, Rawalpindi
Umpires: Khalid Mahmood and Ahmed Shahab
Player of the match: Hussain Talat (Stallions)

- Panthers won the toss and elected to field.
- Mohammad Ibtisam (Panthers) Taimur Khan and Maaz Sadaqat (Stallions) all made their T20 debuts.
- Hussain Talat (Stallions) scoherd his first century in T20s.

8 December 2024
12:00
Scorecard

Dolphins; 160/8 (20 overs)	v	Panthers; 162/2 (16 overs)
Muhammad Hurraira 37 (32); Amad Butt 3/19 (4 overs)		Umar Siddiq 78* (53); Salman Irshad 2/26 (3 overs)

Panthers won by 8 wickets
Rawalpindi Cricket Stadium, Rawalpindi
Umpires: Zulfiqar Jan and Ahmed Shahab
Player of the match: Umar Siddiq (Panthers)

- Panthers won the toss and elected to field.
- Ghazi Ghori (Dolphins) and Ali Raza (Panthers) both made their T20 debuts.

9 December 2024
12:00
Scorecard

Stallions; 162/5 (20 overs)	v	Lions; 150/7 (20 overs)
Hussain Talat 51* (36); Muhammad Musa 2/31 (4 overs)		Imam-ul-Haq 43 (28); Shoaib Malik 2/23 (4 overs); Usman Tariq 2/23 (4 overs)

Stallions won by 12 runs
Rawalpindi Cricket Stadium, Rawalpindi
Umpires: Zulfiqar Jan and Khalid Mahmood
Player of the match: Shoaib Malik (Stallions)

- Lions won the toss and elected to field.
- Shamyl Hussain (Stallions) made his T20 debut.

10 December 2024
12:00
Scorecard

Dolphins; 128/9 (20 overs)	v	Markhors; 132/8 (18.5 overs)
Muhammad Akhlaq 40 (33); Mohammad Nawaz		Khawaja Nafay 68 (41); Sameen Gul 3/23 (3 overs)

Markhors won by 2 wickets
Rawalpindi Cricket Stadium, Rawalpindi
Umpires: Rana Arshad and Imran Javed
Player of the match: Khawaja Nafay (Markhors)

- Markhors won the toss and elected to field.

11 December 2024
12:00
Scorecard

Panthers; 123 (19.2 overs)	v	Lions; 126/2 (14.3 overs)
Danish Aziz 34 (27); Shahid Aziz 4/20 (3.2 overs)		Imam-ul-Haq 45 (38); Mubasir Khan 1/20 (2.3 overs)

Lions won by 8 wicket
Rawalpindi Cricket Stadium, Rawalpindi
Umpires: Faisal Afridi and Zulfiqar Jan
Player of the match: Shahid Aziz (Lions)

- Lions won the toss and elected to field.
- Shahzaib Khan (Lions) made his T20 debut.

12 December 2024
11:00
Scorecard

Markhors; 170/6 (20 overs)	v	Stallions; 167/6 (20 overs)
Fakhar Zaman 39 (32); Usman Tariq 2/20 (4 overs)		Maaz Sadaqat 82 (53); Nisar Ahmad 3/23 (4 overs)

Markhors won by 3 runs
Rawalpindi Cricket Stadium, Rawalpindi
Umpires: Faisal Afridi and Khalid Mahmood
Player of the match: Nisar Ahmad (Markhors)

- Stallions won the toss and elected to field.

12 December 2024
15:30 (D/N)
Scorecard

Lions; 194/5 (20 overs)	v	Dolphins; 159 (19.4 overs)
Imam-ul-Haq 65 (48); Qasim Akram 3/31 (4 overs)		Sahibzada Farhan 54 (42); Muhammad Musa 4/23 (4 overs)

Lions won by 35 runs
Rawalpindi Cricket Stadium, Rawalpindi
Umpires: Rana Arshad and Mohammad Asif
Player of the match: Khushdil Shah (Lions)

- Dolphins won the toss and elected to field.

13 December 2024
12:00
Scorecard

Stallions; 190/4 (20 overs)	v	Dolphins; 185/9 (20 overs)
Hussain Talat 57* (34); Mohammad Rameez jnr 2/29 (4 overs)		Sahibzada Farhan 59 (38); Usman Tariq 2/22 (4 overs)

Stallions won by 5 runs
Rawalpindi Cricket Stadium, Rawalpindi
Umpires: Mohammad Asif and Khalid Mahmood
Player of the match: Mohammad Mohsin (Stallions)

- Dolphins won the toss and elected to field.

13 December 2024
15:30 (D/N)
Scorecard

Markhors; 163/8 (20 overs)	v	Panthers; 169/4 (20 overs)
Saad Masood 63* (39); Usama Mir 2/14 (4 overs)		Haider Ali 62* (29); Mohammad Imran 2/17 (3 overs)

Panthers won by 6 wickets
Rawalpindi Cricket Stadium, Rawalpindi
Umpires: Faisal Afridi and Mohammad Sajid
Player of the match: Haider Ali (Panthers)

- Panthers won the toss and elected to field.

15 December 2024
11:00
Scorecard

Panthers; 168/7 (20 overs)	v	Stallions; 170/4 (19.4 ocers)
Haider Ali 73 (49); Mohammad Ali 4/28 (4 overs)		Mohammad Haris 61 (35); Usama Mir 2/30 (4 overs)

Stallions won by 6 wickets
Rawalpindi Cricket Stadium, Rawalpindi
Umpires: Mohammad Asif and Mohammad Sajid
Player of the match: Mohammad Haris (Stallions)

- Stallions won the toss and elected to field.

15 December 2024
15:30 (D/N)
Scorecard

Lions; 187/7 (20 overs)	v	Markhors; 189/7 (20 overs)
Aamer Yamin 39* (27); Nisar Ahmad 2/40 (4 overs)		Iftikhar Ahmed 66 (31); Shahid Aziz 4/42 (4 overs)

Markhors won by 3 wickets
Rawalpindi Cricket Stadium, Rawalpindi
Umpires: Faisal Afridi and Rana Arshad
Player of the match: Iftikhar Ahmed (Markhors)

- Lions won the toss and elected to bat.

16 December 2024
11:00
Scorecard

Dolphins; 106/9 (20 overs)	v	Panthers; 109/4 (15 overs)
Faheem Ashraf 25 (34); Mohammad Wasim Jr. 3/28 (4 overs)		Abdul Bangalzai 51 (38); Sameen Gul 2/16 (4 overs)

Panthers won by 6 wickets
Rawalpindi Cricket Stadium, Rawalpindi
Umpires: Faisal Afridi and Mohammad Asif
Player of the match: Abdul Bangalzai (Panthers)

- Panthers won the toss and elected to field.

17 December 2024
12:00
Scorecard

Stallions; 168 (20 overs)	v	Lions; 169/7 (20 overs)
Hussain Talat 43 (29); Muhammad Musa 3/32 (4 overs)		Hasan Nawaz 74 (54); Maaz Sadaqat 2/16 (2 overs)

Lions won by 3 wickets
Rawalpindi Cricket Stadium, Rawalpindi
Umpires: Faisal Afridi and Imranullah Aslam
Player of the match: Hasan Nawaz (Lions)

- Lions won the toss and elected to field.

18 December 2024
12:00
Scorecard

Dolphins; 139/8 (20 overs)	v	Markhors; 140/2 (14.1 overs)
Waqar Ahmed; Nisar Ahmad 4/22 (4 overs)		Khawaja Nafay 66* (44); Shayan Sheikh 2/16 (3 overs)

Markhors won by 8 wickets
Rawalpindi Cricket Stadium, Rawalpindi
Umpires: Mohammad Asif and Mohammad Sajid
Player of the match: Nisar Ahmad (Markhors)

- Markhors won the toss and elected to field.

19 December 2024
12:00
Scorecard

Lions; 160 (19.2 overs)	v	Panthers; 152/6 (20 overs)
Imam-ul-Haq 57 (36); Usama Mir 4/23 (4 overs)		Danish Aziz 38* (27); Sharoon Siraj 3/19 (3 overs)

Lions won by 8 runs
Rawalpindi Cricket Stadium, Rawalpindi
Umpires: Imranullah Aslam and Asif Yaqoob
Player of the match: Sharoon Siraj (Lions)

- Panthers won the toss and elected to field.

20 December 2024
11:00
Scorecard

Stallions; 147/9 (20 overs)	v	Markhors; 118 (18.3 overs)
Shoaib Malik 27 (28); Akif Javed 2/16 (4 overs)		Saad Masood 38 (29); Mohammad Ali 4/13 (3.3 overs)

Stallions won by 29 runs
Rawalpindi Cricket Stadium, Rawalpindi
Umpires: Imranullah Aslam and Asif Yaqoob
Player of the match: Jahandad Khan (Stallions)

- Markhors won the toss and elected to field.

20 December 2024
15:30 (D/N)
Scorecard

Dolphins; 71 (16 overs)	v	Lions; 72/3 (9 overs)
Waqar Ahmed 16 (16); Afaq Afridi 5/18 (4 overs)		Omair Yousuf 34 (30); Faheem Ashraf 2/20 (3 overs)

Lions won by 7 wickets
Rawalpindi Cricket Stadium, Rawalpindi
Umpires: Faisal Afridi and Mohammad Sajid

- Dolphins won the toss and elected to bat.
- Awais Ali, Muhammad Riazullah (Dolphins) and Afaq Afridi (Lions) all made their T20 debuts.
- Afaq Afridi (Lions) took his first five-wicket haul and hat-trick in T20s.

21 December 2024
11:00
Scorecard

Panthers; 155/6 (20 overs)	v	Markhors; 160/4 (13.3 overs)
Umar Siddiq 41 (34); Mohammad Imran 3/35 (4 overs)		Mohammad Imran 69* (34); Mohammad Ibtisam 2/41 (3 overs)

Markhors won by 6 wickets
Rawalpindi Cricket Stadium, Rawalpindi
Umpires: Zulfiqar Jan and Asif Yaqoob
Player of the match: Mohammad Imran (Markhors)

- Markhors won the toss and elected to field.

21 December 2024
15:30 (D/N)
Scorecard

Dolphins; 131 (20 overs)	v	Stallions; 133/4 (14 overs)
Qasim Akram 40 (34); Mohammad Ali 4/15 (4 overs)		Mohammad Haris 52* (30); Mohammad Rameez 2/29 (4 overs)

Stallions won by 6 wickets
Rawalpindi Cricket Stadium, Rawalpindi
Umpires: Faisal Afridi and Imranullah Aslam
Player of the match: Mohammad Ali (Stallions)

- Dolphins won the toss and elected bat.
- Tayyab Arif and Shahbaz Javed (Dolphins) both made their T20 debuts.

== Finals ==
Qualifier			Final
			1	Stallions	199/5 (20 overs)
2	Markhors	180/6 (20 overs)	QW	Markhors	124 (19.1 overs)
3	Lions	151/9 (20 overs)

=== Qualifier ===
23 December 2024
15:30 (D/N)
Scorecard

Markhors; 180/6 (20 overs)	v	Lions; 151/9 (20 overs)
Fakhar Zaman 89 (64); Afaq Afridi 3/29 (4 overs)		Mohammad Taha 44 (28); Akif Javed 3/22 (4 overs)

Markhors won by 29 runs
Rawalpindi Cricket Stadium, Rawalpindi
Umpires: Faisal Afridi and Asif Yaqoob
Player of the match: Fakhar Zaman (Markhors)

- Lions won the toss and elected to field.

=== Final ===
25 December 2024
15:30 (D/N)
Scorecard

Stallions; 199/5 (20 overs)	v	Markhors; 124 (19.1 overs)
Yasir Khan 100 (57); Akif Javed 2/32 (4 overs)		Mohammad Faizan 43 (33); Mohammad Ali 3/19 (4 overs)

Stallions won by 75 runs
Rawalpindi Cricket Stadium, Rawalpindi
Umpires: Rashid Riaz and Asif Yaqoob
Player of the match: Yasir Khan (Stallions)

- Stallions won the toss and elected to bat.
