= 2025 Pakistan Super League =

10th edition of the Pakistan Super League

2025 Pakistan Super League پاکستان سپر لیگ ۲۰۲۵
- Official logo of HBL PSL X (Note: See official nomenclature and hashtag on the official website.)
- Dates: 11 April – 25 May 2025
- Administrator: Pakistan Cricket Board
- Cricket format: Twenty20
- Tournament format(s): Double round robin and playoffs
- Champions: Lahore Qalandars (3rd title)
- Runners-up: Quetta Gladiators
- Participants: 6
- Matches: 34
- Player of the series: Hassan Nawaz (QG)
- Most runs: Sahibzada Farhan (IU) (449)
- Most wickets: Shaheen Afridi (LQ) (19)
- Official website: psl-t20.com

The 2025 Pakistan Super League (branded as HBL PSL X) was the tenth edition of the Pakistan Super League, a professional franchise Twenty20 cricket league organized by the Pakistan Cricket Board (PCB). The tournament was played between six teams in a double round robin and page playoff system.

Originally scheduled to take place across four cities in Pakistan from 11 April to 18 May 2025, the league was delayed to 25 May amid the 2025 India–Pakistan conflict.

In the final, Lahore Qalandars defeated Quetta Gladiators by 6 wickets, becoming the second team to win the PSL title for the third time.

== Background ==
In May 2024, the PCB planned the league's tenth edition to take place from April to May to host the 2025 ICC Champions Trophy during February and March. This meant that the tournament's schedule coincided for the first time with that of 2025 Indian Premier League. The season was the last under the ten-year agreement for a six-team structure, HBL Pakistan's title sponsorship, and then ongoing broadcast rights deals. (Note: In 2019, rights for Multan Sultans were sold for seven years. The other five teams existed since the league's formation in 2016, along with HBL's title sponsorship. The broadcast rights were last awarded in 2024 for two years.) The PCB planned to expand the league to eight teams from 2026.

== Squads ==
The squads were finalized with the draft in Lahore on 13 January 2025, after the franchises announced their retained players. The new squad was finalized on 16 May.

Islamabad United	Karachi Kings	Lahore Qalandars	Multan Sultans	Peshawar Zalmi	Quetta Gladiators
Shadab Khan (c); Salman Ali Agha (vc); Azam Khan (wk); Haider Ali; Imad Wasim; Colin Munro; Jason Holder; Ben Dwarshuis; Salman Irshad; Mohammad Nawaz; Andries Gous (wk); Saad Masood; Hunain Shah; Riley Meredith; Sahibzada Farhan; Naseem Shah; Kyle Mayers; Alex Hales; Rassie van der Dussen; James Neesham; Tymal Mills	David Warner (c); Hasan Ali (vc); Liton Das (wk); James Vince; Arafat Minhas; Irfan Khan Niazi; Zahid Mahmood; Tim Seifert (wk); Shan Masood; Abbas Afridi; Khushdil Shah; Aamir Jamal; Mir Hamza; Riazullah; Mohammad Nabi; Omair Yousuf; Mirza Mamoon; Shahnawaz Dahani; Saad Baig; Ben McDermott; George Munsey; Kane Williamson; Fawad Ali	Shaheen Afridi (c); Fakhar Zaman (vc); Haris Rauf; Abdullah Shafique; Zaman Khan; Jahandad Khan; Sikandar Raza; David Wiese; Daryl Mitchell; Kusal Perera (wk); Asif Afridi; Asif Ali; Rishad Hossain; Muhammad Akhlaq (wk); Momin Qamar; Mohammad Azab; Tom Curran; Sam Billings (wk); Salman Mirza; Muhammad Naeem; Shakib Al Hasan; Bhanuka Rajapaksa; Mehidy Hasan Miraz	Mohammad Rizwan (c, wk); David Willey (vc); Usman Khan; Iftikhar Ahmed; Usama Mir; Faisal Akram; Chris Jordan; Michael Bracewell; Mohammad Hasnain; Kamran Ghulam; Akif Javed; Tayyab Tahir; Shahid Aziz; Ubaid Shah; Ashton Turner; Shai Hope (wk); Yasir Khan; Muhammad Amir Barki; Curtis Campher; Aamer Azmat; Dilshan Madushanka; Peter Hatzoglou	Babar Azam (c); Saim Ayub (vc); Mohammad Haris (wk); Arif Yaqoob; Mehran Mumtaz; Sufiyan Muqeem; Ali Raza; Tom Kohler-Cadmore (wk); Mohammad Ali; Abdul Samad; Hussain Talat; Nahid Rana; Max Bryant; Najibullah Zadran; Maaz Sadaqat; Alzarri Joseph; Ahmed Daniyal; George Linde; Luke Wood; Daniel Sams	Saud Shakeel (c); Rilee Rossouw (vc); Mohammad Amir; Mohammad Wasim Jr.; Abrar Ahmed; Khawaja Nafay; Akeal Hosein; Usman Tariq; Faheem Ashraf; Finn Allen; Khurram Shahzad; Haseebullah Khan (wk); Kyle Jamieson; Hassan Nawaz; Mohammad Zeeshan; Kusal Mendis (wk); Sean Abbott; Shoaib Malik; Danish Aziz; Avishka Fernando; Dinesh Chandimal; Gulbadin Naib

== Venues ==
The tournament took place across four cities; Karachi, Lahore, Multan, and Rawalpindi. While Rawalpindi Stadium remained the home ground for Peshawar Zalmi, Gaddafi Stadium was the home ground for Quetta Gladiators. The Karachi and Lahore stadiums were briefly renovated, and they were re-inaugurated in February 2025. Tickets went on sale on 3 April 2025. Initially, the Pakistan Cricket Board had planned to stage two matches at the Imran Khan Cricket Stadium in Peshawar, following the completion of renovation work at the venue. However, the proposed fixtures were later dropped due to the stadium not being fully ready to host Pakistan Super League matches, including pending infrastructure and operational requirements. As a result, no matches were held in Peshawar.

Later, one home match in Multan was shifted to Lahore due to extreme weather conditions and logistics issues. The playoff stage was completely shifted to Lahore as well, and another league stage match was shifted from Multan to Rawalpindi.

City	Lahore	Multan	Karachi	Rawalpindi
Stadium	Gaddafi Stadium	Multan Cricket Stadium	National Stadium	Rawalpindi Cricket Stadium
Matches	15	3	5	11
Home teams	Lahore Qalandars; Quetta Gladiators	Multan Sultans	Karachi Kings	Islamabad United; Peshawar Zalmi
Image				
Capacity	34,000	30,000	28,000	15,000
2025 Pakistan Super League is located in Pakistan

== Match officials ==
On 7 April 2025, the PCB announced the list of thirteen umpires and seven referees for the league stage. They include four members of the Elite Panel of ICC Umpires, four of the PCB's International Panel of ICC Umpires, and four of the Elite Panel of PCB Umpires. They further include one member of Elite Panel of ICC Referees and two of PCB's International Panel of ICC Referees. The Match Official's Technology, powered by Hawk-Eye Innovations, will include live umpire communications through handheld tablets for auto no-ball detection, instant Decision Review System, innings timers, match logging, and real-time multi-angle replays.

=== Umpires ===
- Kumar Dharmasena
- Paul Reiffel
- Chris Brown
- Alex Wharf
- Ahsan Raza
- Asif Yaqoob
- Faisal Afridi
- Rashid Riaz
- Nasir Hussain
- Abdul Moqeet
- Zulfiqar Jan

=== Referees ===
- Roshan Mahanama
- Ranjan Madugalle
- Ali Naqvi
- Muhammad Javed
- Nadeem Arshad
- Iftikhar Ahmed
- Iqbal Sheikh

== Marketing ==
=== Title anthem ===
The season's logo variant was revealed on 4 February 2025, with nomenclature as HBL PSL X. The official anthem "X Dekho" was released on 2 April, and opening ceremony was held at Rawalpindi stadium on 11 April.

=== Broadcast and media ===
In 2025, the league introduced simultaneous commentary in English and Urdu; PTV Sports returned with A Sports to share the broadcast feeds, while Walee Technologies sub-licensed various platforms for live streaming. Along with eight international commentators, the PCB listed thirteen national commentators. Zainab Abbas and Erin Holland presented the season.

=== Cancer awareness ===
The childhood cancer awareness day and the breast cancer awareness day were observed on 3 and 19 May respectively, with the stadiums themed with the golden ribbon and pink ribbon respectively.

=== Tribute to the Armed Forces ===
Pakistan Armed Forces were paid tribute on 17 and 18 May, with Sahir Ali Bagga, Asrar, and Shuja Haider taking stage to perform patriotic songs.

== Boycott calls and postponing ==
=== Pro-Palestinian campaigns ===
Like previous year, the league yet again faced boycott campaigns from Pro-Palestinian groups in view of Gaza war, mainly because of sponsorships by KFC and Pepsi, claiming their parent companies' affiliation with pro-Israeli stances. Empty stadiums were noted particularly in Karachi, and poor traffic conditions, unprofessional security arrangement, and many other issues were heavily criticised. Although, large gathering was reported in Karachi for Gaza Solidarity March on 13 April 2025.

=== Conflict ===
In aftermath of 2025 Pahalgam attack, Sony Sports Network and FanCode stopped broadcasting the tournament in India after the first thirteen matches, while Indian media personnel left Pakistan, with the PCB finding substitutes.

On 8 May, the match between Karachi Kings and Peshawar Zalmi at Rawalpindi Cricket Stadium was postponed after Indian loitering munitions killed a civilian near the stadium. Later that night, the PCB announced to shift the remaining fixtures and playoff stage to UAE to ensure safety and security, however, scrapped the plan the next day and postponed the league upon instructions by then Prime Minister Shehbaz Sharif.

As ceasefire happened over the conflict on 10 May, the PCB announced to resume the league in Pakistan, and contacted the foreign players to re-join after they were off-boarded to Dubai. The Hawk-Eye team that supplies the DRS technology did not travel back to Pakistan after the resumption of the league.

== League stage ==
=== Format ===
Each team plays every other team twice in a double round robin format; one home match and one away match, with the top four teams in the points table advancing to the playoffs.

=== Points table ===
Pos	Team	Pld	W	L	NR	Pts	NRR	Qualification
1	Quetta Gladiators (R)	10	7	2	1	15	1.393	Advance to Qualifier 1
2	Islamabad United (3rd)	10	6	4	0	12	0.372	Advance to Qualifier 1
3	Karachi Kings (4th)	10	6	4	0	12	0.049	Advance to Eliminator
4	Lahore Qalandars (C)	10	5	4	1	11	1.036	Advance to Eliminator
5	Peshawar Zalmi	10	4	6	0	8	−0.293	
6	Multan Sultans	10	1	9	0	2	−2.449	

Source: ESPNcricinfo
(C) Champions; (R) Runners-up

=== Match summary ===
Team	Group matches										Playoffs		
Team	1	2	3	4	5	6	7	8	9	10	E1/Q	E2	F
Islamabad United	2	4	6	8	10	10	10	10	10	12	L	L	
Karachi Kings	2	2	4	4	6	6	8	10	12	12	L		
Lahore Qalandars	0	2	4	4	4	6	8	9	9	11	W	W	W
Multan Sultans	0	0	0	2	2	2	2	2	2	2			
Peshawar Zalmi	0	0	2	2	4	4	6	8	8	8			
Quetta Gladiators	2	2	2	4	6	8	9	11	13	15	W		L

Win	Loss	No result

- Note: The total points at the end of each group match are listed.
- Note: Click on the points (group matches) or W/L (playoffs) to see the match summary.

Visitor team →	IU	KK	LQ	MS	PZ	QG
Home team ↓	IU	KK	LQ	MS	PZ	QG
Islamabad United		Islamabad; 79 runs	Islamabad; 8 wickets	Islamabad; 47 runs	Islamabad; 102 runs	Quetta; 109 runs
Karachi Kings	Islamabad; 6 wickets		Lahore; 65 runs	Karachi; 4 wickets	Karachi; 2 wickets	Karachi; 56 runs
Lahore Qalandars	Lahore; 88 runs	Karachi; 4 wickets		Lahore; 5 wickets	Peshawar; 7 wickets	Match abandoned
Multan Sultans	Islamabad; 7 wickets	Karachi; 87 runs	Multan; 33 runs		Peshawar; 7 wickets	Quetta; 2 wickets
Peshawar Zalmi	Peshawar; 6 wickets	Karachi; 23 runs	Lahore; 26 runs	Peshawar; 120 runs		Quetta; 80 runs
Quetta Gladiators	Quetta; 2 wickets	Quetta; 5 runs	Lahore; 79 runs	Quetta; 10 wickets	Quetta; 64 runs	

Home team won	Visitor team won

- Note: Results listed are according to the home (horizontal) and visitor (vertical) teams.
- Note: Click on a result to see a summary of the match.

== Fixtures ==
On 28 February 2025, the PCB had scheduled the fixtures during 11 April to 18 May. However, on 13 May, the PCB rescheduled the last 4 matches and the playoff stage during 17 May to 25 May.

Match 1
11 April 2025
20:30 (N)
Scorecard

Lahore Qalandars; 139 (19.2 overs)	v	Islamabad United (H); 143/2 (17.4 overs)
Abdullah Shafique 66 (38); Jason Holder 4/26 (4 overs)		Colin Munro 59 (42); Asif Afridi 1/15 (4 overs)

Islamabad United won by 8 wickets
Rawalpindi Cricket Stadium, Rawalpindi
Umpires: Chris Brown (NZ) and Ahsan Raza (Pak)
Player of the match: Jason Holder (Islamabad United)

- Islamabad United won the toss and elected to field.
- Muhammad Naeem (Lahore Qalandars) made his T20 debut.

Match 2
12 April 2025
15:30
Scorecard

Quetta Gladiators; 216/3 (20 overs)	v	Peshawar Zalmi; 136 (15.1 overs)
Saud Shakeel 59 (42); Ali Raza 1/31 (4 overs)		Saim Ayub 50 (38); Abrar Ahmed 4/42 (4 overs)

Quetta Gladiators won by 80 runs
Rawalpindi Cricket Stadium, Rawalpindi
Umpires: Ahsan Raza (Pak) and Rashid Riaz (Pak)
Player of the match: Abrar Ahmed (Quetta Gladiators)

- Peshawar Zalmi won the toss and elected to field.

Match 3
12 April 2025
20:00 (N)
Scorecard

Multan Sultans; 234/3 (20 overs)	v	Karachi Kings (H); 236/6 (19.2 overs)
Mohammad Rizwan 105* (63); Khushdil Shah 1/33 (4 overs)		James Vince 101 (43); Akif Javed 3/41 (4 overs)

Karachi Kings won by 4 wickets
National Stadium, Karachi
Attendance: 5,000
Umpires: Alex Wharf (Eng) and Asif Yaqoob (Pak)
Player of the match: James Vince (Karachi Kings)

- Karachi Kings won the toss and elected to field.
- Fawad Ali (Karachi Kings) made his T20 debut.

Match 4
13 April 2025
20:00 (N)
Scorecard

Lahore Qalandars; 219/6 (20 overs)	v	Quetta Gladiators; 140 (16.2 overs)
Fakhar Zaman 67 (39); Abrar Ahmed 2/33 (4 overs)		Rilee Rossouw 44 (19); Rishad Hossain 3/31 (4 overs)

Lahore Qalandars won by 79 runs
Rawalpindi Cricket Stadium, Rawalpindi
Umpires: Chris Brown (NZ) and Ahsan Raza (Pak)
Player of the match: Fakhar Zaman (Lahore Qalandars)

- Quetta Gladiators won the toss and elected to field.

Match 5
14 April 2025
20:00 (N)
Scorecard

(H) Islamabad United; 243/5 (20 overs)	v	Peshawar Zalmi; 141 (18.2 overs)
Sahibzada Farhan 106 (52); Alzarri Joseph 2/39 (4 overs)		Mohammad Haris 87 (47); Imad Wasim 3/26 (4 overs)

Islamabad United won by 102 runs
Rawalpindi Cricket Stadium, Rawalpindi
Umpires: Aleem Dar (Pak) and Nasir Hussain (Pak)
Player of the match: Sahibzada Farhan (Islamabad United)

- Islamabad United won the toss and elected to bat.

Match 6
15 April 2025
20:00 (N)
Scorecard

Lahore Qalandars; 201/6 (20 overs)	v	Karachi Kings (H); 136 (19.1 overs)
Fakhar Zaman 76 (47); Hasan Ali 4/28 (4 overs)		Khushdil Shah 39 (27); Rishad Hossain 3/26 (4 overs)

Lahore Qalandars won by 65 runs
National Stadium, Karachi
Umpires: Abdul Muqeet (Pak) and Paul Reiffel (Aus)
Player of the match: Fakhar Zaman (Lahore Qalandars)

- Lahore Qalandars won the toss and elected to bat.

Match 7
16 April 2025
20:00 (N)
Scorecard

(H) Islamabad United; 202/6 (20 overs)	v	Multan Sultans; 155 (18.4 overs)
Sahibzada Farhan 53 (35); Chris Jordan 2/41 (4 overs)		Mohammad Rizwan 38 (27); Jason Holder 4/25 (4 overs)

Islamabad United won by 47 runs
Rawalpindi Cricket Stadium, Rawalpindi
Umpires: Chris Brown (NZ) and Ahsan Raza (Pak)
Player of the match: Jason Holder (Islamabad United)

- Multan Sultans won the toss and elected to field.

Match 8
18 April 2025
20:00 (N)
Scorecard

(H) Karachi Kings; 175/7 (20 overs)	v	Quetta Gladiators; 119/9 (20 overs)
James Vince 70 (47); Ali Majid 2/29 (4 overs)		Saud Shakeel 33* (40); Hasan Ali 3/27 (4 overs)

Karachi Kings won by 56 runs
National Stadium, Karachi
Umpires: Tariq Rasheed (Pak) and Paul Reiffel (Aus)
Player of the match: James Vince (Karachi Kings)

- Karachi Kings won the toss and elected to bat.

Match 9
19 April 2025
20:00 (N)
Scorecard

Peshawar Zalmi; 227/7 (20 overs)	v	Multan Sultans; 107 (15.5 overs)
Tom Kohler-Cadmore 52 (30); David Willey 2/36 (4 overs)		Usman Khan 44 (22); Ali Raza 4/21 (4 overs)

Peshawar Zalmi won by 120 runs
Rawalpindi Cricket Stadium, Rawalpindi
Umpires: Chris Brown (NZ) and Aleem Dar (Pak)
Player of the match: Abdul Samad (Peshawar Zalmi)

- Peshawar Zalmi won the toss and elected to bat.
- This was the largest victory in PSL history in terms of runs.

Match 10
20 April 2025
20:00 (N)
Scorecard

(H) Karachi Kings; 128/7 (20 overs)	v	Islamabad United; 129/4 (17.1 overs)
Tim Seifert 30 (37); Shadab Khan 2/17 (4 overs)		Shadab Khan 47 (40); Hasan Ali 2/28 (4 overs)

Islamabad United won by 6 wickets
National Stadium, Karachi
Umpires: Alex Wharf (Eng) and Asif Yaqoob (Pak)
Player of the match: Shadab Khan (Islamabad United)

- Islamabad United won the toss and elected to field.

Match 11
21 April 2025
20:00 (N)
Scorecard

Peshawar Zalmi; 147/8 (20 overs)	v	Karachi Kings (H); 148/8 (19.3 overs)
Babar Azam 46 (41); Khushdil Shah 3/20 (3 overs)		David Warner 60 (47); Luke Wood 3/28 (4 overs)

Karachi Kings won by 2 wickets
National Stadium, Karachi
Umpires: Faisal Afridi (Pak) and Paul Reiffel (Aus)
Player of the match: Khushdil Shah (Karachi Kings)

- Karachi Kings won the toss and elected to field.

Match 12
22 April 2025
20:00 (N)
Scorecard

(H) Multan Sultans; 228/5 (20 overs)	v	Lahore Qalandars; 195/9 (20 overs)
Yasir Khan 87 (44); Rishad Hossain 2/45 (4 overs)		Sikandar Raza 50* (27); Ubaid Shah 3/37 (4 overs)

Multan Sultans won by 33 runs
Multan Cricket Stadium, Multan
Umpires: Chris Brown (NZ) and Rashid Riaz (Pak)
Player of the match: Yasir Khan (Multan Sultans)

- Multan Sultans won the toss and elected to bat.

Match 13
23 April 2025
20:00 (N)
Scorecard

(H) Multan Sultans; 168/5 (20 overs)	v	Islamabad United; 171/3 (17.1 overs)
Usman Khan 61 (40); Mohammad Nawaz 1/13 (2 overs)		Andries Gous 80* (45); Chris Jordan 1/24 (2 overs)

Islamabad United won by 7 wickets
Multan Cricket Stadium, Multan
Umpires: Chris Brown (NZ) and Ahsan Raza (Pak)
Player of the match: Andries Gous (Islamabad United)

- Multan Sultans won the toss and elected to bat.

Match 14
24 April 2025
20:00 (N)
Scorecard

(H) Lahore Qalandars; 129 (19.2 overs)	v	Peshawar Zalmi; 133/3 (16.4 overs)
Sikandar Raza 52 (37); Alzarri Joseph 3/16 (4 overs)		Babar Azam 56* (42); Shaheen Afridi 2/22 (4 overs)

Peshawar Zalmi won by 7 wickets
Gaddafi Stadium, Lahore
Umpires: Paul Reiffel (Aus) and Asif Yaqoob (Pak)
Player of the match: Alzarri Joseph (Peshawar Zalmi)

- Peshawar Zalmi won the toss and elected to field.

Match 15
25 April 2025
20:00 (N)
Scorecard

(H) Quetta Gladiators; 142 (19.3 overs)	v	Karachi Kings; 137/8 (20 overs)
Faheem Ashraf 43 (27); Hasan Ali 3/33 (3.3 overs)		Tim Seifert 47 (26); Mohammad Wasim Jr. 2/22 (4 overs)

Quetta Gladiators won by 5 runs
Gaddafi Stadium, Lahore
Umpires: Nasir Hussain (Pak) and Paul Reiffel (Aus)
Player of the match: Abrar Ahmed (Quetta Gladiators)

- Karachi Kings won the toss and elected to field.

Match 16
26 April 2025
20:00 (N)
Scorecard

Multan Sultans; 185/3 (20 overs)	v	Lahore Qalandars (H); 186/5 (19 overs)
Mohammad Rizwan 76* (48); Tom Curran 1/24 (4 overs)		Daryl Mitchell 64 (38); Ubaid Shah 2/34 (4 overs)

Lahore Qalandars won by 5 wickets
Gaddafi Stadium, Lahore
Umpires: Ahsan Raza (Pak) and Alex Wharf (Eng)
Player of the match: Daryl Mitchell (Lahore Qalandars)

- Lahore Qalandars won the toss and elected to field.

Match 17
27 April 2025
20:00 (N)
Scorecard

(H) Quetta Gladiators; 178/7 (20 overs)	v	Peshawar Zalmi; 114 (15.2 overs)
Mark Chapman 33 (26); Alzarri Joseph 3/33 (4 overs)		Hussain Talat 39 (34); Faheem Ashraf 5/33 (3.2 overs)

Quetta Gladiators won by 64 runs
Gaddafi Stadium, Lahore
Umpires: Rashid Riaz (Pak) and Alex Wharf (Eng)
Player of the match: Faheem Ashraf (Quetta Gladiators)

- Peshawar Zalmi won the toss and elected to field.

Match 18
29 April 2025
20:00 (N)
Scorecard

Multan Sultans; 89 (17 overs)	v	Quetta Gladiators (H); 90/0 (6.5 overs)
Mohammad Rizwan 44* (44); Khurram Shahzad 4/23 (4 overs)		Finn Allen 45* (21)

Quetta Gladiators won by 10 wickets
Gaddafi Stadium, Lahore
Umpires: Faisal Afridi (Pak) and Ahsan Raza (Pak)
Player of the match: Khurram Shahzad (Quetta Gladiators)

- Quetta Gladiators won the toss and elected to field.
- Mohammad Rizwan becomes the first player to carry the bat in PSL history.

Match 19
30 April 2025
20:00 (N)
Scorecard

(H) Lahore Qalandars; 209/6 (20 overs)	v	Islamabad United; 121 (16.5 overs)
Fakhar Zaman 44 (30); Imad Wasim 2/26 (3 overs)		Andries Gous 41 (27); Haris Rauf 4/31 (3.5 overs)

Lahore Qalandars won by 88 runs
Gaddafi Stadium, Lahore
Umpires: Paul Reiffel (Aus) and Asif Yaqoob (Pak)
Player of the match: Sikandar Raza (Lahore Qalandars)

- Islamabad United won the toss and elected to field.

Match 20
1 May 2025
15:00
Scorecard

Karachi Kings; 204/4 (20 overs)	v	Multan Sultans; 117 (16.1 overs)
James Vince 65* (45); Ubaid Shah 2/49 (4 overs)		Kamran Ghulam 29 (25); Mohammad Nabi 3/14 (4 overs)

Karachi Kings won by 87 runs
Gaddafi Stadium, Lahore
Umpires: Rashid Riaz (Pak) and Alex Wharf (Eng)
Player of the match: James Vince (Karachi Kings)

- Karachi Kings won the toss and elected to bat.
- This match was originally scheduled in Multan Cricket Stadium.
- As a result, Multan Sultans were eliminated from the playoff stage.

Match 21
1 May 2025
20:00 (N)
Scorecard

(H) Lahore Qalandars; 111/3 (11.3 overs)	v	Quetta Gladiators
Abdullah Shafique 53* (32); Abrar Ahmed 2/23 (2.3 overs)

No result
Gaddafi Stadium, Lahore
Umpires: Faisal Afridi (Pak) and Paul Reiffel (Aus)

- Quetta Gladiators won the toss and elected to field.
- No further play was possible due to rain.

Match 22
2 May 2025
20:00 (N)
Scorecard

Islamabad United; 143/9 (20 overs)	v	Peshawar Zalmi; 147/4 (16.4 overs)
Sahibzada Farhan 36 (35); Mohammad Ali 3/26 (4 overs)		Maaz Sadaqat 55 (33); Ben Dwarshuis 1/23 (3.4 overs)

Peshawar Zalmi won by 6 wickets
Gaddafi Stadium, Lahore
Umpires: Faisal Afridi (Pak) and Alex Wharf (Eng)
Player of the match: Maaz Sadaqat (Peshawar Zalmi)

- Islamabad United won the toss and elected to bat.

Match 23
3 May 2025
20:00 (N)
Scorecard

Islamabad United; 157/9 (20 overs)	v	(H) Quetta Gladiators; 159/8 (19.5 overs)
Mohammad Nawaz 49 (34); Faheem Ashraf 4/25 (3 overs)		Hassan Nawaz 64* (41); Naseem Shah 2/31 (4 overs); Salman Irshad 2/31 (4 overs)

Quetta Gladiators won by 2 wickets
Gaddafi Stadium, Lahore
Umpires: Rashid Riaz (Pak) and Alex Wharf (Eng)
Player of the match: Hassan Nawaz (Quetta Gladiators)

- Quetta Gladiators won the toss and elected to field.
- As a result, Quetta Gladiators qualified for the playoffs.

Match 24
4 May 2025
20:00 (N)
Scorecard

(H) Lahore Qalandars; 160/8 (15 overs)	v	Karachi Kings; 168/6 (14.3 overs)
Muhammad Naeem 65 (29); Abbas Afridi 4/27 (3 overs)		Irfan Khan Niazi 48* (21); Daryl Mitchell 2/9 (1.3 overs)

Karachi Kings won by 4 wickets (DLS method)
Gaddafi Stadium, Lahore
Umpires: Ahsan Raza (Pak) and Alex Wharf (Eng)
Player of the match: Irfan Khan Niazi (Karachi Kings)

- Karachi Kings won the toss and elected to field.
- The match was reduced to 15 overs per side due to rain.

Match 25
5 May 2025
20:00 (N)
Scorecard

(H) Multan Sultans; 108 (19.1 overs)	v	Peshawar Zalmi; 110/3 (13 overs)
Shai Hope 23 (21); Ahmed Daniyal 3/17 (4 overs)		Saim Ayub 49 (33); Shahid Aziz 3/17 (3 overs)

Peshawar Zalmi won by 7 wickets
Multan Cricket Stadium, Multan
Umpires: Abdul Muqeet (Pak) and Paul Reiffel (Aus)
Player of the match: Ahmed Daniyal (Peshawar Zalmi)

- Multan Sultans won the toss and elected to bat.

Match 26
7 May 2025
20:00 (N)
Scorecard

Quetta Gladiators; 263/3 (20 overs)	v	(H) Islamabad United; 154 (19.3 overs)
Rilee Rossouw 104 (46); Imad Wasim 1/42 (4 overs)		Imad Wasim 56 (41); Mohammad Amir 3/6 (2 overs)

Quetta Gladiators won by 109 runs
Rawalpindi Cricket Stadium, Rawalpindi
Umpires: Faisal Afridi (Pak) and Kumar Dharmasena (SL)
Player of the match: Rilee Rossouw (Quetta Gladiators)

- Islamabad United won the toss and elected to field.
- Rilee Rossouw and Hassan Nawaz (Quetta Gladiators) became the first pair to score centuries in the same innings in PSL history.
- This was the highest total scored by a team in PSL history.

Match 27
17 May 2025
19:30 (N)
Scorecard

Karachi Kings; 237/4 (20 overs)	v	Peshawar Zalmi; 214/5 (20 overs)
David Warner 86 (50); Luke Wood 2/19 (4 overs)		Babar Azam 94 (49); Abbas Afridi 2/48 (4 overs)

Karachi Kings won by 23 runs
Rawalpindi Cricket Stadium, Rawalpindi
Umpires: Ahsan Raza (Pak) and Asif Yaqoob (Pak)
Player of the match: David Warner (Karachi Kings)

- Peshawar Zalmi won the toss and elected to field.
- As a result, Karachi Kings and Islamabad United qualified for the playoffs.

Match 28
18 May 2025
15:00
Scorecard

Multan Sultans; 185/7 (20 overs)	v	Quetta Gladiators; 190/8 (20 overs)
Yasir Khan 45 (25); Usman Tariq 3/32 (4 overs)		Hassan Nawaz 67* (38); Shahid Aziz 3/29 (4 overs)

Quetta Gladiators won by 2 wickets
Rawalpindi Cricket Stadium, Rawalpindi
Umpires: Faisal Afridi (Pak) and Asif Yaqoob (Pak)
Player of the match: Hassan Nawaz (Quetta Gladiators)

- Multan Sultans won the toss and elected to bat.
- This match was originally scheduled in Multan Cricket Stadium.

Match 29
18 May 2025
20:00 (N)
Scorecard

Lahore Qalandars; 149/8 (13 overs)	v	Peshawar Zalmi; 123/8 (13 overs)
Fakhar Zaman 60 (36); Ahmed Daniyal 2/22 (3 overs)		Daniel Sams 26* (14); Salman Mirza 4/31 (3 overs)

Lahore Qalandars won by 26 runs
Rawalpindi Cricket Stadium, Rawalpindi
Umpires: Ahsan Raza (Pak) and Rashid Riaz (Pak)
Player of the match: Salman Mirza (Lahore Qalandars)

- Peshawar Zalmi won the toss and elected to field.
- The match was reduced to 13 overs per side due to rain.
- By this match, Babar Azam became first player to have hundredth PSL match appearance.
- As a result, Lahore Qalandars qualified for the playoffs, and Peshawar Zalmi were eliminated from the playoff stage.

Match 30
19 May 2025
19:30 (N)
Scorecard

(H) Islamabad United; 251/5 (20 overs)	v	Karachi Kings; 172 (18.2 overs)
Alex Hales 88 (35); Mir Hamza 1/41 (4 overs)		David Warner 43 (28); Shadab Khan 4/45 (4 overs)

Islamabad United won by 79 runs
Rawalpindi Cricket Stadium, Rawalpindi
Umpires: Faisal Afridi (Pak) and Rashid Riaz (Pak)
Player of the match: Alex Hales (Islamabad United)

- Karachi Kings won the toss and elected to field.

== Playoffs ==
Qualifier
21 May – Gaddafi Stadium
1	Quetta Gladiators	209/6 (20 overs)
2	Islamabad United	179 (19.4 overs)
Eliminator 1
22 May – Gaddafi Stadium
3	Karachi Kings	190/8 (20 overs)
4	Lahore Qalandars	191/4 (18.4 overs)

Eliminator 2
23 May – Gaddafi Stadium
QL	Islamabad United	107 (15.1 overs)
E1W	Lahore Qalandars	202/8 (20 overs)

Final
25 May – Gaddafi Stadium
QW	Quetta Gladiators	201/9 (20 overs)
E2W	Lahore Qalandars	204/4 (19.5 overs)

=== Qualifier ===
Qualifier
21 May 2025
19:30 (N)
Scorecard

Quetta Gladiators; 209/6 (20 overs)	v	Islamabad United; 179 (19.4 overs)
Dinesh Chandimal 48* (28); Ben Dwarshuis 2/31 (2 overs)		Sahibzada Farhan 52 (35); Usman Tariq 3/32 (4 overs)

Quetta Gladiators won by 30 runs
Gaddafi Stadium, Lahore
Umpires: Aleem Dar (Pak) and Asif Yaqoob (Pak)
Player of the match: Faheem Ashraf (Quetta Gladiators)

- Quetta Gladiators won the toss and elected to bat.
- This match was originally scheduled in Rawalpindi Cricket Stadium.

=== Eliminator 1 ===
Eliminator 1
22 May 2025
19:30 (N)
Scorecard

Karachi Kings; 190/8 (20 overs)	v	Lahore Qalandars; 191/4 (18.4 overs)
David Warner 75 (52); Haris Rauf 3/35 (4 overs)		Abdullah Shafique 65 (35); Hasan Ali 2/37 (4 overs)

Lahore Qalandars won by 6 wickets
Gaddafi Stadium, Lahore
Umpires: Faisal Afridi (Pak) and Rashid Riaz (Pak)
Player of the match: Abdullah Shafique (Lahore Qalandars)

- Karachi Kings won the toss and elected to bat.

=== Eliminator 2 ===
Eliminator 2
23 May 2025
19:30 (N)
Scorecard

Lahore Qalandars; 202/8 (20 overs)	v	Islamabad United; 107 (15.1 overs)
Kusal Perera 61 (35); Tymal Mills 3/42 (4 overs)		Salman Ali Agha 33 (26); Shaheen Afridi 3/3 (3.1 overs)

Lahore Qalandars won by 95 runs
Gaddafi Stadium, Lahore
Umpires: Faisal Afridi (Pak) and Asif Yaqoob (Pak)
Player of the match: Salman Mirza (Lahore Qalandars)

- Lahore Qalandars won the toss and elected to bat.

=== Final ===
Final
25 May 2025
19:30 (N)
Scorecard

Quetta Gladiators; 201/9 (20 overs)	v	Lahore Qalandars; 204/4 (19.5 overs)
Hassan Nawaz 76 (43); Shaheen Afridi 3/24 (4 overs)		Kusal Perera 62* (31); Abrar Ahmed 1/27 (4 overs)

Lahore Qalandars won by 6 wickets
Gaddafi Stadium, Lahore
Umpires: Rashid Riaz (Pak) and Asif Yaqoob (Pak)
Player of the match: Kusal Perera (Lahore Qalandars)

- Quetta Gladiators won the toss and elected to bat.
- This final broke the record for the highest successful run chase in a PSL final by Lahore Qalandars—surpassing the previous record of 175 by Islamabad United in the 2016 final. This match also had one of the highest combined scores (405) in PSL final history.

== Awards and statistics ==
=== Trophy ===
The 'Luminara Trophy' was unveiled on 13 March 2025. Weighing 10 kg, it has 22,850 high-lustre zircon stones on it. The trophy had a first-ever nation-wide tour prior to the tournament. The winning team was awarded with US$500,000, while the runner-up team received US$200,000 as a prize money. (Note: On 26 May 2025, US$1 was equivalent to Rs. 282.0240.)

=== Most runs ===
Player	Team	Inns	Runs	HS	Ave
Sahibzada Farhan	Islamabad United	12	449	106	37.41
Fakhar Zaman	Lahore Qalandars	13	439	76	33.76
Hassan Nawaz	Quetta Gladiators	10	399	100*	57.00
Abdullah Shafique	Lahore Qalandars	13	390	66	32.50
James Vince	Karachi Kings	11	378	101	37.80

- Source: ESPNcricinfo

=== Most wickets ===
Player	Team	Inns	Wkts	BBI	Ave
Shaheen Afridi	Lahore Qalandars	12	19	3/3	16.42
Abrar Ahmed	Quetta Gladiators	12	17	4/42	19.23
Hasan Ali	Karachi Kings	10	17	4/28	20.47
Faheem Ashraf	Quetta Gladiators	12	17	5/33	20.52
Abbas Afridi	Karachi Kings	11	17	4/27	23.52

- Source: ESPNcricinfo

=== End of season awards ===
Name	Team	Award
Hassan Nawaz	Quetta Gladiators	Player of the Tournament
Hassan Nawaz	Quetta Gladiators	Batsman of the tournament
Shaheen Afridi	Lahore Qalandars	Bowler of the tournament
Sikandar Raza	Lahore Qalandars	All-rounder of the tournament
Mohammad Haris	Peshawar Zalmi	Wicket-keeper of the tournament
Abdul Samad	Peshawar Zalmi	Fielder of the tournament
Muhammad Naeem	Lahore Qalandars	Emerging player of the tournament
Asif Yaqoob	—N/a	Umpire of the tournament
—N/a	Peshawar Zalmi	Spirit of cricket

=== Team of the tournament ===
Name	Team	Role
Fakhar Zaman	Lahore Qalandars	Batter
Sahibzada Farhan	Islamabad United	Wicket-keeper
David Warner	Karachi Kings	Batter
James Vince	Karachi Kings	Batter
Hassan Nawaz	Quetta Gladiators	Batter
Sikandar Raza	Lahore Qalandars	All-rounder
Faheem Ashraf	Quetta Gladiators	All-rounder
Shaheen Afridi	Lahore Qalandars	Bowler(Captain)
Hassan Ali	Karachi Kings	Bowler
Ali Raza	Peshawar Zalmi	Bowler
Abrar Ahmed	Quetta Gladiators	Bowler
Khushdil Shah	Karachi Kings	12th Man

- Source: PCB
