= Champions T20 Cup =

Twenty20 cricket competition in Pakistan

- Countries: Pakistan
- Administrator: Pakistan Cricket Board
- Format: Twenty20
- First edition: 2024–25
- Next edition: 2025-26
- Number of teams: 5
- Current champion: Stallions (1st title)
- Most runs: Hussain Talat (319)
- Most wickets: Mohammad Ali (22)
- TV: List of Broadcasters
- Website: championscup.pk

The Champions T20 Cup, is a men's professional domestic Twenty20 cricket competition in Pakistan. It's organized by the Pakistan Cricket Board and was first contested during the 2024 season.

== History ==
In June 2024, Pakistan Cricket Board introduces a new domestic Twenty20 Cricket event, called Champions T20 Cup. that forms part of the Pakistan domestic cricket season. The league was aimed to make up for the absence of high-profile matches in Pakistan every year and to expose talented players from Country.

== Team ==
Team	Captain	Coach	Debut	Titles
Dolphins	Saud Shakeel	Iqbal Imam	2024	
Lions	Shaheen Afridi	Abdur Rehman	2024	
Panthers	Shadab Khan	Umar Rasheed	2024	
Stallions	Mohammad Haris Babar Azam	Mansoor Amjad	2024	1 (2024–25)
Markhors	Mohammad Rizwan	Ijaz Ahmed	2024	

== Tournament final ==
Season	Final			Final venue	Player of the season
Season	Winner	Result	Runner-up	Final venue	Player of the season
2024–25	Stallions; 199/5 (20 overs)	Stallions won by 75 runs Scorecard	Markhors; 124 (19.1 overs)	Rawalpindi Cricket Stadium, Rawalpindi	Mohammad Ali (Stallions)

== Broadcasters ==
Territory	Channels & Live Streaming
Pakistan	PTV Sports; A Sports; Geo Super; Ten Sports
Rest Of The World	Facebook YouTube

== See also ==
- Champions One-Day Cup
- Champions Pentagular
