= Champions Pentagular =

First-class cricket tournament in Pakistan

- Countries: Pakistan
- Administrator: Pakistan Cricket Board
- Format: First-class
- First edition: 2024–25
- Next edition: 2025-26
- Number of teams: 5
- Website: www.pcb.com.pk

The Champions Pentagular is a domestic first-class cricket competition in Pakistan. between the five champions teams organized by the Pakistan Cricket Board (PCB) that forms part of the Pakistan domestic cricket season.The tournament schedule to feature the country's 150 best of the best cricketers. The first edition of tournament scheduled to be held in 2024–25 season.

== History ==
In August 2024, Pakistan Cricket Board (PCB) has introduced three new competitions namely The Champions One-Day Cup, Champions T20 Cup and Champions First-Class Cup as a part of the 2024-25 domestic season to provide a tougher, more competitive and high-pressure cricket playing environment in the country.

== Teams ==
Team	Captain	Coach	Debut	Titles
Dolphins	Saud Shakeel	Iqbal Imam	2024	
Lions	Shaheen Afridi	Abdur Rehman	2024	
Panthers	Shadab Khan	Umar Rasheed	2024	
Stallions	Babar Azam	Mansoor Amjad	2024	
Markhors	Mohammad Rizwan	Ijaz Ahmed	2024	

== Tournament final ==
Season	Final			Final venue	Player of the season
Season	Winner	Result	Runner-up	Final venue	Player of the season
2025–26				Faisalabad	

== See also ==
- Champions T20 Cup
- Champions One-Day Cup
