= Ali Raza (cricketer, born 2008) =

Pakistani cricketer (born 2008)

Personal information
- Born: 18 March 2008 (age 18); Nankana Sahib, Punjab, Pakistan
- Batting: Right-handed
- Bowling: Right-arm fast
- Role: Bowler

Domestic team information
- Years: Team
- 2024–present: Sialkot
- 2025–present: Peshawar Zalmi

Career statistics
Competition	FC	LA	T20
Matches	8	15	20
Runs scored	7	4	1
Batting average	1.16	2.00	–
100s/50s	0/0	0/0	0/0
Top score	6	2	1*
Balls bowled	1,501	581	409
Wickets	34	18	26
Bowling average	24.38	33.61	23.73
5 wickets in innings	2	0	0
10 wickets in match	1	0	0
Best bowling	10/110	3/56	4/21
Catches/stumpings	2/–	2/–	5/–
Medal record
Men's cricket
Representing Pakistan
Asian Games
Silver medal – second place	2026 Aichi–Nagoya
U19 Asia Cup
Winner	2025 UAE
Runner-up	2026 Oman
- Source: Cricinfo, 14 November 2026

Ali Raza (born 18 March 2008) is a Pakistani cricketer who plays as a right-arm fast bowler. He represents Sialkot in domestic cricket and Peshawar Zalmi in the Pakistan Super League.

== Early life ==
Raza hails from the city of Nankana Sahib in Punjab, Pakistan. As a pre-teen and teenager he underwent training at the Rana Naveed Cricket Academy.

== Youth career ==
In the 2024 Under-19 World Cup semi-final, 15-year-old Raza took 4 wickets for 34 against Australia and nearly guided Pakistan to victory. The spell marked him out as a future fast-bowling prospect for Pakistan.

On 21 December 2025, in the final of the 2025 ACC Under-19 Asia Cup against India U-19, which Pakistan U-19 won, Raza took 4/42 in 6.2 overs.

On 14 November 2026, in the final of the 2026 ACC Under-19 Asia Cup against India U-19, which Pakistan U-19 lost, Raza took 1/65 in 10 overs.

== Domestic career ==
Raza made his List A debut for Water and Power Development Authority on 24 April 2024, against Khan Research Laboratories in the 2024 President's Cup. He made his first-class debut for Sialkot on 26 October 2024, against Federally Administered Tribal Areas in the 2024–25 Quaid-e-Azam Trophy. He made his Twenty20 debut for Panthers on 8 December 2024, against Dolphins in the 2024–25 Champions T20 Cup.

== Franchise career ==
=== Pakistan Super League ===
Raza was drafted by Peshawar Zalmi in the emerging category for 2025 Pakistan Super League season. On April 19, he took four wickets against Multan Sultans. Zalmi won by 120 runs, which was the biggest margin of win by runs in the PSL, and Raza's spell of 4/21 was instrumental in Sultans' defeat. Clocking speeds in the high 140s km/h, Raza got rid of Sultans' middle-order while his accuracy at the death while his well-executed yorkers were also noted.

In April 2026, during the 2026 PSL, he took a hat-trick for Peshawar Zalmi against Karachi Kings, becoming at 18 the youngest Pakistani to claim a hat-trick.

=== Bangladesh Premier League ===
In December 2024, he was signed by Chittagong Kings to play for them in the 2025 Bangladesh Premier League.

=== Other leagues ===
In October 2025, Raza was among a wave of Pakistani cricketers selected for the 2025 Abu Dhabi T10 League. He joined the squad of Deccan Gladiators.
