= Champions One-Day Cup =

Pakistan cricket competition

- Countries: Pakistan
- Administrator: Pakistan Cricket Board
- Format: Limited overs (List A)
- First edition: 2024–25
- Latest edition: 2026
- Number of teams: 5
- Current champion: Pakistan Gold (1st title)
- Most successful: Panthers; Pakistan Gold (1 title each)
- Website: championscup.pk

The Champions One-Day Cup is a limited-overs List A tournament in Pakistan between five teams, organized by the Pakistan Cricket Board (PCB) that forms part of the Pakistan domestic cricket season. The first edition of tournament held in 2024 in Iqbal Stadium in Faisalabad.

== History ==
In August 2024, Pakistan Cricket Board (PCB) introduced three new competitions namely The Champions One-Day Cup, Champions T20 Cup and Champions First-Class Cup as part of the 2024-25 domestic season to provide a tougher, more competitive and high-pressure cricket playing environment in the country.

== Format ==
The tournament is scheduled to be played in a round-robin format, with top four teams qualifying for the play-offs. The following teams are scheduled to participate in the tournament.

== Team ==
| Team | Captain | Coach | Debut | Titles |
|---|---|---|---|---|
| Dolphins | Saud Shakeel | Iqbal Imam | 2024 | |
| Lions | Shaheen Afridi | Abdur Rehman | 2024 | |
| Panthers | Shadab Khan | Umar Rasheed | 2024 | 1 (2024) |
| Stallions | Babar Azam Mohammad Haris | Mansoor Amjad | 2024 | |
| Markhors | Mohammad Rizwan | Ijaz Ahmed | 2024 | |

== Tournament final ==
| Season | Final | | | Final venue | Player of the season |
| Season | Winner | Result | Runner-up | Final venue | Player of the season |
|---|---|---|---|---|---|
| 2024–25 | Panthers; 123/5 (18 overs) | Panthers won by 5 wickets (Scorecard) | Markhors; 122 (33.4 overs) | Iqbal Stadium, Faisalabad | Mohammad Hasnain (Panthers) |
| 2026 | Pakistan Gold; 340 (50 overs) | Pakistan Gold won by 101 runs (Scorecard) | Pakistan Greens; 239 (37.3 overs) | Multan Cricket Stadium, Multan | Fakhar Zaman (Pakistan Greens) |

== Media ==
=== Team Media Partners ===
- Stallions – ARY News
- Panthers – Dunya News
- Dolphins – Geo News
- Markhors – Hum News
- Lions – Samaa TV
  - Source:

=== Broadcasters ===
| TV Channels Broadcasting | Online Streaming Platforms |
Pakistan
| PTV Sports | Tamasha |
| A Sports | Tapmad |
| Geo Super; Ten Sports | Myco |
North America
Willow TV

== Prize Money ==
- Winners: PKR 30 million
- Runners-up: PKR 15 million
- Source

== Sponsorship ==
| Title sponsor | Period |
|---|---|
| Bahria Town | 2024 |

=== Other Sponsors ===
- Blue World City
- Inverex Solar Energy
- Brighto Paints
- Kingdom Valley

== See also ==
- Champions T20 Cup
- Champions Pentagular
- Quaid-e-Azam Trophy
- National T20 Cup
- Pakistan Super League
