= Irfan Khan Niazi =

Pakistani cricketer (born 2002)

Personal information
- Full name: Mohammad Irfan Khan Niazi
- Born: 28 December 2002 (age 23); Mianwali, Punjab, Pakistan
- Batting: Right-handed
- Bowling: Right-arm medium fast

International information
- National side: Pakistan (2024–present)
- ODI debut (cap 244): 4 November 2024 v Australia
- Last ODI: 29 March 2025 v New Zealand
- ODI shirt no.: 80
- T20I debut (cap 115): 18 April 2024 v New Zealand
- Last T20I: 23 March 2025 v New Zealand
- T20I shirt no.: 80

Domestic team information
- Years: Team
- 2019/20–2020/21: Central Punjab
- 2023–2025: Karachi Kings
- 2026: Hyderabad Kingsmen (squad no. 75)

Career statistics
Competition	ODI	T20I	FC	LA
Matches	9	14	17	33
Runs scored	48	189	957	571
Batting average	8.00	27.00	45.57	24.82
100s/50s	0/0	0/0	1/6	1/3
Top score	22	37*	101*	100*
Balls bowled	30	0	66	30
Wickets	3	0	0	3
Bowling average	17.00	–	–	17.00
5 wickets in innings	0	0	0	0
10 wickets in match	0	0	0	0
Best bowling	3/51	–	–	3/51
Catches/stumpings	5/–	8/–	22/–	22/–
- Source: Cricinfo, 26 April 2025

Mohammad Irfan Khan Niazi (born 28 December 2002) is a Pakistani cricketer.

== Early career ==
Born in Mianwali, Punjab, Irfan switched from tape-ball to hard-ball cricket in 2015 by joining the city's Ikram Shaheed Cricket Club, while after club cricket he played Under-19 cricket, at district level with Mianwali in 2016 and at regional level with Faisalabad in 2017.

Due to his performances, he was eventually named in Pakistan's squad for the 2020 Under-19 Cricket World Cup.

== Domestic and franchise career ==
In September 2019, he was named in the newly formed Central Punjab for the 2019–20 domestic season. He was retained by Central Punjab for the 2020–21 domestic season.

In February 2020, Irfan made his List A debut for Pakistan Shaheens against the Marylebone Cricket Club (MCC), during the MCC's tour of Pakistan.

In September 2020, he made his Twenty20 debut for Central Punjab in the 2020–21 National T20 Cup.

In December 2021, he was named in Pakistan's team for the 2022 ICC Under-19 Cricket World Cup in the West Indies.

In September 2024, in the Champions One-Day Cup match at Faisalabad, Irfan Khan was Player of the Match for a blistering 100 off 56 balls*, powering Lions to 367/6. His late-overs acceleration broke the game open and ended table-toppers Markhors’ unbeaten run.

In May 2025, during PSL 2025, Irfan Khan was Player of the Match for a decisive 48* that finished the chase for Karachi Kings against Lahore Qalandars, following their score of 160/8 in a rain-shortened game (15 overs per side.)

== International career ==
Due to his good performance in the 2024 Pakistan Super League, he was called up to Pakistan's T20I squad for Pakistan's 5-match home T20I series against New Zealand. He made his international and T20I debut in the first match, but did not bat due to the match being abandoned because of rain. He was called up to Pakistan's ODI squad for Pakistan's 3-match ODI series against Australia, and made his ODI debut in the first match, scoring 22 runs.
