= Waqar Ahmed (cricketer, born 2000) =

Pakistani cricketer (born 2000)

Personal information
- Full name: Waqar Ahmed
- Born: 1 January 2000 (age 26); Peshawar, Khyber Pakhtunkhwa, Pakistan
- Batting: Right-handed
- Bowling: Right-arm medium
- Role: Batter

Domestic team information
- Years: Team
- 2018/19–2025/26: Peshawar
- 2021/22–2022/23: Khyber Pakhtunkhwa
- 2023/24–2025/26: Khan Research Laboratories

Career statistics
Competition	First-class	List A	Twenty20
Matches	46	31	9
Runs scored	2,844	822	197
Batting average	36.46	28.34	24.62
100s/50s	7/14	0/8	0/1
Top score	246	94	55
Balls bowled	132	3	–
Wickets	2	0	–
Bowling average	30.50	–	–
5 wickets in innings	0	0	0
10 wickets in match	0	0	0
Best bowling	2/12	0/2	–
Catches/stumpings	47/–	11/–	3/–
- Source: Cricinfo, 29 April 2026

Waqar Ahmed (born 1 January 2000) is a Pakistani cricketer. Ahmed is a right-handed batsman who bowls right-arm medium. He was born in Peshawar, Khyber Pakhtunkhwa.

Ahmed made his first-class debut for Peshawar against Habib Bank in the 2018–19 Quaid-e-Azam Trophy. He later made his List A debut for Khyber Pakhtunkhwa against Central Punjab in the 2021–22 Pakistan Cup, and made his Twenty20 debut in the 2024–25 Champions T20 Cup for Dolphins against UMT Markhors.

He has represented Peshawar, Khyber Pakhtunkhwa and Khan Research Laboratories in Pakistani domestic cricket. Ahmed also played Youth One Day International cricket for Pakistan Under-19s. In the 2018 ACC Under-19 Asia Cup, he scored 67 against Bangladesh Under-19s.

At the start of the 2024–25 Quaid-e-Azam Trophy, Ahmed scored 140 against Karachi Whites in a 217-run opening partnership with Sahibzada Farhan. Later that season, playing for Khan Research Laboratories in the 2024–25 President's Trophy Grade-I, he made a career-best 246 against Pakistan Television.
