= Saad Masood =

Pakistani cricketer (born 2004)

Personal information
- Born: 10 December 2004 (age 21); Rawalpindi, Punjab, Pakistan
- Batting: Right-handed
- Bowling: Right-arm leg spin
- Role: All-rounder
- Relatives: Umair Masood (brother)

International information
- National side: Pakistan (2026-present)
- Only ODI (cap 260): 15 March 2026 v Bangladesh
- ODI shirt no.: 45

Domestic team information
- Years: Team
- 2023: Peshawar Zalmi
- 2024: SNGPL
- 2024: UMT Markhors
- 2025: Islamabad United
- 2026: Multan Sultans
- 2026: Rawalpindiz

Career statistics
Competition	List A	T20
Matches	2	17
Runs scored	56	179
Batting average	56.00	22.37
100s/50s	0/0	0/1
Top score	44*	63*
Balls bowled	102	227
Wickets	1	9
Bowling average	87.00	36.77
5 wickets in innings	0	0
10 wickets in match	0	0
Best bowling	1/54	2/20
Catches/stumpings	1/–	8/–
Medal record
Representing Pakistan
Asian Games
Silver medal – second place	2026 Aichi–Nagoya	Team
- Source: ESPNcricinfo, 21 October 2025

Saad Masood (Note: Urdu: سعد مسعود) (born 10 December 2004) is a Pakistani cricketer.

== Early career ==
Saad hails from Rawalpindi, and his interest in cricket developed by watching his elder brother, Umair Masood, who is a first-class cricketer and former Pakistan U19 player. His family provided strong support, including his brother acting as a support system during challenging phases.

He took part in age-group cricket for his region: in 2018, he played in the U13 Inter-Regional T20 Tournament for Rawalpindi, taking 12 wickets and scoring 118 runs in six matches in the 2020-21 National U16 One-Day tournament for Northern.

== Youth career ==
In October 2022, Saad made headlines in the Pakistan Junior League (PJL) when playing for the Gwadar Sharks. He bowled only 15 balls and took a five-for (5 wickets for 6 runs), the first such performance in the PJL’s history, triggering a dramatic collapse of the opposition.

== Domestic and franchise career ==
Masood made his Twenty20 debut on 26 February 2023, for Peshawar Zalmi in the 2023 Pakistan Super League. He made his List A debut for Sui Northern Gas Pipelines Limited in the 2024–25 President's Cup on 12 October 2024. Masood was also named in UMT Markhors's squad for the 2024–25 Champions T20 Cup tournament. On 13 January 2025, Masood was picked from the 2025 Pakistan Super League players draft for Islamabad United.

Playing for Pakistan Shaheen against Sri Lanka A in the semi-final of the 2025 Asia Cup Rising Stars, Saad Masood made a vital contribution with the bat when Pakistan Shaheens were in real trouble, coming in during a collapse that had stalled the innings and shifted momentum firmly toward Sri Lanka A; despite the difficult situation, he showed maturity and composure, scoring a steady 22 off 25 balls, rotating the strike, breaking the pressure of dot balls, and helping rebuild the innings toward what eventually became a defendable total of 153/9, a score the Shaheens protected by just five runs. His knock, combined with his 3/18 with the ball, proved decisive in the narrow semifinal win and he was declared Player of the Match.

== International career ==
In June 2026, he was named in the 15-member men's squad announced for the 2026 Asian Games. On 3 October 2026, he made his Twenty20 International debut as Pakistan won the silver medal after losing in the Asian Games men’s cricket final against India at the Kōrogi Athletic Park in Nisshin, Japan.

== Playing style ==
Saad Masood is an all-rounder, primarily a batsman who also bowls leg-spin, who has been compared to Shadab Khan. Saad only shifted to bowling leg-spin after previously being an off-spinner, following advice from coach and former Pakistan international cricketer Mushtaq Ahmed, who was known as a leg-spinner.
