= Dolphins (Pakistani cricket team) =

Pakistani first-class cricket team

Personnel
- Captain: Saud Shakeel
- Coach: Wahab Riaz
- Manager: Ahmed Raza

Team information
- Founded: 2024; 1 year ago
- Home ground: TBA

History
- Champions Pentagular wins: -
- Champions One-Day Cup wins: -
- Champions T20 Cup wins: -
First-class
One-day
T20

The Dolphins Cricket Team (known as Engro Dolphins for sponsorship reasons) are one of five Pakistan cricket teams that make up Pakistan Cricket Board.

It competes in the Champions Pentagular first class (4-day) competition, Champions One-Day Cup domestic one day competition and the Champions T20 Cup Twenty20 competition.

== History ==
In August 2024, Pakistan Cricket Board (PCB) introduced three new competitions namely The Champions One-Day Cup, Champions T20 Cup and Champions First-Class Cup as part of the 2024-25 domestic season to provide a tougher, more competitive and high-pressure cricket playing environment in the country. Dolphins Captain Is Saud Shakeel And Vice Captain Is Rana Faheem Ashraf

== Current squads ==
| No. | Name | Nat | Birth date | Batting style | Bowling style | Notes |
Batters
All-rounders
Wicket-keepers
Bowlers

== Coaching staff ==
| Position | Name |
|---|---|
| Head coach | Iqbal Imam |
| Mentor | Sarfaraz Ahmed |
| Fielding coach | Abdul Saad |
| Team Manager | Ahmed Raza |
| Batting Coach | Mohammad Masroor |
| Fast Bowling Coach | Sajid Shah |
| Spin Bowling Coach | Tahir Mahmood |
| Strength and Conditioning Coach | Taimoor Mahmood |
| Masseur | Faisal Raza |
| Analyst | Hafiz Ali Hamza |
| Physiotherapist | Imtiaz |

== Honours ==
- Champions Pentagular
  - -
- Champions One-Day Cup
  - -
- Champions T20 Cup
  - -

== Sponsorship ==
- Team Sponsors - AirSial
- Team Media Partners - Geo News
