= Stallions cricket team (Pakistan) =

Pakistani first-class cricket team

Stallions
Personnel
- Captain: Mohammad Haris
- Coach: Mansoor Amjad
- Batting coach: Shahzaib Hasan
- Manager: Mohammad Ali Shahzad

Team information
- Colors: Orange
- Founded: 2024; 2 years ago
- Home ground: TBA

History
- Champions Pentagular wins: -
- Champions One-Day Cup wins: -
- Champions T20 Cup wins: 1
First-class
One-day
T20

The Stallions Cricket Team (also known as for sponsorship reasons as Allied Bank Stallions) are one of five Pakistan cricket teams that make up Pakistan Cricket Board. Mohammad Haris As Captain And Babar Azam As Vice Captain Other Player Like Shan Masood Mohammad Ali

It competes in the Champions Pentagular first class (4-day) competition, Champions One-Day Cup domestic one day competition and the Champions T20 Cup Twenty20 competition.

== History ==
In August 2024,Stallions cricket Team Offer Captaincy To Babar Azam But Babar Azam Decline Captaincy Offer Pakistan Cricket Board (PCB) introduced three new competitions namely The Champions One-Day Cup, Champions T20 Cup and Champions First-Class Cup as part of the 2024-25 domestic season to provide a tougher, more competitive and high-pressure cricket playing environment in the country.

== Current squads ==
No.	Name	Nat	Birth date	Batting style	Bowling style	Notes
Batters
56	Babar Azam	Pakistan	15 October 1994 (age 31)	Right-handed	Right-arm off break	Vice-Captain
All-rounders
23	Hussain Talat	Pakistan	12 February 1996 (age 30)	Left-handed	Right-arm medium-fast	
Wicket-keepers
29	Mohammad Haris	Pakistan	30 March 2001 (age 25)	Right-handed	Right-arm off break	Captain
23	Azam Khan	Pakistan	10 August 1998 (age 27)	Right-handed	—	
Bowlers
40	Abrar Ahmed	Pakistan	16 October 1998 (age 27)	Right-handed	Right-arm leg break	
97	Haris Rauf	Pakistan	7 November 1993 (age 32)	Right-handed	Right-arm fast	

== Coaching staff ==
Position	Name
Head coach	Ebrahim Khurram Baig
Mentor	Hussain Turab
Fielding coach	Sabtain
Team Manager	Wahab Bhai
Batting Coach	Faisal Naveed
Fast Bowling Coach	Zulkifal Khurram Baig
Spin Bowling Coach	Abdur Rehman
Strength and Conditioning Coach	Bilal Munir
Masseur	Mohammad Mustaqeem
Analyst	Mohammad Ahsan Ehsan
Physiotherapist	Tanvir

== Honours ==
- Champions Pentagular
  - -
- Champions One-Day Cup
  - -
- Champions T20 Cup
  - -

== Sponsorship ==
- Team Sponsors - Allied Bank
- Team Media Partners - ARY Digital Network
