= Yasir Khan =

Pakistani cricketer (born 2002)

Personal information
- Born: 13 April 2002 (age 24); Bannu, Khyber Pakhtunkhwa, Pakistan
- Batting: Right-handed
- Role: Batsman

Domestic team information
- Years: Team
- 2021-2022: Peshawar Zalmi (squad no. 17)
- 2023: Quetta Gladiators (squad no. 17)
- 2024–2025: Multan Sultans (squad no. 19 previously 18)
- 2024–present: Stallions
- 2026: Rawalpindiz (squad no. 19)

Career statistics
Competition	First-class	List A	Twenty20
Matches	11	16	65
Runs scored	628	308	1,594
Batting average	29.90	19.25	26.56
100s/50s	1/4	0/2	2/8
Top score	185	60	107
Balls bowled	42	–	–
Wickets	1	–	–
Bowling average	47.00	–	–
5 wickets in innings	0	–	–
10 wickets in match	0	–	–
Best bowling	1/22	–	–
Catches/stumpings	8/–	4/–	19/–
- Source: Cricinfo, 13 September 2024

Yasir Khan (born 13 April 2002) is a Pakistani cricketer who plays for Rawalpindiz. Khan is a right-handed top-order batter. He was born in Bannu, Khyber Pakhtunkhwa, and spent much of his early cricketing development in Rawalpindi.

== Early life ==
Khan was born in Bannu in 2002. He spent his early life in Rawalpindi, where he played cricket for five years before joining grade-2 cricket for KP 2nd XI.

== Career ==
Khan made his Twenty20 debut for Peshawar Zalmi against Quetta Gladiators in the 2021 Pakistan Super League. He made his List A debut for Khyber Pakhtunkhwa against Northern in the 2021–22 Pakistan Cup, and his first-class debut for Rawalpindi against Karachi Whites in the 2024–25 Quaid-e-Azam Trophy. He later played senior cricket for Rawalpindi, Abbottabad, Pakistan Television, Multan Sultans, Rawalpindiz and Pakistan Shaheens.

Khan's maiden senior century came in December 2023, when he scored 107 from 59 balls for Rawalpindi against Federally Administered Tribal Areas in the 2023–24 National T20 Cup. He shared a 154-run partnership with Umar Amin as Rawalpindi won by seven wickets.

His second T20 century came in December 2024, when he made 100 for Stallions against Markhors in the final of the 2024–25 Champions T20 Cup. Stallions made 199 for 5 and won the final by 75 runs.

Khan scored his maiden first-class century in October 2025, when he made 185 for Abbottabad against Islamabad in the 2025–26 Quaid-e-Azam Trophy. After finishing the opening day unbeaten on 173, he went on to top-score in Abbottabad's first-innings 437 and helped his side to a 70-run victory.
