= Iqbal Imam =

Pakistani cricketer (born 1969)

Personal information
- Born: 17 July 1969 (age 57)
- Batting: Left-handed
- Bowling: Right arm off-break
- Source: Cricinfo, 8 April 2019

Iqbal Imam (born 17 July 1969) is a Pakistani former cricketer. He played in 147 first-class and 115 List A matches between 1989 and 2005. In April 2019, he was appointed as the batting coach of the Pakistan women's cricket team, ahead of their tour to South Africa.
