= Lions cricket team (Pakistan) =

Pakistani first-class cricket team

Lions
Personnel
- Captain: Shaheen Afridi
- Coach: Sharjeel Khan
- Manager: Rahat Abbas Asadi

Team information
- Colors: -
- Founded: 2024; 2 years ago
- Home ground: TBA

History
- Champions Pentagular wins: -
- Champions One-Day Cup wins: -
- Champions T20 Cup wins: -
First-class
One-day
T20

The Lions Cricket Team (also known as for sponsorship reasons as Nurpur Lions) are one of five Pakistan cricket teams that make up Pakistan Cricket Board.

It competes in the Champions Pentagular first class (4-day) competition, Champions One-Day Cup domestic one day competition and the Champions T20 Cup Twenty20 competition.

== History ==
In August 2024, Pakistan Cricket Board (PCB) introduced three new competitions namely The Champions One-Day Cup, Champions T20 Cup and Champions First-Class Cup as part of the 2024-25 domestic season to provide a tougher, more competitive and high-pressure cricket playing environment in the country.

== Current squads ==
No.	Name	Nat	Birth date	Batting style	Bowling style	Notes
Batters
All-rounders
Wicket-keepers
Bowlers

== Coaching staff ==
Position	Name
Head coach	
Mentor	
Fielding coach	
Team Manager	
Batting Coach	
Fast Bowling Coach	
Spin Bowling Coach	
Strength and Conditioning Coach	
Masseur	
Analyst	
Physiotherapist	

== Honours ==
- Champions Pentagular
  - -
- Champions One-Day Cup
  - -
- Champions T20 Cup
  - -

== Sponsorship ==
- Team Sponsors - Nurpur
- Team Media Partners - Samaa TV
