= Hussain Talat =

Pakistani cricketer

Personal information
- Full name: Mohammad Hussain Talat
- Born: 12 February 1996 (age 30); Lahore, Punjab, Pakistan
- Height: 5 ft 9 in (175 cm)
- Batting: Left-handed
- Bowling: Right-arm medium-fast
- Role: Batting all-rounder

International information
- National side: Pakistan
- ODI debut (cap 219): 22 January 2019 v South Africa
- Last ODI: 11 November 2025 v Sri Lanka
- T20I debut (cap 77): 1 April 2018 v West Indies
- Last T20I: 28 September 2025 v India

Domestic team information
- Years: Team
- 2012–2013: Zarai Taraqiati Bank
- 2013/14–2018/19: Sui Northern Gas
- 2014/15–2018/19: Lahore
- 2016/17: Federally Administered Tribal Areas
- 2017–2021: Islamabad United (squad no. 12)
- 2017–2018: Federal Areas
- 2018: Cape Town Blitz
- 2018/19: Punjab
- 2019/20: Balochistan
- 2020/21: Southern Punjab (squad no. 90)
- 2021/22: Central Punjab
- 2022; 2024: 2025-present: Peshawar Zalmi (squad no. 23; formerly 8)
- 2022/23: Balochistan
- 2023: Lahore Qalandars
- 2024–present: Karnali Yaks

Career statistics
Competition	ODI	T20I	FC	LA
Matches	8	23	76	114
Runs scored	169	441	4,112	3,475
Batting average	28.16	22.05	39.92	39.92
100s/50s	0/1	0/2	7/24	8/21
Top score	62	63	253	141*
Balls bowled	60	72	3,765	1,673
Wickets	0	7	60	40
Bowling average	–	15.42	42.61	43.67
5 wickets in innings	–	0	0	0
10 wickets in match	–	0	0	0
Best bowling	–	2/12	3/24	4/54
Catches/stumpings	1/–	9/–	39/–	38/–
Medal record
Men's cricket
Representing Pakistan
Asia Cup
Runner-up	2025 UAE
- Source: Cricinfo, 13 November 2025

Mohammad Hussain Talat (Punjabi and Urdu: حسین طلعت; born 12 February 1996) is a Pakistani cricketer. He made his international debut for the Pakistan cricket team in April 2018. Domestically, he plays for Peshawar Zalmi in the Pakistan Super League (PSL).

== Early life ==
Raised in Shahdara, Lahore, Hussain Talat came from a cricket-oriented family that ran a local sports shop, Ravi Cricket Club. Informal street cricket provided the first exposure, with nearby success stories, most notably allrounder Abdul Razzaq, a former neighbour, serving as inspiration. At 15, he managed the family’s second outlet, New Lion Sports, located near the Abdul Razzaq Stadium, while training at Minto Park with Victorious Cricket Club. After leaving regular schooling in the seventh standard, Talat enrolled at Muslim Model School, which allowed sitting final exams while prioritising cricket practice. Daily routines typically involved morning and late-afternoon sessions separated by shop duties extending into the evening. Talat has described modest beginnings in a lower-middle-class setting, including seasonal sales of bangles, firecrackers and kite thread during Eid to supplement income.

== Domestic and franchise career ==
Talat made his first-class debut with Zarai Taraqiati Bank Limited during the 2012-2013 season, and in July 2013 a winnnig batting partnership with the then 18 years old Babar Azam was noted, when he was himself 17 years old.

In 2017, he made his PSL debut again Quetta Gladiators in which he scored a valuable fifty for his team and helped Islamabad United to win the game by 1 run. In April 2018, he was named in Federal Areas' squad for the 2018 Pakistan Cup. He was named the man of the match in the final of the tournament. On 3 June 2018, he was selected to play for the Toronto Nationals in the players' draft for the inaugural edition of the Global T20 Canada tournament.

In September 2019, he was named in Balochistan's squad for the 2019–20 Quaid-e-Azam Trophy tournament. In August 2020, he was named in Southern Punjab's squad for the 2020–21 domestic season. In October 2020, in the 2020–21 Quaid-e-Azam Trophy, Talat scored his maiden double century (253) in first-class cricket.

In 2021, he joined Rawalakot Hawks in the first edition of the Kashmir Premier League. He was the player of the tournament in the 2021 Kashmir Premier League for his all-round performance (227 runs and 4 wickets).

During PSL 2025, he was central to Peshawar Zalmi’s seven-wicket win over Lahore Qalandars, contributing in both disciplines. With the ball, Talat removed Sikandar Raza in the final over to end Lahore’s recovery. With the bat, Talat then anchored the chase from 7–2, scoring an unbeaten 51 off 37 balls and closing the match, and his fifty, with consecutive fours. Talat shared an unbroken 93-run fourth-wicket stand with Babar Azam (56* off 42) to seal the pursuit of 130 inside 17 overs.

== International career ==
In March 2018, he was named in Pakistan's Twenty20 International (T20I) squad for their series against the West Indies. He made his T20I debut for Pakistan against the West Indies on 1 April 2018 where he was named the man of the match.

In August 2018, he was one of thirty-three players to be awarded a central contract for the 2018–19 season by the Pakistan Cricket Board (PCB). In December 2018, he was named in Pakistan's team for the 2018 ACC Emerging Teams Asia Cup. The following month, he was named in Pakistan's One Day International (ODI) squad for their series against South Africa. He made his ODI debut for Pakistan against South Africa on 22 January 2019. In November 2020, he was named in Pakistan's 35-man squad for their tour to New Zealand.

In August 2025, during the first ODI of the Pakistan tour of the West Indies, his partnership with Hassan Nawaz was instrumental in Pakistan's win after a collapse of the middle-order while chasing 280, Talat hitting 41 in 37 balls and Pakistan winning by 5 wickets with only 7 balls remaining.

In September 2025, during the Asia Cup, after Pakistan’s five-wicket win over Sri Lanka in Abu Dhabi, Talat argued that middle-order batting is the hardest job in T20s. He underlined the point with an all-round display: 32 (30)* in a nervy chase of 133 and 2/18 in 3 overs earlier in the innings, eventually named the Player of the Match. He also suggested that only a handful of players can truly master the role.

== Playing style ==
Talat is a batting all-rounder, being primarily a left-handed batsman who bowls medium-fast. His batting has been described as defined less by volume than by elegance, an analyst arguing that his wide stroke range reflects innate talent more than drilled adjustments.

In an interview, Talat told that his batting development was shaped by high-scoring matches on Lahore's cement tracks, small grounds and a local culture of aggressive play. That environment encouraged power-hitting over defensive accumulation, gradually shifting Talat’s approach from conservatism toward expansive strokeplay and "big-hitting" fundamentals.
