= Saud Shakeel =

Pakistani cricketer (born 1995)

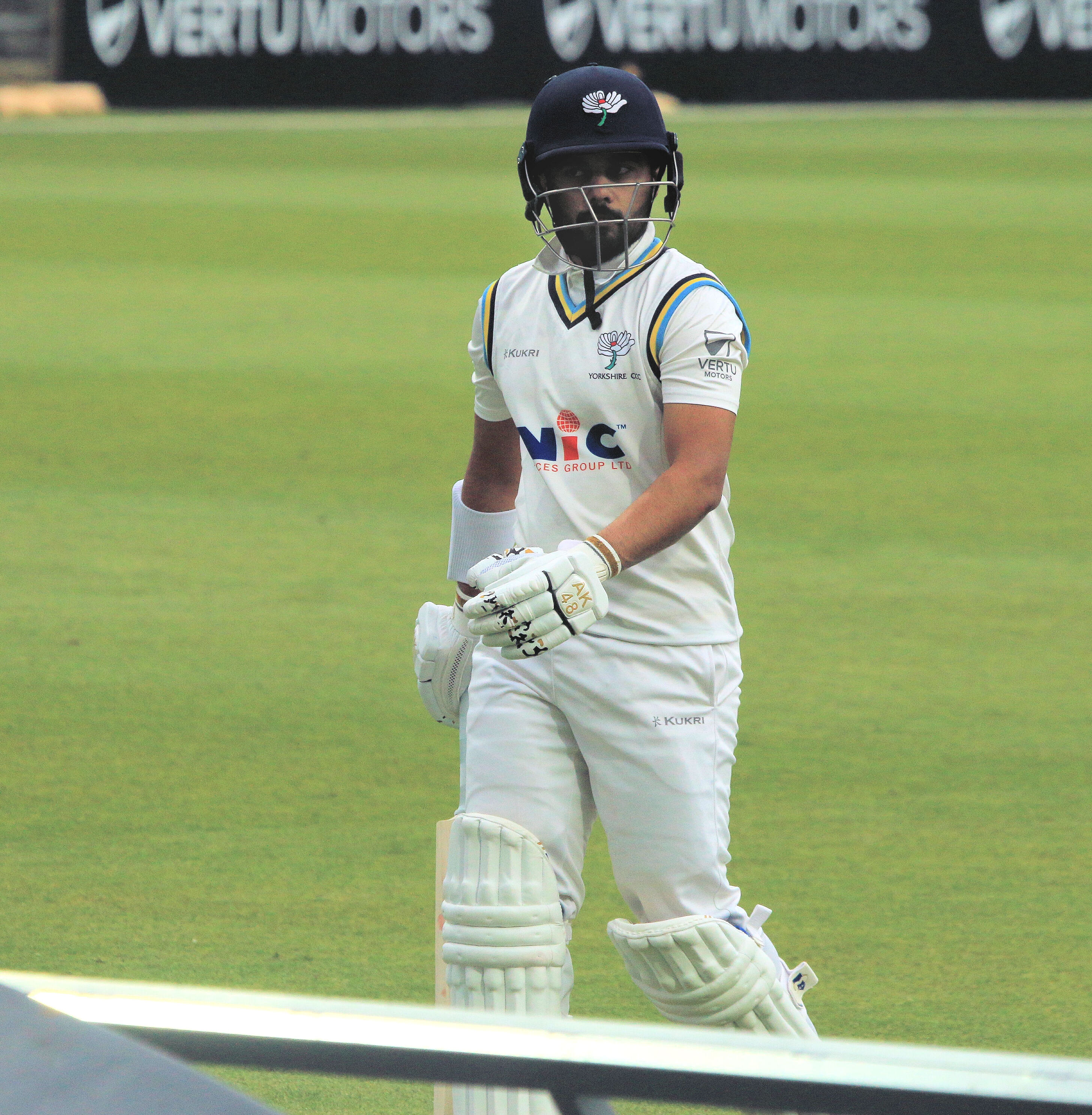
- Shakeel playing for Yorkshire (2023)

Personal information
- Born: 5 September 1995 (age 31); Karachi, Sindh, Pakistan
- Nickname: Chota Don
- Height: 1.68 m (5 ft 6 in)
- Batting: Left-handed
- Bowling: Left-arm slow
- Role: Middle-order batsman

International information
- National side: Pakistan (2021–present)
- Test debut (cap 250): 1 December 2022 v England
- Last Test: 9 September 2026 v England
- ODI debut (cap 231): 8 July 2021 v England
- Last ODI: 23 February 2025 v India
- ODI shirt no.: 59

Domestic team information
- Years: Team
- 2015–2016: Karachi Whites
- 2017/18: Pakistan Television
- 2018–2019, 2023–2025: Quetta Gladiators
- 2019–2023: Sindh
- 2023: Yorkshire

Career statistics
Competition	Test	ODI	FC	LA
Matches	26	19	100	102
Runs scored	2,006	408	7,209	3,140
Batting average	42.68	27.20	46.50	40.25
100s/50s	4/11	0/4	23/31	4/25
Top score	208*	68	208*	134*
Balls bowled	49	47	2,021	1,385
Wickets	0	1	24	33
Bowling average	–	37.00	50.41	38.18
5 wickets in innings	–	0	0	0
10 wickets in match	–	0	0	0
Best bowling	–	1/14	2/7	3/23
Catches/stumpings	15/–	6/–	51/–	31/–
- Source: Cricinfo, 12 September 2026

Saud Shakeel (born 5 September 1995) is a Pakistani international cricketer who is the current vice-captain of the Pakistan cricket team in test cricket. He made his international and ODI debut for the Pakistan cricket team in July 2021. He made his Test debut against England in December 2022. He played at the 2014 U-19 World Cup, where he captained the team. In July 2023, he became the first Pakistani batsman to score a Test double century in Sri Lanka against the hosts.

== Early life and career ==
Saud Shakeel was born in September 1995 in Karachi and spent much of his early life in the Sagheer Centre of the Federal B. Area.

In 2007, Saud came to the attention of Azam Khan, then manager of Quetta Gladiators and unrelated to Moin Khan's son. Through a connection with Saud's uncle, Azam introduced him, then a sixth-grade student at The Crescent Academy, to several cricket academies. After a tepid response from these academies, Azam integrated Saud into practice sessions where he faced players such as Rumman Raees, Anwar Ali, and Tabish Khan. This led to Saud's association with the Pakistan Cricket Club and mentorship from international cricketers such as Sarfaraz Ahmed and Asad Shafiq.

== Domestic career ==
He made his first-class debut on 26 October 2015 in the 2015–16 Quaid-e-Azam Trophy. In November 2017, he was selected to play for the Quetta Gladiators in 2018 Pakistan Super League players draft.

He was the leading run-scorer for Pakistan Television in the 2017–18 Quaid-e-Azam Trophy, with 488 runs in seven matches. In April 2018, he was named in Khyber Pakhtunkhwa's squad for the 2018 Pakistan Cup. He was the leading run-scorer for Pakistan Television in the 2018–19 Quaid-e-Azam Trophy, with 414 runs in five matches.

In December 2018, he was named in Pakistan's team for the 2018 ACC Emerging Teams Asia Cup. In March 2019, he was named in Federal Areas' squad for the 2019 Pakistan Cup. In September 2019, he was named in Sindh's squad for the 2019–20 Quaid-e-Azam Trophy tournament. In November 2019, he was named as the captain of Pakistan's squad for the 2019 ACC Emerging Teams Asia Cup in Bangladesh. In December 2020, he was shortlisted as one of the Domestic Cricketers of the Year for the 2020 PCB Awards.

== International career ==
In January 2021, he was named in Pakistan's Test squad for their series against South Africa. In March 2021, he was named in Pakistan's Test and limited overs squads for their tours to South Africa and Zimbabwe. However, he was ruled out of the One Day International (ODI) matches against South Africa due to an injury.

In June 2021, Shakeel was named in Pakistan's Test and ODI squads, for their tours of the West Indies and England respectively. Shakeel made his ODI debut on 8 July 2021, for Pakistan against England. In October 2021, he was named as the captain of the Pakistan Shaheens for their tour of Sri Lanka.

In November 2021, he was named in Pakistan's Test squad for their series against Bangladesh. In February 2022, he was also named in Pakistan's Test squad for their series against Australia. In June 2022, he was named in Pakistan's Test squad for their two-match series in Sri Lanka.

In December 2022, he was selected to play for Pakistan in the Test series against New Zealand. In the second Test, on 4 January 2023, he hit his maiden century in Test cricket, which helped Pakistan to put 400+ runs in the board in reply to New Zealand's 449 in the first innings.

In September 2023, he was named in Pakistan's fifteen-man squad for the Cricket World Cup 2023 in India, He made his World Cup debut on 6 October 2023 against the Netherlands in which he scored 68 runs in 52 balls, and received man of the match award. He also played a cameo against Sri Lanka in his second match of the World Cup scoring 31 runs off 30 balls. He scored his second fifty of the tournament against South Africa in a losing cause on 27 October as the latter pipped them by just 1 wicket.
