= Sri Lankan cricket team in Pakistan in 2026–27 =

International cricket tour

	Pakistan	Sri Lanka
- Dates: 9 October – 21 November 2026
Captains	Babar Azam (Tests); Sahibzada Farhan (T20Is)	Kusal Mendis (Tests & T20Is)

Test series
- Result: Pakistan won the 2-match series 1–0
Most runs	Saud Shakeel (214)	Dhananjaya de Silva (205)
Most wickets	Saqib Khan (9)	Asitha Fernando (9); Lahiru Kumara (9)
- Player of the series: Mohammad Abbas (Pak)

Twenty20 International series
- Results: Pakistan won the 3-match series 2–1
Most runs	Sahibzada Farhan (237)	Lahiru Udara (97)
Most wickets	Mohammad Imran Randhawa (6)	Eshan Malinga (5)
- Player of the series: Sahibzada Farhan (Pak)

The Sri Lankan cricket team toured Pakistan in October and November 2026 to play against the Pakistan cricket team. The tour consists of two Test matches, an ODI tri nations series with England and three Twenty20 International (T20I) matches. The Test series will form part of the 2025–2027 World Test Championship cycle. In August 2026, the Pakistan Cricket Board (PCB) confirmed the fixtures for the tour.

Pakistan won the T20I series by 2–1 alongside the ODI tri-series, beating Sri Lanka in the final. Pakistan also won the Test series by 1–0.

== Squads ==
Pakistan		Sri Lanka	
Tests	T20Is	Tests	T20Is
Babar Azam (c); Mohammad Abbas; Salman Ali Agha; Tayyab Arif; Azan Awais; Saad Baig (wk); Ghazi Ghori (wk); Aamir Jamal; Saqib Khan; Razaullah Mashwani; Arafat Minhas; Sameer Minhas; Ali Shabbir; Saud Shakeel; Mohammad Suleman; Mohammad Taha	Sahibzada Farhan (c); Abdul Samad; Abrar Ahmed; Arafat Minhas; Fakhar Zaman; Hassan Nawaz; Imran Randhawa; Khawaja Nafay (wk); Maaz Sadaqat; Naseem Shah; Razaullah Mashwani; Saim Ayub; Salman Mirza; Shadab Khan; Sufyan Moqim	Kusal Mendis (c, wk); Anjala Bandara (wk); Dinesh Chandimal (wk); Sonal Dinusha; Asitha Fernando; Prabath Jayasuriya; Lahiru Kumara; Dilshan Madushanka; Eshan Malinga; Kamindu Mendis; ~~Pathum Nissanka~~; Keshara Nuwantha; Milan Rathnayake; Dhananjaya de Silva; Pasindu Sooriyabandara; Lahiru Udara (wk)	Kusal Mendis (c, wk); Sahan Arachchige; Dushmantha Chameera; Binura Fernando; Sineth Jayawardena; Eshan Malinga; Kamindu Mendis; Kamil Mishara; Dasun Shanaka; Maheesh Theekshana; Nuwan Thushara; Lahiru Udara (wk); Vijayakanth Viyaskanth; Dunith Wellalage; Chamindu Wickramasinghe

On 27 October 2026, Pathum Nissanka was ruled out of the Test series due to hamstring injury and was replaced by Lahiru Udara. On 7 November, Tayyab Arif, Aamir Jamal, Saqib Khan and Ali Shabbir were added to the squad, while Abdullah Fazal and Ali Usman were released from the squad.

== Tour match ==
04–06 November 2026
Scorecard

Sri Lanka	v	PCB Patron's XI
223/7d (58 overs); Kusal Mendis 66 (72); Ali Shabbir 2/28 (8 overs)		151/8d (47 overs); Azan Awais 50 (85); Lahiru Kumara 2/16 (9 overs)
181 (54.3 overs); Milan Rathnayake 40 (77); Shoaib Akhtar 3/26 (13 overs)		111 (27.1 overs); Tayyab Arif 32 (31); Keshara Nuwantha 4/26 (7 overs)

Sri Lanka won by 142 runs
Islamabad Club Cricket Oval, Islamabad
Umpires: Tariq Rasheed (Pak) and Ahsan Raza (Pak)

- Sri Lanka won the toss and elected to bat.

== T20I series ==
=== 1st T20I ===
9 October 2026
18:00 (N)
Scorecard

Sri Lanka; 182/8 (20 overs)	v	Pakistan; 187/6 (18.5 overs)
Lahiru Udara 91 (55); Naseem Shah 3/36 (4 overs)		Sahibzada Farhan 89 (53); Maheesh Theekshana 2/36 (4 overs)

Pakistan won by 4 wickets
Rawalpindi Cricket Stadium, Rawalpindi
Umpires: Nasir Hussain (Pak) and Rashid Riaz (Pak)
Player of the match: Sahibzada Farhan (Pak)

- Sri Lanka won the toss and elected to bat.
- Razaullah Mashwani and Mohammad Imran Randhawa (Pak) both made their T20I debuts.
- Dushmantha Chameera (SL) took his 100th wicket in T20Is.

=== 2nd T20I ===
11 October 2026
18:00 (N)
Scorecard

Pakistan; 215/3 (20 overs)	v	Sri Lanka; 133/7 (20 overs)
Maaz Sadaqat 96 (51); Dasun Shanaka 1/30 (3 overs)		Maheesh Theekshana 32* (26); Mohammad Imran Randhawa 3/11 (4 overs)

Pakistan won by 82 runs
Rawalpindi Cricket Stadium, Rawalpindi
Umpires: Faisal Afridi (Pak) and Nasir Hussain (Pak)
Player of the match: Maaz Sadaqat (Pak)

- Sri Lanka won the toss and elected to field.

=== 3rd T20I ===
13 October 2026
18:00 (N)
Scorecard

Pakistan; 168/8 (20 overs)	v	Sri Lanka; 172/2 (17.1 overs)
Sahibzada Farhan 76 (47); Dasun Shanaka 3/21 (4 overs)		Kusal Mendis 87* (48); Arafat Minhas 1/26 (3 overs)

Sri Lanka won by 8 wickets
Rawalpindi Cricket Stadium, Rawalpindi
Umpires: Faisal Afridi (Pak) and Rashid Riaz (Pak)
Player of the match: Kusal Mendis (SL)

- Sri Lanka won the toss and elected to field.

== ODI Tri-Series ==
Following the T20I series, Pakistan and Sri Lanka competed in a ODI tri-series alongside England in Pakistan from 18 to 31 October 2026. Pakistan later won the series.

== Test series ==
=== 1st Test ===
9–13 November 2026
Scorecard

Pakistan	v	Sri Lanka
434/9d (106.3 overs); Saud Shakeel 93 (199); Asitha Fernando 3/107 (26 overs)		446 (117.2 overs); Dhananjaya de Silva 167 (246); Saqib Khan 7/130 (34 overs)
284/8 (84.5 overs); Saud Shakeel 97 (210); Milan Rathnayake 3/47 (20 overs)

Match drawn
Rawalpindi Cricket Stadium, Rawalpindi
Umpires: Adrian Holdstock (SA) and Rod Tucker (Aus)
Player of the match: Saqib Khan (Pak)

- Sri Lanka won the toss and elected to field.
- Tayyab Arif, Saqib Khan, Arafat Minhas and Mohammad Taha (Pak) all made their Test debuts.
- Asitha Fernando (SL) took his 100th wicket in Tests.
- Kusal Mendis (SL) scored his 13,000th run in international cricket.
- Saqib Khan (Pak) took his first five-wicket haul in Tests.
- World Test Championship points: Pakistan –1, Sri Lanka –11

=== 2nd Test ===
17–20 November 2026
Scorecard

Sri Lanka	v	Pakistan
98 (35.3 overs); Kusal Mendis 32 (50); Mohammad Abbas 3/14 (14 overs)		325 (87.5 overs); Ghazi Ghori 54 (90); Lahiru Kumara 5/95 (21.5 overs)
316 (95 overs); Milan Rathnayake 66* (88); Mohammad Abbas 3/55 (34 overs)		90/2 (13 overs); Aamer Jamal 34* (22); Lahiru Kumara 1/27 (5 overs)

Pakistan won by 8 wickets
Rawalpindi Cricket Stadium, Rawalpindi
Umpires: Adrian Holdstock (SA) and Allahudien Paleker (SA)
Player of the match: Mohammad Abbas (Pak)

- Pakistan won the toss and elected to field.
- The match was originally scheduled to be played at Gaddafi Stadium in Lahore, but was relocated to Rawalpindi due to prevailing weather conditions.
- Kusal Mendis (SL) scored his 5,000th run in Tests.
- World Test Championship points: Pakistan 12, Sri Lanka 0
