= Pakistani cricket team in England in 2026 =

International cricket tour

	England	Pakistan
- Dates: 19 August – 13 September 2026
Captains	Joe Root	Babar Azam (Note: Salman Ali Agha captained Pakistan in the 1st Test.)

Test series
- Result: England won the 3-match series 3–0
Most runs	Harry Brook (215)	Saud Shakeel (204)
Most wickets	Ollie Robinson (21)	Mohammad Abbas (13)
- Player of the series: Ollie Robinson (Eng); Mohammad Abbas (Pak)

The Pakistan cricket team toured England in August and September 2026 to play the England cricket team. The tour consisted of three Test matches. The Test series formed part of the 2025–2027 ICC World Test Championship. In July 2025, the England and Wales Cricket Board (ECB) confirmed the fixtures for the tour, as a part of the 2026 home international season.

== Squads ==
England	Pakistan
Joe Root (c); Harry Brook (vc); Jofra Archer; Gus Atkinson; Sonny Baker; Shoaib Bashir; Brydon Carse; Sam Cook; Jordan Cox (wk); Ben Duckett; Matthew Fisher; Emilio Gay; Dan Lawrence; Ollie Pope; Ollie Robinson; Jamie Smith (wk); Josh Tongue	Babar Azam (c); Mohammad Abbas; ~~Salman Ali Agha~~; Mohammad Ali; ~~Mohammad Awais~~; Azan Awais; Saim Ayub; Saad Baig; Abdullah Fazal; Ghazi Ghori (wk); ~~Imam-ul-Haq~~; Mohammad Imran; ~~Aamir Jamal~~; Sajid Khan; Shan Masood; Arafat Minhas; Mohammad Imran Randhawa; Razaullah Mashwani; ~~Mohammad Rizwan (wk)~~; Abdullah Shafique; ~~Khurram Shahzad~~; Saud Shakeel; Ubaid Shah; ~~Ali Usman~~

On 24 July, Abdullah Fazal was ruled out from the series due to a back injury and was replaced by Abdullah Shafique. On 18 August, Babar Azam was ruled out of the first Test due to a right hand injury.

On 24 August, Sonny Baker was added into the squad for the second Test, replacing Brydon Carse who was under investigation by the ECB.

On 31 August, Pakistan made several changes to their squad for the third Test, with Mohammad Rizwan, Imam-ul-Haq, Salman Ali Agha, Ali Usman, Aamir Jamal, Mohammad Awais and Khurram Shahzad replaced by Saim Ayub, Abdullah Fazal, Arafat Minhas, Mohammad Imran, Saad Baig, Mohammad Imran Randhawa and Razaullah Mashwani. On 2 September, England added Sam Cook in the squad for the third Test.

== Test series ==
=== 1st Test ===
19–21 August 2026 (Note: While five days of play were scheduled for this Test, the test reached a result in three days.)
Scorecard

Pakistan	v	England
171 (48.1 overs); Abdullah Shafique 61 (104); Josh Tongue 5/46 (9.1 overs)		409 (89.5 overs); Harry Brook 91 (93); Ali Usman 5/95 (24 overs)
135 (37.3 overs); Mohammad Rizwan 41 (39); Ollie Robinson 3/29 (11 overs)

England won by an innings and 103 runs
Headingley, Leeds
Umpires: Chris Gaffaney (NZ) and Allahudien Paleker (SA)
Player of the match: Ollie Robinson (Eng)

- England won the toss and elected to field.
- Only 57 overs of play was possible on Day 2 due to rain.
- Salman Ali Agha captained Pakistan for the first time in Tests.
- Ali Usman (Pak) took his maiden five-wicket haul in Tests.
- World Test Championship points: England 12, Pakistan 0.

=== 2nd Test ===
27–30 August 2026 (Note: While five days of play were scheduled for this Test, the test reached a result in four days.)
Scorecard

England	v	Pakistan
290 (66.4 overs); Jamie Smith 61 (80); Mohammad Abbas 4/73 (20 overs)		110 (37.2 overs); Azan Awais 46 (102); Ollie Robinson 4/11 (13 overs)
208 (54.2 overs); Dan Lawrence 54 (70); Mohammad Abbas 5/57 (22 overs)		194 (50.5 overs); Saud Shakeel 97 (122); Ollie Robinson 4/24 (14 overs)

England won by 194 runs
Lord's, London
Umpires: Allahudien Paleker (SA) and Paul Reiffel (Aus)
Player of the match: Ollie Robinson (Eng)

- Pakistan won the toss and elected to field.
- Only 24.5 overs of play was possible on Day 3 due to rain.
- World Test Championship points: England 12, Pakistan 0.

=== 3rd Test ===
9–12 September 2026 (Note: While five days of play were scheduled for this Test, the test reached a result in four days.)
Scorecard

Pakistan	v	England
133 (33.5 overs); Saud Shakeel 43 (47); Josh Tongue 4/42 (10 overs)		453 (89 overs); Harry Brook 75 (97); Razaullah Mashwani 4/148 (23 overs)
449 (96.4 overs); Shan Masood 95 (148); Gus Atkinson 3/109 (24 overs)		130/2 (24.2 overs); Joe Root 62* (69); Mohammad Abbas 2/27 (8 overs)

England won by 8 wickets
Edgbaston, Birmingham
Umpires: Chris Gaffaney (NZ) and Paul Reiffel (Aus)
Player of the match: Dan Lawrence (Eng)

- England won the toss and elected to field.
- Ghazi Ghori, Mohammad Imran Randhawa and Razaullah Mashwani (Pak) all made their Test debuts.
- Shan Masood (Pak) played in his 50th Test match.
- Ollie Robinson (Eng) took his 100th wicket in Tests.
- Joe Root (Eng) surpassed Steve Smith to become the fielder with most catches and Sachin Tendulkar to score most fifties in the history of Tests.
- World Test Championship points: England 12, Pakistan -11. (Note: Pakistan were deducted a total of 11 points as well as fined 50% of their match fees for maintaining a slow over-rate.)
