= 2026 National Champions Cup =

Cricket tournament

- Dates: 11 – 18 August 2026
- Administrator: Pakistan Cricket Board
- Cricket format: List A
- Tournament format(s): Round-robin and final
- Host: Multan
- Champions: Pakistan Gold (1st title)
- Participants: 4
- Matches: 7
- Player of the series: Fakhar Zaman (Pakistan Greens)
- Most runs: Fakhar Zaman (269)
- Most wickets: Shaheen Shah Afridi (13)

The 2026 National Champions Cup was the second edition of the Champions One-Day Cup, a List A cricket competition in Pakistan. The tournament began on 11 August 2026 and the final was held on 18 August 2026. Four teams took part in the tournament. In August 2026, Pakistan Cricket Board (PCB) confirmed the fixtures for the competition.

== Points table ==
Pos	Team	Pld	W	L	T	NR	Pts	NRR	Qualification
1	Pakistan Greens	3	3	0	0	0	6	2.180	Advanced to final
2	Pakistan Gold	3	1	2	0	0	2	−0.473	Advanced to final
3	Pakistan Whites	3	1	2	0	0	2	−0.805	Eliminated
4	Pakistan Blues	3	1	2	0	0	2	−1.093	Eliminated

Source: Cricinfo

== League stage ==
11 August 2026
15:00 (D/N)
Scorecard

Pakistan Whites; 276/8 (50 overs)	v	Pakistan Greens; 277/5 (49 overs)
Shahzaib Khan 76 (88); Naseem Shah 3/46 (9 overs)		Fakhar Zaman 123 (104); Saad Masood 2/30 (7 overs)

Pakistan Greens won by 5 wickets
Multan Cricket Stadium, Multan
Umpires: Zulfiqar Jan and Asif Yaqoob
Player of the match: Fakhar Zaman (Pakistan Greens)

- Pakistan Whites won the toss and elected to bat.
- Farhan Yousaf (Pakistan Greens) made his List A debuts.

12 August 2026
15:00 (D/N)
Scorecard

Pakistan Gold; 212 (45.3 overs)	v	Pakistan Blues; 213/4 (41.4 overs)
Kamran Ghulam 63 (84); Hasan Ali 4/32 (8.3 overs)		Sahibzada Farhan 102 (101); Mohammad Imran Randhawa 2/30 (5.4 overs)

Pakistan Blues won by 6 wickets
Multan Cricket Stadium, Multan
Umpires: Nasir Hussain and Rashid Riaz
Player of the match: Sahibzada Farhan (Pakistan Blues)

- Pakistan Gold won the toss and elected to bat.

13 August 2026
15:00 (D/N)
Scorecard

Pakistan Whites; 245 (49.3 overs)	v	Pakistan Blues; 239 (49.4 overs)
Shahzaib Khan 71 (85); Mohammad Faiq 3/36 (6 overs)		Maaz Sadaqat 59 (77); Mohammad Wasim Jr. 5/46 (10)

Pakistan Whites won by 6 run
Multan Cricket Stadium, Multan
Umpires: Faisal Afridi and Imtiaz Iqbal
Player of the match: Mohammad Wasim Jr. (Pakistan Whites)

- Pakistan Blues won the toss and elected to field.

14 August 2026
15:00 (D/N)
Scorecard

Pakistan Greens; 314 (50 overs)	v	Pakistan Gold; 186 (37 overs)
Fakhar Zaman 115 (105); Shaheen Shah Afridi 3/47 (10 overs)		Shamyl Hussain 53 (40); Mohammad Hasnain 3/32 (6 overs)

Pakistan Greens won by 128 runs
Multan Cricket Stadium, Multan
Umpires: Abdul Muqeet and Tariq Rasheed
Player of the match: Fakhar Zaman (Pakistan Greens)

- Pakistan Greens won the toss and elected to bat.
- Abdul Subhan (Pakistan Gold) made his List A debut.

15 August 2026
15:00 (D/N)
Scorecard

Pakistan Greens; 302/6 (50 overs)	v	Pakistan Blues; 110 (23.5 overs)
Mohammad Suleman 101* (103); Hasan Ali 2/37 (8 overs)		Arafat Minhas 38 (40); Faheem Ashraf 3/14 (3 overs)

Pakistan Greens won won by 192 runs
Multan Cricket Stadium, Multan
Umpires: Faisal Afridi and Zulfiqar Jan
Player of the match: Mohammad Suleman (Pakistan Greens)

- Pakistan Greens won the toss and elected to bat.

16 August 2026
15:00 (D/N)
Scorecard

Pakistan Whites; 172 (41.4 overs)	v	Pakistan Gold; 173/5 (28 overs)
Hassan Nawaz 55 (74); Shaheen Shah Afridi 3/26 (8 overs)		Haider Ali 69* (47); Mohammad Wasim Jr. 2/47 (8 overs)

Pakistan Gold won by 5 wickets
Multan Cricket Stadium, Multan
Umpires: Nasir Hussain and Tariq Rasheed
Player of the match: Haider Ali (Pakistan Gold)

- Pakistan Gold won the toss and elected to field.

== Final ==
August 2026
15:00 (D/N)
Scorecard

Pakistan Gold; 340 (50 overs)	v	Pakistan Greens; 239 (37.3 overs)
Saad Khan 112 (102); Shadab Khan 2/45 (10 overs)		Saad Baig 67 (51); Shaheen Shah Afridi 7/36 (8.3 overs)

Pakistan Gold won by 101 runs
Multan Cricket Stadium, Multan
Umpires: Rashid Riaz and Asif Yaqoob
Player of the match: Shaheen Shah Afridi (Pakistan Gold)

- Pakistan Gold won the toss and elected to bat.
