= Australian cricket team in Pakistan in 2026 =

International cricket tour

Australia tour of Pakistan, 2026
	Pakistan	Australia
- Dates: 30 May – 4 June 2026
Captains	Shaheen Shah Afridi	Josh Inglis

One Day International series
- Results: Pakistan won the 3-match series 2–1
Most runs	Babar Azam (125)	Josh Inglis (129)
Most wickets	Shaheen Shah Afridi (7); Arafat Minhas (7)	Nathan Ellis (7)
- Player of the series: Arafat Minhas (Pak)

The Australian cricket team visited Pakistan in May and June 2026 to play the Pakistan cricket team. The tour consisted of three ODI matches. In May 2026, the Pakistan Cricket Board (PCB) confirmed the fixtures for the tour. It was also Australia's first ODI tour to Pakistan since 2022.

== Squads ==
Pakistan	Australia
Shaheen Shah Afridi (c); Salman Ali Agha; Abrar Ahmed; Babar Azam; Ahmed Daniyal; Sahibzada Farhan; Ghazi Ghori (wk); Shamyl Hussain; Shadab Khan; Arafat Minhas; Sufyan Moqim; Rohail Nazir (wk); Haris Rauf; Maaz Sadaqat; Abdul Samad; Naseem Shah	~~Mitchell Marsh (c)~~; Josh Inglis (c, wk); Alex Carey (wk); Cooper Connolly; Nathan Ellis; Cameron Green; Matthew Kuhnemann; Marnus Labuschagne; Riley Meredith; Oliver Peake; Matthew Renshaw; Tanveer Sangha; Liam Scott; Matthew Short; Billy Stanlake; Adam Zampa

Mitchell Marsh was ruled out of the tour due to an ankle injury, and Josh Inglis was named as the stand-in captain.

== ODI series ==
=== 1st ODI ===
30 May 2026
16:30 (D/N)
Scorecard

Australia; 200 (44.1 overs)	v	Pakistan; 202/5 (42.3 overs)
Matt Renshaw 61 (63); Arafat Minhas 5/32 (10 overs)		Babar Azam 69 (94); Nathan Ellis 2/45 (7 overs)

Pakistan won by 5 wickets
Rawalpindi Cricket Stadium, Rawalpindi
Umpires: Kumar Dharmasena (SL) and Asif Yaqoob (Pak)
Player of the match: Arafat Minhas (Pak)

- Pakistan won the toss and elected to field.
- This was Pakistan's 1000th ODI.
- Arafat Minhas (Pak) and Oliver Peake (Aus) both made their ODI debuts.
- Arafat Minhas (Pak) became the first Pakistani bowler to take a five-wicket haul on his ODI debut.

=== 2nd ODI ===
2 June 2026
16:30 (D/N)
Scorecard

Australia; 231/9 (50 overs)	v	Pakistan; 190 (44 overs)
Cameron Green 53 (92); Shaheen Shah Afridi 3/36 (8 overs)		Shadab Khan 71 (104); Nathan Ellis 4/33 (9 overs)

Australia won by 41 runs
Gaddafi Stadium, Lahore
Umpires: Faisal Afridi (Pak) and Richard Kettleborough (Eng)
Player of the match: Nathan Ellis (Aus)

- Pakistan won the toss and elected to field.

=== 3rd ODI ===
4 June 2026
16:30 (D/N)
Scorecard

Australia; 157 (42 overs)	v	Pakistan; 161/6 (41.5 overs)
Josh Inglis 65 (71); Shaheen Shah Afridi 3/30 (8 overs)		Babar Azam 40 (84); Matthew Kuhnemann 3/38 (10 overs)

Pakistan won by 4 wickets
Gaddafi Stadium, Lahore
Umpires: Kumar Dharmasena (SL) and Ahsan Raza (Pak)
Player of the match: Shaheen Shah Afridi (Pak)

- Australia won the toss and elected to bat.
