= Pakistani cricket team in Bangladesh in 2025–26 =

International cricket tour

	Bangladesh	Pakistan
- Dates: 11 March – 20 May 2026
Captains	Najmul Shanto (Tests); Mehidy Miraz (ODIs)	Shan Masood (Tests); Shaheen Afridi (ODIs)

Test series
- Result: Bangladesh won the 2-match series 2–0
Most runs	Mushfiqur Rahim (253)	Mohammad Rizwan (181)
Most wickets	Taijul Islam (13)	Mohammad Abbas (10)
- Player of the series: Mushfiqur Rahim (Ban)

One Day International series
- Results: Bangladesh won the 3-match series 2–1
Most runs	Tanzid Hasan (175)	Salman Ali Agha (174)
Most wickets	Nahid Rana (8)	Haris Rauf (6)
- Player of the series: Tanzid Hasan (Ban); Nahid Rana (Ban)

The Pakistan cricket team toured Bangladesh in March 2026 to play three One Day International (ODI) matches against the Bangladesh cricket team. All the matches were played at Sher-e-Bangla National Cricket Stadium at Dhaka. They later returned in May 2026 to play two Test matches. The Test series forms part of the 2025–2027 ICC World Test Championship.

Bangladesh won the ODI series by 2-1 margin. They also won the test series by 2-0 margin, becoming the first team to whitewash Pakistan both at home and away.

== Squads ==
Bangladesh		Pakistan	
Tests	ODIs	Tests	ODIs
Najmul Hossain Shanto (c); Mehidy Hasan Miraz (vc); Litton Das (wk); Taskin Ahmed; Mominul Haque; Amite Hasan; Nayeem Hasan; Tanzid Hasan; Zakir Hasan; Ebadot Hossain; Shadman Islam; Shoriful Islam; Taijul Islam; Mahmudul Hasan Joy; Nahid Rana; Mushfiqur Rahim	Mehidy Hasan Miraz (c); Najmul Hossain Shanto (vc); Taskin Ahmed; Mahidul Islam Ankon (wk); Litton Das (wk); Saif Hassan; Tanzid Hasan; Afif Hossain; Rishad Hossain; Tawhid Hridoy; Shoriful Islam; Tanvir Islam; Nahid Rana; Mustafizur Rahman; Soumya Sarkar	Shan Masood (c); Mohammad Abbas; Shaheen Shah Afridi; Salman Ali Agha; Hasan Ali; Noman Ali; Azan Awais; Babar Azam; Amad Butt; Abdullah Fazal; Imam-ul-Haq; Ghazi Ghori (wk); Sajid Khan; Mohammad Rizwan (wk); Khurram Shahzad; Saud Shakeel	Shaheen Afridi (c); Salman Ali Agha; Abrar Ahmed; Faisal Akram; Faheem Ashraf; Sahibzada Farhan; Ghazi Ghori (wk); Shamyl Hussain; Saad Masood; Haris Rauf; Mohammad Rizwan (wk); Maaz Sadaqat; Abdul Samad; Hussain Talat; Mohammad Wasim Jr.

Ahead of the second Test, Shadman Islam was replaced by Zakir Hasan due to injury.

== ODI series ==
=== 1st ODI ===
11 March 2026
14:15 (D/N)
Scorecard

Pakistan; 114 (30.4 overs)	v	Bangladesh; 115/2 (15.1 overs)
Faheem Ashraf 37 (47); Nahid Rana 5/24 (7 overs)		Tanzid Hasan 67* (42); Mohammad Wasim Jr. 1/24 (3.1 overs)

Bangladesh won by 8 wickets
Sher-e-Bangla National Cricket Stadium, Dhaka
Umpires: Kumar Dharmasena (SL) and Gazi Sohel (Ban)
Player of the match: Nahid Rana (Ban)

- Bangladesh won the toss and elected to field.
- Abdul Samad, Maaz Sadaqat, Sahibzada Farhan and Shamyl Hussain (Pak) all made their ODI debuts.
- Nahid Rana (Ban) took his first five-wicket haul in ODIs.
- This was Pakistan's lowest total against Bangladesh in ODIs.

=== 2nd ODI ===
13 March 2026
14:15 (D/N)
Scorecard

Pakistan; 274 (47.3 overs)	v	Bangladesh; 114 (23.3 overs)
Maaz Sadaqat 75 (46); Rishad Hossain 3/56 (9.3 overs)		Litton Das 41 (33); Maaz Sadaqat 3/23 (5 overs)

Pakistan won by 128 runs (DLS method)
Sher-e-Bangla National Cricket Stadium, Dhaka
Umpires: Tanvir Ahmed (Ban) and Adrian Holdstock (SA)
Player of the match: Maaz Sadaqat (Pak)

- Bangladesh won the toss and elected to field.
- Bangladesh were set a revised target of 243 runs from 32 overs due to rain.

=== 3rd ODI ===
15 March 2026
14:15 (D/N)
Scorecard

Bangladesh; 290/5 (50 overs)	v	Pakistan; 279 (50 overs)
Tanzid Hasan 107 (107); Haris Rauf 3/52 (10 overs)		Salman Ali Agha 106 (98); Taskin Ahmed 4/49 (10 overs)

Bangladesh won by 11 runs
Sher-e-Bangla National Cricket Stadium, Dhaka
Umpires: Kumar Dharmasena (SL) and Masudur Rahman (Ban)
Player of the match: Tanzid Hasan (Ban)

- Pakistan won the toss and elected to field.
- Ghazi Ghori and Saad Masood (Pak) both made their ODI debuts.
- Tanzid Hasan (Ban) scored his maiden century in ODIs.

== Test series ==
=== 1st Test ===
8–12 May 2026
Scorecard

Bangladesh	v	Pakistan
413 (117.1 overs); Najmul Hossain Shanto 101 (130); Mohammad Abbas 5/92 (34 overs)		386 (100.3 overs); Azan Awais 103 (165); Mehidy Hasan Miraz 5/103 (38 overs)
240/9d (70.3 overs); Najmul Hossain Shanto 87 (150); Hasan Ali 3/52 (17.3 overs)		163 (52.5 overs); Abdullah Fazal 66 (113); Nahid Rana 5/40 (9.5 overs)

Bangladesh won by 104 runs
Sher-e-Bangla National Cricket Stadium, Dhaka
Umpires: Kumar Dharmasena (SL) and Richard Kettleborough (Eng)
Player of the match: Najmul Hossain Shanto (Ban)

- Pakistan won the toss and elected to field.
- Azan Awais and Abdullah Fazal (Pak) both made their Test debuts.
- Mushfiqur Rahim scored his 42nd 50+ score in Tests, the most by any Bangladeshi batter.
- Azan Awais (Pak) scored his maiden century in Tests.
- Mominul Haque (Ban) scored his 5,000th run in Tests.
- Noman Ali (Pak) took his 100th wicket in Tests.
- World Test Championship points: Bangladesh 12, Pakistan −8. (Note: Pakistan were deducted 8 points for a slow over-rate.)

=== 2nd Test ===
16–20 May 2026
Scorecard

Bangladesh	v	Pakistan
278 (77 overs); Litton Das 126 (159); Khurram Shahzad 4/81 (17 overs)		232 (57.4 overs); Babar Azam 68 (84); Nahid Rana 3/60 (12.4 overs)
390 (102.2 overs); Mushfiqur Rahim 137 (233); Khurram Shahzad 4/86 (20 overs)		358 (97.2 overs); Mohammad Rizwan 94 (166); Taijul Islam 6/120 (34.2 overs)

Bangladesh won by 78 runs
Sylhet International Cricket Stadium, Sylhet
Umpires: Kumar Dharmasena (SL) (Note: Kumar Dharmasena replaced Richard Kettleborough on the Day 3.) and Allahudien Paleker (SA)
Player of the match: Litton Das (Ban)

- Pakistan won the toss and elected to field.
- Tanzid Hasan (Ban) made his Test debut.
- World Test Championship points: Bangladesh 12, Pakistan 0.
