= Pakistan Shaheens cricket team in England in 2025 =

International cricket tour

	First Class Counties XI	Pakistan Shaheens
- Dates: 22 July – 5 August 2025
Captains	Luc Benkenstein	Saud Shakeel

LA series
- Result: Pakistan Shaheens won the 3-match series 2–1
Most runs	Hamza Shaikh (111)	Azan Awais (164)
Most wickets	Scott Currie (5)	Ubaid Shah (6)

The Pakistan Shaheens cricket team toured England in July and August 2025 to play against the First Class Counties XI. The tour consisted of three List A cricket matches.

Pakistan Shaheens won the three-match List A series 2-1 against the First Class Counties XI.

== List A series ==
=== 1st List A match ===
22 July 2025
11:00
Scorecard

First Class Counties XI; 187 (27.4 overs)	v	Pakistan Shaheens; 204/5 (27.5 overs)
Will Smeed 84 (62); Maaz Sadaqat 3/28 (4.4 overs)		Saud Shakeel 72* (72); Tom Lawes 2/38 (6 overs)

Pakistan Shaheens won by 5 wickets (DLS method)
County Cricket Ground, Beckenham
Umpires: Naeem Ashraf (Eng) and Paul Sparshot (Eng)

- First Class Counties XI won the toss and elected to bat.
- The match was reduced to 28 overs per side due to rain.
- Jafer Chohan, Ismail Mohammed and Joe Moores (First Class Counties XI) all made their List A debuts.
- Faisal Akram (Pakistan Shaheens) took his 50th wicket in List A cricket.
- Pakistan Shaheens were set a revised target of 204 runs in 28 overs due to rain.
- Saud Shakeel (Pakistan Shaheens) scored his 3,000th run in List A cricket.

=== 2nd List A match ===
25 July 2025
11:00
Scorecard

Pakistan Shaheens; 152 (29.3 overs)	v	First Class Counties XI; 153/3 (26 overs)
Azan Awais 68 (85); Jafer Chohan 4/43 (5.3 overs)		Hamza Shaikh 54* (63); Shahid Aziz 1/26 (4 overs)

First Class Counties XI won by 7 wickets
County Cricket Ground, Beckenham
Umpires: Surendiran Shanmugam (Eng) and Paul Sparshott (Eng)

- First Class Counties XI won the toss and elected to field.

=== 3rd List A match ===
27 July 2025
Scorecard

First Class Counties XI; 260 (46.4 overs)	v	Pakistan Shaheens; 264/5 (43.5 overs)
Ollie Skyes 64 (56); Ubaid Shah 4/41 (9.4 overs)		Azan Awais 88 (104); Calvin Harrison 2/48 (8 overs)

Pakistan Shaheens won by 5 wickets
County Cricket Ground, Hove
Umpires: Surendiran Shanmugam (Eng) and Paul Sparshott (Eng)

- Pakistan Shaheens won the toss and elected to field.
- Thomas Rew (First Class Counties XI) made his List A debut.

== Tour matches ==
=== 1st tour match ===
29–31 July 2025
Scorecard

Pakistan Shaheens	v	First Class Counties XI
243 (69.2 overs); Azan Awais 98 (170); Nathan Gilchrist 3/50 (16 overs)		351/7d (77.2 overs); Luc Benkenstein 197 (248); Mir Hamza 3/39 (17 overs)
50/4 (11.5 overs); Haider Ali 17 (11); Mitchell Stanley 3/30 (5.5 overs)

Match drawn
County Cricket Ground, Hove
Umpires: Anthony Harris (Eng) and Raymond Parker (Eng)

- First Class Counties XI won the toss and elected to field.

=== 2nd tour match ===
3–5 August 2025
Scorecard

Pakistan Shaheens	v	MCC Young Cricketers and South Asian Cricket Academy XI
385/8d (92 overs); Rohail Nazir 100* (120); Eesa Nadeem 2/43 (9 overs)		278 (80.2 overs); Feroze Khushi 90* (142); Mubasir Khan 3/59 (18 overs)
196/2d (50.5 overs); Ali Zaryab 100* (141); Hishaam Khan 1/15 (7 overs)

Match drawn
County Cricket Ground, Beckenham
Umpires: Paul Nicholls (Eng) and Bilal Shafayat (Eng)

- Pakistan Shaheens won the toss and elected to bat.
