= Pakistani cricket team in New Zealand in 2024–25 =

International cricket tour

	New Zealand	Pakistan
- Dates: 16 March – 5 April 2025
Captains	Michael Bracewell	Mohammad Rizwan (ODIs); Salman Ali Agha (T20Is)

One Day International series
- Results: New Zealand won the 3-match series 3–0
Most runs	Daryl Mitchell (137)	Babar Azam (129)
Most wickets	Ben Sears (10)	Akif Javed (7)
- Player of the series: Ben Sears (NZ)

Twenty20 International series
- Results: New Zealand won the 5-match series 4–1
Most runs	Tim Seifert (249)	Salman Ali Agha (167)
Most wickets	Jacob Duffy (13)	Haris Rauf (8)
- Player of the series: Tim Seifert (NZ)

The Pakistan cricket team toured New Zealand in March and April 2025 to play the New Zealand cricket team. The tour consisted of three One Day International (ODI) and five Twenty20 International (T20I) matches. In July 2024, New Zealand Cricket (NZC) confirmed the fixtures for the tour, as a part of the 2024–25 home international season.

== Background ==
The 2024–25 Pakistan cricket team tour of New Zealand features five T20Is and three ODIs as part of both teams International schedules. Pakistan, under new T20I captain Salman Ali Agha and ODI captain Mohammad Rizwan, has rested senior players like Babar Azam. Aaqib Javed serves as interim head coach.

== Squads ==
New Zealand		Pakistan	
ODIs	T20Is	ODIs	T20Is
Michael Bracewell (c); ~~Tom Latham (c)~~; Muhammad Abbas; Adithya Ashok; Mark Chapman; Jacob Duffy; Mitchell Hay (wk); Nick Kelly; Rhys Mariu (Note: In squad for 2nd and 3rd ODI only.); Daryl Mitchell; Henry Nicholls; Will O’Rourke; Ben Sears; Tim Seifert; Nathan Smith; Will Young (Note: In squad for 1st ODI only.)	Michael Bracewell (c); Finn Allen; Mark Chapman; Jacob Duffy; Zak Foulkes; Mitchell Hay (wk); ~~Matt Henry~~; Kyle Jamieson (Note: In squad for 1st, 2nd and 3rd T20I only.); Daryl Mitchell; James Neesham; Will O’Rourke; Tim Robinson; Ben Sears; Tim Seifert (wk); Ish Sodhi	Mohammad Rizwan (c, wk); Salman Ali Agha (vc); Abrar Ahmed; Mohammad Ali; Faheem Ashraf; Babar Azam; Imam-ul-Haq; Akif Javed; Usman Khan; Sufiyan Muqeem; Irfan Khan Niazi; Abdullah Shafique; Khushdil Shah; Naseem Shah; Tayyab Tahir; Mohammad Wasim Jr.	Salman Ali Agha (c); Shadab Khan (vc); Abbas Afridi; Shaheen Afridi; Abrar Ahmed; Mohammad Ali; Mohammad Haris (wk); Jahandad Khan; Usman Khan; Sufiyan Muqeem; Hassan Nawaz (wk); Irfan Khan Niazi; Haris Rauf; Abdul Samad; Khushdil Shah; Omair Yousuf

On 22 March, Matt Henry was ruled out of the T20I series. Ahead of the ODI series, Tom Latham was ruled out of the series due to fractured hand. He was replaced by Henry Nicholls in the squad with Michael Bracewell being named the ODI captain. Will Young was also confirmed to withdraw from the ODI series after the first game due to impending fatherhood and was replaced by Rhys Mariu for the last two ODIs. On 1st April, Tim Seifert was added to New Zealand's squad for the second ODI as a replacement for Mark Chapman who was diagnosed with a grade-one hamstring tear.

On 30 March, Usman Khan was ruled out of the second ODI due to a hamstring injury.

== T20I series ==
=== 1st T20I ===
16 March 2025
14:15
Scorecard

Pakistan; 91 (18.4 overs)	v	New Zealand; 92/1 (10.1 overs)
Khushdil Shah 32 (30); Jacob Duffy 4/14 (3.4 overs)		Tim Seifert 44 (29); Abrar Ahmed 1/15 (2.1 overs)

New Zealand won by 9 wickets
Hagley Oval, Christchurch
Umpires: Wayne Knights (NZ) and Sam Nogajski (Aus)
Player of the match: Kyle Jamieson (NZ)

- New Zealand won the toss and elected to field.
- Mohammad Ali, Hassan Nawaz and Abdul Samad (Pak) all made their T20I debuts.
- This was Pakistan's lowest total against New Zealand in T20Is.

=== 2nd T20I ===
18 March 2025
14:15
Scorecard

Pakistan; 135/9 (15 overs)	v	New Zealand; 137/5 (13.1 overs)
Salman Ali Agha 46 (28); Ish Sodhi 2/17 (2 overs)		Tim Seifert 45 (22); Khushdil Shah 1/16 (3 overs)

New Zealand won by 5 wickets
University of Otago Oval, Dunedin
Umpires: Chris Brown (NZ) and Wayne Knights (NZ)
Player of the match: Tim Seifert (NZ)

- New Zealand won the toss and elected to field.
- The match was reduced to 15 overs per side due to rain.

=== 3rd T20I ===
21 March 2025
19:15 (N)
Scorecard

New Zealand; 204 (19.5 overs)	v	Pakistan; 207/1 (16 overs)
Mark Chapman 94 (44); Haris Rauf 3/29 (4 overs)		Hassan Nawaz 105* (45); Jacob Duffy 1/37 (3 overs)

Pakistan won by 9 wickets
Eden Park, Auckland
Umpires: Shaun Haig (NZ) and Sam Nogajski (Aus)
Player of the match: Hassan Nawaz (Pak)

- Pakistan won the toss and elected to field.
- Hassan Nawaz (Pak) scored his maiden century in T20Is. He scored the fastest century in T20Is for a Pakistani batsman (off 44 balls).

=== 4th T20I ===
23 March 2025
19:15 (N)
Scorecard

New Zealand; 220/6 (20 overs)	v	Pakistan; 105 (16.2 overs)
Finn Allen 50 (20); Haris Rauf 3/27 (4 overs)		Abdul Samad 44 (30); Jacob Duffy 4/20 (4 overs)

New Zealand won by 115 runs
Bay Oval, Mount Maunganui
Umpires: Chris Brown (NZ) and Wayne Knights (NZ)
Player of the match: Finn Allen (NZ)

- Pakistan won the toss and elected to field.
- This was Pakistan's biggest margin of defeat (in terms of runs) in T20Is.

=== 5th T20I ===
26 March 2025
19:15 (N)
Scorecard

Pakistan; 128/9 (20 overs)	v	New Zealand; 131/2 (10 overs)
Salman Ali Agha 51 (39); James Neesham 5/22 (4 overs)		Tim Seifert 97* (38); Sufiyan Muqeem 2/6 (2 overs)

New Zealand won by 8 wickets
Wellington Regional Stadium, Wellington
Umpires: Shaun Haig (NZ) and Wayne Knights (NZ)
Player of the match: James Neesham (NZ)

- New Zealand won the toss and elected to field.
- James Neesham (NZ) took his maiden five wicket haul in T20Is.

== ODI series ==
=== 1st ODI ===
29 March 2025
11:00
Scorecard

New Zealand; 344/9 (50 overs)	v	Pakistan; 271 (44.1 overs)
Mark Chapman 132 (111); Irfan Khan Niazi 3/51 (5 overs)		Babar Azam 78 (83); Nathan Smith 4/60 (8.1 overs)

New Zealand won by 73 runs
McLean Park, Napier
Umpires: Chris Brown (NZ) and Paul Reiffel (Aus)
Player of the match: Mark Chapman (NZ)

- Pakistan won the toss and elected to field.
- Muhammad Abbas, Nick Kelly (NZ), Mohammad Ali, Akif Javed and Usman Khan (Pak) all made their ODI debuts.

=== 2nd ODI ===
2 April 2025
11:00
Scorecard

New Zealand; 292/8 (50 overs)	v	Pakistan; 208 (41.2 overs)
Mitchell Hay 99* (78); Sufiyan Muqeem 2/33 (10 overs)		Faheem Ashraf 73 (80); Ben Sears 5/59 (9.2 overs)

New Zealand won by 84 runs
Seddon Park, Hamilton
Umpires: Michael Gough (Eng) and Wayne Knights (NZ)
Player of the match: Mitchell Hay (NZ)

- Pakistan won the toss and elected to field.
- Rhys Mariu (NZ) made his ODI debut.
- Naseem Shah (Pak) replaced Haris Rauf as a concussion substitute during the second innings of the match.
- Ben Sears (NZ) took his first five-wicket haul in ODIs.

=== 3rd ODI ===
5 April 2025
11:00
Scorecard

New Zealand; 264/8 (42 overs)	v	Pakistan; 221 (40 overs)
Michael Bracewell 59 (40); Akif Javed 4/62 (8 overs)		Babar Azam 50 (58); Ben Sears 5/34 (9 overs)

New Zealand won by 43 runs
Bay Oval, Mount Maunganui
Umpires: Chris Brown (NZ) and Paul Reiffel (Aus)
Player of the match: Michael Bracewell (NZ)

- Pakistan won the toss and elected to field.
- The match was reduced to 42 overs per side due to rain.
- Usman Khan (Pak) replaced Imam-ul-Haq as a concussion substitute during the second innings of the match.
