= Pakistan Junior League =

Pakistani cricket tournament

- Official logo of PJL
- Countries: Pakistan
- Administrator: Pakistan Cricket Board
- Format: 20-over cricket
- First edition: 2022
- Latest edition: 2022
- Tournament format: Single Round Robin
- Number of teams: 6
- Most successful: Bahawalpur Royals (1 title)

The Pakistan Junior League (PJL) was a professional 20-over cricket league contested by Under-19 teams representing different cities of Pakistan. The league was soft-launched on 14 April 2022 by the Pakistan Cricket Board (PCB) Chairman, Ramiz Raja. The only installment, the 2022 Pakistan Junior League (also known as PJL1), was played from 6–21 October 2022, featuring six teams and 19 games, at Gaddafi Stadium, Lahore. Draft for the league was held on 8 Sep 2022, 24 foreign players from nine countries were selected by teams along with 66 local players. It featured six teams playing 19 games in a round robin league format, at Gaddafi Stadium, Lahore. It was the first international league to exclusively consist of junior cricketers. Bahawalpur Royals beat Gwadar Sharks in the final on 21 October and became the inaugural and only champions of the PJL. The league was dissolved in December 2022.

== History ==
=== Conception ===
We talked about [improving the] pathways to professional cricket. In October next year, we'll launch an U19 PSL. This is very exciting because it's never happened anywhere else.

— Ramiz Raja, November 2021

Shortly after his promotion to the position of PCB Chairman in September 2021, Ramiz Raja outlined his plans to improve cricket in Pakistan. Highlighting that the board needed to facilitate the transformation of young cricketers into world-class players, he expressed the desire to introduce an 'Under-19 T20 World League'. Over the following months, further details of this vision were outlined and Raja described his aspiration to expand the already successful Pakistan Super League (PSL) into two additional versions tailored to youth cricket and women's cricket. At the 67th Board of Governors meeting in December 2021, Pakistan's Pathway Cricket Foundation was identified as an initiative that would look to nurture 100 young cricketers in preparation for the upcoming launch of an 'U-19 PSL'.

=== Launch ===
On 14 April 2022, the PCB, through their official website, announced the launch of the PJL. The announcement was accompanied by a statement from Raja who confirmed the inaugural season would take place in October 2022. In addition, the PCB had initiated the process to secure title, category sponsorships, live streaming providers and franchise owners. The competition was to be a city-based league with players selected through a draft system. The PCB planned to involve international age-group cricketers from various nations as well.

=== Marketing ===
The season's logo variant was unveiled with the hashtag #Next11 and #PJL also being used on social media.

The tournament was broadcast live on PTV Sports and live streamed on Geo Super's App and Geo Super's YouTube and Facebook pages in Pakistan. Live streaming was made available on the PCB YouTube/Facebook and PJL YouTube/Facebook channels for the rest of the world.

The tournament broadcast was done through a 22 camera full HD production including enhancements such as Buggy cam and drone camera.

The commentary panel for the inaugural edition included prominent commentators Daren Ganga, Dominic Cork and Mike Haysman. Former Pakistan captain Sana Mir, former Zimbabwe player Tino Mawoyo and seasoned broadcaster Sikander Bakht was also a part of the panel. Roha Nadeem was the presenter.

=== Dissolution ===
The Pakistan Junior League was dissolved by the newly appointed PCB Management Committee on 31 December 2022. It was dissolved after the first edition had cost approximately Rs. 997 million and had earned returns of Rs. 190 million, causing losses of US$4 million.

== Teams ==
On 30 August 2022, PCB announced the names of the six teams for the inaugural edition of the Pakistan Junior League, each representing one city of Pakistan. These names were different from those used by the teams of the Pakistan Super League. Although the PCB had initially had planned a franchise model similar to that of PSL, it decided to take up the ownership of the teams itself after the base price set up for the ownership of teams was not met by the bidders.

Team	Mentor
Bahawalpur Royals	Imran Tahir
Gujranwala Giants	Shoaib Malik
Gwadar Sharks	Viv Richards
Hyderabad Hunters	Daren Sammy
Mardan Warriors	Shahid Afridi
Rawalpindi Raiders	Colin Munro

== Draft ==
The draft for the league was held on 8 September 2022. 24 overseas players from nine countries were selected by teams along with 66 local players. The opening ceremony and first match of the tournament was held at the Gaddafi Stadium, Lahore on 6 October 2022. The 2022 PJL cost Rs. 997 million and incurred losses of US$4 million which caused the PJL to be dissolved by the newly appointed PCB management committee.

== Venues ==
All the matches of the PJL took place at Gaddafi Stadium in Lahore.

== League stage ==
=== Format ===
The six teams played 5 matches each and got 2 points for every win, none for a loss and 1 point for a no result. The top four teams in the group stage qualified for the play-offs.

A warm-up match was played between Hyderabad Hunters and Rawalpindi Raiders in which Hyderabad Hunters defeated Rawalpindi Raiders by 7 wickets.

=== Points table ===
Team	Pld	W	L	D	T	Pts	NRR
Gwadar Sharks (R)	5	4	1	0	0	8	1.231
Bahawalpur Royals (C)	5	3	2	0	0	6	0.821
Rawalpindi Raiders (4th)	5	3	2	0	0	6	-0.067
Mardan Warriors (3rd)	5	3	2	0	0	6	-0.429
Gujranwala Giants	5	2	3	0	0	4	-0.280
Hyderabad Hunters	5	0	5	0	0	0	-1.550

- The top 4 teams qualified for the Playoffs
- Advanced to Qualifier 1
- Advanced to Eliminator

=== League progression ===
	Round-robin stage					Knockout		
Team	1	2	3	4	5	Q1/E	Q2	F
Bahawalpur Royals	2	4	4	6	6	L	W	W
Gujranwala Giants	0	0	0	2	4			
Gwadar Sharks	2	4	6	6	8	W		L
Hyderabad Hunters	0	0	0	0	0			
Mardan Warriors	2	2	4	6	6	W	L	
Rawalpindi Raiders	0	2	4	4	6	L		

Won	Lost	No result

Note: The total points at the end of each group match are listed.
Note: Click on the points (group matches) or W/L (knockout) to see the match summary.

== Fixtures ==
The PCB confirmed the fixtures for the tournament.

Match 1
6 October 2022
18:00 (N)
Scorecard

Gujranwala Giants; 131/7 (20 over)	v	Mardan Warriors; 132/2 (16.5 overs)
Uzair Mumtaz 54 (47); Aimal Khan 3/15 (4 overs)		George Thomas 50 (32); Mohammad Ibtisam 1/22 (3.5)

Mardan Warriors won by 8 wickets
Gaddafi Stadium, Lahore
Umpires: Waleed Yaqub and Tariq Rasheed
Player of the match: George Thomas (Mardan Warriors)

- Mardan Warriors won the toss and elected to field.

Match 2
7 October 2022
18:00 (N)
Scorecard

Hyderabad Hunters; 113/10 (18.3 over)	v	Bahawalpur Royals; 117/2 (12.4 over)
Saad Baig 34 (24); Arham Nawab 3/15 (4 overs)		Basit Ali 54 (30); Haseeb-ur-Rehman 1/9 (2 Overs)

Bahawalpur Royals won by 8 wickets
Gaddafi Stadium, Lahore
Umpires: Imtiaz Iqbal and Aaley Haider
Player of the match: Arham Nawab (Bahawalpur Royals)

- Bahawalpur Royals won the toss and elected to field.

Match 3
8 October 2022
15:30
Scorecard

Rawalpindi Raiders; 116/10 (19 overs)	v	Gwadar Sharks; 150/5 (20 overs)
Aseer Mughal 26 (23); M. Shoaib 3/12 (4 overs)		Arafat Minhas 40(24); Afnan Khan 3/20 (4 overs)

Gwadar Sharks won by 34 runs.
Gaddafi Stadium, Lahore
Umpires: Waleed Yaqub and Imtiaz Iqbal
Player of the match: Arafat Minhas (Gwadar Sharks)

- Rawalpindi Raiders won the toss and elected to field.

Match 4
8 October 2022
20:00 (N)
Scorecard

Gujranwala Giants; 179/6 (20 overs)	v	Bahawalpur Royals; 180/5 (19.4 overs)
Shevon Daniel 81(51); Muhammad Zeeshan 2/25 (3 overs)		Basit Ali 102(58); Muhammad Shan 3/44 (4 overs)

Bahawalpur Royals won by 5 wickets
Gaddafi Stadium, Lahore
Umpires: Tariq Rasheed and Saqib Khan
Player of the match: Basit Ali (Bahawalpur Royals)

- Bahawalpur Royals won the toss and elected to field.

Match 5
9 October 2022
13:30
Scorecard

Hyderabad Hunters; 182/5 (20 overs)	v	Gwadar Sharks; 186/5 (19.5 overs)
Saad Baig 64(45); Saad Masood 3/26 (3 overs)		Shamyl Hussain 87(57); Muhammad Zubair Jr. 2/20 (2.5 overs)

Gwadar Sharks won by 5 wickets
Gaddafi Stadium, Lahore
Umpires: Imtiaz Iqbal and Waleed Yaqub
Player of the match: Shamyl Hussain (Gwadar Sharks)

- Gwadar Sharks won the toss and elected to field.

Match 6
9 October 2022
18:00 (N)
Scorecard

Rawalpindi Raiders; 134/5 (19.4 overs)	v	Mardan Warriors; 131/8 (20 overs)
Charlie Tear 34(27); Mohammad Nabeel 2/23 (4 overs)		Archie Lenham 31(37); Ziaullah 3/22 (4 overs)

Rawalpindi Raiders won by 5 wickets
Gaddafi Stadium, Lahore
Umpires: Saqib Khan and Aaley Haider
Player of the match: Charlie Tear (Rawalpindi Raiders)

- Rawalpindi Raiders won the toss and elected to field.

Match 7
10 October 2022
18:00 (N)
Scorecard

Bahawalpur Royals; 145/4 (20 overs)	v	Mardan Warriors; 147/5 (19.1 overs)
Ali Razzaq 44 (43); Abbas Ali 1/14 (1 over)		George Thomas 58 (39); Muhammad Zeeshan 2/17 (4 overs)

Mardan Warriors won by 5 wickets
Gaddafi Stadium, Lahore
Umpires: Nasir Hussain and Tariq Rasheed
Player of the match: George Thomas (Mardan Warriors)

- Mardan Warriors won the toss and elected to field.

Match 8
11 October 2022
18:00 (N)
Scorecard

Hyderabad Hunters; 40/8 (5 overs)	v	Rawalpindi Raiders; 125/4 (16 overs)
Ali Naseer 12 (5); Afnan Khan 3/7 (2 overs)		Hassan Eisakheil 52 (36); James Wood 1/9 (2 overs)

Rawalpindi Raiders won by 14 runs (D/L method)
Gaddafi Stadium, Lahore
Umpires: Saqib Khan and Aaley Haider
Player of the match: Afnan Khan (Rawalpindi Raiders)

- Rawalpindi Raiders won the toss and elected to bat.
- Rawalpindi Raiders innings was shortened due to a thunderstorm at the end of 16th over with the total 125/4 and Hyderabad Hunters given a target of 55 in 5 overs.

Match 9
12 October 2022
18:00 (N)
Scorecard

Gujranwala Giants; 87 (15.4 overs)	v	Gwadar Sharks; 131/10 (20 overs)
Arafat Minhas 37 (30); Mohammad Ibtisam 2/21 (4 overs)		Shavon Daniel 28 (26); Arafat Minhas 4/13 (2 overs)

Gwadar Sharks won by 44 runs
Gaddafi Stadium, Lahore
Umpires: Imran Javed and Nasir Hussain
Player of the match: Arafat Minhas (Gwadar Sharks)

- Gujranwala Giants won the toss and elected to field.

Match 10
13 October 2022
18:00 (N)
Scorecard

Mardan Warriors; 133/6 (19.2 overs)	v	Hyderabad Hunters; 128/6 (20 overs)
Haseebullah Khan 49* (39); Ali Naseer 3/41 (5 overs)		Ali Naseer 54* (37); Mohammad Irfan jr. 2/17 (4 overs)

Mardan Warriors won by 4 wickets
Gaddafi Stadium, Lahore
Umpires: Mohammad Asif and Imran Jawed
Player of the match: Haseebullah Khan (Mardan Warriors)

- Hyderabad Hunters won the toss and elected to bat

Match 11
14 October 2022
13:30
[ Scorecard]

Rawalpindi Raiders; 128 (19.3 overs)	v	Gujranwala Giants; 129/6 (18.1 overs)
Habibullah 55 (53); Matthew Tromp 3/19 (4 overs)		Uzair Mumtaz 56* (43); Ali Raza 2/25 (2 overs)

Gujranwala Giants won by 4 wickets
Gaddafi Stadium, Lahore
Umpires: Ghaffar Kazmi and Mohammad Asif
Player of the match: Uzair Mumtaz (Gujranwala Giants)

- Gujranwala Giants won the toss and elected to field.

Match 12
14 October 2022
18:00 (N)
Scorecard

Bahawalpur Royals; 122/2 (14.4 overs)	v	Gwadar Sharks; 119/8 (20 overs)
Shawaiz Irfan 51* (30); Arafat Minhas 1/15 (3 overs)		Haseeb Nazim 26 (23); Nangeyalia kharote 2/20 (4 overs)

Bahawalpur Royals won by 8 wickets
Gaddafi Stadium, Lahore
Umpires: Mohammad Asif and Mohammad Sajid
Player of the match: Mohammad Tayyab Arif (Bahawalpur Royals)

- Bahawalpur Royals won the toss and elected to field.

Match 13
15 October 2022
13:30 (N)
Scorecard

Hyderabad Hunters; 129/8 (20 overs)	v	Gujranwala Giants; 133/4 (16.2 overs)
Saad Baig 43 (44); Uzair Mumtaz 3/13 (3 overs)		Azan Awais 61 (43); Mohammad Zubair 2/26 (3 overs)

Gujranwala Giants won by 6 wickets
Gaddafi Stadium, Lahore
Umpires: Mohammad Asif and Imran Jawed
Player of the match: Azan Awais (Gujranwala Giants)

- Hyderabad Hunters won the toss and elected to bat.

Match 14
15 October 2022
18:00 (N)
[ Scorecard]

Bahawalpur Royals; 140/9 (20 overs)	v	Rawalpindi Raiders; 163/7 (20 overs)
Basit Ali Jnr. 44 (32); Aseer Mughal 3/19 (4 overs)		Habibullah 36 (23); Arham Nawab 2/24 (4 overs); Nathan Edwards 2/24 (4 overs)

Rawalpindi Raiders won by 23 runs.
Gaddafi Stadium, Lahore
Umpires: Ghaffar Kazmi and Shozab Raza
Player of the match: Ziaullah (Rawalpindi Raiders)

- Bahawalpur Royals won the toss and elected to field.

Match 15
16 October 2022
18:00 (N)
Scorecard

Mardan Warriors; 100 (16.3 overs)	v	Gwadar Sharks; 177/9 (20 overs)
Burhan Niaz 47 (42); Saad Masood 5/6 (2.3 overs)		Luc Benkenstein 74 (46); Mohammad Irfan Jnr. 3/29 (4 overs)

Gwadar Sharks won by 77 runs.
Gaddafi Stadium, Lahore
Umpires: Imran Jawed and Mohammad Sajid
Player of the match: Luc Benkenstein (Gwadar Sharks)

- Mardan Warriors won the toss and elected to field.

== Playoffs ==
Qualifier 1
18 October — Lahore
1	Gwadar Sharks	141/2 (18.2 overs)
2	Bahawalpur Royals	139/7 (20 overs)
Eliminator
19 October — Lahore
3	Rawalpindi Raiders	121 (19.3 overs)
4	Mardan Warriors	122/4 (18.4 overs)

Qualifier 2
20 October — Lahore
2	Bahawalpur Royals	133/1 (14.5 overs)
4	Mardan Warriors	132/9 (20 overs)

Final
21 October — Lahore
1	Gwadar Sharks	139 (15.1 overs)
2	Bahawalpur Royals	225/3 (20 overs)

=== Qualifier 1 ===
Match 16
18 October 2022
18:00 (N)
Scorecard

Gwadar Sharks; 141/2 (18.2 overs)	v	Bahawalpur Royals; 139/7 (20 overs)
Luc Benkenstein 71 (37); Nathan Edward 1/18 (4 overs)		Danish Mohammad 33 (31); Mohammad Ismail 3/14 (4 overs)

Gwadar Sharks won by 8 wickets
Gaddafi Stadium, Lahore
Umpires: Asif Yaqoob and Faisal Afridi
Player of the match: Luc Benkenstein (Gwadar Sharks)

- Gwadar Sharks won the toss and elected to field.

=== Eliminator ===
Match 17
19 October 2022
18:00 (N)
Scorecard

Rawalpindi Raiders; 121 (19.3 overs)	v	Mardan Warriors; 122/4 (18.4 overs)
Habibullah 65 (51); Abidullah 3/17 (overs)		Shahzaib Khan 35 (32); Hassan Eisakhil 1/13 (1.4 overs)

Mardan Warriors won by 6 wickets
Gaddafi Stadium, Lahore
Umpires: Rashid Riaz and Shozab Raza
Player of the match: Abidullah (Mardan Warriors)

- Rawalpindi Raiders won the toss and elected to bat.

=== Qualifier 2 ===
Match 18
20 October 2022
18:00 (N)
Scorecard

Bahawalpur Royals; 133/1 (14.5 overs)	v	Mardan Warriors; 132/9 (20 overs)
Basit Ali 91* (55); Mohammad Nabeel 1/34 (3 overs)		Shahzaib Khan 32 (36); Arham Nawab 2/21 (4 overs)

Bahawalpur Royals won by 9 wickets
Gaddafi Stadium, Lahore
Umpires: Asif Yaqoob and Rashid Riaz
Player of the match: Basit Ali (Bahawalpur Royals)

- Bahawalpur Royals won the toss and elected to field.

== Final ==
Match 19
21 October 2022
18:00 (N)
Scorecard

Gwadar Sharks; 139 (15.1 overs)	v	Bahawalpur Royals; 225/3 (20 overs)
Shamyl Hussain 67 (34); Mohammad Zeeshan 3/27 (3.1 overs)		Shawaiz Irfan 79 (32); Momin Qamar 2/34 (4 overs)

Bahawalpur Royals won by 86 runs
Gaddafi Stadium, Lahore
Umpires: Asif Yaqoob and Rashid Riaz
Player of the match: Shawaiz Irfan (Bahawalpur Royals)

- Gwadar Sharks won the toss and elected to field.
- Bahawalpur Royals won the 2022 Pakistan Junior League

== Team of the tournament ==
- Basit Ali
- Tayyab Arif
- Shevon Daniel
- Luc Benkenstein
- Haseeb Khan
- Arafat Minhas (c)
- Arham Nawab
- Abidullah
- Shawaiz Irfan (wk)
- Mohammad Zeeshan
- Mohammad Ismail
- Matthew Tromp (12th man)

== Results ==
The only champions were Bahawalpur Royals, who defeated Gwadar Sharks in the final.

== See also ==
- Pakistan Blind Cricket Council
- Pakistan Super League
- Babar Azam
- Imran Khan
