= 2026–27 Pakistan ODI Tri-Series =

International cricket tour

- Date: 18–31 October 2026
- Location: Pakistan
- Result: Pakistan won the series
- Player of the series: Arafat Minhas (Pak)
- Matches: 7
Teams
England	Pakistan	Sri Lanka
Captains
Harry Brook	Shaheen Shah Afridi	Kusal Mendis
Most runs
Ben Duckett (346)	Saad Baig (185); Hassan Nawaz (185)	Pavan Rathnayake (427)
Most wickets
Liam Dawson (7)	Shaheen Shah Afridi (10)	Dilshan Madushanka (11)

The 2026–27 Pakistan ODI Tri-Series was a cricket tournament that took place in Pakistan in October 2026. It was a tri-nation series being contested by the men's national teams of England, Pakistan and Sri Lanka. In August 2026, the Pakistan Cricket Board (PCB) confirmed the fixtures for the tri-series. The series provided all 3 teams with the preparations for the 2027 Cricket World Cup.

== Squads ==
England	Pakistan	Sri Lanka
Harry Brook (c); Gus Atkinson; Sonny Baker; Tom Banton; James Coles; Jordan Cox (wk); Mason Crane; Henry Crocombe; Sam Curran; Liam Dawson; Ben Duckett; Will Jacks; Jamie Overton; Adil Rashid; Joe Root; Josh Tongue	Shaheen Shah Afridi (c); Abrar Ahmed; Salman Ali Agha; Faheem Ashraf; Saim Ayub (Note: After the 4th ODI Saim Ayub was released from the squad and Sahibzada Farhan was named as his replacement.); Babar Azam; Saad Baig (wk); Sahibzada Farhan; Ghazi Ghori (wk); Shadab Khan; Razaullah Mashwani; Arafat Minhas; ~~Sufyan Moqim~~ (Note: Ahead of the 4th ODI Sufyan Moqim was released from the squad and Maaz Sadaqat was named as his replacement.); Hasan Nawaz; Haris Rauf; Maaz Sadaqat; Naseem Shah; Fakhar Zaman	Kusal Mendis (c, wk); Sahan Arachchige; Dushmantha Chameera; Sachindu Colombage; Asitha Fernando; Avishka Fernando; Janith Liyanage; Dilshan Madushanka; Eshan Malinga; Kamindu Mendis; Kamil Mishara (wk); ~~Pathum Nissanka~~ (Note: Pathum Nissanka was replaced by Lahiru Udara in Sri Lanka's squad due to a hamstring injury.); Pavan Rathnayake; Dasun Shanaka; Maheesh Theekshana; Lahiru Udara (wk); Dunith Wellalage

== Round robin ==
=== Points table ===
Pos	Team	Pld	W	L	NR	Pts	NRR	Qualification
1	Pakistan (H)	4	3	1	0	6	−0.114	Advanced to the final
2	Sri Lanka	4	2	2	0	4	0.654	Advanced to the final
3	England	4	1	3	0	2	−0.274	

Source: Cricinfo
(H) Host

=== Fixtures ===
==== 1st ODI ====
18 October 2026
13:00 (D/N)
Scorecard

Pakistan; 305 (49.5 overs)	v	Sri Lanka; 268 (48.1 overs)
Salman Ali Agha 107 (90); Eshan Malinga 4/46 (9.5 overs)		Pavan Rathnayake 79 (74); Shaheen Shah Afridi 3/55 (10 overs)

Pakistan won by 37 runs
Rawalpindi Cricket Stadium, Rawalpindi
Umpires: Wayne Knights (NZ) and Asif Yaqoob (Pak)
Player of the match: Salman Ali Agha (Pak)

- Sri Lanka won the toss and elected to field.
- Saad Baig (Pak) made his ODI debut.

==== 2nd ODI ====
20 October 2026
13:00 (D/N)
Scorecard

Pakistan; 302/9 (50 overs)	v	England; 215 (38.4 overs)
Hassan Nawaz 79 (74); Sonny Baker 3/65 (9 overs)		Tom Banton 57 (53); Arafat Minhas 6/40 (8.4 overs)

Pakistan won by 87 runs
Rawalpindi Cricket Stadium, Rawalpindi
Umpires: Faisal Afridi (Pak) and Sharfuddoula (Ban)
Player of the match: Arafat Minhas (Pak)

- England won the toss and elected to field.

==== 3rd ODI ====
22 October 2026
13:00 (D/N)
Scorecard

England; 429/4 (50 overs)	v	Sri Lanka; 430/8 (49.5 overs)
Harry Brook 202 (116); Dunith Wellalage 2/56 (10 overs)		Pavan Rathnayake 130 (106); Josh Tongue 3/79 (8.5 overs)

Sri Lanka won by 2 wickets
Rawalpindi Cricket Stadium, Rawalpindi
Umpires: Wayne Knights (NZ) and Asif Yaqoob (Pak)
Player of the match: Pavan Rathnayake (SL)

- Sri Lanka won the toss and elected to field.
- Joe Root (Eng) scored his 8,000th run in ODIs.
- Harry Brook (Eng) scored his maiden double century in ODIs. Brook's double century was the fastest in terms of balls faced (114) in ODIs. He also became the first English batter to score a double century in ODIs.
- This was Sri Lanka's highest successful run-chase in ODIs.
- This was also the second highest successful run-chase in ODIs.

==== 4th ODI ====
25 October 2026
13:00 (D/N)
Scorecard

England; 241 (46.4 overs)	v	Pakistan; 243/9 (47.1 overs)
Ben Duckett 105 (111); Shaheen Shah Afridi 4/46 (8.4 overs)		Shadab Khan 113* (96); Jamie Overton 3/43 (10 overs)

Pakistan won by 1 wicket
Gaddafi Stadium, Lahore
Umpires: Sharfuddoula (Ban) and Rashid Riaz (Pak)
Player of the match: Shadab Khan (Pak)

- Pakistan won the toss and elected to field.
- Razaullah (Pak) and Henry Crocombe (Eng) both made their ODI debuts.
- Shaheen Shah Afridi (Pak) took his 150th wicket in ODIs.
- Shadab Khan (Pak) scored his maiden century and completed 1,000 runs in ODIs.

==== 5th ODI ====
27 October 2026
13:00 (D/N)
Scorecard

Pakistan; 110 (25.3 overs)	v	Sri Lanka; 114/2 (18.1 overs)
Babar Azam 29 (33); Dilshan Madushanka 5/34 (8.3 overs)		Kamindu Mendis 62* (60); Arafat Minhas 1/23 (5 overs)

Sri Lanka won by 8 wickets
Gaddafi Stadium, Lahore
Umpires: Nasir Hussain (Pak) and Wayne Knights (NZ)
Player of the match: Dilshan Madushanka (SL)

- Sri Lanka won the toss and elected to field.

==== 6th ODI ====
29 October 2026
13:00 (D/N)
Scorecard

England; 386/5 (50 overs)	v	Sri Lanka; 331 (45.1 overs)
Ben Duckett 167 (132); Asitha Fernando 2/63 (10 overs)		Pavan Rathnayake 118 (77); Liam Dawson 4/49 (10 overs)

England won by 55 runs
Gaddafi Stadium, Lahore
Umpires: Ahsan Raza (Pak) and Sharfuddoula (Ban)
Player of the match: Ben Duckett (Eng)

- Sri Lanka won the toss and elected to field.

== Final ==
31 October 2026
13:00 (D/N)
Scorecard

Sri Lanka; 325/8 (50 overs)	v	Pakistan; 331/7 (48.3 overs)
Kamindu Mendis 131 (128); Salman Ali Agha 2/44 (7 overs)		Fakhar Zaman 127 (99); Dilshan Madushanka 3/63 (9.3 overs)

Pakistan won by 3 wickets
Gaddafi Stadium, Lahore
Umpires: Wayne Knights (NZ) and Ahsan Raza (Pak)
Player of the match: Fakhar Zaman (Pak)

- Pakistan won the toss and elected to field.
- Kamindu Mendis (SL) scored his maiden century in ODIs.
