= Pakistani cricket team in South Africa in 2024–25 =

International cricket tour

	South Africa	Pakistan
- Dates: 10 December 2024 – 7 January 2025
Captains	Temba Bavuma (Tests & ODIs) (Note: Aiden Markram captained South Africa in the 1st ODI.); Heinrich Klaasen (T20Is)	Shan Masood (Tests); Mohammad Rizwan (ODIs & T20Is)

Test series
- Result: South Africa won the 2-match series 2–0
Most runs	Ryan Rickelton (267)	Babar Azam (193)
Most wickets	Marco Jansen (10)	Mohammad Abbas (10)
- Player of the series: Marco Jansen (SA)

One Day International series
- Results: Pakistan won the 3-match series 3–0
Most runs	Heinrich Klaasen (264)	Saim Ayub (235)
Most wickets	Marco Jansen (6)	Shaheen Afridi (7)
- Player of the series: Saim Ayub (Pak)

Twenty20 International series
- Results: South Africa won the 3-match series 2–0
Most runs	Reeza Hendricks (125)	Saim Ayub (129)
Most wickets	George Linde (5)	Abrar Ahmed (3); Abbas Afridi (3); Shaheen Afridi (3)

The Pakistan cricket team toured South Africa in December 2024 and January 2025 to play the South Africa cricket team. The tour consisted of two Tests, three One Day Internationals (ODI) and three Twenty20 International (T20I) matches. The Test series formed part of the 2023–2025 ICC World Test Championship. In May 2024, the Cricket South Africa (CSA) confirmed the fixtures for the tour, as a part of the 2024–25 home international season.

== Squads ==
South Africa			Pakistan		
Tests	ODIs	T20Is	Tests	ODIs	T20Is
Temba Bavuma (c); David Bedingham; Corbin Bosch; Matthew Breetzke; Tony de Zorzi; Marco Jansen; Keshav Maharaj; Kwena Maphaka; Aiden Markram; Wiaan Mulder; Senuran Muthusamy; Dane Paterson; Kagiso Rabada; Ryan Rickelton; Tristan Stubbs; Kyle Verreynne (wk)	Temba Bavuma (c); Ottniel Baartman; Corbin Bosch; Tony de Zorzi; Bjorn Fortuin; Marco Jansen; Heinrich Klaasen (wk); ~~Keshav Maharaj~~; Kwena Maphaka; Aiden Markram; David Miller; Andile Phehlukwayo; Kagiso Rabada; Ryan Rickelton (wk); Tabraiz Shamsi; Tristan Stubbs (wk); Rassie van der Dussen	Heinrich Klaasen (c, wk); Ottniel Baartman; Matthew Breetzke; Donovan Ferreira; Dayyaan Galiem; Reeza Hendricks; Patrick Kruger; George Linde; Kwena Maphaka; David Miller; ~~Anrich Nortje~~; Nqaba Peter; Ryan Rickelton (wk); Tabraiz Shamsi; Andile Simelane; Rassie van der Dussen	Shan Masood (c); Saud Shakeel (vc); Mohammad Abbas; Noman Ali; Salman Ali Agha; Saim Ayub; Babar Azam; Kamran Ghulam; Mir Hamza; Aamir Jamal; Haseebullah Khan (wk); Mohammad Rizwan (wk); Abdullah Shafique; Khurram Shahzad; Naseem Shah	Mohammad Rizwan (c, wk); Abrar Ahmed; Salman Ali Agha; Shaheen Afridi; Saim Ayub; Babar Azam; Kamran Ghulam; Mohammad Hasnain; Usman Khan (wk); Irfan Khan Niazi; Sufiyan Muqeem; Haris Rauf; Abdullah Shafique; Naseem Shah; Tayyab Tahir	Mohammad Rizwan (c, wk); Abrar Ahmed; Salman Ali Agha; Abbas Afridi; Shaheen Afridi; Saim Ayub; Babar Azam; Mohammad Hasnain; Jahandad Khan; Usman Khan (wk); Irfan Khan Niazi; Sufiyan Muqeem; Haris Rauf; Tayyab Tahir; Omair Yousuf

On 12 December, Anrich Nortje was ruled out of the T20I series due to a toe injury, with Dayyaan Galiem named as his replacement. On 19 December, Keshav Maharaj was ruled out of the ODI series due to a left adductor strain, with Bjorn Fortuin named as his replacement. On 20 December, Ottniel Baartman was ruled out of the third ODI due to right knee injury with Corbin Bosch named as his replacement.

== T20I series ==
=== 1st T20I ===
10 December 2024
18:00 (N)
Scorecard

South Africa; 183/9 (20 overs)	v	Pakistan; 172/8 (20 overs)
David Miller 82 (40); Shaheen Afridi 3/22 (4 overs)		Mohammad Rizwan 74 (62); George Linde 4/21 (4 overs)

South Africa won by 11 runs
Kingsmead Cricket Ground, Durban
Umpires: Stephen Harris (SA) and Allahudien Paleker (SA)
Player of the match: George Linde (SA)

- South Africa won the toss and elected to bat.
- Shaheen Afridi (Pak) took his 100th wicket in T20Is.

=== 2nd T20I ===
13 December 2024
18:00 (N)
Scorecard

Pakistan; 206/5 (20 overs)	v	South Africa; 210/3 (19.3 overs)
Saim Ayub 98* (57); Dayyaan Galiem 2/21 (4 overs)		Reeza Hendricks 117 (63); Jahandad Khan 2/40 (4 overs)

South Africa won by 7 wickets
Centurion Park, Centurion
Umpires: Lubabalo Gcuma (SA) and Arno Jacobs (SA)
Player of the match: Reeza Hendricks (SA)

- Pakistan won the toss and elected to bat.
- Dayyaan Galiem (SA) made his T20I debut.
- Reeza Hendricks (SA) scored his first century in T20Is.
- Heinrich Klaasen (SA) scored his 1,000th run in T20Is. This was also Klaasen's last T20I before his retirement announcement.

=== 3rd T20I ===
14 December 2024
18:00 (N)
Scorecard

South Africa	v	Pakistan

Match abandoned
Wanderers Stadium, Johannesburg
Umpires: Lubabalo Gcuma (SA) and Allahudien Paleker (SA)

- No toss.
- No play was possible due to rain.

== ODI series ==
=== 1st ODI ===
17 December 2024
14:00 (D/N)
Scorecard

South Africa; 239/9 (50 overs)	v	Pakistan; 242/7 (49.3 overs)
Heinrich Klaasen 86 (97); Salman Ali Agha 4/32 (8 overs)		Saim Ayub 109 (119); Ottniel Baartman 2/37 (7 overs)

Pakistan won by 3 wickets
Boland Park, Paarl
Umpires: Nitin Menon (Ind) and Allahudien Paleker (SA)
Player of the match: Salman Ali Agha (Pak)

- South Africa won the toss and elected to bat.

=== 2nd ODI ===
19 December 2024
14:00 (D/N)
Scorecard

Pakistan; 329 (49.5 overs)	v	South Africa; 248 (43.1 overs)
Mohammad Rizwan 80 (82); Kwena Maphaka 4/72 (9.5 overs)		Heinrich Klaasen 97 (74); Shaheen Afridi 4/47 (8 overs)

Pakistan won by 81 runs
Newlands Cricket Ground, Cape Town
Umpires: Lubabalo Gcuma (SA) and Alex Wharf (Eng)
Player of the match: Kamran Ghulam (Pak)

- South Africa won the toss and elected to field.
- Kwena Maphaka (SA) made his ODI debut.

=== 3rd ODI ===
22 December 2024
14:00 (D/N)
Scorecard

Pakistan; 308/9 (47 overs)	v	South Africa; 271 (42 overs)
Saim Ayub 101 (94); Kagiso Rabada 3/56 (10 overs)		Heinrich Klaasen 81 (43); Sufiyan Muqeem 4/52 (8 overs)

Pakistan won by 36 runs (DLS method)
Wanderers Stadium, Johannesburg
Umpires: Nitin Menon (Ind) and Allahudien Paleker (SA)
Player of the match: Saim Ayub (Pak)

- South Africa won the toss and elected to field.
- The match was reduced to 47 overs per side due to rain.
- South Africa were set a revised target of 308 runs from 47 overs.
- Corbin Bosch (SA) and Sufiyan Muqeem (Pak) both made their ODI debuts.
- Pakistan become the first team to whitewash South Africa at their home.

== Test series ==
=== 1st Test ===
26–29 December 2024
Scorecard

Pakistan	v	South Africa
211 (57.3 overs); Kamran Ghulam 54 (71); Dane Paterson 5/61 (16 overs)		301 (73.4 overs); Aiden Markram 89 (144); Khurram Shahzad 3/75 (20 overs)
237 (59.4 overs); Saud Shakeel 84 (113); Marco Jansen 6/52 (14 overs)		150/8 (39.3 overs); Temba Bavuma 40 (78); Mohammad Abbas 6/54 (19.3 overs)

South Africa won by 2 wickets
Centurion Park, Centurion
Umpires: Nitin Menon (Ind) and Alex Wharf (Eng)
Player of the match: Aiden Markram (SA)

- South Africa won the toss and elected to field.
- No play was possible before lunch on Day 3 due to rain.
- Corbin Bosch (SA) made his Test debut, and became the 25th cricketer to take a wicket with his first ball in Tests.
- Babar Azam (Pak) scored his 4,000th run in Tests.
- Kagiso Rabada (SA) scored his 1,000th run in Tests.
- South Africa qualified in the World Test Championship final for the first time.
- World Test Championship points: South Africa 12, Pakistan 0.

=== 2nd Test ===
3–6 January 2025
Scorecard

South Africa	v	Pakistan
615 (141.3 overs); Ryan Rickelton 259 (343); Mohammad Abbas 3/94 (27.3 overs)		194 (54.2 overs); Babar Azam 58 (127); Kagiso Rabada 3/55 (15 overs)
61/0 (7.1 overs); David Bedingham 44* (30)		478 (122.1 overs) (f/o); Shan Masood 145 (251); Kagiso Rabada 3/115 (25.1 overs)

South Africa won by 10 wickets
Newlands Cricket Ground, Cape Town
Umpires: Kumar Dharmasena (SL) and Nitin Menon (Ind)
Player of the match: Ryan Rickelton (SA)

- South Africa won the toss and elected to bat.
- Kwena Maphaka (SA) made his Test debut.
- Ryan Rickelton (SA) scored his first double century in Tests.
- World Test Championship points: South Africa 12, Pakistan –5.
