= Pakistani cricket team in Sri Lanka in 2022 =

International cricket tour

Pakistani cricket team in the Sri Lanka in 2022
	Sri Lanka	Pakistan
- Dates: 16 – 28 July 2022
Captains	Dimuth Karunaratne	Babar Azam

Test series
- Result: 2-match series drawn 1–1
Most runs	Dinesh Chandimal (271)	Babar Azam (271)
Most wickets	Prabath Jayasuriya (17)	Mohammad Nawaz (10)
- Player of the series: Prabath Jayasuriya (SL)

The Pakistan cricket team toured Sri Lanka in July 2022 to play two Test matches against the Sri Lankan cricket team. The Test series formed part of the 2021–2023 ICC World Test Championship. In April 2022, the Pakistan Cricket Board (PCB) confirmed that the series would be taking place. Originally, the tour was also going to include three One Day International (ODI) matches, but these were cancelled in May 2022, as they were not part of the 2020–2023 ICC Cricket World Cup Super League. The fixtures for the tour were confirmed in June 2022. Pakistan last toured Sri Lanka for a Test series in June and July 2015. On 17 July 2022, Sri Lanka Cricket moved the second Test from the R. Premadasa Stadium in Colombo to the Galle International Stadium due to the economic crisis in the country.

Pakistan won the first Test by four wickets after they were set a target of 342 runs to win the match. It was Pakistan's second-highest successful run chase in Test cricket, and the highest successful run chase for any team playing a Test in Galle. Sri Lanka won the second Test by 246 runs to draw the series 1–1, with Dhananjaya de Silva scoring a century. Player of the series Prabath Jayasuriya took his fourth five-wicket haul in six innings.

== Squads ==
Tests
Sri Lanka	Pakistan
Dimuth Karunaratne (c); Dinesh Chandimal; Dhananjaya de Silva; Niroshan Dickwella (wk); Asitha Fernando; Oshada Fernando; Vishwa Fernando; Prabath Jayasuriya; Dilshan Madushanka; Lakshitha Manasinghe; Angelo Mathews; Kamindu Mendis; Kusal Mendis; Ramesh Mendis; Pathum Nissanka; Kasun Rajitha; Maheesh Theekshana; Jeffrey Vandersay; Dunith Wellalage	Babar Azam (c); Mohammad Rizwan (vc, wk); Shaheen Afridi; Sarfaraz Ahmed (wk); Azhar Ali; Hasan Ali; Nauman Ali; Fawad Alam; Faheem Ashraf; Shan Masood; Mohammad Nawaz; Haris Rauf; Agha Salman; Abdullah Shafique; Naseem Shah; Yasir Shah; Saud Shakeel; Imam-ul-Haq

Lakshitha Manasinghe was added to Sri Lanka's squad for the second Test, replacing Maheesh Theekshana who suffered a finger injury in the first Test. Pakistan's Shaheen Afridi was ruled out of the second Test after he picked up a knee injury in the first Test.

== Warm-up match ==
11–13 July 2022
Scorecard

Pakistan	v	Sri Lanka Cricket XI
323 (100 overs); Babar Azam 88 (113); Lakshitha Manasinghe 4/85 (24 overs)		375/8d (99 overs); Sadeera Samarawickrama 91 (99); Mohammad Nawaz 2/24 (10 overs)
178/2 (50 overs); Abdullah Shafique 63 (111); Lakshitha Manasinghe 1/50 (13 overs)

Match drawn
Colts Cricket Club Ground, Colombo
Umpires: Keerthi Bandara (SL) and Deepal Gunawardene (SL)

- Pakistan won the toss and elected to bat.

== Test series ==
=== 1st Test ===
16–20 July 2022
Scorecard

Sri Lanka	v	Pakistan
222 (66.1 overs); Dinesh Chandimal 76 (115); Shaheen Afridi 4/58 (14.1 overs)		218 (90.5 overs); Babar Azam 119 (244); Prabath Jayasuriya 5/82 (39 overs)
337 (100 overs); Dinesh Chandimal 94* (139); Mohammad Nawaz 5/88 (28 overs)		344/6 (127.2 overs); Abdullah Shafique 160* (408); Prabath Jayasuriya 4/135 (56.2 overs)

Pakistan won by 4 wickets
Galle International Stadium, Galle
Umpires: Kumar Dharmasena (SL) and Marais Erasmus (SA)
Player of the match: Abdullah Shafique (Pak)

- Sri Lanka won the toss and elected to bat.
- Agha Salman (Pak) made his Test debut.
- Babar Azam became the fastest batter for Pakistan to score 10,000 runs in international cricket, doing so in his 228th innings.
- Mohammad Nawaz (Pak) took his first five-wicket haul in Tests.
- Babar Azam (Pak) scored his 3,000th run in Tests.
- World Test Championship points: Pakistan 12, Sri Lanka 0.

=== 2nd Test ===
24–28 July 2022
Scorecard

Sri Lanka	v	Pakistan
378 (103 overs); Dinesh Chandimal 80 (137); Naseem Shah 3/58 (18 overs)		231 (88.1 overs); Agha Salman 62 (126); Ramesh Mendis 5/47 (21.1 overs)
360/8d (91.5 overs); Dhananjaya de Silva 109 (171); Naseem Shah 2/44 (12.5 overs)		261 (77 overs); Babar Azam 81 (146); Prabath Jayasuriya 5/117 (32 overs)

Sri Lanka won by 246 runs
Galle International Stadium, Galle
Umpires: Kumar Dharmasena (SL) and Rod Tucker (Aus)
Player of the match: Dhananjaya de Silva (SL)

- Sri Lanka won the toss and elected to bat.
- Dunith Wellalage (SL) made his Test debut.
- Angelo Mathews (SL) played in his 100th Test.
- Dimuth Karunaratne scored his 6,000th run in Tests.
- World Test Championship points: Sri Lanka 12, Pakistan 0.
