= Razaullah Mashwani =

Pakistani cricketer (born 2005)

Razaullah
- Razaullah in 2026

Personal information
- Full name: Razaullah
- Born: 5 April 2005 (age 21); Nihag, Upper Dir, Khyber Pakhtunkhwa, Pakistan
- Batting: Right-handed
- Bowling: Right-arm fast
- Role: Bowler

International information
- National side: Pakistan (2026–present)
- Test debut (cap 268): 9 September 2026 v England
- Only ODI: 25 October 2026 v England
- ODI shirt no.: 6
- T20I debut: 9 October 2026 v Sri Lanka
- Last T20I: 13 October 2026 v Sri Lanka
- T20I shirt no.: 6

Domestic team information
- Years: Team
- 2025: Peshawar
- 2025: Sahir Associates
- 2026: Abbottabad
- 2026: Rawalpindiz

Career statistics
| Competition | Test | ODI | T20I | FC |
|---|---|---|---|---|
| Matches | 1 | 1 | 2 | 10 |
| Runs scored | 92 | 8 | 0 | 452 |
| Batting average | 46.00 | 8.00 | 00.00 | 28.25 |
| 100s/50s | 0/1 | 0/0 | 0/0 | 1/2 |
| Top score | 81 | 8 | 0 | 100 |
| Balls bowled | 168 | 48 | 37 | 1,460 |
| Wickets | 4 | 2 | 1 | 36 |
| Bowling average | 46.75 | 19.00 | 66.00 | 25.47 |
| 5 wickets in innings | 0 | 0 | 0 | 3 |
| 10 wickets in match | 0 | 0 | 0 | 0 |
| Best bowling | 4/148 | 2/38 | 1/29 | 5/37 |
| Catches/stumpings | 1/– | 1/– | 2/– | 6/– |
- Source: Cricinfo, 12 September 2026

Razaullah (Note: Urdu: رضا اللہ) (born 5 April 2005) is a Pakistani professional cricket right-arm fast bowler who plays for the Pakistan national team. He represents Peshawar in domestic cricket and Rawalpindiz in the Pakistan Super League.

== Early life and family ==
Razaullah Mashwani was born on 5 April 2005 in the town of Nihag in Upper Dir District (now Central Dir District), Khyber Pakhtunkhwa, Pakistan, into a Pashtun family of the Mashwani tribe. He grew up playing cricket in Mardan where his father Yar Muhammad Mashwani was posted since 2007. Razaullah has an elder brother named Muhammad Iqbal Mashwani. Razaullah considered Shoaib Akhtar as his role-model and initially requested a number 14 jersey as a tribute to him.

== Domestic career ==
Razaullah joined the Akmal Khan Cricket Academy in Mardan during the 2022–23 season. He played cricket at the inter-district level before being selected for the Abbottabad Region under-19 team.

Razaullah made his domestic career debut for Peshawar in the 2025–26 Quaid-e-Azam Trophy. He took 30 wickets in the tournament and also scored a century in one of the matches.

== International career ==
In August 2026, he was named in the Pakistan cricket team squad for the away tour of England. He made his Test debut on 9 September 2026, against England in Edgbaston, Birmingham. He took four wickets in the first innings. He was noted for his pace, consistently hitting the 90 mph (145 kmh) mark, and since 2010 only Mark Wood, Jofra Archer, Dale Steyn, Anrich Nortje and Shannon Gabriel had bowled faster spells in England. During the match, Razaullah hit his maiden Test half century off just 43 balls, batting at number 9 against England. He eventually scored 81 runs off 63 balls while hitting 9 sixes - the most sixes by a No. 9 batter in a Test innings. He equalled Tim Southee's record for most sixes by a debutant in a Test innings while also equalling Ben Stokes' record for most sixes in a Test innings in England.

In October 2026, he was named in the 16-member squad for the home ODI tri-series involving England and Sri Lanka. On 25 October 2026, Razaullah took two wickets on his One Day International debut in the second match against England at the Gaddafi Stadium in Lahore.

In November 2026, during the opening session of the second Test against Sri Lanka at Rawalpindi, Razaullah was noted for his spell of fast bowling that helped dismiss the visitors for 98, the lowest first-innings Test total recorded at the venue. Coming on as a change bowler, he consistently bowled above 143 km/h (89 mph) during his first two overs while maintaining accuracy, ultimately taking three wickets in rapid succession and leaving Sri Lanka five wickets down by the 18th over.

== Playing style ==
Razaullah's bowling has been compared to Waqar Younis' primarily because of his distinctive, slingy, chest-on/side-on bowling action, raw high pace (operating around 145 km/h), and a release point close to the stumps that brings the leg-before-wicket (LBW) threat into play.
