= 2026 Caribbean Premier League final =

Twenty20 cricket match

- Event: 2026 Caribbean Premier League
Jamaica Kingsmen	Antigua & Barbuda Falcons
170/9	173/2
(20 overs)	(16.4 overs)
- Antigua & Barbuda Falcons won by 8 wickets
- Date: 20 September 2026 19:30 UTC−4
- Venue: Kensington Oval, Bridgetown, Barbados
- Player of the match: Sufyan Moqim (Antigua & Barbuda Falcons)
- Umpires: Zahid Bassarath (WI) and Deighton Butler (WI)

The 2026 Caribbean Premier League final was a Twenty20 cricket match played at Kensington Oval in Bridgetown, Barbados on 20 September 2026 to determine the winner of the 2026 Caribbean Premier League. It was played between the Antigua & Barbuda Falcons and Jamaica Kingsmen.

Antigua & Barbuda Falcons won the toss and elected to field first; Jamaica Kingsmen managed to score 170/9 in their innings. In the second innings, Antigua & Barbuda Falcons chased down the target in 16.4 overs to win their first title.

== Background ==
In August 2025, it was reported that the tournament would feature an expanded roster of seven teams following the return of a Jamaica-based franchise. In February 2026, it was confirmed that the tournament would return to Jamaica, ending a seven-year absence of the league from the island. In March 2026, it was announced that the Jamaica Kingsmen will officially participate in the 2026 edition. In May 2026, it was also announced that the Barbados Tridents will return for the 2026 season as part of an ambitious "One Barbados" initiative.

== Match ==
=== Match officials ===
- On-field umpires: Zahid Bassarath (WI) and Deighton Butler (WI)
- Third umpire: Leslie Reifer (WI)
- Reserve umpire: Christopher Taylor (WI)
- Match referee: Reon King (WI)
- Toss: Antigua & Barbuda Falcons won the toss and elected to field.

=== Scorecard ===
Final
20 September 2026
19:00 (N)
Scorecard

Jamaica Kingsmen; 170/9 (20 overs)	v	Antigua & Barbuda Falcons; 173/2 (16.4 overs)
Maaz Sadaqat 114 (58); Sufyan Moqim 4/14 (4 overs)		Amir Jangoo 57 (34); Vitel Lawes 1/32 (4 overs)

Antigua & Barbuda Falcons won by 8 wickets
Kensington Oval, Barbados
Umpires: Zahid Bassarath (WI) and Deighton Butler (WI)
Player of the match: Sufyan Moqim (Antigua & Barbuda Falcons)

- Antigua & Barbuda Falcons won the toss and elected to field.
