= Mohammad Imran Randhawa =

Pakistani cricketer (born 1996)

Personal information
- Full name: Mohammad Imran Randhawa
- Born: 25 December 1996 (age 29); Khanewal, Punjab, Pakistan
- Batting: Right-handed
- Bowling: Right-arm medium
- Role: All-rounder

International information
- National side: Pakistan (2026–present)
- Only Test (cap 267): 9 September 2026 v England

Domestic team information
- Years: Team
- 2015/16–2025/26: Bahawalpur
- 2015/16–2018/19: Sui Northern Gas Pipelines Limited
- 2016/17: Federally Administered Tribal Areas
- 2017/18: Peshawar
- 2017/18: Faisalabad
- 2018: Punjab
- 2020/21–2022/23: Southern Punjab
- 2020/21: Peshawar Zalmi
- 2022/23: Dhaka Dominators
- 2023/24: Multan
- 2023/24: State Bank of Pakistan
- 2025/26: Oil and Gas Development Company Limited
- 2025/26: Multan Sultans

Career statistics
Competition	Test	FC	LA	T20
Matches	1	59	85	70
Runs scored	9	2,264	995	803
Batting average	4.50	26.02	16.86	19.11
100s/50s	0/0	2/10	0/3	0/4
Top score	5	179	71*	80
Balls bowled	122	6,636	2,875	1,109
Wickets	2	112	82	46
Bowling average	35.50	34.84	33.24	32.89
5 wickets in innings	0	4	0	0
10 wickets in match	0	0	0	0
Best bowling	2/47	6/28	4/38	2/17
Catches/stumpings	0/–	22/–	25/–	26/–
- Source: Cricinfo, 12 September 2026

Mohammad Imran Randhawa (born 25 December 1996) is a Pakistani cricketer who plays for Multan Sultans. An all-rounder, he plays as a right-handed batsman and right-arm medium bowler.

Previously, he has played domestic cricket for Bahawalpur, Sui Northern Gas Pipelines Limited, Federally Administered Tribal Areas, Peshawar, Faisalabad, Punjab, Southern Punjab, Multan, State Bank of Pakistan, and Oil and Gas Development Company Limited, and has represented Peshawar Zalmi, Dhaka Dominators and Multan Sultans in Twenty20 franchise cricket.

== Early life ==
Randhawa was born in Khanewal, Punjab into a family of farmers, with all six brothers playing cricket while growing up. Before taking up cricket professionally he also trained as a kabaddi player.

== Domestic career ==
From 2013, he played regional under-19 cricket for Bahawalpur, but began to focus fully on cricket after being spotted by former first-class cricketer Azhar Shafiq during a net session in Sindh in 2014. He subsequently played Grade II cricket before making his first-class debut for Sui Northern Gas Pipelines Limited against Port Qasim Authority in the 2015–16 Quaid-e-Azam Trophy at the Iqbal Stadium in Faisalabad.

Randhawa played for Sui Northern Gas Pipelines Limited from 2015–16 to 2018–19 and later became part of Southern Punjab in Pakistan's restructured domestic system. He was the joint-highest wicket-taker in the 2019–20 National T20 Cup and took 23 wickets in the 2019–20 Quaid-e-Azam Trophy second XI competition before being promoted to Southern Punjab's first XI squad. He was named in Southern Punjab's squad for the 2022–23 Quaid-e-Azam Trophy, and in October 2022 took 3 for 75 for Southern Punjab against Balochistan at the Rawalpindi Cricket Stadium.

In September 2024, Randhawa played for the Markhors in the Champions One-Day Cup. Against the Dolphins at the Iqbal Stadium, he took 3 for 28 and made 27 as the Markhors won by 92 runs. In November 2024, he received his maiden call-up to the Pakistan Shaheens squad for a 50-over series against Sri Lanka A. He was also named in a Pakistan Shaheens squad to play a warm-up match against Afghanistan before the 2025 ICC Champions Trophy.

== Franchise career ==
=== Pakistan Super League ===
Randhawa was part of Lahore Qalandars as an emerging player in PSL 4 but did not play a match. He later joined Peshawar Zalmi during the 2020 Pakistan Super League playoffs after Hasan Ali was ruled out through injury. In the eliminator against Lahore Qalandars at the National Stadium, Karachi, he hit a six from the second ball he faced and took the wicket of Ben Dunk, although Peshawar were beaten by five wickets.

Randhawa was signed by Multan Sultans ahead of the 2026 Pakistan Super League. By the end of the 2026 PSL season, he had played six PSL matches, scoring 50 runs and taking four wickets.

=== Other leagues ===
He played three matches for Dhaka Dominators in the Bangladesh Premier League during the 2022–23 season.

== International career ==
In August 2026, Randhawa was one of the five uncapped players called to the national squad midway through Pakistan's tour of England.

In October 2026, he made his T20I debut in the home series against Sri Lanka. In the first match, he got 2 wickets for 21 runs, with an economy rate of 5.25. In the second match, he was noted for his bowling spell: 3/11 in 4 overs, with an economy rate of 2.75 on a pitch where Pakistan had earlier posted a total of 215.
