= Abdullah Fazal =

Pakistani cricketer (born 2003)

Personal information
- Full name: Abdullah Fazal
- Born: 16 January 2003 (age 23); Karachi, Sindh, Pakistan
- Batting: Left-handed
- Role: Opening batter

International information
- National side: Pakistan (2026–present)
- Test debut (cap 262): 8 May 2026 v Bangladesh
- Last Test: 16 May 2026 v Bangladesh

Domestic team information
- Years: Team
- 2024–2026: Karachi Region Blues
- 2025: Higher Education Commission
- 2025–2026: State Bank of Pakistan
- 2026: Karachi Region Whites
- 2026: Rawalpindiz

Career statistics
Competition	Test	FC	T20
Matches	2	27	16
Runs scored	141	1,969	517
Batting average	35.25	41.02	57.44
100s/50s	0/2	4/12	1/3
Top score	66	182	103*
Catches/stumpings	2/–	26/–	11/–
- Source: Cricinfo, 31 August 2026

Abdullah Fazal (born 16 January 2003) is a Pakistani cricketer who plays for Rawalpindiz. Fazal is a left-handed opening batter. He was born in Karachi, Sindh, Pakistan.

Fazal has played senior domestic cricket for Karachi Region Blues, Higher Education Commission, State Bank of Pakistan, Karachi Region Whites and Rawalpindiz. He made his first-class debut for Karachi Region Blues against Quetta Region in the 2024–25 Quaid-e-Azam Trophy, and made his Twenty20 debut for the same side against Larkana Region in the 2024–25 National T20 Cup.

In November 2024, Fazal scored 129 for Karachi Region Blues against FATA in the 2024–25 Quaid-e-Azam Trophy, his first century in senior cricket. In March 2025, he made his first Twenty20 century, scoring an unbeaten 103 from 61 balls for Karachi Region Blues against Peshawar Region in the National T20 Cup.

Fazal's most productive first-class run came in the 2025–26 domestic season. In the final of the 2025–26 Quaid-e-Azam Trophy, he made 88 in the first innings and 114 in the second against Sialkot Region, helping Karachi Region Blues to a 218-run win and being named player of the final.

Playing for State Bank of Pakistan in the 2025–26 President's Trophy Grade-I, Fazal then scored 113 against Ghani Glass, the only batter in his side's first innings to pass 21. Later that month, he made a career-best 182 against Oil and Gas Development Company Limited, sharing a second-wicket partnership of 274 with Mohammad Huraira.

== International career ==
He made his Test debut on 8 May 2026, against Bangladesh in Mirpur, Dhaka.
