= Mohammad Awais =

Pakistani cricketer (born 1992)

Personal information
- Born: 25 October 1992 (age 34); Hyderabad, Pakistan
- Batting: Right-handed
- Role: Wicket-keeper
- Source: Cricinfo, 28 November 2015

Mohammad Awais (born 25 October 1992) is a Pakistani first-class cricketer who has played for Hyderabad and the Pakistan national under-19 team. He plays as a wicket-keeper batsman.
