= Mohammad Abbas (cricketer) =

Pakistani cricketer (born 1990)

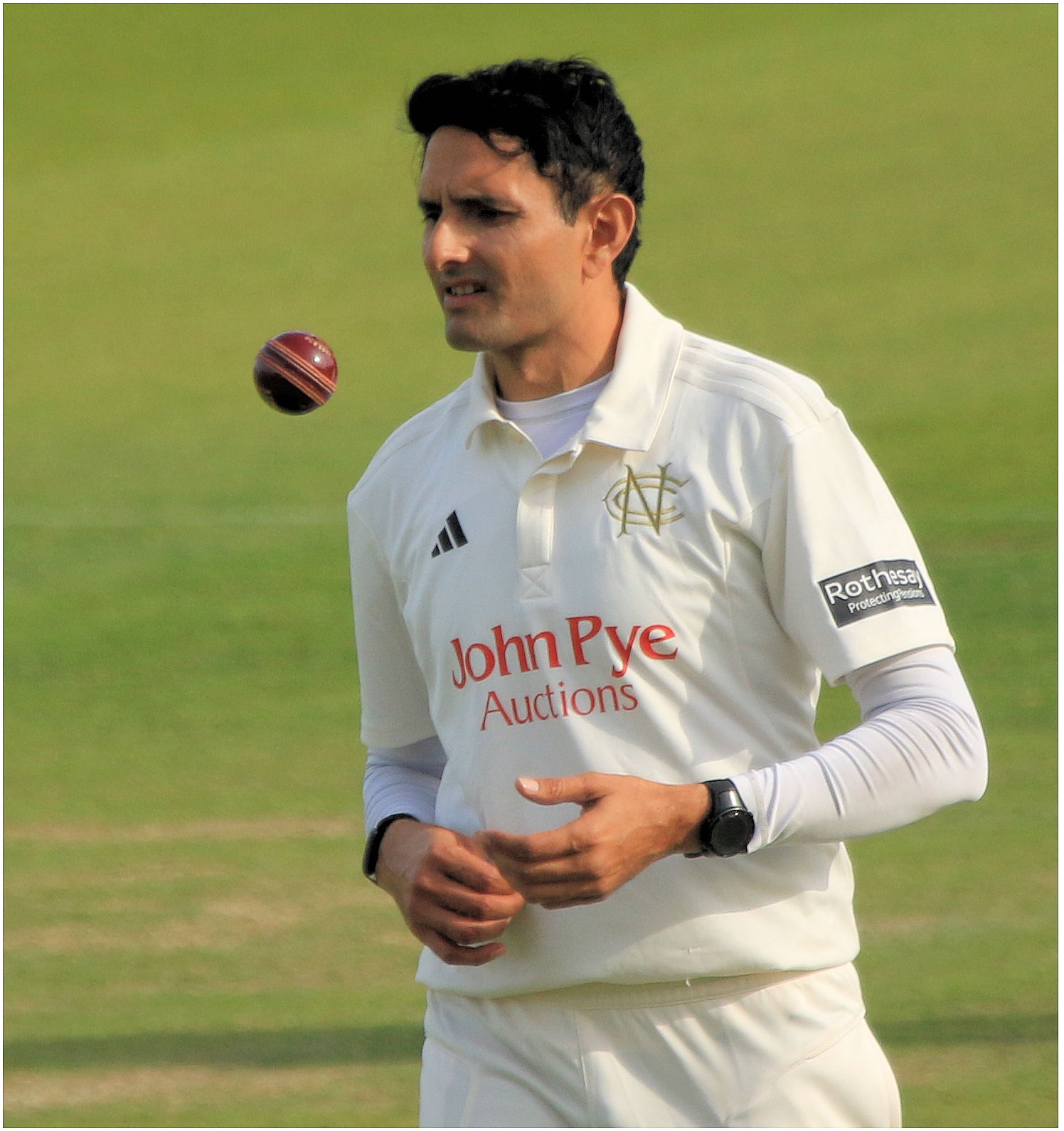
- Abbas playing for Nottinghamshire in 2025

Personal information
- Born: 10 March 1990 (age 36); Sialkot, Punjab, Pakistan
- Height: 6 ft 1 in (185 cm)
- Batting: Right-handed
- Bowling: Right-arm medium fast
- Role: Bowler

International information
- National side: Pakistan (2017–present)
- Test debut (cap 226): 21 April 2017 v West Indies
- Last Test: 17 November 2026 v Sri Lanka
- ODI debut (cap 220): 22 March 2019 v Australia
- Last ODI: 31 March 2019 v Australia

Domestic team information
- Years: Team
- 2009–2015: Sialkot Stallions
- 2018–2019: Multan Sultans (squad no. 26)
- 2018–2019: Leicestershire (squad no. 26)
- 2019–2023: Southern Punjab (squad no. 38)
- 2021–2024: Hampshire (squad no. 38)
- 2023–present: State Bank of Pakistan
- 2025: Nottinghamshire
- 2026: Derbyshire

Career statistics
Competition	Test	ODI	FC	LA
Matches	35	3	231	63
Runs scored	242	–	1,344	149
Batting average	8.64	–	7.72	7.77
100s/50s	0/0	–	0/0	0/0
Top score	42	–	42	15*
Balls bowled	7,401	162	44,497	3,065
Wickets	139	1	944	84
Bowling average	22.35	153.00	20.42	29.94
5 wickets in innings	8	0	60	0
10 wickets in match	1	0	14	0
Best bowling	6/54	1/44	8/46	4/31
Catches/stumpings	13/–	0/–	64/–	15/–
- Source: Cricinfo, 20 November 2026

Mohammad Abbas (born 10 March 1990) is a Pakistani professional cricket right-arm medium-fast bowler who has represented the Pakistan national team since 2017. He is signed with State Bank of Pakistan cricket team since 2023 and Derbyshire County Cricket Club since 2025.

In August 2018, he was one of thirty-three players to be awarded a central contract for the 2018–19 season by the Pakistan Cricket Board (PCB). The International Cricket Council (ICC) named Abbas as one of the five breakout stars in men's cricket in 2018. In July 2021, Abbas lost his central contract after failing to maintain his place in the national team.

== Early life ==
Abbas was born in a small village Jathekey near Sambrial. Before his first-class debut, he earned his livelihood through welding work in a leather factory and working as a helper in a law firm in Sialkot.

== Domestic career ==
=== Pakistan ===
Abbas took the most wickets in the 2015–16 Quaid-e-Azam Trophy, with a total of 61 dismissals for the tournament. He was again the leading wicket-taker in the following tournament, with 71 dismissals.

Abbas was the leading wicket-taker for Sui Northern Gas Pipelines Limited in the 2017–18 Quaid-e-Azam Trophy, with 37 dismissals in seven matches.

=== England ===
In January 2018, Abbas signed for Leicestershire County Cricket Club. In September of that year, he re-signed for the club for the 2019 season.

On 4 March 2021, Abbas signed for Hampshire County Cricket Club as one of their overseas players for the first two months of the 2021 County Championship season in England. In April 2021, in Hampshire's match against Middlesex, Abbas took a hat-trick during Middlesex's first innings. In January 2022, Abbas re-signed with Hampshire ahead of the 2022 County Championship. Abbas had a stellar run with the Hampshire side and in his three seasons with the club, he picked up 180 wickets with an average of 19.26.

In February 2025, Abbas signed a contract to play six matches for Nottinghamshire in the county championship. He took 5 for 31 on his debut for Nottinghamshire against Hampshire at Trent Bridge in May 2025. In June of that year, Abbas extended his stay with the county.

In December 2025, Abbas signed a two-year contract with Derbyshire County Cricket Club.

== International career ==
In April 2017, Abbas was added to Pakistan's Test squad for their series against the West Indies. He made his Test debut for Pakistan against the West Indies on 21 April 2017 at Sabina Park. He took his maiden Test wicket with his second ball, dismissing Kraigg Brathwaite for nought and finished the match with three wickets. Abbas took his maiden five-wicket haul, against West Indies, in his third Test match.

Abbas took ten wickets in Pakistan's two-Test series against England in May and June 2018, and was named the player of the series. In August 2018, he was named the PCB's Test Player of the Year.

In October 2018, in the series against Australia, Abbas took his 50th wicket in his tenth Test match, becoming the joint-quickest fast bowler to take 50 wickets for Pakistan in Tests. In the last test of that series, he took his first ten-wicket haul in international cricket with five wickets in each innings. Abbas was the first pace bowler to achieve this feat in the United Arab Emirates. He was also named in ICC Men's Test Team of the Year for his performances with the ball in 2018.

In March 2019, Abbas was named in Pakistan's One Day International (ODI) squad for their series against Australia. He made his ODI debut for Pakistan against Australia on 22 March 2019. In November 2019, he was selected again for the tour of Australia. He played in the second Test, but he did not take a wicket.

In June 2020, Abbas was named in a 29-man squad for Pakistan's tour to England during the COVID-19 pandemic. In July, he was shortlisted in Pakistan's 20-man squad for the Test matches against England. In November 2020, he was named in Pakistan's 35-man squad for their tour to New Zealand. Abbas found himself being sidelined from Pakistani test cricket team for a duration of three years from 2021 to late 2024, despite not having a slump in his bowling form, and he continued to serve as a workhorse in the domestic setup during the phase when he was left out of the Pakistani side. After his first 25 test match appearances, he was ranked only behind Imran Khan among the Pakistan quicks for having maintained an healthy bowling average with many scalps to his name. His bowling average stood out at 23.02 while having taken 90 wickets from those matches and to everyone's surprise, he was snubbed from the Pakistani team selection for future test series.

In December 2024, he made a comeback return to Pakistani test squad after hiatus of three years when he was named in the Pakistani test squad's tour of South Africa. In his first Test match back, he took a six-wicket haul, single-handedly pushing Pakistan close to a historic win. He finished the series with 10 wickets in total, ending as the joint top wicket-taker alongside South Africa's Marco Jansen. In the second Test, he took his 100th wicket, bowling Kwena Maphaka.

In August 2026, during the second Test of the away tour against England, he took a five-wicket haul with figures of 5-57 at Lord's.

== Playing style ==
Operating at around 75-77 mph (125-130 kph) with a nondescript, highly repeatable run-up and action close to the stumps, Abbas relies heavily on scrambled-seam and wobble-seam deliveries, using long fingers to manipulate the ball both ways off the pitch. He has been noted for his accuracy and high dot-ball percentages. According to The Athletic, "almost half of Abbas’ Test victims have fallen leg before wicket or bowled."
