= Ghazi Ghori =

Pakistani cricketer (born 2003)

Personal information
- Full name: Muhammad Ghazi Ghori
- Born: 16 March 2003 (age 23); Karachi, Sindh, Pakistan
- Batting: Right-handed
- Role: Wicket-keeper

International information
- National side: Pakistan (2026–present)
- Only Test (cap 266): 9 September 2026 v England
- ODI debut (cap 259): 15 March 2026 v Bangladesh
- Last ODI: 4 June 2026 v Australia

Domestic team information
- Years: Team
- 2023/24–2024/25: Karachi Whites
- 2023/24–2024: Higher Education Commission
- 2024/25–2025/26: State Bank of Pakistan
- 2024/25: Dolphins
- 2025: Islamabad United
- 2025/26: Karachi Blues

Career statistics
Competition	Test	ODI	FC	LA
Matches	1	4	27	21
Runs scored	20	139	1,712	345
Batting average	10.00	34.75	39.81	24.64
100s/50s	0/0	0/1	3/10	0/2
Top score	16	65	138	65
Catches/stumpings	2/0	3/1	66/10	20/4
- Source: Cricinfo, 12 September 2026

Muhammad Ghazi Ghori (Note: Urdu: غازی غوری) (born 16 March 2003) is a Pakistani cricketer. Ghori is a right-handed batsman and wicket-keeper.

== Early life ==
He was born on 16 March 2003 in Karachi, Sindh, Pakistan.

== Domestic career ==
Ghori represented Pakistan Under-19s before making his first-class debut for Karachi Whites against Faisalabad Region in the final of the 2023–24 Quaid-e-Azam Trophy. He made his List A debut for Higher Education Commission against State Bank of Pakistan in the 2024 President's Cup Grade-I (One Day), and his Twenty20 debut for Dolphins against Panthers in the 2024–25 Champions T20 Cup. He later played first-class cricket for State Bank of Pakistan, regional Twenty20 cricket for Karachi Blues, and franchise cricket for Islamabad United in the Pakistan Super League.

Ghori's maiden first-class century came in December 2023, when he made 110 for Higher Education Commission against Water and Power Development Authority in the second innings after his side had conceded a first-innings lead. In January 2026, playing for State Bank of Pakistan against Ghani Glass, he followed an overnight 113 not out with 138 in the second innings, sharing a fourth-wicket partnership of 179 with Rameez Aziz. The following month, he made 128 not out against WAPDA, his third first-class century and second in the tournament, sharing a third-wicket stand of 148 with Mohammad Huraira.

== International career ==
In March 2026, Ghori made his One Day International debut for Pakistan against Bangladesh at Mirpur, scoring 29 after entering at 64 for 3 and sharing a 50-run partnership with Abdul Samad.

In September 2026, during the first Test of the home series against Sri Lanka, Ghori made 6 dismissals in an innings, the second highest number for a Pakistani wicket-keeper after Wasim Bari, who had 7 against New Zealand in 1979.
