= Ghani Group =

Pakistani conglomerate company

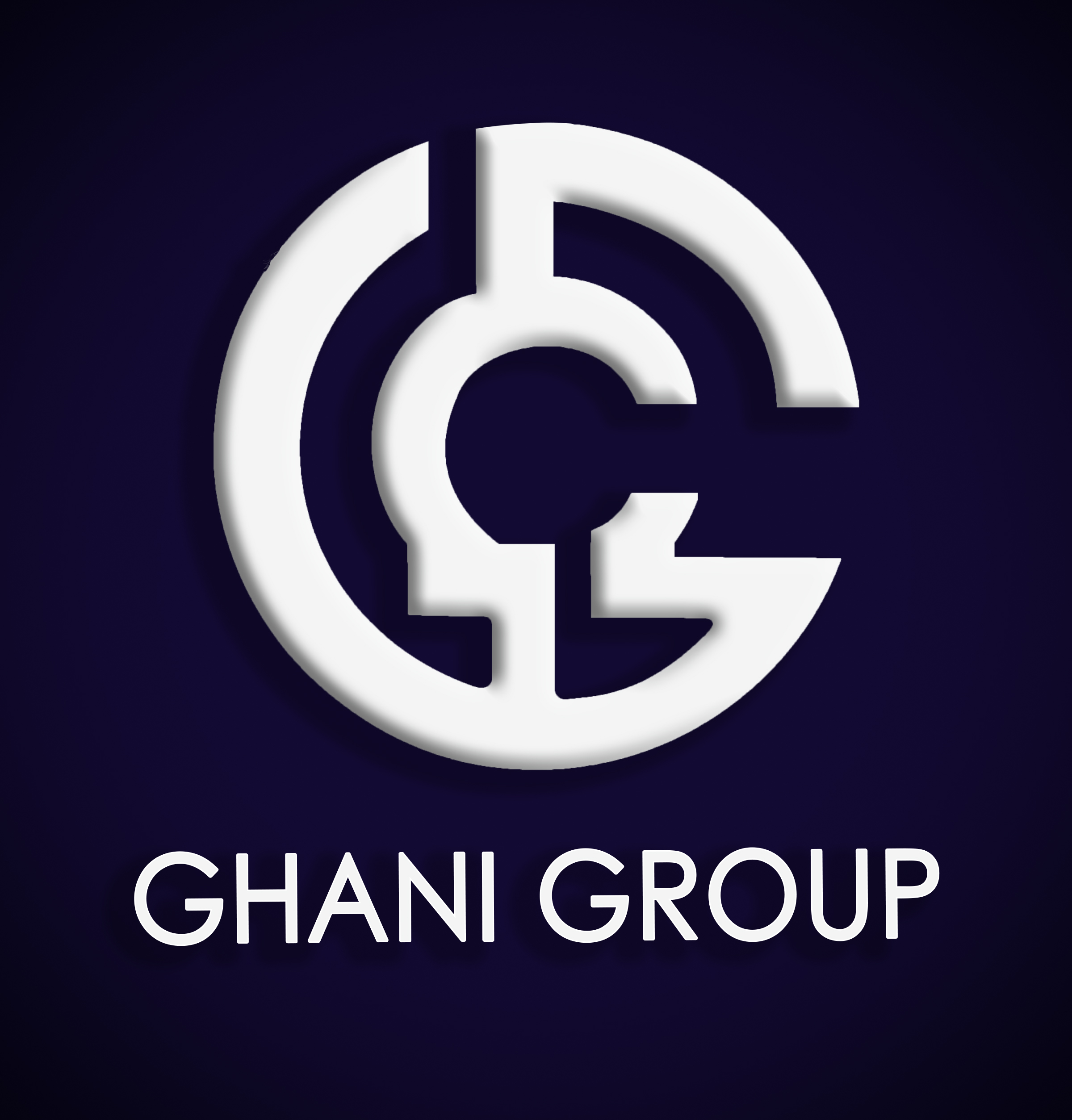
- Type: Public
- Traded as: PSX: GHGL
- Industry: Conglomerate
- Founded: 1959
- Founder: Jubair Ghani
- Headquarters: Lahore, Pakistan
- Area served: Pakistan and UAE
- Revenue: ▲ -$300 Million USD
- Website: www.ghanigroup.com.pk

Ghani Group of Companies, commonly known as Ghani Group, is a Pakistani conglomerate company headquartered in Lahore, Pakistan. It encompasses different business sectors: Dairy, Mining, Glass, Construction, Poultry and Automobiles.

== Ownership ==
The current chairman of the Ghani Group of Companies is Aitzaz Ghani.

== History ==
Ghani Group of companies was founded in 1959 by Aitzaz Ghani as a trading company. It has operations in two countries Pakistan and UAE. The major Ghani Group of Companies are Ghani Mines, Ghani Halal Feed Mill, Ghani Glass, Ghani Dairies, and Ghani Automobile Industries.

In 1963, Ghani Mines (Pvt) Ltd was established.

In 1992, Ghani Glass Limited was established.
