= Arafat Minhas =

Pakistani cricketer (born 2005)

Personal information
- Born: 2 January 2005 (age 21); Multan, Punjab, Pakistan
- Height: 5 ft 11 in (180 cm)
- Batting: Left-handed
- Bowling: Slow left-arm orthodox
- Role: All-rounder
- Relatives: Sameer Minhas (brother)

International information
- National side: Pakistan (2023–present)
- ODI debut (cap 261): 30 May 2026 v Australia
- Last ODI: 20 October 2026 v England
- ODI shirt no.: 90
- T20I debut (cap 104): 3 October 2023 v Hong Kong
- Last T20I: 13 October 2026 v Sri Lanka

Domestic team information
- Years: Team
- 2022/23: Southern Punjab
- 2023: Multan Sultans (squad no. 66)
- 2024–2025: Karachi Kings (squad no. 23)
- 2026: Multan Sultans (squad no. 23)

Career statistics
| Competition | ODI | T20I | FC | LA |
|---|---|---|---|---|
| Matches | 5 | 7 | 17 | 28 |
| Runs scored | 137 | 94 | 941 | 626 |
| Batting average | 34.25 | 30.00 | 32.44 | 28.45 |
| 100s/50s | 0/1 | 0/0 | 1/4 | 0/4 |
| Top score | 59 | 34* | 152* | 82 |
| Balls bowled | 262 | 126 | 1,128 | 1,146 |
| Wickets | 13 | 9 | 22 | 35 |
| Bowling average | 15.00 | 15.11 | 32.36 | 24.37 |
| 5 wickets in innings | 1 | 0 | 0 | 2 |
| 10 wickets in match | 0 | 0 | 0 | 0 |
| Best bowling | 6/40 | 2/11 | 3/36 | 6/40 |
| Catches/stumpings | 1/– | 2/– | 13/– | 11/– |
Medal record
Representing Pakistan
Asian Games
| Silver medal – second place | 2026 Aichi–Nagoya | Team |
- Source: Cricinfo, 22 October 2026

Arafat Minhas (born 2 January 2005) is a Pakistani cricketer who plays for the Pakistan cricket team and Multan Sultans. An all-rounder, Minhas is a left-handed batsman who bowls left arm orthodox.

== Early career ==
Minhas was born in Multan, Punjab into a Rajput family. Minhas considers his father, former Under-19 cricketer Kashif Minhas, to be his role model and also admires AB de Villiers. His father began training Minhas as an all-rounder at the age of 8.

Minhas began to play red-ball club-level cricket at the age of 9 and went on to play Under-13 and Under-16 cricket. In Under-19 cricket he was adjudged player of the tournament in the National Under-19 Championship 2021/22.

Despite his strong performances at the Under-19 level, his father at one point wanted Minhas to quit cricket and take over the family's car showroom business before changing his mind.

== Youth career ==
Minhas has played for the Pakistan under-19 team.

On 15 May 2023, in the 5th and final Youth ODI during the Pakistan U19 tour of Bangladesh, Minhas scored 40 off 42 before taking 3 wickets for 20 runs in 7.3 overs (including a maiden over), with an economy rate of 2.66. He was also responsible for the run out of Mohammad Shihab James, Bangladesh's top scorer in the match.

On 24 October 2023, in the 2nd Youth ODI in Karachi against Sri Lanka U19, Minhas was named Player of the Match for his all-round contribution: he hit 95 off 66 deliveries (nine fours, two sixes) followed by an economical spell with the ball, conceding only 21 runs in 10 overs.

In December 2023, Minhas was included in the squad for the 2023 ACC Under-19 Asia Cup and was named vice-captain.

He was then named in the squad for the 2024 Under-19 Cricket World Cup. On 27 January 2024, in a group match against New Zealand U19, Minhas was noted for his bowling figures, as he got 3 wickets for 6 runs in 5 overs, with an economy rate of 1.20. On 8 February 2024, in the semi-final against Australia U19, who would later go on to win the trophy, Minhas was the joint top-scorer with 52 and later took 2 wickets for 20 runs in 10 overs, with an economy rate of 2. As a batsman he was noted for being attacking while his bowling "brought Pakistan into the game." In what has been described as a thrilling match, Pakistan eventually lost it by 1 wicket (with 5 balls remaining.) During the tournament, Minhas took 8 wickets at an average of 9.87 while he also scored 105 runs at an average of 21.

== Domestic career ==
Minhas captained Gwadar Sharks in the 2022 Pakistan Junior League and was named in the team of the tournament as captain. Minhas made his List A debut for Southern Punjab against Sindh on 10 December 2022 during the 2022–23 Pakistan Cup. Minhas was selected by Multan Sultans in the supplementary category during the 2023 Pakistan Super League players draft. He was selected by Karachi Kings in the silver category during the 2024 Pakistan Super League players draft.

== International career ==
In December 2022, Minhas was among the "three high-performing teenagers" added the Pakistani Test squad along with Mohammad Zeeshan and Basit Ali by the interim selection committee.

In August 2023, he was named in Pakistan's squad for the 2022 Asian Games. On 3 October 2023, Minhas made his T20I debut for Pakistan against Hong Kong during the Asian Games. He hit 25 off 16 deliveries and later took 2 wickets for 19 runs, with an economy rate of 4.75.

On 19 October 2024, playing for Pakistan Shaheens against India A during the 2024 ACC Emerging Teams Asia Cup, Minhas hit a rapid 41 off 29 deliveries with the bat but then was dismissed in a controversial umpiring decision, which some observers say impacted the outcome of the match, Pakistan losing by a mere 7 runs.

On 5 December 2024, in the 3rd T20I of the tour of Zimbabwe, Minhas hit 22 in a low scoring game and then bowled 4 overs for 17 runs, while he took no wickets he had the best economy rate among Pakistan bowlers (4.25), in a match that Pakistan lost by 2 wickets (with 1 ball remaining.)

On 30 May 2026, he made his One Day International (ODI) debut against Australia in the 1st match of the home series. With bowling figures of 5/32 in 10 overs, most of the wickets being top and middle-order batsmen, and reducing Australia to 200, he became the first spinner as well the first Pakistan bowler to take five wickets on ODI debut and was declared Player of the Match, as Pakistan won the match. He was later declared Player of the Series for his all-round performance in the three matches.

In June 2026, he was named in the 15-member men's squad announced for the 2026 Asian Games. On 3 October 2026, Pakistan won the silver medal after losing in the Asian Games men’s cricket final against India at the Kōrogi Athletic Park in Nisshin, Japan.

In October 2026, Minhas was named Player of the Match in the first match against England at the Rawalpindi Cricket Stadium in a home ODI tri-series that also included Sri Lanka. He made his maiden international half-century, scoring 59 runs off 58 balls, including nine fours, before taking a career-best six wickets for 40 runs in 8.4 overs and then effecting a run out on the final play. He became only the third Pakistani to score a half-century and take a five-wicket haul in the same ODI. He was named Player of the Series after he scored 61 runs off 31 balls, with three fours and four sixes, in the final match against Sri Lanka at the Gaddafi Stadium in Lahore.
