= Azan Awais =

Pakistani cricketer

Personal information
- Born: 10 October 2004 (age 22); Sialkot, Punjab, Pakistan
- Batting: Left-handed

International information
- National side: Pakistan (2026–present)
- Test debut (cap 261): 8 May 2026 v Bangladesh
- Last Test: 9 September 2026 v England

Domestic team information
- Years: Team
- 2024/25–present: Sialkot
- 2024/25: Eshaal Associates
- 2025/26: Sui Northern

Career statistics
Competition	Test	FC	LA
Matches	7	40	13
Runs scored	357	3,030	375
Batting average	25.50	43.91	28.84
100s/50s	1/2	11/11	0/5
Top score	103	203*	88
Catches/stumpings	0/–	23/–	2/–
- Source: Cricinfo, 12 September 2026

Azan Awais (born 10 October 2004) is a Pakistani cricketer who began playing first-class cricket for Sialkot in the 2024–25 season.

Awais was born in Sialkot. A left-handed opening batsman, he represented Sialkot in under-age cricket before being selected for the Pakistan Under-19 team. In May 2026 he scored a century in his debut Test match against Bangladesh, becoming the 14th Pakistan player to do so.

== Youth career ==
In October 2023, Awais scored 104 for Pakistan in an Under-19 Test against Sri Lanka, and he later played in the 2024 ICC Under-19 World Cup, where he equal-top-scored in the semi-final against Australia.

In December 2023, during the Under-19 Asia Cup, Awais struck 105 (130)* to anchor Pakistan’s eight-wicket win over India, and was named Player of the Match.

== Domestic career ==
Awais made his first-class debut in the 2024–25 Quaid-e-Azam Trophy. In his third match he scored 130, putting on 312 for the opening stand with Ashir Mehmood against Dera Murad Jamali. Later, in Sialkot's two matches in the triangular stage, he scored 203 not out (when he batted throughout Sialkot's innings of 410 all out), 168 and 121 in his three innings. Sialkot won the final, and he was the tournament's highest scorer, with 844 runs from eight matches and an average of 76.73.

In January 2025, in the first match of the 2024–25 President's Trophy, playing for Eshaal Associates in their inaugural first-class match, Awais made 69 and 119, and Eshaal Associates won by 192 runs. He thus brought up his 1,000th run in his ninth first-class match.

== International career ==
In August 2025, on Pakistan Shaheens' 2025 tour of England, Awais topped the side's run-scorers with 276 runs in seven innings. He made his Test debut on 8 May 2026, against Bangladesh in Mirpur. He scored a century on debut, becoming the 14th Pakistani to do so and the third Pakistani to do so outside Pakistan.
