= Saad Baig =

Pakistani cricketer (born 2006)

Personal information
- Born: 1 November 2006 (age 20); Karachi, Sindh, Pakistan
- Batting: Left-handed
- Role: Wicketkeeper-batsman

Career statistics
Competition	FC	LA	T20
Matches	27	15	25
Runs scored	1,739	501	446
Batting average	39.52	35.78	24.77
100s/50s	4/8	0/5	0/2
Top score	154	77	72*
Catches/stumpings	79/11	17/3	8/3
- Source: Cricinfo, 31 August 2026

Saad Baig (born 1 November 2006) is a Pakistani cricketer. He is left-handed batter and wicket keeper. He plays for Karachi Blues in domestic cricket and was selected for the Karachi Kings team for the 2025 Pakistan Super League.

== Youth career ==
Baig made his debut for the Pakistan national under-19 cricket team shortly after turning 16 years-old, playing against Bangladesh U19 in 2022. He was named as captain of the team the following year, as Pakistan played the U19 Asia Cup. He went on to captain the Pakistan U19 team at the 2024 Under-19 Cricket World Cup, and scored a half-century against Afghanistan U19.

== Domestic career ==
=== First-class ===
Baig made his first-class cricket debut in 2024. The following season, he made his maiden first class century for Karachi Blues in the second round of the Quaid-e-Azam Trophy in October 2025, scoring 154 in Karachi's first innings and 65 not out in the second innings against Multan. Karachi Blues won the final and Baig was named Player of the Tournament after scoring 1000 runs and effecting 32 dismissals as wicketkeeper across ten matches. He also received the awards for Best Batter and Best Wicketkeeper of the season.

=== T20 ===
Baig was selected for the Karachi Kings team for the 2025 Pakistan Super League. In 2025, he also played T20 cricket for the Dhande Fighters, scoring a century against Wada Hunters in the Khatri Premier League in July 2025.

== International career ==
On 18 October 2026, Baig made his One Day International debut for Pakistan national cricket team against Sri Lanka during the opening match of the tri-series at the Rawalpindi Cricket Stadium.
