= Abdul Samad (Pakistani cricketer) =

Pakistani cricketer (born 1998)

Personal information
- Full name: Syed Muhammad Abdul Samad
- Born: 25 January 1998 (age 28); Faisalabad, Pakistan
- Height: 1.89 m (6 ft 2 in)
- Batting: Right-handed
- Role: Batsman

International information
- National side: Pakistan
- ODI debut (cap 255): 11 March 2026 v Bangladesh
- Last ODI: 2 June 2026 v Australia
- T20I debut (cap 119): 16 March 2025 v New Zealand
- Last T20I: 26 March 2025 v New Zealand

Domestic team information
- Years: Team
- 2016/17: Pakistan International Airlines
- 2017/18, 2023/24–2024/25: Faisalabad
- 2018/19: Rawalpindi
- 2023/24–2024/25: Sui Northern Gas Pipelines Limited
- 2024-present: Markhors

Career statistics
Competition	ODI	T20I	FC	LA
Matches	5	5	18	37
Runs scored	48	66	456	1,040
Batting average	12.00	16.50	13.81	32.50
100s/50s	0/0	0/0	0/2	2/5
Top score	34	44	59	130*
Balls bowled	-	–	76	18
Wickets	-	–	1	0
Bowling average	–	–	52.00	–
5 wickets in innings	–	–	0	–
10 wickets in match	–	–	0	–
Best bowling	–	–	1/16	–
Catches/stumpings	1/–	1/–	21/–	15/–
Medal record
Representing Pakistan
Asian Games
Silver medal – second place	2026 Aichi–Nagoya	Team
- Source: ESPNcricinfo, 3 June 2025

Syed Muhammad Abdul Samad (born 25 January 1998) is a Pakistani cricketer.

== Domestic and franchise career ==
He made his List A debut for Pakistan International Airlines in the 2016–17 Departmental One Day Cup on 17 December 2016. He made his first-class debut for Faisalabad in the 2017–18 Quaid-e-Azam Trophy on 26 September 2017.

In April 2018, he was named in Punjab's squad for the 2018 Pakistan Cup. He made his Twenty20 debut for Faisalabad Region on 24 November 2023.

In April 2025, in Peshawar Zalmi’s record 120-run victory over Multan Sultans during the 2025 Pakistan Super League, Abdul Samad provided the decisive acceleration with 40 off just 14 balls, batting at a strike rate of 285.71. His innings maintained relentless pressure on the opposition and ensured Zalmi's total surged past 220, setting up a dominant win. Abdul Samad's aggression and intent were highlighted as the turning point of the innings, giving the side crucial momentum heading into the second innings. He was declared Player of the Match for his knock as well for his 3 catches.

In August 2025, Abdul Samad was part of the Pakistan Shaheens squad that played the 2025 Top End T20 Series. On August 18, he hit an unbeaten century (110* off 63 balls) and helped his team win against Melbourne Renegades Academy from a difficult position, as no other player in the side crossed 23.

== International career ==
In March 2025, he was named in Pakistan national cricket team squad for the away tour of New Zealand. On 16 March 2025, he made his T20I debut against New Zealand at Hagley Oval, during the first match of the tour. In the fourth T20I, Pakistan's batting collapsed, at 56–8, but Abdul Samad provided resistance with an unbeaten 44, ensuring Pakistan avoided what would have been their lowest total in T20 internationals (74 against Australia in 2012). His innings helped the side surpass that mark, although the eventual score of 105 was still Pakistan's lowest total against New Zealand in the format. New Zealand went on to win the match.

On 11 March 2026, he made his One Day International debut against Bangladesh at Sher-e-Bangla in Dhaka, during the first match of Pakistan's away tour of Bangladesh.

In June 2026, he was named vice captain of the 15-member men's squad announced for the 2026 Asian Games. On 3 October 2026, Pakistan won the silver medal after losing in the Asian Games men’s cricket final against India at the Kōrogi Athletic Park in Nisshin, Japan.
