= Maaz Sadaqat =

Pakistani cricketer (born 2005)

Personal information
- Full name: Maaz Sadaqat
- Born: 15 May 2005 (age 21); Peshawar, Khyber Pakhtunkhwa, Pakistan
- Batting: Left-handed
- Bowling: Slow left-arm orthodox
- Role: Batting all-rounder

International information
- National side: Pakistan (2026-present)
- ODI debut (cap 256): 11 March 2026 v Bangladesh
- Last ODI: 2 June 2026 v Australia

Domestic team information
- Years: Team
- 2022–2023: Khyber Pakhtunkhwa
- 2023: City Club
- 2023–present: Khan Research Laboratories cricket team
- 2025: Peshawar Zalmi
- 2025-26: Noakhali Express
- 2026: Hyderabad Kingsmen

Career statistics
Competition	ODI	FC	LA	T20
Matches	5	25	33	45
Runs scored	107	1,451	1,079	1,207
Batting average	21.40	38.18	35.96	32.62
100s/50s	0/1	2/12	3/7	0/8
Top score	75	114	114	96*
Balls bowled	48	1,219	683	318
Wickets	3	17	20	17
Bowling average	13.00	40.82	30.30	21.00
5 wickets in innings	0	1	0	0
10 wickets in match	0	0	0	0
Best bowling	3/23	5/80	3/23	2/12
Catches/stumpings	–/–	24/–	23/–	22/–
Medal record
Representing Pakistan
Asian Games
Silver medal – second place	2026 Aichi–Nagoya	Team
- Source: ESPNcricinfo, 3 June 2026

Maaz Sadaqat (Note: Urdu: معاذ صداقت) (born 15 May 2005) is a Pakistani cricketer, a batting all-rounder who is a left-handed batsman and an occasional slow left-arm orthodox spinner. He plays for Khyber Pakhtunkhwa cricket team in domestic cricket. He also previously played for the Pakistan national under-19 cricket team.

== Early life ==
Maaz Sadaqat was born on 15 May 2005 in Peshawar, Khyber Pakhtunkhwa, Pakistan. His elder brother Haroon Sadaqat is also a cricketer. He developed his early cricketing roots through club and youth cricket in Peshawar, joining Ashnaghar Cricket Club soon after completing his school-level matriculation. He played at the district level for Peshawar U19, and later emerged as one of the top scorers in the regional U19 tournament for Khyber Pakhtunkhwa (KP), which earned him selection in Pakistan's under-19 teams.

== Youth career ==
Sadaqat has represented the Khyber Pakhtunkhwa under-19 team in age level cricket. He made his under-19 debut for Khyber Pakhtunkhwa on 12 October 2019, against Central Punjab under-19 in the 2019–20 PCB National Under-19s One Day Tournament. He picked up a five-wicket haul in that match. He was the highest run-scorer for Khyber Pakhtunkhwa in the 2020–21 PCB National Under-19s One Day Tournament, hitting 363 runs including a century. In December 2020, he was selected to play for Khyber Pakhtunkhwa in the Second XI Pakistan Cup One-Day Tournament.

On 14 November 2021, he scored 63 runs against Khyber Pakhtunkhwa Under-19s Whites in the final match of the 2021–22 PCB National Under-19 Cup, helping his team to win the match by 43 runs and become the champions. He was the second highest run-scorer overall in that competition hitting 308 runs. In December 2021, he was named in Pakistan's under-19 squad for the 2021 ACC Under-19 Asia Cup and 2022 ICC Under-19 Cricket World Cup.

He also played for the Khyber Pakhtunkhwa Second XI team in the 2022–23 Cricket Associations T20 Cup, where he remained as the leading run-scorer for his team hitting 350 runs from ten matches. On 16 December 2022, he scored 64 runs and took 4 wickets, helping his team to defeat Northern by 39 runs in the Cricket Associations Challenge. He also became the team's leading run-scorer hitting 423 runs from ten matches.

== Domestic and franchise career ==
In September 2022, Sadaqat was named in Khyber Pakhtunkhwa's squad for the 2022–23 Quaid-e-Azam Trophy. He made his first-class debut for Khyber Pakhtunkhwa on 27 October 2022, against Balochistan. On 22 November 2022, he claimed his maiden half-century in first-class cricket, scoring 91 runs and leading his team to an innings victory over Northern.

He was selected to play for City Club in the 2022–23 Dhaka Premier Division Cricket League. He made his List A debut for City Club on 28 March 2023, against Dhaka Leopards. On 5 April 2023, he scored 65 runs alongside taking 1 wicket for 45 runs against Shinepukur Cricket Club, helping City Club to win the match by 23 runs. It was his maiden List A fifty, and also the first time he had won the player of the match award in domestic cricket.

In August 2023, he was signed by Gulf Giants to play for them in the 2024 International League T20.

On 2 May 2025, he made an impression on his HBL PSL debut for Peshawar Zalmi, contributing a 33-ball 55 (including several powerful strikes) in a game-changing 102-run stand alongside Babar Azam.

On 16 November 2025, in the 2025 Asia Cup Rising Stars match between Pakistan Shaheens and India A, Maaz Sadaqat delivered a decisive all-round performance that took Pakistan A into the semi-finals: with the ball, he claimed two key wickets, helping to restrict India A to a chaseable total. He then opened the batting and dominated the run-chase with a 47-ball 79*, guiding Pakistan A to victory with an unbeaten innings marked by clean hitting and controlled aggression. His contribution was described as central to Pakistan's progression from Group B. He was declared Player of the Match. He was later designated Player of the Series for being the tournament's top-scorer (258 runs in 5 innings at an average of 129) while also getting 7 wickets (having not bowled in a match, against Sri Lanka A) with a bowling average of 7.43 and economy rate of 4.30.

Sadaqat was signed directly by Noakhali Express for the 12th edition of Bangladesh Premier League.

On 16 September 2026, Sadaqat hit his maiden T20 century off just 44 balls, scoring a match winning 112 off 49 balls in the 2026 Caribbean Premier League eliminator batting for the Jamaica Kingsmen against the Barbados Tridents. On 20 September 2026, he hit another T20 century, 114 off 58 deliveries, in the final of the tournament that his team ultimately lost.

== International career ==
In March 2026, Sadaqat made his international debut during the tour of Bangladesh. In the second ODI of the series, he was declared Player of the Match for his all-round performance, 75 (46) and 3/23. Responding to Pakistan's earlier batting collapse in the first ODI, Sadaqat adopted a far more attacking approach, striking early boundaries and hitting Nahid Rana for a six in his opening over.

In June 2026, he was named in the 15-member men's squad announced for the 2026 Asian Games. On 3 October 2026, Pakistan won the silver medal after losing in the Asian Games men’s cricket final against India at the Kōrogi Athletic Park in Nisshin, Japan.

On 9 October 2026, he hit his maiden T20I half century, off 29 deliveries, against Sri Lanka during the first match of the series at home. In the second match of the series, he narrowly missed his maiden T20I century, hitting 96 off 51 deliveries, also helping Pakistan post 215, its highest T20I score at home. He was declared Player of the Match.

== Playing style ==
Maaz Sadaqat is a left-handed batting all-rounder, capable of contributing both with the bat and slow left-arm orthodox spin. His adaptability across formats and his preference for aggressive, modern batting style combined with reliable spin make him a multi-format prospect. He considers Australian international Travis Head to be his role-model, especially in white-ball cricket.
