= Salman Ali Agha =

Pakistani cricketer (born 1993)

Personal information
- Born: 23 November 1993 (age 32); Lahore, Punjab, Pakistan
- Batting: Right-handed
- Bowling: Right-arm off break
- Role: All-rounder

International information
- National side: Pakistan (2022–present)
- Test debut (cap 247): 16 July 2022 v Sri Lanka
- Last Test: 19 August 2026 v England
- ODI debut (cap 236): 16 August 2022 v Netherlands
- Last ODI: 20 October 2026 v England
- ODI shirt no.: 67
- T20I debut (cap 117): 14 November 2024 v Australia
- Last T20I: 28 February 2026 v Sri Lanka
- T20I shirt no.: 67

Domestic team information
- Years: Team
- 2012/13: Lahore Shalimar
- 2018–2021: Lahore Qalandars
- 2024–2025: Islamabad United (squad no. 279)
- 2026: Karachi Kings (squad no. 67)

Career statistics
Competition	Test	ODI	T20I	FC
Matches	28	55	52	113
Runs scored	1,708	1,689	916	7,250
Batting average	36.34	43.30	22.90	40.50
100s/50s	3/12	4/9	0/6	19/36
Top score	132*	134	76	300*
Balls bowled	1,946	1,102	120	9,759
Wickets	20	20	6	127
Bowling average	61.15	53.25	25.33	42.49
5 wickets in innings	0	0	0	1
10 wickets in match	0	0	0	0
Best bowling	3/75	4/32	1/7	5/39
Catches/stumpings	42/–	26/–	20/–	123/–
Medal record
Men's cricket
Representing Pakistan
Asia Cup
Runner-up	2025 UAE
- Source: Cricinfo, 21 October 2026

Salman Ali Agha (born 23 November 1993) is a Pakistani international cricketer. He is a right-handed middle-order batter and a right-handed off break spin bowler. He represents the Pakistan national cricket team and previously captained the Twenty20 international side. He is also the vice-captain of the One Day international team. In domestic cricket, he plays for Southern Punjab, and for Karachi Kings in the Pakistan Super League.

He made his international debut for the Pakistan cricket team in July 2022, is currently captain of the Pakistan cricket team Twenty20 international side.

== Early life ==
Salman Ali Agha was born on 23 November 1993 in Lahore, Punjab, Pakistan into a Punjabi Muslim family. He is fluent in Punjabi and Urdu.

== Career ==
=== Domestic ===
In February 2013, he made his first-class debut after playing for Lahore's Apollo Cricket Club for many years.

In April 2018, he was named in Federal Areas' squad for the 2018 Pakistan Cup.

In June 2018, he was selected to play for the Edmonton Royals in the players' draft for the inaugural edition of the Global T20 Canada tournament. He was the leading run-scorer in the tournament for the Edmonton Royals, with 218 runs in six matches.

In September 2019, he was named in Southern Punjab's squad for the 2019–20 Quaid-e-Azam Trophy tournament.

In October 2021, he was named in the Pakistan Shaheens squad for their tour of Sri Lanka.

=== International ===
In January 2021, he was named in Pakistan's Test squad for the home series against South Africa.

In March 2021, he was again named in Pakistan's Test squad, this time for the away series against Zimbabwe.

In June 2021, Salman was named in Pakistan's One Day International (ODI) squad for the away series against England.

In June 2022, he was named in Pakistan's Test squad for the two-match away series against Sri Lanka. He made his Test debut during that series. In the second match he was noted for his 62 off 126 balls in a losing match where other batters had struggled.

In August 2022, he was named in Pakistan's ODI squad for the away series against Netherlands. He made his ODI debut during that series.

In December 2022, he scored his maiden Test hundred in the home series against New Zealand in Karachi. His innings helped Pakistan recover from a top-order collapse.

In May 2023, during the 4th ODI of the New Zealand tour of Pakistan, Agha played a key counter-attacking innings, scoring 58 runs off 43 balls to consolidate Pakistan's dominance after an early slowdown. During a brief spell of pressure, using sweep and reverse-sweep shots and decisive footwork to regain momentum. He reached his half-century off 40 balls with a straight six off Cole McConchie, also completing a 100-run partnership with Babar Azam. His aggressive batting in the middle overs turned the match in Pakistan's favor, setting the foundation for the team's total that secured the No. 1 ODI ranking for Pakistan.

In July 2023, Agha was judged Player of the Series of the away series against Sri Lanka, Pakistan winning the Test series 2-0 (2), with Agha scoring 221 runs and taking 3 wickets. In the first Test in Galle, Agha played a vital supporting innings that helped Pakistan recover from 101 for 5 to a commanding total of 461 runs. Salman's ability to counterattack and maintain scoring momentum allowed Saud Shakeel to settle and reach a double century, marking the partnership as one of the key turning points of the match. In the second Test, Agha would score an unbeaten 132* off 154 deliveries.

In November 2023, he was named in Pakistan's test squad for the away tour against Australia.

In August 2024, he was named in Pakistan's test squad for the home series against Bangladesh.

In September 2024, he was named in Pakistan’s test squad for the home series against England. In the first Test, Salman scored his third Test century with an unbeaten 104 off 119 balls and also surpassed 1,000 Test runs in the first innings at Multan. In the second Test at Multan, Agha played another crucial lower-order rescue act, scoring a counter-attacking half-century that turned a precarious position into a defendable total. Pakistan were struggling when Salman, batting with the tail, added 65 runs off 73 balls for the ninth wicket with Sajid Khan, helping extend the lead close to 300. ESPNcricinfo's Danyal Rasool described him as "Pakistan’s get-out-of-jail-free card", noting that no batter had scored more runs at No. 7 or 8 in the current WTC cycle, and highlighting his repeated habit of salvaging innings when the top order collapses. Salman's innings, marked by confident use of the sweep and a six over long-off to reach fifty, underlined his growing reputation as Pakistan's most dependable lower-order batter.

In October 2024, the Pakistan Cricket Board announced Salman as vice-captain of the Pakistan national cricket team for the white-ball formats of One Day International and Twenty20.

In December 2024, in the first ODI of the away series against South Africa, Agha produced one of his finest all-round performances for Pakistan, earning the Player-of-the-Match award. He took 4 wickets with his part-time off-spin, dismantling South Africa's top and middle order as they slumped from 70 for 0 to 88 for 4, before guiding Pakistan's chase with an unbeaten 82. Coming in at 60 for 4, Salman steadied the innings in a 141-run partnership with Saim Ayub, using patience and placement to rebuild before accelerating in the death overs. He finished the match with a composed stand alongside Naseem Shah, sealing the victory with a straight drive for four off Marco Jansen. In a gesture of sportsmanship, Salman handed his Player-of-the-Match award to Ayub, recognizing his partner's debut century.

In February 2025, during the Pakistan Tri-Nation Series, Salman scored his maiden ODI hundred against South Africa. It was a must win match against South Africa in a tri-nation series involving Pakistan, New Zealand and South Africa cricket teams. Responding to South Africa's 352, it was Pakistan's highest successful ODI chase. Agha hit 134 off 103 deliveries and also took two catches, including a one-handed dive to get rid off Matthew Breetzke who had looked dangerous. Agha was judged Player of the Series.

In August 2025, Agha led Pakistan to a 2-1 victory in the T20I away series against the West Indies in Lauderhill, Florida. Although his personal performance with the bat was modest, his leadership was crucial to the team's success. He commended his bowlers, particularly the spinners, for their key role in the series win.

In November 2025, Pakistan took a 1–0 lead in the ODI home series against Sri Lanka with a narrow six-run win in Karachi thanks to Agha's second ODI century, which rescued them from a slow start and set up a competitive total. Agha was declared Player of the Match for his 105* (87).

In February 2026, Agha was declared Player of the Series for the home T20I series against Australia, which Pakistan won 3–0, for his 120 runs, having been the Player of the Match in the second match for his 76 (40).

In March 2026, Agha scored his third ODI century in the third match of Pakistan’s away series against Bangladesh, making 109 runs off 98 balls, including nine fours and four sixes, at the Sher-e-Bangla National Stadium.

In October 2026, Agha was named Man of the Match in the first match against Sri Lanka in a home tri-series that also included England. He scored his fourth ODI century, making 107 runs off 90 balls, including 10 fours and a six, at the Rawalpindi Cricket Stadium.
