= 2026 Multan Sultans season =

Pakistani Twenty20 cricket team season

Multan Sultans
2026 season
- Coach: Tim Paine
- Playoffs: 4th place

Multan Sultans is a Pakistani professional Twenty20 franchise cricket team that will compete in 2026 Pakistan Super League. Team is based in the Multan city of Pakistan. This will be the ninth season of the Sultans

They currently coached by Tim Paine Captain for the 2026 season is not announced yet.

== History ==
In January 2025, Pakistan Cricket Board held the auction for two new teams. Sialkot Stallionz and Hyderabad Kingsmen were confirmed as the two new teams. Before the start of 2026 Pakistan Super League owners faced financial difficulties, and sold the team to CD Ventures.

After the acquisition new owner requested PCB to rebrand the franchise from Sialkot Stallionz to Multan Sultans which was accepted.

== Squad ==
Pakistan Super League introduced an auction model for the first time in 2026 season, allowing teams to select players by bidding in Pakistani rupees. Teams were also allowed to directly sign one foreign player who was not part of previous season. Stallionz chose Steve Smith as their directly signed player. Teams were also allowed to retain up to 4 players who were part of their squads in previous season while new teams were allowed to sign 4 players before auction to match with other franchises. Sialkot selected Mohammed Nawaz, Salman Mirza, Ahmed Daniyal and Saad Masood as their retentions.

Player auction for the PSL 11 was held on 11 February 2026. Following is the full squad of Sialkot Stallionz after player auction and Retentions.

== Current squad ==
Key
- Players with international caps are listed in **bold**.
- * denotes a player who is fully unavailable
- * denotes a player who will be partially unavailable

No.	Name	Nationality	Birth date	Salary	Batting style	Bowling style	Year signed	Notes
Batsmen
49	**Steve Smith**	Australia	9 June 1989 (age 37)	PKR 14.0 crore	Right-handed	Right-arm leg break	2026	
53	Jahanzaib Sultan	Pakistan	3 May 2002 (age 24)	PKR 60 lakh	Left-handed	Right-arm off break	2026	
51	**Sahibzada Farhan**	Pakistan	6 March 1996 (age 30)	PKR 5.70 crore	Right-handed	—	2026	
70	**Ashton Turner**	Australia	25 January 1993 (age 33)	PKR 4.20 crore	Right-handed	Right-arm off break	2026	
94	**Shan Masood**	Pakistan	14 October 1989 (age 37)	PKR 65 lakh	Left-handed	Right-arm medium	2026	
54	Muhammad Awais Zafar	Pakistan	10 May 2000 (age 26)	PKR 60 lakh	Right-handed	—	2026	
Wicket-keepers
11	Lachlan Shaw	Australia	26 December 2002 (age 23)	PKR 60 lakh	Right-handed	—	2026	
2	**Josh Philippe**	Australia	1 June 1997 (age 29)	PKR 2.30 crore	Right-handed	—	2026	
All-rounders
21	**Mohammad Nawaz**	Pakistan	21 March 1994 (age 32)	PKR 6.16 crore	Left-handed	Left-arm orthodox	2026	
29	Saad Masood	Pakistan	12 July 2004 (age 22)	PKR 84 lakh	Right-handed	Right-arm leg spin	2026	
66	Delano Potgieter	South Africa	5 July 1996 (age 30)	PKR 60 lakh	Left-handed	Right-arm medium	2026	
32	Mohammad Shehzad	Pakistan	5 February 2004 (age 22)	PKR 60 lakh	Right-handed	Right-arm fast-medium	2026	
Bowlers
82	**Salman Mirza**	Pakistan	1 January 1994 (age 32)	PKR 3.92 crore	Right-handed	Left-arm fast-medium	2026	
33	**Ahmed Daniyal**	Pakistan	4 August 1997 (age 29)	PKR 2.24 crore	Right-handed	Right-arm fast-medium	2026	
64	**Peter Siddle**	Australia	25 November 1984 (age 41)	PKR 2.50 crore	Right-handed	Right-arm fast-medium	2026	
26	**Tabraiz Shamsi**	South Africa	18 February 1990 (age 36)	PKR 2.20 crore	Right-handed	Left-arm unorthodox spin	2026	
13	Momin Qamar	Pakistan	4 October 2006 (age 20)	PKR 1.075 crore	Left-handed	Left-arm unorthodox spin	2026	
38	**Arshad Iqbal**	Pakistan	6 March 1996 (age 30)	PKR 60 lakh	Right-handed	Right-arm fast-medium	2026	

== Coaching staff ==
The franchise appointed former Australian Test captain Tim Paine as their head coach.

- Head Coach: Tim Paine
- Bowling Coach: Sohail Tanvir

== Team standings ==
Pos	Team	Pld	W	L	NR	Pts	NRR	Qualification
1	Peshawar Zalmi (C)	10	8	1	1	17	2.324	Advanced to the Qualifier
2	Islamabad United (3rd)	10	6	3	1	13	1.667	Advanced to the Qualifier
3	Multan Sultans (4th)	10	6	4	0	12	0.326	Advanced to the Eliminator 1
4	Hyderabad Kingsmen (R)	10	5	5	0	10	−0.361	Advanced to the Eliminator 1
5	Lahore Qalandars	10	5	5	0	10	−0.482	Eliminated
6	Karachi Kings	10	5	5	0	10	−0.869	Eliminated
7	Quetta Gladiators	10	3	7	0	6	−0.410	Eliminated
8	Rawalpindiz	10	1	9	0	2	−1.760	Eliminated

Source: ESPNcricinfo

Notes

- C = Champions;
- R = Runners-up;
- (x) = Position at the end of the tournament;

== Fixtures ==
Match 4
28 March 2026
19:00 (N)
Scorecard

Islamabad United; 171/8 (20 overs)	v	Multan Sultans; 175/5 (18.4 overs)
Mark Chapman 40 (21); Momin Qamar 3/24 (3 overs)		Josh Philippe 55 (35); Salman Irshad 2/28 (4 overs)

Multan Sultans won by 5 wickets.
Gaddafi Stadium, Lahore
Umpires: Sharfuddoula (Ban) and Ahsan Raza (Pak)
Player of the match: Momin Qamar (Multan Sultans)

- Multan Sultans won the toss and elected to field.

Match 8
1 April 2026
19:00 (N)
Scorecard

Hyderabad Kingsmen; 225/5 (20 overs)	v	Multan Sultans; 227/4 (18.4 overs)
Maaz Sadaqat 62 (26); Mohammad Wasim Jr. 2/37 (4 overs)		Sahibzada Farhan 106* (57); Saim Ayub 2/43 (3 overs)

Multan Sultans won by 6 wickets
Gaddafi Stadium, Lahore
Umpires: Asif Yaqoob (Pak) and Chris Gaffaney (NZ)
Player of the match: Sahibzada Farhan (Multan Sultans)

- Hyderabad Kingsmen won the toss and elected to bat.

Match 11
3 April 2026
19:00 (N)
Scorecard

Lahore Qalandars; 185/5 (13 overs)	v	Multan Sultans; 165/5 (13 overs)
Mohammad Naeem 60 (28); Muhammad Ismail 2/47 (3 overs)		Ashton Turner 52* (22); Mustafizur Rahman 2/37 (3 overs)

Lahore Qalandars won by 20 runs
Gaddafi Stadium, Lahore
Umpires: Chris Gaffaney (NZ) and Tariq Rasheed (Pak)
Player of the match: Mohammad Naeem (Lahore Qalandars)

- Multan Sultans won the toss and elected to field.
- The match was reduced to 13 overs per side due to rain.

Match 13
5 April 2026
19:00 (N)
Scorecard

Quetta Gladiators; 166/7 (20 overs)	v	Multan Sultans; 167/4 (17.3 overs)
Saud Shakeel 56 (41); Mohammad Nawaz 3/30 (4 overs)		Steve Smith 53 (35); Hassan Nawaz 2/17 (2 overs)

Multan Sultans won by 6 wickets
Gaddafi Stadium, Lahore
Umpires: Chris Gaffaney (NZ) and Faisal Afridi (Pak)
Player of the match: Mohammad Nawaz (Multan Sultans)

- Multan Sultans won the toss and elected to field.

Match 14
6 April 2026
19:00 (N)
Scorecard

Rawalpindiz; 182/8 (20 overs)	v	Multan Sultans; 186/3 (16.2 overs)
Sam Billings 56* (41); Faisal Akram 4/31 (4 overs)		Sahibzada Farhan 68 (38); Mohammad Amir 2/32 (3 overs)

Multan Sultans won by 7 wickets
Gaddafi Stadium, Lahore
Umpires: Abdul Muqeet (Pak) and Sharfuddoula (Ban)
Player of the match: Faisal Akram (Multan Sultans)

- Multan Sultans won the toss and elected to field.

Match 22
13 April 2026
19:00 (N)
Scorecard

Peshawar Zalmi; 196/6 (20 overs)	v	Multan Sultans; 172/8 (20 overs)
Kusal Mendis 68 (40); Muhammad Ismail 2/22 (3 overs)		Shan Masood 35 (19); Sufiyan Muqeem 3/30 (4 overs)

Peshawar Zalmi won by 24 runs
National Bank Stadium, Karachi
Umpires: Alex Wharf (Eng) and Rashid Riaz (Pak)
Player of the match: Sufiyan Muqeem (Peshawar Zalmi)

- Multan Sultans won the toss and elected to field.

Match 28
19 April 2026
14:30
Scorecard

Karachi Kings; 207/7 (20 overs)	v	Multan Sultans; 196 (19.4 overs)
Shan Masood 46 (25); Khushdil Shah 3/35 (4 overs)		Reeza Hendricks 49 (32); Arafat Minhas 3/32 (3 overs)

Multan Sultans won by 11 runs
National Bank Stadium, Karachi
Umpires: Asif Yaqoob (Pak) and Chris Gaffaney (NZ)
Player of the match: Arafat Minhas (Multan Sultans)

- Karachi Kings won the toss and elected to field.

Match 31
21 April 2026
19:00 (N)
Scorecard

Rawalpindiz; 166/4 (20 overs)	v	Multan Sultans; 167/4 (18.4 overs)
Daryl Mitchell 58 (46); Mohammad Imran 1/9 (3 overs)		Steve Smith 56 (31); Asif Afridi 2/28 (4 overs)

Multan Sultans won by 6 wickets
National Bank Stadium, Karachi
Umpires: Rashid Riaz (Pak) and Sharfuddoula (Ban)
Player of the match: Steve Smith (Multan Sultans)

- Rawalpindiz won the toss and elected to bat.

Match 33
22 April 2026
19:00 (N)
Scorecard

Multan Sultans; 213/7 (20 overs)	v	Hyderabad Kingsmen; 214/6 (19.3 overs)
Steve Smith 106 (50); Akif Javed 3/30 (4 overs)		Usman Khan 101 (47); Peter Siddle 3/39 (4 overs)

Hyderabad Kingsmen won by 4 wickets
National Bank Stadium, Karachi
Umpires: Chris Gaffaney (NZ) and Zulfiqar Jan (Pak)
Player of the match: Usman Khan (Hyderabad Kingsmen)

- Hyderabad Kingsmen won the toss and elected to field.
- Steve Smith (Multan Sultans) scored his maiden century in Pakistan Super League.
- Usman Khan (Hyderabad Kingsmen) scored his fourth century in Pakistan Super League, the most by any batter.

Match 40
26 April 2026
19:00 (N)
Scorecard

Multan Sultans; 192/7 (20 overs)	v	Islamabad United; 193/6 (20 overs)
Shan Masood 44 (33); Faheem Ashraf 1/23 (3 overs)		Mark Chapman 69* (33); Faisal Akram 2/41 (4 overs)

Islamabad United won by 4 wickets
National Bank Stadium, Karachi
Umpires: Rashid Riaz (Pak) and Sharfuddoula (Ban)
Player of the match: Mark Chapman (Islamabad United)

- Islamabad United won the toss and elected to field.
