= Cricket at the 2026 Asian Games – Men's tournament =

Cricket tournament

Men's cricket event at the 2026 Asian Games
- Venue: Kōrogi Sports Park
- Location: Nisshin, Japan
- Dates: 24 September – 3 October
- Nations: 10

Medalists
gold medal	India
silver medal	Pakistan
bronze medal	Sri Lanka

The Men's cricket event was a part of the 2026 Asian Games which was played from 24 September to 3 October 2026 at the Kōrogi Sports Park in Aichi Prefecture, Nisshin, Japan. A total of 10 teams participated with the matches played in Twenty-20 format.

All the quarter-final matches were abandoned without the toss, due to rain with Pakistan, India, Sri Lanka and Bangladesh advancing to the semi-finals, being the higher ranked sides against their respective opponents.

India defended its gold medal after defeating Pakistan by 19 runs, and Sri Lanka secured the bronze after defeating Bangladesh by 63 runs.

== Participating nations ==
On 28 April 2025, the organizing committee approved the inclusion of cricket and mixed martial arts to the programme, following a request from OCA. The tournament featured 10 nations.

Mode of Qualification	Date	Hosts	Berths	Qualified teams
Host country	—N/a		1	Japan
ICC Full Members	—N/a		5	Afghanistan; Bangladesh; India; Pakistan; Sri Lanka
2026 Asian Games Qualifier	31 May – 8 June 2026	Singapore	4	Hong Kong; Malaysia; Nepal; Oman
Total			10	

=== Draw ===
The seeds were determined based on the ICC Men's T20I Team Rankings as of 23 July 2026, followed by an official draw on the same day to allocate the preliminary stage groups and knockout stage bracket.

== Format ==
The six lowest-seeded teams were placed into two groups of three through an official team draw for the preliminary stage, played in a single round-robin format from September 24 to September 26. The top two teams from each group advance to the quarter-finals, where they join the four highest-seeded teams who received automatic byes based on their ICC rankings.

The knockouts then proceed through the quarter-finals and semi-finals, culminating in the gold medal match played between the semi-final winners, with the semi-final losers competing in the bronze medal match from September 28 to October 3.

== Squads ==
Afghanistan	Bangladesh	Hong Kong	India	Japan
Darwish Rasooli (c); Abdullah Ahmadzai; Mohammad Akram; Ismat Alam; Faridoon Dawoodzai; Hassan Eisakhil; Mohammad Ishaq (wk); Karim Janat; Faisal Shinozada; Nangialai Kharoti; Imran Mir; Arab Gul Momand; Farmanullah Safi; Khalid Taniwal; Najibullah Zadran	Litton Das (c); Tawhid Hridoy (vc); Nasum Ahmed; Yasir Ali; Parvez Hossain Emon; Mahedi Hasan; Tanzid Hasan; Saif Hassan; Mosaddek Hossain; Rishad Hossain; Aliss Islam (Note: Mohammad Saifuddin was withdrawn due to injury and was replaced by Aliss Islam.); Shoriful Islam; Hasan Mahmud; Mustafizur Rahman; ~~Mohammad Saifuddin~~; Najmul Hossain Shanto	Yasim Murtaza (c); Babar Hayat (vc); Anas Khan; Anshy Rath; Shiv Mathur; Shahid Wasif; Hafeez Khan; Nasrulla Rana; Nizakat Khan; Rajab Hussain; Ehsan Khan; Mohammad Ghazanfar; Mohammad Waheed; Ayush Shukla; Mohammad Hassan Khan	Shreyas Iyer (c); Tilak Varma (vc); Ravi Bishnoi; Jasprit Bumrah; ~~Varun Chakravarthy~~ (Note: Varun Chakravarthy was withdrawn due to injury and was replaced by Vipraj Nigam.); Shivam Dube; Ishan Kishan (wk); Vipraj Nigam; Axar Patel; ~~Harshit Rana~~ (Note: Harshit Rana was withdrawn due to injury and replaced by Yash Thakur.); ~~Nitish Kumar Reddy~~ (Note: Nitish Kumar Reddy was withdrawn from the Asian Games squad and added to the squad for India's home series against West Indies.); Sanju Samson (wk); Abhishek Sharma; Arshdeep Singh; Washington Sundar; Vaibhav Sooryavanshi; Yash Thakur	Kendel Kadowaki-Fleming (c); Charlie Hara-Hinze; Benjamin Ito-Davis; Alester Kadowaki-Fleming; Kohei Kubota; Jake Kusuda-Nairn; Wataru Miyauchi (wk); Reo Sakurano-Thomas; Alex Shirai-Patmore (wk); Shoma Sugaya-Slater; Declan Suzuki; Tsuyoshi Takada; Ibrahim Takahashi; Makoto Taniyama; Lachlan Yamamoto-Lake
Malaysia	Nepal	Oman	Pakistan	Sri Lanka
Syed Aziz (c); Ainool Hafizs (wk); Muhamad Syahadat; Muhammad Amir; Virandeep Singh; Pavandeep Singh; Muhammad Haziq Aiman; Sharvin Muniandy; Muhammad Akram; Muhammad Wafiq; Vijay Unni; Azri Azhar; Amir Khan; Aslam Khan; Rahim Khan	Dipendra Singh Airee (c); Lokesh Bam (wk); Kushal Bhurtel; Gulshan Jha; Sundeep Jora; Sompal Kami; Karan KC; Sandeep Lamichhane; Kushal Malla; Sher Malla; Rohit Paudel; Lalit Rajbanshi; Aarif Sheikh; Aasif Sheikh (wk); Nandan Yadav	Sufyan Mehmood (c); Muzaffar Shiralkar (vc, wk); Faris Al Balushi; Issa Al Balushi; Mohammed Al Balushi; Nawed Al Balushi; Qais Al Balushi; Shuaib Al Balushi; Waheed Al Balushi; Wasim Al Balushi; Zubair Al Balushi; Abdul Jalil (wk); Mohammed Othman; Sameer Othman; Ahmed Al Zadjali	Sahibzada Farhan (c); Abdul Samad (vc); Abrar Ahmed; Haider Ali; Saim Ayub; Ahmed Daniyal; Akif Javed; Usman Khan (wk); Arafat Minhas; ~~Salman Mirza~~ (Note: Salman Mirza was withdrawn from the squad due to injury and was replaced by Mohammad Wasim.); Saad Masood; Sufyan Moqim; Hasan Nawaz; Ali Raza; Maaz Sadaqat; Mohammad Wasim Jr.	Sahan Arachchige (c); Ashen Bandara; Lasith Croospulle; Keshan de Livera; Niroshan Dickwella (wk); Binura Fernando; Nuwanidu Fernando; Tharindu Hansaka; Dushan Hemantha; Sineth Jayawardena; Chamika Karunaratne; Pramod Madushan; Wanuja Sahan; Nuwan Thushara; Vijayakanth Viyaskanth

== Group stage ==
The fixtures of the tournament were announced on 26 August 2026 to determine the preliminary stage and the knockout stage fixtures.

=== Group A ===
Pos	Team	Pld	W	L	T	NR	Pts	NRR	Qualification
1	Nepal	2	1	0	0	1	3	0.842	Advanced to the knockout stage
2	Afghanistan	2	1	1	0	0	2	0.846	Advanced to the knockout stage
3	Japan (H)	2	0	1	0	1	1	−2.400	Eliminated

Source: Cricinfo
(H) Host

Match 1
24 September 2026
09:00
Scorecard

Afghanistan; 129/6 (20 overs)	v	Japan; 81 (19.3 overs)
Mohammad Akram 34 (29); Shoma Sugaya-Slater 2/18 (3 overs)		Reo Sakurano-Thomas 23 (24); Arab Gul 4/8 (4 overs)

Afghanistan won by 48 runs
Kōrogi Sports Park, Nisshin
Umpires: Faisal Afridi (Pak) and Nitin Menon (Ind)

- Japan won the toss and elected to field.

Match 3
25 September 2026
14:00
Scorecard

Afghanistan; 102/7 (20 overs)	v	Nepal; 103/5 (17.2 overs)
Faisal Shinozada 30 (33); Kushal Bhurtel 4/21 (4 overs)		Sundeep Jora 34 (35); Faridoon Dawoodzai 1/10 (3 overs)

Nepal won by 5 wickets
Kōrogi Sports Park, Nisshin
Umpires: Viswanadan Kalidas (Mas) and Gazi Sohel (Ban)

- Afghanistan won the toss and elected to bat.

Match 5
26 September 2026
09:00
Scorecard

Nepal; 149/4 (15 overs)	v	Japan
Sundeep Jora 57* (32); Reo Sakurano-Thomas 1/7 (2 overs)

No result
Kōrogi Sports Park, Nisshin
Umpires: Faisal Afridi (Pak) and Prageeth Rambukwella (SL)

- Japan won the toss and elected to field.
- The match was reduced to 15 overs per side due to rain.
- No further play was possible due to rain.

=== Group B ===
Pos	Team	Pld	W	L	T	NR	Pts	NRR	Qualification
1	Malaysia	2	1	0	0	1	3	2.950	Advanced to the knockout stage
2	Hong Kong	2	1	1	0	0	2	−0.075	Advanced to the knockout stage
3	Oman	2	0	1	0	1	1	−2.050	Eliminated

Source: Cricinfo

Match 2
24 September 2026
14:00
Scorecard

Hong Kong; 81/9 (20 overs)	v	Malaysia; 84/2 (12 overs)
Shiv Mathur 29 (39); Pavandeep Singh 3/11 (4 overs)		Muhamad Syahadat 36* (32); Nasrulla Rana 2/23 (3 overs)

Malaysia won by 8 wickets
Kōrogi Sports Park, Nisshin
Umpires: Prageeth Rambukwella (SL) and Gazi Sohel (Ban)

- Hong Kong won the toss and elected to bat.

Match 4
25 September 2026
09:00
Scorecard

Hong Kong; 121/8 (20 overs)	v	Oman; 80/6 (20 overs)
Hafeez Khan 33 (37); Mohammed Al Balushi 3/17 (4 overs)		Sufyan Mehmood 26* (35); Ayush Shukla 3/23 (4 overs)

Hong Kong won by 41 runs
Kōrogi Sports Park, Nisshin
Umpires: Faisal Afridi (Pak) and Viswanadan Kalidas (Mas)

- Hong Kong won the toss and elected to bat.

Match 6
26 September 2026
14:00
Scorecard

Malaysia	v	Oman

Match abandoned
Kōrogi Sports Park, Nisshin
Umpires: Nitin Menon (Ind) and Chris Thurgate (Jpn)

- No toss.
- No play was possible due to rain.

== Knockout stage ==
=== Bracket ===
Quarter-finals
28 September – Nisshin
Pakistan	Abandoned
Hong Kong	Abandoned
29 September – Nisshin
Bangladesh	Abandoned
Malaysia	Abandoned
28 September – Nisshin
Afghanistan	Abandoned
India	Abandoned
29 September – Nisshin
Nepal	Abandoned
Sri Lanka	Abandoned

Semi-finals
1 October – Nisshin
Pakistan	112/4 (11.3)
Bangladesh	111/7 (13)
1 October – Nisshin
India	169/7 (20)
Sri Lanka	45 (9.5)

Gold medal match
3 October – Nisshin
Pakistan (silver)	192/6 (20)
India (gold)	211/6 (20)
Bronze medal match
3 October – Nisshin
Bangladesh	102 (17.3)
Sri Lanka (bronze)	165/9 (20)

=== Quarterfinals ===
Quarterfinal 1
28 September 2026
09:00
Scorecard

Hong Kong	v	Pakistan

Match abandoned
Kōrogi Sports Park, Nisshin
Umpires: Viswanadan Kalidas (Mas) and Prageeth Rambukwella (SL)

- No toss.
- No play was possible due to rain.
- Pakistan advanced by virtue of being the higher-seeded team.

Quarterfinal 2
28 September 2026
14:00
Scorecard

Afghanistan	v	India

Match abandoned
Kōrogi Sports Park, Nisshin
Umpires: Prageeth Rambukwella (SL) and Gazi Sohel (Ban)

- No toss.
- No play was possible due to rain.
- India advanced by virtue of being the higher-seeded team.

Quarterfinal 3
29 September 2026
09:00
Scorecard

Nepal	v	Sri Lanka

Match abandoned
Kōrogi Sports Park, Nisshin
Umpires: Nitin Menon (Ind) and Gazi Sohel (Ban)

- No toss.
- No play was possible due to rain.
- Sri Lanka advanced by virtue of being the higher-seeded team.

Quarterfinal 4
29 September 2026
14:00
Scorecard

Bangladesh	v	Malaysia

Match abandoned
Kōrogi Sports Park, Nisshin
Umpires: Faisal Afridi (Pak) and Farooq Khan (Afg)

- No toss.
- No play was possible due to rain.
- Bangladesh advanced by virtue of being the higher-seeded team.

=== Semifinals ===
Semifinal 1
1 October 2026
09:00
Scorecard

Bangladesh; 111/7 (13 overs)	v	Pakistan; 112/4 (11.3 overs)
Towhid Hridoy 42 (25); Sufyan Moqim 3/26 (3 overs)		Abdul Samad 30* (15); Rishad Hossain 1/12 (2.3 overs)

Pakistan won by 6 wickets
Kōrogi Sports Park, Nisshin
Umpires: Prageeth Rambukwella (SL) and Nitin Menon (Ind)

- Pakistan won the toss and elected to field.
- The match was reduced to 13 overs per side due to wet outfield.
- Sahibzada Farhan captained Pakistan for the first time in T20Is.

Semifinal 2
1 October 2026
14:00
Scorecard

India; 169/7 (20 overs)	v	Sri Lanka; 45 (9.5 overs)
Ishan Kishan 80* (46); Sahan Arachchige 2/28 (4 overs)		Nuwanidu Fernando 15 (11); Abhishek Sharma 2/2 (0.5 over)

India won by 124 runs
Kōrogi Sports Park, Nisshin
Umpires: Faisal Afridi (Pak) and Gazi Sohel (Ban)

- Sri Lanka won the toss and elected to field.
- Sohan de Livera, Sineth Jayawardena and Wanuja Sahan (SL) all made their T20I debuts.
- This was Sri Lanka's lowest total in T20Is.

=== Bronze medal match ===
3 October 2026
09:00
Scorecard

Sri Lanka; 165/9 (20 overs)	v	Bangladesh; 102 (17.3 overs)
Tharindu Rathnayake 65 (32); Mahedi Hasan 2/19 (4 overs)		Nasum Ahmed 26 (28); Wanuja Sahan 2/17 (4 overs)

Sri Lanka won by 63 runs
Kōrogi Sports Park, Nisshin
Umpires: Faisal Afridi (Pak) and Nitin Menon (Ind)

- Sri Lanka won the toss and elected to bat.
- Aliss Islam (Ban) made his T20I debut.

=== Gold medal match ===
3 October 2026
14:00
Scorecard

India; 211/6 (20 overs)	v	Pakistan; 192/6 (20 overs)
Abhishek Sharma 61 (28); Arafat Minhas 2/25 (3 overs)		Hassan Nawaz 96 (51); Axar Patel 2/29 (4 overs); Washington Sundar 2/29 (4 overs)

India won by 19 runs
Kōrogi Sports Park, Nisshin
Umpires: Prageeth Rambukwella (SL) and Gazi Sohel (Ban)

- India won the toss and elected to bat.
- Saad Masood (Pak) made his T20I debut.

== Final standing ==
Rank	Team	Pld	W	L	T	NR
1st place, gold medalist(s)	India	3	2	0	0	1
2nd place, silver medalist(s)	Pakistan	3	1	1	0	1
3rd place, bronze medalist(s)	Sri Lanka	3	1	1	0	1
4	Bangladesh	3	0	2	0	1
5	Malaysia	3	1	0	0	2
6	Nepal	3	1	0	0	2
7	Afghanistan	3	1	1	0	1
8	Hong Kong	3	1	1	0	1
9	Oman	2	0	1	0	1
10	Japan	2	0	1	0	1

== See also ==
- 2026 Asian Games – Men's Qualifier
- 2026 Asian Games – Women's Qualifier
- 2026 Asian Games – Women's tournament
- Cricket at the 2026 Asian Games
- 2026 Asian Games
