= 2025 Pakistan Super League final =

Cricket match

- Event: 2025 Pakistan Super League
Quetta Gladiators	Lahore Qalandars
Quetta Gladiators team colors	Lahore Qalandars team colours
201/9	204/4
20 overs	19.5 overs
- Lahore Qalandars won by 6 wickets
- Date: 25 May 2025
- Venue: Gaddafi Stadium, Lahore
- Player of the match: Kusal Perera (Lahore Qalandars)
- Umpires: Rashid Riaz; Asif Yaqoob

The 2025 Pakistan Super League final was a Twenty20 cricket match played between Lahore Qalandars and Quetta Gladiators to decide the champion of the 2025 season of the Pakistan Super League (PSL) on 25 May 2025 at the Gaddafi Stadium in Lahore, Pakistan.

Lahore Qalandars won the match by 6 wickets, to win their third PSL title.

== Route to the final ==
League progression
Team	Group matches										Playoffs		
Team	1	2	3	4	5	6	7	8	9	10	Q1/E	Q2	F
Quetta Gladiators	2	2	2	4	6	8	9	11	13	15	W		L
Lahore Qalandars	0	2	4	4	4	6	8	9	11	13	W	W	W

Win	Loss	No result

- Note: The total points at the end of each group match are listed.
- Note: Click on the points (group matches) or W/L (playoffs) to see the match summary.

=== Group stage ===
Quetta Gladiators finished at the top of the 2025 Pakistan Super League group stage with 15 points, followed by Islamabad United and Karachi Kings, who each accumulated 12 points. Lahore Qalandars secured the fourth and final playoff position with 11 points.

=== Playoffs ===
In the qualifier on 21 May 2025, Quetta Gladiators defeated Islamabad United by 30 runs to reach into their fourth PSL final.

In the first eliminator on 22 May 2025, Lahore Qalandars beat Karachi Kings by 6 wickets and progressed into the second eliminator.

In the second eliminator on 23 May 2025, Lahore Qalandars defeated Islamabad United by 95 runs to reach their fourth PSL final. These results led to a final matchup between Quetta Gladiators and Lahore Qalandars.

== Match officials ==
- On-field umpires: Rashid Riaz and Asif Yaqoob
- TV umpire: Faisal Afridi
- Reserve umpire: Abdul Muqeet
- Match referee: Roshan Mahanama

== Match ==
Final
25 May 2025
19:30 (N)
Scorecard

Quetta Gladiators; 201/9 (20 overs)	v	Lahore Qalandars; 204/4 (19.5 overs)
Hassan Nawaz 76 (43); Shaheen Afridi 3/24 (4 overs)		Kusal Perera 62* (31); Abrar Ahmed 1/27 (4 overs)

Lahore Qalandars won by 6 wickets
Gaddafi Stadium, Lahore
Umpires: Rashid Riaz (Pak) and Asif Yaqoob (Pak)
Player of the match: Kusal Perera (Lahore Qalandars)

- Quetta Gladiators won the toss and elected to bat.
- By winning in the final, Lahore Qalandars became the most successful team alongside Islamabad United in PSL history.

=== Scorecard ===
Toss: Quetta Gladiators won the toss and elected to bat.

Quetta Gladiators batting
Player	Status	Runs	Balls	4s	6s	Strike rate
Saud Shakeel	c †Perera b Afridi	4	6	0	0	66.66
Finn Allen	c Rauf b Mirza	12	11	2	0	109.09
Rilee Rossouw	c Afridi b Raza	22	11	4	1	200.00
Hassan Nawaz	c Raza b Afridi	76	43	8	4	176.74
Avishka Fernando	c Afridi b Hossain	29	22	5	0	131.81
Dinesh Chandimal	c sub (Azab) b Afridi	22	13	0	2	169.23
Faheem Ashraf	c Naeem b Mirza	28	8	2	3	350.00
Mohammad Amir	b Rauf	0	2	0	0	0.00
Abrar Ahmed	c Afridi b Rauf	0	1	0	0	0.00
Khurram Shahzad	not out	2	3	0	0	66.66
Usman Tariq	did not bat					
Extras 6 (wd 6); Total 201/9 (20 overs)				21	10	10.05 RR

Fall of wickets: 1/17 (Shakeel, 2.4 ov), 2/21 (Allen, 3.1 ov), 3/58 (Rossouw, 6.2 ov), 4/125 (Fernando, 12.5 ov), 5/171 (Chandimal, 17.2 ov), 6/172 (H. Nawaz, 17.5 ov), 7/173 (Amir, 18.2 ov), 8/173 (Abrar, 18.3), 9/201 (Ashraf, 19.6 ov)

Lahore Qalandars bowling
Bowler	Overs	Maidens	Runs	Wickets	Econ	Wides	NBs
Shaheen Afridi	4	0	24	3	6.00	2	0
Salman Mirza	4	0	51	2	12.75	0	0
Haris Rauf	4	0	41	2	10.25	2	0
Sikandar Raza	4	0	43	1	10.75	0	0
Rishad Hossain	4	0	42	1	10.50	0	0

Target: 202 runs from 20 overs at 10.10 RR

Lahore Qalandars batting
Player	Status	Runs	Balls	4s	6s	Strike rate
Fakhar Zaman	lbw b Abrar	11	10	2	0	110.00
Mohammad Naeem	c Fernando b Ashraf	46	27	1	6	170.37
Abdullah Shafique	c Shahzad b Tariq	41	28	4	1	146.42
Kusal Perera	not out	62	31	5	4	200.00
Bhanuka Rajapaksa	c Fernando b Amir	14	16	1	1	87.50
Sikandar Raza	not out	22	7	2	2	314.28
Shaheen Afridi						
Muhammad Akhlaq						
Rishad Hossain						
Haris Rauf						
Salman Mirza						
Extras 8 (lb3, wd 5); Total 202/4 (19.5 overs)				15	14	10.28 RR

Fall of wickets: 1/39 (Fakhar, 3.2 ov), 2/85 (Naeem, 8.4 ov), 3/115 (Shafique, 12.3 ov), 4/145 (Rajapaksa, 16.4 ov)

Quetta Gladiators bowling
Bowler	Overs	Maidens	Runs	Wickets	Econ	Wides	NBs
Mohammad Amir	4	0	41	1	10.25	2	0
Khurram Shahzad	4	0	46	0	11.50	1	0
Faheem Ashraf	3.5	0	49	1	12.78	1	0
Abrar Ahmed	4	0	27	1	6.75	0	0
Usman Tariq	4	0	38	1	9.50	1	0

Result: Lahore Qalandars won by 6 wickets
