= 2026 Peshawar Zalmi season =

2026 season of Peshawar Zalmi

Peshawar Zalmi
2026 season
- Coach: Ottis Gibson
- Captain: Babar Azam
- Ground(s): Imran Khan Cricket Stadium
- Final: Champions

Peshawar Zalmi is a Pakistani professional Twenty20 franchise cricket team based in Peshawar, Pakistan, that competed in the 2026 Pakistan Super League. It was the team's eleventh consecutive season in the Pakistan Super League after renewing its franchise agreement for another decade in December 2025. Peshawar were coached by Ottis Gibson and captained by Babar Azam.

Peshawar finished the league stage at the top of the points table and qualified for the final after defeating Islamabad United in the Qualifier. They won their second Pakistan Super League title by defeating Hyderabad Kingsmen by five wickets in the 2026 Pakistan Super League final, played on 3 May 2026 at Gaddafi Stadium, Lahore.

== Squad ==
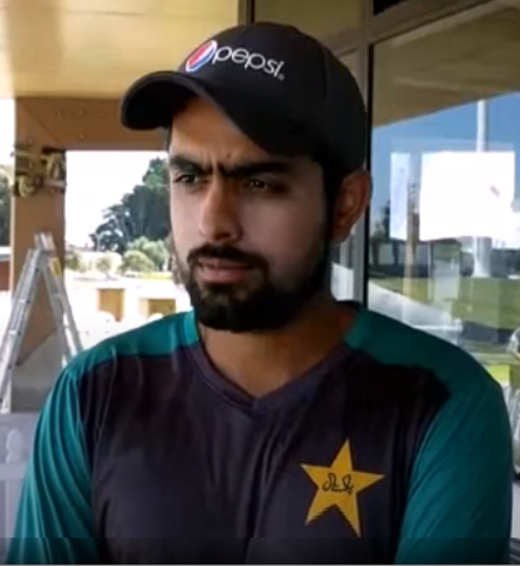
Babar Azam was the captain and top scorer for the team in 2026.

Pakistan Super League introduced an auction model for the first time in the 2026 season, allowing teams to select players by bidding in Pakistani rupees. Teams were also allowed to directly sign one foreign player who was not part of previous season. Zalmi's signed Aaron Hardie as their directly signed player. Teams were also allowed to retain up to 4 players who were part of their squads in previous seasons, while new teams were allowed to sign 4 players before the auction to match with other franchises. Peshawar retained Babar Azam, Abdul Samad, Sufiyan Muqeem and Ali Raza from their squad.

Player auction for the PSL 11 was held on 11 February 2026. Following is the full squad of Peshawar Zalmi after the player auction and retentions.

Key
- Players with international caps are listed in **bold**.
- * denotes a player who is fully unavailable
- * denotes a player who will be partially unavailable

No.	Name	Nationality	Birth date	Salary	Batting style	Bowling style	Year signed	Notes
Batsmen
56	**Babar Azam**	Pakistan	15 October 1994 (age 32)	PKR 7.0 crore	Right-handed	Right-arm off break	2022	Captain
45	**Abdul Samad**	Pakistan	25 January 1998 (age 28)	PKR 2.8 crore	Right-handed	Right-arm leg break	2025	
14	**James Vince**	England	14 March 1991 (age 35)	PKR 3.00 crore	Right-handed	Right-arm medium pace	2026	
97	**Tanzid Hasan**	Bangladesh	1 December 2000 (age 25)	PKR 1.1 crore	Left-handed	left-arm medium pace	2026	
45	**Mirza Tahir Baig**	Pakistan	15 October 1998 (age 28)	PKR 60 lakh	Right-handed	Right-arm medium pace	2026	
Wicket-keepers
29	**Mohammad Haris**	Pakistan	30 March 2001 (age 25)	PKR 2.20 crore	Right-handed	—	2026	
14	**Kusal Mendis**	Sri Lanka	2 February 1995 (age 31)	PKR 4.20 crore	Right-handed	—	2026	
All-rounders
20	**Aaron Hardie**	Australia	7 January 1999 (age 27)	PKR	Right-handed	Right-arm medium-fast	2026	
4	**Michael Bracewell**	New Zealand	14 February 1991 (age 35)	PKR 4.20 crore	Left-handed	Right-arm off break	2026	
95	**Iftikhar Ahmed**	Pakistan	3 September 1990 (age 36)	PKR 1.80 crore	Right-handed	Right-arm off break	2026	
65	**Aamir Jamal**	Pakistan	5 July 1996 (age 30)	PKR 1.90 crore	Right-handed	Right-arm medium-fast	2026	
7	Khalid Usman	Pakistan	20 May 1986 (age 40)	PKR 60 lakh	Right-handed	Slow left arm orthodox	2026	
Bowlers
82	**Sufiyan Muqeem**	Pakistan	15 November 1999 (age 26)	PKR 4.48 crore	Left-handed	Left-arm unorthodox	2023	
11	Ali Raza	Pakistan	18 March 2008 (age 18)	PKR 1.96 crore	Right-handed	Right-arm medium-fast	2025	
23	Abdul Subhan	Pakistan	14 October 2004 (age 22)	PKR 62.5 lakh	Right-handed	Right-arm medium-fast	2026	
49	**Khurram Shahzad**	Pakistan	1 October 1999 (age 27)	PKR 2.70 crore	Right-handed	Right-arm fast-medium	2026	
45	**Nahid Rana**	Bangladesh	2 October 2002 (age 24)	PKR 60 lakh	Right-handed	Right-arm fast	2026	
—	Kashif Ali	Pakistan	N/A	PKR 60 lakh	N/A	N/A	2026	
26	**Shahnawaz Dahani**	Pakistan	5 August 1998 (age 28)	PKR 60 lakh	Right-handed	Right-arm fast-medium	2026	
47	**Shoriful Islam**	Bangladesh	3 June 2001 (age 25)	PKR 1.1 Crore	Left-handed	Left-arm fast-medium	2026	

== Coaching and management staff ==
- Head Coach: Ottis Gibson
- Batting Coach: Misbah-ul-Haq
- Director of Cricket: Mohammad Akram

== Season standings ==
=== Points table ===
Pos	Team	Pld	W	L	NR	Pts	NRR	Qualification
1	Peshawar Zalmi (C)	10	8	1	1	17	2.324	Advanced to the Qualifier
2	Islamabad United (3rd)	10	6	3	1	13	1.667	Advanced to the Qualifier
3	Multan Sultans (4th)	10	6	4	0	12	0.326	Advanced to the Eliminator 1
4	Hyderabad Kingsmen (R)	10	5	5	0	10	−0.361	Advanced to the Eliminator 1
5	Lahore Qalandars	10	5	5	0	10	−0.482	Eliminated
6	Karachi Kings	10	5	5	0	10	−0.869	Eliminated
7	Quetta Gladiators	10	3	7	0	6	−0.410	Eliminated
8	Rawalpindiz	10	1	9	0	2	−1.760	Eliminated

Source: ESPNcricinfo

Notes

- C = Champions;
- R = Runners-up;
- (x) = Position at the end of the tournament;

=== League progression ===
League progression
Team	Group matches										Playoffs		
Team	1	2	3	4	5	6	7	8	9	10	Q1/E	Q2	F
Peshawar Zalmi	2	3	5	7	9	11	13	15	17	17	W		W

Win	Loss	No result

- Note: The total points at the end of each group match are listed.
- Note: Click on the points (group matches) or W/L (playoffs) to see the match summary.

== Fixtures ==
=== League stage ===
Match 3
28 March 2026
14:30
Scorecard

Rawalpindiz; 214/4 (20 overs)	v	Peshawar Zalmi; 218/5 (19.1 overs)
Yasir Khan 83 (46); Ali Raza 2/42 (3 overs)		Mohammad Haris 47 (28); Amad Butt 2/45 (4 overs)

Peshawar Zalmi won by 5 wickets.
Gaddafi Stadium, Lahore
Umpires: Alex Wharf (Eng) and Faisal Afridi (Pak)
Player of the match: Michael Bracewell (Peshawar Zalmi)

- Rawalpindiz won the toss and elected to bat.

Match 7
31 March 2026
19:00 (N)
Scorecard

Islamabad United	v	Peshawar Zalmi

Match abandoned
Gaddafi Stadium, Lahore
Umpires: Ahsan Raza (Pak) and Asif Yaqoob (Pak)

- No toss.
- No play was possible due to rain.

Match 15
8 April 2026
19:00 (N)
Scorecard

Hyderabad Kingsmen; 145 (18.2 overs)	v	Peshawar Zalmi; 146/6 (20 overs)
Kusal Perera 58 (35); Iftikhar Ahmed 4/21 (4 overs)		Babar Azam 43 (37); Saim Ayub 2/19 (4 overs)

Peshawar Zalmi won by 4 wickets
National Bank Stadium, Karachi
Umpires: Aaley Haider (Pak) and Sharfuddoula (Ban)
Player of the match: Iftikhar Ahmed (Peshawar Zalmi)

- Peshawar Zalmi won the toss and elected to field.

Match 17
9 April 2026
19:00 (N)
Scorecard

Peshawar Zalmi; 246/3 (20 overs)	v	Karachi Kings; 87 (16.1 overs)
Kusal Mendis 109 (52); Abbas Afridi 2/55 (4 overs)		Azam Khan 25 (27); Nahid Rana 3/7 (4 overs)

Peshawar Zalmi won by 159 runs
National Bank Stadium, Karachi
Umpires: Chris Gaffaney (NZ) and Rashid Riaz (Pak)
Player of the match: Kusal Mendis (Peshawar Zalmi)

- Karachi Kings won the toss and elected to field.
- Babar Azam (Peshawar Zalmi) became the fastest batter to score 12,000 runs in T20s.
- Kusal Mendis (Peshawar Zalmi) scored his maiden century in Pakistan Super League and became the first player from Sri Lanka to score a century in Pakistan Super League.
- The 191-run partnership between Kusal Mendis and Babar Azam (Peshawar Zalmi) became the highest partnership for any wicket in the Pakistan Super League.
- Peshawar Zalmi scored their highest total in Pakistan Super League.
- Karachi Kings scored their lowest total in Pakistan Super League.
- Peshawar Zalmi recorded the largest win by runs in Pakistan Super League.

Match 19
11 April 2026
14:30
Scorecard

Peshawar Zalmi; 173/7 (20 overs)	v	Lahore Qalandars; 97 (17 overs)
Kusal Mendis 74 (48); Shaheen Shah Afridi 3/22 (4 overs)		Abdullah Shafique 21 (15); Michael Bracewell 3/18 (4 overs)

Peshawar Zalmi won by 76 runs
National Bank Stadium, Karachi
Umpires: Alex Wharf (Eng) and Asif Yaqoob (Pak)
Player of the match: Kusal Mendis (Peshawar Zalmi)

- Lahore Qalandars won the toss and elected to field.
- Dunith Wellalage (Islamabad United) made his debut in PSL.
- Babar Azam (Peshawar Zalmi) scored his 4,000th run in Pakistan Super League.

Match 22
13 April 2026
19:00 (N)
Scorecard

Peshawar Zalmi; 196/6 (20 overs)	v	Multan Sultans; 172/8 (20 overs)
Kusal Mendis 68 (40); Muhammad Ismail 2/22 (3 overs)		Shan Masood 35 (19); Sufiyan Muqeem 3/30 (4 overs)

Peshawar Zalmi won by 24 runs
National Bank Stadium, Karachi
Umpires: Alex Wharf (Eng) and Rashid Riaz (Pak)
Player of the match: Sufiyan Muqeem (Peshawar Zalmi)

- Multan Sultans won the toss and elected to field.

Match 23
15 April 2026
19:00 (N)
Scorecard

Quetta Gladiators; 154 (20 overs)	v	Peshawar Zalmi; 156/2 (18.3 overs)
Hasan Nawaz 37 (35); Sufiyan Muqeem 3/25 (4 overs)		Babar Azam 71* (51); Saud Shakeel 1/23 (3 overs)

Peshawar Zalmi won by 8 wickets
National Bank Stadium, Karachi
Umpires: Chris Brown (NZ) and Rashid Riaz (Pak)
Player of the match: Sufiyan Muqeem (Peshawar Zalmi)

- Peshawar Zalmi won the toss and elected to field.
- Mohammad Basit (Peshawar Zalmi) made his debut in PSL.
- Rilee Rossouw (Quetta Gladiators) became the first overseas player to play 100 matches in the PSL.
- Babar Azam (Peshawar Zalmi) scored his 100th half-century in T20s.

Match 29
19 April 2026
19:00 (N)
Scorecard

Peshawar Zalmi; 255/3 (20 overs)	v	Quetta Gladiators; 137 (18.1 overs)
Babar Azam 100* (52); Abrar Ahmed 1/44 (4 overs)		Bevon Jacobs 34 (27); Ali Raza 3/9 (3.1 overs)

Peshawar Zalmi won by 118 runs
National Bank Stadium, Karachi
Umpires: Chris Brown (NZ) and Faisal Afridi (Pak)
Player of the match: Babar Azam (Peshawar Zalmi)

- Quetta Gladiators won the toss and elected to field.
- Peshawar Zalmi scored their highest total in Pakistan Super League, surpassing 246/3 which scored earlier in this season.

Match 32
22 April 2026
14:30
Scorecard

Karachi Kings; 182/9 (20 overs)	v	Peshawar Zalmi; 186/3 (18.5 overs)
Jason Roy 85 (51); Ali Raza 4/41 (4 overs)		Kusal Mendis 80* (43); Khushdil Shah 1/40 (4 overs)

Peshawar Zalmi won by 7 wickets
Gaddafi Stadium, Lahore
Umpires: Ahsan Raza (Pak) and Allahudien Paleker (SA)
Player of the match: Kusal Mendis (Peshawar Zalmi)

- Karachi Kings won the toss and elected to bat.
- Kusal Mendis (Peshawar Zalmi) scored his 6,000th run in T20s.
- Kusal Mendis (Peshawar Zalmi) surpassed Rilee Rossouw for the record of most runs by an overseas batsman in a single PSL edition, reaching a total of 493 runs.

Match 38
25 April 2026
19:00 (N)
Scorecard

Peshawar Zalmi; 199/4 (20 overs)	v	Lahore Qalandars; 200/4 (19.3 overs)
Michael Bracewell 83(45); Shaheen Afridi 2/36 (4 overs)		Fakhar Zaman 58* (47); Khurram Shahzad 1/22 (3 overs)

Lahore Qalandars won by 6 wickets
Gaddafi Stadium, Lahore
Umpires: Abdul Muqeet (Pak) and Allahudien Paleker (SA)
Player of the match: Fakhar Zaman (Lahore Qalandars)

- Lahore Qalandars won the toss and elected to field.
- Karachi Kings were eliminated as a result of this match.
- Lahore Qalandars broke Peshawar Zalmi's record of 8-match win streak in Pakistan Super League.

=== Playoffs ===
Qualifier
28 April 2026
19:00 (N)
Scorecard

Peshawar Zalmi; 221/7 (20 overs)	v	Islamabad United; 151 (18.4 overs)
Babar Azam 103 (59); Shadab Khan 3/42 (4 overs)		Sameer Minhas 44 (23); Aaron Hardie 3/24 (4 overs)

Peshawar Zalmi won by 70 runs
National Bank Stadium, Karachi
Umpires: Alex Wharf (Eng) and Chris Gaffaney (NZ)
Player of the match: Babar Azam (Peshawar Zalmi)

- Islamabad United won the toss and elected to field.

Final
3 May 2026
19:00 (N)
Scorecard

Hyderabad Kingsmen; 129 (18 overs)	v	Peshawar Zalmi; 130/5 (15.2 overs)
Saim Ayub 54 (50); Aaron Hardie 4/27 (4 overs)		Aaron Hardie 56* (39); Mohammad Ali 3/38 (4 overs)

Peshawar Zalmi won by 5 wickets
Gaddafi Stadium, Lahore
Umpires: Ahsan Raza (Pak) and Chris Gaffaney (NZ)
Player of the match: Aaron Hardie (Peshawar Zalmi)

- Peshawar Zalmi won the toss and elected to field.

== Statistics ==
=== Most runs ===
Player	Inns	Runs	Ave	HS	50s	100s
Babar Azam	11	588	73.50	103	3	2
Kusal Mendis	11	550	55.00	109	4	1
Mohammad Haris	9	206	22.8	47	0	0

- Source: ESPNcricinfo

=== Most wickets ===
Player	Inns	Wkts	Ave	BBI
Sufiyan Muqeem	11	22	14.40	4/32
Iftikhar Ahmed	10	12	19.75	4/21
Aaron Hardie	6	11	12.81	4/27

- Source: ESPNcricinfo
