= Cricket at the 2026 Asian Games =

- Venues: Kōrogi Sports Park
- Location: Nisshin, Aichi Prefecture, Japan
- Dates: 17 September – 3 October 2026
- Competitors: 180 from 12 nations

The Cricket tournament at the 2026 Asian Games were held between 17 September and 3 October 2026 at Kōrogi Sports Park. Both men's and women's Twenty20 International tournaments were scheduled to be played from 17 September to 3 October 2026. This is the sport's fourth appearance at the Games. India are the defending champions in both the Men's and the Women's events. In the Women's event, India defended its gold medal after defeating Sri Lanka by 147 runs, and Pakistan secured the bronze after defeating Bangladesh by 31 runs. In the Men's event, India also defended its gold medal after defeating Pakistan by 19 runs, and Sri Lanka secured the bronze after defeating Bangladesh by 63 runs.

== Background ==
=== Inclusion of cricket ===
A final decision on the inclusion of cricket was scheduled for 2025, with the Asian Cricket Council having pushed for the bid, and the then-OCA President Randhir Singh was "hopeful" for it. Its inclusion would act as the Asian qualifiers event for the 2028 Summer Olympics. On 28 April 2025, the organizing committee approved the inclusion of cricket and mixed martial arts to the programme, following a request from OCA.

=== Competition venue ===
All the matches are played at the Kōrogi Sports Park grounds for both the men's and women's team events. The venue had previously hosted the 2026 Men's T20 World Cup East Asia-Pacific Sub-regional Qualifier in earlier that year. A temporary stand was built to increase the capacity to 2,000.

Nisshin, Aichi
Kōrogi Sports Park
Capacity: 2,000

== Schedule ==
The schedule for the tournament is as follows:

P	Preliminary round	¼	Quarterfinals	½	Semifinals	F	Finals

Event↓/Date →	17 Thu	18 Fri	19 Sat	20 Sun	21 Mon	22 Tue	23 Wed	24 Thu	25 Fri	26 Sat	27 Sun	28 Mon	29 Tue	30 Wed	1 Thu	2 Fri	3 Sat
Men's team	—N/a							P	P	P	—N/a	¼	¼	—N/a	½	—N/a	F
Women's team	¼	¼	—N/a	½	—N/a	F	—N/a										

== Teams and qualification ==
Japan automatically qualified for both events as the host. The Asian teams being the ICC full members qualfiied for the tournament, while other teams qualify through a separate tournament. The men's qualifier event was held in West Coast, Singapore. The women's qualifier event were held in Kuala Lumpur, Malaysia.

Nation	Men's	Women's
Afghanistan	Yes	—N/a
Bangladesh	Yes	Yes
China	—N/a	Yes
Hong Kong	Yes	—N/a
India	Yes	Yes
Japan	Yes	Yes
Malaysia	Yes	Yes
Nepal	Yes	—N/a
Oman	Yes	—N/a
Pakistan	Yes	Yes
Sri Lanka	Yes	Yes
Thailand	—N/a	Yes
Total: 12 NOCs	10	8

=== Men's event ===
A total of ten teams competes in the men's event.

Mode of Qualification	Date	Hosts	Berths	Qualified teams
Host country	—N/a		1	Japan
ICC Full Members	—N/a		5	Afghanistan; Bangladesh; India; Pakistan; Sri Lanka
2026 Asian Games Qualifier	31 May – 8 June 2026	Singapore	4	Hong Kong; Malaysia; Nepal; Oman
Total			10	

=== Women's event ===
A total of eight teams competes in the women's event.

Mode of Qualification	Date	Host	Berths	Qualified teams
Host country	—N/a		1	Japan
ICC Full Members	—N/a		4	Bangladesh; India; Pakistan; Sri Lanka
2026 Asian Games Qualifier	26 – 31 May 2026	Malaysia	3	China; Malaysia; Thailand
Total			8	

=== Seedings ===
The seedings for the two events were decided using the ICC T20I Rankings as of 23 July 2026.

== Medal summary ==
=== Medal table ===
* Host nation (Japan)

Rank	Nation	Gold	Silver	Bronze	Total
1	India	2	0	0	2
2	Pakistan	0	1	1	2
2	Sri Lanka	0	1	1	2
Totals (3 entries)		2	2	2	6

=== Medalists ===
Event	Gold	Silver	Bronze
Men's tournament	India; Shreyas Iyer; Tilak Varma; Ravi Bishnoi; Jasprit Bumrah; Shivam Dube; Ishan Kishan; Vipraj Nigam; Axar Patel; Sanju Samson; Abhishek Sharma; Arshdeep Singh; Washington Sundar; Vaibhav Sooryavanshi; Yash Thakur	Pakistan; Sahibzada Farhan; Abdul Samad; Abrar Ahmed; Haider Ali; Saim Ayub; Ahmed Daniyal; Akif Javed; Usman Khan; Arafat Minhas; Saad Masood; Sufyan Moqim; Hasan Nawaz; Ali Raza; Maaz Sadaqat; Mohammad Wasim Jr.	Sri Lanka; Sahan Arachchige; Ashen Bandara; Lasith Croospulle; Keshan de Livera; Niroshan Dickwella; Binura Fernando; Nuwanidu Fernando; Tharindu Hansaka; Dushan Hemantha; Sineth Jayawardena; Chamika Karunaratne; Pramod Madushan; Wanuja Sahan; Nuwan Thushara; Vijayakanth Viyaskanth
Women's tournament	India; Shree Charani; Deepti Sharma; Renuka Singh Thakur; Richa Ghosh; Kamalini Gunalan; Shafali Verma; Smriti Mandhana; Arundhati Reddy; Radha Yadav; Harmanpreet Kaur; Kranti Gaud; Shreyanka Patil; Bharti Fulmali; Nandani Sharma; Pratika Rawal	Sri Lanka; Kavisha Dilhari; Hansima Karunaratne; Imesha Dulani; Kawya Kavindi; Rashmika Sewwandi; Anushka Sanjeewani; Sanjana Kavindi; Mithali Ayodhya; Kaushini Nuthyangana; Chamari Athapaththu; Hasini Perera; Chamudi Praboda; Nimasha Madushani; Harshitha Samarawickrama; Sugandika Kumari	Pakistan; Humna Bilal; Nashra Sundhu; Tasmia Rubab; Umm-e-Hani; Fatima Sana; Momina Riasat; Shawaal Zulfiqar; Aliya Riaz; Eyman Fatima; Eman Naseer; Gull Feroza; Saira Jabeen; Tuba Hassan; Ayesha Zafar
