= 2025 Pakistan T20I Tri-Nation Series =

International cricket tournament

- Date: 18–29 November 2025
- Location: Pakistan
- Result: Pakistan won the series
- Player of the series: Mohammad Nawaz (Pak)
Teams
Pakistan	Sri Lanka	Zimbabwe
Captains
Salman Ali Agha	Dasun Shanaka	Sikandar Raza
Most runs
Sahibzada Farhan (191)	Kamil Mishara (169)	Brian Bennett (141); Sikandar Raza (141)
Most wickets
Mohammad Nawaz (10)	Dushmantha Chameera (7); Wanindu Hasaranga (7)	Brad Evans (7)

The 2025 Pakistan T20I Tri-Nation Series was a cricket tournament held from 18 to 29 November 2025 in Pakistan. The participating teams were the hosts Pakistan, along with Sri Lanka and Zimbabwe, with the matches played in Twenty20 International (T20I) format. The tournament was played in a double round-robin format, with the top two teams advancing to the final. The series served as preparation for the 2026 Men's T20 World Cup.

== Background ==
Initially, Afghanistan was set to participate in the tri-series. However, the Afghanistan Cricket Board (ACB) announced on 17 October 2025 that they had withdrawn due to ongoing cross-border tensions between Pakistan and Afghanistan. Following Afghanistan's withdrawal, the Pakistan Cricket Board announced that Zimbabwe would replace Afghanistan in the tri-series, with Sri Lanka remaining the other participant. The PCB confirmed that the tournament will proceed as planned from 17 to 29 November 2025 in Pakistan.

After an attack near a court complex in Islamabad on 11 November 2025, several players of the Sri Lankan team expressed concerns about security and requested their cricket board to review participation in the ongoing tour of Pakistan. Following consultations between SLC, the Pakistan Cricket Board (PCB) and local security officials, the team decided to continue the tour under enhanced security arrangements. The start of the tri series was postponed by one day, moving from 17 to 18 November 2025, with all fixtures now scheduled to take place at the Rawalpindi Cricket Stadium.

== Squads ==
Pakistan	Sri Lanka	Zimbabwe
Salman Ali Agha (c); Shaheen Afridi; Abrar Ahmed; Faheem Ashraf; Saim Ayub; Babar Azam; Sahibzada Farhan; Usman Khan (wk); Salman Mirza; ~~Hassan Nawaz~~; Mohammad Nawaz; Abdul Samad; Naseem Shah; Usman Tariq; Mohammad Wasim Jr.; Fakhar Zaman	Dasun Shanaka (c); ~~Charith Asalanka~~ (c); Dushmantha Chameera; ~~Asitha Fernando~~; Wanindu Hasaranga; Dushan Hemantha; Janith Liyanage; Eshan Malinga; Kamindu Mendis; Kusal Mendis (wk); Kamil Mishara; Pathum Nissanka; Kusal Perera (wk); Bhanuka Rajapaksa; Pavan Rathnayake; Maheesh Theekshana; Nuwan Thushara; Vijayakanth Viyaskanth	Sikandar Raza (c); Brian Bennett; Ryan Burl; Graeme Cremer; Brad Evans; Clive Madande (wk); Tinotenda Maposa; Wellington Masakadza; Tadiwanashe Marumani (wk); Tony Munyonga; Tashinga Musekiwa; Dion Myers; Richard Ngarava; Newman Nyamhuri; Brendan Taylor

On 9 November, Hassan Nawaz was dropped from the squad, and was replaced by Fakhar Zaman.

On 17 November, Charith Asalanka and Asitha Fernando were released from the Sri Lankan squad due to illness. Dasun Shanaka was announced as the captain and Pavan Rathnayake was added into the squad. On 18 November, Vijayakanth Viyaskanth was added to the Sri Lankan squad.

== Points table ==
Pos	Team	Pld	W	L	NR	Pts	NRR	Qualification
1	Pakistan (H)	4	3	1	0	6	1.440	Advanced to the final
2	Sri Lanka	4	2	2	0	4	−0.901	Advanced to the final
3	Zimbabwe	4	1	3	0	2	−0.522	

Source: ESPNcricinfo
(H) Host

== Double Round-robin ==
18 November 2025
18:00 (N)
Scorecard

Zimbabwe; 147/8 (20 overs)	v	Pakistan; 151/5 (19.2 overs)
Brian Bennett 49 (36); Mohammad Nawaz 2/22 (4 overs)		Fakhar Zaman 44 (32); Brad Evans 2/26 (4 overs)

Pakistan won by 5 wickets
Rawalpindi Cricket Stadium, Rawalpindi
Umpires: Rashid Riaz (Pak) and Asif Yaqoob (Pak)
Player of the match: Mohammad Nawaz (Pak)

- Pakistan won the toss and elected to field.

20 November 2025
18:00 (N)
Scorecard

Zimbabwe; 162/8 (20 overs)	v	Sri Lanka; 95 (20 overs)
Brian Bennett 49 (42); Wanindu Hasaranga 3/32 (4 overs)		Dasun Shanaka 34 (25); Brad Evans 3/9 (4 overs)

Zimbabwe won by 67 runs
Rawalpindi Cricket Stadium, Rawalpindi
Umpires: Faisal Afridi (Pak) and Rashid Riaz (Pak)
Player of the match: Sikandar Raza (Zim)

- Sri Lanka won the toss and elected to field.
- Eshan Malinga (SL) made his T20I debut.
- Sikandar Raza (Zim) took his 100th wicket in T20Is.

22 November 2025
18:00 (N)
Scorecard

Sri Lanka; 128/7 (20 overs)	v	Pakistan; 131/3 (15.3 overs)
Janith Liyanage 41 (38); Mohammad Nawaz 3/16 (4 overs)		Sahibzada Farhan 80* (45); Dushmantha Chameera 2/29 (3 overs)

Pakistan won by 7 wickets
Rawalpindi Cricket Stadium, Rawalpindi
Umpires: Faisal Afridi (Pak) and Asif Yaqoob (Pak)
Player of the match: Mohammad Nawaz (Pak)

- Sri Lanka won the toss and elected to bat.
- Saim Ayub (Pak) scored his 1000th run in T20Is.
- Sahibzada Farhan became the first Pakistani player to hit 100 sixes in T20s in a single calendar year.

23 November 2025
18:00 (N)
Scorecard

Pakistan; 195/5 (20 overs)	v	Zimbabwe; 126 (19 overs)
Babar Azam 74 (52); Sikandar Raza 2/39 (4 overs)		Ryan Burl 67* (49); Usman Tariq 4/18 (4 overs)

Pakistan won by 69 runs
Rawalpindi Cricket Stadium, Rawalpindi
Umpires: Faisal Afridi (Pak) and Rashid Riaz (Pak)
Player of the match: Usman Tariq (Pak)

- Pakistan won the toss and elected to bat.
- Usman Tariq (Pak) took his first hat-trick in T20Is.

25 November 2025
18:00 (N)
Scorecard

Zimbabwe; 146/5 (20 overs)	v	Sri Lanka; 148/1 (16.2 overs)
Ryan Burl 37* (26); Maheesh Theekshana 2/23 (4 overs); Wanindu Hasaranga 2/23 (4 overs)		Pathum Nissanka 98* (58); Brad Evans 1/36 (4 overs)

Sri Lanka won by 9 wickets
Rawalpindi Cricket Stadium, Rawalpindi
Umpires: Rashid Riaz (Pak) and Asif Yaqoob (Pak)
Player of the match: Pathum Nissanka (SL)

- Zimbabwe won the toss and elected to bat.
- Pavan Rathnayake (SL) made his T20I debut.

27 November 2025
18:00 (N)
Scorecard

Sri Lanka; 184/4 (20 overs)	v	Pakistan; 178/7 (20 overs)
Kamil Mishara 76 (48); Abrar Ahmed 2/28 (4 overs)		Salman Ali Agha 63* (44); Dushmantha Chameera 4/20 (4 overs)

Sri Lanka won by 6 runs
Rawalpindi Cricket Stadium, Rawalpindi
Umpires: Faisal Afridi (Pak) and Ahsan Raza (Pak)
Player of the match: Dushmantha Chameera (SL)

- Pakistan won the toss and elected to field.

== Final ==
29 November 2025
18:00 (N)
Scorecard

Sri Lanka; 114 (19.1 overs)	v	Pakistan; 118/4 (18.4 overs)
Kamil Mishara 59 (47); Mohammad Nawaz 3/17 (4 overs)		Babar Azam 37* (34); Pavan Rathnayake 2/11 (2 overs)

Pakistan won by 6 wickets
Rawalpindi Cricket Stadium, Rawalpindi
Umpires: Ahsan Raza (Pak) and Asif Yaqoob (Pak)
Player of the match: Mohammad Nawaz (Pak)

- Pakistan won the toss and elected to field.
