= Sri Lankan cricket team in Pakistan in 2025–26 =

International cricket tour

	Pakistan	Sri Lanka
- Dates: 11 – 16 November 2025
Captains	Shaheen Afridi (Note: Salman Ali Agha captained Pakistan in the 2nd ODI.)	Charith Asalanka (Note: Kusal Mendis captained Sri Lanka in the 3rd ODI.)

One Day International series
- Results: Pakistan won the 3-match series 3–0
Most runs	Babar Azam (165); Fakhar Zaman (165)	Sadeera Samarawickrama (129)
Most wickets	Haris Rauf (9)	Wanindu Hasaranga (3); Jeffrey Vandersay (3)
- Player of the series: Haris Rauf (Pak)

The Sri Lanka cricket team toured Pakistan in November 2025 to play the Pakistan cricket team. The tour consisted of three One Day International (ODI) matches followed by a tri-nation T20I series also involving Zimbabwe. In September 2025, the Pakistan Cricket Board (PCB) confirmed the fixtures for the tour. All the matches were played at the Rawalpindi Cricket Stadium. Sri Lanka had last toured Pakistan in 2019.

The last two matches of the series were delayed after several Sri Lankan players raised concerns over security following a suicide bombing in Islamabad on 11 November 2025. The Pakistan Cricket Board (PCB) and Sri Lanka Cricket (SLC) held discussions with security officials before confirming that the tour would continue under reinforced security arrangements. Both remaining One Day Internationals (ODIs) were rescheduled and moved to the Rawalpindi Cricket Stadium.

== Squads ==
Pakistan	Sri Lanka
Shaheen Afridi (c); Salman Ali Agha; Abrar Ahmed; Faisal Akram; Faheem Ashraf; Saim Ayub; Babar Azam; Haseebullah Khan; ~~Hassan Nawaz~~; Mohammad Nawaz; Haris Rauf; Mohammad Rizwan (wk); Naseem Shah; Hussain Talat; Mohammad Wasim Jr.; Fakhar Zaman	Charith Asalanka (c); Dushmantha Chameera; Asitha Fernando; Wanindu Hasaranga; Janith Liyanage; Pramod Madushan; Eshan Malinga; Kamindu Mendis; Kusal Mendis (wk); Kamil Mishara; Pathum Nissanka; Pavan Rathnayake; Sadeera Samarawickrama (wk); Maheesh Theekshana; Lahiru Udara; Jeffrey Vandersay

On 9 November, Hassan Nawaz was dropped from the squad, and was replaced by Fakhar Zaman.

== ODI series ==
=== 1st ODI ===
11 November 2025
14:00 (D/N)
Scorecard

Pakistan; 299/5 (50 overs)	v	Sri Lanka; 293/9 (50 overs)
Salman Ali Agha 105* (87); Wanindu Hasaranga 3/54 (10 overs)		Wanindu Hasaranga 59 (52); Haris Rauf 4/61 (10 overs)

Pakistan won by 6 runs
Rawalpindi Cricket Stadium, Rawalpindi
Umpires: Alex Wharf (Eng) and Asif Yaqoob (Pak)
Player of the match: Salman Ali Agha (Pak)

- Sri Lanka won the toss and elected to field.
- Kamil Mishara (SL) made his ODI debut.

=== 2nd ODI ===
14 November 2025
14:00 (D/N)
Scorecard

Sri Lanka; 288/8 (50 overs)	v	Pakistan; 289/2 (48.2 overs)
Janith Liyanage 54 (63); Abrar Ahmed 3/41		Babar Azam 102* (119); Dushmantha Chameera 2/58

Pakistan won by 8 wickets.
Rawalpindi Cricket Stadium, Rawalpindi
Umpires: Faisal Afridi (Pak) and Sharfuddoula (Ban)
Player of the match: Babar Azam (Pak)

- Pakistan won the toss and elected to field.
- Kusal Mendis (SL) played in his 150th ODI match.
- Babar Azam (Pak) Scored his 20th century equaling the record of Saeed Anwar for most ODI centuries for Pakistan.

=== 3rd ODI ===
16 November 2025
14:00 (D/N)
Scorecard

Sri Lanka; 211 (45.2 overs)	v	Pakistan; 215/4 (44.4 overs)
Sadeera Samarawickrama 48 (65); Mohammad Wasim Jr. 3/47 (10 overs)		Mohammad Rizwan 61* (92); Jeffrey Vandersay 3/42 (10 overs)

Pakistan won by 6 wickets
Rawalpindi Cricket Stadium, Rawalpindi
Umpires: Rashid Riaz (Pak) and Alex Wharf (Eng)
Player of the match: Mohammad Wasim Jr. (Pak)

- Pakistan won the toss and elected to field.
- Pavan Rathnayake (SL) made his ODI debut.
- Mohammad Rizwan (Pak) played in his 100th ODI match.
