= 2026 Hyderabad Kingsmen season =

Overview of Hyderabad Kingsmen in 2026

Hyderabad Kingsmen
2026 season
- Coach: Jason Gillespie
- Captain: Marnus Labuschagne
- Final: Runners-up

Hyderabad Kingsmen is a professional Twenty20 franchise cricket team that competed in 2026 Pakistan Super League. Team is based in the Hyderabad city of Pakistan. This was the debut season of the Kingsmen alongside Rawalpindiz.

Kingsmen came into existence after Pakistan Cricket Board successfully conducted an auction for 2 new teams to expand the league from 6 to 8 teams. They were coached by Jason Gillespie in 2026 season and Marnus Labuschagne was the captain of the team.

== Squad ==
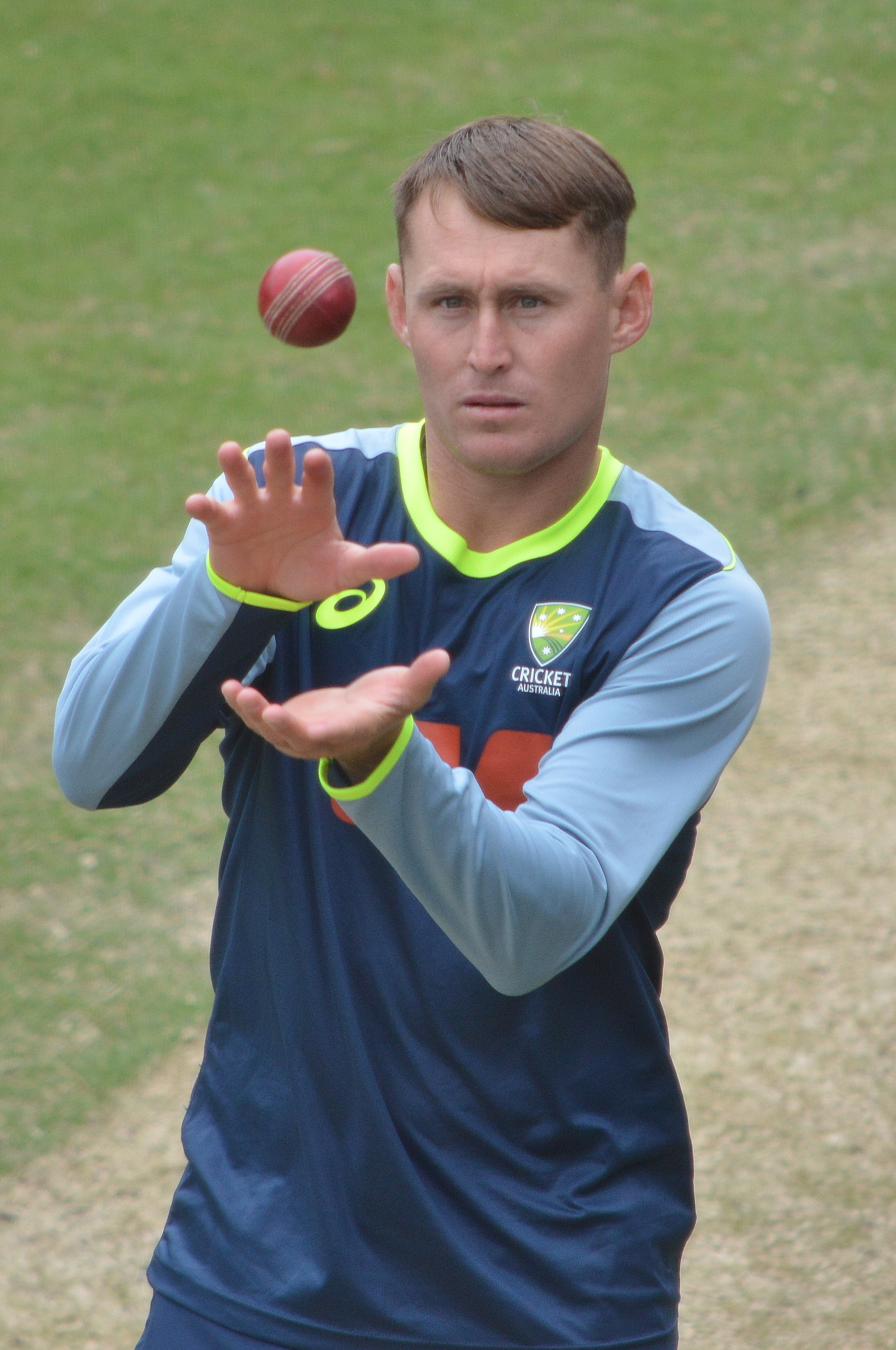
Marnus Labuschagne captain of Hyderabad Kingsmen in 2026.

Pakistan Super League introduced auction model for the first time in 2026 season, allowing teams to select players by bidding in Pakistani rupees. Teams were also allowed to directly sign one foreign player who was not part of previous season. Hyderabad chose Marnus Labuschagne as their directly signed player. Teams were also allowed to retain upto 4 players who were part of their squads in previous season while new teams were allowed to sign 4 players before auction to match with other franchises. Hyderabad selected Saim Ayub, Usman Khan, Maaz Sadaqat and Akif Javed as their retentions.

Player auction for the PSL 11 was held on 11 February 2026. Following is the full squad of Hyderabad Kingsmen after player auction and Retentions.

Key
- Players with international caps are listed in **bold**.
- * denotes a player who is fully unavailable.
- * denotes a player who will be partially unavailable.

No.	Name	Nationality	Birth date	Salary	Batting style	Bowling style	Year signed	Notes
Batsmen
33	**Marnus Labuschagne**	Australia	22 June 1994 (age 32)	PKR 5.88 crore	Right-handed	Right-arm leg break	2026	
80	**Irfan Khan Niazi**	Pakistan	28 December 2002 (age 23)	PKR 2.90 crore	Right-handed	Right-arm medium	2026	
11	**Shayan Jahangir**	United States	24 December 1994 (age 31)	PKR 60 lakh	Right-handed	Right-arm medium	2026	
98	**Sharjeel Khan**	Pakistan	14 August 1989 (age 37)	PKR 60 lakh	Left-handed	Slow left arm orthodox	2026	
—	**Saad Ali**	Pakistan	5 October 1993 (age 33)	PKR 60 lakh	Right-handed	Right-arm medium	2026	
1	Tayyab Arif	Pakistan	11 October 2006 (age 20)	PKR 60 lakh	Right-handed	—	2026	
Wicket-keepers
55	**Kusal Perera**	Sri Lanka	17 August 1990 (age 36)	PKR 3.10 crore	Left-handed	—	2026	
78	**Usman Khan**	Pakistan	10 May 1995 (age 31)	PKR 4.62 crore	Right-handed	—	2026	
All-rounders
63	**Saim Ayub**	Pakistan	24 May 2002 (age 24)	PKR 12.60 crore	Left-handed	Right-arm off break	2026	
32	Glenn Maxwell	Australia	14 October 1988 (age 38)	PKR 4.50 crore	Right-handed	Right-arm off break	2026	
16	Maaz Sadaqat	Pakistan	15 May 2005 (age 21)	PKR 3.50 crore	Left-handed	Slow left arm orthodox	2026	
98	Hassan Khan	United States	16 October 1998 (age 28)	PKR 1.85 crore	Right-handed	Slow left arm orthodox	2026	
73	**Hammad Azam**	United States	16 March 1991 (age 35)	PKR 60 lakh	Right-handed	Right-arm fast-medium	2026	
—	Rizwan Mehmood	Pakistan	15 June 2004 (age 22)	PKR 60 lakh	Right-handed	Right-arm leg break	2026	
55	Ahmed Hussain	Pakistan	15 May 2007 (age 19)	PKR 60 lakh	Left-handed	Left-arm leg break	2026	
Bowlers
88	**Akif Javed**	Pakistan	10 October 2000 (age 26)	PKR 1.96 crore	Right-handed	Left-arm fast	2026	
11	**Mohammad Ali**	Pakistan	1 November 1992 (age 34)	PKR 2.15 crore	Right-handed	Right-arm medium-fast	2026	
34	**Riley Meredith**	Australia	21 June 1996 (age 30)	PKR 4.20 crore	Right-handed	Right-arm fast	2026	
41	**Ottniel Baartman**	South Africa	18 March 1993 (age 33)	PKR 1.10 crore	Right-handed	Right-arm fast-medium	2026	
73	Hunain Shah	Pakistan	4 February 2004 (age 22)	PKR 60 lakh	Right-handed	Right-arm medium	2026	
84	Asif Mehmood	Pakistan	3 February 1996 (age 30)	PKR 60 lakh	Right-handed	Right-arm medium	2026	

Source: ESPNcricinfo

== Coaching and management staff ==
The franchise appointed former Pakistan Test coach and former Australian pacer Jason Gillespie as their head coach.

- Head Coach: Jason Gillespie
- Fielding Coach: Grant Bradburn
- Batting Coach: Hanif Malik
- Assistant Coach: Craig White

== Team standings ==
Pos	Team	Pld	W	L	NR	Pts	NRR	Qualification
1	Peshawar Zalmi (C)	10	8	1	1	17	2.324	Advanced to the Qualifier
2	Islamabad United (3rd)	10	6	3	1	13	1.667	Advanced to the Qualifier
3	Multan Sultans (4th)	10	6	4	0	12	0.326	Advanced to the Eliminator 1
4	Hyderabad Kingsmen (R)	10	5	5	0	10	−0.361	Advanced to the Eliminator 1
5	Lahore Qalandars	10	5	5	0	10	−0.482	Eliminated
6	Karachi Kings	10	5	5	0	10	−0.869	Eliminated
7	Quetta Gladiators	10	3	7	0	6	−0.410	Eliminated
8	Rawalpindiz	10	1	9	0	2	−1.760	Eliminated

Source: ESPNcricinfo

Notes

- C = Champions;
- R = Runners-up;
- (x) = Position at the end of the tournament;

== Fixtures ==
Match 1
26 March 2026
19:00 (N)
Scorecard

Lahore Qalandars; 199/6 (20 overs)	v	Hyderabad Kingsmen; 130 (20 overs)
Fakhar Zaman 53 (39); Hassan Khan 2/30 (4 overs)		Marnus Labuschagne 26 (22); Haris Rauf 2/22 (4 overs)

Lahore Qalandars won by 69 runs
Gaddafi Stadium, Lahore
Umpires: Ahsan Raza (Pak) and Alex Wharf (Eng)
Player of the match: Fakhar Zaman (Lahore Qalandars)

- Lahore Qalandars won the toss and elected to bat.

Match 5
29 March 2026
14:30
Scorecard

Quetta Gladiators; 174/8 (20 overs)	v	Hyderabad Kingsmen; 134/8 (20 overs)
Shamyl Hussain 54 (41); Riley Meredith 3/38 (4 overs)		Irfan Khan Niazi 33 (25); Abrar Ahmed 3/23 (4 overs)

Quetta Gladiators won by 40 runs.
Gaddafi Stadium, Lahore
Umpires: Ahsan Raza (Pak) and Alex Wharf (Eng)
Player of the match: Shamyl Hussain (Quetta Gladiators)

- Quetta Gladiators won the toss and elected to bat.

Match 8
1 April 2026
19:00 (N)
Scorecard

Hyderabad Kingsmen; 225/5 (20 overs)	v	Multan Sultans; 227/4 (18.4 overs)
Maaz Sadaqat 62 (26); Mohammad Wasim Jr. 2/37 (4 overs)		Sahibzada Farhan 106* (57); Saim Ayub 2/43 (3 overs)

Multan Sultans won by 6 wickets
Gaddafi Stadium, Lahore
Umpires: Asif Yaqoob (Pak) and Chris Gaffaney (NZ)
Player of the match: Sahibzada Farhan (Multan Sultans)

- Hyderabad Kingsmen won the toss and elected to bat.

Match 15
8 April 2026
19:00 (N)
Scorecard

Hyderabad Kingsmen; 145 (18.2 overs)	v	Peshawar Zalmi; 146/6 (20 overs)
Kusal Perera 58 (35); Iftikhar Ahmed 4/21 (4 overs)		Babar Azam 43 (37); Saim Ayub 2/19 (4 overs)

Peshawar Zalmi won by 4 wickets
National Bank Stadium, Karachi
Umpires: Aaley Haider (Pak) and Sharfuddoula (Ban)
Player of the match: Iftikhar Ahmed (Peshawar Zalmi)

- Peshawar Zalmi won the toss and elected to field.

Match 20
11 April 2026
19:00 (N)
Scorecard

Karachi Kings; 188/8 (20 overs)	v	Hyderabad Kingsmen; 189/6 (19.1 overs)
Saad Baig 53 (37); Hunain Shah 3/19 (4 overs)		Maaz Sadaqat 37 (29); Abbas Afridi 2/30 (4 overs)

Hyderabad Kingsmen won by 4 wickets
National Bank Stadium, Karachi
Umpires: Sharfuddoula (Ban) and Zulfiqar Jan (Pak)
Player of the match: Hassan Khan (Hyderabad Kingsmen)

- Hyderabad Kingsmen won the toss and elected to field.
- Hyderabad Kingsmen recorded their first win in Pakistan Super League.

Match 21
12 April 2026
19:00 (N)
Scorecard

Islamabad United; 153/9 (20 overs)	v	Hyderabad Kingsmen; 157/4 (18.1 overs)
Devon Conway 45 (31); Asif Mehmood 4/18 (2 overs)		Marnus Labuschagne 61* (53); Chris Green 2/19 (4 overs)

Hyderabad Kingsmen won by 6 wickets
National Bank Stadium, Karachi
Umpires: Chris Gaffaney (NZ) and Nasir Hussain (Pak)
Player of the match: Marnus Labuschagne (Hyderabad Kingsmen)

- Hyderabad Kingsmen won the toss and elected to field.

Match 24
16 April 2026
14:30
Scorecard

Rawalpindiz; 121/9 (20 overs)	v	Hyderabad Kingsmen; 123/5 (16.3 overs)
Sam Billings 26 (22); Hunain Shah 3/18 (4 overs)		Irfan Khan Niazi 34* (29); Asif Afridi 2/20 (4 overs)

Hyderabad Kingsmen won by 5 wickets
National Bank Stadium, Karachi
Umpires: Chris Brown (NZ) and Tariq Rasheed (Pak)
Player of the match: Hunain Shah (Hyderabad Kingsmen)

- Hyderabad Kingsmen won the toss and elected to field.
- Glenn Maxwell (Hyderabad Kingsmen) took his 200th wicket in T20s.

Match 33
22 April 2026
19:00 (N)
Scorecard

Multan Sultans; 213/7 (20 overs)	v	Hyderabad Kingsmen; 214/6 (19.3 overs)
Steve Smith 106 (50); Akif Javed 3/30 (4 overs)		Usman Khan 101 (47); Peter Siddle 3/39 (4 overs)

Hyderabad Kingsmen won by 4 wickets
National Bank Stadium, Karachi
Umpires: Chris Gaffaney (NZ) and Zulfiqar Jan (Pak)
Player of the match: Usman Khan (Hyderabad Kingsmen)

- Hyderabad Kingsmen won the toss and elected to field.
- Steve Smith (Multan Sultans) scored his maiden century in Pakistan Super League.
- Usman Khan (Hyderabad Kingsmen) scored his fourth century in Pakistan Super League, the most by any batter.

Match 36
24 April 2026
19:00 (N)
Scorecard

Hyderabad Kingsmen; 80 (15.5 overs)	v	Islamabad United; 83/2 (6.4 overs)
Usman Khan 25* (35); Richard Gleeson 3/9 (3 overs)		Mohsin Riaz 42 (18); Mohammad Ali 2/29 (3.4 overs)

Islamabad United won by 8 wickets
National Bank Stadium, Karachi
Umpires: Chris Gaffaney (NZ) and Rashid Riaz (Pak)
Player of the match: Richard Gleeson (Islamabad United)

- Islamabad United won the toss and elected to field.
- Islamabad United and Multan Sultan qualified for the play-offs as a result of this match.

Match 39
26 April 2026
14:30
Scorecard

Hyderabad Kingsmen; 244/5 (20 overs)	v	Rawalpindiz; 136 (17.1 overs)
Glenn Maxwell 70 (37); Saad Masood 2/34 (4 overs)		Usman Khawaja 66* (43); Hunain Shah 4/22 (3.1 overs)

Hyderabad Kingsmen won by 108 runs
National Bank Stadium, Karachi
Umpires: Alex Wharf (Eng) and Zulfiqar Jan (Pak)
Player of the match: Glenn Maxwell (Hyderabad Kingsmen)

- Rawalpindiz won the toss and elected to field.
- Hyderabad Kingsmen qualified for the play-offs while Lahore Qalandars were eliminated as a result of this match.

Eliminator 1
29 April 2026
19:00 (N)
Scorecard

Multan Sultans; 159/9 (20 overs)	v	Hyderabad Kingsmen; 162/2 (15.2 overs)
Shan Masood 69* (46); Akif Javed 2/30 (4 overs)		Maaz Sadaqat 64* (33); Steve Smith 1/14 (1 over)

Hyderabad Kingsmen won by 8 wickets
Gaddafi Stadium, Lahore
Umpires: Asif Yaqoob (Pak) and Sharfuddoula (Ban)
Player of the match: Maaz Sadaqat (Hyderabad Kingsmen)

- Hyderabad Kingsmen won the toss and elected to field.

Eliminator 2
01 May 2026
19:00 (N)
Scorecard

Hyderabad Kingsmen; 186/5 (20 overs)	v	Islamabad United; 184/7 (20 overs)
Usman Khan 61* (30); Imad Wasim 2/16 (2 overs)		Mark Chapman 43 (26); Hunain Shah 2/37 (4 overs)

Hyderabad Kingsmen won by 2 runs
Gaddafi Stadium, Lahore
Umpires: Ahsan Raza (Pak) and Sharfuddoula (Ban)
Player of the match: Hunain Shah (Hyderabad Kingsmen)

- Islamabad United won the toss and elected to field.

Final
3 May 2026
19:00 (N)
Scorecard

Hyderabad Kingsmen; 129 (18 overs)	v	Peshawar Zalmi; 130/5 (15.2 overs)
Saim Ayub 54 (50); Aaron Hardie 4/27 (4 overs)		Aaron Hardie 56* (39); Mohammad Ali 3/38 (4 overs)

Peshawar Zalmi won by 5 wickets
Gaddafi Stadium, Lahore
Umpires: Ahsan Raza (Pak) and Chris Gaffaney (NZ)
Player of the match: Aaron Hardie (Peshawar Zalmi)

- Peshawar Zalmi won the toss and elected to field.
