= Pakistani cricket team in Bangladesh in 2025 =

International cricket tour

	Bangladesh	Pakistan
- Dates: 20 – 24 July 2025
Captains	Litton Das	Salman Ali Agha

Twenty20 International series
- Results: Bangladesh won the 3-match series 2–1
Most runs	Jaker Ali (71)	Sahibzada Farhan (63)
Most wickets	Taskin Ahmed (6)	Salman Mirza (7)
- Player of the series: Jaker Ali (Ban)

The Pakistan cricket team toured Bangladesh in July 2025 to play against the Bangladesh cricket team. The tour consisted of three Twenty20 International (T20I) matches. The series served as preparation for both teams ahead of the 2025 Asia Cup and the 2026 Men's T20 World Cup. The matches were played at the Sher-e-Bangla National Cricket Stadium in Dhaka. In March 2025, the Bangladesh Cricket Board (BCB) announced the schedule of the series.

Originally, the tour was scheduled as a three ODIs under the Future Tours Programme (FTP). However, with the ICC Men's T20 World Cup scheduled in 2026, both the boards mutually agreed with a three-match T20I series.

Bangladesh won the series by 2-1 margin, achieving their first T20I series win over Pakistan.

== Squads ==
Bangladesh	Pakistan
Litton Das (c, wk); Nasum Ahmed; Taskin Ahmed; Jaker Ali (wk); Parvez Hossain Emon; Mahedi Hasan; Tanzid Hasan; Rishad Hossain; Shamim Hossain; Towhid Hridoy; Shoriful Islam; Mehidy Hasan Miraz; Mohammad Naim; Mustafizur Rahman; Mohammad Saifuddin; Tanzim Hasan Sakib	Salman Ali Agha (c); Abbas Afridi; Abrar Ahmed; Faheem Ashraf; Saim Ayub; Ahmed Daniyal; Sahibzada Farhan (wk); Mohammad Haris (wk); Salman Mirza; Sufiyan Muqeem; Hassan Nawaz; Mohammad Nawaz; Khushdil Shah; Hussain Talat; Fakhar Zaman

== T20I series ==
=== 1st T20I ===
20 July 2025
18:00 (N)
Scorecard

Pakistan; 110 (19.3 overs)	v	Bangladesh; 112/3 (15.3 overs)
Fakhar Zaman 44 (34); Taskin Ahmed 3/22 (3.3 overs)		Parvez Hossain Emon 56* (39); Salman Mirza 2/23 (3.3 overs)

Bangladesh won by 7 wickets
Sher-e-Bangla National Cricket Stadium, Dhaka
Umpires: Morshed Ali Khan (Ban) and Gazi Sohel (Ban)
Player of the match: Parvez Hossain Emon (Ban)

- Bangladesh won the toss and elected to field.
- Salman Mirza (Pak) made his T20I debut.
- Mustafizur Rahman (Ban) bowled the most economical spell in T20Is for Bangladesh (2/6 of 4 overs, economy rate of 1.5).
- This was the first time Bangladesh bowled out Pakistan in T20Is.

=== 2nd T20I ===
22 July 2025
18:00 (N)
Scorecard

Bangladesh; 133 (20 overs)	v	Pakistan; 125 (19.2 overs)
Jaker Ali 55 (48); Salman Mirza 2/17 (4 overs)		Faheem Ashraf 51 (32); Shoriful Islam 3/17 (4 overs)

Bangladesh won by 8 runs
Sher-e-Bangla National Cricket Stadium, Dhaka
Umpires: Tanvir Ahmed (Ban) and Masudur Rahman (Ban)
Player of the match: Jaker Ali (Ban)

- Pakistan won the toss and elected to field.
- Ahmed Daniyal (Pak) made his T20I debut.

=== 3rd T20I ===
24 July 2025
18:00 (N)
Scorecard

Pakistan; 178/7 (20 overs)	v	Bangladesh; 104 (16.4 overs)
Sahibzada Farhan 63 (41); Taskin Ahmed 3/38 (4 overs)		Mohammad Saifuddin 35* (34); Salman Mirza 3/19 (4 overs)

Pakistan won by 74 runs
Sher-e-Bangla National Cricket Stadium, Dhaka
Umpires: Masudur Rahman (Ban) and Gazi Sohel (Ban)
Player of the match: Sahibzada Farhan (Pak)

- Bangladesh won the toss and elected to field.
