= 2026 Asian Games Men's Qualifier =

2026 Asian Games Men's Qualifier may refer to:

- Cricket at the 2026 Asian Games – Men's Qualifier
- Field hockey at the 2026 Asian Games – Men's Qualifier
