= Ahmed Daniyal =

Pakistani cricketer (born 1997)

Personal information
- Born: 3 July 1997 (age 29); Lahore, Punjab, Pakistan
- Batting: Right-handed
- Bowling: Right-arm medium-fast
- Role: Bowler

International information
- National side: Pakistan
- T20I debut (cap 123): 22 July 2025 v Bangladesh
- Last T20I: 24 July 2025 v Bangladesh

Domestic team information
- Years: Team
- 2021: Lahore Qalandars
- 2022: Melbourne Stars (squad no. 3)
- 2022: Central Punjab cricket team
- 2023–present: Lahore Whites (squad no. 93)
- 2025: Peshawar Zalmi
- 2026: Quetta Gladiators

Career statistics
Competition	FC	T20
Matches	3	20
Runs scored	1	20
Batting average	1.00	5.00
100s/50s	0/0	0/0
Top score	1	6*
Balls bowled	414	426
Wickets	10	19
Bowling average	24.10	34.63
5 wickets in innings	0	0
10 wickets in match	0	0
Best bowling	3/33	4/28
Catches/stumpings	1/–	1/–
Medal record
Representing Pakistan
Asian Games
Silver medal – second place	2026 Aichi–Nagoya	Team
- Source: Cricinfo, 8 September 2022

Ahmed Daniyal (born 3 July 1997) is a Pakistani cricketer.

== Domestic and franchise career ==
He made his Twenty20 debut on 21 February 2021, for Lahore Qalandars in the 2021 Pakistan Super League.

He was part of the Lahore Qalandars' Players Development Program.

== International career ==
On 22 July 2025, in his Twenty20 International (T20I) debut during the second T20I of the away tour in Bangladesh, Daniyal made an immediate impact by bowling four overs for 23 runs and claiming two wickets. Most notably, he clocked a velocity of 146 km/h in his first over, prompting comparisons with Pakistan’s legendary speedster Shoaib Akhtar.

In November 2025, in the final of the Asia Cup Rising Stars between Pakistan Shaheens and Bangladesh A, Daniyal delivered a standout bowling performance. With precise and disciplined seam bowling, he claimed a match-winning haul (figures of 2/11 with an economy rate of 2.75) that stifled Bangladesh A’s chase and turned the momentum decisively in Pakistan’s favour. He later bowled the Super Over, conceding only 6 runs (including 5 wides) and taking both wickets, thus setting a low target of 7 for the Shaheens. For his contribution he was declared Player of the Match.

In June 2026, he was named in the 15-member men's squad announced for the 2026 Asian Games. On 3 October 2026, Pakistan won the silver medal after losing in the Asian Games men’s cricket final against India at the Kōrogi Athletic Park in Nisshin, Japan.
