= Cricket at the 2026 Asian Games – Women's tournament =

Cricket tournament

Women's cricket at the 2026 Asian Games
- Venue: Kōrogi Sports Park
- Location: Nisshin, Japan
- Dates: 17 – 22 September
- Nations: 8

Medalists
gold medal	India
silver medal	Sri Lanka
bronze medal	Pakistan

The Women's cricket event was a part of the 2026 Asian Games from 17 to 22 September 2026 at the Kōrogi Sports Park in Aichi Prefecture, Japan. A total of 8 teams had participated with the matches played in Twenty-20 format.

The Quarter final match between Bangladesh and China was abandoned without the toss due to rain and Bangladesh entered the semi final, being the higher ranked side.

India defended its gold medal after defeating Sri Lanka by 147 runs, and Pakistan secured the bronze after defeating Bangladesh by 31 runs.

== Participating nations ==
On 28 April 2025, the organizing committee approved the inclusion of cricket to the programme, following a request from OCA. The tournament features 8 nations.

Mode of Qualification	Date	Host	Berths	Qualified teams
Host country	—N/a		1	Japan
ICC Full Members	—N/a		4	Bangladesh; India; Pakistan; Sri Lanka
2026 Asian Games Qualifier	26 – 31 May 2026	(Malaysia) Pandamaran	3	China; Malaysia; Thailand
Total			8	

=== Draw ===
The seeds were determined based on the ICC Women's T20I Team Rankings as of 23 July 2026, followed by an official draw on the same day to allocate the knockout stage bracket.

== Format ==
Unlike the men's tournament, the women's tournament will not feature a league stage and will be played as a direct knockout competition. The tournament consists of four quarter-finals, followed by two semi-finals. The winners of both semi-finals advance to the gold medal match, while the losers compete in the bronze medal match.

== Squads ==
Bangladesh	China	India	Japan
Nigar Sultana (c, wk); Nahida Akter (vc); Sharmin Akhter; Dilara Akter (wk); Marufa Akter; Shorna Akter; Juairiya Ferdous (wk); Rabeya Khan; Fahima Khatun; Sultana Khatun; Sanjida Akter Meghla; Ritu Moni; Sobhana Mostary; Sharmin Sultana; Fariha Trisna	Mingyue Zhu (c); Cai Yuzhi; Chen Xinyu; Feng Qian; Gong Yuting; Hong Yali; Jiang Chuquin (wk); Jiaping Li; Lyu Yihan; Ma Ruike; Wang Huiying; Wei Haiting; Wen Sinan; Xie Wenyan; Zhao Yihan	Harmanpreet Kaur (c); Smriti Mandhana (vc); Shree Charani; Bharti Fulmali; Kranti Gaud; Richa Ghosh (wk); Gunalan Kamalini (wk); Shreyanka Patil; Pratika Rawal (Note: Jemimah Rodrigues was replaced by Pratika Rawal in India's squad due to a hamstring injury.); Arundhati Reddy; ~~Jemimah Rodrigues~~; Deepti Sharma; Nandani Sharma; Renuka Singh Thakur; Shafali Verma; Radha Yadav	Mai Yanagida (c); Erika Oda (vc); Ahilya Chandel; Ayumi Fujikawa; Hinase Goto (wk); Haruna Iwasaki; Shimako Kato; Ayaka Kato-Stafford; Elena Kusuda-Nairn; Akari Nishimura (wk); Meg Ogawa; Kurumi Ota; Seika Sumi; Erika Toguchi-Quinn; Nonoha Yasumoto
Malaysia	Pakistan	Sri Lanka	Thailand
Mas Elysa (c); Nur Arianna Natsya (vc); Aina Najwa (wk); Winifred Duraisingam; Wan Julia (wk); Ainna Hamizah Hashim; Mahirah Izzati Ismail; Aisya Eleesa; Nur Dania Syuhada; Amalin Sorfina; Dhanusri Muhunan; Musfirah Nur Ainaa; Nazatul Hidayah Husna; Nur Qalysha; Nurin Imanina	Fatima Sana (c); Muneeba Ali (wk); Humna Bilal; Eyman Fatima; Gull Feroza; Umm-e-Hani; Tuba Hassan; Saira Jabeen; Eman Naseer; Momina Riasat; Aliya Riaz; Tasmia Rubab; Nashra Sandhu; Ayesha Zafar; Shawaal Zulfiqar	Chamari Athapaththu (c); Mithali Ayodhya; Nilakshi de Silva; Kavisha Dilhari; Imesha Dulani; Vishmi Gunaratne; Kawya Kavindi; Sanjana Kavindi; Sugandika Kumari; Nimasha Madushani; Kaushini Nuthyangana (wk); Hasini Perera; Chamudi Praboda; Harshitha Samarawickrama; Rashmika Sewwandi	Naruemol Chaiwai (c, wk); Thanrada Seesawan; Chanida Sutthiruang; Nannaphat Chaihan; Natthakan Chantham; Phannita Maya; Aphisara Suwanchonrathi; Sunida Chaturongrattana; Onnicha Kamchomphu; Suleeporn Laomi; Thipatcha Putthawong; Nannapat Koncharoenkai; Koranit Suwanchonrathi; Pattamawadee Suriya; Chayanisa Phengpaen

== Knockout stage ==
The fixtures of the tournament were announced on 26 August 2026 to determine the knockout stage fixtures.

=== Bracket ===
Quarter-finals
17 September – Nisshin
Bangladesh	Abandoned
China	Abandoned
18 September – Nisshin
Japan	57 (19.5)
India	59/2 (5)
17 September – Nisshin
Pakistan	92/7 (10.4)
Thailand	91/4 (11)
18 September – Nisshin
Malaysia	74/7 (20)
Sri Lanka	160/4 (20)

Semi-finals
20 September – Nisshin
Bangladesh	81 (15.4)
India	195/4 (20)
20 September – Nisshin
Pakistan	177/4 (20 overs)
Sri Lanka	178/2 (17.5)

Gold medal match
22 September – Nisshin
India (gold)	216/3 (20)
Sri Lanka (silver)	69 (15.4)
Bronze medal match
22 September – Nisshin
Bangladesh	114/7 (20)
Pakistan (bronze)	145/8 (20)

=== Quarter-finals ===
Quarter-final 1
17 September 2026
07:00
Scorecard

Bangladesh	v	China

Match abandoned
Kōrogi Sports Park, Nisshin
Umpires: Saleema Imtiaz (Pak) and Gayathri Venugopalan (Ind)

- No toss.
- No play was possible due to wet outfield.
- Bangladesh advanced by virtue of being the higher-seeded team.

Quarter-final 2
17 September 2026
14:00
Scorecard

Thailand; 91/4 (11 overs)	v	Pakistan; 92/7 (10.4 overs)
Nannapat Koncharoenkai 49 (38); Fatima Sana 2/22 (3 overs)		Shawaal Zulfiqar 25 (14); Onnicha Kamchomphu 3/37 (3 overs)

Pakistan won by 3 wickets
Kōrogi Sports Park, Nisshin
Umpires: Shivani Mishra (Qat) and Nimali Perera (SL)

- Pakistan won the toss and elected to field.
- The match was reduced to 11 overs per side due to rain.

Quarter-final 3
18 September 2026
09:00
Scorecard

Sri Lanka; 160/4 (20 overs)	v	Malaysia; 74/7 (20 overs)
Chamari Athapaththu 63 (37); Nurin Imanina 3/29 (4 overs)		Winifred Duraisingam 28 (47); Chamari Athapaththu 2/3 (2 overs)

Sri Lanka won by 86 runs
Kōrogi Sports Park, Nisshin
Umpires: Gayathri Venugopalan (Ind) and Saleema Imtiaz (Pak)

- Sri Lanka won the toss and elected to bat.

Quarter-final 4
18 September 2026
14:00
Scorecard

Japan; 57 (19.5 overs)	v	India; 59/2 (5 overs)
Ayaka Kato-Stafford 25 (47); Shree Charani 4/10 (4 overs)		Shafali Verma 40* (15); Nonoha Yasumoto 1/8 (2 overs)

India won by 8 Wickets
Kōrogi Sports Park, Nisshin
Umpires: Shathira Jakir (Ban) and Shivani Mishra (Qat)

- India won the toss and elected to field.
- This was the first time India and Japan faced each other in WT20Is.

=== Semi-finals ===
Semi-final 1
20 September 2026
09:00
Scorecard

Pakistan; 177/4 (20 overs)	v	Sri Lanka; 178/2 (17.5 overs)
Ayesha Zafar 71 (40); Kawya Kavindi 1/13 (2 overs)		Chamari Athapaththu 83* (50); Fatima Sana 1/24 (3 overs)

Sri Lanka won by 8 wickets
Kōrogi Sports Park, Nisshin
Umpires: Shathira Jakir (Ban) and Shivani Mishra (Qat)

- Sri Lanka won the toss and elected to field.
- This was the highest successful run chase for Sri Lanka in WT20Is.

Semi-final 2
20 September 2026
14:00
Scorecard

India; 195/4 (20 overs)	v	Bangladesh; 81 (15.4 overs)
Shafali Verma 100* (49); Sanjida Akter Meghla 1/25 (4 overs)		Dilara Akter 27 (23); Deepti Sharma 3/7 (2.4 overs)

India won by 114 runs
Kōrogi Sports Park, Nisshin
Umpires: Shivani Mishra (Qat) and Nimali Perera (SL)

- India won the toss and elected to bat.
- Shafali Verma (Ind) scored her maiden century in T20Is.
- Smriti Mandhana (Ind) became the leading run-scorer in women's T20Is (4788 runs), surpassing Suzie Bates' 4758 runs.

=== Bronze medal match ===
22 September 2026
09:00
Scorecard

Pakistan; 145/8 (20 overs)	v	Bangladesh; 114/7 (20 overs)
Fatima Sana 45 (30); Shorna Akter 2/16 (3 overs)		Sharmin Akhter 46 (45); Umm-e-Hani 3/10 (4 overs)

Pakistan won by 31 runs
Kōrogi Sports Park, Nisshin
Umpires: Nimali Perera (SL) and Gayathri Venugopalan (Ind)

- Pakistan won the toss and elected to bat.

=== Gold medal match ===
22 September 2026
14:00
Scorecard

India; 216/3 (20 overs)	v	Sri Lanka; 69 (15.4 overs)
Smriti Mandhana 79 (45); Chamudi Praboda 1/34 (4 overs)		Chamari Athapaththu 29 (21); Deepti Sharma 3/6 (4 overs)

India won by 147 runs
Kōrogi Sports Park, Nisshin
Umpires: Saleema Imtiaz (Pak) and Shathira Jakir (Ban)

- India won the toss and elected to bat.
- India won the gold medal.

== Final standing ==
Rank	Team	Pld	W	L	T	NR
1st place, gold medalist(s)	India	3	3	0	0	0
2nd place, silver medalist(s)	Sri Lanka	3	2	1	0	0
3rd place, bronze medalist(s)	Pakistan	3	2	1	0	0
4	Bangladesh	3	0	2	0	1
5	China	1	0	0	0	1
6	Thailand	1	0	1	0	0
7	Japan	1	0	1	0	0
8	Malaysia	1	0	1	0	0

== See also ==
- 2026 Asian Games – Men's Qualifier
- 2026 Asian Games – Men's tournament
- 2026 Asian Games – Women's Qualifier
- Cricket at the 2026 Asian Games
- 2026 Asian Games
