= Lahore Qalandars Players Development Program =

Sport Development Program

The Lahore Qalandars Players Development Program is a player development program of Lahore Qalandars that conducts cricket players' trials throughout Punjab.

== History ==
Established in 2016 by the Lahore Qalandars, the Lahore Qalandars Players Development Program identifies and develops emerging cricketers not previously integrated into Pakistan's domestic cricket system. Through this program, representatives visit various cities, conduct trials, and curate city-specific squads. These squads participate in a tournament overseen by the Qalandars, with top performers progressing to further training at the Qalandars High-Performance Center (QHPC) in Lahore. The program has expanded to include both male and female cricketers.

In the early stages of the program, selected squads played matches in Australia against Big Bash League teams, including the Sydney Sixers, Sydney Thunder, and Hobart Hurricanes. Players such as Haris Rauf, Usman Qadir, Salman Irshad, and Ghulam Rabbani subsequently received contracts with clubs in Australia, with Rauf later participating in the Big Bash and representing Pakistan.

== Affiliations ==
The Lahore Qalandars have also established affiliations with the Marylebone Cricket Club (MCC) and Yorkshire Cricket Club. Annually, two standout participants of the program receive training at the MCC. A player exchange agreement is also in place with Yorkshire. Matches between Qalandars and Yorkshire are scheduled yearly.

== Qalandars High-Performance Center (QHPC) ==
Located in Lahore, the Qalandars High-Performance Center (QHPC) provides facilities such as gyms, astro and turf pitches, speed guns, and access to coaching personnel. In addition to physical training, it provides courses in various areas such as fitness, injury management, nutrition, doping regulations, game comprehension, conduct ethics, anti-corruption protocols, career strategies, sports psychology, and media communications.

== Graduates ==
- Haris Rauf
- Salman Irshad
- Zaman Khan
- Dilbar Hussain
- Sohail Akhtar
- Ahmed Daniyal
- Maaz Khan
- Mirza Tahir Baig
- Mohammad Naeem
- Salman Mirza
