= Charlie Hara-Hinze =

Japanese cricketer

Personal information
- Born: 30 September 2008 (age 18); Japan
- Nickname: Mame
- Batting: Left-handed
- Bowling: Slow left-arm orthodox
- Role: Bowling all-rounder

International information
- National side: Japan (2024–present)
- T20I debut (cap 20): 4 February 2024 v Maldives
- Last T20I: 26 September 2026 v Nepal
- T20I shirt no.: 30

Career statistics
Competition	T20I
Matches	41
Runs scored	155
Batting average	11.07
100s/50s	0/0
Top score	23*
Balls bowled	795
Wickets	49
Bowling average	14.06
5 wickets in innings	1
10 wickets in match	0
Best bowling	5/6
Catches/stumpings	7/-
- Source: ESPNcricinfo, 26 September 2026

Charlie Hara-Hinze (born 30 September 2008), is a Japanese cricketer who plays for the Japan national cricket team. He is also a member of the Japan under-19 team and most recently represented the team at the 2026 Under-19 Men's Cricket World Cup.

He plays for the South Kanto Super Kings in the Japan Premier League and was also the captain of the Vipers team in the Japan Futures League.

== Youth career ==
Hinze developed through Japan's domestic age-group cricket system, hewas part of Japan's side for the 2023 and 2025 Under-19 Premier Cup helping the team qualify for 2023 Under-19 Asia Cup and 2024 Under-19 Asia Cup, where he made headlines after taking the wicket of Vaibhav Sooryavanshi.

In April 2025, Hinze was named in Japan under-19 team's squad for the 2026 Under-19 World Cup East Asia-Pacific qualifier. He was named player of the series for his impactful campaign that helped the team qualify for the 2026 Under-19 Men's Cricket World Cup in which he took 12 wickets and scored 92 runs across four innings. He was subsequently named in Japan's squad for the under-19 World Cup.

In November 2025, He played for the Western Suburbs' under-17 during the Queensland Premier Cricket. In a match against the Northern Suburbs, he played an anchoring innings of 99 runs, stitching a 117-run partnership with Eli Brian after the Western were reduced to 55/3. Following his innings, he took six wickets for just four runs, helping bowl out the opposition for seven runs.

== International career ==
In January 2024, Hinze was named in Japan's squad for 2024 ACC Challenger Cup. At just 15 years of age, he made his Twenty20 International (T20I) debut against Maldives on 4 January 2024. He finished the tournament with just a wicket.

On 11 May 2024, in just his 10th T20I, Hinze became the youngest player to take a five-wicket haul in a T20I, recording figures of 5/6 against Mongolia.

He was named in Japan's squad for the 2024 T20 World Cup EAP qualifier, where he took 6 wickets in five matches. At the 2026 EAP qualifier, he was the third highest wicket-taker with 10 wickets across five matches.

In September 2026, he was named for the historic one-off T20I against India. He made headlines once again after dismissing Abhishek Sharma for a golden duck and subsequently taking the wicket of Shreyas Iyer. Having previously cited Ravindra Jadeja as his inspiration, he was dubbed the "Japanese Jadeja" by fans online following his performance against India. Following this series, he also took part in the 2026 Asian Games.

As of September 2026, he is the third highest wicket-taker for Japan in T20Is with 49 wickets across 41 matches.

== Personal life ==
His two brothers, Gabriel and Montgomery, are also cricketers and were both part of Japan's squad at the 2026 Under-19 Cricket World Cup alongside Charlie.
