= Mohammad Naeem (cricketer, born 1999) =

Pakistani cricketer (born 1999)

Personal information
- Full name: Mohammad Naeem
- Born: 10 April 1999 (age 27); Kurram District, Khyber Pakhtunkhwa, Pakistan
- Batting: Right-handed
- Role: Batter

Domestic team information
- Years: Team
- 2017–2023: FATA
- 2025–present: Lahore Qalandars

Career statistics
Competition	First-class	T20
Matches	2	21
Runs scored	62	424
Batting average	20.66	23.47
100s/50s	0/0	0/3
Top score	25*	65
Balls bowled	24	50
Wickets	0	2
Bowling average	–	34.00
5 wickets in innings	0	0
10 wickets in match	0	0
Best bowling	–	1/12
Catches/stumpings	0/–	7/–
- Source: ESPNcricinfo, 27 May 2025

Mohammad Naeem (born 10 April 1999) is a Pakistani cricketer who plays as a right-handed batter. He represents Lahore Qalandars in the Pakistan Super League (PSL) and has previously played for the FATA region in domestic cricket.

== Early career ==
Born in the former Federally Administered Tribal Areas (FATA), now part of the Khyber Pakhtunkhwa province, Naeem began his cricketing career representing the FATA region and its Under-19 team.

Naeem began his involvement with professional cricket through the Lahore Qalandars' Player Development Program (PDP) in 2016. He was initially identified during the program’s inaugural open trials, which aimed to expand access to cricketing opportunities across Pakistan. By 2018, Naeem had participated in PDP trials held in multiple locations, including Rawalpindi, Jamrud, and Abbottabad. His performance during these trials led to his selection for the Rawalpindi team in the PDP tournament. In 2020, he took part in the Battle of Qalandars competition and was a member of the team Gulberg Nawab, which won the tournament. In 2022, he was selected for the Lahore Qalandars' PDP Class of 2022 and took part in an international development tour to Namibia, gaining experience in overseas conditions and exposure to higher levels of competition.

== Domestic and franchise career ==
Naeem's domestic career includes playing for the FATA region and its Under-19 team.

=== Pakistan Super League ===
In 2025, Muhammad Naeem was selected by the Lahore Qalandars in the supplementary category for the PSL X. He appeared in 12 matches during the season, scoring 314 runs at an average of 26.16 and a strike rate of 162.69. His performance included three half-centuries, with a highest score of 65. Over the course of the tournament, he hit 29 fours and 23 sixes.

In the final of the 2025 Pakistan Super League, held on 25 May 2025, Muhammad Naeem scored 46 runs off 27 balls, including six sixes, contributing to the Lahore Qalandars' six-wicket victory over the Quetta Gladiators. His overall performance during the season earned him the "Emerging Player of the Tournament" award.
