= Cricket at the 2026 Asian Games – Men's Qualifier =

2026 Men's Asian Games Qualifier
- Dates: 31 May – 8 June 2026
- Administrator: Olympic Council of Asia
- Cricket format: Twenty20 International
- Tournament format(s): Group round-robin and knockouts
- Host: Singapore
- Champions: Nepal (1st title)
- Runners-up: Hong Kong
- Participants: 7
- Matches: 13
- Player of the series: (Nepal) Kushal Bhurtel
- Most runs: (Nepal) Kushal Bhurtel (340)
- Most wickets: (Hong Kong) Ehsan Khan (11) (Malaysia) Vijay Unni (11)

The 2026 Men's Asian Games Qualifier was the qualification tournament for the men's cricket event at the 2026 Asian Games. It was held from 31 May to 9 June 2026 in Singapore. The tournament served as the primary pathway to determine the final four teams advancing to the main event in Nagoya, Japan.

The qualification process determined the final ten-team lineup, with six spots filled automatically by the host nation Japan and the region's five ICC Full members. The final four berths were decided through this tournament, where seven teams were split into two groups, with the top two from each group advancing to the semi-finals. The semi-finalists qualified for the main tournament in Japan.

Hong Kong, Malaysia, Nepal and Oman advanced to the semi-finals and hence qualified for the Asian Games.

== Squads ==
Bahrain	China	Hong Kong	Malaysia	Nepal	Oman	Singapore
Junaid Aziz (c); Numan Yousuf (vc); Abdul Samad; Abdul Rauf; Muhammad Adil; Mohammad Hamza (wk); Mohamad Junaid Khushi; Abdulla Pervaiz (wk); Shujaat Rasool; Hamza Riaz; Mohammed Sameer; Abid Ullah Shah; Mohammad Waleed; Yousif Wali; Abdullah Mohd Yousaf; Sameer Yousuf	Tian Sen Qun (c); Chen Zhuo Yue; Deng Jinqi; Du Jianhao; Du Jianyao (wk); Luo Shilin; Ma Qiancheng; Meng Jianhao; Qi Shuai; Yang Wangjie; Zhao Zhilong; Shenjian Zheng; Zhuang Zelin; Zong Yuechao	Yasim Murtaza (c); Babar Hayat (vc); Mohammad Ghazanfar; Hafeez Khan; Anas Khan; Ehsan Khan; Nizakat Khan; Shiv Mathur (wk); Hassan Khan Mohammad; Waheed Mohammad; Nasrulla Rana; Anshuman Rath; Ayush Shukla; Shahid Wasif (wk)	Syed Aziz (c); Muhammad Haziq Aiman (wk); Muhammad Akram; Adeshlie Alias; Azri Azhar; Amir Khan; Aslam Khan; Rahim Khan; Sharvin Muniandy; Pavandeep Singh; Virandeep Singh; Muhamad Syahadat; Vijay Unni	Dipendra Singh Airee (c); Shahab Alam; Lokesh Bam (wk); Kushal Bhurtel; Sundeep Jora; Sompal Kami; Karan KC; Sandeep Lamichhane; Kushal Malla; Sher Malla; Rohit Paudel; Aarif Sheikh; Aasif Sheikh (wk); Nandan Yadav	Sufyan Mehmood (c); Muzaffar Shiralkar (vc, wk); Abdul Jalil (wk); Faris Al Balushi; Issa Al Balushi; Mohammed Al Balushi; Munthir Al Balushi; Nawed Al Balushi; Rashad Al Balushi; Shuaib Al Balushi; Wasim Al Balushi; Zubair Al Balushi; Ahmed Al Zadjali; Sameer Othman	Rezza Gaznavi (c); Jeevan Santhanam (vc); Harsha Bharadwaj; Mahiyu Bhatiya; Girin Gune; Aslan Jafri; Neil Karnik; Neel Mittal (wk); Ishaan Sawney; Mason Arthur Sherry; Pratham Somani (wk); Venkatesan Thiyanesh; Daksh Tyagi; Aaron Varghese; Kapish Venkatraman

Despite not being included in the initial squads, Abdul Rauf and Abid Ullah Shah of Bahrain, alongside Singapore's Aaron Varghese, featured in the tournament's matches.

== Group stage ==
=== Group A ===
==== Points table ====
Pos	Team	Pld	W	L	NR	Pts	NRR	Qualification
1	Nepal	2	2	0	0	4	9.700	Advanced to semi-finals
2	Malaysia	2	1	1	0	2	−2.041	Advanced to semi-finals
3	China	2	0	2	0	0	−9.899	Eliminated

Source: Cricinfo

==== Fixtures ====
31 May 2026
09:30
Scorecard

Nepal; 313/2 (20 overs)	v	China; 92 (19.2 overs)
Kushal Bhurtel 129 (43); Ma Qiancheng 1/51 (4 overs); Deng Jinqi 1/51 (4 overs)		Shenjian Zheng 31 (15); Kushal Malla 3/0 (1.2 overs)

Nepal won by 221 runs
Singapore National Cricket Ground, Singapore
Umpires: Anand Natarajan (Sin) and Narayanan Sivan (Mas)
Player of the match: Kushal Bhurtel (Nep)

- China won the toss and elected to field.
- Du Jianhao, Du Jianyao, Yang Wangjie and Zhao Zhilong (Chn) all made their T20I debuts.
- Kushal Bhurtel (Nep) scored his 2,000th run in T20Is.
- Kushal Bhurtel (Nep) hit six sixes in one over, off the bowling of Chen Zhuo Yue, becoming the sixth player to achieve this in men's T20Is.

2 June 2026
14:30
Scorecard

China; 84/9 (20 overs)	v	Malaysia; 85/1 (7.5 overs)
Zong Yuechao 29 (51); Vijay Unni 4/8 (4 overs)		Muhammad Haziq Aiman 44* (28); Tian Sen Qun 1/29 (2 overs)

Malaysia won by 9 wickets
Singapore National Cricket Ground, Singapore
Umpires: John Prakash (HK) and Riaz Ur Rahman (Idn)
Player of the match: Vijay Unni (Mas)

- Malaysia won the toss and elected to field.
- Qi Shuai (Chn) made his T20I debut.
- Nepal and Malaysia advanced to the semi-finals and secured qualification for the men's tournament as a result of this match.

4 June 2026
14:30
Scorecard

Nepal; 275/7 (20 overs)	v	Malaysia; 108/9 (20 overs)
Kushal Bhurtel 126 (54); Virandeep Singh 3/22 (4 overs)		Syed Aziz 54 (45); Sher Malla 3/14 (4 overs)

Nepal won by 167 runs
Singapore National Cricket Ground, Singapore
Umpires: Samad Akbar (Tha) and John Prakash (HK)
Player of the match: Kushal Bhurtel (Nep)

- Malaysia won the toss and elected to field.
- Kushal Bhurtel became the first Nepalese batsman to hit 100 sixes in T20Is.

=== Group B ===
==== Points table ====
Pos	Team	Pld	W	L	NR	Pts	NRR	Qualification
1	Hong Kong	3	3	0	0	6	6.260	Advanced to semi-finals
2	Oman	3	2	1	0	4	−2.309	Advanced to semi-finals
3	Bahrain	3	1	2	0	2	−1.011	Eliminated
4	Singapore (H)	3	0	3	0	0	−2.738	Eliminated

Source: Cricinfo
(H) Host

==== Fixtures ====
1 June 2026
09:30
Scorecard

Oman; 149/7 (15 overs)	v	Singapore; 143/6 (15 overs)
Mohammed Al Balushi 44 (26); Mahiyu Bhatia 2/4 (1 over)		Rezza Gaznavi 49 (33); Nawed Al Balushi 4/22 (3 overs)

Oman won by 7 runs (DLS method)
Singapore National Cricket Ground, Singapore
Umpires: John Prakash (HK) and Narayanan Sivan (Mas)
Player of the match: Nawed Al Balushi (Oma)

- Singapore won the toss and elected to field.
- Singapore were set a revised target of 151 runs in 15 overs due to rain.
- Jeevan Santhanam, Pratham Somani, Aaron Varghese, Kapish Venkatraman (Sin), Abdul Jalil, Issa Al Balushi, Mohammed Al Balushi, Nawed Al Balushi, Shuaib Al Balushi, Wasim Al Balushi, Zubair Al Balushi, Ahmad Al Zadjali, Sameer Othman and Muzaffar Shiralkar (Oma) all made their T20I debuts.

1 June 2026
14:30
Scorecard

Bahrain; 173/9 (20 overs)	v	Hong Kong; 175/2 (16 overs)
Numan Yousuf 42 (28); Nasrulla Rana 3/29 (4 overs)		Babar Hayat 93* (48); Muhammad Adil 1/26 (2 overs)

Hong Kong won by 8 wickets
Singapore National Cricket Ground, Singapore
Umpires: Samad Akbar (Tha) and Anand Natarajan (Sin)
Player of the match: Babar Hayat (HK)

- Hong Kong won the toss and elected to field.
- Muhammad Adil, Mohammad Hamza, Abdulla Pervaiz, Abid Ullah Shah, Numan Yousuf and Sameer Yousuf (Bhr) all made their T20I debuts.

3 June 2026
09:30
Scorecard

Oman; 184/4 (20 overs)	v	Bahrain; 164/5 (20 overs)
Mohammed Al Balushi 81 (51); Muhammad Adil 2/20 (3 overs)		Junaid Aziz 46 (36); Sameer Othman 2/34 (4 overs)

Oman won by 20 runs
Singapore National Cricket Ground, Singapore
Umpires: Ugyen Dorji (Bhu) and Anand Natarajan (Sin)
Player of the match: Mohammed Al Balushi (Oma)

- Bahrain won the toss and elected to field.
- Rashad Al Balushi (Oma) made his T20I debut.
- Oman advanced to the semi-finals and secured qualification for the men's tournament as a result of this match.

3 June 2026
14:30
Scorecard

Singapore; 61 (12.3 overs)	v	Hong Kong; 64/1 (6.3 overs)
Girin Gune 21 (16); Mohammad Ghazanfar 3/6 (3 overs)		Anshuman Rath 32* (20); Harsha Bharadwaj 1/27 (2.3 overs)

Hong Kong won by 9 wickets
Singapore National Cricket Ground, Singapore
Umpires: Samad Akbar (Tha) and Narayanan Sivan (Mas)
Player of the match: Mohammad Ghazanfar (HK)

- Singapore won the toss and elected to bat.
- Neel Mittal (Sin) made his T20I debut.
- Hong Kong advanced to the semi-finals and secured qualification for the men's tournament as a result of this match.

5 June 2026
09:30
Scorecard

Bahrain; 212/8 (20 overs)	v	Singapore; 210/6 (20 overs)
Shujaat Rasool 54 (16); Jeevan Santhanam 3/31 (4 overs)		Mahiyu Bhatia 57 (25); Shujaat Rasool 3/33 (4 overs)

Bahrain won by 2 runs
Singapore National Cricket Ground, Singapore
Umpires: Samad Akbar (Tha) and Riaz Ur Rahman (Idn)
Player of the match: Shujaat Rasool (Bhr)

- Singapore won the toss and elected to field.
- Abdul Rauf, Mohamad Junaid Khushi and Hamza Riaz (Bhr) all made their T20I debuts.

5 June 2026
14:30
Scorecard

Hong Kong; 287/1 (20 overs)	v	Oman; 133/8 (20 overs)
Anshuman Rath 140* (56); Nawed Al Balushi 1/49 (3 overs)		Zubair Al Balushi 40 (23); Ehsan Khan 4/12 (4 overs)

Hong Kong won by 154 runs
Singapore National Cricket Ground, Singapore
Umpires: Ugyen Dorji (Bhu) and Narayanan Sivan (Mas)
Player of the match: Anshuman Rath (HK)

- Oman won the toss and elected to field.
- Faris Al Balushi and Munthir Al Balushi (Oma) both made their T20I debuts.

== Knockout stage ==
=== Bracket ===
Semi-finals
B2	Oman	94 (19.4 overs)
A1	Nepal	95/2 (9.2 overs)
A2	Malaysia	114/9 (20 overs)
B1	Hong Kong	120/4 (18.2 overs)

Final
SFW2	Hong Kong	188/7 (20 overs)
SFW1	Nepal	114/2 (11.3 overs)
3rd place play-off
SFL1	Oman	90 (19.2 overs)
SFL2	Malaysia	91/2 (10 overs)

=== Semi-finals ===
7 June 2026
09:30
Scorecard

Oman; 94 (19.4 overs)	v	Nepal; 95/2 (9.2 overs)
Sufyan Mehmood 38 (42); Karan KC 3/20 (4 overs)		Lokesh Bam 44* (26); Sameer Othman 2/36 (4 overs)

Nepal won by 8 wickets
Singapore National Cricket Ground, Singapore
Umpires: John Prakash (HK) and Narayanan Sivan (Mas)
Player of the match: Karan KC (Nep)

- Oman won the toss and elected to bat.

7 June 2026
14:30
Scorecard

Malaysia; 114/9 (20 overs)	v	Hong Kong; 120/4 (18.2 overs)
Virandeep Singh 45 (41); Ehsan Khan 4/20 (4 overs)		Shahid Wasif 59* (42); Vijay Unni 2/16 (4 overs)

Hong Kong won by 6 wickets
Singapore National Cricket Ground, Singapore
Umpires: Samad Akbar (Tha) and Anand Natarajan (Sin)
Player of the match: Ehsan Khan (HK)

- Hong Kong won the toss and elected to field.

=== 3rd place play-off ===
8 June 2026
09:30
Scorecard

Oman; 90 (19.2 overs)	v	Malaysia; 91/2 (10 overs)
Mohammed Al Balushi 25 (37); Virandeep Singh 3/7 (4 overs)		Syed Aziz 54* (29); Shuaib Al Balushi 1/13 (3 overs)

Malaysia won by 8 wickets
Singapore National Cricket Ground, Singapore
Umpires: Ugyen Dorji (Bhu) and Riaz Ur Rahman (Idn)
Player of the match: Virandeep Singh (Mas)

- Malaysia won the toss and elected to field.

=== Final ===
8 June 2026
14:30
Scorecard

Hong Kong; 188/7 (20 overs)	v	Nepal; 114/2 (11.3 overs)
Anshuman Rath 80 (45); Sher Malla 4/32 (4 overs)		Kushal Bhurtel 65 (40); Ayush Shukla 1/20 (3 overs)

Nepal won by 19 runs (DLS method)
Singapore National Cricket Ground, Singapore
Umpires: Samad Akbar (Tha) and Anand Natarajan (Sin)
Player of the match: Sher Malla (Nep)

- Nepal won the toss and elected to field.
- No further play was possible due to rain.
- Dipendra Singh Airee (Nep) played in his 100th T20I match.

== See also ==
- Cricket at the 2026 Asian Games – Men's tournament
- Cricket at the 2026 Asian Games – Women's Qualifier
- Cricket at the 2026 Asian Games – Women's tournament
- 2026 Asian Games
