= Kōrogi Athletic Park =

Sports complex and park in Nisshin, Japan

Coordinates: 35.1651°N 137.0488°E

- 愛知県口論義運動公園
- Greenery at the Kōrogi Athletic Park
- Interactive map of Kōrogi Athletic Park
- Location: Nishikorogi-323-8 Kitashincho, Nisshin, Aichi 470-0103 Japan
- Type: Sports complex

Construction
- Opened: October 1983

Website
- www.kourogi.jp

Ground information
- Tenants: Japan national cricket team 2026 Asian Games
- End names
- Kosenjo End; University End

International information
- First men's T20I: 8 May 2026: Fiji v Vanuatu
- Last men's T20I: 3 October 2026: India v Pakistan
- First women's T20I: 17 September 2026: Thailand v Pakistan
- Last women's T20I: 22 September 2026: India v Sri Lanka
- As of 3 October 2026; Source: Kōrogi Sports Park

Kōrogi Athletic Park (愛知県口論義運動公園, Aichi-ken Kōrogi Undō Kōen), sometimes called the Kōrogi Sports Park, is a sports complex in Nisshin, Japan.

The Kōrogi Athletic Park was opened in October 1983. The legal basis for the park was via Aichi Prefecture Ordinance on Sports Facilities and Social Education Facilitie (Ordinance No. 6) which was enacted on March 24, 1971.

== Facilities ==
=== Cricket and baseball ground ===
The cricket ground is one of the few facilities in Japan that is being developed for the 2026 Asian Games where cricket will be hosted. It features multiple playing strips and dedicated practice nets. The seating capacity of the cricket grounds was increased to 2,000 via temporary stands.

The ground is also used for baseball. In its baseball configuration, the grounds can accommodate three baseball diamonds.

The ground is also scheduled to be one of the venues for the 2026 Men's T20 World Cup East Asia-Pacific Sub-regional Qualifier in May 2026. The cricket tournament that will form part of the qualification process for the 2028 Men's T20 World Cup.

=== Football field ===
The Kōrogi Sports Park has a 105 by 68 meters (344 ft × 223 ft) artificial pitch which can also be used for football and rugby. It has a seating capacity of 3,000.

=== Aquatics center ===
The aquatics center of Kōrogi Sports Park has two swimming pools: an eight-lane 50-meter (160 ft) pool and a five-lane 50-meter (160 ft) pool.

=== Tennis courts ===
There are 16 tennis courts at the Kōrogi Sports Park. Courts No. 1 to 14 and sand-filled courts with a seating capacity of 2,400. Courts No. 15 and 16 are artificial grass courts with a seating capacity of 1,400.

== List of century in Cricket ==
=== T20 Internationals ===
Men's

Century in T20I matches at Kōrogi Athletic Park
No.	Bowler	Team	Opposing Team	Inn	R	O	4s	6s	SR	Date	Result
1	Tony Ura	Papua New Guinea	South Korea	1	106*	55	8	4	192.72	9 May 2026	Won

Women's

Century in T20I matches at Kōrogi Athletic Park
No.	Bowler	Team	Opposing Team	Inn	R	O	4s	6s	SR	Date	Result
1	Shafali Verma	India	Bangladesh	1	100*	49	3	9	204.08	20 September 2026	Won

== See also ==
- Cricket in Japan
- Japan men's national cricket team
- Japan women's national cricket team
- Japan Cricket Association
- ICC East Asia-Pacific
- Asian Cricket Council
- Aichi–Nagoya, Men's & Women's tournament
