= Shiv Mathur =

Hong Kong cricketer

Personal information
- Born: January 20, 2008 (age 18); Hong Kong, China
- Height: 177 cm (5 ft 10 in)
- Batting: Right-handed
- Bowling: Right arm Medium
- Role: Batsman

International information
- National side: Hong Kong
- T20I debut: September 19 2023 v Malaysia
- T20I shirt no.: 19

Shiv Mathur (born 20 January 2008) is a Hong Kong cricketer. He captained the Hong Kong U16 National Team in 2023, and went on to become the Hong Kong U19 National Team Captain. He became the youngest player to ever make their debut for the Hong Kong Mens National Side in 2023, playing in the 19th Asian Games in Hangzhou. Since then, he has regularly represented the Hong Kong Mens and U19 Sides in tournaments and series.

== Career ==
Mathur made his T20I debut against Malaysia on September 19, 2023, and has since represented Hong Kong in several international tournaments, including the 19th Asian Games and the DP World Asia Cup Rising Stars 2025. He has also captained the Hong Kong U19 team in the ICC U19 World Cup Qualifiers, and the ACC U19 Premier Cup.
