= Player auction =

Bidding to acauire a player for a team

Player auction is a significant aspect of modern sports leagues, prominently observed in cricket and baseball, where teams bid to acquire players for a specific tournament or season. The process involves a blend of strategy, finance, and talent assessment.

A cricket player auction is an event where cricketers are auctioned off by teams for money. Cricket player auctions are held by cricket leagues from India, Pakistan, Sri Lanka, Bangladesh and England. The first cricket player auction was held in 2008 by the Indian Premier League. In India, player auctions are popular and broadcast on television.

== Examples and rules ==
Cricket player auctions are held by the Indian Premier League, Bangladesh Premier League, Lanka Premier League, Big Bash League and Pakistan Super League. The Women's Premier League player auction is an example for female cricket players. Baseball player auction are held by Major League Baseball.

=== IPL rules ===
The auction is conducted as an English auction. Players must be put for auction by their respective cricket associations and meet the eligibility criteria set by the BCCI. Each player sets their own starting price as the entry point for the application. Each team can have a maximum of 25 players, with a limit on the number of Indian and overseas players. As in the main round, players will be called one by one and franchises will raise their bats to bid. Bids increase in ₹2 million (US$21,000) increments until the ₹10 million (US$110,000) mark is reached. After ₹10 million (US$110,000) and ₹20 million (US$210,000) the price is raised by ₹2.5 million (US$26,000) increments, and after ₹20 million (US$210,000), by ₹5 million (US$53,000) steps.

=== LPL rules ===
The rules of the Lanka Premier League auction are similar to that of the IPL. Each of the five teams receives US$500,000 in prize money. Each team signs four players from this sum and enters the auction with the amount it has left. The players are either capped and uncapped. Capped players have starting prices ranging from US$10,000 to US$50,000 in increments of US$10,000. Uncapped players start at US$5,000, US$10,000 or US$20,000 depending on their domestic and franchise cricket performance and experience. The final squad size for each team is between 20 and 24 players. Each team is required to have 6 overseas players in the squad.

=== MLB rules in 1998–2013 ===
In the years 1998–2013, the Major League Baseball used a sealed bid auction. Interested MLB clubs gave sealed bids for a specific player to the Commissioner's Office within 4 days.

== Notable transactions ==
Annabel Sutherland was bought in 2023 for ₹2 crore (US$210,000) by Delhi Capitals. More transactions can be found here:

- 2013 Bangladesh Premier League player auction
- List of 2008 Indian Premier League auctions and personnel signings
- List of 2011 Indian Premier League personnel changes
- List of 2013 Indian Premier League personnel changes
- List of 2015 Indian Premier League personnel changes
- List of 2016 Indian Premier League personnel changes
- List of 2018 Indian Premier League personnel changes

== Research ==
The IPL player auction has also been topic for scientific research, for example for building models for the prediction of the selection of a player based on their experience. From an auction theory perspective, the IPL uses an English ascending bid auction with physically present bidders. In comparison, the Major League Baseball uses a sealed bid auction for free agents. Analysis of the data of 2008's IPL tournament has shown that youth and certain nationalities have a positive effect on the price of a player. Becoming 1 year older means a loss of US$19,991. Being Australian adds US$240,790 and being Indian adds US$323,900 to the value of a player.

== Discussion ==
Cricket player auctions by Indian Premier League, Big Bash League and others are also considered by some to be a commodification of human life. Prof. Atanu Biswas compared the IPL auction to auctions at the All India Cattle Show. Sharad Yadav of the Janata Dal party described the IPL auction in 2008 as "a vulgar display of wealth, with even a Padma Vibhushan-winner being put up for auction". Manish Tewari tweeted in 2018: "Auction of humans used to take place in barbaric ages. Can't there be a more dignified method of evaluating skill and talent?" Cricket New Zealand CEO Heath Mills added to Tewari's disapproval: "Apart from the public disappointment of players being passed in, those who are picked up are treated badly by modern standards." However, Prof. Cate Watson has argued that the commercialisation of cricket and its players has enhanced the spirit of the game.
