= Salman Mirza =

Pakistani cricketer (born 1994)

Personal information
- Full name: Muhammad Salman Mirza
- Born: 1 January 1994 (age 32); Lahore, Punjab, Pakistan
- Batting: Right-handed
- Bowling: Left-arm medium
- Role: Bowler

International information
- National side: Pakistan
- T20I debut (cap 122): 20 July 2025 v Bangladesh
- Last T20I: 24 February 2026 v England

Domestic team information
- Years: Team
- 2021; 2025: Lahore Qalandars
- 2022: Central Punjab
- 2023: Mountaineers
- 2024–present: Clydach Cricket Club
- 2026: Islamabad United

Career statistics
Competition	T20I	FC	LA	T20
Matches	17	6	5	43
Runs scored	9	229	3	47
Batting average	4.50	28.62	–	5.87
100s/50s	0/0	0/1	0/0	0/0
Top score	4*	64	3*	16*
Balls bowled	346	1,062	210	886
Wickets	23	31	2	65
Bowling average	16.13	21.54	90.00	15.84
5 wickets in innings	0	1	0	0
10 wickets in match	0	0	0	0
Best bowling	3/14	6/42	1/23	4/11
Catches/stumpings	0/–	1/–	0/–	5/–
Medal record
Men's cricket
Representing Pakistan
Asia Cup
Runner-up	2025 UAE
- Source: Cricinfo, 8 March 2026

Mohammad Salman Mirza (born 1 January 1994) is a Pakistani cricketer.

== Domestic and franchise career ==
Mirza was discovered by Lahore Qalandars during their Player Development Program trails. He made his Twenty20 debut on 21 February 2021, for Lahore Qalandars in the 2021 Pakistan Super League. He made his List-A debut on 24 November 2023, for Mountaineers in Pro50 Championship and his first class debut on 6 December 2023, in the 2023-24 Logan Cup for Mountaineers.

=== Pakistan Super League ===
Mirza was picked by the Lahore Qalandars for Pakistan Super League Season 2025 in the Supplementary category. He played four matches, won two Player of the Match awards, and played a vital role in the later stages of Lahore Qalandars' PSL 10 campaign.

His notable performances during the PSL 10 included 4/31 against Peshawar Zalmi, including a double strike that dismissed Mohammad Haris and Max Bryant in consecutive deliveries, effectively ending Zalmi's chase on a batting-friendly surface. He was later made Player of the Match again for his 3/16 against Islamabad United.

== International career ==
In July 2025, Mirza was announced to be part of the national squad for its T20I series in the tour of Bangladesh. He made his international debut in the 1st T20I, where he took 2/23 in 3.3 overs in a losing cause. In the 2nd match, he took 2/17 in 4 overs, again in a losing cause. In the 3rd and final match, which Pakistan won, Mirza was again the pick of the bowlers, with 3/19 in 4 overs, having dismantled Bangladesh's top order alongside Faheem Ashraf with the new ball, reducing them to 25 for 5.

In October 2025, in the second home T20I against South Africa, he was selected ahead of Shaheen Shah Afridi and made an immediate impact with the new ball, dismissing the top-order to leave South Africa struggling at 23 for 4. He ended with 3/14 in 4 overs and was declared Player of the Match.
