= Hassan Nawaz (cricketer) =

Pakistani cricketer (born 2002)

Hasan Nawaz new pakistan player
Personal information
- Born: 21 August 2002 (age 24); Islamabad, Pakistan
- Batting: Right-handed
- Bowling: Right-arm medium
- Role: Middle-order batter

International information
- National side: Pakistan
- ODI debut (cap 254): 8 August 2025 v West Indies
- Last ODI: 31 October 2026 v Sri Lanka
- T20I debut (cap 120): 16 March 2025 v New Zealand
- Last T20I: 13 October 2026 v Sri Lanka
- T20I shirt no.: 7

Domestic team information
- Years: Team
- 2022/23: Northern
- 2023: Islamabad United
- 2023/24–: Islamabad
- 2023/24: Pakistan Television
- 2024/25: Sui Northern Gas Pipelines
- 2025-present: Quetta Gladiators

Career statistics
Competition	ODI	T20I	FC	LA
Matches	9	30	13	17
Runs scored	298	616	667	549
Batting average	49.66	24.64	29.00	39.21
100s/50s	0/2	1/3	1/4	0/4
Top score	79	105*	169	79
Balls bowled	–	–	84	66
Wickets	–	–	3	2
Bowling average	–	–	19.33	18.50
5 wickets in innings	–	–	0	0
10 wickets in match	–	–	0	–
Best bowling	–	–	3/58	2/20
Catches/stumpings	1/–	18/–	9/–	6/–
Medal record
Men's cricket
Representing Pakistan
Asia Cup
Runner-up	2025 UAE
Asian Games
Silver medal – second place	2026 Aichi–Nagoya	Team
- Source: Cricinfo, 5 November 2026

Muhammad Hassan Nawaz Thind (Note: Saraiki: محمد حسن نواز تھند) (born 21 August 2002) is a Pakistani cricketer who plays as a right-handed top-order batter. In March 2025, he received his maiden international call-up for Pakistan's tour of New Zealand. He made his Twenty20 International (T20I) debut on 16 March 2025 against New Zealand at Hagley Oval, Christchurch. On 21 March 2025, he scored his maiden T20I century, an unbeaten 105 off 45 balls in the third T20I of the series, becoming the youngest Pakistani to score a T20I hundred and the fastest for a Pakistani.

== Early career ==
Nawaz grew up in Layyah, Punjab, a region with limited cricketing infrastructure. He began playing tape-ball cricket in his hometown before moving to Islamabad under the pretext of pursuing studies, where he stayed with his sister who supported his early ambitions. He joined the Lashings Cricket Club in Islamabad at the age of 14, representing the club for several years in the Islamabad Cricket Association (ICA) League before moving to the Lucky Star Cricket Club. His performances at club level earned him selection for the ICA Under-19 team, where he gained wider recognition. Nawaz's consistent domestic form led to his inclusion in the Kashmir Premier League in 2022, marking his entry into professional cricket.

== Domestic career ==
In August 2022, he was named to Northern's squad for the 2022-23 National T20 Cup. Before being selected by Northern, he played for the Mirpur Royals in the Kashmir Premier League, where he was the second top-scorer. In PSL Season 8, he played for Islamabad United. In PSL Season 10, he has been picked by Quetta Gladiators.

== International career ==
In March 2025, Nawaz received his maiden international call-up for Pakistan's tour of New Zealand. On 16 March 2025, he made his Twenty20 International (T20I) debut against New Zealand at Hagley Oval, Christchurch. On 21 March 2025, he scored his maiden T20I century, an unbeaten 105 in 45 balls in the third T20I of the series, which became the fastest T20I hundred by a Pakistan batter.

On 8 August 2025, he made his One Day International (ODI) debut in the first ODI of the Pakistan tour of West Indies. He scored a match-winning 63* (54) in a tense chase and was declared Player of the Match.

Nawaz played in the Tri-Nation series in UAE in August. He scored 56 runs versus the United Arab Emirates helping Pakistan win. He was also part of Pakistan's squad for the 2025 Asia Cup.

In October 2025, the Pakistan Cricket Board (PCB) named Nawaz in both the 15-member T20I squad and the 16-member ODI squad for the home series against South Africa and Sri Lanka.

In June 2026, he was named in the 15-member men's squad announced for the 2026 Asian Games. On 3 October 2026, Pakistan won the silver medal after losing in the Asian Games men’s cricket final against India at the Kōrogi Athletic Park in Nisshin, Japan.

== Playing style ==
Nawaz is a right-handed batter known for his aggressive stroke play and power-hitting ability in the middle order. Standing tall and using long levers to generate natural power, Nawaz is capable of hitting down the ground as well as improvising square of the wicket, combining physical strength with flexibility. Initially used as a top-order batter, he found greater success after being moved lower down the lineup, where his capacity to accelerate the scoring rate became more effective. His batting is marked by clean striking, strong use of the crease, and an ability to clear the boundary on both sides of the wicket.
