= 2025–26 President's Trophy Grade-I =

Cricket tournament

- Dates: 28 December 2025 – 12 February 2026
- Administrator: Pakistan Cricket Board
- Cricket format: First-class (4-day)
- Tournament format(s): Round robin and final
- Champions: Water and Power Development Authority (1st title)
- Runners-up: Sui Northern Gas Pipelines Limited
- Participants: 8
- Matches: 29
- Most runs: Abdullah Fazal (622)
- Most wickets: Mohammad Hamza (47)

The 2025–26 President's Trophy Grade-I was a first-class domestic cricket competition in Pakistan, played from December 2025 to February 2026. It was contested by eight departmental teams across venues in Karachi. In December 2025, the Pakistan Cricket Board (PCB) confirmed the fixtures for the tournament.

Pakistan Television were the defending champions, having defeated State Bank of Pakistan by three wickets in the 2024–25 final.

Water and Power Development Authority won their maiden title defeating Sui Northern Gas Pipelines Limited in the final by 35 runs.

== Teams ==
Eight teams were competed in the tournament:

- Ghani Glass
- Khan Research Laboratories
- Oil & Gas Development Company Limited
- Pakistan Television
- Sahir Associates
- State Bank of Pakistan
- Sui Northern Gas Pipelines Limited
- Water and Power Development Authority

Seven of the nine teams that contested the 2024–25 tournament were joined by Sahir Associates, which got promoted to Grade-I after winning the title of 2025–26 President's Trophy Grade-II. Eshaal Associates and Higher Education Commission were demoted to the Grade II competition.

== Competition format ==
The eight departmental teams played each other in a round-robin format, therefore playing seven matches each. There were 29 matches: seven rounds of four matches each, followed by a final between the top two teams.

== Points table ==
Pos	Team	Pld	W	L	D	Pts	Qualification
1	Sui Northern Gas Pipelines Limited	7	5	2	0	137	Advanced to the final
2	Water and Power Development Authority	7	4	2	1	120	Advanced to the final
3	State Bank of Pakistan	7	4	3	0	104	
4	Khan Research Laboratories	7	3	3	1	99	
5	Ghani Glass	7	3	4	0	93	
6	Pakistan Television	7	3	4	0	89	
7	Sahir Associates	7	3	4	0	80	Relegation to President's Trophy Grade-II
8	Oil & Gas Development Company Limited	7	1	4	2	65	Relegation to President's Trophy Grade-II

Source: ESPNcricinfo

== League stage ==
=== Round 1 ===
28–25 December 2025
Scorecard

Sui Northern Gas Pipelines Limited; 575/5d (105.5 overs)	v	Sahir Associates; 136 (45.2 overs) & 288 (82.2 overs) (f/o)

Sui Northern Gas Pipelines Limited won by an innings and 151 runs
National Bank of Pakistan Sports Complex, Karachi
Points: Sui Northern Gas Pipelines Limited 30, Sahir Associates 0

28–25 December 2025
Scorecard

Khan Research Laboratories; 116 (46.4 overs) & 197 (52.2 overs)	v	Water and Power Development Authority; 151 (51.2 overs) & 163/4 (46 overs)

Water and Power Development Authority won by 6 wickets
National Stadium, Karachi
Points: Water and Power Development Authority 23, Khan Research Laboratories 7

28–25 December 2025
Scorecard

Oil & Gas Development Company Limited; 196 (60 overs) & 127 (45 overs)	v	Ghani Glass; 246 (85.4 overs) & 80/3 ( overs)

Ghani Glass won by 7 wickets
United Bank Limited Sports Complex, Karachi
Points: Ghani Glass 23, Oil & Gas Development Company Limited 5

28–25 December 2025
Scorecard

Pakistan Television; 99 (30.4 overs) & 293 (72.5 overs)	v	State Bank of Pakistan; 153 (64.2 overs) & 161 (35.4 overs)

Pakistan Television won by 78 runs
State Bank of Pakistan Sports Complex, Karachi
Points: Pakistan Television 23, State Bank of Pakistan 7

=== Round 2 ===
3–6 January 2026
Scorecard

Khan Research Laboratories; 204 (54.2 overs) & 146 (31.4 overs)	v	Sahir Associates; 123 (34.3 overs) & 221 (57 overs)

Khan Research Laboratories won by 6 runs
National Stadium, Karachi
Points: Khan Research Laboratories 23, Sahir Associates 6

3–6 January 2026
Scorecard

Pakistan Television; 199 (57.1 overs) & 214 (54.5 overs)	v	Oil & Gas Development Company Limited; 302 (90.2 overs) & 113/2 (21.5 overs)

Oil & Gas Development Company Limited won by 8 wickets
United Bank Limited Sports Complex, Karachi
Points: Oil & Gas Development Company Limited 25, Pakistan Television 4

3–6 January 2026
Scorecard

State Bank of Pakistan; 202 (58 overs) & 307 (75.1 overs)	v	Ghani Glass; 174 (57.2 overs) & 133 (32.3 overs)

State Bank of Pakistan won by 202 runs
National Bank of Pakistan Sports Complex, Karachi
Points: State Bank of Pakistan 23, Ghani Glass 6

3–6 January 2026
Scorecard

Sui Northern Gas Pipelines Limited; 147 (60.3 overs) & 183 (66 overs)	v	Water and Power Development Authority; 276 (71.4 overs) & 55/2 (13.4 overs)

Water and Power Development Authority won by 8 wickets
State Bank of Pakistan Sports Complex, Karachi
Points: Water and Power Development Authority 24, Sui Northern Gas Pipelines Limited 5

=== Round 3 ===
9–12 January 2026
Scorecard

Water and Power Development Authority; 323 (89.2 overs)	v	Sahir Associates; 103 (39.2 overs) & 188 (46.2 overs) (f/o)

Water and Power Development Authority won by an innings and 32 runs
United Bank Limited Sports Complex, Karachi
Points: Water and Power Development Authority 27, Sahir Associates 4

9–12 January 2026
Scorecard

Sui Northern Gas Pipelines Limited; 263 (102.5 overs) & 75 (36.3 overs)	v	State Bank of Pakistan; 115 (32.4 overs) & 175 (47.1 overs)

Sui Northern Gas Pipelines Limited won by 48 runs
State Bank of Pakistan Sports Complex, Karachi
Points: Sui Northern Gas Pipelines Limited 24, State Bank of Pakistan 3

9–12 January 2026
Scorecard

Oil & Gas Development Company Limited; 244 (82.4 overs) & 377 (120.5 overs)	v	Khan Research Laboratories; 347 (105.5 overs) & 82/2 (22 overs)

Match drawn
National Bank of Pakistan Sports Complex, Karachi
Points: Khan Research Laboratories 13, Oil & Gas Development Company Limited 6

9–12 January 2026
Scorecard

Pakistan Television; 186 (38.4 overs) & 193 (58.2 overs)	v	Ghani Glass; 223 (57.2 overs) & 68 (14 overs)

Pakistan Television won by 88 runs
National Stadium, Karachi
Points: Pakistan Television 22, Ghani Glass 7

=== Round 4 ===
15–18 January 2026
Scorecard

Sahir Associates; 248 (97 overs) & 164 (75.4 overs)	v	Oil & Gas Development Company Limited; 257 (106.2 overs) & 91 (29 overs)

Sahir Associates won by 64 runs
Karachi City Cricket Association Stadium, Karachi
Points: Sahir Associates 18, Oil & Gas Development Company Limited 6

15–18 January 2026
Scorecard

State Bank of Pakistan; 106 ( overs) & 302 (79.2 overs)	v	Khan Research Laboratories; 368 (130.3 overs) & 42/0 (8.4 overs)

Khan Research Laboratories won by 10 wickets
State Bank of Pakistan Sports Complex, Karachi
Points: Khan Research Laboratories 26, State Bank of Pakistan 0

15–18 January 2026
Scorecard

Pakistan Television	v	Sui Northern Gas Pipelines Limited
166 (66.2 overs); Amad Butt 46* (64); Shehzad Gul 4/40 (16.2 overs)		238 (67.3 overs); Saifullah Bangash 71 (104); Ali Usman 4/66 (28 overs)
111 (42.5 overs); Mohammad Taha 27 (123); Shehzad Gul 5/28 (12.5 overs)		37 (19.4 overs); Saifullah Bangash 14 (35); Ali Usman 6/9 (9.4 overs)

Pakistan Television won by 2 runs
National Stadium, Karachi
Umpires: Rana Arshad and Imran Javed

- Sui Northern Gas Pipelines Limited won the toss and elected to field.
- This is the lowest total defended in first-class cricket, breaking the 232-year-old record between Oldfield and Marylebone Cricket Club (Target 41 runs) in the England Domestic Season 1794.
- Points: Pakistan Television 22, Sui Northern Gas Pipelines Limited 7

15–18 January 2026
Scorecard

Ghani Glass; 142 (46.4 overs) & 323 (92.3 overs)	v	Water and Power Development Authority; 223 (67.1 overs) & 136 (45.3 overs)

Ghani Glass won by 106 runs
United Bank Limited Sports Complex, Karachi
Points: Ghani Glass 22, Water and Power Development Authority 7

=== Round 5 ===
21–24 January 2026
Scorecard

Sui Northern Gas Pipelines Limited; 452 (122.3 overs) & 39/0 (8.5 overs)	v	Ghani Glass; 201 (60.5 overs) & 289 (98.1 overs) (f/o)

Sui Northern Gas Pipelines Limited won by 10 wickets
National Stadium, Karachi
Points: Sui Northern Gas Pipelines Limited 25, Ghani Glass 1

21–24 January 2026
Scorecard

Sahir Associates; 240 (89 overs) & 122 ( overs)	v	State Bank of Pakistan; 300 (94 overs) & 64/1 (13.5 overs)

State Bank of Pakistan won by 9 wickets
State Bank of Pakistan Sports Complex, Karachi
Points: State Bank of Pakistan 24, Sahir Associates 5

21–24 January 2026
Scorecard

Pakistan Television; 414 (102.1 overs) & 94 (27.1 overs)	v	Khan Research Laboratories; 434 (108.5 overs) & 77/1 ( overs)

Khan Research Laboratories won by 9 wickets
United Bank Limited Sports Complex, Karachi
Points: Khan Research Laboratories 22, Pakistan Television 6

21–24 January 2026
Scorecard

Oil & Gas Development Company Limited; 159 (57.1 overs) & 267/8d (104 overs)	v	Water and Power Development Authority; 297 (73.3 overs) & 83/3 (24 overs)

Match drawn
Karachi City Cricket Association Stadium, Karachi
Points: Oil & Gas Development Company Limited 11, Water and Power Development Authority 12

=== Round 6 ===
27–30 January 2026
Scorecard

Ghani Glass; 155 (42.2 overs) & 200 (67.2 overs)	v	Sahir Associates; 167 (64 overs) & 191/4 (45.4 overs)

Sahir Associates won by 6 wickets
State Bank of Pakistan Sports Complex, Karachi
Points: Sahir Associates 23, Ghani Glass 7

27–30 January 2026
Scorecard

Sui Northern Gas Pipelines Limited; 199 (61.3 overs) & 209 (93.5 overs)	v	Khan Research Laboratories; 175 (61.4 overs) & ( overs)

Karachi City Cricket Association Stadium, Karachi

27–30 January 2026
Scorecard

Oil & Gas Development Company Limited; 76 (26 overs) & 222 (79.1 overs)	v	State Bank of Pakistan; 388 (93.2 overs)

State Bank of Pakistan won by an innings and 90 runs
National Stadium, Karachi
Points: State Bank of Pakistan 28, Oil & Gas Development Company Limited 4

27–30 January 2026
Scorecard

Pakistan Television; 269 (79.3 overs) & 150 (38.1 overs)	v	Water and Power Development Authority; 240 (65.2 overs) & 183/3 (44.2 overs)

Water and Power Development Authority won by 7 wickets
United Bank Limited Sports Complex, Karachi
Points: Water and Power Development Authority 21, Pakistan Television 7

=== Round 7 ===
2–5 February 2026
Scorecard

Pakistan Television; 267 (60.3 overs) & 138 (36.2 overs)	v	Sahir Associates; 389 (92.4 overs) & 19/0 (3 overs)

Sahir Associates won by 10 wickets
National Stadium, Karachi
Points: Sahir Associates 24, Pakistan Television 5

2–5 February 2026
Scorecard

Sui Northern Gas Pipelines Limited; 182 (66.2 overs) & 181 (53.4 overs)	v	Oil & Gas Development Company Limited; 192 (70.4 overs) & 148 (55.3 overs)

Sui Northern Gas Pipelines Limited won by 23 runs
United Bank Limited Sports Complex, Karachi
Points: Sui Northern Gas Pipelines Limited 23, Oil & Gas Development Company Limited 7

2–5 February 2026
Scorecard

Khan Research Laboratories; 189 (61.1 overs) & 64 (20.4 overs)	v	Ghani Glass; 354 (113.1 overs)

Ghani Glass won by an innings and 101 runs
Karachi City Cricket Association Stadium, Karachi
Points: Ghani Glass 27, Khan Research Laboratories 1

2–5 February 2026
Scorecard

State Bank of Pakistan; 394 (83.1 overs) & 373/4d (64 overs)	v	Water and Power Development Authority; 412 (131.4 overs) & 145 (31.3 overs)

State Bank of Pakistan won by 210 runs
State Bank of Pakistan Sports Complex, Karachi
Points: State Bank of Pakistan 19, Water and Power Development Authority 6

== Final ==
8–12 February 2026
Scorecard

Water and Power Development Authority	v	Sui Northern Gas Pipelines Limited
265 (82.1 overs); Ayaz Tasawwar 57 (108); Aamer Jamal 4/67 (20.1 overs)		117 (45.1 overs); Azan Awais 48 (117); Naqeebullah 4/20 (16.1 overs)
96 (33.5 overs); Khalid Usman 18 (18); Shahnawaz Dahani 4/23 (11.5 overs)		209 (49.1 overs); Omair Yousuf 63 (109); Aqib Khan 5/56 (14 overs)

Water and Power Development Authority won by 35 runs
Gaddafi Stadium, Lahore
Umpires: Rashid Riaz and Qaiser Waheed

- Sui Northern Gas Pipelines Limited won the toss and elected to field.
