= 2024–25 President's Cup Grade-I (1-Day) =

Cricket tournament

- Dates: 3 – 16 October 2024
- Administrator: Pakistan Cricket Board
- Cricket format: List A
- Tournament format(s): Round-robin and Knock-out
- Host: Pakistan
- Champions: State Bank of Pakistan (1st title)
- Participants: 9
- Matches: 19
- Player of the series: Faheem Ashraf (Pakistan Television)
- Most runs: Umar Amin (State Bank of Pakistan) (281)
- Most wickets: Faisal Akram (Pakistan Television) (13)
- Official website: pcb.pk

The 2024–25 President's Cup Grade-I (1-Day) was the second edition of the President's Cup, a List A cricket competition in Pakistan. The tournament began on 3 October 2024 and the final held on 16 October 2024.

State Bank of Pakistan won their maiden title after beating defending champion Sui Northern Gas Pipelines by 7 wickets in the final.

== Teams ==
Group A	Group B
Higher Education Commission	Eshaal Associates
Khan Research Laboratories	Ghani Glass
State Bank of Pakistan	Oil & Gas Development
Water and Power Development Authority	Pakistan Television
—	Sui Northern Gas Pipelines

== Points table ==
=== Group A ===
Pos	Team	Pld	W	L	T	NR	BP	Pts	NRR	Qualification
1	Water and Power Development	3	3	0	0	0	5	35	0.872	Advanced to Semi-final
2	State Bank of Pakistan	3	2	1	0	0	8	28	1.951	Advanced to Semi-final
3	Khan Research Laboratories	3	1	2	0	0	5	15	0.087	
4	Higher Education Commission	3	0	3	0	0	0	0	−2.763	

Source: ESPNcricinfo

=== Group B ===
Pos	Team	Pld	W	L	T	NR	BP	Pts	NRR	Qualification
1	Pakistan Television	4	3	1	0	0	9	39	0.442	Advanced to Semi-final
2	Sui Northern Gas Pipelines	4	2	1	1	0	6	35	0.692	Advanced to Semi-final
3	Eshaal Associates	4	2	1	1	0	1	30	0.420	
4	Oil & Gas Development	4	1	3	0	0	1	11	−0.515	
5	Ghani Glass	4	1	3	0	0	1	11	−1.028	

Source: ESPNcricinfo

== Knockout stage ==
=== Semi-finals ===
==== 1st Semi-final ====
13 October 2024
15:00 (D/N)
Scorecard

Sui Northern Gas Pipelines; 333/6 (50 overs)	v	Water and Power Development; 259 (45.3 overs)
Rizwan Mehmood 136* (116); Ali Raza 2/86 (10 overs)		Khalid Usman 73 (67); Hasan Nawaz 2/20 (6 overs)

Sui Northern Gas Pipelines won by 74 runs
Jinnah Stadium, Gujranwala
Umpires: Mohammad Asif and Zulfiqar Jan

- Water and Power Development won the toss and elected to field.
- Saad Masood (Sui Northern Gas Pipelines) made his List A debut.
- Rizwan Mehmood (Sui Northern Gas Pipelines) scored his first century in List A cricket.

==== 2nd Semi-final ====
14 October 2024
15:00 (D/N)
Scorecard

State Bank of Pakistan; 342/9 (50 overs)	v	Pakistan Television; 271 (42.5 overs)
Rameez Aziz 57 (54); Aqib Liaqat 2/61 (10 overs)		Sahibzada Farhan 75 (86); Kashif Bhatti 3/34 (10 overs)

State Bank of Pakistan won by 71 runs
Jinnah Stadium, Gujranwala
Umpires: Khalid Mahmood and Ahsan Raza

- State Bank of Pakistan won the toss and elected to bat.

=== Final ===
16 October 2024
15:00 (D/N)
Scorecard

Sui Northern Gas Pipelines; 165 (37.3 overs)	v	State Bank of Pakistan; 169/3 (43.4 overs)
Mirza Baig 48 (51); Kashif Bhatti 3/28 (9 overs)		Imran Butt 68* (133); Yasir Shah 1/24 (10 overs)

State Bank of Pakistan won by 7 wickets
Jinnah Stadium, Gujranwala
Umpires: Faisal Afridi and Ahsan Raza
Player of the match: Mohammad Abbas (State Bank of Pakistan)

- Sui Northern Gas Pipelines won the toss and elected to bat.
