= 2024–25 President's Trophy Grade-I =

Cricket tournament

- Dates: 8 January 2025 – 8 March 2025
- Administrator: Pakistan Cricket Board
- Cricket format: First-class (4-day)
- Tournament format(s): Round robin and final
- Host: Pakistan
- Champions: Pakistan Television (1st title)
- Runners-up: State Bank of Pakistan
- Participants: 9
- Matches: 37
- Player of the series: Muhammad Shahzad (Pakistan TV)
- Most runs: Ayaz Tasawwar (867)
- Most wickets: Mushtaq Ahmed (52)

The President's Trophy Grade-I was a first-class domestic cricket competition in Pakistan, played from January to March 2025. It was contested by nine departmental teams, across four venues in Karachi, with the final being played in Rawalpindi. In January 2025, the Pakistan Cricket Board (PCB) had confirmed the fixtures for the tournament.

Pakistan Television won the final, defeating State Bank of Pakistan by three wickets.

== Teams ==
Nine teams played in the tournament:

- Eshaal Associates
- Oil & Gas Development Company Limited
- Sui Northern Gas Pipelines Limited
- Pakistan Television
- State Bank of Pakistan
- Water and Power Development Authority
- Khan Research Laboratories
- Higher Education Commission
- Ghani Glass

The seven teams that contested the 2023–24 tournament were joined by Eshaal Associates and Oil and Gas Development Company Limited, two teams new to first-class cricket.

== Competition format ==
The nine departmental teams played each other in a round-robin format, therefore playing eight matches each. The tournament consisted of 37 matches: nine rounds of four matches each, followed by a final between the top two teams. The bottom two teams will be relegated to the President's Trophy Grade-II tournament.

== Points table ==
Pos	Team	Pld	W	L	D	Pts	Qualification
1	Pakistan TV	8	5	2	1	149	Advanced to the final
2	State Bank of Pakistan	8	5	2	1	149	Advanced to the final
3	Ghani Glass	8	5	2	1	136	
4	Oil and Gas	8	5	3	0	133	
5	Water and Power	8	3	3	2	98	
6	Khan Research Laboratories	8	1	3	4	88	
7	Sui Northern	8	2	6	0	80	
8	Higher Education Commission	8	2	5	1	79	Relegation to President's Trophy Grade-II
9	Eshaal Associates	8	2	4	2	76	Relegation to President's Trophy Grade-II

Source: ESPNcricinfo

== League stage ==
=== Round 1 ===
8–11 January 2025
Scorecard

Sui Northern	v	Pakistan TV
406 (98.3 overs); Qasim Akram 138 (171); Amad Butt 4/85 (31.1 overs)		333 (81.4 overs); Mohammad Taha 86 (183); Aftab Ibrahim 3/62 (16 overs)
261 (62 overs); Arafat Minhas 57 (55); Israr Hussain 3/52 (18 overs)		335/6 (67 overs); Taimur Khan 108* (106); Aftab Ibrahim 3/63 (14 overs)

Pakistan TV won by 4 wickets
HPC Oval Ground, Karachi
Umpires: Zulfiqar Jan and Imran Javed

- Pakistan TV won the toss and elected to field.
- Arafat Minhas (Sui Northern) made his first-class debut.
- Points: Pakistan TV 22, Sui Northern 8

8–11 January 2025
Scorecard

Oil and Gas	v	State Bank of Pakistan
171 (62.1 overs); Hasan Raza 84 (126); Kashif Bhatti 4/35 (16.1 overs)		172 (54.1 overs); Fawad Alam 82* (142); Mushtaq Ahmed 3/48 (13 overs)
369 (111 overs); Adil Amin 117* (180); Niaz Khan 5/86 (30 overs)		240/9 (89.2 overs); Fawad Alam 106 (242); Mushtaq Ahmed 4/66 (17 overs)

Oil and Gas won by 128 runs
State Bank of Pakistan Sports Complex, Karachi
Umpires: Tariq Rasheed and Kashif Sohail

- Oil and Gas won the toss and elected to bat.
- Mohammad Huzaifa and Raja Hamza Waheed (Oil and Gas) both made their first-class debuts.
- Points: Oil and Gas 23, State Bank of Pakistan 7

8–11 January 2025
Scorecard

Water and Power	v	Khan Research Laboratories
268 (83.3 overs); Mohammad Ammar Khan 75 (126); Arshadullah 4/51 (22 overs)		152 (48.2 overs); Imran Rafiq 54 (81); Mohammad Zeeshan 3/32 (10.2 overs)
313/7d (77.4 overs); Muhammad Akhlaq 125 (181); Arshadullah 7/77 (23.4 overs)		140/9 (40.3 overs); Imran Rafiq 38 (39); Muhammad Adil 4/44 (12 overs)

Water and Power won by 290 runs
National Bank of Pakistan Sports Complex, Karachi
Umpires: Imtiaz Iqbal and Qaiser Waheed

- Khan Research Laboratories won the toss and elected to field.
- Mohammad Zeeshan (Water and Power) made his first-class debut.
- Points: Water and Power 24, Khan Research Laboratories 5

8–11 January 2025
Scorecard

Eshaal Associates	v	Higher Education Commission
341 (77.2 overs); Danish Aziz 121 (156); Mohammad Azab 5/118 (23.2 overs)		224 (60.2 overs); Muhammad Mohsin Khan 54 (69); Tahir Hussain 4/46 (16 overs)
288/8 (71 overs); Azan Awais 119 (171); Maaz Khurram 3/61 (17 overs)		213 (64.5 overs); Mohammad Zubair 51 (59); Usman Tariq 5/62 (18 overs)

Eshaal Associates won by 192 runs
National Stadium, Karachi
Umpires: Khalid Mahmood and Mohammad Sajid

- Higher Education Commission won the toss and elected to field.
- Faham-ul-Haq, Maaz Khurram, Mehmood Nawaz Afridi, Mehmood Nawaz Afridi, Mohammad Sudais, Mohammad Zubair and Usman Tariq all made their first-class debuts.
- Mohammad Azab (Higher Education Commission) took his first five-wicket haul in first-class cricket.
- Points: Eshaal Associates 24, Higher Education Commission 4

=== Round 2 ===
14–17 January 2025
Scorecard

Oil and Gas	v	Sui Northern
197 (64.5 overs); Abdul Rehman Muzammil 68* (142); Mohammad Hamza 4/33 (16.5 overs)		198 (72.1 overs); Shahzaib Khan 76 (148); Aamer Yamin 3/38 (19 overs)
178 (60.4 overs); Adil Amin 54 (156); Shehzad Gul 4/33 (16.4 overs)		180/3 (44.4 overs); Qasim Akram 58* (37); Mushtaq Ahmed 1/29 (11 overs)

Sui Northern won by 7 wickets
United Bank Limited Sports Complex, Karachi
Umpires: Imtiaz Iqbal and Zulfiqar Jan

- Oil and Gas won the toss and elected to bat.
- Points: Sui Northern 23, Oil and Gas 7

14–17 January 2025
Scorecard

Pakistan TV	v	State Bank of Pakistan
93 (43.1 overs); Shamyl Hussain 27 (70); Muhammad Ismail 4/19 (10 overs)		414/9d (98.1 overs); Umar Amin 101 (137); Mehran Sanwal 5/103 (28.1 overs)
215 (67.3 overs); Shamyl Hussain 49 (104); Muhammad Ismail 5/92 (19 overs)

State Bank of Pakistan won by an innings and 106 runs
State Bank of Pakistan Sports Complex, Karachi
Umpires: Khalid Mahmood and Tariq Rasheed

- State Bank of Pakistan won the toss and elected to field.
- Salman Khan (Pakistan TV) made his first-class debut.
- Points: State Bank of Pakistan 29, Pakistan TV 4

14–17 January 2025
Scorecard

Higher Education Commission	v	Khan Research Laboratories
137 (46.1 overs); Uzair Mumtaz 26 (47); Arshadullah 5/31 (17.1 overs)		183 (57.3 overs); Saad Baig 66 (98); Mohammad Azab 5/59 (21.3 overs)
239 (83 overs); Obaid Shahid 72 (145); Arshadullah 5/65 (22 overs)		63 (21.5 overs); Saad Baig 12 (12); Mohammad Azab 4/13 (8.5 overs)

Higher Education Commission won by 130 runs
National Bank of Pakistan Sports Complex, Karachi
Umpires: Imran Javed and Qaiser Waheed

- Higher Education Commission won the toss and elected to bat.
- Mohammad Qaiser (Khan Research Laboratories) made his first-class debut.
- Points: Higher Education Commission 23, Khan Research Laboratories 7

14–17 January 2025
Scorecard

Ghani Glass	v	Eshaal Associates
379 (79.2 overs); Tayyab Tahir 139* (176); Danish Aziz 3/60 (12 overs)		293 (80.5 over); Umar Siddiq 127 (164); Afaq Afridi 3/45 (18 overs)
242 (56.3 overs); Sharjeel Khan 53 (57); Nisar Ahmad 3/61 (14 overs)		99/9 (24.5 overs); Nisar Ahmad 36 (25); Ubaid Shah 4/44 (7 overs)

Ghani Glass won by 229 runs
National Stadium, Karachi
Umpires: Aaley Haider and Mohammad Sajid

- Eshaal Asscciates won the toss and elected to field.
- Points: Ghani Glass 24, Eshaal Associates 5

=== Round 3 ===
20–23 January 2025
Scorecard

Sui Northern; 224 (73.2 overs) & 139 (52.3 overs)	v	State Bank of Pakistan; 300 (76.3 overs) & 85/3 (14.3 overs)

State Bank of Pakistan won by 7 wickets
National Bank of Pakistan Sports Complex, Karachi
Points: State Bank of Pakistan 24, Sui Northern 5

20–23 January 2025
Scorecard

Pakistan TV; 335 (85.3 overs) & 456/3 (113.2 overs)	v	Khan Research Laboratories; 479 (147.1 overs)

Match drawn
State Bank of Pakistan Sports Complex, Karachi
Points: Pakistan TV 8, Khan Research Laboratories 11

20–23 January 2025
Scorecard

Oil and Gas; 346 (122.2 overs) & 182 (50.5 overs)	v	Water and Power; 208/9 (80 overs) & 258/9 (65 overs)

Oil and Gas won by 62 runs
Karachi City Cricket Association Stadium, Karachi
Points: Oil and Gas 23, Water and Power 1

20–23 January 2025
Scorecard

Higher Education Commission; 140 (45.5 overs) & 152/9 (47 overs)	v	Ghani Glass; 191 (37.4 overs) & 103/0 (13.4 overs)

Ghani Glass won by 10 wickets
United Bank Limited Sports Complex, Karachi
Points: Ghani Glass 23, Higher Education Commission 7

=== Round 4 ===
26–29 January 2025
Scorecard

Sui Northern; 334 (97.5 overs) & 152 (48.2 overs)	v	Khan Research Laboratories; 280 (81.5 overs) & 207/6 (53 overs)

Khan Research Laboratories won by 4 wickets
State Bank of Pakistan Sports Complex, Karachi
Points: Khan Research Laboratories 21, Sui Northern 7

26–29 January 2025
Scorecard

Eshaal Associates; 164 (46 overs) & 279 (69.1 overs)	v	Pakistan TV; 531/9d (114 overs)

Pakistan TV won by an innings and 88 runs
National Bank of Pakistan Sports Complex, Karachi
Points: Pakistan TV 30, Eshaal Associates 2

26–29 January 2025
Scorecard

Water and Power; 250 (78.5 overs) & 241 (77.4 overs)	v	State Bank of Pakistan; 347 (102.5 overs) & 158/9 (41.2 overs)

State Bank of Pakistan won by 1 wickets
HPC Oval Ground, Karachi
Points: State Bank of Pakistan 24, Water and Power 3

26–29 January 2025
Scorecard

Oil and Gas; 80 (34.1 overs) & 266 (107.5 overs)	v	Ghani Glass; 145 (38.5 overs) & 149 (41.4 overs)

Oil and Gas won by 52 runs
United Bank Limited Sports Complex, Karachi
Points: Oil and Gas 23, Ghani Glass 7

=== Round 5 ===
1–4 February 2025
Scorecard

Ghani Glass; 238 (55.2 overs) & 329 (82.2 overs)	v	Pakistan TV; 325 (85.3 overs) & 248/3 (42.2 overs)

Pakistan TV won by 7 wickets
HPC Oval Ground, Karachi
Points: Pakistan Television 24, Ghani Glass 4

1–4 February 2025
Scorecard

Oil and Gas; 187 (48.1 overs) & 292 (82.5 overs)	v	Eshaal Associates; 325 (93 overs) & 159/4 (36.3 overs)

Eshaal Associates won by 6 wickets
United Bank Limited Sports Complex, Karachi
Points: Eshaal Associates 25, Oil and Gas 4

1–4 February 2025
Scorecard

Higher Education Commission; 126 (40 overs) & 321 (86.3 overs)	v	State Bank of Pakistan; 155 (46.2 overs) & 295/6 (99.5 overs)

State Bank of Pakistan won by 4 wickets
State Bank of Pakistan Sports Complex, Karachi
Points: State Bank of Pakistan 23, Higher Education Commission 7

1–4 February 2025
Scorecard

Water and Power; 370 (117.4 overs) & 18/1 (3.5 overs)	v	Sui Northern; 98 (38.1 overs) & 288 (86.2 overs) (f/o)

Water and Power won by 9 wickets
National Stadium, Karachi
Points: Water and Power 25, Sui Northern 3

=== Round 6 ===
7–10 February 2025
Scorecard

Higher Education Commission; 179 (43.4 overs) & 292 (76.1 overs)	v	Sui Northern; 113 (34.5 overs) & 198 (59 overs)

Higher Education Commission won by 160 runs
United Bank Limited Sports Complex, Karachi
Points: Higher Education Commission 23, Sui Northern 7

7–10 February 2025
Scorecard

Pakistan TV; 421 (102.5 overs) & 112 (45.4 overs)	v	Water and Power; 180 (52.5 overs) & 355/7 (121.2 overs)

Water and Power won by 3 wickets
National Bank of Pakistan Sports Complex, Karachi
Points: Water and Power 19, Pakistan TV 11

7–10 February 2025
Scorecard

State Bank of Pakistan; 415 (111.4 overs) & 221/3d (41 overs)	v	Eshaal Associates; 275 (82.1 overs) & 197 (49.1 overs)

State Bank of Pakistan won by 164 runs
State Bank of Pakistan Sports Complex, Karachi
Points: State Bank of Pakistan 24, Eshaal Associates 2

7–10 February 2025
Scorecard

Khan Research Laboratories; 406 (97.1 overs) & 288 (101.2 overs)	v	Ghani Glass; 499 (137.4 overs) & 31/1 (9 overs)

Match drawn
Karachi City Cricket Association Stadium, Karachi
Points: Khan Research Laboratories 11, Ghani Glass 10

=== Round 7 ===
12–15 February 2025
Scorecard

Sui Northern; 270 (83.5 overs) & 340 (86.3 overs)	v	Ghani Glass; 435 (117 overs) & 176/5 (35.2 overs)

Ghani Glass won by 5 wickets
State Bank of Pakistan Sports Complex, Karachi
Points: Ghani Glass 23, Sui Northern 2

12–15 February 2025
Scorecard

Pakistan TV; 425 (108.3 overs)	v	Higher Education Commission; 179 (47.2 overs) & 152 (35.2 overs) (f/o)

Pakistan TV won by an innings and 94 runs
Karachi City Cricket Association Stadium, Karachi
Points: Pakistan TV 28, Higher Education Commission 1

12–15 February 2025
Scorecard

Oil and Gas; 238 (85.4 overs) & 165 (48 overs)	v	Khan Research Laboratories; 174 (54.1 overs) & 200 (62.1 overs)

Oil and Gas won by 29 runs
United Bank Limited Sports Complex, Karachi
Points: Oil and Gas 23, Khan Research and Laboratories 6

12–15 February 2025
Scorecard

Water and Power; 391 (121.4 overs) & 246/9d (73.1 overs)	v	Eshaal Associates; 270 (70 overs) & 195/4 (62 overs)

Match drawn
National Bank of Pakistan Sports Complex, Karachi
Points: Water and Power 11, Eshaal Associates 6

=== Round 8 ===
19–22 February 2025
Scorecard

Oil & Gas Development Company Limited; 278 (92.5 overs) & 249 (78.5 overs)	v	Pakistan TV; 273 (78.3 overs) & 259/4 (53.4 overs)

Pakistan TV won by 6 wickets
National Bank of Pakistan Sports Complex, Karachi
Points: Pakistan TV 22, Oil and Gas 6

19–22 February 2025
Scorecard

State Bank of Pakistan; 233 (51.5 overs) & 123 (24.4 overs)	v	Ghani Glass; 204 (49 overs) & 153/5 (32.3 overs)

Ghani Glass won by 5 wickets
United Bank Limited Sports Complex, Karachi
Points: Ghani Glass 22, State Bank of Pakistan 6

19–22 February 2025
Scorecard

Khan Research Laboratories; 353 (99.2 overs) & 355/5d (82.2 overs)	v	Eshaal Associates; 199 (62.4 overs) & 277/6 (106 overs)

Match drawn
State Bank of Pakistan Sports Complex, Karachi
Points: Khan Research Laboratories 15, Eshaal Associates 9

19–22 February 2025
Scorecard

Water and Power; 261 (83.1 overs) & 412/6d (114.4 overs)	v	Higher Education Commission; 324 (107.4 overs) & 130/1 (32 overs)

Match drawn
Karachi City Cricket Association Stadium, Karachi
Points: Higher Education Commission 11, Water and Power 10

=== Round 9 ===
25–28 February 2025
Scorecard

Sui Northern; 346 (102.5 overs) & 306 (75.3 overs)	v	Eshaal Associates; 147 (69.5 overs) & 110/3 (16 overs)

Sui Northern won by 7 wickets
United Bank Limited Sports Complex, Karachi
Points: Sui Northern 25, Eshaal Associates 3

25–28 February 2025
Scorecard

Oil and Gas; 431 (111 overs) & 256/3d (58.5 overs)	v	Higher Education Commission; 293 (79.2 overs) & 284 (98.5 overs)

Oil and Gas won by 110 runs
State Bank of Pakistan Sports Complex, Karachi
Points: Oil and Gas 24, Higher Education Commission 3

25–28 February 2025
Scorecard

State Bank of Pakistan; 119 (32.2 overs) & 568/9d (153 overs)	v	Khan Research Laboratories; 150 (48.4 overs) & 384/3 (108.4 overs)

Match drawn
Karachi City Cricket Association Stadium, Karachi
Points: State Bank of Pakistan 12, Khan Research Laboratories 12

25–28 February 2025
Scorecard

Ghani Glass; 286 (81 overs) & 270 (58 overs)	v	Water and Power; 132/9 (28 overs) & 145 (40.1 overs)

Ghani Glass won by 279 runs
National Bank of Pakistan Sports Complex, Karachi
Points: Ghani Glass 23, Water and Power 5

== Final ==
This was the first time whole first-class game was played under floodlights with pink ball in Pakistan domestic cricket.

4–8 March 2025 (N)
Scorecard

State Bank of Pakistan	v	Pakistan Television
205 (54.2 overs); Imran Butt 89 (136); Muhammad Shahzad 5/29 (10.2 overs)		317 (89.2 overs); Muhammad Shahzad 125 (152); Kashif Bhatti 3/53 (21.2 overs)
264 (76.2 overs); Rameez Aziz 47 (163); Amad Butt 5/85 (27 overs)		154/7 (40.1 overs); Shamyl Hussain 58 (94); Kashif Bhatti 4/58 (13.1 overs)

Pakistan TV won by 3 wickets
Rawalpindi Cricket Stadium, Rawalpindi
Umpires: Zulfiqar Jan and Asif Yaqoob
Player of the match: Muhammad Shahzad (Pakistan TV)

- Pakistan TV won the toss and elected to field.
- Muhammad Shahzad (Pakistan TV) took his first hat-trick and took his five-wicket haul in first-class cricket.
