= 2025–26 President's Cup Grade-I (1-Day) =

Cricket tournament

- Dates: 8 – 25 December 2025
- Administrator: Pakistan Cricket Board
- Cricket format: List A
- Tournament format(s): Round-robin and Knock-out
- Champions: Khan Research Laboratories (1st title)
- Participants: 8
- Matches: 31
- Player of the series: Iftikhar Ahmed (Khan Research Laboratories)
- Most runs: Shahzaib Khan (Khan Research Laboratories) – 485
- Most wickets: Sufiyan Muqeem (Khan Research Laboratories) – 20
- Official website: pcb.pk

The 2025–26 President's Cup Grade-I (1-Day) was the third edition of the President's Cup, a List A cricket competition in Pakistan. The tournament began on 8 December 2025, and the final was held on 25 December 2025.

State Bank of Pakistan were the defending champion.

== Points table ==
Pos	Team	Pld	W	L	T	NR	BP	Pts	NRR	Qualification
1	Oil & Gas Development Company Limited	7	7	0	0	0	18	88	0.930	Advanced to Semi-final
2	Khan Research Laboratories	7	4	3	0	0	22	62	0.820	Advanced to Semi-final
3	Sui Northern Gas Pipelines Limited	7	4	3	0	0	18	58	0.870	Advanced to Semi-final
4	Pakistan Television	7	4	3	0	0	7	47	0.170	Advanced to Semi-final
5	Sahir Associates	7	3	4	0	0	8	38	−0.200	
6	Ghani Glass	7	3	4	0	0	7	37	−0.820	
7	State Bank of Pakistan	7	2	5	0	0	8	28	−0.250	
8	Water and Power Development Authority	7	1	6	0	0	7	17	−1.570	

Source: PCBESPNcricinfo

== Round-robin ==
=== Round 1 ===
8 December 2025
scorecard

Ghani Glass; 192 (41.1 overs)	v	Pakistan Television; 196 (31.5 overs)

Pakistan Television won by 7 wickets
HPC Oval Ground, Karachi

8 December 2025
scorecard

Sui Northern Gas Pipelines Limited; 379/6 (50 overs)	v	Water and Power Development Authority; 213 (48.2 overs)

Sui Northern Gas Pipelines Limited won by 166 runs
Karachi City Cricket Association Stadium, Karachi

8 December 2025
scorecard

Sahir Associates; 129 (33.5 overs)	v	Khan Research Laboratories; 130/3 (26.1 overs)

Khan Research Laboratories won by 7 wickets
Naya Nazimabad Cricket Ground, Karachi

8 December 2025
scorecard

State Bank of Pakistan; 302/5 (50 overs)	v	Oil & Gas Development Company Limited; 303/7 (48.5 overs)

Oil & Gas Development Company Limited won by 3 wickets
United Bank Limited Sports Complex, Karachi

=== Round 2 ===
10 December 2025
scorecard

Pakistan Television; 268/9 (50 overs)	v	Oil & Gas Development Company Limited; 271/5 (46 overs)

Oil & Gas Development Company Limited won by 5 wickets
HPC Oval Ground, Karachi

10 December 2025
scorecard

Sahir Associates; 257/9 (50 overs)	v	State Bank of Pakistan; 258/5 (48.4 overs)

State Bank of Pakistan won by 5 wickets
Karachi City Cricket Association Stadium, Karachi

10 December 2025
scorecard

Ghani Glass; 193 (48 overs)	v	Water and Power Development Authority; 199/1 (35.2 overs)

Water and Power Development Authority won by 9 wickets
Naya Nazimabad Cricket Ground, Karachi

10 December 2025
scorecard

Sui Northern Gas Pipelines Limited; 140 (34.1 overs)	v	Khan Research Laboratories; 40 (20.2 overs)

Sui Northern Gas Pipelines Limited won by 100 runs
United Bank Limited Sports Complex, Karachi

=== Round 3 ===
12 December 2025
scorecard

Pakistan Television; 272/8 (50 overs)	v	Water and Power Development Authority; 235/4 (47 overs)

Pakistan Television won by 6 runs (DLS method)
United Bank Limited Sports Complex, Karachi

12 December 2025
scorecard

Ghani Glass; 327/7 (50 overs)	v	Sahir Associates; 330/2 (36.5 overs)

Sahir Associates won by 8 wickets
HPC Oval Ground, Karachi

12 December 2025
scorecard

State Bank of Pakistan; 286/8 (50 overs)	v	Sui Northern Gas Pipelines Limited; 290/7 (50 overs)

Sui Northern Gas Pipelines Limited won by 3 wickets
Karachi City Cricket Association Stadium, Karachi

12 December 2025 (D/N)
scorecard

Oil & Gas Development Company Limited; 253/8 (50 overs)	v	Khan Research Laboratories; 250 (49.4 overs)

Oil & Gas Development Company Limited won by 3 runs
Naya Nazimabad Cricket Ground, Karachi

=== Round 4 ===
14 December 2025
scorecard

State Bank of Pakistan; 162 (40.1 overs)	v	Khan Research Laboratories; 163/1 (33.4 overs)

Khan Research Laboratories won by 9 wickets
Karachi City Cricket Association Stadium, Karachi

14 December 2025
scorecard

Pakistan Television; 207 (49.5 overs)	v	Sahir Associates; 211/5 (46.5 overs)

Sahir Associates won by 5 wickets
Naya Nazimabad Cricket Ground, Karachi

14 December 2025
scorecard

Sui Northern Gas Pipelines Limited; 221 (46.2 overs)	v	Ghani Glass; 225/9 (48.3 overs)

Ghani Glass won by 1 wicket
United Bank Limited Sports Complex, Karachi

14 December 2025
scorecard

Oil & Gas Development Company Limited; 308/8 (50 overs)	v	Water and Power Development Authority; 313/8 (50 overs)

Oil & Gas Development Company Limited won by 67 runs
HPC Oval Ground, Karachi

=== Round 5 ===
16 December 2025 (D/N)
scorecard

Khan Research Laboratories; 283/7 (50 overs)	v	Pakistan Television; 212 (46.1 overs)

Khan Research Laboratories won by 71 runs
Naya Nazimabad Cricket Ground, Karachi

16 December 2025
scorecard

State Bank of Pakistan; 150 (39.3 overs)	v	Ghani Glass; 151/5 (37 overs)

Ghani Glass won by 5 wickets
United Bank Limited Sports Complex, Karachi

16 December 2025
scorecard

Sahir Associates; 309/8 (50 overs)	v	Water and Power Development Authority; 222 (44 overs)

Sahir Associates won by 87 runs
Karachi City Cricket Association Stadium, Karachi

16 December 2025
scorecard

Sui Northern Gas Pipelines Limited; 243/9 (50 overs)	v	Oil & Gas Development Company Limited; 244/5 (46.3 overs)

Oil & Gas Development Company Limited won by 5 wickets
National Stadium, Karachi

=== Round 6 ===
18 December 2025 (D/N)
scorecard

Pakistan Television; 321/9 (50 overs)	v	Sui Northern Gas Pipelines Limited; 300/9 (50 overs)

Pakistan Television won by 21 runs
National Stadium, Karachi

18 December 2025 (D/N)
scorecard

State Bank of Pakistan; 257/9 (50 overs)	v	Water and Power Development Authority; 147 (37 overs)

State Bank of Pakistan won by 110 runs
Naya Nazimabad Cricket Ground, Karachi

18 December 2025
scorecard

Ghani Glass; 200 (40.1 overs)	v	Khan Research Laboratories; 165 (41.2 overs)

Ghani Glass won by 35 runs
Karachi City Cricket Association Stadium, Karachi

18 December 2025
scorecard

Sahir Associates; 278/9 (50 overs)	v	Oil & Gas Development Company Limited; 282/7 (45.3 overs)

Oil & Gas Development Company Limited won by 3 wickets
United Bank Limited Sports Complex, Karachi

=== Round 7 ===
20 December 2025
scorecard

Pakistan Television; 277/9 (50 overs)	v	State Bank of Pakistan; 230 (40.4 overs)

Pakistan Television won by 47 runs
United Bank Limited Sports Complex, Karachi

20 December 2025
scorecard

Ghani Glass; 181 (42.5 overs)	v	Oil & Gas Development Company Limited; 182/0 (23.2 overs)

Oil & Gas Development Company Limited won by 10 wickets
Karachi City Cricket Association Stadium, Karachi

20 December 2025 (D/N)
scorecard

Khan Research Laboratories; 305/5 (50 overs)	v	Water and Power Development Authority; 127 (30.4 overs)

Khan Research Laboratories won by 178 runs
Naya Nazimabad Cricket Ground, Karachi

20 December 2025 (D/N)
scorecard

Sahir Associates; 217 (48.2 overs)	v	Sui Northern Gas Pipelines Limited; 218/3 (35 overs)

Sui Northern Gas Pipelines Limited won by 7 wickets
National Stadium, Karachi

== Knockout stage ==
=== Semi-finals ===
==== 1st Semi-final ====
22 December 2025
14:00 (D/N)
Scorecard

Pakistan Television; 241 (50 overs)	v	Oil & Gas Development Company Limited; 157 (30.5 overs)
Jahandad Khan 63 (47); Mohammad Imran 3/47 (10 overs); Adil Amin 3/47 (10 overs)		Maaz Sadaqat 35 (16); Ali Usman 2/15 (5 overs)

Pakistan Television won by 84 runs
National Stadium, Karachi
Umpires: Imran Javed and Tariq Rasheed
Player of the match: Jahandad Khan (Pakistan Television)

- Oil & Gas Development Company Limited won the toss and elected to field.

==== 2nd Semi-final ====
23 December 2025
14:00 (D/N)
Scorecard

Khan Research Laboratories; 255 (49.4 overs)	v	Sui Northern Gas Pipelines Limited; 242 (48.2 overs)
Waqar Ahmed 94 (115); Mohammad Salman 6/42 (10 overs)		Saad Khan 66 (81); Arshad Iqbal 5/43 (10 overs)

Khan Research Laboratories won by 13 runs
National Stadium, Karachi
Umpires: Faisal Afridi and Abdul Muqeet
Player of the match: Arshad Iqbal (Khan Research Laboratories)

- Sui Northern Gas Pipelines Limited won the toss and elected to field.
- Mohammad Salman (Sui Northern Gas Pipelines Limited) took his maiden five-wicket haul in List A cricket.

=== Final ===
25 December 2025
14:00 (D/N)
Scorecard

Pakistan Television; 164 (40.2 overs)	v	Khan Research Laboratories; 165/6 (34.4 overs)
Shamyl Hussain 50 (44); Sufiyan Muqeem 3/23 (6.2 overs)		Shahzaib Khan 53 (83); Faisal Akram 3/51 (10 overs)

Khan Research Laboratories won by 4 wickets
National Stadium, Karachi
Umpires: Faisal Afridi and Nasir Hussain
Player of the match: Shahzaib Khan (Khan Research Laboratories)

- Pakistan Television won the toss and elected to bat.
