= 2023–24 President's Trophy Grade-I =

Cricket tournament

- Dates: 16 December 2023 – 13 February 2024
- Administrator: Pakistan Cricket Board
- Cricket format: First-class
- Tournament format(s): Round robin and final
- Host: Pakistan
- Champions: Sui Northern Gas Pipelines Limited (3rd title)
- Runners-up: Water and Power Development Authority
- Participants: 7
- Matches: 22
- Player of the series: Abdul Faseeh (KRL); Mohammad Rameez (GHG)
- Most runs: Abdul Faseeh (KRL) (637)
- Most wickets: Mohammad Rameez (GHG) (42)

The 2023–24 President's Trophy Grade-I was a first-class domestic cricket competition played in Pakistan. The tournament was originally scheduled to be played from 16 December 2023 to 31 January 2024, however, the final was later rescheduled to begin on 6 February 2024. The final was rescheduled a second time to 9 February and moved from Karachi to Rawalpindi. It was played by seven departmental teams, across three venues in Karachi and one venue in Rawalpindi. In December 2023, the Pakistan Cricket Board (PCB) confirmed the fixtures for the tournament. It marked the return of departmental cricket in Pakistan since the 2018–19 season. Although eight teams were originally scheduled to participate, Sui Southern Gas Company pulled out of the tournament.

== Teams ==
Seven teams took part in the tournament:

- Sui Northern Gas Pipelines Limited
- Pakistan Television
- State Bank of Pakistan
- Water and Power Development Authority
- Khan Research Laboratories
- Higher Education Commission
- Ghani Glass

== Competition format ==
The seven departmental teams played each other in a round-robin format, therefore playing six matches each. The tournament consisted of 22 matches, which were divided as seven rounds of league stage matches. The top two teams played each other in the final match. The league worked on a points system with positions being based on the total points.

Before the start of the tournament, the PCB brought some changes to the playing conditions. All matches were restricted to 80 overs in the first innings. Teams scoring 350 or more runs earned a batting bonus point, while a bonus point was awarded to the bowling side if they managed to dismiss the opponent within the stipulated 80 overs. If a captain decided to either declare or forfeit his team's first innings before the completion of 80 overs, the bowling side got bowling bonus points.

== Squads ==
Pakistan Television	SNGPL	Ghani Glass	Higher Education Commission	Khan Research Laboratories	WAPDA	State Bank of Pakistan
Uzair Mumtaz (c); Humayun Altaf; Muhammad Shahzad; Mohammad Suleman; Hassan Nawaz; Nasir Nawaz; Taimur Khan; Waqar Hussain; Mohammad Junaid; Faisal Akram; Aaliyan Mehmood; Ahmad Safi Abdullah; Daniyal Hussain; Adil Naz; Ibtisam Rehman; Sudais Ulfat; Israr Hussain; Jahandad Khan; Hassan Mohsin; Mohammad Sadaqat	Sahibzada Farhan (c); Shahzaib Khan; Saim Ayub; Azhar Ali; Asad Shafiq; Saud Shakeel; Omair Yousuf; Mubasir Khan; Ali Waqas; Mohammad Rizwan; Haseebullah Khan; Abbas Afridi; Mir Hamza; Mohammad Ali; Mohammad Waseem; Bilawal Bhatti; Awais Anwar; Hunain Shah; Yasir Shah; Mehran Mumtaz	Shan Masood (c); Sharjeel Khan; Kashif Ali; Tayyab Tahir; Mohsin Raza; Farhan Sarfraz; Hussain Talat; Shadab Khan; Saeed Malik; Noman Ali; Mohammad Irfan; Shahbaz Javed; Saad Nasim; Sheraz Khan; Muhammad Musa; Moeez Ghani; Niaz Khan; Ghulam Mudassar; Ahad Malik; Ghulam Haider	Mohammad Huraira (c); Saad Khan; Anas Mustafa; Jahanzaib Sultan; Waseem Akram; Awais Zafar; Muhammad Mohsin Khan; Wahaj Riaz; Obaid Shahid; Ghazi Ghouri; Zaid Bin Nadeem; Aqib Liaquat; Haris Khan; Muhammad Juanid; Umer Lohya; Mohammad Azab; Abdul Rehman; Asadullah Hamza; Kashif Ali	Abdul Faseeh (c); Ali Zaryab; Imran Dogar; Imran Rafiq; Sarmad Bhatti; Sharoon Siraj; Waqar Ahmad; Israrullah; Maaz Sadaqat; Kashif Ali; Ahmed Bashir; Sirajuddin; Mohammad Imran; Mohammad Amir Khan; Arshadullah; Rohail Nazir; Jamal Anwar; Rohan Qadri; Umer Khan; Shayan Sheikh	Mohammad Saad (c); Bismillah Khan; Ayaz Tasawar; Umar Kiyani; Khalid Usman; Tahir Hussain; Irfanullah Shah; Ahmad Shahzad; Iftikhar Ahmed; Mohammad Saleem; Umar Akmal; Basit Ali; Naqeeb Masood; Mohammad Naveed; Mohammad Arif; Hassan Abid; Ali Raza; Ahmed Khan; Asif Afridi; Muhammad Akhlaq	Usman Salahuddin (c); Umar Amin; Salman Ali Agha; Zain Abbas; Rizwan Hussain; Mohammad Mohsin; Rameez Aziz; Irfan Khan; Ali Shan; Ameer Hamza; Nisar Ahmad; Kashif Bhatti; Mohammad Imran; Sameen Gul; Zahid Mahmood; Mohammad Ilyas; Ali Usman; Aftab Ibrahim; Mohammad Abbas; Affaq Afridi

== Venues ==
Karachi			Rawalpindi
National Stadium	State Bank of Pakistan Sports Complex	United Bank Limited Sports Complex	Rawalpindi Cricket Stadium
Capacity: 34,000	Capacity: 1000	Capacity: 1000	Capacity: 15,000
Matches: 7	Matches: 7	Matches: 7	Matches: 1
2023–24 President's Trophy Grade-I is located in Pakistan

== League stage ==
=== Points table ===
Pos	Team	Pld	W	L	D	T	NR	Pts	NRR
1	Water and Power Development Authority	6	5	1	0	0	0	62	0.329
2	Sui Northern Gas Pipelines Limited	6	4	1	1	0	0	57	0.630
3	State Bank of Pakistan	6	4	2	0	0	0	50	0.481
4	Ghani Glass	6	3	2	1	0	0	44	-0.406
5	Khan Research Laboratories	6	2	4	0	0	0	27	-0.500
6	Pakistan Television	6	2	4	0	0	0	24	-0.119
7	Higher Education Commission	6	0	6	0	0	0	6	-0.495
Source: ESPNcricinfo

- The top 2 teams qualified for the Final

=== Round 1 ===
16–19 December 2023
Scorecard

Sui Northern Gas Pipelines Limited	v	Ghani Glass
371/7 (80 overs); Abid Ali 90 (163); Mohammad Rameez 6/130 (24 overs)		253 (75.2 overs); Tayyab Tahir 75 (126); Mehran Mumtaz 3/88 (21 overs)
290/7d (67.3 overs); Azhar Ali 109 (144); Mohammad Rameez 3/97 (20.3 overs)		300/6 (96 overs); Saad Nasim 105* (173); Mohammad Ali 4/86 (25 overs)

Match drawn
National Stadium, Karachi
Umpires: Aaley Haider and Ghulam Sarwar

- Sui Northern Gas Pipelines Limited won the toss and elected to bat.
- Ahad Malik, Moeez Ghani and Shahbaz Javed (Ghani Glass) made his first-class debut.

16–19 December 2023
Scorecard

Pakistan Television	v	State Bank of Pakistan
66 (26.2 overs); Uzair Mumtaz 21 (59); Mohammad Abbas 6/19 (11 overs)		358/7 (80 overs); Zain Abbas 126 (177); Mohammad Sadaqat 3/85 (17 overs)
339 (81.3 overs); Hassan Mohsin 96 (145); Mohammad Abbas 4/103 (22.3 overs)		48/0 (6.1 overs); Rizwan Hussain 24* (21)

State Bank of Pakistan won by 10 wickets
State Bank of Pakistan Sports Complex, Karachi
Umpires: Imranullah Aslam and Saqib Khan

- Pakistan Television won the toss and elected to bat.
- Adil Naz, Hasan Nawaz and Uzair Mumtaz (PTV) all made their first-class debuts.

16–19 December 2023
Scorecard

Water and Power Development Authority	v	Khan Research Laboratories
322/6 (80 overs); Iftikhar Ahmed 155 (180); Mohammad Imran 3/75 (18 overs)		274/8 (80 overs); Maaz Sadaqat 52* (121); Asif Afridi 4/81 (31 overs)
238 (90.2 overs); Iftikhar Ahmed 88 (177); Shayan Sheikh 3/55 (24 overs)		238 (71.3 overs); Sarmad Bhatti 60 (152); Asif Afridi 4/64 (25.3 overs)

Water and Power Development Authority won by 48 runs
United Bank Limited Sports Complex, Karachi
Umpires: Farooq Ali Khan and Majid Hussain

- Khan Research Laboratories won the toss and elected to field.
- Hassan Abid, Naqeeb Masood (WAPDA) and Kashif Ali (KRL) all made their first-class debuts.

=== Round 2 ===
22–24 December 2023
Scorecard

Ghani Glass	v	Khan Research Laboratories
363/7 (80 overs); Saeed Malik 105* (123); Kashif Ali 3/61 (22 overs)		320/8 (80 overs); Maaz Sadaqat 84* (137); Niaz Khan 4/107 (18.3 overs)
79 (26.2 overs); Kashif Ali 19 (26); Sirajuddin 4/7 (5.2 overs)		123/9 (35.2 overs); Kashif Ali 30* (40); Ghulam Mudassar 4/32 (8 overs)

Khan Research Laboratories won by 1 wicket
State Bank of Pakistan Sports Complex, Karachi
Umpires: Ghulam Sarwar and Majid Hussain

- Khan Research Laboratories won the toss and elected to field.
- Mohsin Riaz and Saeed Malik (Ghani Glass) both made their first-class debuts.

22–25 December 2023
Scorecard

Higher Education Commission	v	Water and Power Development Authority
327/7 (80 overs); Awaiz Zafar 178* (210); Iftikhar Ahmed 3/88 (28 overs)		391/4 (80 overs); Iftikhar Ahmed 123 (124); Aqib Liaqat 2/124 (22 overs)
283 (67 overs); Ghazi Ghouri 110 (118); Irfanullah Shah 3/39 (9 overs)		221/6 (79.2 overs); Umar Akmal 85 (203); Mohammad Junaid 3/81 (31.4 overs)

Water and Power Development Authority won by 4 wickets
National Stadium, Karachi
Umpires: Aleem Dar and Farooq Ali Khan

- Higher Education Commission won the toss and elected to bat.
- Aqib Liaquat, Abdul Rehman, Jahanzaib Sultan, Mohammad Azab and Mohammad Junaid (HEC) all made their first-class debuts.

22–25 December 2023
Scorecard

Pakistan Television	v	Sui Northern Gas Pipelines Limited
317 (79.2 overs); Uzair Mumtaz 108 (130); Arif Yaqoob 4/97 (23 overs)		424/7 (80 overs); Abid Ali 121 (180); Adil Naz 3/83 (20 overs)
189 (49.1 overs); Hasan Nawaz 69 (92); Arif Yaqoob 6/80 (16 overs)		85/2 (21 overs); Sahibzada Farhan 51 (61); Faisal Akram 1/19 (5 overs)

Sui Northern Gas Pipelines Limited won by 8 wickets
United Bank Limited Sports Complex, Karachi
Umpires: Imranullah Aslam and Saqib Khan

- Pakistan Television won the toss and elected to bat.
- Arif Yaqoob (SNGCP) and Faisal Akram (PTV) both made their first-class debuts.

=== Round 3 ===
28–31 December 2023
Scorecard`

Sui Northern Gas Pipelines Limited	v	State Bank of Pakistan
170 (59.1 overs); Umar Amin 48 (97); Shahnawaz Dahani 6/40 (12 overs)		305/8 (80 overs); Mubasir Khan 84 (114); Mohammad Ilyas 4/77 (17 overs)
257 (89.4 overs); Rameez Aziz 80 (208); Awais Anwar 3/29 (17.4 overs)		127/4 (46 overs); Asad Shafiq 47* (71); Mohammad Abbas 2/32 (17 overs)

Sui Northern Gas Pipelines Limited won by 6 wickets
State Bank of Pakistan Sports Complex, Karachi
Umpires: Rashid Riaz and Nasir Hussain

- Sui Northern Gas Pipelines Limited won the toss and elected to field.

28–31 December 2023
Scorecard

Ghani Glass	v	Pakistan Television
319/9 (80 overs); Saad Nasim 150 (198); Mohammad Sadaqat 3/72 (16 overs)		128 (36.2 overs); Taimur Khan 50 (63); Mohammad Rameez 4/25 (9.2 overs)
219/3 (50.1 overs); Sharjeel Khan 109 (120); Mohammad Sadaqat 2/73 (14 overs)		409 (96.4 overs) (f/o); Taimur Khan 160 (200); Mohammad Rameez 5/146 (32.4 overs)

Ghani Glass won by 7 wickets
National Stadium, Karachi
Umpires: Aleem Dar and Zulfiqar Jan

- Pakistan Television won the toss and elected to field.

28–31 December 2023
Scorecard

Khan Research Laboratories	v	Higher Education Commission
411/7 (80 overs); Abdul Faseeh 153 (171); Mohammad Azab 3/103 (18 overs)		379/8 (80 overs); Awaiz Zafar 111 (172); Arshadullah 4/77 (19 overs)
401/9d (79 overs); Abdul Faseeh 156 (179); Adeel Meo 2/35 (6 overs)		313 (73.2 overs); Saad Khan 68 (111); Rohan Qadri 4/46 (13.2 overs)

Khan Research Laboratories won by 120 runs
United Bank Limited Sports Complex, Karachi
Umpires: Asif Yaqoob and Faisal Afridi

- Higher Education Commission won the toss and elected to field.

=== Round 4 ===
3–6 January 2024
Scorecard

Khan Research Laboratories	v	Sui Northern Gas Pipelines Limited
281/9 (80 overs); Imran Rafiq 53 (86); Arif Yaqoob 4/83 (19 overs)		349/7 (80 overs); Azhar Ali 140* (206); Maaz Sadaqat 3/83 (23 overs)
299 (102.2 overs); Imran Rafiq 78 (160); Mubasir Khan 4/35 (22.2 overs)		235/2 (54.4 overs); Kamran Ghulam 101* (124); Maaz Sadaqat 1/37 (16 overs)

Sui Northern Gas Pipelines Limited won by 8 wickets
National Stadium, Karachi
Umpires: Tariq Rasheed and Imran Jawed

- Khan Research Laboratories won the toss and elected to bat.
- Azan Tariq (KRL) made his first-class debut.
- Azhar Ali scored his 50th century in first-class cricket.

3–6 January 2024
Scorecard

Ghani Glass	v	Higher Education Commission
221 (67.5 overs); Tayyab Tahir 103 (170); Wahaj Riaz 4/39 (13 overs)		189 (38.5 overs); Ghazi Ghouri 66 (77); Mohammad Rameez 5/60 (11.5 overs)
446/8d (100.3 overs); Saeed Ali 118 (181); Waseem Akram 2/83 (23 overs)		317 (67 overs); Saad Khan 104 (133); Mohammad Rameez 5/81 (18 overs)

Ghani Glass won by 161 runs
United Bank Limited Sports Complex, Karachi
Umpires: Asif Yaqoob and Zulfiqar Jan

- Ghani Glass won the toss and elected to bat.
- Asadullah Hamza, Haris Khan and Wahaj Riaz (HEC) all made their first-class debuts.

3–6 January 2024
Scorecard

Water and Power Development Authority	v	State Bank of Pakistan
140 (43.1 overs); Umar Kiyani 32 (58); Nisar Ahmad 5/30 (9 overs)		222 (66.5 overs); Rameez Aziz 71 (127); Akif Javed 4/69 (17 overs)
122 (42.2 overs); Mohammad Saad 39 (73); Afaq Afridi 6/38 (12 overs)		43/1 (7.1 overs); Zain Abbas 18 (16); Irfanullah Shah 1/16 (3.1 overs)

State Bank of Pakistan won by 9 wickets
State Bank of Pakistan Sports Complex, Karachi
Umpires: Nasir Hussain and Kashif Sohail

- State Bank of Pakistan won the toss and elected to field.
- Afaq Afridi (SBP) made his first-class debut.

=== Round 5 ===
9–12 January 2024
Scorecard

Water and Power Development Authority	v	Sui Northern Gas Pipelines Limited
328/6 (80 overs); Ahmed Shehzad 77 (111); Mubasir Khan 3/67 (19 overs)		292 (73.3 overs); Abid Ali 147 (183); Asif Afridi 5/124 (34.3 overs)
330/5d (98 overs); Umar Akmal 128 (210); Shehzad Gul 1/33 (13 overs)		222 (95.5 overs); Asad Shafiq 92* (197); Khalid Usman 5/64 (26.5 overs)

Water and Power Development Authority won by 144 runs
United Bank Limited Sports Complex, Karachi
Umpires: Aaley Haider and Qaiser Khan

- Sui Northern Gas Pipelines Limited won the toss and elected to field.
- Ahmed Khan (SNGCP) and Shehzad Gul (WAPDA) both made their first-class debuts.

9–12 January 2024
Scorecard

Pakistan Television	v	Higher Education Commission
216 (52 overs); Hasan Mohsin 56 (68); Asadullah Hamza 4/61 (16 overs)		231/8 (80 overs); Obaid Shahid 57* (149); Mohammad Ibtisam 2/52 (18 overs)
421 (102.4 overs); Waqar Hussain 104 (172); Aarish Ali Khan 3/118 (34.4 overs)		197 (46.4 overs); Mohammad Huraira 63 (90); Jahandad Khan 7/65 (19.4 overs)

Pakistan Television won by 209 runs
State Bank of Pakistan Sports Complex, Karachi
Umpires: Abdul Muqeet and Kashif Sohail

- Higher Education Commission won the toss and elected to field.
- Mohammad Ibtisam, Muhammad Shahzad (PTV) and Muneer Khan, Obaid Shahid (HEC) all made their first-class debuts.

9–12 January 2024
Scorecard

Khan Research Laboratories	v	State Bank of Pakistan
269 (78.3 overs); Rohail Nazir 66 (110); Rameez Aziz 3/67 (17 overs)		194 (58.3 overs); Irfan Khan 91* (124); Umer Khan 3/41 (21 overs)
169 (58.2 overs); Maaz Sadaqat 51 (101); Afaq Afridi 4/31 (15 overs)		248/6 (60 overs); Irfan Khan 101* (180); Kashif Ali 3/42 (11 overs)

State Bank of Pakistan won by 4 wickets
National Stadium, Karachi
Umpires: Tariq Rasheed and Aslam Bareach

- State Bank of Pakistan won the toss and elected to field.

=== Round 6 ===
15–18 January 2024
Scorecard

Water and Power Development Authority	v	Ghani Glass
212 (60.1 overs); Ayaz Tasawwar 81 (115); Shoaib Akhtar 5/71 (24.1 overs)		60 (25.5 overs); Mohsin Riaz 18 (33); Ali Shafique 7/14 (10.5 overs)
366/4d (70.1 overs); Muhammad Akhlaq 202* (199); Tayyab Tahir 1/39 (7 overs)		224 (57.1 overs); Saeed Ali 60 (58); Asif Afridi 5/55 (20 overs)

Water and Power Development Authority won by 294 runs
State Bank of Pakistan Sports Complex, Karachi
Umpires: Shozab Raza and Qaiser Khan

- Ghani Glass won the toss and elected to field.

15–18 January 2024
Scorecard

Pakistan Television	v	Khan Research Laboratories
360/8 (80 overs); Mohammad Suleman 101 (200); Ahmed Bashir 3/103 (21 overs)		271 (71.1 overs); Imran Rafiq 79 (138); Mohammad Ibtisam 4/68 (15 overs)
336/7d (76.1 overs); Mohammad Suleman 133* (182); Maaz Sadaqat 5/80 (21 overs)		270 (61.1 overs); Abdul Faseeh 103 (142); Faisal Akram 4/87 (18.1 overs)

Pakistan Television won by 155 runs
United Bank Limited Sports Complex, Karachi
Umpires: Imtiaz Iqbal and Abdul Muqeet

- Pakistan Television won the toss and elected to bat.

15–18 January 2024
Scorecard

Higher Education Commission	v	State Bank of Pakistan
95 (38.4 overs); Mohammad Junaid 27* (55); Salman Ali Agha 5/39 (14 overs)		307/5 (80 overs); Umar Amin 158 (224); Mohammad Junaid 3/127 (32 overs)
235 (73.4 overs); Saad Khan 88 (163); Kashif Bhatti 3/28 (18.4 overs)		24/0 (15.3 overs); Mohammad Mohsin 14* (18)

State Bank of Pakistan won by 10 wickets
National Stadium, Karachi
Umpires: Mohammad Asif and Aslam Bareach

- Higher Education Commission won the toss and elected to bat.
- Haider Abbas, Hasan Liaquat and Syed Tayyab Hussain (HEC) all made their first-class debuts.

=== Round 7 ===
21–24 January 2024
Scorecard

Sui Northern Gas Pipelines Limited	v	Higher Education Commission
279 (77.4 overs); Saud Shakeel 102 (154); Waseem Akram 4/50 (21.4 overs)		257 (72 overs); Saad Khan 91 (115); Mir Hamza 4/53 (21 overs)
351/5d (78 overs); Kamran Ghulam 104 (140); Asif Ali 2/79 (21 overs)		264 (76.1 overs); Saad Khan 65 (149); Shahnawaz Dahani 5/54 (15 overs)

Sui Northern Gas Pipelines Limited won by 109 runs
State Bank of Pakistan Sports Complex, Karachi
Umpires: Shozab Raza and Waleed Yaqub

- Higher Education Commission won the toss and elected to field.
- Asif Ali, Sohaib Sultan and Umar Lohya (HEC) all made their first-class debuts.
- Kamran Ghulam scored his 15th century in first-class cricket.

21–24 January 2024
Scorecard

State Bank of Pakistan	v	Ghani Glass
278 (70.4 overs); Umar Amin 69 (72); Mohammad Rameez 4/122 (25.4 overs)		282/9 (80 overs); Saad Nasim 53 (67); Kashif Bhatti 5/99 (33 overs)
179 (43.3 overs); Umar Amin 104 (125); Mohammad Rameez 6/59 (14.3 overs)		179/8 (49.1 overs); Saeed Ali 40 (67); Afaq Afridi 3/19 (12 overs)

Ghani Glass won by 2 wickets
United Bank Limited Sports Complex, Karachi
Umpires: Mohammad Sajid and Imran Jawed

- Ghani Glass won the toss and elected to field.
- Ghulam Haider (GHG) made his first-class debut.
- Umar Amin scored his 30th century in first-class cricket.

21–24 January 2024
Scorecard

Pakistan Television	v	Water and Power Development Authority
146 (39.4 overs); Uzair Mumtaz 46 (73); Asif Afridi 5/67 (18.4 overs)		124 (34.1 overs); Ahmed Shehzad 30 (57); Faisal Akram 7/47 (11.1 overs)
202 (57 overs); Muhammad Shahzad 53 (84); Asif Afridi 4/87 (28 overs)		227/7 (41 overs); Muhammad Akhlaq 100 (97); Mohammad Junaid 3/82 (16 overs)

Water and Power Development Authority won by 3 wickets
National Stadium, Karachi
Umpires: Muhammad Asif and Imtiaz Iqbal

- Pakistan Television won the toss and elected to bat first.
- Mohammad Arif (WAPDA) made his first-class debut.

== Final ==
9–13 February 2024
Scorecard

Sui Northern Gas Pipelines Limited	v	Water and Power Development Authority
479/7 (80 overs); Sahibzada Farhan 161 (206); Tahir Hussain 2/78 (12 overs)		140 (34.4 overs); Iftikhar Ahmed 52 (59); Shahnawaz Dahani 7/42 (12.4 overs)
346/8d (82 overs); Bilawal Bhatti 101 (114); Asif Afridi 5/149 (35 overs)		166 (32 overs); Ayaz Tasawwar 51 (30); Mir Hamza 3/50 (9 overs)

Sui Northern Gas Pipelines Limited won by 519 runs
Rawalpindi Cricket Stadium, Rawalpindi
Umpires: Mohammad Sajid and Waleed Yaqub
Player of the match: Sahibzada Farhan and Shahnawaz Dahani (Sui Northern Gas Pipelines Limited)

- Water and Power Development Authority won the toss and elected to field.

== Awards and statistics ==
=== Most runs ===
Player	Team	Runs
Abdul Faseeh	Khan Research Laboratories	637
Saad Nasim	Ghani Glass	595
Abid Ali	Sui Northern Gas Pipelines Limited	570
Umar Amin	State Bank of Pakistan	547
Saad Khan	Higher Education Commission	529

- Source: ESPNcricinfo

=== Most wickets ===
Player	Team	Wickets
Mohammad Rameez	Ghani Glass	42
Asif Afridi	Water and Power Development Authority	37
Shahnawaz Dahani	Sui Northern Gas Pipelines Limited	25
Shoaib Akhtar	Ghani Glass	23
Faisal Akram	Pakistan Television	20

- Source: ESPNcricinfo

=== End of season awards ===
Name	Team	Award	Prize
Abdul Faseeh	Khan Research Laboratories	Player of the Tournament	Rs. 100,000 (US$360)
Mohammad Rameez	Ghani Glass	Player of the Tournament	Rs. 100,000 (US$360)
Abdul Faseeh	Khan Research Laboratories	Batsman of the tournament	Rs. 100,000 (US$360)
Mohammad Rameez	Ghani Glass	Bowler of the tournament	Rs. 100,000 (US$360)
Shahbaz Javed	Ghani Glass	Wicket-keeper of the tournament	Rs. 100,000 (US$360)

- Source: PCB
