= 2026–27 President's Trophy Grade-I =

Cricket tournament

- Dates: 12 September 2026 – 30 October 2026
- Administrator: Pakistan Cricket Board
- Cricket format: First-class (4-day)
- Tournament format(s): Single round robin and final
- Champions: Markhor IT Solutions (1st title)
- Runners-up: State Bank of Pakistan
- Participants: 8
- Matches: 29
- Most runs: Hasan Raza (807)
- Most wickets: Mohammad Amir Khan (32); Sirajuddin (32); Muhammad Ismail (32)

The 2026–27 President's Trophy Grade-I was a first-class domestic cricket competition in Pakistan, played from September to October 2026. This edition of the President's Trophy was contested by eight departmental teams across five venues in Abbottabad, Islamabad, Peshawar, Rawalpindi and Lahore. In September 2026, the Pakistan Cricket Board (PCB) confirmed the fixtures for the tournament.

Water and Power Development Authority were the defending champions having won the previous tournament by beating Sui Northern Gas Pipelines Limited in the final by 35 runs. Markhor IT Solutions won the tournament, beating State Bank of Pakistan in the final.

== Background ==
On 4 August 2026, The Pakistan Cricket Board (PCB) axed Water and Power Development Authority current first-class champions, and Sahir Associates from the domestic season, after the two departments were unable to comply with the regulations introduced by PCB in June.

== Teams ==
Eight teams competed in the tournament:

- Ghani Glass
- Hyderabad Kingsmen Academy
- Khan Research Laboratories
- Markhor IT Solutions
- Oil & Gas Development Company Limited
- Pakistan Television
- State Bank of Pakistan
- Sui Northern Gas Pipelines Limited

Six of the eight teams that contested the 2025–26 tournament were joined by Kingsmen Academy and Markhor IT Solutions, who were both promoted to Grade-I after being winner and runner-up respectively of 2026–27 President's Trophy Grade-II (Gold) in June 2026.

== Competition format ==
As in the previous season the eight departmental teams played each other in a round-robin format, therefore playing seven matches each. There were 29 matches: seven rounds of four matches each, followed by a final between the top two teams.

== Points table ==
Pos	Team	Pld	W	L	D	Pts	Qualification
1	State Bank of Pakistan	7	2	0	5	107	Advanced to the final
2	Markhor IT Solutions	7	2	1	4	96	Advanced to the final
3	Ghani Glass	7	2	2	3	90	
4	Hyderabad Kingsmen Academy	7	1	1	5	88	
5	Khan Research Laboratories	7	1	1	5	83	
6	Sui Northern Gas Pipelines Limited	7	1	1	5	76	
7	Pakistan Television	7	1	3	3	75	Relegation to President's Trophy Grade-II
8	Oil & Gas Development Company Limited	7	1	2	4	73	Relegation to President's Trophy Grade-II

Source: Cricinfo

== Round-robin ==
=== Round 1 ===
12–15 September 2026
Scorecard

Khan Research Laboratories; 547/9d (122.4 overs) & 215/2d (29 overs)	v	Ghani Glass; 306 (81.5 overs) & 207/4 (60 overs)

Match drawn
Imran Khan Cricket Stadium, Peshawar
Points: Khan Research Laboratories 13, Ghani Glass 7

12–15 September 2026
Scorecard

Hyderabad Kingsmen Academy; 565/7d (131.1 overs) & 45/3 (9 overs)	v	Markhor IT Solutions; 330 (76.5 overs) & 384 (86.2 overs) (f/o)

Match drawn
Abbottabad Cricket Stadium, Abbottabad
Points: Hyderabad Kingsmen Academy 12, Markhor IT Solutions 8

12–15 September 2026
Scorecard

Pakistan Television; 400 (106.1 overs)	v	Oil & Gas Development Company Limited; 204 (64 overs) & 64/3 (19 overs) (f/o)

Match drawn
Diamond Club Ground, Islamabad
Points: Pakistan Television 14, Oil & Gas Development Company Limited 8

12–15 September 2026
Scorecard

State Bank of Pakistan; 158 (62.2 overs) & 190/1 (58 overs)	v	Sui Northern Gas Pipelines Limited; 188 (68.1 overs)

Match drawn
Shoaib Akhtar Cricket Stadium, Rawalpindi
Points: State Bank of Pakistan 12, Sui Northern Gas Pipelines Limited 12

=== Round 2 ===
18–21 September 2026
Scorecard

Sui Northern Gas Pipelines Limited; 152 (41.5 overs) & 243 (60.4 overs)	v	Ghani Glass; 409 (103 overs)

Ghani Glass won by an innings and 14 runs
Diamond Club Ground, Islamabad
Points: Ghani Glass 28, Sui Northern Gas Pipelines Limited 4

18–21 September 2026
Scorecard

Markhor IT Solutions; 660 (126.1 overs) & 167/9 (50 overs)	v	Khan Research Laboratories; 490 (158 overs)

Match drawn
Shoaib Akhtar Cricket Stadium, Rawalpindi
Points: Markhor IT Solutions 10, Khan Research Laboratories 8

18–21 September 2026
Scorecard

State Bank of Pakistan; 433 (95.1 overs) & 328/8d (83 overs)	v	Pakistan Television; 469 (122.3 overs) & 64/1 (12 overs)

Match drawn
Abbottabad Cricket Stadium, Abbottabad
Points: Pakistan Television 12, State Bank of Pakistan 10

18–21 September 2026
Scorecard

Hyderabad Kingsmen Academy; 215 (57.3 overs) & 203 (61.5 overs)	v	Oil & Gas Development Company Limited; 298 (89 overs) & 121/1 (28.1 overs)

Oil & Gas Development Company Limited won by 9 wickets
Imran Khan Cricket Stadium, Peshawar
Points: Oil & Gas Development Company Limited 23, Hyderabad Kingsmen Academy 5

=== Round 3 ===
24–27 September 2026
Scorecard

Ghani Glass; 322 (84.1 overs) & 298 (95.5 overs)	v	State Bank of Pakistan; 638/5d (115 overs)

State Bank of Pakistan won by an innings and 18 runs
Shoaib Akhtar Cricket Stadium, Rawalpindi
Points: State Bank of Pakistan 27, Ghani Glass 2

24–27 September 2026
Scorecard

Khan Research Laboratories; 398 (117.3 overs) & 275 (89 overs)	v	Oil & Gas Development Company Limited; 217 (63.1 overs) & 11/1 (3 overs)

Match drawn
Abbottabad Cricket Stadium, Abbottabad
Points: Khan Research Laboratories 14, Oil & Gas Development Company Limited 8

24–27 September 2026
Scorecard

Markhor IT Solutions; 434/9d (126.5 overs) & 192/7d (45.3 overs)	v	Sui Northern Gas Pipelines Limited; 233 (89.3 overs) & 163/1 (50 overs)

Match drawn
Imran Khan Cricket Stadium, Peshawar
Points: Markhor IT Solutions 13, Sui Northern Gas Pipelines Limited 5

24–27 September 2026
Scorecard

Pakistan Television; 355 (73.3 overs) & 299 (88.2 overs)	v	Hyderabad Kingsmen Academy; 568/8d (132.3 overs) & 87/0 (9.5 overs)

Hyderabad Kingsmen Academy won by 10 wickets
Diamond Club Ground, Islamabad
Points: Hyderabad Kingsmen Academy 24, Pakistan Television 3

=== Round 4 ===
30 September–3 October 2026
Scorecard

Markhor IT Solutions; 150 (32.1 overs) & 126 (32.4 overs)	v	Ghani Glass; 416 (100.4 overs)

Ghani Glass won by an innings and 140 runs
Abbottabad Cricket Stadium, Abbottabad
Points: Ghani Glass 29, Markhor IT Solutions 3

30 September–3 October 2026
Scorecard

Hyderabad Kingsmen Academy; 643/8d (127 overs) & 167/3d (24.5 overs)	v	Khan Research Laboratories; 344 (91 overs) & 236/4 (76 overs)

Match drawn
National Stadium, Karachi
Points: Hyderabad Kingsmen Academy 14, Khan Research Laboratories 7

30 September–3 October 2026
Scorecard

Sui Northern Gas Pipelines Limited; 347 (104.4 overs) & 86/3 (23 overs)	v	Pakistan Television; 153 (42.4 overs) & 400/7d (124 overs) (f/o)

Match drawn
Imran Khan Cricket Stadium, Peshawar
Points: Sui Northern Gas Pipelines Limited 14, Pakistan Television 8

30 September–3 October 2026
Scorecard

Oil & Gas Development Company Limited; 196 (50 overs) & 142 (29.2 overs)	v	State Bank of Pakistan; 215 (67.1 overs) & 127/6 (27.5 overs)

State Bank of Pakistan won by 4 wickets
Diamond Club Ground, Islamabad
Points: State Bank of Pakistan 23, Oil & Gas Development Company Limited 6

=== Round 5 ===
6–9 October 2026
Scorecard

Ghani Glass; 102 (32.5 overs) & 337 (113.5 overs)	v	Pakistan Television; 428 (93 overs) & 15/0 (1.2 overs)

Pakistan Television won by 10 wickets
Abbottabad Cricket Stadium, Abbottabad
Points: Pakistan Television 27, Ghani Glass 4

6–9 October 2026
Scorecard

Khan Research Laboratories; 144 (54.1 overs) & 257/4d (49 overs)	v	State Bank of Pakistan; 56 (21.2 overs) & 145/5 (53 overs)

Match drawn
Imran Khan Cricket Stadium, Peshawar
Points: Khan Research Laboratories 12, State Bank of Pakistan 12

6–9 October 2026
Scorecard

Markhor IT Solutions; 223 (63 overs) & 190 (54.2 overs)	v	Oil & Gas Development Company Limited; 193 (63.4 overs) & 145 (32.5 overs)

Markhor IT Solutions won by 75 runs
Shoaib Akhtar Cricket Stadium, Rawalpindi
Points: Markhor IT Solutions 23, Oil & Gas Development Company Limited 6

6–9 October 2026
Scorecard

Hyderabad Kingsmen Academy; 217 (50.5 overs) & 440 (110.2 overs)	v	Sui Northern Gas Pipelines Limited; 234 (67.1 overs) & 15/0 (5 overs)

Match drawn
Diamond Club Ground, Islamabad
Points: Hyderabad Kingsmen Academy 11, Sui Northern Gas Pipelines Limited 11

=== Round 6 ===
14–17 October 2026 (Note: This match was originally scheduled for 12–15 October before being rescheduled after the Pakistan federal government declared a state of emergency and imposed governor's rule in the Khyber Pakhtunkhwa province.)
Scorecard

Ghani Glass; 417/8d (107.5 overs) & 8/1 (3 overs)	v	Hyderabad Kingsmen Academy; 347 (80.2 overs)

Match drawn
Rana Naveed Cricket Academy, Sheikhupura
Points: Ghani 12, Hyderabad Kingsmen Academy 10

12–15 October 2026
Scorecard

Pakistan Television; 220 (49.4 overs) & 132 (38.1 overs)	v	Khan Research Laboratories; 129 (48.2 overs) & 227/4 (41.4 overs)

Khan Research Laboratories won by 6 wickets
Shoaib Akhtar Cricket Stadium, Rawalpindi
Points: Khan Research Laboratories 22, Pakistan Television 7

12–15 October 2026
Scorecard

Markhor IT Solutions; 376 (76.3 overs) & 98/3 (29 overs)	v	State Bank of Pakistan; 344 (97.3 overs)

Match drawn
Diamond Club Ground, Islamabad
Points: Markhor IT Solutions 12, State Bank of Pakistan 11

14–17 October 2026
Scorecard

Oil & Gas Development Company Limited; 351 (108.4 overs) & 123/2 (35 overs)	v	Sui Northern Gas Pipelines Limited; 329 (104.4 overs)

Match drawn
Lahore City Cricket Association Ground, Lahore
Points: Oil & Gas Development Company Limited 7, Sui Northern Gas Pipelines Limited 7

=== Round 7 ===
19–22 October 2026
Scorecard

Ghani Glass; 232 (75.3 overs) & 383/7d (104 overs)	v	Oil & Gas Development Company Limited; 410/9d (102 overs)

Match drawn
Lahore City Cricket Association Ground, Lahore
Points: Oil & Gas Development Company Limited 15, Ghani Glass 8

18–21 October 2026
Scorecard

Khan Research Laboratories; 151 (50 overs) & 234 (69.1 overs)	v	Sui Northern Gas Pipelines Limited; 195 (54 overs) & 193/6 (53.2 overs)

Sui Northern Gas Pipelines Limited won by 4 wickets
Shoaib Akhtar Cricket Stadium, Rawalpindi
Points: Sui Northern Gas Pipelines Limited 23, Khan Research Laboratories 7

18–21 October 2026
Scorecard

Markhor IT Solutions; 412 (88.4 overs) & 50/4 (9.4 overs)	v	Pakistan Television; 64 (19.5 overs) & 394 (110 overs) (f/o)

Markhor IT Solutions won by 6 wickets
Diamond Club Ground, Islamabad
Points: Markhor IT Solutions 27, Pakistan Television 4

18–21 October 2026
Scorecard

Hyderabad Kingsmen Academy; 371 (97 overs) & 321/8d (44 overs)	v	State Bank of Pakistan; 398 (97 overs) & 208/3 (57 overs)

Match drawn
National Ground, Islamabad
Points: Hyderabad Kingsmen Academy 12, State Bank of Pakistan 12

== Final ==
27–31 October 2026
Scorecard

Markhor IT Solutions	v	State Bank of Pakistan
112 (29.5 overs); Atizaz Habib Khan 29 (30); Sirajuddin 6/39 (9 overs)		172 (44.4 overs); Hasan Raza 36 (63); Aamir Jamal 7/32 (14 overs)
296 (74.5 overs); Abuzar Tariq 85 (148); Mohammad Abbas 5/70 (18 overs)		185 (71.5 overs); Hasan Raza 73 (136); Khalid Usman 4/38 (16.5 overs)

Markhor IT Solutions won by 51 runs
Bagh-e-Jinnah, Lahore
Umpires: Faisal Afridi and Zulfiqar Jan
Player of the match: Aamir Jamal (Markhor IT Solutions)

- Markhor IT Solutions won the toss and elected to bat.
- Sirajuddin (State Bank of Pakistan) took his maiden five-wicket haul in first-class cricket.
