= President's Cup Grade-I (1-Day) =

Pakistan cricket competition

- Countries: Pakistan
- Administrator: Pakistan Cricket Board
- Format: Limited overs (List A)
- First edition: 2023–24
- Latest edition: 2025–26
- Number of teams: 7
- Current champion: Khan Research Laboratories (1st title)
- Most successful: Sui Northern Gas Pipelines; State Bank of Pakistan; Khan Research Laboratories (1 title each)
- TV: PTV Sports
- Website: www.pcb.com.pk

The President's Cup Grade-I (1-Day) or simply known as President’s Cup is the national domestic List A cricket competition in Pakistan. It is organized by the Pakistan Cricket Board (PCB) that forms part of the Pakistan domestic cricket season. It consists of teams representing the government and semi-government departments, corporations, commercial organisations, business houses, banks, airlines, and educational institutions.

For the 2023–24 domestic season, a new List-A competition, called the President’s Cup (50-over), was created for departments.

== History ==
The President's Cup Grade-I (1-Day) has most often been contested by all departmental teams, but has been a mixed competition with regional associations and even all associations.

== Teams ==
- Eshaal Associates
- Ghani Glass
- Higher Education Commission
- Khan Research Laboratories
- Oil & Gas Development Company Limited
- Pakistan Television
- State Bank of Pakistan
- Sui Northern Gas Pipelines
- Water and Power Development Authority

== Tournament seasons and results ==
Year	Final			Final venue	Player of the season	References
Year	Winner	Result	Runner-up	Final venue	Player of the season	References
2023–24	Sui Northern Gas Pipelines; 194/2 (26.3 overs)	Sui Northern Gas Pipelines by 8 wickets (Scorecard)	Higher Education Commission; 189 (45.4 overs)	Gaddafi Stadium, Lahore	Abdullah Shafique (Sui Northern Gas Pipelines)	Match Report
2024–25	State Bank of Pakistan; 169/3 (43.4 overs)	State Bank of Pakistan by 7 wickets (Scorecard)	Sui Northern Gas Pipelines; 165 (37.3 overs)	Jinnah Stadium, Gujranwala	Faheem Ashraf (Pakistan Television)	Match Report
2025–26	Khan Research Laboratories; 165/6 (34.4 overs)	Khan Research Laboratories by 6 wickets (Scorecard)	Pakistan Television; 164 (40.2 overs)	National Stadium, Karachi	Iftikhar Ahmed (Khan Research Laboratories)	Match Report
