= 2013–14 President's One Day Cup =

- Dates: 28 October – 1 February
- Administrator: Pakistan Cricket Board
- Cricket format: List A cricket
- Tournament format: Round Robin
- Host: Pakistan
- Champions: National Bank and KRL
- Participants: 11

The President's National One Day Cup 2013–14 is the twenty ninth edition started in 1985-86 is the premier List A cricket domestic competition in Pakistan, which was held from 28 October 2013 to 1 February 2014.

== Venue ==
Venue of teams in 2013–14 President's One Day Cup

== Fixtures and Results ==
All times shown are in Pakistan Standard Time (UTC+05).

=== Group stage ===
Points Table Source:Cricinfo

Team	Pld	W	L	NR	NRR	Pts
NBP	10	7	2	1	+1.540	15
KRL	10	7	2	1	+0.589	15
SNGPL	10	7	2	1	–0.102	15
Port Qasim Authority	10	6	3	1	+0.351	13
ZTBL	10	5	5	0	+0.140	10
State Bank	10	4	5	1	–0.791	9
UBL	10	4	6	0	–0.069	8
PIA	10	4	6	0	–0.360	8
HBL	10	3	6	1	+0.185	7
WAPDA	10	3	7	0	–0.544	6
Pakistan Television	10	2	8	0	–0.841	4
