= Azhar Ali =

Pakistani cricketer

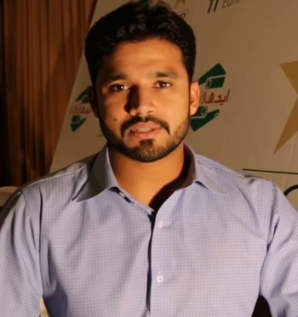
- Azhar Ali in 2017

Personal information
- Born: 19 February 1985 (age 41); Lahore, Punjab, Pakistan
- Nickname: Ajju
- Height: 5 ft 10 in (178 cm)
- Batting: Right-handed
- Bowling: Right arm leg break
- Role: Top-order batter

International information
- National side: Pakistan (2010–2022)
- Test debut (cap 199): 13 July 2010 v Australia
- Last Test: 17 December 2022 v England
- ODI debut (cap 185): 30 May 2011 v Ireland
- Last ODI: 13 January 2018 v New Zealand
- ODI shirt no.: 79

Domestic team information
- Years: Team
- 2006–2010: Khan Research Laboratories
- 2011–2013: Lahore Eagles
- 2014–2015: Lahore Lions
- 2016–2017: Lahore Qalandars
- 2015: Baluchistan
- 2018–2021: Somerset
- 2019–2023: Central Punjab
- 2022–2023: Worcestershire
- 2023/24: Sui Northern Gas Pipelines Limited

Career statistics
Competition	Test	ODI	FC	LA
Matches	97	53	262	181
Runs scored	7,142	1,845	16,327	6,674
Batting average	42.26	36.90	39.05	46.34
100s/50s	19/35	3/12	50/69	18/38
Top score	302*	102	302*	132*
Balls bowled	867	258	3,682	2,538
Wickets	8	4	51	69
Bowling average	77.62	65.00	45.80	33.79
5 wickets in innings	0	0	0	4
10 wickets in match	0	0	0	0
Best bowling	2/49	2/26	4/34	5/23
Catches/stumpings	66/–	8/–	159/–	53/–
Medal record
Men's Cricket
Representing Pakistan
ICC Champions Trophy
Winner	2017 England & Wales
Asia Cup
Winner	2012 Bangladesh
- Source: ESPNcricinfo, 1 October 2023

Azhar Ali (Punjabi:اظہر علی; born 19 February 1985) is a Pakistani former international cricketer. He is former captain of ODI and test team of Pakistan national team. He is a member of the Men's National Selection Committee of the Pakistan Cricket Board.

Ali made his Test debut for Pakistan against Australia in the first Test at Lord's in July 2010. An agile right-hand batter and a part-time leg-break bowler, Ali became the first ever centurion, double Centurion as well as triple centurion in a Day and Night Test Match, when he scored 302 against West Indies in October 2016. He held the record for the highest ever individual score in an innings of a day/night Test match which was later surpassed by David Warner in November 2019 who scored unbeaten 335. Ali was a major contributor to helping his country win the 2017 ICC Champions Trophy, where in the final, he scored 59 runs.

Domestically, he has played for Khan Research Laboratories, Lahore, Lahore Eagles, Lahore Lions, Lahore Qalandars, Pakistan A and Huntly (Scotland) during his career. He was the captain of Lahore Qalandars in the first edition of the Pakistan Super League.

In August 2018, he was one of thirty-three players to be awarded a central contract for the 2018–19 season by the Pakistan Cricket Board (PCB). On 1 November 2018, he announced his retirement from One Day International cricket. On 16 December 2022, he announced that he would retire from Test cricket following the completion of the home Test series against England.

== Personal life ==
His father Muhammad Rafiq is also an athlete, having participated in different marathons, in 2021 winning a gold medal in Sheikhupura's 21 km marathon race at the age of 76.

In December 2020, he launched a cricket academy located in Lahore's Valancia Town.

His son Ibtisam Azhar is a cricketer as well, playing as an all-rounder.

== Early career ==
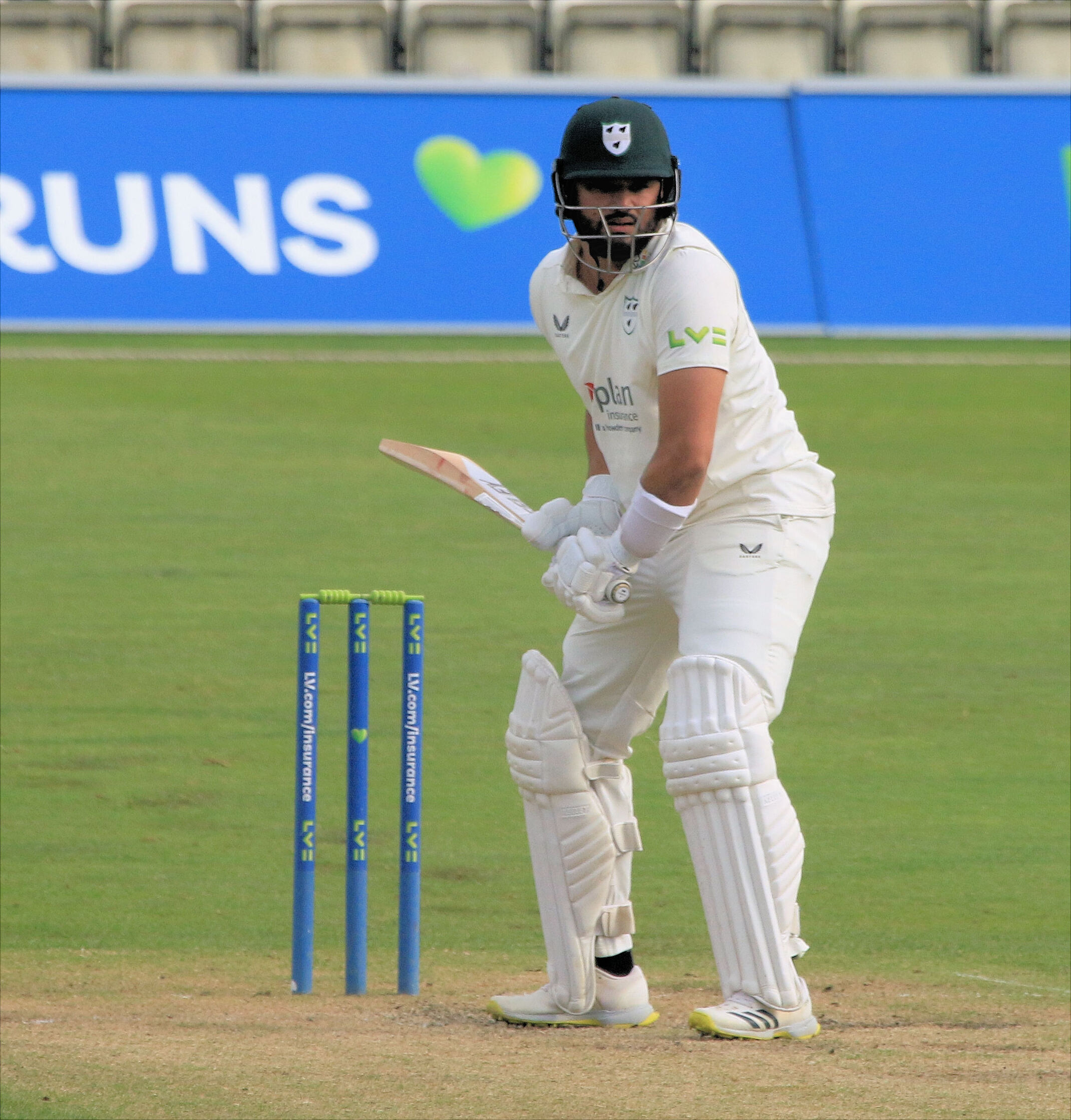
Ali batting for Worcestershire CCC in 2023.

Ali started playing cricket primarily as a bowler when he was aged 13. He made his first-class debut in 2002, at the age of 16, as a leg spinner. In his early days, he used to bat at number 9, but was later elevated to number 8 when started playing for Khan Research Laboratories.

In 2004, at the age of 19, he shifted to Scotland and started playing cricket for Huntly Cricket Club. During the period at Huntly, he developed his skills as a batsman and used to open the batting for the club. He played in Scotland between 2004 and 2007.

== Domestic career ==
After moving back to Pakistan, he started playing regularly for Khan Research Laboratories, and scored 503 runs at the batting average of 50.25 in 2007–2008 season. Later, in 2008–2009 season, he scored 788 runs at the average of 35 with performances such as 99 and 25 in the Quaid-e-Azam Trophy final. Because of his performances, he was selected in Pakistan A cricket team for the tours of Australia and Sri Lanka.

In 2016, Ali was appointed captain of Lahore Qalandars in the first edition of Pakistan Super League. He played 7 matches and scored 180 runs in the Tournament.

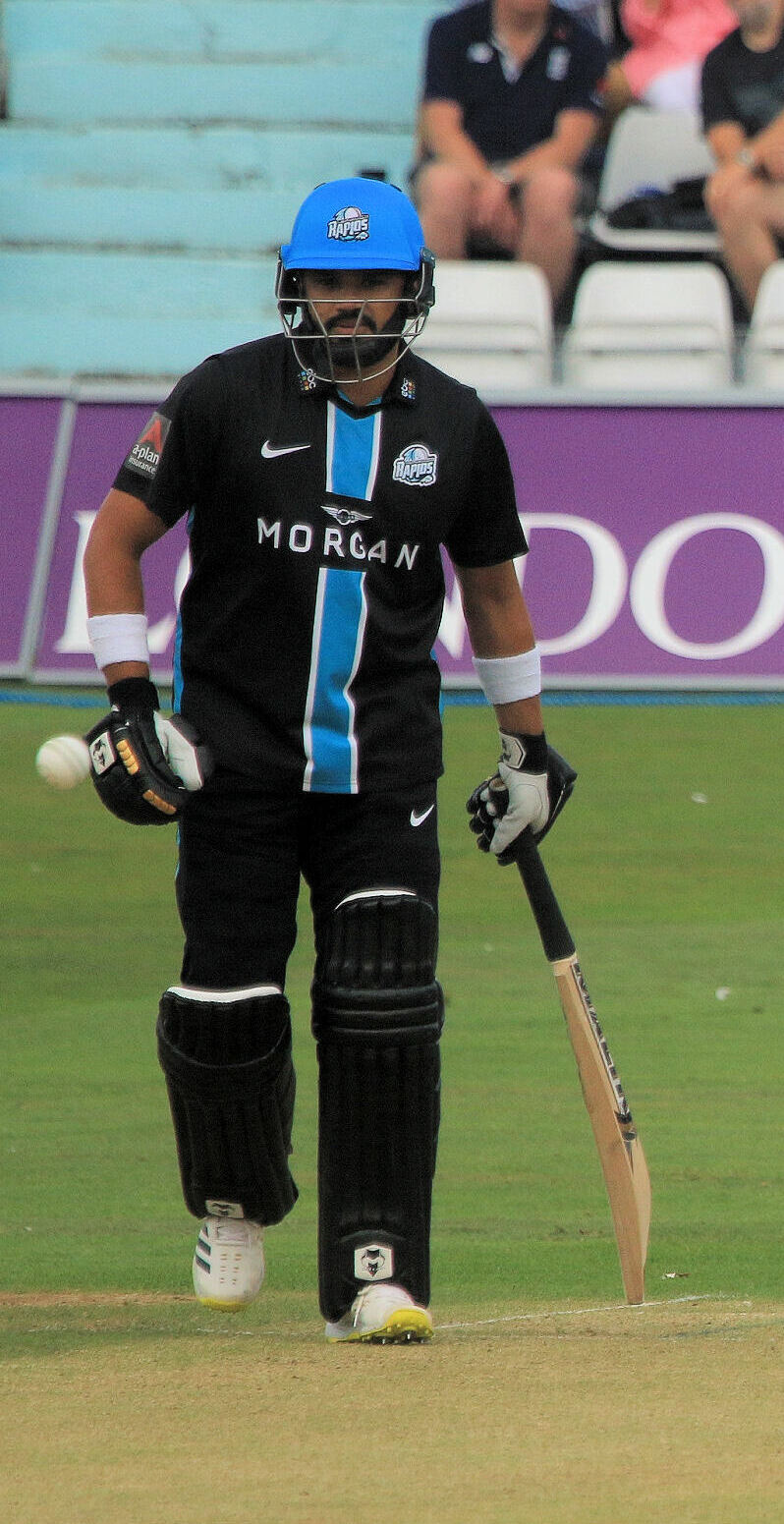
Azhar Ali batting for Worcestershire in 2022

On 16 July 2018, Ali signed for Somerset for the final seven matches of the County Championship season, replacing the injured Matt Renshaw. Ali subsequently scored a century in his debut match for Somerset, against Worcestershire.

In September 2019, he was named in Central Punjab's squad for the 2019–20 Quaid-e-Azam Trophy tournament. In August 2020, he was retained in Central Punjab's squad for the 2020–21 domestic season. In February 2022, he was signed by Worcestershire as Matthew Wade replacement for 2022 county championship.

In December 2023, he was named in Sui Northern Gas Pipelines Limited's squad for the 2023–24 President's Trophy. On 4 January 2024, he scored his 50th century in first-class cricket against Khan Research Laboratories.

== International career ==
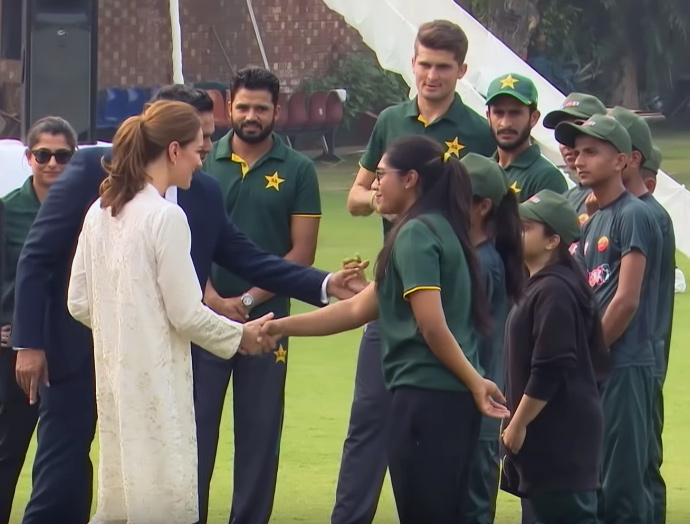
Azhar Ali, Shaheen Afridi, Hassan Ali and other Pakistani cricketers, with Catherine (Duchess of Cambridge) in 2019

In 2010, he moved back to Scotland again in order play for Huntly club. At the same time, Pakistan cricket team were scheduled to tour England and he was included in the Test squad.

=== Starting against Australia and England ===
Following the exclusion of middle-order stalwarts Younus Khan and Mohammad Yousuf from the Pakistani team in 2010, Ali was drafted into the lineup for the Test series against Australia and England in July 2010. He made his debut against Australia in July, along with Umar Amin; Ali scored 17 runs in his debut innings before he was caught behind by Tim Paine. In the second innings, he scored 42 as Pakistan lost the match by 150 runs. In the second Test match against Australia, he scored 30 runs in the first innings, followed by his maiden half century in the second as Pakistan recorded their first Test victory over the Australians in fifteen years. He struggled in the first two Tests against England, recording a 32-ball duck during the second match as Pakistan were bundled out for 72. Following these disastrous collapses Mohammad Yousuf was recalled to the squad and Amin lost his place, but Ali was given another opportunity and found his feet in the third Test, scoring an unbeaten 92.

=== South Africa series in November 2010 ===
Ali retained his place in the Test squad for the series against South Africa in November. He scored half centuries in both innings of the first Test, and helped Pakistan, chasing an improbable 451, avoid defeat with a crucial fourth-innings partnership with the returning Younus Khan. He top-scored with 90 in the first innings of the second Test, before producing another solid performance alongside captain Misbah-ul-Haq in the second innings, finishing unbeaten after facing 135 deliveries to secure another draw.

=== January 2011: Tour of New Zealand ===
Following consistent performances against South Africa backed up with experience against England and Australia the selectors picked Ali for the two-match Test series against New Zealand in January 2011, also young Pakistan batsman Asad Shafiq was given a place alongside Ali. In the first innings of the first match Ali only managed 18 and wasn't required to bat in the following innings as Pakistan won by 10-wickets. During the second match of the series Ali registered his sixth half-century.

=== June 2012: Tour of Sri Lanka ===
Ali was picked in both the ODI and the Test squad for the Sri Lankan tour in 2012. He was impressive in the ODIs by scoring 96 in the 2nd ODI and 81* in the 4th ODI, and became the second Pakistani to carry his bat after Saeed Anwar. He finished the series as the leading run-scorer for Pakistan Ali made his 4th Test hundred and finished on 157 in the 1st innings of the 2nd Test at SSC. Ali continued his good form and made consecutive centuries as he scored 136 in the 2nd innings. His crucial innings enabled him make into the Top-10 of ICC Test Rankings for the first time, as he joined Graeme Smith on 753 points.

=== June 2017 ICC Champions Trophy ===
Azhar Ali and Fakhar Zaman's partnership of 118 runs in the match against England made it the highest in the Champions Trophy history for Pakistan, and the highest opening in an ODI since 2009. The duo then scored another impressive 128 runs in the final against India. Pakistan won the match by 180 runs, the highest margin of victory for any team in an ICC tournament final.

=== January 2021: South Africa's tour of Pakistan ===
In January 2021, he was named in Pakistan's 17-man squad for their historic home Test series against South Africa. Azhar scored a half century in the first Test before being dismissed for 51.

=== Captaincy ===
After Misbah-ul-Haq retired from ODIs, the Pakistan Cricket Board (PCB) had a tough job to do while appointing Misbah's successor. The potential candidates were either too inconsistent or had some disciplinary issues. Sarfraz Ahmad gave the selectors a long thought but the board finally decided to go in favor of Azhar Ali who hadn't played ODI cricket for almost 2 years at the time of his appointment. While this decision was opposed by many, Ali seemed determined to take the Pakistani team right on top.

==== Pakistan tour of Bangladesh ====
At the end of April, Pakistan ended up on the wrong team of a whitewash in Bangladesh. Under his captaincy, Pakistan played their first ODI series against Bangladesh. The tournament was disappointing as Pakistan lost all three ODIs. Ali came to the team with good scores of 62 and 101, his maiden ODI century but could not prevent his team from the whitewash. This was Pakistan's first series lost to Bangladesh.

==== Zimbabwe tour of Pakistan ====
Zimbabwe tour to Pakistan, after a lapse of six years, proved fruitful for him as Pakistan under his captaincy won the three match ODI series 2–0. He scored his second ODI century in front of the home crowd in the second ODI.

==== Pakistan tour of Sri Lanka ====
Pakistan's quest for ICC Champions Trophy qualification received a significant boost against Sri Lanka. Pakistan cricket team won the series after nine years in Sri Lanka. Pakistan team had got last victory in 2006 in the leadership of Inzamam Ul Haq. Ali scored most of the runs in this series, and became the Fastest Pakistani batsman to 1000 ODI runs, scoring them in only 21 innings.

Ahmed Shehzad spoke at the end of the game praising Ali for allowing him to play his natural game. He said

"Azhar is in the form of his life at the moment and he gives us confidence to play our natural game, When you see him at the other end, it makes you bat positively".

==== Pakistan tour of England ====
In August 2016, Pakistan toured England and Ireland for a full tour. Ali had a good Test tour highlight of which was 139 against England in Birmingham in a losing effort. He scored 30 in the final Test at the Oval to finish Test series at 2–2. He finished as the second highest runscorer for Pakistan in the Test series. The following ODI series for Pakistan was abysmal and was one of the worst in history of Pakistan in England. Ali captained his team in a 4–1 losing effort, which included a thumping 169 run loss in which England scored a world record score of 444 runs in an innings. Ali scored 208 runs in 5 innings including two scores of 80 and 82.His tally was the second most of any Pakistani in that series.

Ali was criticized for his captaincy as well as low personal scoring rate. After the England series there were rumors that Ali might step down as captain of Pakistan ODI team. He quashed all such rumors and vowed to continue as captain of ODI team. PCB and coach Mickey Arthur backed him and he was retained as ODI skipper against West Indies in UAE.

==== West Indies in UAE against Pakistan in 2016 ====
After winning the T20 series 3–0 Pakistan won the ODI series as well. Pakistan won the first match by 111 Runs making it the 4th highest winning margin against west indies by Pakistan. Babar Azam scored record 3 back to back centuries and Pakistan won the 2nd match by 59 runs. Ali scored his 3rd ODI hundred in the 3rd match of the series and became the first Pakistani captain to score 3 centuries as captain. Also Pakistan won the Test match series 2–1 and Azhar ali scored 300 in the first Test match.

He was also named in the Test XI of the year 2016 by Cricinfo.

==== Australia in 2016 ====
During the Australia tour, Ali only managed to score 37 runs in three-ODIs and lost the series 4–1 to Australia. He only scored well in Test series. He scored a double century in the second Test match at Melbourne, which is recorded as the highest Test score by a Pakistani player in Australia and the second highest Test score by a visiting player at the Melbourne Cricket Ground. Despite this, his contribution from the bat and with captaincy was below par throughout the ODI series. With the conclusion of the series, Ali resigned from ODI captaincy in February 2017.

==== Australia in 2019 ====
In October 2019, ahead of Pakistan's tour to Australia, Sarfaraz Ahmed was sacked as captain of Pakistan's team, following Pakistan's poor run of form. Azhar was named as the captain of the Test team in his place.

==== England in 2020 ====
In June 2020, he was named as the Test captain of a 29-man squad for Pakistan's tour to England during the COVID-19 pandemic. In July, he was shortlisted in Pakistan's 20-man squad for the Test matches against England. In the third and final Test of the series, he scored his 6,000th run in Test cricket.

=== International centuries ===
Azhar has scored 19 centuries in Test matches and three in ODIs. His highest Test score of 302 not out came against West Indies in October 2016. His highest ODI score of 102 came against Zimbabwe in May 2015.

Test centuries
No.	Score	Against	Pos.	Inn.	Test	Venue	H/A/N	Date	Result	Ref
1	100	Sri Lanka	3	2	2/3	Dubai International Cricket Stadium, Dubai	Neutral	26 October 2011	Won	
2	157	England	3	3	3/3	Dubai International Cricket Stadium, Dubai	Neutral	3 February 2012	Won	
3	157	Sri Lanka	3	1	2/3	Sinhalese Sports Club Ground, Colombo	Away	30 June 2012	Drawn	
4	136	Sri Lanka	3	3	3/3	Pallekele International Cricket Stadium, Kandy	Away	8 July 2012	Drawn	
5	103	Sri Lanka	3	4	3/3	Sharjah Cricket Association Stadium, Sharjah	Neutral	16 January 2014	Won	
6	109	Australia	3	1	2/2	Sheikh Zayed Cricket Stadium, Abu Dhabi	Neutral	30 October 2014	Won	
7	100*	Australia	3	3	2/2	Sheikh Zayed Cricket Stadium, Abu Dhabi	Neutral	30 October 2014	Won	
8	226	Bangladesh	3	1	2/2	Sher-e-Bangla Cricket Stadium, Dhaka	Away	6 May 2015	Won	
9	117	Sri Lanka	3	3	2/3	Paikiasothy Saravanamuttu Stadium, Colombo	Away	25 June 2015	Lost	
10	139	England	3	2	3/4	Edgbaston, Birmingham	Away	3 August 2016	Lost	
11	302*	West Indies	2	1	1/3	Dubai International Cricket Stadium, Dubai	Neutral	13 October 2016	Won	
12	205*	Australia	2	1	2/3	Melbourne Cricket Ground, Melbourne	Away	26 December 2016	Lost	
13	105	West Indies	1	2	2/3	Kensington Oval, Bridgetown	Away	30 April 2017	Lost	
14	127	West Indies	1	1	3/3	Windsor Park, Roseau	Away	10 May 2017	Won	
15	134	New Zealand	3	2	3/3	Sheikh Zayed Cricket Stadium, Abu Dhabi	Neutral	3 December 2018	Lost	
16	118	Sri Lanka	3	3	3/3	National Stadium, Karachi	Home	19 December 2019	Won	
17	141*	England	3	2	3/3	Rose Bowl, Southampton	Away	21 August 2020	Drawn	
18	126	Zimbabwe	3	1	2/2	Harare Sports Club, Harare	Away	7 May 2021	Won	
19	185	Australia	3	1	1/3	Rawalpindi Cricket Stadium, Rawalpindi	Home	4 March 2022	Drawn	

ODI centuries
No.	Score	Against	Pos.	Inn.	S/R	Venue	H/A/N	Date	Result	Ref
1	101	Bangladesh	1	1	90.17	Sher-e-Bangla Cricket Stadium, Dhaka	Away	22 April 2015	Lost	
2	102	Zimbabwe	1	2	98.07	Gaddafi Stadium, Lahore	Home	29 May 2015	Won	
3	101	West Indies	1	1	92.66	Sheikh Zayed Cricket Stadium, Abu Dhabi	Neutral	5 October 2016	Won	

== Post-retirement ==
=== Cricket administration ===
In November 2024, Ali was appointed as the PCB's Head of Youth Development. In this role, he will focus on nurturing young talent, building grassroots structures, and mentoring players under the PCB Pathways Programme.
