= Kashif Ali (cricketer, born 2002) =

Pakistani cricketer (born 2002)

Kashif Ali کاشف علی
Personal information
- Born: 4 October 2002 (age 24); Karachi, Sindh, Pakistan
- Batting: Right-handed
- Bowling: Right-arm medium
- Role: Bowler

Domestic team information
- Years: Team
- 2022/23: Sindh 2nd XI
- 2023/24: Karachi Blues
- 2023/24: Khan Research Laboratories

Career statistics
| Competition | FC | T20 |
|---|---|---|
| Matches | 5 | 3 |
| Runs scored | 135 | 43 |
| Batting average | 27.00 | 21.50 |
| 100s/50s | 0/0 | 0/0 |
| Top score | 36 | 39* |
| Balls bowled | 762 | – |
| Wickets | 17 | – |
| Bowling average | 26.17 | – |
| 5 wickets in innings | 0 | – |
| 10 wickets in match | 0 | – |
| Best bowling | 4/33 | – |
| Catches/stumpings | 1/– | 1/– |
- Source: Cricinfo, 25 January 2025

Kashif Ali (Urdu: کاشف علی; born 4 October 2002) is a Pakistani cricketer who plays for Karachi Blues. Ali made his T20 debut for Karachi Blues against Peshawar on 24 November 2023 during the 2023–24 National T20 Cup. Ali made his first-class debut for Khan Research Laboratories against Water And Power Development Authority on 16 December 2023 during the 2023–24 President's Trophy.
