= Ali Usman =

Pakistani cricketer (born 1993)

Personal information
- Full name: Ali Usman
- Born: 6 June 1993 (age 33); Vehari, Punjab, Pakistan
- Batting: Right-handed
- Bowling: Slow left-arm orthodox
- Role: Bowler

International information
- National side: Pakistan (2026–present)
- Test debut (cap 263): 25 July 2026 v West Indies
- Last Test: 27 August 2026 v England

Career statistics
Competition	Test	FC	LA	T20
Matches	4	57	14	1
Runs scored	36	1,519	82	1
Batting average	5.14	21.09	8.20	1.00
100s/50s	0/0	1/5	0/0	0/0
Top score	16	105*	15	1
Balls bowled	617	11,745	745	24
Wickets	12	204	22	0
Bowling average	25.41	28.61	24.72	–
5 wickets in innings	1	13	0	–
10 wickets in match	0	5	0	–
Best bowling	5/95	6/9	4/33	–
Catches/stumpings	2/–	20/–	4/–	0/–
- Source: Cricinfo, 31 August 2026

Ali Usman (born 6 June 1993) is a Pakistani cricketer who plays as a slow left-arm orthodox bowler. He has played domestic cricket for Multan, Pakistan International Airlines, Pakistan Television, Pakistan Customs, State Bank of Pakistan and Southern Punjab.

Usman made his List A debut for Multan Tigers against Hyderabad Hawks in the 2013–14 One Day Cup on 21 November 2013. He made his first-class debut for Pakistan International Airlines against Rawalpindi in the 2016–17 Quaid-e-Azam Trophy on 22 October 2016, and his Twenty20 debut for Multan against Federally Administered Tribal Areas in the 2018–19 National T20 Cup on 15 December 2018.

In October 2025, Usman was awarded a category 3 domestic contract by the Pakistan Cricket Board (PCB) for the 2025–26 season. He finished as the leading wicket-taker in the Quaid-e-Azam Trophy in 2025–26, taking 48 wickets in eight matches for Multan at an average of 21.10. During the tournament, he took a ten-wicket match haul against Sialkot, including figures of 5 for 98 in each innings.

In January 2026, playing for Pakistan Television in the 2025–26 President's Trophy Grade-I, Usman took 6 wickets for 9 runs in the second innings and match figures of 10 for 75 against Sui Northern Gas Pipelines Limited as PTV defended 40 runs, the lowest successful defence in first-class cricket. He was later selected for the PCB's NCA red-ball camp in April 2026 and for the pre-season red-ball camp in June 2026.
