= Markhor IT Solutions cricket team =

Pakistani cricket team

Markhor IT Solutions
- مارخور

Personnel
- Captain: Khalid Usman
- Owner: Markhor IT Solutions

History
- President's Trophy wins: 1
- Official website: Website

The Markhor IT Solutions cricket team is a Pakistani team sponsored by the Lahore software engineering company Markhor IT Solutions.

In the 2026–27 season, for the first time, Markhor IT Solutions participated in the first-class President's Trophy. They qualified for promotion to the tournament by finishing second in the President's Trophy Grade-II in June 2026. Captained by Khalid Usman in the Grade-I tournament, by winning their last match in the seven-match round-robin, Markhor IT Solutions qualified for the final. They won the championship by defeating State Bank of Pakistan by 51 runs in the final at the Bagh-e-Jinnah ground in Lahore.
