= Shayan Sheikh =

Pakistani cricketer (born 1998)

Personal information
- Born: 5 May 1998 (age 28); Islamabad, Pakistan
- Batting: Right-handed
- Bowling: Slow Left arm orthodox

Domestic team information
- Years: Team
- 2018-2019: Khan Research Laboratories
- Source: Cricinfo, 22 November 2018

Shayan Sheikh (born 5 May 1998) is a Pakistani cricketer. He made his List A debut for Khan Research Laboratories in the 2017–18 Departmental One Day Cup on 9 January 2018. He made his first-class debut for Khan Research Laboratories in the 2018–19 Quaid-e-Azam Trophy on 19 November 2018.
