= Faisal Akram =

Pakistani cricketer

Personal information
- Full name: Faisal Akram
- Born: 20 August 2003 (age 23); Multan, Punjab, Pakistan
- Batting: Left-handed
- Bowling: Left-arm wrist-spin
- Role: Bowler

International information
- National side: Pakistan (2024–present)
- ODI debut (cap 246): 24 November 2024 v Zimbabwe
- Last ODI: 16 November 2025 v South Africa
- ODI shirt no.: 37

Domestic team information
- Years: Team
- 2021/22: Southern Punjab (squad no. 97)
- 2022–2023: Karachi Kings (squad no. 99)
- 2023/24: Pakistan Television
- 2024– Present: Multan Sultans (squad no. 37)

Career statistics
Competition	ODI	First-class	List A	T20
Matches	3	11	34	23
Runs scored	–	99	23	21
Batting average	–	7.61	2.30	5.25
100s/50s	0/0	0/0	0/0	0/0
Top score	–	24	8*	7
Balls bowled	117	2,127	1,458	426
Wickets	7	52	50	12
Bowling average	16.00	31.46	26.78	46.00
5 wickets in innings	0	5	1	0
10 wickets in match	0	1	0	0
Best bowling	3/24	7/47	5/24	2/25
Catches/stumpings	1/–	5/–	13/–	8/–
- Source: Cricinfo, 20 October 2025

Faisal Akram (born 20 August 2003) is a Pakistani cricketer. He plays as a left-arm wrist-spinner (chinaman).

== Youth career ==
In January 2021, playing for Southern Punjab U19 against Balochistan U19 at the LCCA Ground in Lahore, he claimed 6 for 32, guiding his side to a six‐wicket victory.

In December 2021, he was named in Pakistan's team for the 2022 ICC Under-19 Cricket World Cup in the West Indies.

== Domestic career ==
In September 2021, he was named in Southern Punjab's squad for the 2021–22 National T20 Cup. He made his Twenty20 debut on 24 September 2021, for Southern Punjab against Sindh in the 2021–22 National T20 Cup.

In December 2021, he was signed by the Karachi Kings following the players' draft for the 2022 Pakistan Super League. He made his List A debut on 6 March 2022, for Southern Punjab in the 2021–22 Pakistan Cup. He made his first-class debut for Pakistan Television on 22 December 2023, against Sui Northern Gas Pipelines Limited in the 2023–24 President's Trophy. In 2024 he was signed by the Multan Sultans for 2024 Pakistan Super League.

== International career ==
In October 2024, Akram earned his first call-up to Pakistan’s senior ODI squad for the Zimbabwe series. He made his ODI debut for Pakistan on 24 November 2024 against Zimbabwe and took 3 wickets.

== Playing style ==
In Cricinfo’s list of standout players to watch at the 2022 ICC Under-19 Cricket World Cup, Faisal Akram was highlighted as one of Pakistan’s most exciting young prospects. The article emphasized his rare skillset as a left-arm wrist-spinner (chinaman), noting that he consistently troubled top-order batters with sharp turn, deception through flight, and a well-disguised wrong’un. His performances in Pakistan’s domestic youth circuit, particularly his ability to take wickets in the middle overs, positioned him as one of the most dangerous spin options in the tournament. Analysts praised his potential to become Pakistan’s next elite wrist-spinner, drawing attention to his tactical maturity despite his young age.
