= Higher Education Commission cricket team =

Cricket team

Higher Education Commission
- League: President's Trophy

Personnel
- Captain: Sohail Tanvir
- Owner: Higher Education Commission

Team information
- Founded: 2003

History
- First-class debut: 22 December in 2023 at National Stadium, Karachi
- President's Trophy wins: 0

The Higher Education Commission cricket team is a departmental cricket team in Pakistan that has played first-class cricket in the President's Trophy. The team is sponsored and owned by the Higher Education Commission, and consists of the best cricketers among Pakistan's university students. The team does not have any geographical base. The team's captain for the 2024–25 President's Trophy was Muhammad Mohsin Khan.

== History ==
The team was founded in 2003 to take part in the 2003 Inter Departmental Qualifying Tournament. In May 2019, then prime minister Imran Khan revamped the domestic cricket structure in Pakistan, excluding departmental teams in favour of regional sides, therefore ending the participation of the team. The team was refounded in March 2023 after another revamp of the domestic structure.

In December 2023, the Pakistan Cricket Board (PCB) confirmed that Higher Education Commission would be one of the teams to participate in the 2023–24 President's Trophy. The team made their first-class debut on 22 December 2023, losing the match against Water and Power Development Authority. This was the first time the Higher Education Commission had competed in a major domestic tournament.

Higher Education Commission finished the 2024–25 President's Trophy in second-last place, with two wins from their eight matches, and were relegated to Grade II for the 2025–26 season.

== See also ==
- Pakistan Universities cricket team
- Pakistan University Grants Commission cricket team
