= Mohammad Rameez (cricketer, born 1995) =

Pakistani cricketer (born 1995)

Personal information
- Born: 18 August 1995 (age 31)
- Source: Cricinfo, 6 September 2018

Mohammad Rameez (born 18 August 1995) is a Pakistani cricketer. He made his List A debut for Lahore Blues in the 2018–19 Quaid-e-Azam One Day Cup on 6 September 2018. He made his first-class debut for Lahore Blues in the 2018–19 Quaid-e-Azam Trophy on 16 September 2018.
