= Taimur Khan (Punjab cricketer) =

Pakistani cricketer (born 1996)

Personal information
- Full name: Taimur Khan
- Born: 28 January 1996 (age 30); Chakwal, Punjab, Pakistan
- Batting: Right-handed
- Role: Wicket-keeper

Domestic team information
- Years: Team
- Rawalpindi Rams
- Sui Southern Gas Corporation
- Northern
- Rawalpindi
- Pakistan Television

Career statistics
Competition	First-class	List A	Twenty20
Matches	51	28	13
Runs scored	2,168	713	101
Batting average	27.44	32.40	16.83
100s/50s	3/11	1/3	0/0
Top score	166*	117*	23
Balls bowled	12	–	–
Wickets	0	–	–
Bowling average	–	–	–
5 wickets in innings	0	–	–
10 wickets in match	0	–	–
Best bowling	–	–	–
Catches/stumpings	135/8	32/2	6/0
- Source: Cricinfo, 15 April 2026

Taimur Khan (born 28 January 1996) is a Pakistani cricketer. Khan is a right-handed batsman and wicket-keeper. He was born in Chakwal, Punjab, Pakistan.

Khan represented Chakwal and Rawalpindi age-group sides before playing senior domestic cricket for Rawalpindi Rams, Sui Southern Gas Corporation, Northern, Rawalpindi and Pakistan Television. He made his first-class debut for Rawalpindi Rams against Lahore Lions in the 2014–15 Quaid-e-Azam Trophy. He made his List A debut for Rawalpindi against National Bank of Pakistan in the 2015–16 National One-Day Cup.

Khan scored his maiden first-class century in October 2023, when he made an unbeaten 166 for Rawalpindi against Lahore Blues after being 137 not out overnight in the side's second innings following on. In December 2023, playing for Pakistan Television against Ghani Glass, he made 160 in the second innings after his side had been forced to follow on, sharing a third-wicket partnership of 263 with Mohammad Suleman.

His third first-class hundred came in January 2025, when he made 108 not out for Pakistan Television against Sui Northern Gas Pipelines Limited in a successful chase of 335, adding 210 for the sixth wicket with Amad Butt.

Khan scored his only List A century in December 2025, when he made 117 not out from 100 balls for Pakistan Television against Oil & Gas Development Company Limited in the 2025–26 President's Cup Grade-I (One Day). His innings contained nine fours and six sixes, although Pakistan Television were defeated by five wickets.
