= Sahir Associates cricket team =

Pakistani cricket team

The Sahir Associates cricket team is a Pakistani cricket team sponsored by the Lahore real estate development company Sahir Associates. In the 2025–26 season, for the first time, it participated in Pakistan's first-class and List A competitions. It qualified for promotion to the 2025–26 President's Trophy Grade-I by winning the final of the President's Trophy Grade-II in June 2025.

Sahir Associates won at the highest domestic level for the first time on 12 December 2025 when they defeated Ghani Glass in the third round of the 2025–26 President's Cup Grade-I (1-Day). Needing 328 runs in 50 overs, they reached their target in the 37th over, the captain Usman Khan scoring 159 not out off 98 balls. They finished the tournament in fifth place out of eight, with three wins from seven matches.

In the first-class President's Trophy tournament that began a few weeks later, Sahir Associates lost their first three matches, but then won three of their last four, finishing seventh out of eight teams. Khan Zaib was their leading bowler, with 32 wickets at an average of 19.43, while Mohammad Faiq was their leading batsman, with 500 runs at an average of 41.66.
