= Umar Kiyani =

Pakistani cricketer (born 1995)

Umar Kiani
Personal information
- Full name: Umar Abid Kiyani
- Born: 5 August 1995 (age 31); Islamabad, Pakistan
- Batting: Left-handed
- Bowling: Right-arm off-spin
- Role: Opening batsman
- Source: ESPNcricinfo, 8 October 2016

Umar Kiyani (born 5 August 1995) is a Pakistani cricketer. He made his first-class debut for Islamabad in the 2014–15 Quaid-e-Azam Trophy on 30 October 2014.
