= State Bank of Pakistan Sports Complex =

Cricket ground

- Location: Karachi, Sindh, Pakistan
- Country: Pakistan
- Establishment: 2009; 17 years ago
- As of 27 November 2016; Source: Ground profile

The State Bank of Pakistan Sports Complex is a sports complex located in North Nazimabad, Karachi, Pakistan.

== History ==
It was established in 2009.

The first recorded match on the ground was in the 2011/12 season. The ground hosted two first-class matches in the 2016/17 cricket season. It was selected as a venue to host matches in the knockout stage of the 2016–17 Quaid-e-Azam Trophy. In September 2019, the Pakistan Cricket Board named it as one of the venues to host matches in the 2019–20 Quaid-e-Azam Trophy. In December 2023, the PCB named it as one of the venues to host matches in the 2023–24 President's Trophy.

== See also ==
- List of cricket grounds in Pakistan
