= Rameez Aziz =

Pakistani cricketer (born 1990)

Personal information
- Born: 15 September 1990 (age 36); Karachi, Pakistan
- Batting: Left-handed
- Bowling: Right-arm off break

Domestic team information
- Years: Team
- 2018—2019: Sindh
- 2023/24—present: Karachi Whites (squad no. 10)
- Source: Cricinfo, 28 November 2015

Rameez Aziz (born 15 September 1990) is a Pakistani first-class cricketer who plays for Habib Bank Limited. In April 2018, he was named in Sindh's squad for the 2018 Pakistan Cup. In March 2019, he was named in Punjab's squad for the 2019 Pakistan Cup. In September 2019, he was named in Sindh's squad for the 2019–20 Quaid-e-Azam Trophy tournament.
