= Ayaz Tasawwar =

Pakistani cricketer (born 1990)

Personal information
- Born: 10 December 1990 (age 35); Sheikhupura, Pakistan
- Batting: Left-handed
- Bowling: Legbreak
- Source: Cricinfo, 21 December 2015

Ayaz Tasawwar (born 10 December 1990) is a Pakistani first-class cricketer who plays for Balochistan. In January 2021, he was named in Balochistan's squad for the 2020–21 Pakistan Cup.
