= United Bank Limited Sports Complex =

Cricket ground

Coordinates: 24.93117°N 67.08451°E

- Interactive map of United Bank Limited Sports Complex
- Location: Karachi, Sindh, Pakistan
- Country: Pakistan
- Establishment: 1992; 34 years ago
- As of 17 September 2016; Source: Ground profile

The United Bank Limited Sports Complex is a sports complex in Karachi, Pakistan. It was the home ground of the United Bank Limited cricket team, from 1975 until the team's disbanding in 2018. Besides cricket, the complex also contains facilities for basketball, field hockey, tennis, and table tennis, and occupies around 17 acres of area.

Since its establishment in 1992, the ground has hosted more than 120 first-class cricket matches.

== History ==
United Bank Limited Sports Complex was established in 1992 by United Bank Limited on an amenity plot awarded by the government under Martial Law Ordinance (MLO), to private organizations to build sport facilities in the city.

It was selected as a venue to host matches in the 2016–17 Quaid-e-Azam Trophy. In September 2019, the Pakistan Cricket Board named it as one of the venues to host matches in the 2019–20 Quaid-e-Azam Trophy. In December 2023, the PCB named it as one of the venues to host matches in the 2023–24 President's Trophy.

== See also ==
- List of cricket grounds in Pakistan
