= Khalid Usman =

Pakistani cricketer

Personal information
- Full name: Khalid Usman
- Born: 1 March 1986 (age 40); Maneri, North-West Frontier Province, Pakistan
- Batting: Right-handed
- Bowling: Slow left-arm orthodox
- Role: Bowling all-rounder

Domestic team information
- Years: Team
- 2007/08–2025/26: Abbottabad
- 2013/14–2025/26: Water and Power Development Authority
- 2010/11–2022/23: Khyber Pakhtunkhwa
- 2018–2019, 2022: Peshawar Zalmi

Career statistics
Competition	First-class	List A	Twenty20
Matches	150	133	99
Runs scored	5,886	1,858	625
Batting average	30.03	24.77	16.02
100s/50s	3/38	0/10	0/0
Top score	139*	91*	38*
Balls bowled	24,559	6,370	1,884
Wickets	441	180	86
Bowling average	26.53	27.22	25.68
5 wickets in innings	21	4	1
10 wickets in match	4	0	0
Best bowling	8/63	6/15	5/26
Catches/stumpings	82/–	63/–	41/–
- Source: Cricinfo, 13 April 2026

Khalid Usman (born 1 March 1986) is a Pakistani cricketer. Usman is a right-handed batsman who bowls slow left-arm orthodox. He was born in Maneri, in what was then the North-West Frontier Province.

Usman made his first-class debut for Abbottabad against Islamabad in the 2007–08 Quaid-e-Azam Trophy. He made his List A debut for Abbottabad Rhinos against Zarai Taraqiati Bank Limited in the ABN-AMRO Cup in March 2008, and his Twenty20 debut for the Rhinos against Faisalabad Wolves in the 2008–09 RBS Twenty-20 Cup. He later represented Abbottabad, Water and Power Development Authority, Khyber Pakhtunkhwa, Balochistan and Lahore Blues in domestic cricket, and also played for Peshawar Zalmi in the Pakistan Super League.

Among Usman's notable domestic performances, he took a career-best 8 wickets for 63 runs for Water and Power Development Authority against Lahore Blues in the 2016–17 Quaid-e-Azam Trophy. In September 2018, again playing against Lahore Blues, he took match figures of 11 for 104 for Water and Power Development Authority in the 2018–19 Quaid-e-Azam Trophy. In the 2018–19 Quaid-e-Azam One Day Cup, he was the leading wicket-taker for Water and Power Development Authority, with 13 dismissals in 8 matches.

In November 2020, captaining Khyber Pakhtunkhwa against Northern, Usman scored his maiden first-class century, making an unbeaten 113 to help his side avoid the follow-on in the 2020–21 Quaid-e-Azam Trophy. In January 2021, he was retained as captain of Khyber Pakhtunkhwa for the 2020–21 Pakistan Cup, and led the side to the title after a seven-wicket victory over Central Punjab in the final. In February 2026, captaining Water and Power Development Authority, he led the department to its first President's Trophy title. Eight months later, he captained Markhor IT Solutions to the next season's President's Trophy title.

Overall, Usman has played 144 first-class matches. In these, he has scored 5,732 runs at a batting average of 30.48, making 38 half-centuries and 3 centuries. His highest score, an unbeaten 139, came in first-class cricket. He has taken 412 wickets at a bowling average of 27.30, with best figures of 8/63, while taking 18 five-wicket hauls and 3 ten-wicket match hauls. In 133 List A matches, he has scored 1,858 runs at an average of 24.77 and taken 180 wickets, with best figures of 6/15. In 99 Twenty20 matches, he has scored 625 runs and taken 86 wickets, with best figures of 5/26.
