= President's Trophy (cricket) =

Cricket tournament in Pakistan

- Countries: Pakistan
- Administrator: PCB
- Format: First-class
- First edition: 1960–61
- Latest edition: 2026–27
- Tournament format: Round-robin and knockout
- Number of teams: 8
- Current champion: Water and Power Development Authority (1st title)
- Most successful: Karachi (11 titles)
- Website: Pakistan Cricket Board

The President's Trophy (formerly Patron's Trophy) is a cricket competition that is held in Pakistan. It was previously held between 1960–61 and 2018–19 but was refounded from the 2023–24 season. It consists of teams representing the government and semi-government departments, corporations, commercial organisations, business houses, banks, airlines, and educational institutions.

Matches in the competition were afforded first-class status in most seasons until 2006–07, when the domestic first-class competition was reorganised and merged into the Quaid-e-Azam Trophy by the Pakistan Cricket Board (PCB). From then on, the Patron's Trophy was a Grade II competition until a major revamp of domestic cricket in 2019 brought an end to the competition.

For the 2012–13 domestic season a new first-class competition, called the President's Trophy Grade I, was created for departments. It was announced as a renaming of the Patron's Trophy, and ran for just two seasons before the PCB merged the regions and departments back into a reorganised Quaid-i-Azam Trophy for the 2014–15 season. The President's Trophy was refounded again from the 2023/24 season after another revamp of the domestic structure.

== History ==
The competition was founded in 1960–61 as the Ayub Trophy, named after then President of Pakistan, Ayub Khan. In 1970–71 the competition was renamed the BCCP Trophy (PCB was then named the Board of Control for Cricket in Pakistan or BCCP), and two years later it received the title BCCP Patron's Trophy, recognising its purpose as a competition for departmental teams, as opposed to the Quaid-i-Azam Trophy, which was primarily contested by teams from regional associations. A year later, in 1973–74, the Pentangular Trophy was introduced, contested by the leading teams from both competitions.

The President's Trophy has most often been contested by all departmental teams, but has been a mixed competition with regional associations and even all associations. Matches in the competition had the first-class status until 2006–07 with the exception of the seasons from 1979 to 1983, and the 1999–2000 season. When it has not been a first-class competition, the Patron's Trophy has commonly acted as a qualifying competition for the Quaid-i-Azam Trophy by means of promotion and relegation.

== Winners ==
Season	Team
Ayub Trophy
1960–61	Railways + Quetta
1961–62	Karachi
1962–63	Karachi
1963–64	No competition
1964–65	Karachi
1965–66	Karachi Blues
1966–67	No competition
1967–68	Karachi Blues
1968–69	No competition
1969–70	Pakistan International Airlines
BCCP Trophy
1970–71	Pakistan International Airlines
1971–72	Pakistan International Airlines
BCCP Patron's Trophy
1972–73	Karachi Blues
1973–74	Railways
1974–75	National Bank of Pakistan
1975–76	National Bank of Pakistan
1976–77	Habib Bank
1977–78	Habib Bank
1978–79	National Bank of Pakistan
1979–80	Industrial Development Bank
1980–81	Rawalpindi
1981–82	Allied Bank Limited
1982–83	Pakistan Automobiles Corporation
1983–84	Karachi Blues
1984–85	Karachi Whites
1985–86	Karachi Whites
1986–87	National Bank of Pakistan
1987–88	Habib Bank
1988–89	Karachi
1989–90	Karachi Whites
1990–91	Agriculture Development Bank
1991–92	Habib Bank
1992–93	Habib Bank
1993–94	Agriculture Development Bank
1994–95	Allied Bank Limited
PCB Patron's Trophy
1995–96	Agriculture Development Bank
1996–97	United Bank Limited
1997–98	Habib Bank
1998–99	Habib Bank
1999–2000	Lahore City Blues
2000–01	Pakistan Customs
2001–02	National Bank of Pakistan
2002–03	No competition
2003–04	Agriculture Development Bank
ABN-AMRO Patron's Trophy
2004–05	Habib Bank + Pakistan International Airlines
2005–06	National Bank of Pakistan
2006–07	Habib Bank
2007–08 to 2011–12	No competition
President's Trophy
2012–13	Sui Northern Gas Pipelines
2013–14	Sui Northern Gas Pipelines
2023–24	Sui Northern Gas Pipelines
2024–25	Pakistan Television
2025–26	Water and Power Development Authority
2026–27	Markhor IT Solutions
