= Water and Power Development Authority cricket team =

Cricket team

Water and Power Development Authority
- مقتدرہِ آب و برق ترقی

Personnel
- Captain: Khalid Usman
- Owner: Water and Power Development Authority

Team information
- Colours: Blue
- Home ground: WAPDA Sports Complex, Lahore
- Capacity: 8,000

History
- Quaid-e-Azam Trophy wins: 1
- President's Trophy wins: 1 (2025–26)
- Official website: www.wapda.gov.pk

The Water and Power Development Authority (WAPDA) cricket team is a first-class cricket side in Pakistan that plays in the Quaid-e-Azam Trophy, Patron's Trophy, Pentangular Trophy and also competes in limited-overs cricket. It is owned by the Water and Power Development Authority, the national body responsible for the development and maintenance of water and power resources in Pakistan.

== History ==
Water and Power Development Authority first competed at first-class level in the 1975–76 season, but they did not become a permanent part of top-level domestic competitions until the 1997–98 Patron's Trophy, when they finished last out of eight, without a win. They became more successful in the twenty-first century, and won several trophies, including the 2016–17 Quaid-e-Azam Trophy.

In May 2019, Pakistan's Prime Minister Imran Khan revamped the domestic cricket structure in Pakistan, excluding departmental teams in favour of regional sides, therefore ending the participation of the team. In August 2023, the PCB announced the return of departmental cricket with the start of 2023–24 President's Trophy, in which Water and Power Development Authority took part. At the end of the 2024–25 President's Trophy, in which WAPDA finished fifth out of nine teams, they had played 234 first-class matches, for 96 wins, 56 losses, 81 draws and one tie.

Water and Power Development Authority won the 2025–26 President's Trophy Grade-I, but the Pakistan Cricket Board barred them from the 2026–27 President's Trophy Grade-I, along with Sahir Associates, after the two teams were unable to comply with regulations introduced by Board in June 2026.

== Honours ==
Quaid-e-Azam Trophy

- 1986/87 (3rd Place)
- 2002/03 (Quarter-Final)
- 2016/17 (Winner)

Patron's Trophy

- 1986/87 (Pre-Quarter-Final)
- 2006/07 (Quadrangular Stage)

National One-day Championship

- 1997/98 (Final Round)
- 1998/99 (Final Round)
- 1999/2000 (Semi-Final)
- 2001/02 (Semi-Final)
- 2002/03 (Runner-up)
- 2004/05 (Winner)
- 2005/06 (Semi-Final)
- 2007/08 (Super Eight)
- 2010/11 (Semi-Final)

== See also ==
- List of Water and Power Development Authority cricketers
- Pakistan Cricket Board
- Water and Power Development Authority
