= Ghani Glass cricket team =

Cricket team

Ghani Glass
- League: President's Trophy

Personnel
- Captain: Shan Masood
- One Day captain: Moeez Ghani
- Owner: Ghani Group of Companies

Team information
- Founded: 2017

History
- First-class debut: 16 December in 2023 at National Stadium, Karachi
- President's Trophy wins: 0

Ghani Glass cricket team is a departmental cricket team that plays first-class cricket in the President's Trophy in Pakistan. The team is sponsored by Ghani Glass and owned by Ghani Group of Companies. The team does not have any geographical base. The team's captain in 2023–24 was Shan Masood.

== History ==
The team was founded in 2017 to take part in the Grade II of 2016–17 Patron's Trophy. In May 2019, then Prime Minister Imran Khan revamped the domestic cricket structure in Pakistan, excluding departmental teams in favour of regional sides, therefore ending the participation of the team. The team was refounded in March 2023 after a revamp of the domestic structure. In December 2023, the Pakistan Cricket Board (PCB) confirmed that Ghani Glass would be one of the teams to participate in the 2023–24 President's Trophy. The team made their first-class debut on 16 December 2023, drawing the match against Sui Northern Gas Pipelines Limited. This was the first time that Ghani Glass competed in a first-class tournament in Pakistan.

== Current squad ==
The following squad was announced for the 2023/24 season:

- Shan Masood (c)
- Sharjeel Khan
- Kashif Ali
- Tayyab Tahir
- Mohsin Raza
- Farhan Sarfraz
- Hussain Talat
- Shadab Khan
- Saeed Malik
- Noman Ali
- Mohammad Irfan
- Shahbaz Javed
- Saad Nasim
- Sheraz Khan
- Muhammad Musa
- Moeez Ghani
- Niaz Khan
- Ghulam Mudassar
- Ahad Malik
- Ghulam Haider
