= Pakistan Television cricket team =

Pakistani cricket team

Personnel
- Owner: Pakistan Television Corporation

Team information
- Founded: 2023 (refounded)
- Official website: ptv.com.pk

Pakistan Television cricket team is a first-class cricket team sponsored by the Pakistan Television Corporation. They began competing in Pakistan's first-class, List A and Twenty20 tournaments in the 2010–11 season. They won the 2024–25 President's Trophy.

After playing for some seasons in the non-first-class grades of the Patron's Trophy, Pakistan Television were promoted to first-class status to play in the Quaid-e-Azam Trophy in the 2010–11 season. They played 9 matches, winning 3, losing 2 and drawing 4, and finished sixth out of 10 teams in Division Two. Awais Zia hit their highest score of 232 (out of a team total of 426) against State Bank of Pakistan.

They returned to non-first-class status in 2011–12. They won the final in Grade Two of the Patron's Trophy in 2012–13, and resumed at first-class level in 2013–14 in the top level of the Patron's Trophy, but they finished last out of eleven, with 2 wins, 7 losses and a draw. They also finished last in the President's Cup One-Day Tournament, with 2 wins and 8 losses.

They lost their first-class status in 2014, but regained it in 2017, and returned to the Quaid-e-Azam Trophy for the 2017–18 tournament. In November 2017, in round 7 of the tournament, they were bowled out for 37 runs in their second innings against Khan Research Laboratories. This was the fifth-lowest total in the history of the Quaid-e-Azam Trophy. In all, Pakistan Television played 40 first-class matches between October 2010 and October 2018.

In May 2019, Pakistan's Prime Minister Imran Khan revamped the domestic cricket structure in Pakistan, excluding departmental teams like Pakistan Television in favour of regional sides, therefore ending the participation of the team. In August 2023, the PCB announced the return of departmental cricket with the start of 2023–24 President's Trophy, therefore resuming the participation of the team. Pakistan Television won the final in 2024–25, defeating State Bank of Pakistan by three wickets.
