= Khan Research Laboratories cricket team =

Cricket team

Khan Research Laboratories
- لیبارٹریاں تحقیقاتی خان

Personnel
- Captain: Mohammad Babar Azam
- Coach: Saqlain Mushtaq
- Owner: Khan Research Laboratories

Team information
- Colours
- Founded: 1997
- Home ground: Khan Research Laboratory Ground
- Capacity: 8,000

History
- President's Cup wins: 1 (2025–26)
- Official website: www.krl.com.pk

Khan Research Laboratories is a Pakistani first-class cricket side that plays in the Quaid-e-Azam Trophy, and also competed in limited overs cricket. It is sponsored by Pakistani nuclear enrichment facility Khan Research Laboratories (KRL).

They have played first-class cricket since the 1997–98 season. After the completion of the 2016–17 Quaid-e-Azam Trophy, they had played 171 matches, with 61 wins, 40 losses and 70 draws. Their home ground is KRL Stadium in Rawalpindi.

In May 2019, Pakistan's Prime Minister Imran Khan revamped the domestic cricket structure in Pakistan, excluding departmental teams in favour of regional sides, therefore ending the participation of the team. The Pakistan Cricket Board (PCB) was criticised in removing departmental sides, with players voicing their concern to revive the teams. However, in August 2023, the PCB announced the return of departmental cricket with the start of the 2023–24 President's Trophy, therefore resuming the participation of the team.

== Honours ==
Quaid-i-Azam Trophy (Runner-up)

- 2002/03
- 2008/09

Patron's Trophy (Quadrangular Stage)

- 2006/07

Patron's Trophy Grade II

- 1994/95 (Winner)
- 1996/97 (Runner-up)

National One Day Cup Division Two (Runner-up)

- 1999/2000
- 2010/11
- 2011/12
