= State Bank of Pakistan cricket team =

Cricket team

Personnel
- Owner: State Bank of Pakistan

Team information
- Founded: 2023 (refounded)
- Official website: www.sbp.org.pk/sbp_bsc/Sports.asp

State Bank of Pakistan cricket team is a first-class cricket team sponsored by the State Bank of Pakistan. They compete in Pakistan's first-class List A and Twenty20 tournaments.

== 1980s ==
State Bank of Pakistan made their first-class debut (along with Pakistan Automobiles Corporation) in the Quaid-i-Azam Trophy in 1983–84, but lost all their nine matches. In a bizarre match against Muslim Commercial Bank they were dismissed for 73 and 57. Wisden explained: "Owing to injuries State Bank batted six short in each innings." Apart from that match, their last one of the season, they were dismissed for between 114 and 255 in every innings. In the first match Tariq Javed scored 124 in the second innings. It was the team's only century in the 1980s.

They next played in the BCCP President's Cup in 1986–87, losing all three of their matches with totals of 186, 54, 79, 229, 111 and 106.

== 2010 onwards ==
State Bank of Pakistan returned to first-class status in 2010–11 with a stronger team, finishing second in Division Two of the Quaid-i-Azam Trophy with 4 wins, 1 loss and 4 draws from 9 matches. They were promoted to Division One for the 2011–12 season, where they finished fourth, with 5 wins, 3 losses and 3 draws. In the President's Trophy in 2012-13 they finished ninth out of eleven teams, with 2 wins, 4 losses and 3 draws, and in 2013-14 they finished tenth, with 2 wins, 5 losses and 3 draws.

In May 2019, Pakistan's Prime Minister Imran Khan revamped the domestic cricket structure in Pakistan, excluding departmental teams like State Bank in favour of regional sides, therefore ending the participation of the team. The Pakistan Cricket Board (PCB) was criticised in removing departmental sides, with players voicing their concern to revive the teams. However, in August 2023, the PCB announced the return of departmental cricket with the start of 2023–24 President's Trophy, therefore resuming the participation of the team.

== Notable players ==
- Mohammad Rizwan
- Maqbool Ahmed
- Mukhtar Ahmed
- Mohammad Ali
- Shaheen Afridi
- Faisal Athar
- Farhan Khan
- Babar Azam
- Hasan Mahmood
