= Sui Northern Gas Pipelines Limited cricket team =

Cricket team

Sui Northern Gas Pipelines Limited

Personnel
- Captain: Mohammad Rizwan
- Coach: Saqlain Mushtaq
- Owner: Sui Northern Gas Pipelines Limited

Team information
- Colours: Blue
- Founded: 2023 (refounded)
- Official website: www.sngpl.com.pk

Sui Northern Gas Pipelines Limited cricket team is a first-class cricket team that plays in the Patron's Trophy. In May 2019, Pakistan's Prime Minister Imran Khan revamped the domestic cricket structure in Pakistan, excluding departmental teams in favour of regional sides, therefore ending the participation of the team. The Pakistan Cricket Board (PCB) was criticised in removing departmental sides, with players voicing their concern to revive the teams. The team was refounded in the 2023/24 season after a revamp of the domestic structure.

== Honours ==
Mohammad Nissar Trophy

- 2008 - Winner

Quaid-i-Azam Trophy

- 2007-08 - Winner
- 2011-12 - Winner (Grade II)
- 2014-15 - Winner
- 2015-16 - Winner
- 2017-18 - Winner

President's Trophy

- 2012-13 - Winner
- 2013-14 - Winner
- 2014-15 - Winner
- 2015-16 - Winner
- 2023-24 - Winner

Pentangular Trophy

- 2009-10 - Winner

National One-day Championship

- 2007-08 - Winner
- 2009-10 - Winner

== See also ==
- Pakistan Cricket Board
- Sui Northern Gas Pipelines Limited
