= 2024 Pakistan Super League players draft =

Cricket league draft

General information
- Sport: Cricket
- Date: 13 December 2023
- Location: National Cricket Academy; Lahore, Pakistan

Overview
- League: Pakistan Super League
- Teams: 6
- First selection: David Willey, Multan Sultans

The player draft for the 2024 Pakistan Super League was held on 13 December 2023 at the National Cricket Academy, Lahore. Before the draft, teams were allowed to retain a maximum of eight players from the previous season and make transfers.

== Background ==
The Pakistan Cricket Board announced that Quetta Gladiators will have the first pick in the draft. A total of 485 foreign players registered for the tournament.

Each team had the right to exercise one wildcard pick. Each team had a right-to-match card which allowed franchises to buy back a maximum of one player they have released by paying a set fee in each category.

== Transfers ==
Hasan Ali and Islamabad's first round silver pick were traded from Islamabad United to Karachi Kings in return for Imad Wasim and Karachi's second round silver pick. Iftikhar Ahmed and Quetta's first round platinum pick were traded from Quetta Gladiators to Multan Sultans in exchange for Rilee Rossouw and Multan's first round silver pick. Naseem Shah and Quetta's third round platinum pick were traded from Quetta Gladiators to Islamabad United in exchange for Mohammad Wasim, Abrar Ahmed and Islamabad's first round platinum pick. Shan Masood and Multan's fourth round silver pick were traded from Multan Sultans to Karachi Kings in exchange for Faisal Akram and Karachi's first round silver pick. Karachi and Multan also swapped their first round diamond picks.

== Retained players ==
On 7 December 2023, the retained player's list was announced. The franchises were allowed to retain a maximum of eight players from the previous season. All the franchises fully utilized their quota of player retentions apart from Multan Sultans.

Class	Islamabad United	Karachi Kings	Lahore Qalandars	Multan Sultans	Peshawar Zalmi	Quetta Gladiators
Platinum	Shadab Khan; Naseem Shah		Shaheen Afridi	Mohammad Rizwan; Iftikhar Ahmed	Babar Azam; Rovman Powell	Rilee Rossouw
Diamond	Azam Khan; Imad Wasim (mentor)	James Vince; Hasan Ali	Haris Rauf; David Wiese	Khushdil Shah; Usama Mir	Saim Ayub; Tom Kohler-Cadmore	Mohammad Wasim Jr.; Jason Roy; Wanindu Hasaranga
Gold	Faheem Ashraf; Alex Hales; Colin Munro	Shan Masood; Shoaib Malik (mentor); Tabraiz Shamsi	Sikandar Raza; Abdullah Shafique; Zaman Khan	Abbas Afridi	Mohammad Haris; Aamer Jamal	Mohammad Hasnain; Abrar Ahmed; Sarfaraz Ahmed
Silver	Rumman Raees	Mir Hamza; Muhammad Akhlaq	Mirza Tahir Baig; Rashid Khan	Ihsanullah	Khurram Shahzad	Will Smeed
Emerging		Irfan Khan		Faisal Akram	Haseebullah Khan	

== Draft picks ==
The draft took place at the National Cricket Academy on 13 December 2023.

Class	Islamabad United	Karachi Kings	Lahore Qalandars	Multan Sultans	Peshawar Zalmi	Quetta Gladiators
Platinum	Jordan Cox (Note: Wild Card: The player's category was promoted through their franchise's Wild Card.)	Kieron Pollard; Daniel Sams; Mohammad Nawaz	Fakhar Zaman; Rassie van der Dussen	David Willey	Noor Ahmad	Sherfane Rutherford; Mohammad Amir
Diamond	Tymal Mills	Tim Seifert	Sahibzada Farhan	Dawid Malan	Asif Ali	
Gold				Reeza Hendricks; Reece Topley	Naveen-ul-Haq	
Silver	Matthew Forde; Salman Ali Agha; Qasim Akram; Shahab Khan	Mohammad Amir Khan; Anwar Ali; Arafat Minhas	Mohammad Imran; Dan Lawrence; Ahsan Hafeez	Tayyab Tahir; Shahnawaz Dahani; Mohammad Ali; Usman Khan	Salman Irshad (Note: Right To Match card (RTM): Player was picked by another franchise in the draft but their franchise from the previous season used their Right To Match card to bring them back in their squad.); Arif Yaqoob; Umair Afridi; Daniel Mousley	Saud Shakeel; Sajjad Ali; Usman Qadir; Omair Yousuf
Emerging	Hunain Shah; Ubaid Shah	Sirajuddin	Jahandad Khan; Syed Faridoun	Yasir Khan	Mohammad Zeeshan	Adil Naz; Khawaja Nafay
Supplementary	Shamyl Hussain; Tom Curran	Saad Baig; Jamie Overton	Shai Hope; Kamran Ghulam	Chris Jordan; Aftab Ibrahim	Lungi Ngidi; Mehran Mumtaz	Akeal Hosein; Sohail Khan

== Replacements ==
A supplementary and replacement player draft took place through a conference call on 29 January 2024, in which franchises were allowed to select two additional supplementary players and replacement players for any partially or fully unavailable players. Quetta reserved their pick in the fourth supplementary round. A second replacement draft was held on 16 February 2024.

Class	IU	KK	LQ	MS	PZ	QG
Supplementary	Obed McCoy; Haider Ali	Leus du Plooy; Mohammad Rohid	Bhanuka Rajapaksa; Tayyab Abbas	Johnson Charles; Mohammad Shehzad	Luke Wood; Sufiyan Muqeem	Laurie Evans; Usman Tariq

Player	Team	Replaced with	Unavailability	Reason
Lungi Ngidi	PZ	Waqar Salamkheil	Full	NOC issues
Khurram Shahzad	PZ	Arshad Iqbal	Partial	Injury
Noor Ahmad	PZ	Gus Atkinson	Full	National duty
Naveen-ul-Haq	PZ	Aimal Khan	Partial	National duty
Dan Lawrence	LQ	Lorcan Tucker	Partial	National duty
Rashid Khan	LQ	George Linde	Full	Injury
Tom Curran	IU	Muhammad Waseem	Full	Injury
Kieron Pollard	KK	Zahid Mahmood	Partial	—N/a
Tim Seifert	KK	Fawad Ali	Partial	National duty
Wanindu Hasaranga	QG	Bismillah Khan; Umar Amin	Partial	National duty
Gus Atkinson	PZ	Shamar Joseph	Partial	National duty
Jamie Overton	KK	Blessing Muzarabani	Full	NOC issues
Bhanuka Rajapaksa	LQ	Salman Fayyaz	Partial	National duty
Reece Topley	MS	Olly Stone	Partial	Injury
Sufiyan Muqeem	PZ	Paul Walter	Full	Injury
Shai Hope	LQ	Carlos Brathwaite	Partial	—N/a
Muhammad Waseem	IU	Martin Guptill	Full	National duty
Ihsanullah	MS	Ali Majid	Full	Injury
Saad Baig	KK	Zahid Mahmood	Full	Injury
Waqar Salamkheil	PZ	Hussain Talat	Full	—N/a
Olly Stone	MS	Richard Ngarava	Full	Injury
Tabraiz Shamsi	KK	Imran Tahir	Full	Domestic duty
Rassie van der Dussen	LQ	Sam Billings	Full	Domestic duty
