= 2024 Quetta Gladiators season =

2024 season of Quetta Gladiators

Quetta Gladiators
2024 season
- Coach: Shane Watson
- Captain: Rilee Rossouw
- PSL 2024: Playoffs (4th)
- Most runs: Saud Shakeel (323)
- Most wickets: Abrar Ahmed (10)

Quetta Gladiators is a franchise cricket team that represents Quetta in the Pakistan Super League (PSL). They were one of the six teams that are competing in the 2024 Pakistan Super League. The team was coached by Shane Watson, and captained by Rilee Rossouw.

== Squad ==
- Players with international caps are listed in **bold**.
- Ages are given as of 17 February 2024, the date of the first match in the tournament.

No.	Name	Nationality	Birth date	Category	Batting style	Bowling style	Year signed	Notes
Batsmen
9	**Rilee Rossouw**	South Africa	9 October 1989 (aged 34)	Platinum	Left-handed	Right-arm off break	2024	Captain
20	**Jason Roy**	England	21 July 1990 (aged 33)	Diamond	Right-handed	Right-arm medium	2022	
32	Laurie Evans	England	12 October 1987 (aged 36)	Supplementary	Right-handed	Right-arm medium-fast	2024	
33	Will Smeed	England	26 October 2001 (aged 22)	Silver	Right-handed	Right-arm off break	2022	
50	**Sherfane Rutherford**	West Indies	15 August 1998 (aged 25)	Platinum	Left-handed	Right-arm fast medium	2024	
59	**Saud Shakeel**	Pakistan	5 September 1997 (aged 26)	Silver	Left-handed	Left-arm orthodox	2023	Vice-captain
84	**Umar Amin**	Pakistan	16 October 1989 (aged 34)	—N/a	Left-handed	Right-arm medium	2024	Partial replacement for Wanindu Hasaranga
100	Omair Yousuf	Pakistan	27 December 1998 (aged 25)	Silver	Right-handed	—	2023	
999	Khawaja Nafay	Pakistan	13 February 2002 (aged 22)	Emerging	Right-handed	Right-arm off break	2024	
All-rounders
49	**Wanindu Hasaranga**	Sri Lanka	29 July 1997 (aged 26)	Diamond	Right-handed	Right-arm leg break	2023	
74	**Mohammad Wasim**	Pakistan	25 August 2001 (aged 22)	Diamond	Right-handed	Right-arm medium-fast	2024	
Wicket-keepers
21	Sajjad Ali	Pakistan	3 February 1994 (aged 30)	Silver	Right-handed	—	2024	
25	Bismillah Khan	Pakistan	1 March 1990 (aged 33)	—N/a	Right-handed	—	2023	Partial replacement for Wanindu Hasaranga
54	**Sarfaraz Ahmed**	Pakistan	22 May 1987 (aged 36)	Gold	Right-handed	—	2016	
Bowlers
5	**Mohammad Amir**	Pakistan	13 April 1992 (aged 31)	Platinum	Left-handed	Left-arm fast-medium	2024	
7	**Akeal Hosein**	West Indies	25 April 1993 (aged 30)	Supplementary	Left-handed	Left-arm orthodox	2024	
11	**Mohammad Hasnain**	Pakistan	5 April 2000 (aged 23)	Gold	Right-handed	Right-arm fast	2019	
14	**Sohail Khan**	Pakistan	6 March 1984 (aged 39)	Supplementary	Right-handed	Right-arm fast	2024	
17	Usman Tariq	Pakistan		Supplementary	Right-handed	Right-arm off break	2024	
40	**Abrar Ahmed**	Pakistan	16 October 1998 (aged 25)	Gold	Right-handed	Right-arm leg break	2024	
91	**Usman Qadir**	Pakistan	10 August 1993 (aged 30)	Silver	Left-handed	Right-arm leg break	2024	
TBA	Adil Naz	Pakistan	2 May 2002 (aged 21)	Emerging	Right-handed	Right-arm medium-fast	2024	

- Source: Cricinfo

== Administration and coaching staff ==
Name	Position
Moin Khan	Director
Shane Watson	Head coach
Shaun Tait	Bowling coach
Viv Richards	Mentor

== Kit manufacturers and sponsors ==
Shirt sponsor (chest)	Shirt sponsor (back)	Chest branding	Sleeve branding
Kingsmen Enterprise	Ziewnic	TCL	Stile, United Bank Limited

Playing kit

== Season standings ==
=== Points table ===
Pos	Team	Pld	W	L	NR	Pts	NRR
1	Multan Sultans (R)	10	7	3	0	14	1.150
2	Peshawar Zalmi (3rd)	10	6	3	1	13	0.147
3	Islamabad United (C)	10	5	4	1	11	0.224
4	Quetta Gladiators (4th)	10	5	4	1	11	−0.921
5	Karachi Kings	10	4	6	0	8	−0.192
6	Lahore Qalandars	10	1	8	1	3	−0.554

Source: ESPNcricinfo

The four top-ranked teams qualified for the Playoffs.
Advanced to Qualifier
Advanced to Eliminator 1

Notes

- C = Champions;
- R = Runner-up;
- (x) = Position at the end of the tournament;

== Group fixtures ==
Match 2
18 February 2024
14:00
Scorecard

Quetta Gladiators; 206/5 (20 overs)	v	Peshawar Zalmi; 190/6 (20 overs)
Jason Roy 75 (48); Salman Irshad 3/38 (4 overs)		Babar Azam 68 (42); Abrar Ahmed 2/29 (4 overs)

Quetta Gladiators won by 16 runs
Gaddafi Stadium, Lahore
Umpires: Michael Gough (Eng) and Tariq Rasheed (Pak)
Player of the match: Saud Shakeel (Quetta Gladiators)

- Peshawar Zalmi won the toss and elected to field.
- Mohammad Zeeshan (Peshawar Zalmi) made his T20 debut.

Match 4
19 February 2024
19:00 (D/N)
Scorecard

(H) Lahore Qalandars; 187/7 (20 overs)	v	Quetta Gladiators; 188/5 (19.1 overs)
Sahibzada Farhan 62 (43); Akeal Hosein 2/17 (4 overs)		Khawaja Nafay 60* (31); Sikandar Raza 1/25 (3 overs)

Quetta Gladiators won by 5 wickets
Gaddafi Stadium, Lahore
Umpires: Aleem Dar (Pak) and Michael Gough (Eng)
Player of the match: Khawaja Nafay (Quetta Gladiators)

- Lahore Qalandars won the toss and elected to bat.

Match 8
22 February 2024
19:00 (D/N)
Scorecard

Islamabad United; 138/9 (20 overs)	v	Quetta Gladiators; 139/7 (18.2 overs)
Salman Ali Agha 33 (23); Abrar Ahmed 3/18 (4 overs)		Jason Roy 37 (18); Shadab Khan 2/24 (4 overs)

Quetta Gladiators won by 3 wickets
Gaddafi Stadium, Lahore
Umpires: Aleem Dar (Pak) and Richard Illingworth (Eng)
Player of the match: Rilee Rossouw (Quetta Gladiators)

- Quetta Gladiators won the toss and elected to field.

Match 11
25 February 2024
14:00
Scorecard

(H) Multan Sultans; 180/4 (20 overs)	v	Quetta Gladiators; 167/9 (20 overs)
Reeza Hendricks 72 (47); Mohammad Amir 2/46 (4 overs)		Khawaja Nafay 36 (31); Mohammad Ali 3/19 (4 overs)

Multan Sultans won by 13 runs
Multan Cricket Stadium, Multan
Umpires: Faisal Afridi (Pak) and Chris Gaffaney (NZ)
Player of the match: Mohammad Ali (Multan Sultans)

- Quetta Gladiators won the toss and elected to field.

Match 16
29 February 2024
19:00 (D/N)
Scorecard

(H) Karachi Kings; 165/8 (20 overs)	v	Quetta Gladiators; 169/5 (20 overs)
James Vince 37 (25); Abrar Ahmed 3/31 (4 overs)		Sherfane Rutherford 58* (31); Zahid Mahmood 2/17 (4 overs)

Quetta Gladiators won by 5 wickets
National Stadium, Karachi
Umpires: Chris Gaffaney (NZ) and Abdul Muqeet (Pak)
Player of the match: Sherfane Rutherford (Quetta Gladiators)

- Quetta Gladiators won the toss and elected to field.

Match 18
2 March 2024
19:00 (D/N)
Scorecard

(H) Islamabad United	v	Quetta Gladiators

Rawalpindi Cricket Stadium, Rawalpindi
Umpires: Richard Illingworth (Eng) and Asif Yaqoob (Pak)

- No toss.
- No play was possible due to rain.

Match 22
6 March 2024
14:00
Scorecard

Quetta Gladiators; 118 (19.1 overs)	v	Karachi Kings; 121/3 (15.3 overs)
Saud Shakeel 33 (28); Hasan Ali 4/15 (4 overs)		Tim Seifert 49 (31); Mohammad Amir 1/23 (2 overs)

Karachi Kings won by 7 wickets
Rawalpindi Cricket Stadium, Rawalpindi
Umpires: Richard Illingworth (Eng) and Asif Yaqoob (Pak)
Player of the match: Hasan Ali (Karachi Kings)

- Karachi Kings won the toss and elected to field.
- As a result of this match, Lahore Qalandars were eliminated from the tournament.

Match 25
8 March 2024
19:00 (D/N)
Scorecard

(H) Peshawar Zalmi; 196/8 (20 overs)	v	Quetta Gladiators; 120 (17.5 overs)
Babar Azam 53 (30); Akeal Hosein 4/23 (4 overs)		Saud Shakeel 24 (12); Khurram Shahzad 2/15 (2.5 overs)

Peshawar Zalmi won by 76 runs
Rawalpindi Cricket Stadium, Rawalpindi
Umpires: Alex Wharf (Eng) and Asif Yaqoob (Pak)
Player of the match: Saim Ayub (Peshawar Zalmi)

- Quetta Gladiators won the toss and elected to field.
- Akeal Hosein (Quetta Gladiators) took a hat-trick.
- As a result of this match, Peshawar Zalmi qualified for the playoffs.

Match 28
10 March 2024
19:00 (D/N)
Scorecard

Lahore Qalandars; 166/4 (20 overs)	v	Quetta Gladiators; 169/4 (20 overs)
Abdullah Shafique 59* (39); Abrar Ahmed 2/31 (4 overs)		Saud Shakeel 88* (65); Jahandad Khan 2/30 (4 overs)

Quetta Gladiators won by 6 wickets
National Stadium, Karachi
Umpires: Chris Gaffaney (NZ) and Rashid Riaz (Pak)
Player of the match: Saud Shakeel (Quetta Gladiators)

- Lahore Qalandars won the toss and elected to bat.
- As a result of this match, Quetta Gladiators qualified for the playoffs and Karachi Kings were eliminated from the tournament.

Match 30
12 March 2024
21:00 (D/N)
Scorecard

Multan Sultans; 185/4 (20 overs)	v	Quetta Gladiators; 106 (15.5 overs)
Mohammad Rizwan 69 (47); Mohammad Amir 2/40 (4 overs)		Omair Yousuf 37 (25); David Willey 3/22 (4 overs)

Multan Sultans won by 79 runs
National Stadium, Karachi
Umpires: Richard Illingworth (Eng) and Rashid Riaz (Pak)
Player of the match: Mohammad Rizwan (Multan Sultans)

- Quetta Gladiators won the toss and elected to field.

== Playoffs ==
=== Eliminator 1 ===
Match 32
15 March 2024
21:00 (N)
Scorecard

Islamabad United; 174/9 (20 overs)	v	Quetta Gladiators; 135 (18.4 overs)
Martin Guptill 56 (47); Mohammad Amir 2/20 (4 overs)		Omair Yousuf 50 (37); Imad Wasim 3/12 (4 overs)

Islamabad United won by 39 runs
National Stadium, Karachi
Umpires: Chris Gaffaney (NZ) and Ahsan Raza (Pak)
Player of the match: Imad Wasim (Islamabad United)

- Islamabad United won the toss and elected to bat.

== Statistics ==
=== Most runs ===
Player	Inns	Runs	Ave	HS	50s	100s
Saud Shakeel	10	323	35.88	88*	2	0
Jason Roy	10	253	25.30	75	2	0
Khawaja Nafay	10	182	22.75	60*	1	0
Sherfane Rutherford	6	151	30.20	58*	1	0
Rilee Rossouw	10	148	16.44	34*	0	0

- Source: ESPNcricinfo

=== Most wickets ===
Player	Inns	Wkts	Ave	BBI
Abrar Ahmed	10	16	19.56	3/18
Akeal Hosein	10	15	20.53	4/23
Mohammad Amir	9	10	28.60	2/20
Mohammad Wasim	8	9	33.00	3/20
Mohammad Hasnain	5	4	50.50	2/50

- Source: ESPNcricinfo
