= 2024 Multan Sultans season =

2024 season of Multan Sultans

Multan Sultans
2024 season
- Coach: Abdul Rehman
- Captain: Mohammad Rizwan
- Ground(s): Multan Cricket Stadium
- PSL 2024: Runner-up
- Most runs: Usman Khan (430)
- Most wickets: Usama Mir (24)

Multan Sultans is a franchise cricket team that represents Multan in the Pakistan Super League (PSL). They were one of the six teams competing in the 2024 Pakistan Super League. The team was coached by Abdul Rehman, and captained by Mohammad Rizwan.

== Squad ==
- Players with international caps are listed in **bold**.
- Ages are given as of 17 February 2024, the date of the first match in the tournament.

No.	Name	Nationality	Birth date	Category	Batting style	Bowling style	Year signed	Notes
Batsmen
13	Usman Khan	United Arab Emirates	10 May 1995 (aged 28)	Silver	Right-handed	—	2023	
17	**Reeza Hendricks**	South Africa	14 August 1989 (aged 34)	Gold	Right-handed	Right-arm off break	2024	
18	Yasir Khan	Pakistan	13 April 2002 (aged 21)	Emerging	Right-handed	—	2024	
25	**Johnson Charles**	West Indies	14 January 1989 (age 37)	Supplementary	Right-handed	Left-arm orthodox	2021	
29	**Dawid Malan**	England	3 September 1987 (aged 36)	Diamond	Left-handed	Right-arm leg break	2024	
96	**Tayyab Tahir**	Pakistan	26 July 1993 (aged 30)	Silver	Right-handed	Right-arm leg break	2024	
All-rounders
23	**David Willey**	England	28 February 1990 (aged 33)	Platinum	Left-handed	Left-arm fast-medium	2024	Vice-captain
27	Mohammad Shehzad	Pakistan	5 February 2004 (aged 20)	Supplementary	Right-handed	Right-arm medium-fast	2024	
55	**Abbas Afridi**	Pakistan	5 April 2001 (aged 22)	Gold	Right-handed	Right-arm medium-fast	2022	
72	**Khushdil Shah**	Pakistan	7 February 1995 (aged 29)	Diamond	Left-handed	Left-arm orthodox	2020	
95	**Iftikhar Ahmed**	Pakistan	3 September 1990 (aged 33)	Platinum	Right-handed	Right-arm off break	2024	
97	Faisal Akram	Pakistan	20 August 2003 (aged 20)	Emerging	Left-handed	Left-arm unorthodox	2024	
Wicket-keepers
16	**Mohammad Rizwan**	Pakistan	1 June 1992 (aged 31)	Platinum	Right-handed	—	2021	Captain
Bowlers
5	Ali Majid	Pakistan	29 December 1991 (aged 32)	—N/a	Right-handed	Right-arm off break	2024	Full replacement for Ihsanullah
14	**Mohammad Ali**	Pakistan	1 November 1992 (aged 31)	Silver	Right-handed	Right-arm medium-fast	2024	
24	**Usama Mir**	Pakistan	23 December 1995 (aged 28)	Diamond	Right-handed	Right-arm leg break	2023	
26	**Olly Stone**	England	9 October 1993 (aged 30)	—N/a	Right-handed	Right-arm fast	2024	Partial replacement for Reece Topley
28	**Shahnawaz Dahani**	Pakistan	5 August 1998 (aged 25)	Silver	Right-handed	Right-arm medium-fast	2021	
34	**Chris Jordan**	England	4 October 1988 (aged 35)	Supplementary	Right-handed	Right-arm fast-medium	2024	
38	**Reece Topley**	England	21 February 1994 (aged 29)	Gold	Right-handed	Left-arm fast-medium	2024	
39	**Richard Ngarava**	Zimbabwe	29 December 1997 (aged 26)	—N/a	Left-handed	Left-arm fast-medium	2024	Full replacement for Olly Stone
50	**Ihsanullah**	Pakistan	11 October 2002 (aged 21)	Silver	Right-handed	Right-arm medium-fast	2022	
83	Aftab Ibrahim	Pakistan	15 April 2004 (aged 19)	Supplementary	Right-handed	Right-arm medium-fast	2024	

- Source: ESPNcricinfo

== Administration and coaching staff ==
Position	Name
Manager	Hijab Zahid
Head coach	Abdul Rehman
Assistant and development coach	Mohammad Wasim
Fast bowling coach	Catherine Dalton
Spin bowling coach	David Parsons
Fielding and strength and conditioning coach	Drikus Saaiman
Assistant spin bowling coach	Alex Hartley
Director of Strategy	Nathan Leamon
Physiotherapist	Javed Mughal

== Kit manufacturers and sponsors ==
Kit manufacturer	Shirt sponsor (chest)	Shirt sponsor (back)	Chest branding	Sleeve branding
Gym Armour	Pepsi	Fatima Group	Moiz Steel	Asia Ghee, KFC

Home kit

Away kit

== Season standings ==
=== Points table ===
Pos	Team	Pld	W	L	NR	Pts	NRR
1	Multan Sultans (R)	10	7	3	0	14	1.150
2	Peshawar Zalmi (3rd)	10	6	3	1	13	0.147
3	Islamabad United (C)	10	5	4	1	11	0.224
4	Quetta Gladiators (4th)	10	5	4	1	11	−0.921
5	Karachi Kings	10	4	6	0	8	−0.192
6	Lahore Qalandars	10	1	8	1	3	−0.554

Source: ESPNcricinfo

The four top-ranked teams qualified for the Playoffs.
Advanced to Qualifier
Advanced to Eliminator 1

Notes

- C = Champions;
- R = Runner-up;
- (x) = Position at the end of the tournament;

== Group fixtures ==
Match 3
18 February 2024
19:00 (D/N)
Scorecard

(H) Multan Sultans; 185/2 (20 overs)	v	Karachi Kings; 130/8 (20 overs)
Reeza Hendricks 79* (54); Mir Hamza 1/30 (4 overs)		Shoaib Malik 53 (35); Mohammad Ali 3/23 (4 overs)

Multan Sultans won by 55 runs
Multan Cricket Stadium, Multan
Umpires: Chris Gaffaney (NZ) and Rashid Riaz (Pak)
Player of the match: Reeza Hendricks (Multan Sultans)

- Karachi Kings won the toss and elected to field.
- Saad Baig (Karachi Kings) made his T20 debut.

Match 5
20 February 2024
19:00 (D/N)
Scorecard

Islamabad United; 144 (20 overs)	v	(H) Multan Sultans; 145/5 (19.5 overs)
Salman Ali Agha 52 (43); Mohammad Ali 3/19 (4 overs)		Reeza Hendricks 58 (46); Naseem Shah 2/27 (4 overs)

Multan Sultans won by 5 wickets
Multan Cricket Stadium, Multan
Umpires: Faisal Afridi (Pak) and Chris Gaffaney (NZ)
Player of the match: Mohammad Ali (Multan Sultans)

- Multan Sultans won the toss and elected to field.

Match 7
21 February 2024
19:00 (D/N)
Scorecard

Lahore Qalandars; 166/5 (20 overs)	v	(H) Multan Sultans; 170/5 (19 overs)
Rassie van der Dussen 54 (37); Mohammad Ali 2/28 (4 overs)		Mohammad Rizwan 82 (59); Shaheen Afridi 2/25 (4 overs)

Multan Sultans won by 5 wickets
Multan Cricket Stadium, Multan
Umpires: Chris Gaffaney (NZ) and Rashid Riaz (Pak)
Player of the match: Mohammad Rizwan (Multan Sultans)

- Lahore Qalandars won the toss and elected to bat

Match 9
23 February 2024
19:00 (D/N)
Scorecard

Peshawar Zalmi; 179/8 (20 overs)	v	Multan Sultans; 174 (20 overs)
Haseebullah Khan 37 (18); Mohammad Ali 2/23 (4 overs)		Dawid Malan 52 (25); Arif Yaqoob 3/43 (4 overs)

Peshawar Zalmi won by 5 runs
Multan Cricket Stadium, Multan
Umpires: Faisal Afridi (Pak) and Chris Gaffaney (NZ)
Player of the match: Luke Wood (Peshawar Zalmi)

- Peshawar Zalmi won the toss and elected to bat.

Match 11
25 February 2024
14:00
Scorecard

(H) Multan Sultans; 180/4 (20 overs)	v	Quetta Gladiators; 167/9 (20 overs)
Reeza Hendricks 72 (47); Mohammad Amir 2/46 (4 overs)		Khawaja Nafay 36 (31); Mohammad Ali 3/19 (4 overs)

Multan Sultans won by 13 runs
Multan Cricket Stadium, Multan
Umpires: Faisal Afridi (Pak) and Chris Gaffaney (NZ)
Player of the match: Mohammad Ali (Multan Sultans)

- Quetta Gladiators won the toss and elected to field.

Match 14
27 February 2024
19:00 (D/N)
Scorecard

Multan Sultans; 214/4 (20 overs)	v	(H) Lahore Qalandars; 154 (17 overs)
Usman Khan 96 (55); Shaheen Afridi 2/39 (4 overs)		Sahibzada Farhan 31 (21); Usama Mir 6/40 (4 overs)

Multan Sultans won by 60 runs
Gaddafi Stadium, Lahore
Umpires: Ruchira Palliyaguruge (SL) and Ahsan Raza (Pak)
Player of the match: Usman Khan (Multan Sultans)

- Multan Sultans won the toss and elected to bat.

Match 19
3 March 2024
19:00 (D/N)
Scorecard

Multan Sultans; 189/3 (20 overs)	v	(H) Karachi Kings; 169/7 (20 overs)
Usman Khan 106* (59); Blessing Muzarabani 2/32 (4 overs)		Shoaib Malik 38 (28); Usama Mir 2/29 (4 overs)

Multan Sultans won by 20 runs
National Stadium, Karachi
Umpires: Faisal Afridi (Pak) and Chris Gaffaney (NZ)
Player of the match: Usman Khan (Multan Sultans)

- Multan Sultans won the toss and elected to bat.
- As a result of this match, Multan Sultans qualified for the playoffs.

Match 21
5 March 2024
19:00 (D/N)
Scorecard

Peshawar Zalmi; 204/5 (20 overs)	v	Multan Sultans; 200/5 (20 overs)
Babar Azam 64 (40); Usama Mir 3/32 (4 overs)		Iftikhar Ahmed 60* (27); Aamer Jamal 2/36 (4 overs)

Peshawar Zalmi won by 4 runs
Rawalpindi Cricket Stadium, Rawalpindi
Umpires: Richard Illingworth (Eng) and Alex Wharf (Eng)
Player of the match: Babar Azam (Peshawar Zalmi)

- Peshawar Zalmi won the toss and elected to bat.

Match 27
10 March 2024
14:00
Scorecard

Multan Sultans; 228/4 (20 overs)	v	(H) Islamabad United; 232/7 (20 overs)
Usman Khan 100* (50); Faheem Ashraf 2/32 (3 overs)		Colin Munro 84 (40); Abbas Afridi 3/40 (4 overs)

Islamabad United won by 3 wickets
Rawalpindi Cricket Stadium, Rawalpindi
Umpires: Mohammad Asif (Pak) and Ruchira Palliyaguruge (SL)
Player of the match: Colin Munro (Islamabad United)

- Islamabad United won the toss and elected to field.
- As a result of this match, Islamabad United qualified for the playoffs.

Match 30
12 March 2024
21:00 (D/N)
Scorecard

Multan Sultans; 185/4 (20 overs)	v	Quetta Gladiators; 106 (15.5 overs)
Mohammad Rizwan 69 (47); Mohammad Amir 2/40 (4 overs)		Omair Yousuf 37 (25); David Willey 3/22 (4 overs)

Multan Sultans won by 79 runs
National Stadium, Karachi
Umpires: Richard Illingworth (Eng) and Rashid Riaz (Pak)
Player of the match: Mohammad Rizwan (Multan Sultans)

- Quetta Gladiators won the toss and elected to field.

== Playoffs ==
=== Qualifier ===
Match 31
14 March 2024
21:00 (N)
Scorecard

Peshawar Zalmi; 146/7 (20 overs)	v	Multan Sultans; 147/3 (18.3 overs)
Babar Azam 46 (42); Usama Mir 2/16 (4 overs)		Yasir Khan 54 (37); Aamer Jamal 1/23 (3 overs)

Multan Sultans won by 7 wickets
National Stadium, Karachi
Umpires: Aleem Dar (Pak) and Richard Illingworth (Eng)
Player of the match: Usama Mir (Multan Sultans)

- Peshawar Zalmi won the toss and elected to bat.

=== Final ===
Match 34
18 March 2024
21:00 (N)
Scorecard

Multan Sultans; 159/9 (20 overs)	v	Islamabad United; 163/8 (20 overs)
Usman Khan 57 (40); Imad Wasim 5/23 (4 overs)		Martin Guptill 50 (32); Iftikhar Ahmed 2/19 (3 overs)

Islamabad United won by 2 wickets
National Stadium, Karachi
Umpires: Chris Gaffaney (NZ) and Richard Illingworth (Eng)
Player of the match: Imad Wasim (Islamabad United)

- Multan Sultans won the toss and elected to bat.
- By winning in the final, Islamabad United became the most successful team in PSL history.

== Statistics ==
=== Most runs ===
Player	Inns	Runs	Ave	HS	50s	100s
Usman Khan	7	430	107.50	106*	2	2
Mohammad Rizwan	12	407	33.91	82	4	0
Reeza Hendricks	8	304	43.42	79*	3	0
Iftikhar Ahmed	11	259	64.75	60*	1	0
Yasir Khan	7	164	23.42	54	1	0

- Source: ESPNcricinfo

=== Most wickets ===
Player	Inns	Wkts	Ave	BBI
Usama Mir	12	24	15.87	6/40
Mohammad Ali	12	19	18.63	3/19
David Willey	11	15	20.40	3/22
Abbas Afridi	9	13	19.07	3/33
Chris Jordan	6	6	29.50	2/28

- Source: ESPNcricinfo
