= 2024 Peshawar Zalmi season =

2024 season of Peshawar Zalmi

Peshawar Zalmi
2024 season
- Coach: Daren Sammy
- Captain: Babar Azam
- PSL 2024: Playoffs (3rd)
- Most runs: Babar Azam (569)
- Most wickets: Luke Wood (12)

Peshawar Zalmi is a franchise cricket team that represents Peshawar in the Pakistan Super League (PSL). They were one of the six teams competing in the 2024 Pakistan Super League and placed third for a second consecutive season. The team was coached by Daren Sammy, and captained by Babar Azam.

== Squad ==
- Players with international caps are listed in **bold**.
- Ages are given as of 17 February 2024, the date of the first match in the tournament.

| No. | Name | Nationality | Birth date | Category | Batting style | Bowling style | Year signed | Notes |
Batsmen
| 6 | **Saim Ayub** | Pakistan | 24 May 2002 (aged 21) | Diamond | Left-handed | Right-arm medium fast | 2023 | |
| 32 | Tom Kohler-Cadmore | England | 19 August 1994 (aged 29) | Diamond | Right-handed | Right-arm off break | 2021 | |
| 45 | **Asif Ali** | Pakistan | 1 October 1991 (aged 32) | Diamond | Right-handed | Right-arm off break | 2024 | |
| 52 | **Rovman Powell** | West Indies | 23 July 1993 (aged 30) | Platinum | Right-handed | Right-arm fast medium | 2023 | |
| 56 | **Babar Azam** | Pakistan | 15 October 1994 (aged 29) | Platinum | Right-handed | Right-arm off break | 2023 | Captain |
| 80 | Dan Mousley | England | 8 July 2001 (aged 22) | Silver | Left-handed | Left-arm orthodox | 2024 | |
All-rounders
| 20 | Paul Walter | England | 28 May 1994 (aged 29) | — | Left-handed | Left-arm medium-fast | 2024 | Full replacement for Sufiyan Muqeem |
| 23 | **Hussain Talat** | Pakistan | 12 February 1996 (aged 28) | — | Left-handed | Right-arm medium-fast | 2024 | Full replacement for Waqar Salamkheil |
| 65 | **Aamir Jamal** | Pakistan | 5 July 1996 (aged 27) | Gold | Right-handed | Right-arm fast | 2023 | |
Wicket-keepers
| 13 | **Haseebullah Khan** | Pakistan | 20 March 2003 (aged 20) | Emerging | Left-handed | — | 2023 | |
| 29 | **Mohammad Haris** | Pakistan | 30 March 2001 (aged 22) | Gold | Right-handed | Right-arm off break | 2022 | |
Bowlers
| 4 | **Waqar Salamkheil** | Afghanistan | 2 October 2001 (aged 22) | — | Right-handed | Left-arm unorthodox | 2024 | Full replacement for Lungi Ngidi |
| 8 | **Khurram Shahzad** | Pakistan | 25 November 1999 (aged 24) | Silver | Right-handed | Right-arm medium | 2023 | |
| 11 | Mehran Mumtaz | Pakistan | 7 April 2003 (aged 20) | Supplementary | Left-handed | Left-arm orthodox | 2024 | |
| 14 | **Luke Wood** | England | 2 August 1995 (aged 28) | Supplementary | Left-handed | Left-arm fast-medium | 2024 | |
| 15 | **Noor Ahmad** | Afghanistan | 3 January 2005 (aged 19) | Platinum | Left-handed | Left-arm unorthodox | 2024 | |
| 22 | Mohammad Zeeshan | Pakistan | 15 April 2006 (aged 17) | Emerging | Right-handed | Right-arm medium-fast | 2024 | |
| 35 | **Arshad Iqbal** | Pakistan | 26 December 2000 (aged 23) | — | Right-handed | Right-arm medium-fast | 2022 | Partial replacement for Khurram Shahzad |
| 37 | **Gus Atkinson** | England | 19 January 1998 (aged 26) | — | Right-handed | Right-arm fast | 2024 | Full replacement for Noor Ahmad |
| 70 | **Shamar Joseph** | West Indies | 31 August 1999 (aged 24) | — | Left-handed | Right-arm fast | 2024 | Partial replacement for Gus Atkinson |
| 71 | Umair Afridi | Pakistan | 10 July 1997 (aged 26) | Silver | Left-handed | Left-arm medium-fast | 2024 | |
| 78 | **Naveen-ul-Haq** | Afghanistan | 23 September 1999 (aged 24) | Gold | Right-handed | Right-arm medium-fast | 2024 | |
| 82 | Sufiyan Muqeem | Pakistan | 15 November 1999 (aged 24) | Supplementary | Left-handed | Left-arm unorthodox | 2023 | |
| 97 | Aimal Khan | Pakistan | 17 October 2004 (aged 19) | — | Right-handed | Right-arm fast | 2024 | Partial replacement for Naveen-ul-Haq |
| 99 | Salman Irshad | Pakistan | 3 December 1995 (aged 28) | Silver | Right-handed | Right-arm fast-medium | 2022 | |
| 139 | Arif Yaqoob | Pakistan | 25 October 1994 (aged 29) | Silver | Right-handed | Right-arm leg break | 2024 | |
| N/A | **Lungi Ngidi** | South Africa | 29 March 1996 (aged 27) | Supplementary | Right-handed | Right-arm fast-medium | 2024 | |

- Source: ESPNcricinfo

== Administration and coaching staff ==
| Name | Position |
|---|---|
| Inzamam-ul-Haq | President |
| Daren Sammy | Head coach |
| Mohammad Akram | Director of cricket and bowling coach |
| Mohammad Yousuf | Batting consultant |
| Umar Gul | Bowling consultant |
| Zafar Iqbal | Medical advisor |
| Mian Abbas Layaq | COO |

== Kit manufacturers and sponsors ==
| Kit manufacturer | Shirt sponsor (chest) | Shirt sponsor (back) | Chest branding | Sleeve branding |
|---|---|---|---|---|
| Gym Armour | Haier | Ufone | Huawei | Bank Makramah Limited, Dany Technologies, TCL |

Home kit

Away kit

== Season standings ==
=== Points table ===
| Pos | Team | Pld | W | L | NR | Pts | NRR |
|---|---|---|---|---|---|---|---|
| 1 | Multan Sultans (R) | 10 | 7 | 3 | 0 | 14 | 1.150 |
| 2 | Peshawar Zalmi (3rd) | 10 | 6 | 3 | 1 | 13 | 0.147 |
| 3 | Islamabad United (C) | 10 | 5 | 4 | 1 | 11 | 0.224 |
| 4 | Quetta Gladiators (4th) | 10 | 5 | 4 | 1 | 11 | −0.921 |
| 5 | Karachi Kings | 10 | 4 | 6 | 0 | 8 | −0.192 |
| 6 | Lahore Qalandars | 10 | 1 | 8 | 1 | 3 | −0.554 |

Source: ESPNcricinfo

The four top-ranked teams qualified for the Playoffs.
Advanced to Qualifier
Advanced to Eliminator 1

Notes

- C = Champions;
- R = Runner-up;
- (x) = Position at the end of the tournament;

== Group fixtures ==
Match 2
18 February 2024
14:00
Scorecard

| Quetta Gladiators; 206/5 (20 overs) | v | Peshawar Zalmi; 190/6 (20 overs) |
| Jason Roy 75 (48); Salman Irshad 3/38 (4 overs) | | Babar Azam 68 (42); Abrar Ahmed 2/29 (4 overs) |

Quetta Gladiators won by 16 runs
Gaddafi Stadium, Lahore
Umpires: Michael Gough (Eng) and Tariq Rasheed (Pak)
Player of the match: Saud Shakeel (Quetta Gladiators)

- Peshawar Zalmi won the toss and elected to field.
- Mohammad Zeeshan (Peshawar Zalmi) made his T20 debut.

Match 6
21 February 2024
14:00
Scorecard

| Peshawar Zalmi; 154 (19.5 overs) | v | Karachi Kings; 157/3 (16.5 overs) |
| Babar Azam 72 (51); Mir Hamza 3/28 (4 overs) | | Kieron Pollard 49* (21); Luke Wood 2/20 (3.5 overs) |

Karachi Kings won by 7 wickets
Gaddafi Stadium, Lahore
Umpires: Michael Gough (Eng) and Ahsan Raza (Pak)
Player of the match: Mir Hamza (Karachi Kings)

- Karachi Kings won the toss and elected to field.

Match 9
23 February 2024
19:00 (D/N)
Scorecard

| Peshawar Zalmi; 179/8 (20 overs) | v | (H) Multan Sultans; 174 (20 overs) |
| Haseebullah Khan 37 (18); Mohammad Ali 2/23 (4 overs) | | Dawid Malan 52 (25); Arif Yaqoob 3/43 (4 overs) |

Peshawar Zalmi won by 5 runs
Multan Cricket Stadium, Multan
Umpires: Faisal Afridi (Pak) and Chris Gaffaney (NZ)
Player of the match: Luke Wood (Peshawar Zalmi)

- Peshawar Zalmi won the toss and elected to bat.

Match 12
25 February 2024
19:00 (D/N)
Scorecard

| Peshawar Zalmi; 211/4 (20 overs) | v | (H) Lahore Qalandars; 203/6 (20 overs) |
| Saim Ayub 88 (55); Shaheen Afridi 3/33 (4 overs) | | Rassie van der Dussen 104* (52); Naveen-ul-Haq 2/50 (4 overs) |

Peshawar Zalmi won by 8 runs
Gaddafi Stadium, Lahore
Umpires: Richard Illingworth (Eng) and Ahsan Raza (Pak)
Player of the match: Saim Ayub (Peshawar Zalmi)

- Lahore Qalandars won the toss and elected to field.

Match 13
26 February 2024
19:00 (D/N)
Scorecard

| Peshawar Zalmi; 201/5 (20 overs) | v | Islamabad United; 193/9 (20 overs) |
| Babar Azam 111* (63); Shadab Khan 2/28 (4 overs) | | Azam Khan 75 (30); Arif Yaqoob 5/27 (4 overs) |

Peshawar Zalmi won by 8 runs
Gaddafi Stadium, Lahore
Umpires: Richard Illingworth (Eng) and Shozab Raza (Pak)
Player of the match: Babar Azam (Peshawar Zalmi)

- Islamabad United won the toss and elected to field.

Match 17
2 March 2024
14:00
Scorecard

| Peshawar Zalmi | v | Lahore Qalandars |

Rawalpindi Cricket Stadium, Rawalpindi
Umpires: Ruchira Palliyaguruge (SL) and Ahsan Raza (Pak)

- No toss.
- No play was possible due to rain.

Match 20
4 March 2024
19:00 (D/N)
Scorecard

| (H) Islamabad United; 196/4 (20 overs) | v | Peshawar Zalmi; 167/9 (20 overs) |
| Shadab Khan 80 (51); Saim Ayub 2/15 (2 overs) | | Aamer Jamal 87 (49); Shadab Khan 3/41 (4 overs) |

Islamabad United won by 29 runs
Rawalpindi Cricket Stadium, Rawalpindi
Umpires: Richard Illingworth (Eng) and Asif Yaqoob (Pak)
Player of the match: Shadab Khan (Islamabad United)

- Peshawar Zalmi won the toss and elected to field.

Match 21
5 March 2024
19:00 (D/N)
Scorecard

| Peshawar Zalmi; 204/5 (20 overs) | v | Multan Sultans; 200/5 (20 overs) |
| Babar Azam 64 (40); Usama Mir 3/32 (4 overs) | | Iftikhar Ahmed 60* (27); Aamer Jamal 2/36 (4 overs) |

Peshawar Zalmi won by 4 runs
Rawalpindi Cricket Stadium, Rawalpindi
Umpires: Richard Illingworth (Eng) and Alex Wharf (Eng)
Player of the match: Babar Azam (Peshawar Zalmi)

- Peshawar Zalmi won the toss and elected to bat.

Match 25
8 March 2024
19:00 (D/N)
Scorecard

| (H) Peshawar Zalmi; 196/8 (20 overs) | v | Quetta Gladiators; 120 (17.5 overs) |
| Babar Azam 53 (30); Akeal Hosein 4/23 (4 overs) | | Saud Shakeel 24 (12); Khurram Shahzad 2/15 (2.5 overs) |

Peshawar Zalmi won by 76 runs
Rawalpindi Cricket Stadium, Rawalpindi
Umpires: Alex Wharf (Eng) and Asif Yaqoob (Pak)
Player of the match: Saim Ayub (Peshawar Zalmi)

- Quetta Gladiators won the toss and elected to field.
- Akeal Hosein (Quetta Gladiators) took a hat-trick.
- As a result of this match, Peshawar Zalmi qualified for the playoffs.

Match 29
11 March 2024
21:00 (D/N)
Scorecard

| Peshawar Zalmi; 147/6 (20 overs) | v | (H) Karachi Kings; 145/5 (20 overs) |
| Babar Azam 51 (46); Arafat Minhas 1/11 (4 overs) | | Tim Seifert 41 (30); Naveen-ul-Haq 2/22 (4 overs) |

Peshawar Zalmi won by 2 runs
National Stadium, Karachi
Umpires: Faisal Afridi (Pak) and Alex Wharf (Eng)
Player of the match: Babar Azam (Peshawar Zalmi)

- Peshawar Zalmi won the toss and elected to bat.

== Playoffs ==
=== Qualifier ===
Match 31
14 March 2024
21:00 (N)
Scorecard

| Peshawar Zalmi; 146/7 (20 overs) | v | Multan Sultans; 147/3 (18.3 overs) |
| Babar Azam 46 (42); Usama Mir 2/16 (4 overs) | | Yasir Khan 54 (37); Aamer Jamal 1/23 (3 overs) |

Multan Sultans won by 7 wickets
National Stadium, Karachi
Umpires: Aleem Dar (Pak) and Richard Illingworth (Eng)
Player of the match: Usama Mir (Multan Sultans)

- Peshawar Zalmi won the toss and elected to bat.

=== Eliminator 2 ===
Match 33
16 March 2024
21:00 (N)
Scorecard

| Peshawar Zalmi; 185/5 (20 overs) | v | Islamabad United; 189/5 (19 overs) |
| Saim Ayub 73 (44); Naseem Shah 3/30 (4 overs) | | Imad Wasim 59* (40); Saim Ayub 2/34 (3 overs) |

Islamabad United won by 5 wickets
National Stadium, Karachi
Umpires: Richard Illingworth (Eng) and Asif Yaqoob (Pak)
Player of the match: Imad Wasim (Islamabad United)

- Islamabad United won the toss and elected to field.

== Statistics ==
=== Most runs ===
| Player | Inns | Runs | Ave | HS | 50s | 100s |
|---|---|---|---|---|---|---|
| Babar Azam | 11 | 569 | 56.90 | 111* | 5 | 1 |
| Saim Ayub | 11 | 345 | 31.36 | 88 | 2 | 0 |
| Rovman Powell | 11 | 228 | 25.33 | 46 | 0 | 0 |
| Mohammad Haris | 10 | 142 | 15.77 | 40 | 0 | 0 |
| Aamir Jamal | 8 | 138 | 34.50 | 87 | 1 | 0 |

- Source: ESPNcricinfo

=== Most wickets ===
| Player | Inns | Wkts | Ave | BBI |
|---|---|---|---|---|
| Luke Wood | 11 | 12 | 29.08 | 2/13 |
| Naveen-ul-Haq | 6 | 9 | 23.77 | 2/22 |
| Salman Irshad | 8 | 9 | 33.44 | 3/38 |
| Arif Yaqoob | 5 | 8 | 17.75 | 5/27 |
| Saim Ayub | 9 | 8 | 22.37 | 2/15 |

- Source: ESPNcricinfo
