= 2023–24 National T20 Cup =

Cricket tournament in Pakistan

- Dates: 24 November – 10 December 2023
- Administrator: Pakistan Cricket Board
- Cricket format: Twenty20
- Tournament format(s): Group stage and knockout
- Host: Pakistan
- Champions: Karachi Whites (2nd title)
- Runners-up: Abbottabad
- Participants: 18
- Matches: 63
- Player of the series: Iftikhar Ahmed (395 runs and 18 wickets)
- Most runs: Sahibzada Farhan (492 runs)
- Most wickets: Shahab Khan (25 wickets)
- Official website: National T20 Cup

The 2023–24 National T20 Cup was a Twenty20 domestic cricket competition played in Pakistan. It was the 20th season of the National T20 Cup, with the tournament starting from 24 November 2023 and the final being played on 10 December 2023. Sindh were the defending champions, winning the 2022-23 edition.

== Overview ==
National T20 2023-24 began from 24 November and lasted until 10 December. 18 teams took part in the tournament which was played across four venues – National Bank Stadium, UBL Sports Complex, HPC Oval Ground and NBP Sports Complex – in Karachi.

=== Broadcasting ===
All matches played at National Bank Stadium were broadcast on PTV Sports and ARY ZAP in Pakistan, and live-streamed on YouTube in overseas territories. Double-header matches at National Bank Stadium began at 15:00 PKT and 20:00 PKT, with toss conducted at 14:30 PKT and 19:30 PKT respectively.

=== Free Entry ===
The Pakistan Cricket Board (PCB) announced free entry for spectators for all matches being played at National Bank Stadium. The Hanif Mohammad, Javed Miandad and Fazal Mahmood enclosures were accessible for spectators.

The 63-match tournament was structured to open with group stage games, which were to be followed by Super Eight matches. A total of 32 group stage matches were played from 24 to 28 November. 18 participating teams were put in four groups.

=== Teams Meetup ===
The first set of fixtures saw Lahore Whites face Larkana and Karachi Blues face Peshawar at NBP Sports Complex in Group A. In Group B, Karachi Whites played against Islamabad and Hyderabad played against DM Jamali at UBL Sports Complex. Rawalpindi took on Abbottabad and Faisalabad faced Bahawalpur at National Bank Stadium for Group C and lastly, for group D, HPC Oval Ground hosted the Multan-Sialkot clash and FATA-AJK game.

=== Super 8 Stage ===
The top two teams from each group progressed to the Super Eight stage, which was played in a round-robin format from 1 to 8 December.

=== Final ===
Following the Super Eight stage, the top four teams qualified for the semi-finals. Both semi-finals were played on 9 December at National Bank Stadium, at 15:00 PKT and 20:00 PKT respectively. The final was played at the same venue on 10 December. The toss took place at 19:30 PKT and the first ball was bowled at 20:00 PKT.

Karachi Whites won the 2023–24 National T20 Cup by defeating Abbottabad by nine runs in the final. The match was held at National Bank Stadium, Karachi.

== Background ==
This was the first edition of the tournament played since the PCB 2014 Constitution was reinstated. The previous edition of National T20, which featured six sides, was won by Sindh who clinched their maiden title after defeating defending champions Khyber Pakhtunkhwa by eight wickets. Khyber Pakhtunkhwa lost out on securing a hat-trick of titles after winning both the 2020-21 and 2021-22 editions.

== Format ==
The 18 qualifying teams were divided into four groups (with Group A and Group B consisting of five teams and Group C and Group D consisting of four teams), with the top two teams in each group advancing to the Super 8 round. In this stage, the qualifying teams were split into one group of 8. The top four teams in the Super 8 qualified for the knockout stage, which consisted of two semi-finals and a final.

== Teams ==
Group A	Group B	Group C	Group D
Karachi Blues; Lahore Whites; Larkana; Peshawar; Quetta	Hyderabad; Dera Murad Jamali; Islamabad; Karachi Whites; Lahore Blues	Abbottabad; Bahawalpur; Faisalabad; Rawalpindi	Azad Jammu & Kashmir; FATA; Multan; Sialkot

== Squads ==
=== Group A ===
Karachi Blues	Lahore Whites	Larkana	Peshawar	Quetta
Saifullah Bangash (c & †); Jahanzaib Sultan; Mohammad Taha; Kashif Ali; Hasan Mohsin; Saqib Khan; Arish Ali Khan; Afnan Khan; Bahadur Ali; Abdur Rehman; Mohammad Asghar; Rumman Raees; Fazal Subhan; Syed Waleed Azeem; Arbaz Khan	Saad Nasim (c); Ahmed Shehzad; Tayyab Tahir; Ali Zaryab; Muhammad Akhlaq (†); Saad Khan; Umar Akmal; Ahmed Bashir; Ahmed Daniyal; Mohammad Amir Khan; Mohammad Naveed; Muneeb Wasif; Mohammad Irfan; Mohammad Ramiz Jnr; Kamran Afzal	Zahid Mehmood (c); Umar Khalid; Israr-ul-Haq; Mohammad Aqeel; Ghulam Raza; Mohsin Ali; Mohsin Raza (†); Sabit Ali; Mushtaq Ahmed; Imtiaz Ali; Asif Ali Jnr; Ali Haider; Faraz Aziz; Ali Asghar; Mehrooz Ali; Mohammad Umar	Iftikhar Ahmed (c); Sahibzada Farhan; Adil Amin; Israrullah; Maaz Ahmad Sadaqat; Nabi Gul; Aamer Azmat; Imran Khan; Mohammad Imran; Mohammad Ilyas; Abbas Afridi; Niaz Khan; Sajid Khan; Usman Tariq; Azam Khan; Mohammad Haris (†)	Jalat Khan (c); Bismillah Khan (†); Abdul Bangalzai; Gohar Faiz; Abdul Hanan; Najeebullah; Syed Zainullah; Mohammad Javed; Nadeem Ahmed; Salahuddin; Obaid Ullah; Sanaullah; Faheem Rasheed; Bakhtiar Shah; Bohir Aman

=== Group B ===
Dera Murad Jamali	Hyderabad	Islamabad	Karachi Whites	Lahore Blues
Nasir Khan (c); Basit Ali; Usama Khalil; Zubair Khan Mengal; Mohammad Deen; Mohammad Ayaz; Abdul Rauf; Shoaib Ahmed (†); Fahad Hussain; Hidayatullah; Saleem Mal; Zahoor Ahmed; Mohammad Shahid; Mohammad Ikram; Aftab Ahmed	Rizwan Mehmood (c); Mohammad Suleman; Salman Khan; Tayyab Ali Shah; Daniyal Hussain Rajput; Fardeen Sheikh; Rao Sajid; Akbar Khan (†); Mustafa Nasir; Asim Jutt; Jawad Ali; Asad Malik; Majid Asghar; Sher Afzal; Zulfiqar Ali	Haris Rauf (c); Rohail Nazir (†); Sarmad Bhatti; Ali Imran; Hassan Nawaz; Sudais Ulfat; Muhammad Musa; Mohammad Arham; Umair Afridi; Arsal Sheikh; Shayan Sheikh; Mohammad Hammad; Salman Khan; Hammad Siddique; Azan Tariq; Farmanullah Khan; ~~Imad Wasim~~	Asad Shafiq (c); Ziaullah; Ammad Alam; Omair Bin Yousuf; Khurram Manzoor; Danish Aziz; Azam Khan (†); Mohammad Hasan (†); Habibullah; Sohail Khan; Ghulam Mudassar; Aftab Ibrahim; Anwar Ali; Ashir Qureshi; Arif Yaqoob	Hussain Talat (c); Imran Butt; Umar Siddiq; Rizwan Hussain; Mohammad Nawaz; Junaid Ali (†); Shawaiz Irfan (†); Asif Ali; Hunain Shah; Umaid Asif; Asfand Mehran; Kashif Bhatti; Salman Irshad; Babar Azam; Hashim Ibraheem

=== Group C ===
Abbottabad	Bahawalpur	Faisalabad	Rawalpindi
Yasir Shah (c); Sajjad Ali (†); Afaq Ahmed; Anees Azam; Mohammad Arif; Khalid Usman; Aitizaz Habib Khan; Mehroz Rasheed; Israr Hussain; Fayyaz Khan; Aqib Khan; Ahmed Khan; Adil Naz; Khayyam Khan; Fakhar Zaman; Kamran Ghulam; Arshad Iqbal	Mohammad Junaid (c); Ali Imran; Mohammad Sudais; Mohammad Faizan Zafar; Mohammad Wasim Bhatti; Mohammad Shahrivar; Abdul Hadi (†); Mohammad Naveed Yousaf; Aun Shehzad; Mohammad Shahid Mirani; Husnain Majid; Mohammad Asif Ali; Mohammad Adeel Ur Rehman; Shayan Khalil; Syed Khurram Ali Shah	Asif Ali (c); Mohammad Shehzad; Irfan Khan; Abdul Samad; Abubakar Khan; Ali Shan (†); Taimoor Sultan; Muhammad Faizan; Mohammad Saleem; Waqas Maqsood; Sadaqat Ali; Asad Raza; Arham Nawab; Ahmed Safi Abdullah; Bilal Mehdi	Shadab Khan (c); Umar Amin (vc); Abdul Faseeh; Nasir Nawaz; Rehman Khan; Mubasir Khan; Zeeshan Malik; Umair Masood; Raza-ul-Mustafa (†); Sheraz Khan; Mohammad Faizan; Jahandad Khan; Mehran Mumtaz; Umer Khan; Haider Ali; Yasir Khan; Zaman Khan; Kashif Ali

=== Group D ===
Azad Jammu & Kashmir	FATA	Multan	Sialkot
Naveed Malik (c); Nadeem Khalil; Usman Maroof; Mohammad Haider; Syed Hashim Shah; Syed Faraz; Faizan Saleem; Basit Ali; Raja Farhan Khan (†); Daniyal Allah Ditta; Amir Hamza; Usman Yousaf; Aqib Liaqat; Awais Akram; Mohammad Shehzad	Khushdil Shah (c); Usman Shinwari; Salman Khan (†); Kashif Noor; Azaz Khan; Asif Ali; Mohammad Sarwar; Mohammad Riaz; Rehan Afridi (†); Asif Afridi; Maaz Khan; Irfanullah Shah; Akif Javed; Shahid Aziz; Samiullah Jnr	Sharoon Siraj (c); Zain Abbas; Haseebullah Khan (†); Aamer Yamin; Mohammad Imran; Mohammad Shehzad; Sharjeel Khan; Sohaib Maqsood; Mohammad Sadaqat; Tahir Hussain; Ali Usman; Zeeshan Ashraf; Sirajuddin; Faisal Akram; Ali Majid	Mohammad Rizwan (c); Mohammad Huraira; Bilal Asif; Usman Khalid; Amad Butt; Mirza Tahir Baig; Salman Khan (†); Ashir Mehmood; Zaki Shaz Khan; Mohammad Abbas; Sohaibullah; Asad Ali; Hamza Nazar; Shoaib Akhtar

== Group stage ==
The group stage will consist of four groups (with Group A and Group B consisting of five teams and Group C and Group D consisting of four teams), played as a single round-robin format. The top two teams in each group will progress to the Super 8 stage.

=== Group A ===
Pos	Team	Pld	W	L	NR	Pts	NRR	Qualification
1	Peshawar	4	3	1	0	6	2.713	Advanced to Super 8s
2	Lahore Whites	4	3	1	0	6	1.368	Advanced to Super 8s
3	Karachi Blues	4	3	1	0	6	1.110	
4	Larkana	4	1	3	0	2	−3.062	
5	Quetta	4	0	4	0	0	−2.292	

Source: ESPN Cricinfo

24 November 2023
10:00
Scorecard

Larkana; 137/8 (20 overs)	v	Lahore Whites; 141/3 (16.5 overs)
Umer Khalid 33 (19); Mohammad Irfan 3/12 (4 overs)		Ahmed Shehzad 60 (52); Ali Asghar 1/24 (4 overs)

Lahore Whites won by 7 wickets
National Bank of Pakistan Sports Complex, Karachi
Umpires: Ghulam Sarwar and Nasir Hussain

- Lahore Whites won the toss and elected to field.

24 November 2023
14:00
Scorecard

Peshawar; 101 (18.1 overs)	v	Karachi Blues; 102/3 (18.2 overs)
Mohammad Haris 39 (30); Waleed Azeem 3/24 (4 overs)		Fazal Subhan 50* (48); Mohammad Imran 1/11 (2 overs)

Karachi Blues won by 7 wickets
National Bank of Pakistan Sports Complex, Karachi
Umpires: Mohammad Sajid and Zulfiqar Jan

- Karachi Blues won the toss and elected to field.

25 November 2023
10:00
Scorecard

Lahore Whites; 128/9 (20 overs)	v	Peshawar; 129/3 (18.3 overs)
Saad Nasim 41 (32); Mohammad Imran 3/25 (4 overs)		Adil Amin 61* (64); Mohammad Amir Khan 1/17 (4)

Peshawar won by 7 wickets
National Bank of Pakistan Sports Complex, Karachi
Umpires: Mohammad Sajid and Saqib Khan

- Peshawar won the toss and elected to field.

25 November 2023
14:00
Scorecard

Quetta; 145/8 (20 overs)	v	Karachi Blues; 146/5 (19 overs)
Jahanzaib Sultan 77 (55); Gohar Faiz 2/27 (4 overs)		Abdul Bangalzai 48 (44); Mohammad Asghar 3/19 (3 overs)

Karachi Blues won by 5 wickets
National Bank of Pakistan Sports Complex, Karachi
Umpires: Ghulam Sarwar and Imran Javed

- Quetta won the toss and elected to bat.

26 November 2023
10:00
Scorecard

Peshawar; 158/2 (13 overs)	v	Quetta; 89/7 (13 overs)
Iftikhar Ahmed 51* (23); Jalat Khan 2/12 (3 overs)		Salahuddin 34* (24); Imran Khan 2/16 (3 overs)

Peshawar won by 69 runs
National Bank of Pakistan Sports Complex, Karachi
Umpires: Asif Yaqoob and Mohammad Sajid

- Quetta won the toss and elected to field.
- Match reduced to 13 overs per side due to rain.

26 November 2023
14:00
Scorecard

Larkana; 61 (16.5 overs)	v	Karachi Blues; 63/1 (8.2 overs)
Faraz Aziz 26 (32); Waleed Azeem 4/9 (3.5 overs)		Mohammad Taha 36* (17); Ali Asghar 1/15 (2 overs)

Karachi Blues won by 9 wickets
National Bank of Pakistan Sports Complex, Karachi
Umpires: Aaley Haider and Saqib Khan

- Larkana won the toss and elected to bat.

27 November 2023
15:00 (D/N)
Scorecard

Quetta; 132/5 (20 overs)	v	Lahore Whites; 135/1 (12 overs)
Abdul Bangalzai 79 (63); Mohammad Irfan 2/18 (4 overs)		Ahmed Shehzad 81 (44); Hanan Achakzai 1/22 (2 overs)

Lahore won by 9 wickets
National Bank Cricket Arena, Karachi
Umpires: Asif Yaqoob and Nasir Hussain

- Lahore Whites won the toss and elected to field.

27 November 2023
20:00 (N)
Scorecard

Peshawar; 248/2 (20 overs)	v	Larkana; 122/7 (20 overs)
Sahibzada Farhan 109* (54); Zahid Mahmood 1/35 (4 overs)		Umar Khalid 33 (30); Mohammad Imran 2/15 (4 overs)

Peshawar won by 126 runs
National Bank Cricket Arena, Karachi
Umpires: Aaley Haider and Mohammad Asif

- Larkana won the toss and elected to field.

28 November 2023
10:00
Scorecard

Larkana; 125 (20 overs)	v	Quetta; 110 (19.5 overs)
Imtiaz Leghari 48* (24); Salahuddin 3/2 (1 over)		Jalat Khan 25 (26); Zahid Mahmood 2/15 (4 overs); Mushtaq Kalhoro 2/15 (4 overs)

Larkana won by 15 runs
National Bank of Pakistan Sports Complex, Karachi
Umpires: Mohammad Asif and Waleed Yaqub

- Quetta won the toss and elected to field.

28 November 2023
20:00 (N)
Scorecard

Karachi Blues; 150/7 (20 overs)	v	Lahore Whites; 154/3 (18 overs)
Mohammad Taha 41 (27); Ahmed Daniyal 2/20 (4 overs)		Ahmed Shehzad 72* (52); Mohammad Asghar 1/19 (3 overs)

Lahore Whites won by 7 wickets
National Bank Cricket Arena, Karachi
Umpires: Asif Yaqoob and Zulfiqar Jan

- Lahore Whites won the toss and elected to field.

=== Group B ===
Pos	Team	Pld	W	L	Pts	NRR	Qualification
1	Lahore Blues	4	4	0	8	0.223	Advanced to Super 8s
2	Karachi Whites	4	3	1	6	1.165	Advanced to Super 8s
3	Islamabad	4	2	2	4	−0.055	
4	Dera Murad Jamali	4	1	3	2	−0.321	
5	Hyderabad	4	0	4	0	−0.878	

Source: ESPN Cricinfo

24 November 2023
10:00
Scorecard

Karachi Whites; 121/6 (18.3 overs)	v	Islamabad; 119/7 (20 overs)
Asad Shafiq 59 (36); Shayan Shaikh 2/14 (4 overs)		Hassan Nawaz 26 (21); Arif Yaqoob 4/18 (4 overs)

Karachi Whites won by 4 wickets
United Bank Limited Sports Complex, Karachi
Umpires: Majid Hussain and Waleed Yaqub

- Karachi Whites won the toss and elected to field.

24 November 2023
14:00
Scorecard

Hyderabad; 116/8 (20 overs)	v	Dera Murad Jamali; 117 (19.3 overs)
Muhammad Suleman 39 (39); Mohammad Ayaz 2/26 (overs)		Zubair Khan 36 (34); Majid Asghar 3/15 (4 overs)

Dera Murad Jamali won by 1 run
United Bank Limited Sports Complex, Karachi
Umpires: Qaiser Khan and Saqib Khan

- Dera Murad Jamali won the toss and elected to Bat.

25 November 2023
10:00
Scorecard

Karachi Whites; 183/2(17.5 Overs)	v	Dera Murad Jamali; 182/6 (20 Overs)
Omair Yousuf 78* (45); Nasir Khan 2/23 (4 overs)		Fahad Hussain 45 (26); Ziaullah 3/36 (4 overs)

Karachi Whites won by 8 wickets
United Bank Limited Sports Complex, Karachi
Umpires: Qaiser Khan and Rashid Riaz

- Karachi Whites won the toss and elected to field.

25 November 2023
14:00
Scorecard

Hyderabad; 153/6 (20 Overs)	v	Lahore Blues; 154/9 (20 Overs)
Mohammad Suleman 57 (49); Hunain Shah 3/20 (4 overs)		Imran Butt 48 (32); Jawad Ali 3/38 (4 overs)

Lahore Blues won by 1 wicket
United Bank Limited Sports Complex, Karachi
Umpires: Majid Hussain and Shozab Raza

- Hyderabad won the toss and elected to Bat.

26 November 2023
15:00 (D/N)
Scorecard

Lahore Blues; 159/8 (20 Overs)	v	Karachi Whites; 154/7 (20 Overs)
Imran Butt 54 (35); Aftab Ibrahim 2/15 (3 overs)		Ammad Alam 45 (31); Kashif Bhatti 2/29 (4 overs)

Lahore Blues won by 5 runs
National Bank Cricket Arena, Karachi
Umpires: Imtiaz Iqbal and Shozab Raza

- Karachi Whites won the toss and elected to field.

26 November 2023
20:00 (N)
Scorecard

Islamabad; 130/8 (20 overs)	v	Dera Murad Jamali; 127 (19.1 overs)
Hammad Saddique 51* (41); Salim Mal 2/26 (4 overs)		Zubair Khan 46 (40); Umair Afridi 4/24 (3.1 overs)

Islamabad won by 2 wickets
National Bank Cricket Arena, Karachi
Umpires: Imran Javed and Rashid Riaz

- Dera Murad Jamali won the toss and elected to Bat.

27 November 2023
10:00
Scorecard

Lahore Blues; 142/5 (19.3 overs)	v	Dera Murad Jamali; 139/9 (20 overs)
Rizwan Hussain 45 (39); Nasir Khan 2/16 (4 overs)		Nasir Khan 30 (29); Asfand Mehran3/24 (4 overs)

Lahore Blues won by 5 wickets
United Bank Limited Sports Complex, Karachi
Umpires: Qaiser Khan and Tariq Rasheed

- Dera Murad Jamali won the toss and elected to Bat.

27 November 2023
14:00
Scorecard

Islamabad; 153/3 (20 overs)	v	Hyderabad; 143/7 (20 overs)
Sarmad Bhatti 56* (36); Muhammad Asad Malik 1/17 (3 overs)		Mohammad Suleman 62 (56); Umair Afridi 3/22 (4 overs)

Islamabad won by 10 runs
United Bank Limited Sports Complex, Karachi
Umpires: Imran Javed and Waleed Yaqub

- Islamabad won the toss and elected to Bat.

28 November 2023
10:00
Scorecard

Lahore Blues; 154/7 (20 overs)	v	Islamabad; 149 (19.4 overs)
Qasim Akram 64 (51); Umair Afridi 3/30 (4 overs)		Sarmad Bhatti 45 (36); Usman Qadir 3/28 (4 overs)

Lahore Blues won by 5 runs
United Bank Limited Sports Complex, Karachi
Umpires: Imran Javed and Waleed Yaqub

- Islamabad won the toss and elected to field.

28 November 2023
15:00 (D/N)
Scorecard

Karachi Whites; 103/3 (12.1 Overs)	v	Hyderabad; 102 (18.4 Overs)
Ammad Alam 53 (33); Asim Jutt 1/23 (3.1)		Tayyab Ali Shah 32 (37); Sohail Khan 5/10 (3.4 overs)

Karachi Whites won by 7 wickets
National Bank Cricket Arena, Karachi
Umpires: Faisal Afridi and Rashid Riaz

- Karachi Whites won the toss and elected to field.

=== Group C ===
Pos	Team	Pld	W	L	Pts	NRR	Qualification
1	Rawalpindi	3	3	0	6	1.144	Advanced to Super 8s
2	Abbottabad	3	2	1	4	1.165	Advanced to Super 8s
3	Faisalabad	3	1	2	2	−0.085	
4	Bahawalpur	3	0	3	0	−2.492	

Source: ESPN Cricinfo

24 November 2023
15:00 (D/N)
Scorecard

Rawalpindi; 180/7 (19.5 overs)	v	Abbottabad; 177/5 (20 overs)
Raza Ul Mustafa 42* (18); Aqib Khan 2/33 (2.5 overs)		Fakhar Zaman 72 (49); Zaman Khan 2/40 (4 overs)

Rawalpindi won by 3 wickets
National Bank Cricket Arena, Karachi
Umpires: Farooq Ali and Shozab Raza

- Rawalpindi won the toss and elected to field.

24 November 2023
20:00 (N)
Scorecard

Faisalabad; 118/2 (15.3 Overs)	v	Bahawalpur; 117/9 (20 Overs)
Muhammad Faizan 76* (55); Mohammad Junaid 1/30 (4 overs)		Moinuddin 29 (29); Asad Raza 3/19 (4 overs)

Faisalabad won by 8 wickets
National Bank Cricket Arena, Karachi
Umpires: Abdul Muqeet and Mohammad Asif

- Faisalabad won the toss and elected to field.

26 November 2023
10:00
Scorecard

Rawalpindi; 174/6 (20 Overs)	v	Faisalabad; 147/9 (20 Overs)
Zeeshan Malik 107* (69); Asad Raza 2/43 (4 overs)		Asif Ali 32 (22); Mehran Mumtaz 2/18 (4 overs)

Rawalpindi won by 27 runs
HPC Oval Ground, Karachi
Umpires: Farooq Ali and Kashif Sohail

- Faisalabad won the toss and elected to field.

26 November 2023
14:00
Scorecard

Bahawalpur; 115/9 (20 Overs)	v	Abbottabad; 116/3 (13 Overs)
Mohammad Shahid 55 (36); Khalid Usman 2/15 (4 overs)		Fakhar Zaman 42 (27); Mohammad Shahid 2/15 (3 overs)

Abbottabad won by 7 wickets
HPC Oval Ground, Karachi
Umpires: Abdul Muqeet and Aslam Bareach

- Bahawalpur won the toss and elected to Bat.

27 November 2023
10:00
Scorecard

Rawalpindi; 232/3 (20 overs)	v	Bahawalpur; 195/7 (20 overs)
Zeeshan Malik 57* (22); Ghulfam Aziz 2/54 (4 overs)		Aun Shehzad 76 (47); Shiraz Khan 2/38 (4 overs)

Rawalpindi won by 37 runs
HPC Oval Ground, Karachi
Umpires: Farooq Ali and Ghulam Sarwar

- Bahawalpur won the toss and elected to field.

27 November 2023
14:00
Scorecard

Abbottabad; 144/4 (18.3 overs)	v	Faisalabad; 143 (20 overs)
Kamran Ghulam 62* (43); Sadaqat Ali 2/16 (4 overs)		Muhammad Abdul Samad 47 (31); Shahhab 2/22 (4 overs)

Abbottabad won by 6 wickets
HPC Oval Ground, Karachi
Umpires: Aslam Bareach and Kashif Sohail

- Abbottabad won the toss and elected to field.

=== Group D ===
Pos	Team	Pld	W	L	Pts	NRR	Qualification
1	Sialkot	3	2	1	4	2.347	Advanced to Super 8s
2	FATA	3	2	1	4	0.804	Advanced to Super 8s
3	Multan	3	2	1	4	0.380	
4	Azad Jammu & Kashmir	3	0	3	0	−2.881	

Source: ESPN Cricinfo

24 November 2023
10:00
Scorecard

Multan; 148/7 (20 overs)	v	Sialkot; 148/8 (20 overs)
Zeeshan Ashraf 61 (45); Shoaib Malik 2/23 (4 overs)		Tahir Baig 66 (48); Tahir Hussain 4/26 (4 overs)

Match Tied (Sialkot won the Super Over)
HPC Oval Ground, Karachi
Umpires: Imranullah Aslam and Kashif Sohail

- Multan won the toss and elected to field.

24 November 2023
14:00
Scorecard

FATA; 153/8 (20 Overs)	v	Azad Jammu & Kashmir; 113/7 (20 Overs)
Khushdil Shah 54 (40); Basit Ali 3/15 (3 overs)		Naveed Malik 41 (39); Shahid Aziz 4/20 (4)

FATA won by 40 runs
HPC Oval Ground, Karachi
Umpires: Asif Yaqoob and Aslam Bareach

- FATA won the toss and elected to bat.

25 November 2023
15:00 (D/N)
Scorecard

Azad Jammu & Kashmir; 131/10 (19.2 Overs)	v	Multan; 132/3 (17.3 Overs)
Usman Maroof 51 (31); Tahir Hussain 3/21 (3.2 overs)		Sharjeel Khan 53 (39); Naveed Malik 1/24 (4 overs)

Multan won by 7 wickets
National Bank Cricket Arena, Karachi
Umpires: Mohammad Asif and Imranullah Aslam

- Multan won the toss and elected to field.

25 November 2023
20:00 (N)
Scorecard

Sialkot; 151/3 (15 Overs)	v	FATA; 77/1 (8.3 Overs)
Mohammad Huraira 71* (42); Shahid Aziz 2/29 (3 overs)		Samiullah 32* (24); Usman Khalid 1/17 (2.3 overs)

FATA won by 2 runs (DLS method)
National Bank Cricket Arena, Karachi
Umpires: Waleed Yaqub and Nadeem Arshad

- Sialkot won the toss and elected to bat.

27 November 2023
10:00
Scorecard

Multan; 153/5 (20 overs)	v	FATA; 150/7 (20 overs)
Sharoon Siraj 56 (33); Akif Javed 2/21 (4 overs)		Samiullah 47 (50); Tahir Hussain 2/27 (4 overs)

Multan won by 3 runs
National Bank of Pakistan Sports Complex, Karachi
Umpires: Majid Hussain and Imranullah Aslam

- FATA won the toss and elected to field.

27 November 2023
14:00
Scorecard

Sialkot; 60/1 (6 overs)	v	Azad Jammu & Kashmir; 59 (18.2 overs)
Amad Butt 27* (13); Usman Yousaf 1/39 (3 overs)		Naved Malik 24 (29); Usman Khalid 4/13 (4 overs)

Sialkot won by 9 wickets
National Bank of Pakistan Sports Complex, Karachi
Umpires: Zulfiqar Jan and Mustujab Alam

- Sialkot won the toss and elected to field.

== Super 8s ==
After the group stage, the top two teams in each group will progress to the Super 8 stage which will be played as a single round-robin with the top four teams advancing to the knockout stage.

=== Points Table ===
Pos	Team	Pld	W	L	NR	Pts	NRR	Qualification
1	Peshawar	7	7	0	0	14	2.124	Advanced to knockout stage
2	Karachi Whites	7	5	2	0	10	0.934	Advanced to knockout stage
3	Abbottabad	7	5	2	0	10	0.444	Advanced to knockout stage
4	Rawalpindi	7	4	3	0	8	−1.004	Advanced to knockout stage
5	Lahore Blues	7	2	5	0	4	0.239	
6	Sialkot	7	2	5	0	4	−0.717	
7	Lahore Whites	7	2	5	0	4	−1.245	
8	FATA	7	1	6	0	2	−0.766	

Source: Cricinfo

=== Matches ===
==== Round 1 ====
1 December 2023
13:00
Scorecard

Rawalpindi; 179/7 (20 overs)	v	Abbottabad; 147/5 (20 overs)
Mohammad Nawaz 72 (36); Adil Naz 3/45 (4 overs)		Afaq Ahmed 30 (18); Mohammad Nawaz 2/19 (4 overs)

Rawalpindi won by 32 runs
United Bank Limited Sports Complex, Karachi
Umpires: Aslam Bareach and Tariq Rasheed
Player of the match: Mohammad Nawaz (Rawalpindi)

- Rawalpindi won the toss and elected to bat.

1 December 2023
13:00
Scorecard

FATA; 103 (16.5 overs)	v	Sialkot; 106/2 (14.1 overs)
Salman Khan 23 (28); Sohaibullah 3/8 (3 overs)		Salman Khan 48* (38); Akif Javed 2/31 (3 overs)

Sialkot won by 8 wickets
National Bank of Pakistan Sports Complex, Karachi
Umpires: Imtiaz Iqbal and Kashif Sohail
Player of the match: Sohaibullah (Sialkot)

- Sialkot won the toss and elected to field.

1 December 2023
15:00 (D/N)
Scorecard

Lahore Whites; 136/6 (20 overs)	v	Peshawar; 142/3 (13.1 overs)
Ahmed Shehzad 53 (35); Azam Khan 2/21 (3 overs)		Sahibzada Farhan 64 (31); Saad Nasim 2/15 (3 overs)

Peshawar won by 7 wickets
National Bank Cricket Arena, Karachi
Umpires: Abdul Muqeet and Rashid Riaz
Player of the match: Sahibzada Farhan (Peshawar)

- Peshawar won the toss and elected to field.

1 December 2023
20:00 (N)
Scorecard

Karachi Whites; 164/9 (20 overs)	v	Lahore Blues; 145 (19.4 overs)
Azam Khan 41 (22); Nisar Ahmed 3/22 (4 overs)		Kashif Bhatti 50 (45); Danish Aziz 3/16 (4 overs)

Karachi Whites won by 19 runs
National Bank Cricket Arena, Karachi
Umpires: Asif Yaqoob and Zulfiqar Jan
Player of the match: Danish Aziz (Karachi Whites)

- Lahore Blues won the toss and elected to field.

==== Round 2 ====
2 December 2023
13:00
Scorecard

Peshawar; 186/3 (20 overs)	v	Karachi Whites; 130 (20 overs)
Adil Amin 75* (44); Ghulam Mudassar 1/39 (4 overs)		Sohail Khan 34* (23); Iftikhar Ahmed 3/17 (4 overs)

Peshawar won by 56 runs
United Bank Limited Sports Complex, Karachi
Umpires: Aaley Haider and Imranullah Aslam
Player of the match: Iftikhar Ahmed (Peshawar)

- Karachi Whites won the toss and elected to field.

2 December 2023
13:00
Scorecard

Lahore Blues; 148/5 (20 overs)	v	Lahore Whites; 149/5 (19.5 overs)
Junaid Ali 34* (20); Mohammad Naveed 2/36 (4 overs)		Tayyab Tahir 67* (54); Umaid Asif 2/26 (4 overs)

Lahore White won by 5 wickets
National Bank of Pakistan Sports Complex, Karachi
Umpires: Aslam Bareach and Majid Hussain
Player of the match: Tayyab Tahir (Lahore Whites)

- Lahore Whites won the toss and elected to field.

2 December 2023
15:00 (D/N)
Scorecard

FATA; 168/7 (20 overs)	v	Rawalpindi; 169/3 (18.2 overs)
Salman Khan 83* (52); Zaman Khan 3/25 (4 overs)		Yasir Khan 107 (59); Shahid Aziz 2/38 (4 overs)

Rawalpindi won by 7 wickets
National Bank Cricket Arena, Karachi
Umpires: Imtiaz Iqbal and Rashid Riaz
Player of the match: Yasir Khan (Rawalpindi)

- Rawalpindi won the toss and elected to field.

2 December 2023
20:00 (N)
Scorecard

Sialkot; 119/8 (20 overs)	v	Abbottabad; 120/5 (17.4 overs)
Tahir Baig 38 (29); Yasir Shah 3/12 (4 overs)		Sajjad Ali Jnr 50 (45); Bilal Asif 2/24 (4 overs)

Abbottabad won by 5 wickets
National Bank Cricket Arena, Karachi
Umpires: Abdul Muqeet and Asif Yaqoob
Player of the match: Yasir Shah (Abbottabad)

- Sialkot won the toss and elected to bat.

==== Round 3 ====
3 December 2023
13:00
Scorecard

Sialkot; 163/2 (20 overs)	v	Rawalpindi; 167/7 (18.4 overs)
Shoaib Malik 84* (56); Awais Anwar 1/26 (4 overs)		Yasir Khan 87* (52); Sohaibullah 2/32 (4 overs)

Rawalpindi won by 3 wickets
United Bank Limited Sports Complex, Karachi
Umpires: Aaley Haider and Majid Hussain
Player of the match: Yasir Khan (Rawalpindi)

- Rawalpindi won the toss and elected to field.

3 December 2023
13:00
Scorecard

Abbottabad; 188/5 (20 overs)	v	FATA; 131 (17.2 overs)
Fakhar Zaman 69 (48); Khushdil Shah 2/39 (4 overs)		Samiullah 53 (36); Shahab Khan 5/20 (3.2 overs)

Abbottabad won by 57 runs
National Bank of Pakistan Sports Complex, Karachi
Umpires: Aslam Bareach and Imranullah Aslam
Player of the match: Shahab Khan (Abbottabad)

- FATA won the toss and elected to field.

3 December 2023
15:00 (D/N)
Scorecard

Peshawar; 133 (20 overs)	v	Lahore Blues; 128/8 (20 overs)
Mohammad Haris 55 (31); Usman Qadir 5/14 (4 overs)		Kashif Bhatti 25 (17); Iftikhar Ahmed 2/16 (4 overs)

Peshawar won by 5 runs
National Bank Cricket Arena, Karachi
Umpires: Asif Yaqoob and Abdul Muqeet
Player of the match: Mohammad Haris (Peshawar)

- Lahore Blues won the toss and elected to field.

3 December 2023
20:00 (N)
Scorecard

Karachi Whites; 173/7 (20 overs)	v	Lahore Whites; 110 (16.5 overs)
Khurram Manzoor 50 (37); Mohammad Irfan 2/15 (4 overs)		Tayyab Tahir 36 (27); Sohail Khan 3/19 (3.5 overs)

Karachi Whites won by 63 runs
National Bank Cricket Arena, Karachi
Umpires: Zulfiqar Jan and Rashid Riaz
Player of the match: Khurram Manzoor (Karachi Whites)

- Lahore Whites won the toss and elected to field.

==== Round 4 ====
4 December 2023
13:00
Scorecard

Peshawar; 230/4 (20 overs)	v	Sialkot; 157 (20 overs)
Israrullah 64 (39); Khalid Usman 1/16 (2 overs)		Momin Waqar 34 (18); Abbas Afridi 3/22 (3)

Peshawar won by 73 runs
United Bank Limited Sports Complex, Karachi
Umpires: Nasir Hussain and Imranullah Aslam
Player of the match: Iftikhar Ahmed (Peshawar)

- Sialkot won the toss and elected to field.

4 December 2023
13:00
Scorecard

Karachi Whites; 147/6 (20 overs)	v	Abbottabad; 148/4 (18.5 overs)
Omair Yousuf 43 (43); Yasir Shah 2/27 (4 overs)		Sajjad Ali Jnr 56 (42); Arif Yaqoob 2/33 (4 overs)

Abbottabad won by 6 wickets
National Bank of Pakistan Sports Complex, Karachi
Umpires: Mohammad Asif and Ghulam Sarwar
Player of the match: Kamran Ghulam (Abbottabad)

- Abbottabad won the toss and elected to field.

4 December 2023
15:00 (D/N)
Scorecard

Lahore Whites; 118/6 (20 overs)	v	FATA; 119/3 (14.3 overs)
Mohammad Irfan 26* (17); Maaz Khan 2/18 (4 overs)		Samiullah 71* (51); Mohammad Amir Khan 2/22 (3 overs)

FATA won by 7 wickets
National Bank Cricket Arena, Karachi
Umpires: Asif Yaqoob and Mohammad Sajid
Player of the match: Samiullah (FATA)

- Lahore Whites won the toss and elected to bat.

4 December 2023
20:00 (N)
Scorecard

Lahore Blues; 166/3 (20 overs)	v	Rawalpindi; 102 (17.4 overs)
Hussain Talat 42* (32); Mehran Mumtaz 2/22 (3 overs)		Mubasir Khan 24 (26); Nisar Ahmed 5/5 (2.4 overs)

Lahore Blues won by 64 runs
National Bank Cricket Arena, Karachi
Umpires: Rashid Riaz and Majid Hussain
Player of the match: Nisar Ahmed (Lahore Blues)

- Rawalpindi won the toss and elected to field.

==== Round 5 ====
6 December 2023
13:00
Scorecard

Lahore Whites; 146/6 (20 overs)	v	Rawalpindi; 147/5 (19.1 overs)
Muhammad Akhlaq 37 (21); Zaman Khan 3/23 (4 overs)		Yasir Khan 33 (28); Saad Khan 2/17 (3 overs)

Rawalpindi won by 5 wickets
United Bank Limited Sports Complex, Karachi
Umpires: Shozab Raza and Waleed Yaqoob
Player of the match: Jahandad Khan (Rawalpindi)

- Lahore Whites won the toss and elected to field.
- Hasan Rizwan (Lahore Whites) made his T20 debut.

6 December 2023
13:00
Scorecard

Lahore Blues; 153/4 (20 overs)	v	FATA; 145/9 (20 overs)
Hussain Talat 57* (36); Khushdil Shah 2/31 (4 overs)		Khushdil Shah 54 (42); Nisar Ahmad 3/16 (3 overs)

Lahore Blues won by 8 runs
National Bank of Pakistan Sports Complex, Karachi
Umpires: Kashif Sohail and Mohammad Sajid
Player of the match: Hussain Talat (Lahore Blues)

- Lahore Blues won the toss and elected to bat.

6 December 2023
15:00 (D/N)
Scorecard

Peshawar; 195/4 (20 overs)	v	Abbottabad; 174/9 (20 overs)
Sahibzada Farhan 64 (40); Shahab Khan 2/37 (4 overs)		Kamran Ghulam 67 (39); Abbas Afridi 3/17 (4 overs)

Peshawar won by 21 runs
National Bank Cricket Arena, Karachi
Umpires: Faisal Afridi and Qaiser Khan
Player of the match: Sahibzada Farhan (Peshawar)

- Peshawar won the toss and elected to bat.
- Imran Khan (Abbottabad) made his T20 debut.

6 December 2023
20:00 (N)
Scorecard

Sialkot; 165/9 (20 overs)	v	Karachi Whites; 166/4 (18 overs)
Shoaib Malik 54 (44); Sohail Khan 3/34 (4 overs)		Azam Khan 59* (24); Usman Khalid 2/16 (3 overs)

Karachi Whites won by 6 wickets
National Bank Cricket Arena, Karachi
Umpires: Aslam Bareach and Saqib Khan
Player of the match: Azam Khan (Karachi Whites)

- Sialkot won the toss and elected to bat.

==== Round 6 ====
7 December 2023
13:00
Scorecard

Rawalpindi; 107 (19 overs)	v	Peshawar; 109/3 (13.2 overs)
Umar Amin 31 (33); Mohammad Imran 6/16 (4 overs)		Sahibzada Farhan 47 (23); Mohammad Nawaz 2/31 (4 overs)

Peshawar won by 7 wickets
United Bank Limited Sports Complex, Karachi
Umpires: Waleed Yaqub and Farooq Ali
Player of the match: Mohammad Imran (Peshawar)

- Rawalpindi won the toss and elected to bat.

7 December 2023
13:00
Scorecard

FATA; 139/8 (20 overs)	v	Karachi Whites; 142/2 (19 overs)
Kashif Noor 32 (23); Arif Yaqoob 4/25 (4 overs)		Ammad Alam 53 (42); Shahid Aziz 1/16 (2 overs)

Karachi Whites won by 8 wickets
National Bank of Pakistan Sports Complex, Karachi
Umpires: Ghulam Sarwar and Saqib Khan
Player of the match: Arif Yaqoob (Karachi Whites)

- Karachi Whites won the toss and elected to field.

7 December 2023
15:00 (D/N)
Scorecard

Abbottabad; 205/6 (20 overs)	v	Lahore Whites; 183/8 (20 overs)
Sajjad Ali Jnr 90 (51); Mohammad Amir Khan 4/35 (4 overs)		Mohammad Faiq 63 (35); Shahab Khan 4/33 (4 overs)

Abbottabad won by 22 runs
National Bank Cricket Arena, Karachi
Umpires: Mohammad Asif and Nasir Hussain
Player of the match: Sajid Ali Jnr (Abbottabad)

- Lahore Whites won the toss and elected to field.

7 December 2023
20:00 (N)
Scorecard

Lahore Blues; 149/8 (20 overs)	v	Sialkot; 151/3 (19.1 overs)
Qasim Akram 53* (35); Shoaib Malik 2/19 (4 overs)		Mohammad Huraira 86* (55); Umaid Asif 1/24 (4 overs)

Sialkot won by 7 wickets
National Bank Cricket Arena, Karachi
Umpires: Shozab Raza and Mohammad Sajid
Player of the match: Mohammad Huraira (Sialkot)

- Lahore Blues won the toss and elected to bat.

==== Round 7 ====
8 December 2023
13:00
Scorecard

Lahore Whites; 189/2 (20 overs)	v	Sialkot; 159 (18.2 overs)
Mohammad Faiq 110 (60); Bilal Asif 1/25 (3 overs)		Shoaib Malik 64 (33); Mohammad Irfan 3/26 (4 overs)

Lahore Whites won by 30 runs
United Bank Limited Sports Complex, Karachi
Umpires: Nasir Hussain and Shozab Raza
Player of the match: Mohammad Faiq (Lahore Whites)

- Lahore Whites won the toss and elected to bat.

8 December 2023
13:00
Scorecard

Lahore Blues; 171/6 (20 overs)	v	Abbottabad; 174/7 (19.5 overs)
Junaid Ali 44 (24); Aqib Khan 2/22 (4)		Kamran Ghulam 69 (45); Nisar Ahmed 2/35 (3.5 overs)

Abbottabad won by 3 wickets
National Bank of Pakistan Sports Complex, Karachi
Umpires: Ghulam Sarwar and Qaiser Khan
Player of the match: Kamran Ghulam (Abbottabad)

- Abbottabad won the toss and elected to field.
- Khayam Khan (Abbottabad) made his T20 debut.

8 December 2023
15:30 (D/N)
Scorecard

FATA; 180/3 (20 overs)	v	Peshawar; 185/4 (19.4 overs)
Rehan Afridi 90* (56); Iftikhar Ahmed 1/22 (4 overs)		Sahibzada Farhan 74 (40); Khushdil Shah 2/36 (4 overs)

Peshawar won by 6 wickets
National Bank Cricket Arena, Karachi
Umpires: Faisal Afridi and Saqib Khan
Player of the match: Sahibzada Farhan (Peshawar)

- Peshawar won the toss and elected to field.
- Sajjad Ibraheem (Peshawar) made his T20 debut.

8 December 2023
20:00 (N)
Scorecard

Karachi Whites; 170/5 (20 overs)	v	Rawalpindi; 84 (14.1 overs)
Omair Yousuf 46 (39); Jahandad Khan 3/37 (4 overs)		Mohammad Nawaz 32 (21); Arif Yaqoob 3/10 (2.1 overs)

Karachi Whites won by 86 runs
National Bank Cricket Arena, Karachi
Umpires: Farooq Ali and Mohammad Asif
Player of the match: Danish Aziz (Karachi Whites)

- Karachi Whites won the toss and elected to bat.

== Knockout stage ==
Semi-finals
1	Peshawar	169 (19.2 overs)
3	Abbottabad	175/3 (17.5 overs)
4	Rawalpindi	177/5 (20 overs)
2	Karachi Whites	178/6 (18.1 overs)

Final
2	Karachi Whites	155/9 (20 overs)
3	Abbottabad	146/9 (20 overs)

=== Semi-finals ===
9 December 2023
15:00 (D/N)
Scorecard

Peshawar; 169 (19.2 overs)	v	Abbottabad; 175/3 (17.5 overs)
Israrullah 73 (34); Shahab Khan 5/33 (3.2 overs)		Fakhar Zaman 79* (46); Abbas Ali 1/7 (0.5 overs)

Abbottabad won by 7 wickets
National Bank Cricket Arena, Karachi
Umpires: Faisal Afridi and Mohammad Asif
Player of the match: Shahab Khan (Abbottabad)

- Abbottabad won the toss and elected to field.

9 December 2023
20:00 (N)
Scorecard

Rawalpindi; 177/5 (20 overs)	v	Karachi Whites; 178/6 (18.1 overs)
Umar Amin 82* (47); Sohail Khan 2/21 (4 overs)		Azam Khan 38 (25); Mehran Mumtaz 2/17 (4 overs)

Karachi Whites won by 4 wickets
National Bank Cricket Arena, Karachi
Umpires: Imran Javed and Waleed Yaqub
Player of the match: Azam Khan (Karachi Whites)

- Rawalpindi won the toss and elected to bat.

=== Final ===
10 December 2023
20:00 (N)
Scorecard

Karachi Whites; 155/9 (20 overs)	v	Abbottabad; 146/9 (20 overs)
Khurram Manzoor 53 (37); Shahab Khan 4/28 (4 overs)		Atizaz Habib Khan 43* (26); Shahnawaz Dahani 3/16 (4 overs)

Karachi Whites won by 9 runs
National Bank Cricket Arena, Karachi
Umpires: Faisal Afridi and Imtiaz Iqbal
Player of the match: Shahnawaz Dahani (Karachi Whites)

- Abbottabad won the toss and elected to field.

== Awards and statistics ==
=== Most runs ===
Player	Team	Runs
Sahibzada Farhan	Peshawar	492
Kamran Ghulam	Abbottabad	451
Sajjad Ali	Abbottabad	442
Omair Yousuf	Karachi Whites	401
Iftikhar Ahmed	Peshawar	395

- Source: ESPNcricinfo

=== Most wickets ===
Player	Team	Wickets
Shahab Khan	Abbottabad	25
Sohail Khan	Karachi Whites	22
Arif Yaqoob	Karachi Whites	21
Mohammad Imran	Peshawar	20
Iftikhar Ahmed	Peshawar	18

- Source: ESPNcricinfo

=== End of season awards ===
Name	Team	Award	Prize
Iftikhar Ahmed	Peshawar	Player of the Tournament	Rs. 250,000 (US$890)
Sahibzada Farhan	Peshawar	Batsman of the tournament	Rs. 250,000 (US$890)
Shahab Khan	Abbottabad	Bowler of the tournament	Rs. 250,000 (US$890)
Sajjad Ali	Abbottabad	Wicket-keeper of the tournament	Rs. 250,000 (US$890)

- Source: PCB

== Prize ==
The winning team of the tournament received a prize money of PKR 5 million while the runners-up were awarded PKR 2.5 million.
