= Mohammad Shahid =

Mohammad or Muhammad Shahid may refer to:

- Mohammed Shahid (1960–2016), Indian hockey player
- Mohammad Shahid (Bangladeshi cricketer) (born 1988), Bangladeshi cricketer
- Mohammad Shahid (Indian cricketer) (1948–2014), Indian cricketer
- Mohammad Shahid (Pakistani cricketer) (born 2000), Pakistani cricketer
- Muhammad Shahid (footballer) (born 1984), Pakistani footballer
- Mohammad Shahid Jabbar, Indian footballer
- Muhammad Shahid Sarwar, Bangladeshi military personnel
- Mohammad Hameed Shahid (born 1957), Urdu fiction writer and literary critic
