= 2024 Pakistan Super League =

9th edition of the Pakistan Super League

2024 Pakistan Super League پاکستان سپر لیگ ۲۰۲۴
- Official logo of HBL PSL 9 (Note: As stated on the official website)
- Dates: 17 February – 18 March 2024
- Administrator: Pakistan Cricket Board
- Cricket format: Twenty20
- Tournament format(s): Double round robin and playoffs
- Champions: Islamabad United (3rd title)
- Runners-up: Multan Sultans
- Participants: 6
- Matches: 34
- Player of the series: Shadab Khan (IU) (305 runs & 14 wickets)
- Most runs: Babar Azam (PZ) (569)
- Most wickets: Usama Mir (MS) (24)
- Official website: psl-t20.com

The 2024 Pakistan Super League (branded as HBL PSL 9) was the ninth edition of the Pakistan Super League, a professional Twenty20 cricket league organized by the Pakistan Cricket Board (PCB). The tournament was played between six teams in a double round robin and page playoff system. The matches were held in four cities across Pakistan from 17 February to 18 March 2024.

The Lahore Qalandars, the two-time defending champions, were eliminated in the group stage with last position. In the final, Islamabad United defeated Multan Sultans by 2 wickets, becoming the first team to win a third PSL title. A Sports was the official broadcaster for the season. Babar Azam and Usama Mir respectively achieved the awards for most runs and most wickets, while Shadab Khan was named Player of the Tournament.

== Background ==
As the 2024 Pakistani general election and Ramadan 1445 AH were approaching, the Pakistan Cricket Board was concerned about the tournament. While they were planning to introduce two more teams into the league, they wanted to shift the tournament to the United Arab Emirates. However, the franchise owners opposed these plans citing the financial reasons. There were proposals for the Arbab Niaz Stadium in Peshawar to host the matches but these did not succeed due to security issues. On 6 February 2024, Mohsin Raza Naqvi was elected as the PCB chairman, who also took the responsibility to supervise the preparations for the tournament.

== Squads ==
The squads were finalized with the draft in Lahore on 13 December 2023, six days after the franchises announced their retained players. A supplementary and replacement draft took place on 29 January 2024.

Islamabad United	Karachi Kings	Lahore Qalandars	Multan Sultans	Peshawar Zalmi	Quetta Gladiators
Shadab Khan (c); Naseem Shah; Jordan Cox (†); Imad Wasim; Azam Khan (†); Virat Kohli; Faheem Ashraf; Alex Hales; Colin Munro; Rumman Raees; Liam Livingstone; Salman Ali Agha; Qasim Akram; Fawad Ahmed; Hunain Shah; Ubaid Shah; Shamyl Hussain; ~~Tom Curran~~ (Note: Player suffered an injury which ruled them out of the tournament.); Obed McCoy; Haider Ali; ~~Muhammad Waseem~~ (Note: Player withdrew from the tournament due to international duty.); Martin Guptill	Shan Masood (c); James Vince (vc); Kieron Pollard; Daniel Sams; Mohammad Nawaz; Hasan Ali; Tim Seifert (†); Shoaib Malik; Tabraiz Shamsi; Mir Hamza; Muhammad Akhlaq (†); Mohammad Amir Khan; Anwar Ali; Arafat Minhas; Irfan Khan; Sirajuddin; Saad Baig; ~~Jamie Overton~~ (Note: Player was unable to participate due to NOC issues.); Leus du Plooy; Mohammad Rohid; Zahid Mahmood; Blessing Muzarabani; Fawad Ali; Imran Tahir	Shaheen Afridi (c); Fakhar Zaman; Rassie van der Dussen; ~~Haris Rauf~~; David Wiese; Sahibzada Farhan; Sikandar Raza; Abdullah Shafique; Zaman Khan; Mirza Tahir Baig; ~~Rashid Khan~~; Mohammad Imran; Ahsan Hafeez; Dan Lawrence; Jahandad Khan; Syed Faridoun; Shai Hope (†); Kamran Ghulam; Bhanuka Rajapaksa; Tayyab Abbas; Lorcan Tucker (†); Salman Fayyaz; Sikandar Raza; Carlos Brathwaite; George Linde; Sam Billings	Mohammad Rizwan (c, †); David Willey (vc); Iftikhar Ahmed; Khushdil Shah; Usama Mir; Dawid Malan; Abbas Afridi; Reeza Hendricks; ~~Reece Topley~~; ~~Ihsanullah~~; Tayyab Tahir; Shahnawaz Dahani; Usman Khan; Mohammad Ali; Faisal Akram; Yasir Khan; Chris Jordan; Aftab Ibrahim; Johnson Charles; Mohammad Shehzad; ~~Olly Stone~~; Ali Majid; Richard Ngarava	Babar Azam (c); Rovman Powell; ~~Noor Ahmad~~; Saim Ayub; Tom Kohler-Cadmore; Asif Ali; Mohammad Haris (†); Aamir Jamal; Naveen-ul-Haq; Khurram Shahzad; Salman Irshad; Arif Yaqoob; Umair Afridi; Dan Mousley; Haseebullah Khan (†); Mohammad Zeeshan; ~~Lungi Ngidi~~; Mehran Mumtaz; Luke Wood; ~~Sufiyan Muqeem~~; Waqar Salamkheil; Arshad Iqbal; Gus Atkinson; Shamar Joseph; Aimal Khan; Paul Walter; Hussain Talat	Rilee Rossouw (c); Saud Shakeel (vc); Sherfane Rutherford; Mohammad Amir; Mohammad Wasim; Jason Roy; ~~Wanindu Hasaranga~~; Mohammad Hasnain; Abrar Ahmed; Sarfaraz Ahmed (†); Will Smeed; Sajjad Ali (†); Usman Qadir; Omair Yousuf; Adil Naz; Khawaja Nafay; Akeal Hosein; Sohail Khan; Laurie Evans; Usman Tariq; Bismillah Khan (†); Umar Amin

== Venues ==
The PCB announced the venues and fixtures on 12 January 2024. The tournament took place across four cities; Karachi, Lahore, Multan and Rawalpindi.

City	Lahore	Multan	Karachi	Rawalpindi
Stadium	Gaddafi Stadium	Multan Cricket Stadium	National Stadium	Rawalpindi Cricket Stadium
Matches	9	5	11	9
Image				
Capacity	27,000	30,000	32,000	15,000
2024 Pakistan Super League is located in Pakistan

== Match officials ==
On 12 February 2024, the PCB announced the list of officials for league stage matches which included 4 members of Elite Panel of ICC Umpires.

=== Umpires ===
- Abdul Moqeet
- Ahsan Raza
- Aleem Dar
- Alex Wharf
- Asif Yaqoob
- Faisal Afridi
- Chris Gaffaney
- Imran Jawed
- Michael Gough
- Mohammad Asif
- Nasir Hussain
- Rashid Riaz
- Richard Illingworth
- Ruchira Palliyaguruge
- Shozab Raza
- Tariq Rasheed

=== Referees ===
- Ali Naqvi
- Muhammad Javed
- Roshan Mahanama

== Marketing ==
=== Title anthem ===
The season's logo variant was revealed on 8 December 2023 with the nomenclature as HBL PSL 9, or hashtag #HBLPSL9, because HBL Pakistan has been its titular sponsor since the league's first season. The title anthem "Khul Ke Khel" features Ali Zafar and Aima Baig. Opening ceremony was held at Gaddafi stadium on 17 February.

=== Trophy ===
The season's trophy, named Orion, was unveiled on 13 February 2024 at Polo Ground, Jilani Park, Lahore. It was made by Lahore-based Mahfooz Jewellers.

=== Broadcast and media ===
Since previous rights concluded after a two-year run, a public merit-based tender for the broadcast and streaming rights was opened on 9 January 2024 for the next two years. ARY Digital Network renewed the broadcast rights with a 45 percent increased bid, and Walee Technologies won the streaming rights with a 113 percent increased bid. (Note: See Indian numbering system and Pakistani rupees. Comparing from the previous deal and keeping inflation in view, the TV rights worth Rs. 630 crore are 8% lower while the digital rights worth Rs. 187.5 crore are 32% higher; at that time, US$1 was equivalent to Rs. 281.22.) While PCB revealed a list of global broadcasters on 16 February, this is the first season which PTV Sports would not broadcast due to not winning the tender.

Ramiz Raja returned this year among seven commentators from Pakistan, and Michael Clarke debuted among eight international commentators. Zainab Abbas and Erin Holland presented the season.

=== Cancer awareness ===
The breast cancer awareness day and the childhood cancer awareness day were observed on 5 and 12 March respectively, with the stadiums themed with the pink ribbon and golden ribbon respectively.

== League stage ==
=== Format ===
Each team played every other team twice in a double round robin format, with the top four teams in the points table advancing to the playoffs.

=== Points table ===
Pos	Team	Pld	W	L	NR	Pts	NRR
1	Multan Sultans (R)	10	7	3	0	14	1.150
2	Peshawar Zalmi (3rd)	10	6	3	1	13	0.147
3	Islamabad United (C)	10	5	4	1	11	0.224
4	Quetta Gladiators (4th)	10	5	4	1	11	−0.921
5	Karachi Kings	10	4	6	0	8	−0.192
6	Lahore Qalandars	10	1	8	1	3	−0.554

Source: ESPNcricinfo

The four top-ranked teams qualified for the Playoffs.
Advanced to Qualifier
Advanced to Eliminator 1

Notes

- C = Champions;
- R = Runner-up;
- (x) = Position at the end of the tournament;

=== Summary ===
Visitor team →	IU	KK	LQ	MS	PZ	QG
Home team ↓	IU	KK	LQ	MS	PZ	QG
Islamabad United		Islamabad; 5 wickets	Lahore; 17 runs	Islamabad; 3 wickets	Islamabad; 29 runs	Match abandoned
Karachi Kings	Islamabad; 7 wickets		Karachi; 3 wickets	Multan; 20 runs	Peshawar; 2 runs	Quetta; 5 wickets
Lahore Qalandars	Islamabad; 8 wickets	Karachi; 2 wickets		Multan; 60 runs	Peshawar; 8 runs	Quetta; 5 wickets
Multan Sultans	Multan; 5 wickets	Multan; 55 runs	Multan; 5 wickets		Peshawar; 5 runs	Multan; 13 runs
Peshawar Zalmi	Peshawar; 8 runs	Karachi; 7 wickets	Match abandoned	Peshawar; 4 runs		Peshawar; 76 runs
Quetta Gladiators	Quetta; 3 wickets	Karachi; 7 wickets	Quetta; 6 wickets	Multan; 79 runs	Quetta; 16 runs	

Home team won	Visitor team won

- Note: Results listed are according to the home (horizontal) and visitor (vertical) teams.
- Note: Click on a result to see a summary of the match.

=== League progression ===
Team	Group matches										Playoffs		
Team	1	2	3	4	5	6	7	8	9	10	E1/Q	E2	F
Islamabad United	2	2	2	2	4	5	7	7	9	11	W	W	W
Karachi Kings	0	2	4	4	4	4	6	6	8	8			
Lahore Qalandars	0	0	0	0	0	0	1	3	3	3			
Multan Sultans	2	4	6	6	8	10	12	12	12	14	W		L
Peshawar Zalmi	0	0	2	4	6	7	7	9	11	13	L	L	
Quetta Gladiators	2	4	6	6	8	9	9	9	11	11	L		

Win	Loss	No result

- Note: The total points at the end of each group match are listed.
- Note: Click on the points (group matches) or W/L (playoffs) to see the match summary.

== Fixtures ==
The PCB announced the fixtures on 12 January 2024.

=== Lahore and Multan ===
Match 1
17 February 2024
20:00 (N)
Scorecard

(H) Lahore Qalandars; 195/5 (20 overs)	v	Islamabad United; 200/2 (18.2 overs)
Rassie van der Dussen 71* (41); Tymal Mills 2/45 (4 overs)		Shadab Khan 74* (41); Salman Fayyaz 1/23 (2.2 overs)

Islamabad United won by 8 wickets
Gaddafi Stadium, Lahore
Umpires: Aleem Dar (Pak) and Michael Gough (Eng)
Player of the match: Shadab Khan (Islamabad United)

- Islamabad United won the toss and elected to field.
- Ubaid Shah (Islamabad United) and Salman Fayyaz (Lahore Qalandars) both made their T20 debuts.

Match 2
18 February 2024
14:00
Scorecard

Quetta Gladiators; 206/5 (20 overs)	v	Peshawar Zalmi; 190/6 (20 overs)
Jason Roy 75 (48); Salman Irshad 3/38 (4 overs)		Babar Azam 68 (42); Abrar Ahmed 2/29 (4 overs)

Quetta Gladiators won by 16 runs
Gaddafi Stadium, Lahore
Umpires: Michael Gough (Eng) and Tariq Rasheed (Pak)
Player of the match: Saud Shakeel (Quetta Gladiators)

- Peshawar Zalmi won the toss and elected to field.
- Mohammad Zeeshan (Peshawar Zalmi) made his T20 debut.

Match 3
18 February 2024
19:00 (N)
Scorecard

(H) Multan Sultans; 185/2 (20 overs)	v	Karachi Kings; 130/8 (20 overs)
Reeza Hendricks 79* (54); Mir Hamza 1/30 (4 overs)		Shoaib Malik 53 (35); Mohammad Ali 3/23 (4 overs)

Multan Sultans won by 55 runs
Multan Cricket Stadium, Multan
Attendance: 22,000
Umpires: Chris Gaffaney (NZ) and Rashid Riaz (Pak)
Player of the match: Reeza Hendricks (Multan Sultans)

- Karachi Kings won the toss and elected to field.
- Saad Baig (Karachi Kings) made his T20 debut.

Match 4
19 February 2024
19:00 (N)
Scorecard

(H) Lahore Qalandars; 187/7 (20 overs)	v	Quetta Gladiators; 188/5 (19.1 overs)
Sahibzada Farhan 62 (43); Akeal Hosein 2/17 (4 overs)		Khawaja Nafay 60* (31); Sikandar Raza 1/25 (3 overs)

Quetta Gladiators won by 5 wickets
Gaddafi Stadium, Lahore
Umpires: Aleem Dar (Pak) and Michael Gough (Eng)
Player of the match: Khawaja Nafay (Quetta Gladiators)

- Lahore Qalandars won the toss and elected to bat.

Match 5
20 February 2024
19:00 (N)
Scorecard

Islamabad United; 144 (20 overs)	v	(H) Multan Sultans; 145/5 (19.5 overs)
Salman Ali Agha 52 (43); Mohammad Ali 3/19 (4 overs)		Reeza Hendricks 58 (46); Naseem Shah 2/27 (4 overs)

Multan Sultans won by 5 wickets
Multan Cricket Stadium, Multan
Umpires: Faisal Afridi (Pak) and Chris Gaffaney (NZ)
Player of the match: Mohammad Ali (Multan Sultans)

- Multan Sultans won the toss and elected to field.

Match 6
21 February 2024
14:00
Scorecard

Peshawar Zalmi; 154 (19.5 overs)	v	Karachi Kings; 157/3 (16.5 overs)
Babar Azam 72 (51); Mir Hamza 3/28 (4 overs)		Kieron Pollard 49* (21); Luke Wood 2/20 (3.5 overs)

Karachi Kings won by 7 wickets
Gaddafi Stadium, Lahore
Umpires: Michael Gough (Eng) and Ahsan Raza (Pak)
Player of the match: Mir Hamza (Karachi Kings)

- Karachi Kings won the toss and elected to field.

Match 7
21 February 2024
19:00 (N)
Scorecard

Lahore Qalandars; 166/5 (20 overs)	v	(H) Multan Sultans; 170/5 (19 overs)
Rassie van der Dussen 54 (37); Mohammad Ali 2/28 (4 overs)		Mohammad Rizwan 82 (59); Shaheen Afridi 2/25 (4 overs)

Multan Sultans won by 5 wickets
Multan Cricket Stadium, Multan
Umpires: Chris Gaffaney (NZ) and Rashid Riaz (Pak)
Player of the match: Mohammad Rizwan (Multan Sultans)

- Lahore Qalandars won the toss and elected to bat.

Match 8
22 February 2024
19:00 (N)
Scorecard

Islamabad United; 138/9 (20 overs)	v	Quetta Gladiators; 139/7 (18.2 overs)
Salman Ali Agha 33 (23); Abrar Ahmed 3/18 (4 overs)		Jason Roy 37 (18); Shadab Khan 2/24 (4 overs)

Quetta Gladiators won by 3 wickets
Gaddafi Stadium, Lahore
Umpires: Aleem Dar (Pak) and Richard Illingworth (Eng)
Player of the match: Rilee Rossouw (Quetta Gladiators)

- Quetta Gladiators won the toss and elected to field.

Match 9
23 February 2024
19:00 (N)
Scorecard

Peshawar Zalmi; 179/8 (20 overs)	v	(H) Multan Sultans; 174 (20 overs)
Haseebullah Khan 37 (18); Mohammad Ali 2/23 (4 overs)		Dawid Malan 52 (25); Arif Yaqoob 3/43 (4 overs)

Peshawar Zalmi won by 5 runs
Multan Cricket Stadium, Multan
Umpires: Faisal Afridi (Pak) and Chris Gaffaney (NZ)
Player of the match: Luke Wood (Peshawar Zalmi)

- Peshawar Zalmi won the toss and elected to bat.

Match 10
24 February 2024
19:00 (N)
Scorecard

(H) Lahore Qalandars; 175/6 (20 overs)	v	Karachi Kings; 176/8 (20 overs)
Sahibzada Farhan 72* (45); Hasan Ali 2/29 (4 overs)		Kieron Pollard 58 (33); Ahsan Hafeez 2/19 (2 overs)

Karachi Kings won by 2 wickets
Gaddafi Stadium, Lahore
Umpires: Richard Illingworth (Eng) and Ahsan Raza (Pak)
Player of the match: Kieron Pollard (Karachi Kings)

- Karachi Kings won the toss and elected to field.

Match 11
25 February 2024
14:00
Scorecard

(H) Multan Sultans; 180/4 (20 overs)	v	Quetta Gladiators; 167/9 (20 overs)
Reeza Hendricks 72 (47); Mohammad Amir 2/46 (4 overs)		Khawaja Nafay 36 (31); Mohammad Ali 3/19 (4 overs)

Multan Sultans won by 13 runs
Multan Cricket Stadium, Multan
Umpires: Faisal Afridi (Pak) and Chris Gaffaney (NZ)
Player of the match: Mohammad Ali (Multan Sultans)

- Quetta Gladiators won the toss and elected to field.

Match 12
25 February 2024
19:00 (N)
Scorecard

Peshawar Zalmi; 211/4 (20 overs)	v	(H) Lahore Qalandars; 203/6 (20 overs)
Saim Ayub 88 (55); Shaheen Afridi 3/33 (4 overs)		Rassie van der Dussen 104* (52); Naveen-ul-Haq 2/50 (4 overs)

Peshawar Zalmi won by 8 runs
Gaddafi Stadium, Lahore
Umpires: Richard Illingworth (Eng) and Ahsan Raza (Pak)
Player of the match: Saim Ayub (Peshawar Zalmi)

- Lahore Qalandars won the toss and elected to field.

Match 13
26 February 2024
19:00 (N)
Scorecard

Peshawar Zalmi; 201/5 (20 overs)	v	Islamabad United; 193/9 (20 overs)
Babar Azam 111* (63); Shadab Khan 2/28 (4 overs)		Azam Khan 75 (30); Arif Yaqoob 5/27 (4 overs)

Peshawar Zalmi won by 8 runs
Gaddafi Stadium, Lahore
Umpires: Richard Illingworth (Eng) and Shozab Raza (Pak)
Player of the match: Babar Azam (Peshawar Zalmi)

- Islamabad United won the toss and elected to field.

Match 14
27 February 2024
19:00 (N)
Scorecard

Multan Sultans; 214/4 (20 overs)	v	(H) Lahore Qalandars; 154 (17 overs)
Usman Khan 96 (55); Shaheen Afridi 2/39 (4 overs)		Sahibzada Farhan 31 (21); Usama Mir 6/40 (4 overs)

Multan Sultans won by 60 runs
Gaddafi Stadium, Lahore
Umpires: Ruchira Palliyaguruge (SL) and Ahsan Raza (Pak)
Player of the match: Usman Khan (Multan Sultans)

- Multan Sultans won the toss and elected to bat.

=== Karachi and Rawalpindi ===
Match 15
28 February 2024
19:00 (N)
Scorecard

(H) Karachi Kings; 165/5 (20 overs)	v	Islamabad United; 169/3 (18.3 overs)
Kieron Pollard 48* (28); Salman Ali Agha 1/17 (2 overs)		Colin Munro 82 (47); Mohammad Nawaz 1/23 (4 overs)

Islamabad United won by 7 wickets
National Stadium, Karachi
Attendance: 20,150
Umpires: Chris Gaffaney (NZ) and Rashid Riaz (Pak)
Player of the match: Colin Munro (Islamabad United)

- Islamabad United won the toss and elected to field.

Match 16
29 February 2024
19:00 (N)
Scorecard

(H) Karachi Kings; 165/8 (20 overs)	v	Quetta Gladiators; 169/5 (20 overs)
James Vince 37 (25); Abrar Ahmed 3/31 (4 overs)		Sherfane Rutherford 58* (31); Zahid Mahmood 2/17 (4 overs)

Quetta Gladiators won by 5 wickets
National Stadium, Karachi
Umpires: Chris Gaffaney (NZ) and Abdul Muqeet (Pak)
Player of the match: Sherfane Rutherford (Quetta Gladiators)

- Quetta Gladiators won the toss and elected to field.

Match 17
2 March 2024
14:00
Scorecard

Peshawar Zalmi	v	Lahore Qalandars

Match abandoned
Rawalpindi Cricket Stadium, Rawalpindi
Umpires: Ruchira Palliyaguruge (SL) and Ahsan Raza (Pak)

- No toss
- No play was possible due to rain.

Match 18
2 March 2024
19:00 (N)
Scorecard

(H) Islamabad United	v	Quetta Gladiators

Match abandoned
Rawalpindi Cricket Stadium, Rawalpindi
Umpires: Richard Illingworth (Eng) and Asif Yaqoob (Pak)

- No toss
- No play was possible due to rain.

Match 19
3 March 2024
19:00 (N)
Scorecard

Multan Sultans; 189/3 (20 overs)	v	(H) Karachi Kings; 169/7 (20 overs)
Usman Khan 106* (59); Blessing Muzarabani 2/32 (4 overs)		Shoaib Malik 38 (28); Usama Mir 2/29 (4 overs)

Multan Sultans won by 20 runs
National Stadium, Karachi
Umpires: Faisal Afridi (Pak) and Chris Gaffaney (NZ)
Player of the match: Usman Khan (Multan Sultans)

- Multan Sultans won the toss and elected to bat.
- As a result of this match, Multan Sultans qualified for the playoffs.

Match 20
4 March 2024
19:00 (N)
Scorecard

(H) Islamabad United; 196/4 (20 overs)	v	Peshawar Zalmi; 167/9 (20 overs)
Shadab Khan 80 (51); Saim Ayub 2/15 (2 overs)		Aamir Jamal 87 (49); Shadab Khan 3/41 (4 overs)

Islamabad United won by 29 runs
Rawalpindi Cricket Stadium, Rawalpindi
Attendance: 14,200
Umpires: Richard Illingworth (Eng) and Asif Yaqoob (Pak)
Player of the match: Shadab Khan (Islamabad United)

- Peshawar Zalmi won the toss and elected to field.

Match 21
5 March 2024
19:00 (N)
Scorecard

Peshawar Zalmi; 204/5 (20 overs)	v	Multan Sultans; 200/5 (20 overs)
Babar Azam 64 (40); Usama Mir 3/32 (4 overs)		Iftikhar Ahmed 60* (27); Aamir Jamal 2/36 (4 overs)

Peshawar Zalmi won by 4 runs
Rawalpindi Cricket Stadium, Rawalpindi
Attendance: 14,650
Umpires: Richard Illingworth (Eng) and Alex Wharf (Eng)
Player of the match: Babar Azam (Peshawar Zalmi)

- Peshawar Zalmi won the toss and elected to bat.

Match 22
6 March 2024
14:00
Scorecard

Quetta Gladiators; 118 (19.1 overs)	v	Karachi Kings; 121/3 (15.3 overs)
Saud Shakeel 33 (28); Hasan Ali 4/15 (4 overs)		Tim Seifert 49 (31); Mohammad Amir 1/23 (2 overs)

Karachi Kings won by 7 wickets
Rawalpindi Cricket Stadium, Rawalpindi
Umpires: Richard Illingworth (Eng) and Asif Yaqoob (Pak)
Player of the match: Hasan Ali (Karachi Kings)

- Karachi Kings won the toss and elected to field.
- As a result of this match, Lahore Qalandars were eliminated from the tournament.

Match 23
6 March 2024
19:00 (N)
Scorecard

Lahore Qalandars; 162/7 (20 overs)	v	(H) Islamabad United; 145 (18.5 overs)
Rassie van der Dussen 64 (44); Rumman Raees 2/19 (3 overs)		Faheem Ashraf 41* (31); Zaman Khan 4/37 (3.5 overs)

Lahore Qalandars won by 17 runs
Rawalpindi Cricket Stadium, Rawalpindi
Umpires: Ahsan Raza (Pak) and Alex Wharf (Eng)
Player of the match: Rassie van der Dussen (Lahore Qalandars)

- Islamabad United won the toss and elected to field.
- Tayyab Abbas (Lahore Qalandars) made his T20 debut.

Match 24
7 March 2024
19:00 (N)
Scorecard

Karachi Kings; 150/7 (20 overs)	v	(H) Islamabad United; 151/5 (18.4 overs)
Kieron Pollard 39 (28); Tymal Mills 3/34 (4 overs)		Shadab Khan 34 (26); Mir Hamza 3/41 (4 overs)

Islamabad United won by 5 wickets
Rawalpindi Cricket Stadium, Rawalpindi
Umpires: Ruchira Palliyaguruge (SL) and Alex Wharf (Eng)
Player of the match: Faheem Ashraf (Islamabad United)

- Islamabad United won the toss and elected to field.

Match 25
8 March 2024
19:00 (N)
Scorecard

(H) Peshawar Zalmi; 196/8 (20 overs)	v	Quetta Gladiators; 120 (17.5 overs)
Babar Azam 53 (30); Akeal Hosein 4/23 (4 overs)		Saud Shakeel 24 (12); Khurram Shahzad 2/15 (2.5 overs)

Peshawar Zalmi won by 76 runs
Rawalpindi Cricket Stadium, Rawalpindi
Umpires: Alex Wharf (Eng) and Asif Yaqoob (Pak)
Player of the match: Saim Ayub (Peshawar Zalmi)

- Quetta Gladiators won the toss and elected to field.
- Akeal Hosein (Quetta Gladiators) took a hat-trick.
- As a result of this match, Peshawar Zalmi qualified for the playoffs.

Match 26
9 March 2024
19:00 (N)
Scorecard

Lahore Qalandars; 177/5 (20 overs)	v	(H) Karachi Kings; 179/7 (20 overs)
Abdullah Shafique 55 (39); Zahid Mahmood 2/27 (4 overs)		James Vince 42 (27); Tayyab Abbas 2/23 (3 overs)

Karachi Kings won by 3 wickets
National Stadium, Karachi
Umpires: Richard Illingworth (Eng) and Rashid Riaz (Pak)
Player of the match: Irfan Khan (Karachi Kings)

- Karachi Kings won the toss and elected to field.

Match 27
10 March 2024
14:00
Scorecard

Multan Sultans; 228/4 (20 overs)	v	(H) Islamabad United; 232/7 (20 overs)
Usman Khan 100* (50); Faheem Ashraf 2/32 (3 overs)		Colin Munro 84 (40); Abbas Afridi 3/40 (4 overs)

Islamabad United won by 3 wickets
Rawalpindi Cricket Stadium, Rawalpindi
Umpires: Mohammad Asif (Pak) and Ruchira Palliyaguruge (SL)
Player of the match: Colin Munro (Islamabad United)

- Islamabad United won the toss and elected to field.
- As a result of this match, Islamabad United qualified for the playoffs.

Match 28
10 March 2024
19:00 (N)
Scorecard

Lahore Qalandars; 166/4 (20 overs)	v	Quetta Gladiators; 169/4 (20 overs)
Abdullah Shafique 59* (39); Abrar Ahmed 2/31 (4 overs)		Saud Shakeel 88* (65); Jahandad Khan 2/30 (4 overs)

Quetta Gladiators won by 6 wickets
National Stadium, Karachi
Umpires: Chris Gaffaney (NZ) and Rashid Riaz (Pak)
Player of the match: Saud Shakeel (Quetta Gladiators)

- Lahore Qalandars won the toss and elected to bat.
- As a result of this match, Quetta Gladiators qualified for the playoffs and Karachi Kings were eliminated from the tournament.

Match 29
11 March 2024
21:00 (N)
Scorecard

Peshawar Zalmi; 147/6 (20 overs)	v	(H) Karachi Kings; 145/5 (20 overs)
Babar Azam 51 (46); Arafat Minhas 1/11 (4 overs)		Tim Seifert 41 (30); Naveen-ul-Haq 2/22 (4 overs)

Peshawar Zalmi won by 2 runs
National Stadium, Karachi
Umpires: Faisal Afridi (Pak) and Alex Wharf (Eng)
Player of the match: Babar Azam (Peshawar Zalmi)

- Peshawar Zalmi won the toss and elected to bat.

Match 30
12 March 2024
21:00 (N)
Scorecard

Multan Sultans; 185/4 (20 overs)	v	Quetta Gladiators; 106 (15.5 overs)
Mohammad Rizwan 69 (47); Mohammad Amir 2/40 (4 overs)		Omair Yousuf 37 (25); David Willey 3/22 (4 overs)

Multan Sultans won by 79 runs
National Stadium, Karachi
Umpires: Richard Illingworth (Eng) and Rashid Riaz (Pak)
Player of the match: Mohammad Rizwan (Multan Sultans)

- Quetta Gladiators won the toss and elected to field.

== Playoffs ==
Qualifier
14 March — Karachi
2	Peshawar Zalmi	146/7 (20 overs)
1	Multan Sultans	147/3 (18.3 overs)
Eliminator 1
15 March — Karachi
3	Islamabad United	174/9 (20 overs)
4	Quetta Gladiators	135 (18.4 overs)

Eliminator 2
16 March — Karachi
2	Peshawar Zalmi	185/5 (20 overs)
3	Islamabad United	189/5 (19 overs)

Final
18 March — Karachi
1	Multan Sultans	159/9 (20 overs)
3	Islamabad United	163/8 (20 overs)

=== Qualifier ===
Match 31
14 March 2024
21:00 (N)
Scorecard

Peshawar Zalmi; 146/7 (20 overs)	v	Multan Sultans; 147/3 (18.3 overs)
Babar Azam 46 (42); Usama Mir 2/16 (4 overs)		Yasir Khan 54 (37); Aamir Jamal 1/23 (3 overs)

Multan Sultans won by 7 wickets
National Stadium, Karachi
Umpires: Aleem Dar (Pak) and Richard Illingworth (Eng)
Player of the match: Usama Mir (Multan Sultans)

- Peshawar Zalmi won the toss and elected to bat.

=== Eliminators ===
==== Eliminator 1 ====
Match 32
15 March 2024
21:00 (N)
Scorecard

Islamabad United; 174/9 (20 overs)	v	Quetta Gladiators; 135 (18.4 overs)
Martin Guptill 56 (47); Mohammad Amir 2/20 (4 overs)		Omair Yousuf 50 (37); Imad Wasim 3/12 (4 overs)

Islamabad United won by 39 runs
National Stadium, Karachi
Umpires: Chris Gaffaney (NZ) and Ahsan Raza (Pak)
Player of the match: Imad Wasim (Islamabad United)

- Islamabad United won the toss and elected to bat.

==== Eliminator 2 ====
Match 33
16 March 2024
21:00 (N)
Scorecard

Peshawar Zalmi; 185/5 (20 overs)	v	Islamabad United; 189/5 (19 overs)
Saim Ayub 73 (44); Naseem Shah 3/30 (4 overs)		Imad Wasim 59* (40); Saim Ayub 2/34 (3 overs)

Islamabad United won by 5 wickets
National Stadium, Karachi
Umpires: Richard Illingworth (Eng) and Asif Yaqoob (Pak)
Player of the match: Imad Wasim (Islamabad United)

- Islamabad United won the toss and elected to field.

=== Final ===
Match 34
18 March 2024
21:00 (N)
Scorecard

Multan Sultans; 159/9 (20 overs)	v	Islamabad United; 163/8 (20 overs)
Usman Khan 57 (40); Imad Wasim 5/23 (4 overs)		Martin Guptill 50 (32); Iftikhar Ahmed 2/19 (3 overs)

Islamabad United won by 2 wickets
National Stadium, Karachi
Umpires: Chris Gaffaney (NZ) and Richard Illingworth (Eng)
Player of the match: Imad Wasim (Islamabad United)

- Multan Sultans won the toss and elected to bat.
- By winning in the final, Islamabad United became the most successful team in PSL history.

== Awards and statistics ==
=== Most runs ===
Player	Team	Inns	Runs	HS	Ave
Babar Azam	Peshawar Zalmi	11	569	111*	56.90
Usman Khan	Multan Sultans	7	430	106*	107.50
Mohammad Rizwan	Multan Sultans	12	407	82	33.91
Rassie van der Dussen	Lahore Qalandars	7	364	104*	72.80
Saim Ayub	Peshawar Zalmi	11	345	88	31.36

- Source: ESPNcricinfo

=== Most wickets ===
Player	Team	Inns	Wkts	BBI	Ave
Usama Mir	Multan Sultans	11	24	6/40	15.66
Mohammad Ali	Multan Sultans	11	18	3/19	18.17
Abrar Ahmed	Quetta Gladiators	10	16	3/18	19.56
Akeal Hosein	Quetta Gladiators	10	15	4/23	20.53
Naseem Shah	Islamabad United	10	15	3/30	20.53

- Source: ESPNcricinfo

=== End of season awards ===
The winner and the runner-up teams were awarded with Rs. 14 crore and Rs. 5.6 crore respectively. Babar Azam and Usama Mir were presented with the Hanif Mohammad and Fazal Mahmood caps respectively with a complete installation of 6 kW solar system for each. While Shadab Khan received Rs. 30 lakh for being Player of the Tournament, the other awards included Rs. 35 lakh cash prizes. (Note: At that time, US$1 was equivalent to Rs. 278.64.)

Name	Team	Award
Shadab Khan	Islamabad United	Player of the Tournament
Usman Khan	Multan Sultans	Batsman of the tournament
Usama Mir	Multan Sultans	Bowler of the tournament
Saim Ayub	Peshawar Zalmi	All-rounder of the tournament
Azam Khan	Islamabad United	Wicket-keeper of the tournament
Irfan Khan	Karachi Kings	Fielder of the tournament
Irfan Khan	Karachi Kings	Emerging player of the tournament
Asif Yaqoob	—N/a	Umpire of the tournament
—N/a	Peshawar Zalmi	Spirit of cricket

=== Team of the tournament ===
The team of the tournament was announced soon afterwards, with Shadab Khan as the captain and Mohammad Rizwan as the 12th player.

Players
- Saim Ayub
- Babar Azam
- Usman Khan
- Shadab Khan (c)
- Iftikhar Ahmed
- Imad Wasim
- Irfan Khan
- Chris Jordan
- David Willey
- Usama Mir
- Naseem Shah
- Mohammad Rizwan (12th man)

== Controversies ==
=== Pro-Palestine remarks ===
Since KFC Pakistan was announced as a snack partner for the tournament on 17 February, people started criticizing the PCB, and hashtag #BoycottPSL became a social trending topic due to the original KFC's parent company Yum! Brands' affiliation with Pro-Israeli stances during the Gaza war and genocide. Afterwards, the spectators also complained that they were barred to carry the Pro-Palestinian banners in the stadium.

=== Arrests of fans ===
In another incident, fans were arrested for chanting slogans in support of Imran Khan during the matches. This was notable because Imran Khan, a former cricketer, former prime minister, and a prominent political leader, was in jail at that time, and referring to him was prohibited on Pakistani television and media.

=== DRS error ===
Hawk-Eye, the technology used for the Decision Review System (DRS) in cricket, made a human error during the match between Quetta Gladiators and Islamabad United. Inaccurate ball tracking data resulted in incorrect results, causing frustration among players and fans alike.
