= Arif Yaqoob =

Pakistani cricketer

Personal information
- Full name: Arif Yaqoob
- Born: 25 October 1994 (age 32); Karachi, Sindh, Pakistan
- Batting: Right-handed
- Bowling: Right-arm leg break
- Role: Bowler

Domestic team information
- Years: Team
- 2023–present: Karachi Whites
- 2023: SNGPL
- 2024–2025: Peshawar Zalmi

Career statistics
Competition	First-class	List A	T20
Matches	5	1	27
Runs scored	21	–	19
Batting average	4.20	–	9.50
100s/50s	0/0	0/0	0/0
Top score	8	–	9*
Balls bowled	1,320	24	536
Wickets	27	0	42
Bowling average	34.37	–	15.35
5 wickets in innings	1	0	1
10 wickets in match	1	0	0
Best bowling	6/80	–	5/27
Catches/stumpings	2/–	0/–	4/–
- Source: ESPNcricinfo, 5 April 2024

Arif Yaqoob (born 25 October 1994) is a Pakistani cricketer, who is a right-arm leg break bowler. He plays for Karachi Whites in domestic cricket.

== Career ==
Yaqoob made his Twenty20 debut for Karachi Whites on 24 November 2023, against Islamabad in the 2023–24 National T20 Cup. In December 2023, he was named in Sui Northern Gas Pipelines Limited's squad for the 2023–24 President's Trophy. He made his first-class debut for SNGPL on 22 December 2023, against Pakistan Television, taking his maiden five-wicket haul in PTV's second innings. He finished his debut match with a ten-wicket haul for 117 runs, leading SNGPL to an eight-wicket win over PTV.

In January 2024, he was picked by Peshawar Zalmi following the players' draft, to play for them in the 2024 Pakistan Super League. On 27 February 2024, he achieved his maiden five-wicket haul in T20 cricket, against Islamabad United. Taking figures of 5/27, he became the second bowler to take a five-wicket haul for Peshawar Zalmi. He picked up four wickets in the 19th over of Islamabad's innings, becoming the first bowler in the history of Pakistan Super League to take four wickets in an over.
