= Mohammad Shahid (Pakistani cricketer) =

Pakistani cricketer (born 2000)

Personal information
- Born: 24 August 2000 (age 26); Hub, Balochistan, Pakistan
- Batting: Right-handed
- Bowling: Right-arm medium
- Role: All-rounder

Domestic team information
- Years: Team
- 2021/22: Balochistan
- 2023/24: Dera Murad Jamali

Career statistics
Competition	LA	T20
Matches	3	4
Runs scored	31	31
Batting average	15.50	7.75
100s/50s	0/0	0/0
Top score	21	19
Balls bowled	78	66
Wickets	2	3
Bowling average	36.50	32.00
5 wickets in innings	0	0
10 wickets in match	0	0
Best bowling	2/56	2/37
Catches/stumpings	2/–	3/–
- Source: Cricinfo, 24 September 2022

Mohammad Shahid (Urdu: محمد شاہد; born 24 August 2000) is a Pakistani cricketer who plays for Dera Murad Jamali. Shahid made his List A debut for Balochistan against Sindh on 4 March 2022 during the 2021–22 Pakistan Cup. He made his T20 debut for Dera Murad Jamali against Hyderabad on 24 November 2023 during the 2023–24 National T20 Cup.
