= Sohaibullah =

Pakistani cricketer (born 1996)

Personal information
- Full name: Sohaibullah
- Born: 20 March 1996 (age 30)
- Batting: Left-handed
- Bowling: Left-arm Medium
- Role: Bowler
- Source: ESPNcricinfo, 22 October 2016

Sohaibullah (born 20 March 1996) is a Pakistani cricketer. He made his first-class debut for Water and Power Development Authority in the 2016–17 Quaid-e-Azam Trophy on 22 October 2016. He made his List A debut for Khan Research Laboratories in the 2018–19 Quaid-e-Azam One Day Cup on 13 September 2018. He made his Twenty20 debut for Rawalpindi in the 2018–19 National T20 Cup on 10 December 2018.

In January 2021, he was named in Central Punjab's squad for the 2020–21 Pakistan Cup.
