= Khawaja Nafay =

Pakistani cricketer (born 2002)

Personal information
- Full name: Khawaja Muhammad Nafay
- Born: 13 February 2002 (age 24); Karachi, Sindh, Pakistan
- Batting: Right-handed
- Bowling: Right-arm Offbreak
- Role: Batsman

International information
- National side: Pakistan (2026–present)
- T20I debut (cap 125): 11 January 2026 v Sri Lanka
- Last T20I: 28 February 2026 v Sri Lanka

Domestic team information
- Years: Team
- 2022–present: Overseas Warriors
- 2023–present: Chattogram Challengers
- 2024–present: Quetta Gladiators (squad no. 999)

Career statistics
Competition	T20I	FC	LA	T20
Matches	4	5	2	37
Runs scored	54	143	6	790
Batting average	13.50	20.42	3.00	23.93
100s/50s	0/0	1/0	0/0	0/7
Top score	26	103*	6	68
Catches/stumpings	1/1	3/–	1/–	17/1
- Source: ESPNcricinfo, 8 March 2026

Khawaja Muhammad Nafay (born 13 February 2002) is a Pakistani cricketer, who is a right-handed batter and wicket-keeper. He was born in Karachi and was coached by Liaquat Khan. He was part of the Overseas Warriors in the 2022 Kashmir Premier League. He made his debut for the Pakistan National Cricket Team on 11 January 2026 against Sri Lanka.

== Franchise career ==
In January 2023, Nafay was signed by Chattogram Challengers to play for the franchise in the 2022–23 Bangladesh Premier League. He made his Twenty20 debut for Chattogram Challengers on 20 January 2023, against Khulna Tigers. This was the first time that he participated in a major cricket tournament at the professional level.

Nafay was invited to join Quetta Gladiators after the team management reviewed his batting videos on Facebook. In December 2023, he was picked by Quetta Gladiators following the players' draft to play for them in the 2024 Pakistan Super League. On 19 February 2024, he scored 60 runs off 31 balls against Lahore Qalandars, recording his maiden T20 half-century. He played only one dot ball in that innings to became the first player in the history of the PSL to face just one dot ball in an innings of more than 30 balls.
