= Zahid Mahmood =

Pakistani cricketer

Personal information
- Born: 20 March 1988 (age 38); Dadu, Sindh, Pakistan
- Batting: Right-handed
- Bowling: Leg break
- Role: Bowler

International information
- National side: Pakistan (2021–present)
- Test debut (cap 251): 1 December 2022 v England
- Last Test: 15 October 2024 v England
- ODI debut (cap 233): 29 March 2022 v Australia
- Last ODI: 21 August 2022 v Netherlands
- ODI shirt no.: 85
- Only T20I (cap 90): 14 February 2021 v South Africa
- T20I shirt no.: 85

Domestic team information
- Years: Team
- 2009/10: Hyderabad
- 2019/20–2023: Southern Punjab
- 2020–2021: Quetta Gladiators
- 2022: Islamabad United (squad no. 85)

Career statistics
Competition	Test	ODI	T20I	FC
Matches	4	4	1	72
Runs scored	20	9	–	756
Batting average	4.00	9.00	–	10.21
100s/50s	0/0	0/0	–	0/2
Top score	17	9	–	60*
Balls bowled	471	216	24	12,466
Wickets	13	4	3	219
Bowling average	38.84	55.00	13.33	36.38
5 wickets in innings	0	0	0	8
10 wickets in match	0	0	0	1
Best bowling	4/235	2/59	3/40	6/57
Catches/stumpings	0/–	0/–	0/–	20/–
- Source: Cricinfo, 16 November 2024

Zahid Mahmood (Sindhi: زاهد محمود ڀٽي; born 20 March 1988) is a Pakistani cricketer who plays for Southern Punjab. He made his international debut for the Pakistan cricket team in February 2021 in a T20I against South Africa. He made his Test debut against England in December 2022.

== Early life and education ==
He was born in Dadu to a father who is a retired government employee from NADRA. He received his early education from Ustad Bukhari Degree College, in Dadu, Sindh.

He also holds a degree in physical education from University of Sindh.

== Domestic career ==
He made his first-class debut for Hyderabad in the 2009–10 Quaid-e-Azam Trophy on 9 November 2009, making a duck in the first innings and finishing 16 not out in the second. He finished his maiden first-class season with twenty-nine runs and four wickets from three matches. He made his List A debut for Hyderabad in the Royal Bank of Scotland Cup in the 2009–10 season, taking two wickets.

In September 2019, he was named in Southern Punjab's squad for the 2019–20 Quaid-e-Azam Trophy tournament. In October 2020, during the first round of matches in the 2020–21 Quaid-e-Azam Trophy, Zahid took his 100th wicket in first-class cricket. In the same game he also took his first ten-wicket match haul. In December 2020, he was shortlisted as one of the Domestic Cricketers of the Year for the 2020 PCB Awards.

== International career ==
In January 2021, he was named in Pakistan's Twenty20 International (T20I) squad for their series against South Africa. He made his T20I debut for Pakistan, against South Africa, on 14 February 2021. In March 2021, he was named in Pakistan's Test squad for their series against Zimbabwe. In June 2021, he was also named in Pakistan's Test squad for the series against the West Indies. In September 2021, he was named in Pakistan's One Day International (ODI) squad for their series against New Zealand. The following month, he was named in the Pakistan Shaheens squad for their tour of Sri Lanka.

In November 2021, he was named in Pakistan's Test squad for their series against Bangladesh. In February 2022, he was also named in Pakistan's Test squad for their series against Australia. The following month, Zahid was added to Pakistan's limited overs squad, also for the matches against Australia. He made his ODI debut on 29 March 2022, for Pakistan against Australia.
