= Aamir Jamal =

Pakistani cricketer (born 1996)

Personal information
- Born: 5 July 1996 (age 30); Mianwali, Punjab, Pakistan
- Batting: Right-handed
- Bowling: Right-arm fast-medium
- Role: All-rounder

International information
- National side: Pakistan (2022–present)
- Test debut (cap 254): 14 December 2023 v Australia
- Last Test: 25 July 2026 v West Indies
- ODI debut (cap 245): 22 November 2024 v Zimbabwe
- Last ODI: 28 November 2024 v Zimbabwe
- ODI shirt no.: 65
- T20I debut (cap 98): 28 September 2022 v England
- Last T20I: 14 January 2024 v New Zealand
- T20I shirt no.: 65

Domestic team information
- Years: Team
- 2019–2023: Northern cricket team
- 2022–2024–2026: Peshawar Zalmi
- 2023–present: Lahore Whites
- 2024: Warwickshire
- 2025: Karachi Kings

Career statistics
Competition	Test	ODI	T20I	FC
Matches	9	3	6	49
Runs scored	355	5	88	1,333
Batting average	23.66	–	22.00	20.19
100s/50s	0/2	0/0	0/0	0/4
Top score	82	5*	41	82
Balls bowled	1,043	96	101	6,609
Wickets	23	3	2	131
Bowling average	35.21	28.33	93.50	31.67
5 wickets in innings	2	0	0	5
10 wickets in match	0	0	0	0
Best bowling	6/69	2/19	1/13	8/120
Catches/stumpings	5/–	0/–	1/–	31/–
- Source: Cricinfo, 31 August 2026

Aamir Jamal (born 5 July 1996) is a Pakistani cricketer who plays as a right-arm fast-medium bowler for the Pakistan national cricket team.

== Early life ==
Born in Mianwali, Punjab, Aamir Jamal played most of his cricket in and around Rawalpindi, beginning his domestic career in 2013 with inter-region Under-19 and departmental Under-19 tournaments.

== Domestic career ==
After performing for the Pakistan U19 team, he played club cricket and league cricket in England. In the 2016/17 season, he played for Hawkesbury Cricket Club in Sydney Grade Cricket competition.

Returning to Pakistan, and not getting enough opportunities to play Grade II matches, he purchased a car on loan from a bank and used to be an online taxi driver to financially support himself and his family.

Jamal made his first-class debut for Pakistan Television in the 2018–19 Quaid-e-Azam Trophy on 1 September 2018. He made his List A debut for Pakistan Television in the 2018–19 Quaid-e-Azam One Day Cup on 22 September 2018.

In 2019, Jamal played for Doncaster Town in the ECB Yorkshire South Premier League. In January 2021, he was named in Northern's squad for the 2020–21 Pakistan Cup. During the summers of 2021 and 2022 he played for Whiston PCCC in the Yorkshire South Championship and Premier League. In April 2024, Jamal signed for Warwickshire County Cricket Club to represent them in the initial rounds of the 2024 County Championship and the group stage of the 2024 T20 Blast.

Jamal played for Markhor IT Solutions when they competed at first-class level for the first time in the 2026–27 President's Trophy Grade-I. He won the award for player of the final when he took 7 for 32 in the State Bank of Pakistan first innings and made 55 in Markhor IT's second innings to help them win the championship by 51 runs.

== International career ==
In September 2022, Jamal was named in Pakistan's Twenty20 International (T20I) squad for the series against England. He made his T20I debut on 28 September 2022, against England.

In June 2023, Jamal was named in the Pakistani Test squad for the series against Sri Lanka. He was again called up to Pakistan's Test squad in November 2023 for a 3-match Test series against Australia, and made his debut in the first Test on 14 December 2023. He took 6/111 in the first innings, becoming the 14th bowler for Pakistan to take a five-wicket haul on Test debut. In the second and third Tests, Jamal proved himself as a worthy lower-order batter, highlighted by an impressive 82 in Sydney which featured a switch hit for six off Nathan Lyon.

During the Sydney Test, Jamal became the second Pakistani cricketer, after Imran Khan, to score 80-plus runs and take a six-wicket innings haul in the same match. Imran had achieved this feat in a Test match against India in 1983.
