= Mohammad Ali (cricketer, born 1992) =

Pakistani cricketer (born 1992)

Personal information
- Born: 1 November 1992 (age 34); Sialkot, Punjab, Pakistan
- Height: 6 ft 1 in (185 cm)
- Batting: Right-handed
- Bowling: Right-arm medium-fast
- Role: Bowler

International information
- National side: Pakistan (2022–present)
- Test debut (cap 249): 1 December 2022 v England
- Last Test: 9 September 2026 v England
- Only ODI (cap 252): 29 March 2025 v New Zealand
- T20I debut (cap 121): 16 March 2025 v New Zealand
- Last T20I: 26 March 2025 v New Zealand

Domestic team information
- Years: Team
- 2022: Central Punjab (squad no. 122)
- 2023–present: Faisalabad (squad no. 13)
- 2024: Multan Sultans
- 2024: Kandy Falcons
- 2025-present: Fortune Barishal
- 2025: Peshawar Zalmi
- 2026: Hyderabad Kingsmen
- 2026: Nottinghamshire

Career statistics
Competition	Test	ODI	T20I	FC
Matches	9	1	3	72
Runs scored	24	0	1	432
Batting average	3.00	–	–	7.85
100s/50s	0/0	0/0	0/0	0/0
Top score	8	0*	1*	24*
Balls bowled	1,519	60	42	12,643
Wickets	23	1	1	265
Bowling average	42.00	53.00	86.00	25.58
5 wickets in innings	0	0	0	12
10 wickets in match	0	0	0	2
Best bowling	4/50	1/53	1/34	6/52
Catches/stumpings	4/–	0/–	0/–	15/–
- Source: Cricinfo, 26 September 2026

Mohammad Ali (born 1 November 1992) is a Pakistani cricketer who has played for the national team in all three formats. He made his Test debut against England in December 2022.

== Early life and education ==
Born in Sialkot, Punjab, Ali joined Aamer Wasim's cricket club, and after his death he joined the city's Tony Cricket Club prior to making his Grade II and first-class debuts in 2018. Ali has done his Bachelor of Arts in English literature, being particularly influenced by Ernest Hemingway’s novella The Old Man and The Sea (1952).

== Domestic career ==
=== Pakistan ===
Ali made his first-class debut for Zarai Taraqiati Bank Limited in the 2018–19 Quaid-e-Azam Trophy on 1 September 2018. He was the leading wicket-taker for Zarai Taraqiati Bank Limited in the tournament, with twenty-five dismissals in five matches. He made his List A debut for Zarai Taraqiati Bank Limited in the 2018–19 Quaid-e-Azam One Day Cup on 8 October 2018. In April 2023, he was named in Pakistan A's squad for their first-class and List A series against Zimbabwe.

During the 2025-26 domestic season, Ali became the first bowler to take more than 100 wickets in a single Pakistani first-class season since Wasim Akram in 1998-99.

=== England ===
In January 2026, he agreed a short-term contract to join England's Nottinghamshire County Cricket Club as an overseas player for the final two months of that year's County Championship season.

== International career ==
On 16 March 2025, he made his T20I debut against New Zealand at Hagley Oval, during Pakistan's away tour.

During Pakistan's tour of the West Indies in July 2026, Ali made a comeback to the Test squad after nearly two years, claiming 4 for 50 in the first innings of the first match, and was noted for his outswinger.
