= Omair Yousuf =

Pakistani cricketer (born 1998)

Personal information
- Full name: Omair Bin Yousuf
- Born: 27 December 1998 (age 27); Karachi, Sindh, Pakistan
- Height: 5 ft 7.5 in (171 cm)
- Batting: Right-handed
- Role: Batsman

International information
- National side: Pakistan (2023–2025)
- T20I debut (cap 106): 3 October 2023 v Hong Kong
- Last T20I: 26 March 2025 v Zimbabwe
- T20I shirt no.: 30

Domestic team information
- Years: Team
- 2019–2023: Sindh
- 2020: Quetta Gladiators
- 2025: Karachi Kings

Career statistics
Competition	T20I	FC	LA	T20
Matches	7	55	69	41
Runs scored	91	3,553	1,869	1,031
Batting average	18.20	39.69	31,15	32.21
100s/50s	0/0	11/12	1/10	0/6
Top score	24	250*	153	78*
Balls bowled	0	150	20	0
Wickets	0	2	1	0
Bowling average	–	28.00	27.00	–
5 wickets in innings	0	0	0	0
10 wickets in match	–	0	–
Best bowling	–	1/10	1/9	–
Catches/stumpings	3/0	42/–	27/–	28/–
- Source: ESPNcricinfo, 19 March 2025

Omair Bin Yousuf (born 27 December 1998) is a Pakistani cricketer. He made his List A debut for Karachi Whites in the 2018–19 Quaid-e-Azam One Day Cup on 13 September 2018. He made his first-class debut for Karachi Whites in the 2018–19 Quaid-e-Azam Trophy on 16 September 2018.

In September 2019, he was named in Sindh's squad for the 2019–20 Quaid-e-Azam Trophy tournament. In November 2019, he was named in Pakistan's squad for the 2019 ACC Emerging Teams Asia Cup in Bangladesh. In the semi-final of that tournament, he was the highest scorer from his side, scoring 66 runs off 97 balls, as Pakistan knocked India out of the competition. In October 2021, he was named in the Pakistan Shaheens squad for their tour of Sri Lanka.
