= 2025–26 Quaid-e-Azam Trophy =

Pakistani cricket competition

- Official logo
- Dates: 6 October – 5 December 2025
- Administrator: Pakistan Cricket Board
- Cricket format: First-class
- Tournament format(s): Round-robin, final
- Champions: Karachi Blues (10th title)
- Runners-up: Sialkot
- Participants: 10
- Matches: 46
- Player of the series: Saad Baig
- Most runs: Saad Baig (1000)
- Most wickets: Ali Usman (48)

The 2025–26 Quaid-e-Azam Trophy is a first-class domestic cricket competition in Pakistan is being played during the 2025–26 cricketing season from 6 October to 3 December 2025. It is the 68th edition of the Quaid-e-Azam Trophy, and it is contested by 10 teams representing regional cricket associations.

Sialkot are the defending champions, having won the previous season.

== Background ==
For the 2025–26 season, the PCB announced a revamped domestic cricket structure, reducing the number of teams in the Quaid-e-Azam Trophy from 18 in the 2024–25 season to ten, aiming to elevate the standard of competition. This decision followed criticism of the previous season's expanded format, which included 18 teams across three pools, leading to concerns about dilution of quality. The new structure emphasizes merit-based participation, with six teams retained from the previous season's standings and four additional teams qualifying through the 2025 Hanif Mohammad Trophy, a non-first-class tournament featuring 12 regional sides. The 2025–26 Quaid-e-Azam Trophy will feature 46 four-day matches across five venues, with the top performers from the Hanif Mohammad Trophy held from 15 August to 17 September 2025, earning spots in the tournament. This qualification system is designed to reward performance and ensure that only the most in-form teams compete in the premier first-class event. The PCB has highlighted that the restructured format aims to foster a high-performance culture, with top performers from the Hanif Mohammad Trophy also considered for domestic contracts and guest player roles in the Quaid-e-Azam Trophy.

== Teams and qualification ==
The ten participating teams for the 2025–26 season include six retained regional sides based on their performance in the 2024–25 season, and the remaining four spots were filled by the top two teams from each group of the 2025 Hanif Mohammad Trophy, along with two more teams with the highest points. As a result, Karachi Blues (96) and Multan (86) joined respective group toppers FATA and Faisalabad in qualifying for the 2025–26 Quaid-e-Azam Trophy on the virtue of finishing as the next two teams with the most points. The 2025 Hanif Mohammad Trophy included 12 regional cricket teams: Abbottabad, Azad Jammu & Kashmir, Bahawalpur, Dera Murad Jamali, Faisalabad, Hyderabad, Karachi Region Blues, Karachi Region Whites, Lahore Region Blues, Larkana, Multan, and Quetta. This selection process underscores the PCB's focus on competitive merit and regional representation.

List of teams qualified for the 2025–26 Quaid-e-Azam Trophy
Method of qualification	Berths	Teams
2024–25 Quaid-e-Azam Trophy (Top 6 teams from the previous tournament)	6	Abbottabad
2024–25 Quaid-e-Azam Trophy (Top 6 teams from the previous tournament)	6	Bahawalpur
2024–25 Quaid-e-Azam Trophy (Top 6 teams from the previous tournament)	6	Islamabad
2024–25 Quaid-e-Azam Trophy (Top 6 teams from the previous tournament)	6	Lahore Whites
2024–25 Quaid-e-Azam Trophy (Top 6 teams from the previous tournament)	6	Peshawar
2024–25 Quaid-e-Azam Trophy (Top 6 teams from the previous tournament)	6	Sialkot
Top 2 teams from the 2025 Hanif Mohammad Trophy, along with two more teams with the highest points across the two groups.	4	Faisalabad
Top 2 teams from the 2025 Hanif Mohammad Trophy, along with two more teams with the highest points across the two groups.	4	FATA
Top 2 teams from the 2025 Hanif Mohammad Trophy, along with two more teams with the highest points across the two groups.	4	Karachi Blues
Top 2 teams from the 2025 Hanif Mohammad Trophy, along with two more teams with the highest points across the two groups.	4	Multan

== Format ==
The tournament will follow a round-robin format, with each of the ten teams playing against one another. The top teams will advance to a final to determine the champion. Matches will be hosted across four venues in Pakistan, ensuring accessibility and high-quality facilities.

== Venues ==
The venues for the 46-match QeA Trophy are Abbottabad Cricket Stadium in Abbottabad, Shoaib Akhtar Stadium in Rawalpindi, Imran Khan Cricket Stadium in Peshawar and Diamond Club Ground and Marghzar Cricket Ground in Islamabad.

City	Abbottabad	Rawalpindi	Peshawar	Islamabad		Lahore
Stadium	Abbottabad Cricket Stadium	Shoaib Akhtar Stadium	Imran Khan Cricket Stadium	Diamond Club Ground	Marghzar Cricket Ground	Gaddafi Stadium
Capacity	4,000	8,000	35,000	—	15,000	34,000
Matches	9	9	9	9	9	Final
2025–26 Quaid-e-Azam Trophy is located in Pakistan

== Team standings ==
=== Points table ===
Pos	Team	Pld	W	L	D	Pts	Qualification
1	Karachi Blues	9	5	2	2	161	Advanced to the final
2	Sialkot	9	5	1	3	155	Advanced to the final
3	Faisalabad	9	4	2	3	136	
4	Peshawar	9	5	3	1	132	
5	Lahore Whites	9	3	3	3	121	
6	FATA	9	2	4	3	107	
7	Islamabad	9	2	3	4	105	
8	Multan	9	2	5	2	102	
9	Bahawalpur	9	2	3	4	100	
10	Abbottabad	9	1	5	3	68	

First match(es) will be played: complete. Source: ESPNcricinfo

=== Progression ===
Team	League Matches									Final
Team	1	2	3	4	5	6	7	8	9	Final
Abbottabad	10	17	43	45	47	55	60	67	68	
Bahawalpur	15	23	28	37	59	68	68	75	100	
Faisalabad	8	17	19	49	71	94	109	132	136	
FATA	10	17	41	45	55	67	94	101	107	
Islamabad	10	19	22	26	40	65	74	78	105	
Karachi Blues	13	38	42	53	60	86	110	138	161	Champions
Lahore Whites	12	23	29	39	63	70	76	99	121	
Multan	13	18	44	53	58	62	67	73	102	
Peshawar	8	29	53	80	84	87	109	132	132	
Sialkot	5	17	39	66	92	102	126	149	155	Runner-Up

Note: Win Loss Draw

== Round-robin ==
The Pakistan Cricket Board (PCB) released the full fixtures on 30 September 2025, with each team playing nine matches across nine rounds.

=== Round 1 ===
6–9 October 2025
Match 1
Scorecard

Bahawalpur	v	Abbottabad
399 (21.3 overs); Mohammad Ammar 105 (144); Israr Hussain 3/78 (22 overs)		166 (44.3 overs); Mohammad Suleman 41* (64); Muhammad Imran 5/26 (14 overs)
		155/3 (43 overs) (f/o); Fakhar Zaman 61* (79); Saad Khan 1/36 (15 overs)

Match drawn
Abbottabad Cricket Stadium, Abbottabad
Umpires: Zulfiqar Jan and Saqib Khan

- Abbottabad won the toss and elected to field.
- No play was possible on day 1 due to rain.
- Only 21.3 overs of play was possible on day 2 due to rain.
- Mohammad Adil (Abbottabad) and Muhammad Imran (Bahawalpur) both made their first-class debuts.
- Mohammad Ammar (Bahawalpur) scored his maiden century in first-class cricket.
- Muhammad Imran (Bahawalpur) took his maiden five-wicket haul in first-class cricket.
- Points: Bahawalpur 15, Abbottabad 10

6–9 October 2025
Match 2
Scorecard

Islamabad	v	Lahore Whites
256 (76.4 overs); Shamyl Hussain 86 (152); Naseem Shah 5/34 (16 overs)		301 (71.4 overs); Hussain Talat 106* (161); Nusratullah 3/71 (16 overs)
158/3 (42 overs); Abdul Faseeh 75 (88); Salman Ali Agha 2/72 (18 overs)

Match drawn
Shoaib Akhtar Stadium, Rawalpindi
Umpires: Farooq Ali Khan and Mohammad Sajid

- Lahore Whites won the toss and elected to field.
- No play was possible on day 1 due to rain.
- Only 28.2 overs of play was possible on day 2 due to rain.
- Points: Lahore Whites 12, Islamabad 10

6–9 October 2025
Match 3
Scorecard

Peshawar	v	Sialkot
376/5d (102.4 overs); Mohammad Rizwan 123* (203); Amad Butt 2/25 (12 overs)		156/3 (29 overs); Mohsin Riaz 67 (56); Abuzar 2/14 (5 overs)

Match drawn
Imran Khan Cricket Stadium, Peshawar
Umpires: Imranullah Aslam and Qaiser Khan

- Peshawar won the toss and elected to field.
- No play was possible on day 1 due to rain.
- Only 49 overs of play was possible on day 3 due to rain.
- Abuzar and Sufiyan Muqeem (Peshawar) both made their first-class debuts.
- Mohammad Haris (Peshawar) scored his maiden century in first-class cricket.
- Points: Peshawar 8, Sialkot 5

6–9 October 2025
Match 4
Scorecard

Federally Administered Tribal Areas	v	Multan
273 (92.4 overs); Mohammad Sarwar 80 (120); Aamer Yamin 5/48 (18.4 overs)		394 (102.5 overs); Bismillah Khan 138 (158); Zahid Mahmood 5/99 (29.5 overs)
39/1 (9 overs); Mohammad Naeem 25* (35); Ali Usman 1/7 (4 overs)

Match drawn
Diamond Club Ground, Islamabad
Umpires: Nasir Hussain and Abdul Muqeet

- Multan won the toss and elected to field.
- No play was possible on day 1 and day 2 due to rain.
- Only 36 overs of play was possible on day 2 due to rain.
- Points: Multan 13, Federally Administered Tribal Areas 10

6–9 October 2025
Match 5
Scorecard

Karachi Blues	v	Faisalabad
477 (115.3 overs); Danish Aziz 155 (231); Faham-ul-Haq 3/59 (15 overs)		354 (92.1 overs); Hasan Raza 172 (239); Mushtaq Ahmed 3/88 (19 overs)
173/6 (40 overs); Saim Ayub 79 (84); Ahmed Safi Abdullah 4/31 (11 overs)

Match drawn
Marghzar Cricket Ground, Islamabad
Umpires: Tariq Rasheed and Kashif Sohail

- Karachi Blues won the toss and elected to bat.
- No play was possible on day 1 due to rain.
- Haroon Arshad (Karachi Blues) and Mudassar Zunair (Faisalabad) both made their first-class debuts.
- Haroon Arshad (Karachi Blues) scored his madiden century in first-class cricket.
- Points: Karachi Blues 13, Faisalabad 8

=== Round 2 ===
12–15 October 2025
Match 6
Scorecard

Abbottabad	v	Lahore Whites
365 (109.2 overs); Khalid Usman 78 (128); Mohammad Rameez 6/144 (37.2 overs)		500 (126.1 overs); Ali Zaryab 199 (464); Khalid Usman 5/172 (47.1 overs)
377 (78.3 overs); Ahmed Khan 104; Mohammad Rameez 4/168 (30.3 overs)		1/0 (3 overs); Ali Zaryab 1* (9)

Match drawn
Diamond Club Ground, Islamabad
Umpires: Abdul Muqeet and Kashif Sohail

- Abbottabad won the toss and elected to field.
- Mohammad Rameez (Lahore Whites) took his maiden five-wicket haul in first-class cricket.
- Ahmed Khan (Abbottabad) scored his maiden century in first-class cricket.
- Points: Abbottabad 7, Lahore Region 11

12–15 October 2025
Match 7
Scorecard

Islamabad	v	Bahawalpur
541/6d (137.3 overs); Sarmad Bhatti 144 (214); Gulfam Aziz 2/88 (19 overs)		508 (139.4 overs); Saad Khan 215 (308); Muhammad Musa 3/68 (23 overs)
213/3 (60 overs); Shamyl Hussain 123* (175); Mubasir Khan 2/54 (26 overs)

Match drawn
Shoaib Akhtar Stadium, Rawalpindi
Umpires: Saleem Butt and Tariq Rasheed

- Bahawalpur won the toss and elected to field.
- Hammad Khan (Islamabad) scored his maiden century in first-class cricket.
- Saad Khan (Bahawalpur) scored his maiden double century in first-class cricket.
- Points: Islamabad 9, Bahawalpur 8

12–15 October 2025
Match 8
Scorecard

Peshawar	v	Federally Administered Tribal Areas
271 (63 overs); Israrullah 91 (171); Zahid Mahmood 2/13 (5 overs)		311 (68.2 overs); Mohammad Farooq 90 (65); Iftikhar Ahmed 3/19 (4 overs)
295 (84 overs); Iftikhar Ahmed 75 (117); Zahid Mahmood 6/85 (24 overs)		238 (68.5 overs); Salman Khan 73 (127); Mohammad Amir Khan 5/72 (19.5 overs)

Peshawar won by 17 runs
Abbottabad Cricket Stadium, Abbottabad

- Peshawar won the toss and elected to field.
- Najab Khan (Peshawar) made his first-class debut.
- Points: Peshawar 21, Federally Administered Tribal Areas 7

12–15 October 2025
Match 9
Scorecard

Faisalabad	v	Sialkot
255 (89.5 overs); Atiq-ur-Rehman 81 (118); Mohammad Ali 5/47 (19 overs)		416 (121.5 overs); Mehran Mumtaz 125 (156); Shahid Ali 3/115 (29 overs)
346/6 (15 overs); Atiq-ur-Rehman 143 (179); Usama Mir 3/82 (22 overs)

Match drawn
Imran Khan Cricket Stadium, Peshawar
Umpires: Khalid Mahmood and Mohammad Sajid

- Faisalabad won the toss and elected to bat.
- Jahandad Khan (Faisalabad) made his first-class debut.
- Mehran Mumtaz (Sialkot) and Atiq-ur-Rehman (Faisalabd) both scored their maiden century in first-class cricket.
- Points: Sialkot 12, Faisalabad 9

12–15 October 2025
Match 10
Scorecard

Multan	v	Karachi Blues
260 (70.5 overs); Arafat Minhas 77 (111); Danish Aziz 2/4 (2.5 overs)		433 (89.1 overs); Saad Baig 154 (196); Faisal Akram 5/113 (20 overs)
272 (65.4 overs); Sharoon Siraj 96 (148); Saqib Khan 6/62 (17.4 overs)		100/3 (16.3 overs); Saad Baig 65* (56); Arafat Minhas 2/11 (1.3 overs)

Karachi Blues won by 7 wickets
Marghzar Cricket Ground, Islamabad
Umpires: Irfan Haider and Nasir Hussain

- Karachi Blues won the toss and elected to field.
- Hasan Hafeez (Multan) made his first-class debut.
- Saad Baig (Karachi Blues) scored his maiden century in first-class cricket.
- Points: Karachi Blues 25, Multan 5

=== Round 3 ===
18–21 October 2025
Match 11
Scorecard

Abbottabad	v	Islamabad
437 (102 overs); Yasir Khan 185 (260); Mohammad Nadeem 3/83 (22 overs)		228 (54.2 overs); Shamyl Hussain 100 (92); Israr Hussain 4/71 (16 overs)
314/9d (55 overs); Fakhar Zaman 74 (70); Jawad Ali 3/126 (20 overs)		453 (114.1 overs); Raja Hamza Waheed 117 (118); Khalid Usman 5/115 (39.1 overs)

Abbottabad won by 70 runs
Marghzar Cricket Ground, Islamabad
Umpires: Qaiser Khan and Khalid Mahmood

- Islamabad won the toss and elected to field.
- Yasir Khan (Abbottabad) scored his maiden century in first-class cricket.
- POints: Abbottabad 26, Islamabad 3

18–21 October 2025
Match 12
Scorecard

Bahawalpur	v	Peshawar
131 (54 overs); Mubasir Khan 48* (88); Mohammad Amir Khan 3/40 (18 overs)		278 (56.1 overs); Waqar Ahmed 71 (96); Mohammad Imran 5/87 (21 overs)
261 (73 overs); Mubasir Khan 64 (93); Iftikhar Ahmed 5/52 (20 overs)		116/2 (16 overs); Muhammad Amir Barki 71* (51); Mohammad Azab 1/33 (3 overs)

Peshawar won by 8 wickets
Shoaib Akhtar Stadium, Rawalpindi
Umpires: Imranullah Aslam and Ghulam Sarwar

- Peshawar won the toss and elected to field.
- Muhammad Amir Barki (Peshawar) made his first-class debut.
- Points: Peshawar 24, Bahawalpur 5

18–21 October 2025
Match 13
Scorecard

Sialkot	v	Lahore Whites
222 (70.5 overs); Mohsin Riaz 76 (138); Haseeb-ur-Rehman 4/47 (9.5 overs)		235 (70 overs); Haseeb-ur-Rehman 40 (58); Mohammad Hasnain 4/42 (14 overs)
402/6d (88.3 overs); Mohsin Riaz 100* (99); Ubaid Shah 3/126 (20.3 overs)		105 (35.5 overs); Junaid Ali 23 (14); Mohammad Ali 5/41 (10.5 overs)

Sialkot won by 284 runs
Diamond Club Ground, Islamabad
Umpires: Aaley Haider and Mohammad Sajid

- Lahore Whites won the toss and elected to field.
- Points: Sialkot 22, Lahore Whites 6

18–21 October 2025
Match 14
Scorecard

Federally Administered Tribal Areas	v	Karachi Blues
312 (77.1 overs); Mohammad Farooq 75 (92); Mohammad Asghar 3/47 (10.1 overs)		207 (68.2 overs); Abdullah Fazal 67 (94); Shahid Aziz 5/45 (16.2 overs)
190 (62.4 overs); Mohammad Usman 56 (159); Mohammad Asghar 4/28 (13.4 overs)		111 (45.1 overs); Usman Rahim 23 (39); Shahid Aziz 5/33 (14.1 overs)

Federally Administered Tribal Areas won by 184 runs
Imran Khan Cricket Stadium, Peshawar
Umpires: Zulfiqar Jan and Kashif Sohail

- Federally Administered Tribal Areas won the toss and elected to bat.
- Usman Rahim (Karachi Blues) made his first-class debut.
- Mohammad Asghar (Karachi Blues) took his 200th wicket in first-class cricket.
- Points: Federally Administered Tribal Areas 24, Karachi Blues 4

18–21 October 2025
Match 15
Scorecard

Faisalabad	v	Multan
212 (61.2 overs); Ali Shan 95 (156); Aamer Yamin 6/37 (15 overs)		551/9d (126 overs); Arafat Minhas 152* (163); Shahid Ali 3/139 (30 overs)
372 (129.3 overs); Asim Ali 114 (249); Mohammad Shan 3/104 (27 overs)		38/0 (6.5 overs); Waqar Hussain 16* (23)

Multan won by 10 wickets
Abbottabad Cricket Stadium, Abbottabad
Umpires: Faisal Afridi and Farooq Ali Khan

- Multan won the toss and elected to field.
- Mohammad Jamshed and Mohammad Shan (Multan) and Ibtisam Rehman (Faisalabad) all made their first-class debuts.
- Aamer Yamin (Multan) took his 200th wicket in first-class cricket.
- Arafat Minhas (Multan) scored his maiden century in first-class cricket.
- Points: Multan 26, Faisalabad 2

=== Round 4 ===
24–27 October 2025
Match 16
Scorecard

Peshawar	v	Abbottabad
448/9d (106.5 overs); Israrullah 117 (210); Aqib Khan 3/86 (23 overs)		181 (69.4 overs); Zain Ishaq 60 (155); Iftikhar Ahmed 4/21 (13.4 overs)
194/1d (39.4 overs); Waqar Ahmed 100* (119); Shahnawaz Dahani 1/64 (12 overs)		214 (79.2 overs); Yasir Khan 97 (173); Mohammad Irfan 3/28 (17 overs)

Peshawar won by 247 runs
Imran Khan Cricket Stadium, Peshawar
Umpires: Imtiaz Iqbal and Nasir Hussain

- Abbottabad won the toss and elected to field.
- Mohammad Irfan and Khalid Shah (Peshawar) both made their first-class debuts.
- Points: Peshawar 27, Abbottabad 2

24–27 October 2025
Match 17
Scorecard

Sialkot	v	Islamabad
407 (100.4 overs); Azan Awais 134 (185); Hammad Khan 3/35 (14.4 overs)		186 (52 overs); Sarmad Bhatti 82 (120); Athar Mahmood 5/43 (12 overs)
246/7d (63 overs); Ayaz Tasawwar 84 (133); Kaleem Dil 4/67 (19 overs)		156 (43 overs); Rizwan Ali 45 (81); Mohammad Ali 4/29 (12 overs)

Shoaib Akhtar Stadium, Rawalpindi
Umpires: Zulfiqar Jan and Abdul Muqeet

- Islamabad won the toss and elected to field.
- Points: Sialkot 27, Islamabad 4

24–27 October 2025
Match 18
Scorecard

Bahawalpur	v	Multan
501 (140.1 overs); Saifullah Bangash 119* (210); Kashif Ali		462 (113 overs); Imran Butt 113 (207); Mohammad Azab 5/130 (29 overs)
239 (71.4 overs); Saifullah Bangash 74* (127); Ali Usman 5/88 (28 overs)		5/0 (1 over); Sharoon Siraj 5* (5)

Match drawn
Diamond Club Ground, Islamabad
Umpires: Aaley Haider and Khalid Mahmood

- Multan won the toss and elected to field.
- Saifullah Bangash (Bahawalpur) scored his 2,000th run in first-class cricket.
- Points: Bahawalpur 9, Multan 9

23–27 October 2025
Match 19
Scorecard

Karachi Blues	v	Lahore Whites
424 (110 overs); Rameez Aziz 102 (170); Haseeb-ur-Rehman 4/100 (25 overs)		456 (106.4 overs); Tayyab Tahir 108 (117); Mohammad Asghar 4/93 (20.4 overs)
360 (97.3 overs); Saad Baig 149 (186); Mohammad Abbas 6/78 (24 overs)

Match drawn
Abbottabad Cricket Stadium, Abbottabad
Umpires: Saqib Khan and Farooq Ali Khan

- Lahore Whites won the toss and elected to field.
- Mohammad Abbas (Lahore Whites) scored his 1,000th run in first-class cricket.
- Points: Karachi Blues 11, Lahore Whites 10

24–27 October 2025
Match 20
Scorecard

Federally Administered Tribal Areas	v	Faisalabad
191 (52.2 overs); Rehan Afridi 56 (66); Jahandad Khan 3/26 (13 overs)		462 (98.5 overs); Hasan Raza 174 (247); Akif Javed 4/70 (16.5 overs)
58 (20.4 overs); Mohammad Wasim Khan 18 (31); Asad Raza 4/16 (8 overs)

Faisalabad won by an innings and 213 runs
Marghzar Cricket Ground, Islamabad
Umpires: Imran Javed and Ghulam Sarwar

- Federally Administered Tribal Areas won the toss and elected to field.
- Points: Faisalabad 30, Federally Administered Tribal Areas 4

=== Round 5 ===
30 October–2 November 2025
Match 21
Scorecard

Peshawar	v	Faisalabad
320 (84.1 overs); Iftikhar Ahmed 131 (204); Khurram Shahzad 3/90 (20 overs)		384 (121.4 overs); Faham-ul-Haq 157 (326); Sajid Khan 3/84 (35.4 overs)
227 (70.1 overs); Iftikhar Ahmed 61 (136); Afaq Afridi 5/55 (22 overs)		167/3 (41 overs); Atiq-ur-Rehman 65 (56); Maaz Sadaqat 2/25 (7 overs)

Faisalabad won by 7 wickets
Shoaib Akhtar Stadium, Rawalpindi
Umpires: Aaley Haider and Imtiaz Iqbal

- Faisalabad won the toss and elected to field.
- Najab Khan (Peshawar) made his first-class debut.
- Ahmed Safi Abdullah (Faisalabad) scored his 1,000th run in first-class cricket.
- Points: Peshawar 4, Faisalabad 22

30 October–2 November 2025
Match 22
Scorecard

Islamabad	v	Federally Administered Tribal Areas
432 (103 overs); Sarmad Bhatti 153* (253); Akif Javed 4/121 (23 overs)		281 (55.3 overs); Rehan Afridi 91 (98); Hunain Shah 4/104 (16 overs)
160/1 (34 overs); Raja Hamza Waheed 76* (105); Asif Afridi 1/53 (12 overs)		378 (98.3 overs) (f/o); Khushdil Shah 159 (150); Muhammad Musa 3/74 (19 overs)

Match drawn
Abbottabad Cricket Stadium, Abbottabad
Umpires: Farooq Ali Khan and Saqib Khan

- Islamabad won the toss and elected to field.
- Mohammad Touqeer (FATA) made his first-class debut.
- Rohail Nazir (Islamabad) and Khushdil Shah (FATA) both scored their 2,000th run in first-class cricket.
- Rehan Afridi (Federally Administered Tribal Areas) scored his 4,000th run in first-class cricket.
- Points: Islamabad 11, Federally Administered Tribal Areas 10

30 October–2 November 2025
Match 23
Scorecard

Sialkot	v	Abbottabad
385 (107.1 overs); Azan Awais 123 (194); Shahnawaz Dahani 5/86 (27 overs)		92 (34.5 overs); Shahzaib Khan 39 (100); Mohammad Hasnain 5/22 (8 overs)
51/1 (9.3 overs); Mohammad Huraira 29* (36); Shahnawaz Dahani 1/17 (4.3 overs)		342 (95 overs) (f/o); Shahzaib Khan 131 (257); Hasan Ali 3/64 (26 overs)

Sialkot won by 9 wickets
Diamond Club Ground, Islamabad
Umpires: Imranullah Aslam and Imran Javed

- Abbottabad won the toss and elected to field.
- Mohammad Ali (Sialkot) took his 200th wicket in first-class cricket.
- Shahzaib Khan (Abbottabad) scored his maiden century in first-class cricket.
- Points: Sialkot 26, Abbottabad 2

30 October–2 November 2025
Match 24
Scorecard

Karachi Blues	v	Bahawalpur
217 (56.3 overs); Saad Baig 73 (127); Mohammad Azab 5/70 (15 overs)		115 (33 overs); Saad Khan 61 (90); Saqib Khan 4/42 (14 overs)
110 (37.5 overs); Omair Yousuf 76 (113); Gulfam Aziz 3/27 (11 overs)		215/2 (64.1 overs); Saad Khan 103* (137); Mushtaq Ahmed 2/64 (14 overs)

Bahawalpur won by 8 wickets
Imran Khan Cricket Stadium, Peshawar
Umpires: Qaiser Khan and Mohammad Sajid

- Bahawalpur won the toss and elected to field.
- Zaman Khan (Bahawalpur) made his first-class debut.
- Mushtaq Ahmed (Karachi Blues) took his 100th wicket in first-class cricket.
- Points: Bahawalpur 22, Karachi Blues 7

30 October–2 November 2025
Match 25
Scorecard

Multan	v	Lahore Whites
164 (43.4 overs); Arafat Minhas 45 (51); Mohammad Abbas 5/32 (15.4 overs)		283 (74 overs); Qasim Akram 61 (69); Muhammad Ismail 3/85 (19 overs)
199 (64.3 overs); Imran Butt 71 (151); Mohammad Abbas 5/51 (26 overs)		84/4 (17.3 overs); Nisar Ahmad 24* (11); Kashif Ali 2/33 (8 overs)

Lahore Whites won by 6 wickets
Marghzar Cricket Ground, Islamabad
Umpires: Khalid Mahmood and Ghulam Sarwar

- Lahore Whites won the toss and elected to field.
- Abubakar (Lahore Whites) made his first-class debut.
- Saad Nasim (Lahore Whites) scored his 7,000th run in first-class cricket.
- Aamer Jamal (Lahore Whites) took his 100th wicket in first-class cricket.
- Points: Lahore Whites 24, Multan 5

=== Round 6 ===
5–8 November 2025
Match 26
Scorecard

Federally Administered Tribal Areas	v	Abbottabad
687/7d (142.3 overs); Khushdil Shah 206 (257); Kamran Ghulam 3/43 (10 overs)		442 (135 overs); Shahzaib Khan 167 (350); Asif Afridi
		165/2 (70.3 overs) (f/o); Shahzaib Khan 100* (191); Haroon Sadaqat 1/39 (13.3 overs)

Match drawn
Shoaib Akhtar Stadium, Rawalpindi
Umpires: Zulfiqar Jan and Tariq Rasheed

- Abbottabad won the toss and elected to field.
- Umair Badshah (Abbottabad) made his first-class debut.
- Mohammad Farooq (Federally Administered Tribal Areas) scored his maiden century in first-class cricket.
- Khushdil Shah (Federally Administered Tribal Areas) scored his maiden double century in first-class cricket.
- Salman Khan (Federally Administered Tribal Areas) scored his 1,000th run in first-class cricket.
- Points: Federally Administered Tribal Areas 12, Abbottabad 8

5–8 November 2025
Match 27
Scorecard

Bahawalpur	v	Sialkot
511/9d (122.4 overs); Mohammad Ammar 166 (310); Hasan Ali 3/77 (26 overs)		614/9 (156 overs); Muhammad Hurraira 178 (216); Saad Khan 5/85 (24 overs)

Match drawn
Abbottabad Cricket Stadium, Abbottabad
Umpires: Farooq Ali Khan and Saqib Khan

- Sialkot won the toss and elected to field.
- Mohammad Akram (Bahawalpur) made his first-class cricket.
- Mohammad Sudais (Bahawalpur) scored his maiden century in first-class cricket.
- Muhammad Hurraira and Azan Awais (Sialkot) both scored their 4,000th and 2,000th run in first-class cricket.
- Points: Sialkot 10, Bahawalpur 9

5–8 November 2025
Match 28
Scorecard

Lahore Whites	v	Faisalabad
179 (48.2 overs); Obaid Shahid 43 (72); Afaq Afridi 5/63 (16 overs)		115 (39.5 overs); Awais Zafar 26 (40); Aamer Jamal 4/31 (12 overs)
81 (20.5 overs); Saad Nasim 33 (31); Khurram Shahzad		146/6 (26.1 overs); Faham-ul-Haq 42 (49); Aamer Jamal 2/33 (8 overs)

Faisalabad won by 4 wickets
Diamond Club Ground, Islamabad
Umpires: Aaley Haider and Imran Javed

- Faisalabad won the toss and elected to field.
- Points: Faisalabad 23, Lahore Whites 7

5–8 November 2025
Match 29
Scorecard

Islamabad	v	Multan
333 (89.4 overs); Rohail Nazir 71 (122); Muhammad Ismail 4/78 (22 overs)		170 (44.3 overs); Imam-ul-Haq 51 (52); Naqeebullah 3/43 (14 overs)
172 (57.5 overs); Ali Usman 46 (71); Shayan Sheikh 4/56 (14.5 overs)		10/0 (0.5 overs); Raja Hamza Waheed 9* (4)

Islamabad won by 10 wickets
Imran Khan Cricket Stadium, Peshawar
Umpires: Imtiaz Iqbal and Ghulam Sarwar

- Multan won the toss and elected to field.

5–8 November 2025
Match 30
Scorecard

Karachi Blues	v	Peshawar
391 (107 overs); Saad Baig 109 (210); Mohammad Amir Khan 4/87 (24 overs)		165 (50.3 overs); Israrullah 62 (126); Mohammad Umar 6/30 (12.3 overs)
283/3 (61 overs); Saad Baig 116 (153); Sajid Khan 2/78 (17 overs)		291 (81.4 overs); Iftikhar Ahmed 108 (173); Mohammad Hamza 5/63 (17 overs)

Karachi Blues won by 218 runs
Marghzar Cricket Ground, Islamabad
Umpires: Qaiser Khan and Khalid Mahmood

- Peshawar won the toss and elected to field.
- Saad Baig (Karachi Blues) scored his 1,000th run in first-class cricket.
- Mohammad Umar (Peshawar) took his maiden five-wicket haul in first-class cricket.
- Points: Karachi Blues 26, Peshawar 3

=== Round 7 ===
11–14 November 2025
Match 31
Scorecard

Faisalabad	v	Islamabad
386 (95.4 overs); Awais Zafar 148 (158); Hunain Shah 5/84 (18.4 overs)		159 (52.1 overs); Sarmad Bhatti 57 (123); Khurram Shahzad 5/53 (16 overs)
221/2d (33.33 overs); Hasan Raza 106* (103); Jawad Ali 1/45 (8 overs)		429/8 (114 overs); Shamyl Hussain 131 (158); Afaq Afridi 3/96 (26 overs)

Match drawn
Abbottabad Cricket Stadium, Abbottabad
Umpires: Aaley Haider and Kashif Sohail

- Faisalabad won the toss and elected to bat.
- Hunain Shah (Islamabad) took his maiden five-wicket haul in first-class cricket.
- Points: Faisalabad 15, Islamabad 9

11–14 November 2025
Match 32
Scorecard

Karachi Blues	v	Abbottabad
258 (80 overs); Danish Aziz 89* (152); Khalid Usman 3/83 (32 overs)		191 (59.1 overs); Khayam Khan 59 (105); Saqib Khan 7/34 (15.1 overs)
451/5d (82 overs); Shan Masood 250* (234); Mehrooz Rasheed 2/144 (21 overs)		325 (92.5 overs); Ahmed Khan 88 (174); Kashif Bhatti 6/98 (39)

Karachi Blues won by 193 runs
Shoaib Akhtar Stadium, Rawalpindi
Umpires: Imranullah Aslam and Tariq Rasheed

- Karachi Blues won the toss and elected to bat.
- Points: Karachi Blues 24, Abbottabad 5

11–14 November 2025
Match 33
Scorecard

Sialkot	v	Multan
288 (76.3 overs); Azan Awais 81 (170); Ali Usman 5/98 (34 overs)		139 (33.4 overs); Imran Butt 31 (35); Usama Mir 5/28 (7.4 overs)
241 (42 overs); Hasan Ali 91 (64); Ali Usman 5/98 (21 overs)		186 (54 overs); Zain Abbas 43 (76); Hamza Nazar 5/64 (19 overs)

Sialkot won by 204 runs
Marghzar Cricket Ground, Islamabad
Umpires: Khalid Mahmood and Mohammad Sajid

- Sialkot won the toss and elected to bat.
- Ghulam Haider (Multan) made his first-class debut.
- Hamza Nazar (Sailkot) took his maiden five-wicket haul in first-class cricket.
- Points: Sialkot 24, Multan 5

11–14 November 2025
Match 34
Scorecard

Federally Administered Tribal Areas	v	Bahawalpur
396 (127.5 overs); Salman Khan 114 (209); Gulfam Aziz 2/43 (21 overs)		146 (55.1 overs); Mohammad Akram 40 (72); Hayatullah 6/71 (19 overs)
		164 (41.1 overs) (f/o); Mohammad Umair 32 (52); Sirajuddin 3/21 (8 overs)

Federally Administered Tribal Areas won by an innings and 86 runs
Imran Khan Cricket Stadium, Peshawar
Umpires: Imran Javed and Abdul Muqeet

- Federally Administered Tribal Areas won the toss and elected to bat.
- Hayatullah (Federally Administered Tribal Areas) took his maiden five-wicket haul in first-class cricket.
- Points: Federally Administered Tribal Areas 27, Bahawalpur 0

11–14 November 2025
Match 35
Scorecard

Peshawar	v	Lahore Whites
245 (76.1 overs); Israrullah 83 (120); Noman Ali 4/78 (29 overs)		230 (73 overs); Qasim Akram 82 (126); Sajid Khan 5/82 (30 overs)
237 (74 overs); Israrullah 76 (125); Noman Ali 5/112 (33 overs)		167 (41.2 overs); Khawaja Abdullah 52 (92); Sajid Khan 5/60 (16.2 overs)

Peshawar won by 85 runs
Diamond Club Ground, Islamabad
Umpires: Imtiaz Iqbal and Ghulam Sarwar

- Peshawar won the toss and elected to bat.
- Khawaja Abdullah (Lahore Whites) and Razaullah (Peshawar) both made their first-class debut.
- Points: Peshawar 22, Lahore Whites 6

=== Round 8 ===
17–20 November 2025
Match 36
Scorecard

Faisalabad	v	Abbottabad
121 (31.3 overs); Jahandad Khan 31 (12); Khalid Usman 7/42 (14.3 overs)		123 (39.3 overs); Shahzaib Khan 53 (117); Ali Asfand 5/31 (9.3 overs)
279 (84 overs); Awais Zafar 83 (116); Khalid Usman 5/92 (32 overs)		99 (41 overs); Shahzaib Khan 39 (111); Hasan Raza 4/40 (19 overs)

Faisalabad won by 178 runs
Marghzar Cricket Ground, Islamabad
Umpires: Nasir Hussain and Qaiser Khan

- Faisalabad won the toss and elected to bat.
- Ali Asfand (Faisalabad) took his maiden five-wicket haul in first-class cricket.
- Points: Faisalabad 23, Abbottabad 7

17–20 November 2025
Match 37
Scorecard

Bahawalpur	v	Lahore Whites
140 (49.1 overs); Saad Khan 37 (68); Noman Ali 4/51 (17.1 overs)		181 (43.2 overs); Hussain Talat 58 (79); Mohammad Junaid 3/25 (4 overs)
176 (48.1 overs); Mohammad Imran 44 (49); Mohammad Abbas 3/8 (12 overs)		136/5 (43.3 overs); Hussain Talat 49 (90); Mohammad Umair 4/46 (19 overs)

Lahore White won by 5 wickets
Shoaib Akhtar Stadium, Rawalpindi
Umpires: Mohammad Sajid and Ghulam Sarwar

- Bahawalpur won the toss and elected to bat.
- Burhan Basharat, Salman Hasan, Mohammad Younis (Bahawalpur) and Mohib Bhatti (Lahore Whites) all made their first-class debuts.
- Points: Lahore Whites 23, Bahawalpur 7

17–20 November 2025
Match 38
Scorecard

Islamabad	v	Karachi Blues
161 (37.2 overs); Shamyl Hussain 85 (90); Kashif Bhatti 5/61 (17.2 overs)		368 (71.5 overs); Saud Shakeel 130 (164); Hasan Nawaz 3/58 (14 overs)
103 (26.3 overs); Hasan Nawaz 35 (66); Kashif Bhatti 3/15 (7 overs)

Karachi Blues won by an innings and 104 runs
Diamond Club Ground, Islamabad
Umpires: Mohammad Aslam and Abdul Muqeet

- Islamabad won the toss and elected to bat.
- Mohammad Qaiser (Islamabad) made his first-class cricket.
- Points: Karachi Blues 28, Islamabad 4

17–20 November 2025
Match 39
Scorecard

Peshawar	v	Multan
239 (57.4 overs); Abbas Ali 116 (136); Ali Usman 5/79 (22.4 overs)		125 (44 overs); Bismillah Khan 40 (53); Sajid Khan 4/29 (13 overs)
167 (38.3 overs); Waqar Ahmed 45 (60); Ali Usman 5/42 (10 overs)		92 (39.4 overs); Imran Butt 39 (111); Sajid Khan 6/39 (15.4 overs)

Peshawar won by 189 runs
Imran Khan Cricket Stadium, Peshawar
Umpires: Imtiaz Iqbal and Imran Javed

- Peshawar won the toss and elected to bat.
- Abbas Ali (Peshawar) scored his maiden century in first-class cricket.
- Points: Peshawar 23, Multan 6

17–20 November 2025
Match 40
Scorecard

Federally Administered Tribal Areas	v	Sialkot
110 (33.5 overs); Khushdil Shah 37 (67); Usama Mir 4/11 (3.5 overs)		186 (50.4 overs); Mohsin Riaz 33 (62)
226 (60.4 overs); Salman Khan 52 (91); Usama Mir 5/56 (17.4 overs)		151/3 (28.4 overs); Abdullah Shafique 95* (85); Asif Afridi 2/39 (14 overs)

Sialkot won by 7 wickets
Abbottabad Cricket Stadium, Abbottabad
Umpires: Saqib Khan and Farooq Ali Khan

- Federally Administered Tribal Areas won the toss and elected to bat.
- Khubaib Khalil (Federally Administered Tribal Areas) made his first-class debut.
- Points: Sialkot 23, Federally Administered Tribal Areas 7

=== Round 9 ===
23–26 November 2025
Match 41
Scorecard

Multan	v	Abbottabad
542/8d (119 overs); Imam-ul-Haq 181 (232); Mansoor Ali 4/133 (25 overs)		159 (40.1 overs); Mohammad Arif 61 (91); Ali Usman 6/65 (20 overs)
		182 (52.4 overs) (f/o); Shahzaib Khan 61 (147); Ali Usman (22.4 overs)

Multan won by an innings and 201 runs
Abbottabad Cricket Stadium, Abbottabad
Umpires: Qaiser Khan and Qaiser Waheed

- Multan won the toss and elected to bat.
- Points: Multan 29, Abbottabad 1

23–26 November 2025
Match 42
Scorecard

Faisalabad	v	Bahawalpur
312 (85.2 overs); Awais Zafar 148 (177); Mohammad Imran 4/57 (18.2 overs)		188 (82.3 overs); Mohammad Ammar 66 (214); Ahmed Safi Abdullah 5/36 (31 overs)
185 (53.2 overs); Hasan Raza 48 (62); Mohammad Junaid 7/58 (21 overs)		311/6 (85.1 Overs); Mohammad Sheharyar 92 (141); Khurram Shahzad 1/31 (16.1 overs)

Bahawalpur won by 4 wickets
Marghzar Cricket Ground, Islamabad
Umpires: Nasir Hussain and Imran Javed

- Faisalabad won the toss and elected to bat.
- Mohammad Junaid (Bahawalpur) took his maiden five-wicket haul in first-class cricket.
- Points: Bahawalpur 25, Faisalabad 4

23–26 November 2025
Match 43
Scorecard

Lahore Whites	v	Federally Administered Tribal Areas
205 (53.4 overs); Qasim Akram 54 (67); Hayatullah 7/78 (20.4 overs)		239 (63.5 overs); Salman Khan 104 (149); Noman Ali 5/52 (23 overs)
208 (54 overs); Ali Zaryab 54 (90); Asif Afridi 5/67 (20 overs)		141 (50.1 overs); Rehan Afridi 45 (101); Mohammad Abbas 5/31 (12 overs)

Lahore Whites won by 33 runs
Imran Khan Cricket Stadium, Peshawar
Umpires: Farooq Ali Khan and Mohammad Sajid

- Lahore Whites won the toss and elected to bat.
- Adnan Khan (Federally Administered Tribal Areas) made his first-class debut.
- Points: Lahore Whites 22, Federally Administered Tribal Areas 6

23–26 November 2025
Match 44
Scorecard

Islamabad	v	Peshawar
563 (148.3 Overs); Rohail Nazir 207 (269); Sajid Khan 3/112 (39.2 Overs)		231 (57.4 Overs); Sajid Khan 64 (76); Muhammad Musa 5/79 (18 Over)
		255 (52.2 Overs) (f/o); Razaullah 100 (95); Muhammad Musa 5/70 (11 Over)

Islamabad won by an innings and 77 runs
Diamond Club Ground, Islamabad
Umpires: Imtiaz Iqbal and Kashif Sohail

- Peshawar won the toss and elected to field first
- Razaullah (Peshawar) scored his maiden century in first-class cricket.
- Points: Islamabad 27, Peshawar 0

23–26 November 2025
Match 45
Scorecard

Sialkot	v	Karachi Blues
176 (46.2 Overs); Mehran Mumtaz 70 (61); Mohammad Umar 5/40 (13.2 Overs)		225 (57.5 Overs); Shan Masood 70 (123); Hamza Nazar 5/49 (14 Overs)
260 (83 Overs); Hamza Nazar 66 (81); Kashif Bhatti 5/72 (34 Overs)		212/7 (47.2 Overs); Shan Masood 86 (112); Mehran Mumtaz 4/40 (8.2 Overs)

Karachi Blues won by 3 wickets
Shoaib Akhtar Stadium, Rawalpindi
Umpires: Imranullah Aslam and Abdul Muqeet

- Sialkot won the toss and elected to bat.
- Points: Karachi Blues 23, Sialkot 6

== Final ==
1–5 December 2025
Final
Scorecard

Karachi Blues	v	Sialkot
340 (81.2 Overs); Abdullah Fazal 88 (149); Mohammad Ali 4/79 (24.2 Overs)		266 (71.5 Overs); Mohsin Riaz 71 (85); Saqib Khan 4/79 (23.5 Overs)
458 (133.4 Overs); Haroon Arshad 116 (236); Usama Mir 5/98 (28.4 Overs)		314 (71.1 Overs); Afzal Manzoor 63 (48); Saqib Khan 5/86 (20.1 Overs)

Karachi Blues won by 218 runs
Gaddafi Stadium, Lahore
Umpires: Tariq Rasheed and Zulfiqar Jan
Player of the match: Abdullah Fazal

- Sialkot won the toss and elected to field first.

== Statistics ==
=== Most Runs ===
Runs	Batter	Team	Mat	Inns	NO	Average	HS	100s	50s
1000	Saad Baig	Karachi Blues	10	19	1	55.55	154	4	3
899	Shamyl Hussain	Islamabad	9	16	2	64.21	131	3	5
838	Shahzaib Khan	Abbottabad	9	18	1	49.29	167	3	3
837	Saad Khan	Bahawalpur	9	15	1	59.78	215	3	3
803	Azan Awais	Sialkot	10	17	1	50.18	164	3	3
Source: ESPNcricinfo | Last updated: 5 December 2025

=== Most Wickets ===
Wtks	Bowler	Team	Mat	Inns	Avg	Econ	SR	BBI	5WI	10WM
48	Ali Usman	Multan	8	14	21.10	3.04	41.56	6/65	6	3
47	Saqib Khan	Karachi Blues	9	17	20.59	3.57	35.94	7/34	3	0
38	Mohammad Abbas	Lahore Whites	7	14	15.39	2.56	35.94	6/78	4	1
32	Mohammad Ali	Sialkot	9	16	26.59	3.29	48.40	5/24	2	0
31	Khalid Usman	Abbottabad	9	14	40.67	3.41	71.38	7/42	4	1
Source: ESPNcricinfo | Last updated: 5 December 2025

== Broadcasters ==
Country	Years	Channels
Pakistan	2025–26	Pakistan Cricket Board's channel on YouTube
Pakistan	2025–26	tapmad
