= 2023–24 Pakistan Cup =

Cricket tournament

- Dates: 1 November 2023 – 19 November 2023
- Administrator: Pakistan Cricket Board
- Cricket format: List A
- Tournament format(s): Double round-robin and knockout
- Host: Pakistan
- Champions: Peshawar (1st title)
- Participants: 8
- Matches: 31
- Player of the series: Haseebullah Khan
- Most runs: Saim Ayub (397)
- Most wickets: Abbas Afridi (15); Zahid Mahmood (15)

The 2023–24 Pakistan Cup is a List A cricket competition that took place in Pakistan from 1 November 2023 to 19 November 2023.

== Venues ==
Mirpur	Abbottabad	Rawalpindi	Rawalpindi
Mirpur Cricket Stadium	Abbottabad Cricket Stadium	Rawalpindi Cricket Stadium	Shoaib Akhtar Stadium
Capacity: 16,000	Capacity: 4,000	Capacity: 17,000	Capacity: 8,000
Matches: 7	Matches: 7	Matches: 10	Matches: 7
2023–24 Pakistan Cup is located in Pakistan

== Teams ==
Location of Teams in Pakistan

== Group stage ==
=== Points table ===
Team	Pld	W	L	D	T	NR	Pts	NRR
Peshawar	7	5	1	0	0	1	11	0.135
Karachi Whites	7	4	2	0	0	1	9	1.080
Multan	7	4	2	0	0	1	9	0.147
FATA	7	4	3	0	0	0	8	0.538
Rawalpindi	7	4	3	0	0	0	8	0.083
Faisalabad	7	2	5	0	0	0	4	-0.298
Lahore Blues	7	2	5	0	0	0	4	-0.404
Lahore Whites	7	1	5	0	0	1	3	-1.204

Advanced to the Semi-finals

=== Fixtures ===
==== Round 1 ====
1 November 2023
09:30
Scorecard

Lahore Whites; 199/8 (45 overs)	v	Lahore Blues; 132 (27 overs)
Tayyab Tahir 42 (72); Salman Irshad 2/33 (9 overs)		Hashim Ibrahim 36 (39); Ahmed Daniyal 5/33 (7 overs)

Lahore Whites won by 67 runs
Rawalpindi Cricket Stadium, Rawalpindi
Umpires: Aleem Dar and Rashid Riaz

- Lahore Blues won the toss and elected to field.
- Ahmed Daniyal, Hashim Ibrahim (Lahore Blues) and Hasan Rizwan, Mohammad Faiq, Umair Daniyal (Lahore Whites) all made their List A debuts.
- Points: Lahore Whites 2, Lahore Blues 0

1 November 2023
09:30
Scorecard

Karachi Whites; 205 (43.4 overs)	v	Peshawar; 207/3 (44.3 overs)
Danish Aziz 53 (81); Mohammad Ilyas 4/53 (9 overs)		Adil Amin 57* (74); Danish Aziz 3/42 (9 overs)

Peshawar won by 7 wickets
Mirpur Cricket Stadium, Mirpur
Umpires: Majid Hussain and Nasir Hussain

- Peshawar won the toss and elected to field.
- Aftab Ibrahim, Ashir Qureshi (Karachi Whites) and Najeebullah, Saqib Jamil, Zain Khan (Peshawar) all made their List A debuts.
- Points: Peshawar 2, Karachi Whites 0

1 November 2023
09:30
Scorecard

Faisalabad; 214/8 (42 overs)	v	Multan; 219/6 (39.2 overs)
Faheem Ashraf 60* 78; Sirajuddin 3/39 (8 overs)		Sharjeel Khan 100 (69); Khurram Shahzad 3/53 (9 overs)

Multan won by 4 wickets
Shoaib Akhtar Stadium, Rawalpindi
Umpires: Shozab Raza and Zulfiqar Jan

- Multan won the toss and elected to field.
- Arfan Liaqat, Sirajuddin (Multan) and Mohammad Saleem, Arham Nawab (Faisalabad) all made their List A debuts.
- Points: Multan 2, Faisalabad 0

1 November 2023
09:30
Scorecard

Rawalpindi; 170 (42.4 overs)	v	FATA; 154 (41.2 overs)
Taimur Khan 27 (41); Sameen Gul 2/17 (6 overs)		Mohammad Farooq 47 (72); Kashif Ali 3/33 (7.2 overs)

Rawalpindi won by 16 runs
Abbottabad Cricket Stadium, Abbottabad
Umpires: Aaley Haider and Aslam Bareach

- FATA won the toss and elected to field.
- Abdul Aziz, Azaz Khan, Mohammad Farooq, Muhammad Usman (FATA) and Jahandad Khan, Kashif Ali (Rawalpindi) all made their List A debuts.
- Points: Rawalpindi 2, Federally Administered Tribal Areas 0

==== Round 2 ====
3 November 2023
09:30
Scorecard

Lahore Whites; 266 (44.1 overs)	v	Multan; 270/4 (39.2 overs)
Aamer Jamal 74 (53); Mohammad Imran 4/39 (7.1 overs)		Haseebullah Khan 70 (96); Kamran Afzal 2/49 (6.2 overs)

Multan won by 6 wickets
Abbottabad Cricket Stadium, Abbottabad
Umpires: Aaley Haider and Aslam Bareach

- Multan won the toss and elected to field.
- Fahad Munir (Lahore Whites) made his List A debut.
- Points: Multan 2, Lahore Whites 0

3 November 2023
09:30
Scorecard

Peshawar; 212/9 (45 overs)	v	Rawalpindi; 211 (41.3 overs)
Nabi Gul 47 (48); Jahandad Khan 3/43 (9 overs)		Zeeshan Malik 83 (110); Kamran Ghulam 4/27 (7 overs)

Peshawar won by 1 run
Mirpur Cricket Stadium, Mirpur
Umpires: Majid Hussain and Mohammad Sajid

- Rawalpindi won the toss and elected to field.
- Points: Peshawar 2, Rawalpindi 0

3 November 2023
09:30
Scorecard

Faisalabad; 149 (36.2 overs)	v	Lahore Blues; 241/6 (45 overs)
Faheem Ashraf 40 (57); Hunain Shah 6/26 (7.2 overs)		Junaid Ali 47* (48); Faheem Ashraf 3/57 (9 overs)

Lahore Blues won by 92 runs
Rawalpindi Cricket Stadium, Rawalpindi
Umpires: Aleem Dar and Zulfiqar Jan

- Faisalabad won the toss and elected to field.
- Ibtasam-ul-Haq (Lahore Blues) made his List A debut.
- Points: Lahore Blues 2, Faisalabad 0

3 November 2023
09:30
Scorecard

FATA; 155 (36.2 overs)	v	Karachi Whites; 159/4 (31.1 overs)
Mohammad Sarwar 53 (68); Sohail Khan 3/18 (7.2 overs)		Omair Yousuf 41 (57); Irfanullah Shah 2/20 (5 overs)

Karachi Whites won by 6 wickets
Shoaib Akhtar Stadium, Rawalpindi
Umpires: Qaiser Khan and Shozab Raza

- Karachi Whites won the toss and elected to field.
- Points: Karachi Whites 2, FATA 0

==== Round 3 ====
5 November 2023
09:30
Scorecard

Lahore Whites; 201/9 (45 overs)	v	Rawalpindi; 203/6 (35.1 overs)
Saad Nasim 78* (83); Kashif Ali 3/25 (9 overs)		Bilawal Bhatti 69* (51); Aamer Jamal 2/51 (7 overs)

Rawalpindi won by 4 wickets
Rawalpindi Cricket Stadium, Rawalpindi
Umpires: Kashif Sohail and Mohammad Sajid

- Rawalpindi won the toss and elected to field.
- Points: Rawalpindi 2, Lahore Whites 0

5 November 2023
09:30
Scorecard

Multan; 257/3 (45 overs)	v	Peshawar; 258/6 (43.5 overs)
Haseebullah Khan 116* (123); Abbas Afridi 2/42 (9 overs)		Adil Amin 74* (64); Zahid Mahmood 4/44 (9 overs)

Peshawar won by 4 wickets
Mirpur Cricket Stadium, Mirpur
Umpires: Majid Hussain and Nasir Hussain

- Peshawar won the toss and elected to field.
- Waseem Akram (Multan) made his List A debut.
- Points: Peshawar 2, Multan 0

5 November 2023
09:30
Scorecard

Faisalabad; 258/3 (40 overs)	v	Karachi Whites; 254/8 (45 overs)
Mohammad Saleem 90* (102); Danish Aziz 2/37 (9 overs)		Danish Aziz 49 (63); Faheem Ashraf 3/64 (9 overs)

Faisalabad won by 7 wickets
Abbottabad Cricket Stadium, Abbottabad
Umpires: Aaley Haider and Saqib Khan

- Faisalabad won the toss and elected to field.
- Atiq-ur-Rehman (Faisalabad) made his List A debut.
- Points: Faisalabad 2, Karachi Whites 0

5 November 2023
09:30
Scorecard

FATA; 277/8 (45 overs)	v	Lahore Blues; 281/3 (41.5 overs)
Samiullah 62 (64); Qasim Akram 2/42 (7 overs)		Imran Butt 128 (113); Khushdil Shah 1/45 (8 overs)

Lahore Blues won by 7 wickets
Shoaib Akhtar Stadium, Rawalpindi
Umpires: Imranullah Aslam and Mohammad Asif

- Lahore Blues won the toss and elected to field.
- Mohammad Nisar and Samiullah (FATA) both made their List A debuts.
- Points: Lahore Blues 2, FATA 0

==== Round 4 ====
7 November 2023
09:30
Scorecard

Lahore Whites; 249/5 (45 overs)	v	Karachi Whites; 250/2 (34.4 overs)
Tayyab Tahir 92* (93); Noman Ali 2/36 (9 overs)		Shan Masood 121* (99); Ahmed Bashir 2/45 (7 overs)

Karachi Whites won by 8 wickets
Rawalpindi Cricket Stadium, Rawalpindi
Umpires: Waleed Yaqub and Kashif Sohail

- Karachi Whites won the toss and elected to field.
- Points: Karachi Whites 2, Lahore Whites 0

7 November 2023
09:30
Scorecard

Lahore Blues; 173 (42 overs)	v	Peshawar; 174/4 (35.3 overs)
Imran Butt 94 (129); Azam Khan 4/41 (9 overs)		Kamran Ghulam 54 (49); Ali Shafiq 2/46 (6 overs)

Peshawar won by 6 wickets
Shoaib Akhtar Stadium, Rawalpindi
Umpires: Mohammad Asif and Ghulam Sarwar

- Peshawar won the toss and elected to field.
- Azam Khan (Peshawar) made his List A debut.
- Points: Peshawar 2, Lahore Blues 0

7 November 2023
09:30
Scorecard

Faisalabad; 197 (39.5 overs)	v	Rawalpindi; 198/3 (38.5 overs)
Mohammad Saleem 41 (55); Mehran Mumtaz 2/22 (9 overs)		Mubasir Khan 99* (105); Khurram Shahzad 2/32 (7 overs)

Rawalpindi won by 7 wickets
Abbottabad Cricket Stadium, Abbottabad
Umpires: Tariq Rasheed and Farooq Ali

- Rawalpindi won the toss and elected to field.
- Points: Rawalpindi 2, Faisalabad 0

7 November 2023
09:30
Scorecard

FATA; 189 (42.5 overs)	v	Multan; 129 (33.1 overs)
Mohammad Sarwar 53 (80); Zahid Mahmood 3/21 (9 overs)		Sharoon Siraj 58 (82); Khushdil Shah 3/23 (8 overs)

FATA won by 60 runs
Mirpur Cricket Stadium, Mirpur
Umpires: Mohammad Sajid and Nasir Hussain

- Multan won the toss and elected to field.
- Mujtaba Khan (Multan) made his List A debut.
- Points: FATA 2, Multan 0

==== Round 5 ====
9 November 2023
09:30
Scorecard

FATA; 130/4 (22.1 overs)	v	Lahore Whites; 128 (38.1 overs)
Mohammad Farooq 40 (30); Mohammad Rameez 2/25 (6 overs)		Ahmed Daniyal 32 (42); Asif Afridi 3/15 (9 overs)

FATA won by 6 wickets
Mirpur Cricket Stadium, Mirpur
Umpires: Abdul Muqeet and Ghulam Sarwar

- FATA won the toss and elected to field.
- Shahid Aziz (FATA) made his List A debut.
- Points: FATA 2, Lahore Whites 0

9 November 2023
09:30
Scorecard

Faisalabad; 142/7 (27.3)	v	Peshawar; 264 (45 overs)
Asif Ali 30 (27); Abbas Afridi 2/29 (6 overs)		Sahibzada Farhan 66 (106); Arshad Iqbal 5/67 (9 overs)

Peshawar won by 68 runs (DLS method)
Rawalpindi Cricket Stadium, Rawalpindi
Umpires: Imran Javed and Tariq Rasheed

- Faisalabad won the toss and elected to field.
- Concussion sub: Asim Ali in, Ali Shan out (2nd innings, 22.1 ov)
- Concussion sub: Mohammad Huraira in, Faheem Ashraf out (2nd innings, 22.1 ov)
- Points: Peshawar 2, Faisalabad 0

9 November 2023
09:30
Scorecard

Karachi Whites; 364/7 (45 overs)	v	Rawalpindi; 169/5 (27 overs)
Saim Ayub 179 (125); Shoaib Aamir 1/37 (6 overs)		Abdul Faseeh 54 (45); Noman Ali 3/19 (6 overs)

Karachi W won by 72 runs (DLS method)
Shoaib Akhtar Stadium, Rawalpindi
Umpires: Imtiaz Iqbal and Waleed Yaqub

- Rawalpindi won the toss and elected to field.
- Abdul Faseeh and Shoaib Aamir (Rawalpindi) Both made their List A debuts.
- Points: Karachi Whites 2, Rawalpindi 0

9 November 2023
09:30
Scorecard

Lahore Blues; 257/7 (40 overs)	v	Multan; 163/4 (21.2 overs)
Hussain Talat 70 (56); Tahir Hussain 3/56 (8 overs)		Sharjeel Khan 82* (63); Usman Qadir 1/17 (2 overs)

Multan won by 37 runs (DLS method)
Abbottabad Cricket Stadium, Abbottabad

- Multan won the toss and elected to field.
- Mohammad Sadaqat (Multan) made his List A debut.
- Points: Multan 2, Lahore Blues 0

==== Round 6 ====
11 November 2023
09:30
Scorecard

Peshawar	v	Lahore Whites

Match abandoned without a ball bowled
Abbottabad Cricket Stadium, Abbottabad
Umpires: Saqib Khan and Farooq Ali

- No toss
- Points: Lahore Whites 1, Peshawar 1

11 November 2023
09:30
Scorecard

Faisalabad; 229/8(45 Overs)	v	FATA; 231/7(44.2 Overs)
Asif Ali 78 (72); Khushdil Shah 2/36 (9 overs)		Salman Khan 66 (74); Khurram Shahzad 4/32 (9 overs)

FATA won by 3 wickets
Mirpur Cricket Stadium, Mirpur
Umpires: Abdul Muqeet and Faisal Afridi

- FATA won the toss and elected to field.
- Points: FATA 2, Faisalabad 0
- Awaiz Zafar and Bilal Mehdi (Faisalabad) Both made their List A debuts.

11 November 2023
09:30
Scorecard

Lahore Blues; 256/5(45 Overs)	v	Rawalpindi; 258/7(44.1 Overs)
Hussain Talat 69* (67); Kashif Ali 2/28 (9 overs)		Abdul Faseeh 114 (106); Umaid Asif 3/47 (9 overs)

Rawalpindi won by 3 wickets
Rawalpindi Cricket Stadium, Rawalpindi
Umpires: Imran Javed and Tariq Rasheed

- Rawalpindi won the toss and elected to field.
- Points: Rawalpindi 2, Lahore Blues 0

11 November 2023
09:30
Scorecard

Karachi Whites	v	Multan

Match abandoned without a ball bowled
Shoaib Akhtar Stadium, Rawalpindi
Umpires: Imtiaz Iqbal and Waleed Yaqub

- No toss
- Points: Karachi Whites 1, Multan 1

==== Round 7 ====
13 November 2023
09:30
Scorecard

Faisalabad; 293/8 (45 overs)	v	Lahore Whites; 191/10(43.4 Overs)
Muhammad Faizan 70 (63); Aamer Jamal 3/55 (9 overs)		Tayyab Tahir 46 (52); Khurram Shahzad 4/37 (9 overs)

Faisalabad won by 102 runs
Rawalpindi Cricket Stadium, Rawalpindi
Umpires: Imtiaz Iqbal and Mohammad Asif

- Faisalabad won the toss and elected to Bat.
- Shehzad Akhtar (Faisalabad) made his List A debut.
- Points: Faisalabad 2, Lahore Whites 0

13 November 2023
09:30
Scorecard

Peshawar; 112 (33 overs)	v	FATA; 113/2 (25.3 overs)
Niaz Khan 40 (54); Usman Shinwari 5/14 (8 overs)		Samiullah 64 (74); Mohammad Ilyas 1/19 (4 overs)

FATA won by 8 wickets
Abbottabad Cricket Stadium, Abbottabad
Umpires: Saqib Khan and Imran Javed

- FATA won the toss and elected to field.
- Haris Ali Shah (Peshawar) made his List A debut.
- Points: FATA 2, Peshawar 0

13 November 2023
09:30
Scorecard

Multan; 44/7(43.2 Overs)	v	Rawalpindi; 242/9 (45 overs)
Sharjeel Khan 106 (84); Kashif Ali 2/36 (9 overs)		Haider Ali 78* (70); Zahid Mahmood 3/39 (9 overs)

Multan won by 3 wickets
Shoaib Akhtar Stadium, Rawalpindi
Umpires: Rashid Riaz and Tariq Rasheed

- Multan won the toss and elected to field.
- Rehman Khan (Rawalpindi) and Saim Ayyaz (Multan) Both made their List A debuts.
- oints: Multan 2, Rawalpindi 0

13 November 2023
09:30
Scorecard

Karachi Whites; 201/4(28.4 Overs)	v	Lahore Blues; 197/9 (40 overs)
Shan Masood 99 (68); Kashif Bhatti 2/21 (6 overs)		Hussain Talat 51 (60); Danish Aziz 2/27 (6 overs)

Karachi Whites won by 6 wickets
Mirpur Cricket Stadium, Mirpur
Umpires: Abdul Muqeet and Faisal Afridi

- Karachi Whites won the toss and elected to field.
- Habibullah (Karachi Whites) made his List A debut.
- Points: Karachi Whites 2, Lahore Blues 0

== Knockout stage ==
Semi-finals
1	Peshawar	245/7 (45 overs)
4	FATA	201/10 (41.1 overs)
2	Karachi Whites	280/10 (44.3 overs)
3	Multan	229/9 (41 overs)

Final
SFW1	Peshawar	108/5 (17.2 overs)
SFW2	Karachi Whites	103/10 (31.2 overs)

=== Semi-finals ===
16 November 2023
09:30
Scorecard

Peshawar; 245/7 (45 overs)	v	FATA; 201 (41.1 overs)
Sahibzada Farhan 69 (76); Shahid Aziz 3/55 (8 overs)		Mohammad Sarwar 56 (45); Abbas Afridi 3/34 (8 overs)

Peshawar won by 44 runs
Rawalpindi Cricket Stadium, Rawalpindi
Umpires: Imran Javed and Nasir Hussain

- FATA won the toss and elected to field.

17 November 2023
09:30
Scorecard

Karachi Whites; 280 (44.3 overs)	v	Multan; 229/9 (41 overs)
Saim Ayub 95 (86); Mohammad Imran 3/58 (8 overs)		Haseebullah Khan 106 (108); Sohail Khan 4/44 (9 overs)

Karachi Whites won by 51 runs (DLS method)
Rawalpindi Cricket Stadium, Rawalpindi
Umpires: Faisal Afridi and Rashid Riaz

- Multan won the toss and elected to field.

=== Final ===
19 November 2023
09:30
Scorecard

Peshawar; 108/5 (17.2 overs)	v	Karachi Whites; 103 (31.2 overs)
Mohammad Haris 46 (33); Noman Ali 2/19 (3 overs)		Azam Khan 30 (46); Mohammad Imran 4/28 (7.2 overs)

Peshawar won by 5 wickets
Rawalpindi Cricket Stadium, Rawalpindi
Umpires: Ahsan Raza and Faisal Afridi
Player of the match: Mohammad Imran (Peshawar)

- Peshawar won the toss and elected to field.
