= 2025 Hanif Mohammad Trophy =

2nd edition of Hanif Mohammad Trophy

- Dates: 29 August – 25 September 2025
- Administrator: Pakistan Cricket Board
- Cricket format: Four day cricket
- Participants: 12
- Matches: 30
- Most runs: Mohammad Suleman (656)
- Most wickets: Asif Afridi (33); Jawad Ali (33)

The 2025 Hanif Mohammad Trophy was a domestic non-first-class cricket competition in Pakistan. It was the second edition of the Hanif Mohammad Trophy, and it was contested by twelve teams representing regional cricket associations. Twelve teams were divided into two groups where each team played five games. Initially the top of each group were supposed to advanced for the 2025–26 Quaid-e-Azam Trophy, but later Pakistan Cricket Board (PCB) decided to allow top of each group along with two more team with highest ponts across the two groups qualify for the QEAT. As a result, Karachi Blues (96) and Multan (86) joined respective group toppers FATA (108) and Faisalabad (87) for the 2025–26 Quaid-e-Azam Trophy on the virtue of finishing as the next two teams with the most points.

== Teams ==
The teams were placed into the following groups:

- Group A: Azad Jammu & Kashmir, Faisalabad, Hyderabad, Karachi Whites, Lahore Blues, Quetta
- Group B: Dera Murad Jamali, FATA, Karachi Blues, Larkana, Multan, Rawalpindi

In the group stage of the competition, each team played each of the other five teams in its group once.

== Standings ==
=== Group A ===
Pos	Team	Pld	W	L	D	Pts	
1	Faisalabad	5	2	0	3	87	Qualified for the 2025–26 Quaid-e-Azam Trophy
2	Lahore Blues	5	2	0	3	74	
3	Karachi Whites	5	2	2	1	68	
4	Azad Jammu and Kashmir	5	1	1	3	58	
5	Hyderabad	5	0	1	4	50	
6	Quetta	5	0	3	2	23	

Source: PCB

=== Group B ===
Pos	Team	Pld	W	L	D	Pts	
1	FATA	5	4	0	1	108	Qualified for the 2025–26 Quaid-e-Azam Trophy
2	Karachi Blues	5	3	1	1	96	Qualified for the 2025–26 Quaid-e-Azam Trophy
3	Multan	5	3	1	1	86	Qualified for the 2025–26 Quaid-e-Azam Trophy
4	Rawalpindi	5	2	2	1	62	
5	Larkana	5	1	4	0	42	
6	Dera Murad Jamali	5	0	5	0	17	

Source: PCB

== Fixtures ==
=== Group A ===
==== Round 1 ====
29 August – 1 September 2025
Scorecard

Faisalabad; 469 (124.1 overs)	v	Lahore Blues; 286 (64 overs)

Match drawn
Multan Cricket Stadium, Multan
Points: Faisalabad 10, Lahore Blues 9

29 August – 1 September 2025
Scorecard

Hyderabad; 637 (140.2 overs) & 63/3 (15 overs)	v	Karachi Whites; 666 (170 overs)

Match drawn
Abbasia Sports Complex, Punjab
Points: Karachi Whites 11, Hyderabad 11

29 August – 1 September 2025
Scorecard

Quetta; 213 (58.1 overs)	v	Azad Jammu and Kashmir; 368 (106 overs)

Match drawn
Dring Stadium, Bahawalpur
Points: Azad Jammu and Kashmir 14, Quetta 7

==== Round 2 ====
4–7 September 2025
Scorecard

Quetta; 216 (66.2 overs) & 331 (108.4 overs)	v	Karachi Whites; 542/7d (126.2 overs) & 8/0 (0.4 over)

Karachi Whites won by 10 wickets
Abbasia Sports Complex, Punjab

4–7 September 2025
Scorecard

Azad Jammu and Kashmir; 298 (96.2 overs) & 51/4 (29 overs)	v	Faisalabad; 413 (115.3 overs)

Match drawn
Dring Stadium, Bahawalpur
Points: Azad Jammu and Kashmir 10, Faisalabad 13

4–7 September 2025
Scorecard

Hyderabad; 524 (142.1 overs)	v	Lahore Blues; 198/5 (50 overs)

Match drawn
Multan Cricket Stadium, Multan
Points: Hyderabad 11, Lahore Blues 6

==== Round 3 ====
11–14 September 2025
Scorecard

Hyderabad; 480 (122.3 overs) & 191/7d (35 overs)	v	Quetta; 286 (89 overs) & 272/7 (86.4 overs)

Match drawn
Abbasia Sports Complex, Punjab

11–14 September 2025
Scorecard

Lahore Blues; 71 (21.5 overs) & 312 (90.1 overs)	v	Azad Jammu and Kashmir; 169 (55 overs) & 214 (66 overs)

Match tied
Dring Stadium, Bahawalpur

11–14 September 2025
Scorecard

Faisalabad; 387 (123.5 overs) & 300 (87.2 overs)	v	Karachi Whites; 140 (41 overs) & 55/3 (6.4 overs)

Faisalabad won by 7 wickets
Multan Cricket Stadium, Multan

==== Round 4 ====
16–19 September 2025
Scorecard

Azad Jammu & Kashmir; 359 (103.5 overs) & 238 (74.5 overs)	v	Hyderabad; 482 (132 overs) & 79 (30.5 overs)

Azad Jammu & Kashmir won by 36 runs
Abbasia Sports Complex, Punjab

16–19 September 2025
Scorecard

Quetta; 187 (72.1 overs) & 137 (33.3 overs)	v	Faisalabad; 416 (93.1 overs)

Faisalabad won by an innings and 92 runs
Multan Cricket Stadium, Multan

16–19 September 2025
Scorecard

Lahore Blues; 297 (82 overs) & 257 (74.3 overs)	v	Karachi Whites; 94 (32.1 overs) & 203 (61 overs)

Lahore Blues won by 257 runs
Dring Stadium, Bahawalpur

==== Round 5 ====
22–25 September 2025
Scorecard

Faisalabad; 169 (60.4 overs) & 381 (110.2 overs)	v	Hyderabad; 189 (80.1 overs) & 226/8 (90.5 overs)

Match drawn
Dring Stadium, Bahawalpur

22–25 September 2025
Scorecard

Lahore Blues; 450 (90.3 overs) & 382/5d (64 overs)	v	Quetta; 552 (155.5 overs) & 92 (44.3 overs)

Lahore Blues won by 188 runs
Abbasia Sports Complex, Punjab

22–25 September 2025
Scorecard

Karachi Whites; 450/8d (136 overs) & 47/4 (9.1 overs)	v	Azad Jammu and Kashmir; 175 (71.3 overs) & 320 (115.2 oversd) (f/o)

Karachi Whites won by 6 wickets
Multan Cricket Stadium, Multan

=== Group B ===
==== Round 1 ====
29 August – 1 September 2025
Scorecard

Rawalpindi; 375 (108.5 overs) & 260/8d (67 overs)	v	FATA; 331 (104.3 overs) & 149/4 (51 overs)

Match drawn
National Stadium, Karachi, Karachi
Points: Rawalpindi 11, FATA 9

29 August – 1 September 2025
Scorecard

Multan; 454/8d (117.4 overs) & 265/3 (70.1 overs)	v	Karachi Blues; 418 (144 overs)

Match drawn
State Bank of Pakistan Sports Complex, Karachi
Points: Multan 11, Karachi Blues 10

29 August – 1 September 2025
Scorecard

Larkana; 311 (89.4 overs) & 330/5d (81.2 overs)	v	Dera Murad Jamali; 166 (55.2 overs) & 201 (62.5 overs)

Larkana won by 274 runs
United Bank Limited Sports Complex, Karachi
Points: Larkana 25, Dera Murad Jamali 3

==== Round 2 ====
4–7 September 2025
Scorecard

Dera Murad Jamali; 361 (111.1 overs) & 142 (42.4 overs)	v	Multan; 664/5d (110.3 overs)

Multan won by an innings and 161 runs
National Stadium, Karachi, Karachi
Points: Multan 24, Dera Murad Jamali 3

4–7 September 2025
Scorecard

Rawalpindi; 174 (43.3 overs) & 383 (79.4 overs)	v	Larkana; 160 (51.3 overs) & 195 (67.2 overs)

Rawalpindi won by 202 runs
State Bank of Pakistan Sports Complex, Karachi

4–7 September 2025
Scorecard

Karachi Blues; 220 (70.2 overs) & 214 (64.1 overs)	v	FATA; 165 (59.5 overs) & 270/5 (89.2 overs)

FATA won by 5 wickets
United Bank Limited Sports Complex, Karachi
Points: FATA 21, Karachi Blues 7

==== Round 3 ====
11–14 September 2025
Scorecard

Dera Murad Jamali; 180 (52.1 overs) & 229 (100.1 overs)	v	Karachi Blues; 401/8d (76.1 overs) & 9/0 (1.1 overs)

Karachi Blues won by 10 wickets
National Stadium, Karachi, Karachi

11–14 September 2025
Scorecard

Larkana; 197 (73.1 overs) & 127 (50.1 overs)	v	FATA; 420 (85.4 overs)

FATA won by an innings and 96 runs
State Bank of Pakistan Sports Complex, Karachi

11–14 September 2025
Scorecard

Multan; 356/7d (119.1 overs) & 296 (81.5 overs)	v	Rawalpindi; 108 (40.2 overs) & 52/1 (8.5 overs)

Multan won by 9 wickets
United Bank Limited Sports Complex, Karachi

==== Round 4 ====
16–19 September 2025
Scorecard

Karachi Blues; 335 (63.3 overs)	v	Larkana; 81 (21.2 overs) & 120 (35.1 overs) (f/o)

Karachi Blues won by an innings and 134 runs
State Bank of Pakistan Sports Complex, Karachi

16–19 September 2025
Scorecard

Dera Murad Jamali; 120 (45.4 overs) & 334 (126.2 overs)	v	Rawalpindi; 377 (93.3 overs) & 71/1 (13.3 overs)

Rawalpindi won by 9 wickets
National Bank of Pakistan Sports Complex, Karachi

16–19 September 2025
Scorecard

FATA; 284 (90.4 overs) & 160 (57.2 overs)	v	Multan; 231 (73.2 overs) & 132 (53 overs)

FATA won by 81 runs
United Bank Limited Sports Complex, Karachi

==== Round 5 ====
22–25 September 2025
Scorecard

Rawalpindi; 184 (56.2 overs) & 285 (76.3 overs)	v	Karachi Blues; 425 (104.3 overs) & 45/1 (5.5 overs)

Karachi Blues won by 9 wickets
United Bank Limited Sports Complex, Karachi

22–25 September 2025

FATA; 311 (95.4 overs)	v	Dera Murad Jamali; 153 (52 overs) & 121 (39.3 overs) (f/o)

FATA won by an innings and 37 runs
State Bank of Pakistan Sports Complex, Karachi

22–25 September 2025
Scorecard

Larkana; 329 (95 overs) & 204 (54 overs)	v	Multan; 514 (119 overs) & 23/0 (3.2 overs)

Multan won by 10 wickets
National Stadium, Karachi, Karachi
