= Shahid Aziz (cricketer) =

Pakistani cricketer (born 2003)

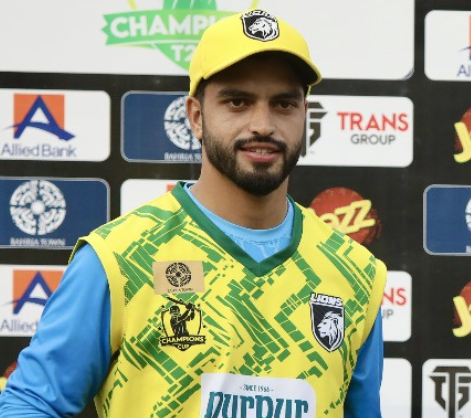

Personal information
- Born: 23 March 2003 (age 23); Kurram District, Khyber Pakhtunkhwa, Pakistan
- Batting: Right-handed
- Bowling: Right-arm Medium
- Role: All-rounder

Domestic team information
- Years: Team
- 2023-present: Federally Administered Tribal Areas cricket team
- 2023–2025: Karachi Kings

Shahid Aziz (Urdu: شاہد عزیز, Pashto: شاهد عزیز; born 23 March 2003) is a Pakistani cricketer who is a right arm medium fast bowler and Right-handed batter for Multan Sultans and the Federally Administered Tribal Areas cricket team

== Career ==
On November 9, 2023, he played for the Federally Administered Tribal Areas cricket team in the 2023–24 Pakistan Cup, making his List A debut. From October 16 to 19, 2023, Aziz made his first-class debut for the Federally Administered Tribal Areas cricket team in the 2023–24 Quaid-e-Azam Trophy. He made his Twenty20 debut on November 23, 2023 while playing in the 2023–24 National T20 Cup for the Federally Administered Tribal Areas cricket team. Aziz joined the Multan Sultans to play in the 2025 Pakistan Super League Tournament.
