= 2024–25 Quaid-e-Azam Trophy =

Pakistani cricket competition

- Dates: 26 October 2024 – 6 January 2025
- Administrator: Pakistan Cricket Board
- Cricket format: First-class
- Tournament format(s): Round-robin, finals
- Host: Pakistan
- Champions: Sialkot (3rd title)
- Runners-up: Peshawar
- Participants: 18
- Matches: 49
- Player of the series: Niaz Khan (Peshawar)
- Most runs: Azan Awais (Sialkot) (844)
- Most wickets: Niaz Khan (Peshawar) (39)
- Official website: PCB

The 2024–25 Quaid-e-Azam Trophy was a first-class domestic cricket competition held in Pakistan during the 2024–25 season from 26 October to 6 January 2025. It was the 67th edition of the Quaid-e-Azam Trophy, contested by 18 teams representing regional cricket associations.

== Format ==
For the 2024–25 competition the number of teams was increased from eight to 18, in three pools of six teams each. Three of the teams – Larkana Region, Azad Jammu & Kashmir Region and Dera Murad Jamali Region – were competing at the first-class level for the first time.

- Pool A: Abbottabad Region, Faisalabad Region, Hyderabad Region, Islamabad Region, Lahore Region Whites, Larkana Region
- Pool B: Azad Jammu & Kashmir Region, Bahawalpur Region, Karachi Region Whites, Multan Region, Peshawar Region, Rawalpindi Region
- Pool C: Dera Murad Jamali Region, Federally Administered Tribal Areas Region, Karachi Region Blues, Lahore Region Blues, Quetta Region, Sialkot Region

After a 15-match round-robin in each pool, the top team from each pool took part in a three-team, three-match series. The top two teams from this series then played off in the final, beginning on 2 January.

== Tables ==
=== Pool A ===
Team	Pld	W	L	D	T	NR	Pts	Qualification or relegation
Lahore Whites	5	4	1	0	0	0	99	Advance to Triangular Stage
Islamabad	5	3	2	0	0	0	87	
Abbottabad	5	3	2	0	0	0	84	Relegated to 2025 Hanif Mohammad Trophy
Faisalabad	5	3	2	0	0	0	82	Relegated to 2025 Hanif Mohammad Trophy
Hyderabad	5	2	3	0	0	0	71	Relegated to 2025 Hanif Mohammad Trophy
Larkana	5	0	5	0	0	0	32	Relegated to 2025 Hanif Mohammad Trophy

=== Pool B ===
Team	Pld	W	L	D	T	NR	Pts	Qualification or relegation
Peshawar	5	3	0	2	0	0	89	Advance to Triangular Stage
Bahawalpur	5	3	1	1	0	0	83	
Rawalpindi	5	2	1	2	0	0	79	Relegated to 2025 Hanif Mohammad Trophy
Karachi Whites	5	1	2	2	0	0	58	Relegated to 2025 Hanif Mohammad Trophy
Multan	5	1	2	2	0	0	54	Relegated to 2025 Hanif Mohammad Trophy
Azad Jammu & Kashmir	5	0	4	1	0	0	28	Relegated to 2025 Hanif Mohammad Trophy

=== Pool C ===
Team	Pld	W	L	D	T	NR	Pts	Qualification or relegation
Sialkot	5	3	0	2	0	0	90	Advance to Triangular Stage
FATA	5	2	1	2	0	0	77	
Lahore Blues	5	2	2	1	0	0	68	Relegated to 2025 Hanif Mohammad Trophy
Karachi Blues	5	2	2	1	0	0	65	Relegated to 2025 Hanif Mohammad Trophy
Quetta	5	1	3	1	0	0	53	Relegated to 2025 Hanif Mohammad Trophy
Dera Murad Jamali	5	1	3	1	0	0	45	Relegated to 2025 Hanif Mohammad Trophy

=== Triangular Stage ===
Pos	Team	Pld	W	L	D	Pts	Qualification
1	Sialkot	2	1	0	1	36	Advanced for the final
2	Peshawar	2	1	1	0	25	Advanced for the final
3	Lahore Whites	2	0	1	1	13	

Source: ESPNcricinfo

== Triangular stage ==
26–29 November 2024
Scorecard

Peshawar	v	Sialkot
171 (46.1 overs); Obaidullah 35 (44); Mohammad Ali 4/35 (16.1 overs)		410 (133.1 overs); Azan Awais 203* (407); Mohammad Amir Khan 5/141 (40.1 overs)
182 (34.4 overs); Sajjad Ibrahim 44 (57); Shoaib Akhtar 6/51 (13 overs)

Sialkot won by an innings and 57 runs
Abbottabad Cricket Stadium, Abbottabad
Umpires: Saqib Khan and Ahmed Shahab

- Peshawar won the toss and elected to bat.
- Points: Sialkot 27, Peshawar 1

2–5 December 2024
Scorecard

Peshawar	v	Lahore Whites
332 (82.2 overs); Maaz Sadaqat 95 (97); Ahmed Bashir 3/54 (19.2 overs)		217 (56.3 overs); Obaid Shahid 75 (105); Sajid Khan 5/56 (17 overs)
141 (40 overs); Nabi Gul 83* (138); Mohammad Salman 3/31 (12 overs)		131 (23.3 overs); Saad Nasim 56 (62); Sajid Khan 5/43 (6.3 overs)

Peshawar won by 125 runs
Abbottabad Cricket Stadium, Abbottabad
Umpires: Imtiaz Iqbal and Imran Javed

- Lahore Whites won the toss and elected to field.
- Points: Peshawar 24, Lahore Whites 4

27–30 December 2024
Scorecard

Sialkot	v	Lahore Whites
465 (119.3 overs); Azan Awais 168 (293); Mohammad Waheed 5/124 (32.3 overs)		639 (153.1 overs); Ali Zaryab 206* (372); Shahzaib Bhatti 5/236 (57.1 overs)
260/6 (67 overs); Azan Awais 121 (169); Mohammad Ahsan 2/47 (22 overs)

Match drawn
National Stadium, Karachi
Umpires: Imtiaz Iqbal and Imran Javed

- Sialkot won the toss and elected to bat.
- Shahzaib Bhatti and Fahad Jamil (Sialkot) both made their first-class debuts.
- Points: Sialkot 9, Lahore Whites 9

== Final ==
2–6 January 2025
Scorecard

Peshawar	v	Sialkot
258 (80.1 overs); Zubair Khan 47 (126); Amad Butt 4/51 (19.1 overs)		245 (85 overs); Mohsin Riaz 57 (130); Niaz Khan 5/61 (26 overs)
159 (59.5 overs); Maaz Sadaqat 57 (79); Ali Raza 7/48 (14 overs)		176/9 (46.2 overs); Amad Butt 65 (94); Niaz Khan 4/51 (17 overs)

Sialkot won by 1 wicket
United Bank Limited Sports Complex, Karachi
Umpires: Faisal Afridi and Rashid Riaz
Player of the match: Amad Butt (Sialkot)

- Sialkot won the toss and elected to field.
- Ali Raza (Sialkot) took his first five-wicket haul in first-class cricket.
