= Saad Khan (cricketer) =

Pakistani cricketer (born 1999)

Personal information
- Born: 16 November 1999 (age 26); Hyderabad, Sindh, Pakistan
- Batting: Left-handed
- Bowling: Slow left-arm orthodox
- Role: Allrounder

Domestic team information
- Years: Team
- 2018/19–2020: Habib Bank Limited
- 2021: Sindh
- 2025/26: Bahawalpur

Career statistics
Competition	FC	LA	T20
Matches	50	17	18
Runs scored	3,428	275	330
Batting average	44.51	18.33	25.38
100s/50s	8/20	0/1	0/1
Top score	215	57*	53
Balls bowled	1,195	244	73
Wickets	19	6	5
Bowling average	44.36	38.33	17.60
5 wickets in innings	0	0	0
10 wickets in match	0	0	0
Best bowling	3/55	3/38	2/17
Catches/stumpings	54/–	8/–	10/–
- Source: Cricinfo, 2 November 2025

Saad Khan (born 16 November 1999) is a Pakistani cricketer.

Khan made his first-class debut for Habib Bank Limited in the 2018–19 Quaid-e-Azam Trophy on 1 September 2018. Prior to his first-class debut, he was named in Pakistan's squad for the 2018 Under-19 Cricket World Cup. He made his List A debut for Habib Bank Limited in the 2018–19 Quaid-e-Azam One Day Cup on 16 October 2018.

In Bahawalpur's eight-wicket victory over Karachi Region Blues in the 2025–26 Quaid-e-Azam Trophy, Khan scored 61 and 103 not out – 164 of his team's total of 330 runs for the match. Three weeks earlier, in the first round of the competition, he had scored 215 against Islamabad.
