= Nisar Afridi =

Pakistani cricketer (born 1999)

Personal information
- Born: 20 October 1999 (age 27); Peshawar, Pakistan
- Source: Cricinfo, 4 November 2017

Nisar Afridi (born 20 October 1999) is a Pakistani cricketer. Muhammad Nisar Afridi was born in Khyber Agency, Pakistan. He made his first-class debut for Federally Administered Tribal Areas in the 2017–18 Quaid-e-Azam Trophy on 2 November 2017.
