= Jahandad Khan (cricketer) =

Pakistani cricketer (born 2003)

Personal information
- Full name: Jahandad Khan
- Born: 16 June 2003 (age 23); Rawalpindi, Punjab, Pakistan
- Batting: Left-handed
- Bowling: Left-arm medium-fast
- Role: All-rounder

International information
- National side: Pakistan (2024–2025)
- T20I debut (cap 118): 18 November 2024 v Australia
- Last T20I: 26 March 2025 v New Zealand
- T20I shirt no.: 58

Domestic team information
- Years: Team
- 2023–present: Rawalpindi
- 2024–present: Pakistan Television
- 2024–present: Lahore Qalandars
- 2024–present: Stallions
- 2024–present: Fortune Barishal
- 2026–present: Kathmandu Gorkhas

Career statistics
Competition	T20I	First-class	List A	T20
Matches	8	6	23	38
Runs scored	29	190	221	249
Batting average	7.25	17.27	15.78	15.56
100s/50s	0/0	0/1	0/1	0/0
Top score	17	67	51*	45*
Balls bowled	108	1,049	972	674
Wickets	7	29	40	38
Bowling average	30.14	23.62	24.55	27.28
5 wickets in innings	0	1	0	0
10 wickets in match	0	0	0	0
Best bowling	2/30	7/65	4/49	3/9
Catches/stumpings	1/–	2/–	10/–	6/–
- Source: Cricinfo, 26 March 2025

Jahandad Khan (Note: Urdu: جہانداد خان) (born 16 June 2003) is a Pakistani cricketer who plays as a left-arm medium-fast bowler and left hand batter for Rawalpindi and Pakistan national team. He has also played for Lahore Qalandars in the Pakistan Super League.

== Domestic career ==
He made his first-class debut for Rawalpindi against Karachi on 10 October 2023 in the 2023–24 Quaid-e-Azam Trophy. He made his List A debut against FATA on 1 November 2023 in the 2023–24 Pakistan Cup. He made his T20 debut against Abbottabad on 24 November 2024 in the 2023–24 National T20 Cup. He also played Pakistan Super League in 2024 for Lahore Qalandars. He played 2024–25 Champions One-Day Cup for Stallions.

He took his first ever five-wicket haul in first-class cricket in the 2023–24 President's Trophy against State Bank of Pakistan (7/65).

== International career ==
In October 2024, he was called up to Pakistan T20I side for the series against Australia and Zimbabwe. Khan made his Twenty20 International (T20I) debut for Pakistan against Australia on 18 November 2024 in the third match of the tour.
