= Misbah-ul-Haq =

Pakistani cricketer

PP SI Misbah-ul-Haq
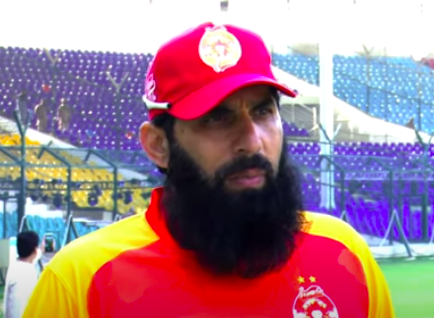
- Misbah-ul-Haq

Personal information
- Full name: Misbah-ul-Haq Khan Niazi
- Born: 28 May 1974 (age 52); Mianwali, Punjab, Pakistan
- Height: 184 cm (6 ft 0 in)
- Batting: Right-handed
- Bowling: Right-arm leg break
- Role: Batsman

International information
- National side: Pakistan (2001–2017)
- Test debut (cap 166): 8 March 2001 v New Zealand
- Last Test: 14 May 2017 v West Indies
- ODI debut (cap 142): 27 April 2002 v New Zealand
- Last ODI: 20 March 2015 v Australia
- ODI shirt no.: 22
- T20I debut: 2 September 2007 v Bangladesh
- Last T20I: 27 February 2012 v England

Domestic team information
- Years: Team
- 1998–2001: Sargodha
- 2000–2003: Khan Research Laboratories
- 2003–2016: Faisalabad
- 2003–2016: Sui Northern Gas Pipelines
- 2005–2015: Faisalabad Wolves
- 2006–2008: Punjab
- 2008–2009: Baluchistan
- 2008: Royal Challengers Bangalore
- 2015: Rangpur Riders
- 2015: Barbados Tridents
- 2016–2018: Islamabad United
- 2017: Chittagong Vikings
- 2019: Peshawar Zalmi

Career statistics
Competition	Test	ODI	FC	LA
Matches	75	162	242	292
Runs scored	5,222	5,122	17,139	9,941
Batting average	46.62	43.40	48.69	46.89
100s/50s	10/39	0/42	43/101	11/70
Top score	161*	96*	284	129*
Balls bowled	–	24	324	144
Wickets	–	0	3	1
Bowling average	–	–	82.00	179.00
5 wickets in innings	–	–	0	0
10 wickets in match	–	–	0	0
Best bowling	–	–	1/2	1/10
Catches/stumpings	50/–	66/–	204/–	128/–
Medal record
Men's Cricket
Representing Pakistan
T20 World Cup
Winner	2009 England and Wales
Runner-up	2007 South Africa
Asia Cup
Winner	2012 Bangladesh
Runner-up	2014 Bangladesh
- Source: ESPNcricinfo, 12 July 2017

Pride of Performance Award Recipient
- Date: 2014
- Country: Islamic Republic of Pakistan
- Presented by: Islamic Republic of Pakistan

Misbah-ul-Haq Khan Niazi PP SI (Urdu: مصباح الحق خان نیازی; born 28 May 1974) is a former Pakistani international cricketer and former cricket coach. Misbah captained Pakistan national cricket team in all formats and is former head coach and former chief selector of the national team. As captain, he led Pakistan to being the champions of the 2012 Asia Cup. Misbah was a member of the team that won the 2009 ICC World Twenty20, two years after the defeat from the final in the previous tournament.

A late bloomer, Misbah was a middle-order batsman best known for his composure with the bat whilst also having the ability to be an aggressive big shot player when required. Misbah scored the fastest fifty in Test cricket and set a new record for the fastest Test hundred and holds the record for most career ODI runs without a century.

Misbah has an MBA degree in Human Resource Management from the University of Management and Technology in Lahore, Punjab.

After announcing retirement from limited overs cricket in 2015, Misbah continued to play Test cricket for a few years. On 4 April 2017, Misbah announced his retirement from all international cricket as well after the conclusion of West Indies tour. Misbah retired from all formats of international cricket on 14 May 2017.

== Early and personal life ==
Misbah-ul-Haq Khan Niazi was born on 28 May 1974 in Mianwali, a city in Punjab, Pakistan. Both his parents, Abdul Qudoos Khan Niazi and Balqees Khan Niazi, were school principals. His father died when he was in college and was raised by his mother alone. He has two elder sisters, one with a Master of Physics while the other being a medical doctor. The Pakistan cricketer and former Prime Minister of Pakistan Imran Khan is his distant cousin. During his early days, Misbah played tape ball cricket for his hometown, but his parents insisted on him securing a good education and he completed a BSc in Mathematics and Physics from Government College University Faisalabad. He then enrolled in the University of Management and Technology Lahore to pursue an MBA degree in Human resource management which he completed in 2012.

Misbah would eventually make his first-class debut in 1998, aged 24 for Sargodha. Misbah went on to be selected for the Pakistani Test team in 2001 and the ODI cricket team in 2002.

Misbah married Uzma Khan, a painter, in 2004. The couple have two children: a daughter, Noriza Khan Niazi, and a son, Faham-ul-Haq Khan Niazi, who is also a cricketer.

== Domestic career ==
Misbah had not only gained success at international level but also at domestic level. His 2012–13 domestic season was memorable. He captained Faisalabad Wolves in Twenty20 domestic tournament and SNGPL in First-class and List-A domestic tournament. First, he took SNGPL to victory in President's Trophy against Younus Khan's HBL and then Faisalabad Wolves to victory in Faysal Bank Super 8 against Shoaib Malik's Sialkot Stallions in final surprisingly. Though Faisalabad Wolves lost final earlier in Faysal Bank T20 Cup against Mohammad Hafeez's Lahore Lions but they took their revenge in Super 8 tournament in semi-final and eventually winning the tournament and more importantly qualifying for the Champions League T20. And at last Misbah led SNGPL to another victory in domestic list-A tournament, President's Cup against Rana Naved-ul-Hasan's WAPDA in final. Misbah won all domestic tournaments (Twenty20, first-class and list-A) in domestic season 2012/13.

Misbah played in 2008 Indian Premier League Season 1 for Royal Challengers Bangalore while he played in Sri Lanka Premier League for Kandurata Warriors in 2012. And he also represented St Lucia Zouks in 2013 season in Caribbean Premier League. He also played for Abhani in Bangladesh.

Misbah revealed that he had been offered a two-year contract by Worcestershire County Cricket Club to play in the English County Championship from 2013 onwards, but declined due to clashes with his international commitments.

In 2015, Misbah signed by Rangpur Riders to play in the third edition of the Bangladesh Premier League. He made the decision to play in order to remain match fit for the upcoming Test Series with England in July 2016. In only his first game for Rangpur Riders, Misbah scored 61 runs, smashing 4 sixes and winning his team the game by chasing a mammoth total of 187. He was awarded the Man of the Match award for the performances.

Misbah signed by Islamabad United for a price of $140,000 to be played in February 2016 for Pakistan Super League. He is the 10th highest scorer in the league. He led Islamabad United to be the first champions of Pakistan Super League, and again was captain of the Islamabad United when the team won the third edition of PSL. Misbah also enjoys the highest success percentage as captain in Pakistan Super League matches up till now. In 2019 against the Lahore Qalandars, he became the oldest player in all of t20 cricket to score a 50.

== International career ==
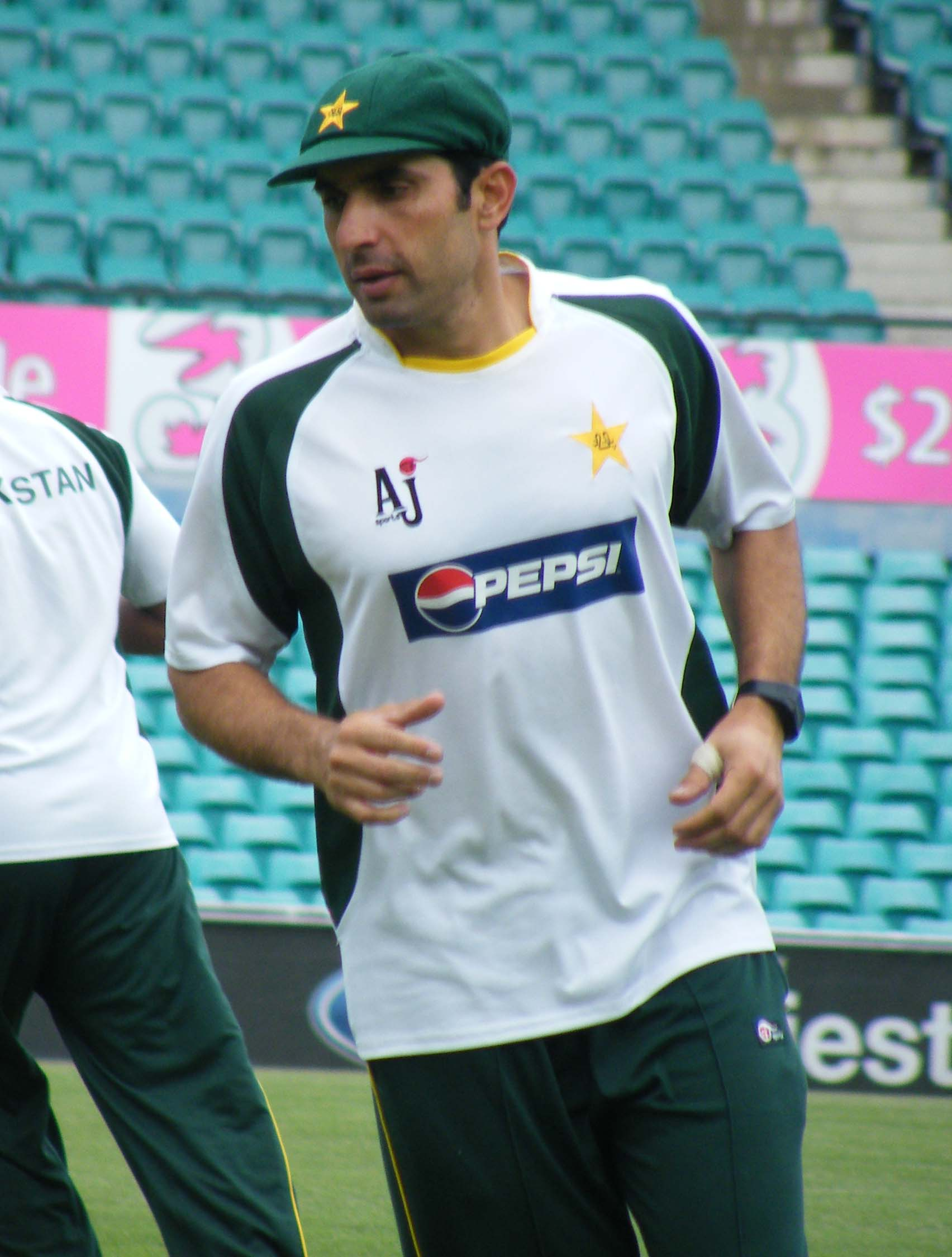
Misbah-ul-Haq in 2010

=== Early days ===
Although making his international debut back in 2001, his breakthrough came when he was selected for ICC World T20. Misbah was influential in his prolific 2007 ICC World Twenty20 famously playing the Paddle Scoop in the Final against India in the final over as Pakistan lost by 5 runs. He was leading run scorer from Pakistan and third overall in the tournament. Also he was the first Pakistani player who reached No. 1 position in ICC T20I batsmen rankings. He was also the first Pakistani player to score a 50 in T20I. His knock of 66 against Australia was named as the fourth-best T20I batting performance of the year by ESPNcricinfo voters. He was named in the 'Team of the Tournament' by ESPNcricinfo for the 2007 T20I World Cup.

His knock of 161* against India at Bengaluru was named as the third-best Test Batting Performance of the year by ESPNcricinfo voters.

For his performances in 2007, he was named in the World T20I XI by ESPNcricinfo.

Misbah was a member of the 2009 World T20 winning squad and was praised for his performance. Misbah played an influential role in getting Pakistan to the 2011 World Cup semifinals under Shahid Afridi's captaincy. After the loss against India at Mohali, Misbah faced criticism from fans and experts for playing too many dot balls in crucial overs.

=== Success ===
In 2013, Misbah was brilliant in terms of his batting. He moved to a career-best seventh place in the ICC rankings for ODI batsmen. Misbah was the leading run scorer in ODI cricket with 1373 runs for year 2013 ahead of Mohammad Hafeez and Virat Kohli. He also had 15 ODI half centuries, which is a record for most ODI half centuries in a calendar year, as well as hitting 3rd most ODI sixes that year.

Despite Pakistan losing all 3 of their games, he was named as part of the 'Team of the Tournament' in the 2013 Champions Trophy by the ICC. He was also named as captain of the Team by ESPNcricinfo.

In the first test at Abu Dhabi against South Africa, Pakistan amassed 442 runs, where Misbah scored his fourth test century, which was the second in the innings after Khurram Manzoor's 146. In the second innings the Pakistani batting collapsed and were 7/3 with only needing a mere target of 40. When the two seniors of the team (Misbah and Younis Khan) came in to bat, Misbah hit two sixes off the bowling of Robin Peterson and hit the winning runs with a straight six.

In the second test at Dubai, Pakistan were all out for 99 in the first innings. After South Africa amassed a total of 517 with Graeme Smith hitting his 4th Test double and yet another century from the AB de Villiers, Pakistan were faltering for an embarrassing defeat. At 70/4 Misbah came in and blitzed the South African bowling attack with a 197 run stand with the Asad Shafiq repeating the same stand the two had in the first test, Misbah scored 88 before trying to obliterate the part-time spinner Dean Elgar over cow corner but edged it straight to Jacques Kallis. South Africa invited Pakistan to play South Africa at home, in their third bilateral series of the year.

The first ODI was hosted at Cape Town. South Africa were bundled out for 195, losing by 23 runs, and Pakistan taking the lead, 1–0. The 2nd ODI at Port Elizabeth was rain-affected, bringing it down to 45 overs per side. Pakistan won the game by 1 run, which also led them to a maiden series win against South Africa, that too at South Africa's own home. Pakistan was also the first South Asian team to beat South Africa in a bilateral ODI series at home. In the third ODI, Ahmad Shehzad, Mohammad Hafeez, Shahid Afridi and Junaid Khan were all rested. Batting first once again, Pakistan scraped together a total of 179 all out, with Misbah remaining unbeaten on 79. Although the bowlers tried to keep Pakistan in the game, the target proved to be too low and South Africa won by 4 wickets. Pakistan took the series 2–1. This away win over the Proteas after being humiliated in Pakistan's adopted home, the UAE, brought things back to normal in Pakistan cricket, with Misbah receiving praise from across the country.

=== Breaking records ===
In 2014, he made a test century off of 56 deliveries against Australia in Abu Dhabi, equaling the fastest one of that time by Viv Richards. In July 2016, Misbah scored a century against England at Lord's and became the oldest cricketer in 82 years to score a test century. At the age of 42 years and 2 months, Misbah also became the oldest captain ever to score a test century. Misbah celebrated the landmark by saluting his team members and doing ten push-ups. He later explained during an interview that the celebration was meant as a tribute to the Military Boot Camp in Abbottabad where the team had attended an army style training session.

=== Captaincy ===
During Pakistan's tour of India, Misbah scored two centuries and was named acting captain for an ODI due to Shoaib Malik's injury.

Earlier in 2010, after the Australia tour, he was dropped from all formats of the game and later was considering retiring if the selectors continue to ignore him. He was not considered for England tour where the spot-fixing saga happened due to which Salman Butt was banned, creating a captaincy hole in the team. Then in October 2010, surprisingly he was appointed the Pakistan's Test captain for series against South Africa in UAE.

During Pakistan's tour of the West Indies, Misbah enjoyed success in the second test match at Warner Park as he went on to score his first test century in four years. After West Indies series, Misbah replaced Shahid Afridi as the limited-overs captain after PCB and coach Waqar Younis were unhappy with Afridi's captaincy and awkward public statements.

I have to give full credit to Misbah as he has stabilised the team and leads from the front. His performance is also outstanding. He makes the boys feel comfortable and relaxed so they actually enjoy their cricket. He is mature and willing to listen. The only unfortunate thing is the age factor which is not in Misbah's favour.

— Pakistan coach Waqar Younis in 2011 on Misbah's captaincy.

Misbah led the team in eight T20I matches. He won six and lost two. He played his last T20I match against England on 27 February 2012. After the defeat in Twenty20 series against England in 2012 and criticism from former cricketers, Misbah stepped down as Pakistan's Twenty20 captain and Mohammad Hafeez was named his successor to lead the team in Twenty20.

In 2013, Pakistan played bilateral series against South Africa, India, West Indies, Zimbabwe and Sri Lanka and they also participated in Champions Trophy. Despite winning against India in India, away series lose against South Africa 3–2, win-less streak in Champions Trophy and winning against minnow Zimbabwe 2–1 and then again defeat in home series against South Africa in UAE 4–1 put huge criticism on Misbah's captaincy and his approach to the game. Especially series defeat against South Africa 4–1, brought Misbah's captaincy under severe scrutiny. Ex-Pakistani players were demanding a total renovation of Pakistan cricket, and Misbah was being criticized for his captaincy, slow batting and the defeat. The PCB, however, announced that Misbah was to remain captain until the 2015 Cricket World Cup. Several TV shows and notable personalities opposed this decision and demanded that Misbah should be sacked.

In August 2016, under Misbah's captaincy, Pakistan achieved the number 1 ranking in test cricket for the first time since 1988. Pakistan displaced India as number 1 after rain caused the final test match between India and West Indies to end in a draw. PCB chairman Shahryar Khan and ex-Pakistan coach Waqar Younis said that all credit should be given to Misbah for his leadership over the last six years.

Misbah is the most successful test captain of Pakistan. Misbah has led Pakistan in 56 test matches, winning 26, losing 19 with 11 draws. Misbah was the first captain becoming the first Pakistani to play 50 matches as Test captain. Misbah was named test captain after spot-fixing scandal during England tour of 2010. In subsequent series against South Africa in the UAE he led Pakistan in tests. After resignation of Shahid Afridi as test captain and suspension of Salman Butt due to spot-fixing scandal, Misbah was preferred over Younus Khan, Mohammad Yousuf and Kamran Akmal as captain. Wasim Akram stated that although the decision was surprising if Misbah bats and fields well everything else will go according to plan. Former Pakistan coach Geoff Lawson stated that he believed Misbah has the best cricketing brain within Pakistan and he will do incredibly well in the plans for the captaincy Misbah hit back at those who criticised the decision to appoint him captain and stated that he should be given a chance to prove himself

Misbah was the ODI captain from 2008 to 2015 and had the 10th highest success rate. He left in 2015 as captain from criticism due to his slow yet successful approach. However, after continuous international losses, notably Pakistan's exit from the 2016 ICC World Twenty20, PCB officials seriously considered asking him to return as ODI captain.

=== Retirement ===
In January 2015, Misbah announced that he would retire from ODIs and T20Is after the 2015 World Cup. Misbah captained Pakistan in the 2015 Cricket World Cup at Australia. He was the leading run scorer in the tournament from Pakistan. Pakistan could only make it to the Quarter-Finals. They were defeated by Australia in the Quarter-Final, which was the last ODI match for Misbah.

In April 2015, Misbah decided to postpone his Test retirement until Australia tour in 2016/17. On 31 October, Misbah ul-Haq ended his PSL career but soon took back his PSL retirement.

In November 2016, against New Zealand at Christchurch, Misbah-ul-Haq was handed over a one-match suspension by the ICC for his team's slow over rate, meaning he had to miss the second Test in Hamilton. On 30 December 2016, ESPNcricinfo published an article which indicated that Misbah might retire.

However, he continued to play in longer format for rest of the series with success, where Pakistan beat England to become No. 1 Test team in the world as well. On 6 April 2017, Misbah finally announced his intentions to retire from all international cricket after the conclusion of West Indies tour.

He played his last international match on 10 May 2017, against West Indies in Roseau. He scored his 39th Test fifty in the first innings, but dismissed for just 2 runs in the second innings. However, in his last match as captain, Pakistan won the match by 101 runs and sealed the series 2–1. The win highlighted as the first ever series win against West Indies in the West Indies as well.

== Playing style ==
A 2007 profile described Misbah-ul-Haq as an "orthodox-unorthodox" batter: alongside classical strokes he deployed unusual methods, most famously a straight drive off one knee, and a reverse-sweep to reach fifty, while relying on deft nudges and tickles in limited-overs play. On a testing pitch he coped comfortably with Zaheer Khan's swing, Munaf Patel's seam and reverse, and Harbhajan Singh's persistence, and even countered Anil Kumble by moving his front (left) foot outside leg stump to take lbw out of the equation; the piece cast his problem-solving technique as central to his late-career resurgence.

== Post-retirement ==
=== Coaching career ===
On 4 September 2019, Misbah was appointed as the head coach for Pakistan cricket team as well as chief selector on a 3-year contract. This is the first time someone had simultaneously held both positions in Pakistan cricket. This started well for Misbah who won the One day international series 2–0. But then in the T20 series Sri Lanka pulled off a shock result and whitewashed Pakistan. Afterwards he led the team in Australia where they lost the test series 2–0.

In October 2020, he resigned as chief selector of Pakistan national cricket team. His first tour as just the head coach came against New Zealand where Pakistan were beaten 2–0. After this he led Pakistan to their first Test series win against South Africa since 2003.

On 6 September 2021, Misbah resigned as the head coach of Pakistan.

In July 2022, he become the head coach of Muzaffarabad Tigers in Kashmir Premier League (KPL) season 2.

As of 2024 Misbah-ul-Haq is part of PCB cricket technical committee alongside Junaid Zia and Usman Tasleem.

=== Philanthropy ===
After his retirement from cricket he became what he calls a 'full time' philanthropist by becoming the director of the Pakistan Children's Heart Foundation (PCHF), an organization which provides financial assistance to children with congenital heart defect (CHD), as of 2019 helping to do some 1500 surgeries.

== Records and achievements ==
- Holds the record for scoring the most runs in ODI cricket without a career hundred (5,122).
- Leading run scorer in ODIs during 2013.
- Pakistan's most successful Test captain with 26 wins.
- The first batsman to make a Test hundred after the age of 41 since Geoffrey Boycott in 1981.
- One of 2017 Wisden Cricketers of the Year.

== Awards and recognition ==
- Pride of Performance – President of Pakistan Mamnoon Hussain awarded Pride of Performance to Misbah-ul-Haq on 23 March 2014.
- ICC Spirit of Cricket – 2016
- PCB's Imtiaz Ahmed Spirit of Cricket Award and Lifetime Achievement Award – 2017.
- Sitara-i-Imtiaz - President of Pakistan Mamnoon Hussain awarded Sitara-i-Imtiaz to Misbah-ul-Haq on 23 March 2018.

Preceded by Salman Butt	Pakistani national cricket captain (Tests); 2010–2017	Succeeded by Sarfraz Ahmed
Preceded by Shahid Afridi	Pakistani national cricket captain (ODIs); 2011–2015	Succeeded by Azhar Ali
Preceded by Shahid Afridi	Pakistani national cricket captain (T20I); 2011–2012	Succeeded by Mohammad Hafeez
