= Muhammad Musa =

Pakistani cricketer

Personal information
- Full name: Muhammad Musa Khan
- Born: 28 August 2000 (age 26); Islamabad, Pakistan
- Nickname: Raftaar
- Height: 5 ft 9 in (175 cm)
- Batting: Right handed
- Bowling: Right-arm fast-medium
- Role: Bowler

International information
- National side: Pakistan (2019–2020)
- Only Test (cap 238): 29 November 2019 v Australia
- ODI debut (cap 227): 1 November 2020 v Zimbabwe
- Last ODI: 3 November 2020 v Zimbabwe
- T20I debut (cap 84): 8 November 2019 v Australia
- Last T20I: 10 November 2020 v Zimbabwe

Domestic team information
- Years: Team
- 2018: Islamabad United
- 2019–present: Northern
- 2019–present: Chattogram Challengers

Career statistics
Competition	Test	ODI	T20I	FC
Matches	1	2	2	30
Runs scored	16	9	–	219
Batting average	–	–	–	9.52
100s/50s	0/0	0/0	–	0/0
Top score	12*	9*	–	27*
Balls bowled	120	97	47	4,194
Wickets	0	2	0	98
Bowling average	–	50.50	–	27.25
5 wickets in innings	–	0	–	6
10 wickets in match	–	0	–	2
Best bowling	–	2/21	–	7/28
Catches/stumpings	0/–	0/–	0/–	8/–
- Source: Cricinfo, 5 January 2024

Muhammad Musa Khan (Khowar: محمد موسی خان, Urdu: محمد موسی خان; born 28 August 2000) is a Pakistani cricketer. He made his international debut for the Pakistan cricket team against Australia in November 2019.

== Early career ==
Musa was born in Islamabad. His family is originally from Chitral.

He started his cricketing journey at the age of 16 in 2016 when he joined the Islamabad Gymkhana Cricket Club, before playing at Under-19 level. After performing in Regional U19s he would eventually play for the National U19 squad in the 2017 ACC Under-19 Asia Cup in November 2017 and, later, in the 2018 Under-19 Cricket World Cup in January and February 2018.

== Domestic career ==
He made his List A debut for Sui Northern Gas Pipelines Limited in the 2018–19 Quaid-e-Azam One Day Cup on 16 October 2018. Prior to his List A debut, he was named in Pakistan's squad for the 2018 Under-19 Cricket World Cup. He made his first-class debut for Sui Northern Gas Pipelines Limited in the 2018–19 Quaid-e-Azam Trophy on 7 November 2018.

He made his Twenty20 debut for Islamabad United in the 2019 Pakistan Super League on 22 February 2019. During the tournament, the "tall, broad-shouldered young man with green eyes and an eye-catching hairstyle" was noted for his pace (in the high 140s) but a lack of accuracy.

Playing for Islamabad in the 2024–25 Quaid-e-Azam Trophy, he took 38 wickets in five matches at an average of 9.82, and was named bowler of the tournament. In the match against Hyderabad he took 5 for 32 and 7 for 28.

== International career ==
In December 2018, he was named in Pakistan's team for the 2018 ACC Emerging Teams Asia Cup. In October 2019, he was named in Pakistan's Test and Twenty20 International (T20I) squads for their series against Australia. He made his T20I debut for Pakistan, against Australia, on 8 November 2019. He made his Test debut for Pakistan, also against Australia, on 29 November 2019.

In June 2020, he was named as one of four reserve players for Pakistan's tour to England during the COVID-19 pandemic. In October 2020, he was named in a 22-man squad of "probables" for Pakistan's home series against Zimbabwe. On 29 October 2020, he was named in Pakistan's One Day International (ODI) squad for the first match against Zimbabwe. He made his ODI debut for Pakistan, against Zimbabwe, on 1 November 2020.
