= Dawood Industries cricket team =

Cricket team

Dawood Industries were a Pakistani first-class cricket team sponsored by the Dawood group of companies. They had one season of first-class cricket in the Patron's Trophy in 1975–76.

Dawood Industries, which included the Test players Zaheer Abbas (who captained the team) and Imran Khan, won their matches in the first three rounds, then lost by an innings to Pakistan International Airlines in the semi-final. Their four matches took place between 12 October and 3 November 1975.

Fourteen players appeared for Dawood Industries in the four matches. The highest scorer was Zaheer Abbas, with 359 runs at an average of 51.28. The leading bowler was Mohammad Sabir, who took 25 wickets at 20.32.

== Other sources ==
- Wisden Cricketers' Almanack 1977
