= Mohammad Sabir (Pakistani cricketer) =

Pakistani cricketer

Personal information
- Full name: Mohammad Sabir Hussain
- Born: 1 September 1943; Patiala, British India
- Died: 17 June 1998 (aged 54); Sukho, Pakistan
- Batting: Right-handed
- Bowling: Right-arm leg-spin

Domestic team information
- Years: Team
- 1962-63 to 1986-87: Rawalpindi
- 1971-72 to 1975-76: Punjab

Career statistics
| Competition | FC | List A |
|---|---|---|
| Matches | 57 | 1 |
| Runs scored | 372 | – |
| Batting average | 7.59 | – |
| 100s/50s | 0/0 | – |
| Top score | 32* | – |
| Balls bowled | 11,925 | 56 |
| Wickets | 248 | 3 |
| Bowling average | 22.12 | 6.66 |
| 5 wickets in innings | 18 | 0 |
| 10 wickets in match | 6 | n/a |
| Best bowling | 7/61 | 3/20 |
| Catches/stumpings | 18/– | 1/– |
- Source: ESPNcricinfo, 31 January 2019

Mohammad Sabir (1 September 1943 – 17 June 1998) was a Pakistani cricketer who played first-class cricket from 1962 to 1986.

Mohammad Sabir was a leg-spin and googly bowler. He achieved his best innings and match figures in his first season when he took 7 for 61, and 13 for 99 in the match, for Rawalpindi against Karachi B in a semi-final of the Quaid-e-Azam Trophy in 1962–63. Other notable performances included 11 for 80 (7 for 62 and 4 for 18) against Bahawalpur in 1971–72, and 10 for 68 (4 for 47 and 6 for 21) for Dawood Industries against Lahore A in 1975–76.

His first captain, the Test player Maqsood Ahmed, believed Sabir was comparable to Richie Benaud. However, his fiery temperament made the selectors wary of him and despite his continued success at domestic level he did not play for Pakistan.
