= Faham-ul-Haq =

Pakistani cricketer (born 2005)

Personal information
- Full name: Faham-ul-Haq Khan Niazi
- Born: 2 December 2005 (age 20); Lahore, Pakistan
- Batting: Left-handed
- Bowling: Right arm medium fast
- Role: All-rounder

Faham-ul-Haq Khan Niazi (born 2 December 2005) is a Pakistani cricketer. He is a left-handed batter and right arm medium fast bowler and plays as an all-rounder. He plays domestically for Faisalabad and has also represented the Pakistan national under-19 cricket team.

== Career ==
After making his List-A cricket debut in 2024 for the Higher Education Commission cricket team, he was selected to play for Pakistan U19 in November 2024. He claimed 3-18 against Afghanistan U19 and 2-41 against India U19 in the 2024 U19 Asia Cup.

In January 2025, he made his first-class cricket debut in the President's Trophy, playing for Higher Education Commission. After signing for Faisalabad for the 2025–26 Quaid-e-Azam Trophy, he took 3-59 in the first innings on debut against Karachi Blues. He went on to score his maiden first-class half century opening the batting in October 2025 against Sialkot cricket team. On 31 October, he scored his maiden first-class century for Faisalabad in Rawalpindi, against Peshawar in the Quaid-e-Azam Trophy. A further century followed and he finished the tournament with 556 runs at an average of 45.98. Playing for Sahir Associates in the 2025–26 President's Cup, he continued his form, scoring his maiden List-A century against Pakistan Television. He also claimed career best bowling figures of 4-30 against WAPDA.

== Personal life ==
He is the son of former Pakistan cricket captain Misbah-ul-Haq. He played against his father in 2022 in the T10 Mega Stars League launched by Shahid Afridi.
