= Shoaib Nasir =

Pakistani cricketer (born 1983)

Personal information
- Born: 26 February 1983 (age 43); Rawalpindi, Pakistan
- Source: ESPNcricinfo, 1 October 2016

Shoaib Nasir (born 26 February 1983) is a Pakistani first-class cricketer who plays for Rawalpindi and Bowdon Vale Cricket Club in Bowdon, England. He is a left-handed batter and right-handed spin bowler. He has a top score of 177.
