= Azad Jammu and Kashmir cricket team =

Pakistani cricket team

The Azad Jammu and Kashmir cricket team is a Pakistani cricket team based in Azad Kashmir, Pakistan. Beginning with the 2024–25 season, it participates in Pakistan's first-class, List A and Twenty20 competitions.

Captained by Hasan Raza, Azad Jammu & Kashmir played Bahawalpur in their inaugural first-class match in the 2024–25 Quaid-e-Azam Trophy, losing by three wickets. Raza made the team's first century, top-scoring with 105 in the first innings. Taj Wali took the team's first five-wicket haul, with 5 for 41 in the first innings; Faizan Saleem, on his first-class debut, took 2 for 49 and 6 for 63.
