= Mohammad Sajid =

Pakistani cricketer

Personal information
- Full name: Mohammad Sajid
- Source: Cricinfo, 3 October 2017

Mohammad Sajid is a Pakistani former cricketer. A medium-fast bowler, he played in one List A match in 2001/02. He is now an umpire, and stood in the match between Rawalpindi and Habib Bank Limited in the 2017–18 Quaid-e-Azam Trophy on 3 October 2017.
