= Tariq Rasheed =

Pakistani cricketer (born 1978)

Personal information
- Full name: Tariq Rasheed Sheikh
- Born: 10 March 1978 (age 48); Lahore, Punjab, Pakistan
- Batting: Right-handed
- Bowling: Right-arm off-break
- Role: Umpire

Umpiring information
- T20Is umpired: 4 (2024)
- WODIs umpired: 3 (2023–2025)
- WT20Is umpired: 6 (2019–2024)
- Source: Cricinfo, 26 September 2017

Tariq Rasheed (born 10 March 1978) is a Pakistani former first-class cricketer. He played in 20 first-class and 22 List A matches between 1996 and 2004. He is now an umpire, and stood in the match between Federally Administered Tribal Areas and Habib Bank Limited in the 2017–18 Quaid-e-Azam Trophy on 26 September 2017.

== See also ==
- List of Twenty20 International cricket umpires
