= Larkana cricket team =

Cricket team

The Larkana cricket team is a Pakistani cricket team based in the city of Larkana, in the Sindh province. Beginning with the 2024–25 season, it participates in Pakistan's first-class, List A and Twenty20 competitions.

Captained by Mohsin Raza, who was one of several Larkana players making their first-class debut, Larkana played Hyderabad in their inaugural first-class match in the 2024–25 Quaid-e-Azam Trophy, losing by 119 runs. Akbar-ur-Rehman made the team's maiden first-class fifty, top-scoring in each innings with 48 and 67. The Test leg-spin bowler Zahid Mahmood took over the captaincy after the first match. In the fourth match, the opening batsman Umar Waheed scored Larkana's first century, with 105 against Faisalabad.
