= Abbottabad Cricket Stadium =

Cricket ground in Khyber Pakhtunkhwa, Pakistan

Coordinates: 34.156278°N 73.261557°E

- Khadda Stadium
- Interactive map of Abbottabad Cricket Stadium
- Location: Abbottabad, Khyber Pakhtunkhwa, Pakistan
- Country: Pakistan
- Establishment: 2003; 23 years ago
- Capacity: 4,000
- Owner: Pakistan Cricket Board
- Operator: Abbottabad Cricket Association
- Tenants: Abbottabad; Khyber Pakhtunkhwa cricket team Pakistan national cricket team

The Abbottabad Cricket Stadium is a cricket ground located in Abbottabad, Khyber Pakhtunkhwa, Pakistan. It was established in 2003 by the Pakistan Cricket Board, and was declared a first-class cricket venue in 2010.

It has hosted first-class and List A games for both Khyber Pakhtunkhwa cricket team and Federally Administered Tribal Areas, as well as training camps for the Pakistan national team. In September 2019, the Pakistan Cricket Board named it as one of the venues in the 2019–20 Quaid-e-Azam Trophy.

== Potential ==
The stadium is located in the backdrop of mountains at an altitude of over 1,200 metres (4,000 ft). Commenting on his maiden visit to the venue, Wasim Akram remarked that "it’s probably the most beautiful stadium in the world. I really feel proud that we have such stadiums in Pakistan. I have travelled all around the world and I’m pleased to see such a venue in our country".

Ruing PCB's lack of interest, Abbottabad Cricket Association President Amir Nawab has said, “The PCB should invest here...this ground can catch the eye of the outside world but investment is needed.”

The ground was chosen as the location for the training camp for the Pakistan cricket team prior to the ICC Champions Trophy 2013, since the conditions were similar to those in England and Wales.

== Matches ==
As of September 2022, 53 first-class matches have been played on this ground, all of them either Quaid-e-Azam Trophy or Quaid-e-Azam Trophy Silver League fixtures. Moreover, 14 List A games have also been played here.

== See also ==
- Abbottabad Falcons
- Pakistan Cricket Board
