= Abdul Faseeh =

Pakistani cricketer (born 2003)

Personal information
- Born: 2 August 2003 (age 23); Rawalpindi, Punjab, Pakistan
- Role: Batsman

Domestic team information
- Years: Team
- 2020/21–present: Northern
- 2023-present: Rawalpindi cricket team (squad no. 115)
- Source: ESPNcricinfo, 17 November 2021

Abdul Faseeh (born 2 August 2003) is a Pakistani cricketer. He made his first-class debut on 17 November 2021, for Northern in the 2021–22 Quaid-e-Azam Trophy. He was the leading run scorer of President Trophy Grade I 2024, scoring 637 runs in 12 innings at an average of 53. He scored 3 centuries and a half century, with 156 being his highest individual score. In December 2021, he was named in Pakistan's team for the 2022 ICC Under-19 Cricket World Cup in the West Indies.
