= Mohammad Sarwar (cricketer) =

Pakistani cricketer (born 1995)

Personal information
- Full name: Mohammad Sarwar Afridi
- Born: 20 January 1995 (age 31); Peshawar, Khyber Pakhtunkhwa, Pakistan
- Role: Batting all-rounder

Domestic team information
- Years: Team
- 2023: Multan Sultans (squad no. 99)
- Source: Cricinfo, 18 December 2015

Mohammad Sarwar Afridi (born 20 January 1995) is a Pakistani cricketer who plays for Khyber Pakhtunkhwa. He made his first-class debut for FATA on 26 October 2015 in the 2015–16 Quaid-e-Azam Trophy. He made his List A debut for Federally Administered Tribal Areas in the 2017–18 Regional One Day Cup on 4 February 2018.
