= Shoaib Akhtar Cricket Stadium =

Cricket ground in Rawalpindi, Pakistan

- شعیب اختر سٹیڈیم
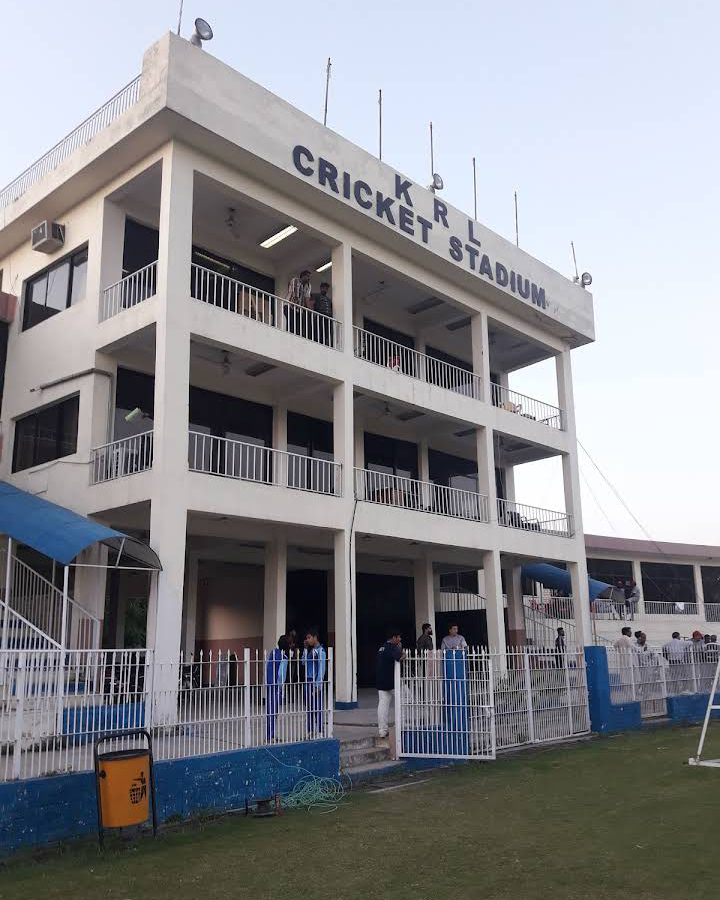
- Interactive map of Shoaib Akhtar Cricket Stadium
- Former names: KRL Cricket Stadium
- Location: KRL Road, Rawalpindi, Punjab, Pakistan
- Coordinates: 33.61895893598604°N 73.10558050908493°E
- Owner: Khan Research Laboratories

Tenants
- Khan Research Laboratories cricket team Pakistan national cricket team

The Shoaib Akhtar Cricket Stadium, formerly known as the Khan Research Laboratories Cricket Stadium, is a cricket ground in Rawalpindi, Punjab, Pakistan. It has hosted domestic first-class and limited-overs cricket and has served as a home ground of the Khan Research Laboratories cricket team. The venue is distinct from the KRL Football Stadium.

At first named after Pakistan's nuclear enrichment facility Khan Research Laboratories, it was renamed Shoaib Akhtar Stadium in honour of the tearaway Pakistani fast bowler in March 2021.

== History ==
Recorded matches at the ground were held since the 1987–88 season, and it was named as Khan Research Laboratories Ground and Dr AQ Khan Ground. By January 1992, it was being used for representative cricket, including a match between Islamabad Under-19s and England Under-19s.

The venue subsequently staged first-class and List A fixtures involving departmental and regional teams.

The ground continued to be used for major domestic cricket during the 2000s and 2010s. It hosted Patron's Cup cricket in February 2006, and was among the venues for the 2019–20 Quaid-e-Azam Trophy. Matches were also transferred there during the 2020 National Under-19 Tournament after weather disrupted the Lahore programme.

The name was changed to Shoaib Akhtar Stadium in March 2021. It remained a Quaid-e-Azam Trophy venue in the 2025–26 season.

== See also ==
- List of cricket grounds in Pakistan
- KRL Football Stadium
