= Rehan Afridi =

Pakistani cricketer (born 1992)

Personal information
- Born: 10 May 1992 (age 34); Khyber Agency, Pakistan
- Batting: Right-handed
- Role: Wicket-keeper

Career statistics
Competition	FC	LA	T20
Matches	81	31	18
Runs scored	3791	589	279
Batting average	30.82	24.54	19.92
100s/50s	7/17	0/2	0/1
Top score	164	80	54
Balls bowled	12	–	–
Wickets	0	–	–
Bowling average	–	–	–
5 wickets in innings	–	–	–
10 wickets in match	–	–	–
Best bowling	–	–	–
Catches/stumpings	207/21	24/14	4/4
- Source: Cricinfo, 19 October 2023

Rehan Afridi (born 10 May 1992) is a Pakistani cricketer who plays for Khyber Pakhtunkhwa. In September 2019, he was named in Khyber Pakhtunkhwa's squad for the 2019–20 Quaid-e-Azam Trophy tournament. In January 2021, following the final of the 2020–21 Quaid-e-Azam Trophy finished in a tie, he was named as the Best Wicket-keeper of the tournament. Later the same month, he was named in Khyber Pakhtunkhwa's squad for the 2020–21 Pakistan Cup.
