= Hasan Raza (Khyber Pakhtunkhwa cricketer) =

Pakistani cricketer (born 1995)

Personal information
- Born: 6 January 1995 (age 31); Mirpur, Khyber Pakhtunkhwa, Pakistan
- Batting: Left-handed
- Bowling: Right-arm medium fast
- Source: ESPNcricinfo

Hasan Raza (born 6 January 1995) is a Pakistani first-class cricketer who plays for Habib Bank Limited.
