= Rawalpindi cricket team =

Pakistani first-class cricket team

Personnel
- Captain: Shadab Khan
- Coach: Samiullah Khan

Team information
- Founded: 1958; 68 years ago
- Home ground: Rawalpindi Cricket Stadium

Rawalpindi cricket team is a first-class cricket team that represents Rawalpindi, Punjab. The team's home ground is Rawalpindi Cricket Stadium, Rawalpindi. They participate in the Quaid-e-Azam Trophy. They were refounded in the 2023/24 season after a revamp of the domestic structure.

== Playing record ==
=== 1950s and 1960s ===
Rawalpindi played their first two matches in 1958–59 in the Quaid-i-Azam Trophy, drawing the first and winning the second against Peshawar. Munir Malik took 21 wickets in the two matches for 136 runs; on top of his 12 for 39 against Peshawar he scored 35 not out, which was the highest score in the match, a crucial element of the 28-run victory.

In 1961-62 Rawalpindi won three of their four matches in the Quaid-i-Azam Trophy, Munir Malik taking 31 wickets at 12.93 and Javed Akhtar 22 at 10.77. Malik took 12 for 84 in the match against Peshawar, while Akhtar took 12 for 117 against Combined Services.

In 1962-63 Rawalpindi reached the semi-finals of the Quaid-i-Azam Trophy, thanks largely to the bowling of the captain, Maqsood Ahmed, who took 34 wickets in the four matches at 9.29 (including 13 for 83 against Sargodha), and Mohammad Sabir, 28 at 11.42. Rawalpindi also reached the semi-finals in 1963–64.

In 1967-68 Rawalpindi reached the final of a competition for the first time, this time in the Ayub Trophy, losing by 10 wickets to Karachi Blues. Again the bowling was the team's strength. No batsman scored a century, but Javed Akhtar led the bowling with 24 wickets at 13.08 in the four matches.

=== 1970s and 1980s ===
The six-team Punjab Governor's Gold Cup Tournament was held only once, in 1971–72, and Rawalpindi reached the final, losing to Punjab University. After a few years playing in other tournaments Rawalpindi returned to the Quaid-i-Azam Trophy in 1979–80, then took part in the expanded BCCP Patron's Trophy in 1983–84. They reached the semi-finals in 1983–84, when Mohammad Riaz took 13 for 59 in one of the preliminary matches against Lahore Division.

In 1980–81, they won the Patron's Trophy, winning all five of their group matches, receiving a walkover in their semi-final, and beating Karachi Blues in the final by eight wickets. However, the matches were later downgraded in status and are no longer considered to have been first-class.

The Patron's Trophy returned to first-class status in 1983–84. In 1984–85, Rawalpindi were beaten in the final by Karachi Whites. They reached the semi-finals in 1986–87. In 1988–89, after winning four of their seven matches, they played off in the final against Karachi, losing by 191 runs. Their leading player was Raja Sarfraz, who took 35 wickets at 16.45, including 12 for 120 against Multan.

=== 1990s and 2000s ===
Rawalpindi reached the semi-finals of the Quaid-i-Azam Trophy in 1991-92 and 1993–94. In 1998-99 they drew a match against the touring Australians, Shakeel Ahmed taking 10 wickets and Naved Ashraf scoring 48 and 115 not out. They again reached the semi-finals of the Quaid-i-Azam Trophy in 2002–03, and continued thereafter to have reasonable success, without reaching the finals. In 2004-05 Bazid Khan, in one of the seven matches he played for Rawalpindi, hit Rawalpindi's highest-ever score, 300 not out, against Hyderabad. In 2009-10 Rashid Latif took 9 for 42 against Islamabad, which remained the Rawalpindi record for only two years.

=== 2010s ===
In 2010–11, Rawalpindi finished third in Division One of the Quaid-i-Azam Trophy, with six wins from their 11 matches. Sadaf Hussain took 64 wickets at 16.12, including five or more wickets in an innings eight times, with match figures of 11 for 118 against Zarai Taraqiati Bank and 11 for 104 against Faisalabad. In 2011–12, they slipped to seventh, with four wins from 11 matches. Hussain was again the outstanding player, with 53 wickets at 20.37. He set two bowling records for Rawalpindi in the match against Habib Bank Limited when he took 9 for 37 in the first innings and 15 for 154 in the match. Habib Bank Limited nevertheless won by 131 runs. In 2012–13, Rawalpindi finished at the top of Group II, and were promoted into Group I for the 2013–14 season.

=== 2013-14 ===
Led by Babar Naeem, who captained the team for several seasons, Rawalpindi began the 2013–14 Quaid-i-Azam Trophy by defeating Bahawalpur by an innings and 130 runs. They then beat Abbottabad by eight wickets, drew with Peshawar, beat Sialkot by four wickets, and drew with Lahore Ravi. In their next match they thrashed Karachi Blues by an innings and 140 runs, dismissing them for 51 in the second innings; Nasir Malik took 5 for 108 and 6 for 17.

Progressing into Super Eight Group B, Rawalpindi drew against Lahore Shalimar, beat Sialkot again, this time by nine wickets, and drew against Multan, finishing at 345 for 9 in pursuit of 430 to win. As they were the only team in their group to win a match, they progressed to the final.

At the Gaddafi Stadium in Lahore, Islamabad won the toss and sent Rawalpindi in, dismissing them early on the second day for 211. A seventh-wicket partnership of 139 between Awais Zia and Zahid Mansoor produced the bulk of Rawalpindi's runs. Rawalpindi then dismissed Islamabad for 175 just before stumps on the second day, Nasir Malik taking four wickets. The opener Shoaib Nasir dominated the Rawalpindi second innings, scoring 177, his highest score in first-class cricket, off 296 balls. He and Babar Naeem added 159 for the fourth wicket off 39 overs. When Rawalpindi were all out for 398, Islamabad needed 435 to win in just under a day and a half, but they lost a wicket in the first over and continued to lose wickets regularly until they were all out for 206, giving Rawalpindi victory by 228 runs. Akhtar Ayub took 5 for 67, giving him eight wickets for the match. Shoaib Nasir won the player of the match award.

Rawalpindi's first-class playing record, excluding the divided teams above, was 355 matches, 126 wins, 103 losses and 126 draws. Rawalpindi's List A and Twenty20 sides were known as the Rawalpindi Rams.

=== Refounding ===
In 2023, the Rawalpindi cricket team was refounded as part of the restructuring of the Pakistani domestic system and resumed its place in the Quaid-e-Azam Trophy.

- 2023–24: 7 matches, 1 win, 3 losses, 3 draws, finished seventh of eight
- 2024–25: 5 matches, 2 wins, 1 loss, 2 draws, finished second of the six teams in Group B

== Current Squad ==
Players with international caps are listed in bold. List of players to have played for the First XI in First Class Cricket in the 2023-24 Season

Name	Birth date	Batting style	Bowling style	Notes
Batsmen				
Abdul Faseeh	2 August 2003 (age 20)	Left-handed		
Aqib Shah	15 October 1995 (age 28)	Left-handed		
Mohammad Zeeshan	15 April 2006 (age 18)	Right-handed	Right-arm medium-fast	
**Haider Ali**	2 October 2000 (age 23)	Right-handed		
Hasan Raza	6 January 1995 (age 28)	Left-handed	Right-arm medium-fast	
Mohammad Wasim Jr.	25 August 2001 (age 23)	Right-handed	Right-arm medium	
Umar Waheed	26 April 1994 (age 29)	Right-handed	Right-arm medium	
Zeeshan Malik	26 December 1996 (age 26)	Right-handed	Right-arm off spin	
All-Rounders
**Mubasir Khan**	24 April 2002 (age 21)	Right-handed	Right-arm off spin	
Wicket-keepers
Hunain Shah	4 February 2004 (age 21)	Right-handed		
Taimur Khan	28 January 1996 (age 27)	Right-handed		
Umair Masood	7 December 1997 (age 25)	Right-handed		
Spin Bowlers
Mehran Mumtaz	7 April 2003 (age 20)	Left-handed	Slow left-arm orthodox	
Pace Bowlers
Zaman Khan	10 September 2001 (age 23)	Right-handed	Right-arm medium-fast	
Jahandad Khan	16 June 2003 (age 21)	Right-handed	Left-arm medium-fast	
Mohammad Awais Anwar	27 November 2003 (age 19)	Right-handed	Right-arm medium	
Mohammad Faizan	10 July 2002 (age 21)	Left-handed	Left-arm fast medium	
Kashif Ali	4 October 2002 (age 21)	Right-handed	Right-arm medium	
Munir Riaz	2 November 2001 (age 21)	Right-handed	Right-arm medium-fast	
Shiraz Khan	25 December 2000 (age 22)	Right-handed	Right-arm medium-fast	

== Other sources ==
- Wisden Cricketers' Almanack 1960 to present
