= Federally Administered Tribal Areas cricket team =

Cricket team in Pakistan

Federally Administered Tribal Areas
Personnel
- Captain: Salman Ali Agha
- Coach: Riaz Afridi
- Owner: Pakistan Cricket Board

Team information
- Founded: 2023; 2 years ago (refounded)
- Home ground: Jinnah Stadium, Sialkot, Pakistan

The Federally Administered Tribal Areas cricket team (FATA) is a first-class cricket side represents Federally Administered Tribal Areas (FATA) of Pakistan. They first competed domestic cricket in Pakistan in the 2015–16 season. FATA entered the Quaid-e-Azam Trophy through a qualifying round. In their first ever first-class match, they drew with Habib Bank Limited cricket team in the 2015–16 Quaid-e-Azam Trophy. They won their first match in round 6 of the same edition of the tournament, when they defeated Rawalpindi by four wickets.

In August 2016 they took part in Pakistan's domestic Twenty20 cricket tournament, the 2016–17 National T20 Cup. In their first match, they beat Rawalpindi by 15 runs. In November 2017, they reached the semi-finals of the 2017–18 National T20 Cup, but lost to Lahore Blues by 10 runs.

== Current squad ==
The following played for the First XI in First Class Cricket in the 2023-24 season. Players with international caps are listed in bold.

Name	Birth date	Batting style	Bowling style	Notes
Batsmen
Azaz Khan	24 February 1999 (age 24)	Right-handed	Right-arm off spin	
Haseeb Khan	21 April 2004 (age 19)	Right-handed	Right-arm leg spin	
**Khushdil Shah**	7 February 1995 (age 28)	Left-handed	Slow left-arm orthodox	
Mohammad Farooq	4 March 2004 (age 19)	Right-handed		
Nisar Afridi	20 October 1999 (age 24)	Left-handed	Right-arm off spin	
Mohammad Usman	2 January 1994 (age 29)	Right-handed		
Mohammad Wasim Khan	25 October 1997 (age 25)	Left-handed		
Sahil Yousaf	10 October 1999 (age 24)	Right-handed	Right-arm leg spin	
Samiullah	25 March 2004 (age 19)	Right-handed	Right-arm medium	
All-Rounders
Asif Afridi	25 December 1986 (age 36)	Left-handed	Slow left-arm orthodox	
Asif Ali	13 April 1989 (age 34)	Left-handed	Slow left-arm orthodox	
Kashif Noor	10 October 2002 (age 21)	Right-handed	Right-arm off spin	
Mohammad Sarwar	20 January 1995 (age 28)	Right-handed	Right-arm fast-medium	
Wicket-keepers
Rehan Afridi	10 May 1992 (age 31)	Right-handed		
Salman Khan	15 January 2001 (age 22)	Right-handed	Right-arm leg spin	
Spin Bowlers
Mohammad Irfan Khan	1 August 1989 (age 34)	Right-handed	Right-arm leg spin	
Pace Bowlers
Aimal Khan	17 October 2004 (age 19)	Right-handed	Right-arm medium	
Akif Javed	10 October 2000 (age 23)	Right-handed	Left-arm medium-fast	
Arshadullah	5 February 1999 (age 24)	Left-handed	Left-arm medium	
Irfanullah Shah	5 May 1995 (age 28)	Right-handed	Right-arm medium-fast	
Sameen Gul	4 February 1999 (age 24	Right-handed	Right-arm medium	
Shahid Aziz	23 March 2003 (age 20)	Right-handed	Right-arm medium	
Zeeshan Ahmed	1 January 2000 (age 23)			
