= 2023–24 Quaid-e-Azam Trophy =

Pakistani cricket competition

- Dates: 10 September 2023 – 26 October 2023
- Administrator(s): Pakistan Cricket Board
- Cricket format: First-class
- Tournament format(s): round-robin group stage and final
- Host(s): Pakistan
- Champions: Karachi Whites (5th title)
- Runners-up: Faisalabad
- Participants: 8
- Matches: 29
- Most runs: Sahibzada Farhan (847)
- Most wickets: Khurram Shahzad (36)
- Official website: www.pcb.com.pk

The 2023–24 Quaid-e-Azam Trophy was a first-class domestic cricket competition that was held in Pakistan during the 2023–24 season. It was the 66th edition of the Quaid-e-Azam Trophy, and it was contested by eight teams representing regional cricket associations. It ran concurrently with the non-first-class Hanif Mohammad Trophy, contested by ten regional associations. Karachi Whites won the competition by defeating Faisalabad in the final.

== Squads ==
The Pakistan Cricket Board confirmed all the squads for the tournament.

Faisalabad	FATA	Karachi Whites	Lahore Blues	Lahore Whites	Multan	Peshawar	Rawalpindi
Faheem Ashraf (c); Ali Shan wk)	Rehan Afridi (c & wk)	Sarfaraz Ahmed (c & wk); Asad Shafiq (vc); Mohammad Hasan (wk)	Imran Butt (c); Junaid Ali (wk)	Saad Nasim (c); Hamza Akbar (wk)	Zain Abbas (c); Haseebullah Khan (wk)	Sahibzada Farhan (c)	Umar Waheed (c); Umair Masood (wk)

== Venues ==
Lahore	Abbottabad	Rawalpindi	Rawalpindi
Gaddafi Stadium	Abbottabad Cricket Stadium	Rawalpindi Cricket Stadium	Shoaib Akhtar Stadium
Capacity: 27,000	Capacity: 4,000	Capacity: 17,000	Capacity: 8,000
Matches: 8	Matches: 7	Matches: 7	Matches: 7
2023–24 Quaid-e-Azam Trophy is located in Pakistan

== Points table ==
Team	Pld	W	L	D	T	NR	Pts	NRR
Faisalabad	7	3	1	3	0	0	108	-0.209
Karachi Whites	7	2	0	5	0	0	100	0.277
Lahore Blues	7	2	1	4	0	0	99	0.130
Lahore Whites	7	1	0	6	0	0	90	0.334
Peshawar	7	2	2	3	0	0	85	0.031
Multan	7	0	1	6	0	0	67	0.319
Rawalpindi	7	1	3	3	0	0	59	-0.451
FATA	7	0	3	4	0	0	52	-0.453

- The top 2 teams qualified for the Final

Points:
Outright Win: 16, Draw: 5, Tied: 8, Abandoned, 5

Winning Bonus Points:
Winning the match after follow-on: 2, Win with an innings margin: 1, Saving the match after follow-on: 1

Batting Points For First Innings (100 overs):
200 Runs: 1, 250 Runs: 2, 300 Runs: 3, 350 Runs: 4, 400 Runs: 5

Bowling Points For First Innings (100 overs):

1. Over-Based Points: 3 Wickets: 1, 6 Wickets: 2, 8 Wickets: 3
2. All-Out Bonus Points: 200 or Less: 3, 250 or Less: 2, 300 or Less: 1

== Fixtures ==
=== Round 1 ===
10–13 September 2023
Scorecard

Lahore Blues	v	Lahore Whites
248 (81.3 overs); Hussain Talat 61 (105); Ahmed Bashir 4/23 (13.3 overs)		432 (124.5 overs); Saad Nasim 221 (291); Kashif Bhatti 3/105 (44.5 overs)
329/8 (101 overs); Qasim Akram 115* (170); Ahmed Bashir 3/77 (19 overs)

Match drawn
Gaddafi Stadium, Lahore
Umpires: Mohammad Asif and Zulfiqar Jan

- Lahore Withe won the toss and elected to field.
- Fahad Munir made his first-class debut.
- Points: Lahore Blues 9, Lahore Whites 14

10–13 September 2023
Scorecard

Karachi Whites	v	Peshawar
332 (103.4 overs); Khurram Manzoor 87 (226); Mohammad Ilyas 4/84 (27 overs)		301 (84.5 overs); Sahibzada Farhan 85 (90); Ghulam Mudassar 3/36 (13.2 overs)
329/7d (59 overs); Asad Shafiq 76 (111); Abbas Afridi 3/86 (15.4 overs)		244 (65.3 overs); Waqar Ahmed 54 (88); Abrar Ahmed 4/67 (22.3 overs)

Karachi Whites won by 116 runs
Abbottabad Cricket Stadium, Abbottabad
Umpires: Farooq Ali Khan and Saqib Khan

- Peshawar won the toss and elected to field.
- Abbas Ali (Peshawar), Abuzar Tariq (Peshawar) and Aftab Ibrahim (Karachi Whites) all made their first-class debuts.
- Points: Karachi Whites 22, Peshawar 5

10–13 September 2023
Scorecard

Multan	v	Faisalabad
233 (80.4 overs); Zain Abbas 65 (91); Ahmed Safi Abdullah 8/62 (29 overs)		269 (80 overs); Asif Ali 69 (61); Ali Usman 5/66 (28 overs)
221 (67.1 overs); Imran Rafiq 68 (108); Mohammad Ali 3/38 (12.1 overs)		186/5 (51.3 overs); Azeem Ghumman 40 (98); Majid Ali 3/31 (9 overs)

Faisalabad won by 5 wickets
Shoaib Akhtar Stadium, Rawalpindi
Umpires: Shozab Raza and Mohammad Sajid

- Multan won the toss and elected to bat.
- Irfan Khan (Faisalabad) and Sirajuddin (Multan) both made their first-class debuts.
- Points: Faisalabad 23, Multan 5

10–13 September 2023
Scorecard

FATA	v	Rawalpindi
318 (92.1 overs); Mohammed Usman 99 (160); Bilawal Bhatti 4/89 (23 overs)		144 (46.2overs); Mubasir Khan 42 (76); Sameen Gul 8/51 (14.2 overs)
225/6d (73 overs); Salman Khan 110 (199); Mehran Mumtaz 3/83 (28 overs)		293/7 (98 overs); Hasan Raza 79 (139); Akif Javed 4/67 (19 overs)

Match drawn
Rawalpindi Cricket Stadium, Rawalpindi
Umpires: Abdul Muqeet and Waleed Yaqub

- Rawalpindi won the toss and elected to field.
- Kashif Ali, Shiraz Khan (Rawalpindi) and Mohammad Usman, Mohammad Wasim Khan, Salman Khan, Zeeshan Ahmad (FATA) all made their first-class debuts.
- Points: FATA 14, Rawalpindi 8

=== Round 2 ===
16–19 September 2023
Scorecard

Lahore Whites	v	Rawalpindi
407/3d (100.3 overs); Ali Zaryab 182 (289); Kashif Ali 2/88 (25 overs)		232/1 (63 overs); Abdul Faseeh 113* (188); Mohammad Irfan 1/39 (12 overs)

Match drawn
Gaddafi Stadium, Lahore
Umpires: Mohammad Asif and Zulfiqar Jan

- Rawalpindi won the toss and elected to field.
- No play was possible on Day 4 due to rain.
- Mohammad Naved (Lahore Whithes) made his first-class debut.
- Points: Lahore Whites 10, Rawalpindi 6

16–19 September 2023
Scorecard

Multan	v	Peshawar
286/7 (90 overs); Sharoon Siraj 70 (143); Abbas Afridi 4/84 (21 overs)		263 (82.3 overs); Kamran Ghulam 117 (216); Siraj Uddin 4/45 (18.3 overs)

Match drawn
Shoaib Akhtar Stadium, Rawalpindi
Umpires: Mohammad Sajid and Nasir Hussain

- Multan won the toss and elected to field.
- No play was possible on Day 2 due to rain.
- Points: Peshawar 11, Multan 9

16–19 September 2023
Scorecard

Faisalabad	v	Karachi Whites
122 (52.4 overs); Ali Shan 36 (112); Ghulam Mudassar 5/35 (12.4 overs)		434/5d (114overs); Sarfaraz Ahmed 128* (183); Mohammad Ali 2/82 (27 overs)
103/1 (49 overs) (f/o); Ali Shan 46* (150); Nauman Ali 1/15 (17 overs)

Match drawn
Rawalpindi Cricket Stadium, Rawalpindi
Umpires: Abdul Muqeet and Majid Hussain

- Faisalabad won the toss and elected to field.
- Points: Karachi Whites 15, Faisalabad 7

16–19 September 2023
Scorecard

FATA	v	Lahore Blues
140 (49.1 overs); Salman Khan 40 (45); Hunain Shah 3/22 (13 overs)		314 (73.3 overs); Waqas Ahmed 53 (54); Aimal Khan 3/82 (19 overs)
214 (56 overs); Khushdil Shah 73 (99); Ali Shafiq 5/34 (16 overs)		41/1 (8.2 overs); Imran Butt 22* (24); Akif Javed 1/13 (4 overs)

Lahore Blues won by 9 wickets
Abbottabad Cricket Stadium, Abbottabad
Umpires: Farooq Ali Khan and Saqib Khan

- Lahore Blues won the toss and elected to field.
- No play was possible on Day 1 due to rain.
- Aimal Khan made his first-class debut.
- Points: Lahore Blues 23, Federally Administered Tribal Areas 5

=== Round 3 ===
22–25 September 2023
Scorecard

Lahore Whites	v	Multan
304/6 (78 overs); Abid Ali 164* 215; Siraj Uddin 2/62 (14 overs)		346/7d (100 overs); Zain Abbas 94 (149); Mohammad Naved 2/73 (15 overs)

Match drawn
Gaddafi Stadium, Lahore
Umpires: Faisal Afridi and Rashid Riaz

- Multan won the toss and elected to bat.
- No play was possible on Day 2 due to rain.
- Hamayun Altaf and Tahir Hussain (Multan) both made their first-class debuts.
- Points: Multan 10, Lahore Whites 10

22–25 September 2023
Scorecard

Peshawar	v	Rawalpindi
317 (88.3 overs); Waqar Ahmed 184 (274); Kashif Ali 5/101 (26 overs)		137 (53.1 overs); Aqib Shah 37 (114); Niaz Khan 5/53 (17.1 overs)
		87 (27.2 overs); Bilawal Bhatti 20 (26); Mohammad Ilyas 5/26 (7 overs)

Peshawar won by an innings and 93 runs
Abbottabad Cricket Stadium, Abbottabad
Umpires: Mohammad Asif and Waheed Yaqoob

- Peshawar won the toss and elected to field.
- Awais Anwar (Rawalpindi) made his first-class debut.
- Points: Peshawar 26, Rawalpindi 3

22–25 September 2023
Scorecard

Faisalabad	v	Lahore Blues
211 (83.2 overs); Abubakar Khan 63 (185); Ali Shafiq 5/36 (20 overs)		201 (59.5 overs); Nisar Ahmad 44 (57); Faheem Ashraf 3/39 (14 overs)
188/7 (51 overs); Irfan Khan 39 (44); Nisar Ahmad 2/43 (11 overs)

Match drawn
Rawalpindi Cricket Stadium, Rawalpindi
Umpires: Aslam Bareach and Majid Hussain

- Lahore Blues won the toss and elected to field.
- Awaiz Zafar (Faisalabad) and Shawaiz Irfan (Lahore) both made their first-class debuts.
- Points: Faisalabad 11, Lahore Blues 11

22–25 September 2023
Scorecard

FATA	v	Karachi Whites
184 (70.5 overs); Mohammad Sarwar 70 (162); Ghulam Mudassar 5/44 (19 overs)		144 (66.1 overs); Rameez Aziz 45 (126); Irfanullah Shah 4/35 (21 overs)
		1/0 (6 overs); Khurram Manzoor 1* (21)

Match drawn
Shoaib Akhtar Stadium, Rawalpindi
Umpires: Nasir Hussain and Tariq Rasheed

- FATA won the toss and elected to field.
- Sahil Yousaf (FATA) made his first-class debut.
- Points: Karachi Whites 11, Federally Administered Tribal Areas 11

=== Round 4 ===
28 September–1 October 2023
Scorecard

Lahore Whites	v	Karachi Whites
509/9d (137.2 overs); Ali Zaryab 222 (313); Noman Ali 6/162 (48 overs)		784/5 (206.2 overs); Sarfaraz Ahmed 200* (236); Saad Nasim 2/112 (32 overs)

Match drawn
Gaddafi Stadium, Lahore
Umpires: Ghulam Sarwar and Rashid Riaz

- Karachi Whites won the toss and elected to field.
- Points: Lahore Whites 11, Karachi Whites 10

28 September–1 October 2023
Scorecard

Lahore Blues	v	Peshawar
334 (85.1 overs); Hussain Talat 87 (167); Niaz Khan 3/73 (20 overs)		360 (95.4 overs); Sahibzada Farhan 132 (175); Kashif Bhatti 4/59 (21.4 overs)
215 (68.2); Nisar Ahmad 48 (74); Niaz Khan 3/52 (16 overs)		192/7 (62.2 overs); Kamran Ghulam 50 (99); Waqas Ahmed 2/48 (14.4 overs)

Peshawar won by 3 wickets
Abbottabad Cricket Stadium, Abbottabad
Umpires: Mohammad Asif and Majid Hussain

- Lahore Blues won the toss and elected to bat.
- Points: Peshawar 23, Lahore Blues 6

28 September–1 October 2023
Scorecard

Faisalabad	v	Rawalpindi
112 (39.3 overs); Ali Waqas 26 (49); Muhammad Faizan 5/35 (12 overs)		144 (56.3 overs); Zeeshan Malik 108 (173); Faheem Ashraf 5/12 (14.3 overs)
234 (74.4 overs); Mohammad Huraira 87 (139); Muhammad Faizan 4/84 (22 overs)		204/3 (55.3 overs); Abdul Faseeh 109* (163); Khurram Shehzad 1/21 (9 overs)

Rawalpindi won by 7 wickets
Rawalpindi Cricket Stadium, Rawalpindi
Umpires: Aslam Bareach and Nasir Hussain

- Rawalpindi won the toss and elected to field.
- Muhammad Faizan (Rawalpindi) and Ali Asfand (Faisalabad) both made their first-class debuts.
- Points: Rawalpindi 22, Faisalabad 6

28 September–1 October 2023
Scorecard

FATA	v	Multan
348 (90.2 overs); Rehan Afridi 164 (196); Zahid Mahmood 5/135 (28 overs)		529/5d (111.4 overs); Zain Abbas 292 (337); Sameen Gul 2/75 (22.4 overs)
336/9 (128.3 overs) (f/o); Mohammad Irfan 84 (177); Hamayun Altaf 2/23 (7.3 overs)

Match drawn
Shoaib Akhtar Stadium, Rawalpindi
Umpires: Faisal Afridi and Tariq Rasheed

- FATA won the toss and elected to field.
- Haseeb Khan (FATA) and Mohammad Basit Ali (Multan) both made their first-class debuts.
- Points: Multan 13, Federally Administered Tribal Areas 10

=== Round 5 ===
4–7 October 2023
Scorecard

Lahore Whites	v	Peshawar
568 (161.2 overs); Ahmed Shehzad 253 (409); Mehran Ibrahim 5/57 (17 overs)		589 (174.3 overs); Sahibzada Farhan 245 (429); Mohammad Rameez 6/221 (68.3 overs)

Match drawn
Gaddafi Stadium, Lahore
Umpires: Ghulam Sarwar and Shozab Raza

- Lahore Whites won the toss and elected to bat.
- Muneeb Wasif (Lahore Whites) made his first-class debut.
- Points: Lahore Whites 10, Peshawar 9

4–7 October 2023
Scorecard

Faisalabad	v	FATA
215 (79.5 overs); Faheem Ashraf 76 (110); Asif Afridi 3/37 (17 overs)		128 (43.4 overs); Mohammad Sarwar 35 (63); Khurram Shehzad 6/23 (9.4 overs)
220 (62 overs); Irfan Khan 68* (76); Asif Afridi 4/49 (17 overs)		181 (66.4 overs); Mohammad Sarwar 59 (143); Khurram Shehzad 4/55 (19.4 overs)

Faisalabad won by 126 runs
Abbottabad Cricket Stadium, Abbottabad
Umpires: Faisal Afridi and Imran Javed

- FATA won the toss and elected to field.
- Mohammad Saleem and Shehzad Gul (Faisalabad) both made their first-class debuts.
- Points: Faisalabad 23, Federally Administered Tribal Areas 5

4–7 October 2023
Scorecard

Lahore Blues	v	Rawalpindi
396 (99.3 overs); Hussain Talat 104 (178); Kashif Ali 6/86 (22.3 overs)		176 (50.2 overs); Mehran Mumtaz 40 (46); Hussain Talat 4/55 (17 overs)
126/3 (24.3 overs); Usman Salahuddin 39* (52); Kashif Ali 2/45 (11 overs)		345 (109.3 overs) (f/o); Taimur Khan 166* (232); Hunain Shah 4/61 (17.3 overs)

Lahore Blues won by 7 wickets
Rawalpindi Cricket Stadium, Rawalpindi
Umpires: Aaley Haider and Imtiaz Iqbal

- Rawalpindi won the toss and elected to field.
- Hashim Ibrahim (Lahore Blues) made his first-class debut.
- Points: Lahore Blues 26, Rawalpindi 3

4–7 October 2023
Scorecard

Karachi Whites	v	Multan
194 (64.2 overs); Saim Ayub 40 (62); Zahid Mahmood 5/69 (23 overs)		220 (50.2 overs); Basit Ali 60 (75); Tabish Khan 3/40 (12 overs)
243/3 (82 overs); Saim Ayub 142* (248); Ali Usman 2/69 (24 overs)		405 (134 overs); Sharoon Siraj 83 (180); Aaliyan Mehmood 4/89 (26 overs)

Match drawn
Shoaib Akhtar Stadium, Rawalpindi
Umpires: Abdul Muqeet and Qaiser Khan

- Multan Region won the toss and elected to bat.
- Points: Multan 12, Karachi Whites 10

=== Round 6 ===
10–13 October 2023
Scorecard

FATA	v	Lahore Whites
97 (26 overs); Khushdil Shah 21 (27); Ahmed Bashir 6/21 (11 overs)		423/8d (100 overs); Tayyab Tahir 102 (184); Asif Afridi 5/103 (23 overs)
208 (68.1 overs); Azaz Khan 52 (143); Ahmed Bashir 3/28 (16 overs)

Lahore Whites won by an innings and 118 runs
Abbottabad Cricket Stadium, Abbottabad
Umpires: Aaley Haider and Imran Javed

- Lahore Whites won the toss and elected to field.
- Aizaz Khan (FATA) made his first-class debut.
- Points: Lahore Whites 28, Federally Administered Tribal Areas 3

10–13 October 2023
Scorecard

Faisalabad	v	Peshawar
313 (116 overs); Ali Waqas 118 (272); Abbas Afridi 3/59 (22 overs)		216 (72.2 overs); Kamran Ghulam 64 (125); Mohammad Ali 5/45 (18 overs)
111/4 (30.2 overs); Raees Ahmed 34 (61); Niaz Khan 3/22 (9 overs)		205 (65 overs); Sahibzada Farhan 92 (120); Mohammad Ali 5/54 (18 overs)

Faisalabad won by 6 wickets
Rawalpindi Cricket Stadium, Rawalpindi
Umpires: Asif Yaqoob and Imtiaz Iqbal

- Faisalabad won the toss and elected to field.
- Player Replacement (Faisalabad): Raees Ahmed in, Abubakar Khan out (2nd innings, 114.3 overs)
- Points: Faisalabad 24, Peshawar 3

10–13 October 2023
Scorecard

Karachi Whites	v	Rawalpindi
228 (66.1 overs); Shan Masood 90 (97); Kashif Ali 5/60 (19.1 overs)		243 (84.3 overs); Jamal Anwar 89 (199); Mir Hamza 4/61 (24.3 overs)
157/9 (57.4 overs); Asad Shafiq 36 (82); Jahandad Khan 4/49 (15 overs)		141 (55.2 overs); Abdul Faseeh 50 (121); Mir Hamza 6/37 (18 overs)

Karachi Whites won by 1 wicket
Shoaib Akhtar Stadium, Rawalpindi
Umpires: Kashif Sohail and Waleed Yaqub

- Karachi Whites won the toss and elected to field.
- Jahandad Khan (Rawalpindi) made his first-class debut.
- Points: Karachi Whites 22, Rawalpindi 6

10–13 October 2023
Scorecard

Lahore Blues	v	Multan
578/6 (162 overs); Imran Butt 255 (401); Ali Usman 2/142 (50 overs)		718/8d (179 overs); Zain Abbas 118 (174); Qasim Akram 3/163 (35 overs)

Match drawn
Gaddafi Stadium, Lahore
Umpires: Qaiser Khan and Imranullah Aslam

- Lahore Blues won the toss and elected to field.
- Hammad Butt (Lahore Blues) made his first-class debut.
- Points: Multan 10, Lahore Blues 10

=== Round 7 ===
16–19 October 2023
Scorecard

Faisalabad	v	Lahore Whites
472 (128.2 overs); Ali Waqas 15* (282); Saad Nasim 3/41 (13.2 overs)		245 (52.1 overs); Ali Zaryab 51 (69); Faheem Ashraf 3/26 (11.1 overs)
		2/1 (3 overs); Imran Dogar 2 (7); Khurram Shehzad 1/2 (2 overs)

Match drawn
Rawalpindi Cricket Stadium, Rawalpindi
Umpires: Kashif Sohail and Mohammad Sajid

- Faisalabad won the toss and elected to field.
- Points: Lahore Whites 7, Faisalabad 15

16–19 October 2023
Scorecard

FATA	v	Peshawar
		360/3 (83 overs); Sahibzada Farhan 140 (148); Asif Afridi 2/68 (24 overs)

Match drawn
Abbottabad Cricket Stadium, Abbottabad
Umpires: Imran Javed and Qaiser Khan
Player of the match: Imran Javed and Qaiser Khan

- FATA won the toss and elected to field.
- No play was possible on Day 1,2 and 3 due to rain.
- Kashif Noor, Muhammad Farooq, Shahid Aziz (FATA) and Zain Khan, Najibullah (Peshawar) all their first-class debuts.
- Points: Peshawar 9, Federally Administered Tribal Areas 6

16–19 October 2023
Scorecard

Multan	v	Rawalpindi
		501/4 (118 overs); Haider Ali 170* (228); Siraj Uddin 1/71 (15 overs)

Match drawn
Shoaib Akhtar Stadium, Rawalpindi
Umpires: Aaley Haider and Abdul Muqeet

- Multan won the toss and elected to field.
- No play was possible on Day 2 due to rain.
- Farhan Sarfraz (Multan) made his first-class debut.
- Points: Rawalpindi 10, Multan 6

16–19 October 2023
Scorecard

Karachi Whites	v	Lahore Blues
161 (42 overs); Sarfaraz Ahmed 51 (70); Usman Qadir 4/27 (6 overs)		203 (58.2 overs); Hashim Ibrahim 51 (71); Mir Hamza 4/69 (21 overs)
213/6 (54 overs); Omair Yousuf 65 (87); Asfand Mehran 2/52 (14.1 overs)

Match drawn
Gaddafi Stadium, Lahore
Umpires: Aleem Dar and Imranullah Aslam

- Lahore Blues won the toss and elected to field.
- No play was possible on Day 2 due to rain.
- Tariq Nawaz (Lahore Blues) made his first-class debut.
- Points: Karachi Whites 10, Lahore Blues 12

== Final ==
22–26 October 2023
Scorecard

Faisalabad	v	Karachi Whites
124 (26 overs); Irfan Khan 32 (33); Mir Hamza 5/44 (14.5 overs)		543 (120.2 overs); Saim Ayub 203 (259); Mohammad Ali 3/63 (14.2 overs)
333 (88 overs); Faheem Ashraf 147 9181); Ghulam Mudassar 3/62 (16 overs)		370/7d (98.1 overs); Asad Shafiq 113 (222); Khurram Shahzad 2/49 (17.1 overs)

Karachi Whites won by 456 runs
Gaddafi Stadium, Lahore
Umpires: Aleem Dar and Rashid Riaz
Player of the match: Saim Ayub (Karachi Whites)

- Faisalabad won the toss and elected to field.
- Ghazi Ghouri (Karachi Whites) made his first-class debut.
