= 2025–26 National T20 Cup =

Cricket tournament in Pakistan

The 2025–26 National T20 Cup, also known as ABS Developers National T20 Cup 2025–26 for sponsorship reasons, was the 22nd season of the National T20 Cup, a professional Twenty20 domestic cricket competition in Pakistan. The tournament took place from 7 March to 7 June 2026, featuring ten regional teams. Organised by the Pakistan Cricket Board (PCB), this season introduced a restructured format compared to previous editions, with a focus on a qualifiers and Super 10 stage.

== Format ==
The 2025–26 National T20 Cup featured a new structure, as outlined by the Pakistan Cricket Board (PCB). The tournament began with a qualifying stage, followed by a Super 10 stage, where the ten teams competed in a two-group round-robin format. The top-performing teams advanced to the knockout phase, which included two semi-finals and a final. Matches were played at the Imran Khan Cricket Stadium in Peshawar and at the Gadaffi Stadium in Lahore to ensure a centralised venue for both competitions.

== 2025–26 National T20 Cup (Qualifier) ==
National T20 (Qualifier)
- Dates: 14 – 24 February 2026
- Administrator: Pakistan Cricket Board
- Cricket format: Twenty20
- Tournament format(s): Group stage Round-robin and Final
- Host: Pakistan
- Champions: Bahawalpur (1st title)
- Runners-up: Karachi Blues
- Participants: 10
- Matches: 21
- Player of the series: Wahaj Riaz (Karachi Blues)
- Most runs: Ahsan Ali (176)
- Most wickets: Wahaj Riaz (11)

The 2025–26 National T20 Cup (Qualifier) was the qualifying tournament for the 2025–26 National T20 Cup (Super 10) stage. Ten teams took part in the tournament; teams were divided into two groups of five, where each team played four matches. Top teams from each group played the final.

=== Teams ===
Group A	Group B
Azad Jammu and Kashmir; Islamabad; Karachi Blues; Larkana; Quetta	Bahawalpur; Dera Murad Jamali; Federally Administered Tribal Areas; Hyderabad; Rawalpindi

=== Standings ===
==== Group A ====
Pos	Team	Pld	W	L	NR	Pts	NRR	Qualification
1	Karachi Blues	4	4	0	0	8	0.605	Advanced to the final and also qualified for 2025–26 National T20 Cup
2	Quetta	4	3	1	0	6	0.984	Stay in the National T20 qualifier for next season
3	Islamabad	4	2	2	0	4	0.647	Stay in the National T20 qualifier for next season
4	Larkana	4	1	3	0	2	−1.600	Stay in the National T20 qualifier for next season
5	Azad Jammu and Kashmir	4	0	4	0	0	−0.611	Stay in the National T20 qualifier for next season

Source: ESPNcricinfo

==== Group B ====
Pos	Team	Pld	W	L	NR	Pts	NRR	Qualification
1	Bahawalpur	4	3	1	0	6	0.550	Advanced to the final and also qualified for 2025–26 National T20 Cup
2	Rawalpindi	4	2	2	0	4	0.690	Stay in the National T20 qualifier for next season
3	Federally Administered Tribal Areas	4	2	2	0	4	0.310	Stay in the National T20 qualifier for next season
4	Hyderabad	4	2	2	0	4	−1.070	Stay in the National T20 qualifier for next season
5	Dera Murad Jamali	4	1	3	0	2	−0.919	Stay in the National T20 qualifier for next season

Source: ESPNcricinfo

=== League stage ===
Group A
14 February 2026
16:00 (D/N)
Scorecard

Quetta; 146/5 (20 overs)	v	Karachi Blues; 150/6 (19.2 overs)
Haseebullah Khan 50* (42); Fahad Amin 2/31 (3 overs)		Usman Rahim 55* (40); Mohammad Ibrahim 2/25 (4 overs)

Karachi Blues won by 4 wickets
Gaddafi Stadium, Lahore
Player of the match: Usman Rahim (Karachi Blues)

- Karachi Blues won the toss and elected to field.
- Usman Rahim, Mohammad Raza, Wahaj Riaz (Karachi Blues) and Sayed Jahangir Shah (Quetta) all made their T20 debuts.

Group A
14 February 2026
20:30 (N)
Scorecard

Islamabad; 207/3 (20 overs)	v	Larkana; 129 (17.4 overs)
Umair Riaz 73* (50); Zahid Mahmood 1/27 (4 overs)		Malhar Rasool 56 (40); Umair Afridi 3/29 (3.4 overs)

Islamabad won by 78 runs
Gaddafi Stadium, Lahore
Umpires: Mohammad Imran and Mohammad Sajid
Player of the match: Umair Riaz (Islamabad)

- Larkana won the toss and elected to field.
- Aamir Ali, Malhar Rasool, Mahammad Huzaifa, Saqlain Nawaz (Larkana) Rizwan ALi and Shahbaz Khan (Islamabad) all made their T20 debuts.

Group B
15 February 2026
16:00 (D/N)
Scorecard

Federally Administered Tribal Areas; 168/6 (20 overs)	v	Rawalpindi; 127 (18 overs)
Khushdil Shah 94 (57); Jahandad Khan 3/39 (4 overs)		Nasir Nawaz 39 (38); Afaq Afridi 5/24 (4 overs)

Federally Administered Tribal Areas won by 41 runs
Gaddafi Stadium, Lahore
Umpires: Faisal Afridi and Mohammad Asif
Player of the match: Khushdil Shah (Federally Administered Tribal Areas)

- Rawalpindi won the toss and elected to field.
- Khubaib Khalil, Mohammad Wasim Khan (Federally Administered Tribal Areas) and Abdul Qadir (Rawalpindi) all made their T20 debuts.

Group B
15 February 2026
20:30 (N)
Scorecard

Hyderabad; 178/7 (20 overs)	v	Dera Murad Jamali; 178/7 (20 overs)
Daniyal Hussain 44 (17); Farhan Ullah 2/31 (4 overs)		Farhan Ullah 51 (35); Mohammad Hasnain 2/27 (4 overs)

Match tied (Hyderabad won the Super Over)
Gaddafi Stadium, Lahore
Umpires: Mahmood Arshad and Khalid Mahmood
Player of the match: Daniyal Hussain (Hyderabad)

- Dera Murad Jamali won the toss and elected to field.
- Sajjad Ali, Mohammad Khan, Farhan Ullah (Dera Murad Jamali) and Shehryar Baloch (Hyderabad) all made their T20 debut.
- Super Over: Dera Murad Jamali 4/2, Hyderabad 5/0.

Group A
16 February 2026
16:00 (D/N)
Scorecard

Larkana; 160/7 (20 overs)	v	Karachi Blues; 164/7 (20 overs)
Zahid Mahmood 48* (32); Wahaj Riaz 3/14 (3 overs)		Ahsan Ali 65 (38); Ali Asghar 3/29 (3 overs)

Karachi Blues won by 3 wickets
Gaddafi Stadium, Lahore
Umpires: Farooq Ali Khan and Ahmed Shahab
Player of the match: Wahaj Riaz (Karachi Blues)

- Aqeel Danish, Zahid Hussain (Larkana) and Maaz Khurram (Karachi Blues) all made their T20 debuts.

Group A
16 February 2026
20:30 (N)
Scorecard

Azad Jammu and Kashmir; 187/5 (20 overs)	v	Islamabad; 188/5 (18.5 overs)
Hasnain Shamir 69 (49); Umair Afridi 2/34 (4 overs)		Naseerullah 55 (30); Saad Asif 2/34 (4 overs)

Islamabad won by 5 wickets
Gaddafi Stadium, Lahore
Umpires: Mohammad Imran and Mohammad Sajid
Player of the match: Naseerullah (Islamabad)

- Azad Jammu and Kashmir won the toss and elected bat.
- Arsalan Mehzood, Hasnain Shamir and Umar Hayat (Azad Jammu and Kashmir) all made their T20 debut.

Group B
17 February 2026
16:00 (D/N)
Scorecard

Federally Administered Tribal Areas; 194/5 (20 overs)	v	Dera Murad Jamali; 120 (19.1 overs)
Rehan Afridi 76* (52); Saleem Mal 2/42 (4 overs)		Dawood Khan 52 (34); Khushdil Shah 4/28 (4 overs)

Federally Administered Tribal Areas won by 74 runs
Gaddafi Stadium, Lahore
Umpires: Irfan Haider and Saqib Khan
Player of the match: Mohammad Sarwar (Federally Administered Tribal Areas)

- Federally Administered Tribal Areas won the toss and elected to bat.
- Mohammad Ali (Dera Murad Jamali) made his T20 debut.

Group B
17 February 2026
20:30 (N)
Scorecard

Rawalpindi; 181/4 (20 overs)	v	Bahawalpur; 110 (14.5 overs)
Mubasir Khan 45* (30); Mohammad Junaid 2/27 (3 overs)		Mohammad Sudais 48 (38); Mehran Mumtaz 5/12 (3 overs)

Rawalpindi won by 71 runs
Gaddafi Stadium, Lahore
Player of the match: Mehran Mumtaz (Rawalpindi)

- Rawalpindi won the toss and elected to bat.
- Mohammad Basit, Ali Afzal and Mohammad Umair (Bahawalpur) all made their T20 debuts.
- Mehran Mumtaz (Rawalpindi) took his maiden five-wicket haul in T20s.

Group A
18 February 2026
19:00 (N)
Scorecard

Larkana; 131/8 (20 overs)	v	Azad Jammu and Kashmir; 115 (18.3 overs)
Zahid Hussain 33 (33); Zaman Khan 2/31 (4 overs)		Hasnain Shamir 37 (37); Mushtaq Ahmed 4/14 (4 overs)

Larkana won by 16 runs
Gaddafi Stadium, Lahore
Umpires: Mohammad Imran and Kashif Sohail
Player of the match: Mushtaq Ahmed (Larkana)

- Larkana won the toss and elected to bat.
- Ubaid Raza (Larkana) made his T20 debut.

Group A
18 February 2026
23:15 (N)
Scorecard

Islamabad; 177/7 (20 overs)	v	Quetta; 179/2 (18.5 overs)
Ali Imran 45 (37); Mohammad Junaid 2/29 (3 overs)		Abdul Bangalzai 85* (59); Naseerullah 1/16 (2 overs)

Quetta won by 8 wickects
Gaddafi Stadium, Lahore
Umpires: Hassan Mahmood and Rashid Riaz
Player of the match: Abdul Bangalzai (Quetta)

- Islamabad won the toss and elected to bat.
- Nusratullah (Islamabad) made his T20 debut.

Group B
19 February 2026
19:00 (D/N)
Scorecard

Hyderabad; 111/8 (20 overs)	v	Bahawalpur; 114/3 (9.3 overs)
Rizwan Mehmood 56* (51); Mohammad Basit 2/15 (4 overs)		Mohammad Akram 50 (15); Daniyal Hussain 1/7 (1 over)

Bahawalpur won by 7 wickets
Gaddafi Stadium, Lahore
Umpires: Faisal Afridi and Mahmood Arshad
Player of the match: Mohammad Akram (Bahawalpur)

- Hyderabad won the toss and elected to bat.

Group B
19 February 2026
23:15 (N)
Scorecard

Rawalpindi; 158/7 (20 overs)	v	Dera Murad Jamali; 159/3 (19.3 overs)
Mehran Mumtaz 44* (19); Sajjad Ahmed 3/34 (4 overs)		Nasir Khan 54 (36); Jahandad Khan 2/36 (4 overs)

Dera Murad Jamali won by 7 wickets
Gaddafi Stadium, Lahore
Umpires: Irfan Haider and Abdul Muqeet
Player of the match: Nasir Khan (Dera Murad Jamali)

- Rawalpindi won the toss and elected to bst.
- Sajjad Ahmed (Dera Murad Jamali) made his T20 debut.

Group A
20 February 2026
19:00 (N)
Scorecard

Azad Jammu and Kashmir; 152/7 (20 overs)	v	Karachi Blues; 153/5 (19 overs)
Hasnain Nadeem 59 (52); Wahaj Riaz 3/20 (4 overs)		Ghazi Ghori 50 (37); Faizan Saleem 3/21 (4 overs)

Karachi Blues won by 5 wickets
Gaddafi Stadium, Lahore
Umpires: Rashid Riaz and Ahmed Shahab
Player of the match: Wahaj Riaz (Karachi Blues)

- Karchi Blues won the toss and elected to field.
- Jawad Imtiaz, Aamer Nazir (Azad Jammu and Kashmir), Asad Akhtar, Rehman Ghani and Shah Raza Naqvi (Karachi Blues) all made their T20 debuts.

Group A
20 February 2026
23:15 (N)
Scorecard

Quetta; 186/6 (20 overs)	v	Larkana; 124/6 (20 overs)
Bismillah Khan 51 (32); Mushtaq Ahmed 2/39 (4 overs)		Ghulam Raza 52 (39); Mohammad Ibrahim 3/15 (3 overs)

Quetta won by 62 runs
Gaddafi Stadium, Lahore
Umpires: Imtiaz Iqbal and Kamran Khalil
Player of the match: Bismillah Khan (Quetta)

- Larkana won the toss and elected to field.

Group B
21 February 2026
16:00 (D/N)
Scorecard

Hyderabad; 197/5 (20 overs)	v	Federally Administered Tribal Areas; 151/7 (20 overs)
Sharjeel Khan 56 (38); Sirajuddin 2/27 (4 overs)		Mohammad Naeem 55 (45); Shehryar Baloch 3/32 (4 overs)

Hyderabad won by 46 runs
Gaddafi Stadium, Lahore
Umpires: Imranullah Aslam and Mohammad Asif
Player of the match: Akbar Khan (Hyderabad)

- Hyderabad won the toss and elected to bat.
- Zain-ul-Abdin (Hyderabad) made his T20 debut.

Group B
21 February 2026
21:15 (N)
Scorecard

Bahawalpur; 104/9 (20 overs)	v	Dera Murad Jamali; 100 (20 overs)
Mohammad Ammar 39* (46); Farhan Ullah 3/13 (4 overs)		Fahad Hussain 39 (33); Mohammad Sudais 3/0 (1 over)

Bahawalpur won by 4 runs
Gaddafi Stadium, Lahore
Umpires: Zulfiqar Jan and Waleed Yaqub
Player of the match: Mohammad Sudais (Bahawalpur)

- Dera Murad Jamali won the toss and elected to field.

Group A
22 February 2026
16:00 (D/N)
Scorecard

Karachi Blues; 161/4 (20 overs)	v	Islamabad; 135 (19.2 overs)
Ahsan Ali 45 (33); Arsal Sheikh 2/28 (4 overs)		Arsal Sheikh 34 (25); Mohammad Raza 2/8 (3.2 overs)

Karachi Blues won by 26 runs
Gaddafi Stadium, Lahore
Umpires: Nasir Hussain and Kamran Khalil
Player of the match: Ahsan Ali (Karachi Blues)

- Karachi Blues won the toss and elected to bat.

Group A
22 February 2026
21:15 (N)
Scorecard

Azad Jammu and Kashmir; 149/7 (20 overs)	v	Quetta; 150/3 (18.3 overs)
Hasnain Shamir 59 (40); Khalil Ahmed 3/19 (4 overs)		Haseebullah Khan 49* (36); Usman Yousaf 2/20 (2 overs)

Quetta won by 7 wickets
Gaddafi Stadium, Lahore
Umpires: Hassan Mahmood and Ghulam Sarwar
Player of the match: Haseebullah Khan (Quetta)

- Azad Jammu and Kashmir won the toss and elected to bat.
- Adil Hussain Azad (Azad Jammu and Kashmir) made his T20 debut.

Group B
23 February 2026
16:00 (D/N)
Scorecard

Bahawalpur; 135 (20 overs)	v	Federally Administered Tribal Areas; 97 (17 overs)
Ali Hamza Wasim 27 (26); Khushdil Shah 4/21 (4 overs)		Mohammad Sarwar 25 (21); Mohammad Junaid 5/16 (4 overs)

Bahawalpur won by 38 runs
Gaddafi Stadium, Lahore
Umpires: Imran Javed and Waleed Yaqub
Player of the match: Mohammad Junaid (Bahawalpur)

- Bahawalpur won the toss and elected to bat.
- Ali Hamza Wasim (Bahawalpur) maade his T20 debut.
- Mohammad Junaid (Bahawalpur) took his maiden five-wicket haul in T20s.

Group B
23 February 2026
21:15 (N)
Scorecard

Hyderabad; 158/9 (20 overs)	v	Rawalpindi; 162/4 (16.5 overs)
Daniyal Hussain 31 (30); Kashif Ali 3/27 (4 overs)		Yasir Khan 74 (49); Daniyal Hussain 1/28 (2 overs)

Rawalpindi won by 6 wickets
Gaddafi Stadium, Lahore
Umpires: Mohammad Asif and Zulfiqar Jan
Player of the match: Yasir Khan (Rawalpindi)

- Rawalpindi won the toss and elected to field.
- Yousaf Nazir and Shehbaz Tabraiz (Rawalpindi) both made their T20 debuts.

=== Final ===
Final
24 February 2026 (N)
Scorecard

Bahawalpur; 172/5 (20 overs)	v	Karachi Blues; 113 (16 overs)
Mohammad Imran 80 (37); Wahaj Riaz 2/22 (4 overs)		Ahsan Ali 43 (29); Ali Shabbir 3/21 (4 overs)

Bahawalpur won by 59 runs
Gaddafi Stadium, Lahore
Umpires: Tariq Rasheed and Rashid Riaz
Player of the match: Mohammad Imran (Bahawalpur)

- Bahawalpur won the toss and elected to bat.

== 2025–26 National T20 Cup (Super 10) ==
2025–26 National T20 Cup
- Official logo
- Dates: 7 March – 7 June 2026
- Administrator: Pakistan Cricket Board
- Cricket format: Twenty20
- Tournament format: Round-robin
- Host: Pakistan
- Champions: Abbottabad (1st title)
- Runners-up: Karachi Whites
- Participants: 10
- Matches: 23
- Most runs: Kamran Ghulam (268)
- Most wickets: Usama Mir (16)

The 2025–26 National T20 Cup (Super 10) was a competition that featured the top eight teams from both groups in the previous season and the remaining two spots were filled by the top teams from each group of the Qualifier. Karachi Blues qualified for the main events as a group winner of pool A. Bahawalpur joins as a tenth team of the tournament after topping Group B.

Teams qualified for the 2025–26 National T20 Cup (Super 10)
Method of qualification	Berths	Qualified teams
2024–25 National T20 Cup (Top 2 teams from each groups of previous season)	8	Lahore Whites
2024–25 National T20 Cup (Top 2 teams from each groups of previous season)	8	Peshawar
2024–25 National T20 Cup (Top 2 teams from each groups of previous season)	8	Karachi Whites
2024–25 National T20 Cup (Top 2 teams from each groups of previous season)	8	Lahore Blues
2024–25 National T20 Cup (Top 2 teams from each groups of previous season)	8	Faisalabad
2024–25 National T20 Cup (Top 2 teams from each groups of previous season)	8	Abbottabad
2024–25 National T20 Cup (Top 2 teams from each groups of previous season)	8	Sialkot
2024–25 National T20 Cup (Top 2 teams from each groups of previous season)	8	Multan
Top team from the each group of National T20 Cup (Qualifier)	2	Karachi Blues
Top team from the each group of National T20 Cup (Qualifier)	2	Bahawalpur

=== Teams ===
Group A	Group B
Bahawalpur; Faisalabad; Karachi Whites; Lahore Whites; Peshawar	Abbottabad; Karachi Blues; Lahore Blues; Multan; Sialkot

=== Points table ===
==== Group A ====
Pos	Team	Pld	W	L	NR	Pts	NRR	Qualification
1	Karachi Whites	4	2	0	2	6	1.458	Advanced to the semi-final
2	Lahore Whites	4	2	1	1	5	0.674	Advanced to the semi-final
3	Faisalabad	4	2	2	0	4	0.075	Stay in National T20 Cup
4	Bahawalpur	4	1	2	1	3	−0.681	Stay in National T20 Cup
5	Peshawar	4	0	2	2	2	−1.085	Relegated to National T20 Cup (Qualifier)

Source: ESPNcricinfo

==== Group B ====
Pos	Team	Pld	W	L	NR	Pts	NRR	Qualification
1	Abbottabad	4	3	1	0	6	1.600	Advanced to the semi-final
2	Sialkot	4	3	1	0	6	1.290	Advanced to the semi-final
3	Multan	4	2	2	0	4	0.910	Stay in National T20 Cup
4	Karachi Blues	4	2	2	0	4	−0.130	Stay in National T20 Cup
5	Lahore Blues	4	0	4	0	0	−3.640	Relegated to National T20 Cup (Qualifier)

Source: ESPNcricinfo

=== Group fixtures ===
Group A
7 March 2026
16:15 (D/N)
Scorecard

Peshawar; 167/9 (20 overs)	v	Lahore Whites; 168/4 (17 overs)
Yasir Khan 65 (37); Aamer Jamal 3/40 (4 overs)		Farhan Yousaf 61* (31); Mohammad Nawaz 2/40 (4 overs)

Lahore Whites won by 6 wickets
Imran Khan Cricket Stadium, Peshawar
Umpires: Faisal Afridi and Abdul Muqeet
Player of the match: Farhan Yousaf (Lahore Whites)

- Peshawar won the toss and elected to bat.
- Mohammad Shoaib and Abuzar Tariq (Peshawar) both made their T20 debuts.

Group A
7 March 2026
21:15 (N)
Scorecard

Faisalabad; 171/7 (20 overs)	v	Karachi Whites; 174/2 (17.1 overs)
Awais Zafar 81* (53); Mohammad Umar 2/30 (4 overs); Saim Ayub 2/30 (4 overs)		Abdullah Fazal 76* (51); Zaman Khan 1/26 (3 overs); Mohammad Zeeshan 1/26 (3 overs)

Karachi Whites won by 8 wickets
Imran Khan Cricket Stadium, Peshawar
Umpires: Zulfiqar Jan and Rashid Riaz
Player of the match: Abdullah Fazal (Karachi Whites)

- Karachi Whites won the toss and elected to field.
- Asim Ali, Atiq-ur-Rehman (Faisalabad) and Rizwanullah (Karachi Whites) all made their T20 debuts.

Group B
8 March 2026
16:15 (D/N)
Scorecard

Multan; 203/6 (20 overs)	v	Abbottabad; 205/2 (20 overs)
Moheer Saeed 76 (41); Shadab Khan 3/35 (4 overs)		Kamran Ghulam 95* (48); Ali Majid 1/20 (4 overs)

Abbottabad won by 8 wickets
Imran Khan Cricket Stadium, Peshawar
Umpires: Faisal Afridi and Khalid Mahmood
Player of the match: Kamran Ghulam (Abbottabad)

- Multan won the toss and elected to bat.
- Hasan Hafeez, Moheer Saeed, Rana Abdul Wahab (Multan) Mohammad Mohsin Khan and Razaullah (Abbottabad) all made their T20 debuts.

Group B
8 March 2026
21:15 (N)
Scorecard

Karachi Blues; 201 (19.2 overs)	v	Sialkot; 161 (19.4 overs)
Usman Khan 81 (39); Abdul Subhan 4/41 (4 overs)		Usama Mir 63 (32); Khalil Ahmed 4/27 (4 overs)

Karachi Blues won by 40 runs
Imran Khan Cricket Stadium, Peshawar
Umpires: Saqib Khan and Rashid Riaz
Player of the match: Usman Khan (Karachi Blues)

- Sialkot won the toss and elected field.
- Ali Afzal and Khawaja Arham (Sialkot) both made their T20 debuts.

Group A
9 March 2026
16:15 (D/N)
Scorecard

Bahawalpur; 185/8 (20 overs)	v	Karachi Whites; 78/0 (9 overs)
Mohammad Imran 59 (35); Mohammad Umar 3/27 (4 overs)		Saim Ayub 59* (33)

Karachi Whites won by 12 runs (DLS method)
Imran Khan Cricket Stadium, Peshawar
Umpires: Faisal Afridi and Kashif Sohail
Player of the match: Saim Ayub (Karachi Whites)

- Karachi Whites won the toss and elected to field.
- Rain prevented any further play.
- Karachi Whites were 12 runs ahead of the DLS par score when rain interrupted the match.

Group A
9 March 2026
21:15 (N)
Scorecard

Faisalabad; 106/7 (10 overs)	v	Lahore Whites; 110/4 (9.4 overs)
Mubasir Khan 26 (10); Ahmed Daniyal 3/17 (2 overs)		Muhammad Akhlaq 48 (28); Mubasir Khan 2/11 (2 overs)

Lahore Whites won by 6 wickets (DLS method)
Imran Khan Cricket Stadium, Peshawar
Umpires: Zulfiqar Jan and Mohammad Sajid
Player of the match: Muhammad Akhlaq (Lahore Whites)

- Faisalabad won the toss and elected to field.
- The match was reduced to 10 overs per side due to rain.

Group B
10 March 2026
16:15 (D/N)
Scorecard

Karachi Blues; 201/4 (20 overs)	v	Abbottabad; 203/2 (16.4 overs)
Ahsan Ali 67 (36); Shadab Khan 2/32 (4 overs)		Kamran Ghulam 81* (42); Jahandad Khan 1/41 (4 overs)

Abbottabad won by 8 wickets
Imran Khan Cricket Stadium, Peshawar
Umpires: Nasir Hussain and Imtiaz Iqbal
Player of the match: Kamran Ghulam (Abbottabad)

- Abbottabad won the toss and elected to field.

Group B
10 March 2026
21:15 (N)
Scorecard

Multan; 200/6 (20 overs)	v	Lahore Blues; 197/6 (20 overs)
Mohammad Shehzad 54 (40); Mohammad Rizwan 3/39 (4 overs)		Umar Siddiq 91 (51); Arafat Minhas 2/23 (4 overs)

Multan won by 3 runs
Imran Khan Cricket Stadium, Peshawar
Umpires: Faisal Afridi and Aaley Haider
Player of the match: Aamer Yamin (Multan)

- Multan won the toss and elected to bat.
- Abdullah Asif, Ali Razzaq and Hamza Zahoor (Lahore Blues) all made their T20 debuts.

Group A
11 March 2026
16:15 (D/N)
Scorecard

Bahawalpur; 158 (19.5 overs)	v	Faisalabad; 164/4 (17.5 overs)
Faizan Zafar 36 (27); Zaman Khan 3/30 (3.5 overs)		Atiq-ur-Rehman 94 (51); Mohammad Basit 3/23 (4 overs)

Faisalabad won by 6 wickets
Imran Khan Cricket Stadium, Peshawar
Umpires: Imran Javed and Saqib Khan
Player of the match: Atiq-ur-Rehman (Bahawalpur)

- Bahawalpur won the toss and elected to field.

Group A
11 March 2026
21:15 (N)
Scorecard

Karachi Whites	v	Peshawar

No result
Imran Khan Cricket Stadium, Peshawar
Umpires: Imranullah Aslam and Abdul Muqeet

- No toss.
- No play was possible due to rain.

Group B
12 March 2026
16:15 (D/N)
Scorecard

Sialkot; 210/4 (20 overs)	v	Lahore Blues; 100 (14.2 overs)
Abdullah Shafique 57 (31); Mohammad Rizwan 2/26 (3 overs)		Hamza Zahoor 37 (23); Usama Mir 6/8 (3.2 overs)

Sialkot won by 110 runs
Imran Khan Cricket Stadium, Peshawar
Umpires: Nasir Hussain and Imtiaz Iqbal
Player of the match: Usama Mir (Sialkot)

- Lahore Blues won the toss and elected field.

Group B
12 March 2026
21:15 (N)
Scorecard

Multan; 201/6 (20 overs)	v	Karachi Blues; 127 (15.4 overs)
Imam-ul-Haq 71 (40); Shahnawaz Dahani 2/39 (4 overs)		Usman Khan 43 (23); Muhammad Ismail 3/25 (3 overs)

Multan won by 74 runs
Imran Khan Cricket Stadium, Peshawar
Umpires: Zulfiqar Jan and Tariq Rasheed
Player of the match: Imam-ul-Haq (Multan)

- Karachi Blues won the toss and elected to field.

Group A
13 March 2026
16:15 (D/N)
Scorecard

Faisalabad; 170/9 (20 overs)	v	Peshawar; 155 (19.5 overs)
Atiq-ur-Rehman 72 (44); Usman Tariq 2/20 (4 overs)		Israrullah 47 (40); Afaq Afridi 4/38 (3.5 overs)

Faisalabad won by 15 runs
Imran Khan Cricket Stadium, Peshawar
Umpires: Imran Javed and Saqib Khan
Player of the match: Atiq-ur-Rehman (Faisalabad)

- Peshawar won the toss and elected field.

Group A
13 March 2026
21:15 (N)
Scorecard

Lahore Whites; 196/5 (20 overs)	v	Bahawalpur; 198/6 (19.4 overs)
Mohammad Faiq 63 (42); Mohammad Sarwar 2/39 (4 overs)		Saad Khan 65 (30); Mohammad Rameez jnr 3/21 (4 overs)

Bahawalpur won by 4 wickets
Imran Khan Cricket Stadium, Peshawar
Umpires: Zulfiqar Jan and Mohammad Sajid
Player of the match: Haider Ali (Bahawalpur)

- Lahore Whites won the toss and elected bat.

Group B
14 March 2026
16:15 (D/N)
Scorecard

Sialkot; 202/6 (20 overs)	v	Abbottabad; 171 (20 overs)
Abdullah Shafique 96 (54); Shahab Khan 5/25 (4 overs)		Sajjad Ali 40 (37); Usama Mir 4/42 (4 overs)

Sialkot won by 31 runs
Imran Khan Cricket Stadium, Peshawar
Umpires: Khalid Mahmood and Tariq Rasheed
Player of the match: Abdullah Shafique (Sialkot)

- Abbottabad won the toss and elected to field.

Group B
14 March 2026
21:15 (N)
Scorecard

Karachi Blues; 206/3 (20 overs)	v	Lahore Blues; 149 (17.3 overs)
Saad Baig 72* (37); Mohammad Rizwan 2/23 (2 overs)		Saad Nasim 47 (33); Jahandad Khan 4/25 (3.3 overs)

Karachi Blues won by 57 runs
Imran Khan Cricket Stadium, Peshawar
Umpires: Nasir Hussain and Asif Yaqoob
Player of the match: Shahnawaz Dahani (Karachi Blues)

- Karachi Blues won the toss and elected to bat.
- Ali Hassan Baloch and Ali Raza (Lahore Blues) both made their T20 debut.

Group A
15 March 2026
16:15 (D/N)
Scorecard

Lahore Whites	v	Karachi Whites

Match abandoned
Imran Khan Cricket Stadium, Peshawar
Umpires: Zulfiqar Jan and Farooq Ali Khan

- No toss.
- No play was possible due to rain.

Group A
15 March 2026
21:15 (N)
Scorecard

Bahawalpur	v	Peshawar

Match abandoned
Imran Khan Cricket Stadium, Peshawar
Umpires: Imran Javed and Abdul Muqeet

- No toss.
- No play was possible due to rain.

Group B
16 March 2026
16:15 (D/N)
Scorecard

Lahore Blues; 86 (14.3 overs)	v	Abbottabad; 87/2 (8.2 overs)
Hamza Zahoor 18 (8); Shadab Khan 3/10 (3 overs)		Kamran Ghulam 46* (23); Mohammad Salman 1/8 (2 overs)

Abbottabad won by 8 wickets
Imran Khan Cricket Stadium, Peshawar
Umpires: Imtiaz Iqbal and Asif Yaqoob
Player of the match: Shadab Khan (Abbottabad)

- Lahore Blues won the toss and elected to bat.
- Asadullah, Shahrukh Ali (Lahore Blues) and Afaq Khan (Abbottabad) all made their T20 debuts.

Group B
16 March 2026
21:15 (N)
Scorecard

Multan; 163 (19.5 overs)	v	Sialkot; 164/3 (19.5 overs)
Imam-ul-Haq 86 (51); Usama Mir 2/29 (4 overs)		Hassan Nawaz 80* (53); Arafat Minhas 1/7 (4 overs)

Sialkot won by 7 wickets
Imran Khan Cricket Stadium, Peshawar
Umpires: Nasir Hussain and Ahsan Raza
Player of the match: Hassan Nawaz (Sialkot)

- Multan won the toss and elected to bat.

=== Knockout stage ===
Semi-final 1
17 March 2026
16:15 (D/N)
Scorecard

Sialkot; 165/9 (20 overs)	v	Karachi Whites; 167/5 (15.1 overs)
Hassan Nawaz 43 (33); Mohammad Umar 3/29 (4 overs)		Abdullah Fazal 88 41; Usama Mir 3/46 (4 overs)

Karachi Whites won by 5 wickets
Imran Khan Cricket Stadium, Peshawar
Umpires: Tariq Rasheed and Asif Yaqoob
Player of the match: Abdullah Fazal (Karachi Whites)

- Sialkot won the toss and elected to bat.

Semi-final 2
17 March 2026
21:15 (N)
Scorecard

Lahore Whites; 194/6 (20 overs)	v	Abbottabad
Imran Dogar 62 (31); Shahab Khan 4/28 (4 overs)

No result
Imran Khan Cricket Stadium, Peshawar
Umpires: Nasir Hussain and Ahsan Raza

- Abbottabad won the toss and elected to field.
- No further play was possible due to rain.
- Abbottabad advanced to the final as they finished top of Group B.

Final
7 June 2026 (Note: The final, was postponed due to adverse weather conditions.)
20:00 (N)
Scorecard

Karachi Whites; 118 (18.3 overs)	v	Abbottabad; 120/1 (13.5 overs)
Saqib Khan 22 (22); Arshad Iqbal 3/28 (4 overs)		Shahzaib Khan 54* (41); Rizwanullah 1/29 (3 overs)

Abbottabad won by 9 wickets
Gaddafi Stadium, Lahore
Umpires: Rashid Riaz and Asif Yaqoob

- Abbottabad won the toss and elected to field.
- The match was postponed to 7 June 2026 due to adverse weather conditions.
