= List of Pakistan Telecommunication Company Limited cricketers =

List of cricketers

This is a list of all cricketers who have played first-class or List A matches for Pakistan Telecommunication Company Limited cricket team. The team played nineteen first-class matches and fourteen List A matches between 2003 and 2006. Seasons given are first and last seasons; the player did not necessarily play in all the intervening seasons.

== Notable players ==
- Aamer Bashir, 2004/05-2005/06
- Adnan Naved, 2003/04-2004/05
- Ameer Khan, 2001/02-2003/04
- Aqeel Arshad, 2004/05
- Aqeel Mukhtar, 2001/02-2003/04
- Ashar Zaidi, 2001/02-2005/06
- Asim Kamal, 2002/03-2005/06
- Babar Naeem, 2002/03-2005/06
- Irfan Haider, 2001/02-2004/05
- Jawad Hameed, 2001/02-2005/06
- Mohammad Boota, 2004/05-2005/06
- Mohammad Fayyaz, 2003/04-2005/06
- Mohammad Hussain, 2002/03-2005/06
- Mohammad Khalil, 2002/03-2005/06
- Nauman Habib, 2003/04
- Naved Latif, 2003/04-2004/05
- Riaz Afridi, 2002/03-2005/06
- Shahid Hameed, 2005/06
- Shehzad Malik, 2003/04-2005/06
- Sheraz Khalid, 2003/04-2004/05
- Tabish Nawab, 2003/04-2004/05
- Tahir Mughal, 2005/06
- Usman Ali, 2004/05
- Usman Tariq, 2005/06
- Waqar Ahmed, 2003/04-2005/06
- Yasin Bari, 2001/02-2005/06
- Yasir Ali, 2004/05
- Zulqarnain Haider, 2001/02-2005/06
