= 2024–25 National T20 Cup =

Cricket tournament in Pakistan

- Dates: 14 – 27 March 2025
- Administrator: Pakistan Cricket Board
- Cricket format: Twenty20
- Tournament format(s): Group stage and knockout
- Host: Pakistan
- Champions: Lahore Blues (2nd title)
- Runners-up: Peshawar
- Participants: 18
- Matches: 39
- Player of the series: Sahibzada Farhan (Peshawar)
- Most runs: Sahibzada Farhan (605)
- Most wickets: Hasan Ali (13)
- Official website: National T20 Cup

The 2024–25 National T20 Cup was a Twenty20 domestic cricket competition played in Pakistan. It was the 21st season of the National T20 Cup, with the tournament starting on 14 March 2024 and the final being played on 27 March 2025. Karachi Whites were the defending champions as winners of the 2023–24 edition.

Lahore Blues won their second title beating Peshawar in the final by 9 wickets.

== Format ==
The 18 qualifying teams were divided into four groups (with Group A and Group B consisting of five teams and Group C and Group D consisting of four teams), with the top two teams in each group advancing to the Quarter finals. In this stage, the top four teams will qualified for the semi-finals.

== Teams ==
Group A	Group B	Group C	Group D
Karachi Blues; Lahore Whites; Larkana; Peshawar; Quetta	Bahawalpur; Dera Murad Jamali; Islamabad; Karachi Whites; Lahore Blues	Abbottabad; Faisalabad; Hyderabad; Rawalpindi	Azad Jammu & Kashmir; FATA; Multan; Sialkot

== Points table ==
The group stage consist of four groups. Group A and Group B have five teams, where Group C and Group D have four teams. Group stage is played in a single round-robin format. The top two teams in each group progress to the knockout stage.

=== Group A ===
Pos	Team	Pld	W	L	T	NR	Pts	NRR	Qualification
1	Lahore Whites	4	3	1	0	0	6	2.962	Advanced to the knockout stage and also qualified for 2025–26 National T20 Cup
2	Peshawar	4	3	1	0	0	6	2.423	Advanced to the knockout stage and also qualified for 2025–26 National T20 Cup
3	Karachi Blues	4	3	1	0	0	6	1.133	Relegated to National T20 Cup Qualifier
4	Quetta	4	1	3	0	0	2	−3.045	Relegated to National T20 Cup Qualifier
5	Larkana	4	0	4	0	0	0	−3.363	Relegated to National T20 Cup Qualifier

Source: ESPNcricinfo

==== Fixtures ====
15 March 2025 (N)
Scorecard

Lahore Whites; 181/3 (20 overs)	v	Peshawar; 182/2 (18.4 overs)

Peshawar won by 8 wickets
Iqbal Stadium, Faisalabad

- Lahore Whites won the toss and elected to bat.

15 March 2025 (N)
Scorecard

Larkana; 141/7 (20 overs)	v	Karachi Blues; 142/0 (14 overs)

Karachi Blues won by 10 wickets
Iqbal Stadium, Faisalabad

- Larkana won the toss and elected to bat.

17 March 2025 (N)
Scorecard

Quetta; 138/9 (20 overs)	v	Karachi Blues; 140/3 (16.4 overs)

Karachi Blues won by 7 wickets
Iqbal Stadium, Faisalabad

- Karachi Blues won the toss and elected to field.

17 March 2025 (N)
Scorecard

Lahore Whites; 215/4 (20 overs)	v	Larkana; 81 (17.5 overs)

Lahore Whites won by 134 runs
Iqbal Stadium, Faisalabad

- Lahore Whites won the toss and elected to bat.

19 March 2025 (D/N)
Scorecard

Quetta; 129/7 (20 overs)	v	Larkana; 114/7 (20 overs)

Quetta won by 15 runs
Multan Cricket Stadium, Multan

- Quetta won the toss and elected to bat.

19 March 2025 (N)
Scorecard

Karachi Blues; 183/3 (20 overs)	v	Peshawar; 167/9 (20 overs)

Karachi Blues won by 16 runs
Multan Cricket Stadium, Multan

- Peshawar won the toss and elected to field.

20 March 2025 (D/N)
Scorecard

Larkana; 131/9 (20 overs)	v	Peshawar; 132/3 (13.1 overs)

Peshawar won by 7 wickets
Multan Cricket Stadium, Multan

- Larkana won the toss and elected to bat.

20 March 2025 (N)
Scorecard

Quetta; 86/7 (20 overs)	v	Lahore Whites; 88/0 (8.5 overs)

Lahore Whites won by 10 wickets
Multan Cricket Stadium, Multan

- Quetta won the toss and elected to bat.

21 March 2025 (D/N)
Scorecard

Lahore Whites; 146/8 (20 overs)	v	Karachi Blues; 138/9 (20 overs)

Lahore Whites won by 8 runs
Multan Cricket Stadium, Multan

- Karachi Blues won the toss and elected to field.

21 March 2025 (N)
Scorecard

Peshawar; 239/1 (20 overs)	v	Quetta; 113 (19.3 overs)

Peshawar won by 126 runs
Multan Cricket Stadium, Multan

- Quetta won the toss and elected to field.

=== Group B ===
Pos	Team	Pld	W	L	NR	Pts	NRR	Qualification
1	Karachi Whites	4	4	0	0	8	1.475	Advanced to the knockout stage and also qualified for 2025–26 National T20 Cup
2	Lahore Blues	4	3	1	0	6	1.372	Advanced to the knockout stage and also qualified for 2025–26 National T20 Cup
3	Islamabad	4	2	2	0	4	0.740	Relegated to National T20 Cup Qualifier
4	Bahawalpur	4	1	3	0	2	−1.202	Relegated to National T20 Cup Qualifier
5	Dera Murad Jamali	4	0	4	0	0	−3.119	Relegated to National T20 Cup Qualifier

Source: ESPNcricinfo

==== Fixtures ====
14 March 2025 (N)
Scorecard

Karachi Whites; 159/6 (20 overs)	v	Islamabad; 73/5 (13.1 overs)

Karachi Whites won by 30 runs (D/L method)
Iqbal Stadium, Faisalabad

- Karachi Whites won the toss and elected to bat.

14 March 2025 (N)
Scorecard

Bahawalpur; 95/3 (7 overs)	v	Dera Murad Jamali; 34/6 (7 overs)

Bahawalpur won by 61 runs
Iqbal Stadium, Faisalabad

- Bahawalpur won the toss and elected to bat.

16 March 2025 (N)
Scorecard

Bahawalpur; 97 (18.2 overs)	v	Lahore Blues; 98/1 (9.4 overs)

Lahore Blues won by 9 wickets
Iqbal Stadium, Faisalabad

- Bahawalpur won the toss and elected to bat.

16 March 2025 (N)
Scorecard

Dera Murad Jamali; 132/7 (20 overs)	v	Karachi Whites; 135/4 (17.3 overs)

Karachi Whites won by 6 wickets
Iqbal Stadium, Faisalabad

- Dera Murad Jamali won the toss and elected to bat.

18 March 2025 (D/N)
Scorecard

Karachi Whites; 171/5 (20 overs)	v	Lahore Blues; 134 (18.5 overs)

Karachi Whites won by 37 runs
Gaddafi Stadium, Lahore

- Lahore Blues won the toss and elected to field.

18 March 2025 (N)
Scorecard

Islamabad; 184/7 (20 overs)	v	Dera Murad Jamali; 116/6 (20 overs)

Islamabad won by 68 runs
Gaddafi Stadium, Lahore

- Islamabad won the toss and elected to bat.

19 March 2025 (D/N)
Scorecard

Islamabad; 166/4 (20 overs)	v	Bahawalpur; 130 (19.3 overs)

Islamabad won by 36 runs
Gaddafi Stadium, Lahore

- Bahawalpur won the toss and elected to field.

19 March 2025 (N)
Scorecard

Dera Murad Jamali; 100/8 (20 overs)	v	Lahore Blues; 102/2 (14 overs)

Lahore Blues won by 8 wickets
Gaddafi Stadium, Lahore

- Dera Murad Jamali won the toss and elected to bat.

21 March 2025 (N)
Scorecard

Karachi Whites; 182/5 (20 overs)	v	Bahawalpur; 165/5 (20 overs)

Karachi Whites won by 17 runs
Iqbal Stadium, Faisalabad

- Bahawalpur won the toss and elected to field.

21 March 2025 (N)
Scorecard

Islamabad; 118/9 (20 overs)	v	Lahore Blues; 119/3 (17.1 overs)

Lahore Blues won by 7 wickets
Iqbal Stadium, Faisalabad

- Islamabad won the toss and elected to bat.

=== Group C ===
Pos	Team	Pld	W	L	T	NR	Pts	NRR	Qualification
1	Faisalabad	3	2	1	0	0	4	0.947	Advanced to the knockout stage and also qualified for 2025–26 National T20 Cup
2	Abbottabad	3	2	1	0	0	4	0.660	Advanced to the knockout stage and also qualified for 2025–26 National T20 Cup
3	Rawalpindi	3	1	2	0	0	2	0.160	Relegated to National T20 Cup Qualifier
4	Hyderabad	3	1	2	0	0	2	−1.863	Relegated to National T20 Cup Qualifier

Source: ESPNcricinfo

==== Fixtures ====
16 March 2025 (D/N)
Scorecard

Rawalpindi; 104 (18.3 overs)	v	Abbottabad; 105/3 (13.1 overs)

Abbottabad won by 7 wickets
Multan Cricket Stadium, Multan

- Abbottabad won the toss and elected to field.

16 March 2025 (N)
Scorecard

Faisalabad; 199/4 (20 overs)	v	Hyderabad; 137/8 (20 overs)

Faisalabad won by 62 runs
Multan Cricket Stadium, Multan

- Hyderabad won the toss and elected to field.

18 March 2025 (N)
Scorecard

Faisalabad; 207/3 (20 overs)	v	Rawalpindi; 183 (19.2 overs)

Faisalabad won by 24 runs
Iqbal Stadium, Faisalabad

- Faisalabad won the toss and elected to bat.

18 March 2025 (N)
Scorecard

Abbottabad; 127 (19.3 overs)	v	Hyderabad; 131/3 (14.5 overs)

Hyderabad won by 7 wickets
Iqbal Stadium, Faisalabad

- Abbottabad won the toss and elected to bat.

19 March 2025 (N)
Scorecard

Faisalabad; 134 (19.4 overs)	v	Abbottabad; 135/2 (16.3 overs)

Abbottabad won by 8 wickets
Iqbal Stadium, Faisalabad

- Faisalabad won the toss and elected to bat.

19 March 2025 (N)
Scorecard

Rawalpindi; 218/3 (20 overs)	v	Hyderabad; 127 (17.2 overs)

Rawalpindi won by 91 runs
Iqbal Stadium, Faisalabad

- Rawalpindi won the toss and elected to bat.

=== Group D ===
Pos	Team	Pld	W	L	NR	Pts	NRR	Qualification
1	Sialkot	3	3	0	0	6	1.780	Advanced to the knockout stage and also qualified for 2025–26 National T20 Cup
2	Multan	3	2	1	0	4	1.456	Advanced to the knockout stage and also qualified for 2025–26 National T20 Cup
3	FATA	3	1	2	0	2	−1.648	Relegated to National T20 Cup Qualifier
4	AJK	3	0	3	0	0	−1.800	Relegated to National T20 Cup Qualifier

Source: ESPNcricinfo

==== Fixtures ====
17 March 2025 (D/N)
Scorecard

AJK; 149 (20 overs)	v	FATA; 154/6 (17.1 overs)

FATA won by 4 wickets
Gaddafi Stadium, Lahore

- AJK won the toss and elected to bat.

17 March 2025 (N)
Scorecard

Multan; 147/8 (20 overs)	v	Sialkot; 148/7 (19.3 overs)

Sialkot won by 3 wickets
Gaddafi Stadium, Lahore

- Sialkot won the toss and elected to field.

18 March 2025 (D/N)
Scorecard

AJK; 164/8 (20 overs)	v	Multan; 168/5 (18.2 overs)

Multan won by 5 wickets
Lahore City Cricket Association Ground, Lahore

- AJK won the toss and elected to bat.

18 March 2025 (N)
Scorecard

FATA; 107 (18.1 overs)	v	Sialkot; 110/3 (14.2 overs)

Sialkot won by 7 wickets
Lahore City Cricket Association Ground, Lahore

- Sialkot won the toss and elected to field.

20 March 2025 (N)
Scorecard

Multan; 167/7 (20 overs)	v	FATA; 93 (17.2 overs)

Multan won by 74 runs
Iqbal Stadium, Faisalabad

- Multan won the toss and elected to bat.

20 March 2025 (N)
Scorecard

AJK; 137/6 (20 overs)	v	Sialkot; 143/2 (14.3 overs)

Sialkot won by 8 wickets
Iqbal Stadium, Faisalabad

- AJK won the toss and elected to bat.

== Knockout stage ==
=== Bracket ===
Quarter-finals
A1	Lahore Whites	130/5 (20)
C2	Abbottabad	131/4 (17.5)
C1	Faisalabad	138/7 (20)
A2	Peshawar	140/7 (19.2)
B1	Karachi Whites	148/8 (20)
D2	Multan	155/9 (20)
D1	Sialkot	151 (18.5)
B2	Lahore Blues	184 (20)

Semi-finals
QF1	Abbottabad	187/8 (20)
QF3	Peshawar	243/3 (20)
QF2	Multan	161/7 (20)
QF4	Lahore Blues	166/4 (20)

Final
SF1	Peshawar	110/9 (20)
SF2	Lahore Blues	111/1 (16)

=== Quarter-finals ===
Quarter-final 1
23 March 2025
19:15 (N)
Scorecard

Lahore Whites; 130/5 (20 overs)	v	Abbottabad; 131/4 (17.5 overs)
Muhammad Akhlaq 59 (49); Khalid Usman 2/15 (4 overs)		Kamran Ghulam 58* (41); Mohammad Salman 1/14 (2 overs)

Abbottabad won by 6 wickets
Iqbal Stadium, Faisalabad
Umpires: Zulfiqar Jan and Asif Yaqoob
Player of the match: Kamran Ghulam (Abbottabad)

- Abbottabad won the toss and elected to field.
- Azeem Dar and Zain Bin Farooq (Lahore Whites) both made their T20 debuts.

Quarter-final 2
23 March 2025
23:15 (N)
Scorecard

Multan; 155/9 (20 overs)	v	Karachi Whites; 148/8 (20 overs)
Zeeshan Ashraf 60 (34); Haroon Arshad 2/21 (3 overs)		Haroon Arshad 42 (29); Muhammad Ismail 3/34 (4 overs)

Multan won by 7 runs
Iqbal Stadium, Faisalabad
Umpires: Faisal Afridi and Tariq Rasheed
Player of the match: Zeeshan Ashraf (Multan)

- Multan won the toss and elected to bat.

Quarter-final 3
24 March 2025
19:15 (N)
Scorecard

Faisalabad; 138/7 (20 overs)	v	Peshawar; 140/7 (19.2 overs)
Ali Shan 51 (39); Mohammad Amri Khan 3/25 (4 overs)		Israrullah 30 (27); Ahmed Safi Abdullah 3/20 (4 overs)

Peshawar won by 3 wickets
Iqbal Stadium, Faisalabad
Umpires: Rashid Riaz and Asif Yaqoob
Player of the match: Mohammad Amri Khan (Peshawar)

- Faisalabad won the toss and elected to bat.

Quarter-final 4
24 March 2025
23:15 (N)
Scorecard

Lahore Blues; 184 (20 overs)	v	Sialkot; 151 (18.5 overs)
Umar Siddiq 65 (44); Hasan Ali 4/42 (4 overs)		Mirza Baig 77 (47); Hussain Talat 2/25 (3 overs)

Lahore Blues won by 33 runs
Iqbal Stadium, Faisalabad
Umpires: Nasir Hussain and Zulfiqar Jan
Player of the match: Umar Siddiq (Lahore Blues)

- Siakot won the toss and elected to field.
- Farhan Yousaf (Lahore Blues) made his T20 debut.

=== Semi-finals ===
Semi-final 1
26 March 2025
19:15 (N)
Scorecard

Peshawar; 243/3 (20 overs)	v	Abbottabad; 187/8 (20 overs)
Sahibzada Farhan 148 (72); Yasir Shah 1/29 (4 overs)		Shahzaib Khan 53 (43); Mohammad Imran 2/22 (4 overs)

Peshawar won by 56 runa
Iqbal Stadium, Faisalabad
Umpires: Faisal Afridi and Asif Yaqoob
Player of the match: Sahibzada Farhan (Peshawar)

- Abbottabad won the toss and elected to field.

Semi-final 2
26 March 2025
23:15 (N)
Scorecard

Lahore Blues; 166/4 (20 overs)	v	Multan; 161/7 (20 overs)
Imran Butt 89* (56); Muhammad Shahzad 1/8 (1 over)		Zain Abbas 45 (37); Nisar Ahmad 2/27 (4 overs)

Lahore Blues won by 5 runs
Iqbal Stadium, Faisalabad
Umpires: Ahsan Raza and Rashid Riaz
Player of the match: Imran Butt (Lahore Blues)

- Lahore Blues won the toss and elected to bat.

=== Final ===
Final
27 March 2025
19:30 (N)
Scorecard

Peshawar; 110/9 (20 overs)	v	Lahore Blues; 111/1 (16 overs)
Iftikhar Ahmed 34 (33); Salman Mirza 4/21 (4 overs)		Umar Siddiq 64 (46); Usman Tariq 1/20 (4 overs)

Lahore Blues won by 9 wickets
Iqbal Stadium, Faisalabad
Umpires: Ahsan Raza and Asif Yaqoob
Player of the match: Salman Mirza (Lahore Blues)

- Peshawar won the toss and elected to bat.
