= Haroon Arshad (Pakistani cricketer) =

Pakistani cricketer

Personal information
- Born: 31 October 2005 (age 21); Karachi, Sindh, Pakistan
- Batting: Right-handed
- Role: Batsman

Domestic team information
- Years: Team
- 2025–present: Karachi Whites
- 2026–present: Karachi Kings

Career statistics
Competition	Twenty20
Matches	3
Runs scored	107
Batting average	53.50
100s/50s	0/0
Top score	44
Balls bowled	36
Wickets	2
Bowling average	17.00
5 wickets in innings	0
10 wickets in match	0
Best bowling	2/21
Catches/stumpings	2/–
- Source: ESPNcricinfo, 25 March 2025

Haroon Arshad (born 31 October 2005) is a Pakistani cricketer, who is a right-handed batsman. He grew up in Karachi and represented Pakistan under-19 cricket team. He plays for Karachi in domestic cricket. He made his Twenty20 debut for Karachi Whites on 16 March 2025, against Dera Murad Jamali in the 2024–25 National T20 Cup.
