= Khurram Shehzad (cricketer, born 1982) =

Pakistani cricketer

Personal information
- Full name: Khurram Shehzad
- Born: 19 January 1982 (age 44); Faisalabad, Punjab, Pakistan
- Batting: Right-handed
- Bowling: Right-arm off break
- Role: Batting all-rounder

Domestic team information
- Years: Team
- Faisalabad
- Faisalabad Wolves
- North West Frontier Province
- Punjab
- Service Industries
- Sui Northern Gas Pipelines Limited

Career statistics
Competition	First-class	List A	Twenty20
Matches	110	99	80
Runs scored	5,168	2,416	1,209
Batting average	32.30	29.46	19.81
100s/50s	12/21	0/15	0/3
Top score	166	87*	65
Balls bowled	1,970	1,908	730
Wickets	25	53	39
Bowling average	43.16	29.88	18.84
5 wickets in innings	0	0	0
10 wickets in match	0	0	0
Best bowling	3/75	3/22	4/20
Catches/stumpings	95/–	40/–	33/–
- Source: Cricinfo, 14 April 2026

Khurram Shehzad (born 19 January 1982) is a Pakistani former cricketer. Shehzad was a right-handed batsman who bowled right-arm off break. He was born in Faisalabad, Punjab.

Shehzad played Pakistani domestic cricket for Faisalabad, Punjab, North West Frontier Province, Sui Northern Gas Pipelines Limited, Service Industries and Attock Group. In limited-overs cricket, he represented Faisalabad Wolves and North West Frontier Province Panthers. In September 2013, he was named in the Faisalabad Wolves squad for the 2013 Champions League Twenty20.

One of Shehzad's most notable first-class innings came in the Bottom Six Teams final of the 2012–13 Quaid-e-Azam Trophy, when he scored 117 against Bahawalpur to put Faisalabad in a strong position. In March 2013, he also starred with the ball for Faisalabad Wolves in the 2012–13 Super Eight T20 Cup, taking a career-best 4 for 20 against Bahawalpur Stags and being named player of the match. During the 2013–14 National T20 Cup, he took 2 wickets for 7 runs and then scored 27 from 24 balls as Faisalabad Wolves defeated Lahore Eagles by seven wickets.

Four years later, in the final of the 2016–17 Quaid-e-Azam Trophy Grade II, Shehzad made 70 from 37 balls in support of Misbah-ul-Haq's 94 as Faisalabad took a decisive first-innings lead over Multan. Faisalabad went on to win the match by nine wickets and regain first-class status.

Shehzad played 110 first-class matches in which he has scored 5,168 runs at a batting average of 32.30 and scored 21 half-centuries and 12 centuries. His highest score was 166.
