= Waqar Ahmed (cricketer, born 1980) =

Pakistani cricketer (born 1980)

Personal information
- Full name: Waqar Ahmed
- Born: 1 April 1980 (age 46); Peshawar, North-West Frontier Province, Pakistan
- Batting: Left-handed
- Bowling: Left-arm fast-medium
- Role: Bowler

Domestic team information
- Years: Team
- Peshawar
- Peshawar Panthers
- Pakistan Customs
- Water and Power Development Authority
- North West Frontier Province
- Pakistan Telecommunication Company Limited
- Sui Southern Gas Corporation
- Pakistan Television

Career statistics
Competition	First-class	List A	Twenty20
Matches	103	51	12
Runs scored	1,247	247	16
Batting average	10.56	10.29	4.00
100s/50s	0/0	0/0	0/0
Top score	47	41	8
Balls bowled	17,064	2,089	246
Wickets	408	64	14
Bowling average	24.11	29.39	26.14
5 wickets in innings	26	0	0
10 wickets in match	5	0	0
Best bowling	8/96	4/26	3/28
Catches/stumpings	21/–	7/–	0/–
- Source: Cricinfo, 3 May 2026

Waqar Ahmed (born 1 April 1980) is a Pakistani former cricketer. Ahmed was a left-handed batsman who bowled left-arm fast-medium. He was born in Peshawar, North-West Frontier Province, and played domestic cricket in Pakistan for Peshawar, Pakistan Customs, Water and Power Development Authority, North West Frontier Province, Pakistan Telecommunication Company Limited, Sui Southern Gas Corporation, Pakistan Television and Peshawar Panthers.

Ahmed made his first-class debut in the 1997–98 Quaid-e-Azam Trophy, and went on to build a long domestic career as a left-arm seamer.

One of Ahmed's notable performances came for North West Frontier Province in the 2007–08 Pentangular Cup, when he took 4 for 76 in the second innings against Baluchistan as NWFP completed an innings-and-11-run victory after a massive first-innings total built around a triple-century from Yasir Hameed.

His finest spell for Peshawar came in the 2011–12 Quaid-e-Azam Trophy Division Two, when he took seven wickets in the second innings against Sui Northern Gas Pipelines Limited after already claiming two in the first, finishing with 11 wickets in the match as Peshawar won by 42 runs at Arbab Niaz Stadium. A month later, again for Peshawar, he produced the best bowling figures of his first-class career, taking 8 for 96 against Quetta as Peshawar completed their eighth win of the season and finished the league stage on top.

Late in his career, playing for Pakistan Television in the 2014–15 Quaid-e-Azam Trophy Silver League, Ahmed took 6 for 38 in the second innings against Quetta Bears, helping Pakistan Television to an innings-and-62-run win. In the quarter-final of the same competition, he took 5 for 53 in the first innings against Sui Southern Gas Corporation, although Pakistan Television eventually lost by 235 runs.

Overall, Ahmed played in 103 first-class matches, taking 408 wickets at a bowling average of 24.11, with 26 five-wicket hauls and five ten-wicket matches. In List A cricket, he took 64 wickets in 51 matches, with best figures of 4 for 26, while in 12 Twenty20 matches he took 14 wickets with best figures of 3 for 28. As a lower-order batsman, he scored 1,247 first-class runs with a top score of 47.
