= Mohammad Hasan (cricketer) =

Pakistani cricketer (born 1990)

Personal information
- Born: 4 October 1990 (age 36); Karachi, Sindh, Pakistan
- Batting: Right-handed
- Role: Wicket-keeper

Domestic team information
- Years: Team
- 2007/08: Pakistan Customs
- 2012–2017: Karachi
- 2018: Islamabad United
- 2019–2023: Sindh (squad no. 16)

Career statistics
Competition	First-class	List A	Twenty20
Matches	110	87	26
Runs scored	4,408	1,381	120
Batting average	29.38	25.57	12.00
100s/50s	7/18	1/2	0/0
Top score	251*	131*	41*
Balls bowled	6	–	–
Wickets	0	–	–
Bowling average	–	–	–
5 wickets in innings	0	–	–
10 wickets in match	0	–	–
Best bowling	–	–	–
Catches/stumpings	346/21	92/21	12/10
- Source: Cricinfo, 14 April 2026

Mohammad Hasan (born 4 October 1990) is a Pakistani former cricketer. Hasan was a right-handed batsman and wicket-keeper. He was born in Karachi, Sindh.

Hasan represented Pakistan Under-19s before making his first-class debut for Pakistan Customs against Habib Bank Limited in the 2007–08 Quaid-e-Azam Trophy. He made his List A debut for Pakistan Customs against National Bank of Pakistan in the 2007–08 ABN-AMRO Cup, and his Twenty20 debut for Karachi Zebras against Faisalabad Wolves in the 2011–12 Faysal Bank Super Eight T-20 Cup. He later played first-class cricket for Karachi Whites and Sindh, limited-overs cricket for Karachi Dolphins and Sindh, and franchise cricket for Islamabad United in the Pakistan Super League. In April 2018, he was named in Khyber Pakhtunkhwa's squad for the 2018 Pakistan Cup, and the following year he was named in Sindh's squads for the 2019 Pakistan Cup and the 2019–20 Quaid-e-Azam Trophy. His last first-class appearance came for Karachi Whites against Federally Administered Tribal Areas in the 2023–24 Quaid-e-Azam Trophy.

One of Hasan's breakthrough performances came in the 2011–12 Quaid-e-Azam Trophy, when he and Behram Khan rescued Karachi Whites from 86 for 4 against Lahore Shalimar with an unbroken fifth-wicket stand of 201; Hasan ended the opening day unbeaten on 122. He followed it the next day with an unbeaten 251, then the first-class century of his career and still his highest first-class score. In January 2015, he struck an unbeaten 131 for Karachi Dolphins against Zarai Taraqiati Bank Limited in a seven-wicket one-day win. In June 2016, playing for Pakistan A against Yorkshire at Headingley, he scored 98 and shared an eighth-wicket stand of 90 with Hasan Ali.

Hasan continued to score heavily in domestic first-class cricket. In September 2018, he made 125 for Karachi Whites against Sui Southern Gas Company, sharing a fifth-wicket partnership of 204 with Khurram Manzoor. In December 2020, he made 111 for Sindh against Southern Punjab after arriving at the crease with his side at 38 for 5, adding 173 with Saad Ali.
