= Aamer Bashir =

Pakistani cricketer (1972–2010)

Personal information
- Born: 23 February 1972; Multan, Punjab, Pakistan
- Died: 20 December 2010 (aged 38); Multan, Punjab, Pakistan
- Batting: Right-handed
- Role: Batsman

Domestic team information
- Years: Team
- 1989–2004: Multan
- 1992–1997: United Bank Limited
- 2005–2006: Pakistan Telecommunication Company Limited
- 2006–2009: Zarai Taraqiati Bank Limited
- Source: ESPNCricinfo

Aamer Bashir (Urdu: عامر بشیر; 23 February 1972 – 20 December 2010) was a Pakistani first-class cricketer.

== Cricket career ==
He debuted in the 1989/90 season. He was a right-handed batsman who made over 8,000 runs in his career. For many years he was on the fringes of selection for Pakistan, but the closest he got to playing for his country was selection to the squad for a One Day International against India in 2005. Played as Professional for Hollinwood C C and Uppermill CC in the UK.

== Death ==
Bashir died on 20 December 2010 following a long battle with stomach cancer. He was 38 years old.
