= Waqas Ahmed (cricketer, born 1989) =

Pakistani cricketer

Personal information
- Full name: Waqas Ahmed
- Born: 22 February 1989 (age 37); Sialkot, Punjab, Pakistan
- Batting: Right-handed
- Bowling: Right-arm fast
- Role: Bowler

Domestic team information
- Years: Team
- Sialkot
- State Bank of Pakistan
- Pakistan Television
- Lahore Blues
- Northern

Career statistics
Competition	First-class	List A	Twenty20
Matches	60	19	4
Runs scored	445	79	–
Batting average	6.95	8.77	–
100s/50s	0/1	0/0	–/–
Top score	53	12	–
Balls bowled	10,505	866	78
Wickets	226	25	4
Bowling average	27.07	32.52	26.75
5 wickets in innings	12	0	0
10 wickets in match	3	0	0
Best bowling	7/37	3/29	2/27
Catches/stumpings	15/–	3/–	0/–
- Source: Cricinfo, 29 April 2026

Waqas Ahmed (born 22 February 1989) is a Pakistani former cricketer. Ahmed was a right-arm fast bowler. He was born in Sialkot, Punjab.

Ahmed made his List A debut for Sialkot Stallions against Faisalabad Wolves in the 2008–09 Royal Bank of Scotland Cup on 27 March 2009. He made his first-class debut for Sialkot against Habib Bank Limited in the 2010–11 Quaid-e-Azam Trophy on 10 November 2010. He later made his Twenty20 debut for Lahore Blues against Peshawar in the 2017–18 National T20 Cup on 18 November 2017.

During his domestic career, Ahmed represented Sialkot, Sialkot Stallions, State Bank of Pakistan, Pakistan Television, Northern and Lahore Blues, while the Pakistan Cricket Board also lists Pakistan A, Omar Associates, Brighto Paints, Ghani Glass and Medicam Group among his teams. In October 2018, he played for Pakistan A against New Zealand A in Dubai, taking three wickets in the match.

In only his fourth first-class match, Ahmed took 7 for 55 against Multan in the 2010–11 Quaid-e-Azam Trophy, helping Sialkot take control of the match. In December 2019, playing for Northern against Khyber Pakhtunkhwa, he took 5 for 51 in the 2019–20 Quaid-e-Azam Trophy. In 2018, he took 52 wickets in the Quaid-e-Azam Trophy season and finished as the tournament's second-most successful bowler.
