= Salman Khan (Pakistani cricketer) =

Pakistani cricketer

Personal information
- Full name: Salman Haider Khan
- Born: 4 June 1971 (age 55); Rawalpindi, Punjab, Pakistan
- Batting: Right-handed
- Bowling: Right-arm medium

Domestic team information
- Years: Team
- 1998–2001: Oxford University
- 2000: Oxford Universities
- 2001: Oxford UCCE

Career statistics
Competition	First-class
Matches	17
Runs scored	266
Batting average	19.00
100s/50s	–/1
Top score	87
Balls bowled	2,668
Wickets	21
Bowling average	70.71
5 wickets in innings	–
10 wickets in match	–
Best bowling	3/70
Catches/stumpings	5/–
- Source: Cricinfo, 1 July 2020

Salman Haider Khan (born 4 June 1971) is a Pakistani former first-class cricketer.

Khan was born at Rawalpindi in June 1971. He later studied in England, firstly studying economics at University College London, before studying for his masters degree at the University of Cambridge. From Cambridge, he went to Wadham College at the University of Oxford to study for his doctorate. Khan played first-class cricket while studying at Oxford, making his debut in first-class cricket for Oxford University against Worcestershire at Oxford in 1998. He played first-class cricket for Oxford until 2001, making twelve appearances. He scored 122 runs in his twelve matches for Oxford, with a high score of 34. With his right-arm medium pace bowling he had 14 wickets at a high average of 73.92, with best figures of 3 for 70.

In addition to playing first-class cricket for Oxford University, Khan also made four first-class appearances for a combined Oxford Universities cricket team in 2000. Playing for Oxford Universities against Northamptonshire, Khan came to the crease with Oxford Universities 87 for 9 in their first-innings and requiring 34 more runs to avoid the follow-on. Alongside Alan Gofton, he scored 87 runs in a tenth wicket stand of 134, which was the highest tenth wicket stand in England by June. Salman and Gofton's last wicket stand contributed to Oxford Universities winning by 3 wickets. The following year he made a single appearance for Oxford UCCE against Middlesex.
