= Niaz Khan =

- Born: 1970 (age 55–56); Pakistan
- Occupation: waiter
- Known for: Asserts he defected from al Qaeda's plans to attack civilian targets in the USA

Niaz Khan is a citizen of the United Kingdom, born in Pakistan, who asserts he defected from al Qaeda in 2000, and warned the FBI of al Qaeda's plans to attack civilian targets in the United States. Khan described growing disillusioned with his gambling debts and his job as a waiter. He describes being recruited to travel to Pakistan for training for jihad, outside a London gambling establishment, by a recruiter who offered to pay off his gambling debts.

He describes being trained just outside Lahore in how to hijack planes. His trainers had mockups of Boeing aircraft for the training. He was then to travel to New York City, in April 2000, to join a cell intending to attack civilian targets in the USA. However, he described having cold feet, and failing to meet his contact at the airport. He described gambling away all his contingency money. He described fearing punishment from his terrorist handlers. He approached the FBI and warned them that al Qaeda was planning to hijack planes to attack civilian targets in the USA. He was debriefed by the FBI for several weeks. Although he passed two lie detector tests, ultimately the FBI didn't believe him. The FBI sent him back to the UK, where he was interviewed by UK security officials, who didn't believe him either.

The Guardian quoted Khan's reaction to watching al Qaeda's attack on September 11, 2001.

I could not believe my own eyes. It was like everything I had said, everything I had been told by al-Qaeda. I was in no doubt. Same plan. Perhaps someone from the training camp was on board one of those planes. Perhaps, if I had not run away, I would have been there.

Khan was interviewed by NBC News in 2004, on national TV.

== See also ==
- 20th hijacker
