= Zulfiqar Jan =

Pakistani cricketer and umpire

Personal information
- Full name: Zulfiqar Jan
- Born: 10 November 1979 (age 47); Charsadda, North-West Frontier Province, Pakistan
- Batting: Right-handed
- Role: Wicket-keeper

Domestic team information
- Years: Team
- Peshawar
- North West Frontier Province
- Peshawar Panthers
- Khyber Pakhtunkhwa
- Khan Research Laboratories

Career statistics
Competition	First-class	List A	Twenty20
Matches	162	84	16
Runs scored	4,590	860	56
Batting average	22.83	23.24	18.66
100s/50s	4/19	0/3	0/0
Top score	120*	76	18*
Balls bowled	48	0
Wickets	0	0
Bowling average	–	–
5 wickets in innings	0	0
10 wickets in match	0	0
Best bowling	–	–
Catches/stumpings	570/24	99/17	10/3
- Source: Cricinfo, 29 April 2026

Zulfiqar Jan (born 10 November 1979) is a Pakistani cricket umpire and former cricketer. Jan was a right-handed batsman who played as a wicket-keeper. He was born in Charsadda, North-West Frontier Province.

Jan made his debut for Peshawar in a List A match against Islamabad in the 1999–00 Tissot Cup. He made his first-class debut for Peshawar in the 1999/00 season, and later represented North West Frontier Province, Peshawar Panthers, Khan Research Laboratories and Khyber Pakhtunkhwa in domestic cricket.

Jan made his Twenty20 debut for Peshawar Panthers against Multan Tigers in the 2005–06 ABN-AMRO Twenty-20 Cup on 28 February 2006. In April 2009, he was named in Pakistan's 30-man probable squad for the 2009 ICC World Twenty20, following the removal of players associated with the Indian Cricket League.

After his playing career, Jan became an umpire. He has officiated in first-class, List A and Twenty20 cricket. In 2024, the Pakistan Cricket Board appointed him to the panel of match officials for the Bahria Town Champions T20 Cup. In April 2026, he was among the officials for Pakistan's women's white-ball series against Zimbabwe.
