= Pakistan Telecommunication Company Limited cricket team =

Cricket team

The Pakistan Telecommunication Company Limited cricket team, sponsored by Pakistan Telecommunication Company Ltd, played first-class cricket in Pakistan from 2003–04 to 2005–06, competing in the Patron's Trophy.

== First-class playing record ==
Pakistan Telecommunication Company Limited played six matches in 2003–04, winning two and drawing four.

In 2004-05 they played five matches in the group stage, winning three, losing one and drawing one. They progressed to the semi-finals, losing on the first innings by 25 runs to Habib Bank Limited.

In 2005-06 they played four matches in the group stage, winning two and drawing two. They progressed to the quadrangular stage, where they were unable to win any of their three matches.

In all they played 19 matches, winning seven, losing three and drawing nine.

== Leading players ==
Azhar Zaidi played all 19 matches and scored the most runs, 1242 at an average of 46.00, and hit the highest score, 159, in an innings victory over Karachi Port Trust. Shehzad Malik scored 1198 runs in 18 matches at 54.45. The leading bowler was Riaz Afridi, who took 77 wickets at 22.54 in 15 matches, and also had the best figures, 7 for 78 against National Bank of Pakistan in 2005–06.

== List A cricket ==
Pakistan Telecommunication Company Limited also played List A matches from 2003 to 2006. They played 14 matches, winning eight and losing six.
