= North West Frontier Province cricket team =

Cricket team in British India (1937–1946)

Team information
- Founded: 1887
- Last match: 1946
- Home ground: Peshawar Club Ground, Peshawar

History
- First-class debut: Southern Punjab in 1937 at Baradari Ground, Patiala
- Ranji Trophy wins: 0

The North West Frontier Province cricket team was an Indian domestic cricket team representing the British Indian province of North-West Frontier Province. The team played in the Ranji Trophy from the 1937–1938 Indian cricket season until 1945–46 season in British India, before the partition of India.

The team first played first-class cricket in Ranji Trophy in the 1937 season against Southern Punjab team under the captaincy of Romilly Holdsworth. The team continued to appear in the Ranji Trophy until the 1945–1946 season when it played its final first-class match against Delhi.

Following independence and the partition of India, the NWFP team competed in various national competitions in Pakistan. In 2010, the province was renamed "Khyber Pakhtunkhwa", and the cricket team was renamed accordingly.
