= Dera Murad Jamali cricket team =

Cricket team

The Dera Murad Jamali cricket team is a cricket team based in Dera Murad Jamali, Balochistan, Pakistan. Beginning with the 2024–25 season, it participates in Pakistan's first-class, List A and Twenty20 competitions.

Captained by the former Test cricket player Imran Khan, but with seven players making their first-class debuts, Dera Murad Jamali won their inaugural first-class match in the 2024–25 Quaid-e-Azam Trophy, beating Lahore Blues by 119 runs. Danish Aziz made the team's first first-class century, top-scoring in each innings with 102 and 42, while Abu Huraira, on his first-class debut, took 3 for 50 and 5 for 48, Dera Murad Jamali's first five-wicket haul.
