= 2005–06 National Twenty20 Cup =

Cricket tournament

- Dates: 24 February – 4 March 2006
- Administrator: Pakistan Cricket Board
- Cricket format: Twenty20
- Tournament format(s): Round-robin and knockout
- Host: (Pakistan) Karachi
- Champions: Sialkot Stallions (1st title)
- Participants: 13
- Matches: 39

The 2005–06 ABN-AMRO Twenty-20 Cup was the second season of the ABN-AMRO Twenty-20 Cup in Pakistan, sponsored by ABN AMRO. It was held in Karachi from 24 February to 4 March 2006. This edition featured an expanded format, with the number of matches increased from 19 to 39 and the number of teams from 11 to 13; the new teams being the Islamabad Leopards and the Abbottabad Rhinos. The Sialkot Stallions won the tournament by defeating the defending champions Faisalabad Wolves in the final.

== Format ==
The 13 teams were divided into two groups: Pool A with seven teams and Pool B with six. Each group played a single round-robin tournament and the top two teams from each group advanced to the semi-finals. The winners of each group played the runners-up of the other group in the semi-finals. The winners of the semi-finals played the final.

Awarded points
Result	Points
Won	2 points
No result	1 point
Loss	0 points

The position of the teams in the points table is determined by:

- Total points
- Won
- Lost (fewest)
- Net run rate

== Results ==
=== Teams and standings ===
The top two teams from each group qualify for the semi-finals.

Pool A
Team	Pld	W	L	NR	Pts	NRR
Sialkot Stallions	6	6	0	0	12	+2.099
Faisalabad Wolves	6	4	2	0	8	+2.686
Lahore Eagles	6	3	3	0	6	+0.077
Peshawar Panthers	6	3	3	0	6	+0.003
Karachi Zebras	6	3	3	0	6	–1.431
Rawalpindi Rams	6	1	5	0	2	–1.438
Multan Tigers	6	1	5	0	2	–2.268

Pool B
Team	Pld	W	L	NR	Pts	NRR
Lahore Lions	5	5	0	0	10	+1.719
Karachi Dolphins	5	4	1	0	8	+0.871
Abbottabad Rhinos	5	2	3	0	4	+0.130
Hyderabad Hawks	5	2	3	0	4	–0.250
Islamabad Leopards	5	2	3	0	4	–0.492
Quetta Bears	5	0	5	0	0	–1.779

Qualified for semi-finals

=== Knockout stage ===
Semifinals
A1	Sialkot Stallions	198/8
B2	Karachi Dolphins	169/7
B1	Lahore Lions	149/9
A2	Faisalabad Wolves	150/4

Final
A1	Sialkot Stallions	156/4
A2	Faisalabad Wolves	152/8

== Fixtures ==
=== Group stage ===
==== Pool A ====
24 February
10:00
Scorecard

Sialkot Stallions; 203/7 (20 overs)	v	Lahore Eagles; 195/9 (20 overs)
Shoaib Malik 66 (40); Imran Farhat 3/31 (4 overs)		Imran Farhat 62 (37); Mohammad Asif 4/42 (4 overs)

Sialkot Stallions won by 8 runs
United Bank Limited Sports Complex, Karachi
Umpires: Afzaal Ahmed and Iqbal Butt

- Lahore Eagles won the toss and elected to field.
- Arsalan Mir, Humayun Farhat, Junaid Zia, Kashif Shafi (Lahore Eagles); Mansoor Amjad, Mohammad Asif, Sarfraz Ahmed, Shehzad Malik and Tahir Mughal (Sialkot Stallions) all made their T20 debuts.

24 February
14:00
Scorecard

Karachi Zebras; 188/4 (20 overs)	v	Rawalpindi Rams; 175/9 (20 overs)
Ashraf Ali 78 (54); Najaf Shah 2/34 (4 overs)		Naved Ashraf 57 (45); Hasan Raza 2/17 (3 overs)

Karachi Zebras won by 13 runs
United Bank Limited Sports Complex, Karachi
Umpires: Akmal Hayat and Zameer Haider

- Rawalpindi Rams won the toss and elected to field.
- Ashraf Ali, Azam Hussain, Hasan Raza, Maisam Hasnain, Naumanullah, Rizwan Saeed, Tahir Khan, Tanvir Ahmed (Karachi Zebras); Alamgir Khan, Babar Naeem, Mohammad Wasim, Najaf Shah, Nauman Aman, Usman Saeed and Yasir Arafat (Rawalpindi Rams) all made their T20 debuts.

24 February
17:00 (D/N)
Scorecard

Peshawar Panthers; 185/5 (20 overs)	v	Faisalabad Wolves; 153 (17.1 overs)
Rafatullah Mohmand 68 (52); Ahmed Hayat 1/23 (3 overs)		Asif Hussain 61 (44); Jannisar Khan 3/11 (2.1 overs)

Peshawar Panthers won by 32 runs
National Stadium, Karachi
Umpires: Akbar Khan and Mohammad Nazir

- Peshawar Panthers won the toss and elected to bat.
- Misbah-ul-Haq (Faisalabad Wolves); Fazl-e-Akbar, Riaz Afridi and Wajahatullah Wasti (Peshawar Panthers) all made their T20 debuts.

25 February
10:00
Scorecard

Rawalpindi Rams; 163/7 (20 overs)	v	Sialkot Stallions; 165/2 (17.1 overs)
Mohammad Wasim 74 (48); Shoaib Malik 5/13 (3 overs)		Shahid Yousuf 68 (42); Babar Naeem 1/15 (2 overs)

Sialkot Stallions won by 8 wickets
United Bank Limited Sports Complex, Karachi
Umpires: Iftikhar Malik and Mohammad Nazir

- Sialkot Stallions won the toss and elected to field.
- Asim Iqbal (Rawalpindi Rams) made his T20 debut.

25 February
14:00
Scorecard

Multan Tigers; 122 (18.2 overs)	v	Faisalabad Wolves; 123/2 (7.3 overs)
Adnan Akmal 29 (27); Saeed Ajmal 3/33 (3.2 overs)		Mohammad Hafeez 59* (29); Kamran Hussain 2/11 (2 overs)

Faisalabad Wolves won by 8 wickets
United Bank Limited Sports Complex, Karachi
Umpires: Afzaal Ahmed and Akbar Khan

- Multan Tigers won the toss and elected to bat.
- Azhar Shafiq, Majid Majeed, Mohammad Irshad, Saeed Anwar and Usman Tariq (Multan Tigers) all made their T20 debuts.

25 February
17:00 (D/N)
Scorecard

Karachi Zebras; 160/3 (20 overs)	v	Peshawar Panthers; 160/7 (20 overs)
Khurram Manzoor 57 (40); Jannisar Khan 2/32 (4 overs)		Rafatullah Mohmand 49 (29); Hasan Raza 3/13 (2 overs)

Scores level; Karachi Zebras won by wickets
National Stadium, Karachi
Umpires: Iqbal Butt and Zameer Haider

- Karachi Zebras won the toss and elected to bat.
- Karachi Zebras won by losing fewer wickets (first tie-breaking method)

26 February
10:00
Scorecard

Faisalabad Wolves; 221/7 (20 overs)	v	Karachi Zebras; 108 (14.4 overs)
Asif Hussain 84 (43); Anwar Ali 2/37 (4 overs)		Tanvir Ahmed 35 (24); Samiullah Khan 4/27 (4 overs)

Faisalabad Wolves won by 113 runs
United Bank Limited Sports Complex, Karachi
Umpires: Mohammad Nazir and Zafar Iqbal

- Karachi Zebras won the toss and elected to field.
- Anwar Ali (Karachi Zebras) made his T20 debut.

26 February
14:00
Scorecard

Peshawar Panthers; 171/8 (20 overs)	v	Lahore Eagles; 175/5 (18.1 overs)
Yasir Hameed 55 (44); Imran Farhat 3/26 (4 overs)		Ashfaq Ahmed 66 (30); Mohammad Aslam 2/24 (4 overs)

Lahore Eagles won by 5 wickets
United Bank Limited Sports Complex, Karachi
Umpires: Iftikhar Malik and Nadeem Ghauri

- Peshawar Panthers won the toss and elected to bat.
- Kamran Sajid (Lahore Eagles) made his T20 debut.

26 February
17:00 (D/N)
Scorecard

Rawalpindi Rams; 165/6 (20 overs)	v	Multan Tigers; 75/5 (10 overs)
Naved Ashraf 56 (39); Saeed Anwar 2/32 (4 overs)		Aamer Bashir 17* (14); Jawad Hameed 1/2 (1 over)

Rawalpindi Rams won by 24 runs (D/L)
National Stadium, Karachi
Umpires: Mohammad Aslam and Zameer Haider

- Rawalpindi Rams won the toss and elected to bat.
- The Multan Tigers' target was revised to 100 runs from 10 overs according to the Duckworth–Lewis method.

27 February
10:00
Scorecard

Rawalpindi Rams; 157/9 (20 overs)	v	Lahore Eagles; 160/3 (17.5 overs)
Mohammad Wasim 45 (40); Sohail Ahmed 4/29 (4 overs)		Ashfaq Ahmed 99* (58); Yasir Arafat 1/37 (4 overs)

Lahore Eagles won by 7 wickets
National Bank of Pakistan Sports Complex, Karachi
Umpires: Riazuddin and Shakeel Khan

- Rawalpindi Rams won the toss and elected to bat.

27 February
10:00
Scorecard

Peshawar Panthers; 126 (19 overs)	v	Sialkot Stallions; 127/5 (16.4 overs)
Rafatullah Mohmand 33 (22); Naved-ul-Hasan 2/14 (3 overs)		Imran Nazir 40 (20); Umar Gul 2/21 (4 overs)

Sialkot Stallions won by 5 wickets
United Bank Limited Sports Complex, Karachi
Umpires: Siddiq Khan and Zameer Haider

- Sialkot Stallions won the toss and elected to field.
- Mohammad Fayyaz and Taimur Khan (Peshawar Panthers) both made their T20 debuts.

27 February
14:00
Scorecard

Karachi Zebras; 173/9 (20 overs)	v	Multan Tigers; 173/9 (20 overs)
Khurram Manzoor 100 (61); Mohammad Irshad 3/33 (4 overs)		Saeed Anwar 73 (60); Hasan Raza 2/31 (4 overs)

Scores level; Multan Tigers won by scoring rate
United Bank Limited Sports Complex, Karachi
Umpires: Mohammad Aslam and Mohammad Nazir

- Karachi Zebras won the toss and elected to bat.
- Multan Tigers won by having a better run rate in the first ten overs. This is the second tie-breaking method, after wickets lost.
- Nasir Khan (Karachi Zebras); Bilal Khilji and Kashif Naved (Multan Tigers) all made their T20 debuts.

28 February
10:00
Scorecard

Peshawar Panthers; 187/6 (20 overs)	v	Multan Tigers; 186/8 (20 overs)
Akhtar Sarfraz 48* (37); Kashif Naved 2/36 (4 overs)		Saeed Anwar 54 (46); Waqar Ahmed 2/44 (4 overs)

Peshawar Panthers won by 1 run
United Bank Limited Sports Complex, Karachi
Umpires: Ahmed Shahab and Riazuddin

- Multan Tigers won the toss and elected to field.
- Waqar Ahmed and Zulfiqar Jan (Peshawar Panthers) both made their T20 debuts.

28 February
14:00
Scorecard

Faisalabad Wolves; 205 (19.4 overs)	v	Lahore Eagles; 162 (16.1 overs)
Mohammad Salman 46 (34); Jahangir Mirza 4/28 (2.4 overs)		Imran Farhat 62 (23); Samiullah Khan 3/47 (4 overs)

Faisalabad Wolves won by 43 runs
United Bank Limited Sports Complex, Karachi
Umpires: Afzaal Ahmed and Saleem Badar

- Faisalabad Wolves won the toss and elected to bat.

28 February
17:00 (D/N)
Scorecard

Sialkot Stallions; 217/8 (20 overs)	v	Karachi Zebras; 134 (16.5 overs)
Shoaib Malik 78 (37); Danish Kaneria 4/31 (4 overs)		Naumanullah 36 (22); Shoaib Malik 3/18 (3.5 overs)

Sialkot Stallions won by 83 runs
National Stadium, Karachi
Umpires: Iftikhar Malik and Nadeem Ghauri

- Sialkot Stallions won the toss and elected to bat.
- Farhan Adil (Karachi Zebras) made his T20 debut.

1 March
10:00
Scorecard

Rawalpindi Rams; 140 (18 overs)	v	Peshawar Panthers; 141/3 (18.2 overs)
Asim Iqbal 44 (27); Aftab Alam 2/18 (2 overs)		Yasir Hameed 69 (63); Naved Ashraf 1/10 (1.3 overs)

Peshawar Panthers won by 7 wickets
United Bank Limited Sports Complex, Karachi
Umpires: Javed Iqbal and Riazuddin

- Rawalpindi Rams won the toss and elected to bat.

1 March
17:00 (D/N)
Scorecard

Faisalabad Wolves; 98 (12.5 overs)	v	Sialkot Stallions; 99/4 (16.1 overs)
Asif Hussain 28 (15); Mohammad Asif 5/11 (3.5 overs)		Faisal Naved 34 (27); Mohammad Hafeez 1/2 (1 over)

Sialkot Stallions won by 6 wickets
National Stadium, Karachi
Umpires: Iftikhar Malik and Nadeem Ghauri

- Faisalabad Wolves won the toss and elected to bat.
- Faisal Naved (Sialkot Stallions) made his T20 debut.

1 March
20:30 (D/N)
Scorecard

Lahore Eagles; 203/8 (20 overs)	v	Multan Tigers; 166 (19 overs)
Imran Farhat 115 (62); Abdur Rauf 3/34 (4 overs)		Azhar Shafiq 29 (23); Imran Farhat 3/31 (3 overs)

Lahore Eagles won by 30 runs (D/L)
National Stadium, Karachi
Umpires: Saleem Badar and Shakeel Khan

- Lahore Eagles won the toss and elected to bat.

2 March
10:00
Scorecard

Sialkot Stallions; 189/3 (20 overs)	v	Multan Tigers; 123 (18.1 overs)
Qaiser Abbas 75* (42); Mohammad Irshad 2/26 (4 overs)		Bilal Khilji 46 (40); Mohammad Asif 4/14 (4 overs)

Sialkot Stallions won by 66 runs
United Bank Limited Sports Complex, Karachi
Umpires: Iftikhar Malik and Nadeem Ghauri

- Sialkot Stallions won the toss and elected to bat.
- Riaz Ahmed (Multan Tigers) made his T20 debut.

2 March
17:00 (D/N)
Scorecard

Rawalpindi Rams; 105 (17.5 overs)	v	Faisalabad Wolves; 108/0 (9 overs)
Naved Ashraf 38 (34); Imran Khalid 4/21 (4 overs)		Mohammad Hafeez 66* (33)

Faisalabad Wolves won by 10 wickets
National Stadium, Karachi
Umpires: Afzaal Ahmed and Saleem Badar

- Rawalpindi Rams won the toss and elected to bat.
- Rizwan Akbar (Rawalpindi Rams) made his T20 debut.

2 March
20:30 (D/N)
Scorecard

Lahore Eagles; 150 (19.5 overs)	v	Karachi Zebras; 151/7 (18.4 overs)
Kamran Sajid 40 (43); Rizwan Saeed 3/18 (4 overs)		Ashraf Ali 52* (40); Junaid Zia 3/34 (4 overs)

Karachi Zebras won by 3 wickets
National Stadium, Karachi
Umpires: Riazuddin and Shakeel Khan

- Lahore Eagles won the toss and elected to bat.
- Tabish Khan (Karachi Zebras) made his T20 debut.

==== Pool B ====
24 February
14:00
Scorecard

Abbottabad Rhinos; 186/4 (20 overs)	v	Islamabad Leopards; 185/8 (20 overs)
Ali Naqvi 54 (27); Bilal Asad 1/26 (4 overs)		Raheel Majeed 41 (25); Dilawar Khan 3/37 (4 overs)

Abbottabad Rhinos won by 1 run
National Bank of Pakistan Sports Complex, Karachi
Umpires: Ahmed Shahab and Siddiq Khan

- Abbottabad Rhinos won the toss and elected to bat.
- Ali Naqvi, Amjad Waqas, Ashraf Ali, Azhar Ali, Dilawar Khan, Mohammad Bilal, Riaz Kail, Sajjad Ali, Shakeel-ur-Rehman, Zafar Jadoon (Abbottabad Rhinos); Ashar Zaidi, Atif Ashraf, Bazid Khan, Mohammad Altaf, Saad Altaf, Safdar Niazi, Sufyan Munir and Zohaib Ahmed (Islamabad Leopards) all made their T20 debuts.

24 February
10:00
Scorecard

Hyderabad Hawks; 140/7 (20 overs)	v	Quetta Bears; 112 (18.1 overs)
Shahid Qambrani 43 (34); Adil Nisar 4/21 (3 overs)		Shoaib Khan 33 (26); Farhan Ayub 4/20 (4 overs)

Hyderabad Hawks won by 28 runs
National Bank of Pakistan Sports Complex, Karachi
Umpires: Javed Iqbal and Mohammad Aslam

- Quetta Bears won the toss and elected to field.
- Faisal Athar, Farhan Ayub, Farrukh Sheikh, Naeem-ur-Rehman, Nauman Ali (Hyderabad Hawks); Adil Nisar, Faisal Irfan, Hameedullah Khan, Mohammad Umar and Sabir Hussain (Quetta Bears) all made their T20 debuts.

24 February
20:30 (D/N)
Scorecard

Karachi Dolphins; 199/7 (20 overs)	v	Lahore Lions; 202/9 (19.5 overs)
Afsar Nawaz 71 (46); Rizwan Ahmed 3/32 (4 overs)		Abdul Razzaq 63 (30); Haaris Ayaz 3/44 (3 overs)

Lahore Lions won by 1 wicket
National Stadium, Karachi
Umpires: Kaukab Butt and Zafar Iqbal

- Karachi Dolphins won the toss and elected to bat.
- Asim Kamal, Faisal Iqbal, Irfanuddin (Karachi Dolphins); Imran Tahir, Rizwan Ahmed, Shehzad Butt and Zulqarnain Haider (Lahore Lions) all made their T20 debuts.

25 February
17:00 (D/N)
Scorecard

Quetta Bears; 142/5 (20 overs)	v	Abbottabad Rhinos; 144/3 (16.4 overs)
Shoaib Khan 67 (47); Shakeel-ur-Rehman 3/30 (4 overs)		Ali Naqvi 41* (27); Mohammad Umar 1/20 (2 overs)

Abbottabad Rhinos won by 7 wickets
National Bank of Pakistan Sports Complex, Karachi
Umpires: Ahmed Shahab and Siddiq Khan

- Quetta Bears won the toss and elected to bat.

25 February
10:00
Scorecard

Hyderabad Hawks; 110/9 (20 overs)	v	Lahore Lions; 111/3 (17.2 overs)
Faisal Athar 24 (37); Ali Azmat 3/15 (3 overs)		Kamran Akmal 47* (43); Nauman Ali 1/17 (3.2 overs)

Lahore Lions won by 7 wickets
National Bank of Pakistan Sports Complex, Karachi
Umpires: Kaukab Butt and Zafar Iqbal

- Lahore Lions won the toss and elected to field.

25 February
20:30 (D/N)
Scorecard

Islamabad Leopards; 183/6 (20 overs)	v	Karachi Dolphins; 185/5 (19.2 overs)
Bilal Asad 51 (36); Irfanuddin 4/20 (4 overs)		Faisal Iqbal 42 (25); Iftikhar Anjum 1/25 (3.2 overs)

Karachi Dolphins won by 5 wickets
National Stadium, Karachi
Umpires: Javed Iqbal and Mohammad Aslam

- Islamabad Leopards won the toss and elected to bat.
- Afaq Raheem, Rauf Akbar (Islamabad Leopards); Nauman Alavi, Rajesh Ramesh and Sarfraz Ahmed (Karachi Dolphins) made their T20 debuts.

26 February
14:00
Scorecard

Karachi Dolphins; 176/6 (20 overs)	v	Abbottabad Rhinos; 166 (19.2 overs)
Afsar Nawaz 61 (43); Riaz Kail 3/17 (2 overs)		Zafar Jadoon 62 (34); Afsar Nawaz 2/6 (1.2 overs)

Karachi Dolphins won by 10 runs
National Bank of Pakistan Sports Complex, Karachi
Umpires: Akbar Khan and Rasheed Bhatti

- Karachi Dolphins won the toss and elected to bat.
- Mudassar Ibrahim (Abbottabad Rhinos) and Saad Wasim (Karachi Dolphins) made their T20 debuts.

26 February
10:00
Scorecard

Quetta Bears; 120/6 (20 overs)	v	Lahore Lions; 121/1 (14.1 overs)
Faisal Irfan 40 (35); Abdul Razzaq 2/7 (4 overs)		Abdul Razzaq 62* (44); Ali Imran 1/41 (4 overs)

Lahore Lions won by 9 wickets
National Bank of Pakistan Sports Complex, Karachi
Umpires: Akmal Hayat and Iqbal Butt

- Lahore Lions won the toss and elected to field.
- Umar Javed (Lahore Lions) and Ghulam Sarwar (Quetta Bears) made their T20 debuts.

26 February
20:30 (D/N)
Scorecard

Hyderabad Hawks; 180/7 (20 overs)	v	Islamabad Leopards; 181/6 (19.4 overs)
Faisal Athar 35 (21); Ashar Zaidi 2/16 (4 overs)		Bazid Khan 90 (47); Hanif-ur-Rehman 2/29 (3.4 overs)

Islamabad Leopards won by 4 wickets
National Stadium, Karachi
Umpires: Ahmed Shahab and Siddiq Khan

- Hyderabad Hawks won the toss and elected to bat.
- Khadim Hussain (Hyderabad Hawks) and Imad Wasim (Islamabad Leopards) made their T20 debuts.

27 February
14:00
Scorecard

Lahore Lions; 234/4 (20 overs)	v	Islamabad Leopards; 147 (18 overs)
Taufeeq Umar 100* (60); Bazid Khan 1/6 (1 over)		Bilal Asad 35 (24); Taufeeq Umar 4/11 (3 overs)

Lahore Lions won by 87 runs
National Bank of Pakistan Sports Complex, Karachi
Umpires: Akmal Hayat and Iqbal Butt

- Islamabad Leopards won the toss and elected to field.

27 February
20:30 (D/N)
Scorecard

Abbottabad Rhinos; 174 (19.4 overs)	v	Hyderabad Hawks; 176/1 (19.2 overs)
Ali Naqvi 45 (28); Pir Zulfiqar 4/29 (2.4 overs)		Faisal Athar 66* (41); Mohammad Siddiq 1/19 (3.2 overs)

Hyderabad Hawks won by 9 wickets
National Stadium, Karachi
Umpires: Kaukab Butt and Zafar Iqbal

- Hyderabad Hawks won the toss and elected to field.
- Mohammad Siddiq (Abbottabad Rhinos) and Pir Zulfiqar (Hyderabad Hawks) made their T20 debuts.

27 February
17:00 (D/N)
Scorecard

Quetta Bears; 154 (19.5 overs)	v	Karachi Dolphins; 158/4 (17 overs)
Faisal Irfan 50 (28); Irfanuddin 4/26 (3.5 overs)		Afsar Nawaz 64 (46); Azharullah 1/15 (3 overs)

Karachi Dolphins won by 6 wickets
National Stadium, Karachi
Umpires: Akbar Khan and Rasheed Bhatti

- Quetta Bears won the toss and elected to bat.

28 February
14:00
Scorecard

Hyderabad Hawks; 112/8 (20 overs)	v	Karachi Dolphins; 115/3 (15.4 overs)
Shahid Qambrani 35 (34); Irfanuddin 2/16 (4 overs)		Agha Sabir 51* (61); Naeem-ur-Rehman 2/17 (4 overs)

Karachi Dolphins won by 7 wickets
National Bank of Pakistan Sports Complex, Karachi
Umpires: Javed Iqbal and Kaukab Butt

- Hyderabad Hawks won the toss and elected to bat.
- Sharjeel Khan (Hyderabad Hawks) made his T20 debut.

28 February
10:00
Scorecard

Islamabad Leopards; 158/9 (20 overs)	v	Quetta Bears; 115 (18 overs)
Bilal Asad 31 (23); Jalat Khan 3/25 (4 overs)		Sabir Hussain 40 (34); Rauf Akbar 4/28 (4 overs)

Islamabad Leopards won by 43 runs
National Bank of Pakistan Sports Complex, Karachi
Umpires: Akbar Khan and Rasheed Bhatti

- Islamabad Leopards won the toss and elected to bat.
- Nauman Sadiq (Islamabad Leopards) and Zahoor Ahmed (Quetta Bears) made their T20 debuts.

28 February
20:30 (D/N)
Scorecard

Lahore Lions; 163 (20 overs)	v	Abbottabad Rhinos; 162/7 (20 overs)
Zulqarnain Haider 35 (20); Amjad Waqas 3/22 (4 overs)		Ali Naqvi 43 (32); Wahab Riaz 2/36 (4 overs)

Lahore Lions won by 1 run
National Stadium, Karachi
Umpires: Akmal Hayat and Iqbal Butt

- Abbottabad Rhinos won the toss and elected to field.
- Adnan Raees and Ahmed Said (Abbottabad Rhinos) made their T20 debuts.

=== Knockout stage ===
Semi-finals

3 March
17:00 (D/N)
Scorecard

Sialkot Stallions; 198/8 (20 overs)	v	Karachi Dolphins; 169/7 (20 overs)
Tahir Mughal 94 (55); Irfanuddin 6/25 (4 overs)		Agha Sabir 40 (33); Qaiser Abbas 3/17 (2 overs)

Sialkot Stallions won by 29 runs
National Stadium, Karachi
Umpires: Mohammad Aslam and Zameer Haider

- Sialkot Stallions won the toss and elected to bat.

3 March
20:30 (D/N)
Scorecard

Lahore Lions; 149/9 (20 overs)	v	Faisalabad Wolves; 150/4 (17.5 overs)
Mohammad Yousuf 30 (27); Samiullah Khan 3/21 (4 overs)		Misbah-ul-Haq 44* (30); Shehzad Butt 2/28 (2.5 overs)

Faisalabad Wolves won by 6 wickets
National Stadium, Karachi
Umpires: Afzaal Ahmed and Saleem Badar

- Lahore Lions won the toss and elected to bat.

Final

4 March
19:30 (D/N)
Scorecard

Faisalabad Wolves; 152/8 (20 overs)	v	Sialkot Stallions; 156/4 (19.2 overs)
Imran Ali 41 (30); Naved-ul-Hasan 3/37 (4 overs)		Naved-ul-Hasan 40* (26); Khurram Shehzad 1/2 (1 over)

Sialkot Stallions won by 6 wickets
National Stadium, Karachi
Umpires: Nadeem Ghauri and Riazuddin

- Sialkot Stallions won the toss and elected to field.

== Media coverage ==
Ten Sports was covering the tournament until a bomb blast in Karachi. PTV 1 covered some of the remaining matches afterwards.

- Ten Sports
- PTV 1
