= 2006–07 National Twenty20 Cup =

Cricket tournament

- Dates: 21 – 26 December 2006
- Administrator: Pakistan Cricket Board
- Cricket format: Twenty20
- Tournament format(s): Round-robin and knockout
- Host: (Pakistan) Karachi
- Champions: Sialkot Stallions (2nd title)
- Participants: 13
- Matches: 18

The 2006–07 ABN-AMRO Twenty-20 Cup was the third season of the ABN AMRO Twenty-20 Cup in Pakistan, sponsored by ABN AMRO. It was held in Karachi from 21 to 26 December 2006. The tournament was reduced to a shorter format similar to the 2004–05 edition with 18 matches. The Sialkot Stallions successfully defended their title by defeating the Karachi Dolphins in the final.

== Format ==
The 13 competing teams were divided into four groups: Pool A with four teams, Pool B, C and D with three each. Each group played a single Round-robin tournament and the top team from each group advanced to the semi-finals. The winners of the semi-finals played the final.

Awarded points
Result	Points
Won	2 points
No result	1 point
Loss	0 points

The position of the teams in the points table is determined by:

- Total points
- Won
- Lost (fewest)
- Net run rate

=== Prize money ===
The prize money was increased from the previous year, with the winners receiving almost twice that of the previous year.

- Final
  - Winners: Rs. 1,000,000
  - Runners-up: Rs. 500,000
- Match victories
  - Winners of group matches: Rs. 15,000
  - Losers of group matches: Rs. 10,000
  - Winners of semi-finals: Rs. 20,000
  - Losers of semi-finals: Rs. 15,000

== Results ==
=== Teams and standings ===
The top team from each group qualify for the semi-finals.

Pool A
Team	Pld	W	L	NR	Pts	NRR
Karachi Dolphins	3	3	0	0	6	+1.394
Faisalabad Wolves	3	2	1	0	4	+2.049
Lahore Eagles	3	1	2	0	2	+0.067
Abbottabad Rhinos	3	0	3	0	0	–3.345

Pool B
Team	Pld	W	L	NR	Pts	NRR
Sialkot Stallions	2	2	0	0	4	+0.282
Karachi Zebras	2	1	1	0	2	+1.478
Hyderabad Hawks	2	0	2	0	0	–1.513

Pool C
Team	Pld	W	L	NR	Pts	NRR
Peshawar Panthers	2	2	0	0	4	+2.038
Multan Tigers	2	1	1	0	2	+0.141
Islamabad Leopards	2	0	2	0	0	–2.150

Pool D
Team	Pld	W	L	NR	Pts	NRR
Lahore Lions	2	2	0	0	4	+0.274
Rawalpindi Rams	2	1	1	0	2	+0.450
Quetta Bears	2	0	2	0	0	–0.721

Qualified for semi-finals

=== Knockout stage ===
Semifinals
A1	Peshawar Panthers	124/9
C1	Karachi Dolphins	128/5
B1	Sialkot Stallions	120/1
D1	Lahore Lions	119

Final
C1	Karachi Dolphins	137/7
B1	Sialkot Stallions	151

== Fixtures ==
=== Group stage ===
Pool A

21 December
Scorecard

Lahore Eagles; 170/6 (20 overs)	v	Abbottabad Rhinos; 90 (17.2 overs)
Ashfaq Ahmed 50 (27); Dilawar Khan 2/27 (4 overs)		Adnan Raees 25 (25); Junaid Zia 3/15 (4 overs)

Lahore Eagles won by 80 runs
National Bank of Pakistan Sports Complex, Karachi
Umpires: Akbar Khan and Islam Khan

- Abbottabad Rhinos won the toss and elected to field.
- Hammad Ali, Junaid Khan and Nasir Jalil (Abbottabad Rhinos) all made their T20 debuts.

21 December (D/N)
Scorecard

Karachi Dolphins; 171/4 (20 overs)	v	Faisalabad Wolves; 169/9 (20 overs)
Khalid Latif 72 (47); Saeed Ajmal 2/36 (4 overs)		Misbah-ul-Haq 53 (33); Shahid Afridi 2/29 (4 overs)

Karachi Dolphins won by 2 runs
National Stadium, Karachi
Umpires: Kaukab Butt and Saleem Badar

- Karachi Dolphins won the toss and elected to bat.
- Asad Ali and Mohammad Zahid (Faisalabad Wolves) made their T20 debuts.

22 December (D/N)
Scorecard

Faisalabad Wolves; 162/7 (20 overs)	v	Lahore Eagles; 138/8 (20 overs)
Misbah-ul-Haq 60* (48); Mohammad Khalil 3/40 (4 overs)		Arsalan Mir 29 (20); Asad Ali 2/12 (4 overs)

Faisalabad Wolves won by 24 runs
National Stadium, Karachi
Umpires: Islam Khan and Riazuddin

- Faisalabad Wolves won the toss and elected to bat.

23 December
Scorecard

Abbottabad Rhinos; 113/8 (20 overs)	v	Karachi Dolphins; 114/2 (17.1 overs)
Sajid Shah 37 (27); Shahid Afridi 3/23 (4 overs)		Shadab Kabir 40 (50); Amjad Waqas 1/16 (3 overs)

Karachi Dolphins won by 8 wickets
Asghar Ali Shah Cricket Stadium, Karachi
Umpires: Ahsan Raza and Siddiq Khan

- Karachi Dolphins won the toss and elected to field.

24 December
17:00 (D/N)
Scorecard

Abbottabad Rhinos; 105/8 (20 overs)	v	Faisalabad Wolves; 106/3 (8.5 overs)
Sajid Shah 30 (39); Mohammad Hafeez 3/16 (4 overs)		Mohammad Hafeez 33 (18); Dilawar Khan 1/14 (0.5 overs)

Faisalabad Wolves won by 7 wickets
National Stadium, Karachi
Umpires: Iftikhar Malik and Islam Khan

- Abbottabad Rhinos won the toss and elected to bat.
- Mohammad Naeem and Wajid Ali (Abbottabad Rhinos) made their T20 debuts.

24 December
19:30 (D/N)
Scorecard

Lahore Eagles; 71 (14.5 overs)	v	Karachi Dolphins; 74/1 (12.1 overs)
Aamer Sajjad 18 (20); Fawad Alam 2/4 (1.5 overs)		Fawad Alam 34* (33)

Karachi Dolphins won by 9 wickets
National Stadium, Karachi
Umpires: Siddiq Khan and Zameer Haider

- Lahore Eagles won the toss and elected to bat.

Pool B

21 December
Scorecard

Karachi Zebras; 149/9 (20 overs)	v	Hyderabad Hawks; 97/9 (20 overs)
Asim Kamal 49 (30); Rizwan Ahmed 2/24 (4 overs)		Taj Wasan 26 (39); Danish Kaneria 3/13 (4 overs)

Karachi Zebras won by 52 runs
United Bank Limited Sports Complex, Karachi
Umpires: Iqbal Butt and Zaheer Ahmed

- Hyderabad Hawks won the toss and elected to field.
- Nasir Awais, Taj Wasan (Hyderabad Hawks) and Asif Zakir (Karachi Zebras) all made their T20 debuts.

22 December (D/N)
Scorecard

Sialkot Stallions; 106 (17.5 overs)	v	Karachi Zebras; 69/5 (13.5 overs)
Naved-ul-Hasan 28 (23); Malik Aftab 4/17 (4 overs)		Hasan Raza 28 (33); Mohammad Asif 2/11 (4 overs)

Sialkot Stallions won by 2 runs (D/L)
National Stadium, Karachi
Umpires: Ahmed Shahab and Siddiq Khan

- Sialkot Stallions won the toss and elected to bat.
- Play was stopped in the Karachi Zebras' innings after 13.5 overs. Their target would have been 72 runs according to the Duckworth–Lewis method.

23 December
Scorecard

Hyderabad Hawks; 143/4 (20 overs)	v	Sialkot Stallions; 144/3 (19 overs)
Rizwan Ahmed 42* (40); Tahir Mughal 2/22 (4 overs)		Shoaib Malik 53* (61); Farhan Ayub 2/23 (4 overs)

Sialkot Stallions won by 7 wickets
United Bank Limited Sports Complex, Karachi
Umpires: Iftikhar Malik and Raweed Khan

- Hyderabad Hawks won the toss and elected to bat.
- Ghulam Murtaza and Lal Kumar (Hyderabad Hawks) both made their T20 debuts.

Pool C

21 December (D/N)
Scorecard

Multan Tigers; 124 (18.2 overs)	v	Peshawar Panthers; 125/5 (17.5 overs)
Saeed Anwar 51 (48); Mohammad Aslam 4/13 (3.2 overs)		Rafatullah Mohmand 32 (16); Mohammad Irshad 2/14 (2 overs)

Peshawar Panthers won by 5 wickets
National Stadium, Karachi
Umpires: Ahsan Raza and Shakeel Khan

- Multan Tigers won the toss and elected to bat.
- Imranullah Aslam (Multan Tigers) made his T20 debut.

22 December
Scorecard

Multan Tigers; 147/8 (20 overs)	v	Islamabad Leopards; 126 (18.1 overs)
Kamran Hussain 44 (32); Azhar Mahmood 3/17 (4 overs)		Bazid Khan 53 (45); Imranullah Aslam 5/17 (4 overs)

Multan Tigers won by 21 runs
Asghar Ali Shah Cricket Stadium, Karachi
Umpires: Iqbal Butt and Kaukab Butt

- Multan Tigers won the toss and elected to bat.
- Fakhar Hussain, Naeem Anjum (Islamabad Leopards) and Hanain Abbas (Multan Tigers) made their T20 debuts.

23 December (D/N)
Scorecard

Peshawar Panthers; 146/6 (20 overs)	v	Islamabad Leopards; 81/8 (20 overs)
Wajahatullah Wasti 48 (38); Iftikhar Anjum 2/27 (3 overs)		Shoaib Akhtar 14 (13); Fazl-e-Akbar 3/9 (3 overs)

Peshawar Panthers won by 65 runs
National Stadium, Karachi
Umpires: Rasheed Bhatti and Zameer Haider

- Islamabad Leopards won the toss and elected to field.

Pool D

22 December
Scorecard

Rawalpindi Rams; 172/5 (20 overs)	v	Quetta Bears; 152/9 (20 overs)
Mohammad Wasim 86* (64); Faisal Irfan 3/22 (4 overs)		Shoaib Khan 44 (24); Najaf Shah 2/41 (4 overs)

Rawalpindi Rams won by 20 runs
National Bank of Pakistan Sports Complex, Karachi
Umpires: Akbar Khan and Zaheer Ahmed

- Rawalpindi Rams won the toss and elected to bat.
- Gohar Faiz, Mohammad Alam (Quetta Bears); Akhtar Ayub, Naved Malik and Yasim Murtaza (Rawalpindi Rams) all made their T20 debuts.

23 December (D/N)
Scorecard

Lahore Lions; 178/7 (20 overs)	v	Rawalpindi Rams; 176/8 (20 overs)
Kamran Akmal 59 (34); Akhtar Ayub 1/18 (2 overs)		Babar Naeem 39 (21); Kashif Siddiq 2/17 (4 overs)

Lahore Lions won by 2 runs
National Stadium, Karachi
Umpires: Mohammad Aslam and Saleem Badar

- Lahore Lions won the toss and elected to bat.
- Asif Raza, Imran Ali and Kashif Siddiq (Lahore Lions) all made their T20 debuts.

24 December
Scorecard

Quetta Bears; 148/5 (20 overs)	v	Lahore Lions; 150/7 (19.1 overs)
Umar Javed 43* (36); Wahab Riaz 2/18 (3 overs)		Rashid Riaz 32 (21); Arun Lal 2/20 (4 overs)

Lahore Lions won by 3 wickets
United Bank Limited Sports Complex, Karachi
Umpires: Rasheed Bhatti and Raweed Khan

- Lahore Lions won the toss and elected to field.
- Yasir Majeed (Quetta Bears) made his T20 debut.

=== Knockout stage ===
Semi-finals

25 December
17:00
Scorecard

Peshawar Panthers; 124/9 (20 overs)	v	Karachi Dolphins; 128/5 (15.4 overs)
Mohammad Fayyaz 24 (23); Azam Hussain 3/19 (4 overs)		Shahid Afridi 49 (19); Arshad Khan 2/40 (3.4 overs)

Karachi Dolphins won by 5 wickets
National Stadium, Karachi
Umpires: Mohammad Aslam and Saleem Badar
Player of the match: Shahid Afridi (Karachi Dolphins)

- Peshawar Panthers won the toss and elected to bat.

25 December
20:30 (D/N)
Scorecard

Lahore Lions; 119 (19.3 overs)	v	Sialkot Stallions; 120/1 (17.1 overs)
Adnan Raza 32 (33); Naved-ul-Hasan 3/9 (4 overs)		Imran Nazir 76* (59); Kashif Siddiq 1/16 (4 overs)

Sialkot Stallions won by 9 wickets
National Stadium, Karachi
Umpires: Shakeel Khan and Zameer Haider
Player of the match: Imran Nazir (Sialkot Stallions)

- Sialkot Stallions won the toss and elected to field.

Final

26 December
19:00 (D/N)
Scorecard

Sialkot Stallions; 151 (20 overs)	v	Karachi Dolphins; 137/7 (20 overs)
Imran Nazir 46 (31); Fawad Alam 5/27 (4 overs)		Fawad Alam 54 (43); Abdur Rehman 2/21 (4 overs)

Sialkot Stallions won by 14 runs
National Stadium, Karachi
Umpires: Nadeem Ghauri and Riazuddin
Player of the match: Fawad Alam (Karachi Dolphins)

- Karachi Dolphins won the toss and elected to field.

== Media coverage ==
- Geo Super (live)
