= List of Abbottabad cricketers =

This is a list of cricketers who have played matches for the Abbottabad cricket team, a first-class cricket team from Abbottabad in Pakistan.

== Notable players ==
- Asad Afridi
- Fawad Ahmed
- Sohail Akhtar
- Ashraf Ali
- Asif Ali
- Hammad Ali
- Sajjad Ali
- Wajid Ali
- Noor-ul-Amin
- Mir Azam
- Mohammad Bilal
- Armaghan Elahi
- Yasir Hameed
- Zafar Jadoon
- Nasir Jalil
- Riaz Kail
- Khalilullah
- Arshad Khan
- Dilawar Khan
- Fawad Khan
- Junaid Khan
- Usman Khan
- Rashid Mansoor
- Ghulam Mohammad
- Mohammad Naeem
- Ali Naqvi
- Adnan Raees
- Shakeel-ur-Rehman
- Ahmed Said
- Sajid Shah
- Yasir Shah
- Mohammad Siddiq
- Khalid Usman
- Amjad Waqas
