= List of Hyderabad cricketers (Pakistan) =

List of cricketers

This is a list of cricketers who have played first-class, List A or Twenty20 matches for the Hyderabad cricket team in Pakistan. The team played 184 first-class matches between 1958 and 2015, 30 List A matches between 1985 and 2016, and 5 Twenty20 matches in 2015.

== Players ==
- Mohammad Afzal
- Qamar Ahmed
- Rizwan Ahmed
- Zahid Ahmed
- Abid Ali
- Masroor Ali
- Mir Ali
- Nauman Ali
- Faisal Athar
- Mohammad Awais
- Nasir Awais
- Farhan Ayub
- Tariq Aziz
- Kashif Bhatti
- Imran Brohi
- Azeem Ghumman
- Mohammad Hasnain
- Khadim Hussain
- Sajjad Hussain
- Mohammad Hasnain
- Aamer Iqbal
- Shahid Iqbal
- Bilal Irshad
- Sohail Jaffar
- Alan Jones
- Babar Khan
- Haris Khan
- Imran Khan
- Razaullah Khan
- Sharjeel Khan
- Lal Kumar
- Zahid Mahmood
- Nasrullah Memon
- Imraan Mohammad
- Ghulam Murtaza
- Naumanullah
- Mohammad Nawaz
- Shahid Qambrani
- Umar Rasheed
- Kashif Raza
- Abdur Rehman
- Hanif-ur-Rehman
- Naeem-ur-Rehman
- Aslam Sattar
- Hazrat Shah
- Iqbal Sheikh (born 1934)
- Iqbal Sheikh (born 1973)
- Iqbal Sikander
- Mohammad Sohail
- Taj Wasan
- Pir Zulfiqar
