= 2006–07 Quaid-e-Azam Trophy =

Cricket tournament

- Dates: 6 January 2007 – 4 March 2007
- Administrator(s): Pakistan Cricket Board
- Cricket format: First-class
- Tournament format(s): Two division league; round-robin and finals
- Host(s): Pakistan
- Champions: Karachi Urban
- Participants: 13
- Matches: 22 (Gold), 17 (Silver)
- Official website: www.pcb.com.pk

The 2006–07 Quaid-e-Azam Trophy was one of three first-class domestic cricket competitions that were held in Pakistan during the 2006–07 season. The Quaid-e-Azam Trophy was contested by thirteen teams representing regional associations; (Note: The top level of domestic cricket in Pakistan was historically played by teams representing regional cricket associations and departments, which were owned and run by corporations, institutions or government departments.) it was preceded in the schedule by the Patron's Trophy (Grade-I), contested by nine departmental teams, and followed later in the season by the Pentangular Cup, which unlike the previous year did not involve teams from the Quaid-e-Azam Trophy.

There was no change to the structure of the competition from the previous season, with seven teams in the Gold League and six teams in the Silver League. Each league was played in a round-robin of four-day matches beginning on 6 January 2007, with a final played over five days between the top two teams to determine the winner. The winner of the Gold League final received the Quaid-e-Azam Trophy; the winner of the Silver League final would have gained promotion to the Gold league, with the last placed team in the Gold League being relegated to the Silver League, but the Pakistan Cricket Board reorganised the regional associations and departments into a single competition for the following season.

Karachi Urban lifted the Quaid-e-Azam Trophy, the eighteenth victory by a Karachi team, after they beat defending champions Sialkot by eight wickets in the Gold League final. Multan won the Silver League final in a replay, after the weather-affected first match ended in a draw with no result on first innings.

== Group stage ==
The top two teams in the round-robin group stage (highlighted) advanced to the finals.

Gold League
Team	Pld	W	L	D	A	Pts
Karachi Urban (C)	6	4	1	1	0	33
Sialkot	6	3	0	3	0	24
Rawalpindi	6	2	2	2	0	21
Peshawar	6	2	3	0	1	18
Faisalabad	6	2	3	1	0	18
Karachi Harbour	6	1	3	2	0	15
Lahore Shalimar	6	0	2	3	1	6

Silver League
Team	Pld	W	L	D	A	Pts
Islamabad	5	4	0	1	0	39
Multan	5	2	0	3	0	21
Lahore Ravi	5	2	3	0	0	15
Abbottabad	5	1	2	2	0	12
Hyderabad	5	1	3	1	0	9
Quetta	5	1	3	1	0	9

Position determined by total points, most matches won, fewest matches lost, followed by adjusted net run rate (matches with no result, i.e. those where both teams did not complete their first innings, were disregarded); matches finishing in a draw were decided on first innings scores, with points awarded as follows:
- Win = 9 points
- Win having trailed on first innings = 6 points
- Draw having led on first innings = 3 points
- Loss, draw having trailed on first innings, draw with no result based on the first innings, or abandoned without a ball bowled = 0 points

== Finals ==
=== Gold League final ===
19–22 February 2007
Scorecard

Karachi Urban	v	Sialkot
403 (127.4 overs); Hasan Raza 161* (245); Sarfraz Ahmed 6/93 (35.4 overs)		183 (60.3 overs); Ijaz Ahmed 68 (103); Rajesh Ramesh 5/48 (19.3 overs)
69/2 (12.3 overs); Saeed Bin Nasir 26* (25); Sarfraz Ahmed 1/15 (3 overs)		288 (f/o) (93.1 overs); Shahid Yousuf 70 (105); Tanvir Ahmed 3/49 (15 overs)

Karachi Urban won by 8 wickets
Multan Cricket Stadium, Multan
Umpires: Nadeem Ghauri and Zameer Haider

- Sialkot won the toss and elected to field.

=== Silver League final (replay) ===
1–4 March 2007
Scorecard

Multan	v	Islamabad
211 (75.5 overs); Saeed Anwar 71 (152); Rauf Akbar 4/43 (25.5 overs)		180 (45.1 overs); Naeem Anjum 67 (93); Kamran Hussain 4/50 (15 overs)
329 (92.2 overs); Azhar Shafiq 97 (147); Bilal Asad 3/49 (16 overs)		91 (31 overs); Ameer Khan 21 (41); Abdur Rauf 3/44 (13 overs)

Multan won by 269 runs
Iqbal Stadium, Faisalabad
Umpires: Iftikhar Malik and Shakeel Khan

- Islamabad won the toss and elected to field.
