= List of Public Works Department cricketers =

This is a list of cricketers who have played matches for the Public Works Department cricket team, which competed at first-class level in cricket competitions in Pakistan from 1964 to 2003.

== Notable players ==
- Zaheer Abbas
- Afzaal Ahmed
- Asif Ahmed
- Niaz Ahmed
- Saeed Ahmed
- Tanvir Ahmed
- Masood Akhtar
- Alimuddin
- Khalid Alvi
- Bilal Asad
- Faisal Athar
- Haaris Ayaz
- Sikander Bakht
- Aftab Baloch
- Daulat Zaman
- Anwar Elahi
- Ikram Elahi
- Ijaz Faqih
- Afaq Hussain
- Ijaz Hussain
- Munawwar Hussain
- Iqbal Imam
- Jalal-ud-Din
- Azam Khan
- Bazid Khan
- Imran Khan
- Rashid Khan
- Shahid Mahmood
- Masood-ul-Hasan
- Mufasir-ul-Haq
- Nasim-ul-Ghani
- Rajesh Ramesh
- Abdur Raqib
- Shakeel-ur-Rehman
- Ahmer Saeed
- Tauseef Ahmed
