= English cricket team in Pakistan in 2005–06 =

International cricket tour

	Pakistan	England
- Dates: 31 October – 21 December 2005
Captains	Inzamam-ul-Haq	Michael Vaughan; Marcus Trescothick

Test series
- Result: Pakistan won the 3-match series 2–0
Most runs	Inzamam-ul-Haq (431)	Ian Bell (313)
Most wickets	Shoaib Akhtar (17)	Andrew Flintoff (13)
- Player of the series: Inzamam-ul-Haq (PAK)

One Day International series
- Results: Pakistan won the 5-match series 3–2
Most runs	Kamran Akmal (245)	Andrew Flintoff (187)
Most wickets	Naved-ul-Hasan (9)	James Anderson (7); Andrew Flintoff (7); Liam Plunkett (7)
- Player of the series: Kamran Akmal (PAK)

The England cricket team toured Pakistan from October to December 2005. England were looking to maintain the form that had taken them to second place in the ICC Test Championship, and to victory in the 2005 Ashes series at home to Australia, but suffered a sharp reversal of fortune, losing the Test series 2–0 to Pakistan. Pakistan also won the ODI series 3–2. This would be England's last tour of Pakistan until 2022.

== Squads ==
=== England ===
The England squad for the tour was as follows:

==== Tests ====
Michael Vaughan (Yorkshire); James Anderson (Lancashire); Ian Bell (Warwickshire); Paul Collingwood (Durham); Andrew Flintoff (Lancashire); Ashley Giles (Warwickshire); Steve Harmison (Durham); Matthew Hoggard (Yorkshire); Geraint Jones (Kent); Alex Loudon (Warwickshire); Kevin Pietersen (Hampshire); Liam Plunkett (Durham); Matt Prior (Sussex); Andrew Strauss (Middlesex); Marcus Trescothick (captain) (Somerset); Shaun Udal (Hampshire)

Michael Vaughan suffered an injury in the second warm-up match against Pakistan A in Bagh-e-Jinnah, Lahore. He was replaced by Marcus Trescothick as captain for the 1st Test at Multan. Simon Jones of Glamorgan and Chris Tremlett of Hampshire were originally selected but withdrew due to injury on 4 October and 13 October respectively. Liam Plunkett of Durham was announced as a replacement for Jones on 11 October. Tremlett was not replaced.

==== ODIs ====
Marcus Trescothick (captain) Somerset; James Anderson (Lancashire); Ian Bell (Warwickshire); Ian Blackwell (Somerset); Paul Collingwood (Durham); Andrew Flintoff (Lancashire); Steve Harmison (Durham); Geraint Jones (Kent); Kabir Ali (Worcestershire) Kevin Pietersen (Hampshire); Liam Plunkett (Durham); Matt Prior (Sussex); Vikram Solanki (Worcestershire); Andrew Strauss (Middlesex); Shaun Udal (Hampshire)

Simon Jones was also named in the squad, but did not travel due to fitness problems. Chris Tremlett was named in the squad and withdrew through injury on 13 October. Udal and Ali were named as replacements. Ashley Giles (hip surgery) and Michael Vaughan (knee surgery) flew home before the ODI series started, with Bell staying in Pakistan and Blackwell coming in as a replacement. Kevin Pietersen played the first two ODIs, but withdrew with a rib injury on 13 December, and was not replaced.

=== Pakistan ===
First and Second Test:

Inzamam-ul-Haq (captain); Salman Butt; Shoaib Malik; Younis Khan; Mohammad Yousuf; Hasan Raza; Kamran Akmal; Danish Kaneria; Mohammad Sami; Naved-ul-Hasan; Shabbir Ahmed; Shoaib Akhtar; Mushtaq Ahmed; Asim Kamal; Shahid Afridi; Arshad Khan

Third Test:

Inzamam-ul-Haq (captain); Salman Butt; Shoaib Malik; Younis Khan; Mohammad Yousuf; Hasan Raza; Kamran Akmal; Danish Kaneria; Mohammad Sami; Naved-ul-Hasan; Shoaib Akhtar; Mushtaq Ahmed; Asim Kamal; Mohammad Asif; Arshad Khan

==== ODIs ====
Inzamam-ul-Haq (captain); Salman Butt; Shoaib Malik; Younis Khan; Mohammad Yousuf; Yasir Hameed; Kamran Akmal; Danish Kaneria; Mohammad Sami; Naved-ul-Hasan; Shoaib Akhtar; Mohammad Asif; Yasir Arafat; Shahid Afridi*; Arshad Khan; Abdul Razzaq

- Shahid Afridi was not eligible for the first two ODIs since he was serving his ban for damaging the pitch.

== Schedule ==
The England team arrived in Pakistan on 26 October and left on 22 December. The schedule was as follows:

- Patron's XI, Rawalpindi (31 Oct-2 Nov) (no play on 2 Nov if it coincides with Eid) (not first-class)
- Pakistan A, Lahore (6-8 Nov)
- First Test, Multan (12-16 Nov)
- Second Test, Faisalabad (20-24 Nov)
- Third Test, Lahore (29 Nov-3 Dec)
- One-day warm-up, Lahore (7 Dec)
- 1st ODI, Lahore (10 Dec)
- 2nd ODI, Lahore (12 Dec)
- 3rd ODI, Karachi (15 Dec)
- 4th ODI, Rawalpindi (19 Dec)
- 5th ODI, Rawalpindi (21 Dec)

== Tour matches ==
=== First-class: Patron's XI v England XI ===
31 October-2 November 2005
Scorecard

England XI	v	Pakistan Cricket Board Patron's XI
256/9d (74 overs); Marcus Trescothick 124 (209); Yasir Arafat 4/45 (17 overs)		211 (60.5 overs); Shehzad Malik 37 (40); Shaun Udal 3/36 (13 overs)
112 (34.1 overs); Marcus Trescothick 38* (60); Yasir Arafat 5/31 (12.1 overs)		105 (35.5 overs); Yasir Hameed 30 (53); Liam Plunkett 4/16 (7 overs)

England XI won by 52 runs
Rawalpindi Cricket Stadium, Rawalpindi
Umpires: Zafar Iqbal (Pak) and Riazuddin (Pak)

- England XI won the toss and elected to bat.

=== First-class: Pakistan A v England XI ===
6–8 November 2005
Scorecard

England XI	v	Pakistan A
126 (35.1 overs); Shaun Udal 23 (28); Mohammad Asif 7/62 (16.1 overs)		138 (33.5 overs); Hasan Raza 34 (67); Matthew Hoggard 4/39 (8 overs)
256 (63.4 overs); Paul Collingwood 61 (70); Mansoor Amjad 5/97 (24 overs)		246/4 (52.2 overs); Shahid Yousuf 57 (105); Andrew Flintoff 3/67 (10.2 overs)

Pakistan A won by 6 wickets
Bagh-e-Jinnah, Lahore
Umpires: Mian Mohammad Aslam (Pak) and Saleem Badar (Pak)

- England XI won the toss and elected to bat.

=== List A: Pakistan A v England XI ===
7 December 2005
Scorecard

England XI; 236/7 (45 overs)	v	Pakistan A 239/9 (44.5 overs)
Paul Collingwood 75* (79); Iftikhar Anjum 2/36 (8 overs)		Bazid Khan 90* (135); James Anderson 4/46 (8.5 overs)

Pakistan A won by 1 wicket
Bagh-e-Jinnah, Lahore
Umpires: Iftikhar Malik (Pak) and Mohammad Nazir (Pak)

- Pakistan A won the toss and elected to field.

== Test series ==
=== 1st Test ===
12–16 November 2005
Scorecard

Pakistan	v	England
274 (98.2 overs); Salman Butt 74 (183); Andrew Flintoff 4/68 (23 overs)		418 (110.4 overs); Marcus Trescothick 193 (305); Shabbir Ahmed 4/54 (22.4 overs)
341 (105.5 overs); Salman Butt 122 (256); Andrew Flintoff 4/88 (25 overs)		175 (52.4 overs); Geraint Jones 33 (75); Danish Kaneria 4/62 (20 overs)

Pakistan won by 22 runs
Multan Cricket Stadium, Multan
Umpires: Billy Bowden (NZ) and Simon Taufel (Aus)
Player of the match: Salman Butt (Pak)

- Pakistan won the toss and elected to bat.

England failed to chase a target of under 200 runs for the first time since the fourth Test of the 1998-99 Ashes, as Danish Kaneria and Shoaib Akhtar shared seven wickets to bowl England out in three spurts at Multan. Pakistan took their first victory over England at home since 1987-88, despite surrendering a first-innings lead of 144 and setting a target of 198 - and England were even 64/1 chasing that target. However, Kaneria removed Andrew Strauss and Ian Bell in the same over, before Paul Collingwood was lbw to Mohammad Sami in the next. England had gone from 64/1 to 67/4 - Andrew Flintoff and Kevin Pietersen added 26, before Kaneria struck again, as Flintoff swept him to Younis Khan. Eventually, they were 117/7, before Shaun Udal came in and added 49 with Geraint Jones - and then, Shoaib Akhtar bowled Jones for 33, leaving England to hit 33 for the last two wickets. Udal and Steve Harmison went in quick succession, and England finished on 175. Despite the efforts of the bowlers, it was Salman Butt who became Man of the Match, as his 122 in the second innings enabled Pakistan to set a target.

=== 2nd Test ===
20–24 November 2005
Scorecard

Pakistan	v	England
462 (115.4 overs); Inzamam-ul-Haq 109 (200); Steve Harmison 3/85 (24.4)		446 (132.3 overs); Ian Bell 115 (272); Shahid Afridi 4/95 (30.3)
268/9d (93.1 overs); Inzamam-ul-Haq 100* (134); Matthew Hoggard 3/50 (16)		164/6 (48 overs); Andrew Flintoff 56 (98); Naved-ul-Hasan 3/30 (12)

Match drawn
Iqbal Stadium, Faisalabad, Pakistan
Umpires: Darrell Hair (Aus) and Simon Taufel (Aus)
Player of the match: Inzamam-ul-Haq (Pak)

- Pakistan won the toss and elected to bat.

Pakistan won the toss and batted first, and scored heavily on the first day - with Shahid Afridi in particular punishing England's bowlers. After the first day, Pakistan had reached 300/4. The second day of the test contains a few dramatic incidents. Inzamam-ul-Haq was run out in controversial circumstances - he was adjudged to have his foot in the air while avoiding a direct shy at the stumps by Stephen Harmison. The laws of cricket state a player should not be given out if he is taking evasive action to avoid injury.

After Pakistan were bowled out for 462, England began their reply. The next incident occurred when a gas canister exploded within the ground, damaging the boundary hoarding and some spectators nearby. Play was halted for around 15 minutes until authorities determined it was safe to continue. However, television footage subsequently showed that Shahid Afridi had deliberately scuffed up the wicket during this distraction - an action for which he was subsequently fined, and banned for one Test match and two One Day Internationals.

After this distraction, England lost 2 quick wickets to end the day of 113/3. They recovered on day 3 through the efforts of Ian Bell and Kevin Pietersen who both scored centuries. England were eventually bowled out for 446, and their bowlers made an improved effort in Pakistan's second innings, reducing them to 183/6 by the end of day 4. They could think about a possible victory, but Inzamam-ul-Haq was still at the wicket going into day 5.

Pakistan declared after Inzamam got his century, shortly before lunch on the fifth day, and in the sixth over England fell to 20/4. However, Kevin Pietersen and Andrew Flintoff added 80 in 22 overs for the fifth wicket, and Geraint Jones and Ashley Giles held on for the draw.

=== 3rd Test ===
29 November–3 December 2005
Scorecard

England	v	Pakistan
288 (94 overs); Paul Collingwood 96 (162); Shoaib Malik 3/58 (14)		636/8d (156.2 overs); Mohammad Yousuf 223 (373); Matthew Hoggard 2/106 (23)
248 (77.1 overs); Ian Bell 92 (189); Shoaib Akhtar 5/71 (19)

Pakistan won by an innings and 100 runs
Gaddafi Stadium, Lahore
Umpires: Darrell Hair (Aus) and Rudi Koertzen (SA)
Player of the match: Mohammad Yousuf (Pak)

- England won the toss and elected to bat.

Pakistan entered the third and final Test at Lahore leading the series 1–0, having won the first Test and drawn the second.

England won the toss and elected to bat. Openers put on 101 runs for the first wicket, but England lost wickets regularly thereafter, finishing the opening day on 248/6. Five batsmen were dismissed attempting sweep shots. Paul Collingwood top-scored with 96 as England were bowled out for 288.

Pakistan began their first innings poorly, reaching lunch on the second day at 12/2 and losing a third wicket before reaching 100. Inzamam-ul-Haq helped stabilize the innings before retiring hurt with a hand injury. Mohammad Yousuf, who had been dropped on 16, continued batting throughout the third day. England took only one wicket that day, dismissing nightwatchman Shoaib Akhtar for 38.

Yousuf and Kamran Akmal shared a fifth-wicket partnership of 269 runs. Yousuf scored a career-best 223, while Akmal made 154, also his highest Test score at the time. Inzamam returned to bat on the fourth day and added further runs with the lower order before being run out for 97. Pakistan declared immediately afterward on 636/8, establishing a first-innings lead of 348 runs.

In England's second innings, Collingwood and Ian Bell put on 175 runs for the third wicket. However, England collapsed from 205/3 to 248 all out. Shoaib Akhtar took 5/71 and Danish Kaneria 4/52 as Pakistan won by an innings and 100 runs.

The victory gave Pakistan a 2–0 series win over England, who had entered the tour following their victory in the 2005 Ashes series against Australia.

== ODI series ==
=== 1st ODI ===
10 December 2005
11:00 (D/N)
Scorecard

England; 327/4 (50 overs)	v	Pakistan; 285 (46.5 overs)
Andrew Strauss 94 (98); Mohammad Sami 1/35 (7 overs)		Salman Butt 67 (65); Liam Plunkett 3/51 (9 overs)

England won by 42 runs
Gaddafi Stadium, Lahore
Umpires: Darrell Hair (Aus) and Brian Jerling (SA)
Player of the match: Andrew Strauss (Eng)

- England won the toss and elected to bat.
- Liam Plunkett (Eng) made his ODI debut

England recorded their second win on tour, and their first over Pakistan, after winning the toss and batting to set a target that was eventually too big for Pakistan to chase down. England's openers, Marcus Trescothick and Matt Prior (who played his second ODI), added 43 before Trescothick lobbed a catch to Danish Kaneria, but Prior went on to make a career-best 45 before Mohammad Sami had him out lbw. After 25 overs, England had made 131/2, but Strauss and Pietersen then added 50 in four overs before Pietersen was stumped off a wide ball from Shoaib Malik. His 56 off 39 balls, however, had brought the average English run rate above 6, and it never fell below 5.75 from then on. Though Strauss was eventually caught off Kaneria's bowling - six short of his third ODI century - Flintoff added 90 with Paul Collingwood in the last 11 overs, and England had totalled 327/4, Flintoff hitting three sixes on his way to an unbeaten 72.

However, his bowling leaked runs at a rate quicker than the target rate, with the first four overs costing 41 runs after he had come on as first change bowler for James Anderson, who had dismissed Kamran Akmal with the eleventh ball of the match. Salman Butt and Younis Khan shared a stand of 117 runs at a rate of 6.75 per over, but mid-innings England's slowest bowlers came to the fore. Ian Blackwell bowled ten overs without conceding a boundary, ending without a wicket but conceding 45 runs, while Paul Collingwood dismissed Inzamam-ul-Haq as the latter mistimed a guide to third man into the gloves of Geraint Jones who held the catch on the second attempt. With ten overs remaining, Pakistan needed 88 with six wickets in hand, with Harmison, Flintoff and ODI debutant Liam Plunkett bowling. Plunkett was the first to get a wicket, dismissing Mohammad Yousuf after an 83-run stand (off 96 balls) with Shoaib Malik, but Abdul Razzaq hit Flintoff for 11 off the four balls he faced in the next over, and with five overs remaining Pakistan needed 51. However, both the recognised batsmen were out in the next over to Plunkett, as the debutant finished with 3/51 (all caught), and Shoaib Akhtar was run out on the final ball of the over. Flintoff got two wickets in the 47th over to end the chase, but Strauss was named Man of the Match for his innings of 94, which included partnerships with every batsman except Trescothick and Collingwood. (Cricinfo scorecard)

=== 2nd ODI ===
12 December 2005
11:00 (D/N)
Scorecard

England; 230 (48.4 overs)	v	Pakistan; 231/3 (44 overs)
Liam Plunkett 56 (80); Shoaib Akhtar 5/54 (8.4 overs)		Kamran Akmal 102 (111); Andrew Flintoff 1/30 (8 overs)

Pakistan won by 7 wickets
Gaddafi Stadium, Lahore
Umpires: Darrell Hair (Aus) and Brian Jerling (SA)
Player of the match: Shoaib Akhtar (Pak)

- England won the toss and elected to bat.

Pakistan levelled the series after their wicket-keeper Kamran Akmal hit his second ODI century - indeed, his second score above 50. However, it was Shoaib Akhtar who became Man of the Match, after removing Marcus Trescothick and Andrew Strauss in the same over and coming back to take three more wickets while bowling. England had won the toss and batted first, and after an opening stand of 30 between Trescothick and Matt Prior Shoaib took two wickets in an over. Another stand of 44 took England to 74 after 13 overs, but Rana Naved-ul-Hasan repeated Shoaib's feat, and a full ball from Abdul Razzaq took care of Prior for 32.

Shoaib returned for two more wickets, and when Paul Collingwood chipped a return catch to Danish Kaneria England were 130/8 with 20 overs still to bat. They had little option but to put on their Super Sub Vikram Solanki, a specialist batsman, for bowler James Anderson - Solanki joined in with Liam Plunkett, who hit a maiden fifty in his second ODI for England, as the two shared a 100-run partnership. However, Plunkett and Steve Harmison were out in successive balls in the penultimate over, and England set a target of 230 on a pitch that had been described as "flat and perfect for batting". As it turned out, it wasn't enough - Flintoff, Harmison and Collingwood got a wicket each, but the Pakistani batsmen hit 34 boundaries in total - 138 of 231 runs - with Akmal sharing two 70+ stands, the opening with Salman Butt, and a third-wicket one with Mohammad Yousuf (who hit 28 off 68 balls) to carry Pakistan to 187/3 before he pulled a Harmison short ball to Solanki for 102. By that time, though, Pakistan needed 44 in 13.3 overs, and Inzamam-ul-Haq hit six fours in an unbeaten 31 as Pakistan made it to the target with six overs to spare. (Cricinfo scorecard)

=== 3rd ODI ===
15 December 2005
11:00 (D/N)
Scorecard

Pakistan; 353/6 (50 overs)	v	England; 188 (42 overs)
Kamran Akmal 109 (111); Liam Plunkett 2/61 (7 overs)		Ian Bell 37* (42); Shoaib Malik 3/29 (9 overs)

Pakistan won by 165 runs
National Stadium, Karachi
Umpires: Tony Hill (NZ) and Rudi Koertzen (SA)
Player of the match: Kamran Akmal (Pak)

- England won the toss and elected to field.

Kamran Akmal made his second century in three days to help Pakistan take a 2–1 lead in the series with two games to play, and their highest ODI victory by runs since their group match with Hong Kong at the 2004 Asia Cup. It was also their highest ODI win against a Full Member nation of the ICC since a 182-run win over South Africa in December 2002. England equalled their heaviest defeat ever with this loss. Pakistan were put in to bat after Marcus Trescothick won the toss, but England's bowlers did not back up the faith Trescothick had in them, not taking a wicket in the first 15 overs, before Liam Plunkett took two wickets in three balls, dismissing Younis Khan for the lowest score of the match, with 0. However, Plunkett was taken for 61 in his seven overs, and though he got the most wickets he was the least economical. Neither he nor Steve Harmison could stop the Pakistani pair of Akmal and Mohammad Yousuf, as the two added 104 in 16.2 overs before Kamran was caught off Paul Collingwood for 109. Mohammad Yousuf, who batted well for 68 off 65, was then responsible for two run-outs – his own, and that of the big-hitting Shahid Afridi, who creamed 31 off 14 balls. However, this was surpassed by Abdul Razzaq, who battered five fours and three sixes in a blazing 51 off 22 balls. At one stage, Razzaq looked poised to get the fastest ODI fifty, but some good death-over bowling from Andrew Flintoff, who was the best of the English bowlers, ensured that this at least would not happen. The Pakistan captain Inzamam-ul-Haq provided Razzaq with good support as he made 45 off 35.

When England batted, no partnership lasted more than ten overs, and after a run out and two wickets from Rana Naved-ul-Hasan in the eighth over, they failed to chase the target. England were ahead of Pakistan by runs at the 15-over mark, having made 72/3 compared to Pakistan's 71/0, but Andrew Strauss was then lbw to an inswinging ball from Mohammad Sami, and Andrew Flintoff departed three overs later, bowled by Yasir Arafat, whom he had earlier hit for three fours in an over. With two more wickets falling, England brought on Ian Bell as a substitute, and though he made an unbeaten 37, the highest score of the innings, his batting partners could not pass 20, and England were bowled out for 188 eight overs before the end. (Cricinfo scorecard)

=== 4th ODI ===
19 December 2005
11:00 (D/N)
Scorecard

Pakistan; 210 (47.2 overs)	v	England; 197 (48.1 overs)
Inzamam-ul-Haq 81* (113); Andrew Flintoff 2/20 (9 overs)		Andrew Flintoff 40 (48); Shahid Afridi 3/34 (7 overs)

Pakistan won by 13 runs
Rawalpindi Cricket Stadium, Rawalpindi
Umpires: Tony Hill (NZ) and Rudi Koertzen (SA)
Player of the match: Inzamam-ul-Haq (Pak)

- Pakistan won the toss and elected to bat.

Despite restricting Pakistan to a below par 210 on a difficult pitch to bat on, England fell 13 runs short against an efficient Pakistan bowling attack. (Cricinfo scorecard)

=== 5th ODI ===
21 December 2005
11:00 (D/N)
Scorecard

England; 206/9 (50 overs)	v	Pakistan; 200/9 (50 overs)
Vikram Solanki 49 (86); Mohammad Asif 2/14 (7 overs)		Yasir Hameed 57 (105); James Anderson 4/48 (10 overs)

England won by 6 runs
Rawalpindi Cricket Stadium, Rawalpindi
Umpires: Tony Hill (NZ) and Rudi Koertzen (SA)
Player of the match: James Anderson (Eng)

- England won the toss and elected to bat.
- Mohammad Asif (Pak) made his ODI debut.

England successfully defended an average total of 206 to win a close game by 6 runs. (Cricinfo Scorecard)
