= Iqbal Sheikh =

Iqbal Sheikh can refer to:

- Iqbal Sheikh (cricketer, born 1934) (1934-2015), Pakistani cricketer
- Iqbal Sheikh (cricketer, born 1973) (born 1973), Pakistani cricketer and umpire
