= Ashraf Ali =

Ashraf Ali may refer to:

- Ashraf Ali (cricketer, born 1958), Pakistani Test cricketer
- Ashraf Ali (cricketer, born 1979), Pakistani cricketer
- Ashraf Ali (Karachi cricketer) (born 1982), Pakistani cricketer
- Ashraf Ali, a fictional villain in the 2001 Indian film Gadar, played by Amrish Puri
- 'Ali Ashraf (c.1735–c.1780) Persian painter
