= Rauf Akbar =

Pakistani cricketer (born 1977)

Raouf Akbar
Personal information
- Full name: Raouf Akbar Hamzi Khan
- Born: 22 July 1977 (age 49); Multan, Punjab, Pakistan
- Batting: Right-handed
- Bowling: Right-arm fast-medium
- Role: Bowler

Domestic team information
- Years: Team
- Islamabad Leopards
- Rawalpindi Rams
- Rawalpindi
- Public Works Department
- Islamabad

Career statistics
Competition	First-class	List A	Twenty20
Matches	66	32	7
Runs scored	2,135	247	43
Batting average	24.54	13.72	10.75
100s/50s	1/14	0/0	0/0
Top score	116	46	19
Balls bowled	9,991	1,411	156
Wickets	228	28	11
Bowling average	23.68	43.42	18.72
5 wickets in innings	11	0	0
10 wickets in match	2	0	0
Best bowling	7/27	4/44	4/28
Catches/stumpings	30/–	8/–	2/–
- Source: Cricinfo, 1 May 2026

Raouf Akbar (born 22 July 1977) is a Pakistani former cricketer and coach. Akbar was a right-handed batsman who bowled right-arm fast-medium. He was born in Multan, Punjab, and played domestic cricket in Pakistan for Islamabad, Public Works Department, Rawalpindi, Rawalpindi Rams and Islamabad Leopards.

Akbar made his first-class debut for Islamabad in the 1997–98 Quaid-e-Azam Trophy. One of the finest bowling performances of his career came in November 2000, when he took 7 for 27 against Sheikhupura in the 2000–01 Quaid-e-Azam Trophy. He followed that with 3 for 44 in the second innings to finish with match figures of 10 for 71 as Islamabad won by 178 runs.

Akbar also developed into a useful lower-order batsman. In October 2007, playing for Islamabad against Abbottabad in the 2007–08 Quaid-e-Azam Trophy, he scored 80 in the first innings and then made 48 not out in the run chase as Islamabad won by four wickets. His highest first-class score was 116, and over the course of his senior career he made one century and fourteen half-centuries. Overall, Akbar played in 66 first-class matches, in which he took 228 wickets at a bowling average of 23.68. He took 11 five-wicket hauls and twice took ten wickets in a match.

After his playing career, Akbar moved into coaching. Later, he became a coach of the Germany national team.
