= Ghulam Mohammad (cricketer, born 1976) =

Pakistani cricketer (born 1976)

Personal information
- Born: 6 September 1976 (age 50); Dera Ismail Khan, Pakistan
- Batting: Right-handed
- Role: Wicketkeeper
- Source: Cricinfo, 12 November 2015

Ghulam Mohammad (born 6 September 1976) is a Pakistani first-class cricketer who played for the Abbottabad cricket team as a wicketkeeper-batsman.
