= Alan Jones (Scottish cricketer) =

English-born Scottish cricketer and schoolmaster

Personal information
- Full name: Fred Alan Jones
- Born: 23 February 1927; Macclesfield, Cheshire, England
- Died: 14 August 2009 (aged 82); Edinburgh, Midlothian, Scotland
- Batting: Right-handed
- Role: Wicket-keeper

Domestic team information
- Years: Team
- 1951–1952: Oxford University
- 1954–1961: Scotland
- 1954–1960: Cheshire
- 1962/63–1963/64: Hyderabad (Pakistan)

Career statistics
Competition	First-class
Matches	16
Runs scored	618
Batting average	19.93
100s/50s	0/3
Top score	88
Balls bowled	6
Wickets	0
Bowling average	–
5 wickets in innings	–
10 wickets in match	–
Best bowling	–
Catches/stumpings	12/3
- Source: Cricinfo, 28 February 2019

Fred Alan Jones (23 February 1927 – 14 August 2009) was an English-born Scottish first-class cricketer and schoolmaster.

Jones was born at Macclesfield, where he was educated at The King's School. From there, he went up to Balliol College, Oxford. While at Oxford, he made his debut in first-class cricket for Oxford University against Worcestershire at Oxford in 1951. Mentioned by The Times as one to watch at the start of both the 1951 and 1952 seasons, Jones was unable to establish himself and played just four first-class matches for Oxford.

After graduating from Oxford, Jones became a schoolmaster. Starting in 1954, he began playing first-class cricket for Scotland, debuting against Derbyshire at Buxton. 1954 also saw Jones making his debut in minor counties cricket for Cheshire, an infrequent association he would maintain until 1960, with four appearances in the Minor Counties Championship. He played first-class cricket for Scotland until 1961, making eight appearances.

Jones spent time teaching in Pakistan during the first half of the 1960s. He played first-class cricket as a wicketkeeper-batsman for Hyderabad in the Quaid-e-Azam Trophy from 1962 to 1964, making four appearances batting at No. 3 and captaining the team in his last match.

Overall, Jones played in a total of 16 first-class matches, scoring 618 runs at an average of 19.93, with a high score of 88, when he top-scored for Scotland against the touring Indians in 1959.

Jones lived the remainder of his life in Scotland, and died at Edinburgh in August 2009.
