= Arsalan Mir =

Pakistani cricketer (born 1983)

Personal information
- Born: 5 November 1983 (age 43); Lahore, Pakistan
- Source: Cricinfo, 8 November 2015

Arsalan Mir (born 5 November 1983) is a Pakistani former first-class cricketer who played for Lahore cricket team.

== Early life ==
Mir was born on November 5, 1983, in Lahore, Punjab, Pakistan.

== Career ==
Mir's began his first-class cricket career with Sialkot in the 2002–03 season. His stint continued with Sui Northern Gas Pipelines Limited, where he played from 2003–04 to 2006–07. He also represented Lahore Blues in 2004–05 and Lahore Lions in the same season. From 2005–06 to 2010–11, he played for Lahore Shalimar and was a part of Lahore Eagles from 2005–06 to 2007–08. He later played for Lahore Ravi in the 2007–08 season and represented Khan Research Laboratories in 2008–09. He also played for the Pakistan Under-19 cricket team during the 2001–02 season.

In his first-class career, Mir scored 1680 runs at an average of 23.01, with a highest score of 137, and took 49 wickets at an average of 27.18. His List A career saw him score 729 runs at an average of 31.69, with a highest score of 89, and take 30 wickets at an average of 28.70. During his Twenty20 career (2005/06-2006/07) with Lahore Eagles, he scored 119 runs at an average of 19.83, and took 3 wickets at an average of 30.00. He also represented Pakistan Under-19 cricket team in the 2001–02 season, scoring 28 runs and taking 3 wickets.

One of his notable performances came in March 2006 in the National One-day Regional Gold League against Rawalpindi Rams, when he took three wickets, including those of Mohammad Wasim and Yasir Arafat, and helped his team, the Lahore Eagles, secure a crucial five-wicket victory.

In the 2007–08 Quaid-e-Azam Trophy, Mir represented the Sui Northern Gas Pipelines Limited, which emerged as the tournament's winner.

During the 2008-2009 cricket season, Mir was a member of the Khan Research Laboratories squad that competed in the final of the Quaid-i-Azam Trophy National Cricket Championship.
