= Nasrullah Memon =

Pakistani cricketer (born 1978)

Personal information
- Born: 2 March 1978 (age 48); Shikarpur, Pakistan
- Batting: Right-handed
- Role: Wicket-keeper
- Source: Cricinfo, 28 November 2015

Nasrullah Memon (born 2 March 1978) is a Pakistani first-class cricketer who plays for Hyderabad as a wicket-keeper batsman.
