= Mohammad Naeem (cricketer, born 1990) =

Pakistani cricketer (born 1990)

Personal information
- Born: 4 September 1990 (age 36); Mardan, Pakistan
- Batting: Right-handed
- Bowling: Right-arm medium fast
- Source: Cricinfo, 28 November 2015

Mohammad Naeem (born 4 September 1990) is a Pakistani first-class cricketer who plays for Abbottabad cricket team.
