= Bilal Irshad =

Pakistani cricketer (born 1991)

Personal information
- Born: 1 February 1991 (age 35); Shikarpur, Sindh, Pakistan
- Batting: Right-handed
- Source: Cricinfo, 6 September 2018

Bilal Irshad (born 1 February 1991) is a Pakistani cricketer. He made his first-class debut for Hyderabad in the 2010–11 Quaid-e-Azam Trophy on 22 November 2010.
