= 2007–08 Quaid-e-Azam Trophy =

Cricket tournament

- Dates: 20 October 2007 – 11 January 2008
- Administrator: Pakistan Cricket Board
- Cricket format: First-class
- Tournament format(s): Two round-robin groups and final
- Host: Pakistan
- Champions: Sui Northern Gas Pipelines Limited (1st title)
- Participants: 22
- Matches: 111 (1 replayed) (Note: The Group A match between Sialkot and National Bank of Pakistan was replayed due to an unfit pitch; it is not counted twice here.)
- Official website: www.pcb.com.pk

The 2007–08 Quaid-e-Azam Trophy was one of two first-class domestic cricket competitions that were held in Pakistan during the 2007–08 season. It was the 50th edition of the Quaid-e-Azam Trophy, contested by 22 teams representing regional cricket associations and departments, (Note: The top level of domestic cricket in Pakistan was historically played by teams representing regional cricket associations and departments, which were owned and run by corporations, institutions or government departments.) and was followed in the schedule by the Pentangular Cup, contested by five teams representing the four provinces and the federal areas.

There were substantial changes from the previous season, with the regions and departments being merged into a single competition by the Pakistan Cricket Board. The previous four (and 15 of the preceding 17) seasons had seen them compete in separate competitions, regions in the Quaid-e-Azam Trophy and departments in the Patron's Trophy. The 22 teams, thirteen regions and nine departments, were divided into two groups; four-day matches in the group stage were played in a round-robin between 20 October and 29 December 2007, with the top team in each group contesting the five-day final from 7 to 11 January 2008 to determine the winner.

The final round of group matches were disrupted by the assassination of Benazir Bhutto, former prime minister of Pakistan. All in-progress matches were suspended and after initially indicating that they would be resumed or replayed, the Pakistan Cricket Board later decided that the results would stand.

Sui Northern Gas Pipelines Limited (SNGPL) won the Quaid-e-Azam Trophy for the first time by defeating Habib Bank Limited in the final; the match resulted in a draw, with SNGPL emerging victorious by virtue of securing a first-innings lead.

== Group stage ==
The top teams in the round-robin group stage (highlighted) advanced to the final.

Group A
| Team | Pld | W | L | D | A | Pts |
|---|---|---|---|---|---|---|
| Habib Bank Ltd. | 10 | 7 | 1 | 2 | 0 | 66 |
| National Bank of Pakistan | 10 | 6 | 0 | 3 | 1 | 60 |
| Water and Power Dev. Auth. | 10 | 4 | 0 | 5 | 1 | 42 |
| Lahore Ravi | 10 | 4 | 3 | 3 | 0 | 39 |
| Multan | 10 | 3 | 3 | 4 | 0 | 30 |
| Faisalabad | 10 | 2 | 2 | 6 | 0 | 30 |
| Sui Southern Gas Corp. | 10 | 2 | 3 | 4 | 1 | 24 |
| Karachi Whites | 10 | 2 | 2 | 6 | 0 | 21 |
| Sialkot | 10 | 1 | 5 | 3 | 1 | 15 |
| Pakistan Customs | 10 | 0 | 7 | 3 | 0 | 6 |
| Hyderabad | 10 | 0 | 5 | 5 | 0 | 3 |

Group B
| Team | Pld | W | L | D | A | Pts |
|---|---|---|---|---|---|---|
| Sui Northern Gas Pipelines Ltd. | 10 | 7 | 1 | 2 | 0 | 66 |
| Pakistan International Airlines | 10 | 5 | 0 | 5 | 0 | 48 |
| Islamabad | 10 | 4 | 3 | 3 | 0 | 42 |
| Zarai Taraqiati Bank Ltd. | 10 | 3 | 2 | 5 | 0 | 36 |
| Khan Research Labs. | 10 | 3 | 1 | 6 | 0 | 36 |
| Rawalpindi | 10 | 1 | 2 | 7 | 0 | 24 |
| Lahore Shalimar | 10 | 2 | 4 | 4 | 0 | 18 |
| Abbottabad | 10 | 1 | 3 | 6 | 0 | 18 |
| Peshawar | 10 | 1 | 4 | 5 | 0 | 15 |
| Karachi Blues | 10 | 1 | 5 | 4 | 0 | 12 |
| Quetta | 10 | 0 | 3 | 7 | 0 | 3 |

Position determined by total points, most matches won, fewest matches lost, followed by adjusted net run rate (matches with no result, i.e. those where both teams did not complete their first innings, were disregarded); matches finishing in a draw were decided on first innings scores, with points awarded as follows:
- Win = 9 points
- Win having tied or trailed on first innings = 6 points
- Draw having led on first innings = 3 points
- Loss, draw having trailed or with no result on first innings, or abandoned without a ball bowled = 0 points

== Final ==
7–11 January 2008
Scorecard

| Sui Northern Gas Pipelines Limited | v | Habib Bank Limited |
| 351 (98.5 overs); Mohammad Hafeez 69 (137); Kamran Hussain 4/99 (26.5 overs) | | 192 (62.1 overs); Hasan Raza 50 (95); Asad Ali 5/67 (22.1 overs) |
| 304/9d (91.4 overs); Misbah-ul-Haq 161 (272); Kamran Hussain 4/41 (13 overs) | | 166/1 (29.4 overs); Kamran Hussain 89 (99); Mohammad Hafeez 1/49 (8.4 overs) |

Match drawn; SNGPL won on first innings
National Stadium, Karachi
Umpires: Saleem Badar and Zameer Haider

- Habib Bank Limited won the toss and elected to field.
- No play was possible on day two due to rain.
