= Riaz Kail =

Pakistani cricketer (born 1988)

Personal information
- Born: 10 November 1988 (age 38); Peshawar, Pakistan
- Batting: Right-handed
- Bowling: Right arm offbreak
- Source: Cricinfo, 8 November 2015

Riaz Kail (born 10 November 1988) is a Pakistani first-class cricketer who played for Abbottabad cricket team.
