= Hanif-ur-Rehman =

Pakistani cricketer (born 1976)

Personal information
- Born: 31 March 1976 (age 50); Moro, Pakistan
- Batting: Right-handed
- Bowling: Right-arm off-break
- Source: ESPNcricinfo, 11 November 2015

Hanif-ur-Rehman (born 31 March 1976) is a Pakistani former first-class cricketer who played for Hyderabad cricket team.
