= Fakhar Hussain =

Pakistani cricketer (born 1978)

Personal information
- Born: 8 July 1978 (age 48); Gujrat, Pakistan
- Source: Cricinfo, 12 November 2015

Fakhar Hussain (born 8 July 1978) is a Pakistani first-class cricketer who played for Islamabad cricket team.
