= Iqbal Shaikh =

Pakistani cricketer (1934–2015)

Personal information
- Full name: Iqbal Hussain Shaikh
- Born: 10 September 1934; Karachi, Pakistan
- Died: 9 January 2015 (aged 80); Hyderabad, Sindh
- Batting: Right-handed
- Bowling: Legbreak Googly
- Source: Cricinfo, 25 March 2016

Iqbal Hussain Shaikh (10 September 1934 – 9 January 2015) was a Pakistani cricketer. He played first-class cricket for Hyderabad, National Bank of Pakistan and Sind in twenty-two first-class cricket matches between 1956–57 and 1970–71.

Dr Iqbal Shaikh died in Hyderabad, Sindh at the age of 80.
