= Nasir Jalil (cricketer) =

Pakistani cricketer (born 1978)

Personal information
- Born: 13 April 1978 (age 48); Abbottabad, Pakistan
- Batting: Right-handed
- Bowling: Right arm bowler
- Relatives: Qanita Jalil (sister)
- Source: Cricinfo, 11 November 2015

Nasir Jalil (born 13 April 1978) is a Pakistani first-class cricketer who played for Abbottabad cricket team. He is the brother of Pakistani woman cricketer Qanita Jalil.
