= Zahoor Ahmed =

Pakistani cricketer (born 1987)

Personal information
- Born: 28 February 1987 (age 39); Quetta, Pakistan
- Source: Cricinfo, 11 November 2015

Zahoor Ahmed (born 28 February 1987) is a Pakistani first-class cricketer who played for Quetta cricket team.
