= Shehzad Butt =

Pakistani cricketer (born 1974)

Personal information
- Born: 4 February 1974 (age 52); Lahore, Pakistan
- Source: Cricinfo, 10 November 2015

Shehzad Butt (born 4 February 1974) is a Pakistani first-class cricketer who played for Lahore cricket team.
