= Sufyan Munir =

Pakistani cricketer (born 1980)

Personal information
- Full name: Sufyan Munir
- Born: 3 July 1980 (age 46); Gujrat, Pakistan
- Source: Cricinfo, 8 November 2015

Sufyan Munir (born 3 July 1980) is a Pakistani first-class cricketer who played for Islamabad cricket team.
