= Wajid Ali (Pakistani cricketer) =

Pakistani cricketer (born 1981)

Personal information
- Born: 12 January 1981 (age 45); Karachi, Pakistan
- Batting: Right-handed
- Source: Cricinfo, 11 November 2015

Wajid Ali (born 12 January 1981) is a Pakistani first-class cricketer who played for the Abbottabad cricket team.
