= Cricket season =

Time of year when organized cricket is played

Top-class cricket is almost always played outdoors, on uncovered pitches, and rain prevents play, so the seasons in each country are geared to coincide with the driest months of the year. The hours of daylight and the temperature are also factors in some countries. For example, in England the winter days are too short and often too dark, and the temperature is too low, for playing cricket to be practical. Normally, cricket is played outdoors but in the UK, cricket is played indoors when the season is finished, see Indoor cricket (UK variant), NOT the 8-a-side game played in other parts of the World like Australia and South Africa.

== Designation ==
When designating cricket seasons, the common convention is to use a single year for a Northern Hemisphere summer season, and a dashed pair of years to indicate a Southern Hemisphere summer. Hence, 1948 for the English summer season and 1948–49 for the Australian summer that followed some months later. In the tropics, the designation depends on when the cricket is played. One convention is to use a single year if the season begins in April to September, and a pair of years if the season begins in October to March.

== Off-Season ==
In the United Kingdom, the cricket season starts mid-April and ends in September, whereas in Australia, the cricket season begins in October and ends in February or March.
