= Naved Ashraf =

Pakistani cricketer (born 1974)

Personal information
- Full name: Mohammad Naved Ashraf Qureshi
- Born: 4 September 1974 (age 52); Rawalpindi, Punjab, Pakistan
- Batting: Right-handed
- Bowling: Right-arm medium

International information
- National side: Pakistan
- Test debut (cap 155): 10 December 1998 v Zimbabwe
- Last Test: 12 March 2000 v Sri Lanka

Career statistics
Competition	Test	First-class
Matches	2	140
Runs scored	64	6,612
Batting average	21.33	29.91
100s/50s	0/0	8/35
Top score	32	184
Balls bowled	–	1,127
Wickets	–	12
Bowling average	–	54.66
5 wickets in innings	–	0
10 wickets in match	–	0
Best bowling	–	2/17
Catches/stumpings	0/–	72/–
- Source: Cricinfo, 11 June 2017

Mohammad Naved Ashraf Qureshi (born 4 September 1974) is a Pakistani cricketer. He is a right-handed batsman and a right-arm medium-pace bowler.

Ashraf has played in two Test matches. He also had a minor foray into Twenty20 cricket.
