= Alamgir Khan (cricketer) =

Pakistani cricketer (born 1978)

Personal information
- Born: 18 August 1978 (age 48); Rawalpindi, Pakistan
- Source: Cricinfo, 8 November 2015

Alamgir Khan (born 18 August 1978) is a Pakistani first-class cricketer who played for Rawalpindi cricket team.
