= Rasheed Bhatti =

Pakistani cricketer (born 1952)

Personal information
- Born: 2 May 1952 (age 74); Lahore, Pakistan
- Source: Cricinfo, 10 November 2015

Rasheed Bhatti (born 2 May 1952) is a Pakistani former first-class cricketer who played for Lahore cricket team. Later he became an umpire and stood in matches in the 2005–06 ABN-AMRO Twenty-20 Cup.
