= Taimur Khan (Khyber Pakhtunkhwa cricketer) =

Pakistani cricketer (born 1975)

Mohammad Taimur Khan (born 1 May 1975 in Peshawar, Pakistan) is a Pakistani cricketer. He is a right-handed batsman and right-arm fast-medium bowler. To date, he has played 90 first-class and 76 List A matches for various teams in Pakistan. Whilst he has yet to play Test cricket or One Day Internationals for Pakistan, he did represent them in the 1998 Commonwealth Games.

He scored 15 centuries and 25 fifties during his career.
