= Naeem-ur-Rehman =

Pakistani cricketer (born 1982)

Personal information
- Born: 6 August 1982 (age 44); Mardan, Pakistan
- Batting: Right-handed
- Bowling: Right-arm medium fast
- Source: ESPNcricinfo, 9 November 2015

Naeem-ur-Rehman (born 6 August 1982) is a Pakistani first-class cricketer who played for Hyderabad cricket team.
