= Kamran Sajid =

Pakistani cricketer (born 1983)

Personal information
- Born: 22 December 1983 (age 42); Lahore, Pakistan
- Source: Cricinfo, 8 November 2015

Kamran Sajid (born 22 December 1983) is a Pakistani first-class cricketer who played for Lahore cricket team.
