= Faisal Naved =

Pakistani cricketer (born 1980)

Personal information
- Born: 2 March 1980 (age 46); Sialkot, Pakistan
- Batting: Right-handed
- Bowling: Right-arm medium
- Source: Cricinfo, 8 November 2015

Faisal Naved (born 2 March 1980) is a Pakistani first-class cricketer who played for Sialkot cricket team.
