= Nauman Alavi =

Pakistani cricketer (born 1986)

Personal information
- Born: 23 August 1986 (age 40); Karachi, Pakistan
- Source: Cricinfo, 10 November 2015

Nauman Alavi (born 23 August 1986) is a Pakistani first-class cricketer who played for Karachi cricket team.
