= Adil Nisar =

Pakistani cricketer

Personal information
- Full name: Adil Nisar
- Born: 1 June 1978 (age 48); Lahore, Punjab, Pakistan
- Batting: Left-handed
- Bowling: Leg break
- Role: Batsman

Domestic team information
- Years: Team
- 1995/96: Lahore City
- 1997/98: Islamabad
- 1997/98–2011/12: Water and Power Development Authority
- 1998/99–2001/02: Hyderabad
- 2003/04: Lahore
- 2004/05–2005/06: Quetta
- 2004/05–2005/06: Quetta Bears

Career statistics
Competition	First-class	List A	Twenty20
Matches	116	93	5
Runs scored	6,519	3,065	57
Batting average	35.62	36.48	11.40
100s/50s	10/32	5/17	0/0
Top score	232*	131*	26
Balls bowled	2,470	1,525	48
Wickets	27	44	5
Bowling average	46.07	29.15	13.40
5 wickets in innings	0	0	0
10 wickets in match	0	0	0
Best bowling	4/27	4/28	4/21
Catches/stumpings	103/–	47/–	1/–
- Source: Cricinfo, 13 April 2026

Adil Nisar (born 1 June 1978) is a Pakistani former cricketer. Nisar was a left-handed batsman who bowled leg break. He was born in Lahore, Punjab.

Nisar played Pakistani domestic cricket from the 1995/96 season to the 2011/12 season. He made his first-class debut for Lahore City in 1995/96, later representing Islamabad, Water and Power Development Authority (WAPDA), Hyderabad, Lahore and Quetta in first-class cricket. In limited-overs cricket, he played mainly for Water and Power Development Authority and also represented Quetta Bears in List A and Twenty20 matches. He also represented Pakistan Under-19s in Under-19 Tests and Under-19 ODIs between 1994/95 and 1996/97.

By the early 2000s, Nisar was captaining WAPDA in one-day cricket. In March 2003, he scored 96 in WAPDA's semi-final victory over Khan Research Laboratories in the NBP One-day Cup, sharing a third-wicket partnership of 179 with Rizwan Malik. In December 2003, he made an unbeaten 143 against Bangladesh A in the Patron's Trophy. During the 2005/06 Patron's Trophy, he scored an unbeaten 232 against Service Industries, the highest first-class score of his career.
