= Mohammad Bilal =

Pakistani cricketer (born 1975)

Personal information
- Full name: Mohammad Bilal Marwat
- Born: 8 April 1975 (age 51); Lakki Marwat, Pakistan
- Batting: Right-handed
- Bowling: Legbreak
- Source: Cricinfo, 8 November 2015

Mohammad Bilal (born 8 April 1975) is a Pakistani first-class cricketer who played for Abbottabad cricket team.
