= Hameedullah Khan =

Pakistani cricketer (born 1984)

Personal information
- Born: 1 March 1984 (age 42); Peshawar, Pakistan
- Source: Cricinfo, 9 November 2015

Hameedullah Khan (born 1 March 1984) is a Pakistani first-class cricketer who played for Quetta cricket team.
