= Hammad Ali =

Pakistani cricketer (born 1990)

Personal information
- Born: 11 September 1990 (age 36); Swabi, Pakistan
- Batting: Right-handed
- Bowling: Right-arm medium
- Source: Cricinfo, 11 November 2015

Hammad Ali (born 11 September 1990) is a Pakistani first-class cricketer who played for Abbottabad cricket team.
