= Akhtar Ayub =

Pakistani cricketer (born 1987)

Personal information
- Full name: Akhtar Ayub Awan
- Born: 10 December 1987 (age 38); Langar, Attock, Punjab, Pakistan
- Batting: Right-handed
- Bowling: Right-arm medium-fast
- Role: Bowler

Domestic team information
- Years: Team
- 2006/07–present: Khan Research Laboratories
- 2005/06–2006/07: Rawalpindi Rams
- FC debut: 3 November 2006 Khan Research Laboratories v Pakistan International Airlines
- Last FC: 26 December 2007 Khan Research Laboratories v Rawalpindi
- LA debut: 21 March 2006 Rawalpindi Rams v Faisalabad Wolves
- Last LA: 17 March 2007 Khan Research Laboratories v Pakistan International Airlines

Career statistics
Competition	FC	LA	T20
Matches	12	8	2
Runs scored	100	27	7
Batting average	16.66	9.00	–
100s/50s	0/0	0/0	0/0
Top score	33	15	7*
Balls bowled	1,488	316	24
Wickets	26	8	2
Bowling average	30.57	35.50	14.00
5 wickets in innings	0	0	0
10 wickets in match	0	0	0
Best bowling	4/72	3/44	1/10
Catches/stumpings	2/–	0/–	1/–
- Source: CricketArchive, 3 January 2007

Akhtar Ayub (born 10 December 1987) is a Pakistani cricketer.

He played for Pakistan in the 2006 U-19 Cricket World Cup in Sri Lanka, which Pakistan won by defeating India in the final. In the low-scoring final match, Ayub claimed three wickets for just nine runs in the 2.5 overs he bowled. Along with Anwar Ali (5 for 35), Ayub was instrumental in skittling out India for just 71 runs inside 19 overs.

He made his first-class debut for Khan Research Laboratories against Pakistan International Airlines at Rawalpindi in November 2006. He has also played in List A and Twenty20 matches for the Rawalpindi Rams.
