= Iqbal Butt =

Pakistani cricketer (born 1956)

Personal information
- Born: 23 November 1956 (age 69); Peshawar, Pakistan
- Source: Cricinfo, 8 November 2015

Iqbal Butt (born 23 November 1956) is a Pakistani umpire and former first-class cricketer. A left-handed batsman and slow left-arm spin bowler, Iqbal Butt played for Peshawar cricket team and National Bank of Pakistan. He later became an umpire and stood in matches in the 2005–06 ABN-AMRO Twenty-20 Cup.
