= Ijaz Hussain =

Pakistani cricketer (1942–2022)

Personal information
- Born: 7 April 1942; Muzaffarnagar, United Provinces of Agra and Oudh, British India
- Died: 2 October 2022 (aged 80)
- Nickname: Khapra
- Batting: Right-handed
- Bowling: Right-arm medium, leg-spin
- Role: Wicketkeeper-batsman

Domestic team information
- Years: Team
- 1956-57 – 1959-60: Bahawalpur
- 1961-62 – 1962-63: Multan
- 1963-64 – 1967-68: Railways
- 1968-69 – 1969-70: Public Works Department
- 1969-70 – 1975-76: National Bank

Career statistics
Competition	First-class
Matches	81
Runs scored	4476
Batting average	33.65
100s/50s	8/18
Top score	173
Balls bowled	751
Wickets	16
Bowling average	25.00
5 wickets in innings	1
10 wickets in match	0
Best bowling	5/37
Catches/stumpings	119/38
- Source: CricketArchive, 31 March 2017

Syed Ijaz Hussain (7 April 1942 – 2 October 2022), also known as Ijaz Khapra, was a Pakistani cricketer who played first-class cricket in Pakistan from 1957 to 1976. He represented Pakistan in the 1960s but did not play Test cricket.

== Early life ==
Syed Ijaz Hussain was born in 1942 in what is now Uttar Pradesh. Prior to India's partition in 1947, his father moved the family to Bahawalpur, where he worked as a road inspector. Following his father's death in the late 1950s, Ijaz, the eldest of seven, assumed additional responsibilities. His cricket skills were noticed at Government Technical High School in Bahawalpur. Despite being initially interested in hockey, a leg injury steered him towards cricket. A serious incident, when he was thrown from a train by classmates, resulted in a head injury that nearly ended his sporting career. After he left school he went to Multan in 1960 to work in a textile mill.

== Cricket career ==
Hussain was a wicketkeeper-batsman who usually opened the innings. He could also bowl medium-pace and wrist-spin. His highest score was 173 in an innings victory for Railways Reds over Lahore Reds in 1965-66.

Hussain toured England with the Pakistan Eaglets in 1963, playing in three of the eight first-class matches. He played two matches for Pakistan against the touring Ceylon team in 1966-67, and all three matches for Pakistan Under-25 against MCC Under-25 later that season. He also played for Pakistan against The Rest (of Pakistan) in 1969-70.

== Later life ==
Hussain worked for the National Bank of Pakistan in the 1970s before moving to Sharjah, where he was among a group of Pakistani cricketers who developed the game in the United Arab Emirates. He was employed there in industry and banking. He retired in 2004 and returned to live in Karachi. He died in October 2022.
