= Rizwan Saeed =

Pakistani cricketer (born 1978)

Personal information
- Born: 14 March 1978 (age 48); Karachi, Pakistan
- Source: Cricinfo, 8 November 2015

Rizwan Saeed (born 14 March 1978) is a Pakistani first-class cricketer who played for Karachi cricket team.
