= Ghulam Murtaza (cricketer) =

Pakistani cricketer (born 1980)

Personal information
- Born: 10 March 1980 (age 46)
- Batting: Right-handed
- Source: Cricinfo, 12 November 2015

Ghulam Murtaza (born 10 March 1980) is a Pakistani first-class cricketer who played for Hyderabad cricket team.
