= Saeed Anwar (Punjab cricketer) =

Pakistani cricketer (born 1978)

Personal information
- Full name: Mohammad Saeed Anwar
- Born: 12 December 1978 (age 47); Burewala, Punjab, Pakistan
- Nickname: Saeed Anwar Jnr
- Batting: Left-handed
- Bowling: Slow left-arm orthodox
- Role: Batter

Domestic team information
- Years: Team
- 1997/98–2012/13: Multan
- 1998/99: Water and Power Development Authority
- 1999/00–2018/19: Khan Research Laboratories
- 2000/01: Rawalpindi
- 2004/05–2013/14: Multan Tigers
- 2007/08–2011/12: Baluchistan
- 2016: Gazi Group Cricketers
- Last FC: 25 September 2018 Khan Research Laboratories v Lahore Whites
- Last LA: 30 September 2018 Khan Research Laboratories v Lahore Whites

Career statistics
| Competition | First-class | List A | Twenty20 |
|---|---|---|---|
| Matches | 226 | 159 | 40 |
| Runs scored | 12512 | 5537 | 690 |
| Batting average | 34.85 | 41.32 | 23.79 |
| 100s/50s | 29/58 | 10/38 | 0/3 |
| Top score | 197 | 166 | 73 |
| Balls bowled | 11295 | 6485 | 438 |
| Wickets | 141 | 148 | 12 |
| Bowling average | 33.69 | 34.15 | 47.00 |
| 5 wickets in innings | 2 | 0 | 0 |
| 10 wickets in match | 0 | 0 | 0 |
| Best bowling | 5/14 | 4/34 | 3/22 |
| Catches/stumpings | 112/– | 59/– | 6/– |
- Source: ESPNCricinfo, 5 July 2026

Saeed Anwar (born 12 December 1978) is a Pakistani former cricketer. Anwar was a left-handed batsman who bowled slow left-arm orthodox. He was born in Burewala, Punjab. He is also known as Saeed Anwar Jnr, to distinguish him from the former Pakistan international Saeed Anwar.

Anwar represented Pakistan Under-19s in Youth Tests and Youth One Day Internationals in 1996/97 and 1997/98, and later also played for Pakistan A.

Anwar made his debut for Multan in List A cricket in the 1997/98 Pakistani season. In the same season, he made his first-class debut for Multan. He later played first-class and List A cricket for Water and Power Development Authority, Khan Research Laboratories and Rawalpindi, and also represented Baluchistan in first-class cricket. He made his Twenty20 debut for Multan Tigers against Faisalabad Wolves in the ABN-AMRO Twenty-20 Cup on 25 February 2006.

During his domestic career, Anwar also represented Rest of Punjab, The Rest and Gazi Group Cricketers.

Anwar established himself as a prolific batter in domestic cricket. In October 2002, playing for Khan Research Laboratories in the Quaid-e-Azam Trophy, he was dismissed for 93, missing a century by seven runs against Pakistan International Airlines. In December 2013, he scored 197 for Khan Research Laboratories against Pakistan International Airlines in the President's Trophy. A few days later, in the 2013–14 President's Cup One Day Tournament, he made 36 from 30 balls and took four wickets in a win over Pakistan International Airlines.

In November 2014, Anwar scored 113 for Khan Research Laboratories against Hyderabad Hawks in the 2014–15 Quaid-e-Azam Trophy as his side won by an innings and 51 runs.

Anwar played 226 first-class, 159 List A and 40 Twenty20 matches between the 1997/98 and 2018/19 seasons. He scored 12,512 runs in first-class cricket, including 29 centuries, and also took 141 wickets in the format.
