= Ahmed Said (cricketer) =

Pakistani cricketer (born 1976)

Personal information
- Born: 15 April 1976 (age 50); Mardan, Pakistan
- Batting: Right-handed
- Role: Wicketkeeper
- Source: Cricinfo, 11 November 2015

Ahmed Said (born 15 April 1976) is a Pakistani former first-class cricketer who played for Abbottabad cricket team.

== Biography ==
Ahmed Said was born on 15 April 1976 in Mardan, Pakistan. He was a right-handed batter and wicket-keeper. His cricket career involved several teams, beginning with Rawalpindi in List A cricket from 1997–98 to 1999–00 and in first-class cricket from 1999–00 to 2000–01. Subsequently, he played for the Water and Power Development Authority, Peshawar, Abbottabad, the Abbottabad Rhinos, the Abbottabad Falcons, and finally Khyber Pakhtunkhwa.

During his first-class career spanning 1999–00 to 2015–16, Said played in 116 matches. His batting statistics included 3996 runs, with a top score of 113 not out. He held an average of 24.21, made 6 centuries and 16 half-centuries. As a wicketkeeper, he took 375 catches and 23 stumpings.

In List A cricket from 1997–98 to 2013–14, Said played 68 matches. He scored 1114 runs with a high score of 67 and maintained the same batting average of 24.21. He made 6 half-centuries with a strike rate of 60.15. As a wicketkeeper, he took 88 catches and 16 stumpings.
