= Pir Zulfiqar =

Pakistani cricketer (born 1984)

Personal information
- Born: 3 January 1984 (age 42); Dadu, Pakistan
- Batting: Left-handed
- Bowling: Slow left-arm orthodox
- Source: Cricinfo, 11 November 2015

Pir Zulfiqar (born 3 January 1984) is a Pakistani first-class cricketer who played for the Hyderabad cricket team.
