= Afsar Nawaz =

Pakistani cricketer

Personal information
- Full name: Afsar Nawaz Khan
- Born: 7 October 1976 (age 50); Karachi, Sindh, Pakistan
- Batting: Right-handed
- Bowling: Right-arm medium
- Role: Batsman

Career statistics
Competition	First-class	List A	Twenty20
Matches	94	50	21
Runs scored	5,689	1,252	410
Batting average	37.42	32.10	24.11
100s/50s	10/31	2/4	0/3
Top score	178*	119*	71*
Balls bowled	1,098	873	92
Wickets	22	24	5
Bowling average	33.27	29.37	24.80
5 wickets in innings	0	0	0
10 wickets in match	0	0	0
Best bowling	3/19	3/27	2/6
Catches/stumpings	121/6	15/1	15/6
- Source: Cricinfo, 13 April 2026

Afsar Nawaz Khan (born 7 October 1976) is a Pakistani former cricketer. Nawaz was a right-handed batsman who bowled right-arm medium and also kept wicket. He was born in Karachi, Sindh.

Nawaz played Pakistani domestic cricket from the 1996/97 season to 2013, representing Karachi Blues, Karachi Dolphins, Karachi Harbour, Karachi Urban, Pakistan Customs, Public Works Department and State Bank of Pakistan. During the 2005 PCB Inter-district Senior Cricket Championship, he scored centuries in successive matches for Old Karachi Zone, including 103 against Liaquatabad-Gulshan Zone.

In the 2005/06 Patron's Trophy, Nawaz helped Pakistan Customs save a draw against Habib Bank Limited by scoring 83 in the second innings. In the one-day phase of the same competition, he made 67 in a successful run chase against Khan Research Laboratories, then followed that with successive centuries, scoring 103 against Pakistan International Airlines and 119 against Habib Bank. His 119 against Habib Bank remained his highest score in List A cricket.

In the 2007–08 Quaid-e-Azam Trophy, Nawaz scored 108 and took 3 wickets for 19 runs for Karachi Whites against Hyderabad. Two seasons later, captaining Karachi Whites against National Bank of Pakistan, he made an unbeaten 106 in the Quaid-e-Azam Trophy.

Overall, Nawaz played 94 first-class matches. In these, he scored 5,689 runs and scored 10 centuries. His highest score was an unbeaten 178 runs innings.
