= Mohammad Siddiq (cricketer) =

Pakistani cricketer (born 1979)

Personal information
- Born: 20 March 1979 (age 47); Peshawar, Pakistan
- Batting: Right-handed
- Bowling: Right arm Fast medium
- Source: Cricinfo, 10 November 2015

Mohammad Siddiq (born 20 March 1979) is a Pakistani first-class cricketer who played for Abbottabad cricket team.
