= Kashif Shafi =

Pakistani cricketer (born 1976)

Personal information
- Born: 14 January 1976 (age 50); Lahore, Pakistan
- Source: Cricinfo, 8 November 2015

Kashif Shafi (born 14 January 1976) is a Pakistani first-class cricketer who played for Lahore cricket team.
