= Taj Wasan =

Pakistani cricketer (born 1988)

Personal information
- Full name: Taj Wasan
- Born: 23 October 1988 (age 38); Mirpur Khas, Sindh, Pakistan
- Batting: Right-handed
- Bowling: Right arm medium
- Source: Cricinfo, 12 November 2015

Taj Wasan (born 23 October 1988) is a Pakistani first-class cricketer who played for the Hyderabad cricket team.
