= Majid Majeed =

Pakistani cricketer (born 1983)

Personal information
- Born: 7 September 1983 (age 43); Bahawalnagar, Pakistan
- Batting: Left-handed
- Bowling: Right arm Offbreak
- Source: Cricinfo, 8 November 2015

Majid Majeed (born 7 September 1983) is a Pakistani first-class cricketer who played for Bahawalpur cricket team.
