= Sabir Hussain =

Pakistani cricketer (born 1983)

Personal information
- Born: 15 March 1983 (age 43); Quetta, Pakistan
- Source: Cricinfo, 9 November 2015

Sabir Hussain (born 15 March 1983) is a Pakistani first-class cricketer who played for Quetta cricket team.
