= Zafar Jadoon =

Pakistani cricketer (born 1972)

Personal information
- Born: 1 December 1972 (age 53); Abbottabad, Pakistan
- Batting: Right-handed
- Bowling: Legbreak
- Source: Cricinfo, 8 November 2015

Zafar Jadoon (born 1 December 1972) is a Pakistani first-class cricketer who played for Abbottabad cricket team.
