= Safdar Niazi =

Pakistani cricketer (born 1982)

Personal information
- Born: 11 June 1982 (age 44); Ahmadpur East, Pakistan
- Batting: Right-handed
- Bowling: Right arm Offbreak
- Source: Cricinfo, 8 November 2015

Safdar Niazi (born 11 June 1982) is a Pakistani-born cricketer who represented the United Arab Emirates national cricket team. He played for various teams in Pakistan including Islamabad cricket team.
