= Siddiq Khan (umpire) =

Pakistani cricket umpire (1947–2007)

Personal information
- Born: 2 March 1947; Delhi, India
- Died: 21 October 2007 (aged 60); Lahore, Pakistan

Umpiring information
- ODIs umpired: 5 (1990–1995)
- Source: Cricinfo, 25 May 2014

Siddiq Khan (2 March 1947 – 21 October 2007) was a Pakistani cricket umpire. He mainly officiated in first-class fixtures at the domestic level. Khan also stood in five One Day International (ODI) games from 1990 to 1995.

== See also ==
- List of One Day International cricket umpires
