= Ali Naqvi (cricketer) =

Pakistani cricketer (born 1977)

Syed Ali Urooj Naqvi
Personal information
- Born: 19 March 1977 (age 49); Lahore, Punjab, Pakistan, Pakistan
- Batting: Right-handed
- Bowling: Right-arm offbreak

International information
- National side: Pakistan (1997–1998)
- Test debut (cap 145): 6 October 1997 v South Africa
- Last Test: 21 March 1998 v Zimbabwe

Career statistics
| Competition | Test | First-class |
|---|---|---|
| Matches | 5 | 116 |
| Runs scored | 242 | 5,898 |
| Batting average | 30.20 | 34.90 |
| 100s/50s | 1/0 | 14/24 |
| Top score | 115 | 180 |
| Balls bowled | 11 | 6,484 |
| Wickets | 0 | 102 |
| Bowling average | – | 28.50 |
| 5 wickets in innings | – | 1 |
| 10 wickets in match | – | 0 |
| Best bowling | – | 5/65 |
| Catches/stumpings | 1/– | 50/– |
- Source: ESPNCricinfo, 11 June 2017

Syed Ali Urooj Naqvi (Urdu: سید علی عروج نقوی) (born 19 March 1977) is a Pakistani former cricketer who played five Tests for the national team from 1997 to 1998. A right-handed batsman, he scored his only Test century (115) in his debut Test, against South Africa at Rawalpindi in 1997 in which another debutant Azhar Mahmood also scored a century; the two became the only debutant pair to score a century in the same Test. He was a regular part-time off spin bowler at first-class level.
