= Dilawar Khan (Pakistani cricketer) =

Pakistani cricketer (born 1984)

Personal information
- Born: 23 May 1984 (age 42); Peshawar, Pakistan
- Batting: Right-handed
- Bowling: Legbreak
- Source: Cricinfo, 8 November 2015

Dilawar Khan (born 23 May 1984) is a Pakistani first-class cricketer who played for Abbottabad cricket team.
