= Afzaal Ahmed =

Pakistani cricketer and umpire (1948–2015)

Personal information
- Full name: Syed Afzaal Ahmed Rizvi
- Born: 25 December 1948; Karachi, Pakistan
- Batting: Right-handed
- Bowling: Right-arm Medium fast
- Role: Umpire

Domestic team information
- Years: Team
- Karachi
- Karachi University
- National Bank of Pakistan
- Public Works Department
- Sindh

Umpiring information
- ODIs umpired: 1 (1994)
- WODIs umpired: 2 (2001–2004)

Career statistics
Competition	FC	LA
Matches	91	6
Runs scored	4,010	257
Batting average	30.61	42.83
100s/50s	6/20	1/1
Top score	155*	129
Balls bowled	1,806	8
Wickets	33	0
Bowling average	25.90	–
5 wickets in innings	1	0
10 wickets in match	0	0
Best bowling	5/21	–
Catches/stumpings	51/–	1/–
- Source: ESPNcricinfo, 24 June 2023

Afzaal Ahmed Rizvi (25 December 1948 – 23 April 2015) was a Pakistani first-class cricketer and umpire. He mainly officiated in domestic cricket matches, only umpiring in a single One Day International (ODI).

Born in Karachi, Afzaal, a tall right-handed batsman, played 91 first-class matches between 1965–66 and 1984–85, scoring 4,010 runs at an average of 30.61 with an unbeaten 155 being the highest of his six centuries. As a medium-paced bowler, he claimed 33 wickets at an average of 25.90. His best bowling figures in an innings were 5-21.

Afzaal stood in his only ODI as an umpire in October 1994 between Pakistan and South Africa at Faisalabad.

== See also ==
- List of One Day International cricket umpires
