= Shehzad Malik =

Pakistani cricketer (born 1978)

Personal information
- Born: 8 April 1978 (age 48); Sialkot, Pakistan
- Batting: Right-handed
- Bowling: Right arm medium
- Role: Batsman
- Source: Cricinfo, 8 November 2015

Shehzad Malik (born 8 April 1978) is a Pakistani former first-class cricketer who played for the Sialkot cricket team.
