= Farhan Ayub =

Pakistani cricketer (born 1985)

Personal information
- Born: 27 March 1985 (age 41); Hyderabad, Pakistan
- Batting: Left-handed
- Bowling: Left-arm medium-fast
- Source: Cricinfo, 27 September 2023

Farhan Ayub (born 27 March 1985) is a Pakistani first-class cricketer who played for Hyderabad cricket team, most recently in 2014.
