= Tahir Mughal =

Pakistani cricketer (1977–2021)

Personal information
- Full name: Tahir Mahmood Mughal
- Born: 25 April 1977; Daska, Punjab, Pakistan
- Died: 10 January 2021 (aged 43); Sialkot, Punjab, Pakistan
- Batting: Right-handed
- Bowling: Right-arm medium-fast
- Role: All-rounder

Domestic team information
- Years: Team
- Agriculture Development Bank of Pakistan
- Gujranwala Cricket Association
- Lahore Badshahs
- Sialkot Cricket Association

Career statistics
| Competition | FC | LA | T20 |
|---|---|---|---|
| Matches | 112 | 84 | 26 |
| Runs scored | 3202 | 1109 | 413 |
| Batting average | 20.92 | 22.18 | 22.94 |
| 100s/50s | 1/13 | 1/4 | 0/2 |
| Top score | 130* | 118* | 94 |
| Balls bowled | 20,212 | 3,739 | 275 |
| Wickets | 502 | 88 | 10 |
| Bowling average | 21.64 | 33.85 | 36.40 |
| 5 wickets in innings | 39 | – | – |
| 10 wickets in match | 8 | – | – |
| Best bowling | 7/50 | 3/26 | 2/22 |
| Catches/stumpings | 49/– | 27/– | 3/– |
- Source: ESPNcricinfo, 28 July 2021

Tahir Mahmood Mughal (Urdu: طاہر مغل; 25 April 1977 – 10 January 2021) was a Pakistani cricketer. He was a right-handed batsman and a medium-fast bowler.

== Career ==
Mughal's career began with Gujranwala, for whom he began playing in the 1997/98 Quaid-e-Azam Trophy season. Mughal was the most frequent Gujranwala player in the competition, batting in seven of the nine matches played and in twelve innings. During this season he bowled two five-wicket innings, and made his first ten-wicket haul, against Lahore City, finishing with match figures of 10/112, achieved in his second first-class match. Of the Gujranwala players who finished the season's competition with a better average, only one had bowled half as many balls.

Mughal played one match in the 1998/99 Quaid-e-Azam Trophy for Gujranwala prior to their next big competition, the PCB Patron's Trophy. Having played his final game for the team in the competition, a draw against Faisalabad, he switched teams in October 1998, moving to the Agriculture Development Bank of Pakistan. Mughal had previously played for ADBP during their 1997/98 run in the Wills Cup, and although he saw them past the group stages, the team did not make it through to the knockout rounds. The team, although winless in the previous season, went undefeated and finished top of the 1998/99 table. Tahir finished the season with another half-century, despite being pushed down the batting line-up. However, in the final, ADBP underperformed, and lost in an innings defeat by Habib Bank Limited.

Mughal's second chance with Gujranwala saw him debut in the lower-middle order, making a steady innings of 25, despite the team finishing the game close to an innings defeat. He finished the season having scored one half-century, and making five catches as an outfielder. He moved back to ADBP for the 2000/01 season, though he only played one game, in the PCB Trophy. The 2002/03 season saw him move to Sialkot, for whom he debuted in December 2002 against his old team, Gujranwala, having played earlier in the same season for the PCB Whites in the One-day Ramadan Cup. Despite his experience, he only lasted two seasons with Sialkot, though he took three five-wicket hauls during his debut 2002/03 campaign. The team finished in second place in the 2003/04 Trophy table, and, at the end of the 2004 season, Mughal moved to England in search of a first-class county.

His search brought him to Durham, who agreed to sign him at the beginning of the season, however, along with team-mate and fellow overseas player Pallav Kumar, and with competition from eight other debutantes in that season alone, he failed to make an impression and was out of the team after just a single game. He moved back to Pakistan and played in the Patron's Trophy competition of 2004/05 for an Allied Bank Limited team which finished in third position in Group A. The following season, he played in the final of the Quaid-e-Azam trophy, once again representing Sialkot, and, thanks to a century from team-mate Shahid Yousuf, and a sudden batting collapse from opponents Faisalabad, Sialkot finished with an innings victory.

Mughal began 2006 with Pakistan Telecommunication Company Limited, who finished top of their group in the 2005/06 table, and finished the 2005/06 season with Sialkot. At the beginning of the 2006/07 season, he started playing for the National Bank of Pakistan. Over his career, he has played 96 first-class matches, delivering 18,203 balls and conceding 9,843 runs. He has taken 453 wickets at an average of 21.72, with an economy rate of 3.24 and a strike rate of 40.1. His best bowling figures in an innings are 7/50.. He has 35 five wicket hauls in an innings and 7 ten wicket haul in a match.

== Death ==
Mughal was diagnosed with stage IV gallbladder cancer in December 2020. On 10 January 2021, he died in Sialkot at the age of 43.
