= Rajesh Ramesh =

Pakistani cricketer (born 1982)

Personal information
- Full name: Rajesh Ramesh
- Born: 2 July 1982 (age 44); Karachi, Sind, Pakistan
- Batting: Right-handed
- Bowling: Right-arm fast-medium
- Role: Bowler

Domestic team information
- Years: Team
- Karachi
- 2001/02–2002/03: Public Works Department
- 2007/08–2015/16: Sui Southern Gas Corporation

Career statistics
Competition	First-class	List A	Twenty20
Matches	67	30	3
Runs scored	982	130	11
Batting average	12.75	8.12	–
100s/50s	1/2	0/0	0/0
Top score	100	29*	8*
Balls bowled	11,512	1,263	54
Wickets	242	25	2
Bowling average	28.00	50.60	50.50
5 wickets in innings	10	0	0
10 wickets in match	1	0	0
Best bowling	6/48	4/36	2/35
Catches/stumpings	21/–	7/–	1/–
- Source: Cricinfo, 1 May 2026

Rajesh Ramesh (born 2 July 1982) is a Pakistani former cricketer. Ramesh was a right-handed batsman who bowled right-arm fast-medium. He was born in Karachi, Sind, and played domestic cricket in Pakistan for Karachi sides, the Public Works Department and Sui Southern Gas Corporation.

Ramesh first appeared in Pakistan domestic cricket at the start of the 2000s and developed into a durable seam bowler for Karachi and Public Works Department. In the 2002–03 Quaid-e-Azam Trophy, playing for Public Works Department against Karachi Whites, he took 5 for 91 in the first innings at the National Stadium.

His most notable bowling performance came for Karachi Whites against Lahore Blues in the 2004–05 Quaid-e-Azam Trophy. He took a career-best 6 for 48 in the first innings and then 4 for 58 in the second, finishing with match figures of 10 for 106 as Karachi Whites won by 166 runs at Gaddafi Stadium, Lahore.

Although primarily a bowler, Ramesh also produced one notable innings with the bat. In the 2005–06 Quaid-e-Azam Trophy, playing for Karachi Harbour, he scored his only first-class century, making exactly 100 against Abbottabad at Islamabad. Batting at number ten, he shared a ninth-wicket partnership of 218 with Fawad Alam, who remained unbeaten on 128, helping Karachi Harbour to 351 in the first innings and eventually a 38-run victory.

Later, representing Sui Southern Gas Corporation, Ramesh remained an effective new-ball bowler. In a Patron's Trophy Grade-II semi-final against Pakistan Television in November 2006, he took 5 for 83 in the first innings. Earlier that month, he had also helped Sui Southern Gas to a nine-wicket win over Dewan Farooq Motors by taking 3 for 30 in the second innings.

Overall, Ramesh played in 67 first-class matches, taking 242 wickets at a bowling average of 28.00, with ten five-wicket hauls and one ten-wicket match. He also scored 982 runs, including one century and two half-centuries. In List A cricket, he played 30 matches and took 25 wickets, while in three Twenty20 matches he took two wickets.
