= National Bank of Pakistan Sports Complex =

Sport complex in Karachi, Pakistan

- NBP Sports Complex
- Location: Street 5, Block 4, Clifton, Karachi, Pakistan
- Owner: National Bank of Pakistan
- Operator: National Bank of Pakistan
- Surface: Grass (cricket ground)
- Acreage: 5.5-acre (2.2 ha)

Construction
- Opened: 1998 (cricket ground); 2008 (sports complex)
- Architect: NESPAK

Tenant
- National Bank of Pakistan cricket team (formerly)

The National Bank of Pakistan Sports Complex, commonly shortened to NBP Sports Complex, is a multi-sport complex in Block 4 of Clifton, Karachi, Pakistan. Owned and operated by the National Bank of Pakistan, the 2.2-hectare (5.5-acre) site contains a first-class cricket ground and academy as well as indoor facilities for racket sports, cue sports, swimming and physical training. Formerly, it was the home ground of National Bank of Pakistan cricket team.

The complex is distinct from National Bank Stadium, the international cricket stadium formerly known as National Stadium, Karachi, whose naming rights were acquired by NBP in 2022.

== History ==
NBP established its cricket team in 1954, added hockey and football teams by 1966 and created a dedicated sports department in 1974. The cricket ground at the present complex was in use by 1998. Its first recorded first-class fixture began on 29 November that year, when National Bank played Khan Research Laboratories in the 1998–99 Patron's Trophy. The venue was also staging national junior cricket by 2002.

The wider sports complex was built in 2008. The complex was an architectural project of National Engineering Services Pakistan.

The ground has continued to stage development and domestic cricket. It was used for the Quaid-e-Azam Trophy in 2020–21 and for the first-class President's Trophy in 2025–26.

It has staged the NBP Ranking Snooker Championship by 2012 and subsequently hosted the 48th, 49th and 50th National Snooker Championships from 2024 through 2026. The complex also hosted the 2023 National Junior Badminton Championship, conducted by the Sindh Badminton Association and Pakistan Badminton Federation.

== Facilities ==
Facilities at the complex include:

- NBP cricket ground
- two squash courts
- indoor tennis and badminton facilities
- indoor swimming pool
- snooker and billiards arena
- table-tennis hall
- fitness centre

The facilities are available on a membership or fee-paying basis to its employees and their families, local residents and the general public.

== See also ==
- List of cricket grounds in Pakistan
- List of sports venues in Karachi
