= Azhar Shafiq =

Pakistani cricketer (born 1978)

Mohammad Azhar Shafiq (born 31 December 1978 in Sadiqabad, Punjab, Pakistan) is a Pakistani former cricketer. He is a left-handed batsman and a right-arm medium pace bowler. He has played 131 first-class and 60 List A matches for various teams in Pakistan. He represented Pakistan at the 1998 Commonwealth Games.
