= Ashraf Ali (cricketer, born 1979) =

Pakistani cricketer

Personal information
- Born: 4 April 1979 (age 47); Lahore, Pakistan
- Source: Cricinfo, 8 November 2015

Ashraf Ali (born 4 April 1979) is a Pakistani first-class cricketer who played for the Abbottabad cricket team.

== Biography ==
Born on April 4, 1979, Ali's cricket career spans multiple teams and formats.

Ali began with the Lahore Blues in List A cricket from 2000 to 2002, later moving to Lahore's first-class team in 2003–04, and back to Lahore Blues in 2004–05. Concurrently, he played for the Khan Research Laboratories in both First-Class and List A cricket in 2004–05. His 2005–06 season was split between Abbottabad in First-Class cricket, Service Industries in the same format, and Abbottabad Rhinos in both Twenty20 and List A cricket. From 2006 to 2007, Ali joined Lahore Shalimar and the Lahore Eagles, transitioning to Lahore Ravi in 2007-08 where he remained until 2011. He also played List A cricket with the Lahore Lions in the 2008–09 season.

In his First-Class career (2003–11), Ali played 51 matches, scoring 2731 runs with an average of 35.46, including 8 centuries and 13 half-centuries. His List A career (2000–08) includes 29 matches with 892 runs at an average of 44.60, including one century and five half-centuries. In the 2005-06 Twenty20 season with the Abbottabad Rhinos, Ali played 5 matches, scoring 62 runs with an average of 20.66.
