= Saad Wasim =

Pakistani cricketer (born 1975)

Personal information
- Full name: Syed Saad Wasim
- Born: 28 July 1975 (age 51); Karachi, Pakistan
- Role: Karachi team captain
- Source: Cricinfo, 10 November 2015

Saad Wasim (born 28 July 1975, Karachi, Sindh) is a Pakistani first-class cricketer who played for Karachi cricket team. He played as the captain for the Karachi Cricket Team. He was a right hand batsman, Saad Wasim has previously coached the former Pakistani team captain "Sarfaraz Ahmed".

== Early career ==
Saad Wasim played for the Karachi blues in the 1990s, Since a young age Saad Wasim showed a keen interest in cricket.

== Late career ==
Saad Wasim retired from cricket in the 2000s.
