= Najaf Shah =

Pakistani cricketer

Personal information
- Full name: Najaf Shah
- Born: 17 December 1984 (age 41); Gujjar Khan, Pakistan
- Height: 6 ft 4 in (193 cm)
- Batting: Left-handed
- Bowling: Left-arm fast
- Role: Bowling

International information
- National side: Pakistan
- ODI debut: 22 May 2007 v Sri Lanka
- Source: CricInfo, 15 August 2022

Najaf Shah (Urdu: نجف شاہ, born 17 December 1984) is a Pakistani former cricketer who played for Rawalpindi region and Pakistan International Airlines and various international franchise leagues. He played his first One Day International game against Sri Lanka in Abu Dhabi, UAE in 2007. He is a left-arm medium-fast bowler with the ability to bat in the lower order. He has played 134 first-class cricket matches and taken over 477 wickets, with a career best of 7 for 57 for Pakistan International Airlines against National Bank of Pakistan in the semi-final of the Patron's Trophy in 2004–05. Currently, Najaf lives in Dallas, Texas, USA.

== Early and personal life ==
Najaf belongs to Gujar Khan. He started his early cricketing career at school level with taped tennis ball, it is quite normal in this part of world to start with tape/tennis ball rather than full cricket gear. Through initial school competitions he was spotted to be high potential talent. After completion of school education he took admission in Sarwar Shaheed College in intermediate level. He was selected captain of college cricket team, which under his captaincy won some major tournaments. In 2000-01 he moved to Rawalpindi from Gujar Khan for higher education. After moving to Rawalpindi he joined Gull Cricket Club and that was a turning point of his career and started cricket as a professional.

== Playing career ==
=== Pakistan national domestic matches ===
Najaf Shah has been playing First-class cricket in Pakistan since 2001. He has played for various teams but his major teams are Rawalpindi region and Pakistan International Airlines . He has contributed to PIA and Rawalpindi cricket team success and his performances over the years helped the teams to win some of the major domestic championships title.

In February 2003, PIA won the championship title against Khan Research Laboratories cricket team, in final match Najaf grabbed 5 wickets, again In 2004 /2005 ABN-AMRO trophy PIA shared championship title with HBL in rain affected final match and Najaf was declared best bowler of the tournament.

2014/15 season was also a good season for him, he was declared best bowler of Quaid-e-Azam Trophy grabbing up 42 wickets in 8 matches with the best Avg 15.19 per wicket

=== International matches and tours ===
Najaf's international career started through ICC Under-17 Asia Cup, held in Pakistan during the 2000/2001 cricket season. He played for Pakistan U-19 and Pakistan A for a few years. In 2007, he was selected for Pakistan Cricket Academy team to tour Bangladesh for a tri-series tournament involving Bangladesh and Sri Lanka. The tour helped him make a strong case for national selectors as he took 9 wicket in 4 one-day matches in the tri series most by any bowler and then 16 wickets in two four day matches against Bangla Dash again most by any bowler and Pakistan Academy team won both matches team.

International Matches and Tours
Year	Team	Vs	Venue (Country)
2009	PCB Patron's XI	Sri Lanka	Pakistan
2007	Pakistan A	Australia A	Pakistan
2007	Pakistan	Sri Lanka	UAE
2007	Pakistan Cricket Academy	Sri Lanka / Bangladesh Cricket Academy	Bangladesh
2005	Pakistan A	Australia A	Pakistan
2005	PCB Patron's XI	West Indies	Pakistan
2005	PCB Patron's XI	England	Pakistan
2005	Pakistan Cricket Academy	South Africa Cricket Academy	Pakistan
2005	Pakistan A	Namibia	Namibia
2005	Pakistan A	Zimbabwe	Zimbabwe
2004	Pakistan A	Sri Lanka A	Sri Lanka
2003	Pakistan A	UAE	UAE
2000	Pakistan U-17	ICC Under-17 Asian Cup	Pakistan

=== International cricket leagues and tournaments ===
International Tournaments
Year	Team	Tournaments	Country
2016	US All Stars	US Open T20 Tournament Florida	USA
2016	Smart Choice World XI	Diversity T20 Cup Michigan	USA
2016	Grand Rapids CC	Midwest Cricket Conference League Chicago	USA
2016	Virginia Cricket Club	Washington Cricket League	USA
2015	Chicago Gymkhana Cricket Club	Midwest Cricket Conference League - Unity Cup Chicago	USA
2013	Wirksworth Cricket Club	Derbyshire Cricket League	England
2009	Kidsgrove Cricket Club	North Staffordshire South Cheshire Cricket League	England
2008	Barlaston Cricket Club	North Staffordshire South Cheshire Cricket League	England
2006	Ashcombe Park Cricket Club	North Staffordshire South Cheshire Cricket League	England
2005	Burslem Cricket Club	North Staffordshire South Cheshire Cricket League	England
2004	Burslem Cricket Club	North Staffordshire South Cheshire Cricket League	England

== Other contributions ==
Cricket talent selection duties, Najaf has been supporting regional selection committee to find fast bowlers for region and Pakistan

=== TV cricket analyst ===
Najaf is also well known cricket analyst in Pakistan, he is currently signed by Pakistan Television Corporation and Kay2 TV to cover major cricket events. Recently he has covered Pakistan Super League but in past he has been covering ICC tournaments
