= Umar Javed =

Pakistani cricketer (born 1983)

Personal information
- Born: 10 November 1983 (age 43); Quetta, Pakistan
- Source: Cricinfo, 10 November 2015

Umar Javed (born 10 November 1983) is a Pakistani former cricketer who played for Lahore cricket team. He played in 39 first-class and 19 List A matches between 2001 and 2009.
