= Zafar Iqbal (umpire) =

Pakistani cricketer and umpire (born 1947)

Personal information
- Born: 22 November 1947 (age 78); Rawalpindi, Pakistan

Umpiring information
- ODIs umpired: 1 (2000)
- Source: Cricinfo, 26 May 2014

Zafar Iqbal Pasha Siddiqi (born 22 November 1947) is a former cricketer and umpire from Pakistan. Siddiqi mainly umpired at the first-class level in domestic fixtures. At the international level, he has only officiated in a single One Day International game, in 2000.

== See also ==
- List of One Day International cricket umpires
