= Shoaib Khan (cricketer, born 1985) =

Pakistani cricketer (born 1985)

Personal information
- Full name: Shoaib Khan
- Born: 13 April 1985 (age 41); Bostan, Balochistan, Pakistan
- Nickname: Naam
- Batting: Left-handed
- Bowling: Right-arm medium-fast

International information
- National side: Pakistan
- T20I debut (cap 24): 10 October 2008 v Canada
- Last T20I: 13 October 2008 v Sri Lanka

Domestic team information
- Years: Team
- 2006–: Quetta Bears
- 2004–: State Bank of Pakistan

Career statistics
Competition	T20I	FC	LA	T20
Matches	4	65	33	22
Runs scored	65	3,695	878	533
Batting average	16.25	31.58	27.43	24.22
100s/50s	0/1	7/13	0/7	0/5
Top score	50	185	75	85
Balls bowled	–	286	218	45
Wickets	–	3	6	4
Bowling average	–	70.66	34.83	18.25
5 wickets in innings	–	0	0	0
10 wickets in match	–	0	0	0
Best bowling	–	1/11	3/28	3/36
Catches/stumpings	1/–	56/–	7/–	7/–
- Source: ESPNCricinfo, 10 December 2013

Shoaib Khan (born 13 April 1985) is a left-handed Pakistani batsman who played for Quetta Bears and played four international Twenty20 matches for Pakistan in the Al-Barkah Twenty20 Tournament. He averages 16.25 with the bat with the strike rate of 81 in International Twenty20. In February 2021, he began to undertake coaching courses with the Pakistan Cricket Board.
