= Mohammad Fayyaz =

Pakistani cricketer (born 1984)

Personal information
- Born: 19 October 1984 (age 42); Peshawar, Pakistan
- Source: Cricinfo, 8 November 2015

Mohammad Fayyaz (born 19 October 1984) is a Pakistani first-class cricketer who played for Peshawar cricket team.
