= Sajid Shah =

Pakistani cricketer (born 1974)

Syed Sajid Shah (born October 19, 1974 in Mardan) is a Pakistani first-class cricketer. A right-arm fast-medium bowler, Shah debuted in 1993/94 and has since taken over 500 first-class wickets. In 2002 he was fined by the Pakistan Cricket Board for ball tampering during a domestic one-day match.
