= Faisal Athar =

Pakistani cricketer (born 1975)

Personal information
- Full name: Faisal Athar
- Born: Hyderabad, Sindh, Pakistan
- Batting: Right-handed
- Bowling: Right-arm medium
- Role: Batsman; occasional wicket-keeper

Career statistics
Competition	ODI	FC	LA	T20
Matches	1	126	64	20
Runs scored	9	7,180	2,020	453
Batting average	9.00	34.85	34.82	30.20
100s/50s	0/0	0/0	1/14	0/3
Top score	9	171	102*	66*
Balls bowled	–	1,418	138	12
Wickets	–	13	3	3
Bowling average	–	72.53	46.33	2.33
5 wickets in innings	–	0	0	0
10 wickets in match	–	0	0	0
Best bowling	–	3/40	2/59	3/7
Catches/stumpings	0/–	79/–	25/4	2/4
- Source: ESPNcricinfo, 20 December 2013

Faisal Athar (Urdu: فیصل اطہر; born 15 October 1975) is a Pakistani former cricketer. He played as a right-handed batsman and right-arm medium-pace bowler, who would also occasionally keep wickets. He played one One-Day International in 2003 for the losing Pakistani side in the final of the Bank Alfalah Cup of 2003, where he opened the batting.

He has played extensively in the Quaid-e-Azam Trophy since debuting in the competition for Hyderabad in 1999. He has also participated in the Tissot Cup, the National Bank of Pakistan Cup (for the Pakistan National Shipping Corporation as well as the Public Works Department), and, in 2005, the ABN-AMRO Cup, where his Hyderabad team lost to the Duckworth-Lewis method against the Lahore Lions.

Most recently, he has played in the 2005/06 Pentangular Cup tournament for the National Bank of Pakistan.
