= Shakeel-ur-Rehman =

Pakistani cricketer (born 1982)

Personal information
- Born: 1 June 1982 (age 44); Peshawar, Pakistan
- Batting: Right-handed
- Bowling: Right-arm medium
- Source: ESPNcricinfo, 8 November 2015

Shakeel-ur-Rehman (born 1 June 1982) is a Pakistani first-class cricketer who played for the Abbottabad cricket team.
