= Faisal Irfan =

Pakistani cricketer (born 1979)

Personal information
- Born: 28 February 1979 (age 47); Quetta, Pakistan
- Source: Cricinfo, 9 November 2015

Faisal Irfan (born 28 February 1979) is a Pakistani first-class cricketer who played for Quetta cricket team.
