= Bilal Asad =

Pakistani cricketer (born 1978)

Personal information
- Born: 17 November 1978 (age 47); Jhang, Pakistan
- Batting: Right-handed
- Bowling: Right-arm medium
- Source: Cricinfo, 28 February 2020

Bilal Asad (born 17 November 1978) is a Pakistani former cricketer and current coach. He played 121 first-class, 75 List A and 9 Twenty20 matches between 1995 and 2006 for various teams.

He has also coached Singapore national cricket team and Malaysia national cricket team.
