= Saleem Badar =

Pakistani cricket umpire (born 1953)

Personal information
- Full name: Muhammad Saleem Badar
- Born: 16 May 1953 (age 73); Karachi, Pakistan

Umpiring information
- Tests umpired: 5 (1988–1998)
- ODIs umpired: 29 (1988–2002)
- Source: Cricinfo, 15 July 2013

Saleem Badar (born 16 May 1953) is a former international cricket umpire from Pakistan. Besides umpiring in numerous domestic matches, he officiated in five Test matches from 1988 to 1998 and 29 ODI games from 1988 to 2002. He was also one of the on-filed umpires in the final of the 2007–08 Quaid-e-Azam Trophy.

== See also ==
- List of Test cricket umpires
- List of One Day International cricket umpires
