= Asim Kamal =

Pakistani cricketer (born 1976)

Asim Kamal Urdu: عاصم کمال
Personal information
- Full name: Asim Kamal
- Born: 31 May 1976 (age 50); Karachi, Pakistan
- Batting: Left-handed
- Bowling: Right-arm offbreak

International information
- National side: Pakistan
- Test debut (cap 180): 17–21 October 2003 v South Africa
- Last Test: 29 November 2005 v England

Career statistics
Competition	Test	FC	LA	T20
Matches	12	84	36	8
Runs scored	717	4,467	850	151
Batting average	37.73	37.53	31.48	25.16
100s/50s	0/8	8/28	0/6	0/0
Top score	99	164	63	49
Balls bowled	–	114	12	–
Wickets	–	2	–	–
Bowling average	–	38.00	–	–
5 wickets in innings	–	0	–	–
10 wickets in match	–	0	–	–
Best bowling	–	1/6	–	–
Catches/stumpings	10/–	69/–	12/–	0/–
- Source: Cricinfo, 23 December 2013

Asim Kamal (born 31 May 1976) is a Pakistani former cricketer who played for the Pakistan national cricket team between 2003 and 2005.

He scored 99 against South Africa on his Test debut. Kamal has played 12 Tests (20 innings) since his debut. Kamal has made 87 against Australia, and a 91, and 73 against India. Kamal has scored 8 half-centuries. He has also taken 10 catches.
