= Kamran Hussain =

Pakistani cricketer (born 1977)

Personal information
- Full name: Mohammad Kamran Hussain
- Born: 9 May 1977 (age 49); Bahawalpur, Punjab, Pakistan
- Batting: Right-handed
- Bowling: Left-arm medium

International information
- National side: Pakistan (2008)
- ODI debut (cap 162): 27 January 2008 v Zimbabwe
- Last ODI: 30 January 2008 v Zimbabwe

Domestic team information
- Years: Team
- 1995/96–2015/16: Bahawalpur
- 2000/01–2001/02: Water and Power DA
- 2003/04–2004/05: Pakistan Customs
- 2003/04–2011/12: Multan
- 2005/06–2014/15: Habib Bank
- 2007/08–2008/09: Baluchistan

Career statistics
Competition	ODI	FC	LA	T20
Matches	2	160	115	47
Runs scored	28	5,909	1,997	672
Batting average	–	25.03	24.35	24.88
100s/50s	–	5/35	0/10	0/1
Top score	28*	156	94*	66
Balls bowled	102	21,798	4,583	839
Wickets	3	464	109	36
Bowling average	22.33	24.53	33.17	28.88
5 wickets in innings	0	19	1	0
10 wickets in match	0	2	0	0
Best bowling	2/32	7/25	5/51	4/23
Catches/stumpings	0/–	64/–	30/–	19/–
Medal record
Men's Cricket
Representing Pakistan
South Asian Games
Bronze medal – third place	2010 Dhaka	Team
- Source: CricketArchive, 26 January 2025

Mohammad Kamran Hussain (born 9 May 1977) is a Pakistani cricket coach and former international cricketer who played two One Day Internationals for Pakistan national cricket team in January 2008 during a home series against Zimbabwe. He played domestic cricket between 1995–96 and 2015–16 and made over 300 senior appearances for a number of teams in Pakistan.

== Early life and education ==
Kamran Hussain was born on 9 May 1977 in Bahawalpur, Punjab. He later completed a Level-2 coaching course at the Pakistan Cricket Board National Cricket Academy in January 2025.

== Career ==
Hussain was named in Pakistan's One Day Internationals (ODIs) squad for the opening matches of the 2008 series against Zimbabwe. He made his ODI debut on 27 January 2008 at Multan Cricket Stadium, where he scored 28 not out and took wickets late in Zimbabwe's chase as Pakistan won the match and went 3-0 up in the series. In the fourth ODI at Faisalabad on 30 January 2008, he took early wickets to reduce Zimbabwe to 12 for 2. This match was his final international appearance.

He continued to play domestic cricket in Pakistan, representing Bahawalpur in first-class matches. In February 2013, he scored centuries in both innings of a first-class match for Bahawalpur against Karachi Whites at Multan Cricket Stadium, helping his side recover from a precarious position in the second innings.

In 2020, he joined the Pakistan women's cricket team high performance camp as an assistant coach. In August 2023, he was appointed bowling coach for Pakistan's home series against South Africa, replacing Saleem Jaffar.
