= Iftikhar Malik =

Pakistani cricketer (born 1949)

Iftikhar Malik (born 10 November 1949) was a Pakistani cricketer who played for the Water and Power Development Authority (WAPDA) team. He was born in Lahore.

Malik made two first-class appearance for the team, in 1978 and 1979. In the four innings in which he batted, he scored 40 runs, and, from 100 overs of bowling, took 8 wickets.

He was also a cricket umpire. He stood in one ODI game in 1993.

Malik's brother, Ijaz, played first-class cricket between 1960 and 1979.

== See also ==
- List of One Day International cricket umpires
