= Zameer Haider =

Pakistani former cricket umpire

Zameer Haider Syed ضميرحيدر
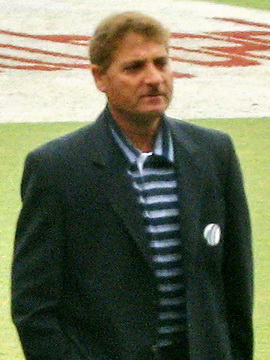

Personal information
- Full name: Zameer Haider Syed
- Born: 30 September 1962 (age 64); Lahore, Pakistan
- Nickname: Zimi

Umpiring information
- ODIs umpired: 15 (2006–2012)
- T20Is umpired: 12 (2008–2013)
- WODIs umpired: 5 (2015–2018)
- WT20Is umpired: 3 (2018)
- Source: ESPNcricinfo, 20 November 2011

Zameer Haider (Urdu: ضميرحيدر; born 30 September 1962, Lahore) is a former international cricket umpire from Pakistan. He also played first-class cricket during the 1980s. An occasion wicket-keeper, Haider was a right-handed batsman and right-arm off-break bowler.

== Background and education ==
Haider comes from a family of athletes. His father, Syed Khadim Hussain, played hockey for Pakistan Railways. Haider studied at Government Mian Iqbal Hussain High School, Garhi Shahu, Lahore, and completed his matriculation in 1976. He graduated from Islamia College at a time when champion fast bowler Wasim Akram and future fellow umpire Aleem Dar were also studying there.

== International umpiring career ==
Haider started his domestic cricket umpiring career in 1998 for Pakistan Cricket Board (PCB). He made his debut as an international umpire in 2006, when he supervised a match between Pakistan and West Indies at Multan Cricket Stadium. He stood in his first Twenty20 International in 2008 in a match between Pakistan and Bangladesh at National Stadium, Karachi. He got a contract from PCB along with Ahsan Raza and Shozab Raza in 2012.

== See also ==
- List of One Day International cricket umpires
- List of Twenty20 International cricket umpires
