= Hyderabad cricket team (Pakistan) =

Pakistani cricket team

Hyderabad is a first-class cricket team based in Hyderabad, Sindh, Pakistan. Their home ground is the Niaz Stadium. In first-class cricket they participate in the Quaid-e-Azam Trophy. For Twenty20 and List A cricket tournaments in the National T20 Cup and National One-day Championship they are known as the Hyderabad Hawks.

== Playing record ==
Hyderabad made their first-class debut in 1958–59 and played in most seasons until 2015–16. They returned to first-class cricket when the Quaid-e-Azam Trophy was revamped in 2024–25. At the end of the 2024–25 season they had played 189 first-class matches, with 26 wins, 98 losses and 65 draws. They have usually been one of the weaker Pakistan teams. They reached the quarter-finals of the Quaid-e-Azam Trophy in 1968–69, the quarter-finals of the BCCP Trophy in 1971–72, and the final of the Quaid-e-Azam Trophy Silver League in 2005–06.

Their highest individual score is 208, by Bashir Shana against Public Works Department in 1973–74. Their best bowling figures are 7 for 50 by Maqsood Hussain against Hyderabad Education Board in 1964–65. Hussain took 13 for 91 in the same match, Hyderabad's best match figures.

== Other teams ==
In 1969-70 Hyderabad fielded two teams, Hyderabad Whites and Hyderabad Blues. Each side played two matches in the Quaid-e-Azam Trophy. Hyderabad Whites lost both their matches, and Hyderabad Blues lost one and drew one.

== See also ==
- List of Hyderabad cricketers (Pakistan)
