= Abbottabad cricket team =

Cricket team

Abbottabad
Personnel
- Captain: (Pakistan) Mohammad Haris
- Coach: (Pakistan) Sajjad Akbar

Team information
- Colours: Brown and grey
- Home ground: Abbottabad Cricket Stadium
- Capacity: 4,000

The Abbottabad cricket team, is a Pakistani first-class cricket team from Abbottabad. Beginning with the 2024–25 season, it participates in Pakistan's first-class, List A and Twenty20 competitions. Their home ground is the Abbottabad Cricket Stadium in Pakistan. The team played in the Quaid-i-Azam Trophy competition, making their first-class debut in the 2005–06 season. The Abbottabad Falcons played in Twenty20 and List A domestic cricket tournaments till 2015-16 seasons.

== See also ==
- List of Abbottabad cricketers
