= 2017–18 Quaid-e-Azam Trophy =

Cricket tournament

- Dates: 26 September 2017 – 25 December 2017
- Administrator: Pakistan Cricket Board
- Cricket format: First-class
- Tournament format(s): Two round-robin group stages and final
- Host: Pakistan
- Champions: SNGPL (4th title)
- Participants: 16
- Matches: 69
- Most runs: Saad Ali (957)
- Most wickets: Aizaz Cheema (60)
- Official website: www.pcb.com.pk

The 2017–18 Quaid-e-Azam Trophy was the 60th edition of the Quaid-e-Azam Trophy, Pakistan's domestic first-class cricket competition. It was contested by 16 teams representing eight regional associations and eight departments, (Note: The top level of domestic cricket in Pakistan was historically played by teams representing regional cricket associations and departments, which were owned and run by corporations, institutions or government departments.) and took place from 26 September to 25 December 2017, spanning almost two weeks less than originally planned. Pakistan's former Test captain Misbah-ul-Haq was critical of the compressed schedule and the quality of the pitches saying "it takes time to prepare a good pitch for a game and nobody can make it in two days".

The format of the competition remained the same as the previous season, with two round-robin group stages and a final. The regions and departments were divided evenly between the two groups for the preliminary group stage, with the four top teams in each advancing to a "Super Eight" group stage; the top team in each of the Super Eight groups contested the final. In a change from 2016–17, the Pakistan Cricket Board (PCB) introduced a draft system for the regional teams.

Sui Northern Gas Pipelines Limited beat defending champions Water and Power Development Authority by 103 runs to win the Quaid-e-Azam Trophy for the third time in four years.

== Draft ==
With the aim of improving the competitiveness of the regional associations, partly by distributing experienced players among them, proposals for the introduction of a draft system were presented to the PCB's governing board on 28 July 2017. The draft system gained approval after initial objections from some of the larger associations, led by Karachi, and a compromise was reached on the number of players to be selected via the draft. Each regional team selected eight players via the draft, ten through the normal selection process along with two emerging players from the under-19 circuit. The teams completed their player selection on 6 September 2017.

== Competition summary ==
Faisalabad and Pakistan Television made their returns to first-class competition after winning the Quaid-e-Azam Trophy and Patron's Trophy Grade-II competitions respectively in 2016–17; they replaced the relegated Pakistan International Airlines (PIA) and Karachi Blues in the competition. Like the previous season, both promoted teams enjoyed only a brief stay in the top-tier as they were relegated at the end of the season.

In Pool A, Sui Northern Gas Pipelines Limited, Sui Southern Gas Company, Lahore Blues and Water and Power Development Authority all progressed to the Super Eight section of the tournament. They were joined by United Bank Limited, Habib Bank Limited, Khan Research Laboratories and Lahore Whites from Pool B.

On 26 November 2017, the dates for the first round of the Super Eight fixtures were postponed by the PCB, due to ongoing religious unrest which had also disrupted the fixture schedule for the 2017–18 National T20 Cup. The Super Eight round was originally scheduled to start on 29 November 2017, but this was moved back to 3 December 2017.

Sui Northern Gas Pipelines Limited won Group 1 of the Super Eight round, beating Lahore Blues by six wickets to advance to the final. In the match, the first three innings were each completed without a side scoring three figures, the first time this had ever happened in the Quaid-e-Azam Trophy. Water and Power Development Authority won Group 2, despite losing to Sui Southern Gas Corporation by seven wickets in their final match.

In the final, Sui Northern Gas Pipelines Limited beat Water and Power Development Authority by 103 runs to win the competition for the third time in the last four years. Samiullah Khan was man of the match after he took his career-best bowling figures of 8 for 62 in the second innings and his 25th five-wicket haul in first-class cricket.

== Teams ==
The following teams competed in the 2017–18 tournament:

Regional associations

- Faisalabad
- Federally Administered Tribal Areas
- Islamabad
- Karachi Whites
- Lahore Blues
- Lahore Whites
- Peshawar
- Rawalpindi

Departments

- Habib Bank Limited
- Khan Research Laboratories
- National Bank of Pakistan
- Pakistan Television
- Sui Northern Gas Pipelines Limited
- Sui Southern Gas Company
- United Bank Limited
- Water and Power Development Authority

== Group stage ==
=== Tables ===
Pool A
Team	Pld	W	L	D	NR	Pts
Sui Northern Gas Pipelines Limited (Q)	7	6	0	1	0	51
Sui Southern Gas Company (Q)	7	4	1	2	0	43
Lahore Blues (Q)	7	4	3	0	0	34
Water and Power Development Authority (Q)	7	4	2	1	0	33
Peshawar	7	3	3	0	1	29
Islamabad	7	1	4	2	0	12
National Bank of Pakistan	7	1	4	2	0	12
Faisalabad	7	0	6	0	1	1

Pool B
Team	Pld	W	L	D	NR	Pts
United Bank Limited (Q)	7	6	1	0	0	57
Habib Bank Limited (Q)	7	5	2	0	0	46
Khan Research Laboratories (Q)	7	4	2	1	0	33
Lahore Whites (Q)	7	3	2	2	0	33
Rawalpindi	7	3	4	0	0	24
Karachi Whites	7	2	4	1	0	18
Pakistan Television	7	1	5	1	0	12
Federally Administered Tribal Areas	7	1	5	1	0	9

(Q) The top four teams in each group advanced to the Super Eight stage

Position determined by total points, most matches won, fewest matches lost, followed by adjusted net run rate (matches with no result, i.e. those where both teams did not complete their first innings, were disregarded); matches finishing in a draw were decided on first innings scores, with points awarded as follows:
- Win by an innings = 10 points
- Win having led on first innings = 9 points
- Win having tied or trailed on first innings = 6 points
- Tie having led on first innings = 5 points
- Draw having led on first innings = 3 points
- Draw having tied on first innings, or tie having trailed on first innings = 2 points
- Draw with no result on first innings, or abandoned without a ball bowled = 1 point
- Loss, or draw having trailed on first innings = 0 points

=== Results ===
==== Pool A ====
===== Round 1 =====
26–29 September 2017
Scorecard

Faisalabad	v	National Bank of Pakistan
361 (117.2 overs); Asif Ali 101 (160); Raza Hasan 4/112 (38.2 overs)		407/9d (153 overs); Hamza Paracha 91 (244); Saeed Ajmal 5/108 (43 overs)
124 (61.4 overs); Ali Shan 41 (118); Raza Hasan 8/76 (30.4 overs)		79/4 (15.3 overs); Ali Asad 32* (30); Raees Ahmed 1/5 (1.3 overs)

National Bank of Pakistan won by 6 wickets
Iqbal Stadium, Faisalabad
Umpires: Mohammad Asif and Adnan Rasheed

- National Bank of Pakistan won the toss and elected to field.
- Abdul Samad, Iftikhar Ahmed, Ali Shan, Raees Ahmed (Faisalabad) and Saif Ali (National Bank of Pakistan) all made their first-class debuts.

26–29 September 2017
Scorecard

Sui Southern Gas Company	v	Islamabad
310 (89.3 overs); Asif Zakir 89 (174); Ali Imran 3/62 (19.3 overs)		189 (67.2 overs); Fahad Iqbal 30 (65); Zia-ul-Haq 4/46 (12.2 overs)
336/4d (77 overs); Adil Amin 83 (173); Babar Rehman 1/39 (12 overs)		97 (34.2 overs); Abid Ali 19 (46); Zia-ul-Haq 4/31 (12 overs)

Sui Southern Gas Corporation won by 360 runs
Diamond Club Ground, Islamabad
Umpires: Iqbal Sheikh and Riazuddin

- Islamabad won the toss won the toss and elected to field.

26–29 September 2017
Scorecard

Water and Power Development Authority	v	Lahore Blues
297 (88.4 overs); Aamer Sajjad 106* (199); Bilawal Iqbal 3/51 (15.4 overs)		198 (69.4 overs); Raza Ali Dar 72 (136); Hasnain Shah 4/59 (17 overs)
261/7d (79 overs); Mohammad Saad 104* (214); Agha Salman 3/35 (13 overs)		240 (105.2 overs); Farhan Khan 51 (144); Khalid Usman 4/31 (24.2 overs)

Water and Power Development Authority won by 120 runs
Gaddafi Stadium, Lahore
Umpires: Khalid Mahmood and Sultan Mahmood

- Water and Power Development Authority won the toss and elected to bat.
- Hasnain Shah (Water and Power Development Authority) made his first-class debut.

26–29 September 2017
Scorecard

Sui Northern Gas Pipelines Limited	v	Peshawar
207 (60 overs); Mohammad Rizwan 67 (129); Imran Khan 3/44 (18 overs)		203 (59.1 overs); Gauhar Ali 66 (72); Samiullah Khan 4/50 (15 overs)
277 (79.3 overs); Imran Butt 60 (124); Taj Wali 5/81 (23.3 overs)		127 (38.4 overs); Akbar Badshah 36 (79); Shadab Khan 4/12 (8.4 overs)

Sui Northern Gas Pipelines Limited won by 154 runs
Abbottabad Cricket Stadium, Abbottabad
Umpires: Rashid Riaz and Saqib Khan

- Sui Northern Gas Pipelines Limited won the toss and elected to bat.
- Imran Rafiq (Sui Northern Gas Pipelines Limited) made his first-class debut.

===== Round 2 =====
3–6 October 2017
Scorecard

Water and Power Development Authority	v	Faisalabad
142 (58.3 overs); Mohammad Saad 32 (51); Atif Jabbar 3/23 (16 overs)		170 (71 overs); Ali Shan 55 (155); Zulfiqar Babar 7/41 (26 overs)
339 (101.2 overs); Kamran Akmal 139 (229); Ahmed Safi Abdullah 4/87 (24 overs)		122 (47.2 overs); Ali Shan 37 (94); Mohammad Irfan 4/29 (10 overs)

Water and Power Development Authority won by 189 runs
Iqbal Stadium, Faisalabad
Umpires: Mohammad Asif and Riazuddin

- Faisalabad won the toss and elected to field.

3–6 October 2017
Scorecard

Islamabad	v	Sui Northern Gas Pipelines Limited
315 (89 overs); Faizan Riaz 79 (107); Mohammad Hafeez 4/62 (23.4 overs)		273 (87.5 overs); Iftikhar Ahmed 103 (209); Ali Imran 4/85 (26.5 overs)
296/9d (102.5 overs); Faizan Riaz 114* (197); Iftikhar Ahmed 2/19 (9.5 overs)		180/6 (58 overs); Mohammad Rizwan 109* (156); Hamza Nadeem 2/32 (14 overs)

Match drawn
Diamond Club Ground, Islamabad
Umpires: Majid Hussain and Qaiser Waheed

- Islamabad won the toss and elected to bat.

3–6 October 2017
Scorecard

Lahore Blues	v	National Bank of Pakistan
359 (106.2 overs); Raza Ali Dar 87 (182); Raza Hasan 4/109 (38.2 overs)		154 (47 overs); Rameez Raja 36 (76); Saad Nasim 6/30 (13 overs)
		201 (64.5 overs) (f/o); Raza Hasan 52 (94); Bilawal Iqbal 6/38 (15 overs)

Lahore Blues won by an innings and 4 runs
Gaddafi Stadium, Lahore
Umpires: Khalid Mahmood and Aziz-ur-Rehman

- Lahore Blues won the toss and elected to bat.
- Mushtaq Ahmed (National Bank of Pakistan) made his first-class debut.

3–6 October 2017
Scorecard

Sui Southern Gas Company	v	Peshawar
348 (83.4 overs); Aamer Yamin 99 (102); Taj Wali 3/92 (24.4 overs)		192 (69.2 overs); Ashfaq Ahmed 61 (140); Aamer Yamin 3/33 (14 overs)
284/8d (72 overs); Umar Amin 132 (208); Israrullah 2/32 (7 overs)		103 (24.1 overs); Obaidullah 53 (53); Aamer Yamin 4/27 (6 overs)

Sui Southern Gas Corporation won by 337 runs
Arbab Niaz Stadium, Peshawar
Umpires: Adnan Rashid and Rashid Riaz

- Sui Southern Gas Corporation won the toss and elected to bat.

===== Round 3 =====
9–12 October 2017
Scorecard

Sui Northern Gas Pipelines Limited	v	Faisalabad
241 (92.3 overs); Ali Waqas 58 (181); Ahmed Safi Abdullah 4/66 (35 overs)		173 (76.5 overs); Asif Ali 48 (114); Imran Khalid 4/56 (25.5 overs)
272/8d (74.3 overs); Taimoor Sultan 102 (196); Ahmed Safi Abdullah 4/68 (23.3 overs)		167 (64.5 overs); Asif Ali 61 (82); Iftikhar Ahmed 6/39 (13.5 overs)

Sui Northern Gas Pipelines Limited won by 173 runs
Iqbal Stadium, Faisalabad
Umpires: Saqib Khan and Tariq Rasheed

- Faisalabad won the toss and elected to field.
- Ibtisam Sheikh and Asad Raza (Faisalabad) both made their first-class debuts.

9–12 October 2017
Scorecard

Islamabad	v	Water and Power Development Authority
81 (32.1 overs); Fahad Iqbal 27 (58); Mohammad Asif 5/28 (11.1 overs)		116 (27 overs); Aamer Sajjad 43 (34); Shehzad Azam 5/40 (9 overs)
177 (56 overs); Faizan Riaz 35 (48); Mohammad Asif 6/53 (17 overs)		143/4 (39 overs); Salman Butt 62 (102); Hamza Nadeem 3/39 (15 overs)

Water and Power Development Authority won by 6 wickets
Diamond Club Ground, Islamabad
Umpires: Mohammad Asif and Rashid Riaz

- Islamabad won the toss and elected to bat.

9–12 October 2017
Scorecard

Lahore Blues	v	Sui Southern Gas Company
291 (88 overs); Saad Nasim 123 (156); Aamer Yamin 6/44 (13 overs)		405 (97.1 overs); Fawad Alam 105 (157); Bilawal Iqbal 4/78 (26 overs)
230 (89.3 overs); Waqas Saleem 52 (140); Zia-ul-Haq 4/55 (15.3 overs)		117/2 (25.1 overs); Zain Abbas 45 (43); Shahid Nawaz 1/13 (5 overs)

Sui Southern Gas Corporation won by 8 wickets
Gaddafi Stadium, Lahore
Umpires: Khalid Mahmood and Shameem Ansari

- Sui Southern Gas Corporation won the toss and elected to field.
- Ali Zaryab and Inam Javed (Lahore Blues) both made their first-class debuts.

9–12 October 2017
Scorecard

Peshawar	v	National Bank of Pakistan
264 (63.2 overs); Jamaluddin 47 (93); Altaf Ahmed 6/57 (16 overs)		254 (66.2 overs); Rameez Raja 150 (167); Imran Khan 4/76 (17 overs)
334 (66.3 overs); Obaidullah 66 (130); Raza Hasan 6/101 (21 overs)		248 (78.3 overs); Kamran Ghulam 72 (98); Israrullah 4/27 (15 overs)

Peshawar won by 96 runs
Arbab Niaz Stadium, Peshawar
Umpires: Ahmed Shahab and Farooq Ali Khan

- National Bank of Pakistan won the toss and elected to field.
- Mohammad Ismail (National Bank of Pakistan) made his first-class debut.

===== Round 4 =====
15–18 October 2017
Scorecard

Faisalabad	v	Sui Southern Gas Company
153 (57 overs); Ibtisam Sheikh 45 (78); Kashif Bhatti 6/52 (25 overs)		323 (92 overs); Umar Amin 145 (270); Ahmed Safi Abdullah 4/71 (27 overs)
167 (75.2 overs); Atiq-ur-Rehman 51 (141); Kashif Bhatti 8/50 (31.2 overs)

Sui Southern Gas Corporation won by an innings and 3 runs
Iqbal Stadium, Faisalabad
Umpires: Aaley Haider and Ghaffar Kazmi

- Sui Southern Gas Corporation won the toss and elected to field.
- Atiq-ur-Rehman and Ameer Hamza (Faisalabad) both made their first-class debuts.

15–18 October 2017
Scorecard

National Bank of Pakistan	v	Islamabad
553/8d (146.1 overs); Kamran Ghulam 102 (153); Faizan Riaz 2/90 (17 overs)		416 (168.3 overs); Abid Ali 231* (484); Altaf Ahmed 6/80 (30.3 overs)
85/2 (26 overs); Ali Asad 37* (78); Hamza Nadeem 1/15 (6 overs)

Match drawn
Diamond Club Ground, Islamabad
Umpires: Mohammad Sajid and Waleed Yaqub

- National Bank of Pakistan won the toss and elected to bat.

15–18 October 2017
Scorecard

Lahore Blues	v	Sui Northern Gas Pipelines Limited
108 (38.5 overs); Waqas Saleem 35 (69); Bilawal Bhatti 5/35 (13 overs)		199 (69 overs); Mohammad Rizwan 84 (145); Asadullah 3/29 (12 overs)
215 (65 overs); Bilawal Iqbal 67 (108); Yasir Shah 4/86 (27 overs)		128/5 (36 overs); Iftikhar Ahmed 52 (77); Aizaz Cheema 2/21 (7 overs)

Sui Northern Gas Pipelines Limited won by 5 wickets
Lahore City Cricket Association Ground, Lahore
Umpires: Farooq Ali Khan and Imtiaz Iqbal

- Lahore Blues won the toss and elected to bat.
- Mubeen Hameed and Asadullah (Lahore Blues) both made their first-class debuts.

15–18 October 2017
Scorecard

Peshawar	v	Water and Power Development Authority
235 (56 overs); Gauhar Ali 76 (69); Mohammad Ali 4/69 (20 overs)		154 (57.2 overs); Kamran Akmal 55 (90); Taj Wali 6/53 (19.2 overs)
164 (56.5 overs); Obaidullah 68 (132); Mohammad Asif 5/40 (13.5 overs)		242 (75.5 overs); Mohammad Saad 111* (247); Imran Khan 3/48 (18 overs)

Peshawar won by 3 runs
Arbab Niaz Stadium, Peshawar
Umpires: Ahmed Shahab and Faisal Afridi

- Water and Power Development Authority won the toss and elected to field.
- Mohammad Irfan was Mankaded by Taj Wali off the final delivery of the match.

===== Round 5 =====
21–24 October 2017
Scorecard

Islamabad	v	Faisalabad
386 (113.1 overs); Fahad Iqbal 104 (154); Naseer Akram 5/122 (39 overs)		204 (58.2 overs); Atiq-ur-Rehman 39 (72); Ali Imran 3/56 (15.2 overs)
26/0 (12.1 overs); Afaq Raheem 14* (37)		207 (66.2 overs) (f/o); Ali Shan 46 (84); Shehzad Azam 6/80 (23.2 overs)

Islamabad won by 10 wickets
Diamond Club Ground, Islamabad
Umpires: Farooq Ali Khan and Zameer Haider

- Faisalabad won the toss and elected to field.

21–24 October 2017
Scorecard

Peshawar	v	Lahore Blues
181 (48.1 overs); Gauhar Ali 68 (59); Saad Nasim 4/32 (8 overs)		148 (44.2 overs); Tayyab Tahir 60 (91); Imran Khan 5/71 (19 overs)
65 (24.5 overs); Gauhar Ali 22 (42); Aizaz Cheema 6/23 (8 overs)		99/2 (18.2 overs); Waqas Saleem 47* (57); Shahzaib Ahmed 1/22 (6.2 overs)

Lahore Blues won by 8 wickets
Abbottabad Cricket Stadium, Abbottabad
Umpires: Imtiaz Iqbal and Saqib Khan

- Peshawar won the toss and elected to bat.

21–24 October 2017
Scorecard

National Bank of Pakistan	v	Water and Power Development Authority
314 (92.3 overs); Bilal Asif 84 (108); Zahid Mansoor 2/23 (9 overs)		321 (91.5 overs); Mohammad Saad 134* (254); Raza Hasan 5/89 (34.5 overs)
195 (58.5 overs); Kamran Ghulam 64 (116); Zulfiqar Babar 5/46 (15.5 overs)		192/4 (45.4 overs); Ayaz Tasawwar 59* (63); Kamran Ghulam 4/58 (13 overs)

Water and Power Development Authority won by 6 wickets
Rawalpindi Cricket Stadium, Rawalpindi
Umpires: Faisal Afridi and Riazuddin

- National Bank of Pakistan won the toss and elected to bat.

21–24 October 2017
Scorecard

Sui Southern Gas Company	v	Sui Northern Gas Pipelines Limited
129 (41.3 overs); Awais Zia 45 (74); Asad Ali 4/38 (10.3 overs)		144 (46 overs); Ali Waqas 45 (85); Ahmed Jamal 9/50 (20 overs)
74 (25.3 overs); Sami Aslam 19 (61); Mohammad Abbas 3/10 (8.3 overs)		63/2 (27.1 overs); Imran Butt 25 (75); Kashif Bhatti 1/10 (5.1 overs)

Sui Northern Gas Pipelines Limited won by 8 wickets
Iqbal Stadium, Faisalabad
Umpires: Aaley Haider and Qaiser Waheed

- Sui Northern Gas Pipelines Limited won the toss and elected to field.
- Ahmed Jamal (Sui Southern Gas Corporation) took career-best figures of 9/50.

===== Round 6 =====
27–30 October 2017
Scorecard

Islamabad	v	Peshawar
165 (38 overs); Faizan Riaz 64 (66); Taj Wali 7/50 (15 overs)		454 (86.5 overs); Israrullah 212 (235); Hamza Nadeem 3/100 (25.5 overs)
279 (75.3 overs); Faizan Riaz 86 (111); Nasir Ahmed 3/40 (11 overs)

Peshawar won by an innings and 10 runs
Diamond Club Ground, Islamabad
Umpires: Qaiser Waheed and Tahir Shah

- Islamabad won the toss and elected to bat.
- Sajid Rehman (Islamabad) made his first-class debut.

27–30 October 2017
Scorecard

Faisalabad	v	Lahore Blues
184 (52.5 overs); Iftikhar Ahmed 52 (67); Aizaz Cheema 6/56 (18.5 overs)		372 (96.4 overs); Saad Nasim 121 (149); Naseer Akram 4/98 (23.4 overs)
188 (62.2 overs); Hasan Mahmood 48 (153); Saif-ur-Rehman 4/54 (21 overs)		4/0 (0.1 overs); Waqas Saleem 4* (1)

Lahore Blues won by 10 wickets
Abbottabad Cricket Stadium, Abbottabad
Umpires: Aaley Haider and Saqib Khan

- Faisalabad won the toss and elected to bat.

27–30 October 2017
Scorecard

Sui Northern Gas Pipelines Limited	v	National Bank of Pakistan
210 (72.3 overs); Imran Butt 76 (195); Bilal Asif 4/33 (12.2 overs)		66 (34.4 overs); Rameez Raja 11 (23); Azizullah 6/27 (15.4 overs)
235 (59.2 overs); Asad Shafiq 79* (121); Bilal Asif 6/70 (21.2 overs)		173 (48 overs); Rameez Raja 29 (45); Bilawal Bhatti 3/37 (13 overs)

Sui Northern Gas Pipelines Limited won by 206 runs
Jinnah Stadium, Sialkot

- National Bank of Pakistan won the toss and elected to field.

27–30 October 2017
Scorecard

Sui Southern Gas Company	v	Water and Power Development Authority
270 (85.1 overs); Fawad Alam 63 (117); Mohammad Asif 4/82 (28 overs)		214 (69.2 overs); Mohammad Saad 51 (138); Azhar Attari 5/67 (20.2 overs)
330/8 (107.3 overs); Awais Zia 92 (91); Zulfiqar Babar 3/76 (30 overs)

Match drawn
Iqbal Stadium, Faisalabad
Umpires: Mohammad Asif and Waheed Yaqoob

- Water and Power Development Authority won the toss and elected to field.

===== Round 7 =====
2–5 November 2017
Scorecard

Faisalabad	v	Peshawar

Match abandoned
Iqbal Stadium, Faisalabad
Umpires: Mohammad Asif and Tahir Shah

- No toss.
- No play was possible due to fog.

2–5 November 2017
Scorecard

Lahore Blues	v	Islamabad
220 (51 overs); Tayyab Tahir 85 (130); Shehzad Azam 6/64 (14 overs)		138 (60.1 overs); Abid Ali 59 (135); Aizaz Cheema 4/33 (21 overs)
88 (30 overs); Tayyab Tahir 19 (32); Shehzad Azam 5/49 (15 overs)		109 (34.1 overs); Mohammad Naqash 24 (26); Aizaz Cheema 6/37 (14.1 overs)

Lahore Blues won by 61 runs
Gaddafi Stadium, Lahore
Umpires: Aaley Haider and Tahir Rasheed

- Islamabad won the toss and elected to field.
- Naseerullah and Muzammil Shah (Islamabad) both made their first-class debuts.

2–5 November 2017
Scorecard

National Bank of Pakistan	v	Sui Southern Gas Company
259 (87.5 overs); Hamza Paracha 90 (179); Azhar Attari 4/57 (29 overs)		285 (96 overs); Muzammil Nizam 90* (165); Bilal Asif 4/84 (36 overs)
234/5 (80 overs); Ali Asad 90 (163); Ahmed Jamal 3/53 (16 overs)

Match drawn
Jinnah Stadium, Sialkot
Umpires: Ahmed Shahab and Faisal Afridi

- National Bank of Pakistan won the toss and elected to bat.
- Maqsood Aziz (National Bank of Pakistan) made his first-class debut.

2–5 November 2017
Scorecard

Water and Power Development Authority	v	Sui Northern Gas Pipelines Limited
305 (83 overs); Aamer Sajjad 88 (131); Asad Ali 3/57 (21 overs)		296 (97.5 overs); Asad Shafiq 53 (120); Khalid Usman 6/93 (31.5 overs)
117 (44.2 overs); Mohammad Saad 46 (79); Mohammad Abbas 6/24 (13.2 overs)		129/4 (28 overs); Iftikhar Ahmed 51 (46); Hasnain Shah 2/60 (10 overs)

Sui Northern Gas Pipelines Limited won by 6 wickets
Abbottabad Cricket Stadium, Abbottabad
Umpires: Farooq Ali Khan and Waleed Yaqub

- Sui Northern Gas Pipelines Limited won the toss and elected to field.

==== Pool B ====
===== Round 1 =====
26–29 September 2017
Scorecard

Habib Bank Limited	v	Federally Administered Tribal Areas
238 (70.4 overs); Ahmed Shehzad 73 (133); Sohail Akhtar 5/45 (14 overs)		178 (55.1 overs); Mohammad Naeem 96 (175); Faheem Ashraf 3/38 (10 overs)
448/6d (103.1 overs); Fakhar Zaman 111 (104); Asif Ali 3/107 (24 overs)		173 (53 overs); Yasir Hameed 66 (75); Abdur Rehman 7/50 (18 overs)

Habib Bank Limited won by 335 runs
Jinnah Stadium, Sialkot
Umpires: Shozab Raza and Tariq Rasheed

- Federally Administered Tribal Areas won the toss won the toss and elected to field.
- Saddam Afridi (Federally Administered Tribal Areas) and Salman Afridi (Habib Bank Limited) both made their first-class debuts.

26–29 September 2017
Scorecard

Karachi Whites	v	United Bank Limited
208 (51.3 overs); Mohammad Hasan 67 (93); Sohail Khan 6/59 (15 overs)		434 (138.5 overs); Hammad Azam 128 (243); Mohammad Sami 5/84 (32 overs)
153 (54.5 overs); Khurram Manzoor 54 (125); Sohail Khan 5/54 (14.5 overs)

United Bank Limited won by an innings and 73 runs
United Bank Limited Sports Complex, Karachi
Umpires: Aslam Bareach and Zameer Haider

- United Bank Limited won the toss and elected to field.

26–29 September 2017
Scorecard

Lahore Whites	v	Pakistan Television
244 (73.2 overs); Mohammad Waqas 46 (101); Raheel Majeed 3/23 (5.2 overs)		161 (54.2 overs); Saud Shakeel 62 (129); Waqas Ahmed 5/54 (16 overs)
382/7d (98.5 overs); Rizwan Hussain 138 (169); Saud Shakeel 1/21 (8 overs)		192 (65.5 overs); Hasan Raza 60 (163); Mohammad Irfan 4/38 (24.5 overs)

Lahore Whites won by 273 runs
Lahore City Cricket Association Ground, Lahore
Umpires: Sajid Afridi and Shameem Ansari

- Pakistan Television won the toss and elected to field.
- Salman Fayyaz (Lahore Whites), Nihal Mansoor and Waleed Malik (Pakistan Television) all made their first-class debuts.

26–29 September 2017
Scorecard

Rawalpindi	v	Khan Research Laboratories
174 (70.3 overs); Umair Masood 53 (169); Yasir Ali 6/50 (17.3 overs)		131 (45.2 overs); Hasan Raza 38 (69); Nazar Hussain 4/42 (11 overs)
139 (46 overs); Sarmad Hameed 58 (77); Shaheen Afridi 8/39 (15 overs)		77 (23 overs); Abdul Rehman Muzammil 23 (39); Nazar Hussain 5/31 (12 overs)

Rawalpindi won by 105 runs
Rawalpindi Cricket Stadium, Rawalpindi
Umpires: Ghaffar Kazmi and Waleed Yaqub

- Khan Research Laboratories won the toss and elected to field.
- Umair Masood (Rawalpindi), Saif Badar and Shaheen Afridi (Khan Research Laboratories) all made their first-class debuts.
- Shaheen Afridi (Khan Research Laboratories) took the best figures by a Pakistani bowler on first-class debut with 8/39.

===== Round 2 =====
3–6 October 2017
Scorecard

Federally Administered Tribal Areas	v	Khan Research Laboratories
237 (70.4 overs); Asif Afridi 64 (132); Yasir Ali 4/48 (14 overs)		238 (85.1 overs); Jaahid Ali 80 (151); Hafeez-ur-Rehman 3/54 (19 overs)
166 (74.4 overs); Mukhtar Ahmed 40 (29); Yasir Ali 5/41 (18 overs)		166/4 (66.3 overs); Hasan Raza 46 (127); Asif Ali 2/42 (12 overs)

Khan Research Laboratories won by 6 wickets
Jinnah Stadium, Sialkot
Umpires: Asif Yaqoob and Waleed Yaqub

- Khan Research Laboratories won the toss and elected to field.
- Samiullah and Hafeez-ur-Rehman (Federally Administered Tribal Areas) both made their first-class debuts.

3–6 October 2017
Scorecard

Karachi Whites	v	Pakistan Television
181 (51.1 overs); Mohammad Hasan 88 (142); Zohaib Shera 5/59 (16 overs)		195 (76.5 overs); Mohammad Irfan 45 (121); Adeel Malik 3/49 (22 overs)
186 (61 overs); Faraz Ali 35 (86); Zohaib Shera 4/62 (23 overs)		173/5 (55.5 overs); Saud Shakeel 68 (122); Mohammad Sami 2/69 (16 overs)

Pakistan Television won by 5 wickets
National Bank of Pakistan Sports Complex, Karachi
Umpires: Aslam Bareach and Zameer Haider

- Pakistan Television won the toss and elected to field.
- Hassan Khan (Karachi Whites), Hasan Mohsin and Athar Mahmood (Pakistan Television) all made their first-class debuts.

3–6 October 2017
Scorecard

Lahore Whites	v	United Bank Limited
289 (109.5 overs); Rizwan Hussain 67 (97); Sohail Khan 4/50 (26 overs)		499 (127.5 overs); Saad Ali 175 (292); Adnan Rasool 5/134 (31.5 overs)
88 (25.3 overs); Umaid Asif 43 (51); Rumman Raees 9/25 (12.3 overs)

United Bank Limited won by an innings and 122 runs
Lahore City Cricket Association Ground, Lahore
Umpires: Shameem Ansari and Sultan Mahmood

- Lahore Whites won the toss and elected to bat.
- Rumman Raees (United Bank Limited) took the second-best figures in first-class cricket in Pakistan.

3–6 October 2017
Scorecard

Rawalpindi	v	Habib Bank Limited
102 (34.2 overs); Haseeb Azam 24 (36); Junaid Khan 5/32 (12.2 overs)		297/8d (74 overs); Imran Farhat 94 (164); Nazar Hussain 5/48 (21 overs)
130 (30.3 overs); Umar Waheed 51 (68); Usman Khan 5/46 (7.3 overs)

Habib Bank Limited won by an innings and 65 runs
Rawalpindi Cricket Stadium, Rawalpindi
Umpires: Mohammad Sajid and Tariq Rasheed

- Habib Bank Limited won the toss and elected to field.

===== Round 3 =====
9–12 October 2017
Scorecard

United Bank Limited	v	Federally Administered Tribal Areas
361 (110.3 overs); Gulraiz Sadaf 69 (129); Hafeez-ur-Rehman (cricketer) 5/76 (21 overs)		143 (43 overs); Asif Ali 41 (73); Sameen Gul 5/47 (13 overs)
		88 (25.1 overs) (f/o); Asif Afridi 20 (22); Sohail Khan 5/12 (9.1 overs)

United Bank Limited won by an innings and 130 runs
Jinnah Stadium, Sialkot
Umpires: Asif Yaqoob and Sultan Mahmood

- Federally Administered Tribal Areas won the toss and elected to field.
- Wilayat Mohammad (Federally Administered Tribal Areas) made his first-class debut.

9–12 October 2017
Scorecard

Khan Research Laboratories	v	Karachi Whites
244 (80.2 overs); Saeed Anwar 74 (124); Hassan Khan 3/41 (17 overs)		101 (44.3 overs); Faraz Ali 45 (105); Ali Shafiq 5/31 (15.3 overs)
97 (32 overs); Usman Arshad 23 (53); Abdullah Mukaddam 5/34 (13 overs)		110 (47.5 overs); Faisal Iqbal 66 (117); Sadaf Hussain 3/36 (16 overs)

Khan Research Laboratories won by 130 runs
United Bank Limited Sports Complex, Karachi
Umpires: Aslam Bareach and Zameer Haider

- Karachi Whites won the toss and elected to field.
- Usman Khan (Karachi Whites) and Ali Shafiq (Khan Research Laboratories) both made their first-class debuts.

9–12 October 2017
Scorecard

Habib Bank Limited	v	Lahore Whites
194 (67.3 overs); Azeem Ghumman 37 (60); Mohammad Irfan 4/49 (26 overs)		71 (34.5 overs); Irfan Zaman 14 (79); Israr-ul-Haq 2/3 (1.5 overs)
98 (28.1 overs); Fazal Subhan 45 (53); Umaid Asif 6/28 (11 overs)		192 (53.4 overs); Rizwan Hussain 63 (101); Abdur Rehman 4/49 (15.4 overs)

Habib Bank Limited won by 29 runs
Lahore City Cricket Association Ground, Lahore
Umpires: Mohammad Sajid and Waseemuddin

- Habib Bank Limited won the toss and elected to bat.
- Israr-ul-Haq (Habib Bank Limited) made his first-class debut.

9–12 October 2017
Scorecard

Rawalpindi	v	Pakistan Television
251 (68.2 overs); Ataullah 53* (86); Tabish Khan 4/59 (24 overs)		257 (91.1 overs); Taimoor Sultan 73* (122); Ataullah 7/92 (29.1 overs)
272 (83.1 overs); Babar Hussain 66 (106); Rizwan Akbar 5/56 (21.1 overs)		110 (38.3 overs); Mohammad Irfan 39* (49); Ataullah 5/29 (12 overs)

Rawalpindi won by 156 runs
Rawalpindi Cricket Stadium, Rawalpindi
Umpires: Riazuddin and Waleed Yaqub

- Pakistan Television won the toss and elected to field.

===== Round 4 =====
15–18 October 2017
Scorecard

Federally Administered Tribal Areas	v	Pakistan Television
281 (86 overs); Asif Ali 102 (197); Tabish Khan 3/67 (22 overs)		400 (130.3 overs); Saud Shakeel 108 (211); Asif Afridi 4/116 (41 overs)
449/8d (107 overs); Yasir Hameed 157 (263); Mohammad Irfan 5/136 (27 overs)		92/4 (23 overs); Taimur Khan 44 (32); Asif Afridi 3/18 (10 overs)

Match drawn
Jinnah Stadium, Sialkot
Umpires: Mohammad Asif and Tahir Shah

- Pakistan Television won the toss and elected to field.
- Ahsan Hafeez (Federally Administered Tribal Areas) made his first-class debut.

15–18 October 2017
Scorecard

Habib Bank Limited	v	Karachi Whites
137 (40 overs); Amad Butt 63 (78); Mohammad Sami 4/40 (15 overs)		263 (80 overs); Ahmed Iqbal 99 (211); Abdur Rehman 4/49 (18 overs)
191 (85.5 overs); Amad Butt 55 (81); Mohammad Sami 5/55 (21 overs)		66/1 (13.3 overs); Khurram Manzoor 48* (42); Amad Butt 1/11 (3 overs)

Karachi Whites won by 9 wickets
National Bank of Pakistan Sports Complex, Karachi
Umpires: Abdul Muqeet and Zameer Haider

- Karachi Whites won the toss and elected to field.
- Bilal Shah (Habib Bank Limited) made his first-class debut.

15–18 October 2017
Scorecard

Khan Research Laboratories	v	Lahore Whites
322 (110.3 overs); Usman Arshad 77 (194); Umar Farooq 4/50 (16 overs)		330 (112 overs); Rizwan Hussain 50 (74); Sadaf Hussain 7/85 (36 overs)
283 (97.3 overs); Saeed Anwar 79 (132); Mohammad Irfan 6/99 (37.3 overs)

Match drawn
Gaddafi Stadium, Lahore
Umpires: Asif Yaqoob and Khalid Mahmood

- Lahore Whites won the toss and elected to field.

15–18 October 2017
Scorecard

Rawalpindi	v	United Bank Limited
136 (41.1 overs); Rameez Alam 57 (90); Mir Hamza 5/26 (13.1 overs)		229 (63.2 overs); Saad Ali 93 (99); Nazar Hussain 3/78 (24 overs)
192 (55.4 overs); Umar Waheed 46 (72); Mir Hamza 5/56 (16.4 overs)		100/3 (15.4 overs); Saad Ali 37* (31); Sohail Tanvir 2/26 (5 overs)

United Bank Limited won by 7 wickets
Rawalpindi Cricket Stadium, Rawalpindi
Umpires: Nasir Hussain and Riazuddin

- United Bank Limited won the toss and elected to field.

===== Round 5 =====
21–24 October 2017
Scorecard

Habib Bank Limited	v	Khan Research Laboratories
212 (74.3 overs); Azeem Ghumman 62 (147); Ahmed Bashir 4/53 (25 overs)		106 (25.1 overs); Nayyer Abbas 37 (39); Amad Butt 5/26 (10 overs)
98 (52.1 overs); Jamal Anwar 38* (96); Ali Shafiq 4/8 (13.1 overs)		111 (47 overs); Sajid Khan 38 (84); Amad Butt 5/23 (11 overs)

Habib Bank Limited won by 93 runs
Multan Cricket Stadium, Multan
Umpires: Ghaffar Kazmi and Mohammad Sajid

- Khan Research Laboratories won the toss and elected to field.

21–24 October 2017
Scorecard

Rawalpindi	v	Karachi Whites
123 (55.3 overs); Behram Khan 43 (114); Mohammad Sami 5/32 (20.3 overs)		175 (50.4 overs); Faisal Iqbal 45 (51); Haseeb Azam 5/52 (16 overs)
153 (66 overs); Sohail Tanvir 30 (61); Mohammad Sami 4/48 (21 overs)		103/3 (22.5 overs); Faisal Iqbal 42* (23); Nadeem Sikander 2/23 (5.5 overs)

Karachi Whites won by 7 wickets
National Stadium, Karachi
Umpires: Abdul Muqeet and Aslam Bareach

- Karachi Whites won the toss and elected to field.

21–24 October 2017
Scorecard

Lahore Whites	v	Federally Administered Tribal Areas
240 (79.1 overs); Mohammad Mohsin 53 (111); Asif Afridi 5/68 (29 overs)		135 (50.4 overs); Asif Ali 36 (98); Mohammad Irfan 4/31 (19.4 overs)
289/5d (85 overs); Usman Salahuddin 101* (148); Sajjad Hussain 3/61 (17 overs)		292 (67.1 overs); Yasir Hameed 89 (109); Mohammad Irfan 6/109 (23.1 overs)

Lahore Whites won by 102 runs
Lahore City Cricket Association Ground, Lahore
Umpires: Khalid Mahmood and Majid Hussain

- Federally Administered Tribal Areas won the toss and elected to field.

21–24 October 2017
Scorecard

Pakistan Television	v	United Bank Limited
312 (106 overs); Adnan Mehmood 124 (310); Mir Hamza 7/68 (28 overs)		504 (96.4 overs); Saad Ali 232 (255); Tabish Khan 5/130 (27.4 overs)
285 (78.2 overs); Ali Khan 109 (130); Mir Hamza 5/69 (17.2 overs)		97/1 (15.4 overs); Akbar-ur-Rehman 46* (39); Rizwan Akbar 1/27 (50 overs)

United Bank Limited won by 9 wickets
Jinnah Stadium, Sialkot
Umpires: Tahir Rasheed and Tahir Shah

- United Bank Limited won the toss and elected to field.
- In the second innings, United Bank Limited dismissed eight players from Pakistan Television by LBW, the most in first-class cricket in Pakistan.

===== Round 6 =====
27–30 October 2017
Scorecard

Habib Bank Limited	v	Pakistan Television
174 (54.3 overs); Hasan Raza 86* (120); Umar Gul 5/43 (14.3 overs)		314 (109.4 overs); Imran Farhat 105 (169); Tabish Khan 7/67 (34.4 overs)
184 (48.3 overs); Saud Shakeel 78 (131); Umar Gul 5/46 (15.3 overs)		45/3 (15.2 overs); Salman Afridi 19* (45); Ali Khan 2/20 (6.2 overs)

Habib Bank Limited won by 7 wickets
Multan Cricket Stadium, Multan
Umpires: Nasir Hussain and Zameer Haider

- Pakistan Television won the toss and elected to bat.

27–30 October 2017
Scorecard

Federally Administered Tribal Areas	v	Karachi Whites
275 (75.2 overs); Mohammad Naeem 70 (128); Adeel Malik 4/60 (21 overs)		261 (77.4 overs); Faisal Iqbal 100* (163); Asif Afridi 5/64 (21 overs)
234 (74.4 overs); Asif Ali 65 (109); Faraz Ali 4/27 (10.4 overs)		141 (36.5 overs); Khurram Manzoor 51* (78); Sajjad Hussain 6/75 (18 overs)

Federally Administered Tribal Areas won by 107 runs
National Stadium, Karachi
Umpires: Abdul Muqeet and Aslam Bareach

- Karachi Whites won the toss and elected to field.

27–30 October 2017
Scorecard

Khan Research Laboratories	v	United Bank Limited
197 (65 overs); Abdul Rehman Muzammil 74* (134); Ehsan Adil 3/32 (14 overs)		185 (61.1 overs); Ammad Alam 56 (90); Sadaf Hussain 4/66 (23 overs)
85 (33.2 overs); Abdul Rehman Muzammil 17 (45); Ehsan Adil 4/19 (10.2 overs)		70 (19.2 overs); Saad Ali 23 (26); Ali Shafiq 4/14 (6.2 overs)

Khan Research Laboratories won by 27 runs
Khan Research Laboratories Ground, Rawalpindi
Umpires: Mohammad Sajid and Tariq Rasheed

- Khan Research Laboratories won the toss and elected to bat.
- Ammad Alam (United Bank Limited) made his first-class debut.

27–30 October 2017
Scorecard

Lahore Whites	v	Rawalpindi
247 (52.1 overs); Mohammad Irfan 54 (39); Abid Hasan 5/92 (19 overs)		162 (40.5 overs); Naved Malik 54 (38); Waqas Ahmed 7/79 (16.5 overs)
199 (59 overs); Mohammad Mohsin 84* (113); Nazar Hussain 4/80 (25 overs)		192 (47.4 overs); Behram Khan 55 (62); Umaid Asif 5/77 (21.4 overs)

Lahore Whites won by 92 runs
Mirpur Cricket Stadium, Mirpur
Umpires: Imtiaz Iqbal and Majid Hussain

- Rawalpindi won the toss and elected to field.
- Hamza Akbar (Lahore Whites) made his first-class debut.

===== Round 7 =====
2–5 November 2017
Scorecard

United Bank Limited	v	Habib Bank Limited
178 (47.4 overs); Saad Ali 44 (58); Umar Gul 5/53 (14 overs)		125 (46.4 overs); Azeem Ghumman 24 (65); Ehsan Adil 4/29 (15 overs)
309 (68.5 overs); Umar Akmal 116 (114); Amad Butt 4/118 (21.5 overs)		220 (61.2 overs); Azeem Ghumman 69 (137); Sohail Khan 5/55 (24.2 overs)

United Bank Limited won by 142 runs
Diamond Club Ground, Islamabad
Umpires: Adnan Rasheed and Mohammad Sajid

- Habib Bank Limited won the toss and elected to field.

2–5 November 2017
Scorecard

Lahore Whites	v	Karachi Whites
104 (33.3 overs); Fahad-ul-Haq 35 (52); Anwar Ali 6/40 (15 overs)		79 (25.5 overs); Faisal Iqbal 32* (56); Waqas Ahmed 6/37 (13 overs)
144/4 (63 overs); Usman Salahuddin 59* (163); Khurram Shahzad 2/22 (15 overs)

Match drawn
Lahore City Cricket Association Ground, Lahore
Umpires: Majid Hussain and Waseemuddin

- Karachi Whites won the toss and elected to field.
- No play was possible on day 1 due to fog and only 23 overs of play were possible on day 2.
- Moazzam Malik (Karachi Whites) made his first-class debut.

2–5 November 2017
Scorecard

Pakistan Television	v	Khan Research Laboratories
259 (70.4 overs); Ali Khan 82 (110); Nayyer Abbas 3/27 (8.4 overs)		131 (46 overs); Junaid Ali 34 (41); Tabish Khan 8/32 (18 overs)
37 (17.3 overs); Hasan Raza 13 (29); Ali Shafiq 4/10 (3.3 overs)		168/6 (58.3 overs); Abdul Rehman Muzammil 46 (76); Tabish Khan 3/43 (22 overs)

Khan Research Laboratories won by 4 wickets
Khan Research Laboratories Ground, Rawalpindi
Umpires: Nasir Hussain and Zameer Haider

- Pakistan Television won the toss and elected to bat.
- Azeem Dar (Khan Research Laboratories) made his first-class debut.
- Pakistan Television's total of 37 was the fifth-lowest total in the history of the Quaid-e-Azam Trophy.

2–5 November 2017
Scorecard

Federally Administered Tribal Areas	v	Rawalpindi
126 (34.5 overs); Asad Afridi 28 (26); Saad Altaf 8/62 (17.5 overs)		203 (56.3 overs); Umar Waheed 68 (79); Sohail Akhtar 3/35 (15 overs)
184 (36.4 overs); Sohail Akhtar 51 (24); Saad Altaf 8/79 (18.4 overs)		110/1 (22.5 overs); Sarmad Hameed 56* (70); Rehmatullah 1/20 (5 overs)

Rawalpindi won by 9 wickets
Mirpur Cricket Stadium, Mirpur
Umpires: Imtiaz Iqbal and Qaiser Waheed

- Rawalpindi won the toss and elected to field.
- Nisar Afridi and Rehmatullah (Federally Administered Tribal Areas) both made their first-class debuts.
- Saad Altaf (Rawalpindi) recorded the best bowling figures in a first-class match in Pakistan with 16 wickets for 141 runs.

== Super Eight stage ==
=== Tables ===
Group I
Team	Pld	W	L	D	Pts
Sui Northern Gas Pipelines (Q)	3	2	0	1	21
Habib Bank Limited	3	1	1	1	10
Lahore Blues	3	1	2	0	9
Lahore Whites	3	1	2	0	6

Group II
Team	Pld	W	L	D	Pts
Water and Power Development Authority (Q)	3	2	1	0	16
United Bank Limited	3	2	1	0	15
Sui Southern Gas Company	3	2	1	0	12
Khan Research Laboratories	3	0	3	0	0

(Q) The top team in each group advanced to the final

Position determined by total points, most matches won, fewest matches lost, followed by adjusted net run rate (matches with no result, i.e. those where both teams did not complete their first innings, were disregarded); matches finishing in a draw were decided on first innings scores, with points awarded as follows:
- Win by an innings = 10 points
- Win having led on first innings = 9 points
- Win having tied or trailed on first innings = 6 points
- Tie having led on first innings = 5 points
- Draw having led on first innings = 3 points
- Draw having tied on first innings, or tie having trailed on first innings = 2 points
- Draw with no result on first innings, or abandoned without a ball bowled = 1 point
- Loss, or draw having trailed on first innings = 0 points

=== Results ===
==== Group 1 ====
3–6 December 2017
Scorecard

Lahore Whites	v	Lahore Blues
141 (47.2 overs); Rizwan Hussain 42 (58); Bilawal Iqbal 4/42 (17 overs)		281 (75.1 overs); Saad Nasim 83 (90); Umaid Asif 4/73 (22 overs)
207 (54.1 overs); Anas Mahmood 54 (115); Aizaz Cheema 7/52 (19.1 overs)		70/1 (9.3 overs); Tayyab Tahir 41* (32); Waqas Ahmed 1/34 (5 overs)

Lahore Blues won by 9 wickets
United Bank Limited Sports Complex, Karachi
Umpires: Aaley Haider and Shameem Ansari

- Lahore Blues won the toss and elected to field.

3–6 December 2017
Scorecard

Sui Northern Gas Pipelines Limited	v	Habib Bank Limited
511 (150.1 overs); Khurram Shehzad 133 (248); Amad Butt 6/106 (38.1 overs)		202 (79.2 overs); Rameez Aziz 59* (116); Yasir Shah 4/50 (23.2 overs)
		291/6 (107 overs) (f/o); Ahmed Shehzad 148 (265); Hussain Talat 3/39 (13 overs)

Match drawn
National Bank of Pakistan Sports Complex, Karachi
Umpires: Khalid Mahmood and Rashid Riaz

- Habib Bank Limited won the toss and elected to field.

9–12 December 2017
Scorecard

Sui Northern Gas Pipelines Limited	v	Lahore Whites
411 (104.2 overs); Khurram Shehzad 115 (178); Umaid Asif 6/114 (31 overs)		344 (83.4 overs); Mohammad Mohsin 96 (172); Azizullah 5/60 (15.4 overs)
93 (36 overs); Hussain Talat 39* (70); Waqas Ahmed 5/40 (14 overs)		88 (29.1 overs); Anas Mahmood 21 (25); Mohammad Abbas 5/44 (14 overs)

Sui Northern Gas Pipelines Limited won by 72 runs
Niaz Stadium, Hyderabad
Umpires: Aaley Haider and Tahir Rasheed

- Lahore Whites won the toss and elected to field.

9–12 December 2017
Scorecard

Habib Bank Limited	v	Lahore Blues
252 (84 overs); Salman Afridi 126* (245); Saif-ur-Rehman 5/69 (19.3 overs)		68 (20.5 overs); Bilawal Iqbal 29 (27); Umar Gul 5/19 (8 overs)
95/3 (18.3 overs); Amad Butt 44* (35); Aizaz Cheema 3/30 (8 overs)		276 (67.3 overs) (f/o); Saad Nasim 60 (56); Umar Gul 3/56 (16 overs)

Habib Bank Limited won by 7 wickets
State Bank of Pakistan Sports Complex, Karachi
Umpires: Imtiaz Iqbal and Khalid Mahmood

- Lahore Blues won the toss and elected to field.

15–18 December 2017
Scorecard

Lahore Blues	v	Sui Northern Gas Pipelines Limited
89 (29.2 overs); Raza Ali Dar 37* (51); Azizullah 5/19 (9.2 overs)		92 (38.1 overs); Mohammad Rizwan 23 (41); Aizaz Cheema 5/33 (15.1 overs)
70 (15.1 overs); Waqas Saleem 18 (29); Mohammad Abbas 6/32 (7.1 overs)		70/4 (21.2 overs); Azhar Ali 26 (42); Aizaz Cheema 4/33 (10.2 overs)

Sui Northern Gas Pipelines Limited won by 6 wickets
Niaz Stadium, Hyderabad
Umpires: Asif Yaqoob and Tahir Rasheed

- Sui Northern Gas Pipelines Limited won the toss and elected to field.
- Ali Mustafa (Lahore Blues) made his first-class debut.

15–18 December 2017
Scorecard

Habib Bank Limited	v	Lahore Whites
226 (80.2 overs); Amad Butt 82 (143); Adnan Rasool 4/28 (14.2 overs)		172 (62 overs); Fahad-ul-Haq 50 (105); Abdur Rehman 4/75 (24 overs)
101 (48 overs); Amad Butt 35 (78); Mohammad Irfan 5/55 (24 overs)		159/5 (43.3 overs); Salman Fayyaz 65* (138); Amad Butt 3/17 (10 overs)

Lahore Whites won by 5 wickets
National Stadium, Karachi
Umpires: Imtiaz Iqbal and Khalid Mahmood

- Habib Bank Limited won the toss and elected to bat.

==== Group 2 ====
3–6 December 2017
Scorecard

United Bank Limited	v	Sui Southern Gas Company
252 (79.3 overs); Shan Masood 75 (160); Ahmed Jamal 6/34 (17.3 overs)		279 (87.5 overs); Fawad Alam 124 (222); Sohail Khan 5/72 (24.5 overs)
328/8d (80 overs); Umar Akmal 148 (166); Kashif Bhatti 5/102 (24)		152 (43.5 overs); Asif Zakir 27 (40); Mohammad Asghar 4/26 (8.5 overs)

United Bank Limited won by 149 runs
Niaz Stadium, Hyderabad
Umpires: Ghaffar Kazmi and Nasir Hussain

- Sui Southern Gas Corporation won the toss and elected to field.

3–6 December 2017
Scorecard

Khan Research Laboratories	v	Water and Power Development Authority
95 (42.3 overs); Junaid Ali 40 (98); Waqas Maqsood 9/32 (16.3 overs)		167 (49.3 overs); Khalid Usman 86 (115); Sadaf Hussain 5/51 (17 overs)
65 (28.4 overs); Saif Badar 22 (24); Mohammad Asif 6/23 (11 overs)

Water and Power Development Authority won by an innings and 7 runs
State Bank of Pakistan Sports Complex, Karachi
Umpires: Imtiaz Iqbal and Shozab Raza

- Water and Power Development Authority won the toss and elected to field.
- Waqas Maqsood (Water and Power Development Authority) took his best figures in an innings in a first-class match.

9–12 December 2017
Scorecard

Khan Research Laboratories	v	Sui Southern Gas Company
177 (72.3 overs); Usman Arshad 59 (114); Kashif Bhatti 5/71 (30.3 overs)		148 (49.4 overs); Saifullah Bangash 63 (98); Ahmed Bashir 7/53 (17 overs)
152 (62.2 overs); Junaid Ali 60 (88); Kashif Bhatti 4/31 (11.2 overs)		182/4 (46.2 overs); Babar Azam 51 (65); Ahmed Bashir 2/55 (13 overs)

Sui Southern Gas Corporation won by 6 wickets
United Bank Limited Sports Complex, Karachi
Umpires: Shozab Raza and Tariq Rasheed

- Sui Southern Gas Corporation won the toss and elected to field.

9–12 December 2017
Scorecard

Water and Power Development Authority	v	United Bank Limited
243 (98.3 overs); Mohammad Saad 57 (115); Mir Hamza 5/45 (24.3 overs)		275 (81.5 overs); Mohammad Nawaz 88 (179); Khalid Usman 4/55 (19.5 overs)
220 (67.5 overs); Salman Butt 66 (113); Mohammad Asghar 5/50 (17.5 overs)		131 (49.3 overs); Mohammad Nawaz 33 (89); Zahid Mansoor 4/32 (15.3 overs)

Water and Power Development Authority won by 57 runs
National Stadium, Karachi
Umpires: Ghaffar Kazmi and Rashid Riaz

- Water and Power Development Authority won the toss and elected to bat.

15–18 December 2017
Scorecard

Khan Research Laboratories	v	United Bank Limited
151 (50.1 overs); Saif Badar 53 (94); Mohammad Asghar 3/28 (8.1 overs)		283 (79.3 overs); Saad Ali 109 (179); Yasir Ali 3/49 (12 overs)
226 (93.1 overs); Jaahid Ali 83 (192); Mohammad Asghar 5/74 (36 overs)		94/4 (15.1 overs); Sohaib Maqsood 29 (22); Nayyer Abbas 1/10 (1 over)

United Bank Limited won by 6 wickets
United Bank Limited Sports Complex, Karachi
Umpires: Ahmed Shahab and Shameem Ansari

- Khan Research Laboratories won the toss and elected to bat.

15–18 December 2017
Scorecard

Water and Power Development Authority	v	Sui Southern Gas Company
232 (67 overs); Khalid Usman 78 (88); Kashif Bhatti 3/40 (8 overs)		160 (50.5 overs); Sami Aslam 28 (68); Mohammad Asif 5/72 (20.5 overs)
229/8d (86.5 overs); Khushdil Shah 54 (94); Kashif Bhatti 4/101 (24.5 overs)		303/3 (56.4 overs); Sami Aslam 133* (162); Khalid Usman 1/41 (9 overs)

Sui Southern Gas Corporation won by 7 wickets
State Bank of Pakistan Sports Complex, Karachi
Umpires: Shozab Raza and Tariq Rasheed

- Water and Power Development Authority won the toss and elected to bat.

== Final ==
21–25 December 2017
Scorecard

Sui Northern Gas Pipelines Limited	v	Water and Power Development Authority
259 (102 overs); Iftikhar Ahmed 73 (154); Wahab Riaz 4/61 (24 overs)		271 (92.2 overs); Kamran Akmal 67 (143); Mohammad Abbas 4/57 (25 overs)
268 (94.2 overs); Iftikhar Ahmed 106 (254); Waqas Maqsood 3/54 (21 overs)		153 (45 overs); Aamer Sajjad 38 (53); Samiullah Khan 8/62 (17 overs)

Sui Northern Gas Pipelines Limited won by 103 runs
National Stadium, Karachi
Umpires: Ahsan Raza and Khalid Mahmood
Player of the match: Samiullah Khan (Sui Northern Gas Pipelines Limited)

- Water and Power Development Authority won the toss and elected to field.
