= List of Central Punjab squads =

Central Punjab cricket team is a − first-class cricket team in Pakistan. The team with five other new teams was introduced as a part of new domestic structure by − Pakistan Cricket Board (PCB) on 31 August 2019.

== 2019 squads ==
On 3 September 2019, PCB announced both First XI and Second XI squads of the team. Babar Azam was announced as captain of the team's First XI, while Ali Waqas was named as Second XI's captain for the season.

=== First XI ===
1. Babar Azam (c)
2. Ahmed Shehzad (vc)
3. Azhar Ali
4. Hasan Ali
5. Ahmed Bashir
6. Ali Shan
7. Bilal Asif
8. Ehsan Adil
9. Fahim Ashraf
10. Kamran Akmal (wk)
11. Mohammad Saad
12. Naseem Shah
13. Rizwan Hussain
14. Saad Nasim
15. Salman Butt
16. Umar Akmal
17. Usman Salahuddin
18. Waqas Maqsood
19. Zafar Gohar
20. Nasir Nawaz
21. Nauman Anwar
22. Usman Qadir

=== Second XI ===
1. Ali Waqas (c)
2. Abdullah Shafique
3. Ahmed Safi Abdullah
4. Aizaz Cheema (mentor)
5. Ali Zaryab
6. Asad Raza
7. Atiq-ur-Rehman
8. Ayaz Tasawwar
9. Bilawal Iqbal
10. Farhan Khan (wk)
11. Irfan Khan
12. Muhammad Akhlaq
13. Mohammad Ali
14. Raza Ali Dar
15. Suleman Shafqat
16. Zahid Mansoor

== 2020 Squads ==
Team management retained several of their players in both First XI and Second XI from the previous year's squads. Pakistan's Test and ODI opening batsman Abid Ali was included in this year's squad and some of the Second XI players from last year were selected in First XI squad as a reward for their excellent performances, and some were demoted in team's Second XI.

=== First XI ===
1. Abid Ali
2. Azhar Ali
3. Muhammad Akhlaq
4. Naseem Shah
5. Kamran Akmal (wk)
6. Salman Butt
7. Ahmed Shehzad
8. Usman Salahuddin
9. Rizwan Hussain
10. Abdullah Shafique
11. Ali Zaryab
12. Fahim Ashraf
13. Hasan Ali
14. Ahmed Bashir
15. Zafar Gohar
16. Usman Qadir
17. Bilal Asif
18. Ehsan Adil
19. Waqas Maqsood
20. Mohammad Saad
21. Saad Nasim
22. Suleman Shafqat
23. Mohammad Ali
24. Bilawal Iqbal
25. Irfan Khan
26. Babar Azam (c)
27. Farhan Khan (wk)
28. Ahmed Safi Abdullah
29. Muhammad Bin Pasha

=== Second XI ===
1. Ali Shan
2. Nauman Anwar
3. Raza Ali Dar
