= List of Faisalabad cricketers =

This is a list of cricketers who have played matches for Pakistan's Faisalabad cricket team in first-class, List A or Twenty20 cricket.

- Aaley Haider
- Aamer Nazir (cricketer, born 1966)
- Abdul Mannan (cricketer)
- Abdul Samad (Pakistani cricketer)
- Abdur Rauf (cricketer)
- Ahmed Hayat
- Ahmed Safi Abdullah
- Ahsan Raza
- Ali Rafiq
- Ali Raza (cricketer, born 1987)
- Ali Shan (cricketer)
- Ali Waqas
- Ameer Hamza (cricketer, born 1994)
- Ammar Mahmood
- Aqeel Ahmed (cricketer)
- Asad Ali
- Asad Raza (cricketer)
- Asad Zarar
- Asif Ali (cricketer, born 1991)
- Asif Hussain
- Atiq-ur-Rehman (Faisalabad cricketer)
- Bilal Haider
- Ehsan Adil
- Faheem Ashraf
- Hasan Mahmood
- Humayun Farkhan
- Ibtisam Sheikh
- Iftikhar Ahmed (Faisalabad cricketer)
- Ijaz Ahmed (cricketer, born 1969)
- Imran Ali (cricketer, born 1983)
- Imran Khalid
- Inzamam-ul-Haq
- Kamran Naeem
- Kashif Naved
- Masood Anwar
- Misbah-ul-Haq
- Mohammad Hafeez
- Mohammad Imran (cricketer, born 1996)
- Mohammad Laeeq
- Mohammad Nawaz (cricketer, born 1970)
- Mohammad Nawaz (cricketer, born 1974)
- Mohammad Ramzan (cricketer)
- Mohammad Salman (cricketer)
- Mohammad Sami (cricketer, born 1984)
- Mohammad Talha
- Mohammad Zahid (Faisalabad cricketer)
- Mohammad Zeeshan
- Naseer Shaukat
- Naved Latif
- Raees Ahmed
- Saeed Ajmal
- Sajjad Akbar
- Samiullah Khan (cricketer)
- Shahid Nawaz
- Shahid Nazir
- Tauqeer Hussain
- Usman Arshad (Pakistani cricketer)
- Wasim Haider
- Zahid Ahmed (Pakistani cricketer)
- Zahoor Elahi
- Zahoor Khan
- Zeeshan Butt
