= List of Water and Power Development Authority cricketers =

This is a list of cricketers who have played matches for the Water and Power Development Authority cricket team in Pakistan.

== Players ==
- Aamer Sajjad 2004/05-2015/16
- Afzal 1977/78
- Ali Raza
- Amjad Siddique
- Aqeel Ahmed
- Arshad Iqbal
- Asif Ali
- Atiq-ur-Rehman
- Ayaz Tasawwar
- Bilal Khilji
- Farrukh Raza
- Haafiz Shahid Yaqoob 1984–1987
- Hafiz Saad Nasim 2009/10–2012/13
- Hasnain Shah
- Iftikhar Malik
- Majid Habib
- Iftikhar-ul-Haq 1977–78
- Ikramullah Sheikh 2000/2001–2001/2002
- Imran Ali
- Imran Nazir
- Mohammad Imran Tahir 1998–1999 2004–2007
- Javed Hayat
- Javed Ismail 1998
- Kashif Raza 1999/00
- Khalid Usman 2018–19
- Majid Habib 1977/78
- Maqsood-ul-Haq
- Mesome Hussain
- Mohammad Akram Raza 1984–1985
- Mohammad Ali
- Mohammad Asif
- Mohammad Ayub
- Mohammad Azharullah
- Mohammad Imran Khan
- Mohammad Irfan Jr. 2014-
- Mohammad Kamran Hussain 2000/01–2001/02
- Mohammad Junaid Khan
- Mohammad Mohsin
- Mohammad Saad
- Mohammad Saleem Mughal
- Mohammad Yousuf
- Muhammad Hassan Adnan Syed
- Mushtaq Ahmed
- Najeeb Amar
- Naseer Ahmed, one appearance in Patron's Trophy competition of 1977/78
- Naseer Akram
- Obaidullah Sarwar
- Rafatullah Mohmand 2000/01-2014/15
- Rana Naved-ul-Hasan 2001–2015
- Saeed Ajmal
- Saeed Anwar
- Sajjad Akbar
- Salman Butt
- Shabbir Ahmed Khan
- Shakeel Khan
- Shoaib Khan
- Shujauddin 1977
- Sohaib Maqsood 2013
- Sohaibullah 2016–17
- Shoaib Nasir
- Syed Inzamam-ul-Haq 2006-07 /Umar rafiq 2010–11
- Umaid Asif
- Waqar Malik
- Waqas Maqsood
- Wasim Haider
- Zaheer Khan
- Zahid Mansoor
- Zulfiqar Babar
