= List of Habib Bank Limited cricketers =

This is a list of cricketers who have played matches for the Habib Bank Limited cricket team.

== Players ==
- Aamer Sohail
- Abbas Afridi
- Abdul Qadir
- Abdur Rehman
- Aftab Alam
- Ahmed Shehzad
- Ahsan Jamil
- Ahsan Raza
- Akram Raza
- Ali Shafiq
- Amad Butt
- Anwar Miandad
- Asad Shafiq
- Asim Kamal
- Azhar Mahmood
- Bilal Shafayat
- Danish Kaneria
- Ehsan Adil 2012–present
- Faheem Ashraf
- Haider Rameez
- Hasan Raza
- Hasan Raza
- Imam-ul-Haq
- Imran Farhat
- Israr-ul-Haq
- Jamal Anwar
- Javed Miandad
- Kabir Khan
- Kamran Hussain
- Khurram Shehzad
- Rafatullah Mohmand
- Rameez Aziz
- Mohsin Khan
- Naeem Khan
- Nauman Shabbir
- Saad Khan
- Shahid Afridi
- Saleem Elahi
- Saleem Malik
- Salman Afridi
- Sajjad Ali
- Shaukat Mirza
- Tahir Rasheed
- Taufeeq Umar
- Umar Gul
- Waheed Mirza
- Yamin Ahmadzai
- Younis Khan
- Zohaib Khan
