= 2024 Lahore Qalandars season =

Pakistani cricket team season

Lahore Qalandars
2024 season
- Coach: Aaqib Javed
- Captain: Shaheen Afridi
- Ground(s): Gaddafi Stadium
- PSL 2024: League stage
- Most runs: Rassie van der Dussen (364)
- Most wickets: Shaheen Afridi (14)

Lahore Qalandars is a franchise cricket team that represents Lahore in the Pakistan Super League (PSL). They were one of the six teams that were competing in the 2024 Pakistan Super League. The team was coached by Aaqib Javed, and captained by Shaheen Afridi.

== Squad ==
- Players with international caps are listed in **bold**.
- Ages are given as of 17 February 2024, the date of the first match in the tournament.

No.	Name	Nationality	Birth date	Category	Batting style	Bowling style	Year signed	Notes
Batsmen
15	**Mirza Tahir Baig**	Pakistan	11 March 1999 (aged 24)	Silver	Right-handed	—	2023	
28	**Dan Lawrence**	England	12 July 1997 (aged 26)	Silver	Right-handed	Right-arm off-break	2024	
39	**Fakhar Zaman**	Pakistan	10 April 1990 (aged 33)	Platinum	Left-handed	Left-arm orthodox	2017	
51	**Sahibzada Farhan**	Pakistan	6 March 1996 (aged 27)	Diamond	Right-handed	–	2024	
54	**Bhanuka Rajapaksa**	Sri Lanka	24 October 1991 (aged 32)	Supplementary	Left-handed	Right-arm medium	2024	
57	**Abdullah Shafique**	Pakistan	20 November 1999 (aged 24)	Gold	Right-handed	Right-arm off-break	2022	
72	**Rassie van der Dussen**	South Africa	7 February 1989 (aged 35)	Platinum	Right-handed	Right-arm leg break	2024	
All-rounders
1	Salman Fayyaz	Pakistan	11 August 1997 (aged 26)	—N/a	Left-handed	Right-arm leg break	2024	Partial replacement for Bhanuka Rajapaksa
06	**George Linde**	South Africa	4 December 1991 (aged 32)	—N/a	Left-handed	Left-arm orthodox	2024	Full replacement for Rashid Khan
24	**Sikandar Raza**	Zimbabwe	24 April 1986 (aged 37)	Gold	Right-handed	Right-arm off break	2023	
26	**Carlos Brathwaite**	West Indies	18 July 1998 (aged 25)	—N/a	Right-handed	Right-arm fast-medium	2024	
27	**David Wiese**	Namibia	18 May 1985 (aged 38)	Diamond	Right-handed	Right-arm fast-medium	2019	Vice-captain
33	Ahsan Hafeez	Pakistan	30 March 1998 (aged 25)	Silver	Left-handed	Left-arm orthodox	2023	
82	**Kamran Ghulam**	Pakistan	10 October 1995 (aged 28)	Supplementary	Right-handed	Left-arm orthodox	2024	
Wicket-keepers
3	**Lorcan Tucker**	Ireland	10 September 1996 (aged 27)	—N/a	Right-handed	—	2024	Partial replacement for Dan Lawrence
4	**Shai Hope**	West Indies	10 November 1993 (aged 30)	Supplementary	Right-handed	Left-arm medium	2023	
77	**Sam Billings**	England	15 June 1991 (aged 32)	—N/a	Right-handed	—	2023	Full replacement for Rassie van der Dussen
Bowlers
10	**Shaheen Afridi**	Pakistan	6 April 2000 (aged 23)	Platinum	Left-handed	Left-arm fast	2018	Captain
11	Jahandad Khan	Pakistan	16 June 2003 (aged 20)	Emerging	Right-handed	Left-arm medium-fast	2024	
12	**Zaman Khan**	Pakistan	10 September 2001 (aged 22)	Gold	Right-handed	Right-arm medium-fast	2022	
14	Mohammad Imran	Pakistan	20 January 2001 (aged 23)	Silver	Right-handed	Left-arm medium-fast	2024	
17	Syed Faridoun	Pakistan	15 May 2001 (aged 22)	Emerging	Right-handed	Left-arm unorthodox	2024	
19	**Rashid Khan**	Afghanistan	20 September 1998 (aged 25)	Silver	Right-handed	Right-arm leg break	2021	
150	**Haris Rauf**	Pakistan	7 November 1993 (aged 30)	Gold	Right-handed	Right-arm fast	2019	
455	Tayyab Abbas	Pakistan	15 September 1993 (aged 30)	Supplementary	Right-handed	Right-arm fast-medium	2024	

- Source: ESPNcricinfo

== Management and coaching staff ==
Name	Position
Atif Rana	CEO
Sameen Rana	COO and Manager
Aaqib Javed	Director of cricket operations and Head coach
Farooq Anwar	Assistant team manager
Mansoor Rana	Batting coach
Waqas Ahmed	Bowling coach
Shehzad Butt	Fielding coach
Ben Dunk	Power-hitting coach
Hiten Maisuria	Physiotherapist
Nabeel Edgar Pace	Data analyst
Malang Ali	Masseur

== Kit manufacturers and sponsors ==
Kit manufacturer	Shirt sponsor (chest)	Shirt sponsor (back)	Chest branding	Sleeve branding
Gym Armour	Pakistan State Oil	Lahore Entertainment City	Mughal Steel	Bank of Punjab, AirSial, Kausar Rana Trust

Home kit

Away kit

== Season standings ==
=== Points table ===
Pos	Team	Pld	W	L	NR	Pts	NRR
1	Multan Sultans (R)	10	7	3	0	14	1.150
2	Peshawar Zalmi (3rd)	10	6	3	1	13	0.147
3	Islamabad United (C)	10	5	4	1	11	0.224
4	Quetta Gladiators (4th)	10	5	4	1	11	−0.921
5	Karachi Kings	10	4	6	0	8	−0.192
6	Lahore Qalandars	10	1	8	1	3	−0.554

Source: ESPNcricinfo

The four top-ranked teams qualified for the Playoffs.
Advanced to Qualifier
Advanced to Eliminator 1

Notes

- C = Champions;
- R = Runner-up;
- (x) = Position at the end of the tournament;

== Group fixtures ==
Match 1
17 February 2024
20:00 (D/N)
Scorecard

(H) Lahore Qalandars; 195/5 (20 overs)	v	Islamabad United; 200/2 (18.2 overs)
Rassie van der Dussen 71* (41); Tymal Mills 2/45 (4 overs)		Shadab Khan 74* (41); Salman Fayyaz 1/23 (2.2 overs)

Islamabad United won by 8 wickets
Gaddafi Stadium, Lahore
Umpires: Aleem Dar (Pak) and Michael Gough (Eng)
Player of the match: Shadab Khan (Islamabad United)

- Islamabad United won the toss and elected to field.
- Ubaid Shah (Islamabad United) and Salman Fayyaz (Lahore Qalandars) both made their T20 debuts.

Match 4
19 February 2024
19:00 (D/N)
Scorecard

(H) Lahore Qalandars; 187/7 (20 overs)	v	Quetta Gladiators; 188/5 (19.1 overs)
Sahibzada Farhan 62 (43); Akeal Hosein 2/17 (4 overs)		Khawaja Nafay 60* (31); Sikandar Raza 1/25 (3 overs)

Quetta Gladiators won by 5 wickets
Gaddafi Stadium, Lahore
Umpires: Aleem Dar (Pak) and Michael Gough (Eng)
Player of the match: Khawaja Nafay (Quetta Gladiators)

- Lahore Qalandars won the toss and elected to bat.

Match 7
21 February 2024
19:00 (D/N)
Scorecard

Lahore Qalandars; 166/5 (20 overs)	v	(H) Multan Sultans; 170/5 (19 overs)
Rassie van der Dussen 54 (37); Mohammad Ali 2/28 (4 overs)		Mohammad Rizwan 82 (59); Shaheen Afridi 2/25 (4 overs)

Multan Sultans won by 5 wickets
Multan Cricket Stadium, Multan
Umpires: Chris Gaffaney (NZ) and Rashid Riaz (Pak)
Player of the match: Mohammad Rizwan (Multan Sultans)

- Lahore Qalandars won the toss and elected to bat

Match 10
24 February 2024
19:00 (D/N)
Scorecard

(H) Lahore Qalandars; 175/6 (20 overs)	v	Karachi Kings; 176/8 (20 overs)
Sahibzada Farhan 72* (45); Hasan Ali 2/29 (4 overs)		Kieron Pollard 58 (33); Ahsan Hafeez 2/19 (2 overs)

Karachi Kings won by 2 wickets
Gaddafi Stadium, Lahore
Umpires: Richard Illingworth (Eng) and Ahsan Raza (Pak)
Player of the match: Kieron Pollard (Karachi Kings)

- Karachi Kings won the toss and elected to field.

Match 12
25 February 2024
19:00 (D/N)
Scorecard

Peshawar Zalmi; 211/4 (20 overs)	v	(H) Lahore Qalandars; 203/6 (20 overs)
Saim Ayub 88 (55); Shaheen Afridi 3/33 (4 overs)		Rassie van der Dussen 104* (52); Naveen-ul-Haq 2/50 (4 overs)

Peshawar Zalmi won by 8 runs
Gaddafi Stadium, Lahore
Umpires: Richard Illingworth (Eng) and Ahsan Raza (Pak)
Player of the match: Saim Ayub (Peshawar Zalmi)

- Lahore Qalandars won the toss and elected to field.

Match 14
27 February 2024
19:00 (D/N)
Scorecard

Multan Sultans; 214/4 (20 overs)	v	(H) Lahore Qalandars; 154 (17 overs)
Usman Khan 96 (55); Shaheen Afridi 2/39 (4 overs)		Sahibzada Farhan 31 (21); Usama Mir 6/40 (4 overs)

Multan Sultans won by 60 runs
Gaddafi Stadium, Lahore
Umpires: Ruchira Palliyaguruge (SL) and Ahsan Raza (Pak)
Player of the match: Usman Khan (Multan Sultans)

- Multan Sultans won the toss and elected to bat.

Match 17
2 March 2024
14:00
Scorecard

Peshawar Zalmi	v	Lahore Qalandars

Rawalpindi Cricket Stadium, Rawalpindi
Umpires: Ruchira Palliyaguruge (SL) and Ahsan Raza (Pak)

- No toss.
- No play was possible due to rain.

Match 23
6 March 2024
19:00 (D/N)
Scorecard

Lahore Qalandars; 162/7 (20 overs)	v	(H) Islamabad United; 145 (18.5 overs)
Rassie van der Dussen 64 (44); Rumman Raees 2/19 (3 overs)		Faheem Ashraf 41* (31); Zaman Khan 4/37 (3.5 overs)

Lahore Qalandars won by 17 runs
Rawalpindi Cricket Stadium, Rawalpindi
Umpires: Ahsan Raza (Pak) and Alex Wharf (Eng)
Player of the match: Rassie van der Dussen (Lahore Qalandars)

- Islamabad United won the toss and elected to field.
- Tayyab Abbas (Lahore Qalandars) made his T20 debut.

Match 26
9 March 2024
19:00 (D/N)
Scorecard

Lahore Qalandars; 177/5 (20 overs)	v	(H) Karachi Kings; 179/7 (20 overs)
Abdullah Shafique 55 (39); Zahid Mahmood 2/27 (4 overs)		James Vince 42 (27); Tayyab Abbas 2/23 (3 overs)

Karachi Kings won by 3 wickets
National Stadium, Karachi
Umpires: Richard Illingworth (Eng) and Rashid Riaz (Pak)
Player of the match: Irfan Khan (Karachi Kings)

- Karachi Kings won the toss and elected to field.

Match 28
10 March 2024
19:00 (D/N)
Scorecard

Lahore Qalandars; 166/4 (20 overs)	v	Quetta Gladiators; 169/4 (20 overs)
Abdullah Shafique 59* (39); Abrar Ahmed 2/31 (4 overs)		Saud Shakeel 88* (65); Jahandad Khan 2/30 (4 overs)

Quetta Gladiators won by 6 wickets
National Stadium, Karachi
Umpires: Chris Gaffaney (NZ) and Rashid Riaz (Pak)
Player of the match: Saud Shakeel (Quetta Gladiators)

- Lahore Qalandars won the toss and elected to bat.
- As a result of this match, Quetta Gladiators qualified for the playoffs and Karachi Kings were eliminated from the tournament.

== Statistics ==
=== Most runs ===
Player	Inns	Runs	Ave	HS	50s	100s
Rassie van der Dussen	7	364	72.80	104*	3	1
Sahibzada Farhan	8	266	38.00	72*	3	0
Abdullah Shafique	5	159	53.00	59*	2	0
Fakhar Zaman	8	157	19.62	54	1	0
Shaheen Afridi	6	107	17.83	55	1	0

- Source: ESPNcricinfo

=== Most wickets ===
Player	Inns	Wkts	Ave	BBI
Shaheen Afridi	9	14	22.14	3/33
Zaman Khan	9	11	28.72	4/37
Jahandad Khan	9	5	45.20	2/30
Ahsan Hafeez	4	3	22.33	2/19
Sikandar Raza	7	3	50.33	1/20

- Source: ESPNcricinfo
