= Sadaf Hussain =

Pakistani cricketer

Personal information
- Full name: Sadaf Hussein
- Born: 7 December 1989 (age 36); Chakwal, Punjab, Pakistan
- Height: 6 ft 5 in (196 cm)
- Batting: Left-handed
- Bowling: Left-arm medium-fast
- Role: Bowler
- Source: ESPNCricinfo, 11 April 2016

Sadaf Hussain (born 7 December 1989) is a Pakistani former cricketer. He has played for Khan Research Laboratories, Federal Areas, and Rawalpindi Rams.

== Career ==
He made his List A debut against the Abbottabad Rhinos at Sargodha on 18 February 2010.

When the Pakistani cricket team announced their ODI and T20 squad for the tour of the West Indies in April 2011 Sadaf was initially picked as part of the reserves; however, the exclusion of Aizaz Cheema due to fitness issues resulted in Sadaf's inclusion in the squad.

He was the leading wicket-taker for Khan Research Laboratories in the 2017–18 Quaid-e-Azam Trophy, with 47 dismissals in nine matches.

In April 2018, he was named in Khyber Pakhtunkhwa's squad for the 2018 Pakistan Cup. He made his Twenty20 debut for Rawalpindi in the 2018–19 National T20 Cup on 14 December 2018.

In September 2019, he was named in Northern's squad for the 2019–20 Quaid-e-Azam Trophy tournament.
