= Rehmatullah (cricketer) =

Pakistani cricketer (born 1998)

Personal information
- Born: 1 March 1998 (age 28)
- Source: Cricinfo, 4 November 2017

Rehmatullah (born 1 March 1998) is a Pakistani cricketer. He made his first-class debut for Federally Administered Tribal Areas in the 2017–18 Quaid-e-Azam Trophy on 2 November 2017.
