= Samiullah Khan (cricketer) =

Pakistani cricketer (born 1982)

Samiullah Niazi
Personal information
- Full name: Samiullah Khan Niazi
- Born: 4 August 1982 (age 44); Mianwali, Punjab, Pakistan
- Batting: Right-handed
- Bowling: Left-arm medium-fast

International information
- National side: Pakistan
- ODI debut (cap 161): 21 January 2008 v Zimbabwe
- Last ODI: 24 January 2008 v Zimbabwe

Domestic team information
- Years: Team
- 2000/01–2002/03: Sargodha
- 2003/04–2012/13: Faisalabad
- 2004/05–2018/19: Sui Northern Gas
- 2004/05–2015: Faisalabad Wolves
- 2007/08: North West Frontier Province

Career statistics
Competition	ODI	FC	LA	T20
Matches	2	116	61	53
Runs scored	–	895	107	33
Batting average	–	10.28	7.64	11.00
100s/50s	–	0/0	0/0	0/0
Top score	–	41	12*	12
Balls bowled	120	20,272	2,917	1,114
Wickets	0	527	71	55
Bowling average	–	18.73	29.11	23.34
5 wickets in innings	–	26	0	0
10 wickets in match	–	10	0	0
Best bowling	–	8/62	4/23	4/27
Catches/stumpings	0/–	25/–	7/–	18/–
- Source: CricketArchive, 26 January 2025

Samiullah Khan Niazi (born 4 August 1982) is a Pakistani cricket coach and former first-class cricketer who played for Sargodha, Faisalabad and Pakistan as a left-arm medium-fast bowler.

Niazi was a swing bowler with epic line and length. Due to his ability to move the ball, he was selected in the National team and in 2006.

Samiullah Khan Niazi was one of the leading wicket-takers in the 2005–06 Pakistani first-class season with 75 wickets at 18.36. He was a late inclusion for Pakistan's 2006 tour of England, replacing Rana Naved-ul-Hasan. He represented Pakistan when he played two one day internationals against Zimbabwe at Karachi and Hyderabad in 2008. He was also first attack bowler of Pakistan A in Euroasia cup tournament where they beat India in final. He is a genuine left arm swing bowler. He was a member of the Faisalabad Wolves team which won the International 20:20 Club Championship-2005 in England.

In the final of the 2017–18 Quaid-e-Azam Trophy, he took his career-best bowling figures of 8 for 62 in the second innings and his 25th five-wicket haul in first-class cricket. This lead Sui Northern Gas Pipelines Limited to their third Quaid-e-Azam Trophy in four years and he was named as man of the match.

Since his retirement he has become a coach, including being the assistant coach to the Northern U19 Whites.
