= Hamza Akbar (cricketer) =

Pakistani cricketer (born 1995)

Personal information
- Born: 28 October 1995 (age 31); Lahore, Pakistan
- Source: Cricinfo, 30 October 2017

Hamza Akbar (born 28 October 1995) is a Pakistani cricketer. He made his first-class debut for Lahore Whites in the 2017–18 Quaid-e-Azam Trophy on 27 October 2017.
