= Aamer Nazir (cricketer, born 1966) =

Pakistani cricketer (born 1966)

Mohammad Aamer Nazir Sheikh (born 6 April 1966 in Multan; generally known as Aamer Nazir) is a Pakistani former first-class cricketer active 1986–2000 who played for Faisalabad and Islamabad. Aamer Nazir was a right-handed batsman and a wicket-keeper. He scored 872 career runs with a highest score of 96. He held 33 catches in his 22 first-class appearances and completed six stumpings.
