= Wilayat Mohammad =

Pakistani cricketer (born 1991)

Personal information
- Full name: Wilayat Mohammad
- Born: 13 January 1991 (age 35)
- Source: Cricinfo, 10 October 2017

Wilayat Mohammad (born 13 January 1991) is a Pakistani cricketer. He made his first-class debut for Federally Administered Tribal Areas in the 2017–18 Quaid-e-Azam Trophy on 9 October 2017.
