= Inam Javed =

Pakistani cricketer (born 1991)

Personal information
- Born: 13 November 1991 (age 34)
- Source: Cricinfo, 10 October 2017

Inam Javed (born 13 November 1991) is a Pakistani cricketer. He made his first-class debut for Lahore Blues in the 2017–18 Quaid-e-Azam Trophy on 9 October 2017.
