= Ali Asad (cricketer, born 1988) =

Pakistani cricketer (born 1988)

Personal information
- Born: 25 December 1988 (age 37); Karachi, Sindh, Pakistan
- Batting: Left-handed
- Role: Wicketkeeper batsman
Medal record
Men's Cricket
Representing Pakistan
South Asian Games
Bronze medal – third place	2010 Dhaka	Team
- Source: Cricinfo, 28 November 2015

Ali Asad (born 25 December 1988) is a Pakistani cricketer. A left-handed batsman and wicket-keeper, he represents Karachi cricket teams, having played for their Whites, Blues, Zebras and Dolphins sides. He scored his maiden first-class century in only his third match, while opening the batting for Karachi Blues against Peshawar. He has also represented Pakistan Under-19s, averaging 37.20 in Under-19 Test matches, and 45.40 in Under-19 One Day Internationals.

He was the leading run-scorer for National Bank of Pakistan in the 2017–18 Quaid-e-Azam Trophy, with 487 runs in seven matches. He was also the leading run-scorer for National Bank of Pakistan in the 2018–19 Quaid-e-Azam Trophy, with 371 runs in seven matches.

In September 2019, he was named in Northern's squad for the 2019–20 Quaid-e-Azam Trophy tournament.
