= Pakistani cricket team in England in 2018 =

International cricket tour

	England	Pakistan
- Dates: 28 April – 5 June 2018
Captains	Joe Root	Sarfaraz Ahmed

Test series
- Result: 2-match series drawn 1–1
Most runs	Jos Buttler (161)	Haris Sohail (114)
Most wickets	James Anderson (9)	Mohammad Abbas (10)
- Player of the series: Mohammad Abbas (Pak)

The Pakistan cricket team toured England between April and June 2018 to play two Test matches. Ahead of the Tests, Pakistan played first-class matches against Kent and Northamptonshire. They then travelled to Dublin to play Ireland in their first Test match, before playing a two-day match against Leicestershire ahead of the first Test against England. At the end of the tour they played two Twenty20 Internationals (T20Is) against Scotland in Edinburgh. The Test series was drawn 1–1.

== Squads ==
England	Pakistan
Joe Root (c); James Anderson; Jonny Bairstow (wk); Dom Bess; Stuart Broad; Jos Buttler; Alastair Cook; Sam Curran; Keaton Jennings; Dawid Malan; Ben Stokes; Mark Stoneman; Chris Woakes; Mark Wood	Sarfaraz Ahmed (c, wk); Asad Shafiq; Azhar Ali; Babar Azam; Faheem Ashraf; Fakhar Zaman; Haris Sohail; Hasan Ali; Imam-ul-Haq; Mohammad Abbas; Mohammad Amir; Rahat Ali; Saad Ali; Sami Aslam; Shadab Khan; Usman Salahuddin

In April 2018, Pakistani leg-spin bowler Yasir Shah was ruled out for ten weeks, due to stress fracture of a hip, causing him to miss the entire tour. Yasir reportedly needed to "undergo extensive rehabilitation". The Pakistan selectors were said to be considering either leg spinner Shadab Khan (who was chosen) or left-arm spinner Kashif Bhatti as replacement.

Babar Azam of Pakistan was ruled out of the remainder of the Test series after fracturing his forearm when he was hit by a delivery from Ben Stokes on the second day of the first Test. For the second Test, Keaton Jennings was added to England's squad, with Mark Stoneman being dropped. Sam Curran was also added to England's squad for the second Test, as cover for Ben Stokes, who suffered a hamstring injury.

== Tour matches ==
=== First-class: Kent vs Pakistan ===
28 April–1 May 2018
Scorecard

Pakistan	v	Kent
168 (55.2 overs); Imam-ul-Haq 61 (111); Will Gidman 5/47 (15 overs)		209/4 (64 overs); Joe Denly 113* (186); Shadab Khan 2/88 (18 overs)

Match drawn
St Lawrence Ground, Canterbury
Umpires: Jeremy Lloyds (Eng) and Steve O'Shaughnessy (Eng)

- Pakistan won the toss and elected to bat.
- No play was possible on days 2 and 3 due to rain. No play was possible on day 4 before lunch, also due to rain.

=== First-class: Northamptonshire vs Pakistan ===
4–7 May 2018
Scorecard

Northamptonshire	v	Pakistan
259 (73.4 overs); Adam Rossington 90 (135); Shadab Khan 6/77 (19 overs)		428 (116.3 overs); Asad Shafiq 186* (281); Steven Crook 4/89 (26 overs)
301 (95.5 overs); Rob Newton 118 (225); Mohammad Abbas 4/62 (18 overs)		134/1 (27 overs); Imam-ul-Haq 59* (81)

Pakistan won by 9 wickets
County Cricket Ground, Northampton
Umpires: Ian Ramage (Sco) and Martin Saggers (Eng)

- Northamptonshire won the toss and elected to bat.

=== Two-day match: Leicestershire vs Pakistan ===
19–20 May 2018
Scorecard

Pakistan	v	Leicestershire
321/9d (89.5 overs); Azhar Ali 73 (127); Aadil Ali 2/28 (5.5 overs)		226/6 (75 overs); Ateeq Javid 54 (115); Shadab Khan 2/32 (13 overs)

Match drawn
Grace Road, Leicester
Umpires: Peter Hartley (Eng) and Chris Watts (Eng)

- Pakistan won the toss and elected to bat.

== Test series ==
=== 1st Test ===
24–28 May 2018 (Note: While five days of play were scheduled for each Test, the first Test reached a result within four days, and the second Test reached a result within three days.)
Scorecard

England	v	Pakistan
184 (58.2 overs); Alastair Cook 70 (148); Mohammad Abbas 4/23 (14 overs)		363 (114.3 overs); Babar Azam 68* (120); Ben Stokes 3/73 (22 overs)
242 (82.1 overs); Joe Root 68 (120); Mohammad Amir 4/36 (18.1 overs)		66/1 (12.4 overs); Haris Sohail 39* (32); James Anderson 1/12 (3 overs)

Pakistan won by 9 wickets
Lord's, London
Umpires: Paul Reiffel (Aus) and Rod Tucker (Aus)
Player of the match: Mohammad Abbas (Pak)

- England won the toss and elected to bat.
- Dom Bess (Eng) made his Test debut.
- Alastair Cook (Eng) equalled Allan Border's record of playing in 153 consecutive Tests.
- This was the first time since 1995 that England had lost their opening home Test of the summer.

=== 2nd Test ===
1–5 June 2018
Scorecard

Pakistan	v	England
174 (48.1 overs); Shadab Khan 56 (52); Stuart Broad 3/38 (15 overs)		363 (106.2 overs); Jos Buttler 80* (101); Faheem Ashraf 3/60 (20 overs)
134 (46 overs); Imam-ul-Haq 34 (64); Stuart Broad 3/28 (12 overs)

England won by an innings and 55 runs
Headingley, Leeds
Umpires: Bruce Oxenford (Aus) and Rod Tucker (Aus)
Player of the match: Jos Buttler (Eng)

- Pakistan won the toss and elected to bat.
- No play was possible before 14:45 on day 2 due to rain.
- Sam Curran (Eng) and Usman Salahuddin (Pak) both made their Test debuts.
- Alastair Cook (Eng) set a new record of playing in the most consecutive Tests (154).
