= Mubeen Hameed =

Pakistani cricketer (born 1995)

Personal information
- Born: 13 December 1995 (age 30)
- Source: Cricinfo, 17 October 2017

Mubeen Hameed (born 13 December 1995) is a Pakistani cricketer. He made his first-class debut for Lahore Blues in the 2017–18 Quaid-e-Azam Trophy on 15 October 2017.
