= Maqsood Aziz =

Pakistani cricketer (born 1993)

Personal information
- Born: 20 December 1993 (age 32)
- Source: Cricinfo, 4 November 2017

Maqsood Aziz (born 20 December 1993) is a Pakistani cricketer. He made his first-class debut for National Bank of Pakistan in the 2017–18 Quaid-e-Azam Trophy on 2 November 2017.
