= Iqbal Sheikh (cricketer, born 1973) =

Pakistani cricketer (born 1973)

Personal information
- Born: 15 January 1973 (age 53)
- Source: Cricinfo, 26 September 2017

Iqbal Sheikh (born 15 January 1973) is a Pakistani former cricketer. He played in seventeen first-class and nineteen List A matches between 1995 and 2004. He is now an umpire, and stood in the match between Islamabad and Sui Southern Gas Company in the 2017–18 Quaid-e-Azam Trophy on 26 September 2017. As of September 2025, he has officiated 76 first class , 65 List A and 50 Twenty20 matches as an umpire.
