= Pakistani cricket team in Ireland in 2018 =

International cricket tour

	Ireland	Pakistan
- Dates: 11 – 15 May 2018 (Note: Although the match was set to begin on 11 May, the first day was lost due to rain and play began on 12 May.)
Captains	William Porterfield	Sarfaraz Ahmed

Test series
- Result: Pakistan won the 1-match series 1–0
Most runs	Kevin O'Brien (158)	Faheem Ashraf (83)
Most wickets	Tim Murtagh (6)	Mohammad Abbas (9)

The Pakistan cricket team visited Ireland in May 2018 to play a Test match against the Ireland cricket team. It was the first Test match played by the Ireland men's team since they were awarded Test status by the International Cricket Council (ICC) in June 2017. The Ireland women's cricket team had previously played a Women's Test match, also against Pakistan, in July 2000.

Pakistan won the one-off fixture by five wickets, with Ireland's Kevin O'Brien named as the man of the match, after he scored the first century for Ireland in Test cricket. Despite the loss, Cricket Ireland deemed the match to be a great success. Pakistan's captain, Sarfaraz Ahmed, praised the performance of the Ireland team during the match.

== Background ==
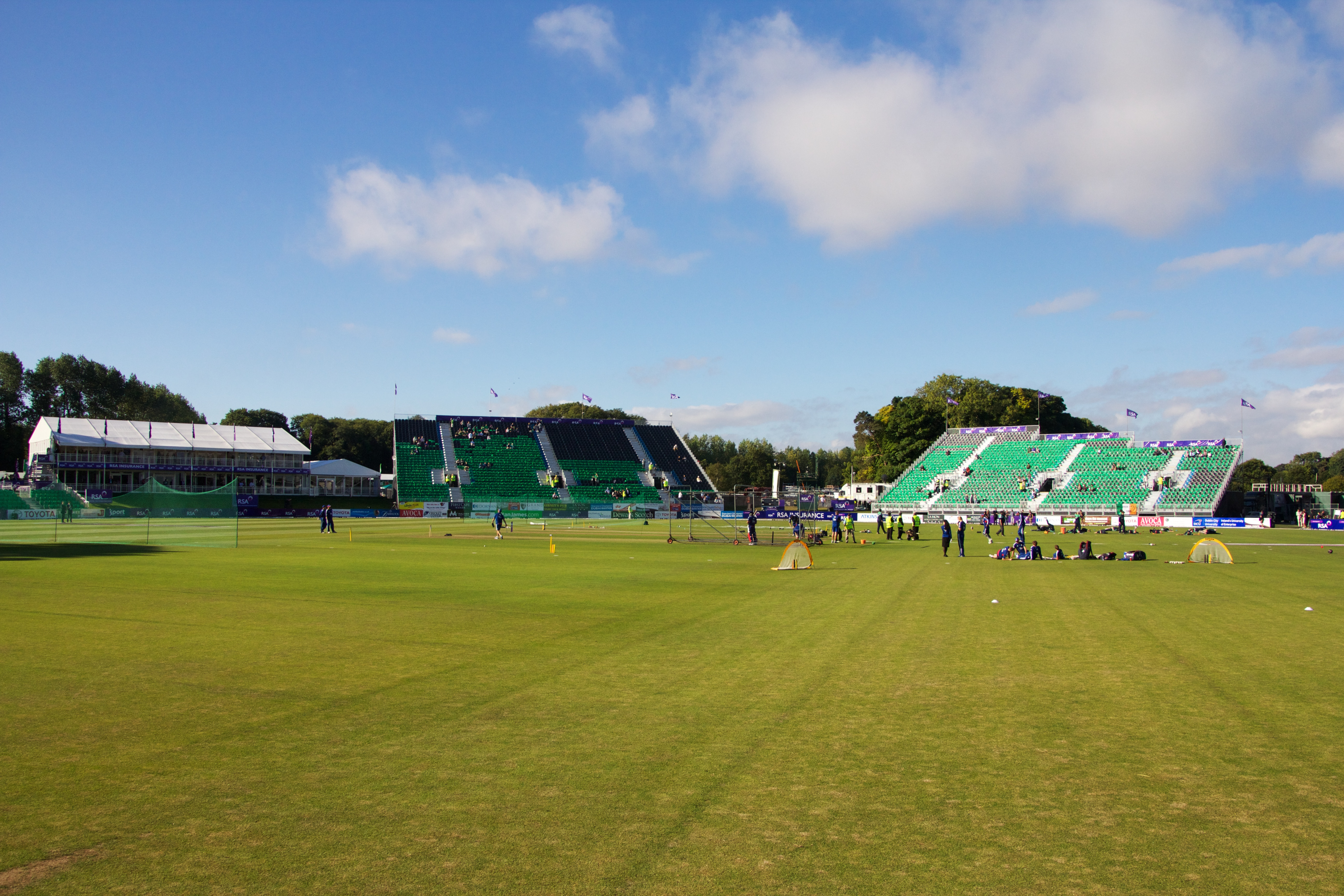
The Village, Malahide (pictured here in 2013), was chosen as the venue for Ireland's first Test match.

In July 2000, the Ireland and Pakistan women's teams faced each other in a Women's Test match at College Park, Dublin. Ireland women won the match by an innings and 54 runs, with Isobel Joyce named as the player of the match. It was the first Test match played by the Ireland women's cricket team.

On 22 June 2017, at the ICC's annual conference, the Ireland and Afghanistan men's teams were awarded Test status, becoming Full Members of the ICC in the process. The ICC confirmed that a single Test match would be played between Ireland and Pakistan during their meeting in Auckland in October 2017. Cricket Ireland confirmed the date of the Test match at their board meeting in October 2017, with The Village, Malahide, announced as the venue the following month. The match took place ahead of Pakistan's Test series against England and their T20I series against Scotland.

The ICC appointed three English officials for the match. Richard Illingworth and Nigel Llong were the on-field umpires, with Chris Broad named as the match referee. The Decision Review System (DRS) was not used for the Test match, as Cricket Ireland decided they could not afford the cost of using the system.

Warren Deutrom, CEO of Cricket Ireland, said that he was "delighted" that Ireland's debut Test match will be played at home and thanked the Pakistan Cricket Board (PCB) in being Ireland's first Test opponent. Cricket Ireland's director of high performance, Richard Holdsworth, said that Ireland would like to play a return fixture in Pakistan, as long as the security situation in the country remains stable. Deutrom later confirmed that they were considering the PCB's request to tour Pakistan at a later date.

Pakistan's last international fixtures before the Test match was a three-match Twenty20 International (T20I) series against the West Indies in Karachi in April 2018. Pakistan won the series 3–0. Pakistan's last Test match fixtures were against Sri Lanka, in the United Arab Emirates, in September and October 2017. Sri Lanka won both matches. Ireland had played in the 2018 Cricket World Cup Qualifier in Zimbabwe in March 2018. They finished the tournament in fifth place, from the ten teams that took part, failing to qualify for the 2019 Cricket World Cup.

Ahead of the Test match, Ireland's captain, William Porterfield, said that he was hoping local conditions would help his side, adding that subcontinental teams take some time to adjust. Pakistan's captain, Sarfaraz Ahmed, said that the team was really looking forward to playing against Ireland and was confident his young side would perform well in difficult conditions. Sarfraz later went on to say that "it is a big honour for me and my team to play this historic Test match" and that the team was ready to play. At a press conference the day before the match, Porterfield said that "a lot of people have devoted a lot of their lives to make this happen" and that "it is going to be a pretty special occasion".

== Squads ==
Ireland	Pakistan
William Porterfield (c); Andrew Balbirnie; Ed Joyce; Tyrone Kane; Andy McBrine; Tim Murtagh; Kevin O'Brien; Niall O'Brien (wk); Boyd Rankin; ~~Nathan Smith~~ †; Paul Stirling; James Shannon; Stuart Thompson; Gary Wilson (wk); Craig Young; † Ruled out through injury	Sarfaraz Ahmed (c, wk); Asad Shafiq; Azhar Ali; Babar Azam; Faheem Ashraf; Fakhar Zaman; Haris Sohail; Hasan Ali; Imam-ul-Haq; Mohammad Abbas; Mohammad Amir; Rahat Ali; Saad Ali; Sami Aslam; Shadab Khan; Usman Salahuddin

In April 2018, Pakistani leg-spin bowler Yasir Shah was ruled out for ten weeks, due to stress fracture of a hip, causing him to miss the match. The report said that Yasir would need to "undergo extensive rehabilitation". The Pakistan selectors were reportedly considering either leg spinner Shadab Khan (who was chosen) or left-arm spinner Kashif Bhatti as his replacement.

Later that month, following a five-day training camp at the Gaddafi Stadium in Lahore, the PCB named a sixteen-man squad for the tour to the United Kingdom and Ireland, including five uncapped players at Test level. In the same month, Cricket Ireland named twenty-six players who took part in two warm-up fixtures ahead of the final selection for the Test match. Seventeen of Ireland's international players also took part in the opening fixture of the 2018 Inter-Provincial Championship, which started on 1 May 2018.

On 4 May 2018, Cricket Ireland announced the squad for the match, with William Porterfield captaining the team. Of the fourteen players named in Ireland's squad, Boyd Rankin had previously played in one Test for England, in the 2013–14 Ashes series. Ed Joyce had also previously played for England, featuring in seventeen One Day Internationals (ODIs) between 2006 and 2007.

Two days before the Test, Nathan Smith suffered an injury and was ruled out of Ireland's squad. He was replaced by Craig Young. Prior to travelling to Ireland, Pakistan played two first-class cricket matches in England, against Kent and Northamptonshire. On the day before the Test, Sarfaraz Ahmed confirmed that the eleven that played against Northamptonshire would be the same side to play against Ireland. Therefore, Imam-ul-Haq and Faheem Ashraf both made their Test debuts.

After making his debut for Ireland, Ed Joyce joined his sister Isobel in becoming only the second brother and sister to have played in Test cricket, following Denise Emerson and Terry Alderman of Australia. Ed and Isobel Joyce are also the only brother and sister to have made their Test debuts when playing for their respective gender teams on their country's first ever Test appearances.

== Only Test ==
11–15 May 2018
Scorecard

Pakistan	v	Ireland
310/9d (96 overs); Faheem Ashraf 83 (115); Tim Murtagh 4/45 (25 overs)		130 (47.2 overs); Kevin O'Brien 40 (68); Mohammad Abbas 4/44 (11 overs)
160/5 (45 overs); Imam-ul-Haq 74* (121); Tim Murtagh 2/55 (16 overs)		339 (129.3 overs) (f/o); Kevin O'Brien 118 (217); Mohammad Abbas 5/66 (28.3 overs)

Pakistan won by 5 wickets
The Village, Dublin
Umpires: Richard Illingworth (Eng) and Nigel Llong (Eng)
Player of the match: Kevin O'Brien (Ire)

- Ireland won the toss and elected to field.
- No play was possible on day 1 due to rain.
- 22 overs of play were lost at the end of day 2 due to bad light and rain.
- Andrew Balbirnie, Ed Joyce, Tyrone Kane, Tim Murtagh, Kevin O'Brien, Niall O'Brien, William Porterfield, Paul Stirling, Stuart Thompson, Gary Wilson (Ire), Faheem Ashraf and Imam-ul-Haq (Pak) all made their Test debuts.

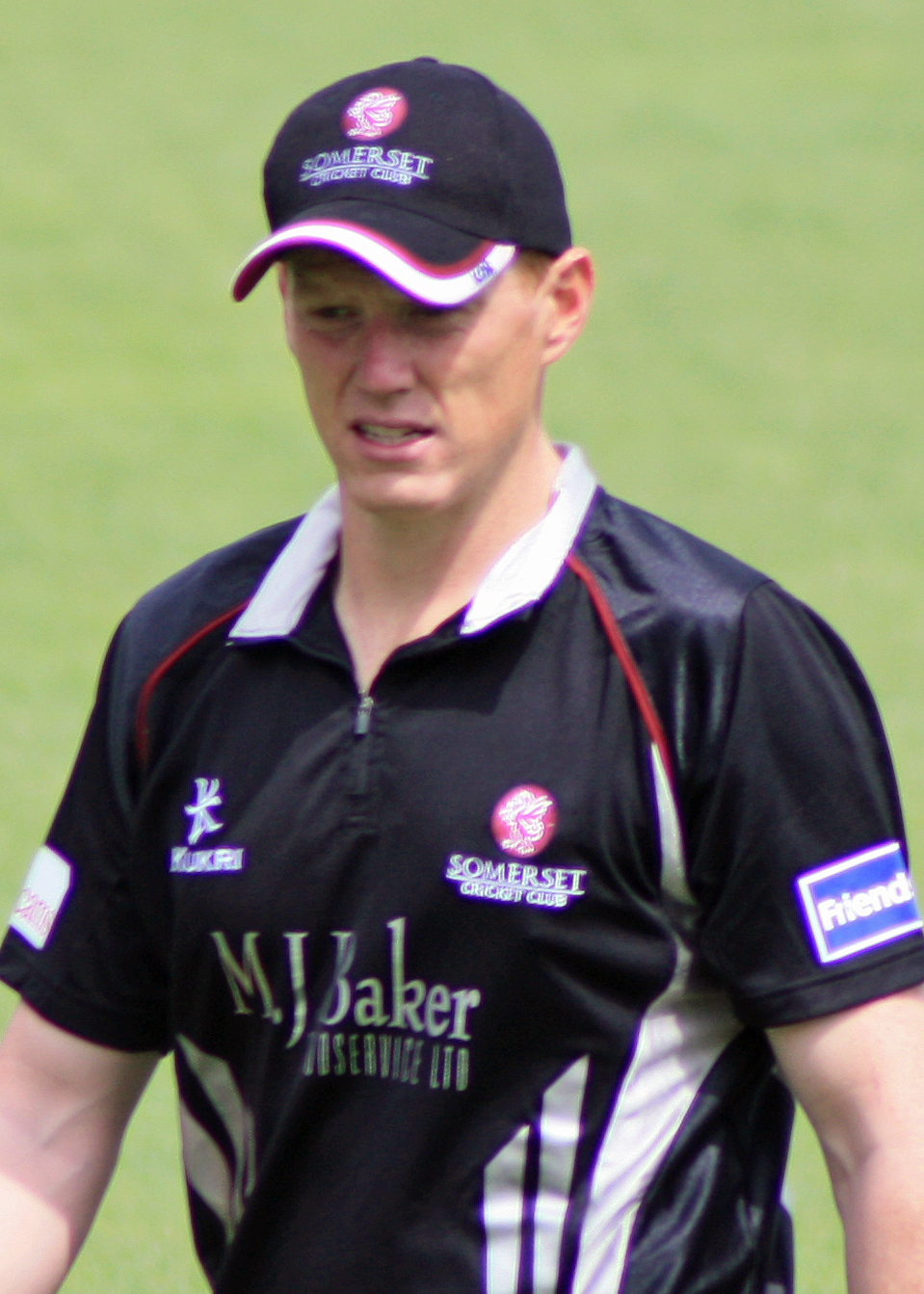
Kevin O'Brien (pictured in 2012) scored the first century for Ireland in Tests and was named the man of the match.

No play was possible on the first day due to rain, therefore Ireland became the first side to have the opening day of their maiden Test washed out. As a result of no play on the first day, Cricket Ireland lost €75,000 in ticket refunds. Play finally got underway on the second day, with Ireland winning the toss and electing to field. Tim Murtagh became the first bowler for Ireland to bowl a ball in Test cricket. Boyd Rankin took Ireland's first wicket in Tests, dismissing Pakistan's Azhar Ali, who was caught by William Porterfield at second slip. Rankin became the first player since Kepler Wessels in 1994, and fifteenth cricketer overall, to play Test cricket for two different national teams. Kevin O'Brien became the first sportsperson from Ireland to appear in 300 matches for his country. Reflecting on the day, Ireland's wicket-keeper, Gary Wilson, said that Pakistan "got away from us a little at the end" but added that it was a very proud moment for everyone to be presented with their first Test cap.

Pakistan declared their first innings before lunch on day three, after scoring 310 runs for the loss of nine wickets. Faheem Ashraf top-scored for Pakistan, with 83 runs, including the fastest Test fifty on debut by a batsman for Pakistan, from 52 balls. Ed Joyce faced the first delivery and scored the first run for Ireland in Test cricket. He also became the first batsman to be dismissed for Ireland, when he was out lbw, bowled by Mohammad Abbas. Ireland were eventually all out for 130 runs, with Kevin O'Brien top-scoring with 40, and Mohammad Abbas finishing with four wickets for 44 runs. For the first time in sixteen years, when New Zealand played in Lahore in 2002, Pakistan enforced the follow-on. (Note: Per the Laws of Cricket, the follow-on is set at a lead of 200 runs in a five-day match, with it reduced to 150 runs in a three- or four-day match. Therefore, with no play on the first day, Ireland needed 161 runs to avoid the follow-on.) Ireland finished day three on 64 without losing a wicket, trailing by 116 runs, with Ed Joyce on 39 not out. After the close of play, Joyce said that "it was a tough wicket, but it has flattened out a little bit", adding that "the first session tomorrow is going to be really important".

In the first session of day four, Andrew Balbirnie was dismissed for a pair, therefore becoming the 44th batsman, and first for Ireland, to get a pair on debut in Test cricket. In the second session, Mohammad Amir took his 100th Test wicket, becoming the second left-arm fast bowler for Pakistan to reach the milestone. At the tea interval, Ireland had a lead of 32 runs, with Kevin O'Brien scoring the first fifty in Tests for Ireland. In the final session of day four, O'Brien went on to score his maiden century, and the first for Ireland. He became the 105th batsman to do so on debut in Tests, and the fourth to score a century in their country's maiden Test. Ireland finished the day seven wickets down, with a lead of 139 runs, and O'Brien unbeaten on 118. Afterwards, O'Brien said that it was a "very proud and emotional" moment to score a Test century, and ranked it second on his own personal list, behind the century he scored in the 2011 Cricket World Cup against England in Bangalore. Pakistan's opening batsman, Azhar Ali, said that "the partnership between Thompson and Kevin took the game away from us" and gave credit to the Ireland players and how they batted.

At the start of the fifth and final day, O'Brien did not add to his overnight score, being dismissed for the first ball he faced. Mohammad Abbas took the remaining two wickets, to take his second five-wicket haul in Tests, in his sixth match. With Ireland bowled out for 339, that set Pakistan a target of 160 runs to win. Pakistan won the match by five wickets, in the penultimate session of the match, with an unbeaten fifty by debutant Imam-ul-Haq and a fifty from Babar Azam. Ireland's Kevin O'Brien won the man of the match award for his batting performance. As a result, O'Brien broke into the top 100 in the ICC Player Rankings for Test batsmen, at position 66. Ireland's Tim Murtagh and Stuart Thompson were ranked 67th and 76th respectively in the Test bowling rankings.

=== Reactions ===
After the match, Pakistan's captain, Sarfaraz Ahmed, said that victory was very important and that the team was very confident in scoring the runs. He added that they were a very young side, but could chase the runs needed to win. He also praised the opposition's performance, saying "the way they bowled, the way they batted, it’s not easy to play Ireland". Ireland's captain, William Porterfield, said that despite losing he was extremely proud of how the team played, saying "it was a hell of an effort". He praised Kevin O'Brien's performance and added it was an all-round team effort. On Ireland's future in Test cricket, he added that he is "very confident in the next generation" and that there will be "hundreds of kids aspiring to be Kevin O'Brien". O'Brien said that he was very proud of his century, but was also disappointed that the team did not put Pakistan under more pressure.

Warren Deutrom, CEO of Cricket Ireland, said "this was a great success" and that "there were three things we were hoping for from this match; good crowds, good weather and competitive cricket". Deutrom also commented on forthcoming fixtures for Ireland across the next four to five years in the Future Tours Programme (FTP), and improvements to facilities to prepare for these matches. Deutrom anticipates that Ireland will play one or two Tests a year, once the final fixtures in the FTP are agreed. Talking about the match, he said that despite the first day being washed out, Ireland were "extremely competitive" and he was "delighted" that they got to the final day still with a chance to win the match.
