= Saad Ali =

Pakistani cricketer

Personal information
- Full name: Syed Saad Ali
- Born: 5 October 1993 (age 33); Karachi, Sindh, Pakistan
- Batting: Left-handed
- Bowling: Right-arm Medium
- Role: Batsman

International information
- National side: Pakistan (2019)
- ODI debut (cap 224): 29 March 2019 v Australia
- Last ODI: 31 March 2019 v Australia

Domestic team information
- Years: Team
- 2017: Islamabad
- 2017/18: United Bank Limited
- 2018: Quetta Gladiators
- 2019: Lahore Qalandars
- 2019/20: Sindh

Career statistics
Competition	FC	LA	T20
Matches	68	64	13
Runs scored	4,377	1,919	333
Batting average	45.12	46.80	30.27
100s/50s	11/22	1/14	0/2
Top score	232	102*	57*
Balls bowled	469	30	–
Wickets	3	1	–
Bowling average	100.00	19.00	–
5 wickets in innings	0	0	–
10 wickets in match	0	0	–
Best bowling	1/1	1/9	–
Catches/stumpings	63/–	17/-	4/-
- Source: Cricinfo, 16 January 2021

Syed Saad Ali (born 5 October 1993) is a Pakistani-born cricketer who played for the Pakistan national cricket team in 2019 before retiring in 2023 to join Major League Cricket.

== Domestic career ==
He made his Twenty20 debut for Islamabad in the 2017–18 National T20 Cup on 12 November 2017. In November 2017, he was selected to play for the Quetta Gladiators in 2018 Pakistan Super League players draft.

He was the leading run-scorer in the 2017–18 Quaid-e-Azam Trophy, with a total of 957 runs in ten matches, more than 200 runs ahead of the next leading batsman in the tournament. He was also the leading run-scorer for Karachi Whites in the 2018–19 Quaid-e-Azam One Day Cup, with 243 runs in five matches. He was also the leading run-scorer for Peshawar in the 2018–19 National T20 Cup, with 183 runs in four matches.

In March 2019, he was named in Punjab's squad for the 2019 Pakistan Cup. In September 2019, he was named in Sindh's squad for the 2019–20 Quaid-e-Azam Trophy tournament. In March 2021, Saad was signed by Longton Cricket Club to play in the North Staffordshire and South Cheshire League during the summer of 2021 in England.

== International career ==
In April 2018, he was named in Pakistan's Test squad for their tours to Ireland and England in May 2018, but he did not play. In August 2018, he was one of thirty-three players to be awarded a central contract for the 2018–19 season by the Pakistan Cricket Board (PCB).

In November 2018, he was again named in Pakistan's Test squad, this time for their series against New Zealand. In December 2018, he was named in Pakistan's team for the 2018 ACC Emerging Teams Asia Cup.

In March 2019, he was named in Pakistan's One Day International (ODI) squad for their series against Australia. He made his ODI debut for Pakistan against Australia on 29 March 2019.
