= Mohammad Zahid (Faisalabad cricketer) =

Pakistani cricketer (born 1982)

Personal information
- Born: 25 April 1982 (age 44); Faisalabad, Pakistan
- Batting: Right-handed
- Bowling: Right-arm Offbreak
- Source: Cricinfo, 11 November 2015

Mohammad Zahid (born 25 April 1982) is a Pakistani first-class cricketer who played for Faisalabad cricket team.
