= Aziz-ur-Rehman (cricketer, born 1959) =

Pakistani cricketer (born 1959)

Personal information
- Born: 25 July 1959 (age 67)
- Source: ESPNcricinfo, 3 October 2017

Aziz-ur-Rehman Malik (born 25 July 1959) is a Pakistani former cricketer. He played in five first-class matches between 1983 and 1986. He is now an umpire, and stood in the match between Lahore Blues and National Bank of Pakistan in the 2017–18 Quaid-e-Azam Trophy on 3 October 2017.

In February 2020, he was named in Pakistan's squad for the Over-50s Cricket World Cup in South Africa. However, the tournament was cancelled during the third round of matches due to the COVID-19 pandemic.
