= Iftikhar Ahmed (Faisalabad cricketer) =

Pakistani cricketer (born 1984)

Personal information
- Born: 14 December 1984 (age 41); Kanganpur, Punjab, Pakistan
- Batting: Right-handed
- Role: Batsman

Domestic team information
- Years: Team
- 2014–17: Faisalabad

Career statistics
Competition	FC	LA
Matches	9	3
Runs scored	303	122
Batting average	17.82	40.66
100s/50s	–/1	–/1
Top score	52	88
Catches/stumpings	3/–	1/–
- Source: PCB, 20 March 2021

Iftikhar Ahmed (born 14 December 1984) is a Pakistani cricketer who played for Faisalabad.

Having played for Kasur in inter-district cricket for several seasons, Ahmed made his first-class debut for Faisalabad in the 2014–15 Quaid-e-Azam Trophy Silver League, playing in four of the team's six matches in the competition. He also played in three List A matches in the President's Silver Cup One Day. After Faisalabad failed to qualify for first-class cricket the following season, he continued to play for the team in the Quaid-e-Azam Trophy Grade‑II competition. He did not play in 2016–17 as Faisalabad won the Quaid-e-Azam Trophy Grade‑II to gain promotion, however he returned the following season to play in five of Faisalabad's seven matches in the 2017–18 Quaid-e-Azam Trophy.
