= Nazar Hussain =

Pakistani cricketer (born 1988)

Personal information
- Born: 24 August 1988 (age 37); Pishin, Balochistan, Pakistan
- Batting: Left-handed
- Bowling: Left-arm fast-medium
- Role: Bowler

Domestic team information
- Years: Team
- 2010–2014: State Bank of Pakistan
- 2007–2015: Quetta
- 2016–2018: Rawalpindi
- Source: Cricinfo, 14 November 2015

Nazar Hussain (born 24 August 1988) is a Pakistani cricketer who plays for the Balochistan cricket team. He was the leading wicket-taker for Rawalpindi in the 2017–18 Quaid-e-Azam Trophy, with 35 dismissals in seven matches.

In January 2021, he was named in Balochistan's squad for the 2020–21 Pakistan Cup.
