= Asif Ali (cricketer) =

Pakistani cricketer

Personal information
- Born: 1 October 1991 (age 35); Faisalabad, Punjab, Pakistan
- Nickname: Laparu
- Height: 5 ft 7 in (170 cm)
- Batting: Right-handed
- Bowling: Right-arm off break
- Role: Middle-order batter

International information
- National side: Pakistan (2018–2023)
- ODI debut (cap 217): 13 July 2018 v Zimbabwe
- Last ODI: 2 April 2022 v Australia
- T20I debut (cap 76): 1 April 2018 v West Indies
- Last T20I: 7 October 2023 v Bangladesh

Domestic team information
- Years: Team
- 2010/11–2017/18: Faisalabad
- 2013: United Bank Limited
- 2014: Punjab
- 2016–2023: Islamabad United (squad no. 13)
- 2016/17–2018/19: Rawalpindi
- 2016/17–2018/19: Sui Northern Gas
- 2018–2019: Cape Town Blitz
- 2018/19: Islamabad
- 2018/19: Sindh
- 2019/20–2021/22: Northern
- 2019/20: Dhaka Platoon
- 2020: Jamaica Tallawahs
- 2021: St Kitts & Nevis Patriots
- 2022/23: Hobart Hurricanes
- 2024: Peshawar Zalmi
- 2025: Lahore Qalandars

Career statistics
Competition	ODI	T20I	LA	T20
Matches	21	58	99	294
Runs scored	382	577	2,388	4,700
Batting average	25.46	15.18	28.42	22.27
100s/50s	0/3	0/0	4/13	1/15
Top score	52	41*	138	100
Balls bowled	5	–	70	42
Wickets	0	–	3	4
Bowling average	–	–	30.66	13.25
5 wickets in innings	0	–	0	0
10 wickets in match	0	–	0	0
Best bowling	–	–	2/10	2/27
Catches/stumpings	6/–	21/–	44/–	118/–
- Source: ESPNCricinfo, 25 April 2025

Asif Ali (born 1 October 1991) is a Pakistani former cricketer who played for the Pakistan national cricket team. In first-class cricket, he represented Northern, and also played for the Lahore Qalandars in the Pakistan Super League.

He was among thirty-three players awarded a central contract for the 2018–19 season by the Pakistan Cricket Board (PCB).

Ali announced his retirement from international cricket on 1 September 2025.

== Early life ==
Asif was born on 1 October 1991, in Faisalabad, Pakistan

Before going into professional cricket, he used to work as a labourer in an iron foundry.

== Domestic and T20 franchise career ==
Misbah-ul-Haq has played an instrumental role in his development as a cricketer and initially picked him as a power-hitter in the 2011 Super 8 Twenty20 Cup when he was a captain of the Faisalabad cricket team.

He was the leading run-scorer for Faisalabad in the 2017–18 Quaid-e-Azam Trophy, with 369 runs in six matches. He also played in the 2017 Everest Premier league for Pokhara Rhinos.

In April 2018, he was named in Punjab's squad for the 2018 Pakistan Cup. He scored the most runs for Punjab during the tournament, with 328 runs in four matches.

On 3 June 2018, he was selected to play for the Edmonton Royals in the players' draft for the inaugural edition of the Global T20 Canada tournament. In October 2018, he was named in Cape Town Blitz's squad for the first edition of the Mzansi Super League T20 tournament.

In March 2019, he was named in Sindh's squad for the 2019 Pakistan Cup. In September 2019, he was named in the squad for the Cape Town Blitz team for the 2019 Mzansi Super League tournament.

In September 2019, he was named in Northern's squad for the 2019–20 Quaid-e-Azam Trophy tournament. In November 2019, he was selected to play for the Dhaka Platoon in the 2019–20 Bangladesh Premier League.

In July 2020, he was named in the Jamaica Tallawahs squad for the 2020 Caribbean Premier League. In October 2020, he was drafted by the Jaffna Stallions for the inaugural edition of the Lanka Premier League. In January 2021, he was named in Northern's squad for the 2020–21 Pakistan Cup.

He was picked by St Kitts & Nevis Patriots for CPL 2021. In December 2021, he was signed by Islamabad United following the players' draft for the 2022 Pakistan Super League. In July 2022, he was signed by the Colombo Stars for the third edition of the Lanka Premier League.

In August 2022, he was signed by the Hobart Hurricanes for BBL 12.

== International career ==
In Mar 2018, he was named in Pakistan's Twenty20 International (T20I) squad for their series against the West Indies. He made his T20I debut for Pakistan against the West Indies on 1 April 2018. He made his ODI debut for Pakistan against Zimbabwe on 13 July 2018.

In May 2019, he was named in Pakistan's squad for the 2019 Cricket World Cup, after the Pakistan Cricket Board (PCB) named their final fifteen-man squad for the tournament. Ali struggled to make an impact in the first three years of his international career, and was often sidelined from the team.

=== 2021 ICC T20 World Cup ===
In September 2021, he was named in Pakistan's squad for the 2021 ICC Men's T20 World Cup. His selection was criticized by many people including ex-cricketers but he proved his selection right by scoring crucial runs against New Zealand and Afghanistan. He won the man of the match award for scoring unbeaten 25 off 7 balls against Afghanistan.

Asif Ali won the Player of the Month award in November 2021 for his match-winning performances for Pakistan during the T20 World Cup.

=== Asia Cup 2022 ===
He was named in the Pakistan's squad for the Asia Cup 2022. On September 8, 2022, he was fined 25% of match fees for breaching Level 1 of the ICC Code of Conduct during the match against Afghanistan after he got involved in a heated exchange with Afghanistan's bowler Fareed Ahmad.
