= Faraz Ali =

Pakistani cricketer (born 1993)

Personal information
- Full name: Faraz Ali
- Born: 25 April 1993 (age 33); Karachi, Sindh, Pakistan
- Source: Cricinfo, 24 November 2015

Faraz Ali (born 25 April 1993) is a Pakistani first-class cricketer who plays for Pakistan International Airlines.
