= Irfan Zaman =

Pakistani cricketer (born 1991)

Personal information
- Born: 11 November 1991 (age 35)
- Batting: Right-handed
- Bowling: Right-arm offbreak
- Source: Cricinfo, 10 October 2017

Irfan Zaman (born 11 November 1991) is a Pakistani cricketer. He made his first-class debut for Lahore Ravi in the 2008–09 Quaid-e-Azam Trophy on 25 February 2009.
