= Salman Fayyaz =

Pakistani cricketer (born 1997)

Personal information
- Born: 11 August 1997 (age 29); Bahawalpur, Punjab, Pakistan
- Role: Bowler

Domestic team information
- Years: Team
- 2024-present: Lahore Qalandars (squad no. 379)
- Source: Cricinfo, 26 September 2017

Salman Fayyaz (born 11 August 1997) is a Pakistani cricketer. He made his first-class debut for Lahore Whites against Pakistan Television in the 2017–18 Quaid-e-Azam Trophy on 26 September 2017. Prior to his first-class debut, he was named in Pakistan's squad for the 2016 Under-19 Cricket World Cup.
