= Israr-ul-Haq =

Pakistani cricketer (born 1994)

Personal information
- Full name: Israr-ul-Haq
- Born: 23 November 1994 (age 31)
- Source: Cricinfo, 10 October 2017

Israr-ul-Haq (born 23 November 1994) is a Pakistani cricketer. He made his first-class debut for Habib Bank Limited in the 2017–18 Quaid-e-Azam Trophy on 9 October 2017. He made his List A debut for Habib Bank Limited in the 2017–18 Departmental One Day Cup on 1 January 2018.
