= Rizwan Hussain (cricketer) =

Pakistani cricketer

Personal information
- Born: 26 April 1996 (age 30); Pir Mahal, Punjab, Pakistan
- Nickname: Cheetah
- Height: 6 ft 1 in (185 cm)
- Batting: Left-handed
- Role: Batsman

Domestic team information
- Years: Team
- 2016/17–2018/19: Lahore Whites
- 2019–2020: Islamabad United
- 2018: Balochistan
- 2019/20–present: Central Punjab
- Source: Cricinfo, 1 February 2022

Rizwan Hussain (born 26 April 1996) is a Pakistani cricketer. He made his first-class debut for Lahore Whites in the 2016–17 Quaid-e-Azam Trophy on 22 October 2016. He was the leading run-scorer for Lahore Whites in the 2017–18 Quaid-e-Azam Trophy, with 497 runs in eight matches.

In April 2018, he was named in Balochistan's squad for the 2018 Pakistan Cup. He made his Twenty20 debut for Lahore Blues in the 2018–19 National T20 Cup on 10 December 2018. He was the leading run-scorer for Lahore Blues in the tournament, with 311 runs in seven matches.

In September 2019, he was named in Central Punjab's squad for the 2019–20 Quaid-e-Azam Trophy tournament. In January 2021, he was named in Central Punjab's squad for the 2020–21 Pakistan Cup. He was part of the Islamabad United squad in the Pakistan Super League in 2019–2020.
