= Hamza Nadeem =

Pakistani cricketer (born 1986)

Personal information
- Born: 31 August 1986 (age 40); Rawalpindi, Pakistan
- Source: ESPNcricinfo, 29 October 2016

Hamza Nadeem (born 31 August 1986) is a Pakistani cricketer. He made his first-class debut for Islamabad in the 2012–13 Quaid-e-Azam Trophy on 20 January 2013.
