= Abdul Rehman Muzammil =

Pakistani cricketer (born 1989)

Personal information
- Born: 31 July 1989 (age 37)
- Source: ESPNcricinfo, 23 October 2016

Abdul Rehman Muzammil (born 31 July 1989) is a Pakistani cricketer. He made his first-class debut for Multan in the 2013–14 Quaid-e-Azam Trophy on 22 October 2016.

In April 2018, he was named in Punjab's squad for the 2018 Pakistan Cup. In September 2019, he was named in Southern Punjab's squad for the 2019–20 Quaid-e-Azam Trophy tournament.
