= Mohammad Saad =

Pakistani cricketer (born 1990)

Personal information
- Born: 24 March 1990 (age 36); Gujranwala, Punjab, Pakistan
- Batting: Right-handed
- Role: Batsman

Domestic team information
- Years: Team
- 2017/18–2018/19: Water and Power Development Authority
- 2018: Khyber Pakhtunkhwa
- 2019–present: Central Punjab
- Source: Cricinfo, 24 November 2015

Mohammad Saad (born 24 March 1990) is a Pakistani first-class cricketer who currently plays for Central Punjab. He was the leading run-scorer for Water and Power Development Authority in the 2017–18 Quaid-e-Azam Trophy, with 650 runs in eleven matches.

In April 2018, he was named in Khyber Pakhtunkhwa's squad for the 2018 Pakistan Cup. In March 2019, he was named in Khyber Pakhtunkhwa's squad for the 2019 Pakistan Cup. In September 2019, he was named in Central Punjab's squad for the 2019–20 Quaid-e-Azam Trophy tournament. In January 2021, he was named in Central Punjab's squad for the 2020–21 Pakistan Cup.

During the opening round of fixtures in the 2019–20 Quaid-e-Azam Trophy, Saad became the first concussion substitute ever used in a domestic cricket match in Pakistan. He replaced Usman Salahuddin in Central Punjab's team on the second day of the match between Southern Punjab and Central Punjab.
