= Muzammil Nizam =

Pakistani cricketer (born 1990)

Personal information
- Born: 29 October 1990 (age 36)
- Source: Cricinfo, 4 November 2017

Muzammil Nizam (born 29 October 1990) is a Pakistani cricketer. He made his first-class debut for Rawalpindi in the 2010–11 Quaid-e-Azam Trophy on 4 November 2010.
