= Hasnain Shah =

Pakistani cricketer (born 1992)

Personal information
- Born: 16 October 1992 (age 34)
- Source: Cricinfo, 26 September 2017

Hasnain Shah (born 16 October 1992) is a Pakistani cricketer. He made his first-class debut for Water and Power Development Authority in the 2017–18 Quaid-e-Azam Trophy on 26 September 2017. He made his List A debut for Water and Power Development Authority in the 2017–18 Departmental One Day Cup on 28 December 2017.
