= Waqas Saleem =

Pakistani cricketer (born 1985)

Personal information
- Born: 31 May 1985 (age 41); Lahore, Pakistan
- Source: Cricinfo, 24 November 2015

Waqas Saleem (born 31 May 1985) is a Pakistani first-class cricketer who plays for Lahore.
