= Salman Afridi =

Pakistani cricketer (born 1992)

Personal information
- Born: 3 August 1992 (age 34); Khyber Agency, Pakistan
- Source: ESPNcricinfo, 17 December 2016

Salman Afridi (born 3 August 1992) is a Pakistani cricketer. He made his List A debut for Sui Northern Gas Pipelines Limited in the 2016–17 Departmental One Day Cup on 17 December 2016. He made his first-class debut for Habib Bank Limited in the 2017–18 Quaid-e-Azam Trophy on 26 September 2017.
