= Junaid Ali =

Pakistani cricketer (born 1995)

Personal information
- Full name: Syed Junaid Ali
- Born: 6 December 1995 (age 30); Lahore, Pakistan
- Batting: Right-handed
- Role: Wicketkeeper
- Source: Cricinfo, 20 December 2015

Junaid Ali (born 6 December 1995) is a Pakistani first-class cricketer who plays for Central Punjab.
