= Farhan Khan (Lahore cricketer) =

Pakistani cricketer (born 1990)

Personal information
- Full name: Mohammad Farhan Khan
- Born: 10 October 1990 (age 36); Lahore, Pakistan

Domestic team information
- Years: Team
- 2023—present: Lahore Whites (squad no. 14)
- Source: ESPNcricinfo, 26 August 2016

Farhan Khan (born 10 October 1990) is a Pakistani cricketer who plays for Lahore. He made his Twenty20 debut on 25 August 2016 for Lahore Blues in the 2016–17 National T20 Cup.
