= Asad Raza (cricketer) =

Pakistani cricketer (born 1997)

Personal information
- Born: 25 December 1997 (age 28); Faisalabad, Punjab, Pakistan
- Source: Cricinfo, 25 April 2017

Asad Raza (born 25 December 1997) is a Pakistani cricketer.

== Career ==
During the Inter-Region U19 Tournament organized by the Pakistan Cricket Board in September 2016, a teen-aged Raza, representing Faisalabad, achieved the distinctive feat of taking all 10 wickets in a single innings and 14 wickets in the match, including a hat-trick in his first over. This performance was instrumental in Faisalabad's win against Hyderabad at the Niaz Stadium.

Raza made his List A debut for Khyber Pakhtunkhwa in the 2017 Pakistan Cup on 25 April 2017. He made his first-class debut for Faisalabad in the 2017–18 Quaid-e-Azam Trophy on 9 October 2017. He made his Twenty20 debut for Faisalabad in the 2017–18 National T20 Cup on 12 November 2017.
