= Aizaz Cheema =

Pakistani former cricketer

Personal information
- Full name: Aizaz Bin Ilyas Cheema
- Born: 5 September 1979 (age 47); Sargodha, Punjab, Pakistan
- Height: 6 ft (183 cm)
- Batting: Right-handed
- Bowling: Right-arm medium-fast
- Role: Bowler

International information
- National side: Pakistan (2011–2012)
- Test debut (cap 205): 1 September 2011 v Zimbabwe
- Last Test: 30 June 2012 v Sri Lanka
- ODI debut (cap 187): 8 September 2011 v Zimbabwe
- Last ODI: 28 August 2012 v Australia
- T20I debut (cap 42): 16 September 2011 v Australia
- Last T20I: 28 August 2012 v England

Domestic team information
- Years: Team
- 2001/02–2014/15: PIA
- 2003/04: Lahore
- 2004/05: Lahore Whites
- 2005/06–2015/16: Lahore Eagles
- 2005–2013: Lahore Shalimar
- 2009–2015: Lahore Lions
- 2015: Lahore Blues
- 2016–2017: Quetta Gladiators
- 2019: Lahore Qalandars
- 2019/20: Central Punjab

Career statistics
| Competition | Test | ODI | FC | LA |
|---|---|---|---|---|
| Matches | 7 | 14 | 140 | 60 |
| Runs scored | 1 | 26 | 2,449 | 105 |
| Batting average | – | 8.66 | 8.04 | 954 |
| 100s/50s | 0/0 | 0/0 | 0/0 | 0/0 |
| Top score | 1* | 9* | 33 | 13* |
| Balls bowled | 1,200 | 658 | 14,341 | 2,745 |
| Wickets | 20 | 23 | 572 | 90 |
| Bowling average | 31.90 | 25.78 | 21.48 | 27.21 |
| 5 wickets in innings | 0 | 0 | 38 | 2 |
| 10 wickets in match | 0 | 0 | 11 | 0 |
| Best bowling | 4/24 | 4/43 | 7/24 | 5/37 |
| Catches/stumpings | 1/– | 2/- | 18/– | 10/– |
Medal record
Representing Pakistan
Men's Cricket
Asian Games
| Bronze medal – third place | 2010 Guangzhou | Team |
- Source: ESPNCricinfo, 11 December 2013

Aizaz Bin Ilyas Cheema (Punjabi, Urdu: اعزاز چیمہ) (born 5 September 1979 in Sargodha, Punjab) is a Pakistani cricket coach and former cricketer who played in seven Test matches, scoring a single run without being dismissed in five innings.

== Cricket career ==
=== 2010 ===
In November, Cheema was part of the team at the Asian Games in Guangzhou, China that won a bronze medal by beating Sri Lanka in the 3rd place playoff.

=== International breakthrough ===
When Pakistan toured Zimbabwe in September for a Test three ODIs and two T20Is, the national selectors took the opportunity to give inexperienced players an opportunity. Frontline bowlers Wahab Riaz and Umar Gul were rested and Cheema was chosen as part of the squad. On 1 September he made his Test debut against Zimbabwe; Pakistan's fast bowlers in the match were inexperienced at international level, with just one Test cap between them. Pakistan won the match and coach Waqar Younis praised Cheema's performance, saying he "bowled with fire and aggression". His first wicket was that of bowler Ray Price. Cheema took eight wickets in the match for 103 runs, the second best bowling figures by a Pakistan player on Test debut. Pakistan won the subsequent ODI series 3–0; Cheema made his debut in the series and his figures of 3/36 were the joint fourth best by a Pakistan bowler in his first ODI. Cheema was the leading wicket-taker in the series with eight dismissals, with best figures of 4/43. His haul for the series was the second most for a Pakistan bowler in a three-match away series.

=== 2012 Asia Cup ===
In 2012 Asia Cup Aizaz saw his best days of international cricket. Cheema bowled the last over in the Final of the Asia Cup and successfully defended 9 runs that were required off the over. He also took the crucial wicket of Shakib al Hasan earlier in the match.

=== Domestic career ===
He was the leading wicket-taker in the 2017–18 Quaid-e-Azam Trophy, with a total of 60 wickets in nine matches. He was also the leading wicket-taker for Lahore Blues in the 2018–19 Quaid-e-Azam One Day Cup, with ten dismissals in seven matches. He was also the leading wicket-taker in the 2018–19 Quaid-e-Azam Trophy, with 59 wickets in ten matches.

== Coaching career ==
In 2005, he completed English Cricket Board's level 2 coaching qualification in England while in 2019 he completed Pakistan Cricket Board's level 2 coaching qualification as well.

In August 2021, he was appointed assistant coach to Central Punjab.

In September 2022, he was appointed bowling coach to the Gujranwala Giants squad for the inaugural season of the Pakistan Junior League.
