= Ahmed Safi Abdullah =

Pakistani cricketer (born 1998)

Personal information
- Born: 1 March 1998 (age 28); Faisalabad, Punjab, Pakistan

Domestic team information
- Years: Team
- 2020: Islamabad United
- Source: Cricinfo, 23 February 2020

Ahmed Safi Abdullah (born 1 March 1998) is a Pakistani cricketer who plays for Central Punjab. He was the leading wicket-taker for Faisalabad in the 2017–18 Quaid-e-Azam Trophy, with 18 dismissals in four matches. He made his Twenty20 debut on 23 February 2020, for Islamabad United in the 2020 Pakistan Super League. In January 2021, he was named in Central Punjab's squad for the 2020–21 Pakistan Cup. In October 2021, he was named in the 19-member Pakistan Shaheens squad for their tour of Sri Lanka.
