= Aamer Sajjad =

Pakistani cricketer

Personal information
- Born: 5 February 1981 (age 45); Lahore, Punjab, Pakistan
- Batting: Right-handed
- Bowling: Right-arm off-spin

Domestic team information
- Years: Team
- 2001–02 to 2004–05: Lahore Whites
- 2004–05 to 2015–16: Water and Power Development Authority
- 2005–06 to 2012–13: Lahore Shalimar

Career statistics
Competition	FC	List A
Matches	163	104
Runs scored	9168	3017
Batting average	38.68	36.34
100s/50s	17/50	3/17
Top score	289	122*
Balls bowled	903	389
Wickets	5	10
Bowling average	106.80	30.20
5 wickets in innings	0	0
10 wickets in match	0	n/a
Best bowling	2/30	2/23
Catches/stumpings	123/–	42/–
- Source: Cricinfo, 7 December 2022

Aamer Sajjad (born 5 February 1981) is a Pakistani former first-class cricketer. A right-handed batsman and right-arm off-spin bowler, he played first-class cricket from 2002 to 2018.

In 2009–10 he scored more runs than anybody else in the Pakistan season, finishing with 1,435 runs at an average of 68.33. Opening the batting for Water and Power Development Authority (WAPDA) against Sui Southern Gas Company, he made 289, adding 580 for the second wicket with Rafatullah Mohmand. It is the highest second-wicket partnership, and the second-highest partnership of all, in first-class cricket history.

He was selected for the Pakistan A tours of Sri Lanka in August and September 2010, and the West Indies in November. When the regular captain, Rana Naved-ul-Hasan, was absent, he often captained the WAPDA team. In February 2021, he began to undertake coaching courses with the Pakistan Cricket Board.
