= Naseer Akram =

Pakistani cricketer (born 1984)

Personal information
- Born: 12 April 1984 (age 42); Faisalabad, Pakistan
- Source: Cricinfo, 21 December 2015

Naseer Akram (born 12 April 1984) is a Pakistani first-class cricketer who plays for Water and Power Development Authority.
