= Raza Ali Dar =

Pakistani cricketer (born 1987)

Personal information
- Born: 11 December 1987 (age 38); Lahore, Pakistan
- Batting: Left-handed
- Bowling: Slow left-arm orthodox
- Role: All-rounder

Domestic team information
- Years: Team
- Lahore
- 2017: Rajshahi Kings
- Source: Cricinfo, 29 November 2015

Raza Ali Dar (born 11 December 1987) is a Pakistani cricketer who plays for Lahore cricket team. He made his first-class debut for Karachi Port Trust against Zarai Traqiata Bank Limited at Peshawar on 15 December 2003. In April 2018, he was named in Federal Areas' squad for the 2018 Pakistan Cup.
