= Ali Shan (cricketer) =

Pakistani cricketer (born 1994)

Personal information
- Full name: Ali Shan
- Born: 17 October 1994 (age 32); Faisalabad, Punjab, Pakistan
- Source: Cricinfo, 12 August 2017

Ali Shan (born 17 October 1994) is a Pakistani cricketer who plays for Central Punjab. He made his first-class debut for Faisalabad in the 2017–18 Quaid-e-Azam Trophy on 26 September 2017. In September 2019, he was named in Central Punjab's squad for the 2019–20 Quaid-e-Azam Trophy tournament. In January 2021, he was named in Central Punjab's squad for the 2020–21 Pakistan Cup.
