= Waqas Maqsood =

Pakistani cricketer

Personal information
- Born: 4 November 1987 (age 39); Faisalabad, Pakistan
- Nickname: Chalbaaz
- Batting: Left-handed
- Bowling: Left-arm fast-medium

International information
- National side: Pakistan (2018-2018)
- Only T20I (cap 80): 4 November 2018 v New Zealand

Domestic team information
- Years: Team
- 2017: WAPDA
- 2019; 2022: Islamabad United
- 2019/20–present: Central Punjab
- 2020–2021: Karachi Kings
- Source: Cricinfo, 1 February 2022

Waqas Maqsood (born 4 November 1987) is a Pakistani cricketer who plays for Central Punjab and the Pakistan cricket team. He made his T20I debut for Pakistan in November 2018.

== Domestic career ==
In December 2017, he took his best figures in an innings in a first-class match, with nine wickets for WAPDA against Khan Research Laboratories in the 2017–18 Quaid-e-Azam Trophy.

In April 2018, he was named in Federal Areas' squad for the 2018 Pakistan Cup. He finished the tournament as the leading wicket-taker, with fourteen dismissals in five matches. In March 2019, he was named in Federal Areas' squad for the 2019 Pakistan Cup.

In September 2019, he was named in Central Punjab's squad for the 2019–20 Quaid-e-Azam Trophy tournament. In January 2021, he was named in Central Punjab's squad for the 2020–21 Pakistan Cup.

In November 2023, he was named in Faisalabad Region squad for the season 2023–24 Pakistan Cup & National T20.

== International career ==
In October 2018, he was named in Pakistan's Twenty20 International (T20I) squad for their series against Australia. Despite being the only member of the Pakistan squad not to play in a match against Australia, he was also selected for Pakistan's T20I series against New Zealand. He made his T20I debut for Pakistan against New Zealand on 4 November 2018.
