= Mohammad Mohsin (cricketer, born 1993) =

Pakistani cricketer (born 1993)

Personal information
- Born: 31 December 1993 (age 32)
- Source: Cricinfo, 21 October 2017

Mohammad Mohsin (born 31 December 1993) is a Pakistani cricketer. He made his first-class debut for Water and Power Development Authority in the President's Trophy on 22 January 2014. He made his List A debut for Water and Power Development Authority in the 2011–12 Faysal Bank One Day National Cup on 8 March 2012. He made his Twenty20 debut for Multan in the 2018–19 National T20 Cup on 11 December 2018.

In October and November 2021, Mohsin played for Negombo Cricket Club in the 2021–22 Major Clubs Limited Over Tournament in Sri Lanka.
