= Bilawal Iqbal =

Pakistani cricketer (born 1989)

Personal information
- Born: 17 August 1989 (age 37); Jhelum, Pakistan
- Source: Cricinfo, 17 December 2015

Bilawal Iqbal (born 17 August 1989) is a Pakistani cricketer who plays for Central Punjab. In January 2021, he was named in Central Punjab's squad for the 2020–21 edition of the List-A Pakistan Cup.
