= Waqas Ahmed (cricketer, born 1992) =

Pakistani cricketer and coach (born 1992)

Personal information
- Born: 11 March 1992 (age 34); Lahore, Punjab, Pakistan
- Source: Cricinfo

Waqas Ahmed (born 11 March 1992) is a Pakistani first-class cricketer who played for Karachi.

In September 2019, he was named in Northern's squad for the 2019–20 Quaid-e-Azam Trophy tournament.
