= Zahid Mansoor =

Pakistani cricketer (born 1989)

Personal information
- Born: 29 December 1989 (age 36); Rawalpindi, Pakistan
- Source: Cricinfo, 21 December 2015

Zahid Mansoor (born 29 December 1989) is a Pakistani cricketer. He has played for multiple team, including Water and Power Development Authority.
