= Usman Salahuddin =

Pakistani cricketer

Personal information
- Full name: Usman Salahuddin
- Born: 2 December 1990 (age 35); Lahore, Punjab, Pakistan
- Batting: Right-handed
- Role: Batsman

International information
- National side: Pakistan (2011–2018)
- Only Test (cap 232): 1 June 2018 v England
- ODI debut (cap 184): 2 May 2011 v West Indies
- Last ODI: 5 May 2011 v West Indies

Domestic team information
- Years: Team
- 2007/08–2012/13: Lahore Shalimar
- 2014/15: State Bank of Pakistan
- 2015/16–2018/19: Lahore Whites
- 2016/17: National Bank of Pakistan
- 2019–present: Central Punjab

Career statistics
| Competition | Test | ODI | FC | LA |
|---|---|---|---|---|
| Matches | 1 | 2 | 60 | 34 |
| Runs scored | 37 | 13 | 3,868 | 878 |
| Batting average | 27.29 | 6.50 | 47.04 | 46.1 |
| 100s/50s | 0/0 | 0/0 | 13/22 | 0/5 |
| Top score | 33 | 8 | 161* | 76 |
| Catches/stumpings | 0/– | 1/– | 40/– | 17/– |
- Source: Cricinfo, 3 June 2018

Usman Salahuddin (Urdu: عثمان صلاح الدین; born 2 December 1990) is a Pakistani international cricketer who was selected in the national team to play against the West Indies for the May 2011 series. A right-handed batsman, Salahuddin averages 36 in List A cricket and 47 in First-class cricket. He represented Lahore Eagles in Faysal Bank T20 Cup in the 2012–13 season.

In the 2016 season, he was signed by Newcastle City Cricket Club as their pro. In April 2017, he was added to Pakistan's Test squad for their series against the West Indies, but he did not get an opportunity to play in the series. He regained his place for the Test series against Sri Lanka played in September and October 2017, but again, did not play.

In April 2018, he was named in Pakistan's Test squad for their tours to Ireland and England in May 2018. He made his Test debut against England on 1 June 2018. In August 2018, he was one of thirty-three players to be awarded a central contract for the 2018–19 season by the Pakistan Cricket Board (PCB).

In September 2019, he was named in Central Punjab's squad for the 2019–20 Quaid-e-Azam Trophy tournament. In December 2020, during the 2020–21 Quaid-e-Azam Trophy, Salahuddin scored his maiden double century in first-class cricket, with an unbeaten 219. In January 2021, he was named in Central Punjab's squad for the 2020–21 Pakistan Cup. In October 2021, he was named in the Pakistan Shaheens squad for their tour of Sri Lanka. From 2026, he will be the overseas pro at Lutterworth CC.
