= Faisalabad cricket team =

Cricket team

Faisalabad Cricket Team
Personnel
- Captain: Mohammad Huraira
- Coach: Tanvir Shaukat

Team information
- Founded: 2023; 2 years ago
- Home ground: Iqbal Stadium
- Capacity: 25,000

Faisalabad Cricket Team is a Pakistani first-class cricket team representing Faisalabad, Punjab. The team's home ground is Iqbal Stadium, Faisalabad. They participate in the Quaid-e-Azam Trophy. It was refounded in the 2023/24 season after a revamp of the domestic structure.

== History ==
=== Before 2023 ===
Its limited overs team was called Faisalabad Wolves. Kit colours were white for first-class cricket matches and green for one-day and 20/20 competitions. In April 2017, they regained their first-class status after beating Multan and as a result played in the 2017–18 Quaid-e-Azam Trophy tournament.

=== Since 2023 ===
In 2023, the Faisalabad cricket team was refounded as part of the restructuring of the Pakistani domestic system.

== Current Squad ==
Players with international caps are listed in bold. List of players to have played for the First XI in First Class Cricket in the 2023-24 Season

Name	Birth date	Batting style	Bowling style	Notes
Batsmen
Muhammad Hurraira	25 April 2002 (age 21)	Right-handed		
Ali Waqas	26 December 1989 (age 33)	Left-handed	Right-arm off spin	
Irfan Khan	28 December 2002 (age 20)	Right-handed	Right-arm medium-fast	
Abubakar Khan	15 May 1993 (age 30)	Right-handed	Right-arm off spin	
**Asif Ali**	1 October 1991 (age 32)	Right-handed	Right-arm off spin	
Azeem Ghumman	24 January 1991 (age 32)	Right-handed	Right-arm leg spin	
Taimoor Sultan	4 December 1994 (age 28)	Right-handed		
Raees Ahmed	13 December 1994 (age 28)	Right-handed	Right-arm off spin	
Abdul Samad	25 January 1998 (age 25)	Right-handed		
Mohammad Saleem	20 November 1998 (age 24)	Right-handed	Right-arm off spin	
Awaiz Zafar	10 May 2000 (age 23)	Right-handed		
All-Rounders
**Faheem Ashraf**	16 January 1994 (age 29)	Left-handed	Right-arm medium	
Ahmed Safi Abdullah	1 March 1998 (age 25)	Left-handed	Slow left-arm orthodox	
Wicket-keepers
Ali Shan	17 October 1994 (age 29)	Right-handed	Right-arm off spin	
Spin Bowlders
Ali Asfand	22 November 2004 (age 18)	Right-handed	Slow left-arm orthodox	
Pace Bowlers
**Mohammad Ali**	1 November 1992 (age 30)	Right-handed	Right-arm medium-fast	
Khurram Shahzad	25 November 1999 (age 23)	Right-handed	Right-arm medium	
Arshad Iqbal	26 December 2000 (age 22)	Right-handed	Right-arm medium-fast	
Shehzad Gul		Left-handed	Left-arm medium	
Asad Raza	25 December 1997 (age 25)	Right-handed		

== Management and coaching staff ==
Position	Name
Head coach	Tanvir Shaukat
Specialist coach	Tahir Mahmood
Fielding coach	Rizwan Qureshi
Analyst	Asif Hussain
