= Ali Waqas =

Pakistani cricketer (born 1989)

Personal information
- Born: 26 December 1989 (age 36); Sargodha, Punjab, Pakistan
- Batting: Left-handed
- Bowling: Right-arm offbreak

Career statistics
Competition	FC	LA	T20
Matches	102	55	55
Runs scored	5,536	1,567	1,138
Batting average	35.94	32.64	25.86
100s/50s	10/27	3/7	0/5
Top score	175	121*	72
Catches/stumpings	89/–	18/–	17/–
Medal record
Men's Cricket
Representing Pakistan
South Asian Games
Bronze medal – third place	2010 Dhaka	Team
- Source: Cricinfo, 20 April 2025

Ali Waqas (born 26 December 1989) is a Pakistani cricketer. He was the leading run-scorer for Sui Northern Gas Pipelines Limited in the 2018–19 Quaid-e-Azam One Day Cup, with 237 runs in six matches, including one century (102) and an average of 39.50.
