= 2015–16 Quaid-e-Azam Trophy =

- Dates: 26 October 2015 – 7 January 2016
- Administrator: Pakistan Cricket Board
- Cricket format: First-class
- Tournament format(s): Two round-robin group stages and final
- Host: Pakistan
- Champions: SNGPL (3rd title)
- Participants: 16
- Matches: 62
- Most runs: Asif Zakir (791)
- Most wickets: Mohammad Abbas (61)
- Official website: www.pcb.com.pk

The 2015–16 Quaid-e-Azam Trophy was the 58th edition of the Quaid-e-Azam Trophy, the premier domestic first-class cricket competition in Pakistan. It was contested by 16 teams representing eight regional associations and eight departments. (Note: The top level of domestic cricket in Pakistan was historically played by teams representing regional cricket associations and departments, which were owned and run by corporations, institutions or government departments.)

The Pakistan Cricket Board (PCB) restructured the Quaid-e-Azam Trophy just one season after implementing the previous changes. The number of teams was reduced from 26 to 16 with 12 automatic qualifiers and four additional teams gaining entry via two new pre-qualifying competitions, one for regions and the other for departments. The competition proper was contested via two round-robin group stages, with a final to determine the winner. Among the qualifiers was Federally Administered Tribal Areas, which competed in the Quaid-e-Azam Trophy first-class competition for the first time.

Following the completion of the preliminary group stages, six departments (Sui Northern Gas Pipelines Limited, National Bank of Pakistan, Water and Power Development Authority, United Bank Limited, Khan Research Laboratories and Sui Southern Gas Corporation) and two regions (Karachi Whites and Lahore Blues) qualified for the Super Eight stage of the competition. United Bank Limited and Sui Northern Gas Pipelines Limited topped the Super Eight groups to advance to the final, where Sui Northern Gas Pipelines Limited won by 6 wickets to defend their title.

== Structure and competition format ==
Despite having unveiled a revised format in 2015 which was intended to last five seasons, the PCB decided to overhaul the structure after just one season. The number of teams was reduced from 26 down to 16, made up of eight regional associations and eight departments; six of each were automatically qualified based on their record in 2014–15, and the remainder had to earn their place through a corresponding qualifying tournament, although the bottom teams from 2014–15 (Quetta and Pakistan Television) were not eligible as they were relegated directly to Grade II cricket.

The sixteen teams were divided into two groups, with four regions and four departments in each. After a round-robin of matches, the top four teams in each group advanced to a second group stage, called the "Super Eight", with four teams in each group. After a further round-robin, the top team in each group advanced to the final.

== Qualifying ==
Two qualifying competitions were held, one for regional associations and one for departments. Making it through from the regional competition were Federally Administered Tribal Areas, advancing to the Quaid-e-Azam Trophy first-class competition for the first time, and Lahore Blues. Sui Southern Gas Company (SSGC) and Khan Research Laboratories (KRL) qualified from the departments. Under the previous system, Karachi Port Trust had been set to return to first-class cricket, having won the Patron's Trophy Grade II the previous season but following the restructuring, they missed out in the qualifying tournament.

== Group stage ==
=== Tables ===
Pool A
Team	Pld	W	L	D	Pts
Sui Northern Gas Pipelines Ltd. (Q)	7	3	0	4	40
United Bank Ltd. (Q)	7	3	0	4	35
Lahore Blues (Q)	7	2	2	3	22
Sui Southern Gas Corp. (Q)	7	1	1	5	16
Peshawar	7	0	0	7	13
Port Qasim Authority	7	1	1	5	11
Islamabad	7	1	2	4	7
Hyderabad	7	0	5	2	6

Pool B
Team	Pld	W	L	D	Pts
National Bank of Pakistan (Q)	7	3	1	3	36
Khan Research Labs. (Q)	7	4	1	2	33
Karachi Whites (Q)	7	2	2	3	28
Water and Power Dev. Auth. (Q)	7	2	1	4	25
Habib Bank Ltd.	7	2	1	4	22
Rawalpindi	7	1	2	4	12
Lahore Whites	7	0	4	3	9
Federally Administered Tribal Areas	7	1	3	3	6

(Q) The top four teams in each group advanced to the Super Eight stage

Position determined by total points, most matches won, fewest matches lost, followed by adjusted net run rate (matches with no result, i.e. those where both teams did not complete their first innings, were disregarded); matches finishing in a draw were decided on first innings scores, with points awarded as follows:
- Win by an innings = 10 points
- Win having led on first innings = 9 points
- Win having tied or trailed on first innings = 6 points
- Tie having led on first innings = 5 points
- Draw having led on first innings = 3 points
- Draw having tied on first innings, or tie having trailed on first innings = 2 points
- Draw with no result on first innings, or abandoned without a ball bowled = 1 point
- Loss, or draw having trailed on first innings = 0 points

=== Results ===
==== Pool A ====
===== Round 1 =====
26–29 October 2015
Scorecard

United Bank Limited	v	Islamabad
399 (114.2 overs); Umair Khan 90 (236); Afaq Raheem 3/44 (14.2 overs)		111 (29.3 overs); Zohaib Ahmed 51 (51); Mir Hamza 5/30 (12.3 overs)
		168 (49.4 overs) (f/o); Naeem Anjum 34 (82); Ehsan Adil 4/47 (12 overs)

United Bank Limited won by an innings and 120 runs
Diamond Club Ground, Islamabad
Umpires: Imtiaz Iqbal and Sajid Afridi

- Islamabad won the toss and elected to field.

26–29 October 2015
Scorecard

Peshawar	v	Sui Northern Gas Pipelines Limited
231 (74.4 overs); Gauhar Ali 56 (91); Samiullah Khan 3/57 (15 overs)		411/5d (92 overs); Naeemuddin 162 (223); Israrullah 2/30 (10 overs)
153/4 (62 overs); Zohaib Khan 50* (141); Imran Khalid 2/29 (19 overs)

Match drawn
Arbab Niaz Stadium, Peshawar
Umpires: Asif Yaqoob and Qaiser Waheed

- Sui Northern Gas Pipelines Limited won the toss and elected to field.

26–29 October 2015
Scorecard

Hyderabad	v	Port Qasim Authority
402 (110.4 overs); Azeem Ghumman 188 (288); Azam Hussain 4/89 (29.4 overs)		382 (115.4 overs); Mohammad Salman 88 (198); Sajjad Hussain 3/87 (24 overs)
268 (80.3 overs); Mir Ali 63 (75); Azam Hussain 5/94 (30 overs)		192/3 (32.1 overs); Shahzaib Hasan 100 (86); Sajjad Hussain 1/20 (4 overs)

Match drawn
Niaz Stadium, Hyderabad
Umpires: Riazuddin and Tahir Rasheed

- Port Qasim Authority won the toss and elected to field.
- Mohammad Sohail (Hyderabad) made his first-class debut.

26–29 October 2015
Scorecard

Lahore Blues	v	Sui Southern Gas Corporation
301 (95 overs); Tayyab Tahir 87 (203); Mohammad Amir 3/55 (21 overs)		256 (105.2 overs); Asif Zakir 115* (276); Saad Nasim 3/39 (18.2 overs)
221 (89.4 overs); Agha Salman 85 (191); Mohammad Irfan 3/43 (24.4 overs)		52/1 (13 overs); Babar Azam 37* (45); Waqas Ahmed 1/25 (4 overs)

Match drawn
Gaddafi Stadium, Lahore
Umpires: Khalid Mahmood and Saqib Khan

- Sui Southern Gas Corporation won the toss and elected to field.
- Tayyab Tahir (Lahore Blues) made his first-class debut.

===== Round 2 =====
2–5 November 2015
Scorecard

Sui Northern Gas Pipelines Limited	v	Islamabad
182 (53.5 overs); Hussain Talat 42 (100); Hasan Ali 6/47 (17 overs)		93 (31.5 overs); Naeem Anjum 39* (63); Asad Ali 4/26 (10 overs)
127 (39 overs); Imran Butt 50 (79); Shehzad Azam 4/33 (16 overs)		126/3 (33 overs); Faizan Riaz 61* (90); Asad Ali 3/27 (11 overs)

Match drawn
Diamond Club Ground, Islamabad
Umpires: Ghaffar Kazmi and Sajid Afridi

- Islamabad won the toss and elected to field.

2–5 November 2015
Scorecard

United Bank Limited	v	Peshawar
324 (89.5 overs); Sohaib Maqsood 74 (116); Zohaib Khan 3/39 (13 overs)		332/6 (103 overs); Akbar Badshah 106* (147); Rumman Raees 2/62 (19 overs)
58/0 (13 overs); Sharjeel Khan 47* (50)

Match drawn
Arbab Niaz Stadium, Peshawar
Umpires: Khalid Mahmood and Rashid Riaz

- Peshawar won the toss and elected to field.
- Mohammad Mohsin and Shah Faisal (Peshawar) made their first-class debuts.

2–5 November 2015
Scorecard

Port Qasim Authority	v	Lahore Blues
230 (54.4 overs); Shahzaib Hasan 87 (78); Aizaz Cheema 5/42 (17.4 overs)		101 (27 overs); Farhan Khan 28* (26); Zohaib Shera 6/46 (11 overs)
287/8d (60 overs); Khurram Manzoor 72 (79); Aizaz Cheema 4/63 (15 overs)		185 (47 overs); Mohammad Akhlaq 56 (83); Azam Hussain 4/19 (8 overs)

Port Qasim Authority won by 231 runs
Gaddafi Stadium, Lahore
Umpires: Nasar Khan and Saqib Khan

- Lahore Blues won the toss and elected to field.

2–5 November 2015
Scorecard

Sui Southern Gas Corporation	v	Hyderabad
529 (138.1 overs); Babar Azam 167 (289); Sajjad Hussain 3/86 (26 overs)		80 (39 overs); Rizwan Ahmed 26* (105); Mohammad Amir 5/29 (11 overs)
		70 (23.5 overs) (f/o); Faisal Athar 31* (50)

Sui Southern Gas Corporation won by an innings and 379 runs
Niaz Stadium, Hyderabad
Umpires: Riazuddin and Tahir Rasheed

- Sui Southern Gas Corporation won the toss and elected to bat.

===== Round 3 =====
9–12 November 2015
Scorecard

Sui Northern Gas Pipelines Limited	v	Hyderabad
331 (78.4 overs); Taufeeq Umar 67 (95); Hazrat Shah 3/82 (16 overs)		271 (92.5 overs); Shoaib Laghari 78 (141); Asad Ali 4/34 (15.5 overs)
303/8d (72 overs); Adnan Akmal 55 (55); Sajjad Hussain 2/42 (13 overs)		210 (69.1 overs); Azeem Ghumman 51 (66); Imran Khalid 5/62 (25.1 overs)

Sui Northern Gas Pipelines Limited won by 153 runs
Niaz Stadium, Hyderabad
Umpires: Khalid Mahmood and Mohammad Rashid

- Sui Northern Gas Pipelines Limited won the toss and elected to bat.

9–12 November 2015
Scorecard

Islamabad	v	Port Qasim Authority
326 (91.5 overs); Abid Ali 136 (188); Zohaib Shera 5/126 (29.5 overs)		114/2 (31 overs); Faraz Ali 57* (102); Shehzad Azam 2/36 (11 overs)

Match drawn
Diamond Club Ground, Islamabad
Umpires: Ahmed Shahab and Sajid Afridi

- Port Qasim Authority won the toss and elected to field.
- Munir-ur-Rehman (Islamabad) made his first-class debut.

9–12 November 2015
Scorecard

United Bank Limited	v	Lahore Blues
432/5d (116 overs); Saeed Bin Nasir 128 (146); Agha Salman 2/24 (8 overs)		96 (31.1 overs); Agha Salman 56 (77); Ehsan Adil 4/38 (13 overs)
		130 (32 overs) (f/o); Farhan Khan 46 (52); Yasim Murtaza 4/7 (2 overs)

United Bank Limited won by an innings and 206 runs
Gaddafi Stadium, Lahore
Umpires: Imtiaz Iqbal and Nasar Khan

- Lahore Blues won the toss and elected to field.

9–12 November 2015
Scorecard

Peshawar	v	Sui Southern Gas Corporation
246 (75.4 overs); Akbar Badshah 53 (106); Tabish Khan 3/65 (20 overs)		117/4 (36.1 overs); Asif Zakir 47* (89); Nasir Ahmed 3/40 (10 overs)

Match drawn
Arbab Niaz Stadium, Peshawar
Umpires: Rashid Riaz and Zameer Haider

- Sui Southern Gas Corporation won the toss and elected to field.

===== Round 4 =====
16–19 November 2015
Scorecard

Hyderabad	v	United Bank Limited
259 (74.5 overs); Sharjeel Khan 73 (92); Sajjad Hussain 3/62 (17 overs)		197 (67.5 overs); Zeeshan Gul 63 (207); Mir Hamza 5/42 (16.5 overs)
392/9d (84.5 overs); Yasim Murtaza 83 (71); Sajjad Hussain 5/72 (20 overs)		191 (64.1 overs); Mir Ali 84 (73); Yasim Murtaza 3/27 (11 overs)

United Bank Limited won by 263 runs
Niaz Stadium, Hyderabad
Umpires: Khalid Mahmood and Mohammad Rashid

- Hyderabad won the toss and elected to field.

16–19 November 2015
Scorecard

Sui Southern Gas Corporation	v	Islamabad
375 (113.4 overs); Umar Amin 161 (258); Hasan Ali 5/65 (29 overs)		325 (96 overs); Abid Ali 131 (287); Mohammad Amir 3/52 (22 overs)
216/8d (57 overs); Usman Tariq 59 (98); Hasan Ali 3/68 (17 overs)		69/1 (19 overs); Afaq Raheem 44 (69); Mohammad Irfan 1/14 (9 overs)

Match drawn
Diamond Club Ground, Islamabad
Umpires: Ahmed Shahab and Qaiser Waheed

- Islamabad won the toss and elected to field.

16–19 November 2015
Scorecard

Sui Northern Gas Pipelines Limited	v	Lahore Blues
445 (105.5 overs); Adnan Akmal 148 (181); Agha Salman 4/60 (24.5 overs)		380 (100 overs); Saad Nasim 104 (90); Asad Ali 5/94 (26 overs)
251/6d (39 overs); Misbah-ul-Haq 58 (40); Malik Aftab 3/70 (9 overs)		262/6 (62 overs); Waqas Saleem 78 (115); Imran Khalid 3/86 (24 overs)

Match drawn
Gaddafi Stadium, Lahore
Umpires: Imtiaz Iqbal and Mir Dad

- Lahore Blues won the toss and elected to field.
- Daniyal Zahid and Mohsin Nadeem (Lahore Blues) both made their first-class debuts.

16–19 November 2015
Scorecard

Port Qasim Authority	v	Peshawar
107 (39.5 overs); Kamran Younis 32 (78); Taj Wali 5/30 (16.5 overs)		490/4d (120 overs); Zohaib Khan 154* (269); Azam Hussain 3/126 (39 overs)
416 (144.2 overs); Khalid Latif 134 (274); Taj Wali 3/151 (37 overs)		10/1 (2 overs); Israrullah 7 (10); Mohammad Talha 1/7 (1 over)

Match drawn
Arbab Niaz Stadium, Peshawar
Umpires: Majid Hussain and Shameem Ansari

- Port Qasim Authority won the toss and elected to bat.
- Mehran Alam and Wasif Nawaz (Peshawar) made their first-class debuts.
- Taj Wali (PQA) became the first bowler in more than 20 years to take four wickets in four balls in the Quaid-e-Azam Trophy.

===== Round 5 =====
23–26 November 2015
Scorecard

Hyderabad	v	Islamabad
279 (79.5 overs); Shoaib Laghari 48 (39); Shehzad Azam 3/47 (18 overs)		211 (54.1 overs); Zohaib Ahmed 68 (113); Babar Khan 6/59 (10.1 overs)
200 (58.5 overs); Shoaib Laghari 76* (111); Shehzad Azam 6/38 (23 overs)		272/1 (57.5 overs); Ali Sarfraz 133* (150); Kashif Bhatti 1/53 (16 overs)

Islamabad won by 9 wickets
Diamond Club Ground, Islamabad
Umpires: Sajid Afridi and Saqib Khan

- Hyderabad won the toss and elected to bat.

23–26 November 2015
Scorecard

Lahore Blues	v	Peshawar
267 (86.4 overs); Saad Nasim 67 (101); Umair Khan 4/60 (21 overs)		295 (106 overs); Zohaib Khan 108 (251); Ahmed Bashir 4/67 (24 overs)
328/5 (100 overs); Tayyab Tahir 96 (207); Ashfaq Ahmed 1/13 (6 overs)

Match drawn
Lahore City Cricket Association Ground
Umpires: Imtiaz Iqbal and Riazuddin

- Peshawar won the toss and elected to field.

23–26 November 2015
Scorecard

Port Qasim Authority	v	Sui Northern Gas Pipelines Limited
119 (42.3 overs); Shahzaib Hasan 30 (57); Ahmed Safi Abdullah 3/21 (7 overs)		307 (94.2 overs); Azhar Ali 142 (271); Zohaib Shera 6/84 (30 overs)
69 (21.5 overs); Shahzaib Hasan 19 (35); Azizullah 6/36 (10.5 overs)

Sui Northern Gas Pipelines Limited won by an innings and 119 runs
Iqbal Stadium, Faisalabad
Umpires: Tahir Shah and Zameer Haider

- Sui Northern Gas Pipelines Limited won the toss and elected to field.
- Taimur Sultan (Sui Northern Gas Pipelines Limited) made his first-class debut.

23–26 November 2015
Scorecard

United Bank Limited	v	Sui Southern Gas Corporation
514/8d (123 overs); Shan Masood 97 (103); Adnan Ghaus 3/125 (31 overs)		244 (79.4 overs); Awais Zia 72 (125); Mir Hamza 4/50 (27 overs)
293/6 (73 overs); Babar Azam 90 (124); Yasim Murtaza 3/75 (18 overs)

Match drawn
Marghzar Cricket Ground, Islamabad
Umpires: Qaiser Waheed and Rashid Riaz

- United Bank Limited won the toss and elected to bat.

===== Round 6 =====
30 November–3 December 2015
Scorecard

Lahore Blues	v	Islamabad
188 (65.4 overs); Mohammad Ikhlaq 67 (118); Hasan Ali 4/48 (17.1 overs)		169 (50.3 overs); Abid Ali 89 (125); Bilawal Iqbal 5/40 (20 overs)
159 (37.2 overs); Bilawal Iqbal 42 (66); Hasan Ali 6/43 (13 overs)		165 (47.1 overs); Faizan Riaz 35 (59); Ahmed Bashir 4/57 (14.1 overs)

Lahore Blues won by 13 runs
Diamond Club Ground, Islamabad
Umpires: Sajid Afridi and Tahir Rasheed

- Islamabad won the toss and elected to field.
- Haris Nazar (Lahore Blues) made his first-class debut.

30 November–3 December 2015
Scorecard

Peshawar	v	Hyderabad
223 (78.1 overs); Mehran Ibrahim 79 (142); Nasir Awais 5/44 (26.1 overs)		392 (110.4 overs); Rizwan Ahmed 107 (233); Taj Wali 5/85 (25 overs)
350/4 (115 overs); Ashfaq Ahmed 157 (320); Shoaib Laghari 1/12 (8 overs)

Match drawn
Arbab Niaz Stadium, Peshawar
Umpires: Mir Dad and Mohammad Rashid

- Hyderabad won the toss and elected to field.

30 November–3 December 2015
Scorecard

Sui Southern Gas Corporation	v	Sui Northern Gas Pipelines Limited
124 (63.3 overs); Umar Amin 64* (176); Azizullah 4/31 (15 overs)		256 (77.4 overs); Taufeeq Umar 80 (152); Adnan Ghaus 5/66 (16 overs)
303 (95.5 overs); Umar Amin 106 (262); Azhar Ali 4/55 (18.5 overs)		172/5 (47.2 overs); Adnan Akmal 55 (79); Adnan Ghaus 2/41 (13 overs)

Sui Northern Gas Pipelines Limited won by 5 wickets
Iqbal Stadium, Faisalabad
Umpires: Asif Yaqoob and Irfan Dilshad

- Sui Northern Gas Pipelines Limited won the toss and elected to field.
- Faizan Khan (Sui Southern Gas Corporation) made his first-class debut.

30 November–3 December 2015
Scorecard

United Bank Limited	v	Port Qasim Authority
318 (84.4 overs); Umar Siddiq 113 (217); Zohaib Shera 6/80 (22.4 overs)		215 (60 overs); Khalid Latif 172* (207); Ehsan Adil 6/61 (15 overs)
395/9d (105.2 overs); Umar Siddiq 174 (284); Azam Hussain 5/91 (22.2 overs)		204/7 (40 overs); Khurram Manzoor 80 (80); Saeed Bin Nasir 3/17 (6 overs)

Match drawn
Marghzar Cricket Ground, Islamabad
Umpires: Tahir Shah and Waleed Yaqub

- Port Qasim Authority won the toss and elected to field.
- Noor Wali, Waqar Ahmed (Port Qasim Authority) and Sameen Gul (United Bank Limited) all made their first-class debuts.

===== Round 7 =====
7–10 December 2015
Scorecard

Hyderabad	v	Lahore Blues
122 (48 overs); Haris Khan 30 (75); Aizaz Cheema 3/30 (20 overs)		424/9d (140.4 overs); Waqas Saleem 192 (366); Nasir Awais 4/115 (48.4 overs)
118 (47.3 overs); Haris Khan 35 (95); Aizaz Cheema 4/43 (17.3 overs)

Lahore Blues won by an innings and 184 runs
Niaz Stadium, Hyderabad
Umpires: Imtiaz Iqbal and Shameem Ansari

- Lahore Blues won the toss and elected to field.

7–10 December 2015
Scorecard

Islamabad	v	Peshawar
129 (45.5 overs); Afaq Raheem 38 (121); Taj Wali 5/33 (14.5 overs)		170 (53.5 overs); Musadiq Ahmed 42 (81); Shehzad Azam 6/38 (18.5 overs)
96/1 (37 overs); Afaq Raheem 49* (114); Taj Wali 1/25 (11 overs)

Match drawn
Arbab Niaz Stadium, Peshawar
Umpires: Tahir Shah and Waleed Yaqub

- Peshawar won the toss and elected to field.
- No play was possible on days 3 and 4.

7–10 December 2015
Scorecard

Port Qasim Authority	v	Sui Southern Gas Corporation
283 (85 overs); Atif Ali 72 (167); Adnan Ghaus 4/69 (22 overs)		208/6 (66 overs); Awais Zia 72* (121); Waqar Ahmed 2/41 (14 overs)

Match drawn
Diamond Club Ground, Islamabad
Umpires: Majid Hussain and Qaiser Waheed

- Port Qasim Authority won the toss and elected to bat.
- No play was possible on day 4.

7–10 December 2015
Scorecard

United Bank Limited	v	Sui Northern Gas Pipelines Limited
132 (55.3 overs); Saeed Bin Nasir 36 (95); Azizullah 5/33 (15.3 overs)		230 (81.4 overs); Imran Khalid 113 (190); Ehsan Adil 5/69 (22.4 overs)
112/3 (38 overs); Umar Siddiq 48* (119); Azizullah 1/14 (8 overs)

Match drawn
Rawalpindi Cricket Stadium
Umpires: Khalid Mahmood and Mohammad Rashid

- United Bank Limited won the toss and elected to bat.
- No play was possible on day 4.

==== Pool B ====
===== Round 1 =====
26–29 October 2015
Scorecard

Lahore Whites	v	National Bank of Pakistan
178 (75.5 overs); Usman Salahuddin 46 (122); Mohammad Asghar 4/41 (24.5 overs)		408 (108 overs); Kamran Akmal 140 (170); Fahad Masood 3/78 (23 overs)
218 (89.1 overs); Mohammad Waqas 66 (217); Zia-ul-Haq 4/39 (16.1 overs)

National Bank of Pakistan won by an innings and 12 runs
Lahore City Cricket Association Ground, Lahore
Umpires: Majid Hussain and Mir Dad

- National Bank of Pakistan won the toss and elected to field.
- Anas Mahmood, Kamil Akram, Sajid Watto and Shuja Haider (Lahore Whites) all made their first-class debuts.

26–29 October 2015
Scorecard

Karachi Whites	v	Water and Power Development Authority
438 (182.5 overs); Mohammad Waqas 77 (229); Mohammad Ali 3/63 (29 overs)		295 (110.5 overs); Iftikhar Ahmed 87 (206); Sohaib Khan 4/118 (37.5 overs)
83/1 (31 overs); Haris Ali 58* (102); Waqas Maqsood 1/11 (4 overs)

Match drawn
National Stadium, Karachi
Umpires: Ahmed Shahab and Jamil Kamran

- Water and Power Development Authority won the toss and elected to field.
- Haris Ali, Jaahid Ali and Saud Shakeel (Karachi Whites) all made their first-class debuts.

26–29 October 2015
Scorecard

Habib Bank Limited	v	Federally Administered Tribal Areas
404/5 dec (83.4 overs); Fakhar Zaman 205 (218); Mohammad Naeem 2/30 (6 overs)		273 (83.5 overs); Rehan Afridi 103 (128); Amad Butt 4/43 (12.5 overs)
172/1d (30 overs); Fakhar Zaman 65* (72); Asif Afridi 1/64 (8 overs)		114/3 (25.4 overs); Haroon Sadaqat 50* (56); Nauman Anwar 1/3 (1 over)

Match drawn
Jinnah Stadium, Sialkot
Umpires: Rashid Riaz and Shozab Raza

- Federally Administered Tribal Areas won the toss and elected to field.
- Haroon Sadaqat, Irfanullah Shah, Khushdil Shah, Liaqat Ali and Mohammad Sarwar (Federally Administered Tribal Areas); Amad Butt (Habib Bank Limited) all made their first-class debuts.

26–29 October 2015
Scorecard

Rawalpindi	v	Khan Research Laboratories
225 (83 overs); Sohail Tanvir 42 (95); Sadaf Hussain 4/45 (15 overs)		203 (73.3 overs); Saeed Anwar 60 (74); Sohail Tanvir 4/51 (21.3 overs)
145/4 (63 overs); Naved Yasin 56* (133); Majid Ali 2/36 (11 overs)

Match drawn
Rawalpindi Cricket Stadium, Rawalpindi
Umpires: Nasar Khan and Tahir Shah

- Khan Research Laboratories won the toss and elected to field.

===== Round 2 =====
2–5 November 2015
Scorecard

Habib Bank Limited	v	Karachi Whites
181 (59.2 overs); Fakhar Zaman 75 (118); Babar Rehman 4/75 (16 overs)		292 (108.5 overs); Jahid Shaukat 60 (172); Amad Butt 3/79 (24 overs)
387/7d (86.4 overs); Nauman Anwar 199 (238); Adeel Malik 3/94 (29.4 overs)		125/3 (56 overs); Faisal Iqbal 56* (134); Abdur Rehman 2/51 (21 overs)

Match drawn
National Stadium, Karachi
Umpires: Ahmed Shahab and Jamil Kamran

- Karachi Whites won the toss and elected to field.
- Abdullah Muqaddam (Karachi Whites) made his first-class debut.

2–5 November 2015
Scorecard

Federally Administered Tribal Areas	v	National Bank of Pakistan
257 (77.2 overs); Rehan Afridi 88 (115); Faheem Ashraf 5/67 (21.2 overs)		457/6d (106 overs); Kamran Akmal 137 (160); Zeeshan Khan 3/105 (25 overs)
106/2 (28 overs); Mohammad Naeem 40 (90); Faheem Ashraf 1/8 (7 overs)

Match drawn
Jinnah Stadium, Sialkot,
Umpires: Asif Yaqoob and Shozab Raza

- National Bank of Pakistan won the toss and elected to field.
- Razaullah Wazir (Federally Administered Tribal Areas) made his first-class debut.

2–5 November 2015
Scorecard

Rawalpindi	v	Water and Power Development Authority
195 (62 overs); Yasir Arafat 77* (95); Waqas Maqsood 5/58 (16 overs)		307 (80.3 overs); Mohammad Saad 50 (58); Sohail Tanvir 4/56 (22.3 overs)
119/8 (38 overs); Mansoor Amjad 43 (73); Waqas Maqsood 4/37 (12 overs)

Match drawn
Rawalpindi Cricket Stadium, Rawalpindi
Umpires: Abid Naqvi and Irfan Dilshad

- Water and Power Development Authority won the toss and elected to field.

2–5 November 2015
Scorecard

Lahore Whites	v	Khan Research Laboratories
163 (60.5 overs); Junaid Ali 46 (105); Mohammad Abbas 4/41 (19 overs)		171 (61.5 overs); Imam-ul-Haq 78 (176); Asif Raza 3/60 (21 overs)
81 (39.2 overs); Usman Salahuddin 25 (84); Mohammad Abbas 5/36 (13 overs)		77 (13.3 overs); Shoaib Ahmed 32* (21)

Khan Research Laboratories won by 10 wickets
Lahore City Cricket Association Ground, Lahore
Umpires: Imtiaz Iqbal and Shameem Ansari

- Khan Research Laboratories won the toss and elected to field.
- Jamil Khan, Mohammad Waqas and Saif-ur-Rehman (Lahore Whites) all made their first-class debuts.

===== Round 3 =====
9–12 November 2015
Scorecard

Karachi Whites	v	National Bank of Pakistan
227 (105.5 overs); Mohammad Hasan 73 (135); Zia-ul-Haq 6/40 (25 overs)		465/4d (102.3 overs); Fawad Alam 224* (289); Sohaib Khan 2/116 (28 overs)
215 (69 overs); Saad Ali 62 (101); Mohammad Nawaz 3/34 (14 overs)

National Bank of Pakistan won by an innings and 23 runs
National Stadium, Karachi
Umpires: Asif Yaqoob and Waleed Yaqub

- National Bank of Pakistan won the toss and elected to field.
- Ghulam Mudassar and Salman Zaib (Karachi Whites) made their first-class debuts.

9–12 November 2015
Scorecard

Lahore Whites	v	Water and Power Development Authority
344 (115.2 overs); Anas Mahmood 70 (150); Junaid Khan 4/94 (33 overs)		275 (82.1 overs); Mohammad Saad 125 (227); Fahad Masood 4/55 (20.1 overs)
139/4 (46 overs); Mukhtar Ahmed 75 (106); Junaid Khan 1/4 (7 overs)

Match drawn
Lahore City Cricket Association Ground, Lahore
Umpires: Aslam Bareach and Jamil Kamran

- Water and Power Development Authority won the toss and elected to field.

9–12 November 2015
Scorecard

Rawalpindi	v	Habib Bank Limited
183 (41.4 overs); Naved Yasin 76 (59); Amad Butt 5/34 (11.4 overs)		181 (54.3 overs); Imran Farhat 58 (111); Sohail Tanvir 4/54 (16.3 overs)
34/1 (9.4 overs); Naved Malik 30* (28)

Match drawn
Rawalpindi Cricket Stadium, Rawalpindi
Umpires: Saqib Khan and Tahir Shah

- Habib Bank Limited won the toss and elected to field.

9–12 November 2015
Scorecard

Federally Administered Tribal Areas	v	Khan Research Laboratories
168 (78 overs); Haroon Sadaqat 37 (69); Nauman Ali 4/27 (23 overs)		107 (32.5 overs); Saeed Anwar 34 (52); Zeeshan Khan 5/58 (15.5 overs)
99 (30 overs); Samar Gul 25 (61); Mohammad Abbas 5/54 (15 overs)		161/0 (37 overs); Zain Abbas 79* (112)

Khan Research Laboratories won by 10 wickets
Jinnah Stadium, Sialkot
Umpires: Qaiser Waheed and Shameem Ansari

- Khan Research Laboratories won the toss and elected to field.
- Irfanullah, Mohammad Kashif and Samar Gul (Federally Administered Tribal Areas) all made their first-class debuts.

===== Round 4 =====
16–19 November 2015
Scorecard

Water and Power Development Authority	v	Federally Administered Tribal Areas
440 (96.2 overs); Aamer Sajjad 178 (254); Mohammad Irfan 4/129 (30.4 overs)		250 (73.3 overs); Khushdil Shah 122 (159); Waqas Maqsood 3/46 (12 overs)
		186 (45.3 overs) f/o Nisar Khan 37 (30); Waqas Maqsood 4/67 (14 overs)

Water and Power Development Authority won by an innings and 4 runs
Jinnah Stadium, Sialkot
Umpires: Tahir Shah and Zameer Haider

- Water and Power Development Authority won the toss and elected to bat.
- Ibraheem Gul, Majid Khan, Mohammad Irfan, Nisar Khan and Sohrab Khan (Federally Administered Tribal Areas) all made their first-class debuts.

16–19 November 2015
Scorecard

Khan Research Laboratories	v	Karachi Whites
296 (77.2 overs); Nayyer Abbas 85 (128); Sohaib Khan 5/74 (19.2 overs)		424 (137.5 overs); Saud Shakeel 114* (223); Nayyer Abbas 4/95 (34 overs)
328/5 (105.5 overs); Zain Abbas 178 (293); Babar Rehman 2/59 (20.5 overs)

Match drawn
National Stadium, Karachi
Umpires: Asif Yaqoob and Waleed Yaqub

- Karachi Whites won the toss and elected to field.

16–19 November 2015
Scorecard

Lahore Whites	v	Habib Bank Limited
89 (30.1 overs); Asif Raza 41 (39); Umar Gul 7/32 (11.1 overs)		331 (82.1 overs); Aftab Alam 95 (127); Asif Raza 5/91 (24.1 overs)
186 (63.1 overs); Mohammad Waheed 68 (112); Shahid Afridi 3/47 (18 overs)

Habib Bank Limited won by an innings and 56 runs
Lahore City Cricket Association Ground
Umpires: Aslam Bareach and Jamil Kamran

- Habib Bank Limited won the toss and elected to field.

16–19 November 2015
Scorecard

National Bank of Pakistan	v	Rawalpindi
453 (100.4 overs); Akbar-ur-Rehman 128 (138); Saad Altaf 4/125 (28 overs)		236 (64 overs); Usman Saeed 61 (96); Ahmed Jamal 5/26 (10 overs)
		138 (41.3 overs) f/o Naved Yasin 25 (25); Faheem Ashraf 5/35 (13 overs)

National Bank of Pakistan won by an innings and 79 runs
Rawalpindi Cricket Stadium
Umpires: Ghaffar Kazmi and Irfan Dilshad

- Rawalpindi won the toss and elected to field.

===== Round 5 =====
23–26 November 2015
Scorecard

Habib Bank Limited	v	Khan Research Laboratories
278 (94.4 overs); Imran Farhat 95 (173); Mohammad Abbas 6/84 (30.4 overs)		99 (29.2 overs); Luqman Butt 42 (47); Umar Gul 4/31 (10 overs)
133/8d (49 overs); Mohammad Waqas 50* (86); Mohammad Abbas 4/56 (23 overs)		261 (81.2 overs); Luqman Butt 80 (104); Umar Gul 3/54 (20.2 overs)

Habib Bank Limited won by 51 runs
National Ground, Islamabad
Umpires: Irfan Dilshad and Nasar Khan

- Khan Research Laboratories won the toss and elected to field.

23–26 November 2015
Scorecard

Rawalpindi	v	Karachi Whites
172 (50.2 overs); Aqib Shah 54 (105); Adeel Malik 4/54 (21 overs)		209 (62.3 overs); Faisal Iqbal 54 (72); Saad Altaf 4/84 (24.3 overs)
218 (54.4 overs); Usman Saeed 70 (107); Adeel Malik 6/74 (27.4 overs)		91 (43.3 overs); Jaahid Ali 30 (86); Abid Hasan 4/15 (8.3 overs)

Rawalpindi won by 90 runs
Rawalpindi Cricket Stadium
Umpires: Ghaffar Kazmi and Waleed Yaqub

- Karachi Whites won the toss and elected to field.

23–26 November 2015
Scorecard

Federally Administered Tribal Areas	v	Lahore Whites
314 (65.2 overs); Fawad Khan 108 (70); Saif-ur-Rehman 5/76 (14 overs)		508/9d (149 overs); Sami Aslam 221 (435); Zeeshan Khan 3/112 (32 overs)
276/8 (92 overs); Haroon Sadaqat 77* (234); Fahad Masood 4/36 (20 overs)

Match drawn
Gaddafi Stadium, Lahore
Umpires: Aslam Bareach and Mir Dad

- Lahore Whites won the toss and elected to field.

23–26 November 2015
Scorecard

Water and Power Development Authority	v	National Bank of Pakistan
315 (83.5 overs); Aamer Sajjad 100 (155); Zia-ul-Haq 4/82 (22.5 overs)		201 (63 overs); Qaiser Abbas 93* (143); Azhar Attari 6/57 (18 overs)
240/7d (67 overs); Atiq-ur-Rehman 80 (160); Ataullah 3/49 (13.5 overs)		244/4 (66 overs); Akbar-ur-Rehman 102* (187); Waqas Maqsood 2/51 (12 overs)

Match drawn
Jinnah Stadium, Sialkot
Umpires: Asif Yaqoob and Tahir Rasheed

- National Bank of Pakistan won the toss and elected to field.

===== Round 6 =====
30 November–3 December 2015
Scorecard

Karachi Whites	v	Lahore Whites
363 (111.2 overs); Saad Ali 104 (198); Asif Raza 6/127 (38 overs)		145 (50.3 overs); Mohammad Waheed 45 (74); Adeel Malik 5/42 (23.3 overs)
		58 (22.4 overs) f/o Mohammad Waheed 13 (19); Abdullah Muqaddam 5/10 (5.4 overs)

Karachi Whites won by an innings and 160 runs
Gaddafi Stadium, Lahore
Umpires: Majid Hussain and Saqib Khan

- Lahore Whites won the toss and elected to field.
- Mohammad Imran (Lahore Whites) made his first-class debut.

30 November–3 December 2015
Scorecard

National Bank of Pakistan	v	Habib Bank Limited
326 (90 overs); Umar Waheed 100 (233); Altaf Ahmed 4/67 (20 overs)		188 (69 overs); Amad Butt 83* (118); Mohammad Asghar 4/55 (18 overs)
199 (63.3 overs); Fawad Alam 70 (105); Amad Butt 4/59 (20 overs)		136/4 (56 overs); Mohammad Waqas 36 (81); Ahmed Jamal 2/37 (16 overs)

Match drawn
Jinnah Stadium, Sialkot
Umpires: Nasar Khan and Zameer Haider

- Habib Bank Limited won the toss and elected to field.

30 November–3 December 2015
Scorecard

Rawalpindi	v	Federally Administered Tribal Areas
163 (55.1 overs); Aqib Shah 46 (92); Irfanullah Shah 4/44 (19 overs)		89 (33.2 overs); Mohammad Irfan 43 (36); Yasir Arafat 5/33 (17 overs)
105 (27.4 overs); Naved Malik 39 (42); Razaullah Wazir 6/21 (9 overs)		180/6 (53.3 overs); Mohammad Irfan 60* (123); Naseer Ahmed 2/29 (7 overs)

Federally Administered Tribal Areas won by 4 wickets
Rawalpindi Cricket Stadium
Umpires: Aslam Bareach and Qaiser Waheed

- Rawalpindi won the toss and elected to bat.
- This was FATA's maiden win in first-class cricket.

30 November–3 December 2015
Scorecard

Water and Power Development Authority	v	Khan Research Laboratories
187 (63.2 overs); Bismillah Khan 32 (32); Rahat Ali 6/40 (17.2 overs)		212 (86.3 overs); Usman Arshad 61 (139); Zulfiqar Babar 4/50 (23 overs)
159 (61.4 overs); Mohammad Saad 56 (109); Mohammad Abbas 6/51 (21.4 overs)		136/5 (33.1 overs); Shoaib Ahmed 38* (54); Azhar Attari 3/52 (12 overs)

Khan Research Laboratories won by 5 wickets
National Ground, Islamabad
Umpires: Rashid Riaz and Riazuddin

- Khan Research Laboratories won the toss and elected to field.

===== Round 7 =====
7–10 December 2015
Scorecard

Water and Power Development Authority	v	Habib Bank Limited
212 (63.3 overs); Zahid Mansoor 56 (87); Umar Gul 4/39 (13.3 overs)		87 (46.2 overs); Rameez Aziz 12 (51); Waqas Maqsood 6/31 (18.2 overs)
240/5d (65 overs); Ayaz Tasawwar 99 (173); Mohammad Naeem 2/48 (20 overs)		140 (57.4 overs); Hasan Raza 33 (169); Zulfiqar Babar 6/38 (18 overs)

Water and Power Development Authority won by 225 runs
Iqbal Stadium, Faisalabad
Umpires: Riazuddin and Zameer Haider

- Habib Bank Limited won the toss and elected to field.

7–10 December 2015
Scorecard

Karachi Whites	v	Federally Administered Tribal Areas
300 (101.4 overs); Mohammad Waqas 137 (213); Irfanullah Shah 6/76 (29 overs)		141 (39.1 overs); Rehan Afridi 37 (53); Adeel Malik 3/50 (14 overs)
323/7 (89.3 overs); Saud Shakeel 116 (157); Irfanullah Shah 3/95 (28 overs)		478 (92.5 overs) (f/o); Fawad Khan 172 (165); Ghulam Mudassar 3/102 (17 overs)

Karachi Whites won by 3 wickets
National Stadium, Karachi
Umpires: Ghaffar Kazmi and Irfan Dilshad

- Federally Administered Tribal Areas won the toss and elected to field.
- Sheraz Ali (Karachi Whites) made his first-class debut.

7–10 December 2015
Scorecard

Lahore Whites	v	Rawalpindi
201 (74.2 overs); Sami Aslam 55 (166); Haseeb Azam 6/74 (24 overs)		183 (56.3 overs); Sarmad Hameed 39 (68); Asif Raza 5/74 (26.3 overs)
107 (51.2 overs); Asif Raza 32 (70); Mansoor Amjad 4/27 (16 overs)		11/2 (3.2 overs); Babar Naeem 8* (10); Asif Raza 2/7 (2 overs)

Match drawn
Lahore City Cricket Association Ground
Umpires: Saqib Khan and Tahir Rasheed

- Rawalpindi won the toss and elected to field.

7–10 December 2015
Scorecard

National Bank of Pakistan	v	Khan Research Laboratories
138 (42.1 overs); Qaiser Abbas 29 (33); Sadaf Hussain 6/45 (16.1 overs)		176 (38.3 overs); Nauman Ali 55 (43); Ahmed Jamal 5/59 (18 overs)
167 (48 overs); Qaiser Abbas 43 (74); Mohammad Abbas 7/68 (23 overs)		130/2 (28.4 overs); Zain Abbas 58 (50); Ahmed Jamal 1/21 (11.4 overs)

Khan Research Laboratories won by 8 wickets
Jinnah Stadium, Sialkot
Umpires: Asif Yaqoob and Sajid Afridi

- Khan Research Laboratories won the toss and elected to field.

== Super Eight stage ==
=== Tables ===
Group I
Team	Pld	W	L	D	Pts
Sui Northern Gas Pipelines Ltd. (Q)	3	2	0	1	22
Water and Power Dev. Auth.	3	1	1	1	11
Lahore Blues	3	1	1	1	9
Khan Research Labs.	3	0	2	1	0

Group II
Team	Pld	W	L	D	Pts
United Bank Ltd. (Q)	3	2	0	1	18
National Bank of Pakistan	3	2	1	0	15
Karachi Whites	3	0	1	2	3
Sui Southern Gas Corp.	3	0	2	1	3

(Q) The top team in each group advanced to the final

Position determined by total points, most matches won, fewest matches lost, followed by adjusted net run rate (matches with no result, i.e. those where both teams did not complete their first innings, were disregarded); matches finishing in a draw were decided on first innings scores, with points awarded as follows:
- Win by an innings = 10 points
- Win having led on first innings = 9 points
- Win having tied or trailed on first innings = 6 points
- Tie having led on first innings = 5 points
- Draw having led on first innings = 3 points
- Draw having tied on first innings, or tie having trailed on first innings = 2 points
- Draw with no result on first innings, or abandoned without a ball bowled = 1 point
- Loss, or draw having trailed on first innings = 0 points

=== Results ===
==== Group 1 ====
14–17 December 2015
Scorecard

Lahore Blues	v	Water and Power Development Authority
511 (159.3 overs); Raza Ali Dar 133 (303); Naseer Akram 4/103 (34 overs)		315 (127.4 overs); Mohammad Saad 56 (170); Haider Ali 5/68 (24.4 overs)
		105/3 (42 overs) f/o Zahid Mansoor 39 (65); Aizaz Cheema 1/20 (7 overs)

Match drawn
National Bank of Pakistan Sports Complex, Karachi
Umpires: Imtiaz Iqbal and Khalid Mahmood

- Lahore Blues won the toss and elected to bat.

14–17 December 2015
Scorecard

Khan Research Laboratories	v	Sui Northern Gas Pipelines Limited
208 (60 overs); Shoaib Ahmed 77 (109); Imran Khalid 4/41 (10 overs)		349 (113 overs); Naeemuddin 108* (192); Sadaf Hussain 4/85 (26 overs)
361 (112.1 overs); Zain Abbas 133 (198); Asad Ali 5/84 (26 overs)		193/8 (33.4 overs); Imran Butt 77 (70); Sadaf Hussain 3/58 (9 overs)

Match drawn
National Stadium, Karachi
Umpires: Sajid Afridi and Zameer Haider

- Sui Northern Gas Pipelines Limited won the toss and elected to field.

20–23 December 2015
Scorecard

Khan Research Laboratories	v	Lahore Blues
158 (58.1 overs); Abdul Rehman Muzammil 60 (107); Aizaz Cheema 5/53 (24.1 overs)		122 (53.5 overs); Fahad-ul-Haq 36 (53); Sadaf Hussain 5/52 (21 overs)
80 (27.1 overs); Nawaz Ahmed 29 (42); Aizaz Cheema 5/28 (12 overs)		119/5 (26.1 overs); Bilawal Iqbal 53 (87); Mohammad Abbas 3/42 (13 overs)

Lahore Blues won by 5 wickets
Niaz Stadium, Hyderabad
Umpires: Majid Hussain and Sajid Afridi

- Lahore Blues won the toss and elected to field.

20–23 December 2015
Scorecard

Water and Power Development Authority	v	SNGP
297 (89.5 overs); Iftikhar Ahmed 77 (100); Azizullah 4/39 (14.5 overs)		310 (108.3 overs); Misbah-ul-Haq 64 (144); Zulfiqar Babar 6/102 (33.3 overs)
236 (82.2 overs); Mohammad Saad 50 (100); Asad Ali 4/54 (23.2 overs)		227/7 (51.5 overs); Mohammad Hafeez 56 (56); Azhar Attari 2/72 (12.5 overs)

Sui Northern Gas Pipelines Limited won by 3 wickets
United Bank Limited Sports Complex, Karachi
Umpires: Asif Yaqoob and Ghaffar Kazmi

- Sui Northern Gas Pipelines Limited won the toss and elected to field.

28–31 December 2015
Scorecard

Water and Power Development Authority	v	Khan Research Laboratories
500/9d (155.5 overs); Atiq-ur-Rehman 144 (270); Saeed Anwar 4/138 (38.5 overs)		116 (49.3 overs); Zain Abbas 55 (138); Rizwan Haider 2/14 (7.3 overs)
		84 (35.2 overs) f/o Usman Arshad 25 (44); Khalid Usman 4/32 (10 overs)

Water and Power Development Authority won by an innings and 300 runs
United Bank Limited Sports Complex, Karachi
Umpires: Imtiaz Iqbal and Riazuddin

- Khan Research Laboratories won the toss and elected to field.

28–31 December 2015
Scorecard

Lahore Blues	v	Sui Northern Gas Pipelines Limited
90 (32.4 overs); Bilawal Iqbal 23 (41); Asad Ali 6/28 (10.4 overs)		512 (133.4 overs); Taufeeq Umar 247 (335); Ahmed Bashir 6/118 (31 overs)
97 (28.1 overs); Bilawal Iqbal 23 (39); Manzoor Khan 4/39 (10 overs)

Sui Northern Gas Pipelines Limited won by an innings and 325 runs
National Stadium, Karachi
Umpires: Asif Yaqoob and Khalid Mahmood

- Sui Northern Gas Pipelines Limited won the toss and elected to field.

==== Group 2 ====
14–17 December 2015
Scorecard

Karachi Whites	v	Sui Southern Gas Corporation
269 (99 overs); Jahid Ali 76 (177); Adnan Ghaus 6/72 (24 overs)		311 (102.1 overs); Asif Zakir 107 (191); Adeel Malik 5/101 (39.1 overs)
323/5d (75.5 overs); Mohammad Waqas 164* (212); Mohammad Irfan 2/59 (15.5 overs)		275/9 (53 overs); Umar Amin 91 (100); Sohaib Khan 4/27 (9 overs)

Match drawn
Niaz Stadium, Hyderabad
Umpires: Majid Hussain and Rashid Riaz

- Sui Southern Gas Corporation won the toss and elected to field.

14–17 December 2015
Scorecard

United Bank Limited	v	National Bank of Pakistan
268 (96.5 overs); Younis Khan 85 (193); Mohammad Asghar 5/72 (27.5 overs)		148 (47 overs); Faheem Ashraf 44 (79); Hammad Azam 4/37 (14 overs)
103 (38.5 overs); Umair Khan 30 (66); Mohammad Asghar 5/28 (8.5 overs)		156 (41.3 overs); Kamran Akmal 57 (54); Hammad Azam 5/39 (16 overs)

United Bank Limited won by 67 runs
United Bank Limited Sports Complex, Karachi
Umpires: Irfan Dilshad and Riazuddin

- United Bank Limited won the toss and elected to bat.

20–23 December 2015
Scorecard

Sui Southern Gas Corporation	v	National Bank of Pakistan
348 (102.4 overs); Umar Amin 169 (179); Ahmed Jamal 3/75 (19 overs)		457 (93.1 overs); Akbar-ur-Rehman 202 (256); Zafar Gohar 4/88 (24.1 overs)
226 (61.1 overs); Asif Zakir 62 (80); Ahmed Jamal 4/78 (18 overs)		118/3 (23.2 overs); Akbar-ur-Rehman 40 (26); Sohail Khan 2/21 (5 overs)

National Bank of Pakistan won by 7 wickets
National Stadium, Karachi
Umpires: Irfan Dilshad and Zameer Haider

- National Bank of Pakistan won the toss and elected to field.

20–23 December 2015
Scorecard

United Bank Limited	v	Karachi Whites
585/7d (131 overs); Younis Khan 197 (262); Ghulam Mudassar 4/160 (31 overs)		597/9 (196 overs); Faisal Iqbal 176 (232); Yasim Murtaza 5/222 (69 overs)

Match drawn
National Bank of Pakistan Sports Complex, Karachi
Umpires: Ahmed Shahab and Rashid Riaz

- United Bank Limited won the toss and elected to bat.

28–31 December 2015
Scorecard

Karachi Whites	v	National Bank of Pakistan
276 (104.4 overs); Majid Khan 83 (257); Mohammad Nawaz 4/32 (13.4 overs)		246 (74.2 overs); Nasir Jamshed 59 (95); Adeel Malik 5/59 (28.2 overs)
131 (57.1 overs); Babar Rehman 33* (97); Mohammad Asghar 5/37 (18 overs)		163/5 (36.2 overs); Qaiser Abbas 34* (31); Babar Rehman 2/31 (5.2 overs)

National Bank of Pakistan won by 5 wickets
National Bank of Pakistan Sports Complex, Karachi
Umpires: Ahmed Shahab and Ghaffar Kazmi

- National Bank of Pakistan won the toss and elected to field.

28–31 December 2015
Scorecard

Sui Southern Gas Corporation	v	United Bank Limited
115 (31.2 overs); Usama Mir 34 (37); Mir Hamza 4/37 (10 overs)		218 (72.1 overs); Gulraiz Sadaf 67 (127); Adnan Ghaus 4/40 (19.1 overs)
232 (62.5 overs); Awais Zia 56 (51); Sadaif Mehdi 3/30 (9 overs)		130/4 (28.5 overs); Umair Khan 42 (58); Tabish Khan 3/46 (13.5 overs)

United Bank Limited won by 6 wickets
Niaz Stadium, Hyderabad
Umpires: Ahsan Raza and Shozab Raza

- Sui Southern Gas Corporation won the toss and elected to bat.

== Final ==
3–7 January 2016
Scorecard

United Bank Limited	v	Sui Northern Gas Pipelines Limited
208 (64 overs); Sharjeel Khan 73 (77); Bilawal Bhatti 3/39 (14 overs)		238 (84.5 overs); Misbah ul Haq 85 (191); Ehsan Adil 4/39 (18.5 overs)
189 (64 overs); Younis Khan 98 (128); Bilawal Bhatti 8/56 (18 overs)		160/4 (52.2 overs); Misbah-ul-Haq 60* (96); Rumman Raees 2/30 (11 overs)

Sui Northern Gas Pipelines Limited won by 6 wickets
Niaz Stadium, Hyderabad
Umpires: Ahmed Shahab and Ahsan Raza
Player of the match: Bilawal Bhatti (Sui Northern Gas Pipelines Limited)

- United Bank Limited won the toss and elected to bat.
- This was the third time the final of the Quaid-e-Azam Trophy was a day-night game.
- Bilawal Bhatti recorded his best figures in first-class cricket with 8 for 56, and his best overall match figures, with 11 for 95.
