= List of Sui Southern Gas Company cricketers =

This is a list of cricketers who have played matches for the Sui Southern Gas Company cricket team.

== Notable players ==
- Imran Abbas
- Maqbool Ahmed
- Rizwan Ahmed
- Ammad Alam
- Umar Amin
- Bilal Asad
- Atiq-uz-Zaman
- Azhar Attari
- Haaris Ayaz
- Kashif Bhatti
- Adnan Ghaus
- Azeem Ghumman
- Zafar Gohar
- Ali Hussain
- Mohammad Irfan
- Ahmed Jamal
- Faizan Khan
- Sohail Khan
- Umer Khan
- Adnan Malik
- Muhammad Masroor
- Saeed Bin Nasir
- Muzammil Nizam
- Rajesh Ramesh
- Mohammad Waqas
- Asif Zakir
- Awais Zia
- Ali Imran Zaidi
