= List of Federally Administered Tribal Areas cricketers =

Federally Administered Tribal Areas cricketers

This is a list of cricketers who have played matches for the Federally Administered Tribal Areas cricket team in Pakistan.

== Notable players ==
- Aamer Yamin
- † Abdul Aziz
- Abdul Rauf
- Adnan Ghaus
- Ahmed Asfandyar
- Ahsan Hafeez
- Asad Afridi
- Asif Afridi
- Asif Ali
- Awais Zia
- Fawad Khan
- Fazal-ur-Rehman
- Hafidullah
- Hasnain Khan
- Hayatullah
- Hussain Talat
- Ibraheem Gul
- Irfanullah Shah
- Khushdil Shah
- Liaqat Ali
- Majid Khan
- Mohammad Naeem
- Mohammad Nisar
- Mohammad Sarwar
- Nabi Gul
- Nisar Afridi
- Razaullah Wazir
- Rehan Afridi
- Rehmatullah
- Saad Altaf
- Saddam Afridi
- Saeed Khan
- Sajjad Hussain
- Saleem Burki
- Samar Gul
- Sameen Gul
- Samiullah
- Sohail Akhtar
- Sohrab Khan
- Wilayat Mohammad
- Yasir Hameed
- Zeeshan Khan
- Zulqarnain
