= List of people from Hyderabad, Sindh =

This is list of notable people who are known for their association with Hyderabad, Pakistan. It does not necessarily mean that they were born in the city or were even nationals of the country.

== Intellectuals ==
- Bherumal Meharchand Advani, writer, poet, researcher and scholar
- Kalyan Bulchand Advani, scholar, writer and educationist
- Nabi Bux Khan Baloch (1917–2011), linguist and author
- Hotchand Molchand Gurbakhshani (1884–1947), writer, scholar and educationist
- Muhammad Ibrahim Joyo (1915–2017), scholar and translator
- K.M. Kundnani (1904–1994), educationist
- Muhammad Siddique Memon, Khan Bahadur (1890–1958), educationist, writer, social leader
- Ghulam Mustafa Khan (1912–2005), researcher, and linguist
- Qabil Ajmeri (1931–1962), recognised as a "senior" poet of Urdu
- Mumtaz Mirza (born 1939) was expert of Sindhi literature, Culture of Sindh
- Mangharam Udharam Malkani (1896–1980) was a renowned Sindhi scholar, critic, writer, playwright, literary historian and professor
- Mirza Kalich Beg (1853–1929), civil servant and author

== Government ==
- Kunwar Naveed Jamil (5th mayor)
- Tayyab Hussain (6th mayor)
- Rizwan Ahmed (last deputy commissioner before LGO 2001)
- Sohail Mashadi (current deputy mayor)

== Politicians ==
- Dr Khalid Maqbool Siddiqui
- L K Advani
- K. R. Malkani (1921–2003), Indian politician. Lieutenant-Governor of Pondicherry (2002–03)
- Jivatram Kripalani (1886–1982), Indian politician and Indian independence activist.
- Syed Qamar Zaman Shah (born 1933), the nephew and son-in-law of Late Syed Miran Mohammad Shah. Senator during the early 1970s.
- Syed Miran Mohammad Shah, speaker of Sindh legislative Assembly, Minister in the Sindh Government, Ambassador of Pakistan to Spain.

== Athletes ==
- Rizwan Ahmed (cricketer, born 1978)
- Abid Ali (cricketer, born 1979)
- Masroor Ali
- Mir Ali (cricketer)
- Faisal Athar
- Mohammad Awais
- Nasir Awais
- Farhan Ayub
- Imran Brohi
- Azeem Ghumman
- Babar Khan (cricketer)
- Sharjeel Khan
- Shoaib Laghari
- Mohammad Waqas (cricketer, born 1987)

== Arts and culture ==
- Bulo C Rani (6 March 1920 – 24 March 1993) was a prominent Indian music director
- Mustafa Qureshi (born 1938) is a film and television actor
- Rubina Qureshi (born 19 October 1940), folk singer
- Zarina Baloch (29 December 1934 - 25 December 2005), folk singer

== Religious leaders ==
- Sadhu T. L. Vaswani (1879–1966), Hindu spiritualist. Founder of the Sadhu Vaswani Mission.
- Saifullah Muhammadi (born 1985), Islamic scholar

== Businessmen ==
- Bhai Pratap Dialdas, Indian businessman, philanthropist and freedom fighter
- Hotchand Gopaldas Advani, businessman and educationist

== Military ==
- Hoshu Sheedi, General of Talpur Mirs' Army, which fought against British in the Battles of Miani and last Battle of Dubbo.

== Sources ==
- Diwan Bherumal Meharchand. "Amilan Jo Ahwal"- 24 March 1919
- Amilan Jo Ahwal (1919) - Translated into English ("A History of the Amils") at www.saibaba-fund.org/sindhis.html
