= Mohammad Waqas =

Mohammad Waqas or Muhammad Waqas is Arabic male name and it can refer to:

- Mohammad Waqas (cricketer, born 1987), Pakistani cricketer
- Mohammad Waqas (cricketer, born 1988), Pakistani cricketer
- Mohammad Waqas (cricketer, born 1990), Pakistani cricketer
- Mohammad Waqas (cricketer, born 1993), Pakistani cricketer
- Muhammad Waqas (field hockey), Pakistani field hockey player
