= Zaib =

Zaib is both a surname and a given name. Notable people with the name include:

== Given name ==
- Zaib Rehman
- Zaib Shaikh
- Zaib Jaffar
- Zaib-un-Nissa
- Zaib un Nisa Awan
- Zaib-un-Nissa Hamidullah

== Surname ==
- Alam Zaib (disambiguation)
- Saif Zaib
- Salman Zaib
- Shah Zaib
