= Saeed Azad =

Pakistani cricketer (born 1964)

Personal information
- Batting: Right-handed
- Bowling: Right-arm medium
- Role: Middle-order batsman
- Relatives: Arshad Laeeq (nephew); Athar Laeeq (nephew)

Career statistics
Competition	ODI
Matches	4
Runs scored	65
Batting average	16.25
100s/50s	0/0
Top score	31
Catches/stumpings	2/-
- Source: , 3 May 2006

Muhammad Saeed Azad (born 14 August 1964) is a Pakistani former cricketer who played four One Day Internationals for the national team in 1995 and 1996. He was born at Karachi.
