= 2019–20 National T20 Cup =

Cricket tournament

- Dates: 13 – 24 October 2019
- Administrator: Pakistan Cricket Board
- Cricket format: Twenty20
- Tournament format(s): Round-robin and Final
- Host: Pakistan
- Champions: Northern (1st title)
- Participants: 6
- Matches: 18
- Player of the series: Mohammad Rizwan
- Most runs: Awais Zia (276)
- Most wickets: Sohail Tanvir (14)
- Official website: www.pcb.com.pk

The 2019–20 National T20 Cup was a Twenty20 domestic cricket competition that was played in Faisalabad, Punjab, Pakistan from 13 to 24 October 2019. Lahore Whites were the defending champions. It was the sixteenth season of the National T20 Cup in Pakistan, and took place during a break in Pakistan's domestic first-class tournament, the 2019–20 Quaid-e-Azam Trophy. The same six teams playing in the Quaid-e-Azam Trophy played in the T20 Cup, with the top four progressing to the semi-finals.

Following the conclusion of the round-robin stage, Northern, Balochistan, Southern Punjab and Khyber Pakhtunkhwa finished in the top four places in the group. Northern were drawn against Khyber Pakhtunkhwa in the first semi-final, while Balochistan drawn against Southern Punjab in the second semi-final.

In the first semi-final, Northern beat Khyber Pakhtunkhwa by three runs. In the second semi-final, Balochistan beat Southern Punjab by three wickets to advance to the final. Northern won the tournament, beating Balochistan by 52 runs in the final. Khyber Pakhtunkhwa's Mohammad Rizwan was named the player of the tournament, for scoring 215 runs and taking six wickets.

== Points table ==
Team	Pld	W	L	T	NR	Pts	NRR
Northern	5	4	1	0	0	8	+1.165
Balochistan	5	3	2	0	0	6	+0.352
Southern Punjab	5	2	2	0	1	5	–0.408
Khyber Pakhtunkhwa	5	2	3	0	0	4	+0.053
Sindh	5	2	3	0	0	4	–1.387
Central Punjab	5	1	3	0	1	3	–0.441

== Fixtures ==
=== Round-robin ===
13 October 2019
Scorecard

Balochistan; 140/9 (20 overs)	v	Khyber Pakhtunkhwa; 141/3 (17.1 overs)
Imam-ul-Haq 70 (51); Mohammad Mohsin 4/17 (4 overs)		Adil Amin 48 (21); Amad Butt 1/21 (2 overs)

Khyber Pakhtunkhwa won by 7 wickets
Iqbal Stadium, Faisalabad
Umpires: Aaley Haider and Ghaffar Kazmi
Player of the match: Mohammad Mohsin (Khyber Pakhtunkhwa)

- Khyber Pakhtunkhwa won the toss and elected to field.
- Akif Javed (Balochistan) made his T20 debut.

13 October 2019
Scorecard

Central Punjab; 188/3 (20 overs)	v	Sindh; 192/7 (19.5 overs)
Babar Azam 102* (59); Mohammad Hasnain 2/32 (4 overs)		Khurram Manzoor 50 (42); Waqas Maqsood 3/32 (4 overs)

Sindh won by 3 wickets
Iqbal Stadium, Faisalabad
Umpires: Abdul Muqeet and Qaiser Waheed
Player of the match: Asad Shafiq (Sindh)

- Central Punjab won the toss and elected to bat.
- Naseem Shah (Central Punjab) made his T20 debut.

14 October 2019
Scorecard

Southern Punjab; 135/9 (20 overs)	v	Northern; 137/5 (19 overs)
Aamer Yamin 33 (20); Sohail Tanvir 3/27 (4 overs)		Umar Amin 50 (41); Zahid Mahmood 2/14 (4 overs)

Northern won by 5 wickets
Iqbal Stadium, Faisalabad
Umpires: Aaley Haider and Mohammad Asif
Player of the match: Asif Ali (Northern)

- Southern Punjab won the toss and elected to bat.

14 October 2019
Scorecard

Balochistan; 233/6 (20 overs)	v	Sindh; 181 (19.4 overs)
Awais Zia 77 (48); Mohammad Hasnain 3/42 (4 overs)		Abid Ali 41 (23); Amad Butt 3/32 (4 overs)

Balochistan won by 52 runs
Iqbal Stadium, Faisalabad
Umpires: Ghaffar Kazmi and Tahir Rasheed
Player of the match: Amad Butt (Balochistan)

- Sindh won the toss and elected to field.
- Waleed Ahmed (Sindh) made his T20 debut.

15 October 2019
Scorecard

Northern; 222/6 (20 overs)	v	Central Punjab; 226/6 (19.5 overs)
Asif Ali 93 (35); Faheem Ashraf 3/44 (4 overs)		Ahmed Shehzad 111* (63); Imad Wasim 3/38 (4 overs)

Central Punjab won by 4 wickets
Iqbal Stadium, Faisalabad
Umpires: Mohammad Asif and Tahir Rasheed
Player of the match: Ahmed Shehzad (Central Punjab)

- Northern won the toss and elected to bat.

15 October 2019
Scorecard

Khyber Pakhtunkhwa; 154/5 (20 overs)	v	Southern Punjab; 155/6 (18.3 overs)
Khushdil Shah 56* (32); Wahab Riaz 3/28 (4 overs)		Saif Badar 49* (35); Mohammad Mohsin 3/37 (4 overs)

Southern Punjab won by 4 wickets
Iqbal Stadium, Faisalabad
Umpires: Ahmed Shahab and Imtiaz Iqbal
Player of the match: Wahab Riaz (Southern Punjab)

- Khyber Pakhtunkhwa won the toss and elected to bat.

16 October 2019
Scorecard

Sindh; 176/6 (20 overs)	v	Khyber Pakhtunkhwa; 162/3 (20 overs)
Ahsan Ali 64 (37); Usman Shinwari 1/23 (4 overs)		Mohammad Rizwan 70 (43); Anwar Ali 3/30 (3 overs)

Sindh won by 8 runs
Iqbal Stadium, Faisalabad
Umpires: Ahmed Shahab and Imtiaz Iqbal
Player of the match: Ahsan Ali (Sindh)

- Khyber Pakhtunkhwa won the toss and elected to field.

16 October 2019
Scorecard

Balochistan; 164/8 (20 overs)	v	Central Punjab; 137/8 (20 overs)
Bismillah Khan 56 (43); Faheem Ashraf 3/33 (4 overs)		Ahmed Shehzad 52 (41); Amad Butt 3/23 (4 overs)

Balochistan won by 27 runs
Iqbal Stadium, Faisalabad
Umpires: Abdul Muqeet and Shozab Raza
Player of the match: Awais Zia (Balochistan)

- Central Punjab won the toss and elected to field.

17 October 2019
Scorecard

Southern Punjab; 144/7 (20 overs)	v	Balochistan; 145/3 (19.3 overs)
Sohaib Maqsood 35 (34); Akif Javed 3/16 (4 overs)		Imam-ul-Haq 51 (39); Zahid Mahmood 2/28 (4 overs)

Balochistan won by 7 wickets
Iqbal Stadium, Faisalabad
Umpires: Mohammad Sajid and Asif Yaqoob
Player of the match: Imam-ul-Haq (Balochistan)

- Balochistan won the toss and elected to field.

17 October 2019
Scorecard

Northern; 191/7 (20 overs)	v	Sindh; 125 (17.4 overs)
Sohail Akhtar 63 (36); Mohammad Hasnain 2/32 (4 overs)		Ahsan Ali 29 (20); Shadab Khan 3/28 (4 overs)

Northern won by 66 runs
Iqbal Stadium, Faisalabad
Umpires: Qaiser Waheed and Shozab Raza
Player of the match: Sohail Akhtar (Northern)

- Northern won the toss and elected to bat.

18 October 2019
Scorecard

Central Punjab	v	Southern Punjab

Match abandoned
Iqbal Stadium, Faisalabad
Umpires: Asif Yaqoob and Zameer Haider

- No toss.
- No play was possible due to a wet outfield.

18 October 2019
Scorecard

Khyber Pakhtunkhwa; 134/8 (16 overs)	v	Northern; 102/3 (11.3 overs)
Mohammad Rizwan 52 (35); Muhammad Musa 4/32 (4 overs)		Umar Amin 39 (28); Junaid Khan 2/13 (2 overs)

Northern won by 7 wickets (D/L method)
Iqbal Stadium, Faisalabad
Umpires: Qaiser Waheed and Khalid Mahmood
Player of the match: Muhammad Musa (Northern)

- Northern won the toss and elected to field.
- Northern were set a revised target of 101 runs from 12 overs due to rain.

21 October 2019
Scorecard

Southern Punjab; 148/9 (20 overs)	v	Sindh; 114 (17.4 overs)
Wahab Riaz 41 (30); Sohail Khan 4/15 (4 overs)		Sarfaraz Ahmed 45 (37); Zahid Mahmood 4/21 (3.3 overs)

Southern Punjab won by 34 runs
Iqbal Stadium, Faisalabad
Umpires: Tariq Rasheed and Mohammad Sajid
Player of the match: Mohammad Hafeez (Southern Punjab)

- Southern Punjab won the toss and elected to bat.

22 October 2019
Scorecard

Central Punjab; 177/3 (20 overs)	v	Khyber Pakhtunkhwa; 182/3 (19.4 overs)
Babar Azam 83 (56); Irfanullah Shah 1/22 (4 overs)		Fakhar Zaman 82* (54); Naseem Shah 1/30 (4 overs)

Khyber Pakhtunkhwa won by 7 wickets
Iqbal Stadium, Faisalabad
Umpires: Zameer Haider and Tariq Rasheed
Player of the match: Khushdil Shah (Khyber Pakhtunkhwa)

- Khyber Pakhtunkhwa won the toss and elected to field.

22 October 2019
Scorecard

Balochistan; 155/8 (20 overs)	v	Northern; 156/3 (17 overs)
Hussain Talat 77* (51); Shadab Khan 4/26 (4 overs)		Ali Imran 65* (37); Umar Gul 1/17 (2 overs)

Northern won by 7 wickets
Iqbal Stadium, Faisalabad
Umpires: Asif Yaqoob and Khalid Mahmood
Player of the match: Ali Imran (Northern)

- Northern won the toss and elected to field.

=== Finals ===
1st Semi-final
23 October 2019
Scorecard

Northern; 148/9 (20 overs)	v	Khyber Pakhtunkhwa; 145/8 (20 overs)
Umar Amin 43 (33); Usman Shinwari 5/13 (4 overs)		Iftikhar Ahmed 53 (45); Haris Rauf 3/26 (3 overs)

Northern won by 3 runs
Iqbal Stadium, Faisalabad
Umpires: Mohammad Sajid and Asif Yaqoob
Player of the match: Haris Rauf (Northern)

- Khyber Pakhtunkhwa won the toss and elected to field.

2nd Semi-final
23 October 2019
Scorecard

Southern Punjab; 173/5 (20 overs)	v	Balochistan; 178/7 (20 overs)
Mohammad Hafeez 65 (41); Ali Shafiq 2/31 (4 overs)		Hussain Talat 42 (29); Wahab Riaz 2/36 (4 overs)

Balochistan won by 3 wickets
Iqbal Stadium, Faisalabad
Umpires: Shozab Raza and Ahsan Raza
Player of the match: Amad Butt (Balochistan)

- Balochistan won the toss and elected to field.

Final
24 October 2019
Scorecard

Northern; 167/5 (20 overs)	v	Balochistan; 115 (18.2 overs)
Umar Amin 60 (38); Amad Butt 2/19 (4 overs)		Imran Farhat 32 (36); Sohail Tanvir 3/27 (4 overs)

Northern won by 52 runs
Iqbal Stadium, Faisalabad
Umpires: Ahmed Shahab and Asif Yaqoob
Player of the match: Umar Amin (Northern)

- Balochistan won the toss and elected to field.
