= Shuja =

Shuja شجاع
- Pronunciation: schuja schu-ja
- Gender: Male

Origin
- Origin: Arabic (Semitic)
- Meaning: Brave, courageous
- Region of origin: Arabia (Middle East)

Shuja (Arabic: شجاع, Urdu: شجاع, Bengali: সুজা) is a surname and male given name.

Notable people with this name include:

- Shuja al-Khwarazmi, was the mother of Abbasid caliph Al-Mutawakkil (r. 847–861)
- Ahmad Shuja Pasha (born 1952), Pakistani general
- Badruddoza Ahmed Shuja, Bangladeshi politician
- Hakim Ahmad Shuja (1893–1969)
- Kashif Shuja (born 1979), Pakistani squash player
- Mian Mujtaba Shuja-ur-Rehman, Pakistani politician
- Shah Shuja (Mughal prince) (1616–1661)
- Shah Shujah Durrani (1785–1842)
- Shakir Shuja Abadi
- Shuja Haider, Pakistani musician
- Shuja Haider (cricketer) (born 1994), Pakistani cricket player
- Shuja Khanzada (1943–2015), Pakistani politician and colonel
- Shuja ud-Din (born 1913), Afghan field hockey player
- Shuja ul Mulk, Pakistani politician
- Shuja ul-Mulk (1881–1936)
- Shuja ul-Mulk Jalala (born 1952), Afghan politician
- Shuja-ud-Daula (1732–1775)
- Shuja-ud-Din Muhammad Khan
- Shuja-ul-Mulk, Pakistani politician
- Usman Shuja, American cricket player
