= Wasif (name) =

Wasif is an Arabic-language name and surname, also spelt as Wasef and Vasif in Turkic and Balkan languages. People with this name include:

== Given name ==
=== Wasif/Wasef ===
- Wasif Ali Mirza (1875–1959), Bengali monarch
- Wasif Ali Wasif (1929–1993), Pakistani teacher, writer, poet and Sufi
- Wasif al-Turki (died 867), Turkic Abbasid general
- Wasef Bakhtari (1943–2023), Afghan poet and literary figure
- Wasif Boutros Ghali (1878–1958), Egyptian writer, diplomat and political figure
- Wasif Hussain Nadeem al-Wajidi (1954–2024), Indian Islamic scholar, columnist, critic and writer
- Wasif Jawhariyyeh (1897–1972), Palestinian musician, poet and chronicler
- Wasif Nawaz (born 1991), Pakistani cricketer

=== Vasif ===
- Vasif Adigozalov (1935–2006), Azerbaijani composer
- Vasif Ahsen-Böre (1924–2008), Finnish ice hockey player
- Vasıf Arzumanov (born 1988), Turkish wrestler
- Vasif Asadov (born 1965), Azerbaijani triple jumper
- Vasif Biçaku (1922–1979), Albanian footballer
- Vasıf Çetinel (1928–2020), Turkish footballer
- Vasıf Çınar (1895–1935), Turkish educator, politician, journalist and diplomat
- Vasif Durarbayli (born 1992), Azerbaijani chess grandmaster
- Vasif Kortun (born 1958), Turkish art curator, writer and educator
- Vasif Talibov (born 1960), Azerbaijani politician

== Middle name ==
=== Wasif ===
- Hafizur Rahman Wasif Dehlavi (1910–1987), Indian Islamic scholar, jurist, literary critic and poet
- Malik Wasif Mazhar Raan, Pakistani politician

=== Vasif ===
- Mehmet Vasıf Pasha Gürcü (died 1865), Ottoman field marshal and administrator
- Mehmet Vasıf Yakut (born 1989), Turkish para taekwondo practitioner
- Mustafa Vasıf Karakol (1880–1931), Ottoman army officer and Turkish politician

== Surname ==
=== Wasif ===
- Ibrahim Wasif (1908–1975), Egyptian weightlifter
- Imaad Wasif (born 1977), Indian musician
- Muhammad ibn Wasif (died 909), Iranian bureaucrat and poet
- Munem Wasif (born 1983), Bangladeshi photographer
- Salih ibn Wasif (died 870), Turkic Abbasid general
- Shahid Wasif (born 1997), Hong Kong cricketer

== See also ==
- Wasif Manzil, building in Murshidabad, India
