= Shoaib Malik =

Pakistani cricketer (born 1982)

- شعیب ملک
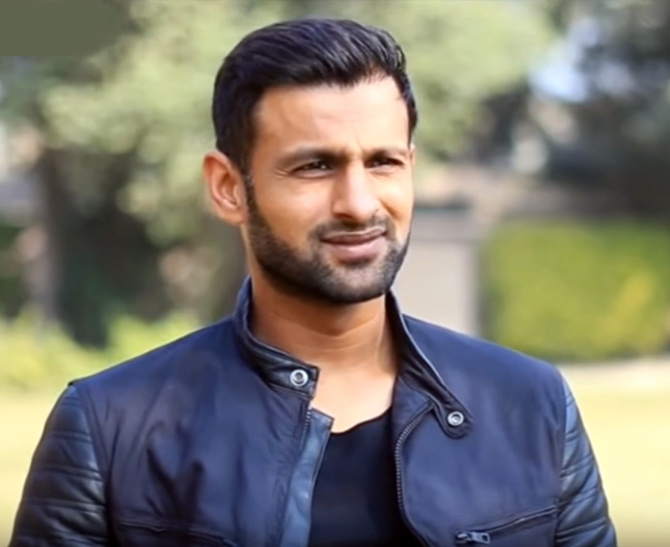
- Shoaib Malik in 2017
- Born: 1 February 1982 (age 44); Sialkot, Punjab, Pakistan
- Spouses: Ayesha Siddiqui (m. 2002; div. 2010) Sania Mirza (m. 2010; div. 2023) Sana Javed (m. 2024)
- Family: Adeel Malik (brother); Mohammad Huraira (nephew)
- Cricket career

Personal information
- Height: 6 ft (183 cm)
- Batting: Right-handed
- Bowling: Right-arm off break
- Role: All-rounder

International information
- National side: Pakistan (1999–2021)
- Test debut (cap 169): 29 August 2001 v Bangladesh
- Last Test: 1 November 2015 v England
- ODI debut (cap 128): 14 October 1999 v West Indies
- Last ODI: 16 June 2019 v India
- ODI shirt no.: 18 (prev. 6, 51)
- T20I debut (cap 10): 28 August 2006 v England
- Last T20I: 20 November 2021 v Bangladesh
- T20I shirt no.: 18 (prev. 6, 51)

Domestic team information
- Years: Team
- 1997/98–1998/99: (Note: Not every team that Shoaib has played for are listed here. Those that he played for in only one season have been omitted)Gujranwala
- 1998/99–2013/14: PIA
- 2001/02–2015/16: Sialkot
- 2003–2004: Gloucestershire
- 2005–2015: Sialkot Stallions
- 2006/07–2018: Punjab
- 2013–2017: Barbados Tridents
- 2013/14–2014/15: Hobart Hurricanes
- 2015, 2017–2019: Comilla Victorians
- 2016–2017; 2023–2024: Karachi Kings
- 2016/17–2017/18: Sui Southern Gas
- 2018–2019: Multan Sultans
- 2018–2019, 2021: Guyana Amazon Warriors
- 2020–2022: Peshawar Zalmi
- 2021/22–2023: Central Punjab
- 2020–2023: Jaffna Kings

Career statistics
Competition	Test	ODI	T20I	FC
Matches	35	287	124 (Note: He has played 1 T20I for ICC World XI against West Indies)	126
Runs scored	1,898	7,534	2,435	6,559
Batting average	35.14	34.50	31.21	37.26
100s/50s	3/8	9/44	0/9	17/30
Top score	245	143	75	245
Balls bowled	2,712	7,928	570	15,149
Wickets	32	158	28	260
Bowling average	47.46	39.20	24.10	28.61
5 wickets in innings	0	0	0	9
10 wickets in match	0	0	0	1
Best bowling	4/33	4/19	2/7	7/81
Catches/stumpings	18/–	96/–	50/–	67/–
- Source: ESPNcricinfo, 6 January 2023

Shoaib Malik (Punjabi, Urdu: شعیب ملک; pronounced [ʃoeːb məlɪk]; born 1 February 1982) is a former Pakistani cricketer who played for the Pakistan national cricket team and previously played for Quetta Gladiators in the Pakistan Super League (PSL). He was the captain of the Pakistan national cricket team from 2007 to 2009. He made his One Day International debut in 1999 against the West Indies and his Test debut in 2001 against Bangladesh. With Pakistan, he won the 2009 World Twenty20 and the 2017 ICC Champions Trophy.

== Early life ==
Malik was born into a middle-class Punjabi Rajput family in Sialkot.

His father Malik Faqueer Hussain, a modest shopkeeper who sold local footwear and supported his son's passion for cricket, died of throat cancer in 2006.

His brother Adeel Malik and nephew Mohammad Huraira are also cricketers.

== Personal life ==
Malik was married in 2002 to Ayesha Siddiqui from Hyderabad, India which ended in divorce on 7 April 2010.

Malik reportedly dated Miss India-turned-actress Sayali Bhagat, whom he met in 2008 when he was supposed to make his Bollywood debut, but they eventually separated when he announced his engagement to Indian tennis player Sania Mirza. Writing in 2008 for CricInfo, Andrew McGlashan called Bhagat his "real-life girlfriend." Both Malik and Bhagat, however, denied such reports, calling them publicity stunts to market their under-production film.

On 12 April 2010 he married Sania Mirza in a traditional Hyderabadi Muslim wedding ceremony at the Taj Krishna Hotel in Hyderabad, India, followed by Pakistani wedding customs. Their walima ceremony was held in Shoaib's native Sialkot, Pakistan. Their wedding received media and online attention worldwide. The couple announced their pregnancy via social media on 23 April 2018. Their first child, a Son, was born on 30 October 2018. In January 2024, Mirza's family announced that she had divorced from Malik a few months prior.

On 19 January 2024, Shoaib married Pakistani TV actress Sana Javed in a private Nikah ceremony at her home in Karachi.

== Early career ==
He first played tape-ball cricket in the streets as a child. He began playing cricket seriously in 1994 when he attended one of Imran Khan's travelling coaching clinics in Sialkot at the age of 12. He began as a batsman, and developed his bowling later. He used to get into trouble with his family for playing cricket, as they wanted him to focus on his education. In 1996, Malik attended trials for the Under-15 World Cup. He was selected for the squad for his bowling.

Impressed by the success of Pakistan's premier off-spinner Saqlain Mushtaq, Shoaib Malik remodelled his bowling action in the late 1990s to reflect Saqlain's technique. He made his first-class debut for Gujranwala in 1997. Former Pakistan batsman Asif Mujtaba was particularly impressed by Malik's abilities and facilitated his move to the PIA (Pakistan International Airlines) domestic team, where he gained exposure alongside established players such as Wasim Akram, Moin Khan, and his idol Saqlain Mushtaq.

== International career ==
In 1999, Malik replaced an injured Saqlain in a domestic one-day match and performed well enough to earn selection for Pakistan's squad for the 1999–2000 Coca-Cola Champions Trophy in Sharjah.

In a One Day International (ODI) match against England in June 2001, Malik suffered a fractured right shoulder after falling awkwardly while attempting to take a catch.

In October 2004, Malik was reported for his bowling action but was eventually cleared later. In the intervening period, Malik was used mainly as a batsman. He was fined Rs10,000 and was also given a one-Test ban by the Pakistan Cricket Board after admitting to deliberately losing a Twenty20 match for the Sialkot Stallions against Karachi Zebras to knock Lahore Eagles out of the 2004–05 ABN-AMRO Twenty-20 Cup. The inquiry concluded that the incident "damaged Pakistan's cricketing image and had shown disrespect to the crowd", but that "his actions were not part of any match-fixing with no financial implications, but were an immature attempt to express his disappointment at earlier decisions in the competition that he felt went against his side". PCB also declared the match void and Karachi Zebras were denied a place in the triangular phase of the ABN Amro Twenty20 Cup despite initially winning their Pool 'B' fixture against Sialkot Stallions.

During his Test career, Malik has batted at 5 different positions and has the unusual record of batting at every position except 11th in ODIs. Pakistan's problems in finding a reliable opening pair have led to Malik being used as an opener in Test and ODI matches. In Test cricket, he made a big impression with his match-saving innings against Sri Lanka in 2006, during which he batted for the whole day and finished with 148 runs not out. His bowling has been effective at times, especially in one-day cricket where his best bowling figures are four wickets for 19 runs (4/19) in addition to many 3-wicket hauls.

On the international stage Malik struggled in England. In 12 ODIs across four tours between 2001 and 2006 he scored 98 runs at an average of 8.16, with just two scores above 20, far below his career ODI average of 34.35. Of players who have played at least eight ODIs in England, Malik's is the furthest below his overall average.

His knock of 128 against India at Centurion in 2009 was later nominated to be one of the Best ODI Batting Performance of the year by ESPNcricinfo.

=== Pakistan captaincy ===
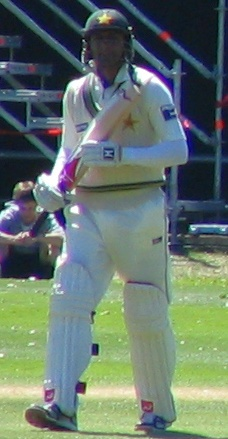
Shoaib Malik playing against New Zealand at Dunedin, 2009

Following Inzamam-ul-Haq's resignation as Pakistan captain after the 2007 World Cup, Malik was put forward as one of the names for the captaincy along with Younis Khan and Mohammad Yousuf. After Younus Khan's rejection, Malik was the popular choice as a younger player and was seen to represent a fresh start after the Inzamam era.

He was named in the 'Team of the Tournament' by ESPNcricinfo for the 2007 T20I World Cup.

Pakistan's coach, Bob Woolmer, was a strong advocate of Malik's case to become captain; in Woolmer's opinion Malik was "the sharpest tactical tack among his group ... a real presence on the field". Former skipper Imran Khan also backed Malik for the role, stating "He appears to have a good cricket brain and could turn out to be a very good choice for Pakistan cricket". Malik was appointed captain on 19 April 2007 by the Pakistan Cricket Board (PCB), his experience considering his relatively young age and consistent performances were cited as other reasons for his appointment. At the age of just 25, he was Pakistan's fourth youngest captain.

In Malik's first series as captain, Pakistan defeated Sri Lanka 2–1 in an ODI series in Abu Dhabi. His next assignments were home Test and ODI series against South Africa, which Pakistan lost 1–0 and 3–2 respectively. 3–2 was the score in favour of India when Pakistan subsequently played an ODI series against their arch-rivals. Malik hit 89 and took three wickets in the final match, which Pakistan won by 31 runs.

Malik's captaincy lasted two years. A report by the coach and manager criticised his leadership, claiming that Malik was "a loner, aloof and involved in his own little world, which is OK but not when the team required a fully committed captain We do not see any meaningful communication between players and captain other than his five-minute talk during the team meeting". Younis Khan took over as captain on 27 January 2009 after a poor performance against Sri Lanka saw Malik step down. In his two-year tenure as captain, Malik led his country in three Tests, losing two and drawing one, and 36 ODIs, of which Pakistan won 24, and 17 T20Is, winning 12.

When Pakistan were touring South Africa in December 2018-February 2019, Sarfraz Ahmed, the current captain banned for under ICC for racist comments on SA player Andile Phehlukwayo, Malik had taken charge for his limited overs till that tour 2 ODIs and 3 T20Is. He also took charge of Pakistan's limited over team in the absence of Sarfraz Ahmed who was rested for the ODI series against Australia March 2019.

=== Post-captaincy ===
In March 2010, Malik was given a one-year ban from the national team by the PCB, who charged him for infighting within the team. It was part of a dramatic cull of players after Pakistan's winless tour of Australia, resulting in the fining or banning of seven players. Two months later Lancashire County Cricket Club approached Malik to play for them during Twenty20 Cup in England and the opportunity to play with a club of Lancashire's reputation was too good to pass up". On 29 May 2010, Malik's ban was overturned and his Rs 2 million fine halved. He was subsequently named in the MSL 2019 squad, and as a result, Malik pulled out of his contract with Lancashire. Pakistan did not make the final of the four-team tournament, and Malik played in two matches, scoring only 47 runs. Mailk was in Pakistan's squad to play Australia and England in England in June–August 2010, but was dropped from the team. A regular in the ODI team, over the previously 12 months he had averaged around 30 with the bat in ODIs, and excluding one score over 50, his batting average hovered around 20. Mohsin Khan, Pakistan's chairman of selectors, cited Malik's poor recent form as the reason for dropping him. After Malik's comeback to international cricket in 2015, he was an integral part of the Pakistan squad who were crowned champions of the ICC Champions Trophy 2017 by defeating arch-rivals India in the final.

In April 2018, he was named in the Rest of the World XI squad for the one-off T20I against the West Indies, to be played at Lord's on 31 May 2018. In August 2018, he was one of thirty-three players to be awarded a central contract for the 2018–19 season by the Pakistan Cricket Board (PCB).

In October 2018, he was named in the squad for the Comilla Victorians team, following the draft for the 2018–19 Bangladesh Premier League.

In April 2019, he was named in Pakistan's squad for the 2019 Cricket World Cup. He had a horrible World Cup campaign, with only 8 runs from 3 matches, with two golden ducks, and took only 1 wicket with the ball, and was even dropped from the team. Following the Cricket World Cup, Shoaib retired from ODI cricket.

In June 2020, he was named in a 29-man squad for Pakistan's tour to England during the COVID-19 pandemic.

He was named in Pakistan's squad for the 2021 ICC T20 World Cup, where he scored the tournament's joint-fastest fifty.

== Domestic and franchise career ==
=== County cricket ===
Malik was approached by Gloucestershire County Cricket Club in July 2003 to act as a replacement for Ian Harvey, who was on international duty with Australia. John Bracewell, the club's director of cricket, commented that he was "excited by the prospect of signing an international spinning all-rounder to replace Ian during the Cheltenham Festival and the C&G semi-finals. He will add a new and refreshing dimension to the squad ... which is in keeping with our playing philosophy to both win and entertain". He sufficiently impressed in two County Championship and three one-day matches that resulted in renewing of his contract for the 2004 season. Mark Alleyne, the club's head coach, remarked that "Shoaib did very well for us last year in the short time he was with us and fitted in very well. He is a gifted all-rounder who is worthy of a place in either discipline and as a 21-year-old, he can only get better and I am really pleased at having him in my squad". Over the course of his two seasons at Gloucestershire, Malik played eight first-class matches, scoring 214 runs at an average of 17.83 with two fifties and taking 15 wickets at an average of 45.06, with best bowling figures of 3/76. He also played twelve one-day matches, scoring 345 runs at an average of 43.12 with three fifties and taking 10 wickets at an average of 47.60, with best bowling figures of 3/28.

=== IPL career ===
Shoaib Malik was signed by Delhi Daredevils, and played in the inaugural season of the IPL. He could only score 52 runs in 7 matches and picked up 2 wickets in the tournament. He did not play in the 2nd edition of IPL (or any edition since then) due to the tense atmosphere after the 2008 Mumbai attacks.

=== Pakistan Super League ===
Shoaib Malik was appointed the captain of the Karachi Kings in the first PSL tournament. Under his captaincy, Karachi Kings only won two matches in the whole tournament which also affected his own performance. In the last match, he handed over the captaincy to Ravi Bopara and appeared as a player in the match. He was retained by the Kings for the second season. He had a much better season, scoring runs in crucial matches and ending the season as the third highest-runs scorer for his team, scoring 202 runs in 10 innings. In the third season, he joined the new PSL franchise Multan Sultans as captain. He led his team well during the first part of the tournament but couldn't maintain the form when it mattered the most, as a result finished the tournament at 5th place. He had a good tournament with the bat as well, scoring 224 runs across 8 innings with a strike rate of 124.44. As a result of the termination of the Multan Sultans franchise before the fourth season of the PSL due to fee-payment issues, the PCB created a new team up for bidding, temporarily named as The Sixth Team, of which Malik was assigned the role of captain. After being demoted from Platinum category to Diamond Category and after being released by Multan Sultans, Shoaib Malik was picked by Peshawar Zalmi in the 2020 Pakistan Super League players draft and played for Zalmi from 2020 Pakistan Super League till 2022 Pakistan Super League representing Peshawar Zalmi as an all-rounder. In 2023 Shoaib Malik was drafted by Karachi Kings where he played the 8th and 9th season of Pakistan Super League. In 2025, Shoaib Malik will play for Quetta Gladiators

Malik announced his retirement from the Pakistan Super League in January 2026. He played a total of 93 matches for different teams including Karachi Kings, Multan Sultans, Peshawar Zalmi, and Quetta Gladiators, scoring 2,350 runs.

=== Caribbean Premier League career ===
Shoaib Malik was part of Barbados Tridents from 2013 to 2017 and played for them in the 1st, 2nd, 3rd, 4th and 5th edition of Caribbean Premier League. He was signed by Guyana Amazon Warriors for the sixth edition of CPL. He was also given the captaincy of Guyana Amazon Warriors. He was retained by the franchise for the seventh edition of CPL. He was supposed to play in the eighth edition of CPL as well but he was named in Pakistan's squad for their tour of England and therefore missed the CPL 2020. In May 2021, he returned to Guyana Amazon Warriors again for the 9th season of Caribbean Premier League.

=== Other leagues ===
In 2013, he was signed by Hobart Hurricanes for the 2013–14 Big Bash League season. He was retained by Hobart Hurricanes for the 2014–15 Big Bash League season. He was also part of the Hobart Hurricanes to participate in the 2014 CLT20.

In 2014, he was signed by Warwickshire for a six-match deal for the 2014 T20 Blast. In June 2019, he was selected to play for the Vancouver Knights franchise team in the 2019 Global T20 Canada tournament. In November 2019, he was selected to play for Rajshahi Royals in the 2019-20 Bangladesh Premier League. In October 2020, he was drafted by the Jaffna Stallions for the inaugural edition of the Lanka Premier League. In November 2021, he was selected to play for the Jaffna Kings following the players' draft for the 2021 Lanka Premier League. In July 2022, he was signed by the Jaffna Kings for the third edition of the Lanka Premier League.

=== BPL career ===
In 2015, Malik played for Comilla Victorians in the third season of Bangladesh Premier League. In 2016, he was signed by Chittagong Vikings for the fourth edition of Bangladesh Premier League. He was drafted back into the squad by Comilla Victorians for the fifth and sixth edition of Bangladesh Premier League. He was then signed by Rajshahi Royals for the seventh edition of the Bangladesh Premier League.

== Playing style ==
=== Batting ===
According to ESPNcricinfo's Osman Samiuddin:

(Malik's) batting repertoire doesn't burst forth with strokes; there remains a distinctly utilitarian appeal to it. His drives straight are generally checked, dispossessed of flourish and in his forward defensive prods, there is an exaggerated care, just to make fully sure. It doesn't mean elegance doesn't come to him, as a couple of cover drives off Anil Kumble and Harbhajan Singh to bring Pakistan nearer its hundred showed. Midwicket slogging also comes naturally to him, usually more effective than beautiful.

— Osman Samiuddin, 2006

Malik is regarded as a flexible player. He is capable of hitting big shots but is also capable of rotating the strike with good placement. He has a strike rate of 80.4 runs per 100 balls, which compares favourably to players such as Rahul Dravid and Inzamam ul-Haq. His most brazen display of "power hitting" came in 2003 against South Africa when he scored 82 from 41 balls. As is required of most modern players, he also has displayed good defensive batting at times.

=== Bowling ===
Malik is primarily an off-break spinner who early in his career modeled his technique on Saqlain Mushtaq, Pakistan's legendary off-spinner. His action, especially in the beginning, was a near mirror of Saqlain's.

In May 2001, Malik's bowling action was inspected. The PCB group of bowling advisers concluded that his stock off-spinner was legal, although his delivery going the other way was not. He was encouraged to concentrate on his off-spin and to practice bowling his other delivery without bending his arm. In October 2004, Malik was reported to the International Cricket Council (ICC) for having a "potentially flawed bowling action"; eight months later, his action was cleared.

=== Fielding ===
Because of his high physical fitness, Malik could field anywhere on the ground. Early in his career, he was inside the 30-yard circle, executing stops and run-outs at point and cover. As his career progressed into the T20 era, he became a premier boundary rider, trusted at long-on, long-off, and deep mid-wicket during the death overs due to his rapid ground coverage. Initially, Wasim Akram had selected him in the national squad in 1999 on the basis of both his bowling and his fielding.

== Post-retirement ==
=== Business ===
In 2021 he turned to entrepreneurship by launching his own signature perfume, All Rounder.

=== Acting ===
He made his acting debut in 2022 with cameo appearances in the webseries Baarwan Khiladi and in the movie Chakkar, and expects to get more seriously involved in the field in the near future.

=== Hosting ===
While he has appeared on different TV shows over the years, mainly as a cricket analyst, in 2022 he himself became a host through ARY Digital's The Ultimate Muqabla, an adventure-action reality game show with the contestants being celebrities performing different thrilling tasks in Thailand.

Later in the same year, through the OTT platform UrduFlix, he launched The Mirza Malik Show, with his wife Sania Mirza as the co-host, where they interview celebrities.

== Television ==
Year	Show	Channel	Role
2022–present	The Ultimate Muqabla	ARY Digital	Host
2023	The Mirza Malik Show	UrduFlix	Host

== Notes ==
Preceded by Inzamam-ul-Haq	Pakistan Cricket Captain; 2007–2009	Succeeded by Younis Khan
