= Laeeq =

Laeeq "لئیق" is a masculine name, which means able, worthy, fit, suitable, capable, decent, intelligent. The word is commonly pronounced as "Lah eek". It has roots in Urdu, Arabic, Ethiopian and Scottish languages. The closest Arabic equivalent of Laeeq/Laiq is "Laeq" "لائق". "Laeeq" is also believed to be an African name. It is commonly considered as an Urdu name. Variants of the name "Laeeq" are also found in Scotland. The English variant forms of the name include: Laike, Laiken, Laikin, Laken, Lake, and Lakon.

From the English word lake, for the inland body of water. It is ultimately derived from Latin "lacus". In English language the name "Lake" or "Layk" is rare.

Notable people with this name include:

- Arshad Laeeq, Pakistani cricketer
- Dr. Laeeq Khan, Academician in the United States

Laeeq is often the first name of people but can also be a surname.
