= Malik Aftab =

Malik Aftab can refer to:

- Malik Aftab (cricketer, born 1982), a Pakistani cricketer
- Malik Aftab (cricketer, born 1996), a Pakistani cricketer
