= Shahid Qambrani =

Pakistani cricketer

Personal information
- Full name: Shahid Ali Qambrani
- Born: 2 February 1978 (age 48); Kotri, Sindh, Pakistan
- Batting: Right-handed
- Bowling: Right-arm medium

Domestic team information
- Years: Team
- 1998-99 to 2011-12: Hyderabad
- 1999-2000: Pakistan National Shipping Corporation
- 2002-03: Dadu
- 2006-07: Pakistan Customs
- 2006-07: Sindh

Career statistics
Competition	FC	List A
Matches	96	44
Runs scored	4620	1433
Batting average	28.69	39.80
100s/50s	8/26	3/9
Top score	150*	112*
Balls bowled	1209	311
Wickets	17	3
Bowling average	40.82	92.00
5 wickets in innings	0	0
10 wickets in match	0	n/a
Best bowling	4/137	1/28
Catches/stumpings	55/–	10/–
- Source: Cricket Archive, 19 June 2014

Shahid Ali Qambrani (born 2 February 1978) is a former Pakistani cricketer who played first-class cricket for several teams in Pakistan from 1998-99 to 2011-12.

== Cricket career ==
Qambrani played several matches for the Pakistan Under-19 team in 1996 and 1997, opening the batting against the Under-19 teams of West Indies, England and South Africa.

He made his first-class debut in 1998-99 for Hyderabad in the Quaid-e-Azam Trophy. In his sixth match, a few days after turning 21, he captained the team for the first time, scored his first century, and led Hyderabad to their first victory of the season by one wicket.

In 2001-02 Qambrani captained Dadu to second place in the sub-first-class Grade II division of the Quaid-e-Azam Trophy. He was the most successful batsman in the tournament. When Dadu were promoted to first-class status for the 2002-03 season, he retained the captaincy, and led the team's batting with 257 runs at 25.70, but Dadu won no matches and lost their first-class status after the season. They won one match in the one-day tournament, in which Qambrani scored 112 not out in a 10-run victory over Lahore Blues and shared the Man of the match award.

Qambrani had his most prolific season in 2006-07 when he scored 686 runs at an average of 32.66, playing for Pakistan Customs, Hyderabad and Sindh. His highest score was 150 not out, scored for Hyderabad against Islamabad in 2009-10. It was the last of his eight first-class centuries. He last played first-class and List A cricket in 2011-12.
