= Munir-ur-Rehman =

Pakistani cricketer (born 1993)

Personal information
- Born: 3 May 1993 (age 33); Islamabad, Pakistan
- Source: ESPNcricinfo, 15 December 2015

Munir-ur-Rehman (born 3 May 1993) is a Pakistani cricketer who plays for Islamabad. He made his first-class debut on 9 November 2015 in the 2015–16 Quaid-e-Azam Trophy.
