= Mohsin Nadeem =

Pakistani cricketer (born 1994)

Personal information
- Born: 11 August 1994 (age 32); Lahore, Pakistan
- Source: Cricinfo, 15 December 2015

Mohsin Nadeem (born 11 August 1994) is a Pakistani cricketer who plays for Lahore. He made his first-class debut on 16 November 2015 in the 2015–16 Quaid-e-Azam Trophy.
