= Maqbool Ahmed =

Pakistani cricketer (born 1992)

Personal information
- Born: 9 December 1992 (age 33); Sahiwal, Punjab, Pakistan
- Batting: Right-handed
- Bowling: Right-arm medium pace
- Role: Wicket-keeper-batsman

Domestic team information
- Years: Team
- 2012–2014: Multan
- 2014–2015: State Bank of Pakistan
- 2016–2019: Sui Southern Gas Company
- 2019–present: Southern Punjab

Career statistics
Competition	FC	LA	T20
Matches	33	29	2
Runs scored	949	316	5
Batting average	29.65	24.30	5
100s/50s	0/8	0/0	0/5
Top score	76*	40	3*
Catches/stumpings	89/14	32/12	0/0
- Source: ESPNcricinfo, 17 January 2020

Maqbool Ahmed (Urdu: مقبول احمد; born 9 December 1992) is a Pakistani wicketkeeper-batsman. He plays for Southern Punjab in domestic cricket. He has played a total of 33 first-class, 29 List A and 2 T20 games for Multan, State Bank of Pakistan and Sui Southern Gas Company.
