= Dadu cricket team =

Cricket team

Dadu was a first-class cricket team from the city of Dadu in the western part of Sindh province in Pakistan. They played one season of first-class and List A cricket in 2002–03.

== Background ==
Dadu finished second to Multan in the second division (non-first-class) of the Quaid-i-Azam Trophy in 2001–02. Their captain, Shahid Qambrani, was the highest scorer in the competition, with 576 runs at an average of 82.28. Dadu and Multan were promoted to the top level of the Trophy for 2002–03.

== First-class matches ==
Dadu lost their first four matches then drew their fifth, finishing last in their group. In their first match, against Public Works Department, their wicket-keeper Wasim Ahmed took 11 catches, equalling the Pakistan record, and Athar Laeeq took 4 for 39 and 6 for 35, which remained Dadu's best innings and match figures. Shahid Qambrani, who again captained the team, was the leading run-scorer, with 257 at 25.70, but Rizwan Ahmed topped the batting averages with 213 runs at 42.60, and also took 13 wickets at 21.00. There were no centuries.

== National Bank of Pakistan Patron's Cup ==
Dadu also took part in the national 50-over List A competition in 2002–03, winning one match and losing four, and finishing last in their six-team group. Abid Baloch captained the team. Shahid Qambrani was again the leading scorer, and also hit the team's only century, 112 not out off 108 balls, in the victory over Lahore Blues.

== Current status ==
Dadu were one of six regional teams that were absorbed by stronger teams for the 2003–04 season. They merged with the neighbouring Hyderabad team.

Since Dadu lost first-class status they have continued to compete in the annual sub-first-class Inter-District Senior Tournament against other teams from the Hyderabad and Larkana regions.

== Grounds ==
Dadu did not play any home games in 2002–03. They now play at the District Cricket Ground, Dadu.

== Notable players ==
- Shahid Qambrani
