= Sajid Afridi =

Pakistani cricketer (born 1969)

Personal information
- Born: 8 April 1969 (age 57); Charsadda, Pakistan
- Source: Cricinfo, 1 November 2015

Sajid Afridi (born 8 April 1969) is a Pakistani former first-class cricketer. He is now an umpire and has stood in matches in the 2015–16 Quaid-e-Azam Trophy.

A right-arm fast medium bowler and right-handed batsman, he played for Peshawar teams in domestic cricket, including in the 1990–91 and 1994–95 editions of Quaid-e-Azam Trophy.
