= Daniyal Zahid =

Pakistani cricketer (born 1994)

Personal information
- Born: 11 March 1994 (age 32); Lahore, Pakistan
- Source: Cricinfo, 15 December 2015

Daniyal Zahid (born 11 March 1994) is a Pakistani cricketer who plays for Lahore. He made his first-class debut on 16 November 2015 in the 2015–16 Quaid-e-Azam Trophy.
