= Jamil Khan =

Pakistani cricketer (born 1991)

Personal information
- Born: 1 October 1991 (age 35); Lahore, Pakistan
- Batting: Left-handed
- Source: Cricinfo, 20 December 2015

Jamil Khan (born 1 October 1991) is a Pakistani cricketer who plays for Lahore. He made his first-class debut on 2 November 2015 in the 2015–16 Quaid-e-Azam Trophy.
