= Sheraz Ali =

Pakistani cricketer (born 1990)

Personal information
- Born: 27 February 1990 (age 36); Karachi, Pakistan
- Source: Cricinfo, 21 December 2015

Sheraz Ali (born 27 February 1990) is a Pakistani cricketer who plays for Karachi. He made his first-class debut on 7 December 2015 in the 2015–16 Quaid-e-Azam Trophy.
