= Faizan Khan (Pakistani cricketer) =

Pakistani cricketer (born 1992)

Personal information
- Full name: Faizan Khan
- Born: 27 August 1992 (age 34); Karachi, Sindh, Pakistan
- Source: Cricinfo, 18 December 2015

Faizan Khan (born 27 August 1992) is a Pakistani cricketer who plays for Sui Southern Gas Company. He made his first-class debut on 30 November 2015 in the 2015–16 Quaid-e-Azam Trophy. He made his Twenty20 debut for the Lahore Qalandars in the 2018 Abu Dhabi T20 Trophy on 4 October 2018.
