= Haris Nazar =

Pakistani cricketer (born 1998)

Personal information
- Born: 10 June 1998 (age 28); Lahore, Pakistan
- Source: Cricinfo, 17 December 2015

Haris Nazar (born 10 June 1998) is a Pakistani cricketer who plays for Lahore. He made his first-class debut on 30 November 2015 in the 2015–16 Quaid-e-Azam Trophy.
