= Anas Mahmood =

Pakistani cricketer (born 1990)

Personal information
- Born: 16 March 1990 (age 36); Karachi, Pakistan
- Source: Cricinfo, 18 December 2015

Anas Mahmood (born 16 March 1990) is a Pakistani cricketer who plays for Lahore. He made his first-class debut on 26 October 2015 in the 2015–16 Quaid-e-Azam Trophy.
