= Mohammad Sohail =

Pakistani cricketer (born 1988)

Personal information
- Born: 25 May 1988 (age 38); Mirpur Khas, Pakistan
- Batting: Right-handed
- Bowling: Right-arm off-break
- Source: Cricinfo, 15 December 2015

Mohammad Sohail (born 25 May 1988) is a Pakistani cricketer who plays for Hyderabad. He made his first-class debut on 26 October 2015 in the 2015–16 Quaid-e-Azam Trophy.
