= Alamzeb =

Alamzeb, Alamzaib, or Alam Zeb may refer to:

- Alamzaib Mahsud, Pashtun human rights activist in Pakistan
- Alamzeb Mujahid, Pashtun comedian living in Singapore
- Alam Zeb (athlete), Pakistani middle-distance runner
- Alamzeb "Alam", a fictional character played by Sharmin Segal in the 2024 Indian television series Heeramandi
  - "Alamzeb: The Innocent Pawn", the fourth episode of the TV series
  - "Tajdar & Alamzeb: Nation vs. Love", the sixth episode of the TV series
