= Ali Imran Zaidi =

Pakistani cricketer (born 1994)

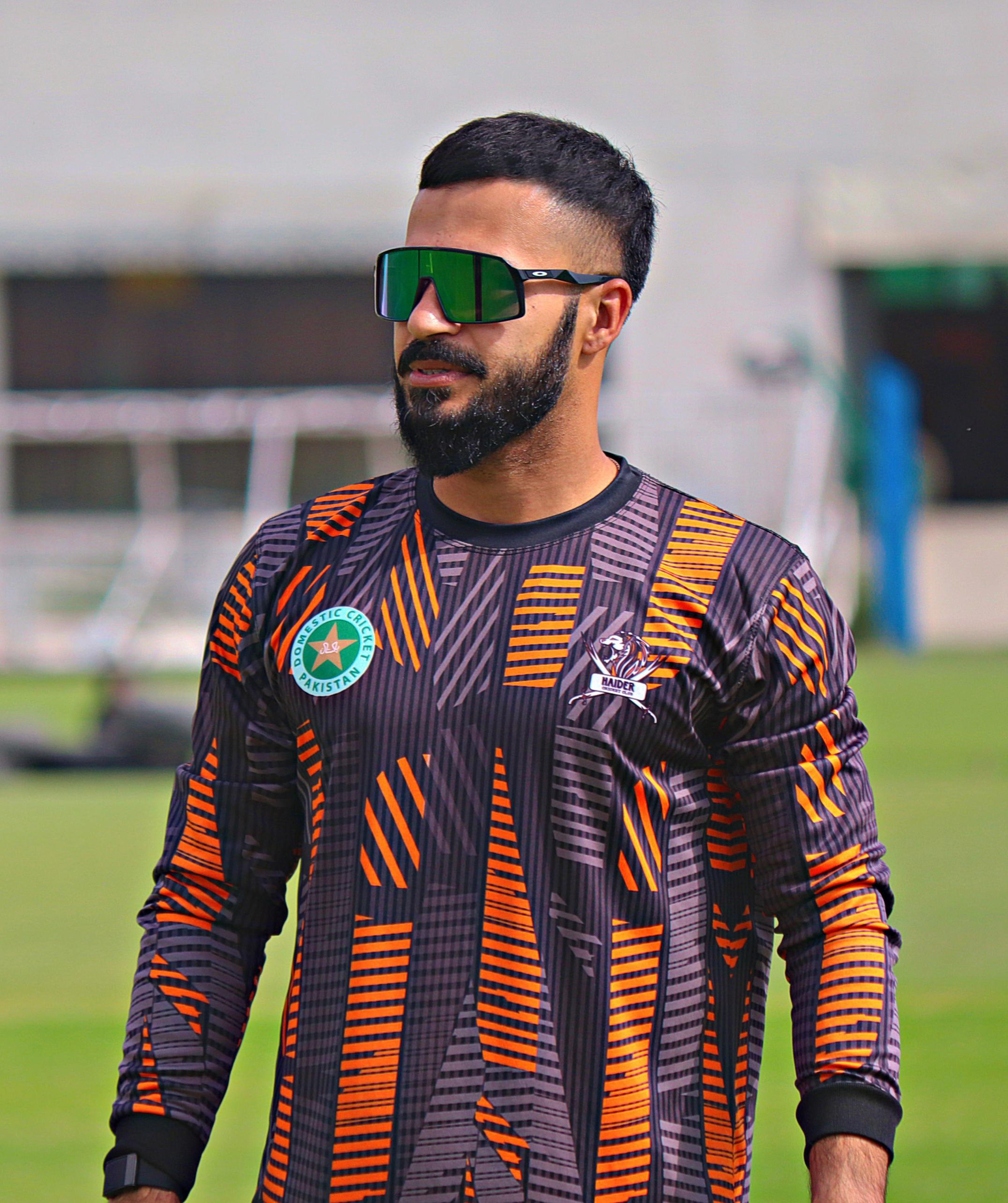

Personal information
- Full name: Ali Imran Zaidi
- Born: 27 September 1994 (age 32); Islamabad, Pakistan
- Height: 5 ft 9 in (175 cm)
- Source: Sportskeeda, 31 January 2023

Ali Imran Zaidi (born 27 September 1994) is a Pakistani professional all-rounder cricketer and businessman. He is a right hand batsman and right arm medium fast bowler. He graduated in International Business Management.

Ali is a professional cricket player who played for both national and international matches. He represented the Pakistan Customs cricket team as a Captain and SSGC cricket team in Quaid-e-Azam Trophy. He also played for the Northern cricket team in Patron's Trophy, Pakistan Cup and National T20 Cup in Pakistan. In 2022, he played for the SGD Club in Sharjah T20 Cup in the UAE. He usually plays wearing the number 14 jersey.

His current teams in the UAE franchise cricket are 11 Ace and Warriors CC. In Pakistan he is leading departmental cricket team Haider CC in President Trophy II 2025 and till date. His achievement in 2024 were in London, England where he played in the Middlesex County Cricket League and ended up been in top 10 run scorers of the league with an average of 54.67. And was seen playing for Comilla Warriors in the NCL Elite Division league. In the Karachi T20 2023 season, he played in both the Bankers T20 Cup and the 8th Corporate T20 Cup, where he was recognized as the leading batsman in each tournament. Alongside his cricket career, he has also been involved in expanding the family business, the Samra Group of Companies, following in the footsteps of his father, Syed Sibte Haider Zaidi.
