= Asif Raza =

Pakistani cricketer

Personal information
- Full name: Asif Raza
- Born: 11 January 1987 (age 39); Lahore, Punjab, Pakistan
- Batting: Left-handed
- Bowling: Right-arm fast-medium
- Role: Bowling all-rounder

Domestic team information
- Years: Team
- 2006/07–2014/15: Lahore Lions
- 2015/16–2016/17: Lahore Whites
- 2019: Kalutara Town Club

Career statistics
Competition	First-class	List A	Twenty20
Matches	64	38	33
Runs scored	1,842	446	313
Batting average	18.05	15.92	18.41
100s/50s	1/3	0/0	0/1
Top score	109	37	53*
Balls bowled	8,852	1,623	399
Wickets	189	41	22
Bowling average	25.47	35.70	20.27
5 wickets in innings	12	0	0
10 wickets in match	1	0	0
Best bowling	8/101	4/45	4/16
Catches/stumpings	17/–	4/–	9/–
- Source: Cricinfo, 14 April 2026

Asif Raza (born 11 January 1987) is a Pakistani former cricketer. Raza was a left-handed batsman who bowled right-arm fast-medium. He was born in Lahore, Punjab.

Raza made his List A debut for Lahore Lions against Abbottabad Rhinos in the ABN-AMRO Cup in March 2006, and made his Twenty20 debut for the Lions against Rawalpindi Rams in December 2006. He made his first-class debut for Lahore Ravi against Islamabad in January 2007. He also represented a number of Lahore regional sides, including Lahore Blues, Lahore Eagles, Lahore Lions and Lahore Whites, and he later also played first-class cricket for Kalutara Town Club in Sri Lanka.

In November 2011, Raza produced what was then the best bowling figures of his first-class career when he took 7 wickets for 40 runs for Lahore Shalimar against Multan in the 2011–12 Quaid-e-Azam Trophy. In February 2014, he made 35 for Lahore Lions in their quarter-final win over Multan Tigers, sharing a sixth-wicket partnership of 82 with Saad Nasim after the side had slipped to 38 for 5. Later that year, he was among the Lahore Lions players called to the training camp ahead of the Champions League T20 qualifying stage in India.

By the 2015/16 season, Raza was playing for Lahore Whites. In November 2015, he made 41 and took 5 wickets for 91 runs against Habib Bank Limited in the 2015–16 Quaid-e-Azam Trophy. The following season, he top-scored with 46 in Lahore Whites' first innings against Rawalpindi and then took 6 wickets for 57 runs in Rawalpindi's reply. He also made 44 for Lahore Blues against Karachi Whites in the 2016–17 National T20 Cup.

Raza later played first-class cricket for Kalutara Town Club in Sri Lanka, his final recorded senior appearances coming in March and April 2019.

Raza played in 64 first-class matches. In these, he has scored 1,842 runs at a batting average of 18.05, making 3 half-centuries and 1 century. His highest score is 109. With the ball, he has taken 189 wickets at a bowling average of 25.47, with best figures of 8/101, and has taken 12 five-wicket hauls and 1 10-wicket match haul.
