= Asif Zakir =

Pakistani cricketer (born 1983)

Personal information
- Born: 1 September 1983 (age 43); Karachi, Pakistan
- Batting: Right handed
- Source: Cricinfo, 1 November 2015

Asif Zakir (born 1 September 1983) is a Pakistani first-class cricketer who plays for Sui Southern Gas Company. He scored the most runs in the 2015–16 Quaid-e-Azam Trophy, with a total of 791 for the tournament. In March 2017, he was named in Pakistan's One Day International (ODI) squad for their series against the West Indies.

In September 2019, he was named in Balochistan's squad for the 2019–20 Quaid-e-Azam Trophy tournament.
