= Arshad Laeeq =

Pakistani cricketer (born 1970)

Personal information
- Born: 28 November 1970 (age 55); Karachi, Sindh, Pakistan
- Batting: Right-handed
- Bowling: Right-arm fast-medium

International information
- National side: UAE (1994-1996)

Career statistics
| Competition | ODI |
|---|---|
| Matches | 6 |
| Runs scored | 101 |
| Batting average | 20.19 |
| 100s/50s | 0/0 |
| Top score | 43* |
| Balls bowled | 198 |
| Wickets | 1 |
| Bowling average | 198.00 |
| 5 wickets in innings | 0 |
| 10 wickets in match | 0 |
| Best bowling | 1/25 |
| Catches/stumpings | 1/– |
- Source: CricInfo, 15 August 2022

Arshad Laeeq (born 28 November 1970), is a Pakistani-born former cricketer who played for the United Arab Emirates national cricket team. He played two first-class cricket games for Pakistan Steel in 1986–87 and was a stand-by selection for Pakistan for the 1988 Youth World Cup. He also represented Pakistan at Under-19 level in a three-day match against India. He emigrated to the UAE in 1989, making his international debut in the ICC Trophy in 1993–94. He went on to play in the 1996 ICC Trophy too. Arshad Laeeq played six One Day International, two in the Pepsi Austral-Asia Cup of 1993–94 in Sharjah, and then four in the 1996 Cricket World Cup. His brother Athar Laeeq and his uncle Saeed Azad were successful cricketers in Pakistani domestic cricket.
