= Saif-ur-Rehman (cricketer, born 1996) =

Pakistani cricketer (born 1996)

Personal information
- Born: 4 October 1996 (age 30); Lahore, Pakistan
- Bowling: Left-arm medium
- Source: ESPNcricinfo, 20 December 2015

Saif-ur-Rehman (born 4 October 1996) is a Pakistani cricketer who plays for Lahore. He made his first-class debut for Lahore Whites against Khan Research Laboratories cricket on 2 November 2015 in the 2015–16 Quaid-e-Azam Trophy.
