= Alamzeb Mujahid =

Pakistani TV actor and director

- Born: February 13, 1971 (age 55); Charsadda, Pakistan
- Education: University of Peshawar
- Height: 5'11

Alamzeb Mujahid is a Pashto language film, stage, TV actor and director from Pakistan. A well known name in the Pashto industry, he remained associated with Pakistan Television for more than twenty years and has done over 250 dramas as well as hundreds of stage and TV plays. Mujahid has a huge fan-following in Pakistan and neighboring Afghanistan. He belongs to Charsadda, KPK and pursued a master's degree in Pashto literature from the University of Peshawar before dropping out. He was kidnapped from Peshawar by unidentified militants in January 2009 and was kept in captivity for almost a week. Soon after his release, he held a press conference to announce his departure from the Pashto film industry. One of his most well-known roles is "Janan", which he played in one of his Pashto comedy dramas. After being a huge hit, people started recognizing and calling him by his character's name "Janan". His other works include Palishe, Sargardan, Palishe part 2, Mast Budha etc. He moved to Malaysia after his release.

Mujahid received PTV Best Actor award along with many others during his career.

One of his famous stage dramas is Abaseen Program, with Nazar Muhammad, where he played different roles in each episode to keep the society aware of certain people in the community.
