= Salman Zaib =

Pakistani cricketer (born 1994)

Personal information
- Born: 2 July 1994 (age 32); Karachi, Pakistan
- Source: Cricinfo, 21 December 2015

Salman Zaib (born 2 July 1994) is a Pakistani cricketer who plays for Karachi. He made his first-class debut on 9 November 2015 in the 2015–16 Quaid-e-Azam Trophy.
