= Athar Laeeq =

Former Pakistani cricketer

Personal information
- Full name: Athar Laeeq Khan
- Born: 10 February 1971 (age 55); Karachi, Sindh, Pakistan
- Batting: Right-handed
- Bowling: Right-arm fast-medium
- Relatives: Arshad Laeeq (brother)

Domestic team information
- Years: Team
- 1989-90 to 2000-01: Karachi
- 1993-94 to 2001-02: National Bank of Pakistan
- 2002-03: Dadu

Career statistics
Competition	FC	List A
Matches	112	80
Runs scored	1623	341
Batting average	15.60	11.36
100s/50s	0/4	0/0
Top score	99	30*
Balls bowled	18,922	3508
Wickets	436	90
Bowling average	21.94	30.06
5 wickets in innings	29	0
10 wickets in match	4	n/a
Best bowling	8/51	4/29
Catches/stumpings	32/–	13/–
- Source: Cricinfo, 27 March 2021

Athar Laeeq Khan (born 10 February 1971) is a former Pakistani cricketer who played 112 matches of first-class cricket for several teams in Pakistan from 1989 to 2003.

Athar Laeeq was a right-arm fast-medium bowler and useful tail-end batsman. He played most of his career with Karachi teams and National Bank of Pakistan, with a few matches for Dadu at the end of his career. He represented Pakistan at under-19 level, and toured Zimbabwe with Pakistan B in 1990 and Sri Lanka with Pakistan A in 1991, but never played for the full Pakistan team.

Laeeq twice took eight wickets in an innings, with best figures of 8 for 51 for Karachi Whites against Gujranwala in 1998–99. He took 3 for 34 and 8 for 65 for Karachi Blues against Rawalpindi A in 1994–95. His best match figures were 11 for 57 (6 for 18 and 5 for 39) for National Bank of Pakistan against Pakistan National Shipping Corporation in 1999–00.

He made his career top score of 99 in a semi-final of Quaid-e-Azam Trophy in 1995–96, when he and Asif Mujtaba added 185 in 187 minutes for the ninth wicket for Karachi Blues against Islamabad. He also took four wickets in the first innings. In the final a week later he top-scored with 46 in Karachi Blues' first innings and took seven wickets in the match as Karachi Blues beat Karachi Whites by 59 runs after trailing on the first innings by 116 runs.

His brother Arshad Laeeq represented the United Arab Emirates.
