= Ahmed Jamal (cricketer) =

Pakistani cricketer (born 1988)

Personal information
- Born: 3 September 1988 (age 38); Abbottabad, Pakistan
- Height: 6 ft 4 in (1.93 m)
- Source: Cricinfo, 25 November 2015

Ahmed Jamal (born 3 September 1988) is a Pakistani first-class cricketer who plays for Sui Southern Gas Company. He is a six foot four inch (193 cm) tall right-arm pace bowler. In October 2017, he took nine wickets for 50 runs for Sui Southern Gas Corporation against Sui Northern Gas Pipelines Limited in the 2017–18 Quaid-e-Azam Trophy, his career-best figures.

Jamal is noted for winning Pakistan’s “King of Speed” competition in 2013, registering a bowling speed of 143 km/h.
