= Afaq Raheem =

Pakistani cricketer (born 1985)

Personal information
- Full name: Afaq Raheem
- Born: 19 October 1985 (age 41); Mirpur, Azad Kashmir, Pakistan
- Batting: Right-handed
- Bowling: Right-arm off break
- Role: Batsman

Domestic team information
- Years: Team
- ZTBL
- 2007–: Islamabad Leopards
- AJKCA

Career statistics
Competition	FC	LA
Matches	75	35
Runs scored	5,018	1,379
Batting average	41.47	45.63
100s/50s	12/23	6/6
Top score	275	119*
Balls bowled	975	342
Wickets	19	11
Bowling average	31.89	24.54
5 wickets in innings	1	0
10 wickets in match	0	0
Best bowling	6/47	4/20
Catches/stumpings	40/–	19/–
- Source: ESPNCricinfo, 11 May 2012

Afaq Raheem (Urdu: آفاق رحيم; born 11 October 1985) is a Pakistani First-class cricketer, who plays as a right-handed batsman. He has represented Zarai Taraqiati Bank Limited, Azad Jammu and Kashmir Cricket Association Under-19s, Khan Research Laboratories; and Islamabad Leopards. He has selected for Test series against Sri Lanka in 2012 season.

In September 2019, he was named in Northern's squad for the 2019–20 Quaid-e-Azam Trophy tournament.
