= Shuja Haider (cricketer) =

Pakistani cricketer (born 1994)

Personal information
- Full name: Shuja Haider
- Born: 31 May 1994 (age 32); Lahore, Pakistan
- Source: ESPNcricinfo, 18 December 2015

Shuja Haider (born 31 May 1994) is a Pakistani cricketer who plays for Lahore. He made his first-class debut on 26 October 2015 in the 2015–16 Quaid-e-Azam Trophy.
