= Qaiser Waheed =

Pakistani cricketer (born 1966)

Personal information
- Born: 15 January 1966 (age 60); Wazirabad, Pakistan
- Source: Cricinfo, 1 November 2015

Qaiser Waheed (born 15 January 1966) is a Pakistani former first-class cricketer. He is now an umpire and has stood in matches in the 2015–16 Quaid-e-Azam Trophy.
