= Haris Khan =

Pakistani cricketer (born 1993)

Personal information
- Born: 29 March 1993 (age 33); Sakrand, Pakistan
- Batting: Left-handed
- Bowling: Slow left arm orthodox

Domestic team information
- Years: Team
- 2013-2015: Hyderabad
- Source: Cricinfo, 18 December 2015

Haris Khan (born 29 March 1993) is a Pakistani cricketer who played in eleven first-class and thirteen List A matches for Hyderabad from 2013 to 2015.
