= Sohrab Khan =

Pakistani cricketer (born 1989)

Personal information
- Born: 3 December 1989 (age 36); Tank, Pakistan
- Batting: Right-handed
- Bowling: Right arm offbreak
- Source: Cricinfo, 21 December 2015

Sohrab Khan (born 1 January 1989) is a Pakistani cricketer who plays for Federally Administered Tribal Areas. He made his first-class debut against WAPDA on 16 November 2015 in the 2015–16 Quaid-e-Azam Trophy.
