= Babar Rehman =

Pakistani cricketer

Personal information
- Full name: Babar Rehman
- Born: 14 August 1984 (age 42); Karachi, Sindh, Pakistan
- Batting: Right-handed
- Bowling: Right-arm fast-medium

Domestic team information
- Years: Team
- Karachi Whites
- Karachi Zebras
- Karachi Port Trust
- Islamabad
- Lahore Whites

Career statistics
Competition	First-class	List A	Twenty20
Matches	60	34	9
Runs scored	1,586	448	67
Batting average	18.65	21.33	13.40
100s/50s	0/3	0/1	0/0
Top score	98	52*	26
Balls bowled	8,372	1,373	162
Wickets	181	33	9
Bowling average	25.55	40.42	27.55
5 wickets in innings	7	0	0
10 wickets in match	1	0	0
Best bowling	6/51	3/34	2/17
Catches/stumpings	12/–	10/–	2/–
- Source: Cricinfo, 13 April 2026

Babar Rehman (born 14 August 1984) is a Pakistani former cricketer who played domestic first-class, List A and Twenty20 cricket in Pakistan. A right-handed batsman and right-arm fast-medium bowler, he was born in Karachi, Sindh.

Rehman made his first-class debut for Karachi Whites against Multan in November 2007. He made his List A debut for Karachi Zebras against National Bank of Pakistan in March 2008, and his Twenty20 debut for Karachi Zebras against Rawalpindi Rams in March 2010. He later also appeared in domestic cricket for Islamabad, Lahore Whites, and Karachi Port Trust.

In the 2013–14 Quaid-e-Azam Trophy, Rehman produced one of the most notable performances of his career when he took 5 for 61 and 6 for 51 for Karachi Whites against Karachi Blues, finishing with match figures of 11 for 112. Later in the same season, he reached 100 wickets in first-class cricket during Karachi Whites' match against Peshawar.

Rehman also featured in club cricket for Tapal C.C. In July 2015, he starred in the Aga Khan Gymkhana Ramazan Cricket Tournament by taking 4 for 19 and then scoring an unbeaten 43 from 20 balls in a one-wicket win over Brothers C.C. Dadu, earning the player-of-the-match award.
