= Adeel Malik =

Pakistani cricketer (born 1985)

Personal information
- Born: 17 October 1985 (age 41); Sialkot, Punjab, Pakistan
- Batting: Right-handed
- Bowling: Right-arm Leg break
- Relatives: Shoaib Malik (brother)

Domestic team information
- Years: Team
- 2015: Essex
- 2002–present: Sialkot Stallions
- 2005–present: Pakistan International Airlines

Career statistics
Competition	FC	LA	T20
Matches	17	28	49
Runs scored	534	677	352
Batting average	18.41	32.23	15.30
100s/50s	–/3	–/4	–/1
Top score	79	70	70*
Balls bowled	791	1,200	680
Wickets	12	22	39
Bowling average	47.75	46.95	19.17
5 wickets in innings	–	–	–
10 wickets in match	–	–	–
Best bowling	3/39	3/39	4/15
Catches/stumpings	15/–	13/–	15/–
- Source: Cricinfo, 5 March 2017

Adeel Malik (born 17 October 1985) is a Pakistani cricketer. Born in Sialkot, Pakistan, Malik bowls right-arm leg break and bats right handed. He represented Essex in the 2015 season and has previously represented Sialkot Stallions and Pakistan International Airlines.

His brother Shoaib Malik is a former captain of the Pakistan cricket team.
