= Haris Ali =

Pakistani cricketer (born 1994)

Personal information
- Full name: Haris Ali
- Born: 27 May 1994 (age 32); Karachi, Pakistan
- Batting: Right-handed
- Bowling: Right-arm medium fast
- Source: Cricinfo, 18 March 2021

Haris Ali (born 27 May 1994) is a Pakistani first-class cricketer who plays for Karachi.
