= Razaullah Wazir =

Pakistani cricketer (born 1993)

Personal information
- Born: 11 March 1993 (age 33); Waziristan, Pakistan
- Batting: Right-handed
- Bowling: Right arm Medium
- Source: Cricinfo, 20 December 2015

Razaullah Wazir (born 11 March 1993) is a Pakistani cricketer who plays for Federally Administered Tribal Areas. He made his first-class debut on 2 November 2015 in the 2015–16 Quaid-e-Azam Trophy.
