= Ibraheem Gul =

Pakistani cricketer (born 1996)

Personal information
- Born: 12 April 1996 (age 30)
- Batting: Left-handed
- Source: Cricinfo, 21 December 2015

Ibraheem Gul (born 12 April 1996) is a Pakistani cricketer who plays for Federally Administered Tribal Areas. He made his first-class debut on 16 November 2015 in the 2015–16 Quaid-e-Azam Trophy.
