= Mohammad Waheed =

Pakistani cricketer (born 1993)

Personal information
- Born: 13 August 1993 (age 33); Lahore, Pakistan
- Batting: Left-handed
- Bowling: Slow left-arm orthodox
- Source: Cricinfo, 21 December 2015

Mohammad Waheed (born 13 August 1993) is a Pakistani first-class cricketer who plays for Lahore. Waheed made his first-class debut for Lahore Lions against PIA on 24 October 2014.
