= Majid Khan (cricketer, born 1989) =

Pakistani cricketer (born 1989)

Personal information
- Born: 3 December 1989 (age 36); Peshawar, Pakistan
- Batting: Left-handed
- Bowling: Slow left-arm orthodox
- Source: Cricinfo, 21 December 2015

Majid Khan (born 3 December 1989) is a Pakistani cricketer who plays for Federally Administered Tribal Areas. He made his first-class debut on 16 November 2015 in the 2015–16 Quaid-e-Azam Trophy.
