= Zeeshan Gul =

Pakistani cricketer (born 1991)

Personal information
- Born: 12 March 1991 (age 35); Tando Bago, Pakistan
- Source: Cricinfo, 24 November 2015

Zeeshan Gul (born 12 March 1991) is a Pakistani first-class cricketer who plays for United Bank Limited.
