= Wasif Nawaz =

Pakistani cricketer (born 1991)

Personal information
- Born: 26 December 1991 (age 34); Nowshehra, Pakistan
- Source: Cricinfo, 16 December 2015

Wasif Nawaz (born 26 December 1991) is a Pakistani cricketer who plays for Peshawar. He made his first-class debut on 16 November 2015 in the 2015–16 Quaid-e-Azam Trophy.
