= Mohammad Waqas (cricketer, born 1988) =

Pakistani cricketer (born 1988)

Personal information
- Born: 31 May 1988 (age 38); Lahore, Pakistan
- Batting: Right-handed
- Bowling: Right-arm offbreak
- Source: Cricinfo, 20 December 2015

Mohammad Waqas (born 31 May 1988) is a Pakistani cricketer who plays for Lahore. He made his first-class debut on 2 November 2015 in the 2015–16 Quaid-e-Azam Trophy.
