= Pakistan Steel cricket team =

Pakistan Steel were a first-class cricket team, sponsored by Pakistan Steel Mills, that played two matches in the BCCP President's Cup in 1986–87.

They drew their first match, against Quetta; their next scheduled match against Sukkur did not take place; and they drew their third match against Karachi Whites. They were the only first-class matches for several of the players, including the captain, Riaz Haider.

They played their matches at Steel Mills Ground in Karachi. They have continued to compete at sub-first-class level, playing at the same ground under its new name of Quaid-e-Azam Park.
