= Samar Gul =

Pakistani cricketer (born 1984)

Personal information
- Born: 24 December 1984 (age 41); Jamrud, Pakistan
- Batting: Right-handed
- Source: Cricinfo, 21 December 2015

Samar Gul (born 24 December 1984) is a Pakistani cricketer who plays for Federally Administered Tribal Areas. He made his first-class debut on 9 November 2015 in the 2015–16 Quaid-e-Azam Trophy.
