= Umair Khan =

Pakistani cricketer (born 1985)

Personal information
- Born: 31 July 1985 (age 41); Kohat, Pakistan
- Source: Cricinfo, 27 October 2019

Umair Khan (born 31 July 1985) is a Pakistani cricketer who plays for United Bank Limited. He has played in more than 100 first-class cricket matches since 2007.
