= Saeed bin Nasir =

Pakistani cricketer (born 1979)

Saeed Bin Nasir
Personal information
- Full name: Saeed Bin Nasir
- Born: 19 December 1979 (age 46); Karachi, Sindh, Pakistan
- Batting: Right-handed
- Bowling: Right-arm off break
- Role: Batsman

Domestic team information
- Years: Team
- 1997/98–2012/13: Karachi Whites
- 1998/99–2010/11: Karachi Blues
- 1999/00–2006/07: Khan Research Laboratories
- 2003/04: Karachi
- 2004/05–2012/13: Karachi Zebras
- 2007/08–2009/10: Sui Southern Gas Company
- 2007/08–2008/09: Baluchistan
- 2010/11–2012/13: Karachi Dolphins
- 2011/12: Sindh
- 2013/14–2016/17: United Bank Limited
- 2018/19: Pakistan Television
- 2019/20: Sri Lanka Ports Authority Cricket Club

Career statistics
Competition	First-class	List A	Twenty20
Matches	191	112	4
Runs scored	11,025	3,968	62
Batting average	39.09	43.60	15.50
100s/50s	26/53	6/23	0/0
Top score	251*	186*	27
Balls bowled	1,941	273	–
Wickets	20	4	–
Bowling average	60.50	64.00	–
5 wickets in innings	0	0	–
10 wickets in match	0	–	–
Best bowling	3/17	1/2	–
Catches/stumpings	137/–	35/–	0/–
- Source: Cricinfo, 3 May 2026

Saeed Bin Nasir (born 19 December 1979) is a Pakistani cricketer who played first-class cricket and List A cricket for several Pakistani domestic sides. A right-handed middle-order batsman and occasional right-arm off break bowler, he was born in Karachi, Sindh. He represented Pakistan Under-19s and Pakistan A, and played senior domestic cricket for Karachi Whites, Karachi Blues, Khan Research Laboratories, Sui Southern Gas Company, Baluchistan, Sindh, United Bank Limited, Pakistan Television and Sri Lanka Ports Authority Cricket Club.

Bin Nasir was included in the squad for a Test series against Bangladesh in 2003–04 but did not play a Test.

== Career ==
Bin Nasir began his first-class career for Karachi Whites in the 1997–98 season and made his List A debut in 1998–99. He also appeared for Pakistan A during the 2002–03 season; in January 2003, he scored 33 for Pakistan A against an Emirates Cricket Board XI at Dubai. Later in 2003, he was named in Pakistan's Test squad for the home series against Bangladesh, one of several uncapped players chosen in a rebuilding side following the 2003 Cricket World Cup, but he did not play a Test match.

One of Bin Nasir's early first-class centuries came in February 2002, when he made 105 for Karachi Whites against Hyderabad in the Quaid-e-Azam Trophy at the Niaz Stadium, his second century of that championship. In March 2003, playing for Khan Research Laboratories against Sialkot in the NBP One-day Patron's Cup at the Saga Ground, Sialkot, he made an unbeaten 186 from 130 balls, hitting 25 fours and six sixes and sharing a 248-run third-wicket partnership with Misbah-ul-Haq. The innings remained his highest score in List A cricket.

In March 2008, Bin Nasir scored centuries in both innings for Baluchistan against NWFP in the Pentangular Cup at the Arbab Niaz Stadium, making 149 not out in the first innings and 118 not out in the second. Later that year, in another Pentangular Cup match against Punjab at the Gaddafi Stadium, he made 119 in Baluchistan's second innings after they had followed on, helping the side save the match.

Bin Nasir's highest first-class score came in November 2011, when he made 251 not out for Karachi Whites against Multan in the Quaid-e-Azam Trophy Division Two at the NBP Sports Complex in Karachi. He struck 35 fours in a 556-minute innings and shared an unbroken eighth-wicket stand of 192 with Mansoor Ahmed as Karachi Whites declared on 440 for 7. In November 2014, he scored his 23rd first-class century, making 118 not out as United Bank Limited took control against Lahore Lions at the Marghazar Cricket Ground in Islamabad.

Outside Pakistan, Bin Nasir played league cricket in England. He spent a decade with Pilsey in the Derbyshire County Cricket League, scoring 10,266 league runs at an average of 98.71, including 33 centuries, and later played for Marske, Castle Eden and Darwen. In 2019–20, he returned to first-class cricket in Sri Lanka for Sri Lanka Ports Authority Cricket Club, scoring two centuries and 424 runs at an average of 42.40.

Across his senior career, Bin Nasir scored 11,025 runs in 191 first-class matches at an average of 39.09, including 26 centuries and 53 half-centuries, and 3,968 runs in 112 List A matches at an average of 43.60, including six centuries and 23 half-centuries. He was used only occasionally as a bowler and took 20 first-class wickets and four List A wickets.
