= Sajjad Hussain (Pakistani cricketer) =

Pakistani cricketer (born 1986)

Personal information
- Born: 1 September 1986 (age 40); Multan, Pakistan
- Batting: Right-handed
- Bowling: Right arm Fast medium
- Source: Cricinfo, 1 November 2015

Sajjad Hussain (born 1 September 1986) is a Pakistani first-class cricketer who plays for Hyderabad.
