= Mohammad Waqas (cricketer, born 1993) =

Pakistani cricketer (born 1993)

Personal information
- Born: 10 June 1993 (age 33); Lahore, Pakistan
- Source: Cricinfo, 1 November 2015

Mohammad Waqas (born 10 June 1993) is a Pakistani first-class cricketer who plays for Lahore.
