= Fawad Khan (cricketer) =

Pakistani cricketer (born 1986)

Personal information
- Full name: Fawad Ahmed Khan
- Born: 20 November 1986 (age 39); Bannu, Pakistan
- Batting: Right-handed
- Role: Wicketkeeper
- Source: Cricinfo, 24 October 2019

Fawad Khan (born 20 November 1986) is a Pakistani first-class cricketer.
