= Saad Altaf =

Pakistani cricketer (born 1983)

Personal information
- Born: 25 December 1983 (age 42); Margala, Pakistan
- Batting: Right-handed
- Bowling: Left-arm medium fast
- Source: Cricinfo, 8 November 2015

Saad Altaf (born 25 December 1983) is a Pakistani first-class cricketer who has played for several domestic teams in Pakistan. In November 2017, bowling for Rawalpindi, he took 8 wickets for 62 runs in the first innings and 8 wickets for 79 runs in the second innings against Federally Administered Tribal Areas in the 2017–18 Quaid-e-Azam Trophy. His match figures of 16 wickets for 141 runs were the best in a first-class match in Pakistan.

He was the joint-leading wicket-taker for Rawalpindi in the 2018–19 Quaid-e-Azam Trophy, with 32 dismissals in seven matches.
