= Azeem Ghumman =

Pakistani cricketer (born 1991)

Personal information
- Full name: Muhammad Azeem Ghumman
- Born: 24 January 1991 (age 35); Hyderabad, Sindh, Pakistan
- Batting: Right-handed
- Bowling: Right-Arm leg spin
- Role: Batsman

Domestic team information
- Years: Team
- 2007: Hyderabad Hawks
- 2009-2010: SSGC
- 2010-2012: SNGPL
- 2013: Sylhet Royals
- 2015-2017: HBL
- 2017-2018: KRL
- 2019-2022: Balochistan
- 2023-present: Faisalabad
- 2023-present: Ghani Glass

Career statistics
Competition	FC	LA	T20
Matches	110	51	36
Runs scored	5,557	1305	799
Batting average	28.79	25.58	24.96
100s/50s	10/23	2/6	0/5
Top score	199	133	74
Balls bowled	234	192	72
Wickets	1	3	5
Bowling average	207.00	63.33	18.00
5 wickets in innings	0	0	0
10 wickets in match	0	0	0
Best bowling	1/15	1/9	3/29
Catches/stumpings	61/–	17/–	5/0
Medal record
Representing Pakistan
Men's Cricket
Asian Games
Bronze medal – third place	2010 Guangzhou	Team
- Source: CricInfo, 26 April 2025

Azeem Ghumman (Urdu: عظیم گھمن) (born 24 January 1991) is a Pakistani cricketer. He is a right-handed batsman, who also played for the Pakistan Under-19 team.

He has plenty of experience for a first-class cricketer, having played 19 games before Captaining Pakistan Under-19 World Cup 2010 in New Zealand where they played the finals. The highlight of his career before the tournament had been a sparkling 199 for Hyderabad, he was also the highest run-getter against Zimbabwe Under-19 in a one-day series, scoring 248 runs at an average of 41.33. He also led Pakistan A to the Sri Lanka tour between August 20 and September 18.

He was named captain of the Pakistan Under-19 team for a tri-series in Sri Lanka involving the hosts and Bangladesh

He also was a member of the Bronze-Medal team at the 2010 Asian games in Guangzhou, China.

He has played in the 2005/06 Pentangular Cup tournament for the National Bank of Pakistan, who were the champions.

He also was a part of the Pakistan under 23 squad for ACC Emerging Cup 2013 Singapore, where Pakistan lost to India and became runner up.

In September 2019, he was named in Balochistan's squad for the 2019–20 Quaid-e-Azam Trophy tournament.

In Cricket Association Championship Season 2021–22, Balochistan's Azeem Ghumman topped batting chart with 890 runs.

Recently he played Quaid-e-Azam Trophy 2023-2024 for Faisalabad region as a guest player and President's Trophy 2023-24 for Ghani Glass Cricket Team.

His father, Shahnawaz Ghumman, was a film star, who acted in more than 200 movies and was killed on 25 June 1991 for political reasons.
