= Shoaib Laghari =

Pakistani cricketer (born 1986)

Personal information
- Born: 21 March 1986 (age 40); Hyderabad, Sindh, Pakistan
- Source: Cricinfo, 27 September 2015

Shoaib Laghari (born 21 March 1986) is a Pakistani first-class cricketer.
