= Awais Zia =

Pakistani cricketer

Awais Zia اويس ضياء
Personal information
- Full name: Awais Zia
- Born: 1 September 1986 (age 40); Bhown, Chakwal, Punjab, Pakistan
- Height: 5 ft 11 in (1.80 m)
- Batting: Left-handed
- Bowling: Right-arm off break
- Role: Batsman

International information
- National side: Pakistan (2012–2014)
- T20I debut (cap 45): 23 February 2012 v England
- Last T20I: 4 December 2014 v New Zealand

Domestic team information
- Years: Team
- 2007–2016: Rawalpindi
- 2019–present: Karachi Kings
- 2019–present: Balochistan
- 2021-present: Austin Athletics

Career statistics
Competition	T20I	FC	LA	T20
Matches	5	82	70	62
Runs scored	70	4,981	2,256	1,258
Batting average	14.00	39.22	34.70	21.32
100s/50s	0/0	7/28	5/12	1/6
Top score	23	232	134	100*
Balls bowled	–	1182	420	212
Wickets	–	7	8	8
Bowling average	–	86.71	52.12	30.50
5 wickets in innings	–	0	0	0
10 wickets in match	–	0	0	0
Best bowling	–	2/30	2/20	2/17
Catches/stumpings	0/–	69/–	29/–	23/–
- Source: ESPNCricinfo, 17 February 2018

Awais Zia (Urdu: اويس ضياء; born 1 September 1986) is a Pakistani former cricketer. He is primarily a left-handed batsman and right arm off spin bowler. Zia plays as a middle-order batsman in the first-class format and as an opener in Twenty20 cricket.

== Domestic and franchise career ==
As a youngster, Zia got introduced to the game playing street cricket in his village of Bhaun, before playing club cricket in Chakwal. Zia was encouraged to attend local trials, where he came to the attention of Jhelum coaches, who offered him a place in the Jhelum team. He accepted their offer and started playing for Jhelum district and then Grade 2 cricket, before finally getting his chance in first-class cricket for the Rawalpindi cricket team in 2007.

He has played 35 first-class and 19 list-A matches. He has also played 22 Twenty20 matches representing the Rawalpindi Rams, who made it to the final of the Faysal Bank T-20 Cup in 2011 where Awais delivered a fitting start to their chase of 181 – it ended in a 10-run defeat, but Awais smashed 32 in just 13 balls while opening the batting.

In April 2018, he was named in Federal Areas' squad for the 2018 Pakistan Cup. He was the leading run-scorer for Sui Southern Gas Company in the 2018–19 Quaid-e-Azam One Day Cup with 396 runs in seven matches. In March 2019, he was named in Baluchistan's squad for the 2019 Pakistan Cup. In October 2019, he was the leading run-scorer in the 2019–20 National T20 Cup, with 276 runs in seven matches. In January 2021, he was named in Balochistan's squad for the 2020–21 Pakistan Cup.

In June 2021, he was selected to take part in the Minor League Cricket tournament in the United States following the players' draft.

== International career ==
Awais Zia was selected for the Pakistan national cricket team squad in the ODI and T20I series against England in 2012. He played all three T20I matches against the England cricket team, scoring 47 runs with a best of 23. He had shown glimpses of the hitting ability that brought him to the attention of the national selectors. Pakistan went on to lose the series 1–2.
