= Adnan Ghaus =

Pakistani cricketer (born 1990)

Personal information
- Born: 27 November 1990 (age 35); Pakistan
- Source: Cricinfo, 17 December 2015

Adnan Ghaus (born 27 November 1990) is a Pakistani first-class cricketer who plays for Sui Southern Gas Company. He made his Twenty20 debut for Rawalpindi in the 2017–18 National T20 Cup on 21 November 2017.
