= Malik Aftab (Lahore cricketer) =

Pakistani cricketer (born 1996)

Personal information
- Full name: Malik Aftab
- Born: 24 June 1996 (age 30); Lahore, Pakistan
- Source: Cricinfo, 15 December 2015

Malik Aftab (born 24 June 1996) is a Pakistani first-class cricketer who plays for Lahore.
