= Zeeshan Khan (Khyber Pakhtunkhwa cricketer) =

Pakistani cricketer (born 1992)

Personal information
- Born: 18 October 1992 (age 34); Abbottabad, Pakistan
- Batting: Left-handed
- Bowling: Slow left-arm orthodox
- Source: Cricinfo, 25 November 2015

Zeeshan Khan (born 18 October 1992) is a Pakistani first-class cricketer who plays for Federally Administered Tribal Areas.
