= Rizwan Ahmed (cricketer) =

Pakistani cricketer (born 1978)

Personal information
- Full name: Rizwan Ahmed Farid
- Born: 1 October 1978 (age 48); Hyderabad, Sindh, Pakistan
- Batting: Right-handed
- Bowling: Right-arm leg spin
- Role: All-rounder

International information
- National side: Pakistan
- Only ODI (cap 167): 2 February 2008 v Zimbabwe

Domestic team information
- Years: Team
- 1998–2008: Hyderabad
- 1999–2000: Khan Research Laboratories
- 2002–2003: Dadu

Career statistics
Competition	ODI	FC	LA	T20
Matches	1	71	38	6
Runs scored	–	4,057	1,015	178
Batting average	–	34.97	36.25	44.50
100s/50s	–	7/21	1/3	0/2
Top score	–	149	158	57*
Balls bowled	24	7,725	1,600	66
Wickets	0	123	45	2
Bowling average	–	39.97	29.62	39.00
5 wickets in innings	–	4	0	0
10 wickets in match	–	0	0	0
Best bowling	–	6/88	4/29	2/24
Catches/stumpings	1/–	38/–	16/–	0/–
- Source: CricketArchive, 31 January 2009

Rizwan Ahmed (born 1 October 1978) is a Pakistani former cricketer. He is an all-rounder, batting right-handed and bowling right-arm leg-spin bowler. He is uncle of Nauman Ali and is now based in Pennsylvania, the United States.

Rizwan has played for Hyderabad since his debut in 1999, occasionally also representing Khan Research Laboratories. He made his debut against Zimbabwe in 2008 in the absence of several more senior players. Although his fielding was praised, the Zimbabwean batsmen hit 26 runs from his four overs and he was unable to take a wicket.
