= Mohammad Waqas (cricketer, born 1987) =

Pakistani cricketer (born 1987)

Personal information
- Born: 15 May 1987 (age 39); Hyderabad, Sindh, Pakistan
- Source: Cricinfo, 1 November 2015

Mohammad Waqas (born 15 May 1987) is a Pakistani first-class cricketer who plays for Karachi.
