= Mohammad Waqas (cricketer, born 1990) =

Pakistani cricketer (born 1990)

Personal information
- Born: 14 December 1990 (age 35); Karachi, Pakistan
- Batting: Right-handed
- Role: Wicketkeeper
- Source: Cricinfo, 25 November 2015

Mohammad Waqas (born 14 December 1990) is a Pakistani first-class cricketer who plays for Karachi Blues. Waqas plays as a wicketkeeper batsman.
