= Sui Southern Gas Company cricket team =

Cricket team

Sui Southern Gas Company were a first-class cricket team, sponsored by Sui Southern Gas Company, who played in the Quaid-e-Azam Trophy in Pakistan from 2007–08 to 2009–10, and from 2014–15 to 2018–19. In May 2019, Pakistan's Prime Minister Imran Khan revamped the domestic cricket structure in Pakistan, excluding departmental teams in favour of regional sides, therefore ending the participation of the team. The Pakistan Cricket Board (PCB) was criticised in removing departmental sides, with players voicing their concern to revive the teams.

== Playing record ==
=== 2007-08 to 2009-10 ===
After winning the non-first-class Grade II section of the Patron's Trophy in 2006-07 they were promoted to first-class status.

The team finished seventh out of 11 in Group A of the Quaid-e-Azam Trophy in 2007–08, eighth in 2008–09, and ninth in 2009–10. In total, they played 29 first-class matches, achieving three wins, 11 losses, and 15 draws.

When first-class cricket in Pakistan was restructured, Sui Southern Gas withdrew but continued to compete in Grade II of the Patron's Trophy against other departmental teams. They won the competition in 2013-14 and returned to the top division in 2014–15.

== Notable players ==
Against Water and Power Development Authority in 2007–08, Sohail Khan took 16 wickets for 189, the first time a Pakistan bowler had taken 16 wickets in a match. In 2007-08 Khan was the leading wicket-taker in the competition, with 65 wickets at an average of 18.41. In Sui Southern Gas's first match, which was also his first-class debut, Khan took five wickets in each innings.

The team was captained from 2007–08 to 2009-10 by Saeed Bin Nasir, who was also the highest run-scorer, with 1876 runs at an average of 43.62 with seven centuries.
