= 2016–17 Quaid-e-Azam Trophy =

Cricket tournament

- Dates: 1 October 2016 – 15 December 2016
- Administrator: Pakistan Cricket Board
- Cricket format: First-class
- Tournament format(s): Two round-robin group stages and final
- Host: Pakistan
- Champions: WAPDA (1st title)
- Participants: 16
- Matches: 69
- Most runs: Kamran Akmal (1035)
- Most wickets: Mohammad Abbas (71)
- Official website: www.pcb.com.pk

The 2016–17 Quaid-e-Azam Trophy was the 59th edition of the Quaid-e-Azam Trophy, Pakistan's domestic first-class cricket competition. It was contested by 16 teams representing eight regional associations and eight departments, (Note: The top level of domestic cricket in Pakistan was historically played by teams representing regional cricket associations and departments, which were owned and run by corporations, institutions or government departments.) and ran between 1 October and 15 December 2016.

The format of the competition remained the same as the previous season, with two round-robin group stages and a final. The regions and departments were divided evenly between the two groups for the preliminary group stage, with the four top teams in each advancing to a "Super Eight" group stage; the top team in each of the Super Eight groups contested the final. Ten of the matches, including the two Super Eight fixtures and the final, were played as day/night games, in preparation for Pakistan's tour to Australia in December 2016.

Returning to first-class cricket were Pakistan International Airlines (PIA) and a second Karachi team (Blues) having gained promotion from the Patron's Trophy and Quaid-e-Azam Trophy Grade II competitions respectively; they replaced Port Qasim Authority and Hyderabad, which were relegated at the end of 2015–16. Neither PIA nor Karachi Blues were able to retain their first-class status as both were relegated at the end of the season.

The final was contested between Habib Bank Limited and Water and Power Development Authority (WAPDA). The match finished in a draw, with WAPDA declared as the winners of the tournament, because of a first-innings lead. This was WAPDA's first title in the Quaid-e-Azam Trophy. Salman Butt was the man of the match in the final after scoring a century in both innings.

== Group stage ==
=== Tables ===
Pool A
Team	Pld	W	L	D	Pts
Water and Power Development Authority (Q)	7	5	1	1	46
United Bank Limited (Q)	7	3	1	3	36
Sui Southern Gas Corporation (Q)	7	2	0	5	26
Habib Bank Limited (Q)	7	2	2	3	21
Islamabad	7	2	3	2	21
Lahore Blues	7	2	3	2	19
Peshawar	7	1	2	4	9
Karachi Blues	7	0	5	2	0

Pool B
Team	Pld	W	L	D	Pts
Khan Research Laboratories (Q)	7	4	0	3	45
Sui Northern Gas Pipelines (Q)	7	4	2	1	36
National Bank of Pakistan (Q)	7	3	0	4	29
Karachi Whites (Q)	7	3	2	2	27
Federally Administered Tribal Areas	7	3	2	2	24
Rawalpindi	7	1	4	2	15
Lahore Whites	7	1	4	2	9
Pakistan International Airlines	7	1	6	0	9

(Q) The top four teams in each group advanced to the Super Eight stage

Position determined by total points, most matches won, fewest matches lost, followed by adjusted net run rate (matches with no result, i.e. those where both teams did not complete their first innings, were disregarded); matches finishing in a draw were decided on first innings scores, with points awarded as follows:
- Win by an innings = 10 points
- Win having led on first innings = 9 points
- Win having tied or trailed on first innings = 6 points
- Tie having led on first innings = 5 points
- Draw having led on first innings = 3 points
- Draw having tied on first innings, or tie having trailed on first innings = 2 points
- Draw with no result on first innings, or abandoned without a ball bowled = 1 point
- Loss, or draw having trailed on first innings = 0 points

=== Results ===
==== Pool A ====
===== Round 1 =====
1–4 October
Scorecard

WAPDA	v	Lahore Blues
330 (93 overs); Kamran Akmal 115 (159); Bilawal Iqbal 4/71 (22 overs)		140 (59.1 overs); Raza Ali Dar 77* (132); Mohammad Irfan 4/38 (15.1 overs)
		217 (80.2 overs) (f/o); Tayyab Tahir 80 (148); Khalid Usman 8/63 (38.2 overs)

Water and Power Development Authority won by 10 wickets
Lahore City Cricket Association Ground, Lahore
Umpires: Riazuddin and Saqib Khan

- Water and Power Development Authority won the toss and elected to bat.
- Asim Ali and Zain-ul-Hasan (Lahore Blues) both made their first-class debuts.

1–4 October
Scorecard

Habib Bank Limited	v	Peshawar
462/9d (139 overs); Imran Farhat 112 (209); Shahzaib Ahmed 3/156 (44 overs)		239 (45.4 overs); Sahibzada Farhan 86 (112); Amad Butt 4/58 (10 overs)
147/7d (31.2 overs); Azeem Ghumman 59 (78); Shahzaib Ahmed 5/57 (11.2 overs)		307/5 (82.2 overs); Ashfaq Ahmed 119 (136); Abdur Rehman 4/93 (33 overs)

Match drawn
Bugti Stadium, Quetta
Umpires: Aslam Bareach and Khalid Mahmood

- Peshawar won the toss and elected to field.
- Sahibzada Farhan (Peshawar) made his first-class debut.

1–4 October
Scorecard

Islamabad	v	Sui Southern Gas Corporation
417 (139.5 overs); Shahid Yousuf 102 (174); Ahmed Jamal 6/86 (23 overs)		328 (110.1 overs); Adil Amin 90 (159); Shehzad Azam 5/93 (25 overs)
275/2 (76 overs); Afaq Raheem 121* (231); Zia-ul-Haq 2/47 (14 overs)

Match drawn
Diamond Club Ground, Islamabad
Umpires: Rashid Riaz and Tahir Shah

- Sui Southern Gas Corporation won the toss and elected to field.

1–4 October (D/N)
Scorecard

Karachi Blues	v	United Bank Limited
111 (44.3 overs); Mohammad Waqas 33 (67); Yasim Murtaza 3/18 (10 overs)		285 (93.4 overs); Umair Khan 101* (272); Mohammad Sami 3/70 (22 overs)
702/7 (198.4 overs); Khurram Manzoor 250 (340); Yasim Murtaza 5/213 (63.4 overs)

Match drawn
National Stadium, Karachi
Umpires: Mohammad Asif and Waleed Yaqub

- Karachi Blues won the toss and elected to bat.

===== Round 2 =====
7–10 October
Scorecard

United Bank Limited	v	Lahore Blues
448 (123.3 overs); Umar Siddiq 185 (317); Agha Salman 3/78 (22 overs)		277 (107 overs); Waqas Saleem 106 (226); Rumman Raees 4/42 (23 overs)
		294/3 (87 overs) (f/o); Zain-ul-Hasan 113* (221); Sharjeel Khan 1/27 (4 overs)

Match drawn
Gaddafi Stadium, Lahore
Umpires: Majid Hussain and Riazuddin

- Lahore Blues won the toss and elected to field.
- Mohammad Aftab (Lahore Blues) made his first-class debut.

7–10 October
Scorecard

Peshawar	v	Sui Southern Gas Corporation
333 (99.1 overs); Sahibzada Farhan 97 (132); Zafar Gohar 3/60 (22 overs)		462 (126.2 overs); Awais Zia 158 (221); Asif Fawad 6/106 (33.2 overs)
247/6 (103 overs); Ashfaq Ahmed 74 (189); Zafar Gohar 3/96 (40 overs)

Match drawn
Arbab Niaz Stadium, Peshawar
Umpires: Rashid Riaz and Zameer Haider

- Peshawar won the toss and elected to bat.

7–10 October
Scorecard

Islamabad	v	Habib Bank Limited
176 (54.1 overs); Abid Ali 46 (93); Abdur Rehman 3/52 (19 overs)		168 (54 overs); Amad Butt 42 (60); Shehzad Azam 7/49 (21 overs)
145 (30.5 overs); Umar Kiyani 49 (43); Yamin Ahmadzai 3/28 (7 overs)		160/5 (41.3 overs); Imam-ul-Haq 57 (91 overs); Shehzad Azam 2/51 (15.3 overs)

Habib Bank Limited won by 5 wickets
Diamond Club Ground, Islamabad
Umpires: Khalid Mahmood and Tahir Shah

- Islamabad won the toss and elected to bat.

7–10 October
Scorecard

WAPDA	v	Karachi Blues
342 (101.5 overs); Mohammad Saad 106 (264); Abdul Ameer 6/79 (25.5 overs)		192 (67.1 overs); Mohammad Waqas 43 (119); Waqas Maqsood 4/45 (12.1 overs)
223 (61 overs); Ayaz Tasawwar 113 (160); Adeel Malik 7/55 (18 overs)		327 (90.4 overs); Fazal Subhan 81 (117); Waqas Maqsood 5/91 (25 overs)

Water and Power Development Authority won by 46 runs
National Stadium, Karachi
Umpires: Mohammad Asif and Waleed Yaqub

- Karachi Blues won the toss and elected to field.
- Wasim Ahmed (Karachi Blues) made his first-class debut.

===== Round 3 =====
15–18 October
Scorecard

Lahore Blues	v	Sui Southern Gas Corporation
266 (117.4 overs); Waqas Saleem 122 (294); Zafar Gohar 6/80 (48 overs)		423 (114.3 overs); Asif Zakir 128 (252); Saad Nasim 3/72 (18.3 overs)
111 (42 overs); Muhammad Akhlaq 27 (47); Aamer Yamin 6/13 (10 overs)

Sui Southern Gas Corporation won by an innings and 46 runs
Lahore City Cricket Association Ground, Lahore
Umpires: Khalid Mahmood and Riazuddin

- Lahore Blues won the toss and elected to bat.

15–18 October
Scorecard

Peshawar	v	United Bank Limited
311 (90.3 overs); Ashfaq Ahmed 75 (133); Sameen Gul 3/43 (17 overs)		320 (94.2 overs); Hammad Azam 78 (115); Taj Wali 3/82 (25 overs)
109 (30.4 overs); Mehran Ibrahim 33 (54); Sameen Gul 5/40 (11 overs)		103/1 (19.3 overs); Sharjeel Khan 82* (68); Akbar Badshah 1/12 (6.3 overs)

United Bank Limited won by 9 wickets
Arbab Niaz Stadium, Peshawar
Umpires: Tahir Shah and Zameer Haider

- United Bank Limited won the toss and elected to field.

15–18 October
Scorecard

Karachi Blues	v	Habib Bank Limited
157 (57.4 overs); Mohammad Sami 44 (62); Yamin Ahmadzai 4/36 (15 overs)		420/9d (140.3 overs); Rameez Aziz 119* (226); Abdul Ameer 3/116 (39 overs)
286 (75.3 overs); Fazal Subhan 51 (82); Usman Khan 4/79 (21 overs)		24/1 (6.1 overs); Azeem Ghumman 12 (16)

Habib Bank Limited won by 9 wickets
United Bank Limited Sports Complex, Karachi
Umpires: Adnan Rasheed and Mohammad Asif

- Habib Bank Limited won the toss and elected to field.

15–18 October (D/N)
Scorecard

WAPDA	v	Islamabad
504 (142.4 overs); Kamran Akmal 103 (114); Imad Wasim 4/90 (34.4 overs)		156 (55 overs); Shahid Yousuf 55 (116); Waqas Maqsood 5/35 (13 overs)
		248 (80 overs) (f/o); Zohaib Ahmed 56 (122); Khalid Usman 4/64 (28 overs)

Water and Power Development Authority won by an innings and 100 runs
Rawalpindi Cricket Stadium, Rawalpindi
Umpires: Ahmed Shahab and Rashid Riaz

- Water and Power Development Authority won the toss and elected to bat.
- Mohammad Asif (WAPDA) made his return to first-class cricket after being convicted of spot-fixing in 2011, making his first appearance in a domestic match in Pakistan since November 2009.

===== Round 4 =====
22–25 October
Scorecard

Karachi Blues	v	Sui Southern Gas Corporation
206 (84.2 overs); Owais Rehmani 68 (183); Zia-ul-Haq 4/33 (16.2 overs)		424 (118 overs); Asif Zakir 127 (245); Basit Ali 3/120 (30 overs)
448/7 (121.4 overs); Fazal Subhan 149 (206); Zafar Gohar 2/96 (32 overs)

Match drawn
Iqbal Stadium, Faisalabad
Umpires: Adnan Rasheed and Mohammad Asif

- Sui Southern Gas Corporation won the toss and elected to field.

22–25 October
Scorecard

Peshawar	v	WAPDA
273 (93 overs); Israrullah 59 (86); Waqas Maqsood 4/42 (21 overs)		180 (55.4 overs); Kamran Akmal 74 (83); Sajid Khan 5/50 (16.4 overs)
129 (59.2 overs); Jamaluddin 38 (65); Waqas Maqsood 4/28 (15.2 overs)		224/4 (78.2 overs); Kamran Akmal 116* (163); Shah Faisal 1/51 (16 overs)

Water and Power Development Authority won by 6 wickets
Arbab Niaz Stadium, Peshawar
Umpires: Tahir Shah and Zameer Haider

- Water and Power Development Authority won the toss and elected to field.
- Sajid Khan (Peshawar) and Sohaibullah (Water and Power Development Authority) both made their first-class debuts.

22–25 October
Scorecard

Islamabad	v	United Bank Limited
275 (88 overs); Shahid Yousuf 105 (138); Mir Hamza 5/55 (23 overs)		370 (90.4 overs); Shan Masood 93 (182); Sarmad Bhatti 3/49 (12 overs)
142 (44.3 overs); Raheel Majeed 55 (104); Mir Hamza 6/49 (17 overs)		50/3 (8.2 overs); Sharjeel Khan 30* (30); Shehzad Azam 2/29 (4 overs)

United Bank Limited won by 7 wickets
Diamond Club Ground, Islamabad
Umpires: Rashid Riaz and Riazuddin

- Islamabad won the toss and elected to bat.
- Arsal Sheikh and Mohammad Naqash (Islamabad) both made their first-class debuts.

22–25 October
Scorecard

Habib Bank Limited	v	Lahore Blues
170 (63 overs); Umar Gul 33 (62); Mohammad Aftab 3/43 (14 overs)		119 (47.4 overs); Saad Nasim 22 (20); Umar Gul 5/39 (15.4 overs)
116 (51.2 overs); Jamal Anwar 40 (101); Shahid Nawaz 4/30 (13 overs)		169/4 (34.1 overs); Saad Nasim 53* (37); Abdur Rehman 2/32 (10 overs)

Lahore Blues won by 6 wickets
National Stadium, Karachi
Umpires: Aaley Haider and Imtiaz Iqbal

- Lahore Blues won the toss and elected to field.

===== Round 5 =====
28–31 October
Scorecard

Habib Bank Limited	v	Sui Southern Gas Corporation
299 (99 overs); Fakhar Zaman 100 (167); Aamer Yamin 3/57 (25 overs)		235 (90.3 overs); Mohammad Irfan 52 (102); Usman Khan 4/54 (21 overs)
210 (66.1 overs); Fakhar Zaman 98 (147); Mohammad Irfan 5/27 (11.1 overs)		166/5 (43 overs); Fawad Alam 35* (38); Usman Khan 3/41 (10 overs)

Match drawn
Arbab Niaz Stadium, Peshawar
Umpires: Rashid Riaz and Zameer Haider

- Sui Southern Gas Corporation won the toss and elected to field.

29 October–1 November
Scorecard

Karachi Blues	v	Islamabad
254 (83.4 overs); Fazal Subhan 79 (162); Hamza Nadeem 5/67 (25.4 overs)		359 (104.3 overs); Faizan Riaz 68 (93); Adeel Malik 5/77 (30 overs)
267 (108. 2 overs); Jaahid Ali 80 (223); Hamza Nadeem 4/51 (29.2 overs)		163/4 (33.1 overs); Abid Ali 63* (64); Abdul Ameer 2/26 (9.1 overs)

Islamabad won by 6 wickets
National Stadium, Karachi
Umpires: Aslam Bareach and Saqib Khan

- Islamabad won the toss and elected to field.

29 October–1 November
Scorecard

WAPDA	v	United Bank Limited
227 (59 overs); Kamran Akmal 94 (95); Ehsan Adil 3/52 (14 overs)		145 (46.4 overs); Sohaib Maqsood 29 (64); Mohammad Irfan 6/66 (18.4 overs)
243 (75 overs); Salman Butt 57 (84); Mir Hamza 5/103 (31 overs)		305 (102.5 overs); Sohaib Maqsood 56 (47); Azhar Attari 5/101 (30.5 overs)

Water and Power Development Authority won by 20 runs
Jinnah Stadium, Sialkot
Umpires: Aaley Haider and Shozab Raza

- United Bank Limited won the toss and elected to field.

29 October–1 November (D/N)
Scorecard

Lahore Blues	v	Peshawar
533 (151 overs); Agha Salman 155 (237); Sajjad Hussain 3/104 (28 overs)		380 (118 overs); Jamaluddin 104 (130); Bilawal Iqbal 3/118 (34 overs)
170/3 (36 overs); Saad Nasim 46* (49); Taj Wali 2/57 (12 overs)

Match drawn
Gaddafi Stadium, Lahore
Umpires: Majid Hussain and Riazuddin

- Peshawar won the toss and elected to field.

===== Round 6 =====
5–8 November
Scorecard

Habib Bank Limited	v	United Bank Limited
139 (50.2 overs); Faheem Ashraf 29 (35); Sameen Gul 8/44 (14.2 overs)		295 (87.4 overs); Shan Masood 106 (200); Faheem Ashraf 4/79 (21.4 overs)
175 (81.3 overs); Azeem Ghumman 50 (157); Hammad Azam 4/38 (13 overs)		20/0 (11.5 overs); Umair Khan 11* (42)

United Bank Limited won by 10 wickets
Multan Cricket Stadium, Multan
Umpires: Ghaffar Kazmi and Zameer Haider

- Habib Bank Limited won the toss and elected to bat.

5–8 November
Scorecard

Sui Southern Gas Corporation	v	WAPDA
529/8d (125 overs); Asif Zakir 200* (380); Mansoor Amjad 3/46 (11 overs)		332 (111.3 overs); Zahid Mansoor 179* (363); Ahmed Jamal 6/64 (28 overs)
		114 (53.1 overs) (f/o); Bismillah Khan 26 (35); Tariq Haroon 4/55 (25 overs)

Sui Southern Gas Corporation won by an innings and 83 runs
Jinnah Stadium, Sialkot
Umpires: Aaley Haider and Shozab Raza

- Sui Southern Gas Corporation won the toss and elected to bat.

5–8 November
Scorecard

Karachi Blues	v	Lahore Blues
153 (36.4 overs); Adeel Malik 66 (52); Bilawal Iqbal 4/48 (13 overs)		262 (95.1 overs); Fahad-ul-Haq 75 (160); Adeel Malik 5/49 (30 overs)
286 (82.1 overs); Saud Shakeel 73 (114); Shahid Nawaz 3/45 (13 overs)		181/5 (45.1 overs); Agha Salman 107* (126); Adeel Malik 4/55 (22 overs)

Lahore Blues won by 5 wickets
National Stadium, Karachi
Umpires: Aslam Bareach and Saqib Khan

- Lahore Blues won the toss and elected to field.

5–8 November (D/N)
Scorecard

Peshawar	v	Islamabad
472 (124 overs); Israrullah 107 (134); Hasan Ali 4/131 (28 overs)		715/8 (217 overs); Sarmad Bhatti 260 (520); Sajid Khan 3/150 (53 overs)

Match drawn
Rawalpindi Cricket Stadium, Rawalpindi
Umpires: Qaiser Waheed and Tahir Shah

- Peshawar won the toss and elected to bat.
- Sohail Ahmed (Islamabad) made his first-class debut.

===== Round 7 =====
12–15 November
Scorecard

Karachi Blues	v	Peshawar
181 (49 overs); Waqar Anwar 53 (85); Sajjad Hussain 5/67 (15 overs)		184 (61 overs); Sahibzada Farhan 69 (96); Abdul Ameer 5/47 (21 overs)
133 (45.2 overs); Jaahid Ali 48 (100); Sajjad Hussain 7/54 (21.2 overs)		131/1 (27.1 overs); Israrullah 51* (61); Adeel Malik 1/48 (8 overs)

Peshawar won by 9 wickets
Arbab Niaz Stadium, Peshawar
Umpires: Mohammad Asif and Saqib Khan

- Peshawar won the toss and elected to field.

12–15 November
Scorecard

Sui Southern Gas Corporation	v	United Bank Limited
291 (92.1 overs); Fawad Alam 108 (194); Mir Hamza 7/59 (29.1 overs)		551/3 (130 overs); Sohaib Maqsood 222 (212); Tariq Haroon 1/88 (24 overs)

Match drawn
Jinnah Stadium, Sialkot
Umpires: Aaley Haider and Shozab Raza

- United Bank Limited won the toss and elected to field.

12–15 November
Scorecard

WAPDA	v	Habib Bank Limited
361 (120.4 overs); Mohammad Saad 118 (269); Faheem Ashraf 5/123 (32 overs)		269 (114.2 overs); Rameez Aziz 79 (212); Zulfiqar Babar 6/94 (39.2 overs)
90/1 (33 overs); Adnan Raees 57* (94)

Match drawn
Multan Cricket Stadium, Multan
Umpires: Waleed Yaqub and Zameer Haider

- Habib Bank Limited won the toss and elected to field.

12–15 November
Scorecard

Islamabad	v	Lahore Blues
134 (31.1 overs); Faizan Riaz 33 (33); Waqas Ahmed 5/47 (15 overs)		165 (39 overs); Agha Salman 32 (47); Shehzad Azam 5/63 (14 overs)
227 (49.1 overs); Faizan Riaz 122* (115); Waqas Ahmed 5/96 (20 overs)		138 (45.3 overs); Tayyab Tahir 54 (78); Hasan Ali 6/27 (14.3 overs)

Islamabad won by 58 runs
Diamond Club Ground, Islamabad
Umpires: Majid Hussain and Shameem Ansari

- Lahore Blues won the toss and elected to field.
- Ali Imran (Islamabad) made his first-class debut.

==== Pool B ====
===== Round 1 =====
1–4 October
Scorecard

Pakistan International Airlines	v	Karachi Whites
167 (53 overs); Shahid Ilyas 71 (129); Tabish Khan 6/47 (22 overs)		160 (50.3 overs); Behram Khan 68* (162); Ali Imran 7/20 (13.3 overs)
177 (56.4 overs); Shehzar Mohammad 38 (90); Tabish Khan 5/29 (17.4 overs)		185/5 (38 overs); Babar Hussain 48 (64); Anwar Ali 2/43 (8 overs)

Karachi Whites won by 5 wickets
United Bank Limited Sports Complex, Karachi
Umpires: Ghaffar Kazmi

- Karachi Whites won the toss and elected to field.
- Shahid Ilyas (Pakistan International Airlines) made his first-class debut.

1–4 October
Scorecard

Khan Research Laboratories	v	Rawalpindi
175 (67.1 overs); Zulfiqar Jan 46 (100); Abid Hasan 4/40 (17.1 overs)		114 (48 overs); Yasir Hameed 28 (65); Sadaf Hussain 4/50 (22 overs)
181 (64 overs); Abdur Rehman 63* (128); Ataullah 5/53 (24 overs)		194 (70.3 overs); Sohail Tanvir 99 (140); Mohammad Abbas 5/49 (29 overs)

Khan Research Laboratories won by 48 runs
Rawalpindi Cricket Stadium, Rawalpindi
Umpires: Ahmed Shahab and Tahir Rasheed

- Rawalpindi won the toss and elected to field.
- Zeeshan Malik (Rawalpindi) made his first-class debut.

1–4 October
Scorecard

Sui Northern Gas Pipelines Limited	v	FATA
493/7d (113 overs); Iftikhar Ahmed 127 (174); Irfanullah Shah 3/93 (27 overs)		359 (93.5 overs); Khushdil Shah 82 (129); Imran Khalid 4/67 (24.5 overs)
234/4d (30 overs); Mohammad Hafeez 68 (51); Ahmed Asfandyar 3/69 (10 overs)		191 (44.3 overs); Mohammad Sarwar 40 (86); Hussain Talat 3/35 (8 overs)

Sui Northern Gas Pipelines Limited won by 177 runs
Jinnah Stadium, Sialkot

- Federally Administered Tribal Areas won the toss and elected to field.
- Ahmed Asfandyar (Federally Administered Tribal Areas) made his first-class debut.

1–4 October
Scorecard

Lahore Whites	v	National Bank of Pakistan
258 (94.2 overs); Sami Aslam 140 (275); Afaq Ahmed 4/40 (16.2 overs)		324 (125.2 overs); Usman Salahuddin 59 (183); Umaid Asif 3/48 (27 overs)
187 (62.2 overs); Farhan Khan 43 (102); Atif Jabbar 5/56 (20.2 overs)		122/3 (19.4 overs); Naved Sarwar 41* (38); Umaid Asif 2/21 (5 overs)

National Bank of Pakistan won by 7 wickets
Iqbal Stadium, Faisalabad
Umpires: Majid Hussain and Sajid Afridi

- National Bank of Pakistan won the toss and elected to field.

===== Round 2 =====
7–10 October
Scorecard

Karachi Whites	v	National Bank of Pakistan
628/5d (159.3 overs); Hamza Ghanchi 300* (420); Altaf Ahmed 2/67 (12.3 overs)		318 (90.2 overs); Usman Salahuddin 113* (273); Tabish Khan 5/63 (24.2 overs)
		262/3 (74 overs) (f/o); Nasir Jamshed 88 (104); Raza-ul-Hasan 3/111 (30 overs)

Match drawn
National Bank of Pakistan Sports Complex, Karachi
Umpires: Adnan Rasheed and Ghaffar Kazmi

- Karachi Whites won the toss and elected to bat.
- Hamza Ghanchi (Karachi Whites) became the third-youngest Pakistani cricketer to make a triple century in a first-class match.

7–10 October
Scorecard

Khan Research Laboratories	v	FATA
352 (106.2 overs); Saeed Anwar 157 (254); Asif Afridi 5/102 (31.2 overs)		298 (81.3 overs); Fawad Khan 95 (104); Mohammad Abbas 5/79 (24 overs)
310/8d (85.4 overs); Abdur Rehman 101* (161); Asif Afridi 6/102 (29.4 overs)		229/6 (63 overs); Mohammad Sarwar 61 (104); Mohammad Abbas 2/24 (12 overs)

Match drawn
Jinnah Stadium, Sialkot
Umpires: Abdul Muqeet and Asif Yaqoob

- Federally Administered Tribal Areas won the toss and elected to field.
- Saleem Burki (Federally Administered Tribal Areas) made his first-class debut.

7–10 October
Scorecard

Lahore Whites	v	Pakistan International Airlines
365 (95.1 overs); Umar Akmal 74 (85); Tahir Khan 6/101 (26.1 overs)		175 (65.5 overs); Fahad Iqbal 46 (98); Adnan Rasool 4/53 (19.5 overs)
224 (55.3 overs); Umar Akmal 101 (99); Salman Saeed 3/30 (8 overs)		318 (93.3 overs); Fahad Iqbal 64 (109); Umaid Asif 5/55 (19 overs)

Lahore Whites won by 96 runs
Lahore City Cricket Association Ground, Lahore
Umpires: Sajid Afridi and Tahir Rasheed

- Lahore Whites won the toss and elected to bat.
- Obaidullah (Pakistan International Airlines) made his first-class debut.

7–10 October (D/N)
Scorecard

Rawalpindi	v	Sui Northern Gas Pipelines Limited
173 (66.4 overs); Umar Waheed 46 (123); Asad Ali 5/40 (13.4 overs)		137 (49.2 overs); Imran Khalid 46* (64); Abid Hasan 5/40 (15 overs)
317 (80.4 overs); Yasir Hameed 81 (99); Imran Khalid 3/68 (20 overs)		355/6 (123.5 overs); Taufeeq Umar 119 (254); Ataullah 2/115 (33 overs)

Sui Northern Gas Pipelines Limited won by 4 wickets
Rawalpindi Cricket Stadium, Rawalpindi
Umpires: Ahmed Shahab and Qaiser Waheed

- Sui Northern Gas Pipelines Limited won the toss and elected to field.
- Adil Akram (Sui Northern Gas Pipelines Limited) made his first-class debut.

===== Round 3 =====
15–18 October
Scorecard

Khan Research Laboratories	v	Karachi Whites
145 (56.2 overs); Zulfiqar Jan 57* (115); Tabish Khan 3/50 (20 overs)		77 (30.5 overs); Mohammad Hasan 24 (50); Mohammad Abbas 6/47 (15.5 overs)
237 (62 overs); Hasan Raza 72 (133); Tabish Khan 5/53 (24 overs)		156 (54.3 overs); Shahzaib Hasan 52 (65); Mohammad Abbas 8/46 (22.3 overs)

Khan Research Laboratories won by 149 runs
National Stadium, Karachi
Umpires: Ghaffar Kazmi and Waleed Yaqub

- Karachi Whites won the toss and elected to field.

15–18 October
Scorecard

Rawalpindi	v	National Bank of Pakistan
266 (89.2 overs); Sarmad Hameed 85 (202); Altaf Ahmed 4/69 (20.2 overs)		253 (94 overs); Naved Yasin 62 (196); Sohail Tanvir 6/58 (28 overs)
214 (72.4 overs); Sohail Tanvir 44 (107); Altaf Ahmed 5/44 (20.4 overs)		215/9 (70 overs); Qaiser Abbas 50 (54); Abid Hasan 5/31 (19 overs)

Match drawn
Diamond Club Ground, Islamabad
Umpires: Abdul Muqeet and Sajid Afridi

- National Bank of Pakistan won the toss and elected to field.

15–18 October
Scorecard

FATA	v	Pakistan International Airlines
237 (62.5 overs); Fawad Khan 65 (78); Ali Imran 3/47 (11 overs)		235 (76.5 overs); Faisal Iqbal 48 (62); Irfanullah Shah 5/49 (18.5 overs)
342 (93.2 overs); Mohammad Naeem 96 (133); Ali Imran 4/61 (17 overs)		187 (56.4 overs); Faisal Iqbal 74 (125); Asif Afridi 3/19 (7 overs)

Federally Administered Tribal Areas won by 157 runs
Jinnah Stadium, Sialkot
Umpires: Asif Yaqoob and Qaiser Waheed

- Pakistan International Airlines won the toss and elected to field.
- Abdul Aziz (Federally Administered Tribal Areas) made his first-class debut.

15–18 October
Scorecard

Lahore Whites	v	Sui Northern Gas Pipelines Limited
367 (106 overs); Anas Mahmood 147 (203); Imran Khalid 4/80 (32 overs)		545/9d (132 overs); Mohammad Rizwan 167 (264); Qaiser Ashraf 3/133 (41 overs)
332 (88.1 overs); Rameez Alam 130 (178); Asad Ali 4/82 (22.1 overs)		21/0 (4 overs); Imran Butt 12* (15)

Match drawn
Gaddafi Stadium, Lahore

- Sui Northern Gas Pipelines Limited won the toss and elected to field.
- Gauhar Hafeez and Nasir Ali (Lahore Whites) both made their first-class debuts.

===== Round 4 =====
22–25 October
Scorecard

Sui Northern Gas Pipelines Limited	v	Karachi Whites
128 (41.5 overs); Iftikhar Ahmed 48 (68); Tabish Khan 5/23 (13.5 overs)		118 (23.2 overs); Shahzaib Hasan 61 (38); Azizullah 5/42 (8.2 overs)
235 (79.1 overs); Mohammad Rizwan 95 (178); Babar Rehman 3/51 (18 overs)		220 (60.1 overs); Behram Khan 41 (61); Asad Ali 6/60 (18 overs)

Sui Northern Gas Pipelines Limited won by 25 runs
United Bank Limited Sports Complex, Karachi
Umpires: Ghaffar Kazmi and Waleed Yaqub

- Karachi Whites won the toss and elected to field.

22–25 October
Scorecard

Rawalpindi	v	Pakistan International Airlines
198 (58 overs); Taimur Khan 90 (127); Salman Saeed 3/43 (15 overs)		276 (90.2 overs); Sheharyar Ghani 97 (244); Mohammad Talha 5/83 (19.2 overs)
337/7d (124 overs); Sarmad Hameed 100 (271); Aizaz Cheema 2/78 (30 overs)		261/8 (43.5 overs); Agha Sabir 72 (83); Ataullah 4/76 (16 overs)

Pakistan International Airlines won by 2 wickets
Rawalpindi Cricket Stadium, Rawalpindi
Umpires: Abdul Muqeet and Majid Hussain

- Pakistan International Airlines won the toss and elected to field.
- Ali Usman (Pakistan International Airlines) made his first-class debut.

22–25 October
Scorecard

Khan Research Laboratories	v	Lahore Whites
352 (132 overs); Abdul Rehman Muzammil 96 (225); Umaid Asif 3/73 (25 overs)		259 (83.1 overs); Gauhar Hafeez 44 (74); Nayyer Abbas 4/86 (31 overs)
242/6d (54 overs); Hasan Raza 78 (137); Qaiser Ashraf 5/72 (19 overs)		229/5 (63 overs); Rizwan Hussain 126 (187); Nayyer Abbas 2/87 (20 overs)

Match drawn
Lahore City Cricket Association Ground, Lahore
Umpires: Asif Yaqoob and Saqib Khan

- Lahore Whites won the toss and elected to field.
- Rizwan Hussain (Lahore Whites) made his first-class debut.

22–25 October (D/N)
Scorecard

FATA	v	National Bank of Pakistan
192 (53.5 overs); Mohammad Naeem 67* (77); Mohammad Irfan 3/51 (16 overs)		527/8d (104 overs); Ahsan Ali 200 (202); Ahmed Asfandyar 2/84 (18 overs)
584/5 (181 overs); Asif Ali 225 (406); Atif Jabbar 2/138 (36 overs)

Match drawn
Gaddafi Stadium, Lahore
Umpires: Khalid Mahmood and Qaiser Waheed

- National Bank of Pakistan won the toss and elected to field.
- Fazal-ur-Rehman (Federally Administered Tribal Areas) made his first-class debut.

===== Round 5 =====
29 October–1 November
Scorecard

Karachi Whites	v	Rawalpindi
198 (78 overs); Saad Ali 63 (171); Shadab Khan 3/80 (27 overs)		350 (120 overs); Umar Waheed 120 (283); Raza-ul-Hasan 4/67 (32 overs)
325 (129.3 overs); Shahzaib Hasan 74 (113); Kashif Bhatti 6/77 (41.3 overs)		35/3 (5 overs); Mukhtar Ahmed 12 (13); Tabish Khan 1/18 (3 overs)

Match drawn
National Bank of Pakistan Sports Complex, Karachi
Umpires: Mohammad Asif and Waleed Yaqub

- Karachi Whites won the toss and elected to bat.
- Muhammad Asad (Karachi Whites) made his first-class debut.

29 October–1 November
Scorecard

FATA	v	Lahore Whites
235 (72.4 overs); Mohammad Irfan 68 (85); Adnan Rasool 4/45 (17.4 overs)		204 (59 overs); Umar Akmal 50 (54); Asif Afridi 5/62 (16 overs)
163 (41.4 overs); Asif Afridi 55 (59); Saif-ur-Rehman 6/44 (12 overs)		137 (47.1 overs); Rizwan Hussain 25* (40); Mohammad Irfan 5/66 (20.1 overs)

Federally Administered Tribal Areas won by 57 runs
Lahore City Cricket Association Ground, Lahore
Umpires: Khalid Mahmood and Shameem Ansari

- Lahore Whites won the toss and elected to field.

29 October–1 November
Scorecard

Khan Research Laboratories	v	Sui Northern Gas Pipelines Limited
231 (81.2 overs); Usman Arshad 52 (155); Hussain Talat 3/36 (11 overs)		128 (45.3 overs); Adnan Akmal 43 (71); Mohammad Abbas 6/36 (18 overs)
182 (55.1 overs); Saeed Anwar 71 (130); Azizullah 6/55 (23 overs)		136 (56.3 overs); Bilawal Bhatti 34 (54); Mohammad Abbas 4/50 (23.3 overs)

Khan Research Laboratories won by 149 runs
Khan Research Laboratory Ground, Rawalpindi
Umpires: Asif Yaqoob and Imtiaz Iqbal

- Sui Northern Gas Pipelines Limited won the toss and elected to field.

29 October–1 November
Scorecard

Pakistan International Airlines	v	National Bank of Pakistan
274 (97.5 overs); Kamran Sajid 58 (125); Mohammad Irfan 3/49 (24 overs)		475 (114.3 overs); Ahsan Ali 156 (226); Najaf Shah 3/56 (16 overs)
176 (50.5 overs); Fahad Iqbal 81 (98); Ali Manzoor 3/35 (14 overs)

National Bank of Pakistan won by an innings and 25 runs
Rawalpindi Cricket Stadium, Rawalpindi
Umpires: Qaiser Waheed and Sajid Afridi

- Pakistan International Airlines won the toss and elected to bat.
- Mohammad Yasin (Pakistan International Airlines) made his first-class debut.

===== Round 6 =====
5–8 November
Scorecard

Karachi Whites	v	FATA
257 (80.1 overs); Saad Ali 58 (112); Saad Altaf 4/63 (29.1 overs)		179 (51 overs); Mohammad Naeem 105 (155); Tabish Khan 7/56 (17 overs)
134 (27.5 overs); Mohammad Hasan 33 (42); Zeeshan Khan 4/19 (3.5 overs)		120 (38.5 overs); Mohammad Naeem 31 (48); Ghulam Mudassar 7/52 (16 overs)

Karachi Whites won by 92 runs
United Bank Limited Sports Complex, Karachi
Umpires: Ahmed Shahab and Waleed Yaqub

- Federally Administered Tribal Areas won the toss and elected to field.
- Hasnain Khan (Federally Administered Tribal Areas) made his first-class debut.

5–8 November
Scorecard

Lahore Whites	v	Rawalpindi
190 (85.2 overs); Asif Raza 46 (147); Abid Hasan 5/53 (23.2 overs)		298 (108.5 overs); Kashif Bhatti 128* (270); Asif Raza 6/57 (27.2 overs)
141 (71.4 overs); Gauhar Hafeez 28 (57); Nazar Hussain 6/50 (23.4 overs)		34/2 (8.5 overs); Mukhtar Ahmed 17* (27); Umaid Asif 2/11 (4.5 overs)

Rawalpindi won by 8 wickets
Lahore City Cricket Association Ground, Lahore

- Rawalpindi won the toss and elected to field.

5–8 November
Scorecard

Sui Northern Gas Pipelines Limited	v	National Bank of Pakistan
262 (76.5 overs); Taufeeq Umar 69 (122); Afaq Ahmed 4/86 (22.2 overs)		157 (46.4 overs); Usman Salahuddin 40 (88); Manzoor Khan 3/31 (9.4 overs)
161 (52.2 overs); Khurram Shehzad 34 (44); Atif Jabbar 4/41 (10.2 overs)		267/5 (76.1 overs); Hamza Paracha 116 (189); Bilawal Bhatti 2/59 (18 overs)

National Bank of Pakistan won by 5 wickets
Marghzar Cricket Ground, Islamabad
Umpires: Imtiaz Iqbal and Mohammad Asif

- National Bank of Pakistan won the toss and elected to field.

5–8 November
Scorecard

Pakistan International Airlines	v	Khan Research Laboratories
121 (43.5 overs); Fahad Iqbal 62* (133); Ahmed Bashir 4/32 (11 overs)		339 (95.2 overs); Nauman Ali 61 (60); Tahir Khan 8/102 (26.2 overs)
355 (113.1 overs); Shoaib Khan 135 (257); Mohammad Abbas 3/78 (27 overs)		139/4 (36.2 overs); Hasan Raza 35 (66); Tahir Khan 2/46 (14 overs)

Khan Research Laboratories won by 6 wickets
National Ground, Islamabad
Umpires: Asif Yaqoob and Majid Hussain

- Khan Research Laboratories won the toss and elected to field.

===== Round 7 =====
12–15 November
Scorecard

FATA	v	Rawalpindi
120 (32.4 overs); Mohammad Naeem 52 (74); Nazar Hussain 3/18 (7 overs)		152 (46.5 overs); Haseeb Azam 42 (120); Irfanullah Shah 6/59 (19 overs)
136 (41.4 overs); Mohammad Nisar 41 (85); Nazar Hussain 5/44 (14.4 overs)		88 (37.3 overs); Sarmad Hameed 25 (63); Irfanullah Shah 7/29 (18.3 overs)

Federally Administered Tribal Areas won by 16 runs
Rawalpindi Cricket Stadium, Rawalpindi
Umpires: Abdul Muqeet and Adnan Rasheed

- Federally Administered Tribal Areas won the toss and elected to bat.
- Mohammad Nisar (Federally Administered Tribal Areas) made his first-class debut.

12–15 November
Scorecard

Pakistan International Airlines	v	Sui Northern Gas Pipelines Limited
280 (77.1 overs); Shehzar Mohammad 71 (122); Bilawal Bhatti 4/82 (19.1 overs)		313 (97.2 overs); Hussain Talat 82 (207); Aizaz Cheema 3/82 (25 overs)
189 (42 overs); Agha Sabir 83 (112); Mohammad Imran 5/62 (15.1 overs)		160/4 (34.4 overs); Iftikhar Ahmed 65* (64); Hazrat Shah 2/29 (6 overs)

Sui Northern Gas Pipelines Limited won by 6 wickets
Iqbal Stadium, Faisalabad
Umpires: Ahmed Shahab and Qaiser Waheed

- Sui Northern Gas Pipelines Limited won the toss and elected to field.
- Ahmed Saifi (Sui Northern Gas Pipelines Limited) made his first-class debut.

12–15 November
Scorecard

Khan Research Laboratories	v	National Bank of Pakistan
503/9d (146 overs); Abdul Rehman Muzammil 170 (336); Kamran Ghulam 3/78 (19 overs)		228 (90.4 overs); Usman Salahuddin 108* (241); Mohammad Abbas 5/30 (16.4 overs)
197/4 (51 overs); Shoaib Ahmed 116* (150); Atif Jabbar 2/20 (5 overs)

Match drawn
Khan Research Laboratory Ground, Rawalpindi
Umpires: Aslam Bareach and Imtiaz Iqbal

- National Bank of Pakistan won the toss and elected to field.
- Haris Asif (Khan Research Laboratories) and Gohar Shah (National Bank of Pakistan) both made their first-class debuts.

12–15 November (D/N)
Scorecard

Lahore Whites	v	Karachi Whites
236 (66.1 overs); Farhan Khan 72 (124); Abdullah Mukaddam 4/79 (16 overs)		500/8d (132.3 overs); Behram Khan 136 (243); Ali Azmat 3/90 (27.3 overs)
317 (103.4 overs); Abdul Wahab Dar 80 (215); Raza-ul-Hasan 4/73 (32 overs)		54/2 (7.2 overs); Saad Ali 23 (14); Umaid Asif 2/29 (4 overs)

Karachi Whites won by 8 wickets
Gaddafi Stadium, Lahore
Umpires: Asif Yaqoob and Sajid Afridi

- Karachi Whites won the toss and elected to field.
- Mohammad Afzal (Karachi Whites) made his first-class debut.

== Super Eight stage ==
=== Tables ===
Group I
Team	Pld	W	L	D	Pts
Water and Power Development Authority (Q)	3	2	0	1	22
Sui Southern Gas Corporation	3	2	0	1	19
Sui Northern Gas Pipelines	3	1	2	0	9
Karachi Whites	3	0	3	0	0

Group II
Team	Pld	W	L	D	Pts
Habib Bank Limited (Q)	3	2	0	1	16
United Bank Limited	3	1	0	2	10
Khan Research Laboratories	3	1	1	1	9
National Bank of Pakistan	3	0	3	0	0

(Q) The top team in each group advanced to the Final

Position determined by total points, most matches won, fewest matches lost, followed by adjusted net run rate (matches with no result, i.e. those where both teams did not complete their first innings, were disregarded); matches finishing in a draw were decided on first innings scores, with points awarded as follows:
- Win by an innings = 10 points
- Win having led on first innings = 9 points
- Win having tied or trailed on first innings = 6 points
- Tie having led on first innings = 5 points
- Draw having led on first innings = 3 points
- Draw having tied on first innings, or tie having trailed on first innings = 2 points
- Draw with no result on first innings, or abandoned without a ball bowled = 1 point
- Loss, or draw having trailed on first innings = 0 points

=== Results ===
==== Group I ====
19–22 November
Scorecard

Sui Southern Gas Corporation	v	Karachi Whites
240 (74.3 overs); Zain Abbas 86 (140); Tabish Khan 4/23 (17.3 overs)		84 (39 overs); Azam Hussain 16 (28); Mohammad Irfan 4/24 (14 overs)
174/5 (42.2 overs); Asif Zakir 75 (100); Ghulam Mudassar 3/31 (9 overs)		329 (107.4 overs) (f/o); Faraz Ali 128 (257); Mohammad Irfan 4/77 (27.4 overs)

Sui Southern Gas Corporation won by 5 wickets
United Bank Limited Sports Complex, Karachi
Umpires: Ahsan Raza and Ghaffar Kazmi

- Karachi Whites won the toss and elected to field.

19–22 November (D/N)
Scorecard

WAPDA	v	Sui Northern Gas Pipelines
273 (77.3 overs); Kamran Akmal 162 (220); Mohammad Imran 3/61 (20.3 overs)		115 (33.5 overs); Taufeeq Umar 49* (88); Naseer Akram 5/32 (13 overs)
183 (65.2 overs); Kamran Akmal 40 (58); Bilawal Bhatti 5/40 (19 overs)		152 (46 overs); Abubakar Khan 43 (70); Zulfiqar Babar 4/35 (14 overs)

Water and Power Development Authority won by 189 runs
National Stadium, Karachi
Umpires: Rashid Riaz and Shozab Raza

- Sui Northern Gas Pipelines Limited and elected to field.

26–29 November
Scorecard

Karachi Whites	v	WAPDA
172 (72.4 overs); Behram Khan 45 (101); Zulfiqar Babar 5/75 (30.4 overs)		421 (113.5 overs); Salman Butt 120 (155); Raza-ul-Hasan 3/93 (25.5 overs)
169 (48.5 overs); Saad Ali 57 (104); Khalid Usman 4/35 (11.5 overs)

Water and Power Development Authority won by an innings and 80 runs
National Bank of Pakistan Sports Complex, Karachi
Umpires: Ahmed Shahab and Ahsan Raza

- Karachi Whites won the toss and elected to bat.

26–29 November
Scorecard

Sui Southern Gas Corporation	v	Sui Northern Gas Pipelines
355 (94.4 overs); Asif Zakir 105 (190); Mohammad Imran 4/61 (14 overs)		85 (41.3 overs); Iftikhar Ahmed 18 (63); Aamer Yamin 6/33 (16 overs)
		225 (106.2 overs) (f/o); Iftikhar Ahmed 100 (272); Ahmed Jamal 3/27 (17.2 overs)

Sui Southern Gas Corporation won by an innings and 45 runs
State Bank of Pakistan Sports Complex, Karachi
Umpires: Sajid Afridi and Zameer Haider

- Sui Southern Gas Corporation won the toss and elected to bat.

3–6 December
Scorecard

WAPDA	v	Sui Southern Gas Corporation
353 (137 overs); Kamran Akmal 144 (234); Zia-ul-Haq 3/61 (31 overs)		306 (138 overs); Adil Amin 90 (214); Mohammad Asif 3/41 (26 overs)
136/4 (80 overs); Zahid Mansoor 39 (160); Mohammad Irfan 3/38 (19 overs)

Match drawn
Niaz Stadium, Hyderabad
Umpires: Ahsan Raza and Qaiser Waheed

- Sui Southern Gas Corporation won the toss and elected to field.

3–6 December (D/N)
Scorecard

Sui Northern Gas Pipelines	v	Karachi Whites
361 (98.2 overs); Iftikhar Ahmed 181 (275); Tabish Khan 7/77 (27.2 overs)		206 (73.5 overs); Behram Khan 64 (125); Imran Ali 3/31 (16 overs)
237 (62.4 overs); Abubakar Khan 55 (68); Babar Rehman 5/51 (17.4 overs)		202 (46.5 overs); Daniyal Ahsan 52* (52); Asad Ali 4/63 (21 overs)

Sui Northern Gas Pipelines Limited won by 190 runs
National Stadium, Karachi
Umpires: Ahmed Shahab and Sajid Afridi

- Sui Northern Gas Pipelines Limited won the toss and elected to bat.

==== Group II ====
19–22 November
Scorecard

Khan Research Laboratories	v	United Bank Limited
293 (98.4 overs); Yasir Ali 78* (122); Mir Hamza 5/49 (26.4 overs)		240 (84.4 overs); Akbar-ur-Rehman 85 (132); Mohammad Abbas 5/62 (19.4 overs)
298 (89.4 overs); Junaid Ali 99 (164); Yasim Murtaza 4/66 (23 overs)		233/8 (63 overs); Sohaib Maqsood 46 (56); Mohammad Abbas 3/64 (17 overs)

Match drawn
Niaz Stadium, Hyderabad
Umpires: Ahmed Shahab and Asif Yaqoob

- United Bank Limited won the toss and elected to field.

19–22 November
Scorecard

National Bank of Pakistan	v	Habib Bank Limited
279 (114.1 overs); Usman Salahuddin 112* (289); Abdur Rehman 4/52 (26.1 overs)		439/9d (137.3 overs); Imran Farhat 108 (173); Yasir Hussain 3/134 (42 overs)
184 (62.4 overs); Usman Salahuddin 56 (114); Usman Khan 4/40 (13 overs)		25/0 (7.1 overs); Fakhar Zaman 18* (26)

Habib Bank Limited won by 10 wickets
State Bank of Pakistan Sports Complex, Karachi
Umpires: Imtiaz Iqbal and Riazuddin

- Habib Bank Limited won the toss and elected to field.

26–29 November
Scorecard

United Bank Limited	v	National Bank of Pakistan
176 (62.2 overs); Hammad Azam 64 (68); Mohammad Irfan 5/84 (26.2 overs)		171 (65.2 overs); Naved Sarwar 42 (80); Mir Hamza 4/58 (26 overs)
301 (93.3 overs); Hammad Azam 102 (144); Atif Jabbar 7/74 (30.3 overs)		78 (28.4 overs); Naved Sarwar 32 (64); Sameen Gul 5/20 (10 overs)

United Bank Limited won by 228 runs
United Bank Limited Sports Complex, Karachi
Umpires: Asif Yaqoob and Riazuddin

- National Bank of Pakistan won the toss and elected to field.

26–29 November (D/N)
Scorecard

Habib Bank Limited	v	Khan Research Laboratories
151 (42.4 overs); Faheem Ashraf 63 (55); Ahmed Bashir 6/35 (11.4 overs)		157 (57.4 overs); Junaid Ali 42 (70); Faheem Ashraf 6/65 (21 overs)
393/8d (118.4 overs); Imam-ul-Haq 86 (179); Sadaf Hussain 4/86 (24.4 overs)		190 (83.2 overs); Hasan Raza 57 (151); Amad Butt 3/43 (12 overs)

Habib Bank Limited won by 197 runs
National Stadium, Karachi
Umpires: Ghaffar Kazmi and Shozab Raza

- Khan Research Laboratories won the toss and elected to field.

3–6 December
Scorecard

Khan Research Laboratories	v	National Bank of Pakistan
244 (84 overs); Usman Arshad 121 (216); Atif Jabbar 5/43 (15 overs)		287 (85.1 overs); Rameez Raja 102 (205); Ahmed Bashir 4/56 (18.1 overs)
184 (63.3 overs); Mohammad Yasin 55 (131); Atif Jabbar 5/50 (16.3 overs)		115 (37.4 overs); Hamza Paracha 24 (38); Mohammad Abbas 7/52 (19 overs)

Khan Research Laboratories won by 26 runs
United Bank Limited Sports Complex, Karachi
Umpires: Ghaffar Kazmi and Riazuddin

- Khan Research Laboratories won the toss and elected to bat.

3–6 December
Scorecard

Habib Bank Limited	v	United Bank Limited
486 (183.4 overs); Imran Farhat 133 (272); Mir Hamza 5/66 (29.4 overs)		20/0 (6 overs); Umar Siddiq 10* (18)

Match drawn
National Bank of Pakistan Sports Complex, Karachi

- Habib Bank Limited won the toss and elected to bat.
- The match was declared a draw after two players for United Bank Limited were injured in a hotel fire in Karachi on the evening of day 2.

== Final ==
10–15 December (D/N)
Scorecard

Habib Bank Limited	v	WAPDA
236 (82.1 overs); Rameez Aziz 90 (221); Mohammad Asif 4/29 (18.1 overs)		278 (106.3 overs); Salman Butt 125 (234); Abdur Rehman 3/66 (35.3 overs)
485/1d (122.5 overs); Imam-ul-Haq 200* (364); Zulfiqar Babar 1/129 (38 overs)		198/3 (111 overs); Salman Butt 105* (337); Usman Khan 2/40 (19 overs)

Match drawn (WAPDA won on 1st innings lead)
National Stadium, Karachi
Umpires: Ahsan Raza and Asif Yaqoob
Player of the match: Salman Butt (Water and Power Development Authority)

- Water and Power Development Authority won the toss and elected to field.
