= 2017–18 National T20 Cup =

Cricket tournament

- Dates: 11 – 30 November 2017
- Administrator: Pakistan Cricket Board
- Cricket format: Twenty20
- Tournament format(s): Round-robin and Final
- Host: Pakistan
- Champions: Lahore Blues (1st title)
- Participants: 8
- Matches: 31
- Most runs: Kamran Akmal (432)
- Most wickets: Umaid Asif (14)
- Official website: www.pcb.com.pk

The 2017–18 National T20 Cup was a Twenty20 domestic cricket competition that was played in Pakistan. It was the 14th season of the National Twenty20 Cup in Pakistan. It was originally scheduled to take place in August and September 2017 with eight teams competing. However, in August 2017, the tournament was postponed until November 2017 because of the 2017 Independence Cup and Pakistan's series against Sri Lanka. All the matches were originally scheduled to be played at the Multan Cricket Stadium and the Iqbal Stadium. Following the revision of the competition's schedule, all the fixtures took place at the Rawalpindi Cricket Stadium.

The tournament started on 11 November and was scheduled to conclude on 26 November 2017. However, the semi-final fixtures were initially postponed by the Pakistan Cricket Board (PCB) by one day, following a protest by a religious party, which required more than 8,500 police and troops to remove the protesters. The next day, the PCB postponed the matches because of the "prevailing situation" and said they would announce new dates for the tournament at a later point. The PCB also confirmed that the Super Eight section of the 2017–18 Quaid-e-Azam Trophy would also be postponed until a later date. On 27 November 2017 the PCB confirmed that the semi-finals and final would take place on 29 and 30 November 2017, respectively.

The defending champions, Karachi Blues, were not invited by the PCB to compete in this year's competition. Ahead of the tournament, the PCB recalled thirteen players who were playing in domestic competitions in England and in the 2017 Caribbean Premier League (CPL). However, shortly afterwards the PCB allowed players to return from the CPL and English domestic fixtures if they wished.

In the penultimate group-stage match, between Lahore Whites and Islamabad, batsmen Kamran Akmal and Salman Butt made an unbeaten opening stand of 209 runs. This was the highest opening partnership in Twenty20 cricket, beating the previous best of 207 runs set by Joe Denly and Daniel Bell-Drummond of Kent in the 2017 NatWest t20 Blast. Akmal became the first batsman for Pakistan to score 150 runs in a T20 match. He also hit the most number of sixes in a domestic T20 match in Pakistan and became the third batsman to make five consecutive fifties in T20 cricket.

Lahore Whites were the first side to qualify for the semi-finals, when they beat Peshawar by 27 runs on 21 November 2017. The next day, Lahore Blues also qualified for the semi-finals, with a five-wicket victory against Islamabad. In the penultimate round of group-stage fixtures, Faisalabad beat Peshawar by five wickets to advance to the semi-finals. In the final group-stage match, Federally Administered Tribal Areas beat Faisalabad by four wickets to progress to the semi-finals, having a superior net run rate than Karachi Whites, after both teams finished on seven points each.

In the semi-finals, Saeed Ajmal played in his final match of his 25-year-long career, playing for Faisalabad. In the first semi-final, Lahore Whites defeated Faisalabad by 10 runs. In the second semi-final, Lahore Blues defeated Federally Administered Tribal Areas, by 10 runs, therefore ensuring an all-Lahore final. Lahore Blues went on to beat Lahore Whites by 7 wickets in the final.

== Squads ==
Ahead of the tournament, the following players were selected:

Faisalabad	FATA	Islamabad	Karachi Whites	Lahore Blues	Lahore Whites	Peshawar	Rawalpindi
Misbah-ul-Haq (c); Saeed Ajmal; Asif Ali; Faheem Ashraf; Sohaib Maqsood; Imran Butt; Khurram Shehzad; M Sami; Taj Wali; Sahibzada Farhan; Yasir Shah; Ali Waqas; Imran Khalid; Ali Shan; Asad Raza	Usman Shinwari (c); Rehan Afridi; Asif Afridi; Khushdil Shah; Mukhtar Ahmed; Naved Malik; Awais Zia; Bilawal Bhatti; Sameen Gul; Usama Mir; Hammad Azam; Mohammad Naeem; Nabi Gul; Irfan Rasheed; Shaheen Afridi	Imad Wasim (c); Hasan Ali; Zohaib Ahmed; Sarmad Bhatti; Nauman Anwar; Adil Amin; Shan Masood; Rahat Ali; Umar Gul; Shoaib Malik; Rohail Nazir; Ali Sarfraz; Shehzad Azam; Faizan Riaz; Arsal Sheikh	Sarfaraz Ahmed (c); Asad Shafiq; Anwar Ali; Rumman Raees; Khurram Manzoor; Shahid Yousuf; Akbar-ur-Rehman; Mir Hamza; Tabish Khan; Haris Sohail; Zulfiqar Babar; Danish Aziz; Azam Hussain; Jahid Ali; Abrar Ahmed	Mohammad Hafeez (c); Babar Azam; Ahmed Shehzad; Hussain Talat; Imam-ul-Haq; Tayyab Tahir; Abid Ali; Khalid Usman; Atif Jabbar; Mohammad Amir; Junaid Khan; Agha Salman; Saad Nasim; Adnan Akmal; Ghulam Muddasar	Salman Butt (c); Wahab Riaz; Kamran Akmal; Umar Akmal; Sami Aslam; Asif Ali; Asif Zakir; Ehsan Adil; Mohammad Irfan; Aamer Yamin; Bilal Asif; Amad Butt; Raza Ali Dar; Azhar Ali; Hassan Khan	Mohammad Rizwan (c); Zohaib Khan; Israrullah; Imran Khan; Israrullah; Musadiq Ahmed; Naved Yasin; Waqas Maqsood; Imran Khan; Fakhar Zaman; Sohail Khan; Kashif Bhatti; Imran Khan; Usman Qadir; Saif Badar	Umar Amin (c); Sohail Tanvir; Shadab Khan; Mohammad Nawaz; Fawad Alam; Zain Abbas; Ahsan Ali; Mohammad Irfan; Mohammad Abbas; Iftikhar Ahmed; Mohammad Asghar; Rameez Aziz; Nasir Nawaz; Adnan Ghaus; Umair Masood

== Points table ==
Team	Pld	W	L	NR	NRR	Pts
Lahore Whites	7	5	1	1	+1.759	11
Lahore Blues	7	5	1	1	+0.392	11
Faisalabad	7	4	2	1	+0.163	9
Federally Administered Tribal Areas	7	3	3	1	–0.019	7
Karachi Whites	7	3	3	1	–0.041	7
Islamabad	7	2	4	1	–1.193	5
Peshawar	7	1	5	1	–0.380	3
Rawalpindi	7	1	5	1	–0.647	3

Team qualified for the Semi-finals

== Fixtures ==
=== Round-robin ===
11 November 2017
12:00
Scorecard

Karachi Whites; 180/5 (20 overs)	v	Faisalabad; 183/2 (18.2 overs)
Akbar-ur-Rehman 60 (39); Faheem Ashraf 3/36 (4 overs)		Sahibzada Farhan 76* (52); Rumman Raees 1/33 (4 overs)

Faisalabad won by 8 wickets
Rawalpindi Cricket Stadium, Rawalpindi
Umpires: Ghaffar Kazmi and Majid Hussain
Player of the match: Sahibzada Farhan (Faisalabad)

- Faisalabad won the toss and elected to field.

11 November 2017
16:00 (D/N)
Scorecard

Lahore Blues; 169/5 (20 overs)	v	Lahore Whites; 168/5 (20 overs)
Imam-ul-Haq 44 (32); Bilal Asif 1/20 (3 overs)		Sami Aslam 91* (60); Mohammad Amir 2/24 (4 overs)

Lahore Blues won by 1 run
Rawalpindi Cricket Stadium, Rawalpindi
Umpires: Faisal Afridi and Imtiaz Iqbal
Player of the match: Sami Aslam (Lahore Whites)

- Lahore Whites won the toss and elected to field.

12 November 2017
12:00
Scorecard

Peshawar; 164/6 (20 overs)	v	FATA; 166/4 (18.5 overs)
Musadiq Ahmed 51* (27); Usama Mir 2/24 (4 overs)		Awais Zia 50 (32); Zohaib Khan 1/11 (3 overs)

Federally Administered Tribal Areas won by 6 wickets
Rawalpindi Cricket Stadium, Rawalpindi
Umpires: Aslam Bareach and Tahir Shah
Player of the match: Awais Zia (Federally Administered Tribal Areas)

- Federally Administered Tribal Areas won the toss and elected to field.

12 November 2017
16:00 (D/N)
Scorecard

Islamabad; 175/4 (20 overs)	v	Rawalpindi; 173/5 (20 overs)
Shan Masood 83 (52); Mohammad Abbas 2/32 (4 overs)		Umar Amin 56 (36); Mohammad Irfan 2/31 (4 overs)

Islamabad won by 2 runs
Rawalpindi Cricket Stadium, Rawalpindi
Umpires: Ghaffar Kazmi and Shozab Raza
Player of the match: Shan Masood (Islamabad)

- Rawalpindi won the toss and elected to field.
- Saad Ali, Mohammad Naqash (Islamabad), Umair Masood and Nasir Nawaz (Rawalpindi) all made their T20 debuts.

13 November 2017
12:00
Scorecard

Lahore Blues; 187/5 (20 overs)	v	Faisalabad; 193/3 (18.1 overs)
Imam-ul-Haq 50 (31); Saeed Ajmal 3/26 (4 overs)		Sohaib Maqsood 80* (42); Hussain Talat 1/8 (1 overs)

Faisalabad won by 7 wickets
Rawalpindi Cricket Stadium, Rawalpindi
Umpires: Aslam Bareach and Imtiaz Iqbal
Player of the match: Sohaib Maqsood (Faisalabad)

- Faisalabad won the toss and elected to field.

13 November 2017
16:00 (D/N)
Scorecard

Karachi Whites; 163/8 (20 overs)	v	Lahore Whites; 167/7 (19.4 overs)
Khurram Manzoor 64 (43); Umaid Asif 3/18 (4 overs)		Sami Aslam 56 (38); Zulfiqar Babar 2/18 (4 overs)

Lahore Whites won by 3 wickets
Rawalpindi Cricket Stadium, Rawalpindi
Umpires: Majid Hussain and Saqib Khan
Player of the match: Sami Aslam (Lahore Whites)

- Lahore Whites won the toss and elected to field.

14 November 2017
12:00
Scorecard

Rawalpindi; 116 (18.3 overs)	v	Peshawar
Mohammad Irfan 30 (10); Sohail Khan 4/22 (3.3 overs)

No result
Rawalpindi Cricket Stadium, Rawalpindi
Umpires: Aslam Bareach and Shozab Raza

- Peshawar won the toss and elected to field.
- Rain prevented any further play.

14 November 2017
16:00 (D/N)
Scorecard

Islamabad	v	FATA

Match abandoned
Rawalpindi Cricket Stadium, Rawalpindi
Umpires: Ahsan Raza and Mohammad Asif

- No toss.
- No play was possible due to rain.

15 November 2017
12:00
Scorecard

Faisalabad; 29/2 (5.3 overs)	v	Lahore Whites
Sahibzada Farhan 14* (19); Wahab Riaz 1/6 (1 over)

No result
Rawalpindi Cricket Stadium, Rawalpindi
Umpires: Imtiaz Iqbal and Shozab Raza

- Lahore Whites won the toss and elected to field.
- Rain prevented any further play.
- Asad Raza (Faisalabad) made his T20 debut.

15 November 2017
16:00 (D/N)
Scorecard

Karachi Whites	v	Lahore Blues

Match abandoned
Rawalpindi Cricket Stadium, Rawalpindi
Umpires: Ahsan Raza and Saqib Khan

- No toss.
- No play was possible due to rain.

16 November 2017
12:00
Scorecard

Islamabad; 128 (19.2 overs)	v	Peshawar; 129/7 (19.4 overs)
Hasan Ali 35 (20); Kashif Bhatti 2/22 (3 overs)		Israrullah 56 (50); Mohammad Irfan 2/9 (4 overs)

Peshawar won by 3 wickets
Rawalpindi Cricket Stadium, Rawalpindi
Umpires: Ahsan Raza and Waleed Yaqub
Player of the match: Israrullah (Peshawar)

- Peshawar won the toss and elected to field.

16 November 2017
16:00 (D/N)
Scorecard

FATA; 160/8 (20 overs)	v	Rawalpindi; 163/4 (19.5 overs)
Khushdil Shah 50 (32); Mohammad Asghar 2/41 (4 overs)		Umar Amin 66 (49); Hammad Azam 2/23 (4 overs)

Rawalpindi won by 6 wickets
Rawalpindi Cricket Stadium, Rawalpindi
Umpires: Qaiser Waheed and Zameer Haider
Player of the match: Umar Amin (Rawalpindi)

- Rawalpindi won the toss and elected to field.

17 November 2017
12:00
Scorecard

Lahore Whites; 213/4 (20 overs)	v	FATA; 172 (18.3 overs)
Salman Butt 74* (50); Sohail Akhtar 2/38 (4 overs)		Hammad Azam 50 (28); Wahab Riaz 3/15 (3.3 overs)

Lahore Whites won by 41 runs.
Rawalpindi Cricket Stadium, Rawalpindi
Umpires: Tahir Rasheed and Zameer Haider
Player of the match: Kamran Akmal (Lahore Whites)

- Federally Administered Tribal Areas won the toss and elected to field.

17 November 2017
16:00 (D/N)
Scorecard

Karachi Whites; 178/6 (20 overs)	v	Rawalpindi; 164/9 (20 overs)
Asad Shafiq 72 (49); Mohammad Irfan 2/43 (4 overs)		Umar Amin 28 (14); Anwar Ali 4/30 (4 overs)

Karachi Whites won by 14 runs
Rawalpindi Cricket Stadium, Rawalpindi
Umpires: Tahir Shah and Waleed Yaqub
Player of the match: Asad Shafiq (Karachi Whites)

- Rawalpindi won the toss and elected to field.

18 November 2017
12:00
Scorecard

Lahore Blues; 173/6 (20 overs)	v	Peshawar; 170 (19.5 overs)
Ahmed Shehzad 50 (22); Waqas Maqsood 3/23 (4 overs)		Naved Yasin 62* (44); Ali Shafiq 3/21 (2.5 overs)

Lahore Blues won by 3 runs
Rawalpindi Cricket Stadium, Rawalpindi
Umpires: Aaley Haider and Shameem Ansari
Player of the match: Ahmed Shehzad (Peshawar) and Ali Shafiq (Lahore Blues)

- Peshawar won the toss and elected to field.
- Ali Shafiq, Waqas Ahmed (Lahore Blues) and Saif Badar (Peshawar) all made their T20 debuts.

18 November 2017
16:00 (D/N)
Scorecard

Faisalabad; 170/7 (20 overs)	v	Islamabad; 171/8 (20 overs)
Sahibzada Farhan 43 (39); Adil Amin 4/27 (4 overs)		Saad Ali 52 (40); Taj Wali 3/30 (4 overs)

Islamabad won by 2 wickets
Rawalpindi Cricket Stadium, Rawalpindi
Umpires: Mohammad Asif and Tahir Shah
Player of the match: Adil Amin (Islamabad) and Taj Wali (Faisalabad)

- Faisalabad won the toss and elected to bat.

19 November 2017
12:00
Scorecard

Lahore Whites; 178/7 (20 overs)	v	Rawalpindi; 150/8 (20 overs)
Kamran Akmal 65 (37); Sohail Tanvir 2/30 (4 overs)		Umar Amin 35 (23); Bilal Asif 2/20 (4 overs)

Lahore Whites won by 28 runs
Rawalpindi Cricket Stadium, Rawalpindi
Umpires: Aaley Haider and Tahir Rasheed
Player of the match: Kamran Akmal (Lahore Whites)

- Lahore Whites won the toss and elected to bat.

19 November 2017
16:00 (D/N)
Scorecard

Peshawar; 155/7 (20 overs)	v	Karachi Whites; 156/6 (19.3 overs)
Israrullah 50 (31); Asad Shafiq 2/7 (2 overs)		Anwar Ali 41* (20); Musadiq Ahmed 1/13 (2 overs)

Karachi Whites won by 4 wickets
Rawalpindi Cricket Stadium, Rawalpindi
Umpires: Ahmed Shahab and Qaiser Waheed
Player of the match: Anwar Ali (Karachi Whites)

- Karachi Whites won the toss and elected to field.
- Obaidullah (Peshawar) made his T20 debut.

20 November 2017
12:00
Scorecard

Karachi Whites; 148 (19 overs)	v	Islamabad; 129/5 (20 overs)
Asad Shafiq 45 (27); Mohammad Irfan 3/25 (4 overs)		Nauman Anwar 34 (33); Rumman Raees 1/18 (4 overs)

Karachi Whites won by 19 runs
Rawalpindi Cricket Stadium, Rawalpindi
Umpires: Ahmed Shahab and Rashid Riaz
Player of the match: Asad Shafiq (Karachi Whites)

- Islamabad won the toss and elected to field.

20 November 2017
16:00 (D/N)
Scorecard

Lahore Blues; 177/4 (20 overs)	v	FATA; 158/7 (20 overs)
Hussain Talat 68* (46); Sameen Gul 1/26 (4 overs)		Sohail Akhtar 74* (56); Aizaz Cheema 3/24 (4 overs)

Lahore Blues won by 19 runs
Rawalpindi Cricket Stadium, Rawalpindi
Umpires: Mohammad Sajid and Shameem Ansari
Player of the match: Aizaz Cheema and Hussain Talat (Lahore Blues)

- Federally Administered Tribal Areas won the toss and elected to field.

21 November 2017
12:00
Scorecard

Lahore Whites; 163/4 (20 overs)	v	Peshawar; 136 (19.3 overs)
Salman Butt 85* (58); Sohail Khan 1/28 (4 overs)		Naved Yasin 25 (28); Umaid Asif 4/26 (4 overs)

Lahore Whites won by 27 runs
Rawalpindi Cricket Stadium, Rawalpindi
Umpires: Aaley Haider and Khalid Mahmood
Player of the match: Salman Butt and Umaid Asif (Lahore Whites)

- Lahore Whites won the toss and elected to bat.

21 November 2017
16:00 (D/N)
Scorecard

Rawalpindi; 193/3 (20 overs)	v	Faisalabad; 199/5 (19.5 overs)
Umar Amin 67 (47); Taj Wali 1/31 (4 overs)		Sohaib Maqsood 87 (43); Shadab Khan 2/23 (4 overs)

Faisalabad won by 5 wickets
Rawalpindi Cricket Stadium, Rawalpindi
Umpires: Tahir Rasheed and Tariq Rasheed
Player of the match: Sohaib Maqsood (Faisalabad)

- Rawalpindi won the toss and elected to bat.
- Adnan Ghaus (Rawalpindi) made his T20 debut.

22 November 2017
12:00
Scorecard

FATA; 219/6 (20 overs)	v	Karachi Whites; 200/5 (20 overs)
Mukhtar Ahmed 117 (58); Anwar Ali 2/51 (4 overs)		Khurram Manzoor 104 (61); Sameen Gul 2/26 (4 overs)

Federally Administered Tribal Areas won by 19 runs
Rawalpindi Cricket Stadium, Rawalpindi
Umpires: Ahmed Shahab and Asif Yaqoob
Player of the match: Mukhtar Ahmed (Federally Administered Tribal Areas)

- Karachi Whites won the toss and elected to field.
- Nabi Gul (Federally Administered Tribal Areas) made his T20 debut.

22 November 2017
16:00 (D/N)
Scorecard

Islamabad; 174/3 (20 overs)	v	Lahore Blues; 177/5 (18.4 overs)
Shan Masood 103* (68); Khalid Usman 2/32 (4 overs)		Ahmed Shehzad 79 (47); Mohammad Irfan 1/18 (4 overs)

Lahore Blues won by 5 wickets
Rawalpindi Cricket Stadium, Rawalpindi
Umpires: Khalid Mahmood and Mohammad Sajid
Player of the match: Shan Masood (Lahore Blues)

- Islamabad won the toss and elected to bat.
- Rohail Nazir (Islamabad) made his T20 debut.

23 November 2017
12:00
Scorecard

Rawalpindi; 118 (17.4 overs)	v	Lahore Blues; 124/3 (17.1 overs)
Iftikhar Ahmed 60 (33); Atif Jabbar 3/25 (4 overs)		Imam-ul-Haq 36 (39); Mohammad Asghar 3/13 (4 overs)

Lahore Blues won by 7 wickets
Rawalpindi Cricket Stadium, Rawalpindi
Umpires: Khalid Mahmood and Mohammad Sajid
Player of the match: Agha Salman (Lahore Blues)

- Lahore Blues won the toss and elected to field.
- Mohammad Ismail (Rawalpindi) made his T20 debut.

23 November 2017
16:00 (D/N)
Scorecard

Peshawar; 139 (19.5 overs)	v	Faisalabad; 142/5 (20 overs)
Rafatullah Mohmand 32 (12); Taj Wali 3/29 (4 overs)		Sahibzada Farhan 47 (49); Sohail Khan 2/19 (4 overs)

Faisalabad won by 5 wickets
Rawalpindi Cricket Stadium, Rawalpindi
Umpires: Asif Yaqoob and Rashid Riaz
Player of the match: Sahibzada Farhan (Faisalabad)

- Faisalabad won the toss and elected to field.

24 November 2017
12:00
Scorecard

Lahore Whites; 209/0 (20 overs)	v	Islamabad; 100 (18.4 overs)
Kamran Akmal 150* (71)		Raza Hasan 19 (15); Asif Ali 3/27 (4 overs)

Lahore Whites won by 109 runs
Rawalpindi Cricket Stadium, Rawalpindi
Umpires: Khalid Mahmood and Mohammad Sajid
Player of the match: Kamran Akmal (Lahore Whites)

- Islamabad won the toss and elected to field.

24 November 2017
16:00 (D/N)
Scorecard

Faisalabad; 157/5 (20 overs)	v	FATA; 158/6 (16.4 overs)
Asif Ali 52* (35); Zia-ul-Haq 2/24 (4 overs)		Mukhtar Ahmed 46 (27); Yasir Shah 3/23 (4 overs)

Federally Administered Tribal Areas won by 4 wickets
Rawalpindi Cricket Stadium, Rawalpindi
Umpires: Asif Yaqoob and Zameer Haider
Player of the match: Hammad Azam (Federally Administered Tribal Areas)

- Federally Administered Tribal Areas won the toss and elected to field.

=== Knockout stage ===
==== Semi-finals ====
29 November 2017
12:00
Scorecard

Lahore Whites; 142/7 (19/20 overs)	v	Faisalabad; 132 (19.4 overs)
Salman Butt 40 (23); Asad Ali 2/37 (4 overs)		Sohaib Maqsood 39 (31); Wahab Riaz 2/15 (4 overs)

Lahore Whites won by 10 runs
Rawalpindi Cricket Stadium, Rawalpindi
Umpires: Ahmed Shahab and Mohammad Asif
Player of the match: Wahab Riaz (Lahore Whites)

- Faisalabad won the toss and elected to field.

29 November 2017
16:00 (D/N)
Scorecard

Lahore Blues; 221/1 (20 overs)	v	FATA; 211/8 (20 overs)
Ahmed Shehzad 104 (59); Mohammad Irfan 1/35 (4 overs)		Khushdil Shah 56 (32); Agha Salman 2/30 (4 overs)

Lahore Blues won by 10 runs
Rawalpindi Cricket Stadium, Rawalpindi
Umpires: Mohammad Sajid and Shozab Raza
Player of the match: Ahmed Shehzad (Lahore Blues)

- Federally Administered Tribal Areas won the toss and elected to field.

==== Final ====
30 November 2017
16:00 (D/N)
Scorecard

Lahore Whites; 127/5 (20 overs)	v	Lahore Blues; 131/3 (17.3 overs)
Salman Butt 62* (59); Atif Jabbar 2/24 (4 overs)		Imam-ul-Haq 59* (49); Asif Ali 1/23 (3 overs)

Lahore Blues won by 7 wickets
Rawalpindi Cricket Stadium, Rawalpindi
Umpires: Asif Yaqoob and Mohammad Sajid
Player of the match: Imam-ul-Haq (Lahore Blues)

- Lahore Whites won the toss and elected to bat.
