= Ali Imran (cricketer, born 1985) =

Pakistani cricketer (born 1985)

Personal information
- Full name: Ali Imran Pasha
- Born: 18 July 1985 (age 41); Gujranwala, Punjab, Pakistan
- Batting: Right-handed
- Bowling: Right-arm fast-medium
- Role: Bowler

Domestic team information
- Years: Team
- 2002/03–2003/04: Gujranwala
- 2003/04–2006/07: Sialkot
- 2004/05–2005/06: Sialkot Stallions
- 2005/06: Quetta
- 2005/06: Quetta Bears
- 2014/15–2016/17: Pakistan International Airlines
- 2017/18: Islamabad
- FC debut: 21 December 2002 Gujranwala v Sialkot
- Last FC: 21 October 2017 Islamabad v Faisalabad
- LA debut: 19 March 2003 Gujranwala v Multan
- Last LA: 21 December 2016 Pakistan International Airlines v National Bank of Pakistan

Career statistics
Competition	First-class	List A	Twenty20
Matches	54	28	7
Runs scored	627	83	7
Batting average	13.06	13.83	3.50
100s/50s	0/1	0/0	0/0
Top score	69	17*	3
Balls bowled	8420	1319	136
Wickets	215	46	5
Bowling average	22.89	24.86	39.60
5 wickets in innings	9	1	0
10 wickets in match	3	0	0
Best bowling	7/20	5/68	2/11
Catches/stumpings	19/–	7/–	2/–
- Source: ESPNCricinfo, 5 July 2026

Ali Imran (born 18 July 1985) is a Pakistani former cricketer. Imran was a right-handed batsman who bowled right-arm fast-medium. He was born in Gujranwala, Punjab.

== Career ==
Imran made his first-class debut for Gujranwala against Sialkot in the 2002–03 Quaid-e-Azam Trophy on 21 December 2002. He made his List A debut for Gujranwala against Multan in the National Bank of Pakistan Patron's Cup on 19 March 2003, and made his Twenty20 debut for Sialkot Stallions against Lahore Eagles in the ABN-AMRO Twenty-20 Cup on 26 April 2005.

During his domestic career, Imran represented Gujranwala, Sialkot, Quetta, Pakistan International Airlines and Islamabad. He also played for Sialkot Stallions and Quetta Bears in limited-overs cricket, and represented Pakistan Under-19s and United Bank Limited.

Imran established himself as a fast bowler in domestic cricket. In January 2005, playing for Sialkot Stallions in the ABN-AMRO Cup, he took 4 wickets for 47 runs as Stallions beat Lahore Lions by 131 runs to reach the semi-finals.

In October 2016, playing for Pakistan International Airlines in the 2016–17 Quaid-e-Azam Trophy, Imran took career-best innings figures of 7 wickets for 20 runs against Karachi Whites.

Imran played 54 first-class, 28 List A and seven Twenty20 matches between 2002 and 2017, taking 215 wickets in first-class cricket.
