= 2009–10 Quaid-e-Azam Trophy =

Cricket tournament

- Dates: 10 October 2009 – 23 December 2009
- Administrator: Pakistan Cricket Board
- Cricket format: First-class
- Tournament format(s): Two round-robin groups and final
- Host: Pakistan
- Champions: Karachi Blues
- Participants: 22
- Matches: 111
- Official website: www.pcb.com.pk

The 2009–10 Quaid-e-Azam Trophy was one of two first-class domestic cricket competitions that were held in Pakistan during the 2009–10 season. It was the 52nd edition of the Quaid-e-Azam Trophy, contested by 22 teams representing regional cricket associations and departments, (Note: The top level of domestic cricket in Pakistan was historically played by teams representing regional cricket associations and departments, which were owned and run by corporations, institutions or government departments.) and was followed in the schedule by the Pentangular Cup, contested by the top two regions and departments in the Quaid-e-Azam Trophy and a Rest of Pakistan team.

The format of the competition remained the same as the previous season, with the teams split into two groups of eleven – nine departmental and two regional teams in Group A, and eleven regional teams in Group B – playing four-day matches in a round-robin and a five-day final between the top teams in each group to determine the winner. In a change from 2007–08, the bottom two departmental teams were relegated to the Patron's Trophy (Grade II) competition for the following season.

Karachi Blues beat Habib Bank Limited by 141 runs in the final to win the trophy. In a low scoring match, Habib Bank, chasing a victory target of 208, were bowled out for just 66 runs in the fourth innings.

== Group stage ==
The top teams in the round-robin group stage (highlighted) advanced to the final.

Group A
Team	Pld	W	L	D	A	Pts
Habib Bank Ltd.	10	8	1	1	0	66
Sui Northern Gas Pipelines Ltd.	10	6	2	2	0	48
National Bank of Pakistan	10	5	3	2	0	48
Pakistan International Airlines	10	4	1	5	0	45
Water and Power Dev. Auth.	10	4	1	5	0	42
Zarai Taraqiati Bank Ltd.	10	4	2	4	0	42
Karachi Whites	10	4	5	1	0	36
Khan Research Labs.	10	2	3	5	0	21
Sui Southern Gas Corp. (R)	10	1	4	5	0	12
Pakistan Customs (R)	10	1	9	0	0	9
Lahore Shalimar	10	0	7	3	0	0

Group B
Team	Pld	W	L	D	A	Pts
Karachi Blues	10	6	1	3	0	60
Sialkot	10	5	2	4	0	51
Rawalpindi	10	5	2	3	0	48
Islamabad	10	4	3	3	0	39
Multan	10	4	3	3	0	36
Faisalabad	10	2	2	6	0	30
Lahore Ravi	10	3	3	4	0	30
Peshawar	10	2	5	3	0	18
Hyderabad	10	1	5	4	0	18
Quetta	10	2	5	3	0	15
Abbottabad	10	1	5	4	0	15

(R) Relegated to the Patron's Trophy for 2010–11.

Position determined by total points, most matches won after having a lead on first innings, fewest matches lost, followed by adjusted net run rate (matches with no result, i.e. those where both teams did not complete their first innings, were disregarded); matches finishing in a draw were decided on first innings scores, with points awarded as follows:
- Win = 9 points
- Win having tied or trailed on first innings = 6 points
- Draw having led on first innings = 3 points
- Loss, draw having trailed or with no result on first innings, or abandoned without a ball bowled = 0 points

== Final ==
21–23 December 2009
Scorecard

Karachi Blues	v	Habib Bank Limited
215 (55.3 overs); Shahzaib Hasan 67 (69); Abdur Rehman 4/52 (17.3 overs)		195 (60.4 overs); Taufeeq Umar 100* (173); Tanvir Ahmed 5/85 (22 overs)
187 (52.1 overs); Asim Kamal 50* (106); Abdur Rehman 3/14 (10 overs)		66 (21 overs); Saleem Elahi 15 (25); Mohammad Sami 6/38 (11 overs)

Karachi Blues won by 141 runs
National Stadium, Karachi
Umpires: Kaukab Butt and Zameer Haider
Player of the match: Mohammad Sami (Karachi Blues) and Tanvir Ahmed (Karachi Blues)

- Karachi Blues won the toss and elected to bat.
