= Fazal Subhan =

Pakistani cricketer (born 1988)

Personal information
- Full name: Fazal Subhan
- Born: 1 January 1988 (age 38); Karachi, Sindh, Pakistan
- Batting: Right-handed
- Bowling: Right-arm fast-medium
- Role: Batsman

Domestic team information
- Years: Team
- Karachi Blues
- Karachi Dolphins
- Karachi Whites
- Habib Bank Limited
- Saracens Sports Club

Career statistics
Competition	First-class	List A	Twenty20
Matches	40	39	9
Runs scored	2,301	858	143
Batting average	32.87	22.57	20.42
100s/50s	5/11	1/6	0/2
Top score	207	102	53
Balls bowled	99	6	–
Wickets	0	0	–
Bowling average	–	–	–
5 wickets in innings	0	0	–
10 wickets in match	0	0	–
Best bowling	–	–	–
Catches/stumpings	23/–	10/–	5/–
- Source: Cricinfo, 3 May 2026

Fazal Subhan (born 1 January 1988) is a Pakistani former cricketer. He was born in Karachi, Sindh, and has played domestic cricket in Pakistan for Karachi Blues, Karachi Whites, Karachi Dolphins and Habib Bank Limited.

Subhan represented Pakistan Under-19s in a youth one-day series against India in 2006. He made his first-class debut for Karachi Blues against Pakistan International Airlines in the 2007–08 Quaid-e-Azam Trophy, and his List A debut for Karachi Dolphins against Zarai Taraqiati Bank Limited in March 2008.

One of Subhan's early notable first-class innings came in the 2009–10 Quaid-e-Azam Trophy, when he scored 107 for Karachi Whites against National Bank of Pakistan at the NBP Sports Complex, Karachi. He shared substantial partnerships with Mohtashim Ali and Afsar Nawaz as Karachi Whites built a first-innings total of 486 and went on to win by an innings and 87 runs.

In the 2013–14 Quaid-e-Azam Trophy, he made 155 against Abbottabad, sharing a 283-run opening stand with Asif Zakir for Karachi's regional side. The following season he produced the highest score of his first-class career, making 207 for Karachi Dolphins against Zarai Taraqiati Bank Limited in the 2014–15 Quaid-e-Azam Trophy Gold League.

Subhan's only List A century came in the 2013–14 One Day Cup, when he scored 102 in a chase of 220 against Lahore Lions. He added a crucial 82-run sixth-wicket partnership with Ahmed Iqbal as Karachi Dolphins recovered from 98 for 5 to win by one wicket. In the same competition's semi-final, he scored 84 as Karachi Dolphins beat Karachi Zebras by nine wickets to reach the final.

He made his Twenty20 debut for Karachi Blues against Peshawar in the 2016–17 National T20 Cup. Overall, Subhan has played 40 first-class matches, scoring 2,301 runs at a batting average of 32.87, with five centuries and 11 half-centuries. In 39 List A matches, he has scored 858 runs, including one century and six fifties, while in nine Twenty20 matches he has scored 143 runs with a highest score of 53.

In 2019, after the end of Pakistan's departmental cricket structure, Subhan said in a widely circulated interview that he had taken up driving a pickup truck in Karachi to support his family. He later returned to recognized senior cricket, appearing for Saracens Sports Club in Sri Lanka's major limited-overs competition in 2022 and for Karachi Region Blues in the 2023–24 National T20 Cup.
