= Hamza Ghanchi =

Pakistani cricketer (born 1994)

Personal information
- Born: 17 December 1994 (age 31); Karachi, Pakistan
- Batting: Left-handed
- Bowling: Right-arm offbreak

Domestic team information
- Years: Team
- 2013-2017: Karachi
- Source: ESPNcricinfo, 8 October 2016

Hamza Ghanchi (born 17 December 1994) is a Pakistani cricketer. He made his first-class debut for Karachi Whites in the 2013–14 Quaid-e-Azam Trophy on 5 December 2013. On 8 October 2016 in the 2016–17 Quaid-e-Azam Trophy match against National Bank of Pakistan, he scored a triple century in the first innings, finishing 300 not out. He became the third-youngest Pakistani cricketer to make a triple century in a first-class match. However, he only played in 19 first-class matches, the last one being in the 2017–18 season.
