= Jahanzeb Khan =

Pakistani cricketer (1953–2020)

Personal information
- Full name: Khawaja Jehanzeb Sadiq
- Born: 12 May 1953; Karachi, Sindh, Pakistan
- Died: 6 December 2020 (aged 67)
- Batting: Right-handed
- Bowling: Right-arm medium-fast
- Role: Bowler

Domestic team information
- Years: Team
- 1972/73: Karachi Greens
- 1974/75: Karachi Blues
- 1974/75: Sind
- 1975/76–1987/88: National Bank of Pakistan

Career statistics
Competition	First-class	List A
Matches	60	20
Runs scored	312	29
Batting average	5.67	5.80
100s/50s	0/0	0/0
Top score	30*	12*
Balls bowled	6,646	744
Wickets	120	18
Bowling average	29.63	27.55
5 wickets in innings	2	0
10 wickets in match	0	0
Best bowling	5/28	3/22
Catches/stumpings	25/–	0/–
- Source: Cricinfo, 1 May 2026

Jahanzeb Khan (12 May 1953 – 6 December 2020) was a Pakistani cricketer. Khan was a right-handed batsman who bowled right-arm medium-fast. He was born in Karachi, Sindh, and played domestic cricket in Pakistan for Karachi Greens, Karachi Blues, Sind and National Bank of Pakistan.

Born into a family which had originated from Punjab in British India, Khan was educated at Ayesha Bawany School in Karachi. He played for D. J. Science College and Rangers Cricket Club before being introduced to first-class cricket with Karachi Greens in the 1972–73 BCCP Patron's Trophy. In the 1974–75 season, he also represented Sind and Sind A, and impressed against National Bank of Pakistan with figures of 4 for 38 for Karachi Blues in the Patron's Trophy and 4 for 70 for Sind A in the Quaid-e-Azam Trophy, performances which led National Bank to recruit him.

Khan's best first-class bowling figures came in the first round of the 1978–79 BCCP Patron's Trophy, when he took 5 for 28 against Hyderabad at Niaz Stadium. Later in the same season, in the final of the 1978–79 Quaid-e-Azam Trophy, he took 5 for 41 in the first innings and 4 for 39 in the second against Habib Bank Limited, finishing with match figures of 9 for 80 as National Bank won by 384 runs at the National Stadium.

As a lower-order batsman, Khan's highest first-class score was an unbeaten 30 against Karachi in the 1980–81 Quaid-e-Azam Trophy. Overall, he played in 60 first-class matches, taking 120 wickets at a bowling average of 29.63, while in 20 List A matches he took 18 wickets at 27.55. After his playing career, he remained employed by National Bank of Pakistan until his retirement in 2013. He died of cardiac arrest on 6 December 2020.
