= Nasir Ali =

Nasir Ali may refer to:

- Nasir Ali (field hockey) (born 1959), Pakistani field hockey player
- Nasir Ali (cricketer) (born 1994), Pakistani cricketer
- Nasir Ali (kabaddi) (born 1982), Pakistani international kabaddi player
