= Khalid Alvi (cricketer) =

Pakistani cricketer (born 1957)

Personal information
- Born: 20 December 1957 (age 68); Karachi, Pakistan
- Source: Cricinfo, 18 October 2016

Khalid Alvi (born 20 December 1957) is a Pakistani former cricketer who played as a batsman. He played 59 first-class cricket matches for several domestic teams in Pakistan between 1971 and 1986.

He made his highest score of 219 for Karachi against Railways in November 1980, when he put on 418 for the first wicket with Kamal Najamuddin.

== See also ==
- List of Pakistan Automobiles Corporation cricketers
