= Kamal Najamuddin =

Pakistani cricketer

Personal information
- Born: 24 October 1954 (age 72); Karachi, Sindh, Pakistan
- Batting: Right-handed
- Role: Wicketkeeper-batsman

Domestic team information
- Years: Team
- 1969-70: National Bank of Pakistan
- 1970-71 to 1986-87: Karachi
- 1974-75: Sindh

Career statistics
| Competition | First-class | List A |
|---|---|---|
| Matches | 60 | 8 |
| Runs scored | 2837 | 154 |
| Batting average | 28.65 | 19.25 |
| 100s/50s | 5/10 | 0/0 |
| Top score | 179 | 42 |
| Balls bowled | 12 | – |
| Wickets | 0 | – |
| Bowling average | – | – |
| 5 wickets in innings | – | – |
| 10 wickets in match | – | n/a |
| Best bowling | – | – |
| Catches/stumpings | 100/17 | 5/1 |
- Source: Cricket Archive, 24 February 2015

Kamal Najamuddin (born 24 October 1954) is a Pakistani former cricketer who played first-class cricket for several teams in Pakistan from 1970 to 1987.

Kamal Najamuddin was a wicket-keeper batsman who usually opened the batting. He played a first-class match in 1969–70 at the age of 15 purely as a batsman, and another in 1970–71 as a wicket-keeper, without batting in either. In his second match of the 1971–72 season, opening and keeping wicket for Karachi Whites, he made 45 and 107 not out.

He continued to play for various Karachi teams and the Sindh cricket team. He had his best season with the bat in 1980–81, when in nine matches he made 645 runs at an average of 40.31, with two centuries. He made his highest score of 179 for Karachi against Pakistan Railways, when he put on 418 for the first wicket with Khalid Alvi.

In 1982-83 Najamuddin made 10 dismissals (nine caught, one stumped) in Karachi's victory over Lahore City. In 1983-84 he played only three matches, all for Karachi Greens, scoring 86, 111 not out, 108 not out, 69 and 0.
