= Salman Butt =

Pakistani cricketer

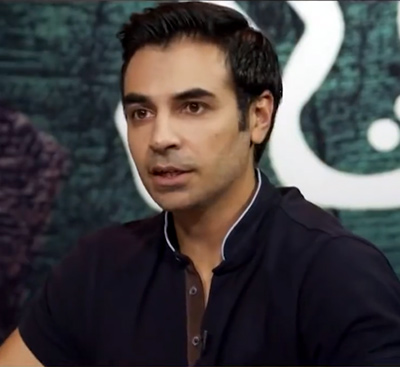
- Salman Butt in 2019

Personal information
- Born: 7 October 1984 (age 42); Lahore, Punjab, Pakistan
- Height: 1.70 m (5 ft 7 in)
- Batting: Left-handed
- Bowling: Right-arm off spin
- Role: Opening batsman

International information
- National side: Pakistan (2003–2010)
- Test debut (cap 178): 3 September 2003 v Bangladesh
- Last Test: 26 August 2010 v England
- ODI debut (cap 150): 22 September 2004 v West Indies
- Last ODI: 19 June 2010 v India
- ODI shirt no.: 1
- T20I debut (cap 18): 2 September 2007 v Bangladesh
- Last T20I: 6 July 2010 v Australia

Domestic team information
- Years: Team
- 2000/01–2004/05: Lahore Whites
- 2001/02: Lahore Blues
- 2000/01–2007/08: National Bank of Pakistan
- 2006/07: Lahore Shalimar (squad no. 8)
- 2004/05–2006/07: Lahore Eagles
- 2008: Kolkata Knight Riders
- 2009: Lahore Lions
- 2019: Lahore Qalandars
- 2019: Central Punjab

Career statistics
Competition	Test	ODI	FC	LA
Matches	33	78	121	202
Runs scored	1,889	2,725	8,020	8,432
Batting average	30.46	36.82	39.90	46.32
100s/50s	3/10	8/14	22/32	23/47
Top score	122	136	290	150*
Balls bowled	137	69	1,096	547
Wickets	1	0	13	10
Bowling average	106.00	–	56.30	50.00
5 wickets in innings	0	–	0	0
10 wickets in match	0	–	0	0
Best bowling	1/36	–	4/82	2/26
Catches/stumpings	12/–	20/–	50/–	56/–
- Source: ESPNcricinfo, 23 March 2019

Salman Butt (Punjabi:سلمان بٹ; born 7 October 1984) is a former Pakistani cricketer and captain who played for Pakistan national cricket team between 2003 and 2010, before getting banned for five years for his involvement in a 2010 spot-fixing scandal. Butt was a member of the Pakistan team that won the 2009 ICC World Twenty20.

He had been a regular Test and ODI left-handed opening batsman. He made his Test debut on 3 September 2003 in the third Test against Bangladesh, and a year later, made his ODI debut against West Indies on 22 September 2004. He was appointed captain of the Pakistan Test squad on 16 July 2010. He was known for his command in offside area.

His noticeable performance was against India, registering 5 ODI centuries in 21 innings with an average of 52.

On 29 August 2010, he was implicated in allegations of spot-fixing. On 31 August 2010, he was stripped of the Pakistan captaincy, and removed from the ODI squad pending criminal proceedings. He was banned from playing cricket for ten years, of which five years was a suspended sentence. In November 2011, he was convicted and jailed for 30 months for conspiracy charges relating to the spot-fixing, along with Mohammad Amir and Mohammad Asif. On 21 June 2012, he was released from jail.

In August 2015, bans on Butt and fellow conspirators Mohammad Amir and Mohammad Asif were lifted by the International Cricket Council, allowing them to return to all forms of cricket from 2 September 2015.

== Early life and education ==
Butt was born in Lahore, into an ethnic Kashmiri family, to Zulfikar Ali Butt, who runs a farming business, the eldest of three children and grew up in "relative luxury", described by his father as a "practising Muslim who prays five times a day." He is an alumnus of the Beaconhouse School System.

When Butt's father divorced his mother and left the home he had to bear the financial responsibilities of his sisters' higher education.

His son Aaliyan Suleman is also a cricketer, in 2022 being named in the Central Punjab's Whites Under-16 team.

== Cricket career ==
=== Early career ===
Butt started in the Under-17s and quickly progressed through Under-19 level, although at that time he was much younger than the age limits suggest, making his senior debut for Lahore Whites in 2000 aged only 15. His talent was noticed immediately, which led to him being given a place in the Pakistan A team against England soon after. However, instead of rushing straight for the limelight of international cricket, he got his head down and consolidated by playing consistently for his region and the youth teams, until the Pakistan selectors finally drafted him in 2003.

=== International cricket ===
After his debut, Butt was dropped, and he struggled to regain his place due to some stiff competition for the openers' spots. He returned for the Champions' Trophy in 2004 and scored his first fifty for Pakistan in the Paktel Cup against Sri Lanka. In the ODI against India on 13 November 2004, as Pakistan chased down 292, he formed partnerships first with Shoaib Malik, putting on 113, and subsequently with Inzamam-Ul-Haq. Despite having retired for seven overs due to severe cramp, he returned to steer Pakistan home, finishing on 108 not out.

Yet 2005 saw little improvement, and doubts circulated about his defensive technique, causing him to be shuffled in and out of the side. But things started looking up again during the winter Test series against England, in which he scored a century and two fifties, with a more cautious attitude to his innings building than he had previously shown.

For his performances in 2008, he was named as 12th man in the World ODI XI by the ICC.

=== Appointment as Test captain ===
On 17 July 2010, the Pakistan Cricket Board appointed Butt as captain of the Pakistani Test squad in place of Shahid Afridi, who announced his retirement from Test cricket after Pakistan lost the first test match against Australia. He became the 28th captain of the Pakistani Test team and the fifth to lead them since January 2009.

On 23 July 2010, Salman Butt led Pakistan to victory against Australia in his first appearance as Pakistan's test team captain.

=== Spot-fixing scandal ===
In August 2010, Butt and two other players, Mohammad Amir and Mohammad Asif, were among those named by a News of the World sting where undercover reporters paid an agent loosely affiliated with several players on Pakistan's squad a bribe in return for detailed information on when no-balls would be bowled.

Butt, Amir, and Asif were dropped from the Pakistan team for the limited-over series (two Twenty20 games, and five ODI games). However, on 2 September 2010, after the warm-up List A game between Pakistan and Somerset, the International Cricket Council announced that they had suspended Asif, Amir and Butt under the provisions of the ICC's Anti-Corruption Code. The statement from the ICC stated that the three players were charged "under various offences under Article 2 of the ICC Anti-Corruption Code for Players and Player Support Personnel relating to alleged irregular behaviour during, and in relation to, the fourth Test between England and Pakistan at Lord's last month".

Later it became known that Butt and the other two players implicated in the scandal were in possession of bills with the same serial numbers as those the reporter had paid Majeed earlier. Butt was provisionally suspended from playing International Cricket due to the fact that the ICC wanted his name cleared before he resumed playing cricket. In late September, Butt filed an appeal to the ICC asking them to lift his temporary suspension. After Mohammad Asif had dropped his appeal against the charges so that he could understand the charges filed against him, Butt said he was determined to prove his innocence and that his appeal was going to go ahead.

In an interview with the Associated Press, Butt stated "I do not want to comment on The News of the World because everybody knows what kind of paper it is. Everybody knows about its reputation across the world." He also stated that he was linked to Mazhar Majeed as a player agent but not in any spot-fixing. He also stated that the video can easily be edited and modified and manipulated. One day before the hearing, Butt continued to state his innocence. The tribunal announced that a verdict on the decision had been deferred to 5 February 2011 and that the ICC also stated that the tribunal would rule on charges pertaining to the third Test match between England and Pakistan. Butt was the only player before the tribunal to face these additional charges.

On 5 February 2011, the three-man tribunal delivered its verdict. One charge was dismissed against Butt from the third Test match (batting out a maiden over), but the other charges (failing to report an advance from the third Test match and ordering Asif and Amir to bowl no-balls in the fourth Test) were proved, and Butt was banned from the sport of cricket for ten years, five of which were suspended should he not commit any further offences and participate in a Pakistani Cricket Board anti-corruption program.

=== Return to domestic cricket ===
In January 2016, the PCB allowed Butt to play in the National One Day Cup, in which he played for WAPDA and scored 536 in 7 matches at an average of 107, ending up one of the leading run-scorers in the tournament. He was the man of the match in the final of the 2016–17 Quaid-e-Azam Trophy, scoring a century in both innings. WAPDA won the title. During the 2017–18 National T20 Cup he jointly with Kamran Akmal set the world record opening partnership in T20 history of unbeaten 209 runstand, surpassing the previous highest opening partnership of 207 in any form of T20 cricket held by Joe Denly and Daniel Bell-Drummond. The record runstand was also the third highest partnership in terms of runs for any wicket in T20 history.

In April 2018, he was named in Sindh's squad for the 2018 Pakistan Cup. He was the leading run-scorer in the 2018–19 Quaid-e-Azam One Day Cup, with 559 runs in ten matches. He was also the leading run-scorer for Water and Power Development Authority in the 2018–19 Quaid-e-Azam Trophy, with 610 runs in ten matches. In March 2019, he was named as the captain of Khyber Pakhtunkhwa's squad for the 2019 Pakistan Cup.

In September 2019, he was named in Central Punjab's squad for the 2019–20 Quaid-e-Azam Trophy tournament. In September 2020, Butt refused to take part in the 2020–21 National T20 Cup, after he was demoted from the team's first XI.

In October 2020, Butt withdrew his name from Quaid-e-Azam Trophy to explore a future in a non-playing role in the game. Reportedly, PCB has offered him a commentator's role for the broadcast of the first-class tournament.

== Playing style ==
Butt worked hard for his runs, not indulging in too many big hits; his statistics show the low number of 19 international sixes to date (1 September 2010) of which he's scored 10 in Twenty20 cricket, 7 in One-Day Internationals and only six in Test cricket. He scored a lot of his runs between backward point and extra cover. He used his superb wrist work to angle the bat, placing the ball into gaps using the pace of the ball to his advantage; a very good technique for ODIs where it is best to keep the scoreboard ticking all the time. He also had the ability to cut the ball very fine down to third man if there are no slips, especially against spin bowlers, as he showed to great effect in his above-mentioned innings of 108 not out. These were his specialties, but he also has a large range of shots. However, many commentators have expressed that his defensive technique had flaws, and that he was prone to playing at balls outside off-stump which should be left.

== Post-retirement ==
=== Umpiring and coaching career ===
In June 2021, Salman Butt joined the PCB's umpiring and match referee phase 1 course.

In May 2022, he was appointed as a consultant coach of the Singapore national cricket team.

=== Commentary career ===
In April 2025, several PSL franchise owners expressed strong dissatisfaction with the inclusion of Butt in the PSL 10 Urdu commentary panel. Despite the franchises submitting a joint letter requesting that individuals with unethical backgrounds not be included, the PCB ignored the request. Butt has since held roles in PCB Digital and had briefly been appointed as an advisor to the selection committee, triggering public backlash.

For the 2025 United Arab Emirates T20I Tri-Nation Series in Sharjah featuring Pakistan, Afghanistan, and the UAE, Butt was made part of the commentary panel.

== See also ==
- List of cricketers banned for match fixing

Preceded by Shahid Afridi	Pakistani national cricket captain (Tests); 2010	Succeeded by Misbah-ul-Haq
