= Sohaib Khan (Pakistani cricketer) =

Pakistani cricketer (born 1989)

Personal information
- Born: 1 July 1989 (age 37); Karachi, Pakistan
- Source: Cricinfo, 1 November 2015

Sohaib Khan (born 1 July 1989) is a Pakistani first-class cricketer who plays for Karachi.
