= Mohammad Ismail (cricketer) =

Pakistani cricketer (born 1997)

Personal information
- Born: 13 January 1997 (age 29); Gujar Khan, Punjab, Pakistan
- Batting: Left-handed
- Bowling: Left arm slow medium

Domestic team information
- Years: Team
- 2017: National Bank of Pakistan
- 2017/2018: Rawalpindi
- 2020/2021: Northern Punjab
- 2020/2021: Northern

Career statistics
Competition	FC	LA	T20
Matches	2	14	3
Runs scored	4	20	2
Batting average	1.33	5.00	–
100s/50s	0/0	0/1	0/0
Top score	4	6*	2*
Balls bowled	314	600	54
Wickets	4	17	3
Bowling average	65.25	35.94	26.33
5 wickets in innings	0	0	0
10 wickets in match	0	0	0
Best bowling	2/68	4/50	2/32
Catches/stumpings	–/–	7/–	1/–
- Source: Cricinfo, 10 October 2017

Mohammad Ismail (born 13 January 1997) is a Pakistani cricketer. He made his first-class debut for National Bank of Pakistan in the 2017–18 Quaid-e-Azam Trophy on 9 October 2017. He made his Twenty20 debut for Rawalpindi in the 2017–18 National T20 Cup on 23 November 2017. He made his List A debut for Rawalpindi in the 2018–19 Quaid-e-Azam One Day Cup on 6 September 2018. In January 2021, he was named in Northern's squad for the 2020–21 Pakistan Cup.
