= Gohar Shah =

Pakistani cricketer and sports executive (born 1995)

Personal information
- Full name: Syed Mohammed Gohar Hussain Shah
- Born: 4 April 1995 (age 31); Lahore, Punjab, Pakistan
- Batting: Right-handed
- Bowling: Left-arm fast-medium
- Role: Bowler

Domestic team information
- Years: Team
- 2016/17: National Bank of Pakistan
- 2016–2018: Loughborough MCCU

Career statistics
Competition	First-class
Matches	2
Runs scored	1
Batting average	0.50
100s/50s	0/0
Top score	1*
Balls bowled	376
Wickets	1
Bowling average	265.00
5 wickets in innings	0
10 wickets in match	0
Best bowling	1/90
Catches/stumpings	1/–
- Source: Cricinfo, 15 April 2026

Syed Mohammed Gohar Hussain Shah (born 4 April 1995) is a Pakistani sports executive and former cricketer who has been chief executive officer of Multan Sultans since 2026. He was born in Lahore, Punjab, Pakistan.

Shah represented Lahore East Zone Whites Under-19s and Lahore Ravi Under-19s before making his first-class debut for National Bank of Pakistan against Khan Research Laboratories in the 2016–17 Quaid-e-Azam Trophy. He made his second and final first-class appearance later in the same competition against United Bank Limited, taking the only wicket of his senior career when he dismissed Hammad Azam. In recognised senior cricket, Shah did not score a century or take a five-wicket haul.

While in England, Shah also played for Loughborough MCCU against Australian Universities in 2016 and 2018. Later, a back injury curtailed his ambitions of becoming a professional cricketer.

After his playing career, Shah studied at Loughborough University, graduating with a BSc in Business, Economics and Finance in 2018 and an MSc in Finance and Investment in 2019. In March 2026, following CD Ventures' majority acquisition of the Pakistan Super League franchise then known as Sialkot Stallionz, Shah was appointed chief executive officer of the rebranded Multan Sultans.
