= Muhammad Asad (cricketer) =

Pakistani cricketer (born 1998)

Personal information
- Full name: Muhammad Asad
- Born: 8 August 1998 (age 28); Karachi, Pakistan
- Source: Cricinfo, 12 October 2017

Muhammad Asad (born 8 August 1998) is a Pakistani cricketer. He made his first-class debut for Karachi Whites in the 2016–17 Quaid-e-Azam Trophy on 29 October 2016. Prior to his first-class debut, he was named in Pakistan's squad for the 2016 Under-19 Cricket World Cup.
