= Haris Asif =

Pakistani cricketer

Personal information
- Full name: Haris Asif
- Source: ESPNcricinfo, 20 November 2016

Haris Asif is a Pakistani cricketer. He made his first-class debut for Khan Research Laboratories in the 2016–17 Quaid-e-Azam Trophy on 12 November 2016.
