= Mohammad Aftab =

Pakistani cricketer (born 1996)

Personal information
- Born: 14 August 1996 (age 30); Lahore, Pakistan
- Batting: Left-handed
- Bowling: Left-arm medium fast
- Source: ESPNcricinfo, 27 September 2023

Mohammad Aftab (born 14 August 1996) is a Pakistani cricketer. He made his first-class debut for Lahore Blues in the 2016–17 Quaid-e-Azam Trophy on 7 October 2016.
