= Hasnain Khan =

Pakistani cricketer (born 1996)

Personal information
- Born: 9 January 1996 (age 29)

Domestic team information
- Years: Team
- 2016: FATA
- Source: Cricinfo, 18 September 2021

Hasnain Khan (born 9 January 1996) is a Pakistani cricketer. He made his first-class debut for Federally Administered Tribal Areas in the 2016–17 Quaid-e-Azam Trophy on 5 November 2016. On debut, he was dismissed without scoring in the first innings, before scoring 25 runs in the second innings. Khan has also played club cricket for Kohat cricket team.
