= Atif Jabbar =

Pakistani cricketer

Personal information
- Full name: Rana Mohammad Atif Jabbar
- Born: 15 June 1990 (age 36); Sheikhupura, Punjab, Pakistan
- Batting: Right-handed
- Bowling: Right-arm medium-fast
- Role: Bowler

Domestic team information
- Years: Team
- 2011/12: Sialkot Stallions
- 2012/13–2013/14: United Bank Limited
- 2013/14: Dera Murad Jamali Ibexes
- 2017: Lahore Blues
- 2017/18: Faisalabad
- 2016/17–2018/19: National Bank of Pakistan

Career statistics
Competition	First-class	List A	Twenty20
Matches	29	20	12
Runs scored	164	33	2
Batting average	5.85	16.50	0.66
100s/50s	0/0	0/0	0/0
Top score	32	10*	1
Balls bowled	4,913	842	240
Wickets	99	27	7
Bowling average	28.20	25.22	45.57
5 wickets in innings	5	0	0
10 wickets in match	2	0	0
Best bowling	7/74	4/48	3/25
Catches/stumpings	9/–	2/–	2/–
- Source: Cricinfo, 13 April 2026

Rana Mohammad Atif Jabbar (born 15 June 1990) is a Pakistani former cricketer. Jabbar was a right-handed batsman who bowled right-arm medium-fast. He was born in Sheikhupura, Punjab.

Jabbar made his List A debut for the Sialkot Stallions against the Wolves in March 2012. Later that year, he made his first-class debut for United Bank Limited against Habib Bank Limited. He made his Twenty20 debut for United Bank Limited against WAPDA in July 2013. During his domestic career, he also represented the Dera Murad Jamali Ibexes, National Bank of Pakistan, Faisalabad and Lahore Blues.

Jabbar's most notable performances came in the 2016–17 Quaid-e-Azam Trophy Super Eight. Playing for the National Bank of Pakistan, he took 7 for 74 in the second innings against United Bank Limited, giving him match figures of 11 for 114. He followed that by taking 5 for 43 and 5 for 50 against Khan Research Laboratories, recording another ten-wicket match haul of 10 for 93. His back-to-back ten-wicket hauls took his season tally to 50 wickets in 10 matches.

In March 2017, Jabbar was named in a 39-player emerging camp selected by the Pakistan Cricket Board. He was also the leading wicket-taker for the National Bank of Pakistan in the 2018–19 Quaid-e-Azam Trophy, with 21 dismissals in seven matches.
