= Tahir Khan (Pakistani cricketer) =

Pakistani cricketer (born 1981)

Personal information
- Full name: Mohammad Tahir Khan
- Born: 9 January 1981 (age 45); Karachi, Sindh, Pakistan
- Batting: Right-handed
- Bowling: Right-arm off break
- Role: Bowler

Domestic team information
- Years: Team
- 1999/00–2004/05: Karachi Whites
- 2001/02: Karachi Blues
- 2003/04: Karachi
- 2004/05: Karachi Dolphins
- 2004/05–2016/17: Pakistan International Airlines
- 2005/06–2006/07: Karachi Zebras
- 2006/07: Sindh
- 2008/09–2014/15: Karachi Dolphins
- Last FC: 12 November 2016 Pakistan International Airlines v Sui Northern Gas Pipelines Limited
- LA debut: 22 March 2000 Karachi Whites v Hyderabad
- Last LA: 29 December 2016 Pakistan International Airlines v Habib Bank Limited

Career statistics
Competition	First-class	List A	Twenty20
Matches	103	93	22
Runs scored	2932	611	60
Batting average	28.46	17.45	10.00
100s/50s	1/15	0/2	0/0
Top score	141*	65	19
Balls bowled	16935	4814	428
Wickets	324	95	18
Bowling average	27.29	37.40	29.44
5 wickets in innings	13	1	0
10 wickets in match	1	0	0
Best bowling	8/48	5/17	2/6
Catches/stumpings	99/–	41/–	6/–
- Source: ESPNCricinfo, 5 July 2026

Mohammad Tahir Khan (born 9 January 1981) is a Pakistani former cricketer. Khan is a right-handed batsman who bowls right-arm off break. He was born in Karachi, Sindh.

Khan made his first-class debut for Karachi Whites in the 1999–2000 Quaid-e-Azam Trophy. He made his List A debut for Karachi Whites against Hyderabad in the NBP Cup on 22 March 2000, and made his Twenty20 debut for Karachi Zebras against Rawalpindi Rams in the ABN-AMRO Twenty-20 Cup on 24 February 2006.

During his domestic career, Khan represented Karachi Whites, Karachi Blues, Karachi, Sindh, Karachi Zebras, Karachi Dolphins and Pakistan International Airlines. He also represented Pakistan A and was selected in Pakistan's squad for the Hong Kong Sixes in 2005.

Khan established himself as a successful off-spinner in domestic cricket. In October 2004, playing for Karachi Whites, he took career-best innings figures of 8 wickets for 48 runs against Karachi Blues in the Quaid-e-Azam Trophy.

In December 2013, playing for Pakistan International Airlines in the 2013–14 President's Trophy, Khan scored 141 not out and shared a seventh-wicket partnership of 294 with Sarfraz Ahmed against Zarai Taraqiati Bank Limited. In October 2014, he took 6 wickets for 40 runs for Pakistan International Airlines against Lahore Eagles in the 2014–15 Quaid-e-Azam Trophy.

Khan played 103 first-class, 93 List A and 22 Twenty20 matches between the 1999/00 and 2016/17 seasons, taking 324 wickets in first-class cricket.
