= Gauhar Hafeez =

Pakistani cricketer

Personal information
- Full name: Gauhar Hafeez
- Born: 26 December 1999 (age 26); Lahore, Pakistan
- Batting: Left-handed

Domestic team information
- Years: Team
- Lahore Eagles

Career statistics
Competition	FC	List-A
Matches	9	8
Runs scored	368	188
Batting average	20.44	23.50
100s/50s	0/2	0/1
Top score	71	79
Catches/stumpings	5/0	3/0
- Source: Cricinfo, 4 December 2025

Gauhar Hafeez (born 26 December 1999) is a Pakistani cricketer who has played for the Lahore Eagles in Pakistani domestic cricket. A left-handed batsman, he made his List A debut in January 2015 (aged 15), playing against the Multan Tigers in the Haier President's Silver Cup. in his third match, against Pakistan TV, he scored 79 runs from 60 balls, opening the batting with Tayyab Tahir. In December 2015, Gauhar was named captain of the Pakistan under-19s for the 2016 Under-19 World Cup in Bangladesh.

He made his first-class debut for Lahore Whites in the 2016–17 Quaid-e-Azam Trophy on 15 October 2016.
