= Mohammad Nisar =

Pakistani cricketer

Personal information
- Full name: Mohammad Nisar
- Source: ESPNcricinfo, 15 November 2016

Mohammad Nisar is a Pakistani cricketer. He made his first-class debut for Federally Administered Tribal Areas in the 2016–17 Quaid-e-Azam Trophy on 12 November 2016.
