= Obaidullah (Pakistani cricketer) =

Pakistani cricketer (born 1992)

Personal information
- Born: 4 June 1992 (age 34); Peshawar, Pakistan
- Source: ESPNcricinfo, 8 October 2016

Obaidullah (born 4 June 1992) is a Pakistani cricketer. He made his first-class debut for Pakistan International Airlines in the 2016–17 Quaid-e-Azam Trophy on 7 October 2016. He made his Twenty20 debut for Peshawar in the 2017–18 National T20 Cup on 19 November 2017.
