= Mohammad Yasin (cricketer) =

Pakistani cricketer (born 1992)

Personal information
- Born: 10 April 1992 (age 34); Malakand, Pakistan
- Source: Cricinfo, 31 October 2016

Mohammad Yasin (born 10 April 1992) is a Pakistani cricketer. He made his first-class debut for Pakistan International Airlines in the 2016–17 Quaid-e-Azam Trophy on 29 October 2016.
