= Aaley Haider =

Pakistani cricketer (born 1973)

Syed Aaley Haider, born at Karachi, Pakistan, on 4 December 1973, is a former cricketer who played first-class cricket in Pakistan for several teams, and also played for and captained the Pakistan Under-19 cricket team in two under-19 Test matches in 1991-92.

A right-hand batsman and an occasional off-break bowler, Aaley Haider came to prominence by scoring 103 in his first youth Test match in 1991-92 and leading his side to an innings victory over the England Under-19 cricket team. He missed the second match of the three-match series, which was ruined by rain, but returned for the third game, which the English team won by an innings.

He also led the under-19 side to a comprehensive 3-0 victory in the One Day International series that followed the under-19 Tests.

In the same 1991-92 season he made his first List A appearances in important Pakistani cricket, playing at that stage for Karachi Whites cricket team. He made his first-class debut two seasons later. In a 12-year career, he played most of his cricket for Allied Bank and scored 3,901 first-class runs at an average of 29 runs per innings, with six centuries.

He is now an umpire and stood in matches in the 2016–17 Quaid-e-Azam Trophy.
