= Ataullah (cricketer) =

Pakistani cricketer (born 1986)

Personal information
- Born: 2 February 1986 (age 40); Rajanpur, Pakistan
- Source: Cricinfo, 21 December 2015

Ataullah (born 2 February 1986) is a Pakistani former first-class cricketer who played for Rawalpindi.

== Biography ==
Born in Rajanpur, Punjab, Pakistan, Ataullah was a right-handed batter and right-arm fast-medium bowler. His career has spanned various teams, including Bahawalpur Stags (Twenty20, 2012–15), National Bank of Pakistan (Twenty20, FC, and ListA, 2013–19), Lahore Eagles (Twenty20, 2013–14), Baluchistan (Twenty20, 2014), Lahore Blues (Twenty20, 2015–16), and Rawalpindi (FC, 2016–18; ListA, 2017–18).

In his first-class career (2012–19), he took 154 wickets, with a best of 7–92. He averaged 21.44, achieving eight five-wicket hauls in an innings and twice claiming ten-wicket matches in a match, with a strike rate of 42.39.

In his List A career (2012–19), Ataullah took 25 wickets. His best was 4-28, and he averaged 34.36, achieving four-wicket hauls in an innings twice, with a strike rate of 37.80 and economy rate of 5.45.

In his Twenty20 career (2012–16), he took 23 wickets, with a best of 3–13. He had an average of 21.13, a strike rate of 16.86, and an economy rate of 7.51.

In a 2013 President's Trophy match, Ataullah took 10 wickets for 122 runs, which helped his team, the National Bank of Pakistan, secure a victory over United Bank Limited in Islamabad.
