= Naved Sarwar =

Pakistani cricketer (born 1989)

Personal information
- Born: 17 November 1989 (age 36); Sialkot, Pakistan
- Source: ESPNcricinfo, 4 October 2016

Naved Sarwar (born 17 November 1989) is a Pakistani first-class cricketer who plays for National Bank of Pakistan.
