= Ahmed Iqbal =

Pakistani cricketer (born 1989)

Personal information
- Born: 28 March 1989 (age 37)
- Source: Cricinfo, 16 October 2017

Ahmed Iqbal (born 28 March 1989) is a Pakistani cricketer. He made his first-class debut for Karachi Whites in the 2007–08 Quaid-e-Azam Trophy on 13 December 2007.
