= Raza-ul-Hasan =

Pakistani cricketer (born 1987)

Personal information
- Born: 26 November 1987 (age 38); Karachi, Pakistan
- Batting: Right-handed
- Bowling: Right-arm Offbreak
- Source: ESPNcricinfo, 10 October 2016

Raza-ul-Hasan (born 26 November 1987) is a Pakistani cricketer. He made his first-class debut for Karachi Whites in the 2009–10 Quaid-e-Azam Trophy on 9 December 2009. In January 2021, he was named in Balochistan's squad for the 2020–21 Pakistan Cup.
