= Abdur Rehman (cricketer, born 1989) =

Pakistani cricketer (born 1989)

Personal information
- Born: 31 July 1989 (age 37); Lahore, Pakistan
- Source: ESPNcricinfo, 3 October 2016

Abdur Rehman (born 31 July 1989) is a Pakistani first-class cricketer who plays for Khan Research Laboratories.
