= Nasir Ali (cricketer) =

Pakistani cricketer (born 1994)

Personal information
- Born: 30 January 1994 (age 32); Lahore, Pakistan
- Source: ESPNcricinfo, 18 October 2016

Nasir Ali (born 30 January 1994) is a Pakistani cricketer.

He made his first-class debut for Lahore Whites in the 2016–17 Quaid-e-Azam Trophy on 15 October 2016.
