= Sami Aslam =

Pakistani former cricketer

Personal information
- Full name: Sami Aslam
- Born: 12 December 1995 (age 30); Lahore, Punjab, Pakistan
- Batting: Left-handed
- Bowling: Right-arm off break
- Role: Opening batter

International information
- National side: Pakistan (2015–2017)
- Test debut (cap 220): 28 April 2015 v Bangladesh
- Last Test: 6 October 2017 v Sri Lanka
- ODI debut (cap 202): 22 April 2015 v Bangladesh
- Last ODI: 1 September 2016 v England
- ODI shirt no.: 31

Domestic team information
- Years: Team
- 2012–2020: National Bank of Pakistan
- 2012–2020: Lahore Eagles
- 2023-present: Texas Super Kings

Career statistics
Competition	Test	ODI	FC	LA
Matches	13	4	52	70
Runs scored	758	78	3,110	3,225
Batting average	31.58	19.50	35.34	48.86
100s/50s	0/7	0/0	8/13	10/19
Top score	91	45	221	169
Balls bowled	–	–	48	60
Wickets	–	–	0	0
Bowling average	–	–	–	–
5 wickets in innings	–	–	–	–
10 wickets in match	–	–	–	–
Best bowling	–	–	–	–
Catches/stumpings	1/-	0/–	23/–	13/–
- Source: ESPNcricinfo, 8 December 2020

Sami Aslam (born 12 December 1995) is a Pakistani-born cricketer who played for the Pakistan national cricket team between 2015 and 2017 before joining Major League Cricket. He was a left-handed batsman and an occasional right-arm off spin bowler.

He is currently the second-highest run-scorer in U-19 ODI history with 1695 runs. He was part of the Pakistan Under-19 cricket team that took part in the 2012 ICC Under-19 Cricket World Cup in Australia. He was the captain of the team at the 2014 ICC Under-19 Cricket World Cup in the United Arab Emirates, where he led Pakistan to the finals of the tournament. In 2014 he was selected for PCB summer camp. He played his last series for Pakistan in October 2017 vs Sri Lanka.

In March 2019, he was named in Punjab's squad for the 2019 Pakistan Cup. In September 2019, he was named in Southern Punjab's squad for the 2019–20 Quaid-e-Azam Trophy tournament.

In November 2020, Aslam ended his career in Pakistan, with an aim of possibly representing the United States. He would be eligible to play for USA in November 2023. In June 2021, Aslam was selected in the players' draft ahead of the Minor League Cricket tournament.

In March 2023, Aslam was drafted to the Texas Super Kings in Round 5 for Major League Cricket.
