= Shehzad Azam =

Pakistani cricketer (1985–2022)

Personal information
- Full name: Shehzad Azam Rana
- Born: 1 November 1985; Sialkot, Punjab, Pakistan
- Died: 30 September 2022 (aged 36); Islamabad, Pakistan
- Batting: Right-handed
- Bowling: Right arm medium
- Source: Cricinfo, 24 November 2015

Shehzad Azam (1 November 1985 – 30 September 2022) was a Pakistani cricketer who played for Islamabad. He was the leading wicket-taker for Islamabad in the 2017–18 Quaid-e-Azam Trophy, with 26 dismissals in seven matches. He was also the leading wicket-taker for Islamabad in the 2018–19 Quaid-e-Azam One Day Cup, with nine dismissals in eight matches. He died on 30 September 2022 following cardiac arrest.
