= Sarmad Hameed =

Pakistani cricketer (born 1994)

Personal information
- Born: 28 May 1994 (age 32); Jhelum, Pakistan
- Batting: Right-handed
- Role: Batsman
- Source: Cricinfo, 21 December 2015

Sarmad Hameed (born 28 May 1994) is a Pakistani first-class cricketer who plays for Northern. He was the leading run-scorer for Rawalpindi in the 2017–18 Quaid-e-Azam Trophy, with 382 runs in seven matches. He made his Twenty20 debut on 30 September 2021, for Northern in the 2021–22 National T20 Cup.
