= Jamaluddin (cricketer) =

Pakistani cricketer (born 1985)

Personal information
- Full name: Jamaluddin
- Born: 4 November 1985 (age 40); Swat, Pakistan
- Batting: Right-handed
- Bowling: Right-arm off-spin
- Role: Batter
- Source: ESPNcricinfo, 24 October 2016

Jamaluddin (born 4 November 1985) is a Pakistani former cricketer. He made his first-class debut for Peshawar in the 2007–08 Quaid-e-Azam Trophy on 19 November 2007. In February 2021, he began to undertake coaching courses with the Pakistan Cricket Board.
