= Shahid Nawaz (Lahore cricketer) =

Pakistani cricketer (born 1996)

Personal information
- Born: 3 March 1996 (age 30); Faisalabad, Pakistan
- Source: ESPNcricinfo, 7 November 2016

Shahid Nawaz (born 3 March 1996) is a Pakistani cricketer. He made his first-class debut for Lahore Eagles in the 2014–15 Quaid-e-Azam Trophy on 12 October 2014.
