= Jaahid Ali =

Pakistani cricketer (born 1995)

Personal information
- Full name: Jaahid Shaukat Ali
- Born: 5 March 1995 (age 31); Karachi, Pakistan
- Batting: Right-handed
- Bowling: Right-arm offbreak
- Role: Batter

Domestic team information
- Years: Team
- 2013/14: State Bank
- 2014/15–2016/17: Karachi
- 2017/18–2018/19: Khan Research Labs
- 2018/19: Lahore
- 2019/20–2020/21: Sindh
- 2020: Lahore Qalandars

Career statistics
| Competition | FC | LA | T20 |
|---|---|---|---|
| Matches | 44 | 32 | 2 |
| Runs scored | 2,151 | 1,063 | 2 |
| Batting average | 27.93 | 34.29 | 2.00 |
| 100s/50s | 2/13 | 1/8 | 0/0 |
| Top score | 155 | 103 | 2 |
| Catches/stumpings | 31/– | 6/– | 1/– |
- Source: Cricinfo, 2 February 2025

Jaahid Shaukat Ali (born 5 March 1995) is a Pakistani cricket coach and former cricketer. He made his first-class debut for Karachi on 26 October 2015 in the 2015–16 Quaid-e-Azam Trophy.

In October 2017, he was named in Pakistan's squad for the 2017 Hong Kong Cricket Sixes. He was the leading run-scorer for Khan Research Laboratories (KRL) in the 2017–18 Quaid-e-Azam Trophy, with 355 runs in eight matches. He was also the leading run-scorer for KRL in the 2018–19 Quaid-e-Azam Trophy, with 484 runs in ten matches.

Having coached at the Bunbury Festival earlier in the year, Ali became talent pathway coach and academy batting lead at Kent in November 2023. During his time in the role he also worked as assistant coach for Pakistan Super League team Quetta Gladiators in 2024, then batting coach in 2025. In October 2025, having supported Kent's first-team in the 2025 season, Ali was named as the club's men's assistant coach for batting.
