= Mohammad Naeem (cricketer, born 1986) =

Pakistani cricketer (born 1986)

Personal information
- Born: 1 August 1986 (age 40); Dera Ismail Khan, Pakistan
- Batting: Left-handed
- Bowling: Slow left-arm orthodox
- Source: Cricinfo, 1 November 2015

Mohammad Naeem (born 1 August 1986) is a Pakistani first-class cricketer who plays for Federally Administered Tribal Areas.
