= Mohammad Asif (umpire) =

Pakistani cricket umpire (born 1973)

Personal information
- Born: 11 November 1973 (age 53); Sargodha, Pakistan

Umpiring information
- Source: Cricinfo, 16 October 2017

Mohammad Asif (born 11 November 1973) is a Pakistani cricket umpire. He has stood in domestic matches in the 2017–18 Quaid-e-Azam Trophy and the 2016–17 Regional One Day Cup. In December 2018, he was one of the on-field umpires for the final of the 2018–19 Quaid-e-Azam Trophy.
