= Aslam Bareach =

Pakistani cricket umpire (born 1976)

Personal information
- Full name: Mohammad Aslam Khan Bareach
- Born: 26 January 1976 (age 50); Quetta, Balochistan, Pakistan
- Role: Umpire

Umpiring information
- Source: ESPNcricinfo, 30 September 2019

Mohammad Aslam Khan Bareach (born 26 January 1976) is a Pakistani cricket umpire. He has stood as an umpire in 24 first-class, 13 List A one-day and eight Twenty20 matches between 2014–2019.
