= Israrullah =

Pakistani cricketer (born 1990)

Personal information
- Born: 15 January 1990 (age 36); Monzai, Khyber Pakhtunkhwa, Pakistan
- Batting: Left-handed
- Bowling: Slow left-arm Orthodox

Domestic team information
- Years: Team
- 2009–2018, 2023–present: Peshawar
- 2019–2022: Khyber Pakhtunkhwa
- Source: Cricinfo, 1 November 2015

Israrullah (born 15 January 1990) is a Pakistani cricketer who plays for Peshawar. He was the leading run-scorer for Peshawar in the 2017–18 Quaid-e-Azam Trophy, with 373 runs in six matches.

== Biography ==
Israrullah was born in Monzai, Khyber Pakhtunkhwa.

In April 2018, he was named in Khyber Pakhtunkhwa's squad for the 2018 Pakistan Cup. He was also the leading run-scorer for Peshawar in the 2018–19 Quaid-e-Azam Trophy, with 624 runs in ten matches. In March 2019, he was named in Federal Areas' squad for the 2019 Pakistan Cup.

In January 2021, he was named in Khyber Pakhtunkhwa's squad for the 2020–21 Pakistan Cup.
