= Tahir Shah (cricketer) =

Pakistani cricketer and umpire (1959–2025)

Personal information
- Born: 27 January 1959; Lahore, West Pakistan, Pakistan
- Died: 3 February 2025 (aged 66)
- Source: Cricinfo, 1 November 2015

Tahir Shah (Urdu: طاہر شاہ; 27 January 1959 – 3 February 2025) was a Pakistani first-class cricketer. He was also an umpire and stood in matches in the 2015–16 Quaid-e-Azam Trophy.

== Early life and education ==
Tahir Shah was born on 27 January 1959 in Lahore. He earned a B.A. from Islamia College, Lahore.

Shah completed his master's in Economics from Islamia College (Civil Lines) in 1976 while developing his skills as a wicket-keeper batsman.

== Career ==
Shah initially joined Universal Cricket Club and later moved to Dharampura Cricket Club. Shah captained his college team and was selected for the Punjab University team in the 1974–75 season.

In 1975–76, Shah debuted for Lahore B in the Patron's Trophy, scoring 64 and 69 against Hyderabad. His first-class career, consisting of four matches, ended in the 1978–79 season with his appearance for WAPDA.

Shah was a founding member and President of Shaheen Cricket Club since 1978. He served as a selector for Islamia College's intermediate and degree teams and was a selector for Pakistan Universities for one season.

Shah worked with Service Industries Limited, managing their cricket team and leading them to Grade I first-class cricket twice. He was involved in a dispute within the Lahore City Cricket Association (LCCA) which led to a High Court case and Shah's eventual departure from Servis Industries without financial compensation.

== Later life and death ==
Shah later worked as a journalist and commentator, contributing to various publications and Radio Pakistan.

Shah died from a cardiac arrest on 3 February 2025, at the age of 66.
