= Shahzaib Ahmed =

Pakistani cricketer (born 1991)

Personal information
- Full name: Shahzaib Ahmed Khan
- Born: 8 September 1991 (age 35); Karachi, Pakistan
- Source: Cricinfo, 12 November 2015

Shahzaib Ahmed (born 8 September 1991) is a Pakistani first-class cricketer who plays for Peshawar cricket team. In September 2019, he was named in Balochistan's squad for the 2019–20 Quaid-e-Azam Trophy tournament.
