= Shahid Yousuf =

Pakistani cricketer (born 1986)

Personal information
- Born: 15 June 1986 (age 40); Sialkot, Punjab, Pakistan
- Batting: Right-handed
- Bowling: Right-arm fast-medium
- Role: Batsman, occasional wicketkeeper

Domestic team information
- Years: Team
- 2014–2015: Islamabad Leopards
- Sialkot Stallions
- 2016: Peshawar Zalmi (squad no. 11)
- Water and Power Development Authority
- Zarai Taraqiati Bank
- Islamabad Cricket team
- National Bank of Pakistan Cricket team
- 2007–2008: Lahore Badshahs
- 2009: ICL Pakistan XI
- Lahore Cricket Team

Career statistics
| Competition | FC | LA | T20 |
|---|---|---|---|
| Matches | 71 | 77 | 20 |
| Runs scored | 3,430 | 2,480 | 320 |
| Batting average | 33.30 | 35.42 | 18.82 |
| 100s/50s | 4/17 | 2/20 | 0/1 |
| Top score | 125* | 113 | 68 |
| Balls bowled | 694 | 361 | – |
| Wickets | 8 | 6 | – |
| Bowling average | 41.37 | 49.66 | – |
| 5 wickets in innings | 0 | 0 | – |
| 10 wickets in match | 0 | 0 | – |
| Best bowling | 2/22 | 2/12 | – |
| Catches/stumpings | 77/– | 31/– | 6/– |
- Source: ESPNcricinfo, 7 December 2009

Shahid Yousuf (born 15 June 1986) is a Pakistani cricketer for Lahore. A right-hand bat, Yousuf made his debut in 2002. In 2003, he was named vice-captain for the Pakistan U-19 team which toured Sri Lanka.

In April 2018, he was named in Punjab's squad for the 2018 Pakistan Cup.
