= Asad Ali (cricketer) =

Pakistani cricketer (born 1988)

Personal information
- Born: 14 October 1988 (age 38); Faisalabad, Punjab, Pakistan
- Batting: Right-handed
- Bowling: Right-arm fast-medium
- Role: Bowler

International information
- National side: Pakistan (2013)
- ODI debut (cap 191): 26 May 2013 v Ireland
- Last ODI: 24 July 2013 v West Indies
- ODI shirt no.: 72
- T20I debut (cap 53): 28 July 2013 v West Indies
- Last T20I: 24 August 2013 v Zimbabwe

Career statistics
Competition	ODI	T20I	First-class	List A
Matches	4	2	119	76
Runs scored	13	–	863	143
Batting average	6.50	–	8.89	6.50
100s/50s	0/0	–/–	0/1	0/0
Top score	11	–	53	22
Balls bowled	180	24	22,046	3,663
Wickets	2	0	513	126
Bowling average	57.50	–	22.89	23.15
5 wickets in innings	0	0	31	0
10 wickets in match	0	0	6	0
Best bowling	1/22	–	7/42	4/14
Catches/stumpings	0/–	0/–	27/–	14/–
- Source: Cricinfo, 29 April 2026

Asad Ali (born 14 October 1988) is a Pakistani former cricketer. A right-handed batsman and right-arm fast-medium bowler, he played four One Day Internationals and two Twenty20 Internationals for Pakistan in 2013.

Ali made his first-class debut for Faisalabad against Sialkot in October 2005. He later represented Faisalabad, Faisalabad Wolves, Punjab Stallions, Punjab, Sui Northern Gas Pipelines Limited and Baluchistan in domestic cricket. In the 2012–13 President's Cup One-Day Tournament, he helped Sui Northern Gas Pipelines Limited win the title, taking 4 for 37 in the final against Water and Power Development Authority. He finished the tournament as its leading wicket-taker.

In 2013, he was included in Pakistan's squad for the 2013 ICC Champions Trophy after his domestic performances. He made his ODI debut against Ireland at Dublin on 26 May 2013, and made his T20I debut against the West Indies at Kingstown on 28 July 2013.
