= Faizan Riaz =

Pakistani cricketer (born 1988)

Personal information
- Born: 2 July 1988 (age 38); Islamabad, Pakistan
- Batting: Right-handed
- Bowling: Legbreak
- Source: Cricinfo, 14 November 2015

Faizan Riaz (born 2 July 1988) is a Pakistani cricketer who plays for Northern. In April 2018, he was named in Baluchistan's squad for the 2018 Pakistan Cup. He was the leading run-scorer for Islamabad in the 2018–19 Quaid-e-Azam One Day Cup, with 439 runs in eight matches.

In March 2019, he was named in Khyber Pakhtunkhwa's squad for the 2019 Pakistan Cup. In January 2021, he was named in Northern's squad for the 2020–21 Pakistan Cup.
