= Mohammad Irfan (cricketer, born 1995) =

Pakistani cricketer (born 1995)

Personal information
- Born: 15 May 1995 (age 31); Nankana Sahib, Punjab, Pakistan
- Height: 6 ft 6 in (198 cm)
- Batting: Right-handed
- Bowling: Right-arm Fast
- Role: Bowler

Domestic team information
- Years: Team
- 2014–: Water and Power Development Authority
- 2017: Lahore Qalandars
- 2018: Karachi Kings
- 2019: Quetta Gladiators
- Source: Cricinfo, 13 February 2019

Mohammad Irfan (born 15 May 1995) is a former Pakistani first-class cricketer who played for Water and Power Development Authority and had represented Lahore Qalandars, Karachi Kings and Quetta Gladiators in the PSL.

In April 2018, he was named in Khyber Pakhtunkhwa's squad for the 2018 Pakistan Cup.

As of 2020, he was living in Sydney, Australia where he played for Western Suburbs as he awaited Australian citizenship.
