= Islamabad cricket team =

Cricket team

The Islamabad cricket team is a first-class cricket team based in Islamabad, Pakistan. Its home ground is the Diamond Club Ground in Sector F-8, Islamabad. Beginning with the 2024–25 season, it participates in Pakistan's first-class, List A and Twenty20 competitions. For Twenty20 and List A till 2015-16 season, cricket the team also participated as the Islamabad Leopards in the National T20 Cup and National One-day Championship.

Islamabad was scheduled to play its first two first-class matches in the 1986–87 season in the BCCP President's Cup, but it conceded the matches without playing. It eventually made its first-class debut in 1992–93 in the Quaid-i-Azam Trophy, in which it has competed ever since, except for the 2002–03, 2003–04 and 2004–05 seasons.

As of mid-November 2013, Islamabad had played 163 matches, for 39 wins, 54 losses and 70 draws.
