= List of Karachi first-class cricket teams =

Cricket teams

Karachi cricket teams have competed in the Pakistani first-class cricket tournaments the Patron's Trophy and Quaid-e-Azam Trophy from 1953–54 to 2018–19, and from 2023 to 2024. Between 2019–20 and 2022–23, the city of Karachi was represented in the Quaid-e-Azam Trophy by the Sindh cricket team.

== Teams ==
Owing to the strength of cricket in Karachi, from the 1956–57 season the Karachi City Cricket Association has usually fielded two, sometimes three, first-class teams. (Lahore has done the same from the 1957–58 season due to similar reasons.) The names of the teams have varied. In the 1956–57 Quaid-e-Azam Trophy the teams were Karachi Whites (who lost the final), Karachi Blues (defeated by Karachi Whites in a semi-final) and Karachi Greens. In 2014–15 the two latest team names made their debuts: Karachi Dolphins (in the Quaid-e-Azam Trophy Gold League) and Karachi Zebras (in the Silver League).

In 2019, domestic cricket in Pakistan was significantly restructured, with six provincial first-class teams replacing the traditional mix of regional associations and departments, and Karachi being represented by Sindh. In 2023, this structure was abandoned, with Karachi Whites returning to first-class competition, competing in the 2023–24 Quaid-e-Azam Trophy.

In order of appearance, the teams have been:

Karachi
1953–54 to 2003–04, 123 matches in 26 seasons; 43 wins, 39 losses, 41 draws.
The highest score was 499 by Hanif Mohammad in 1958–59, which remained the world first-class record score until 1994, and the best bowling figures were 8 for 83 by Tanvir Ali in 1984–85. Karachi's record includes six matches against international touring teams.

Karachi Greens
1956–57 to 1983–84, 16 matches in seven seasons; seven wins, four losses, five draws.
The highest score was 111 not out by Kamal Najamuddin in 1983–84, and the best bowling figures were 8 for 75 by Aslam Qureshi in 1971–72.

Karachi Whites
1956–57 to 2013–14, 271 matches in 40 seasons; 119 wins, 58 losses, 94 draws.
The highest score was 324 by Waheed Mirza in 1976–77, and the best bowling figures were 10 for 58 by Shahid Mahmood in 1969–70.

Karachi Blues
1956–57 to 2013–14, 279 matches in 40 seasons; 114 wins, 75 losses, 90 draws.
The highest score was 303 not out by Mushtaq Mohammad in 1967–68, and the best bowling figures were 8 for 39 by Rashid Khan in 1983–84.

Karachi A
1957–58 to 1979–80, 13 matches in five seasons; seven wins, two losses, four draws.
The highest score was 146 not out by Hanif Mohammad in 1957–58, when Karachi A won by an innings without losing a wicket, and the best bowling figures were 6 for 23 by Mohammad Munaf in 1957–58.

Karachi B
1957–58 to 1978–79, 14 matches in four seasons; seven wins, two losses, five draws.
The highest score was 158 by Naushad Ali in 1962–63, and the best bowling figures were 8 for 39 by Mohiuddin Khan in 1978–79.

Karachi C
1957–58, five matches; three wins, one loss, one draw.
The highest score was 137 by Salimuddin in 1957–58, and the best bowling figures were 6 for 14 by Mahboob Shah in the same match.

Karachi Urban
2005–06 to 2007–08, 14 matches in three seasons; six wins, four losses, four draws.
The highest score was 200 by Khurram Manzoor in the one-off match against Mumbai in 2007–08 (Karachi Urban's last match) and the best bowling figures were 6 for 93 by Nasir Khan in 2005–06.

Karachi Harbour
2005–06 to 2006–07, 16 matches in two seasons; six wins, eight losses, two draws.
The highest score was 200 not out by Moin Khan in 2005–06, and the best bowling figures were 6 for 54 by Anwar Ali in 2006–07.

Karachi Dolphins
2014–15, 11 matches in one season; four wins, four losses, three draws.
The highest score is 207 by Fazal Subhan in 2014–15, and the best bowling figures are 8 for 122 by Shahzaib Ahmed in 2014–15.

Karachi Zebras
2014–15, six matches in one season; two wins, three losses, one draw.
The highest score is 114 by two batsmen in 2014–15, and the best bowling figures are 7 for 16 by Mansoor Ahmed in 2014–15.

Note: The Karachi Port Trust team is listed separately, as it was sponsored by a corporation, not by the Karachi City Cricket Association.

== Honours ==
=== Quaid-i-Azam Trophy ===
Karachi teams have won the Quaid-e-Azam Trophy a record 19 times.

- 1954–55 (Karachi)
- 1958–59 (Karachi)
- 1959–60 (Karachi)
- 1961–62 (Karachi Blues)
- 1962–63 (Karachi A)
- 1963–64 (Karachi Blues)
- 1964–65 (Karachi Blues)
- 1966–67 (Karachi)
- 1967–68 (Karachi)
- 1970–71 (Karachi Blues)
- 1985–86 (Karachi)
- 1990–91 (Karachi Whites)
- 1991–92 (Karachi Whites)
- 1992–93 (Karachi Whites)
- 1994–95 (Karachi Blues)
- 1995–96 (Karachi Blues)
- 1997–98 (Karachi Blues)
- 2001–02 (Karachi Whites)
- 2006–07 (Karachi Urban)
- 2009–10 (Karachi Blues)
- 2012–13 (Karachi Blues)
- 2023–24 (Karachi Whites)
- 2025–26 (Karachi Blues)

=== Patron's Trophy ===
Karachi teams have won the Patron's Trophy 11 times.

- 1961–60 (Karachi)
- 1962–63 (Karachi)
- 1964–65 (Karachi)
- 1965–66 (Karachi Blues)
- 1967–68 (Karachi Blues)
- 1972–73 (Karachi Blues)
- 1983–84 (Karachi Blues)
- 1984–85 (Karachi Whites)
- 1985–86 (Karachi Whites)
- 1988–89 (Karachi)
- 1989–90 (Karachi Whites)

=== National T20 Cup ===
Karachi teams have won the National T20 Cup once, and finished as runner-up on 6 occasions (Karachi Dolphins).

- 2023–24 (Karachi Whites)

== See also ==
- Karachi women's cricket team
