= National Bank of Pakistan cricket team =

Cricket team

National Bank of Pakistan
- NBP Cricket Team

Personnel
- Owner: National Bank of Pakistan

Team information
- Colours
- Founded: 1947; 79 years ago
- Home ground: NBP Sports Complex
- Capacity: 1,000

History
- Quaid-e-Azam Trophy wins: 5
- President's Trophy wins: 6
- Pentangular Trophy wins: 3
- Official website: www.nbp.com.pk

National Bank of Pakistan cricket team, sponsored by the National Bank of Pakistan, was a first-class cricket side, one of the most successful in Pakistani domestic cricket. They won each of the three major trophies at least once and achieved 14 tournament wins in total.

They played 421 matches of first-class cricket between the 1969–70 season and the 2018–19 season. They won 179 matches, lost 76 and drew 166. Many stars of Pakistani cricket have played for the team, including Inzamam-ul-Haq, Mushtaq Ahmed and Waqar Younis.

In May 2019, Pakistan's Prime Minister Imran Khan revamped the domestic cricket structure in Pakistan, excluding departmental teams like National Bank of Pakistan in favour of regional sides, therefore ending the participation of the team. The Pakistan Cricket Board (PCB) was criticised in removing departmental sides, with players voicing their concern to revive the teams.

== Honours ==
- Quaid-e-Azam Trophy (5)
- 1975–76
- 1978–79
- 1981–82
- 1983–84
- 1986–87
- Patron's Trophy (6)
- 1974–75
- 1975–76
- 1978–79
- 1986–87
- 2001–02
- 2005–06
- Pentangular Trophy (3)
- 1974–75
- 1994–95
- 2005-06
