= List of Pakistan Test cricket records =

Test cricket is the oldest form of cricket played at international level. A Test match is scheduled to take place over a period of five days, and is played by teams representing Full Member nations of the International Cricket Council (ICC). (Note: For the first 50 years of Test cricket matches were played over three or four days and until the 1930s some timeless Tests were played.) Pakistan obtained Full Member status of the ICC in 1952, becoming the seventh nation eligible to play Test cricket. The Pakistan national cricket team played their first Test match on 16 October 1952 against India which they lost by an innings and 70 runs. They recorded their first victory in their second ever match against India on 23 October 1952. Since then, they have played 470 matches, against every other Test-playing nation. As of August 2026, Pakistan is the fourth-most successful team in Test cricket with an overall winning percentage of 32.34

Top order batsman and former captain Younis Khan holds several Pakistan batting records. He has scored the most runs (10,099) for Pakistan in Test cricket – the first and only player to score over 10,000 runs in the format for his country. He is the record holder for the highest number of centuries (34) as well as the highest number of double centuries (six with Javed Miandad) for Pakistan. Hanif Mohammad's 337 runs against the West Indies in 1958 is the highest individual score by a Pakistani cricketer, surpassing the previous best of 209 by Imtiaz Ahmed, which was established in 1955. It is also the eighth-highest individual score in Test cricket. Hanif Mohammad (337), Inzamam-ul-Haq (329), Younis Khan (313) and Azhar Ali (302 not out) are the only Pakistani players who have scored triple centuries.

Wasim Akram, regarded as "one of the greatest left-arm bowlers in the history of world cricket", holds several Test records. He holds the record for the most Test wickets (414) as well as the record for the most five wickets per innings (25) for Pakistan. Akram also holds the record of highest individual score batting at number 8 (257 not out) in Test cricket. This feat was achieved in 1996 playing against Zimbabwe. Abdul Qadir's nine wickets for 56 runs, against England at Gaddafi Stadium in 1987, is the best bowling figures in an innings by a Pakistani bowler. 14 wickets for 116 runs by Imran Khan against Sri Lanka in 1982 at the same ground is the best bowling performance in a Test by a Pakistani player. He also holds the record for best bowling average for Pakistan with 22.81. Younis Khan took 139 catches from 118 matches as fielder, the most by a Pakistani and twelfth-highest overall. Wasim Bari is Pakistan's most successful wicket-keeper having taken 228 dismissals; he is eleventh in the list of most dismissals in Test cricket.

== Key ==
The top five records are listed for each category, except in "team wins, losses, and draws" and "highest wicket partnerships". Tied records for the fifth place are listed as well. Explanations of the general symbols and cricketing terms used in the list are given below. Specific details are provided in each category where appropriate.

Symbol	Meaning
†	Player is currently active in Test cricket
*	Player remained not out or partnership remained unbroken
♠	World record
d	Innings was declared (e.g. 952/6d)
Date	Starting date of the Test match
Innings	Number of innings played
Matches	Number of matches played
Opponent	The team Pakistan was playing against
Period	The time period when the player was active in Test cricket
Player	The player involved in the record
Venue	Test cricket ground where the match was played

== Team records ==
=== Team wins, losses, and draws ===
Pakistan has played 474 Test matches resulting in 153 victories, 155 defeats and 166 draws for an overall winning percentage of 32.28 . A tie can occur when the scores of both teams are equal at the conclusion of play, provided that the side batting last has completed their innings. Only two matches have ended in a tie in Test cricket history, neither of which involved Pakistan.

Statistics are correct as of Pakistani cricket team in England in 2026

Pakistan's Test cricket record by opponent
Opponent	Matches	Won	Lost	Tied	Draw	W/L Ratio	% Won	% Lost	% Drew	First	Last
Australia	72	15	37	0	20	0.41	20.83	45.83	27.77	1956	2024
Bangladesh	17	12	4	0	1	3.00	70.59	23.53	5.88	2001	2026
England	95	23	33	0	39	0.69	24.21	34.74	41.05	1954	2026
India	59	12	9	0	38	1.33	20.33	15.25	64.40	1952	2007
Ireland	1	1	0	0	0	-	100.00	00.00	00.00	2018	2018
New Zealand	62	25	14	0	23	1.78	40.32	22.58	37.09	1955	2023
South Africa	32	7	18	0	7	0.39	21.88	56.25	21.86	1995	2025
Sri Lanka	59	23	17	0	19	1.35	38.98	28.81	32.20	1982	2023
West Indies	58	23	20	0	15	1.15	39.66	34.48	25.86	1958	2026
Zimbabwe	19	12	3	0	4	4.00	63.15	15.78	21.05	1993	2021
Total	474	153	155	0	166	0.99	32.28	32.70	35.02	1952	2026
Statistics are correct as of Pakistan v England, 3rd Test, 9–12 September 2026.

=== First Test series wins ===
Opponent	Year of first Home win	Year of first Away win
Australia	1956	–
Bangladesh	2001	2002
England	1984	1987
India	1978	1987
Ireland	YTP	2018
New Zealand	1955	1973
South Africa	2003	–
Sri Lanka	1982	1994
West Indies	1959	2017
Zimbabwe	1993	1995
Last updated: 20 June 2020

=== First Test match wins ===
Opponent	Home		Away	
Opponent	Venue	Year	Venue	Year
Australia	Karachi	1956	Sydney	1977
Bangladesh	Multan	2001	Dhaka	2002
England	Karachi	1984	The Oval	1954
India	Lahore	1978	Lucknow	1952
Ireland	YTP	YTP	Malahide	2018
New Zealand	Karachi	1955	Dunedin	1973
South Africa	Lahore	2003	Durban	1998
Sri Lanka	Karachi	1982	Kandy	1986
West Indies	Karachi	1959	Port of Spain	1958
Zimbabwe	Karachi	1993	Bulawayo	1995
Last updated: 20 June 2020

=== Home Test series won ===
Opponent	Frequency	Series won
Australia	7	1956–57 (1-0), 1979–80 (1-0), 1982–83 (3-0), 1988–89 (1-0), 1994–95 (1-0), 2014–15 (2-0), 2018–19 (1-0)
Bangladesh	2	2003 (3-0), 2019–20 (1-0)
England	6	1983–84 (1-0), 1987–88 (1-0), 2005–06 (2-0), 2011–12 (3-0), 2015–16 (2-0), 2024–25 (2-1)
India	3	1978–79 (2-0), 1982–83 (3-0), 2005–06 (1-0)
Ireland	N/A	Yet to Play
New Zealand	6	1955–56 (2-0), 1964–65 (2-0), 1976–77 (2-0), 1984–85 (2-0), 1990–91 (3-0), 2002 (1-0)
South Africa	2	2003–04 (1-0), 2020–21 (2-0)
Sri Lanka	5	1981–82 (2-0), 1985–86 (2-0), 1991–92 (1-0), 2011–12 (1-0), 2019–20 (1-0)
West Indies	5	1958–59 (2-1), 1997–98 (3-0), 2001–02 (2-0), 2006–07 (2-0), 2016–17 (2-1)
Zimbabwe	2	1993–94 (2-0), 1996–97 (1-0)
Last updated: 29 July 2023

=== Away Test series won ===
Opponent	Frequency	Series won
Australia	0	Yet to win
Bangladesh	4	2001–02 (2-0), 2011–12 (2-0), 2014–15 (1-0), 2021–22 (2-0)
England	3	1987 (1-0), 1992 (2-1), 1996 (2-0)
India	1	1986-87 (1-0)
Ireland	1	2018 (1-0)
New Zealand	7	1972–73 (1-0), 1978–79 (1-0), 1992–93 (1-0), 1993–94 (2-1), 1995–96 (1-0), 2003–04 (1-0), 2010–11 (1-0)
South Africa	0	Yet to win
Sri Lanka	5	1994 (2-0), 2000 (2-0), 2005–06 (1-0), 2015 (2-1), 2023 (2-0)
West Indies	1	2016–17 (2-1)
Zimbabwe	5	1994–95 (2-1), 1997–98 (1-0), 2002–03 (2-0), 2011 (1-0), 2020–21 (2-0)
Last updated: 29 July 2023

=== Total Test series won ===
Opponent	Frequency
Australia	7
Bangladesh	6
England	9
India	4
Ireland	1
New Zealand	13
South Africa	2
Sri Lanka	10
West Indies	6
Zimbabwe	7
Last updated: 1 November 2024

=== Team scoring records ===
==== Most runs in an innings ====
The highest innings total scored in Test cricket came in the series between Sri Lanka and India in August 1997. Playing in the first Test at the R. Premadasa Stadium in Colombo, the hosts posted a first innings total of 952/6d. This broke the longstanding record of 903/7d which England set against Australia in the final Test of the 1938 Ashes series at The Oval. The first Test of the 2008–09 series against Sri Lanka saw Pakistan set their highest innings total of 765/5d, the fifth-highest score in Test cricket.

Rank	Score	Opposition	Venue	Date
1	765–6d	Sri Lanka	National Stadium, Karachi	21 February 2009
2	708	England	Kennington Oval, London	6 August 1987
3	699–5	India	Gaddafi Stadium, Lahore	1 December 1989
4	679–7d	India	Gaddafi Stadium, Lahore	13 January 2006
5	674–6	India	Iqbal Stadium, Faisalabad	24 October 1984
Last updated: 30 August 2017

==== Highest successful run chases ====
Pakistan's highest fourth innings total is 450 all out in an unsuccessful run chase against Australia at Brisbane in December 2016. Australia had set a target of 490. Pakistan's second highest fourth innings total of 443/7 also came against Australia at Karachi in 2022.

Rank	Score	Target	Opposition	Venue	Date
1	382/3	377	Sri Lanka	Pallekele International Cricket Stadium, Pallekele, Sri Lanka	3 July 2015
2	344/6	344	Sri Lanka	Galle International Stadium, Galle, Sri Lanka	16 July 2022
3	315/9	314	Australia	National Stadium, Karachi, Pakistan	28 September 1994
4	302/5	302	Sri Lanka	Sharjah Cricket Stadium, Sharjah, UAE	16 January 2014
5	277/3	274	New Zealand	Basin Reserve, Wellington, New Zealand	26 December 2003
Last updated: 20 June 2020

==== Lowest runs in an innings ====
Rank	Score	Opposition	Venue	Date
1	49	South Africa	New Wanderers Stadium, Johannesburg, South Africa	1 February 2013
2	53	Australia	Sharjah Cricket Stadium, Sharjah, UAE	11 October 2002
3	59	Australia	Sharjah Cricket Stadium, Sharjah, UAE	11 October 2002
4	62	Australia	WACA Ground, Perth, Australia	13 November 1981
5	72	England	Edgbaston Cricket Ground, Birmingham, England	6 August 2010
5	72	Australia	WACA Ground, Perth, Australia	16 December 2004
Last updated: 20 June 2020

==== Most runs conceded in an innings ====
The highest innings total scored against Pakistan is by England when they scored 823/7d in the first Test of the England tour of Pakistan in 2024 at Multan.

Rank	Score	Opposition	Venue	Date
1	823/7d	England	Multan Cricket Stadium, Multan, Pakistan	7 October 2024
2	790/3d	West Indies	Sabina Park, Kingston, Jamaica	26 February 1958
3	690	New Zealand	Sharjah Cricket Stadium, Sharjah, UAE	26 November 2014
4	675/5d	India	Multan Cricket Stadium, Multan, Pakistan	28 March 2004
5	659/6d	New Zealand	Hagley Oval, Christchurch, New Zealand	3 January 2021
Last updated: 6 January 2021

==== Lowest runs conceded in an innings ====
The lowest innings total scored against Pakistan is 53 in the first test of West Indies tour of Pakistan in 1986

Rank	Score	Opposition	Venue	Date
1	53	West Indies	Iqbal Stadium, Faisalabad, Pakistan	24 October 1986
2	70	New Zealand	Bangabandhu National Stadium, Dhaka, Bangladesh	7 November 1955
3	71	Sri Lanka	Asgiriya Stadium, Kandy, Sri Lanka	26 August 1994
4	72	England	Sheikh Zayed Cricket Stadium, Abu Dhabi, UAE	25 January 2012
5	73	New Zealand	Gaddafi Stadium, Lahore, Pakistan	1 May 2002
5	73	Sri Lanka	Asgiriya Stadium, Kandy, Sri Lanka	3 April 2006
Last updated: 3 December 2017

=== Result records ===
A Test match is won when one side has scored more runs than the total runs scored by the opposing side during their two innings. If both sides have completed both their allocated innings and the side that fielded last has the higher aggregate of runs, it is known as a win by runs. This indicates the number of runs that they had scored more than the opposing side. If one side scores more runs in a single innings than the total runs scored by the other side in both their innings, it is known as a win by innings and runs. If the side batting last wins the match, it is known as a win by wickets, indicating the number of wickets that were still to fall.

==== Greatest win margins (by innings) ====
The fifth Test of the 1938 Ashes series at The Oval saw England win by an innings and 579 runs, the largest victory by an innings in Test cricket history. The fifth-largest victory was Pakistan's win against New Zealand in the first Test of the 2002 tour at the Gaddafi Stadium, where the hosts won by an innings and 324 runs.

Rank	Margin	Opposition	Venue	Date
1	Innings and 324 runs	New Zealand	Gaddafi Stadium, Lahore	1 May 2002
2	Innings and 264 runs	Bangladesh	Multan Cricket Stadium, Multan	29 August 2001
3	Innings and 222 runs	Sri Lanka	Singhalese Sports Club Cricket Ground, Colombo	16 July 2023
4	Innings and 188 runs	Australia	National Stadium, Karachi	15 September 1988
5	Innings and 184 runs	Bangladesh	Zahur Ahmed Chowdhury Stadium, Chittagong	9 December 2011
Last updated: 30 August 2017

==== Greatest win margins (by runs) ====
The greatest winning margin by runs in Test cricket was England's victory over Australia by 675 runs in the first Test of the 1928–29 Ashes series. Pakistan's largest victory by runs was recorded in the second Test of the 2018–19 series where they defeated Australia by 373 runs.

Rank	Margin	Opposition	Venue	Date
1	373 runs	Australia	Zayed Sports City Stadium, Abu Dhabi	19 October 2018
2	356 runs	Australia	Zayed Sports City Stadium, Abu Dhabi	30 October 2014
3	341 runs	India	National Stadium, Karachi	29 January 2006
4	328 runs	Bangladesh	Sher-e-Bangla National Cricket Stadium, Dhaka	6 May 2015
5	301 runs	Sri Lanka	Paikiasothy Saravanamuttu Stadium, Colombo	9 August 1994
Last updated: 19 October 2018

==== Greatest win margins (by 10 wickets) ====
Pakistan have won a Test match by a margin of 10 wickets on 13 occasions, rank fourth in the list after Australia (28), West Indies (25) and England (20). (Note: The other teams to have won a Test match by a margin of 10 wickets are South Africa (8), Sri Lanka (8), India (7) and New Zealand (4).)

Rank	Victories	Opposition	Most recent venue	Date
1	4	England	The Oval, London, England	11 August 2016
2	2	West Indies	National Stadium, Karachi	6 December 1997
2	2	Zimbabwe	Queens Sports Club, Bulawayo, Zimbabwe	16 November 2002
2	2	New Zealand	Seddon Park, Hamilton	7 January 2011
2	2	Sri Lanka	Galle International Stadium, Galle	17 June 2015
6	1	India	Iqbal Stadium, Faisalabad	3 January 1983
Last updated: 30 August 2017

==== Narrowest win margins (by runs) ====
Pakistan's narrowest win by runs was against India in the first Test of the 1998–99 series at M.Chinnaswamy Stadium, Chennai. Set 271 runs for victory in the final innings, India were bowled all out for 258 to give victory to Pakistan by twelve runs. This was the twelfth-narrowest win in the history of Test cricket. (Note: England have won a Test match by 12 runs on two occasions against Australia.)

Rank	Margin	Opposition	Venue	Date
1	12 runs	India	MA Chidambaram Stadium, Chennai	28 January 1999
2	16 runs	India	M.Chinnaswamy Stadium, Bangalore	13 March 1987
3	22 runs	England	Multan Cricket Stadium, Multan	12 November 2005
4	24 runs	England	Kennington Oval, London	12 August 1954
5	29 runs	South Africa	Kingsmead Cricket Ground, Durban	26 February 1998
Last updated: 30 August 2017

==== Narrowest win margins (by wickets) ====
Out of twelve occasions, Pakistan have achieved their narrowest win of one-wicket victory twice. Their first-narrowest win by wickets came in the first Test of the Australia tour of Pakistan in 1994–95. Played at the National Stadium in Karachi, the hosts won the match by a margin of one wicket. Pakistan repeated the feat against Bangladesh at Multan Cricket Stadium in 2003.

Rank	Margin	Opposition	Venue	Date
1	1 wicket	Australia	National Stadium, Karachi	28 September 1994
1	1 wicket	Bangladesh	Multan Cricket Stadium, Multan	3 September 2003
3	2 wicket	England	Lord's, London	18 June 1992
4	3 wickets	England	National Stadium, Karachi	2 March 1984
4	3 wickets	Sri Lanka	Iqbal Stadium, Faisalabad	2 January 1992
4	3 wickets	Zimbabwe	Harare Sports Club, Harare	21 March 1998
4	3 wickets	Australia	Headingley Cricket Ground, Leeds	21 July 2010
Last updated: 30 August 2017

==== Greatest loss margins (by innings) ====
Lord's in London played host Pakistan's greatest defeat by an innings in Test cricket. The final Test of the 2010 series saw England defeat the tourists by an innings and 225 runs, to win the series 2–0.

Rank	Margin	Opposition	Venue	Date
1	Innings and 225 runs	England	Lord's, London	26 August 2010
2	Innings and 198 runs	Australia	Sharjah Cricket Stadium, Sharjah	11 October 2002
3	Innings and 185 runs	New Zealand	Seddon Park, Hamilton	27 March 2001
4	Innings and 176 runs	New Zealand	Hagley Oval, Christchurch	3 January 2021
5	Innings and 174 runs	West Indies	Sabina Park, Kingston	26 February 1958
Last updated: 6 January 2021

==== Greatest loss margins (by runs) ====
The first Test of the 2004–05 series saw Pakistan defeated by Australia by 491 runs, fourth greatest losing margin by runs in Test cricket.

Rank	Margin	Opposition	Venue	Date
1	491 runs	Australia	WACA Ground, Perth	16 December 2004
2	360 runs	Australia	Perth Stadium, Perth	17 December 2023
3	354 runs	England	Trent Bridge, Nottingham	29 July 2010
4	348 runs	Australia	Melbourne Cricket Ground, Melbourne	1 January 1977
5	330 runs	England	Old Trafford Cricket Ground, Manchester	22 July 2016
Last updated: 17 December 2023

==== Greatest loss margins (by 10 wickets) ====
Pakistan have lost a Test match by a margin of 10 wickets on nine occasions. (Note: The other teams to have lost a Test match by a margin of 10 wickets are Bangladesh (4), Sri Lanka (5), Zimbabwe (7), Australia (10), South Africa (12), New Zealand (13), the West Indies (15), India (17) and England (21).)

Rank	Number of Defeats	Opposition	Most Recent Venue	Date
1	3	Australia	The Gabba, Brisbane	5 November 1999
2	2	England	Trent Bridge, Nottingham	10 August 1967
2	2	India	MA Chidambaram Stadium, Chennai	15 January 1980
4	1	West Indies	Kensington Oval, Bridgetown	23 April 1993
4	1	South Africa	Kingsmead Cricket Ground, Durban	26 December 2002
Last updated: 30 August 2017

==== Narrowest loss margins (by runs) ====
Rank	Margin	Opposition	Venue	Date
1	4 runs	New Zealand	Sheikh Zayed Cricket Stadium, Abu Dhabi	16 November 2018
2	21 runs	Sri Lanka	Sheikh Zayed Cricket Stadium, Abu Dhabi	2 October 2017
3	24 runs	Zimbabwe	Harare Sports Club, Harare	14 September 2013
4	25 runs	England	Headingley Cricket Stadium, Leeds	8 July 1971
5	32 runs	New Zealand	University Oval, Dunedin	24 January 2009
Last updated: 18 April 2021

==== Narrowest loss margins (by wickets) ====
Test cricket has seen fifteen matches been decided by a margin of one wicket, with Pakistan being defeated twice, both coming against West Indies. The first was the final Test of the 1999–2000 series at Antigua Recreation Ground where the West Indies ran down the target of 216 runs in the final inning and the second happened in the opening test of the 2021 series at Sabina Park where the last wicket pair scored the last 17 runs to chase down 168.

Rank	Margin	Opposition	Venue	Date
1	1 wicket	West Indies	Antigua Recreation Ground, St. John's	25 May 2000
1	1 wicket	West Indies	Sabina Park, Kingston, Jamaica	12 August 2021
3	2 wickets	New Zealand	University Oval, Dunedin	9 February 1985
3	2 wickets	West Indies	Kensington Oval, Bridgetown	22 April 1988
3	2 wickets	Sri Lanka	Rawalpindi Cricket Stadium, Rawalpindi	26 February 2000
3	2 wickets	South Africa	Centurion Park, Centurion	26 December 2024
Last updated: 29 December 2024

== Batting records ==
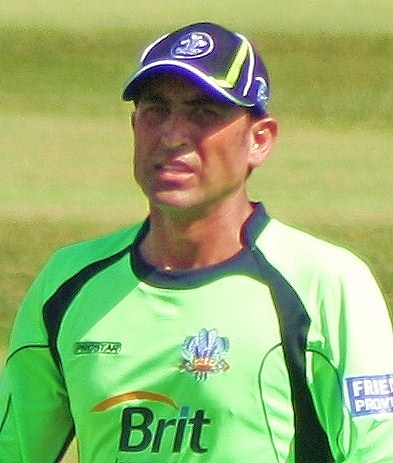
Younis Khan is the highest run scorer (10,099) and century-maker (34) for Pakistan in Tests.

=== Most career runs ===
A run is the basic means of scoring in cricket. A run is scored when the batsman hits the ball with his bat and with his partner runs the length of 22 yards (20 m) of the pitch.

India's Sachin Tendulkar has scored the most runs in Test cricket with 15,921. Second is Ricky Ponting of Australia with 13,378 ahead of Jacques Kallis from South Africa in third with 13,289. Younis Khan is the only Pakistani batsman who has scored more than 10,000 runs in Test cricket.

Rank	Runs	Player	Matches	Innings	Period
1	10,099	Younis Khan	118	213	2000–2017
2	8,832	Javed Miandad	124	189	1976–1993
3	8,829	Inzamam-ul-Haq	119	198	1992–2007
4	7,530	Mohammad Yousuf	90	156	1998–2010
5	7,142	Azhar Ali	97	180	2010–2022
6	5,768	Saleem Malik	103	154	1982–1999
7	5,222	Misbah-ul-Haq	75	132	2001–2017
8	5,062	Zaheer Abbas	78	124	1969–1985
9	4,674	Babar Azam†	64	118	2016–2026
10	4,660	Asad Shafiq	77	128	2010–2020
Last updated: 22 August 2026

==== Fastest runs getter ====
Runs	Batsman	Match	Innings	Record Date	Reference
1000	Saeed Ahmed	11	20	4 December 1959	
2000	Javed Miandad	24	42	16 December 1979	
3000	Javed Miandad	39	67	14 March 1982	
4000	Javed Miandad	53	84	14 September 1983	
5000	Younis Khan	59	106	21 February 2009	
6000	Mohammad Yousuf	72	120	19 November 2006	
7000	Mohammad Yousuf	82	139	20 July 2009	
8000	Javed Miandad	107	162	26 October 1990	
9000	Younis Khan	103	184	22 October 2015	
10000	Younis Khan	116	208	21 April 2017	
Last updated: 20 June 2020

==== Most runs in each batting position ====
Batting position	Batsman	Innings	Runs	Average	Test Career Span	Ref
Opener	Saeed Anwar	86	3,957	47.11	1990–2001	
Number 3	Azhar Ali	121	4,921	43.16	2010–2022	
Number 4	Javed Miandad	140	6,925	54.10	1976–1993	
Number 5	Misbah-ul-Haq	110	4,643	50.47	2001–2017	
Number 6	Asad Shafiq	76	3,011	41.82	2010–2020	
Number 7	Sarfaraz Ahmed †	67	2,051	34.76	2010-2023	
Number 8	Wasim Akram	63	1,353	23.74	1985-2002	
Number 9	Wasim Akram	31	657	21.90	1985-2002	
Number 10	Waqar Younis	48	496	11.81	1989-2003	
Number 11	Danish Kaneria	58	197	6.79	2000–2010	
Last updated: 22 August 2026 Qualification: Batted 20 Innings at the position

==== Most runs against each team ====
Opposition	Runs	Player	Matches	Innings	Period	Ref
Afghanistan	YTP					
Australia	1,797	Javed Miandad	25	40	1976–1990	
Bangladesh	650	Mohammad Hafeez	7	12	2003–2015	
England	1,584	Inzamam-ul-haq	19	32	1992–2006	
India	2,228	Javed Miandad	28	39	1978–1989	
Ireland	83	Faheem Ashraf	1	1	2018–2018	
New Zealand	1,919	Javed Miandad	18	29	1976–1993	
South Africa	990	Younis Khan	14	28	2002–2013	
Sri Lanka	2,286	Younis Khan	29	48	2000–2015	
West Indies	1,214	Mohammad Yousuf	8	14	2000–2006	
Zimbabwe	772	Inzamam-ul-haq	11	19	1993–2002	
Last updated: 10 July 2025

==== Highest individual score ====
Hanif Mohammad set the highest Test score for Pakistan with 337, surpassing Imtiaz Ahmed's 209 scored against New Zealand in October 1955 at Bagh-e-Jinnah. Inzamam-ul-Haq (329), Younis Khan (313) and Azhar Ali (302*) are the only others to sore a triple century for Pakistan.

Rank	Runs	Player	Opposition	Venue	Date
1	337	Hanif Mohammad	West Indies	Kensington Oval, Bridgetown	17 January 1958
2	329	Inzamam-ul-Haq	New Zealand	Gaddafi Stadium, Lahore	1 May 2002
3	313	Younus Khan	Sri Lanka	National Stadium, Karachi	21 February 2009
4	302*	Azhar Ali	West Indies	Dubai International Stadium, Dubai	14 October 2016
5	280*	Javed Miandad	India	Niaz Stadium, Hyderabad	14 January 1983
Last updated: 4 January 2023

==== Highest individual score – progression of record ====
Runs	Player	Opponent	Venue	Season
51	Hanif Mohammad	India	Arun Jaitley Stadium, Delhi, India	1952–53
124*	Nazar Mohammad	India	University Ground, Lucknow, India	1952–53
142	Hanif Mohammad	India	Bahawal Stadium, Bahawalpur, Pakistan	1954–55
209	Imtiaz Ahmed	New Zealand	Bagh-e-Jinnah, Lahore, Pakistan	1955–56
337	Hanif Mohammad	West Indies	Kensington Oval, Bridgetown, Barbados	1957-58
Last updated: 20 June 2020

==== Highest individual score against each team ====
Opposition	Runs	Player	Venue	Date	Ref
Afghanistan	YTP				
Australia	237	Saleem Malik	Rawalpindi Cricket Stadium, Rawalpindi	5 October 1994	
Bangladesh	226	Azhar Ali	Shere Bangla National Stadium, Mirpur	6 May 2015	
England	274	Zaheer Abbas	Edgbaston Cricket Ground, Birmingham	3 June 1971	
India	280*	Javed Miandad	Niaz Stadium, Hyderabad	14 January 1983	
Ireland	83	Faheem Ashraf	Dublin (Malahide), Malahide	11 May 2018	
New Zealand	329	Inzamam-ul-Haq	Gaddafi Stadium, Lahore	1 May 2002	
South Africa	146	Khurram Manzoor	Sheikh Zayed Cricket Stadium, Abu Dhabi	14 October 2013	
Sri Lanka	313	Younus Khan	National Stadium, Karachi	21 February 2009	
West Indies	337	Hanif Mohammad	Kensington Oval, Bridgetown	17 January 1958	
Zimbabwe	257*	Wasim Akram	Sheikhupura Stadium, Sheikhupura	17 October 1996	
Last updated: 12 January 2021.

==== Highest career average ====
A batsman's batting average is the total number of runs they have scored divided by the number of times they have been dismissed.

Pakistan's Javed Miandad, finished his Test career with an average of 52.57. The next closest Pakistani to him is Mohammad Yousuf who retired in 2012 with an average of 52.29.

Rank	Average	Player	Runs	Innings	Period
1	52.57	Javed Miandad	8,832	189	1976–1993
2	52.29	Mohammad Yousuf	7,530	156	1998–2010
3	52.05	Younis Khan	10,099	207	2000–2017
4	50.24	Saud Shakeel	1,658	36	2022–2025
5	50.16	Inzamam-ul-Haq	8,829	198	1992–2007
Qualification: 20 innings. Last updated: 10 July 2025

==== Highest Average in each batting position ====
Batting position	Batsman	Innings	Runs	Average	Career Span	Ref
Opener	Abid Ali	26	1,180	49.16	2019–2021	
Number 3	Younis Khan	83	4,055	51.32	2000–2017	
Number 4	Mohammad Yousuf	63	3,416	56.93	1998-2010	
Number 5	Javed Miandad	33	1,468	54.37	1976-1993	
Number 6	Imran Khan	23	928	61.86	1974-1992	
Number 7	Wasim Raja	31	1,127	43.34	1973-1985	
Number 8	Kamran Akmal	28	874	33.61	2002-2010	
Number 9	Wasim Akram	31	657	21.90	1985-2002	
Number 10	Sarfraz Nawaz	23	352	17.60	1969-1984	
Number 11	Danish Kaneria	20	92	9.20	1989–2003	
Last updated: 8 December 2021. Qualification: Min 20 innings batted at position

==== Most half-centuries ====
A half-century is a score of between 50 and 99 runs. Statistically, once a batsman's score reaches 100, it is no longer considered a half-century but a century.

Joe Root of England and Sachin Tendulkar of India have scored the most half-centuries in Test cricket, with 68 each. They are followed by Rahul Dravid of India with 63 half-centuries, while Ricky Ponting of Australia has 62 fifties to his name, Pakistan's Inzamam-ul-Haq has 46 fifties to his name.

Rank	Half centuries	Player	Innings	Runs	Period
1	46	Inzamam-ul-Haq	198	8,829	1992–2007
2	43	Javed Miandad	189	8,832	1976–1993
3	39	Misbah-ul-Haq	132	5,222	2001–2017
4	35	Azhar Ali	180	7,142	2010–2022
5	33	Babar Azam†	118	4,674	2016–2026
5	33	Mohammad Yousuf	156	7,530	1998–2010
5	33	Younis Khan	213	10,099	2000–2017
Last updated: 22 August 2026

==== Most Test centuries ====
A century is a score of 100 or more runs in a single innings.

Sachin Tendulkar has also scored the most centuries in Test cricket with 51. South Africa's Jacques Kallis is next on 45 and Ricky Ponting from Australia and Joe Root from England with 41 hundreds is in third each. Younis Khan is the highest century-maker for Pakistan.

Rank	Centuries	Player	Innings	Runs	Period
1	34	Younis Khan	213	10,099	2000–2017
2	25	Inzamam-ul-Haq	198	8,829	1992–2007
3	24	Mohammad Yousuf	156	7,530	1998–2010
4	23	Javed Miandad	189	8,832	1976–1993
5	19	Azhar Ali	180	7,142	2010–2022
Last updated: 4 January 2023

==== Most double centuries ====
A double century is a score of 200 or more runs in a single innings.

Dona Bradman holds the Test record scored with twelve for the most double centuries, one ahead of Sri Lanka's Kumar Sangakkara who finished his career with eleven. In third is Brian Lara of the West Indies with nine. England's Wally Hammond and Mahela Jayawardene of Sri Lanka both scored seven, and Miandad and Younis Khan are two of six cricketers who reached the mark on six occasions.

Rank	Double centuries	Player	Innings	Runs	Period
1	6	Younis Khan	213	10,099	2000–2017
1	6	Javed Miandad	189	8,832	1976–1993
3	4	Zaheer Abbas	124	5,062	1969–1985
3	4	Mohammad Yousuf	156	7,530	1998–2010
5	3	Azhar Ali	180	7,142	2010–2022
Last updated: 4 January 2023

==== Most triple centuries ====
A triple century is a score of 300 or more runs in a single innings.

Virender Sehwag of India Sehwag along with Australia's Don Bradman and West Indians Chris Gayle and Brian Lara holds the equal Test record for the most triple centuries scored with two. 4 Pakistani batsmen have scored a single Test triple century as of November 2021.

Rank	Triple centuries	Player	Innings	Runs	Period
1	1	Hanif Mohammad	97	3,915	1952–1969
1	1	Inzamam-ul-Haq	198	8,829	1992–2007
1	1	Younis Khan	213	10,099	2000–2017
1	1	Azhar Ali	180	7,142	2010–2022
Last updated: 4 January 2023

==== Most Sixes ====
Rank	Sixes	Player	Innings	Runs	Period
1	81	Misbah-ul-Haq	132	5,222	2001–2017
2	70	Younis Khan	213	10,099	2000–2017
3	57	Wasim Akram	147	2,898	1985–2002
4	55	Imran Khan	126	3,807	1971–1992
5	52	Shahid Afridi	48	1,716	1998–2010
Last updated: 20 June 2020

==== Most Fours ====
Rank	Fours	Player	Innings	Runs	Period
1	1105	Inzamam-ul-Haq	198	8,829	1992–2007
2	1082	Younis Khan	213	10,099	2000–2017
3	957	Mohammad Yousuf	156	7,530	1998–2010
4	809	Javed Miandad	189	8,832	1976–1993
5	678	Saleem Malik	154	5,768	1982–1999
Last updated: 20 June 2020

==== Most runs in a series ====
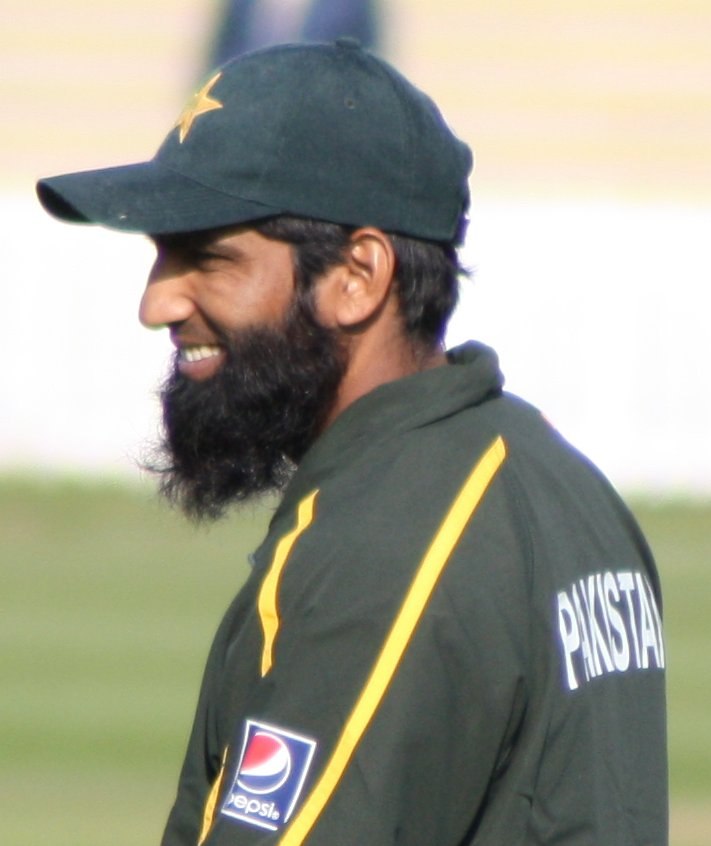
Mohammad Yousuf scored 665 at the average of 133.00 against the West Indies in 2006–07.

Test cricket is the oldest form of cricket played at international level. The 1930 Ashes series in England saw Bradman set the record for the most runs scored in a single series, falling just 26 short of 1,000 runs. He is followed by Wally Hammond with 905 runs scored in the 1928–29 Ashes series. Mark Taylor with 839 in the 1989 Ashes and Neil Harvey with 834 in 1952–53 South Africa series are third and fourth on the list, respectively. Pakistani cricketer Mudassar Nazar is seventeenth in the list with 761.

Rank	Runs	Player	Matches	Innings	Series
1	761	Mudassar Nazar	6	8	Indian cricket team in Pakistan in 1982–83
2	665	Mohammad Yousuf	3	5	West Indian cricket team in Pakistan in 2006–07
3	650	Zaheer Abbas	6	6	Indian cricket team in Pakistan in 1982–83
4	631	Mohammad Yousuf	4	7	Pakistani cricket team in England in 2006
5	628	Hanif Mohammad	5	9	Pakistani cricket team in the West Indies in 1957–58
Last updated: 31 August 2017

==== Most ducks ====
A duck refers to a batsman dismissed without scoring a run. West Indian Courtney Walsh has the most ducks to his name with 43. Pakistan's Danish Kaneria has scored the ninth-highest number of ducks in Test cricket along with Indian cricketer Ishant Sharma with 25.

Rank	Ducks	Player	Matches	Innings	Period
1	25	Danish Kaneria	61	84	2000–2010
2	21	Waqar Younis	87	120	1989–2003
3	19	Wasim Bari	81	112	1967–1984
3	19	Younis Khan	118	213	2000–2017
3	19	Azhar Ali	97	180	2010–2022
Last updated: 4 January 2023

== Bowling records ==
=== Most career wickets ===
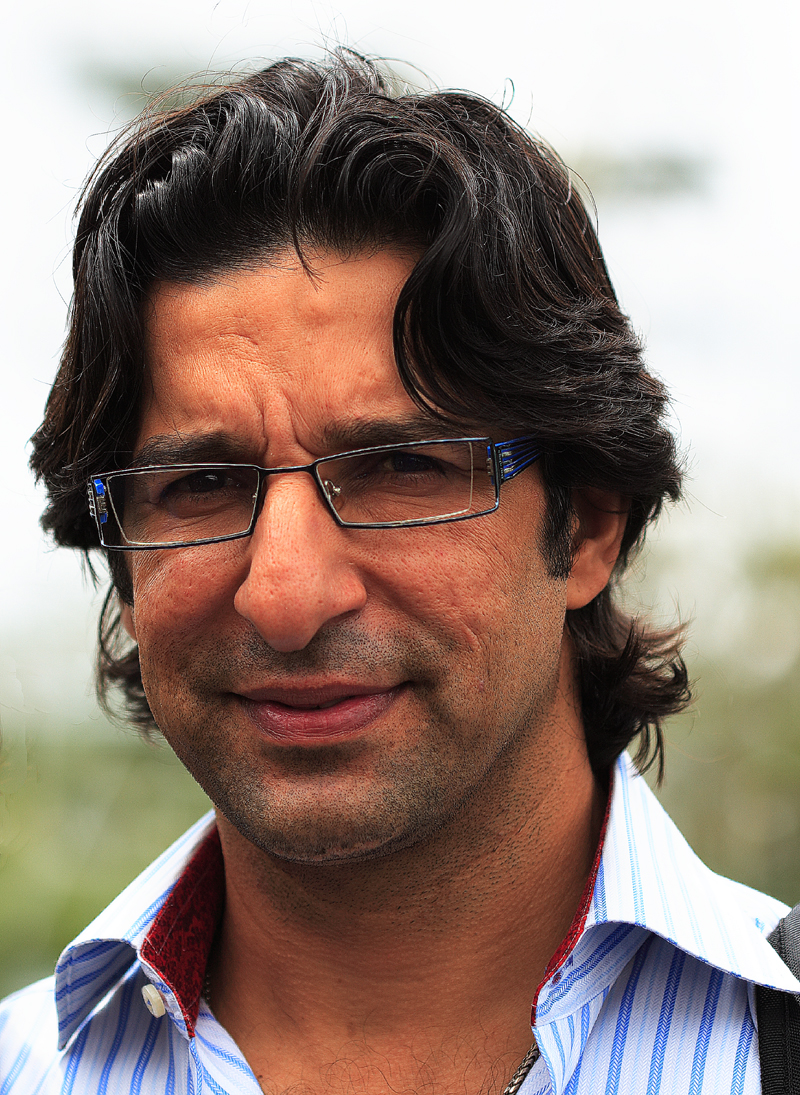
Wasim Akram has taken the most Test wickets (414) for Pakistan.

A bowler takes the wicket of a batsman when the form of dismissal is bowled, caught, leg before wicket, stumped or hit wicket. If the batsman is dismissed by run out, obstructing the field, handling the ball, hitting the ball twice or timed out the bowler does not receive credit.

Shane Warne held the record for the most Test wickets with 708 until December 2007 when Sri Lankan bowler Muttiah Muralitharan passed Warne's milestone. Muralitharan, who continued to play until 2010, finished with 800 wickets to his name. James Anderson of England is third on the list taking 632 wickets holds the record for most wickets by a fast bowler in Test cricket. Wasim Akram is the highest wicket taker for Pakistan with 414.

Rank	Wickets	Player	Matches	Innings	Period
1	414	Wasim Akram	104	181	1985–2002
2	373	Waqar Younis	87	154	1989–2003
3	362	Imran Khan	88	142	1971–1992
4	261	Danish Kaneria	61	112	2000–2010
5	244	Yasir Shah	48	89	2014–2022
6	236	Abdul Qadir	67	111	1977–1990
7	208	Saqlain Mushtaq	49	86	1995–2004
8	185	Mushtaq Ahmed	52	89	1990–2003
9	178	Shoaib Akhtar	56	82	1997–2007
10	178	Saeed Ajmal	35	67	2009–2014
Last updated: 22 August 2026

==== Most career wickets against each team ====
Opposition	Wickets	Player	Matches	Innings	Runs	Period	Ref
Afghanistan	YTP						
Australia	64	Imran Khan	18	29	1,598	1976–1990	
Bangladesh	34	Danish Kaneria	5	10	558	2001–2003	
England	82	Abdul Qadir	16	28	2,049	1977–1987	
India	94	Imran Khan	23	38	2,260	1978–1989	
Ireland	9	Mohammad Abbas	1	2	110	2018-2018	
New Zealand	70	Waqar Younis	13	25	1,372	1990–2002	
South Africa	36	Danish Kaneria	7	14	1,096	2003–2007	
Sri Lanka	66	Saeed Ajmal	14	28	2,170	2009–2014	
West Indies	80	Imran Khan	18	29	1,695	1977–1990	
Zimbabwe	62	Waqar Younis	11	20	1,233	1993–2002	
Last updated: 12 January 2021

==== Fastest wicket taker ====
Wickets	Bowler	Match	Record Date	Reference
50	Yasir Shah	9	25 June 2015	
100	Yasir Shah	17	13 October 2016	
150	Waqar Younis	27	10 February 1994	
200	Yasir Shah	33 ♠	3 December 2018	
250	Waqar Younis	51	6 March 1998	
300	Waqar Younis	65	14 June 2000	
350	Waqar Younis	78	3 February 2002	
400	Wasim Akram	96	14 June 2000	
Last updated: 20 June 2020

==== Best figures in an innings ====
Bowling figures refers to the number of the wickets a bowler has taken and the number of runs conceded.

There has been two occasions in Test cricket where a bowler has taken all ten wickets in a single innings – Jim Laker of England took 10/53 against Australia in 1956 and India's Anil Kumble in 1999 returned figures of 10/74 against Pakistan. Abdul Qadir is one of 15 bowlers who has taken nine wickets in a Test match innings.

Rank	Figures	Player	Opposition	Venue	Date
1	9/56	Abdul Qadir	England	Gaddafi Stadium, Lahore	25 November 1987
2	9/86	Sarfraz Nawaz	Australia	Melbourne Cricket Ground, Melbourne	10 March 1979
3	8/41	Yasir Shah†	New Zealand	Dubai International Stadium, Dubai	27 November 2018
4	8/42	Sajid Khan†	Bangladesh	Sher-e-Bangla National Cricket Stadium, Mirpur	8 December 2021
5	8/46	Nauman Ali	England	Multan Cricket Stadium, Multan	15 October 2024
Last updated: 8 December 2021

==== Best figures in a match ====
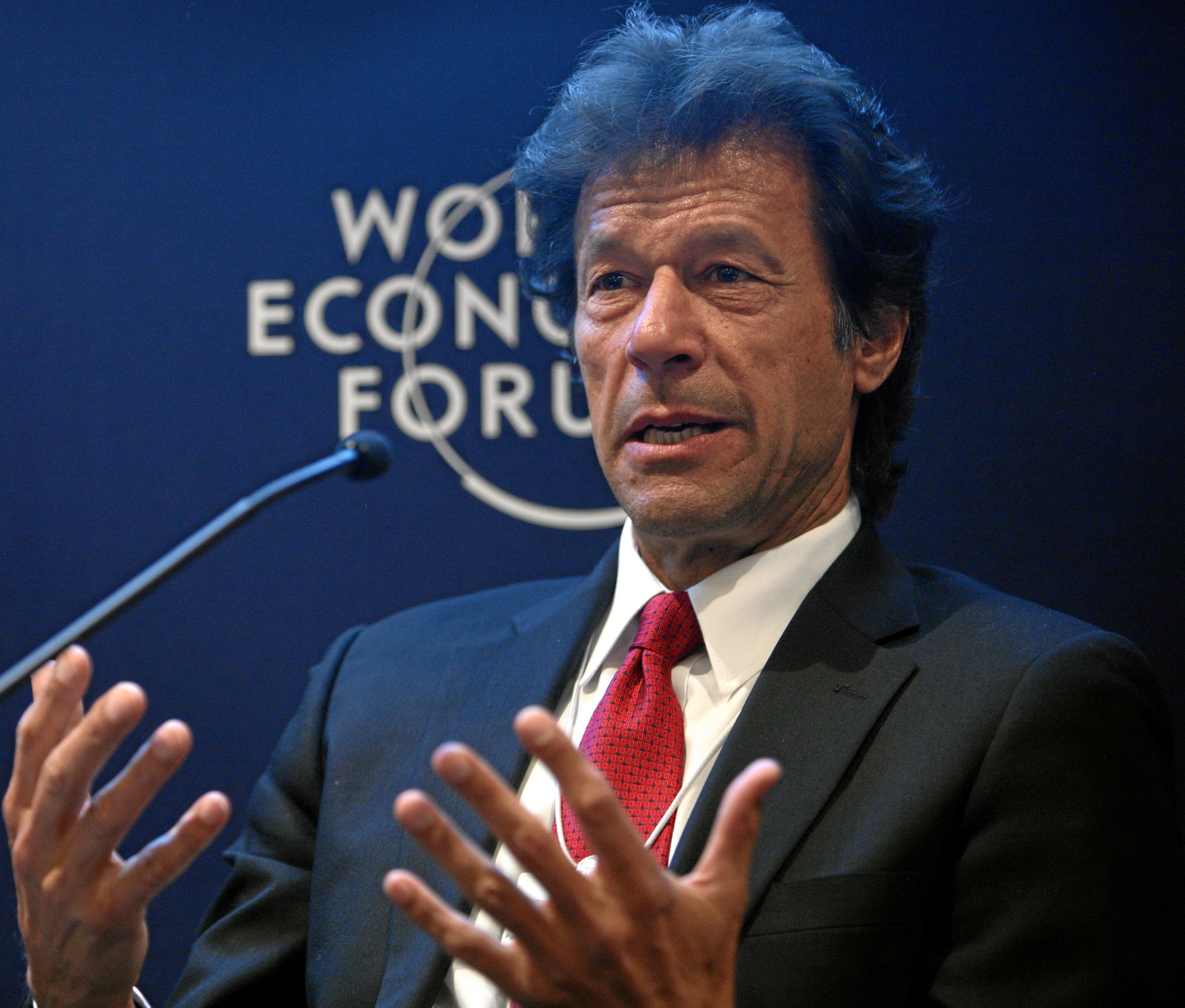
Imran Khan has the best bowling figures in a match (14/119) for Pakistan.

A bowler's bowling figures in a match is sum of the wickets taken and the runs conceded in two innings.

No bowler in the history of Test cricket has taken all 20 wickets in a match. The closest to do so was English spin bowler Jim Laker. During the fourth Test of the 1956 Ashes series, Laker took 9/37 in the first innings and 10/53 in the second to finish with match figures of 19/90. Imran Khan's figures of 14/119, taken in final match of the 1981–82 Test series against Sri Lanka, is the sixteenth-best in Test cricket history.

Rank	Figures	Player	Opposition	Venue	Date
1	14/119	Imran Khan	Sri Lanka	Gaddafi Stadium, Lahore	22 March 1982
2	14/184	Yasir Shah†	New Zealand	Dubai Cricket Stadium, Dubai	24 November 2018
3	13/101	Abdul Qadir	England	Gaddafi Stadium, Lahore	25 November 1987
4	13/114	Fazal Mahmood	England	National Stadium, Karachi	11 October 1956
5	13/135	Waqar Younis	Zimbabwe	National Stadium, Karachi	1 December 1993
Last updated: 29 December 2018

==== Best figures in an innings against each team ====
Opposition	Figures	Player	Venue	Date	Reference
Afghanistan	YTP				
Australia	9/86	Sarfraz Nawaz	Melbourne Cricket Ground, Melbourne	10 March 1979	
Bangladesh	8/42	Sajid Khan†	Shere Bangla National Stadium, Mirpur	3 December 2021	
England	9/56	Abdul Qadir	Gaddafi Stadium, Lahore	25 November 1987	
India	8/60	Imran Khan	National Stadium, Karachi	23 December 1982	
Ireland	5/66	Mohammad Abbas	Dublin (Malahide), Malahide	11 May 2018	
New Zealand	8/41	Yasir Shah†	Dubai International Stadium, Dubai	27 November 2018	
South Africa	6/78	Mushtaq Ahmed	Kingsmead, Durban	26 February 1998	
Sri Lanka	8/58	Imran Khan	Gaddafi Stadium, Lahore	22 March 1982	
West Indies	7/80	Imran Khan	Bourda, Georgetown	2 April 1988	
Zimbabwe	7/66	Saqlain Mushtaq	Queens Sports Club, Bulawayo	16 November 2002	
Last updated: 8 December 2021

==== Best career average ====
A bowler's bowling average is the total number of runs they have conceded divided by the number of wickets they have taken.

Nineteenth century English medium pacer George Lohmann holds the record for the best career average in Test cricket with 10.75. J. J. Ferris, one of fourteen cricketers to play Test cricket for more than one team, is second behind Lohmann with an overall career average of 12.70 runs per wicket. Hasan Ali's bowling average of 22.09 are the best figures for Pakistan.

Rank	Average	Player	Wickets	Runs	Balls	Period
1	22.81	Imran Khan	362	8,258	19,458	1971–1992
2	22.84	Mohammad Abbas†	119	2,719	6,477	2017–2026
3	23.03	Shabbir Ahmed	51	1,175	2,576	2003–2005
4	23.56	Waqar Younis	373	8,788	16,224	1989–2003
5	23.62	Wasim Akram	414	9,779	22,627	1985–2002
Qualification: 2,000 balls. Last updated: 22 August 2026

==== Best career economy rate ====
A bowler's economy rate is the total number of runs they have conceded divided by the number of overs they have bowled.

English bowler William Attewell, who played 10 matches for England between 1884 and 1892, holds the Test record for the best career economy rate with 1.31. Pervez Sajjad, with a rate of 2.04 runs per over conceded over his 19-match Test career, is the best for Pakistan.

Rank	Economy rate	Player	Runs	Balls	Wickets	Period
1	2.04	Pervez Sajjad	1,410	4,145	59	1964–1973
2	2.06	Mohammad Nazir	1,124	3,262	34	1969–1983
3	2.07	Shujauddin Butt	801	2,313	20	1954–1962
4	2.09	Fazal Mahmood	3,434	9,834	139	1952–1962
5	2.11	Abdul Hafeez Kardar	954	2,712	21	1952–1958
Qualification: 2,000 balls. Last updated: 4 September 2017

==== Best career strike rate ====
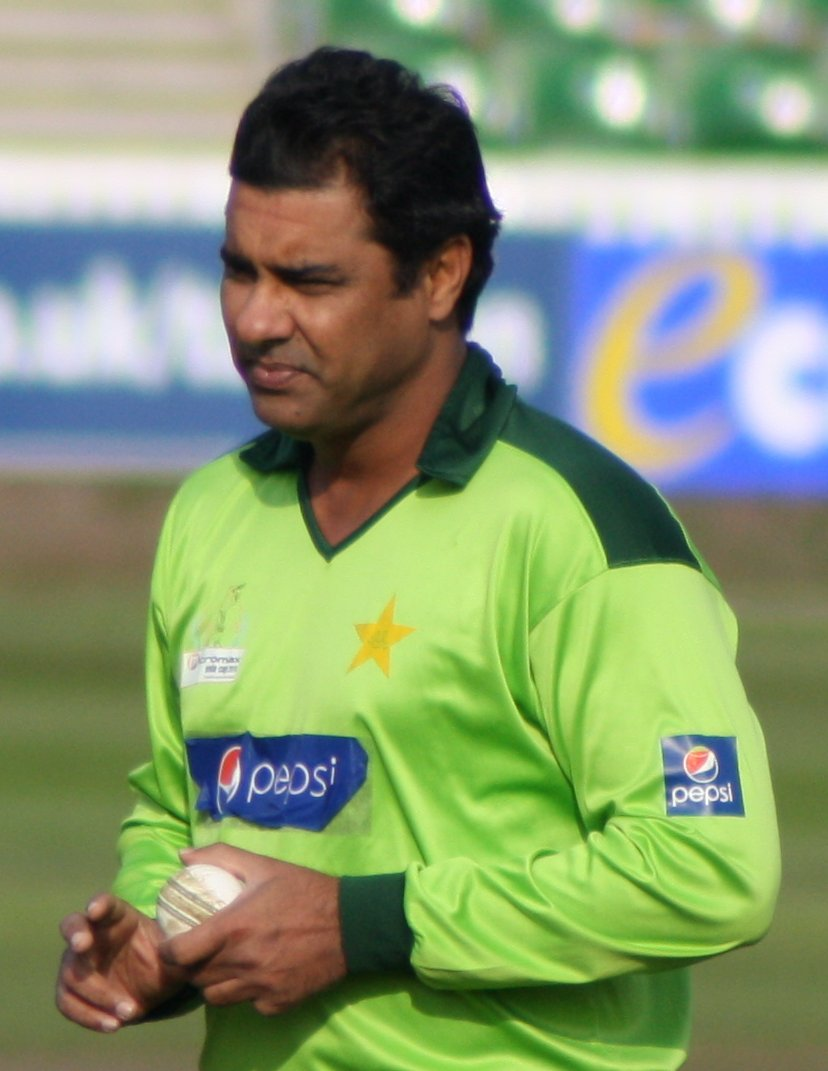
Waqar Younis holds the Pakistani record for the best Test career strike rate, with figures of 43.4.

A bowler's strike rate is the total number of balls they have bowled divided by the number of wickets they have taken.

English George Lohmann has best Test career strike rate with 34.1; Waqar Younis of Pakistan with an overall career strike rate of 43.4 balls per wicket, is eighth in the list.

Rank	Strike rate	Player	Wickets	Balls	Runs	Period
1	43.4	Waqar Younis	373	16,224	8,788	1989–2003
2	45.7	Shoaib Akhtar	178	8,143	4,574	1997–2007
3	47.8	Sajid Khan	59	2,823	1,610	2021–2025
4	48.7	Mohammad Asif	106	5,171	2,583	2005–2010
5	49.3	Noman Ali	83	4,096	2,055	2021–2025
Qualification: 2,000 balls. Last updated: 10 July 2025

==== Most five-wicket hauls in an innings ====
A five-wicket haul refers to a bowler taking five wickets in a single innings.

Sri Lanka's Muttiah Muralitharan has taken the most number five-wicket hauls in Test cricket with 67 throughout his career. former Pakistani captain Wasim Akram is tenth on the list and leading the equivalent list for Pakistan.

Rank	Five-wicket hauls	Player	Wickets	Innings	Balls	Period
1	25	Wasim Akram	414	181	22,627	1985–2002
2	23	Imran Khan	362	142	19,458	1971–1992
3	22	Waqar Younis	373	154	16,224	1989–2003
4	16	Yasir Shah †	235	85	13,697	2014–2021
5	15	Abdul Qadir	236	111	17,126	1977–1990
5	15	Danish Kaneria	261	112	17,697	2000–2010
Last updated: 15 August 2021

==== Most ten-wicket hauls in a match ====
A ten-wicket haul refers to a bowler taking ten or more wickets in a match over two innings.

Muttiah Muralitharan of Sri Lanka has taken the most ten-wicket hauls in Test cricket with 22. Imran Khan, jointly tenth with Derek Underwood of England, leads the equivalent list for Pakistan with 6 ten-wicket hauls.

Rank	Ten-wicket hauls	Player	Matches	Balls	Wickets	Period
1	6	Imran Khan	88	19,458	362	1971–1992
2	5	Waqar Younis	87	16,224	373	1989–2003
2	5	Abdul Qadir	67	17,126	236	1977–1990
2	5	Wasim Akram	104	22,627	414	1985–2002
5	4	Fazal Mahmood	34	9,834	139	1952–1962
Last updated: 4 September 2017

==== Worst figures in an innings ====
The worst figures in a single innings in Test cricket came in the third Test between the West Indies at home to Pakistan in 1958. Pakistan's Khan Mohammad returned figures of 0/259 from his 54 overs in the second innings of the match.

Rank	Figures	Player	Overs	Opposition	Venue	Date
1	0/259 ♠	Khan Mohammad	54	West Indies	Sabina Park, Jamaica	26 February 1958
2	0/197	Yasir Shah	32	Australia	Adelaide Oval, Adelaide	29 November 2019
3	0/183	Danish Kaneria	47	Sri Lanka	Gaddafi Stadium, Lahore	1 March 2009
4	0/159	Zafar Gohar	32	New Zealand	Basin Reserve, Christchurch	3 January 2021
5	0/156	Iqbal Qasim	56	Australia	Iqbal Stadium, Faisalabad	6 March 1980
Last updated: 8 February 2021

==== Worst figures in a match ====
The worst figures in a match in Test cricket were taken by South Africa's Imran Tahir in the 2006 Boxing Day Test match against Australia. He returned figures of 0/180 from his 23 overs in the first innings and 0/80 off 14 in the third innings for a total 0/260 from 37 overs. He claimed the record in his final over when two runs came from it—enough for him to pass the previous record of 0/259, set 48 years prior by Pakistan's Khan Mohammad.

Rank	Figures	Player	Overs	Opposition	Venue	Date
1	0/259	Khan Mohammad	54	West Indies	Sabina Park, Jamaica	26 February 1958
2	0/197	Yasir Shah	32	Australia	Adelaide Oval, Adelaide	29 November 2019
3	0/183	Danish Kaneria	47	Sri Lanka	Gaddafi Stadium, Lahore	1 March 2009
4	0/164	Sohail Khan	27	Sri Lanka	National Stadium, Karachi	21 February 2009
5	0/160	Aaqib Javed	47	New Zealand	Basin Reserve, Wellington	10 February 1989
Last updated: 8 February 2021

==== Most wickets in a series ====
South Africa's seventh Test tour of England in 1913–14 saw the record set for the most wickets taken by a bowler in a Test series. English paceman Sydney Barnes played in four of the five matches and achieved a total of 49 wickets to his name. Jim Laker sits second on the list with 46 wickets taken during the 1956 Ashes series. Pakistan's Imran Khan is seventh with his 40 wickets taken against India during the 1982–83 tour.

Rank	Wickets	Player	Matches	Series
1	40	Imran Khan	6	Indian cricket team in Pakistan in 1982–83
2	30	Abdul Qadir	3	English cricket team in Pakistan in 1987–88
3	29	Waqar Younis	3	New Zealand cricket team in Pakistan in 1990–91
3	29	Yasir Shah†	3	New Zealand cricket team in UAE in 2018–19
5	27	Waqar Younis	3	Zimbabwean cricket team in Pakistan in 1993–94
Last updated: 10 July 2025

==== Hat-trick ====
In cricket, a hat-trick occurs when a bowler takes three wickets with consecutive deliveries. The deliveries may be interrupted by an over bowled by another bowler from the other end of the pitch or the other team's innings, but must be three consecutive deliveries by the individual bowler in the same match. Only wickets attributed to the bowler count towards a hat-trick; run outs do not count. In Test cricket history there have been just 44 hat-tricks, the first achieved by Fred Spofforth for Australia against England in 1879. In 1912, Australian Jimmy Matthews achieved the feat twice in one game against South Africa. The only other players to achieve two hat-tricks are Australia's Hugh Trumble, against England in 1902 and 1904, Pakistan's Wasim Akram, in separate games against Sri Lanka in 1999, and England's Stuart Broad.

No.	Bowler	Against	Inn.	Test	Dismissals	Venue	Date	Ref.
1	Wasim Akram	Sri Lanka	1	3/4	Romesh Kaluwitharana (c Moin Khan); Niroshan Bandaratilleke (b); Pramodya Wickramasinghe (b)	(Pakistan) Gaddafi Stadium, Lahore	6 March 1999	
2	Wasim Akram	Sri Lanka	2	4/4	Avishka Gunawardene (c Shahid Afridi); Chaminda Vaas (b); Mahela Jayawardene (c Wajahatullah Wasti)	(Bangladesh) Bangabandhu National Stadium, Dhaka	14 March 1999	
3	Abdul Razzaq	Sri Lanka	1	2/3	Romesh Kaluwitharana (c Moin Khan); Rangana Herath (lbw); Ravi Pushpakumara (lbw)	(Sri Lanka) Galle International Stadium, Galle	21 June 2000	
4	Mohammad Sami	Sri Lanka	1	3/3	Charitha Buddhika (lbw); Nuwan Zoysa (lbw); Muttiah Muralitharan (b)	(Pakistan) Gaddafi Stadium, Lahore	8 March 2002	
5	Naseem Shah	Bangladesh	2	2/2	Nazmul Hossain Shanto (lbw); Taijul Islam (lbw); Mahmudullah Riyad (c Haris Sohail)	(Pakistan) Rawalpindi Cricket Stadium, Rawalpindi	9 February 2020	

== Wicket-keeping records ==
The wicket-keeper is a specialist fielder who stands behind the stumps being guarded by the batsman on strike and is the only member of the fielding side permitted to wear gloves and external leg guards.

=== Most career dismissals ===
A wicket-keeper can be credited with the dismissal of batsman in two ways, caught or stumped. A fair catch is a taken when the ball is caught fully within the field of play without it bouncing when the ball has touched the striker's bat or glove holding the bat, while a stumping occurs when the wicket-keeper puts down the wicket while the batsman out of his ground and not attempting a run.

Pakistan's Wasim Bari is eleventh in taking most dismissals in Test cricket as a designated wicket-keeper with 228.

Rank	Dismissals	Player	Matches	Period
1	228	Wasim Bari	81	1967–1984
2	206	Kamran Akmal	53	2002–2010
3	182	Sarfraz Ahmed	54	2010–2023
4	147	Moin Khan	69	1990–2004
5	133	Mohmmad Rizwan†	46	2016–2026
Last updated: 22 August 2026

=== Most career catches ===
Bari leads in the list of most catches taken as a designated wicket-keeper in Test cricket for Pakistan, with 201.

Rank	Dismissals	Player	Matches	Period
1	228	Wasim Bari	81	1967–1984
2	206	Kamran Akmal	53	2002–2010
3	183	Sarfraz Ahmed †	38	2010–2019
4	147	Moin Khan	69	1990–2004
5	133	Mohammad Rizwan	37	1992–2003
Last updated: 22 August 2026

=== Most career stumpings ===
Bert Oldfield, Australia's fifth-most capped wicket-keeper, holds the record for most stumpings in Test cricket with 52. He is followed by England's Godfrey Evans with 46 to his name. Indian glovemen Syed Kirmani and MS Dhoni are both equal third on 38 and Bari is eighth in the list with 27.

Rank	Stumpings	Player	Matches	Period
1	27	Wasim Bari	81	1967–1984
2	22	Kamran Akmal	53	2002–2010
3	20	Moin Khan	69	1990–2004
5	18	Sarfraz Ahmed †	38	2010–2019
5	16	Imtiaz Ahmed	38	1952–1962
Last updated: 6 September 2017

=== Most dismissals in an innings ===
Four wicket-keepers have taken seven wickets in a single innings in a Test match—Wasim Bari of Pakistan in 1979, Englishman Bob Taylor in 1980, New Zealand's Ian Smith in 1991 and most recently West Indian gloveman Ridley Jacobs against Australia in 2000.

The feat of taking 6 wickets in an innings has been achieved by 22 wicket-keepers on 30 occasions including two Pakistanis.

Rank	Dismissals	Player	Opposition	Venue	Date
1	7	Wasim Bari	New Zealand	Eden Park, Auckland	23 February 1979
2	6	Rashid Latif	Zimbabwe	Queens Sports Club, Bulawayo	14 March 1998
2	6	Adnan Akmal	New Zealand	Basin Reserve, Wellington	15 January 2011
Last updated: 6 September 2017

=== Most dismissals in a match ===
Three wicket-keepers have made 11 dismissals in a Test match, Englishman Jack Russell in 1995, South African AB de Villiers in 2013 and most recently India's Rishabh Pant against Australia in 2018.

The feat of making 10 dismissals in a match has been achieved by 4 wicket-keepers on 4 occasions with Sarfaraz Ahmed being the only Pakistani wicket-keeper.

Rank	Dismissals	Player	Opposition	Venue	Date
1	10	Sarfaraz Ahmed	South Africa	New Wanderers Stadium, Johannesburg, South Africa	11 January 2019
2	9	Rashid Latif	New Zealand	Eden Park, Auckland, New Zealand	10 February 1994
2	9	Kamran Akmal	West Indies	Sabina Park, Kingston, Jamaica	3 June 2005
4	8	Wasim Bari	England	Headingley, Leeds, England	8 July 1971
4	8	Rashid Latif	Australia	Sydney Cricket Ground, Sydney, Australia	30 November 1995
4	8	Kamran Akmal	Sri Lanka	Galle International Stadium, Galle, Sri Lanka	4 July 2009
4	8	Kamran Akmal	England	The Oval, London, England	18 August 2010
4	8	Adnan Akmal	New Zealand	Basin Reserve, Wellington, New Zealand	15 January 2011
Last updated: 23 August 2020

=== Most dismissals in a series ===
Brad Haddin holds the Test cricket record for the most dismissals taken by a wicket-keeper in a series. He took 29 catches during the 2013 Ashes series which broke the previous record held by fellow Australian Rod Marsh where he took 28 catches in the 1982–83 Ashes series. Rashid Latif has the most dismissals for Pakistan in a Test series.

Rank	Dismissals	Player	Matches	Series
1	18	Rashid Latif	3	Bangladeshi cricket team in Pakistan in 2003
2	17	Kamran Akmal	3	Pakistani cricket team in England in 2010
2	17	Wasim Bari	6	Indian cricket team in Pakistan in 1982–83
4	16	Kamran Akmal	2	Pakistani cricket team in the West Indies in 2005
4	16	Kamran Akmal	4	Pakistani cricket team in England in 2006
4	16	Wasim Bari	5	Pakistani cricket team in the West Indies in 1976–77
4	16	Wasim Bari	6	Pakistani cricket team in India in 1979–80
Last updated: 6 September 2017

== Fielding records ==
=== Most career catches ===
Caught is one of the ten methods a batsman can be dismissed in cricket. A fair catch is defined as a fielder catches the ball, from a legal delivery, fully within the field of play without it bouncing when the ball has touched the striker's bat or glove holding the bat. The majority of catches are caught in the slips, located behind the batsman, next to the wicket-keeper, on the off side of the field. Most slip fielders are top order batsmen.

India's Rahul Dravid holds the record for the most catches in Test cricket by a non-wicket-keeper with 210, followed by Mahela Jayawardene of Sri Lanka on 205 and South African Jacques Kallis with 200. Younis Khan is the highest-ranked Pakistani and twelfth overall, securing 139 catches in his Test career.

Rank	Catches	Player	Matches	Period
1	139	Younis Khan	118	2000–2017
2	93	Javed Miandad	124	1976–1996
3	81	Inzamam-ul-Haq	119	1992–1999
4	77	Asad Shafiq	77	2010-2020
5	66	Azhar Ali	97	2010–2022
Last updated: 10 July 2025

==== Most catches in a series ====
The 1920–21 Ashes series, in which Australia whitewashed England 5–0 for the first time, saw the record set for the most catches taken by non-wicket-keeper in a Test series. Australian all-rounder Jack Gregory took 15 catches in the series as well as 23 wickets. Greg Chappell, a fellow Australian all-rounder, is second behind Gregory with 14 catches taken during the 1974–75 Ashes series. Three players have taken 13 catches in a series on five occasions with both Bob Simpson and Brian Lara having done so twice and Rahul Dravid once. Younis Khan has taken 10 catches, the most by a Pakistani.

Rank	Catches	Player	Matches	Series
1	10	Younis Khan	3	Pakistan in West Indies in 2017
2	9	Taufeeq Umar	2	South Africa in Pakistan in 2003
2	9	Younis Khan	3	Pakistan in South Africa in 2007
2	9	Wallis Mathias	5	Pakistan in the West Indies in 1958
5	8	Javed Miandad	6	Pakistan in India in 1979-80
5	8	Mohammad Yousuf	3	England in Pakistan in 2000
Last updated: 14 October 2017

=== All-round records ===
==== 1000 runs and 100 wickets ====
A total of 71 players have achieved the double of 1000 runs and 100 wickets in their Test career.

Rank	Player	Average Difference	Period	Matches	Runs	Bat Avg	Wickets	Bowl Avg
1	Imran Khan	14.88	1971-1992	88	3807	37.69	362	22.81
2	Wasim Akram	-0.98	1985-2002	104	2898	22.64	414	23.62
3	Abdul Razzaq	-8.32	1999-2006	46	1946	28.61	100	36.94
4	Waqar Younis	-13.35	1989-2003	87	1010	10.2	373	23.56
5	Intikhab Alam	-13.66	1959-1977	47	1493	22.28	125	35.95
6	Sarfraz Nawaz	-15.04	1969-1984	55	1045	17.71	177	32.75
7	Abdul Qadir	-17.21	1977-1990	67	1029	15.59	236	32.8
Last updated: 22 August 2020

== Other records ==
=== Most career matches ===
India's Sachin Tendulkar holds the record for the most Test matches played with 200 with former captains in Ricky Ponting and Steve Waugh being joint second with each having represented Australia on 168 occasions. Javed Miandad played for Pakistan in 124 matches.

Rank	Matches	Player	Period
1	124	Javed Miandad	1976–1996
2	119	Inzamam-ul-Haq	1992–2007
3	118	Younis Khan	2000–2017
4	104	Wasim Akram	1985–2002
5	103	Saleem Malik	1982–1999
Last updated: 15 October 2017

=== Most consecutive career matches ===
Former English captain Alastair Cook holds the record for the most consecutive Test matches played with 159. He broke Allan Border's long standing record of 153 matches in June 2018. Asad Shafiq, the Pakistan batsmen has played in 72 consecutive Test matches.

Rank	Matches	Player	Period
1	72	Asad Shafiq	2011-2020
2	53	Javed Miandad	1977-1984
Last updated: 25 August 2020

=== Most matches as captain ===
Graeme Smith, who led the South African cricket team from 2003 to 2014, holds the record for the most matches played as captain in Test cricket with 109. Allan Border, the man who skippered Australia from 1984 to 1994 is second with 93 matches. New Zealand's captain from 1997 to 2006, Stephen Fleming, is third on the list with 80 and in fourth on 77 is Australia's Ricky Ponting who led the side for six years from 2004 to 2010. Pakistan's Misbah-ul-Haq is ninth in the list along with Sri Lankan Arjuna Ranatunga.

Rank	Matches	Player	Period
1	56	Misbah-ul-Haq	2010–2017
2	48	Imran Khan	1982–1992
3	34	Javed Miandad	1980–1993
4	31	Inzamam-ul-Haq	2001–2007
5	25	Wasim Akram	1993–1999
Last updated: 25 May 2017

=== Youngest players ===
The youngest player to play in a Test match is claimed to be Hasan Raza at the age of 14 years and 227 days. Making his debut for Pakistan against Zimbabwe on 24 October 1996, there is some doubt as to the validity of Raza's age at the time. The second- and third-youngest players are also from Pakistan—Mushtaq Mohammad and Aaqib Javed at 15 years and 124 days and 16 years and 189 days, respectively.

Rank	Age	Player	Opposition	Venue	Date
1	14 years and 227 days ♠	Hasan Raza	Zimbabwe	Iqbal Stadium, Faisalabad	24 October 1996
2	15 years and 124 days	Mushtaq Mohammad	West Indies	Gaddafi Stadium, Lahore	16 March 1959
3	16 years and 189 days	Aaqib Javed	New Zealand	Basin Reserve, Wellington	10 February 1989
4	16 years and 221 days	Aftab Baloch	New Zealand	Bangabandhu National Stadium, Dhaka	8 November 1969
5	16 years and 248 days	Nasim-ul-Ghani	West Indies	Kensington Oval, Bridgetown, Barbados	17 January 1958
Last updated: 15 October 2017

=== Oldest players on debut ===
At 49 years and 119 days, James Southerton of England, playing in the very first Test match in March 1877, is the oldest player to make his debut in Test cricket. Second on the list is Miran Bakhsh of Pakistan who at 47 years and 284 days made his debut against India in 1955. Australia's Don Blackie is the third-oldest player to make his debut, breaking into the side during the second Test of the 1928–29 Ashes series at the age of 46 years and 253 days.

Rank	Age	Player	Opposition	Venue	Date
1	47 years and 284 days	Miran Bakhsh	India	Bagh-e-Jinnah, Lahore	29 January 1955
2	36 years and 146 days	Tabish Khan	Zimbabwe	Harare Sports Club, Harare	7 May 2021
3	34 years and 308 days	Zulfiqar Babar	South Africa	Sheikh Zayed Cricket Stadium, Abu Dhabi	14 October 2013
4	34 years and 177 days	Aslam Khokhar	England	Trent Bridge, Nottingham	1 July 1954
5	34 years and 111 days	Nauman Ali	South Africa	National Stadium, Karachi	26 January 2021
Last updated: 10 May 2021

=== Oldest players ===
England all-rounder Wilfred Rhodes is the oldest player to appear in a Test match. Playing in the fourth Test against the West Indies in 1930 at Sabina Park, in Kingston, Jamaica, he was aged 52 years and 165 days on the final day's play. The oldest Pakistani Test player is Miran Bakhsh who was aged 47 years and 298 days when he represented Pakistan for the final time in the 1955 tour of India at the Peshawar Club Ground.

Rank	Age	Player	Opposition	Venue	Date
1	47 years and 298 days	Miran Bakhsh	India	Peshawar Club Ground, Peshawar	12 February 1955
2	44 years and 104 days	Amir Elahi	India	Eden Gardens, Kolkata	12 December 1952
3	42 years and 347 days	Misbah-ul-Haq	West Indies	Windsor Park, Roseau	10 May 2017
4	39 years and 162 days	Younis Khan	West Indies	Windsor Park, Roseau	10 May 2017
5	39 years and 135 days	Younis Ahmed	India	Sardar Patel Stadium, Ahmedabad	4 March 1987
Last updated: 28 January 2021

== Partnership records ==
In cricket, two batsman are always present at the crease batting together in a partnership. This partnership will continue until one of them is dismissed, retires or the innings comes to a close.

=== Highest partnerships by wicket ===
A wicket partnership describes the number of runs scored before each wicket falls. The first wicket partnership is between the opening batsman and continues until the first wicket falls. The second wicket partnership then commences between the not out batsman and the number three batsman. This partnership continues until the second wicket falls. The third wicket partnership then commences between the not out batsman and the new batsman. This continues down to tenth wicket partnership. When the eleventh wicket has fallen, there is no more batsman left so the innings is closed.

Wicket	Runs	First batsman	Second batsman	Opposition	Venue	Date
1st wicket	298	Aamer Sohail	Ijaz Ahmed	West Indies	National Stadium, Karachi	6 December 1997
2nd wicket	291	Zaheer Abbas	Mushtaq Mohammad	England	Edgbaston, Birmingham	3 June 1971
3rd wicket	451	Mudassar Nazar	Javed Miandad	India	Niaz Stadium, Hyderabad, Sindh	14 January 1983
4th wicket	350	Mushtaq Mohammad	Asif Iqbal	New Zealand	Carisbrook, Dunedin	7 February 1973
5th wicket	281	Javed Miandad	Asif Iqbal	New Zealand	Gaddafi Stadium, Lahore	9 October 1976
6th wicket	269	Mohammad Yousuf	Kamran Akmal	England	Gaddafi Stadium, Lahore	29 November 2005
7th wicket	308	Waqar Hasan	Imtiaz Ahmed	New Zealand	Gaddafi Stadium, Lahore	26 October 1955
8th wicket	313	Wasim Akram	Saqlain Mushtaq	Zimbabwe	Sheikhupura Stadium, Sheikhupura	17 October 1996
9th wicket	190	Asif Iqbal	Intikhab Alam	England	Kenington Oval, London	24 August 1967
10th wicket	151	Azhar Mahmood	Mushtaq Ahmed	South Africa	Rawalpindi Cricket Stadium, Rawalpindi	6 October 1997
Last updated: 15 October 2017

=== Highest partnerships by runs ===
The highest Test partnership by runs for any wicket is held by the Sri Lankan pairing of Kumar Sangakkara and Mahela Jayawardene who put together a third wicket partnership of 624 runs during the first Test against South Africa in July 2006. This broke the record of 576 runs set by their compatriots Sanath Jayasuriya and Roshan Mahanama against India in 1997. New Zealand's Andrew Jones and Martin Crowe hold the third-highest Test partnership with 467 made in 1991 against Sri Lanka. Equal fourth on the list is Mudassar Nazar and Javed Miandad of Pakistan who together scored 451 against Pakistan in 1983 and the Australian pairing of Bill Ponsford and Don Bradman putting on the same score against England in the 1934 Ashes series.

Wicket	Runs	First batsman	Second batsman	Opposition	Venue	Date
3rd wicket	451	Mudassar Nazar	Javed Miandad	India	Niaz Stadium, Hyderabad, Sindh	14 January 1983
3rd wicket	397	Qasim Umar	Javed Miandad	Sri Lanka	Iqbal Stadium, Faisalabad	16 October 1985
3rd wicket	363	Younis Khan	Mohammad Yousuf	England	Headingley Cricket Ground, Leeds	4 August 2006
3rd wicket	352*	Ijaz Ahmed	Inzamam-ul-Haq	Sri Lanka	Bangabandhu National Stadium, Dhaka	12 March 1999
4th wicket	350	Mushtaq Mohammad	Asif Iqbal	New Zealand	Carisbrook, Dunedin	7 February 1973
Last updated: 16 October 2017

=== Highest overall partnership runs by a pair ===
Rank	Runs	Innings	Players	Highest	Average	100/50	Span
1	3,213	53	Misbah-ul-Haq & Younis Khan	218	68.36	15/7	2001-2017
2	3,137	42	Mohammad Yousuf & Younis Khan	363	78.42	9/12	2000-2009
3	3,013	57	Inzamam-ul-Haq & Mohammad Yousuf	259	56.84	10/13	1998-2007
4	2,628	48	Azhar Ali & Younis Khan	250	54.75	7/9	2010-2017
5	2,325	42	Majid Khan & Sadiq Mohammad	195	59.61	6/14	1972-1981
An asterisk (*) signifies an unbroken partnership (i.e. neither of the batsmen was dismissed before either the end of the allotted overs or the required score being reached). Last updated: 11 October 2022

== Umpiring records ==
=== Most matches umpired ===
An umpire in cricket is a person who officiates the match according to the laws of cricket. Two umpires adjudicate the match on the field, whilst a third umpire has access to video replays, and a fourth umpire looks after the match balls and other duties. The records below are only for on-field umpires.

Aleem Dar of Pakistan holds the record for the most Test matches umpired with 136. The current active Dar set the record in December 2019 overtaking Steve Bucknor from the West Indies mark of 128 matches. They are followed by South Africa's Rudi Koertzen who officiated in 108.

Rank	Matches	Umpire	Period
1	136	Aleem Dar†	2003–2021
2	49	Asad Rauf	2005–2013
3	34	Khizer Hayat	1980–1996
4	28	Mahboob Shah	1975–1997
5	22	Shujauddin Siddiqi	1955–1978
Last updated: 10 March 2021

== See also ==
- Cricket statistics
- List of Test cricket records
- List of Pakistan One Day International cricket records
