= Sri Lankan cricket team in Pakistan in 1981–82 =

International cricket tour

The Sri Lanka national cricket team toured Pakistan in February to March 1982 and played a three-match Test series against the Pakistan national cricket team. Pakistan won the Test series 2–0. Sri Lanka were captained by Bandula Warnapura and Pakistan by Javed Miandad. In addition, the teams played a three-match Limited Overs International (LOI) series which Pakistan won 2–1.

== Test series summary ==
=== First Test ===
5–10 March 1982
(5-day match)
Scorecard

Pakistan	v	Sri Lanka
396 (103.2 overs); Haroon Rasheed 153 (242); DS de Silva 4/102 (38 overs)		344 (112.4 overs); S Wettimuny 71 (131); Tahir Naqqash 3/83 (32 overs)
301/4d (90 overs); Saleem Malik 100* (191); DS de Silva 3/99 (26 overs)		149 (47.1 overs); A Ranatunga 33 (41); Iqbal Qasim 4/27 (15.1 overs)

Pakistan won by 204 runs
National Stadium, Karachi
Umpires: Amanullah Khan and Mahboob Shah

- Pakistan won the toss and elected to bat.
- 8 March was taken as a rest day.
- This was first ever Test match between Pakistan and Sri Lanka.
- Rashid Khan, Saleem Malik, Saleem Yousuf and Tahir Naqqash (all PAK), and JR Ratnayeke (SL) made their Test debuts.

=== Second Test ===
14–19 March 1982
(5-day match)
Scorecard

Sri Lanka	v	Pakistan
454 (155 overs); S Wettimuny 157 (330); Iqbal Qasim 6/141 (65 overs)		270 (92 overs); Ashraf Ali 58 (104); DS de Silva 4/103 (32 overs)
154/8d (63 overs); HM Goonatilleke 56 (156); Tauseef Ahmed 3/18 (14 overs)		186/7 (59 overs); Mohsin Khan 74 (106); DS de Silva 5/59 (18 overs)

Match drawn
Iqbal Stadium, Faisalabad
Umpires: Javed Akhtar and Khizer Hayat

- Sri Lanka won the toss and elected to bat.
- 17 March was taken as a rest day.
- Ashraf Ali (PAK) and AN Ranasinghe (SL) made their Test debuts.

=== Third Test ===
22–27 March 1982
(5-day match)
Scorecard

Sri Lanka	v	Pakistan
240 (76.3 overs); RL Dias 109 (179); Imran Khan 8/58 (29.3 overs)		500/7d (119 overs); Zaheer Abbas 134 (148); ALF de Mel 3/120 (28 overs)
158 (61.5 overs); S Wettimuny 41 (98); Imran Khan 6/58 (22.5 overs)

Pakistan won by an innings and 102 runs
Gaddafi Stadium, Lahore
Umpires: Khizer Hayat and Shakoor Rana

- Pakistan won the toss and elected to field.
- There was no play on the third day.
- The match was scheduled for five days but extended to six, by playing on the scheduled rest day.
- RSA Jayasekera and RGCE Wijesuriya (SL) made their Test debuts.

== One Day Internationals (ODIs) ==
Pakistan won the Wills Series 2-1.

=== 1st ODI ===
12 March 1982
Scorecard

Sri Lanka; 171/3 (33 overs)	v	Pakistan; 174/2 (29.2 overs)
B Warnapura 77 (98); Jalal-ud-Din 1/14 (5 overs)		Mohsin Khan 85 (91); JR Ratnayeke 1/40 (6.2 overs)

Pakistan won by 8 wickets
National Stadium, Karachi
Umpires: Shakeel Khan and Tariq Ata
Player of the match: Mohsin Khan (PAK)

- Pakistan won the toss and elected to field.
- Jalal-ud-Din and Saleem Yousuf (both PAK), and JR Ratnayeke and RGCE Wijesuriya (both SL) made their ODI debuts.

=== 2nd ODI ===
29 March 1982
Scorecard

Pakistan; 239/4 (40 overs)	v	Sri Lanka; 227/4 (33 overs)
Zaheer Abbas 123 (87); JR Ratnayeke 1/42 (8 overs)		RL Dias 81 (59); Mudassar Nazar 2/56 (8 overs)

Sri Lanka won by faster scoring rate
Gaddafi Stadium, Lahore
Umpires: Mian Mohammad Aslam and Rab Nawaz
Player of the match: RL Dias (SL)

- Sri Lanka won the toss and elected to field.
- When play was halted Sri Lanka needed to have scored 198 runs to win.

=== 3rd ODI ===
31 March 1982
Scorecard

Sri Lanka; 218 (38.3 overs)	v	Pakistan; 222/5 (38.1 overs)
RL Dias 49 (59); Imran Khan 2/10 (7 overs)		Mudassar Nazar 79 (82); GRA de Silva 3/41 (8 overs)

Pakistan won by 5 wickets
National Stadium, Karachi
Umpires: Ghafoor Butt and Shakeel Khan
Player of the match: Mudassar Nazar (PAK)

- Pakistan won the toss and elected to field.
- Tauseef Ahmed (PAK) made his ODI debut.
