= Sri Lankan cricket team in Pakistan in 1985–86 =

International cricket tour

The Sri Lanka national cricket team toured Pakistan in October to November 1985 and played a three-match Test series against the Pakistan national cricket team. Pakistan won the Test series 2–0. Sri Lanka were captained by Duleep Mendis and Pakistan by Javed Miandad. In addition, the teams played a four-match Limited Overs International (LOI) series which Pakistan won 4–0.

== Test series summary ==
=== 1st Test ===
16–21 October 1985
(5-day match)
Scorecard

Sri Lanka	v	Pakistan
479 (200.3 overs); PA de Silva 122; Imran Khan 3/112 (49 overs)		555/3 (162.5 overs); Qasim Umar 206; Javed Miandad 203*; RJ Ratnayake 2/93 (32 overs)

Match drawn
Iqbal Stadium, Faisalabad
Umpires: Khizer Hayat and Mahboob Shah
Player of the match: PA de Silva (SL)

- Sri Lanka won the toss and elected to bat.
- 19 October was taken as a rest day.

=== 2nd Test ===
27–31 October 1985
(5-day match)
Scorecard

Sri Lanka	v	Pakistan
157 (56.2 overs); S Wettimuny 45; Imran Khan 4/55 (19 overs)		259 (63.2 overs); Mudassar Nazar 78; JR Ratnayeke 8/83 (23.2 overs)
200 (62.3 overs); RS Madugalle 65; Imran Khan 5/40 (18.3 overs)		100/2 (23.4 overs); Mohsin Khan 44; ALF de Mel 1/43 (10 overs)

Pakistan won by 8 wickets
Jinnah Stadium, Sialkot
Umpires: Javed Akhtar and Mian Mohammad Aslam
Player of the match: JR Ratnayeke (SL)

- Pakistan won the toss and elected to field.
- 30 October was taken as a rest day.
- The match was scheduled for five days but completed in four.

=== 3rd Test ===
7–11 November 1985
(5-day match)
Scorecard

Sri Lanka	v	Pakistan
162 (76.5 overs); JR Ratnayeke 36; Abdul Qadir 5/44 (20.5 overs)		295 (75 overs); Javed Miandad 63; Imran Khan 63; ALF de Mel 6/109 (22 overs)
230 (80.2 overs); PA de Silva 105; Tauseef Ahmed 5/54 (23.2 overs)		98/0 (16.4 overs); Mudassar Nazar 57*

Pakistan won by 10 wickets
National Stadium, Karachi
Umpires: Khizer Hayat and Mahboob Shah
Player of the match: PA de Silva (SL)

- Sri Lanka won the toss and elected to bat.
- 10 November was taken as a rest day.
- The match was scheduled for five days but completed in four.
- AP Gurusinha (SL) made his Test debut.

== One Day Internationals (ODIs) ==
Pakistan won the Wills Series 4-0.

=== 1st ODI ===
13 October 1985
Scorecard

Sri Lanka; 145 (39.2 overs)	v	Pakistan; 147/2 (32.5 overs)
ALF de Mel 36* (34); Imran Khan 2/22 (8 overs)		Shoaib Mohammad 72* (149); RGCE Wijesuriya 1/18 (6 overs)

Pakistan won by 8 wickets
Shahi Bagh Stadium, Peshawar
Umpires: Javed Akhtar and Khizer Hayat
Player of the match: Mudassar Nazar (PAK)

- Pakistan won the toss and elected to field.

=== 2nd ODI ===
23 October 1985
Scorecard

Pakistan; 224/5 (40 overs)	v	Sri Lanka; 209/7 (40 overs)
Saleem Malik 72* (60); RJ Ratnayake 3/51 (8 overs)		PA de Silva 86 (92); Abdul Qadir 2/25 (8 overs)

Pakistan won by 15 runs
Municipal Stadium, Gujranwala
Umpires: Mian Mohammad Aslam and Shakoor Rana
Player of the match: PA de Silva (SRI)

- Sri Lanka won the toss and elected to field.

=== 3rd ODI ===
25 October 1985
Scorecard

Sri Lanka; 228/7 (38 overs)	v	Pakistan; 231/5 (36.3 overs)
RS Madugalle 73 (77); Tahir Naqqash 3/59 (8 overs)		Javed Miandad 91* (75); RJ Ratnayake 2/50 (6.3 overs)

Pakistan won by 5 wickets
Gaddafi Stadium, Lahore
Umpires: Amanullah Khan and Shakoor Rana
Player of the match: Javed Miandad (PAK)

- Pakistan won the toss and elected to field.
- The match was reduced before play started from 40 to 38 overs per side.
- FS Ahangama (SL) made his ODI debut.

=== 4th ODI ===
3 November 1985
Scorecard

Pakistan; 216/7 (39 overs)	v	Sri Lanka; 127 (37.2 overs)
Javed Miandad 56 (49); JR Ratnayeke 3/34 (6 overs)		LRD Mendis 46 (74); Abdul Qadir 2/13 (7.2 overs)

Pakistan won by 89 runs
Niaz Stadium, Hyderabad
Umpires: Feroze Butt and Shakeel Khan
Player of the match: Javed Miandad (PAK)

- Sri Lanka won the toss and elected to field.
- The match was reduced to 39 overs per side.
- AP Gurusinha (SL) made his ODI debut.
