= Indian cricket team in Pakistan in 1982–83 =

International cricket tour

Indians in Pakistan in 1982–83
	India	Pakistan
- Dates: 27 November 1982 – 4 February 1983
Captains	Sunil Gavaskar	Imran Khan

Test series
- Result: Pakistan won the 6-match series 3–0
Most runs	Mohinder Amarnath (584)	Mudassar Nazar (761)
Most wickets	Kapil Dev (24)	Imran Khan (40)

The India national cricket team toured the Pakistan during the 1982–83 cricket season. They played six Test matches against the Pakistan cricket team, with Pakistan winning the series 3–0.

== Test matches ==
=== 1st Test ===
10–15 December 1982
Scorecard

Pakistan	v	India
485 (143.5 overs); Zaheer Abbas 215 (254); Dilip Doshi 5/90 (32.5 overs)		379 (124.5 overs); Mohinder Amarnath 109* (284); Sarfraz Nawaz 4/63 (31.5 overs)
135/1 (46 overs); Mohsin Khan 101* (161); Dilip Doshi 1/57 (15 overs)

Match drawn
Gaddafi Stadium, Lahore
Umpires: Amanullah Khan (Pak) and Mahboob Shah (Pak)
Player of the match: Zaheer Abbas (Pak)

- India won the toss and decided to field
- 13 December was a rest day.
- Sunil Gavaskar (Ind) became the fifth batsman to pass 7,000 Test runs.

=== 2nd Test ===
23–27 December 1982
Scorecard

India	v	Pakistan
169 (53.1 overs); Kapil Dev 73 (53); Abdul Qadir 4/67 (15 overs)		452 (109.5 overs); Zaheer Abbas 186 (246); Kapil Dev 5/102 (28.5 overs)
197 (60.1 overs); Dilip Vengsarkar 79 (133); Imran Khan 8/60 (20.1 overs)

Pakistan won by an innings and 86 runs
National Stadium, Karachi
Umpires: Khizer Hayat (Pak) and Shakoor Rana (Pak)
Player of the match: Imran Khan (Pak)

- Pakistan won the toss and decided to field
- 26 December was a rest day.

=== 3rd Test ===
3–8 January 1983
Scorecard

India	v	Pakistan
372 (85.3 overs); Sandeep Patil 84 (99); Imran Khan 6/98 (25 overs)		652 (142.4 overs); Zaheer Abbas 168 (176); Kapil Dev 7/220 (38.4 overs)
286 (94.5 overs); Sunil Gavaskar 127* (262); Imran Khan 5/82 (30.5 overs)		10/0 (2.1 overs); Mohsin Khan 8* (7); Dilip Vengsarkar 0/4 (1 overs)

Pakistan won by 10 wickets
Iqbal Stadium, Faisalabad
Umpires: Mahboob Shah (Pak) and Shakeel Khan (Pak)
Player of the match: Imran Khan (Pak)

- Pakistan won the toss and decided to field
- Maninder Singh (Ind) made his Test debut, the youngest for India at the time.
- 6 January was a rest day.
- Zaheer Abbas became the first Pakistan batsman to score centuries in three successive innings.
- Imran Khan became the first Pakistan bowler to pick 200 wickets.

=== 4th Test ===
14–19 January 1983
Scorecard

Pakistan	v	India
581/3d (166 overs); Javed Miandad 280* (460); Balwinder Sandhu 2/107 (33 overs)		189 (56.2 overs); Balwinder Sandhu 71 (88); Imran Khan 6/35 (17.2 overs)
		273 (111.4 overs); Mohinder Amarnath 64 (210); Sarfraz Nawaz 4/85 (30 overs)

Pakistan won by an innings and 119 runs
Niaz Stadium, Hyderabad
Umpires: Javed Akhtar (Pak) and Khizer Hayat (Pak)
Player of the match: Javed Miandad (Pak)

- Pakistan won the toss and decided to bat
- 17 January was a rest day.
- Zaheer Abbas became the first Pakistan batsman to pass 4,000 runs in Tests.
- The partnership of Javed Miandad and Mudassar Nazar of 451 in the first innings equalled the record for highest partnership for any wicket.
- It was the first instance for Pakistan and fifth overall of two batsmen scoring double centuries in the same innings.

=== 5th Test ===
23–28 January 1983
Scorecard

Pakistan	v	India
323 (103.5 overs); Mudassar Nazar 152* (296); Kapil Dev 8/85 (30.5 overs)		235/3 (81.2 overs); Mohinder Amarnath 120 (200); Imran Khan 2/45 (18 overs)

Match drawn
Gaddafi Stadium, Lahore
Umpires: Javed Akhtar (Pak) and Khizer Hayat (Pak)
Player of the match: Kapil Dev (Ind)

- India won the toss and decided to field
- Rain prevented play on dayes four and five.
- T. A. Sekhar (Ind) made his Test debut.
- 26 January was a rest day.
- Gundappa Viswanath (Ind) beat the record held by Garfield Sobers for most consecutive tests played (86).

=== 6th Test ===
30 January–4 February 1983
Scorecard

India	v	Pakistan
393/8d (136 overs); Ravi Shastri 128 (327); Imran Khan 3/65 (32 overs)		420/6d (117.2 overs); Mudassar Nazar 152 (308); Balwinder Sandhu 2/87 (28.2 overs)
224/2 (68 overs); Mohinder Amarnath 103* (188); Imran Khan 2/41 (16 overs)

Match drawn
National Stadium, Karachi
Umpires: Javed Akhtar (Pak) and Khizer Hayat (Pak)
Player of the match: Mudassar Nazar (Pak)

- India won the toss and decided to bat
- 2 February was a rest day.
- Play on the afternoon of day four was abandoned due to politically motivated rioting, which included an attempt to damage the pitch.
- Wasim Bari became the fourth wicket-keeper to effect 200 dismissals.
- Mudassar Nazar's 761 runs in the series was the most by a Pakistan batsman, beating Hanif Mohammad's 628.
- Imran Khan's 40 wickets in the series was the most by any Pakistan bowler in a single Test series.

== One Day Internationals (ODIs) ==
Pakistan won the Wills Series 3–1.

=== 1st ODI ===
3 December 1982
Scorecard

Pakistan; 224/4 (40 overs)	v	India; 210/6 (40 overs)
Javed Miandad 106* (106); Madan Lal 2/39 (8 overs)		Yashpal Sharma 56* (52); Jalal-ud-Din 2/36 (8 overs)

Pakistan won by 14 runs
Municipal Stadium, Gujranwala
Umpires: Amanullah Khan and Shakeel Khan
Player of the match: Javed Miandad (PAK)

- India won the toss and elected to field.
- BS Sandhu (IND) made his ODI debut.

=== 2nd ODI ===
17 December 1982
Scorecard

Pakistan; 263/2 (40 overs)	v	India; 226/7 (40 overs)
Zaheer Abbas 118 (86); Kapil Dev 1/42 (8 overs)		SM Patil 84 (60); Jalal-ud-Din 2/21 (4 overs)

Pakistan won by 37 runs
Ibn-e-Qasim Bagh Stadium, Multan
Umpires: Khizer Hayat and Shakoor Rana
Player of the match: Zaheer Abbas (PAK)

- Pakistan won the toss and elected to bat.

=== 3rd ODI ===
31 December 1982
Scorecard

Pakistan; 252/3 (33 overs)	v	India; 193/4 (27 overs)
Javed Miandad 119* (77); RJ Shastri 1/39 (7 overs)		SM Gavaskar 69 (76); Mudassar Nazar 2/13 (2 overs)

India won by 18 runs
Gaddafi Stadium, Lahore
Umpires: Khizer Hayat and Shakoor Rana
Player of the match: Javed Miandad (PAK)

- Pakistan won the toss and elected to bat.
- The match was reduced before play started to 33 overs per side.
- When play was halted India needed to have scored 176 runs to win. Pakistan were 175/2 after 27 overs.
- Shahid Mahboob (PAK) made his ODI debut.

=== 4th ODI ===
21 January 1983
Scorecard

India; 197/6 (40 overs)	v	Pakistan; 198/2 (35 overs)
K Srikkanth 48 (76); Sarfraz Nawaz 3/31 (8 overs)		Zaheer Abbas 113 (99); BS Sandhu 2/38 (7 overs)

Pakistan won by 8 wickets
National Stadium, Karachi
Umpires: Khizer Hayat and Mahboob Shah
Player of the match: Zaheer Abbas (PAK)

- India won the toss and elected to bat.
- TA Sekhar and Maninder Singh (both IND) made their ODI debuts.
