= New Zealand cricket team in Pakistan in 1990–91 =

International cricket tour

The New Zealand national cricket team toured Pakistan in October to November 1990 and played a three-match Test series against the Pakistan national cricket team. Pakistan won the Test series 3–0. In addition, the teams played a three-match Limited Overs International (LOI) series which Pakistan won 3–0. New Zealand were captained by Martin Crowe and Pakistan by Javed Miandad.

== Test series summary ==
=== 1st Test ===
10–15 October 1990
(5-day match)
Scorecard

New Zealand	v	Pakistan
196 (84.5 overs); KR Rutherford 79 (141); Waqar Younis 4/40 (22 overs)		433/6d (140.3 overs); Shoaib Mohammad 203 (411); DK Morrison 2/86 (28.3 overs)
194 (62.4 overs); MD Crowe 68* (143); Wasim Akram 4/60 (24 overs)

Pakistan won by an innings and 43 runs
National Stadium, Karachi
Umpires: Feroze Butt and Mahboob Shah
Player of the match: Shoaib Mohammad (PAK)

- Pakistan won the toss and elected to field.
- 13 October was taken as a rest day.
- GE Bradburn, C Pringle and DJ White (all NZ) made their Test debuts.

=== 2nd Test ===
18–23 October 1990
(5-day match)
Scorecard

New Zealand	v	Pakistan
160 (59 overs); IDS Smith 33 (41); Waqar Younis 3/20 (15 overs)		373/9d (125 overs); Shoaib Mohammad 105 (223); W Watson 6/78 (36 overs)
287 (115.5 overs); MD Crowe 108* (306); Waqar Younis 7/86 (37.5 overs)		77/1 (20.3 overs); Shoaib Mohammad 42* (59); DK Morrison 1/36 (8 overs)

Pakistan won by 9 wickets
Gaddafi Stadium, Lahore
Umpires: Athar Zaidi and Saleem Badar
Player of the match: Waqar Younis (PAK)

- New Zealand won the toss and elected to bat.
- 21 October was taken as a rest day.

=== 3rd Test ===
26–31 October 1990
(5-day match)
Scorecard

Pakistan	v	New Zealand
102 (40.3 overs); Javed Miandad 25 (54); C Pringle 7/52 (16 overs)		217 (76.2 overs); IDS Smith 61 (42); Waqar Younis 7/76 (30.2 overs)
357 (139.5 overs); Shoaib Mohammad 142 (368); C Pringle 4/100 (43 overs)		177 (58.5 overs); DN Patel 45 (105); Waqar Younis 5/54 (23.5 overs)

Pakistan won by 65 runs
Iqbal Stadium, Faisalabad
Umpires: Athar Zaidi and Saleem Badar
Player of the match: Waqar Younis (PAK)

- New Zealand won the toss and elected to field.
- 27 October was taken as a rest day.
- Chris Pringle admitted tampering with the ball during this match - he only took 19 wickets at an average of 65 in the other 13 Tests he played.

== One Day Internationals (ODIs) ==
Pakistan won the series 3-0.

=== 1st ODI ===
2 November 1990
Scorecard

Pakistan; 196/8 (40 overs)	v	New Zealand; 177 (39.2 overs)
Saeed Anwar 101 (115); DK Morrison 3/28 (8 overs)		IDS Smith 47 (31); Saleem Malik 5/35 (7 overs)

Pakistan won by 19 runs
Gaddafi Stadium, Lahore
Umpires: Khizer Hayat and Mian Mohammad Aslam
Player of the match: Saeed Anwar (PAK)

- New Zealand won the toss and elected to field.
- DJ White (NZ) made his ODI debut.

=== 2nd ODI ===
4 November 1990
Scorecard

New Zealand; 127 (37.4 overs)	v	Pakistan; 128/2 (29.1 overs)
MD Crowe 46 (55); Waqar Younis 5/11 (6.4 overs)		Saeed Anwar 67 (75); GE Bradburn 2/18 (6 overs)

Pakistan won by 8 wickets
Arbab Niaz Stadium, Peshawar
Umpires: Javed Akhtar and Said Shah
Player of the match: Saeed Anwar (PAK)

- New Zealand won the toss and elected to bat.
- GE Bradburn (NZ) made his ODI debut.

=== 3rd ODI ===
6 November 1990
Scorecard

Pakistan; 223/2 (40 overs)	v	New Zealand; 118 (25 overs)
Rameez Raja 114 (123); DN Patel 1/44 (7 overs)		KR Rutherford 24 (24); Waqar Younis 5/16 (6 overs)

Pakistan won by 105 runs
Jinnah Stadium, Sialkot
Umpires: Khalid Aziz and Shakeel Khan
Player of the match: Rameez Raja (PAK)

- New Zealand won the toss and elected to field.
- Zahid Fazal (PAK) made his ODI debut.
