= West Indian cricket team in Pakistan in 1986–87 =

International cricket tour

The West Indies cricket team toured Pakistan in October to November 1986 and played a three-match Test series against the Pakistan national cricket team. The Test series was drawn 1–1. West Indies were captained by Viv Richards and Pakistan by Imran Khan. In addition, the teams played a five-match Limited Overs International (LOI) series which West Indies won 4–1.

== Test series summary ==
=== First Test ===
24–29 October 1986
(5-day match)
Scorecard

Pakistan	v	West Indies
159 (38.5 overs); Imran Khan 61 (75); AH Gray 4/39 (11.5 overs)		248 (83 overs); RB Richardson 54 (124); Wasim Akram 6/91 (25 overs)
328 (117.5 overs); Wasim Akram 66 (82); CA Walsh 3/49 (23 overs)		53 (25.3 overs); RB Richardson 14 (54); Abdul Qadir 6/16 (9.3 overs)

Pakistan won by 186 runs
Iqbal Stadium, Faisalabad
Umpires: Khizer Hayat (PAK) and Mian Mohammad Aslam (PAK)
Player of the match: Wasim Akram (PAK)

- Pakistan won the toss and elected to bat.
- 25 October was taken as a rest day.
- AH Gray (WIN) made his Test debut.

=== Second Test ===
7–9 November 1986
(5-day match)
Scorecard

Pakistan	v	West Indies
131 (53.4 overs); Javed Miandad 46 (114); MD Marshall 5/33 (18 overs)		218 (90.5 overs); CG Greenidge 75 (191); Imran Khan 5/59 (30.5 overs)
77 (44.5 overs); Javed Miandad 19 (73); CA Walsh 4/21 (14.5 overs)

West Indies won by an innings and 10 runs
Gaddafi Stadium, Lahore
Umpires: VK Ramaswamy (IND) and PD Reporter (IND)
Player of the match: MD Marshall (WIN)

- Pakistan won the toss and elected to bat.
- The match was scheduled for five days but completed in three.
- Asif Mujtaba (PAK) made his Test debut.

=== Third Test ===
20–25 November 1986
(5-day match)
Scorecard

West Indies	v	Pakistan
240 (86.5 overs); IVA Richards 70 (100); Abdul Qadir 4/107 (31.5 overs)		239 (110.1 overs); Javed Miandad 76 (112); CG Butts 4/73 (38 overs)
211 (95.3 overs); DL Haynes 88* (289); Imran Khan 6/46 (22.3 overs)		125/7 (78 overs); Rameez Raja 29 (162); MD Marshall 3/31 (19 overs)

Match drawn
National Stadium, Karachi
Umpires: VK Ramaswamy (IND) and PD Reporter (IND)
Player of the match: Imran Khan (PAK)

- West Indies won the toss and elected to bat.
- 23 November was taken as a rest day.
- Saleem Jaffar (PAK) made his Test debut.

== One Day Internationals (ODIs) ==
West Indies won the Wills Series 4-1.

=== 1st ODI ===
17 October 1986
Scorecard

Pakistan; 164/7 (49 overs)	v	West Indies; 165/6 (45.3 overs)
Abdul Qadir 34 (45); AH Gray 3/20 (10 overs)		CG Greenidge 67 (104); Imran Khan 1/22 (7.3 overs)

West Indies won by 4 wickets
Shahi Bagh Stadium, Peshawar
Umpires: Athar Zaidi and Shakoor Rana
Player of the match: CG Greenidge (WIN)

- Pakistan won the toss and elected to bat.
- The match was reduced to 49 overs per side.
- Saleem Jaffar (PAK) and WKM Benjamin (WIN) made their ODI debuts.

=== 2nd ODI ===
4 November 1986
Scorecard

West Indies; 196/7 (50 overs)	v	Pakistan; 155/6 (43.5 overs)
MD Marshall 66 (78); Saleem Jaffar 3/49 (10 overs)		Javed Miandad 74 (109); WKM Benjamin 3/21 (10 overs)

West Indies won on run rate (with maiden overs ignored)
Municipal Stadium, Gujranwala
Umpires: Khizer Hayat and Tariq Ata
Player of the match: MD Marshall (WIN)

- Pakistan won the toss and elected to field.
- Asif Mujtaba (PAK) made his ODI debut.

=== 3rd ODI ===
14 November 1986
Scorecard

Pakistan; 148/7 (45 overs)	v	West Indies; 151/6 (44.3 overs)
Javed Miandad 34 (76); CA Walsh 3/38 (9 overs)		DL Haynes 38 (89); PJL Dujon 38 (39); Saleem Jaffar 2/29 (8 overs)

West Indies won by 4 wickets
Jinnah Stadium, Sialkot
Umpires: Amanullah Khan and Shakeel Khan
Player of the match: PJL Dujon (WIN)

- Pakistan won the toss and elected to bat.
- The match was reduced before play started to 45 overs per side.
- Ijaz Ahmed (PAK) made his ODI debut.

=== 4th ODI ===
17 November 1986
Scorecard

West Indies; 202/5 (44 overs)	v	Pakistan; 113 (38.2 overs)
AL Logie 46 (63); Tauseef Ahmed 2/29 (9 overs)		Javed Miandad 30 (76); AH Gray 4/36 (9 overs)

West Indies won by 89 runs
Ibn-e-Qasim Bagh Stadium, Multan
Umpires: Mahboob Shah and Shakoor Rana
Player of the match: AH Gray (WIN)

- Pakistan won the toss and elected to field.
- The match was reduced to 44 overs per side.

=== 5th ODI ===
18 November 1986
Scorecard

Pakistan; 202/6 (45 overs)	v	West Indies; 191/7 (45 overs)
Rameez Raja 32 (67); RB Richardson 1/4 (1 over)		RB Richardson 70 (116); Imran Khan 2/37 (9 overs); Saleem Jaffar 2/37 (9 overs)

Pakistan won by 11 runs
Niaz Stadium, Hyderabad
Umpires: Masroor Ali and Shakeel Khan
Player of the match: Imran Khan (PAK)

- West Indies won the toss and elected to field.
