= English cricket team in Pakistan in 1983–84 =

International cricket tour

The England national cricket team toured Pakistan in March 1984 and played a three-match Test series against the Pakistan national cricket team. Pakistan won the Test series 1–0. England were captained by Bob Willis and Pakistan by Zaheer Abbas. In addition, the teams played a two-match Limited Overs International (LOI) series which was drawn 1–1. The third Test of the series, at Lahore, was the 600th Test match to be played by England.

== Test series summary ==
=== First Test ===
2–6 March 1984
(5-day match)
Scorecard

England	v	Pakistan
182 (94.5 overs); DI Gower 58 (145); Abdul Qadir 5/74 (31 overs)		277 (102 overs); Saleem Malik 74 (156); NGB Cook 6/65 (30 overs)
159 (78.3 overs); DI Gower 57 (151); Tauseef Ahmed 3/37 (21 overs)		66/7 (30.3 overs); Anil Dalpat 16* (28); NGB Cook 5/18 (14 overs)

Pakistan won by 3 wickets
National Stadium, Karachi
Umpires: Khizer Hayat and Shakoor Rana
Player of the match: Abdul Qadir (PAK)

- England won the toss and elected to bat.
- 5 March was taken as a rest day.
- The match was scheduled for five days but completed in four.
- Anil Dalpat and Rameez Raja (both PAK) made their Test debuts.

=== Second Test ===
12–17 March 1984
(5-day match)
Scorecard

Pakistan	v	England
449/8d (142 overs); Saleem Malik 116 (270); GR Dilley 3/101 (28 overs)		546/8d (189 overs); DI Gower 152 (318); Sarfraz Nawaz 3/129 (50 overs)
137/4 (41 overs); Saleem Malik 76 (95); GR Dilley 2/41 (9 overs)

Match drawn
Iqbal Stadium, Faisalabad
Umpires: Javed Akhtar and Mahboob Shah
Player of the match: DI Gower (ENG)

- Pakistan won the toss and elected to bat.
- 15 March was taken as a rest day.

=== Third Test ===
19–24 March 1984
(5-day match)
Scorecard

England	v	Pakistan
241 (78.5 overs); VJ Marks 74 (136); Abdul Qadir 5/84 (30 overs)		343 (128 overs); Sarfraz Nawaz 90 (160); NA Foster 5/67 (32 overs)
344/9d (107.4 overs); DI Gower 173* (284); Abdul Qadir 5/110 (42 overs)		217/6 (58.3 overs); Mohsin Khan 104 (136); NG Cowans 5/42 (14 overs)

Match drawn
Gaddafi Stadium, Lahore
Umpires: Amanullah Khan and Khizer Hayat
Player of the match: Sarfraz Nawaz (PAK)

- Pakistan won the toss and elected to field.
- 22 March was taken as a rest day.
- Mohsin Kamal (PAK) made his Test debut.

== One Day Internationals (ODIs) ==
The Wills Series was drawn 1-1.

=== 1st ODI ===
9 March 1984
Scorecard

England; 184/8 (40 overs)	v	Pakistan; 187/4 (38.4 overs)
AJ Lamb 57 (78); Sarfraz Nawaz 3/33 (8 overs)		Zaheer Abbas 59* (37); RGD Willis 1/25 (7.4 overs)

Pakistan won by 6 wickets
Gaddafi Stadium, Lahore
Umpires: Amanullah Khan and Shakeel Khan
Player of the match: Zaheer Abbas (PAK)

- Pakistan won the toss and elected to field.
- Saadat Ali (PAK) made his ODI debut.

=== 2nd ODI ===
26 March 1984
Scorecard

Pakistan; 163/8 (40 overs)	v	England; 164/4 (38.4 overs)
Saadat Ali 78* (119); MW Gatting 3/32 (8 overs)		MW Gatting 38* (49); Mudassar Nazar 2/22 (8 overs)

England won by 6 wickets
National Stadium, Karachi
Umpires: Mahboob Shah and Shakeel Khan
Player of the match: MW Gatting (ENG)

- England won the toss and elected to field.
- NGB Cook (ENG), and Anil Dalpat and Naved Anjum (both PAK) made their ODI debuts.
