= West Indian cricket team against Pakistan in the UAE in 2001–02 =

	Pakistan	West Indies
- Dates: 31 January 2002 – 17 February 2002
Captains	Waqar Younis	Carl Hooper

Test series
- Result: Pakistan won the 2-match series 2–0
Most runs	Younis Khan 309	Carl Hooper 154
Most wickets	Shoaib Akhtar 10	Mervyn Dillon 10
- Player of the series: Abdul Razzaq (Pak) and Mervyn Dillon (WI)

One Day International series
- Results: Pakistan won the 3-match series 2–1
Most runs	Shoaib Malik 148	Carl Hooper 164
Most wickets	Abdul Razzaq 5	Chris Gayle; Carl Hooper 4
- Player of the series: Abdul Razzaq (Pak)

The West Indies cricket team toured UAE to play cricket series against Pakistan in the 2001–02 cricket season. The series was originally scheduled to take place in Pakistan, but was moved to the United Arab Emirates, following the 9/11 attacks in the United States.

== Squads ==
Pakistan	West Indies
Waqar Younis (c); Abdul Razzaq; Danish Kaneria; Faisal Iqbal; Inzamam-ul-Haq; Mohammad Sami; Mohammad Yousuf; Mohammad Zahid; Naved Latif; Rashid Latif (wk); Saqlain Mushtaq; Shahid Afridi; Shoaib Akhtar; Shoaib Malik; Taufeeq Umar; Younis Khan; Wasim Akram	Carl Hooper (c); Darryl Brown; Sherwin Campbell; Shivnarine Chanderpaul; Pedro Collins; Corey Collymore; Cameron Cuffy; Mervyn Dillon; Daren Ganga; Chris Gayle; Ryan Hinds; Wavell Hinds; Ridley Jacobs (wk); Dinanath Ramnarine; Marlon Samuels

== Test series ==
=== 1st Test ===
31 January–4 February 2002
Scorecard

Pakistan	v	West Indies
493 (161.5 overs); Rashid Latif 150 (234); Chris Gayle 3/27 (7.5 overs)		366 (125.3 overs); Chris Gayle 68 (117); Waqar Younis 4/93 (25.3 overs)
214/6d (57.4 overs); Inzamam-ul-Haq 48 (56); Mervyn Dillon 2/46 (17 overs)		171 (62.5 overs); Chris Gayle 66 (118); Shoaib Akhtar 5/24 (16 overs)

Pakistan won by 170 runs
Sharjah Cricket Stadium, Sharjah
Umpires: Riazuddin (Pak) and George Sharp (Eng)
Player of the match: Shoaib Akhtar (Pak)

- Pakistan won the toss and elected to bat.
- Naved Latif (Pak) and Ryan Hinds (WIN) made their test debuts.

=== 2nd Test ===
7–10 February 2002
Scorecard

Pakistan	v	West Indies
472 (135 overs); Younis Khan 153 (291); Cameron Cuffy 4/82 (29 overs)		264 (84.5 overs); Carl Hooper 84* (182); Shoaib Akhtar 4/63 (18 overs)
225/5d (76 overs); Younis Khan 71 (167); Mervyn Dillon 3/57 (18 overs)		171 (61 overs); Ryan Hinds 46 (55); Waqar Younis 4/44 (10 overs)

Pakistan won by 244 runs
Sharjah Cricket Stadium, Sharjah
Umpires: Shakeel Khan (Pak) and Darrell Hair (Aus)
Player of the match: Younis Khan (Pak)

- West Indies won the toss and elected to field.

== ODI series ==
=== 1st ODI ===
14 February 2002 (D/N)
Scorecard

West Indies; 190 (48.3 overs)	v	Pakistan; 193/6 (46.1 overs)
Chris Gayle 50 (53); Abdul Razzaq 2/24 (7 overs)		Rashid Latif 47 (58); Carl Hooper 2/44 (10 overs)

Pakistan won by 4 wickets
Sharjah Cricket Stadium, Sharjah
Umpires: Aleem Dar (Pak) and Mohammad Aslam (Pak)
Player of the match: Abdul Razzaq

- West Indies won the toss and chose to bat.
- Rashid Latif reached 1000 runs in ODIs.

=== 2nd ODI ===
15 February 2002 (D/N)
Scorecard

Pakistan; 232 (49 overs)	v	West Indies; 181 (34.4 overs)
Shoaib Malik 111* (130); Ryan Hinds 2/32 (6 overs)		Chris Gayle 62 (46); Mohammad Sami 4/44 (7.4 overs)

Pakistan won by 51 runs
Sharjah Cricket Stadium, Sharjah
Umpires: Asad Rauf (Pak) and Saleem Badar (Pak)
Player of the match: Shoaib Malik

- Pakistan won the toss and chose to bat.
- Runako Morton (WI) made his ODI debut.
- Mohammad Sami took a hat-trick with the wickets of Jacobs, Collymore and Cuffy.

=== 3rd ODI ===
17 February 2002 (D/N)
Scorecard

West Indies; 260/5 (50 overs)	v	Pakistan; 150 (40.2 overs)
Carl Hooper 112* (127); Waqar Younis 2/47 (10 overs)		Rashid Latif 37 (42); Chris Gayle 4/19 (4.2 overs)

West Indies won by 110 runs.
Sharjah Cricket Stadium, Sharjah
Umpires: Nadeem Ghauri (Pak) and Saleem Badar (Pak)
Player of the match: Carl Hooper (WI)

- West Indies won the toss and chose to bat.
- Pakistan were fined 1 over for slow over rate
