= Zimbabwean cricket team in Pakistan in 1993–94 =

International cricket tour

The Zimbabwe national cricket team toured Pakistan from November to December 1993, playing three Tests matches in Karachi, Rawalpindi and Lahore, as well as three One Day Internationals (ODI) at the same venues. Throughout the tour, Zimbabwe was captained by Andy Flower while for Pakistan it was Waqar Younis.

Prior to the tour, Zimbabwe played a tour match against the Bank of Khyber XI, which ended in a draw. In the Test series, Pakistan won the first two Tests by 131 and 52 runs respectively, securing the series 2–0, with the third Test ending in a draw. Zimbabwean batsman Alistair Campbell was the leading run-scorer of the series with 205 runs, while Pakistani bowler Waqar Younis was the leading wicket-taker with 27 wickets.

Following the Test series, the teams played three ODIs at the same venues. Pakistan won the matches by 7 wickets, 6 wickets, and 75 runs respectively.

== Test series summary ==
=== 1st Test ===
1–6 December 1993
(5-day match)
Scorecard

Pakistan	v	Zimbabwe
423/8d (155 overs); Shoaib Mohammad 81 (218); EA Brandes 3/106 (35 overs)		289 (116.1 overs); A Flower 63 (147); Waqar Younis 7/91 (34.1 overs)
131/3d (26 overs); Inzamam-ul-Haq 57* (76); EA Brandes 1/59 (13 overs)		134 (62.5 overs); GW Flower 25 (87); Waqar Younis 6/44 (21.5 overs)

Pakistan won by 131 runs
Defence Housing Authority Stadium, Karachi
Umpires: Mahboob Shah (PAK) and Shakeel Khan (PAK)
Player of the match: Waqar Younis (PAK)

- Pakistan won the toss and elected to bat.
- 4 December was taken as a rest day.
- GK Bruk-Jackson, MH Dekker, SG Peall, JA Rennie, HH Streak and GJ Whittall (all ZIM) made their Test debuts.

=== 2nd Test ===
9–14 December 1993
(5-day match)
Scorecard

Pakistan	v	Zimbabwe
245 (110.2 overs); Asif Mujtaba 54* (222); DH Brain 4/41 (32 overs)		254 (74 overs); MH Dekker 68 (160); Waqar Younis 5/88 (19 overs)
248 (101.3 overs); Rashid Latif 61 (111); HH Streak 5/56 (20.3 overs)		187 (62.2 overs); ADR Campbell 75 (144); Wasim Akram 5/65 (23.2 overs)

Pakistan won by 52 runs
Rawalpindi Cricket Stadium, Rawalpindi
Umpires: Javed Akhtar (PAK) and Shakoor Rana (PAK)
Player of the match: Waqar Younis (PAK)

- Zimbabwe won the toss and elected to field.
- 12 December was taken as a rest day.
- Ashfaq Ahmed (PAK) made his Test debut.

=== 3rd Test ===
16–21 December 1993
(5-day match)
Scorecard

Pakistan	v	Zimbabwe
147 (51.4 overs); Inzamam-ul-Haq 33 (54); DH Brain 5/42 (15 overs)		230 (84.4 overs); A Flower 62* (150); Waqar Younis 5/100 (34.4 overs)
174/1 (82 overs); Asif Mujtaba 65* (162); DH Brain 1/28 (14 overs)

Match drawn
Gaddafi Stadium, Lahore
Umpires: Athar Zaidi (PAK) and Khizer Hayat (PAK)
Player of the match: DH Brain (ZIM)

- Zimbabwe won the toss and elected to field.
- 19 December was taken as a rest day.
- WR James (ZIM) made his Test debut.

== One Day Internationals (ODIs) ==
=== 1st ODI ===
24 December 1993
Scorecard

Zimbabwe; 143 (38 overs)	v	Pakistan; 147/3 (33.5 overs)
DL Houghton 52 (75); Wasim Akram 5/15 (7 overs)		Saeed Anwar 68 (84); HH Streak 2/15 (8 overs)

Pakistan won by 7 wickets
National Stadium, Karachi
Umpires: Amanullah Khan and Feroze Butt
Player of the match: Wasim Akram (PAK)

- Pakistan won the toss and elected to field.

=== 2nd ODI ===
25 December 1993
Scorecard

Zimbabwe; 195/5 (40 overs)	v	Pakistan; 196/4 (39.4 overs)
ADR Campbell 74 (106); Wasim Akram 2/32 (8 overs)		Asif Mujtaba 61 (102); MH Dekker 2/16 (4 overs)

Pakistan won by 6 wickets
Rawalpindi Cricket Stadium, Rawalpindi
Umpires: Khalid Aziz and Siddiq Khan
Player of the match: Asif Mujtaba (PAK)

- Pakistan won the toss and elected to field.

=== 3rd ODI ===
27 December 1993
Scorecard

Pakistan; 216/4 (40 overs)	v	Zimbabwe; 141/9 (40 overs)
Inzamam-ul-Haq 80* (94); HH Streak 2/32 (8 overs)		Extras 27; ADR Campbell 26 (50); Mushtaq Ahmed 3/19 (8 overs)

Pakistan won by 75 runs
Gaddafi Stadium, Lahore
Umpires: Iftikhar Malik and Ikram Rabbani
Player of the match: Inzamam-ul-Haq (PAK)

- Pakistan won the toss and elected to bat.
- Irfan Bhatti (PAK) and GK Bruk-Jackson (ZIM) made their ODI debuts.
