= South African cricket team in Pakistan in 2003–04 =

International cricket tour

	South Africa	Pakistan
- Dates: 3 – 28 October 2003
Captains	Graeme Smith	Mohammad Yousuf (Tests); Inzamam-ul-Haq (ODIs)

Test series
- Result: Pakistan won the 2-match series 1–0
Most runs	Gary Kirsten (271)	Taufeeq Umar (313)
Most wickets	Paul Adams (10)	Danish Kaneria (11)
- Player of the series: Taufeeq Umar (Pak)

One Day International series
- Results: South Africa won the 5-match series 3–2
Most runs	Boeta Dippenaar (256)	Mohammad Yousuf (211)
Most wickets	Makhaya Ntini (12)	Shoaib Akhtar (8)
- Player of the series: Boeta Dippenaar (SA)

The South African cricket team toured Pakistan for the first time in October 2003. They played against the Pakistan national team in a five-match One Day International (ODI) series and a two-match Test series. South Africa won the ODI series 3–2. Pakistan then won the first Test, before the second finished as a draw, giving Pakistan victory in the series.

== ODI series ==
=== 1st ODI ===
3 October 2003

Pakistan; 277/6 (50 overs)	v	South Africa; 269/6(50 overs)
Shoaib Malik 82* (41); Jacques Kallis 2/53 (10 overs)		Boeta Dippenaar 110* (131); Shoaib Akhtar 3/49 (10 overs)

Pakistan won by 8 runs
Gaddafi Stadium, Lahore
Umpires: Aleem Dar (Pak) and Darrell Hair (Aus)
Player of the match: Shoaib Malik (Pak)

- Pakistan won the toss and elected to bat.

=== 2nd ODI ===
5 October 2003

Pakistan; 267/7 (50 overs)	v	South Africa; 225/9 (50 overs)
Mohammad Yousuf 65 (72); Makhaya Ntini 4/46 (10 overs)		Boeta Dippenaar 98 (76); Mohammad Sami 3/20 (8 overs)

Pakistan won by 42 runs
Gaddafi Stadium, Lahore
Umpires: Darrell Hair (Aus) and Nadeem Ghauri (Pak)
Player of the match: Mohammad Sami (Pak)

- South Africa won the toss and elected to field.
- Inzamam-ul-Haq (Pak) retired hurt on 9* from 56/2 to 225/6.

=== 3rd ODI ===
7 October 2003
Scorecard

Pakistan; 243/8 (50 overs)	v	South Africa; 221/6 (45 overs)
Yasir Hameed 72 (105); Makhaya Ntini 3/45 (9 overs)		Jacques Kallis 62 (80); Shoaib Akhtar 3/31 (8 overs)

South Africa won by 13 runs (D/L method)
Iqbal Stadium, Faisalabad
Umpires: Darrell Hair (Aus) and Nadeem Ghauri (Pak)
Player of the match: Jacques Kallis (SA)

- Pakistan won the toss and elected to bat.

=== 4th ODI ===
10 October 2003
Scorecard

Pakistan; 157 (47.4 overs)	v	South Africa; 158/4 (38.5 overs)
Mohammad Yousuf 60 (75); André Nel 4/39 (10 overs)		Jacques Kallis 58* (87); Shoaib Akhtar 1/23 (7 overs)

South Africa won by 6 wickets
Rawalpindi Cricket Stadium, Rawalpindi
Umpires: Aleem Dar (Pak) and Darrell Hair (Aus)
Player of the match: André Nel (SA)

- Pakistan won the toss and elected to bat.

=== 5th ODI ===
12 October 2003
Scorecard

Pakistan; 192 (49.3 overs)	v	South Africa; 193/3 (45.5 overs)
Abdul Razzaq 38 (51); Shaun Pollock 3/33 (9.3 overs)		Boeta Dippenaar 74 (125); Mohammad Sami 2/47 (10 overs)

South Africa won by 7 wickets
Rawalpindi Cricket Stadium, Rawalpindi
Umpires: Aleem Dar (Pak) and Darrell Hair (Aus)
Player of the match: Boeta Dippenaar (SA)

- Pakistan won the toss and elected to bat.

== Test series ==
=== 1st Test ===
17–21 October 2003
Scorecard

South Africa	v	Pakistan
320 (83 overs); Mark Boucher 72 (96); Shoaib Malik 4/42 (17 overs)		401 (148 overs); Taufeeq Umar 111 (247); Paul Adams 7/128 (45 overs)
241 (84.3 overs); Herschelle Gibbs 59 (123); Danish Kaneria 5/46 (28.3 overs)		164/2 (40.1 overs); Taufeeq Umar 63 (114); Graeme Smith 1/13 (5.1 overs)

Pakistan won by 8 wickets
Gaddafi Stadium, Lahore
Umpires: Darrell Hair (Aus) and Neil Mallender (Eng)
Player of the match: Danish Kaneria (Pak) and Taufeeq Umar (Pak)

- South Africa won the toss and elected to bat.
- Asim Kamal (Pak) made his Test debut.

=== 2nd Test ===
24–28 October 2003
Scorecard

South Africa	v	Pakistan
278 (99.1 overs); Herschelle Gibbs 98 (219); Shabbir Ahmed 4/74 (26 overs)		348 (116.2 overs); Imran Farhat 128 (226); Shaun Pollock 6/78 (29.2 overs)
371/8d (127.3 overs); Gary Kirsten 118 (232); Abdul Razzaq 3/70 (18 overs)		242/6 (98 overs); Taufeeq Umar 71 (183); Makhaya Ntini 2/45 (20 overs)

Match drawn
Iqbal Stadium, Faisalabad
Umpires: Daryl Harper (Aus) and Simon Taufel (Aus)
Player of the match: Gary Kirsten (SA) and Taufeeq Umar (Pak)

- South Africa won the toss and elected to bat.
