= Pakistani cricket team in Zimbabwe in 2002–03 =

International cricket tour

The Pakistani national cricket team visited Zimbabwe in November 2002 and played a two-match Test series against the Zimbabwean national cricket team. Pakistan won the Test series 2–0. Pakistan were captained by Waqar Younis and Zimbabwe by Alistair Campbell.

== Test series summary ==
=== 1st Test ===
9–12 November 2002
Scorecard

Pakistan	v	Zimbabwe
285 (89.5 overs); Taufeeq Umar 75 (121); AM Blignaut 5/79 (21 overs)		225 (66.5 overs); T Taibu 51* (118); Mohammad Sami 4/53 (19 overs)
369 (78.5 overs); Inzamam-ul-Haq 112 (107); HK Olonga 5/93 (17.5 overs)		310 (81.3 overs); DD Ebrahim 69 (116); GW Flower 69 (113); Shoaib Akhtar 4/75 (18.3 overs)

Pakistan won by 119 runs
Harare Sports Club, Harare
Umpires: DL Orchard (SA) and S Venkataraghavan (IND)
Player of the match: Taufeeq Umar (PAK)

- Zimbabwe won the toss and elected to field.
- The match was scheduled for five days but completed in four.
- Kamran Akmal (PAK) and NB Mahwire (ZIM) made their Test debuts.

=== 2nd Test ===
16–19 November 2002
Scorecard

Zimbabwe	v	Pakistan
178 (71.5 overs); GW Flower 54 (140); Saqlain Mushtaq 7/66 (25.5 overs)		403 (131.3 overs); Mohammad Yousuf 159 (282); RW Price 4/116 (51.3 overs)
281 (91.2 overs); ADR Campbell 62 (159); Waqar Younis 4/78 (21.2 overs)		57/0 (8.3 overs); Saleem Elahi 30* (25)

Pakistan won by 10 wickets
Queens Sports Club, Bulawayo
Umpires: DL Orchard (SA) and S Venkataraghavan (IND)
Player of the match: Mohammad Yousuf (PAK)

- Zimbabwe won the toss and elected to bat.
- The match was scheduled for five days but completed in four.
- MA Vermeulen (ZIM) made his Test debut.

== One Day Internationals (ODIs) ==
=== 1st ODI ===
23 November 2002
Scorecard

Pakistan; 302/4 (50 overs)	v	Zimbabwe; 295/9 (50 overs)
Mohammad Yousuf 141* (147); GW Flower 2/33 (10 overs)		A Flower 77 (98); Waqar Younis 3/50 (10 overs)

Pakistan won by 7 runs
Queens Sports Club, Bulawayo
Umpires: KC Barbour (ZIM) and DL Orchard (SA)
Player of the match: Mohammad Yousuf (PAK)

- Pakistan won the toss and elected to bat.
- Kamran Akmal (PAK) and S Matsikenyeri, BG Rogers and RW Sims (all ZIM) made their ODI debuts.

=== 2nd ODI ===
24 November 2002
Scorecard

Pakistan; 344/5 (50 overs)	v	Zimbabwe; 140/5 (33 overs)
Saleem Elahi 107 (112); CN Evans 2/18 (2 overs)		SM Ervine 61* (41); Wasim Akram 4/22 (7 overs)

Pakistan won by 104 runs (D/L method)
Queens Sports Club, Bulawayo
Umpires: MA Esat (ZIM) and DL Orchard (SA)
Player of the match: Saleem Elahi (PAK)

- Pakistan won the toss and elected to bat.
- Zimbabwe's target was reduced to 335 runs in 46 overs.
- When play was halted Zimbabwe needed to have scored 245 runs to win.
- W Mwayenga (ZIM) made his ODI debut.

=== 3rd ODI ===
27 November 2002
Scorecard

Pakistan; 323/3 (50 overs)	v	Zimbabwe; 275/7 (50 overs)
Saleem Elahi 108 (119); GW Flower 1/52 (10 overs)		MA Vermeulen 79 (81); Saqlain Mushtaq 3/41 (10 overs)

Pakistan won by 48 runs
Harare Sports Club, Harare
Umpires: KC Barbour (ZIM) and DL Orchard (SA)
Player of the match: Mohammad Yousuf (PAK)

- Zimbabwe won the toss and elected to field.

=== 4th ODI ===
30 November 2002
Scorecard

Zimbabwe; 210 (49.5 overs)	v	Pakistan; 211/2 (35.4 overs)
GW Flower 105* (146); Mohammad Sami 1/43 (5 overs)		Faisal Iqbal 100* (97); DT Hondo 3/11 (7 overs)

Pakistan won by 8 wickets
Harare Sports Club, Harare
Umpires: MA Esat (ZIM) and DL Orchard (SA)
Player of the match: Faisal Iqbal (PAK)

- Zimbabwe won the toss and elected to bat.

=== 5th ODI ===
1 December 2002
Scorecard

Pakistan; 300/7 (50 overs)	v	Zimbabwe; 230 (45.3 overs)
Younis Khan 90 (75); TJ Friend 2/57 (10 overs)		A Flower 72 (68); Shahid Afridi 3/45 (10 overs)

Pakistan won by 70 runs
Harare Sports Club, Harare
Umpires: KC Barbour (ZIM) and DL Orchard (SA)
Player of the match: Younis Khan (PAK)

- Zimbabwe won the toss and elected to field.
