= Pakistani cricket team in New Zealand in 1992–93 =

International cricket tour

The Pakistan national cricket team toured New Zealand in December and January 1992–93 and played a Test match against the New Zealand national cricket team, winning the match by 33 runs. New Zealand were captained by Ken Rutherford and Pakistan by Javed Miandad. In addition, the teams played a three-match series of Limited Overs Internationals (LOI) which New Zealand won 2–1.

== One Day Internationals (ODIs) ==
New Zealand won the series 2-1.

=== 1st ODI ===
26 December 1992
Scorecard

Pakistan; 158/8 (49 overs)	v	New Zealand; 108 (39.3 overs)
Rameez Raja 50 (102); CZ Harris 3/24 (10 overs)		MD Crowe 28 (48); Wasim Akram 5/19 (9 overs)

Pakistan won by 50 runs
Basin Reserve, Wellington
Umpires: RS Dunne and CE King
Player of the match: Wasim Akram (PAK)

- New Zealand won the toss and elected to field.
- The match was reduced from 50 to 49 overs per side.

=== 2nd ODI ===
28 December 1992
Scorecard

Pakistan; 136/8 (42 overs)	v	New Zealand; 137/4 (37.4 overs)
Saleem Malik 39 (87); GR Larsen 2/15 (9 overs)		MD Crowe 47* (74); Shahid Saeed 2/20 (7 overs)

New Zealand won by 6 wickets
McLean Park, Napier
Umpires: BL Aldridge and DM Quested
Player of the match: MD Crowe (NZ)

- New Zealand won the toss and elected to field.
- The match was reduced before play started to 42 overs per side.

=== 3rd ODI ===
30 December 1992
Scorecard

Pakistan; 139 (47.4 overs)	v	New Zealand; 140/4 (42.4 overs)
Javed Miandad 30 (72); W Watson 4/27 (8.4 overs)		MD Crowe 57* (98); Waqar Younis 1/27 (10 overs)

New Zealand won by 6 wickets
Eden Park, Auckland
Umpires: BL Aldridge and DB Cowie
Player of the match: MD Crowe (NZ)

- New Zealand won the toss and elected to field.

== Test series summary ==
2 – 5 January 1993
(5–day match)
Scorecard

Pakistan	v	New Zealand
216 (69.3 overs); Javed Miandad 92 (172); ML Su'a 5/73 (24 overs)		264 (109 overs); MJ Greatbatch 133 (317); Waqar Younis 4/59 (28 overs)
174 (55.1 overs); Inzamam-ul-Haq 75 (133); DK Morrison 5/41 (15 overs)		93 (43.3 overs); Extras 22; AH Jones 19 (59); Waqar Younis 5/22 (13.3 overs)

Pakistan won by 33 runs
Trust Bank Park, Hamilton
Umpires: BL Aldridge and RS Dunne
Player of the match: Wasim Akram (PAK)

- New Zealand won the toss and elected to field.
- The match was scheduled for five days but completed in four.
