= Pakistani cricket team in New Zealand in 1995–96 =

International cricket tour

The Pakistan national cricket team toured New Zealand in December 1995 and played a Test match against the New Zealand national cricket team, winning by 161 runs. New Zealand were captained by Lee Germon and Pakistan by Wasim Akram. In addition, the teams played a four-match series of Limited Overs Internationals (LOI) which was tied 2–2.

== Test match ==
8–12 December 1995
(5-day match)
Scorecard

Pakistan	v	New Zealand
208 (54.1 overs); Aamer Sohail 88 (94); CL Cairns 4/51 (11.1 overs)		286 (91.4 overs); CL Cairns 76 (111); Wasim Akram 5/53 (24.5 overs)
434 (145 overs); Ijaz Ahmed 103 (213); CL Cairns 3/114 (35 overs)		195 (80.4 overs); RG Twose 51* (166); Mushtaq Ahmed 7/56 (34.4 overs)

Pakistan won by 161 runs
Lancaster Park, Christchurch
Umpires: BC Cooray (SL) and RS Dunne (NZ)
Player of the match: Mushtaq Ahmed (PAK)

- New Zealand won the toss and elected to field.
- CM Spearman (NZ) made his Test debut.
- Wasim Akram became the second player to dismiss a father-son duo in Test cricket when he dismissed Chris Cairns in the first innings, having previously dismissed Lance Cairns.

== One Day Internationals (ODIs) ==
The series was tied 2-2.

=== 1st ODI ===
15 December 1995
Scorecard

Pakistan; 189/9 (50 overs)	v	New Zealand; 169 (47.4 overs)
Rameez Raja 35 (75); NJ Astle 2/34 (10 overs)		RG Twose 59 (93); Wasim Akram 3/18 (9.4 overs)

Pakistan won by 20 runs
Carisbrook, Dunedin
Umpires: RS Dunne and CE King
Player of the match: Waqar Younis (PAK)

- Pakistan won the toss and elected to bat.
- CM Spearman (NZ) made his ODI debut.

=== 2nd ODI ===
17 December 1995
Scorecard

Pakistan; 232/9 (50 overs)	v	New Zealand; 236/9 (49.5 overs)
Inzamam-ul-Haq 80 (95); DK Morrison 5/46 (10 overs)		CL Cairns 54 (63); Waqar Younis 3/55 (10 overs)

New Zealand won by 1 wicket
Lancaster Park, Christchurch
Umpires: CE King and DM Quested
Player of the match: Inzamam-ul-Haq (PAK)

- Pakistan won the toss and elected to bat.

=== 3rd ODI ===
20 December 1995
Scorecard

Pakistan; 261/4 (50 overs)	v	New Zealand; 207 (44.5 overs)
Aamer Sohail 58 (82); RG Twose 2/31 (7 overs)		LK Germon 40 (59); Wasim Akram 3/31 (7.5 overs)

Pakistan won by 54 runs
Basin Reserve, Wellington
Umpires: RS Dunne and EA Watkin
Player of the match: Wasim Akram (PAK)

- New Zealand won the toss and elected to field.

=== 4th ODI ===
23 December 1995
Scorecard

New Zealand; 244/8 (45 overs)	v	Pakistan; 212 (41.4 overs)
CM Spearman 48 (62); Waqar Younis 3/70 (9 overs)		Saleem Malik 58 (52); NJ Astle 3/42 (8 overs)

New Zealand won by 32 runs
Eden Park, Auckland
Umpires: BF Bowden and DB Cowie
Player of the match: NJ Astle (NZ)

- Pakistan won the toss and elected to field.
- The match was reduced before play started to 45 overs per side.
