= Pakistani cricket team in Bangladesh in 2001–02 =

	Bangladesh	Pakistan
- Dates: 9 – 25 January 2002
Captains	Khaled Mashud	Waqar Younis

Test series
- Result: Pakistan won the 2-match series 2–0
Most runs	Habibul Bashar (106)	Mohammad Yousuf (276)
Most wickets	Mohammad Sharif (6)	Danish Kaneria (13)

One Day International series
- Results: Pakistan won the 3-match series 3–0
Most runs	Tushar Imran (129)	Younis Khan (161)
Most wickets	Mohammad Sharif (5)	Abdul Razzaq (8)

The Pakistan national cricket team toured Bangladesh in January 2002 to play 2 Tests and 3 ODIs. Pakistan won both the series, test by 2–0 and ODI 3–0. Pakistan were captained by Waqar Younis and Bangladesh by Khaled Mashud.

== Test series ==
=== 1st Test ===
9–11 January 2002
Scorecard

Bangladesh	v	Pakistan
160 (53.2 overs); Habibul Bashar 53 (90); Waqar Younis 6/55 (16.2 overs)		490/9dec (140.4 overs); Abdul Razzaq 134 (235); Enamul Haque 4/136 (39.4 overs)
152 (43.4 overs); Fahim Muntasir 33 (54); Danish Kaneria 7/77 (19.4 overs)

Pakistan won by an innings and 178 runs
Bangabandhu National Stadium, Dhaka
Umpires: AFM Akhtaruddin (BAN) and JH Hampshire (ENG)
Player of the match: Abdul Razzaq (PAK)

- Pakistan won the toss and elected to field.
- The match was scheduled for five days but completed in three.
- Fahim Muntasir (BAN) made his Test debut.

=== 2nd Test ===
16–18 January 2002
Scorecard

Bangladesh	v	Pakistan
148 (56.4 overs); Khaled Mashud 28 (60); Saqlain Mushtaq 5/35 (16.4 overs)		465/7dec (134.5 overs); Mohammad Yousuf 204* (243); Mohammad Sharif 4/98 (35.5 overs)
148 (38.5 overs); Habibul Bashar 51 (49); Waqar Younis 4/36 (8.5 overs)

Pakistan won by an innings and 169 runs
M. A. Aziz Stadium, Chittagong
Umpires: Mahbubur Rahman (BAN) and RB Tiffin (ZIM)
Player of the match: Mohammad Yousuf (PAK)

- Bangladesh won the toss and elected to bat.
- The match was scheduled for five days but completed in three.

== ODI Series ==
=== 1st ODI ===
22 January 2002
Scorecard

Pakistan; 202 (49.5 overs)	v	Bangladesh; 153/7 (50 overs)
Rashid Latif 79 (83); Tareq Aziz 3/19 (10 overs)		Khaled Mashud 54* (103); Shoaib Akhtar 2/9 (8 overs)

Pakistan won by 49 runs
M. A. Aziz Stadium, Chittagong
Umpires: AFM Akhtaruddin and Sailab Hossain
Player of the match: Rashid Latif (PAK)

- Pakistan won the toss and elected to bat.
- Tareq Aziz (BAN) made his ODI debut.

=== 2nd ODI ===
24 January 2002
Scorecard

Pakistan; 281/5 (50 overs)	v	Bangladesh; 209/8 (50 overs)
Mohammad Yousuf 112* (108); Mohammad Sharif 2/59 (10 overs)		Tushar Imran 65 (93); Shahid Afridi 3/11 (7 overs)

Pakistan won by 72 runs
Bangabandhu National Stadium, Dhaka
Umpires: Showkatur Rahman and Syed Mahabubullah
Player of the match: Mohammad Yousuf (PAK)

- Pakistan won the toss and elected to bat.

=== 3rd ODI ===
25 January 2002 (D/N)
Scorecard

Bangladesh; 220 (48.5 overs)	v	Pakistan; 221/2 (35.3 overs)
Tushar Imran 43 (56); Abdul Razzaq 6/35 (9.5 overs)		Shahid Afridi 83 (44); Khaled Mahmud 1/43 (6.3 overs)

Pakistan won by 8 wickets
Bangabandhu National Stadium, Dhaka
Umpires: Jahangir Alam and Mesbahuddin Ahmed
Player of the match: Shahid Afridi (PAK)

- Bangladesh won the toss and elected to bat.
- Pakistan innings limited to 49 overs due to their slow over rate.
