= Jalal-ud-Din (cricketer) =

Pakistani cricketer (born 1959)

Jalal-ud-din
Personal information
- Born: 12 June 1959 (age 67); Karachi, Pakistan
- Batting: Right-handed
- Bowling: Right-arm fast-medium

International information
- National side: Pakistan (1982-1985)
- Test debut (cap 91): 14 October 1982 v Australia
- Last Test: 16 October 1985 v Sri Lanka
- ODI debut (cap 39): 12 March 1982 v Sri Lanka
- Last ODI: 2 October 1983 v India

Career statistics
Competition	Test	ODI	FC
Matches	6	8	70
Runs scored	3	5	684
Batting average	3.00	2.50	12.21
100s/50s	0/0	0/0	0/0
Top score	2	5	45
Balls bowled	1,197	306	12,109
Wickets	11	14	261
Bowling average	48.81	15.07	24.14
5 wickets in innings	0	0	18
10 wickets in match	0	0	5
Best bowling	3/77	4/32	7/43
Catches/stumpings	0/–	1/–	12/–
- Source: ESPNcricinfo, 4 February 2006

Jalal-ud-din (born 12 June 1959) is a Pakistani former cricketer who played in six Test matches and eight One Day Internationals from 1982 to 1985.

== Cricket career ==
A specialist right-arm pace bowler, Jalal played first-class cricket in Pakistan from 1977–78 to 1988–89. His father and older brother also played first-class cricket.

He was the first player to take a hat-trick in ODI cricket, while playing against Australia at Niaz Stadium, Hyderabad on 20 September 1982. The three victims were Allan Border, Rod Marsh and Bruce Yardely.

== Coaching career ==
Jalal is now a coach, and is the only Pakistani Test cricketer who has the accreditation as both an ECB and PCB level 3 coach. As of February 2021, he was a level 4 coach.

In January 2018, he was appointed chief selector to the Pakistan women's team. In March 2019, former Pakistan women's team captain Urooj Mumtaz replaced him in the position.

In October 2020, he was appointed as USA's national selector for the South-West Zone, responsible for selecting the men's seniors and youth teams.

== Cricket academies ==
Considered a pioneer of "cricket academies concept" in Pakistan, Jalal established the Customs Cricket Academy (CCA) in 1999, and the Vital Five Cricket Academy (VFCA) in 2009, both in Karachi. In August 2009, the Korangi Town administration launched another of his cricket academies, the Jalaluddin Cricket Academy (JCA), in Karachi's Zaman Town. Aiming to nurture talent at grassroots level, it offers free coaching through highly trained professionals to under-privileged local cricketers.
