= Ravi Ratnayeke =

Sri Lankan businessman and cricketer (born 1960)

Personal information
- Full name: Joseph Ravindran Ratnayeke
- Born: 2 May 1960 (age 66); Colombo, Dominion of Ceylon
- Batting: Left-handed
- Bowling: Right-arm fast-medium
- Role: All-rounder

International information
- National side: Sri Lanka (1982–1990)
- Test debut (cap 12): 5 March 1982 v Pakistan
- Last Test: 16 December 1989 v Australia
- ODI debut (cap 25): 12 March 1982 v Pakistan
- Last ODI: 2 May 1990 v Australia

Domestic team information
- Years: Team
- 1989: Nondescripts

Career statistics
Competition	Test	ODI	FC	LA
Matches	22	78	71	90
Runs scored	807	824	2,225	934
Batting average	25.21	14.98	28.52	15.56
100s/50s	0/5	0/1	1/11	0/2
Top score	93	50	107	51
Balls bowled	3,833	3,573	9,388	4,060
Wickets	56	85	133	98
Bowling average	35.21	33.71	36.77	32.82
5 wickets in innings	4	0	5	0
10 wickets in match	0	0	0	0
Best bowling	8/83	4/23	8/83	4/23
Catches/stumpings	1/–	14/–	18/–	15/–
- Source: Cricinfo, 23 January 2013

Joseph Ravindran Ratnayeke (born 2 May 1960), is a Sri Lankan businessman and former cricketer who was ODI captain of Sri Lanka national cricket team. Ratnayeke played 22 Tests and 78 ODIs from 1982 to 1990, his Test best bowling performance of eight wickets for 83 runs at Jinnah Stadium (Sialkot) Pakistan was a Sri Lankan Test record at the time, and was also vice captain to Arjuna Ranatunga.

He left Sri Lankan citizenship in 1990 and is now Australian.

Ratnayeke was described by Cricinfo writer Johann Jayasekera as able "to bowl with a lively pace and move the ball in favourable conditions", and also as "a competent batsman".

== Education ==
He was educated at St. Anthony's College, Kandy and later moved to Trinity College Kandy.

== Domestic career ==
Ratnayake made his debut in first class cricket for Sri Lanka Under–25s against Tamil Nadu Under–25s in 1980–81. Opening the bowling with Ashantha de Mel, Ratnayeke took three wickets, and impressed the Sri Lankan selectors enough to go on tour of England in 1981. Playing six of Sri Lanka's fifteen matches on tour, Ratnayeke took nine wickets, five of which came in one match against Sussex.

When Sri Lanka played their first Test match in February 1982, against England, Ratnayeke did not feature in the XI, though Wisden Cricketer's Almanack said after the series that leaving Ratnayeke out "gave their captain an unbalanced attack in which only De Mel was more than medium pace".

== International career ==
He did play a tour match for the Sri Lanka Board President's XI, taking five wickets for 120, and when Sri Lanka went to Pakistan the following month, he played the first and third Tests and all three ODIs. Ratnayeke was said to "improve as the tour progressed" by Wisden, though he was noted as a bowler who gave little support to Sri Lanka's main three. Ratnayeke took three of Sri Lanka's seven wickets in the final Test at Lahore, which Sri Lanka lost by an innings and 120 runs, and also the wicket of Zaheer Abbas in the second ODI, which Sri Lanka won on scoring rate.

== After cricket ==
Ratnayeke retired from cricket at the age of 30, at the end of the 1989–90 season. Shortly after, he emigrated to Perth, Australia, where he played grade cricket. He and his family later moved to Melbourne, where he gained a job with Amcor, a packaging company. Ratnayeke currently lives in Rowville, Victoria, with his wife and two children, and holds Australian citizenship.
