= Mohammad Aslam (umpire) =

Pakistani cricket umpire (born 1949)

Mian Mohammad Aslam
Personal information
- Born: 1 April 1949 (age 77); Lahore, Pakistan

Umpiring information
- Tests umpired: 8 (1984–2001)
- ODIs umpired: 18 (1982–2002)
- Source: Cricinfo, 12 July 2013

Mian Mohammad Aslam (born 1 April 1949) is a Pakistani former cricket umpire. He stood in eight Test matches between 1984 and 2001 and 18 ODI games between 1982 and 2002. Aslam has worked as a chief organiser of Muslim Gymkhana, Lahore.

His brother, Mian Pervez Akhtar, was a match referee and coach at the Muslim Gymkhana.

== See also ==
- List of Test cricket umpires
- List of One Day International cricket umpires
