= Javed Akhtar (cricketer) =

Pakistani cricketer and umpire (1940–2016)

Personal information
- Born: 21 November 1940; Delhi, British India
- Died: 8 July 2016 (aged 75); Rawalpindi, Punjab, Pakistan
- Batting: Right-handed
- Bowling: Right-arm offbreak

International information
- National side: Pakistan
- Only Test (cap 39): 5 July 1962 v England

Umpiring information
- Tests umpired: 18 (1980–1998)
- ODIs umpired: 40 (1976–1999)

Career statistics
Competition	Test	First-class
Matches	1	51
Runs scored	4	835
Batting average	4.00	15.75
100s/50s	0/0	0/0
Top score	2	88
Balls bowled	96	9,148
Wickets	0	187
Bowling average	–	18.21
5 wickets in innings	–	12
10 wickets in match	–	3
Best bowling	–	7/56
Catches/stumpings	0/–	38/–
- Source: ESPNcricinfo, 12 June 2017

Javed Akhtar (21 November 1940 – 8 July 2016) was a Pakistani cricketer who played one Test match for his country, in 1962. An off spinner, Akhtar had success at the first-class level, taking his wickets at an average of 18.17, but struggled in his only Test, failing to take a wicket.

He later became an umpire, officiating in 18 Tests and 40 One Day Internationals from 1980 to 1999.

== See also ==
- List of Test cricket umpires
- List of One Day International cricket umpires
