= Shakeel Khan (umpire) =

Pakistani cricketer and umpire (born 1952)

Personal information
- Full name: Mohammad Shakeel Khan
- Born: 22 December 1952 (age 73); Karachi, Pakistan

Umpiring information
- Tests umpired: 6 (1983–2002)
- ODIs umpired: 16 (1982–1996)
- WODIs umpired: 4 (2001–2005)
- Source: Cricinfo, 16 July 2013

Shakeel Khan (born 22 December 1952) is a Pakistani former first-class cricketer and umpire. He stood in six Test matches between 1983 and 2002 and 16 One Day Internationals between 1982 and 1996. He also officiated in first-class fixtures at the domestic level.

== See also ==
- List of Test cricket umpires
- List of One Day International cricket umpires
