= India–Pakistan cricket rivalry =

Sporting rivalry between India and Pakistan

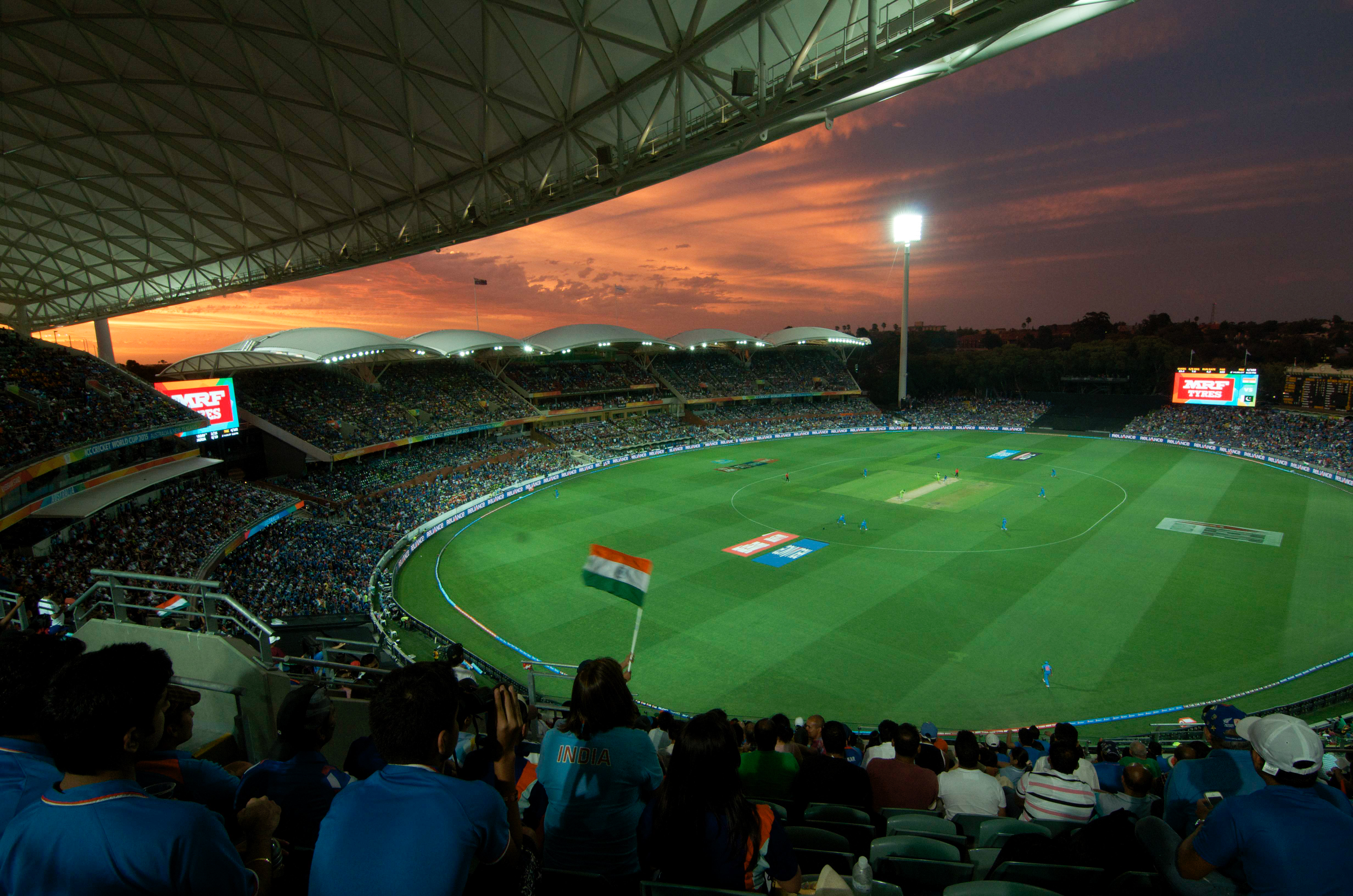
- Panoramic view of the 2015 Cricket World Cup match between India and Pakistan
- Sport: Cricket
- Teams: India; Pakistan
- First meeting: Test: 16–19 October 1952 (India won the match by an innings and 70 runs); ODI: 1 October 1978 (India won by 4 runs); T20I: 14 September 2007, 2007 World Twenty20 (India won by bowl-out after scores tied)
- Latest meeting: Test: 8–12 December 2007 (Match Drawn); ODI: 23 February 2025, 2025 ICC Champions Trophy (India won by 6 wickets); T20I: 3 October 2026, 2026 Asian Games (India won by 19 runs)
- Next meeting: Test: TBD; ODI: TBD; T20I: TBD
- Trophy: India: 19 2 Cricket World Cups 3 T20 World Cups 3 Champions Trophies 9 Asia Cups 2 Asian Games; Pakistan: 6 1 Cricket World Cup 1 T20 World Cup 1 Champions Trophy 2 Asia Cups 1 Asian Championship

Statistics
- Total meetings: Test: 59; ODI: 136; T20I: 18; Total: 213
- Most wins: Test: (Pakistan 12; India 9); ODI: (Pakistan 73; India 58); T20I: (India 15; Pakistan 3); Total: (Pakistan 88; India 82)

The India–Pakistan cricket rivalry is one of the most intense sports rivalries in the world. Matches between the teams are considered some of the biggest in the world and are among the most-viewed in all of sports.

Across all formats, India and Pakistan have played each other 213 times, with Pakistan winning 88 matches and India winning 82. In Tests and ODIs, Pakistan has won more matches than India, while in T20Is, India has won more matches than Pakistan. Across all ICC World Cups, the two teams have faced each other 17 times, with India winning 16 matches and Pakistan winning 1 match. Both teams have won the ICC Cricket World Cup, the ICC T20 World Cup, and the ICC Champions Trophy. In total, India has won 8 ICC titles, while Pakistan has won 3.

The tense relations between the two nations, resulting from bitter diplomatic relations and conflict that originated during the Partition of British India into India and Pakistan in 1947, the Indo-Pakistani Wars, Kashmir conflict, and Pakistani state sponsored terrorism laid the foundations for the emergence of a fierce sporting rivalry between the two nations who had shared a common cricketing heritage.

The two teams first played in 1952, when Pakistan toured India. Since then numerous Test series and, later, One Day International (ODI) series have been played, although a number of planned tours by both teams have been cancelled or aborted due to political factors. No cricket was played between the two countries from 1962 to 1977 due to two major wars in 1965 and 1971, and the 1999 Kargil War and the 2008 Mumbai terrorist attacks also interrupted cricketing ties between the two nations.

In the 1980s and 1990s, the growth of large expatriate populations from both countries across the world led to neutral venues to host bilateral and multilateral ODI series featuring the two teams. In addition, there has always been high demand for tickets for the matches between the two in global ICC competitions, with over 800,000 ticket applications made for their meeting in the 2019 ICC Cricket World Cup; the television transmission of the match was watched by 273 million viewers.

Players from both teams routinely face extreme pressure to win and are threatened by extreme reactions in defeat. Extreme fan reactions to defeats in key matches have been recorded, with a limited degree of hooliganism. At the same time, India–Pakistan matches have also offered opportunities for cricket diplomacy as a means to improve relations between the two countries, allowing heads of state and cricket followers from either country to travel to the other to watch the matches.

The last full bilateral tour between the teams was Pakistan's tour of India in 2007, where both Test and ODI series were played. However, following the 2008 terror attacks in Mumbai, orchestrated by Pakistan-based terror group Lashkar-e-Taiba, India suspended the planned 2009 series and all future engagements with Pakistan. The attack eventually led to detrimental consequences for both nations, in diplomacy and cricket. Since then, the two teams have only met in ICC and ACC tournaments, with India winning most of their meetings. In 2025, following their Asia Cup match, Indian captain Suryakumar Yadav stated that the India–Pakistan matchup was "not a rivalry anymore". Pakistan's last victory against India came in 2022 Asia Cup.

== History ==
The Partition of British India in 1947 that led to the creation of independent Indian and Pakistani states was characterised by bloody conflict between ethnic groups that left one million people dead and led to the mass-migration of an estimated ten million people between either nation. The legacy of Partition and subsequent territorial disputes has contributed to intense rivalries in field hockey, association football, and especially cricket, which was introduced during British colonial rule and is the most popular sport in both countries.

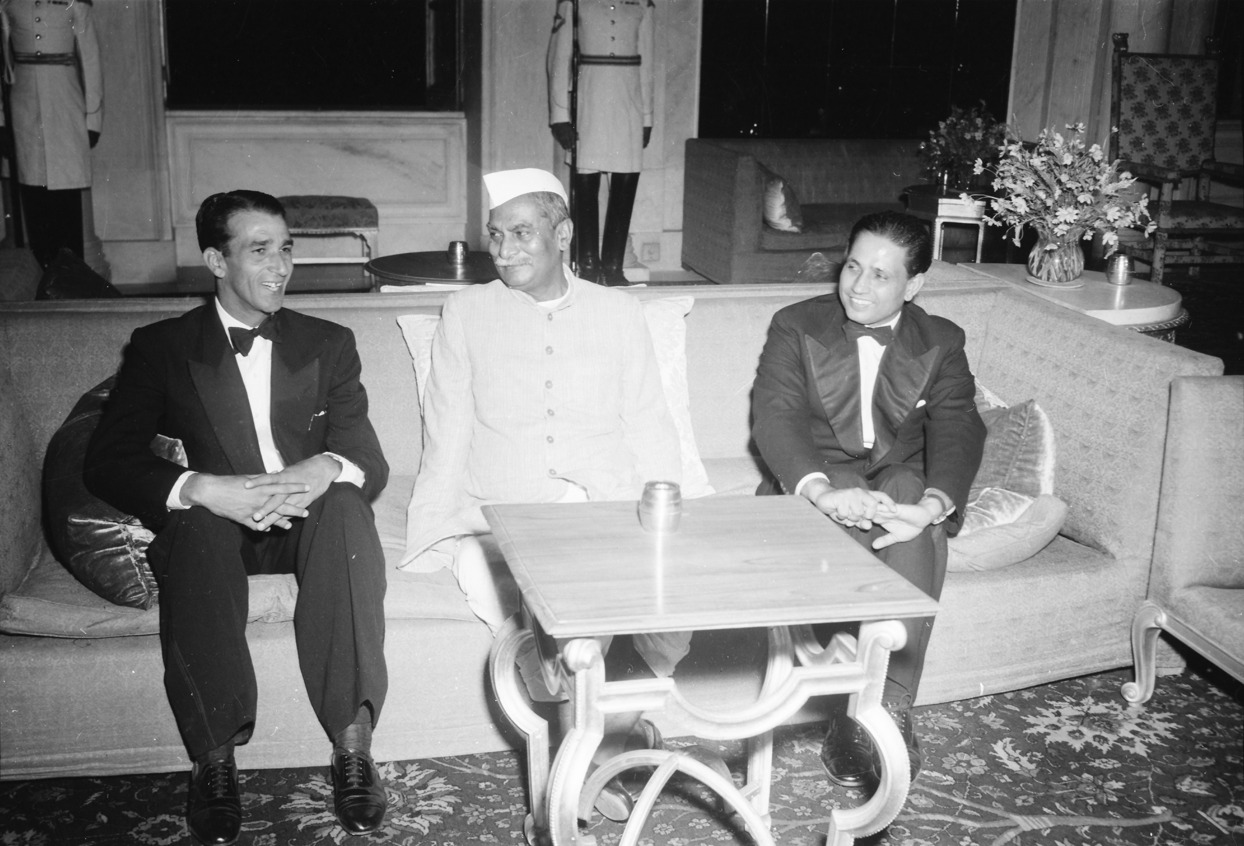
Captains Abdul Kardar of Pakistan (left) and Lala Amarnath of India (right) with Indian President Rajendra Prasad (center) on the day of the first test, 16 October 1952

Pakistan became a member of the Imperial Cricket Conference (now the International Cricket Council) in 1948, (Note: The Imperial Cricket Conference was renamed the International Cricket Conference in 1965 and later became the International Cricket Council. It organises international cricket across the globe.) becoming a Full Member (Note: Full Member status grants the member the right to play in Test matches.) in July 1952. (Note: The Indian cricket team had been awarded Full Member status in 1926 and prior to Partition had represented the whole of British India.) Their tour of India later the same year saw the team play their first Test matches. They lost the first Test in Delhi to India, but won the second Test in Lucknow, which led to an angry reaction from the home crowd against the Indian players. India clinched the Test series after winning the third Test in Bombay, but the intense pressure affected the players of both teams to the point that they pursued mainly defensive tactics that led to drawn matches and whole series without a victory. When India toured Pakistan in 1955, thousands of Indian fans were granted visas to go to the Pakistani city of Lahore to watch the Test match, but both the 1955 series and Pakistan's tour of India in 1961 ended in drawn series, with neither team being able to win a single Test match. Complaints about the fairness of umpires became routine.

The Indo-Pakistani War of 1965 and subsequent War of 1971 put a hold on matches between the two teams that lasted till 1978, when India toured Pakistan and cricket between the two countries resumed for a brief period. In the post-1971 period, politics became a direct factor in the holding of cricketing events. India has suspended cricketing ties with Pakistan several times following terrorist attacks or other hostilities. The resumption of cricketing ties in 1978 came with the emergence of heads of government in both India and Pakistan who were not directly connected with the 1971 war and coincided with their formal initiatives to normalise bilateral relations.

In the late 1980s and for most of the 1990s, India and Pakistan played each other only at neutral venues such as Sharjah in the United Arab Emirates and in the Canadian city of Toronto, where large audiences of expatriates regularly watched matches between the teams. The series between the teams in Canada in the 1990s and early 2000s were officially known as the "Friendship Cup". Sharjah, even though a neutral venue, was considered as the "back yard of Pakistan" given the close proximity and the massive support the team generated.

The rise of multinational competitions, such as the ICC Cricket World Cup, ICC T20 World Cup, ICC Champions Trophy, and the Asia Cup led to more regular, albeit briefer, contests between the two teams.

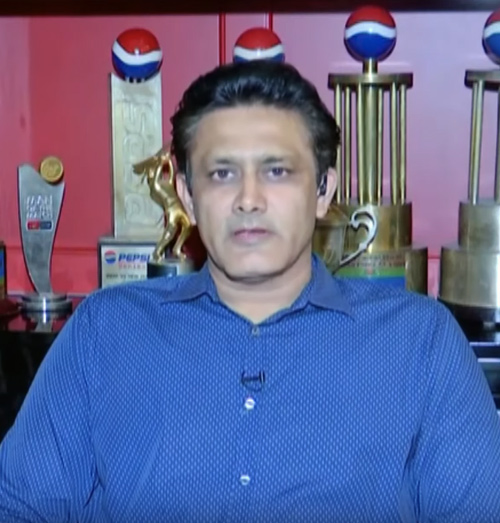
Anil Kumble became the second bowler in cricket history to take ten wickets in an innings in a match against Pakistan in 1999

In 1999, immediately following Indian Prime Minister Atal Bihari Vajpayee's historic visit to Pakistan, the Pakistani team toured India for a series of Test matches and One Day Internationals. The 2 match test series was drawn 1-1, and during the 2nd innings of second test, Anil Kumble took all 10 wickets, becoming the first Indian bowler to achieve the feat. The Kargil War later in the year caused tensions between the countries and cricket was again suspended.

=== 21st century ===
Vajpayee's peace initiative of 2003 led to India touring Pakistan after a gap of almost 15 years. During the 2004 tour to Pakistan, Virender Sehwag scored his first triple century in the first Test, scoring 309 from 375 balls, and was awarded player of the match. The 2004 series was won by India, 2–1 in Test matches and 3–2 in ODI matches. Subsequent exchange tours were held from March to April 2005 in India, January to February 2006 in Pakistan, and November to December 2007 in India. The 2005 Test series ended in a 1–1 draw, while the ODI series was won by Pakistan 4–2. The 2006 Test series was won by Pakistan 1–0, with the first 2 Test matches ending in a draw, while India won the ODI series 4–1. The 2007 series was won by India in both Test and ODI formats, by margins of 1–0 and 3–2, respectively. The 2007 series would remain as the last full bilateral series played between India and Pakistan.

The 2008 Mumbai terror attacks on 26–29 November 2008 by the Pakistan-based terrorist group Lashkar-e-Taiba dealt a major blow to the diplomatic and cricketing ties between India and Pakistan. It led to the suspension of India's planned tour of Pakistan in 2009 and all future engagements in Pakistan. Since then, India has refused to play any bilateral series against Pakistan, meeting only at Asian and ICC events. Furthermore, Pakistani players were excluded from the Indian Premier League, following which their contracts were terminated, with the inaugural season being the only one where they participated.

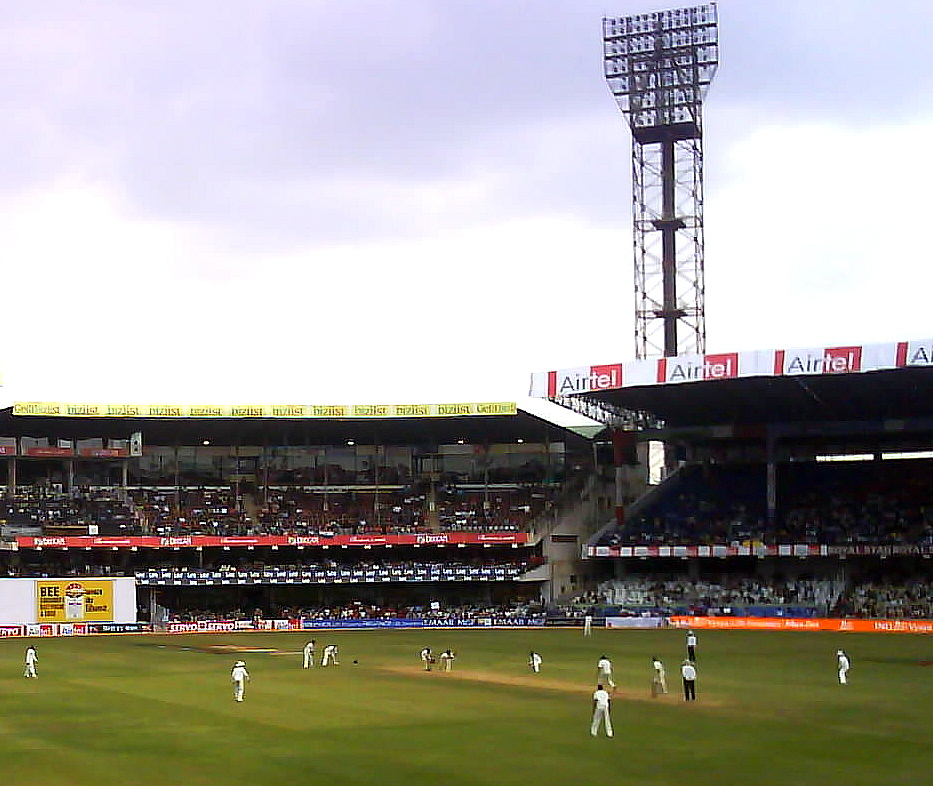
Play from the last Test Match meeting between India and Pakistan, Bangalore, December 2007.

The 2009 attack on the Sri Lanka national cricket team in Lahore led to the suspension of international tours of Pakistan, and no Test series were played in the country for a decade. Pakistan was also removed as a co-host for the 2011 Cricket World Cup which had been due to be played across the Indian subcontinent. (Note: The 2011 Cricket World Cup was hosted by India, Bangladesh and Sri Lanka.) India and Pakistan qualified for the first semi-final of the tournament and the Indian government invited the Pakistani Prime Minister Yousuf Raza Gilani to watch the match along with his Indian counterpart, Manmohan Singh.

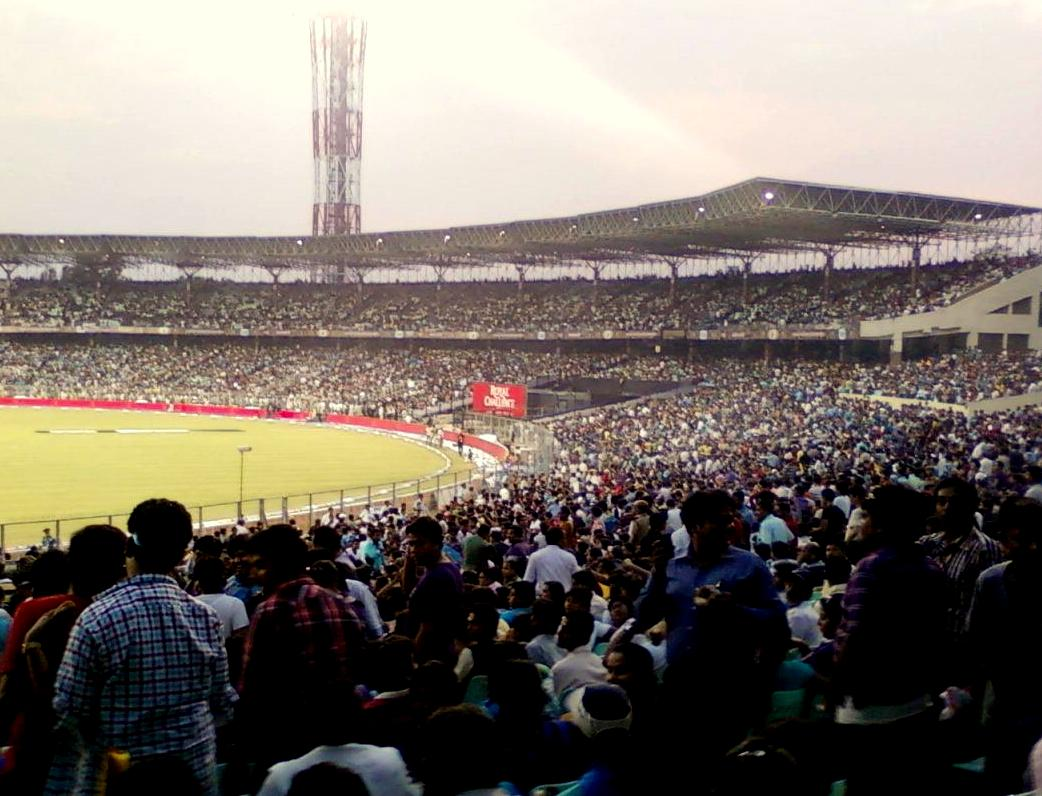
The second match of the series, Kolkata, January 2013.

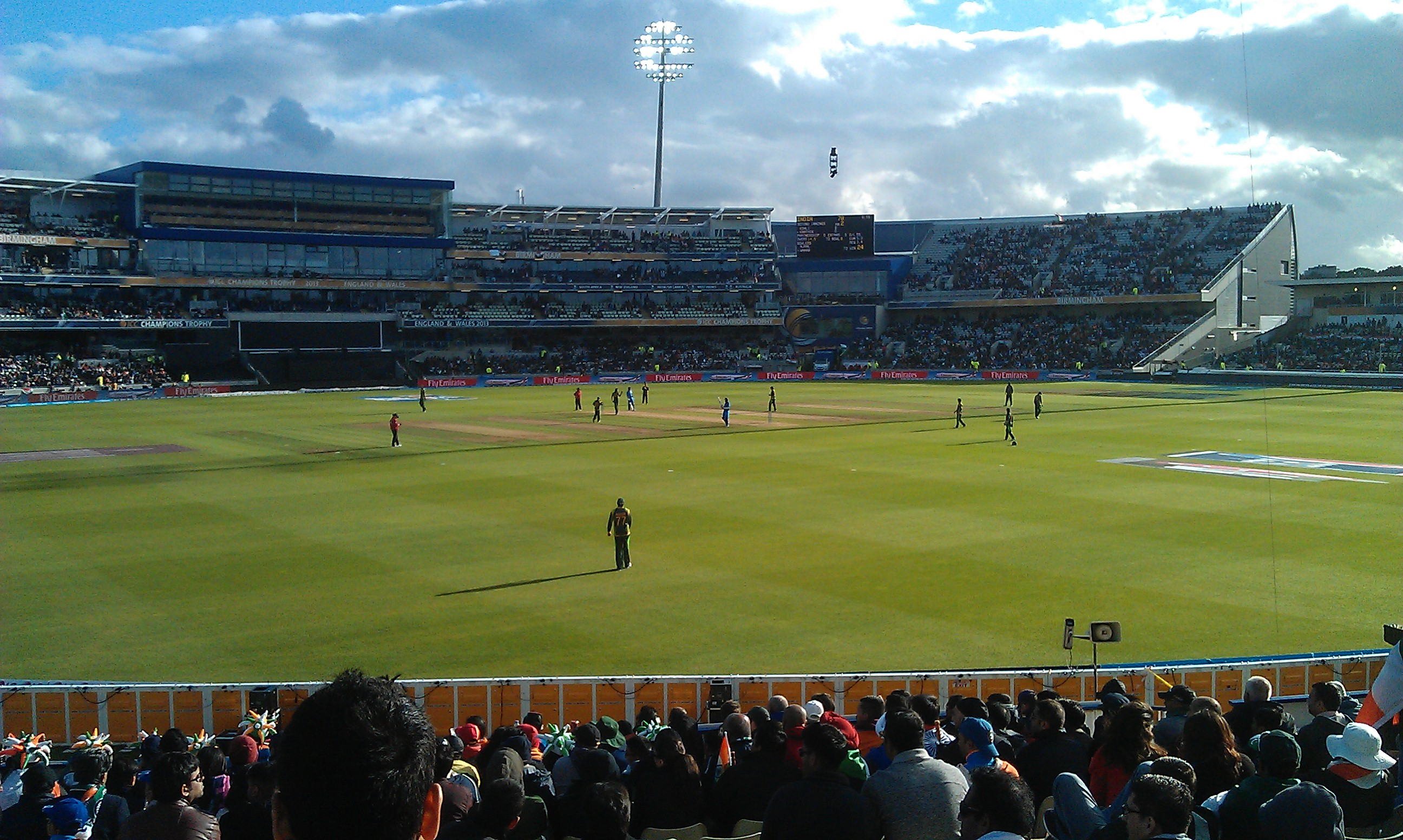
India and Pakistan during the 2013 ICC Champions Trophy.

Bilateral ties finally resumed when the Board of Control for Cricket in India (BCCI) invited the Pakistan national team to tour India for three ODIs and two T20Is in December 2012. In June 2014, the Pakistan Cricket Board (PCB) announced that an agreement to play six bilateral series across eight years between the two teams had reached. After lengthy negotiations involving offers and counter-offers on the venues and scheduling of the first of these series in December 2015, the boards were unable to reach an agreement. In May 2017, the BCCI accounted that it would need approval from the Indian government before a bilateral series could go ahead. There was no further progress, despite members of both boards meeting in Dubai to discuss the matter.

In October 2021, during the T20 World Cup, the teams played their 200th international match against each other. Pakistan won the fixture by ten wickets, their first in 13 attempts against India in World Cup tournaments of either format.

In October 2021, following a meeting with the ACC, Ramiz Raja confirmed that Pakistan would host the Asia Cup in 2023, with Sri Lanka hosting the 2022 edition. In October 2022, the Board of Control for Cricket in India (BCCI) secretary and ACC President Jay Shah announced that India would not travel to Pakistan, citing security concerns, and that the Asia Cup 2023 would take place in a neutral venue. In December 2022, the then PCB chairman Ramiz Raja said that Pakistan might consider pulling out of the tournament if their hosting rights were withdrawn because of India's unwillingness to travel to Pakistan. The PCB had threatened to boycott the 2023 Cricket World Cup in India after the Board of Control for Cricket in India (BCCI) refused to send a team to the Asia Cup. This issue was later resolved, and Pakistan eventually participated in the 2023 Cricket World Cup in India.

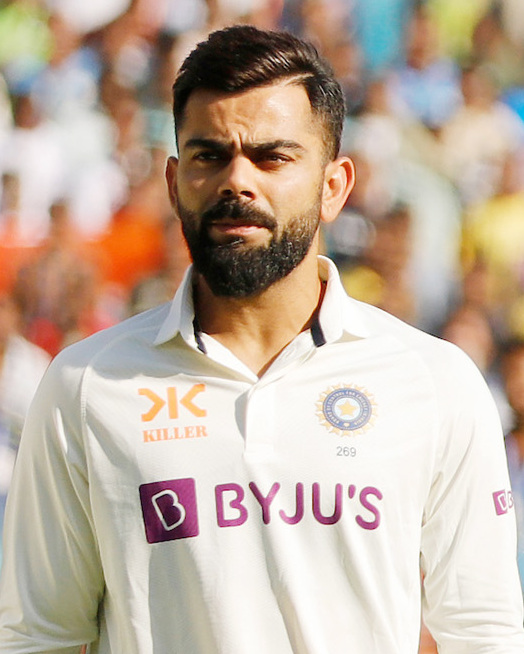
Virat Kohli is the only player to win Player of the Match vs Pakistan in all ICC formats events

In January 2023, ACC confirmed the teams and groups of the Asia Cup, with both India and Pakistan taking part. In March 2023, it was proposed that Pakistan remain as hosts and that all India matches - including at least two India-Pakistan contests - would be played at a neutral venue yet to be confirmed. The hybrid model proposed by Pakistan was rejected by Sri Lanka and Bangladesh. In response, PCB Chairman Najam Sethi proposed two options. The first option was that India play all their matches at a neutral venue with Pakistan hosting the rest of the teams. The second option was that four matches in the group stage take place in Pakistan whereas the second phase, in which matches played by the Indian team followed by the next stage matches including the final, be played at a neutral venue. Sri Lanka and Bangladesh agreed to the second option. On 15 June 2023, the Asian Cricket Council announced that the tournament would be organized in a hybrid model with four matches being held in Pakistan, and the remaining nine in Sri Lanka.

India and Pakistan met twice in the 2023 Asia Cup. Though the first match in the Group stage yielded a no result due to rain, India defeated Pakistan by an enormous margin in the Super Four clash between the 2 teams, scoring 356 for the loss of only 2 wickets. India in this match not only set their highest-ever score in ODI cricket against Pakistan, but also defeated them with the highest ever run margin of 228 runs, bundling Pakistan out for 128. India would eventually go on to win this Asia Cup, while Pakistan would be knocked out in the super-fours round. India won the match against Pakistan at the 2024 Men's T20 World Cup by 6 runs, which was also the first ICC tournament to be held in United States of America. Then in 2025, India again defeated Pakistan; this time in the 2025 ICC Champions Trophy by 6 wickets with Virat Kohli scoring his 51st century in ODI cricket.

The 2025 Asia Cup was a heavily tense situation for both teams, mostly due to the Pahalgam terror attack by Pakistan-based terror group The Resistance Front and the military conflict in the aftermath of the attack. Before the tournament, there were calls for boycott, but eventually the Government of India gave a go-ahead. During the group stage, the Indian team led by Suryakumar Yadav refused to shake hands after defeating Pakistan, with Yadav dedicating the victory to the victims of Pahalgam attack and Indian Army. In the super four stage, Pakistani cricketers Haris Rauf and Sahibzada Farhan made insensitive gestures in the match: while Rauf made a "jet crashing" gesture and a "6-0" finger sign, interpreted by media as a symbolic reference to Pakistan's claim of shooting down six Indian aircraft during Operation Sindoor, Farhan celebrated his half-century by mimicking firing a rifle with his bat. Yadav and Rauf were fined 30% of their match fees, while Farhan received a warning. Following the final, in which India defeated Pakistan again, a major controversy erupted as the Indian team refused to accept the winning trophy from ACC president Mohsin Naqvi, who also serves as Pakistan's Interior Minister and Chairman of the PCB, and this led to a delay in handing out other awards. Yadav later said the team had been "denied" the opportunity to lift the trophy and criticized the handling of the ceremony. Naqvi handed the trophy to the UAE cricket authorities when the BCCI threatened to impeach him from the ACC presidency for misconduct.

Following the men's Asia Cup victory, the BCCI asked the women's team to avoid shaking hands with the Pakistani women's team during the 2025 Women's Cricket World Cup.

During the 2026 Men's T20 World Cup, the Pakistani team was reportedly asked by their Government not to play the initial group stage match with India, citing the ICC's refusal to relocate Bangladesh's matches out of India to Sri Lanka, due to the removal of Mustafizur Rahman from the 2026 Indian Premier League. However, the ICC warned the PCB of possible sanctions for a potential boycott of the match against India, and eventually went ahead. During the coin toss, there was no handshake between the Indian captain Suryakumar Yadav and the Pakistani captain Salman Ali Agha, which was also followed after India had defeated Pakistan.

== Results ==
As of 3 October 2026

Across all formats, India and Pakistan have played each other 213 times, with Pakistan winning 88 matches and India winning 82. In Tests and ODIs, Pakistan has won more matches than India, while India has won 15 of the 18 T20Is between the two teams. (Note: The 2007 T20 World Cup group stage match between the two teams ended in scores tied. India was declared as the winner after a bowl-out victory.)

Format	Matches played	India wins	Pakistan wins	Draw/No result
Test	59	9	**12**	38
ODI	136	58	**73**	5
T20I	18	**15**	3	0
Total	213	82	88	43

- **Bold** indicates most wins.

=== Current rankings ===
Format	India	Pakistan
Test	**4th**	9th
ODI	**1st**	5th
T20I	**1st**	6th
Last updated: 3 October 2026

=== Official titles won ===
As of 3 October 2026

Senior titles won	India	Pakistan
ICC Cricket World Cup	**2**	1
ICC T20 World Cup	**3**	1
ICC Champions Trophy	**3**	1
ICC World Test Championship	0	0
Asia Cup	**9**	2
Asian Games	**2**	0
Asian Test Championship	0	**1**
Total senior titles	19	6

Youth titles won	India	Pakistan
Under-19 ICC Cricket World Cup	**6**	2
Under-19 Men's Asia Cup	**9**	2
Total youth titles	15	4

== ICC matches ==
In ICC Cricket World Cups, India and Pakistan have met eight times, with India winning all eight matches to lead 8–0. In the 2011 Cricket World Cup, India and Pakistan met in a World Cup semi-final for the first time, with India winning by 29 runs. Their most recent meeting was in Ahmedabad in the 2023 Cricket World Cup, where India defeated Pakistan by 7 wickets.

In ICC T20 World Cups, the two teams have faced each other nine times, with India leading the head-to-head record 8–1. In 2007, India and Pakistan met in the final of the inaugural T20 World Cup, with India winning the match by 5 runs. This was the first time the two teams met in an ICC final. In the 2021 T20 World Cup, Pakistan defeated India by 10 wickets, marking its first win over India in a T20 World Cup match.

In the ICC Champions Trophy, India and Pakistan have played each other six times, with each team winning three matches. In 2017, India and Pakistan met in the ICC Champions Trophy final, which Pakistan won by 180 runs. The margin of victory was the largest in any ICC ODI tournament final in terms of runs.

Head-to-head record (ICC matches)
Tournament	Matches played	India wins	Pakistan wins	No result
Cricket World Cup	8	8	0	0
T20 World Cup	9	8	1	0
Champions Trophy	6	3	3	0
World Test Championship	0	0	0	0
Total	23	19	4	0

== ACC matches ==
India and Pakistan have met 21 times in the ACC Asia Cup across formats. India has won 13 of those matches, while Pakistan has won six, with two matches ending without a result due to rain. (Note: The 1997 Asia Cup match was abandoned after nine overs due to bad light and rain. It was due to be replayed the following day but this match was abandoned without a ball being bowled due to rain.) The two teams also played a Test match in the 1999 Asian Test Championship, with Pakistan winning by 46 runs.

In the 2025 Asia Cup, India and Pakistan met three times, with India winning all three matches, including the final by 5 wickets. It was the first time the two teams had met in an Asia Cup final since the tournament's inception in 1984.

Head-to-head record (ACC matches)
Tournament	Matches played	India wins	Pakistan wins	No result
Asia Cup (ODI)	15	8	5	2
Asia Cup (T20I)	6	5	1	0
Asian Test Championship	1	0	1	0
Total	22	13	7	2

== Multi-sport events ==
India and Pakistan faced each other in the 2026 Asian Games for the first time in multi-sport events.

Head-to-head record
Tournament	Matches played	India wins	Pakistan wins	No result
Asian Games (T20I)	1	1	0	0
Total	1	1	0	0

== ICC titles won ==
The International Cricket Council (ICC) is the world's governing body for cricket, responsible for organising and administering major international competitions. India and Pakistan have competed in all major ICC competitions, namely the Cricket World Cup, T20 World Cup, Champions Trophy, and World Test Championship.

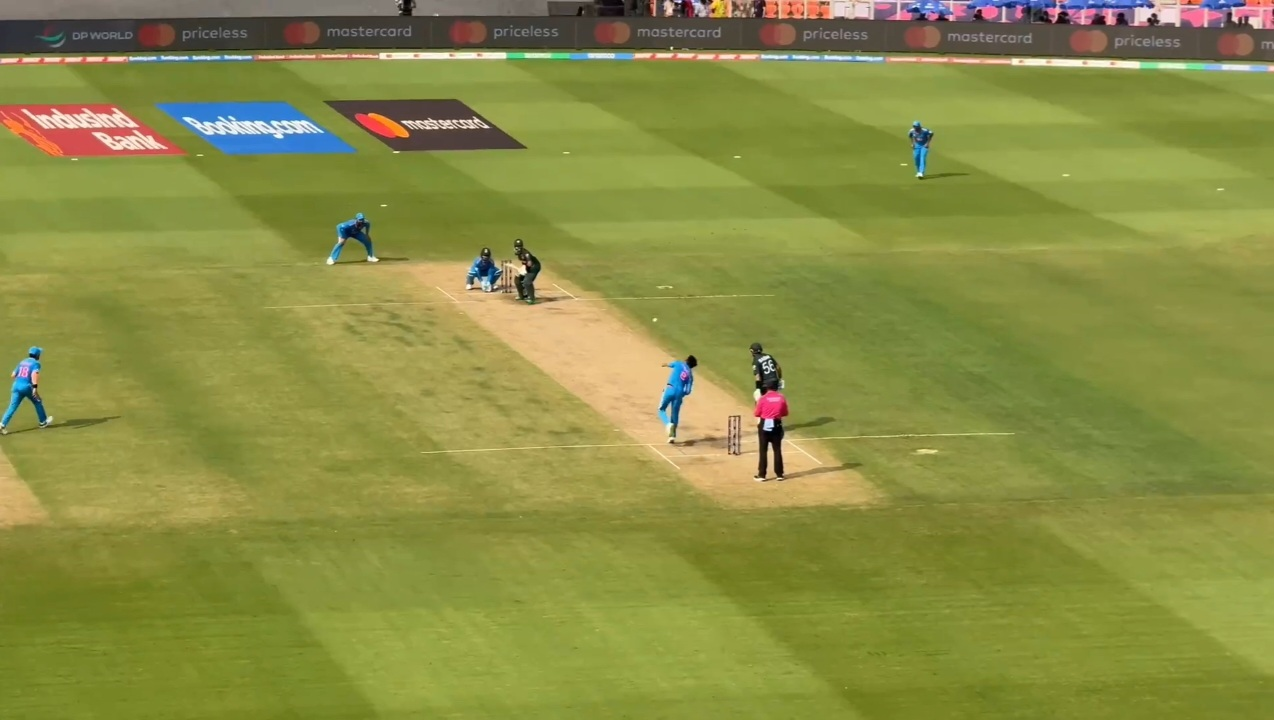
Match between India and Pakistan at 2023 Cricket World Cup

In terms of ICC titles, India has won the ICC Cricket World Cup twice, while Pakistan has won it once. In addition, India has won the ICC T20 World Cup three times, including the inaugural 2007 edition, in which it defeated Pakistan in the final. Meanwhile, Pakistan has won the T20 World Cup once. India has also won the ICC Champions Trophy three times, while Pakistan won the 2017 edition, defeating India in the final. Neither team has secured the ICC World Test Championship, although India finished as runners-up in the first two editions.

ICC titles won
Tournament	India	Pakistan
ICC Cricket World Cup	2 (1983, 2011)	1 (1992)
ICC T20 World Cup	3 (2007, 2024, 2026)	1 (2009)
ICC Champions Trophy	3 (2002, 2013, 2025)	1 (2017)
ICC World Test Championship	0	0
Total ICC titles	8	3

== ACC titles won ==
The Asian Cricket Council (ACC) is the governing body responsible for organising and administering cricket tournaments in Asia, particularly the Asia Cup. There have been 17 editions of the continental tournament so far. India has been the most successful team, winning 9 Asia Cups, while Pakistan has won 2 Asia Cups. Pakistan also won the 1999 Asian Test Championship, an ACC tournament.

The 2025 Asia Cup featured the first-ever Asia Cup final between India and Pakistan, with India defeating Pakistan to win the title.

ACC titles won
Tournament	India	Pakistan
ACC Asia Cup (ODI)	7	2
ACC Asia Cup (T20I)	2	0
Asian Test Championship	0	1
Total ACC titles	9	3

== List of ICC match results ==
=== ICC Cricket World Cups (head-to-head results) ===
Year	Stage	Venue	Result	Player of the match	Scorecard
1992	Group Stage	Sydney Cricket Ground, Sydney, Australia	India won by 43 runs	(India) Sachin Tendulkar	Scorecard
1996	Quarter-Finals	M Chinnaswamy Stadium, Bangalore, India	India won by 39 runs	(India) Navjot Sidhu	Scorecard
1999	Super Six	Old Trafford, Manchester, England	India won by 47 runs	(India) Venkatesh Prasad	Scorecard
2003	Group Stage	Centurion Park, Centurion, South Africa	India won by 6 wickets	(India) Sachin Tendulkar	Scorecard
2011	Semi-Final	Punjab Cricket Association Stadium, Mohali, India	India won by 29 runs	(India) Sachin Tendulkar	Scorecard
2015	Group Stage	Adelaide Oval, Adelaide, Australia	India won by 76 runs	(India) Virat Kohli	Scorecard
2019	Group Stage	Old Trafford, Manchester, England	India won by 89 runs (DLS)	(India) Rohit Sharma	Scorecard
2023	Group Stage	Narendra Modi Stadium, Ahmedabad, India	India won by 7 wickets	(India) Jasprit Bumrah	Scorecard
2027	Group Stage	Wanderers Stadium, Johannesburg, South Africa			Scorecard

An overview of the teams' performances in each World Cup is given in the table below, with the number of participating teams shown in brackets.

No. of teams/ Year Team	(8) 1975	(8) 1979	(8) 1983	(8) 1987	(9) 1992	(12) 1996	(12) 1999	(14) 2003	(16) 2007	(14) 2011	(14) 2015	(10) 2019	(10) 2023	Apps.
India	GP	GP	W	SF	7th	SF	6th	RU	GP	W	SF	SF	RU	13
Pakistan	GP	SF	SF	SF	W	QF	RU	GP	GP	SF	QF	5th	5th	13

Legend

- W – Winner
- RU– Runner up
- SF– Semi-finals
- QF– Quarter-finals (1996, 2011–2015)
- GP – Group stage / First round
- — Hosts

=== ICC Men's T20 World Cups (head-to-head results) ===
Year	Stage	Venue	Result	Player of the match	Scorecard
2007	Group Stage	Kingsmead Cricket Ground, Durban, South Africa	India won by bowl-out	(Pakistan) Mohammad Asif	Scorecard
2007	Final	Wanderers Stadium, Johannesburg, South Africa	India won by 5 runs	(India) Irfan Pathan	Scorecard
2012	Super 8s	R. Premadasa Stadium, Colombo, Sri Lanka	India won by 8 wickets	(India) Virat Kohli	Scorecard
2014	Super 10	Sher-e-Bangla Stadium, Dhaka, Bangladesh	India won by 7 wickets	(India) Amit Mishra	Scorecard
2016	Super 10	Eden Gardens, Kolkata, India	India won by 6 wickets	(India) Virat Kohli	Scorecard
2021	Super 12	Dubai International Stadium, Dubai, UAE	Pakistan won by 10 wickets	(Pakistan) Shaheen Afridi	Scorecard
2022	Super 12	Melbourne Cricket Ground, Melbourne, Australia	India won by 4 wickets	(India) Virat Kohli	Scorecard
2024	Group Stage	Nassau County Stadium, East Meadow, US	India won by 6 runs	(India) Jasprit Bumrah	Scorecard
2026	Group Stage	R. Premadasa Stadium, Colombo, Sri Lanka	India won by 61 runs	(India) Ishan Kishan	Scorecard

=== ICC Champions Trophy (head-to-head results) ===
Year	Stage	Venue	Result	Player of the match	Scorecard
2004	Group Stage	Rose Bowl, Southampton, England	Pakistan won by 3 wickets	(Pakistan) Mohammad Yousuf	Scorecard
2009	Group Stage	SuperSport Park, Centurion, South Africa	Pakistan won by 54 runs	(Pakistan) Shoaib Malik	Scorecard
2013	Group Stage	Edgbaston, Birmingham, England	India won by 8 wickets	(India) Bhuvneshwar Kumar	Scorecard
2017	Group Stage	Edgbaston, Birmingham, England	India won by 124 runs	(India) Yuvraj Singh	Scorecard
2017	Final	The Oval, London, England	Pakistan won by 180 runs	(Pakistan) Fakhar Zaman	Scorecard
2025	Group Stage	Dubai International Stadium, Dubai, UAE	India won by 6 wickets	(India) Virat Kohli	Scorecard

== List of Test series ==
=== Overall Test match results ===
Decade	Matches	Result		
Decade	Matches	India	Pakistan	Drawn
1950s	10	2	1	7
1960s	5	0	0	5
1970s	9	2	2	5
1980s	20	0	4	16
1990s	3	1	2	0
2000s	12	4	3	5
2010s	–	–	–	–
2020s	–	–	–	–
Total	59	9	12	38

Fifteen Test series have been played between India and Pakistan, along with a one-off Test in the 1999 Asian Test Championship. Eight of the series have been hosted by India, while seven have been hosted by Pakistan.

In terms of Test series wins, both India and Pakistan have won four series each. This includes one away series win for each team, with Pakistan winning 1–0 in India in 1987 and India winning 2–1 in Pakistan in 2004. Overall, Pakistan has won more head-to-head Test matches than India, although the two teams have not played each other in Tests since 2007.

Season	Host	Test series start date	Tests	India won	Pakistan won	Drawn	Winner
1952–53	India	16 October 1952	5	2	1	2	India
1954–55	Pakistan	1 January 1955	5	0	0	5	Drawn
1960–61	India	2 December 1960	5	0	0	5	Drawn
1978–79	Pakistan	16 October 1978	3	0	2	1	Pakistan
1979–80	India	21 November 1979	6	2	0	4	India
1982–83	Pakistan	10 December 1982	6	0	3	3	Pakistan
1983–84	India	14 September 1983	3	0	0	3	Drawn
1984–85	Pakistan	17 October 1984	2	0	0	2	Drawn
1986–87	India	3 February 1987	5	0	1	4	Pakistan
1989–90	Pakistan	15 November 1989	4	0	0	4	Drawn
1998–99	India	28 January 1999	2 (Note: One other match was played as part of the Asian Test Championship immediately after the conclusion of the two-match series. Pakistan won this match. The Championship has only been played twice. On the second occasion India withdrew due to political tensions with Pakistan.)	1	1	0	Drawn
2003–04	Pakistan	28 March 2004	3	2	1	0	India
2004–05	India	8 March 2005	3	1	1	1	Drawn
2005–06	Pakistan	13 January 2006	3	0	1	2	Pakistan
2007–08	India	22 November 2007	3	1	0	2	India
Total	15		58 (Note: One additional match was played in February 1999 as part of the Asian Test Championship. Pakistan won this match)	9	11	38	

== List of ODI series ==
=== Overall ODI match results ===
As of 23 February 2025

Decade	Matches	Result		
Decade	Matches	India	Pakistan	No result
1970s	3	1	2	0
1980s	30	9	19	2
1990s	45	17	26	2
2000s	40	18	22	0
2010s	14	10	4	0
2020s	4	3	0	1
Total	136	58	73	5

The two teams have played a total of 16 ODI series. (Note: In cricket a series is a set number of matches played between two teams over a relatively short period of time. The two teams have also met in a number of other competitions featuring other teams, including ICC competitions and a number of one-off series of matches.) Five of these have been played in India, while Pakistan has hosted seven series. Four series have been played in neutral venues, including three in Canada from 1996 to 1998 and one in the United Arab Emirates. Pakistan has won nine of the series, while India has won five. Meanwhile, the 1984-85 ODI series was abandoned during the 2nd match (due to assassination of Indira Gandhi). On the other hand, the 2005-06 series held in the UAE was the only series to be drawn.

Season	Host	Date of first match	Matches	India won	Pakistan won	No Result	Winner
1978–79	Pakistan	1 October 1978	3	1	2	0	Pakistan
1982–83	Pakistan	3 December 1982	4	1	3	0	Pakistan
1983–84	India	10 September 1983	2	2	0	0	India
1984–85	Pakistan	12 October 1984	2	0	1	1	Abandoned
1986–87	India	27 January 1987	6	1	5	0	Pakistan
1989–90	Pakistan	16 December 1989	3	0	2	1	Pakistan
1996	Canada	16 September 1996	5	2	3	0	Pakistan
1997	Canada	13 September 1997	5	4	1	0	India
1997–98	Pakistan	28 September 1997	3	1	2	0	Pakistan
1998	Canada	12 September 1998	5	1	4	0	Pakistan
2003–04	Pakistan	13 March 2004	5	3	2	0	India
2004–05	India	2 April 2005	6	2	4	0	Pakistan
2005–06	Pakistan	6 February 2006	5	4	1	0	India
2005–06	UAE	18 April 2006	2	1	1	0	Drawn
2007–08	India	5 November 2007	5	3	2	0	India
2012–13	India	30 December 2012	3	1	2	0	Pakistan
Total			64	27	35	2	

== List of T20I series ==
=== Overall T20I match results ===
As of 3 October 2026

Decade	Matches	Result		
Decade	Matches	India	Pakistan	No result
2000s	2	2	0	0
2010s	6	5	1	0
2020s	10	8	2	0
Total	18	15	3	0

The teams have only played one T20I series, a two match series played in 2012 as part of Pakistan's tour of India. Each team won one match, leaving the series drawn.

Year(s)	Host	Date of first match	Matches	India won	Pakistan won	No Result	Winner
2012–13	India	25 December 2012	2	1	1	0	Drawn
Total			2	1	1	0	

== Test Records ==
=== Team records ===
Most runs in an innings
Runs	Team	Venue	Season
699/5	Pakistan	Lahore	1989–90
679/7d	Pakistan	Lahore	2005–06
675/5d	India	Multan	2003–04
674/6	Pakistan	Faisalabad	1984–85
652	Pakistan	Faisalabad	1982–83

Fewest runs in a completed innings
Runs	Team	Venue	Season
106	India	Lucknow	1952–53
116	Pakistan	Bangalore	1986–87
126	India	New Delhi	1979–80
145	India	Bangalore	1986–87
145	India	Karachi	1954–55

Greatest win margins (by innings)
Margin	Winning team	Venue	Season
Innings and 131 runs	India	Rawalpindi	2003–04
Innings and 119 runs	Pakistan	Hyderabad	1982–83
Innings and 86 runs	Pakistan	Karachi	1982–83
Innings and 70 runs	India	New Delhi	1952–53
Innings and 52 runs	India	Multan	2003–04

Greatest win margins (by runs)
Margin	Winning team	Venue	Season
341 runs	Pakistan	Karachi	2005–06
212 runs	India	New Delhi	1998–99
195 runs	India	Kolkata	2004–05
168 runs	Pakistan	Bangalore	2004–05
131 runs	India	Mumbai	1979–80

Smallest victories
Margin	Winning team	Venue	Season
12 runs	Pakistan	Chennai	1998–99
16 runs	Pakistan	Bangalore	1986–87
46 runs	Pakistan	Kolkata	1998–99

=== Individual ===
Leading run scorer and wicket taker in India vs Pakistan tests

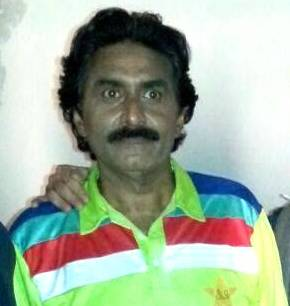
Javed Miandad
(2,228 runs)

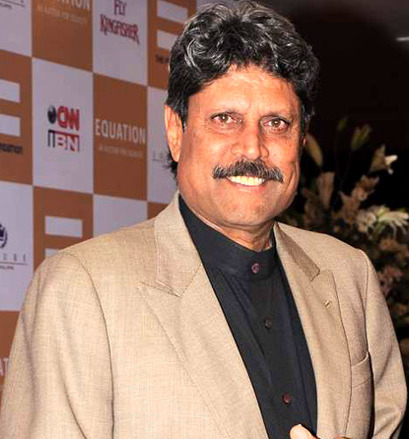
Kapil Dev
(99 wickets)

Javed Miandad scored 2,228 runs in 28 matches at an average of 67.51, making him the highest run-scorer in India vs. Pakistan Tests. Sunil Gavaskar follows with 2,089 runs in 24 matches at an average of 52.22. Kapil Dev leads the wicket charts with 99 wickets in 29 matches at an average of 28.50, while Imran Khan is close behind with 94 wickets in 23 matches at an average of 24.12. Both Miandad and Gavaskar scored five centuries each, while Imran Khan recorded seven five-wicket hauls compared to Kapil Dev's four.

Most runs
Runs	Player	Span
2,228 (39 innings)	(Pakistan) Javed Miandad	1978–1989
2,089 (41 innings)	(India) Sunil Gavaskar	1978–1987
1,740 (25 innings)	(Pakistan) Zaheer Abbas	1978–1984
1,431 (25 innings)	(Pakistan) Mudassar Nazar	1978–1984
1,321 (17 innings)	(Pakistan) Younis Khan	2005–2007

Highest individual score
Runs	Player	Venue	Date
309	(India) Virender Sehwag	Multan	28 March 2004
280*	(Pakistan) Javed Miandad	Hyderabad	14 January 1983
270	(India) Rahul Dravid	Rawalpindi	13 April 2004
267	(Pakistan) Younis Khan	Bangalore	24 March 2005
254	(India) Virender Sehwag	Lahore	13 January 2006

Most career wickets
Wickets	Player	Matches	Bowling average
99	(India) Kapil Dev	29	30.12
94	(Pakistan) Imran Khan	23	24.04
81	(India) Anil Kumble	15	31.97
45	(Pakistan) Wasim Akram	12	28.86
44	(Pakistan) Fazal Mahmood	14	24.54

Best bowling figures in an innings
Bowling	Player	Venue	Date
10/74	(India) Anil Kumble	New Delhi	4 February 1999
8/52	(India) Vinoo Mankad	New Delhi	16 October 1952
8/60	(Pakistan) Imran Khan	Karachi	23 December 1982
8/69	(Pakistan) Sikander Bakht	New Delhi	4 December 1979
8/85	(India) Kapil Dev	Lahore	23 January 1983

== ODI records ==
=== Team ===
Highest innings total
Score	Team	Venue	Season
356/2 (50 overs)	India	Colombo	2023
356/9 (50 overs)	India	Visakhapatnam	2004–05
349/7 (50 overs)	India	Karachi	2003–04
344/8 (50 overs)	Pakistan	Karachi	2003–04
338/4 (50 overs)	Pakistan	The Oval, London	2017

Lowest innings total
Score	Team	Venue	Season
79 (34.2 overs)	India	Sialkot	1978–79
87 (32.5 overs)	Pakistan	Sharjah, UAE	1984–85
112 (30.2 overs)	India	Lahore	1989–90
116 (45 overs)	Pakistan	Toronto, Canada	1997
125 (45 overs)	India	Sharjah, UAE	1998–99

Largest victory
Margin	Winning team	Venue	Season
228 runs	India	Colombo	2023
180 runs	Pakistan	The Oval, London	2017
159 runs	Pakistan	New Delhi	2004–05
143 runs	Pakistan	Jaipur	1998–99
140 runs	India	Dhaka, Bangladesh	2008

Smallest victory
Margin	Winning team	Venue	Season
4 runs	India	Quetta	1978–79
4 runs	Pakistan	Sharjah, UAE	1991–92
5 runs	India	Karachi	2003–04
7 runs	Pakistan	Gujranwala	1989–90
7 runs	Pakistan	Peshawar	2005–06
Source: ESPNcricinfo.

=== Individual ===
Leading run scorer and wicket taker in India vs Pakistan ODIs

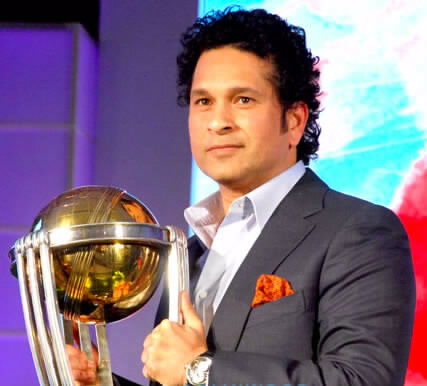
Sachin Tendulkar
(2,526 runs)

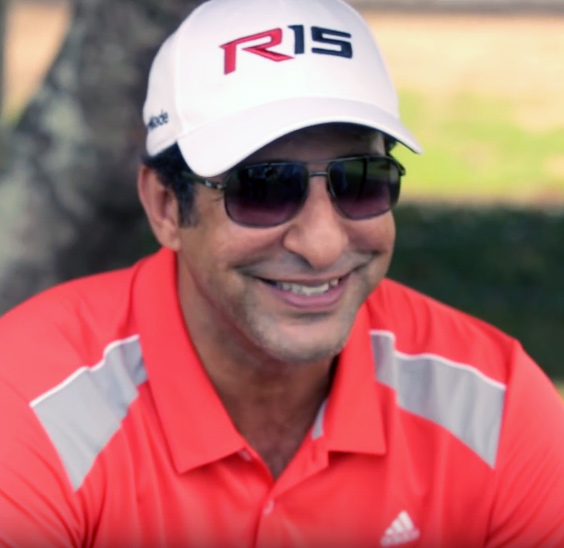
Wasim Akram
(60 wickets)

Sachin Tendulkar, with 2,526 runs in 69 matches, is the highest run-scorer in India vs. Pakistan ODIs. This includes five centuries and 16 fifties, with a highest score of 141. Inzamam-ul-Haq follows closely with 2,403 runs in 67 matches, averaging 43.69, with four centuries and 12 fifties, and a highest score of 123. Wasim Akram leads the wicket charts with 60 wickets in 48 matches at an average of 25.15 and an economy rate of 3.73, with his best bowling figures being 4/35. Saqlain Mushtaq is just behind him with 57 wickets in 36 matches, averaging 24.38, with an economy rate of 4.52, and his best bowling performance being 5/45.

Most career runs
Runs	Player	Years
2,526 (67 innings)	(India) Sachin Tendulkar	1989–2012
2,403 (64 innings)	(Pakistan) Inzamam-ul-Haq	1992–2006
2,002 (48 innings)	(Pakistan) Saeed Anwar	1989–2003
1,899 (55 innings)	(India) Rahul Dravid	1996–2009
1,782 (42 innings)	(Pakistan) Shoaib Malik	2000–2019

Highest individual score
Runs	Player	Venue	Date
194	(Pakistan) Saeed Anwar	Chennai	21 May 1997
183	(India) Virat Kohli	Dhaka, Bangladesh	18 March 2012
148	(India) MS Dhoni	Visakhapatnam	5 April 2005
143	(Pakistan) Shoaib Malik	Colombo, Sri Lanka	25 July 2004
141	(India) Sachin Tendulkar	Rawalpindi	16 March 2004

Most wickets in a career
Wickets	Player	Matches	Bowling average
60	(Pakistan) Wasim Akram	48	25.15
57	(Pakistan) Saqlain Mushtaq	36	24.38
54	(India) Anil Kumble	34	24.25
54	(Pakistan) Aaqib Javed	39	24.64
54	(India) Javagal Srinath	36	30.68

Best bowling figures
Bowling	Player	Venue	Date
7/37	(Pakistan) Aaqib Javed	Sharjah, UAE	25 October 1991
6/14	(Pakistan) Imran Khan	Sharjah, UAE	22 March 1985
6/27	(Pakistan) Naved-ul-Hasan	Jamshedpur	9 April 2005
5/16	(India) Sourav Ganguly	Toronto, Canada	18 September 1997
5/19	(Pakistan) Aaqib Javed	Sharjah, UAE	7 April 1995

== T20I records ==
As of 3 October 2026

The two teams have played each other eighteen times in Twenty20 Internationals (T20Is). Nine of these matches have taken place in T20 World Cups, including the final of the 2007 T20 World Cup, and six have taken place in Asia Cups, including the final of the 2025 Asia Cup. There was also a 2026 Asian Games final, and a two-match T20I series played in India in 2012.

The highest team score in a T20I between the two teams is India's 211/6 at the Kōrogi Sports Park in Nisshin during the 2026 Asian Games final. Pakistan's highest T20I score against India is 192/6, made during the same match. The lowest total is Pakistan's 83 all out in Dhaka at the 2016 Asia Cup.

In India–Pakistan T20Is, the highest individual score is Hassan Nawaz's 96 scored at the 2026 Asian Games final in Nisshin, Japan. India's Virat Kohli holds the record for the most runs in T20Is between the two teams.

The best bowling figures in India–Pakistan T20Is are 4/18 by Mohammad Asif, recorded in their group stage match at the 2007 T20 World Cup in South Africa. Another notable performance is 4/30 by Kuldeep Yadav in the 2025 Asia Cup final. Meanwhile, India's Hardik Pandya has taken the most wickets in T20Is between the two teams.

=== Team ===
Highest innings total
Score	Team	Venue	Season
211/6 (20 overs)	India	Nisshin	2026
192/5 (20 overs)	India	Ahmedabad	2012
192/6 (20 overs)	Pakistan	Nisshin	2026
182/5 (19.5 overs)	Pakistan	Dubai	2022
181/7 (20 overs)	Pakistan	Ahmedabad	2012
181/7 (20 overs)	India	Dubai	2022

Lowest innings total
Score	Team	Venue	Season
83 (17.3 overs)	Pakistan	Mirpur	2016
113/7 (20 overs)	Pakistan	New York	2024
114 (18 overs)	Pakistan	Colombo	2026
119 (19 overs)	India	New York	2024
127/9 (20 overs)	Pakistan	Dubai	2025

=== Individual ===
Leading run scorer and wicket taker in India vs Pakistan T20Is

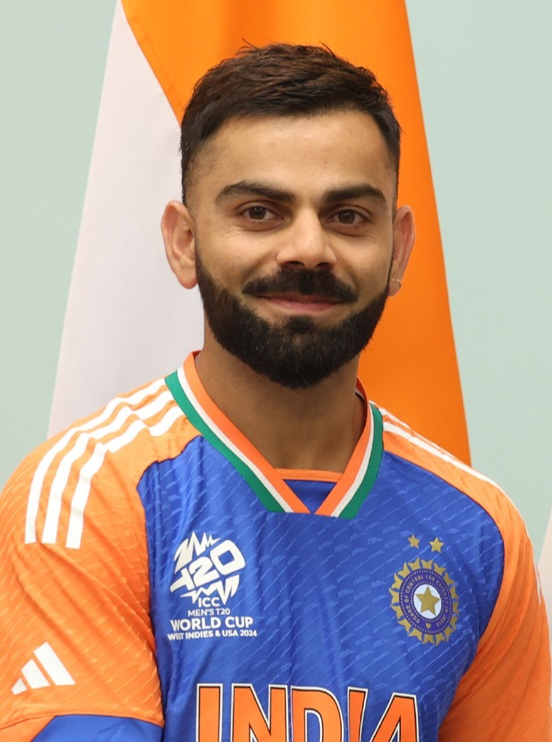
Virat Kohli
(492 runs)

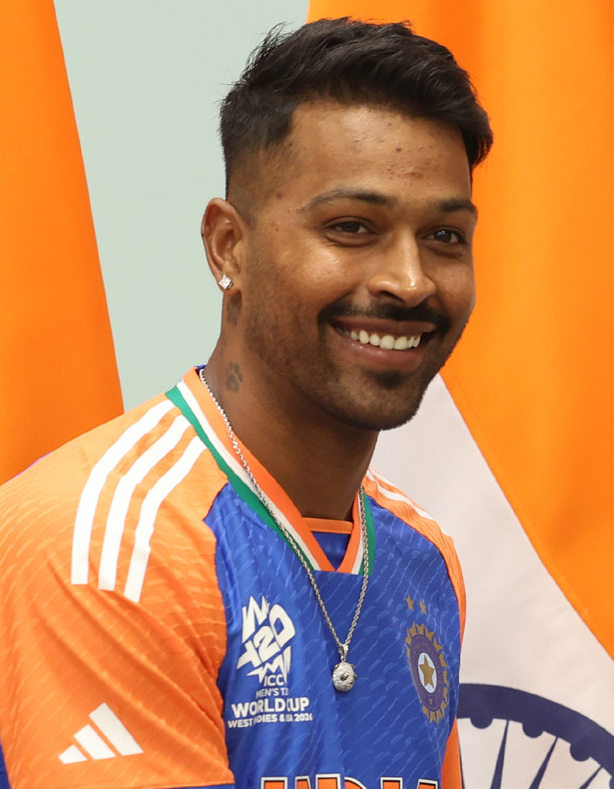
Hardik Pandya
(17 wickets)

Virat Kohli is the highest run-scorer in India vs. Pakistan T20Is, with 492 runs in 11 innings at an impressive average of 70.28, including five half-centuries and a highest score of 82*. Mohammad Rizwan follows with 228 runs in 5 innings at an average of 57.00, with two half-centuries and a highest score of 79*. Hardik Pandya is the leading wicket-taker, claiming 17 wickets in 9 innings at a remarkable average of 13.82, with best bowling figures of 3/8.

Most career runs
Runs	Player	Years
492 (11 innings)	(India) Virat Kohli	2012–2024
228 (5 innings)	(Pakistan) Mohammad Rizwan	2021–2024
206 (5 innings)	(India) Tilak Varma	2025–
171 (5 innings)	(India) Abhishek Sharma	2025–
165 (5 innings)	(Pakistan) Sahibzada Farhan	2025–

Highest individual score
Runs	Player	Venue	Date
96	(Pakistan) Hassan Nawaz	Nisshin	3 Oct 2026
82*	(India) Virat Kohli	Melbourne	23 Oct 2022
79*	(Pakistan) Mohammad Rizwan	Dubai	24 Oct 2021
78*	(India) Virat Kohli	Colombo	30 Sept 2012
77	(India) Ishan Kishan	Colombo	15 Feb 2026

Most wickets in a career
Wickets	Player	Innings	Economy
17	(India) Hardik Pandya	9	7.70
11	(Pakistan) Umar Gul	6	8.27
11	(India) Bhuvneshwar Kumar	7	7.26
11	(India) Jasprit Bumrah	9	7.18
9	(India) Kuldeep Yadav	4	6.20
9	(India) Axar Patel	7	7.10
9	(Pakistan) Haris Rauf	7	8.66

== Players who have played for both teams ==
India had already played international cricket prior to the Partition of India in 1947, having first played as an international team in 1932. Following partition, Pakistan was created and began playing as an independent national team, making their Test match debut in 1952 during a tour of India.

Three players played for Pakistan after appearing for India. They are:

- Amir Elahi – One Test for India against Australia at Sydney in 1947; five Tests for Pakistan against India in 1952
- Gul Mohammad – Eight Tests for India between 1946 and 1955; one Test for Pakistan in 1956
- Abdul Hafeez Kardar – Three Tests for India in 1946; 23 Tests for Pakistan between 1948 and 1958

After partition, Gul Mohammad continued to play for India until 1955 and played against Pakistan in their first tour of India in 1951–52. Both Amir Elahi and Abdul Hafeez Kardar played for Pakistan on the tour. Abdul Hafeez Kardar went on to play for Pakistan against India during India's first tour of Pakistan in 1954–55.

== Public and government reaction to the rivalry ==
Cricket is a significant sport in both countries and matches between them can provoke what has been described as a strong response.

During India's tour of Pakistan in 1989–90, the 3rd ODI in Karachi was abandoned due to crowd disturbance. When Pakistan lost 3 wickets at the score of 28 runs, stone pelting started against Indian fielders, who then gathered near the pitch. Local cricketer Javed Miandad was unable to calm the crowd and the match was abandoned. Chandu Borde said that in the same match, Mohammad Azharuddin was hit with a metal hook. Sanjay Manjrekar wrote in his book that in the first ODI, Indian captain Krishnamachari Srikkanth's shirt was torn by a Pakistani spectator.

There have been examples where fans of the opposing team have experienced legal action. In 2016, a 22-year-old Pakistani fan of Indian captain Virat Kohli, was arrested and later sentenced to 10-years imprisonment for hoisting India's flag in Pakistan after a match between India and Australia.

In the city of Leicester in the United Kingdom, tensions between Indian and Pakistani communities turned into violence and a series of protests following the 2022 Asia Cup match between Pakistan and India on 28 August.

== Cricket diplomacy between India and Pakistan ==
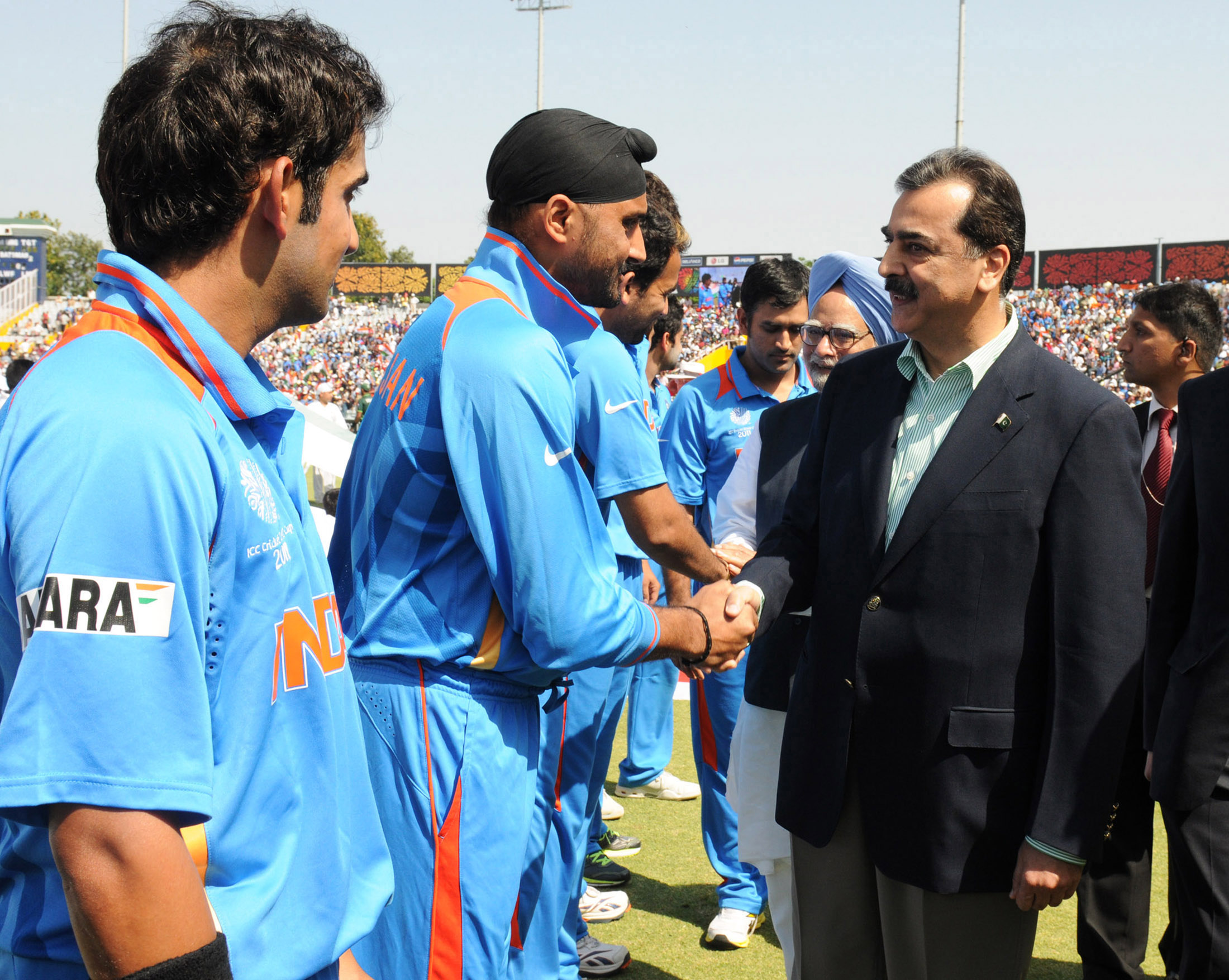

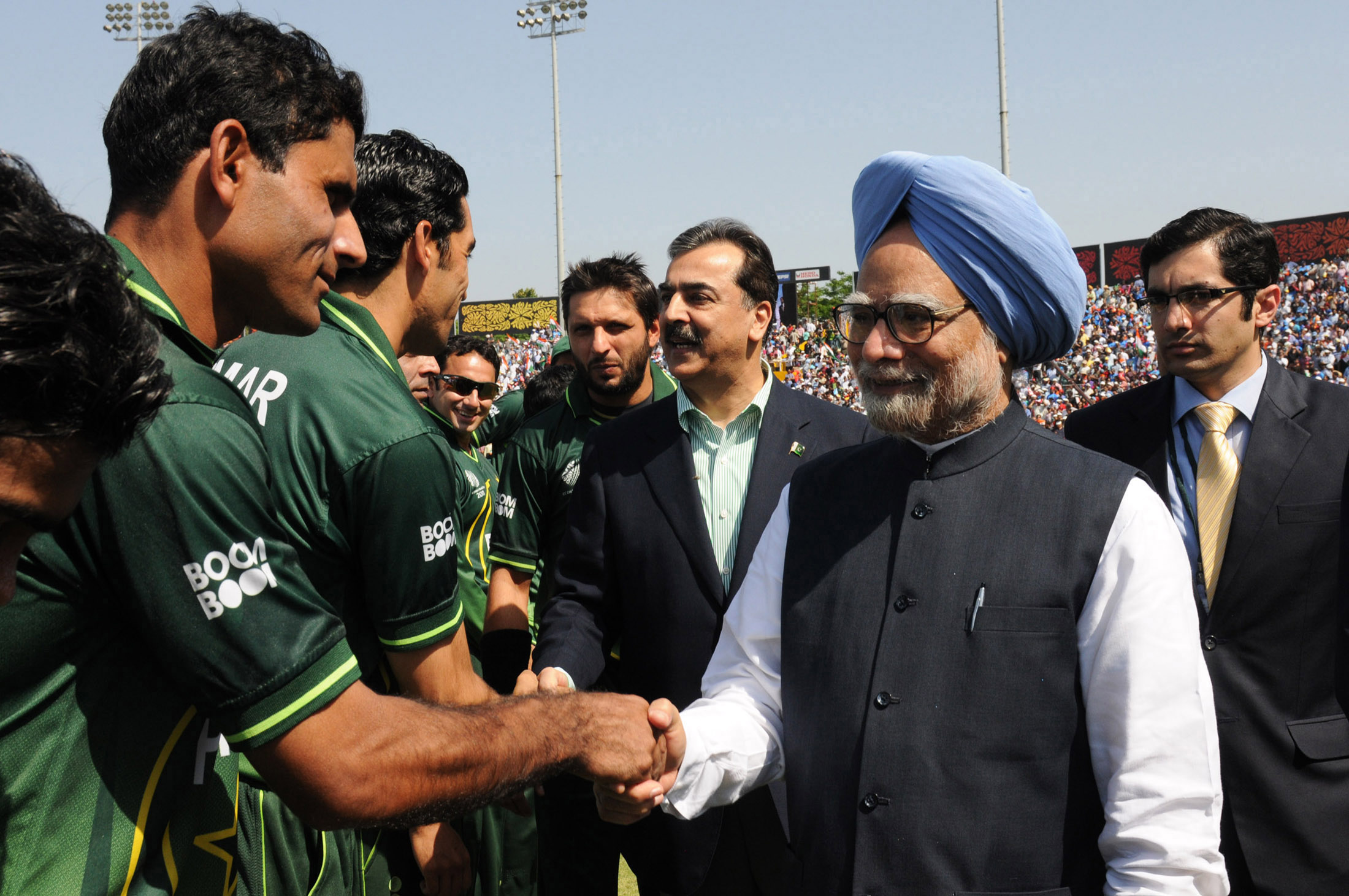
The Prime Minister of India, Manmohan Singh and the Prime Minister of Pakistan, Yousuf Raza Gilani interacting with the Indian Cricket Team and Pakistani Cricket Team ahead of the India vs Pakistan semi-final in the 2011 Cricket World Cup.

Following the Soviet invasion of Afghanistan, and Soviet pressure on India to deflect the tension they faced, in February 1987 Pakistan's president at the time, General Zia ul-Haq, attended a test match between India and Pakistan in Jaipur – a visit that apparently helped cool a flare-up in tensions since it led to a meeting with the Prime Minister of India Rajiv Gandhi. Furthermore, in 2004 after a break of fifteen years, India toured Pakistan in the wake of diplomatic initiatives to bury half a century of mutual hostility. Both teams relaxed their tough visa regulations for each other, allowing thousands of fans to travel across the border.

In an attempt to replicate the cricket diplomacy of the past General Pervez Musharraf came to India in 2005 ostensibly for a cricket match. The trip, however, quickly took on the air of a summit as the teams were urged "to seize a historic chance to end their dispute over Kashmir." Often this rivalry has been tinged with a religious-political bent to it. In 1991, the workers of the Indian political party Shiv Sena dug up the cricket pitch at the Wankhede Stadium in Mumbai on the eve of an India-Pakistan Test match which was to be held there, forcing the entire series between the two nations to be cancelled. The Shiv Sena once again used this unique means of protest at the Feroz Shah Kotla in New Delhi in 2000 to protest against the Pakistan cricket team's proposed visit. Following the Kargil conflict, and at various other times, there have also been calls to suspend cricketing ties between the two countries.

During the 2011 Cricket World Cup, the semi-final match between India and Pakistan seemed to ease the tensions between the two countries, after the polarising 2008 Mumbai attacks. Prime Minister of India Manmohan Singh had used the opportunity to ask his Pakistani counterpart Yousuf Raza Gilani to watch the match with him in Mohali, India. Gilani had subsequently accepted the offer and agreed to travel to India to watch the match with Singh.

== In popular culture ==
The cricket rivalry between India and Pakistan has been portrayed in the Netflix series The Greatest Rivalry: India vs Pakistan. The series features interviews with Virender Sehwag, Sourav Ganguly, Sunil Gavaskar, Shoaib Akhtar, Waqar Younis, and Javed Miandad, among others. It focuses on Pakistan's tour of India in 1999, India's tour of Pakistan in 2004, and the first season of Indian Premier League.

== See also ==
- India at the Cricket World Cup
- Pakistan at the Cricket World Cup
- India–Pakistan sports rivalries
- India–Pakistan relations
- India–Pakistan field hockey rivalry
- India–Australia cricket rivalry
- Bangladesh–India cricket rivalry
