= DLF Cup 2006 =

The DLF Cup 2006 may refer to two different cricket tournaments sponsored by DLF Limited:

- DLF Cup 2005–06, two One-day Internationals held in Abu Dhabi between India and Pakistan in April 2006
- DLF Cup 2006–07, a triangular One-day International tournament in Malaysia between Australia, India and West Indies in September 2006
