= Indian cricket team in Pakistan in 2003–04 =

	India	Pakistan
- Dates: 11 March – 16 April 2004
Captains	Sourav Ganguly (ODIs and 3rd Test); Rahul Dravid (1st and 2nd Tests)	Inzamam-ul-Haq

Test series
- Result: India won the 3-match series 2–1
Most runs	Virender Sehwag (438)	Mohammad Yousuf (280)
Most wickets	Anil Kumble (15)	Danish Kaneria (7)
- Player of the series: Virender Sehwag (Ind)

One Day International series
- Results: India won the 5-match series 3–2
Most runs	Rahul Dravid (248)	Inzamam-ul-Haq (340)
Most wickets	Irfan Pathan (8)	Mohammad Sami (11)
- Player of the series: Inzamam-ul-Haq (Pak)

The Indian national cricket team toured Pakistan during the 2003–04 cricket season to play five One Day International matches and three Test matches against the Pakistan cricket team. The series was called the Samsung Cup for sponsorship reasons. India won the ODI series 3-2 and the Test series 2–1.

== Background ==
It was announced in early January 2004 that India would tour Pakistan in March that year. After India's team management and players expressed security concerns in Pakistan, the Board of Control for Cricket in India sent a three-member team in February to assess the situation and reported that they were "satisfied with the (security) measures being planned by Pakistan". Happy with their report, the Indian government gave a go-ahead to the tour after a few days.

India entered the Test series never having won a Test on Pakistani soil.

== Squads ==
ODIs		Tests	
Pakistan	India	Pakistan	India
Inzamam-ul-Haq (c); Shahid Afridi; Yasir Hameed; Mohammad Yousuf; Younis Khan; Abdul Razzaq; Shoaib Malik; Shoaib Akhtar; Moin Khan (wk); Mohammad Sami; Shoaib Akhtar; Shabbir Ahmed; Saqlain Mushtaq; Naved-ul-Hasan; Taufeeq Umar; Imran Farhat	Sourav Ganguly (c); Rahul Dravid (vc, wk); Virender Sehwag; Sachin Tendulkar; VVS Laxman; Zaheer Khan; Yuvraj Singh; Mohammad Kaif; Ashish Nehra; Lakshmipathy Balaji; Parthiv Patel (wk); Murali Kartik; Irfan Pathan; Ramesh Powar; Hemang Badani; Amit Bhandari	Inzamam-ul-Haq (c); Shabbir Ahmed; Shoaib Akhtar; Imran Farhat; Umar Gul; Yasir Hameed; Asim Kamal; Moin Khan (wk); Danish Kaneria; Shoaib Malik; Saqlain Mushtaq; Abdul Razzaq; Mohammad Sami; Misbah-ul-Haq; Taufeeq Umar; Mohammad Yousuf	Sourav Ganguly (c); Rahul Dravid (vc, wk); Aakash Chopra; Virender Sehwag; Sachin Tendulkar; VVS Laxman; Yuvraj Singh; Parthiv Patel (wk); Anil Kumble; Ajit Agarkar; Zaheer Khan; Irfan Pathan; Ashish Nehra; Lakshmipathy Balaji; Murali Kartik; Ramesh Powar

India's 15-man squad for the Test series was announced on 22 March 2004. Yuvraj Singh, rewarded for his consistent performances in the domestic circuit, and spinner Anil Kumble and medium-pacer Ajit Agarkar, who recovered from injuries, were included. The squad comprised seven batsmen, four medium-pacer and three spinners. The Pakistan Test squad was announced three days later. Batsmen Shahid Afridi and Younis Khan were dropped, and leg-spinner Danish Kaneria was included.

India's captain Sourav Ganguly was ruled out of the side due to an injured back before the First Test. Rahul Dravid, who had previously led India only once, was named the stand-in captain. Ganguly returned for the Third Test as player and captain. Also, Ashish Nehra was brought in the side in Ajit Agarkar's place for that Test.

== Tour match ==
=== Pakistan A v Indians ===
11 March 2004
Scorecard

Indians; 335/6 (50 overs)	v	Pakistan A 336/4 (46 overs)
Rahul Dravid 92* (69); Qaiser Abbas 2/56 (10 overs)		Taufeeq Umar 104 (89); Virender Sehwag 1/22 (5 overs)

Pakistan A won by 6 wickets
Gaddafi Stadium, Lahore
Umpires: Asad Rauf (Pak) and Zameer Haider (Pak)

- Pakistan A won the toss and elected to field.

== ODI series ==
=== 1st ODI ===
13 March 2004
Scorecard

India; 349/7 (50 overs)	v	Pakistan; 344/8 (50 overs)
Rahul Dravid 99 (104); Rana Naved-ul-Hasan 3/73 (10 overs)		Inzamam-ul-Haq 122 (102); Zaheer Khan 3/66 (10 overs)

India won by 5 runs
National Stadium, Karachi
Umpires: Nadeem Ghauri (Pak) and Simon Taufel (Aus)
Player of the match: Inzamam-ul-Haq (Pak)

- India won the toss and elected to bat.

=== 2nd ODI ===
16 March 2004 (D/N)
Scorecard

Pakistan; 329/6 (50 overs)	v	India; 317 (48.4 overs)
Yasir Hameed 86 (108); Ashish Nehra 3/44 (10 overs)		Sachin Tendulkar 141 (135); Mohammad Sami 3/41 (9.4 overs)

Pakistan won by 12 runs
Rawalpindi Cricket Stadium, Rawalpindi
Umpires: Asad Rauf (Pak) and Simon Taufel (Aus)
Player of the match: Sachin Tendulkar (Ind)

- Pakistan won the toss and elected to bat.
- Ramesh Powar made his ODI debut for India.
- Shoaib Akhtar (Pak) played his 100th ODI.
- Sachin Tendulkar (Ind) passed 13,000 runs in ODIs.
- Sachin Tendulkar (Ind) became the first Indian batsman to score an ODI century in Pakistan.

=== 3rd ODI ===
19 March 2004
Scorecard

India; 244/9 (50 overs)	v	Pakistan; 247/6 (47.2 overs)
Yuvraj Singh 65 (76); Shabbir Ahmed 3/33 (10 overs)		Yasir Hameed 98 (116); Irfan Pathan 3/58 (10 overs)

Pakistan won by 4 wickets
Arbab Niaz Stadium, Peshawar
Umpires: Nadeem Ghauri (Pak) and David Shepherd (Eng)
Player of the match: Yasir Hameed (Pak)

- Pakistan won the toss and elected to field.

=== 4th ODI ===
21 March 2004 (D/N)
Scorecard

Pakistan; 293/9 (50 overs)	v	India; 294/5 (45 overs)
Inzamam-ul-Haq 123 (121); Zaheer Khan 2/43 (10 overs)		Rahul Dravid 76* (92); Mohammad Sami 2/50 (10 overs)

India won by 5 wickets
Gaddafi Stadium, Lahore
Umpires: Asad Rauf (Pak) and Simon Taufel (Aus)
Player of the match: Inzamam-ul-Haq (Pak)

- Pakistan won the toss and elected to bat.

=== 5th ODI ===
24 March 2004 (D/N)
Scorecard

India; 293/7 (50 overs)	v	Pakistan; 253 (47.5 overs)
V. V. S. Laxman 107 (104); Mohammad Sami 3/63 (10 overs)		Moin Khan 72 (71); Irfan Pathan 3/32 (10 overs)

India won by 40 runs
Gaddafi Stadium, Lahore
Umpires: Nadeem Ghauri (Pak) and David Shepherd (Eng)
Player of the match: V. V. S. Laxman (Ind)

- Pakistan won the toss and elected to field.

== Test series ==
=== 1st Test ===
28 March–1 April 2004
Scorecard

India	v	Pakistan
675/5d (161.5 overs); Virender Sehwag 309 (375); Mohammad Sami 2/110 (34 overs)		407 (126.3 overs); Yasir Hameed 91 (151); Irfan Pathan 4/100 (28 overs)
		216 f/o (77 overs); Mohammad Yousuf 112 (164); Anil Kumble 6/72 (30 overs)

India won by an innings and 52 runs
Multan Cricket Stadium, Multan
Umpires: David Shepherd (Eng) and Simon Taufel (Aus)
Player of the match: Virender Sehwag (Ind)

- India won the toss and decided to bat.
- Virender Sehwag (Ind) became the first batsman for India to score a triple century in Tests. It was also the second fastest in Tests, in terms of balls faced (364).
- This was India's first Test win on Pakistani soil.

=== 2nd Test ===
5–8 April 2004
Scorecard

India	v	Pakistan
287 (64.1 overs); Yuvraj Singh 112 (129); Umar Gul 5/31 (12 overs)		489 (160.1 overs); Inzamam-ul-Haq 118 (243); Lakshmipathy Balaji 3/81 (33 overs)
241 (62.4 overs); Virender Sehwag 90 (134); Danish Kaneria 3/14 (6.4 overs)		40/1 (7 overs); Yasir Hameed 16* (12); Lakshmipathy Balaji 1/15 (3 overs)

Pakistan won by 9 wickets
Gaddafi Stadium, Lahore
Umpires: Steve Bucknor (WI) and Simon Taufel (Aus)
Player of the match: Umar Gul (Pak)

- India won the toss and decided to bat.
- Yuvraj Singh (Ind) scored his first century in Tests.

=== 3rd Test ===
13–16 April 2004
Scorecard

Pakistan	v	India
224 (72.5 overs); Mohammad Sami 49 (122); Lakshmipathy Balaji 4/63 (19 overs)		600 (177.2 overs); Rahul Dravid 270 (495); Shoaib Akhtar 3/47 (21.2 overs)
245 (54 overs); Asim Kamal 60 (90); Anil Kumble 4/47 (8 overs)

India won by an innings and 131 runs
Rawalpindi Cricket Stadium, Rawalpindi
Umpires: Rudi Koertzen (RSA) and David Shepherd (Eng)
Player of the match: Rahul Dravid (Ind)

- India won the toss and decided to field.
- Rahul Dravid (Ind) faced 495 balls for his 270 runs, the most deliveries faced by an Indian batsmen in a Test innings, beaten in 2017 by Cheteshwar Pujara (525 balls).
- Sourav Ganguly broke Mohammad Azharuddin's record for most wins as India captain in Tests (15). The record was subsequently broken by MS Dhoni and Virat Kohli respectively.

== In popular culture ==
This series is the subject of the Netflix documentary The Greatest Rivalry: India vs Pakistan.
