= Nassau County International Cricket Stadium =

Temporary cricket venue in East Meadow, New York

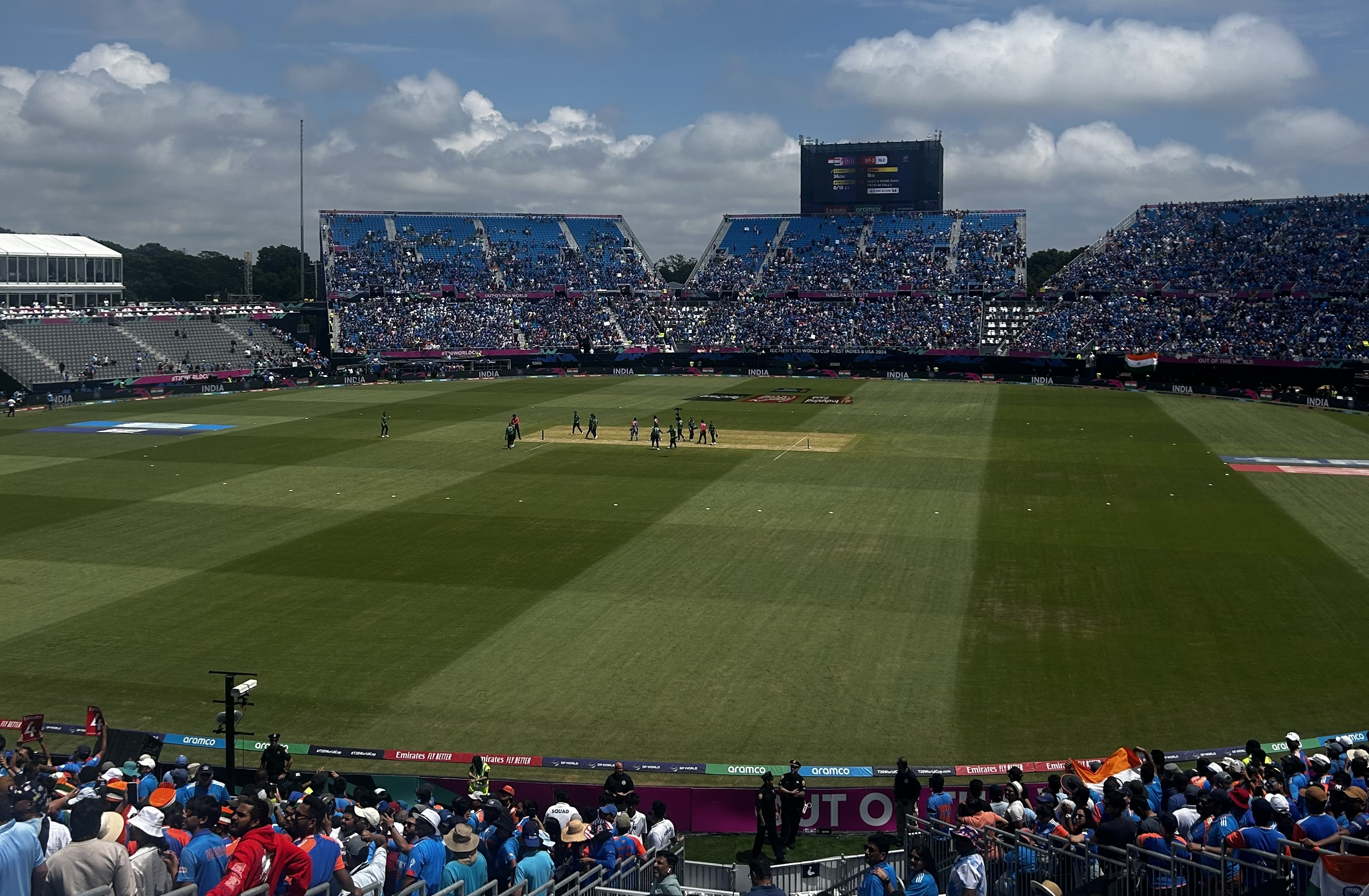
- During the 2024 ICC Men's T20 World Cup
- Interactive map of Nassau County International Cricket Stadium
- Address: 1899 Park Boulevard; East Meadow, New York 11554; U.S.
- Coordinates: 40°43′48″N 73°34′31″W
- Owner: International Cricket Council
- Operator: T20 World Cup USA, Inc.
- Seating type: Stadium seating
- Capacity: 34,000
- Surface: Kentucky bluegrass
- Public transit: Westbury; NICE: n70 (Hempstead Tpke at East Meadow Plaza)

Construction
- Opened: June 1, 2024
- Closed: June 12, 2024
- Architect: Populous
- Builders: Arena Event Services; The LandTek Group

Ground information
- Establishment: 2024
- Tenants: 2024 ICC Men's T20 World Cup
- End names
- Sir Sam Clark End; Charlie Whitaker End

International information
- First men's T20I: June 3, 2024: Sri Lanka v South Africa
- Last men's T20I: June 12, 2024: United States v India
- As of June 11, 2024; Source: Cricinfo

Nassau County International Cricket Stadium was a temporary cricket stadium that was built on the grounds of Eisenhower Park within the hamlet of East Meadow, in Nassau County on Long Island, in New York, United States.

It was a modular stadium which served as a temporary venue for the 2024 ICC Men's T20 World Cup, during which it hosted eight group stage matches — including, most prominently, the India–Pakistan match. Following the matches, the modular architecture was dismantled while leaving the outfield intact as a legacy, and its natural grass drop-in pitch replaced by artificial turf. The venue was overseen by T20 World Cup USA — the host committee representing matches hosted in the United States during the tournament; it marked the first temporary venue ever used in an ICC World Cup tournament.

The stadium received mixed reviews from players during its initial matches, who noted its slow outfield, and an uneven pitch that impacted ball behavior. Work was done to smoothen the pitch for subsequent matches.

== Background ==
In November 2021, the International Cricket Council (ICC) announced that the 2024 ICC Men's T20 World Cup would be played in the West Indies and the United States. A joint bid was submitted by Cricket West Indies and USA Cricket following two years of preparation, forming part of a strategic partnership between the two associations.

In July 2023, the ICC shortlisted four venues in the United States, which included Lauderhill, Florida (Central Broward Park), Morrisville, North Carolina (Church Street Park), Grand Prairie, Texas (Grand Prairie Stadium), and a temporary stadium at Van Cortlandt Park in the Bronx, New York City. The proposed site was criticized by Bronx residents; a group known as the Van Cortlandt Park Alliance cited potential ecological impact, and concerns over the tournament preventing public access to the park for an extended period. With the final announcement of the U.S. host cities on September 22, 2023, the ICC relocated the temporary New York stadium to Eisenhower Park in East Meadow, New York, located in Nassau County on Long Island.

The need for a temporary stadium was necessitated by the relative lack of cricket stadiums in the United States, itself a byproduct of cricket usually being categorized as a niche, international sport by American audiences. Its most loyal fanbases in the United States come from the diaspora of regions — particularly South Asia — where the sport is mainstream. A domestic T20 league — Major League Cricket — held its inaugural season in 2023. Nassau County would receive an estimated US$2.7 million in direct revenue from the tournament, which would leave the Eisenhower Park with a legacy of permanent improvements to host large cricket tournaments henceforth.

The New York metropolitan area — the United States' most populous region — is home of the largest metropolitan Indian population outside of Asia. The Nassau County hamlet of Hicksville, New York also has a significant and rapidly growing South Asian population, and has been described as a "hub" of the region's Indian-American community. Among the matches that were hosted by the stadium was the group stage match between India and Pakistan, one of the most significant international rivalries in cricket. The stadium was the first temporary venue to have ever been used in an ICC World Cup.

== Design and construction ==
The stadium's design was unveiled by the ICC and Nassau County Executive Bruce Blakeman on January 17, 2024, with construction beginning that week. Designed by Populous, the 34,000-seat stadium utilized a modular architecture constructed by Arena Event Services, including grandstands, facilities for players and the media, and hospitality boxes. Its grandstands had previously been deployed for events such as golf tournaments and Formula One's Las Vegas Grand Prix.

The stadium's outfield, drainage, and pitch construction were overseen by The LandTek Group—a company that has worked on playing surfaces for New York's two Major League Baseball stadiums Citi Field and Yankee Stadium, and various NFL stadiums. The outfield used Kentucky bluegrass, and the drop-in pitch used Tahoma bermudagrass surfaces prepared in Florida by LandTek subsidiary LTG Sports Turf One, in consultation with the Adelaide Oval's head groundskeeper Damian Hough.

The pitches posed particular challenges due to the limited timeframe, and the logistical aspects of the construction process; only six of the ten trays were shipped from Adelaide, necessitating that the remainder be built locally. The grass had to be grown in Florida's warmer climate due to New York's cold winter, and the pitches had to be transported by semi-trailers with blankets to protect the grass and soil from wind and the different climate conditions along the East Coast. Hough remarked that "I've never moved a pitch further than from Adelaide Oval to Karen Rolton Oval, so moving them for two days on a fleet of semi-trailers certainly throws up a few different issues."

By late-April 2024, the outfield grass had been laid, preparations were being made for the installation of the turf, and most of the grandstands had been installed. The stadium was inaugurated by Jamaican sprinter and tournament ambassador Usain Bolt on May 15; as test events, the stadium hosted "community cricket events" in late-May 2024, followed by a pre-tournament warmup match between Bangladesh and India on June 1. It hosted its first tournament match on June 3, between South Africa and Sri Lanka. The stands and modular infrastructure were dismantled after its final match on June 12, 2024; the cricket ground remains intact, but the drop-in pitch was replaced by artificial turf to ease maintenance.

Despite the short turnaround time between completion and its first match, ICC head of events Chris Tetley stated that he was confident in the project due to his trust in the companies involved, and that warm-up events would allow the organizers to "know from an operational perspective how all of the functional teams that will come together to run the stadium need to interact on an event day with people coming through the turnstiles." ESPNcricinfo observed that the Nassau County stadium would be the first venue to have ever hosted an ICC event without having previously hosted an international match beforehand.

=== Field conditions ===
Following the South Africa – Sri Lanka match, pundits and former players perceived the pitch to have been uneven with inconsistent and high bounce, and that the thick outfield grass was slowing the balls; the match was a low-scoring affair which saw Sri Lanka post their lowest-ever total in a T20I, and the lowest combined run rate of any Men's T20 World Cup match. In posts on social media, former India player Irfan Pathan described the pitch as being "not ideal" for Twenty20, while former SA captain Faf du Plessis described it as being "spicy".

South Africa bowler Anrich Nortje stated in a post-match press conference that the balls were a bit "up and down", but that he enjoyed the atmosphere, felt that a game did not always need to have a high run total in order to be "entertaining", and suggested that the outfield could flatten out more over the course of subsequent matches. Following further criticism after the Ireland – India match, the ICC acknowledged the inconsistency of the pitches, and stated that the stadium's crew was working to "remedy the situation and deliver the best possible surfaces for the remaining matches".

Hough noted that grass had been growing in some of the cracks in the pitches' clay, while the overcast conditions during the South Africa – Sri Lanka match also influenced the behavior. On subsequent matches, topsoil was used to fill in the cracks in the clay, and the surfaces were smoothened; Ireland captain Paul Stirling noted that the pitch felt completely different during their match against Canada in comparison to their previous match, and had a less grassy appearance.

== 2024 ICC Men's T20 World Cup matches ==
June 3, 2024
10:30 UTC−4
Scorecard

Sri Lanka; 77 (19.1 overs)	v	South Africa; 80/4 (16.2 overs)
Kusal Mendis 19 (30); Anrich Nortje 4/7 (4 overs)		Quinton de Kock 20 (27); Wanindu Hasaranga 2/22 (3.2 overs)

South Africa won by 6 wickets
Nassau County International Cricket Stadium, East Meadow, New York
Umpires: Chris Brown (NZ) and Richard Kettleborough (Eng)
Player of the match: Anrich Nortje (SA)

- Sri Lanka won the toss and elected to bat.
- This was Sri Lanka's lowest total in T20Is.

June 5, 2024
10:30 UTC−4
Scorecard

Ireland; 96 (16 overs)	v	India; 97/2 (12.2 overs)
Gareth Delany 26 (14); Hardik Pandya 3/27 (4 overs)		Rohit Sharma 52* (37); Ben White 1/6 (1 over)

India won by 8 wickets
Nassau County International Cricket Stadium, East Meadow, New York
Umpires: Chris Gaffaney (NZ) and Alex Wharf (Eng)
Player of the match: Jasprit Bumrah (Ind)

- India won the toss and elected to field.
- Rohit Sharma (Ind) scored his 4,000th run in T20Is and 1,000th run in the T20 World Cup, becoming the second Indian to achieve both feats after Virat Kohli. He also completed 600 sixes in international cricket, 100 sixes in ICC tournaments and 300 wins in international cricket.
- Rishabh Pant (Ind) scored his 1,000th run in T20Is.

June 7, 2024
10:30 UTC−4
Scorecard

Canada; 137/7 (20 overs)	v	Ireland; 125/7 (20 overs)
Nicholas Kirton 49 (35); Barry McCarthy 2/24 (4 overs)		Mark Adair 34 (24); Jeremy Gordon 2/16 (4 overs)

Canada won by 12 runs
Nassau County International Cricket Stadium, East Meadow, New York
Umpires: Richard Kettleborough (Eng) and Sam Nogajski (Aus)
Player of the match: Nicholas Kirton (Can)

- Ireland won the toss and elected to field.
- This was Canada's first ever victory at a T20 World Cup.

June 8, 2024
10:30 UTC−4
Scorecard

Netherlands; 103/9 (20 overs)	v	South Africa; 106/6 (18.5 overs)
Sybrand Engelbrecht 40 (45); Ottniel Baartman 4/11 (4 overs)		David Miller 59* (51); Vivian Kingma 2/12 (4 overs)

South Africa won by 4 wickets
Nassau County International Cricket Stadium, East Meadow, New York
Umpires: Chris Gaffaney (NZ) and Sharfuddoula (Ban)
Player of the match: David Miller (SA)

- South Africa won the toss and elected to field.

June 9, 2024
10:30 UTC−4
Scorecard

India; 119 (19 overs)	v	Pakistan; 113/7 (20 overs)
Rishabh Pant 42 (31); Naseem Shah 3/21 (4 overs)		Mohammad Rizwan 31 (44); Jasprit Bumrah 3/14 (4 overs)

India won by 6 runs
Nassau County International Cricket Stadium, East Meadow, New York
Umpires: Richard Illingworth (Eng) and Rod Tucker (Aus)
Player of the match: Jasprit Bumrah (Ind)

- Pakistan won the toss and elected to field.
- Mohammad Rizwan (Pak) played in his 100th T20I match.
- The match attendance for the game was 34,028, which is the largest turnout for a cricket game in the United States.

June 10, 2024
10:30 UTC−4
Scorecard

South Africa; 113/6 (20 overs)	v	Bangladesh; 109/7 (20 overs)
Heinrich Klaasen 46 (44); Tanzim Hasan Sakib 3/18 (4 overs)		Towhid Hridoy 37 (34); Keshav Maharaj 3/27 (4 overs)

South Africa won by 4 runs
Nassau County International Cricket Stadium, East Meadow, New York
Umpires: Richard Illingworth (Eng) and Sam Nogajski (Aus)
Player of the match: Heinrich Klaasen (SA)

- South Africa won the toss and elected to bat.

June 11, 2024
10:30 UTC−4
Scorecard

Canada; 106/7 (20 overs)	v	Pakistan; 107/3 (17.3 overs)
Aaron Johnson 52 (44); Mohammad Amir 2/13 (4 overs)		Mohammad Rizwan 53* (53); Dillon Heyliger 2/18 (4 overs)

Pakistan won by 7 wickets
Nassau County International Cricket Stadium, East Meadow, New York
Umpires: Kumar Dharmasena (SL) and Adrian Holdstock (SA)
Player of the match: Mohammad Amir (Pak)

- Pakistan won the toss and elected to field.
- Haris Rauf (Pak) took his 100th wicket in T20Is.

June 12, 2024
10:30 UTC−4
Scorecard

United States; 110/8 (20 overs)	v	India; 111/3 (18.2 overs)
Nitish Kumar 27 (23); Arshdeep Singh 4/9 (4 overs)		Suryakumar Yadav 50* (49); Saurabh Netravalkar 2/18 (4 overs)

India won by 7 wickets
Nassau County International Cricket Stadium, East Meadow, New York
Umpires: Sam Nogajski (Aus) and Paul Reiffel (Aus)
Player of the match: Arshdeep Singh (Ind)

- India won the toss and elected to field.
- India qualified for the Super 8 as a result of this match.
- This was the last ever match on this ground.
