= Pakistani cricket team in India in 2007–08 =

International cricket tour

	Pakistan	India
- Dates: 2 November – 12 December 2007
Captains	Shoaib Malik; Younus Khan (3rd Test)	Anil Kumble (Tests); MS Dhoni (ODIs)

Test series
- Result: India won the 3-match series 1–0
Most runs	Misbah-ul-Haq (464)	Sourav Ganguly (534)
Most wickets	Danish Kaneria (12)	Anil Kumble (18)
- Player of the series: Sourav Ganguly (Ind)

One Day International series
- Results: India won the 5-match series 3–2
Most runs	Mohammad Yousuf (283)	Yuvraj Singh (272)
Most wickets	Sohail Tanvir (8)	RP Singh (6)
- Player of the series: Yuvraj Singh (Ind)

The Pakistan national cricket team toured India in November 2007 and played five ODIs and three Test matches between 6 November and 12 December. India won the ODI series by a 3–2 margin and the Test series by a 1–0 margin.

== Background ==
The tour schedule was released in mid June 2007. It was announced that the Pakistan squad would arrive on 2 November and would play five ODIs followed by three Tests, the tour that would follow Australia's India tour for seven ODIs. In mid October 2007, the first three ODIs were rescheduled in that it was announced that they would be played a day each in advance, in order to accommodate the third ODI on a Sunday.

This was the fourth tour combined between the two countries in as many years. Pakistan came to India on the back of a superior record against the Indian side in both Tests and ODIs. In Tests they had a 12–8 record in their favour, while in ODIs from 1978 till the start of this series, they had won 62 per cent of the games, with the figure dropping to 57 after 2000. India also had a poor home record in ODIs against Pakistan having won six matches and lost 15 leading up to the series.

Issam Ahmed of the Telegraph felt that on the backdrop of the declaration of emergency in Pakistan and the Pakistan team's "disappointing" performance at home against South Africa, "enthusiasm on the street seems pretty hard to come by". The same state was echoed in India by The Hindu which dubbed this Pakistan team the "weakest ... to tour India" while adding that despite the "number of young players with proven ability [it] lacks names that inspire awe". It also attributed this to "playing each other every year, due to which the novelty of watching the two neighbours slug it out has waned" and that the "intensity ... has ... reduced". However, Pakistan's coach Geoff Lawson called the series "bigger than the Ashes".

This was the last bilateral test series played between India and Pakistan. However, following the November 2008 terror attacks in Mumbai, India suspended the planned 2009 series, and all future engagements against Pakistan. Due to the geopolitical and diplomatic tensions caused by the aftermath of the attack, India has refused to play any form of series against Pakistan since then.

== Squads ==
ODIs		Tests	
India	Pakistan	India	Pakistan
Mahendra Singh Dhoni (c, wk); Sourav Ganguly; Gautam Gambhir; Murali Kartik; Zaheer Khan; Praveen Kumar; Irfan Pathan; Virender Sehwag; Rohit Sharma; Harbhajan Singh; R. P. Singh; Yuvraj Singh; S. Sreesanth; Sachin Tendulkar; Robin Uthappa	Shoaib Malik (c); Shahid Afridi; Shoaib Akhtar; Kamran Akmal (wk); Fawad Alam; Iftikhar Anjum; ~~Mohammad Asif~~; Salman Butt; Umar Gul; Yasir Hameed; Younis Khan; Imran Nazir; Abdur Rehman; Sohail Tanvir; Misbah-ul-Haq; Mohammad Yousuf	Anil Kumble (c); Rahul Dravid; Mahendra Singh Dhoni (wk); Gautam Gambhir; Sourav Ganguly; Wasim Jaffer; Dinesh Karthik (wk); Murali Kartik; Zaheer Khan; V. V. S. Laxman; Munaf Patel; Irfan Pathan; Ishant Sharma; Harbhajan Singh; R. P. Singh; V. R. V. Singh; Yuvraj Singh; S. Sreesanth; Sachin Tendulkar	Shoaib Malik (c); Shoaib Akhtar; Kamran Akmal (wk); Sarfraz Ahmed (wk); Iftikhar Anjum; Yasir Arafat; Salman Butt; Umar Gul; Yasir Hameed; Rao Iftikhar; Faisal Iqbal; Danish Kaneria; Younis Khan; Abdur Rehman; Mohammad Sami; Sohail Tanvir; Misbah-ul-Haq; Mohammad Yousuf

A 16-member Pakistan ODI squad was named on 26 October 2007. Shoaib Akhtar who had served a ban that followed an altercation with a teammate was included in the side. From the team that played South Africa at home, Mohammad Hafeez and Khalid Latif were dropped. Younus Khan was appointed as their vice-captain. Mohammad Asif was ruled out initially for the first three ODIs, and later the subsequent ODIs and the Test series due to an elbow injury, before being replaced by Mohammad Sami leading into the Test series. India announced their squad for the first two ODIs 27 October. Rahul Dravid and Dinesh Karthik were dropped following inconsistent performances in the preceding series and were replaced by Virender Sehwag and Gautam Gambhir, with Praveen Kumar as the only new inclusion in the squad. An unchanged side announced for the next two ODIs.

Bowler Anil Kumble was named India's Test captain for the series. A 14-member squad was announced on 14 November for the first two Tests; Gautam Gambhir, Virender Sehwag and Irfan Pathan made way for spinners Harbhajan Singh and Murali Kartik. After S. Sreesanth and R. P. Singh were ruled out of the First Test owing to shoulder injury and an oblique abdominal strain respectively, Ishant Sharma and Munaf Patel, the latter recovering from injury himself, were drafted into the squad. After they lost Zaheer Khan to injury after the Second Test, India called in Irfan Pathan and V. R. V. Singh to their side for the Third. Pakistan named the same side for the Test series that played the ODIs. After Umar Gul was returned home following an injury sustained in the First Test, all-rounder Yasir Arafat was named as his replacement. Captain Shoaib Malik was ruled out of the Third Test upon failing a fitness test following an injury he suffered in the First Test. Subsequently, Younus Khan was asked to lead the side.

== Tour match ==
2 November 2007
09:00
Scorecard

Delhi; 213/9 (50 overs)	v	Pakistan; 215/3 (42.4 overs)
Rajat Bhatia 75 (107); Younis Khan 2/25 (6 overs)		Salman Butt 83 (84); Amit Bhandari 1/25 (7 overs)

Pakistan won by 7 wickets
Feroz Shah Kotla, Delhi
Umpires: Anil Dandekar and R. Radhakrishnan
Player of the match: Salman Butt (Pakistan)

- Pakistan won the toss and elected to field.
- 14 players per side (11 batting, 11 fielding)

After putting in Delhi to bat first in a pitch that assisted swing, Pakistan picked quick wickets reducing the hosts to 46/4. A 91-run stand between Shikhar Dhawan and Rajat Bhatia then followed before a lower order collapse took Delhi's score to 213 after 50 overs. In reply, Imran Nazir slammed 34 from 22 balls before he was removed by Amit Bhandari. Salman Butt and Misbah-ul-Haq (39) then put together a 116-run stand, with the former retiring hurt after brisk 83 off 84 balls. Subsequently, Yasir Hameed took the team home while remaining unbeaten on 33.

== ODI series ==
=== 1st ODI ===
5 November
08:30 IST
Scorecard

Pakistan; 239/7 (50 overs)	v	India; 242/5 (47 overs)
Mohammad Yousuf 82* (88); Sachin Tendulkar 2/33 (5 overs)		Mahendra Singh Dhoni 63 (77); Shoaib Akhtar 2/52 (8 overs)

India won by 5 wickets
Nehru Stadium, Guwahati
Umpires: Ian Gould (Eng) and Amiesh Saheba (Ind)
Player of the match: Mahendra Singh Dhoni (Ind)

- Pakistan won the toss and elected to bat.
- Mohammad Yousuf (Pak) became the eighth Pakistan player to aggregate 1,000 runs against India in ODIs.

=== 2nd ODI ===
8 November
Scorecard

India; 321/9 (50 overs)	v	Pakistan; 322/6 (49.5 overs)
Sachin Tendulkar 99 (91); Shoaib Akhtar 3/42 (10 overs)		Younus Khan 117 (110); R. P. Singh 2/59 (10 overs)

Pakistan won by 4 wickets
Punjab Cricket Association Stadium, Mohali
Umpires: Ian Gould (Eng) and Suresh Shastri (Ind)
Player of the match: Younis Khan (Pak)

- India won the toss and elected to bat.
- Pakistan's 322 was their highest total in a successful chase, before it was surpassed in 2014 when they made 329 against Bangladesh.

=== 3rd ODI ===
11 November
Scorecard

India; 294/6 (50 overs)	v	Pakistan; 248 (47.2 overs)
Yuvraj Singh 77 (95); Sohail Tanvir 2/26 (10 overs)		Salman Butt 129 (142); R. P. Singh 3/62 (8 overs)

India won by 46 runs
Green Park Stadium, Kanpur
Umpires: Ian Gould (Eng) and Amiesh Saheba (Ind)
Player of the match: Yuvraj Singh (Ind)

- Pakistan won the toss and elected to field.
- MS Dhoni (Ind) became the third wicketkeeper-batsman to score more than 1,000 ODI runs in a year.

=== 4th ODI ===
15 November
Scorecard

Pakistan; 255/6 (50 overs)	v	India; 260/4 (46.3 overs)
Mohammad Yousuf 99* (104); Zaheer Khan 2/40 (10)		Sachin Tendulkar 97 (102); Umar Gul 1/42 (8)

India won by 6 wickets
Captain Roop Singh Stadium, Gwalior
Umpires: Billy Doctrove (WI) and Amiesh Saheba (Ind)
Player of the match: Sachin Tendulkar (Ind)

- Pakistan won the toss and elected to bat.
- Sourav Ganguly (Ind) picked his 100th wicket in ODIs and became the third player to complete 10,000 runs, 100 wickets and 100 catches in ODIs.
- Zaheer Khan (Ind) picked his 200th wicket in ODIs.
- Sourav Ganguly played his last ODI match.

=== 5th ODI ===
18 November
Scorecard

Pakistan; 306/6 (50 overs)	v	India; 275 (49.5 overs)
Shoaib Malik 89 (82); S. Sreesanth 3/52 (10 overs)		Rohit Sharma 52 (61); Sohail Tanvir 4/53 (9.5 overs)

Pakistan won by 31 runs
Sawai Mansingh Stadium, Jaipur
Umpires: Billy Doctrove (WI) and Suresh Shastri (Ind)
Player of the match: Shoaib Malik (Pak)

- India won the toss and elected to field.
- Praveen Kumar (Ind) and Sarfraz Ahmed (Pak) made their ODI debut.
- Mohammad Yousuf and Shoaib Malik (Pak) put together 168 runs, Pakistan's highest against India for the fourth wicket.
- Murli Kartik played his last ODI match

== Test series ==
=== 1st Test ===
22–26 November
Scorecard

Pakistan	v	India
231 (96.2 overs); Misbah-ul-Haq 82 (243); Anil Kumble 4/38 (21.2 overs)		276 (78.4 overs); VVS Laxman 72* (135); Danish Kaneria 4/59 (21.4 overs)
247 (83.1 overs); Salman Butt 67 (140); Anil Kumble 3/68 (27.1 overs)		203/4 (61.1 overs); Sachin Tendulkar 56* (110); Shoaib Akhtar 4/58 (18.1 overs)

India won by 6 wickets
Feroz Shah Kotla, Delhi
Umpires: Billy Doctrove (WI) and Simon Taufel (Aus)
Player of the match: Anil Kumble (Ind)

- Bad light ended play on days 1 and 4 before scheduled time.
- Sohail Tanvir (Pak) made his Test debut .
- Sachin Tendulkar (Ind) surpassed Allan Border's aggregate of 11,174 runs to become the second-highest run-scorer in Tests. He became only the third Indian, after Sunil Gavaskar and Rahul Dravid, to aggregate 1,000 runs in the fourth innings of Tests.

=== 2nd Test ===
30 November–4 December
Scorecard

India	v	Pakistan
616/5d (152.5 overs); Wasim Jaffer 202 (274); Sohail Tanvir 2/166 (39 overs)		456 (151.1 overs); Misbah-ul-Haq 161* (351); Harbhajan Singh 5/122 (47 overs)
184/4d (42.4 overs); Wasim Jaffer 56 (75); Shoaib Akhtar 2/46 (12.4 overs)		214/4 (77 overs); Younus Khan 107* (211); Anil Kumble 2/73 (25 overs)

Match drawn
Eden Gardens, Kolkata
Umpires: Billy Doctrove (WI) and Rudi Koertzen (SA)
Player of the match: Wasim Jaffer (Ind)

- Bad light ended play before scheduled time on days 1, 2 and 4.

=== 3rd Test ===
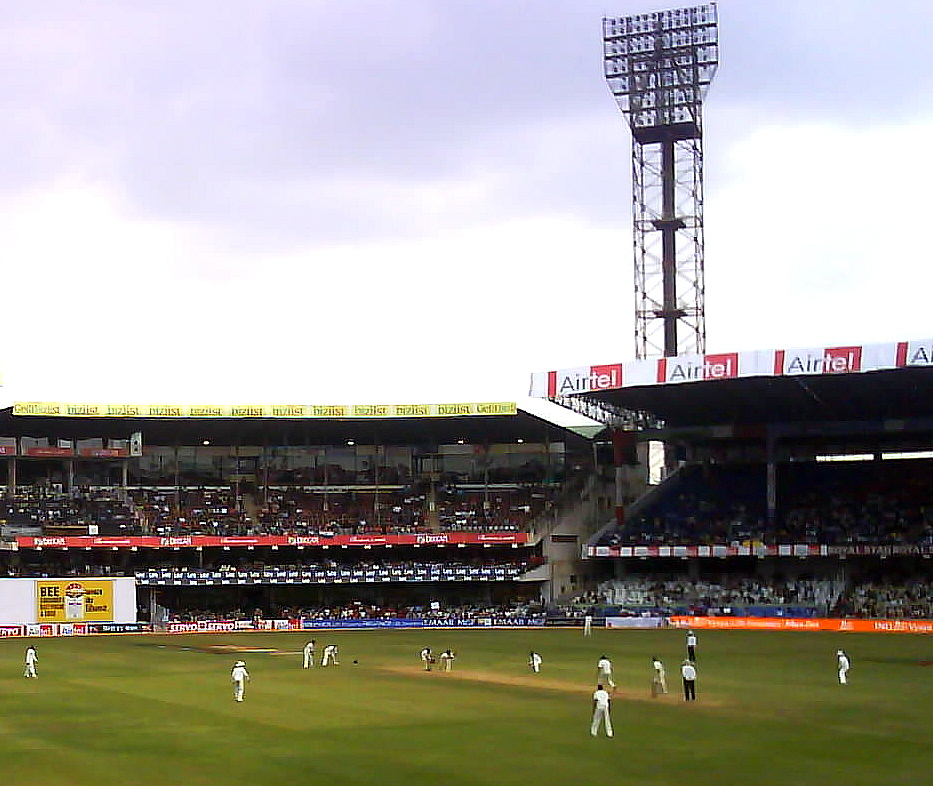
Play from the third Test Match meeting between India and Pakistan, Banglore, December 2007

8–12 December
Scorecard

India	v	Pakistan
626 (150.2 overs); Sourav Ganguly 239 (361); Yasir Arafat 5/161 (39 overs)		537 (168.1 overs); Misbah-ul-Haq 133* (322); Ishant Sharma 5/118 (33.1 overs)
284/6d (76.3 overs); Sourav Ganguly 91 (134); Yasir Arafat 2/49 (13.3 overs)		162/7 (36 overs); Faisal Iqbal 51 (54); Anil Kumble 5/60 (14 overs)

Match drawn
M. Chinnaswamy Stadium, Bangalore
Umpires: Rudi Koertzen (SA) and Simon Taufel (Aus)
Player of the match: Sourav Ganguly (Ind)

- Yasir Arafat (Pak) made his Test debut.
- Ranjan Madugalle (SL) refereed his 100th Test.
- Sourav Ganguly (Ind) scored his first double century in Tests. His 239 in the first innings was the highest by an India left-handed player surpassing Vinod Kambli's 227. Irfan Pathans first century
- Yasir Arafat became the eighth Pakistan bowler to pick a five-wicket haul on Test debut.
- Salman Butt (Pak) reached 1,000 runs in Tests.
- Mohammad Yousuf and Younis Khan surpassed the pair of Yousuf and Inzamam-ul-Haq for most runs scored while batting together in Tests (3,080), before it was broken by the pair of Khan and Misbah-ul-Haq in 2016. They also surpassed Gordon Greenidge and Desmond Haynes (WI) for most runs scored together while batting against India.
- India conceded 76 extras in Pakistan's first innings, the highest in a Test; it included 35 byes, the second highest.
- Shoaib Akhtar (Pak) played his last test match.
- As of 2025, this has been the last test match played between the two nations.

== Broadcast ==
India's public service broadcaster Prasar Bharati bought the broadcasting rights of the entire series, both ODIs and Tests, in Doordarshan for ₹81.25 crore. It also bought rights for radio commentary for US$10,000 for each ODI and Test.
