= 2006–07 DLF Cup =

DLF Cup 2006/07
- Date: 12 – 24 September 2006
- Location: Kuala Lumpur, Malaysia
- Result: Won by Australia
- Player of the series: (Australia) Brett Lee
Teams
Australia	India	West Indies
Captains
(Australia) Ricky Ponting	(India) Rahul Dravid	(Cricket West Indies) Brian Lara
Most runs
(Australia) Brad Haddin (174)	(India) Sachin Tendulkar (222)	(Cricket West Indies) Chris Gayle (183)
Most wickets
(Australia) Brett Lee (12)	(India) Munaf Patel (7)	(Cricket West Indies) Jerome Taylor (8)

The DLF Cup 2006–07 (named after sponsor DLF) was a triangular One Day International cricket tournament involving Australia, India, and West Indies. Australia defeated West Indies by 127 runs in the final to lift the trophy, winning three of their five games in the tournament.

Australian bowler Brett Lee was declared Player of the Series for his outstanding contribution with the ball.

All the games were played at the Kinrara Academy Oval in Kuala Lumpur, Malaysia between 12 and 24 September 2006.

== Tournament Structure ==
The sides played each other in a double round robin, meaning that each side played four matches, for a total of six matches. Australia and West Indies, the top 2 teams at the end of the round-robin stage played each other in a one-off final, which was played on 24 September 2006.

== Schedule ==
No.	Date	Team 1	Team 2	Venue
1	12 September	AUS	WI	Kinrara Academy Oval
2	14 September	IND	WI	Kinrara Academy Oval
3	16 September	AUS	IND	Kinrara Academy Oval
4	18 September	AUS	WI	Kinrara Academy Oval
5	20 September	IND	WI	Kinrara Academy Oval
6	22 September	AUS	IND	Kinrara Academy Oval
Final	24 September	AUS	WI	Kinrara Academy Oval

== Group Stage Table ==
DLF Cup 2006 - 07
Pos	Team	Pld	W	NR	L	BP	Pts	NRR
1	Australia	4	2	1	1	1	11	+0.553
2	West Indies	4	2	–	2	1	9	-0.305
3	India	4	1	1	2	–	6	-0.258

== Squads ==
Australia	India	West Indies
Ricky Ponting (c); Michael Hussey (vc); Matthew Hayden; Simon Katich; Mark Cosgrove; Phil Jaques; Andrew Symonds; Michael Clarke; Damien Martyn; Shane Watson; Brad Haddin (wk); Brett Lee; Brad Hogg; Nathan Bracken; Daniel Cullen; Mitchell Johnson; Stuart Clark; Glenn McGrath	Rahul Dravid (c); Virender Sehwag (vc); Sachin Tendulkar; Yuvraj Singh; Mohammad Kaif; Suresh Raina; MS Dhoni (wk); Irfan Pathan; Ajit Agarkar; Munaf Patel; RP Singh; Ramesh Powar; Harbhajan Singh; Dinesh Mongia; Sreesanth	Brian Lara (c); Ramnaresh Sarwan (vc); Chris Gayle; Shivnarine Chanderpaul; Runako Morton; Dwayne Bravo; Dwayne Smith; Carlton Baugh (wk); Corey Collymore; Fidel Edwards; Ian Bradshaw; Jerome Taylor; Marlon Samuels; Wavell Hinds

- Glenn McGrath and Matthew Hayden were recalled after long absences, while Mark Cosgrove, Phil Jaques and Mitchell Johnson travelled home after third match.
- Sachin Tendulkar made a comeback to the Indian team, after a long injury layoff.
- The West Indies Cricket Board were in a payment conflict with the West Indies Players' Association about this series, as the WIPA claims it was not informed before the WICB agreed to the matches, but a deal was eventually agreed in early August.

== Match summary ==
=== 1st match: Australia v West Indies ===
12 September 2006
14:30 (D/N)
Scorecard

Australia; 279/9 (50 overs)	v	West Indies; 201 (34.3 overs)
Michael Clarke 81 (79); Jerome Taylor 3/59 (10 overs)		Shivnarine Chanderpaul 92 (83); Shane Watson 4/43 (8 overs)

Australia won by 78 runs
Kinrara Academy Oval, Kuala Lumpur
Umpires: Asad Rauf (Pak) and Tony Hill (NZ)
Player of the match: Shane Watson (Aus)

- Australia won the toss and elected to bat.
- Australia 5, West Indies 0

Shane Watson's four wickets were a factor when West Indies went "a position of dominance to crash to a 78-run defeat" against an experimental Australian side, according to the BBC match report. Phil Jaques fell for a 10-ball two, bowled by Fidel Edwards, before Simon Katich put on a stand of 98 with Ricky Ponting. When both were dismissed by Ian Bradshaw, Michael Clarke entered to hit 81 off 79 balls, before the last four partnerships contributed 21 runs and sent Australia for 279 for nine.

Replying, Shivnarine Chanderpaul hit 92 with four sixes and ten fours, and shared an opening stand of 136 with Chris Gayle. In the 24th over, West Indies required 108 to win and had nine wickets in hand; from there on, four men were caught behind by Brad Haddin, and West Indies lost nine wickets for 29 runs. From Lara at No. 4 to Edwards at No. 11, the batsmen contributed 15 runs, Bravo making eight of those. The collapse was described by Cricinfo editor Dileep Pramachandran as one "that made a house of cards look sturdy."

Australia captain Ricky Ponting was fined his entire match fee after "showing dissent at an umpire's decision", his second such offense in five months, after Asad Rauf called a wide in the 33rd over of West Indies' innings.

=== 2nd match: India v West Indies ===
14 September 2006
14:30 (D/N)
Scorecard

India; 309/5 (50 overs)	v	West Indies; 141/2 (20 overs)
Sachin Tendulkar 141* (148); Jerome Taylor 3/64 (10 overs)		Chris Gayle 45 (35); Munaf Patel 1/18 (5 overs)

West Indies won by 29 runs (D/L method)
Kinrara Academy Oval, Kuala Lumpur
Umpires: Mark Benson (Eng) and Asad Rauf (Pak)
Player of the match: Sachin Tendulkar (Ind)

- India won the toss and elected to bat.
- Points: West Indies 5, India 0

India won the toss, and chose to bat. Sachin Tendulkar, who played his first completed official international since March 2006, scored 141 not out, and put on stands with Rahul Dravid and Irfan Pathan to lead India to 200 for one. Pathan got out to Chris Gayle, and Jerome Taylor picked up three wickets, on a pitch where "grubbers...accounted for three of the batsmen". Match referee Chris Broad said that a small depression in the pitch had developed, and the organisers were forced to change their pitch rotation. India batted out their 50 overs, though, with Tendulkar hitting four sixes after he reached his hundred, and the fifth-wicket stand between him and Suresh Raina worth 58 runs.

When West Indies batted, they scored even quicker, helped by 26 extras conceded in 20 overs. Chris Gayle struck 45 from 35 deliveries before being caught behind off Munaf Patel, and Patel and Ajit Agarkar were the only Indian bowlers to concede less than seven an over. With West Indies' at 141 for two, requiring 170 to win in the next 30 overs, rain stopped play at 8:35pm local time, and the players never returned.

=== 3rd match: Australia v India ===
16 September 2006
14:30 (D/N)
Scorecard

Australia; 244 (49.2 overs)	v	India; 35/5 (8 overs)
Shane Watson 79 (74); Munaf Patel 3/53 (10 overs)		Sachin Tendulkar 12 (17); Mitchell Johnson 4/11 (4 overs)

No result
Kinrara Academy Oval, Kuala Lumpur
Umpires: Mark Benson (Eng) and Tony Hill (NZ)
Player of the match: Not awarded

- Australia won the toss and elected to bat.
- Points: Australia 2, India 2

Australia batted first, with Shane Watson and Phil Jaques adding 64 in the first 10 overs. Watson fell for 79, having led Australia to 157 for four, and Michael Clarke scored his 64 at a much slower strike rate of 68. With no one below Clarke passing 20, Australia were bowled out for 244, Ajit Agarkar claiming two men caught behind and Munaf Patel taking three wickets in his ten overs. All batsmen were caught, save for Brad Haddin, who was run out.

The reply was interrupted twice by rain: India returned at 16 for nought in the fifth over, then lost five wickets in 18 balls, with Mitchell Johnson responsible for four of them in his seventh One-day International. The fifth was a run out. Then rain intervened again, and the game was called off as a no result.

=== 4th match: Australia v West Indies ===
18 September 2006
13:30 (D/N)
Scorecard

Australia; 272/6 (50 overs)	v	West Indies; 273/7 (47.2 overs)
Michael Hussey 109* (90); Ian Bradshaw 2/35 (10 overs)		Brian Lara 87 (80); Brett Lee 3/46 (10 overs)

West Indies won by 3 wickets
Kinrara Academy Oval, Kuala Lumpur
Umpires: Asad Rauf (Pak) and Tony Hill (NZ)
Player of the match: Michael Hussey (Aus)

- Australia won the toss and elected to bat.
- Points: West Indies 4, Australia 0

West Indies beat Australia by 3 wickets to book a place in the DLF Cup final. Michael Hussey led the Australian team for the first time in the absence of Ricky Ponting. Australia batted first and scored 272/6 in 50 overs. Opener Matthew Hayden scored 49 runs from 77 balls while Hussey scored a brisk 109 off just 90 balls and Brad Haddin scored 70 runs off 77 balls. Hussey and Haddin added 165 together, a world record for the sixth wicket in ODIs. Ian Bradshaw was the pick of the West Indies bowlers claiming 2 wickets for 35 runs.

West Indies chase got off to a slow start and they were 44/2 by the end of 12th over when Brian Lara walked to the crease. Chris Gayle and Brian Lara then put on a 151 run partnership at a rate of close to 7.8 runs per over and set the stage for the chase. Gayle scored 79 while Lara scored a match-winning 87 off 80 balls. Lara fell with West Indies still needing 31 off 9.4 overs. 3 quick wickets followed Lara's dismissal leaving West Indies at 255/7 in 43.4 overs. However Dwayne Bravo and Carlton Baugh played sensibly and guided West Indies to a 3 wicket win with 16 balls to spare. Australia's Stuart Clark finished with bowling figures of 7-0-87-0; his economy rate of 12.42 tied the then-record of Tapash Baisya for the worst economy rate ever in an ODI innings (with a qualification of at least five overs bowled); the record was surpassed in February 2012.

=== 5th match: India v West Indies ===
20 September 2006
13:30 (D/N)
Scorecard

India; 162 (39.3 overs)	v	West Indies; 146 (41 overs)
Sachin Tendulkar 65 (102); Dwayne Smith 4/31 (10 overs)		Brian Lara 40* (48); Harbhajan Singh 3/35 (8 overs)

India won by 16 runs
Kinrara Academy Oval, Kuala Lumpur
Umpires: Mark Benson (Eng) and Tony Hill (NZ)
Player of the match: Harbhajan Singh (Ind)

- India won the toss and elected to bat.
- Points: India 4, West Indies 0

Rahul Dravid won the toss and decided to bat first. The decision soon backfired when Dwayne Smith removed Dravid in the very first over of the game. Sehwag's bad form continued as he dismissed for 1 by Smith leaving India at 6/2. When MS Dhoni fell, India were struggling at 69/5. Dwayne Bravo picked up the first four Indian wickets to fall. Harbhajan Singh and Sachin Tendulkar then put on an 87 run partnership. Harbhajan scored 37 while Sachin Tendulkar scored 65. India were eventually bowled out for 162 inside 40 overs.

West Indies got off to a decent start with the openers putting on a 44 runs stand. Wickets then fell regularly and West Indies were bowled out for 146. Agarkar, Munaf Patel and Sreesanth picked two wickets each, while Harbhajan Singh picked up three wickets towards the end. Harbhajan Singh was declared the Man of the Match for his contributions with the bat as well as the ball.

The next game between India and Australia would decide the team that would go through to the finals.

=== 6th match: Australia v India ===
22 September 2006
13:30 (D/N)
Scorecard

Australia; 213 (48.1 overs)	v	India; 195 (43.5 overs)
Matthew Hayden 54 (66); R. P. Singh 2/43 (9.1 overs)		Dinesh Mongia 63* (90); Brett Lee 5/38 (8.5 overs)

Australia won by 18 runs
Kinrara Academy Oval, Kuala Lumpur
Umpires: Mark Benson (Eng) and Asad Rauf (Pak)
Player of the match: Brett Lee (Aus)

- Australia won the toss and elected to bat.
- Points: Australia 4, India 0

=== Final: Australia v West Indies ===
24 September (D/N)
Scorecard

Australia; 240/6 (50 overs)	v	West Indies; 113 (34.2 overs)
Andrew Symonds 52 (59); Ramnaresh Sarwan 2/21 (4 overs)		Ramnaresh Sarwan 36 (64); Brett Lee 4/24 (8.2 overs)

Australia won by 127 runs
Kinrara Academy Oval, Kuala Lumpur
Umpires: Asad Rauf (Pak) and Mark Benson (Eng)
Player of the match: Brett Lee (Aus)

- Australia won the toss and elected to bat.

Australia defeated West Indies by 127 runs to lift the DLF Cup. Ricky Ponting won the toss and decided to bat first. Shane Watson was the first wicket to fall for Australia. He scored 18. Skipper Ricky Ponting soon followed making 6, before Damien Martyn and Andrew Symonds scored 52 each. Michael Hussey hit a 24-ball 30 to take Australia to 240 in 50 overs. Ian Bradshaw was the pick of the West Indian bowlers with figures of two for 30 from his 10 overs.

West Indies had a horrible start to their innings losing Chris Gayle to the very first ball. Runako Morton made a 31-ball duck, the slowest ever duck in One Day Internationals. West Indies lost wickets at regular intervals and were 56 for six at one stage. Ramnaresh Sarwan and Dwayne Smith scored 30's while rest of the batsmen barring Shivnarine Chanderpaul got one-digit scores.

Brett Lee was declared Man of the Match for his four wickets.

== See also ==
- 2005–06 DLF Cup
