= Yasir Hameed =

Pakistani cricketer (born 1978)

Yasir Hameed یاسر حمید
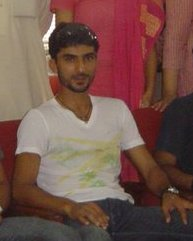
- Yasir Hameed in 2008

Personal information
- Full name: Yasir Hameed Qureshi
- Born: 28 February 1978 (age 48); Peshawar, Khyber Pakhtunkhwa, Pakistan
- Batting: Right-handed
- Bowling: Right-arm offbreak
- Role: Batsman

International information
- National side: Pakistan (2003–2010)
- Test debut (cap 176): 20 April 2003 v Bangladesh
- Last Test: 26 April 2010 v England
- ODI debut (cap 147): 20 May 2003 v New Zealand
- Last ODI: 18 November 2007 v India

Career statistics
Competition	Test	ODI
Matches	25	56
Runs scored	1,491	2,028
Batting average	32.41	36.87
100s/50s	2/8	3/12
Top score	170	127*
Balls bowled	78	18
Wickets	0	0
Bowling average	–	–
5 wickets in innings	–	–
10 wickets in match	–	–
Best bowling	–	–
Catches/stumpings	20/–	14/–
- Source: Cricinfo, 8 September 2017

Yasir Hameed Qureshi (Urdu: یاسر حمید قریشی) (born 28 February 1978) is a former Pakistani cricketer, who played 25 Tests and 56 ODIs for Pakistan. He scored two centuries (170 runs in the first innings and 105 in the second) on his Test debut against Bangladesh, becoming only the second player to do so behind Lawrence Rowe.

== Personal life ==
Born in Peshawar, he is originally from Kukmang, Abbottabad District, Khyber Pakhtunkhwa.

== Cricket career ==
=== Domestic career ===
In September 2007, Yasir Hameed played a major role in defeating Australia A in a comprehensive 3–0 defeat while representing Pakistan A. He scored two centuries out of the three matches and was given good support by Naved Latif and Taufeeq Umar while the bowlers also did well in the series.

He was the leading run-scorer for Federally Administered Tribal Areas in the 2017–18 Quaid-e-Azam Trophy, with 459 runs in seven matches.

=== International career ===
During his first thirty One Day International innings, he scored more runs than any other batsman, as well as scoring four successive opening partnerships of 100 or more with Imran Farhat, a unique achievement. He scored first 1000 ODI runs in just 22 matches, fastest in Asia and third fastest in world.

He was then left out of the squad because of a dip in form. He came back in the final ODI in the Bank Alfalah Series against England in 2005/6, scored 57 but was again ignored only to return against West Indies in the fourth match in November 2006, where he scored 71 runs from 118 balls. He has not played international cricket since August 2010.

In 2003 on his Test debut, he scored 170 runs in Karachi. This is the highest score by a Pakistani on debut. He also scored 105 in the second innings of the same match.

In 2004, against India in Peshawar, with the five-match series level at 1–1, Pakistan held India to 244/9 in the third ODI. India's fast bowlers hit back to leave the hosts 65/4, but Hameed steadied the reply. On a slightly uneven surface he blunted India's pace attack, then unfurled a series of fluent drives to lay the platform for the chase.

He played 22 further Tests before losing his place in the side following Pakistan's unsuccessful tour of India in 2007. He was recalled nearly 18 months later for Pakistan's two-match series against Australia, played in England owing to the security situation in Pakistan where he played two test matches against England and he was again dropped from the national side.

== Post-retirement ==
=== Coaching career ===
In February 2021, he began to undertake coaching courses with the Pakistan Cricket Board.

=== Cricket administration ===
In February 2023, he became a member of Haroon Rasheed's national selection committee.
