= The Greatest Rivalry: India vs Pakistan =

2025 Indian sports documentary series

- Promotional poster
- Genre: Documentary; Sports
- Directed by: Chandradev Bhagat; Stewart Sugg
- Country of origin: India
- Original languages: Hindi; English
- No. of episodes: 3

Production
- Running time: 34–40 minutes
- Production company: Grey Matter Entertainment

Original release
- Network: Netflix
- Release: 7 February 2025

The Greatest Rivalry: India vs Pakistan is a 2025 Indian sports documentary series that premiered globally on Netflix on 7 February 2025. The three-part series traces the cricketing rivalry between the India and Pakistan, interweaving archived match footage, interviews with former players, and commentary on the cultural and political backdrop of the contests.

== Synopsis ==
The series presents the India–Pakistan cricket rivalry as one of the most emotionally charged and widely followed in the sport. It is structured across three episodes:

- Episode 1: Rise of the Legends – charts the emergence of leading players from both sides, setting the stage for the historic confrontations.
- Episode 2: The Battleground – focuses on the 2004 India tour of Pakistan, a landmark series in the rivalry.
- Episode 3: Making History – covers later phases including the rise of the Indian Premier League (IPL) and contemporary clashes between the two teams.

The documentary features interviews with Virender Sehwag, Sourav Ganguly, Sunil Gavaskar, Shoaib Akhtar, Waqar Younis, and Javed Miandad, among others.

== Production ==
The series was directed by Chandradev Bhagat and Stewart Sugg, and produced by Grey Matter Entertainment. It was released globally as a Netflix Original on 7 February 2025.

Each episode runs between 34 and 40 minutes and combines match archives with behind-the-scenes commentary and recollections from cricketing personalities.

== Themes ==
=== Sport and politics ===
The documentary portrays India–Pakistan matches as more than sporting contests, framing them as cultural and political events that reflect national identities and tensions.

=== Nostalgia ===
Critics described the series as a nostalgic revisit to the golden era of India–Pakistan cricket, particularly the 1990s and early 2000s.

=== Iconic moments ===
The documentary revisits defining episodes such as Pakistan’s reverse swing mastery, India’s 2004 tour of Pakistan, and personal rivalries like Sehwag versus Akhtar, which have become part of cricketing folklore.

== Release and reception ==
The series was released on Netflix on 7 February 2025. Reviews were mixed. The Indian Express gave it two out of five stars, calling it "disappointing both as a sports drama and as non-fiction storytelling," and noting the omission of some major figures like Sachin Tendulkar.

Firstpost described the series as “entertaining and nostalgia-laden,” praising interviews with Sehwag and Akhtar.

The Hindu and The Telegraph noted that while the production values were high, the series lacked deeper analysis of the rivalry’s political undertones.

Abhishek Srivastava of Times of India gave it 2.5/5 and stated "the series ultimately feels incomplete. Had it explored matches from the 1970s onward, it would have felt more well-rounded, and the title would have been more fitting. As it stands, this documentary will appeal only to a niche audience, and those expecting an in-depth look at the fierce rivalry of the '70s and '80s will likely be disappointed."

== Episodes ==
Episode	Title	Synopsis
1	Rise of the Legends	Chronicles the emergence of early cricket icons and the origins of the India–Pakistan rivalry.
2	The Battleground	Focuses on the 2004 India tour of Pakistan and the major on-field contests.
3	Making History	Examines the post-2000s era, including the IPL’s influence and later cricketing encounters.

== See also ==
- India–Pakistan cricket rivalry
- List of Netflix original programming
