= Indian cricket team in Pakistan in 1997–98 =

International cricket tour

	Pakistan	India
- Dates: 28 September – 2 October 1997
Captains	Saeed Anwar	Sachin Tendulkar

One Day International series
- Results: Pakistan won the 3-match series 2–1
Most runs	Ijaz Ahmed (192)	Ajay Jadeja (125)
Most wickets	Waqar Younis (6); Aaqib Javed (6)	Nilesh Kulkarni (6)

The Indian cricket team toured Pakistan from 28 September to 2 October 1997 to play three One Day Internationals as part of the Wills Challenge Series. The tournament was staged to commemorate the 50 years of Pakistan's independence. Pakistan won the series 2–1.

== Squads ==
Pakistan	India
Saeed Anwar (c); Ijaz Ahmed; Shahid Afridi; Inzamam-ul-Haq; Moin Khan (wk); Mohammad Wasim; Saleem Elahi; Hasan Raza; Waqar Younis; Aaqib Javed; Saqlain Mushtaq; Azhar Mahmood; Mohammad Hussain; Shahid Nazir	Sachin Tendulkar (c); Vinod Kambli; Harvinder Singh; Ajay Jadeja; Robin Singh; Nilesh Kulkarni; Mohammad Azharuddin; Saba Karim (wk); Rajesh Chauhan; Rahul Dravid; Debasis Mohanty; Hrishikesh Kanitkar; Sourav Ganguly; Abey Kuruvilla

Pakistan announced a 14-member squad for the series on 25 September. Captain Ramiz Raja, Salim Malik and Mohammad Akram were dropped; pacer Waqar Younis was included in the squad along with batsmen Mohammad Wasim and Saleem Elahi. Saeed Anwar was appointed captain of the side and Moin Khan his deputy.

== Match results ==
=== 1st ODI ===
28 September 1997
Scorecard

India; 170 (49 overs)	v	Pakistan; 171/5 (44.3 overs)
Rahul Dravid 50 (81); Aaqib Javed 4/29 (8 overs)		Shahid Afridi 45 (60); Nilesh Kulkarni 3/27 (10 overs)

Pakistan won by 5 wickets
Niaz Stadium, Hyderabad
Umpires: Said Shah (Pak) and Saleem Badar (Pak)
Player of the match: Aaqib Javed (Pak)

- India won the toss and elected to bat.

=== 2nd ODI ===
30 September 1997
Scorecard

Pakistan; 265/4 (47.2 overs)	v	India; 266/6 (46.3 overs)
Inzamam-ul-Haq 74* (92); Rajesh Chauhan 2/48 (10 overs)		Sourav Ganguly 89 (96); Waqar Younis 2/36 (9 overs)

India won by 4 wickets
National Stadium, Karachi
Umpires: Mohammad Aslam (Pak) and Saleem Badar (Pak)
Player of the match: Sourav Ganguly (Ind)

- Pakistan won the toss and elected to bat.
- Crowd disturbance involving stone-throwing three times during Pakistan's innings led to closure of innings after 47.2 overs, and India were set a target of 266 in 47 overs. A total of 19 minutes of play was lost due to the disturbance.

=== 3rd ODI ===
2 October 1997 (D/N)
Scorecard

India; 216 (49.2 overs)	v	Pakistan; 219/1 (26.2 overs)
Ajay Jadeja 76 (109); Azhar Mahmood 3/34 (9 overs)		Ijaz Ahmed 139* (84); Nilesh Kulkarni 1/57 (8 overs)

Pakistan won by 9 wickets
Gaddafi Stadium, Lahore
Umpires: Javed Akhtar (Pak) and Mohammad Nazir (Pak)
Player of the match: Ijaz Ahmed (Pak)

- Pakistan won the toss and elected to field.
- Shahid Afridi (Pak) passed 1,000 runs in ODIs.
