= Amit Bhandari =

Indian cricketer (born 1978)

Cricket information
- Batting: Right-handed
- Bowling: Right-arm fast-medium
- Source: ESPNcricinfo, 21 April 2007

Amit Bhandari (born 1 October 1978) is an Indian cricketer. Having made an unforgettable debut in 2000, his performances in the 2001–02 season kept him within striking distance of being re-selected.

Bhandari's lack of pace is compensated by his aggressive bowling, which was demonstrated in the India A tour of England in 2003, where he became the top wicket-taker. Bhandari joins Lakshmipathy Balaji and Aavishkar Salvi in the search for a place in the Indian team.

He is the Chairman of Selectors for Delhi senior and U-23 teams. Bhandari was in the news on 11 February 2019 as he was beaten up by some U-23 players. Those players weren't selected in the team and as an act of retaliation they attacked him.
