= 2005–06 DLF Cup =

2005-06 DLF Cup
- Date: April 18, 2006 – April 19, 2006
- Location: United Arab Emirates
- Result: Series tied 1-1
- Player of the series: (Pakistan) Inzamam ul-Haq
Teams
- India: Pakistan
Captains
- (India) Rahul Dravid: (Pakistan) Inzamam ul-Haq
Most runs
- Rahul Dravid (112) Virender Sehwag (73) Mahendra Singh Dhoni (62): Inzamam-ul-Haq (119); Younis Khan (76); Shoaib Malik (57)
Most wickets
- Ramesh Powar (4) Ajit Agarkar (3) Irfan Pathan (3): Shoaib Malik (3); Naved-ul-Hasan (3); Shahid Afridi (2)

The DLF Cup (named after sponsor DLF) was the name for two one-day internationals between India and Pakistan to be held in United Arab Emirates in April. The revenue of the friendship cup matches went to help the victims of the 2005 Kashmir earthquake. The DLF Cup also signifies the return of cricket to the Middle East after a 6-year absence.

== Schedule ==
Date	Match	Venue
18 April	1st ODI	Abu Dhabi
19 April	2nd ODI	Abu Dhabi

== Squads ==
India	Pakistan
Rahul Dravid (c); Virender Sehwag (vc); Robin Uthappa; Yuvraj Singh; Mohammad Kaif; Suresh Raina; MS Dhoni (wk); Irfan Pathan; Harbhajan Singh; Ramesh Powar; Ajit Agarkar; Munaf Patel; Venugopal Rao; Sreesanth; R. P. Singh	Inzamam-ul-Haq (c); Younis Khan (vc); Imran Farhat; Shoaib Malik; Mohammad Yousuf; Kamran Akmal (wk); Shahid Afridi; Danish Kaneria; Abdul Razzaq; Mohammad Asif; Rao Iftikhar Anjum; Naved-ul-Hasan; Faisal Iqbal; Abdur Rehman

== ODI Series ==
=== 1st ODI ===
18 April
Scorecard

India; 197 (50 Overs)	v	Pakistan; 201/4 (48.3 Overs)
Y Venugopal Rao 61 (93); Ajit Agarkar 2/33 (10 Overs)		Younis Khan 71* (96); Shoaib Malik 3/40 (10 Overs)

Pakistan won by 6 wickets
Sheikh Zayed Cricket Stadium, Abu Dhabi
Umpires: Brian Jerling (South Africa) and Rudi Koertzen (South Africa)
Player of the match: Younis Khan (PAK)

- India won the toss and chose to bat.
- Pakistan leads the series 1-0.

=== 2nd ODI ===
19 April
Scorecard

India; 269/5 (50 Overs)	v	Pakistan; 218 (45.2 Overs)
Rahul Dravid 92 (116); Irfan Pathan 3/35 (10 Overs)		Inzamam-ul-Haq 79 (91); Naved-ul-Hasan 2/45 (10 Overs)

India won by 51 runs
Sheikh Zayed Cricket Stadium, Abu Dhabi
Umpires: Brian Jerling (South Africa) and Rudi Koertzen (South Africa)
Player of the match: Rahul Dravid (IND)

- India won the toss and chose to bat.
- India levels the series 1-1.
