= List of Pakistan National Shipping Corporation cricketers =

List of cricketers

This is a list of all cricketers who have played first-class or List A matches for Pakistan National Shipping Corporation cricket team. The team played 111 first-class matches between 1987 and 2000 and 92 List A matches between 1988 and 2000. Seasons given are first and last seasons; the player did not necessarily play in all the intervening seasons.

== Players ==
- Aamer Ishaq, 1988/89–1995/96
- Abdullah Khan, 1987/88–1989/90
- Afzaal Saeed, 1986/87
- Ahmed Hayat, 1996/97
- Alauddin, 1993/94–1995/96
- Rehan Alikhan, 1993/94–1994/95
- Ali Naqvi, 1998/99
- Ali Raza, 1998/99–1999/00
- Amin Lakhani, 1986/87–1992/93
- Azam Khan, 1993/94–1995/96
- Azeem Hafeez, 1986/87–1988/89
- Azhar Sultan, 1986/87–1987/88
- Bilal Khilji, 1996/97
- Danish Kaneria, 1998/99
- Faisal Athar, 1999/00
- Faisal Iqbal, 1998/99–1999/00
- Farrukh Bari, 1987/88–1994/95
- Ghulam Hussain, 1990/91–1992/93
- Ijaz Ahmed, 1987/88–1990/91
- Iqbal Imam, 1997/98–1999/00
- Iqtidar Ali, 1986/87
- Irfan Fazil, 1998/99
- Irfan Habib, 1989/90
- Irfan Rana, 1990/91
- Kamran Haider, 1995/96
- Kashif Ahmed, 1997/98–1999/00
- Kashif Ibrahim, 1999/00
- Mahmood Hamid, 1987/88–1992/93
- Maisam Hasnain, 1995/96–1996/97
- Majid Saeed, 1996/97
- Manzoor Ali, 1987/88
- Mazhar Qayyum, 1995/96–1998/99
- Mohammad Javed, 1990/91–1992/93
- Mohammad Ramzan, 1998/99–1999/00
- Mohsin Kamal, 1986/87–1998/99
- Mohtashim Rasheed, 1998/99–1999/00
- Mubeen Faraz, 1986/87
- Murtaza Hussain, 1995/96–1996/97
- Mutahir Shah, 1986/87–1999/00
- Nadeem Afzal, 1991/92–1992/93
- Nasir Wasti, 1986/87–1999/00
- Naved Nazir, 1993/94–1994/95
- Nisar Abbas, 1999/00
- Pervez-ul-Hasan, 1987/88–1998/99
- Qaiser Rasheed, 1987/88–1990/91
- Rameez Raja, 1987/88–1991/92
- Rashid Mahmood, 1989/90
- Riaz Sheikh, 1999/00
- Sajid Shah, 1993/94–1996/97
- Sajjad Akbar, 1986/87–1999/00
- Sajjad Ali, 1993/94–1999/00
- Sanaullah Sharif, 1988/89
- Shadab Kabir, 1998/99
- Shahid Anwar, 1986/87
- Shahid Hussain, 1996/97–1997/98
- Shahid Qambrani, 1999/00
- Sher Ali, 1993/94–1996/97
- Siddiq Patni, 1986/87
- Sohail Farooqi, 1989/90–1994/95
- Sohail Jaffar, 1989/90–1995/96
- Sohail Miandad, 1988/89–1992/93
- Sultan Kamdar, 1990/91
- Tahir Butt, 1996/97–1998/99
- Tahir Mahmood, 1993/94–1996/97
- Tariq Hussain, 1993/94–1997/98
- Umar Rasheed, 1997/98–1999/00
- Yasir Shakeeb, 1998/99–1999/00
- Zafar Iqbal, 1990/91–1992/93
- Zeeshan Siddiqi, 1995/96–1996/97
- Zeeshan Tanvir, 1999/00
