= List of Pakistan Automobiles Corporation cricketers =

List of cricketers

This is a list of all cricketers who have played first-class or List A matches for Pakistan Automobiles Corporation cricket team. The team played 83 first-class matches between 1983 and 1993 and 69 List A matches between 1984 and 1993. The seasons mentioned next to players' names are the first and the last season of the player; the player did not necessarily play in all the intervening seasons.

== Players ==
- Aamer Hanif, 1989/90-1993/94
- Aamer Wasim, 1987/88
- Aaqib Javed, 1989/90-1991/92
- Abdullah Khan, 1990/91-1992/93
- Adnan Sabri, 1984/85
- G. M. Ahmed, 1983/84-1984/85
- Arshad Nawaz, 1983/84-1985/86
- Ashfaq Ahmed, 1992/93
- Ata-ur-Rehman, 1990/91-1991/92
- Ayaz Jilani, 1985/86-1991/92
- Basit Ali, 1989/90
- Dara Bashir, 1986/87-1987/88
- Fakhruddin Baloch, 1991/92
- Farrukh Raza, 1986/87-1987/88
- Ghaffar Kazmi, 1983/84
- Ghaffar Khan, 1983/84
- Ghulam Ali, 1990/91-1993/94
- Ijaz Ahmed, 1983/84-1985/86
- Imtiaz Ahmed, 1986/87
- Javed Hayat, 1989/90
- Junaid Alvi, 1983/84-1986/87
- Kamran Khan, 1991/92-1993/94
- Khalid Alvi, 1985/86
- Mahmood Zamir, 1989/90
- Maqsood Raza, 1987/88-1989/90
- Masood Anwar, 1984/85-1986/87
- Mian Fayyaz, 1983/84-1992/93
- Mohammad Aslam, 1993/94
- Mohammad Zahid, 1991/92-1993/94
- Moin Mumtaz, 1983/84-1987/88
- Mujahid Jamshed, 1992/93-1993/94
- Murtaza Hussain, 1992/93-1993/94
- Mustaqeem Ahmed, 1993/94
- Nadeem Ahsan, 1985/86
- Nadeem Khan, 1989/90
- Nadeem Moosa, 1986/87-1987/88
- Najam Wahab, 1986/87
- Ghulam Pasha, 1989/90
- Qaiser Hussain, 1983/84-1985/86
- Rashid Mahmood, 1990/91-1991/92
- Sanaullah Khan, 1983/84-1993/94
- Shahid Anwar, 1987/88-1990/91
- Shahid Hussain, 1993/94
- Shahid Mahboob, 1983/84-1991/92
- Shahid Nawaz, 1989/90-1993/94
- Shahid Pervez, 1983/84-1984/85
- Shahid Saeed, 1991/92-1993/94
- Shahzad Bashir, 1983/84-1985/86
- Shaukat Mirza, 1983/84-1984/85
- Sher Ali, 1986/87-1992/93
- Siddiq Patni, 1985/86
- Sohail Khan, 1983/84
- Tahir Mahmood, 1985/86-1993/94
- Tanvir Ahmed, 1983/84
- Tanvir Khan, 1986/87
- Umar Rasheed, 1983/84-1993/94
- Wasim Akram, 1984/85-1985/86
- Yahya Toor, 1983/84-1993/94
- Zahid Fazal, 1989/90
- Zahoor Elahi, 1986/87-1987/88
- Zulqarnain, 1991/92-1993/94
