= List of Industrial Development Bank of Pakistan cricketers =

List of cricketers

This is a list of all cricketers who have played first-class or List A matches for Industrial Development Bank of Pakistan cricket team. The team played twenty first-class matches from the 1979/80 to 1981/82 seasons as well as four List A matches in the 1980/81 season. Seasons given are first and last seasons; the player did not necessarily play in the one intervening season (1980/81).

== Notable players ==
- Adnan Butt, 1979/80
- Anwar Miandad, 1979/80-1981/82
- Ashfaq Malik, 1980/81-1981/82
- Ghaffar Khan, 1979/80-1980/81
- Iqbal Chippa, 1979/80-1981/82
- Jalaluddin, 1979/80-1981/82
- Mohammad Afzal, 1981/82
- Mohinder Kumar, 1980/81-1981/82
- Munir-ul-Haq, 1981/82
- Qaiser Hussain, 1980/81-1981/82
- Sagheer Abbas, 1979/80-1981/82
- Sajid Khan, 1980/81
- Saleem Anwar, 1980/81
- Saleem Yousuf, 1979/80-1981/82
- Shahid Mahboob, 1979/80-1981/82
- Shahid Rana, 1980/81
- Shaukat Mirza, 1979/80-1980/81
- Tahir Rasheed, 1979/80-1980/81
- Tanvir Ali, 1980/81-1981/82
- Vakil Tatari, 1979/80
- Zia-ur-Rehman, 1980/81
