= Indian cricket team in Pakistan in 1978–79 =

International cricket tour

Indians in Pakistan in 1978–79
	India	Pakistan
- Dates: 27 September – 19 November 1978
Captains	Bishan Singh Bedi	Mushtaq Mohammad

Test series
- Result: Pakistan won the 3-match series 2–0
Most runs	Sunil Gavaskar (447)	Zaheer Abbas (583)
Most wickets	Bhagwat Chandrasekhar (8)	Sarfraz Nawaz (17)

One Day International series
- Results: Pakistan won the 3-match series 2–1
Most runs	Surinder Amarnath (100)	Zaheer Abbas (91)
Most wickets	Mohinder Amarnath (4)	Hasan Jamil (6)

The India national cricket team toured Pakistan during the 1978–79 cricket season. They played three Test matches against the Pakistan cricket team, with Pakistan winning the series 2–0. The tour also featured three One Day International (ODI) matches. In the third match, India's captain, Bishen Bedi, conceded the game in protest against Sarfraz Nawaz short-pitched bowling. It was the first time an international cricket match had ended in this way. India also played six tour matches, all of which were first-class fixtures.

== Background ==
This was going to be the first tour for either sides in 17 years. India were touring Pakistan only for the second time and first after 1954–55. India was set to tour Pakistan sometime in the mid-1960s, but wars between the two countries in 1965 and 1971, and political instability in both countries in the mid-1970s scrapped any possibility of an immediate future series. However, in early 1978, Board of Control for Cricket in India and Pakistan Cricket Board finally penned down the dates during which the tour would take place: from 27 September till 19 November 1978. Before the tour, 15 Tests were played between the teams, with India winning two, Pakistan one and the rest ending in draws.

== Touring party ==
Fatehsinghrao Gaekwad was named India's tour manager on 27 August 1978; P. R. Man Singh was named his deputy. Bishan Singh Bedi's retention as captain was announced on 30 August and the squad was named on 19 September, following a camp in Bangalore between 5 and 14 September of 25 probables. Mansoor Ali Khan Pataudi was dropped from the squad, which included three uncapped players — Kapil Dev, Bharath Reddy and Yashpal Sharma. India went with the famed spin quartet comprising Bedi, B. S. Chandrasekhar, E. A. S. Prasanna and S. Venkataraghavan, who had by now 700 Test wickets between them. The party flew to Karachi on 24 September before the first match starting on 27 September.

The squad included:

- Bishan Singh Bedi (c)
- Sunil Gavaskar (vc)
- Mohinder Amarnath
- Surinder Amarnath
- B. S. Chandrasekhar
- Chetan Chauhan
- Kapil Dev
- Anshuman Gaekwad
- Karsan Ghavri
- Syed Kirmani
- E. A. S. Prasanna
- Bharath Reddy
- Yashpal Sharma
- Dilip Vengsarkar
- S. Venkataraghavan
- Gundappa Viswanath

== Tour matches ==
=== Three-day: Banks XI v Indians ===
27–29 September 1978
Scorecard

Indians	v	Banks XI
309/1d (103 overs); Sunil Gavaskar 165*; Abdur Raqib 1/48 (18 overs)		212/3d (65 overs); Javed Miandad 87*; Karsan Ghavri 1/31 (7 overs)
180/4d (62 overs); Dilip Vengsarkar 72*; Abdur Raqib 2/76 (23 overs)		124/2 (25 overs); Wasim Raja 58; Bishan Singh Bedi 2/24 (7 overs)

Match drawn
National Stadium, Karachi
Umpires: Mahboob Shah and Shujauddin Siddiqi

- Indians won the toss and decided to bat.
- Javed Miandad (Pak) passed 8,000 runs in first-class matches.

=== Combined XI v Indians ===
4–6 October 1978
Scorecard

Combined XI	v	Indians
268/9d (72 overs); Zaheer Abbas 75; Kapil Dev 3/61 (18 overs)		303/7d (85.1 overs); Surinder Amarnath 71; Anwar Zeb 2/39 (9.1 overs)
201 (65.1 overs); Wasim Raja 45; E. A. S. Prasanna 3/51 (22 overs)		130/8 (50 overs); Sunil Gavaskar 44; Anwar Khan 6/42 (22 overs)

Match drawn
Peshawar Club Ground, Peshawar
Umpires: Agha Saadat Ali and Shakoor Rana

- Combined XI won the toss and elected to bat.
- Shafiq Ahmed (Combined XI) passed 8,000 runs in first-class matches.

=== Three-day: Patron's XI v Indians ===
8–10 October 1978
Scorecard

Indians	v	Patron's XI
258/5d (107 overs); Chetan Chauhan 83; Saleem Altaf 2/24 (21 overs)		199 (71.4 overs); Haroon Rasheed 59; E. A. S. Prasanna 6/35 (27 overs)
188/6 (94 overs); Dilip Vengsarkar 53*; Iqbal Qasim 2/18 (17 overs)

Match drawn
Pindi Club Ground, Rawalpindi
Umpires: Azhar Hasan and Khalid Aziz

- Indians won the toss and elected to bat.
- Sadiq Mohammad (Patron's XI) passed 16,000 runs in first-class matches.

=== Three-day: Combined Universities v Indians ===
23–25 October 1978
Scorecard

Combined Universities	v	Indians
156 (58.5 overs); Ashraf Ali 39; Bishan Singh Bedi 4/47 (18.5 overs)		149 (56.5 overs); Yashpal Sharma 47*; Amin Lakhani 6/58 (25.5 overs)
185 (80.3 overs); Ashraf Ali 51; Karsan Ghavri 4/45 (22.3 overs)		193/8 (76 overs); Surinder Amarnath 72; Amin Lakhani 6/80 (34 overs)

Indians won by 2 wickets
Jahanzeb Polo Ground, Multan
Umpires: Aslam Khokhar and Khizer Hayat

- Combined Universities won the toss and elected to bat.
- Haroon Rasheed (Combined Universities) passed 4,000 runs in first-class matches.
- Amin Lakhani (Combined Universities) claimed hat-tricks in both innings.

=== Three-day: Punjab v Indians ===
5–7 November 1978
Scorecard

Indians	v	Punjab
250/1d (74 overs); Anshuman Gaekwad 126*; Mohammad Nazir 1/69 (25 overs)		242/4d (76 overs); Talat Ali 107; Karsan Ghavri 1/39 (13 overs)
230 (83 overs); Karsan Ghavri 95; Mohammad Nazir 4/77 (36 overs)		93 (21.2 overs); Jamshed Hussain 37; Karsan Ghavri 5/39 (10 overs)

Indians won by 145 runs
Bahawal Stadium, Bahawalpur
Umpires: Amanullah Khan and Salahuddin Ahmed

- Punjab won the toss and elected to field.
- Asad Mahmood (Punjab) made his debut in first-class matches.
- Mohinder Amarnath (Indians) passed 5,000 runs in first-class matches.

=== Three-day: Sind v Indians ===
9–11 November 1978
Scorecard

Sind	v	Indians
224 (73.4 overs); Mohsin Khan 107; S. Venkataraghavan 6/62 (26.4 overs)		286/5d (100 overs); Surinder Amarnath 144; Naeem Ahmed 4/95 (29 overs)
34/1 (16 overs); Mohsin Khan 17*; Kapil Dev 1/13 (4 overs)

Match drawn
Niaz Stadium, Hyderabad
Umpires: Athar Zaidi and Iqbal Athar

- Sind won the toss and elected to bat.
- Anshuman Gaekwad (Indians) passed 4,000 runs in first-class matches.

== Test series ==
=== First Test ===
16–21 October 1978
Scorecard

Pakistan	v	India
503/8d (152 overs); Zaheer Abbas 176; Bhagwat Chandrasekhar 4/130 (38 overs)		462/9d (142.5 overs); Gundappa Viswanath 145; Mushtaq Mohammad 4/55 (27 overs)
264/4d (71.5 overs); Asif Iqbal 104; Surinder Amarnath 1/5 (1.5 overs)		43/0 (19 overs); Chetan Chauhan 30*; Iqbal Qasim 0/0 (4 overs)

Match drawn
Iqbal Stadium, Faisalabad
Umpires: Khalid Aziz (Pak) and Shakoor Rana (Pak)

- Pakistan won the toss and elected to bat.
- This was the first Test played at this venue.
- Kapil Dev (Ind) made his Test debut.
- Javed Miandad (Pak) passed 1,000 runs in Tests.
- Zaheer Abbas and Javed Miandad's first innings partnership of 255 runs for the fourth wicket was the highest for any wicket by either team against each other.
- 19 October was a rest day.
- Gundappa Viswanath became the first India cricketer to make centuries against every Test-playing nation at the time.

=== Second Test ===
27 October–1 November 1978
Scorecard

India	v	Pakistan
199 (56.5 overs); Dilip Vengsarkar 76; Sarfraz Nawaz 4/46 (16 overs)		539/6d (133 overs); Zaheer Abbas 235; Bishan Singh Bedi 2/130 (34 overs)
465 (170.3 overs); Sunil Gavaskar 97; Imran Khan 3/110 (42.3 overs)		128/2 (20.4 overs); Majid Khan 38; Mohinder Amarnath 1/39 (6 overs)

Pakistan won by 8 wickets
Gaddafi Stadium, Lahore
Umpires: Mahboob Shah (Pak) and Shujauddin Siddiqi (Pak)

- Pakistan won the toss and decided to field.
- 30 October was a rest day.
- Zaheer Abbas (Pak) passed 2,000 runs in Tests.

=== Third Test ===
14–19 November 1978
Scorecard

India	v	Pakistan
344 (115.2 overs); Sunil Gavaskar 111; Sarfraz Nawaz 4/89 (31.2 overs)		481/9d (141 overs); Javed Miandad 100; B. S. Chandrasekhar 3/97 (25 overs)
300 (82 overs); Sunil Gavaskar 137 (240); Sarfraz Nawaz 5/70 (24 overs)		164/2 (24.5 overs); Javed Miandad 62; Mohinder Amarnath 1/35 (5.5 overs)

Pakistan won by 8 wickets
National Stadium, Karachi
Umpires: Mahboob Shah (Pak) and Shujauddin Siddiqi (Pak)

- India won the toss and decided to bat.
- 16 November was a rest day.

== ODI series ==
=== First ODI ===
1 October 1978
Scorecard

India; 170/7 (40 overs)	v	Pakistan; 166/8 (40 overs)
Mohinder Amarnath 51 (61); Sarfraz Nawaz 3/34 (8 overs)		Majid Khan 50 (64); Mohinder Amarnath 2/38 (8 overs)

India won by 4 runs
Ayub National Stadium, Quetta
Umpires: Mahboob Shah (Pak) and Shujauddin Siddiqi (Pak)
Player of the match: Mohinder Amarnath (Ind)

- India won the toss and elected to bat.
- Surinder Amarnath, Chetan Chauhan and Kapil Dev (all Ind) made their ODI debuts.

=== Second ODI ===
13 October 1978
Scorecard

India; 79 (34.2 overs)	v	Pakistan; 83/2 (16.5 overs)
Mohinder Amarnath 34* (85); Hasan Jamil 3/18 (8 overs)		Zaheer Abbas 48 (46); Sunil Gavaskar 1/10 (0.5 overs)

Pakistan won by 8 wickets
Jinnah Stadium, Sialkot
Umpires: Agha Saadat Ali (Pak) and Shakoor Rana (Pak)
Player of the match: Hasan Jamil (Pak)

- Pakistan won the toss and elected to field.
- Yashpal Sharma (Ind), and Azmat Rana (Pak) made their ODI debuts.

=== 3rd ODI ===
3 November 1978
Scorecard

Pakistan; 205/7 (40 overs)	v	India; 183/2 (37.4 overs)
Asif Iqbal 62 (72); S. Venkataraghavan 2/34 (8 overs)		Anshuman Gaekwad 78* (115); Asif Iqbal 1/44 (8 overs)

Pakistan won by concession
Zafar Ali Stadium, Sahiwal
Umpires: Javed Akhtar (Pak) and Khizer Hayat (Pak)
Player of the match: Asif Iqbal (Pak)

- Pakistan won the toss and elected to bat.
- The match was conceded by India after a number of short-pitched balls were not called wide.
- Bharath Reddy (Ind) made his ODI debut.
