= ShahSufi Habibur Rahman =

Bengali Sufi writer

Shah Sufi Habibur Rahman
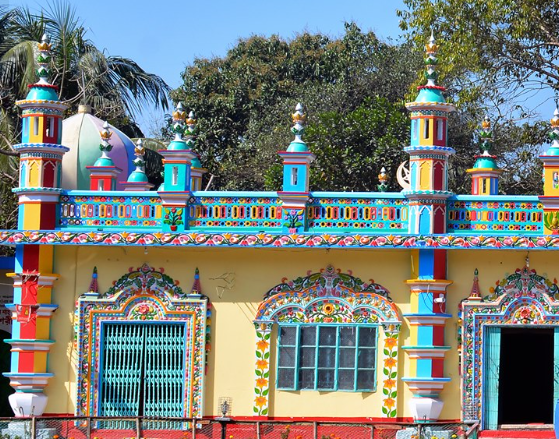
The entrance to the shrine of Shah Sufi Habibur Rahman.
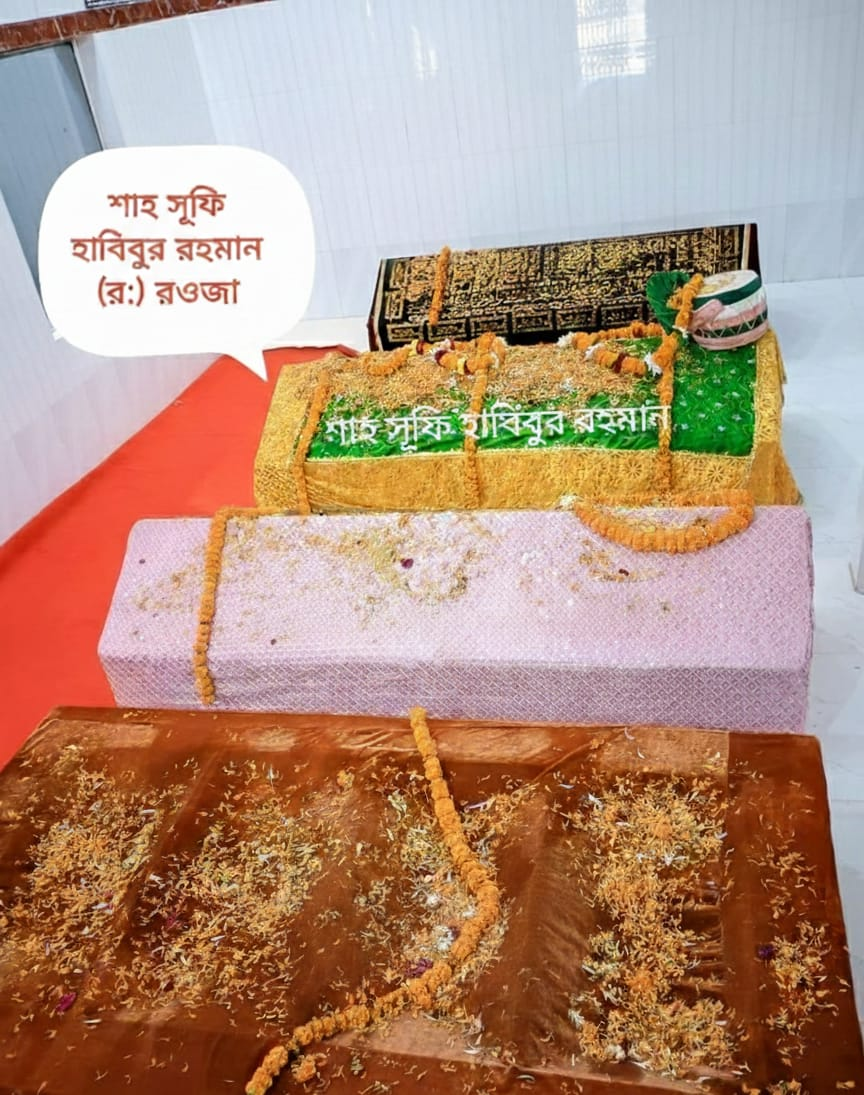
The Shrine of Shah Habibur Rahman

Personal life
- Born: Habibur Rahman; 1242 Maghi (1881 CE) Oskhain, Anwara, Chittagong, Bengal Presidency, British India
- Died: 29 Bhadra 1278 Maghi (1917 CE) Oskhain, Anwara, Chittagong, Bengal Presidency, British India
- Resting place: Shrine adjacent to Ali Raza (Kanu Shah) Dargah, Oskhain
- Parents: ShahSufi Sharafatullah (father); Syeda Ulfat Bibi (mother)
- Citizenship: Bengali
- Region: Chittagong
- Main interest(s): Sufism, Islamic theology

Religious life
- Religion: Islam
- Denomination: Sunni
- Order: Chishti, Madariyya, Naqshbandi Order, Qadiri Order
- Jurisprudence: Hanafi

Muslim leader
- Predecessor: ShahSufi Sharafatullah
- Successor: Shahsufi Aminur Rahman
- Influenced by: Ali; Ali Raza; Fariduddin Ganjshakar; Jalal al-Din Muhammad Rumi; Shah Jalal
- Influenced: Shah Sufi Peer Abdus Samad; Shah Sufi Maqbul Ali; Shamsher Ali; Lyricist Amin Sharif Munshi; Shahsufi Aminur Rahman; Nurul Rashid Akhtar Shah Noor Siddiqui; Maulana Mir Muhammad Moinuddin Noori Siddiqui Al-Quraishi

Shah Sufi Habibur Rahman (1867/1868-1885/1886) was a 19th-century Sufi figure from Chittagong who promoted the Chishti and Madariyya orders. He was the youngest son of Sufi scholar ShahSufi Sharafatullah and the grandson of medieval poet Ali Raza (known name Kanu Shah).

== Birth and Family Background ==
Habibur Rahman was born into Sufi family in Oskhain village, located on present-day Anwara Upazila of Chittagong district. He was the youngest son of ShahSufi Sharafatullah and Syeda Ulfa Bibi. His father, ShahSufi Sharafatullah, was a Sufi figure and scholar of his era, whole his grandfather Ali Raza (known name Kanu Shah) was a prominent personality in Chittagong 's Spiritual and literary traditions. Being the youngest child in the family, he was raised in a religious environment from early childhood.

== Literary and Epistemological Contributions ==
Habibur Rahman received his higher education from the religious institution Faizul Bari (established in 1831) in Deyang Pargana, where he gained proficiency in Arabic and Persian. This linguistic background is reflected in his written works. Literary researchers and his followers attribute to him the early usage of Arabic and Persian words in Bengali Sher (one kind of poetry song) and Ghazal poetry. During his lifetime of 35 years, he authored several works, notably "Gyan Pradip", "Dhyan Bahar", and various devotional texts (Wazifa). Additionally, he composed over 200 poems and ghazals set to various musical modes (rags).

== Spiritual Life and Philosophy ==
Habibur Rahman received his initial Spiritual education and authorization (Khilafat) from his father, Shah Sufi Sharafatullah. Following his father's death, he succeeded him as the head gaddinashin (Spiritual leadership) . Alongside his regular religious devotions, he frequently visited the shrines of various Sufi saints.

== Spiritual attributes and legends ==
Traditional accounts among his followers attribute several miraculous events (Karamat) to his Spiritual life. According to these traditions, the Islamic figure Khidr would appear during his religious devotions to discuss Spiritual knowledge (ilm al-Ma'rifa). Another widely, held belief among his followers is that a distinct fragrance was experienced along the paths where he walked.

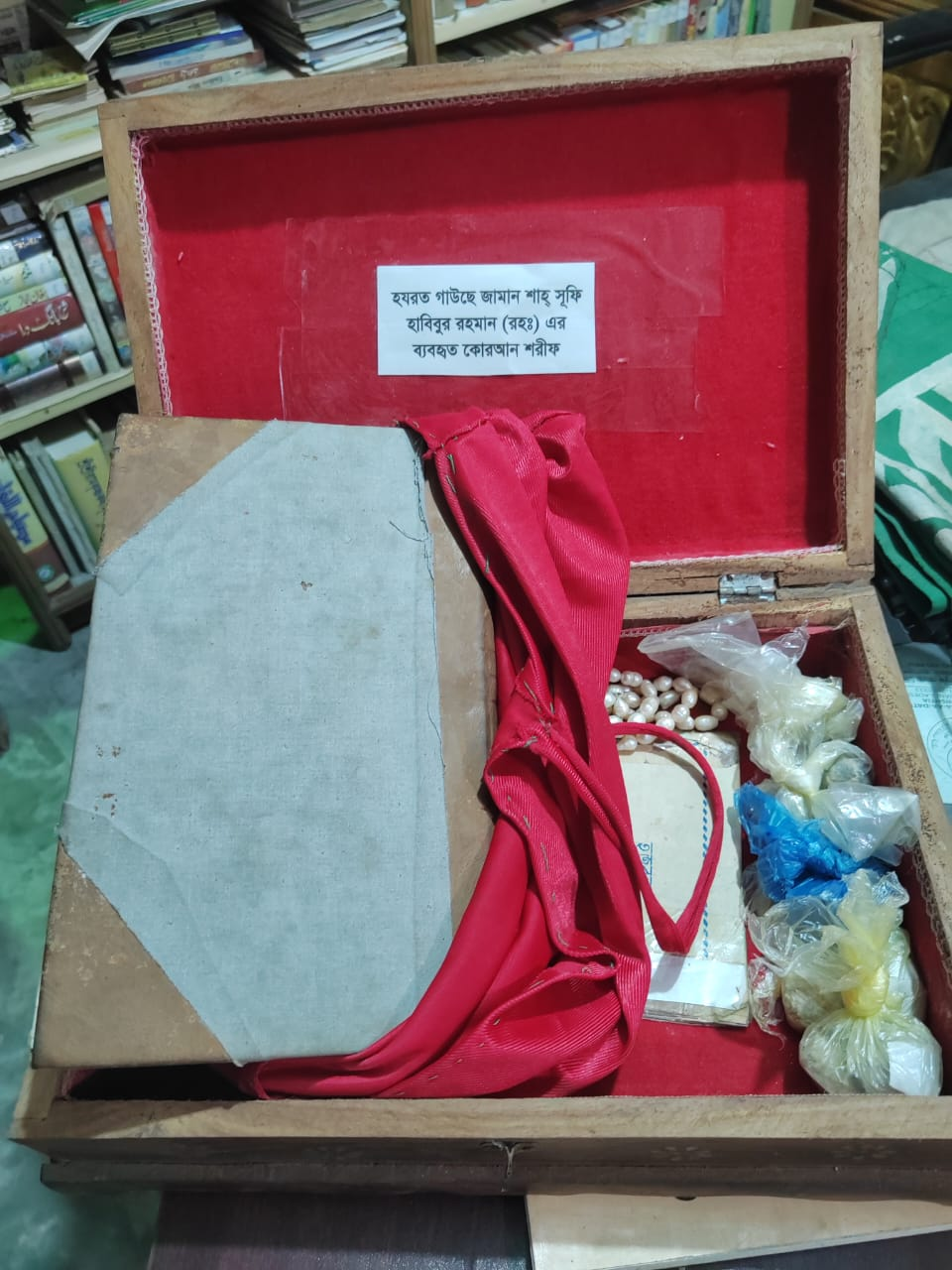
The Holy Quran used by Shah Sufi Habibur Rahman.

According to local accounts, during a pilgrimage to the shrine of the Sufi saint Fariduddin Ganjshakar in Pakpattan, Pakistan, he was spiritually accorded the title "Ghous-e-Zaman" (A Spiritual positions).

== Legacy ==
Habibur Rahman played an active role in propagating the Chishti, Madariyya, Qadiriyya, and Naqsbandi Sufi orders. During his lifetime, he granted authorization (khilafat) to 75 deputies. Among his notable deputies were Shah Sufi Maqbul ali, Amin Sharif Munshi, Maulvi Ghulam Sabur, Maulvi Shhadat Ali, and Maulvi abdul Makek, as well as his primary deputy, Shah Sufi Adbus Samad. Both Maqbul Ali and Amin Sharif Munshi composed numerous devotional songs. Following his death, he succeeded as the head Sajjadanashin (Spiritual leadership) of the order by his eldest son, Shahsufi Aminur Rahman. According to tradition among his followers, prior to his death, Habibur Rahman prophesied to his wife, Chemon Ara Bibi, regarding the future birth of his grandson, Nurul Rashid Akhtar Shah Noor Siddiqui, and entrusted his personal Quran and robe (Jubbah (Muslim garment)) for him. Similarly, he reportedly instructed Maqbul Ali to safeguard treatises for the grandson. In 1986, the only daughter of Maqbul Ali personally handed over the manuscript and certificate of succession to Nurul Rashid Akhtar Shah Noor Siddiqui.

== Death and Burial ==
Habibur Rahman died on 12 Cahitra 1292 Moghi (C.MArch 1886). He was buried alongside his father, ShahSufi Sharafatullah, in Oskhain village of Anwara Upazila, Chittagong. His shrine (Dargah) is currently located within the Oskhain Dargah Sharif complex.
