= Farooq Rasheed =

Pakistani cricketer

Farooq Rasheed فاروق رشید
Personal information
- Full name: Farooq Rasheed
- Born: 15 March 1958 (age 68); Karachi, Sindh, Pakistan
- Batting: Right-handed
- Bowling: Right-arm off spinner
- Role: Batsman, Wicket-keeper
- Relatives: Ahmed Rasheed (brother); Haroon Rasheed (brother); Mahmood Rasheed (brother); Mohtashim Rasheed (brother); Tahir Rasheed (brother); Umar Rasheed (brother)

Domestic team information
- Years: Team
- 1978/79-1984/85: Allied Bank Limited
- 1987/88: Karachi

Career statistics
Competition	FC	LA
Matches	13	6
Runs scored	343	107
Batting average	18.05	18.05
100s/50s	0/0	0/1
Top score	39	58
Balls bowled	16	0
Wickets	0	–
Bowling average	–	–
5 wickets in innings	0	–
10 wickets in match	0	–
Best bowling	–	–
Catches/stumpings	16/2	0/0
- Source: ESPNcricinfo; Pakistan Cricket (archived), 9 July 2022

Farooq Rasheed (Urdu: فاروق رشیر, born 15 October 1958 in Karachi, Sindh), known as Farooq Rasheed, is a former Pakistani cricketer.

== Domestic career ==
=== First-class career ===
Rasheed made his debut for Allied Bank Limited against Karachi Blues during the 1978/79 BCCP Patron's Trophy on 17 February 1979. In the first innings, Rasheed scored 30. In the second innings, he got figures of 0/8 (2 overs) and didn't bat as Allied Bank Limited didn't get to play their second inning. The match ended as a draw. Rasheed played his next match for Allied Bank Limited against Rawalpindi during the 1982/83 Quaid-e-Azam Trophy on 16 October 1982. In the first innings, Rasheed scored 5. In the second innings, Rasheed scored 20* as Allied Bank Limited won by 7 wickets. Rasheed played his next match against Muslim Commercial Bank on 22 October 1982. In the first innings, he scored 39. In the second innings, he didn't bowl and scored 0. Muslim Commercial Bank went on to win by 27 runs. Rasheed played his next match against Railways on 29 October 1982. In the first innings, he scored 0. In the second innings he scored 23. Allied Bank Limited won the match by 81 runs. Rasheed played his next match against Lahore City on 4 November 1982. In the first innings, he scored 6. In the second innings, he didn't bat as the match ended in a draw. Rasheed played his next match against Pakistan International Airlines on 10 November 1982. In the first innings, he scored 6. In the second innings, he scored 27*. The match resulted in a draw. Rasheed played his next match against United Bank Limited on 22 November 1982. In the first innings, he scored 1. In the second innings, he scored 0. United Bank Limited won the match by 7 wickets. Rasheed played his next match against Karachi. In the first innings, he scored 38. In the second innings, he scored 7*. The match resulted in a draw. Rasheed played his final match of the tournament against National Bank of Pakistan on 30 December 1982. In the first innings, he scored 10. In the second innings, he scored 38. National Bank of Pakistan won the match by 8 wickets. Rasheed played his next match for Allied Bank Limited against Pakistan International Airlines during the 1984/85 Quaid-e-Azam Trophy on 5 January 1985. In the first innings, he scored 8. In the second innings, he scored 25. The match ended in a draw. Rasheed played his next match of the tournament against Pakistan Automobiles Corporation on 10 January 1985. In the first innings, he scored 18*. In the second innings, he scored 14. Pakistan Automobiles Corporation won the match by 66 runs. Rasheed played his final match of the tournament against National Bank of Pakistan. In the first innings, he scored 0. In the second innings, he didn't bat as Allied Bank Limited had already won by 7 wickets. He played his final first-class match for Karachi against Pakistan National Shipping Corporation during the 1987/88 Quaid-e-Azam Trophy on 6 March 1988. In the first innings, he scored 19. In the second innings, he scored 9. Pakistan National Shipping Corporation won the match by 64 runs.

=== List A career ===
Rasheed made his List A debut for Allied Bank Limited against Muslim Commercial Bank during the 1982/83 Willis Cup on 10 February 1983. Rasheed scored 1. Muslim Commercial Bank won the match by 57 runs. Rasheed played his next match for Allied Bank Limited against Pakistan International Airlines during the 1983/84 Willis Cup on 9 February 1984. Rasheed scored 11. Pakistan International Airlines won the match by 114 runs. Rasheed played his next match against United Bank Limited on 11 February 1984. He scored 1. United Bank Limited won by 7 wickets. Rasheed played his next match against Railways on 12 February 1984. Rasheed scored 8 runs. Allied Bank Limited won the match by 152 runs. Rasheed played his next match of the tournament against State Bank of Pakistan on 15 February 1984. Rasheed scored 58. Allied Bank Limited won the match by 4 wickets. Rasheed played his final List A match against Karachi on 16 February 1984. Rasheed scored 28 runs. Karachi won the match by 24 runs.
