= Kamran Khan (Pakistani cricketer) =

Pakistani cricketer (born 1969)

Personal information
- Full name: Mohammad Kamran Khan
- Born: 14 December 1969 (age 56); Lahore, Punjab, Pakistan
- Batting: Right-handed
- Bowling: Right-arm offbreak Occasional wicketkeeper
- Relatives: Jahangir Khan (grandfather); Asad Jahangir (uncle); Majid Khan (uncle); Imran Khan (uncle); Babar Zaman (uncle); Bazid Khan (cousin)

Domestic team information
- Years: Team
- 1986/87: Pakistan International Airlines Colts
- 1987/88-1996/97: Lahore City
- 1990/91: Pakistan University Grants Commission
- 1990/91: Lahore City C
- 1991/92-1992/93: Lahore B
- 1991/92-1993/94: Pakistan Automobiles Corporation
- 1995/96-1997/98: Allied Bank Limited
- 1997/98: Islamabad
- 2001: Zaman Park Wanderers

Career statistics
Competition	First-class	List A
Matches	57	54
Runs scored	2,440	1,012
Batting average	26.52	23.53
100s/50s	5/9	2/4
Top score	152	105*
Balls bowled	52	124
Wickets	1	1
Bowling average	44.00	123.00
5 wickets in innings	0	4
10 wickets in match	0	2
Best bowling	1/12	1/9
Catches/stumpings	48/–	16/3
- Source: CricInfo, 5 January 2024

Kamran Khan (Urdu: کامران خان; born 14 December 1969) is a retired first-class and List A cricketer from Pakistan, having played 57 matches in the former and 54 in the latter format during his 12-year career.

== Early life ==
Kamran was born on 14 December 1969 into a Pashtun cricketing family of the Burki tribe. His grandfather Jahangir Khan, uncles Asad Jahangir, Majid Khan, Imran Khan, Babar Zaman and cousin Bazid Khan were all first-class cricketers.

== See also ==
- List of Pakistan Automobiles Corporation cricketers
