= List of Gujranwala cricketers =

This is a list of cricketers who have played matches for the Gujranwala cricket team.

- Imran Abbas
- Hassan Adnan
- Ijaz Ahmed
- Shakeel Ahmed
- Nadeem Ahsan
- Shakeel Ansar
- Naved Arif
- Khalid Butt
- Zulfiqar Butt
- Aleem Dar
- Munir Dar
- Inam-ul-Haq
- Majeed Jahangir
- Mujahid Jamshed
- Azhar Khan
- Tahir Mahmood
- Shoaib Malik
- Tahir Mughal
- Asim Munir
- Shahid Nazir
- Abdur Rehman
- Zahid Saeed
- Aamer Wasim
