= Tahir Rasheed (cricketer) =

Pakistani cricketer

Tahir Rasheed طاہر رشید
Personal information
- Full name: Tahir Rasheed Dar
- Born: 21 November 1960 (age 65); Karachi, Sindh, Pakistan
- Batting: Right-handed
- Bowling: Right-arm Medium
- Role: Batsman, Wicket-keeper
- Relatives: Ahmed Rasheed (brother); Farooq Rasheed (brother); Haroon Rasheed (brother); Mohtashim Rasheed (brother); Mahmood Rasheed (brother); Umar Rasheed (brother)

Domestic team information
- Years: Team
- 1979/80-1980/81: Industrial Development Bank of Pakistan
- 1981/82: Karachi
- 1983/84-1986/87: House Building Finance Corporation
- 1987/84-2003/04: Habib Bank Limited
- 1993/94-1995/96: Karachi Whites
- 1995/96-1996/97: Karachi Blues

Career statistics
Competition	FC	LA
Matches	181	130
Runs scored	5803	1492
Batting average	25.23	22.26
100s/50s	3/25	2/4
Top score	182	115
Balls bowled	85	0
Wickets	2	–
Bowling average	16.50	–
5 wickets in innings	0	–
10 wickets in match	0	–
Best bowling	1/0	–
Catches/stumpings	501/61	118/61
- Source: ESPNcricinfo; Pakistan Cricket, 10 July 2022

Tahir Rasheed is a Pakistani cricketer who hold the record for a wicket-keeper to dismiss most number of batsmen (9 dismissals, 8 caught and 1 stumped) in an innings in first-class cricket, for Habib Bank against Pakistan Automobiles Corporation at Gujranwala in 1992–93.

== See also ==
- List of Industrial Development Bank of Pakistan cricketers
