= Qaiser Hussain =

Pakistani cricketer (born 1959)

Personal information
- Born: 28 November 1959 (age 66); Karachi, Pakistan
- Batting: Right-handed
- Bowling: Right arm offbreak
- Source: Cricinfo, 19 October 2016

Qaiser Hussain (born 28 November 1959) is a Pakistani former cricketer. He played 30 first-class and 10 List A matches for several domestic teams in Pakistan, including Industrial Development Bank of Pakistan and Pakistan Automobiles Corporation, between 1980 and 1986.

== See also ==
- List of Pakistan Automobiles Corporation cricketers
- List of Industrial Development Bank of Pakistan cricketers
