= Shahid Pervez =

Pakistani cricketer

Personal information
- Full name: Shahid Pervez
- Source: ESPNcricinfo, 14 February 2017

Shahid Pervez is a Pakistani former cricketer. He played three first-class and five List A matches for Pakistan Automobiles Corporation cricket team between 1983 and 1985.

== See also ==
- List of Pakistan Automobiles Corporation cricketers
