= Zaman Park =

Neighborhood in Lahore, Pakistan

Zaman Park زمان پارک
- Neighbourhood of Lahore
- Interactive map of Zaman Park
- Coordinates: 31°33′05″N 74°21′11″E
- Country: Pakistan
- Province: Punjab
- District: Lahore
- Established: 1936 (as Sunder Das Park)
- Founder: Rai Bahadur Sunder Das Suri
- Named for: Khan Bahadur Zaman Khan
- Time zone: UTC+5 (PKT)
- Website: https://www.zamanpark.com

Zaman Park (Urdu: زمان پارک) is a neighborhood in the city of Lahore, Pakistan.

== History ==
Zaman Park, named after Khan Bahadur Mohammad Zaman Khan, the Post Master General of Punjab in British India until 1943-44, wasn't always known by this name. Earlier maps labeled the region as Punjab Light Horse (PLH) Parade Ground, part of the Cavalry Reserve in the British Indian Army. In 1936, the colony underwent a name change, adopting the name, Sunder Das Park. The area only gained its current name and houses after the construction efforts led by Rai Bahadur Sunder Das Suri and his family.

According to Javed Zaman, his family bought a home in the area in 1940.

By 1942, the area witnessed the emergence of six homes, all under the ownership of a single interconnected Hindu family.

Upon the occurrence of the 1947 Partition, Zaman Park was adorned with 15 grand, palatial residences, constructed by Lahore's elite Hindu families. The elite of the Jalandhar Pathans, originally from Waziristan, migrated to Lahore to settle in Zaman Park. The family's senior member, Khan Bahadur Zaman Khan, was a maternal uncle to the mothers of Javed Burki, Majid Khan, and Imran Khan.

== Notable residents ==
- Aitzaz Ahsan
- Imran Khan
- Ahmed Raza
- Javed Burki
- Majid Khan
- Ijaz Khan
- Kamran Khan
- Humayun Zaman
- Babar Zaman
- Javed Zaman
- Khaled Ahmed
