= Junaid Alvi =

Pakistani cricketer (born 1965)

Personal information
- Born: 25 December 1965 (age 60); Karachi, Pakistan
- Source: Cricinfo, 18 October 2016

Junaid Alvi (born 25 December 1965) is a Pakistani former cricketer who played as a right-handed batsman. He played eighteen first-class cricket matches for Pakistan Automobiles Corporation between 1983 and 1987.

== See also ==
- List of Pakistan Automobiles Corporation cricketers
