= Mohammad Ayub =

Mohammad Ayub may refer to:

- Mohammad Ayub Khan (1907–1974), Pakistani general and president
- Mohammad Ayub (cricketer, born 1965), Indian cricketer
- Mohammad Ayub (Bagram captive 2006, son of Mohammad Usman), listed on a habeas petition, see List of Bagram captives
- Mohammed Ayub (born 1984), a Uyghur, formerly held in the Guantanamo Bay detention camps, in Cuba
- Mohammed Ayub (Bagram captive 2006, son of Kareem Khan), listed on a habeas petition, see List of Bagram captives
- Mohammad Ayub (Pakistani cricketer) (born 1979), Pakistani cricketer
- Master Ayub, Pakistani teacher who runs an open air, free of cost, school in Islamabad since 1986
- Mohamed Ayub, Indian politician

== See also ==
- Muhammad Ayub (disambiguation)
