= Ahmed Rasheed =

Ahmed Rasheed may refer to:

- Ahmed Rasheed (footballer), Maldivian footballer
- Ahmed Rasheed (cricketer), Pakistani first class cricketer
