= Tanveer Ahmed =

Tanveer Ahmed may refer to:

- Tanveer Ahmed (footballer) (born 1976), Pakistani footballer
- Tanveer Ahmed (boxer) (born 1968), Pakistani boxer
- Tanveer Ahmed (cricketer) (born 1997), Hong Kong cricketer
- Tanveer Ahmed (psychiatrist) (born 1974), Australian psychiatrist and television personality
- Tanveer Ahmed, Sunni Muslim convicted of the religiously motivated hate killing of Asad Shah in Glasgow, Scotland

== See also ==
- Tanvir Ahmed (born 1978), Pakistani Test cricketer
- Tanvir Ahmed (cricketer, born 1963), Pakistani domestic cricketer
- Tanvir Ahmed (umpire), (born 1972), Bangladesh cricket umpire
- Tanvir Ahmed (admiral), Pakistan Navy officer
