= Mohammad Afzal (cricketer, born 1955) =

Pakistani cricketer (born 1955)

Personal information
- Born: 6 June 1955 (age 71); Kenya
- Batting: Right-handed
- Bowling: Right-arm off-spin
- Role: Batsman

Domestic team information
- Years: Team
- 1975–1976: Hyderabad
- 1975: Pakistan Universities
- 1977: Sindh B
- 1981–1985: Cambridgeshire (England)
- 1981: Industrial Development Bank
- Source: CricketArchive, 11 March 2016

Mohammad Afzal (born 6 June 1955) is a Pakistani former cricketer who played for several teams in Pakistani domestic cricket, and later also in England. He played as a right-handed top-order batsman.

Afzal was born in Kenya, but never played high-level cricket there. He made his first-class debut in Pakistan in August 1975, scoring 71 not out for Hyderabad against Sukkur in the Sikandar Ali Bhutto Cup. Later in the 1975–76 season, Afzal represented the Pakistan Universities team in the BCCP Patron's Trophy and Quaid-i-Azam Trophy, playing three matches in the former competition and one in the latter. In a Patron's Trophy match against Lahore B, he made 101 not out, which was to be his highest first-class score and only century. For the 1976–77 Quaid-i-Azam Trophy, Afzal switched to Sindh B, although he played only a single game for that team (against the National Bank of Pakistan).

Beginning in 1981, Afzal made occasional appearances for Cambridgeshire in England's Minor Counties Championship. He never managed a full season, however, last playing for Cambridgeshire in 1985. Back in Pakistan, Afzal's final first-class appearances came in the 1981–82 Quaid-i-Azam Trophy, when he represented the Industrial Development Bank team. He played in all nine of his team's matches, and scored 309 runs with a best of 43 against Karachi. Among his teammates, only Saleem Yousuf and Ashfaq Malik scored more runs that season. Afzal finished with a career first-class batting average of 25.25, from 17 matches.
