= Mohtashim Rasheed =

Pakistani cricket coach (born 1968)

Personal information
- Full name: Mohtashim Rasheed Dar
- Born: 22 September 1968 (age 58); Karachi, Sindh, Pakistan
- Nickname: Moti
- Batting: Right-handed
- Bowling: Left-arm orthodox spin
- Role: All-rounder
- Relatives: Ahmed Rasheed (brother); Farooq Rasheed (brother); Haroon Rasheed (brother); Mahmood Rasheed (brother); Tahir Rasheed (brother); Umar Rasheed (brother)

Domestic team information
- Years: Team
- 1993/94: House Building Finance Corporation
- 1995/96: Hyderabad
- 1996/97: Karachi Blues
- 1998/99–1999/00: Pakistan National Shipping Corporation
- 2000/01–2004/05: Pakistan Customs
- 2001/02: Rest of Baluchistan
- LA debut: 29 October 1993 House Building Finance Corporation v National Bank of Pakistan
- Last LA: 28 December 2003 Pakistan Customs v Defence Housing Authority
- FC debut: 6 November 1993 House Building Finance Corporation v United Bank Limited
- Last FC: 22 February 2005 Pakistan Customs v Habib Bank Limited

Career statistics
Competition	First-class	List A
Matches	23	18
Runs scored	532	79
Batting average	15.64	7.90
100s/50s	0/3	0/0
Top score	76	19
Balls bowled	1,381	846
Wickets	48	21
Bowling average	71.66	24.42
5 wickets in innings	2	1
10 wickets in match	0	0
Best bowling	6/110	5/22
Catches/stumpings	10/–	3/–
- Source: ESPNcricinfo, 21 June 2022

Mohtashim Rasheed Dar (Urdu: محتشم رشید ڈار) (born 22 September 1968), known as Mohtashim Rasheed, also spelled as Mauhtashim Rasheed, is a Pakistani cricket coach and former cricketer.

== Domestic career ==
Rasheed made his List A debut for House Building Finance Corporation against the National Bank of Pakistan on 29 October 1993 in the Patron's Trophy. He made his first-class debut for House Building Finance Corporation against United Bank Limited on 6 November 1993 in the Patron's Trophy. Rasheed played domestic cricket until 2005.

== Coaching career ==
Rasheed first served as Pakistan's fielding coach from 2007 to 2008. He was appointed Pakistan's assistant coach for the 2009 ICC Champions Trophy. Rasheed served as the Pakistan women's team's head coach from 2012 to 2016. He served in Peshawar Zalmi's coaching staff for the 2017 edition

of Pakistan Super League. Rasheed was appointed the coach of the Qatari cricket team for the duration of the 2017 ICC World Cricket League Division Five. Rasheed served as Muzaffarabad Tigers' head coach in 2021. Rasheed coached South Coast Sapphires during the 2022 FairBreak Invitational T20.
