= Fakhruddin Baloch =

Pakistani cricketer (born 1967)

Personal information
- Born: 8 January 1967 (age 59); Lyari Town, Pakistan
- Source: ESPNcricinfo, 18 October 2016

Fakhruddin Baloch (born 8 January 1967) is a Pakistani former cricketer. He played first-class cricket for Karachi Whites and Pakistan Automobiles Corporation between 1989 and 1992, mainly as a right-arm fast medium bowler.

== See also ==
- List of Pakistan Automobiles Corporation cricketers
