= Pakistan University Grants Commission cricket team =

Sponsored university cricket team in Pakistan

Pakistan University Grants Commission were a first-class cricket team, sponsored by the body that is now the Higher Education Commission of Pakistan, that played in the Patron's Trophy in 1990-91 and 1991–92.

They played a total of 14 first-class matches, with two wins, nine losses and three draws. They finished seventh out of eight in 1990–91, winning two matches and losing five. In 1991-92 they finished last, with four losses and two draws. They also played a drawn first-class match against the touring England A team in 1990–91.

The captain in 1990-91 was Shahid Khan, and in 1991-92 it was Ahmed Munir. Mujahid Jamshed hit the team's only two centuries, with a highest of 149 against National Bank of Pakistan. Shahid Khan had the best bowling figures, 7 for 79 against Pakistan National Shipping Corporation.

The team also played 22 List A matches in the same two seasons, winning four and losing 18.

In 1990-91 they played all their first-class and List A matches at the Punjab University Old Campus Ground, Lahore. In 1991-92 they played no home matches.

Note: In Wisden Cricketers' Almanack the team was called “Combined Universities”.

== Notable cricketers ==
- Ghulam Ali (cricketer)
- Aziz-ur-Rehman (cricketer, born 1966)
- Afzaal Haider
- Mujahid Jamshed
- Kamran Khan (Pakistani cricketer)
- Maqsood Rana
