= Alauddin (cricketer) =

Pakistani cricketer (born 1976)

Personal information
- Born: 7 July 1976 (age 50); Lahore, Pakistan
- Source: Cricinfo, 16 February 2017

Alauddin (born 7 July 1976) is a Pakistani former cricketer. He played seven first-class matches for Pakistan National Shipping Corporation cricket team between 1993/94 and 1995/96.

== See also ==
- List of Pakistan National Shipping Corporation cricketers
