= Aziz-ur-Rehman (cricketer, born 1966) =

Pakistani cricketer

Personal information
- Full name: Mohammad Aziz-ur-Rehman
- Born: 31 March 1966 (age 60); Sargodha, Pakistan
- Batting: Left-handed
- Bowling: Slow left-arm orthodox

Domestic team information
- Years: Team
- 1983-84 to 1992-93: Sargodha
- 1990-91 to 1991-92: Pakistan University Grants Commission
- 1993-94: Railways

Career statistics
Competition	FC	List A
Matches	62	46
Runs scored	1760	695
Batting average	19.77	21.06
100s/50s	0/10	0/0
Top score	84 not out	45
Balls bowled	10,178	1597
Wickets	219	45
Bowling average	21.14	25.44
5 wickets in innings	15	0
10 wickets in match	3
Best bowling	7/45	3/17
Catches/stumpings	33/–	9/–
- Source: Cricket Archive, 17 September 2014

Aziz-ur-Rehman (born 31 March 1966) is a former Pakistani cricketer who played first-class cricket from 1983 to 1993.

A left-arm slow bowler, Aziz-ur-Rehman made his first-class debut in the 1983-84 season. In the first match of the 1984-85 season, competing in the Patron's Trophy, he took 7 for 45 for Sargodha in the second innings against Faisalabad to give Sargodha victory by 142 runs. In the next match a few days later against Gujranwala he took 6 for 70 and 5 for 74 in a victory by 19 runs. With 34 wickets at 15.35, he was the leading wicket-taker in the competition that season. He took his best match figures, and established the Sargodha record, in 1989-90 against Karachi Whites, with 13 for 78 (7 for 47 and 6 for 31).

Initially he played purely as a bowler, but later in his career he developed as an all-rounder. In his final match for Sargodha, the Quaid-e-Azam Trophy final in 1992-93, he opened the batting in the second innings and top-scored with 67. His top score was 84 not out, for Pakistan University Grants Commission against Pakistan Automobiles Corporation in 1991-92.
