= Farrukh Bari =

Pakistani cricketer (born 1964)

Personal information
- Born: 4 September 1964 (age 62); Karachi, Pakistan
- Source: Cricinfo, 16 February 2017

Farrukh Bari (born 4 September 1964) is a Pakistani former cricketer. He played 45 first-class and 29 List A matches for Pakistan National Shipping Corporation cricket team between 1987/88 and 1994/95.

== See also ==
- List of Pakistan National Shipping Corporation cricketers
