= Mohammad Aslam (Punjab cricketer) =

Pakistani cricketer (born 1975)

Personal information
- Born: 15 January 1975 (age 51); Lahore, Pakistan
- Source: ESPNcricinfo, 19 October 2016

Mohammad Aslam (born 15 January 1975) is a Pakistani former cricketer. He played 14 first-class and 13 List A matches for several domestic teams in Pakistan between 1993 and 1996. He mainly played for Pakistan Automobiles Corporation, Pakistan Railways, and Rawalpindi.

== See also ==
- List of Pakistan Automobiles Corporation cricketers
