= Shahzad Bashir =

Shahzad Bashir may refer to:

- Shahzad Bashir (cricketer)
- Shahzad Bashir (scholar)
