= Dara Bashir =

Pakistani cricketer (born 1960)

Personal information
- Full name: Dara Bashir Khan
- Born: 1 May 1960 (age 66); Karachi, Pakistan
- Source: ESPNcricinfo, 18 October 2016

Dara Bashir Khan (born 1 May 1960, Karachi, Sindh) is a Pakistani former first-class cricketer. He played thirteen first-class cricket matches for several domestic sides in Pakistan between 1977 and 1984. He also represented Pakistan national under-19 cricket team.

== Early life and education ==
Dara Bashir Khan was born on 1 May 1960 in Karachi, Sindh. He was educated at Habib Public School.

== Career ==
Khan began his cricketing career with the Pakistan International Airlines (PIA), where he played first-class cricket from the 1979/80 season until 1983/84. He also made List A cricket appearances for PIA during the 1980/81 season. From there, he moved to Karachi Blues to continue playing first-class cricket for the 1983/84 season. His subsequent career saw him playing List A for the Pakistan Automobiles Corporation from the 1986/87 to 1987/88 seasons. Earlier, he also played the Under-19 Test cricket for Pakistan Under-19s during the 1978/79 season.

During his first-class career, Khan played 13 matches, taking 20 wickets with a best performance of 4-59. He also scored 78 runs with a high score of 45, and In his List-A career, he played five matches and took eight wickets with a best of 3-24. As a part of the Pakistan Under-19s, Khan played five matches, taking 12 wickets with 3-17 being his best bowling performance.

== See also ==
- List of Pakistan Automobiles Corporation cricketers
