= G. M. Ahmed =

Pakistani cricketer (born 1959)

Personal information
- Born: 17 February 1959 (age 67); Karachi, Pakistan
- Source: Cricinfo, 18 October 2016

G. M. Ahmed (born 17 February 1959) is a Pakistani former cricketer. He played three first-class cricket matches for Pakistan Automobiles Corporation between 1983 and 1985.

== See also ==
- List of Pakistan Automobiles Corporation cricketers
