= Fayyaz =

Fayyaz is a surname and a given name. Notable people with the name include:

Surname:

- Ali-Akbar Fayyaz (1898–1971), professor at Tehran University
- Amna Fayyaz (born 2002), Pakistani professional squash player
- Anum Fayyaz, Pakistani former television actress and model
- Mahar Muhammad Fayyaz, Pakistani politician
- Mahmoud Fayyaz (1925–2002), Egyptian Olympic champion weightlifter
- Mian Fayyaz (born 1959), Pakistani cricketer
- Mohammad Fayyaz (born 1984), Pakistani first-class cricketer
- Mohammadi Fayyaz, Sufi saint, successor of Muhibbullah Allahabadi
- Muhammad Fayyaz (born 1967), Pakistani sprinter
- Salman Fayyaz (born 1997), Pakistani cricketer

Given name:

- Raja Muhammad Fayyaz Ahmad (born 1946), judge in Supreme Court of Pakistan
- Fayyaz Ahmed (born 1983), Pakistani-born cricketer
- Fayyaz Ahmed (Pakistani cricketer) (born 1988), Pakistani cricketer
- Qari Fayyaz-ur-Rehman Alvi, Pakistani politician
- Fayyaz Butt (born 1993), Pakistani-born cricketer
- Fayyaz ul Hassan Chohan, Pakistani politician
- Sheikh Fayyaz Ud Din (born 1945), Pakistani politician
- Fayyaz Gilani HI(M) SI(M) is a retired Pakistani naval attaché and vice admiral
- Fayyaz Hashmi (1920–2011), Pakistani poet and screenwriter

== See also ==
- Fayyaz Park, recreational public park in Muzaffargarh, Pakistan
