= P. R. Man Singh =

Indian cricketer and administrator

PR Man Singh
Personal information
- Born: 24 November 1938 (age 87)
- Batting: Right-handed
- Bowling: Right-arm off break

Domestic team information
- Years: Team
- 1965/66: Hyderabad

Career statistics
Competition	First-class
Matches	5
Runs scored	57
Batting average	9.50
100s/50s	0/0
Top score	27*
Balls bowled	120
Wickets	1
Bowling average	59.00
5 wickets in innings	0
10 wickets in match	0
Best bowling	1/32
Catches/stumpings	1/0
Medal record
Men's Cricket
Representing India as Manager
ICC Cricket World Cup
Winner	1983 England and Wales
- Source: ESPNcricinfo, 26 December 2019

PR Man Singh (born 24 November 1938) is an Indian former cricket player and administrator. He was the manager of the Indian team that won the 1983 Cricket World Cup, and also managed the Indian team which reached the semi-finals at the 1987 Cricket World Cup. He later served as the secretary of the Hyderabad Cricket Association.

== Career ==
A right-handed batsman and off break bowler, Man Singh played five first-class matches between 1965/66 and 1968/69, representing Hyderabad in the Ranji Trophy and Hyderabad Blues in the Moin-ud-Dowlah Gold Cup Tournament.

Man Singh became an administrator after his playing career. He worked as the assistant team manager for India on its tour to Pakistan in 1978. He was selected as the manager for the 1983 Cricket World Cup, after securing a 15–13 win over Niranjan Shah in a special BCCI general meeting vote for the post. He was part of the six-member selection committee that appointed Kapil Dev as the captain for the tournament. Man Singh and Kapil Dev were then involved in the World Cup squad selection. India went on to lift the World Cup, despite being tipped as massive underdogs at the start of the tournament when bookmakers' odds was at 66-1 for an Indian win.

After India's World Cup victory, Man Singh reportedly wrote a letter to Wisden Cricket Monthly's editor David Frith, who had downplayed India's chances before the tournament and declared that he would "eat his words" if India won the tournament, reminding him of his "promise". The September 1983 edition of the magazine ran a copy of Man Singh's letter along with a photograph of Frith with a piece of paper in his mouth, captioned, "India made me eat my words".

Man Singh went on to manage the Indian team at the 1987 Cricket World Cup in the subcontinent where India reached the semi-finals. Later, he managed Hyderabad Blues in the Moin-ud-Dowlah Tournament and served as the secretary of the Hyderabad Cricket Association.

== Personal life ==
Man Singh's residence in Karkhana, Secunderabad, named "Pavilion", houses a cricket memorabilia room which was inaugurated by Sachin Tendulkar in 2003. The collection includes hundreds of books, ties, bats and souvenirs which he had assembled since the 1950s.

== In popular culture ==
The 2021 Indian film 83, which is based on India's World Cup win, features Pankaj Tripathi portraying Man Singh's character. In the film, the character speaks in Hyderabadi dialect.
