= Mustaqeem Ahmed =

Pakistani cricketer (born 1978)

Personal information
- Born: 24 December 1978 (age 47); Lahore, Pakistan
- Source: Cricinfo, 19 October 2016

Mustaqeem Ahmed (born 24 December 1978) is a Pakistani former cricketer. He played eight first-class and four List A matches for several domestic teams in Pakistan between 1993 and 2003.

== See also ==
- List of Pakistan Automobiles Corporation cricketers
