= Mahmood Rasheed =

Pakistani cricketer (born 1955)

Mahmood Rasheed محمود رشید
Personal information
- Full name: Mahmood Rasheed Dar
- Born: 22 June 1955 (age 71); Karachi, Sindh, Pakistan
- Batting: Right-handed
- Bowling: Right-arm Medium
- Role: Batsman
- Relatives: Ahmed Rasheed (brother); Farooq Rasheed (brother); Haroon Rasheed (brother); Mohtashim Rasheed (brother); Tahir Rasheed (brother); Umar Rasheed (brother)

Domestic team information
- Years: Team
- 1976/77-1983/84: Karachi Blues
- 1976/77: Karachi Whites
- 1978/79-1992/93: United Bank Limited

Umpiring information
- T20Is umpired: 1 (2007–2007)

Career statistics
Competition	FC	LA
Matches	87	40
Runs scored	3085	522
Batting average	24.68	20.07
100s/50s	3/15	0/2
Top score	116*	57*
Balls bowled	196	78
Wickets	3	1
Bowling average	33.66	54.00
5 wickets in innings	0	0
10 wickets in match	0	0
Best bowling	2/14	1/35
Catches/stumpings	114/–	12/–
- Source: ESPNcricinfo; Pakistan Cricket, 10 July 2022

Mahmood Rasheed (born 22 June 1955) is a Pakistani former cricketer, cricket referee, coach and umpire. Rasheed was a right-handed batsman who bowled right-arm medium pace. He was born in Karachi, Sindh into a cricketing family. His brothers Ahmed Rasheed, Farooq Rasheed, Haroon Rasheed, Mohtashim Rasheed, Tahir Rasheed and Umar Rasheed all played first-class cricket.

Rasheed made his first-class debut for Karachi Blues in the 1976–77 season, and later played domestic cricket mainly for Karachi sides and United Bank Limited.

Rasheed played in the strong United Bank side of the 1980s, alongside players such as Sadiq Mohammad, Saeed Anwar, Shafiq Ahmed and Ashraf Ali. In the final of the 1984–85 Quaid-e-Azam Trophy, held at Gaddafi Stadium, Lahore, he appeared for United Bank against Railways.

After his playing career, Rasheed moved into officiating and coaching. He served as a match referee in Pakistan domestic cricket, refereeing 40 first-class and 23 List A matches, and in October 2007 he umpired a Twenty20 International between Singapore and Hong Kong in the 2007 ACC Twenty20 Cup. In 2008, he was appointed chief coach of United Bank Limited's side for the Patron's Trophy Grade-II competition.
