= Farrukh Raza =

Pakistani cricketer (born 1961)

Personal information
- Born: 23 March 1961 (age 65); Sargodha, Pakistan
- Batting: Right-handed
- Role: Wicket-keeper
- Source: Cricinfo, 18 October 2016

Farrukh Raza (born 23 March 1961) is a Pakistani former cricketer. He played thirteen first-class cricket matches for several domestic sides in Pakistan between 1984 and 1987.

== See also ==
- List of Pakistan Automobiles Corporation cricketers
