= Shah Sufi Sharafatullah =

Sufi poet

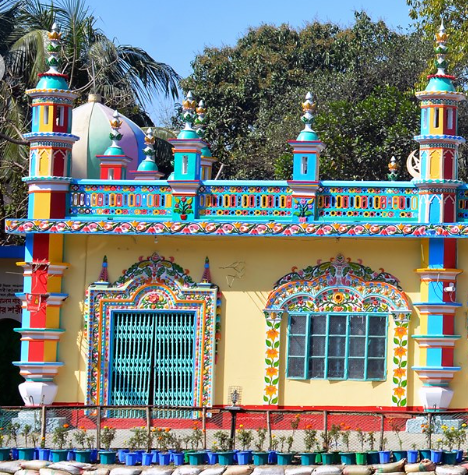
- Entrance to the Shrine of Shah Sufi Sharafatullah

Personal life
- Born: Sharafatullah; 1816 Oskhain, Anwara, Chittagong, Bengal Presidency, British India
- Died: 1864 (aged 47–48) Oskhain, Anwara, Chittagong, Bengal Presidency, British India
- Resting place: Southern chamber of Ali Raza Dargah, Oskhain, Anwara, Chittagong
- Parents: Ali Raza (father); Akim Bibi (mother)
- Region: Chittagong
- Main interest(s): Fiqh, Sufism, Tafsir, Hadith

Religious life
- Religion: Islam
- Denomination: Sunni
- Order: Chishti, Madariyya, Sabiriyya, Naqshbandi, Qadiriyya
- Philosophy: Sufism
- Jurisprudence: Hanafi

Muslim leader
- Predecessor: Ali Raza
- Successor: Shah Sufi Habibur Rahman
- Influenced by: Abu Bakr; Ali; Umar; Shah Amanat; Ali Raza; Bayazid Bastami; Jalal al-Din Muhammad Rumi
- Influenced: Peer Abdur Rahman; Shah Sufi Habibur Rahman; Shah Abdul Hai; Ashraf Ali; Nurul Rashid Akhtar Shah Noor Siddiqui

Shah Sufi Sharafatullah, popularly known as Bura Miah, was a 19th-century Sufi figure, linguist, and mystic poet from Chittagong, Bengal. He was the son of medieval poet Ali Raza (known as Kanu Shah).

== Birth and Family Background ==
Shah Sufi Sharafatullah was born in 1177 Moghi (1876 ) in Oskhain vullage, located in the Dayang Pargana of Chittagong (present-day Anwara Upazila). He was the youngest child of Ali Raza from his second marriage.

== Spiritual Life and Spiritual Practice ==
Sharafatullah was regarded by his followers as a spiritual figure within the Khidriyya tradition. According to traditional biographical accounts describe him displaying spiritual inclinations from an early age and spending twelve years engaged in secluded devotion (Khalwa). Local accounts also associated him with extensive fasting and nightly prayers during this period.

== Literary and Epistemological Contributions ==
He was knowledgeable in Arabic, Persian, Devanagari, and Bengali. His notable literary works include the spiritual text "Suratname-o-Amliyate La Sani" and over 500 compositions consisting of poems and ghazals set to various musical modes (rags).

He also produced a handwritten manuscript of the Quran, which is preserved at the Buro Maulana Shah Jame Mosque in Raozan Upazila , Chittagong.

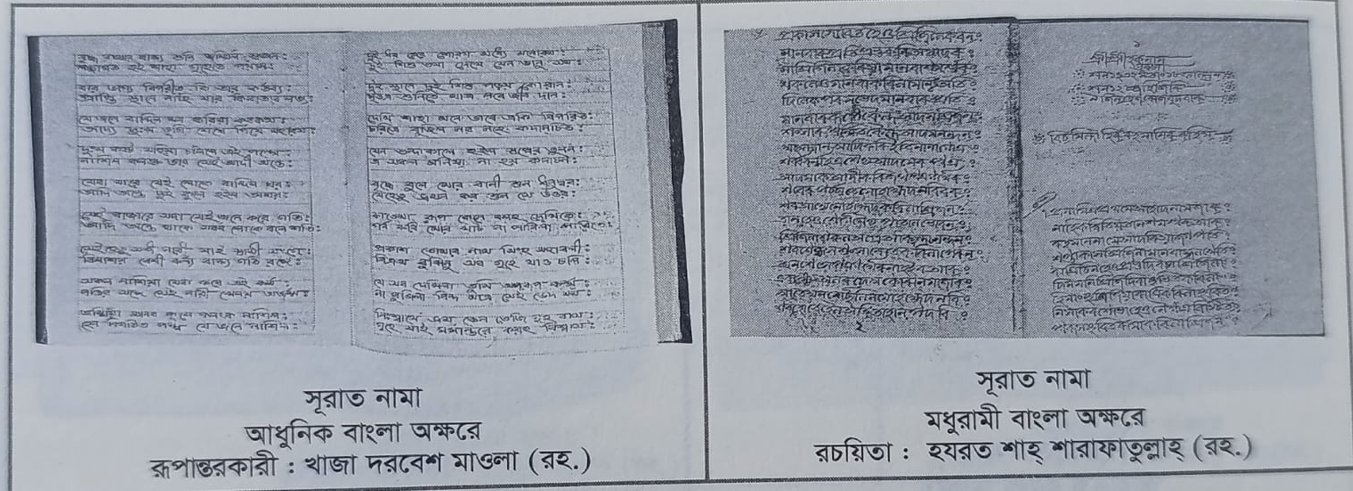
A manuscript of the *Suratnama* transliterated into modern Bengali.

== Historical inconsistency regarding the year of birth ==
Discrepancies exist regarding Sharafatullah's birth and death dates in local historical literature. In "Deyang Porganar Itihas" (PP. 292, 297), it is stated that he died around 1850 at the age of 80, which would place his birth around 1770. However, as his father Ali Raza was borin in 1759, this timeline suggests an 11-year age gap between father and son, which researches view as improbable and attribute ti typographical or informant errors. Family tradition and local biographical consensus maintain his birth year as 1816 (1177 Moghi calendar).

== Succession and the Caliphs ==
Sharafatullah designated 35 deputies (khalifas) to spread his spiritual teachings and lineage. Among his notable deputies were: Haider Ali Shah (Kulalpara, Chandanaish Upazila ), Ashraf Ali Shah (Maheskhali), Belayet Ali Shah ( popularly known as HAri Fakir Shah), Ludi Fakir Hissein Shah, Ali shah, Abdul Hai Shah, Abdur Rahman Shah, Ebadullah Pandit, Azizur Rahman Shah, Alauddin Shah.

Following his death, he was succeeded as the head (gaddinashin) of his spiritual seat by his youngest son, Shah Sufi Habibur Rahman.

== Death and Burial ==
Sharafatullah died in Oskhain village and was buried in a chamber on the southern side of the Shrine complex (Dargah) adjacent to his father Ali Raza's tomb. হয়।
