= Yahya Toor =

Pakistani cricketer (born 1962)

Personal information
- Born: 20 January 1962 (age 64); Karachi, Pakistan
- Source: Cricinfo, 14 February 2017

Yahya Toor (born 20 January 1962) is a Pakistani former cricketer. He played 72 first-class and 70 List A matches for several domestic teams in Pakistan between 1976 and 1994.

== See also ==
- List of Pakistan Automobiles Corporation cricketers
