= Tanvir Ali =

Pakistani cricketer (born 1963)

Personal information
- Born: 1 November 1963 (age 63); Karachi, Sindh, Pakistan
- Batting: Right-handed
- Bowling: Slow left-arm orthodox

Domestic team information
- Years: Team
- 1980-81 to 1981-82: Industrial Development Bank of Pakistan
- 1982-83 to 1985-86: Karachi
- 1986-97 to 1994-95: Pakistan International Airlines

Career statistics
Competition	FC	List A
Matches	83	36
Runs scored	573	42
Batting average	8.07	7.00
100s/50s	0/1	0/0
Top score	51	9
Balls bowled	15,737	1578
Wickets	286	35
Bowling average	25.28	29.11
5 wickets in innings	19	0
10 wickets in match	3	–
Best bowling	8/28	4/5
Catches/stumpings	29/–	6/–
- Source: Cricinfo, 26 February 2015

Tanvir Ali (born 1 November 1963 in Karachi, Pakistan) is a Pakistani former cricketer who played first-class cricket from 1980 to 1994.

In Ali's second first-class match, for Industrial Development Bank of Pakistan against Pakistan International Airlines in 1980–81, he took 7 for 76 and 6 for 69 with his left-arm spin.

In 1984–85, playing for Karachi, Ali took eight wickets in an innings three times. In the Quaid-e-Azam Trophy, he took 8 for 83 in the first innings against Pakistan Automobiles Corporation, and 6 for 122 and 8 for 93 against House Building Finance Corporation. Later in the season, in the PACO Cup, he took 8 for 87 against Habib Bank. He finished the season with 72 wickets at an average of 24.59.

In 1986-87, Ali took 64 wickets at an average of 18.23. Now playing for Pakistan International Airlines, he took his best figures of 8 for 28 (and 13 for 106 in the match) against Water and Power Development Authority. He continued to play for Pakistan International Airlines until 1994–95.
