= Nadeem Moosa =

Pakistani cricketer (born 1962)

Personal information
- Born: 8 December 1962 (age 63); Karachi, Pakistan
- Source: Cricinfo, 19 October 2016

Nadeem Moosa (born 8 December 1962) is a Pakistani former cricketer. He played 29 first-class and 23 List A matches for several domestic teams in Pakistan between 1983 and 1996.

== See also ==
- List of Pakistan Automobiles Corporation cricketers
