= Shahzad Bashir (cricketer) =

Pakistani cricketer

Personal information
- Full name: Shahzad Bashir
- Source: ESPNcricinfo, 14 February 2017

Shahzad Bashir is a Pakistani former cricketer. He played eighteen first-class matches for Lahore and Pakistan Automobiles Corporation cricket team between 1981 and 1985.

== See also ==
- List of Pakistan Automobiles Corporation cricketers
