= Kashif Ahmed =

Pakistani cricketer (born 1975)

Personal information
- Full name: Kashif Ahmed
- Born: 17 November 1975 (age 50); Karachi, Sindh Province, Pakistan
- Batting: Right-handed
- Bowling: Right-arm off break
- Relatives: Tauseef Ahmed (uncle)

International information
- National side: UAE

Domestic team information
- Years: Team
- 1994/95–1998/99: Karachi
- 1996/97: Pakistan Customs
- 1998/99–1999/00: Pakistan National Shipping Corporation

Career statistics
Competition	First-class	List A
Matches	38	21
Runs scored	1,366	334
Batting average	21.20	16.70
100s/50s	1/4	0/2
Top score	111*	64
Balls bowled	402	425
Wickets	5	13
Bowling average	33.00	20.92
5 wickets in innings	0	0
10 wickets in match	0	0
Best bowling	2/20	4/23
Catches/stumpings	32/–	8/–
- Source: CricketArchive, 25 January 2011

Kashif Ahmed (born 17 November 1975) is a Pakistani-born cricketer who played for the United Arab Emirates national cricket team.

Kashif Ahmed is a right-handed batsman and a right-arm off-break bowler. He played in 38 first-class and 21 List A matches for various domestic teams in Pakistan between 1995 and 2000, in Quaid-e-Azam Trophy, Pentangular Trophy and PCB Patron's Trophy matches. He has scored a century in his second first-class match, carrying his bat for Karachi Whites against Rawalpindi A in November 1995, and took four wickets in a List A match once, playing for Pakistan National Shipping Corporation against Pakistan International Airlines in March 2000.

He represented Pakistan at the 1998 Commonwealth Games and in two matches of the Under-19s tour to New Zealand in 1995, but has not played in Test cricket or One Day Internationals for the Pakistani cricket team.

Despite a series of good scores, he could not break into the Pakistan senior team. He soon got an offer to play England league cricket and played for Townville Cricket Club for two years.

In 2005, he played in the ICC Intercontinental Cup for the United Arab Emirates cricket team.
