= Sohail Khan (cricketer, born 1967) =

Pakistani cricketer (born 1967)

Personal information
- Born: 23 June 1967 (age 59); Lahore, Pakistan
- Source: Cricinfo, 24 October 2016

Sohail Khan (born 23 June 1967) is a Pakistani former cricketer. He played 34 first-class and 18 List A matches for several domestic teams in Pakistan between 1983 and 1994.

== See also ==
- List of Pakistan Automobiles Corporation cricketers
