= Muhammad Ayub =

Muhammad Ayub may refer to:

- Muhammad Ayub (athlete) (1932–2008), Pakistani athlete
- Muhammad Ayub Khuhro (1901–1980), Pakistani politician
- Muhammad Ayub Sheikh, Pakistani politician

== See also ==
- Mohammad Ayub (disambiguation)
