= Mohammad Zahid (cricketer, born 1966) =

Pakistani cricketer (born 1966)

Personal information
- Born: 11 April 1966 (age 60); Bahawalpur, Pakistan
- Source: Cricinfo, 19 October 2016

Mohammad Zahid (born 11 April 1966) is a Pakistani former cricketer. He played 150 first-class and 97 List A matches for several domestic teams in Pakistan between 1985 and 2005. He mainly played as a slow left-arm orthodox bowler, and was a good enough bowler to claim 564 first-class wickets at 21.83, and 130 List-A wickets at 23.65.

== See also ==
- List of Pakistan Automobiles Corporation cricketers
