= Umar Rasheed =

Pakistani cricketer (born 1962)

Umar Rasheed عمر رشید
Personal information
- Full name: Umar Rasheed Dar
- Born: 25 December 1962 (age 63); Karachi, Sindh, Pakistan
- Batting: Right-handed
- Bowling: Right-arm Medium
- Role: All-rounder
- Relatives: Ahmed Rasheed (brother); Farooq Rasheed (brother); Haroon Rasheed (brother); Mohtashim Rasheed (brother); Mahmood Rasheed (brother); Tahir Rasheed (brother)

Domestic team information
- Years: Team
- 1981/82-1988/89: Karachi
- 1983/84-1994/95: Karachi Whites
- 1983/84-1986/87: Pakistan Automobiles Corporation
- 1990/91-1991/92: Bahawalpur
- 1994/95-1996/97: United Bank Limited
- 1995/96: Karachi Blues
- 1997/98: Islamabad
- 1998/99-1999/00: Pakistan National Shipping Corporation
- 1998/99: Hyderabad

Career statistics
Competition	FC	LA
Matches	146	102
Runs scored	5644	1771
Batting average	25.42	23.00
100s/50s	2/40	2/5
Top score	147*	115
Balls bowled	10,024	3,581
Wickets	172	87
Bowling average	24.33	26.64
5 wickets in innings	6	0
10 wickets in match	2	0
Best bowling	7/48	4/25
Catches/stumpings	111/61	30/–
- Source: ESPNcricinfo; Pakistan Cricket, 10 July 2022

Umar Rasheed (Urdu: عمر رشید) (born 25 December 1962) is a Pakistani former first-class cricketer who played 146 First-class and 102 List-A games.
