= Javed Hayat =

Pakistani cricketer (born 1964)

Personal information
- Full name: Javed Hayat
- Born: 25 November 1964 (age 61); Lahore, Pakistan
- Batting: Left-handed
- Bowling: Slow left-arm Orthodox
- Source: ESPNcricinfo, 18 October 2016

Javed Hayat (born 25 November 1964) is a Pakistani former cricketer. He played 153 first-class and 108 List A matches for several domestic teams in Pakistan between 1984 and 2005.

== See also ==
- List of Pakistan Automobiles Corporation cricketers
