= Babar Zaman =

Pakistani cricketer (born 1966)

Personal information
- Full name: Babar Zaman Khan
- Born: 16 September 1966 (age 60); Rawalpindi, Pakistan
- Batting: Right-handed
- Bowling: Right-arm medium
- Relatives: Humayun Zaman (uncle); Imran Khan (cousin); Majid Khan (cousin)

Career statistics
Competition	FC	List A
Matches	84	69
Runs scored	3,422	1,337
Batting average	24.44	21.56
100s/50s	3/21	1/6
Top score	135	110*
Balls bowled	3,994	845
Wickets	66	18
Bowling average	29.81	36.55
5 wickets in innings	3	0
10 wickets in match	0	0
Best bowling	6/119	2/5
Catches/stumpings	38/–	23/–
- Source: CricInfo, 19 December 2023

Babar Zaman (Note: Urdu: بابر زمان) (born 16 September 1966) is a former Pakistani cricketer with a career spanning over 16 years, having played for several cricket teams, most notably Lahore and Pakistan International Airlines from 1985-1986 to 1999-2000.

== Early life ==
Babar Zaman Khan was born in Rawalpindi on 16 September 1966 into a Burki Pashtun family to Javed Zaman and Faryal. His father, Javed Zaman, was a first-class cricketer. Babar's uncles, Fawad Zaman and Humayun Zaman, also played first class cricket. All three brothers represented Lahore Gymkhana Club with distinction.

== Career ==
Zaman made his List A debut for Lahore City against Pakistan Automobiles Corporation in the 1985–86 Wills Cup. He later played senior domestic cricket mainly for Lahore, Pakistan University Grants Commission and Pakistan International Airlines. His first-class career ran from 1986/87 to 1999/00, while his List A career spanned from 1985/86 to 1999/00.

One of Zaman's earliest notable first-class innings came in the 1988–89 BCCP Patron's Trophy, when he scored 79 for Lahore City against Rawalpindi, which at that stage was his highest first-class score. In one-day cricket, his highest score was an unbeaten 110 for Lahore City against Water and Power Development Authority in the 1987–88 Wills Cup, an innings which remained his only List A century. Late in his career, he produced one of his best all-round performances against the touring Zimbabweans at Gaddafi Stadium in December 1998, scoring 46 in the first innings and taking 4 for 47 in the second innings as Lahore City won by one wicket.
