= Murtaza Hussain =

Pakistani first-class cricketer (born 1974)

Personal information
- Born: 20 December 1974 (age 51); Bahawalpur, Punjab, Pakistan
- Batting: Right-handed
- Bowling: Right-arm off break

Domestic team information
- Years: Team
- 1990/91–2001/02: Bahawalpur
- 1992/93–1993/94: Pakistan Automobiles
- 1994/95: United Bank Limited
- 1995/96–1996/97: Pakistan National Shipping Corporation
- 1997/98–1999/00: Khan Research Laboratories
- 1998/99: Islamabad
- 2004/05–2008/09: Pakistan Customs
- 2005/06: Multan Tigers
- 2007–2009: Surrey

Career statistics
Competition	First-class	List A
Matches	148	107
Runs scored	3,571	774
Batting average	20.88	14.60
100s/50s	1/12	0/1
Top score	117	85
Balls bowled	34,051	4,875
Wickets	573	132
Bowling average	24.96	25.99
5 wickets in innings	36	1
10 wickets in match	7	0
Best bowling	9/54	5/18
Catches/stumpings	70/–	34/–
- Source: CricketArchive, 8 May 2025

Murtaza Hussain (born 20 December 1974) is a Pakistani first-class cricketer.

A right-arm offbreak bowler, Hussain took over 500 wickets in a first-class career which he began as a 15 year old in 1990/91. He played for Surrey in 2007 and 2008 and has also played for Pakistan A. Hussain has played club cricket for Mildenhall Cricket Club in the East Anglian Premier Cricket League. His career best innings figures were 9 for 54, while his only first-class century was scored against Attock Group in 2006.
