= Javed Zaman (Pakistani cricketer) =

Pakistani cricketer (1938–2023)

- جاوید زمان
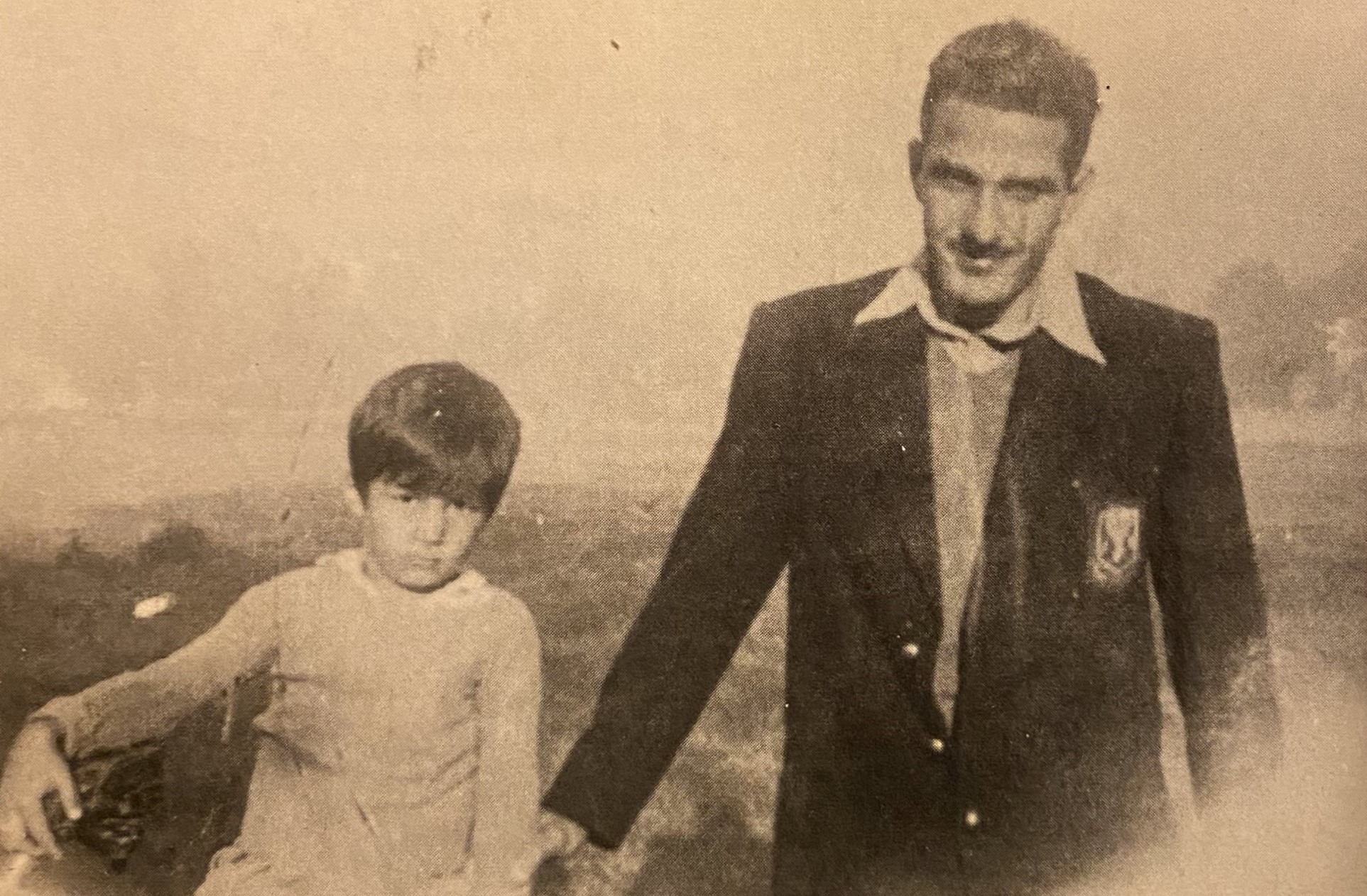
- Javed with his nephew, Imran Khan, (1957)

Secretary Lahore Gymkhana Cricket Club
- In office 2007 – 24 December 2023

Head of Pakistan Veterans Cricket Association (Northern Zone)
- In office 1998–2000

Captain of Lahore Gymkhana Cricket Club
- In office 1975–1995

Personal details
- Born: Javed Zaman Khan; 7 January 1938 Jullundur, British Raj
- Died: 24 December 2023 (aged 85) Zaman Park, Pakistan
- Spouse: Faryal (m. 1962)
- Children: 5, including Babar
- Relatives: Humayun Zaman (brother); Jahangir Khan (cousin); Ahmed Raza (cousin); Majid Khan (nephew); Asad Jahangir Khan (nephew); Imran Khan (nephew); Jamshed Burki (nephew); Javed Burki (nephew)
- Education: Aitchison College; Government College Lahore
- Nickname: JZ
- Cricket career

Cricket information
- Batting: Right-hand
- Bowling: Right-arm Offbreak

Domestic team information
- Years: Team
- 1961/62 1969/70: Lahore A
- 1962/63: Lahore District Cricket Association Reds
- 1967/68: Lahore Greens

Career statistics
Competition	FC
Matches	9
Runs scored	262
Batting average	23.81
100s/50s	0/1
Top score	68
Balls bowled	864
Wickets	17
Bowling average	20.64
5 wickets in innings	0
10 wickets in match	0
Best bowling	4/17
Catches/stumpings	1/–
- Source: ESPNcricinfo

Javed Zaman Khan (Note: Urdu: جاوید زمان خان) (7 January 1938 – 24 December 2023), known as JZ, was a Pakistani sports administrator and former first-class cricketer who played from 1961 to 1962 and 1969–1970. He was also known for being the mentor of his nephew, cricketer and former Prime Minister Imran Khan. He served as the longest captain of Lahore Gymkhana Cricket Club from 1975 to 1995 later becoming its secretary in 2011. Additionally, he served as the Head of Pakistan Veterans Cricket Association (Northern Zone) from 1998 to 2000.

Known for his cricket prowess, Zaman captained the Aitchison College cricket team during his student years and contributed significantly to Zaman Parks cricket. He played alongside his brother, Humayun, at Government College Lahore and served as the longest captain of Lahore Gymkhana Cricket Club from 1975 to 1995 later being its secretary in 2011.

== Early life ==
Javed Zaman Khan was born on 7 January 1938 in Jullundur and hailed from a renowned Burki Pashtun sports family. He was the second son of Khan Bahadur Mohammad Zaman Khan, who was the Postmaster General of Punjab and the North-West Frontier Province. Javed's father built a seven-bedroom house in Lahore in 1940 and became the second Muslim family in the Canal Bank area which is now known as Zaman Park.

Their family produced notable figures such as All-India Test cricketers Jahangir Khan and Baqa Jilani, with a strong presence in various Olympic disciplines, especially hockey.

== Personal life and death ==
Javed was a cousin of Iqbal Bano, Naima Mubarak Begum, and Shaukat Khanum, who were the mothers of cricketers Javed Burki, Majid Khan, and Imran Khan—all three would eventually become captains of the Pakistan national cricket team.

Javed had two brothers who were also first-class cricketers, Humayun and Ahmed Fuad Zaman, a Brigadier in the Pakistan Army.

In March 1962, Javed married Faryal and they have five children, one daughter and four sons, including Qasim, Tariq, and Babar Zaman.

Javed died on 24 December 2023 at his residence in Zaman Park.

== Later life ==
Javed Zaman worked in different capacities on the Pakistan Cricket Board (PCB) on an honorary basis. As the PCB's adviser on grassroots level, he resigned in 2008 citing domestic problems as the reason, although there were speculations about PCB authorities requesting his resignation due to him being close with former Director Special Projects Salim Altaf, who was dismissed with two others for leaking news to the press. Zaman tendered his resignation while emphasising the ethical and legal concerns regarding the alleged cellphone surveillance of Altaf.

=== Man of the Match awards ===
#	Opponent	Venue	Date	Match Performance	Result
1	Islamabad Panthers	Race Course Park, Lahore	1 December 2010	27; took 3 wickets while conceding 14 runs	Lahore Blues won by 9 wickets.
