= Amin Lakhani =

Pakistani cricketer (born 1959)

Personal information
- Born: 1 October 1959 (age 67); Karachi, Pakistan
- Batting: Right-handed
- Bowling: Slow left-arm orthodox

Career statistics
Competition	FC	List A
Matches	136	72
Runs scored	1409	188
Batting average	10.36	7.83
100s/50s	0/1	0/0
Top score	54*	35
Balls bowled	28796	3555
Wickets	466	86
Bowling average	26.53	26.02
5 wickets in innings	21	–
10 wickets in match	4	n/a
Best bowling	8/60	4/10
Catches/stumpings	114/–	18/–
- Source: CricketArchive, 10 January 2017

Amin Lakhani (born 1 October 1959) is a former cricketer who played first-class and List A cricket in Pakistan from 1976 to 1993.

A left-arm spin bowler, Lakhani took a hat-trick in each innings of a match in Multan in October 1978: aged 19, playing for a Universities and Young Pakistan team against the touring Indian Test team, he took 6 for 58 with a hat-trick in the first innings and 6 for 80 with a hat-trick in the second. All six of his hat-trick victims were Test players. Despite his success, the Indian team won by two wickets.

He captained the Pakistan National Shipping Corporation cricket team from 1986–87 until 1992–93, his final season of first-class cricket, when he also took his best bowling figures of 8 for 60 against Pakistan Automobiles Corporation.
