= Sultanabad, Karachi =

Settlement in Karachi

Sultanabad سلطان آباد
- Unplanned settlement
- Interactive map of Sultanabad سلطان آباد
- District: Karachi West
- City: Karachi
- Country: Pakistan
- Time zone: UTC+5 (PST)
- Postal code: 75300

Sultanabad (Urdu: سلطان آباد) is a multiethnic informal settlement, located in central Karachi, Pakistan.

The majority of its residents are from the Pashtun community, with many migrating to the area during the military operations in the tribal areas in the 2010s. Other ethnic groups, including Hindkowans, Sindhis, and Saraiki people, also reside here. Sultanabad is situated near Karachi's industrial, economic, and business hubs, and in proximity to the Pakistan Industrial Development Corporation (PIDC) and prominent hotels like the Pearl Continental Hotel and Mövenpick. Additionally, the renowned Habib Public School is located nearby.

Sultanabad is also home to the New Haji Camp, the centralised location for gathering Hajj pilgrims, previously dispersed across Karachi areas like Lyari, Old Haji Camp, and near Karachi Cantonment railway station. In 1959, General Muhammad Ayub Khan, then military dictator ruling the country as President of Pakistan, laid its foundation stone near M.T. Khan Road. The camp, covering 14,164 m^{2} (150,000 sq ft) of built-up space and over 44,515 m^{2} (480,000 sq ft) of open area, was completed in 1966. Today, the Ministry of Religious Affairs and Inter-faith Harmony oversees the welfare and facilitation of pilgrims preparing for their journey.

Sultanabad, located adjacent to the U.S. Consulate in Karachi, frequently faces security concerns, which have resulted in the demolition of residential houses in the area.
