= Habib Public School =

Private school in Karachi

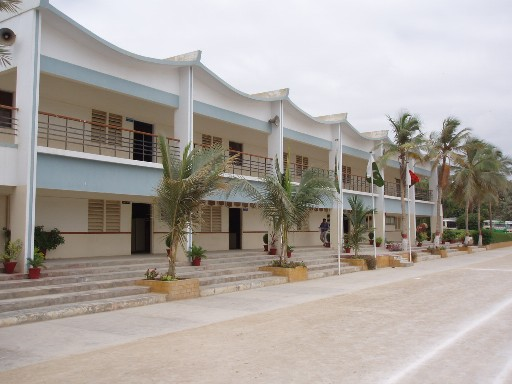

Location
- Pakistan
- 24.8425°N 67.0208°E

Information
- Funding type: Private school
- Established: 1959
- Status: Open
- Principal: Mr. Minhas Tejani (from December 2021)
- Grades: 1–13
- Age range: 4-17
- Language: English-medium
- Colors: Blue , Red , Green and Yellow
- Nickname: HPS
- Qualifications: General Certificate of Education
- Boards: University of Cambridge International Examinations, Aga Khan University
- Website: https://www.habibschools.edu.pk/hps

Habib Public School is an educational institution located on M.T. Khan Road in the Sultanabad area of Karachi, Pakistan.

== Admission ==
Every year, admission tests take place for grade 1 and other grades as per the seats available. Thousands of students take the competitive admission test, in which ~180 boys are selected as successful candidates for admission.

== History ==
The School started on 7 July 1959 (11th Zilqad) with four blocks of buildings, named Ahmed House, Ghulam Ali House, Dawood House and Sharif House. The first administrator of the School was the late Mr. Yousuf Qasim. School started with only 41 students and now approximately has 2000 students.

Habib Public School is the realisation of a dream. When the four sons of Habib Ismail (banker, philanthropist and visionary) migrated to Pakistan they realized the need for good quality schools established and managed by the Muslim community. Their goal was to provide quality education to all without discrimination. High-standard teaching and learning facilities at subsidised rates have been the guiding light for HPS since its very creation.

Habib Public School’s humble beginnings were in just 4 blocks of buildings: Ahmed House, Ghulam Ali House, Dawood House, and Sharif House. These were run by the school’s first administrator, the late Mr. Yousuf Qasim, who oversaw admissions, staff appointments, and construction work as the school steadily expanded and grew.

In the school’s early years, there was a real emphasis on developing Habib Public School’s academic credentials as well as its sports facilities. HPS’s pioneering staff members have always believed that academic achievement and physical education were closely linked together. Values like teamwork, resilience, patience, and respect were instilled into children’s psyche on the playing field and would contribute to developing them into excellent citizens of tomorrow.

In 4 short years, HPS grew into one of the most high-profile academic institutions of Karachi. Soon, the city’s elite were flocking to HPS for their children’s educational needs.

Habib Public School started out with just 3 admissions on its first day in 1959, but in a single year the school was filled to capacity with students, despite the marshy and somewhat isolated geography of the area. There were no easily accessible public transport facilities in the region at the time, and many children had to walk from as far as Saddar or Cantt Station to get to school.

There was a surge in land reclamation projects to expand the school and its facilities. Over these 15 years, HPS developed a second hockey field, a swimming pool, an auditorium, high quality physics and chemistry labs, and expanded the number of classrooms available to students.

In 1979, HPS introduced the Cambridge qualification system to ensure its students had the best possible education available to them.

The founding ethos of quality education for all has remained at the heart of the school throughout its growth. Our student population has continued to be reflective of the diversity in our wider society. The school has strived to create a level playing field for all its students, regardless of background, to ensure endless possibilities for each one.

== Notable alumni ==
- Sohail Abbas, hockey player
- Shahid Khaqan Abbasi, former Prime Minister of Pakistan
- Mansoor Ahmad, hockey goalkeeper
- Ahmad Alam, hockey goalkeeper
- Kamran Ashraf, hockey player
- Syed Abbas Haider Bilgrami, olympian (hockey)
- Hussain Haqqani, journalist
- Qamar Ibrahim, olympian (hockey)
- Shoaib Mohammad, former international cricketer
- Raza Rabbani, former chairman Senate of Pakistan
- Hassan Sardar, olympian (hockey)
- Dara Bashir, former first-class cricketer
- Tabish Hashmi, TV personality, Host, Comedian
