= Ghulam Pasha =

Pakistani cricketer (born 1969)

Personal information
- Born: 25 November 1969 (age 56); Lahore, Pakistan
- Source: ESPNcricinfo, 19 October 2016

Ghulam Pasha (born 25 November 1969) is a Pakistani former cricketer. He played eight first-class and three List A matches for several domestic teams in Pakistan between 1986 and 1990.

== See also ==
- List of Pakistan Automobiles Corporation cricketers
