= Shahid Anwar =

Pakistani International cricketer (born 1968)

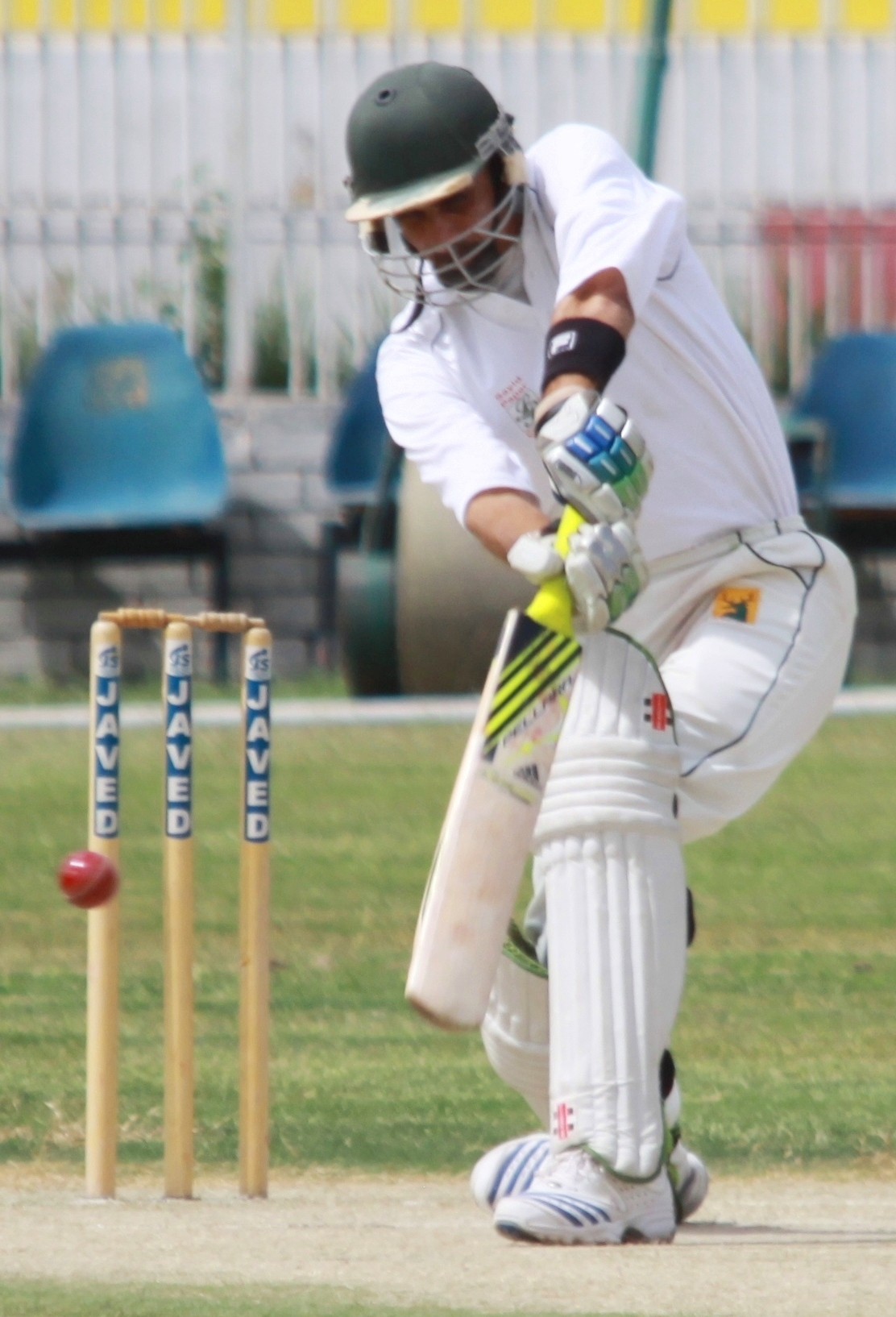

Cricket information
- Batting: Right-handed
- Bowling: Right-arm medium-fast

Career statistics
Competition	ODIs	First-class
Matches	1	216
Runs scored	37	12,100
Batting average	37	34.87
100s/50s	0/0	26/63
Top score	37	195
Balls bowled	0	3,234
Wickets	–	61
Bowling average	–	25.06
5 wickets in innings	–	1
10 wickets in match	–	0
Best bowling	–	6/2
Catches/stumpings	0/0	86/0
- Source: CricInfo, 5 May 2006

Shahid Anwar (born 5 July 1968) is a Pakistani former International cricketer and current coach.

== Playing career ==
=== International ===
Anwar made his one-day debut against England, scoring 37 runs in his only match for the national team.

=== Domestic ===
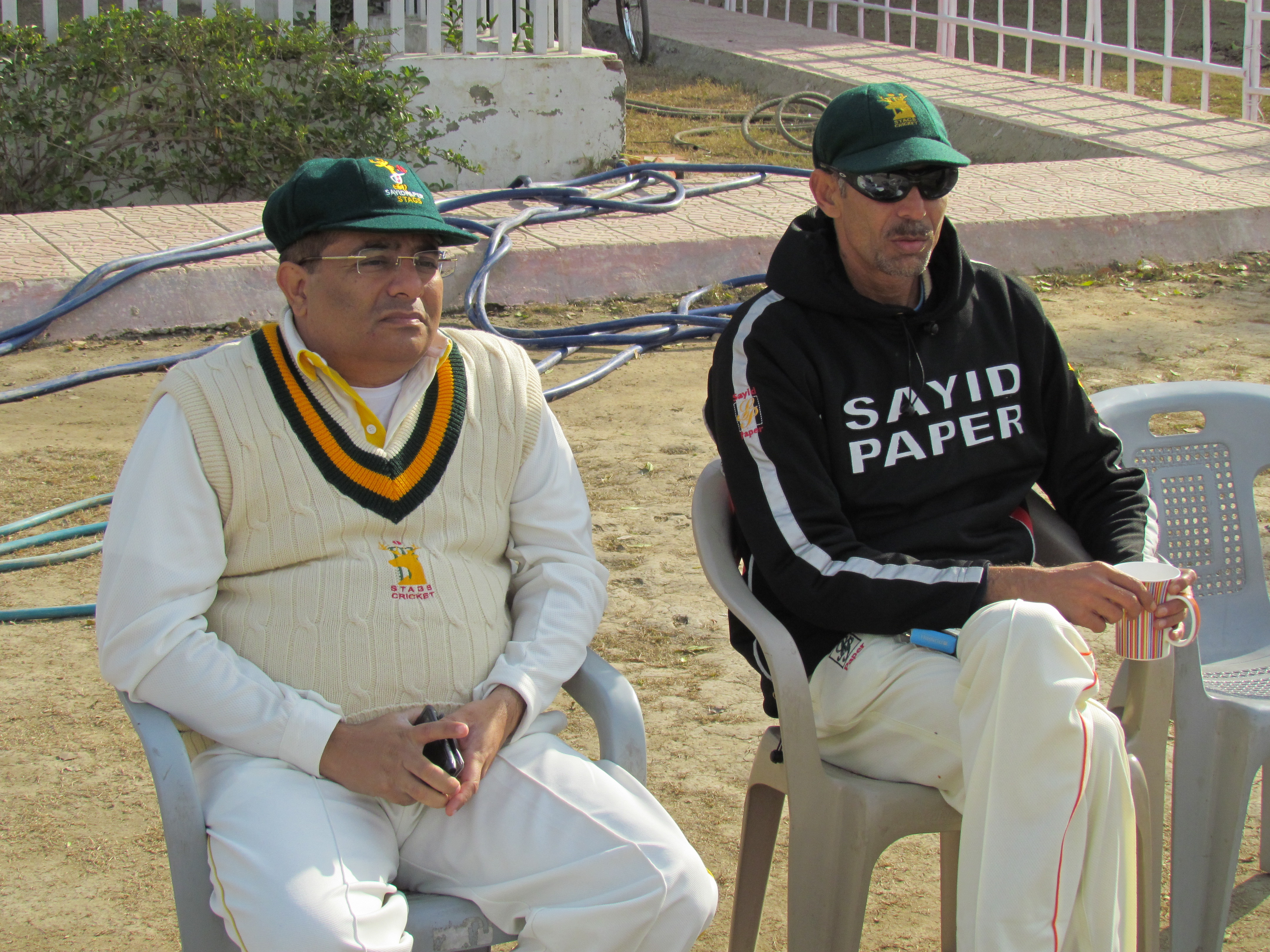
Shahid Anwar (right)

In domestic cricket, he represented Lahore, Bahawalpur, National Bank of Pakistan, Pakistan Automobiles Corporation, and Pakistan National Shipping Corporation during his career and also played on the UK Cricket League Circuit. He captained the National Bank Grade 1 and Lahore Grade 1 teams to national championships and appeared in 216 first-class games as a batting all-rounder, scoring 12,100 runs (at 34.87) with a highest score of 195, as well as appearing in 152 List A matches. His first-class career includes 26 centuries and 63 half centuries. Anwar took 61 wickets in first-class cricket with a career best of 6/2.

== Coaching ==
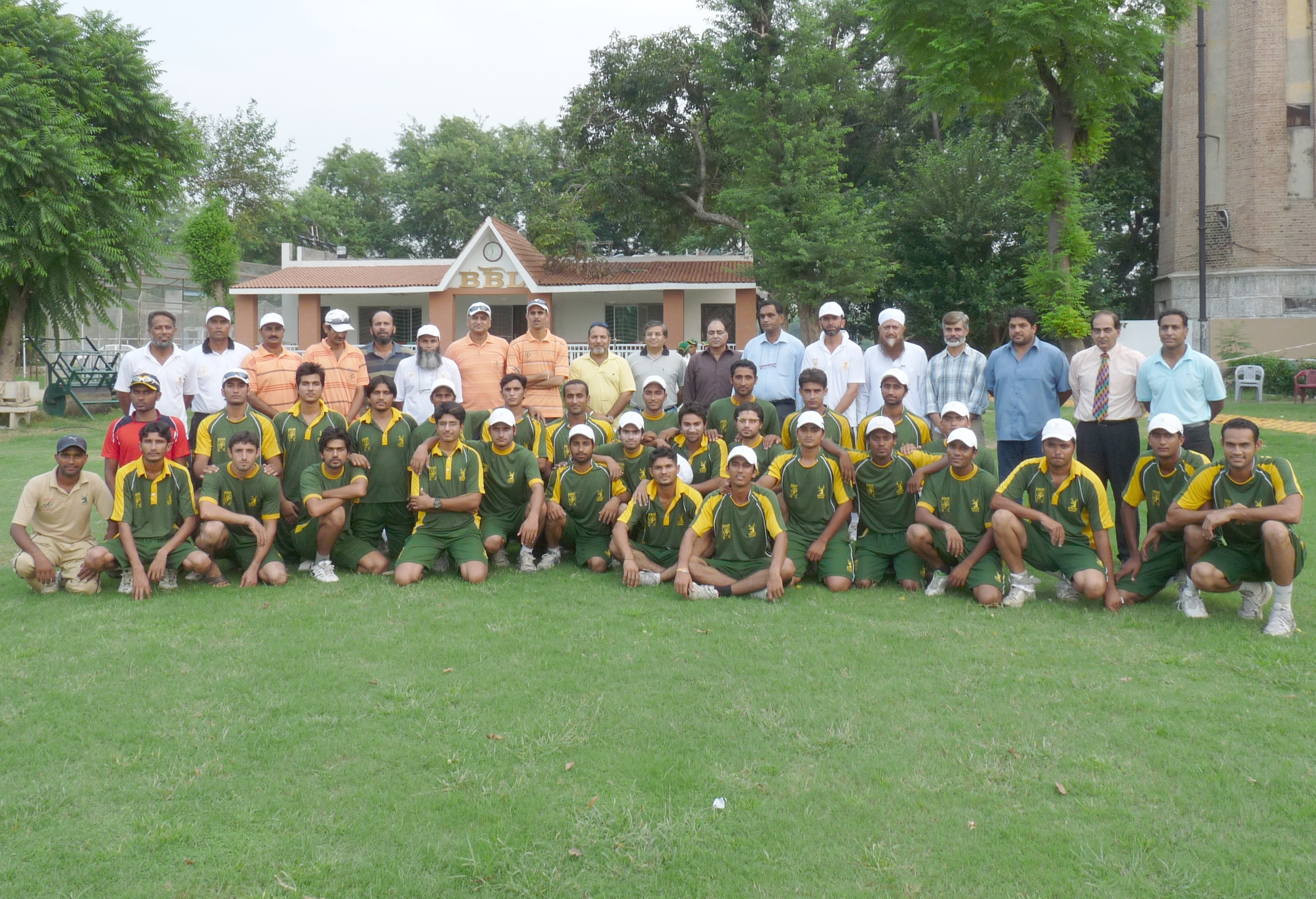
Stags Cricket Academy Group Photograph

After retiring from first-class cricket, Shahid proceeded to become one of the most successful cricket coaches in Pakistan. After completing Level I, II and III cricket coaching diplomas from CA (Cricket Australia), he joined Sialkot Stallions as their head coach and propelled them to National T-20 Championship, and the National Bank side to the 2011 One day championship runner-up position. He also coached Pakistan "A" team during its tour of Australia in 2010.

He has also coached the Pakistan under-19 team that beat India, by 191 runs, in the final of the 2025 ACC Under-19 Asia Cup.
