= Mian Fayyaz =

Pakistani cricketer (born 1959)

Personal information
- Born: 29 April 1959 (age 67); Lahore, Pakistan
- Source: ESPNcricinfo, 19 October 2016

Mian Fayyaz (born 29 April 1959) is a Pakistani former cricketer. He played 64 first-class and 18 List A matches for several domestic teams in Pakistan between 1980 and 1993.

== See also ==
- List of Pakistan Automobiles Corporation cricketers
