= Haroon Rasheed =

Pakistani cricketer (born 1953)

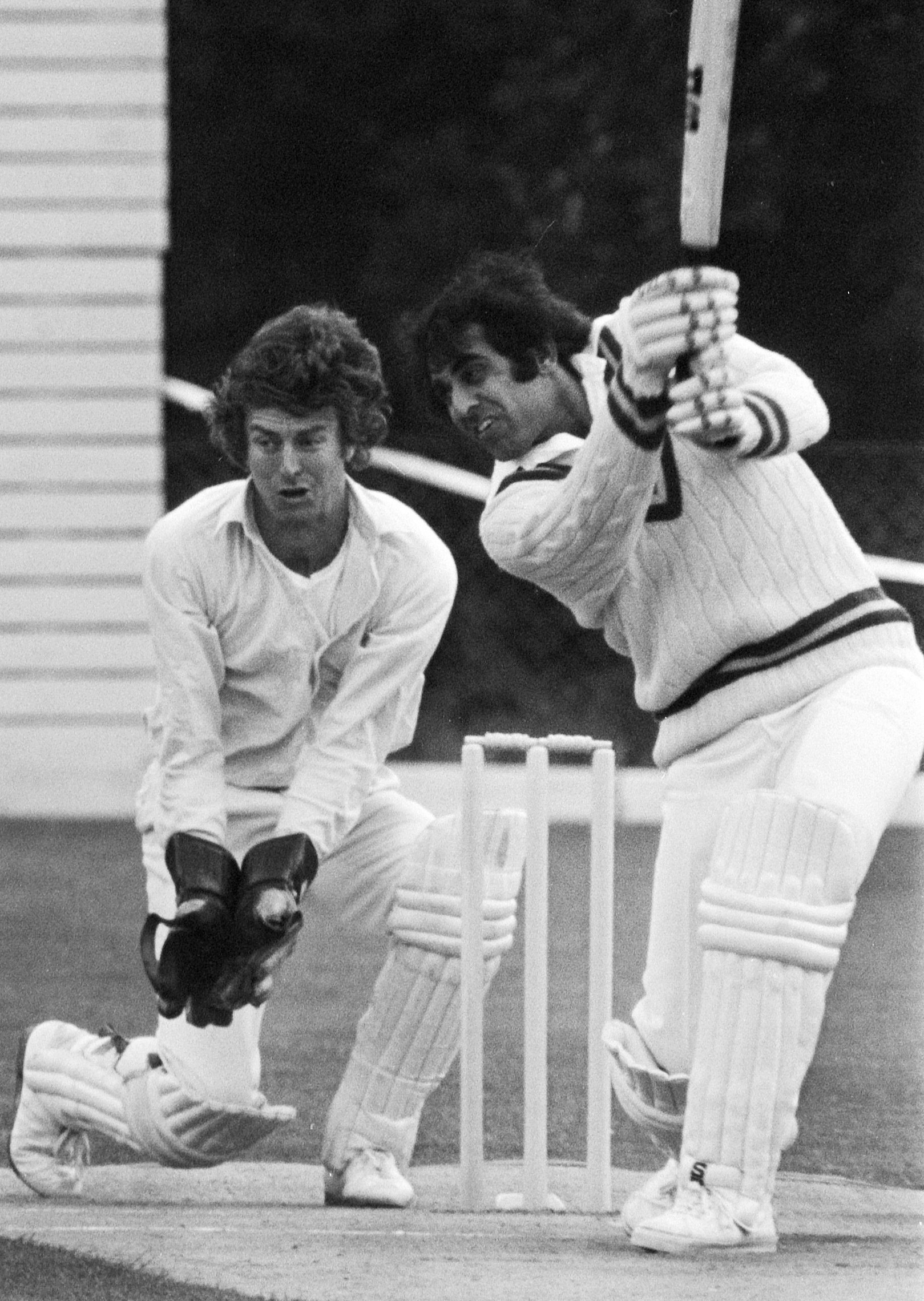
- Haroon Rashid (right) in 1978

Personal information
- Born: 25 March 1953 (age 73); Karachi, Pakistan
- Batting: Right-handed
- Bowling: Right-arm medium
- Relatives: Ahmed Rasheed (brother); Farooq Rasheed (brother); Mahmood Rasheed (brother); Tahir Rasheed (brother); Umar Rasheed (brother); Mohtashim Rasheed (brother)

International information
- National side: Pakistan
- Test debut (cap 77): 14 January 1977 v Australia
- Last Test: 14 January 1983 v India
- ODI debut (cap 23): 30 December 1977 v England
- Last ODI: 08 October 1982 v Australia

Career statistics
Competition	Test	ODI
Matches	23	12
Runs scored	1217	166
Batting average	34.77	20.75
100s/50s	3/5	0/1
Top score	153	63*
Balls bowled	8	–
Wickets	0	–
Bowling average	–	–
5 wickets in innings	–	–
10 wickets in match	–	–
Best bowling	–	–
Catches/stumpings	16/–	3/–
- Source: CricInfo, 4 February 2006

Haroon Rasheed Dar (born 25 March 1953) is a Pakistani cricket coach and former cricketer who played in 23 Test matches and 12 One Day International from 1977 to 1983.

== Early life and education ==
Haroon Rasheed Dar was born on 25 March 1953 in Karachi to Kashmiri parents. As a child he attended the Church Mission School (CMS) in Karachi.

== Career ==
Product of the Muslim Gymkhana in Karachi, he was picked up for the squad but in 1978 he was exposed of the moving ball. But Rasheed showed grit in the Jamaica Test of 1976–77 where most of the top order feared the mighty West Indian attack.

== Coaching role ==
In 1984, Haroon quit first-class cricket and joined United Bank. In 1988 he coached United Bank U19s, went on to be national U19s selector and coach and selected Shahid Afridi who lived near him. Later he was asked to send replacements for the injury hit Pakistan side in Kenya where Afridi was sent & he made historical 102(37).

== Incidents ==
Harood Rasheed escaped a hit and run attack for not selecting a player advised on a phone in 1995.

Harood was pulled out of the car near a Karachi Shopping Centre by youngsters for his slow batting in the 1979 Semi Final.
