= Tanvir Ahmed (cricketer, born 1963) =

Pakistani cricketer (born 1963)

Personal information
- Born: 11 February 1963 (age 63); Lahore, Pakistan
- Source: Cricinfo, 14 February 2017

Tanvir Ahmed (born 11 February 1963) is a Pakistani former cricketer. He played 50 first-class and 24 List A matches for several domestic teams in Pakistan between 1977 and 1993.

== See also ==
- List of Pakistan Automobiles Corporation cricketers
