= Rashid Mahmood =

Pakistani cricketer (born 1971)

Personal information
- Born: 23 September 1971 (age 55); Karachi, Pakistan
- Source: Cricinfo, 19 October 2016

Rashid Mahmood (born 23 September 1971) is a Pakistani former cricketer. He played five first-class and eleven List A matches for several domestic teams in Pakistan between 1989 and 1992.

== See also ==
- List of Pakistan Automobiles Corporation cricketers
