= Moin Mumtaz =

Pakistani cricketer (born 1964)

Cricket information
- Batting: Right-handed
- Source: CricInfo

Moin Mumtaz (born 24 June 1964) is a Pakistani cricketer who played from 1981 to 2001.

== British career ==
Moin moved to the UK in 1987 and played for 14 years with the Highway Club in Coventry. He successfully led the team to numerous victories including winning the pick of the league many years in a row.
