= Nadeem Ahsan =

Pakistani cricketer (born 1963)

Personal information
- Born: 10 July 1963 (age 63); Sialkot, Pakistan
- Batting: Right-handed
- Role: Wicket-keeper
- Source: ESPNcricinfo, 19 October 2016

Nadeem Ahsan (born 10 July 1963) is a Pakistani former cricketer. He played 25 first-class and 3 List A matches for several domestic teams in Pakistan between 1983 and 1987.

== See also ==
- List of Pakistan Automobiles Corporation cricketers
