= Ahmed Rasheed (cricketer) =

Pakistani cricketer (born 1991)

Ahmed Rasheed احمد رشید
Personal information
- Full name: Ahmed Rasheed
- Born: 8 June 1991 (age 35); Mian Channu, Punjab, Pakistan
- Batting: Right-handed
- Bowling: Right-arm leg spinner
- Role: Batsman
- Relatives: Farooq Rasheed (brother); Haroon Rasheed (brother); Mahmood Rasheed (brother); Mohtashim Rasheed (brother); Tahir Rasheed (brother); Umar Rasheed (brother)

Domestic team information
- Years: Team
- 2009/10: Pakistan Customs
- 2012/13-2013/14: Multan
- 2013/14-2015: Multan Tigers

Career statistics
Competition	FC	LA	T20
Matches	19	7	2
Runs scored	828	120	28
Batting average	25.09	20.00	14.00
100s/50s	1/4	0/0	0/0
Top score	120	35	15
Balls bowled	72	0	0
Wickets	0	–	–
Bowling average	–	–	–
5 wickets in innings	0	–	–
10 wickets in match	0	–	–
Best bowling	–	–	–
Catches/stumpings	6/–	0/–	0/–
- Source: ESPNcricinfo; Pakistan Cricket, 10 July 2022

Ahmed Rasheed (Urdu: احمد رشید) (born 8 June 1991) is a Pakistani cricket player. As of January 2016 he has played nineteen first-class and seven List A matches.
