= Siddiq Patni =

Pakistani cricketer (born 1964)

Personal information
- Born: 18 June 1964 (age 62); Karachi, Pakistan
- Source: Cricinfo, 24 October 2016

Siddiq Patni (born 18 June 1964) is a Pakistani former cricketer. He played 41 first-class and 16 List A matches for several domestic teams in Pakistan between 1979 and 1992.

== See also ==
- List of Pakistan Automobiles Corporation cricketers
