= Tahir Mahmood (cricketer) =

Pakistani cricketer (born 1962)

Personal information
- Born: 15 September 1962 (age 62); Sialkot, Pakistan
- Source: ESPNcricinfo, 14 February 2017

Tahir Mahmood (born 15 September 1962) is a Pakistani former cricketer. He played 48 first-class and 24 List A matches for several domestic teams, particularly Gujranwala Cricket Association and Pakistan Automobiles Corporation teams between 1981 and 2003.

== See also ==
- List of Pakistan Automobiles Corporation cricketers
