= Agha Saadat Ali =

Pakistani cricketer (1929–1995)

Personal information
- Born: 21 January 1929; Lahore, British India
- Died: 25 October 1995 (aged 66); Lahore, Pakistan
- Batting: Right-handed

International information
- National side: Pakistan
- Only Test (cap 22): 7 November 1955 v New Zealand

Career statistics
Competition	Test	First-class
Matches	1	17
Runs scored	8	325
Batting average	–	13.54
100s/50s	0/0	0/2
Top score	8*	56
Balls bowled	–	152
Wickets	–	1
Bowling average	–	62.00
5 wickets in innings	–	0
10 wickets in match	–	0
Best bowling	–	1/46
Catches/stumpings	3/–	8/–
- Source: ESPNCricinfo, 13 June 2017

Agha Saadat Ali (Urdu: آغا سعادت علی; 21 June 1929 – 25 October 1995) was a Pakistani cricketer who played in one Test match in 1955. After retiring as a cricketer, he started umpiring, mainly in domestic fixtures. He also officiated in a single One Day International in 1978.

Agha Saadat Ali appeared in non-first-class matches against the touring West Indians in 1948 and a Commonwealth team in 1949. Between 1949 and 1950, when he made his first-class debut for Pakistan Universities against Ceylon, and 1961–62, when he captained Lahore B, he played 17 first-class matches altogether. He had limited success as a batsman, but was regarded as one of the best fielders in Pakistan.

After retirement, he became a coach at the national level, and served as assistant secretary of the BCCP. He was also president of the Billiard and Snooker Association of Lahore. Both of his sons played first-class cricket. He died from carcinomatosis aged 66.

== See also ==
- List of One Day International cricket umpires
