= Ali Raza =

Ali Raza may refer to:

- Ali Raza (cricketer, born 1974), Pakistani cricketer
- Ali Raza (cricketer, born 1977), Pakistani cricketer
- Ali Raza (cricketer, born 1981), Pakistani cricketer
- Ali Raza (cricketer, born 1987), Pakistani cricketer
- Ali Raza (cricketer, born 2008), Pakistani cricketer
- Ali Raza (field hockey) (born 1976), Pakistani Olympic hockey player
- Ali al-Rida, seventh descendant of the Islamic prophet Muhammad and the eighth of the Twelve Imams
- S. Ali Raza, Indian film screenwriter and director
- Ali Raza (actor), Pakistani actor
