= Sher Ali (cricketer) =

Pakistani cricketer (born 1970)

Personal information
- Born: 9 April 1970 (age 56); Lahore, Pakistan
- Batting: Right-handed
- Bowling: Right arm Medium
- Source: ESPNcricinfo, 24 October 2016

Sher Ali (born 9 April 1970) is a Pakistani former cricketer. He played 103 first-class and 69 List A matches for several domestic teams in Pakistan between 1986 and 1999.

== See also ==
- List of Pakistan Automobiles Corporation cricketers
