= Ghaffar Khan (cricketer) =

Pakistani cricketer (born 1940)

Personal information
- Born: 1 April 1940 (age 86); Shimla, Punjab, British India
- Source: ESPNcricinfo, 18 October 2016

Ghaffar Khan (born 1 April 1940) is a Pakistani former cricketer. He played 29 first-class cricket matches for several domestic sides in Pakistan between 1954 and 1984 and List-A cricket in the 1980/81 domestic cricket season.

== See also ==
- List of Pakistan Automobiles Corporation cricketers
