= Hasan Jamil =

Pakistani cricketer (1952–2015)

Personal information
- Full name: Hasan Jamil Alvi
- Born: 25 July 1952; Karachi, Sind, Pakistan
- Died: 7 October 2015 (aged 63); Karachi, Sindh, Pakistan
- Batting: Left-handed
- Bowling: Left-arm medium-fast
- Role: All-rounder

International information
- National side: Pakistan (1977–1978)
- ODI debut (cap 19): 23 December 1977 v England
- Last ODI: 3 November 1978 v India

Domestic team information
- Years: Team
- 1969/70: Kalat
- 1970/71–1971/72: Karachi Blues
- 1972/73–1974/75: Pakistan Universities
- 1974/75: Karachi Whites
- 1975/76–1984/85: Pakistan International Airlines
- 1977/78: Habib Bank Limited
- 1978/79: Sind

Career statistics
Competition	ODI	First-class	List A
Matches	6	120	43
Runs scored	111	4230	713
Batting average	22.20	29.58	24.58
100s/50s	0/0	4/21	0/3
Top score	28	172	65
Balls bowled	232	12004	1862
Wickets	8	204	40
Bowling average	19.25	30.77	28.97
5 wickets in innings	0	7	0
10 wickets in match	0	0	0
Best bowling	3/18	5/38	4/50
Catches/stumpings	1/–	60/–	5/–
- Source: ESPNCricinfo, 5 July 2026

Hasan Jamil Alvi (25 July 1952 – 7 October 2015) was a Pakistani cricketer. Jamil was a left-handed batsman who bowled left-arm medium-fast. He was born in Karachi, Sindh.

Jamil made his first-class debut for Kalat in the 1969/70 Pakistani season. He made his List A debut for Pakistan Universities in the 1974/75 season, and made his ODI debut for Pakistan against England at Sahiwal on 23 December 1977. He played his last ODI against India, also at Sahiwal, on 3 November 1978.

During his domestic career, Jamil represented Kalat, Karachi Blues, Pakistan Universities, Karachi Whites, Pakistan International Airlines, Habib Bank Limited and Sind. He also played for Pakistan Under-19s, Pakistan Under-25s, Pakistan A-type representative sides and the BCCP President's XI.

In international cricket, Jamil's best ODI bowling came in the second ODI against India at Sialkot on 12 October 1978, when he took 3 wickets for 18 runs and was named player of the match in Pakistan's eight-wicket victory. He finished the three-match ODI series against India in 1978 as Pakistan's leading wicket-taker, with six wickets at an average of 15.83.

Jamil played six ODIs for Pakistan between 1977 and 1978, scoring 111 runs and taking eight wickets. He was also part of Pakistan's squad for the 1979 Cricket World Cup, although he did not play a match. In all first-class cricket, he scored 4,230 runs with four centuries and took 204 wickets.

After retiring from cricket, Jamil served as a member of the national selection committee and later worked as general manager cricket at the Arabian Sea Country Club in Karachi. He died in Karachi on 7 October 2015 after suffering cardiac arrest.
