= Shahid Hussain =

Pakistani cricketer (born 1970)

Personal information
- Born: 29 December 1970 (age 55); Peshawar, Pakistan
- Source: ESPNcricinfo, 24 October 2016

Shahid Hussain (born 29 December 1970) is a Pakistani former cricketer. He played 78 first-class and 37 List A matches for several domestic teams in Pakistan between 1986 and 1998.

== See also ==
- List of Pakistan Automobiles Corporation cricketers
