= Sohail Jaffar =

Pakistani cricketer (born 1967)

Personal information
- Full name: Sohail Jaffar Ali
- Born: 17 April 1967 (age 59); Karachi, Sindh, Pakistan
- Batting: Right-handed
- Bowling: Right-arm medium

Career statistics
Competition	First-class	List A
Matches	142	103
Runs scored	7,420	2,636
Batting average	35.00	30.65
100s/50s	10/48	4/13
Top score	160	153*
Balls bowled	2,669	169
Wickets	35	2
Bowling average	44.31	78.50
5 wickets in innings	0	0
10 wickets in match	0	–
Best bowling	3/39	1/18
Catches/stumpings	78/–	27/–
- Source: Cricinfo, 5 December 2022

Sohail Jaffar Ali (born 17 April 1967) is a former Pakistani cricketer who played first-class and List A cricket for Karachi, Pakistan National Shipping Corporation and Pakistan International Airlines from 1987 to 2002.

In the 2000/01 domestic season, playing for Pakistan International Airlines against Agriculture Development Bank of Pakistan, Jaffar put on an unbroken stand of 326 for the first wicket with Ghulam Ali. At the time it was the highest opening partnership in all List A cricket.
