= Abdur Raqib (cricketer) =

Pakistani cricketer (born 1947)

Personal information
- Born: 18 November 1947 (age 78); Gorakhpur
- Batting: Right-handed
- Bowling: Slow left-arm orthodox

Career statistics
Competition	First-class	List A
Matches	157	31
Runs scored	1,066	31
Batting average	9.96	4.42
100s/50s	0/1	0/0
Top score	62*	10
Balls bowled	34,820	1.380
Wickets	643	40
Bowling average	21.61	22.95
5 wickets in innings	39	0
10 wickets in match	9	0
Best bowling	8/62	4/29
Catches/stumpings	119/–	7/–
- Source: CricketArchive, 5 December 2022

Abdur Raqib Ali (born 18 November 1947) is a Pakistani former first-class cricketer who was born in India. A prolific slow left-arm orthodox bowler, Abdur Raqib took 643 wickets in his career which lasted over 20 years.
