= Aamer Wasim =

Pakistani cricketer (1960–2018)

Personal information
- Born: 28 October 1960; Sialkot, Pakistan
- Died: 26 September 2018 (aged 57)
- Source: Cricinfo, 15 June 2016

Aamer Wasim (28 October 1960 – 26 September 2018), also spelled as Amir Waseem, was a Pakistani cricketer. He played 67 first-class and 46 List A matches for several domestic sides in Pakistan between 1983 and 2003.

== Early life ==
Wasim was born on October 28, 1960, in Sialkot, Punjab, Pakistan.

== Career ==
Wasim's first-class career began with Gujranwala, and he later played for first-class cricket teams such as Railways (1986-1996), Pakistan Automobiles Corporation (1987/88), Pakistan Customs (1998-2000), Biman Bangladesh Airlines (2000/01), and Sialkot (2001/02).

In his first-class career, Wasim took 242 wickets with an average of 26.61, and a best bowling figure of 7-169. His List A career saw him taking 56 wickets with an average of 27.51 and a best bowling figure of 4-14. Throughout his career, Wasim exhibited consistent performance, as evidenced by his strike rates of 61.57 and 42.71 in first-class and List A cricket respectively.

Waseem, alongside Abdur Rauf, Fazl-e-Akbar, and Taj Wali, holds the record of achieving two hat-tricks in the Quaid-e-Azam Trophy. Besides his own accolades, Waseem is also recognized for mentoring Bilal Asif in off-spinning at Tony Cricket Club in Sialkot. His guidance endured until 2008, when Asif relocated to Kuwait to aid his father. Waseem also established a cricket academy named after him, where cricketers such as Abdullah Shafique, Mohammad Ali, and Usama Mir have received training.
