= Shahsufi Aminur Rahman =

Hazrat Shah Sufi Aminur Rahman
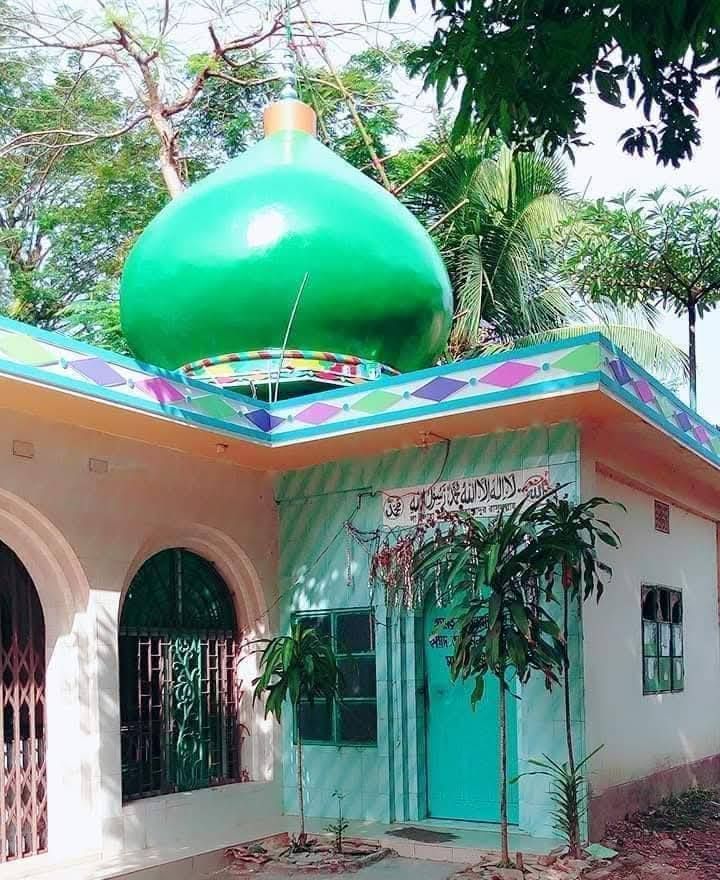
- Shrine of Shahsufi Aminur Rahman
- Born: Aminur Rahman; 1917; Oskhain, Anwara Upazila, Chittagong , Bengal Presidency, British India
- Died: June 10, 1993 (aged 76); Oskhain, Anwara Upazila, Chittagong , Bangladesh
- Resting place: Oskhain Darbar Sharif Mosque premises, Anwara Upazila, Chittagong
- Citizenship: Bangladeshi
- Education: Al-Jameatul Arabiatul Islamia Ziri
- Occupations: Islamic scholar, Sufi teacher, poet
- Era: 20th century
- Title: Mufti-e-Azam
- Spouse: Zaheda Khatun
- Children: 8 (including Nurul Rashid Akhtar Shah Noor Siddiqui)
- Parents: Shah Sufi Habibur Rahman (father); Chemon Ara Bibi (mother)

Shahsufi Aminur Rahman (1917-1993), also known as Mufti-e-Azam Aminur Rahman Miah, was an Islamic scholar and Sufi figure from Chittagong, Bangladesh. He wwas born in Oshkhain village. Anwara Upazila. He was a descendant and grandson of the medieval Bengali poet Ali Raza. His father name is Shah Sufi Habibur Rahman and mother name is Chemon Ara bibi. After the death of his father he was raised by his mother. After completed primary education he studied Islamic and Jurisprudence (Fiqh) at Al-Jamiah Al-Arabiya Al-Islamic Ziri in Patiya Upazila.

His father died shortly before his birth. Traditional biographical accounts also attribute his spiritual initiation (ba''yah) to a prenatal period.

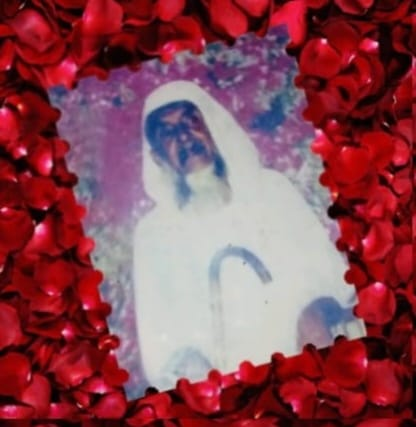
A rare photograph of Shah Sufi Aminur Rahman.

He married Zaheda Khatun. His eldest son Nurul Rashid Akhtar Shah Noor Siddiqui, was a Sufi figure and writer. Shah Sufi Aminur Rahman received spiritual training under a Sufi teacher and became associated with various Sufi orders, including the Qadiri Order, Chishti Order, and Naqshbandi Order. Alongside his work in Islamic theology, Jurisprudence, and exegesis, he authored Sufi poetry and ghazals. Most of the time of his life en engaged with education, religious guidance and activities of Tariqa (Spiritual path) .

He died on 10 June 1993 and was buried on the northern side of the Oskhain Darbar Sharif mosque.
