= Sajjad Akbar =

Pakistani cricketer (1961–2024)

Personal information
- Born: 1 March 1961; Lahore, West Pakistan, Pakistan
- Died: 21 May 2024 (aged 63)
- Batting: Right-handed
- Bowling: Right-arm offbreak

International information
- National side: Pakistan

Career statistics
Competition	ODI	FC	LA
Matches	2	182	119
Runs scored	5	6,571	1,607
Batting average	5.00	30.42	24.72
100s/50s	0/0	7/31	0/9
Top score	5	143	71*
Balls bowled	60	38,652	5,596
Wickets	2	640	142
Bowling average	22.50	25.40	27.71
5 wickets in innings	0	37	1
10 wickets in match	0	8	0
Best bowling	2/45	9/59	6/46
Catches/stumpings	0/–	119/–	36/–
- Source: Cricinfo, 11 April 2013

Sajjad Akbar (Urdu: سجاد اکبر; 1 March 1961 – 21 May 2024) was a Pakistani cricketer and later coach who played two One Day Internationals for Pakistan in 1990.

A middle-order batsman and off-spin bowler, he played first-class cricket in Pakistan from 1978–79 to 2000–01. In the 1989–90 season, he took 104 wickets at an average of 22.38. Playing for the Pakistan National Shipping Corporation against Karachi in 1987–88, he took 9 for 59 and 6 for 63.

Akbar died from a heart attack on 21 May 2024, at the age of 63.
