= Abdullah Khan (cricketer) =

Pakistani cricketer (born 1965)

Personal information
- Born: 27 November 2001 (age 24); Multan, Pakistan
- Source: Cricinfo, February 2016

Abdullah Khan (born 15 February 1965) is a Pakistani first-class cricketer who played for Karachi and Pakistan Steels. He played 35 First-class and 26 List A cricket games.
