= Ali Raza (cricketer, born 1974) =

Pakistani cricketer (born 1974)

Personal information
- Born: 10 December 1974 (age 51); Karachi, Pakistan
- Source: Cricinfo, 7 April 2016

Ali Raza (born 10 December 1974) is a Pakistani former first-class cricketer who played for several domestic teams in Pakistan between 1996 and 2003.
