= Ghulam Ali (cricketer) =

Pakistani cricketer (born 1966)

Personal information
- Full name: Ghulam Ali Ansari
- Born: 8 September 1966 (age 60); Karachi, Sindh, Pakistan
- Batting: Right-handed
- Bowling: Right-arm medium

International information
- National side: Pakistan
- ODI debut: 25 February 1993 v West Indies
- Last ODI: 8 April 1995 v Bangladesh

Career statistics
| Competition | ODI | FC | LA |
|---|---|---|---|
| Matches | 3 | 167 | 163 |
| Runs scored | 53 | 9973 | 5201 |
| Batting average | 17.66 | 40.05 | 35.14 |
| 100s/50s | 0/0 | 23/52 | 6/35 |
| Top score | 38 | 224 | 156* |
| Balls bowled | 0 | 1145 | 365 |
| Wickets | - | 24 | 8 |
| Bowling average | – | 25.37 | 41.87 |
| 5 wickets in innings | – | 1 | 0 |
| 10 wickets in match | – | n/a | 0 |
| Best bowling | – | 5/43 | 2/29 |
| Catches/stumpings | 0/– | 108/– | 57/– |
- Source: Cricinfo, 25 April 2006

Ghulam Ali Ansari (born 8 September 1966) is a Pakistani former cricketer who played three ODIs from 1993 to 1995. He played first-class and List A cricket for various teams in Pakistan's domestic competitions between 1990 and 2006.

In the 2000/01 domestic season, playing for Pakistan International Airlines against Agriculture Development Bank of Pakistan, Ali (155*) put on an unbroken stand of 326 for the first wicket with Sohail Jaffar (153*). At the time, it was the world's highest opening partnership in all List-A cricket.
