= Industrial Development Bank of Pakistan cricket team =

Cricket team

Industrial Development Bank of Pakistan were a Pakistani first-class cricket team sponsored by the Industrial Development Bank of Pakistan. They played in the Quaid-e-Azam Trophy from 1979–80 to 1981–82.

== Playing record ==
Industrial Development Bank of Pakistan played 20 first-class matches, with five wins, 11 losses and four draws. They qualified for the Quaid-e-Azam Trophy in 1979–80 by winning the Patron's Trophy, which did not have first-class status that season.

== Leading players ==
Saleem Yousuf made the team's highest score, 115, against United Bank Limited in 1981–82. He was also the team's overall highest scorer, with 1471 runs in 19 matches at an average of 39.75.

Jalaluddin (who captained the team in 1981–82) had the best innings bowling figures, 7 for 43 against Pakistan Railways in 1981–82. He also took most wickets overall, with 70 at an average of 25.45. The best match bowling figures were by Tanvir Ali, who took 13 for 145 (7 for 76 and 6 for 69) against Pakistan International Airlines in 1980–81 in his second first-class match.
