= Saleem Yousuf =

Pakistani cricketer (born 1959)

Personal information
- Born: 7 December 1959 (age 66); Karachi, Sindh, Pakistan
- Batting: Right-handed
- Role: Wicket-keeper

International information
- National side: Pakistan
- Test debut (cap 91): 5 March 1982 v Sri Lanka
- Last Test: 15 November 1990 v West Indies
- ODI debut (cap 40): 12 March 1982 v Sri Lanka
- Last ODI: 21 December 1990 v Sri Lanka

Career statistics
Competition	Test	ODI
Matches	32	86
Runs scored	1,055	768
Batting average	27.05	17.86
100s/50s	0/5	0/4
Top score	91*	62
Catches/stumpings	91/13	81/22
- Source: CricInfo, 4 February 2006

Saleem Yousuf (born 7 December 1959) is a Pakistani former international cricketer who played in 32 Test matches and 86 One Day Internationals between 1982 and 1990. As a wicketkeeper for the Pakistan national team, he was a "worthy successor" to Wasim Bari, and not only "proved his worth behind the wickets on innumerable occasions" but "also strengthened Pakistan's batting lower down the order through his powerful stroke play".

== Cricket career ==
He made his highest Test score of 91 not out against England at Edgbaston in 1987. One of his most memorable innings was against the West Indies in the 1987 World Cup, which turned certain defeat into victory for Pakistan.

In 1990, Saleem Yousuf became the first wicketkeeper to record three stumpings in an ODI innings and still jointly holds the record for most stumpings in a single ODI innings.

=== India ===
He had some notable performances against India.

In the Bangalore Test of 1986–87, played on a sharply turning surface after four drawn matches, Pakistan trailed by 29 on first innings and slipped to 184/7 when Saleem Yousuf came in. After Imran Khan's dismissal at 198, Yousuf countered the spinners with a composed 41 and stitched a crucial 59-run ninth-wicket stand with Tauseef Ahmed, contributions that proved match-defining in a 16-run Pakistan victory over India.

At Sharjah in 1990 during the Austral-Asia Cup, Yousuf was promoted up the order and again led the way against India, top-scoring with 62—the only Pakistan innings above forty—to set 235/9. Waqar Younis then spearheaded the attack to dismiss India for 209, sealing the result.

== Post-retirement ==
After retirement, he served on the Selection Committee for the Pakistan Cricket Board. He presently serves as Principal Appraiser in the Pakistan Customs Service.

He is currently one of the members of the advisory board of PSL's franchise Karachi Kings.
