= Pakistan National Shipping Corporation cricket team =

Cricket team

Pakistan National Shipping Corporation were a Pakistani first-class cricket team sponsored by the Pakistan National Shipping Corporation. They played in the Quaid-e-Azam Trophy and the Patron's Trophy from 1986–87 to 1999–2000.

== Playing record ==
They played a total of 111 first-class matches, with 26 wins, 33 losses and 52 draws. They reached the semi-finals of the Patron's Trophy in 1986–87, 1992–93 and 1995–96, and of the Quaid-e-Azam Trophy in 1989–90.

== Leading players ==
Sajjad Akbar played 107 matches for Pakistan National Shipping Corporation, scoring 4088 runs at an average of 30.28, taking 379 wickets at 26.60, and captaining the side from 1993–94 to 1996–97. He had the side's best bowling figures – 9 for 59 in the first innings and 15 for 122 in the match – in the victory over Karachi in 1987–88. His predecessor as captain, Amin Lakhani, led the side from 1986–87 to 1992–93, playing 58 matches and taking 244 wickets at 26.42.

The highest score was 160, by Sohail Jaffar against National Bank of Pakistan in 1992–93. In 61 matches for Pakistan National Shipping Corporation he scored 3479 runs at 35.86.
