= Pakistan Automobiles Corporation cricket team =

Cricket team

Pakistan Automobiles Corporation (sometimes abbreviated to PACO) were a first-class cricket side in Pakistan that played in the Patron's Trophy, the Quaid-e-Azam Trophy and the Pentangular Trophy between 1983–84 and 1993–94. Their most successful era was in the early 1980s under the captaincy of Shahid Mahboob.

In all they played 83 first-class matches, with 20 wins, 21 losses and 42 draws. Their highest score was 201 not out by Ijaz Ahmed against Karachi in 1984–85. The best bowling figures were 8 for 65 by Shahid Mahboob against House Building Finance Corporation in 1986–87. He also took seven wickets in an innings for Pakistan Automobiles Corporation on seven occasions, and in 59 matches for the team took 270 wickets at an average of 27.02.

== Honours ==
- Patron's Trophy (1)
- 1982-83 (not considered first-class in this season)
- Pentangular Trophy (1)
- 1984-85 (not considered first-class in this season)

== See also ==
- List of Pakistan Automobiles Corporation cricketers
