= 1983–84 Wills Cup =

1983–Wills Cup
- Dates: 9 February 1984 – 24 February 1984
- Administrator(s): BCCP
- Cricket format: Limited overs (List A)
- Tournament format(s): Round-robin and knockout
- Champions: Habib Bank Limited (1st title)
- Runners-up: Pakistan International Airlines
- Participants: 12
- Matches: 33
- Player of the series: Agha Zahid (HBL)
- Most runs: Saadat Ali (291)
- Most wickets: Naeem Ahmed (13)

The 1983–84 Wills Cup was the fourth edition of the Wills Cup, which was the premiere domestic limited overs cricket competition in Pakistan and afforded List A status. Twelve teams participated in the competition which was held from 8 to 27 September 1985.

== Venues ==
Venues for the Wills Cup 1983–84

== Group stage ==
=== Group A ===
Pos	Team	Pld	W	L	NR	Pts	NRR
1	United Bank Limited	5	5	0	0	20	0.598
2	Pakistan International Airlines	5	4	1	0	16	0.712
3	Karachi	5	3	2	0	12	−0.549
4	Allied Bank Limited	5	2	3	0	8	−0.029
5	State Bank	5	1	4	0	4	−0.113
6	Railways	5	0	5	0	0	−1.617

Note: Top two teams will qualify for the semifinals.

=== Group B ===
==== Points Table ====
Pos	Team	Pld	W	L	NR	Pts	NRR
1	Habib Bank Limited	5	4	1	0	16	0.623
2	House Building Finance	5	4	1	0	16	0.219
3	Muslim Commercial Bank	5	3	2	0	12	−0.001
4	Pakistan Automobiles Corporation	5	2	3	0	8	0.309
5	National Bank	5	2	3	0	8	−0.156
6	Lahore City	5	0	5	0	0	−0.857

Note: Top two teams will qualify for the semifinals.

== Semi-finals ==
22 February
10:00 PST
Scorecard

United Bank Limited; 124 (42.5 overs)	v	Habib Bank Limited; 128/2 (31.3 overs)
Nasir Valika 34; Abdul Qadir 3/27 (7.5 overs)		Saleem Malik 52*; Tauseef Ahmed 1/31 (6 overs)

Habib Bank Limited won by 8 wickets
Niaz Stadium, Hyderabad
Umpires: Ghafoor Butt and Shakeel Khan
Player of the match: Saleem Malik (HBL)

- Habib Bank Limited won the toss and elected to field.

22 February
10:00 PST
Scorecard

Pakistan International Airlines; 218 (44.3 overs)	v	House Building Finance; 213 (45 overs)
Zaheer Abbas 75; Noor-ul-Qamar 3/43 (9 overs)		Saadat Ali 73; Naeem Ahmed 3/46 (9 overs)

Pakistan International Airlines won by 5 runs
National Stadium, Karachi
Umpires: Ghafoor Butt and Tahir Hassan
Player of the match: Saleem Malik (HBL)

- Pakistan International Airlines won the toss and elected to bat.

== Final ==
24 February
10:00 PST
Scorecard

Habib Bank Limited; 182/3 (41 overs)	v	Pakistan International Airlines; 181 (39.4 overs)
Mohsin Khan 86; Raja Akber 2/19 (7 overs)		Shoaib Mohammad 51; Abdul Qadir 3/49 (9 overs)

Habib Bank Limited won by 7 wickets
Gaddafi Stadium, Lahore
Umpires: Khizer Hayat and Shakoor Rana
Player of the match: Mohsin Khan (HBL)

- Pakistan International Airlines won the toss and elected to bat.

== Statistics ==
=== Most Runs ===
Player	Team	Mat	Inns	Runs	HS
Saadat Ali	House Building Finance	6	6	291	73
Zaheer Abbas	Pakistan International Airlines	7	7	284	75
Agha Zahid	Habib Bank Limited	7	7	259	79
Arshad Pervez	Habib Bank Limited	7	7	223	63*
Qasim Umar	Muslim Commercial Bank	3	3	215	102

- Source: ESPNcricinfo

=== Most wickets ===
Player	Team	Mat	Inns	Wkts	BBI
Naeem Ahmed	Pakistan International Airlines	7	7	13	4/36
Shahid Mahboob	Pakistan Automobiles Corporation	4	4	11	5/52
Mohinder Kumar	Karachi	5	5	11	4/18
Zahid Ahmed	Pakistan International Airlines	7	7	11	4/17
Feroz Najamuddin	Allied Bank Limited	4	4	10	5/33

- Source: ESPNcricinfo
