= List of Pakistan Universities cricketers =

This is a list of cricketers who have played matches for the Pakistan Universities cricket team.

== Notable players ==
- Mohammad Afzal
- Agha Saadat Ali
- Asif Ahmed
- Ijaz Ahmed
- Imtiaz Ahmed
- Naeem Ahmed
- Saeed Ahmed
- Haseeb Ahsan
- Masood Akhtar
- Ashraf Ali
- Masroor Ali
- Khalid Aziz
- Javed Burki
- Ijaz Butt
- Farooq Azeem
- Fasihuddin
- Aftab Gul
- Aamer Hameed
- Waqar Hasan
- Afaq Hussain
- Mahmood Hussain
- Hasan Jamil
- Azhar Khan
- Ghaffar Khan
- Majid Khan
- Mohsin Khan
- Nadeem Khan
- Amin Lakhani
- Rashid Latif
- Shahid Mahmood
- Asif Masood
- Parvez Mir
- Khan Mohammad
- Nasim-ul-Ghani
- Mudassar Nazar
- Arshad Pervez
- Wasim Raja
- Sultan Rana
- Asad Rauf
- Fazal-ur-Rehman
- Baqar Rizvi
- Salahuddin (cricketer)
- Agha Zahid
- Humayun Zaman
- Ali Zia
