= List of House Building Finance Corporation cricketers =

List of cricketers

This is a list of all cricketers who have played first-class or List A matches for House Building Finance Corporation cricket team. The team played 105 first-class matches between 1976 and 1993 and 72 List A matches between 1981 and 1993. Seasons given are first and last seasons; the player did not necessarily play in all the intervening seasons.

== Notable players ==
- Aamer Khurshid, 1987/88-1996/97
- Abdul Hameed, 1976/77
- Abdul Jalil, 1979/80
- Abid Ali, 1976/77
- Aftab Ahmed, 1979/80-1980/81
- Agha Irshad, 1978/79-1980/81
- Ali Ahmed, 1983/84-1993/94
- Ali Zia, 1976/77
- Altaf Shah, 1976/77-1978/79
- Anwar Jamil, 1976/77
- Arshad Nawaz, 1976/77
- Asif Nazir, 1976/77-1980/81
- Ataullah Khan, 1993/94
- Athar Khan, 1979/80-1980/81
- Babar Basharat, 1976/77
- Ehteshamuddin, 1977/78
- Faisal Qureshi, 1989/90-1996/97
- Iftikhar Ahmed, 1979/80-1980/81
- Ijaz Ahmed, 1983/84-1986/87
- Ijaz Elahi, 1993/94
- Ijaz Saeed, 1980/81-1983/84
- Irshad Ahmed, 1977/78-1984/85
- Izhar Ahmed, 1976/77-1987/88
- Jahangir Khan sen, 1993/94
- Javed Sadiq, 1976/77-1984/85
- Kabir Khan, 1991/92-1993/94
- Kazim Mehdi, 1979/80-1995/96
- Maqsood Hussain, 1980/81
- Mohammad Islam, 1980/81
- Mohammad Jamil, 1976/77
- Mohammad Javed jun, 1983/84-1985/86
- Mohammad Riaz, 1988/89
- Mohinder Kumar, 1985/86-1994/95
- Mohsin Akhtar, 1978/79
- Mohtashim Rasheed, 1993/94
- Monis Qadri, 1989/90-1993/94
- Munir-ul-Haq, 1983/84-1997/98
- Muzammil Izhar, 1990/91
- Noor-ul-Qamar, 1979/80-1986/87
- Nusrat Mahboob, 1992/93-1995/96
- Pervez Akhtar, 1976/77-1995/96
- Pervez-ul-Hasan, 1990/91-1993/94
- Qamar Zaidi, 1976/77-1979/80
- Raees Ahmed, 1978/79-1986/87
- Rafat Alam, 1979/80-1994/95
- Rashid Ahmed, 1990/91
- Rashid Usman, 1977/78
- Rehmatullah, 1980/81
- Saadat Ali, 1983/84-1989/90
- Saeed Anjum, 1978/79-1980/81
- Sagheer Abbas, 1983/84-1988/89
- Saleem Taj, 1984/85-1994/95
- Saleemuddin, 1976/77-1980/81
- Sarfraz Azeem, 1989/90-1990/91
- Sarfraz Hasan, 1976/77-1983/84
- Shafiq Ahmed, 1976/77-1980/81
- Shahid Khan, 1993/94
- Shahid Saeed, 1986/87-1995/96
- Shahzad Ilyas, 1987/88-1993/94
- Shaukat Mirza, 1985/86-1986/87
- Sibtain Haider, 1986/87
- Sohail Khan, 1986/87-1995/96
- Sohail Taqi, 1992/93
- Tahir Rasheed, 1983/84-1986/87
- Tariq Alam, 1978/79-1997/98
- Tariq Bashir, 1976/77
- Tariq Khan, 1993/94
- Tariq Nazar, 1986/87
- Tariq Wahab, 1983/84-1984/85
- Taufiq Tirmizi, 1977/78-1980/81
- Wasim Ali, 1989/90-1993/94
- Wasim Arif, 1984/85-1988/89
- Wasim Yousufi, 1991/92-1993/94
- Zahoor Elahi, 1988/89
- Zulfiqar Butt, 1988/89-1992/93
- Zulqarnain, 1989/90-1990/91
