= 1985–86 Wills Cup =

- Dates: 8 September 1985 – 27 September 1985
- Administrator(s): BCCP
- Cricket format: Limited overs (List A)
- Tournament format(s): Round-robin and knockout
- Champions: Pakistan International Airlines (4th title)
- Runners-up: United Bank Limited
- Participants: 11
- Matches: 25

The 1985–86 Wills Cup was the fifth edition of the Wills Cup, which was the premiere domestic limited overs cricket competition in Pakistan and afforded List A status. Eleven teams participated in the competition which was held from 8 to 27 September 1985.

== Venues ==
Venues for the Wills Cup 1985–86

== Group stage ==
=== Group A ===
==== Points Table ====
Team	Pld	W	L	NR	NRR	Pts
United Bank Limited	4	4	0	0	+5.263	16
Pakistan International Airlines	4	3	1	0	+5.084	12
Karachi	4	2	2	0	+4.834	8
Muslim Commercial Bank	4	1	3	0	-4.397	4
Railways	4	0	4	0	-3.852	0

=== Group B ===
==== Points Table ====
Team	Pld	W	L	NR	NRR	Pts
Habib Bank Limited	5	4	0	0	+4.180	18
Lahore City	5	3	2	0	+4.405	12
National Bank	5	3	2	0	+4.122	12
Pakistan Automobiles Corporation	5	1	2	1	+3.857	8
House Building Finance	5	1	3	1	-4.311	6
WAPDA	5	1	4	0	-3.425	4

== Semi-finals ==
20 September
Scorecard

Habib Bank Limited; 120 (34.2 overs)	v	Pakistan International Airlines; 123/2 (34.2 overs)
Saleem Malik 38; Azeem Hafeez 4/22 (6.2 overs)		Asif Muhammad 44; Nauman Shabbir 1/9 (7 overs)

Pakistan International Airlines won by 8 wickets
Army Stadium, Rawalpindi
Player of the match: Azeem Hafeez (PIA)

- Pakistan International Airlines won the toss and elected to field.

20 September
Scorecard

Lahore City; 175/6 (45 overs)	v	United Bank Limited; 179/5 (43.3 overs)
Ghaffar Kazmi 52; Kamal Merchant 3/26 (8 overs)		Ali Zia 51 not out Ghayyur Qureshi 2/20 (9 overs)

United Bank Limited won by 5 wickets
National Stadium, Karachi
Umpires: Feroz Butt and Shakeel Khan
Player of the match: Ali Zia (UB)

- United Bank Limited won the toss and elected to field.

== Final ==
27 September
Scorecard

Pakistan International Airlines; 257/3 (45 overs)	v	United Bank Limited; 254/9 (45 overs)
Shoaib Mohammad 111 not out Naved Anjum 1/32 (7 overs)		Saadat Ali 83; Shoaib Mohammad 2/40 (9 overs)

Pakistan International Airlines won by 3 runs
National Stadium, Karachi
Umpires: Mahboob Khan and Shakeel Khan
Player of the match: Shoaib Mohammad (PIA)

- United Bank Limited won the toss and elected to field.
