= Indian cricket team in Pakistan in 1989–90 =

International cricket tour

Indians in Pakistan in 1989-90
	India	Pakistan
- Dates: 11 November 1989 – 22 December 1989
Captains	K Srikkanth	Imran Khan

Test series
- Result: 4-match series drawn 0–0
Most runs	Sanjay Manjrekar (569)	Shoaib Mohammad (412)
Most wickets	Manoj Prabhakar (16)	Wasim Akram (18)

One Day International series
- Results: Pakistan won the 4-match series 2–0
Most runs	K Srikkanth (48)	Saeed Anwar (49)
Most wickets	Imran Khan (5); Aaqib Javed (5)	Manoj Prabhakar (5)

The India national cricket team toured the Pakistan during the 1989–90 cricket season. India played four Test and One Day International matches each, and three other matches between 11 November and 22 December 1989, against the Pakistan cricket team. The Test series was drawn 0–0 and Pakistan won the ODI series 2–0. The tour marked the international debut of Sachin Tendulkar.

== Touring party ==
India's 16-member squad for the tour was announced on 5 November 1989. Krishnamachari Srikkanth was retained as captain. Dilip Vengsarkar opted out because of mental and physical staleness, while Arun Lal, Mohinder Amarnath, Atul Wassan and Venkatapathy Raju were excluded. 20-year-old Delhi medium-fast bowler Vivek Razdan, the first player to come through the MRF Pace Foundation, and 16-year-old Mumbai batsman Sachin Tendulkar were added as replacements. Chandu Borde was the tour manager. The party left New Delhi for Lahore on 9 November.

The squad included:

- K Srikkanth (c)
- Ravi Shastri (vc)
- Salil Ankola
- Arshad Ayub
- Mohammad Azharuddin
- Kapil Dev
- Raman Lamba
- Maninder Singh
- Sanjay Manjrekar
- Kiran More
- Manoj Prabhakar
- Woorkeri Raman
- Vivek Razdan
- Ajay Sharma
- Navjot Singh Sidhu
- Sachin Tendulkar

== Tour matches ==
=== One-day: Pakistan XI v India XI ===
10 November 1989
Scorecard

Pakistan XI; 187/7 (37 overs)	v	India XI; 183/7 (37 overs)
Rameez Raja 56; Vivek Razdan 3/42		Navjot Singh Sidhu 69; Abdul Qadir 3/39

Pakistan XI won by 4 runs
Gaddafi Stadium, Lahore

The match was played at the Gaddafi Stadium in Lahore to raise funds for Shaukat Khanum Memorial Cancer Hospital and Research Centre, the brainchild of Pakistan captain Imran Khan.

=== Three-day: Cricket Board Patron's XI v Indians ===
11–13 November 1989
Scorecard

Cricket Board Patron's XI	v	Indians
234 (63 overs); Akram Raza 62; Salil Ankola 6/77 (17 overs)		272 (75.5 overs); Raman Lamba 62; Shahid Saeed 4/10 (3.5 overs)
301/4 (62 overs); Saeed Anwar 150

Match drawn
Army Stadium, Rawalpindi
Umpires: Javed Akhtar and Khizer Hayat

- Cricket Board Patron's XI won the toss and elected to bat.

=== Exhibition: Pakistan XI v India XI ===
16 December 1989
Scorecard

Pakistan XI; 157/4 (20 overs)	v	India XI; 153/3 (20 overs)
Saleem Malik 75; Salil Ankola 1/3 (2 overs)		Sachin Tendulkar 53* (18); Mushtaq Ahmed 2/23 (2 overs)

Pakistan won by 4 runs
Arbab Niaz Stadium, Peshawar
Umpires: Javed Akhtar and Khizer Hayat

- India won the toss and elected to field.
- This 20-over-per-side match was played after the ODI was abandoned because of bad light.

== Test matches ==
=== 1st Test ===
15–20 November 1989
Scorecard

Pakistan	v	India
409 (116.5 overs); Imran Khan 109* (146); Manoj Prabhakar 5/104 (34.5 overs)		262 (72.2 overs); Kiran More 58* (96); Waqar Younis 4/80 (19 overs)
305/5d (96 overs); Saleem Malik 102* (145); Kapil Dev 3/82 (36 overs)		303/3 (96 overs); Sanjay Manjrekar 113* (243); Imran Khan 1/56 (28 overs)

Match drawn
National Stadium, Karachi
Umpires: John Hampshire (Eng) and John Holder (Eng)
Player of the match: Kapil Dev (Ind)

- India won the toss and decided to field.
- Salil Ankola and Sachin Tendulkar (both Ind), and Shahid Saeed and Waqar Younis (both Pak) made their Test debuts. Tendulkar became India's youngest ever Test debutant (16 years, 205 days) and third overall.
- Kapil Dev (Ind) became the first bowler to play 100 Tests. He claimed his 350th Test wicket in the match.
- 18 November was a rest day.

=== 2nd Test ===
23–28 November 1989
Scorecard

India	v	Pakistan
288 (113.1 overs); Sanjay Manjrekar 76 (240); Imran Khan 4/45 (26.1 overs)		423/9d (132.3 overs); Aamer Malik 117 (205); Manoj Prabhakar 6/132 (42.3 overs)
398/7 (116 overs); Mohammad Azharuddin 109 (174); Wasim Akram 2/86 (31 overs)

Match drawn
Iqbal Stadium, Faisalabad
Umpires: John Hampshire (Eng) and John Holder (Eng)
Player of the match: Sanjay Manjrekar (Ind)

- Pakistan won the toss and decided to field.
- Nadeem Abbasi, Naved Anjum (both Pak) and Vivek Razdan (Ind) all made their Test debuts.
- 26 November was a rest day.

=== 3rd Test ===
1–6 December 1989
Scorecard

India	v	Pakistan
509 (178.2 overs); Sanjay Manjrekar 218 (401); Abdul Qadir 3/97 (35 overs)		699/5 (203.4 overs); Shoaib Mohammad 203* (338); Ravi Shastri 2/104 (26.4 overs)

Match drawn
Gaddafi Stadium, Lahore
Umpires: John Hampshire (Eng) and John Holder (Eng)
Player of the match: Sanjay Manjrekar

- India won the toss and decided to bat.
- Akram Raza and Shahid Mahboob (Pak) both made their test debuts.
- 4 December was a rest day.

=== 4th Test ===
9–14 December 1989
Scorecard

India	v	Pakistan
324 (84.2 overs); Sanjay Manjrekar 72 (127); Wasim Akram 5/101 (28.2 overs)		250 (103.4 overs); Rameez Raja 56 (143); Vivek Razdan 5/79 (27 overs)
234/7 (84 overs); Navjot Sidhu 97 (234); Imran Khan 3/68 (22 overs)

Match drawn
Jinnah Stadium, Sialkot
Umpires: John Hampshire (Eng) and John Holder (Eng)
Player of the match: Navjot Sidhu (Ind)

- Pakistan won the toss and decided to field.
- 12 December was a rest day.
- Vivek Razdan (Ind) took his maiden five-wicket haul in Tests.

== One Day Internationals (ODIs) ==
Pakistan won the Wills Challenge 2–0, with one no result and one match abandoned.

=== 1st ODI ===
16 December 1989
Scorecard

Pakistan	v	India

Match abandoned
Arbab Niaz Stadium, Peshawar
Umpires: Javed Akhtar and Khizer Hayat

- No toss made.

=== 2nd ODI ===
18 December 1989
Scorecard

Pakistan; 87/9 (16 overs)	v	India; 80/9 (16 overs)
Saeed Anwar 42* (32); Maninder Singh 2/17 (4 overs)		M Azharuddin 21 (19); Waqar Younis 3/21 (4 overs)

Pakistan won by 7 runs
Municipal Stadium, Gujranwala
Umpires: Feroze Butt and Mohammad Aslam
Player of the match: Saeed Anwar (PAK)

- India won the toss and elected to field.
- The match was reduced before play started to 20 overs per side, and was later reduced to 16 overs per side.
- SA Ankola, V Razdan and SR Tendulkar (all IND) made their ODI debuts.

=== 3rd ODI ===
20 December 1989
Scorecard

Pakistan; 28/3 (14.3 overs)	v	India
Shoaib Mohammad 13 (32); M Prabhakar 3/5 (5 overs)

No result
National Stadium, Karachi
Umpires: Mahboob Shah and Saleem Badar

- India won the toss and elected to field.
- Match abandoned due to crowd disruption.

=== 4th ODI ===
22 December 1989
Scorecard

Pakistan; 150/8 (37 overs)	v	India; 112 (30.2 overs)
Javed Miandad 30 (52); M Prabhakar 2/24 (8 overs)		K Srikkanth 31 (63); Aaqib Javed 3/28 (8 overs)

Pakistan won by 38 runs
Gaddafi Stadium, Lahore
Umpires: Khalid Aziz and Shakoor Rana
Player of the match: Aaqib Javed (PAK)

- India won the toss and elected to field.
- The match was reduced before play started to 37 overs per side.
