= Income Tax Department cricket team =

Cricket team

The Income Tax Department cricket team played first-class cricket in Pakistan from 1975 to 1979, competing in the Patron's Trophy.

== First-class playing record ==
Income Tax Department played eight matches over four seasons, winning one, losing three and drawing four. In 1977–78, after defeating Peshawar by two wickets, they progressed to the semi-finals, where they were overwhelmed by Habib Bank Limited, for whom Arshad Pervez and Mohsin Khan put on 426 for the second wicket.

== Best performances ==
Saadat Ali played all eight matches, scoring 942 runs at an average of 62.80, and taking 17 wickets at 30.29. He made the team's highest score, 277 against Bahawalpur in 1976–77. The best bowling figures were 8 for 82 (13 for 165 in the match) by Saud Khan against Lahore A in 1977–78.

== Notable players ==
- Ijaz Ahmed (cricketer, born 1960)
- Ashraf Ali (cricketer, born 1958)
- Saadat Ali
- Mohammad Naeem (cricketer, born 1959)

== Current status ==
Income Tax Department teams have continued to play at sub-first-class level. They compete in Grade II of the Patron's Trophy.
