= List of Pakistan ODI cricketers =

This is a list of Pakistani One-day International cricketers. A One Day International, or an ODI, is an international cricket match between two representative teams, each having ODI status, as determined by the International Cricket Council (ICC). An ODI differs from Test matches in that the number of overs per team is limited, and that each team has only one innings. The list is arranged in the order in which each player won his first ODI cap. Where more than one player won his first ODI cap in the same match, those players are listed alphabetically.

== ODI cricketers ==
Statistics are correct as at 16 November 2025

Pakistani ODI cricketers				Batting					Bowling						Fielding	
Cap	Name	Career	Mat	Inn	NO	Runs	HS	Avg	Balls	Mdn	Runs	Wkt	Best	Avg	Ca	St
1	Asif Iqbal	1973–1979	10	8	2	330	62	55.00	592	7	378	16	4–56	23.62	7	-
2	Asif Masood	1973–1976	7	3	1	10	6	5.00	402	8	234	5	2–9	46.80	1	-
3	Intikhab Alam	1973–1976	4	2	0	17	10	8.50	158	2	118	4	2–36	29.50	0	-
4	Majid Khan	1973–1982	23	22	1	786	109	37.42	658	11	374	13	3–27	28.76	3	-
5	Mushtaq Mohammad	1973–1978	10	9	3	209	55	34.83	42	-	23	-	-	-	3	-
6	Nasim-ul-Ghani	1973	1	1	0	1	1	1.00	-	-	-	-	-	-	0	-
7	Sadiq Mohammad	1973–1980	19	19	1	383	74	21.27	38	1	26	2	2–20	13.00	5	-
8	Saleem Altaf	1973–1978	6	2	1	25	21	25.00	285	2	151	5	2–7	30.20	1	-
9	Sarfraz Nawaz	1973–1984	45	31	8	221	34*	9.60	2412	49	1463	63	4–27	23.22	8	-
10	Wasim Bari	1973–1984	51	26	13	221	34	17.00	-	-	-	-	-	-	52	10
11	Wasim Raja	1973–1985	54	45	10	782	60	22.34	1036	10	687	21	4–25	32.71	24	-
12	Imran Khan	1974–1992	175	151	40	3709	102*	33.41	7461	124	4844	182	6–14	26.61	36	-
13	Zaheer Abbas	1974–1985	62	60	6	2572	123	47.62	280	2	223	7	2–26	31.85	16	-
14	Naseer Malik	1975	3	1	1	-	-	-	180	5	98	5	2–37	19.60	0	-
15	Javed Miandad	1975–1996	233	218	41	7381	119*	41.70	436	3	297	7	2–22	42.42	71	2
16	Pervez Mir	1975–1977	3	3	1	26	18	13.00	122	2	77	3	1–17	25.66	2	-
17	Mohsin Khan	1977–1986	75	75	5	1877	117*	26.81	12	0	5	1	1–2	5.00	13	-
18	Aamer Hameed	1977–1978	2	-	-	-	-	-	88	2	38	1	1–32	38.00	1	-
19	Hasan Jamil	1977–1978	6	5	-	111	28	22.20	232	3	154	8	3–18	19.25	1	-
20	Liaqat Ali	1977–1978	3	1	0	7	7	7.00	188	4	111	2	1–41	55.50	0	-
21	Mudassar Nazar	1977–1989	122	115	10	2653	95	25.26	4855	43	3432	111	5–28	30.91	21	-
22	Shafiq Ahmed	1977–1978	3	3	0	41	29	13.66	-	-	-	-	-	-	1	-
23	Haroon Rasheed	1977–1982	12	10	2	166	63*	20.75	-	-	-	-	-	-	3	-
24	Iqbal Qasim	1977–1988	15	7	1	39	13	6.50	664	12	500	12	3–13	41.66	3	-
25	Sikander Bakht	1977–1989	27	11	7	31	16*	7.75	1277	16	860	33	4–34	26.06	4	-
26	Arshad Pervez	1978	2	2	0	11	8	5.50	-	-	-	-	-	-	0	-
27	Naeem Ahmed	1978	1	1	1	0	0*	-	60	0	43	0	-	-	1	-
28	Azmat Rana	1978	2	2	1	42	22*	42.00	-	-	-	-	-	-	0	-
29	Mansoor Akhtar	1980–1990	41	35	1	593	47	17.44	138	2	110	2	1–7	55.00	14	-
30	Mohammad Nazir	1980–1984	4	3	3	4	2*	-	222	3	156	3	2–37	52.00	0	-
31	Taslim Arif	1980	2	2	0	28	24	14.00	-	-	-	-	-	-	1	1
32	Ashraf Ali	1980–1985	16	9	5	69	19*	17.25	-	-	-	-	-	-	17	3
33	Ijaz Faqih	1980–1988	27	19	3	197	42*	12.31	1116	6	819	13	4–43	63.00	2	-
34	Rashid Khan	1980–1985	29	15	7	110	17	13.75	1414	33	923	20	3–47	46.15	3	-
35	Saleem Pervez	1980	1	1	0	18	18	18.00	-	-	-	-	-	-	0	-
36	Tahir Naqqash	1980–1985	40	23	9	210	61	15.00	1596	15	1240	34	3–23	36.47	11	-
37	Rizwan-uz-Zaman	1981–1987	3	3	0	20	14	6.66	-	-	-	-	-	-	2	-
38	Saleem Malik	1982–1999	283	256	38	7170	102	32.88	3505	10	2959	89	5–35	33.24	81	-
39	Jalal-ud-din	1982–1983	8	2	0	5	5	2.50	306	7	211	14	4–32	15.07	1	-
40	Saleem Yousuf	1982–1990	86	62	19	768	62	17.86	-	-	-	-	-	-	81	22
41	Tauseef Ahmed	1982–1990	70	25	14	116	27*	10.54	3250	32	2247	55	4–38	40.85	10	-
42	Shahid Mahboob	1982–1984	10	6	1	119	77	23.80	540	8	382	7	1–23	54.57	1	-
43	Abdul Qadir	1983–1993	104	68	26	641	41*	15.26	5100	54	3454	132	5–44	26.16	21	-
44	Azeem Hafeez	1983–1985	15	10	7	45	15	15.00	719	3	586	15	4–22	39.06	3	-
45	Qasim Umar	1983–1987	31	31	3	642	69	22.92	-	-	-	-	-	-	4	-
46	Saadat Ali	1984	8	7	1	184	78*	30.66	27	0	29	2	2–24	14.50	1	-
47	Anil Dalpat	1984–1986	15	10	3	87	37	12.42	-	-	-	-	-	-	13	2
48	Naved Anjum	1984–1992	13	12	3	113	30	12.55	472	2	344	8	2–27	43.00	0	-
49	Manzoor Elahi	1984–1995	54	46	13	741	50*	22.45	1743	16	1262	29	3–22	43.51	21	-
50	Sajid Ali	1984–1997	13	12	0	130	28	10.83	-	-	-	-	-	-	1	-
51	Zakir Khan	1984–1990	17	5	4	27	11*	27.00	646	4	494	16	4–19	30.87	0	-
52	Shoaib Mohammad	1984–1993	63	58	6	1269	126*	24.40	919	2	725	20	3–20	36.25	13	-
53	Wasim Akram	1984–2003	356	280	55	3717	86	16.52	18186	238	11812	502	5–15	23.52	88	-
54	Mohsin Kamal	1984–1989	19	6	3	27	11*	9.00	881	4	760	21	4–47	36.19	4	-
55	Masood Iqbal	1984	1	1	0	2	2	2.00	-	-	-	-	-	-	0	-
56	Rameez Raja	1985–1997	198	197	15	5841	119*	32.09	6	0	10	0	-	-	33	-
57	Zulqarnain Zaidi	1985–1989	16	6	3	18	11*	6.00	-	-	-	-	-	-	18	5
58	Saleem Jaffar	1986–1990	39	13	11	36	10*	18.00	1900	18	1382	40	3–25	34.55	3	-
59	Asif Mujtaba	1986–1996	66	55	14	1068	113*	26.04	756	2	658	7	2–38	94.00	18	-
60	Ijaz Ahmed	1986–2000	250	232	29	6564	139*	32.33	637	1	476	5	2–31	95.20	90	-
61	Younis Ahmed	1987	2	2	0	84	58	42.00	-	-	-	-	-	-	1	-
62	Zahid Ahmed	1987	2	2	1	3	3*	3.00	96	1	61	3	2–24	20.33	0	-
63	Shakeel Khan	1987	1	1	0	-	-	-	54	0	50	1	1–50	50.00	0	-
64	Haafiz Shahid	1988	3	3	2	11	7*	11.00	127	1	112	3	2–56	37.33	0	-
65	Aamer Malik	1988–1994	24	23	1	556	90	25.27	120	1	86	3	2–35	28.66	13	3
66	Moin-ul-Atiq	1988–1989	5	5	0	199	105	39.80	-	-	-	-	-	-	0	-
67	Aaqib Javed	1988–1998	163	51	26	267	45*	10.68	8012	98	5721	182	7–37	31.43	24	-
68	Saeed Anwar	1989–2003	247	244	19	8823	194	39.21	242	3	191	6	2–9	31.83	42	-
69	Mushtaq Ahmed	1989–2003	144	76	34	399	34*	9.50	7543	51	5361	161	5–36	33.29	30	-
70	Shahid Saeed	1989–1993	10	10	0	141	50	14.10	222	1	159	3	2–20	53.00	2	-
71	Waqar Younis	1989–2003	262	139	45	969	37	10.30	12698	143	9919	416	7–36	23.84	35	-
72	Sohail Fazal	1989	2	2	0	56	32	28.00	6	0	4	0	-	-	1	-
73	Akram Raza	1989–1995	49	25	14	193	33*	17.54	2601	15	1611	38	3–18	42.39	19	-
74	Maqsood Rana	1990	1	1	0	5	5	5.00	12	0	11	0	-	-	0	-
75	Nadeem Ghauri	1990	6	3	2	14	7*	14.00	342	4	230	5	2–51	46.00	0	-
76	Sajjad Akbar	1990	2	1	0	5	5	5.00	60	1	45	2	2–45	22.50	0	-
77	Mansoor Rana	1990	2	2	0	15	10	7.50	6	0	7	0	-	-	0	-
78	Zahid Fazal	1990–1994	19	18	3	348	98*	23.20	-	-	-	-	-	-	2	-
79	Moin Khan	1990–2004	219	183	41	3266	72*	23.00	-	-	-	-	-	-	214	73
80	Aamer Sohail	1990–2000	156	155	5	4780	134	31.86	4836	17	3703	85	4–22	43.56	49	-
81	Inzamam-ul-Haq^{1}	1991–2007	375	348	52	11701	137*	39.53	58	1	64	3	1–0	21.33	113	-
82	Iqbal Sikander	1992	4	1	1	1	1*	-	210	2	147	3	1–30	49.00	0	-
83	Wasim Haider	1992	3	2	0	26	13	13.00	114	1	79	1	1–36	79.00	0	-
84	Tanvir Mehdi	1992	1	1	0	-	-	-	66	0	72	1	1–72	72.00	0	-
85	Rashid Latif	1992–2003	166	117	29	1709	79	19.42	-	-	-	-	-	-	182	38
86	Ata-ur-Rehman	1992–1996	30	13	6	34	11*	4.85	1492	7	1186	27	3–27	43.92	0	-
87	Arshad Khan	1993–2006	58	29	18	133	20	12.09	2823	27	1948	56	4–33	34.78	10	-
88	Ghulam Ali	1993–1995	3	3	0	53	38	17.66	-	-	-	-	-	-	0	-
89	Basit Ali	1993–1996	50	43	6	1265	127*	34.18	30	0	21	1	1–17	21.00	15	-
90	Aamer Nazir	1993–1995	9	3	2	13	9*	13.00	417	1	346	11	3–43	31.45	0	-
91	Nadeem Khan	1993–1995	2	1	0	2	2	2.00	96	0	81	0	-	-	0	-
92	Aamer Hanif	1993–1995	5	4	2	89	36*	44.50	130	0	122	4	3–36	30.50	0	-
93	Irfan Bhatti	1993	1	0	-	-	-	-	48	0	22	2	2–22	11.00	1	-
94	Ashfaq Ahmed	1994	3	0	-	-	-	-	102	2	84	0	-	-	0	-
95	Kabir Khan	1994–2000	10	5	4	10	5	10.00	371	4	303	12	2–23	25.25	1	-
96	Shakeel Ahmed	1995	2	2	0	61	36	30.50	-	-	-	-	-	-	0	-
97	Naeem Ashraf	1995	2	2	1	24	16	24.00	42	0	52	0	-	-	0	-
98	Zafar Iqbal	1995	8	6	0	48	18	8.00	198	2	137	3	2–37	45.66	1	-
99	Javed Qadeer	1995	1	1	0	12	12	12.00	-	-	-	-	-	-	1	-
100	Mahmood Hamid	1995	1	1	0	1	1	1.00	-	-	-	-	-	-	0	-
101	Mohammad Akram	1995–2000	23	9	7	14	7*	7.00	989	6	790	19	2–28	41.57	8	-
102	Saleem Elahi	1995–2004	48	47	4	1579	135	36.72	6	-	10	-	-	-	10	-
103	Saqlain Mushtaq	1995–2003	169	98	38	711	37*	11.85	8770	66	6275	288	5–20	21.78	40	-
104	Saeed Azad	1995–1996	4	4	0	65	31	16.25	-	-	-	-	-	-	2	-
105	Shadab Kabir	1996	3	3	0	0	0	0.00	-	-	-	-	-	-	1	-
106	Shahid Anwar	1996	1	1	0	37	37	37.00	-	-	-	-	-	-	0	-
107	Shahid Nazir	1996–2000	17	8	7	25	8	25.00	810	6	649	19	3–14	34.15	4	-
108	Azhar Mahmood	1996–2007	143	110	26	1521	67	18.10	6242	58	4813	123	6–18	39.13	37	-
109	Shahid Afridi^{1}	1996–2015	398	369	27	8064	124	23.57	17670	76	13632	395	7–12	34.51	127	-
110	Hasan Raza	1996–1999	16	13	0	242	77	18.61	-	-	-	-	-	-	1	-
111	Abdul Razzaq^{1}	1996–2013	265	228	57	5080	112	29.70	10941	107	8564	269	6–35	31.83	35	-
112	Azam Khan	1996–1998	6	5	0	116	72	23.20	-	-	-	-	-	-	2	-
113	Zahoor Elahi	1996–1997	14	14	1	297	86	22.84	-	-	-	-	-	-	2	-
114	Mohammad Wasim	1996–2000	25	25	2	543	76	23.60	-	-	-	-	-	-	9	-
115	Mohammad Zahid	1996–2002	11	4	2	15	7*	7.50	512	8	391	10	2–20	39.10	1	-
116	Mujahid Jamshed	1997	4	3	1	27	23	13.50	24	1	6	1	1–6	6.00	0	-
117	Ijaz Ahmed jnr	1997	2	1	1	3	3*	-	30	0	25	1	1–9	25.00	1	-
118	Mohammad Hussain	1997–1998	14	12	7	154	31*	30.80	672	2	547	13	4–33	42.07	5	-
119	Akhtar Sarfraz	1997–1998	4	4	0	66	25	16.50	-	-	-	-	-	-	0	-
120	Manzoor Akhtar	1997–1998	7	4	0	97	44	24.25	199	0	184	5	4–50	36.80	1	-
121	Fazl-e-Akbar	1998–2001	2	1	0	7	7	7.00	72	2	48	0	-	-	0	-
122	Mohammad Yousuf^{1, 2}	1998–2010	288	273	40	9720	141*	41.71	2	0	1	1	1–0	1.00	50	-
123	Shoaib Akhtar^{1}	1998–2007	163	84	40	394	43	8.95	7764	99	6169	247	6–16	24.97	20	-
124	Asif Mahmood	1998	2	2	0	14	14	7.00	-	-	-	-	-	-	0	-
125	Wajahatullah Wasti	1999–2000	15	15	0	349	84	23.26	55	0	69	3	3–36	23.00	5	-
126	Imran Nazir	1999–2007	79	79	2	1895	160	24.61	49	0	48	1	1–3	48.00	24	-
127	Shabbir Ahmed	1999–2005	32	11	5	10	2	1.66	1642	25	1192	33	3–32	36.12	10	-
128	Shoaib Malik	1999–2019	287	258	40	7534	143	34.55	7958	38	6192	158	4–19	39.12	98	-
129	Imran Abbas	2000	2	2	0	29	28	14.50	-	-	-	-	-	-	1	-
130	Yasir Arafat	2000–2014	11	8	3	74	27	14.80	414	2	373	4	1–28	93.25	2	-
131	Younis Khan	2000–2015	264	254	23	7240	144	31.34	284	1	288	3	1–3	96.00	134	-
132	Faisal Iqbal	2000–2007	18	16	2	314	100*	22.42	18	0	33	0	-	-	3	-
133	Irfan Fazil	2000	1	1	0	15	15	15.00	36	0	46	0	-	-	0	-
134	Atiq-uz-Zaman	2000	3	3	1	34	18	17.00	-	-	-	-	-	-	3	1
135	Imran Farhat	2001–2013	58	58	2	1719	107	30.69	116	2	110	6	3–10	18.33	14	-
136	Humayun Farhat	2001	5	3	0	60	39	20.00	-	-	-	-	-	-	4	3
137	Mohammad Sami	2001–2015	87	46	19	314	46	11.62	4284	42	3567	121	5–10	29.47	19	-
138	Kashif Raza	2001	1	1	1	2	2*	-	30	0	36	1	1–36	36.00	0	-
139	Taufeeq Umar	2001–2005	22	22	1	504	81*	24.00	72	0	85	1	1–49	85.00	9	-
140	Danish Kaneria	2001–2007	18	10	8	12	6*	6.00	854	11	683	15	3–31	45.53	2	-
141	Naved Latif	2001–2003	11	11	0	262	113	23.81	48	0	51	0	-	-	2	-
142	Misbah-ul-Haq	2002–2015	162	149	31	5122	96*	43.40	24	0	30	0	-	-	66	-
143	Kamran Akmal	2002–2017	157	138	14	3236	124	26.09	-	-	-	-	-	-	157	31
144	Mohammad Hafeez	2003–2021	218	216	15	6614	140*	32.90	7733	48	5400	139	4–41	38.84	85	-
145	Umar Gul	2003–2016	130	65	18	457	39	9.72	6064	68	5253	179	6–42	29.34	17	-
146	Rana Naved-ul-Hasan	2003–2007	74	51	18	524	33	15.87	3466	25	3221	110	6–27	29.28	16	-
147	Yasir Hameed	2003–2007	56	56	1	2028	127*	36.87	18	0	26	0	-	-	14	-
148	Faisal Athar	2003	1	1	0	9	9	9.00	-	-	-	-	-	-	0	-
149	Junaid Zia	2003	4	2	1	2	2*	2.00	145	1	127	3	3–21	42.33	0	-
150	Salman Butt	2004–2010	60	60	3	2185	136	38.33	69	0	90	0	-	-	17	-
151	Bazid Khan	2004	5	5	0	131	66	26.20	12	0	11	0	-	-	1	-
152	Iftikhar Anjum	2004–2008	62	34	19	234	32	15.60	2960	41	2430	77	5–30	31.55	10	-
153	Mohammad Khalil	2005	3	1	1	0	0*	-	144	0	144	5	2–55	28.80	2	-
154	Mohammad Asif^{1}	2005–2010	38	11	5	34	6	5.50	1941	26	997	46	3–28	33.13	5	-
155	Abdur Rehman	2006–2014	31	23	6	142	31	8.35	1624	12	1142	30	4–48	38.06	7	-
156	Fawad Alam	2007–2015	38	36	12	966	114*	40.25	398	0	377	5	1–8	75.40	10	-
157	Najaf Shah	2007	1	1	0	0	0	0.00	60	1	59	0	-	-	0	-
158	Sohail Tanvir	2007–2014	62	40	11	399	59	13.75	2949	24	2566	71	5–48	36.16	15	-
159	Sarfaraz Ahmed	2007–	117	91	22	2315	105	33.55	12	0	15	0	-	-	119	24
160	Nasir Jamshed	2008–2015	48	48	3	1418	112	31.51	-	-	-	-	-	-	13	-
161	Samiullah Khan	2008	2	0	-	-		-	120	0	115	0	-	-	0	-
162	Kamran Hussain	2008	2	1	1	28	28*	-	102	0	67	3	2–32	22.33	0	-
163	Khalid Latif	2008	5	5	0	147	64	29.40	0	-	-	-	-	-	1	-
164	Sohail Khan	2008–2016	13	6	1	25	7	5.00	666	4	597	19	5–55	31.42	3	-
165	Abdur Rauf	2008	4	0	-	-		-	214	1	212	8	3–24	26.50	2	-
166	Khurram Manzoor	2008	7	7	0	236	83	33.71	0	-	-	-	-	-	3	-
167	Rizwan Ahmed	2008	1	0	-	-		-	24	0	26	0	-	-	1	-
168	Wahab Riaz	2008–2020	91	66	15	740	54*	14.50	4327	20	4117	120	5–46	34.30	29	-
169	Naumanullah	2008	1	1	0	5	5	5.00	-	-	-	-	-	-	0	-
170	Mansoor Amjad	2008	1	1	0	5	5	5.00	48	1	44	1	1–44	44.00	0	-
171	Saeed Ajmal	2008–2015	113	70	24	324	33	7.04	6000	50	4182	184	5–24	22.72	25	-
172	Ahmed Shehzad	2009–2017	81	81	1	2605	124	32.56	115	0	140	2	1–22	70.00	28	-
173	Mohammad Amir	2009–2019	61	30	10	363	73*	18.15	3013	34	2400	81	5–30	29.62	8	-
174	Umar Akmal	2009–2019	121	110	17	3194	102*	34.34	-	-	-	-	-	-	77	13
175	Shahzaib Hasan	2010	3	3	0	100	50	33.33	-	-	-	-	-	-	0	-
176	Umar Amin	2010–2018	16	16	1	271	59	18.06	42	0	24	0	-	-	6	-
177	Asad Shafiq	2010–2017	60	58	4	1336	84	24.74	12	0	18	0	-	-	14	-
178	Mohammad Irfan	2010–2016	60	33	21	48	12	4.00	3109	31	2549	83	4–30	30.71	11	-
179	Zulqarnain Haider	2010	4	4	2	48	19*	24.00	-	-	-	-	-	-	1	-
180	Hammad Azam	2011	11	7	2	80	36	16.00	198	0	169	2	1–21	84.50	4	-
181	Junaid Khan	2011–2019	76	31	17	68	25	4.85	3601	33	3216	110	4–12	29.23	8	-
182	Mohammad Salman	2011	7	3	1	22	19*	11.00	-	-	-	-	-	-	8	2
183	Tanvir Ahmed	2011	2	1	0	18	18	18.00	60	0	83	2	1–38	41.50	1	-
184	Usman Salahuddin	2011	2	2	0	13	8	6.50	-	-	-	-	-	-	1	-
185	Azhar Ali	2011–2018	53	53	3	1845	102	36.90	258	0	260	4	2–26	65.00	8	-
186	Adnan Akmal	2011	5	4	1	62	27	20.66	-	-	-	-	-	-	3	-
187	Aizaz Cheema	2011	14	6	3	26	9*	8.66	658	3	593	23	4–43	25.78	2	-
188	Yasir Shah	2011–2019	25	13	6	127	32*	18.14	1293	1	1150	24	6–26	47.91	6	-
189	Rahat Ali	2012–2016	14	7	4	8	6*	2.66	679	1	658	18	3–40	36.55	1	-
190	Ehsan Adil	2013	6	4	1	27	15	9.00	225	0	223	4	1–31	55.75	0	-
191	Asad Ali	2013	4	2	0	13	11	6.50	180	6	115	2	1–22	57.50	0	-
192	Haris Sohail	2013–present	45	44	5	1749	130	44.84	642	0	613	11	3–45	55.72	17	-
193	Sohaib Maqsood	2013–2021	29	28	2	781	89*	30.03	54	0	42	1	1–16	42.00	10	-
194	Anwar Ali	2013–2016	22	16	5	321	43*	29.18	927	1	944	18	3–66	52.44	4	-
195	Bilawal Bhatti	2013–2015	10	7	1	89	39	14.83	409	4	439	6	3–37	73.16	2	-
196	Sharjeel Khan	2013–2017	25	25	0	812	152	32.48	-	-	-	-	-	-	6	-
197	Mohammad Talha	2014	3	1	0	0	0	0.00	122	1	146	4	2–22	36.50	0	-
198	Zulfiqar Babar	2014–2015	5	5	3	35	14*	17.50	294	1	246	4	2–52	61.50	0	-
199	Raza Hasan	2014	1	1	0	0	0	0.00	60	0	68	1	1–68	68.00	0	-
200	Mohammad Rizwan	2015–present	100	91	21	2921	131*	41.72	-	-	-	-	-	-	111	7
201	Saad Nasim	2015	3	3	1	99	77*	49.50	36	0	46	0	0	0	0	-
202	Sami Aslam	2015–2017	4	4	0	78	45	19.50	-	-	-	-	-	-	0	-
203	Babar Azam	2015–present	140	137	16	6501	158	53.72	-	-	-	-	-	-	62	-
204	Imad Wasim	2015-2019	55	40	17	986	63*	42.86	2403	8	1957	44	5–14	44.47	12	-
205	Aamer Yamin	2015	4	3	2	95	62	95.00	156	1	154	2	1–38	77.00	0	-
206	Bilal Asif	2015	3	3	0	40	38	13.33	132	1	96	6	5–25	19.20	2	-
207	Iftikhar Ahmed	2015–present	28	24	8	614	109*	38.37	796	4	742	16	5–40	46.37	17	-
208	Zafar Gohar	2015	1	1	0	15	15	15.00	60	0	54	2	2–54	27.00	4	-
209	Hasan Ali	2016–present	68	39	11	383	59	13.67	3286	18	3179	102	5–34	31.16	13	-
210	Mohammad Nawaz	2016–present	44	33	8	538	59	21.52	2097	4	1789	49	4–19	36.51	19	-
211	Shadab Khan	2017–present	70	44	11	855	86	25.90	3388	13	2960	85	4–27	34.82	19	-
212	Fakhar Zaman	2017–present	92	91	6	3861	210*	45.42	135	0	111	1	1-19	111.00	44	-
213	Faheem Ashraf	2017–present	42	28	3	350	73	14.00	1666	9	1447	32	5–22	45.21	11	-
214	Rumman Raees	2017	8	4	1	27	16	9.00	463	2	464	14	3–49	33.14	2	-
215	Imam-ul-Haq	2017–present	75	74	7	3152	151	47.04	-	-	-	-	-	-	16	-
216	Usman Shinwari	2017–2019	17	4	1	6	6	2.00	768	8	633	34	5–34	18.61	3	-
217	Asif Ali	2018–2022	21	16	1	382	52	25.46	5	0	9	0	-	-	6	-
218	Shaheen Afridi	2018–present	71	40	19	277	25	13.19	3607	29	3381	135	6–35	25.04	18	-
219	Hussain Talat	2019-present	10	8	2	211	62	35.16	60	0	77	0	-	-	1	-
220	Mohammad Abbas	2019	3	-	-	-	-	-	162	0	153	1	1–44	153.00	0	-
221	Shan Masood	2019–present	9	9	0	163	50	18.11	-	-	-	-	-	-	2	-
222	Mohammad Hasnain	2019–present	15	7	4	53	28	17.66	718	6	755	17	5–26	44.41	3	-
223	Abid Ali	2019	6	6	0	234	112	39.00	-	-	-	-	-	-	3	-
224	Saad Ali	2019	2	2	0	11	7	5.50	-	-	-	-	-	-	0	-
225	Haris Rauf	2020–present	54	21	8	105	35	8.07	2630	17	2566	97	5–18	26.45	12	-
226	Haider Ali	2020-2022	2	2	0	42	29	21.00	-	-	-	-	-	-	1	-
227	Muhammad Musa	2020–2021	2	1	1	9	9*	-	97	1	101	2	2–21	50.50	0	-
228	Khushdil Shah	2020–present	15	12	2	328	69	32.80	327	0	332	4	1–39	83.00	7	-
229	Danish Aziz	2021	2	2	0	12	9	6.00	30	0	27	0	-	-	0	-
230	Usman Qadir	2021	1	-	-	-	-	-	54	0	48	1	1–48	48.00	0	-
231	Saud Shakeel	2021–present	19	19	1	408	68	27.20	47	0	37	1	1–14	37.00	6	-
232	Mohammad Wasim	2022–present	25	12	3	93	17*	10.33	1238	7	1126	41	4–36	24.46	5	-
233	Zahid Mahmood	2022	4	2	1	9	9	9.00	216	0	220	4	2–59	55.00	0	-
234	Mohammad Haris	2022–present	6	5	1	30	17*	7.50	-	-	-	-	-	-	5	2
235	Shahnawaz Dahani	2022–present	2	2	2	4	4*	-	96	0	73	1	1–36	73.00	0	-
236	Salman Ali Agha	2022–present	47	39	8	1363	134	43.96	1000	0	976	19	4–32	51.36	21	0
237	Naseem Shah	2022–present	34	18	8	224	51	22.40	1701	7	1555	60	5–33	25.91	3	-
238	Abdullah Shafique	2022–present	27	27	2	737	113	29.48	-	-	-	-	-	-	14	-
239	Usama Mir	2023–present	12	6	0	40	20	6.66	636	0	634	15	4–43	42.26	7	-
240	Kamran Ghulam	2023–present	11	7	0	210	103	30.00	24	0	16	1	1-7	16.00	4	-
241	Ihsanullah	2023–present	1	-	-	-	-	-	48	0	60	0	-	-	0	-
242	Zaman Khan	2023–present	1	-	-	-	-	-	36	1	39	0	-	-	0	-
243	Irfan Khan Niazi	2024–present	9	6	0	48	22	8.00	30	0	51	3	3-51	17.00	5	-
244	Saim Ayub	2024–present	17	17	1	7571	113*	46.93	445	2	374	9	2-29	41.55	13	-
245	Aamir Jamal	2024–present	3	2	2	5	5*	-	96	2	85	3	2-19	28.33	0	-
246	Faisal Akram	2024–present	4	-	-	-	-	-	177	0	122	7	3-24	17.42	2	-
247	Haseebullah Khan	2024–present	2	2	0	0	0	0.00	-	-	-	-	-	-	3	-
248	Abrar Ahmed	2024–present	14	6	4	28	23*	14.00	786	8	582	28	4-27	20.78	4	-
249	Tayyab Tahir	2024–present	11	10	2	181	38	22.62	-	-	-	-	-	-	4	-
250	Sufiyan Muqeem	2024–present	4	3	2	15	13*	15.00	222	2	182	8	4-52	22.75	0	-
251	Akif Javed	2025–present	3	3	1	10	8	5.00	168	2	165	7	4-62	23.57	0	-
252	Mohammad Ali	2025–present	1	1	1	0	0*	-	60	0	53	1	1-53	53.00	0	-
253	Usman Khan	2025–present	2	2	0	51	39	25.50	-	-	-	-	-	-	0	-
254	Hassan Nawaz	2025–present	4	4	2	113	63*	56.50	-	-	-	-	-	-	2	-

Notes:

- ^{1} Abdul Razzaq, Inzamam-ul-Haq, Shahid Afridi, Shoaib Akhtar, Mohammad Yousuf and Mohammad Asif also played ODI cricket for ACC Asian XI. Only their records for Pakistan are given above.
- ^{2} Mohammad Yousuf was known as Yousuf Youhana until 2005.

== See also ==
- One Day International
- Pakistani cricket team
- List of Pakistan Test cricketers
- List of Pakistan Twenty20 International cricketers
