= Mohammad Naeem =

Mohammad Naeem or Muhammad Naeem may refer to:

== Cricket ==
- Mohammad Naeem (cricketer, born 1959), Pakistani cricketer for Income Tax Department and Lahore City
- Mohammad Naeem (cricketer, born 1986), Pakistani cricketer for Abbottabad and the Abbottabad Rhinos
- Mohammad Naeem (cricketer, born 1990), Pakistani cricketer for Abbottabad, the Abbottabad Falcons, the Abbottabad Rhinos, and Khyber Pakhtunkhwa
- Mohammad Naeem (cricketer, born 1999) Pakistani cricketer for Federally Administered Tribal Areas cricket team and Lahore Qalandars
- Mohammad Naeem (Lahore cricketer), Pakistani cricketer for Lahore and Lahore A

== Other people ==
- Muhammad Naeem (scholar), Pakistani Islamic scholar
- Muhammad Naeem (physicist), Pakistani nuclear physicist
- Muhammad Naeem (Pakistan Tehreek-e-Insaf politician), member of the Provincial Assembly of Khyber Pakhtunkhwa since February 2024
- Muhammad Naeem (Pakistan Muslim League (N) politician), member of the Provincial Assembly of Khyber Pakhtunkhwa from August 2018 till January 2023.

== See also ==
- Muhammad Naeem Khan (disambiguation)
