= West Indian cricket team in Pakistan in 1980–81 =

International cricket tour

West Indies cricket team in Pakistan
		(Cricket West Indies)
	Pakistan	West Indies
- Dates: 21 November 1980 – 4 January 1981
Captains	(Pakistan) Javed Miandad	(Cricket West Indies) Clive Lloyd

Test series
- Result: West Indies won the 4-match series 1–0
Most runs	Viv Richards (364); Larry Gomes (145)	Wasim Raja (246); Javed Miandad (230)
Most wickets	Iqbal Qasim (17); Mohammad Nazir (16); Imran Khan (10)	Colin Croft (17); Sylvester Clarke (14); Malcolm Marshall (13)
- Player of the series: Viv Richards (WI); Imran Khan (Pak)

One Day International series
- Results: West Indies won the 3-match series 3–0
Most runs	Zaheer Abbas (137)	Viv Richards (119)
Most wickets	Majid Khan (3)	Viv Richards (4)
- Player of the series: Viv Richards (WI)

The West Indies cricket team toured Pakistan in November to December 1980 and played a four-match Test series against the Pakistan national cricket team. West Indies won the Test series 1–0. West Indies were captained by Clive Lloyd and Pakistan by Javed Miandad. In addition, the teams played a three-match Limited Overs International (LOI) series which West Indies won 3–0.

== Test series summary ==
=== First Test ===
24–29 November 1980
(5-day match)
Scorecard

Pakistan	v	West Indies
369 (106.5 overs); Imran Khan 123 (199); MD Marshall 3/88 (21.5 overs)		297 (108.4 overs); IVA Richards 75 (144); Abdul Qadir 4/131 (40.4 overs)
156/7 (73 overs); Majid Khan 62* (131); IVA Richards 2/20 (11 overs)

Match drawn
Gaddafi Stadium, Lahore
Umpires: Khizer Hayat and Shakoor Rana
Player of the match: Imran Khan (PAK)

- Pakistan won the toss and elected to bat.
- 26 November was taken as a rest day.
- There was no play on the third day.
- Mansoor Akhtar (PAK) made his Test debut.

=== Second Test ===
8–12 December 1980
(5-day match)
Scorecard

West Indies	v	Pakistan
235 (77.3 overs); IVA Richards 72 (126); Mohammad Nazir 5/44 (22 overs)		176 (58.2 overs); Javed Miandad 50 (102); ST Clarke 3/28 (13 overs)
242 (89.2 overs); IVA Richards 67 (76); Iqbal Qasim 6/89 (32.2 overs)		145 (50.4 overs); Wasim Raja 38* (73); MD Marshall 4/25 (9.4 overs)

West Indies won by 156 runs
Iqbal Stadium, Faisalabad
Umpires: Amanullah Khan and Javed Akhtar
Player of the match: ST Clarke (WIN)

- West Indies won the toss and elected to bat.
- 10 December was taken as a rest day.
- The match was scheduled for five days but completed in four.
- R Nanan (WIN) made his Test debut.

=== Third Test ===
22–27 December 1980
(5-day match)
Scorecard

Pakistan	v	West Indies
128 (61.1 overs); Javed Miandad 60 (169); ST Clarke 4/27 (15 overs)		169 (85.1 overs); HA Gomes 61 (202); Iqbal Qasim 4/48 (34.1 overs)
204/9 (84 overs); Wasim Raja 77* (142); CEH Croft 3/50 (23 overs)

Match drawn
National Stadium, Karachi
Umpires: Javed Akhtar and Shakoor Rana
Player of the match: Wasim Raja (PAK)

- Pakistan won the toss and elected to bat.
- 25 December was taken as a rest day.
- There was no play on the first day.
- Ijaz Faqih (PAK) made his Test debut.

=== Fourth Test ===
30 December 1980–4 January 1981
(5-day match)
Scorecard

West Indies	v	Pakistan
249 (93.2 overs); IVA Richards 120* (263); Imran Khan 5/62 (22 overs)		166 (57.2 overs); Javed Miandad 57 (108); J Garner 4/38 (17.2 overs)
116/5 (42 overs); SFAF Bacchus 39 (81); Mohammad Nazir 3/35 (15 overs)

Match drawn
Ibn-e-Qasim Bagh Stadium, Multan
Umpires: Khizer Hayat and Mahboob Shah
Player of the match: IVA Richards (WIN)

- West Indies won the toss and elected to bat.
- 1 January was taken as a rest day.
- There was no play on the final day.

== One Day Internationals (ODIs) ==
West Indies won the Wills Series 3–0.

=== 1st ODI ===
21 November 1980
Scorecard

Pakistan; 127/9 (40 overs)	v	West Indies; 128/6 (40 overs)
Sadiq Mohammad 40 (79); AI Kallicharran 2/10 (3.3 overs)		SFAF Bacchus 36 (88); IVA Richards 36 (48); Mudassar Nazar 2/13 (4 overs)

West Indies won by 4 wickets
National Stadium, Karachi
Umpires: Javed Akhtar and Khalid Aziz
Player of the match: IVA Richards (WIN)

- West Indies won the toss and elected to field.
- Mansoor Akhtar, Mohammad Nazir and Taslim Arif (all PAK), and MR Pydanna (WIN) made their ODI debuts.

=== 2nd ODI ===
5 December 1980
Scorecard

Pakistan; 200/4 (40 overs)	v	West Indies; 201/3 (35.3 overs)
Zaheer Abbas 95* (98); IVA Richards 2/53 (8 overs)		IVA Richards 83 (94); Sikander Bakht 1/22 (4 overs)

West Indies won by 7 wickets
Jinnah Stadium, Sialkot
Umpires: Amanullah Khan and Shakoor Rana
Player of the match: IVA Richards (WIN)

- West Indies won the toss and elected to field.
- Ashraf Ali (PAK) made his ODI debut.

=== 3rd ODI ===
19 December 1980
Scorecard

West Indies; 170/8 (40 overs)	v	Pakistan; 163/6 (40 overs)
AI Kallicharran 50 (70); Wasim Raja 2/28 (8 overs)		Zaheer Abbas 42 (56); ST Clarke 2/25 (8 overs)

West Indies won by 7 runs
Gaddafi Stadium, Lahore
Umpires: Khizer Hayat and Mahboob Shah
Player of the match: ST Clarke (WIN)

- Pakistan won the toss and elected to field.
- Ijaz Faqih, Rashid Khan, Saleem Pervez and Tahir Naqqash (all PAK) made their ODI debuts.
