= Devon Cricket League =

ECB Premier League

- Logo of the Devon Cricket League
- Countries: England
- Administrator: Devon Cricket Foundation
- Format: Limited Overs
- First edition: 1972
- Tournament format: League
- Number of teams: 10 (Premier Division)
- Current champion: Paignton CC
- Most successful: Exmouth CC (11)
- Website: http://www.devoncricket.co.uk/

Location of the 2026 DCL Premier Division clubs

The Tolchards Devon Cricket League is the top level of competition for recreational club cricket in Devon, England, and the League Headquarters is in Little Torrington, Devon. The league was founded in 1972, and since 2000 it has been a designated ECB Premier League.

The league consists of a Premier division of 10 teams, and 14 feeder divisions lettered A-H, regionalised to East and West in the C-E divisions, and further regionalised to East, West and Central in the F-H divisions. Prior to the 2013 season, it was possible to obtain a draw in a game if the side batting second was not bowled out, but since then each innings in a match is limited to a number of overs (which varies depending on the division) and the team with the higher total from their allotted overs wins.

== Winners ==
- | Year | Champions |
  |---|---|
  | 1972 | Torquay |
  | 1973 | Plymstock |
  | 1974 | Torquay |
  | 1975 | Exeter |
  | 1976 | Torquay |
  | 1977 | Exeter |
  | 1978 | Torquay |
  | 1979 | Exeter |
  | 1980 | Exeter |
  | 1981 | Exmouth |
  | 1982 | Torquay |
  | 1983 | Barton |
  | 1984 | Barton |
  | 1985 | Paignton |
  | 1986 | Exmouth |
  | 1987 | Barton |
  | 1988 | Sidmouth |
  | 1989 | Barton |
  | 1990 | Exmouth |
  | 1991 | Exmouth |
- | Year | Champions |
  |---|---|
  | 1992 | Exmouth |
  | 1993 | Exmouth |
  | 1994 | Exmouth |
  | 1995 | Exmouth |
  | 1996 | Torquay |
  | 1997 | Torquay |
  | 1998 | Exmouth |
  | 1999 | Exmouth |
  | 2000 | Exeter |
  | 2001 | Sandford |
  | 2002 | Bovey Tracey |
  | 2003 | Sandford |
  | 2004 | Sandford |
  | 2005 | Paignton |
  | 2006 | Budleigh Salterton |
  | 2007 | North Devon |
  | 2008 | Sidmouth |
  | 2009 | Sidmouth |
  | 2010 | Sidmouth |
  | 2011 | North Devon |
- | Year | Champions |
  |---|---|
  | 2012 | Sidmouth |
  | 2013 | Exmouth |
  | 2014 | Sidmouth |
  | 2015 | Torquay |
  | 2016 | Sidmouth |
  | 2017 | Bovey Tracey |
  | 2018 | Sidmouth |
  | 2019 | Heathcoat |
  | 2020 | no competition |
  | 2021 | Heathcoat |
  | 2022 | Bradninch |
  | 2023 | Sandford |
  | 2024 | Bradninch & Kentisbeare |
  | 2025 | Bradninch & Kentisbeare |
  | 2026 | Paignton |

Source: Devon Cricket League

== Performance by season from 2000 ==
Key
| Gold | Champions |
| Blue | Left League |
| Red | Relegated |

Premier Division performance by season, from 2000
| Club | 2000 | 2001 | 2002 | 2003 | 2004 | 2005 | 2006 | 2007 | 2008 | 2009 | 2010 | 2011 | 2012 | 2013 | 2014 | 2015 | 2016 | 2017 | 2018 | 2019 | 2021 | 2022 | 2023 | 2024 | 2025 | 2026 |
|---|---|---|---|---|---|---|---|---|---|---|---|---|---|---|---|---|---|---|---|---|---|---|---|---|---|---|
| Abbotskerswell | | | | 9 | | | | | | | | | | | | | | | | | | | | | | |
| Barton | | 5 | 5 | 2 | 2 | 6 | 6 | 9 | | | | | | | | | | | | | | | | | | |
| Bovey Tracey | 3 | 3 | 1 | 10 | | | | | | 3 | 4 | 3 | 3 | 3 | 4 | 5 | 7 | 1 | 7 | 8 | 4 | 6 | 9 | 9 | | |
| Bradninch (Note: Bradninch entered into a merger after the 2022 season and became Bradninch and Kentisbeare.) | | | | | | | | | | 4 | 5 | 7 | 6 | 9 | | | | 2 | 9 | | | 1 | | | | |
| Bradninch and Kentisbeare | | | | | | | | | | | | | | | | | | | | | | | 2 | 1 | 1 | 7 |
| Braunton | | | | | | 9 | | | | | 10 | | | | | | | | | | | | | | | |
| Brixham | | | | | | | | | | | | | | | | | 10 | | | | | | | | | |
| Budleigh Salterton | | | | | 8 | 8 | 1 | 5 | 2 | 6 | 6 | 4 | 7 | 10 | | | | | | | | | | | | |
| Chudleigh | | | | | | | | 10 | | | | | | | | | | | | | | | | | | |
| Cornwood | 8 | 10 | 10 | | | | | | | | | | | 8 | 9 | | 9 | | | | 7 | 5 | 4 | 4 | 5 | 3 |
| Exeter | 1 | 6 | 2 | 3 | 5 | 5 | 5 | 2 | 5 | 7 | 9 | | | 6 | 5 | 6 | 2 | 6 | 2 | 5 | 9 | | | 3 | 4 | 5 |
| Exmouth | 2 | 7 | 9 | | 4 | 2 | 8 | 8 | 10 | | | 5 | 2 | 1 | 3 | 4 | 4 | 4 | 5 | 6 | 10 | | 5 | 5 | 3 | 4 |
| Hatherleigh | | | | | | | | | | | | | | | | | | | 10 | | 8 | 9 | | | | 8 |
| Heathcoat | | | | | | | | | | | | 8 | 9 | | 7 | 8 | 3 | 7 | 3 | 1 | 1 | 3 | 6 | 7 | 9 | |
| North Devon | 9 | | | 8 | 9 | | | 1 | 7 | 5 | 2 | 1 | 5 | 4 | 6 | 3 | 5 | 5 | 6 | 9 | | 4 | 10 | | 10 | |
| Paignton | 4 | 4 | 6 | 4 | 7 | 1 | 2 | 4 | 9 | | 7 | 10 | | | | 9 | | 10 | | 2 | 6 | 8 | 7 | 8 | 2 | 1 |
| Plymouth | | | | | | | | | 6 | 8 | 3 | 6 | 4 | 5 | 2 | 7 | 8 | 8 | 4 | 4 | 3 | 10 | | | 6 | 10 |
| Plympton | 6 | 8 | 4 | 6 | 6 | 4 | 7 | 3 | 3 | 2 | 8 | 9 | | | | 10 | | | | | | | 8 | 10 | | |
| Sandford | | 1 | 7 | 1 | 1 | 7 | 3 | 6 | 4 | 10 | | | 10 | | 10 | | | | 8 | 7 | 2 | 2 | 1 | 2 | 8 | 2 |
| Seaton | 10 | | | | | 10 | | | | | | | | | | | | | | | | | | | | |
| Sidmouth | 7 | 9 | 3 | 7 | 10 | | 9 | | 1 | 1 | 1 | 2 | 1 | 2 | 1 | 2 | 1 | 3 | 1 | 3 | 5 | 7 | 3 | 6 | 7 | 9 |
| Tavistock | | | | | | | 10 | | | | | | | | | | | | | | | | | | | 6 |
| Torquay | 5 | 2 | 8 | 5 | 3 | 3 | 4 | 7 | 8 | 9 | | | 8 | 7 | 8 | 1 | 6 | 9 | | 10 | | | | | | |
| References | | | | | | | | | | | | | | | | | | | | | | | | | | |

== International Cricketers ==
The following international cricketers have featured in the league:

=== England ===
- Bill Athey (Paignton)
- Sonny Baker (Torquay)
- Dom Bess(Exeter & Sidmouth)
- John Childs (Kingskerswell, Exeter & South Devon)
- Lewis Gregory (Plympton)
- Heather Knight (Plymstock)
- Mark Lathwell (Braunton)
- Craig Overton (North Devon)
- Jamie Overton (North Devon)
- Chris Read (Paignton)

=== Afghanistan ===
- Munir Ahmad (Bovey Tracey)

=== Australia ===
- Hilton Cartwright (Sidmouth)
- Marnus Labuschagne (Plymouth)
- Stuart MacGill (Heathcoat)
- Chris Rogers (Exeter & North Devon)

=== Ireland ===
- Max Sorrenson (South Devon)

=== New Zealand ===
- Adam Parore (Barton)
- Andrew Mathieson (Sidmouth)
- Roger Twose (Paignton & Torquay)

=== Pakistan ===
- Naveed Anjum (Barton)
- Aizaz Cheema (Cornwood)
- Mohammad Salman (Cornwood)
- Agha Zahid (Barton)

=== South Africa ===
- Kyle Abbott (Lewdown)
- Fanie De Villiers (Torquay)
- JP Duminy (Exmouth)
- Zubayr Hamza (Paignton)
- Vernon Philander (Budleigh Salterton)
- Jacques Rudolph (Paignton)
- Alfonso Thomas (Exeter)
- Kyle Verreyne (North Devon)
- Codi Yusuf (Sidmouth)

=== West Indies ===
- Omari Banks (Budleigh Salterton)
- Akeal Hosein (Exmouth)

=== Zimbabwe ===
- Jonathan Campbell (Sandford)
- Brian Chari (Bovey Tracey)
- Prince Masvaure (Sandford & Plymstock)
- Tarisai Musakanda (Budleigh Salterton & Barton)
- Tinotenda Mutombodzi (Hatherleigh & Plympton)
- Cephas Zhuwao (Barton)

== See also ==
- Devon County Cricket Club
