= Munir Hussain (commentator) =

Cricket commentator

Personal information
- Born: 29 November 1929; Amritsar, British India
- Died: 29 July 2013 (aged 83); Karachi, Pakistan
- Batting: Right-handed
- Bowling: Right-arm medium-fast
- Role: Bowler

Career statistics
Competition	First-class
Matches	1
Runs scored	12
Batting average	6.00
100s/50s	0/0
Top score	10
Balls bowled	174
Wickets	2
Bowling average	32.00
5 wickets in innings	0
10 wickets in match	0
Best bowling	2/64
Catches/stumpings	0/–
- Source: ESPNcricinfo, 26 August 2013

Munir Hussain (29 November 1929 – 29 July 2013) was a cricket commentator, administrator, and journalist from Pakistan who also played a first-class cricket match for Kalat in the 1969–70 season. He was the first to introduce Urdu commentary to cricket, and was the founder of the first Urdu cricket magazine, Akhbar-e-Watan. During the 1970s, Hussain commentated on the game for Pakistan Television (PTV) and Radio Pakistan, and wrote weekly columns on cricket for the Daily Jang for many years. He received many accolades for his work for cricket. Cricinfo writer Saad Shafqat described him as "a pioneering commentator, groundbreaking publisher, Karachi City Cricket Association (KCCA) mandarin, and sagacious elder presence in the nation's cricket circles". He also served as the president of the Karachi City Cricket Association (KCCA).

== Career ==
=== Cricket ===
Hussain was a good seamer with pace who played a lot of club cricket. He made his single first-class appearance, during the 1969–70 Quaid-i-Azam Trophy for Kalat against Quetta. Captaining his team, he scored 12 runs in the match. As a right-arm medium-fast bowler, Hussain took 2 wickets for 64 runs. Former Pakistan captain Imran Khan praised his "nip and direction" – once he bowled to Khan in the practice during the 1980s.

=== Commentator ===
The late 1960s, Radio Pakistan and PTV were broadcasting commentary only in English, which was not clearly understandable to most Pakistani cricket fans. Hussain was the first to put forward the idea of having Urdu commentary. He started commentating in Urdu during the 1969 Jang Gold Cup final, a match between National Sports and Clifton Gymkhana played at the Youth Centre, Nazimabad; in the match 13 Pakistani Test cricketers were playing. Hussain started commentating in Urdu commentary which distinguished him from his contemporaries. His distinguished Urdu commentary career spanned several decades, from the 1970s to the 2000s. For cricket coverage between the 1975 and 2003 World Cups, he travelled almost every Test cricket nation.

Munir Hussain (middle) during commentary

=== Administration and journalism ===
Hussain remained the president of the KCCA for two terms, and a member for many years. He also headed Pakistan Cricket Commentators Club (PCCC) in 2013. He was one of the founders of Jang Cricket Club. Cricket commentator, Chishty Mujahid, paid tribute to his services and said that he was a multifaceted personality as a cricket administrator, commentator, journalist, critic, analyst, organizer and much more.

Hussain's first passion was journalism; his earliest successful magazine was Filmasia, dedicated to the Indian and Pakistani film industries. Akhbar-e-Watan, a monthly Urdu cricket magazine, was edited by him from 1977 to 2010. Hussain continuously wrote weekly cricket columns for the Daily Jang, the Pakistan's largest and oldest circulation newspaper, for almost four decades.

== Awards ==
Hussain received the Best Urdu Commentator of the Decade Award for 1985–95. The Pakistan Broadcasting Corporation (PBC) presented him the Lifetime Achievement Award. On the tenth anniversary of the 1992 Cricket World Cup, won by Pakistan, he was also one of the recipients of the PCB's World Cup Legends Award.

Munir Hussain (left on bottom row), a pioneer of Urdu commentary in Pakistan

== Personal life ==
Hussain was born in November 1929 in Amritsar, Punjab, British Raj (now India). At a very young age, he moved to Karol Bagh – a neighbourhood of Delhi – where he spent the early years of his life. He migrated from Amritsar to Pakistan in 1947. Hussain was married and had four children, two daughters and two sons. Iqbal Munir, one of his sons, is a cricket photojournalist.

== Death ==
Hussain suffered from ulcers and underwent blood transfusion 60 times. Despite suffering from knee arthritis, that limited his mobility, his health was good. Before his death on 29 July 2013, Hussain watched the second Twenty20 International played between Pakistan and the West Indies. He died at the age of 83 from a heart attack in Karachi. His funeral was offered at Abu Bakar Siddiq mosque, DHA Phase-II, and he was buried at Gizri graveyard later that day. Hussain's granddaughter, Khizra, said at his death that "he was so loved that at the funeral we weren't given a chance to cry because people kept telling us stories about him and his generosity."

Former captains of the Pakistan cricket team Javed Miandad, Wasim Bari, Rashid Latif, cricket commentator Chishti Mujahid, former KCCA president Sirajul Islam Bukhari, and many other ex-Test cricketers attended his funeral. Miandad, offering his condolences, said that "Hussain had a fan following of his own and served the game with distinction." The interim chairman of the Pakistan Cricket Board, Najam Sethi, said that "he was an informed, easygoing and affable personality; his death will be widely mourned by the journalist and broadcast community as well as the cricketing fraternity across the country".
