= Irfan Bhatti =

Irfan Bhatti may refer to:

- Irfan Bhatti (cricketer, born 1964), Pakistani cricketer
- Irfan Bhatti (cricketer, born 1979), Kuwaiti cricketer

== See also ==
- Muhammad Irfan Saeed Bhatti (born 1992), Pakistani badminton player
