= Kalat cricket team =

Cricket team

Kalat was a first-class cricket team from the Pakistani city of Kalat in the north of Baluchistan province, about 150 kilometres south of Quetta. They had one season of first-class cricket in 1969–70, playing two matches in the Quaid-e-Azam Trophy.

== First-class matches ==
The Quaid-e-Azam Trophy was expanded from a 12-team tournament in 1968–69 to a 20-team tournament in 1969–70, and Kalat were one of several new teams to play at first-class level.

Their two matches took place in the space of 11 days in August 1969. Both were played at the Racecourse Ground in Quetta, and Kalat lost both by an innings. In the first match Kalat made 127 and 87 against Quetta, who declared at 402 for 8. In the second match Public Works Department declared at 524 for 4, and dismissed Kalat for 126 and 102.

Nineteen players appeared for Kalat in the two matches, and there were two captains. No batsman totalled 100 runs, and no bowler took five wickets. The highest score was 52 by Abdul Jabbar in the match against Quetta.

When the Quaid-e-Azam Trophy was reduced to an 18-team tournament for 1970–71, Kalat dropped out.

=== Players ===
Players who appeared for Kalat in the 1969–70 Quaid-e-Azam Trophy first-class matches are listed below:

Name	Notes	Reference
Abdul Jabbar	Played in both of the side's matches, scoring a half-century whilst opening the batting in the first match – the only Kalat batsman to score a half-century in either match. Other than these matches nothing is known about his career.	
Abdur Razzaq	Wicket-keeper who played in one match. Other than this, nothing is known about his career.	
Abdur Rehman	Played in one of the side's matches. Other than this, nothing is known about his career.	
Abdul Majeed	Played in Kalat's first match, going on to play two matches for Quetta in 1975/76. Other than these matches nothing is known about his career.	
Akbar Khan	Played in one match for Kalat, having previously played a single first-class match for Karachi University in 1967/68. Other than these matches nothing is known about his career.	
Amanullah	Played in one match for Kalat and seven for National Bank of Pakistan between 1969/70 and 1971/72.	
Anwar Ali	Played in one match. Other than this, nothing is known about his career.	
Faiz Aftab	Played in both of the side's matches. Other than these matches nothing is known about his career.	
Ghulam Saeed	Played in both of the side's matches. Other than these matches nothing is known about his career.	
Hakim Nasir	Played in Kalat's first match, taking four wickets in the only innings in which he bowled, making him Kalat's leading wicket-taker in first-class cricket. Played one other first-class match for Public Works Department in 1974/75. Other than these matches nothing is known about his career.	
Hasan Jamil	Made his first-class debut in Kalat's second match. Went on to play in 120 first-class and 43 List A matches, including in eight One Day Internationals for Pakistan	
Iftikhar Ahmed	Played in one match. Other than this, nothing is known about his career.	
Mairaj-ul-Hasan	Played in Kalat's first match, having previously played two first-class matches for Karachi University in 1967/68 and one for Karachi Schools in 1960/61. Played another first-class match for National Bank of Pakistan later in the 1969/70 season. Other than these matches nothing is known about his career.	
Munir Hussain	Captained Kalat in their first first-class match. Other than this he is not known to have played any other cricket. Was a notable commentator and journalist who pioneered cricket commentary in Urdu.	
Nasim Ahmed	Played in one match. Other than this, nothing is known about his career.	
Nasir Valika	Made his first-class debut in Kalat's second match. Went on to play 135 first-class matches, including 95 for United Bank Limited	
Sattar Bhagat	Captained the side in their second first-class match. Other than this match, nothing is known about his career.	
Shaukat Ali	Wicket-keeper who played in one match. Other than this, nothing is known about his career.	
Usman Bhagat	Played in one match. Other than this, nothing is known about his career.	

== Current status ==
Kalat currently compete in the annual sub-first-class Inter-District Senior Tournament against other teams from Baluchistan province. They play their home matches at various grounds in Quetta.

== Other sources ==
- Wisden Cricketers' Almanack 1970 to 1972
