= Aslam Qureshi =

Pakistani cricketer (1954–2020)

Personal information
- Born: 3 February 1954; Karachi, Pakistan
- Died: 6 June 2020 (aged 66)
- Source: Cricinfo, 15 April 2021

Aslam Qureshi (3 February 1954 – 6 June 2020) was a Pakistani cricketer. He played in 53 first-class and 18 List A matches for Habib Bank Limited and Karachi from 1969/70 to 1986/87, taking 120 first-class wickets. He also played in local leagues in England, and was later employed by the Pakistan Cricket Board (PCB) as a groundsman in Karachi. He died from COVID-19, aged 66.

== Career ==
Qureshi made his first-class debut at the age of 18 with Karachi Blues during the 1969–70 Quaid-e-Azam Trophy. He later played for Karachi Greens and joined Habib Bank in 1975, during the introduction of departmental cricket in Pakistan. In the 1986–87 season, he took 26 wickets at an average of 20.07.

Qureshi also played league cricket in the United Kingdom, where he recorded an 11-wicket haul in the BCCP Invitation Tournament and was a member of the Habib Bank team that won the 1983–84 Wills Cup.

After retiring from playing, Qureshi worked as an Assistant Chief Curator for the Pakistan Cricket Board at Gaddafi Stadium from 2009 to 2020.
