= Zahid (surname) =

Zahid is a surname. Notable people with the surname include:

- Agha Zahid (born 1953), Pakistani cricketer
- Daanish Zahid, convicted of the racially motivated murder of Kriss Donald in Scotland
- Mohammad Zahid (born 1976), Pakistani cricketer and coach
