= Usman Arshad =

Usman Arshad may refer to:

- Usman Arshad (Pakistani cricketer) (born 1983)
- Usman Arshad (English cricketer) (born 1993)
