= Muhammad Naeem Khan =

Muhammad Naeem Khan may refer to:

- Muhammad Naeem Khan (inspector general)
- Muhammad Naeem Noor Khan, alleged Al-Qaida operative
- Muhammad Naeem Khan (Swat politician)
- Muhammad Naeem Khan (diplomat), Pakistani diplomat

== See also ==
- Mohammad Naeem (disambiguation)
