= Waqar Ahmed =

Waqar Ahmed is the name of:

- Waqar Ahmed (cricketer, born 1947) (1947–2016), Pakistani cricketer
- Waqar Ahmed (cricketer, born 1980), Pakistani cricketer
- Waqar Ahmed (cricketer, born 2000), Pakistani cricketer
