= Farhan Asghar =

Pakistani cricketer (born 1980)

Personal information
- Born: 15 September 1980 (age 46); Lahore, Pakistan
- Batting: Right-handed
- Role: Wicket-keeper

Domestic team information
- Years: Team
- 1999–2000: Lahore City
- 2003–2006: Service Industries
- 2007: Sui Northern Gas Pipelines Ltd
- 2009–2010: Lahore Ravi
- 2012: Lahore Lions
- 2012: United Bank Ltd
- First-class debut: 2 January 2003 Service Industries v Lahore Blues
- Last First-class: 26 November 2012 Zarai Taraqiati Bank Ltd v United Bank Ltd
- List A debut: 10 April 1999 Lahore City v Habib Bank Ltd
- Last List A: 6 March 2012 Lahore Lions v Khan Research Laboratories

Career statistics
Competition	FC	LA
Matches	23	10
Runs scored	465	204
Batting average	16.60	25.50
100s/50s	0/2	0/2
Top score	75*	64
Catches/stumpings	63/3	7/5
- Source: CricketArchive (subscription required), 10 September 2020

Farhan Asghar (born 15 September 1980) is a Pakistani former cricketer. He played for Lahore Lions and Lahore Ravi. His highest score in List A cricket was 64. He played his last game in cricket against the Zarai Taraqiati Bank Limited. A wicket-keeper batsman, Asghar scored 410 not out during an inter-district cricket match for Lahore East Zone Whites against Lahore West Zone Whites in 2012. That score remains one of the 50 highest scores ever recorded in cricket.
