= Sohail Fazal =

Pakistani cricketer (born 1967)

Personal information
- Born: 11 November 1967 (age 59); Lahore, Pakistan
- Batting: Right-handed
- Bowling: Right-arm medium-fast

International information
- National side: Pakistan
- ODI debut (cap 72): 17 October 1989 v West Indies
- Last ODI: 20 October 1989 v India

Career statistics
Competition	ODI
Matches	2
Runs scored	56
Batting average	28.00
100s/50s	0/0
Top score	32
Balls bowled	6
Wickets	0
Bowling average	–
5 wickets in innings	–
10 wickets in match	–
Best bowling	–
Catches/stumpings	1/–
- Source: CricInfo, 3 May 2006

Sohail Fazal (born 11 November 1967) is a former Pakistani cricketer who played two One Day Internationals in 1989. He is one of the few Christians to have played for Pakistan. He was born at Lahore.
