= Manzoor Elahi =

Pakistani cricketer (born 1963)

Personal information
- Born: 15 April 1963 (age 63); Sahiwal, Punjab, Pakistan
- Batting: Right-handed
- Bowling: Right-arm fast-medium
- Relatives: Saleem Elahi (brother), Zahoor Elahi, (brother); Babar Manzoor (son)

International information
- National side: Pakistan (1984–1995)
- Test debut (cap 101): 24 October 1984 v India
- Last Test: 15 February 1995 v Zimbabwe
- ODI debut (cap 49): 12 October 1984 v India
- Last ODI: 26 February 1995 v Zimbabwe

Career statistics
Competition	Test	ODI
Matches	6	54
Runs scored	123	741
Batting average	15.37	22.45
100s/50s	0/1	0/1
Top score	52	50*
Balls bowled	444	1,743
Wickets	7	29
Bowling average	27.71	43.51
5 wickets in innings	0	0
10 wickets in match	0	0
Best bowling	2/38	3/22
Catches/stumpings	7/	21/–
- Source: CricInfo, 4 February 2017

Manzoor Elahi (Urdu:منظور الہی; born 15 April 1963) is a Pakistani cricket coach and former cricketer. Considered a hard-hitting batsman and a medium-pacer bowler, Elahi appeared in six Test matches and 54 One Day Internationals for Pakistan national cricket team from 1984 to 1995. Former Pakistan captain Imran Khan described him as "perhaps the hardest hitter of the cricket ball in the world."

== Early life and family ==
Manzoor Elahi was born in Sahiwal, Punjab in 1963. His two brothers, Zahoor Elahi and Saleem Elahi have also played for Pakistan.

His daughter, Sania Kamran, remained a member of the Provincial Assembly of the Punjab during the 2018-2023 tenure.

== Cricket career ==
Elahi's Test career was brief despite spanning more than a decade (1984–1995): he appeared in six matches, concluding with a game in which he registered two ducks and took two wickets; he was not selected for Tests thereafter.

His One Day International career was more eventful. He debuted in ODIs against India with a Player of the Match performance, contributing 36 runs and two wickets in a Pakistan victory. In December 1986, after India were dismissed for 144 in a 45-over match, Pakistan slipped to 65 for 6 before Elahi's 50 from 54 balls helped secure a three-wicket win. Later, in an ODI at Perth chasing 274 against Australia, Pakistan recovered from 129 for 6 through a partnership featuring Asif Mujtaba and Elahi; although Elahi was dismissed, Mujtaba completed the chase with one ball remaining.

== Post-retirement ==
After his retirement, Elahi has been involved in various roles, including as a senior cricketer, national selector, and trial selector. In 2002, he was appointed as the selector by Pakistan Cricket Board for selecting a team through trials for the Under-15 Asia Cup. Still in 2002, Elahi was named as the captain of Lahore City Cricket Association Blues.

In 2006, he played for Pakistan Senior Cricket Board team in a series against touring Indian cricket team.

In 2008, Pakistan Cricket Board appointed him as a selector in Multan region for Quaid-e-Azam Trophy. Two years later, in 2010, Elahi was appointed as a member of women's selection committee. In the same year, he also coached Lahore Eagles. For a brief period, he played for Porthill Park in the North Staffordshire and South Cheshire League.

In 2016, Elahi was selected as batting consultant for Pakistan national women's cricket team. During the same year, he shown his intention, by submitting an application, to become the head coach of Pakistan cricket team.

In 2019, Elahi served as the assistant coach for the Northern cricket team.
