= Saleem Elahi =

Pakistani cricketer (born 1976)

Personal information
- Full name: Saleem Elahi
- Born: 21 November 1976 (age 49); Sahiwal, Punjab, Pakistan
- Height: 5 ft 8 in (173 cm)
- Batting: Right-handed
- Bowling: Right-arm off-break
- Role: Batsman, Occasional wicket-keeper
- Relatives: Manzoor Elahi (brother), Zahoor Elahi (brother)

International information
- National side: Pakistan (1995–2004)
- Test debut (cap 136): 9 November 1995 v Australia
- Last Test: 2 January 2003 v South Africa
- ODI debut (cap 102): 29 September 1995 v Sri Lanka
- Last ODI: 14 January 2004 v New Zealand
- ODI shirt no.: 28

Domestic team information
- Years: Team
- 1994–1999: Lahore City
- 1996–1997: United Bank Ltd
- 1997–2011: Habib Bank Ltd
- 2001: Lahore Whites
- 2002: Lahore Blues
- 2004: Lahore

Career statistics
Competition	Test	ODI	FC	LA
Matches	13	48	111	141
Runs scored	436	1,579	5,508	6,277
Batting average	18.95	36.72	32.02	52.30
100s/50s	0/1	4/9	8/26	18/37
Top score	72	135	229	172
Balls bowled	–	6	42	12
Wickets	–	0	0	1
Bowling average	–	–	–	16.00
5 wickets in innings	–	–	–	0
10 wickets in match	–	–	–	0
Best bowling	–	–	–	1/6
Catches/stumpings	10/1	10/–	74/1	38/–
- Source: CricInfo, 25 July 2015

Saleem Elahi (Urdu: سلیم الہی; born 21 November 1976) is a former Pakistani cricketer who played 13 Test matches and 48 One Day Internationals between 1995 and 2004. He made 102 not out on his international debut, against Sri Lanka in September 1995, becoming the first player from Pakistan to score a century on ODI debut.

Considered a limited-overs specialist, Elahi averages 36.17 in ODIs and 52.30 in List A cricket. In 28 of the 48 ODIs that he had played as an opener he averaged 42, the best for a Pakistani opener. He had limited success in first-class cricket averaging just 32.

== Personal life ==
Born in 1976 in Sahiwal, Punjab, Pakistan, Elahi has two older brothers—Manzoor Elahi and Zahoor Elahi, both of whom represented the Pakistan cricket team.

== Cricket career ==
Despite not playing first-class cricket, Elahi was selected for the home series against Sri Lanka in 1995–96. In the first of the three-match One Day International series played at Gujranwala, he scored 102 not out off 133 balls thus becoming the first player from Pakistan to score a century on ODI debut; at age nineteen, he remains the youngest cricketer to do so as of July 2015. His man of the match-winning innings helped Pakistan secure a nine-wicket victory. He scored 77 runs in the next two games, thus accumulating 179 runs in the series. He was then selected to play in the Singer Champions Trophy in Sharjah the same year.

With continued success in both the tournaments, Elahi was picked up for the Test series against Australia in November 1995. Later, he made his first class cricket debut and played two matches against West Australia and South Australia. In two Tests, he managed to score 43 runs at an average of 10.75. Following that, he was intermittently selected and dropped from the side. Between his debut and 2002, Elahi played 13 Tests for Pakistan scoring 436 runs at an average of 18.95. Contrary to his success in ODIs, he managed just one half-century and six ducks, including a pair, in Test cricket. With the exception of a series in England in 2000, where he averaged 44.40, he failed to average more than 20 in any of the series'.

Towards the tail end of 2002, when Pakistan toured Zimbabwe and South Africa, he scored three centuries in four games. In one of those matches, in 2002 against South Africa, he made his highest score of 135. In the match, he shared a partnership of 257 runs with Abdul Razzaq for the second wicket to help Pakistan reach 335 runs. He was eventually selected for the 2003 World Cup. In four matches he scored 102 runs, crossing half-century once. Post World Cup, he represented Pakistan in two tournaments after which he was dropped from both the Test and ODI squads.

== Post-retirement ==
=== Cricket career ===
In 2016, he was included in the squad of Sagittarius Strikers and participated in the Masters Champions League. In the same year, he toured South Africa as part of a series arranged by Pakistan Veterans Cricket Association. He has also participated in Veterans Cricket Championship.

=== Coaching career ===
In July 2021, Pakistan Cricket Board appointed him as the coach of East Zone (B) Central Punjab, representing CCA Sahiwal.
