= Service Industries cricket team =

Cricket team

Service Industries (known until 1999 as Servis Industries) were a first-class cricket team in Pakistan sponsored by Service Industries Limited (SIL). They played 19 matches between 1975 and 2005, winning five matches, losing seven and drawing seven.

== As Servis Industries ==
Between 1975 and 1987 Servis Industries won five matches, lost two and drew three. In 1976–77, needing 398 to beat Lahore A in the Patron's Trophy, they scored the runs with one wicket to spare after being 258 for 8.

Their highest score was 120 by Imran Bucha on his first-class debut against Lahore B. He also took 1 for 19 and 5 for 40 in an innings victory. The best bowling figures were 6 for 55 by Naeem Taj against Hyderabad in 1986–87.

== As Service Industries ==
Between 2002 and 2005 Service Industries lost five matches and drew four. They played in the Quaid-e-Azam Trophy in 2002–03, and in the Patron's Trophy in 2005–06.

The only century was by Afaq Raheem, who scored 102 in the final match against Zarai Taraqiati Bank Limited in 2005–06. The best bowling figures were 6 for 37 by Asim Butt in the same match.

== List A matches ==
In 2002-03 and 2005-06 they also played nine List A matches, winning two and losing seven.

== Other matches ==
They played in various sub-first-class competitions as Servis Industries until the 1998–99 season, then from the 1999–2000 season as Service Industries. Victory in the finals of Grade II of the Patron's Trophy in 2001-02 and 2004-05 (each time over the Saga Sports team) led to their return to first-class competition in the subsequent season. They continue to play in Grade II of the Patron's Trophy.

== Notable players ==
- Shaiman Anwar
- Farhan Asghar
- Nadeem Ghauri
- Aftab Gul
- Aamer Hameed
- Nasir Javed
- Sohail Khan (cricketer, born 1967)
- Bilal Khilji
- Tahir Naqqash
- Arshad Pervez
- Rameez Raja
- Zaeem Raja
