= MRF Pace Foundation =

Cricket coaching foundation in India

Coordinates: 13.071834°N 80.238519°E

- Founded: 1987; 39 years ago
- Founder: MRF Limited
- Type: Private Foundation
- Purpose: Training fast bowlers (Cricket)
- Location: Chennai, India
- Region served: Worldwide
- Key people: Glenn McGrath (Director)
- Website: mrfpacefoundation.com

MRF Pace Foundation is a coaching clinic for training fast bowlers from all over the world. Based in Chennai, India, it was founded in 1987 by MRF Limited, with the help of former Australian pace spearhead Dennis Lillee. Through this program, young aspiring fast bowlers are trained in a facility located at the campus of Madras Christian College Higher Secondary School, Chetpet, Chennai.

Fast bowlers who have trained with the MRF Pace Foundation and gone on to represent the Indian Cricket Team include Vivek Razdan, Javagal Srinath, Irfan Pathan, Munaf Patel, Venkatesh Prasad, R. P. Singh, Zaheer Khan and S. Sreesanth. Besides Indian players, foreign players like Chaminda Vaas, Henry Olonga, Heath Streak, Mohammad Asif and Australian fast bowlers Glenn McGrath, Mitchell Johnson and Brett Lee have also trained at the Foundation. Sachin Tendulkar in his school days trained in the MRF Pace Foundation to become a fast bowler. Glenn McGrath was appointed director of the Foundation on 2 September 2012, replacing Dennis Lillee, who had held the post since its inception in 1987.
