= Ashfaq Ahmed (cricketer, born 1973) =

Pakistani cricketer (born 1973)

Personal information
- Born: 6 June 1973 (age 53); Lahore, Punjab, Pakistan
- Batting: Right-handed
- Bowling: Right-arm fast-medium

International information
- National side: Pakistan
- Only Test (cap 130): 9 December 1993 v Zimbabwe
- ODI debut (cap 94): 3 August 1994 v Sri Lanka
- Last ODI: 7 August 1994 v Sri Lanka

Career statistics
Competition	Test	ODI
Matches	1	3
Runs scored	1	–
Batting average	1.00	–
100s/50s	0/0	–
Top score	1*	–
Balls bowled	138	102
Wickets	2	0
Bowling average	26.50	–
5 wickets in innings	0	–
10 wickets in match	0	–
Best bowling	2/31	–
Catches/stumpings	0/–	0/–
- Source: ESPNCricinfo, 4 February 2017

Ashfaq Ahmed (born 6 June 1973) is a former Pakistani cricketer who played in one Test natch and three One Day Internationals (ODIs) in 1993. In his three ODI matches, he scored no runs, and took no wickets or catches.
