= Aamer Khurshid =

Pakistani cricketer (born 1967)

Personal information
- Born: 23 March 1967 (age 59); Karachi, Pakistan
- Source: ESPNcricinfo, 14 June 2016

Aamer Khurshid (born 23 March 1967) is a Pakistani former cricketer. He played first-class and List A matches for House Building Finance Corporation and Karachi Whites between 1987 and 1994.

== Career ==
From 1987 to 1994, Khurshid played for the House Building Finance Corporation in both first-class and List A cricket matches. He also represented Karachi Whites in List A cricket matches from 1989 to 1992, and in first-class cricket matches from 1991 to 1992.

Throughout his first-class career from 1987 to 1994, Khurshid participated in twenty-seven matches, in which he scored 1542 runs with an average of 33.52. He scored three centuries and seven half-centuries, and was credited with 10 catches.

In his List A career, spanning the same period from 1987 to 1994, he played in 38 matches. He scored 1074 runs with an average of 28.26, scoring one century and eight half-centuries. He also took six catches.
