= Iqbal Umar =

Pakistani cricketer (1941–2017)

Personal information
- Born: 1943; Karachi, British India
- Died: 17 April 2017 (aged 73–74); Karachi, Pakistan
- Batting: Right-handed
- Bowling: Slow led-arm orthodox

Domestic team information
- Years: Team
- 1964/65: Karachi University
- Source: Cricinfo, 12 August 2017

Iqbal Umar was a Pakistani first-class cricketer who played for Karachi University. He played only one first-class cricket match in 1964/65. He also served as a president of the Karachi Cotton Exchange.

He died in Karachi at the age of 74.
