= Nauman Shabbir =

Pakistani cricketer (1953–2013)

Personal information
- Born: 15 December 1953; Lahore, Pakistan
- Died: 22 October 2013 (aged 59)
- Source: ESPNcricinfo, 27 May 2016

Nauman Shabbir (15 December 1953 – 22 October 2013) was a Pakistani cricketer. He played first-class cricket for several domestic teams in Pakistan including Habib Bank Limited, Lahore and Punjab between 1971 and 1989.
