= Afaq Hussain =

Pakistani cricketer (1939–2002)

Personal information
- Born: 31 December 1939; Lucknow, United Provinces, British India
- Died: 25 February 2002 (aged 62); Karachi, Sindh, Pakistan
- Batting: Right-handed
- Bowling: Right-arm offbreak

International information
- National side: Pakistan
- Test debut (cap 38): 21 October 1961 v England
- Last Test: 4 December 1964 v Australia

Career statistics
Competition	Test	First-class
Matches	2	67
Runs scored	66	1,448
Batting average	–	24.54
100s/50s	0/0	1/5
Top score	35*	122*
Balls bowled	240	9,301
Wickets	1	214
Bowling average	106.00	19.42
5 wickets in innings	0	14
10 wickets in match	0	5
Best bowling	1/40	8/108
Catches/stumpings	2/–	52/–
- Source: ESPNcricinfo, 7 May 2014

Afaq Hussain (Urdu: آفاق حسین) (31 December 1939 – 25 February 2002) was a Pakistani cricketer who played in two Test matches from 1961 to 1964.

Afaq Hussain holds a unique record in Test cricket, having scored the most Test runs (66) without being dismissed. He scored 10* and 35* against England at Lahore in October 1961, and 8* and 13* against Australia at Melbourne in December 1964.

He toured England with the Pakistan team in 1962, and again in 1963 with the Pakistan Eaglets, and was part of the Pakistan team that toured Australia and New Zealand in 1964–65.

A "quickish" off-spin bowler and useful lower-order batsman, Hussain played for various first-class teams in Pakistan between 1957 and 1974. His best bowling figures were 8 for 108 for Karachi University against a combined Railways and Quetta side in 1960–61. His highest score was 122 not out for Pakistan International Airlines against Lahore B in 1969–70.
