= Nasir Valika =

Pakistani cricketer (born 1955)

Nasir Valika (born 10 July 1955) is a Pakistani former first-class cricketer who played 138 first-class cricket matches and 18 List A cricket matches between 1969-70 and 1983-84 for Kalat cricket team, Karachi cricket team, Sindh cricket team, and United Bank Limited cricket team.
