= Aamer Hameed =

Pakistani cricketer (born 1954)

Personal information
- Full name: Aamer Hameed
- Born: 18 October 1954 (age 72); Lahore, Punjab, Pakistan
- Batting: Right-handed
- Bowling: Right-arm fast-medium
- Role: Bowler

International information
- National side: Pakistan (1977–1978)
- ODI debut (cap 18): 23 December 1977 v England
- Last ODI: 13 January 1978 v England

Domestic team information
- Years: Team
- 1972/73–1973/74: Pakistan Universities
- 1974/75–1977/78: Punjab
- 1975/76–1977/78: Service Industries
- 1976/77: National Bank of Pakistan
- 1979: Oxford University

Career statistics
Competition	ODI	First-class	List A
Matches	2	54	12
Runs scored	–	923	38
Batting average	–	14.42	6.33
100s/50s	–	2/2	0/0
Top score	–	103	16
Balls bowled	88	7950	620
Wickets	1	115	14
Bowling average	38.00	38.69	25.71
5 wickets in innings	0	5	0
10 wickets in match	0	1	0
Best bowling	1/32	7/36	3/36
Catches/stumpings	1/–	18/–	7/–
- Source: ESPNCricinfo, 5 July 2026

Aamer Hameed (born 18 October 1954) is a Pakistani former cricketer. Hameed was a right-handed batsman who bowled right-arm fast-medium. He was born in Lahore, Punjab.

Hameed made his first-class debut for Pakistan Universities in the 1972/73 Pakistani season. He made his List A debut for Punjab in the 1974/75 season. He made his ODI debut for Pakistan against England at Sahiwal on 23 December 1977, and played his second and final ODI against England at Lahore on 13 January 1978.

During his domestic career, Hameed represented Pakistan Universities, Punjab, Service Industries, National Bank of Pakistan and Oxford University. He also played for Lahore and United Bank Limited.

Hameed made two one-day appearances for Pakistan against England in 1977/78, doing enough to win selection for Pakistan's tour of England later in 1978, although he did not play an international match on that tour. His only ODI wicket came on debut, when he dismissed England captain Mike Brearley at the Zafar Ali Stadium in Sahiwal.

After the 1978 tour of England, Hameed went to University College, Oxford, where he played for Oxford University and won his Oxford Blue in 1979. In all first-class cricket, he played 54 matches, scoring 923 runs with two centuries and taking 115 wickets, with best bowling figures of 7 for 36.
