= Zahoor Elahi =

Pakistani cricket coach and former cricketer (born 1971)

Personal information
- Full name: Zahoor Elahi
- Born: 1 March 1971 (age 55); Sahiwal, Punjab, Pakistan
- Batting: Right-handed
- Bowling: Right-arm medium
- Relatives: Saleem Elahi (brother), Manzoor Elahi (brother)

International information
- National side: Pakistan (1996–1997)
- Test debut (cap 143): 21 November 1996 v New Zealand
- Last Test: 28 November 1996 v New Zealand
- ODI debut (cap 113): 3 November 1996 v Zimbabwe
- Last ODI: 20 January 1997 v West Indies

Career statistics
Competition	Test	ODI
Matches	2	14
Runs scored	30	297
Batting average	10.00	22.84
100s/50s	0/0	0/3
Top score	22	86
Catches/stumpings	1/–	2/–
- Source: ESPNCricinfo, 4 February 2017

Zahoor Elahi (born 1 March 1971) is a Pakistani cricket coach and former cricketer. He played in two Test matches and 14 One Day Internationals between 1996 and 1997. His debut was against Zimbabwe.

== Early life and family ==
Elahi was born in 1971 in Sahiwal, Punjab. His brothers Manzoor and Saleem were also cricketers, who represented Pakistan in ODI and Test cricket.

== Career ==
Elahi represented Pakistan in international cricket in 1996 and 1997. In 2018, Elahi participated in the 19th National Veterans Cricket Championship. A year later, in 2019, he became the assistant coach of the Southern Punjab cricket team.
