= Zulqarnain (cricketer) =

Pakistani cricketer (born 1962)

Personal information
- Born: 25 May 1962 (age 64); Lahore, Punjab, Pakistan
- Batting: Right-handed
- Role: Wicket-keeper

International information
- National side: Pakistan (1985–1989)
- Test debut (cap 103): 23 February 1986 v Sri Lanka
- Last Test: 22 March 1986 v Sri Lanka
- ODI debut (cap 57): 4 December 1985 v West Indies
- Last ODI: 20 December 1989 v India

Career statistics
Competition	Test	ODI
Matches	3	16
Runs scored	24	18
Batting average	6.00	6.00
100s/50s	0/0	0/0
Top score	13	11*
Catches/stumpings	8/2	18/5
- Source: ESPNCricinfo, 4 February 2006

Zulqarnain (born 25 May 1962) is a former Pakistani cricketer who played in three Test matches and 16 One Day Internationals from 1986 to 1989.
