= Karachi University cricket team =

Cricket team

Karachi University cricket team, representing the University of Karachi in Karachi, played first-class cricket in Pakistan from 1958–59 to 1967–68, never losing a match.

Karachi University first played first-class cricket when the four-team Inter-Universities Championship was given first-class status in 1958-59 and 1959–60. They won in both years, beating Punjab University in the final each time.

Karachi University, along with Punjab University, then competed at first-class level in the Ayub Trophy in 1960–61, 1964–65, 1965–66, and 1967–68. They reached the semi-finals in 1960–61, when in their three matches Afaq Hussain took 29 wickets at 12.82.

Overall between 1959 and 1968 Karachi University played 13 first-class matches, winning 8 and drawing 5.

== Notable cricketers ==
- Afzaal Ahmed
- Asif Ahmed (cricketer, born 1942)
- Naushad Ali (cricketer)
- Afaq Hussain
- Tariq Javed
- Shahid Mahmood
- Nasim-ul-Ghani
- Abdur Raqib (cricketer)
- Mahboob Shah
- Iqbal Umar
