= Karachi City Cricket Association =

Karachi City Cricket Association administers cricket in Karachi, Sindh, Pakistan. he is affiliated to the Pakistan Cricket Board and has fielded a number of Karachi teams in Pakistan's domestic competitions.

== International efforts ==
In 2012, KCCA made efforts to bring international cricket in Pakistan by arranging a match between Pakistan and World XI cricket team but PCB has set to delay the match owing to the recent Pakistan cricket team tour of Sri Lanka

== See also ==
- List of Karachi first-class cricket teams
- Karachi Dolphins
- National Stadium, Karachi
