= Ghafoor Butt =

Pakistani cricketer and umpire (1936–2011)

Ghafoor Butt عبدالغفور بٹ
Personal information
- Born: 5 June 1936; Lahore, Pakistan
- Died: 23 April 2011 (aged 74); Karachi, Pakistan

Umpiring information
- ODIs umpired: 1 (1982)
- Source: Cricinfo, 17 May 2014

Ghafoor Butt (Urdu: عبدالغفور بٹ; 5 June 1936 – 23 April 2011) was a Pakistani cricketer and umpire. He mainly umpired at the first-class level in domestic fixtures. He also officiated in a One Day International in 1982.

== See also ==
- List of One Day International cricket umpires
