= Mohammad Naeem (cricketer, born 1959) =

Pakistani cricketer (born 1959)

Personal information
- Full name: Mohammad Naeem
- Born: 24 April 1959 (age 67); Lahore, Punjab, Pakistan
- Batting: Right-handed
- Role: Wicket-keeper

Domestic team information
- Years: Team
- 1978: Income Tax Department
- 1983–1985: Lahore City

Career statistics
Competition	FC	LA
Matches	8	2
Runs scored	288	21
Batting average	20.57	10.50
100s/50s	0/1	0/0
Top score	51	17
Catches/stumpings	16/2	0/0
- Source: CricketArchive, 15 February 2013

Mohammad Naeem (born 24 April 1959) is a former Pakistani cricketer. From Lahore, Mohammad made his first-class debut during the 1977–78 season, playing three matches for the Income Tax Department in the Patron's Trophy. He did not again play at first-class level until several seasons later, playing five matches for Lahore City during the 1982–83 season of the Quaid-e-Azam Trophy. A wicket-keeper, Mohammad usually batted in the lower order, but occasionally opened the batting, with his highest score (and only half-century) an innings of 51 runs against United Bank Limited as an opener. Although he did not play any further matches at first-class level, he did go on to play two List A matches for Lahore City—one each during the 1982–83 and 1985–86 seasons of the limited-overs Wills Cup.
