= Ijaz Faqih =

Pakistani cricketer

Ijaz Faqih اعجاز فقیہ
Personal information
- Born: March 24, 1956 (age 70); Karachi, Sindh, Pakistan
- Batting: Right-handed
- Bowling: Right-arm offbreak
- Role: All-rounder

International information
- National side: Pakistan
- Test debut (cap 87): 22 December 1980 v West Indies
- Last Test: 14 April 1988 v West Indies
- ODI debut (cap 33): 19 December 1980 v West Indies
- Last ODI: 30 March 1988 v West Indies

Career statistics
Competition	Test	ODI	FC
Matches	5	27	142
Runs scored	183	197	6058
Batting average	26.14	12.31	32.74
100s/50s	1/0	0/0	13/32
Top score	105	42*	183
Balls bowled	534	1116	31,415
Wickets	4	13	563
Bowling average	74.75	63.00	23.54
5 wickets in innings	0	0	41
10 wickets in match	0	n/a	9
Best bowling	1/38	4/43	8/51
Catches/stumpings	0/–	2/–	102/–
- Source: Cricinfo, 22 October 2022

Ijaz Faqih (Urdu: اعجاز فقیہ; born March 24, 1956, Karachi, Sindh) is a former Pakistani cricketer who played in five Tests and twenty-seven ODIs between 1980 and 1988.

== Biography ==
Born to a Konkani family who migrated to Pakistan from the west coast of Maharashtra, Faqih was a relative of the Pakistani Test cricketer Ebrahim Zainuddin "Ebbu" Ghazali: his mother-in-law was Ghazali's sister.

A middle-order batsman and off-spin bowler, Faqih played first-class cricket for a number of teams in Pakistan from 1973 to 1991. His highest score was 183 in the quarter-final of the Patron's Trophy in February 1978, when he captained Muslim Commercial Bank to a 609-run victory over Water and Power Development Authority; he also took eight wickets. His best bowling figures of 8 for 51 came seven months later in the BCCP Invitation Tournament, when he captained Muslim Commercial Bank to victory over Sind. In 1985–86 he set a Pakistan record by taking 107 wickets in a season; his teams Karachi Whites and Karachi won the Patron's Trophy and Quaid-e-Azam Trophy respectively.

The high point of Faqih's brief Test career was his century in the Fourth Test against India in the 1986–87 series in India. Flown in as a late replacement for Tauseef Ahmed, who was ill, Faqih scored 105 batting at number eight, adding 154 for the seventh wicket with Imran Khan. He won the player of the match award in the drawn match, but was replaced by Tauseef Ahmed for the fifth and final match of the series, which Pakistan won.
