= Usman Arshad (Pakistani cricketer) =

Pakistani cricketer (born 1983)

Personal information
- Born: 18 October 1983 (age 43); Sargodha, Pakistan
- Relatives: Arshad Pervez (father)
- Source: Cricinfo, 12 November 2015

Usman Arshad (born 18 October 1983) is a Pakistani first-class cricketer who played for Faisalabad cricket team.
