= Mohammad Naeem (Lahore cricketer) =

Pakistani cricketer

Personal information
- Full name: Chaudri Mohammad Naeem
- Born: unknown
- Batting: Right-handed
- Role: Batsman; occasional wicket-keeper

Domestic team information
- Years: Team
- 1978: Lahore
- 1983–1985: Lahore "A"

Career statistics
Competition	FC
Matches	7
Runs scored	149
Batting average	21.28
100s/50s	0/1
Top score	56
Catches/stumpings	6/3
- Source: CricketArchive, 15 February 2013

Chaudri Mohammad Naeem (date of birth unknown), best known as Mohammad Naeem, was a Pakistani cricketer. From Lahore, Mohammad made his first-class debut during the 1959–60 season, playing two matches for Lahore in the Quaid-e-Azam Trophy. During the following season, he played a further match for Lahore, in the Ayub Trophy. This was followed by a single appearance for a Punjab Governor's XI against Punjab University, in which he took three catches and effected three stumpings while playing as the team's wicket-keeper. For the 1961–62 season of the Quaid-e-Azam Trophy, Lahore was split into two separate teams—Lahore "A" and Lahore "B". Mohammad played three further first-class matches for Lahore "A" as a top-order batsman. His highest score (and only half-century) was an innings of 56 runs against Multan in November 1961, which included a partnership of 93 runs with Iftikhar Bukhtari (106) for the second wicket.
