= Shahid Mahboob =

Pakistani cricketer and coach (born 1962)

Personal information
- Full name: Shahid Mahboob
- Born: 25 August 1962 (age 64); Karachi, Sind, Pakistan
- Batting: Right-handed
- Bowling: Right-arm fast-medium
- Role: All-rounder

International information
- National side: Pakistan (1982–1989)
- Only Test (cap 115): 1 December 1989 v India
- ODI debut (cap 42): 31 December 1982 v India
- Last ODI: 7 December 1984 v New Zealand

Domestic team information
- Years: Team
- 1979/80–1981/82: Industrial Development Bank of Pakistan
- 1981/82–1992/93: Karachi
- 1982/83–1998/99: Allied Bank Limited
- 1983/84–1997/98: Karachi Whites
- 1983/84–1991/92: Pakistan Automobiles Corporation
- 1984/85–1998/99: Karachi Blues

Career statistics
Competition	Test	ODI	FC	LA
Matches	1	10	152	94
Runs scored	0	119	3,357	1056
Batting average	–	23.80	16.06	17.03
100s/50s	–	0/1	3/6	0/6
Top score	–	77	110	83
Balls bowled	294	540	30,498	4,266
Wickets	2	7	678	111
Bowling average	65.50	54.57	23.76	26.88
5 wickets in innings	0	0	40	1
10 wickets in match	0	0	8	0
Best bowling	2/131	1/23	8/62	5/52
Catches/stumpings	0/–	1/–	83/–	17/–
- Source: CricketArchive, 13 September 2012

Shahid Mahboob (Urdu: شاہد محبوب; born 25 August 1962) is a Pakistani cricket coach and former cricketer. An all-rounder, Mahboob was a right-handed batsman and right-arm fast-medium bowler. He was born in Karachi, Sind, and played one Test match and 10 One Day Internationals for Pakistan between 1982 and 1989, including five matches at the 1983 Cricket World Cup.

Mahboob received his early education from the St. Patrick's High School, Karachi. He first came to prominence in youth cricket. In the 1980–81 National Under-19 Championship, he took 7 for 69 for Karachi against Lahore, and he then took 11 wickets in three youth "Tests" against the touring Australians. He made his senior domestic debut for the Industrial Development Bank of Pakistan in the 1979–80 season and later represented Karachi, Allied Bank Limited, Pakistan Automobiles Corporation, Karachi Whites, Karachi Blues, Quetta, Rawalpindi and Islamabad.

He made his ODI debut against India at Gaddafi Stadium in December 1982, dismissing Krishnamachari Srikkanth. At the 1983 Cricket World Cup, he played one of the defining innings of his international career, scoring 77 against Sri Lanka at Headingley and sharing a sixth-wicket partnership of 144 with Imran Khan after Pakistan had slumped to 43 for 5. He played his last ODI against New Zealand in December 1984.

Mahboob's only Test appearance came against India at Lahore in December 1989. On a placid pitch he bowled 49 overs and took the wickets of Mohammad Azharuddin and Ravi Shastri, finishing with 2 for 131.

In domestic cricket, Mahboob became one of Pakistan's leading seam bowlers of the 1980s and 1990s. His first first-class century was 110 for Allied Bank Limited against Lahore City Cricket Association in the 1982–83 Quaid-e-Azam Trophy. He later captained Pakistan Automobiles Corporation, and in the 1983–84 Wills Cup he took 5 for 52 against House Building Finance Corporation, his only five-wicket haul in List A cricket. In the 1990–91 Quaid-e-Azam Trophy, playing for Karachi Whites, he took his career-best first-class figures of 8 for 62 against Peshawar at the National Stadium, Karachi.

After his playing career, Mahboob moved into coaching. In 2018, he was appointed head coach and development manager of the Qatar cricket team. In March 2022, the Pakistan Cricket Board appointed him head of its High Performance Centre in Karachi.
