= Mohinder Kumar =

Pakistani cricketer (born 1959)

Personal information
- Born: 11 June 1959 (age 67); Karachi, Pakistan
- Batting: Right-handed
- Bowling: Right-arm fast-medium

Domestic team information
- Years: Team
- 1976–1993: Karachi
- Source: ESPNcricinfo, 12 June 2016

Mohinder Kumar (born 11 June 1959) is a Pakistani cricketer. He played 65 first-class matches (between 1976/77 - 1993/94) and 53 List A matches (1980/81 - 1993/94) for Karachi and House Building Finance Corporation.
