= Irfan Bhatti (Pakistani cricketer) =

Pakistani cricketer (born 1964)

Cricket information
- Batting: Right-handed
- Bowling: Right-arm fast-medium

Career statistics
Competition	ODI
Matches	1
Runs scored	–
Batting average	–
100s/50s	–
Top score	–
Balls bowled	48
Wickets	2
Bowling average	11.00
5 wickets in innings	0
10 wickets in match	0
Best bowling	2/22
Catches/stumpings	1/–
- Source: CricInfo, 3 May 2006

Irfan Ahsan Kaleem Bhatti (born 28 September 1964) is a former Pakistani cricketer who played one One Day International in 1992. He was born at Peshawar.
