= Naeem Ahmed =

Pakistani cricketer (born 1952)

Personal information
- Full name: Naeem Ahmed Khan
- Born: 20 September 1952 (age 74); Karachi, Sindh, Pakistan
- Batting: Right-handed
- Bowling: Slow left-arm orthodox
- Role: All-rounder

International information
- National side: Pakistan (1978)
- Only ODI (cap 27): 26 May 1978 v England

Domestic team information
- Years: Team
- 1969/70: Karachi Blues
- 1970/71: Karachi Whites
- 1972/73–1974/75: Pakistan Universities
- 1974/75: National Bank of Pakistan
- 1975/76–1986/87: Pakistan International Airlines
- 1977/78: Punjab
- 1978/79: Sind

Career statistics
Competition	ODI	First-class	List A
Matches	1	129	42
Runs scored	0	3663	555
Batting average	–	28.84	27.75
100s/50s	0/0	3/19	0/2
Top score	0*	127	58*
Balls bowled	60	23878	1842
Wickets	0	359	55
Bowling average	–	27.73	22.94
5 wickets in innings	0	20	0
10 wickets in match	0	3	0
Best bowling	–	8/49	4/36
Catches/stumpings	1/–	61/–	15/–
- Source: ESPNCricinfo, 5 July 2026

Naeem Ahmed Khan (born 20 September 1952) is a Pakistani former cricketer. Ahmed was a right-handed batsman who bowled slow left-arm orthodox. He was born in Karachi, Sindh.

Ahmed made his first-class debut for Karachi Blues in the 1969/70 Pakistani season. He made his List A debut for Pakistan Universities in the 1974/75 season, and made his ODI debut for Pakistan against England at The Oval on 26 May 1978.

During his domestic career, Ahmed represented Karachi Blues, Karachi Whites, Pakistan Universities, National Bank of Pakistan, Pakistan International Airlines, Punjab and Sind. He also appeared for Karachi Greens, Pakistanis, Pakistan International Airlines A and United Bank Limited XI in representative cricket.

Ahmed was a successful all-rounder in Pakistan's domestic cricket. In 129 first-class matches, he scored 3,663 runs at an average of 28.84, including three centuries, and took 359 wickets at an average of 27.73. His best first-class figures were 8 wickets for 49 runs, while in List A cricket he took 55 wickets at an average of 22.94.

Ahmed played one ODI for Pakistan in 1978. After retiring as a player, he worked as a match referee in Pakistan's domestic cricket, officiating in 78 first-class matches, 53 List A matches, and 16 Twenty20 matches.
