= Khalid Aziz =

Pakistani cricket umpire (1937–2011)

Personal information
- Born: 15 July 1937; Lahore, Pakistan
- Died: 2 July 2011 (aged 73); Lahore, Pakistan

Umpiring information
- Tests umpired: 3 (1978–1992)
- ODIs umpired: 7 (1977–1993)
- Source: ESPNcricinfo, 9 July 2013

Khalid Aziz (15 July 1937 – 2 July 2011) was an international cricket umpire from Pakistan. Besides umpiring in domestic fixtures, he officiated in three Test matches from 1978 to 1992 and seven ODI games from 1977 to 1993.

During the West Indian tour of Pakistan in 1980–81, he protested publicly against the pressure officials put on umpires to make decisions in favour of the home team, and was sacked. He was not appointed to officiate at another first-class match until 1988.

He was the cousin of the Test cricketer Farooq Hamid.

== See also ==
- List of Test cricket umpires
- List of One Day International cricket umpires
