= Zahid Ahmed (Pakistani cricketer) =

Pakistani cricketer (born 1961)

Cricket information
- Batting: Right-handed
- Bowling: Slow left-arm orthodox

International information
- National side: Pakistan

Career statistics
Competition	ODI
Matches	2
Runs scored	3
Batting average	3.00
100s/50s	0/0
Top score	3*
Balls bowled	96
Wickets	3
Bowling average	20.33
5 wickets in innings	0
10 wickets in match	0
Best bowling	2/24
Catches/stumpings	0/–
- Source: CricInfo, 3 May 2006

Syed Zahid Ahmed Naqvi (born 15 November 1961) is a Pakistani former cricketer who played two One Day Internationals in 1987. He was born at Karachi.
