= Muslim Commercial Bank cricket team =

Cricket team

Muslim Commercial Bank were a Pakistani first-class cricket team sponsored by the Muslim Commercial Bank. They played in the Quaid-e-Azam Trophy and the Patron's Trophy between 1976–77 and 1988–89.

== Playing record ==
They played 95 first-class matches, with 25 wins, 40 losses, 29 draws and one tie. Their most successful seasons were 1977-78 and 1978–79, when they reached the final of the Patron's Trophy.

In 1977-78 they had a strong team, captained by Ijaz Faqih. In their first match they dismissed Sukkur for 32 and 52 and won by an innings and 322 runs, and in their third match they beat Water and Power Development Authority by 609 runs, the fourth-largest victory margin in terms of runs in the history of first-class cricket. In the final, however, Habib Bank Limited beat them by an innings. In the six matches Azmat Rana scored 721 runs at an average of 144.20, and Ijaz Faqih took 29 wickets at 19.62, as well as making 410 runs at 51.25.

In 1978–79, again captained by Faqih, they beat Habib Bank Limited in the semi-final, but lost on the first innings to National Bank of Pakistan in the final. Faqih again led the bowling, with 28 wickets at 23.85.

== Individual records ==
The highest score for Muslim Commercial Bank was 210 not out by Qasim Umar in 1982–83. He also hit the second-highest score, 203 not out, in the same season, when in seven matches for Muslim Commercial Bank in the Quaid-e-Azam Trophy he scored 1078 runs at 107.80 with five centuries.

The best innings bowling figures were 9 for 45 by Tahir Naqqash against Karachi in 1980–81. The best match bowling figures were 13 for 88 (6 for 41 and 7 for 47) by Ijaz Faqih against Peshawar in 1986–87. In 69 matches for Muslim Commercial Bank, Faqih scored 3391 runs at 33.24, and took 313 wickets at 24.52.

== Notable players ==
- Ijaz Faqih
- Muhammad Javed (cricketer)
- Tahir Naqqash
- Azmat Rana
- Qasim Umar
- Farrukh Zaman
