= Ijaz Ahmed (cricketer, born 1960) =

Pakistani cricketer (born 1960)

Personal information
- Full name: Ijaz Ahmed
- Born: 1 March 1960 (age 66); Sahiwal, Punjab, Pakistan
- Batting: Right-handed
- Bowling: Right-arm off break
- Role: Batsman

Domestic team information
- Years: Team
- 1976/77–1977/78: Pakistan Universities
- 1978/79: Punjab
- 1978/79: Income Tax Department
- 1979/80: Lahore City
- 1980/81–1982/83: Railways
- 1983/84–1984/85: Multan
- 1983/84–1986/87: House Building Finance Corporation

Career statistics
Competition	First-class	List A
Matches	75	18
Runs scored	3,797	312
Batting average	31.38	24.00
100s/50s	7/22	0/1
Top score	145	55
Balls bowled	252	–
Wickets	2	–
Bowling average	98.00	–
5 wickets in innings	0	–
10 wickets in match	0	–
Best bowling	1/38	–
Catches/stumpings	36/–	2/–
- Source: CricketArchive, 1 May 2026

Ijaz Ahmed (born 1 March 1960) is a Pakistani former cricketer. Ahmed was a right-handed batsman who bowled right-arm off break. He was born in Sahiwal, Punjab, and played domestic cricket in Pakistan for Pakistan Universities, Punjab, Income Tax Department, Lahore City, Railways, Multan and House Building Finance Corporation.

Ahmed made his first-class debut for Pakistan Universities against Railways in the quarter-final of the Pentangular Trophy in November 1976. In the 1977–78 Quaid-e-Azam Trophy, he made his highest first-class score, 145 against Railways at the Punjab University Ground, Lahore. In the same innings, he and Salman Qizilbash added 285 for the second wicket, helping Pakistan Universities to 458 and an eventual 245-run victory.

He later represented Punjab, Income Tax Department and Lahore City before establishing himself with Railways. His most successful Railways season came in 1981–82, when he scored 554 first-class runs at an average of 42.61, including two centuries. In List A cricket, his highest score was 55 against South Zone in the 1981–82 Wills Cup, when Railways made 341 for 5 and won by 219 runs.

Ahmed's most productive phase came after he moved to Multan and House Building Finance Corporation in the 1980s. In October 1984, captaining Multan against Bahawalpur in the 1984–85 BCCP Patron's Trophy, he carried the innings from 6 for 3 to 192 all out with an unbeaten 100 at Bahawal Stadium. Four days later, again for Multan, he made 117 against Lahore City Whites at the Multan Cricket Club Ground. Across the whole 1984–85 first-class season, he scored 710 runs at 44.37, with two centuries and five half-centuries.

Overall, Ahmed played 75 first-class matches, scoring 3,797 runs at a batting average of 31.38, with seven centuries and 22 half-centuries. His best returns came for Railways, for whom he scored 1,571 first-class runs, and for Multan, for whom he averaged 67.57 and scored three centuries in only five matches. In List A cricket, he played 18 matches and scored 312 runs, including one fifty. As an occasional off-spinner, he took only two first-class wickets.
