= Vivek Razdan =

Indian cricketer (born 1969)

Personal information
- Born: 25 August 1969 (age 57); New Delhi, India
- Nickname: Kaptaan
- Batting: Right-handed
- Bowling: Right-arm fast-medium

International information
- National side: India (1988–1990)
- Test debut (cap 188): 23 November 1989 v Pakistan
- Last Test: 9 December 1989 v Pakistan
- ODI debut (cap 73): 18 December 1989 v Pakistan
- Last ODI: 1 December 1990 v Sri Lanka

Career statistics
Competition	Test	ODI	FC	LA
Matches	2	3	29	18
Runs scored	6	23	700	103
Batting average	–	11.50	25.00	14.71
100s/50s	0/0	0/0	2/2	0/0
Top score	6*	18	101	29*
Balls bowled	240	84	4,060	757
Wickets	5	1	67	14
Bowling average	28.20	77.00	33.79	43.21
5 wickets in innings	1	0	2	0
10 wickets in match	0	0	0	0
Best bowling	5/79	1/37	5/67	3/32
Catches/stumpings	0/–	4/–	8/–	6/–
- Source: CricInfo, 4 February 2006

Vivek Razdan (born 25 August 1969) is a former Indian cricketer who played in two Test matches and three One Day Internationals in 1989 and 1990. After his retirement, he became a Delhi-based cricket coach and commentator.

== Early life ==
Razdan was born on August 25, 1969, in New Delhi into a Kashmiri Pandit family. He attended St. Columba's School, Delhi and completed his Class 12 in 1987 from the Sardar Patel Vidyalaya, Delhi.

== Career ==
In an extremely brief Test career, Vivek Razdan bowled in just two innings for India on the 1989 tour of Pakistan, taking five wickets in the second of them in a fairytale beginning but he faded away just as swiftly as he had risen into the limelight. Having cut his teeth at the MRF Pace Foundation, Razdan, then 20, was selected for the trip to Pakistan on the basis of just two first class appearances, one each in the Duleep and Irani Trophies. After making his Test debut in virtual anonymity in the second Test at Faisalabad, Razdan came roaring back, using some disconcerting movement off the wicket to claim 5–79 in the final Test at Sialkot and help India to a 74-run first innings lead.

That was to be the extent of Razdan's Test opportunities and although going on the subsequent trip to New Zealand, he was not played in the Tests and took just one first class wicket on the entire tour. His third and last ODI against Sri Lanka was at home in the 90–91 season during which, based in Madras as an MRF trainee, he represented Tamil Nadu in the Ranji Trophy. Razdan was a key member of the Delhi squad that lifted the Ranji Trophy in 1991–92, making two hundreds, against Services off only 96 balls, and in the quarterfinal against Bengal, besides a crucial 93 in the final against his former team, Tamil Nadu. Apart from his exploits with the bat, he also grabbed 23 wickets at 25.82. But he soon slipped backstage and into anonymity, with his first-class career coming to a full stop two seasons later. He has since taken up television commentary.
