= Shahid Saeed =

Pakistani cricketer (born 1966)

Personal information
- Born: 6 January 1966 (age 60); Lahore, Punjab, Pakistan
- Batting: Right-handed
- Bowling: Right-arm medium

International information
- National side: Pakistan (1989–1993)
- Only Test (cap 110): 15 November 1989 v India
- ODI debut (cap 70): 14 October 1989 v West Indies
- Last ODI: 12 January 1993 v Australia
- Source: CricketArchive, 4 February 2017

Shahid Saeed (Urdu: شاہد سعید) (born 6 January 1966) is a former Pakistani cricketer who played in one Test match and 10 One Day Internationals from 1989 to 1993. He is one of four cricketers who debuted in the same match along with Sachin Tendulkar and Waqar Younis. After his playing career he resided in England working for a company that makes rail parts.
