= Ali Zia =

Pakistani cricketer (1957–2024)

Ali Zia (Urdu: علی ضیاء; 20 March 1957 – 20 January 2024) was a Pakistani first-class cricketer who played from 1974–75 until 1992–93 for the Pakistan national cricket team.

== Career ==
Zia began his cricketing career in Lahore, playing for Crescent Cricket Club and representing Pakistan Under-19 in tours to Sri Lanka in 1974-75. He played for Islamia College and later Government College, scoring 205 against KE Medical College in 1975-76, which led to his inclusion in Pakistan Universities.

Zia made his first-class debut for Lahore A in the 1974-75 Patron’s Trophy, scoring 57 runs and sharing a 131-run partnership with Shafiq Ahmed. He played for several teams, including National Bank, United Bank, and Lahore City. His first-class career spanned from 1975-76 to 1992-93, during which he scored 8,579 runs at an average of 33.90, with 13 centuries and 49 fifties. He also took 241 wickets at an average of 28.40, with a best performance of 8-60.

Zia's achievements include scoring 176 for United Bank against PACO and scoring centuries in each innings against Railways in the 1987-88 Quaid-e-Azam Trophy. He was the first Pakistani player to score a double hundred and claim 10 wickets in the same match, which he accomplished for Lahore City Whites against Faisalabad in the 1985-86 Patron's Trophy.

After his playing career, Zia joined the Pakistan Cricket Board (PCB) as GM Domestic Cricket Operations and served as a match referee from 1994 to 2003. Ali, along with Mohsin Kamal, coached Bangladesh in the 2003 World Cup. He held various positions at the National Cricket Academy (NCA), including Senior Coach and Senior General Manager Academies. He contributed to the development of junior teams and the introduction of modern coaching techniques in Pakistan.

Zia was one of only two Level 4 Master Coaches in Pakistan and played a role in coaching and developing future players and coaches. He prepared coaching syllabi and conducted courses for future coaches until stepping down in 2019.

He died on 20 January 2024, at the age of 66.
