= Ashraf Ali (cricketer, born 1958) =

Pakistani cricketer (born 1958)

Personal information
- Born: 22 April 1958 (age 68); Lahore, Punjab, Pakistan
- Batting: Right-handed

International information
- National side: Pakistan
- Test debut (cap 93): 14 March 1982 v Sri Lanka
- Last Test: 16 December 1987 v England
- ODI debut (cap 32): 05 December 1980 v West Indies
- Last ODI: 13 October 1985 v Sri Lanka

Career statistics
| Competition | Test | ODI |
|---|---|---|
| Matches | 8 | 16 |
| Runs scored | 229 | 69 |
| Batting average | 45.79 | 17.25 |
| 100s/50s | 0/2 | 0/0 |
| Top score | 65 | 19* |
| Catches/stumpings | 17/5 | 17/3 |
- Source: , 4 February 2006

Ashraf Ali (born 22 April 1958) is a former Pakistani cricketer who played in eight Test matches and 16 One Day Internationals from 1980 to 1987. He was a wicketkeeper batsman. His brother Saadat Ali held the national record of maximum first-class runs in a calendar year for Lahore Gymkhana.

He holds the record for conceding most number of byes in an innings of One Day International (20).
