= Naved Anjum =

Pakistani cricketer (born 1963)

Personal information
- Born: 27 July 1963 (age 63); Lahore, Punjab, Pakistan
- Batting: Right-handed
- Bowling: Right-arm fast-medium

International information
- National side: Pakistan
- Test debut (cap 113): 23 November 1989 v India
- Last Test: 26 October 1990 v New Zealand
- ODI debut (cap 48): 26 March 1984 v England
- Last ODI: 30 December 1992 v New Zealand

Career statistics
Competition	Test	ODI
Matches	2	13
Runs scored	44	113
Batting average	14.66	12.55
100s/50s	0/0	0/0
Top score	22	30
Balls bowled	342	472
Wickets	4	8
Bowling average	40.50	43.00
5 wickets in innings	0	0
10 wickets in match	0	0
Best bowling	2/57	2/27
Catches/stumpings	0/–	0/–
- Source: CricInfo, 4 February 2006

Naved Anjum (born 27 July 1963) is a former Pakistani cricketer who played in two Test matches and 13 One Day Internationals from 1984 to 1992. After he left international cricket, he started a job with the Pakistan Cricket Board. He coached the United Arab Emirates at the 2001 ICC Trophy in Canada. He has also worked as the head coach of the Faisalabad regional team, the Faisalabad Wolves franchise, and Multan.
