= Arshad Pervez =

Pakistani cricketer (1953–2024)

Personal information
- Full name: Arshad Pervez
- Born: 1 October 1953; Sargodha, Punjab, Pakistan
- Died: 30 December 2024 (aged 71)
- Batting: Right-handed
- Bowling: Right-arm medium
- Role: Batter
- Relatives: Usman Arshad (son); Najam Pervez (brother)

International information
- National side: Pakistan (1978)
- ODI debut (cap 26): 13 January 1978 v England
- Last ODI: 26 May 1978 v England

Domestic team information
- Years: Team
- 1969/70–1992/93: Sargodha
- 1972/73–1974/75: Pakistan Universities
- 1975/76: Servis Industries
- 1975/76–1976/77: Punjab
- 1975/76–1991/92: Habib Bank Limited

Career statistics
Competition	ODI	First-class	List A
Matches	2	248	63
Runs scored	11	14,986	1,560
Batting average	5.50	39.85	28.88
100s/50s	0/0	39/65	2/9
Top score	8	251*	106*
Balls bowled	–	1327	122
Wickets	–	22	9
Bowling average	–	34.72	11.33
5 wickets in innings	–	0	0
10 wickets in match	–	0	0
Best bowling	–	3/37	3/11
Catches/stumpings	0/–	211/–	20/–
- Source: ESPNCricinfo, 5 July 2026

Arshad Pervez (1 October 1953 – 30 December 2024) was a Pakistani cricketer. Pervez was a right-handed batsman who bowled right-arm medium. He was born in Sargodha, Punjab. His brother Najam Pervez and son Usman Arshad also played first-class cricket.

Pervez made his first-class debut for Sargodha in the 1969/70 Pakistani season. He made his List A debut for Pakistan Universities in the 1974/75 season. He made his ODI debut for Pakistan against England at Lahore on 13 January 1978, and played his second and final ODI against England at The Oval on 26 May 1978.

During his domestic career, Pervez represented Sargodha, Pakistan Universities, Servis Industries, Punjab and Habib Bank Limited. He was one of the most prolific batters in Pakistan's domestic cricket, scoring 14,986 runs in 248 first-class matches at an average of 39.85, with 39 centuries. Most of those runs came for Habib Bank Limited, for whom he scored 10,288 first-class runs at an average of 42.16, including 27 centuries, while he also scored 2,742 first-class runs for Sargodha with six centuries.

Pervez also played two ODIs for Pakistan in 1978. After retiring as a player, he worked as a match referee in Pakistan's domestic cricket.

Pervez died on 30 December 2024, at the age of 71.
