= Saadat Ali =

Pakistani cricketer (born 1955)

Personal information
- Born: 3 February 1955 (age 71); Lahore, Punjab
- Batting: Right-handed
- Bowling: Right-arm off-break

International information
- National side: Pakistan
- ODI debut (cap 46): 9 March 1984 v England
- Last ODI: 7 December 1984 v New Zealand

Career statistics
Competition	ODI	FC	LA
Matches	8	148	56
Runs scored	184	10,122	1,576
Batting average	30.66	47.97	30.30
100s/50s	0/1	21/43	0/14
Top score	78*	277	83
Balls bowled	27	6,730	562
Wickets	2	82	17
Bowling average	14.50	37.78	30.41
5 wickets in innings	0	3	0
10 wickets in match	0	0	0
Best bowling	2/24	6/49	2/15
Catches/stumpings	1/–	136/–	19/–
- Source: CricInfo, 21 February 2021

Saadat Ali (born 3 February 1955) is a former Pakistani cricketer who played eight One Day Internationals for Pakistan in 1984. He has the distinction of being the first Pakistani to carry his bat in a one-day international when he was 78 not out.

== Career ==
Ali made his first-class debut in the 1973–74 season and his List A debut in 1974–75. Ali made his national team debut on 9 March 1984 at Gaddafi Stadium in Lahore against England. He played a further seven matches for his country, with the last of them held on 7 December 1984 at Multan Cricket Stadium against New Zealand. He continued to played first-class cricket until the 1988–89 season. He retired from List A cricket till 1989–90.

He held the national record for the most first-class runs in a season for House Building Finance Corporation and Lahore City Whites in 1983–84.

Ali became a match referee after his retirement. He has overseen 110 first-class, 63 List A, and 28 T20 matches, with the last of them held on 27 January 2015.

== Personal life ==
Saadat was born in Lahore, Punjab on 6 February 1955. His brother, Ashraf Ali, is also a former Pakistani cricketer who played in 8 Tests and 16 ODIs from 1980 to 1987.
