= Agha Zahid =

Personal information
- Born: 7 January 1953 (age 73); Lahore, Punjab, Pakistan
- Batting: Right-handed
- Bowling: Right-arm medium

International information
- National side: Pakistan
- Only Test (cap 69): 15 February 1975 v West Indies

Career statistics
Competition	Test	First-class
Matches	1	227
Runs scored	15	13,484
Batting average	7.50	36.84
100s/50s	0/0	29/66
Top score	14	183*
Balls bowled	–	7,621
Wickets	–	108
Bowling average	–	32.18
5 wickets in innings	–	1
10 wickets in match	–	0
Best bowling	–	5/24
Catches/stumpings	0/–	136/–
- Source: ESPNcricinfo, 19 June 2017

Agha Zahid (Urdu: آغا زاہد) (born 7 January 1953) is a Pakistani former cricketer who played in one Test match against West Indies in 1975. He had a long and distinguished domestic first-class career, scoring over 13,000 runs in 227 matches. He played for Devon County Cricket Club and Barton Cricket Club from 1982 to 1986. He also won promotion in first attempt followed by two consecutive first division championships in 1983–84.

== Biography ==
Born in Lahore, Zahid was raised by his mother after his father's death. He pursued cricket from a young age, often concealing his cricket kit to attend matches. He captained his school team and later led teams such as Government College, Lahore, Pakistan Universities, and Habib Bank.

Zahid started his cricket career at Cantt Gymkhana. He later captained Cantt Gymkhana.

Zahid made his first-class debut in the 1970-71 BCCP Trophy, scoring 86 and 74 for Punjab University. His performance continued with a century partnership with Nadeem Ahmed and a 112-run innings in the Quaid-e-Azam Trophy. He played for Devon in the Minor Counties Championship in England during the 1980s. His international career was limited to a single Test match, where he faced the West Indies' strong bowling attack.

As an opening batsman for Habib Bank, Zahid formed a successful partnership with Arshad 'Bata,' leading to multiple domestic titles. His first-class career spanned 227 matches, accumulating 13,484 runs with 29 centuries and 66 fifties.

After retiring from playing, Zahid worked as the Chief Curator for Pakistan Cricket Board (PCB), retiring from that role in 2020. Throughout his career, he has also coached Pakistan national under-19 cricket team, and Pakistan women's national cricket team. He coached U-15 in Lambord World Cup England in 1996 and also coached Pakistan U-19 against Australia home in 1997. He toured Bangladesh as Coach of Pakistan A where the team won SAARC Championship in 1997. Later on toured England with Pakistan A team. He also officiated as a domestic match referee from 1995 to 2000. He worked as chairman of Junior selection committee from 1999 to 2000.
