= House Building Finance Corporation cricket team =

Cricket team

House Building Finance Corporation were a Pakistani first-class cricket team sponsored by the House Building Finance Corporation (now the House Building Finance Company). They played in the Quaid-e-Azam Trophy and the Patron's Trophy between 1976–77 and 1993–94.

House Building Finance Corporation played 105 first-class matches, with 22 wins, 37 losses and 46 draws. Their most successful season was 1984–85, when they topped their group in the Quaid-e-Azam Trophy but lost their semi-final.

Their highest team total was 724 for 7 declared against Multan in 1976–77. Their highest individual score was 276 by Altaf Shah in the same innings. The best bowling figures were 9 for 38 by Saeed Anjum against Lahore City in 1980-81 (Lahore City declared with nine wickets down).

== See also ==
- List of House Building Finance Corporation cricketers
