= 2021–22 Pakistan Cup =

Cricket tournament

- Dates: 2 March – 1 April 2022
- Administrator: Pakistan Cricket Board
- Cricket format: List A
- Tournament format(s): Double round-robin and knockout
- Host: Pakistan
- Champions: Balochistan (1st title)
- Participants: 6
- Matches: 33
- Most runs: Haseebullah Khan (614)
- Most wickets: Khalid Usman (25)

The 2021–22 Pakistan Cup was a List A cricket competition that took place in Pakistan in March and April 2022. In February 2022, the Pakistan Cricket Board (PCB) confirmed the fixtures for the tournament. Khyber Pakhtunkhwa were the defending champions.

Following the conclusion of the group stage, Khyber Pakhtunkhwa, Balochistan, Sindh and Central Punjab all finished in the top four places to advance to the semi-finals of the tournament. In the first semi-final match, Khyber Pakhtunkhwa beat Central Punjab by six wickets to progress to the final. In the second semi-final, Balochistan beat Sindh by 13 runs to join Khyber Pakhtunkhwa in the tournament's final. In the final played at the Multan Cricket Stadium on 1 April 2022, Balochistan beat Khyber Pakhtunkhwa by eight wickets to win their first title.

== Squads ==
On 26 February 2022, the PCB confirmed all the squads for the tournament.

Balochistan	Central Punjab	Khyber Pakhtunkhwa	Northern	Sindh	Southern Punjab
Yasir Shah (c); Abdul Bangalzai; Akif Javed; Amad Butt; Asad Shafiq; Ayaz Tasawwar; Azeem Ghumman; Bismillah Khan (wk); Haseebullah Khan (wk); Imran Butt; Jalat Khan; Kashif Bhatti; Khurram Shahzad; Mohammad Saad; Mohammad Shahid; Taj Wali	Raza Ali Dar (c); Ahmed Shehzad; Awais Ali; Hussain Talat; Imran Dogar; Muhammad Akhlaq; Mohammad Ali; Mohammad Irfan; Nisar Ahmad; Qasim Akram; Rizwan Hussain; Saad Nasim; Umar Akmal; Usman Qadir; Wahab Riaz; Zafar Gohar	Iftikhar Ahmed (c); Aamer Azmat; Adil Amin; Arshad Iqbal; Asif Afridi; Fakhar Zaman; Imran Khan Jr; Imran Khan Sr; Irfanullah Shah; Khalid Usman; Mohammad Haris (wk); Mohammad Sarwar; Mohammad Wasim; Sahibzada Farhan; Sameen Gul; Waqar Ahmed	Shadab Khan (c); Aamer Jamal; Ali Imran; Asif Ali; Athar Mahmood; Haider Ali; Imad Wasim; Mehran Mumtaz; Mubasir Khan; Mohammad Huraira; Muhammad Musa; Nasir Nawaz; Rohail Nazir (wk); Salman Irshad; Umar Amin; Zaman Khan	Mir Hamza (c); Abrar Ahmed; Ahsan Ali; Ammad Alam; Asif Mehmood; Danish Aziz; Khurram Manzoor; Mohammad Asghar; Mohammad Hasan (wk); Mohammad Taha; Mohammad Umar; Omair Yousuf; Saad Khan; Shahnawaz Dahani; Sharjeel Khan; Sohail Khan	Agha Salman (c); Aamer Yamin; Abbas Afridi; Ali Majid; Azam Khan (wk); Faisal Akram; Hassan Khan; Khushdil Shah; Mohammad Imran; Rahat Ali; Sharoon Siraj; Sohaib Maqsood; Tayyab Tahir; Zain Abbas; Zeeshan Ashraf (wk); Zia-ul-Haq

== Group stage ==
=== Points table ===
Pos	Team	Pld	W	L	NR	Pts	NRR
1	Khyber Pakhtunkhwa	10	7	3	0	14	0.488
2	Balochistan	10	7	3	0	14	0.425
3	Sindh	10	6	4	0	12	0.198
4	Central Punjab	10	5	5	0	10	−0.146
5	Southern Punjab	10	4	6	0	8	−0.284
6	Northern	10	1	9	0	2	−0.826

Source: ESPN Cricinfo

Advanced to the semi-finals

=== Fixtures ===
2 March 2022
Scorecard

Northern; 275/8 (50 overs)	v	Balochistan; 276/8 (49.1 overs)
Umar Amin 116 (124); Akif Javed 5/60 (10 overs)		Bismillah Khan 84 (58); Imad Wasim 3/58 (10 overs)

Balochistan won by 2 wickets
House of Northern Cricket Ground, Islamabad
Umpires: Imran Javed and Saqib Khan

- Balochistan won the toss and elected to field.

2 March 2022
Scorecard

Southern Punjab; 159 (42 overs)	v	Sindh; 104/9 (23 overs)
Aamer Yamin 35* (35); Mir Hamza 4/25 (10 overs)		Danish Aziz 32* (35); Abbas Afridi 3/23 (5 overs)

Sindh won by 1 wicket (DLS method)
Multan Cricket Stadium, Multan
Umpires: Ghaffar Kazmi and Zameer Haider

- Sindh won the toss and elected to field.
- Sindh were set a revised target of 104 runs from 23 overs due to rain.

2 March 2022
Scorecard

Central Punjab; 215/9 (50 overs)	v	Khyber Pakhtunkhwa; 219/5 (42.2 overs)
Ahmed Shehzad 37 (60); Mehran Ibrahim 3/7 (4 overs)		Waqar Ahmed 68 (73); Usman Qadir 2/60 (10 overs)

Khyber Pakhtunkhwa won by 5 wickets
Iqbal Stadium, Faisalabad
Umpires: Nasir Hussain and Qaiser Waheed

- Khyber Pakhtunkhwa won the toss and elected to field.

4 March 2022
Scorecard

Balochistan; 209/9 (50 overs)	v	Sindh; 211/4 (41.3 overs)
Abdul Bangalzai 136* (155); Danish Aziz 2/20 (10 overs)		Sharjeel Khan 53 (64); Yasir Shah 2/40 (10 overs)

Sindh won by 6 wickets
Iqbal Stadium, Faisalabad
Umpires: Nasir Hussain and Qaiser Waheed

- Sindh won the toss and elected to field.
- Mohammad Shahid (Balochistan) made his List A debut.
- Abdul Bangalzai (Balochistan) scored his first century in List A cricket.

4 March 2022
Scorecard

Southern Punjab; 183 (41.4 overs)	v	Khyber Pakhtunkhwa; 187/4 (35.5 overs)
Sharoon Siraj 53 (51); Khalid Usman 3/41 (10 overs)		Adil Amin 57* (82); Rahat Ali 2/34 (9 overs)

Khyber Pakhtunkhwa won by 6 wickets
Multan Cricket Stadium, Multan
Umpires: Ghaffar Kazmi and Zameer Haider

- Khyber Pakhtunkhwa won the toss and elected to field.

4 March 2022
Scorecard

Central Punjab; 193/5 (25 overs)	v	Northern; 163 (24 overs)
Muhammad Akhlaq 70* (56); Muhammad Musa 2/32 (5 overs)		Umar Amin 34 (29); Wahab Riaz 4/23 (5 overs)

Central Punjab won by 30 runs
House of Northern Cricket Ground, Islamabad
Umpires: Imran Javed and Saqib Khan

- Northern won the toss and elected to field.
- The match was reduced to 25 overs per side due to rain.

6 March 2022
Scorecard

Khyber Pakhtunkhwa; 183 (40.1 overs)	v	Balochistan; 184/2 (36 overs)
Mohammad Haris 75 (71); Khurram Shahzad 3/17 (9 overs)		Imran Butt 79* (114); Sameen Gul 1/42 (8 overs)

Balochistan won by 8 wickets
Multan Cricket Stadium, Multan
Umpires: Ghaffar Kazmi and Zameer Haider

- Balochistan won the toss and elected to field.

6 March 2022
Scorecard

Sindh; 251 (44.4 overs)	v	Northern; 128/4 (23.2 overs)
Sharjeel Khan 118 (84); Asif Ali 2/10 (3 overs)		Umar Amin 41* (44); Shahnawaz Dahani 3/29 (5 overs)

Northern won by 2 runs (DLS method)
House of Northern Cricket Ground, Islamabad
Umpires: Imran Javed and Saqib Khan

- Northern won the toss and elected to field.
- Northern were set a revised target of 127 runs from 23.2 overs due to rain.

6 March 2022
Scorecard

Southern Punjab; 252 (48.3 overs)	v	Central Punjab; 256/6 (47.5 overs)
Agha Salman 70 (79); Wahab Riaz 3/33 (9.3 overs)		Hussain Talat 84* (74); Faisal Akram 4/35 (10 overs)

Central Punjab won by 4 wickets
Iqbal Stadium, Faisalabad
Umpires: Nasir Hussain and Qaiser Waheed

- Central Punjab won the toss and elected to field.
- Awais Ali (Central Punjab) and Faisal Akram (Southern Punjab) both made their List A debuts.

8 March 2022
Scorecard

Central Punjab; 179 (37.5 overs)	v	Balochistan; 180/2 (36.3 overs)
Qasim Akram 63 (76); Akif Javed 3/33 (5.5 overs)		Imran Butt 100* (128); Qasim Akram 1/14 (3 overs)

Balochistan won by 8 wickets
Multan Cricket Stadium, Multan
Umpires: Ghaffar Kazmi and Waleed Yaqub

- Balochistan won the toss and elected to field.

8 March 2022
Scorecard

Southern Punjab; 284 (48.1 overs)	v	Northern; 217 (43.2 overs)
Agha Salman 171 (134); Aamer Jamal 3/56 (10 overs)		Mubasir Khan 65 (62); Khushdil Shah 2/29 (7.2 overs)

Southern Punjab won by 67 runs
House of Northern Cricket Ground, Islamabad
Umpires: Imran Javed and Saqib Khan

- Northern won the toss and elected to field.

8 March 2022
Scorecard

Khyber Pakhtunkhwa; 220 (50 overs)	v	Sindh; 107 (31.5 overs)
Kamran Ghulam 47 (59); Danish Aziz 3/44 (10 overs)		Khurram Manzoor 26 (42); Khalid Usman 5/8 (5.5 overs)

Khyber Pakhtunkhwa won by 113 runs
Iqbal Stadium, Faisalabad
Umpires: Ahmed Khan and Nasir Hussain

- Sindh won the toss and elected to field.

10 March 2022
Scorecard

Balochistan; 320/4 (50 overs)	v	Southern Punjab; 215 (41 overs)
Haseebullah Khan 142 (134); Aamer Yamin 1/34 (5 overs)		Sharoon Siraj 62 (72); Yasir Shah 5/44 (10 overs)

Balochistan won by 105 runs
Iqbal Stadium, Faisalabad
Umpires: Nasir Hussain and Qaiser Waheed

- Southern Punjab won the toss and elected to field.

10 March 2022
Scorecard

Northern; 269/7 (50 overs)	v	Khyber Pakhtunkhwa; 273/5 (49.3 overs)
Umar Amin 124* (135); Mohammad Sarwar 3/24 (6 overs)		Mohammad Sarwar 119 (126); Imad Wasim 2/54 (10 overs)

Khyber Pakhtunkhwa won by 5 wickets
House of Northern Cricket Ground, Islamabad
Umpires: Imran Javed and Saqib Khan

- Khyber Pakhtunkhwa won the toss and elected to field.

10 March 2022
Scorecard

Central Punjab; 134 (29 overs)	v	Sindh; 136/7 (35.1 overs)
Umar Akmal 39 (36); Shahnawaz Dahani 3/22 (6 overs)		Khurram Manzoor 42 (67); Usman Qadir 3/37 (10 overs)

Sindh won by 3 wickets
Multan Cricket Stadium, Multan
Umpires: Aftab Gillani and Waleed Yaqub

- Sindh won the toss and elected to field.

13 March 2022
Scorecard

Balochistan; 126 (33.1 overs)	v	Sindh; 130/1 (19 overs)
Imran Butt 27 (38); Sohail Khan 5/21 (7.1 overs)		Sharjeel Khan 56* (48); Akif Javed 1/15 (4 overs)

Sindh won by 9 wickets
Multan Cricket Stadium, Multan
Umpires: Aftab Gillani and Waleed Yaqub

- Sindh won the toss and elected to field.

13 March 2022
Scorecard

Central Punjab; 366/7 (50 overs)	v	Southern Punjab; 367/8 (50 overs)
Ahmed Shehzad 158 (127); Agha Salman 2/22 (4 overs)		Tayyab Tahir 169 (140); Hussain Talat 3/37 (7 overs)

Southern Punjab won by 2 wickets
Iqbal Stadium, Faisalabad
Umpires: Qaiser Waheed and Saqib Khan

- Southern Punjab won the toss and elected to field.

13 March 2022
Scorecard

Khyber Pakhtunkhwa; 279/9 (50 overs)	v	Northern; 250 (47.5 overs)
Kamran Ghulam 118 (100); Aamer Jamal 2/27 (6 overs)		Imad Wasim 53 (71); Asif Afridi 3/42 (10 overs)

Khyber Pakhtunkhwa won by 29 runs
House of Northern Cricket Ground, Islamabad
Umpires: Imran Javed and Nasir Hussain

- Khyber Pakhtunkhwa won the toss and elected to bat.
- Yasir Khan (Khyber Pakhtunkhwa) made his List A debut.

16 March 2022
Scorecard

Southern Punjab; 191 (41.3 overs)	v	Balochistan; 192/2 (27.5 overs)
Sharoon Siraj 67 (88); Amad Butt 3/34 (7 overs)		Haseebullah Khan 106* (82); Aamer Yamin 1/30 (5 overs)

Balochistan won by 8 wickets
Multan Cricket Stadium, Multan
Umpires: Aftab Gillani and Waleed Yaqub

- Balochistan won the toss and elected to field.
- Muhammad Shehzad (Southern Punjab) made his List A debut.

16 March 2022
Scorecard

Sindh; 374/6 (50 overs)	v	Khyber Pakhtunkhwa; 345 (47 overs)
Sharjeel Khan 206 (136); Mohammad Wasim 2/72 (10 overs)		Mohammad Sarwar 89 (63); Shahnawaz Dahani 5/64 (9 overs)

Sindh won by 29 runs
House of Northern Cricket Ground, Islamabad
Umpires: Imran Javed and Nasir Hussain

- Khyber Pakhtunkhwa won the toss and elected to field.
- Sharjeel Khan (Sindh) scored his first double century in List A cricket.

16 March 2022
Scorecard

Central Punjab; 239 (50 overs)	v	Northern; 173 (39.2 overs)
Saad Nasim 84 (95); Aamer Jamal 3/16 (6 overs)		Imad Wasim 47 (74); Wahab Riaz 4/22 (5 overs)

Central Punjab won by 66 runs
Iqbal Stadium, Faisalabad
Umpires: Qaiser Waheed and Saqib Khan

- Northern won the toss and elected to field.
- Ali Asfand and Mohammad Zeeshan (Central Punjab) both made their List A debuts.

19 March 2022
Scorecard

Balochistan; 371/4 (50 overs)	v	Central Punjab; 295 (47.1 overs)
Imran Butt 129 (93); Hussain Talat 2/47 (7 overs)		Ahmed Shehzad 66 (54); Asad Shafiq 3/46 (6.1 overs)

Balochistan won by 76 runs
Iqbal Stadium, Faisalabad
Umpires: Ghaffar Kazmi and Zameer Haider

- Central Punjab won the toss and elected to field.

19 March 2022
Scorecard

Sindh; 221/5 (25 overs)	v	Northern; 213/9 (25 overs)
Saim Ayub 57 (34); Mubasir Khan 1/34 (5 overs)		Umar Amin 66 (38); Saim Ayub 2/25 (3 overs)

Sindh won by 8 runs
House of Northern Cricket Ground, Islamabad
Umpires: Imran Javed and Nasir Hussain

- Northern won the toss and elected to field.
- Saim Ayub (Sindh) and Shadab Majeed (Northern) both made their List A debuts.

19 March 2022
Scorecard

Khyber Pakhtunkhwa; 285/7 (50 overs)	v	Southern Punjab; 250 (44.1 overs)
Fakhar Zaman 95 (95); Zia-ul-Haq 4/65 (10 overs)		Agha Salman 56 (77); Khalid Usman 3/68 (10 overs)

Khyber Pakhtunkhwa won by 35 runs
Multan Cricket Stadium, Multan
Umpires: Aftab Gillani and Waleed Yaqub

- Southern Punjab won the toss and elected to field.
- Ali Majid (Southern Punjab) made his List A debut.

22 March 2022
Scorecard

Balochistan; 302/5 (50 overs)	v	Northern; 295/6 (50 overs)
Asad Shafiq 89 (66); Ali Imran 1/26 (5 overs)		Rohail Nazir 82 (87); Yasir Shah 3/57 (9 overs)

Balochistan won by 7 runs
Iqbal Stadium, Faisalabad
Umpires: Ghaffar Kazmi and Zameer Haider

- Northern won the toss and elected to field.

22 March 2022
Scorecard

Southern Punjab; 314/6 (50 overs)	v	Sindh; 268 (48.3 overs)
Hassan Khan 66* (48); Sohail Khan 3/71 (9 overs)		Saim Ayub 82 (82); Zia-ul-Haq 3/61 (9.3 overs)

Southern Punjab won by 46 runs
Multan Cricket Stadium, Multan
Umpires: Aftab Gillani and Waleed Yaqub

- Sindh won the toss and elected to field.

22 March 2022
Scorecard

Central Punjab; 268/9 (50 overs)	v	Khyber Pakhtunkhwa; 253 (50 overs)
Rizwan Hussain 104 (120); Mohammad Imran 4/54 (10 overs)		Mohammad Sarwar 43 (59); Qasim Akram 3/38 (7 overs)

Central Punjab won by 15 runs
House of Northern Cricket Ground, Islamabad
Umpires: Qaiser Waheed and Saqib Khan

- Khyber Pakhtunkhwa won the toss and elected to field.
- Muhammad Faizan (Central Punjab) made his List A debut.

25 March 2022
Scorecard

Central Punjab; 261 (48.2 overs)	v	Sindh; 184 (41.3 overs)
Ahmed Shehzad 68 (75); Mohammad Umar 3/43 (8 overs)		Sarfaraz Ahmed 59 (75); Zafar Gohar 3/38 (7.3 overs)

Central Punjab won by 77 runs
Iqbal Stadium, Faisalabad
Umpires: Ghaffar Kazmi and Zameer Haider

- Central Punjab won the toss and elected to bat.

25 March 2022
Scorecard

Northern; 220/6 (50 overs)	v	Southern Punjab; 224/7 (28.5 overs)
Mubasir Khan 59 (88); Sharoon Siraj 1/17 (3 overs)		Azam Khan 83 (39); Athar Mahmood 2/47 (7 overs)

Southern Punjab won by 3 wickets
Multan Cricket Stadium, Multan
Umpires: Aftab Gillani and Waleed Yaqub

- Southern Punjab won the toss and elected to field.

26 March 2022
Scorecard

Khyber Pakhtunkhwa; 283/8 (50 overs)	v	Balochistan; 234 (46.2 overs)
Adil Amin 92 (76); Taj Wali 2/44 (8 overs)		Ayaz Tasawwar 70 (80); Khalid Usman 3/31 (10 overs)

Khyber Pakhtunkhwa won by 49 runs
House of Northern Cricket Ground, Islamabad
Umpires: Qaiser Waheed and Saqib Khan

- Balochistan won the toss and elected to field.
- Maaz Khan and Muhammad Mohsin Khan (Khyber Pakhtunkhwa) both made their List A debuts.

== Finals ==
1st Semi-Final
28 March 2022
Scorecard

Central Punjab; 286/9 (50 overs)	v	Khyber Pakhtunkhwa; 290/4 (49 overs)
Qasim Akram 67 (63); Mohammad Imran 3/53 (10 overs)		Kamran Ghulam 109 (120); Rizwan Hussain 1/7 (1 over)

Khyber Pakhtunkhwa won by 6 wickets
Multan Cricket Stadium, Multan
Umpires: Nasir Hussain and Qaiser Waheed
Player of the match: Kamran Ghulam (Khyber Pakhtunkhwa)

- Central Punjab won the toss and elected to bat.

2nd Semi-Final
30 March 2022
Scorecard

Balochistan; 263 (47.5 overs)	v	Sindh; 250/9 (50 overs)
Haseebullah Khan 131 (114); Sohail Khan 3/37 (8.5 overs)		Omair Yousuf 60 (73); Kashif Bhatti 3/27 (10 overs)

Balochistan won by 13 runs
Multan Cricket Stadium, Multan
Umpires: Qaiser Waheed and Zameer Haider
Player of the match: Haseebullah Khan (Balochistan)

- Sindh won the toss and elected to field.

Final
1 April 2022
Scorecard

Khyber Pakhtunkhwa; 171 (46 overs)	v	Balochistan; 175/2 (31.2 overs)
Kamran Ghulam 70 (91); Yasir Shah 4/33 (10 overs)		Abdul Bangalzai 80* (77); Khalid Usman 2/47 (10 overs)

Balochistan won by 8 wickets
Multan Cricket Stadium, Multan
Umpires: Nasir Hussain and Zameer Haider
Player of the match: Yasir Shah (Balochistan)

- Balochistan won the toss and elected to field.
