= 2022–23 Pakistan Cup =

Cricket tournament

- Dates: 10 December 2022 – 3 January 2023
- Administrator: Pakistan Cricket Board
- Cricket format: List A
- Tournament format(s): Double round-robin and knockout
- Host: Pakistan
- Champions: Central Punjab (1st title)
- Participants: 6
- Matches: 33
- Player of the series: Amad Butt (BA) (365 runs and 19 wickets)
- Most runs: Tayyab Tahir (CP) (573 runs)
- Most wickets: Usama Mir (CP) (28 wickets)

The 2022–23 Pakistan Cup was a List A cricket competition that took place in Pakistan from 10 December 2022 to 3 January 2023. Balochistan were the defending champions.

Central Punjab won the competition, defeating Balochistan by 50 runs in the final.

== Venues ==
The group stage matches were hosted in three different venues in Karachi, with SBP Sports Complex hosting the semi-finals and the final.

Karachi
NBP Sports Complex	UBL Sports Complex	SBP Sports Complex
Capacity: 1,000	Capacity: 1,000	Capacity: 1,000
Matches: 10	Matches: 10	Matches: 13
2022–23 Pakistan Cup is located in Pakistan

== Points table ==
Pos	Team	Pld	W	L	NR	Pts	NRR
1	Central Punjab	10	7	3	0	14	0.604
2	Balochistan	10	6	4	0	12	0.669
3	Khyber Pakhtunkhwa	10	5	5	0	10	−0.859
4	Southern Punjab	10	4	6	0	8	0.190
5	Sindh	10	4	6	0	8	0.055
6	Northern	10	4	6	0	8	−0.752

Source: ESPNcricinfo

Advanced to the Semi-finals

== Fixtures ==
=== Group stage ===
==== Round 1 ====
10 December 2022
10:00
Scorecard

Northern; 356/2 (50 overs)	v	Balochistan; 244/7 (40 overs)
Mubasir Khan 118* (65); Amad Butt 1/64 (9 overs)		Hussain Talat 101* (74); Muhammad Musa 3/40 (7 overs)

Northern won by 54 runs (DLS method)
National Bank of Pakistan Sports Complex, Karachi
Umpires: Imran Javed and Imtiaz Iqbal
Player of the match: Mubasir Khan (Northern)

- Balochistan won the toss and elected to field.
- Balochistan were set a revised target of 299 in 40 overs.

10 December 2022
10:00
Scorecard

Sindh; 276 (48.3 overs)	v	Southern Punjab; 278/8 (48.5 overs)
Saim Ayub 100 (81); Usman Qadir 5/61 (10 overs)		Usman Salahuddin 89 (126); Sohail Khan 3/33 (9 overs)

Southern Punjab won by 2 wickets
United Bank Limited Sports Complex, Karachi
Umpires: Aaley Haider and Asif Yaqoob
Player of the match: Usman Qadir (Southern Punjab)

- Sindh won the toss and elected to bat.
- Arafat Minhas, Tahir Hussain (Southern Punjab) and Mohammad Suleman (Sindh) all made their List A debuts.

10 December 2022
10:00
Scorecard

Khyber Pakhtunkhwa; 143 (39 overs)	v	Central Punjab; 144/2 (27 overs)
Waqar Ahmed 61 (107); Zafar Gohar 3/30 (10 overs)		Muhammad Faizan 53 (49); Sajid Khan 2/38 (8 overs)

Central Punjab won by 8 wickets
State Bank of Pakistan Sports Complex, Karachi
Umpires: Mohammad Asif and Saqib Khan
Player of the match: Zafar Gohar (Central Punjab)

- Central Punjab won the toss and elected to field.
- Ihsanullah (Khyber Pakhtunkhwa) made his List A debut.

==== Round 2 ====
12 December 2022
10:00
Scorecard

Sindh; 288 (50 overs)	v	Balochistan; 254/5 (46 overs)
Saim Ayub 79 (75); Kashif Bhatti 3/37 (10 overs)		Ali Waqas 121* (122); Mir Hamza 2/39 (9 overs)

Balochistan won by 4 runs (DLS method)
State Bank of Pakistan Sports Complex, Karachi
Umpires: Ahsan Raza and Mohammad Sajid
Player of the match: Ali Waqas (Balochistan)

- Balochistan won the toss elected to field.
- Balochistan were set a revised target of 251 in 46 overs.

12 December 2022
10:00
Scorecard

Southern Punjab; 182 (44.3 overs)	v	Khyber Pakhtunkhwa; 184/4 (38.5 overs)
Arafat Minhas 32 (41); Ihsanullah 4/42 (9.3 overs)		Kamran Ghulam 98* (102); Usman Qadir 2/52 (9.5 overs)

Khyber Pakhtunkhwa won by 6 wickets
United Bank Limited Sports Complex, Karachi
Umpires: Aaley Haider and Saqib Khan
Player of the match: Ihsanullah (Khyber Pakhtunkhwa)

- Khyber Pakhtunkhwa won the toss and elected to field.
- Niaz Khan (Khyber Pakhtunkhwa) made his List A debut.

12 December 2022
10:00
Scorecard

Central Punjab; 359/7 (50 overs)	v	Northern; 286/9 (50 overs)
Tayyab Tahir 96 (91); Usman Shinwari 2/43 (9 overs)		Haider Ali 55 (62); Usama Mir 3/89 (10 overs)

Central Punjab won by 73 runs
National Bank of Pakistan Sports Complex, Karachi
Umpires: Asif Yaqoob and Mohammad Asif
Player of the match: Tayyab Tahir (Central Punjab)

- Northern won the toss and elected to field.

==== Round 3 ====
14 December 2022
10:00
Scorecard

Balochistan; 313/8 (50 overs)	v	Khyber Pakhtunkhwa; 314/4 (49 overs)
Bismillah Khan 88* (69); Ihsanullah 3/72 (10 overs)		Kamran Ghulam 123* (115); Khurram Shahzad 2/58 (9 overs)

Khyber Pakhtunkhwa won by 6 wickets
State Bank of Pakistan Sports Complex, Karachi
Umpires: Asif Yaqoob and Imtiaz Iqbal
Player of the match: Kamran Ghulam (Khyber Pakhtunkhwa)

- Khyber Pakhtunkhwa won the toss and elected to field.

14 December 2022
10:00
Scorecard

Sindh; 327/5 (50 overs)	v	Northern; 298 (47.4 overs)
Danish Aziz 82* (50); Mehran Mumtaz 2/43 (10 overs)		Umar Akmal 95 (58); Shahnawaz Dahani 3/60 (7 overs)

Sindh won by 29 runs
United Bank Limited Sports Complex, Karachi
Umpires: Ahsan Raza and Mohammad Asif
Player of the match: Danish Aziz (Sindh)

- Northern won the toss and elected to field.

14 December 2022
10:00
Scorecard

Central Punjab; 153 (34.2 overs)	v	Southern Punjab; 128 (34.4 overs)
Muhammad Faizan 40 (51); Arafat Minhas 3/30 (7.2 overs)		Hassan Khan 32 (31); Zafar Gohar 3/42 (9 overs)

Central Punjab won by 25 runs
National Bank of Pakistan Sports Complex, Karachi
Umpires: Mohammad Sajid and Saqib Khan
Player of the match: Aamer Yamin (Central Punjab)

- Central Punjab won the toss and elected to bat.

==== Round 4 ====
16 December 2022
10:00
Scorecard

Balochistan; 331/5 (50 overs)	v	Central Punjab; 303 (47 overs)
Hussain Talat 141* (122); Qasim Akram 2/52 (9 overs)		Muhammad Faizan 94 (72); Mohammad Junaid 3/47 (10 overs)

Balochistan won by 28 runs
United Bank Limited Sports Complex, Karachi
Umpires: Aaley Haider and Saqib Khan
Player of the match: Hussain Talat (Balochistan)

- Central Punjab won the toss and elected to field.

16 December 2022
10:00
Scorecard

Northern; 215 (49.3 overs)	v	Southern Punjab; 205 (48.2 overs)
Umar Akmal 49 (46); Hassan Khan 4/31 (10 overs)		Usman Salahuddin 81* (126); Athar Mahmood 4/46 (9 overs)

Northern won by 10 runs
State Bank of Pakistan Sports Complex, Karachi
Umpires: Imran Javed and Mohammad Sajid
Player of the match: Athar Mahmood (Northern)

- Southern Punjab won the toss and elected to field.

16 December 2022
10:00
Scorecard

Khyber Pakhtunkhwa; 40 (20 overs)	v	Sindh; 41/6 (13.4 overs)
Ihsanullah 10 (4); Shahnawaz Dahani 6/19 (10 overs)		Saim Ayub 14 (11); Sajid Khan 3/14 (6.4 overs)

Sindh won by 4 wickets
National Bank of Pakistan Sports Complex, Karachi
Umpires: Imtiaz Iqbal and Mohammad Asif
Player of the match: Shahnawaz Dahani (Sindh)

- Sindh won the toss and elected to field.

==== Round 5 ====
18 December 2022
10:00
Scorecard

Balochistan; 278/7 (50 overs)	v	Southern Punjab; 189 (35.2 overs)
Amad Butt 104* (91); Sharoon Siraj 4/48 (9 overs)		Zain Abbas 51 (64); Mohammad Junaid 4/54 (9 overs)

Balochistan won by 89 runs
State Bank of Pakistan Sports Complex, Karachi
Umpires: Imtiaz Iqbal and Nasir Hussain
Player of the match: Mohammad Junaid (Balochistan)

- Southern Punjab won the toss and elected to field.

18 December 2022
10:00
Scorecard

Northern; 305/9 (50 overs)	v	Khyber Pakhtunkhwa; 237 (43.5 overs)
Umar Amin 112 (104); Mohammad Amir Khan 3/72 (9 overs)		Kamran Ghulam 92 (103); Kashif Ali 3/18 (6.5 overs)

Northern won by 68 runs
National Bank of Pakistan Sports Complex, Karachi
Umpires: Aaley Haider and Mohammad Sajid
Player of the match: Umar Amin (Northern)

- Khyber Pakhtunkhwa won the toss elected to field.
- Kashif Ali made his List A debut.

18 December 2022
10:00
Scorecard

Sindh; 347/8 (50 overs)	v	Central Punjab; 348/5 (45.2 overs)
Sharjeel Khan 114 (80); Muhammad Faizan 3/54 (7 overs)		Tayyab Tahir 139 (109); Asif Mehmood 2/55 (9 overs)

Central Punjab won by 5 wickets
United Bank Limited Sports Complex, Karachi
Umpires: Imran Javed and Mohammad Asif
Player of the match: Tayyab Tahir (Central Punjab)

- Central Punjab won the toss and elected to field.

==== Round 6 ====
21 December 2022
10:00
Scorecard

Balochistan; 253 (47.5 overs)	v	Sindh; 254/4 (41.1 overs)
Haseebullah Khan 107 (110); Danish Aziz 3/50 (8.5 overs)		Saim Ayub 102 (99); Kashif Bhatti 3/38 (10 overs)

Sindh won by 6 wickets
National Bank of Pakistan Sports Complex, Karachi
Umpires: Mohammad Sajid and Tariq Rasheed
Player of the match: Saim Ayub (Sindh)

- Sindh won the toss and elected to field.
- Arish Ali Khan made his List A debut.

21 December 2022
10:00
Scorecard

Central Punjab; 274/8 (50 overs)	v	Southern Punjab; 177 (38 overs)
Zain Abbas 69 (80); Aamer Yamin 4/54 (10 overs)		Ahmed Shehzad 54 (56); Arafat Minhas 4/34 (9 overs)

Southern Punjab won by 97 runs
United Bank Limited Sports Complex, Karachi
Umpires: Imtiaz Iqbal and Shozab Raza
Player of the match: Hassan Khan (Southern Punjab)

- Central Punjab won the toss and elected to field.
- Mohammad Umair made his List A debut.

21 December 2022
10:00
Scorecard

Northern; 351/4 (50 overs)	v	Khyber Pakhtunkhwa; 268 (46.2 overs)
Kamran Ghulam 118* (92); Mehran Mumtaz 2/45 (10 overs)		Umar Akmal 76 (71); Ihsanullah 5/49 (8.2 overs)

Khyber Pakhtunkhwa won by 83 runs
State Bank of Pakistan Sports Complex, Karachi
Umpires: Aaley Haider and Imran Javed
Player of the match: Kamran Ghulam (Khyber Pakhtunkhwa)

- Northern won the toss and elected to field.

==== Round 7 ====
23 December 2022
10:00
Scorecard

Northern; 303/7 (50 overs)	v	Central Punjab; 280 (47.5 overs)
Mubasir Khan 102* (62); Usama Mir 4/45 (10 overs)		Tayyab Tahir 61 (70); Mubasir Khan 4/51 (10 overs)

Northern won by 23 runs
State Bank of Pakistan Sports Complex, Karachi
Umpires: Faisal Afridi and Waleed Yaqub
Player of the match: Mubasir Khan (Northern)

- Northern won the toss and elected to bat.

23 December 2022
10:00
Scorecard

Sindh; 233 (42.2 overs)	v	Khyber Pakhtunkhwa; 234/6 (36.1 overs)
Danish Aziz 53 (61); Sajid Khan 3/38 (10 overs)		Israrullah 61 (59); Anwar Ali 2/25 (7 overs)

Khyber Pakhtunkhwa won by 4 wickets
United Bank Limited Sports Complex, Karachi
Umpires: Shozab Raza and Rashid Riaz
Player of the match: Sajid Khan (Khyber Pakhtunkhwa)

- Khyber Pakhtunkhwa won the toss and elected to field.

23 December 2022
10:00
Scorecard

Southern Punjab; 219 (45.5 overs)	v	Balochistan; 223/4 (45.4 overs)
Arafat Minhas 82 (92); Yasir Shah 3/41 (10 overs)		Imran Butt 72 (101); Faisal Akram 3/47 (10 overs)

Balochistan won by 6 wickets
National Bank of Pakistan Sports Complex, Karachi
Umpires: Imtiaz Iqbal and Tariq Rasheed
Player of the match: Kashif Bhatti (Balochistan)

- Southern Punjab won the toss and elected to bat.

==== Round 8 ====
25 December 2022
10:00
Scorecard

Central Punjab; 240 (43 overs)	v	Balochistan; 223/9 (50 overs)
Qasim Akram 131 (108); Amad Butt 2/30 (7 overs)		Haseebullah Khan 51 (74); Aamer Yamin 3/39 (9 overs)

Central Punjab won by 17 runs
State Bank of Pakistan Sports Complex, Karachi
Umpires: Faisal Afridi and Shozab Raza
Player of the match: Qasim Akram (Central Punjab)

- Balochistan won the toss and elected to field.

25 December 2022
10:00
Scorecard

Northern; 272/8 (50 overs)	v	Sindh; 273/5 (48 overs)
Umair Masood 68 (68); Anwar Ali 3/46 (9 overs)		Omair Yousuf 99* 129; Mehran Mumtaz 2/50 (10 overs)

Sindh won by 5 wickets
United Bank Limited Sports Complex, Karachi
Umpires: Rashid Riaz and Tariq Rasheed
Player of the match: Omair Yousuf (Sindh)

- Sindh won the toss and elected to field.

25 December 2022
10:00
Scorecard

Khyber Pakhtunkhwa; 265/9 (50 overs)	v	Southern Punjab; 229 (45 overs)
Sahibzada Farhan 107 (117); Mohammad Ismail 3/58 (10 overs)		Zain Abbas 86 (105); Arshad Iqbal 4/32 (8 overs)

Khyber Pakhtunkhwa won by 36 runs
National Bank of Pakistan Sports Complex, Karachi
Umpires: Aaley Haider and Waleed Yaqub
Player of the match: Sahibzada Farhan (Khyber Pakhtunkhwa)

- Southern Punjab won the toss and elected to field.

==== Round 9 ====
27 December 2022
10:00
Scorecard

Balochistan; 387/7 (50 overs)	v	Northern; 277 (47.3 overs)
Haris Sohail 92 (61); Muhammad Musa 3/83 (10 overs)		Umar Akmal 51 (45); Kashif Bhatti 4/48 (10 overs)

Balochistan won by 110 runs
United Bank Limited Sports Complex, Karachi
Umpires: Rashid Riaz and Waleed Yaqub
Player of the match: Haris Sohail (Balochistan)

- Balochistan won the toss and elected to bat.

27 December 2022
10:00
Scorecard

Sindh; 171 (47.2 overs)	v	Southern Punjab; 172/6 (35.1 overs)
Mohammad Suleman 62 (83); Mohammad Ilyas 2/18 (6 overs)		Mohammad Shehzad 85 (96); Shahnawaz Dahani 3/66 (8.1 overs)

Southern Punjab won by 4 wickets
State Bank of Pakistan Sports Complex, Karachi
Umpires: Shozab Raza and Imran Javed
Player of the match: Mohammad Shehzad (Southern Punjab)

- Southern Punjab won the toss and elected to field.

27 December 2022
10:00
Scorecard

Central Punjab; 315/8 (50 overs)	v	Khyber Pakhtunkhwa; 202 (39.1 overs)
Ahmed Shehzad 71 (91); Mohammad Amir Khan 2/51 (10 overs)		Iftikhar Ahmed 66 (85); Usama Mir 5/42 (9 overs)

Central Punjab won by 113 runs
National Bank of Pakistan Sports Complex, Karachi
Umpires: Faisal Afridi and Tariq Rasheed
Player of the match: Usama Mir (Central Punjab)

- Khyber Pakhtunkhwa won the toss and elected to field.
- As a result of this match, Central Punjab qualified for the semi-finals.

==== Round 10 ====
29 December 2022
10:00
Scorecard

Central Punjab; 310/9 (50 overs)	v	Sindh; 244 (45 overs)
Ahmed Shehzad 67 (83); Shahnawaz Dahani 2/41 (10 overs)		Faraz Ali 64 (80); Usama Mir 3/41 (10 overs)

Central Punjab won by 66 runs
State Bank of Pakistan Sports Complex, Karachi
Umpires: Shozab Raza and Imran Javed
Player of the match: Tayyab Tahir (Central Punjab)

- Sindh won the toss and elected to field.
- As a result of this match, Balochistan and Khyber Pakhtunkhwa qualified for the semi-finals.

29 December 2022
10:00
Scorecard

Khyber Pakhtunkhwa; 133 (31 overs)	v	Balochistan; 137/3 (18.3 overs)
Fakhar Zaman 32 (37); Mohammad Junaid 4/37 (8 overs)		Imran Butt 63* (46); Ihsanullah 2/31 (4 overs)

Balochistan won by 7 wickets
National Bank of Pakistan Sports Complex, Karachi
Umpires: Rashid Riaz and Tariq Rasheed
Player of the match: Mohammad Junaid (Balochistan)

- Balochistan won the toss and elected to field.

29 December 2022
10:00
Scorecard

Northern; 120 (31.5 overs)	v	Southern Punjab; 121/2 (15.1 overs)
Mubasir Khan 29 (40); Mohammad Umair 4/19 (7 overs)		Mohammad Shehzad 60* (50); Kashif Ali 1/26 (3 overs)

Southern Punjab won by 8 wickets
United Bank Limited Sports Complex, Karachi
Umpires: Faisal Afridi and Waleed Yaqub
Player of the match: Sharoon Siraj (Southern Punjab)

- Northern won the toss and elected to bat.
- As a result of this match, Southern Punjab qualified for the semi-finals.

=== Knockout stage ===
==== Bracket ====
Semi-finals
1	Central Punjab	231 (49.2 overs)
4	Southern Punjab	149 (32.1 overs)
2	Balochistan	302/8 (50 overs)
3	Khyber Pakhtunkhwa	264 (47.1 overs)

Final
1	Central Punjab	254 (48.2 overs)
2	Balochistan	204 (42.3 overs)

==== Semi-finals ====
1st Semi-Final
1 January 2023
10:00
Scorecard

Central Punjab; 231 (49.2 overs)	v	Southern Punjab; 149 (32.1 overs)
Tayyab Tahir 58 (73); Sharoon Siraj 2/28 (8 overs)		Arafat Minhas 39 (30); Usama Mir 5/23 (5.1 overs)

Central Punjab won by 82 runs
State Bank of Pakistan Sports Complex, Karachi
Umpires: Rashid Riaz and Aaley Haider
Player of the match: Usama Mir (Central Punjab)

- Central Punjab won the toss and elected to bat.

2nd Semi-Final
1 January 2023
10:00
Scorecard

Balochistan; 302/8 (50 overs)	v	Khyber Pakhtunkhwa; 264 (47.1 overs)
Kashif Bhatti 69* (52); Iftikhar Ahmed 3/52 (9 overs)		Adil Amin 76 (67); Amad Butt 4/52 (8.1 overs)

Balochistan won by 38 runs
State Bank of Pakistan Sports Complex, Karachi
Umpires: Shozab Raza and Faisal Afridi
Player of the match: Kashif Bhatti (Balochistan)

- Khyber Pakhtunkhwa won the toss and elected to field.

==== Final ====
Final
2 January 2023
10:00
Scorecard

Central Punjab; 254 (48.2 overs)	v	Balochistan; 204 (42.3 overs)
Tayyab Tahir 71 (72); Mohammad Junaid 5/56 (10 overs)		Bismillah Khan 70 (106); Ali Shafiq 3/17 (7 overs)

Central Punjab won by 50 runs
State Bank of Pakistan Sports Complex, Karachi
Umpires: Asif Yaqoob and Faisal Afridi
Player of the match: Tayyab Tahir (Central Punjab)

- Central Punjab won the toss and elect to bat.
