= 2021–22 National T20 Cup =

Cricket tournament

- Dates: 23 September – 13 October 2021
- Administrator: Pakistan Cricket Board
- Cricket format: Twenty20
- Tournament format(s): Double round-robin and final
- Host: Pakistan
- Champions: Khyber Pakhtunkhwa (2nd title)
- Participants: 6
- Matches: 33
- Player of the series: Iftikhar Ahmed
- Most runs: Sahibzada Farhan (447)
- Most wickets: Imran Khan (16)
- Official website: National T20 Cup

The 2021–22 National T20 Cup was a Twenty20 domestic cricket competition that was played in Pakistan. It was the 18th season of the National T20 Cup, with the tournament starting on 23 September 2021, and finishing on 13 October 2021. In September 2021, the Pakistan Cricket Board (PCB) confirmed the fixtures for the tournament. Khyber Pakhtunkhwa were the defending champions.

Following the completion of the matches in Rawalpindi, the teams of Sindh, Khyber Pakhtunkhwa, Central Punjab and Northern had all won four of their six games, with Sindh topping the table on net run rate. Balochistan had won just two of their six matches, while Southern Punjab sat at the foot of the table with no wins from their six fixtures.

On 6 October 2021, four members of Balochistan's squad tested positive for COVID-19. As a result, their match scheduled for later the same day was moved back to 9 October 2021, with Northern and Southern Punjab playing each other instead.

Ahead of the penultimate day of group matches, Central Punjab, Khyber Pakhtunkhwa, Northern and Sindh had all qualified for the semi-finals of the tournament, with Balochistan and Southern Punjab being eliminated. In the first semi-final, Khyber Pakhtunkhwa beat Northern by five wickets, with Central Punjab beating Sindh by seven wickets in the second semi-final. Khyber Pakhtunkhwa won the final by seven wickets to win their second successive title. Khyber Pakhtunkhwa' Iftikhar Ahmed was named both the player of the final and the player of the tournament.

== Squads ==
On 20 September 2021, the PCB confirmed all the squads for the tournament. Mohammad Hafeez missed the early matches of the National T20 Cup due to food poisoning, and with further tests he was diagnosed with dengue fever.

Balochistan	Central Punjab	Khyber Pakhtunkhwa	Northern	Sindh	Southern Punjab
Imam-ul-Haq (c); Bismillah Khan (vc, wk); Abdul Bangalzai; Akbar-ur-Rehman; Akif Javed; Amad Butt; Ayaz Tasawwar; Gohar Faiz; Haris Sohail; Jalat Khan; Junaid Khan; Kashif Bhatti; Khurram Shahzad; Mohammad Ibrahim; Umaid Asif; Yasir Shah	Babar Azam (c); Hasan Ali (vc); Abdullah Shafique; Ahmed Safi Abdullah; Ahmed Shehzad; Ehsan Adil; Faheem Ashraf; Hussain Talat; Kamran Akmal (wk); Muhammad Akhlaq (wk); ~~Mohammad Hafeez~~; Qasim Akram; Saif Badar; Shoaib Malik; Usman Qadir; Wahab Riaz; Waqas Maqsood	Mohammad Rizwan (c, wk); Shaheen Afridi (vc); Adil Amin; Arshad Iqbal; Asif Afridi; Fakhar Zaman; Iftikhar Ahmed; Imran Khan; Israrullah; Maaz Khan; Mohammad Haris (wk); Mohammad Imran Khan; Mohammad Wasim; Musadiq Ahmed; Sahibzada Farhan	Shadab Khan (c); Mohammad Nawaz (vc); Rohail Nazir (wk); Ali Imran; Asif Ali; Haider Ali; Haris Rauf; Imad Wasim; Muhammad Musa; Nasir Nawaz; Salman Irshad; Sohail Akhtar; Sohail Tanvir; Umar Amin; Zaman Khan; Zeeshan Malik	Sarfaraz Ahmed (c, wk); Anwar Ali (vc); Abrar Ahmed; Ahsan Ali; Danish Aziz; Hasan Mohsin; Khurram Manzoor; Mir Hamza; Mohammad Hasnain; Mohammad Taha; Rumman Raees; Saud Shakeel; Shan Masood; Shahnawaz Dahani; Sharjeel Khan; Zahid Mahmood	Sohaib Maqsood (c); Zeeshan Ashraf (vc); Aamer Yamin; Azam Khan (wk); Dilbar Hussain; Faisal Akram; Hassan Khan; Imran Randhawa; Khushdil Shah; Mohammad Ilyas; Naseem Shah; Salman Ali Agha; Tayyab Tahir; Umer Khan; Zain Abbas; Zia-ul-Haq

== Points table ==
Pos	Team	Pld	W	L	NR	Pts	NRR
1	Khyber Pakhtunkhwa	10	6	4	0	12	0.794
2	Central Punjab	10	6	4	0	12	0.478
3	Sindh	10	6	4	0	12	0.400
4	Northern	10	6	4	0	12	−0.283
5	Southern Punjab	10	3	7	0	6	−0.515
6	Balochistan	10	3	7	0	6	−0.819

Source: ESPNCricinfo
- Advance to the semi-finals

== Fixtures ==
=== Round-robin ===
23 September 2021
Scorecard

Balochistan; 139/7 (20 overs)	v	Northern; 140/4 (17 overs)
Amad Butt 34 (24); Haris Rauf 2/18 (4 overs)		Haider Ali 58* (41); Yasir Shah 1/23 (4 overs)

Northern won by 6 wickets
Rawalpindi Cricket Stadium, Rawalpindi
Umpires: Mohammad Asif and Ghaffar Kazmi
Player of the match: Haider Ali (Northern)

- Northern won the toss and elected to field.
- Zaman Khan (Northern) made his T20 debut.

23 September 2021
Scorecard

Khyber Pakhtunkhwa; 187/5 (20 overs)	v	Central Punjab; 151/9 (20 overs)
Mohammad Rizwan 65 (40); Hasan Ali 3/30 (4 overs)		Muhammad Akhlaq 62 (35); Shaheen Afridi 3/24 (4 overs)

Khyber Pakhtunkhwa won by 36 runs
Rawalpindi Cricket Stadium, Rawalpindi
Umpires: Imran Javed and Aftab Gillani
Player of the match: Mohammad Rizwan (Khyber Pakhtunkhwa)

- Central Punjab won the toss and elected to field.

24 September 2021
Scorecard

Southern Punjab; 175/7 (20 overs)	v	Sindh; 179/5 (19.2 overs)
Aamer Yamin 43 (26); Mohammad Hasnain 2/40 (4 overs)		Khurram Manzoor 84 (49); Naseem Shah 1/28 (4 overs)

Sindh won by 5 wickets
Rawalpindi Cricket Stadium, Rawalpindi
Umpires: Ghaffar Kazmi and Imran Javed
Player of the match: Khurram Manzoor (Sindh)

- Sindh won the toss and elected to field.
- Faisal Akram (Southern Punjab) made his T20 debut.

24 September 2021
Scorecard

Balochistan; 142/7 (20 overs)	v	Central Punjab; 145/8 (19 overs)
Umaid Asif 32* (18); Usman Qadir 4/25 (4 overs)		Babar Azam 65 (45); Junaid Khan 3/41 (4 overs)

Central Punjab won by 2 wickets
Rawalpindi Cricket Stadium, Rawalpindi
Umpires: Mohammad Asif and Aftab Gillani
Player of the match: Wahab Riaz (Central Punjab)

- Balochistan won the toss and elected to bat.

25 September 2021
Scorecard

Southern Punjab; 152 (19.4 overs)	v	Khyber Pakhtunkhwa; 153/3 (19.4 overs)
Mohammad Imran 54 (46); Imran Khan 4/28 (3.4 overs)		Sahibzada Farhan 73 (49); Naseem Shah 2/27 (4 overs)

Khyber Pakhtunkhwa won by 7 wickets
Rawalpindi Cricket Stadium, Rawalpindi
Umpires: Ahmed Shahab and Imran Javed
Player of the match: Imran Khan (Khyber Pakhtunkhwa)

- Khyber Pakhtunkhwa won the toss and elected to field.

25 September 2021
Scorecard

Northern; 136 (19.3 overs)	v	Sindh; 140/6 (19 overs)
Mohammad Nawaz 30 (34); Shahnawaz Dahani 3/26 (4 overs)		Sharjeel Khan 43 (26); Imad Wasim 2/22 (4 overs)

Sindh won by 4 wickets
Rawalpindi Cricket Stadium, Rawalpindi
Umpires: Aftab Gillani and Ghaffar Kazmi
Player of the match: Sarfaraz Ahmed (Sindh)

- Northern won the toss and elected to bat.

26 September 2021
Scorecard

Southern Punjab; 101 (17.5 overs)	v	Balochistan; 102/3 (17.2 overs)
Sohaib Maqsood 24 (19); Amad Butt 3/11 (3.5 overs)		Abdul Bangalzai 58* (55); Khushdil Shah 1/13 (2 overs)

Balochistan won by 7 wickets
Rawalpindi Cricket Stadium, Rawalpindi
Umpires: Ghaffar Kazmi and Imran Javed
Player of the match: Amad Butt (Balochistan)

- Balochistan won the toss and elected to field.

26 September 2021
Scorecard

Central Punjab; 171/6 (20 overs)	v	Khyber Pakhtunkhwa; 128 (18.2 overs)
Ahmed Shehzad 40 (36); Shaheen Afridi 2/39 (4 overs)		Mohammad Wasim 34 (19); Wahab Riaz 3/21 (3 overs)

Central Punjab won by 43 runs
Rawalpindi Cricket Stadium, Rawalpindi
Umpires: Aftab Gillani and Ahmed Shahab
Player of the match: Hussain Talat (Central Punjab)

- Central Punjab won the toss and elected to bat.

29 September 2021
Scorecard

Sindh; 175/4 (20 overs)	v	Balochistan; 98 (16.4 overs)
Sarfaraz Ahmed 41* (25); Khurram Shahzad 1/25 (4 overs)		Abdul Bangalzai 29 (23); Shahnawaz Dahani 4/12 (2.4 overs)

Sindh won by 77 runs
Rawalpindi Cricket Stadium, Rawalpindi
Umpires: Nasir Hussain and Qaiser Waheed
Player of the match: Zahid Mahmood (Sindh)

- Sindh won the toss and elected to bat.

29 September 2021
Scorecard

Southern Punjab; 175/6 (20 overs)	v	Northern; 177/5 (19.1 overs)
Sohaib Maqsood 75 (47); Muhammad Musa 3/40 (4 overs)		Mohammad Nawaz 56* (35); Hassan Khan 2/13 (3 overs)

Northern won by 5 wickets
Rawalpindi Cricket Stadium, Rawalpindi
Umpires: Imtiaz Iqbal and Saqib Khan
Player of the match: Mohammad Nawaz (Northern)

- Northern won the toss and elected to field.

30 September 2021
Scorecard

Central Punjab; 200/2 (20 overs)	v	Northern; 201/4 (19.4 overs)
Babar Azam 105* (63); Mohammad Nawaz 1/29 (4 overs)		Haider Ali 91* (53); Wahab Riaz 1/17 (3 overs)

Northern won by 6 wickets
Rawalpindi Cricket Stadium, Rawalpindi
Umpires: Nasir Hussain and Saqib Khan
Player of the match: Haider Ali (Northern)

- Central Punjab won the toss and elected to bat.
- Sarmad Hameed (Northern) made his T20 debut.

30 September 2021
Scorecard

Sindh; 150/7 (20 overs)	v	Khyber Pakhtunkhwa; 156/4 (17.4 overs)
Khurram Manzoor 54 (37); Asif Afridi 2/20 (3 overs)		Fakhar Zaman 49 (29); Rumman Raees 1/10 (2 overs)

Khyber Pakhtunkhwa won by 6 wickets
Rawalpindi Cricket Stadium, Rawalpindi
Umpires: Imtiaz Iqbal and Qaiser Waheed
Player of the match: Fakhar Zaman (Khyber Pakhtunkhwa)

- Khyber Pakhtunkhwa won the toss and elected to field.

1 October 2021
Scorecard

Southern Punjab; 174/9 (20 overs)	v	Balochistan; 176/2 (18.4 overs)
Sohaib Maqsood 54 (34); Junaid Khan 3/29 (4 overs)		Abdul Bangalzai 50 (42); Aamer Yamin 1/28 (3 overs)

Balochistan won by 8 wickets
Rawalpindi Cricket Stadium, Rawalpindi
Umpires: Nasir Hussain and Qaiser Waheed
Player of the match: Abdul Bangalzai (Balochistan)

- Balochistan won the toss and elected to field.

1 October 2021
Scorecard

Sindh; 176/7 (20 overs)	v	Northern; 62/3 (7.3 overs)
Sharjeel Khan 64 (43); Shadab Khan 2/33 (4 overs)		Nasir Nawaz 27 (19); Danish Aziz 1/1 (0.3 overs)

Sindh won by 3 runs (DLS method)
Rawalpindi Cricket Stadium, Rawalpindi
Umpires: Imtiaz Iqbal and Saqib Khan
Player of the match: Sharjeel Khan (Sindh)

- Northern won the toss and elected to field.
- Northern were set a revised target of 65 runs from 7.3 overs due to rain.

2 October 2021
Scorecard

Khyber Pakhtunkhwa; 202/5 (20 overs)	v	Balochistan; 147/9 (20 overs)
Sahibzada Farhan 43 (31); Kashif Bhatti 2/34 (3 overs)		Sohail Akhtar 61* (43); Asif Afridi 3/8 (4 overs)

Khyber Pakhtunkhwa won by 55 runs
Rawalpindi Cricket Stadium, Rawalpindi
Umpires: Nasir Hussain and Qaiser Waheed
Player of the match: Asif Afridi (Khyber Pakhtunkhwa)

- Balochistan won the toss and elected to field.

2 October 2021
Scorecard

Central Punjab; 168/8 (20 overs)	v	Sindh; 110/6 (14.4 overs)
Shoaib Malik 85* (47); Rumman Raees 4/33 (4 overs)		Sharjeel Khan 36 (29); Qasim Akram 3/20 (4 overs)

Central Punjab won by 12 runs (DLS method)
Rawalpindi Cricket Stadium, Rawalpindi
Umpires: Imtiaz Iqbal and Saqib Khan
Player of the match: Shoaib Malik (Central Punjab)

- Central Punjab won the toss and elected to bat.
- Sindh were set a revised target of 123 runs from 14.4 overs due to rain.

3 October 2021
Scorecard

Northern; 181/7 (20 overs)	v	Khyber Pakhtunkhwa; 167/8 (20 overs)
Mohammad Nawaz 51 (34); Shaheen Afridi 2/30 (4 overs)		Iftikhar Ahmed 58 (34); Haris Rauf 3/31 (4 overs)

Northern won by 14 runs
Rawalpindi Cricket Stadium, Rawalpindi
Umpires: Nasir Hussain and Qaiser Waheed
Player of the match: Mohammad Nawaz (Northern)

- Khyber Pakhtunkhwa won the toss and elected to field.

3 October 2021
Scorecard

Southern Punjab; 119 (18.4 overs)	v	Central Punjab; 123/3 (17.2 overs)
Azam Khan 45 (41); Hasan Ali 4/24 (3.4 overs)		Babar Azam 59* (49); Hassan Khan 2/15 (4 overs)

Central Punjab won by 7 wickets
Rawalpindi Cricket Stadium, Rawalpindi
Umpires: Imtiaz Iqbal and Saqib Khan
Player of the match: Faheem Ashraf (Central Punjab)

- Central Punjab won the toss and elected to field.
- Babar Azam (Central Punjab) became the fastest batsman, in terms of innings, to score 7,000 runs in T20 cricket (187).

6 October 2021
Scorecard

Sindh; 128/7 (20 overs)	v	Central Punjab; 131/2 (15.4 overs)
Sarfaraz Ahmed 54* (37); Faheem Ashraf 2/19 (4 overs)		Hussain Talat 68* (52); Mir Hamza 1/29 (4 overs)

Central Punjab won by 8 wickets
Gaddafi Stadium, Lahore
Umpires: Asif Yaqoob and Shozab Raza
Player of the match: Hussain Talat (Central Punjab)

- Central Punjab won the toss and elected to field.

6 October 2021
Scorecard

Northern; 211/5 (20 overs)	v	Southern Punjab; 217/6 (19.5 overs)
Haider Ali 72* (40); Zia-ul-Haq 2/48 (4 overs)		Agha Salman 68* (40); Salman Irshad 2/27 (4 overs)

Southern Punjab won by 4 wickets
Gaddafi Stadium, Lahore
Umpires: Faisal Afridi and Rashid Riaz
Player of the match: Agha Salman (Southern Punjab)

- Southern Punjab won the toss and elected to field.

7 October 2021
Scorecard

Central Punjab; 154/9 (20 overs)	v	Southern Punjab; 157/4 (19 overs)
Hussain Talat 68 (47); Zia-ul-Haq 4/40 (4 overs)		Tayyab Tahir 68 (52); Waqas Maqsood 2/42 (4 overs)

Southern Punjab won by 6 wickets
Gaddafi Stadium, Lahore
Umpires: Rashid Riaz and Zameer Haider
Player of the match: Tayyab Tahir (Southern Punjab)

- Southern Punjab won the toss and elected to field.

7 October 2021
Scorecard

Khyber Pakhtunkhwa; 155/6 (20 overs)	v	Balochistan; 158/4 (19.4 overs)
Sahibzada Farhan 78 (49); Junaid Khan 3/32 (4 overs)		Imam-ul-Haq 64* (46); Imran Khan 2/27 (4 overs)

Balochistan won by 6 wickets
Gaddafi Stadium, Lahore
Umpires: Shozab Raza and Waheed Yaqoob
Player of the match: Imam-ul-Haq (Balochistan)

- Balochistan won the toss and elected to field.
- Aamer Azmat (Khyber Pakhtunkhwa) and Hidayatullah (Balochistan) both made their T20 debuts.

8 October 2021
Scorecard

Central Punjab; 194/5 (20 overs)	v	Northern; 195/5 (19.3 overs)
Ahmed Shehzad 77 (45); Aamer Jamal 3/38 (4 overs)		Ali Imran 55 (32); Qasim Akram 2/15 (2 overs)

Northern won by 5 wickets
Gaddafi Stadium, Lahore
Umpires: Asif Yaqoob and Rashid Riaz
Player of the match: Aamer Jamal (Northern)

- Northern won the toss and elected to field.

8 October 2021
Scorecard

Sindh; 196/7 (20 overs)	v	Southern Punjab; 151 (18.5 overs)
Sharjeel Khan 101 (56); Mohammad Imran 2/32 (4 overs)		Tayyab Tahir 32 (23); Rumman Raees 3/23 (3 overs)

Sindh won by 45 runs
Gaddafi Stadium, Lahore
Umpires: Rashid Riaz and Waheed Yaqoob
Player of the match: Sharjeel Khan (Sindh)

- Southern Punjab won the toss and elected to field.

9 October 2021
Scorecard

Sindh; 152/6 (20 overs)	v	Khyber Pakhtunkhwa; 154/3 (18 overs)
Shan Masood 54 (37); Iftikhar Ahmed 2/25 (4 overs)		Iftikhar Ahmed 55* (34); Sohail Khan 1/37 (4 overs)

Khyber Pakhtunkhwa won by 7 wickets
Gaddafi Stadium, Lahore
Umpires: Asif Yaqoob and Zameer Haider
Player of the match: Iftikhar Ahmed (Khyber Pakhtunkhwa)

- Khyber Pakhtunkhwa won the toss and elected to field.
- Niaz Khan (Khyber Pakhtunkhwa) made his T20 debut.

9 October 2021
Scorecard

Balochistan; 185/7 (20 overs)	v	Northern; 186/5 (19.5 overs)
Abdullah Shafique 73 (44); Zaman Khan 3/31 (4 overs)		Ali Imran 64 (45); Umaid Asif 2/31 (4 overs)

Northern won by 5 wickets
Gaddafi Stadium, Lahore
Umpires: Faisal Afridi and Shozab Raza
Player of the match: Ali Imran (Northern)

- Northern won the toss and elected to field.

10 October 2021
Scorecard

Southern Punjab; 193/5 (20 overs)	v	Khyber Pakhtunkhwa; 182/6 (20 overs)
Tayyab Tahir 78 (48); Imran Khan 2/35 (4 overs)		Nabi Gul 54 (31); Mohammad Ilyas 2/37 (4 overs)

Southern Punjab won by 11 runs
Gaddafi Stadium, Lahore
Umpires: Asif Yaqoob and Zameer Haider
Player of the match: Tayyab Tahir (Southern Punjab)

- Khyber Pakhtunkhwa won the toss and elected to field.
- Sharoon Siraj and Yousuf Babar (Southern Punjab) both made their T20 debuts.

10 October 2021
Scorecard

Balochistan; 162/7 (20 overs)	v	Central Punjab; 163/7 (18.1 overs)
Abdullah Shafique 60 (42); Sameen Gul 3/20 (4 overs)		Muhammad Akhlaq 32 (21); Haris Sohail 2/21 (2 overs)

Central Punjab won by 3 wickets
Gaddafi Stadium, Lahore
Umpires: Faisal Afridi and Shozab Raza
Player of the match: Sameen Gul (Central Punjab)

- Central Punjab won the toss and elected to field.

11 October 2021
Scorecard

Balochistan; 112/5 (20 overs)	v	Sindh; 117/5 (18.4 overs)
Sohail Akhtar 36* (36); Abrar Ahmed 2/15 (4 overs)		Mohammad Taha 47* (48); Mohammad Ibrahim 2/24 (4 overs)

Sindh won by 5 wickets
Gaddafi Stadium, Lahore
Umpires: Asif Yaqoob and Rashid Riaz
Player of the match: Mohammad Taha (Sindh)

- Sindh won the toss and elected to field.
- Mohammad Ibrahim (Balochistan) and Mohammad Afzal (Sindh) both made their T20 debuts.

11 October 2021
Scorecard

Khyber Pakhtunkhwa; 207/4 (20 overs)	v	Northern; 115 (18.4 overs)
Kamran Ghulam 110* (64); Aaqib Liaquat 2/44 (4 overs)		Rohail Nazir 34 (23); Khalid Usman 2/4 (2 overs)

Khyber Pakhtunkhwa won by 92 runs
Gaddafi Stadium, Lahore
Umpires: Shozab Raza and Zameer Haider
Player of the match: Kamran Ghulam (Khyber Pakhtunkhwa)

- Northern won the toss and elected to field.
- Aaqib Liaquat and Athar Mahmood (Northern) both made their T20 debuts.
- Kamran Ghulam (Khyber Pakhtunkhwa) scored his first century in T20 cricket.

=== Finals ===
Semi-finals
1	Khyber Pakhtunkhwa	161/5
4	Northern	156/8
2	Central Punjab	145/3
3	Sindh	141/8

Final
1	Khyber Pakhtunkhwa	152/3
2	Central Punjab	148

1st Semi-final
12 October 2021
Scorecard

Northern; 156/8 (20 overs)	v	Khyber Pakhtunkhwa; 161/5 (19.1 overs)
Zeeshan Malik 29 (21); Arshad Iqbal 3/35 (4 overs)		Sahibzada Farhan 53 (39); Nauman Ali 1/17 (4 overs)

Khyber Pakhtunkhwa won by 5 wickets
Gaddafi Stadium, Lahore
Umpires: Asif Yaqoob and Rashid Riaz
Player of the match: Iftikhar Ahmed (Khyber Pakhtunkhwa)

- Khyber Pakhtunkhwa won the toss and elected to field.

2nd Semi-final
12 October 2021
Scorecard

Sindh; 141/8 (20 overs)	v	Central Punjab; 145/3 (17.5 overs)
Khurram Manzoor 34 (40); Qasim Akram 3/15 (4 overs)		Kamran Akmal 51 (36); Sohail Khan 1/24 (4 overs)

Central Punjab won by 7 wickets
Gaddafi Stadium, Lahore
Umpires: Faisal Afridi and Shozab Raza
Player of the match: Qasim Akram (Central Punjab)

- Central Punjab won the toss and elected to field.

Final
13 October 2021
Scorecard

Central Punjab; 148 (19.2 overs)	v	Khyber Pakhtunkhwa; 152/3 (17 overs)
Ahmed Shehzad 44 (36); Iftikhar Ahmed 3/5 (2 overs)		Iftikhar Ahmed 45* (19); Sameen Gul 1/19 (2 overs)

Khyber Pakhtunkhwa won by 7 wickets
Gaddafi Stadium, Lahore
Umpires: Asif Yaqoob and Rashid Riaz
Player of the match: Iftikhar Ahmed (Khyber Pakhtunkhwa)

- Khyber Pakhtunkhwa won the toss and elected to field.
