= 2020–21 Quaid-e-Azam Trophy =

Cricket tournament

- Dates: 25 October 2020 – 5 January 2021
- Administrator: Pakistan Cricket Board
- Cricket format: First-class
- Tournament format(s): Group stage and Final
- Host: Pakistan
- Champions: Central Punjab; Khyber Pakhtunkhwa
- Participants: 6
- Matches: 31
- Player of the series: Hasan Ali
- Most runs: Kamran Ghulam (1,249)
- Most wickets: Sajid Khan (67)
- Official website: www.pcb.com.pk

The 2020–21 Quaid-e-Azam Trophy was a first-class domestic cricket competition that took place in Karachi, Pakistan, from 25 October 2020 to 5 January 2021. Central Punjab cricket team were the defending champions. Central Punjab started their title defence poorly, with no wins from their first five matches. Despite being at the bottom of the points table half-way through the tournament, they won four of the next five matches to finish second in their group, advancing to the final with Khyber Pakhtunkhwa.

The final finished in a tie, with Central Punjab and Khyber Pakhtunkhwa sharing the title. It was the first time the final of the Quaid-e-Azam Trophy had been tied, and the first tie in the final of a domestic first-class cricket tournament. Central Punjab's Hasan Ali was named the player of the final and the tournament. Khyber Pakhtunkhwa batsman Kamran Ghulam set a new record for runs scored during a Quaid-e-Azam Trophy season with 1,249; the previous record had stood since 1983–84.

== Squads ==
Balochistan	Central Punjab	Khyber Pakhtunkhwa	Northern	Sindh	Southern Punjab
Yasir Shah (c); Bismillah Khan (vc, wk); Abdul Rehman Muzammil; Abdul Bangalzai; Adnan Akmal (wk); Akhtar Shah; Amad Butt; Ayaz Tasawwar; Imran Butt; Imran Farhat; Kashif Bhatti; Khurram Shehzad; Najeebullah; Sami Aslam; Taimur Ali; Taj Wali	Azhar Ali (c); Saad Nasim (vc); Ahmed Bashir; Ahmed Safi Abdullah; Ahmed Shehzad; Ali Shan; Ali Zaryab; Bilal Asif; Ehsan Adil; Hasan Ali; Kamran Akmal (wk); Mohammad Saad; Qasim Akram; Rizwan Hussain; ~~Salman Butt~~; Usman Salahuddin; Waqas Maqsood	Ashfaq Ahmed (c); Adil Amin (vc); Ahmed Jamal; Imran Khan; Israrullah; Junaid Khan; Kamran Ghulam; Khalid Usman; Mohammad Mohsin; Nabi Gul; Rehan Afridi (wk); Sahibzada Farhan; Sajid Khan; Sameen Gul; Samiullah; Usman Shinwari	Nauman Ali (c); Zeeshan Malik (vc); Ali Sarfraz; Asif Ali; Faizan Riaz; Farhan Shafiq; Hammad Azam; Jamal Anwar (wk); Nasir Nawaz; Naved Malik; Sadaf Hussain; Salman Irshad; Sarmad Bhatti; Tauseeq Shah; Umar Amin; Waqas Ahmed	Sarfaraz Ahmed (c, wk); Asad Shafiq (vc); Ashiq Ali; Azizullah; Fawad Alam; Ghulam Mudassar; Hasan Mohsin; Khurram Manzoor; Mir Hamza; Mohammad Asghar; Omair Yousuf; Saad Ali; Saud Shakeel; Sharjeel Khan; Sohail Khan; Tabish Khan	Shan Masood (c); Hussain Talat (vc); Aamer Yamin; Bilawal Bhatti; Dilbar Hussain; Imran Rafiq; Maqbool Ahmed (wk); Mohammad Abbas; Mohammad Ilyas; Mohammad Irfan; Saif Badar; Salman Ali Agha; Umar Siddiq; Umar Khan; Zahid Mahmood; Zeeshan Ashraf (wk)

On 21 October 2020, the Pakistan Cricket Board (PCB) confirmed the squads for the tournament. Ahead of the opening round of matches, Salman Butt withdrew from the tournament and was replaced by Ali Zaryab in Central Punjab's team.

== Points table ==
Team	Pld	W	L	D	T	Pts	NRR
Khyber Pakhtunkhwa	10	5	1	4	0	161	–0.013
Central Punjab	10	4	3	3	0	137	–0.111
Southern Punjab	10	4	4	2	0	129	–0.145
Balochistan	10	3	4	3	0	128	+0.098
Northern	10	3	3	4	0	123	+0.183
Sindh	10	1	5	4	0	87	–0.006

== Fixtures ==
=== Round 1 ===
25–28 October 2020
Scorecard

Balochistan	v	Khyber Pakhtunkhwa
362 (110.2 overs); Bismillah Khan 118 (242); Sajid Khan 3/96 (30.2 overs)		167 (46.5 overs); Khalid Usman 57* (88); Khurram Shehzad 5/27 (10 overs)
217/8d (65.5 overs); Sami Aslam 48 (91); Sajid Khan 5/78 (24.5 overs)		226 (65.2 overs); Adil Amin 67 (123); Kashif Bhatti 4/69 (22.2 overs)

Balochistan won by 186 runs
United Bank Limited Sports Complex, Karachi
Umpires: Qaiser Waheed and Nasir Hussain

- Balochistan won the toss and elected to bat.
- Akhtar Shah (Balochistan) made his first-class debut.

25–28 October 2020
Scorecard

Central Punjab	v	Sindh
207 (86.4 overs); Ahmed Shehzad 69 (155); Tabish Khan 5/44 (22 overs)		239 (105.3 overs); Fawad Alam 115 (250); Waqas Maqsood 4/56 (24 overs)
243/7d (94 overs); Usman Salahuddin 75 (181); Saud Shakeel 2/11 (3 overs)		214/4 (43.4 overs); Saud Shakeel 61 (70); Qasim Akram 2/22 (4 overs)

Sindh won by 6 wickets
National Stadium, Karachi
Umpires: Zameer Haider and Faisal Afridi

- Sindh won the toss and elected to field.
- Qasim Akram (Central Punjab) made his first-class debut.

25–28 October 2020
Scorecard

Northern	v	Southern Punjab
165 (48.4 overs); Faizan Riaz 29 (31); Zahid Mahmood 4/41 (9.4 overs)		507/9d (113.1 overs); Hussain Talat 253 (310); Nauman Ali 4/153 (41 overs)
246 (65.1 overs); Hammad Azam 79 (117); Zahid Mahmood 6/57 (14.1 overs)

Southern Punjab won by an innings and 96 runs
National Bank of Pakistan Sports Complex, Karachi
Umpires: Imtiaz Iqbal and Ghaffar Kazmi

- Northern won the toss and elected to bat.
- Hussain Talat (Southern Punjab) scored his maiden double century in first-class cricket.
- Zahid Mahmood (Southern Punjab) took his first ten-wicket match haul and his 100th wicket in first-class cricket.

=== Round 2 ===
31 October–3 November 2020
Scorecard

Balochistan	v	Southern Punjab
372 (104.3 overs); Imran Farhat 116 (165); Zahid Mahmood 3/101 (29 overs)		331 (92.2 overs); Salman Ali Agha 97 (141); Yasir Shah 5/115 (28.2 overs)
112 (31.3 overs); Imran Butt 32 (47); Zahid Mahmood 4/20 (6.3 overs)		154/6 (44.2 overs); Salman Ali Agha 42* (53); Yasir Shah 3/55 (19.2 overs)

Southern Punjab won by 4 wickets
National Stadium, Karachi
Umpires: Imtiaz Iqbal and Imran Jarved

- Toss uncontested, Southern Punjab elected to field.
- Dilbar Hussain (Southern Punjab) made his first-class debut.

31 October–3 November 2020
Scorecard

Sindh	v	Khyber Pakhtunkhwa
361 (127.5 overs); Sarfaraz Ahmed 131* (232); Khalid Usman 3/108 (35.5 overs)		307 (105.4 overs); Israrullah 67 (124); Ashiq Ali 5/94 (32.4 overs)
234/7d (76 overs); Asad Shafiq 72* (130); Sajid Khan 3/78 (22 overs)		96/7 (45.4 overs); Adil Amin 38 (77); Ashiq Ali 6/33 (19.4 overs)

Match drawn
United Bank Limited Sports Complex, Karachi
Umpires: Qaiser Waheed and Saqib Khan

- Sindh won the toss and elected to bat.

31 October–3 November 2020
Scorecard

Central Punjab	v	Northern
159 (56.2 overs); Ali Zaryab 78 (144); Nauman Ali 4/55 (19.2 overs)		354 (100 overs); Umar Amin 94 (181); Ahmed Safi Abdullah 5/106 (24.4 overs)
227 (64.3 overs); Azhar Ali 63 (150); Nauman Ali 7/53 (25.3 overs)		35/1 (5 overs); Umair Masood 21 (10); Ahmed Safi Abdullah 1/6 (2 overs)

Northern won by 9 wickets
National Bank of Pakistan Sports Complex, Karachi
Umpires: Zameer Haider and Ghaffar Kazmi

- Toss uncontested, Northern elected to field.

=== Round 3 ===
6–9 November 2020
Scorecard

Balochistan	v	Central Punjab
306 (102 overs); Ali Waqas 75 (188); Ahmed Safi Abdullah 3/56 (23 overs)		251 (75 overs); Azhar Ali 63 (147); Amad Butt 6/67 (23 overs)
213 (74.1 overs); Ali Waqas 39 (61); Ahmed Safi Abdullah 4/31 (13.1 overs)		255/7 (66 overs); Azhar Ali 95* (184); Amad Butt 2/45 (17 overs)

Match drawn
National Stadium, Karachi
Umpires: Ghaffar Kazmi and Nasir Hussain

- Central Punjab won the toss and elected to field.

6–9 November 2020
Scorecard

Northern	v	Sindh
328 (91 overs); Mohammad Nawaz 73 (112); Sohail Khan 4/52 (15 overs)		217 (57.3 overs); Sharjeel Khan 48 (48); Nauman Ali 5/62 (20.3 overs)
311/6d (88.1 overs); Sarmad Bhatti 108 (266); Mohammad Asghar 2/87 (19 overs)		294 (91.2 overs); Saud Shakeel 174 (296); Nauman Ali 5/95 (30 overs)

Northern won by 128 runs
United Bank Limited Sports Complex, Karachi
Umpires: Faisal Afridi and Saqib Khan

- Northern won the toss and elected to bat.

6–9 November 2020
Scorecard

Khyber Pakhtunkhwa	v	Southern Punjab
304 (108.3 overs); Adil Amin 90 (181); Mohammad Abbas 6/33 (20 overs)		288 (79.3 overs); Hussain Talat 131 (180); Sajid Khan 6/71 (25.3 overs)
246 (72.3 overs); Musadiq Ahmed 86 (184); Mohammad Abbas 4/39 (14 overs)		187 (71.1 overs); Umar Siddiq 56 (130); Khalid Usman 4/50 (19.1 overs)

Khyber Pakhtunkhwa won by 75 runs
National Bank of Pakistan Sports Complex, Karachi
Umpires: Qaiser Waheed and Imran Jarved

- Toss uncontested, Southern Punjab elected to field.

=== Round 4 ===
20–23 November 2020
Scorecard

Balochistan	v	Northern
418 (124.3 overs); Azeem Ghumman 95 (233); Nauman Ali 4/129 (46 overs)		275 (89.4 overs); Faizan Riaz 78 (109); Kashif Bhatti 4/114 (39.4 overs)
250/5d (52.2 overs); Akbar-ur-Rehman 93 (103); Waqas Ahmed 2/57 (11.2 overs)		385/8 (84 overs); Umar Amin 123 (162); Kashif Bhatti 5/159 (35 overs)

Match drawn
National Bank of Pakistan Sports Complex, Karachi
Umpires: Faisal Afridi and Qaiser Waheed

- Toss uncontested, Northern elected to field.
- Nasir Nawaz (Northern) made his first-class debut.

20–23 November 2020
Scorecard

Sindh	v	Southern Punjab
383 (111.5 overs); Omair Yousuf 153 (253); Zahid Mahmood 4/84 (21.5 overs)		295 (86 overs); Zain Abbas 95 (162); Tabish Khan 4/83 (25 overs)
253/6d (58.4 overs); Sharjeel Khan 121 (126); Mohammad Imran 2/67 (15.4 overs)		206/4 (62 overs); Saif Badar 70* (100); Abrar Ahmed 3/80 (21 overs)

Match drawn
National Stadium, Karachi
Umpires: Zameer Haider and Imtiaz Iqbal

- Sindh won the toss and elected to bat.
- Abrar Ahmed (Sindh) made his first-class debut.

20–23 November 2020
Scorecard

Central Punjab	v	Khyber Pakhtunkhwa
158 (66.2 overs); Usman Salahuddin 54 (145); Sajid Khan 4/56 (26 overs)		236 (81.3 overs); Khalid Usman 92* (141); Waqas Maqsood 3/41 (13.3 overs)
248 (85.2 overs); Mohammad Saad 77 (190); Sajid Khan 6/101 (36.2 overs)		172/5 (45 overs); Adil Amin 53 (106); Ahmed Safi Abdullah 3/87 (16 overs)

Khyber Pakhtunkhwa won by 5 wickets
United Bank Limited Sports Complex, Karachi
Umpires: Nasir Hussain and Imran Jarved

- Central Punjab won the toss and elected to bat.

=== Round 5 ===
26–29 November 2020
Scorecard

Balochistan	v	Sindh
458/9d (111.5 overs); Akbar-ur-Rehman 164 (206); Shahnawaz Dahani 4/79 (21 overs)		407 (121.2 overs); Saud Shakeel 142 (233); Jalat Khan 5/85 (30.2 overs)
231/4d (66 overs); Akbar-ur-Rehman 76 (115); Asad Shafiq 1/10 (4 overs)		96/3 (27 overs); Saud Shakeel 48 (73); Taj Wali 1/9 (4 overs)

Match drawn
State Bank of Pakistan Sports Complex, Karachi
Umpires: Qaiser Waheed and Saqib Khan

- Toss uncontested, Sindh elected to field.

26–29 November 2020
Scorecard

Southern Punjab	v	Central Punjab
527/7d (134 overs); Salman Ali Agha 169 (183); Hasan Ali 2/79 (20 overs)		459 (140.4 overs); Usman Salahuddin 76 (181); Bilawal Bhatti 3/60 (22 overs)
190/5d (40 overs); Saif Badar 63 (77); Bilal Asif 2/65 (15 overs)		164/9 (39 overs); Ali Shan 43 (30); Zahid Mahmood 5/23 (12 overs)

Match drawn
United Bank Limited Sports Complex, Karachi
Umpires: Faisal Afridi and Nasir Hussain

- Southern Punjab won the toss and elected to bat.

26–29 November 2020
Scorecard

Northern	v	Khyber Pakhtunkhwa
460/9d (102.2 overs); Faizan Riaz 146 (189); Zohaib Khan 3/46 (11 overs)		318 (76.2 overs); Khalid Usman 113* (158); Munir Riaz 5/113 (19 overs)
247/4d (49.1 overs); Umair Masood 103* (126); Sajid Khan 2/72 (17 overs)		319/9 (97 overs); Musadiq Ahmed 85 (101); Nauman Ali 4/112 (42 overs)

Match drawn
National Stadium, Karachi
Umpires: Imtiaz Iqbal and Imran Jarved

- Northern won the toss and elected to bat.
- Mohammad Wasim (Khyber Pakhtunkhwa) and Munir Riaz (Northern) both made their first-class debuts.
- Munir Riaz (Northern) took his first five-wicket haul in first-class cricket.
- Umair Masood (Northern) scored his maiden century in first-class cricket.

=== Round 6 ===
2–5 December 2020
Scorecard

Khyber Pakhtunkhwa	v	Balochistan
320 (89.5 overs); Kamran Ghulam 153 (253); Khurram Shehzad 4/80 (19.5 overs)		120 (33 overs); Bismillah Khan 50 (60); Irfanullah Shah 4/41 (12 overs)
199 (60 overs); Israrullah 86 (144); Taj Wali 5/57 (18 overs)		224 (76.1 overs); Ali Waqas 44 (105); Sameen Gul 3/45 (19 overs)

Khyber Pakhtunkhwa won by 175 runs
State Bank of Pakistan Sports Complex, Karachi
Umpires: Qaiser Waheed and Saqib Khan

- Toss uncontested, Balochistan elected to field.

2–5 December 2020
Scorecard

Central Punjab	v	Sindh
276 (103.2 overs); Usman Salahuddin 80 (168); Tabish Khan 3/37 (20.2 overs)		92 (29.3 overs); Saad Ali 17 (28); Waqas Maqsood 6/25 (10.3 overs)
247 (61 overs); Ahmed Safi Abdullah 83* (60); Abrar Ahmed 4/40 (10 overs)		204 (76.5 overs); Sharjeel Khan 89 (138); Hasan Ali 4/66 (19.5 overs)

Central Punjab won by 227 runs
National Stadium, Karachi
Umpires: Shozab Raza and Rashid Riaz

- Toss uncontested, Sindh elected to field.

2–5 December 2020
Scorecard

Southern Punjab	v	Northern
285 (86.3 overs); Umar Siddiq 89 (203); Sadaf Hussain 3/45 (15 overs)		381 (83 over); Umar Amin 102 (150); Zahid Mahmood 4/120 (26 overs)
295 (93.2 overs); Agha Salman 89 (121); Nauman Ali 6/107 (23.2 overs)		200/4 (41.5 overs); Nasir Nawaz 68 (80); Umer Khan 2/47 (9.5 overs)

Northern won by 6 wickets
United Bank Limited Sports Complex, Karachi
Umpires: Faisal Afridi and Aftab Gillani

- Southern Punjab won the toss and elected to bat.

=== Round 7 ===
8–11 December 2020
Scorecard

Southern Punjab	v	Balochistan
256 (79.5 overs); Agha Salman 50 (52); Taj Wali 3/66 (25 overs)		164 (41.4 overs); Ayaz Tasawwar 76 (97); Aamer Yamin 6/47 (14 overs)
312 (96.5 overs); Imran Rafiq 97 (217); Jalat Khan 5/76 (25.5 overs)		199 (55.4 overs); Imran Farhat 84 (120); Zia-ul-Haq 7/35 (15.4 overs)

Southern Punjab won by 205 runs
National Stadium, Karachi
Umpires: Ahsan Raza and Asif Yaqoob

- Southern Punjab won the toss and elected to bat.

8–11 December 2020
Scorecard

Sindh	v	Khyber Pakhtunkhwa
229 (81.2 overs); Asad Shafiq 60 (111); Irfanullah Shah 5/33 (19 overs)		414 (126.5 overs); Kamran Ghulam 166 (295); Mir Hamza 3/89 (30 overs)
148 (50.4 overs); Sharjeel Khan 51 (61); Sajid Khan 5/49 (17.4 overs)

Khyber Pakhtunkhwa won by an innings and 37 runs
State Bank of Pakistan Sports Complex, Karachi
Umpires: Faisal Afridi and Waleed Yaqub

- Toss uncontested, Khyber Pakhtunkhwa elected to field.

8–11 December 2020
Scorecard

Northern	v	Central Punjab
243 (57 overs); Asif Ali 72* (39); Hasan Ali 4/48 (15 overs)		234 (81 overs); Muhammad Akhlaq 67 (121); Nauman Ali 7/84 (24 overs)
156 (45.3 overs); Nasir Nawaz 42 (46); Ahmed Safi Abdullah 4/46 (8 overs)		166/4 (44.5 overs); Mohammad Saad 50* (81); Nauman Ali 4/69 (18 overs)

Central Punjab won by 6 wickets
United Bank Limited Sports Complex, Karachi
Umpires: Shozab Raza and Saqib Khan

- Northern won the toss and elected to bat.
- Shadab Majeed (Northern) made his first-class debut.

=== Round 8 ===
14–17 December 2020
Scorecard

Central Punjab	v	Balochistan
369 (103 overs); Ali Zaryab 117 (178); Jalat Khan 6/116 (38 overs)		130 (38.2 overs); Adnan Akmal 33* (76); Hasan Ali 5/32 (9.2 overs)
49/1 (13.5 overs); Ali Zaryab 22* (45); Raza-ul-Hasan 1/7 (2.5 overs)		285 (62.2) (f/o); Umaid Asif 69 (100); Hasan Ali 5/76 (17 overs)

Central Punjab won by 9 wickets
State Bank of Pakistan Sports Complex, Karachi
Umpires: Rashid Riaz and Aftab Gillani

- Central Punjab won the toss and elected to bat.

14–17 December 2020
Scorecard

Northern	v	Sindh
203 (68.2 overs); Mohammad Nawaz 79 (128); Azizullah 3/48 (17.2 overs)		514/8d (143.1 overs); Sharjeel Khan 133 (164); Mohammad Nawaz 5/108 (24.1 overs)
423/6 (120 overs); Mubasir Khan 164 (241); Shahnawaz Dahani 3/93 (22 overs)

Match drawn
National Stadium, Karachi
Umpires: Ahsan Raza and Shozab Raza

- Northern won the toss and elected to bat.
- Mubasir Khan (Northern) made his first-class debut, and scored his maiden century in first-class cricket.

14–17 December 2020
Scorecard

Khyber Pakhtunkhwa	v	Southern Punjab
487 (147.1 overs); Adil Amin 172 (330); Zahid Mahmood 6/163 (45.1 overs)		290 (64.2 overs); Aamer Yamin 93 (55); Sajid Khan 5/104 (21 overs)
6/0 (0.3 overs); Musadiq Ahmed 6* (3 overs)		200 (50.2 overs) (f/o); Mohammad Umair 77 (102); Khalid Usman 3/63 (13 overs)

Khyber Pakhtunkhwa won by 10 wickets
United Bank Limited Sports Complex, Karachi
Umpires: Imran Jarved and Waleed Yaqub

- Khyber Pakhtunkhwa won the toss and elected to bat.

=== Round 9 ===
20–23 December 2020
Scorecard

Northern	v	Balochistan
203 (62.1 overs); Ali Sarfraz 38 (62); Kashif Bhatti 5/75 (28 overs)		372 (116.1 overs); Akbar-ur-Rehman 82 (155); Nauman Ali 6/107 (46.1 overs)
164 (45 overs); Umar Amin 29 (34); Raza-ul-Hasan 4/50 (17 overs)

Balochistan won by an innings and 5 runs
United Bank Limited Sports Complex, Karachi
Umpires: Imtiaz Iqbal and Waleed Yaqub

- Northern won the toss and elected to bat.

20–23 December 2020
Scorecard

Sindh	v	Southern Punjab
217 (64.4 overs); Mohammad Hasan 111 (140); Aamer Yamin 3/31 (12 overs)		247 (81.1 overs); Imran Rafiq 67 (152); Mohammad Asghar 4/81 (26.1 overs)
399/5d (85 overs); Sharjeel Khan 123* (157); Aamer Yamin 2/85 (18 overs)		370/5 (93.4 overs); Imran Rafiq 130 (254); Tabish Khan 3/95 (20 overs)

Southern Punjab won by 5 wickets
State Bank of Pakistan Sports Complex, Karachi
Umpires: Rashid Riaz and Aftab Gillani

- Toss uncontested, Southern Punjab elected to field.

20–23 December 2020
Scorecard

Central Punjab	v	Khyber Pakhtunkhwa
351/7d (107.5 overs); Saad Nasim 136* (189); Irfanullah Shah 3/53 (20.5 overs)		312/7d (121.4 overs); Adil Amin 96 (276); Qasim Akram 5/51 (19 overs)
265/7d (82 overs); Mohammad Saad 83 (155); Sajid Khan 2/90 (25 overs)		65/2 (21 overs); Israrullah 31* (69); Hasan Ali 1/14 (4 overs)

Match drawn
National Stadium, Karachi
Umpires: Shozab Raza and Asif Yaqoob

- Central Punjab won the toss and elected to bat.

=== Round 10 ===
26–29 December 2020
Scorecard

Balochistan	v	Sindh
414 (126 overs); Akbar-ur-Rehman 164 (306); Mohammad Asghar 5/101 (34 overs)		195 (66 overs); Asad Shafiq 87* (168); Kashif Bhatti 4/56 (17 overs)
100/1 (26.2 overs); Ali Rafiq 55* (77); Tabish Khan 1/37 (8.2 overs)		317 (115.5 overs) (f/o); Saud Shakeel 90 (175); Kashif Bhatti 4/70 (22 overs)

Balochistan won by 9 wickets
United Bank Limited Sports Complex, Karachi
Umpires: Asif Yaqoob and Imtiaz Iqbal

- Balochistan won the toss and elected to bat.
- Azam Khan (Sindh) made his first-class debut.

26–29 December 2020
Scorecard

Central Punjab	v	Southern Punjab
493/7d (117.4 overs); Usman Salahuddin 219* (346); Zahid Mahmood 4/152 (27)		187 (67.4 overs); Umar Siddiq 51 (125); Bilawal Iqbal 3/27 (16 overs)
63/0 (10 overs); Muhammad Akhlaq 38* (42)		368 (100.4 overs) (f/o); Zain Abbas 118 (172); Ahmed Safi Abdullah 4/108 (31 overs)

Central Punjab won by 10 wickets
State Bank of Pakistan Sports Complex, Karachi
Umpires: Imran Jarved and Shozab Raza

- Toss uncontested, Southern Punjab elected to field.
- Usman Salahuddin (Central Punjab) scored his maiden double century in first-class cricket.

26–29 December 2020
Scorecard

Khyber Pakhtunkhwa	v	Northern
521 (130.2 overs); Israrullah 127 (142); Ali Sarfraz 4/15 (5 overs)		336 (107.5 overs); Nasir Nawaz 65 (68); Sajid Khan 4/114 (38.5 overs)
252/8d (68.4 overs); Adil Amin 77 (108); Mohammad Nawaz 5/69 (20.4 overs)		108/5 (37 overs); Nasir Nawaz 46 (51); Khalid Usman 3/26 (11 overs)

Match drawn
National Stadium, Karachi
Umpires: Ahsan Raza and Waleed Yaqub

- Khyber Pakhtunkhwa won the toss and elected to bat.

== Final ==
1–5 January 2021
Scorecard

Khyber Pakhtunkhwa	v	Central Punjab
300 (97.5 overs); Kamran Ghulam 76 (129); Hasan Ali 4/62 (23.5 overs)		257/9d (83 overs); Qasim Akram 60* (102); Irfanullah Shah 4/73 (20 overs)
312 (93.5 overs); Kamran Ghulam 108 (208); Waqas Maqsood 4/77 (23.5 overs)		355 (117.3 overs); Hasan Ali 106* (61); Sajid Khan 4/86 (26.3 overs)

Match tied
National Stadium, Karachi
Umpires: Asif Yaqoob and Rashid Riaz
Player of the match: Hasan Ali (Central Punjab)

- Khyber Pakhtunkhwa won the toss and elected to bat.
