= Munir Riaz =

Pakistani cricketer (born 2001)

Personal information
- Born: 2 November 2001 (age 25); Rawalpindi, Punjab, Pakistan
- Role: All-rounder

Domestic team information
- Years: Team
- 2020–21: Northern
- 2023-present: Rawalpindi cricket team (squad no. 178)
- Source: Cricinfo, 26 November 2020

Munir Riaz (born 2 November 2001) is a Pakistani cricketer. He made his first-class debut on 26 November 2020, for Northern, in the 2020–21 Quaid-e-Azam Trophy. taking a five-wicket haul. Prior to his first-class debut, he was part of Pakistan's squad for the 2018 Under-19 Cricket World Cup.
