= Ali Imran (cricketer, born 1998) =

Pakistani cricketer (born 1998)

Personal information
- Born: 25 February 1998 (age 28); Islamabad, Pakistan
- Batting: Right-handed
- Bowling: Right-arm medium
- Role: All-rounder

Domestic team information
- Years: Team
- 2020: Northern
- Source: Cricinfo, 15 November 2016

Ali Imran (born 25 February 1998) is a Pakistani cricketer. He made his first-class debut for Islamabad in the 2016–17 Quaid-e-Azam Trophy on 12 November 2016. He made his List A debut on 10 January 2017 for Islamabad in the 2016–17 Regional One Day Cup. He was the leading run-scorer for Pakistan Television in the 2018–19 Quaid-e-Azam One Day Cup, with 430 runs in nine matches.

In December 2018, Ali was named in the Pakistan team for the 2018 ACC Emerging Teams Asia Cup. He made his Twenty20 debut for Peshawar in the 2018–19 National T20 Cup on 22 December 2018. In March 2019, he was named in Baluchistan's squad for the 2019 Pakistan Cup. In January 2021, he was named in Northern's squad for the 2020–21 Pakistan Cup.
