= Zafar Gohar =

British Pakistani cricketer (born 1995)

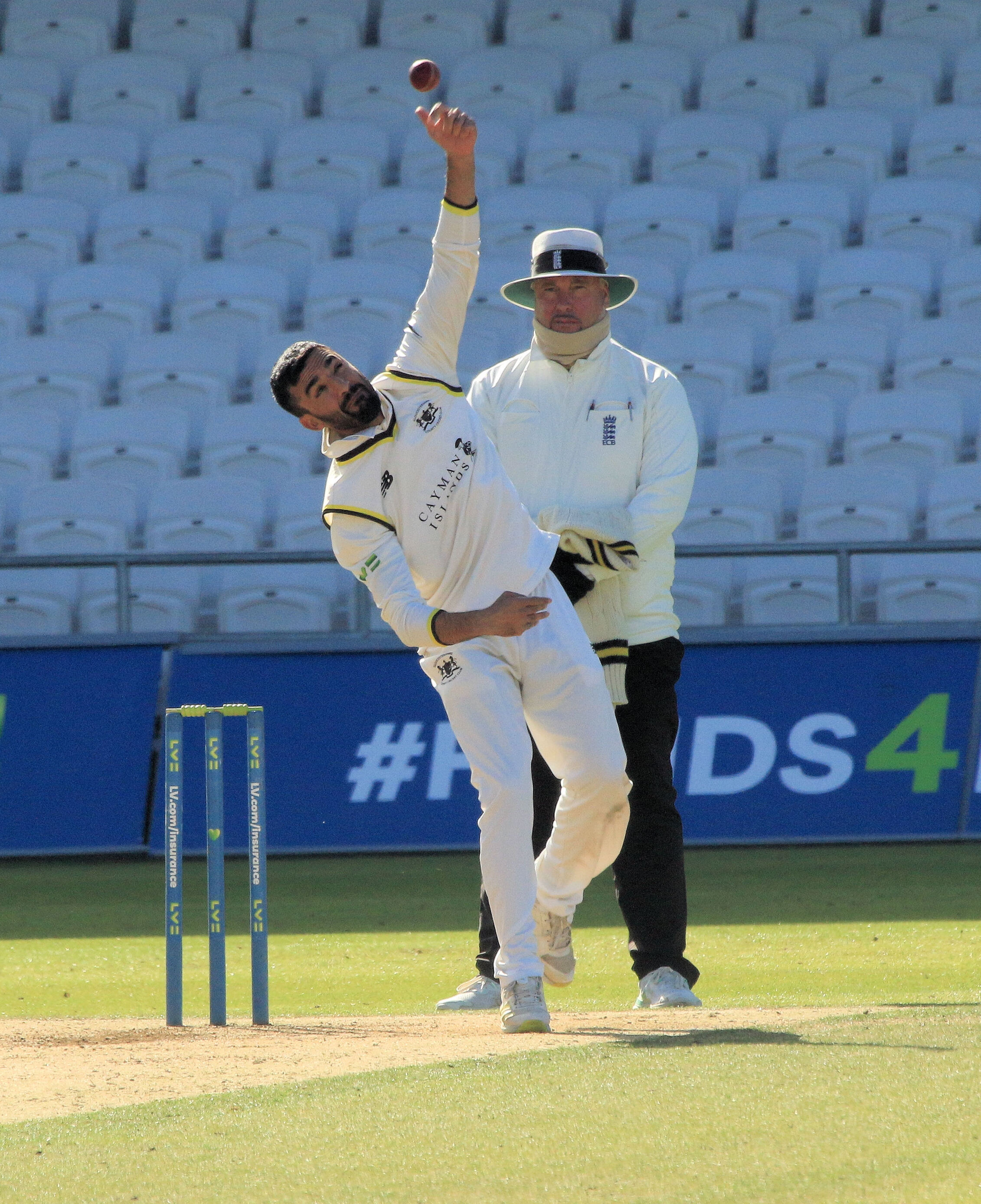
- Gohar bowling for Gloucestershire in 2022

Personal information
- Born: 1 February 1995 (age 31); Lahore, Punjab, Pakistan
- Nickname: Mastana
- Height: 5 ft 11 in (180 cm)
- Batting: Left-handed
- Bowling: Slow left-arm orthodox
- Role: Bowling all-rounder

International information
- National side: Pakistan (2015–2021)
- Only Test (cap 241): 3 January 2021 v New Zealand
- Only ODI (cap 208): 17 November 2015 v England

Domestic team information
- Years: Team
- 2016–2017: Lahore Qalandars
- 2018–2021: Islamabad United
- 2019/20–2022/23: Central Punjab
- 2021–2024: Gloucestershire
- 2025–2026: Middlesex
- 2025/26: Ghani Glass

Career statistics
Competition	Test	ODI	FC	LA
Matches	1	1	111	107
Runs scored	71	15	3,476	1,319
Batting average	35.50	15.00	23.17	18.31
100s/50s	0/0	0/0	1/19	0/5
Top score	37	15	100*	62
Balls bowled	192	60	22,190	5,414
Wickets	0	2	358	148
Bowling average	–	27.00	31.98	29.43
5 wickets in innings	–	0	23	2
10 wickets in match	–	0	4	0
Best bowling	–	2/54	7/79	6/21
Catches/stumpings	0/–	0/–	38/–	21/–
- Source: Cricinfo, 27 September 2026

Zafar Gohar (born 1 February 1995) is a British Pakistani cricketer who plays for Middlesex. Previously, he played for the Pakistan national cricket team between 2015 and 2021.

== Early career ==
Inspired by former New Zealand international Daniel Vettori and former England international Graeme Swann, Gohar developed through school, club and age-group levels in Lahore before advancing to Pakistan's Under-19 side. He captained his school team at Central Model High School, Lahore, and later played at Garhi Shahu Club.

== Youth career ==
Gohar has represented Pakistan at U15 and U16 levels under the guidance of coach Shafqat Rana, including selection for the U15 World Cup in the West Indies. At Under-19 level, Gohar featured in the 2012 U19 World Cup in Australia, taking eight wickets in eight matches, and was later named best bowler of a tri-nation youth series in England against Bangladesh and England after taking 18 wickets in seven games.

== Domestic career ==
=== Pakistan ===
At domestic level, Gohar has represented Zarai Taraqiati Bank Limited (ZTBL) Under-19s, where he claimed 40 wickets and scored 450 runs before captaining the side, and later played for their senior team in the PCB Ramadan Cup alongside established internationals including Saeed Ajmal and Imran Nazir.

In September 2019, he was named in Central Punjab's squad for the 2019–20 Quaid-e-Azam Trophy tournament. In a Round 8 fixture versus Northern on 10 November 2022, he delivered outstanding bowling figures of 6 for 96 in 31.2 overs, helping Central Punjab dismiss Northern for 333 after being bowled out for 385 themselves. He was named as the player of the tournament. He was retained by Central Punjab for the 2020–21 domestic season.

In December 2021, he was signed by Islamabad United following the players' draft for the 2022 Pakistan Super League.

=== England ===
==== Gloucestershire (2021–2024) ====
In December 2021, he was re-signed by Gloucestershire for the 2022 season.

Gohar has made notable contributions in English county cricket as an all-rounder, supporting his teams with both ball and bat. While primarily known for his slow left-arm orthodox spin, he delivered standout performances for Gloucestershire, including 47 wickets in the 2022 County Championship, ranking among the top bowlers in Division One. Over his Gloucestershire tenure, he recorded his best innings figures of 6 for 43 and accumulated more than 118 wickets in 34 first-class matches. In addition, he proved valuable with the bat in the lower order, scoring over 2,500 runs in county cricket at an average above 22, including a century.

==== Middlesex (2025–present) ====
In November 2024, his dual skill set led Middlesex to sign him as a locally qualified player from 2025, strengthening both their red-ball and white-ball squads.

Since joining Middlesex, Zafar Gohar has contributed significantly as an all-rounder, with several impactful performances in both the County Championship and the One-Day Cup. In a Championship fixture against Gloucestershire, his former team, he recorded his best figures for the county with 5 for 53, helping set up an innings victory. He also proved valuable with the bat, making several lower-order contributions, including a match-winning six under pressure to defeat Kent at Lord's. In the 2025 One-Day Cup, he produced an all-round display against Leicestershire, taking 4 for 39 before scoring 48 from 34 balls to keep Middlesex's knockout hopes alive.

== International career ==
Gohar made his One Day International debut for Pakistan against England on 17 November 2015.

In October 2020, he was named in a 22-man squad of "probables" for Pakistan's home series against Zimbabwe. In November 2020, he was named in Pakistan's 35-man squad for their tour to New Zealand. In December 2020, Shadab Khan was ruled out of the first Test match due to an injury. Gohar was added to Pakistan's squad as Khan's replacement. He made his Test debut for Pakistan, against New Zealand, on 3 January 2021.

In January 2021, he was named in Pakistan's Twenty20 International (T20I) squad for their series against South Africa. In August 2021, he was signed by Gloucestershire to play for the remainder of the 2021 County Championship in England.
