= Aamer Azmat =

Pakistani cricketer (born 2000)

Personal information
- Born: 26 November 2000 (age 25); Peshawar, Khyber Pakhtunkhwa, Pakistan
- Batting: Right-handed
- Bowling: Right-arm off break
- Role: Batsman

Domestic team information
- Years: Team
- 2022-present: Multan Sultans (squad no. 79)
- 2023: Khyber Pakhtunkhwa (squad no. 69)
- Source: Cricinfo, 18 January 2021

Aamer Azmat (born 26 November 2000) is a Pakistani cricketer. He made his List A debut on 18 January 2021, for Khyber Pakhtunkhwa, in the 2020–21 Pakistan Cup. He made his Twenty20 debut on 7 October 2021, for Khyber Pakhtunkhwa in the 2021–22 National T20 Cup.
