= Umair Masood =

Pakistani cricketer (born 1997)

Personal information
- Born: 7 December 1997 (age 28); Rawalpindi, Punjab, Pakistan
- Source: Cricinfo, 14 January 2017

Umair Masood (born 7 December 1997) is a Pakistani cricketer. He made his List A debut on 14 January 2017 for Rawalpindi in the 2016–17 Regional One Day Cup. Prior to his List A debut, he was named in Pakistan's squad for the 2016 Under-19 Cricket World Cup.

He made his first-class debut for Rawalpindi in the 2017–18 Quaid-e-Azam Trophy on 26 September 2017. He made his Twenty20 debut for Rawalpindi in the 2017–18 National T20 Cup on 12 November 2017. In November 2020, during the 2020–21 Quaid-e-Azam Trophy, Masood scored his maiden century in first-class cricket, with an unbeaten 103 runs against Khyber Pakhtunkhwa.
