= Nasir Nawaz =

Pakistani cricketer (born 1998)

Personal information
- Born: 5 October 1998 (age 26); South Waziristan, Khyber Pakhtunkhwa, Pakistan
- Nickname: Janbaaz
- Batting: Right-handed
- Bowling: Right-arm medium
- Role: Batter

Domestic team information
- Years: Team
- 2021–2022: Islamabad United
- Source: Cricinfo, 12 April 2022

Nasir Nawaz (born 5 October 1998) is a Pakistani cricketer.

== Career ==
He made his List A debut for Punjab in the 2017 Pakistan Cup on 19 April 2017. Prior to his List A debut, he was named as captain of Pakistan's squad for the 2016 Under-19 Asia Cup. He made his Twenty20 debut for Rawalpindi in the 2017–18 National T20 Cup on 12 November 2017. He made his first-class debut on 20 November 2020, for Northern, in the 2020–21 Quaid-e-Azam Trophy. In January 2021, he was named in Northern's squad for the 2020–21 Pakistan Cup. In February 2022, he was drafted by Islamabad United for the remainder of the 2022 Pakistan Super League, as a replacement for Alex Hales who left the tournament due to bio bubble fatigue amid COVID-19.
