= Muhammad Faizan =

Pakistani cricketer (born 1997)

Personal information
- Born: 7 May 1997 (age 29); Nankana Sahib, Punjab, Pakistan
- Batting: Right-handed
- Bowling: Right-arm medium-fast
- Role: All-rounder

Domestic team information
- Years: Team
- 2020: Lahore Qalandars (squad no. 6)
- Source: Cricinfo, 3 March 2020

Muhammad Faizan (born 7 May 1997) is a Pakistani cricketer. In December 2019, he was drafted by the Pakistan Super League (PSL) franchise team Lahore Qalandars as their Emerging category player during the 2020 PSL draft. He made his Twenty20 debut for the Lahore Qalandars against Marylebone Cricket Club (MCC) on 14 February 2020, during the MCC's tour of Pakistan. He made his List A debut on 22 March 2022, for Central Punjab in the 2021–22 Pakistan Cup.
