= Ashiq Ali =

Pakistani cricketer (born 1995)

Personal information
- Born: 1 May 1995 (age 31); Karachi, Pakistan
- Source: Cricinfo, 30 December 2017

Ashiq Ali (born 1 May 1995) is a Pakistani cricketer. He made his first-class debut for Habib Bank Limited in the 2014–15 Quaid-e-Azam Trophy on 23 November 2014. He made his List A debut for Habib Bank Limited in the 2015–16 National One Day Cup on 16 January 2016.

In April 2018, he was named in Federal Areas' squad for the 2018 Pakistan Cup. In December 2018, he was named in Pakistan's team for the 2018 ACC Emerging Teams Asia Cup. In March 2019, he was named in Sindh's squad for the 2019 Pakistan Cup.
