= Kamran Ghulam =

Pakistani cricketer (born 1995)

Personal information
- Born: 10 October 1995 (age 31); Upper Dir, Khyber Pakhtunkhwa, Pakistan
- Height: 5 ft 6 in (168 cm)
- Batting: Right-handed
- Bowling: Slow left arm orthodox
- Role: Batting all-rounder

International information
- National side: Pakistan (2024–present)
- Test debut (cap 257): 15 October 2024 v England
- Last Test: 25 January 2025 v West Indies
- ODI debut (cap 240): 13 January 2023 v New Zealand
- Last ODI: 8 February 2025 v New Zealand
- ODI shirt no.: 82

Domestic team information
- Years: Team
- 2016–2017: Islamabad United
- 2019–2023: Khyber Pakhtunkhwa
- 2022–2024: Lahore Qalandars (squad no. 82)
- 2025: Multan Sultans (squad no. 82)
- 2026: Rawalpindiz

Career statistics
Competition	Test	ODI	FC	LA
Matches	6	11	72	110
Runs scored	312	210	4,941	3,767
Batting average	28.36	30.00	45.33	41.39
100s/50s	1/1	1/1	18/21	9/22
Top score	118	103	166	123*
Balls bowled	18	24	2,716	2,343
Wickets	0	1	40	71
Bowling average	–	16.00	38.35	27.67
5 wickets in innings	–	–	0	2
10 wickets in match	–	–	0	0
Best bowling	–	1/7	4/58	7/23
Catches/stumpings	2/–	4/–	64/–	49/–
- Source: Cricinfo, 7 May 2026

Kamran Ghulam (born 10 October 1995) is a Pakistani cricketer. He was part of Pakistan's squad for the 2014 ICC Under-19 Cricket World Cup. In September 2019, he was named in Khyber Pakhtunkhwa's squad for the 2019–20 Quaid-e-Azam Trophy tournament.

Ghulam considers Indian all-rounder Ravindra Jadeja to be his role model.

== Early career ==
Ghulam was born in Dir Khyber Pakhtunkhwa into a large family, having six sisters and eleven brothers, including six older brothers who have played club cricket in their native village.

Ghulam began as a tape ball specialist whose street performances drew large crowds. Encouraged by family and community members who recognized his potential, he transitioned from informal tape-ball matches to organized club cricket in Peshawar, where his performances soon impressed coaches and senior players. Initially finding the competitive structure challenging, he gradually adapted, improving both as a batsman and a bowler. Ghulam later represented Dir District and subsequently Abbottabad Region at the Under-19 level, performing strongly in district and regional trials that launched his professional pathway.

== Youth career ==
In August 2013, during the England Under-19s Tri-Nation Tournament, Ghulam secured the Player of the Match award for his bowling against Bangladesh U19, with figures of 4/18 and an economy rate of 1.80. He then hit a 53-ball century not out against England U19, the hosts, in Leicester, which was the record for the fastest century in youth ODI cricket until it was broken in July 2025 by India's Vaibhav Sooryavanshi. A few days later, against the same opposition, he hit 61 not out off 32 deliveries, at a strike rate of nearly 200, in the final in Nottingham, which Pakistan U19 won.

In January 2014, Ghulam hit a quick-fire 102 off 89 deliveries against India in the final of the ACC Under-19 Asia Cup, which Pakistan lost. Ghulam was named Player of the Series for his all-round performance, with 217 runs and 7 wickets.

In February 2014, in the quarter-final of the ICC Under-19 World Cup against Sri Lanka U19, Ghulam scored 52 off 44 deliveries after being promoted up the order, as he batted at No. 3, and later took 2 wickets for 19 runs, with an economy rate of 2.92.

== Domestic career ==
In December 2020, during the 2020–21 Quaid-e-Azam Trophy, he became the first cricketer to score 1,000 runs in a single season of the Quaid-e-Azam Trophy, since the tournament was revamped the previous year. Later the same month, he was shortlisted as one of the Domestic Cricketers of the Year for the 2020 PCB Awards.

In January 2021, in the final of the Quaid-e-Azam Trophy, he scored a century in the second innings of the match, and also broke the record for the most runs scored in a single edition of the tournament. Following the final, he was named as the Best Batsman of the tournament. He was then named in Khyber Pakhtunkhwa's squad for the 2020–21 Pakistan Cup.

On 11 October 2021, in the final group match of the 2021–22 National T20 Cup, he scored his first century in T20 cricket, with an unbeaten 110 runs.

== International career ==
In January 2021, following his performance in the Quaid-e-Azam Trophy, declared the Best Batsman of the tournament, he was named in Pakistan's Test squad for their series against South Africa.

In October 2021, he was named in the Pakistan Shaheens squad for their tour of Sri Lanka.

In November 2021, he was named in Pakistan's Test squad for their series against Bangladesh.

In February 2022, he was named as a reserve player in Pakistan's Test squad for their series against Australia.

On 13 January 2023, Ghulam made his ODI debut as a concussion substitute, against New Zealand at Karachi.

On 13 October 2024, he was named in the squad for the remaining two fixtures of the three-match home Test series against England. Two days later, he made his Test debut at Multan, and became only the 13th Pakistan player to score a century in his first Test.

On November 28, 2024, Ghulam scored his maiden ODI century against Zimbabwe in Bulawayo, crafting a 103 off 99 balls with 10 fours and 4 sixes. His innings anchored Pakistan to a total of 303/6, playing a pivotal role in their 99-run victory and 2-1 series win.

On 19 December 2024, his innings of 63 off 32 led Pakistan to another ODI series win, against South Africa, in which he was announced Player of the Match.
