= Qasim Akram =

Pakistani cricketer

Personal information
- Full name: Qasim Akram
- Born: 1 December 2002 (age 23); Abbottabad, Khyber Pakhtunkhwa, Pakistan
- Height: 5 ft 8 in (173 cm)
- Batting: Right-handed
- Bowling: Right-arm off break
- Role: Batting all-rounder

International information
- National side: Pakistan (2023–2024)
- T20I debut (cap 107): 3 October 2023 v Hong Kong
- Last T20I: 5 December 2024 v Zimbabwe
- T20I shirt no.: 73

Domestic team information
- Years: Team
- 2020/21–2023: Central Punjab
- 2020–2023: Karachi Kings

Career statistics
Competition	T20I	First-class	List A	T20
Matches	4	34	59	73
Runs scored	41	1,893	1,588	1,074
Batting average	13.66	45.07	32.40	21.05
100s/50s	0/0	6/7	2/9	0/5
Top score	20	138	131	64
Balls bowled	23	2,944	1,863	699
Wickets	3	43	47	37
Bowling average	7.66	40.48	36.95	21.48
5 wickets in innings	0	1	1	0
10 wickets in match	0	0	0	0
Best bowling	2/5	5/51	6/26	3/6
Catches/stumpings	2/–	27/–	24/–	30/–
- Source: Cricinfo, 5 December 2024

Qasim Akram (born 1 December 2002) is a Pakistani cricketer.

An all-rounder who's primarily a batsman who can bowl off-spin, he considers former Pakistan international player Mohammad Hafeez to be his role model.

== Early career ==
Qasim was born in Abbottabad but learned his cricket in Lahore, joining the city's Riazuddin Cricket Academy before playing at club level and then at Under-16. He'd then perform in the Under-19s at the district level for Lahore in 2018 and then at the national level in 2019, when he would be selected for the 2019 ACC Under-19 Asia Cup.

== Youth career ==
In December 2019, he was named in Pakistan's squad for the 2020 Under-19 Cricket World Cup.

In April 2021, he was named as the captain of the Pakistan under-19 team, ahead of their tour of Bangladesh.

In December 2021, he was named as the captain of Pakistan's team for the 2022 ICC Under-19 Cricket World Cup in the West Indies.

In February 2022, in the fifth-place play-off match in the Under-19 Cricket World Cup, Qasim became the first player to score a century (135*) and take a five-wicket haul (5 for 37) in a Youth ODI match, steamrolling Sri Lanka by a mammoth 238 runs.

== Domestic career ==
In September 2020, he made his Twenty20 debut for Central Punjab in the 2020–21 National T20 Cup.

In October 2020, he made his first-class debut, also for Central Punjab, in the 2020–21 Quaid-e-Azam Trophy.

In December 2020, he was shortlisted as one of the Men's Emerging Cricketer of the Year for the 2020 PCB Awards.

In January 2021, he was named in Central Punjab's squad for the 2020–21 Pakistan Cup. He made his List A debut for Central Punjab few days later. During the tournament, he scored his first century in List A cricket, with an unbeaten 108 runs.

In December 2021, he was signed by the Karachi Kings following the players' draft for the 2022 Pakistan Super League.

He took his first five-wicket haul in List A for Pakistan A against United Arab Emirates A, on 17 July 2023 in the 2023 ACC Emerging Teams Asia Cup.

== International career ==
In October 2021, he was named in the Pakistan Shaheens squad for their tour of Sri Lanka.
