= Mohammad Umair (cricketer) =

Pakistani cricketer (born 1994)

Personal information
- Born: 31 October 1994 (age 32)
- Source: ESPNcricinfo

Mohammad Umair (born 31 October 1994) is a Pakistani first-class cricketer. He made his List A debut for Zarai Taraqiati Bank Limited in the 2018–19 Quaid-e-Azam One Day Cup on 6 September 2018.
