= Kashif Bhatti =

Pakistani cricketer

Personal information
- Born: 25 July 1986 (age 40); Nawabshah, Sindh, Pakistan
- Batting: Right-handed
- Bowling: Slow left-arm orthodox
- Role: Bowling all-rounder

Domestic team information
- Years: Team
- 2005–2007: Hyderabad
- 2017: Karachi Kings
- 2017/18–2018/19: Sui Southern Gas Company
- 2018: Multan Sultans
- 2019/20: Sindh
- 2021–present: Balochistan
- 2026: Quetta Gladiators
- Source: Cricinfo, 24 January 2021

Kashif Bhatti (born 25 July 1986) is a Pakistani cricketer who plays for Balochistan. He represented Karachi Kings in the second edition and Quetta Gladiators in 11th season of Pakistan Super League.

== Domestic career ==
He was the leading wicket-taker for Sui Southern Gas Company in the 2017–18 Quaid-e-Azam Trophy, with 49 dismissals in nine matches.

In April 2018, he was named in Punjab's squad for the 2018 Pakistan Cup. He was the leading wicket-taker for Sui Southern Gas Company in the 2018–19 Quaid-e-Azam One Day Cup with fourteen wickets in five matches. He was also the leading wicket-taker for Sui Southern Gas Company in the 2018–19 Quaid-e-Azam Trophy, with 49 dismissals in eight matches.

In March 2019, he was named in Punjab's squad for the 2019 Pakistan Cup. In September 2019, he was named in Sindh's squad for the 2019–20 Quaid-e-Azam Trophy tournament.

In January 2021, he was named in Balochistan's squad for the 2020–21 Pakistan Cup. In October 2021, he signed to play for Ashcombe Park Cricket Club in the North Staffordshire and South Cheshire League in England for the 2022 season.

== International career ==
In October 2019, he was named in Pakistan's Test squad for their series against Australia. In December 2019, he was named in Pakistan's Test squad for the two-match series against Sri Lanka.

In June 2020, he was named in a 29-man squad for Pakistan's tour to England during the COVID-19 pandemic. However, on 23 June 2020, Bhatti was one of seven players from Pakistan's squad to test positive for COVID-19. He later returned a positive COVID-19 test while in England, but was able to rejoin the squad on 16 July 2020 after two negative tests and a period of self-isolation. In July, he was shortlisted in Pakistan's 20-man squad for the Test matches against England.
