= Umar Amin =

Pakistani cricketer (born 1989)

Personal information
- Born: 16 October 1989 (age 37); Rawalpindi, Punjab, Pakistan
- Height: 6 ft 0 in (1.83 m)
- Batting: Left-handed
- Bowling: Right-arm medium
- Role: Top-order batter

International information
- National side: Pakistan (2010–2018)
- Test debut (cap 200): 13 July 2010 v Australia
- Last Test: 6 August 2010 v England
- ODI debut (cap 176): 15 June 2010 v South Africa
- Last ODI: 19 January 2018 v New Zealand
- ODI shirt no.: 84
- T20I debut (cap 51): 27 July 2013 v West Indies
- Last T20I: 28 January 2018 v New Zealand
- T20I shirt no.: 84

Domestic team information
- Years: Team
- 2008–2015: Rawalpindi Rams
- 2015/16–2018/19: Sui Southern Gas Company
- 2016; 2021: Islamabad United
- 2017–2018: Quetta Gladiators (squad no. 20)
- 2019–2020: Peshawar Zalmi (squad no. 200)
- 2019–present: Northern (squad no. 84)

Career statistics
| Competition | Test | ODI | FC | LA |
|---|---|---|---|---|
| Matches | 4 | 16 | 163 | 153 |
| Runs scored | 99 | 271 | 10,695 | 5,353 |
| Batting average | 12.37 | 18.06 | 41.13 | 39.07 |
| 100s/50s | 0/0 | 0/1 | 28/53 | 11/29 |
| Top score | 33 | 59 | 281 | 156 |
| Balls bowled | 132 | 42 | 3,546 | 1,025 |
| Wickets | 3 | 0 | 49 | 22 |
| Bowling average | 21.00 | – | 34.30 | 40.54 |
| 5 wickets in innings | 0 | – | 0 | 0 |
| 10 wickets in match | 0 | – | 0 | 0 |
| Best bowling | 1/7 | – | 5/67 | 3/31 |
| Catches/stumpings | 1/– | 6/– | 130/– | 69/– |
Medal record
Men's Cricket
Representing Pakistan
South Asian Games
| Bronze medal – third place | 2010 Dhaka | Team |
- Source: Cricinfo, 10 December 2022

Umar Amin (born 16 October 1989) is a Pakistani international cricketer. Amin made his One Day International debut in the opening match of the 2010 Asia Cup against Sri Lanka.

Amin was also named in Pakistan's squad for the two-match test series against Australia, held in England. He made his Test debut on 13 July 2010 in the opening match of the series at Lord's Cricket Ground, London, England.

== Early and domestic career ==
Amin was born on 16 October 1989 in Rawalpindi, Punjab. In 2001, in seventh grade Amin began playing youth league cricket. His proficiency grew over the years to the point where, at the U19 stage, he was selected for the Pakistan U19 side, after which he was called up for Pakistan's A squad. He also got a call up from the National Bank of Pakistan and was selected in the NBP team led by captain Kamran Akmal. Amin was part of the Pakistan A team which toured Australia.

In April 2018, Amin was named captain of Sindh's squad for the 2018 Pakistan Cup. He was the leading run-scorer for Sui Southern Gas Corporation in the 2018–19 Quaid-e-Azam Trophy, with 728 runs in nine matches. In March 2019, he was named to Sindh's squad for the 2019 Pakistan Cup.

In September 2019, Amin was named to Northern's squad for the 2019–20 Quaid-e-Azam Trophy tournament. In January 2021, he was named to Northern's squad for the 2020–21 Pakistan Cup.

== International career ==
Amin's international career began in the 2010 Asia Cup when he debuted against Sri Lanka, scoring seven runs. He made his debut using a bat once owned by Sachin Tendulkar, given to him by Shoaib Akhtar after a match winning innings for Rawalpindi in a domestic game. In the second match against India, which Pakistan lost, Amin scored only five runs and in the final match he scored 22 before being run-out in a bizarre manner, as Amin had punched a delivery to long-off and completed an easy single in the 22nd over with Pakistan coasting at 135 for 1. After grounding his bat, Amin started to walk across the stumps to take his position at the non-striker's end because the bowler, Mahmudullah, was bowling from round the wicket. While doing so, Amin was out of the crease with his bat in the air, and the bowler – not facing the batsman and unaware of Amin's position – perfunctorily whipped off the bails. Shakib Al Hasan, fielding at extra cover, noticed Amin was out of his crease and appealed for a run-out which was then given by the third Umpire.

Amin made his test debut against Australia and scored one run in his debut innings and 33 in the second innings as Pakistan lost by 150 runs. He did, however, contribute valuable runs in his T20I debut, scoring 47 off 34 balls, the highest score among his compatriots that day as Pakistan won the match.

Amin was chosen as captain of Pakistan A during South Africa's tour of the United Arab Emirates (UAE) in October–November 2013. Many former Pakistani legends saw him as the best young batsman in Pakistan and a strong contender for future captaincy. Rashid Latif said about him, "However, considering our planning for the 2015 World Cup, I believe young Umar Amin can be groomed as ODI team leader".

After being promoted before a home series against South Africa in the UAE, Amin scored only 52 runs in four innings. In the T20I series against Zimbabwe and Sri Lanka he managed 22 runs in three innings before being dropped from the national squad. However he excelled in the ODi series against Zimbabwe scoring a fifty in the only game he played.

== Current status ==
As of 2026, Umar Amin is involved with cricket coaching in the London Cricket County Academy in the UK.
