= Adil Amin =

Pakistani cricketer

Personal information
- Born: 13 December 1990 (age 35); Peshawar, Pakistan
- Batting: Right-handed
- Bowling: Right-arm offbreak
- Role: Bowling all-rounder

Domestic team information
- Years: Team
- 2019–present: Khyber Pakhtunkhwa
- 2020: Peshawar Zalmi (squad no. 77)

Career statistics
Competition	FC	LA	T20
Matches	54	74	46
Runs scored	2,602	2,285	865
Batting average	35.16	45.70	27.03
100s/50s	2/15	5/13	0/1
Top score	211*	140	53*
Balls bowled	1,988	1,404	534
Wickets	19	17	21
Bowling average	49.42	73.58	30.61
5 wickets in innings	1	0	0
10 wickets in match	0	0	0
Best bowling	5/81	2/14	4/27
Catches/stumpings	32/-	27/-	16/0
Medal record
Men's Cricket
Representing Pakistan
South Asian Games
Bronze medal – third place	2010 Dhaka	Team
- Source: Cricinfo, 29 October 2019

Adil Amin (born 13 December 1990) is a Pakistani cricketer who plays for Khyber Pakhtunkhwa. In April 2018, he was named in Khyber Pakhtunkhwa's squad for the 2018 Pakistan Cup. In March 2019, he was named in Khyber Pakhtunkhwa's squad for the 2019 Pakistan Cup.

In September 2019, he was named in Khyber Pakhtunkhwa's squad for the 2019–20 Quaid-e-Azam Trophy tournament. In October 2019, the Pakistan Cricket Board (PCB) named him as one of the six players to watch ahead of the 2019–20 National T20 Cup tournament. In December 2019, he was drafted by the Pakistan Super League (PSL) franchise team Peshawar Zalmi as their Silver Category pick at the 2020 PSL draft.

In January 2021, he was named in Khyber Pakhtunkhwa's squad for the 2020–21 Pakistan Cup.
