= Balochistan cricket team =

Pakistani cricket team

Personnel
- Owner: Balochistan Cricket Association

Team information
- Colours: Dark Gray Orange
- Founded: 2019; 6 years ago
- Dissolved: 2023; 2 years ago
- Home ground: Bugti Stadium, Quetta
- Secondary home ground(s): Gwadar Stadium, Gwadar

History
- Quaid-e-Azam Trophy wins: 0
- Pakistan Cup wins: 1 (2021/22)
- National T20 Cup wins: 0
First-class
List A / T20

Balochistan cricket team was a domestic cricket team in Pakistan representing Balochistan province. It competed in domestic first-class, List A and T20 cricket competitions, namely the Quaid-e-Azam Trophy, Pakistan Cup and National T20 Cup. The team was operated by the Balochistan Cricket Association.

== History ==
=== Before 2019 ===
The Balochistan team was founded in 1954 and played its inaugural season in the Quaid-e-Azam Trophy in 1954. In 1954-55 Balochistan played one match in the Quaid-e-Azam Trophy, losing to Sindh by 53 runs at the Racecourse Ground, Quetta. They were captained by Athar Khan, who made 36 and 57 and took two wickets. A combined Railways and Balochistan team played the MCC in Multan in 1955–56, losing by an innings. None of the team had played for Balochistan in the 1954-55 match.

Each season from 1972–73 to 1978-79 (except for 1975-76 when they conceded without playing) Balochistan played one match in the Quaid-i-Azam Trophy. They lost all six matches, five of them by an innings and the other by 259 runs. They were dismissed for under 100 seven times. Their lowest total was 53 (followed by 77 in the second innings) against National Bank of Pakistan (476 for 6 declared) in 1974–75. They dismissed their opponents only once. In 1973-74 they conceded a total of 951 for 6 declared to Sindh, Aftab Baloch scoring 428 for Sindh. He made 200 not out for National Bank against Balochistan in 1974–75, giving him a career average of 628.00 against Balochistan. Sindh's victory margin in the 1973-74 match, an innings and 575 runs, is one of the highest in the history of first-class cricket. Shahid Fawad was Balochistan's most successful batsman in this period. He played four matches, scoring 32 not out (top score) and 25 (top score) in 1972–73, and 33 (second-top score) and 94 (top score, and Baluchistan's top score in the 1970s) against Sindh in 1978–79. In 1978-79 a "North West Frontier Province and Balochistan" team played the touring Indians in a drawn first-class match in Peshawar. The team actually included no players from Balochistan teams or from Balochistan province.

=== Since 2019 ===
A new Balochistan team was one of the six teams introduced as a part of the restructure of domestic cricket announced by the Pakistan Cricket Board (PCB) on 31 August 2019.

==== Structure ====
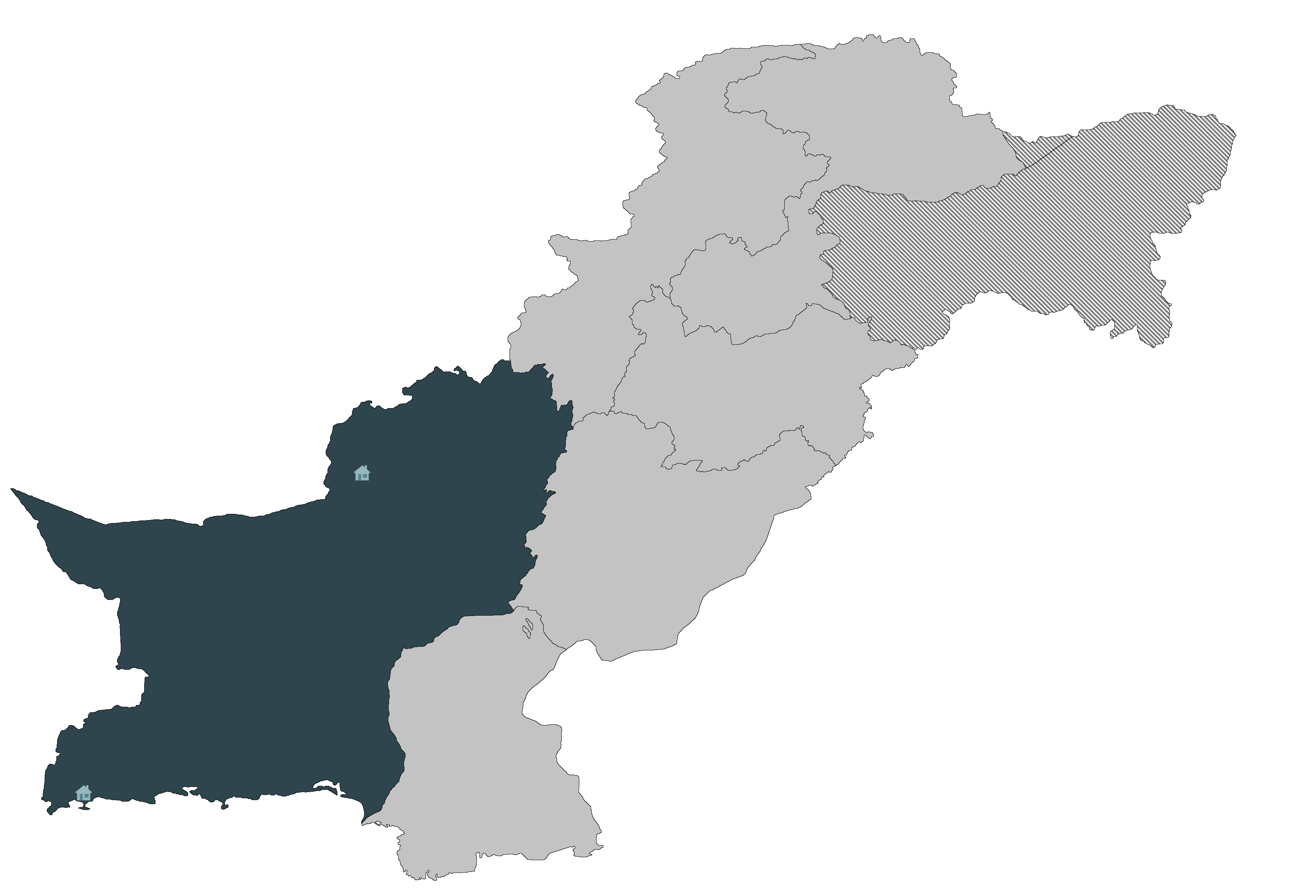
Balochistan Cricket Association comprises Dera Murad Jamali and Quetta

In 2019, domestic cricket in Pakistan was reorganised into six regional teams (on provincial lines). A three tier bottom-up system is in operation with the Tier 1 teams participating in the Quaid-e-Azam Trophy (First Class), Pakistan Cup (List A) and National T20 Cup (Regional T20). The Tier 2 teams participate in the City Cricket Association Tournament whilst the Tier 3 teams participate in various local tournaments as both tiers feed players to the Tier 1 team.

- Tier 1: Balochistan
- Tier 2: Quetta, Pishin, Sibi, Noshki, Killa Abdullah, Naseerabad, Loralai, Gwadar, Panjgur, Turbat, Khuzdar, Jaffarabad & Lasbela.
- Tier 3: Various Clubs & Schools.

== Season summaries ==
=== 2019/20 Season ===
Balochistan finished in sixth and second place respectively in the Quaid-e-Azam Trophy and National T20 Cup. The Pakistan Cup was cancelled this season due to the COVID-19 pandemic.

=== 2020/21 Season ===
The team finished in fourth, sixth and sixth place respectively, in the Quaid-e-Azam Trophy, Pakistan Cup and the National T20 Cup.

== See also ==
- Central Punjab cricket team
- Khyber Pakhtunkhwa cricket team
- Northern cricket team
- Sindh cricket team
- Southern Punjab cricket team
