= Central Punjab cricket team =

Pakistani first-class cricket team

Personnel
- Captain: Babar Azam
- Coach: Akram Raza
- Owner: Central Punjab Cricket Association

Team information
- Colors: Blue Orange
- Founded: 2019; 7 years ago
- Dissolved: 2023; 3 years ago
- Home ground: Gaddafi Stadium, Lahore
- Secondary home ground(s): Iqbal Stadium, Faisalabad

History
- Quaid-e-Azam Trophy wins: 2 (2019/20 & 2020/21)
- Pakistan Cup wins: 1 (2022/23)
- National T20 Cup wins: 0
First-class
List A / T20

Central Punjab was a domestic cricket team in Pakistan representing the northern and central parts of the Punjab province. It competed in domestic first-class, List A and T20 cricket competitions, namely the Quaid-e-Azam Trophy, Pakistan Cup and National T20 Cup. The team was operated by the Central Punjab Cricket Association.

== History ==
The team was introduced as a part of a new domestic structure introduced by the Pakistan Cricket Board (PCB) on 31 August 2019. On 3 September 2019, PCB confirmed the inaugural squad for the team. Babar Azam was announced as the captain of the team.

=== 2019/20 season ===
Central Punjab won the Quaid-e-Azam Trophy, defeating Northern by an innings and 16 runs in the final. The team was eliminated in the group stage of the National T20 Cup. The Pakistan Cup was cancelled this season due to the COVID-19 pandemic.

=== 2020/21 season ===
The team came back from a bad start in defence of the Quaid-e-Azam Trophy to win five successive matches and reach the final. The final against Khyber Pakhtunkhwa resulted in a tie, and they were declared joint winners. The team again struggled in the limited overs formats, finishing in fourth and fifth place respectively in the Pakistan Cup and National T20 Cup.

== Structure ==
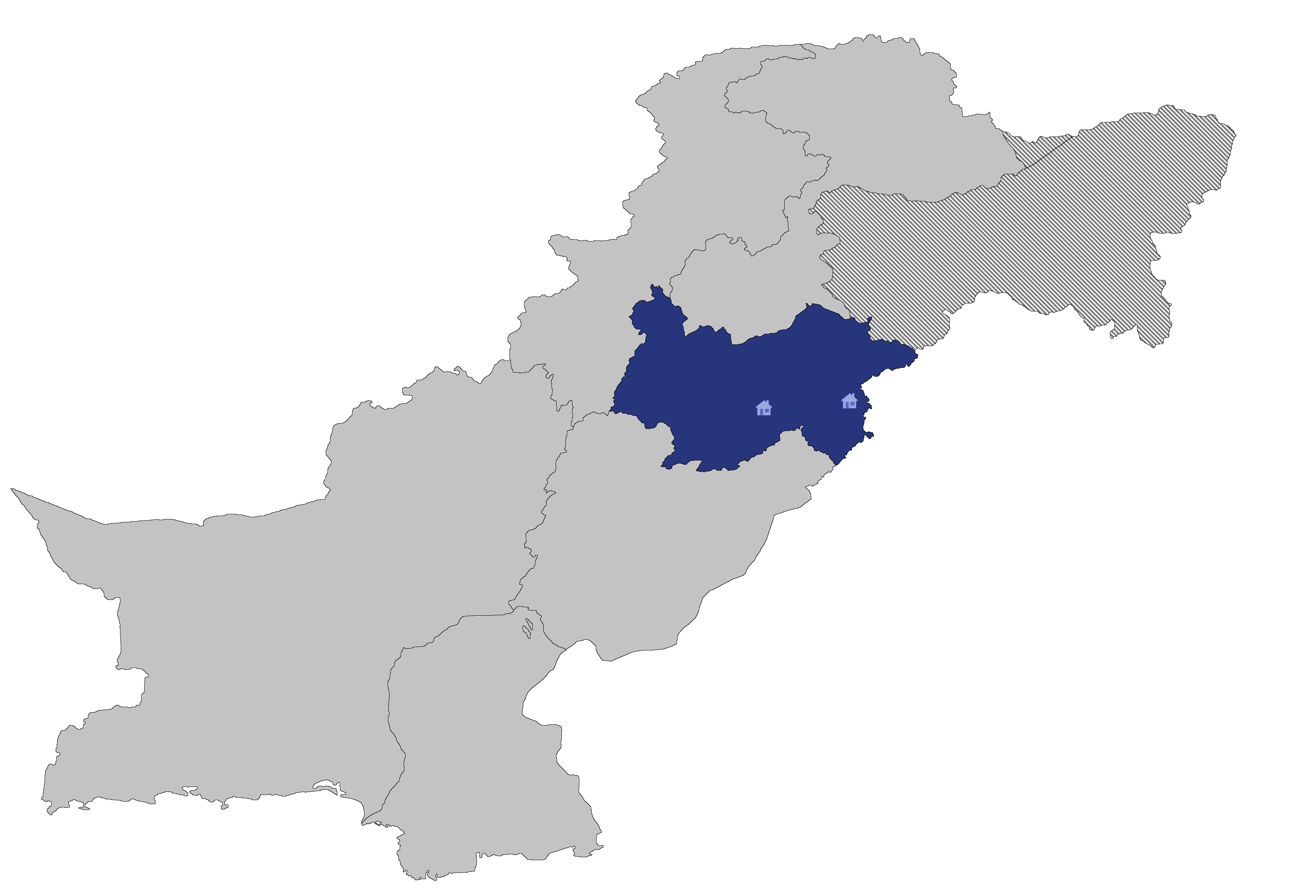
Central Punjab Cricket Association is made up of Faisalabad, Sialkot and Lahore

As of 2019 Pakistan was reorganised into six regional teams (on provincial lines). A three tier bottom-up system is in operation with the Tier 1 teams participating in the Quaid-e-Azam Trophy (First Class), Pakistan Cup (List A) and National T20 Cup (Regional T20). The Tier 2 teams participate in the City Cricket Association Tournament whilst the Tier 3 teams participate in various local tournaments as both tiers feed players to the Tier 1 team.

- Tier 1: Central Punjab
- Tier 2: Lahore (East), Lahore (West), Lahore (North), Gujranwala, Sheikhupura, Kasur, Sialkot, Narowal, Hafizabad, Gujrat, Mandi Bahauddin, Faisalabad, Sargodha, Mianwali, Jhang & Bhakkar.
- Tier 3: Various Clubs & Schools.

== See also ==
- Balochistan cricket team
- Khyber Pakhtunkhwa cricket team
- Northern cricket team
- Sindh cricket team
- Southern Punjab cricket team
- List of Central Punjab squads
