= Northern cricket team =

Pakistani first-class cricket team

Personnel
- Captain: Shadab Khan
- Owner: Northern Cricket Association

Team information
- Colors: Blue Red
- Founded: 2019; 6 years ago
- Dissolved: 2023; 2 years ago
- Home ground: Rawalpindi Cricket Stadium, Rawalpindi
- Secondary home ground(s): House of Northern Cricket Ground, Islamabad

History
- Quaid-e-Azam Trophy wins: 1 (2022/23)
- Pakistan Cup wins: 0
- National T20 Cup wins: 1 (2019/20)
First-class
List A / T20

Northern cricket team was a domestic cricket team in Pakistan representing Rawalpindi Division, Islamabad Capital Territory, Gilgit-Baltistan and Azad Jammu & Kashmir. It competed in domestic first-class, List A and T20 cricket competitions, namely the Quaid-e-Azam Trophy, Pakistan Cup and National T20 Cup. The team was operated by the Northern Cricket Association.

== History ==
The team was introduced as a part of the new domestic structure announced by the Pakistan Cricket Board (PCB) on 31 August 2019. On 3 September 2019, PCB confirmed the first squad of the team.

=== 2019/20 season ===
Northern were runners-up in the 2019–20 Quaid-e-Azam Trophy, and won the National T20 Cup, defeating Balochistan by 52 runs in the final. The Pakistan Cup was cancelled this season due to the COVID-19 pandemic.

=== 2020/21 season ===
Northern finished in fifth place in the Quaid-e-Azam Trophy, and lost in the semi-finals in both the Pakistan Cup and the National T20 Cup.

== Structure ==
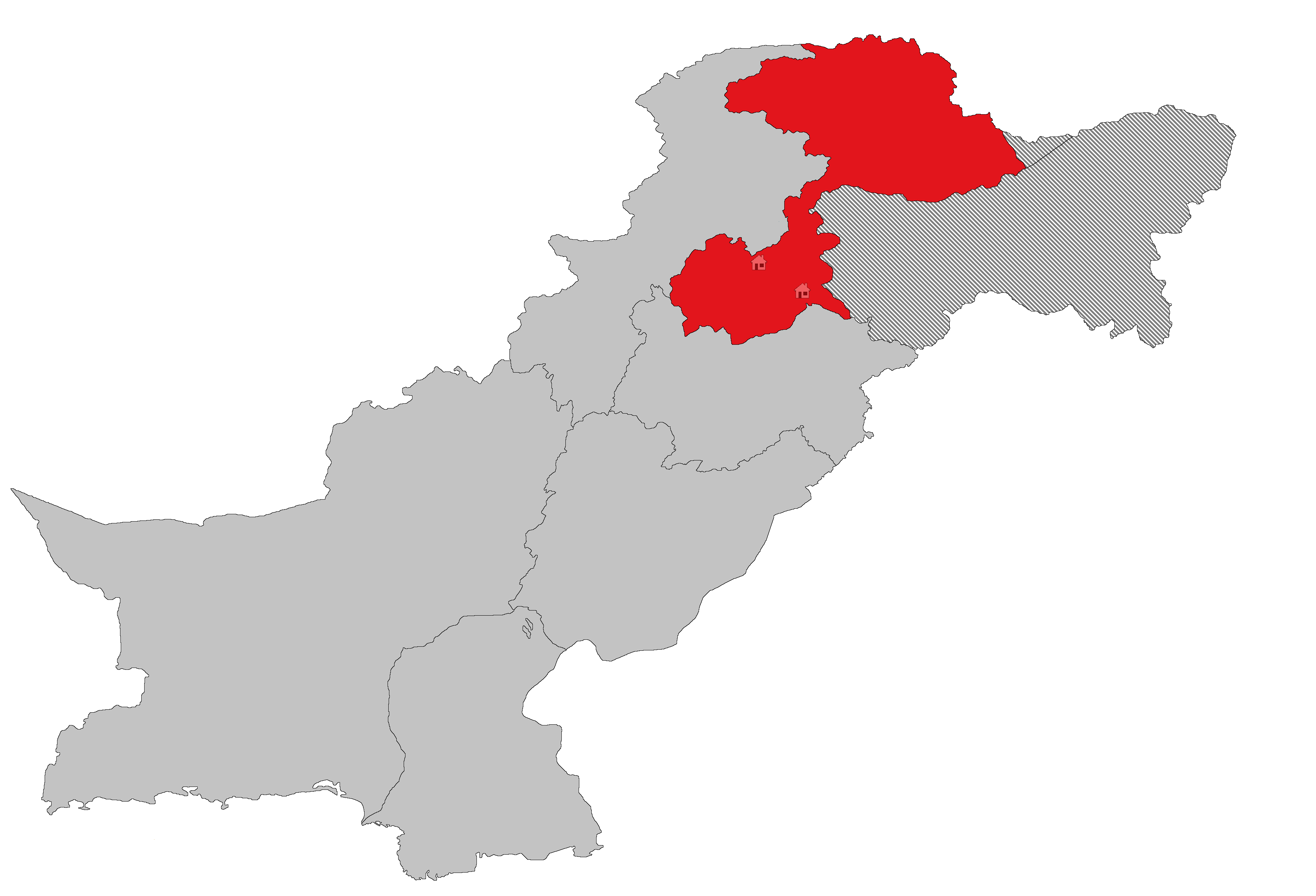
Northern Cricket Association comprises Islamabad, Rawalpindi and Azad Kashmir

As of 2019, domestic cricket in Pakistan was reorganised into six regional teams (on provincial lines).

A three tier bottom-up system is in operation with the Tier 1 teams participating in the Quaid-e-Azam Trophy (First Class), Pakistan Cup (List A) and National T20 Cup (Regional T20). The Tier 2 teams participate in the City Cricket Association Tournament whilst the Tier 3 teams participate in various local tournaments as both tiers feed players to the Tier 1 team.

- Tier 1: Northern
- Tier 2: Rawalpindi, Attock, Jhelum, Chakwal, Muzaffarabad, Kotli, Islamabad, Mirpur, Gilgit-Baltistan, Poonch & Bagh.
- Tier 3: Various clubs & schools.

== See also ==
- Balochistan cricket team
- Central Punjab cricket team
- Khyber Pakhtunkhwa cricket team
- Sindh cricket team
- Southern Punjab cricket team
