= Khyber Pakhtunkhwa cricket team =

Pakistani first-class cricket team

- د خیبر پښتونخوا کرکټ لوب‌‌‌‌‌‌ډله

Personnel
- Captain: Mohammad Rizwan
- Coach: Abdur Rehman
- Owner: Khyber Pakhtunkhwa Cricket Association

Team information
- Colors: Grey Black
- Founded: 2019; 7 years ago
- Dissolved: 2023; 3 years ago
- Home ground: Arbab Niaz Stadium, Peshawar
- Secondary home ground(s): Abbottabad Cricket Stadium, Abbottabad

History
- Quaid-e-Azam Trophy wins: 2 (2020/21 & 2021/22)
- Pakistan Cup wins: 1 (2020/21)
- National T20 Cup wins: 2 (2020/21 & 2021/22)
First-class
List A / T20

Khyber Pakhtunkhwa cricket team was a domestic cricket team in Pakistan representing the Khyber Pakhtunkhwa province. It competed in domestic first-class, List A and T20 cricket tournaments, namely the Quaid-e-Azam Trophy, Pakistan Cup and National T20 Cup. The team was operated by the Khyber Pakhtunkhwa Cricket Association.

== History ==
=== Before 2019 ===
As the North-West Frontier Province (NWFP), the team played its inaugural season in the Ranji Trophy in 1937. After the independence of Pakistan, NWFP competed in the Quaid-e-Azam Trophy sporadically from 1953–54 to 1978–79, and in the Pentangular Cup and Pakistan Cup. In 2010, the province was renamed "Khyber Pakhtunkhwa" and the team name changed accordingly. The team used Peshawar Club Ground as a home ground since 1938 until it was replaced by Arbab Niaz Stadium in 1985.

=== Since 2019 ===
A new Khyber Pakhtunkhwa team was introduced as a part of the new domestic structure announced by the Pakistan Cricket Board (PCB) on 31 August 2019.

==== Structure ====
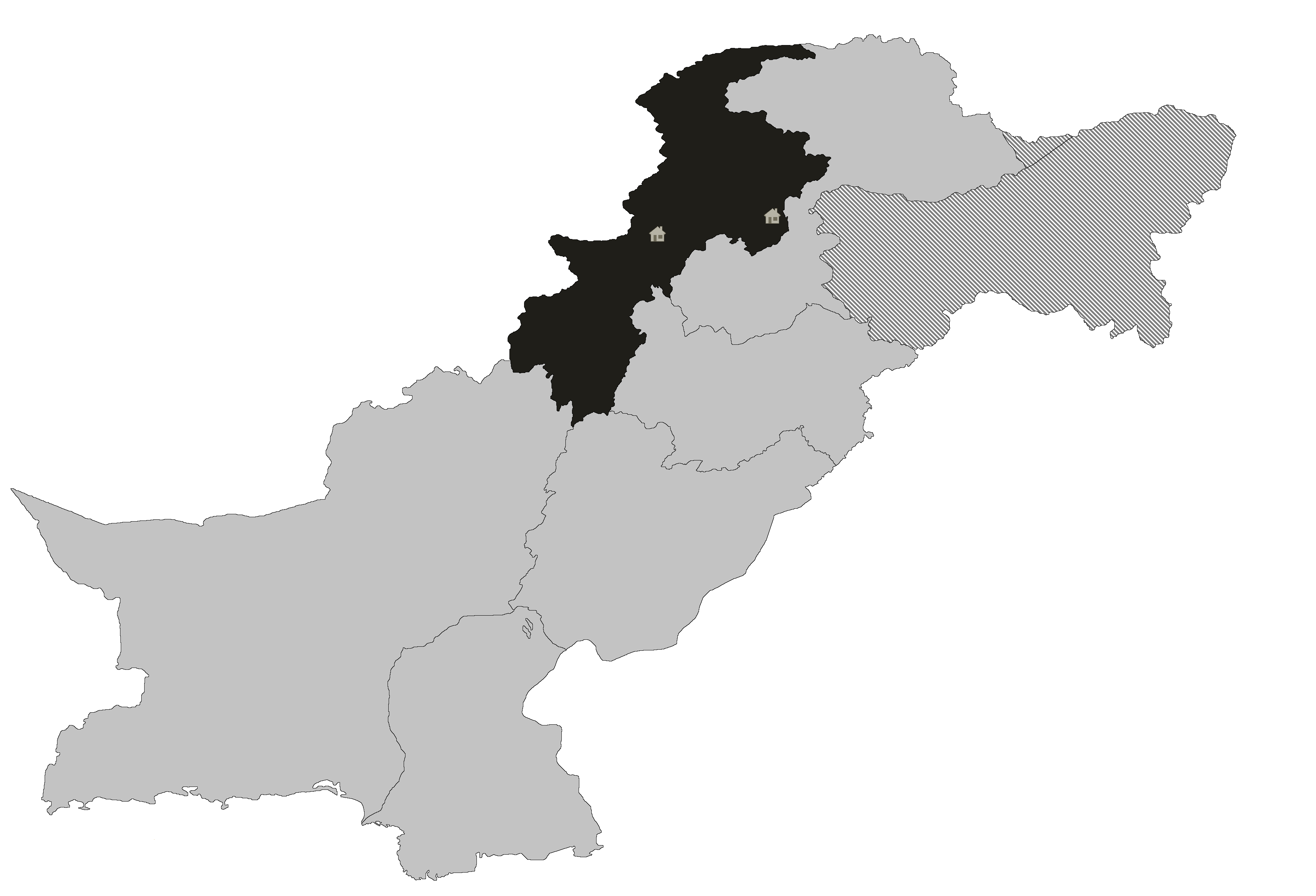
Khyber Pakhtunkhwa Cricket Association includes Peshawar, FATA and Abbottabad

In 2019, domestic cricket in Pakistan was reorganised into six regional teams (on provincial lines). A three tier bottom-up system is in operation with the Tier 1 teams participating in the Quaid-e-Azam Trophy (First Class), Pakistan Cup (List A) and National T20 Cup (Regional T20). The Tier 2 teams participate in the City Cricket Association Tournament whilst the Tier 3 teams participate in various local tournaments as both tiers feed players to the Tier 1 team.

- Tier 1: Khyber Pakhtunkhwa
- Tier 2: Peshawar, Nowshehra, Charsadda, Swat, Lower Dir, Mardan, Abbottabad, Mansehra, Haripur, Swabi, Upper Dir, Buner, Khyber, Mamond, Kohat, Kurram, D.I.Khan, Bannu & Mohmand.
- Tier 3: Various Clubs & Schools.

== Season summaries ==
=== 2019/20 season ===
Khyber Pakhtunkhwa finished in third and fourth place respectively in the Quaid-e-Azam Trophy and National T20 Cup. The Pakistan Cup was cancelled this season due to the COVID-19 pandemic.

=== 2020/21 season ===
The team won the treble being declared champions of the Quaid-e-Azam Trophy, Pakistan Cup and the National T20 Cup. The final against Central Punjab (Quaid-e-Azam Trophy) resulted in a tie, and they were declared joint winners.

=== 2021/22 season ===
Khyber Pakhtunkhwa won their second National T20 Cup by defeating Central Punjab in the final.
