= Pakistan at the Men's T20 World Cup =

History of Pakistan national team at T20 World Cup

The Pakistan national cricket team is one of the full members of the International Cricket Council (ICC). The team has qualified for all ten editions of the tournament, and were the champions of the second edition of the T20 World Cup in 2009, after defeating Sri Lanka in the final. Besides this victory, they have been the runners-up twice in 2007 and 2022, losing to India and England respectively. Pakistan have reached the semifinals in 2010, 2012 and 2021.

== T20 World Cup record ==
Key
Champions
Runners-up
Semi-finals
Host

T20 World Cup record
Year	Round	Position	GP	W	L	T+L	NR	Squad
(South Africa) 2007	Runners-up	2/12	7	5	1	1	0	Squad
(England) 2009	Champions	1/12	7	5	2	0	0	Squad
(Cricket West Indies) 2010	Semi-finals	4/12	6	2	4	0	0	Squad
(Sri Lanka) 2012	Semi-finals	4/12	6	4	2	0	0	Squad
(Bangladesh) 2014	Super 10	5/16	4	2	2	0	0	Squad
(India) 2016	Super 10	7/16	4	1	3	0	0	Squad
(United Arab Emirates) (Oman) 2021	Semi-finals	3/16	6	5	1	0	0	Squad
(Australia) 2022	Runners-up	2/16	7	4	3	0	0	Squad
(Cricket West Indies) (United States) 2024	Group Stage	11/20	4	2	1	1	0	Squad
(India) (Sri Lanka) 2026	Super 8	5/20	7	4	2	0	1	Squad
(Australia) (New Zealand) 2028	TBD							
(England) (Wales) (Republic of Ireland) (Scotland) 2030	TBD							
Total	10/10	1 Title	58	34	21	2	1	

== Record by opponents ==
Opponent	M	W	L	T+W	T+L	NR	Win %	First played
Afghanistan	1	1	0	0	0	0	100	2021
Australia	7	3	4	0	0	0	42.86	2007
Bangladesh	6	6	0	0	0	0	100	2007
Canada	1	1	0	0	0	0	100	2024
England	4	0	4	0	0	0	0.00	2009
India	9	1	7	0	1	0	11.11	2007
Ireland	2	2	0	0	0	0	100	2009
Namibia	2	2	0	0	0	0	100	2021
Netherlands	3	3	0	0	0	0	100	2009
New Zealand	8	5	2	0	0	1	62.5	2007
Scotland	2	2	0	0	0	0	100	2007
South Africa	4	4	0	0	0	0	100	2009
Sri Lanka	5	3	2	0	0	0	60	2007
United States	2	1	0	0	1	0	50.00	2026
West Indies	1	0	1	0	0	0	0.00	2014
Zimbabwe	1	0	1	0	0	0	0.00	2022
Total	58	34	21	0	2	1	58.62	—N/a
Source: Last Updated: 28 February 2026

== Tournament results ==
=== South Africa 2007 ===
Squad

- Shoaib Malik (c)
- Abdur Rehman
- Fawad Alam
- Iftikhar Anjum
- Kamran Akmal (wk)
- Misbah-ul-Haq
- Mohammad Asif
- Mohammad Hafeez
- Salman Butt
- Shahid Afridi
- Sohail Tanvir
- Umar Gul
- Yasir Arafat
- Younis Khan

Results

Group stage (Group D)			Super 8s (Group F)				Semifinal	Final	Overall Result
Opposition Result	Opposition Result	Rank	Opposition Result	Opposition Result	Opposition Result	Rank	Opposition Result	Opposition Result	Overall Result
Scotland; W by 51 runs	India; T+L by bowl-out	2	Sri Lanka; W by 33 runs	Australia; W by 6 wickets	Bangladesh; W by 4 wickets	1	New Zealand; W by 6 wickets	India; L by 5 runs	Runners-up

Scorecards

Group stage (Group D)

12 September
14:00
(scorecard)

Pakistan; 171/9 (20 overs)	v	Scotland; 120 (19.5 overs)
Younis Khan 41 (29); Craig Wright 3/29 (4 overs)		Fraser Watts 46 (35); Shahid Afridi 4/19 (4 overs)

Pakistan won by 51 runs
Kingsmead, Durban
Umpires: Steve Davis (Aus) and Simon Taufel (Aus)
Player of the match: Shahid Afridi (Pak)

- Scotland won the toss and elected to field.

14 September
18:00
(scorecard)

India; 141/9 (20 overs)	v	Pakistan; 141/7 (20 overs)
Robin Uthappa 50 (39); Mohammad Asif 4/18 (4 overs)		Misbah-ul-Haq 53 (35); Irfan Pathan 2/20 (4 overs)

Scores tied, India won 3-0 via bowl-out. (Ind X X X, Pak O O O)
Kingsmead, Durban
Umpires: Billy Doctrove (WI) and Simon Taufel (Aus)
Player of the match: Mohammad Asif (Pak)

- Pakistan won the toss and elected to field.
- After the scores were tied, the winner of the match was decided via a bowl out. India won the bowl out.

Super 8 (Group F)

17 September
18:00
(scorecard)

Pakistan; 189/6 (20 overs)	v	Sri Lanka; 156/9 (20 overs)
Shoaib Malik 57 (31); Lasith Malinga 3/43 (4 overs)		Chamara Silva 38 (27); Shahid Afridi 3/18 (4 overs)

Pakistan won by 33 runs
Wanderers Stadium, Johannesburg
Umpires: Daryl Harper (Aus) and Nigel Llong (Eng)
Player of the match: Younis Khan (Pak)

- Sri Lanka won the toss and elected to field.

18 September
14:00
(scorecard)

Australia; 164/7 (20 overs)	v	Pakistan; 165/4 (19.1 overs)
Michael Hussey 37 (25); Sohail Tanvir 3/31 (4 overs)		Misbah-ul-Haq 66* (42); Stuart Clark 3/27 (4 overs)

Pakistan won by 6 wickets
Wanderers Stadium, Johannesburg
Umpires: Mark Benson (Eng) and Nigel Llong (Eng)
Player of the match: Misbah-ul-Haq (Pak)

- Pakistan won the toss and elected to field.

20 September
14:00
(scorecard)

Bangladesh; 140 (19.4 overs)	v	Pakistan; 141/6 (19 overs)
Junaid Siddique 71 (49); Shoaib Malik 2/15 (2 overs)		Shahid Afridi 39 (15); Abdur Razzak 2/16 (4 overs)

Pakistan won by 4 wickets
Newlands Cricket Ground, Cape Town
Umpires: Ian Howell (SA) and Tony Hill (NZ)
Player of the match: Junaid Siddique (Ban)

- Pakistan won the toss and elected to field.

Knockout stage

Semi-final 1
22 September
13:00
Scorecard

New Zealand; 143/8 (20 overs)	v	Pakistan; 147/4 (18.5 overs)
Ross Taylor 37* (23); Umar Gul 3/15 (4 overs)		Imran Nazir 59 (41); Scott Styris 1/14 (3 overs)

Pakistan won by 6 wickets
Newlands Cricket Ground, Cape Town
Attendance: 18,734
Umpires: Daryl Harper (Aus) and Simon Taufel (Aus)
Player of the match: Umar Gul (Pak)

- New Zealand won the toss and elected to bat.

Final
24 September 2007
14:00
Scorecard

India; 157/5 (20 overs)	v	Pakistan; 152 (19.3 overs)
Gautam Gambhir 75 (54); Umar Gul 3/28 (4 overs)		Misbah-ul-Haq 43 (38); Irfan Pathan 3/16 (4 overs)

India won by 5 runs
Wanderers Stadium, Johannesburg
Attendance: 32,217
Umpires: Mark Benson (Eng) and Simon Taufel (Aus)
Player of the match: Irfan Pathan (Ind)

- India won the toss and elected to bat.

=== England 2009 ===
Squad

- Younis Khan (c)
- Ahmed Shehzad
- Fawad Alam
- Iftikhar Anjum
- Kamran Akmal (wk)
- Misbah-ul-Haq
- Mohammad Amir
- Saeed Ajmal
- Salman Butt
- Shahid Afridi
- Shoaib Malik
- Shahzaib Hasan
- Sohail Tanvir
- Umar Gul
- Yasir Arafat
- Abdul Razzaq

Results

Event	Group stage (Group B)			Super 8s (Group F)				Semifinal	Final	Overall Result
Event	Opposition Result	Opposition Result	Rank	Opposition Result	Opposition Result	Opposition Result	Rank	Opposition Result	Opposition Result	Overall Result
2009	England; L by 48 runs	Netherlands; W by 82 runs	2	Sri Lanka; L by 19 runs	New Zealand; W by 6 wickets	Ireland; W by 39 runs	2	South Africa; W by 7 runs	Sri Lanka; W by 8 wickets	Winners

Scorecards

Group stage (Group B)

7 June 2009
18:30 (D/N)
Scorecard

England; 185/5 (20 overs)	v	Pakistan; 137/7 (20 overs)
Kevin Pietersen 58 (38); Saeed Ajmal 2/23 (4 overs)		Younis Khan 46* (31); Stuart Broad 3/17 (3 overs)

England won by 48 runs
The Oval, London
Umpires: Billy Doctrove (WI) and Daryl Harper (Aus)
Player of the match: Luke Wright (Eng)

- Pakistan won the toss and elected to field.

9 June 2009
13:30
Scorecard

Pakistan; 175/5 (20 overs)	v	Netherlands; 93 (17.3 overs)
Kamran Akmal 41 (30); Pieter Seelaar 2/36 (4 overs)		Alexei Kervezee 21 (29); Shahid Afridi 4/11 (4 overs)

Pakistan won by 82 runs
Lord's, London
Umpires: Billy Doctrove (WI) and Amiesh Saheba (Ind)
Player of the match: Kamran Akmal (Pak)

- Pakistan won the toss and elected to bat.
- Pakistan go through to the Super 8 stage as a result of this match.

Super 8 (Group F)

12 June 2009
13:30
Scorecard

Sri Lanka; 150/7 (20 overs)	v	Pakistan; 131/9 (20 overs)
Tillakaratne Dilshan 46 (39); Saeed Ajmal 2/26 (4 overs)		Younis Khan 50 (37); Lasith Malinga 3/17 (4 overs)

Sri Lanka won by 19 runs
Lord's, London
Umpires: Mark Benson (Eng) and Rudi Koertzen (SA)
Player of the match: Tillakaratne Dilshan (SL)

- Sri Lanka won the toss and elected to bat

13 June 2009
17:30 (D/N)
Scorecard

New Zealand; 99 (18.3 overs)	v	Pakistan; 100/4 (13.1 overs)
Scott Styris 22 (29); Umar Gul 5/6 (3 overs)		Shahzaib Hasan 35 (28); Daniel Vettori 2/20 (4 overs)

Pakistan won by 6 wickets
The Oval, London
Umpires: Mark Benson (Eng) and Rod Tucker (Aus)
Player of the match: Umar Gul (Pak)

- New Zealand won the toss and elected to bat.
- Umar Gul became the first bowler to take five wickets in a Twenty20 international.

15 June 2009
13:30
Scorecard

Pakistan; 159/5 (20 overs)	v	Ireland; 120/9 (20 overs)
Kamran Akmal 57 (51); Kyle McCallan 2/26 (4 overs)		William Porterfield 40 (36); Saeed Ajmal 4/19 (4 overs)

Pakistan won by 39 runs
The Oval, London
Umpires: Rudi Koertzen (SA) and Rod Tucker (Aus)
Player of the match: Kamran Akmal (Pak)

- Pakistan won the toss and elected to bat.
- Pakistan qualified for the semi-finals as a result of this match.

Knockout stage

Semi-final 1
18 June 2009
17:30 (D/N)
Scorecard

Pakistan; 149/4 (20 overs)	v	South Africa; 142/5 (20 overs)
Shahid Afridi 51 (34); JP Duminy 1/14 (2 overs)		Jacques Kallis 64 (54); Shahid Afridi 2/16 (4 overs)

Pakistan won by 7 runs
Trent Bridge, Nottingham
Umpires: Billy Bowden (NZ) and Steve Davis (Aus)
Player of the match: Shahid Afridi (Pak)

- Pakistan won the toss and elected to bat.

Final
21 June 2009
15:00
Scorecard

Sri Lanka; 138/6 (20 overs)	v	Pakistan; 139/2 (18.4 overs)
Kumar Sangakkara 64* (52); Abdul Razzaq 3/20 (3 overs)		Shahid Afridi 54* (40); Sanath Jayasuriya 1/8 (2 overs)

Pakistan won by 8 wickets
Lord's, London
Umpires: Daryl Harper (Aus) and Simon Taufel (Aus)
Player of the match: Shahid Afridi (Pak)

- Sri Lanka won the toss and elected to bat.

=== West Indies 2010 ===
Squad

- Shahid Afridi (c)
- Abdul Razzaq
- Hammad Azam
- Fawad Alam
- Iftikhar Anjum
- Kamran Akmal (wk)
- Khalid Latif
- Misbah-ul-Haq
- Mohammad Amir
- Mohammad Asif
- Mohammad Hafeez
- Saeed Ajmal
- Salman Butt
- Umar Akmal
- Mohammad Sami
- Abdur Rehman

Results

Event	Group stage (Group A)			Super 8s (Group E)				Semifinal	Overall Result
Event	Opposition Result	Opposition Result	Rank	Opposition Result	Opposition Result	Opposition Result	Rank	Opposition Result	Overall Result
2010	Bangladesh; W by 21 runs	Australia; L by 34 runs	2	England; L by 6 wickets	New Zealand; L by 1 run	South Africa; W by 11 runs	2	Australia; L by 3 wickets	Semifinals

Scorecards

Group stage (Group A)

1 May
13:30
Scorecard

Pakistan; 172/3 (20 overs)	v	Bangladesh; 151/7 (20 overs)
Salman Butt 73 (46); Shakib Al Hasan 2/27 (4 overs)		Mohammad Ashraful 65 (49); Mohammad Sami 3/29 (4 overs)

Pakistan won by 21 runs
Beausejour Stadium, Gros Islet
Umpires: Asoka de Silva (SL) and Rod Tucker (Aus)
Player of the match: Salman Butt (Pak)

- Pakistan won the toss and elected to bat.

2 May
13:30
Scorecard

Australia; 191 (20 overs)	v	Pakistan; 157 (20 overs)
Shane Watson 81 (49); Mohammad Amir 3/23 (4 overs)		Misbah-ul-Haq 41 (31); Shaun Tait 3/20 (4 overs)

Australia won by 34 runs
Beausejour Stadium, Gros Islet
Umpires: Asoka de Silva (SL) and Shavir Tarapore (Ind)
Player of the match: Shane Watson (Aus)

- Australia won the toss and elected to bat.
- Five wickets fell in the final over of Australia's innings. Mohammad Amir bowled a triple-wicket maiden and there were two run-outs.

Super 8 (Group E)

6 May
09:30
Scorecard

Pakistan; 147/9 (20 overs)	v	England; 151/4 (19.3 overs)
Salman Butt 34 (26); Michael Yardy 2/19 (4 overs)		Kevin Pietersen 73* (52); Saeed Ajmal 2/18 (3.3 overs)

England won by 6 wickets
Kensington Oval, Bridgetown
Umpires: Billy Bowden (NZ) and Rudi Koertzen (SA)
Player of the match: Kevin Pietersen (Eng)

- England won the toss and elected to field.

8 May
09:30
Scorecard

New Zealand; 133/7 (20 overs)	v	Pakistan; 132/7 (20 overs)
Daniel Vettori 38 (34); Abdur Rehman 2/19 (3 overs)		Salman Butt 67* (54); Ian Butler 3/19 (4 overs)

New Zealand won by 1 run
Kensington Oval, Bridgetown
Umpires: Billy Doctrove (WI) and Ian Gould (Eng)
Player of the match: Ian Butler (NZ)

- Pakistan won the toss and elected to field.

10 May
09:30
Scorecard

Pakistan; 148/7 (20 overs)	v	South Africa; 137/7 (20 overs)
Umar Akmal 51 (33); Charl Langeveldt 4/19 (4 overs)		AB de Villiers 53 (41); Saeed Ajmal 4/26 (4 overs)

Pakistan won by 11 runs
Beausejour Stadium, Gros Islet
Umpires: Billy Doctrove (WI) and Ian Gould (Eng)
Player of the match: Umar Akmal (Pak)

- Pakistan won the toss and elected to bat.

Knockout stage

Semi-final 2
14 May
11:30
Scorecard

Pakistan; 191/6 (20 overs)	v	Australia; 197/7 (19.5 overs)
Umar Akmal 56* (35); Steve Smith 1/23 (2 overs)		Michael Hussey 60* (24); Mohammad Amir 3/35 (4 overs)

Australia won by 3 wickets
Beausejour Stadium, Gros Islet
Umpires: Billy Doctrove (WI) and Ian Gould (Eng)
Player of the match: Michael Hussey (Aus)

- Australia won the toss and elected to field.

=== Sri Lanka 2012 ===
Squad

- Mohammad Hafeez (c)
- Shahid Afridi
- Saeed Ajmal
- Kamran Akmal (wk)
- Umar Akmal
- Yasir Arafat
- Umar Gul
- Raza Hasan
- Nasir Jamshed
- Shoaib Malik
- Imran Nazir
- Mohammad Sami
- Abdul Razzaq
- Asad Shafiq
- Sohail Tanvir

Results

Event	Group stage (Group D)			Super 8s (Group F)				Semifinal	Overall Result
Event	Opposition Result	Opposition Result	Rank	Opposition Result	Opposition Result	Opposition Result	Rank	Opposition Result	Overall Result
2012	New Zealand; W by 13 runs	Bangladesh; W by 8 wickets	1	South Africa; W by 2 wickets	India; L by 8 wickets	Australia; W by 32 runs	2	Sri Lanka; L by 16 runs	Semifinals

Scorecards

Group stage (Group D)

23 September
15:30 (D/N)
Scorecard

Pakistan; 177/6 (20 overs)	v	New Zealand; 164/9 (20 overs)
Nasir Jamshed 56 (35); Tim Southee 2/31 (4 overs)		Rob Nicol 33 (28); Saeed Ajmal 4/30 (4 overs)

Pakistan won by 13 runs
Pallekele International Cricket Stadium, Pallekele
Umpires: Marais Erasmus (SA) and Bruce Oxenford (Aus)
Player of the match: Nasir Jamshed (Pakistan)

- Pakistan won the toss and elected to bat

25 September
19:30 (D/N)
Scorecard

Bangladesh; 175/6 (20 overs)	v	Pakistan; 178/2 (18.4 overs)
Shakib Al Hasan 84 (54); Yasir Arafat 3/25 (3 overs)		Imran Nazir 72 (36); Abul Hasan 2/33 (3 overs)

Pakistan won by 8 wickets
Pallekele International Cricket Stadium, Pallekele
Umpires: Steve Davis (Aus) and Ian Gould (Eng)
Player of the match: Imran Nazir (Pakistan)

- Bangladesh won the toss and elected to bat
- Pakistan qualified for the Super 8 as a result of this match
- This was the highest successful chase by Pakistan in Twenty20 Internationals

Super 8 (Group F)

28 September
15:30 (D/N)
Scorecard

South Africa; 133/6 (20 overs)	v	Pakistan; 136/8 (19.4 overs)
JP Duminy 48 (38); Mohammad Hafeez 2/23 (4 overs)		Umar Akmal 43* (41); Dale Steyn 3/22 (4 overs)

Pakistan won by 2 wickets
R. Premadasa Stadium, Colombo
Umpires: Ian Gould (Eng) and Rod Tucker (Aus)
Player of the match: Umar Gul (Pak)

- South Africa won the toss and elected to bat

30 September
19:30 (D/N)
Scorecard

Pakistan; 128 (19.4 overs)	v	India; 129/2 (17 overs)
Shoaib Malik 28 (22); Lakshmipathy Balaji 3/22 (3.4 overs)		Virat Kohli 78* (61); Raza Hasan 1/22 (4 overs)

India won by 8 wickets
R. Premadasa Stadium, Colombo
Umpires: Richard Kettleborough (Eng) and Rod Tucker (Aus)
Player of the match: Virat Kohli (Ind)

- Pakistan won the toss and elected to bat

2 October
15:30 (D/N)
Scorecard

Pakistan; 149/6 (20 overs)	v	Australia; 117/7 (20 overs)
Nasir Jamshed 55 (46); Mitchell Starc 3/20 (4 overs)		Michael Hussey 54* (47); Saeed Ajmal 3/17 (4 overs)

Pakistan won by 32 runs
R. Premadasa Stadium, Colombo
Umpires: Ian Gould (Eng) and Richard Kettleborough (Eng)
Player of the match: Raza Hasan (Pak)

- Australia won the toss and elected to field

Knockout stage

Semi-final 1
4 October
19:00 (D/N)
Scorecard

Sri Lanka; 139/4 (20 overs)	v	Pakistan; 123/7 (20 overs)
Mahela Jayawardene 42 (36); Mohammed Hafeez 1/12 (2 overs)		Mohammed Hafeez 42 (40); Rangana Herath 3/25 (4 overs)

Sri Lanka won by 16 runs
R. Premadasa Stadium, Colombo
Attendance : 35,000
Umpires: Simon Taufel (Aus) and Rod Tucker (Aus)
Player of the match: Mahela Jayawardene (SL)

- Sri Lanka won the toss and elected to bat

=== Bangladesh 2014 ===
Squad

- Mohammad Hafeez (c)
- Shahid Afridi
- Saeed Ajmal
- Kamran Akmal (wk)
- Umar Akmal
- Bilawal Bhatti
- Zulfiqar Babar
- Umar Gul
- Sharjeel Khan
- Junaid Khan
- Shoaib Malik
- Sohaib Maqsood
- Ahmed Shehzad
- Mohammad Talha
- Sohail Tanvir

Results

Event	Super 10 (Group 2)					Overall Result
Event	Opposition Result	Opposition Result	Opposition Result	Opposition Result	Rank	Overall Result
2014	India; L by 7 wickets	Australia; W by 16 runs	Bangladesh; W by 50 runs	West Indies; L by 84 runs	3	Super 10

Scorecards

Super 10 (Group 2)

21 March
19:30 (D/N)
Scorecard

Pakistan; 130/7 (20 overs)	v	India; 131/3 (18.3 overs)
Umar Akmal 33 (30); Amit Mishra 2/22 (4 overs)		Virat Kohli 36* (32); Bilawal Bhatti 1/17 (2 overs)

India won by 7 wickets
Sher-e-Bangla National Cricket Stadium, Dhaka
Umpires: Kumar Dharmasena (SL) and Richard Kettleborough (Eng)
Player of the match: Amit Mishra (Ind)

- India won the toss and elected to field.

23 March
15:30
Scorecard

Pakistan; 191/5 (20 overs)	v	Australia; 175 (20 overs)
Umar Akmal 94 (54); Nathan Coulter-Nile 2/36(4 overs)		Glenn Maxwell 74 (33); Zulfiqar Babar 2/26 (4 overs)

Pakistan won by 16 runs
Sher-e-Bangla National Cricket Stadium, Dhaka
Umpires: Richard Kettleborough (Eng) and Nigel Llong (Eng)
Player of the match: Umar Akmal (Pak)

- Australia won the toss and elected to field.

30 March
15:30
Scorecard

Pakistan; 190/5 (20 overs)	v	Bangladesh; 140/7 (20 overs)
Ahmed Shehzad 111*(62); Abdur Razzak 2/20 (4 overs)		Shakib Al Hasan 38 (32); Umar Gul 3/30 (4 overs)

Pakistan won by 50 runs
Sher-e-Bangla National Cricket Stadium, Dhaka
Umpires: Ian Gould (Eng) and Richard Kettleborough (Eng)
Player of the match: Ahmed Shehzad (Pak)

- Pakistan won the toss and elected to bat
- Ahmed Shehzad became the first Pakistani batsmen to score a century in Twenty20 Internationals.

1 April
19:30 (D/N)
Scorecard

West Indies; 166/6 (20 overs)	v	Pakistan; 82 (17.5 overs)
Dwayne Bravo 46 (26); Mohammad Hafeez 1/15 (2 overs)		Mohammad Hafeez 19 (32); Samuel Badree 3/10 (4 overs)

West Indies won by 84 runs
Sher-e-Bangla National Cricket Stadium, Dhaka
Umpires: Ian Gould (Eng) and Richard Kettleborough (Eng)
Player of the match: Dwayne Bravo (WI)

- West Indies won the toss and elected to bat

=== India 2016 ===
Squad

- Shahid Afridi (c)
- Sarfraz Ahmed (vc, wk)
- Anwar Ali
- Umar Akmal
- Mohammad Amir
- Mohammad Hafeez
- Mohammad Irfan
- Sharjeel Khan
- Khalid Latif
- Shoaib Malik
- Mohammad Nawaz
- Wahab Riaz
- Ahmed Shehzad
- Mohammad Sami
- Imad Wasim

Results

Event	Super 10 (Group 2)					Overall Result
Event	Opposition Result	Opposition Result	Opposition Result	Opposition Result	Rank	Overall Result
2016	Bangladesh; W by 55 runs	India; L by 6 wickets	New Zealand; L by 22 runs	Australia; L by 21 runs	4	Super 10

Scorecards

Super 10 (Group 2)

16 March
15:00 (D/N)
Scorecard

Pakistan; 201/5 (20 overs)	v	Bangladesh; 146/6 (20 overs)
Mohammad Hafeez 64 (42); Taskin Ahmed 2/32 (4 overs)		Shakib Al Hasan 50* (40); Shahid Afridi 2/27 (4 overs)

Pakistan won by 55 runs
Eden Gardens, Kolkata
Umpires: Ian Gould (Eng) and Richard Kettleborough (Eng)
Player of the match: Shahid Afridi (Pak)

- Pakistan won the toss and elected to bat.

19 March
19:30 (D/N)
Scorecard

Pakistan; 118/5 (18 overs)	v	India; 119/4 (15.5 overs)
Shoaib Malik 26 (16); Suresh Raina 1/4 (1 over)		Virat Kohli 55* (37); Mohammad Sami 2/17 (2 overs)

India won by 6 wickets
Eden Gardens, Kolkata
Umpires: Ian Gould (Eng) and Richard Kettleborough (Eng)
Player of the match: Virat Kohli (Ind)

- India won the toss and elected to field.
- The start of the match was delayed by a wet outfield and the game was reduced to 18 overs per side.
- Ahmed Shehzad became the fifth player for Pakistan to pass 1,000 runs in T20Is.

22 March
19:30 (D/N)
Scorecard

New Zealand; 180/5 (20 overs)	v	Pakistan; 158/5 (20 overs)
Martin Guptill 80 (48); Mohammad Sami 2/23 (4 overs)		Sharjeel Khan 47 (25); Adam Milne 2/25 (4 overs)

New Zealand won by 22 runs
I. S. Bindra Stadium, Mohali
Umpires: Richard Illingworth (Eng) and Nigel Llong (Eng)
Player of the match: Martin Guptill (NZ)

- New Zealand won the toss and elected to bat.
- Shahid Afridi (Pak) became the leading wicket-taker in World Twenty20 matches (39).

25 March
15:00 (D/N)
Scorecard

Australia; 193/4 (20 overs)	v	Pakistan; 172/8 (20 overs)
Steve Smith 61* (43); Imad Wasim 2/31 (4 overs)		Khalid Latif 46 (41); James Faulkner 5/28 (4 overs)

Australia won by 21 runs
I. S. Bindra Stadium, Mohali
Umpires: Kumar Dharmasena (SL) and Marais Erasmus (SA)
Player of the match: James Faulkner (Aus)

- Australia won the toss and elected to bat.
- Pakistan were eliminated as a result of this match.

=== Oman & UAE 2021 ===
Squad and kit

- Babar Azam (c)
- Shadab Khan (vc)
- Sarfaraz Ahmed (wk)
- Shaheen Afridi
- Asif Ali
- Hasan Ali
- Haider Ali
- Mohammad Hafeez
- Shoaib Malik
- Mohammad Nawaz
- Haris Rauf
- Mohammad Rizwan (wk)
- Mohammad Wasim Jr.
- Imad Wasim
- Fakhar Zaman

2021 kit

Results

Event	Super 12 (Group 2)						Semifinal	Overall Result
Event	Opposition Result	Opposition Result	Opposition Result	Opposition Result	Opposition Result	Rank	Opposition Result	Overall Result
2021	India; W by 10 wickets	New Zealand; W by 5 wickets	Afghanistan; W by 5 wickets	Namibia; W by 45 runs	Scotland; W by 72 runs	1	Australia; L by 5 wickets	Semifinals

Scorecards

Super 12 (Group 2)

24 October 2021
18:00 (N)
Scorecard

India; 151/7 (20 overs)	v	Pakistan; 152/0 (17.5 overs)
Virat Kohli 57 (49); Shaheen Afridi 3/31 (4 overs)		Mohammad Rizwan 79* (55)

Pakistan won by 10 wickets
Dubai International Cricket Stadium, Dubai
Umpires: Marais Erasmus (SA) and Chris Gaffaney (NZ)
Player of the match: Shaheen Afridi (Pak)

- Pakistan won the toss and elected to field.
- This was the 200th international cricket match between India and Pakistan.
- This was the first time in 13 attempts that Pakistan had beaten India in either a Cricket World Cup or T20 World Cup match.

26 October 2021
18:00 (N)
Scorecard

New Zealand; 134/8 (20 overs)	v	Pakistan; 135/5 (18.4 overs)
Daryl Mitchell 27 (20); Haris Rauf 4/22 (4 overs)		Mohammad Rizwan 33 (34); Ish Sodhi 2/28 (4 overs)

Pakistan won by 5 wickets
Sharjah Cricket Stadium, Sharjah
Umpires: Michael Gough and Richard Kettleborough (Eng)
Player of the match: Haris Rauf (Pak)

- Pakistan won the toss and elected to field.

29 October 2021
18:00 (N)
Scorecard

Afghanistan; 147/6 (20 overs)	v	Pakistan; 148/5 (19 overs)
Gulbadin Naib 35* (25); Imad Wasim 2/25 (4 overs)		Babar Azam 51 (47); Rashid Khan 2/26 (4 overs)

Pakistan won by 5 wickets
Dubai International Cricket Stadium, Dubai
Umpires: Chris Brown (NZ) and Joel Wilson (WI)
Player of the match: Asif Ali (Pak)

- Afghanistan won the toss and elected to bat.
- Babar Azam (Pak) became the fastest player, in terms of innings, to score 1,000 runs as captain in T20Is (26).

2 November 2021
18:00 (N)
Scorecard

Pakistan; 189/2 (20 overs)	v	Namibia; 144/5 (20 overs)
Mohammad Rizwan 79* (50); David Wiese 1/30 (4 overs)		David Wiese 43* (31); Imad Wasim 1/13 (3 overs)

Pakistan won by 45 runs
Sheikh Zayed Cricket Stadium, Abu Dhabi
Umpires: Chris Brown (NZ) and Chris Gaffaney (NZ)
Player of the match: Mohammad Rizwan (Pak)

- Pakistan won the toss and elected to bat.
- Pakistan qualified for the semi-finals as a result of this match.

5 November 2021
18:00 (N)
Scorecard

Scotland; 85 (17.4 overs)	v	India; 89/2 (6.3 overs)
George Munsey 24 (19); Mohammed Shami 3/15 (3 overs)		KL Rahul 50 (19); Mark Watt 1/20 (2 overs)

India won by 8 wickets
Dubai International Cricket Stadium, Dubai
Umpires: Marais Erasmus (SA) and Rod Tucker (Aus)
Player of the match: Ravindra Jadeja (Ind)

- India won the toss and elected to field.
- KL Rahul (Ind) scored the joint-fastest fifty of the tournament (18 balls).

Knockout stage

Semi-final 2'
11 November 2021
18:00 (N)
Scorecard

Pakistan; 176/4 (20 overs)	v	Australia; 177/5 (19 overs)
Mohammad Rizwan 67 (52); Mitchell Starc 2/38 (4 overs)		David Warner 49 (30); Shadab Khan 4/26 (4 overs)

Australia won by 5 wickets
Dubai International Cricket Stadium, Dubai
Umpires: Chris Gaffaney (NZ) and Richard Kettleborough (Eng)
Player of the match: Matthew Wade (Aus)

- Australia won the toss and elected to field.

=== Australia 2022 ===
Squad and kit

- Babar Azam (c)
- Shadab Khan (vc)
- Sarfaraz Ahmed (wk)
- Shaheen Afridi
- Iftikhar Ahmed
- Asif Ali
- Haider Ali
- Mohammad Haris
- Mohammad Hasnain
- Shan Masood
- Mohammad Nawaz
- Haris Rauf
- Mohammad Rizwan (wk)
- Khushdil Shah
- Naseem Shah
- Mohammad Wasim

2022 kit

Results

Event	Super 12 (Group 2)						Semifinal	Final	Overall Result
Event	Opposition Result	Opposition Result	Opposition Result	Opposition Result	Opposition Result	Rank	Opposition Result	Opposition Result	Overall Result
2022	India; L by 4 wickets	Zimbabwe; L by 1 run	Netherlands; W by 6 wickets	South Africa; W by 33 runs (DLS)	Bangladesh; W by 5 wickets	2	New Zealand; W by 7 wickets	England; L by 5 wickets	Runners-up

Scorecards

Super 12 (Group 2)

23 October 2022
19:00 (N)
Scorecard

Pakistan; 159/8 (20 overs)	v	India; 160/6 (20 overs)
Shan Masood 52* (42); Hardik Pandya 3/30 (4 overs)		Virat Kohli 82* (53); Haris Rauf 2/36 (4 overs)

India won by 4 wickets
Melbourne Cricket Ground, Melbourne
Umpires: Marais Erasmus (SA) and Rod Tucker (Aus)
Player of the match: Virat Kohli (Ind)

- India won the toss and elected to field.

27 October 2022
19:00 (N)
Scorecard

Zimbabwe; 130/8 (20 overs)	v	Pakistan; 129/8 (20 overs)
Sean Williams 31 (28); Mohammad Wasim 4/24 (4 overs)		Shan Masood 44 (38); Sikandar Raza 3/25 (4 overs)

Zimbabwe won by 1 run
Perth Stadium, Perth
Umpires: Chris Gaffaney (NZ) and Richard Kettleborough (Eng)
Player of the match: Sikandar Raza (Zim)

- Zimbabwe won the toss and elected to bat.
- This was Zimbabwe's first win over Pakistan in an ICC Tournament.

30 October 2022
15:00
Scorecard

Netherlands; 91/9 (20 overs)	v	Pakistan; 95/4 (13.5 overs)
Colin Ackermann 27 (27); Shadab Khan 3/22 (4 overs)		Mohammad Rizwan 49 (39); Brandon Glover 2/22 (2.5 overs)

Pakistan won by 6 wickets
Perth Stadium, Perth
Umpires: Richard Illingworth (Eng) and Paul Reiffel (Aus)
Player of the match: Shadab Khan (Pak)

- Netherlands won the toss and elected to bat.
- This was Pakistan's maiden T20I win in Australia.

3 November 2022
19:00 (N)
Scorecard

Pakistan; 185/9 (20 overs)	v	South Africa; 108/9 (14 overs)
Shadab Khan 52 (22); Anrich Nortje 4/41 (4 overs)		Temba Bavuma 36 (19); Shaheen Afridi 3/14 (3 overs)

Pakistan won by 33 runs (DLS method)
Sydney Cricket Ground, Sydney
Umpires: Chris Gaffaney (NZ) and Paul Reiffel (Aus)
Player of the match: Shadab Khan (Pak)

- Pakistan won the toss and elected to bat.
- South Africa were set a revised target of 142 runs in 14 overs due to rain.

6 November 2022
14:30
Scorecard

Bangladesh; 127/8 (20 overs)	v	Pakistan; 128/5 (18.1 overs)
Najmul Hossain Shanto 54 (48); Shaheen Afridi 4/22 (4 overs)		Mohammad Rizwan 32 (32); Nasum Ahmed 1/14 (4 overs)

Pakistan won by 5 wickets
Adelaide Oval, Adelaide
Umpires: Adrian Holdstock (SA) and Joel Wilson (WI)
Player of the match: Shaheen Afridi (Pak)

- Bangladesh won the toss and elected to bat.
- Pakistan qualified for the semi-finals as a result of this match.

Knockout stage

Semi-final 1
9 November 2022
19:00 (N)
Scorecard

New Zealand; 152/4 (20 overs)	v	Pakistan; 153/3 (19.1 overs)
Daryl Mitchell 53* (35); Shaheen Afridi 2/24 (4 overs)		Mohammad Rizwan 57 (43); Trent Boult 2/33 (4 overs)

Pakistan won by 7 wickets
Sydney Cricket Ground, Sydney
Attendance: 36,443
Umpires: Marais Erasmus (SA) and Richard Illingworth (Eng)
Player of the match: Mohammad Rizwan (Pak)

- New Zealand won the toss and elected to bat.
- Pakistan qualified for the final for the third time, after 2007 and 2009.

Final
13 November 2022
19:00 (N)
Scorecard

Pakistan; 137/8 (20 overs)	v	England; 138/5 (19 overs)
Shan Masood 38 (28); Sam Curran 3/12 (4 overs)		Ben Stokes 52* (49); Haris Rauf 2/23 (4 overs)

England won by 5 wickets
Melbourne Cricket Ground, Melbourne
Attendance: 80,462
Umpires: Kumar Dharmasena (SL) and Marais Erasmus (SA)
Player of the match: Sam Curran (Eng)

- England won the toss and elected to field.

=== United States & West Indies 2024 ===
Squad and kit

- Babar Azam (c)
- Saim Ayub
- Shaheen Afridi
- Abbas Afridi
- Abrar Ahmed
- Iftikhar Ahmed
- Mohammad Amir
- Azam Khan (wk)
- Shadab Khan
- Usman Khan (wk)
- Haris Rauf
- Mohammad Rizwan (wk)
- Naseem Shah
- Imad Wasim
- Fakhar Zaman

2024 kit

Results

Event	Group stage (Group A)					Overall Result
Event	Opposition Result	Opposition Result	Opposition Result	Opposition Result	Rank	Overall Result
2024	United States; T+L by Super over	India; L by 6 runs	Canada; W by 7 wickets	Ireland; W by 3 wickets	3	Group Stage

Scorecards

Group stage (Group A)

6 June 2024
10:30 UTC−5
Scorecard

Pakistan; 159/7 (20 overs)	v	United States; 159/3 (20 overs)
Babar Azam 44 (43); Nosthush Kenjige 3/30 (4 overs)		Monank Patel 50 (38); Mohammad Amir 1/25 (4 overs)

Match tied (United States won the Super Over)
Grand Prairie Stadium, Dallas
Umpires: Michael Gough (Eng) and Allahudien Paleker (SA)
Player of the match: Monank Patel (USA)

- United States won the toss and elected to field.
- This was the first time Pakistan and United States faced each other in T20Is.
- Babar Azam (Pak) became the highest run-scorer in T20Is, surpassing Virat Kohli.
- This was United States's first win against Pakistan in T20Is.
- Super Over: United States 18/1, Pakistan 13/1

9 June 2024
10:30 UTC−4
Scorecard

India; 119 (19 overs)	v	Pakistan; 113/7 (20 overs)
Rishabh Pant 42 (31); Naseem Shah 3/21 (4 overs)		Mohammad Rizwan 31 (44); Jasprit Bumrah 3/14 (4 overs)

India won by 6 runs
Nassau County International Cricket Stadium, East Meadow
Umpires: Richard Illingworth (Eng) and Rod Tucker (Aus)
Player of the match: Jasprit Bumrah (Ind)

- Pakistan won the toss and elected to field.
- Mohammad Rizwan (Pak) played in his 100th T20I match.

11 June 2024
10:30 UTC−4
Scorecard

Canada; 106/7 (20 overs)	v	Pakistan; 107/3 (17.3 overs)
Aaron Johnson 52 (44); Mohammad Amir 2/13 (4 overs)		Mohammad Rizwan 53* (53); Dillon Heyliger 2/18 (4 overs)

Pakistan won by 7 wickets
Nassau County International Cricket Stadium, East Meadow
Umpires: Kumar Dharmasena (SL) and Adrian Holdstock (SA)
Player of the match: Mohammad Amir (Pak)

- Pakistan won the toss and elected to field.
- Haris Rauf (Pak) took his 100th wicket in T20Is.

16 June 2024
10:30 UTC−4
Scorecard

Ireland; 106/9 (20 overs)	v	Pakistan; 111/7 (18.5 overs)
Gareth Delany 31 (19); Imad Wasim 3/8 (4 overs)		Babar Azam 32* (34); Barry McCarthy 3/15 (4 overs)

Pakistan won by 3 wickets
Central Broward Park, Lauderhill
Umpires: Chris Gaffaney (NZ) and Rod Tucker (Aus)
Player of the match: Shaheen Afridi (Pak)

- Pakistan won the toss and elected to field.

=== India & Sri Lanka 2026 ===
Squad and kit

- Salman Ali Agha (c)
- Shadab Khan
- Shaheen Shah Afridi
- Mohammad Nawaz
- Khawaja Nafay (wk)
- Fakhar Zaman
- Abrar Ahmed
- Faheem Ashraf
- Sahibzada Farhan (wk)
- Babar Azam
- Saim Ayub
- Naseem Shah
- Usman Khan (wk)
- Usman Tariq
- Salman Mirza

2026 kit

Results

Group stage (Group A)					Super 8				Overall Result
Opposition Result	Opposition Result	Opposition Result	Opposition Result	Rank	Opposition Result	Opposition Result	Opposition Result	Rank	Overall Result
Netherlands; Won by 3 wickets	United States; Won by 32 runs	India; Lost by 61 runs	Namibia; Won by 102 runs	2	New Zealand; No result	England; Lost by 2 wickets	Sri Lanka; Won by 5 runs	3	Super 8
Source: ESPNcricinfo

Scorecards

Group stage (Group A)

Match 1
7 February 2026
11:00 UTC+5:30
Scorecard

Netherlands; 147 (19.5 overs)	v	Pakistan; 148/7 (19.3 overs)
Scott Edwards 37 (29); Salman Mirza 3/24 (3.5 overs)		Sahibzada Farhan 47 (31); Paul van Meekeren 2/20 (4 overs)

Pakistan won by 3 wickets
Sinhalese Sports Club Cricket Ground, Colombo
Attendance: 5,000
Umpires: Kumar Dharmasena (SL) and Wayne Knights (NZ)
Player of the match: Faheem Ashraf (Pak)

- Pakistan won the toss and elected to field.

Match 12
10 February 2026
19:00 UTC+5:30 (N)
Scorecard

Pakistan; 190/9 (20 overs)	v	United States; 158/8 (20 overs)
Sahibzada Farhan 73 (41); Shadley van Schalkwyk 4/25 (4 overs)		Shubham Ranjane 51 (30); Usman Tariq 3/27 (4 overs)

Pakistan won by 32 runs
Sinhalese Sports Club Cricket Ground, Colombo
Umpires: Richard Illingworth (Eng) and Raveendra Wimalasiri (SL)
Player of the match: Sahibzada Farhan (Pak)

- United States won the toss and elected to field.
- Ehsan Adil (USA) made his T20I debut.
- Shaheen Afridi (Pak) played in his 100th T20I match.
- Sahibzada Farhan (Pak) scored his 1,000th run in T20Is.

Match 27
15 February 2026
19:00 UTC+5:30 (N)
Scorecard

India; 175/7 (20 overs)	v	Pakistan; 114 (18 overs)
Ishan Kishan 77 (40); Saim Ayub 3/25 (4 overs)		Usman Khan 44 (34); Hardik Pandya 2/16 (3 overs)

India won by 61 runs
R. Premadasa Stadium, Colombo
Umpires: Kumar Dharmasena (SL) and Richard Illingworth (Eng)
Player of the match: Ishan Kishan (Ind)

- Pakistan won the toss and elected to field.
- This was India's highest total against Pakistan in the T20 World Cup history.
- This was India's biggest win (by runs) against Pakistan in T20Is.
- India's extended their record winning-streak in T20 World Cup to eleven consecutive wins.
- This was India's sixteenth consecutive win in ICC limited-overs tournaments, the longest winning streak by any team.
- India qualified for the Super 8 as a result of this match.

Match 35
18 February 2026
15:00 UTC+5:30 (D/N)
Scorecard

Pakistan; 199/3 (20 overs)	v	Namibia; 97 (17.3 overs)
Sahibzada Farhan 100* (58); Jack Brassell 2/48 (4 overs)		Louren Steenkamp 23 (22); Usman Tariq 4/16 (3.3 overs)

Pakistan won by 102 runs
Sinhalese Sports Club Cricket Ground, Colombo
Umpires: Chris Gaffaney (NZ) and Richard Illingworth (Eng)
Player of the match: Sahibzada Farhan (Pak)

- Pakistan won the toss and elected to bat.
- Sahibzada Farhan (Pak) scored his maiden century in T20Is. This was the third century in the 2026 tournament and 14th overall in the T20 World Cup history.
- This was Pakistan's largest winning margin in a T20 World Cup match, surpassing their previous winning margin of 82 runs against Netherlands in 2009.
- Pakistan qualified for the Super 8 while Netherlands and United States were eliminated as a result of this match.

Super 8 (Group 2)

Match 41
21 February 2026
19:00 UTC+5:30 (N)
Scorecard

Pakistan	v	New Zealand

No result
R. Premadasa Stadium, Colombo
Umpires: Paul Reiffel (Aus) and Rod Tucker (Aus)

- Pakistan won the toss and elected to bat.
- No play was possible due to rain.
- This was the 50th T20I game between New Zealand and Pakistan.
- Daryl Mitchell (NZ) played in his 100th T20I match.

Match 45
24 February 2026
19:00 UTC+5:30 (N)
Scorecard

Pakistan; 164/9 (20 overs)	v	England; 166/8 (19.1 overs)
Sahibzada Farhan 63 (45); Liam Dawson 3/24 (4 overs)		Harry Brook 100 (51); Shaheen Afridi 4/30 (4 overs)

England won by 2 wickets
Pallekele Cricket Stadium, Kandy
Umpires: Nitin Menon (Ind) and Sam Nogajski (Aus)
Player of the match: Harry Brook (Eng)

- Pakistan won the toss and elected to bat.
- Shadab Khan (Pak) scored his 1,000th run in T20Is. He also became the first cricketer from Pakistan to score 1,000 runs and take 100 wickets in T20Is.
- Harry Brook (Eng) scored his maiden century in T20Is. He also became the first captain to score a century in the T20 World Cup. This was the fourth century in the 2026 tournament and 15th overall in the T20 World Cup history.
- England qualified for their fifth consecutive and overall sixth T20 World Cup semi-final as a result of this match.

Match 50
28 February 2026
19:00 UTC+5:30 (N)
Scorecard

Pakistan; 212/8 (20 overs)	v	Sri Lanka; 207/6 (20 overs)
Sahibzada Farhan 100 (60); Dilshan Madushanka 3/33 (4 overs)		Dasun Shanaka 76* (31); Abrar Ahmed 3/23 (4 overs)

Pakistan won by 5 runs
Pallekele Cricket Stadium, Kandy
Umpires: Sam Nogajski (Aus) and Rod Tucker (Aus)
Player of the match: Sahibzada Farhan (Pak)

- Sri Lanka won the toss and elected to field.
- Sahibzada Farhan and Fakhar Zaman's 176-run partnership for Pakistan was the highest partnership ever in the T20 World Cup.
- Sahibzada Farhan (Pak) broke Virat Kohli's 2014 record for most runs scored in a single edition of the T20 World Cup (383 runs). He also became the first batsman to score two centuries in a single edition of the T20 World Cup. This was the fifth century in the 2026 tournament and 16th overall in the T20 World Cup history.
- Abrar Ahmed (Pak) took his 50th wicket in T20Is.
- Dasun Shanaka became the first Sri Lankan to hit 100 sixes in T20Is and the first captain to score 20 sixes in the T20 World Cup. He also broke Kusal Perera's 2017 record for most sixes in a T20I innings for Sri Lanka (8 sixes).
- New Zealand qualified for their fifth T20 World Cup semi-final while Pakistan were eliminated as a result of this match.

== Records and statistics ==
=== Most appearances ===
This list consists players with most number of matches at the T20 World Cup. Shahid Afridi and Shoaib Malik has played the most matches(34), Babar Azam has captained the team most times(13).

Matches	Player	Years
34	Shahid Afridi	2007-2016
34	Shoaib Malik	2007-2021
30	Kamran Akmal	2007-2014
30	Mohammad Hafeez	2007-2021
24	Umar Gul	2007-2014
Last updated: 4 November 2022

=== Most runs ===
No.	Player	Runs	Average	HS	100	50	4s	6s	Years
1	Shoaib Malik	646	34.00	57	—N/a	3	47	17	2007–2021
2	Babar Azam	640	33.68	70	—N/a	5	56	9	2021–2026
3	Mohammad Rizwan	566	40.42	79*	—N/a	5	43	18	2021–2024
4	Shahid Afridi	546	18.82	54*	—N/a	2	49	21	2007–2016
5	Kamran Akmal	524	20.96	73	—N/a	3	50	16	2007–2014
Last updated: 24 February 2026

=== Most wickets ===
Wickets	Player	BBI	Years
39	Shahid Afridi	4/11	2007–2016
36	Saeed Ajmal	4/19	2009–2014
35	Umar Gul	5/6	2007–2014
30	Shaheen Afridi	4/22	2021–2026
25	Shadab Khan	4/26	2021–2026
Last updated: 24 February 2026

== See also ==
- Pakistan at the Cricket World Cup
- ICC Men's T20 World Cup
