= Pakistan Cup =

Pakistani cricket competition

- Countries: Pakistan
- Administrator: Pakistan Cricket Board
- Format: Limited overs (List A)
- First edition: 2008–09
- Latest edition: 2024-25
- Next edition: 2025–26
- Number of teams: 8
- Current champion: Peshawar (1 title)
- TV: PTV Sports; Geo Super; A Sports
- Website: www.pcb.com.pk

The Pakistan Cup (Urdu: پاکستان کپ) is the national domestic List A cricket competition in Pakistan. Played originally as the Pentangular One Day Cup in 2008–09, 2009–10 and 2014–15, the competition was renamed as the Pakistan Cup in 2016 when it also adopted a draft to select squads for the five provincial teams. Following a national restructuring of domestic cricket by the Pakistan Cricket Board in 2019, the tournament has been contested by the six regional teams, although the first edition under the new structure, in 2019–20, was not held due to the COVID-19 pandemic.

Prior to 2019–20, the premier List A domestic competition in Pakistan was the National One-Day Cup which was contested by associations or departments, or a combination of the two.

== Format ==
Each team plays one another (twice since 2019–20) in a round-robin group stage. Historically, the top two teams in the league play a final. Since 2019–20, the top four teams contest in a semi-final followed by a final.

== Teams ==
=== Current teams ===
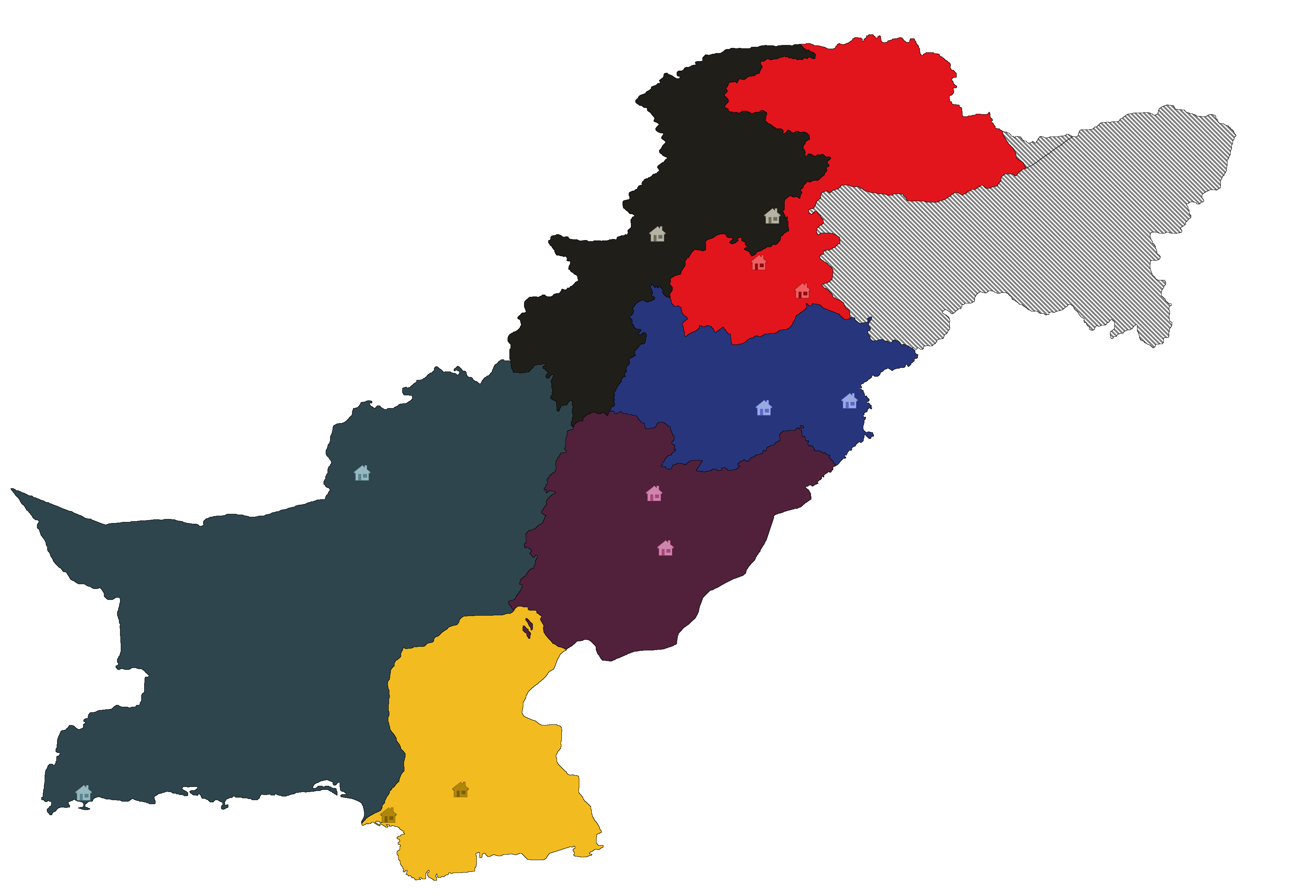

Details of each team are set out below.

Team name	Home ground/s	First season	Last title	Titles	Team captain/s
Balochistan	Bugti Stadium; Gwadar Cricket Stadium	2016	2021-22	1	Yasir Shah
Central Punjab	Gaddafi Stadium; Iqbal Stadium	2020-21	2022–23	1	Raza Ali Dar
Khyber Pakhtunkhwa	Arbab Niaz Stadium; Abbottabad Cricket Stadium	2016	2016	1	Iftikhar Ahmed
Northern	Rawalpindi Cricket Stadium; Islamabad Cricket Stadium	2020-21	n/a	0	Shadab Khan
Sindh	National Stadium; Niaz Stadium	2016	n/a	0	Mir Hamza
Southern Punjab	Multan Cricket Stadium; Bahawal Stadium	2020-21	n/a	0	Salman Ali Agha

=== Team Results ===
Team name	2016	2017	2018	2019	2020–21	2021–22	2022–23
Balochistan	(4)	R (1)	(5)	R (1)	(6)	W (2)	R (2)
Central Punjab	n/a	n/a	n/a	n/a	R (4)	(4)	W (1)
Khyber Pakhtunkhwa	W (1)	(5)	R (2)	W (2)	W (2)	R (1)	(3)
Northern	n/a	n/a	n/a	n/a	(3)	(6)	(6)
Sindh	(3)	(3)	(4)	(4)	(1)	(3)	(5)
Southern Punjab	n/a	n/a	n/a	n/a	(5)	(5)	(4)

Notes

- W = Winner;
- R = Runner-up;
- (x) = End of league games table position;

=== Former teams ===
- Baluchistan Bears (later Baluchistan Warriors)
- Federal Leopards (later Federal United)
- North-West Frontier Province Panthers (later Khyber Pakhtunkhwa Fighters)
- Punjab Stallions (later Punjab Badshahs)
- Sind Dolphins (later Sind Knights)

== Winners and competition details ==
Year	Final				Format	Teams
Year	Venue	Winners	Result	Runners-up	Format	Teams
Pentangular Cup
2008–09; Details	National Stadium, Karachi	Punjab Stallions; 219/2 (41.5 overs)	Won by 8 wickets Scorecard	Federal Leopards; 218 all out (48.1 overs)	round-robin, final	5
2009–10; Details	National Stadium, Karachi	Sindh Dolphins; 270/6 (50 overs)	Won by 78 runs Scorecard	Baluchistan Bears; 192 all out (43.5 overs)	round-robin, final	5
2010–11	Not held					
2011–12	Not held					
2012–13	Not held					
2013–14	Not held					
2014–15; Details	National Stadium, Karachi	KPK Fighters; 242/4 (47 overs)	Won by 6 wickets Scorecard	Baluchistan Warriors; 238 all out (47 overs)	round-robin, final	5
Pakistan Cup
2015-16; Details	Iqbal Stadium, Faisalabad	KPK Fighters; 311 for 9 (50 overs)	Won by 151 runs Scorecard	Punjab Badshahs; 160 all out (36.1 overs)	round-robin, final	5
2016-17; Details	Rawalpindi Cricket Stadium, Rawalpindi	KPK Fighters; 327 for 9 (50 overs)	Won by 1 wicket Scorecard	Baluchistan Warriors; 323 for 9 (50 overs)	round-robin, final	5
2017-18; Details	Iqbal Stadium, Faisalabad	Federal United; 254 for 5 (41 overs)	Won by 5 wickets Scorecard	KPK Fighters; 252 all out (43.4 overs)	round-robin, final	5
2018-19; Details	Rawalpindi Cricket Stadium, Rawalpindi	KPK Fighters; 307 for 7 (50 overs)	Won by 9 runs Scorecard	Baluchistan Warriors; 298 for 9 (50 overs)	round-robin, final	5
2019–20	Not held due to the COVID-19 pandemic.					
2020–21; Details	State Bank of Pakistan Sports Complex, Karachi	Khyber Pakhtunkhwa; 245 for 3 (36.1 overs)	Won by 7 wickets Scorecard	Central Punjab; 239 all out (47 overs)	double round-robin, final	6
2021–22; Details	Multan Cricket Stadium, Multan	Balochistan; 175 for 2 (31.2 overs)	Won by 8 wickets Scorecard	Khyber Pakhtunkhwa; 171 all out (46 overs)	double round-robin, final	6
2022–23; Details	State Bank of Pakistan Sports Complex, Karachi	Central Punjab; 254 all out (48.2 overs)	won by 50 runs Scorecard	Balochistan; 204 all out (42.3 overs)	double round-robin, final	6
2023–24; Details	Rawalpindi Cricket Stadium, Rawalpindi	Peshawar; 108 for 5 (17.2 overs)	Peshawar won by 5 wickets Scorecard	Karachi Whites; 103 all out (31.2 overs)	double round-robin, final	8

== See also ==
- Quaid-e-Azam Trophy
- National T20 Cup
- Pakistan Super League
- Kashmir Premier League (Pakistan)
