= 2009–10 Pentangular One Day Cup =

- Dates: 19 – 29 April 2010
- Administrator(s): Pakistan Cricket Board
- Cricket format: Limited overs (List A)
- Tournament format(s): Round Robin and final
- Host(s): Karachi
- Champions: Sindh Dolphins
- Participants: 5
- Matches: 11
- Most runs: 246 – Shahzaib Hasan (Sindh)
- Most wickets: 14 – Zulfiqar Babar (Baluchistan)

The 2009–10 RBS Pentangular One Day Cup was the second edition of the Pentangular One Day Cup, a List A (limited overs) cricket tournament held in Karachi, Pakistan. Five teams participated in the competition; four Pakistan provincial teams and one representing the capital.

Sindh Dolphins won the tournament by defeating Baluchistan Bears in the final.

== Final ==
29 April 2010 (D/N)
Scorecard

Sindh Dolphins; 270 for 6 (50 overs)	v	Baluchistan Bears; 192 all out (43.5 overs)
Hasan Raza 61 (64); Mohammad Irfan 2/57 (8 overs)		Abid Ali 63 (88); Lal Kumar 3/22 (10 overs)

Sindh Dolphins won by 78 runs
National Stadium, Karachi
Umpires: Nadeem Ghauri and Saleem Badar
Player of the match: Hasan Raza (Sindh Dolphins)

- Sindh Dolphins won the toss and elected to bat
- Sindh Dolphins won the 2009/10 RBS Pentangular One Day Cup
