= 2017 Pakistan Super League spot-fixing scandal =

Betting scandal in cricket

The 2016 Pakistan Super League spot-fixing scandal arose in February 2016 when the Pakistan Cricket Board (PCB) suspended several cricketers under its anti-corruption code in an ongoing investigation on spot-fixing, backed by International Cricket Council (ICC)'s Anti-Corruption and Security Unit, during the 2016 Pakistan Super League. The six cricketers that were suspended by the PCB were: Sharjeel Khan (on 10 February), Khalid Latif (on 10 February), Nasir Jamshed (on 13 February), Mohammad Irfan (on 14 March), Shahzaib Hasan (on 17 March) and Mohammad Nawaz (16 May).

In March 2016, the PCB banned Irfan for one year from all forms of the game after he pleaded guilty to the charges. After several months of hearing, in August 2016, Sharjeel was found guilty on five counts of the charges and banned for five years from all forms of cricket. Latif was banned for five years in September 2016, being found guilty on six counts of the charges. Jamshed and Shahzaib were each handed a one-year ban in December 2016 and February 2018, respectively. In August 2018, Shahzaib's ban was extended to 4 years and Jamshed received a 10-year ban from all forms of cricket.

== Allegations ==
- Sharjeel allegedly received 2 million Pakistani rupees in order to play two dot balls in the match against Peshawar Zalmi.
- Latif was allegedly given bat grips by bookies which he had rolled on to his bat to indicate that he would go through with the spot-fixing. He was also accused of persuading three other players to participate in the fixing.

== Charges and punishment ==
Sharjeel Khan (Ban of 5 years)	Khalid Latif (Ban of 5 years and fine of ₨. 1 million)
2.1.1: Fixing or influencing improperly the result of a match; 2.1.2: Ensuring betting the occurrence of an incident in a match; 2.1.3: Seeking, accepting, offering or agreeing to accept bribe/reward to fix or ensure betting; 2.4.4: Failing to disclose corrupt approaches to PCB's Vigilance & Security Department (VSD); 2.4.5: Failing to disclose to PCB's VSD any incident breaching PCB's anti-corruption code	2.1.1: Fixing or influencing improperly the result of a match; 2.1.2: Ensuring betting the occurrence of an incident in a match; 2.1.3: Seeking, accepting, offering or agreeing to accept bribe/reward to fix or ensure betting; 2.4.4: Failing to disclose corrupt approaches to PCB's VSD; 2.4.5: Failing to disclose to PCB's VSD any incident breaching PCB's anti-corruption code; Persuading three other players (Sharjeel, Irfan and Shahzaib) to take part in fixing
Mohammad Irfan (Ban of 1 year and fine of ₨. 1 million)	Mohammad Nawaz (Suspension of 2 months and fine of ₨. 200,000)
2.4.4: Failing to disclose corrupt approaches to PCB's VSD	2.4.4: Failing to disclose corrupt approaches to PCB's VSD
Nasir Jamshed (Ban of 1 year)	Shahzaib Hasan (Ban of 1 year and fine of ₨. 1 million)
2.4.6: Not co-operating with an investigation; 2.4.7: Obstructing or delaying an investigation	2.1.4: Directly or indirectly facilitating with corrupt activities; 2.4.4: Failing to disclose corrupt approaches to PCB's VSD; 2.4.5: Failing to disclose to PCB's VSD any incident breaching PCB's anti-corruption code

== Timeline ==
=== February ===
On 10 February, it was reported that Sharjeel Khan and Khalid Latif were questioned and provisionally suspended by the PCB's Anti-Corruption Unit (ACU) after the conclusion of the opening match of the 2017 Pakistan Super League which was being held in the UAE. Islamabad United player Mohammad Irfan was also questioned by the Anti-Corruption Unit along with his teammates Sharjeel and Latif, with the PCB announcing that, unlike the other two, Irfan would not "face any immediate suspension." On 11 February, Zulfiqar Babar and Shahzaib Hasan were also questioned by the Anti-Corruption Unit, but were allowed to take further part in the tournament.

Pakistan Super League (PSL) chairman Najam Sethi said that they had evidence against Sharjeel and Latif, but waited till the end of the match to see whether the two would fulfill their commitments to the bookmakers. He added, "We knew what commitments they had made. Islamabad United played Sharjeel but not Khalid. But when the match was held it was confirmed Sharjeel had done what he had committed to do to the bookmakers." He also stated that they feared making the announcement before the start of tournament as it "could affect the PSL and its reputation."

On 13 February, Nasir Jamshed was provisionally suspended by the PCB for violating its anti-corruption code. Jamshed and another man were arrested by the National Crime Agency (NCA) later the same day in the UK in connection with the investigation. However, both men were released on bail till April 2017 pending further inquiry. The NCA released a statement that it was "working closely with the Pakistan Cricket Board and International Cricket Council's anti-corruption units."

On 18 February, following three days of interviews with the PCB's Vigilance and Security Department (VSD), Sharjeel and Latif were charged for alleged breaches of its anti-corruption code in Lahore. Among the breaches of the code were "attempt to corrupt a game" and "failing to disclose suspect approaches." It was reported that Sharjeel had allegedly breached five articles of the code, while Latif had allegedly breached six. PCB's legal advisor Taffazul Rizvi stated that the two players were "handed notices and advised to seek legal counsel" and that they had 14 days to respond.

=== March ===
On 4 March, Sharjeel and Latif responded to the charges laid against them, with both accepting at least one of the minor charges but denying major allegations. In the aftermath of this, the PCB formed a three-man tribunal of retired Justice Asghar Haider, former PCB chairman Tauqir Zia, and former cricketer Wasim Bari to hear the cases of the two players. On 17 March, Sharjeel appeared before the tribunal to hear the charges, whereas Latif forced the postponement of his hearing citing health issues. Sharjeel was given up to 5 May to respond to the accusations, with the formal hearing scheduled for 15 May. Latif was set a deadline of 31 March to appear before the tribunal.

On 10 March, the PCB summoned Irfan and Shahzaib for questioning by the anti-corruption unit on 13 and 14 March respectively. On 14 March, the PCB provisionally suspended Irfan from all forms of the game with immediate effect for alleged breaches of two articles of the code during the PSL. On 17 March, Shahzaib was also provisionally suspended from all forms of the game with immediate effect as part of its ongoing investigation. He was given 14 days to respond in the matter.

On 20 March, Pakistan's Interior minister Nisar Ali Khan on recommendation of Federal Investigation Agency approved putting the names of five players involved on the Exit Control List (ECL) making them unable to travel overseas.

On 29 March, Irfan was banned for one year from all forms of the game after he pleaded guilty to have not reported two approaches of fixing. The ban would be effective from the date of his suspension (14 March) and can be reduced to six months if he assists the PCB in its investigation.

On 31 March, Latif's lawyer announced that they would contest the charges "because no one can be convicted on presumptions." The appeal was rejected by a court in Lahore on 14 April after the PCB released evidence to the tribunal as well as to Latif and Sharjeel. According to a PCB official, the evidence included "witness statements, recorded interviews, match footage, and copies of certain WhatsApp voice messages." Latif was also set a 5 May deadline to respond to the charges, while the formal hearing would commence from 19 May. Sharjeel's lawyer claimed that the evidence presented was "insufficient" and that Sharjeel was innocent.

=== April ===
On 11 April, Jamshed was officially charged for breaching two articles of the anti-corruption code which include "failing or refusing, without compelling justification, to cooperate" and "obstructing or delaying any investigation" of the PCB. Days later, Jamshed released a statement that he would be cooperating with the PCB in its investigation after the NCA inquiry concludes.

On 17 April, the PCB summoned Latif and Shahzaib to appear for interviews before its Security and Vigilance Department on 26 and 27 April respectively. On 21 April, Shahzaib was charged with breach of three articles of the anti-corruption code by PCB's three man tribunal. He was given a deadline of 18 May to respond to the charges, with a formal hearing scheduled for 1 June. However, Shahzaib expressed satisfaction over the investigation and decided not to go to court.

Latif did not appear for his interview on 26 April, expressing concerns about fairness of the investigation and accusing the ACU of being biased against him, while his lawyer raised opposition over the formation of the three-man tribunal. The PCB, in reply, "vehemently rejected the frivolous, baseless and false allegations", saying Latif's actions "appear to be solely aimed at frustrating and obstructing the ongoing investigations," and set a date of 2 May for him to appear for the interview.

=== May ===
An appeal by Latif challenging the powers of PCB's tribunal was rejected by the Lahore High Court on 4 May. During Sharjeel and Latif's tribunal hearing, Rizvi stated that the PCB has enough evidence against them and that the two players were "trying to use legal terms to save themselves and misguiding the tribunal."

On 8 May, the PCB summoned Mohammad Nawaz for questioning in relation to the spot-fixing investigation. On 17 May, he was suspended for two months and fined 200,000 Pakistani rupees for failing to report suspect approach. Later that day, Jamshed claimed that the PCB was "maligning" his name and threatened to take legal action against the board.

The PCB, on 17 May, presented Islamabad United cricketer Umar Amin, PCB legal advisor Salman Naseer and Islamabad United’s security official Col Khalid as witnesses against Sharjeel, who was accused of deliberately playing two dot balls in exchange for money from bookmakers. According to a report in Nawa-i-Waqt, Sharjeel later confessed that he had contacts with bookies with whom he finalized the deal but said he did not act according to the deal in the match.

Ronnie Flanagan, Chairman of ICC Anti-Corruption and Security Unit (ACSU), testified against Sharjeel. Flanagan stated that they "received intelligence that was passed to us by the British National Crime Agency" which was shared with PCB. On 18 May, Sharjeel's lawyer stated that Islamabad United coach Dean Jones, Mohammad Yousuf and Sadiq Mohammad will be presented as expert witnesses on 24 May and accused the PCB of making up a story. All three witnesses defended Sharjeel by saying the two dot balls were played on merit of each ball and not on purpose.

Khalid Latif had built his case on the basis that the [bat] grips weren't rolled on his bats by him but another other team-mate who mistakenly done it while he [Latif] was in bathroom. But we called upon this particular player who completely denied any such move and said he did not roll any such grip on Khalid's bat.

— Taffazul Rizvi

On 19 May, the PCB announced that it had seized bat grips given to Latif by bookmakers. The bat grips were used by Latif in the match allegedly as a signal to the bookmakers of accepting their offer. Latif boycotted the tribunal the following day, with his lawyer stating it was done as the tribunal refused to provide him a copy of their ACU interview held in February. The tribunal continued hearing the case in the subsequent days in the absence of Latif and his lawyer. However, on 29 May, Latif requested the tribunal that they be allowed to put forth their defence from 14 June, after his lawyer finishes his Umrah, and this was agreed to by the tribunal the following day.

The hearing of Jamshed's case was deferred till 9 June when the PCB is scheduled to submit its reply against Jamshed.

=== June ===
On 3 June, Sharjeel's lawyer announced that Sharjeel will not appear before the tribunal as a witness. In response, Rizvi said that Sharjeel decided to do so as he did not want to defend himself. On 7 June, the PCB requested the hearing to be postponed till the end of the month, with Rizvi stating that the NCA in the United Kingdom will share some evidence with the PCB. Two days later, the PCB filed a request with the three-man tribunal asking it to include the "damning" evidence shared by the NCA. However, the tribunal rejected this request.

Jamshed's preliminary hearing before a one-man panel (Haider) started on 5 June. After the PCB read out the charges and made its initial statement, the case was adjourned till 16 June.

Latif appeared before the tribunal on 14 June after an absence of four weeks, with his lawyer questioning the tribunal formation. Following this objection, the tribunal decided to put the hearing on hold. After the formation of a new one-man disciplinary panel of Justice Fazal-e-Miran Chohan, Latif's lawyer refused to appear for the hearing on 22 June citing insufficient time to prepare, causing the hearing to be rescheduled to 29 June. Latif then boycotted the hearing and filed another motion citing conflict of interest of the tribunal members in his case. The motion was declined again on 30 June.

=== July ===
On 7 July, former Pakistan cricketer Aaqib Javed appeared before the tribunal to provide his assessment of the dot balls played by Sharjeel. Javed stated that "the background story [PCB] told me is convincing but they didn't show me the evidence". The tribunal further adjourned the case to 13 July and invited an NCA official as its secondary witness. Andrew Ephgrave, NCA's operations manager, appeared as a witness over Skype on 13 and 14 July. Sharjeel's lawyer claimed that Ephgrave was not impartial as he had been in contact with the PCB in the past.

On 18 July, Shahzaib appeared for his hearing and denied all charges levied on him by the PCB. The hearing was adjourned till 24 July while the hearing for his appeal against the provisional suspension was pushed to 15 August. The former hearing was then adjourned until 16 August as his lawyer was unavailable on the specified date.

Latif's lawyer continued to claim that the tribunal was not impartial, boycotting proceedings throughout the month.

=== August ===
On 1 August, the tribunal ordered Latif to provide his final written reply to the charges by 9 August. The tribunal also declined Latif's lawyer's request to share the video recordings of the evidences of PCB's witnesses and tribunal proceedings, sensing an attempt by the accused to cause further delay in the proceedings. It however shared the PCB's written arguments with Latif's lawyer. On 12 August, after Latif's failure to submit a written reply on time, the tribunal decided to extend the date to 22 August. Latif's lawyer stated that he asked for the extension as they intended to move the Supreme Court regarding the alleged lack of impartiality of the tribunal members.

On 22 August, Lahore High Court (LHC) in a ruling allowed Shahzaib to make one foreign trip to visit his family in England. Earlier in late July, he had filed a petition in the court seeking omission of his name from ECL. Following which the LHC issued notices to the Interior ministry and PCB, seeking their reply till 7 August.

Jamshed made his first appearance before the tribunal on 28 August over a Skype call from England. According to Rizvi, Jamshed admitted that he had been in contact with Yousaf Anwar, a person whose role is said to be central in PCB's case, and persuaded Latif to meet Anwar. Rizvi added that Jamshed also agreed on the call to have refused PCB's offer to send its legal team to England to interrogate him. The hearing was scheduled for 19 September.

On 30 August, Sharjeel Khan was banned for five years from all forms of cricket after being found guilty on five counts in violation of the PCB's anti-corruption code. He had been given the minimum punishment on all charges. Two-and-a-half years out of the five-year sentence are suspended. Sharjeel's ban took effect from when he was first suspended, on 10 February. He was present at his sentencing but did not take any media questions.

=== September ===
On 20 September, Khalid Latif was banned for five years from all forms of cricket in a short verdict announced by the tribunal. He was also fined ₨. 1 million (approx. USD 9,489) and was found guilty of six major breaches of the PCB's anti-corruption code. Latif did not show up to hear the verdict being announced. Latif's lawyer Badar Alam said that they will study "the detailed decision by PCB ACT and then decide either to file an appeal or file a writ petition [against it]".

On 21 September, Latif appealed against his five-year ban with his lawyer questioning the "competence" of the verdict, while the PCB also appealed against the ban seeking a stricter punishment for the player. Rizvi told ESPNcricinfo, "We seek the maximum sentence, as [Latif] not only himself contrived to fix but additionally took Sharjeel Khan to meet the fixer and his accomplice. We feel the period of ineligibility should have been much greater than just five years." Both appeals were rejected in November by Justice Faqir Khokhar.

=== December ===
On 4 December, the PCB announced that it would present Irfan as a witness against Shahzaib before the tribunal. However, the hearing was adjourned due to the unavailability of Shahzaib's counsel.

On 8 December, the PCB summoned Islamabad United player Mohammad Sami before its anti-corruption unit for questioning related to spot-fixing during the PSL. Earlier that year in July, Sami and Umar Akmal were among those who were named by an NCA's official for their alleged involvement in the spot-fixing scandal.

On 11 December, Nasir Jamshed was handed a one-year ban by the PCB, with the statement, "for non-co-operation with PCB" and "more charges will be brought in near future". The ban, effective from the date of his provisional suspension, was to end in February 2018.

=== 2018 ===
Latif's appeal against his five-year ban was rejected by an independent adjudicator on 31 January, but his fine of Rs. 1 million was waived. Earlier that month, Latif's lawyer had claimed in their plea that Latif had met a bookie on the insistence of Jamshed and that Latif did not commit any crime.

On 9 February, the PCB charged Jamshed with breaches of five articles of its anti-corruption code and gave him two weeks' time to respond to the charges.

On 28 February, Shahzaib Hasan was banned for one year and fined one million Pakistani rupees for his alleged role in spot-fixing scandal. The ban applied retrospectively was due to end in March 2018. On 10 August, his review appeal resulted in the ban being extended to four years while the fine was also upheld.

On 17 August, Jamshed was handed a 10-year ban after he was found guilty by the tribunal.

=== 2019 ===
In January 2019, Sharjeel accepted all five charges laid against him, including the one that he met a bookie and reached an agreement with him to spot-fixing the first match of 2017 PSL.

In December 2019, Jamshed pleaded guilty to the spot-fixing charges at a court hearing in Manchester. Jamshed admitted to have recruited players on behalf of bookies, while two British citizens Yousef Anwar and Mohammed Ijaz admitted to have offered money to cricketers in the PSL to fix outcomes.

=== 2020 ===
On 7 February, United Kingdom's National Crime Agency stated that Jamshed was sentenced to 17 months imprisonment. Anwar and Ijaz were jailed for 40 and 30 months respectively.

== See also ==
- Pakistan cricket spot-fixing scandal
