= 2014–15 Pentangular One Day Cup =

- Dates: 31 December 2014 – 11 January 2015
- Administrator(s): Pakistan Cricket Board
- Cricket format: List A (limited overs)
- Tournament format(s): Round-robin and final
- Host(s): (Pakistan) Karachi
- Champions: Khyber Pakhtunkhwa Fighters
- Participants: 5
- Matches: 11
- Most runs: Azhar Ali (302 runs)
- Most wickets: Junaid Khan (11 wickets)
- Official website: Official website

The 2014–2015 Pentangular One Day Cup was a List A (limited overs) cricket tournament in Pakistan. It was the third edition of the Pentangular One Day Cup. Sponsored by Haier, it was titled as the Cool & Cool presents Haier Pentangular One-day Cup. The tournament was originally scheduled to be held in Multan but was moved to Karachi due to persistent foggy conditions in Punjab.

The tournament was contested by five teams, four representing provinces and one from the capital, in a round-robin group stage followed by a final between the two top teams. The winners were Khyber Pakhtunkhwa Fighters, who beat Baluchistan Warriors in the final.

== Venue ==
City	Venue	Capacity	Matches
Karachi, Sindh	National Stadium	34,228	11
		2014–15 Pentangular One Day Cup is located in Pakistan	

== Group stage ==
=== Points table ===
Teams qualified for the Final
Teams eliminated at group stage

Teams	Pld	W	L	NR	NRR	Pts
Khyber Pakhtunkhwa Fighters	4	3	1	0	+0.767	6
Baluchistan Warriors	4	3	1	0	+0.061	6
Punjab Badshahs	4	3	1	0	+0.037	6
Federal United	4	1	3	0	–0.531	2
Sindh Knights	4	0	4	0	–0.332	0

=== Fixtures and results ===
31 December 2014 (D/N)
Scorecard

Khyber Pakhtunkhwa Fighters; 266/4 (50 overs)	v	Sindh Knights; 260 (49.2 overs)
Shoaib Malik 70 (82); Mir Hamza 1/41 (9 overs)		Anwar Ali 67 (36); Zafar Gohar 3/55 (9.2 overs)

Khyber-Pakhtunkhwa Fighters won by 6 runs
National Stadium, Karachi
Umpires: Ahsan Raza and Shozab Raza
Player of the match: Shoaib Malik (Khyber-Pakhtunkhwa Fighters)

- Khyber-Pakhtunkhwa Fighters, who chose to bat

1 January 2015 (D/N)
Scorecard

Khyber Pakhtunkhwa Fighters; 323/6 (50 overs)	v	Federal United; 250 (47 overs)
Mohammad Rizwan 114 (120); Umar Gul 2/64 (10 overs)		Ali Sarfraz 60 (89); Junaid Khan 3/41 (9 overs)

Khyber-Pakhtunkhwa Fighters won by 73 runs
National Stadium, Karachi
Umpires: Ahmed Shahab and Khalid Mahmood
Player of the match: Mohammad Rizwan (Khyber-Pakhtunkhwa Fighters)

- Khyber-Pakhtunkhwa Fighters, who chose to bat

2 January 2015 (D/N)
Scorecard

Sindh Knights; 316/5 (50 overs)	v	Federal United; 320/9 (50 overs)
Asad Shafiq 98 (101); Ahmed Jamal 2/46 (10 overs)		Awais Zia 87 (77); Sohail Khan 4/45 (10 overs)

Federal United won by 1 wicket
National Stadium, Karachi
Umpires: Qaiser Waheed and Tahir Hasan
Player of the match: Asad Shafiq (Sindh Knights)

- Sindh Knights, who chose to bat

3 January 2015 (D/N)
Scorecard

Khyber Pakhtunkhwa Fighters; 139/3 (35.4 overs)	v	Baluchistan Warriors; 136 (42.2 overs)
Shoaib Malik 68* (88); Ehsan Adil 2/25 (6 overs)		Ayaz Tasawwar 44 (81); Zafar Gohar 4/37 (10 overs)

Khyber-Pakhtunkhwa Fighters won by 7 wickets
National Stadium, Karachi
Umpires: Ghaffar Kazmi and Khalid Mahmood
Player of the match: Zafar Gohar (Khyber-Pakhtunkhwa Fighters)

- Baluchistan Warriors, who chose to bat

5 January 2015 (D/N)
Scorecard

Punjab Badshahs; 313/7 (49.4 overs)	v	Federal United; 312/8 (50 overs)
Ali Waqas 99 (98); Awais Zia 1/41 (5.4 overs)		Umar Amin 110 (96); Raza Hasan 5/61 (10 overs)

Punjab Badshahs won by 3 wickets
National Stadium, Karachi
Umpires: Ahsan Raza and Asif Yaqoob
Player of the match: Ali Waqas (Punjab Badshahs)

- Punjab Badshahs, who chose to field

6 January 2015 (D/N)
Scorecard

Baluchistan Warriors; 249 (50 overs)	v	Sindh Knights; 241/9 (50 overs)
Azhar Ali 117 (133); Sohail Khan 6/46 (10 overs)		Asad Shafiq 100 (106); Rahat Ali 4/49 (10 overs)

Baluchistan Warriors won by 8 runs
National Stadium, Karachi
Umpires: Ghaffar Kazmi and Sajid Afridi
Player of the match: Azhar Ali (Baluchistan Warriors)

- Sindh Knights, who chose to field

7 January 2015 (D/N)
Scorecard

Punjab Badshahs; 280/5 (48.5 overs)	v	Khyber Pakhtunkhwa Fighters; 279/7 (50 overs)
Nasir Jamshed 83 (88); Yasir Shah 2/53 (10 overs)		Adnan Raees 73 (84); Bilawal Bhatti 2/53 (9 overs)

Punjab Badshahs won by 5 wickets
National Stadium, Karachi
Umpires: Qaiser Waheed and Shozab Raza
Player of the match: Nasir Jamshed (Punjab Badshahs)

- Khyber-Pakhtunkhwa Fighters, who chose to bat

8 January 2015 (D/N)
Scorecard

Baluchistan Warriors; 323/5 (50 overs)	v	Federal United; 289 (47.1 overs)
Sami Aslam 92 (87); Awais Zia 1/39 (6 overs)		Umar Amin 100 (93); Mohammad Irfan 3/55 (9.1 overs)

Baluchistan Warriors won by 34 runs
National Stadium, Karachi
Umpires: Sajid Afridi and Tahir Hasan
Player of the match: Sami Aslam (Baluchistan Warriors)

- Federal United, who chose to field

9 January 2015 (D/N)
Scorecard

Punjab Badshahs; 253/4 (41.4 overs)	v	Sindh Knights; 252/9 (50 overs)
Shahid Yousuf 66 (78); Mir Hamza 1/42 (8 overs)		Anwar Ali 89 (83); Imad Wasim 3/45 (10 overs)

Punjab Badshahs won by 6 wickets
National Stadium, Karachi
Umpires: Ahsan Raza and Shozab Raza
Player of the match: Umar Siddiq (Punjab Badshahs)

- Punjab Badshahs, who chose to field

10 January 2015 (D/N)
Scorecard

Punjab Badshahs; 315/5 (50 overs)	v	Baluchistan Warriors; 316/9 (41 overs)
Nasir Jamshed 158 (140); Kashif Bhatti 1/52 (10 overs)		Sohaib Maqsood 125 (86); Mohammad Talha 2/62 (8 overs)

Baluchistan Warriors won by 1 wicket
National Stadium, Karachi
Umpires: Ghaffar Kazmi and Khalid Mahmood
Player of the match: Sohaib Maqsood (Baluchistan Warriors)

- Baluchistan Warriors, who chose to field

== Final ==
11 January 2015 (D/N)
Scorecard

Baluchistan Warriors; 238 (47 overs)	v	Khyber Pakhtunkhwa Fighters; 242/4 (47 overs)
Sami Aslam 119 (123); Junaid Khan 5/45 (10 overs)		Mohammad Rizwan 103 * (87); Zia-ul-Haq 1/26 (7 overs)

Khyber-Pakhtunkhwa Fighters won by 6 wickets
National Stadium, Karachi
Umpires: Ahsan Raza and Shozab Raza
Player of the match: Junaid Khan (Khyber-Pakhtunkhwa Fighters)

- Khyber-Pakhtunkhwa Fighters, who chose to field
- Khyber-Pakhtunkhwa Fighters won the 2014/15 Cool & Cool Presents Haier Pentangular Cup One Day

== Statistics ==
=== Most runs ===
Player	Team	Runs	Inns	Avg	Highest	100s	50s
Azhar Ali	Baluchistan Warriors	302	5	60.40	117	1	2
Nasir Jamshed	Punjab Badshahs	282	4	70.50	158	1	1
Mohammad Rizwan	Khyber Pakhtunkhwa Fighters	278	5	69.50	114	2	1
Sami Aslam	Baluchistan Warriors	277	5	55.40	119	1	1
Asad Shafiq	Sindh Knights	272	4	68.00	100	1	2

=== Most wickets ===
Player	Team	Inning	Overs	Wkts	Ave	Econ	BBI	4	5
Junaid Khan	Khyber Pakhtunkhwa Fighters	5	45.5	11	19.81	4.75	5/45	0	1
Raza Hasan	Punjab Badshahs	4	35.0	10	20.00	5.71	5/61	0	1
Zafar Gohar	Khyber Pakhtunkhwa Fighters	5	39.2	10	20.20	5.13	4/37	1	0
Sohail Khan	Sindh Knights	4	37.0	10	20.90	5.64	6/46	1	1
Rahat Ali	Baluchistan Warriors	4	33.4	7	26.57	5.52	4/49	1	0
