= 2009 World Twenty20 =

Second edition of the ICC Men's T20 World Cup

2009 ICC World Twenty20
- Dates: 5 June – 21 June 2009
- Administrator: International Cricket Council
- Cricket format: Twenty20 International
- Tournament format(s): Group stage and knockout
- Host: England
- Champions: Pakistan (1st title)
- Runners-up: Sri Lanka
- Participants: 12 (from 16 entrants)
- Matches: 27
- Attendance: 579,975 (21,481 per match)
- Player of the series: (Sri Lanka) Tillakaratne Dilshan
- Most runs: (Sri Lanka) Tillakaratne Dilshan (317)
- Most wickets: (Pakistan) Umar Gul (13)
- Official website: www.icc-cricket.com

The 2009 ICC World Twenty20 was the second edition of the Men's T20 World Cup, formerly known as the ICC World Twenty20 that took place in England in June 2009. As before, the tournament featured 12 male teams – nine of the ten Test-playing nations and three associate nations, which earned their places through a qualification tournament. ICC Full member Zimbabwe were expelled from the tournament due to political reasons. Matches were played at three English grounds – Lord's and The Oval in London, and Trent Bridge in Nottingham. The tournament was organised in parallel with the women's tournament, with the men's semi-finals and final being preceded by the semi-finals and final from the women's event. The final took place at Lord's on Sunday 21 June with Pakistan beating Sri Lanka by eight wickets and England beating New Zealand by six wickets in the women's final.

== Background ==
In June 2006, The Daily Telegraph reported that the Marylebone Cricket Club and Surrey CCC had put in a joint bid to host the tournament at Lord's and The Oval.

In December 2007, the ICC provisionally approved a Women's World Twenty20 to run alongside the men's event which, subject to the approval of the ICC's finance and commercial affairs committee, would come into effect for the 2009 tournament in England.

In early January 2008, speculation arose that the tournament could be held elsewhere as the British government have banned Zimbabwe from touring England in 2009. However, it was later confirmed that the tournament would definitely take place in the country.

In April 2008, the third venue was confirmed as Nottingham's Trent Bridge; the 17,500 seater stadium was chosen to hold one of the semi-finals, among other earlier matches. Lord's and The Oval are the two other confirmed venues, with the opening match and final being played at Lord's. Old Trafford Cricket Ground had bid for the third venue, but Trent Bridge was chosen for its closer proximity to the two London grounds.

== Qualification ==
Teams from every ICC Region :

Africa (1)

- South Africa

Americas (1)

- West Indies

Asia (4)

- Bangladesh
- India
- Pakistan
- Sri Lanka

East Asia-Pacific (2)

- Australia
- New Zealand

Europe (4)

- England (host)
- Ireland
- Netherlands
- Scotland

Although early reports suggested the 2009 event may involve just eight teams in a nine-day event, the full twelve-team tournament was confirmed, featuring the Test-playing nations and two qualifying associate nations. However, in July 2008 Zimbabwe, under pressure from South Africa and England over political matters related to Robert Mugabe, pulled out of the tournament of their own volition, creating an additional space for an associate nation.

Qualification was achieved by the finalists of an ICC World Twenty20 Qualifier held in Belfast from 2–4 August 2008, between Kenya, Scotland, Ireland, Netherlands, Canada and Bermuda. Ireland and the Netherlands, having reached the final, qualified outright, while Scotland won the third place playoff beating Kenya to also qualify.

== Venues ==
The matches were played at the following three grounds:

Nottingham	London	London
Trent Bridge	Lord's	The Oval
Capacity: 17,500	Capacity: 28,000	Capacity: 23,500
2009 World Twenty20 is located in the United Kingdom

== Rules and regulations ==
During the group stage and Super Eight, points are awarded to the teams as follows:

Result	Points
Win	2 points
No result	1 point
Loss	0 points

In case of a tie (i.e. both teams score the same number of runs at the end of their respective innings), a Super Over decides the winner. This applies in all stages of the tournament.

Within each group (both group stage and Super Eight stage), teams are ranked against each other based on the following criteria:

1. Higher number of points
2. If equal, higher number of wins
3. If still equal, higher net run rate
4. If still equal, lower bowling strike rate
5. If still equal, result of head-to-head meeting.

=== Groups ===
The groups were announced on 31 October 2007, based on finishing positions at the 2007 ICC World Twenty20 and the successful qualifying associate nations. The initial four group format is the same as that used at the 2007 tournament. Team seed in brackets.

Group A

- India (1)
- Bangladesh (8)
- Ireland (9)

Group B

- Pakistan (2)
- England (7)
- Netherlands (10)

Group C

- Australia (3)
- Sri Lanka (6)
- West Indies (11)

Group D

- New Zealand (4)
- South Africa (5)
- Scotland (12)

== Match officials ==
The International Cricket Council announced the officials for the group stages of tournament on 28 May 2009. The officials for Super-8 stage, knockout stage and final were revealed later. Appointments were also made for the men's and women's warm-up matches at Lord's, The Oval and Trent Bridge from June 1–3.

Umpiring duties was shared by all twelve members of the Elite Panel of ICC Umpires along with 4 members from the ICC International umpire panel.

Umpire	Panel
(England) Mark Benson	Elite
(New Zealand) Billy Bowden	Elite
(Pakistan) Aleem Dar	Elite
(Australia) Steve Davis	Elite
(Sri Lanka) Asoka de Silva	Elite
(Cricket West Indies) Billy Doctrove	Elite
(England) Ian Gould	Elite
(Australia) Daryl Harper	Elite
(New Zealand) Tony Hill	Elite
(South Africa) Rudi Koertzen	Elite
(Pakistan) Asad Rauf	Elite
(Australia) Simon Taufel	Elite
(South Africa) Marais Erasmus	International
(England) Nigel Llong	International
(India) Amiesh Saheba	International
(Australia) Rod Tucker	International

The three match referees selected were members of the Panel of ICC Referees, and were responsible for all matches.

Referee
(England) Chris Broad
(Australia) Alan Hurst
(Sri Lanka) Ranjan Madugalle

== Warm-up matches ==
All times shown are in British Summer Time (UTC+01).

Warm-up matches

12 May 2009
Scorecard

Bangladesh A 129/6 (20 overs)	v	Bangladesh; 123/7 (20 overs)
Nafees Iqbal 35 (39); Abdur Razzak 2/21 (4 overs)		Junaid Siddique 33 (27); Mahmudullah 2/13 (4 overs)

Bangladesh A won by 6 runs
Shere Bangla National Stadium, Mirpur
Umpires: Abdullah Al Matin (Ban) and Gazi Sohel (Ban)

- Bangladesh won the toss and chose to field.

13 May 2009
Scorecard

Bangladesh; 133/9 (20 overs)	v	Bangladesh A 134/4 (19.4 overs)
Tamim Iqbal 66 (52); Mehrab Hossain, Jr. 2/12 (2 overs)		Mehrab Hossain, Jr. 48 (45); Syed Rasel 3/25 (4 overs)

Bangladesh A won by 6 wickets
Shere Bangla National Stadium, Mirpur
Umpires: Abdullah Al Matin (Ban) and Gazi Sohel (Ban)

- Bangladesh won the toss and chose to bat.

14 May 2009
Scorecard

Bangladesh; 140/7 (20 overs)	v	Bangladesh A 91 (16.5 overs)
Mohammad Mithun 25 (20); Sharifullah 2/12 (3 overs)		Hannan Sarkar 32 (31); Shakib Al Hasan 3/35 (4 overs)

Bangladesh won by 49 runs
Shere Bangla National Stadium, Mirpur
Umpires: Abdullah Al Matin (Ban) and Aflajur Rahman (Ban)

- Bangladesh won the toss and chose to bat.

20 May 2009
Scorecard

Pakistan Cricket Board Patron's XI; 143/3 (20 overs)	v	Pakistan Cricket Board Chairman's XI; 145/3 (18 overs)
Salman Butt 60 (53); Wahab Riaz 1/16 (3 overs)		Shahzaib Hasan 39 (28); Yasir Shah 2/28 (4 overs)

Chairman's XI won by 7 wickets
Gaddafi Stadium, Lahore
Umpires: Shozab Raza (Pak) and Zameer Haider (Pak)

- Chairman's XI won the toss and chose to field.

21 May 2009
Scorecard

Pakistan Cricket Board Chairman's XI; 145/8 (20 overs)	v	Pakistan Cricket Board Patron's XI; 142/4 (20 overs)
Mohammad Hafeez 79 (57); Shoaib Malik 2/25 (4 overs)		Shoaib Malik 71 (62); Iftikhar Anjum 2/24 (4 overs)

Chairman's XI won by 3 runs
Gaddafi Stadium, Lahore
Umpires: Nadeem Ghauri (Pak) and Rasheed Bhatti (Pak)

- No toss.

22 May 2009
Scorecard

Pakistan Cricket Board Patron's XI; 154/5 (20 overs)	v	Pakistan Cricket Board Chairman's XI; 158/5 (19.3 overs)
Ahmed Shehzad 58 (48); Mohammad Hafeez 1/18 (2 overs)		Nasir Jamshed 50* (39); Sohail Tanvir 2/29 (4 overs)

Chairman's XI won by 5 wickets
Gaddafi Stadium, Lahore
Umpires: Akram Raza (Pak) and Ehtesham-ul-Haq (Pak)

- Chairman's XI won the toss and chose to field.

26 May 2009
18:00
Scorecard

Bangladesh; 146/6 (20 overs)	v	New Zealand; 147/6 (20 overs)
Mahmudullah 43 (41); Ian Butler 2/32 (4 overs)		Martin Guptill 61 (42); Shakib Al Hasan 1/15 (4 overs)

New Zealand won by 4 wickets
Sir Paul Getty's Ground, Wormsley

- Bangladesh won the toss and chose to bat.

27 May 2009
14:00
Scorecard

Ireland; 152/5 (20 overs)	v	New Zealand; 153/3 (17 overs)
Jeremy Bray 48 (43); Jesse Ryder 3/4 (2 overs)		Ross Taylor 74* (36); Peter Connell 2/19 (3 overs)

New Zealand won by 7 wickets
County Ground, Derby
Umpires: Mark Eggleston (Eng) and Neil Mallender (Eng)

- New Zealand won the toss and chose to field.

28 May 2009
12:00
Scorecard

Ireland; 139/9 (20 overs)	v	PCA Masters XI; 140/4 (19.2 overs)
John Mooney 57 (43); Peter Such 3/17 (4 overs)		Kieron Pollard 43* (26); Nigel Jones 2/23 (3 overs)

PCA Masters XI won by 6 wickets
Sir Paul Getty's Ground, Wormsley
Umpires: Steve Bucknor (WI) and Marais Erasmus (SA)

- Ireland won the toss and chose to bat.

28 May 2009
12:00
Scorecard

West Indies; 143/6 (20 overs)	v	Scotland; 129/9 (20 overs)
Dwayne Bravo 51* (30); Glenn Rogers 2/27 (4 overs)		Colin Smith 40 (40); Darren Sammy 3/25 (3 overs)

West Indies won by 14 runs
Sir Paul Getty's Ground, Wormsley
Umpires: Steve Bucknor (WI) and Marais Erasmus (SA)

- Scotland won the toss and chose to field.

28 May 2009
13:30
Scorecard

Bangladesh; 206/6 (20 overs)	v	Netherlands; 142 (17 overs)
Mohammad Ashraful 69 (40); Pieter Seelaar 2/35 (4 overs)		Peter Borren 40 (22); Rubel Hossain 4/19 (3 overs)

Bangladesh won by 64 runs
St Lawrence Ground, Canterbury
Umpires: Neil Bainton (Eng) and Keith Coburn (Eng)

- Netherlands won the toss and chose to field.

29 May 2009
Scorecard

Netherlands; 167/5 (20 overs)	v	PCA Masters XI; 163/7 (20 overs)
Darron Reekers 43 (29); Mark Alleyne 1/12 (2 overs)		Adam Wheater 44 (34); Pieter Seelaar 2/28 (4 overs)

Netherlands won by 4 runs
Sir Paul Getty's Ground, Wormsley
Umpires: Marais Erasmus (SA) and Rod Tucker (Aus)

- PCA Masters XI won the toss and chose to field.

29 May 2009
Scorecard

New Zealand; 198/3 (20 overs)	v	PCA Masters XI; 144/8 (20 overs)
Ross Taylor 74; Andrew White 1/24 (2 overs)		Scott Styris 51 (31); Iain O'Brien 3/14 (3 overs)

New Zealand won by 54 runs
Sir Paul Getty's Ground, Wormsley
Umpires: Steve Bucknor (WI) and Marais Erasmus (SA)

29 May 2009
Scorecard

Scotland; 141/7 (20 overs)	v	Bangladesh; 142/2 (18.4 overs)
Neil McCallum 50 (37); Rubel Hossain 5/16 (4 overs)		Mahmudullah 46* (35); Jan Stander 1/13 (2 overs)

Bangladesh won by 6 wickets
Sir Paul Getty's Ground, Wormsley
Umpires: Steve Bucknor (WI) and Rod Tucker (Aus)

- Bangladesh won the toss and chose to field.

30 May 2009
Scorecard

Ireland; 119 (19.2 overs)	v	West Indies; 120/5 (17.5 overs)
Kyle McCallan 25* (19); Lionel Baker 3/22 (3 overs)		Denesh Ramdin 24* (22); Boyd Rankin 2/18 (4 overs)

West Indies won by 5 wickets
Sir Paul Getty's Ground, Wormsley
Umpires: Amiesh Saheba (Ind) and Rod Tucker (Aus)

- Ireland won the toss and chose to bat.

30 May 2009
Scorecard

New Zealand; 194/8 (20 overs)	v	Netherlands; 104 (19.3 overs)
Brendon McCullum 62; Pieter Seelaar 3/35 (4 overs)		Peter Borren 19; James Franklin 3/10 (4 overs)

New Zealand won by 90 runs
Sir Paul Getty's Ground, Wormsley

- New Zealand won the toss and chose to bat.

30 May 2009
Scorecard

Scotland; 160/6 (20 overs)	v	PCA Masters XI; 148/6 (20 overs)
Fraser Watts 88* (65); Waruna Ramanayake 3/22 (3 overs)		Jason Gallian 50 (36); Majid Haq 2/18 (4 overs)

Scotland won by 12 runs
Sir Paul Getty's Ground, Wormsley
Umpires: Marais Erasmus (SA) and Amiesh Saheba (Ind)

- Scotland won the toss and chose to bat.

1 June 2009
13:30
Scorecard

Australia; 219/6 (20 overs)	v	Bangladesh; 181/7 (20 overs)
Shane Watson 52 (23); Mahmudullah 4/37 (4 overs)		Shakib Al Hasan 54 (29); Mitchell Johnson 3/21 (4 overs)

Australia won by 38 runs
Trent Bridge, Nottingham
Umpires: Nigel Llong (Eng) and Amiesh Saheba (Ind)

- Australia won the toss and chose to bat.

1 June 2009
13:30
Scorecard

Netherlands; 135/9 (20 overs)	v	Ireland; 135/7 (20 overs)
Ryan ten Doeschate 29 (34); Kyle McCallan 3/32 (4 overs)		Andre Botha 35 (32); Pieter Seelaar 3/28 (4 overs)

Scores level; Ireland won the Super Over
Lord's, London
Umpires: Rod Tucker (Aus) and Marais Erasmus (SA)

- Netherlands won the toss and chose to bat.

1 June 2009
17:30
Scorecard

New Zealand; 170/7 (20 overs)	v	India; 161/6 (20 overs)
Ross Taylor 41 (33); Ishant Sharma 4/25 (4 overs)		Suresh Raina 45 (24); Daniel Vettori 3/24 (3 overs)

New Zealand won by 9 runs
Lord's, London
Umpires: Rod Tucker (Aus) and Marais Erasmus (SA)

- India won the toss and chose to field.

1 June 2009
17:30
Scorecard

South Africa; 186/7 (20 overs)	v	Pakistan; 127 (19.4 overs)
Graeme Smith 70 (52); Saeed Ajmal 2/24 (4 overs)		Ahmed Shehzad 31 (26); Johan Botha 2/19 (4 overs)

South Africa won by 59 runs
Trent Bridge, Nottingham
Umpires: Nigel Llong (Eng) and Amiesh Saheba (Ind)

- South Africa won the toss and chose to bat.

2 June 2009
13:30
Scorecard

Ireland; 130/7 (20 overs)	v	West Indies; 134/1 (16 overs)
Jeremy Bray 30 (29); Sulieman Benn 2/24 (4 overs)		Chris Gayle 88* (56); Kyle McCallan 1/30 (3 overs)

West Indies won by 9 wickets
The Oval, London
Umpires: Marais Erasmus (SA) and Rod Tucker (Aus)

- Ireland won the toss and chose to bat.

2 June 2009
13:30
Scorecard

Bangladesh; 151/6 (20 overs)	v	Sri Lanka; 152/6 (19.4 overs)
Raqibul Hasan 38* (40); Isuru Udana 2/30 (4 overs)		Mahela Jayawardene 43 (28); Shakib Al Hasan 2/18 (4 overs)

Sri Lanka won by 4 wickets
Trent Bridge, Nottingham
Umpires: Nigel Llong (Eng) and Amiesh Saheba (Ind)

- Bangladesh won the toss and chose to bat.

2 June 2009
17:30
Scorecard

New Zealand; 147 (19.5 overs)	v	Australia; 151/3 (19.2 overs)
Peter McGlashan 49 (35); Mitchell Johnson 4/20 (4 overs)		Ricky Ponting 56 (40); James Franklin 2/27 (4 overs)

Australia won by 7 wickets
The Oval, London
Umpires: Marais Erasmus (SA) and Steve O'Shaughnessy (Eng)

- New Zealand won the toss and chose to bat.

2 June 2009
17:30
Scorecard

Scotland; 136/5 (20 overs)	v	England; 141/4 (19 overs)
Colin Smith 45 (31); Paul Collingwood 2/18 (3 overs)		Kevin Pietersen 53* (39); Majid Haq 2/19 (4 overs)

England won by 6 wickets
Trent Bridge, Nottingham
Umpires: Nigel Llong (Eng) and Amiesh Saheba (Ind)

- Scotland won the toss and chose to bat.

3 June 2009
13:30
Scorecard

Sri Lanka; 109/9 (20 overs)	v	South Africa; 113/4 (19.1 overs)
Angelo Mathews 28 (35); Johan Botha 2/9 (3 overs)		Herschelle Gibbs 48 (53); Lasith Malinga 2/21 (4 overs)

South Africa won by 6 wickets
Lord's, London
Umpires: Tony Hill (NZ) and Simon Taufel (Aus)

- South Africa won the toss and chose to field.

3 June 2009
13:30
Scorecard

Scotland; 128/9 (20 overs)	v	Netherlands; 130/3 (19.3 overs)
Kyle Coetzer 39 (28); Pieter Seelaar 3/25 (4 overs)		Alexei Kervezee 62 (59); Calum MacLeod 1/20 (4 overs)

Netherlands won by 7 wickets
The Oval, London
Umpires: Billy Bowden (NZ) and Daryl Harper (Aus)

- Netherlands won the toss and chose to field.

3 June 2009
17:30
Scorecard

West Indies; 144/6 (20 overs)	v	England; 145/1 (14.4 overs)
Ramnaresh Sarwan 46* (34); Graeme Swann 1/13 (2 overs)		Luke Wright 75 (48); Shivnarine Chanderpaul 1/17 (2 overs)

England won by 9 wickets
Lord's, London
Umpires: Billy Bowden (NZ) and Daryl Harper (Aus)

- West Indies won the toss and chose to bat.

3 June 2009
17:30
Scorecard

Pakistan; 158/6 (20 overs)	v	India; 159/1 (17 overs)
Misbah-ul-Haq 37 (30); Ishant Sharma 1/11 (3 overs)		Rohit Sharma 80 (53); Mohammad Amir 1/18 (3 overs)

India won by 9 wickets
The Oval, London
Umpires: Asad Rauf (Pak) and Billy Doctrove (WI)

- Pakistan won the toss and chose to bat.

4 June 2009
Scorecard

South Africa; 163/6 (20 overs)	v	Ireland; 133/6 (20 overs)
Graeme Smith 63 (41); Peter Connell 2/35 (4 overs)		Niall O'Brien 62 (52); JP Duminy 3/15 (4 overs)

South Africa won by 30 runs
Walker Cricket Ground, Southgate
Umpires: Colin Downey (Eng) and Norman Freeman (Eng)

- South Africa won the toss and chose to bat.

== Group stage ==
=== Group A ===
Team	Seed	Pld	W	L	NR	NRR	Pts
India (1)	A1	2	2	0	0	+1.227	4
Ireland (9)	A2	2	1	1	0	−0.162	2
Bangladesh (8)		2	0	2	0	−0.966	0

6 June 2009
18:00 (D/N)
Scorecard

India; 180/5 (20 overs)	v	Bangladesh; 155/8 (20 overs)
Gautam Gambhir 50 (46); Naeem Islam 2/32 (3 overs)		Junaid Siddique 41 (22); Pragyan Ojha 4/21 (4 overs)

India won by 25 runs
Trent Bridge, Nottingham
Umpires: Billy Bowden (NZ) and Simon Taufel (Aus)
Player of the match: Pragyan Ojha (Ind)

- India won the toss and elected to bat.

8 June 2009
13:30
Scorecard

Bangladesh; 137/8 (20 overs)	v	Ireland; 138/4 (18.2 overs)
Mashrafe Mortaza 33* (16); Trent Johnston 3/20 (4 overs)		Niall O'Brien 40 (25); Mashrafe Mortaza 2/30 (4 overs)

Ireland won by 6 wickets
Trent Bridge, Nottingham
Umpires: Nigel Llong (Eng) and Simon Taufel (Aus)
Player of the match: Niall O'Brien (Ire)

- Ireland won the toss and elected to field.
- Bangladesh were eliminated, India and Ireland qualified for the Super 8s as a result.

10 June 2009
17:30 (D/N)
Scorecard

Ireland; 112/8 (18 overs)	v	India; 113/2 (15.3 overs)
Andrew White 29 (25); Zaheer Khan 4/19 (3 overs)		Rohit Sharma 52* (45); Regan West 1/23 (4 overs)

India won by 8 wickets
Trent Bridge, Nottingham
Umpires: Ian Gould (Eng) and Nigel Llong (Eng)
Player of the match: Zaheer Khan (Ind)

- India won the toss and elected to field.
- Rain prior to the match delayed the start and shortened the game to 18 overs a side.

=== Group B ===
Team	Seed	Pld	W	L	NR	NRR	Pts
England (7)	B2	2	1	1	0	+1.175	2
Pakistan (2)	B1	2	1	1	0	+0.850	2
Netherlands (10)		2	1	1	0	−2.025	2

5 June 2009
17:30 (D/N)
Scorecard

England; 162/5 (20 overs)	v	Netherlands; 163/6 (20 overs)
Luke Wright 71 (49); Ryan ten Doeschate 2/35 (4 overs)		Tom de Grooth 49 (30); James Anderson 3/23 (4 overs)

Netherlands won by 4 wickets
Lord's, London
Umpires: Asoka de Silva (SL) and Steve Davis (Aus)
Player of the match: Tom de Grooth (Ned)

- Netherlands won the toss and elected to field.
- Adil Rashid, Eoin Morgan, James Foster, Rob Key (all Eng), Dirk Nannes, Alexei Kervezee and Bas Zuiderent (all Neth) made their T20I debuts.

7 June 2009
18:30 (D/N)
Scorecard

England; 185/5 (20 overs)	v	Pakistan; 137/7 (20 overs)
Kevin Pietersen 58 (38); Saeed Ajmal 2/23 (4 overs)		Younis Khan 46* (31); Stuart Broad 3/17 (3 overs)

England won by 48 runs
The Oval, London
Umpires: Billy Doctrove (WI) and Daryl Harper (Aus)
Player of the match: Luke Wright (Eng)

- Pakistan won the toss and elected to field.
- England go through to the Super 8 stage as a result of this match.
- Mohammad Amir (Pak) made his T20I debut and international debut.

9 June 2009
13:30
Scorecard

Pakistan; 175/5 (20 overs)	v	Netherlands; 93 (17.3 overs)
Kamran Akmal 41 (30); Pieter Seelaar 2/36 (4 overs)		Alexei Kervezee 21 (29); Shahid Afridi 4/11 (4 overs)

Pakistan won by 82 runs
Lord's, London
Umpires: Billy Doctrove (WI) and Amiesh Saheba (Ind)
Player of the match: Kamran Akmal (Pak)

- Pakistan won the toss and elected to bat.
- Netherlands were eliminated, Pakistan go through to the Super 8 stage as a result of this match.

=== Group C ===
Team	Seed	Pld	W	L	NR	NRR	Pts
Sri Lanka (6)	C2	2	2	0	0	+0.626	4
West Indies (11)	C1	2	1	1	0	+0.715	2
Australia (3)		2	0	2	0	−1.331	0

6 June 2009
14:00
Scorecard

Australia; 169/7 (20 overs)	v	West Indies; 172/3 (15.5 overs)
David Warner 63 (53); Dwayne Bravo 2/31 (4 overs)		Chris Gayle 88 (50); Mitchell Johnson 2/36 (3.5 overs)

West Indies won by 7 wickets
The Oval, London
Umpires: Aleem Dar (Pak) and Asad Rauf (Pak)
Player of the match: Chris Gayle (WI)

- Australia won the toss and elected to bat.

8 June 2009
17:30 (D/N)
Scorecard

Australia; 159/9 (20 overs)	v	Sri Lanka; 160/4 (19 overs)
Mitchell Johnson 28* (13); Ajantha Mendis 3/20 (4 overs)		Kumar Sangakkara 55* (42); Brett Lee 2/39 (4 overs)

Sri Lanka won by 6 wickets
Trent Bridge, Nottingham
Umpires: Billy Bowden (NZ) and Ian Gould (Eng)
Player of the match: Kumar Sangakkara (SL)

- Sri Lanka won the toss and elected to field.
- Australia were eliminated, Sri Lanka and the West Indies advance to the Super 8s as a result.
- Ricky Ponting's last T20I match.

10 June 2009
13:30
Scorecard

Sri Lanka; 192/5 (20 overs)	v	West Indies; 177/5 (20 overs)
Sanath Jayasuriya 81 (47); Lendl Simmons 4/19 (3 overs)		Dwayne Bravo 51 (38); Ajantha Mendis 2/25 (4 overs)

Sri Lanka won by 15 runs
Trent Bridge, Nottingham
Umpires: Billy Bowden (NZ) and Simon Taufel (Aus)
Player of the match: Sanath Jayasuriya (SL)

- West Indies won the toss and elected to field

=== Group D ===
Team	Seed	Pld	W	L	NR	NRR	Pts
South Africa (5)	D2	2	2	0	0	+3.275	4
New Zealand (4)	D1	2	1	1	0	+0.309	2
Scotland (12)		2	0	2	0	−5.281	0

6 June 2009
10:00
Scorecard

Scotland; 89/4 (7 overs)	v	New Zealand; 90/3 (6 overs)
Kyle Coetzer 33 (15); Ian Butler 3/19 (2 overs)		Jesse Ryder 31 (12); Ryan Watson 1/4 (1 overs)

New Zealand won by 7 wickets
The Oval, London
Umpires: Billy Doctrove (WI) and Daryl Harper (Aus)
Player of the match: Ian Butler (NZ)

- New Zealand won the toss and elected to field.
- Match reduced to 7 overs per side.

7 June 2009
13:30
Scorecard

South Africa; 211/5 (20 overs)	v	Scotland; 81 (15.3 overs)
AB de Villiers 79* (34); Majid Haq 2/25 (4 overs)		Kyle Coetzer 42 (32); Albie Morkel 2/15 (1.4 overs)

South Africa won by 130 runs
The Oval, London
Umpires: Asad Rauf (Pak) and Amiesh Saheba (Ind)
Player of the match: AB de Villiers (SA)

- Scotland won the toss and elected to field.
- Scotland were eliminated, South Africa and New Zealand go through to the Super 8 stage as a result.

9 June 2009
17:30 (D/N)
Scorecard

South Africa; 128/7 (20 overs)	v	New Zealand; 127/5 (20 overs)
Graeme Smith 33 (35); Ian Butler 2/13 (4 overs)		Brendon McCullum 57 (54); Roelof van der Merwe 2/14 (4 overs)

South Africa won by 1 run
Lord's, London
Umpires: Asad Rauf (Pak) and Daryl Harper (Aus)
Player of the match: Roelof van der Merwe (SA)

- New Zealand won the toss and elected to field.

== Super 8s ==
The Super 8s consisted of two groups: Group E and Group F. Group E consisted of A1, B2, C1, D2 and Group F consisted of A2, B1, C2, D1, where X1 is the first seed from Group X and X2 is the second seed from Group X. The seedings were based on performance in the last ICC T20 (2007). If a non-seeded team knocks out a seeded team, the non-seeded team inherits the seed of the team it knocked out.

Qualification	Super 8s	
Qualification	Group E	Group F
Advanced from Group Stage	England	Ireland
Advanced from Group Stage	India	New Zealand
Advanced from Group Stage	South Africa	Pakistan
Advanced from Group Stage	West Indies	Sri Lanka

=== Group E ===
Pos	Team	Pld	W	L	NR	Pts	NRR
1	South Africa	3	3	0	0	6	0.787
2	West Indies	3	2	1	0	4	0.063
3	England	3	1	2	0	2	−0.414
4	India	3	0	3	0	0	−0.466

Source: ESPNCricinfo

11 June 2009
17:30 (D/N)
Scorecard

England; 111 (19.5 overs)	v	South Africa; 114/3 (18.2 overs)
Owais Shah 38 (33); Wayne Parnell 3/14 (3.5 overs)		Jacques Kallis 57 (49); Stuart Broad 1/14 (3 overs)

South Africa won by 7 wickets
Trent Bridge, Nottingham
Umpires: Steve Davis (Aus) and Tony Hill (NZ)
Player of the match: Jacques Kallis (SA)

- England won the toss and elected to bat.

12 June 2009
17:30 (D/N)
Scorecard

India; 153/7 (20 overs)	v	West Indies; 156/3 (18.4 overs)
Yuvraj Singh 67 (43); Dwayne Bravo 4/38 (4 overs)		Dwayne Bravo 66* (36); Irfan Pathan 1/9 (2 overs)

West Indies won by 7 wickets
Lord's, London
Umpires: Aleem Dar (Pak) and Rudi Koertzen (SA)
Player of the match: Dwayne Bravo (WI)

- India won the toss and elected to bat.

13 June 2009
13:30
Scorecard

South Africa; 183/7 (20 overs)	v	West Indies; 163/9 (20 overs)
Herschelle Gibbs 55 (35); Jerome Taylor 3/30 (4 overs)		Lendl Simmons 77 (50); Wayne Parnell 4/14 (4 overs)

South Africa won by 20 runs
The Oval, London
Umpires: Aleem Dar (Pak) and Mark Benson (Eng)
Player of the match: Wayne Parnell (SA)

- West Indies won the toss and elected to field.

14 June 2009
17:30 (D/N)
Scorecard

England; 153/7 (20 overs)	v	India; 150/5 (20 overs)
Kevin Pietersen 46 (27); Harbhajan Singh 3/30 (4 overs)		Yusuf Pathan 33 (17); Graeme Swann 2/28 (4 overs)

England won by 3 runs
Lord's, London
Umpires: Steve Davis (Aus) and EAR de Silva (SL)
Player of the match: Ryan Sidebottom (Eng)

- India won the toss and elected to field.
- South Africa qualified for the semi-finals and India were eliminated as a result of this match.

15 June 2009
17:30 (D/N)
Scorecard

England; 161/6 (20 overs)	v	West Indies; 82/5 (8.2 overs)
Ravi Bopara 55 (47); Dwayne Bravo 2/30 (4 overs)		Ramnaresh Sarwan 19* (9); Adil Rashid 1/11 (1 over)

West Indies won by 5 wickets (D/L)
The Oval, London
Umpires: Aleem Dar (Pak) and Rudi Koertzen (SA)
Player of the match: Ramnaresh Sarwan (WI)

- England won the toss and elected to bat.
- Rain revised the West Indies' target to 80 runs from 9 overs according to the Duckworth–Lewis method.
- West Indies qualified for the semi-finals and England were eliminated as a result of this match.

16 June 2009
17:30 (D/N)
Scorecard

South Africa; 130/5 (20 overs)	v	India; 118/8 (20 overs)
AB de Villiers 63 (51); Suresh Raina 1/6 (1 over)		Rohit Sharma 29 (28); Johan Botha 3/16 (4 overs)

South Africa won by 12 runs
Trent Bridge, Nottingham
Umpires: Billy Bowden (NZ) and Ian Gould (Eng)
Player of the match: AB de Villiers (SA)

- South Africa won the toss and elected to bat.

=== Group F ===
Pos	Team	Pld	W	L	NR	Pts	NRR
1	Sri Lanka	3	3	0	0	6	1.267
2	Pakistan	3	2	1	0	4	1.185
3	New Zealand	3	1	2	0	2	−0.232
4	Ireland	3	0	3	0	0	−2.183

Source: ESPNCricinfo

11 June 2009
13:30
Scorecard

New Zealand; 198/5 (20 overs)	v	Ireland; 115 (16.4 overs)
Aaron Redmond 63 (30); Kyle McCallan 2/33 (4 overs)		Andre Botha 28 (17); Nathan McCullum 3/15 (3 overs)

New Zealand won by 83 runs
Trent Bridge, Nottingham
Umpires: Asoka de Silva (SL) and Marais Erasmus (SA)
Player of the match: Aaron Redmond (NZ)

- Ireland won the toss and elected to field.

12 June 2009
13:30
Scorecard

Sri Lanka; 150/7 (20 overs)	v	Pakistan; 131/9 (20 overs)
Tillakaratne Dilshan 46 (39); Saeed Ajmal 2/26 (4 overs)		Younis Khan 50 (37); Lasith Malinga 3/17 (4 overs)

Sri Lanka won by 19 runs
Lord's, London
Umpires: Mark Benson (Eng) and Rudi Koertzen (SA)
Player of the match: Tillakaratne Dilshan (SL)

- Sri Lanka won the toss and elected to bat

13 June 2009
17:30 (D/N)
Scorecard

New Zealand; 99 (18.3 overs)	v	Pakistan; 100/4 (13.1 overs)
Scott Styris 22 (29); Umar Gul 5/6 (3 overs)		Shahzaib Hasan 35 (28); Daniel Vettori 2/20 (4 overs)

Pakistan won by 6 wickets
The Oval, London
Umpires: Mark Benson (Eng) and Rod Tucker (Aus)
Player of the match: Umar Gul (Pak)

- New Zealand won the toss and elected to bat.
- Umar Gul became the first bowler to take five wickets in a Twenty20 international.
- Shahzaib Hasan (Pak) made his T20I debut.

14 June 2009
13:30
Scorecard

Sri Lanka; 144/9 (20 overs)	v	Ireland; 135/7 (20 overs)
Mahela Jayawardene 78 (53); Alex Cusack 4/18 (3 overs)		John Mooney 31* (21); Lasith Malinga 2/19 (4 overs)

Sri Lanka won by 9 runs
Lord's, London
Umpires: Marais Erasmus (SA) and Tony Hill (NZ)
Player of the match: Mahela Jayawardene (SL)

- Sri Lanka won the toss and elected to bat.
- Ireland were eliminated as a result of this match.

15 June 2009
13:30
Scorecard

Pakistan; 159/5 (20 overs)	v	Ireland; 120/9 (20 overs)
Kamran Akmal 57 (51); Kyle McCallan 2/26 (4 overs)		William Porterfield 40 (36); Saeed Ajmal 4/19 (4 overs)

Pakistan won by 39 runs
The Oval, London
Umpires: Rudi Koertzen (SA) and Rod Tucker (Aus)
Player of the match: Kamran Akmal (Pak)

- Pakistan won the toss and elected to bat.
- Pakistan qualified for the semi-finals as a result of this match.

16 June 2009
13:30
Scorecard

Sri Lanka; 158/5 (20 overs)	v	New Zealand; 110 (17 overs)
Tillakaratne Dilshan 48 (37); DL Vettori 2/32 (4 overs)		Martin Guptill 43 (34); Ajantha Mendis 3/9 (3 overs)

Sri Lanka won by 48 runs
Trent Bridge, Nottingham
Umpires: Steve Davis (Aus) and Simon Taufel (Aus)
Player of the match: Ajantha Mendis (SL)

- Sri Lanka won the toss and elected to bat.
- Sri Lanka qualified for the semi-finals and New Zealand were eliminated as a result of this match.

== Knockout stage ==
Semi-finals
18 June – Trent Bridge
South Africa	142/5 (20)
Pakistan	149/4 (20)
19 June – The Oval
Sri Lanka	158/5 (20)
West Indies	101 (17.4)

Final
21 June – Lord's
Pakistan	139/2 (18.4)
Sri Lanka	138/6 (20)

=== Semi-finals ===
18 June 2009
17:30 (D/N)
Scorecard

Pakistan; 149/4 (20 overs)	v	South Africa; 142/5 (20 overs)
Shahid Afridi 51 (34); JP Duminy 1/14 (2 overs)		Jacques Kallis 64 (54); Shahid Afridi 2/16 (4 overs)

Pakistan won by 7 runs
Trent Bridge, Nottingham
Umpires: Billy Bowden (NZ) and Steve Davis (Aus)
Player of the match: Shahid Afridi (Pak)

- Pakistan won the toss and elected to bat.

19 June 2009
17:30 (D/N)
Scorecard

Sri Lanka; 158/5 (20 overs)	v	West Indies; 101 (17.4 overs)
Tillakaratne Dilshan 96* (57); Dwayne Bravo 2/32 (3 overs)		Chris Gayle 63* (50); Angelo Mathews 3/16 (4 overs)

Sri Lanka won by 57 runs
The Oval, London
Umpires: Aleem Dar (Pak) and Rudi Koertzen (SA)
Player of the match: Tillakaratne Dilshan (SL)

- West Indies won the toss and elected to field.
- Dilshan scored 60.76% of Sri Lanka's runs, which was a new Twenty20 International record. However, this only stood for a matter of hours, as Chris Gayle scored 62.38% of West Indies' total.
- Chris Gayle became the first player in Twenty20 to carry his bat.

=== Final ===
21 June 2009
15:00
Scorecard

Sri Lanka; 138/6 (20 overs)	v	Pakistan; 139/2 (18.4 overs)
Kumar Sangakkara 64* (52); Abdul Razzaq 3/20 (3 overs)		Shahid Afridi 54* (40); Sanath Jayasuriya 1/8 (2 overs)

Pakistan won by 8 wickets
Lord's, London
Umpires: Daryl Harper (Aus) and Simon Taufel (Aus)
Player of the match: Shahid Afridi (Pak)

- Sri Lanka won the toss and elected to bat.

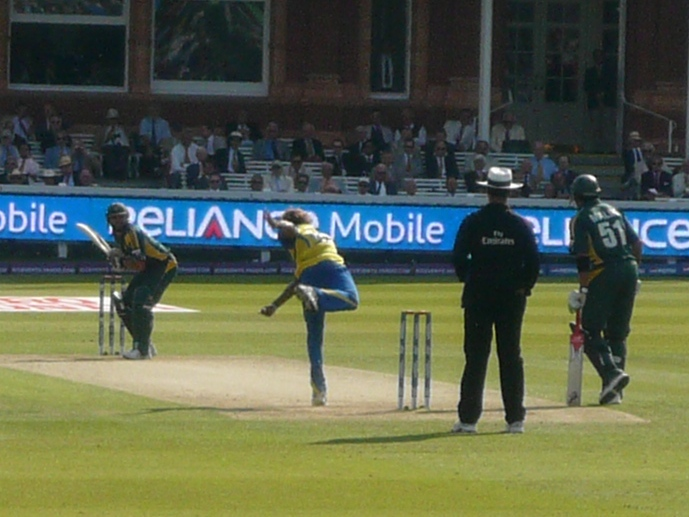
Lasith Malinga bowling from the Nursery End in the Final at Lord's.

In the final at Lord's, the home of cricket in London, Sri Lanka won the toss and elected to bat. The first over was bowled by Mohammad Amir. After failing to score off the first four balls – all short – Dilshan went for his scoop and mistimed it, resulting in him being caught at short fine-leg. Soon after this, Jehan Mubarak top edged a delivery by Abdul Razzaq which went high in the air and was caught by Shahzaib Hasan, leaving Sri Lanka at 2 for 2. Sanath Jayasuriya was able to stabilise the innings for Sri Lanka hitting 17 runs off 10 balls, however, Jayasuriya soon fell as he dragged a good length ball back on to the stumps. Mahela Jayawardene followed after edging a shot into the hands of Misbah-ul-Haq, leaving Sri Lanka on 32/4. Sangakkara and Chamara Silva added further runs, before the latter was caught by Saeed Ajmal playing a pull shot off the bowling of Umar Gul. Shahid Afridi soon after, took the wicket of Isuru Udana with a googly which drifted into the right-hander, knocking the off-stump. This brought in Angelo Mathews, who along with Sangakkara took the score from 70/6 to 138/6, with 17 runs being scored off the last over bowled by Mohammad Amir. Sri Lanka finished on 138/6 from 20 overs.

Pakistan started off well with openers Kamran Akmal and Shahzaib Hasan adding 48 runs for the 1st wicket, before Kamran Akmal was stumped by Kumar Sangakkara by the first delivery of Sanath Jayasuriya. Pakistan reached the target in 18.4 overs, with Shahid Afridi, who hit the winning runs, earning Man of the Match while Tillakaratne Dilshan was declared Man of the Series for his 317 runs at an average of 63.40. Pakistan's win, often cheered on by crowds of fans from England's Pakistani communities, marked its first world title since Imran Khan's "cornered tigers" had won the 1992 World Cup.

== Statistics ==
=== Most Runs ===
Tillakaratne Dilshan of Sri Lanka scored the most runs in the 2009 tournament (317 from 7 innings)

Runs	Player	Team
317	Tillakaratne Dilshan	Sri Lanka
238	Jacques Kallis	South Africa
193	Chris Gayle	West Indies
188	Kamran Akmal	Pakistan
186	AB de Villers	South Africa

Source: ESPNcricinfo

=== Most Wickets ===
Umar Gul of Pakistan took the most 13 wickets in the 2009 tournament (13 wickets from 24.3 overs)

Wickets	Player	Team
13	Umar Gul	Pakistan
12	Ajantha Mendis	Sri Lanka
12	Saeed Ajmal	Pakistan
12	Lasith Malinga	Sri Lanka
11	Shahid Afridi	Pakistan

Source: ESPNcricinfo
