= Sharjeel Khan =

Pakistani cricketer

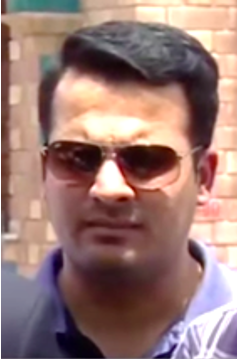
- Sharjeel Khan in 2017

Personal information
- Born: 14 August 1989 (age 37); Hyderabad, Sindh, Pakistan
- Batting: Left-handed
- Bowling: Right-arm leg break
- Role: Opening batter

International information
- National side: Pakistan (2013–2021)
- Only Test (cap 225): 3 January 2017 v Australia
- ODI debut (cap 196): 18 December 2013 v Sri Lanka
- Last ODI: 17 January 2017 v Australia
- ODI shirt no.: 98
- T20I debut (cap 57): 8 December 2013 v Afghanistan
- Last T20I: 3 August 2021 v West Indies

Domestic team information
- Years: Team
- 2005/06–2014/15: Hyderabad Hawks
- 2009/10–2012/13: Hyderabad
- 2011/12–2014/15: ZTBL
- 2016–2017: Islamabad United
- 2020–2023: Karachi Kings
- 2020–present: Sindh
- 2021–present: Mirpur Royals
- 2026: Hyderabad Kingsmen

Career statistics
Competition	Test	ODI	T20I	FC
Matches	1	25	21	89
Runs scored	44	812	406	5,587
Batting average	22.00	32.48	22.55	37.00
100s/50s	0/0	1/6	0/2	13/25
Top score	40	152	59	279
Balls bowled	–	–	–	531
Wickets	–	–	–	9
Bowling average	–	–	–	37.66
5 wickets in innings	–	–	–	0
10 wickets in match	–	–	–	0
Best bowling	–	–	–	3/19
Catches/stumpings	0/–	6/–	6/–	68/–
Medal record
Representing Pakistan
Men's Cricket
Asian Games
Bronze medal – third place	2010 Guangzhou	Team
- Source: ESPNcricInfo, 1 September 2022

Sharjeel Khan (Note: Urdu: شرجیل خان) (born 14 August 1989) is a Pakistani cricketer who plays for Hyderabad Kingsmen in the Pakistan Super League and for Sindh in the Pakistan domestic tournaments. He made his first-class debut for Hyderabad in the 2009–10 Quaid-e-Azam Trophy on 10 October 2009. He was banned for two and a half years in 2017 for his involvement in spot-fixing. In August 2019, his ban was lifted and he again became available for playing.

Known as an attacking opening batsman, he was a member of the bronze-medal team at the 2010 Asian Games in Guangzhou, China. He made his Twenty20 International (T20I) debut for Pakistan on 8 December 2013 against Afghanistan and his One Day International (ODI) debut on 18 December 2013 against Sri Lanka. In his debut ODI match he scored 61 runs from 61 balls. He was selected for the Pakistan squad for the 2016 ICC World Twenty20, where he was the highest run-scorer for his team. In February 2017, he was suspended and later banned for his part in the 2017 Pakistan Super League spot-fixing scandal.

== Early life ==
Sharjeel Khan was born in Hyderabad, Sindh into an Urdu-speaking family.

== Career ==
Sharjeel Khan made his first-class debut in 2009, scoring a hundred in the second innings. In his Twenty20 (T20) games he made two T20 centuries.

He was first called up for Pakistan during Sri Lanka's tour of the UAE in 2013. In his second match, a Twenty20 International (T20I) against Sri Lanka in Dubai, Khan made a promising 34 and suggested he could fix Pakistan's top-order conundrum. This was cemented in his third game, when he struck 50 off 25 balls against Sri Lanka. Khan became a regular in the Pakistan limited overs teams ever since his successful Pakistan Super League (PSL) in February 2016, where he made 299 runs (3rd highest) at 30.00. He also hit the most sixes in the inaugural PSL (19) and scored the first century for the PSL.

In September 2016, Khan earned his first Test call-up against New Zealand after impressing in the limited overs against England and West Indies.

After completing his five-year ban for breaching the Pakistan Cricket Board's Anti-Corruption code, he was given clearance by the board to resume club cricket. So, he will be part of the players draft for the fifth edition of PSL.

=== 2016 Pakistan Super League ===
Khan was part of Islamabad United's squad. He scored the first century of the tournament and 117 runs from 62 deliveries against Quetta Gladiators. He scored 300 runs in the tournament and finished the tournament as the third-leading run scorer.

=== Ireland (2016) ===
Khan scored his first century against Ireland at Malahide on 18 August 2016. His fifty came from 34 deliveries and century from 61 deliveries with a strike rate of 176.74. This century stands as the fourth-highest One Day International (ODI) score by a Pakistani, behind Fakhar Zaman (210*), Saeed Anwar (194) and Imran Nazir (160). His 150 also stands as the third-fastest of all time after AB de Villiers and Shane Watson.

=== 2017 Pakistan Super League spot-fixing ===
In February 2017, Khan was provisionally suspended under the Anti-Corruption Code of the Pakistan Cricket Board (PCB). This was part of an ongoing investigation into an organisation's alleged attempts to corrupt the 2017 Pakistan Super League. On 18 February, Khan, along with teammate Khalid Latif, was formally charged by the PCB for violating the anti-corruption code. On 20 March, he was summoned by the PCB Anti-Corruption tribunal for a hearing and was given until 5 May to submit a formal reply. On 30 August 2017, Sharjeel Khan was banned for 5 years from all forms of cricket after being found guilty on five counts in violation of the PCB's anti-corruption code. Two-and-a-half years out of the five-year sentence are suspended. Khan's ban took effect from when he was first suspended, on 10 February 2017. The Pakistan's dashing opening batsman Sharjeel Khan is all set to get back to the limelight cricket with the news of him being included in the drafts for the fifth edition of the Pakistan Super League (PSL). Playing his last game for Islamabad United in February 2017, Sharjeel missed two complete seasons of the tournament.

In December 2021, he was signed by the Karachi Kings following the players' draft for the 2022 Pakistan Super League.

In December 2022, he was signed by the Khulna Tigers for the 2022–23 Bangladesh Premier League.
