= 2008–09 Pentangular One Day Cup =

- Dates: 13 December 2008 – 24 December 2008
- Administrator(s): Pakistan Cricket Board
- Cricket format: List A
- Tournament format(s): Round Robin and Knockout Stage
- Host(s): (Pakistan) Karachi and Lahore
- Champions: Punjab Stallions
- Participants: 5
- Matches: 11
- Official website: Official website

The 2008–09 RBS Pentangular One Day Cup was the first edition of the Pentangular One Day Cup, a List A (limited overs) cricket tournament held in Pakistan. Five teams participated in the competition; four Pakistan provincial teams and one representing the capital. Punjab Stallions won the tournament by defeating Federal Areas Leopards in the final.
