= Khalid Latif (cricketer) =

Pakistani cricketer

Personal information
- Born: 4 November 1985 (age 41); Karachi, Pakistan
- Batting: Right-handed
- Bowling: Right-arm off break
- Role: Batsman

International information
- National side: Pakistan (2008–2016)
- ODI debut (cap 163): 30 January 2008 v Zimbabwe
- Last ODI: 31 January 2010 v Australia
- T20I debut (cap 29): 12 October 2008 v Zimbabwe
- Last T20I: 27 September 2016 v West Indies

Domestic team information
- Years: Team
- 2005–2015: Karachi Dolphins
- 2000/01: Karachi Blues
- 2000/01: Pakistan A
- 2000/01: Pakistan U-19
- 2016–2017: Islamabad United

Career statistics
Competition	ODI	T20I	FC	LA
Matches	5	10	111	71
Runs scored	147	142	6,640	2,816
Batting average	29.40	14.2	35.31	46.16
100s/50s	0/1	0/1	19/27	11/9
Top score	64	59	254*	204*
Balls bowled	–	–	513	60
Wickets	–	–	9	1
Bowling average	–	–	45.00	59.00
5 wickets in innings	–	–	0	0
10 wickets in match	–	–	0	0
Best bowling	–	–	3/22	1/9
Catches/stumpings	1/–	1/–	67/–	32/–
Medal record
Representing Pakistan
Men's Cricket
Asian Games
Bronze medal – third place	2010 Guangzhou	Team
- Source: ESPNcricinfo, 30 November 2013

Khalid Latif (Urdu: خالد لطیف; born 4 November 1985) is a Pakistani former cricketer who played as an opening batsman in international cricket for Pakistan. A right-handed opening batsman, he captained Pakistan during the country's 2004 Under-19 Cricket World Cup and the 2010 Asian Games bronze medal wins. In 2017, the Pakistan Cricket Board banned from Latif from playing cricket for five years and fined him ₨. 1 million over his involvement in the 2017 Pakistan Super League spot-fixing scandal. In 2023, a court in the Netherlands convicted Latif of attempting to provoke the murder of Dutch politician Geert Wilders, and sentenced him to 12 years in prison.

== Career ==
Khalid Latif was captain of the Pakistani side which won the Under-19 World Cup in 2004. He was the highest scorer for Pakistan at the 2004 U-19 World Cup, scoring 291 runs in eight innings. Latif made his One Day International (ODI) debut at Faisalabad against Zimbabwe in 2008 and the same year he made his Twenty20 International debut against Zimbabwe.

In November 2009, during the 1st ODI against New Zealand, he scored a patient 64 runs from 112 balls in a 138-run win at the Sheikh Zayed Stadium in Abu Dhabi.

In January 2010, during the 5th ODI at Perth against Australia, Latif was tackled from behind by a spectator who rushed onto the field. The ICC later asked Cricket Australia for a detailed report into the breach of security.

Latif captained the Pakistan cricket team in the 2010 Asian Games. He stated that his goal was to help his team win the gold medal in the games. However, he had to settle for a bronze, after losing to Afghanistan in the semi-finals. He was selected in the Pakistan squad for the 2016 ICC World Twenty20.

In 2016, Latif scored a fifty in a blistering knock to take his side to victory versus England in the only T20.

=== 2017 Pakistan Super League spot-fixing ===
On 10 February 2017, he was provisionally suspended under the Pakistan Cricket Board's (PCB) anti-corruption code as part of an ongoing investigation into an organisation's alleged attempts to corrupt the 2017 Pakistan Super League. On 18 February, Latif, along with teammate Sharjeel Khan, was formally charged by the PCB for violating the anti-corruption code.

On 20 September, Latif was banned for five years from all forms of cricket in a short verdict announced by a three-man PCB tribunal. He was also fined ₨. 1 million (c. US$9,489) and was found guilty of six major breaches of the PCB's anti-corruption code. Latif did not show up to hear the verdict being announced.

== Dutch caricature contest ==
In August 2018, he placed a bounty of ₨. 3 million (c. US$24,000) on Dutch far-right member of parliament Geert Wilders for planning to hold a caricature contest depicting Islamic prophet Muhammad. The contest was organized by Wilders in the parliamentary offices of his party and received more than 200 entries, to be judged by Albanian American cartoonist and former Muslim Bosch Fawstin. The contest was eventually cancelled due to safety concerns, but was held the next year.

On 29 August 2023, Latif had to stand trial in the Netherlands for placing a bounty on Wilders, for incitement, and for making threats. He refused to appear at the Schiphol Judicial Complex in Haarlemmermeer. The court of The Hague tried Latif in absentia and sentenced him to 12 years imprisonment, in a verdict on 11 September 2023.
