= Shahzaib Hasan =

Pakistani cricketer (born 1989)

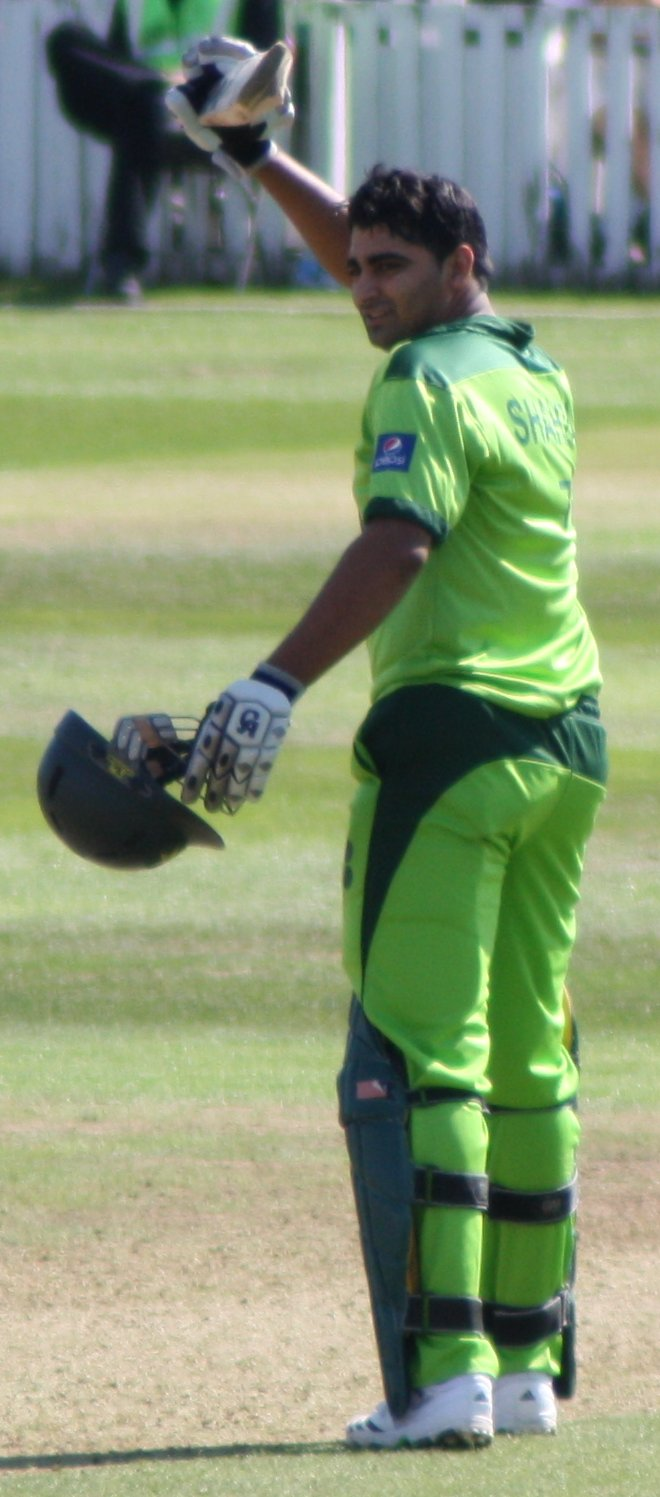

Personal information
- Full name: Mohammad Shahzaib Hasan Khan
- Born: 25 December 1989 (age 36); Karachi, Sindh, Pakistan
- Height: 1.83 m (6 ft 0 in)
- Batting: Right-handed
- Bowling: Off-break
- Role: Opening batsman

International information
- National side: Pakistan (2009–2010)
- ODI debut (cap 175): 15 June 2010 v Sri Lanka
- Last ODI: 8 November 2010 v South Africa
- T20I debut (cap 33): 13 June 2009 v New Zealand
- Last T20I: 27 October 2010 v South Africa

Domestic team information
- Years: Team
- 2008–2010: Karachi Zebras
- 2011–2015: Karachi Dolphins
- 2013: Duronto Rajshahi
- 2015: Dhaka Dynamites
- 2016: Karachi Kings
- 2016–2017: Karachi Blues

Career statistics
Competition	ODI	T20I	FC	LA
Matches	3	10	80	60
Runs scored	100	116	5,035	2,120
Batting average	33.33	11.60	34.25	36.55
100s/50s	0/1	0/0	9/27	5/12
Top score	50	35*	156	171
Balls bowled	–	–	797	224
Wickets	–	–	8	5
Bowling average	–	–	58.62	41.00
5 wickets in innings	–	–	0	0
10 wickets in match	–	–	0	0
Best bowling	–	–	2/9	2/27
Catches/stumpings	0/–	3/–	73/–	22/–
- Source: Cricinfo, 25 November 2013

Mohammad Shahzaib Hasan Khan (Urdu: محمد شاہ زیب حسن خان; born 25 December 1989) is a Pakistani former cricketer who played for Pakistan national cricket team between 2009 and 2010. He was part of the Pakistan squad that won the 2009 ICC World Twenty20.

After some notable limited overs performances opening the batting for Karachi Zebras (250 runs in seven games at a strike rate of 96.11), Hasan was one of two uncapped players in the Pakistan squad for the 2009 ICC World Twenty20. In February 2018, he was banned for one year, extended to four years after an appeal, for his part in the 2017 Pakistan Super League spot-fixing scandal.

== Career ==
After poor performances by Salman Butt at the start of the tournament, Shahzaib made his Twenty20 international debut on 13 June 2009 against New Zealand scoring 35 off 28 balls hitting 4 fours and 2 sixes. He maintained his place in the team, scoring 19 runs in the final against Sri Lanka as Pakistan went on to win the 2009 ICC World Twenty20.

After his performance in the Twenty20, he gained a lot of weight and was not chosen for touring in any formats of the game, however he was named in the 2010 Asia Cup squad along with many surprises such as Shoaib Akhtar, Asad Shafiq, Umar Amin and Abdur Rehman. He scored his maiden fifty against Bangladesh in his third ODI during the 2010 Asia Cup. He was then selected in the neutral test series against Australia in 2010. He was also selected for the ODI and Twenty20 series against England. Shahzaib Hasan then participated in the warm-up match against Somerset (just before the England series) and scored 105 runs and made a 169-run stand with Fawad Alam for the fourth wicket.

Shahzaib initially wasn't selected for the tour of South Africa in October 2010, but after pressure from captain Shahid Afridi, the team management of Waqar Younis, Aaqib Javed and Intikhab Alam the selectors added Shahzaib and fast-bowler Wahab Riaz to the ODI and Twenty20 squads. Shahzaib performed well in the 2010-11 Faysal Bank Twenty-20 Cup He scored 239 runs in the tournament and helped his new domestic team the Karachi Dolphins to the final of the tournament. He scored 33 runs in the final but couldn't stop Karachi Dolphins sliding to defeat as the Lahore Lions had scored 221 runs the Dolphins were bowled out for 184 with 4 deliveries left. Shahzaib's highest score during the tournament was 101* and he was the only person to score a century in the tournament.

=== PSL spot-fixing ===
In February 2018, Hasan was banned for one year and fined one million Pakistani rupees for his alleged role in 2017 Pakistan Super League spot-fixing scandal. In August 2018, his review appeal resulted in the ban being extended to four years and the fine upheld.
