= Nasir Jamshed =

Pakistani cricketer

Personal information
- Born: 6 December 1989 (age 36); Lahore, Punjab, Pakistan
- Height: 1.78 m (5 ft 10 in)
- Batting: Left-handed
- Bowling: Slow left-arm orthodox
- Role: Opening batsman

International information
- National side: Pakistan (2008–2015)
- Test debut (cap 210): 1 February 2013 v South Africa
- Last Test: 14 February 2013 v South Africa
- ODI debut (cap 160): 21 January 2008 v Zimbabwe
- Last ODI: 4 March 2015 v United Arab Emirates
- ODI shirt no.: 77
- T20I debut (cap 48): 5 September 2012 v Australia
- Last T20I: 22 November 2013 v South Africa

Domestic team information
- Years: Team
- 2005–2017: National Bank of Pakistan
- 2012: Chittagong Kings
- 2005–2014: Lahore Lions
- 2012: Ruhuna Royals
- 2015: Dhaka Dynamites

Career statistics
Competition	Test	ODI	T20I
Matches	2	45	18
Runs scored	51	1,443	363
Batting average	12.75	34.57	21.35
100s/50s	0/0	3/8	0/2
Top score	46	112	56
Catches/stumpings	1/–	12/–	6/–
- Source: ESPNcricinfo, 3 December 2013

Nasir Jamshed (Urdu: ناصر جمشید; born 6 December 1989) is a Pakistani former cricketer.

A left-handed opening batsman, he represented the Pakistan national cricket team in One Day International (ODI) and Twenty20 International (T20I) matches. In February 2017, he was suspended and later banned for one year for his part in the 2017 Pakistan Super League spot-fixing scandal. In August 2018, he was banned for a further ten years by an independent anti-corruption tribunal. In February 2020, he was jailed for seventeen months after pleading guilty.

== Youth and domestic career ==
Nasir made his first-class debut at the age of just 15 and was soon selected to the Pakistan Under-19 cricket team for a series against Sri Lanka, making 204 in the second innings on his debut. At Twenty20 level, he made his debut for the Lahore Lions in April 2005, at the age of 15 years and 140 days, making him the then youngest ever player to play in Twenty20 matches.

In the 2005–06 Quaid-e-Azam Trophy series he scored over 800 runs and earned selection in the Patron's XI side to play Zimbabwe. He made 182 runs and within a week was playing ODI cricket for Pakistan.

In 2009, playing for Lahore Lions, he along with veteran Abdul Razzaq set the highest 3rd wicket partnership ever in any forms of T20s (162).

== International career ==
=== Early career ===
In his debut against Zimbabwe, he opened the batting and smashed 61 off just 48 deliveries which saw him win the Man of the Match award. In his second ODI, he hit 74 off 64 balls, becoming only the third Pakistani to make consecutive half centuries in their first and second matches.

In the 2008 Asia Cup, Jamshed scored two consecutive half centuries, 53 runs against India before he was retired hurt and 52 not out against Bangladesh, at the National Stadium, Karachi. These performances strengthened his position as an opener in the Pakistani ODI squad. During the Asia Cup 2008, Jamshed's fitness was questioned by the commentators and he seemed visibly overweight. This lack of fitness also led him to miss the following Twenty20 tournament in Canada, and a 3-match ODI series against the West Indies. His exclusion from the national team continued in January 2009 when he was passed over for Khurram Manzoor during the Sri Lanka ODI series.

=== Success against India ===
He made his first one-day international century against India on 18 March 2012 in Bangladesh at Sher-e-Bangla National Stadium Mirpur at the 2012 Asia Cup. He scored 112 off just 104 balls and was involved in a 224 run partnership with Mohammad Hafeez, which is the second best opening partnership for Pakistan against any team and best partnership against India in one day internationals. They eclipsed Aamer Sohail and Saeed Anwar's record of 144 runs which was made in 1996.

During the ODI series of Pakistan tour of India in 2012/2013, Nasir hit two consecutive hundreds: a 132-ball 101 in the 1st ODI followed by 106 in the 2nd ODI, where he was declared Player of the Match. Added to his earlier century in Mirpur during the Asia Cup, he thus hit three consecutive ODI centuries against India, the only Pakistan batsman to do so against India since Zaheer Abbas in 1982/1983.

=== Decline ===
He had a poor ICC World Cup 2015 in which he was dismissed in the single figures thrice and frequently struggled with the pull shot.

== Personal life ==
Jamshed is married to a British citizen Samara Afzal who is based in Birmingham, England. They have a daughter.

== Controversy ==
=== Fixing allegations and bans ===
In February 2017 he was provisionally suspended under the PCB's Anti-Corruption Code as part of an ongoing investigation of the 2017 Pakistan Super League spot-fixing scandal, and was arrested by Britain's National Crime Agency shortly after. He was banned for one year by PCB on 11 December 2017.

In August 2018, he was banned for a further ten years by an independent anti-corruption tribunal. Jamshed also became ineligible to hold an official position in the Pakistan Cricket Board. In October 2018, an independent adjudicator upheld Jamshed's ban. In February 2019, Jamshed, along with two other men, pleaded not guilty at Manchester Crown Court in England, after they were accused of bribery relating to the Pakistan Super League. However, in December 2019 on the sixth day of his trial, Jamshed changed his plea to guilty. Initially Jamshed was the target of bribery but then acted as a go-between, encouraging others in return for money. In February 2020, Jamshed was jailed for seventeen months, after pleading guilty.
