= Zimbabwean cricket team in Pakistan in 1996–97 =

International cricket tour

	Pakistan	Zimbabwe
- Dates: 12 October – 3 November 1996
Captains	Wasim Akram	Alistair Campbell

Test series
- Result: Pakistan won the 2-match series 1–0
Most runs	Wasim Akram (292)	David Houghton (182)
Most wickets	Wasim Akram (11)	Paul Strang (6)
- Player of the series: Wasim Akram (Pak)

One Day International series
- Results: Pakistan won the 3-match series 3–0
Most runs	Ijaz Ahmed (166)	Grant Flower (174)
Most wickets	Saqlain Mushtaq (9)	Everton Matambanadzo (4)
- Player of the series: Wasim Akram (Pak); Grant Flower (Zim)

The Zimbabwe national cricket team toured Pakistan from October to November 1996 and played a two-match Test series against the Pakistan national cricket team. Pakistan won the Test series 1–0. Zimbabwe were captained by Alistair Campbell and Pakistan by Wasim Akram. In addition, the teams played a three-match One Day International (ODI) series which Pakistan won 3–0.

== Tour match ==
=== Three-day match: Pakistan Cricket Board XI vs Zimbabweans ===
12–14 October 1996
Scorecard

Zimbabweans	v	Pakistan Cricket Board XI
307/7d (83.5 overs); David Houghton 105; Shahid Nazir 3/42 (14 overs)		236/8d (64.4 overs); Azam Khan 70; Gavin Rennie 2/15 (2 overs)
203/8d (65 overs); Grant Flower 75; Mohammad Hussain 4/68 (29)		238/9 (64 overs); Mohammad Hussain 58*; Andy Whittall 5/97 (27 overs)

Match drawn
Montgomery Cricket Club Ground, Sahiwal
Umpires: Shakeel Khan (Pak) and Shakoor Rana (Pak)

- Zimbabweans won the toss and elected to bat.
- Hasan Raza (PCB XI) made his first-class debut.
- Azam Khan (PCB XI) scored his 4,000th first-class run.

== Test series ==
=== 1st Test ===
17–21 October 1996
Scorecard

Zimbabwe	v	Pakistan
375 (115.4 overs); Grant Flower 110 (287); Shahid Nazir 5/53 (22.4 overs)		553 (178.2 overs); Wasim Akram 257* (363); Paul Strang 5/212 (69 overs)
241/7 (100 overs); David Houghton 65 (115); Saqlain Mushtaq 4/75 (40 overs)

Match drawn
Sheikhupura Stadium, Sheikhupura
Umpires: Khizer Hayat (Pak) and Dave Orchard (SA)
Player of the match: Wasim Akram (Pak)

- Zimbabwe won the toss and elected to bat.
- Shahid Nazir (Pak) made his Test debut.
- Azam Khan (Pak) played his only Test.
- Wasim Akram (Pak) scored his only Test double century.
- Paul Strang (Zim) scored his only Test century.
- Grant Flower (Zim) scored his 1,000th Test run.
- Shahid Nazir became the third bowler to take a five-wicket haul on Test debut for Pakistan.

=== 2nd Test ===
24–28 October 1996 (Note: While five days of play were scheduled for each Test, the second Test reached a result in three days.)
Scorecard

Zimbabwe	v	Pakistan
133 (57.5 overs); Andy Flower 61 (144); Wasim Akram 6/48 (20 overs)		267 (79.1 overs); Saeed Anwar 81 (97); Bryan Strang 3/53 (18 overs)
200 (57.4 overs); David Houghton 73 (102); Waqar Younis 4/54 (15 overs)		69/0 (18.5 overs); Saeed Anwar 50* (66)

Pakistan won by 10 wickets
Iqbal Stadium, Faisalabad
Umpires: Doug Cowie (NZ) and Mahboob Shah (Pak)
Player of the match: Wasim Akram (Pak)

- Zimbabwe won the toss and elected to bat.
- At 14 years and 227 days, Hasan Raza (Pak) became the youngest player to make his Test debut. (Note: There is some doubt as to the validity of these records.)
- Mohammad Hussain (Pak) and Everton Matambanadzo and Pommie Mbangwa (both Zim) made their Test debuts.

== ODI series ==
=== 1st ODI ===
30 October 1996
Scorecard

Zimbabwe; 237/9 (50 overs)	v	Pakistan; 239/7 (49.1 overs)
Grant Flower 91 (94); Shahid Nazir 2/28 (7 overs)		Saleem Malik 72* (77); Andy Whittall 3/36 (10 overs)

Pakistan won by 3 wickets
Bugti Stadium, Quetta
Umpires: Khizer Hayat and Shakeel Khan
Player of the match: Saleem Malik (Pak)

- Zimbabwe won the toss and elected to bat.
- At 14 years and 233 days, Hasan Raza (Pak) became the youngest player to make his ODI debut.
- Gavin Rennie and Gary Brent (both Zim) made their ODI debuts.
- This was the first ODI match to be played at this ground.
- Wasim Akram (Pak) became the first bowler to take 300 ODI wickets.

=== 2nd ODI ===
1 November 1996
Scorecard

Zimbabwe; 195 (49.1 overs)	v	Pakistan; 196/1 (28.4 overs)
A Flower 51 (65); Saqlain Mushtaq 3/46 (10 overs)		Saeed Anwar 84* (79); John Rennie 1/28 (5 overs)

Pakistan won by 9 wickets
Gaddafi Stadium, Lahore
Umpires: Mahboob Shah and Shakoor Rana
Player of the match: Shahid Afridi (Pak)

- Zimbabwe won the toss and elected to bat.
- Azam Khan and Abdul Razzaq (both Pak) and Pommie Mbangwa (Zim) made their ODI debuts.
- Grant Flower (Zim) scored his 1,000th ODI run.

=== 3rd ODI ===
3 November 1996
Scorecard

Pakistan; 264/9 (40 overs)	v	Zimbabwe; 147 (32.1 overs)
Ijaz Ahmed 117 (105); Everton Matambanadzo 4/32 (8 overs)		Grant Flower 77 (96); Saqlain Mushtaq 4/28 (6.1 overs)

Pakistan won on faster scoring rate
Arbab Niaz Stadium, Peshawar
Umpires: Javed Akhtar and Shakoor Rana
Player of the match: Ijaz Ahmed (Pak)

- Pakistan won the toss and elected to bat.
- The match was reduced before play started to 40 overs per side.
- Zimbabwe's target was reduced to 225 runs in 34 overs.
- Zahoor Elahi (Pak) and Everton Matambanadzo (Zim) made their ODI debuts.
- Mark Dekker (Zim) played his final ODI match.
- Saqlain Mushtaq became the fifth bowler for Pakistan to take a hat-trick in ODIs.
- The match halted for a total of 81 minutes due to crowd trouble.
