= Lists of Pakistani cricketers =

These are lists of Pakistani cricketers

== Captains ==
- List of Pakistan national cricket captains

== Test ==
- List of Pakistan Test cricketers
- List of Pakistan Test wicket-keepers

== One-day International ==
- List of Pakistan ODI cricketers

== Twenty20 ==
- List of Pakistan Twenty20 International cricketers
