= List of Pakistan Test wicket-keepers =

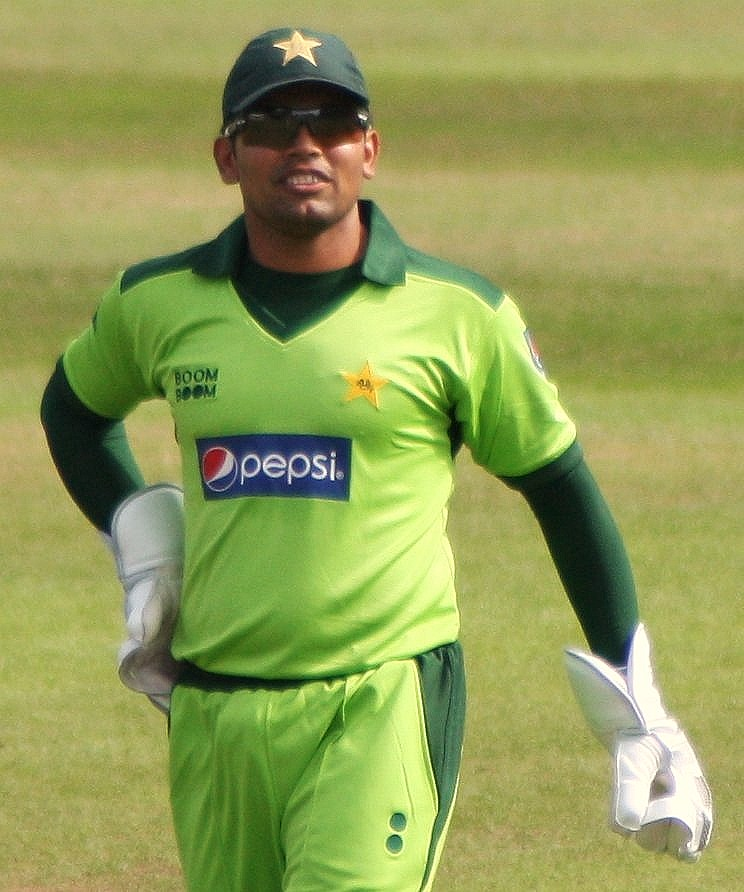
Kamran Akmal played 53 matches for Pakistan from 2002 to 2010

This is a chronological list of Pakistan Test wicket-keepers.

Pakistani wicket keeping has been stable over the years, with Pakistani selectors often unwilling to rotate players. As a result, several of these players have ended up captaining Pakistani sides in part because of their longevity in the team, such as Wasim Bari, Imtiaz Ahmed, Moin Khan and Sarfraz Ahmed. Wasim Bari is the longest-serving wicketkeeper for Pakistan.

Anil Dalpat is the only non-Muslim wicket-keeper who represented Pakistan.

| No. | Player | Span | Tests | Catches | Stumpings | Total dismissals |
|---|---|---|---|---|---|---|
| 1 | Hanif Mohammad | 1952 | 3 | 2 | 0 | 2 |
| 2 | Imtiaz Ahmed | 1952–1962 | 38 | 74 | 16 | 90 |
| 3 | Ijaz Butt | 1962 | 1 | 2 | 0 | 2 |
| 4 | Abdul Kadir | 1964 | 2 | 0 | 1 | 1 |
| 5 | Naushad Ali | 1965 | 6 | 9 | 0 | 9 |
| 6 | Wasim Bari | 1967–1984 | 81 | 201 | 27 | 228 |
| 7 | Shahid Israr | 1976 | 1 | 2 | 0 | 2 |
| 8 | Taslim Arif | 1980 | 5 | 6 | 3 | 9 |
| 9 | Saleem Yousuf | 1982–1990 | 32 | 91 | 13 | 104 |
| 10 | Ashraf Ali | 1982–1987 | 8 | 17 | 5 | 22 |
| 11 | Anil Dalpat | 1984–1985 | 9 | 22 | 3 | 25 |
| 12 | Zulqarnain Zaidi | 1986 | 3 | 8 | 2 | 10 |
| 13 | Nadeem Abbasi | 1989 | 3 | 6 | 0 | 6 |
| 14 | Moin Khan | 1990–2004 | 66 | 127 | 20 | 147 |
| 15 | Rashid Latif | 1992–2003 | 37 | 119 | 11 | 130 |
| 16 | Atiq-uz-Zaman | 2000 | 1 | 5 | 0 | 5 |
| 17 | Humayun Farhat | 2001 | 1 | 0 | 0 | 0 |
| 18 | Kamran Akmal | 2002–2010 | 53 | 184 | 22 | 206 |
| 19 | Sarfraz Ahmed | 2010–2019 | 49 | 146 | 21 | 167 |
| 20 | Zulqarnain Haider | 2010 | 1 | 2 | 0 | 2 |
| 21 | Adnan Akmal | 2010–2014 | 21 | 66 | 11 | 77 |
| 22 | Mohammad Salman | 2011 | 2 | 2 | 1 | 3 |
| 23 | Mohammad Rizwan | 2019–present | 15 | 37 | 1 | 38 |
