= Ausia =

Ausia may refer to

- Ausia, Bangladesh
- Ausia, Pakistan, village in Punjab province, Pakistan.
- Ausia (genus) with one species: Ausia fenestrata, an Ediacaran period fossil.
