= Billy Ibadulla =

Pakistani-New Zealand cricketer (1935–2024)

Billy Ibadulla MNZM
Personal information
- Full name: Khalid Ibadulla
- Born: 20 December 1935; Lahore, Punjab Province, British India
- Died: 12 July 2024 (aged 88); Dunedin, New Zealand
- Nickname: Billy
- Batting: Right-handed
- Bowling: Right-arm off break; Right-arm medium
- Relatives: Kassem Ibadulla (son)

International information
- National side: Pakistan (1964–1967)
- Test debut (cap 43): 24 October 1964 v Australia
- Last Test: 10 August 1967 v England

Domestic team information
- Years: Team
- 1953/54: Punjab
- 1954–1972: Warwickshire
- 1964/65–1966/67: Otago
- 1970/71–1971/72: Tasmania

Career statistics
Competition	Test	FC	LA
Matches	4	417	64
Runs scored	253	17,078	829
Batting average	31.62	27.28	16.91
100s/50s	1/0	22/82	0/2
Top score	166	171	75
Balls bowled	336	36,157	3,133
Wickets	1	462	84
Bowling average	99.00	30.96	23.86
5 wickets in innings	0	6	2
10 wickets in match	0	0	0
Best bowling	1/42	7/22	6/32
Catches/stumpings	3/–	14/–	13/–
- Source: ESPNcricinfo, 13 October 2011

Khalid "Billy" Ibadulla MNZM (20 December 1935 – 12 July 2024) was a Pakistani-New Zealander cricketer, cricket coach and umpire who later worked as a cricket commentator for TVNZ. He represented Pakistan four times at Test match level between 1964 and 1967, and was the first Pakistani to play in the County Championship.

Khalid Ibadulla was born in Lahore, the youngest of six children. His father, Masood, had been a noted field hockey player. He was introduced to cricket at the Lahore Gymkhana Club by his elder brother, and was attracted by the aesthetic beauty of the game. At Mozang High School, he was coached by former first-class wicket-keeper Nissar Ahmed.

== First-class career ==
After a few matches in Pakistan, where he made his first-class debut at the age of 16, Ibadulla played most of his cricket as a professional for Warwickshire County Cricket Club in England. He played for the side "with much distinction and no little charm" between 1954 and 1972, mostly as an opening batsman, and made over 400 top-level appearances for the county. He made 1,000 runs in a County Championship season six times, with a highest tally of 2,098 runs in 1962. His top score of 171 was made against Oxford University in 1961. He was also a useful and economical medium-pace change bowler, with best figures of 7 for 22 against Derbyshire at Chesterfield in 1967. In the first four seasons of the Gillette Cup, he took more wickets than any other Warwickshire bowler, and had the best economy rate.

On a flat Oval pitch in 1960 Ibadulla scored an unbeaten 170 for Warwickshire against Surrey, and put on 377 with Norman Horner for the first wicket on the first day, then the highest unbroken opening partnership in cricket history. He played for Otago from 1964–65 to 1966–67, and moved to New Zealand in 1976, living in Dunedin and working as a cricket coach.

== Test career ==
Although he had not played domestic first-class cricket in Pakistan for more than 10 years, Ibadulla was selected to play in the single Test against the visiting Australians in Karachi in October 1964. Opening the batting, he became the first Pakistan player to score a century on debut, before being dismissed at stumps for 166 after five and a half hours at the crease. The opening partnership of 249 with Abdul Kadir (95) is the highest in Test cricket for any wicket to involve two Test debutants and set a new record for Pakistan's highest Test match opening wicket partnership.

He declined an invitation to go on the subsequent tours of Australia and New Zealand, as the Pakistan authorities were unable to offer him the professional rates he was accustomed to, and he spent the time playing for Otago and coaching. He made 43 and 102 not out and took four wickets for Otago when they played the Pakistanis, and was later called up by Pakistan for the third Test, making 28 and 9.

He was also called into the Pakistan side for two Tests during their 1967 tour of England after dismissing the captain, Hanif Mohammad, for a duck while playing for Warwickshire against the touring side. He made only 47 runs in four innings and took one wicket in the first two Tests, and was not selected in the Test team again.

Ibadulla holds the record of playing most first-class games (217) before making a Test debut for Pakistan.

== Later career ==
Ibadulla coached some of New Zealand's top cricketers, including Glenn Turner, Ken Rutherford and Chris Cairns. He also taught briefly at St Dunstan's College in London, as a Physical Education teacher in the early 1970s. He was member of the BBC Radio commentary team for Test Match Special when Pakistan toured England in 1974.

He umpired first-class cricket in England in 1982 and 1983.

In the 2004 Queen's Birthday Honours, Ibadulla was appointed a Member of the New Zealand Order of Merit, for services to cricket.

Ibadulla was the subject of a long-running error in the Wisden records section. He was out handled the ball at Courtaulds, Coventry in 1963 when playing for Warwickshire against Hampshire and not obstructing the field as reported in the 1964 Wisden's report of the game and then repeated in the records section from 1967 until 2010.

== Personal life ==
Ibadulla, a Christian, met his German-born wife, Gertrud Delfs, in Birmingham, where they married 1959. They had two daughters and a son, Kassem.

In the 1993 general election, he stood in the Dunedin West electorate for the New Zealand First party, and came fourth out of six candidates. He died in Dunedin on 12 July 2024, at the age of 88.
