= Farooq Hamid =

Pakistani cricketer (1945–2025)

Personal information
- Born: 3 March 1945; Lahore, Punjab Province, British India (now Pakistan)
- Died: 3 April 2025 (aged 80)
- Batting: Right-handed
- Bowling: Right-arm fast-medium

International information
- National side: Pakistan
- Only Test (cap 48): 4 December 1964 v Australia

Domestic team information
- Years: Team
- 1961–62 to 1968–69: Lahore
- 1962–63 to 1969–70: PIA

Career statistics
Competition	Tests	First-class
Matches	1	43
Runs scored	3	546
Batting average	1.50	13.00
100s/50s	0/0	0/0
Top score	3	38
Balls bowled	184	5213
Wickets	1	111
Bowling average	107.00	25.21
5 wickets in innings	0	3
10 wickets in match	0	1
Best bowling	1/82	7/16
Catches/stumpings	0/–	27/–
- Source: ESPNCricinfo, 13 June 2017

Farooq Hamid (Urdu: فاروق حمید; 3 March 1945 – 3 April 2025) was a Pakistani cricketer who played in one Test match in 1964.

== Biography ==
A tall right-arm opening bowler, Farooq Hamid made his first-class debut in 1961–62, and toured England with the Pakistan Eaglets in 1963. He played two matches for Pakistan against the Commonwealth XI in 1963–64, when Alf Gover judged that he was one of the fastest bowlers in the world, but lacked accuracy.

Hamid toured Australia and New Zealand with the Pakistan team in 1964–65, playing his only Test against Australia in Melbourne. His only Test wicket was that of Ian Chappell, who was also playing his first Test match. Hamid continued playing first-class cricket in Pakistan until the 1969–70 season, when he retired owing to lack of encouragement or opportunity to play for his country.

His best first-class bowling figures came in the match against Wellington in 1964–65, when he bowled unchanged through the innings to take 7 for 16 and dismissed Wellington for 53. Playing for PIA against Peshawar in 1967–68, Hamid took 5 for 30 and 5 for 20.

Hamid was son of Olympian Major S. A. Hamid. His cousin Khalid Aziz also played first-class cricket in Pakistan and was a Test umpire. His sister Tahira Hamid helped to set up the Pakistan Women's Cricket Association in 1978. She was the inaugural secretary.

He worked for Pakistan International Airlines, and was for some years posted at Cairo. He died in Lahore in April 2025, aged 80.
