= Pakistani cricket team in the West Indies in 1992–93 =

International cricket tour

| | West Indies | Pakistan |
- Dates: 23 March – 6 May 1993
| Captains | Richie Richardson | Wasim Akram |

Test series
- Result: West Indies won the 3-match series 2–0
| Most runs | Desmond Haynes (402) | Basit Ali (222) |
| Most wickets | Courtney Walsh (12) | Waqar Younis (19) |
- Player of the series: Desmond Haynes (Win)

One Day International series
- Results: 5-match series drawn 2–2
| Most runs | Brian Lara (234) | Aamer Sohail (238) |
| Most wickets | Carl Hooper (6); Ian Bishop (6) | Wasim Akram (8) |
- Player of the series: -

The Pakistan national cricket team toured the West Indies from March to May 1993 and played a three-match Test series against the West Indies cricket team which the West Indies won 2–0. Pakistan were captained by Wasim Akram; West Indies by Richie Richardson. In addition, the teams played a five-match One Day International (ODI) series which was drawn 2–2 with the final game ending in a tie.

The tied ODI, fifty overs each, was played at Bourda, Georgetown, on 3 April and Pakistan batted first after winning the toss. They scored 244 for six in their fifty overs. In reply, the West Indies levelled the score off the final ball of the fiftieth over and had lost five wickets compared with the six lost by Pakistan. Normally, when scores are level, the match is awarded to the team losing the fewest wickets and so, under the rules, the West Indies would have won. However, the crowd invaded the field before play on the final ball was completed. A Pakistani fielder threw the ball to Wasim Akram at the bowler's end and he saw the chance of a run out at the striker's end if he could return the ball to the wicket-keeper, but, with the pitch already overrun by spectators, he had no chance of doing this and the batsman could not be run out. As a result, the match referee Raman Subba Row had to make a decision on the result and he adjudged the match a tie.

== Test series summary ==
=== First Test ===
16–18 April 1993
(5-day match)
Scorecard

| West Indies | v | Pakistan |
| 127 (38.2 overs); DL Haynes 31 (81); Ata-ur-Rehman 3/28 (9 overs) | | 140 (48.5 overs); Aamer Sohail 55 (92); IR Bishop 5/43 (15.5 overs) |
| 382 (97 overs); DL Haynes 143* (288); Wasim Akram 4/75 (27 overs) | | 165 (53.5 overs); Basit Ali 37 (91); CL Hooper 5/40 (11.5 overs) |

West Indies won by 204 runs
Queen's Park Oval, Port of Spain, Trinidad
Umpires: HD Bird (ENG) and SA Bucknor (WI)
Player of the match: DL Haynes (WI)

- West Indies won the toss and elected to bat.
- The match was scheduled for five days but completed in three.
- Basit Ali (PAK) made his Test debut.

=== Second Test ===
23–27 April 1993
(5-day match)
Scorecard

| West Indies | v | Pakistan |
| 455 (105.5 overs); DL Haynes 125 (206); Waqar Younis 4/132 (25.5 overs) | | 221 (76 overs); Basit Ali 92* (174); CA Walsh 4/56 (18 overs) |
| 29/0 (4.3 overs); DL Haynes 16* (20) | | 262 (f/o) (103.3 overs); Javed Miandad 43 (68); WKM Benjamin 3/30 (17 overs) |

West Indies won by 10 wickets
Kensington Oval, Bridgetown, Barbados
Umpires: LH Barker (WI) and HD Bird (ENG)
Player of the match: DL Haynes (WI)

- Pakistan won the toss and elected to field.
- 26 April was taken as a rest day.
- The match was scheduled for five days but completed in four.
- Aamer Nazir (PAK) made his Test debut.

=== Third Test ===
1–6 May 1993
(5-day match)
Scorecard

| West Indies | v | Pakistan |
| 438 (110.2 overs); CL Hooper 178* (247); Waqar Younis 5/104 (28 overs) | | 326 (115 overs); Inzamam-ul-Haq 123 (225); AC Cummins 4/54 (20 overs) |
| 153/4 (49 overs); DL Haynes 64* (160); Waqar Younis 4/23 (11 overs) |

Match drawn
Antigua Recreation Ground, St. John's, Antigua and Barbuda
Umpires: HD Bird (ENG) and SA Bucknor (WI)
Player of the match: CL Hooper (WI)

- West Indies won the toss and elected to bat.
- 3 May was taken as a rest day.
- There was no play on the final day.
- Nadeem Khan and Shakeel Ahmed (both PAK) made their Test debuts.

== One Day Internationals (ODIs) ==
The series was drawn 2-2, with one match tied.

=== 1st ODI ===
23 March 1993
Scorecard

| Pakistan; 223/6 (50 overs) | v | West Indies; 224/6 (44 overs) |
| Aamer Sohail 87 (167); CL Hooper 2/28 (8 overs) | | BC Lara 114 (116); Aamer Sohail 3/43 (9 overs) |

West Indies won by 4 wickets
Sabina Park, Kingston, Jamaica
Umpires: LH Barker and SA Bucknor
Player of the match: BC Lara (WI)

- West Indies won the toss and elected to field.
- Basit Ali (PAK) made his ODI debut.

=== 2nd ODI ===
26 March 1993
Scorecard

| Pakistan; 194/7 (45 overs) | v | West Indies; 196/5 (41 overs) |
| Aamer Sohail 47 (86); CA Walsh 1/30 (8 overs) | | BC Lara 95* (106); Aamer Nazir 3/43 (9 overs) |

West Indies won by 5 wickets
Queen's Park Oval, Port of Spain, Trinidad
Umpires: SA Bucknor and CE Cumberbatch
Player of the match: BC Lara (WI)

- West Indies won the toss and elected to field.
- The match was reduced from 50 to 45 overs per side.
- Aamer Nazir (PAK) made his ODI debut.

=== 3rd ODI ===
27 March 1993
Scorecard

| West Indies; 259/4 (45 overs) | v | Pakistan; 261/3 (43.1 overs) |
| PV Simmons 80* (112); Aamer Nazir 2/52 (8 overs) | | Inzamam-ul-Haq 90* (104); IR Bishop 1/49 (10 overs) |

Pakistan won by 7 wickets
Queen's Park Oval, Port of Spain, Trinidad
Umpires: SA Bucknor and CE Cumberbatch
Player of the match: Inzamam-ul-Haq (PAK)

- West Indies won the toss and elected to bat.
- The match was reduced from 50 to 45 overs per side.
- Nadeem Khan (PAK) made his ODI debut.

=== 4th ODI ===
30 March 1993
Scorecard

| Pakistan; 186/9 (50 overs) | v | West Indies; 148 (44.3 overs) |
| Basit Ali 60 (86); CA Walsh 2/34 (10 overs) | | JC Adams 27 (71); Wasim Akram 4/18 (7.3 overs) |

Pakistan won by 38 runs
Arnos Vale Playing Field, Kingstown, Saint Vincent and the Grenadines
Umpires: LH Barker and GT Johnson
Player of the match: Basit Ali (PAK)

- West Indies won the toss and elected to field.

=== 5th ODI ===
3 April 1993
Scorecard

| Pakistan; 244/6 (50 overs) | v | West Indies; 244/5 (50 overs) |
| Basit Ali 57 (69); CA Walsh 2/48 (10 overs) | | DL Haynes 82 (131); Aamer Nazir 1/28 (8 overs) |

Match tied
Bourda, Georgetown, Guyana
Umpires: LH Barker and CR Duncan
Player of the match: CL Hooper (WI)

- Pakistan won the toss and elected to bat.
- Under the playing conditions, West Indies should have won by losing fewer wickets. However, the referee declared a tie, because a crowd invasion impeded the fielding side while the last ball was still in play.

== Arrest of Pakistani players ==
Four Pakistani players (captain Wasim Akram, vice-captain Waqar Younis, Aaqib Javed and Mushtaq Ahmed), along with two female tourists and a local man, were arrested on a beach in Grenada on 8 April 1993 on charges of "possession of a controlled drug". They were later released on bail.
