= Pakistani cricket team in Bangladesh in 2021–22 =

International cricket tour

| | Bangladesh | Pakistan |
- Dates: 19 November – 8 December 2021
| Captains | Mominul Haque (Tests); Mahmudullah (T20Is) | Babar Azam |

Test series
- Result: Pakistan won the 2-match series 2–0
| Most runs | Litton Das (224) | Abid Ali (263) |
| Most wickets | Taijul Islam (10) | Sajid Khan (16) |
- Player of the series: Abid Ali (Pak)

Twenty20 International series
- Results: Pakistan won the 3-match series 3–0
| Most runs | Afif Hossain (76) | Fakhar Zaman (91) |
| Most wickets | Mahmudullah (3) | Mohammad Wasim (5) |
- Player of the series: Mohammad Rizwan (Pak)

The Pakistan cricket team toured Bangladesh in November and December 2021 to play two Test and three Twenty20 International (T20I) matches. The Test series was part of the 2021–2023 ICC World Test Championship. The fixtures for the tour were confirmed in September 2021. Pakistan last toured Bangladesh in April and May 2015.

Pakistan won the first T20I match by four wickets, and the second match by eight wickets to win the series with a game to play. Pakistan won the third T20I match by five wickets to win the series 3–0. Pakistan won the first Test by eight wickets. Despite rain washing out most of day two and all of day three of the second Test, Pakistan won by an innings and eight runs late on the fifth day to win the series 2–0.

== Squads ==
| Tests | | T20Is | |
| Bangladesh | Pakistan | Bangladesh | Pakistan |
|---|---|---|---|
| Mominul Haque (c); Khaled Ahmed; Taskin Ahmed; Yasir Ali; Litton Das (wk); Shakib Al Hasan; Mahmudul Hasan Joy; Mehidy Hasan; Nayeem Hasan; Nurul Hasan; Saif Hassan; Ebadot Hossain; Shadman Islam; Shohidul Islam; Taijul Islam; Abu Jayed; Mohammad Naim; Mushfiqur Rahim (wk); Rejaur Rahman Raja; Najmul Hossain Shanto | Babar Azam (c); Mohammad Rizwan (vc, wk); Mohammad Abbas; Shaheen Afridi; Sarfaraz Ahmed (wk); Fawad Alam; Abid Ali; Azhar Ali; Hasan Ali; Nauman Ali; Faheem Ashraf; Bilal Asif; Kamran Ghulam; Imam-ul-Haq; Sajid Khan; Zahid Mahmood; Mohammad Nawaz; Abdullah Shafique; Naseem Shah; Saud Shakeel | Mahmudullah (c); Nasum Ahmed; Taskin Ahmed; Akbar Ali; Yasir Ali; Parvez Hossain Emon; Mahedi Hasan; Nurul Hasan (wk); Saif Hassan; Afif Hossain; Shamim Hossain; Aminul Islam; Shohidul Islam; Shoriful Islam; Mohammad Naim; Kamrul Islam Rabbi; Mustafizur Rahman; Najmul Hossain Shanto | Babar Azam (c); Shadab Khan (vc); Iftikhar Ahmed; Sarfaraz Ahmed (wk); Shaheen Afridi; Asif Ali; Hasan Ali; Haider Ali; Shahnawaz Dahani; Shoaib Malik; Mohammad Nawaz; Usman Qadir; Haris Rauf; Mohammad Rizwan (wk); Khushdil Shah; Imad Wasim; Mohammad Wasim Jr; Fakhar Zaman |

Kamrul Islam Rabbi and Parvez Hossain Emon were both added to Bangladesh's squad for the third T20I match. Prior to the Test series, Khaled Ahmed and Shohidul Islam were both added to Bangladesh's squad for the first Test, with Taskin Ahmed and Shoriful Islam unavailable due to injury. Taskin Ahmed was later added to Bangladesh's squad for the second Test, along with Mohammad Naim. Saif Hassan was ruled out of Bangladesh's squad for the second Test after being diagnosed with typhoid.

== T20I series ==
=== 1st T20I ===
19 November 2021
14:00
Scorecard

| Bangladesh; 127/7 (20 overs) | v | Pakistan; 132/6 (19.2 overs) |
| Afif Hossain 36 (34); Hasan Ali 3/22 (4 overs) | | Khushdil Shah 34 (35); Taskin Ahmed 2/31 (4 overs) |

Pakistan won by 4 wickets
Sher-e-Bangla National Cricket Stadium, Dhaka
Umpires: Masudur Rahman (Ban) and Sharfuddoula (Ban)
Player of the match: Hasan Ali (Pak)

- Bangladesh won the toss and elected to bat.
- Saif Hassan (Ban) made his T20I debut.

=== 2nd T20I ===
20 November 2021
14:00
Scorecard

| Bangladesh; 108/7 (20 overs) | v | Pakistan; 109/2 (18.1 overs) |
| Najmul Hossain Shanto 40 (34); Shaheen Afridi 2/15 (4 overs) | | Fakhar Zaman 57* (51); Mustafizur Rahman 1/12 (2.1 overs) |

Pakistan won by 8 wickets
Sher-e-Bangla National Cricket Stadium, Dhaka
Umpires: Tanvir Ahmed (Ban) and Gazi Sohel (Ban)
Player of the match: Fakhar Zaman (Pak)

- Bangladesh won the toss and elected to bat.

=== 3rd T20I ===
22 November 2021
14:00
Scorecard

| Bangladesh; 124/7 (20 overs) | v | Pakistan; 127/5 (20 overs) |
| Mohammad Naim 47 (50); Mohammad Wasim 2/15 (4 overs) | | Haider Ali 45 (38); Mahmudullah 3/10 (1 over) |

Pakistan won by 5 wickets
Sher-e-Bangla National Cricket Stadium, Dhaka
Umpires: Tanvir Ahmed (Ban) and Masudur Rahman (Ban)
Player of the match: Haider Ali (Pak)

- Bangladesh won the toss and elected to bat.
- Shohidul Islam (Ban) and Shahnawaz Dahani (Pak) both made their T20I debuts.

== Test series ==
=== 1st Test ===
26–30 November 2021
Scorecard

| Bangladesh | v | Pakistan |
| 330 (114.4 overs); Litton Das 114 (233); Hasan Ali 5/51 (20.4 overs) | | 286 (115.4 overs); Abid Ali 133 (282); Taijul Islam 7/116 (44.4 overs) |
| 157 (56.2 overs); Litton Das 59 (89); Shaheen Afridi 5/32 (15 overs) | | 203/2 (58.3 overs); Abid Ali 91 (148); Mehidy Hasan 1/59 (18.3 overs) |

Pakistan won by 8 wickets
Zohur Ahmed Chowdhury Stadium, Chittagong
Umpires: Michael Gough (Eng) and Sharfuddoula (Ban)
Player of the match: Abid Ali (Pak)

- Bangladesh won the toss and elected to bat.
- Yasir Ali (Ban) and Abdullah Shafique (Pak) both made their Test debuts.
- Litton Das (Ban) scored his first century in Tests.
- Nurul Hasan replaced Yasir Ali as a concussion substitute for Bangladesh.
- World Test Championship points: Pakistan 12, Bangladesh 0.

=== 2nd Test ===
4–8 December 2021
Scorecard

| Pakistan | v | Bangladesh |
| 300/4d (98.3 overs); Babar Azam 76 (126); Taijul Islam 2/73 (25 overs) | | 87 (32 overs); Shakib Al Hasan 33 (54); Sajid Khan 8/42 (15 overs) |
| | | 205 (84.4 overs) (f/o); Shakib Al Hasan 63 (130); Sajid Khan 4/86 (32.4 overs) |

Pakistan won by an innings and 8 runs
Sher-e-Bangla National Cricket Stadium, Dhaka
Umpires: Michael Gough (Eng) and Sharfuddoula (Ban)
Player of the match: Sajid Khan (Pak)

- Pakistan won the toss and elected to bat.
- No play was possible after tea on day 1 due to bad light.
- Only 6.2 overs of play was possible on day 2 and no play was possible on day 3 due to rain.
- Mahmudul Hasan Joy (Ban) made his Test debut.
- Sajid Khan (Pak) took his first five-wicket haul in Tests.
- Shakib Al Hasan (Ban) scored his 4,000th run in Tests.
- World Test Championship points: Pakistan 12, Bangladesh 0.
