= Solar eclipse of March 20, 2034 =

Total eclipse

- Total eclipse
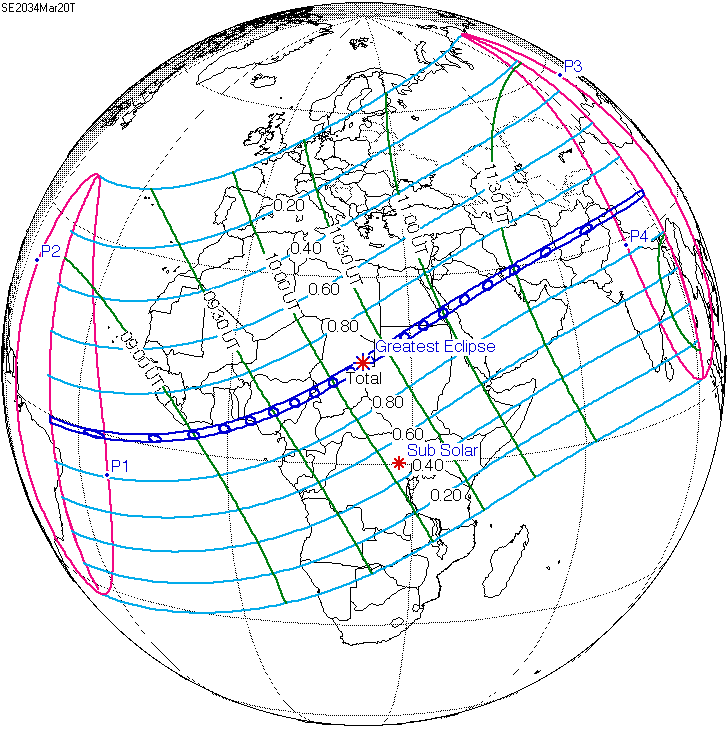
- Map
- Gamma: 0.2894
- Magnitude: 1.0458

Maximum eclipse
- Duration: 249 s (4 min 9 s)
- Coordinates: 16.1°N 22.2°E
- Max. width of band: 159 km (99 mi)

Times (UTC)
- Greatest eclipse: 10:18:45

References
- Saros: 130 (53 of 73)
- Catalog # (SE5000): 9583

A total solar eclipse will occur at the Moon's descending node of orbit on Monday, March 20, 2034, with a magnitude of 1.0458. A solar eclipse occurs when the Moon passes between Earth and the Sun, thereby totally or partly obscuring the image of the Sun for a viewer on Earth. A total solar eclipse occurs when the Moon's apparent diameter is larger than the Sun's, blocking all direct sunlight, turning day into darkness. Totality occurs in a narrow path across Earth's surface, with the partial solar eclipse visible over a surrounding region thousands of kilometres wide. Occurring about 1.3 days before perigee (on March 21, 2034, at 18:15 UTC), the Moon's apparent diameter will be larger.

Totality will be visible from the extreme southern tip of Benin, Nigeria, northern Cameroon, Chad, Sudan, Egypt, Saudi Arabia, Kuwait, Iran, Afghanistan, Pakistan, northern India, and western China. A partial eclipse will be visible for parts of eastern Brazil, Africa, Europe, the Middle East, Central Asia, and South Asia. Coincidentally, the eclipse passes through many Islamic countries around the date of Islamic New Year (estimated around March 20–21 according to local traditions, time zone and atmospheric conditions), and also passes through Iran only a few hours before the vernal equinox, marking the beginning of the Persian New Year. Since the Islamic lunar year is 11–12 days shorter than the solar year that the Iranian calendar observes, the Islamic New Year rotates through the seasons of the year, while the Persian one is on nearly fixed date on Gregorian calendar. In addition, the March 2034 solar eclipse is expected to be the longest total solar eclipse since 1894.

== Images ==
Animated path

== Eclipse timing ==
=== Places experiencing total eclipse ===
Solar Eclipse of March 20, 2034 (Local Times)
Country or territory	City or place	Start of partial eclipse	Start of total eclipse	Maximum eclipse	End of total eclipse	End of partial eclipse	Duration of totality (min:s)	Duration of eclipse (hr:min)	Maximum magnitude
Nigeria	Lagos	09:02:20	10:18:37	10:20:00	10:21:22	11:48:04	2:45	2:46	1.0088
Nigeria	Benin City	09:04:55	10:23:17	10:24:15	10:25:12	11:53:41	1:55	2:49	1.0036
Nigeria	Akure	09:05:30	10:23:16	10:24:41	10:26:07	11:54:00	2:51	2:49	1.009
Nigeria	Lokoja	09:08:10	10:26:56	10:28:36	10:30:18	11:58:51	3:22	2:51	1.0137
Nigeria	Makurdi	09:10:32	10:31:05	10:32:16	10:33:27	12:03:24	2:22	2:53	1.0053
Nigeria	Lafia	09:11:32	10:31:34	10:33:24	10:35:14	12:04:35	3:40	2:53	1.0181
Nigeria	Gombe	09:17:59	10:40:38	10:42:00	10:43:22	12:14:17	2:44	2:56	1.0068
Cameroon	Maroua	09:23:39	10:49:35	10:49:50	10:50:05	12:23:00	0:30	2:59	1.0004
Chad	N'Djamena	09:27:11	10:52:04	10:53:58	10:55:54	12:27:08	3:50	3:00	1.0159
Saudi Arabia	Hafar Al-Batin	12:58:55	14:21:46	14:22:48	14:23:50	15:38:54	2:04	2:40	1.005
Iran	Bushehr	13:39:25	14:59:51	15:00:42	15:01:32	16:13:48	1:41	2:34	1.0036
Iran	Shiraz	13:43:13	15:02:02	15:03:18	15:04:34	16:15:14	2:32	2:32	1.0097
Afghanistan	Farah	15:00:50	16:13:23	16:14:36	16:15:49	17:20:49	2:26	2:20	1.0134
Afghanistan	Ghazni	15:09:38	16:18:43	16:19:39	16:20:36	17:22:43	1:53	2:13	1.008
Afghanistan	Khost	15:11:32	16:19:41	16:20:48	16:21:55	17:23:12	2:14	2:12	1.0152
Pakistan	Peshawar	15:43:20	16:50:48	16:51:37	16:52:25	17:53:15	1:37	2:10	1.0058
Pakistan	Charsadda	15:43:31	16:51:13	16:51:40	16:52:08	17:53:12	0:55	2:10	1.0019
Pakistan	Attock	15:44:17	16:51:07	16:52:12	16:53:17	17:53:30	2:10	2:09	1.016
Pakistan	Mansehra	15:45:04	16:52:09	16:52:27	16:52:44	17:53:21	0:35	2:08	1.001
Pakistan	Havelian	15:45:05	16:51:35	16:52:33	16:53:30	17:53:29	1:55	2:08	1.0096
Pakistan	Muzaffarabad	15:45:21	16:52:18	16:52:35	16:52:52	17:53:23	0:34	2:08	1.001
Pakistan	Islamabad	15:45:04	16:51:34	16:52:38	16:53:42	17:53:38	2:08	2:09	1.0149
Pakistan	Rawalpindi	15:45:05	16:51:39	16:52:40	16:53:40	17:53:41	2:01	2:09	1.0116
Pakistan	Ausia	15:45:26	16:51:43	16:52:45	16:53:46	17:53:33	2:03	2:08	1.0125
India	Baramulla	16:16:18	17:22:13	17:23:08	17:24:01	18:23:34	1:48	2:07	1.0084
India	Sopore	16:16:24	17:22:21	17:23:09	17:23:57	18:23:32	1:36	2:07	1.0064
India	Srinagar	16:16:49	17:22:24	17:23:26	17:24:27	18:23:41	2:03	2:07	1.014
India	Shopian	16:16:56	17:22:40	17:23:35	17:24:30	18:23:51	1:50	2:07	1.0091
India	Anantnag	16:17:15	17:22:50	17:23:44	17:24:38	18:23:52	1:48	2:07	1.0087
India	Leh	16:19:26	17:23:41	17:24:41	17:25:40	18:23:48	1:59	2:04	1.0153

=== Places experiencing partial eclipse ===
Solar Eclipse of March 20, 2034 (Local Times)
Country or territory	City or place	Start of partial eclipse	Maximum eclipse	End of partial eclipse	Duration of eclipse (hr:min)	Maximum coverage
Brazil	Fortaleza	05:38:11 (sunrise)	05:40:20	06:35:04	0:57	88.56%
Liberia	Monrovia	07:51:02	08:58:09	10:15:02	2:24	85.75%
Ivory Coast	Yamoussoukro	07:54:56	09:06:02	10:27:31	2:33	89.49%
Ivory Coast	Abidjan	07:54:04	09:06:04	10:28:36	2:35	96.30%
Ghana	Accra	07:57:35	09:12:26	10:37:56	2:40	99.71%
Togo	Lomé	07:59:40	09:15:40	10:42:16	2:43	99.62%
São Tomé and Príncipe	São Tomé	08:00:56	09:18:20	10:45:31	2:45	77.86%
Benin	Porto-Novo	09:01:34	10:18:41	11:46:17	2:45	99.98%
Equatorial Guinea	Malabo	09:06:29	10:27:00	11:57:03	2:51	87.07%
Nigeria	Abuja	09:10:53	10:32:03	12:02:42	2:52	99.16%
Cameroon	Yaoundé	09:10:52	10:33:00	12:03:53	2:53	82.66%
Cameroon	Garoua	09:20:13	10:45:34	12:18:31	2:58	98.16%
Chad	Abéché	09:41:01	11:10:57	12:43:57	3:03	98.79%
Sudan	Khartoum	11:11:44	12:43:05	14:10:40	2:59	81.03%
Egypt	Cairo	11:31:07	12:55:48	14:16:45	2:46	73.28%
Iraq	Baghdad	13:00:46	14:21:39	15:35:55	2:35	81.20%
Saudi Arabia	Riyadh	12:57:34	14:22:25	15:38:56	2:41	90.20%
Kuwait	Kuwait City	13:03:54	14:26:23	15:41:00	2:37	99.84%
Bahrain	Manama	13:07:24	14:29:36	15:43:18	2:36	91.27%
Qatar	Doha	13:09:05	14:30:48	15:43:52	2:35	86.40%
Iran	Tehran	13:45:08	15:01:52	16:11:47	2:27	80.26%
United Arab Emirates	Dubai	14:17:22	15:36:25	16:46:51	2:29	81.99%
Turkmenistan	Ashgabat	15:26:58	16:39:22	17:45:17	2:18	77.97%
Uzbekistan	Tashkent	15:40:38	16:46:28	17:46:48	2:06	71.91%
Tajikistan	Dushanbe	15:39:55	16:47:43	17:49:25	2:10	82.19%
Afghanistan	Kabul	15:10:28	16:19:50	17:22:26	2:12	98.17%
Pakistan	Lahore	15:47:04	16:54:08	17:54:33	2:07	93.62%
India	New Delhi	16:21:30	17:26:32	18:24:58	2:03	80.38%
China	Lhasa	19:01:08	19:59:23	20:06:40 (sunset)	1:06	82.05%
Nepal	Kathmandu	16:44:07	17:44:35	18:14:51 (sunset)	1:31	74.64%

== Eclipse details ==
Shown below are two tables displaying details about this particular solar eclipse. The first table outlines times at which the Moon's penumbra or umbra attains the specific parameter, and the second table describes various other parameters pertaining to this eclipse.

March 20, 2034 Solar Eclipse Times
Event	Time (UTC)
First Penumbral External Contact	2034 March 20 at 07:41:11.9 UTC
First Umbral External Contact	2034 March 20 at 08:38:09.7 UTC
First Central Line	2034 March 20 at 08:38:58.0 UTC
First Umbral Internal Contact	2034 March 20 at 08:39:46.4 UTC
First Penumbral Internal Contact	2034 March 20 at 09:41:21.7 UTC
Ecliptic Conjunction	2034 March 20 at 10:15:45.2 UTC
Greatest Eclipse	2034 March 20 at 10:18:45.2 UTC
Greatest Duration	2034 March 20 at 10:19:41.8 UTC
Equatorial Conjunction	2034 March 20 at 10:28:24.9 UTC
Last Penumbral Internal Contact	2034 March 20 at 10:55:53.9 UTC
Last Umbral Internal Contact	2034 March 20 at 11:57:34.8 UTC
Last Central Line	2034 March 20 at 11:58:24.9 UTC
Last Umbral External Contact	2034 March 20 at 11:59:14.9 UTC
Last Penumbral External Contact	2034 March 20 at 12:56:10.5 UTC

March 20, 2034 Solar Eclipse Parameters
Parameter	Value
Eclipse Magnitude	1.04582
Eclipse Obscuration	1.09374
Gamma	0.28942
Sun Right Ascension	23h59m32.7s
Sun Declination	-00°02'58.0"
Sun Semi-Diameter	16'03.7"
Sun Equatorial Horizontal Parallax	08.8"
Moon Right Ascension	23h59m11.3s
Moon Declination	+00°13'42.6"
Moon Semi-Diameter	16'31.6"
Moon Equatorial Horizontal Parallax	1°00'39.3"
ΔT	75.7 s

== Characteristics ==
=== Eclipse path intersections ===
The path of the March 30, 2034 eclipse will cross the path of another solar eclipse less than 7 years earlier, the August 2027 solar eclipse, at a location on the southeastern coast of Egypt. This is similar to the intersection in the paths of the August 2017 and April 2024 total solar eclipses in the United States, over southern Illinois, and in Turkey during the August 1999 and March 2006 solar eclipses; the intersections within these pairs of total eclipses also occurred about 7 years apart. This phenomenon is considered to be unusual, since the average interval for any given spot on Earth to observe a total solar eclipse is about once every 375 years. The intersection patterns are caused by the dynamics of the Saros cycle.

== Eclipse season ==
This eclipse is part of an eclipse season, a period, roughly every six months, when eclipses occur. Only two (or occasionally three) eclipse seasons occur each year, and each season lasts about 35 days and repeats just short of six months (173 days) later; thus two full eclipse seasons always occur each year. Either two or three eclipses happen each eclipse season. In the sequence below, each eclipse is separated by a fortnight.

Eclipse season of March–April 2034
March 20 Descending node (new moon)	April 3 Ascending node (full moon)
Total solar eclipse Solar Saros 130	Penumbral lunar eclipse Lunar Saros 142

== Related eclipses ==
=== Eclipses in 2034 ===
- A total solar eclipse on March 20.
- A penumbral lunar eclipse on April 3.
- An annular solar eclipse on September 12.
- A partial lunar eclipse on September 28.

=== Metonic ===
- Preceded by: Solar eclipse of June 1, 2030
- Followed by: Solar eclipse of January 5, 2038

=== Tzolkinex ===
- Preceded by: Solar eclipse of February 6, 2027
- Followed by: Solar eclipse of April 30, 2041

=== Half-Saros ===
- Preceded by: Lunar eclipse of March 14, 2025
- Followed by: Lunar eclipse of March 25, 2043

=== Tritos ===
- Preceded by: Solar eclipse of April 20, 2023
- Followed by: Solar eclipse of February 16, 2045

=== Solar Saros 130 ===
- Preceded by: Solar eclipse of March 9, 2016
- Followed by: Solar eclipse of March 30, 2052

=== Inex ===
- Preceded by: Solar eclipse of April 8, 2005
- Followed by: Solar eclipse of February 28, 2063

=== Triad ===
- Preceded by: Solar eclipse of May 20, 1947
- Followed by: Solar eclipse of January 19, 2121

=== Solar eclipses of 2033–2036 ===
This eclipse is a member of a semester series. An eclipse in a semester series of solar eclipses repeats approximately every 177 days and 4 hours (a semester) at alternating nodes of the Moon's orbit.

The partial solar eclipse on July 23, 2036 occurs in the next lunar year eclipse set.

Solar eclipse series sets from 2033 to 2036
Descending node			Ascending node		
Saros	Map	Gamma	Saros	Map	Gamma
120	March 30, 2033 Total	0.9778	125	September 23, 2033 Partial	−1.1583
130	March 20, 2034 Total	0.2894	135	September 12, 2034 Annular	−0.3936
140	March 9, 2035 Annular	−0.4368	145	September 2, 2035 Total	0.3727
150	February 27, 2036 Partial	−1.1942	155	August 21, 2036 Partial	1.0825

=== Saros 130 ===
This eclipse is a part of Saros series 130, repeating every 18 years, 11 days, and containing 73 events. The series started with a partial solar eclipse on August 20, 1096. It contains total eclipses from April 5, 1475 through July 18, 2232. There are no annular or hybrid eclipses in this set. The series ends at member 73 as a partial eclipse on October 25, 2394. Its eclipses are tabulated in three columns; every third eclipse in the same column is one exeligmos apart, so they all cast shadows over approximately the same parts of the Earth.

The longest duration of totality was produced by member 30 at 6 minutes, 41 seconds on July 11, 1619. All eclipses in this series occur at the Moon’s descending node of orbit.

Series members 41–62 occur between 1801 and 2200:
41	42	43
November 9, 1817	November 20, 1835	November 30, 1853
44	45	46
December 12, 1871	December 22, 1889	January 3, 1908
47	48	49
January 14, 1926	January 25, 1944	February 5, 1962
50	51	52
February 16, 1980	February 26, 1998	March 9, 2016
53	54	55
March 20, 2034	March 30, 2052	April 11, 2070
56	57	58
April 21, 2088	May 3, 2106	May 14, 2124
59	60	61
May 25, 2142	June 4, 2160	June 16, 2178
62
June 26, 2196

=== Metonic series ===
The metonic series repeats eclipses every 19 years (6939.69 days), lasting about 5 cycles. Eclipses occur in nearly the same calendar date. In addition, the octon subseries repeats 1/5 of that or every 3.8 years (1387.94 days). All eclipses in this table occur at the Moon's descending node.

22 eclipse events between June 1, 2011 and October 24, 2098
May 31–June 1	March 19–20	January 5–6	October 24–25	August 12–13
118	120	122	124	126
June 1, 2011	March 20, 2015	January 6, 2019	October 25, 2022	August 12, 2026
128	130	132	134	136
June 1, 2030	March 20, 2034	January 5, 2038	October 25, 2041	August 12, 2045
138	140	142	144	146
May 31, 2049	March 20, 2053	January 5, 2057	October 24, 2060	August 12, 2064
148	150	152	154	156
May 31, 2068	March 19, 2072	January 6, 2076	October 24, 2079	August 13, 2083
158	160	162	164	
June 1, 2087			October 24, 2098	

=== Tritos series ===
This eclipse is a part of a tritos cycle, repeating at alternating nodes every 135 synodic months (≈ 3986.63 days, or 11 years minus 1 month). Their appearance and longitude are irregular due to a lack of synchronization with the anomalistic month (period of perigee), but groupings of 3 tritos cycles (≈ 33 years minus 3 months) come close (≈ 434.044 anomalistic months), so eclipses are similar in these groupings.

Series members between 1801 and 2200
January 1, 1805 (Saros 109)		October 31, 1826 (Saros 111)		August 28, 1848 (Saros 113)
July 29, 1859 (Saros 114)	June 28, 1870 (Saros 115)	May 27, 1881 (Saros 116)	April 26, 1892 (Saros 117)	March 29, 1903 (Saros 118)
February 25, 1914 (Saros 119)	January 24, 1925 (Saros 120)	December 25, 1935 (Saros 121)	November 23, 1946 (Saros 122)	October 23, 1957 (Saros 123)
September 22, 1968 (Saros 124)	August 22, 1979 (Saros 125)	July 22, 1990 (Saros 126)	June 21, 2001 (Saros 127)	May 20, 2012 (Saros 128)
April 20, 2023 (Saros 129)	March 20, 2034 (Saros 130)	February 16, 2045 (Saros 131)	January 16, 2056 (Saros 132)	December 17, 2066 (Saros 133)
November 15, 2077 (Saros 134)	October 14, 2088 (Saros 135)	September 14, 2099 (Saros 136)	August 15, 2110 (Saros 137)	July 14, 2121 (Saros 138)
June 13, 2132 (Saros 139)	May 14, 2143 (Saros 140)	April 12, 2154 (Saros 141)	March 12, 2165 (Saros 142)	February 10, 2176 (Saros 143)
January 9, 2187 (Saros 144)	December 9, 2197 (Saros 145)			

=== Inex series ===
This eclipse is a part of the long period inex cycle, repeating at alternating nodes, every 358 synodic months (≈ 10,571.95 days, or 29 years minus 20 days). Their appearance and longitude are irregular due to a lack of synchronization with the anomalistic month (period of perigee). However, groupings of 3 inex cycles (≈ 87 years minus 2 months) comes close (≈ 1,151.02 anomalistic months), so eclipses are similar in these groupings.

Series members between 1801 and 2200
August 28, 1802 (Saros 122)	August 7, 1831 (Saros 123)	July 18, 1860 (Saros 124)
June 28, 1889 (Saros 125)	June 8, 1918 (Saros 126)	May 20, 1947 (Saros 127)
April 29, 1976 (Saros 128)	April 8, 2005 (Saros 129)	March 20, 2034 (Saros 130)
February 28, 2063 (Saros 131)	February 7, 2092 (Saros 132)	January 19, 2121 (Saros 133)
December 30, 2149 (Saros 134)	December 9, 2178 (Saros 135)	
