= Azhar Khan =

Azhar Khan may refer to:

- Azhar Khan (cricketer), Pakistani cricketer
- Azhar Khan (actor), Indian-American actor
- Raja Azhar Khan, Pakistani politician
