= Arif Butt =

Pakistani cricketer (1944–2007)

Personal information
- Born: 17 May 1944; Lahore, Punjab, British India
- Died: 11 July 2007 (aged 63); Lahore, Pakistan
- Batting: Right-handed
- Bowling: Right-arm fast-medium

International information
- National side: Pakistan
- Test debut (cap 47): 4 December 1964 v Australia
- Last Test: 29 January 1965 v New Zealand

Career statistics
Competition	Test	First-class
Matches	3	97
Runs scored	59	4,017
Batting average	11.80	29.10
100s/50s	0/0	4/22
Top score	20	180
Balls bowled	666	11,879
Wickets	14	201
Bowling average	20.57	26.79
5 wickets in innings	1	10
10 wickets in match	0	2
Best bowling	6/89	8/45
Catches/stumpings	0/–	44/–
- Source: Cricinfo, 23 May 2023

Arif Butt (Urdu: عارف بٹ; 17 May 1944 – 11 July 2007) was a Pakistani Test cricketer.

Born in Lahore, Punjab, Butt made his first-class debut for Lahore against Punjab University in 1960–61 at the age of 16. He learned his cricket at the Friends Cricket Club of Lahore, coached by his uncle Khawaja Abdur Rab, and went on to play first-class cricket for Pakistan Railways from 1962-63 until his retirement after the 1977–78 season. He was a tall fast-medium bowler and useful batsman.

He made his Test debut for Pakistan at Melbourne in 1964-65, taking 6 for 89 in the first innings, becoming the first Pakistani to take 6 wickets on Test debut. He also opened the batting in the Pakistan's second innings, in place of injured wicket keeper Abdul Kadir, making 12 and defying the Australian new ball attack for almost an hour.

In the tour of New Zealand that followed, Butt played in the first two of the three Tests, taking 7 wickets at 24.28. In what turned out to be his last Test innings, in partnership with Intikhab Alam, he added 52 runs for the ninth wicket to help secure a close-fought draw.

He bowled a hostile bouncer and a genuine leg cutter and was considered unlucky to play only three Tests as "many felt he should've played many more", at a time when Pakistan often struggled to find effective fast bowlers. He toured England in 1967 but "flopped completely", taking 12 wickets at 54.50 in nine matches.

He was a handy lower-order batsman, demonstrated by a first-class career average of 29, four hundreds and over 4,000 runs.

He scored a defiant maiden century against Karachi in the 1966–67 Quaid-i-Azam Trophy final and, in 1973–74, captained Railways to victory in the Patron's Trophy and the Quaid-e-Azam trophy. He took 6 for 55 against Sindh in the Quaid final and scored 718 runs in that season, including a career best 180 as an opening bat against Punjab. His best bowling figures were 8 for 45 for Railways against Sargodha in 1972–73.

He died from heart and lung complications arising from diabetes. His funeral in Lahore was attended by a host of former cricketers and officials including Sarfraz Nawaz.

== See also ==
- List of Pakistan cricketers who have taken five-wicket hauls on Test debut
