= List of Pakistan Test cricketers =

This is a list of Pakistani Test cricketers. A Test match is an international cricket match between two of the leading cricketing nations. The list is arranged in the order in which each player won his Test cap. Where more than one player won his first Test cap in the same Test match, those players are listed alphabetically by surname.

== Players ==
Statistics are correct as of 9 September 2026.

Pakistani Test cricketers				Batting					Bowling						Fielding	
Cap	Name	Career	Mat	Inn	NO	Runs	HS	Avg	Balls	Mdn	Runs	Wkt	Best	Avg	Ca	St
1	Amir Elahi	1952	5 (Note: Amir Elahi, Abdul Hafeez Kardar and Gul Mohammad also played cricket for India. Only their records for Pakistan are given here.)	7	1	65	47	10.83	400	5	248	7	4/134	35.43	0	-
2	Anwar Hussain	1952	4	6	-	42	17	7.00	36	1	29	1	1/25	29.00	0	-
3	Fazal Mahmood	1952–1962	34	50	6	620	60	14.09	9834	560	3434	139	7/42	24.71	11	-
4	Hanif Mohammad	1952–1969	55	97	8	3915	337	43.99	206	9	95	1	1/1	95.00	40	-
5	Imtiaz Ahmed	1952–1962	41	72	1	2079	209	29.28	6	1	0	-	-	-	77	16
6	Israr Ali	1952–1959	4	8	1	33	10	4.71	318	12	165	6	2/29	27.50	1	-
7	Abdul Hafeez Kardar	1952–1958	23	37	3	847	93	24.91	2712	139	954	21	3/35	45.43	15	-
8	Khan Mohammad	1952–1958	13	17	7	100	26*	10.00	3157	153	1292	54	6/21	23.93	4	-
9	Maqsood Ahmed	1952–1955	16	27	1	507	99	19.50	462	21	191	3	2/12	63.67	13	-
10	Nazar Mohammad	1952	5	8	1	277	124*	39.57	12	1	4	-	-	-	7	-
11	Waqar Hasan	1952–1959	21	35	1	1071	189	31.50	6	-	10	-	-	-	10	-
12	Mahmood Hussain	1952–1962	27	39	6	336	35	10.18	5910	225	2628	68	6/67	38.65	5	-
13	Zulfiqar Ahmed	1952–1956	9	10	4	200	63*	33.33	1285	78	366	20	6/42	18.30	5	-
14	Wazir Mohammad	1952–1959	20	33	4	801	189	27.62	24	-	15	-	-	-	5	-
15	Alimuddin	1954–1962	25	45	2	1091	109	25.37	84	-	75	1	1/17	75.00	8	-
16	Khalid Wazir	1954	2	3	1	14	9*	7.00	-	-	-	-	-	-	0	-
17	Shujauddin	1954–1962	19	32	6	395	47	15.19	2313	121	801	20	3/18	40.05	8	-
18	Mohammed Ghazali	1954	2	4	-	32	18	8.00	48	1	18	-	-	-	0	-
19	Khalid Hasan	1954	1	2	1	17	10	17.00	126	1	116	2	2/116	58.00	0	-
20	Aslam Khokhar	1954	1	2	-	34	18	17.00	-	-	-	-	-	-	0	-
21	Miran Bakhsh	1955	2	3	2	1	1*	1.00	348	22	115	2	2/82	57.50	0	-
22	Agha Saadat Ali	1955	1	1	1	8	8*	-	-	-	-	-	-	-	3	-
23	Wallis Mathias	1955–1962	21	36	3	783	77	23.73	24	-	20	-	-	-	22	-
24	Gul Mohammad (Note: Gul Mohammad's name is sometimes recorded as Gul Mahomed.)	1956	1	2	1	39	27*	39.00	-	-	-	-	-	-	2	-
25	Haseeb Ahsan	1958–1962	12	16	7	61	14	6.78	2835	100	1330	27	6/202	49.26	1	-
26	Nasim-ul-Ghani	1958–1973	29	50	5	747	101	16.60	4406	204	1959	52	6/67	37.67	11	-
27	Saeed Ahmed	1958–1973	41	78	4	2991	172	40.42	1980	89	802	22	4/64	36.45	13	-
28	Fazal-ur-Rehman	1958	1	2	-	10	8	5.00	204	3	99	1	1/43	99.00	1	-
29	Antao D'Souza	1959–1962	6	10	8	76	23*	38.00	1587	56	745	17	5/112	43.82	3	-
30	Ijaz Butt	1959–1962	8	16	2	279	58	19.93	-	-	-	-	-	-	5	-
31	Mushtaq Mohammad	1959–1979	57	100	7	3643	201	39.17	5260	177	2309	79	5/28	29.23	42	-
32	Duncan Sharpe	1959	3	6	-	134	56	22.33	-	-	-	-	-	-	2	-
33	Mohammad Munaf	1959–1962	4	7	2	63	19	12.60	769	31	341	11	4/42	31.00	0	-
34	Intikhab Alam	1959–1977	47	77	10	1493	138	22.28	10474	383	4494	125	7/52	35.95	20	-
35	Munir Malik	1959–1962	3	4	1	7	4	2.33	684	21	358	9	5/128	39.78	1	-
36	Javed Burki	1960–1969	25	48	4	1341	140	30.48	42	2	23	-	-	-	7	-
37	Mohammad Farooq	1960–1965	7	9	4	85	47	17.00	1422	50	682	21	4/70	32.48	1	-
38	Afaq Hussain	1961–1964	2	4	4	66	35*	-	240	7	106	1	1/40	106.00	2	-
39	Javed Akhtar	1962	1	2	1	4	2*	4.00	96	5	52	-	-	-	0	-
40	Shahid Mahmood	1962	1	2	-	25	16	12.50	36	1	23	-	-	-	0	-
41	Abdul Kadir	1964–1965	4	8	-	272	95	34.00	-	-	-	-	-	-	0	1
42	Asif Iqbal	1964–1980	58	99	7	3575	175	38.86	3864	181	1502	53	5/48	28.34	36	-
43	Khalid Ibadulla	1964–1967	4	8	-	253	166	31.63	336	21	99	1	1/42	99.00	3	-
44	Majid Khan	1964–1983	63	106	5	3931	167	38.92	3584	124	1456	27	4/45	53.93	70	-
45	Pervez Sajjad	1964–1973	19	20	11	123	24	13.67	4145	217	1410	59	7/74	23.90	9	-
46	Shafqat Rana	1964–1969	5	7	-	221	95	31.57	36	1	9	1	1/2	9.00	5	-
47	Arif Butt	1964–1965	3	5	-	59	20	11.80	666	26	288	14	6/89	20.57	0	-
48	Farooq Hamid	1964	1	2	-	3	3	1.50	184	1	107	1	1/82	107.00	0	-
49	Mohammad Ilyas	1964–1969	10	19	-	441	126	23.21	84	1	63	-	-	-	6	-
50	Naushad Ali	1965	6	11	-	156	39	14.18	-	-	-	-	-	-	9	-
51	Mufasir-ul-Haq	1965	1	1	1	8	8*	-	222	12	84	3	2/50	28.00	1	-
52	Salahuddin	1965–1969	5	8	2	117	34*	19.50	546	27	187	7	2/36	26.71	3	-
53	Saleem Altaf	1967–1978	21	31	12	276	53*	14.53	4001	122	1710	46	4/11	37.17	3	-
54	Wasim Bari	1967–1984	81	112	26	1366	85	15.88	8	-	2	-	-	-	201	27
55	Niaz Ahmed	1967–1969	2	3	3	17	16*	-	294	14	94	3	2/72	31.33	1	-
56	Ghulam Abbas	1967	1	2	-	12	12	6.00	-	-	-	-	-	-	0	-
57	Aftab Gul	1969–1971	6	8	-	182	33	22.75	6	-	4	-	-	-	3	-
58	Asif Masood	1969–1977	16	19	10	93	30*	10.33	3038	78	1568	38	5/111	41.26	5	-
59	Sarfraz Nawaz	1969–1984	55	72	13	1045	90	17.71	13951	486	5798	177	9/86	32.76	26	-
60	Mohammad Nazir	1969–1983	14	18	10	144	29*	18.00	3262	162	1124	34	7/99	33.06	4	-
61	Sadiq Mohammad	1969–1981	41	74	2	2579	166	35.82	200	5	98	-	-	-	28	-
62	Younis Ahmed	1969–1987	4	7	1	177	62	29.50	6	-	6	-	-	-	0	-
63	Zaheer Abbas	1969–1985	78	124	11	5062	274	44.80	370	9	132	3	2/21	44.00	34	-
64	Aftab Baloch	1969–1975	2	3	1	97	60*	48.50	44	-	17	-	-	-	0	-
65	Imran Khan	1971–1992	88	126	25	3807	136	37.69	19458	727	8258	362	8/58	22.81	28	-
66	Talat Ali	1972–1979	10	18	2	370	61	23.13	20	1	7	-	-	-	4	-
67	Wasim Raja	1973–1985	57	92	14	2821	125	36.17	4082	134	1826	51	4/50	35.80	20	-
68	Shafiq Ahmed	1974–1981	6	10	1	99	27*	11.00	8	-	1	-	-	-	0	-
69	Agha Zahid	1975	1	2	-	15	14	7.50	-	-	-	-	-	-	0	-
70	Liaqat Ali	1975–1978	5	7	3	28	12	7.00	808	23	359	6	3/80	59.83	1	-
71	Javed Miandad	1976–1993	124	189	21	8832	280*	52.57	1470	32	682	17	3/74	40.12	93	1
72	Farrukh Zaman	1976	1	-	-	0		-	80	2	15	-	-	-	0	-
73	Shahid Israr	1976	1	1	1	7	7*	-	-	-	-	-	-	-	2	-
74	Sikander Bakht	1976–1983	26	35	12	146	22*	6.35	4870	147	2412	67	8/69	36.00	7	-
75	Iqbal Qasim	1976–1988	50	57	15	549	56	13.07	13019	649	4807	171	7/49	28.11	42	-
76	Mudassar Nazar	1976–1989	76	116	8	4114	231	38.09	5967	217	2532	66	6/32	38.36	48	-
77	Haroon Rasheed	1977–1983	23	36	1	1217	153	34.77	8	-	3	-	-	-	16	-
78	Abdul Qadir	1977–1990	67	77	11	1029	61	15.59	17126	608	7742	236	9/56	32.81	15	-
79	Mohsin Khan	1978–1986	48	79	6	2709	200	37.11	86	4	30	-	-	-	34	-
80	Anwar Khan	1979	1	2	1	15	12	15.00	32	-	12	-	-	-	0	-
81	Ehteshamuddin	1979–1982	5	3	1	2	2	1.00	940	40	375	16	5/47	23.44	2	-
82	Taslim Arif	1980	6	10	2	501	210*	62.63	30	-	28	1	1/28	28.00	6	3
83	Tauseef Ahmed	1980–1993	34	38	20	318	35*	17.67	7778	359	2950	93	6/45	31.72	9	-
84	Azhar Khan	1980	1	1	-	14	14	14.00	18	1	2	1	1/1	2.00	0	-
85	Azmat Rana	1980	1	1	-	49	49	49.00	-	-	-	-	-	-	0	-
86	Mansoor Akhtar	1980–1990	19	29	3	655	111	25.19	-	-	-	-	-	-	9	-
87	Ijaz Faqih	1980–1988	5	8	1	183	105	26.14	534	9	299	4	1/38	74.75	0	-
88	Rizwan-uz-Zaman	1981–1989	11	19	1	345	60	19.17	132	7	46	4	3/26	11.50	4	-
89	Rashid Khan	1982–1985	4	6	3	155	59	51.67	738	32	360	8	3/129	45.00	2	-
90	Saleem Malik	1982–1999	103	154	22	5768	237	43.70	734	20	414	5	1/3	82.80	65	-
91	Saleem Yousuf	1982–1990	32	44	5	1055	91*	27.05	-	-	-	-	-	-	91	13
92	Tahir Naqqash	1982–1985	15	19	5	300	57	21.43	2800	108	1398	34	5/40	41.12	3	-
93	Ashraf Ali	1982–1987	8	8	3	229	65	45.80	-	-	-	-	-	-	17	5
94	Jalal-ud-din	1982–1985	6	3	2	3	2	3.00	1197	51	537	11	3/77	48.82	0	-
95	Azeem Hafeez	1983–1985	18	21	5	134	24	8.38	4351	172	2204	63	6/46	34.98	1	-
96	Qasim Umar	1983–1986	26	43	2	1502	210	36.63	6	1	0	-	-	-	15	-
97	Shoaib Mohammad	1983–1995	45	68	7	2705	203*	44.34	396	16	170	5	2/8	34.00	22	-
98	Anil Dalpat	1984–1985	9	12	1	167	52	15.18	-	-	-	-	-	-	22	3
99	Rameez Raja	1984–1997	57	94	5	2833	122	31.83	-	-	-	-	-	-	34	-
100	Mohsin Kamal	1984–1994	9	11	7	37	13*	9.25	1348	28	822	24	4/116	34.25	4	-
101	Manzoor Elahi	1984–1995	6	10	2	123	52	15.38	444	23	194	7	2/38	27.71	7	-
102	Wasim Akram	1985–2002	104	147	19	2898	257*	22.64	22627	871	9779	414	7/119	23.62	44	-
103	Zulqarnain	1986	3	4	-	24	13	6.00	-	-	-	-	-	-	8	2
104	Zakir Khan	1986–1989	2	2	2	9	9*	-	444	13	259	5	3/80	51.80	1	-
105	Asif Mujtaba	1986–1997	25	41	3	928	65*	24.42	666	26	303	4	1/0	75.75	19	-
106	Saleem Jaffar	1986–1992	14	14	6	42	10*	5.25	2531	93	1139	36	5/40	31.64	2	-
107	Ijaz Ahmed	1987–2001	60	92	4	3315	211	37.67	180	1	77	2	1/9	38.50	45	-
108	Aamer Malik	1987–1994	14	19	3	565	117	35.31	156	5	89	1	1/0	89.00	15	1
109	Aaqib Javed	1989–1998	22	27	7	101	28*	5.05	3918	136	1874	54	5/84	34.70	2	-
110	Shahid Saeed	1989	1	1	-	12	12	12.00	90	-	43	-	-	-	0	-
111	Waqar Younis	1989–2003	87	120	21	1010	45	10.20	16224	516	8788	373	7/76	23.56	18	-
112	Nadeem Abbasi	1989	3	2	-	46	36	23.00	-	-	-	-	-	-	6	-
113	Naved Anjum	1989–1990	2	3	-	44	22	14.67	342	14	162	4	2/57	40.50	0	-
114	Akram Raza	1989–1995	9	12	2	153	32	15.30	1526	61	732	13	3/46	56.31	8	-
115	Shahid Mahboob	1989	1	-	-	0		-	294	12	131	2	2/131	65.50	0	-
116	Mushtaq Ahmed	1990–2003	52	72	16	656	59	11.71	12532	405	6100	185	7/56	32.97	23	-
117	Nadeem Ghauri	1990	1	1	-	0		0.00	48	1	20	-	-	-	0	-
118	Zahid Fazal	1990–1995	9	16	-	288	78	18.00	-	-	-	-	-	-	5	-
119	Moin Khan	1990–2004	69	104	8	2741	137	28.55	-	-	-	-	-	-	128	20
120	Saeed Anwar	1990–2001	55	91	2	4052	188*	45.53	48	3	23	-	-	-	18	-
121	Masood Anwar	1990	1	2	-	39	37	19.50	161	4	102	3	2/59	34.00	0	-
122	Aamer Sohail	1992–2000	47	83	3	2823	205	35.29	2383	80	1049	25	4/54	41.96	36	-
123	Ata-ur-Rehman	1992–1996	13	15	6	76	19	8.44	1973	62	1071	31	4/50	34.55	2	-
124	Inzamam-ul-Haq	1992–2007	119 (Note: Inzamam-ul-Haq has also played for the ICC World XI. Only his record for Pakistan is given here.)	198	22	8829	329	50.16	9	-	8	-	-	-	81	-
125	Rashid Latif	1992–2003	37	57	9	1381	150	28.77	12	-	10	-	-	-	119	11
126	Basit Ali	1993–1995	19	33	1	858	103	26.81	6	-	6	-	-	-	6	-
127	Aamer Nazir	1993–1995	6	11	6	31	11	6.20	1057	24	597	20	5/46	29.85	2	-
128	Nadeem Khan	1993–1999	2	3	1	34	25	17.00	432	10	230	2	2/147	115.00	0	-
129	Shakeel Ahmed Jr.	1993–1995	3	5	-	74	33	14.80	-	-	-	-	-	-	4	-
130	Ashfaq Ahmed	1993	1	2	1	1	1*	1.00	138	9	53	2	2/31	26.50	0	-
131	Atif Rauf	1994	1	2	-	25	16	12.50	-	-	-	-	-	-	0	-
132	Kabir Khan	1994–1995	4	5	2	24	10	8.00	655	15	370	9	3/26	41.11	1	-
133	Ijaz Ahmed Jr.	1995	2	3	-	29	16	9.67	24	-	6	-	-	-	3	-
134	Saqlain Mushtaq	1995–2004	49	78	14	927	101*	14.48	14070	541	6206	208	8/164	29.84	15	-
135	Mohammad Akram	1995–2001	9	15	6	24	10*	2.67	1477	37	859	17	5/138	50.53	4	-
136	Saleem Elahi	1995–2003	13	24	1	436	72	18.96	-	-	-	-	-	-	10	1
137	Shadab Kabir	1996–2002	5	7	-	148	55	21.14	6	-	9	-	-	-	11	-
138	Azam Khan	1996	1	1	-	14	14	14.00	-	-	-	-	-	-	0	-
139	Shahid Nazir	1996–2007	15	19	3	194	40	12.12	2234	71	1272	36	5/53	35.33	5	-
140	Hasan Raza	1996–2005	7	10	1	235	68	26.11	6	-	1	-	-	-	5	-
141	Mohammad Hussain	1996–1998	2	3	-	18	17	6.00	180	7	87	3	2/66	29.00	1	-
142	Mohammad Wasim	1996–2000	18	28	2	783	192	30.12	-	-	-	-	-	-	22	2
143	Zahoor Elahi	1996	2	3	-	30	22	10.00	-	-	-	-	-	-	1	-
144	Mohammad Zahid	1996–2003	5	6	1	7	6*	1.40	792	17	502	15	7/66	33.47	0	-
145	Ali Naqvi	1997–1998	5	9	1	242	115	30.25	12	-	11	-	-	-	1	-
146	Azhar Mahmood	1997–2001	21	34	4	900	136	30.00	3015	111	1402	39	4/50	35.95	14	-
147	Mohammad Ramzan	1997	1	2	-	36	29	18.00	-	-	-	-	-	-	1	-
148	Ali Hussain Rizvi	1997	1	-	-	0		-	111	1	72	2	2/72	36.00	0	-
149	Arshad Khan	1997–2005	9	8	2	31	9*	5.17	2538	119	960	32	5/38	30.00	0	-
150	Shoaib Akhtar	1997–2007	46	67	13	544	47	10.07	8143	237	4574	178	6/11	25.69	12	-
151	Fazl-e-Akbar	1998–2004	5	8	4	52	25	13.00	882	24	511	11	3/85	46.45	2	-
152	Mohammad Yousuf (Note: Mohammad Yousuf was known as Yousuf Youhana until 2005.)	1998–2010	89	134	12	6770	223	55.49	6	-	3	-	-	-	59	-
153	Shahid Afridi	1998–2010	26	46	1	1683	156	37.40	3092	69	1640	47	5/52	34.89	10	-
154	Shakeel Ahmed Sr.	1998	1	1	-	1	1	1.00	325	12	139	4	4/91	34.75	1	-
155	Naved Ashraf	1998–2000	2	3	-	64	32	21.33	-	-	-	-	-	-	0	-
156	Wajahatullah Wasti	1999–2000	6	10	1	329	133	36.56	18	2	8	-	-	-	7	-
157	Imran Nazir	1999–2002	8	13	-	427	131	32.85	-	-	-	-	-	-	4	-
158	Abdul Razzaq	1999–2006	46	77	9	1946	134	28.61	7008	219	3694	100	5/35	36.94	15	-
159	Younis Khan	2000–2017	118	213	19	10099	313	52.05	804	18	517	9	2/23	54.55	139	-
160	Atiq-uz-Zaman	2000	1	2	-	26	25	13.00	-	-	-	-	-	-	5	-
161	Irfan Fazil	2000	1	2	1	4	3	4.00	48	-	65	2	1/30	32.50	2	-
162	Qaiser Abbas	2000	1	1	-	2	2	2.00	96	3	35	-	-	-	0	-
163	Danish Kaneria	2000–2010	61	84	33	360	29	7.05	17697	464	9082	261	7/77	34.79	18	-
164	Faisal Iqbal	2001–2010	26	44	2	1124	139	26.76	6	-	7	-	-	-	22	-
165	Imran Farhat	2001–2013	40	77	2	2400	128	32.00	427	4	284	3	2/69	94.66	40	-
166	Misbah-ul-Haq	2001–2017	75	132	20	5222	161*	46.62	-	-	-	-	-	-	50	-
167	Mohammad Sami	2001–2012	36	56	14	487	49	11.59	7499	193	4483	85	5/36	52.74	7	-
168	Humayun Farhat	2001	1	2	-	54	28	27.00	-	-	-	-	-	-	0	-
169	Shoaib Malik	2001–2015	35	60	6	1898	245	35.14	2712	61	1519	32	4/33	47.46	18	-
170	Taufeeq Umar	2001–2014	44	83	5	2963	236	37.98	78	2	44	-	-	-	48	-
171	Naved Latif	2002	1	2	-	20	20	10.00	-	-	-	-	-	-	0	-
172	Kamran Akmal	2002–2010	53	92	6	2648	158*	30.79	-	-	-	-	-	-	184	22
173	Mohammad Hafeez	2003–2018	55	105	8	3652	224	37.64	4067	118	1808	53	4/16	34.11	45	-
174	Shabbir Ahmed	2003–2005	10	15	5	88	24*	8.80	2576	97	1175	51	5/48	23.04	3	-
175	Umar Gul	2003–2013	47	67	9	577	65*	9.94	9599	256	5553	163	6/135	34.06	11	-
176	Yasir Hameed	2003–2010	25	49	3	1491	170	32.41	78	1	72	-	-	-	20	-
177	Farhan Adil	2003	1	2	0	33	25	16.50	-	-	-	-	-	-	0	-
178	Salman Butt	2003–2010	33	62	0	1889	122	30.46	137	1	106	1	1/36	106.00	12	-
179	Yasir Ali	2003	1	2	2	1	1*	-	120	5	55	2	1/12	27.50	0	-
180	Asim Kamal	2003–2005	12	20	1	717	99	37.74	-	-	-	-	-	-	10	-
181	Naved-ul-Hasan	2004–2007	9	15	3	239	42*	19.91	1565	36	1044	18	3/30	58.00	3	-
182	Riaz Afridi	2004	1	1	0	9	9	9.00	186	10	87	2	2/42	43.50	0	-
183	Mohammad Khalil	2004–2005	2	4	1	9	5	3.00	290	3	200	-	-	-	0	-
184	Mohammad Asif	2005–2010	23	38	13	141	29	5.64	5171	91	2583	106	6/41	24.36	3	-
185	Bazid Khan	2005	1	2	0	32	23	16.00	-	-	-	-	-	-	2	-
186	Iftikhar Anjum	2006	1	1	1	9	9*	-	84	1	62	-	-	-	0	-
187	Abdur Rehman	2007–2014	22	31	3	395	60	14.10	6892	256	2910	99	6/25	29.39	8	-
188	Sohail Tanvir	2007	2	3	0	17	13	5.66	504	15	316	5	3/83	63.20	2	-
189	Yasir Arafat	2007–2009	3	3	1	94	50*	47.00	627	12	438	9	5/161	48.66	-	-
190	Khurram Manzoor	2009–2014	16	30	1	817	146	28.17	-	-	-	-	-	-	8	-
191	Sohail Khan	2009–2016	9	12	2	252	65	25.20	1828	55	1125	27	5/68	41.66	2	-
192	Mohammad Talha	2009–2014	4	5	1	34	19	8.50	740	11	504	9	3/65-	56.00	1	-
193	Abdur Rauf	2009	3	6	0	52	31	8.66	450	11	278	6	2/59	46.33	0	-
194	Mohammad Amir	2009–2019	36	67	11	751	48	13.41	7619	292	3627	119	6/44	30.47	5	-
195	Saeed Ajmal	2009–2014	35	53	12	451	50	11.00	11592	386	5003	178	7/55	28.10	11	-
196	Fawad Alam	2009–2022	19	30	4	1011	168	38.88	96	1	54	2	2/46	27.00	13	-
197	Umar Akmal	2009–2011	16	32	2	1003	129	35.82	-	-	-	-	-	-	12	0
198	Sarfaraz Ahmed	2010–2023	54	95	14	3031	118	37.41	-	-	-	-	-	-	160	22
199	Azhar Ali	2010—2022	97	180	11	7142	302*	42.26	867	8	621	8	2/35	77.62	66	0
200	Umar Amin	2010	4	8	0	99	33	12.37	132	4	63	3	1/7	21.00	1	-
201	Zulqarnain Haider	2010	1	2	0	88	88	44.00	-	-	-	-	-	-	2	-
202	Wahab Riaz	2010–2018	27	41	5	306	39	8.50	5018	118	2864	83	5/63	34.50	5	0
203	Adnan Akmal	2010–2014	21	29	5	591	64	24.62	-	-	-	-	-	-	66	11
204	Asad Shafiq	2010–2020	77	128	6	4660	137	38.19	340	1	196	3	1/7	65.33	77	0
205	Tanvir Ahmed	2010–2013	5	7	2	170	57	34.00	707	20	453	17	6–120	26.64	1	-
206	Mohammad Salman	2011	2	4	0	25	13	6.25	-	-	-	-	-	-	2	1
207	Aizaz Cheema	2011–2012	7	5	5	1	1*	-	1200	39	638	20	4/24	31.90	1	0
208	Junaid Khan	2011–2015	22	28	11	122	17	7.17	4605	157	2253	71	5/38	31.73	4	0
209	Mohammad Ayub	2012	1	2	0	47	25	23.50	-	-	-	-	-	-	1	0
210	Nasir Jamshed	2013	2	4	0	51	46	12.75	-	-	-	-	-	-	1	0
211	Rahat Ali	2013–2018	21	31	13	136	35*	7.55	4227	127	2264	58	6/127	39.03	9	0
212	Mohammad Irfan	2013	4	7	2	28	14	5.60	712	15	389	10	3/44	38.90	0	0
213	Ehsan Adil	2013–2015	3	4	0	21	12	5.25	481	19	263	5	2/54	52.60	0	0
214	Shan Masood	2013–present	44	84	1	2550	156	30.72	144	6	92	2	1/6	46.00	29	0
215	Zulfiqar Babar	2013–2016	15	18	9	144	56	16.00	4478	143	2129	54	5/74	39.42	4	0
216	Ahmed Shehzad	2013–2015	13	25	1	982	176	40.91	48	0	28	0	-	-	3	0
217	Bilawal Bhatti	2013–2014	2	3	1	70	32	35.00	438	12	291	6	3/65	48.50	0	0
218	Imran Khan	2014–2019	10	10	3	16	6	2.28	1636	50	917	29	5/58	31.62	0	0
219	Yasir Shah	2014–2022	48	72	7	918	113	14.12	14255	359	7657	244	8/41	31.38	24	0
220	Sami Aslam	2015–2017	13	25	1	758	91	31.58	-	-	-	-	-	-	7	0
221	Iftikhar Ahmed	2016–2022	4	6	1	61	27	12.20	206	1	161	1	1/1	161.00	2	0
222	Babar Azam	2016–present	61	112	9	4366	196	42.38	90	2	42	2	1/1	21.00	48	-
223	Mohammad Nawaz	2016–2022	6	10	1	144	45	16.00	959	23	496	16	5/88	31.00	4	-
224	Mohammad Rizwan	2016–present	41	69	9	2399	171*	39.98	-	-	-	-	-	-	108	10
225	Sharjeel Khan	2017	1	2	0	44	40	22.00	-	-	-	-	-	-	0	-
226	Mohammad Abbas	2017–present	27	40	19	120	29	5.71	5554	272	2318	100	6/54	23.18	8	-
227	Shadab Khan	2017–2020	6	11	2	300	56	33.33	954	19	513	14	3/31	36.64	3	-
228	Hasan Ali	2017–present	25	40	8	382	30	11.93	4355	166	2213	80	5/27	27.66	6	-
229	Haris Sohail	2017–2021	16	27	1	847	147	32.57	630	12	294	13	3/1	22.61	14	-
230	Faheem Ashraf	2018–2023	17	27	1	687	91	26.42	1908	79	991	25	3/42	39.64	5	-
231	Imam-ul-Haq	2018–present	26	50	4	1687	157	36.67	12	0	9	0	-	-	21	-
232	Usman Salahuddin	2018	1	2	0	37	33	18.50	-	-	-	-	-	-	-	-
233	Bilal Asif	2018	5	8	0	73	15	9.12	1174	40	424	16	6/36	26.50	2	-
234	Fakhar Zaman	2017–2018	3	6	0	192	94	32.00	-	-	-	-	-	-	3	-
235	Mir Hamza	2018–present	7	14	6	51	16	6.37	1183	38	632	14	4/32	45.14	2	-
236	Shaheen Afridi	2018–present	33	45	10	256	29*	7.31	6401	211	3378	121	6/51	27.91	3	-
237	Naseem Shah	2019–present	20	27	8	144	33	7.57	3411	85	2108	60	5/31	35.13	5	-
238	Muhammad Musa	2019	1	2	2	16	12*	-	120	1	114	0	-	-	0	-
239	Abid Ali	2019–present	16	26	2	1180	215*	49.16	-	-	-	-	-	-	6	-
240	Usman Shinwari	2019	1	-	-	-	-	-	90	4	54	1	1/54	54.00	0	-
241	Zafar Gohar	2021	1	2	0	71	37	35.50	192	0	159	0	-	-	0	-
242	Imran Butt	2021	6	10	0	178	91	17.80	-	-	-	-	-	-	16	-
243	Noman Ali	2021–present	21	30	5	385	97	15.40	4678	127	2378	97	8/46	24.51	2	-
244	Sajid Khan	2021–present	14	20	2	225	48*	12.50	3294	77	1880	65	8/42	28.92	7	-
245	Tabish Khan	2021	1	-	-	-	-	-	156	11	68	1	1/22	68.00	0	-
246	Abdullah Shafique	2021–present	24	46	3	1610	201	44.15	-	-	-	-	-	-	19	-
247	Salman Ali Agha	2022–present	23	44	6	1487	132*	39.13	1855	30	1161	20	3/75	58.05	32	-
248	Haris Rauf	2022	1	2	0	12	12	6.00	78	1	78	1	1/78	78.00	0	-
249	Mohammad Ali	2022–present	4	7	2	2	2	0.40	624	11	406	6	2/64	67.66	2	-
250	Saud Shakeel	2022–present	21	40	3	1773	208*	47.91	37	0	54	0	-	-	11	-
251	Zahid Mahmood	2022–2024	4	7	2	20	17	4.00	471	4	505	13	4/235	38.84	0	-
252	Abrar Ahmed	2022–present	10	15	7	68	17	8.50	2631	59	1580	46	7/114	34.34	3	-
253	Mohammad Wasim Jr.	2022	2	4	1	55	43	18.33	358	8	231	2	1/71	115.50	1	-
254	Aamer Jamal	2023–present	8	15	2	352	82	27.07	893	7	690	21	6/69	32.85	5	-
255	Khurram Shahzad	2023–present	6	11	2	83	18	9.22	906	20	600	20	6/90	30.00	3	-
256	Saim Ayub	2024–present	8	14	0	364	77	26.00	148	2	138	4	2/101	34.50	4	-
257	Kamran Ghulam	2024–present	6	11	0	312	118	28.36	18	0	16	0	-	-	2	-
258	Mohammad Huraira	2024–present	2	4	0	46	29	11.50	-	-	-	-	-	-	2	-
259	Kashif Ali	2025–present	1	2	0	1	1	0.50	60	2	39	2	1/16	19.50	0	-
260	Asif Afridi	2025–present	1	2	1	4	4	4.00	231	6	94	6	3/79	15.66	4	-
261	Abdullah Fazal	2026–present	1													
262	Azan Awais	2026–present	1													
263	Ali Usman	2026–present	1													
264	Awais Zafar	2026–present	1													
265	Ubaid Shah	2026–present	1													
266	Ghazi Ghori	2026–present	1													
267	Mohammad Imran Randhawa	2026–present	1													
268	Razaullah Mashwani	2026–present	1													

== Shirt number history ==
Since the 2019 Ashes series, there has been an introduction of names and numbers on all Test players' shirts in an effort to engage new fans and help identify the players. This forms part of the inaugural ICC World Test Championship, a league competition between the top nine Test nations spread over a two-year period, culminating in a Final between the top two teams.

S/N	Current	Past
1	Azan Awais	Salman Butt
2	-	
3	-	Umar Akmal
4	-	
5	-	Muhammad Amir Awais Zia
6	Razaullah	Shoaib Malik
7	Shadab Khan	Muhammad Sami
8	-	Muhammad Hafeez
9	-	Imad Wasim
10	Shaheen Afridi	Shahid Afridi
11	-	
12	-	Abdul Razzaq
13	Sufyan Muqeem	Mohammad Yousuf
14	Mohammad Ali	Shoaib Akhtar Sohail Khan
15	Mirza Tahir Baig Awais Zafar	Rumman Raees
16	Mohammad Rizwan	Imran Nazir
17	Hassan Nawaz	Imran Farhat Imran Khan
18		Shoaib Malik
19	Ahmad Shahzad	
20	Hussain Talat	
21	Mohammad Nawaz	
22	-	Misbah-ul-Haq
23	Arafat Minhas	Kamran Akmal
24	Usama Mir	Rana Naved-ul-hasan Mukhtar Ahmed
25	Ali Usman	Fawad Alam
26	Imam-ul-Haq	Muhammad Asif
27	Zaman Khan	Yasir Arafat
28	Shahnawaz Dahani	
29	Mohammad Haris	
30	Omair Yousuf	Bilal Asif Saad Nasim
31	Mir Hamza	Sami Aslam
32	Hasan Ali	
33	Asif Afridi	Sohail Tanvir
34		Aamer Yamin
35	Arshad Iqbal	Khalid Latif
36	Khawaja Nafay	Abdul Rehman Usman Shinwari
37	Faisal Akram	Zulqarnain Haider
38	Mohammad Abbas	
39	Fakhar Zaman	
40	Abrar Ahmed	
41	Faheem Ashraf	
42	Abdullah Fazal	Khurram Manzoor
43	Abdul Samad	Saad Ali
44	-	
45	Saad Masood	Asif Ali
46	Haider Ali	
47		Wahab Riaz
48	-	Anwar Ali
49	Khurram Shehzad	
50	-	Saeed Ajmal
51	Sahibzada Farhan	
52	Ihsanullah	
53	Haseebullah Khan Mubasir Khan	Nauman Anwar
54		Sarfaraz Ahmed
55	Abbas Afridi	Umar Gul
56	Babar Azam	
57	Abdullah Shafique	
58	Jahandad Khan	Waqas Maqsood
59	Saud Shakeel	
60	Abid Ali	
61	Nauman Ali	
62	Imran Butt	
63	Saim Ayub	
64	Danish Aziz	
65	Aamir Jamal	
66	Tayyab Tahir	
67	Agha Salman	
68	Sajid Khan	
69		Tabish Khan
70	Muhammad Musa	
71	Naseem Shah	
72	Khushdil Shah	Asad Ali
73	Ahmed Daniyal Qasim Akram	Hammad Azam
74	Mohammad Wasim	Aizaz Cheema
75	-	Younis Khan
76	Usman Tariq	Mohammad Irfan
77	Azam Khan	Nasir Jamshed
78	Usman Khan	Zulfiqar Babar
79		Azhar Ali
80	Irfan Khan Niazi	Bilawal Bhatti
81	Mohammad Taha	Asad Shafiq
82	Kamran Ghulam	
83	Ghazi Ghori	Junaid Khan
84	Ubaid Shah	Umar Amin Azan Awais
85	Zahid Mahmood	
86	Saqib Khan	Yasir Shah
87	Mohammad Hasnain	Mohammad Salman
88	Akif Javed	Zafar Gohar
89	Saad Baig Mohammad Tayyab Arif	Haris Sohail
90	Mohammad Imran Randhawa	Rahat Ali Arafat Minhas
91	Maaz Sadaqat	Ehsan Adil Usman Qadir
92	Salman Mirza	Sohaib Maqsood
93	Kashif Ali	Ahsan Ali
94	Shan Masood	Shahzaib Hasan
95	Iftikhar Ahmed	
96		Umar Akmal
97	Haris Rauf	
98	Sharjeel Khan	
99	Mohammad Huraira	Mohammad Talha
100		Raza Hasan
158		Kamran Akmal*

^not worn on kit

*Kamran only wore 158 Pakistan vs India (2012–13) tour

== See also ==
- Test cricket
- Pakistani cricket team
- List of Pakistan ODI cricketers
- List of Pakistan Twenty20 International cricketers
