= Abdul Aziz (Sindh cricketer) =

Pakistani cricketer

Personal information
- Full name: Abdul Aziz
- Born: 1941; Karachi, Sind, British India
- Died: 17 January 1959 (aged 17–18); Karachi, Sind, Pakistan
- Batting: Right-handed
- Role: Wicket-keeper
- Relatives: Abdul Kadir (brother)

Domestic team information
- Years: Team
- 1958/59: Karachi
- 1957/58: Karachi C
- FC debut: 11 October 1957 Karachi C v Sind A
- Last FC: 16 January 1959 Karachi v Pakistan Combined Services

Career statistics
Competition	First-class
Matches	8
Runs scored	149
Batting average	21.28
100s/50s	0/0
Top score	35
Catches/stumpings	17/5
- Source: CricketArchive, 21 August 2008

Abdul Aziz (Urdu: عبدالعزیز), (1941−17 January 1959) was a Pakistani cricketer who was born, and died, in Karachi, Sind. A wicket-keeper and opening batsman, Abdul Aziz played eight first-class matches for Karachi before he died after being struck by a cricket ball. He was a student at S. M. College and worked for the Pakistan State Bank.

Whilst batting in the first innings of the Quaid-e-Azam final against Pakistan Combined Services on 17 January 1959, Abdul Aziz was struck over the heart by a slow off break from Dildar Awan. While preparing to receive the next ball, Abdul Aziz fell to the ground and never regained consciousness, dying en route to the hospital. It is believed the blow aggravated an existing undiagnosed heart condition. A player who does not bat in an innings is recorded in the scorecard as "absent"; Abdul Aziz is recorded as "absent" in the second innings, with a footnote explaining he was hurt but died.

Two of Abdul Aziz's brothers also played first-class cricket: Abdul Kadir played one match for North-West Frontier Province; Abdur Rasheed played 28 matches between 1953/54 and 1964/65.

== See also ==
- List of unusual deaths in the 20th century
- Ray Chapman, an American baseball player killed after being struck by a ball during a game; he was the only player in Major League Baseball history to die of an in-game injury
- List of fatal accidents in cricket
