= West Indian cricket team in Pakistan in 2024–25 =

International cricket tour

	Pakistan	West Indies
- Dates: 17 January – 29 January 2025
Captains	Shan Masood	Kraigg Brathwaite

Test series
- Result: 2-match series drawn 1–1
Most runs	Mohammad Rizwan (147)	Gudakesh Motie (92)
Most wickets	Noman Ali (16)	Jomel Warrican (19)
- Player of the series: Jomel Warrican (WI)

The West Indies cricket team toured Pakistan in January 2025 to play two Test matches. The series formed part of the 2023–2025 ICC World Test Championship. In July 2024, the Pakistan Cricket Board (PCB) confirmed the fixtures for the tour, as a part of the 2024–25 home international season.

Initially the series was scheduled to be played on 16 January (1st Test at Karachi) and 24 January (2nd Test). In December 2024, PCB rescheduled the series with the first Test moved from Karachi to Multan.

== Squads ==
Pakistan	West Indies
Shan Masood (c); Saud Shakeel (vc); Salman Ali Agha; Abrar Ahmed; Kashif Ali; Mohammad Ali; Noman Ali; Babar Azam; Kamran Ghulam; Imam-ul-Haq; Mohammad Huraira; Sajid Khan; Rohail Nazir (wk); Mohammad Rizwan (wk); Khurram Shahzad	Kraigg Brathwaite (c); Joshua Da Silva (vc, wk); Alick Athanaze; Keacy Carty; Justin Greaves; Kavem Hodge; Tevin Imlach (wk); Amir Jangoo (wk); Mikyle Louis; Gudakesh Motie; Anderson Phillip; Kemar Roach; Jayden Seales; Kevin Sinclair; Jomel Warrican

== Tour match ==
10–12 January 2025
Scorecard

West Indies	v	Pakistan Shaheens
346/8d (90 overs); Alick Athanaze 99 (142); Mohammad Rameez 3/64 (17 overs)		212/9d (58 overs); Mohammad Huraira 74 (73); Kevin Sinclair 3/50 (14 overs)
177/5d (40 overs); Alick Athanaze 58* (84); Muhammad Musa 2/5 (5 overs)		128/2 (30 overs); Mohammad Huraira 80 (80); Jomel Warrican 2/23 (8 overs)

Match drawn
Islamabad Club Cricket Oval, Islamabad
Umpires: Faisal Afridi (Pak) and Rashid Riaz (Pak)

- West Indies won the toss and elected to bat.

== Test series ==
=== 1st Test ===
17–19 January 2025
Scorecard

Pakistan	v	West Indies
230 (68.5 overs); Saud Shakeel 84 (157); Jayden Seales 3/27 (14 overs)		137 (25.2 overs); Jomel Warrican 31* (24); Noman Ali 5/39 (11 overs)
157 (46.4 overs); Shan Masood 52 (70); Jomel Warrican 7/32 (18 overs)		123 (36.3 overs); Alick Athanaze 55 (68); Sajid Khan 5/50 (15 overs)

Pakistan won by 127 runs
Multan Cricket Stadium, Multan
Umpires: Richard Kettleborough (Eng) and Rod Tucker (Aus)
Player of the match: Sajid Khan (Pak)

- Pakistan won the toss and elected to bat.
- No play was possible before lunch on Day 1 due to bad weather.
- Mohammad Huraira (Pak) and Tevin Imlach (WI) both made their Test debuts.
- Jomel Warrican (WI) took his first five-wicket haul and ten-wicket haul in Tests.
- Sajid Khan (Pak) took his 50th wicket in Tests.
- World Test Championship points: Pakistan 12, West Indies 0.

=== 2nd Test ===
25–27 January 2025
Scorecard

West Indies	v	Pakistan
163 (41.1 overs); Gudakesh Motie 55 (87); Noman Ali 6/41 (15.1 overs)		154 (47 overs); Mohammad Rizwan 49 (75); Jomel Warrican 4/43 (17 overs)
244 (66.1 overs); Kraigg Brathwaite 52 (74); Noman Ali 4/80 (21 overs)		133 (44 overs); Babar Azam 31 (67); Jomel Warrican 5/27 (16 overs)

West Indies won by 120 runs
Multan Cricket Stadium, Multan
Umpires: Paul Reiffel (Aus) and Rod Tucker (Aus)
Player of the match: Jomel Warrican (WI)

- West Indies won the toss and elected to bat.
- Kashif Ali (Pak) and Amir Jangoo (WI) both made their Test debuts.
- Noman Ali became the first Pakistani spinner to take a hat-trick in Tests.
- This was West Indies' first Test win against Pakistan in Pakistan after 34 years.
- World Test Championship points: West Indies 12, Pakistan 0.
