= Moneeb Iqbal =

Scottish cricketer (born 1986)

Personal information
- Full name: Moneeb Mohammed Iqbal
- Born: 28 February 1986 (age 40); Glasgow, Lanarkshire, Scotland
- Batting: Right-handed
- Bowling: Leg break
- Relatives: Mohammad Ramzan (brother-in-law)

International information
- National side: Scotland
- ODI debut (cap 35): 1 April 2009 v Ireland
- Last ODI: 17 May 2013 v Pakistan
- T20I debut: 22 March 2012 v Netherlands
- Last T20I: 5 July 2013 v Kenya

Domestic team information
- Years: Team
- 2006: Durham

Career statistics
Competition	ODI	T20I	FC	LA
Matches	12	6	9	35
Runs scored	192	46	159	478
Batting average	24.00	15.33	10.60	19.12
100s/50s	0/1	0/0	0/0	0/2
Top score	63	31	42	67
Balls bowled	270	48	840	655
Wickets	4	2	19	10
Bowling average	67.50	29.50	36.73	64.55
5 wickets in innings	0	0	0	0
10 wickets in match	0	0	0	0
Best bowling	2/35	2/15	4/36	2/8
Catches/stumpings	1/–	3/–	3/–	7/–
- Source: Cricinfo, 14 September 2013

Moneeb Iqbal (born 28 February 1986) is a Scottish cricketer. He is a right-handed batsman and leg-break bowler. Having first represented Scotland in 2002, making his debut at the age of fifteen in the 2002 Under-19 World Cup, he represented the national team in the same competition in 2004 and 2006.

Though he scored a duck in his first match for the Scottish team, he finished the competition with an average nearing 20. He performed better two years later, when he hit his first half-century, and played once again in 2006. Iqbal was born in Glasgow to Pakistani parents on 28 February 1986.

At the time of his first international fixture, Moneeb was the youngest cricketer ever to represent Scotland in an international. He became a member of Durham's cricketing academy in 2004, and played his debut first-class match in May 2006, having represented the Second XI since 2004. Iqbal is a lower-order batsman for the second team, and plays in the tailend in first-class cricket.

Iqbal's brother-in-law, Mohammad Ramzan, is a onetime Pakistani Test cricketer.
