= Montgomery Cricket Club Ground =

- Location: Sahiwal, Punjab, Pakistan
- Country: Pakistan
- Coordinates: 30°38′42″N 73°6′3″E
- As of 12 January 2017; Source: CricketArchive

Montgomery Cricket Club Ground, formerly known as the Biscuit Factory Ground, was a cricket ground in Sahiwal, Punjab, Pakistan. It staged 50 first-class and 29 List A matches from 1982 to 1998.

The ground was at the Montgomery Biscuit Factory, which was the largest employer in Sahiwal. The factory's owner, Basharat Shafi (1944–2011), who had played first-class cricket for Multan in 1972 and was president of the Multan Cricket Association, developed the ground to a high standard. Apart from domestic matches, the ground also staged the only warm-up match of the Zimbabwean tour of 1996-97.

While playing a first-class match at Zafar Ali Stadium in Sahiwal on their 1987-88 tour of Pakistan, the England players were accommodated in the dormitories at the Montgomery Biscuit Factory, much to their displeasure.
