= Masood Anwar =

Pakistani cricketer (born 1967)

Personal information
- Born: 12 December 1967 (age 58); Khanewal, Punjab, Pakistan
- Batting: Left-handed
- Bowling: Slow left-arm orthodox

International information
- National side: Pakistan
- Only Test (cap 121): 6 December 1990 v West Indies

Career statistics
| Competition | Test | First-class |
|---|---|---|
| Matches | 1 | 128 |
| Runs scored | 39 | 2,308 |
| Batting average | 19.50 | 18.03 |
| 100s/50s | 0/0 | 0/5 |
| Top score | 37 | 76* |
| Balls bowled | 161 | 31,050 |
| Wickets | 3 | 587 |
| Bowling average | 34.00 | 21.71 |
| 5 wickets in innings | 0 | 38 |
| 10 wickets in match | 0 | 9 |
| Best bowling | 2/59 | 8/44 |
| Catches/stumpings | 0/– | 46/– |
- Source: ESPNcricinfo, 19 June 2017

Masood Anwar (born 10 December 1967) is a Pakistani former cricketer who played in one Test match in 1990.
