= Ghulam Abbas (cricketer) =

Pakistani cricketer (born 1947)

Personal information
- Born: 1 May 1947 (age 79); Delhi, British India
- Batting: Left-handed
- Bowling: Slow left-arm orthodox

International information
- National side: Pakistan
- Only Test (cap 56): 24 August 1967 v England

Career statistics
Competition	Test	First-class
Matches	1	102
Runs scored	12	5,271
Batting average	6.00	35.61
100s/50s	0/0	9/30
Top score	12	276
Balls bowled	–	351
Wickets	–	7
Bowling average	–	32.71
5 wickets in innings	–	0
10 wickets in match	–	0
Best bowling	–	2/9
Catches/stumpings	0/–	83/–
- Source: ESPNcricinfo, 15 June 2017

Ghulam Abbas (Urdu: غلام عبّاس; born 1 May 1947) is a former Pakistani cricketer who played in one Test match in 1967.

Born in an Urdu-speaking family, Abbas was educated at Government Boys Secondary School and Islamia College, Karachi.
