= Mohammad Ramzan (cricketer) =

Pakistani cricketer (born 1970)

Muhammad Ramzan
Personal information
- Full name: Muhammad Ramzan
- Born: 25 December 1970 (age 55); Musakhaill, Faisalabad, Pakistan
- Batting: Right-handed
- Bowling: Right-arm medium
- Relatives: Moneeb Iqbal (brother-in-law)

International information
- National side: Pakistan
- Only Test (cap 147): 6 October 1997 v South Africa

Career statistics
Competition	Test	FC	LA
Matches	1	176	114
Runs scored	36	10478	3,488
Batting average	18.00	39.09	33.21
100s/50s	0/0	25/50	5/24
Top score	29	205	152*
Balls bowled	–	722	218
Wickets	–	4	3
Bowling average	–	100.50	70.00
5 wickets in innings	–	50	0
10 wickets in match	–	0	0
Best bowling	–	1/8	2/19
Catches/stumpings	1/–	150/–	43/–
- Source: ESPNCricinfo, 11 June 2017

Muhammad Ramzan (Urdu: محمد رمضان) (born 25 December 1970) is a former Pakistani cricketer who played in one Test match in 1997.

Ramzan was a consistent player on the Pakistani domestic scene for a number of seasons most notably with United Bank Limited, Khan Research Labs and his home city Faisalabad. After many strong performances he was finally given his chance of a Test Match debut in 1997 alongside Azhar Mahmood and Ali Naqvi. He is considered by many within Pakistan cricket to have been unlucky not to have added to his single international cap.

Since moving to Scotland he has turned out as club professional for a number of clubs most notably Drumpellier, Poloc, Penicuik and Corstorphine.
