= Kassem Ibadulla =

Info on Kassem Ben Khaldi Ibadulla

Personal information
- Full name: Kassem Ben Khalid Ibadulla
- Born: 13 October 1964 (age 62); Birmingham, Warwickshire, England
- Batting: Right-handed
- Bowling: Right-arm off break
- Relatives: Billy Ibadulla (father)

Domestic team information
- Years: Team
- 1982/83–1990/91: Otago
- 1985: Cheshire
- 1987–1989: Gloucestershire

Career statistics
Competition	First-class	List A
Matches	31	19
Runs scored	1,131	184
Batting average	26.92	12.26
100s/50s	2/4	0/0
Top score	107	29
Balls bowled	2,452	318
Wickets	29	5
Bowling average	44.48	46.60
5 wickets in innings	1	0
10 wickets in match	0	0
Best bowling	5/22	3/32
Catches/stumpings	14/–	1/–
- Source: Cricinfo, 13 October 2011

Kassem Ben Khalid Ibadulla (born 13 October 1964) is a British-born former New Zealand professional cricketer. He was a right-handed batsman who bowled right-arm off break. He was born at Birmingham in England in 1964.

Ibadulla is the son of Test cricketer Billy Ibadulla and his German wife, Gertrude. He moved to New Zealand with his father in 1976. He played for Otago at Under-19 level, before making his first-class debut for the team against Central Districts in the 1982/83 Shell Trophy. Ibadulla initially played infrequently for Otago, making just five appearances between 1983 and 1986. He played in England in 1985 for Cheshire, making eight appearances in that seasons Minor Counties Championship.

In 1987 he joined English county Gloucestershire, making his first-class debut for the county against a Rest of the World XI. In that same season he also made his List A debut against Nottinghamshire in the Refuge Assurance League. He played for Gloucestershire from 1987 to 1989, making nine first-class and four List A appearances. In his nine first-class appearances for the county, he scored 269 runs at an average of 24.45, with a high score of 77. This score, which was his only first-class half century for Gloucestershire, came against Kent in the 1988 County Championship. He took 7 wickets with the ball, at a bowling average of 42.71, with best figures of 3/37.

Ibadulla continued to play for Otago during this period, toward the end of his career he became a more regular feature in the Otago side. He went on to make eighteen further first-class appearances for the team, the last of which came against Central Districts in the 1990/91 Shell Trophy. He made a total of twenty-two first-class appearances for Otago, scoring 862 runs at an average of 27.80, with a high score of 107. This score, one of two centuries he made for Otago, came against Central Districts in 1988. With the ball, he took 22 wickets at an average of 45.04, with best figures of 5/22. His only five-wicket haul came against Canterbury in his second match for Otago in the 1982/83 Shell Trophy. He made his first List A appearance for Otago in 1987 when Queensland toured New Zealand. He made fourteen further List A appearances for the team, the last of which came against Central Districts in the 1990/91 Shell Cup. He scored 155 runs in his fifteen matches, which came at an average of 11.92, with a high score of 29. With the ball, he took 5 wickets at an average of 39.40, with best figures of 3/32.
