= Sajid Khan (cricketer) =

Pakistani cricketer

Personal information
- Born: 3 September 1993 (age 33); Khyber Pakhtunkhwa, Pakistan
- Batting: Right-handed
- Bowling: Right-arm off break
- Role: Bowling-all rounder

International information
- National side: Pakistan
- Test debut (cap 244): 29 April 2021 v Zimbabwe
- Last Test: 2 August 2026 v West Indies

Domestic team information
- Years: Team
- 2016–2018: Peshawar (squad no. 68)
- 2019–2022: Khyber Pakhtunkhwa
- 2022: Somerset (squad no. 68)
- 2023/24: Peshawar (squad no. 68)
- 2023/24: Khan Research Laboratories

Career statistics
Competition	Test	FC	LA	T20
Matches	16	94	46	15
Runs scored	321	2,333	608	92
Batting average	15.28	17.54	23.38	10.22
100s/50s	0/0	1/7	0/1	0/0
Top score	48*	105	52	33*
Balls bowled	3,948	20,980	2,288	276
Wickets	77	386	46	10
Bowling average	28.81	27.16	33.71	35.10
5 wickets in innings	4	24	0	0
10 wickets in match	2	6	0	0
Best bowling	8/42	8/42	4/10	2/25
Catches/stumpings	9/–	51/–	23/–	5/–
- Source: ESPNcricinfo, 12 September 2026

Sajid Khan (born 3 September 1993) is a Pakistani cricketer who plays for Peshawar in domestic cricket. He made his international debut for the Pakistan cricket team in April 2021.

== Early life ==
Sajid's family hails from Mardan, Khyber Pakhtunkhwa. His father served in the Pakistan Army and died in 2003, when Sajid and siblings were still young, pushing his mother to work as the breadwinner to support the family. He migrated to Dubai with a six-month visa for training, where he worked at an airport to earn some money, and was a member of the Peshawar team. His part-time gigs to improve his family's financial circumstances included selling cellphones.

== Domestic career ==
Sajid Khan made his first-class debut for Peshawar in the 2016–17 Quaid-e-Azam Trophy on 22 October 2016. He made his List A debut on 20 January 2017 for Peshawar in the 2016–17 Regional One Day Cup. He made his Twenty20 debut for Peshawar in the 2018–19 National T20 Cup on 11 December 2018.

In January 2021, following the final of the 2020–21 Quaid-e-Azam Trophy, he was named as the Best Bowler of the tournament. He was the leading wicket-taker, claiming 67 wickets in 11 matches. Later the same month, he was named in Khyber Pakhtunkhwa's squad for the 2020–21 Pakistan Cup.

In September 2022, Sajid Khan signed for Somerset for the remainder of the County Championship season.

== International career ==
In January 2021, he was named in Pakistan's Test squad for their series against South Africa. In March 2021, he was again named in Pakistan's Test squad, this time for their series against Zimbabwe, and made his Test debut against Zimbabwe, on 29 April 2021.

In December 2021, in the second match against Bangladesh, Khan took his first five-wicket haul and a ten-wicket haul in Test cricket with a best bowling figure of 8 for 42 in the first innings and 12 for 128 in a match at Mirpur.

In October 2024, Khan was named in Pakistan's squad for the second and third Tests in the home series against England. In the first innings of the second Test, Khan took his second five-wicket haul with figures of 7 for 111. He was named Player of the Match for his nine-wickets in the second test. In the third Test, Khan registered a second ten-wicket haul after his third five-wicket haul with figures of 6 for 128 in the first innings and with 4 for 69 in the second innings, at Rawalpindi. He was named Player of the Series played against England.

In January 2025, during the first Test of the home series against the West Indies, Khan was declared Player of the Match for his fifer, including 4 wickets in 17 balls, and was noted for his mastery of the new ball, rare for a spinner.
