= Kashif Ali (cricketer, born 1994) =

Pakistani cricketer (born 1994)

Personal information
- Born: 6 June 1994 (age 32); Rawalpindi, Punjab, Pakistan
- Batting: Right-handed
- Bowling: Right-arm medium
- Role: Bowler

International information
- National side: Pakistan
- Only Test (cap 259): 25 January 2025 v West Indies

Domestic team information
- Years: Team
- 2018/19–: Rawalpindi
- 2021/22–2022/23: Northern
- 2023/24: Khan Research Labs
- 2024/25: Sui Northern Gas Pipelines
- 2024/25: Dolphins
- 2025: Kent

Career statistics
Competition	Test	FC	LA	T20
Matches	1	40	21	11
Runs scored	1	376	64	17
Batting average	0.50	12.12	12.80	5.66
100s/50s	0/0	0/0	0/0	0/0
Top score	1	36	22*	9*
Balls bowled	60	6,514	979	210
Wickets	2	121	32	4
Bowling average	19.50	30.79	25.93	84.25
5 wickets in innings	0	6	0	0
10 wickets in match	0	0	0	0
Best bowling	1/16	6/86	4/36	1/16
Catches/stumpings	0/–	17/–	6/–	1/–
- Source: ESPNcricinfo, 28 September 2025

Kashif Ali (born 6 June 1994) is a Pakistani international cricketer. He plays for Rawalpindi and Dolphins in domestic cricket.

He made his List A debut for Rawalpindi against Sui Southern Gas Corporation in the 2018–19 Quaid-e-Azam One Day Cup on 6 September 2018. He made his first-class debut for Northern against Balochistan cricket team in the 2021–22 Quaid-e-Azam Trophy on 17 November 2021. He made his Twenty20 debut for Rawalpindi against Abbottabad in the 2023–24 National T20 Cup on 1 December 2023.

In January 2025 Kashif was called into the Pakistan squad for the home Test series against West Indies. He made his Test debut in the second match of the series on 25 January. He took his first international wicket by dismissing Mikyle Louis in his first over.

In March 2025, he was signed by Kent County Cricket Club to play in the County Championship.
