= Ali Hussain Rizvi =

Pakistani cricketer (born 1974)

Personal information
- Born: 6 January 1974 (age 52); Karachi, Pakistan
- Batting: Right-handed
- Bowling: Legbreak

International information
- National side: Pakistan
- Only Test (cap 148): 17 October 1997 v South Africa

Career statistics
Competition	Test	First-class
Matches	1	54
Runs scored	–	477
Batting average	–	7.81
100s/50s	–	0/0
Top score	–	34
Balls bowled	111	9,602
Wickets	2	171
Bowling average	36.00	26.44
5 wickets in innings	0	11
10 wickets in match	0	2
Best bowling	2/72	6/57
Catches/stumpings	0/–	36/–
- Source: ESPNCricinfo, 11 June 2017

Ali Hussain Rizvi (Urdu: علی حسین رضوی) (born 6 January 1974) is a former Pakistani cricketer who played in one Test match in 1997. A leg spin bowler, he took two wickets in his only appearance.
