= Anwar Khan (cricketer) =

Pakistani cricketer (born 1955)

Personal information
- Born: 24 December 1955 (age 70); Karachi, Pakistan
- Batting: Right-handed
- Bowling: Right-arm fast-medium

International information
- National side: Pakistan
- Only Test (cap 80): 2 February 1979 v New Zealand

Career statistics
Competition	Test	First-class
Matches	1	102
Runs scored	15	2,255
Batting average	15.00	20.87
100s/50s	0/0	1/9
Top score	12	101*
Balls bowled	32	13,493
Wickets	0	209
Bowling average	–	29.43
5 wickets in innings	–	7
10 wickets in match	–	0
Best bowling	–	7/42
Catches/stumpings	0/–	58/–
- Source: ESPNcricinfo, 15 June 2017

Anwar Khan (Urdu: انور خان) (born 24 December 1955) is a Pakistani former cricketer who played in one Test match in 1979. He was a bowling all-rounder.

He was a match referee in the 2008 Pentangular Cup.
