= Mohammad Nazir =

Pakistani cricketer and umpire (1946–2024)

Personal information
- Born: 8 March 1946; Rawalpindi, Punjab Province, British India
- Died: 21 November 2024 (aged 78); Lahore, Punjab, Pakistan
- Batting: Right-handed
- Bowling: Right-arm offbreak

International information
- National side: Pakistan (1969–1984)
- Test debut (cap 60): 24 October 1969 v New Zealand
- Last Test: 9 December 1983 v Australia
- ODI debut (cap 30): 21 November 1980 v West Indies
- Last ODI: 10 January 1984 v Australia

Career statistics
Competition	Test	ODI	FC
Matches	14	4	180
Runs scored	144	4	4,242
Batting average	18.00	–	22.20
100s/50s	0/0	0/0	2/13
Top score	29*	2*	113*
Balls bowled	3,262	222	52,045
Wickets	34	3	829
Bowling average	33.05	52.00	19.26
5 wickets in innings	3	0	63
10 wickets in match	0	0	16
Best bowling	7/99	2/37	8/99
Catches/stumpings	4/–	0/–	86/–
- Source: ESPNcricinfo, 22 November 2024

Mohammad Nazir (Urdu: محمد نذیر; 8 March 1946 – 21 November 2024) was a Pakistani cricketer who played in 14 Test matches and four One Day Internationals (ODIs) from 1969 to 1984.

An off-spinner, Nazir took 7 wickets for 99 runs on debut in the first innings of the 1st Test between Pakistan and New Zealand in 1969, besides contributing a handy 29 not out with the bat in the first innings, and an unbeaten 17 in the second.

He became a cricket umpire after retiring as a player. He officiated in five Tests and 15 ODIs between 1994 and 2000.

Nazir died on 21 November 2024, at the age of 78.

== See also ==
- List of Test cricket umpires
- List of One Day International cricket umpires
- List of Pakistan cricketers who have taken five-wicket hauls on Test debut
