= Ausia, Bangladesh =

Coordinates: 23°42′0″N 89°16′0″E

Ausia is a town of Chittagong Division in southern Bangladesh. It is located at 23°42'0N 89°16'0E with an altitude of 19 metres (65 feet).
