= Azhar Khan (cricketer) =

Pakistani cricketer (born 1955)

Personal information
- Full name: Mohammad Azhar Khan
- Born: 7 September 1955 (age 71); Gujranwala, Punjab, Pakistan
- Batting: Right-handed
- Bowling: Right-arm off-break

International information
- National side: Pakistan
- Only Test (cap 84): 18 March 1980 v Australia

Career statistics
Competition	Tests	First-class
Matches	1	159
Runs scored	14	7733
Batting average	14.00	37.53
100s/50s	-/-	16/42
Top score	14	209*
Balls bowled	18	7528
Wickets	1	122
Bowling average	2.00	25.62
5 wickets in innings	-	4
10 wickets in match	-	-
Best bowling	1/1	6/34
Catches/stumpings	-/-	111/-
- Source: ESPNcricinfo, 15 June 2017

Mohammad Azhar Khan (born September 7, 1955, Gujranwala, Punjab) is a Pakistani former cricketer who played in one Test in 1980.

Azhar Khan played first-class cricket in Pakistan from 1972 to 1993. His highest score was 209 not out for Pakistan Universities against Bahawalpur in 1974–75. A year later, also against Bahawalpur, he made 203, this time for Lahore A.

In February 2020, he was named in Pakistan's squad for the Over-50s Cricket World Cup in South Africa. However, the tournament was cancelled during the third round due to the coronavirus pandemic.
