= Shahid Israr =

Pakistani cricketer (1950–2013)

Shahid Israr ul haque
Personal information
- Full name: Shahid Israr
- Born: 1 March 1950; Bareilly, Uttar Pradesh, India
- Died: 29 April 2013 (aged 63); Karachi, Pakistan
- Batting: Right-handed
- Role: Wicket-keeper

International information
- National side: Pakistan
- Test debut (cap 73): 30 October 1976 v New Zealand

Career statistics
Competition	Test	First-class
Matches	1	31
Runs scored	7	868
Batting average	–	28.00
100s/50s	0/0	0/3
Top score	7*	93
Catches/stumpings	2/–	66/22
- Source: ESPNcricinfo, 15 June 2017

Shahid Israr (1 March 1950 – 29 April 2013) was a Pakistani cricketer from Karachi, Sindh. The son of Israr ul Haque, he played in one Test match against New Zealand as wicket-keeper in 1976.

He played 31 first-class matches, scoring 868 runs at an average of 28. He took 66 catches and made 22 stumpings. His first-class career spanned 11 years, from 1968 to 1979.
