= S. Abdul Hamid =

British Indian sprinter

Personal information
- Full name: S. Abdul Hamid
- Nationality: (United Kingdom) British Indian (1907-1947) (Pakistan) Pakistani (1947-1985)
- Born: 1907
- Died: 22 October 1985 (aged 77–78) Lahore

Sport
- Sport: Track and field
- Event(s): 110H, 400H
- College team: Government College, Lahore

S. Abdul Hamid (1907–22 October 1985), also known as Major S. A. Hamid, was a British Indian track and field athlete. Hamid ran in the 110 metres hurdles and the 400 metres hurdles at the 1928 Summer Olympics at Amsterdam but did not progress from his heat in either race. He was also scheduled to run in the 400 metres and the 4 × 400 metres relay but did not start in either event.

== Education ==
He attended Zamindara Islamia High School, Dasuha, Faisalabad. Later, he studied at Government College, Lahore.

== All India Athletic Championships ==
Hamid, representing Punjab, won 120 yards hurdles during the Second All India Athletic Championships, held at Calcutta in 1927. The same year, he was selected to the all-India team to take part in the Far Eastern Games in Shanghai, but the three-member team could not go as by that time civil war had broken out in China.

== Indian Olympic Games ==
Hamid, representing Punjab, remained first in 220 yards, 440 yards, 120 yards hurdles, 220 yards hurdles, and third in 100 yards, during the Indian Olympic Games at Lahore in 1928. Owing to this performance, he was selected to British Indian athletic team for the 1928 Summer Olympics. In the 1930 Indian Olympic Games at Allahabad, Punjab's team retained the top position with 89 points. Hamid remained first in hop, step and jump. Hamid was among three Punjab athletes selected as member of British Indian team for the Far Eastern Games in Tokyo. Only Hamid could accompany the team, the two others dropping out for personal reasons.

He is in a photograph with other members of India's Olympic team that they signed.

== Personal bests ==
110H – 15.8 (1927); 400H – 58.5y (1932).

== As sports organizer and trainer ==
Hamid remained honorary secretary (tournaments) of the Punjab Olympic Association between 1939 and 1944 before the call of the armed forces.

After the partition of British India in 1947, Hamid who was serving in army, opted for Pakistan. He was instrumental in setting up the Pakistan Olympic Association (POA) in 1948. Hamid, who at that time was serving as Captain in Pakistan Army, was performing the duties of ADC to the Governor of Sindh, Ghulam Hussain Hidayatullah, gathered some known sport minded people and arranged a formal meeting in Karachi. Resultantly the POA was formed on 25 February 1948 and Quaid-e-Azam Muhammad Ali Jinnah, the first governor-general of the country was nominated as the patron-in-chief of the POA, whereas Ahmed Ebrahim Haroon Jaffer became its first president and Capt. S. A. Hamid its first secretary general.

He served Pakistan in the following capacities as sports organizer and trainer:

- Pakistan's chief de mission at the 1948 Summer Olympics at London.
- One of Pakistan's officials at the 1952 Summer Olympics at Helsinki.
- Pakistan's manager and coach at the Commonwealth and British Games, Vancouver; July 1954.
- Pakistan's coach at the International Military Track and Field Championships, Berlin; August 1956.
- Pakistan's associate manager at the 1958 Asian Games at Tokyo.
- Pakistan's coach at the 1962 Asian Games at Jakarta.
