= Razaullah =

Razaullah (Urdu: رضا اللہ) is a name of Arabic origin. It may refer to:

- Razaullah Khan (1937–2012), Pakistani cricketer
- Razaullah Wazir (born 1993), Pakistani cricketer
- Razaullah Mashwani (born 2005), Pakistani cricketer
- Razaullah Nizamani (died 2025), militant leader
