= Noman Ali =

Pakistani cricketer

Personal information
- Born: 7 October 1986 (age 40); Khipro, Sindh, Pakistan
- Height: 6 ft (183 cm)
- Batting: Left-handed
- Bowling: Slow left-arm orthodox
- Role: Bowler
- Relatives: Rizwan Ahmed (uncle)

International information
- National side: Pakistan (2021–present)
- Test debut (cap 243): 26 January 2021 v South Africa
- Last Test: 8 May 2026 v Bangladesh

Domestic team information
- Years: Team
- 2007: Hyderabad
- 2012–2018: Khan Research Laboratories
- 2019: Multan Sultans
- 2019–2023: Northern
- 2023/24–present: Karachi Whites
- 2026: Lancashire

Career statistics
Competition	Test	FC	LA	T20
Matches	22	140	99	52
Runs scored	391	3,320	855	207
Batting average	14.48	18.75	14.49	8.62
100s/50s	0/1	1/14	0/4	0/0
Top score	97	103*	74	26*
Balls bowled	4,906	26,939	5,148	1,160
Wickets	101	506	127	45
Bowling average	25.08	25.74	29.41	30.82
5 wickets in innings	9	37	1	0
10 wickets in match	3	10	0	0
Best bowling	8/46	8/46	5/10	3/31
Catches/stumpings	2/–	42/–	27/–	12/–
- Source: ESPNcricinfo, 27 September 2026

Noman Ali (born 7 October 1986) is a Pakistani cricket left-arm orthodox spin bowler. As of June 2026, he has taken 101 career wickets in 22 Test matches for the Pakistan national team.

== Early life and family ==
Noman Ali was born in Khipro, a small city in a subdivision of the Sanghar District, Sindh to a Punjabi family having roots in Attock District. His uncle, Rizwan Ahmed, who also played internationally for Pakistan, was crucial in the development of Noman as a cricketer.

He holds a bachelor's in commerce from Latifabad.

== Domestic career ==
He was the leading wicket-taker for Khan Research Laboratories (KRL) in the 2018–19 Quaid-e-Azam One Day Cup, with seventeen dismissals in nine matches. He was also the leading wicket-taker for KRL in the 2018–19 Quaid-e-Azam Trophy, with 43 dismissals in eight matches. In March 2019, he was named in Sindh's squad for the 2019 Pakistan Cup.

In September 2019, he was named in Northern's squad for the 2019–20 Quaid-e-Azam Trophy tournament. He was the leading wicket-taker in the tournament, with 54 dismissals in ten matches. In January 2021, he was named in Northern's squad for the 2020–21 Pakistan Cup.

== International career ==
In January 2021, he was named in Pakistan's Test squad for their series against South Africa. He made his Test debut for Pakistan, against South Africa, on 26 January 2021. This made him the fourth oldest Test debutant for Pakistan. He took his first wicket in international cricket, that of South Africa captain Quinton de Kock, on 26 January 2021. In the second innings, he took 5 for 35, to become the 12th bowler for Pakistan to take a five-wicket haul on debut in Test cricket.

In March 2021, he was picked for his first overseas series, against Zimbabwe. In the second Test, Noman scored 97 runs in a 169-run partnership with Abid Ali.

In October 2024, Noman was named in Pakistan's squad for the second and third tests in the series against England. In the second Test, Noman finished with career-best test match figures of 8 for 46 in the second innings and 11 for 147 in the match.

On 25th January 2025, Noman Ali became the first Pakistani spinner to take a men's Test hattrick against the West Indies in the second Test on their tour of Pakistan. However, Pakistan failed to capitalise on his brilliance in the first innings as West Indies number 9 Gudakesh Motie scored his maiden Test match half-century, along with Kemar Roach and Jomel Warrican as the trio combined to score 109 runs off the last 2 wickets.

In October 2025, during the first Test of the home series against South Africa, Noman Ali claimed his third career ten-wicket haul in Tests and setting Pakistan firmly on course for victory. By lunch on the final day, South Africa were four wickets down with 139 runs still required. Noman's performance earned him the Player of the Match award.

In May 2026 on the tour to Bangladesh, Ali took his 100th wicket in Test Cricket, and also became the oldest player to do so, breaking a record that stood for 130 years.
