= List of Pakistan cricketers who have taken five-wicket hauls on Test debut =

List of cricketers

In cricket, a five-wicket haul (also known as a "five-for" or "fifer") refers to a bowler taking five or more wickets in a single innings. This is regarded as a significant achievement. As of As November 2026, 181 cricketers have taken a five-wicket haul on their debut in a Test match, with 15 of them being taken by Pakistani players. They have taken a five-wicket haul on debut against seven different opponents: four times against Australia, three times against New Zealand and South Africa each, twice against England, and once against Bangladesh, India and Zimbabwe each. Of the 15 occasions, Pakistan won the match five times, and drew seven times. The players have taken five-wicket hauls at 11 different venues, including seven outside Pakistan; four of them have achieved the feat at the National Stadium, Karachi.

Arif Butt was the first Pakistani player to take a five-wicket haul on his Test debut, he took six wickets for 89 runs against Australia in 1964. Mohammad Nazir, Mohammad Zahid, Abrar Ahmed and Saqib Khan are the only bowlers to have taken seven wickets each. Five bowlers have taken six wickets each and seven others have taken five wickets on debut. Zahid took seven wickets for 66 runs, the best bowling figures by a Pakistani bowler on debut, against New Zealand in 1996, at the Rawalpindi Cricket Stadium. He accumulated 11 wickets for 130 runs in the match, the first Pakistani to take 10 or more wickets in a Test match on debut. Amongst the bowlers, Noman Ali is the most economical, with 1.37 runs per over, and Zahid has the best strike rate. (Note: In cricket, strike rate is referred to the average number of deliveries bowled before a bowler takes a wicket.) As of 2026, the most recent bowler to achieve the feat is Saqib Khan. He took seven wickets for 130 runs against Sri Lanka in 2026 at the Rawalpindi Cricket Stadium.

Abrar Ahmed became the first Pakistani bowler to take a five-wicket haul in the opening session of a test match and also on debut.

== Key ==
Symbol	Meaning
Date	Date the match was held, or starting date of the match for Test matches
Inn	The innings of the match in which the five-wicket haul was taken
Overs	Number of overs bowled in that innings
Runs	Runs conceded
Wkts	Number of wickets taken
Econ	Bowling economy rate (average runs per over)
Batsmen	The batsmen whose wickets were taken in the five-wicket haul
Result	The result for the Pakistan team in that match
†	Bowler selected as "Man of the match"
‡	10 wickets or more taken in the match
Drawn	The match was drawn

== Five-wicket hauls ==
Five-wicket hauls on Test debut by Pakistani bowlers
No.	Bowler	Date	Ground	Against	Inn	Overs	Runs	Wkts	Econ	Batsmen	Result
1	Arif Butt	4 December 1964	Melbourne Cricket Ground, Melbourne	Australia	2	21.3	89	6	3.12	Bob Simpson; Bill Lawry; Brian Booth; Tom Veivers; David Sincock; Garth McKenzie	Drawn
2	Mohammad Nazir	24 October 1969	National Stadium, Karachi	New Zealand	2	30.1	99	7	3.28	Graham Dowling; Bruce Murray; Brian Hastings; Mark Burgess; Vic Pollard; Bob Cunis; Hedley Howarth	Drawn
3	Shahid Nazir	17 October 1996	Sheikhupura Stadium, Sheikhupura	Zimbabwe	1	22.4	53	5	2.33	ADR Campbell; Andy Flower; Craig Wishart; Andy Whittall; Henry Olonga	Drawn
4	Mohammad Zahid†‡	28 November 1996	Rawalpindi Cricket Stadium, Rawalpindi	New Zealand	4	20.0	66	7	3.30	Bryan Young; Justin Vaughan; Adam Parore; Lee Germon; Nathan Astle; Chris Harris; Dipak Patel	Won
5	Shahid Afridi	22 October 1998	National Stadium, Karachi	Australia	1	23.3	52	5	2.21	Mark Waugh; Steve Waugh; Darren Lehmann; Gavin Robertson; Glenn McGrath	Drawn
6	Mohammad Sami†	8 March 2001	Eden Park, Auckland	New Zealand	4	15.0	36	5	2.40	Paul Wiseman; Mathew Sinclair; Craig McMillan; James Franklin; Daryl Tuffey	Won
7	Shabbir Ahmed	20 August 2003	National Stadium, Karachi	Bangladesh	3	18.1	48	5	2.64	Sanwar Hossain; Rajin Saleh; Khaled Mahmud; Tapash Baisya; Mohammad Rafique	Won
8	Yasir Arafat	8 December 2007	M Chinnaswamy Stadium, Bangalore	India	1	39.0	161	5	4.12	Wasim Jaffer; Rahul Dravid; V. V. S. Laxman; Dinesh Karthik; Harbhajan Singh	Drawn
9	Wahab Riaz	18 August 2010	The Oval, London	England	1	18.0	63	5	3.50	Andrew Strauss; Jonathan Trott; Kevin Pietersen; Eoin Morgan; Stuart Broad	Won
10	Tanvir Ahmed	20 November 2010	Sheikh Zayed Cricket Stadium, Abu Dhabi (neutral venue)	South Africa	1	28.0	120	6	4.28	Graeme Smith; Alviro Petersen; Hashim Amla; Jacques Kallis; Mark Boucher; Paul Harris	Drawn
11	Bilal Asif	7 October 2018	Dubai International Cricket Stadium, Dubai (neutral venue)	Australia	1	21.3	36	6	1.67	Shaun Marsh; Usman Khawaja; Travis Head; Marnus Labuschagne; Tim Paine; Nathan Lyon	Drawn
12	Noman Ali	26 January 2021	National Stadium, Karachi	South Africa	2	25.3	35	5	1.37	Aiden Markram; George Linde; Kagiso Rabada; Anrich Nortje; Temba Bavuma	Won
13	Abrar Ahmed	9 December 2022	Multan Cricket Stadium, Multan	England	1	22	114	7	5.18	Zak Crawley; Ben Duckett; Joe Root; Ollie Pope; Harry Brook; Ben Stokes; Will Jacks	Lost
14	Aamer Jamal	14 December 2023	Perth Stadium, Perth	Australia	1	20.2	111	6	5.45	Travis Head; David Warner; Alex Carey; Mitchell Starc; Pat Cummins; Nathan Lyon	Lost
15	Asif Afridi	20 October 2025	Rawalpindi Cricket Stadium, Rawalpindi	South Africa	2	34.3	79	6	2.28	Tony de Zorzi; Dewald Brevis; Kyle Verreynne; Tristan Stubbs; Simon Harmer; Kagiso Rabada	Lost
16	Saqib Khan	9 November 2026	Rawalpindi Cricket Stadium, Rawalpindi	Sri Lanka	2	34	130	7	3.82	Dinesh Chandimal; Lahiru Udara; Dhananjaya de Silva; Kusal Mendis; Sonal Dinusha; Lahiru Kumara; Asitha Fernando	Drawn

== See also ==
- List of cricketers who have taken five-wicket hauls on Test debut
