= Shahid Nazir =

Pakistani cricketer (born 1977)

Personal information
- Full name: Shahid Nazir
- Born: 4 December 1977 (age 48); Faisalabad, Punjab, Pakistan
- Batting: Right-handed
- Bowling: Right-arm fast-medium

International information
- National side: Pakistan (1996-2007)
- Test debut (cap 139): 17 October 1996 v Zimbabwe
- Last Test: 26 January 2007 v South Africa
- ODI debut (cap 107): 1 September 1996 v England
- Last ODI: 19 February 2000 v Sri Lanka

Career statistics
Competition	Test	ODI
Matches	13	17
Runs scored	109	25
Batting average	9.08	25.00
100s/50s	0/0	0/0
Top score	40	8
Balls bowled	1994	810
Wickets	34	19
Bowling average	31.88	34.15
5 wickets in innings	1	0
10 wickets in match	0	0
Best bowling	5/53	3/14
Catches/stumpings	5/–	4/–
- Source: ESPNcricinfo, 14 January 2007

Shahid Nazir (Urdu: شاہد نذیر) (born 4 December 1977) is a Pakistani former cricketer.

He made his Test debut for Pakistan against Zimbabwe at Sheikhupura in 1996, and immediately received much criticism from the spectators whose local favourite Aaqib Javed he was thought to have replaced. However, the crowd soon got behind him as he took 5 wickets in the first innings. He played in a number of Test matches for Pakistan over the next 3 years, but appearances became more intermittent and he was dropped in 1999.

Shahid Nazir made a return to the national team on 8 June 2006 when he was officially added to the Pakistani squad for their tour of England after an injury to Shoaib Akhtar.

In 2008, he signed with the Indian Cricket League and played for the Lahore Badshahs. Shahid Nazir has not played international cricket since January 2007.

== See also ==
- List of Pakistan cricketers who have taken five-wicket hauls on Test debut
