= Azam Khan (cricketer, born 1969) =

Pakistani cricketer (born 1969)

Personal information
- Full name: Mohammad Azam Khan
- Born: 1 March 1969 (age 57); Karachi, Pakistan
- Batting: Right-handed

International information
- National side: Pakistan
- Only Test (cap 138): 17 October 1996 v Zimbabwe
- ODI debut (cap 112): 1 November 1996 v Zimbabwe
- Last ODI: 6 November 1998 v Australia

Career statistics
Competition	Test	ODI	FC
Matches	1	6	120
Runs scored	14	116	6,875
Batting average	14.00	23.19	36.37
100s/50s	0/0	0/1	11/40
Top score	14	72	215*
Balls bowled	–	–	26
Wickets	–	–	1
Bowling average	–	–	21.00
5 wickets in innings	–	–	0
10 wickets in match	–	–	0
Best bowling	–	–	1/0
Catches/stumpings	0/–	2/–	84/–
- Source: ESPNCricinfo, 4 February 2017

Mohammad Azam Khan (born 1 March 1969) is a Pakistani former cricketer who played in one Test match and six One Day Internationals for the Pakistan national team from 1996 to 1998.
