= Pakistani cricket team in Australia in 1964–65 =

International cricket tour

The Pakistan national cricket team toured Australia in the 1964–65 season and played 4 first-class matches, including the inaugural Test match between Australia and Pakistan in Australia. The two countries had already played each other in Pakistan.

During this tour, Arif Butt became the first Pakistani player to take a five-wicket haul on his Test debut, taking six wickets for 89 runs.

== Test match summary ==
4, 5, 7, 8 December 1964
(4-day match)
Scorecard

Pakistan	v	Australia
287 (87.6 overs); Hanif Mohammad 104; GD McKenzie 3/66 (22 overs)		448 (92.3 overs); TR Veivers 88; Arif Butt 6/89 (21.3 overs)
326 (96.4 overs); Hanif Mohammad 93; NJN Hawke 4/72 (21 overs)		88/2 (11.5 overs); BK Shepherd 43*; Arif Butt 1/29 (5.5 overs)

Match drawn
Melbourne Cricket Ground, Melbourne
Umpires: CJ Egar and WJ Smyth

- Australia won the toss and elected to field.
- 6 December was taken as a rest day.
- Mohammed Ilyas, Arif Butt and Farooq Hameed (all PAK), and IM Chappell and DJ Sincock (both AUS) made their Test debuts.

== Annual reviews ==
- Playfair Cricket Annual 1965
- Wisden Cricketers' Almanack 1965
