= Aamer Nazir =

Pakistani cricketer (born 1971)

Personal information
- Full name: Aamer Nazir
- Born: January 2, 1971 (age 55); Lahore, Punjab, Pakistan
- Batting: Right-handed
- Bowling: Right-arm fast-medium

International information
- National side: Pakistan (1993–1995)
- Test debut (cap 127): 23 April 1993 v West Indies
- Last Test: 22 September 1995 v Sri Lanka
- ODI debut (cap 90): 26 March 1993 v West Indies
- Last ODI: 11 April 1995 v Sri Lanka

Career statistics
| Competition | Test | ODI |
|---|---|---|
| Matches | 6 | 9 |
| Runs scored | 31 | 13 |
| Batting average | 6.20 | 13.00 |
| 100s/50s | 0/0 | 0/0 |
| Top score | 11 | 9* |
| Balls bowled | 1,057 | 417 |
| Wickets | 20 | 11 |
| Bowling average | 29.85 | 31.45 |
| 5 wickets in innings | 1 | 0 |
| 10 wickets in match | 0 | 0 |
| Best bowling | 5/46 | 3/43 |
| Catches/stumpings | 2/– | 0/– |
- Source: ESPNcricinfo, 4 February 2017

Aamer Nazir (born 2 January 1971) is a former Pakistani cricketer who played in six Test matches and nine One Day Internationals from 1993 to 1995.

== Career ==
Nazir received his training from Panthers and Tigers Gymkhana. In his early career, he played Grade 2 cricket matches in various tournaments.

At the age of 22, he was included in Pakistan national cricket team. He made his international debut in March 1993 against West Indies in an ODI match. During the match, he almost achieved the rare feat of a hat-trick on debut but was denied by a poor umpiring decision as described by Geoffrey Boycott. Later in April 1993, when Pakistan played a Test against South Africa in Johannesburg in 1995, injuries to pace bowlers resulted in a call-up for Nazir. Nazir was still on a 14-hour flight when he was named in the team, his plane landed an hour before play and he took the field 35 minutes late. When he bowled, he broke down with cramps.
