= Ausia, Pakistan =

Ausia اوسیاہ
- Semi-Urban
- Ausia
- Location within Pakistan
- Coordinates: 33°59′43″N 73°28′28″E
- Country: Pakistan
- Province: Punjab
- Elevation: 1,712 m (5,617 ft)

Population (2017)
  - Total: 6,346−6,700
- Time zone: UTC+5 (PST)
- Calling code: 05132

Ausia (اوسیاہ ) is a village in the Union council of Dewal, Murree Tehsil (مری), Murree District, Pakistan. It borders the Union Councils of Rawat, Phagwari and Malkot. It is located on the Upper Kohala Road, at an altitude of 1712 metres.

A main road links Ausia with Malkot, and further to Ayubia and Abbottabad. Another link road, Ausia-Dehla Road, connects the Upper Kohala Road with the Lower Kohala Road, and starts at Parao, the main bazaar of Ausia. During the British Raj, the Parao served as a resting place for the troops, including high command, en-route to Kashmir and India.

The Ausia Bazar (Parao, Makkah Chowk, Malkot Chowk and Chatti) offers a variety of hotel, workshop, and catering services. Adjacent to the bazar are a number of private and government educational institutions and two playgrounds, which host sporting events for the locals and others.

== Notable people ==
- Nadeem Abbasi, Former Test Cricketer Pakistan National Team (1989)
- Javed Malik, Prime Minister's Special Envoy for Foreign Investment
