= Nadeem Abbasi =

Pakistani cricketer (born 1968)

Personal information
- Full name: Nadeem Ahmed Abbasi
- Born: 10 November 1968 (age 58); Murree, Rawalpindi, Punjab, Pakistan
- Batting: Right-handed
- Role: Wicket-keeper

International information
- National side: Pakistan
- Test debut (cap 112): 23 November 1989 v India
- Last Test: 9 December 1989 v India

Career statistics
Competition	Test	FC	LA
Matches	3	131	88
Runs scored	46	5,157	1,638
Batting average	23.00	29.63	23.40
100s/50s	0/0	6/23	0/6
Top score	36	120*	91*
Balls bowled	–	131	71
Wickets	–	6	1
Bowling average	–	45.83	65.00
5 wickets in innings	–	0	0
10 wickets in match	–	0	0
Best bowling	–	2/27	1/18
Catches/stumpings	6/–	294/31	79/36
- Source: espncricinfo.com, 22 January 2021

Nadeem Abbasi (born 10 November 1968) is a former Pakistani cricketer who played in three Test matches in 1989.

He also captained Khan Research Laboratories and Rawalpindi in domestic first-class cricket. During this tenure, he led KRL to a runners-up spot in the National One Day Cup in 2000. After retirement, he became a very successful Rawalpindi coach and regional selector, as well as working in the Pakistan National Cricket Academy and Abbottabad Region, grooming players, who later played for Pakistan.
