= Abdul Kadir (cricketer) =

Abdul Kadir Jamali
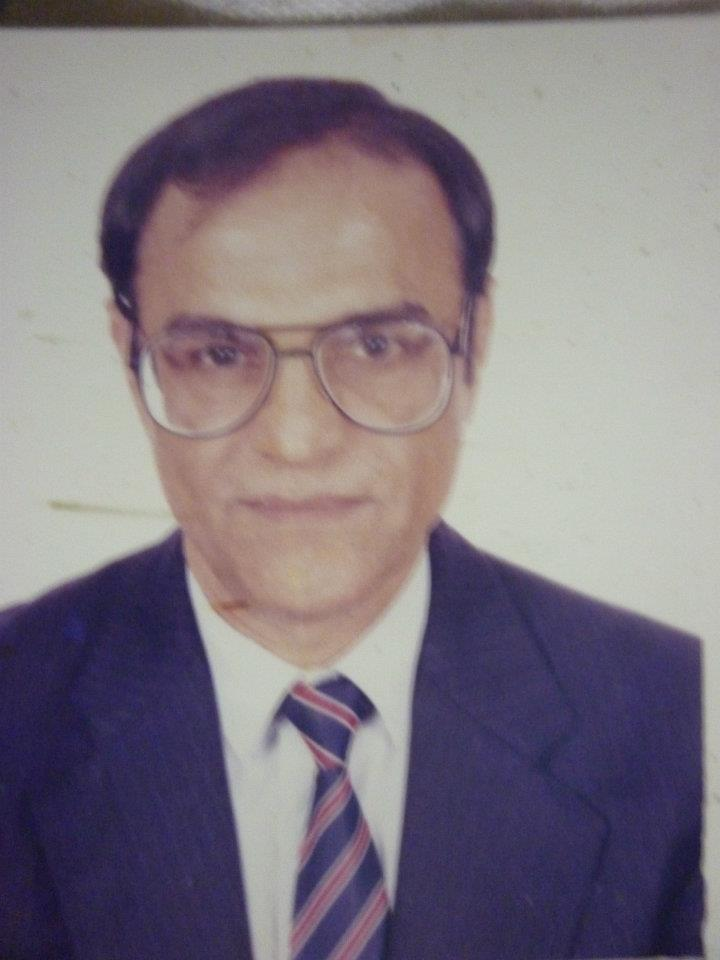

Personal information
- Born: 10 May 1944; Karachi, British India
- Died: 12 March 2002 (aged 57); Karachi, Pakistan
- Batting: Left-handed
- Relatives: Abdul Aziz (brother)

International information
- National side: Pakistan
- Test debut (cap 41): 24 October 1964 v Australia
- Last Test: 29 January 1965 v New Zealand

Career statistics
Competition	Test	First-class
Matches	4	36
Runs scored	272	1,523
Batting average	34.00	28.73
100s/50s	0/2	1/9
Top score	95	114*
Catches/stumpings	0/1	46/13
- Source: ESPNcricinfo, 15 August 2022

Abdul Kadir Jamali (Urdu: عبدالقادر; 10 May 1944 – 12 March 2002, Karachi) was a Pakistani cricketer who played in four Tests from 1964 to 1965. A wicket-keeper, Abdul Kadir was run out for 95 on his Test debut, against Australia at Karachi. He had opened the batting with Khalid Ibadulla with whom he made an opening partnership of 249, the only 200+ stand by two debutants for any wicket in the history of test cricket. He was also the first Sindhi speaking cricketer in the Pakistan national team. He was the first Pakistani cricketer to be dismissed in the 90s on Test debut. His only other Test half century was an innings of 58 at Auckland.

Abdul Kadir got his early education from Sindh Madrasatul Islam. He was the son of a famous religious scholar Mufti Azam of Pakistan Moulana Sahibdad Khan Jamali. Two of his brothers also played first-class cricket, Abdul Aziz and Abdul Rasheed. Later, Abdul Kadir served as vice president in National Bank of Pakistan. He died on 12 March 2002.

== Records ==
- Abdul Kadir (95) on debut went on to be part of unbroken record (as of March 2013). The partnership of 249 between Ibadulla and Abdul Kadir (95) for Pakistan against Australia in Karachi in 1964–65 is the highest in Test cricket for any wicket to involve two test debutants.
