= Sri Lankan cricket team in Pakistan in 2019–20 =

International cricket tour

	Pakistan	Sri Lanka
- Dates: 27 September – 23 December 2019
Captains	Azhar Ali (Tests); Sarfaraz Ahmed (ODIs and T20Is)	Dimuth Karunaratne (Tests); Lahiru Thirimanne (ODIs); Dasun Shanaka (T20Is)

Test series
- Result: Pakistan won the 2-match series 1–0
Most runs	Abid Ali (321)	Oshada Fernando (146)
Most wickets	Shaheen Afridi (8)	Lahiru Kumara (7)
- Player of the series: Abid Ali (Pak)

One Day International series
- Results: Pakistan won the 3-match series 2–0
Most runs	Babar Azam (146)	Danushka Gunathilaka (147)
Most wickets	Usman Shinwari (6)	Wanindu Hasaranga (3)
- Player of the series: Babar Azam (Pak)

Twenty20 International series
- Results: Sri Lanka won the 3-match series 3–0
Most runs	Sarfaraz Ahmed (67)	Bhanuka Rajapaksa (112)
Most wickets	Mohammad Hasnain (3); Mohammad Amir (3)	Wanindu Hasaranga (8)
- Player of the series: Wanindu Hasaranga (SL)

The Sri Lankan cricket team toured Pakistan in September and October 2019 to play three One Day Internationals (ODIs) and three Twenty20 International (T20I) matches against the Pakistan cricket team. The tour originally comprised two Test matches, but these were moved to December 2019. Sri Lanka last played a match in Pakistan in October 2017, when the third T20I took place at the Gaddafi Stadium in Lahore. Pakistan won the ODI series 2–0, after the first match was washed out, and Sri Lanka won the T20I series 3–0.

Several players in Sri Lanka's squad opted not to travel for the series, with Lahiru Thirimanne and Dasun Shanaka named as ODI and T20I captains respectively. Despite Pakistan failing to reach the semi-finals of the 2019 Cricket World Cup in England, Sarfaraz Ahmed was retained as the captain of the team for the tour, with Babar Azam named as vice-captain. Sarfaraz later said that leading the Pakistan team at home "will be one of the highlights of my career".

Following the limited overs matches, Sri Lanka returned to Pakistan in December 2019 to play two Test matches. The Test series formed part of the inaugural 2019–2021 ICC World Test Championship. It was the first time in ten years that Test cricket was played in Pakistan.

The first Test match ended in a draw, with significant amounts of play lost to rain and bad light. Pakistan's Abid Ali scored 109 not out to become the first male cricketer to score a century on both the Test and the ODI debut. Following the first Test, Sri Lanka's captain Dimuth Karunaratne expressed his regret in not playing in the limited-overs matches, and said that "Pakistan is now safe for cricket". Pakistan won the second Test match by 263 runs, to give them a 1–0 series win, and their first Test victory in Pakistan in ten years. Following the win, Pakistan's Test captain Azhar Ali said the occasion "carried great importance and was very significant because we were playing our first home Test series".

== Background ==
In March 2009, the Sri Lankan cricket team was attacked by gunmen ahead of the second Test match at the Gaddafi Stadium in Lahore, and had not played a full series in Pakistan since. In May 2019, at the Asian Cricket Council (ACC) meeting in Singapore, the Pakistan Cricket Board (PCB) made a request to Sri Lanka Cricket (SLC) to play two Test matches in Pakistan. In July 2019, the SLC sent a security expert to assess the situation in Pakistan, with Sri Lanka Cricket saying they were "likely" to play a Test match in the country. A further decision was taken by Sri Lanka after a security delegation inspects venues in Lahore and Karachi in early August 2019. The delegation gave Sri Lanka Cricket "very positive feedback", suggesting that Sri Lanka could be open to playing a Test match in Pakistan. On 22 August 2019, Sri Lanka's Sports Minister confirmed their agreement to play a three-match ODI series in Pakistan in October, but ruled out playing any Test matches.

On 9 September 2019, Sri Lanka Cricket met with players who were selected in a preliminary squad for the tour, to confirm with each individual if they would travel or not to Pakistan. Dinesh Chandimal, Akila Dananjaya, Niroshan Dickwella, Dimuth Karunaratne, Suranga Lakmal, Lasith Malinga, Angelo Mathews, Kusal Perera, Thisara Perera and Dhananjaya de Silva all confirmed that they would not be going to Pakistan for the tour. Two days later, on the day that Sri Lanka named the squads to tour Pakistan, Sri Lanka's government received information on a possible terrorist threat on the team. Sri Lanka Cricket conducted a reassessment prior to the tour starting. The PCB ruled out moving the fixtures to a neutral venue. Ehsan Mani, chairman of the PCB, stated that "we don't have the time to shift or lookout for any other option right now", reiterating that the PCB's default position of playing the matches in Pakistan. On 19 September 2019, Sri Lanka Cricket confirmed that the tour would go ahead as planned. Two days later, the PCB appointed all the match officials for the tour.

In October 2019, the PCB proposed hosting the two Test matches in Pakistan, instead of the UAE, at venues in Rawalpindi and Karachi. Sri Lanka Cricket said that they were "very positive" with regards to the progress of playing Test cricket in Pakistan. In November 2019, the PCB confirmed the dates and venues for the Test series. As a result of the Test series being agreed, the PCB moved the dates of the final of the 2019–20 Quaid-e-Azam Trophy to accommodate the international fixtures. In November 2019, Sri Lanka named a full-strength squad for the Test matches, with only one change from their previous Test series, which was against New Zealand in August 2019. Early the following month, the International Cricket Council (ICC) appointed the match officials for the Test series. Pakistan confirmed their Test squad four days ahead of the first match. Fawad Alam was recalled to Pakistan's squad, after last playing a Test for the team in November and December 2009, against New Zealand. The Sri Lankan Test squad arrived in Pakistan on 9 December 2019. No cricketer from either team had previously played Test cricket in Pakistan.

== Summary ==
=== Limited-overs matches ===
The first ODI match at the National Stadium in Karachi was abandoned due to rain. It was the first time that an ODI match at the venue had been washed out. As a result, the Pakistan Cricket Board (PCB) rescheduled the second ODI match, moving it back one day to 30 September 2019, to allow the groundstaff more time to prepare the outfield. Pakistan won both of the remaining matches to win the ODI series 2–0.

In the T20I series, Sri Lanka won the first match by 64 runs, their first win against Pakistan since December 2013. Sri Lanka also won the second T20I, by a margin of 35 runs, to take an unassailable lead in the series. It was Sri Lanka's first ever series win against Pakistan in a T20I bilateral series. Sri Lanka went on to win the final T20I match by 13 runs, winning the series 3–0. It was the first time in a three-match T20I series that Sri Lanka had won 3–0, and the first time that Pakistan had been whitewashed.

Afterwards, Pakistan's head coach and chief selector Misbah-ul-Haq and team captain Sarfaraz Ahmed admitted that losing a series 3–0 to a second-string side had left them with "lots of questions to answer". Meanwhile, Sri Lanka's coach, Rumesh Ratnayake, praised the hospitality and security that the team had received in Pakistan, saying that it is "a message for the whole world", with the hopes other teams would tour Pakistan again.

=== Test matches ===
In the first Test match, Sri Lanka won the toss and elected to bat. However, most of the match was affected by the weather, with rain and bad light impacting on the Test. Only 18.2 overs were bowled on day two, 5.2 overs on day three, and no play at all was possible on day four. Early on the fifth and final day, Sri Lanka declared their first innings, after Dhananjaya de Silva had scored his century. Pakistan's Abid Ali and Babar Azam both scored unbeaten hundreds, before the teams shook hands, with the match finishing as a draw. Abid Ali became the first male cricketer to score a century on his Test and ODI debuts.

Pakistan won the toss and elected to bat in the second Test. However, they were bowled out for 191 runs inside of 60 overs. Sri Lanka then lost three wickets, ending the first day on 64/3. Sri Lanka were dismissed for 271 runs on day two, with a lead of 80 runs over the hosts. In reply, Shan Masood and Abid Ali made an opening stand of 278 runs, the second-highest partnership for the first wicket for Pakistan in a Test match. Shan Masood, Abid Ali, Azhar Ali and Babar Azam all made centuries, with Pakistan becoming only the second team in Test cricket history to have their top four batsmen to score hundreds. Pakistan eventually declared their innings on 555/3 at lunch on day four. Sri Lanka reached the end of day four with 212 runs, but for the loss of seven wickets. Pakistan only needed 16 balls on the morning of day five to dismiss Sri Lanka, with Naseem Shah taking his first five-wicket haul in Test cricket. Pakistan won the match by 263 runs, taking the two-match series 1–0. Abid Ali was named the player of the match and the player of the series.

It was Pakistan's first series win in Pakistan since beating the West Indies 2–0 in November 2006. It was also Pakistan's first series win in Pakistan against Sri Lanka since their 1–0 win in January 1992.

== Squads ==
Tests		ODIs		T20Is	
Pakistan	Sri Lanka	Pakistan	Sri Lanka	Pakistan	Sri Lanka
Azhar Ali (c); Mohammad Abbas; Shaheen Afridi; Fawad Alam; Abid Ali; Babar Azam; Kashif Bhatti; Imran Khan; Shan Masood; Mohammad Rizwan (wk); Asad Shafiq; Naseem Shah; Yasir Shah; Usman Shinwari; Haris Sohail; Imam-ul-Haq	Dimuth Karunaratne (c); Dinesh Chandimal; Niroshan Dickwella; Lasith Embuldeniya; Asitha Fernando; Oshada Fernando; Vishwa Fernando; Lahiru Kumara; ~~Suranga Lakmal~~; Angelo Mathews; Kusal Mendis; Dilruwan Perera; Kusal Perera (wk); Kasun Rajitha; Lakshan Sandakan; Dhananjaya de Silva; Lahiru Thirimanne	Sarfaraz Ahmed (c, wk); Babar Azam (vc); Iftikhar Ahmed; Abid Ali; Asif Ali; Mohammad Amir; Mohammad Hasnain; Shadab Khan; Mohammad Nawaz; Wahab Riaz; Mohammad Rizwan; Usman Shinwari; Haris Sohail; Imam-ul-Haq; Imad Wasim; Fakhar Zaman	Lahiru Thirimanne (c); Minod Bhanuka; Avishka Fernando; Oshada Fernando; Danushka Gunathilaka; Wanindu Hasaranga; Shehan Jayasuriya; Lahiru Kumara; Angelo Perera; Nuwan Pradeep; Kasun Rajitha; Sadeera Samarawickrama (wk); Lakshan Sandakan; Dasun Shanaka; Isuru Udana	Sarfaraz Ahmed (c, wk); Babar Azam (vc); Iftikhar Ahmed; Asif Ali; Umar Akmal; Mohammad Amir; Faheem Ashraf; Mohammad Hasnain; Shadab Khan; Mohammad Nawaz; Wahab Riaz; Ahmed Shehzad; Usman Shinwari; Haris Sohail; Imam-ul-Haq; Imad Wasim; Fakhar Zaman	Dasun Shanaka (c); Minod Bhanuka; Avishka Fernando; Oshada Fernando; Danushka Gunathilaka; Wanindu Hasaranga; Shehan Jayasuriya; Lahiru Kumara; Lahiru Madushanka; Angelo Perera; Nuwan Pradeep; Bhanuka Rajapaksa; Kasun Rajitha; Sadeera Samarawickrama (wk); Lakshan Sandakan; Isuru Udana

Ahead of the Test series, Suranga Lakmal was ruled out of Sri Lanka's squad with dengue fever, with Asitha Fernando named as his replacement.

== ODI series ==
=== 1st ODI ===
27 September 2019
15:00 (D/N)
Scorecard

Pakistan	v	Sri Lanka

Match abandoned
National Stadium, Karachi
Umpires: Ahsan Raza (Pak) and Joel Wilson (WI)

- No toss.
- No play was possible due to rain.

=== 2nd ODI ===
30 September 2019
15:00 (D/N)
Scorecard

Pakistan; 305/7 (50 overs)	v	Sri Lanka; 238 (46.5 overs)
Babar Azam 115 (105); Wanindu Hasaranga 2/63 (10 overs)		Shehan Jayasuriya 96 (109); Usman Shinwari 5/51 (10 overs)

Pakistan won by 67 runs
National Stadium, Karachi
Umpires: Michael Gough (Eng) and Shozab Raza (Pak)
Player of the match: Usman Shinwari (Pak)

- Pakistan won the toss and elected to bat.

=== 3rd ODI ===
2 October 2019
15:00 (D/N)
Scorecard

Sri Lanka; 297/9 (50 overs)	v	Pakistan; 299/5 (48.2 overs)
Danushka Gunathilaka 133 (135); Mohammad Amir 3/50 (10 overs)		Fakhar Zaman 76 (91); Nuwan Pradeep 2/53 (9.2 overs)

Pakistan won by 5 wickets
National Stadium, Karachi
Umpires: Aleem Dar (Pak) and Joel Wilson (WI)
Player of the match: Abid Ali (Pak)

- Sri Lanka won the toss and elected to bat.
- Minod Bhanuka (SL) made his ODI debut.

== T20I series ==
=== 1st T20I ===
5 October 2019
18:30 (N)
Scorecard

Sri Lanka; 165/5 (20 overs)	v	Pakistan; 101 (17.4 overs)
Danushka Gunathilaka 57 (38); Mohammad Hasnain 3/37 (4 overs)		Iftikhar Ahmed 25 (24); Isuru Udana 3/11 (2.4 overs)

Sri Lanka won by 64 runs
Gaddafi Stadium, Lahore
Umpires: Aleem Dar (Pak) and Ahsan Raza (Pak)
Player of the match: Danushka Gunathilaka (SL)

- Pakistan won the toss and elected to field.
- Minod Bhanuka and Bhanuka Rajapaksa (SL) both made their T20I debuts.
- Dasun Shanaka captained Sri Lanka for the first time in T20Is.
- Mohammad Hasnain became the youngest bowler, the second for Pakistan, and ninth overall, to take a hat-trick in T20Is (19 years 183 days).

=== 2nd T20I ===
7 October 2019
18:30 (N)
Scorecard

Sri Lanka; 182/6 (20 overs)	v	Pakistan; 147 (19 overs)
Bhanuka Rajapaksa 77 (48); Imad Wasim 1/27 (4 overs)		Imad Wasim 47 (29); Nuwan Pradeep 4/25 (4 overs)

Sri Lanka won by 35 runs
Gaddafi Stadium, Lahore
Umpires: Aleem Dar (Pak) and Asif Yaqoob (Pak)
Player of the match: Bhanuka Rajapaksa (SL)

- Sri Lanka won the toss and elected to bat.

=== 3rd T20I ===
9 October 2019
18:30 (N)
Scorecard

Sri Lanka; 147/7 (20 overs)	v	Pakistan; 134/6 (20 overs)
Oshada Fernando 78* (48); Mohammad Amir 3/27 (4 overs)		Haris Sohail 52 (50); Wanindu Hasaranga 3/21 (4 overs)

Sri Lanka won by 13 runs
Gaddafi Stadium, Lahore
Umpires: Aleem Dar (Pak) and Shozab Raza (Pak)
Player of the match: Wanindu Hasaranga (SL)

- Sri Lanka won the toss and elected to bat.
- Oshada Fernando (SL) made his T20I debut.

== Test series ==
=== 1st Test ===
11–15 December 2019
Scorecard

Sri Lanka	v	Pakistan
308/6d (97 overs); Dhananjaya de Silva 102* (166); Shaheen Afridi 2/58 (22 overs)		252/2 (70 overs); Abid Ali 109* (201); Kasun Rajitha 1/5 (6 overs)

Match drawn
Rawalpindi Cricket Stadium, Rawalpindi
Umpires: Michael Gough (Eng) and Richard Kettleborough (Eng)
Player of the match: Abid Ali (Pak)

- Sri Lanka won the toss and elected to bat.
- Only 18.2 overs and 5.2 overs of play was possible on days 2 and 3 respectively due to rain and bad light.
- No play was possible on day 4 due to a wet outfield.
- Abid Ali and Usman Shinwari (Pak) both made their Test debuts.
- Abid Ali (Pak) scored his first century in Tests, and became the first male cricketer to score a century on debut in ODIs and Tests.
- World Test Championship points: Pakistan 20, Sri Lanka 20.

=== 2nd Test ===
19–23 December 2019
Scorecard

Pakistan	v	Sri Lanka
191 (59.3 overs); Asad Shafiq 63 (126); Lahiru Kumara 4/49 (18 overs)		271 (85.5 overs); Dinesh Chandimal 74 (143); Shaheen Afridi 5/77 (26.5 overs)
555/3d (131 overs); Abid Ali 174 (281); Lahiru Kumara 2/139 (29 overs)		212 (62.5 overs); Oshada Fernando 102 (180); Naseem Shah 5/31 (12.5 overs)

Pakistan won by 263 runs
National Stadium, Karachi
Umpires: Bruce Oxenford (Aus) and Joel Wilson (WI)
Player of the match: Abid Ali (Pak)

- Pakistan won the toss and elected to bat.
- Shaheen Afridi (Pak) took his first five-wicket haul in Tests.
- Abid Ali became the first batsman for Pakistan to score hundreds in each of his first two Tests.
- Shan Masood (Pak) scored his 1,000th run in Tests.
- This was the first time that the top four batsmen for Pakistan all scored centuries in the same innings in Tests.
- Oshada Fernando (SL) scored his first century in Tests.
- Naseem Shah (Pak) took his first five-wicket haul in Tests, and at the age of 16 years and 307 days, he became the youngest fast bowler to take a five-wicket haul in Tests.
- World Test Championship points: Pakistan 60, Sri Lanka 0.
