= 2017–18 Regional One Day Cup =

Cricket tournament

- Dates: 24 January – 11 February 2018
- Administrator(s): Pakistan Cricket Board
- Cricket format: List A cricket
- Tournament format(s): Round-robin and Final
- Champions: Karachi Whites
- Participants: 8
- Most runs: Shan Masood (656)
- Most wickets: Mohammad Imran (14); Zia-ul-Haq (14); Taj Wali (14)
- Official website: PCB

The 2017–18 Regional One Day Cup was a List A cricket tournament that took place in Pakistan. The competition ran from 24 January to 11 February 2018. Peshawar were the defending champions.

In round seven of the tournament, Abid Ali, batting for Islamabad, scored 209 not out against Peshawar. This was the highest List A score by a Pakistan batsman and he became the fourth batsman from Pakistan to score 200 runs or more in a List A match.

Following the group stage, Karachi Whites and Peshawar advanced to the first semi-final, with Rawalpindi and Islamabad progressing to the second semi-final. In the first semi-final, Karachi Whites beat Peshawar, the defending champions, by five wickets to move to the final. In the second semi-final, Islamabad beat Rawalpindi by 13 runs to progress to the final. Karachi Whites won the tournament, beating Islamabad by five wickets in the final.

== Teams ==
The following teams are competing:

- Faisalabad
- Federally Administered Tribal Areas
- Islamabad
- Karachi Whites
- Lahore Blues
- Lahore Whites
- Peshawar
- Rawalpindi

== Points table ==
Team	Pld	W	L	T	Pts	NRR
Karachi Whites	7	5	2	0	10	+0.677
Rawalpindi	7	5	2	0	10	+0.539
Peshawar	7	5	2	0	10	–0.440
Islamabad	7	3	4	0	6	+0.578
Lahore Blues	7	3	4	0	6	+0.292
Faisalabad	7	3	4	0	6	–0.331
Lahore Whites	7	2	4	1	5	–0.638
Federally Administered Tribal Areas	7	1	5	1	3	–0.663

Teams qualified for the finals

== Fixtures ==
=== Round 1 ===
25 January 2018
Scorecard

Islamabad; 196/9 (50 overs)	v	Rawalpindi; 197/6 (40.1 overs)
Faizan Riaz 53 (87); Sohail Tanvir 4/43 (10 overs)		Iftikhar Ahmed 61* (53); Raza Hasan 2/36 (9 overs)

Rawalpindi won by 4 wickets
Rawalpindi Cricket Stadium, Rawalpindi
Umpires: Mohammad Sajid and Riazuddin

- Rawalpindi won the toss and elected to field.

25 January 2018
Scorecard

Faisalabad; 77 (36 overs)	v	Karachi Whites; 79/5 (25 overs)
Waqas Maqsood 13 (17); Anwar Ali 3/9 (9 overs)		Akbar-ur-Rehman 24* (66); Waqas Maqsood 3/14 (8 overs)

Karachi Whites won by 5 wickets
Khan Research Laboratory Ground, Rawalpindi
Umpires: Ghaffar Kazmi and Tariq Rasheed

- Karachi Whites won the toss and elected to field.

25 January 2018
Scorecard

Lahore Blues; 272/7 (43 overs)	v	Lahore Whites; 273/8 (43 overs)
Mohammad Saad 96 (89); Umaid Asif 3/47 (8 overs)		Usman Salahuddin 94* (85); Raza Ali Dar 2/26 (9 overs)

Lahore Whites won by 2 wickets
National Ground, Islamabad
Umpires: Imtiaz Iqbal and Shameem Ansari

- Lahore Whites won the toss and elected to field.

25 January 2018
Scorecard

Federally Administered Tribal Areas; 219 (46.4 overs)	v	Peshawar; 223/3 (45.1 overs)
Khushdil Shah 61 (73); Akbar Badshah 2/23 (5 overs)		Sahibzada Farhan 88 (107); Sohail Akhtar 2/38 (8 overs)

Peshawar won by 7 wickets
Diamond Club Ground, Islamabad
Umpires: Aaley Haider and Qaiser Waheed

- Peshawar won the toss and elected to field.

=== Round 2 ===
27 January 2018
Scorecard

Islamabad; 247/8 (50 overs)	v	Faisalabad; 248/0 (45.5 overs)
Faizan Riaz 68 (52); Mohammad Imran 4/41 (10 overs)		Abdul Samad 130* (143)

Faisalabad won by 10 wickets
Diamond Club Ground, Islamabad
Umpires: Rashid Riaz and Tariq Rasheed

- Faisalabad won the toss and elected to field.
- Raees Ahmed (Faisalabad) made his List A debut.

27 January 2018
Scorecard

Rawalpindi; 300/7 (50 overs)	v	Karachi Whites; 301/3 (48.5 overs)
Naved Malik 83 (102); Rahat Ali 4/55 (9 overs)		Asad Shafiq 140 (110); Kashif Bhatti 1/34 (10 overs)

Karachi Whites won by 7 wickets
Khan Research Laboratory Ground, Rawalpindi
Umpires: Nasir Hussain and Waleed Yaqub

- Karachi Whites won the toss and elected to field.

27 January 2018
Scorecard

Lahore Blues; 324/7 (50 overs)	v	Peshawar; 243/9 (50 overs)
Sami Aslam 120 (126); Azizullah 2/61 (9 overs)		Zohaib Khan 71* (92); Agha Salman 3/48 (10 overs)

Lahore Blues won by 81 runs
Rawalpindi Cricket Stadium, Rawalpindi
Umpires: Imtiaz Iqbal and Tahir Rasheed

- Peshawar won the toss and elected to field.
- Ali Mustafa (Lahore Blues) made his List A debut.

27 January 2018
Scorecard

Federally Administered Tribal Areas; 236 (47.1 overs)	v	Lahore Whites; 236/9 (50 overs)
Sohail Akhtar 44 (32); Mohammad Irfan 4/35 (9 overs)		Mohammad Irfan 63 (60); Khushdil Shah 4/39 (10 overs)

Match tied
National Ground, Islamabad
Umpires: Aaley Haider and Shameem Ansari

- Lahore Whites won the toss and elected to field.

=== Round 3 ===
29 January 2018
Scorecard

Federally Administered Tribal Areas; 311/9 (50 overs)	v	Faisalabad; 316/3 (43.2 overs)
Khushdil Shah 93 (80); Mohammad Imran 4/38 (10 overs)		Asif Ali 133 (94); Hammad Azam 2/45 (7 overs)

Faisalabad won by 7 wickets
Rawalpindi Cricket Stadium, Rawalpindi
Umpires: Ghaffar Kazmi and Zameer Haider

- Faisalabad won the toss and elected to field.

29 January 2018
Scorecard

Karachi Whites; 206/8 (50 overs)	v	Peshawar; 212/3 (34.5 overs)
Fawad Alam 90* (128); Israrullah 3/40 (9 overs)		Sahibzada Farhan 85 (88); Danish Aziz 2/23 (5 overs)

Peshawar won by 7 wickets
National Ground, Islamabad
Umpires: Ahmed Shahab and Qaiser Waheed

- Peshawar won the toss and elected to field.

29 January 2018
Scorecard

Lahore Blues; 181/9 (50 overs)	v	Rawalpindi; 183/6 (45.3 overs)
Bilawal Iqbal 50* (50); Kashif Bhatti 3/34 (10 overs)		Azhar Ali 68 (112); Agha Salman 2/28 (10 overs)

Rawalpindi won by 4 wickets
Khan Research Laboratory Ground, Rawalpindi
Umpires: Farooq Ali Khan and Tahir Rasheed

- Rawalpindi won the toss and elected to field.

29 January 2018
Scorecard

Islamabad; 282/8 (50 overs)	v	Lahore Whites; 231 (45 overs)
Faizan Riaz 95 (111); Umaid Asif 3/54 (9 overs)		Usman Salahuddin 81 (90); Nauman Ali 4/41 (10 overs)

Islamabad won by 51 runs
Diamond Club Ground, Islamabad
Umpires: Imtiaz Iqbal and Mohammad Sajid

- Lahore Whites won the toss and elected to field.

=== Round 4 ===
31 January 2018
Scorecard

Faisalabad; 248 (50 overs)	v	Peshawar; 252/6 (49.1 overs)
Abdul Samad 62 (84); Imran Khan 3/38 (10 overs)		Sahibzada Farhan 72 (107); Asad Raza 2/61 (9.1 overs)

Peshawar won by 4 wickets
Arbab Niaz Stadium, Peshawar
Umpires: Ghaffar Kazmi and Mohammad Asif

- Peshawar won the toss and elected to field.

31 January 2018
Scorecard

Federally Administered Tribal Areas; 120 (34 overs)	v	Karachi Whites; 124/0 (31.1 overs)
Sohail Akhtar 24 (39); Zia-ul-Haq 3/17 (8 overs)		Khurram Manzoor 61* (96)

Karachi Whites won by 10 wickets
National Ground, Islamabad
Umpires: Abdul Muqeet and Zameer Haider

- Karachi Whites won the toss and elected to field.

31 January 2018
Scorecard

Islamabad; 254/5 (50 overs)	v	Lahore Blues; 255/3 (48.5 overs)
Shan Masood 128* (137); Aizaz Cheema 2/58 (10 overs)		Mohammad Saad 100* (121); Nauman Ali 1/43 (10 overs)

Lahore Blues won by 7 wickets
Diamond Club Ground, Islamabad
Umpires: Farooq Ali Khan and Mohammad Sajid

- Lahore Blues won the toss and elected to field.

31 January 2018
Scorecard

Lahore Whites; 190 (48.1 overs)	v	Rawalpindi; 191/2 (35.1 overs)
Mohammad Mohsin 37 (33); Yasir Ali 3/22 (8.1 overs)		Umar Amin 84* (100); Mohammad Aftab 1/14 (6 overs)

Rawalpindi won by 8 wickets
Rawalpindi Cricket Stadium, Rawalpindi
Umpires: Majid Hussain and Saqib Khan

- Rawalpindi won the toss and elected to field.

=== Round 5 ===
2 February 2018
Scorecard

Federally Administered Tribal Areas; 224 (44.1 overs)	v	Islamabad; 228/1 (35.5 overs)
Khushdil Shah 54 (53); Raza Hasan 4/27 (9 overs)		Abid Ali 96* (113); Mohammad Irfan 1/51 (7 overs)

Islamabad won by 9 wickets
Diamond Club Ground, Islamabad
Umpires: Mohammad Asif and Waleed Yaqub

- Islamabad won the toss and elected to field.
- Sajid Rehman (Islamabad) and Nisar Afridi (Federally Administered Tribal Areas) both made their List A debuts.

2 February 2018
Scorecard

Lahore Blues; 288/8 (50 overs)	v	Karachi Whites; 211 (43.3 overs)
Umar Akmal 64 (45); Danish Aziz 3/54 (8 overs)		Akbar-ur-Rehman 97 (104); Qaiser Ashraf 4/34 (8.3 overs)

Lahore Blues won by 77 runs
Khan Research Laboratory Ground, Rawalpindi
Umpires: Saqib Khan and Sultan Mahmood

- Karachi Whites won the toss and elected to field.

2 February 2018
Scorecard

Lahore Whites; 249 (48 overs)	v	Faisalabad; 246/9 (50 overs)
Umar Siddiq 77 (90); Mohammad Imran 2/24 (9 overs)		Raees Ahmed 75 (80); Ali Shafiq 3/50 (10 overs)

Lahore Whites won by 3 runs
Rawalpindi Cricket Stadium, Rawalpindi
Umpires: Asif Yaqoob and Mohammad Sajid

- Faisalabad won the toss and elected to field.

2 February 2018
Scorecard

Rawalpindi; 302/7 (50 overs)	v	Peshawar; 305/2 (47.3 overs)
Azhar Ali 104 (111); Taj Wali 4/43 (9 overs)		Israrullah 150 (125); Ataullah 1/62 (10 overs)

Peshawar won by 8 wickets
Arbab Niaz Stadium, Peshawar
Umpires: Abdul Muqeet and Rashid Riaz

- Peshawar won the toss and elected to field.
- Umar Islam (Peshawar) made his List A debut.

=== Round 6 ===
4 February 2018
Scorecard

Faisalabad; 228/9 (50 overs)	v	Rawalpindi; 229/4 (42.4 overs)
Raees Ahmed 65 (72); Yasir Ali 4/69 (10 overs)		Mohammad Hafeez 64 (66); Asad Raza 2/47 (8 overs)

Rawalpindi won by 6 wickets
Diamond Club Ground, Islamabad
Umpires: Ahmed Shahab and Tahir Shah

- Rawalpindi won the toss and elected to field.

4 February 2018
Scorecard

Karachi Whites; 384/5 (50 overs)	v	Islamabad; 298/7 (50 overs)
Khurram Manzoor 187 (155); Shehzad Azam 3/85 (8 overs)		Nauman Ali 74 (45); Mohammad Sami 2/42 (7 overs)

Karachi Whites won by 86 runs
Rawalpindi Cricket Stadium, Rawalpindi
Umpires: Rashid Riaz and Waleed Yaqub

- Islamabad won the toss and elected to field.

4 February 2018
Scorecard

Federally Administered Tribal Areas; 266/9 (50 overs)	v	Lahore Blues; 231 (48.4 overs)
Sohail Akhtar 52 (43); Bilawal Iqbal 4/34 (9 overs)		Mohammad Saad 67 (99); Mir Hamza 3/55 (9 overs)

Federally Administered Tribal Areas won by 35 runs
Khan Research Laboratory Ground, Rawalpindi
Umpires: Khalid Mahmood and Waseemuddin

- Lahore Blues won the toss and elected to field.
- Samiullah and Mohammad Sarwar (Federally Administered Tribal Areas) both made their List A debuts.

4 February 2018
Scorecard

Lahore Whites; 281/9 (50 overs)	v	Peshawar; 285/3 (46.2 overs)
Ahmed Shehzad 104 (96); Taj Wali 3/64 (10 overs)		Sahibzada Farhan 119 (119); Ali Shafiq 2/40 (8 overs)

Peshawar won by 7 wickets
Arbab Niaz Stadium, Peshawar
Umpires: Saqib Khan and Sultan Mahmood

- Peshawar won the toss and elected to field.

=== Round 7 ===
6 February 2018
Scorecard

Islamabad; 374/1 (50 overs)	v	Peshawar; 141 (38 overs)
Abid Ali 209* (156); Imran Khan 1/72 (10 overs)		Nabi Gul 42 (51); Shahid Yousuf 3/8 (3 overs)

Islamabad won by 233 runs
Arbab Niaz Stadium, Peshawar
Umpires: Majid Hussain and Rashid Riaz

- Peshawar won the toss and elected to field.

6 February 2018
Scorecard

Lahore Blues; 235 (48.4 overs)	v	Faisalabad; 239/7 (49.5 overs)
Mohammad Saad 89 (122); Faheem Ashraf 3/29 (8 overs)		Khurram Shehzad 77 (102); Qaiser Ashraf 3/43 (10 overs)

Faisalabad won by 3 wickets
Diamond Club Ground, Islamabad
Umpires: Khalid Mahmood and Waseemuddin

- Faisalabad won the toss and elected to field.

6 February 2018
Scorecard

Lahore Whites; 239/8 (50 overs)	v	Karachi Whites; 241/1 (39 overs)
Usman Salahuddin 92 (121); Mohammad Asghar 3/39 (10 overs)		Khurram Manzoor 143* (126); Asfand Mehran 1/45 (10 overs)

Karachi Whites won by 9 wickets
Rawalpindi Cricket Stadium, Rawalpindi
Umpires: Faisal Afridi and Mohammad Sajid

- Karachi Whites won the toss and elected to field.

6 February 2018
Scorecard

Federally Administered Tribal Areas; 320/8 (50 overs)	v	Rawalpindi; 324/5 (49.5 overs)
Khushdil Shah 96 (85); Saud Shakeel 2/48 (10 overs)		Saud Shakeel 134* (122); Sohail Akhtar 2/27 (6 overs)

Rawalpindi won by 5 wickets
Khan Research Laboratory Ground, Rawalpindi
Umpires: Ahsan Raza and Zameer Haider

- Rawalpindi won the toss and elected to field.

== Finals ==
1st Semi-final
8 February 2018
Scorecard

Peshawar; 281 (49.5 overs)	v	Karachi Whites; 285/5 (49.1 overs)
Mohammad Rizwan 72 (65); Mohammad Asghar 3/43 (10 overs)		Khurram Manzoor 100 (102); Israrullah 1/36 (4.1 overs)

Karachi Whites won by 5 wickets
Rawalpindi Cricket Stadium, Rawalpindi
Umpires: Asif Yaqoob and Rashid Riaz

- Peshawar won the toss and elected to bat.

2nd Semi-final
9 February 2018
Scorecard

Islamabad; 380/2 (50 overs)	v	Rawalpindi; 367/9 (50 overs)
Shan Masood 182* (153); Saad Altaf 1/62 (8 overs)		Iftikhar Ahmed 123 (110); Hamza Nadeem 3/85 (10 overs)

Islamabad won by 13 runs
Rawalpindi Cricket Stadium, Rawalpindi
Umpires: Ahsan Raza and Khalid Mahmood

- Rawalpindi won the toss and elected to field.

Final
11 February 2018
Scorecard

Islamabad; 347/4 (50 overs)	v	Karachi Whites; 349/5 (49.3 overs)
Babar Azam 105 (95); Asad Shafiq 1/29 (6 overs)		Fawad Alam 149 (130); Raza Hasan 1/49 (10 overs)

Karachi Whites won by 5 wickets
Rawalpindi Cricket Stadium, Rawalpindi
Umpires: Ahsan Raza and Rashid Riaz
Player of the match: Fawad Alam (Karachi Whites)

- Islamabad won the toss and elected to bat.
