= Pakistani cricket team in New Zealand in 2015–16 =

International cricket tour

| | New Zealand | Pakistan |
- Dates: 15 January 2016 – 31 January 2016
| Captains | Kane Williamson(T20Is and 1st & 2nd ODIs); Brendon McCullum (3rd ODI) | Azhar Ali (ODIs); Shahid Afridi (T20Is) |

One Day International series
- Results: New Zealand won the 3-match series 2–0
| Most runs | Kane Williamson (94) | Babar Azam (145) |
| Most wickets | Trent Boult (6) | Mohammad Amir (5) |

Twenty20 International series
- Results: New Zealand won the 3-match series 2–1
| Most runs | Kane Williamson (175) | Umar Akmal (85) |
| Most wickets | Adam Milne (8) | Wahab Riaz (5) |

The Pakistani cricket team toured New Zealand in January 2016 to play three One Day Internationals (ODIs) and three Twenty20 International (T20Is) matches. New Zealand won the T20I series 2–1 and the ODI series 2–0.

== Squads ==
| ODIs | | T20Is | |
| New Zealand | Pakistan | New Zealand | Pakistan |
|---|---|---|---|
| Kane Williamson (c); Corey Anderson; Trent Boult; Doug Bracewell; Grant Elliott; Martin Guptill; Matt Henry; Tom Latham; ~~Mitchell McClenaghan~~; Brendon McCullum; Adam Milne; Colin Munro; Henry Nicholls; Luke Ronchi (wk); Mitchell Santner; BJ Watling (wk) | Azhar Ali (c); Sarfaraz Ahmed (wk); Anwar Ali; Rahat Ali; Mohammad Amir; Babar Azam; Zafar Gohar; Mohammad Hafeez; Mohammad Irfan; Shoaib Malik; Sohaib Maqsood; Wahab Riaz; Mohammad Rizwan (wk); Asad Shafiq; Ahmed Shehzad; Imad Wasim | Kane Williamson (c); Corey Anderson; Todd Astle; Trent Boult; Grant Elliott; Martin Guptill; Matt Henry; Tom Latham; Mitchell McClenaghan; Adam Milne; Colin Munro; Luke Ronchi (wk); Mitchell Santner; Ross Taylor | Shahid Afridi (c); Iftikhar Ahmed; Sarfaraz Ahmed (wk); Umar Akmal; Anwar Ali; Mohammad Amir; Umar Gul; Mohammad Hafeez; Shoaib Malik; Sohaib Maqsood; Saad Nasim; Wahab Riaz; Mohammad Rizwan (wk); Ahmed Shehzad; Imad Wasim; Aamer Yamin |

BJ Watling joined New Zealand's squad for the 2nd and 3rd ODIs. Brendon McCullum joined the squad for the 3rd ODI. New Zealand's Mitchell McClenaghan suffered an eye injury during the first ODI and was ruled out of the rest of the series. He was replaced by Doug Bracewell.

== T20I series ==
=== 1st T20I ===
15 January
19:00 (D/N)
Scorecard

| Pakistan; 171/8 (20 overs) | v | New Zealand; 155 (20 overs) |
| Mohammad Hafeez 61 (47); Adam Milne 4/37 (4 overs) | | Kane Williamson 70 (60); Wahab Riaz 3/34 (4 overs) |

Pakistan won by 16 runs
Eden Park, Auckland
Umpires: Phil Jones (NZ) and Derek Walker (NZ)
Player of the match: Shahid Afridi (Pak)

- New Zealand won the toss and elected to field.
- Todd Astle (NZ) made his T20I debut.
- Mohammad Amir made his return to international cricket after serving a five-year suspension for spot-fixing.

=== 2nd T20I ===
17 January
19:00 (D/N)
Scorecard

| Pakistan; 168/7 (20 overs) | v | New Zealand; 171/0 (17.4 overs) |
| Umar Akmal 56* (27); Mitchell McClenaghan 2/23 (4 overs) | | Martin Guptill 87* (58) |

New Zealand won by 10 wickets
Seddon Park, Hamilton
Umpires: Billy Bowden (NZ) and Derek Walker (NZ)
Player of the match: Martin Guptill (NZ)

- Pakistan won the toss and elected to bat.
- Kane Williamson and Martin Guptill's unbeaten 171-run partnership is the highest ever partnership for any wicket in T20Is.
- The score of 169 chased by New Zealand is the highest target chased successfully in T20Is without the loss of a wicket.

=== 3rd T20I ===
22 January
19:00 (D/N)
Scorecard

| New Zealand; 196/5 (20 overs) | v | Pakistan; 101 (16.1 overs) |
| Corey Anderson 82* (42); Wahab Riaz 2/43 (4 overs) | | Sarfaraz Ahmed 41 (36); Grant Elliott 3/7 (2 overs) |

New Zealand won by 95 runs
Westpac Stadium, Wellington
Umpires: Billy Bowden (NZ) and Derek Walker (NZ)
Player of the match: Corey Anderson (NZ)

- Pakistan won the toss and elected to field.

== ODI series ==
=== 1st ODI ===
25 January
11:00
Scorecard

| New Zealand; 280/8 (50 overs) | v | Pakistan; 210 (46 overs) |
| Henry Nicholls 82 (111); Mohammad Amir 3/28 (8.1 overs) | | Babar Azam 62 (76); Trent Boult 4/40 (9 overs) |

New Zealand won by 70 runs
Basin Reserve, Wellington
Umpires: Nigel Llong (Eng) and Derek Walker (NZ)
Player of the match: Henry Nicholls (NZ)

- Pakistan won the toss and elected to field.
- This was the first ODI match held at the Basin Reserve since March 2005.

=== 2nd ODI ===
28 January
14:00 (D/N)
Scorecard

| New Zealand | v | Pakistan |

Match abandoned
McLean Park, Napier
Umpires: Billy Bowden (NZ) and Bruce Oxenford (Aus)

- No toss.
- The match was abandoned without a ball bowled at 18:25 due to rain and a wet outfield.

=== 3rd ODI ===
31 January
11:00 (D/N)
Scorecard

| Pakistan; 290 (47.3 overs) | v | New Zealand; 265/7 (42.4 overs) |
| Babar Azam 83 (77); Adam Milne 3/49 (9.3 overs) | | Kane Williamson 84 (86); Azhar Ali 2/37 (7 overs) |

New Zealand won by 3 wickets (DLS method)
Eden Park, Auckland
Umpires: Billy Bowden (NZ) and Nigel Llong (Eng)
Player of the match: Martin Guptill (NZ)

- Pakistan won the toss and elected to bat.
- Rain stopped play during the New Zealand innings and the match was reduced to a 43 over game, with a target of 263.
- Umpire Nigel Llong stood in his 100th ODI match.
- Corey Anderson (NZ) became the fastest player to score 50 sixes in ODIs, achieving this in 33 innings.
- This was the first time that two players (Luke Ronchi and Martin Guptill) took four catches each in one innings of an ODI match.
