= Umar Islam =

Pakistani cricketer (born 1997)

Personal information
- Born: 20 March 1997 (age 29)
- Source: Cricinfo, 2 February 2018

Umar Islam (born 20 March 1997) is a Pakistani cricketer. He made his List A debut for Peshawar in the 2017–18 Regional One Day Cup on 2 February 2018.
