= Abid Ali (cricketer) =

Pakistani cricketer

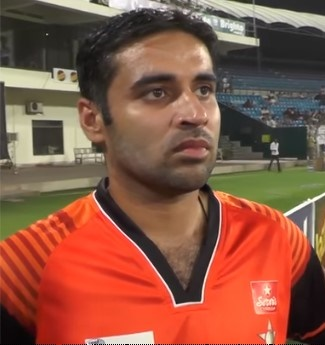

Personal information
- Born: 16 October 1987 (age 39); Lahore, Punjab, Pakistan
- Batting: Right-handed
- Bowling: Right-arm leg break
- Role: Opening batter

International information
- National side: Pakistan (2019–2021)
- Test debut (cap 239): 11 December 2019 v Sri Lanka
- Last Test: 4 December 2021 v Bangladesh
- ODI debut (cap 223): 29 March 2019 v Australia
- Last ODI: 1 November 2020 v Zimbabwe

Domestic team information
- Years: Team
- 2007/08, 2012/13: Lahore Ravi
- 2008/09–2009/10: Lahore Shalimar
- 2015/16–2017/18: Islamabad
- 2019/20: Sindh
- 2020/21–2022/23: Central Punjab
- 2023/24–present: Lahore Whites (squad no. 60)

Career statistics
Competition	Test	ODI	FC	LA
Matches	16	6	176	113
Runs scored	1,180	234	11,696	3,874
Batting average	49.16	39.00	40.33	36.89
100s/50s	4/3	1/1	31/45	6/26
Top score	215*	112	249*	209*
Catches/stumpings	6/–	3/–	129/3	55/7
- Source: Cricinfo, 25 June 2026

Abid Ali (born 16 October 1987) is a Pakistani international cricketer. He made his List A debut in 2005 and first-class cricket debut in 2007. He made his international debut for the Pakistan cricket team in March 2019. Prior to his international debut, he had scored 6,700 runs in more than 100 first-class matches and made 3,000 runs in List A cricket. He is the first male cricketer to score a century on both Test and One Day International (ODI) debut.

== Domestic career ==
He made his first-class debut for Lahore Ravi in the 2007–08 Quaid-e-Azam Trophy in December 2007. In October 2017, he carried his bat playing for Islamabad against National Bank of Pakistan in the 2017–18 Quaid-e-Azam Trophy, making 231 not out. He was the leading run-scorer for Islamabad in the 2017–18 Quaid-e-Azam Trophy, with 541 runs in seven matches.

In February 2018, during the 2017–18 Regional One Day Cup tournament, he scored 209 not out against Peshawar. This was the highest List A score by a Pakistani batsman and he became the fourth batsman from Pakistan to score 200 runs or more in a List A match.

In April 2018, he was named in Federal Areas' squad for the 2018 Pakistan Cup. In Federal Areas' second match of the tournament, he scored 109 runs, with Federal Areas going on to win by 149 runs. In March 2019, he was named in Khyber Pakhtunkhwa's squad for the 2019 Pakistan Cup. In September 2019, he was named in Sindh's squad for the 2019–20 Quaid-e-Azam Trophy tournament.

During Pakistan's domestic cricket off-season, he has also played in domestic cricket in the United Arab Emirates. In August 2020, he was named in Central Punjab's squad for the 2020–21 domestic season.

== International career ==
In March 2019, he was named in Pakistan's ODI squad for their series against Australia. He made his debut on 29 March becoming the fifteenth batsman, and third for Pakistan, to score a century on his ODI debut. He made 112 runs before being dismissed, the highest score by a batsman for Pakistan on debut in an ODI.

In April 2019, he was named in Pakistan's preliminary squad for the 2019 Cricket World Cup although he did not make the final squad.

In October 2019, he was named in the Test squad for the tour to Australia although he did not play. He made his Test debut later in the year against the touring Sri Lankans. On debut, he scored a century, becoming the first male cricketer to score a century on both Test and ODI debut. In the second Test match against Sri Lanka, he scored 174 runs in the second innings of the match, becoming the first batsman for Pakistan to score hundreds in each of his first two Tests. His 278 run partnership with Shan Masood was the second-highest opening stand for Pakistan in Test cricket. He was named both the player of the match and the player of the series.

In June 2020, he was named in a 29-man squad for Pakistan's tour to England during the COVID-19 pandemic. In July, he was shortlisted in Pakistan's 20-man squad for the Test matches against England. In October 2020, he was named in a 22-man squad of "probables" for Pakistan's home series against Zimbabwe. In November 2020, he was named in Pakistan's 35-man squad for their tour to New Zealand. In January 2021, he was named in Pakistan's Test squad for their series against South Africa.

In May 2021, in the second match against Zimbabwe, he scored his first double century in Test cricket, with 215 not out. He was the first opener from Pakistan to score a Test double century in Zimbabwe.

== Personal life ==
In December 2021, while playing in a match in the 2021–22 Quaid-e-Azam Trophy, Abid complained of chest pains, and was taken to hospital. He was later diagnosed with acute coronary syndrome. The following day, he underwent an angioplasty.
