= List of centuries scored on Test cricket debut =

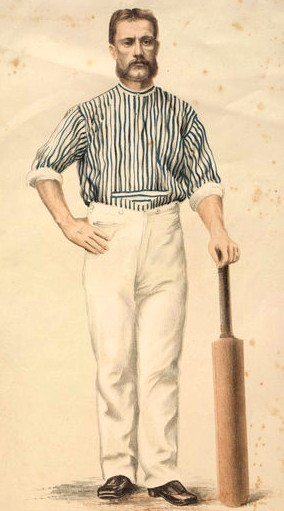
Australia's Charles Bannerman was the first cricketer to score a century on Test debut, in the first Test match.

For a cricketer to score a century (100 runs or more) on his Test match debut is considered a notable achievement, and as of 28 June 2025 it has been accomplished 119 times by 117 players with South African batter Lhuan-dre Pretorius the most recent player to make the list with a century on debut against Zimbabwe. Two of those players, Lawrence Rowe and Yasir Hameed, have scored centuries in both innings of their debut match. Furthermore, Rowe had scored 214 in his first innings, which makes him the only player so far (as of 2025) to score a double century and a century in his debut test. Players representing all 12 Test-playing nations have scored centuries on Test debut.

In the first Test match played, between Australia and England in March 1877, Charles Bannerman became the first player to score a century in Test cricket. In a match in which no other player scored more than 20 runs in either innings for Australia, Bannerman scored 165 not out. That score remained the highest on debut until R. E. Foster scored 287 for England against Australia in 1903. Foster's innings was the highest score in Test cricket until 1930, and remains the highest score amongst Test debutants. His double-century is one of seven made on Test debut, the other six were scored by Lawrence Rowe, Brendon Kuruppu, Mathew Sinclair, Jacques Rudolph, Kyle Mayers and Devon Conway. Nine players (Bill Ponsford, Doug Walters, Alvin Kallicharran, Mohammad Azharuddin, Greg Blewett, Sourav Ganguly, Rohit Sharma, James Neesham, and Abid Ali) went on to make centuries in the second Test as well. Mohammad Azharuddin is the only player to score centuries in his first three Tests.

When he scored his debut hundred, Bangladesh's Mohammad Ashraful became the youngest player to score a century in Test cricket, at the age of 17 years and 61 days. Adam Voges is the oldest player to have done so on debut, aged 35 years and 243 days when he scored 130 not out for Australia against the West Indies in June 2015. The 100th century on Test debut was by South African Stiaan van Zyl, who scored 101* against the West Indies in Centurion in December 2014, whilst the 100th player to score a century on Test debut was his compatriot Stephen Cook, who scored 115 against England at the same ground in 2016.

The fastest century on Test debut was made by Shikhar Dhawan, off 85 balls. Josh Inglis is second with 90 balls, and Dwayne Smith is third with 93 balls.

David Hopps asked "Why is it that 100 Test batsmen, previously unchosen, have now trodden this path?" He notes, "There is often an advantage that bowlers have had no time to explore their deficiencies, but most influential of all must be the hunger that runs through their veins."

== Key ==
| Notation | Meaning |
|---|---|
| | Batsman scored century in country's inaugural Test |
| * | The player remained not out. |
| Inn. | The innings of the match in which the player scored his century. |
| Test | The number of the Test match played in that series (for example, 1/3 denotes the first Test in a three match series). |
| Date | The date on which the match began. |

== Test centuries on debut ==
Cricketers that have scored a century on Test debut
| No. | Batsman (Note: Names sort based on last name, except for some Bangladeshi, Indian and Pakistani players, whose names are sorted on first name due to various naming conventions.) | Score | Inn. | For | Against | Test | Venue | Date | Result | Ref. |
|---|---|---|---|---|---|---|---|---|---|---|
| 1 | Charles Bannerman | 165* | 1 | Australia (Note: Prior to Australian federation in 1901, there was no national flag of Australia.) | England | 1/2 | Melbourne Cricket Ground, Melbourne | 15 March 1877 | Won | |
| 2 | W. G. Grace | 152 | 1 | England | Australia | 1/1 | The Oval, London | 6 September 1880 | Won | |
| 3 | Harry Graham | 107 | 2 | Australia | England | 1/3 | Lord's, London | 17 July 1893 | Drawn | |
| 4 | K. S. Ranjitsinhji | 154* | 3 | England | Australia | 2/3 | Old Trafford, Manchester | 16 July 1896 | Lost | |
| 5 | Pelham Warner | 132* | 3 | England | South Africa (Note: Prior to the unification of the South African colonies in 1910, there was no national flag of South Africa.) | 1/2 | Old Wanderers, Johannesburg | 14 February 1899 | Won | |
| 6 | Reggie Duff | 104 | 3 | Australia | England | 2/5 | Melbourne Cricket Ground, Melbourne | 1 January 1902 | Won | |
| 7 | R. E. Foster | 287 | 2 | England | Australia | 1/5 | Sydney Cricket Ground, Sydney | 11 December 1903 | Won | |
| 8 | George Gunn | 119 | 1 | England | Australia | 1/5 | Sydney Cricket Ground, Sydney | 13 December 1907 | Lost | |
| 9 | Roger Hartigan | 116 | 3 | Australia | England | 3/5 | Adelaide Oval, Adelaide | 10 January 1908 | Won | |
| 10 | Herbie Collins | 104 | 3 | Australia | England | 1/5 | Sydney Cricket Ground, Sydney | 17 December 1920 | Won | |
| 11 | Bill Ponsford | 110 | 1 | Australia | England | 1/5 | Sydney Cricket Ground, Sydney | 19 December 1924 | Won | |
| 12 | Archie Jackson | 164 | 2 | Australia | England | 4/5 | Adelaide Oval, Adelaide | 1 February 1929 | Lost | |
| 13 | George Headley | 176 | 3 | West Indies | England | 1/4 | Kensington Oval, Bridgetown | 11 January 1930 | Drawn | |
| 14 | Jackie Mills | 117 | 1 | New Zealand | England | 2/4 | Basin Reserve, Wellington | 24 January 1930 | Drawn | |
| 15 | Nawab of Pataudi | 102 | 2 | England | Australia | 1/5 | Sydney Cricket Ground, Sydney | 2 December 1932 | Won | |
| 16 | Bryan Valentine | 136 | 2 | England | India | 1/3 | Gymkhana Ground, Bombay | 15 December 1933 | Won | |
| 17 | Lala Amarnath | 118 | 3 | India | England | 1/3 | Gymkhana Ground, Bombay | 15 December 1933 | Lost | |
| 18 | Paul Gibb | 106 | 3 | England | South Africa | 1/5 | Old Wanderers, Johannesburg | 24 December 1938 | Drawn | |
| 19 | Billy Griffith | 140 | 1 | England | West Indies | 2/4 | Queen's Park Oval, Port of Spain | 11 February 1948 | Drawn | |
| 20 | Andy Ganteaume | 112 | 2 | West Indies | England | 2/4 | Queen's Park Oval, Port of Spain | 11 February 1948 | Drawn | |
| 21 | Jim Burke | 101* | 3 | Australia | England | 4/5 | Adelaide Oval, Adelaide | 2 February 1951 | Won | |
| 22 | Peter May | 138 | 2 | England | South Africa | 4/5 | Headingley, Leeds | 26 July 1951 | Drawn | |
| 23 | Deepak Shodhan | 110 | 2 | India | Pakistan | 5/5 | Eden Gardens, Calcutta | 12 December 1952 | Drawn | |
| 24 | Bruce Pairaudeau | 115 | 2 | West Indies | India | 1/5 | Queen's Park Oval, Port of Spain | 21 January 1953 | Drawn | |
| 25 | Collie Smith | 104 | 3 | West Indies | Australia | 1/5 | Sabina Park, Kingston | 26 March 1955 | Lost | |
| 26 | A. G. Kripal Singh | 100* | 1 | India | New Zealand | 1/5 | Fateh Maidan, Hyderabad | 19 November 1955 | Drawn | |
| 27 | Conrad Hunte | 142 | 1 | West Indies | Pakistan | 1/5 | Kensington Oval, Bridgetown | 17 January 1958 | Drawn | |
| 28 | Arthur Milton | 104* | 2 | England | New Zealand | 3/5 | Headingley, Leeds | 3 July 1958 | Won | |
| 29 | Abbas Ali Baig | 112 | 4 | India | England | 4/5 | Old Trafford, Manchester | 23 July 1959 | Lost | |
| 30 | Hanumant Singh | 105 | 1 | India | England | 4/5 | Feroz Shah Kotla, Delhi | 8 February 1964 | Drawn | |
| 31 | Khalid Ibadulla | 166 | 1 | Pakistan | Australia | 1/1 | National Stadium, Karachi | 24 October 1964 | Drawn | |
| 32 | Bruce Taylor | 105 | 1 | New Zealand | India | 2/4 | Eden Gardens, Calcutta | 5 March 1965 | Drawn | |
| 33 | Doug Walters | 155 | 1 | Australia | England | 1/5 | Brisbane Cricket Ground, Brisbane | 10 December 1965 | Drawn | |
| 34 | John Hampshire | 107 | 2 | England | West Indies | 2/3 | Lord's, London | 26 June 1969 | Drawn | |
| 35 | Gundappa Viswanath | 137 | 3 | India | Australia | 2/5 | Green Park, Kanpur | 15 November 1969 | Drawn | |
| 36 | Greg Chappell | 108 | 2 | Australia | England | 2/7 | WACA Ground, Perth | 11 December 1970 | Drawn | |
| 37 | Lawrence Rowe | 214 | 1 | West Indies | New Zealand | 1/5 | Sabina Park, Kingston | 16 February 1972 | Drawn | |
| 38 | Lawrence Rowe | 100* | 3 | West Indies | New Zealand | 1/5 | Sabina Park, Kingston | 16 February 1972 | Drawn | |
| 39 | Alvin Kallicharran | 100* | 1 | West Indies | New Zealand | 4/5 | Bourda, Georgetown | 6 April 1972 | Drawn | |
| 40 | Rodney Redmond | 107 | 2 | New Zealand | Pakistan | 3/3 | Eden Park, Auckland | 16 February 1973 | Drawn | |
| 41 | Frank Hayes | 106* | 4 | England | West Indies | 1/3 | The Oval, London | 26 July 1973 | Lost | |
| 42 | Gordon Greenidge | 107 | 3 | West Indies | India | 1/5 | KSCA Stadium, Bangalore | 22 November 1974 | Won | |
| 43 | Leonard Baichan | 105* | 4 | West Indies | Pakistan | 1/2 | Gaddafi Stadium, Lahore | 15 February 1975 | Drawn | |
| 44 | Gary Cosier | 109 | 2 | Australia | West Indies | 3/6 | Melbourne Cricket Ground, Melbourne | 26 December 1975 | Won | |
| 45 | Surinder Amarnath | 124 | 2 | India | New Zealand | 1/3 | Eden Park, Auckland | 24 January 1976 | Won | |
| 46 | Javed Miandad | 163 | 1 | Pakistan | New Zealand | 1/3 | Gaddafi Stadium, Lahore | 9 October 1976 | Won | |
| 47 | Basil Williams | 100 | 3 | West Indies | Australia | 3/5 | Bourda, Georgetown | 31 March 1978 | Lost | |
| 48 | Dirk Wellham | 103 | 3 | Australia | England | 6/6 | The Oval, London | 27 August 1981 | Drawn | |
| 49 | Saleem Malik | 100* | 3 | Pakistan | Sri Lanka | 1/3 | National Stadium, Karachi | 5 March 1982 | Won | |
| 50 | Kepler Wessels | 162 | 2 | Australia | England | 2/5 | Brisbane Cricket Ground, Brisbane | 26 November 1982 | Won | |
| 51 | Wayne Phillips | 159 | 1 | Australia | Pakistan | 1/5 | WACA Ground, Perth | 11 November 1983 | Won | |
| 52 | Mohammad Azharuddin | 110 | 1 | India | England | 3/5 | Eden Gardens, Calcutta | 31 December 1984 | Drawn | |
| 53 | Brendon Kuruppu | 201* | 1 | Sri Lanka | New Zealand | 1/1 | Colombo Cricket Club Ground, Colombo | 16 April 1987 | Drawn | |
| 54 | Mark Greatbatch | 107* | 3 | New Zealand | England | 2/3 | Eden Park, Auckland | 25 February 1988 | Drawn | |
| 55 | Mark Waugh | 138 | 1 | Australia | England | 4/5 | Adelaide Oval, Adelaide | 25 January 1991 | Drawn | |
| 56 | Andrew Hudson | 163 | 2 | South Africa | West Indies | 1/1 | Kensington Oval, Bridgetown | 18 April 1992 | Lost | |
| 57 | Romesh Kaluwitharana | 132* | 2 | Sri Lanka | Australia | 1/3 | Sinhalese Sports Club, Colombo | 17 August 1992 | Lost | |
| 58 | Dave Houghton | 121 | 1 | Zimbabwe | India | 1/1 | Harare Sports Club, Harare | 18 October 1992 | Drawn | |
| 59 | Pravin Amre | 103 | 2 | India | South Africa | 1/4 | Kingsmead, Durban | 13 November 1992 | Drawn | |
| 60 | Graham Thorpe | 114* | 3 | England | Australia | 3/6 | Trent Bridge, Nottingham | 1 July 1993 | Drawn | |
| 61 | Greg Blewett | 102* | 2 | Australia | England | 4/5 | Adelaide Oval, Adelaide | 26 January 1995 | Lost | |
| 62 | Sourav Ganguly | 131 | 2 | India | England | 2/3 | Lord's, London | 20 June 1996 | Drawn | |
| 63 | Mohammad Wasim | 109* | 4 | Pakistan | New Zealand | 1/2 | Gaddafi Stadium, Lahore | 21 November 1996 | Lost | |
| 64 | Ali Naqvi | 115 | 1 | Pakistan | South Africa | 1/3 | Rawalpindi Cricket Stadium, Rawalpindi | 6 November 1997 | Drawn | |
| 65 | Azhar Mahmood | 128* | 1 | Pakistan | South Africa | 1/3 | Rawalpindi Cricket Stadium, Rawalpindi | 6 November 1997 | Drawn | |
| 66 | Mathew Sinclair | 214 | 1 | New Zealand | West Indies | 2/2 | Basin Reserve, Wellington | 26 December 1999 | Won | |
| 67 | Younus Khan | 107 | 3 | Pakistan | Sri Lanka | 1/3 | Rawalpindi Cricket Stadium, Rawalpindi | 26 February 2000 | Lost | |
| 68 | Aminul Islam | 145 | 1 | Bangladesh | India | 1/1 | Bangabandhu National Stadium, Dhaka | 10 November 2000 | Lost | |
| 69 | Hamilton Masakadza | 119 | 3 | Zimbabwe | West Indies | 2/2 | Harare Sports Club, Harare | 27 July 2001 | Drawn | |
| 70 | Thilan Samaraweera | 103* | 2 | Sri Lanka | India | 3/3 | Sinhalese Sports Club, Colombo | 29 August 2001 | Won | |
| 71 | Taufeeq Umar | 104 | 2 | Pakistan | Bangladesh | 1/3 | Multan Cricket Stadium, Multan | 29 August 2001 | Won | |
| 72 | Mohammad Ashraful | 114 | 3 | Bangladesh | Sri Lanka | 2/3 | Sinhalese Sports Club, Colombo | 6 September 2001 | Lost | |
| 73 | Virender Sehwag | 105 | 1 | India | South Africa | 1/2 | Chevrolet Park, Bloemfontein | 3 November 2001 | Lost | |
| 74 | Lou Vincent | 104 | 1 | New Zealand | Australia | 3/3 | WACA Ground, Perth | 30 November 2001 | Drawn | |
| 75 | Scott Styris | 107 | 1 | New Zealand | West Indies | 2/2 | Queen's Park, St. George's | 28 June 2002 | Drawn | |
| 76 | Jacques Rudolph | 222* | 2 | South Africa | Bangladesh | 1/2 | M. A. Aziz Stadium, Chittagong | 24 April 2003 | Won | |
| 77 | Yasir Hameed | 170 | 2 | Pakistan | Bangladesh | 1/3 | National Stadium, Karachi | 20 August 2003 | Won | |
| 78 | Yasir Hameed | 105 | 4 | Pakistan | Bangladesh | 1/3 | National Stadium, Karachi | 20 August 2003 | Won | |
| 79 | Dwayne Smith | 105* | 4 | West Indies | South Africa | 3/4 | Newlands, Cape Town | 2 January 2004 | Drawn | |
| 80 | Andrew Strauss | 112 | 2 | England | New Zealand | 1/3 | Lord's, London | 20 May 2004 | Won | |
| 81 | Michael Clarke | 151 | 1 | Australia | India | 1/4 | M. Chinnaswamy Stadium, Bangalore | 6 October 2004 | Won | |
| 82 | Alastair Cook | 104* | 3 | England | India | 1/3 | VCA Ground, Nagpur | 1 March 2006 | Drawn | |
| 83 | Matt Prior | 126* | 1 | England | West Indies | 1/4 | Lord's, London | 17 May 2007 | Drawn | |
| 84 | Marcus North | 117 | 1 | Australia | South Africa | 1/3 | New Wanderers, Johannesburg | 26 February 2009 | Won | |
| 85 | Fawad Alam | 168 | 3 | Pakistan | Sri Lanka | 2/3 | P. Sara Oval, Colombo | 26 February 2009 | Lost | |
| 86 | Jonathan Trott | 119 | 3 | England | Australia | 5/5 | The Oval, London | 20 August 2009 | Won | |
| 87 | Umar Akmal | 129 | 2 | Pakistan | New Zealand | 1/3 | University Oval, Dunedin | 24 November 2009 | Lost | |
| 88 | Adrian Barath | 104 | 3 | West Indies | Australia | 1/3 | Brisbane Cricket Ground, Brisbane | 26 November 2009 | Lost | |
| 89 | Alviro Petersen | 100 | 1 | South Africa | India | 2/2 | Eden Gardens, Kolkata | 14 February 2010 | Lost | |
| 90 | Suresh Raina | 120 | 2 | India | Sri Lanka | 2/3 | Sinhalese Sports Club, Colombo | 26 July 2010 | Drawn | |
| 91 | Kane Williamson | 131 | 2 | New Zealand | India | 1/3 | Sardar Patel Stadium, Ahmedabad | 4 November 2010 | Drawn | |
| 92 | Kirk Edwards | 110 | 3 | West Indies | India | 3/3 | Windsor Park, Roseau | 6 July 2011 | Drawn | |
| 93 | Shaun Marsh | 141 | 2 | Australia | Sri Lanka | 2/3 | Pallekele International Cricket Stadium, Pallekele | 8 September 2011 | Drawn | |
| 94 | Abul Hasan | 113 | 1 | Bangladesh | West Indies | 2/2 | Khulna Divisional Stadium, Khulna | 21 November 2012 | Lost | |
| 95 | Faf du Plessis | 110* | 4 | South Africa | Australia | 2/3 | Adelaide Oval, Adelaide | 22 November 2012 | Drawn | |
| 96 | Hamish Rutherford | 171 | 2 | New Zealand | England | 1/3 | University Oval, Dunedin | 8 March 2013 | Drawn | |
| 97 | Shikhar Dhawan | 187 | 2 | India | Australia | 3/4 | PCA Stadium, Mohali | 14 March 2013 | Won | |
| 98 | Rohit Sharma | 177 | 2 | India | West Indies | 1/2 | Eden Gardens, Kolkata | 6 November 2013 | Won | |
| 99 | Jimmy Neesham | 137* | 3 | New Zealand | India | 2/2 | Basin Reserve, Wellington | 14 February 2014 | Drawn | |
| 100 | Stiaan van Zyl | 101* | 1 | South Africa | West Indies | 1/3 | Centurion Park, Centurion | 17 December 2014 | Won | |
| 101 | Adam Voges | 130* | 2 | Australia | West Indies | 1/2 | Windsor Park, Roseau | 3 June 2015 | Won | |
| 102 | Stephen Cook | 115 | 1 | South Africa | England | 4/4 | Centurion Park, Centurion | 22 January 2016 | Won | |
| 103 | Keaton Jennings | 112 | 1 | England | India | 4/5 | Wankhede Stadium, Mumbai | 8 December 2016 | Lost | |
| 104 | Tom Blundell | 107* | 2 | New Zealand | West Indies | 1/2 | Basin Reserve, Wellington | 1 December 2017 | Won | |
| 105 | Kevin O'Brien | 118 | 3 | Ireland | Pakistan | 1/1 | Malahide Cricket Club Ground, Malahide | 11 May 2018 | Lost | |
| 106 | Prithvi Shaw | 134 | 1 | India | West Indies | 1/2 | Saurashtra Cricket Association Stadium, Rajkot | 4 October 2018 | Won | |
| 107 | Ben Foakes | 107 | 1 | England | Sri Lanka | 1/3 | Galle International Stadium, Galle | 6 November 2018 | Won | |
| 108 | Abid Ali | 109* | 2 | Pakistan | Sri Lanka | 1/2 | Rawalpindi Cricket Stadium, Rawalpindi | 14 December 2019 | Drawn | |
| 109 | Kyle Mayers | 210* | 4 | West Indies | Bangladesh | 1/2 | Zohur Ahmed Chowdhury Stadium, Chittagong | 3 February 2021 | Won | |
| 110 | Pathum Nissanka | 103 | 3 | Sri Lanka | West Indies | 1/2 | Sir Vivian Richards Stadium, Antigua | 21 March 2021 | Drawn | |
| 111 | Devon Conway | 200 | 1 | New Zealand | England | 1/2 | Lord's, London | 2 June 2021 | Drawn | |
| 112 | Shreyas Iyer | 105 | 1 | India | New Zealand | 1/2 | Green Park, Kanpur | 25 November 2021 | Drawn | |
| 113 | Zakir Hasan | 100 | 4 | Bangladesh | India | 1/2 | Zohur Ahmed Chowdhury Stadium, Chattogram | 14 December 2022 | Lost | |
| 114 | Lorcan Tucker | 108 | 3 | Ireland | Bangladesh | 1/1 | Sher-e-Bangla National Cricket Stadium, Mirpur, Dhaka | 4 April 2023 | Lost | |
| 115 | Yashasvi Jaiswal | 171 | 1 | India | West Indies | 1/2 | Windsor Park, Roseau, Dominica | 13 July 2023 | Won | |
| 116 | Kamran Ghulam | 118 | 1 | Pakistan | England | 2/3 | Multan Cricket Stadium, Multan, Pakistan | 15 October 2024 | Won | |
| 117 | Ismat Alam | 101 | 3 | Afghanistan | Zimbabwe | 2/2 | Queens Sports Club, Bulawayo, Zimbabwe | 2 January 2025 | Won | |
| 118 | Josh Inglis | 102 | 1 | Australia | Sri Lanka | 1/2 | Galle International Stadium, Galle, Sri Lanka | 29 January 2025 | Won | |
| 119 | Lhuan-dre Pretorius | 153 | 1 | South Africa | Zimbabwe | 1/2 | Queen's Sports Club, Bulawayo, Zimbabwe | 28 June 2025 | Won | |
| 120 | Azan Awais | 103 | 1 | Pakistan | Bangladesh | 1/2 | Sher-e-Bangla National Cricket Stadium, Dhaka, Bangladesh | 8 May 2026 | Lost | |
| 121 | Rahmanullah | 113 | 1 | Afghanistan | Zimbabwe | 1/2 | Sharjah Cricket Stadium, Sharjah, United Arab Emirates | 5 November 2026 | Drawn | |
| 122 | Naseer Khan Maroofkhil | 101 | 1 | Afghanistan | Zimbabwe | 2/2 | Sharjah Cricket Stadium, Sharjah, United Arab Emirates | 13 November 2026 | Lost | |
