= Sajid Rehman =

Pakistani cricketer

Personal information
- Full name: Sajid Rehman
- Source: Cricinfo, 29 October 2017

Sajid Rehman is a Pakistani cricketer. He made his first-class debut for Islamabad in the 2017–18 Quaid-e-Azam Trophy on 29 October 2017. He made his List A debut for Islamabad in the 2017–18 Regional One Day Cup on 2 February 2018.
