= Raees Ahmed =

Pakistani cricketer (born 1994)

Personal information
- Full name: Raees Ahmed
- Born: 13 December 1994 (age 31); Faisalabad, Pakistan
- Batting: Right-handed
- Bowling: Right-arm offbreak
- Source: Cricinfo, 29 September 2017

Raees Ahmed (born 13 December 1994) is a Pakistani cricketer who plays for Faisalabad. He made his first-class debut for Faisalabad in the 2017–18 Quaid-e-Azam Trophy on 26 September 2017. He made his List A debut for Faisalabad in the 2017–18 Regional One Day Cup on 27 January 2018. He made his Twenty20 debut for Peshawar in the 2018–19 National T20 Cup on 11 December 2018.
