= Pakistani cricket team in New Zealand in 2009–10 =

Pakistan cricket team in New Zealand in 2009–10
| | Pakistan | New Zealand |
- Dates: 18 November – 15 December 2009
| Captains | Mohammad Yousuf | Daniel Vettori |

Test series
- Result: 3-match series drawn 1–1
| Most runs | Umar Akmal (379) | Ross Taylor (301) |
| Most wickets | Mohammad Asif (19) | Iain O'Brien (15) |

The Pakistan cricket team toured New Zealand in November and December 2009 for a three-match Test series.

== Squads ==
Pakistan: Mohammad Yousuf (c), Kamran Akmal (v.c), Abdur Rauf, Danish Kaneria, Faisal Iqbal, Fawad Alam, Imran Farhat, Khurram Manzoor, Mohammad Aamer, Mohammad Asif, Saeed Ajmal, Salman Butt, Sarfraz Ahmed(wk), Shoaib Malik, Umar Akmal, Umar Gul, Yasir Arafat.

New Zealand: Daniel Vettori (C), Shane Bond, Grant Elliott, Daniel Flynn, Peter Fulton, Martin Guptill, Brendon McCullum, Tim McIntosh, Chris Martin, Iain O'Brien, Jeetan Patel, Ross Taylor, Daryl Tuffey.

== Tour Matches ==
18 – 20 November
Scorecard

| New Zealand Invitation XI | v | Pakistanis |
| 234 (73.1 Overs); Reece Young 75 (105); Abdur Rauf 4/43 (14.1 Overs) | | 286 (74.3 Overs); Fawad Alam 77 (145); Daryl Tuffey 2/47 (19 Overs) |
| 231/2 (71 Overs); Tim McIntosh 131* (196); Abdur Rauf 1/11 (6 Overs) |

Match Drawn
Queenstown Events Centre
Umpires: GAV Baxter and CB Gaffaney

- New Zealand Invitation XI won the toss and chose to bat.
- Players per side 12 (11 batting, 11 fielding)

== Test series ==
=== 1st Test ===
24–28 November
Scorecard

| New Zealand | v | Pakistan |
| 429 (131.5 overs); Daniel Vettori 99 (133); Mohammad Asif 4/108 (34 overs) | | 332 (96.5 overs); Umar Akmal 129 (160); Shane Bond 5/107 (27.5 overs) |
| 153 (67 Overs); Ross Taylor 59 (122); Mohammad Asif 4/43 (20 overs) | | 218 (76 overs); Umar Akmal 75 (222); Shane Bond 3/46 (21 overs) |

New Zealand won by 32 runs
University Oval, Dunedin
Umpires: Billy Doctrove (WI) and Simon Taufel (AUS)
Player of the match: Shane Bond (NZ)

- Pakistan won the toss and elected to field.
- Rain interrupted play on days 2 and 4.
- Umar Akmal (Pak) made his Test debut. His century was the second by a Pakistan player made away from home on debut.

=== 2nd Test ===
3–7 December 2009
Scorecard

| Pakistan | v | New Zealand |
| 264 (88.2 overs); Kamran Akmal 70 (85); Daniel Vettori 4/58 (22 overs) | | 99 (36.5 overs); Ross Taylor 30 (40); Mohammad Asif 4/40 (12.5 overs) |
| 239 (86.3 overs); Mohammad Yousuf 83 (200); Chris Martin 4/52 (19 overs) | | 263 (82.5 overs); Ross Taylor 97 (135); Mohammad Asif 5/67 (23.5 overs) |

Pakistan won by 141 runs
Basin Reserve, Wellington
Umpires: Rudi Koertzen (SA) and Simon Taufel (Aus)
Player of the match: Mohammad Asif (Pak)

- New Zealand won the toss and elected to field.

=== 3rd Test ===
11–15 December
Scorecard

| Pakistan | v | New Zealand |
| 223 (64.3 overs); Imran Farhat 117* (169); Iain O'Brien 4/35 (15 overs) | | 471 (139 overs); Daniel Vettori 134 (186); Danish Kaneria 7/168 (53 overs) |
| 455 (193.2 overs); Mohammad Yousuf 89 (212); Martin Guptill 3/37 (13.2 overs) | | 90/0 (19 overs); BJ Watling 60 (62) |

Match drawn
McLean Park, Napier
Umpires: Billy Doctrove (Win) and Rudi Koertzen (SA)
Player of the match: Daniel Vettori (NZ)

- Pakistan won the toss and elected to bat.
- Rain interrupted play on day 4 and stopped play in the final session on day 5.
- BJ Watling (NZ) made his debut in Tests.

== Notes ==
- The Umpire Decision Review System (UDRS) which became official from 1 October 2009 was used for the first time during this series. The UDRS allows players to challenge the umpire's decisions for a specific number of times per innings.

== Media coverage ==
Television

- SKY Sport (live) – New Zealand
- Sky Sports (live) – European Countries
- Fox Sports (live) – Australia
- Neo Cricket (live) – India, Pakistan
- Supersport (live) – South Africa
