= Australian cricket team against Pakistan in the UAE in 2018–19 =

International cricket tour

Australian cricket team against Pakistan in 2018–19
	Pakistan	Australia
- Dates: 22 – 31 March 2019
Captains	Shoaib Malik (Note: Imad Wasim captained Pakistan for the 4th and 5th ODIs.)	Aaron Finch

One Day International series
- Results: Australia won the 5-match series 5–0
Most runs	Haris Sohail (291)	Aaron Finch (451)
Most wickets	Usman Shinwari (5)	Nathan Coulter-Nile (7); Adam Zampa (7)
- Player of the series: Aaron Finch (Aus)

The Australian cricket team toured the United Arab Emirates in March 2019 to play five One Day International (ODI) matches against Pakistan. The fixtures were part of both teams' preparation for the 2019 Cricket World Cup.

Ahead of the tour, the Pakistan Cricket Board (PCB) were in talks with Cricket Australia with a view to play some of the matches in Pakistan. On 10 February 2019, the PCB confirmed the dates of the tour, with all the fixtures taking place in the UAE.

The bans on Steve Smith and David Warner following the 2018 Australian ball-tampering scandal ended on 29 March 2019, coinciding with the date of the fourth ODI match. However, when Cricket Australia named their squad for the tour, Smith and Warner were not included. Trevor Hohns, chairman of the National Selection Panel, said that the best route for them coming back would be through the Indian Premier League.

Pakistan's regular captain, Sarfaraz Ahmed, was rested ahead of the 2019 Cricket World Cup, with Shoaib Malik named as captain of the squad in his place. For the fourth ODI, Imad Wasim captained the side for the first time, after Shoaib Malik was sidelined with a bruised rib. Wasim also captained Pakistan for the fifth and final ODI of the series.

Australia won the series 5–0. It was Australia's first 5–0 series win away from home since they beat the West Indies in 2008.

== Squads ==
ODIs
Pakistan	Australia
Shoaib Malik (c); Mohammad Abbas; Umar Akmal; Abid Ali; Saad Ali; Mohammad Amir; Faheem Ashraf; Mohammad Hasnain; Junaid Khan; Shan Masood; Mohammad Rizwan (wk); Yasir Shah; Usman Shinwari; Haris Sohail; Imam-ul-Haq; Imad Wasim (vc)	Aaron Finch (c); Alex Carey (vc, wk); Pat Cummins (vc); Jason Behrendorff; Nathan Coulter-Nile; Peter Handscomb; Usman Khawaja; Nathan Lyon; Shaun Marsh; Glenn Maxwell; Jhye Richardson; Kane Richardson; Marcus Stoinis; Ashton Turner; Adam Zampa

Pakistan's Faheem Ashraf was rested for the final three matches of the series. Jhye Richardson suffered an injury during the second ODI and was ruled out of Australia's squad for the rest of the series.

== ODI series ==
=== 1st ODI ===
22 March 2019
15:00 (D/N)
Scorecard

Pakistan; 280/5 (50 overs)	v	Australia; 281/2 (49 overs)
Haris Sohail 101* (115); Nathan Coulter-Nile 2/61 (10 overs)		Aaron Finch 116 (135); Mohammad Abbas 1/44 (10 overs)

Australia won by 8 wickets
Sharjah Cricket Stadium, Sharjah
Umpires: Michael Gough (Eng) and Ahsan Raza (Pak)
Player of the match: Aaron Finch (Aus)

- Pakistan won the toss and elected to bat.
- Mohammad Abbas and Shan Masood (Pak) both made their ODI debuts.
- Haris Sohail (Pak) scored his first century in ODIs.

=== 2nd ODI ===
24 March 2019
15:00 (D/N)
Scorecard

Pakistan; 284/7 (50 overs)	v	Australia; 285/2 (47.5 overs)
Mohammad Rizwan 115 (126); Jhye Richardson 2/16 (5 overs)		Aaron Finch 153* (143); Yasir Shah 1/60 (10 overs)

Australia won by 8 wickets
Sharjah Cricket Stadium, Sharjah
Umpires: Kumar Dharmasena (SL) and Shozab Raza (Pak)
Player of the match: Aaron Finch (Aus)

- Pakistan won the toss and elected to bat.
- Mohammad Hasnain (Pak) made his ODI debut.
- Mohammad Rizwan (Pak) scored his first century in ODIs.

=== 3rd ODI ===
27 March 2019
15:00 (D/N)
Scorecard

Australia; 266/6 (50 overs)	v	Pakistan; 186 (44.4 overs)
Aaron Finch 90 (136); Imad Wasim 1/34 (10 overs)		Imam-ul-Haq 46 (72); Adam Zampa 4/43 (9.4 overs)

Australia won by 80 runs
Sheikh Zayed Cricket Stadium, Abu Dhabi
Umpires: Michael Gough (Eng) and Asif Yaqoob (Pak)
Player of the match: Pat Cummins (Aus)

- Australia won the toss and elected to bat.

=== 4th ODI ===
29 March 2019
15:00 (D/N)
Scorecard

Australia; 277/7 (50 overs)	v	Pakistan; 271/8 (50 overs)
Glenn Maxwell 98 (82); Mohammad Hasnain 2/52 (9 overs)		Abid Ali 112 (119); Nathan Coulter-Nile 3/53 (10 overs)

Australia won by 6 runs
Dubai International Cricket Stadium, Dubai
Umpires: Kumar Dharmasena (SL) and Rashid Riaz (Pak)
Player of the match: Glenn Maxwell (Aus)

- Pakistan won the toss and elected to field.
- Abid Ali and Saad Ali (Pak) both made their ODI debuts.
- Imad Wasim captained Pakistan for the first time in ODIs.
- Abid Ali became the fifteenth batsman, and third for Pakistan, to score a century on debut in ODIs. He also made the highest score by a batsman for Pakistan on debut in ODIs.

=== 5th ODI ===
31 March 2019
15:00 (D/N)
Scorecard

Australia; 327/7 (50 overs)	v	Pakistan; 307/7 (50 overs)
Usman Khawaja 98 (111); Usman Shinwari 4/49 (10 overs)		Haris Sohail 130 (129); Jason Behrendorff 3/63 (8 overs)

Australia won by 20 runs
Dubai International Cricket Stadium, Dubai
Umpires: Michael Gough (Eng) and Ahsan Raza (Pak)
Player of the match: Glenn Maxwell (Aus)

- Pakistan won the toss and elected to field.
- Glenn Maxwell (Aus) played in his 100th ODI.
- Aaron Finch (Aus) scored his 4,000th run in ODIs.
