= Mohammad Yousuf (cricketer) =

Pakistani cricket coach and former cricketer

Mohammad Yousuf PP SI
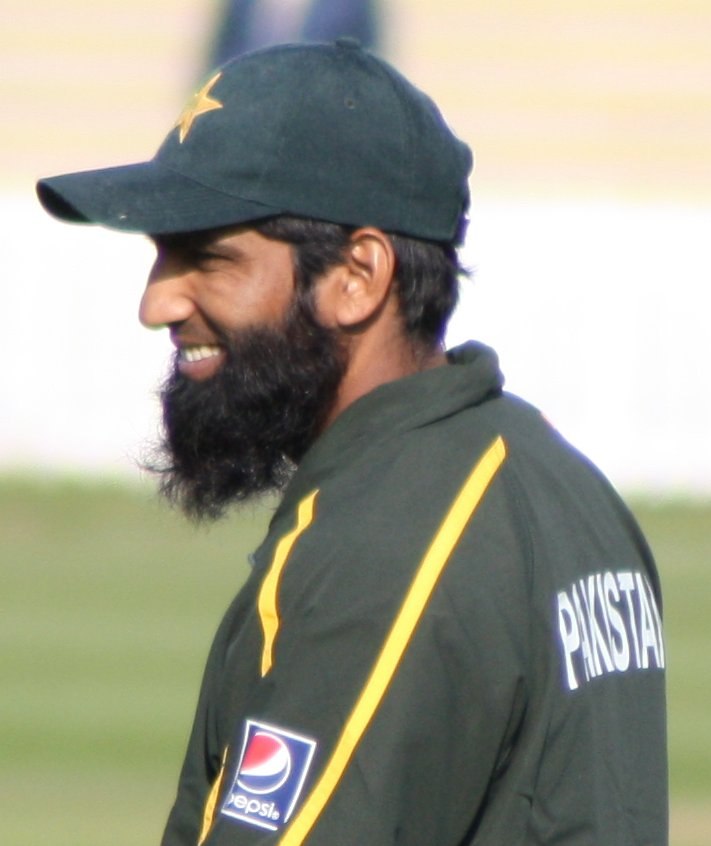

Personal information
- Full name: Mohammad Yousuf
- Born: Yousuf Youhana; 27 August 1974 (age 52); Lahore, Punjab, Pakistan
- Height: 5 ft 10 in (178 cm)
- Batting: Right-handed
- Bowling: Right-arm medium
- Role: Batsman

International information
- National side: Pakistan (1998–2010)
- Test debut (cap 122): 26 February 1998 v South Africa
- Last Test: 26 August 2010 v England
- ODI debut (cap 152): 28 March 1998 v Zimbabwe
- Last ODI: 8 November 2010 v South Africa
- ODI shirt no.: 13
- T20I debut (cap 6): 28 August 2006 v England
- Last T20I: 7 September 2010 v England

Domestic team information
- Years: Team
- 1996/97: Bahawalpur
- 1997/98–2009/10: WAPDA
- 1997/98: Lahore City
- 1999/00–2001/02: PIA
- 2000/01: Lahore Blues
- 2002/03: ZTBL
- 2003/04: Lahore
- 2004/05–2012/13: Lahore Lions
- 2008: Lancashire
- 2010: Islamabad Leopards
- 2010/11: Lahore Lions
- 2011: Warwickshire

Career statistics
Competition	Test	ODI	FC	LA
Matches	90	288	141	338
Runs scored	7,530	9,720	10,505	11,026
Batting average	52.29	41.72	47.96	40.09
100s/50s	24/33	15/64	30/51	15/75
Top score	223	141*	223	141*
Balls bowled	6	2	18	8
Wickets	0	1	0	1
Bowling average	–	1.00	–	13.00
5 wickets in innings	–	0	–	0
10 wickets in match	–	0	–	0
Best bowling	–	1/0	–	1/0
Catches/stumpings	65/–	58/–	84/–	70/–
Medal record
Men's Cricket
Representing Pakistan
ICC Cricket World Cup
Runner-up	1999 England-Wales -Ireland-Scotland-Netherlands
- Source: ESPNcricinfo, 17 February 2018

Mohammad Yousuf PP SI (Punjabi, Urdu: محمد یوسف; formerly Yousuf Youhana, یوسف یوحنا; born 27 August 1974) is a Pakistani cricket coach and former cricketer and captain, who played all three formats. Prior to his conversion to Islam, Yousuf was one of the few Christians to play for the Pakistan national cricket team. Yousuf scored 1,788 runs in 2006 which is a world record for most runs scored in a year in tests at an average of almost 100. He was a part of the Pakistan squad which finished as runners-up at the 1999 Cricket World Cup.

Yousuf was banned from playing international cricket for Pakistan by the Pakistan Cricket Board on 10 March 2010, following an inquiry into the team's defeats during the tour of Australia. An official statement was released by the Pakistan Cricket Board, saying that he would not be selected again because he had created disciplinary problems and infighting within the team.

In reaction to the ban, Yousuf announced his retirement from international cricket on 29 March 2010. However, following Pakistan's disastrous first Test against England in July/August 2010, the PCB decided to ask Yousuf to come out of retirement.

== Early and personal life ==
Yousuf was born in Lahore, Punjab, Pakistan to a Punjabi Christian family. Though a Christian, his forefathers belonged to the Chuhra community, a Dalit caste of sweepers.

As a boy, he couldn't afford cricket gear and played street cricket with his brother's taped tennis ball and wooden planks. As a 12-year-old, he was spotted by the Golden Gymkhana, and he subsequently joined Lahore's Forman Christian College and continued playing until stopping abruptly in early 1994.

Yousuf, hailing from a poor background, was plucked from the obscurity of a tailor's shop in the slums of the eastern city of Lahore to play a local match in the 1990s. His well-crafted shots attracted attention and he rose through the ranks to become one of Pakistan's best batsmen.

=== Conversion to Islam ===
Until his conversion to Islam in 2005, Yousuf was the fourth Christian (and fifth non-Muslim overall) to play for the Pakistan cricket team, following in the footsteps of Wallis Mathias, Antao D'Souza and the Anglo-Pakistani Duncan Sharpe. He also has the distinction of being the first and so far only non-Muslim to captain the country, leading the team in the 2004–05 tour of Australia where he scored a century in the Boxing Day Test at the Melbourne Cricket Ground. He converted to Islam after attending regular preaching sessions of the Tablighi Jamaat, Pakistan's largest non-political religious grouping, whose preachers include Yousuf's former teammate Saeed Anwar and his brother. His wife Tania converted along with him and adopted the Islamic name Fatima. However, the news was kept private for three months due to family reasons as well as his own decision to practice his faith, before his announcement of their conversion publicly in September 2005. "I don't want to give Yousuf my name after what he has done", his mother was quoted as saying by the Daily Times newspaper. "We came to know about his decision when he offered Friday prayers at a local mosque. It was a shock", his mother was reported as saying. However, Yousuf told the BBC of his conversion to Islam: "I cannot tell you what a great feeling it is." As part of his conversion, Yousuf officially changed his name from Yousuf Youhana to Mohammad Yousuf.

Former Pakistan cricketer, sports commentator & former PCB Chairman Ramiz Raja, who himself is Muslim, acknowledged the significance of Yousuf's new faith: "Religion has played an integral part in his growth not just as a cricketer but as a person."

== Cricket career ==
=== Early days ===
He made his Test debut against South Africa in Durban and One Day International debut against Zimbabwe in Harare. He has scored over 9,000 One Day International runs at an average above 40 and over 7,000 Test runs at an average above 50 (2nd highest batting average amongst all Pakistani batsmen) with 24 Test centuries. He has the record of scoring the most runs without being dismissed in One Day International matches, with a total of 405 runs against Zimbabwe in Zimbabwe in 2002–2003. He has also scored a 23-ball fifty and a 68-ball hundred in One Day Internationals. In a Test match, he scored a 27-ball fifty, which is 3rd fastest by any player. He was the top scorer during the successive years of 2002 and 2003 in the world in One Day International match. In 2004, he scored 111 runs against the Australians in the Boxing Day Test. In December 2005, he scored 223 runs against England at Lahore, also earning him the man of the match award. Seven months later in July 2006, when Pakistan toured England, he scored 202 runs and 48 in the first Test, again earning himself the man of the match award. He followed up with 192 in the third Test at Headingley and 128 in the final Test at The Oval.

=== Rise in ranks ===
Yousuf was named CNN-IBN's Cricketer of the Year for 2006, ahead of the likes of Australian captain Ricky Ponting, West Indies Brian Lara, Australian spinner Shane Warne, South Africa's bowling spearhead Makhaya Ntini and Sri Lanka's Muttiah Muralitharan. He was selected as a Wisden Cricketer of the Year in the 2007 edition. Yousuf became the fourth recipient of the ICC 'Test Cricketer of the Year' award for 2007, he scored 944 runs at an average of 94.40 including seven centuries and two fifties in just 10 innings and that was enough to be awarded the honour ahead of English batsman Kevin Pietersen and Australian batsman Ricky Ponting.

A year that started on a promising note, Yousuf carried it forward to break two world records, both held earlier by former West Indian batsman Viv Richards. The 32-year-old Pakistani batsman achieved an unparalleled 1788 runs in just 10 Test matches with the help of twelve centuries which became his second world record. Yousuf was known for his ability to score runs at exceptional rate through his great technique and composed strokeplay. Although capable of hitting the ball hard, Yousuf was quick between the wickets, although he was prone to being run out.

=== Golden 2006 ===
Statistically, the year 2006 is said to be the year of Australia, Muttiah Muralitharan and Yousuf. Yousuf scored 1788 runs at an average of 99.33 in 2006 and broke two of Viv Richards's world records.

It's excellent and slightly unbelievable what he has achieved. Nine hundreds in a year and that many runs is just magnificent. He is a very committed player and an excellent role model, not just for Pakistan but for young cricketers everywhere.

— Former West Indies batsman Brian Lara on Yousuf's achievements.

On 30 November 2006, during the third innings of the final Test between Pakistan and West Indies at Karachi, he surpassed Viv Richards's thirty-year-old record and became the highest scorer in Test matches during a single calendar year. He also broke Zaheer Abbas's record for the most runs made by a Pakistani batsman in a three-Test series. Abbas made 583 runs against the visiting Indians in 1978/79. Yousuf hit nine test centuries in 2006, which is a world record for most centuries in a calendar year. Yousuf also equalled the record held by former Australian batsman Donald Bradman, by scoring six centuries in successive Tests – although it took him only four matches compared with Bradman's six.

After his 191 at Multan he became the first player in Test history to have been dismissed 3 times in the 190s, with all three innings coming in 2006. For his performances in 2006 and 2007, he was named in the ICC Test Team of the Year. For his performances in 2006, he was named in the World Test XI by ESPNcricinfo.

Yousuf is a skilful infielder, with a report prepared by ESPNcricinfo in late 2005 showing that since the 1999 Cricket World Cup, he had effected the seventh highest number of run-outs in ODI cricket of any fieldsman. He is also distinguished by his characteristic celebration after hitting one hundred runs for his country, where he prostrates in thankfulness to Allah in the direction of Mecca. He has observed this act (known as the Sajdah) since his conversion to Islam.

=== Retirement and subsequent return ===
On 29 March 2010, Yousuf announced his retirement from international cricket, two days after the Pakistan Cricket Board imposed an indefinite ban on him. "I received a letter from the PCB that my staying in the team is harmful for the team, so I announce my retirement from international cricket", he said at a press conference in Karachi. On 27 March, Yousuf said that he had decided to retire from international cricket. "Yes, I have decided to retire as Pakistan player and my decision is not an emotional one", Yousuf told press agency AFP, "It's of no use playing if my playing is harmful to the team". He was placed under an indefinite ban by the Pakistan Cricket Board for his disciplinary problems on Pakistan's tour of Australia 2009–2010.

On 1 August 2010, after Pakistan lost the first Test match against England at Trent Bridge, Nottingham, Yousuf was called back in the squad for the rest of the series. He decided not to play the second Test because of tiredness and jet lag. Shortly after the completion of the second test, Pakistani captain Salman Butt announced that he expected Yousuf to return for the third test. The selectors decided to play Yousuf in a tour match against Worcestershire just before the third Test so that his form and fitness could be checked. Yousuf's form check was positive, because on a day inflicted by rain he managed to score 40*. Yousuf then scored 56 against England in the third Test before being caught and bowled by Graeme Swann; in the process Yousuf became Swann's 100th casualty in Test cricket; the day saw a much improved performance by Pakistan as they were eventually bowled out for 308.

In the same tour of England that summer, he participated in the Twenty20 series as well. Despite being considered an "old boys cricketer" and having participated in only a sole T20I in 2006 and considered one who does not slog as often (notable by the low number of sixes he has scored), Yousuf participated and scored 26 off 21 deliveries.

His return continued well when he scored 46 in the second ODI against England. He consistently scored during the five-match England series as Pakistan lost 3–2. Yousuf was subsequently called up to play for Pakistan in all three formats against South Africa in October 2010; however he was not selected for any of the matches.

== Playing style ==
Writing in 2020 on Pakistan's five most stylish batsmen, Shamya Dasgupta portrays Mohammad Yousuf as a rare blend of prolific scoring and aesthetic ease: a languid, supple stroke-maker with an exaggerated backlift, exceptional timing, and an unhurried rhythm that projected calm at the crease. He appeared to create time against the ball, turning innings into composed, flowing passages rather than scrambles for runs. Amid heavyweight batting line-ups, Yousuf's serenity and balance made him a distinctive, near-effortless run-machine.

== Post-retirement ==
=== Coaching career ===
Yousuf had been associated with the National Cricket Academy (NCA) for several years, serving as a batting coach not only for the academy but also intermittently with the Pakistan senior team and the Under-19 squad.

On 4 March 2025, the Pakistan Cricket Board (PCB) officially appointed former captain Mohammad Yousuf as the batting coach of the Pakistan men's national team, replacing Shahid Aslam.

In June 2025, Mohammad Yousuf resigned from his position as the batting coach at the Pakistan National Cricket Academy (NCA) in Lahore. Although the Pakistan Cricket Board (PCB) had not officially announced the development at the time, Yousuf confirmed that his resignation had been accepted. Describing it as a personal decision, he declined to elaborate further.

== Controversy ==
In 2007, after initially signing a contract to join the Indian Cricket League, Yousuf refused due to pressure from the Pakistan Cricket Board as he would later face a ban by the board. In return the PCB promised to get him into the Indian Premier League; however, no team bid for him as he faced litigation from the ICL.

In 2008, he once again threatened to join the ICL after the PCB dropped him from their squad. A PCB official was quoted as saying, "We have banned all our cricketers who joined the ICL and if Yousuf also plays for the unauthorised league then he will have to face the same punishment. Yousuf is still our best Test batsman and has a future with the Pakistan team, but not if he joins the ICL." Yousuf decided to join the ICL again to play mid-way through the second season. The Pakistan Cricket Board reacted to the news by banning him from the national team. Yousaf's chances of returning to Pakistani cricket improved on 2 February 2009 when a Pakistani court suspended the ban on ICL players.

Pakistan Cricket Board recalled batsman Mohammad Yousuf to the squad for their July 2009 Test series in Sri Lanka. Yousuf ended his association with the unsanctioned Indian Cricket League (ICL) in early May, in the hope of earning a recall for his country. His decision to join the ICL was made because of differences with former captain Shoaib Malik, who had since been replaced by Younus Khan. In July 2009, on his first match after returning to Test Cricket since 2007, Yousuf scored a century to announce his return to cricket.

Yousuf informed the Pakistan Cricket Board that he would not be taking part in the Champions Trophy 2008 because it would coincide with the holy month of Ramadan.

He along with another former Indian Cricket League player Abdul Razzaq were awarded 'A' category mid-term central contracts by Pakistan Cricket Board after they left Indian Cricket League. A little over one year after being welcomed back by the PCB, Yousuf was made captain of the Test team for the tour of New Zealand after Younus Khan was allowed to take a break.

The Pakistan Cricket Board, on 10 March 2010, banned Yousuf and former captain, Younis Khan from playing for the national team indefinitely and imposed one-year bans on Shoaib Malik and Rana Naved-ul-Hasan. Despite receiving the ban Yousuf said that the series against South Africa in late 2010 could be a possibility. Pakistan then toured England in July 2010 and after losing the first test by 354 runs due to a weak batting line-up, the second innings total of 80 being the lowest total by Pakistan against England. Yousuf announced his return to International Cricket and was placed on the squad. He then required a visa which was granted but there was a concern that Yousuf could not come to England in time for that tour.

Yousuf captained his domestic team, the Lahore Lions, to victory in the 2010–11 Faysal Bank Twenty-20 Cup; the team defeated the Karachi Dolphins in the final. That was also the first time in five years that the trophy had gone to someone besides the Sialkot Stallions. Yousuf was given the award of fielder of the series. He did however injure his hamstring in training for the series against South Africa in October 2010. Chief Selector Mohsin Khan elected to withdraw Yousuf from the ODI and T20I squads but said that he should be ready to play in the Test match series. Yousuf's replacement in the limited-overs squad was Younis Khan, who had successfully reconciled with the Pakistan Cricket Board. He managed to regain his fitness and participated in the two-match Test series against South Africa. Also, he managed to regain his fitness quickly enough to participate in the final ODI of the five-match series. Yousuf wore a shirt which had his name written on in ink, which was against regulations. The match-referee called him and Yousuf stated that because he came for the test series he did not bring coloured clothing because he did not think that he would play. Subsequently, the ICC cleared him of any wrongdoing. Minutes before the toss in the first Test match, Yousuf picked up a groin injury. The injury took two weeks to heal and subsequently Yousuf missed the two-match Test series. Amid his recent spate of injuries, former Pakistan captain Moin Khan suggested that Yousuf should retire from ODIs and T20s and focus on Tests only due to age and consistent injuries.

In January 2012 it was announced that Yousuf was holding talks with Leicestershire over becoming their overseas player for 2012. Talks broke down over Yousuf wanting to take time off for Ramadan. Yousaf received the Pride of Performance award in August 2012.

== Records ==
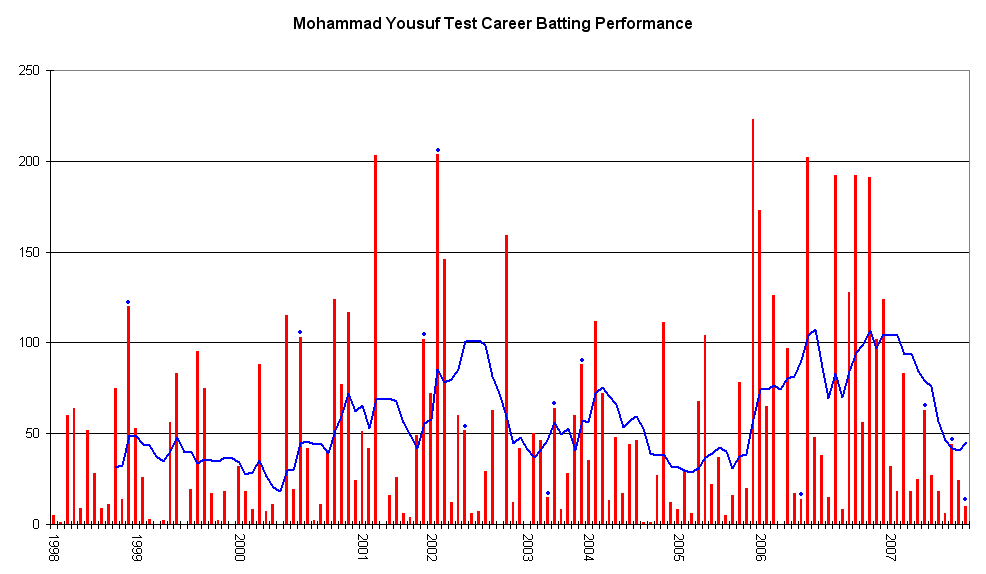
An innings-by-innings breakdown of Yousuf's Test match batting career as of 16 December 2007, showing runs scored (red bars) and the average of the last ten innings (blue line).

- Yousuf was the third Pakistani batsmen to surpass 6,000 runs in Test cricket, following Javed Miandad and Inzamam-ul-Haq.
- His 24 Test Match centuries is the third most for Pakistan, behind Inzamam-ul-Haq and Younus Khan.
- With his twin hundreds in the Karachi test against West Indies 2006, Mohammad Yousuf became the sixth Pakistani and 30th cricketer in Test cricket to hit a century in each innings of a Test match.
- He is the third highest run scorer in One-Day Internationals amongst Pakistani batsmen. His average of 44.50 places second out of all Pakistani batsmen, following only Zaheer Abbas (47.62).
- His Test average of 54.86 currently puts him in 10th spot for Test batting averages for players with more than 50 appearances.
- He has scored a century at International level against all Test playing nations, and also on the shores of all test nations.
- He was the third player in ODI history and first from Pakistan to score an ODI hundred in his 100th ODI.
- He is the current holder of the record for the highest number of runs scored in test cricket in a single calendar year. His total of 1799 runs was achieved in 2006 from 11 Test matches from 19 innings with one not out score.

== International centuries ==
Mohammad Yousuf scored 24 Test centuries and 15 ODI centuries.

== Awards and recognition ==
Yousuf won the Test Player of the Year at the ICC Awards in 2007.

In 2011, he was decorated by the President of Pakistan with the Sitara-i-Imtiaz, the third highest honour bestowed by Pakistan.

In November 2026, Pakistan Cricket Board added Yousuf to its Hall of Fame 2025 for his exceptional performances and contributions to cricket in Pakistan.

Preceded by Younis Khan	Pakistani national cricket captain 2009–2010	Succeeded by Shahid Afridi
