= Imad Wasim =

Pakistani cricketer

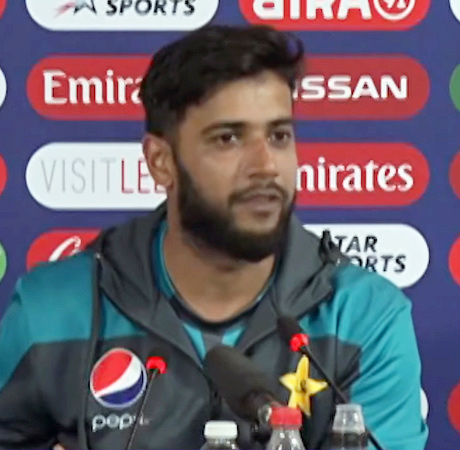
- Wasim in 2019

Personal information
- Full name: Syed Imad Wasim
- Born: 18 December 1988 (age 37); Swansea, Wales
- Height: 1.86 m (6 ft 1 in)
- Batting: Left-handed
- Bowling: Slow left-arm orthodox
- Role: All-rounder
- Relatives: Sannia Ashfaq (m.2019-2025)

International information
- National side: Pakistan (2015–2024)
- ODI debut (cap 204): 19 July 2015 v Sri Lanka
- Last ODI: 1 November 2020 v Zimbabwe
- ODI shirt no.: 9
- T20I debut (cap 62): 24 May 2015 v Zimbabwe
- Last T20I: 16 June 2024 v Ireland
- T20I shirt no.: 9

Domestic team information
- Years: Team
- 2005/06–2018/19 (Note: Not every team Imad has played for is shown in this list): Islamabad
- 2016–2023: Karachi Kings
- 2016–2023: Jamaica Tallawahs
- 2019–2023: Nottinghamshire
- 2019–2022: Northern
- 2023: Sylhet Strikers
- 2023–2024: Trent Rockets
- 2023/24: Melbourne Stars
- 2024-2025: Islamabad United
- 2024–2025: Antigua & Barbuda Falcons
- 2025: Glamorgan
- 2025: Northern Superchargers
- 2025/26: Dhaka Capitals

Career statistics
Competition	ODI	T20I	FC	LA
Matches	55	75	77	124
Runs scored	986	554	3702	2659
Batting average	42.86	15.82	40.68	36.93
100s/50s	0/5	0/1	6/20	2/16
Top score	63*	64*	207	117*
Balls bowled	2403	1536	8412	5902
Wickets	44	73	141	130
Bowling average	44.47	21.75	31.14	35.9
5 wickets in innings	1	1	3	1
10 wickets in match	0	0	1	0
Best bowling	5/14	5/14	8/81	5/14
Catches/stumpings	12/–	22/–	35/–	33/–
- Source: ESPNcricinfo, 28 June 2024

Syed Imad Wasim Haider (Urdu: سید عماد وسیم حیدر; born 18 December 1988), commonly known as Imad Wasim, is a Pakistani cricketer who played for Pakistan national cricket team from 2015 to 2024. He is a left-handed all-rounder. Imad is considered a Twenty20 specialist and played for many franchises around the world. He was a key member of the Pakistan team that won the 2017 ICC Champions Trophy.

In August 2018, he was one of thirty-three players to be awarded a central contract for the 2018–19 season by the Pakistan Cricket Board (PCB). In March 2019, he captained the Pakistan One Day International (ODI) team for the first time. On 24 November 2023, Imad announced his retirement from all forms of international cricket. But on 23 March 2024, he withdrew his retirement from International cricket for 2024 ICC Men's T20 World Cup. On 24 May 2024 Imad was named in Pakistan squad for 2024 ICC Men's T20 World Cup. He had the best Economy rate for Pakistan of 4.00 in 2024 ICC Men's T20 World Cup. He again announced his retirement from international cricket in December 2024.

== Early and personal life ==
Wasim was born in Swansea, Wales. His father briefly worked in England as an engineer. Wasim's parents moved to Pakistan when he was at a very early age, Wasim growing up in Islamabad, and he consequently played all first-class cricket there. He was studying medicine before his career in cricket, but quit when he got a chance to play for the under-19 Pakistan team.

In August 2019, Wasim married Sannia Ashfaq at the Shah Faisal Mosque in Islamabad.

The couple had their first child, a daughter, in 2021. Their second child, a son, was born in 2022.

Imad Wasim announced his remarriage to Nyla two months after filing for divorce from his first wife, Ashfaq, citing long-standing issues. He expressed regret for past decisions and emphasized his commitment to his children and privacy.

== International career ==
He made his Twenty20 International debut for Pakistan against Zimbabwe in Lahore on 24 May 2015. He made his One Day International debut for Pakistan against Sri Lanka on 19 July 2015. He was selected in the Pakistan squad for the 2016 ICC World Twenty20. Later in 2016, he became the 1st Pakistani spinner to take a 5-fer in T20Is as he recorded figures of 5/14 against the Windies. Wasim was a regular member of the winning Pakistan team in the 2017 ICC Champions Trophy. He also won Pakistan's T20I Player of the Year award in 2017 as he finished the year top of the ICC T20I bowling rankings.

In March 2019, Wasim was named in Pakistan's ODI squad for their series against Australia. Pakistan's captain Shoaib Malik was ruled out of the fourth ODI due to injury, with Wasim named as captain of the team in his place.

The following month, he was named in Pakistan's squad for the 2019 Cricket World Cup. He had a great tournament with both the ball and the bat as he scored 162 runs in 5 innings at an average of 54.00 and a healthy strike rate of 118.24 as well as chipping in with 2 wickets with an economy rate of 4.82 which was better than any Pakistani at the tournament.

As of April 2020, he is ranked third in the International Cricket Council's One Day International all-rounder rankings and seventh in the Twenty20 International bowling rankings.

In June 2020, he was named in a 29-man squad for Pakistan's tour to England during the COVID-19 pandemic. In September 2021, he was named in Pakistan's squad for the 2021 ICC Men's T20 World Cup.

In May 2024, he was named in Pakistan's squad for the 2024 ICC Men's T20 World Cup tournament.

On March 23, 2024, Wasim reversed his previous retirement from international cricket. This decision came after meeting with the PCB officials regarding his return to the national team for the T20 World Cup scheduled for June 2024. The decision is also due to his PSL 9 form in the later half of tournament that helped Islamabad United to lift the title for the third time.

On 13 December 2024, Imad announced retirement from international cricket for the second time.

== Twenty20 franchise career ==
Wasim is considered a Twenty20 specialist.

In 2016 Karachi Kings picked him in the draft. In 2017 Karachi Kings announced Imad as the new captain, but in 2022 they made Babar Azam the new captain. In 2023, Wasim was named as captain again. Imad had a great tournament with bat scoring 404 runs with SR of 170.46 in just 10 matches. In 2024, Karachi Kings released him in the exchange of Hasan Ali. Wasim joined Islamabad United as a mentor. He is the only bowler to take a fifer in a Pakistan Super League final.

In 2020 Melbourne Renegades signed Wasim for the Big Bash League. In 2021 Jamaica Tallawahs signed him for the Caribbean Premier League.

In 2022 Wasim was picked by Galle Gladiators for the 2022 Lanka Premier League.

In 2023 he was signed by Melbourne Stars. In 2024 he was signed by Abu Dhabi Knight Riders. On 20 March 2024 Wasim was drafted to Trent Rockets for the 2024 The Hundred.

In 2025 Wasim returned to Wales to play Vitality Blast cricket for Glamorgan.

== Television ==
Year	Show	Channel	Note
2018	With Samina Peerzada	YouTube	Web television talk show, guest for the season 1 on 9 April 2018
2022	Jeeto Pakistan League	ARY Digital	Game show, special guest for the season 3 on 10 April 2022
2022-2023	The Ultimate Muqabla	ARY Digital	Adventure-action reality show
