= Umar Akmal =

Pakistani cricketer

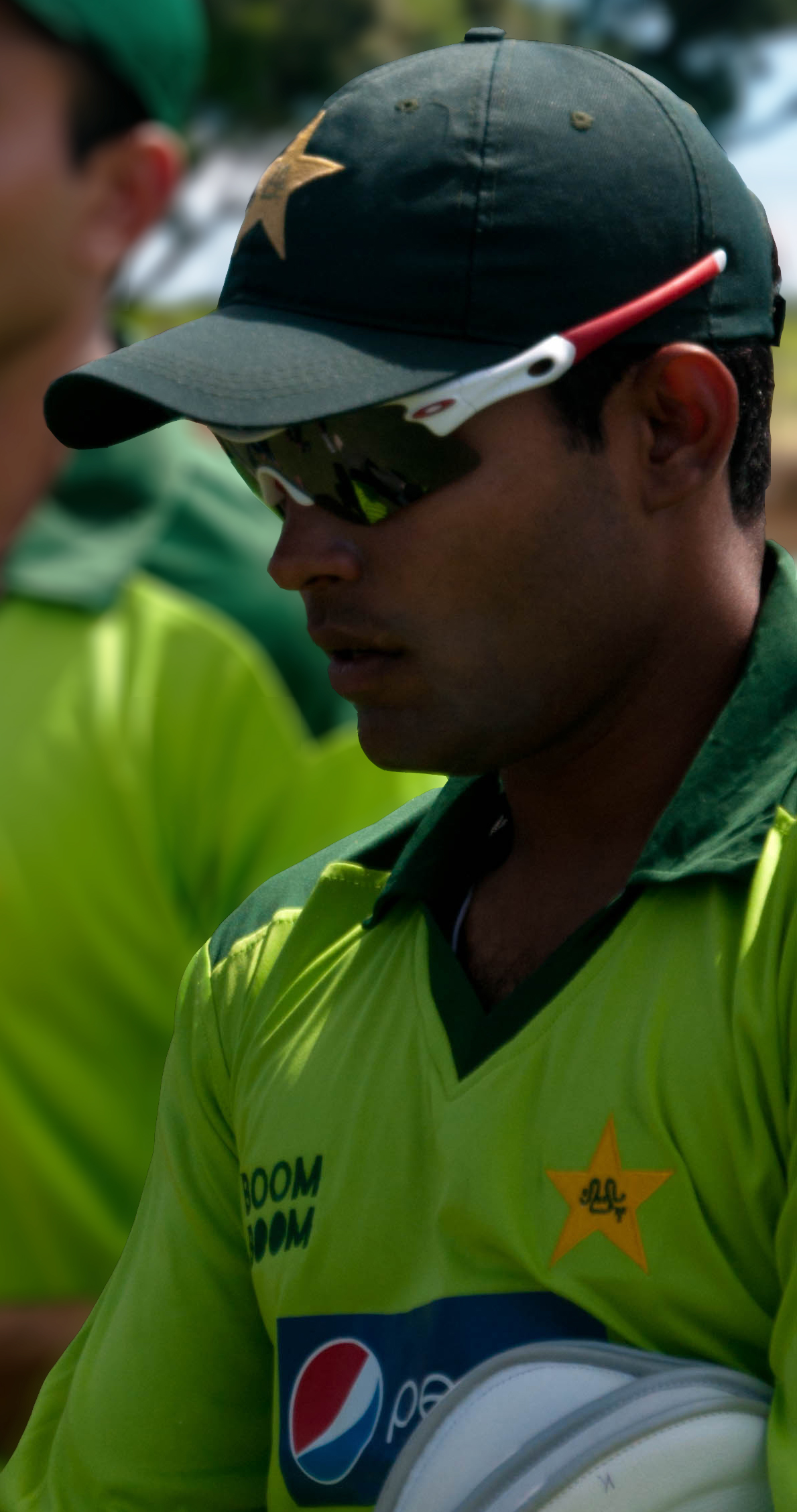
- Akmal in New Zealand in December 2009

Personal information
- Full name: Umar Akmal
- Born: 26 May 1990 (age 36); Lahore, Punjab, Pakistan
- Batting: Right-handed
- Bowling: Right-arm off spin
- Role: Middle-order batsman
- Relatives: Adnan Akmal (brother); Kamran Akmal (brother); Babar Azam (cousin); Abdul Qadir (father-in-law); Usman Qadir (brother-in-law); Sulaman Qadir (brother-in-law)

International information
- National side: Pakistan (2009–2019)
- Test debut (cap 197): 24 November 2009 v New Zealand
- Last Test: 1 September 2011 v Zimbabwe
- ODI debut (cap 174): 1 August 2009 v Sri Lanka
- Last ODI: 31 March 2019 v Australia
- ODI shirt no.: 96
- T20I debut (cap 34): 12 August 2009 v Sri Lanka
- Last T20I: 7 October 2019 v Sri Lanka

Domestic team information
- Years: Team
- 2007–2017: Sui Northern Gas Pipelines
- 2008–2015: Lahore Lions
- 2012: Wayamba United
- 2013: Barbados Tridents
- 2015: Guyana Amazon Warriors
- 2015: Chittagong Vikings
- 2015–2016: Leicestershire
- 2016: Rajshahi Kings
- 2016–2018: Lahore Qalandars (squad no. 96)
- 2016: Trinbago Knight Riders (squad no. 96)
- 2016, 2019: Balochistan
- 2017: Punjab
- 2017/18: United Bank Limited
- 2018: Khyber Pakhtunkhwa
- 2018–2019: Habib Bank Limited
- 2019–2022: Quetta Gladiators (squad no. 96)
- 2019–2020: Central Punjab

Career statistics
Competition	Test	ODI	T20I	FC
Matches	16	121	84	107
Runs scored	1,003	3,194	1,690	7,537
Batting average	35.82	34.34	26.00	43.81
100s/50s	1/6	2/20	0/8	17/41
Top score	129	102*	94	248
Catches/stumpings	12/–	77/13	50/2	86/0
- Source: ESPN Cricinfo, 12 September 2022

Umar Akmal (Urdu, Punjabi: عمر اکمل; born 26 May 1990) is a Pakistani cricketer who played for Pakistan national cricket team between 2009 and 2019. He was banned by the Pakistan Cricket Board for eighteen months for not disclosing offers related to spot fixing until August 2021.

Akmal made his One Day International (ODI) debut on 1 August 2009 against Sri Lanka, his Twenty20 International (T20I) debut on 12 August 2009 also against Sri Lanka, and his Test debut against New Zealand on 23 November 2009. He is a right-handed batsman and a part-time spinner. Like his two brothers, Adnan and Kamran, Umar has kept wicket for the national team in many ODIs.

Domestically, he played for Sui Northern Gas Pipelines Limited for eleven years, before signing with United Bank Limited in August 2017. He has also played in many franchise Twenty20 teams around the world.

In February 2020, he was suspended by the Pakistan Cricket Board (PCB), after he had breached their Anti-Corruption code. In April 2020, the PCB banned him from cricket for three years, after he pled guilty to failing to report corrupt approaches. The following month, he lodged an appeal against his ban. In July 2020, Akmal's ban was reduced to one-and-a-half years, with his suspension running from February 2020 to August 2021. In August 2020, the PCB appealed the ban reduction to the Court of Arbitration for Sport (CAS) and Akmal appealed to the CAS to have his ban overturned. In February 2021, the CAS reduced the ban to 12 months and imposed a PKR 4.25 million (27,000 USD) fine on Akmal.

In July 2021, Akmal apologised for not reporting corrupt approaches last year, which led to him being banned for 12 months. He then left Pakistan to sign a short-term contract with the Northern California Cricket Association in the United States.

== Early and personal life ==
He was born to Mohammad Akmal Siddique, "a very senior administrator in Pakistan cricket", in a family of eight children, with seven sons who all played cricket at some point but many went to business, and one daughter. He is the youngest brother of Adnan Akmal and Kamran Akmal who are also cricketers, both wicket-keepers. He is also the cousin of Pakistani batsman Babar Azam.

In 2014 he married Noor Amna, the daughter of Pakistan leg-spinner Abdul Qadir.

== Early career and domestic career ==
Akmal represented Pakistan in the 2008 U/19 Cricket World Cup in Malaysia. After his success at the U-19 level he earned himself a first-class contract and played the 2007–08 season of the Quaid-e-Azam Trophy, representing the Sui Northern Gas team.

He is an aggressive style cricketer. In only his sixth first-class match he scored 248 off just 225 deliveries, including four sixes. He followed that up with an unbeaten 186 in his 8th first-class match, off just 170 balls. He fared less well in his second season of first-class cricket, with a string of low scores batting at number 3.

He found form in the final few matches of the 2008/09 season and then in the RBS T20 tournament which led to him getting selected to play for Pakistan A side on their tour to Australia A.

Akmal came to prominence during the Australia A tour in June/July 2009. In the two unofficial Test matches he recorded scores of 54, 100*, 130, 0. In the unofficial ODI series that followed, Akmal continued his fine form with a century in the opening ODI encounter off just 68 deliveries. These performances made him gather considerable praise from the media who were there to witness him and calls began to grow about his inclusion in the ODI series for the main Pakistan side against Sri Lanka. Later that year, Akmal made his Test, ODI, and T20I debut.

He played for Sui Northern Gas in the Quaid-e-Azam trophy until 2016–17, during which time Sui Northern Gas won three times (2007-08, 2014-15, 2015-16). However, he was briefly dropped from the first-class side for the 2012 President's Trophy. Akmal played for United Bank Limited in 2017–18, and for Habib Bank Limited in 2018-19 and won the 2018–19 Quaid-e-Azam Trophy with Habib Bank Limited.

Akmal played for the Lahore Lions in the National T20 Cup until 2015–16, during which time Lahore Lions won the tournament three times (2010-11, 2012-13, 2013-14).

Akmal played for Balochistan in the 2016 Pakistan Cup. He captained Punjab in the 2017 Pakistan Cup, with Punjab finishing 4th out of 5th.

In April 2018, he was named in Khyber Pakhtunkhwa's squad for the 2018 Pakistan Cup. He was the leading run-scorer for Habib Bank Limited in the 2018–19 Quaid-e-Azam One Day Cup, with 410 runs in ten matches. In March 2019, he was named in Baluchistan's squad for the 2019 Pakistan Cup. In the opening match of the tournament, he scored 136 not out, his highest total in List A cricket. He was the leading run-scorer in the tournament, with 342 runs in five matches.

In September 2019, he was named in Central Punjab's squad for the 2019–20 Quaid-e-Azam Trophy tournament. Central Punjab won the tournament and Akmal was named man of the match in the final.

== Test career ==
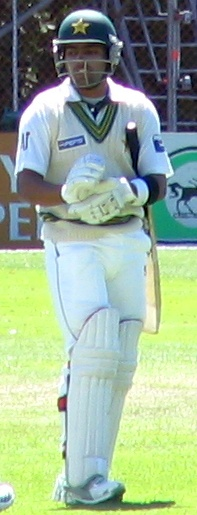
Umar Akmal at the University Oval, Dunedin, in 2009.

Akmal made his Test debut against New Zealand at Dunedin on 23 November 2009. On the third day of his debut Test, Akmal hit 129 runs from 160 balls becoming only the second Pakistani to score a hundred on debut away from home after Fawad Alam.

This feat also made him the first Pakistani batsman to score both his maiden Test and ODI century away from home, following his ODI century against Sri Lanka. The innings was noted as special due to Pakistan's tough position in the match and the hundred partnership which Akmal was involved in alongside his elder brother Kamran. He followed up the century in the first innings with a fifty in the second innings.

In only his second Test match he was moved up the order to the crucial spot of number 3, where he struggled initially but managed to counter-attack making 46 runs before he was undone by an inswinger by Daryl Tuffey. In the second innings he was moved down the order to his usual batting spot of number 5 as captain Mohammed Yousuf chose to bat at number 3 himself, and Akmal looked his usual aggressive self throughout his innings of 52 runs which came off only 33 balls.

He had his first failure in the first innings of the third Test at Napier where he was caught in the gully for a duck but scored a rearguard 77 in the second, promoting him to the leading run scorer of the series. Akmal finished the tour with 379 runs at an average of 63.16.

Akmal played his last Test match in the one-off test against Zimbabwe in 2011. Akmal scored only 15 in that match and was dropped from the Test team thereafter and has yet to be recalled.

== ODI and Twenty20 career ==
In an interview, Akmal said "My own dream is to one day play for Pakistan alongside Kamran Bhai (Akmal's brother) and I'm working hard to try and achieve that goal". Akmal was selected in Pakistan's squad for the One Day International Series against Sri Lanka in July–August 2009.

After not playing in the first ODI, Akmal made his debut in the second match of the series replacing Mohammad Yousuf in the middle order. In only his second career ODI, Akmal scored his maiden ODI fifty. He followed up his maiden fifty by scoring a century in the very next match. For this match winning effort he was awarded his career's first Man of the Match award. His exploits in Sri Lanka earned him a place in the Pakistan squad for the 2009 ICC Champions Trophy.

His 41 not out against West Indies was a match winning knock and landed him his second career Man of the Match award. His next big innings came in the semi-final against New Zealand, where he scored a brisk 55 in a losing effort, before he was wrongly given out by umpire Simon Taufel, who later apologized.

Despite the fact that Akmal is not a wicket-keeper he kept wicket for Pakistan temporarily in the third ODI against England in 2010 from the 27th over onwards because his elder brother Kamran was being diagnosed for an injury to his finger. Umar Akmal scored 71 runs from 52 balls in his debut World Cup match and was named Man of the Match.

In February 2012, Pakistan faced England in four ODIs. Pakistan's brittle batting meant the team management chose to play Akmal as a wicket-keeper based on his batting, though his brother Adnan was considered the better 'keeper'. The result of choosing the less accomplished glovesman was that in the first two matches Umar Akmal missed opportunities to dismiss Ravi Bopara and Alastair Cook early in their innings, and they respectively went on to score a half-century and a century.

Akmal was included in Pakistan's squad for the 2012 World Twenty20. Pakistan made it to the semifinal where they lost to Sri Lanka.

Akmal was dropped from ODI series against Sri Lanka in 2015, but called up for the T20I series. He proved his value to the team, by scoring 24-ball 46 runs in the first T20I match.

Akmal was initially suspended from Pakistan's T20I series against England for attending a party without PCB permission, but was subsequently cleared of wrongdoing and allowed to go on tour. Akmal scored only 26 runs across 3 innings in that series.

Akmal was initially suspended from Pakistan's first T20I against New Zealand due to an incident in the final of the recently concluded Quaid-e-Azam trophy. However, the suspension was lifted on appeal. Akmal was the highest run scorer of the T20 series for the Pakistanis with 85 runs across three innings with one fifty.

Akmal played in the 2016 World Twenty20. Akmal was dropped from the T20 side afterwards. He was also dropped from a training camp afterwards for disciplinary issues.

Akmal was recalled to the T20 side for the series against West Indies. He played one game with a high score of 1*.

Akmal was dropped from the ODI side for the series against West Indies due to fitness issues. He was later recalled and included in the ODI squad for the 2017 ICC Champions Trophy only to fail a fitness test shortly before the tournament. Akmal was subsequently sent back and was replaced by Haris Sohail.

Akmal was dropped from PCB's list of centrally contracted players on 12 July 2017 due to persistent fitness issues.

In March 2019, Akmal was recalled to the ODI squad for their series against Australia in the UAE. He scored 150 runs across 5 innings at an average of 30 and failed to cross 50 in the entire series. In addition, he was fined 20% of his match fee for breaking team curfew ahead of the 5th ODI.

Akmal was not picked for the 2019 Cricket World Cup squad.

In October 2019, Umar Akmal was recalled to the T20 side for Pakistan's home series against Sri Lanka. However, he scored two golden ducks in the first two games of the series and was subsequently dropped. As a result, he equalled Tillekaratne Dilshan's unwanted record for scoring the most ducks in T20Is with 10. Umar Akmal has the record for scoring the second most ducks in Twenty 20 cricket history (27) just behind Dwayne Smith.

== T20 franchise career ==
=== Pakistan Super League ===
Akmal was bought by Lahore Qalandars for US$140,000 in 2016 season. He performed well and ended up as the highest runs-scorer in PSL 2016 scoring 335 runs in seven innings with four half-centuries. His team didn't qualify for play-offs and finished last in the group stage. He was retained by Lahore Qalandars for 2nd season. He finished the season with 164 runs from 8 matches with only one fifty. He was again retained by Qalandars for 3rd season. He was eventually dropped by Lahore Qalandars for later part of the tournament for his below par performance and disciplinary issues.

Akmal joined Quetta Gladiators for 4th season as a result of a trade. He scored 277 runs in 12 matches in the tournament.

Umar was originally part of the Quetta Gladiators squad for the 2020 season, but was removed a day before the tournament after he was suspended by PCB with immediate effect under Article 4.7.1 of its anti-corruption code, disallowing him from taking part in any cricket-related activity under the board's purview, "pending the investigation being carried out by PCB's Anti-Corruption Unit". He was replaced by Anwar Ali.

=== Caribbean Premier League ===
Akmal played for three seasons. He played for the Barbados Tridents in 2013, Guyana Amazon Warriors in 2015, and the Trinbago Knight Riders in 2016.

While he was playing for the Barbados Tridents, in the Caribbean Premier League, he had to spend a night in hospital after he suffered mild seizures. Following this, the PCB called him back for a complete medical checkup and also dropped him from the upcoming Zimbabwe tour. On 6 September 2013, he was cleared by a neurologist, saying that the seizure was possibly due to a lack of sleep.

=== Other leagues ===
Akmal played for Wayamba United in the 2012 season of the Sri Lankan Premier League (SLPL). Akmal played two games and scored 13 runs. However, Akmal would not play another season as the SLPL folded that year.

Akmal was picked for the Sydney Sixers for the 2012-13 Big Bash but did not play a game.

Akmal spent two seasons in the Bangladesh Premier League. He played for Chittagong Vikings in the 2015-16 season. The Chittagong Vikings finished bottom of the group that season. Akmal played for the Rajshahi Kings in the 2016-17 season. He played nine games and scored 106 runs at an average of 13.25.

Akmal spent two seasons (2015 and 2016) in the T20 Blast. He played for the Leicestershire Foxes in both seasons. In 2015, he played 4 games and scored 133 runs at an average of 133 with two fifties and a high score of 76*. However, he fared worse in 2016. He played 6 games and scored 134 runs at an average of 33.5 with one 50.

In June 2019, he was selected to play for the Winnipeg Hawks franchise team in the 2019 Global T20 Canada tournament.

== Ban for corruption ==
On 20 February 2020, Akmal was provisionally suspended by PCB with immediate effect under Article 4.7.1 of its anti-corruption code, disallowing him from taking part in any cricket-related activity under the board's purview, "pending the investigation being carried out by PCB's Anti-Corruption Unit". This prevented Akmal from playing in that season's Pakistan Super League. On 20 March, the PCB formally charged Akmal with two breaches of its anti-corruption code for two unrelated incidents. The charges were laid under article 2.4.4 of PCB's anti-corruption code which deals with "Failing to disclose to the PCB Vigilance and Security Department (without unnecessary delay) full details of any approaches or invitations received by the participant to engage in corrupt conduct under this Anti-Corruption Code". Akmal decided not to contest the charge, forgoing his right to a hearing in front of the PCB's Anti-corruption Tribunal, and instead his case went directly to the disciplinary committee, chaired by Retired Justice Fazal-e-Miran Chauhan. At the disciplinary hearing held on 27 April, Akmal appeared without a lawyer and did not plead guilty. Akmal admitted to being approached by two different men on separate occasions but tried to justify why he did not report these approaches to the PCB. At the end of the hearing, the PCB banned Akmal from all representative cricket for 3 years, with the ban to last until 19 February 2023. It was thought that his 3-year ban, which was longer than his fellow countryman Mohammad Irfan (12 month ban with 6 months suspended) for a similar offense, was due to a lack of remorse on Akmal's part. The following month, he lodged an appeal against his ban. In July 2020, Akmal's ban was reduced to one-and-a-half years, with his suspension running from February 2020 to August 2021. In August 2020, the PCB appealed the ban reduction to the Court of Arbitration for Sport (CAS) and Akmal appealed to the CAS to have his ban overturned. On 26 February, the CAS reduced Akmal's ban to 12 months, meaning that Akmal can immediately return to playing cricket, subject to first completing a rehabilitation program under the PCB's anti-corruption code. In addition, the CAS imposed a fine of PKR 4.25 million (27,000 USD).

== Controversies ==
In addition to ban for corruption, Akmal has been involved in several on and off field incidents throughout his international and professional career.

In the final Test match of Pakistan's 2009–10 tour of Australia, Akmal allegedly feigned an injury to protest the dropping of older brother Kamran. Umar denied such rumors and played in the final match without his brother. Pakistan went on to lose that match by 231 runs and lost the three match series 3–0, with Akmal registering scores of only 8 and 15 in the match. He was later fined 2 million Pakistani rupees and put on probation by the PCB for breaching his contract and speaking to the media without approval.

Akmal's name initially popped up in investigations surrounding the Pakistan cricket spot-fixing scandal. His name was mentioned by bookmaker Mazhar Majeed as someone who he was working with. However, no evidence was unearthed that Akmal had accepted any money in exchange for spot-fixing.

In Pakistan's semifinal loss against Sri Lanka in the 2012 ICC World Twenty20, Akmal was fined 50% of his match fee. In the 17th over of the second innings and with Akmal at the non-striker's end, Akmal called for a change of gloves despite instructions from umpires Simon Taufel and Rod Tucker to the contrary. Akmal ignored the umpires and changed his gloves regardless. After the match, Akmal pled guilty and match referee Jeff Crowe handed a level 2 charge and a fine of 50% of match fees, with Crowe noting "Umar showed blatant disregard to both the umpires' requests, which was offensive and unacceptable from an international cricketer and contrary to our unique spirit".

On 1 February 2014, Akmal was arrested by Gulberg Police in Lahore for allegedly not stopping at a traffic signal and subsequently getting into a physical altercation with the traffic warden which resulted in the warden's uniform being torn. Akmal was booked under Section 186, 279 and 353 of the Pakistan Penal Code and a First Information Report (FIR) for "obstructing public servant in discharge of public functions, rash driving or riding on a public way and assault or criminal force to deter public servant from discharge of his duty". Akmal denied the claims and implied that he was physically attacked by the warden. Akmal was released on bail after 12 hours of police detention.

On 16 April 2014, four people were arrested at a party that celebrated Akmal's marriage to Noor Amma, the daughter of Pakistan leg-spinner Abdul Qadir, for violating local by-laws that were in place to curb excessively lavish wedding parties.

On 12 November 2015, Akmal was dropped from Pakistan's T20 side for their series against England for "bringing the PCB and Pakistan Cricket into disrepute." It was reported that Akmal had attended a party while playing for Sui Northern Gas Pipelines Limited in their Quaid-e-Azam Trophy match against Hyderabad without the PCB's permission. Local newspaper Daily Kawish Sindhi had reported that some cricketers allegedly were engaging in "immoral activity" at the party. In Akmal's place, Rafatullah Mohmand was called up. Akmal was later reinstated after an investigation by the PCB into the activities at the party.

During the final of the 2015–16 Quaid-e-Azam Trophy on 3–6 January 2016, Akmal reportedly wore a uniform that sported a different logo to that of his teammates. This constituted a charge of committing "abuse of cricket equipment or clothing, ground equipment or fixtures and fittings during a match" which is a Level 1 charge of the PCB's code of conduct. As this was Akmal's third such offense, the PCB banned Akmal for one match, which ruled Akmal out of Pakistan's first T20 during their tour of New Zealand. However, Akmal was allowed to play after the ban was lifted on appeal.

On 26 April 2016, it was reported that Akmal was involved in a brawl at a local theater in Faisalabad. Allegedly Akmal had requested that a song be replayed, but the theater administration denied the request at which point Akmal got into an argument and was ushered outside. Akmal was cleared by the PCB the next day.

On 17 May 2017, the PCB fined Akmal and teammate Junaid Khan 50% of match fees as well as being put on one month probation in relation to an incident that occurred during a Pakistan Cup match against Sindh on 27 April 2017. Akmal, who was captaining Punjab at the time, made comments at the coin toss explaining Junaid Khan's absence from that game, implying that Khan had simply decided not to show up. Later in the day, Khan rebutted the comments in the form of a video shot from his hotel room in which he stated that he was "saddened to hear the remarks Akmal made on television, saying 'I ran away from the team'... I am dealing with a case of food poisoning and the team management is aware of that... Umar Akmal knew of this..."

On 16 August 2017, about one month after losing his central contract due to persistent fitness issues, Akmal held an impromptu press conference in which he criticized then Pakistan national team coach Mickey Arthur. It was reported that Akmal had tried to enter the National Cricket Academy (NCA) to work on his fitness, but none of the coaches wanted to work with Akmal since NCA coaches only work with PCB's centrally contracted players. Akmal then took up this issue with the chief selector at the time Inzamam-ul-Haq who then redirected Akmal to Mickey Arthur. It was at this point that Akmal claimed that Arthur used "abusive language" towards Akmal. In a separate statement to the media, Arthur confirmed that an exchange occurred between himself and Akmal but denied using abusive language, instead saying that "he had to earn the right to use our support staff because he is not a contracted cricketer. He can't just walk in here and demand what he wants." The PCB issued a show-cause notice to Umar Akmal and formed a committee to investigate the situation. On 28 September, the PCB fined Akmal 1 million rupees, banned Akmal for 3 matches, and revoked Akmal's No-Objection Certificates (NOC) for the next two months. The revocation of Akmal's NOCs meant that Akmal was ruled out of all but the last two weeks of the Bangladesh Premier League.

On 24 June 2018, Akmal gave an interview with Samaa TV in which he revealed offers to spot-fix during the 2015 World Cup. Akmal reported that he was offered US$200,000 to "leave two balls alone" but Akmal denied accepting the offer. The PCB issued a show-cause notice and asked Akmal to come before anti-corruption unit on 27 June to explain his comments. The International Cricket Council (ICC) also began conducting its own investigations into the matter.

On 1 April 2019, Akmal was fined 20% of his match fee for breaking team curfew ahead of the 5th and final ODI of Pakistan's ODI series against Australia. Akmal headed out to watch an Akon concert on the night of 29 March without getting permission from team management.

On 2 February 2020, it was reported that Umar Akmal exposed himself to a staff member of the NCA while undergoing a fitness test. While undergoing a skin-fold test to measure body fat, Akmal undressed completely in front of the staff member and asked, "Where is the fat?" In response to this incident, the PCB initiated an inquiry that lasted two days. At the end of the inquiry, the PCB decided against handing any punishment, and instead "reminded him of his responsibilities as a senior cricketer".
