= 2012–13 National T20 Cup =

Cricket tournament

- Dates: 1 – 9 December 2012
- Administrator: Pakistan Cricket Board
- Cricket format: Twenty20
- Tournament format(s): Round Robin and Knockout Stage
- Host: Lahore
- Champions: Lahore Lions (2nd title)
- Participants: 14
- Matches: 45
- Most runs: Ahmed Shehzad (391)
- Most wickets: Asad Ali (15)

The 2012–13 Faysal Bank T20 Cup was the ninth season of the Faysal Bank T20 Cup in Pakistan, which was held from 1 to 9 December 2012. The winning team received Rs 20 million as prize money while the runners-up received Rs 10 million. This was also the last edition of the tournament, which was replaced with the Pakistan Super League.

== News ==
- 15 November: Pakistan Cricket Board denied Umar Akmal, Saeed Ajmal and Shahid Afridi permission to play in the season's Big Bash League, the Australia Twenty20 league, to ensure the trio's participation in Faysal Bank T20 Cup.
- 17 November: Shahid Afridi is a fine player and has performed well in the past, but the upcoming Faysal Bank T20 Cup is the opportunity for him to perform and we will watch him – Pakistan chief selector Iqbal Qasim.
- 19 November: Pakistan Cricket Board granted Saeed Ajmal, Shahid Afridi and Umar Akmal permission to play a few games at the Big Bash League, on the request of Cricket Australia. The trio were to miss the last round of Faysal Bank T20 Cup.
- 19 November: Shahid Afridi, the Pakistan allrounder, has said he will not play for Sydney Thunder despite being given permission by Pakistan Cricket Board to take part in Australia's Big Bash League. Afridi said he wanted to play in Faysal Bank T20 Cup instead and that clashes with Australia's Twenty20 competition.
- 20 November: Famous all-rounder Azhar Mahmood now will lead Islamabad Leopards in order to get a position in the national team of Pakistan for the tour of India. Azhar Mahmood had not played in any league of Pakistan since October 2010. He had played in many T20 leagues all over the world like the Indian Premier League, Bangladesh Premier League, Friends Life t20, HRV Cup, Sri Lanka Premier League and Champions League Twenty20.
- 21 November: Test cricketer Hasan Raza was debarred from leading Karachi Zebras for the domestic season, but he could represent his team as the inquiry committee which took the decision failed to find any substance in the allegations of match-fixing against him and his team Karachi Zebras during the 2012 Faysal Bank Super Eight T20 Cup. Danish Kaneria was also not able to lead Karachi Zebras this year due to his spot fixing ban. Rameez Raja is mostly confident for captaining the team Karachi Zebras.
- 21 November: Lahore Regional Cricket Association named Mohammad Yousuf as the Lahore Lions captain and also requested Pakistan Cricket Board to review its one-year ban on left-arm fast-bowler Emmad Ali so that he could be possibly be included in the T20 squads. Pakistan's T20 captain Mohammad Hafeez will be featuring in the Lahore Lions instead of Faisalabad Wolves.
- 24 November: Pakistan Cricket Board (PCB) has decided to set arena for Pakistan's domestic Twenty20 tournament in Lahore instead of Karachi because of the volatile situation in city which was scheduled to be played between 2 and 10 December. The tournament will now be played in three different grounds of Lahore which includes Gaddafi Stadium, Bagh-e-Jinnah and Lahore City Cricket Association Ground.
- 28 November: The Faysal Bank T20 Cup will begin on 1 December and its final will be on 9 December. Bahawalpur Stags is the new team in the T20 competition.
- 30 November: Pakistan Cricket Board is introducing in-competition dope testing during the Faysal Bank T20 Cup in order to strive for drug-free sports and to protect the basic framework for the athletes, the board said in a statement. Cricketers from all the regional teams participating in Faysal Bank T20 Cup will randomly be picked for dope testing. "These tests will be conducted by WADA-accredited independent doping control officers throughout the competition."
- 1 December: Mohammad Yousuf, the former Pakistan batsman, has passed on the captaincy of the Lahore Lions team to Mohammad Hafeez, the national team's T20 captain, for the ongoing Faysal Bank T20 Cup to help the latter gain experience.

== Teams ==
Group A
Abbottabad Falcons
Captain	Younis Khan
City	Abbottabad
Coach	Sajjad Akbar
Islamabad Leopards
Captain	Umar Gul
City	Islamabad
Coach	Taimoor Azam
Karachi Zebras
Captain	Rameez Raja
City	Karachi
Coach	Azam Khan
Lahore Lions
Captain	Mohammad Hafeez
City	Lahore
Coach	Mohsin Kamal
Multan Tigers
Captain	Abdur Rauf
City	Multan
Coach	Wasim Haider
Quetta Bears
Captain	Gohar Faiz
City	Quetta
Coach	Arshad Khan
Sialkot Stallions
Captain	Shoaib Malik
City	Sialkot
Coach	Ijaz Ahmed jnr

Group B
Bahawalpur Stags
Captain	Bilal Khilji
City	Bahawalpur
Coach	Shahid Anwar
Faisalabad Wolves
Captain	Misbah-ul-Haq
City	Faisalabad
Coach	Naved Anjum
Hyderabad Hawks
Captain	Rizwan Ahmed
City	Hyderabad
Coach	Shaukat Mirza
Karachi Dolphins
Captain	Shahid Afridi
City	Karachi
Coach	Tauseef Ahmed
Lahore Eagles
Captain	Taufeeq Umar
City	Lahore
Coach	Manzoor Elahi
Peshawar Panthers
Captain	Akbar Badshah
City	Peshawar
Coach	Abdur Rehman (cricketer)
Rawalpindi Rams
Captain	Sohail Tanvir
City	Rawalpindi
Coach	Sabih Azhar

== Venues ==
Lahore
Bagh-e-Jinnah	Gaddafi Stadium	LCCA Ground
Bagh-e-Jinnah	Gaddafi Stadium	
Matches: 14	Matches: 17	Matches: 14

Venues in Pakistan

== Fixtures and results ==
All times shown are in Pakistan Standard Time (UTC+05).

=== Group stage ===
==== Group A ====
Points Table

Team	Pld	W	L	NR	NRR	Pts
Lahore Lions	6	6	0	0	+1.433	12
Multan Tigers	6	4	2	0	+1.118	8
Sialkot Stallions	6	4	2	0	+0.992	8
Abbottabad Falcons	6	4	2	0	−0.399	8
Karachi Zebras	6	2	4	0	−0.333	4
Islamabad Leopards	6	1	5	0	−0.926	2
Quetta Bears	6	0	6	0	−1.744	0

1 December
12:00
Scorecard

Quetta Bears; 72 (17 overs)	v	Multan Tigers; 74/0 (11 overs)
Mohibullah 24 (14); Mohammad Irfan 3/8 (3 overs)		Zain Abbas 40* (34); Jalat Khan 0/13 (2 overs)

Multan Tigers won by 10 wickets.
Gaddafi Stadium, Lahore
Umpires: Majid Hussain and Raweed Khan
Player of the match: Mohammad Irfan (Multan Tigers)

- Multan Tigers won the toss and chose to field.
- Aamer Yamin and Rahat Ali from the Multan Tigers and Hamal Wahab, Shah Mureed and Umar Qasim from the Quetta Bears made their Twenty20 debut.

1 December
13:15
Scorecard

Islamabad Leopards; 122/9 (20 overs)	v	Sialkot Stallions; 128/2 (15.5 overs)
Bazid Khan 28 (22); Umaid Asif 3/21 (4 overs)		Imran Nazir 65 (43); Sajid Ali 1/25 (3 overs)

Sialkot Stallions won by 8 wickets
Bagh-e-Jinnah, Lahore
Umpires: Khalid Mahmood and Shozab Raza
Player of the match: Imran Nazir (Sialkot Stallions)

- Islamabad Leopards won the toss and chose to bat.

1 December
16:00 (D/N)
Scorecard

Karachi Zebras; 141/6 (20 overs)	v	Lahore Lions; 144/3 (18.1 overs)
Fahad Iqbal 59* (52); Aizaz Cheema 2/21 (4 overs)		Mohammad Hafeez 53 (43); Rumman Raees 1/15 (4 overs)

Lahore Lions won by 7 wickets
Gaddafi Stadium, Lahore
Umpires: Akmal Hayat and Nadeem Iqbal
Player of the match: Mohammad Hafeez (Lahore Lions)

- Karachi Zebras won the toss and chose to bat.

2 December
09:30
Scorecard

Lahore Lions; 186/4 (20 overs)	v	Abbottabad Falcons; 156/6 (20 overs)
Kamran Akmal 59 (33); Ahmed Jamal 2/37 (4 overs)		Younis Khan 47 (32); Mohammad Hafeez 4/25 (4 overs)

Lahore Lions won by 30 runs
Bagh-e-Jinnah, Lahore
Umpires: Aftab Gillani and Kamal Merchant
Player of the match: Kamran Akmal (Lahore Lions)

- Abbottabad Falcons won the toss and chose to field.
- Fazl-e-Rabbi, Rameez Ahmed and Sohail Akthar from the Abbottabad Falcons and Imam-ul-Haq from Lahore Lions made their Twenty20 debut.

2 December
09:30
Scorecard

Sialkot Stallions; 149/7 (20 overs)	v	Quetta Bears; 77 (17.5 overs)
Shoaib Malik 51 (33); Nazar Hussain 3/16 (3 overs)		Jalat Khan 17 (21); Shoaib Malik 4/13 (4 overs)

Sialkot Stallions won by 72 runs
Lahore City Cricket Association Ground, Lahore
Umpires: Khalid Mahmood and Sajid Afridi
Player of the match: Shoaib Malik (Sialkot Stallions)

- Quetta Bears won the toss and chose to field.
- Sardar Wali from Quetta Bears made his Twenty20 debut.

2 December
13:15
Scorecard

Karachi Zebras; 121/ (20 overs)	v	Islamabad Leopards; 117/9 (20 overs)
Faisal Iqbal 26 (33); Iftikhar Anjum 4/16 (4 overs)		Imad Wasim 34 (16); Haaris Ayaz 2/21 (4 overs)

Karachi Zebras won by 4 runs
Lahore City Cricket Association Ground, Lahore
Umpires: Ehtesham-ul-Haq and Raweed Khan
Player of the match: Iftikhar Anjum (Islamabad Leopards)

- Karachi Zebras won the toss and chose to bat.
- Adeel Malik from Karachi Zebras made Twenty20 debut.

3 December
12:00
Scorecard

Abbottabad Falcons; 120/8 (19.5 overs)	v	Islamabad Leopards; 116/8 (20 overs)
Mir Azam 59 (35); Umar Gul 4/21 (4 overs)		Imad Wasim 45 (32); Amjad Waqas 3/21 (4 overs)

Abbottabad Falcons won by 2 wickets
Gaddafi Stadium, Lahore
Umpires: Ahmed Shahab and Akram Raza
Player of the match: Mir Azam (Abbottabad Falcons)

- Islamabad Leopards won the toss and chose to bat

3 December
13:15
Scorecard

Lahore Lions; 182/4 (20 overs)	v	Multan Tigers; 152/5 (20 overs)
Ahmed Shehzad 68 (57); Kashif Naved 1/22 (3 overs)		Saeed Anwar 39 (34); Mustafa Iqbal 1/16 (2 overs)

Lahore Lions won by 30 runs
Bagh-e-Jinnah, Lahore
Umpires: Raweed Khan and Saleem Badar
Player of the match: Ahmed Shehzad (Lahore Lions)

- Lahore Lions won the toss and chose to bat
- Maqbool Ahmed from Multan Tigers made Twenty20 debut.

3 December
16:00 (D/N)
Scorecard

Karachi Zebras; 111/5 (20 overs)	v	Sialkot Stallions; 112/2 (16.4 overs)
Daniyal Ahsan 24* (22); Adeel Malik 3/19 (4 overs)		Shoaib Malik 50* (31); Adeel Malik 1/5 (1 overs)

Sialkot Stallions won by 8 wickets
Gaddafi Stadium, Lahore
Umpires: Ghaffar Kazmi and Zameer Haider
Player of the match: Shoaib Malik (Sialkot Stallions)

- Sialkot Stallions won the toss and chose to field
- Daniyal Ahsan from Karachi Zebras and Nayyer Abbas from Sialkot Stallions made Twenty20 debut.

4 December
09:30
Scorecard

Lahore Lions; 105/4 (14.5 overs)	v	Islamabad Leopards; 104/8 (20 overs)
Ahmed Shehzad 56 (45); Zohaib Ahmed 2/8 (2.5 overs)		Imad Wasim 20 (28); Aizaz Cheema 3/16 (4 overs)

Lahore Lions won by 6 wickets
Lahore City Cricket Association Ground, Lahore
Umpires: Majid Hussain and Tahir Shah
Player of the match: Ahmed Shehzad (Lahore Lions)

- Islamabad Leopards won the toss and Chose to bat
- Hamza Nadeem from Islamabad Leopards made Twenty20 debut.
- Islamabad Leopards were eliminated as a result of this match

4 December
12:00
Scorecard

Abbottabad Falcons; 106/8 (20 overs)	v	Multan Tigers; 99/9 (20 overs)
Younis Khan 35 (37); Mohammad Irfan 3/17 (4 overs)		Naved Yasin 37 (37); Ahmed Jamal 4/21 (4 overs)

Abbottabad Falcons won by 7 runs
Gaddafi Stadium, Lahore
Umpires: Kamal Merchant and Saleem Badar
Player of the match: Ahmed Jamal (Abbottabad Falcons)

- Multan Tigers won the toss and chose to field
- Baber Khan from Abbottabad Falcons made his Twenty20 debut.

4 December
13:15
Scorecard

Karachi Zebras; 126/3 (17.4 overs)	v	Quetta Bears; 125/9 (20 overs)
Fahad Iqbal 55* (51); Gohar Faiz 2/15 (3 overs)		Jalat Khan 25 (15); Faraz Ahmed 3/22 (4 overs)

Karachi Zebras won by 7 wickets
Lahore City Cricket Association Ground, Lahore
Umpires: Qaiser Waheed and Saqib Khan
Player of the match: Fahad Iqbal (Karachi Zebras)

- Quetta Bears won the toss and chose to bat

5 December
09:30
Scorecard

Abbottabad Falcons; 139/5 (20 overs)	v	Karachi Zebras; 135 (19.5 overs)
Younis Khan 48* (28); Haaris Ayaz 2/30 (4 overs)		Sheharyar Ghani 46 (33); Khalid Usman 3/23 (4 overs)

Abbottabad Falcons won by 5 wickets
Lahore City Cricket Association Ground, Lahore
Umpires: Tahir Shah and Nadeem Iqbal
Player of the match: Younis Khan (Abbottabad Falcons)

- Abbottabad Falcons won the toss and chose to field

5 December
09:30
Scorecard

Multan Tigers; 155/6 (20 overs)	v	Sialkot Stallions; 113/7 (20 overs)
Sohaib Maqsood 38 (41); Adeel Malik 3/17 (4 overs)		Nayyer Abbas 43 (38); Zulfiqar Babar 4/15 (4 overs)

Multan Tigers won by 42 runs
Bagh-e-Jinnah, Lahore
Umpires: Ahsan Raza and Ehtesham-ul-Haq
Player of the match: Zulfiqar Babar (Multan Tigers)

- Multan Tigers won the toss and chose to bat

5 December
13:15
Scorecard

Lahore Lions; 130/9 (20 overs)	v	Quetta Bears; 86/7 (20 overs)
Nasir Jamshed 26 (16); Mohibullah 3/15 (4 overs)		Mir Wais 16 (16); Tanzeel Altaf 2/1 (1 overs)

Lahore Lions won by 44 runs
Bagh-e-Jinnah, Lahore
Umpires: Kamal Merchant and Riazuddin
Player of the match: Mohibullah (Quetta Bears)

- Lahore Lions won the toss and elected to bat
- Abdul Ghaffar, Mohammad Irfan from Lahore Lions and Sher Ali from Quetta Bears made Twenty20 debut
- Quetta Bears were eliminated as a result of this match

6 December
09:30
Scorecard

Abbottabad Falcons; 130/7 (20 overs)	v	Sialkot Stallions; 164/6 (20 overs)
Yasir Hameed 37 (33); Naved-ul-Hasan 2/26 (4 overs)		Haris Sohail 62* (43); Junaid Khan 3/22 (4 overs)

Sialkot Stallions won by 34 runs
Bagh-e-Jinnah, Lahore
Umpires: Ahmed Shahab and Ghaffar Kazmi
Player of the match: Haris Sohail (Sialkot Stallions)

- Abbottabad Falcons won the toss and chose to field
- Lahore Lions qualified for the Semi-finals and Karachi Zebras were eliminated as a result of this match

6 December
09:30
Scorecard

Karachi Zebras; 123 (19.4 overs)	v	Multan Tigers; 140/6 (20 overs)
Javed Mansoor 35 (24); Rahat Ali 4/15 (3.4 overs)		Zain Abbas 46 (42); Haaris Ayaz 2/22 (4 overs)

Multan Tigers won by 17 runs
Lahore City Cricket Association Ground, Lahore
Umpires: Akmal Hayat and Aftab Gillani
Player of the match: Saeed Anwar (Multan Tigers)

- Karachi Zebras won the toss and chose to field

6 December
16:00 (D/N)
Scorecard

Islamabad Leopards; 115/5 (18.3 overs)	v	Quetta Bears; 111/7 ( 20 overs)
Junaid Nadir 32 (28); Arun Lal 1/4 (3 overs)		Farhan Khan 32 (32); Iftikhar Anjum 3/11 (4 overs)

Islamabad Leopards won by 5 wicket
Gaddafi Stadium, Lahore
Umpires: Riazuddin and Sajid Afridi
Player of the match: Iftikhar Anjum (Islamabad Leopards)

- Islamabad Leopards won the toss and chose to field
- Ghias Salman from Islamabad Leopards and Rameez Raja from Quetta Bears made Twenty20 debut

7 December
09:30
Scorecard

Abbottabad Falcons; 126/7 (20 overs)	v	Quetta Bears; 126/8 (20 overs)
Naushad Irshad 31 (20); Fazl-e-Rabbi 2/10 (3 overs)		Yasir Shah 26 (23); Jalat Khan 5/23 (4 overs)

Match tied (Abbottabad Falcons won the one-over eliminator)
Lahore City Cricket Association Ground, Lahore
Umpires: Qaiser Waheed and Saleem Badar

- Quetta Bears won the toss and chose to field

7 December
13:15
Scorecard

Islamabad Leopards; 135/4 (20 overs)	v	Multan Tigers; 137/5 (14 overs)
Imad Wasim 34* (20); Kashif Naved 1/20 (3 overs)		Saeed Anwar 43* (27); Iftikhar Anjum 1/19 (2 overs)

Multan Tigers won by 5 wickets
Lahore City Cricket Association Ground, Lahore
Umpires: Ahmed Shahab and Akram Raza
Player of the match: Saeed Anwar (Multan Tigers)

- Islamabad Leopards won the toss and elected to bat
- Abbottabad Falcons were eliminated as a result of this match

7 December
16:00 (D/N)
Scorecard

Lahore Lions; 166/5 (19.5 overs)	v	Sialkot Stallions; 160/5 (20 overs)
Ahmed Shehzad 59 (50); Nayyer Abbas 3/26 (4 overs)		Rana Naved-ul-Hasan 63 (41); Aizaz Cheema 2/38 (4 overs)

Lahore Lions won by 5 wickets
Gaddafi Stadium, Lahore
Umpires: Kamal Merchant and Nadeem Iqbal
Player of the match: Ahmed Shehzad (Lahore Lions)

- Lahore Lions, won the toss and chose to field
- Multan Tigers qualified for the Semi-finals and Sialkot Stallions were eliminated as a result of this match

==== Group B ====
Points Table

Team	Pld	W	L	NR	NRR	Pts
Faisalabad Wolves	6	6	0	0	+0.644	12
Bahawalpur Stags	6	5	1	0	+0.656	10
Rawalpindi Rams	6	4	2	0	+0.511	8
Karachi Dolphins	6	3	3	0	+0.414	6
Lahore Eagles	6	2	4	0	+0.437	4
Peshawar Panthers	6	1	5	0	−1.159	2
Hyderabad Hawks	6	0	6	0	−1.481	0

1 December
09:30
Scorecard

Bahawalpur Stags; 173/5 (20 overs)	v	Rawalpindi Rams; 154/9 (20 overs)
Imranullah Aslam 89 (53); Samiullah 2/27 (3 overs)		Naved Malik 51 (22); Kashif Siddiq 3/22 (4 overs)

Bahawalpur Stags won by 19 runs
Bagh-e-Jinnah, Lahore
Umpires: Ahmed Shahab and Zameer Haider
Player of the match: Imranullah Aslam (Bahawalpur Stags)

- Rawalpindi Rams won the toss and chose to field.
- Ataullah, Faisal Elahi and Hamid Ali from the Bahawalpur Stags and Umar Waheed from the Rawalpindi Rams made their Twenty20 debut.

1 December
09:30
Scorecard

Karachi Dolphins; 164/7 (20 overs)	v	Peshawar Panthers; 124 (19.2 overs)
Shahid Afridi 50 (38); Waqar Ahmed 2/28 (4 overs)		Iftikhar Ahmed 57 (47); Anwar Ali 2/24 (4 overs)

Karachi Dolphins won by 40 runs
Lahore City Cricket Association Ground, Lahore
Umpires: Akram Raza and Ghaffar Kazmi
Player of the match: Shahid Afridi (Karachi Dolphins)

- Peshawar Panthers won the toss and chose to field.
- Azizullah from the Peshawar Panthers made his Twenty20 debut.

1 December
13:15
Scorecard

Lahore Eagles; 224/2 (20 overs)	v	Hyderabad Hawks; 166/5 (20 overs)
Imran Farhat 112* (59); Nasir Awais 1/36 (4 overs)		Sharjeel Khan 101* (65); Asif Raza 2/18 (4 overs)

Lahore Eagles won by 58 runs
Lahore City Cricket Association Ground, Lahore
Umpires: Saleem Badar and Saqib Khan
Player of the match: Imran Farhat (Lahore Eagles)

- Lahore Eagles won the toss and chose to bat.
- Rehan Riaz from Hyderabad Hawks and Babar Azam and Qaiser Ashraf from Lahore Eagles made their Twenty20 debut.
- Fifth time in history of T20 cricket that two batsmen individually scored a century in a T20 match.

2 December
12:00
Scorecard

Lahore Eagles; 103 (19.4 overs)	v	Faisalabad Wolves; 104/5 (19.1 overs)
Imran Farhat 20 (16); Asad Ali 3/19 (3.4 overs)		Farrukh Shehzad 47 (42); Raza Ali Dar 2/21 (4 overs)

Faisalabad Wolves won by 5 wickets
Gaddafi Stadium, Lahore
Umpires: Riazuddin and Saleem Badar
Player of the match: Farrukh Shehzad (Faisalabad Wolves)

- Faisalabad Wolves won the toss and chose to field.
- Farrukh Shehzad from Faisalabad Wolves made Twenty20 debut.

2 December
13:15
Scorecard

Bahawalpur Stags; 134 (19 overs)	v	Peshawar Panthers; 105 (18.5 overs)
Bilal Khilji 33 (26); Imran Khan 2/21 (4 overs)		Mohammad Rizwan 36 (38); Kashif Siddiq 311 (4 overs)

Bahawalpur Stags won by 29 runs
Bagh-e-Jinnah, Lahore
Umpires: Akmal Hayat and Shozab Raza
Player of the match: Kashif Siddiq (Bahawalpur Stags)

- Bahawalpur Stags won the toss and chose to field.

2 December
16:00 (D/N)
Scorecard

Karachi Dolphins; 183/7 (20 overs)	v	Rawalpindi Rams; 188/5 (20 overs)
Khurram Manzoor 50 (37); Hammad Azam 2/27 (3 overs)		Umar Amin 52* (31); Tanvir Ahmed 2/28 (4 overs)

Rawalpindi Rams won by 5 runs
Gaddafi Stadium, Lahore
Umpires: Ahsan Raza and Tahir Shah
Player of the match: Umar Amin (Rawalpindi Rams)

- Rawalpindi Rams won the toss and chose to bat

3 December
09:30
Scorecard

Bahawalpur Stags; 153/8 (19.3 overs)	v	Karachi Dolphins; 152/6 (20 overs)
Imranullah Aslam 48 (32); Shahid Afridi 2/16 (4 overs)		Amin-ur-Rehman 44 (23); Mohammad Talha 3/43 (4 overs)

Bahawalpur Stags won by 2 wickets
Bagh-e-Jinnah, Lahore
Umpires: Ahsan Raza and Shozab Raza
Player of the match: Imranullah Aslam (Bahawalpur Stags)

- Bahawalpur Stags won the toss and chose to field

3 December
09:30
Scorecard

Lahore Eagles; 162/8 (20 overs)	v	Peshawar Panthers; 86/8 (20 overs)
Imran Farhat 68 (45); Waqar Ahmed 3/36 (4 overs)		Israrullah 22 (25); Mohammad Khalil 2/6 (3 overs)

Lahore Eagles won by 76 runs
Lahore City Cricket Association Ground, Lahore
Umpires: Kamal Merchant and Khalid Mahmood
Player of the match: Imran Farhat (Lahore Eagles)

- Peshawar Panthers won the toss and chose to field
- Usman Salahuddin from Lahore Eagles made his Twenty20 debut.

3 December
13:15
Scorecard

Faisalabad Wolves; 101/2 (16.1 overs)	v	Hyderabad Hawks; 97/8 (20 overs)
Farrukh Shehzad 57* (51); Kashif Bhatti 1/17 (4 overs)		Rizwan Ahmed 41 (49); Saeed Ajmal 2/14 (4 overs)

Faisalabad Wolves won by 8 wickets
Lahore City Cricket Association Ground, Lahore
Umpires: Tahir Shah and Riazuddin
Player of the match: Farrukh Shehzad (Faisalabad Wolves)

- Hyderabad Hawks won the toss and Chose to bat

4 December
09:30
Scorecard

Hyderabad Hawks; 141 (20 overs)	v	Peshawar Panthers; 185/5 (20 overs)
Kashif Bhatti 25 (14); Azizullah 3/29 (4 overs)		Nawaz Ahmed 53 (34); Rehan Nizamuddin 1/22 (4 overs)

Peshawar Panthers won by 44 runs
Bagh-e-Jinnah, Lahore
Umpires: Akmal Hayat and Zameer Haider
Player of the match: Nawaz Ahmed (Peshawar Panthers)

- Peshawar Panthers won the toss and chose to bat
- Wet outfield delays start of match

4 December
13:15
Scorecard

Faisalabad Wolves; 148/8 (20 overs)	v	Rawalpindi Rams; 131 (18.5 overs)
Ali Waqas 53 (47); Sohail Tanvir 3/23 (4 overs)		Umar Amin 47 (41); Asad Ali 3/27 (3.5 overs)

Faisalabad Wolves won by 17 runs
Bagh-e-Jinnah, Lahore
Umpires: Ahmed Shahab and Ehtesham-ul-Haq
Player of the match: Khurram Shehzad (Faisalabad Wolves)

- Faisalabad Wolves won the toss and chose to bat

4 December
16:00 (D/N)
Scorecard

Lahore Eagles; 113/8 (20 overs)	v	Karachi Dolphins; 115/7 (18.4 overs)
Saad Nasim 28* (21); Atif Maqbool 3/20 (4 overs)		Shahzaib Hasan 30 (30); Raza Ali Dar 3/16 (4 overs)

Karachi Dolphins won by 3 wickets
Gaddafi Stadium, Lahore
Umpires: Aftab Gillani and Sajid Afridi
Player of the match: Atif Maqbool (Karachi Dolphins) and Shahzaib Hasan (Lahore Eagles)

- Karachi Dolphins won the toss and chose to field

5 December
12:00
Scorecard

Faisalabad Wolves; 137/3 (18.2 overs)	v	Peshawar Panthers; 135/4 (20 overs)
Misbah-ul-Haq 43* (29); Akbar Badshah 1/18 (3 overs)		Israrullah 56 (41); Khurram Shehzad 1/14 (4 overs)

Faisalabad Wolves won by 7 wickets
Gaddafi Stadium, Lahore
Umpires: Khalid Mahmood and Shozab Raza
Player of the match: Misbah-ul-Haq (Faisalabad Wolves)

- Faisalabad Wolves won the toss and chose to field
- Hasan Mahmood from Faisalabad Wolves made Twenty20 debut
- Peshawar Panthers were eliminated as a result of this match

5 December
13:15
Scorecard

Bahawalpur Stags; 140/2 (17.1 overs)	v	Lahore Eagles; 136/7 (20 overs)
Imranullah Aslam 60 (46); Waqas Aslam 1/18 (4 overs)		Taufeeq Umar 53 (45); Mohammad Talha 2/19 (4 overs)

Bahawalpur Stags won by 8 wickets
Lahore City Cricket Association Ground, Lahore
Umpires: Saleem Badar and Sajid Afridi
Player of the match: Imranullah Aslam (Bahawalpur Stags)

- Lahore Eagles won the toss and chose to bat
- Lahore Eagles and Hyderabad Hawks were eliminated as a result of this match

5 December
16:00 (D/N)
Scorecard

Hyderabad Hawks; 158/6 (20 overs)	v	Rawalpindi Rams; 177/6 (20 overs)
Aqeel Anjum 75* (48); Awais Zia 2/24 (4 overs)		Shoaib Ahmed 50* (41); Lal Kumar 2/39 (4 overs)

Rawalpindi Rams won by 19 runs
Gaddafi Stadium, Lahore
Umpires: Akram Raza and Qaiser Waheed
Player of the match: Aqeel Anjum (Hyderabad Hawks)

- Rawalpindi Rams won the toss and elected to bat
- Zeeshan Gul from Hyderabad Hawks made Twenty20 debut

6 December
12:00
Scorecard

Bahawalpur Stags; 154/7 (20 overs)	v	Hyderabad Hawks; 143/8 (20 overs)
Ali Haider 40 (26); Rehan Riaz 2/26 (4 overs)		Azeem Ghumman 34 (33); Bilal Khilji 2/24 (3 overs)

Bahawalpur Stags won by 11 runs
Gaddafi Stadium, Lahore
Umpires: Ahsan Raza and Ehtesham-ul-Haq
Player of the match: Bilal Khilji (Bahawalpur Stags)

- Bahawalpur Stags won the toss and chose to bat
- Mohammad Shehroz from Hyderabad Hawks made Twenty20 debut
- Bahawalpur Stags qualified for the Semi-finals as a result of this match

6 December
13:15
Scorecard

Lahore Eagles; 155/5 (20 overs)	v	Rawalpindi Rams; 156/2 (14.3 overs)
Saad Nasim 44 (36); Yasir Arafat 3/37 (4 overs)		Naved Malik 77 (41); Qaiser Ashraf 1/24 (3 overs)

Rawalpindi Rams won by 8 wickets
Lahore City Cricket Association Ground, Lahore
Umpires: Akram Raza and Zameer Haider
Player of the match: Naved Malik (Rawalpindi Rams)

- Lahore Eagles won the toss and chose to bat

6 December
13:15
Scorecard

Faisalabad Wolves; 148/8 (20 overs)	v	Karachi Dolphins; 147/6 (20 overs)
Misbah-ul-Haq 72* (47); Misbah Khan 3/44 (4 overs)		Khurram Manzoor 51 (41); Ehsan Adil 4/28 (4 overs)

Faisalabad Wolves won by 2 wickets
Bagh-e-Jinnah, Lahore
Umpires: Majid Hussain and Qaiser Waheed

- Karachi Dolphins won the toss and chose to bat
- Asad Baig, Behram Khan and Mir Hamza from Karachi Dolphins and Ehsan Adil from Faisalabad Wolves made Twenty20 debut
- Faisalabad Wolves qualified for the Semi-finals and Rawalpindi Rams and Karachi Dolphins were eliminated as a result of this match

7 December
09:30
Scorecard

Peshawar Panthers; 141/7 (20 overs)	v	Rawalpindi Rams; 144/3 (17.2 overs)
Jamaluddin 32 (25); Hammad Azam 3/24 (4 overs)		Naved Malik 67* (42); Mohammad Aslam 1/27 (4 overs)

Rawalpindi Rams won by 7 wickets
Bagh-e-Jinnah, Lahore
Umpires: Aftab Gillani and Nadeem Iqbal
Player of the match: Naved Malik (Rawalpindi Rams)

- Rawalpindi Rams won the toss and chose to field
- Wet outfield delays start of match

7 December
09:30
Scorecard

Bahawalpur Stags; 111/8 (20 overs)	v	Faisalabad Wolves; 121/7 (20 overs)
Moinuddin 22 (24); Ehsan Adil 3/23 (4 overs)		Farrukh Shehzad 31 (37); Kashif Siddiq 2/16 (4 overs)

Faisalabad Wolves won by 10 runs
Gaddafi Stadium, Lahore
Umpires: Ghaffar Kazmi and Saqib Khan
Player of the match: Farrukh Shehzad (Faisalabad Wolves)

- Bahawalpur Stags won the toss and chose to field
- Wet outfield delays start of match

7 December
13:15
Scorecard

Hyderabad Hawks; 161/4 (20 overs)	v	Karachi Dolphins; 165/4 (19.3 overs)
Azeem Ghumman 71* (53); Sohail Khan 2/54 (4 overs)		Fawad Alam 65* (49); Rehan Riaz 3/29 (4 overs)

Karachi Dolphins won by 6 wickets
Bagh-e-Jinnah, Lahore
Umpires: Ehtesham-ul-Haq and Tahir Shah
Player of the match: Fawad Alam (Karachi Dolphins) and Khurram Manzoor (Karachi Dolphins)

- Hyderabad Hawks won the toss and chose to bat

=== Knockout stage ===
Semifinals
A1	Lahore Lions	211/5 (20 overs)
B2	Bahawalpur Stags	160 (19.2 overs)
B1	Faisalabad Wolves	122/5 (19 overs)
A2	Multan Tigers	120/7 (20 overs)

Final
SF1	Lahore Lions	154/7 (20 overs)
SF2	Faisalabad Wolves	121/8 (20 overs)

==== Semi-finals ====
8 December
12:00
Scorecard

Lahore Lions; 211/5 (20 overs)	v	Bahawalpur Stags; 160 (19.2 overs)
Ahmed Shehzad 107 (57); Kamran Hussain 4/23 (4 overs)		Imranullah Aslam 43 (32); Wahab Riaz 3/23 (3.2 overs)

Lahore Lions won by 51 runs
Gaddafi Stadium, Lahore
Umpires: Ahsan Raza and Riazuddin
Player of the match: Ahmed Shehzad (Lahore Lions)

- Bahawalpur Stags won the toss and chose to field
- Lahore Lions qualified for the Final and Bahawalpur Stags were eliminated as a result of this match

8 December
16:00 (D/N)
Scorecard

Multan Tigers; 120/7 (20 overs)	v	Faisalabad Wolves; 122/5 (19 overs)
Naved Yasin 46 (46); Asad Ali 2/17 (4 overs)		Asif Ali; Zulfiqar Babar 1/15 (4 overs)

Faisalabad Wolves won by 5 wickets
Gaddafi Stadium, Lahore
Umpires: Shozab Raza and Zameer Haider
Player of the match: Asif Ali (Faisalabad Wolves)

- Multan Tigers won the toss and chose to bat
- Faisalabad Wolves qualify for the Final and Multan Tigers are eliminated as a result of this match

==== Final ====
9 December
Scorecard

Lahore Lions; 154/7 (20 overs)	v	Faisalabad Wolves; 121/8 (20 overs)
Nasir Jamshed 42 (28); Ehsan Adil 3/23 (4 overs)		Misbah-ul-Haq 37 (37); Mohammad Hafeez 4/11 (4 overs)

Lahore Lions won by 33 runs
Gaddafi Stadium, Lahore
Umpires: Ahsan Raza and Zameer Haider
Player of the match: Mohammad Hafeez (Lahore Lions)

- Lahore Lions won the toss and chose to bat
- Lahore Lions won the 2012–13 Faysal Bank T20 Cup and Faisalabad Wolves are Runner-up as a result of this match

== Statistics ==
The tables below show the top five holders for each class of record. If the fifth place is shared then all holders are shown. Last updated on 10 December 2012

High Scores (balls played)

Imran Farhat	112* (59)
Ahmed Shehzad	107 (57)
Sharjeel Khan	101* (65)
Imranullah Aslam	89 (53)
Naved Malik	77 (41)

Most runs (innings played)

Ahmed Shehzad	391 (8)
Imranullah Aslam	262 (7)
Naved Malik	239 (6)
Imran Farhat	223 (6)
Sharjeel Khan	215 (6)

Most fifties (innings played)

Ahmed Shehzad	4 (8)
Mohammad Hafeez	3 (5)
Khurram Manzoor	3 (6)
Naved Malik	3 (6)
Taufeeq Umar	2 (5)

Most Sixes (in an inning)

Naved Malik	7
Sharjeel Khan	7
Rana Naved-ul-Hasan	5
Shahzaib Hasan	4
Umar Akmal	4

Most Sixes (innings played)

Naved Malik	15 (6)
Sharjeel Khan	11 (6)
Moinuddin	9 (6)
Shahzaib Hasan	7 (6)
Mohammad Hafeez	6 (5)

Highest strike rates

Mohammad Talha	188.88
Abdul Razzaq	176.19
Naved Malik	170.71
Amin-ur-Rehman	167.85
Anwar Ali	161.76

Best Bowling (overs)

Jalat Khan	5/23 (4)
Mohammad Hafeez	4/11 (4)
Shoaib Malik	4/13 (4)
Zulfiqar Babar	4/15 (4)
Rahat Ali	4/15 (3.4)

Most Wickets (innings played)

Asad Ali	15 (8)
Kamran Hussain	12 (7)
Mohammad Hafeez	11 (7)
Kashif Siddiq	11 (7)
Mohammad Irfan	11 (7)

Best economy (Minimum five overs)

Raza Hasan	3.33
Saeed Ajmal	4.16
Asif Raza	4.52
Arun Lal	4.52
Zulfiqar Babar	4.62

Highest Team Totals (overs)

Lahore Eagles	224/2 (20)
Lahore Lions	211/5 (20)
Rawalpindi Rams	188/5 (20)
Lahore Lions	186/4 (20)
Peshawar Panthers	185/5 (20)

Highest Match aggregates (overs)

Lahore Eagles	Hyderabad Hawks	390/7 (40)
Lahore Lions	Bahawalpur Stags	371/15 (39.2)
Karachi Dolphins	Rawalpindi Rams	371/12 (40)
Lahore Lions	Abbottabad Falcons	342/10 (40)
Hyderabad Hawks	Rawalpindi Rams	335/12 (40)

== Sponsors ==
- PCB
- Faysal Bank
- Fly Emirates
- Haier Inspired Living
- Advance Telecom
- Easypaisa
- Medicam Toothpaste

== See also ==
- Pakistani cricket team in India in 2012–13
- Faysal Bank T20 Cup
- Pakistan Super League T20
- Champions League Twenty20
- Faysal Bank Super Eight T20 Cup
- Twenty20 Cricket
- 2012–13 Big Bash League
- President's Trophy 2012–13
- Quaid-e-Azam Trophy 2012–13
- Faysal Bank One Day Cup 2012–13
