= 2011 Super 8 Twenty20 Cup =

2011 Faysal Bank Super Eight T20 Cup
- Administrator: Pakistan Cricket Board
- Cricket format: Twenty20
- Tournament format(s): Round-robin and knockout
- Champions: Rawalpindi Rams (1st title)
- Participants: 8
- Matches: 15
- Most runs: Rameez Raja (238, Karachi Dolphins)
- Most wickets: Sohail Khan (14, Karachi Dolphins)

The 2011 Faysal Bank Super Eight T20 Cup was the first season of the Faysal Bank Super Eight T20 Cup. The tournament was held from 24 June in Faisalabad, between the top eight teams from the 2010–11 Faysal Bank T20 Cup. The winners were awarded ₨ 2.5 million in prize money while the runners-up received ₨ 1 million. The Rawalpindi Rams won the tournament by defeating the Karachi Dolphins in the final in the Super Over.

== Results ==
=== Teams and standings ===
Group A
| Team | Pld | W | L | T | NR | Pts | NRR |
|---|---|---|---|---|---|---|---|
| Lahore Lions | 3 | 3 | 0 | 0 | 0 | 6 | +1.600 |
| Sialkot Stallions | 3 | 2 | 1 | 0 | 0 | 4 | –0.060 |
| Hyderabad Hawks | 3 | 1 | 2 | 0 | 0 | 2 | –0.557 |
| Islamabad Leopards | 3 | 0 | 3 | 0 | 0 | 0 | –0.980 |

Group B
| Team | Pld | W | L | T | NR | Pts | NRR |
|---|---|---|---|---|---|---|---|
| Karachi Dolphins | 3 | 2 | 1 | 0 | 0 | 4 | +1.983 |
| Rawalpindi Rams | 3 | 2 | 1 | 0 | 0 | 4 | +1.169 |
| Faisalabad Wolves | 3 | 1 | 2 | 0 | 0 | 2 | –1.443 |
| Multan Tigers | 3 | 1 | 2 | 0 | 0 | 2 | –1.824 |

Qualified for semifinals
Points table on ESPNcricinfo

=== Knockout stage ===
Semifinals
A1 | Lahore Lions | 139/9
B2 | Rawalpindi Rams | 186/4
B1 | Karachi Dolphins | 238/5
A2 | Sialkot Stallions | 196

Finals
B2 | Rawalpindi Rams (D/L; Super Over) | 164
B1 | Karachi Dolphins | 164/5

== Venue ==
All matches of the tournament were played at Iqbal Stadium, Faisalabad. Its capacity is 25,000.

== Squads ==
Faisalabad Wolves

- Misbah-ul-Haq (c)
- Abdul Rauf
- Ali Waqas
- Asif Ali
- Asif Hussain (wk)
- Faisal Yasin
- Hasan Mahmood
- Khurram Shehzad
- Mohammad Hafeez
- Mohammad Shahid
- Mohammad Talha
- Mustansar Hussain
- Naved Latif
- Zahoor Khan
- Zulqarnain

Hyderabad Hawks

- Azeem Ghumman (c)
- Aqeel Anjum
- Ayaz Jamali
- Faisal Athar (wk)
- Farhan Ayub
- Ghulam Yasin
- Jamshed Baig
- Mir Ali
- Nasir Awais
- Nauman Ali
- Shahid Qambrani
- Sharjeel Khan
- Suleman Baloch
- Zahid Mahmood

Islamabad Leopards

- Iftikhar Anjum (c)
- Afaq Raheem
- Ameer Khan
- Imad Wasim
- Naeem Anjum (wk)
- Nasrullah Khan
- Nauman Masood
- Qaiser Rehman
- Raheel Majeed
- Saad Altaf
- Shan Masood
- Umair Khan
- Umar Gul
- Zeeshan Mushtaq
- Zohaib Ahmed

Karachi Dolphins

- Mohammad Sami (c)
- Asad Shafiq
- Azam Hussain
- Fawad Alam
- Haaris Ayaz
- Khalid Latif
- Misbah Khan
- Rameez Aziz
- Rameez Raja Jr.
- Sarfraz Ahmed (wk)
- Shahzaib Hasan
- Sohail Khan
- Tanvir Ahmed
- Tariq Haroon

Lahore Lions

- Mohammad Yousuf (c)
- Abid Ali
- Ahmed Dar
- Ahmed Shehzad
- Aizaz Cheema
- Emmad Ali
- Kamran Akmal (wk)
- Mohammad Waheed
- Nasir Jamshed
- Saad Nasim
- Shabbir Ahmed
- Umar Akmal
- Usman Salahuddin
- Waqas Aslam

Multan Tigers

- Abdur Rauf (c)
- Ahmed Raza
- Ali Moazzam
- Ansar Javed
- Gulraiz Sadaf (wk)
- Mohammad Irfan
- Mohammad Zahid
- Naved Yasin
- Rameez Alam
- Taimur Ahmed
- Yasir Arafat
- Zain Abbas
- Zeeshan Ashraf
- Zulfiqar Babar

Rawalpindi Rams

- Sohail Tanvir (c)
- Adnan Mufti
- Awais Zia
- Hammad Azam
- Jamal Anwar (wk)
- Mohammad Ayaz
- Mohammad Nawaz
- Mohammad Rameez
- Muzammil Nizam
- Naved Malik
- Raza Hasan
- Rizwan Akbar
- Sadaf Hussain
- Samiullah
- Tayyab Riaz
- Umar Amin
- Usman Saeed
- Zahid Mansoor

Sialkot Stallions

- Shoaib Malik (c)
- Abdur Rehman
- Adeel Malik
- Ali Khan
- Faisal Naved
- Farhan Malik
- Haris Sohail
- Imran Nazir
- Mansoor Amjad
- Mohammad Ali
- Muntazir Mehdi
- Naved-ul-Hasan
- Prince Abbas
- Qaiser Abbas
- Sarfraz Ahmed
- Sarmad Anwar
- Shahid Yousuf
- Shakeel Ansar (wk)
- Umaid Asif

== Fixtures ==
All match times in Pakistan Standard Time (UTC+5:30).

=== Group stage ===
==== Group A ====
25 June
17:00 (D/N)
Scorecard

| Islamabad Leopards; 164 (19.2 overs) | v | Hyderabad Hawks; 165/7 (19.1 overs) |
| Zohaib Ahmed 55 (40); Ghulam Yasin 4/44 (4 overs) | | Sharjeel Khan 61 (33); Zohaib Ahmed 3/27 (4 overs) |

Hyderabad Hawks won by 3 wickets
Iqbal Stadium, Faisalabad
Umpires: Anis-ur-Rehman and Shozab Raza
Player of the match: Sharjeel Khan (Hyderabad)

- Hyderabad Hawks won the toss and elected to bat.

25 June
21:00 (D/N)
Scorecard

| Lahore Lions; 218/6 (20 overs) | v | Sialkot Stallions; 173 (19.2 overs) |
| Ahmed Shehzad 74 (47); Umaid Asif 3/34 (4 overs) | | Ali Khan 67 (37); Imran Ali 3/11 (3 overs) |

Lahore Lions won by 45 runs
Iqbal Stadium, Faisalabad
Umpires: Akbar Khan and Khalid Mahmood
Player of the match: Ahmed Shehzad (Lahore)

- Lahore Lions won the toss and elected to bat.

27 June
17:00 (D/N)
Scorecard

| Sialkot Stallions; 183/5 (20 overs) | v | Hyderabad Hawks; 150 (18.2 overs) |
| Shahid Yousuf 48 (35); Nasir Awais 2/32 (4 overs) | | Sharjeel Khan 74 (41); Sarmad Anwar 3/23 (4 overs) |

Sialkot Stallions won by 33 runs
Iqbal Stadium, Faisalabad, Pakistan
Umpires: Ahsan Raza and Shozab Raza
Player of the match: Sarmad Anwar (Sialkot)

- Hyderabade Hawks won the toss and elected to field.

27 June
21:00 (D/N)
Scorecard

| Lahore Lions; 148/9 (20 overs) | v | Islamabad Leopards; 105 (18.5 overs) |
| Kamran Akmal 44 (37); Nasrullah Khan 3/25 (4 overs) | | Shan Masood 32 (34); Imran Ali 3/10 (3 overs) |

Lahore Lions won by 43 runs
Iqbal Stadium, Faisalabad
Umpires: Islam Khan and Shakeel Khan
Player of the match: Imran Ali (Lahore)

- Lahore Lions won the toss and elected to bat.

29 June
17:00 (D/N)
Scorecard

| Islamabad Leopards; 170/9 (20 overs) | v | Sialkot Stallions; 171/6 (19.1 overs) |
| Nauman Masood 47 (24); Abdur Rehman 3/28 (4 overs) | | Shakeel Ansar 55 (34); Saad Altaf 2/24 (4 overs) |

Sialkot Stallions won by 4 wickets
Iqbal Stadium, Faisalabad
Umpires: Ghaffar Kazmi and Saleem Badar
Player of the match: Nauman Masood (Islamabad)

- Islamabad Leopards won the toss and elected to bat.

29 June
21:00 (D/N)
Scorecard

| Lahore Lions; 160/9 (20 overs) | v | Hyderabad Hawks; 151/7 (20 overs) |
| Ahmed Shehzad 78 (49); Nasir Awais 3/25 (4 overs) | | Azeem Ghumman 43 (45); Aizaz Cheema 3/18 (4 overs) |

Lahore Lions won by 9 runs
Iqbal Stadium, Faisalabad
Umpires: Kaukab Butt and Shakeel Khan
Player of the match: Ahmed Shehzad (Lahore)

- Lahore Lions won the toss and elected to bat.

==== Group B ====
24 June
17:00 (D/N)
Scorecard

| Faisalabad Wolves; 199/3 (20 overs) | v | Multan Tigers; 130 (18.2 overs) |
| Asif Ali 100 (59); Abdur Rauf 1/36 (4 overs) | | Zeeshan Ashraf 27 (23); Hasan Mahmood 5/23 (4 overs) |

Faisalabad Wolves won by 69 runs
Iqbal Stadium, Faisalabad
Umpires: Iqbal Butt and Khalid Mahmood
Player of the match: Asif Ali (Faisalabad)

- Multan Tigers won the toss and elected to field.

24 June
21:00 (D/N)
Scorecard

| Karachi Dolphins; 145/7 (20 overs) | v | Rawalpindi Rams; 136 (20 overs) |
| Shahzaib Hasan 35 (28b); Samiullah 2/23 (4 overs) | | Umar Amin 54* (45); Azam Hussain 3/38 (4 overs) |

Karachi Dolphins won by 9 runs
Iqbal Stadium, Faisalabad
Umpires: Akbar Khan and Ghaffar Kazmi
Player of the match: Azam Hussain (Karachi)

- Karachi Dolphins won the toss and elected to bat.

26 June
17:00 (D/N)
Scorecard

| Multan Tigers; 161/6 (20 overs) | v | Karachi Dolphins; 147/9 (20 overs) |
| Zain Abbas 85 (65); Haaris Ayaz 2/25 (4 overs) | | Khalid Latif 51 (50); Zulfiqar Babar 4/18 (4 overs) |

Multan Tigers won by 14 runs
Iqbal Stadium, Faisalabad
Umpires: Ahmed Shahab and Anis-ur-Rehman
Player of the match: Zain Abbas (Multan) and Zulfiqar Babar (Multan)

- Multan Tigers won the toss and elected to bat.

26 June
21:00 (D/N)
Scorecard

| Faisalabad Wolves; 140/7 (20 overs) | v | Rawalpindi Rams; 142/6 (16.4 overs) |
| Misbah-ul-Haq 36 (42); Sohail Tanvir 2/23 (4 overs) | | Naved Malik 55 (30); Mohammad Hafeez 3/24 (4 overs) |

Rawalpindi Rams won by 4 wickets
Iqbal Stadium, Faisalabad
Umpires: Ghaffar Kazmi and Tahir Shah
Player of the match: Naved Malik (Rawalpindi)

- Faisalabad Wolves won the toss and elected to bat.

28 June
17:00 (D/N)
Scorecard

| Karachi Dolphins; 231/7 (20 overs) | v | Faisalabad Wolves; 107 (13.3 overs) |
| Shahzaib Hasan 69 (28); Khurram Shehzad 2/21 (2 overs) | | Naved Latif 20 (11); Haaris Ayaz 3/26 (3 overs) |

Karachi Dolphins won by 124 runs
Iqbal Stadium, Faisalabad
Umpires: Ahmed Shahab and Kaukab Butt
Player of the match: Shahzaib Hasan (Karachi)

- Karachi Dolphins won the toss and elected to bat.

28 June
21:00 (D/N)
Scorecard

| Multan Tigers; 128 (19.5 overs) | v | Rawalpindi Rams; 134/3 (14.3 overs) |
| Yasir Arafat 27 (22); Raza Hasan 4/21 (4 overs) | | Sohail Tanvir 39* (25); Zulfiqar Babar 1/23 (3 overs) |

Rawalpindi Rams won by 7 wickets
Iqbal Stadium, Faisalabad
Umpires: Nadeem Ghauri and Riazuddin
Player of the match: Raza Hasan (Rawalpindi)

- Multan Tigers won the toss and elected to bat.

=== Knockout stage ===
Semi-finals

30 June
17:00 (D/N)
Scorecard

| Rawalpindi Rams; 186/4 (20 overs) | v | Lahore Lions; 139/9 (20 overs) |
| Jamal Anwar 67 (48); Emmad Ali 1/26 (3 overs) | | Adnan Rasool 41* (24); Raza Hasan 2/21 (4 overs) |

Rawalpindi Rams won by 47 runs
Iqbal Stadium, Faisalabad
Umpires: Ahmed Shahab and Shakeel Khan
Player of the match: Jamal Anwar (Rawalpindi)

- Rawalpindi Rams won the toss and elected to bat.

30 June
21:00 (D/N)
Scorecard

| Karachi Dolphins; 238/5 (20 overs) | v | Sialkot Stallions; 196 (18.5 overs) |
| Rameez Raja 97 (45); Ali Khan 2/43 (3 overs) | | Shoaib Malik 61 (30); Sohail Khan 4/18 (4 overs) |

Karachi Dolphins won by 42 runs
Iqbal Stadium, Faisalabad
Umpires: Nadeem Ghauri and Riazuddin
Player of the match: Rameez Raja (Karachi)

- Karachi Dolphins won the toss and elected to bat.

Final

1 July
19:00 (D/N)
Scorecard

| Karachi Dolphins; 164/5 (20 overs) | v | Rawalpindi Rams; 164 (20 overs) |
| Awais Zia 43 (20); Sohail Khan 5/23 (4 overs) | | Rameez Raja 64 (46); Raza Hasan 3/24 (4 overs) |

Scores level; Rawalpindi Rams won the Super Over
Iqbal Stadium, Faisalabad
Attendance: 24,610
Umpires: Ahsan Raza and Saleem Badar
Player of the match: Sohail Khan (Karachi)

- Rawalpindi Rams won the toss and elected to field.

== Statistics ==
=== Most runs ===
The top five highest run scorers (total runs) in the season are included in this table.

| Player | Team | Inns | Runs | Balls | Ave | SR | HS | 100 | 50 | 4s | 6s |
|---|---|---|---|---|---|---|---|---|---|---|---|
| Rameez Raja | Karachi Dolphins | 5 | 238 | 149 | 47.60 | 159.73 | 97 | 0 | 2 | 24 | 13 |
| Asad Shafiq | Karachi Dolphins | 5 | 174 | 130 | 43.50 | 133.84 | 91* | 0 | 1 | 19 | 5 |
| Ahmed Shehzad | Lahore Lions | 4 | 170 | 112 | 42.50 | 151.78 | 78 | 0 | 2 | 23 | 5 |
| Shahid Yousuf | Sialkot Stallions | 4 | 147 | 110 | 36.75 | 133.63 | 48 | 0 | 0 | 12 | 6 |
| Sharjeel Khan | Hyderabad Hawks | 3 | 138 | 86 | 46.00 | 160.46 | 74 | 0 | 2 | 10 | 11 |

Full Table on Cricinfo

=== Highest scores ===
This table contains the top five highest scores of the season made by a batsman in a single innings.

| Player | Team | Score | Balls | 4s | 6s | Opponent |
|---|---|---|---|---|---|---|
| Asif Ali | Faisalabad Wolves | 100 | 59 | 9 | 7 | Multan Tigers |
| Rameez Raja | Karachi Dolphins | 97 | 45 | 11 | 5 | Sialkot Stallions |
| Asad Shafiq | Karachi Dolphins | 91* | 51 | 9 | 4 | Sialkot Stallions |
| Zain Abbas | Multan Tigers | 85 | 65 | 10 | 3 | Karachi Dolphins |
| Ahmed Shehzad | Lahore Lions | 78 | 49 | 8 | 3 | Hyderabad Hawks |

Full Table on Cricinfo

=== Most wickets ===
The following table contains the five leading wicket-takers of the season.

| Player | Team | Wkts | Mat | Ave | SR | Econ | BBI |
|---|---|---|---|---|---|---|---|
| Sohail Khan | Karachi Dolphins | 14 | 4 | 7.50 | 6.8 | 6.56 | 5/23 |
| Raza Hasan | Rawalpindi Rams | 11 | 5 | 11.27 | 10.9 | 6.20 | 4/21 |
| Azam Hussain | Karachi Dolphins | 10 | 5 | 14.60 | 9.9 | 8.84 | 3/26 |
| Haaris Ayaz | Karachi Dolphins | 9 | 5 | 18.11 | 12.6 | 8.57 | 3/38 |
| Mohammad Hafeez | Faisalabad Wolves | 7 | 3 | 10.57 | 10.2 | 6.16 | 3/24 |

Full Table on Cricinfo

=== Best bowling figures ===
This table lists the top five players with the best bowling figures in the season.

| Player | Team | Overs | Figures | Opponent |
|---|---|---|---|---|
| Hasan Mahmood | Faisalabad Wolves | 4.0 | 5/23 | Multan Tigers |
| Sohail Khan | Karachi Dolphins | 4.0 | 5/23 | Rawalpindi Rams |
| Zulfiqar Babar | Multan Tigers | 4.0 | 4/18 | Karachi Dolphins |
| Sohail Khan | Karachi Dolphins | 4.0 | 4/18 | Sialkot Stallions |
| Raza Hasan | Rawalpindi Rams | 4.0 | 4/21 | Multan Tigers |

Full Table on Cricinfo

=== Player awards ===
The following table lists awards which were handed out to players who performed well throughout the tournament

| Award | Player | Team |
|---|---|---|
| Best batsman | Rameez Raja | Karachi Dolphins |
| Best bowler | Sohail Khan | Karachi Dolphins |
| Best fielders | Misbah-ul-Haq | Faisalabad Wolves |
| Best fielders | Rameez Raja | Karachi Dolphins |
| Best wicket-keepers | Kamran Akmal | Lahore Lions |
| Best wicket-keepers | Jamal Anwar | Rawalpindi Rams |
