= 2012 Super 8 Twenty20 Cup =

2012 Faysal Bank Super Eight T20 Cup
- Administrator: Pakistan Cricket Board
- Cricket format: Twenty20
- Tournament format(s): Round-robin and knockout
- Champions: Sialkot Stallions (1st title)
- Runners-up: Karachi Dolphins
- Participants: 8
- Matches: 15
- Most runs: Khalid Latif, Karachi (243)
- Most wickets: Raza Hasan, Sialkot (12)

The 2012 Faysal Bank Super Eight T20 Cup was the second season of the Faysal Bank Super Eight T20 Cup, a domestic Twenty20 cricket tournament organized by the Pakistan Cricket Board. The season began on 25 March 2012 and was held at the Rawalpindi Cricket Stadium in Rawalpindi. 15 matches were played during the tournament.

Sialkot Stallions won the tournament after beating Karachi Dolphins in the final, and, therefore, qualified for the 2012 Champions League Twenty20.

== Venue ==
All the matches were played at Rawalpindi Cricket Stadium, Rawalpindi.

City	Ground	Capacity	Matches
Rawalpindi, Punjab	Rawalpindi Cricket Stadium	Capacity:15,000	15
2012 Super 8 Twenty20 Cup is located in Pakistan

== Squads ==
The squads are as follows:

Faisalabad Wolves

- Misbah-ul-Haq (c)
- Ali Raza
- Ali Waqas
- Asad Ali
- Asif Ali
- Farrukh Shehzad
- Imran Ali
- Imran Khalid
- Jahandad Khan
- Khurram Shehzad
- Mohammad Hafeez
- Mohammad Salman (wk)
- Mohammad Talha
- Naved Latif
- Sabir Hussain
- Saeed Ajmal
- Shahid Nazir
- Waqas Maqsood

Peshawar Panthers

- Umar Gul (c)
- Afaq Ahmed
- Aftab Alam
- Akbar Badshah
- Gauhar Ali (wk)
- Imran Khan
- Israrullah
- Jamaluddin
- Mohammad Aslam
- Mohammad Fayyaz
- Mohammad Rizwan
- Musadiq Ahmed
- Rafatullah Mohmand
- Riaz Afridi
- Sajjad Ahmed
- Shoaib Khan
- Waqar Ahmed
- Zohaib Khan

Lahore Lions

- Kamran Akmal (c & wk)
- Abdul Razzaq
- Adnan Rasool
- Ahmed Shehzad
- Aizaz Cheema
- Asif Yousuf
- Fahad-ul-Haq
- Imran Ali
- Jahangir Mirza
- Kashif Siddiq
- Nasir Jamshed
- Jamshed Ahmed
- Raza Ali Dar
- Sohail Ahmed
- Tanzeel Altaf
- Umar Akmal
- Wahab Riaz

Karachi Zebras

- Hasan Raza (c)
- Adnan Baig
- Akbar-ur-Rehman
- Anwar Ali
- Atif Maqbool
- Azam Hussain
- Danish Kaneria
- Fahad Iqbal
- Faisal Iqbal
- Fakhar Zaman
- Khurram Manzoor
- Rameez Aziz
- Mohammad Hasan (wk)
- Saeed Bin Nasir
- Uzair-ul-Haq
- Zohaib Shera
- Tabish Khan

Sialkot Stallions

- Shoaib Malik (c)
- Abdur Rehman
- Ali Akbar
- Ali Khan
- Haris Sohail
- Imran Nazir
- Kamran Younis
- Kashif Sohail
- Mansoor Amjad
- Mohammad Ayub
- Naved-ul-Hasan
- Naved Arif
- Qaiser Abbas
- Raza Hasan
- Rizwan Sultan
- Sarfraz Ahmed
- Shahid Yousuf
- Shakeel Ansar (wk)

Lahore Eagles

- Taufeeq Umar (c)
- Adnan Akmal (wk)
- Adnan Raza
- Ali Azmat
- Asif Ashfaq
- Asif Raza
- Azhar Ali
- Emmad Ali
- Fahad Masood
- Hamza Paracha
- Imran Farhat
- Junaid Zia
- Kamran Sajid
- Mohammad Khalil
- Mustafa Iqbal
- Saad Nasim
- Usman Salahuddin
- Waqas Aslam

Karachi Dolphins

- Mohammad Sami (c)
- Ahmed Iqbal
- Asad Baig
- Asad Shafiq
- Faraz Ahmed
- Fawad Alam
- Haaris Ayaz
- Javed Mansoor
- Khalid Latif
- Mir Hamza
- Rameez Raja
- Rumman Raees
- Sarfraz Ahmed (wk)
- Shahzaib Hasan
- Sohail Khan
- Sheharyar Ghani
- Tanvir Ahmed
- Tariq Haroon

Rawalpindi Rams

- Sohail Tanvir (c)
- Umar Amin
- Adnan Mufti
- Awais Zia
- Babar Naeem
- Hammad Azam
- Jamal Anwar (wk)
- Mohammad Ayaz
- Mohammad Nawaz
- Mohammad Rameez
- Nasir Malik
- Naved Malik
- Samiullah
- Tahir Rauf
- Umair Mushtaq
- Yasim Murtaza
- Yasir Arafat
- Zahid Mansoor

Mohammad Sami replaced Shahid Afridi as Karachi Dolphins captain.

== Results ==
=== Teams and standings ===
Group A
Team	Pld	W	L	NR	Pts	NRR
Lahore Lions	3	3	0	0	6	+1.660
Peshawar Panthers	3	1	2	0	2	−0.084
Karachi Zebras	3	1	2	0	2	−0.536
Faisalabad Wolves	3	1	2	0	2	−1.057

Group B
Team	Pld	W	L	NR	Pts	NRR
Sialkot Stallions	3	3	0	0	6	+1.362
Karachi Dolphins	3	2	1	0	4	+0.245
Lahore Eagles	3	1	2	0	2	+0.165
Rawalpindi Rams	3	0	3	0	0	−1.780

Qualified for semifinals
Full table on ESPNCricinfo

== Fixtures ==
All match times in Pakistan Standard Time (UTC+5:30).

=== Group stage ===
==== Group A ====
25 March 2012
16:00 (D/N)
Scorecard

Peshawar Panthers; 127/8 (20 overs)	v	Faisalabad Wolves; 128/8 (19.5 overs)
Mohammad Fayyaz 23(30); Hasan Mahmood 3/11 (4 overs)		Ali Waqas 43(49); Mohammad Aslam 2/31 (4 overs)

Faisalabad Wolves won by 2 wickets
Rawalpindi Cricket Stadium, Rawalpindi
Umpires: Ijaz Ahmed and Masood Khan
Player of the match: Ali Waqas (Faisalabad Wolves)

- Peshawar Panthers won the toss and chose to Bat

25 March 2012
20:00 (D/N)
Scorecard

Karachi Zebras; 135/5 (20 overs)	v	Lahore Lions; 136/4 (17.5 overs)
Rameez Aziz 37(32); Sohail Ahmed 1/17 (3 overs)		Ahmed Shehzad 61*(52); Anwar Ali 1/24 (4 overs)

Lahore Lions won by 6 wickets
Rawalpindi Cricket Stadium, Rawalpindi
Umpires: Jamil Kamran and Nadeem Iqbal
Player of the match: Ahmed Shehzad (Lahore Lions)

- Karachi Zebras won the toss and chose to bat

27 March 2012
16:00 (D/N)
Scorecard

Faisalabad Wolves; 119/8 (20 overs)	v	Karachi Zebras; 120/2 (17.5 overs)
Ali Waqas 29(25); Anwar Ali 3/23 (4 overs)		Khurram Manzoor 54*(49); Waqas Maqsood 2/28 (4 overs)

Karachi Zebras won by 8 wickets
Rawalpindi Cricket Stadium, Rawalpindi
Umpires: Ehtesham-ul-Haq and Hakeem Shah
Player of the match: Anwar Ali and Khurram Manzoor (Karachi Zebras)

- Faisalabad Wolves won the toss and chose to bat
- Twenty20 debut: Mohammad Hasan (Karachi Zebras)

27 March 2012
20:00 (D/N)
Scorecard

Lahore Lions; 113 (20 overs)	v	Peshawar Panthers; 79 (19.3 overs)
Abdul Razzaq 37 (48); Umar Gul 3/16 (4 overs)		Zohaib Khan 22 (29); Wahab Riaz 3/9 (4 overs)

Lahore Lions won by 34 runs
Rawalpindi Cricket Stadium, Rawalpindi
Umpires: Akbar Khan and Kamal Merchant
Player of the match: Raza Ali Dar (Lahore Lions) and Wahab Riaz (Lahore Lions)

- Lahore Lions won the toss and chose to bat

29 March 2012
16:00
Scorecard

Peshawar Panthers; 158/5 (20 overs)	v	Karachi Zebras; 127/7 (20 overs)
Iftikhar Ahmed 77(56); Anwar Ali 2/28 (4 overs)		Faisal Iqbal 40(38); Riaz Afridi 4/15 (4 overs)

Peshawar Panthers won by 31 runs
Rawalpindi Cricket Stadium, Rawalpindi
Umpires: Shozab Raza and Tahir Shah
Player of the match: Iftikhar Ahmed (Peshawar Panthers)

- Peshawar Panthers won the toss and chose to bat

29 March 2012
20:00 (D/N)
Scorecard

Lahore Lions; 194/3 (20 overs)	v	Faisalabad Wolves; 146/9 (20 overs)
Umar Akmal 57*(37); Saeed Ajmal 1/41 (4 overs)		Asif Hussain 64(51); Zia-ul-Haq 5/23 (4 overs)

Lahore Lions won by 48 runs
Rawalpindi Cricket Stadium, Rawalpindi
Umpires: Kaukab Butt and Riazuddin
Player of the match: Umar Akmal (Lahore Lions) and Zia-ul-Haq (Lahore Lions)

- Lahore Lions won the toss and chose to bat
- Twenty20 debuts: Jahandad Khan (Faisalabad Wolves); Fahad-ul-Haq and Zia-ul-Haq (Lahore Lions)

==== Group B ====
26 March 2012
16:00 (D/N)
Scorecard

Lahore Eagles; 129/8 (20 overs)	v	Sialkot Stallions; 132/5 (19 overs)
Saad Nasim 27*(18); Bilawal Bhatti 3/33 (4 over)		Shakeel Ansar 32 (35); Saad Nasim 2/29 (4overs)

Sialkot Stallions won by 5 wickets
Rawalpindi Cricket Stadium, Rawalpindi
Umpires: Iqbal Butt and Mir Dad
Player of the match: Shahid Yousuf (Sialkot Stallions)

- Sialkot Stallions won the toss and elected to field.
- Twenty20 debut: Bilawal Bhatti (Sialkot Stallions)

26 March 2012
20:00 (D/N)
Scorecard

Karachi Dolphins; 171/4 (20 overs)	v	Rawalpindi Rams; 139 all out (18.3 overs)
Khalid Latif 88 (61); Yasir Arafat 2/30 (4 overs)		Naved Malik 59 (42); Faraz Ahmed 3/20 (20 overs)

Karachi Dolphins won by 32 runs
Rawalpindi Cricket Stadium, Rawalpindi
Umpires: Raweed Khan and Qaiser Waheed
Player of the match: Khalid Latif (Karachi Dolphins)

- Rawalpindi Rams won the toss and elected to field.

28 March 2012
16:00 (D/N)
Scorecard

Karachi Dolphins; 123/9 (20 overs)	v	Sialkot Stallions; 127/1 (16.1 overs)
Shahzaib Hasan 30(30); Shoaib Malik 5/29 (4 overs)		Imran Nazir 76*(47); Mohammad Sami 0/17 (4 overs)

Sialkot Stallions won by 9 wickets
Rawalpindi Cricket Stadium, Rawalpindi
Umpires: Anis-ur-Rehman and Ghaffar Kazmi
Player of the match: Shoaib Malik (Sialkot Stallions)

- Karachi Dolphins won the toss and elected to bat

28 March 2012
20:00 (D/N)
Scorecard

Lahore Eagles; 158 (20 overs)	v	Rawalpindi Rams; 124 (17.5 overs)
Taufeeq Umar 76(57); Sohail Tanvir 3/28 (4 overs)		Awais Zia 55(40); Junaid Zia 3/14 (4 overs)

Lahore Eagles won by 34 runs
Rawalpindi Cricket Stadium, Rawalpindi
Umpires: Islam Khan and Khalid Mahmood
Player of the match: Taufeeq Umar (Lahore Eagles)

- Lahore Eagles won the toss and elected to bat.
- Twenty20 debut: Muzaffar Mahboob (Lahore Eagles)

30 March 2012
16:00
Scorecard

Lahore Eagles; 148/8 (20 overs)	v	Karachi Dolphins; 149/5 (18.1 overs)
Imran Farhat 41 (31); Haaris Ayaz 2/25 (4 overs)		Asad Shafiq 58 (47); Mustafa Iqbal 3/26 (4 overs)

Karachi Dolphins won by 5 wickets
Rawalpindi Cricket Stadium, Rawalpindi
Umpires: Ahmed Shahab and Nadeem Ghauri
Player of the match: Asad Shafiq (Karachi Dolphins)

- Karachi Dolphins won the toss and elected to field.

30 March 2012
20:00 (D/N)
Scorecard

Rawalpindi Rams; 121/9 (20 overs)	v	Sialkot Stallions; 125/3 (15.3 overs)
Hammad Azam 24 (36); Sohail Tanvir 24 (22); Raza Hasan 3/20 (4 overs)		Imran Nazir 59 (34); Mohammad Nawaz 2/28 (4 overs)

Sialkot Stallions won by 7 wickets
Rawalpindi Cricket Stadium, Rawalpindi
Umpires: Saleem Badar and Shakeel Khan
Player of the match: Imran Nazir (Sialkot Stallions)

- Rawalpindi Rams won the toss and elected to bat.
- Twenty20 debut: Umair Mushtaq (Rawalpindi Rams)

=== Knockout stage ===
Semifinals
A1	Lahore Lions	167/7
B2	Karachi Dolphins	170/3
B1	Sialkot Stallions	197/1
A2	Peshawar Panthers	157/8

Finals
B2	Karachi Dolphins	167/8
B1	Sialkot Stallions	170/2

Semi-finals

31 March 2012 (D/N)
Scorecard

Lahore Lions; 167/7 (20 overs)	v	Karachi Dolphins; 170/3 (19 overs)
Kashif Siddiq 48 (35); Faraz Ahmed 2/37 (4 overs)		Shahzaib Hasan 57 (28); Adnan Rasool 2/29 (4 overs)

Karachi Dolphins won by 7 wickets (with 6 balls remaining)
Rawalpindi Cricket Stadium, Rawalpindi
Umpires: Ahsan Raza and Shozab Raza
Player of the match: Shahzaib Hasan (Karachi Dolphins)

- Lahore Lions won the toss and chose to bat.

31 March 2012 (D/N)
Scorecard

Sialkot Stallions; 197/1 (20 overs)	v	Peshawar Panthers; 157/8 (20 overs)
Shakeel Ansar 100* (67); Mohammad Aslam 1/34 (4 overs)		Gauhar Ali 68 (53); Abdur Rehman 3/17 (4 overs)

Sialkot Stallions won by 40 runs
Rawalpindi Cricket Stadium, Rawalpindi
Umpires: Saleem Badar and Zameer Haider
Player of the match: Shakeel Ansar (Sialkot Stallions)

- Sialkot Stallions won the toss and elected to bat.

Final

1 April 2012 (D/N)
Scorecard

Karachi Dolphins; 167/8 (20 overs)	v	Sialkot Stallions; 170/2 (18.5 overs)
Khalid Latif 81* (59); Raza Hasan 4/33 (4 overs)		Shoaib Malik 62* (42); Faraz Ahmed 1/37 (4 overs)

Sialkot Stallions won by 8 wickets (with 7 balls remainings)
Rawalpindi Cricket Stadium, Rawalpindi
Attendance: 25,000
Umpires: Ahsan Raza and Zameer Haider
Player of the match: Shoaib Malik (Sialkot Stallions)

- Karachi Dolphins won the toss and elected to bat.

Karachi Dolphins won the toss and elected to bat, and the decision seemed to have paid off when they powered past 60 in the Powerplay. Their batting was led by opener Khalid Latif, who carried his bat through the innings to finish with 81 off 59. The main support was provided by Shahzaib Hasan and Asad Shafiq, who scored 30 and 38, respectively. They made 167 for 8 in 20 overs. Raza Hasan's 4 wickets came for 33 runs.

Chasing 168, Sialkot Stallions lost Shakeel Ansar early but took control thereafter. Imran Nazir scored a rapid 41 (20 balls), before an unbroken stand of 119 at close to nine an over between Shoaib Malik (62) and Haris Sohail (55) sealed the game in the 19th over.

For the final, 20,000-odd people thronged the Rawalpindi Cricket Stadium, with its newly renovated stands. There were a further 15,000 fans outside the stadium, doing their best to catch glimpses of the action.

== Statistics ==
Leading run scorers
Player	Team	Matches	Runs
Khalid Latif	Karachi Dolphins	5	243
Imran Nazir	Sialkot Stallions	5	191
Haris Sohail	Sialkot Stallions	4	173
Asad Shafiq	Karachi Dolphins	5	110
Shakeel Ansar	Sialkot Stallions	5	162

Leading wicket takers
Player	Team	Matches	Wickets
Raza Hasan	Sialkot Stallions	5	12
Shoaib Malik	Sialkot Stallions	5	7
Faraz Ahmed	Karachi Dolphins	5	7
Mustafa Iqbal	Lahore Eagles	3	6
Anwar Ali	Lahore Lions	3	6
