= Super 8 Twenty20 Cup =

Cricket tournament in Pakistan

Haier Super-8 T20 Cup
- Countries: Pakistan
- Administrator: Pakistan Cricket Board
- Format: Twenty20
- First edition: 2011
- Tournament format: Round-robin and knockout
- Number of teams: 8
- Current champion: Sialkot Stallions (2nd title)
- Most successful: Sialkot Stallions (2)
- Qualification: Champions League T20
- TV: PTV Sports

The Haier Super 8 T20 Cup was the top-tier domestic Twenty20 cricket league in Pakistan from 2011 to 2015. The top 8 teams from the National T20 Cup qualified for the tournament. However, it was made defunct with the initiation of the Pakistan Super League in 2016, which currently features 6 city-based franchises from within Pakistan and is independent of the National T20 Cup.

== Teams ==
Team	Province	Debut season	Last season	Captain	Coach
Rawalpindi Rams	Punjab	2011	2015	Sohail Tanvir	Sabih Azhar
Sialkot Stallions	Punjab	2011	2015	Shoaib Malik	Ijaz Ahmed jnr
Lahore Lions	Punjab	2011	2015	Kamran Akmal	Mohsin Kamal
Karachi Dolphins	Sindh	2011	2015	Sarfraz Ahmed	Tauseef Ahmed
Faisalabad Wolves	Punjab	2011	2015	Misbah-ul-Haq	Naveed Anjum
Hyderabad Hawks	Sindh	2011	2015	Sharjeel Khan	Shaukat Mirza
Islamabad Leopards	Islamabad	2011	2015	Zohaib Ahmed	Taimoor Azam
Multan Tigers	Punjab	2011	2015	Saeed Anwar Jr	Manzoor Elahi
Peshawar Panthers	Khyber Pakhtunkhwa	2012	2015	Akbar Badshah	Abdur Rehman
Karachi Zebras	Sindh	2012	2012	Faisal Iqbal	Azam Khan
Lahore Eagles	Punjab	2012	2012	Imran Farhat	Manzoor Elahi
Abbottabad Falcons	Khyber Pakhtunkhwa	2013	2015	Younus Khan	Sajjad Akbar
Bahawalpur Stags	Punjab	2013	2013	Imranullah Aslam	Shahid Anwar

== Results ==
Year	Host	Winners	Result	Runners-up	Attendance
2011; Details	Iqbal Stadium, Faisalabad	Rawalpindi Rams; 164 all out (20 overs)	Won by Super Over; Scorecard	Karachi Dolphins; 164 for 5 (20 overs)	24,610
2012; Details	Rawalpindi Cricket Stadium, Rawalpindi	Sialkot Stallions; 170 for 2 (18.5 overs)	Won by 8 wickets Scorecard	Karachi Dolphins; 167 for 8 (20 overs)	25,000
2013; Details	Gaddafi Stadium, Lahore	Faisalabad Wolves; 158 for 3 (20 overs)	Won by 36 runs Scorecard	Sialkot Stallions; 122 all out (19.1 overs)	43,614
2015; Details	Iqbal Stadium, Faisalabad	Sialkot Stallions; 197 for 9 (20 overs)	Won by 74 runs Scorecard	Lahore Lions; 123 for 8 (20 overs)	25,000

== See also ==
- List of domestic Twenty20 cricket competitions
