= Rawalpindi Rams =

Former cricket team based in Rawalpindi, Pakistan

Rawalpindi Rams راولپنڈی ریمز
Personnel
- Owner: Rawalpindi Region

Team information
- Colors
- Founded: 2004
- Dissolved: 2016
- Home ground: Rawalpindi Cricket Stadium
- Capacity: 15,000

History
- National T20 Cup wins: 0
- Super-8 T20 Cup wins: 1 (2011)

The Rawalpindi Rams (Urdu: راولپنڈی ریمز) was a domestic Twenty20 and List A cricket team, based in Rawalpindi, Punjab, Pakistan. The team was established in 2004–2005 and operated until its dissolution in 2016. Its home ground was the Rawalpindi Cricket Stadium.

== History ==
- In the 2004–05 National Twenty20 Cup, the Rawalpindi Rams participated with players from Rawalpindi, Islamabad and Azad Kashmir.
- Before the 2005–06 National Twenty20 Cup, the Rawalpindi Rams were divided into 2 teams;
1. Rawalpindi Rams - Containing players from Rawalpindi
2. Islamabad Leopards - Containing players from Islamabad and Azad Kashmir

== Honours ==
Year	National T20 Cup
2004/05	Group stage
2005/06	Group stage
2006/07	Group stage
2008/09	Group stage
2009	Group stage
2009/10	Group stage
2010/11	Semi-Finalists
2011/12	Runners-Up
2012/13	Group stage
2013/14	Group stage
2014/15	Group stage

Year	Super-8 T20 Cup
2011	Champions
2012	Group stage
2013	Semi-Finalists
2015	Semi-Finalists

== Performance in domestic competitions ==
=== 2008–09 RBS T20 Cup ===
The tournament started off with a scare for the Rams as the Quetta Bears had them on the ropes at 59–5 but the allrounder-wicketkeeper duo of Yasir Arafat and Jamal Anwar successfully revived the scoreboard and set a challenging total of 143 for victory. The score would prove more than enough for the Bears as they succumbed to the seam bowling attack of the Rams with just 67 on the board.

Following that comfortable victory, however, they lost to Lahore Lions in a crucial fixture at the Gaddafi Stadium. Pursuing 172 for victory, the Rams were all-out for 150 largely because of the handy contributions for the Lions by the left-arm spinner, Sohail Ahmad, who scored an invaluable 24 with the bat and then came back to take 4–13 to end the Rams' chances of qualifying for the semis.

Umar Amin was the most productive run-scorer for the Rawalpindi Rams, scoring 72 runs from the two games with a half century under his belt. Pakistan's future fast-bowling star Mohammad Aamer also turned a few heads at the initial stages of the tournament with 5 wickets at exactly 3.25 runs per over.

=== 2009–10 RBS T20 Cup ===
In the 2009 edition of the domestic tournament, the Rams faltered again at the group stages like the other nine knocked out teams.

Their initial group clash with Karachi Zebras ended up with a nervy 11-run victory but they couldn't rise up to the big occasion and suffered a knockout defeat at the hands of the eventual champions Sialkot Stallions in the following game due to a 57-ball-95 from the domestically seasoned allrounder Naved-ul-Hasan. The Rams could only muster 180 from the 198 required for victory despite a late surge from Hammad Azam.

The top run-getter for the club was Tahir Mughal who racked up 92 runs at an impressive average of 46. Among the bowlers, 17-year-old spinner Raza Hasan impressed with returns of 4–64 in the two games combined.

=== 2010–11 Faysal Bank T20 Cup ===
The 2010 Domestic T20 Cup was by far the most illustrious for the club. They defeated the five-time champions Sialkot Stallions, who lost to any team for the first time in as many years. They came with intent in the high-scoring clash at the Gaddafi Stadium with the opening duo of Awais Zia and Naved Malik scoring at a fast pace. With the Rams going at over 14 runs per over, a huge total was on the cards but the 'Pindi batsman couldn't capitalize on the solid start and ended up at getting 191. In reply, Imran Nazir provided the Stallions with just the initial boost required, scoring 45 from 15 balls, making the target of 192 look achievable but thanks to the bowling efforts of Yasim Murtaza, Hammad Azam and Sohail Tanvir, a flurry of late wickets ensured that the Stallions would sit out of the finals for the first time since 2005.

Before this game though, the Rams had got the better of Karachi Zebras by 28 runs in their opening group clash.

Afterwards, they had to get past Shahid Afridi's Karachi Dolphins to reach the finals. After being called in to bat, the Rams scored 209 runs in a mosquito-infested first innings which saw the proceeding being called off twice. However, the target got chased down with more than an over to spare as Sohail Tanvir's death bowling wavered under pressure, along with the Rams' overall fielding. Shahzaib Hasan, Fawad Alam and Shahid Afridi's innings contributed to the Dolphins' victory.

Naved Ashraf was the most productive batsman for the Rams in the tournament, scoring 101 runs at an average in excess of 30. While among the bowlers, all-rounder Hammad Azam topped the charts with 8 scalps at 11.1 runs per over.

Despite putting up a satisfactory performance, Rams' success on the ground was overshadowed by allegations of spot-fixing from the PCB. The Pakistan Cricket Board announced that an all-rounder (most probably Sohail Tanvir) that played for the Rawalpindi Rams was being investigated for match-fixing. It is suspected that the player was being paid to play dot balls and bowl loose deliveries. This meant that the Karachi Dolphins successfully chased down 209 runs within 20 overs The PCB announced that another match was also being investigated for fixing.

=== 2011 Faysal Bank Super 8 T20 Cup ===
PCB, for the first time, introduced a side tournament to the National T20 cup. Qualification in this tournament was based on a relegation system and the five lowest ranked teams in the previous year's edition of the Faysal Bank T20 Cup (Quetta Bears, Karachi Zebras, Lahore Eagles, Abbottabad Falcons and Peshawar Panthers) were left out to set up a Super 8 T20 Cup in which eight teams were divided into two groups of four with top two teams from each group setting up semi-final matches with each other.

Rawalpindi Rams started this tournament on a low note with a defeat at the hands of Karachi Dolphins which left them in a do-or-die situation to win their remnant group games or sit out of the semi-final. Chasing a modest score of 146, the Rams lost both their opening batsmen to Tanvir Ahmad's medium pacers with a paltry 33 on board. Subsequent, tight overs from the Karachi spinners ensured that the Rams never really recovered from the early blows and thus cascaded to 136 all out.

In their second group game Rawalpindi Rams took on the home team Faisalabad Wolves in a jam-packed Iqbal Stadium. The Wolves went in first and gave the Rams a quite chase-able total of 141 but Pakistan National Cricket Team veteran, Mohammad Hafeez had other ideas as he triggered a drastic collapse with his off breaks. Rams were once cruising along at 90–0 but then in a matter of minutes were reduced to 120–6 giving the Wolves a sniff of a surprise victory in front of the home crowd. All such possibilities were shut out by the Rams' wicket-keeper batsman Jamal Anwar who struck 19 from 6 deliveries, included 3 fours & a six to bring the matter to a close.

In their third and final group game, Rawalpindi Rams easily got past an off-color Multan Tigers side. The pursuit of a 129-run target on a batting friendly wicket wasn't much of a test for Pindi's batting lineup and they got there with 7 wickets and 5.3 overs to spare, thanks mostly to the left arm spin bowling of Raza Hasan (4 for 21 in his 4 overs).

Rawalpindi Rams made their first ever appearance in a domestic T20 Cup Final by defeating a star-studded Lahore Lions in an anti-climax of a semi-final. Rams set up a competitive score of 186 in a pressure game thanks to Jamal Anwar's (67 runs off 48 balls including 6 fours & 3 sixes) and Sohail Tanvir's (60* off 44 balls including 5 fours & 3 sixes) fourth wicket stand of 111 from 68 balls. In reply the Lions were reduced to 88–8 in 13.2 but a late cameo from Adnan Rasool (41* off 24 balls) restored some parity to the Lions score but they were still left needing 50 runs from the last bowl of the game.

On Friday, July 1, 2011, history was written for the Rawalpindi Rams as they beat a strong Karachi Dolphins side in a nerve wrecking finale at a sold-out Iqbal Stadium. The Dolphins were coming back from defeating 5-time champions Sialkot Stallions in the other semi-final and were hot favorites to win the Cup but some tight bowling from the Rams' bowlers especially, slow left armer Samiullah (4 overs for 19 runs), put a cap on Dolphins's batting lineup and kept them to a par score of 164 in the allotted 20 overs. In reply the Rams' openers started off in a typically fast style and were going at almost 10 runs-per-over, however the Dolphins fast-bowler, Sohail Khan took two wickets in an over to stun the Rams. In Sohail's next over seasoned Rams opener, Awais Zia, struck four consecutive boundaries and restarted Rams' quick advance towards the target but as so often is the case in cricket the bowler has the last laugh and Sohail ended up stopping the Awais Zia thanks to a superb fielding effort from Haaris Ayaz at mid-wicket who dived full length and pouched the catch with one hand. The match continued to see-saw both ways before it fittingly ended up as a tie and a Super Over was called in to provide the final ruling.

The best bowler of the tournament was pitted against Awais Zia in the first of the two super overs (one per team). Awais scored 16 runs, including a flat six over midwicket, to give Karachi a challenging total of 17 to win from their 6 legitimate balls. In reply, Khalid Latif struck the very first bowl from left-arm spinner, Raza Hasan, straight back over his head for a six before falling the next ball. Dolphins could add only a single run to their total as Raza finished his over with an arm ball that gave Rawalpindi Rams their first ever domestic T20 title.

Wicket-keeper batsman Jamal Anwar was the most successful run-getter for the Rams (7th overall) in this edition of the tournament with 131 runs at an average of 43.6. While Raza Hasan was the second most potent bowler in this tournament (after Sohail Khan) with 11 wickets at 6.2 runs per over.

== Result summary ==
=== T20 results ===
Summary of results by season
	Played	Wins	Losses	Tie	No Result	% Win
(Pakistan) T20 Cup 2004/05	2	1	1	0	0	50.00%
(Pakistan) T20 Cup 2005/06	6	1	5	0	0	16.87%
(Pakistan) T20 Cup 2006/07	2	1	1	0	0	50.00%
(Pakistan) T20 Cup 2008/09	2	1	1	0	0	50.00%
(Pakistan) T20 Cup 2009	3	1	2	0	0	33.33%
(Pakistan) T20 Cup 2009/10	2	1	1	0	0	50.00%
(Pakistan) T20 Cup 2010/11	3	2	1	0	0	66.67%
(Pakistan) Super 8 2011	5	3	1	1	0	70.00%
(Pakistan) T20 Cup 2011/12	5	4	1	0	0	80.00%
(Pakistan) Super 8 2012	3	0	3	0	0	00.00%
(Pakistan) T20 Cup 2012/13	6	4	2	0	0	66.67%
(Pakistan) Super 8 2013	4	2	1	1	0	62.50%
(Pakistan) T20 Cup 2013/14	3	1	2	0	0	33.33%
(Pakistan) T20 Cup 2014/15	3	2	1	0	0	66.67%
(Pakistan) Super 8 2015	4	2	2	0	0	50.00%
Total	53	26	25	2	0	50.94%

Results by opposition
	Played	Wins	Losses	Tie	No Result	% Win
(Pakistan) (Afghanistan) Afghan Cheetahs	1	1	0	0	0	100.00%
(Pakistan) Bahawalpur Stags	2	1	1	0	0	100.00%
(Pakistan) Faisalabad Wolves	7	2	4	1	0	35.71%
(Pakistan) FATA Cheetas	1	1	0	0	0	100.00%
(Pakistan) Hyderabad Hawks	1	1	0	0	0	100.00%
(Pakistan) Karachi Dolphins	6	2	3	1	0	41.66%
(Pakistan) Karachi Zebras	5	3	2	0	0	60.00%
(Pakistan) Lahore Eagles	3	1	2	0	0	33.33%
(Pakistan) Lahore Lions	5	1	4	0	0	20.00%
(Pakistan) Multan Tigers	5	3	2	0	0	60.00%
(Pakistan) Peshawar Panthers	4	2	2	0	0	50.00%
(Pakistan) Quetta Bears	4	4	0	0	0	100.00%
(Pakistan) Sialkot Stallions	7	2	5	0	0	28.57%
Total	53	26	25	2	0	50.94%

== Records ==
The following are some verified records of the club.

=== Batting ===
- Most Runs: 889, Naved Maliik (2006–Present)
- Highest Individual Score: 86*, Mohammad Wasim, vs Quetta Bears (22 December 2006)
- Highest Partnership for any Wicket: 135, Awais Zia & Naved Maliik, vs Lahore Eagles (6 December 2012)
- Highest Total: 209–6, vs Karachi Dolphins, (15 October 2010)
- Lowest Total: 105–10, vs Faisalabad Wolves, (2 March 2006)

=== Bowling ===
- Most Wickets: 44, Sohail Tanvir (2005–Present)
- Best Individual Bowling Figures: 5–23, Shoaib Akhtar, vs Quetta Bears (25 April 2005)
- Best Economy Rate: 6.90, Raza Hasan (2010–2011) - (40 overs minimum)

=== Fielding and wicket-keeping ===
- Most Dismissals as WK: 35, Jamal Anwar (2008–Present)
- Most Catches as Fielder: 14, Awais Zia (2008–Present)

=== Miscellaneous ===
- Most Matches Played: 43, Sohail Tanvir (2005–Present)
- Biggest Victories by Runs: 96 Runs, vs Quetta Bears (25 April 2005)
- Smallest Victory by Runs: 5 Runs, vs Karachi Dolphins (2 December 2012)
- Largest Victory by Wickets: 9 wickets, vs Quetta Bears (27 May 2009)

Player	Span	Match	Won	Lost	Tied	NR	%
(Pakistan) Shoaib Akhtar	2005-2005	2	1	1	0	0	50.00
(Pakistan) Naved Ashraf	2006–2010	10	3	7	0	0	30.00
(Pakistan) Mohammad Wasim	2006-2006	2	1	1	0	0	50.00
(Pakistan) Sohail Tanvir	2009–Present	28	14	12	2	0	53.57
(Pakistan) Yasir Arafat	2010-2010	3	2	1	0	0	66.66

== Notable players ==
- Awais Zia
- Sohail Tanvir
- Umar Amin
- Naved Malik
- Jamal Anwar
- Hammad Azam
- Yasir Arafat
- Mohammad Amir
- Hamza Ali

== See also ==
- Pakistan National Cricket Team
- Pakistan Super League
- Faysal Bank T20 Cup
- Faysal Bank Super Eight T20 Cup
