= Lahore Lions =

Domestic cricket team

- لاہور لائنز لہور لائنز

Personnel
- Captain: (Pakistan) Kamran Akmal
- Coach: (Pakistan) Mohsin Kamal
- Owner: LRCA PCB
- Manager: Shafiq Ahmed

Team information
- City: Lahore, Punjab, Pakistan
- Colours
- Founded: 2004
- Dissolved: 2016
- Home ground: LCCA Ground Gaddafi Stadium
- Capacity: 62,250

History
- Haier T20 Cup wins: 3 (2010), (2012), (2013)
- CLT20 wins: 0
- Official website: lahorelions.pcb.com.pk

Lahore Lions (Urdu: لاہور لائنز, Punjabi: لہور لائنز abbreviated as LIO) was a Pakistani franchise cricket team representing the city of Lahore and was one of the 19 teams on the country's domestic cricket. The team was established by Lahore Regional Cricket Association in 2004/05 at Lahore City Cricket Association Ground, one of its two home grounds. Domestically, the team played in the Haier T20 Cup. The team won its first title in 2010 where they defeated Karachi Dolphins by 37 runs at their other home ground, Gaddafi Stadium.

== History ==
Lahore Lions are the most successful Twenty20 team in the history of the Lahore Regional Cricket Association, and the second most successful in the country after the Sialkot Stallions. The team won the T20 Cup 2010/11 under the captaincy of Shoaib Iqbal Joiya and qualified for the inaugural Super-8 T20 Cup. Lahore Lions won the 2013–14 season and qualified for the Champions League T20.

== 2014–15 squad ==
No.	Name	Nat	Birth date	Batting style	Bowling style	Notes
Batsmen
23	Nasir Jamshed	(Pakistan)	6 December 1989 (age 35)	Left-handed		
78	Ahmed Shehzad	(Pakistan)	23 November 1991 (age 33)	Right-handed	Right-arm legbreak	
79	Umar Siddiq	(Pakistan)	30 December 1992 (age 32)	Left-handed	Right-arm off break	
All-rounders
80	Agha Salman	(Pakistan)	23 November 1993 (age 31)	Right-handed	Right-arm off break	
81	Mohammad Hafeez	(Pakistan)	7 October 1980 (age 44)	Right-handed	Right-arm off spin	Vice Captain
82	Shoaib Iqbal	(Pakistan)	15 March 1996 (age 29)	Right-handed	Right-arm legbreak	
Wicket-keepers
83	Umar Akmal	(Pakistan)	26 May 1990 (age 35)	Right-handed		part-time spinner
84	Kamran Akmal	(Pakistan)	26 May 1985 (age 40)	Right-handed		Captain
Bowlers
99	Asif Raza	(Pakistan)	11 January 1987 (age 38)	Left-handed	Right-arm fast medium	
100	Wahab Riaz	(Pakistan)	28 June 1985 (age 40)	Right-handed	Left-arm fast	
23	Aizaz Cheema	(Pakistan)	11 January 1987 (age 38)	Right-handed	Right-arm fast medium	
24	Imran Ali	(Pakistan)	21 October 1980 (age 44)	Right-handed	Right-arm fast medium	
08	Adnan Rasool	(Pakistan)	1 May 1981 (age 44)	Right-handed	Right-arm off spin	
87	Mustafa Iqbal	(Pakistan)	30 August 1989 (age 36)	Left-handed	Left-arm orthodox	
88	Mohammad Saeed	(Pakistan)	12 October 1983 (age 41)	Right-handed	Right-arm fast medium	
78	Ali Manzoor	(Pakistan)	1 August 1993 (age 32)	Right-handed	Left-arm orthodox	

== Former notable players ==
- Muhammad Yousuf
- Abdul Razzaq
- Imran Farhat (Now, plays for Lahore Eagles)
- Imran Tahir (Now, plays for Highveld Lions, South Africa)
- Salman Butt
- Kamran Akmal (Plays Sometimes for Lahore Eagles and sometimes for Lahore Lions)
- Azhar Ali (Plays Sometimes for Lahore Eagles and sometimes for Lahore Lions)
- Taufeeq Umar (Now, plays for Lahore Eagles)

== Honours ==
Season	Haier T20 Cup	Super 8 T20 Cup	Champions League T20
2004/05	Group stage	–	–
2005/06	Semi-Finalists	–	–
2006/07	Semi-Finalists	–	–
2008/09	Semi-Finalists	–	DNQ
2009	Runners-up	–	DNQ
2009/10	Semi-Finalists	–	DNQ
2010/11	Champions	Semi-Finalists	DNQ
2011/12	Group stage	Semi-Finalists	DNQ
2012/13	Champions	Semi-Finalists	DNQ
2013/14	Champions	Did Not Held	Group stage
2014/15	Runners-up	Qualified	–

- DNQ = Did not qualify

== Fixtures and results ==
=== T20 results ===
Summary of results by tournaments
	Played	Wins	Losses	Tied	% Win
(Pakistan) T20 Cup 2004/05	2	1	1	0	50.00%
(Pakistan) T20 Cup 2005/06	6	5	1	0	83.33%
(Pakistan) T20 Cup 2006/07	3	2	1	0	66.67%
(Pakistan) T20 Cup 2008/09	3	2	1	0	66.67%
(Pakistan) T20 Cup 2009	5	4	1	0	80.00%
(Pakistan) T20 Cup 2009/10	4	3	1	0	75.00%
(Pakistan) T20 Cup 2010/11	5	5	0	0	100.00%
(Pakistan) Super 8 2011	4	3	1	0	75.00%
(Pakistan) T20 Cup 2011/12	2	1	1	0	50.00%
(Pakistan) Super 8 2012	4	3	1	0	75.00%
(Pakistan) T20 Cup 2012/13	8	8	0	0	100.00%
(Pakistan) Super 8 2013	4	3	1	0	75.00%
(Pakistan) T20 Cup 2013/14	6	5	1	0	83.33%
(India) (South Africa) (Australia) CLT20 2014	6	3	3	0	50.00%
(Pakistan) T20 Cup 2014/15	5	3	2	0	60.00%
Total	67	51	16	0	76.11%

=== By Opposition ===
Opposition	Played	Wins	Losses	Tied	% Win
Domestic
(Pakistan) Abbottabad Falcons	6	5	1	0	83.33%
(Pakistan) Bahawalpur Stags	3	2	1	0	66.66%
(Pakistan) DM JAMALI Ibexes	2	2	0	0	100.00%
(Pakistan) Faisalabad Wolves	7	4	3	0	57.14%
(Pakistan) Hyderabad Hawks	4	4	0	0	100.00%
(Pakistan) Islamabad Leopards	6	6	0	0	100.00%
(Pakistan) Karachi Dolphins	4	2	2	0	50.00%
(Pakistan) Karachi Zebras	2	2	0	0	100.00%
(Pakistan) Lahore Eagles	0	0	0	0	–
(Pakistan) Multan Tigers	6	6	0	0	100.00%
(Pakistan) Peshawar Panthers	4	3	1	0	75.00%
(Pakistan) Quetta Bears	6	6	0	0	100.00%
(Pakistan) Rawalpindi Rams	4	3	1	0	75.00%
(Pakistan) Sialkot Stallions	7	3	4	0	42.85%
International
(South Africa) Sunfoil Dolphins	1	1	0	0	100.00%
(India) Kolkata Knight Riders	1	0	1	0	00.00%
(India) Mumbai Indians	1	1	0	0	100.00%
(New Zealand) Northern Knights	1	0	1	0	00.00%
(Australia) Perth Scorchers	1	0	1	0	00.00%
(Sri Lanka) Southern Express	1	1	0	0	100.00%
Total	67	51	16	0	76.11%

=== CLT20 2014 season ===
Lahore Lions qualified first time for the Champions League Twenty20, becoming the third Pakistani team overall to participate in the tournament since its inception. Abdul Razzaq was not included in the squad as Pakistan Cricket Board rejected Muhammad Hafeez's request to add him. The squad contained the following players: Mohammed Hafeez(c), Ahmad Shahzad, Umar Siddique Khan, Muhammad Umar Akmal, Nasir Jamshaid, Muhammad Salman Ali, Asif Raza, Muhammad Mustafa Iqbal, Wahab Riaz, Aizaz Bin Ilyas Cheema, Imran Ali, Saad Naseem, Adnan Rasool, Muhammad Saeed and Ali Manzoor.
The team defeated 2013 Champions Mumbai Indians and Southern Express of Sri Lanka to qualify for the main event. After a washout in their game against Chennai Super Kings, they defeated Dolphins of South Africa. But Lahore Lions played their last match against Perth Scorchers and lost it match which made them out of tournament. The captain Muhammad Hafeez was satisfied with the team for their exceptional performance in the event, he said: "I think our team's performance in the face of limited resources was remarkable. Unlike other big teams, we didn't have batting, bowling or fielding coaches with us, but we still managed to fight well. We learned a lot from the CLT20 and it's great for young domestic players to come and perform at such a big stage.”
PCB decided to hold the domestic T20 competition in Pakistan on the same dates as the Champions League. This meant that a second Lahore Lions team played in the Pakistani tournament and the main team played in the Champions League 2014. The second XI were defeated in the finals of the domestic competition by Peshawar Panthers.

No.	Date	Opponent	Venue	Result	Scorecard
1	September 13	Mumbai Indians	Raipur	Won by 6 wickets	Cricinfo
2	September 14	Northern Knights	Raipur	Lost by 72 runs	Cricinfo
3	September 16	Southern Express	Raipur	Won by 55 runs	Cricinfo
4	September 21	Kolkata Knight Riders	Hyderabad	Lost by 4 wickets	Cricinfo
5	September 25	Chennai Super Kings	Bangalore	Rain interrupted the match	Cricinfo
6	September 27	Dolphins	Bangalore	Won by 16 runs	Cricinfo
7	September 30	Perth Scorchers	Bangalore	Lost by 3 wickets	Cricinfo

== Captains' record ==
List of captains of Lahore Lions for Twenty20 matches are as follows:

Player	Span	Match	Won	Lost	Tied	NR	%
(Pakistan) Mohammad Yousuf	2005–2011	14	10	4	0	0	71.42
(Pakistan) Imran Farhat	2005	1	1	0	0	0	100.00
(Pakistan) Abdul Razzaq	2006–2011	13	10	3	0	0	76.92
(South Africa) Imran Tahir	2006	1	1	0	0	0	100.00
(Pakistan) Kamran Akmal	2006–2015	9	7	2	0	0	77.77
(Pakistan) Salman Butt	2010	4	3	1	0	0	75.00
(Pakistan) Mohammad Hafeez	2012–2014	24	19	5	0	0	79.16
(Pakistan) Azhar Ali	2014	5	3	2	0	0	60.00

== Sponsors ==
FR Cables was the sponsor of the Lahore Lions in 2010-11 Faysal Bank Twenty-20 Cup and were sponsored by FR Cables for the Faysal Bank Super 8 T20 Cup 2011 as well. Brighto Paints were the sponsors of Lions in 2014 Champions League Twenty20.

== See also ==
- Pakistan Super League
