= Faisalabad Wolves =

Domestic cricket team

Personnel
- Captain: Misbah-ul-Haq
- Coach: Naveed Anjum

Team information
- Colours
- Founded: 2004
- Dissolved: 2016
- Home ground: Iqbal Stadium
- Capacity: 28,000

History
- Faysal Bank T20 Cup wins: 1
- Faysal Bank Super Eight T20 Cup wins: 1
- International 20:20 Club Championship wins: 1

The Faisalabad Wolves was a domestic limited-overs cricket team based in Faisalabad, Punjab, Pakistan. The team was established in 2004 and its home ground was Iqbal Stadium in Faisalabad.

The team were champions in the maiden season 2004–05 of the ABN-AMRO Twenty-20 Cup, now known as Faysal Bank T20 Cup

The team are World Champions because they won the only International 20:20 Club Championship which was played in England in September 2005.

The 2010 kit sponsors of the team was Ghani Automobile Industries. The 2011 kit sponsors of the team was Happilac Paints.

== Honours ==
Year	National T20 Cup
2004/05	Champions
2005/06	Runners-Up
2006/07	Group stage
2008/09	Group stage
2009	Group stage
2009/10	Runners-Up
2010/11	Group stage
2011/12	Group stage
2012/13	Runners-Up
2013/14	Runners-Up
2014/15	Group stage

Year	Super-8 T20 Cup
2011	Group stage
2012	Group stage
2013	Champions
2015	Group stage

Year	Int. T20 Club Championship
2005	Champions

Year	Champions League T20
2013	Qualifying stage

== Result summary ==
=== T20 results ===
Summary of results by season: International tournaments are written in **bold**
	Played	Wins	Losses	Tie	No Result	% Win
(Pakistan) T20 Cup 2004/05	5	4	1	0	0	80.00%
(United Kingdom) **Int. T20 Champ.**	3	3	1	0	0	75.00%
(Pakistan) T20 Cup 2005/06	8	5	3	0	0	62.50%
(Pakistan) T20 Cup 2006/07	3	2	1	0	0	66.67%
(Pakistan) T20 Cup 2008/09	3	2	1	0	0	66.67%
(Pakistan) T20 Cup 2009	3	2	1	0	0	66.67%
(Pakistan) T20 Cup 2009/10	4	3	1	0	0	75.00%
(Pakistan) T20 Cup 2010/11	2	1	1	0	0	50.00%
(Pakistan) Super 8 2011	3	1	2	0	0	33.33%
(Pakistan) T20 Cup 2011/12	3	2	1	0	0	66.66%
(Pakistan) Super 8 2012	3	1	2	0	0	33.33%
(Pakistan) T20 Cup 2012/13	8	7	1	0	0	87.50%
(Pakistan) Super 8 2013	5	4	0	1	0	80.00%
(India) (South Africa) (Australia) **CLT20 2013**	3	1	2	0	0	33.33%
(Pakistan) T20 Cup 2013/14	5	4	1	0	0	80.00%
Total	**61**	**42**	**18**	**1**	**0**	**68.85%**

Results by opposition: International teams are written in **bold**
	Played	Wins	Losses	Tie	No Result	% Win
(Pakistan) Abbottabad Falcons	4	4	0	0	0	100.00%
(Pakistan) (Afghanistan) Afghan Cheetahs	1	1	0	0	0	100.00%
(Pakistan) Bahawalpur Stags	2	2	0	0	0	100.00%
(Sri Lanka) **Chilaw Marians CC**	1	1	0	0	0	100.00%
(Pakistan) Hyderabad Hawks	1	1	0	0	0	100.00%
(Pakistan) Islamabad Leopards	3	2	1	0	0	66.67%
(Sri Lanka) **Kandurata Maroons**	1	1	0	0	0	100.00%
(Pakistan) Karachi Dolphins	7	3	4	0	0	42.85%
(Pakistan) Karachi Zebras	2	1	1	0	0	50.00%
(Pakistan) Lahore Eagles	6	6	0	0	0	100.00%
(Pakistan) Lahore Lions	7	3	4	0	0	42.85%
(Pakistan) Larkana Bulls	1	1	0	0	0	100.00%
(Pakistan) Multan Tigers	4	4	0	0	0	100.00%
(New Zealand) **Otago Volts**	1	0	1	0	0	00.00%
(England) **PCA Masters XI**	1	1	0	0	0	100.00%
(Pakistan) Peshawar Panthers	3	2	1	0	0	66.67%
(Pakistan) Quetta Bears	3	3	0	0	0	100.00%
(Pakistan) Rawalpindi Rams	7	4	2	1	0	64.28%
(Pakistan) Sialkot Stallions	4	1	3	0	0	25.00%
(England) **Somerset**	1	1	0	0	0	100.00%
(India) **Sunrisers Hyderabad**	1	0	1	0	0	00.00%
Total	**61**	**42**	**18**	**1**	**0**	**68.85%**

== Captains' Record ==
Player	Span	Match	Won	Lost	Tied	NR	%
(Pakistan) Ijaz Ahmad Jnr.	2005-2005	2	2	0	0	0	100.00
(Pakistan) Mohammad Hafeez	2005–2009	4	2	2	0	0	50.00
(Pakistan) Naved Latif	2005–2012	8	6	2	0	0	75.00
(Pakistan) Misbah-ul-Haq	2006–Present	47	32	14	1	0	69.14

== Sponsor ==
The Wolves were sponsored by Ghani Automobiles in 2010–11.

The 2011 sponsor for Faisalabad Wolves was Happilac Paints. Their sponsor for 2012 was G'Five Pakistan.

== See also ==
- Pakistan Super League
