= 2013 Super 8 Twenty20 Cup =

2013 Faysal Bank Super Eight T20 Cup
- Administrator: Pakistan Cricket Board
- Cricket format: Twenty20
- Tournament format(s): Round-robin and knockout
- Champions: Faisalabad Wolves (1st title)
- Participants: 8
- Matches: 15
- Most runs: Misbah-ul-Haq, Faisalabad Wolves, (206)
- Most wickets: Ehsan Adil, Faisalabad Wolves, (12)

The 2013 Faysal Bank Super Eight T20 Cup was the third season of the Faysal Bank Super Eight T20 Cup. It was played from March 26to 31, 2013, at the Gaddafi Stadium in Lahore. A total of 15 matches were played during the tournament.

Faisalabad Wolves were crowned the champions for the 2nd time. They beat the defending champions Sialkot Stallions in the final. Faisalabad Wolves won their first title in 2005. They participated in the 2013 Champions League Twenty20 as a result of winning the tournament.

== Venue ==
All the matches were played at Gaddafi Stadium, Lahore.

City	Ground	Capacity	Matches
Lahore	Gaddafi Stadium	Capacity:60,000	15
2013 Super 8 Twenty20 Cup is located in Pakistan

== Teams ==
- Abbottabad Falcons
- Bahawalpur Stags
- Faisalabad Wolves
- Karachi Dolphins
- Lahore Lions
- Multan Tigers
- Rawalpindi Rams
- Sialkot Stallions

== Fixtures and results ==
All times shown are in Pakistan Standard Time (UTC+05).

=== Group stage ===
==== Group A ====
Points Table Source:Cricinfo

Team	Pld	W	L	NR	NRR	Pts
Lahore Lions	3	3	0	0	+1.911	6
Sialkot Stallions	3	2	1	0	+0.328	4
Multan Tigers	3	1	2	0	-1.671	2
Abbottabad Falcons	3	0	3	0	-0.852	0

26 March
16:00 (D/N)
Scorecard

Abbottabad Falcons; 141/8 (20 overs)	v	Multan Tigers; 143/5 (17.4 overs)
Adnan Raees 34 (21); Zulfiqar Babar 3/20 (4 overs)		Zeeshan Ashraf 58 (47); Yasir Shah 3/29 (4 overs)

Multan Tigers won by 5 wickets
Gaddafi Stadium, Lahore
Umpires: Khalid Mahmood and Majid Hussain
Player of the match: Sohaib Maqsood (Multan Tigers)

- Abbottabad Falcons won the toss elected to bat
- Twenty20 debuts: Haroon (Abbottabad Falcons) and Shahab Elahi (Multan Tigers)
- Multan Tigers 2 points, Abbottabad Falcons 0 points

26 March
20:00 (D/N)
Scorecard

Lahore Lions; 162/6 (20 overs)	v	Sialkot Stallions; 118/8 (20 overs)
Nasir Jamshed 71* (56); Bilawal Bhatti 2/32 (3 overs)		Bilawal Bhatti 24* (24); Adnan Rasool 3/17 (4 overs)

Lahore Lions won by 44 runs
Gaddafi Stadium, Lahore
Umpires: Sajid Afridi and Saleem Badar
Player of the match: Nasir Jamshed (Lahore Lions)

- Lahore Lions won the toss and elected to bat
- Lahore Lions 2 points, Sialkot Stallions 0 points

27 March
12:00
Scorecard

Abbottabad Falcons; 135/9 (20 overs)	v	Sialkot Stallions; 141/5 (19.2 overs)
Yasir Hameed 43 (39); Raza Hasan 3/35 (4 overs)		Shoaib Malik 68 (53); Ahmed Jamal 2/12 (4 overs)

Sialkot Stallions won by 5 wickets
Gaddafi Stadium, Lahore
Umpires: Akram Raza and Tahir Shah
Player of the match: Shoaib Malik (Sialkot Stallions)

- Abbottabad Falcons won the toss and elected to bat
- Sialkot Stallions 2 points, Abbottabad Falcons 0 points

27 March
16:00 (D/N)
Scorecard

Lahore Lions; 174/4 (20 overs	v	Multan Tigers; 127 (19.4 overs)
Mohammad Hafeez 102* (64); Sohaib Maqsood 1/22 (4 overs)		Rameez Alam 45 (38); Zia-ul-Haq 2/20 (4 overs)

Lahore Lions won by 47 runs
Gaddafi Stadium, Lahore
Umpires: Nadeem Iqbal and Saleem Badar
Player of the match: Mohammad Hafeez (Lahore Lions)

- Lahore Lions won the toss and elected to bat
- Lahore Lions 2 points, Multan Tigers 0 points

28 March
20:00 (D/N)
Scorecard

Abbottabad Falcons; 94 (20 overs)	v	Lahore Lions; 95/7 (17 overs)
Hammad Ali 20 (24); Adnan Rasool 4/21 (4 overs)		Ahmed Shehzad 34 (27); Rashid Nawaz 4/12 (4 overs)

Lahore Lions won by 3 wickets
Gaddafi Stadium, Lahore
Umpires: Aftab Gillani and Akmal Hayat
Player of the match: Adnan Rasool (Lahore Lions)

- Abbottabad Falcons won the toss and elected to bat
- Twenty20 debuts: Aamer Shehzad, Ikramullah Khan, Waqar Orakzai (Abbottabad Falcons) and Mohammad Aftab (Lahore Lions)
- Lahore Lions 2 points, Abbottabad Falcons 0 points

29 March
10:00
Scorecard

Multan Tigers; 47/9 (14 overs)	v	Sialkot Stallions; 48/1 (6.3 overs)
Kashif Naved 16 (28); Raza Hasan 3/11 (3 overs)		Shoaib Malik 31* (20); Zulfiqar Babar 1/18 (3 overs)

Sialkot Stallions won by 9 wickets
Gaddafi Stadium, Lahore
Umpires: Riazuddin and Shozab Raza
Player of the match: Raza Hasan (Sialkot Stallions) and Shoaib Malik (Sialkot Stallions)

- Sialkot Stallions won the toss and elected to field
- Match was reduced to 14 overs per side due to rain
- Sialkot Stallions 2 points, Multan Tigers 0 points

==== Group B ====
Points Table Source:Cricinfo

Team	Pld	W	L	NR	NRR	Pts
Rawalpindi Rams	3	3	0	0	+0.528	6
Faisalabad Wolves	3	2	1	0	+1.246	4
Karachi Dolphins	3	1	2	0	+0.093	2
Bahawalpur Stags	3	0	3	0	-2.038	0

26 March
12:00
Scorecard

Faisalabad Wolves; 154/4 (20 overs)	v	Bahawalpur Stags; 91 (20 overs)
Ali Waqas 39 (41); Fahad Masood 2/14 (4 overs)		Hammad Tariq 28 (31); Khurram Shehzad 4/20 (4 overs)

Faisalabad Wolves won by 63 runs
Gaddafi Stadium, Lahore
Umpires: Akram Raza and Raweed Khan
Player of the match: Khurram Shehzad (Faisalabad Wolves)

- Faisalabad Wolves won the toss and elected to bat
- Twenty20 debut: Rehan Rafiq (Bahawalpur Stags)
- Faisalabad Wolves 2 points, Bahawalpur Stags 0 points

27 March
20:00 (D/N)
Scorecard

Karachi Dolphins; 149 (20 overs)	v	Rawalpindi Rams; 157 (20 overs)
Mohammad Sami 38 (18); Yasir Arafat 4/28 (3 overs)		Umar Amin 36 (31); Anwar Ali 4/32 (4 overs)

Rawalpindi Rams won by 8 runs
Gaddafi Stadium, Lahore
Umpires: Ehtesham-ul-Haq and Ghaffar Kazmi
Player of the match: Yasir Arafat (Rawalpindi Rams)

- Rawalpindi Rams won the toss and elected to bat
- Rawalpindi Rams 4 points, Karachi Dolphins 0 points

28 March
12:00
Scorecard

Bahawalpur Stags; 96 (12.2 overs)	v	Rawalpindi Rams; 145/5 (18 overs)
Kashif Siddiq 45 (20); Hammad Azam 3/23 (3 overs)		Naved Malik 29 (24); Bilal Khilji 3/24 (4 overs)

Rawalpindi Rams won by 20 runs (D/L method)
Gaddafi Stadium, Lahore
Umpires: Saqib Khan and Tahir Shah
Player of the match: Sohail Tanvir (Rawalpindi Rams)

- Bahawalpur Stags won the toss and elected to field
- Twenty20 debuts: Mohammad Mudassar and Zeeshan Khalid (Bahawalpur Stags)
- Rain stopped Rawalpindi Rams innings at 145/5 off 18 overs. Match reduced to 13 overs and revised target for Bahawalpur Stags is 117
- Rawalpindi Rams 2 points, Bahawalpur Stags 0 points

28 March
16:00 (D/N)
Scorecard

Faisalabad Wolves; 161/3 (19 overs)	v	Karachi Dolphins; 157/8 (20 overs)
Misbah-ul-Haq 85* (47); Akbar-ur-Rehman 1/31 (4 overs)		Shahzaib Hasan 51 (39); Khurram Shehzad 3/24 (4 overs)

Faisalabad Wolves won by 7 wickets
Gaddafi Stadium, Lahore
Umpires: Ahmed Shahab and Qaiser Waheed
Player of the match: Misbah-ul-Haq (Faisalabad Wolves)

- Karachi Dolphins won the toss and elected to bat
- Faisalabad Wolves 2 points, Karachi Dolphins 0 points

29 March
16:00 (D/N)
Scorecard

Faisalabad Wolves; 143/5 (20 overs)	v	Rawalpindi Rams; 143 (20 overs)
Misbah-ul-Haq 42 (34); Akhtar Ayub 2/20 (4 overs)		Hammad Azam 66 (35); Samiullah Khan 3/22 (4 overs)

Match tied and Rawalpindi Rams won the one-over eliminator
Gaddafi Stadium, Lahore
Umpires: Ahsan Raza and Saqib Khan
Player of the match: Hammad Azam (Rawalpindi Rams)

- Rawalpindi Rams won the toss and elected to bat
- Rawalpindi Rams 2 points, Faisalabad Wolves 0 points

29 March
20:00 (D/N)
Scorecard

Karachi Dolphins; 146/8 (20 overs)	v	Bahawalpur Stags; 121/6 (20 overs)
Fawad Alam 60 (48); Fahad Masood 4/25 (4 overs)		Faisal Mubashir 39 (43); Azam Hussain 2/19 (4 overs)

Karachi Dolphins won by 25 runs
Gaddafi Stadium, Lahore
Umpires: Kamal Merchant and Zameer Haider
Player of the match: Fawad Alam (Karachi Dolphins)

- Karachi Dolphins, who chose to bat
- Twenty20 debuts Faisal Mubashir, Mustansar Hussain, Nauman Akram and Waqas Khan (Bahawalpur Stags)
- Karachi Dolphins 2 points, Bahawalpur Stags 0 points

=== Knockout stage ===
Semifinals
A1	Lahore Lions	123 (20 ov)
B2	Faisalabad Wolves	125/8 (20 ov)
B1	Rawalpindi Rams	136 (20 ov)
A2	Sialkot Stallions	139/8 (20 ov)

Final
SF1	Faisalabad Wolves	158/3 (20 ov)
SF2	Sialkot Stallions	122 (19.1 ov)

=== Semi-finals ===
30 March
16:00 (D/N)
Scorecard

Lahore Lions; 123 (20 overs)	v	Faisalabad Wolves; 125/8 (20 overs)
Nasir Jamshed 46 (39); Ehsan Adil 3/23 (4 ov)		Khurram Shehzad 27 (30); Mohammad Hafeez 3/30 (4 ov)

Faisalabad Wolves Won by 2 runs
Gaddafi Stadium, Lahore
Player of the match: Ehsan Adil (Faisalabad Wolves)

- Faisalabad Wolves won the toss and elected to bat

30 March
20:00 (D/N)
Scorecard

Rawalpindi Rams; 136 (20 overs)	v	Sialkot Stallions; 139/8 (20 overs)
Umar Waheed 44 (38); Rana Naveed 3/30 (3 ov)		Shoaib Malik 44 (35); Umar Amin 3/28 (4 ov)

Sialkot Stallions Won by 3 runs
Gaddafi Stadium, Lahore
Umpires: Ghaffar Kazmi and Ahsan Raza
Player of the match: Shoaib Malik (Sialkot Stallions)

- Sialkot Stallions won the toss and elected to bat

=== Final ===
30 March 2013
19:00 UTC+10 (D/N)
Scorecard

Faisalabad Wolves; 158/3 (20 overs)	v	Sialkot Stallions; 122 (19.1 overs)
Asif Ali 70 (49); Shoaib Malik 1/10 (2 ov)		Shoaib Malik 40 (39); Asad Ali 3/21 (3.1 ov)

Faisalabad Wolves won by 36 runs
Gaddafi Stadium, Lahore
Umpires: Kamal Marchant and Shozab Raza
Player of the match: Asif Ali (Faisalabad Wolves

- Faisalabad Wolves won the toss and elected to bat
