= Adnan Raza =

Pakistani cricketer (born 1987)

Personal information
- Born: 5 December 1987 (age 38); Lahore, Pakistan
- Source: Cricinfo, 12 November 2015

Adnan Raza (born 5 December 1987) is a Pakistani former first-class cricketer who played for Lahore cricket team. In February 2021, he began to undertake coaching courses with the Pakistan Cricket Board.
