= Khalid Mahmood (cricketer) =

Pakistani cricketer (born 1976)

Personal information
- Full name: Hafiz Khalid Mahmood
- Born: 12 October 1976 (age 50); Gujranwala, Punjab, Pakistan
- Source: Cricinfo, 28 March 2021

Hafiz Khalid Mahmood (born 12 October 1976) is a Pakistani former cricketer. He played in 90 first-class and 62 List A matches between 1997 and 2008. He made his Twenty20 debut on 26 April 2005, for Sialkot Stallions in the 2004–05 National Twenty20 Cup.
