= Sialkot Stallions =

Domestic cricket team

Sialkot Stallions سیالکوٹ اسٹالینز

Personnel
- Captain: Shoaib Malik

Team information
- Colors
- Founded: 2004
- Dissolved: 2016
- Home ground: Jinnah Stadium
- Capacity: 30,000

History
- National T20 Cup wins: 6 (2005–2006) (2006–2007) (2008–2009) (2009) (2009–2010) (2011–2012)
- Official website: pcb.com.pk

The Sialkot Stallions (Urdu: سیالکوٹ اسٹالینز) was a National T20 Cup team, based in Sialkot, Punjab, Pakistan. The team was established in 2004 and its home ground was Jinnah Stadium in Sialkot.

The Stallions were the most successful team in Pakistani Twenty20 history, having won five consecutive National T20 Cups between 2005/2006 and 2009/10 under coach Azmat Rana. This period of success included a winning streak of 25 consecutive games, a world record for a top-level Twenty20 competition.

== Champions League Twenty20 ==
Sialkot Stallions were among eight teams from around the world to secure a berth for the 2008 Champions League Twenty20 that was to be held in India. However, the tournament was cancelled due to the 2008 Mumbai attacks.

The Stallions became the first Pakistan domestic team to officially receive an invitation to play in the Champions League Twenty20, to be held in the South Africa in 2012. Later on, they got the confirmation from the CLT20's Governing Council after it approved the BCCI's invitation to Sialkot Stallions for participation in CLT20. Then, it was revealed that the Stallions will have to compete (with five other teams from different countries) in Qualifier tournament for the two available positions in the Champions League.

== Result summary ==
=== T20 Results ===
Summary of results by season: International tournaments are written in **bold**
Year	Played	Wins	Losses	No Result	% Win
(Pakistan) T20 Cup 2004/05	3	1	2	0	33.33%
(Pakistan) T20 Cup 2005/06	8	8	0	0	100.00%
(Pakistan) T20 Cup 2006/07	4	4	0	0	100.00%
(Pakistan) T20 Cup 2008/09	4	4	0	0	100.00%
(Pakistan) T20 Cup 2009	4	4	0	0	100.00%
(Pakistan) T20 Cup 2009/10	4	4	0	0	100.00%
(Pakistan) T20 Cup 2010/11	2	1	1	0	50.00%
(Pakistan) Super-8 T20 2011	5	2	3	0	50.00%
(Pakistan) T20 Cup 2011/12	4	4	0	0	100.00%
(Pakistan) Super-8 T20 2012	5	5	0	0	100.00%
(India) (South Africa) (Australia) **CLT20 2012**	2	1	1	0	50.00%
(Pakistan) T20 Cup 2012/13	6	4	2	0	66.67%
(Pakistan) Super 8 2013	5	3	2	0	60.00%
(Pakistan) T20 Cup 2013/14	5	3	2	0	60.00%
Total	**60**	**48**	**12**	**0**	**80.00%**

Sialkot Stallions logo before the 2010–11 season

Results by opposition: International teams are written in **bold**
Opposition	Played	Wins	Losses	No Result	% Win
(Pakistan) Abbottabad Falcons	2	2	0	0	100.00%
(New Zealand) **Auckland Aces**	1	0	1	0	00.00%
(Pakistan) Faisalabad Wolves	4	3	1	0	75.00%
(England) **Hampshire Royals**	1	1	0	0	100.00%
(Pakistan) Hyderabad Hawks	5	5	0	0	100.00%
(Pakistan) Islamabad Leopards	3	2	1	0	66.67%
(Pakistan) Karachi Dolphins	8	6	2	0	75.00%
(Pakistan) Karachi Zebras	8	7	1	0	87.50%
(Pakistan) Lahore Eagles	5	4	1	0	80.00%
(Pakistan) Lahore Lions	7	4	3	0	57.14%
(Pakistan) Larkana Bulls	1	1	0	0	100.00%
(Pakistan) Multan Tigers	5	4	1	0	80.00%
(Pakistan) Peshawar Panthers	2	2	0	0	100.00%
(Pakistan) Quetta Bears	2	2	0	0	100.00%
(Pakistan) Rawalpindi Rams	6	5	1	0	83.33%
Total	**60**	**48**	**12**	**0**	**80.00%**

== Sponsor ==
The Stallions were sponsored by telecommunication giant Ufone in last season.

The 2011 sponsor for Sialkot Stallion is Canon Foam.

In 2011/12 National T20 Cup, Sialkot Stallions was Sponsored by Audionic The Sound Master.

== See also ==
- Pakistan Super League
- Faysal Bank Twenty-20 Cup
- National One-day Championship
- Patron's Trophy
- Pentangular Trophy
- Quaid-i-Azam Trophy
