= Fahad-ul-Haq =

Pakistani cricketer (born 1982)

Personal information
- Born: 16 December 1982 (age 43); Lahore, Pakistan
- Source: ESPNcricinfo, 6 November 2016

Fahad-ul-Haq (born 16 December 1982) is a Pakistani cricketer who plays for Lahore cricket team. He made his first-class debut in 2002–03, and played in 73 first-class matches during his career.
