= Mohammad Saeed (cricketer, born 1983) =

Pakistani cricketer (born 1983)

Personal information
- Born: 12 October 1983 (age 43); Lahore, Pakistan
- Source: Cricinfo, 12 November 2015

Mohammad Saeed (born 12 October 1983) is a Pakistani first-class cricketer who plays for Lahore cricket team.
