= Sabih Azhar =

Pakistani cricketer and coach (born 1962)

Personal information
- Born: 28 February 1962 (age 64); Rawalpindi, Punjab, Pakistan
- Batting: Right-handed
- Bowling: Right-arm fast-medium
- Role: All-Rounder

Domestic team information
- Years: Team
- 1981–1999: Agriculture Development Bank of Pakistan
- 1981–1999: Rawalpindi

Career statistics
| Competition | First-class | List A |
|---|---|---|
| Matches | 137 | 91 |
| Runs scored | 3,722 | 1,026 |
| Batting average | 20.01 | 16.28 |
| 100s/50s | 1/19 | 0/3 |
| Top score | 100* | 79 |
| Balls bowled | 9,631 | 2,582 |
| Wickets | 169 | 49 |
| Bowling average | 27.73 | 38.26 |
| 5 wickets in innings | 10 | 0 |
| 10 wickets in match | 1 | 0 |
| Best bowling | 7/61 | 4/19 |
| Catches/stumpings | 50/– | 26/– |
- Source: ESPNCricinfo, 4 August 2014

Sabih Azhar (born 28 February 1962) is a Pakistani cricket coach and former first-class cricketer.

He played for Agriculture Development Bank of Pakistan and Rawalpindi in first-class and List A matches.

== Coaching career ==
- Sabih Azhar was the coach of Pakistan Under-19 in U-19 Asia Cup 2012, where Pakistan Under-19 shared the title with India Under-19 after the TIE in the Final.
- Sabih Azhar was the coach of Pakistan Under-19 in U-19 World Cup 2012, where Pakistan Under-19 ended the tournament at No.8.
- Sabih Azhar was the coach of Pakistan Under-25 in 2012 SAARC T20 Cup, where Pakistan ended as the Champion.
- Sabih Azhar also coached the women's cricket team of Pakistan until 2017

== Achievements as Coach of Rawalpindi ==
- Super-8 T20 Cup 2011 - Winners
- Quaid-e-Azam Trophy 2013–14 - Winners
