= Lahore Regional Cricket Association =

- انجمن علاقائی کرکٹ لاہور
- Legal status: Incorporated association
- Headquarters: LCCA Ground
- Location: Lahore, Punjab, Pakistan
- Region served: Lahore
- President LRCA: Mr. Nadeem Ahmed
- Affiliations: Pakistan Cricket Board
- Website: LRCA

The Lahore Regional Cricket Association (LRCA) is the governing body for cricket in Lahore, Punjab, Pakistan. It is affiliated to the Pakistan Cricket Board and has fielded a number of Lahore teams in Pakistan's domestic competitions.

== History ==
The Lahore Regional Cricket Association, formerly the Lahore City Cricket Association (LCCA), was formed in the early 1950s. It has two grounds in Lahore: the LCCA Ground and the Gaddafi Stadium, which are both adjacent to each other.
