= Amin-ur-Rehman =

Pakistani cricketer (born 1983)

Personal information
- Born: 22 September 1983 (age 43); Karachi, Pakistan
- Source: ESPNcricinfo, 13 December 2016

Amin-ur-Rehman (born 22 September 1983) is a Pakistani cricketer. He played 50 first-class and 55 List A matches between 2000 and 2016. He was also part of Pakistan's squad for the 2002 Under-19 Cricket World Cup.

A wicket-keeper, for some time he was on the fringe of the national team. The Pakistan coach Bob Woolmer said of him: "He has the best pair of hands I have seen among Pakistani keepers but his fitness level is appalling. I told him [to] get fit. You will then walk into the national side."
