= Bilal Khilji =

Pakistani cricketer and match referee (born 1975)

Personal information
- Full name: Bilal Moin-ul-Haq Khilji
- Born: 10 September 1975 (age 51); Bahawalpur, Pakistan
- Batting: Left-handed
- Bowling: Right-arm medium
- Source: Cricinfo, 8 November 2015

Bilal Moin-ul-Haq Khilji (born 10 September 1975) is a Pakistani match referee and former first-class cricketer. He played more than 200 first-class cricket matches for multiple teams and captained the Bahawalpur cricket team.

== Early life ==
Khilji was born on 10 September 1975 in Bahawalpur, Punjab, Pakistan.

== Career ==
Beginning his first-class cricket career with Bahawalpur in the 1994/95 season, Khilji played until the 2012/13 season. Between these years, he represented multiple first-class cricket teams, including the Pakistan National Shipping Corporation, Water and Power Development Authority, and Service Industries. His cricket career also took him to Pakistan Customs (2003/04), Multan and the Multan Tigers (2004/05-2011/12), Punjab (2006/07), and Baluchistan (2007/08-2008/09). He returned to Bahawalpur Stags in the 2012/13 season and continued until 2014/15.
