= Zain Abbas (Pakistani cricketer) =

Pakistani cricketer (born 1991)

Personal information
- Born: 2 November 1991 (age 35); Kabirwala, Punjab, Pakistan
- Batting: Left-handed
- Bowling: Right-arm medium
- Role: All Rounder

Domestic team information
- Years: Team
- 2011-?: Baluchistan
- 2011-?: Multan Tigers
- 2019–2022: Southern Punjab
- 2023–present: Multan Region (squad no. 05)

Career statistics
Competition	FC
Matches	54
Runs scored	2648
Batting average	31.15
100s/50s	3/15
Top score	178
Balls bowled	333
Wickets	5
Bowling average	28.80
5 wickets in innings	0
10 wickets in match	0
Best bowling	2/11
Catches/stumpings	49/-
- Source: Cricinfo, 25 November 2015

Zain Abbas (born 2 November 1991) is a Pakistani first-class cricketer who plays for Khan Research Laboratories. In April 2018, he was named in Punjab's squad for the 2018 Pakistan Cup. In September 2019, he was named in Southern Punjab's squad for the 2019–20 Quaid-e-Azam Trophy tournament.

Over the years, Zain has also represented Balochistan, Multan, Pakistan A, State Bank of Pakistan and Sui Southern Gas Corporation.
