= Zeeshan Mushtaq =

Pakistani cricketer (born 1989)

Personal information
- Born: 1 October 1989 (age 37); Gujrat, Pakistan
- Source: Cricinfo, 18 March 2021

Zeeshan Mushtaq (born 1 October 1989) is a Pakistani cricketer. He played in 47 first-class and 30 List A matches between 2007 and 2016.
