= Iqbal Stadium =

Cricket stadium in Faisalabad, Pakistan

Iqbal Stadium, Faisalabad
- اقبال سٹیڈیم، فیصل آباد
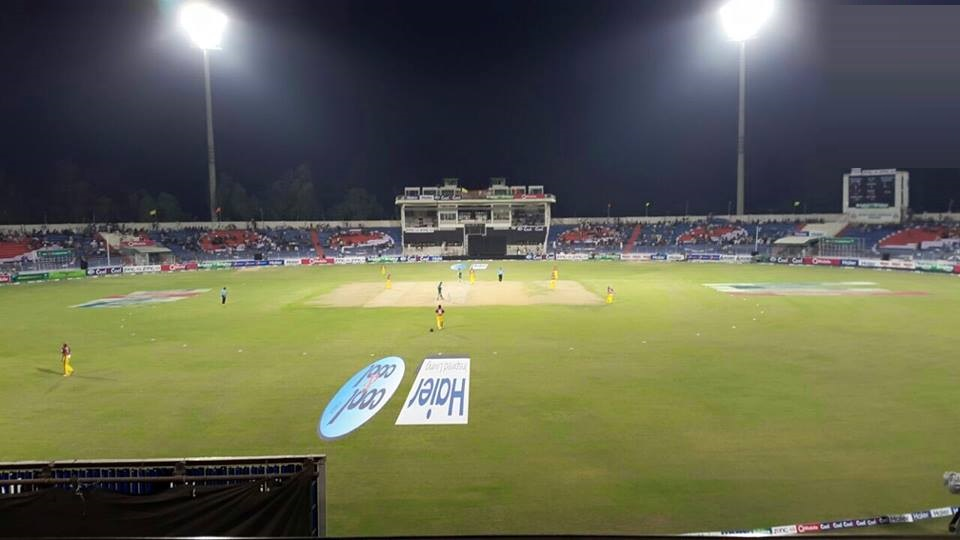
- View of Iqbal Stadium Faisalabad
- Interactive map of Iqbal Stadium, Faisalabad
- Address: Faisalabad, Punjab, Pakistan
- Owner: Pakistan Cricket Board
- Capacity: 17,000
- Public transit: Iqbal Stadium

Construction
- Opened: 1978; 48 years ago
- Renovated: September 7, 2025; 13 months ago

Ground information

International information
- First men's Test: 16 October 1978: Pakistan v India
- Last men's Test: 21 January 2006: Pakistan v India
- First men's ODI: 23 November 1984: Pakistan v New Zealand
- Last men's ODI: 8 November 2025: Pakistan v South Africa
- As of 4 November 2025; Source: Iqbal Stadium, ESPNcricinfo

Iqbal Stadium (Urdu: اقبال سٹیڈیم), formerly known as Lyallpur Stadium, is a cricket stadium in Faisalabad, Pakistan. Constructed in the 1970s, it has hosted 24 Tests and 19 ODIs so far. The venue has also been a key site for Pakistan's domestic cricket tournaments, such as the Quaid-e-Azam Trophy.

The seating capacity of the stadium stands at 17,000.

== History ==
Iqbal Stadium was established in the early 1970s to accommodate the growing popularity of cricket in Faisalabad. Originally known as Lyallpur Stadium, it was renamed Iqbal Stadium in honor of Pakistan's national poet, Muhammad Iqbal. The stadium quickly became one of Pakistan's most important cricketing venues, hosting its first Test match in October 1978 between Pakistan and India.

A modern and well-equipped cricket venue, it has suffered at the hands of weather conditions in the past. In 1998–99, the third Test against Zimbabwe was abandoned without a ball being bowled due to thick fog. Poor visibility has also caused difficulty in playing especially during the winter.

Since its inception, Iqbal Stadium has witnessed several historic cricketing moments, including famous Test matches involving Pakistan and international teams. An thrilling Test match was played between South Africa and Pakistan in 1997–98, when the visitors bowled out the hosts for 92 runs, successfully defending a target of 142 on the final day. Then, in the 2004–05 season, Sanath Jayasuriya of Sri Lanka scored 253 as his team romped to a 201-run victory.

The ground is, however, most renowned for the on-field spat between England captain Mike Gatting and Pakistani umpire Shakoor Rana during England's 1987–88 tour. While being the square-leg umpire, Rana had objected to Gatting waving his hand at another fielder while the bowler was running in. A fierce altercation followed, which led to a day being lost during the match and some long-lasting bad feeling between the teams. The issue forced the British Ambassador Sir Nicholas Barrington to get involved in order to de-escalate the situation and force an apology from the England captain.

The stadium regularly hosted international matches until 2009, when all international cricket activities were suspended in Pakistan after the 2009 attack on the Sri Lanka national cricket team. The stadium, however, continued hosting domestic matches.

=== Domestic tournaments ===
The stadium hosted the 2011 and 2015 editions of the Super 8 Twenty20 Cup.

In 2016, four new cricket pitches were added to take the total cricket pitches to nine.

In September 2019, the Pakistan Cricket Board named it as one of the venues for matches in the 2019–20 Quaid-e-Azam Trophy.

The stadium hosted the finals of the National T20 Cup in 2019 and 2025.

In August 2024, it was announced that the stadium would host all the matches of newly formulated domestic 2024–25 Champions One-Day Cup.

=== Return to international cricket ===
In September 2024, the Pakistan Cricket Board revealed plans to upgrade the stadium to enable international matches to be hosted there.

On 30 April 2025, it was announced that international cricket will return to Iqbal Stadium after a gap of 17 years, with Bangladesh touring Pakistan in May 2025. Iqbal Stadium was to host the first two T20Is on 25 May and 27 May, but it did not host the matches due to certain reasons. Pakistan hosted South Africa for three ODIs from 4 to 8 November 2025 at the Iqbal Stadium, the first ODI at the stadium in 17 years, with Pakistan having beaten Bangladesh by seven wickets at the venue on 11 April 2008.

The venue hosted the Women's U19 T20 Tri-Series featuring Pakistan, Bangladesh, and Sri Lanka from 2 to 16 October 2026.

== Ground records ==
- First Test: 1st Test, Pakistan vs. India, 16–21 October 1978.
- First ODI: Pakistan vs. New Zealand, 23 November 1984.

=== Tests ===
- Highest innings total: 674/6 by Pakistan vs. India, October 1984.
- Lowest innings total: 53 all out by West Indies vs. Pakistan, October 1986.
- Highest individual score: 253 by Sanath Jayasuriya for Sri Lanka vs. Pakistan, October 2004.
- Best bowling figures (match): 12/130 (7/76 & 5/54) by Waqar Younis for Pakistan vs. New Zealand, October 1990.

=== One-day internationals ===
- Highest innings total: 314/7 (50 overs) by Pakistan vs. New Zealand, December 2003.
- Highest individual score: 123* by Quinton de Kock for South Africa vs. Pakistan, November 2025.
- Best bowling figures: 4/27 (4 overs) by Mudassar Nazar for Pakistan vs. New Zealand, November 1984.

== See also ==
- List of Test cricket grounds
- List of stadiums in Pakistan
- List of cricket grounds in Pakistan
- List of sports venues in Faisalabad
