= Javed Mansoor =

Pakistani cricketer (born 1982)

Personal information
- Born: 11 April 1982 (age 44); Karachi, Pakistan
- Source: Cricinfo, 14 November 2015

Javed Mansoor (born 11 April 1982) is a Pakistani first-class cricketer who plays for Karachi cricket team.
