= Imranullah Aslam =

Pakistani cricketer (born 1980)

Personal information
- Born: 14 August 1980 (age 46); Bahawalpur, Pakistan
- Source: Cricinfo, 12 November 2015

Imranullah Aslam (born 14 August 1980) is a Pakistani former cricketer and umpire. He played for Bahawalpur cricket team in Pakistan and Panadura Sports Club in Sri Lanka.
