= Mustafa Iqbal =

Pakistani cricketer (born 1988)

Personal information
- Born: 21 September 1988 (age 38); Abu Dhabi, United Arab Emirates
- Source: Cricinfo, 28 November 2015

Mustafa Iqbal (born 21 September 1988) is a Pakistani first-class cricketer who plays for Lahore cricket team.
