= Farrukh Shehzad =

Pakistani cricketer (born 1984)

Personal information
- Born: 12 October 1984 (age 42)
- Source: Cricinfo, 27 March 2021

Farrukh Shehzad (born 12 October 1984) is a Pakistani cricketer. He played in 28 first-class, 25 List A, and 32 Twenty20 matches between 2002 and 2015.
