= Kashif Siddiq =

Pakistani cricketer (born 1981)

Personal information
- Born: 31 December 1981 (age 44); Lahore, Pakistan
- Source: Cricinfo, 12 November 2015

Kashif Siddiq (born 31 December 1981) is a Pakistani first-class cricketer who played for Lahore cricket team.

In 2014, Siddiq was handed a two year suspension for failing a doping test. Siddiq was found to have used Nandralone and Stanozolol.
