= Ijaz Ahmed (cricketer, born 1969) =

Pakistani cricketer (born 1969)

Personal information
- Full name: Ijaz Ahmed
- Born: 2 February 1969 (age 57); Lyallpur, Punjab, Pakistan
- Batting: Right-handed
- Bowling: Right-arm offbreak

International information
- National side: Pakistan (1995–1997)
- Test debut (cap 133): 8 September 1995 v Sri Lanka
- Last Test: 15 September 1995 v Sri Lanka
- ODI debut (cap 117): 10 January 1997 v West Indies
- Last ODI: 14 January 1997 v West Indies

Career statistics
Competition	Test	ODI
Matches	2	2
Runs scored	29	3
Batting average	9.66	–
100s/50s	0/0	0/0
Top score	16	3*
Balls bowled	24	30
Wickets	0	1
Bowling average	–	25.00
5 wickets in innings	–	0
10 wickets in match	–	0
Best bowling	–	1/9
Catches/stumpings	3/–	1/–
- Source: ESPNcricinfo, 4 February 2017

Ijaz Ahmed (Urdu: اعجاز احمد) (born 2 February 1969), also known as Ijaz Ahmed Jr. is a Pakistani cricket coach and former cricketer who played in two Test matches in 1995 and two One Day Internationals in 1997. He played as a batting all-rounder who could bowl right arm off break. In the domestic cricket, he represented Allied Bank Limited and Faisalabad.
