= Zohaib Ahmed =

Pakistani cricketer (born 1986)

Personal information
- Born: 2 March 1986 (age 40); Islamabad, Pakistan
- Source: Cricinfo, 31 October 2015

Zohaib Ahmed (born 2 March 1986) is a Pakistani cricketer who played for Islamabad and Pakistan Television. He played in 85 first-class, 64 List A, and 50 Twenty20 matches from 2005 to 2018.
