= Shaukat Mirza =

Pakistani cricketer (born 1959)

Cricket information
- Batting: Right-handed
- Bowling: Right-arm offbreak

Career statistics
Competition	First-class	List A
Matches	154	106
Runs scored	8,469	2,244
Batting average	37.47	28.40
100s/50s	21/37	0/14
Top score	160*	93
Balls bowled	770	206
Wickets	11	6
Bowling average	36.72	29.50
5 wickets in innings	0	0
10 wickets in match	0	0
Best bowling	2/17	1/0
Catches/stumpings	90/1	22/0
- Source: CricketArchive, 12 January 2023

Shaukat Mirza Baig (born 5 June 1959) is a Pakistani former first-class cricketer. In a career that lasted over 20 years, Shaukat played for Karachi and Habib Bank Limited.
