= Hasan Mahmood =

Pakistani cricketer (born 1991)

Personal information
- Born: 1 January 1991 (age 35); Sargodha, Pakistan
- Source: ESPNcricinfo, 23 December 2016

Hasan Mahmood (born 1 January 1991) is a Pakistani cricketer. He made his first-class debut for Faisalabad in the 2007–08 Quaid-e-Azam Trophy on 26 December 2007. He has also played for Punjab and the State Bank of Pakistan teams.
