= Haaris Ayaz =

Pakistani cricketer (born 1975)

Syed Haaris Ayaz
Cricket information
- Batting: Right-handed
- Bowling: Right-arm off-break

Career statistics
Competition	First-class	List A
Matches	29	54
Runs scored	510	515
Batting average	12.43	13.91
100s/50s	0/4	1/1
Top score	68	107
Balls bowled	4382	2,426
Wickets	46	48
Bowling average	48.06	42.10
5 wickets in innings	0	0
10 wickets in match	0	0
Best bowling	4/63	3/37
Catches/stumpings	11/–	23/–
- Source: Cricinfo, 3 November 2021

Haaris Ayaz (born 16 October 1975) is a Pakistani first-class cricketer who plays for the Public Works Department and Karachi. He represented Karachi Zebras team in the Faysal Bank T20 Cup 2012-13 season. Against Hyderabad at Karachi in 1998/99, his 8th-wicket partnership of 203 runs, with Shahid Iqbal, is a world record in List-A cricket.
