= Naved Malik =

Pakistani cricketer (born 1986)

Personal information
- Born: 28 January 1986 (age 40); Rawalpindi, Pakistan
- Batting: Right-handed
- Bowling: Right arm bowler

Career statistics
Competition	FC	LA	T20
Matches	74	60	62
Runs scored	3,133	1,691	1,381
Batting average	24.10	31.31	23.01
100s/50s	3/15	3/9	0/12
Top score	139*	179*	90
Balls bowled	202	200	–
Wickets	1	8	–
Bowling average	103.00	27.00	–
5 wickets in innings	0	0	–
10 wickets in match	0	0	–
Best bowling	1/3	4/35	–
Catches/stumpings	27/–	21/–	14/–
- Source: Cricinfo, 25 March 2022

Naved Malik (born 28 January 1986) is a Pakistani former first-class cricketer who played for Rawalpindi cricket team. He played in 74 first-class, 60 List A and 62 Twenty20 matches between 2006 and 2019. In January 2015, he scored an unbeaten 179 runs in a List A match against Zarai Taraqiati Bank Limited.
