= Bahawalpur Stags =

Bahawalpur Stags بہاولپور سٹیگز
Personnel
- Captain: (Pakistan) Bilal Khilji
- Coach: (Pakistan) Shahid Anwar

Team information
- Colours
- Founded: 2012
- Dissolved: 2016
- Home ground: Bahawal Stadium

History
- Haier T20 Cup wins: 0
- Official website: Bahawalpur Stags

The Bahawalpur Stags (Urdu: بهاولپور سٹاگس) was a Pakistani men's professional Twenty20 cricket team that competed in the Haier T20 League and was based in Bahawalpur, Punjab, Pakistan. The Stags played at the Bahawal Stadium, also known as Dring Stadium.

== History ==
The Stags were established in the 2012–13 season.

== Seasons ==
Season	League standing	Final standing
2012–13	Semi-finals	Knockout stage
2013–14	4th out of 4	Group stage
2014–15	3rd out of 4	Group stage
2015–16	4th out of 6	Main round
