= Lahore cricket teams =

Cricket teams

Lahore cricket teams, representing the city of Lahore, the capital of Punjab province, have competed in Pakistan's first-class cricket tournaments from 1958–59 to 2018–19, and from 2023 to 2024. They have also competed in the national 50-over and Twenty-20 tournaments as the Lahore Lions.

== Teams ==
From the inaugural season of the Quaid-e-Azam Trophy in 1953–54 until 1957–58, the province of Punjab was represented by the Punjab cricket team (as well as by Punjab A and Punjab B in 1957–58). In the 1958–59 season the Punjab cities Lahore, Rawalpindi, Bahawalpur and Multan fielded teams. Owing to Lahore's population and cricketing strength, beginning with the 1961–62 season the Lahore Regional Cricket Association has usually fielded more than one team in first-class tournaments. (Karachi has done the same, and for the same considerations, since the late 1950s.)

In 2019, domestic cricket in Pakistan was significantly restructured, with six provincial first-class teams replacing the traditional mix of regional associations and departments, and Lahore being represented by Central Punjab. In 2023, this structure was abandoned, with two Lahore teams, the Whites and the Blues, returning to first-class competition, competing in the 2023–24 Quaid-e-Azam Trophy.

=== List of Lahore first-class teams before 2023 ===
From 1958–59 to 2014-15 there were 18 Lahore first-class teams. In order of appearance they were:

Lahore
1958–59 to 2003–04, 30 matches in nine seasons; eight wins, nine losses, 13 draws.
The highest score was 203 (retired hurt) by Iftikhar Bukhari in 1960–61. The best bowling figures were 9 for 28 by Khalid Qureshi, also in 1960–61.

Lahore A
1961–62 to 1977–78, 30 matches in 10 seasons.

Lahore B
1961–62 to 1977–78, 32 matches in 10 seasons.

Lahore Whites
1963–64 to 2004–05, 37 matches in six seasons; eight wins, 12 losses, 17 draws.

Lahore Greens
1963–64 to 1973–74, 18 matches in six seasons; five wins, three losses, 10 draws.

Lahore Reds
1964–65 to 1973–74, four matches in four seasons; three losses, one draw.

Lahore Blues
1969–70 to 2004–05, 39 matches in seven seasons; 14 wins, 11 losses, 14 draws.

Lahore C
1974–75 to 1975–76, two matches in two seasons; two losses.

Lahore City A
1978–79 to 1987–88, six matches in three seasons; three wins, one loss, two draws.

Lahore City B
1978–79, one match; one loss.

Lahore City
1979–80 to 1999–2000, 166 matches in 19 seasons; 48 wins, 60 losses, 58 draws.

Lahore City Whites
1983–84 to 1986–87, 18 matches in four seasons; six wins, six losses, six draws.

Lahore City Blues
1983–84 to 1986–87, 11 matches in four seasons; five wins, two losses, four draws.

Lahore City Greens
1983–84, three matches in one season; no wins, one loss, two draws.

Lahore Shalimar
2005–06 to 2013–14, 77 matches in nine seasons; 15 wins, 35 losses, 27 draws.

Lahore Ravi
2005–06 to 2013–14, 75 matches in nine seasons; 20 wins, 24 losses, 31 draws.

=== Other Lahore teams ===
Lahore Lions
2014–15, 11 matches in one season; two wins, eight losses, one draw.

Lahore Eagles
2014–15, six matches in one season; no wins, four losses, two draws.

Lahore Qalandars

Debuted in 2016 Pakistan Super League.

== Honours ==
=== Quaid-e-Azam Trophy ===
Lahore teams have won the Quaid-e-Azam Trophy on four occasions.

- 1968–69 (Lahore)
- 1993–94 (Lahore)
- 1996–97 (Lahore)
- 2000–01 (Lahore Blues)

=== Patron's Trophy ===
Lahore teams have won the Patron's Trophy once.

- 1999–2000 (Lahore City Blues)

== See also ==
- Lahore Regional Cricket Association
- Lahore Lions
- Lahore Eagles
- Lahore women's cricket team
