= Hyderabad Hawks =

Personnel
- Captain: (Pakistan) Sharjeel Khan
- Coach: (Pakistan) Shaukat Mirza

Team information
- Colors
- Founded: 2004
- Dissolved: 2016
- Home ground: Niaz Stadium
- Capacity: 15,000

The Hyderabad Hawks was a domestic cricket team, based in Hyderabad, Sindh, Pakistan. The team was established in 2004 and its home ground was the Niaz Stadium for 2011.

== See also ==
- Pakistan Super League
