= Multan Tigers =

Cricket team in Pakistan

Coordinates: 30°10′15″N 71°31′29″E

Personnel
- Captain: Kamran Akmal
- Coach: Waseem Haider

Team information
- Colours: Lime green and dark green
- Founded: 2004
- Dissolved: 2016
- Home ground: Multan Cricket Stadium
- Capacity: 35,000
- Official website: http://www.pcb.com.pk

The Multan Tigers was a Pakistani domestic T20 and List A cricket team based in Multan, Punjab, Pakistan. The team was established in 2004 and its home ground is the Multan Cricket Stadium. The manager of the Tigers is Sheikh Saleem.

== Former Notable Players ==
- Abdur Rauf
- Shabbir Ahmed
- Mohammad Irfan
- Kamran Hussain
- Azharullah
- Adnan Akmal

== Sponsors ==
Inverex Power was the main sponsor for Multan Tigers in the 2015–16 Haier T20 Cup along with Haier Pakistan, Hunt Garments and Multan Region Cricket Association (MRCA).

== See also ==
- Faysal Bank T20 Cup
- Pakistan Super League
- 2015–16 Haier T20 Cup
