= 2004–05 National Twenty20 Cup =

Cricket tournament

- Dates: 25 – 30 April 2005
- Administrator: Pakistan Cricket Board
- Cricket format: Twenty20
- Tournament format(s): Round-robin and final
- Host: (Pakistan) Lahore
- Champions: Faisalabad Wolves (1st title)
- Participants: 11
- Matches: 19

The 2004–05 ABN-AMRO Twenty-20 Cup was the first edition of the ABN-AMRO Twenty-20 Cup, a domestic Twenty20 tournament in Pakistan sponsored by ABN AMRO bank. It was held from 25 to 30 April 2005 in Lahore. The Faisalabad Wolves won the tournament by defeating the Karachi Dolphins in the final. As the winners, the Faisalabad Wolves were invited to compete in the International 20:20 Club Championship, hosted by Leicestershire County Cricket Club in England, in September 2005, which they also won.

This was the first Twenty20 tournament in the country, after the introduction of the Twenty20 format in 2003. It was huge success with the final having an attendance of 30,000. It helped increase the popularity of cricket in Pakistan and became an annual tournament.

The tournament also involved a match-throwing incident with Sialkot Stallions captain Shoaib Malik.

== Format ==
The eleven teams are divided into three groups: Groups A and B with four teams each and Group C with three. Each team plays a single round-robin tournament and the top team from each group, determined by a point system, advances to the triangular series. The triangular series is another round-robin tournament where the top two teams advance to the final.

Awarded points
Result	Points
Won	2 points
Loss	0 points
No result	1 point

The position of the teams in the points table is determined by:

- Total points
- Won
- Lost (fewest)
- Net run rate

=== Prize money ===
The winners are awarded a trophy and Rs. 300,000 while the runners-up receive Rs. 150,000.

== Results ==
The top team from each group qualify for the triangular series.

Group A
Team	Pld	W	L	NR	Pts	NRR
Karachi Dolphins	3	2	0	1	5	+1.579
Lahore Lions	3	1	1	1	3	+1.585
Peshawar Panthers	3	0	1	2	2	–2.200
Hyderabad Hawks	3	0	1	2	2	–3.530

Group B
Team	Pld	W	L	NR	Pts	NRR
Lahore Eagles	3	2	1	0	4	–0.450
Sialkot Stallions	2	1	1	0	2	+0.969
Karachi Zebras	2	1	1	0	2	+0.283
Multan Tigers	3	1	2	0	2	–0.617

Group C
Team	Pld	W	L	NR	Pts	NRR
Faisalabad Wolves	2	2	0	0	4	+4.000
Rawalpindi Rams	2	1	1	0	2	+1.853
Quetta Bears	2	0	2	0	0	–5.690

Qualified for triangular series

Triangular series
Team	Pld	W	L	NR	Pts	NRR
Karachi Dolphins	2	1	1	0	2	+0.242
Faisalabad Wolves	2	1	1	0	2	+0.117
Lahore Eagles	2	1	1	0	2	–0.348

Qualified for final

== Fixtures ==
All times in Pakistan Standard Time (UTC+05:00)

=== Group stage ===
==== Group A ====
25 April
17:00
Scorecard

Karachi Dolphins; 228/7 (20 overs)	v	Lahore Lions; 190/9 (18 overs)
Moin Khan 112 (58); Sajid Ali 3/45 (4 overs)		Abdul Razzaq 45 (26); Haaris Ayaz 3/32 (4 overs)

Karachi Dolphins won by 16 runs (D/L)
Gaddafi Stadium, Lahore
Umpires: Mohammad Nazir and Zameer Haider

- Karachi Dolphins won the toss and elected to bat.
- Due to power failure, the Lions' target was revised to 207 runs from 18 overs according to the Duckworth–Lewis method.
- Adnan Raza, Agha Sabir, Ahmer Saeed, Amin-ur-Rehman, Fahad Khan, Fahadullah Khan, Faheem Ahmed, Haaris Ayaz, Imran Farhat, Jahangir Mirza, Khurram Manzoor, Malik Aftab, Mohammad Farrukh, Mohammad Yousuf, Moin Khan, Nasir Jamshed, Rashid Riaz, Sajid Ali, Shahnawaz Malik, Sulaman Qadir and Wasim Khan all made their T20 debuts.

25 April
20:30 (D/N)
Scorecard

Hyderabad Hawks; 127 (19.4 overs)	v	Peshawar Panthers; 48/0 (4.5 overs)
Shoaib Laghari 18 (10); Umar Gul 4/21 (3.4 overs)		Fawad Khan 29* (23)

No result
Gaddafi Stadium, Lahore
Umpires: Asad Rauf and Siddiq Khan

- Hyderabad Hawks won the toss and elected to bat.
- Abid Ali, Adnan Brohi, Aftab Alam, Akhtar Sarfraz, Akram Khan, Arshad Khan, Fawad Khan, Hanif Malik, Hanif-ur-Rehman, Iqbal Sheikh, Jannisar Khan, Kashif Raza, Mohammad Aslam, Rafatullah Mohmand, Rizwan Ahmed, Sajid Shah, Shahid Qambrani, Shoaib Khan, Shoaib Laghari, Umar Gul and Wahab Riaz all made their T20 debuts.

26 April
10:00
Scorecard

Hyderabad Hawks; 115/9 (20 overs)	v	Lahore Lions; 116/0 (12.3 overs)
Abid Ali 24 (21); Sajid Ali 4/20 (4 overs)		Shahnawaz Malik 61* (47)

Lahore Lions won by 10 wickets
Lahore City Cricket Association Ground
Umpires: Iftikhar Malik and Rasheed Bhatti

- Lahore Lions won the toss and elected to field.
- Adnan Akmal, Aqeel Anjum, Irfan Fazil, Muntazir Mehdi and Usman Malik all made their T20 debuts.

26 April
17:00
Scorecard

Karachi Dolphins; 178/9 (20 overs)	v	Peshawar Panthers; 134 (19 overs)
Agha Sabir 40 (18); Jannisar Khan 3/18 (4 overs)		Shoaib Khan 23 (15); Faheem Ahmed 3/22 (4 overs)

Karachi Dolphins won by 44 runs
Gaddafi Stadium, Lahore
Umpires: Islam Khan and Mohammad Aslam

- Karachi Dolphins won the toss and elected to bat.

27 April
10:00
Scorecard

Lahore Lions	v	Peshawar Panthers

Match abandoned without a ball bowled
Lahore City Cricket Association Ground
Umpires: Aleem Dar and Nadeem Ghauri

27 April
13:30
Scorecard

Hyderabad Hawks	v	Karachi Dolphins

Match abandoned without a ball bowled
Gaddafi Stadium, Lahore
Umpires: Afzaal Ahmed and Shakeel Khan

==== Group B ====
25 April
13:30
Scorecard

Multan Tigers; 155/6 (20 overs)	v	Karachi Zebras; 114 (19.3 overs)
Yasir Arafat 51 (46); Atif Maqbool 3/20 (4 overs)		Khalid Latif 26 (24); Zeeshan Khan 5/19 (4 overs)

Multan Tigers won by 41 runs
Gaddafi Stadium, Lahore
Umpires: Asad Rauf and Siddiq Khan

- Multan Tigers won the toss and elected to bat.
- Aamer Bashir, Abdur Rauf, Adnan Malik, Afsar Nawaz, Asif Iqbal, Atif Maqbool, Atiq Ahmed, Hasnain Abbas, Javed Qadeer, Kamran Hussain, Khalid Latif, Mohammad Ali, Mohammad Hasnain, Saeed Khan, Shabbir Ahmed, Shadab Kabir, Shahid Latif, Sharjeel Ashraf, Tahir Maqsood, Tariq Haroon, Yasir Arafat and Zeeshan Khan all made their T20 debuts.

26 April
13:30
Scorecard

Sialkot Stallions; 210 (19.5 overs)	v	Lahore Eagles; 215/7 (20 overs)
Imran Nazir 54 (19); Sohail Ahmed 4/20 (4 overs)		Salman Butt 67 (50); Shoaib Malik 2/20 (4 overs)

Lahore Eagles won by 3 wickets
Gaddafi Stadium, Lahore
Umpires: Mohammad Aslam and Zafar Iqbal

- Sialkot Stallions won the toss and elected to bat.
- Aamer Sajjad, Abdur Rehman, Abid Ali, Aizaz Cheema, Ali Azmat, Ali Imran, Ashfaq Ahmed, Bilal Hussain, Fahad Masood, Imran Nazir, Kamran Akmal, Khalid Mahmood, Khaqan Arsal, Naved-ul-Hasan, Nawaz Sardar, Qaiser Abbas, Salman Butt, Shahid Yousaf, Shaiman Anwar, Shoaib Malik, Sohail Ahmed and Waqas Ahmed all made their T20 debuts.

27 April
17:00
Scorecard

Multan Tigers; 110 (18.2 overs)	v	Sialkot Stallions; 112/1 (13 overs)
Yasir Arafat 32 (40); Adeel Malik 4/15 (3 overs)		Bilal Hussain 34 (35); Zeeshan Khan 1/17 (3 overs)

Sialkot Stallions won by 9 wickets
Gaddafi Stadium, Lahore
Umpires: Afzaal Ahmed and Shakeel Khan

- Multan Tigers won the toss and elected to bat.
- Adeel Malik, Sohaib Maqsood and Tariq Mahmood all made their T20 debuts.

27 April
20:30 (D/N)
Scorecard

Karachi Zebras; 185/5 (20 overs)	v	Lahore Eagles; 131 (17.2 overs)
Javed Qadeer 57* (33); Sohail Ahmed 1/15 (4 overs)		Sohail Ahmed 31 (35); Mohammad Hasnain 4/20 (3.2 overs)

Karachi Zebras won by 54 runs
Gaddafi Stadium, Lahore
Umpires: Aleem Dar and Nadeem Ghauri

- Karachi Zebras won the toss and elected to bat.
- Danish Kaneria, Fahad Iqbal and Wasim Naeem all made their T20 debuts.

28 April
13:30
Scorecard

Lahore Eagles; 183/8 (20 overs)	v	Multan Tigers; 161/9 (20 overs)
Taufeeq Umar 64 (54); Shabbir Ahmed 2/17 (4 overs)		Kamran Hussain 66 (37); Sohail Ahmed 4/30 (4 overs)

Lahore Eagles won by 22 runs
Gaddafi Stadium, Lahore
Umpires: Riazuddin and Saleem Badar

- Lahore Eagles won the toss and elected to bat.
- Aqeel Anwar, Azharullah and Naved Yasin all made their T20 debuts.

28 April
17:00
Scorecard

Karachi Zebras; 175/5 (20 overs)	v	Sialkot Stallions; 171/3 (20 overs)
Shadab Kabir 45 (37); Adeel Malik 3/38 (4 overs)		Shoaib Malik 88* (76); Atif Maqbool 1/20 (4 overs)

Karachi Zebras won by 4 runs
Gaddafi Stadium, Lahore
Umpires: Ijaz Ahmed and Riazuddin

- Karachi Zebras won the toss and elected to bat.
- Nadeem Javed and Shahid Siddiq both made their T20 debuts.
- The match referee annulled the points in this match when the Sialkot Stallions captain admitted to deliberately losing the match.

==== Group C ====
25 April
10:00
Scorecard

Rawalpindi Rams; 197/8 (20 overs)	v	Quetta Bears; 101 (16.3 overs)
Raheel Majeed 45 (27); Jamil-ur-Rehman 2/22 (4 overs)		Naseer Khan 25 (19); Shoaib Akhtar 5/23 (4 overs)

Rawalpindi Rams won by 96 runs
Lahore City Cricket Association Ground
Umpires: Mohammad Nazir and Zameer Haider

- Rawalpindi Rams won the toss and elected to bat.
- Abdul Majeed, Ameer Khan, Arun Lal, Bilal Asad, Fayyaz Ahmed, Jalat Khan, Jamil-ur-Rehman, Jawad Hameed, Mohammad Asif, Mohammad Aslam, Naseer Khan, Nasim Khan, Naved Ashraf, Pervez Aziz, Raheel Majeed, Sajid Mahmood, Sanaullah Khan, Shoaib Khan, Sohail Tanvir and Stephen John all made their T20 debuts.

26 April
20:30 (D/N)
Scorecard

Quetta Bears; 95 (18.3 overs)	v	Faisalabad Wolves; 96 (7.4 overs)
Jalat Khan 35 (29); Shahid Nazir 4/11 (3.3 overs)		Mohammad Hafeez 49* (22); Stephen John 1/44 (3 overs)

Faisalabad Wolves won by 9 wickets
Gaddafi Stadium, Lahore
Umpires: Iftikhar Malik and Rasheed Bhatti

- Quetta Bears won the toss and elected to bat.
- Ahmed Hayat, Asif Hussain, Ijaz Ahmed, Imran Khalid, Khurram Shehzad, Manzoor Ahmed, Mohammad Salman, Naved Latif, Saeed Ajmal, Shahid Nazir and Tauqeer Hussain all made their T20 debuts.

28 April
20:30 (D/N)
Scorecard

Rawalpindi Rams; 163/6 (20 overs)	v	Faisalabad Wolves; 167/2 (17.3 overs)
Bilal Asad 42 (41); Imran Khalid 2/37 (4 overs)		Asif Hussain 83* (60); Raheel Majeed 1/24 (1.3 overs)

Faisalabad Wolves won by 8 wickets
Gaddafi Stadium, Lahore
Umpires: Ijaz Ahmed and Saleem Badar

- Rawalpindi Rams won the toss and elected to bat.
- Mohammad Saleem made his T20 debut.

=== Triangular series ===
29 April
10:00
Scorecard

Karachi Dolphins; 141 (19.4 overs)	v	Lahore Eagles; 142/6 (19.2 overs)
Fahadullah Khan 31 (35); Fahad Masood 3/28 (4 overs)		Salman Butt 40 (31); Mohammad Farrukh 2/22 (4 overs)

Lahore Eagles won by 4 wickets
Gaddafi Stadium, Lahore
Umpires: Aleem Dar and Saleem Badar

- Karachi Dolphins won the toss and elected to bat.

29 April
15:00
Scorecard

Lahore Eagles; 160/8 (20 overs)	v	Faisalabad Wolves; 164/5 (18 overs)
Kamran Akmal 34 (26); Tauqeer Hussain 2/29 (3 overs)		Asif Hussain 57 (40); Salman Butt 2/38 (4 overs)

Faisalabad Wolves won by 5 wickets
Gaddafi Stadium, Lahore
Umpires: Asad Rauf and Riazuddin

- Faisalabad Wolves won the toss and elected to field.
- Ali Hussain, Samiullah Khan and Shahid Muzaffar all made their T20 debut.

29 April
20:00 (D/N)
Scorecard

Faisalabad Wolves; 169/7 (20 overs)	v	Karachi Dolphins; 170/4 (18.1 overs)
Imran Ali 42 (19); Faheem Ahmed 3/29 (4 overs)		Fahadullah Khan 61 (47); Mohammad Hafeez 2/33 (4 overs)

Karachi Dolphins won by 6 wickets
Gaddafi Stadium, Lahore
Umpires: Afzaal Ahmed and Nadeem Ghauri

- Karachi Dolphins won the toss and elected to field.
- Fawad Alam and Imran Ali both made their T20 debuts.

=== Final ===
30 April
19:00 (D/N)
Scorecard

Karachi Dolphins; 158/7 (20 overs)	v	Faisalabad Wolves; 159/8 (19.5 overs)
Moin Khan 49 (57); Saeed Ajmal 3/29 (4 overs)		Mohammad Hafeez 38 (35); Haaris Ayaz 2/21 (3.5 overs)

Faisalabad Wolves won by 2 wickets
Gaddafi Stadium, Lahore
Umpires: Aleem Dar and Nadeem Ghauri

- Faisalabad Wolves won the toss and elected to field.

== Match-throwing incident ==
The tournament involved a match-throwing incident in the match between the Sialkot Stallions and the Karachi Zebras. Shoaib Malik, the captain of the Stallions, openly admitted to deliberately losing their match against the Karachi Zebras in an attempt to eliminate the Lahore Eagles from the competition. Neither team received points for the match. PCB declared the match void and Karachi Zebras were denied a place in the triangular phase of the ABN Amro Twenty20 Cup despite winning their Pool 'B' fixture against Sialkot Stallions. Malik was expressing his disappointment at earlier decisions in the competition that he felt went against his side and it did not involve any match-fixing or financial implications.

Malik's actions were against his code of conduct as a Test cricketer and had effect on the image of Pakistan cricket, the sponsors and the audience. After realising this, Malik later apologised. He was banned for one Test match and fined Rs. 10,000 and 75% of his match fees for two One Day International matches.

== Media coverage ==
- Ten Sports (live)
