= List of Karachi Port Trust cricketers =

List of cricketers

This is a list of all cricketers who have played first-class or List A cricket for the Karachi Port Trust cricket team based in Karachi, Pakistan. The team played ten first-class matches and ten List A matches between 2003 and 2005. The list mentions the first and last seasons played by each cricketer; a listed player did not necessarily play in all the intervening seasons.

== Notable players ==
- Aariz Kamal, 2002/03-2005/06
- Adeel Malik, 2003/04-2004/05
- Ahmer Saeed, 2004/05
- Ali Zafar, 2003/04
- Atif Ali, 2002/03-2004/05
- Fahad Iqbal, 2004/05
- Fahad Khan, 2002/03-2004/05
- Fahadullah Khan, 2002/03-2004/05
- Faisal Mirza, 2002/03-2003/04
- Farhan Iqbal, 2003/04
- Haaris Ayaz, 2003/04
- Ibrahim Qureshi, 2004/05
- Iqbal Sheikh, 2002/03-2004/05
- Javed Qadeer, 2004/05
- Maisam Hasnain, 2002/03-2004/05
- Mansoor Ahmed, 2004/05
- Mohammad Farrukh, 2003/04
- Mohammad Hasnain, 2003/04-2004/05
- Nadeem Javed, 2004/05
- Rashid Hanif, 2003/04-2004/05
- Raza Ali Dar, 2003/04-2004/05
- Saad Wasim, 2004/05
- Shadab Kabir, 2003/04-2004/05
- Shahid Iqbal, 2003/04
- Shahid Khan, 2004/05
- Wahab Riaz, 2003/04
- Wajihuddin, 2003/04
