= List of Defence Housing Authority cricketers =

List of cricketers

This is a list of all cricketers who have played first-class or List A cricket for Defence Housing Authority cricket team. The team played ten first-class matches and eleven List A matches between 2003 and 2005. Seasons given are first and last seasons; the player did not necessarily play in all the intervening seasons.

== Notable players ==
- Aamer Iqbal, 2003/04–2004/05
- Agha Sabir, 2004/05
- Anees Sheikh, 2003/04
- Asif Zakir, 2003/04–2004/05
- Asmatullah Mohmand, 2003/04
- Atif Maqbool, 2004/05–2006/07
- Azam Hussain, 2003/04–2004/05
- Faisal Khan, 2004/05
- Fayyaz Shah, 2003/04–2005/06
- Iftikhar Ali, 2003/04
- Iqbal Imam, 2004/05–2005/06
- Malik Aftab, 2003/04–2006/07
- Mohammad Bilal, 2003/04
- Mohammad Farrukh, 2004/05
- Mohtashim Ali, 2003/04–2004/05
- Mubashir Ahmed, 2003/04–2006/07
- Muzaffar Hussain, 2003/04
- Nasir Khan, 2003/04–2005/06
- Rajesh Ramesh, 2004/05
- Riaz Sheikh, 2004/05
- Rizwan Akbar, 2004/05
- Rizwan Qureshi, 2003/04–2005/06
- Rizwan Saeed, 2003/04–2006/07
- Saqib Zia, 2003/04
- Shakeel-ur-Rehman, 2004/05
- Sharjeel Ashraf, 2003/04
- Umair Hasan, 2003/04
- Wajid Ali, 2003/04–2006/07
- Wasim Naeem, 2003/04–2006/07
