= List of Redco Pakistan Limited cricketers =

List of cricketers

This is a list of all cricketers who have played first-class or List A cricket for Redco Pakistan Limited cricket team. The team played ten first-class matches and six List A matches between 1999 and 2000. Seasons given are first and last seasons; the player did not necessarily play in all the intervening seasons.

== Notable players ==
- Adnan Naeem, 1999/00
- Agha Shakeel, 1999/00
- Ahmed Kundi, 1999/00
- Ahmer Saeed, 1999/00
- Atif Mahmood, 1999/00
- Bazid Khan, 1999/00
- Hafeez Qureshi, 1999/00
- Hasnain Qayyum, 1999/00
- Imran Tahir, 1999/00
- Imtiaz-ul-Haq, 1999/00
- Jannisar Khan, 1999/00
- Kashif Raza, 1999/00
- Mohammad Khalil, 1999/00
- Mohammad Naeem, 1999/00
- Mushtaq Ahmed, 1999/00
- Naumanullah, 1999/00
- Naved Ashraf, 1999/00
- Rafatullah Mohmand, 1999/00
- Shabbir Ahmed, 1999/00
- Shabbir Khan, 1999/00
- Shadab Kabir, 1999/00
- Ummar Babari, 1999/00
- Waqar Younis, 1999/00
- Waqas Ahmed, 1999/00
- Wasim Yousufi, 1999/00
- Yasir Arafat, 1999/00
- Zeeshan Pervez, 1999/00
