= List of Pakistan national cricket captains =

This is a list of Pakistani national cricket captains who have represented the Pakistani national cricket team in international cricket at a professional level. Pakistan became an official member of the Imperial Cricket Conference (now the International Cricket Council) on 28 July 1952.

The team's greatest successes in One Day International cricket arrived in 1992, when they won the World Cup under the captaincy of Imran Khan. Their most important Twenty20 cricket success came in 2009 when they won the 2009 ICC World Twenty20, under the leadership of Younis Khan and another important victory is the 2017 ICC Champions Trophy under the leadership of Sarfraz Ahmed. Babar Azam is the only Pakistan captain who has scored centuries in all formats as a captain. Babar Azam now has the most centuries for Pakistan as a captain.

== Men's cricket ==
=== Test cricket captains ===
This is a list of cricketers who have captained the Pakistan national cricket team for at least one Test match (not including vice-captains and other players who have deputised on the field for any period of time during a match where the captain has been unable to play).

Where a player has a dagger (†) next to a Test match series in which he captained at least one Test, that denotes that player deputized for the appointed captain or were appointed by the home authority for a minor proportion in a series.

The current captain is Babar Azam who was made the captain in 2026 before the West Indies and England series.

Pakistan Test match captains
Number	Name	Year	Opposition	Location	Played	Won	Lost	Drawn
1	Abdul Hafeez Kardar	1952/53	India	India	5	1	2	2
1	Abdul Hafeez Kardar	1954	England	England	4	1	1	2
1	Abdul Hafeez Kardar	1954/55	India	Pakistan	5	0	0	5
1	Abdul Hafeez Kardar	1955/56	New Zealand	Pakistan	3	2	0	1
1	Abdul Hafeez Kardar	1956/57	Australia	Pakistan	1	1	0	0
1	Abdul Hafeez Kardar	1957/58	West Indies	West Indies	5	1	3	1
1	Abdul Hafeez Kardar	Total			23	6	6	11
2	Fazal Mahmood	1958/59	West Indies	Pakistan	3	2	1	0
2	Fazal Mahmood	1959/60	Australia	Pakistan	2	0	1	1
2	Fazal Mahmood	1960/61	India	India	5	0	0	5
2	Fazal Mahmood	Total			10	2	2	6
3	Imtiaz Ahmed	1959/60†	Australia	Pakistan	1	0	1	0
3	Imtiaz Ahmed	1961/62	England	Pakistan	3	0	1	2
3	Imtiaz Ahmed	Total			4	0	2	2
4	Javed Burki	1962	England	England	5	0	4	1
4	Javed Burki	Total			5	0	4	1
5	Hanif Mohammad	1964/65	Australia	Pakistan	1	0	0	1
5	Hanif Mohammad	1964/65	Australia	Australia	1	0	0	1
5	Hanif Mohammad	1964/65	New Zealand	New Zealand	3	0	0	3
5	Hanif Mohammad	1964/65	New Zealand	Pakistan	3	2	0	1
5	Hanif Mohammad	1967	England	England	3	0	2	1
5	Hanif Mohammad	Total			11	2	2	7
6	Saeed Ahmed	1968/69	England	Pakistan	3	0	0	3
6	Saeed Ahmed	Total			3	0	0	3
7	Intikhab Alam	1969/70	New Zealand	Pakistan	3	0	1	2
7	Intikhab Alam	1971	England	England	3	0	1	2
7	Intikhab Alam	1972/73	Australia	Australia	3	0	3	0
7	Intikhab Alam	1972/73	New Zealand	New Zealand	3	1	0	2
7	Intikhab Alam	1974	England	England	3	0	0	3
7	Intikhab Alam	1974/75	West Indies	Pakistan	2	0	0	2
7	Intikhab Alam	Total			17	1	5	11
8	Majid Khan	1972/73	England	Pakistan	3	0	0	3
8	Majid Khan	Total			3	0	0	3
9	Mushtaq Mohammad	1976/77	New Zealand	Pakistan	3	2	0	1
9	Mushtaq Mohammad	1976/77	Australia	Australia	3	1	1	1
9	Mushtaq Mohammad	1976/77	West Indies	West Indies	5	1	2	2
9	Mushtaq Mohammad	1978/79	India	Pakistan	3	2	0	1
9	Mushtaq Mohammad	1978/79	New Zealand	New Zealand	3	1	0	2
9	Mushtaq Mohammad	1978/79	Australia	Australia	2	1	1	0
9	Mushtaq Mohammad	Total			19	8	4	7
10	Wasim Bari	1977/78	England	Pakistan	3	0	0	3
10	Wasim Bari	1978	England	England	3	0	2	1
10	Wasim Bari	Total			6	0	2	4
11	Asif Iqbal	1979/80	India	India	6	0	2	4
11	Asif Iqbal	Total			6	0	2	4
12	Javed Miandad	1979/80	Australia	Pakistan	3	1	0	2
12	Javed Miandad	1980/81	West Indies	Pakistan	4	0	1	3
12	Javed Miandad	1981/82	Australia	Australia	3	1	2	0
12	Javed Miandad	1981/82	Sri Lanka	Pakistan	3	2	0	1
12	Javed Miandad	1984/85	New Zealand	New Zealand	3	0	2	1
12	Javed Miandad	1985/86	Sri Lanka	Pakistan	3	2	0	1
12	Javed Miandad	1987/88	England	Pakistan	3	1	0	2
12	Javed Miandad	1988/89	Australia	Pakistan	3	1	0	2
12	Javed Miandad	1990/91	New Zealand	Pakistan	3	3	0	0
12	Javed Miandad	1992	England	England	5	2	1	2
12	Javed Miandad	1992/93	New Zealand	New Zealand	1	1	0	0
12	Javed Miandad	Total			34	14	6	14
13	Imran Khan	1982	England	England	3	1	2	0
13	Imran Khan	1982/83	Australia	Pakistan	3	3	0	0
13	Imran Khan	1982/83	India	Pakistan	6	3	0	3
13	Imran Khan	1985/86	Sri Lanka	Sri Lanka	3	1	1	1
13	Imran Khan	1986/87	West Indies	Pakistan	3	1	1	1
13	Imran Khan	1986/87	India	India	5	1	0	4
13	Imran Khan	1987	England	England	5	1	0	4
13	Imran Khan	1987/88	West Indies	West Indies	3	1	1	1
13	Imran Khan	1988/89	New Zealand	New Zealand	2	0	0	2
13	Imran Khan	1989/90	India	Pakistan	4	0	0	4
13	Imran Khan	1989/90	Australia	Australia	3	0	1	2
13	Imran Khan	1990/91	West Indies	Pakistan	3	1	1	1
13	Imran Khan	1991/92	Sri Lanka	Pakistan	3	1	0	2
13	Imran Khan	Total			48	14	8	26
14	Zaheer Abbas	1983/84	India	India	3	0	0	3
14	Zaheer Abbas	1983/84	Australia	Australia	5	0	2	3
14	Zaheer Abbas	1983/84	England	Pakistan	3	1	0	2
14	Zaheer Abbas	1984/85	India	Pakistan	2	0	0	2
14	Zaheer Abbas	1984/85	New Zealand	Pakistan	3	2	0	1
14	Zaheer Abbas	Total			14	3	1	10
15	Wasim Akram	1992/93	West Indies	West Indies	3	0	2	1
15	Wasim Akram	1993/94	Zimbabwe	Pakistan	2	1	0	1
15	Wasim Akram	1995/96	Australia	Australia	3	1	2	0
15	Wasim Akram	1995/96	New Zealand	New Zealand	1	1	0	0
15	Wasim Akram	1996	England	England	3	2	0	1
15	Wasim Akram	1996/97	Zimbabwe	Pakistan	2	1	0	1
15	Wasim Akram	1997/98	West Indies	Pakistan	3	3	0	0
15	Wasim Akram	1998/99	India	India	2	1	1	0
15	Wasim Akram	1998/99^{1}	India	India	1	1	0	0
15	Wasim Akram	1998/99^{1}	Sri Lanka	Pakistan	1	0	0	1
15	Wasim Akram	1998/99^{2}	Sri Lanka	Bangladesh	1	1	0	0
15	Wasim Akram	1999/2000	Australia	Australia	3	0	3	0
15	Wasim Akram	Total			25	12	8	5
16	Waqar Younis	1993/94†	Zimbabwe	Pakistan	1	1	0	0
16	Waqar Younis	2001	England	England	2	1	1	0
16	Waqar Younis	2001/02^{1}	Bangladesh	Pakistan	1	1	0	0
16	Waqar Younis	2001/02	Bangladesh	Bangladesh	2	2	0	0
16	Waqar Younis	2001/02	West Indies	United Arab Emirates	2	2	0	0
16	Waqar Younis	2001/02^{2}	Sri Lanka	Pakistan	1	0	1	0
16	Waqar Younis	2002	New Zealand	Pakistan	1	1	0	0
16	Waqar Younis	2002/03	Australia	Sri Lanka	1	0	1	0
16	Waqar Younis	2002/03	Australia	Sharjah	2	0	2	0
16	Waqar Younis	2002/03	Zimbabwe	Zimbabwe	2	2	0	0
16	Waqar Younis	2002/03	South Africa	South Africa	2	0	2	0
16	Waqar Younis	Total			17	10	7	0
17	Saleem Malik	1993/94	New Zealand	New Zealand	3	2	1	0
17	Saleem Malik	1994	Sri Lanka	Sri Lanka	2	2	0	0
17	Saleem Malik	1994/95	Australia	Pakistan	3	1	0	2
17	Saleem Malik	1994/95	South Africa	South Africa	1	0	1	0
17	Saleem Malik	1994/95	Zimbabwe	Zimbabwe	3	2	1	0
17	Saleem Malik	Total			12	7	3	2
18	Rameez Raja	1995/6	Sri Lanka	Pakistan	3	1	2	0
18	Rameez Raja	1996/97	Sri Lanka	Sri Lanka	2	0	0	2
18	Rameez Raja	Total			5	1	2	2
19	Saeed Anwar	1996/07	New Zealand	Pakistan	2	1	1	0
19	Saeed Anwar	1997/98	South Africa	Pakistan	3	0	1	2
19	Saeed Anwar	1999/2000	Sri Lanka	Pakistan	2	0	2	0
19	Saeed Anwar	Total			7	1	4	2
20	Aamer Sohail	1997/98	South Africa	South Africa	2	1	0	1
20	Aamer Sohail	1998/99	Australia	Pakistan	3	0	1	2
20	Aamer Sohail	1998/99	Zimbabwe	Zimbabwe	1	0	1	0
20	Aamer Sohail	Total			6	1	2	3
21	Rashid Latif	1997/98†	South Africa	South Africa	1	0	1	0
21	Rashid Latif	1997/98	Zimbabwe	Zimbabwe	2	1	0	1
21	Rashid Latif	2003/04	Bangladesh	Pakistan	3	3	0	0
21	Rashid Latif	Total			6	4	1	1
22	Moin Khan	1997/8†	Zimbabwe	Zimbabwe	1	0	0	1
22	Moin Khan	1999/2000†	Sri Lanka	Pakistan	1	1	0	0
22	Moin Khan	1999/2000	West Indies	West Indies	3	0	1	2
22	Moin Khan	2000	Sri Lanka	Sri Lanka	3	2	0	1
22	Moin Khan	2000/01	England	Pakistan	3	0	1	2
22	Moin Khan	2000/01	New Zealand	New Zealand	2	1	0	1
22	Moin Khan	Total			13	4	2	7
23	Inzamam-ul-Haq	2000/01†	New Zealand	New Zealand	1	0	1	0
23	Inzamam-ul-Haq	2003/04†	South Africa	Pakistan	1	0	0	1
23	Inzamam-ul-Haq	2003/04	New Zealand	New Zealand	2	1	0	1
23	Inzamam-ul-Haq	2003/04	India	Pakistan	3	1	2	0
23	Inzamam-ul-Haq	2004/05	Sri Lanka	Pakistan	2	1	1	0
23	Inzamam-ul-Haq	2004/05†	Australia	Australia	1	0	1	0
23	Inzamam-ul-Haq	2004/05	India	India	3	1	1	1
23	Inzamam-ul-Haq	2004/05	West Indies	West Indies	1	1	0	0
23	Inzamam-ul-Haq	2005/06	England	Pakistan	3	2	0	1
23	Inzamam-ul-Haq	2005/06	India	Pakistan	2	0	0	2
23	Inzamam-ul-Haq	2005/06	Sri Lanka	Sri Lanka	2	1	0	1
23	Inzamam-ul-Haq	2006	England	England	4	0	3^{3}	1
23	Inzamam-ul-Haq	2006/07	West Indies	Pakistan	3	2	0	1
23	Inzamam-ul-Haq	2006/07	South Africa	South Africa	3	1	2	0
23	Inzamam-ul-Haq	Total			31	11	11^{3}	9
24	Mohammad Yousuf	2003/04	South Africa	Pakistan	1	1	0	0
24	Mohammad Yousuf	2004/05	Australia	Australia	2	0	2	0
24	Mohammad Yousuf	2009/10	New Zealand	New Zealand	3	1	1	1
24	Mohammad Yousuf	2009/10	Australia	Australia	3	0	3	0
24	Mohammad Yousuf	Total			9	2	6	1
25	Younus Khan	2004/05†	West Indies	West Indies	1	0	1	0
25	Younus Khan	2005/06†	India	Pakistan	1	1	0	0
25	Younus Khan	2007/08†	India	India	2	0	0	2
25	Younus Khan	2008/09	Sri Lanka	Pakistan	2	0	0	2
25	Younus Khan	2009	Sri Lanka	Sri Lanka	3	0	2	1
25	Younus Khan	Total			9	1	3	5
26	Shoaib Malik	2007/08	South Africa	Pakistan	2	0	1	1
26	Shoaib Malik	2007/08	India	India	1	0	1	0
26	Shoaib Malik	Total			3	0	2	1
27	Shahid Afridi	2009/10	Australia	England	1	0	1	0
27	Shahid Afridi	Total			1	0	1	0
28	Salman Butt	2009/10	Australia	England	1	1	0	0
28	Salman Butt	2009/10	England	England	4	1	3	0
28	Salman Butt	Total			5	2	3	0
29	Misbah-ul-Haq	2011/12	South Africa	United Arab Emirates	2	0	0	2
29	Misbah-ul-Haq	2011/12	New Zealand	New Zealand	2	1	0	1
29	Misbah-ul-Haq	2011/12	West Indies	West Indies	2	1	1	0
29	Misbah-ul-Haq	2011/12	Zimbabwe	Zimbabwe	1	1	0	0
29	Misbah-ul-Haq	2011/12	Sri Lanka	United Arab Emirates	3	1	0	2
29	Misbah-ul-Haq	2011/12	Bangladesh	Bangladesh	2	2	0	0
29	Misbah-ul-Haq	2012/13	England	United Arab Emirates	3	3	0	0
29	Misbah-ul-Haq	2012/13	Sri Lanka	Sri Lanka	2	0	0	2
29	Misbah-ul-Haq	2012/13	South Africa	South Africa	3	0	3	0
29	Misbah-ul-Haq	2013/14	Zimbabwe	Zimbabwe	2	1	1	0
29	Misbah-ul-Haq	2013/14	South Africa	United Arab Emirates	2	1	1	0
29	Misbah-ul-Haq	2013/14	Sri Lanka	United Arab Emirates	3	1	1	1
29	Misbah-ul-Haq	2014	Sri Lanka	Sri Lanka	2	0	2	0
29	Misbah-ul-Haq	2014	Australia	United Arab Emirates	2	2	0	0
29	Misbah-ul-Haq	2014	New Zealand	United Arab Emirates	3	1	1	1
29	Misbah-ul-Haq	2015	Bangladesh	Bangladesh	2	1	0	1
29	Misbah-ul-Haq	2015	Sri Lanka	Sri Lanka	3	2	1	0
29	Misbah-ul-Haq	2015	England	United Arab Emirates	3	2	0	1
29	Misbah-ul-Haq	2016	England	England	4	2	2	0
29	Misbah-ul-Haq	2016	West Indies	United Arab Emirates	3	2	1	0
29	Misbah-ul-Haq	2016	New Zealand	New Zealand	1	0	1	0
29	Misbah-ul-Haq	2016/17	Australia	Australia	3	0	3	0
29	Misbah-ul-Haq	2017	West Indies	West Indies	3	2	1	0
29	Misbah-ul-Haq	Total			56	26	19	11
30	Mohammad Hafeez	2012/13	Sri Lanka	Sri Lanka	1	0	1	0
30	Mohammad Hafeez	Total			1	0	1	0
31	Azhar Ali	2016	New Zealand	New Zealand	1	0	1	0
31	Azhar Ali	2019/20	Australia	Australia	2	0	2	0
31	Azhar Ali	2019/20	Sri Lanka	Pakistan	2	1	0	1
31	Azhar Ali	2020	Bangladesh	Pakistan	1	1	0	0
31	Azhar Ali	2020	England	England	3	0	1	2
31	Azhar Ali	Total			9	2	4	3
32	Sarfraz Ahmed	2017/18	Sri Lanka	United Arab Emirates	2	0	2	0
32	Sarfraz Ahmed	2017	Ireland	Ireland	1	1	0	0
32	Sarfraz Ahmed	2018	England	England	2	1	1	0
32	Sarfraz Ahmed	2018/19	Australia	United Arab Emirates	2	1	0	1
32	Sarfraz Ahmed	2018/19	New Zealand	United Arab Emirates	3	1	2	0
32	Sarfraz Ahmed	2018/19	South Africa	South Africa	3	0	3	0
32	Sarfraz Ahmed	Total			13	4	8	1
33	Mohammad Rizwan	2020/21	New Zealand	New Zealand	2	0	2	0
33	Mohammad Rizwan	Total			2	0	2	0
34	Babar Azam	2020/21	South Africa	Pakistan	2	2	0	0
34	Babar Azam	2021	Zimbabwe	Zimbabwe	2	2	0	0
34	Babar Azam	2021	West Indies	West Indies	2	1	1	0
34	Babar Azam	2021	Bangladesh	Bangladesh	2	2	0	0
34	Babar Azam	2022	Australia	Pakistan	3	0	1	2
34	Babar Azam	2022	Sri Lanka	Sri Lanka	2	1	1	0
34	Babar Azam	2022	England	Pakistan	3	0	3	0
34	Babar Azam	2022/2023	New Zealand	Pakistan	2	0	0	2
34	Babar Azam	2023	Sri Lanka	Sri Lanka	2	2	0	0
34	Babar Azam	2026	West Indies	Pakistan	2	1	1	0
34	Babar Azam	2026	England	England	2	0	2	0
Total			24	11	9	4		
35	Shan Masood	2023/24	Australia	Australia	3	0	3	0
35	Shan Masood	2024/25	Bangladesh	Pakistan	2	0	2	0
35	Shan Masood	2024/25	England	Pakistan	3	2	1	0
35	Shan Masood	2024/25	South Africa	South Africa	2	0	2	0
35	Shan Masood	2025	West Indies	Pakistan	2	1	1	0
35	Shan Masood	2025/26	South Africa	Pakistan	2	1	1	0
35	Shan Masood	2026	Bangladesh	Bangladesh	2	0	2	0
35	Shan Masood	Total			16	4	12	0
36	Salman Ali Agha	2026	England	England	1	0	1	0
36	Salman Ali Agha	Total			1	0	1	0

Notes:

- ^{1} Asian Test Championship
- ^{2} Final of the Asian Test Championship
- ^{3} Includes one forfeited match.

=== Men's One Day International Captains ===
This is a list of cricketers who have captained the Pakistan national cricket team for at least one One Day International. The table of results is complete to the end of the Micromax Asia Cup. Pakistan's most successful One Day captain in terms of number of won matches is Imran Khan, who retired after lifting the 1992 cricket World Cup. The current captain is Shaheen Shah Afridi, who was appointed captain in October 2025 and replaced Mohammad Rizwan.

Pakistani One Day International captains
Number	Image	Name	Year	Played	Won	Tied	Lost	NR	Win %
1		Intikhab Alam	1972-1974	3	2	0	1	0	67.33%
2		Asif Iqbal	1975–1979	6	2	0	4	0	33.33%
3		Majid Khan	1975	2	1	0	1	0	50%
4		Mushtaq Mohammad	1976-1979	4	2	0	2	0	50%
5		Wasim Bari	1977-1978	5	1	0	4	0	20%
6		Javed Miandad	1980-1993	62	26	1	33	2	44.16%
7		Zaheer Abbas	1981-1985	13	7	0	5	1	58.23%
8		Imran Khan	1982-1992	139	75	1	59	4	55.92%
9		Sarfraz Nawaz	1983-1984	1	0	0	1	0	0%
10		Abdul Qadir	1987-1989	5	1	0	4	0	20%
11		Saleem Malik	1992-1995	34	21	2	11	0	64.70%
12		Rameez Raja	1992–1997	22	7	0	13	2	35.00%
13		Wasim Akram	1992-2000	109	66	2	41	0	61.46%
14		Waqar Younis	1993-2003	62	37	0	23	2	60.61%
15		Moin Khan	1994-2001	34	20	0	14	0	58.82%
16		Saeed Anwar	1994-2000	11	5	0	6	0	45.45%
17		Aamer Sohail	1995-1999	22	9	0	12	1	42.85%
18		Rashid Latif	1997-2003	25	13	0	12	0	52.00%
19		Inzamam-ul-Haq	2002-2007	87	51	0	33	3	60.71%
20		Mohammad Yousuf	2003-2010	8	2	0	6	0	25.00%
21		Younis Khan	2005–2009	21	8	0	13	0	38.09%
22		Abdul Razzaq	2006	1	0	0	1	0	0%
23		Shoaib Malik	2007–2019	41	25	0	16	0	60.97%
24		Misbah-ul-Haq	2008–2015	87	45	2	39	1	51.72%
25		Shahid Afridi	2009–2014	38	19	0	18	1	51.35%
26		Azhar Ali	2015–2017	31	12	0	18	1	38.70%
27		Sarfraz Ahmed	2015–2019	50	28	0	20	2	56.00%
28		Mohammad Hafeez	2017	2	1	0	1	0	50.00%
29		Imad Wasim	2019	2	0	0	2	0	0.00%
30		Babar Azam	2020–2023	43	26	1	15	1	60.46%
31		Mohammad Rizwan	2023-2025	20	9	11	0	0	45.00%
32		Shaheen Shah Afridi	2025-Present	9	6	3	0	0	66.66%
Grand total				999	527	9	442	21	52.75%
Statistics are correct as of Bangladesh v Pakistan 2026

=== Men's Twenty20 International captains ===
This is a list of cricketers who have captained the Pakistani national cricket team for at least one Twenty20 International (T20I). The current captain is Salman Ali Agha who replaced Mohammad Rizwan.

Pakistani Twenty20 International captains
Number	Photo	Name	Year	Played	Won	Lost	Tied	No result	Win %
1		Inzamam-ul-Haq	2006-2007	1	1	0	0	0	100.00%
2		Younis Khan	2007–2009	8	5	3	0	0	62.50%
3		Shoaib Malik	2007	20	13	6	1	0	67.50%
4		Misbah-ul-Haq	2011–2012	8	6	2	0	0	75.00%
5		Shahid Afridi	2009–2016	43	19	23	1	0	45.34%
6		Mohammad Hafeez	2012–2014	29	17	11	1	0	60.34%
7		Sarfraz Ahmed	2016–2020	37	29	8	0	0	78.37%
8		Babar Azam	2019-2024	85	48	29	1	7	62.17%
9		Shadab Khan	2020–2023	6	2	4	0	0	33.33%
10		Shaheen Afridi	2024	5	1	4	0	0	20.00%
11		Mohammad Rizwan	2023	4	0	4		0	0%
12		Salman Ali Agha	2024-2026	46	27	17	0	2	58.69%
13		Sahibzada Farhan	2026-						
Total				295	169	113	4	10	57.28%
Stats are true till T20 World Cup 2026.

== Women's cricket ==
=== Test cricket captains ===
This is a list of cricketers who have captained the Pakistani women's cricket team for at least one women's Test match. The table of results is complete to the Test as of June 2005.

Pakistani women's Test cricket captains
Number	Name	Year	Opposition	Location	Played	Won	Lost	Drawn
1	Shaiza Khan	1997/8	Sri Lanka	Sri Lanka	1	0	1	0
1	Shaiza Khan	2000	Ireland	Ireland	1	0	1	0
1	Shaiza Khan	2003/4	West Indies	Pakistan	1	0	0	1
1	Shaiza Khan	Grand total			3	0	2	1

=== Women's One Day International captains ===
This is a list of cricketers who have captained the Pakistani women's cricket team for at least one women's one-day international. The table of results is complete as of present(2017). Pakistan have only ever competed in one World Cup, that of 1997/8, when they finished bottom of their qualifying group. The current Captain is Nida Dar. She was appointed since April 2023.

Pakistani women's One Day International captains
Number	Image	Name	Year	Played	Won	Tied	Lost	No result
1		Shaiza Khan	1997–2004	39	7	0	32	0
2		Sadia Butt	2003	1	1	0	0	0
3		Sana Javed	2005–06	4	0	0	4	0
4		Urooj Mumtaz	2006–2009	26	4	0	21	1
5		Sana Mir	2009–2017	72	26	0	45	1
6		Bismah Maroof	2013 – present	18	10	1	6	1
7		Javeria Khan	2018–2021	8	0	0	8	0
Grand total			168	48	1	116	3	

== Youth cricket ==
=== Under-19 Test captains ===
captained the Pakistani Under-19 cricket team for at least one under-19 Test match. The table of results is complete to the second Test against Sri Lanka in 2004/5. A cricketer who has a symbol of ♠ next to a Test match series describes their role as captain and their participation in at least one game for the team. The rules of the Under-19 cricket describes no youth, captains the side for more than one year. The current Captain is Qasim Akram. He is appointed in April 2021.

Pakistani Under-19 Test cricket captains
Number	Name	Year	Opposition	Location	Played	Won	Lost	Drawn
1	Javed Qureshi	1978/9	India	India	5	0	0	5
2	Rameez Raja	1980/1	Australia	Pakistan	3	2	0	1
3	Saleem Malik	1981/2	Australia	Australia	3	1	0	2
4	Basit Ali	1988/9	India	Pakistan	4	0	1	3
5	Moin Khan	1989/90	India	India	4	0	1	3
5	Moin Khan	1990	England	England	3	0	1	2
5	Moin Khan	Total			7	0	2	5
6	Aaley Haider	1991/2	England	Pakistan	2	1	1	0
7	Mohammad Afzal	1991/2♠	England	Pakistan	1	0	0	1
8	Qayyum-ul-Hasan	1993/4	New Zealand	New Zealand	3	0	0	3
9	Maisam Hasnain	1994/5	New Zealand	Pakistan	3	0	0	3
10	Naved-ul-Hasan	1995/6	West Indies	Pakistan	3	0	2	1
11	Mohammad Wasim	1996/7	West Indies	West Indies	3	0	0	3
12	Shadab Kabir	1996/7	England	Pakistan	2	0	1	1
13	Ahmer Saeed	1996/7♠	England	Pakistan	1	0	0	1
13	Ahmer Saeed	1996/7	South Africa	South Africa	3	2	0	1
13	Ahmer Saeed	1996/7	Australia	Pakistan	3	1	1	1
13	Ahmer Saeed	Total			7	3	1	3
14	Bazid Khan	1997/8	Australia	Australia	3	0	0	3
14	Bazid Khan	1998	England	England	3	1	2	0
14	Bazid Khan	Total			6	1	2	3
15	Hasan Raza	1999	South Africa	Pakistan	3	1	0	2
16	Khalid Latif	2003	Sri Lanka	Sri Lanka	2	0	0	2
17	Jahangir Mirza	2005	Sri Lanka	Pakistan	2	0	0	2
18	Mohammad Ibrahim	2006	India	Pakistan	2	0	2	0
19	Imad Wasim	2007	Pakistan	England	2	1	1	0
19	Imad Wasim	2007	Bangladesh	Pakistan	1	0	0	1
19	Imad Wasim	Total			3	1	1	1
20	Imran Rafiq	2015	Sri Lanka	Sri Lanka	2	0	0	2
21	Qasim Akram	2021	Bangladesh	Bangladesh	0	0	0	0
Grand total					66	10	13	43

=== Under-19 One Day International captains ===
This is a list of cricketers who have captained the Pakistani Under-19 cricket team for at least one Under-19 One Day International. The current Captain is Qasim Akram. He is appointed in April 2021.

Pakistani Under-19 One Day International captains
Number	Name	Year	Played	Won	Tied	Lost	No result
1	Saleem Malik	1981/82	2	1	0	1	0
2	Zahoor Elahi	1987/88	9	6	0	3	0
3	Ghulam Pasha	1989/90	2	0	0	2	0
4	Moin Khan	1989/90-1990	4	2	0	2	0
5	Aaley Haider	1991/2	3	3	0	0	0
6	Qayyum-ul-Hasan	1993/4	3	2	0	1	0
7	Maisam Hasnain	1994/5	3	1	0	2	0
8	Naved-ul-Hasan	1995/6	3	2	0	1	0
9	Mohammad Wasim	1996/7	3	1	0	2	0
10	Ahmer Saeed	1996/7	6	2	1	3	0
11	Bazid Khan	1997/8-1998	12	4	0	7	1
12	Hasan Raza	1998/9-1999/2000	8	7	0	1	0
13	Salman Butt	2001/2	9	7	0	2	0
14	Junaid Zia	2001/2	2	1	0	1	0
15	Khalid Latif	2003-2003/4	16	12	0	4	0
16	Jahangir Mirza	2004/5	3	1	0	2	0
17	Sarfraz Ahmed	2005/6	15	10	0	5	0
18	Mohammad Rizwan	2006/7	23	13	0	10	0
19	Imad Wasim	2006	26	18	0	7	1
20	Ahmed Shehzad	2007	5	2	0	3	0
21	Azeem Ghumman	2009/10	16	11	0	4	1
22	Babar Azam	2012	21	13	1	7	0
23	Sami Aslam	2013/14	19	15	0	3	1
24	Imran Rafiq	2015/16	4	0	0	3	1
25	Gauhar Hafeez	2015/16	8	6	0	2	0
26	Zeeshan Malik	2015/16	2	1	0	1	0
27	Nasir Nawaz	2016/17	1	1	0	0	0
28	Hasan Khan	2017/18	13	8	0	4	1
29	Rohail Nazir	2018/19	21	13	0	7	1
30	Qasim Akram	2021/22	0	0	0	0	0
Grand total			246	152	2	85	7

== See also ==
- Pakistan national cricket team
- Pakistan Under-19 cricket team
- Pakistan national women's cricket team
