= List of Attock Group cricketers =

List of cricketers

This is a list of all cricketers who have played first-class cricket matches for Attock Group cricket team. The team played four first-class matches in 2006. Seasons given are first and last seasons; the player did not necessarily play in all the intervening seasons.

== Notable players ==
- Abdul Mannan, 2006/07
- Alamgir Khan, 2006/07
- Ameer Khan, 2006/07
- Asim Iqbal Butt, 2006/07
- Mohammad Asim Butt, 2006/07
- Babar Naeem, 2006/07
- Imran Ali, 2006/07
- Khurram Shehzad, 2006/07
- Manzoor Ali, 2006/07
- Mohammad Ibrahim, 2006/07
- Mohammad Rameez, 2006/07
- Nauman Aman, 2006/07
- Pervez Aziz, 2006/07
- Saad Altaf, 2006/07
- Sajid Mahmood, 2006/07
- Sohail Tanvir, 2006/07
- Tariq Mahmood, 2006/07
- Zohaib Ahmed, 2006/07

Qadeer ahmed 2015/2019 UAE
