= Arsalan Anwar =

Pakistani cricketer (born 1986)

Personal information
- Born: 4 November 1986 (age 40); Sialkot, Punjab, Pakistan
- Batting: Right-handed
- Bowling: Right-arm
- Role: Batsman, occasional wicket-keeper
- Relatives: Shaiman Anwar (brother)

Domestic team information
- Years: Team
- 2007: Sialkot
- 2017: Munster Reds

Career statistics
| Competition | First-class |
|---|---|
| Matches | 2 |
| Runs scored | 41 |
| Batting average | 10.25 |
| 100s/50s | 0/0 |
| Top score | 17 |
| Catches/stumpings | 1/0 |
- Source: CricketArchive, 19 February 2015

Arsalan Anwar (born 4 November 1986) is a Pakistani cricketer. He scored a century in his only Test innings for the Pakistani national under-19 side, played two first-class matches for Sialkot during the 2007–08 season, and later moved to Ireland where he played Twenty20 matches for Munster Reds.

Born in Sialkot, Punjab, Arsalan made his debut for the Sialkot District under-19s in July 2003, aged 16. A right-handed batsman, he played in the 2003–04 Inter-Region Tournament, scoring consecutive innings of 88 not out and 99 against Quetta and Multan. In the same tournament the following season, he had a run of six consecutive scores of 50+ runs (four half-centuries and two centuries) – 66 and 54* in a three-day match against Rawalpindi, 67* in a one-dayer against Faisalabad, 123 and 84* in a three-day match against the same team, and finally 112 in a three-day match against Quetta.

The Sri Lankan under-19s toured Pakistan late in the 2004–05 season, playing two under-19 Tests and three under-19 One Day Internationals (ODIs) in March and April 2005. Arsalan was selected in Pakistan's squad for the tour. He did not play in the first Test, but was one of three inclusions for the second – he, Nawaz Sardar, and Zohaib Ahmed came into the side, while Abid Ali, Nauman Alavi, and Uzair-ul-Haq were excluded. In the match, played at the Multan Cricket Stadium, Arsalan came in seventh in the batting order, with the score at 118/5. He proceeded to score 103* from 216 balls, including thirteen boundaries, and featured in a 143-run sixth-wicket stand with Fawad Alam, who scored 75. Arsalan did not bat again in Pakistan's second innings, as the match was drawn after four days. Having not been dismissed in his only innings, he finished his career without a batting average. Arsalan was less successful in the three ODIs on tour, with 62 runs in total and a best of 38.

Arsalan played for the Sialkot under-19s during the 2005–06 season, captaining the side at both inter-district and inter-regional level. In the inter-district tournament, he scored 160 against Mandi Bahauddin District and 102* against Gujrat District, and in inter-region one-day matches, he scored 105* against Rawalpindi, 104 against Peshawar, and 91* against Karachi Urban. Arsalan finished the latter tournament with 373 runs at an average of 93.25, the most of any player. Later in the season, he made his senior debut in Pakistani domestic tournaments, scoring a century on debut for Pakistan Army in Grade II of the Patron's Trophy. After playing for Sialkot's senior side in inter-district matches over the preceding seasons, Arsalan was selected to make his first-class debut during the 2007–08 season of the Quaid-i-Azam Trophy. In his two matches, against Habib Bank and Pakistan Customs, he scored only 41 runs, finishing his career with an average of 10.25. Arsalan played no further high-level matches for Sialkot, with his last recorded game coming in July 2008, an inter-district fixture against Gujranwala District.

He made his Twenty20 cricket debut for Munster Reds in the 2017 Inter-Provincial Trophy on 16 June 2017 against Leinster. He played his second, and to date final, T20 appearance a week later against North West Warriors. He skippered Limerick Cricket Club in the 2020 season.

Arsalan's older brother, Shaiman Anwar, is an international cricketer for the United Arab Emirates.
