= Rizwan Akbar =

Pakistani cricketer (born 1986)

Personal information
- Full name: Rizwan Akbar
- Born: 15 December 1986 (age 39); Rawalpindi, Punjab, Pakistan
- Batting: Right-handed
- Bowling: Right-arm medium-fast
- Role: Bowler

Domestic team information
- Years: Team
- 2003/04–2018/19: Rawalpindi
- 2004/05–2014/15: Rawalpindi Rams
- 2013/14–2017/18: Pakistan Television
- Source: Cricinfo, 1 May 2026

Rizwan Akbar (born 15 December 1986) is a Pakistani former cricketer. Akbar is a right-handed batsman who bowls right-arm medium-fast. He was born in Rawalpindi, Punjab.

Akbar made his first-class debut for Rawalpindi against Sialkot in the 2003–04 Quaid-e-Azam Trophy on 8 March 2004. He made his List A debut for Rawalpindi Rams against Lahore Lions in January 2005, and made his Twenty20 debut for Rawalpindi Rams against Faisalabad Wolves in the 2005–06 ABN-AMRO Twenty-20 Cup on 2 March 2006.

During his domestic career, Akbar represented Rawalpindi, Rawalpindi Rams and Pakistan Television, Rawalpindi Under-19s, Pakistan Cricket Board XI, Defence Housing Authority, Pakistan Cricket Academy, Pakistan Customs, Service Industries and Fauji Fertilizer Company Limited.

Akbar established himself as a successful seam bowler in domestic cricket. In October 2007, he led Rawalpindi's win over Karachi Blues in the Quaid-e-Azam Trophy. In February 2009, he took a five-wicket haul as Rawalpindi defeated Peshawar by six wickets to keep their Quaid-e-Azam Trophy hopes alive. Later that year, he was again prominent when Rawalpindi beat Multan, taking the match figures into double digits during the low-scoring game.

In December 2013, playing for Pakistan Television in the President's Trophy Grade-I, Akbar took 10 wickets for 89 runs in the match against the State Bank of Pakistan, his best match figures in first-class cricket. Earlier that year, he had also taken an 11-wicket match haul for Omar Associates against Pakistan Education Board in the Patron's Trophy Grade-II.

Akbar continued to play senior domestic cricket until the 2018/19 season.
