= Qayyum =

Qayyum may refer to:

- Al-Qayyūm, one of the names of God in Islam
- Qayyum (Sufism), a special spiritual position of a saint
- Qayyūm al-asmā, text by the Báb

== People ==
Given name

- Qayyum Changezi (1935–2005), Pakistani footballer
- Qayyum Chowdhury (1932–2014), Bangladeshi painter
- Qayyum Jamal, Canadian alleged terrorist
- Qayyum Marjoni (born 1994), Malaysian footballer
- Qayyum Nazar (1914–1989), Pakistani Urdu language poet

Middle name

- Wasiq Qayyum Abbasi (born 1987), Pakistani politician, member of the Provincial Assembly of the Punjab

Surname

- Amir Qayyum (born 1981), Pakistani serial killer
- Azhar Qayyum (born 1977), Pakistani politician, member of the National Assembly of Pakistan
- Bushra Qayyum (born 1995), Pakistani badminton player
- Hasnain Qayyum (born 1975), Pakistani cricketer
- Imran Qayyum (born 1993), English cricketer
- Kazi Zahirul Qayyum, Bangladesh politician and Member of Parliament
- Khlid Qayyum (born 1958), Indian cricketer
- Malik Mohammad Qayyum (1944–2022), former Attorney General of Pakistan
- Sahibzada Abdul Qayyum (1863–1937), Indian (British India) educationist and politician
- Tazeen Qayyum (born 1973), Pakistani-Canadian artist
- Tengku Qayyum (born 1986), Malaysian footballer
- Zainab Qayyum (born 1975), Pakistani model

== See also ==
- Abdul Qayyum, a masculine given name
- Qayyum Stadium also known as Peshawar Sport Complex, multi-sports stadium in Peshawar, Pakistan
