= Nasim Khan =

Nasim Khan may refer to:

- Nasim Khan (cricketer), Pakistani cricketer
- Nasim Khan, an alternative name for Nasim Baras (born 1993), Afghan cricketer
- Nasim Wali Khan, politician in Pakistan
