= Wasim Khan (cricketer, born 1978) =

Pakistani cricketer (born 1978)

Personal information
- Full name: Wasim Khan
- Born: 3 February 1978 (age 48); Lahore, Punjab, Pakistan
- Batting: Right-handed
- Bowling: Right-arm fast-medium
- Role: Bowler

Domestic team information
- Years: Team
- 2000/01–2002/03: Lahore Whites
- 2001/02–2003/04: Sui Northern Gas Pipelines Limited
- 2002/03–2004/05: Lahore Blues
- 2003/04: Lahore
- 2004/05–2006/07: Lahore Lions
- 2004/05–2011/12: National Bank of Pakistan
- 2005/06–2006/07: Lahore Ravi
- FC debut: 9 October 2001 National Bank of Pakistan v Public Works Department
- Last FC: 30 October 2011 National Bank of Pakistan v Sialkot
- LA debut: 13 April 2001 National Bank of Pakistan v Khan Research Laboratories
- Last LA: 10 March 2012 National Bank of Pakistan v State Bank of Pakistan

Career statistics
Competition	First-class	List A	Twenty20
Matches	82	59	12
Runs scored	1320	185	19
Batting average	13.75	8.04	6.33
100s/50s	0/3	0/0	0/0
Top score	62	30	16*
Balls bowled	15046	2847	240
Wickets	339	67	9
Bowling average	24.31	37.14	38.44
5 wickets in innings	23	0	0
10 wickets in match	5	0	0
Best bowling	7/70	4/39	2/15
Catches/stumpings	24/–	16/–	5/–
- Source: ESPNCricinfo, 5 July 2026

Wasim Khan (born 3 February 1978) is a Pakistani former cricketer. Khan is a right-handed batsman who bowls right-arm fast-medium. He was born in Lahore, Punjab.

Khan made his List A debut for National Bank of Pakistan against Khan Research Laboratories in the One Day Tournament (Departments) on 13 April 2001. He made his first-class debut for National Bank of Pakistan against Public Works Department in the 2001–02 Patron's Trophy on 9 October 2001. He made his Twenty20 debut for Lahore Lions against Karachi Dolphins in the ABN-AMRO Twenty-20 Cup on 25 April 2005.

During his domestic career, Khan represented Lahore Whites, Sui Northern Gas Pipelines Limited, Lahore Blues, Lahore, Lahore Lions, National Bank of Pakistan and Lahore Ravi. He also appeared for teams including Pakistan A, Lahore Greens, Pakistan Cricket Board Patron's XI and Service Industries.

Khan established himself as a successful seam bowler in domestic cricket. In February 2002, playing for Lahore Whites, he took 6 wickets for 60 runs against Rest of NWFP in the Quaid-e-Azam Trophy. Later that year, he helped Lahore Whites to an innings victory over Gujranwala in the Quaid-e-Azam Trophy.

In December 2005, playing for National Bank of Pakistan in the Patron's Trophy, Khan took match figures of 12 wickets for 111 runs against Service Industries. He later remained an important bowler for National Bank of Pakistan, and in the 2010–11 Quaid-e-Azam Trophy he shared the wickets with Mohammad Talha in a win over Multan.

Khan played 82 first-class and 59 List A matches between 2001 and 2012, taking 339 first-class wickets. He continued to play senior domestic cricket until the 2011–12 season.
