= Sanaullah Khan =

Sanaullah Khan can refer to:

- Sanaullah Khan (Balochistan cricketer)
- Rana Sanaullah
- Sanaullah Khan Zehri
- Sanaullah Khan Mastikhel
- Sanaullah Khan Niazi
