= Shujauddin =

Shujauddin or Shuja-ud-Din may refer to:

- Feer Khan Shujauddin (died 1657), Ismāʿīli leader, 33rd Da'i al Mutlaq of the Dawoodi Bohra sect.
- Malik ul Ashtar Shujauddin (born 1948), son of 52nd Da'i al-Mutlaq, Mohammed Burhanuddin.
- Shujauddin (cricketer, 1919–2003), Indian cricketer for Delhi and Pakistani Test cricket umpire
- Shujauddin (cricketer, 1930–2006), Pakistani Test cricketer
- Shujauddin (cricketer, born 1936), Pakistani cricketer for Punjab A and Water and Power Development Authority
- Shujauddin (cricketer, born 1970), Pakistani cricketer for Quetta
- Shuja-ud-Din Muhammad Khan (1670–1740), Nawab of Bengal, Bihar, and Orissa
- Shujauddin Malik (born 1972), Pakistani weightlifter
- Shujauddin Shaikh (born 1974), Emir of Tanzeem-e-Islami
