= Raheel Majeed =

Pakistani cricketer (born 1983)

Personal information
- Full name: Raheel Majeed
- Born: 9 September 1983 (age 43); Islamabad, Pakistan
- Batting: Right-handed
- Bowling: Leg break
- Role: Batter

Domestic team information
- Years: Team
- 2000/01–2016/17: Islamabad
- 2002/03: Zarai Taraqiati Bank Limited
- 2004/05: Rawalpindi Rams
- 2005/06–2012/13: Islamabad Leopards
- 2007/08–2010/11: Federal Areas
- 2008/09–2009/10: Federal Areas Leopards
- 2010/11–2017/18: Pakistan Television
- 2014/15: AJK Jaguars
- Last FC: 2 November 2017 Pakistan Television v Khan Research Laboratories
- LA debut: 28 April 2001 Islamabad v Rawalpindi
- Last LA: 1 February 2015 Pakistan Television v Sui Southern Gas Corporation

Career statistics
Competition	First-class	List A	Twenty20
Matches	103	69	35
Runs scored	5270	1980	704
Batting average	28.64	29.55	21.33
100s/50s	8/25	2/13	0/4
Top score	174	129	72*
Balls bowled	4162	1799	77
Wickets	66	48	7
Bowling average	43.28	35.68	19.85
5 wickets in innings	1	0	0
10 wickets in match	0	0	0
Best bowling	5/66	4/47	3/21
Catches/stumpings	97/–	25/–	6/–
- Source: ESPNCricinfo, 5 July 2026

Raheel Majeed (born 9 September 1983) is a Pakistani former cricketer. Majeed is a right-handed batsman who bowls leg breaks. He was born in Islamabad.

Majeed represented Pakistan Under-19s, and was later named in the Pakistan Cricket Academy squad for tours of Zimbabwe and Hong Kong Sixes in 2008.

Majeed made his debut for Islamabad in a List A match in the 2000/01 Pakistani season against Rawalpindi. The following season, he made his first-class debut for the team. He made his Twenty20 debut for Rawalpindi Rams against Quetta Bears in the ABN-AMRO Twenty-20 Cup on 25 April 2005.

During his domestic career, Majeed represented Islamabad, Zarai Taraqiati Bank Limited, Rawalpindi Rams, Islamabad Leopards, Federal Areas, Federal Areas Leopards, Pakistan Television and AJK Jaguars. He also represented Pakistan Cricket Academy and other Islamabad regional sides.

Majeed established himself as a successful opening batter in domestic cricket. In December 2007, playing for Islamabad in the Quaid-e-Azam Trophy, he scored 107 against Khan Research Laboratories, his first first-class century, and also took three wickets in the first innings.

In November 2010, playing for Pakistan Television, Majeed made a career-best 162 against Khan Research Laboratories in the 2010–11 Quaid-e-Azam Trophy. In January 2013, he scored an unbeaten 124 and shared a 207-run opening stand with Shan Masood as Islamabad beat Quetta by nine wickets in the Quaid-e-Azam Trophy. The following year, playing for Pakistan Television in the President's Cup Silver League, he scored a century in a seven-wicket win over Multan Tigers.

Majeed played 103 first-class, 69 List A and 35 Twenty20 matches between the 2000/01 and 2017/18 seasons, scoring 5,270 runs in first-class cricket, including eight centuries.
