= Aamer Iqbal =

Pakistani cricketer (born 1973)

Personal information
- Full name: Iqbal Ahmed Aamer
- Born: 2 June 1973 (age 53); Karachi, Sindh, Pakistan
- Batting: Right-handed
- Bowling: Right-arm off-break
- Role: Wicket-keeper

Domestic team information
- Years: Team
- 1991/92: Karachi Whites
- 1993/94–2004/05: Karachi Blues
- 1996/97–2006/07: Pakistan Customs
- 1998/99: Hyderabad
- 2003/04–2004/05: Defence Housing Authority

Career statistics
Competition	First-class	List A
Matches	71	57
Runs scored	2,869	942
Batting average	29.27	23.55
100s/50s	2/18	0/4
Top score	129	72
Balls bowled	84	24
Wickets	1	0
Bowling average	58.00	–
5 wickets in innings	0	0
10 wickets in match	0	–
Best bowling	1/32	–
Catches/stumpings	155/10	59/26
- Source: Cricinfo, 20 April 2026

Iqbal Ahmed Aamer (born 2 June 1973), commonly known as Aamer Iqbal, is a Pakistani former cricketer. Iqbal was a right-handed batsman and wicket-keeper. He was born in Karachi, Sindh, Pakistan.

Iqbal represented Pakistan Under-19s in Youth Tests and Youth One-Day Internationals in 1993/94 before going on to play domestic cricket for Karachi Whites, Karachi Blues, Pakistan Customs, Hyderabad and Defence Housing Authority. His senior career spanned from 1991/92 to 2006/07 in first-class cricket and from 1991/92 to 2005/06 in List A cricket.

Iqbal scored 2,869 runs in 71 first-class matches at an average of 29.27, with two centuries and 18 half-centuries. As a wicket-keeper, he also took 155 catches and completed 10 stumpings in first-class cricket. He scored 942 runs in 57 List A matches at an average of 23.55, with four half-centuries and a highest score of 72, while taking 59 catches and 26 stumpings.

His first first-class century came for Pakistan Customs against Allied Bank Limited in the 2000–01 PCB Patron's Trophy, when he made 129 in Pakistan Customs' only innings. His runs came from 160 balls and included 17 fours, helping his side to 425 and an innings victory.

Iqbal's second and final first-class century came for Defence Housing Authority against Bangladesh A in the 2003–04 Patrons Trophy. After Defence Housing Authority had been forced to follow on, he made 129 in the second innings and helped secure a draw.
