= Zeeshan Khan =

Zeeshan Khan may refer to:

- Zeeshan Khan (Multan cricketer) (born 1976), Pakistani cricketer
- Zeeshan Khan (Khyber Pakhtunkhwa cricketer) (born 1992), Pakistani cricketer
- Zeeshan Khan (squash player) (born 1997), Pakistani squash player
