= Mohammad Aslam (Peshawar cricketer) =

Pakistani cricketer (born 1979)

Personal information
- Full name: Mohammad Aslam Qureshi
- Born: 4 November 1979 (age 47); Peshawar, North-West Frontier Province, Pakistan
- Batting: Right-handed
- Bowling: Slow left-arm orthodox
- Role: Bowler

Domestic team information
- Years: Team
- 1996/97–2006/07: Peshawar
- 2000/01–2006/07: Water and Power Development Authority
- 2004/05–2012/13: Peshawar Panthers
- 2007/08–2014/15: Habib Bank Limited
- 2007/08–2008/09: North-West Frontier Province
- Last FC: 3 December 2014 Habib Bank Limited v State Bank of Pakistan
- Last LA: 1 February 2015 Habib Bank Limited v Water and Power Development Authority

Career statistics
Competition	First-class	List A	Twenty20
Matches	83	78	32
Runs scored	1063	229	28
Batting average	12.50	12.05	4.00
100s/50s	0/1	0/0	0/0
Top score	74*	38	7*
Balls bowled	15134	3699	703
Wickets	276	98	35
Bowling average	23.44	26.53	22.40
5 wickets in innings	18	0	0
10 wickets in match	4	0	0
Best bowling	7/37	4/34	4/13
Catches/stumpings	29/–	21/–	5/–
- Source: ESPNCricinfo, 5 July 2026

Mohammad Aslam Qureshi (born 4 November 1979) is a Pakistani former cricketer. Aslam was a right-handed batsman who bowled slow left-arm orthodox. He was born in Peshawar, North-West Frontier Province.

Aslam made his List A debut for Peshawar in the 1996/97 Pakistani season. He made his first-class debut for Peshawar in the 1998/99 season, and made his Twenty20 debut for Peshawar Panthers against Hyderabad Hawks in the ABN-AMRO Twenty-20 Cup on 25 April 2005.

During his domestic career, Aslam represented Peshawar, Water and Power Development Authority, Peshawar Panthers, Habib Bank Limited and North-West Frontier Province.

Aslam established himself as a successful left-arm spinner in domestic cricket. In October 2007, playing for Habib Bank Limited, he helped bowl his side to an innings victory over Hyderabad in the Quaid-e-Azam Trophy. In January 2010, he took career-best innings figures of 7 wickets for 37 runs for Habib Bank Limited against Karachi Blues in the Pentangular Cup.

Later that year, Aslam took 5 wickets for 30 runs against Karachi Blues in the 2010–11 Quaid-e-Azam Trophy, helping Habib Bank Limited gain the advantage in Karachi. In December 2013, he took five wickets for Habib Bank Limited against WAPDA in the 2013–14 President's Trophy.

Aslam played 83 first-class, 78 List A and 32 Twenty20 matches between the 1996/97 and 2014/15 seasons, taking 276 wickets in first-class cricket.
