= Attock Group cricket team =

Cricket team

Attock Group were a first-class cricket team sponsored by the Attock Group of Companies in Rawalpindi, Pakistan. They played in the 2006–07 season, competing in the Patron's Trophy.

== Playing record ==
After winning the Patron's Trophy Grade-II competition in 2005-06 under the name of Attock Refinery Limited, Attock Group were promoted to the first-class division for 2006–07. Most of their players came from the Rawalpindi area, including the captain, Babar Naeem.

Attock Group played four matches, losing two and drawing two, and finished at the bottom of their group. They have not played first-class cricket since.

The highest score was 152 not out by Imran Ali. The best bowling figures were 6 for 92 by Asim Butt.

== See also ==
- List of Attock Group cricketers
