= Yasir Arafat (cricketer, born 1984) =

Pakistani cricketer (born 1984)

Personal information
- Born: 28 December 1984 (age 41); Multan, Punjab, Pakistan
- Source: Cricinfo, 27 March 2021

Yasir Arafat (born 28 December 1984) is a Pakistani former cricketer. He played in 47 first-class and 36 List A matches between 2002 and 2013. He made his Twenty20 debut on 25 April 2005, for Multan Tigers in the 2004–05 National Twenty20 Cup.
