= Mohammad Aslam (Balochistan cricketer) =

Pakistani cricketer (born 1987)

Personal information
- Born: 1 January 1987 (age 39); Kalat, Pakistan
- Source: Cricinfo, 28 March 2021

Mohammad Aslam (born 1 January 1987) is a Pakistani cricketer. He played in fourteen first-class and twelve List A matches between 2005 and 2009. He made his Twenty20 debut on 25 April 2005, for Quetta Bears in the 2004–05 National Twenty20 Cup.
