= Waqas Ahmed (cricketer, born 1979) =

Pakistani cricketer (born 1979)

Personal information
- Full name: Waqas Ahmed
- Born: 24 January 1979 (age 47); Lahore, Punjab, Pakistan
- Batting: Right-handed
- Bowling: Right-arm fast-medium

Domestic team information
- Years: Team
- 1996/97–1998/99: Lahore City
- 1999/00: REDCO Pakistan Limited
- 2000/01–2001/02: Lahore Blues
- 2000/01–2003/04: Water and Power Development Authority
- 2004/05: Lahore Whites
- 2004/05–2005/06: Sui Northern Gas Pipelines Limited
- 2005/06: Lahore Shalimar
- 2006/07–2009/10: Lahore Ravi
- 2007/08: Punjab
- 2004/05–2007/08: Lahore Eagles
- 2006/07–2011/12: Lahore Lions

Career statistics
Competition	First-class	List A	Twenty20
Matches	87	73	25
Runs scored	1,943	721	186
Batting average	16.19	14.42	12.40
100s/50s	1/5	0/3	0/0
Top score	114	67*	46
Balls bowled	13,870	3,106	281
Wickets	315	87	14
Bowling average	23.96	30.59	34.64
5 wickets in innings	16	2	0
10 wickets in match	5	0	0
Best bowling	7/45	5/54	4/22
Catches/stumpings	34/–	17/–	7/–
- Source: Cricinfo, 29 April 2026

Waqas Ahmed (born 24 January 1979) is a Pakistani former cricketer. Ahmed was a right-handed batsman who bowled right-arm fast-medium. He was born in Lahore, Punjab.

Ahmed made his first-class debut for Lahore City against Islamabad in the semi-final of the 1996–97 Quaid-e-Azam Trophy on 16 November 1996. He made his List A debut for Lahore City against Gujranwala in the 1997–98 Wills Cup on 15 March 1998. He later represented Lahore City, REDCO Pakistan Limited, Lahore Blues, Water and Power Development Authority, Lahore Whites, Sui Northern Gas Pipelines Limited, Lahore Shalimar, Lahore Ravi and Punjab in first-class cricket, while also appearing for Lahore, Lahore Eagles and Lahore Lions in one-day and Twenty20 cricket.

Ahmed made his Twenty20 debut for Lahore Eagles against Sialkot Stallions in the 2004–05 ABN-AMRO Twenty-20 Cup on 26 April 2005.

Ahmed also represented Pakistan Under-19s, making appearances in Youth Tests and Youth One Day Internationals in 1996/97 and 1997/98, and he played for Pakistan in the 1998 Under-19 Cricket World Cup.
