= Mohammad Ali Niazi =

Pakistani cricketer (born 1982)

Personal information
- Full name: Mohammad Ali Niazi
- Born: 22 December 1982 (age 43); Multan, Punjab, Pakistan
- Batting: Right-handed
- Bowling: Slow left-arm orthodox
- Role: Batsman

Domestic team information
- Years: Team
- Multan
- Pakistan Customs
- Multan Tigers

Career statistics
Competition	First-class	List A	Twenty20
Matches	29	31	8
Runs scored	1,090	854	34
Batting average	21.37	34.16	4.85
100s/50s	1/7	1/3	0/0
Top score	104	207	13
Balls bowled	756	262	36
Wickets	8	6	1
Bowling average	52.50	34.83	52.00
5 wickets in innings	0	0	0
10 wickets in match	0	0	0
Best bowling	2/5	2/21	1/25
Catches/stumpings	15/–	13/–	2/–
- Source: Cricinfo, 3 May 2026

Mohammad Ali Niazi (born 22 December 1982) is a Pakistani former cricketer. Niazi was a right-handed batsman who bowled slow left-arm orthodox. He was born in Multan, Punjab, and played domestic cricket in Pakistan for Multan, Pakistan Customs and Multan Tigers.

Niazi made his first-class debut for Multan in the 2001–02 Quaid-e-Azam Trophy, and later played List A and Twenty20 cricket for Pakistan Customs and Multan Tigers.

His best-known innings came in April 2005, when he opened for Pakistan Customs against DHA in a Patron's Cup List A match at Jinnah Stadium, Sialkot. Niazi scored 207 from 146 balls, with 24 fours and six sixes, as Customs made 395 for 5. It was the first double-century in Pakistan domestic limited-overs cricket.

Late in his career, Niazi made his only first-class century for Multan Tigers against United Bank Limited in the 2014–15 Quaid-e-Azam Trophy Gold League. Batting in the first innings at Multan Cricket Stadium, he scored 104, while Abdul Rehman Muzammil made 111 in the same innings.

Overall, Niazi played in 29 first-class matches, scoring 1,090 runs at a batting average of 21.37, with one century and seven half-centuries. In 31 List A matches, he scored 854 runs at an average of 34.16, with one century and three fifties. As an occasional spinner, he took eight first-class wickets, six List A wickets and one Twenty20 wicket.
