= Fahad Khan =

Pakistani cricketer (born 1983)

Personal information
- Born: 25 November 1983 (age 42)
- Source: Cricinfo, 27 March 2021

Fahad Khan (born 25 November 1983) is a Pakistani cricketer. He played in 32 first-class and 15 List A matches between 2003 and 2009.

Khan made his first-class debut for the Karachi Port Trust against the Zarai Traqiata Bank Limited at Peshawar on 15 December 2003. Khan made his Twenty20 debut on 25 April 2005, for Karachi Dolphins in the 2004–05 National Twenty20 Cup.
