= Hanif Malik =

Pakistani cricketer (born 1981)

Personal information
- Full name: Hanif Malik
- Born: February 19, 1981 (age 45); Hyderabad, Sindh, Pakistan
- Batting: Right-handed
- Bowling: Leg break
- Role: Wicket-keeper

Domestic team information
- Years: Team
- 2001/02–2010: Hyderabad
- 2005–2008: Hyderabad Hawks
- 2010: Sui Northern

Career statistics
Competition	FC	LA	T20
Matches	77	39	11
Runs scored	2059	369	80
Batting average	16.34	14.19	11.42
100s/50s	0/8	0/0	0/0
Top score	90	40	22
Balls bowled	205	0	–
Wickets	3	0	–
Bowling average	46.66	–	–
5 wickets in innings	0	0	–
10 wickets in match	0	0	–
Best bowling	2/28	–	–
Catches/stumpings	207/14	28/15	7/3
- Source: Cricinfo, 26 February 2026

Hanif Malik (born 19 February 1981) is a Pakistani cricket coach and former cricketer. He played in 77 first-class and 39 List A matches between 2001 and 2010 as a wicketkeeper.

== Career ==
Malik made his first class debut in the 2001/02 season. He made his Twenty20 debut on 25 April 2005, for Hyderabad Hawks in the 2004–05 National Twenty20 Cup.

During the 2006/07 Quaid i Azam Trophy Silver League, he made his career best 90 for Hyderabad against Quetta at the Niaz Stadium in Hyderabad after the side had slumped to 74 for six.

In 2007, Malik was named by the Hyderabad District Cricket Association in a 20 member squad for the PCB Inter District Senior Cricket Championship.

In June 2023, Malik was named as the batting and fielding coach of the Pakistan Shaheens for the ACC Men's Emerging Asia Cup. In 2024, he served as fielding coach of Pakistan women's cricket team management during the ACC Women's T20 Asia Cup.

In 2025, Malik was named as the batting coach of Pakistan national cricket team.
