= Nasim Khan (cricketer) =

Pakistani cricketer

Personal information
- Full name: Mohammad Nasim Khan
- Born: 1 June 1976 (age 50); Quetta, Pakistan
- Batting: Left-handed
- Bowling: Slow left-arm orthodox

Domestic team information
- Years: Team
- 1998/99–2003/04: Quetta
- 1999/00–2004/05: Pakistan Customs
- 2002: Cambridgeshire
- 2004/05–2011/12: Quetta Bears
- 2007/08–2008/09: Baluchistan

Career statistics
Competition	FC	LA	T20
Matches	89	61	11
Runs scored	4,440	2,164	154
Batting average	30.83	37.31	14.00
100s/50s	9/24	4/13	0/0
Top score	151	123	32
Balls bowled	342	158	–
Wickets	3	2	–
Bowling average	64.00	71.00	–
5 wickets in innings	0	0	–
10 wickets in match	0	0	–
Best bowling	2/17	1/4	–
Catches/stumpings	34/–	12/–	0/–
- Source: Cricinfo, 8 April 2025

Mohammad Nasim Khan (born 1 June 1976) is a Pakistani former cricketer. Khan was a left-handed batsman who bowled slow left-arm orthodox. He was born at Quetta, Balochistan Province. He is also known as Mohammad Naseem.

Having made his List A debut for Quetta in the 1998/99 Tissot Cup against Hyderabad, a tournament in which he made five appearances for the team, Khan made his first-class debut for Pakistan Customs against Lahore City in the 1999/00 Quaid-e-Azam Trophy. In that same season he also made his List A debut for Pakistan Customs against Karachi Whites in the 1999/00 Tissot Cup. Khan made a total of 30 first-class appearances for the team between the 1999/00 and 2004/05 seasons, scoring a total of 1,430 runs at an average of 36.66, with a highest score of 127. This score, which was one of two first-class centuries he made for the team, came against the Water and Power Development Authority in 1999. Over the same period, he represented Pakistan Customs in 26 List A matches, scoring a total of 1,148 runs at an average of 44.15, with a highest score of 123.

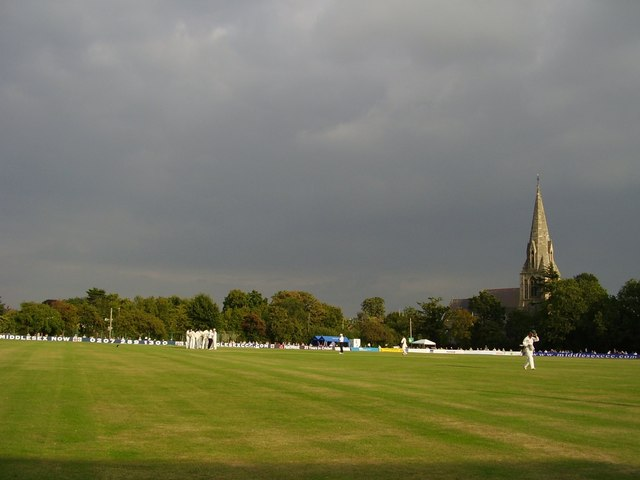
Khan's only appearance for Cambridgeshire came at John Walker's Ground, Southgate in 2002

This score was one of three centuries he made in that format for Pakistan Customs and came against the Water and Power Development Authority in the 2001/02 Departments One-Day Tournament. During his period playing for Pakistan Customs, Khan also played county cricket in England for Cambridgeshire, making a single List A appearance for the Minor county in the 2nd round of the 2003 Cheltenham & Gloucester Trophy against the Middlesex Cricket Board, which was held in 2002 to avoid fixture congestion the following season. He didn't appear in Minor counties cricket for the county. He also continued to make List A appearances for Quetta during this period, making a total of eleven appearances up to the 2003/04 season. He scored a total of 377 runs at an average of 41.88, with a highest score of 101 not out.

He also made his first-class debut for Quetta during this period, against Multan in the 2003/04 Quaid-e-Azam Trophy. To date he has made 46 first-class appearances for his home city, scoring 2,417 runs at an average of 30.21, with a high score of 151. He has also represented the Quetta Bears in limited-overs cricket, making his List A debut for the team against the Multan Tigers in the 2004/05 ABN-AMRO Cup. To date he has made 21 List A appearances for the team, scoring 562 runs at an average of 26.76, with a highest score of 62. It was for the Quetta Bears that he made his Twenty20 debut for against the Rawalpindi Rams in the 2004/05 ABN-AMRO Twenty-20 Cup. He made eleven Twenty20 appearances for the team between the 2004/05 and 2007/08 seasons, with his final appearance in that format coming against the Rawalpindi Rams in the 2007/08 RBS Twenty-20 Cup. In his eleven appearances, he scored a total of 154 runs at an average of 14.00, with a high score of 32. In the 2007/08 season, he made his debut for Baluchistan in a first-class match against Federal Areas in the 2007/08 Pentangular Cup. He played for Baluchistan in the 2007/08 and 2008/09 competitions, making five appearances and scoring a total of 122 runs at an average of 12.20, with a high score of 38. Khan has also appeared eight times in first-class cricket for the Rest of Baluchistan, scoring a total of 471 runs at an average of 31.40, with a highest score of 104.
