= Sajid Mahmood (Pakistani cricketer) =

Pakistani cricketer (born 1981)

Personal information
- Born: 10 January 1981 (age 45); Islamabad, Pakistan
- Source: Cricinfo, 28 March 2021

Sajid Mahmood (born 10 January 1981) is a Pakistani cricketer. He played in 28 first-class and 12 List A matches between 2001 and 2009. He made his Twenty20 debut on 25 April 2005, playing for Rawalpindi Rams in the 2004–05 National Twenty20 Cup.
