= Nadeem Javed (cricketer) =

Pakistani cricketer (born 1984)

Personal information
- Born: 12 September 1984 (age 42); Farooqabad, Punjab, Pakistan
- Source: Cricinfo, 28 March 2021

Nadeem Javed (born 12 September 1984) is a Pakistani cricketer. He played in 17 first-class and 21 List A matches between 2001 and 2009. He made his Twenty20 debut on 28 April 2005, for Sialkot Stallions in the 2004–05 National Twenty20 Cup.
