= Shujauddin (cricketer, born 1970) =

Pakistani cricketer

Personal information
- Full name: Shujauddin
- Born: 16 February 1970 (age 56); Quetta, Balochistan, Pakistan
- Batting: Right-handed
- Role: Wicket-keeper

Domestic team information
- Years: Team
- 1999: Quetta

Career statistics
Competition	LA
Matches	4
Runs scored	45
Batting average	15.00
100s/50s	0/0
Top score	22*
Catches/stumpings	5/2
- Source: CricketArchive, 2 March 2013

Shujauddin (born 16 February 1970) is a former Pakistani cricketer. From Quetta, the capital of Balochistan province, all of his matches at a major level came during the 1998–99 season of the limited-overs Tissot Cup. Shujauddin made his debut for Quetta against Hyderabad in April 1999, scoring 22 not out on debut, in what was to be his highest score in List A matches. A wicket-keeper, he played three further matches during the competition, but was replaced by Sanaullah Khan for the final fixture against the Pakistan National Shipping Corporation. Overall, Shujauddin scored 45 runs and made seven dismissals (five catches and two stumpings) from his four matches in the competition.
