= Hasnain Abbas =

Pakistani cricketer (born 1984)

Personal information
- Born: 1 January 1984 (age 42); Mian Channu, Pakistan
- Source: ESPNcricinfo, 27 March 2021

Hasnain Abbas (born 1 January 1984) is a Pakistani cricketer. He played in 19 first-class and 11 List A matches between 2001 and 2008. He made his Twenty20 debut on 25 April 2005, for Multan Tigers in the 2004–05 National Twenty20 Cup.
