= Sajid Ali (Lahore cricketer) =

Pakistani cricketer (born 1979)

Personal information
- Born: 23 January 1979 (age 47); Lahore, Pakistan
- Source: Cricinfo, 27 March 2021

Sajid Ali (born 23 January 1979) is a Pakistani cricketer. He played in 34 first-class and 18 List A matches between 1997 and 2006. He made his Twenty20 debut on 25 April 2005, for Lahore Lions in the 2004–05 National Twenty20 Cup.
