= Muntazir Mehdi =

Pakistani cricketer (born 1981)

Personal information
- Born: 15 December 1981 (age 44)
- Source: Cricinfo, 27 March 2021

Muntazir Mehdi (born 15 December 1981) is a Pakistani cricketer. He played in 14 first-class and 20 List A matches between 2001 and 2014. He made his Twenty20 debut on 26 April 2005, for Lahore Lions in the 2004–05 National Twenty20 Cup.
