= Sohail Ahmed (cricketer) =

Pakistani cricketer (born 1985)

Personal information
- Born: 5 November 1985 (age 41); Lahore, Pakistan
- Source: Cricinfo, 25 October 2015

Sohail Ahmed (born 5 November 1985) is a Pakistani first-class cricketer who played for Lahore. He started his first class career in 2004 and played his last match in 2013.
