= Babar Naeem =

Pakistani cricketer (born 1983)

Personal information
- Born: 1 January 1983 (age 43); Rawalpindi, Pakistan
- Batting: Left-handed
- Bowling: Slow left-arm orthodox

Career statistics
| Competition | FC | List A |
|---|---|---|
| Matches | 162 | 105 |
| Runs scored | 8120 | 3185 |
| Batting average | 29.20 | 30.04 |
| 100s/50s | 12/41 | 1/24 |
| Top score | 227 | 112 |
| Balls bowled | 9311 | 4131 |
| Wickets | 144 | 84 |
| Bowling average | 32.25 | 41.50 |
| 5 wickets in innings | 2 | 0 |
| 10 wickets in match | 0 | n/a |
| Best bowling | 5/57 | 4/31 |
| Catches/stumpings | 114/- | 32/- |
- Source: Cricinfo, 10 May 2014

Babar Naeem (born 1 January 1983) is a Pakistani former cricketer who played first-class cricket for Rawalpindi from 1999–2000 to 2015–16.

His highest score was 227, which he made in the second innings against Lahore Blues in 2001–02, after scoring 62 in the first innings. He captained Attock Group in 2006–07, and captained Rawalpindi from 2010–11 to 2015–16. He led Rawalpindi to victory in the final of the Quaid-e-Azam Trophy in 2013–14.
