= Asif Hussain =

Pakistani cricketer (born 1979)

Personal information
- Born: 20 November 1979 (age 46); Faisalabad, Pakistan
- Source: Cricinfo, 25 October 2015

Asif Hussain (born 20 November 1979) is a Pakistani former first-class cricketer who played for Faisalabad and WAPDA.
