= Qayyum (Sufism) =

Spiritual position in Sufism

Qayyum (Arabic: قیوم) is a special spiritual position in Sufism, especially in the Naqshbandi tradition. The term was coined by Ahmed Sirhindi, who was the first Qayyum. According to him, a Qayyum is a dignitary upon whom the whole order of existence depends. The word is derived from al-Qayyum, a name of God in Islam that has the same meaning. According to the doctrine, only one Qayyum is alive at any particular time.

== The first four Qayyums ==
The first Qayyum was Ahmad Sirhindi (d. 1624). The second was Ahmed Sirhindi's third son, Khwaja Muhammad Masum Faruqi (d.1668), who was followed by his son Khwaja Muhammad Hujjatullah Naqshbandi (d. 1703). The fourth Qayyum was Khwaja Muhammad Zubair (d. 1740), the grandson of Khwaja Naqshbandi.

== Other claimed Qayyums ==
Several other influential Sufis have claimed the title of Qayyum.

=== Mirza Mazhar Jan-e-Janan Shaheed ===
Mirza Mazhar Jan-e-Janan (d. 1817) was an important saint of the Naqshbandi Sufi order in the 18th century. He was also a renowned poet of modern Urdu. Shah Waliullah, an Islamic scholar and contemporary of Mirza Mazhar, is quoted as saying, "As far as I can see, and I can see the seven continents, there is no saint today like Mirza Mazhar."

=== Shah Muhammad Safiullah Faruqi (d.1844) ===
Muhammad Safiullah Faruqi was the son of Ghulam Masoom Faruqi Mujaddidi. He died in the Hijri month of Dhu al-Qadah in 1844 on his return journey from the hajj. Makhdoom Safi Ullah died in Hudaydah, a coastal city of Yemen.

=== Shah Ghulam Ali Dehlavi ===
Ghulam Ali Dehlavi (d. 1662) is also claimed to be the Mujaddid, a person who revives Islam every century, for the 13th century of the Islamic calendar.

=== Shah Abu Saeed Faruqi Mujaddidi ===
Abu Saeed Faruqi Mujaddidi (d.1672) was predicted to be the next Qayyum by Ghulam Ali Dehlavi, his own Shaykh.
