= Aariz Kamal =

Pakistani cricketer (born 1983)

Aariz Kamal (born 18 January 1983 in Karachi) is a Pakistani former first-class cricketer active 2001–2015 who played for several Karachi-based teams and also represented his country at under-19 level. Aariz Kamal was a right-handed batsman and a right-arm off break bowler. He scored 119 runs with a highest score of 119, held 16 catches and took two wickets in his 17 first-class appearances.
