= Shahid Iqbal (cricketer) =

Pakistani cricketer (born 1974)

Cricket information
- Batting: Right-handed
- Bowling: Right-arm fast-medium

Career statistics
Competition	First-class	List A
Matches	25	32
Runs scored	515	380
Batting average	15.60	31.66
100s/50s	0/0	1/0
Top score	48	113*
Balls bowled	4,454	1,350
Wickets	98	36
Bowling average	21.18	29.97
5 wickets in innings	5	0
10 wickets in match	0	0
Best bowling	8/52	4/39
Catches/stumpings	4/–	10/–
- Source: Cricinfo, 5 November 2022

Shahid Iqbal (born 9 April 1974) is a Pakistani former cricketer who played first-class cricket for Karachi and Hyderabad teams between 1995 and 2004.

In 1998/99 he shared the world record List A 8th-wicket partnership in a 203-run stand with Haaris Ayaz. He also holds the record for the best first-class bowling figures for Karachi Port Trust, having taken 7 wickets for 19 runs, in 2003/04.
