= Aftab Khan (fielding coach) =

Pakistani cricketer (born 1984)

Personal information
- Full name: Aftab Alam Khan
- Born: 27 April 1984 (age 42); Peshawar, Pakistan
- Source: Cricinfo, 8 November 2015

Aftab Alam Khan (born 27 April 1984), commonly known as Aftab Khan, is a Pakistani fielding coach and former first-class cricketer who served as the fielding coach of Pakistan national cricket team from 2023 to 2024. Previously, he played for the Peshawar cricket team and Habib Bank Limited cricket team. He was named man of the match in the final of the 2010–11 Quaid-e-Azam Trophy, played for Habib Bank. Later, after retirement, he joined Habib Bank as a cricket coach.

== Career ==
Khan began his first class career from Peshawar division in 2000. After his retirement he appointed in Pakistan cricket board as an assistant coach of Khyber Pakhtunkhwa and later became head coach of Khyber Pakhtunkhwa 2nd team head coach since 2021 til 2023. Recently he also appointed as fielding and performance coach with Pakistan national team.
