= Redco Pakistan Limited cricket team =

Cricket team

Redco Pakistan Limited were a first-class cricket team sponsored by the Pakistan branch of Redco International. They played in the 1999–2000 season, competing in the Quaid-e-Azam Trophy.

== First-class playing record ==
After a narrow first-innings victory in the final of Grade II of the Patron's Trophy in 1998–99, Redco Pakistan Limited were promoted to first-class status for the 1999-2000 Quaid-e-Azam Trophy.

Captained by Hasnain Qayyum, who scored 614 runs at an average of 51.16, Redco played 10 matches, winning three, losing one and drawing six, and finishing sixth out of 12 in Pool B of the Quaid-e-Azam Trophy.

Naumanullah made the most runs for the team: 642 at 71.33 with three centuries. The highest score was 213 by Rafatullah Mohmand in an innings victory over Faisalabad. The leading bowler was Imran Tahir, who took 43 wickets at 22.20, with best innings figures of 8 for 76 against Karachi Blues, and best match figures of 10 for 79 a week later against Peshawar.

== Limited-overs record ==
Redco Pakistan Limited won their first five matches in the limited-overs competition in 1999–2000, losing only in the final. Bazid Khan made 304 runs at 60.80 with four fifties.

== See also ==
- List of Redco Pakistan Limited cricketers
