= Imran Ali (Faisalabad cricketer) =

Pakistani cricketer

Personal information
- Full name: Imran Ali
- Born: 15 April 1983 (age 43); Jaranwala, Punjab, Pakistan
- Batting: Left-handed
- Bowling: Slow left-arm orthodox
- Role: Batter

Domestic team information
- Years: Team
- 2003/04–2017/18: Faisalabad
- 2004/05–2014/15: Faisalabad Wolves
- 2010/11–2013/14: Pakistan Television
- 2011/12: Sui Northern Gas Pipelines Limited
- 2012/13: United Bank Limited

Career statistics
Competition	First-class	List A	Twenty20
Matches	83	33	11
Runs scored	4,169	944	191
Batting average	29.77	31.46	21.22
100s/50s	7/19	1/5	0/0
Top score	182*	103	44
Balls bowled	132	84
Wickets	2	1
Bowling average	41.00	80.00
5 wickets in innings	0	0
10 wickets in match	0	0
Best bowling	2/6	1/59
Catches/stumpings	60/–	9/–	3/–
- Source: Cricinfo, 29 April 2026

Imran Ali (born 15 April 1983) is a Pakistani former cricketer. Ali was a left-handed batsman who bowled slow left-arm orthodox. He was born in Jaranwala, Punjab.

Ali made his first-class debut for Faisalabad against Multan in the 2003–04 Quaid-e-Azam Trophy on 8 March 2004. On debut, he scored 52 in the first innings and took 2 wickets for 6 runs in the second innings. He made his List A debut for Faisalabad against Peshawar on 14 March 2004, and made his Twenty20 debut for Faisalabad Wolves against Karachi Dolphins in the 2004/05 ABN-AMRO Twenty-20 Cup on 29 April 2005.

During his domestic career, Ali represented Faisalabad, Faisalabad Wolves, Pakistan Television, Sui Northern Gas Pipelines Limited and United Bank Limited. He was part of the Faisalabad Wolves side that won the 2005–06 National Twenty20 Cup, scoring 41 in the final against Sialkot Stallions. In March 2006, he made 73 in the one-day final as Faisalabad Wolves defeated Lahore Eagles to win the ABN-AMRO Cup Gold League.

Ali's highest first-class score was an unbeaten 182 for Faisalabad Wolves against Sialkot Stallions in the 2014–15 Quaid-e-Azam Trophy, an innings which helped his side chase 441 for victory. His only List A century was 103, while his best limited-overs seasons came for Faisalabad Wolves in domestic one-day cricket.

Ali played 83 first-class matches. In these, he scored 4,169 runs at a batting average of 29.77, making 19 half-centuries and 7 centuries.
