= Adnan Malik (cricketer) =

Pakistani cricketer (born 1976)

Personal information
- Born: 5 October 1976 (age 50); Karachi, Pakistan
- Source: Cricinfo, 18 March 2021

Adnan Malik (born 5 October 1976) is a Pakistani cricketer. He played in 29 first-class and 31 List A matches between 1993 and 2010.
