= Naseer Khan =

Pakistani cricketer (born 1972)

Personal information
- Born: 14 October 1972 (age 54); Quetta, Pakistan
- Role: Batsman
- Source: Cricinfo, 25 October 2015

Naseer Khan (born 14 October 1972) is a Pakistani first-class cricketer who played for Quetta.
