= Maisam Hasnain =

Pakistani cricketer (born 1977)

Personal information
- Full name: Maisam Hasnain
- Born: 3 February 1977 (age 49); Karachi Pakistan
- Batting: Right-handed
- Bowling: Right-arm medium
- Relatives: Taj-ul-Hasnain (father)

Domestic team information
- Years: Team
- 1995/96–1996/97: Pakistan National Shipping Corporation
- 1996/97–2004/05: Karachi Whites
- 1998/99–2001/02: Karachi Blues
- 1998/99–2000/01: Pakistan International Airlines
- 2002: Shropshire
- 2003/04–2004/05: Karachi Port Trust
- 2005/06: Karachi Zebras
- 2006/07: Karachi Dolphins

Career statistics
Competition	FC	LA	T20
Matches	49	23	8
Runs scored	2,477	560	57
Batting average	33.02	28.00	9.50
100s/50s	7/9	2/2	0/0
Top score	160	140	21
Balls bowled	447	141	–
Wickets	6	3	–
Bowling average	47.50	56.33	–
5 wickets in innings	0	0	–
10 wickets in match	0	0	–
Best bowling	1/12	2/51	–
Catches/stumpings	43/–	4/–	4/–
- Source: Cricinfo, 22 October 2011

Maisam Hasnain (born 3 February 1977) is a former Pakistani cricketer.

== Cricket career ==
Born at Karachi to the cricketer Taj-ul-Hasnain, Hasnain toured New Zealand with the Pakistan under-19 team in March 1995, making three Youth Test and three Youth One Day International appearances against the New Zealand under-19 team. Shortly after he made his debut in Pakistani domestic first-class cricket for the Pakistan National Shipping Corporation against United Bank Limited at Rawalpindi in the 1995–96 PCB Patron's Trophy. In the following seasons edition of the competition, he played for the Karachi Whites alongside the Pakistan National Shipping Corporation.

He played first-class cricket for the Karachi Blues in the 1998/99 Quaid-e-Azam Trophy, making his debut in List A cricket during that same season for Pakistan International Airlines. He also played first-class cricket for Pakistan International Airlines in the 1999/00 and 2000/01 Quaid-e-Azam Trophy's. He played List A matches for Karachi Whites in the 2001/02 One Day National Tournament, before playing in England for Shropshire at their overseas player in their second round match in the 2003 Cheltenham & Gloucester Trophy (which was played September 2002). He made further first-class appearances for a Karachi Port Trust in 2003-04 Patron's Trophy, as well as appearing for Karachi Urban in the 2005/06 Patron's Trophy. He debuted in Twenty20 cricket for Karachi Zebras in the 2005–06 ABN-AMRO Twenty-20 Cup, before playing for Karachi Dolphins in the following seasons competition.

Across first-class cricket, Hasnain played a total of 49 matches, during which he scored 2,477 runs at an average of 33.02, making seven centuries and nine half centuries, with a highest score of 160. In List A cricket, he scored 560 runs across 23 matches at an average of 28.00, making two centuries and half centuries apiece, with a highest score of 140. In eight Twenty20 matches he scored 57 runs.
