= Shahnawaz Malik =

Pakistani cricketer (born 1984)

Personal information
- Born: 10 January 1984 (age 42); Lahore, Pakistan
- Source: Cricinfo, 25 October 2015

Shahnawaz Malik (born 10 January 1984) is a Pakistani first-class cricketer who played for Lahore.
