= Agha Sabir =

Pakistani cricketer

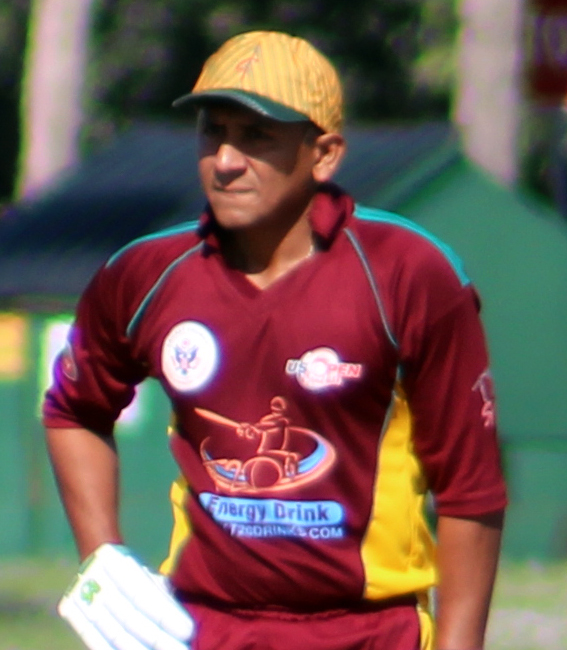
- Sabir at the 2014 Florida US Open

Personal information
- Born: 8 April 1981 (age 45); Karachi, Pakistan
- Batting: Left-handed
- Bowling: Left-arm spin
- Role: Batting all-rounder
- Source: Cricinfo, 25 October 2015

Agha Sabir (born 8 April 1981) is a Pakistani first-class cricketer who is current batting coach at Afghanistan High Performance Center. Agha Sabir started his first-class career for Pakistan Customs. In 2005, Agha Sabir was recruited by Pakistan International Airlines as a professional cricketer.

== Early career ==
Agha made his first-class debut in 2001 at the age of 20. Pakistan Customs selected him for the PCB Patron's Trophy in 2001. Agha scored his maiden first-class century against Pakistan International Airlines in his second game. He ended up scoring 196 in first innings with twenty-one fours and six sixes.

After his performance in the Patron's Trophy 2001/02, he was selected for Karachi region to participate in the Quaid-e-Azam Trophy, scoring 154.

Agha continued to make his name and represented Pakistan Academy Team against South Africa during its tour to Pakistan in 2005 and PCB XI against the touring Leicestershire County Team in 2005.

== Coaching career ==
Coaching Education

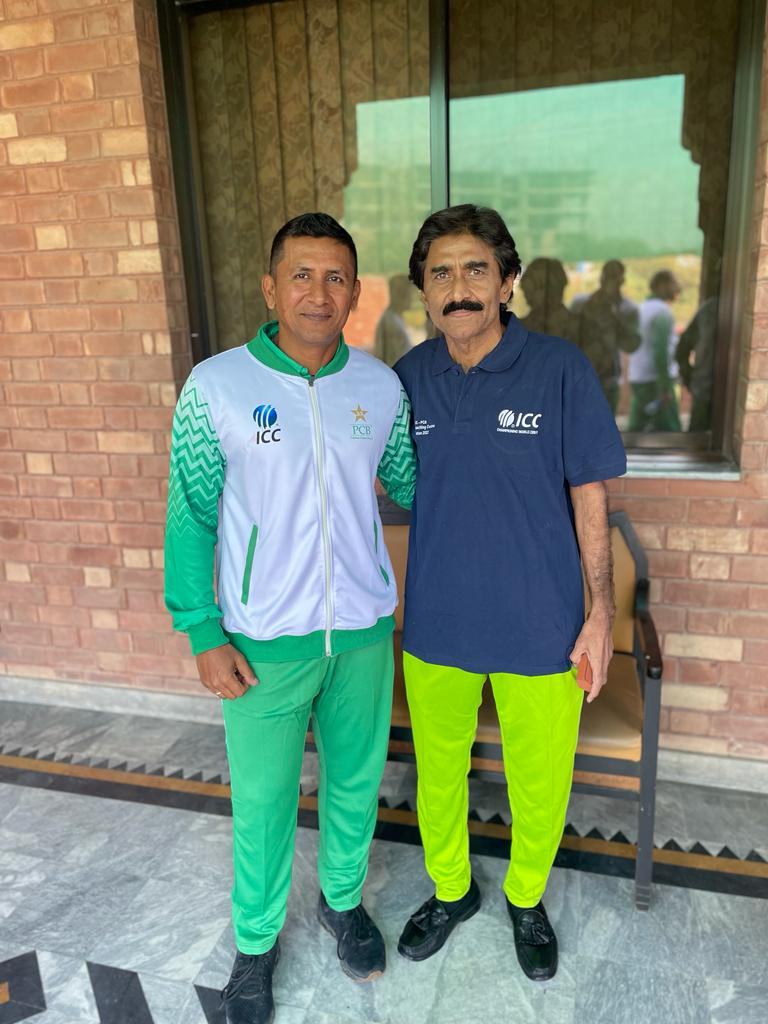
Sabir with Pakistan legend Javed Miandad during level 3 coaching course.

To progress his coaching career, Agha Sabir completed level 3 coaching course. He attended the level 3 ICC/PCB coaching course at National High Performance Center, Lahore on November 22, 2022.

Karachi On June 30, 2021, PCB appointed Agha Sabir as head coach for CCA Karachi Zone 1 side for the inter city tournament.

On August 29, 2023, joined the elite names when Pakistan Cricket Board revealed the regional coaches for the domestic cricket season 2023-24. Due to his qualification and remarkable coaching record as a coach, Agha Sabir was appointed Fielding Coach for Karachi Whites (Karachi region cricket team). Coaching panel featured 14 former Test cricketers and seven ex-international players. Karachi Whites clinched the Quaid-e-Azam trophy title 2023-24.

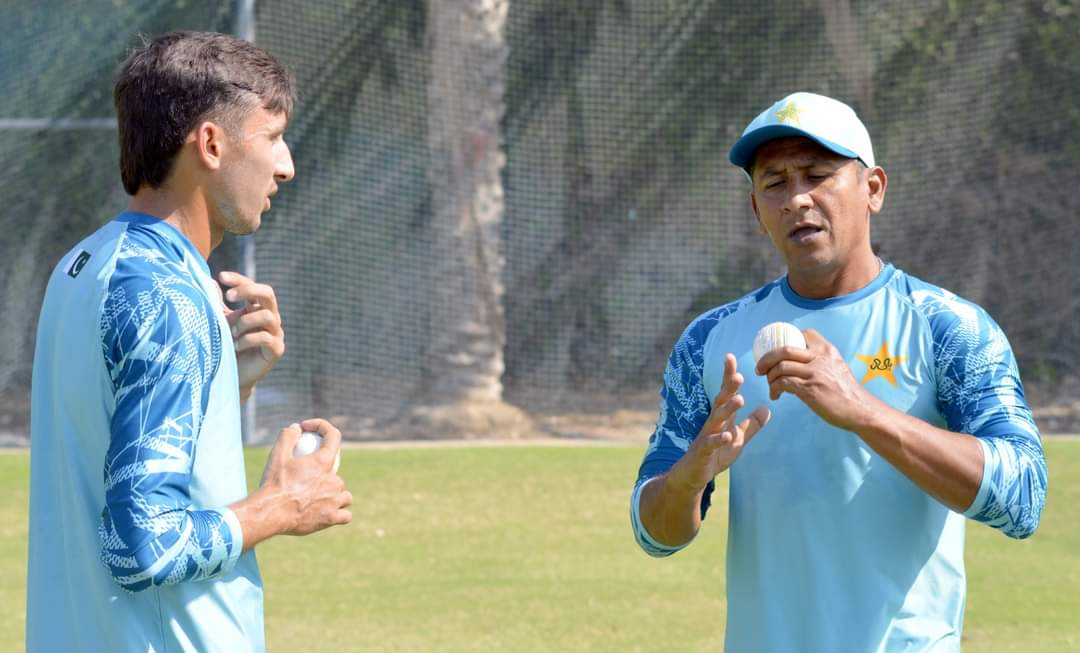
Sabir coaching a U19 player during a training session at the ACC U19 Asia Cup 2024-25

Pakistan U19

On November 28, 2024, the Pakistan Cricket Board (PCB) revealed the squad and coaching staff for the 50-over tri-series and the ACC U19 Asia Cup 2024-25, which took place in the UAE from November 13 to December 8. Agha Sabir was appointed as the assistant and fielding coach for the team.

Afghanistan

On July 17, 2025, the Afghanistan Cricket Board (PACB) appointed Agha Sabir as the batting coach at Afghanistan’s High Performance Centers. In this role, he will guide players through a range of specialized skill development programs.

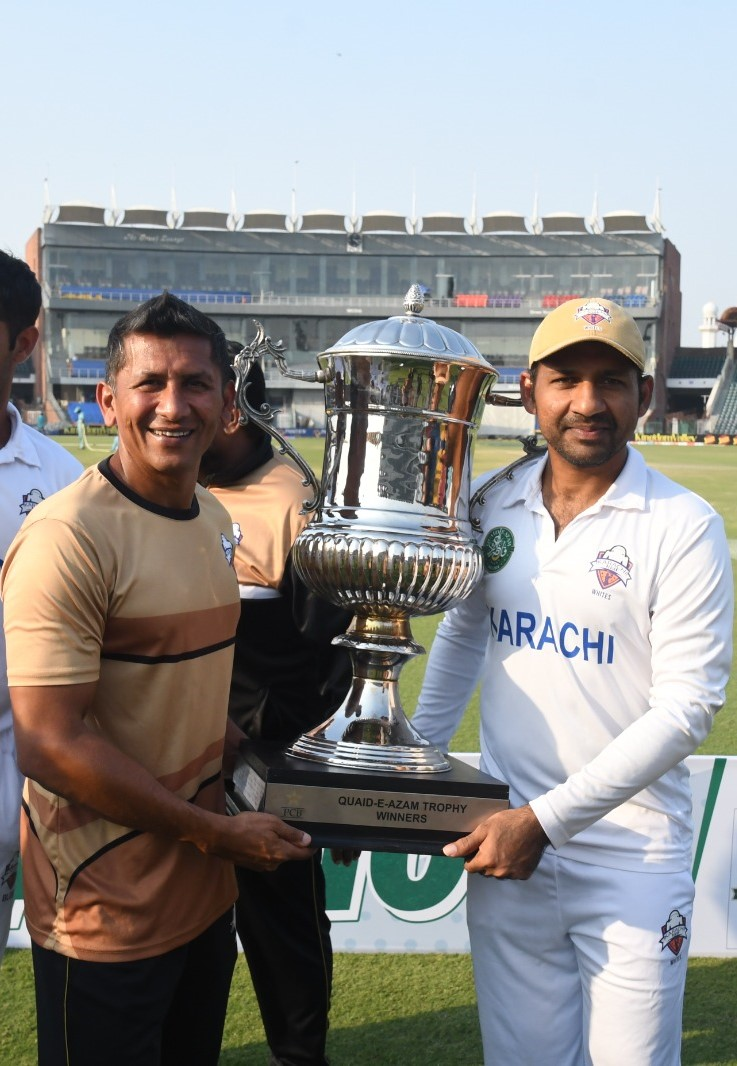
Agha Sabir proudly hoisting the Quaid-e-Azam Championship trophy alongside Pakistan Test cricket player Sarfaraz Ahmed

== Professional career ==
International Leagues
Year	Tournaments	Teams	Country
2005	North Staffs & South Cheshire Premiere Cricket League	Woore Cricket Club	England
2007	Northants Premiere League	Isham Cricket Club	England
2008	Northern Bank Senior Cup	Limavady Cricket Club	Ireland
2010	Ribblesdale Cricket League	Ribblesdale Wanderers Cricket Club	England
2011	North West Cricket Union	Bready Cricket Club	Ireland

== Professional awards ==
Awards as a Player
Tournament	Year	Achievement	Ref
National Bank of Pakistan Patron's Cup 2002/03	2003	Player of the Match	
ABN-AMRO Twenty-20 Cup 2005/06	2006	Player of the Match	
Fielding in Quaid-e-Azam Trophy Silver League 2005/06	2006	Best Fielder	
Northern Bank Senior Cup	2008	Best Bowler of the Tournament	
Faysal Bank One Day National Cup Division One 2010/11	2011	Player of the Match	
Senior Cup (Ireland)	2012	Player of the Match	
