= Jawad Hameed =

Pakistani cricketer (born 1976)

Personal information
- Born: 31 August 1976 (age 50); Rawalpindi, Pakistan
- Source: Cricinfo, 8 November 2015

Jawad Hameed (born 31 August 1976) is a Pakistani first-class cricketer who played for Rawalpindi cricket team.
