= Naumanullah =

Pakistani cricketer (born 1975)

Personal information
- Born: 20 May 1975 (age 51); Karachi, Pakistan
- Batting: Right-handed
- Bowling: Right-arm off-spin
- Role: Batsman

International information
- National side: Pakistan
- Only ODI (cap 169): 19 April 2008 v Bangladesh

Domestic team information
- Years: Team
- 1995–96: Hyderabad
- 1998–present: Karachi
- 1999–00: REDCO Pakistan Limited
- 2000–present: National Bank of Pakistan

Career statistics
Competition	ODI	FC	LA	T20
Matches	1	134	110	15
Runs scored	5	7,299	3,308	242
Batting average	5.00	36.49	35.56	26.88
100s/50s	0/0	13/46	3/27	0/1
Top score	5	176	112	56*
Balls bowled	–	1,616	1,066	78
Wickets	–	15	20	2
Bowling average	–	50.20	48.45	61.00
5 wickets in innings	–	0	0	0
10 wickets in match	–	0	0	0
Best bowling	–	3/13	3/28	1/27
Catches/stumpings	0/–	109/–	46/–	2/–
- Source: CricketArchive, 4 April 2009

Naumanullah (born 20 May 1975) is a Pakistani cricketer who played one match for the Pakistan national cricket team. He is a right-handed batsman and occasional right-arm off-spin bowler.

Having made his first-class debut for Hyderabad in 1995, he has represented the various teams of neighbouring Karachi in regional cricket since 1998, as well as National Bank of Pakistan and Redco Pakistan Limited. Playing for National Bank of Pakistan, he was named best batsman in the 2007–08 Quaid-e-Azam Trophy.

Naumanullah first played for Pakistan A in 2000, before making his One Day International debut against Bangladesh in 2008. He scored five runs in a 150-run victory.
