= Sharjeel Ashraf =

Pakistani cricketer (born 1982)

Personal information
- Born: 16 April 1982 (age 44); Karachi, Pakistan
- Source: Cricinfo, 27 March 2021

Sharjeel Ashraf (born 16 April 1982) is a Pakistani cricketer. He played in 15 first-class and 15 List A matches between 2000 and 2008. He made his Twenty20 debut on 25 April 2005, for Karachi Zebras in the 2004–05 National Twenty20 Cup.
