= Pervez Aziz =

Pakistani cricketer (born 1975)

Personal information
- Born: 23 December 1975 (age 50)
- Source: Cricinfo, 28 March 2021

Pervez Aziz (born 23 December 1975) is a Pakistani cricketer. He played in 41 first-class and 17 List A matches between 1997 and 2007. He made his Twenty20 debut on 25 April 2005, for Rawalpindi Rams in the 2004–05 National Twenty20 Cup.
