= Wasim Naeem =

Pakistani cricketer (born 1975)

Personal information
- Full name: Mohammad Wasim Naeem
- Born: 1 December 1975 (age 50); Karachi, Pakistan
- Source: Cricinfo, 28 March 2021

Mohammad Wasim Naeem (born 1 December 1975) is a Pakistani former cricketer. He played in 19 first-class and 36 List A matches between 1997 and 2010. He made his Twenty20 debut on 27 April 2005, for Karachi Zebras in the 2004–05 National Twenty20 Cup.
