= Stephen John (cricketer) =

Pakistani cricketer (born 1974)

Personal information
- Born: 21 June 1974 (age 52); Sialkot, Pakistan
- Source: Cricinfo, 25 October 2015

Stephen John (born 21 June 1974) is a Pakistani cricket coach and former first-class cricketer who played for Islamabad.
