= Defence Housing Authority cricket team =

Cricket team in Pakistan

Defence Housing Authority were a cricket team sponsored by the Defence Housing Authority in Pakistan. They played first-class cricket between 2003 and 2005.

They competed in the Patron's Trophy. In the 2003–04 season they lost three and drew three of their six matches. In 2004-05 they lost two and drew two.

The highest score was 136, by Asif Zakir against Pakistan Customs in 2003–04. The best innings bowling figures were 6 for 93, and the best match bowling figures were 12 for 192, both by Nasir Khan, also in the match against Pakistan Customs in 2003–04.

In List A matches in the same two seasons they won three matches and lost eight.

== See also ==
- List of Defence Housing Authority cricketers
