= Nawaz Sardar =

Pakistani cricketer (born 1987)

Personal information
- Born: 27 October 1987 (age 39); Sheikhupura, Punjab, Pakistan
- Source: Cricinfo, 28 March 2021

Nawaz Sardar (born 27 October 1987) is a Pakistani cricketer. He played in 26 first-class and 22 List A matches between 2002 and 2012. He made his Twenty20 debut on 26 April 2005, for Sialkot Stallions in the 2004–05 National Twenty20 Cup.
