= Faheem Ahmed =

Pakistani cricketer (born 1980)

Personal information
- Born: 22 December 1980 (age 45); Karachi, Pakistan
- Source: Cricinfo, 25 October 2015

Faheem Ahmed (born 22 December 1980) is a Pakistani first-class cricketer who played for Karachi.
