= Tahir Maqsood =

Pakistani cricketer (born 1981)

Personal information
- Born: 3 March 1981 (age 45); Bahawalpur, Pakistan
- Batting: Right-handed
- Bowling: Right arm medium fast
- Source: Cricinfo, 18 March 2021

Tahir Maqsood (born 3 March 1981) is a Pakistani cricketer. He played in 50 first-class and 15 List A matches between 2001 and 2011.
