= Nasir Khan (Pakistani cricketer) =

Pakistani cricketer (born 1975)

Personal information
- Full name: Nasir Khan
- Born: 31 May 1975 (age 51); Karachi, Pakistan
- Batting: Left-handed
- Bowling: Left-arm medium-fast

Domestic team information
- Years: Team
- 2002–2006: Karachi
- 2003–2005: Defence Housing Authority
- Source: Cricinfo, 27 September 2023

Nasir Khan (born 31 May 1975) is a Pakistani first-class cricketer who played for Karachi cricket team and Defence Housing Authority cricket team.
