= Mohammad Hasnain (cricketer, born 1975) =

Pakistani cricketer (born 1975)

Personal information
- Born: 20 October 1975 (age 51); Karachi, Pakistan
- Batting: Right-handed
- Bowling: Right arm Fast
- Source: Cricinfo, 25 October 2015

Mohammad Hasnain (born 20 October 1975) is a Pakistani former cricketer. He played 50 first-class, 39 List A and 4 Twenty20 matches between 1991 and 2009, principally representing Karachi teams; he also played for Karachi Port Trust and Hyderabad. He also represented Pakistan in three under-19 One Day International matches.
