= Karachi Port Trust cricket team =

Cricket team

Karachi Port Trust (KPT) was a Pakistani domestic cricket team, sponsored by the Karachi Port Trust. They competed in first-class and List A cricket for two seasons, in 2003−04 and 2004–05. They were set to return to first-class cricket in 2015–16, having won the Patron's Trophy Grade II the previous season, but following restructuring of the Quaid-e-Azam Trophy by the Pakistan Cricket Board, they failed to make it through the newly introduced qualifying tournament.

== Playing record ==
=== First-class ===
In 2003–04, the Karachi Port Trust team played five matches in the Patron's Trophy, winning one, losing three and drawing one. The following season they again played five matches, losing three and drawing two, as they finished bottom of their group and were relegated to Grade II.

=== List A cricket ===
Karachi Port Trust lost all ten List A matches they played during the 2003–04 and 2004–05 seasons.

== Leading players ==
Shadab Kabir scored most runs for Karachi Port Trust in first-class cricket, totalling 588 runs at an average of 42.00. He also recorded the highest individual score, 176, against Sui Northern Gas Pipelines Limited, in Karachi Port Trust's only victory. In the same match, Shahid Iqbal took 7 for 19, the team's best bowling figures.

== See also ==
- List of Karachi Port Trust cricketers
