= Fahadullah Khan =

Pakistani cricketer (born 1977)

Personal information
- Born: 18 August 1977 (age 49); Karachi, Pakistan
- Batting: Right-handed
- Bowling: Right-arm offbreak
- Source: Cricinfo, 27 October 2015

Fahadullah Khan (born 18 August 1977) is a Pakistani first-class cricketer who played for Karachi.
