= Hasnain Qayyum =

Personal information
- Full name: Hasnain Qayyum Khan
- Born: 15 January 1975; Lahore, Punjab, Pakistan
- Batting: Right-handed
- Bowling: Right-arm medium

Domestic team information
- Years: Team
- 1994/95: PIA
- 1999/00: Redco Ltd

Career statistics
Competition	First-class	List A
Matches	14	14
Runs scored	749	307
Batting average	39.42	27.90
100s/50s	1/4	0/2
Top score	161*	68
Balls bowled	348	–
Wickets	3	–
Bowling average	55.00	–
5 wickets in innings	0	–
10 wickets in match	0	–
Best bowling	2/43	–
Catches/stumpings	12/–	7/–
- Source: CricketArchive, 26 June 2014

Hasnain Qayyum Khan (born 15 January 1975) is a Pakistani former cricketer who played first-class cricket from 1994 to 2000.

A right-handed batsman, Hasnain Qayyum played one Under-19 Test for Pakistan in 1993-94. He made his first-class debut for Pakistan International Airlines in the 1994-95 Patron's Trophy but, batting at various positions in the order, he scored only 135 runs in four matches and was omitted when the team reached the finals.

He was a member of the Redco Pakistan Limited team that won the non-first-class Grade II Patron's Trophy competition in 1998-99. Redco were promoted to the top level for the 1999-2000 season. They finished runners-up in the National One-day Championship that was held in September and October 1999, and when they competed in the Quaid-e-Azam Trophy, beginning in late October, Qayyum was appointed captain.

Redco won three of their 10 matches and finished in the middle of Pool B, and never competed at first-class level again, but Qayyum had a personally successful season. He scored 614 runs at an average of 51.16, with a top score of 161 not out against Rawalpindi.

He played no further first-class cricket.
