= Sanaullah Khan (Balochistan cricketer) =

Pakistani cricketer (born 1978)

Personal information
- Born: 12 May 1978 (age 48)
- Source: Cricinfo, 28 March 2021

Sanaullah Khan (born 12 May 1978) is a Pakistani cricketer. He played in 27 first-class and 15 List A matches between 1998 and 2011. He made his Twenty20 debut on 25 April 2005, for Quetta Bears in the 2004–05 National Twenty20 Cup.
