= 2003–04 Quaid-e-Azam Trophy =

Cricket tournament

- Dates: 9 February 2004 – 15 April 2004
- Administrator: Pakistan Cricket Board
- Cricket format: First-class
- Tournament format: Round-robin
- Host: Pakistan
- Champions: Faisalabad (1st title)
- Participants: 9
- Matches: 36
- Most runs: Shoaib Khan (774)
- Most wickets: Zahid Saeed (48)
- Official website: www.pcb.com.pk

The 2003–04 Quaid-e-Azam Trophy was one of two first-class domestic cricket competitions held in Pakistan during the 2003–04 season. It was contested by nine regional association teams and organised as a single round-robin league of four-day matches.

Faisalabad won the trophy for the first time, finishing top of the championship table with 45 points, ahead of Sialkot on 33. Shoaib Khan of Peshawar was the tournament's leading run-scorer with 774 runs, while Zahid Saeed of Sialkot took 48 wickets, the most in the competition.

== League stage ==
All nine teams played one another once. However, for the purpose of deciding the championship, points gained against Hyderabad and Quetta did not count towards the championship table. The complete league table is shown below, along with each team's championship points total.

Team	Pld	W	WLF	L	DWF	DLF	ND	A	Pts	Championship pts
Faisalabad	8	4	1	1	1	0	0	1	45	45
Sialkot	8	3	1	3	0	1	0	0	33	33
Karachi	8	3	0	2	1	0	0	2	30	30
Peshawar	8	3	0	3	0	0	2	0	27	18
Lahore	8	2	1	4	1	0	0	0	27	15
Multan	8	2	1	5	0	0	0	0	24	9
Rawalpindi	8	1	1	4	0	1	1	0	15	6
Quetta	8	3	0	3	0	0	0	2	27	0
Hyderabad	8	0	1	2	0	1	1	3	6	0

The Championship pts column determined the title. Points taken from matches against Hyderabad and Quetta were excluded for championship purposes.
Position determined by total points, most matches won, fewest matches lost, followed by adjusted net run rate (matches with no result, i.e. those where both teams did not complete their first innings, were disregarded); matches finishing in a draw were decided on first innings scores, with points awarded as follows:
- Win = 9 points
- Win having trailed on first innings = 6 points
- Draw having led on first innings = 3 points
- Loss, draw having trailed on first innings, or draw with no result based on the first innings = 0 points
