= Zeeshan Khan (Multan cricketer) =

Pakistani cricketer (born 1976)

Personal information
- Born: 20 October 1976 (age 50); Multan, Pakistan
- Source: Cricinfo, 25 October 2022

Zeeshan Khan (born 20 October 1976) is a Pakistani first-class cricketer who played for Multan.
