= Rafatullah Mohmand =

Pakistani cricketer

Personal information
- Full name: Rafatullah Mohmand
- Born: 6 November 1976 (age 50); Peshawar, Pakistan
- Batting: Right-handed
- Bowling: Slow left-arm orthodox

International information
- National side: Pakistan
- T20I debut (cap 65): 26 November 2015 v England
- Last T20I: 30 November 2015 v England

Domestic team information
- Years: Team
- 1996/97–2006/07: Peshawar
- 1999/00: Redco Pakistan Limited
- 2000/01–2014/15: Water and Power Development Authority
- 2002/03–2008/09: Habib Bank Limited
- 2007/08–2008/09: Khyber Pakhtunkhwa
- 2017: Islamabad United

Career statistics
Competition	T20I	FC	LA
Matches	3	166	124
Runs scored	39	7,403	4,441
Batting average	13	29.26	39.30
100s/50s	0/0	12/35	6/32
Top score	23	302*	141*
Balls bowled	–	650	506
Wickets	–	9	17
Bowling average	–	42.77	23.17
5 wickets in innings	–	0	0
10 wickets in match	–	0	0
Best bowling	–	2/23	3/16
Catches/stumpings	0/–	115/–	59/–
- Source: Cricinfo, 16 September 2019

Rafatullah Mohmand (born 6 November 1976) is a Pakistani cricket coach and former cricketer who played as a right-handed batsman and left-arm orthodox bowler.

He made his Twenty20 International debut for Pakistan against England on 26 November 2015, becoming the oldest player to make his T20I debut for Pakistan.

== Personal life ==
His elder brother Asmatullah Mohmand played first-class cricket in Pakistan from 1995 to 2004.

== Cricket career ==
Since his debut in 1996 Mohmand has played as an opening batsman for several first-class teams in Pakistan. He made his first century in 1999-2000 when he scored 213 out of a team total of 395 to help Redco Pakistan Limited to an innings victory over Faisalabad. In 2009-10, opening the batting for Water and Power Development Authority, he made 302 not out against Sui Southern Gas Company, adding 580 for the second wicket with Aamer Sajjad. It is the highest second-wicket partnership, and the second-highest partnership of all, in first-class cricket history.

He toured Australia with Pakistan A in 2006, playing one first-class match and three List A matches.

In 2009 he was invited to play for Afghanistan to strengthen their batting by their coach Kabir Khan, and was included in the 15-member Afghanistan team named ahead of the 2009 ICC World Cup Qualifiers in South Africa. However, Afghanistan withdrew Rafatullah from their squad after deciding he was not eligible to play for them.

In 2012-13 he was the highest scorer in the President's Cup One-Day Tournament, with 425 runs in six matches for Water and Power Development Authority, including three centuries.

In 2017 he was picked as a replacement for Sharjeel Khan by Islamabad United in the 2017 Pakistan Super League.

== Coaching career ==
Since his retirement he has become a coach, including being the assistant coach to the Khyber Pakhtunkhwa U19 Blues.
