= Javed Qadeer =

Pakistani cricketer (born 1976)

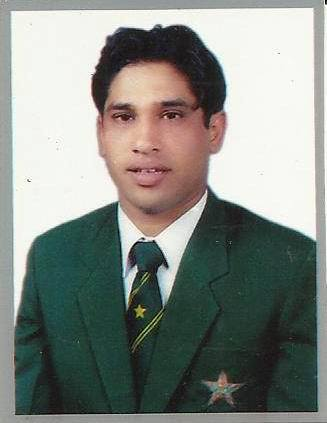

Cricket information
- Batting: Right-handed
- Bowling: Wicket-keeper

Career statistics
Competition	ODI
Matches	1
Runs scored	12
Batting average	12.00
100s/50s	0/0
Top score	12
Catches/stumpings	1/–
- Source: , 3 May 2006

Javed Qadeer (born 25 August 1976) is a former Pakistani cricketer who played one One Day International in 1995 as a wicket-keeper. He was born at Karachi.

According to one incident, quoted by Mirza Iqbal Baig, Wasim Akram asked for a wicket keeper from the selectors hours before a Sharjah Match. Javed Qadeer played and also worked at the National Stadium, Karachi but on the way to Airport someone handed him Coca-Cola and he missed the flight drinking it and delayed his much awaited arrival as PCB had to arrange a passenger seat requesting much higher authorities. He now coaches at the DHA Sports Club, Moin Khan Academy, A.O Cricket Academy.
