= Jahangir Mirza (cricketer) =

Pakistani cricketer (born 1987)

Personal information
- Born: 28 February 1987 (age 39); Lahore, Pakistan
- Source: Cricinfo, 8 November 2015

Jahangir Mirza (born 28 February 1987) is a Pakistani first-class cricketer who played for Lahore cricket team.
