= Malik Aftab (Karachi cricketer) =

Pakistani cricketer (born 1982)

Personal information
- Full name: Malik Aftab
- Born: 24 June 1982 (age 44); Karachi, Pakistan
- Source: Cricinfo, 1 December 2021

Malik Aftab (born 24 June 1982) is a Pakistani first-class cricketer who played for the Karachi cricket team.
