= Mohammad Farrukh =

Pakistani cricketer (born 1978)

Personal information
- Born: 27 December 1978 (age 47); Karachi, Pakistan
- Batting: Right-handed
- Bowling: Right-arm off spin
- Source: Cricinfo, 27 October 2015

Mohammad Farrukh (born 27 December 1978) is a Pakistani first-class cricketer who played in Grade 1 for Karachi. Farrukh Started his first-class career in 1998 debuting for Karachi Blues, led by Rashid Latif. Before playing first-class cricket Farrukh was involved with the Pakistan under-19 team and was a debutant in 1996 along with Shahid Afridi, Shoaib Malik and Abdul Razzaq and toured the West Indies. In 1998 he was selected to play against England U19 and was a top performer for Karachi U19. Beside playing other distinguished domestic competitions, Farrukh traveled to England, Ireland and Australia to participate in Premier League Cricket.
