= 2010–11 Quaid-e-Azam Trophy =

Cricket tournament

- Dates: 23 October 2010 – 17 January 2011
- Administrator: Pakistan Cricket Board
- Cricket format: First-class
- Tournament format(s): Two division round-robin league and finals
- Host: Pakistan
- Champions: Habib Bank Limited (2nd title)
- Participants: 22
- Matches: 113
- Official website: www.pcb.com.pk

The 2010–11 Quaid-e-Azam Trophy was one of two first-class domestic cricket competitions that were held in Pakistan during the 2010–11 season. It was the 53rd edition of the Quaid-e-Azam Trophy, contested by 22 teams representing regional cricket associations and departments, (Note: The top level of domestic cricket in Pakistan was historically played by teams representing regional cricket associations and departments, which were owned and run by corporations, institutions or government departments.) and was followed in the schedule by the Pentangular Cup, contested by five teams representing the four provinces and the federal areas.

There was a change in format for the Quaid-e-Azam Trophy from the previous season, with the teams being split into two divisions: the six best regions and departments from 2009–10 in Division One and the remaining ten teams, seven regions and three departments, in Division Two. At the end of the season, the lowest ranked region and department in division one department were relegated to division two, with the top ranked region and department on division two being promoted; in addition, the lowest ranked department in division two was relegated into the Patron's Trophy (Grade II) competition for 2011–12. Each division was played in a round-robin of four-day matches starting on 23 October 2010, with five-day finals between the top two teams to determine the winners.

Habib Bank Limited beat Pakistan International Airlines by 5 wickets in the Division One final to win the trophy. It was the first time the Quaid-e-Azam Trophy had been decided in a day/night match. Four players were fined for a variety of offences during the final, including the use of abusive language and ball tampering. State Bank of Pakistan won the Division Two final on first innings scores after the match was extended to a seventh day in order to achieve a result; no play had been possible on the first and fourth days due to rain, and the sixth day was lost when Salman Taseer, the Governor of Punjab, was assassinated.

== Division standings ==
The top teams in each division (highlighted) advanced to the finals.

Division One
Team	Pld	W	L	D	A	Pts
Habib Bank Ltd.	11	6	3	2	0	57
Pakistan International Airlines	11	5	0	5	1	57
Rawalpindi	11	6	3	2	0	54
Water and Power Dev. Auth.	11	6	3	2	0	54
Zarai Taraqiati Bank Ltd.	11	5	2	4	0	51
National Bank of Pakistan	11	4	0	6	1	45
Sialkot	11	3	4	4	0	30
Karachi Blues	11	3	6	2	0	27
Islamabad	11	2	6	3	0	21
Sui Northern Gas Pipelines Ltd. (R)	11	2	4	5	0	18
Faisalabad	11	2	3	6	0	15
Multan (R)	11	0	20	1	0	0

Division Two
Team	Pld	W	L	D	A	Pts
Khan Research Labs.	9	5	0	4	0	51
State Bank of Pakistan (P)	9	4	1	4	0	42
Abbottabad (P)	9	4	1	4	0	39
Karachi Whites	9	4	1	4	0	39
Lahore Ravi	9	4	5	0	0	36
Pakistan Television (R)	9	3	2	4	0	36
Lahore Shalimar	9	3	3	3	0	27
Hyderabad	9	1	3	5	0	18
Peshawar	9	1	5	3	0	15
Quetta	9	0	8	1	0	0

bold Finalist
(P) Promoted
(R) Relegated

Position determined by total points, most matches won after having a lead on first innings, fewest matches lost, followed by adjusted net run rate (matches with no result, i.e. those where both teams did not complete their first innings, were disregarded); matches finishing in a draw were decided on first innings scores, with points awarded as follows:
- Win = 9 points
- Win having tied or trailed on first innings = 6 points
- Draw having led on first innings = 3 points
- Loss, draw having trailed or with no result on first innings, or abandoned without a ball bowled = 0 points

== Finals ==
=== Division Two ===
31 December 2010–6 January 2011
Scorecard

State Bank of Pakistan	v	Khan Research Laboratories
303 (85.5 overs); Naved Yasin 77 (158); Yasir Arafat 9/108 (25.5 overs)		159 (49.5 overs); Ali Naqvi 54 (103); Mohammad Naved 7/61 (19.5 overs)

Match drawn; State Bank of Pakistan won on first innings
Rawalpindi Cricket Stadium, Rawalpindi
Umpires: Ahsan Raza and Saleem Badar
Player of the match: Yasir Arafat (State Bank of Pakistan)

- Khan Research Laboratories won the toss and elected to field.

=== Division One ===
13–17 January 2011 (D/N)
Scorecard

Pakistan International Airlines	v	Habib Bank Limited
228 (73.5 overs); Kamran Sajid 90 (222); Danish Kaneria 4/66 (22.5 overs)		313 (99.1 overs); Imran Farhat 109 (172); Aizaz Cheema 3/90 (31 overs)
319 (103.5 overs); Fahad Iqbal 84 (183); Kamran Hussain 3/49 (16 overs)		236/5 (78.1 overs); Aftab Alam 106 (230); Kamran Sajid 2/23 (7.5 overs)

Habib Bank Limited won by 5 wickets
National Stadium, Karachi
Umpires: Riazuddin and Zameer Haider
Player of the match: Aftab Alam (Habib Bank Limited)

- Habib Bank Limited won the toss and elected to field.
