= Ahmer Saeed =

Pakistani cricketer

Personal information
- Full name: Ahmer Saeed
- Born: 21 November 1978 (age 47); Karachi, Pakistan
- Batting: Right-handed
- Bowling: Right-arm off-break
- Role: Batting all-rounder

Domestic team information
- Years: Team
- 1996–2005: Karachi
- FC debut: 28 October 1996 Karachi v Rawalpindi
- Last FC: 27 November 2005 Karachi v Peshawar
- LA debut: 20 September 1999 REDCO Pakistan Limited v Rawalpindi
- Last LA: 10 April 2005 Karachi Port Trust v Pakistan International Airlines

Career statistics
Competition	FC	LA	T20
Matches	39	18	2
Runs scored	1,579	385	9
Batting average	26.76	32.08	4.50
100s/50s	3/6	1/1	0/0
Top score	105*	100*	9
Balls bowled	1,315	341	6
Wickets	15	11	0
Bowling average	49.53	27/63	–
5 wickets in innings	0	0	–
10 wickets in match	0	0	–
Best bowling	3/70	3/6	–
Catches/stumpings	25/–	5/–	1/–
- Source: CricketArchive, 18 November 2009

Ahmer Saeed (born 21 November 1978) is a Pakistani cricketer. A former captain of the Pakistan U-19 cricket team, Saeed went on to play first-class cricket for Karachi from 1997 until 2005. A right-handed batsman and occasional right-arm off break bowler, Saeed amassed 1,579 runs at 26.76 in the four day game, with three centuries, and 385 one day runs at 32.08 with a single century. His occasional bowling snared 15 first-class wickets at 49.53, and 11 one day wickets at a more successful 27.63.

Saeed came to first-class cricket from a career in the Pakistani Youth Test team between 1995 and 1997, where he played 11 matches and returned 602 runs at 33.44 and seven wickets at 61.85. He also played 12 Youth One Day International games, scoring 371 runs at 30.91 and taking 12 wickets at a contrasting 19.00. He earned a Player of the Match award on 8 January 1997, during a Youth ODI against England where he scored 63 and took one wicket.

Saeed made a brief foray into Twenty20 cricket with two consecutive matches in April 2005, however made only nine runs and went for 12 in his only over with the ball. Having left the one day game over the winter of 2004/05, he played his final match on 27 November 2005, departing from the game with four runs and 10 wicketless overs. He went on to play a handful of matches for various club teams, and for the Karachi Port Trust, whom he captained for a time.
