= Shadab Kabir =

Pakistani cricketer (born 1977)

Personal information
- Full name: Mohammad Shadab Kabir Siddiqi
- Born: 12 November 1977 (age 49); Karachi, Pakistan
- Batting: Left-handed
- Bowling: Right-arm offbreak

International information
- National side: Pakistan (1996–2002)
- Test debut (cap 137): 25 July 1996 v England
- Last Test: 16 January 2002 v Bangladesh
- ODI debut (cap 105): 1 September 1996 v England
- Last ODI: 23 September 1996 v India

Career statistics
Competition	Test	ODI
Matches	5	3
Runs scored	148	–
Batting average	21.14	–
100s/50s	0/1	–
Top score	55	–
Catches/stumpings	11/–	1/–
- Source: ESPNCricinfo, 4 February 2017

Mohammad Shadab Kabir Siddiqi (born 12 November 1977) is a Pakistani former cricketer who played in five Test matches and three One Day Internationals for the national team from 1996 to 2002.
