= Pakistan Customs cricket team =

Cricket team

Pakistan Customs cricket team were a first-class cricket side of no fixed abode that played in domestic tournaments in Pakistan from 1972–73 to 2009–10, representing the Pakistan Customs service. They never won the Quaid-e-Azam Trophy, but did win the Patron's Trophy once.

They played 122 matches, with 25 wins, 56 losses and 41 draws. The highest score by a Pakistan Customs batsman, and only double century, was 210 not out by Imraan Mohammad against Gujranwala in 1999–2000. Their best innings bowling figures were 8 for 64 by Nadeem Iqbal against Habib Bank Limited in 1998–99.

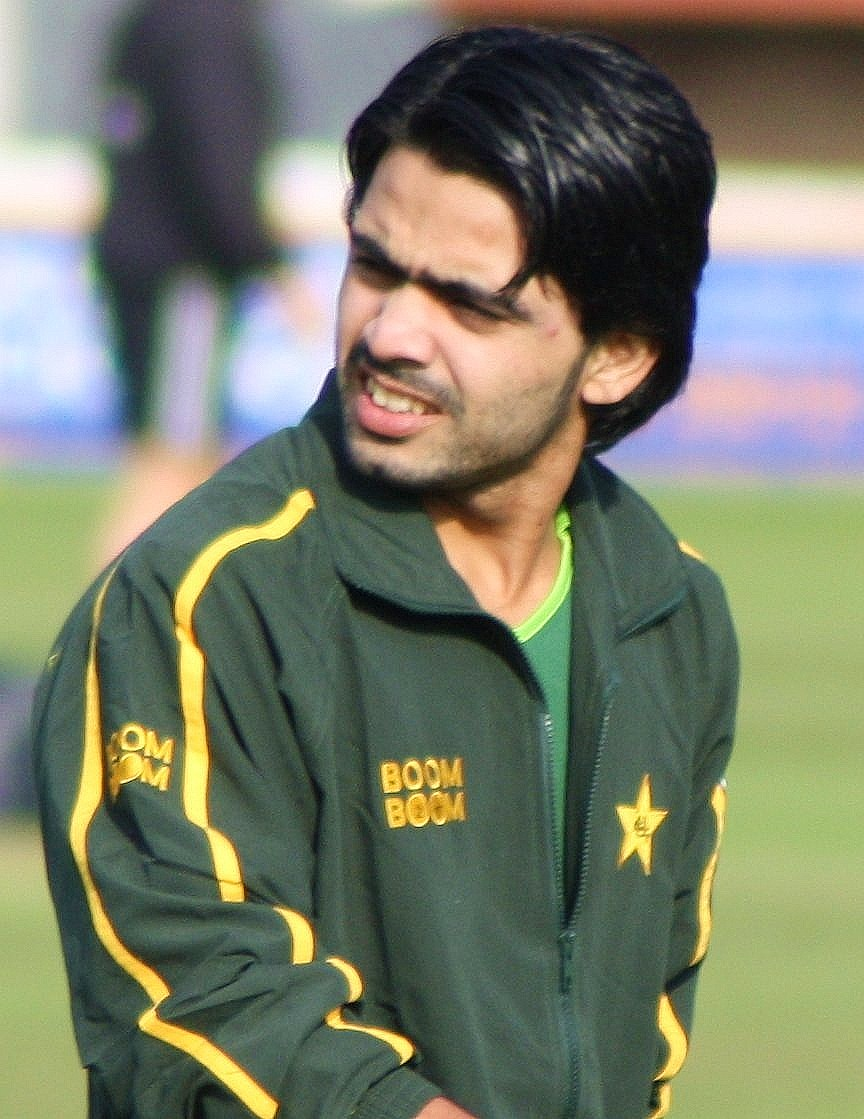
Pakistan Customs cricketer Fawad Alam

== Honours ==
- Quaid-e-Azam Trophy (0)
- Patron's Trophy (1)
- 2000-01

== Notable players ==
- (Australia) Fawad Ahmed
- (Pakistan) Fawad Alam
- (Afghanistan) Hamid Hassan
- (Pakistan) Rana Naved-ul-Hasan
- (Afghanistan) Mohammad Nabi
- (Pakistan) Mohammad Sami
- (Pakistan) Murtaza Hussain
- (Singapore) Saad Janjua
- (England) Bilal Shafayat
- (Scotland) Qasim Sheikh
- (Pakistan) Ali Imran Zaidi
