= 2015–16 National T20 Cup =

- Dates: 1 – 15 September 2015
- Administrator: Pakistan Cricket Board
- Cricket format: Twenty20
- Tournament format(s): Round Robin and Knockout Stage
- Host(s): Islamabad; Rawalpindi
- Champions: Peshawar Panthers (2nd title)
- Participants: 18
- Matches: 45
- Most runs: Faisal Mubashir (BS) (357)
- Most wickets: Imran Khan (PP) (16)

The Haier Q8 T20 CUP 2015–2016 was the 12th season of the National T20 Cup in Pakistan, sponsored by Haier.The qualifying round of the event ran from September 1 to 5, 2015. Eight teams will participate in qualifying round. The Winner of both semi-finals of qualifying round shall make it to the main round.

Twelve teams will contest for Cool & Cool Presents Haier Mobile T20 CUP 2015–2016 in the main tournament. The main tournament will commence on September 8 and its semifinals will be played on September 14 and the final took place on September 15.

== Venue ==
Islamabad
Diamond Cricket Ground	Marghzar Cricket Ground
Matches: 10	Matches: 2
Rawalpindi
Rawalpindi Cricket Stadium
Matches: 33

== Teams ==
Qualified Teams for main group stage
Teams
Abbottabad Falcons
Faisalabad Wolves
Hyderabad Hawks
Islamabad Leopards
Karachi Zebras
Lahore Lions
Multan Tigers
Peshawar Panthers
Rawalpindi Rams
Sialkot Stallions

Teams for Qualifying round
Teams
AJK Jaguars
Bahawalpur Stags
Dera Murad Jamali Ibexes
FATA Cheetas
Karachi Dolphins
Lahore Eagles
Larkana Bulls
Quetta Bears

== Tournament ==
The tournament was held between 1 and 15 September 2015. Tournament is a Qualifying Round, Round Robin and Knockout tournament.

=== Qualifying round ===
Teams qualified for the Main Round
Teams eliminated at Qualifying Round

==== Qualifying Group A ====
Team	Pld	W	L	NR	NRR	Pts
Lahore Eagles	3	3	0	0	+2.335	6
Quetta Bears	3	1	2	0	−0.710	2
AJK Jaguars	3	1	2	0	−1.000	2
Larkana Bulls	3	1	2	0	−1.102	2

Fixtures and Results

1 September 2015
12:00
Scorecard

Quetta Bears; 141/4 (20 overs)	v	Larkana Bulls; 142/3 (16.3 overs)
Bismillah Khan 79* (56); Ali Asgar 2/23 (3 overs)		Asif Babar 74* (37); Sher Hasan 1/23 (4 overs)

Larkana Bulls won by 7 wickets
Rawalpindi Cricket Stadium, Rawalpindi
Umpires: Asif Yaqoob and Tahir Rasheed
Player of the match: Asif Babar (Larkana Bulls)

- Quetta Bears won the toss and elected to bat

1 September 2015
16:00 (D/N)
Scorecard

Lahore Eagles; 151/4 (20 overs)	v	AJK Jaguars; 69 (14.4 overs)
Mohammad Akhlaq 51 (32); Usman Maroof 1/19 (3 overs)		Irfan Talib 22 (21); Salman Agha 3/17 (4 overs)

Lahore Eagles won by 82 runs
Rawalpindi Cricket Stadium, Rawalpindi
Umpires: Jamil Kamran and Mohammad Rashid
Player of the match: Mohammad Akhlaq (Lahore Eagles)

- Lahore Eagles won the toss and elected to bat

2 September 2015
16:00 (D/N)
Scorecard

Quetta Bears; 100 (19.1 overs)	v	Lahore Eagles; 101/1 (14 overs)
Arun Lal 24 (19); Ataullah 3/13 (3.1 overs)		Imam ul Haq 57* (41)

Lahore Eagles won by 9 wickets
Rawalpindi Cricket Stadium, Rawalpindi
Umpires: Imtiaz Iqbal and Shameem Ansari
Player of the match: Salman Agha (Lahore Eagles)

- Quetta Bears won the toss and elected to bat

2 September 2015
20:00 (D/N)
Scorecard

Larkana Bulls; 65 (13.4 overs)	v	AJK Jaguars; 123/8 (20 overs)
Ayaz Jamali 16 (16); Usman Maroof 3/9 (1.4 overs)		Hasan Raza 50 (46); Afraz Khoso 4/24 (4 overs)

AJK Jaguars won by 58 runs
Rawalpindi Cricket Stadium, Rawalpindi
Umpires: Qaiser Waheed and Irfan Dilshad
Player of the match: Hasan Raza (AJK Jaguars)

- Larkana Bulls won the toss and elected to field.

3 September 2015
20:00 (D/N)
Scorecard

Quetta Bears; 147/6 (15 overs)	v	AJK Jaguars; 144/6 (20 overs)
Mohibullah 54 (30); Irfan Talib 2/27 (4 overs)		Irfan Talib 33 (27); Mohammad Irfan 2/17 (4 overs)

Quetta Region won by 4 wickets
Rawalpindi Cricket Stadium, Rawalpindi
Umpires: Abid Naqvi and Nasar Khan
Player of the match: Mohibullah (Quetta Bears)

- Quetta Bears won the toss and elected to field.
- Twenty20 debut – Ahmed Shah (Quetta Bears)

4 September 2015
20:00 (D/N)
Scorecard

Lahore Eagles; 150/5 (19.3 overs)	v	Larkana Bulls; 146/5 (20 overs)
Imam-ul-Haq 67 (53); Ali Asghar 2/24 (4 overs)		Bilal Irshad 45 (47); Ataullah 1/15 (3 overs)

Lahore Eagles won by 5 wickets
Rawalpindi Cricket Stadium, Rawalpindi
Umpires: Asif Yaqoob and Khalid Mahmood
Player of the match: Imam-ul-Haq (Lahore Eagles)

- Lahore Eagles won the toss and elected to field.

==== Qualifying Group B ====
Team	Pld	W	L	NR	NRR	Pts
Karachi Dolphins	3	3	0	0	+1.067	6
Bahawalpur Stags	3	2	1	0	+0.200	4
FATA Cheetas	3	1	2	0	−0.025	2
Dera Murad Jamali Ibexes	3	0	3	0	−1.250	0

Fixtures and Results

1 September 2015
20:00 (D/N)
Scorecard

Karachi Dolphins; 153/7 (20 overs)	v	FATA Cheetas; 145/7 (20 overs)
Shahzaib Hasan 53 (44); Mohammad Sarwar 4/32 (4 overs)		Fawad Khan 39 (35); Anwar Ali 2/29 (4 overs)

Karachi Dolphins won by 8 runs
Rawalpindi Cricket Stadium, Rawalpindi
Umpires: Tahir Shah and Waleed Yaqub
Player of the match: Shahzaib Hasan (Karachi Dolphins)

- FATA Cheetas won the toss and elected to field.

2 September 2015
12:00
Scorecard

Bahawalpur Stags; 130/6 (20 overs)	v	DM Jamali Ibexes; 127/7 (20 overs)
Faisal Mubashir 66 * (42); Nasir Khan 2/27 (4 overs)		Najeebullah 33 (26); Mohammad Imran 2/22 (4 overs)

Bahawalpur Stags won by 3 runs
Rawalpindi Cricket Stadium, Rawalpindi
Umpires: Asif Yaqoob and Aslam Bareach
Player of the match: Faisal Mubashir (Bahawalpur Stags)

- Bahawalpur Stags won the toss and elected to bat.

3 September 2015
12:00
Scorecard

Karachi Dolphins; 172/5 (20 overs)	v	DM Jamali Ibexes; 119/9 (20 overs)
Khalid Latif 51 (46); Imran Khan 2/30 (4 overs)		Najeebullah 35 (25); Mohammad Asim 2/19 (4 overs)

Karachi Dolphins won by 53 runs
Rawalpindi Cricket Stadium, Rawalpindi
Umpires: Sajid Afridi and Majid Hussain
Player of the match: Khalid Latif (Karachi)

- DM Jamali Ibexes won the toss and elected to field.
- Mohammad Asim (DMJI) made his T20 debut.

3 September 2015
16:00 (D/N)
Scorecard

Bahawalpur Stags; 156/8 (20 overs)	v	FATA Cheetas; 146 (19.1 overs)
Faisal Mubashir 79* (52); Mohammad Sarwar 2/23 (3 overs)		Rehan Afridi 36 (37); Zahir Siddiqi 3/21 (4 overs)

Bahawalpur Stags won by 10 runs
Rawalpindi Cricket Stadium, Rawalpindi
Umpires: Mir Dad (Pak) and Riazuddin (Pak)
Player of the match: Faisal Mubashir (Bahawalpur Stags)

- Bahawalpur Stags won the toss and elected to bat.
- Aamer Ijaz (Bahawalpur) and Mohammad Raza (FATA) made their T20 debuts.

4 September 2015
12:00
Scorecard

Bahawalpur Stags; 165/5 (20 overs)	v	Karachi Dolphins; 168/3 (20 overs)
Mohammad Yasir 81 (53); Abdul Aamer 3/42 (4 overs)		Shahzaib Hasan 63 (35); Mohammad Zahir Siddiqi 2/31 (4 overs)

Karachi Dolphins won by 3 runs
Rawalpindi Cricket Stadium, Rawalpindi
Umpires: Ahsan Raza and Saqib Khan
Player of the match: Shahzaib Hasan (Karachi Dolphins)

- Bahawalpur Stags won the toss and elected to field
- Twenty20 debuts – Ali Ahmed and Mohammad Imtiaz (Bahawalpur Stags)

4 September 2015
16:00 (D/N)
Scorecard

DM Jamali Ibexes; 111 (19.2 overs))	v	FATA Cheetas; 112/4 (17.3 overs)
Abid Ali 25 (30); Mohammad Sarwar 2/16 (3.2 overs)		Asad Afridi 49 (35); Mohammad Asim 2/16 (3 overs)

FATA Cheetas won by 6 wickets
Rawalpindi Cricket Stadium, Rawalpindi
Umpires: Shozab Raza and Rashid Riaz
Player of the match: Asad Afridi (FATA Cheetas)

- DM Jamali Ibexes won the toss and elected to field.

==== Semi-finals ====
5 September 2015
16:00 (D/N)
Scorecard

Lahore Eagles; 152/8 (20 overs)	v	Bahawalpur Stags; 153/4 (19.3 overs)
Sami Aslam 35 (23); Mohammad Imran 2/20 (4 overs)		Faisal Mubashir 51* (37); Agha Salman 1/23 (4 overs)

Bahawalpur Stags won by 6 wickets
Rawalpindi Cricket Stadium, Rawalpindi
Umpires: Ahmed Shahab and Khalid Mahmood
Player of the match: Faisal Mubashir (Bahawalpur Stags)

- Lahore Eagles won the toss and elected to bat
- Twenty20 debut: Riasat Ali (Bahawalpur Stags)

5 September 2015
20:00 (D/N)
Scorecard

Karachi Dolphins; 184/4 (20 overs)	v	Quetta Bears; 56/3 (8 overs)
Khalid Latif 54 (39); Jalat Khan 3/24 (4 overs)		Bismillah Khan 32 (21); Faraz Ahmed 1/3 (1 over)

Karachi Dolphins won by 18 runs (D/L method)
Rawalpindi Cricket Stadium, Rawalpindi
Umpires: Ahsan Raza and Shozab Raza
Player of the match: Khalid Latif (Karachi Dolphins)

- Quetta Bears won the toss and elected to field
- Twenty20 debut: Irfanullah (Quetta Bears)

=== Main Round ===
Teams qualified for the Semi-final
Teams eliminated at group stage

==== Group A ====
Team	Pld	W	L	NR	NRR	Pts
Multan Tigers	5	4	1	0	+0.477	8
Sialkot Stallions	5	4	1	0	+0.477	8
Rawalpindi Rams	5	2	3	0	+0.169	4
Bahawalpur Stags	5	2	3	0	−1.444	4
Hyderabad Hawks	5	2	3	0	−0.461	4
Karachi Zebras	5	1	4	0	−0.060	2

Fixtures and Results

8 September 2015
10:00
Scorecard

Hyderabad Hawks; 190/2 (18.4 overs)	v	Multan Tigers; 186/4 (20 overs)
Sharjeel Khan 91 (45); Majid Ali 1/30 (3 overs)		Sohaib Maqsood 77 (50); Nasir Awais 2/33 (4 overs)

Hyderabad Hawks won by 8 wickets
Marghzar Cricket Ground, Islamabad
Umpires: Abid Naqvi and Nasar Khan
Player of the match: Sharjeel Khan (Hyderabad Hawks)

- Hyderabad Hawks won the toss and elected to field
- Twenty20 debut: Babar Khan (Hyderabad Hawks)

8 September 2015
12:00
Scorecard

Karachi Zebras; 191/6 (20 overs)	v	Sialkot Stallions; 198/5 (20 overs)
Ahsan Ali 76 (46); Bilawal Bhatti 2/22 (4 overs)		Mukhtar Ahmed 123 (67); Mir Hamza 2/30 (4 overs)

Sialkot Stallions won by 7 runs
Rawalpindi Cricket Stadium, Rawalpindi
Umpires: Ahmed Shahab and Ahsan Raza

- Sialkot Stallions won the toss and elected to bat
- Twenty20 debuts: Saifullah Bangash and Saud Shakeel (Karachi Zebras), Amad Butt (Sialkot Stallions)

8 September 2015
20:00
Scorecard

Rawalpindi Rams; 129/3 (15.1 overs)	v	Bahawalpur Stags; 125/9 (20 overs)
Nasir Jamshed 62* (36); Faisal Mubashir 1/10 (1.1 overs)		Aamer Ijaz 33 (29); Mohammad Amir 3/23 (4 overs)

Rawalpindi Rams won by 7 wickets
Rawalpindi Cricket Stadium, Rawalpindi
Umpires: Shameem Ansari and Zameer Haider
Player of the match: Nasir Jamshed (Rawalpindi Rams)

- Bahawalpur Stags won the toss and elected to bat

9 September 2015
10:00 (D/N)
Scorecard

Hyderabad Hawks; 159/9 (20 overs)	v	Sialkot Stallions; 163/7 (20 overs)
Shoaib Laghari 29 (22); Bilal Asif 3/11 (4 overs)		Bilal Asif 53 (58); Babar Khan 2/20 (4 overs)

Sialkot Stallions won by 4 runs
Diamond Club Ground, Islamabad
Umpires: Nasar Khan and Saqib Khan
Player of the match: Bilal Asif (Sialkot Stallions)

- Hyderabad who chose to field

9 September 2015
14:00
Scorecard

Karachi Zebras; 132 (19.4 overs)	v	Bahawalpur Stags; 174/4 (20 overs)
Sheharyar Ghani 32 (24); Saadat Munir 3/28 (3.4 overs)		Moinuddin 58 (33); Tabish Khan 1/35 (4 overs)

Bahawalpur Stags won by 42 runs
Diamond Club Ground, Islamabad
Umpires: Abid Naqvi and Aslam Bareach
Player of the match: Faisal Mubashir (Bahawalpur Stags)

- Karachi Zebras won the toss who chose to field

9 September 2015
20:00 (D/N)
Scorecard

Multan Tigers; 133/2 (17.5 overs)	v	Rawalpindi Rams; 132 (19.5 overs)
Kamran Akmal 51 (35); Hammad Azam 2/29 (4 overs)		Awais Zia 33 (20); Kashif Naved 2/15 (3 overs)

Multan Tigers won by 8 wickets
Rawalpindi Cricket Stadium, Rawalpindi
Umpires: Ahmed Shahab and Zameer Haider
Player of the match: Kamran Akmal (Multan Tigers)

- Rawalpindi Rams won the toss and elected to bat.

10 September 2015
12:00

Hyderabad Hawks	v	Bahawalpur Stags

Rawalpindi Cricket Stadium, Rawalpindi

9 September 2015
20:00 (D/N)

Multan Tigers	v	Sialkot Stallions

Diamond Club Ground, Islamabad

10 September 2015
20:00 (D/N)

Karachi Zebras	v	Rawalpindi Rams

Rawalpindi Cricket Stadium, Rawalpindi

11 September 2015
10:00

Multan Tigers	v	Bahawalpur Stags

Diamond Club Ground, Islamabad

11 September 2015
14:00

Hyderabad Hawks	v	Karachi Zebras

Diamond Club Ground, Islamabad

12 September 2015
12:00

Multan Tigers	v	Karachi Zebras

Rawalpindi Cricket Stadium, Rawalpindi

12 September 2015
20:00 (D/N)

Rawalpindi Rams	v	Sialkot Stallions

Rawalpindi Cricket Stadium, Rawalpindi

13 September 2015
14:00

Sialkot Stallions	v	Bahawalpur Stags

Diamond Club Ground, Islamabad

13 September 2015
20:00 (D/N)

Hyderabad Hawks	v	Rawalpindi Rams

Rawalpindi Cricket Stadium, Rawalpindi

==== Group B ====
Team	Pld	W	L	NR	NRR	Pts
Peshawar Panthers	5	4	1	0	+0.517	8
Karachi Dolphins	5	4	1	0	+0.613	8
Abbottabad Falcons	5	3	2	0	+1.081	4
Lahore Lions	5	2	3	0	−0.962	4
Faisalabad Wolves	5	1	4	0	−0.530	2
Islamabad Leopards	5	1	4	0	−0.657	2

Fixtures and Results

8 September 2015
14:00
Scorecard

Abbottabad Falcons	v	Karachi Dolphins

Marghzar Cricket Ground, Islamabad

8 September 2015
16:00 (D/N)
Scorecard

Lahore Lions	v	Islamabad Leopards

Rawalpindi Cricket Stadium, Rawalpindi
Umpires: Mohammad Sajid and Riazuddin

- Islamabad Leopards won the toss and elected to bat

9 September 2015
12:00

Abbottabad Falcons	v	Lahore Lions

Rawalpindi Cricket Stadium, Rawalpindi

9 September 2015
16:00 (D/N)

Faisalabad Wolves	v	Peshawar Panthers

Rawalpindi Cricket Stadium, Rawalpindi

10 September 2015
10:00

Faisalabad Wolves	v	Karachi Blues

Diamond Club Ground, Islamabad

10 September 2015
16:00 (D/N)

Islamabad Leopards	v	Peshawar Panthers

Rawalpindi Cricket Stadium, Rawalpindi

11 September 2015
12:00

Abbottabad Falcons	v	Faisalabad Wolves

Rawalpindi Cricket Stadium, Rawalpindi

11 September 2015
16:00 (D/N)

Lahore Lions	v	Peshawar Panthers

Rawalpindi Cricket Stadium, Rawalpindi

11 September 2015
20:00 (D/N)

Islamabad Leopards	v	Karachi Dolphins

Rawalpindi Cricket Stadium, Rawalpindi

12 September 2015
10:00

Lahore Lions	v	Karachi Dolphins

Diamond Club Ground, Islamabad

12 September 2015
14:00

Abbottabad Falcons	v	Peshawar Panthers

Diamond Club Ground, Islamabad

12 September 2015
16:00 (D/N)

Islamabad Leopards	v	Faisalabad Wolves

Rawalpindi Cricket Stadium, Rawalpindi

13 September 2015
10:00

Abbottabad Falcons	v	Islamabad Leopards

Diamond Club Ground, Islamabad

13 September 2015
12:00

Karachi Dolphins	v	Peshawar Panthers

Rawalpindi Cricket Stadium, Rawalpindi

13 September 2015
16:00 (D/N)

Lahore Lions	v	Faisalabad Wolves

Rawalpindi Cricket Stadium, Rawalpindi

=== Knockout stage ===
Semifinals
A1	Multan Tigers	181/9 (20 overs)
B2	Karachi Dolphins	189/8 (20 overs)
B1	Peshawar Panthers	170/5 (18.4 overs)
A2	Sialkot Stallions	169/7 (20 overs)

Final
SF1	Karachi Dolphins	177/8 (20 overs)
SF2	Peshawar Panthers	178/3 (18.5 overs)

==== Semi-finals ====
14 September 2014
16:00 (D/N)
Scorecard

Multan Tigers; 181/9 (20 overs)	v	Karachi Dolphins; 189/8 (20 overs)
Aamer Yamin 45* (20); Abdul Ameer 3/21 (4 overs)		Fawad Alam 60* (42); Majid Ali 3/30 (4 overs)

Karachi Region Blues won by 8 runs
Rawalpindi Cricket Stadium, Rawalpindi
Umpires: Tahir Hasan and Zameer Haider
Player of the match: Abdul Ameer (Karachi Region Blues)

- Karachi Region Blues won the toss and elected to bat

14 September 2014
20:00 (D/N)
Scorecard

Peshawar Panthers; 170/5 (18.4 overs)	v	Sialkot Stallions; 169/7 (20 overs)
Rafatullah Mohmand 78 (51); Amad Butt 2/36 (3.4 overs)		Adeel Malik 70* (46); Imran Khan 2/34 (4 overs)

Peshawar Region won by 5 wickets
Rawalpindi Cricket Stadium, Rawalpindi
Umpires: Ghaffar Kazmi and Khalid Mahmood
Player of the match: Rafatullah Mohmand (Peshawar Region)

- Peshawar Region won the toss and elected to field

==== Final ====
15 September 2014
19:00 (D/N)
Scorecard

Karachi Dolphins; 177/8 (20 overs)	v	Peshawar Panthers; 178/3 (18.5 overs)
Sarfraz Ahmed 47* (26); Imran Khan Jr 3/26 (4 overs)		Mohammad Rizwan 58* (34); Shahid Afridi 1/21 (4 overs)

Peshawar Region won by 7 wickets
Rawalpindi Cricket Stadium, Rawalpindi
Umpires: Ahsan Raza and Shozab Raza
Player of the match: Mohammad Rizwan (Peshawar Region)

- Peshawar Region won the toss and elected to field
