= 2013–14 National T20 Cup =

Cricket tournament

- Dates: 6 – 16 February 2014
- Administrator: Pakistan Cricket Board
- Cricket format: Twenty20
- Tournament format(s): Round Robin and Knockout Stage
- Host(s): Rawalpindi, Islamabad
- Champions: Lahore Lions (3rd title)
- Participants: 17
- Matches: 35
- Most runs: Younis Khan (201)
- Most wickets: Aizaz Cheema (11)

The 2013–14 Faysal Bank T20 Cup was the tenth season of the Faysal Bank T20 Cup in Pakistan, sponsored by Faysal Bank. The tournament was held from 6 to 16 February 2014 at Rawalpindi Cricket Stadium, Rawalpindi; Diamond Ground, Islamabad; Marghazar Ground, Islamabad and National Ground, Islamabad. A total of 17 teams were divided into four groups, the most teams in the tournament's history. The highlight of this tournament was the inclusion for the first time of three new teams: FATA Cheetahs, Dera Murad Jamali Ibexes and Larkana Bulls. Broadcasting rights were given to PTV Sports which aired all of the matches live.

== Venue ==
The twin cities of Rawalpindi and Islamabad were chosen as host cities for this tournament and four stadiums were picked to host the matches. Theses were Rawalpindi Cricket Stadium in Rawalpindi and the Diamond Cricket Ground, National Cricket Ground and Marghzar Cricket Ground in Islamabad. 14 matches were held in Islamabad while 20 matches, all of the knockout stage matches, were held in Rawalpindi.

Islamabad
Diamond Cricket Ground	National Cricket Ground	Marghzar Cricket Ground
Matches: 5	Matches: 4	Matches: 5
Rawalpindi
Pindi Stadium
Matches: 20

== Team Sponsors ==
The Faysal Bank T20 Cup 2014 Team Sponsors Press Conference, held in Islamabad on 5 February 2014, announced brand new logos of the teams as well as new sponsors.

Team name	Sponsor
Karachi Dolphins	Haier
Karachi Zebras	Zong
Lahore Lions	Brighto Paints
Lahore Eagles	Zong
Faisalabad Wolves	Adamjee Group
Sialkot Stallions	United Mobile
Islamabad Leopards	Zong
Bahawalpur Stags	Magic Depoxi
Dera Murad Jamali Ibexes	Nobel TV
Abbottabad Falcons	Mughal Steel
Quetta Bears	Zong
Rawalpindi Rams	Acson
Hyderabad Hawks	Magic Epoxy
Multan Tigers	Five Star Foam
FATA Cheetas	Nobel TV
Peshawar Panthers	Zong
Larkana Bulls	Mughal Steel

== Tournament ==
The tournament was scheduled to be held between 6 and 16 February 2014. The tournament was a Round Robin and Knockout tournament.

=== Group stage ===
A total of 17 teams divided into four groups participated in this tournament. The top two teams from each group qualified for the quarter-finals. A total of 28 matches were played between 6 and 12 February 2014.

Teams that qualified for the quarter-final stage
Teams that were eliminated during or after the group stage

==== Group A ====
Team	Pld	W	L	NR	NRR	Pts
Sialkot Stallions	4	3	1	0	+2.406	6
Larkana Bulls	4	2	1	1	−0.801	5
Karachi Dolphins	4	2	1	1	−0.273	5
Quetta Bears	4	1	2	1	−1.465	3
Hyderabad Hawks	4	0	3	1	−0.804	1

6 February 2014
11:00
Scorecard

Hyderabad Hawks	v	Karachi Dolphins

Match abandoned without a ball bowled.
National Cricket Ground, Islamabad
Umpires: Ijaz Ahmed and Naushad Khan

- No Toss
- Match abandoned due to rain.

6 February 2014
12:00
Scorecard

Quetta Bears	v	Larkana Bulls

Match abandoned without a ball bowled.
Rawalpindi Cricket Stadium, Rawalpindi
Umpires: Aftab Gillani and Nadeem Iqbal

- No Toss
- Match abandoned due to rain.

7 February 2014
11:00
Scorecard

Hyderabad Hawks; 99 (15.4 Overs)	v	Quetta Bears; 100/5 (15.5 Overs)
Azeem Ghumman 27 (26); Nazar Hussain 3/17 (3.4 Overs)		Bismillah Khan 51 (41); Nauman Ali 1/14 (4 Overs)

Quetta Bears won by 5 wickets
National Cricket Ground, Islamabad
Umpires: Javed Ashraf and Qaiser Waheed

- Quetta Bears won the toss and elected to field
- Shahzad Tareen (Quetta Bears) made his T20 debut.

7 February 2014
11:00
Scorecard

Sialkot Stallions; 166/6 (20 Overs)	v	Larkana Bulls; 69/9 (20 Overs)
Shakeel Ansar 54* (40); Zahid Mahmood 2/25 (4 Overs)		Zafar Ali 20* (37); Bilawal Bhatti 3/7 (3 Overs)

Sialkot Stallions won by 97 runs
Marghzar Cricket Ground, Islamabad
Umpires: Mir Dad and Sajid Afridi

- Larkana Bulls won the toss and elected to field
- Ali Mudassar and Zafar Ali (Larkana Bulls) both made their T20 debuts.

8 February 2014
11:00
Scorecard

Hyderabad Hawks; 156/5 (20 Overs)	v	Larkana Bulls; 157/6 (19.4 Overs)
Aqeel Anjum 43 (47); Zahid Mahmood 3/13 (4 Overs)		Ahsan Ali 43 (26); Nauman Ali 2/31 (4 Overs)

Larkana Bulls won by 4 wickets
Marghzar Cricket Ground, Islamabad
Umpires: Hakeem Shah and Sajid Afridi

- Larkana Bulls won the toss and elected to field

8 February 2014
11:00
Scorecard

Karachi Dolphins; 150/5 (20 Overs)	v	Quetta Bears; 138/9 (20 Overs)
Khurram Manzoor 38 (46); Ghulam Mohammad 2/22 (4 Overs)		Bismillah Khan† 46 (39); Babar Rehman 2/17 (3 Overs)

Karachi Dolphins won by 12 runs
National Cricket Ground, Islamabad
Umpires: Nadeem Iqbal and Tahir Shah

- Quetta Bears won the toss and elected to field

9 February 2014
12:00
Scorecard

Karachi Dolphins; 94 (18.3 Overs)	v	Larkana Bulls; 98/1 (13.1 Overs)
Khurram Manzoor 51 (47); Imtiaz Ali 4/16 (4 Overs)		Ahsan Ali 54* (38); Abdul Ameer 1/10 (2 Overs)

Larkana Bulls won by 9 wickets
Diamond Club Ground, Islamabad
Umpires: Sajid Afridi and Zameer Haider

- Larkana Bulls won the toss and elected to field

9 February 2014
16:00 (D/N)
Scorecard

Sialkot Stallions; 191/5 (20 Overs)	v	Hyderabad Hawks; 152/4 (20 Overs)
Imran Nazir 93 (51); Nauman Ali 1/19 (4 Overs)		Azeem Ghumman 42 (35); Bilawal Bhatti 2/16 (4 Overs)

Sialkot Stallions won by 39 runs
Rawalpindi Cricket Stadium, Rawalpindi
Umpires: Riazuddin and Tahir Hussain
Player of the match: Imran Nazir (Sialkot Stallions)

- Sialkot Stallions won the toss and elected to bat

10 February 2014
11:00
Scorecard

Sialkot Stallions; 154/8 (20 Overs)	v	Quetta Bears; 82/9 (20 Overs)
Haris Sohail 66 (44); Fareeduddin 4/11 (2 Overs)		Nazar Hussain 26* (27); Raza Hasan 3/17 (4 Overs)

Sialkot Stallions won by 72 runs
Diamond Club Ground, Islamabad
Umpires: Asif Yaqoob and Naushad Khan

- Sialkot Stallions won the toss and elected to bat
- Ata-ur-Rehman (Quetta Bears) made his T20 debut.

11 February 2014
16:00 (D/N)
Scorecard

Sialkot Stallions; 91 (19.4 Overs)	v	Karachi Dolphins; 92/4 (17.1 Overs)
Shoaib Malik 21 (31); Abdul Ameer 4/14 (3.4 Overs)		Sheharyar Ghani 32* (26); Raza Hasan 2/21 (4 Overs)

Karachi Dolphins won by 6 wickets
Rawalpindi Cricket Stadium, Rawalpindi
Umpires: Ahmed Shahab and Ahsan Raza

- Sialkot Stallions won the toss and elected to bat

==== Group B ====
Team	Pld	W	L	NR	NRR	Pts
Multan Tigers	3	2	0	1	+1.275	5
Karachi Zebras	3	2	1	0	−0.795	4
Rawalpindi Rams	3	1	2	0	+1.006	2
FATA Cheetas	3	0	2	1	−2.029	1

6 February 2014
11:00
Scorecard

FATA Cheetas	v	Multan Tigers

Match abandoned without a ball bowled
Marghzar Cricket Ground, Islamabad
Umpires: Masood Ahmed and Mohammad Asif

- No Toss
- Match abandoned due to rain

7 February 2014
11:00
Scorecard

Karachi Zebras; 97/5 (14 Overs)	v	FATA Cheetas; 96 (14 Overs)
Hasan Raza 45 (36); Asif Afridi 3/11 (3 Overs)		Khushdil Shah 38 (32); Akbar-ur-Rehman 2/16 (3 Overs)

Karachi Zebras won by 1 run
Diamond Club Ground, Islamabad
Umpires: Ijaz Ahmed and Majid Hussain

- FATA Cheetas won the toss and elected to field
- Match was reduced to 14 overs per innings due to rain

8 February 2014
16:00 (D/N)
Scorecard

Rawalpindi Rams; 180/5 (20 Overs)	v	FATA Cheetas; 112/8 (20 Overs)
Umar Amin 82 (47); Riaz Afridi 3/16 (4 Overs)		Riaz Afridi 46* (24); Akhtar Ayub 3/23 (4 Overs)

Rawalpindi Rams won by 68 runs
Rawalpindi Cricket Stadium, Rawalpindi
Umpires: Ahsan Raza and Zameer Haider
Player of the match: Umar Amin (Rawalpindi Rams)

- FATA Cheetas won the toss and elected to field

9 February 2014
12:00
Scorecard

Multan Tigers; 140/7 (20 Overs)	v	Karachi Zebras; 91 (17 Overs)
Zeeshan Ashraf 40 (21); Akbar-ur-Rehman 2/20 (3 Overs)		Fakhar Zaman 32 (18); Zulfiqar Babar 4/16 (4 Overs)

Multan Tigers won by 49 runs
Rawalpindi Cricket Stadium, Rawalpindi
Umpires: Ahsan Raza and Ghaffar Kazmi
Player of the match: Zulfiqar Babar (Multan Tigers)

- Karachi Zebras won the toss and elected to field

10 February 2014
16:00
Scorecard

Multan Tigers; 183/5 (20 Overs)	v	Rawalpindi Rams; 181/8 (20 Overs)
Kashif Naved 44 (26); Sohail Tanvir 2/33 (4 Overs)		Babar Naeem 42 (36); Kashif Naved 3/22 (2 Overs)

Multan Tigers won by 2 runs
Rawalpindi Cricket Stadium, Rawalpindi
Umpires: Ahsan Raza and Zameer Haider
Player of the match: Kashif Naved (Multan Tigers)

- Rawalpindi Rams won the toss and elected to field

12 February 2014
16:00
Scorecard

Rawalpindi Rams; 139/8 (20 overs)	v	Karachi Zebras; 141/5 (19.3 overs)
Umar Amin 37 (31); Tabish Khan 4/34 (4 overs)		Fakhar Zaman 86 (63); Nasir Malik 2/27 (3.3 overs)

Karachi Zebras won by 5 wickets
Rawalpindi Cricket Stadium, Rawalpindi
Umpires: Ahsan Raza and Zameer Haider
Player of the match: Fakhar Zaman (Karachi Zebras)

- Rawalpindi Rams won the toss and elected to bat

==== Group C ====
Team	Pld	W	L	NR	NRR	Pts
Faisalabad Wolves	3	2	0	1	+1.585	5
Islamabad Leopards	3	2	1	0	+0.800	4
Peshawar Panthers	3	1	1	1	−0.457	3
Lahore Eagles	3	0	3	0	−1.521	0

6 February 2014
16:00 (D/N)
Scorecard

Faisalabad Wolves	v	Peshawar Panthers

Match abandoned without a ball bowled
Rawalpindi Cricket Stadium, Rawalpindi
Umpires: Javed Ashraf and Tahir Hussain

- No toss

7 February 2014
16:00 (D/N)
Scorecard

Islamabad Leopards; 118/7 (20 Overs)	v	Lahore Eagles; 101/9 (20 Overs)
Faizan Riaz 24 (28); Mohammad Khalil 2/19 (4 Overs)		Taufeeq Umar 41 (45); Imad Wasim 3/16 (4 Overs)

Islamabad Leopards won by 17 runs
Rawalpindi Cricket Stadium, Rawalpindi
Umpires: Aftab Gillani and Nadeem Iqbal
Player of the match: Imad Wasim (Islamabad Leopards)

- Lahore Eagles won the toss and elected to field
- Ikhlaq Butt (Lahore Eagles) made his T20 debut.

8 February 2014
11:00
Scorecard

Islamabad Leopards; 134/6 (20 Overs)	v	Peshawar Panthers; 88 (15.4 Overs)
Babar Azam 55 (52); Zohaib Khan 2/21 (4 Overs)		Azam Khan 18 (13); Imad Wasim 3/12 (2 Overs)

Islamabad Leopards won by 46 runs
Diamond Club Ground, Islamabad
Umpires: Ahmed Shahab and Ijaz Ahmed

- Peshawar Panthers won the toss and elected to field

9 February 2014
12:00
Scorecard

Faisalabad Wolves; 158/7 (20 Overs)	v	Islamabad Leopards; 143/8 (20 Overs)
Asif Ali 73* (43); Umar Gul 3/45 (4 Overs)		Imad Wasim 54 (37); Mohammad Talha 3/10 (4 Overs)

Faisalabad Wolves won by 15 runs
National Cricket Ground, Islamabad
Umpires: Kamal Merchant and Khalid Mahmood

- Islamabad Leopards won the toss and elected to field
- Asadullah Sumari (Islamabad Leopards) made his T20 debut.

10 February 2014
12:00
Scorecard

Lahore Eagles; 104/9 (20 Overs)	v	Peshawar Panthers; 107/3 (15.3)
Abid Ali 24 (30); Imran Khan 3/16 (4 Overs)		Adil Amin 40* (25); Junaid Zia 2/19 (4 Overs)

Peshawar Panthers won by 7 wickets
Rawalpindi Cricket Stadium, Rawalpindi
Umpires: Khalid Mahmood and Riazuddin
Player of the match: Adil Amin (Peshawar Panthers) and Imran Khan (Peshawar Panthers)

- Peshawar Panthers won the toss and elected to field

11 February 2014
12:00
Scorecard

Lahore Eagles; 93/8 (20 Overs)	v	Faisalabad Wolves; 94/2 (13.4 Overs)
Kamran Akmal 30 (37); Saeed Ajmal 3/16 (4 Overs)		Ali Waqas 31* (38); Tanzeel Altaf 1/10 (1.4 Overs)

Faisalabad Wolves won by 8 wickets
Rawalpindi Cricket Stadium, Rawalpindi
Umpires: Khalid Mahmood and Riazuddin
Player of the match: Saeed Ajmal (Faisalabad Wolves)

- Lahore Eagles won the toss and elected to bat

==== Group D ====
Team	Pld	W	L	NR	NRR	Pts
Abbottabad Falcons	3	2	1	0	+1.511	4
Lahore Lions	3	2	1	0	+1.535	4
Dera Murad Jamali Ibexes	3	1	1	1	−2.840	3
Bahawalpur Stags	3	0	2	1	−2.259	1

6 February 2014
11:00
Scorecard

Bahawalpur Stags	v	Dera Murad Jamali Ibexes

Match abandoned without a ball bowled
Diamond Club Ground, Islamabad
Umpires: Hakeem Shah and Nasar Khan

- No toss
- Match abandoned due to rain

7 February 2014
11:00
Scorecard

Dera Murad Jamali Ibexes; 35/5 (5 Overs)	v	Abbottabad Falcons; 24/7 (5 Overs)
Mohammad Ayub 8 (4); Sanaullah 8 (4); Yasir Shah 2/9 (1 Over)		Yasir Hameed 11 (12); Kamran Sajid 2/1 (1 Over)

Dera Murad Jamali Ibexes won by 11 runs
Rawalpindi Cricket Stadium, Rawalpindi
Umpires: Masood Ahmed and Zameer Haider
Player of the match: Kamran Sajid (Dera Murad Jamali Ibexes)

- Abbottabad Falcons won the toss and elected to field
- Match reduced to 5 overs per innings due to rain

8 February 2014
12:00
Scorecard

Bahawalpur Stags; 142 (20 Overs)	v	Lahore Lions; 145/2 (18.5 Overs)
Hamid Ali 46 (31); Aizaz Cheema 3/33 (4 Overs)		Mohammad Hafeez 73* (46); Abdul Rehman 1/20 (4 Overs)

Lahore Lions won by 8 wickets
Rawalpindi Cricket Stadium, Rawalpindi
Umpires: Mir Dad and Naseer Khan
Player of the match: Mohammad Hafeez (Lahore Lions)

- Lahore Lions won the toss and elected to field

9 February 2014
12:00
Scorecard

Lahore Lions; 180/3 (20 Overs)	v	Dera Murad Jamali Ibexes; 98 (17.4 Overs)
Umar Akmal 68 (41); Najaf Shah 1/27 (4 Overs)		Mohammad Ayub 26 (28); Aizaz Cheema 2/6 (3 Overs)

Lahore Lions won by 82 runs
Marghzar Cricket Ground, Islamabad
Umpires: Asif Yaqoob and Majid Hussain

- Dera Murad Jamali Ibexes won the toss and elected to field

10 February 2014
12:00
Scorecard

Abbottabad Falcons; 200/1 (20 Overs)	v	Bahawalpur Stags; 123/8 (20 Overs)
Yasir Hameed 97* (68); Abdul Rehman 1/60 (4 Overs)		Ansar Javed 32* (37); Khalid Usman 3/17 (4 Overs)

Abbottabad Falcons won by 77 runs
National Cricket Stadium, Islamabad
Umpires: Mohammad Asif and Tahir Shah

- Bahawalpur Stags won the toss and elected to field

12 February 2014
12:00
Scorecard

Abbottabad Falcons; 136/4 (20 Overs)	v	Lahore Lions; 134/9 (20 Overs)
Younus Khan 63* (57); Aizaz Cheema 2/19 (4 Overs)		Wahab Riaz 29 (14); Yasir Shah 3/19 (4 Overs)

Abbottabad Falcons won by 2 runs
Rawalpindi Cricket Stadium, Rawalpindi
Umpires: Kamal Merchant and Riazuddin

- Lahore Lions won the toss and elected to field

=== Knockout stage ===
Quarter-finals
A1	Sialkot Stallions	116/6 (20 overs)
C2	Islamabad Leopards	117/3 (19 overs)
B1	Multan Tigers	134/6 (20 overs)
D2	Lahore Lions	145/6 (20 overs)
C1	Faisalabad Wolves	121 (20 overs)
A2	Larkana Bulls	88 (18.5 overs)
D1	Abbottabad Falcons	133/6 (19.1 overs)
B2	Karachi Zebras	129/5 (20 overs)

Semi-finals
QF1	Islamabad Leopards	109 (18.4 overs)
QF2	Lahore Lions	188/4 (20 overs)
QF3	Faisalabad Wolves	186/4 (20 overs)
QF4	Abbottabad Falcons	137/5 (20 overs)

Final
SF1	Lahore Lions	131/7 (20 overs)
SF2	Faisalabad Wolves	130/9 (20 overs)

==== Quarter-finals ====
13 February 2014
12:00
Scorecard

Sialkot Stallions; 116/6 (20 overs)	v	Islamabad Leopards; 117/3 (19 overs)
Shoaib Malik 49* (52); Zohaib Ahmed 2/13 (4 overs)		Afaq Raheem 30 (37); Nayyer Abbas 1/13 (3 overs)

Islamabad Leopards won by 7 wickets
Rawalpindi Cricket Stadium, Rawalpindi
Umpires: Ghaffar Kazmi and Riazuddin
Player of the match: Zohaib Ahmed (Islamabad Leopards)

- Islamabad Leopards won the toss and elected to field

13 February 2014
16:00 (D/N)
Scorecard

Multan Tigers; 134/6 (20 overs)	v	Lahore Lions; 145/6 (20 overs)
Kashif Naved 43* (28); Adnan Rasool 2/21 (4 overs)		Saad Nasim 61* (54); Zulfiqar Babar 3/25 (4 overs)

Lahore Lions won by 11 runs
Rawalpindi Cricket Stadium, Rawalpindi
Umpires: Ahmed Shahab and Ahsan Raza
Player of the match: Saad Nasim (Lahore Lions)

- Lahore Lions won the toss and elected to bat

14 February 2014
12:00
Scorecard

Faisalabad Wolves; 121 (20 overs)	v	Larkana Bulls; 88 (18.5 overs)
Khurram Shehzad 38 (43); Mohammad Siddiq 3/25 (4 overs)		Ayaz Jamali 34 (36); Saeed Ajmal 4/14 (3.5 overs)

Faisalabad Wolves won by 33 runs
Rawalpindi Cricket Stadium, Rawalpindi
Umpires: Ghaffar Kazmi and Kamal Merchant
Player of the match: Asad Ali (Faisalabad Wolves)

- Larkana Bulls won the toss and elected to field

14 February 2014
16:00 (D/N)
Scorecard

Abbottabad Falcons; 133/6 (19.1 overs)	v	Karachi Zebras; 129/5 (20 overs)
Younus Khan 55* (35); Tariq Haroon 3/14 (4 overs)		Hasan Raza 47 (53); Junaid Khan 2/17 (4 overs)

Abbottabad Falcons won by 4 wickets
Rawalpindi Cricket Stadium, Rawalpindi
Umpires: Khalid Mahmood and Zameer Haider
Player of the match: Younus Khan (Abbottabad Falcons)

- Karachi Zebras won the toss and elected to bat

==== Semi-finals ====
15 February 2014
12:00
Scorecard

Islamabad Leopards; 109 (18.4 overs)	v	Lahore Lions; 188/4 (20 overs)
Mohammad Irfan 26 (22); Mohammad Hafeez 2/8 (3 overs)		Nasir Jamshed 60 (33); Babar Azam 1/31 (4 overs)

Lahore Lions won by 79 runs
Rawalpindi Cricket Stadium, Rawalpindi
Umpires: Ahsan Raza and Zameer Haider
Player of the match: Mohammad Hafeez (Lahore Lions)

- Islamabad Leopards won the toss and elected to field

15 February 2014
16:00 (D/N)
Scorecard

Faisalabad Wolves; 186/4 (20 overs)	v	Abbottabad Falcons; 135/7 (20 overs)
Farrukh Shehzad 84* (63); Khalid Usman 1/20 (4 overs)		Adnan Raees 30* (31); Ehsan Adil 2/12 (3 overs)

Faisalabad Wolves won by 51 runs
Rawalpindi Cricket Stadium, Rawalpindi
Umpires: Ahmed Shahbab and Riazuddin
Player of the match: Farrukh Shehzad (Faisalabad Wolves)

- Faisalabad Wolves won the toss and elected to bat

==== Final ====
16 February 2014
16:00 (D/N)
Scorecard

Lahore Lions; 131/7 (20 overs)	v	Faisalabad Wolves; 130/9 (20 overs)
Saad Nasim 43* (43); Asad Ali 3/32 (4 overs)		Ali Waqas 63 (52); Wahab Riaz 2/11 (4 overs)

Lahore Lions won by 3 wickets
Rawalpindi Cricket Stadium, RawalpindiLahore
Umpires: Ahsan Raza and Kamal Merchant
Player of the match: Saad Nasim (Lahore Lions)

- Faisalabad Wolves won the toss and elected to bat

== Statistics ==
Leading run scorers
Runs	Player	Team	Matches
201	Younis Khan	Abbottabad Falcons	5
172	Yasir Hameed	Abbottabad Falcons	5
171	Ahmed Shehzad	Lahore Lions	6
152	Mohammad Hafeez	Lahore Lions	6
144	Shoaib Malik	Sialkot Stallions	5

Leading wicket takers
Wickets	Player	Team	Matches
11	Aizaz Cheema	Lahore Lions	6
9	Saeed Ajmal	Faisalabad Wolves	4
8	Zulfiqar Babar	Multan Tigers	3
8	Raza Hasan	Sialkot Stallions	5
8	Ehsan Adil	Faisalabad Wolves	5
8	Umar Gul	Islamabad Leopards	5
