= 2014–15 National T20 Cup =

Cricket tournament

- Dates: 17 – 28 September 2014
- Administrator: Pakistan Cricket Board
- Cricket format: Twenty20
- Tournament format(s): Round Robin and Knockout Stage
- Host: Karachi
- Champions: Peshawar Panthers (1st title)
- Participants: 18
- Matches: 40
- Most runs: Asad Shafiq (Karachi Dolphins) (214)
- Most wickets: Imran Khan (Peshawar Panthers) (12)

The Haier T20 Cup 2014-15 was the eleventh season of the National T20 Cup in Pakistan, sponsored by Haier. The tournament started on September 17, 2014, but was relocated from Multan to Karachi due to torrential rains and flooding in Punjab. A total of 18 teams divided into four groups participated in the tournament.

== Venue ==
| City | Venue | Capacity | Matches |
|---|---|---|---|
| Karachi, Sindh | National Stadium | 34,228 | 40 |
2014–15 National T20 Cup is located in Pakistan

== Teams ==
Teams
Abbottabad Falcons
AJK Jaguars
Bahawalpur Stags
Dera Murad Jamali Ibexes
Faisalabad Wolves
FATA Cheetas
Hyderabad Hawks
Islamabad Leopards
Karachi Dolphins
Karachi Zebras
Lahore Eagles
Lahore Lions
Larkana Bulls
Multan Tigers
Peshawar Panthers
Quetta Bears
Rawalpindi Rams
Sialkot Stallions

== Tournament ==
The tournament was scheduled to be held between 17 and 28 September 2014. Tournament is a Round Robin and Knockout tournament.

=== Group stage ===
Teams qualified for the semi-final
Teams eliminated at group stage

==== Group A ====
| Team | Pld | W | L | NR | NRR | Pts |
|---|---|---|---|---|---|---|
| Sialkot Stallions | 4 | 4 | 0 | 0 | +1.347 | 8 |
| Karachi Dolphins | 4 | 3 | 1 | 0 | +1.206 | 6 |
| Hyderabad Hawks | 4 | 2 | 2 | 0 | -0.291 | 4 |
| Quetta Bears | 4 | 1 | 3 | 0 | -1.612 | 2 |
| Larkana Bulls | 4 | 0 | 4 | 0 | -0.535 | 0 |

17 September
Scorecard

| Hyderabad Hawks; 164/7 (20 overs) | v | Quetta Bears; 157/7 (20 overs) |

Hyderabad Hawks won by 7 runs
National Stadium, Karachi

17 September (D/N)
Scorecard

| Karachi Dolphins; 123/6 (20 overs) | v | Larkana Bulls; 125/5 (18.4 overs) |

Karachi Dolphins won by 5 wickets
National Stadium, Karachi

18 September
Scorecard

| Larkana Bulls; 164/6 (20 overs) | v | Quetta Bears; 165/0 (19 overs) |

Quetta Bears won by 10 wickets
National Stadium, Karachi

18 September (D/N)
Scorecard

| Hyderabad Hawks; 164/5 (20 overs) | v | Sialkot Stallions; 165/5 (19 overs) |

Sialkot Stallions won by 8 wickets
National Stadium, Karachi

19 September
Scorecard

| Larkana Bulls; 149/6 (20 overs) | v | Sialkot Stallions; 153/7 (19.1 overs) |

Sialkot Stallions won by 3 wickets
National Stadium, Karachi

19 September
Scorecard

| Karachi Dolphins; 196/6 (20 overs) | v | Quetta Bears; 110/5 (20 overs) |

Karachi Dolphins won by 86 runs
National Stadium, Karachi

20 September
Scorecard

| Sialkot Stallions; 171/4 (20 overs) | v | Quetta Bears; 127/7 (20 overs) |

Sialkot Stallions won by 44 runs
National Stadium, Karachi

20 September
Scorecard

| Karachi Dolphins; 122/1 (16.2 overs) | v | Hyderabad Hawks; 119/8 (20 overs) |

Karachi Dolphins won by 9 wickets
National Stadium, Karachi

21 September
Scorecard

| Hyderabad Hawks; 154/3 (19 overs) | v | Larkana Bulls; 151/7 (20 overs) |

Hyderabad Hawks won by 7 wickets
National Stadium, Karachi

21 September (D/N)
Scorecard

| Karachi Dolphins; 150/8 (20 overs) | v | Sialkot Stallions; 155/1 (15.4 overs) |

Sialkot Stallions won by 9 wickets
National Stadium, Karachi

==== Group B ====
| Team | Pld | W | L | NR | NRR | Pts |
|---|---|---|---|---|---|---|
| Multan Tigers | 3 | 2 | 1 | 0 | +0.733 | 4 |
| Rawalpindi Rams | 3 | 2 | 1 | 0 | -0.205 | 4 |
| Karachi Zebras | 3 | 1 | 2 | 0 | +0.171 | 2 |
| FATA Cheetas | 3 | 1 | 2 | 0 | +0.666 | 2 |

==== Group C ====
| Team | Pld | W | L | NR | NRR | Pts |
|---|---|---|---|---|---|---|
| Peshawar Panthers | 4 | 4 | 0 | 0 | +1.412 | 8 |
| Islamabad Leopards | 3 | 2 | 1 | 0 | +0.887 | 4 |
| Faisalabad Wolves | 3 | 2 | 1 | 0 | +0.694 | 4 |
| Lahore Eagles | 4 | 1 | 3 | 0 | +0.032 | 2 |
| AJK Jaguars | 4 | 0 | 4 | 0 | -2.809 | 0 |

==== Group D ====
| Team | Pld | W | L | NR | NRR | Pts |
|---|---|---|---|---|---|---|
| Lahore Lions | 3 | 2 | 1 | 0 | +2.138 | 4 |
| Abbottabad Falcons | 3 | 2 | 1 | 0 | +1.610 | 4 |
| Bahawalpur Stags | 3 | 1 | 2 | 0 | -0.595 | 2 |
| Dera Murad Jamali Ibexes | 3 | 1 | 2 | 0 | -3.051 | 2 |

=== Knockout stage ===
Semifinals
A1 | Peshawar Panthers | 156/7 (20)
C1 | Sialkot Stallions | 150 (20)
B1 | Lahore Lions | 179/7 (20)
D1 | Multan Tigers | 170 (20)

Final
SF1 | Lahore Lions | 133/9 (20)
SF2 | Peshawar Panthers | 134/3 (19.2)

==== Semi-finals ====
27 September 2014
11:30
Scorecard

| Peshawar Panthers; 156/7 (20 overs) | v | Sialkot Stallions; 150/7 (20 overs) |
| Rafatullah Mohmand 35 (24); Hassan Ali 2/21 (4 overs) | | Shahid Yousuf 56 (35); Imran Khan 2/17 (4 overs) |

Peshawar Panthers won by 6 runs
National Stadium, Karachi
Umpires: Ahsan Raza and Riazuddin
Player of the match: Zohaib Khan (Peshawar Panthers)

- Sialkot Stallions, who chose to field

27 September 2014
18:30 (D/N)
Scorecard

| Lahore Lions; 179/7 (20 overs) | v | Multan Tigers; 170 (20 overs) |
| Kamran Akmal 77(43); Muhammed Irfan 3/22 (4 overs) | | Rizwan Haider 42(25); Muhammed Aftab 4/24 (4 overs) |

Lahore Lions won by 9 runs
National Stadium, Karachi
Umpires: Ahmed Shahab and Shozab Raza
Player of the match: Kamran Akmal (Lahore Lions)

- Lahore Lions, who chose to bat

==== Final ====
28 September 2014
19:00 (D/N)
Scorecard

| Lahore Lions; 133/9 (20 overs) | v | Peshawar Panthers; 134/3 (19.2 overs) |
| Imam-ul-Haq 52* (41); Taj Wali 3/30 (4 overs) | | Iftikhar Ahmed 50* (44); Mohammad Irfan 2/22 (4 overs) |

Peshawar Panthers won by 7 wickets
National Stadium, Karachi
Umpires: Ahsan Raza and Shozab Raza
Player of the match: Iftikhar Ahmed (Peshawar Panthers) and Taj Wali (Peshawar Panthers)

- Lahore Lions won the toss and elected to bat

== Statistics ==
Leading run scorers
| Runs | Player | Team | Matches |
|---|---|---|---|
| 214 | Asad Shafiq | Karachi Dolphins | 4 |
| 198 | Kamran Akmal | Lahore lions | 5 |
| 195 | Mukhtar Ahmad | Sialkot stallions | 5 |
| 189 | Imam-ul-haq | Lahore Lions | 5 |
| 182 | Shoab Maqsood | Multan tigers | 4 |

Leading wicket takers
| Wickets | Player | Team | Matches |
|---|---|---|---|
| 12 | Imran Khan | Pehshawer panthers | 6 |
| 10 | Taj Wali | Peshawer panthers | 6 |
| 10 | Bilawal Bhatti | Sialkot stallians | 5 |
| 9 | Imran Khan | Peshawer panthers | 6 |
| 8 | Muhammed Irfan | Multan tigers | 4 |
