= Irfan Talib =

Pakistani cricketer

Personal information
- Born: 26 January 1986 (age 40); Mirpur, Azad Kashmir, Pakistan
- Batting: Left-handed
- Bowling: Left-arm orthodox spin
- Role: All-rounder

Domestic team information
- Years: Team
- 2010: Islamabad Leopards
- 2013: Rawalpindi Rams
- 2014-2015: AJK Jaguars

Career statistics
Competition	List A	Twenty20
Matches	5	7
Runs scored	103	93
Batting average	34.33	15.50
100s/50s	0/1	0/0
Top score	65*	33
Balls bowled	183	120
Wickets	6	10
Bowling average	22.66	12.70
5 wickets in innings	0	0
10 wickets in match	0	0
Best bowling	4/37	3/29
Catches/stumpings	0/–	0/–
- Source: ESPNcricinfo, 14 June 2022

Irfan Talib (Urdu: عرفان طالب) (born 26 January 1986), is a Pakistani cricketer. He was born at Mirpur, Azad Kashmir.

== Domestic career ==
=== List A career ===
Talib made his List A debut for Islamabad Leopards against Abbottabad Rhinos in the 2009/10 Royal Bank of Scotland Cup. Talib didn't bowl and scored 65* (117). Islamabad won the match by 4 wickets. He played his next match against Faisalabad Wolves. Talib scored 7 (22) and got figures of 1/22. Faisalabad won by 5 wickets. He played against Sialkot Stallions. He scored 21 (38) and got figures of 1/18. Sialkot won the match by 3 wickets. He played his last match of the tournament against Lahore Lions. He got figures of 4/37 and scored 10 (23) as Lahore went on to win by 30 runs. Talib played for Rawalpindi Rams against Abbottabad Falcons in the 2012–13 National One Day Cup. He got figures of 0/49 and didn't bat as Rawalpindi won the match by 5 wickets.

=== T20 career ===
Talib made his T20 debut for AJK Jaguars against Islamabad Leopards. He got figures of 0/18 and scored 15 (22) as Islamabad won by 34 runs. Talib played his next match against Faisalabad Wolves. He didn't bat and got figures of 2/21 as Faisalabad won by 8 wickets. Talib played his next match against Peshawar Panthers. He scored 4 (10) and got figures of 0/3 as Peshawar won the match by 9 wickets. Talib played his final match of the tournament against Lahore Eagles. He scored 18 (23) and got figures of 3/29 as Lahore won by 7 wickets. Talib played for AJK Jaguars in the 2015–16 National T20 Cup. He played his first match against Lahore Blues. He scored 22 (21) and got figures of 1/21 as Lahore won by 82 runs. Talib played his next match against Larkana Bulls. He got a score of 1 (2) and got figures of 2/8 as AJK Jaguars won by 58 runs. He played his last match of the tournament against Quetta Bears. He scored 33 (27) and got figures of 2/27 as Quetta won by 4 wickets.
