= Ghulam Murtaza (Kashmiri cricketer) =

Pakistani cricketer (born 1990)

Ghulam Murtaza غلام مرتضیٰ
Personal information
- Full name: Ghulam Murtaza
- Born: 15 December 1990 (age 35); Azad Kashmir, Pakistan
- Batting: Right-handed
- Bowling: Left-arm unorthodox spin
- Role: Batsman

Domestic team information
- Years: Team
- 2014/15: AJK Jaguars

Career statistics
Competition	T20
Matches	4
Runs scored	38
Batting average	12.66
100s/50s	0/0
Top score	24*
Balls bowled	–
Wickets	–
Bowling average	–
5 wickets in innings	–
10 wickets in match	–
Best bowling	–
Catches/stumpings	1/–
- Source: ESPNcricinfo, 4 July 2022

Ghulam Murtaza (Urdu: غلام مرتضیٰ) (born 15 December 1990 in Azad Kashmir), is a Pakistani cricketer.

== Domestic career ==
Murtaza made his debut for AJK Jaguars against the Islamabad Leopards in the 2014–15 National T20 Cup. Murtaza scored 11 (8). Islamabad won the match by 34 runs. Murtaza played his next match against the Faisalabad Wolves. He scored 24* (15). Faisalabad won by 8 wickets. Murtaza played his next match against the Peshawar Panthers. He scored 2 (7). Peshawar won the match by 9 wickets. Murtaza played his last match of the tournament against the Lahore Eagles. He scored 1 (4). Lahore won by 7 wickets.
