= 2010–11 National T20 Cup =

Cricket tournament

- Faysal Bank Twenty-20 Cup
- Dates: 10 – 16 October 2010
- Administrator(s): Pakistan Cricket Board
- Cricket format: Twenty20
- Tournament format(s): Round-robin and knockout
- Host(s): Lahore, Pakistan
- Champions: Lahore Lions (1st title)
- Participants: 13
- Matches: 18
- Most runs: Shahzaib Hasan (281)
- Most wickets: Wahab Riaz (14)

The 2010–11 Faysal Bank T20 Cup was the seventh season of the National T20 Cup in Pakistan, sponsored by Faysal Bank. This was one of the most closely fought tournaments in Pakistani Twenty20 cricket as the previous five tournaments had ended in victory for the Sialkot Stallions, this one saw the Stallions drop out in the first round. The Karachi Dolphins led by Shahid Afridi and Lahore Lions captained by Mohammad Yousuf competed in the final, which the Lahore Lions won by 37 runs. Abdul Razzaq was named man of the match for his valiant 71* of just 29 balls.

The tournament was held from 10 to 16 October 2010 at Gaddafi Stadium, Lahore. 13 teams were divided into four groups. The topper from each group qualified for the semi-finals. First semi-final was played between Islamabad Leopards and Lahore Lions while Karachi Dolphins and Rawalpindi Rams faced each other in the second semi-final. A total of 18 matches were played during the tournament, including the final.

The Pakistan Cricket Board hoped that the success in the tournament would mean the return of international cricket to Pakistan. Safety measures in the tournament were conducted in an excellent fashion. No security breaches were recorded. The safety report will be submitted to the ICC. Mohammad Yousuf was named as fielder for the series. International wicket-keeper Adnan Akmal was named keeper of the series for his good batting and tidy keeping.

Despite the success of the tournament, the Pakistan Cricket Board announced that a match between the Karachi Dolphins and Rawalpindi Rams (semi-final) was being investigated amid allegations of match-fixing. The board announced that another match was also under investigation.

== Results ==
=== Teams and standings ===
The top team from each group qualified for the semi-finals. The top two teams of each group also qualified for the 2011 Faysal Bank Super Eight T20 Cup.

Group A
| Team | Pld | W | L | T | NR | Pts | NRR |
|---|---|---|---|---|---|---|---|
| Lahore Lions | 3 | 3 | 0 | 0 | 0 | 6 | +1.492 |
| Multan Tigers | 3 | 2 | 1 | 0 | 0 | 4 | −0.107 |
| Abbottabad Rhinos | 3 | 1 | 2 | 0 | 0 | 2 | −0.030 |
| Peshawar Panthers | 3 | 0 | 3 | 0 | 0 | 0 | −1.302 |

Group B
| Team | Pld | W | L | T | NR | Pts | NRR |
|---|---|---|---|---|---|---|---|
| Rawalpindi Rams | 2 | 2 | 0 | 0 | 0 | 4 | +1.025 |
| Sialkot Stallions | 2 | 1 | 1 | 0 | 0 | 2 | +1.294 |
| Karachi Zebras | 2 | 0 | 2 | 0 | 0 | 0 | −2.252 |

Group C
| Team | Pld | W | L | T | NR | Pts | NRR |
|---|---|---|---|---|---|---|---|
| Islamabad Leopards | 2 | 2 | 0 | 0 | 0 | 4 | +0.645 |
| Faisalabad Wolves | 2 | 1 | 1 | 0 | 0 | 2 | +0.807 |
| Quetta Bears | 2 | 0 | 2 | 0 | 0 | 0 | −1.375 |

Group D
| Team | Pld | W | L | T | NR | Pts | NRR |
|---|---|---|---|---|---|---|---|
| Karachi Dolphins | 2 | 2 | 0 | 0 | 0 | 4 | +1.375 |
| Hyderabad Hawks | 2 | 1 | 1 | 0 | 0 | 2 | −0.350 |
| Lahore Eagles | 2 | 0 | 2 | 0 | 0 | 0 | −1.039 |

Qualified for semifinals
Full table on ESPNCricinfo

=== Knockout stage ===
Semifinals
A1 | Lahore Lions | 134/4
C1 | Islamabad Leopards | 132/8
B1 | Rawalpindi Rams | 209/6
D1 | Karachi Dolphins | 210/5

Finals
A1 | Lahore Lions | 221/3
D1 | Karachi Dolphins | 184

== Knockout stage ==
Semi-finals

15 October 2010
15:00 (D/N)

| Islamabad Leopards; 132/8 (20 overs) | v | Lahore Lions; 134/4 (16.2 overs) |
| Fayyaz Ahmed 53 (50); Wahab Riaz 3/26 (4 overs) | | Mohammad Yousuf 57* (48); Azhar Mahmood 4/32 (4 overs) |

Lahore Lions won by 6 wickets
Gaddafi Stadium, Lahore
Umpires: Asad Rauf and Riazuddin
Player of the match: Mohammad Yousuf (Lahore Lions)

- Islamabad Leopards won the toss and chose to bat.

15 October 2010
19:00 (D/N)

| Rawalpindi Rams; 209/6 (20 overs) | v | Karachi Dolphins; 210/5 (18.5 overs) |
| Babar Naeem 62 (38); Sohail Khan 3/27 (4 overs) | | Shahzaib Hasan 71* (51); Babar Naeem 1/29 (2 overs) |

Karachi Dolphins won by 5 wickets
Gaddafi Stadium, Lahore
Umpires: Akram Raza and Zameer Haider
Player of the match: Shahzaib Hasan (Karachi Dolphins)

- Rawalpindi Rams won the toss and elected to bat.

Final

16 October 2010
19:00 (D/N)

| Lahore Lions; 221/3 (20 overs) | v | Karachi Dolphins; 184 (19.4 overs) |
| Abdul Razzaq 71* (29); Shahid Afridi 1/36 (4 overs) | | Shahid Afridi 48 (29); Wahab Riaz 3/14 (3.4 overs) |

Lahore Lions won by 37 runs
Gaddafi Stadium, Lahore
Umpires: Asad Rauf and Nadeem Ghauri
Player of the match: Abdul Razzaq (Lahore Lions)

- Lahore Lions won the toss and elected to bat.

== Statistics ==
=== Most runs ===
| Player | Team | Mat | Inns | Runs | SR | Ave | HS | 100 | 50 | 0 | 4s | 6s |
|---|---|---|---|---|---|---|---|---|---|---|---|---|
| Shahzaib Hasan | Karachi Dolphins | 4 | 4 | 281 | 169.27 | 140.50 | 101* | 1 | 2 | 0 | 32 | 10 |
| Ahmed Shehzad | Lahore Lions | 5 | 5 | 191 | 148.06 | 38.20 | 69 | 0 | 1 | 1 | 25 | 6 |
| Nasir Jamshed | Lahore Lions | 5 | 5 | 183 | 115.82 | 45.75 | 70 | 0 | 2 | 0 | 16 | 7 |
| Shahid Afridi | Karachi Dolphins | 4 | 4 | 156 | 216.66 | 39.00 | 63 | 0 | 0 | 0 | 11 | 12 |
| Abdul Razzaq | Lahore Lions | 5 | 4 | 138 | 215.62 | 69.00 | 71* | 0 | 2 | 0 | 10 | 10 |

=== Most wickets ===
| Player | Team | Mat | Ov | Wkts | Econ | Ave | SR | BBI |
|---|---|---|---|---|---|---|---|---|
| Wahab Riaz | Lahore Lions | 7 | 26.0 | 14 | 7.03 | 13.07 | 11.1 | 4/18 |
| Hammad Azam | Rawalpindi Rams | 4 | 16.0 | 11 | 6.50 | 9.45 | 8.7 | 4/19 |
| Shabbir Ahmed | Lahore Lions | 7 | 23.0 | 11 | 7.08 | 14.81 | 12.5 | 3/20 |
| Abdul Raazzaq | Lahore Lions | 6 | 22.2 | 11 | 7.56 | 15.36 | 12.1 | 4/26 |
| Aizaz Cheema | Lahore Lions | 7 | 22.0 | 10 | 6.54 | 14.40 | 13.2 | 3/24 |
| Shoaib Akhtar | Islamabad Leopards | 7 | 22.0 | 10 | 6.54 | 14.40 | 13.2 | 3/24 |

== Media coverage ==
- GEO Super (live) – Pakistan
