= Arun Lal (Pakistani cricketer) =

Pakistani cricketer

Personal information
- Full name: Arun Lal
- Born: 26 August 1985 (age 41); Quetta, Balochistan, Pakistan
- Batting: Right-handed
- Bowling: Right-arm medium-fast

Domestic team information
- Years: Team
- 2001/02–2014/15: Quetta
- 2004/05–2015/16: Quetta Bears

Career statistics
Competition	First-class	List A	Twenty20
Matches	79	27	33
Runs scored	2,216	246	289
Batting average	17.17	10.25	13.13
100s/50s	0/10	0/0	0/0
Top score	98	35*	32
Balls bowled	12,149	1,046	510
Wickets	200	27	17
Bowling average	33.95	36.14	40.94
5 wickets in innings	8	0	0
10 wickets in match	1	0	0
Best bowling	7/87	3/23	2/8
Catches/stumpings	37/–	1/–	13/–
- Source: Cricinfo, 13 April 2026

Arun Lal (born 26 August 1985) is a Pakistani former cricketer. Lal is a right-handed batsman who bowls right-arm medium-fast. He was born in Quetta, Balochistan.

Lal made his first-class debut in the 2001/02 Pakistani domestic season. He made his List A debut for Quetta Bears against Multan Tigers in the ABN-AMRO Cup in January 2005, and made his Twenty20 debut for the side against Rawalpindi Rams in the ABN-AMRO Twenty-20 Cup in April 2005. He also played for Quetta Bears, Pakistan Navy, Quetta Region, Quetta Under-19s, North West Frontier Province and Baluchistan, Baluchistan, Quetta, Dewan Farooq Motor Limited, Rest of Baluchistan and United Bank Limited.

In January 2007, Lal made 92 against Lahore Ravi in the Quaid-e-Azam Trophy after Quetta had fallen to 56 for 5 in their first innings. The following month, he scored 52 and shared a 97-run fifth-wicket partnership with Shoaib Khan against Hyderabad. In December 2009, he made a career-best 98 in Quetta's second innings against Karachi Blues, adding 224 for the sixth wicket with Shoaib Khan to help save the match.

Lal's most notable bowling performance came against Multan in the 2011–12 Quaid-e-Azam Trophy Division Two, when he took match figures of 11 for 94, including 6 for 36 in the second innings, as Quetta won by an innings and 80 runs. Late in his career, he made an unbeaten 73 for Quetta Bears against Karachi Zebras in the 2014–15 Quaid-e-Azam Trophy Silver League. He continued to represent Quetta in Twenty20 cricket until 2015.

During his career, Lal played 79 first-class matches and took 200 wickets at a bowling average of 33.95, with best figures of 7/87, while taking 8 five-wicket hauls and 1 10-wicket match haul.
