= Zafar Ali =

Zafar Ali may refer to:

- Zafar Ali (Indian cricketer) (born 1987)
- Zafar Ali (Pakistani cricketer) (born 1986)
- Zafar Ali (politician), Bangladeshi politician
