= Irfan Ismail (cricketer, born 1992) =

Pakistani cricketer (born 1992)

Personal information
- Full name: Mohammad Irfan Ismail
- Born: 14 February 1992 (age 34); Quetta, Balochistan, Pakistan
- Batting: Left-handed
- Bowling: Slow left-arm orthodox

Domestic team information
- Years: Team
- 2009: Quetta
- 2009: Quetta Bears

Career statistics
Competition	FC	LA	T20
Matches	1	5	2
Runs scored	5	30	19
Batting average	2.50	7.50	19.00
100s/50s	0/0	0/0	0/0
Top score	5	17	15*
Balls bowled	84	287	42
Wickets	0	7	1
Bowling average	–	38.42	87.00
5 wickets in innings	–	0	0
10 wickets in match	–	0	0
Best bowling	–	3/57	1/34
Catches/stumpings	1/–	3/–	0/–
- Source: CricketArchive, 15 December 2014

Mohammad Irfan Ismail (born 14 February 1992) is a Pakistani cricketer who has played limited overs and Twenty20 matches for the Quetta Bears and a single first-class match for Quetta.

From Quetta, a city in Balochistan, Irfan debuted for Quetta District in under-19 inter-district matches in mid-2007, at the age of 15. He made his first-class debut for Quetta in February 2009, five days after his seventeenth birthday, playing against Hyderabad in the Quaid-i-Azam Trophy. A left-arm orthodox spinner and left-handed lower-order batsman, he failed to take a wicket from 14 overs on debut. While batting, he scored five runs in the first innings and recorded a golden duck in the second.

Irfan made his limited-overs debut the following month, playing five matches for the Quetta Bears in the Royal Bank of Scotland Cup. Despite his young age, he served as the side's captain, with wicket-keeper Bismillah Khan as his vice-captain. Irfan took seven wickets during the tournament, with his best figures 3/57 from ten overs against the Abbottabad Rhinos. In a later match, against the Karachi Dolphins, he made his highest score, 17 runs from 22 balls. The Dolphins had earlier scored 364/2 from their 50 overs, with Irfan's opposing captain, Khalid Latif, making 204 not out, a rare one-day double century.

Later in the 2008–09 season, Irfan played two Twenty20 matches for the Quetta Bears franchise in the RBS Twenty-20 Cup, against the Faisalabad Wolves and the Lahore Lions. He took only a single wicket during the tournament. Mohammad Irfan Ismail (born 1988), another left-arm orthodox-spinner, also made a first-class appearance for Quetta during the 2008–09 season. To avoid confusion, Irfan Ismail (born 1988) is sometimes referred to as "Irfan Ismail, Sr.", while Irfan Ismail (born 1992), the subject of this article, is sometimes referred to as "Irfan Ismail, Jr.".
