= 2016–17 National T20 Cup =

Cricket tournament

2016–17 Cool & Cool Present Jazz National T20 Cup
- Dates: 25 August – 16 September 2016
- Administrator: Pakistan Cricket Board
- Cricket format: Twenty20
- Tournament format(s): Round-robin and Final
- Host: Pakistan
- Champions: Karachi Blues (1st title)
- Participants: 8
- Matches: 31
- Most runs: Umar Akmal (363)
- Most wickets: Saeed Ajmal (20)
- Official website: www.pcb.com.pk

The 2016–17 Jazz National T20 Cup was a Twenty20 domestic cricket competition held in Multan, Pakistan. It took place from 25 August to 16 September 2016, with eight teams competing instead of 18 as in previous years. It was the 13th season of the National Twenty20 Cup in Pakistan.

Karachi Blues won the tournament, defeating Karachi Whites by 3 runs in the final. However, they were not invited to defend their title the following year, drawing criticism from cricketing fans on social media.

== Squads ==
The following players were selected:

Karachi Blues	FATA	Islamabad	Karachi Whites	Lahore Blues	Lahore Whites	Peshawar	Rawalpindi
Khalid Latif (c); Ali Khan; Bilawal Bhatti; Fawad Alam; Khurram Manzoor; Mohammad Sami; Mohammad Asghar; Fazal Subhan; Mohammad Waqas; Rumman Raees; Saifullah Bangash; Saeed Ajmal; Usama Mir; Zohaib Shera; Shahzaib Hasan	Fawad Khan (c); Aamer Yamin; Adnan Raees; Asif Afridi; Asif Ali; Bilal Asif; Irfanullah Shah; Khushdil Shah; Mohammad Imran; Mohammad Irfan; Usman Khan; Sameen Gul; Yasir Hameed; Sohrab Khan; Umar Siddiq	Umar Gul (c); Abid Ali; Abdur Rehman; Ali Sarfraz; Adil Amin; Imad Wasim; Junaid Khan; Imam-ul-Haq; Raheel Majeed; Naeem Anjum; Shahid Afridi; Shehzad Azam; Zohaib Ahmed; Sami Aslam; Sarmad Bhatti	Akbar-ur-Rehman (c); Ahsan Ali; Asif Zakir; Azam Hussain; Danish Aziz; Faraz Ahmed; Mir Hamza; Misbah-ul-Haq; Mohammad Hasan; Sohail Khan; Saud Shakeel; Rameez Raja; Tariq Haroon; Tabish Khan; Zain Abbas	Ahmed Shehzad (c); Asif Raza; Ahmed Bashir; Agha Salman; Faheem Ashraf; Farhan Khan; Hasan Ali; Nauman Anwar; Nasir Jamshed; Muhammad Akhlaq; Rahat Ali; Saad Nasim; Zafar Gohar; Naved Yasin; Raza Ali Dar	Kamran Akmal (c); Amad Butt; Ehsan Adil; Imran Butt; Hussain Talat; Ayaz Tasawwar; Arsal Sheikh; Imran Khan; Kashif Bhatti; Kamran Ghulam; Salman Butt; Umar Akmal; Zia-ul-Haq; Shahid Yousuf; Qaiser Ashraf	Rafatullah Mohmand (c); Akbar Badshah; Fakhar Zaman; Anwar Ali; Gauhar Ali; Ghulam Mudassar; Imran Khalid; Imran Khan; Israrullah; Sohaib Maqsood; Waqas Maqsood; Shah Faisal; Zohaib Khan; Musadiq Ahmed; Iftikhar Ahmed	Sohail Tanvir (c); Aizaz Cheema; Asif Ali; Awais Zia; Jamal Anwar; Hammad Azam; Mukhtar Ahmed; Mohammad Nawaz; Umar Amin; Yasir Arafat; Naved Malik; Zeeshan Malik; Zulfiqar Babar; Zahid Mansoor; Shadab Khan

== Points table ==
Team	Pld	W	L	NR	NRR	Pts
Peshawar	7	5	2	0	+0.905	10
Lahore Whites	7	5	2	0	+0.700	10
Karachi Whites	7	5	2	0	+0.580	10
Karachi Blues	7	4	3	0	−0.236	8
Islamabad	7	3	4	0	−0.505	6
Rawalpindi	7	2	5	0	−0.248	4
Federally Administered Tribal Areas	7	2	5	0	−0.472	2
Lahore Blues	7	2	5	0	−0.649	2

Team qualified for the Semi-finals

== Fixtures ==
=== Round-robin ===
25 August 2016
Scorecard

Karachi Blues; 158/8 (20 overs)	v	Karachi Whites; 149/8 (20 overs)
Shahzaib Hasan 60 (50); Azam Hussain 2/23 (4 overs)		Tariq Haroon 28 (13); Mohammad Sami 3/29 (4 overs)

Karachi Blues won by 9 runs
Rawalpindi Cricket Stadium
Umpires: Ahsan Raza and Rashid Riaz
Player of the match: Shahzaib Hasan (Karachi Blues)

- Karachi Blues won the toss and elected to bat.

25 August 2016
Scorecard

Lahore Blues; 182/5 (20 overs)	v	Lahore Whites; 185/1 (16.3 overs)
Naved Yasin 53 (40); Amad Butt 3/34 (4 overs)		Salman Butt 84* (55); Imran Ali 1/34 (3 overs)

Lahore Whites won by 9 wickets
Rawalpindi Cricket Stadium
Umpires: Khalid Mahmood and Riazuddin
Player of the match: Kamran Akmal (Lahore Whites)

- Lahore Whites won the toss and elected to field.
- Farhan Khan (Lahore Blues) made his T20 debut.

26 August 2016
Scorecard

FATA; 162/5 (20 overs)	v	Rawalpindi; 147/9 (20 overs)
Fawad Khan 94 (51); Zulfiqar Babar 2/22 (4 overs)		Zahid Mansoor 30 (25); Asif Ali 4/20 (4 overs)

Federally Administered Tribal Areas won by 15 runs
Rawalpindi Cricket Stadium
Umpires: Imtiaz Iqbal and Rashid Riaz
Player of the match: Fawad Khan (Federally Administered Tribal Areas)

- Federally Administered Tribal Areas won the toss and elected to bat.
- Irfanullah Shah, Mohammad Imran, Mohammad Usman (Federally Administered Tribal Areas) and Shadab Khan (Rawalpindi) all made their T20 debuts.

26 August 2016
Scorecard

Karachi Whites; 152/5 (20 overs)	v	Peshawar; 154/7 (19.4 overs)
Akbar-ur-Rehman 48 (27); Imran Khan 2/19 (4 overs)		Rafatullah Mohmand 49 (30); Mir Hamza 2/34 (4 overs)

Peshawar won by 3 wickets
Rawalpindi Cricket Stadium
Umpires: Ahsan Raza and Shozab Raza
Player of the match: Rafatullah Mohmand (Peshawar)

- Karachi Whites won the toss and elected to bat.

26 August 2016
Scorecard

Islamabad; 138/7 (20 overs)	v	Lahore Whites; 142/1 (18.1 overs)
Ali Sarfraz 34 (21); Kashif Bhatti 2/20 (4 overs)		Kamran Akmal 91 (52); Shehzad Azam 1/34 (2 overs)

Lahore Whites won by 9 wickets
Rawalpindi Cricket Stadium
Umpires: Imtiaz Iqbal and Riazuddin

- Lahore Whites won the toss and elected to field

29 August 2016
Scorecard

Peshawar; 176/4 (20 overs)	v	Islamabad; 140/5 (20 overs)
Rafatullah Mohmand 66 (51); Junaid Khan 2/39 (4 overs)		Imam-ul-Haq 34* (30); Imran Khalid 2/22 (4 overs); Imran Khan 2/22 (4 overs)

Peshawar won by 36 runs
Rawalpindi Cricket Stadium
Umpires: Khalid Mahmood and Riazuddin
Player of the match: Sohaib Maqsood (Peshawar)

- Islamabad won the toss and elected to field.

29 August 2016
Scorecard

FATA; 139/7 (20 overs)	v	Lahore Blues; 143/4 (18.5 overs)
Fawad Khan 38 (30); Zafar Gohar 2/22 (4 overs)		Saad Nasim 66* (39); Asif Ali 1/18 (4 overs)

Lahore Blues won by 6 wickets
Rawalpindi Cricket Stadium
Umpires: Ahsan Raza and Asif Yaqoob
Player of the match: Saad Nasim (Lahore Blues)

- Lahore Blues won the toss and elected to field.
- Ahmed Bashir (Lahore Blues) made his T20 debut.

29 August 2016
Scorecard

Rawalpindi; 144/7 (20 overs)	v	Karachi Blues; 122/7 (20 overs)
Awais Zia 45 (31); Mohammad Asghar 2/19 (4 overs)		Khurram Manzoor 30 (40); Aizaz Cheema 3/22 (3 overs)

Rawalpindi won by 22 runs
Rawalpindi Cricket Stadium
Umpires: Ahmed Shahab and Ghaffar Kazmi
Player of the match: Awais Zia (Rawalpindi)

- Rawalpindi won the toss and elected to bat.

31 August 2016
Scorecard

Lahore Whites; 178/4 (20 overs)	v	Karachi Whites; 179/3 (18 overs)
Umar Akmal 81 (44); Sohail Khan 2/30 (4 overs)		Akbar-ur-Rehman 65* (38); Ehsan Adil 1/29 (3 overs)

Karachi Whites won by 7 wickets
Rawalpindi Cricket Stadium
Umpires: Asif Yaqoob and Saqib Khan
Player of the match: Akbar-ur-Rehman (Karachi Whites)

- Karachi Whites won the toss and elected to field.
- Arsal Sheikh (Lahore Whites) made his T20 debut.

31 August 2016
Scorecard

Karachi Blues; 174/7 (20 overs)	v	Lahore Blues; 123 (19.1 overs)
Shahzaib Hasan 52 (37); Saad Nasim 2/11 (2 overs)		Nauman Anwar 31 (20); Saeed Ajmal 4/27 (4 overs)

Karachi Blues won by 51 runs
Rawalpindi Cricket Stadium
Umpires: Ahsan Raza and Mohammad Sajid
Player of the match: Saeed Ajmal (Karachi Blues)

- Karachi Blues won the toss and elected to bat.

1 September 2016
Scorecard

FATA; 114/7 (20 overs)	v	Peshawar; 120/3 (13 overs)
Yasir Hameed 35 (34); Anwar Ali 3/23 (4 overs)		Israrullah 50 (29); Bilal Asif 1/28 (4 overs)

Peshawar won by 7 wickets
Rawalpindi Cricket Stadium
Umpires: Ahmed Shahab and Saqib Khan
Player of the match: Anwar Ali (Peshawar)

- Peshawar won the toss and elected to field.

1 September 2016
Scorecard

Islamabad; 174/5 (20 overs)	v	Rawalpindi; 175/5 (19 overs)
Imam-ul-Haq 54 (45); Zulfiqar Babar 2/17 (4 overs)		Umar Amin 76* (50); Mohammad Irfan 3/35 (4 overs)

Rawalpindi won by 5 wickets
Rawalpindi Cricket Stadium
Umpires: Mohammad Sajid and Shozab Raza
Player of the match: Umar Amin (Rawalpindi)

- Rawalpindi won the toss and elected to field.
- Umar Kiyani (Islamabad) made his T20 debut.

2 September 2016
Scorecard

Lahore Blues; 137/7 (20 overs)	v	Peshawar; 139/4 (18.2 overs)
Agha Salman 32* (27); Anwar Ali 3/28 (4 overs)		Rafatullah Mohmand 45* (38); Zafar Gohar 2/24 (4 overs)

Peshawar won by 6 wickets
Rawalpindi Cricket Stadium
Umpires: Asif Yaqoob and Mohammad Sajid
Player of the match: Zohaib Khan (Peshawar)

- Lahore Blues won the toss and elected to bat.

2 September 2016
Scorecard

Karachi Whites; 182/2 (20 overs)	v	Islamabad; 138/8 (20 overs)
Ahsan Ali 85 (52); Abdur Rehman 1/37 (4 overs)		Shehzad Azam 44* (35); Tabish Khan 2/20 (4 overs)

Karachi Whites won by 44 runs
Rawalpindi Cricket Stadium
Umpires: Qaiser Waheed and Zameer Haider
Player of the match: Ahsan Ali (Karachi Whites)

- Islamabad won the toss and elected to field.

5 September 2016
Scorecard

Lahore Whites; 175/2 (20 overs)	v	Rawalpindi; 156/7 (20 overs)
Umar Akmal 115* (48); Shadab Khan 1/29 (4 overs)		Hammad Azam 52* (32); Kashif Bhatti 3/15 (4 overs)

Lahore Whites won by 19 runs
Multan Cricket Stadium
Umpires: Ahmed Shahab and Riazuddin
Player of the match: Umar Akmal (Lahore Whites)

- Rawalpindi won the toss and elected to field.

5 September 2016
Scorecard

Karachi Blues; 151/7 (20 overs)	v	FATA; 134/7 (20 overs)
Shahzaib Hasan 51 (48); Aamer Yamin 3/31 (4 overs)		Mohammad Imran 34* (20); Saeed Ajmal 2/14 (4 overs)

Karachi Blues won by 17 runs
Multan Cricket Stadium
Umpires: Mohammad Sajid and Rashid Riaz
Player of the match: Shahzaib Hasan (Karachi Blues)

- Karachi Blues won the toss and elected to bat.

6 September 2016
Scorecard

Lahore Whites; 154/4 (20 overs)	v	Karachi Blues; 81 (17.3 overs)
Umar Akmal 75 (42); Rumman Raees 2/28 (4 overs)		Saifullah Bangash 19 (19); Kashif Bhatti 4/14 (3.3 overs)

Lahore Whites won by 73 runs
Multan Cricket Stadium
Umpires: Ahsan Raza and Rashid Riaz
Player of the match: Umar Akmal (Lahore Whites)

- Lahore Whites won the toss and elected to bat.
- Zohaib Shera (Karachi Blues) made his T20 debut.

6 September 2016
Scorecard

Lahore Blues; 142/8 (20 overs)	v	Karachi Whites; 143/7 (19.4 overs)
Asif Raza 44 (34); Faraz Ahmed 3/22 (4 overs)		Mohammad Hasan 41* (21); Ahmed Bashir 2/18 (2 overs)

Karachi Whites won by 3 wickets
Multan Cricket Stadium
Umpires: Asif Yaqoob and Saqib Khan
Player of the match: Mohammad Hasan (Karachi Whites)

- Lahore Blues won the toss and elected to bat.
- Danish Aziz (Karachi Whites) made his T20 debut.

7 September 2016
Scorecard

FATA; 139/4 (20 overs)	v	Islamabad; 140/3 (19 overs)
Umar Siddiq 51 (47); Junaid Khan 1/16 (4 overs)		Sami Aslam 61* (50); Mohammad Irfan 2/19 (3 overs)

Islamabad won by 7 wickets
Multan Cricket Stadium
Umpires: Ahsan Raza and Zameer Haider
Player of the match: Sami Aslam (Islamabad)

- Federally Administered Tribal Areas won the toss and elected to bat.

7 September 2016
Scorecard

Peshawar; 140 (20 overs)	v	Rawalpindi; 122/8 (20 overs)
Sohaib Maqsood 30 (21); Hammad Azam 2/22 (4 overs)		Umar Amin 52 (51); Imran Khan 3/23 (4 overs)

Peshawar won by 18 runs
Multan Cricket Stadium
Umpires: Ghaffar Kazmi and Riazuddin

- Peshawar won the toss and elected to bat.

8 September 2016
Scorecard

Karachi Whites; 140/5 (20 overs)	v	Rawalpindi; 134/9 (20 overs)
Danish Aziz 52* (36); Aizaz Cheema 2/22 (4 overs)		Umar Amin 50 (38); Tabish Khan 2/26 (4 overs)

Karachi Whites won by 6 runs
Multan Cricket Stadium
Umpires: Shozab Raza and Zameer Haider
Player of the match: Danish Aziz (Karachi Whites)

- Karachi Whites won the toss and elected to bat.
- Zeeshan Malik (Rawalpindi) made his T20 debut.

8 September 2016
Scorecard

Karachi Blues; 164/6 (20 overs)	v	Peshawar; 161/7 (20 overs)
Fazal Subhan 53 (34); Zohaib Khan 2/21 (4 overs)		Iftikhar Ahmed 65 (42); Saeed Ajmal 2/27 (4 overs)

Karachi Blues won by 3 runs
Multan Cricket Stadium
Umpires: Ahmed Shahab and Qaiser Waheed
Player of the match: Fazal Subhan (Karachi Blues)

- Karachi Blues won the toss and elected to bat.

9 September 2016
Scorecard

Lahore Blues; 119/6 (20 overs)	v	Islamabad; 123/5 (19.1 overs)
Naved Yasin 36 (32); Mohammad Abbas 2/18 (3 overs)		Abid Ali 46 (41); Raza Ali Dar 1/10 (2 overs)

Islamabad won by 5 wickets
Multan Cricket Stadium
Umpires: Ahsan Raza and Ghaffar Kazmi
Player of the match: Abid Ali (Islamabad)

- Lahore Blues won the toss and elected to bat.

9 September 2016
Scorecard

FATA; 117 (19.3 overs)	v	Lahore Whites; 83 (17.5 overs)
Umar Siddiq 24 (23); Qaiser Ashraf 2/21 (4 overs)		Kashif Bhatti 21* (17); Aamer Yamin 4/5 (4 overs)

Federally Administered Tribal Areas won by 34 runs
Multan Cricket Stadium
Umpires: Khalid Mahmood and Shozab Raza
Player of the match: Aamer Yamin (Federally Administered Tribal Areas)

- Federally Administered Tribal Areas won the toss and elected to bat.
- Sameen Gul (Federally Administered Tribal Areas) made his T20 debut.

10 September 2016
Scorecard

FATA; 124/8 (20 overs)	v	Karachi Whites; 127/5 (17.2 overs)
Bilal Asif 44 (46); Tabish Khan 3/29 (4 overs)		Asad Shafiq 62 (43); Sameen Gul 1/6 (1 over)

Karachi Whites won by 6 wickets
Multan Cricket Stadium
Umpires: Ghaffar Kazmi and Zameer Haider
Player of the match: Asad Shafiq (Karachi Whites)

- Federally Administered Tribal Areas won the toss and elected to bat.

10 September 2016
Scorecard

Lahore Whites; 159/3 (20 overs)	v	Peshawar; 153 (19.5 overs)
Salman Butt 61 (52); Imran Khalid 1/22 (4 overs)		Fakhar Zaman 62* (40); Zia-ul-Haq 3/26 (4 overs)

Lahore Whites won by 6 runs
Multan Cricket Stadium
Umpires: Asif Yaqoob and Khalid Mahmood
Player of the match: Umar Akmal (Lahore Whites)

- Lahore Whites won the toss and elected to bat.
- Ghulam Mudassar (Peshawar) made his T20 debut.

11 September 2016
Scorecard

Rawalpindi; 127/8 (20 overs)	v	Lahore Blues; 129/6 (19.2 overs)
Awais Zia 28 (27); Zafar Gohar 3/34 (4 overs)		Ahmed Shehzad 35 (23); Shadab Khan 2/15 (4 overs)

Lahore Blues won by 4 wickets
Multan Cricket Stadium
Umpires: Khalid Mahmood and Shozab Raza
Player of the match: Zafar Gohar (Lahore Blues)

- Lahore Blues won the toss and elected to field.

11 September 2016
Scorecard

Islamabad; 151/6 (20 overs)	v	Karachi Blues; 133 (19.2 overs)
Raheel Majeed 72* (49); Mohammad Asghar 2/17 (4 overs)		Shahzaib Hasan 66 (50); Adil Amin 3/31 (4 overs)

Islamabad won by 18 runs
Multan Cricket Stadium
Umpires: Imtiaz Iqbal and Qaiser Waheed
Player of the match: Raheel Majeed (Islamabad)

- Islamabad won the toss and elected to bat.

=== Knockout stage ===
==== Semi-finals ====
15 September 2016
Scorecard

Peshawar; 178/7 (20 overs)	v	Karachi Whites; 179/2 (18.2 overs)
Iftikhar Ahmed 78* (53); Faraz Ahmed 2/33 (4 overs)		Asad Shafiq 92* (55); Waqas Maqsood 1/29 (3 overs)

Karachi Whites won by 8 wickets
Multan Cricket Stadium
Umpires: Ahsan Raza and Khalid Mahmood
Player of the match: Asad Shafiq (Karachi Whites)

- Karachi Whites won the toss and elected to field.

15 September 2016
Scorecard

Lahore Whites; 127/6 (20 overs)	v	Karachi Blues; 133/1 (12 overs)
Salman Butt 55* (55); Saeed Ajmal 3/21 (4 overs)		Shahzaib Hasan 65* (35); Kashif Bhatti 1/38 (3 overs)

Karachi Blues won by 9 wickets
Multan Cricket Stadium
Umpires: Ahmed Shahab and Shozab Raza
Player of the match: Saeed Ajmal (Karachi Blues)

- Lahore Whites won the toss and elected to bat.

==== Final ====
16 September 2016
Scorecard

Karachi Blues; 182/3 (20 overs)	v	Karachi Whites; 179/8 (20 overs)
Khurram Manzoor 70 (42); Mir Hamza 1/30 (4 overs)		Zain Abbas 47 (39); Mohammad Nawaz 4/26 (4 overs)

Karachi Blues won by 3 runs
Multan Cricket Stadium
Umpires: Ahsan Raza and Shozab Raza
Player of the match: Mohammad Nawaz (Karachi Blues)

- Karachi Blues won the toss and elected to bat.
