= AJK Jaguars =

Cricket team in Pakistan

AJK Jaguars آزاد جموں و کشمیر زگوار
Team information
- Colours
- Founded: 2014
- Dissolved: 2016
- Home ground: Mirpur Cricket Stadium
- Capacity: 5000

History
- Haier T20 Cup wins: 0

The AJK Jaguars (Urdu: آزاد جموں و کشمیر زگوار) was a Pakistani men's professional Twenty20 cricket team that competed in the Haier T20 League and based in Mirpur, Azad Jammu and Kashmir, Pakistan. The Jaguars played at the Mirpur Cricket Stadium and was owned by the AJK Regional Cricket Association.

== History ==
The AJK Jaguars were formed in 2014–15 season to represent the region Azad Kashmir in the national tournament.

The 2014-15 tournament was a terrible tournament for them as they lost all four matches in their group coming last and therefore got eliminated from the tournament.

The 2015-16 tournament didn't go well either as they only won one match out of the three matches they played. They had the same number of points as Quetta Bears but had a worse net run rate so they came third and got eliminated once more. This would also be their last season.

== Fixtures and results ==
Results by opposition
	Played	Wins	Losses	No Result	% Win
Islamabad Leopards	0	0	0	0	00.00%
Faisalabad Wolves	0	0	0	0	00.00%
Peshawar Panthers	0	0	0	0	00.00%
Lahore Eagles	0	0	0	0	00.00%
Total	0	0	0	0	00.00%

== See also ==
- Abbottabad Falcons
- Peshawar Panthers
- Afghan Cheetahs
