= Khurshid Anwar (cricketer) =

Pakistani cricketer (born 1987)

Personal information
- Full name: Khurshid Anwar Afridi
- Born: 2 December 1987 (age 38); Kohat, North-West Frontier Province, Pakistan
- Batting: Right-handed
- Bowling: Legbreak
- Source: ESPNcricinfo, 19 February 2021

Khurshid Anwar (born 2 December 1987) is a Pakistani cricketer. In October 2010, he was named in the Abbottabad Falcons' squad for the 2010–11 National T20 Cup. He made his Twenty20 debut for the Abbottabad Falcons on 13 October 2010, against the Peshawar Panthers.
