= Irfan Ismail =

Irfan Ismail may refer to:

- Irfan Ismail (cricketer, born 1988), Pakistani cricketer
- Irfan Ismail (cricketer, born 1992), Pakistani cricketer
- Irfan Ismail (footballer), Singaporean footballer for Hougang United FC in the Prime League
