= Imran Khan (cricketer, born 1988) =

Pakistani cricketer

Personal information
- Born: 14 July 1988 (age 38); Swat, Khyber Pakhtunkhwa, Pakistan
- Batting: Left-handed
- Bowling: Left-arm medium-fast
- Role: Bowler

International information
- National side: Pakistan
- T20I debut (cap 64): 24 September 2015 v Zimbabwe
- Last T20I: 26 November 2015 v England

Domestic team information
- Years: Team
- 2014–2015: Peshawar Panthers
- 2016–2017: Peshawar Zalmi
- 2018: Lahore Qalandars

Career statistics
Competition	T20
Matches	9
Runs scored	16
Batting average	16.00
100s/50s	0/0
Top score	14
Balls bowled	203
Wickets	18
Bowling average	12.50
5 wickets in innings	0
10 wickets in match	0
Best bowling	4/25
Catches/stumpings	5/–
- Source: CricketArchive, 15 September 2020

Imran Khan (born 14 July 1988) is a Pakistani cricketer who made his Twenty20 debut for the Peshawar Panthers during the 2014–15 season of the Haier T20 Cup. He is a left-arm fast bowler, known for "bamboozl[ing] opposing batsmen" through his "repertoire of slower balls". He made his Twenty20 International debut against Zimbabwe on 27 September 2015.

Hailing from Swat District, Khyber Pakhtunkhwa, Imran played district cricket for Swat in the Peshawar division of the country-wide Inter-District Senior Tournament. Having been selected in the Peshawar Panthers' squad for the 2014–15 Haier T20 Cup, he went on to play seven matches in eight days in the tournament, held in September 2014. Imran finished with twelve wickets from six matches, the most for any player the tournament, at a bowling average of 12.91 and a strike rate of 10.91 balls per wicket. He was accordingly named the best bowler of the tournament. On debut against the Lahore Eagles, Imran took 4/25 from four overs, for which he was named man of the match. Other notable performances included 2/7 from 1.5 overs against the AJK Jaguars, 2/27 against the Faisalabad Wolves, and 2/26 against the Lahore Lions.

Another member of the Panthers tournament-winning team the similarly named Mohammad Imran Khan (born 1987), who later played Test cricket for the Pakistani national side. For this reason, Imran Khan (born 1987) is often recorded as "Mohammad Imran Khan" or "Imran Khan, Sr." on scorecards, while Imran Khan (born 1988), the subject of this article, is often recorded as "Imran Khan (Swat)" or "Imran Khan, Jr.".

He was the leading wicket-taker for Peshawar in the 2018–19 Quaid-e-Azam One Day Cup, with eleven dismissals in seven matches.
