= Asadullah Sumari =

Pakistani cricketer (born 1986)

Personal information
- Born: 22 June 1986 (age 40)
- Source: Cricinfo, 27 March 2021

Asadullah Sumari (born 22 June 1986) is a Pakistani cricketer. He played in seventeen first-class and twelve List A matches between 2007 and 2015. He made his Twenty20 debut on 9 February 2014, for Islamabad Leopards in the 2013–14 National T20 Cup.
