= National T20 Cup =

Men's professional domestic Twenty20 cricket competition in Pakistan

National T20 Cup جام قومی ٹی ۲۰
- Countries: Pakistan
- Administrator: Pakistan Cricket Board
- Format: Twenty20
- First edition: 2004–05
- Latest edition: 2025–26
- Next edition: 2026–27
- Number of teams: 18
- Current champion: Abbottabad (1st title)
- Most successful: Sialkot Stallions (6 titles)
- TV: List of Broadcasters
- Website: Official website
- 2025–26 National T20 Cup

The National T20 Cup is a men's professional domestic Twenty20 cricket competition in Pakistan. Established in 2005, it is one of the world's oldest Twenty20 cricket leagues. It was the principal T20 competition in the country until 2016, when the Pakistan Super League (PSL) franchise tournament was introduced. Since 2019–20, the National T20 Cup has been contested by six regional teams, having previously been contested mainly by teams representing the various city, district and area cricket associations.

The league's team offices are directed out of its head offices located at Gaddafi Stadium in Lahore. Abbottabad are the defending champions, having won the 2025-26 edition.

== History ==
The National T20 Cup began in the 2004–05 season, when it was called the ABN-AMRO Twenty-20 Cup for sponsorship reasons, and quickly became the premier professional Twenty20 cricket league in Pakistan with 14 teams. It was the first T20 cricket league in the world outside of Australia and England.

As ownership of the title sponsor changed, the competition was renamed to the RBS Twenty-20 Cup in 2008–09, and to the Faysal Bank Twenty-20 Cup in 2010–11. In the 2014–15 season, the league was renamed to the Haier T20 Cup.

Sialkot Stallions have been the most successful team, winning the title a total of six times.

== Format ==
The format of the competition and the number of teams competing have changed regularly with the restructuring of domestic cricket in Pakistan. It has always started with round-robin group stage and concluded with a knockout stage.

== Teams ==
=== Current Teams ===
Team name	Team captains
Abbottabad cricket team	Babar Azam
Azad Jammu & Kashmir cricket team	Naveed Malik
Bahawalpur cricket team	Mohammad Rizwan
Dera Murad Jamali cricket team	Mohammad Shahid
Faisalabad cricket team	Asif Ali
Federally Administered Tribal Areas cricket team	Khushdil Shah
Hyderabad cricket team (Pakistan)	Rizwan Mehmood
Islamabad cricket team	Haris Rauf
Karachi Blues	Saifullah Bangash
Karachi Whites	Ashir Qureshi
Lahore Blues	Hussain Talat
Lahore Whites	Saad Nasim
Larkana cricket team	Zahid Mehmood
Multan cricket team	Sharoon Siraj
Peshawar cricket team	Maaz Sadaqat
Quetta cricket team	Abdul Bangalzai
Rawalpindi cricket team	Shadab Khan
Sialkot cricket team	Mohammad Huraira

=== Former Teams ===
- Abbottabad Falcons
- Afghan Cheetahs
- AJK Jaguars
- Bahawalpur Stags
- Balochistan
- Central Punjab
- Dera Murad Jamali Ibexes
- Faisalabad Wolves
- FATA Cheetahs
- Hyderabad Hawks
- Islamabad Leopards
- Karachi Dolphins
- Karachi Zebras
- Khyber Pakhtunkhwa
- Lahore Eagles
- Lahore Lions
- Larkana Bulls
- Multan Tigers
- Northern
- Peshawar Panthers
- Quetta Bears
- Rawalpindi Rams
- Sialkot Stallions
- Sindh
- Southern Punjab

== Winners and competition details ==
=== National T20 Cup ===
Year	Final				Format	Teams
Year	Venue	Winners	Result	Runners-up	Format	Teams
2004–05; Details	Lahore	Faisalabad Wolves; 159 for 8 (19.5 overs)	Won by 2 wickets Scorecard	Karachi Dolphins; 158 for 7 (20 overs)	3-group round-robin, round-robin with top team from each, final	11
2005–06; Details	Karachi	Sialkot Stallions; 156 for 4 (19.2 overs)	Won by 6 wickets Scorecard	Faisalabad Wolves; 152 for 8 (20 overs)	2-group round-robin, semi-finals, final	13
2006–07; Details	Karachi	Sialkot Stallions; 151 all out (20 overs)	Won by 14 runs Scorecard	Karachi Dolphins; 137 for 7 (20 overs)	4-group round-robin, semi-finals, final	13
2008–09; Details	Lahore	Sialkot Stallions; 126 for 3 (19.4 overs)	Won by 7 wickets Scorecard	Karachi Dolphins; 125 for 9 (20 overs)	4-group round-robin, semi-finals, final	13
2009; Details	Lahore	Sialkot Stallions; 151 for 6 (19.1 overs)	Won by 4 wickets Scorecard	Lahore Lions; 150 for 8 (20 overs)	4-group round-robin, semi-finals, final	13
2009–10; Details	Karachi	Sialkot Stallions; 110 for 5 (16.3 overs)	Won by 5 wickets Scorecard	Faisalabad Wolves; 109 for 9 (20 overs)	4-group round-robin, semi-finals, final	13
2010–11; Details	Lahore	Lahore Lions; 221 for 3 (20 overs)	Won by 37 runs Scorecard	Karachi Dolphins; 184 all out (19.4 overs)	4-group round-robin, semi-finals, final	13
2011–12; Details	Karachi	Sialkot Stallions; 180 for 6 (20 overs)	Won by 10 runs Scorecard	Rawalpindi Rams; 170 for 8 (20 overs)	4-group round-robin, semi-finals, final	14
2012–13; Details	Lahore	Lahore Lions; 154 for 7 (20 overs)	Won by 33 runs Scorecard	Faisalabad Wolves; 121 for 8 (20 overs)	2-group round-robin, semi-finals, final	14
2013–14; Details	Rawalpindi	Lahore Lions; 131 for 7 (20 overs)	Won by 3 wickets Scorecard	Faisalabad Wolves; 130 for 9 (20 overs)	4-group round-robin, quarter-finals, semi-finals, final	17
2014–15; Details	Karachi	Peshawar Panthers; 134 for 3 (19.2 overs)	Won by 7 wickets Scorecard	Lahore Lions; 133 for 9 (20 overs)	4-group round-robin, quarter-finals, semi-finals, final	18
2015–16; Details	Rawalpindi	Peshawar Panthers; 178 for 3 (18.5 overs)	Won by 7 wickets Scorecard	Karachi Zebras; 177 for 8 (20 overs)	4-group round-robin, quarter-finals, semi-finals, final	18
2016–17; Details	Multan	Karachi Blues; 182 for 3 (20 overs)	Won by 3 runs Scorecard	Karachi Whites; 179 for 8 (20 overs)	round-robin, semi-finals, final	8
2017–18; Details	Rawalpindi	Lahore Blues; 131 for 3 (17.3 overs)	Won by 7 wickets Scorecard	Lahore Whites; 127 for 5 (20 overs)	round-robin, semi-finals, final	8
2018–19; Details	Multan	Lahore Whites; 165 for 8 (19.2 overs)	Won by 2 wickets Scorecard	Rawalpindi; 162 for 8 (20 overs)	round-robin, semi-finals, final	8
2019–20; Details	Faisalabad	Northern; 167 for 5 (20 overs)	Won by 52 runs Scorecard	Balochistan; 115 all out (18.2 overs)	round-robin, semi-finals, final	6
2020–21; Details	Rawalpindi	Khyber Pakhtunkhwa; 206 for 4 (20 overs)	Won by 10 runs Scorecard	Southern Punjab; 196 for 8 (20 overs)	double round-robin, semi-finals, final	6
2021–22; Details	Lahore	Khyber Pakhtunkhwa; 152 for 3 (17 overs)	Won by 7 wickets Scorecard	Central Punjab; 148 (20 overs)	double round-robin, semi-finals, final	6
2022–23; Details	Multan	Sindh; 141 for 2 (14.4 overs)	Won by 8 wickets Scorecard	Khyber Pakhtunkhwa; 140 (19.5 overs)	double round-robin, semi-finals, final	6
2023–24; Details	Karachi	Karachi Whites; 155 for 9 (20 overs)	Won by 9 runs Scorecard	Abbottabad; 146 for 9 (20 overs)	4-group round-robin, Super 8s, semi-finals, final	18
2024–25; Details	Faisalabad	Lahore Blues; 111 for 1 (16 overs)	Won by 9 wickets Scorecard	Peshawar; 110 for 9 (20 overs)	4-group round-robin, quarter-final, semi-finals, final	18
2025–26; Details	Lahore	Abbottabad; 120 for 1 (13.5 overs)	Won by 9 wickets Scorecard	Karachi Whites; 118 (18.3 overs)	2-group round-robin, semi-finals, final	10

=== National T20 Cup (Qualifier) ===
Year	Final				Format	Teams
Year	Venue	Winners	Result	Runners-up	Format	Teams
2025–26; Details	Lahore	Bahawalpur; 172/5 (20 overs)	Won by 59 runs Scorecard	Karachi Blues; 113 (16 overs)	2-group round-robin, with top team from each final	10

== See also ==
- Quaid-e-Azam Trophy
- Pakistan Cup
- Pakistan Super League
- Kashmir Premier League (Pakistan)
- Champions T20 Cup
- Champions One-Day Cup
- Champions Pentagular
- President's Cup (cricket)
