= Zoheb =

Zoheb is a given name. Notable people with the name include:

- Zoheb Hassan (born 1966), Pakistani singer, guitarist, producer, and director
- Zoheb Sharif (born 1983), English cricketer

== See also ==
- Zohaib
