= Khurshid Anwar =

Khurshid Anwar may refer to:

- Khurshid Anwar (Major), activist of All-India Muslim League
- Khurshid Anwar (cricketer) (born 1987), Pakistani cricketer for Abbottabad

== See also ==
- Khwaja Khurshid Anwar (1912–1984), filmmaker, writer, director and music composer
