= Karachi Dolphins =

Personnel
- Captain: Shahid Afridi
- Coach: Azam Khan

Team information
- Colours
- Founded: 2004
- Dissolved: 2016
- Home ground: National Stadium, Karachi
- Capacity: 34,228

The Karachi Dolphins were a limited overs cricket team based in Karachi which played in National One-day Championship and domestic Twenty20 in Pakistan. The Dolphins' home ground was National Stadium in Karachi's north end.

The Dolphins were considered one of the successful teams and had been runners-up on several occasions during the 2004/05, 2006/07, 2007/08, 2009/10, 2010/11, super 8 2011 and Super 8 2012 seasons.

== Squad ==
Players with international caps are listed in bold.

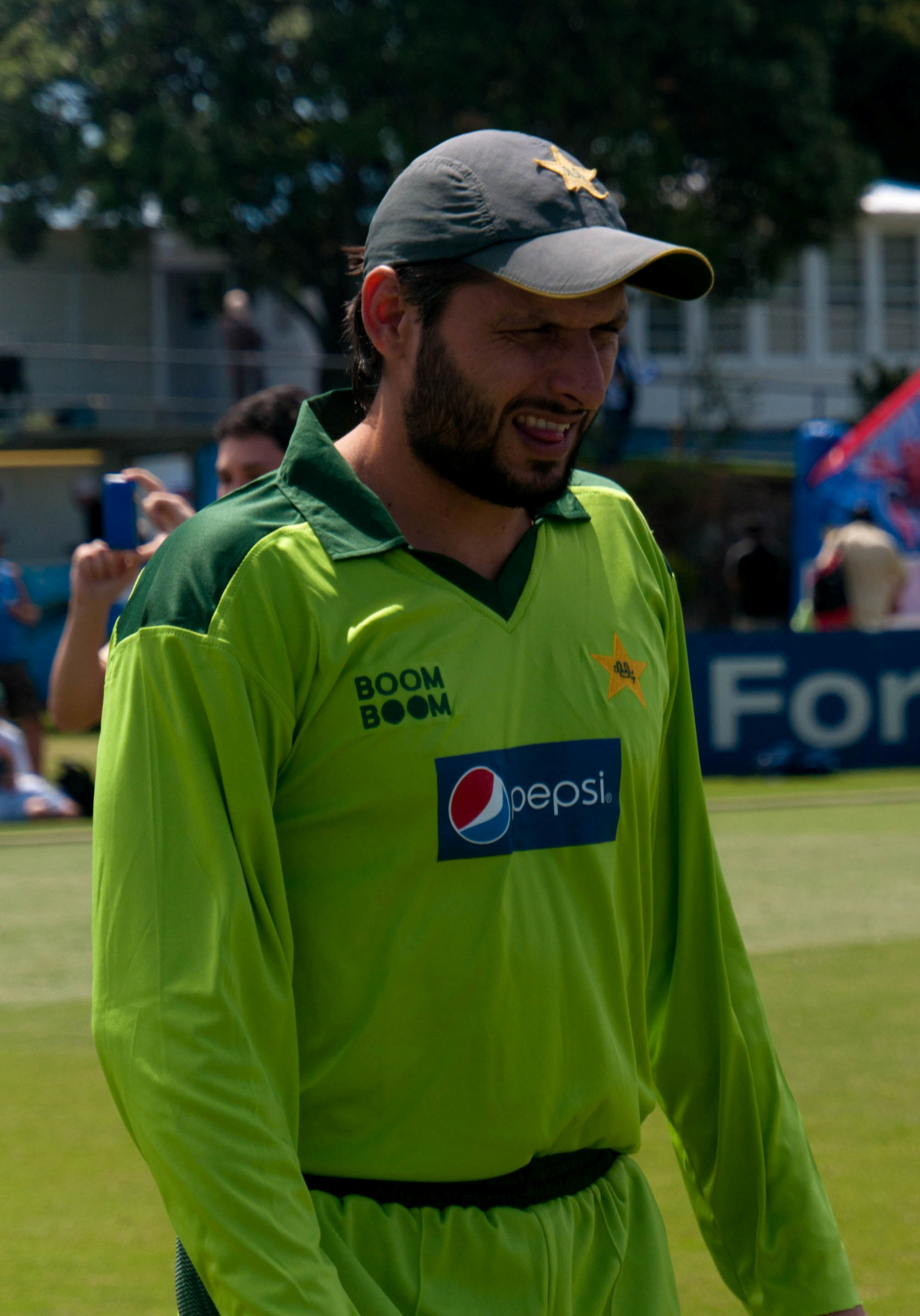
Shahid Afridi

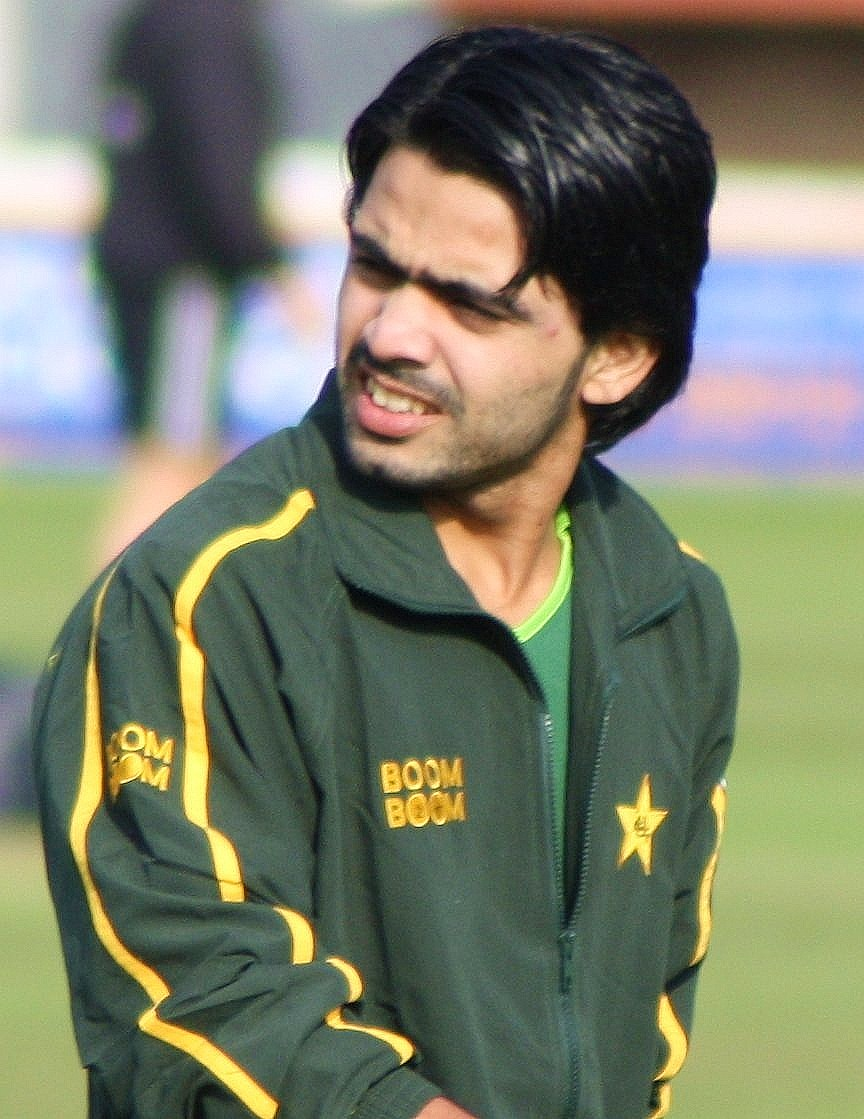
Fawad Alam

No.	Name	Nat	Birth date	Batting style	Bowling style	Notes
Batsmen
	**Babar Azam**	(Pakistan)	13 April 1994 (age 31)	Right–handed	Right–-arm Leg-break	
	**Khalid Latif**	(Pakistan)	4 November 1985 (age 40)	Right–handed	Right–arm Off break	
	**Shahzaib Hasan**	(Pakistan)	25 December 1989 (age 35)	Right–handed	Right–arm Off break	
All-rounders
	**Fawad Alam**	(Pakistan)	8 October 1985 (age 40)	Left–handed	Slow left-arm orthodox spin	
	**Anwar Ali**	(Pakistan)	18 October 1991 (age 34)	Right–handed	Right–arm fast medium	
10	**Shahid Afridi**	(Pakistan)	1 March 1975 (age 50)	Right–handed	Right–arm leg break	Captain
Wicket-keepers
	**Sarfraz Ahmed**	(Pakistan)	22 May 1987 (age 38)	Right–handed		
Bowlers
	Haaris Ayaz	(Pakistan)	16 October 1975 (age 50)	Right–handed	Right–arm Off break	
	**Mohammad Sami**	(Pakistan)	24 February 1981 (age 44)	Right–handed	Right–arm fast	
	Rumman Raees	(Pakistan)	18 October 1991 (age 34)	Right–handed	left–arm fast medium	
	Mir Hamza	(Pakistan)	18 October 1991 (age 34)	Right–handed	left–arm fast medium	
	**Sohail Khan**	(Pakistan)	6 March 1984 (age 41)	Right–handed	Right–arm fast medium	
	**Tanvir Ahmed**	(Pakistan)	20 December 1978 (age 46)	Right–handed	right–arm fast medium	

== Sponsors ==
Year	Team sponsor
2004-2008	Mobilink
2009	Bilwani's Mobile
2010	Al-khair Group
2011	Chawla Group
2012	Nokia
2013	Haier
2014	Advance Telecom
2015	QMobile

== Twenty20 records ==
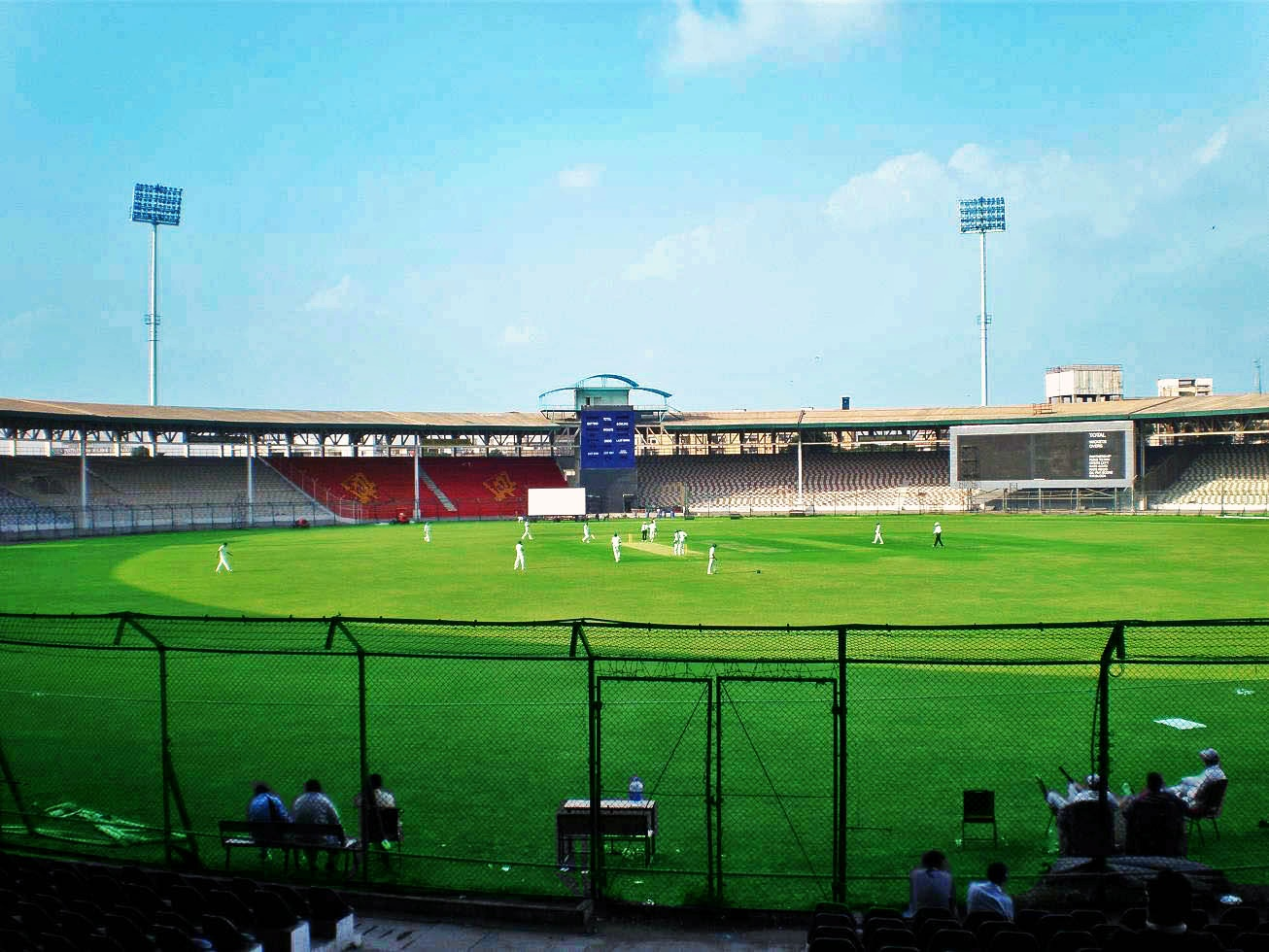
National Stadium, Karachi home ground of Karachi Dolphins

=== Batting ===
- Most runs: 1057 Khalid Latif
- Highest score: 112 Moin Khan vs. Lahore Lions
- Highest average: 53.00 Hasan Raza
- Highest strike rate: 242.85 Iftikhar Ali
- Most fifties: 7 Khalid Latif
- Most ducks: 3 Mohammad Sami
- Highest strike rates in an innings: 416.66 Tariq Haroon vs. Lahore Eagles

=== Bowling ===
- Most wickets: 40 wickets by Shahid Afridi
- Best bowling figures in a match: 6/25 by Irfanuddin vs. Sialkot Stallions in 2006
- Best average: 7.80 Irfanuddin
- Best economy rate: 5.74 Irfanuddin
- Best strike rate: 8.1 Irfanuddin
- Most 4 wickets in an innings (and over): 3 Irfanuddin
- Most 5 wickets in an innings: 1 Irfanuddin, Fawad Alam & Sohail Khan
- Best economy rate in an innings: 2.0 Mohammad Sami vs. Abbottabad Rhinos in 2006
- Best strike rate in an innings: 3.0 Tahir Khan vs. Islamabad Leopards
- Most runs conceded in an innings: 58 Iftikhar Ali vs. Faisalabad Wolves in 2005
- Most wickets in a series: 19 Irfanuddin in 2005/06

=== Wicket keeping ===
- Most dismissals: 33 Sarfraz Ahmed
- Most dismissals in an innings: 3 Afsar Nawaz (twice) & 3 Sarfraz Ahmed (three times)
- Most dismissals in a series: 11 Afsar Nawaz in 2005/06

=== Fielding ===
- Most catches: 20 by Mohammad Sami
- Most catches in an innings: 3 by Khurram Manzoor, Rameez Raja, Mohammad Sami & Asad Shafiq
- Most catches in a series: 5 by Rameez Raja

== Notable players ==
- Khalid Latif
- Shahzaib Hasan
- Asad Shafiq
- Rameez Raja
- Fawad Alam
- Shahid Afridi
- Sarfraz Ahmed
- Mohammad Sami
- Sohail Khan
- Tanvir Ahmed
- Mohammad Rizwan
- Shan Masood
- Inzamam Ul Haq
- Babar Azam

== Most matches as captain ==
Player	Playing span	Match	Won	Lost	Tied	NR	%
Shahid Afridi	2006–present	35	30	05	00	00	85.71
Mohammad Sami	2010–2013	17	10	06	01	00	61.76
Faisal Iqbal	2006–2006	06	04	02	00	00	66.66
Moin Khan	2005–2005	05	03	02	00	00	60.00
Khalid Latif	2009–2009	02	01	01	00	00	50.00
Naumanullah	2006–2006	01	00	01	00	00	00
Sarfraz Ahmed	2014–2016	04	00	00	00	00	00

The result percentage excludes no results and counts ties as half a win

== See also ==
- Pakistan Super League
- Faysal Bank T20 Cup
- Pakistan Cricket Board
- Cricket in Pakistan
- Larkana Bulls
