= Shahzad Tareen =

Pakistani cricketer (born 1988)

Personal information
- Born: 24 December 1988 (age 37)
- Source: Cricinfo, 27 March 2021

Shahzad Tareen (born 24 December 1988) is a Pakistani cricketer. He played in 39 first-class and 13 List A matches between 2007 and 2015. He made his Twenty20 debut on 7 February 2014, for Quetta Bears in the 2013–14 National T20 Cup.
