= Ali Mudassar =

Pakistani cricketer (born 1989)

Personal information
- Born: 2 April 1989 (age 37)
- Source: Cricinfo, 27 March 2021

Ali Mudassar (born 2 April 1989) is a Pakistani cricketer. He played in twelve first-class and eleven List A matches between 2009 and 2015. He made his Twenty20 debut on 7 February 2014, for Larkana Bulls in the 2013–14 National T20 Cup.
