= Zeeshan Malik =

Pakistani cricketer

Personal information
- Born: 26 December 1996 (age 29); Chakwal, Punjab, Pakistan
- Batting: Right-handed
- Bowling: Right-arm off-break
- Role: Batsman

Domestic team information
- Years: Team
- 2020/21-present: Northern
- Source: Cricinfo, 11 November 2020

Zeeshan Malik (born 26 December 1996) is a Pakistani cricketer. He made his Twenty20 debut on 8 September 2016 for Rawalpindi in the 2016–17 National T20 Cup. Prior to his T20 debut, he was part of Pakistan's squad for the 2016 Under-19 Cricket World Cup. He made his first-class debut for Rawalpindi in the 2016–17 Quaid-e-Azam Trophy on 1 October 2016.

In December 2018, he was named in Pakistan's team for the 2018 ACC Emerging Teams Asia Cup. In March 2019, he was named in Khyber Pakhtunkhwa's squad for the 2019 Pakistan Cup. In November 2020, he was named in Pakistan's 35-man squad for their tour to New Zealand. In October 2021, following the conclusion of the 2021–22 National T20 Cup, the Pakistan Cricket Board (PCB) suspended Malik from all cricket while they began an investigation under its anti-corruption code's Article 4.7.1, that covers a wide range of offences, including corruption and breach of a criminal law. The PCB refused to divulge the precise offence for which Malik was being investigated. He was allowed to return to cricket from 13 January 2022, and undertook a rehabilitation programme.
