= Zafar Ali (Pakistani cricketer) =

Pakistani cricketer (born 1986)

Personal information
- Born: 2 March 1986 (age 40); Naudero, Pakistan
- Source: Cricinfo, 27 March 2021

Zafar Ali (born 2 March 1986) is a Pakistani cricketer. He played in 30 first-class and 12 List A matches between 2004 and 2014. He made his Twenty20 debut on 7 February 2014, for Larkana Bulls in the 2013–14 National T20 Cup.
