= Irfan Ismail (Quetta cricketer) =

Pakistani cricketer (born 1988)

Personal information
- Full name: Mohammad Irfan Ismail
- Born: 20 September 1988 (age 38); Quetta, Balochistan, Pakistan
- Batting: Right-handed
- Bowling: Slow left-arm orthodox

Domestic team information
- Years: Team
- 2008: Quetta Bears
- 2008–2009: Quetta

Career statistics
Competition	FC	LA
Matches	2	4
Runs scored	24	1
Batting average	6.00	0.50
100s/50s	0/0	0/0
Top score	14	1*
Balls bowled	164	168
Wickets	1	3
Bowling average	135.00	48.66
5 wickets in innings	0	0
10 wickets in match	0	n/a
Best bowling	1/67	2/37
Catches/stumpings	0/–	2/–
- Source: CricketArchive, 16 December 2014

Mohammad Irfan Ismail (born 20 September 1988) is a Pakistani cricketer who has played first-class matches for Quetta and limited overs matches for the Quetta Bears.

From Quetta, a city in Balochistan, Irfan played inter-district matches for the Quetta under-19s from 2006, graduating to the Quetta District senior side in 2008. He made his limited-overs debut for the Quetta Bears franchise in March 2008, during the 2007–08 season of the ABN-AMRO Cup. A left-arm orthodox spinner and left-handed lower-order batsman, Irfan took three wickets from four matches at the tournament, with his best figures, 2/37 from 9.1 overs, coming against the Lahore Lions.

Irfan made his first-class debut for Quetta the following season, against the Karachi Blues in the Quaid-i-Azam Trophy. He took only a single wicket on debut, and in the next game (his last), against Multan, he went wicketless. He consequently has a first-class average of 135.00. Mohammad Irfan Ismail (born 1992), another left-arm orthodox-spinner, also made a first-class appearance for Quetta during the 2008–09 season. To avoid confusion, Irfan Ismail (born 1988), the subject of this article, is sometimes referred to as "Irfan Ismail, Sr.", while Irfan Ismail (born 1992) is sometimes referred to as "Irfan Ismail, Jr.".
