= Zohaib =

Zohaib or Zuhaib is a given name. Notable people with this name include:

- Zohaib Kazi (born 1984), Pakistani musician, composer, lyricist, and record producer
- Zohaib Khan (born 1984), Pakistani cricketer
- Zohaib Ahmed (born 1986), Pakistani cricketer
- Zohaib Bux (born 1987), Pakistani fashion model
- Zohaib Shera (born 1990), Pakistani cricketer
- Zohaib Ahmadzai (born 2002), Afghan cricketer
- Zuhaib Zubair (born 2003), Emirati cricketer
- Zuhaib Ahmad (born 2009), Entrepreneur and Prodigy
