= Irfanuddin =

Pakistani cricketer (born 1982)

Personal information
- Born: 21 September 1982 (age 44); Karachi, Pakistan
- Source: Cricinfo, 10 November 2015

Irfanuddin (born 21 September 1982) is a Pakistani first-class cricketer who played for Karachi cricket team.
