= United Mobile =

Swiss company

United Mobile was a Swiss company, operating in Kloten (near Zurich Airport) as a "branch" of a company based in Liechtenstein (for tax and legal purposes) and providing prepaid SIM cards offering low roaming costs, based on call back business approach.

As of October 6, 2009, the United Mobile website was taken down except for a single page which indicated "United Mobile would like to apologise for interruption in service to customers." No further information is available. Competitor's websites indicate that United Mobile is no longer in business. As of July 22, 2009, United Mobile has applied for bankruptcy with the district court in Liechtenstein.
