= Ijaz Ahmed (cricketer, born 1957) =

Pakistani cricketer (born 1957)

Personal information
- Born: 19 September 1957 (age 69); Lahore, Pakistan
- Source: Cricinfo, 12 November 2015

Ijaz Ahmed (born 19 September 1957) is a Pakistani former first-class cricketer who played for Lahore cricket team. Later he was an umpire and stood in matches in the 2008–09 RBS Twenty-20 Cup.
