= Zohaib Shera =

Pakistani cricketer (born 1990)

Personal information
- Born: 18 August 1990 (age 36); Karachi, Pakistan
- Source: Cricinfo, 24 November 2015

Zohaib Shera (born 18 August 1990) is a Pakistani first-class cricketer who plays for Port Qasim Authority.

== Career ==
Shera made his first-class debut in 2009-10 and became the first cricketer to achieve a hat-trick on debut in Pakistan.

Shera made his Twenty20 cricket debut for Karachi Blues in the 2016–17 National T20 Cup on 6 September 2016.
