= Zafar Ali (Indian cricketer) =

Indian cricketer (born 1987)

Personal information
- Full name: Zafar Ali
- Born: 21 September 1987 (age 39); Shahdol, Madhya Pradesh, India
- Batting: Right-handed
- Role: Wicketkeeper

Domestic team information
- Years: Team
- 2007–: Madhya Pradesh

Career statistics
Competition	FC	LA	T20
Matches	14	3	12
Runs scored	421	67	196
Batting average	19.13	22.33	21.77
100s/50s	0/3	0/0	0/1
Top score	98	33	70*
Catches/stumpings	22/–	2/–	9/–
- Source: Cricinfo, 26 February, 2016

Zafar Ali (born 21 September 1987) is an Indian cricketer who plays for Madhya Pradesh cricket team. He is a right-handed wicket-keeper batsman. He normally plays as a back-up keeper to Naman Ojha on the team.

He made his List A debut in February 2007 against Vidarbha cricket team at Maharani Usharaje Trust Cricket Ground as an opener, where he scored 33 runs.

He made his Twenty20 debut in March 2007 against Tamil Nadu cricket team at Sardar Patel Stadium as an opener, where he scored 22 runs and took 2 catches.

He made his first-class debut in November 2008 against Services cricket team at Palam A Ground as a batsman, where he scored 11 runs.

In 2011, he scored a defiant 98 runs off 291 balls, but was not able to prevent Tamil Nadu cricket team from taking a lead of 197 runs.
