= Muhammad Akhlaq Ahmed =

Pakistani field hockey player (born 1971)

Personal information
- Native name: محمد اخلاق احمد
- Born: 4 December 1971
- Died: 25 November 2016 (aged 44) Lahore, Pakistan
Medal record
Representing Pakistan
Men's Field hockey
Olympic Games
Bronze medal – third place	1992 Barcelona	Team

Muhammad Akhlaq Ahmed (Urdu: محمد اخلاق احمد; born 4 December 1971 — 25 November 2016) was a Pakistani field hockey player. He won a bronze medal at the 1992 Summer Olympics in Barcelona. He died of cancer on 25 November 2016 at the age 44.

The 44-year-old was diagnosed with cancer following a dental procedure in Malaysia a few months ago. Since then he had been receiving treatment but his health deteriorated and he was admitted at the CMH Hospital in Lahore where he died.
