= Marghzar Cricket Ground =

Cricket ground in Islamabad, Pakistan

- Interactive map of Marghzar Cricket Ground
- Location: Islamabad, Pakistan
- Country: Pakistan
- Coordinates: 33.739139471538806°N 73.06953372251597°E
- Establishment: 1988/89
- Owner: Municipal Corporation of Islamabad
- As of 22 September 2016; Source: Ground profile

The Marghzar Cricket Ground is a cricket ground in Islamabad, Pakistan located near Saidpur village. The first recorded match on the ground was in the 1988/89 season. The ground has hosted more than 40 first-class matches since 1993. It was selected as a venue to host a match in the 2016–17 Quaid-e-Azam Trophy.

== See also ==
- List of cricket grounds in Pakistan
