= Kashif Naved =

Pakistani cricketer (born 1983)

Personal information
- Born: 15 August 1983 (age 43); Chichawatni, Pakistan
- Batting: Right-handed
- Bowling: Slow left-arm Orthodox
- Source: Cricinfo, 8 November 2015

Kashif Naved (born 15 August 1983) is a Pakistani first-class cricketer who played for Faisalabad cricket team.
