= FATA Cheetas =

FATA Cheetahs
Personnel
- Captain: (Pakistan) Riaz Afridi
- Coach: (Pakistan) Ayaz Akbar
- Owner: FATA Cricket Association

Team information
- Colors
- Founded: 2013
- Dissolved: 2016
- Official website: FATA Cheetahs

The FATA Cheetahs was a limited overs cricket team based in FATA, Pakistan. The team was established during 2013-14 Faysal Bank T20 Cup.

== Squad ==
- Riaz Afridi - Captain
- Abdul Manan
- Almar Afridi
- Asad Afridi
- Asif Afridi
- Asif Ali
- Ibrahim Gul
- Inamullah
- Khushdil Shah
- Muhammad Aslam
- Muhammad Irfan
- Muhammad Naeem
- Rehan Afridi
- Sabyar Afridi
- Saeed Khan
- Shakeel Shah
- Zakir Afridi
- Zeeshan Khan

== Result summary ==
=== T20 results ===
Summary of results by season
	Played	Wins	Losses	No Result	% Win
2013-14	2	0	2	0	00.00%
Total	2	0	2	0	00.00%

Results by opposition
	Played	Wins	Losses	No Result	% Win
Karachi Zebras	1	0	1	0	00.00%
Rawalpindi Rams	1	0	1	0	00.00%
Total	2	0	2	0	00.00%

== Captains' record ==
Player	Span	Match	Won	Lost	Tied	NR	%
Riaz Afridi	2014–present	2	0	2	0	0	00.00

== Sponsor ==
2013-14 kit sponsors of the FATA team was Nobel TV.

== See also ==
- Pakistan Super League
- Federally Administered Tribal Areas cricket team
