= Dera Murad Jamali Ibexes =

Personnel
- Captain: (Pakistan) Taimur Ali

Team information
- Founded: 2014
- Dissolved: 2016

History
- Haier T20 Cup wins: 0
- Official website: DMJ Ibexes

The Dera Murad Jamali Ibexes was a Pakistani men's professional Twenty20 cricket team that competed in the Haier T20 League and was based in Dera Murad Jamali, Balochistan.

== See also ==
- Dera Murad Jamali cricket team
