= Abbottabad Falcons =

Abbottabad Falcons ایبٹ آباد فالکنز

Personnel
- Captain: (Pakistan) Babar Azam
- Coach: (Pakistan) Sajjad Akbar

Team information
- Colours
- Founded: 2005
- Dissolved: 2016
- Home ground: Abbottabad Cricket Stadium
- Capacity: 16,000

History
- Haier T20 Cup wins: 0

The Abbottabad Falcons (Urdu: ایبٹ آباد فالکنز) was a Pakistani men's professional Twenty20 cricket team that competed in the Haier T20 League and was based in Abbottabad, Khyber Pakhtunkhwa, Pakistan. The Falcons played at the Abbottabad Cricket Stadium, which the Pakistan Cricket Board declared a first-class ground in 2010.

== History ==
The Falcons were formed in 2005 as the "Abbottabad Rhinos". They changed their name to Abbottabad Falcons during the 2010-11 season.

== Seasons ==
Year	National Twenty20 Cup
2005*	League stage
2006*	League stage
2007*	Not Held
2008*	League stage
2009*	League stage
2010*	League stage
2011*	League stage
2012	League stage
2013	League stage
2014	Semi-finals
2015	League stage
2016	League stage
2017	Did not qualify

Note: * indicates participations as Abbottabad Rhinos.

== See also ==
- Peshawar Panthers
- Pakistan Super League
