= Rameez Raja Jr. =

Pakistani cricketer

Rameez Raja
Personal information
- Born: 31 July 1987 (age 39); Karachi, Sindh, Pakistan
- Batting: Right-handed
- Bowling: Right-arm off break
- Role: All-rounder

International information
- National side: Pakistan (2011)
- T20I debut (cap 43): 16 September 2011 v Zimbabwe
- Last T20I: 18 September 2011 v Zimbabwe

Domestic team information
- Years: Team
- 2007/08–2014/15: Karachi
- 2008/09–2009/10: Pakistan Customs
- 2010/11: Sindh
- 2011/12–2013/14: State Bank
- 2012: Barisal Burners
- 2016/17–2018/19: National Bank
- 2017/18: Quetta Gladiators

Career statistics
Competition	T20I	FC	LA	T20
Matches	2	85	77	51
Runs scored	24	4,160	2,448	1,243
Batting average	12.00	27.18	33.53	21.43
100s/50s	0/0	5/21	4/15	0/5
Top score	23	150	144	97
Catches/stumpings	0/–	57/–	26/–	23/–
- Source: Cricinfo, 10 December 2022

Rameez Raja (born 31 July 1987) is a Pakistani former cricketer who represented Pakistan national cricket team in 2011. He was a right-hand batsman and right-arm offbreak bowler.

== Career ==
He played for the Pakistani U-19 cricket team at the 2006 U-19 Cricket World Cup, which Pakistan won by defeating India in the final. In the low-scoring final match, Raja was the top scorer with 25 runs off 67 balls.

In April 2018, he was named in Baluchistan's squad for the 2018 Pakistan Cup. He was the leading run-scorer for National Bank of Pakistan in the 2018–19 Quaid-e-Azam One Day Cup, with 449 runs in eight matches. In March 2019, he was named in Federal Areas' squad for the 2019 Pakistan Cup.
