= Karachi Zebras =

Personnel
- Captain: (Pakistan) Rameez Raja Jr.
- Coach: (Pakistan) Azam Khan

Team information
- Colours
- Founded: 2005
- Dissolved: 2016
- Home ground: National Stadium, Karachi
- Capacity: 34,228

Karachi Zebras was a Pakistani domestic first-class, List A and T20 cricket team, based in Karachi, Sindh. The team was established in 2006 and its home ground was National Stadium, Karachi. It was dissolved in 2016.

== Most matches as captain ==
Player	Playing Span	Match	Won	Lost	Tied	NR	%
Hasan Raza	2006-2012	11	05	06	00	00	45.45
Faisal Iqbal	2008-2010	06	00	06	00	00	00.00
Rameez Raja	2012-2012	06	02	04	00	00	33.33
Danish Kaneria	2010-2011	05	02	03	00	00	40.00
Shadab Kabir	2005-2005	03	02	01	00	00	66.66

== See also ==
- Pakistan Super League
- Larkana Bulls
