= Riazuddin (umpire) =

Pakistani cricket umpire (1958–2019)

Personal information
- Born: 15 December 1958; Karachi, Pakistan
- Died: 11 June 2019 (aged 60); Karachi, Pakistan
- Role: Umpire

Umpiring information
- Tests umpired: 12 (1990–2002)
- ODIs umpired: 12 (1990–2000)
- WTests umpired: 1 (2004)
- WODIs umpired: 7 (2001–2006)
- WT20Is umpired: 2 (2015)
- Source: Cricinfo, 12 June 2019

Riazuddin (15 December 1958 – 11 June 2019) was a Pakistani cricket umpire.

== Career ==
In an international umpiring career spanning 12 years, he officiated in 12 Test matches between 1990 and 2002 and 12 One Day Internationals between 1990 and 2000. He was one of the on-field umpires in the final of the 2010–11 Quaid-e-Azam Trophy. Riazuddin officiated in 310 first-class matches, a Pakistan record. He also stood in women's cricket, the 2017–18 Bangladesh Premier League, five Quaid-e-Azam Trophy finals, and two Patron's Trophy finals.

In addition to umpiring, Riazuddin played club cricket as a right-handed batsman and off-break bowler, was CEO of Al-Imran Cricket Club in Karachi, and retired from the Pakistan National Shipping Corporation shortly before his death.

== See also ==
- List of Test cricket umpires
- List of One Day International cricket umpires
