= Larkana Bulls =

Personnel
- Captain: (Pakistan) Zahid Mahmood
- Coach: (Pakistan) Iqbal Imam
- Owner: Larkana-RCA

Team information
- Colours
- Founded: 2013
- Dissolved: 2016

The Larkana Bulls was a limited overs cricket team based in Larkana, Sindh, Pakistan. The team was established in 2013-14 and contested in domestic cricket competitionscricket competitions.

== Squad ==
Squad of Larkana Bulls:

- Shahid Afridi (C)
- Zahid Mehmood
- Ahsan Ali
- Shahnawaz Dahani
- Carlos Brathwite
- Imran Tahir
- Ayaz Jamali
- Ghulam Yasin
- Imran Chandio
- Imtiaz Ali
- Mohammad Siddiq
- Mohammad Urs
- Mohammad Waqas
- Nasrullah Memon
- Noor Din
- Babar Azam
- Shabbir Ahmed
- Azam Khan (WK)
- Mohammad Rizwan (WK)

== Result summary ==
=== T20 results ===
Summary of results by season
	Played	Wins	Losses	No Result	% Win
2013-14	4	2	2	0	50.00%
Total	4	2	2	0	50.00%

Results by opposition
	Played	Wins	Losses	No Result	% Win
Faisalabad Wolves	1	0	1	0	00.00%
Hyderabad Hawks	1	1	0	0	100.00%
Karachi Dolphins	1	1	0	0	100.00%
Sialkot Stallions	1	0	1	0	00.00%
Total	4	2	2	0	50.00%

== Captains' record ==
Player	Span	Match	Won	Lost	Tied	NR	%
Zahid Mahmood	2014–Present	4	2	2	0	0	50.00

== Sponsor ==
2013-14 kit sponsors of the Larkana Bulls team was Mughal Steel.

== See also ==
- Pakistan Super League
