= Peshawar Panthers =

Personnel
- Captain: (Pakistan) Mohammad Rizwan
- Owner: PRCA

Team information
- Colours
- Founded: 2004
- Dissolved: 2016
- Home ground: Arbab Niaz Stadium
- Capacity: 25,000

History
- Haier T20 Cup wins: 2(2014/15)(2015-16)
- Haier Super 8 T20 Cup wins: 0

The Peshawar Panthers was a domestic T20 and List A cricket team based in Peshawar, Khyber Pakhtunkhwa, Pakistan. The team was established in 2004 and its home ground was Arbab Niaz Stadium.

== Winners ==
Peshawar Panthers won Haier T20 Cup 2014-15, beating Lahore Lions on the back of an unbeaten half century (50*) by Iftikhar Ahmed. Scoreboard: Cricinfo

== Reserves ==
Name	Batting	Bowling	Role
Azam Khan	Right Hand Bat	Right Arm Medium Fast	Bowler
Azizullah	Right Hand Bat	Right Arm Medium Fast	Bowler
Jibran Khan	Right Hand Bat	Slow Left-Arm Orthodox	Bowler

== Former Notable Players ==
Name	Batting	Bowling	Role
Umar Gul ###	Right Hand Bat	Right Arm Medium Fast	Bowler
Yasir Hameed ###	Right Hand Bat	Right Arm Offbreak	Opening Batsman Occasional Wicket Keeper
Wajahatullah Wasti ###	Right Hand Bat	Right Arm Offbreak	Top Order Batsman
Younis Khan ###	Right Hand Bat	Right Arm Medium	Top Order Batsman
Fazl-e-Akbar ###	Right Hand Bat	Right Arm Medium Fast	Bowler
