= Lahore Eagles =

Lahore Eagles لاہور ایگلز

Team information
- Colours
- Founded: 2006
- Dissolved: 2016
- Home ground: Gaddafi Stadium
- Capacity: 27,000

The Lahore Eagles was a National T20 Cup team, based in Lahore, Punjab, Pakistan. The team was established in 2006 and its home ground was Gaddafi Stadium.

== See also ==
- Pakistan Super League
