= Islamabad Leopards =

Cricket team based in Islamabad, Pakistan

- اسلام آباد لیپرڈز
- League: National T20 Cup

Personnel
- Owner: Islamabad Cricket Association

Team information
- Colours
- Founded: 2004
- Dissolved: 2016
- Home ground: Quaid-i-Azam Stadium
- Capacity: 20,000

The Islamabad Leopards was a domestic T20 and List A cricket team, based in Islamabad, Pakistan. The team was established in 2004 and dissolved in 2016.

== Notable players ==
- Shoaib Akhtar
- Umer Gul
- Iftikhar Anjum
- Bazid Khan
- Shan Masood
- Babar Azam
- Imad Wasim

== See also ==
- Pakistan Super League
