= Quetta Bears =

Personnel
- Captain: (Pakistan) Irfan Ismail
- Coach: (Pakistan) Abdul Rehman

Team information
- Colours
- Founded: 2004
- Dissolved: 2016
- Home ground: Bugti Stadium
- Capacity: 20,000

The Quetta Bears was a domestic T20 and List A team, based in Quetta, Balochistan, Pakistan. The team was established in 2004 and competed in domestic cricket competitions until its dissolution in 2016. The Bears' home ground was Bugti Stadium, Quetta.

== See also ==
- Pakistan Super League
