= Hamad (name) =

Hammad Ali
- Gender: Male
- Language: Arabic

Hamad, (Arabic: حمد) or Hammad is a masculine given name and surname of Arabic origin. Notable people with the name include:

== Given name ==
=== Hamad ===
- Hamad Al-Abdan (born 2000), Saudi Arabian footballer
- Hamad Al Abedy (born 1991), Qatari football player
- Hamad Al-Ahbabi (born 1991), Emirati footballer
- Hamad Aladwani, Kuwaiti paralympic athlete sprinter
- Hamad Almatar (born 1970), Kuwaiti politician
- Hamad Aman (born 1989), Kuwaiti footballer
- Hamad Amar (born 1964), Israeli Druze politician and Member of Knesset
- Hamad Rakea Al-Anezi (born 1984), Bahraini footballer
- Hamad Al-Asmar (born 1987), Jordanian football player
- Hamad Mubarak al-Attiya (born 1972), Qatari footballer
- Hamad Al-Attiyah (born 1995), Qatari equestrian
- Hamad bin Ali Al Attiyah, Qatari politician
- Hamad Al-Azani (born 1973), Omani football manager and footballer
- Hamad Bader, Bahraini swimmer
- Hamad Al-Balooshi (born 1995), Emirati footballer
- Hamad Pasha Al-Basil (1871–1940), Egyptian revolutionary
- Hamad Butt (1962–1994), British-Pakistani artist
- Hamad Al-Dawsari (born 1994), Saudi Arabian footballer
- Hamad Mubarak Al-Dosari (born 1977), Qatari hurdler
- Hamad Al-Easa (born 1972), Kuwaiti footballer
- Hamad Al-Eissa (born 1982), Saudi Arabian footballer
- Hamad Al Enezi (born 1986), Kuwaiti football player
- Hamad Al-Eissa (born 1982), Saudi Arabian football player
- Hamad Al Fardan (born 1987), Bahraini racing driver
- Hamad Ganayem (born 1987), Israeli Arab football player
- Hamad al-Hajji (1939–1988), Saudi poet
- Hamad Al-Hamad (born 1987), Saudi Arabian footballer
- Hamad Ali Hamad (born 1964), Tanzanian politician and Member of Parliament
- Hamad Al-Hammadi (born 1991), Emirati footballer
- Hamad Al-Hammadi (table tennis) (born 1975), Qatari table tennis player
- Hamad Al Harbi (born 1980), Kuwaiti football player
- Hamad Hasan (born 1969), Lebanese academic and politician
- Hamad-ul-Hasan (born 1988), Pakistani first-class cricketer
- Hamad Al-Hosani (born 1987), Emirati footballer
- Hamad Ibrahim (born 1994), Emirati footballer
- Hamad Jalal (born 1995), Emirati footballer
- Hamad Abbas Janahi (born 1990), Emirati tennis player
- Hamad Jassim (born 1996), Emirati footballer
- Hamad Al-Jassir (1907–2000), Saudi Arabian journalist and historian
- Hamad Al-Jayzani (born 1993), Saudi footballer
- Hamad Al-Juhaim (born 1987), Saudi footballer
- Hamad Bin Abdulaziz Al-Kawari (born 1948), Qatari diplomat and politician
- Hamad Khalaily (1928–2014), Israeli-Arab politician and Member of the Knesset
- Hamad bin Isa Al Khalifa (1872–1942), Bahraini ruler
- Hamad bin Isa Al Khalifa (born 1950), Bahraini ruler
- Hamad Al Kooheji, Bahraini politician, merchant, and social activist
- Hamad Madadi (born 1988), Iranian-Qatari handball player
- Hamad Kalkaba Malboum (1950–2026), Cameroonian athletics official
- Hamad Mansour (born 1994), Qatari footballer
- Hamad Al Mansour (born 1993), Saudi footballer
- Hamad Al Marri (born 1991), Emirati footballer
- Hamad Al-Marzouqi (born 1996), Emirati footballer
- Hamad Masauni (born 1973), Tanzanian politician and member of Parliament
- Hamad Medjedovic (born 2003), Serbian tennis player
- Hamad Al-Meqbaali (born 2003), Emirati footballer
- Hamad Al-Midlij (born 1984), Kuwaiti politician
- Hamad Khaled Mohamed, Kuwaiti footballer
- Hamad Rashid Mohamed (born 1950), Tanzanian politician and Member of Parliament
- Hamad Al-Montashari (born 1982), Saudi footballer
- Hamad Mousa (born 2006), Qatari basketball player
- Hamad bin Ibrahim Al Mualla (died 1929), Emirati ruler
- Hamad al-Naqi (born 1988), Kuwaiti blogger imprisoned for his writings
- Hamad Ndee (born 1951), Tanzanian sprinter
- Hamad Ndikumana (1978–2017), Rwandan football player
- Hamad Niazi (1891–1950), Egyptian fencer
- Hamad Al-Obeidi (born 1991), Qatari footballer
- Hamad Al-Qallaf (born 1999), Kuwaiti footballer
- Hamad Abu Rabia (1929–1981), Bedouin Israeli politician and Member of Knesset
- Hamad Al-Rubaie (born 1981), Saudi footballer
- Hamad Sa'b (1892–1941), Lebanese Druze guerilla fighter
- Hamad Jaber Al-Ali Al-Sabah (born 1966), Kuwaiti politician and diplomat
- Hamad Al-Mubarak Al-Sabah (1894–1938), Kuwaiti royal
- Hamad Al-Sagoor (born 1979), Saudi Arabian football player
- Hamad bin Said (died 1792), Sultan of Oman
- Hamad Samy (1899–??), Egyptian weightlifter
- Hamad Al-Sayyaf (born 2002), Saudi footballer
- Hamad Al-Shamsan (born 1997), Bahraini footballer
- Hamad bin Abdullah Al Sharqi, Emirati monarch
- Hamad bin Mohammed Al Sharqi (born 1949), Emirati royal and politician
- Hamad bin Mohammed Al Al-Sheikh (born 1959), Saudi politician
- Hamad bin Abdulaziz Al Suwailem, Saudi government minister
- Hamad Al Tayyar (born 1982), Kuwaiti football player
- Hamad bin Abdullah Al Thani (1896–1948), Qatari royal
- Hamad bin Jabor Al Thani, Qatari politician
- Hamad bin Jassim bin Hamad Al Thani (born 1959), Qatari politician
- Hamad bin Jassim bin Jaber Al Thani (born 1959), Qatari politician
- Hamad bin Khalid Al Thani (1952–2012), Qatari entrepreneur
- Hamad bin Khalifa Al Thani (1952–2026), Qatari royal and ruler
- Hamad Bin Khalifa Bin Ahmed Al-Thani (born 1968), Qatari football administrator and coach
- Hamad bin Suhaim Al Thani (born 1958), Qatari politician
- Hamad bin Thamer Al Thani, Qatari journalist and director general of the Al Jazeera Media Network
- Hamad bin Thuwaini of Zanzibar (1857–1896), Sultan of Zanzibar
- Hamad Al-Yami (born 1999), Saudi footballer
- Najm Hamad Al Ahmad (born 1969), Syrian jurist and justice minister

=== Hammad ===
- Hammad Ali (born 1990), Pakistani cricketer
- Hammad al-Ansari (1925–1997), Malian Islamic scholar
- Hammad Azam (born 1991), Pakistani cricketer
- Hammad Azhar (born 1974), Pakistani politician
- Hammad al-Barbari, Abbasid general and governor
- Hammad ibn Buluggin (died 1029), ruler of the Hammadid dynasty
- Hammad Farooqui (born 1989), Pakistani actor and model
- Hammad al-Harrani (died 1202), Ayyubid Islamic scholar
- Hammad Nawaz Khan (born 1964), Pakistani politician
- Hammad Miah (born 1993), English snooker player
- Hammad Niazi (born 1984), Pakistani Urdu language poet
- Hammad Ar-Rawiya, Iranian scholar
- Hammad ibn Salamah (died 783), Arab grammarian
- Hammad Shahid (born 1991), American cricketer
- Hammad Shehab (died 1973), Iraqi general
- Hammad Shoaib (born 1997), Pakistani television actor
- Hammad Siddiqui, Pakistani politician
- Hammad ibn Abi Sulayman (died 738), Kufan Islamic jurist
- Hammad Tariq (born 1980), Pakistani cricketer
- Hammad bin Zayd (716–795), Iraqi Islamic scholar

== Surname ==
- Abdérazak Hamad (born 1975), Algerian handball player
- Adnan Hamad (born 1961), Iraqi international football player
- Ali Ahmed Ali Hamad, Bahraini alleged Al Qaeda commander
- Bahiya Al-Hamad (born 1992), Qatari rifle shooter
- Essam Hamad (born 1973), Iraqi football player
- Fathi Hamad (born 1961), Palestinian political leader in Hamas
- Ghazi Hamad (born 1964), Palestinian politician and administrator
- Hassan Ahmed Hamad, Egyptian athlete
- Ibrahim Mahmoud Hamad (born 1956), Sudanese politician
- Jiloan Hamad (born 1990), Swedish football player
- Karam al-Hamad (born 1990), Syrian journalist and human rights activist
- Khalil Abou Hamad (1936–1992), Lebanese lawyer and politician
- Mehad Hamad, Emirati artist
- Mesaad Al-Hamad (born 1986), Qatari football player
- Rashid Hamad (born 1987), Qatari sport shooter
- Salameh Hammad (born 1944), Jordanian politician
- Sam Hamad (born 1958), Canadian politician
- Seif Sharif Hamad (1943–2021), Zanzibari politician
- Turki al-Hamad (born 1952), Saudi Arabian political analyst, journalist, and novelist

== See also ==
- Hamad (disambiguation)
