= 2009–10 National Twenty20 Cup =

Cricket tournament

2009–10 RBS Twenty-20 Cup
- Dates: 28 February – 7 March 2010
- Administrator: Pakistan Cricket Board
- Cricket format: Twenty20
- Tournament format(s): Round-robin and knockout
- Host: Pakistan
- Champions: Sialkot Stallions (5th title)
- Participants: 13
- Matches: 18
- Player of the series: Mohammad Hafeez (Faisalabad Wolves); Aizaz Cheema (Lahore Lions)
- Most runs: Mohammad Hafeez (187)
- Most wickets: Aizaz Cheema (11)

The 2009–10 RBS Twenty-20 Cup was the sixth edition of the domestic RBS Twenty-20 Cup in Pakistan, sponsored by the Royal Bank of Scotland. It was held from 28 February to 7 March 2010 at the National Stadium, Karachi. This edition had 13 competing teams divided into four groups. Sialkot Stallions successfully defended the title and won the tournament for the fifth consecutive time, defeating Faisalabad Wolves in the final by 5 wickets.

== Results ==
=== Teams and standings ===
The top team from each group qualified for the semi-finals.

Group A
| Team | Pld | W | L | T | NR | Pts | NRR |
|---|---|---|---|---|---|---|---|
| Lahore Lions | 3 | 3 | 0 | 0 | 0 | 6 | +2.971 |
| Multan Tigers | 3 | 2 | 1 | 0 | 0 | 4 | +0.826 |
| Peshawar Panthers | 3 | 1 | 2 | 0 | 0 | 2 | −0.831 |
| Quetta Bears | 3 | 0 | 3 | 0 | 0 | 0 | −2.780 |

Group B
| Team | Pld | W | L | T | NR | Pts | NRR |
|---|---|---|---|---|---|---|---|
| Sialkot Stallions | 2 | 2 | 0 | 0 | 0 | 4 | +0.525 |
| Rawalpindi Rams | 2 | 1 | 1 | 0 | 0 | 2 | −0.150 |
| Karachi Zebras | 2 | 0 | 2 | 0 | 0 | 0 | −0.375 |

Group C
| Team | Pld | W | L | T | NR | Pts | NRR |
|---|---|---|---|---|---|---|---|
| Faisalabad Wolves | 2 | 2 | 0 | 0 | 0 | 4 | +3.184 |
| Islamabad Leopards | 2 | 1 | 1 | 0 | 0 | 2 | −0.145 |
| Abbottabad Rhinos | 2 | 0 | 2 | 0 | 0 | 0 | −3.036 |

Group D
| Team | Pld | W | L | T | NR | Pts | NRR |
|---|---|---|---|---|---|---|---|
| Karachi Dolphins | 2 | 2 | 0 | 0 | 0 | 4 | +6.533 |
| Lahore Eagles | 2 | 1 | 1 | 0 | 0 | 2 | −0.969 |
| Hyderabad Hawks | 2 | 0 | 2 | 0 | 0 | 0 | −3.619 |

Qualified for semifinals

=== Knockout stage ===
Semifinals
A1 | Lahore Lions | 166/9
C1 | Faisalabad Wolves | 211/5
B1 | Sialkot Stallions | 149/7
D1 | Karachi Dolphins | 142

Finals
C1 | Faisalabad Wolves | 109/9
B1 | Sialkot Stallions | 110/5

== Fixtures ==
=== Group stage ===
==== Group A ====
28 February 2010
(Scorecard)

| Lahore Lions; 196/5 (20 overs) | v | Quetta Bears; 91/9 (20 overs) |
| Kamran Akmal 68* (44); Jalat Khan 1/30 [4] | | Arun Lal 32 (43); Aizaz Cheema 4/17 [4] |

Lahore Lions won by 105 runs
National Stadium, Karachi, Sindh
Umpires: Jamil Kamran and Riazuddin
Player of the match: Aizaz Cheema (Lahore Lions)

- Quetta Bears won the toss and chose to field.
- Abdul Jabbar, Nasrullah Khan and Taimur Khan (Quetta Bears) all made their T20 debuts.

28 February 2010
(Scorecard)

| Multan Tigers; 146/8 (20 overs) | v | Peshawar Panthers; 124 (19.2 overs) |
| Naved Yasin 35 (28); Jannisar Khan 3/25 [3] | | Israrullah 48 (42); Zulfiqar Babar 4/26 [4] |

Multan Tigers won by 22 runs
National Stadium, Karachi, Sindh
Umpires: Akram Raza and Shozab Raza
Player of the match: Zulfiqar Babar (Multan Tigers)

- Multan Tigers won the toss and chose to bat
- Junaid Iqbal, Mohammad Irfan, Shahid Akram, Zulfiqar Babar (Multan Tigers); Azam Jan, Hamad-ul-Hasan, Israrullah, Kashif Hayat and Mohammad Idrees (Peshawar Panthers) all made their T20 debuts.

1 March 2010
(Scorecard)

| Quetta Bears; 99 (19.5 overs) | v | Multan Tigers; 103/3 (16.3 overs) |
| Abdul Majeed 32 (34); Mohammad Hafeez 4/17 [4] | | Rameez Alam 52 (50); Nazar Hussain 2/24 [3] |

Multan Tigers won by 7 wickets
National Stadium, Karachi, Sindh
Umpires: Akram Raza and Khalid Mahmood
Player of the match: Mohammad Hafeez (Multan Tigers)

- Quetta Bears won the toss and chose to bat.
- Naushad Irshad and Taimur Siddiq (Quetta Bears) both made their T20 debuts.

2 March 2010
(Scorecard)

| Peshawar Panthers; 117 (20 overs) | v | Lahore Lions; 121/3 (12.4 overs) |
| Mohammad Idrees 30 (33); Aizaz Cheema 4/18 [4] | | Salman Butt 47* (26); Riaz Afridi 2/18 [3] |

Lahore Lions won by 7 wickets
National Stadium, Karachi, Sindh
Umpires: Saleem Badar and Shakeel Khan
Player of the match: Aizaz Cheema (Lahore Lions)

- Lahore Lions won the toss and chose to field.

3 March 2010
(Scorecard)

| Peshawar Panthers; 150/6 (20 overs) | v | Quetta Bears; 120 (18.2 overs) |
| Jannisar Khan 55* (42); Shoaib Khan jnr 3/36 [4] | | Taimur Siddiq 32 (19); Jannisar Khan 4/16 [4] |

Peshawar Panthers won by 30 runs
National Stadium, Karachi, Sindh
Umpires: Ahsan Raza and Rasheed Bhatti
Player of the match: Jannisar Khan (Quetta Bears)

- Peshawar Panthers won the toss and chose to bat.
- Adil Amin and Mohammad Asif (Peshawar Panthers) both made their T20 debuts.

4 March 2010
(Scorecard)

| Lahore Lions; 166/7 (20 overs) | v | Multan Tigers; 164/7 (20 overs) |
| Umar Akmal 64* (41); Zulfiqar Babar 3/22 [4] Mohammad Irfan 3/34 [4] | | Kashif Naved 58 (42); Waqas Ahmed 4/22 [3] Aizaz Cheema 2/24 [4] |

Lahore Lions won by 2 runs
National Stadium, Karachi, Sindh
Umpires: Iqbal Butt and Shakeel Khan
Player of the match: Umar Akmal (Lahore Lions)

- Lahore Lions won the toss and chose to bat

==== Group B ====
28 February 2010
(Scorecard)

| Sialkot Stallions; 171/7 (20 overs) | v | Karachi Zebras; 167/5 (20 overs) |
| Shoaib Malik 67 (44); Abdul Razzaq 38 (21); Anwar Ali 3/24 [4] | | Khurram Manzoor 74 (67); Faisal Iqbal 58 (34); Mohammad Asif 2/27 [4] |

Sialkot Stallions won by 4 runs
National Stadium, Karachi, Sindh
Umpires: Ijaz Ahmed and Tahir Shah
Player of the match: Shoaib Malik (Sialkot Stallions)

- Karachi Zebras won the toss and chose to field.

2 March 2010
(Scorecard)

| Rawalpindi Rams; 174/8 (20 overs) | v | Karachi Zebras; 163/6 (20 overs) |
| Tahir Mughal 58 (36); Haaris Ayaz 3/20 [4] Danish Kaneria 2/21 [4] | | Khurram Manzoor 53 (43); Hammad Azam 2/23 [3] Raza Hasan 2/37 [4] |

Rawalpindi Rams won by 11 runs
National Stadium, Karachi, Sindh
Umpires: Anis-ur-Rehman and Ghaffar Kazmi
Player of the match: Tahir Mughal (Rawalpindi Rams)

- Rawalpindi Rams won the toss and chose to bat.
- Babar Rehman (Karachi Zebras); Hammad Azam and Raza Hasan (Rawalpindi Rams) all made their T20 debuts.

4 March 2010
(Scorecard)

| Sialkot Stallions; 197/4 (20 overs) | v | Rawalpindi Rams; 180/6 (20 overs) |
| Naved-ul-Hasan 95 (57); Raza Hasan 2/27 [4] | | Hammad Azam 36* (30); Sarfraz Ahmed 2/28 [4] |

Sialkot Stallions won by 17 runs
National Stadium, Karachi, Sindh
Umpires: Nadeem Ghauri and Zameer Haider
Player of the match: Naved-ul-Hasan (Sialkot Stallions)

- Sialkot Stallions won the toss and chose to bat

==== Group C ====
1 March 2010
(Scorecard)

| Faisalabad Wolves; 165/7 (20 overs) | v | Abbottabad Rhinos; 75 (15 overs) |
| Mohammad Hafeez 58 (49); Asif Afridi 5/26 [4] | | Khalid Usman 23* (26); Saeed Ajmal 3/4 [2] |

Faisalabad Wolves won by 90 runs
National Stadium, Karachi, Sindh
Umpires: Ahmed Shahab and Qaiser Waheed
Player of the match: Misbah-ul-Haq (Faisalabad Wolves)

- Abbottabad Rhinos won the toss and chose to field.
- Ahmed Jamal, Asif Afridi, Mohammad Naeem (Abbottabad Rhinos) and Ali Waqas (Faisalabad Wolves) all made their T20 debuts.

3 March 2010
(Scorecard)

| Abbottabad Rhinos; 117/6 (20 overs) | v | Islamabad Leopards; 121/1 (16.3 overs) |
| Yasir Hameed 54 (53); Azhar Mahmood 3/17 [4] | | Umair Khan 40* (35); Mohammad Sami 1/23 [2] |

Islamabad Leopards won by 9 wickets
National Stadium, Karachi, Sindh
Umpires: Ahsan Raza and Rasheed Bhatti
Player of the match: Azhar Mahmood (Islamabad Leopards)

- Abbottabad Rhinos won the toss and chose to bat.
- Awais Khan, Gauhar Ali, Mohammad Sami and Sajid Afridi (Abbottabad Rhinos) all made their T20 debuts.

5 March 2010
(Scorecard)

| Islamabad Leopards; 103 (19.4 overs) | v | Faisalabad Wolves; 106/3 (15.3 overs) |
| Faizan Riaz 25 (21); Saeed Ajmal 4/20 [3.4] | | Asif Hussain 44 (39); Shoaib Akhtar 1/21 [4] |

Faisalabad Wolves won by 7 wickets
National Stadium, Karachi, Sindh
Umpires: Nadeem Ghauri and Zameer Haider
Player of the match: Saeed Ajmal (Faisalabad Wolves)

- Islamabad Leopards won the toss and chose to bat.

==== Group D ====
1 March 2010
(Scorecard)

| Hyderabad Hawks; 119/9 (20 overs) | v | Karachi Dolphins; 122/4 (9.5 overs) |
| Sharjeel Khan 39 (38); Fawad Alam 2/20 [4] | | Shahzaib Hasan 46 (21); Zahid Mahmood 1/8 [1] |

Karachi Dolphins won by 6 wickets
National Stadium, Karachi, Sindh
Umpires: Anis-ur-Rehman and Ghaffar Kazmi
Player of the match: Shahzaib Hasan (Karachi Dolphins)

- Karachi Dolphins won the toss and chose to field.
- Mohammad Awais and Zahid Mahmood (Hyderabad Hawks) both made their T20 debuts.

2 March 2010
(Scorecard)

| Lahore Eagles; 159/7 (20 overs) | v | Hyderabad Hawks; 113 (18 overs) |
| Jahangir Mirza 38* (24); Azeem Ghumman 2/22 [4] | | Lal Kumar 38 (34); Imran Farhat 5/26 [4] |

Lahore Eagles won by 46 runs
National Stadium, Karachi, Sindh
Umpires: Islam Khan and Saleem Badar
Player of the match: Imran Farhat (Lahore Eagles)

- Lahore Eagles won the toss and chose to bat.
- Ghulam Shabbir, Nasrullah Memon, Rehan Nizamuddin (Hyderabad Hawks) and Saad Nasim (Lahore Eagles) all made their T20 debuts.

5 March 2010
(Scorecard)

| Lahore Eagles; 120 (18.2 overs) | v | Karachi Dolphins; 124/1 (9.5 overs) |
| Taufeeq Umar 34 (30); Mohammad Sami 3/27 [4] | | Khalid Latif 75* (37); Imran Farhat 1/18 [2] |

Karachi Dolphins won by 9 wickets
National Stadium, Karachi, Sindh
Umpires: Ehtesham-ul-Haq and Kaukab Butt
Player of the match: Mohammad Sami (Karachi Dolphins)

- Karachi Dolphins won the toss and chose to field.

=== Knockout stage ===
Semi-finals

6 March 2010
Scorecard

| Faisalabad Wolves; 211/5 (20 overs) | v | Lahore Lions; 166/9 (20 overs) |
| Mohammad Hafeez 100 (53); Wahab Riaz 3/32 [4] | | Salman Butt 59 (42); Shahid Nazir 2/24 [4] |

Faisalabad Wolves won by 45 runs
National Stadium, Karachi, Sindh
Umpires: Khalid Mahmood and Riazuddin
Player of the match: Mohammad Hafeez (Faisalabad Wolves)

- Lahore Lions won the toss and chose to field.

6 March 2010
Scorecard

| Sialkot Stallions; 149/7 (20 overs) | v | Karachi Dolphins; 142 (18.3 overs) |
| Shoaib Malik 40* (32); Shahid Afridi 3/21 [4] | | Fawad Alam 41 (33); Mohammad Asif 3/37 [4] |

Sialkot Stallions won by 7 runs
National Stadium, Karachi, Sindh
Umpires: Akram Raza and Nadeem Ghauri
Player of the match: Mohammad Asif (Sialkot Stallions)

- Sialkot Stallions won the toss and chose to bat.

Final

7 March 2010 (D/N)
(Scorecard)

| Faisalabad Wolves; 109/9 (20 overs) | v | Sialkot Stallions; 110/5 (16.3 overs) |
| Mohammad Hafeez 29 (23); Abdur Rehman 2/17 [4] | | Naved-ul-Hasan 27 (21); Asad Ali 1/13 [4] |

Sialkot Stallions won by 5 wickets
National Stadium, Karachi, Sindh
Umpires: Ahsan Raza and Zameer Haider
Player of the match: Abdul Razzaq (Sialkot Stallions)

- Faisalabad Wolves won the toss and chose to bat.

== Media coverage ==
- GEO Super (live) – Pakistan
- GEO TV (live) – United Kingdom, United States, Canada, Middle East
