= Hamad Mubarak =

Hamad Mubarak may refer to:

- Hamad Mubarak Al-Attiya, Qatari footballer
- Hamad Mubarak Al-Dosari, Qatari hurdler
- Hamad Mubarak Al-Sabah, Kuwaiti royal and son of Mubarak the Great
