= Sabah Al-Khalid Al-Sabah =

Crown Prince of Kuwait (born 1953)

- Crown Prince of Kuwait
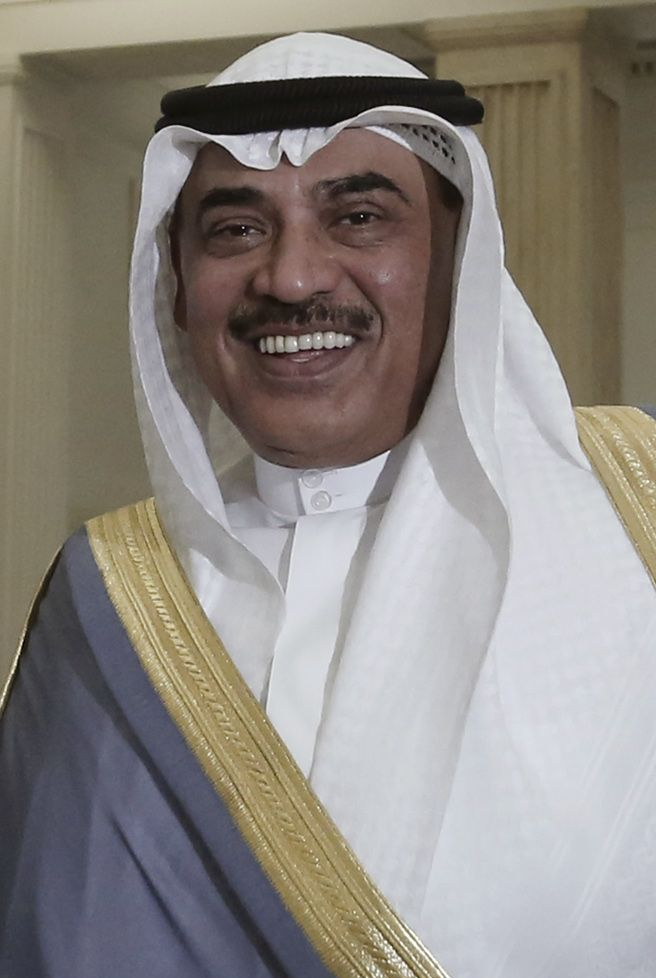
- Sabah in 2014

Crown Prince of Kuwait
- Tenure: 1 June 2024
- Monarch: Mishal Al-Ahmad Al-Jaber Al-Sabah

Prime Minister of Kuwait
- In office 19 November 2019 – 19 July 2022
- Monarchs: Sabah Al-Ahmad Al-Jaber; Nawaf Al-Ahmad Al-Jaber
- Deputy: Mohammad Al Khalid Al Sabah
- Preceded by: Jaber Al-Mubarak
- Succeeded by: Mohammad Sabah Al-Salem Al-Sabah (acting); Ahmad Nawaf Al-Ahmad Al-Sabah

Deputy Prime Minister of Kuwait
- In office 4 December 2011 – 19 November 2019
- Prime Minister: Jaber Al-Mubarak
- Preceded by: Jaber Al-Mubarak
- Succeeded by: Mohammad Al Khalid Al Sabah

Minister of Foreign Affairs
- In office 22 October 2011 – 19 November 2019
- Prime Minister: Nasser Mohammed Al-Ahmed; Jaber Al-Mubarak
- Preceded by: Muhammad Al Sabah
- Succeeded by: Ahmad Nasser Al-Mohammad Al-Sabah
- Born: 3 March 1953 (age 73); Kuwait City, Kuwait
Names
- Sabah Al Khaled Al Hamad Al Sabah
- House: Al Sabah
- Father: Khalid bin Hamad Al Sabah
- Mother: Mouza bint Ahmad Al Sabah
- Education: Kuwait University

Sabah Al-Khalid Al-Sabah (Note: Arabic: الشيخ صباح الخالد الحمد الصباح) (born 3 March 1953) is Crown Prince of Kuwait. A senior member of the Al-Sabah ruling family, he held various government positions from 2006 to 2022, serving as Foreign Minister from 2011 to 2019 and as Prime Minister from 2019 to 2022. He was appointed Crown Prince by his uncle Emir Mishal Al-Ahmad Al-Sabah on 1 June 2024.

== Early life and education ==
Sabah was born on 3 March 1953. He is the son of Khalid bin Hamad Al Sabah and Mouza bint Ahmad Al Sabah, daughter of Ahmad bin Jabir Al Sabah, who was the ruler of Kuwait from 1921 to 1950. He is the brother of Mohammad Al Khalid Al Sabah, deputy prime minister and interior minister of Kuwait. His other brother Ahmad Al Khalid Al Sabah is a former deputy prime minister and defense minister.

He holds a bachelor's degree in political sciences which he received from Kuwait University in 1977.

== Career ==
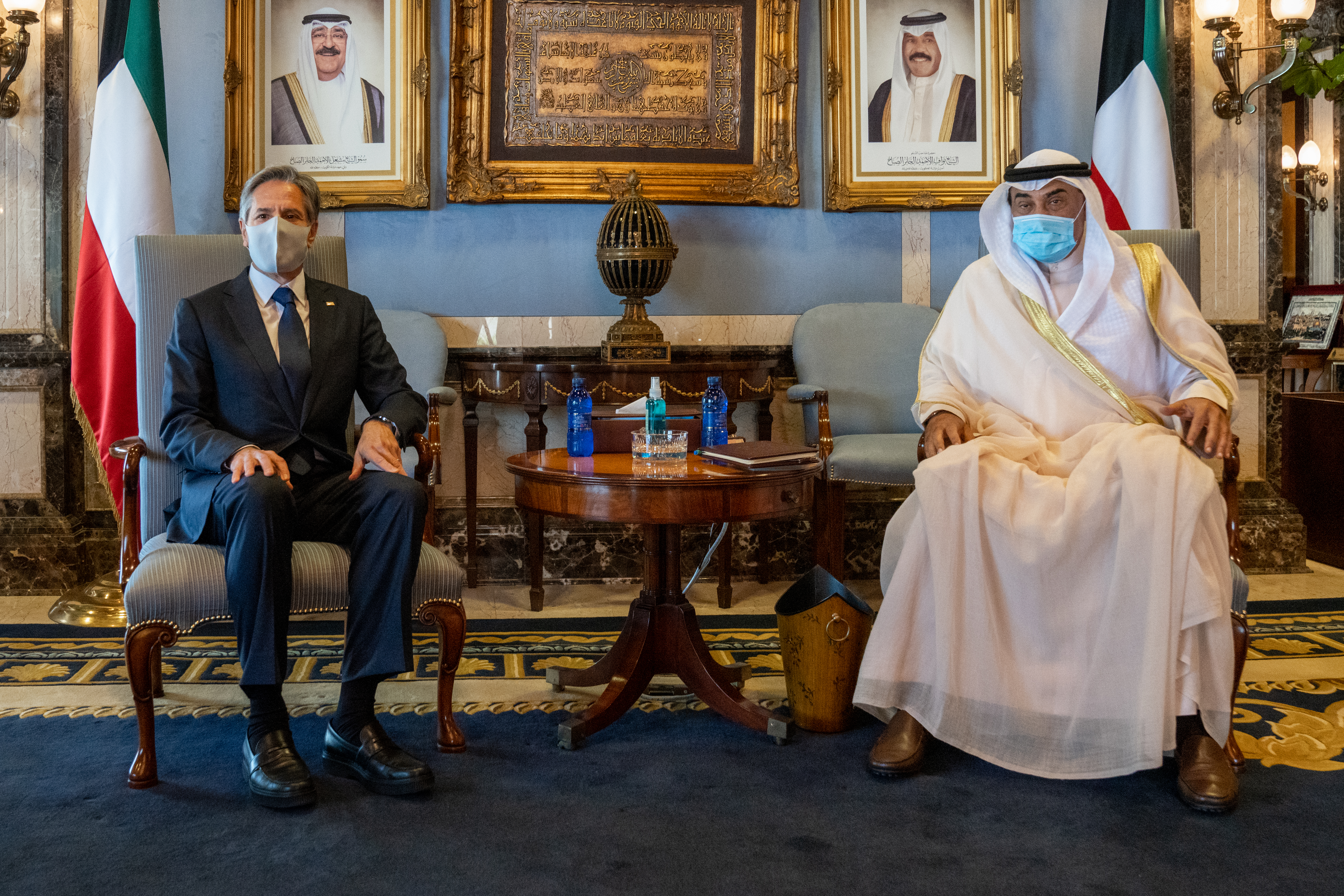
Sabah meets with U.S. Secretary of State Antony Blinken in Kuwait City, Kuwait in July 2021.

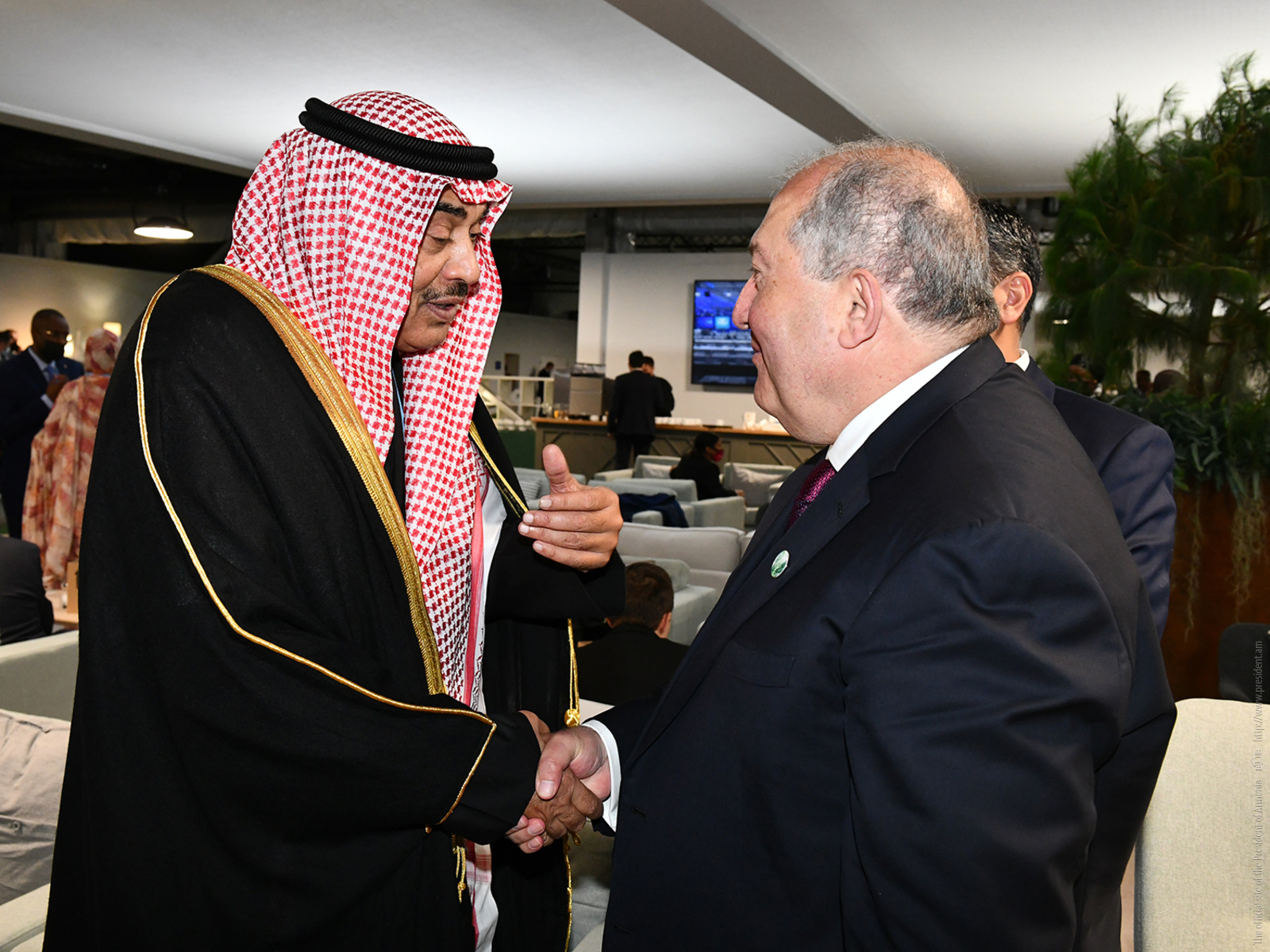
Sabah with Armenian president Armen Sarkissian during the 2021 United Nations Climate Change Conference, November 2021.

Sabah started his career in 1978, joining the ministry of foreign affairs. Until 1995 he worked at the ministry in various capacities, including being a member of Kuwait's permanent mission to the United Nations (1983–1989). In 1995, he became Kuwait's ambassador to Saudi Arabia and served in the post until 1998. During this period he was also Kuwait's envoy to the Organization of the Islamic Conference (OIC). From 1998 to 2006 he was the chief of the national security.

In July 2006, Sabah was given his first ministerial role and appointed minister of social affairs and labor. He was also the acting foreign minister during this period. His tenure as minister of social affairs and labor lasted until October 2007 when he was named as minister of information. Then he was named an advisor in the Amiri Diwan. In February 2010, he was appointed to the Supreme Petroleum Council.

On 22 October 2011, Sabah became both deputy prime minister and minister of foreign affairs. Sabah replaced Mohammad Al Sabah as foreign minister. In a reshuffle of 14 December 2011 Sabah was also appointed minister of state for cabinet affairs. Later this post was assumed by Mohammad Abdullah Al Mubarak Al Sabah. On 4 August 2013, Sabah was made first deputy prime minister in addition to his post as foreign minister.

On 19 November 2019, Sabah became the 8th prime minister of Kuwait through Emiri decree after the resignation of his predecessor Jaber Al-Mubarak Al-Hamad Al-Sabah. He submitted his cabinet's resignation on 5 April 2022, which the emir accepted on 10 May 2022 with a request to remain in a caretaker capacity.

=== Crown Prince ===
On 1 June 2024, Sabah was appointed Crown Prince of Kuwait, marking the first time a member from the Hamad branch of the Al-Sabah ruling family has held this position in the country's history. He is also the first one not from Jabir or Salim after the independence in 1961, and the first one not from Jabir after 2006. However, his mother is from to the Ahmed branch of Al-Sabah ruling family, as she is the sister of the current Kuwait Emir Mishal Al-Ahmad Al-Sabah.

== Personal life ==
Sabah is married to Aida Salim Al Ali Al Sabah and has two children. Aida Al Sabah is the board chair of Sheikh Salim Al Ali Al Sabah Informatics Award.

== Honours and awards ==
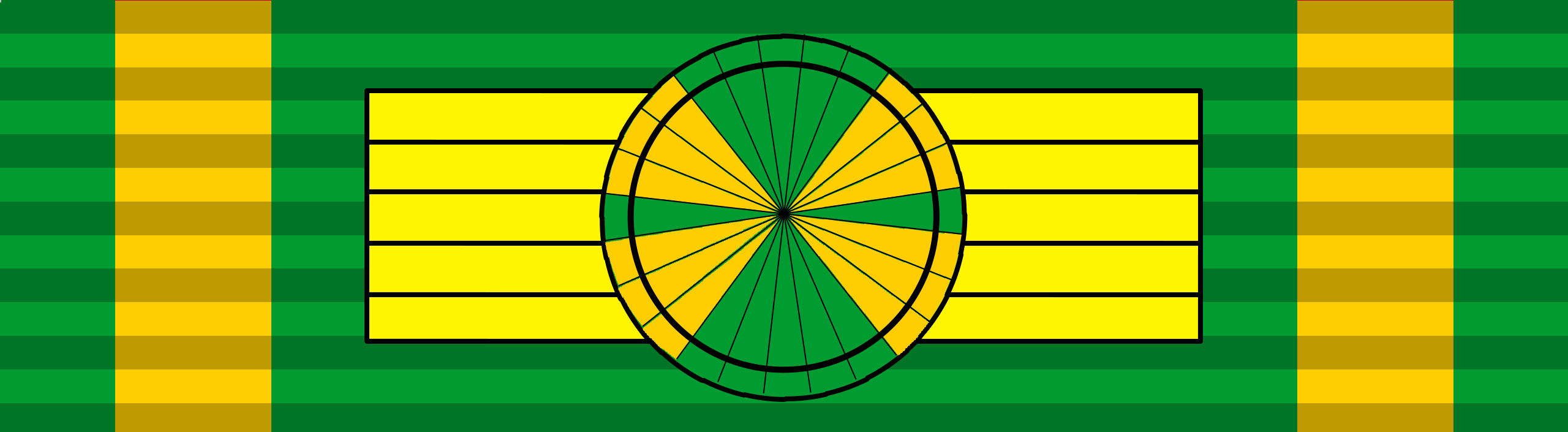
- (Saudi Arabia): Order of King Abdulaziz (1998).
- (Sudan): Grand Officer of the Order of the Two Niles (2012).
- (United Kingdom): Honorary Companion of the Order of St Michael and St George (27 November 2012).

== See also ==
- List of foreign ministers in 2017

== Notes ==
Political offices
| Preceded by Muhammad Al Sabah | Minister of Foreign Affairs; 2011–2019 | Succeeded by Ahmed Nasser Al Sabah |
| Preceded by Jaber Al-Mubarak | Deputy Prime Minister of Kuwait; 2011–2019 | Succeeded by Mohammad Al Khalid |
| Preceded by Jaber Al-Mubarak | Prime Minister of Kuwait; 2019–July 2022 | Succeeded by Ahmad Nawaf Al-Ahmad Al-Sabah |
