= Hamad Al-Mubarak Al-Sabah =

Kuwaiti royal (1894–1938)

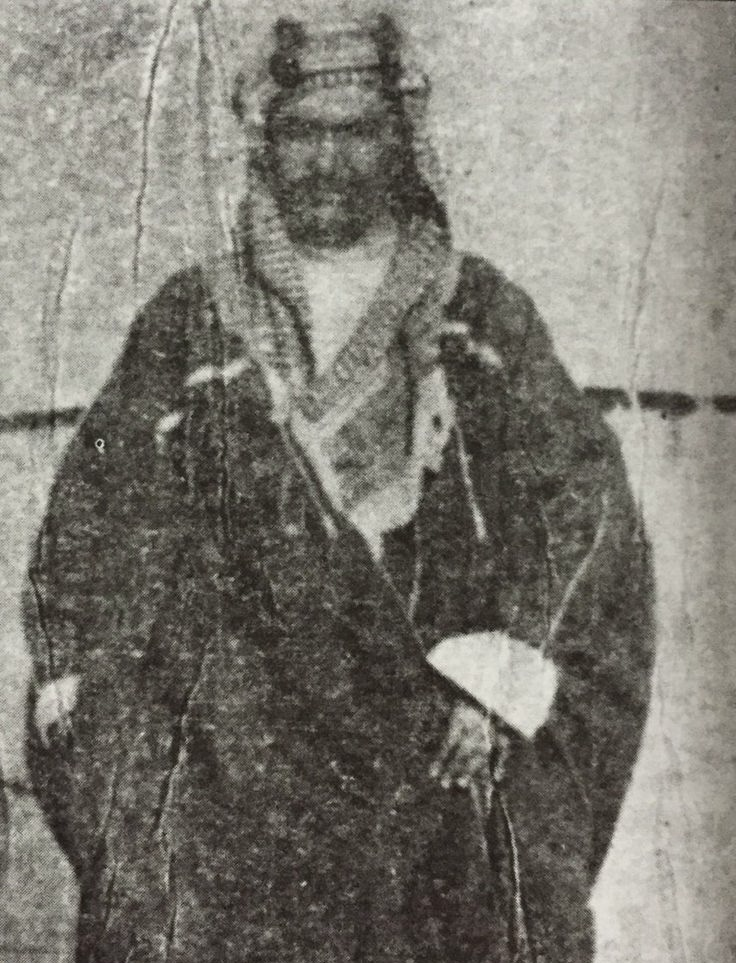
- Born: 1894
- Died: 31 May 1938 (aged 44)
- House: Sabah
- Father: Mubarak I
- Mother: Hessa bint Falah bin Rakan Al-Hithlain

Sheikh Hamad Al-Mubarak Al-Sabah (Arabic: الشيخ حمد المبارك الصباح; 1894 - May 31, 1938) was one of the sons of Mubarak Al-Sabah, the seventh ruler of the Sheikhdom of Kuwait, and his wife Hessa bint Falah bin Rakan Al-Hithlain. He is the progenitor of the Al-Hamad branch of the Al-Sabah ruling family of Kuwait. Sheikh Hamad was one of three candidates nominated by the notables of Kuwait to potentially succeed Sheikh Salem Al-Mubarak Al-Sabah. It is said that he was the favorite child of his father. At his wedding, his father hosted a celebration in Kuwait that was unprecedented in its grandeur during that era. In 2024, his grandson Sheikh Sabah Al-Khalid Al-Sabah became the first crown prince among his descendants.

== Family tree ==
On May 17, 1908, Sheikh Hamad Al-Mubarak Al-Sabah married Sheikha Hessa Sabah Al-Mohammad Al-Sabah. They had several children:

- Sheikh Mubarak, father of Sheikh Jaber Mubarak Al-Hamad Al-Sabah, a former Prime Minister of Kuwait.
- Sheikha Sharifa, who married Sheikh Jaber Al-Ahmad Al-Sabah, a former Emir of Kuwait.
- Sheikh Khaled, father of Sheikh Sabah Al-Khaled Al-Hamad Al-Sabah, current Crown Prince of Kuwait, and of Mohammad Al Khalid Al Sabah and Ahmad Al Khalid Al Sabah, former ministers of defence and interior.
- Sheikh Fahad.
- Sheikha Naseema, who married Sheikh Abdullah Al-Salem Al-Sabah, the first independent Emir of Kuwait.
- Sheikha Nashmiya.
