= The Mountain Beverly Hills =

Undeveloped property in Beverly Hills, California

Coordinates: 34.106°N 118.429°W

The Mountain Beverly Hills, formerly known as The Vineyard Beverly Hills, is a 157-acre (64 ha) undeveloped property in Beverly Crest, California reportedly worth $1 billion.

Princess Shams Pahlavi, the sister of Iran’s last shah, Mohammad Reza Pahlavi, bought it in the 1970s and intended to build the shah a $20 million palace in exile after his overthrow in 1979. It never materialized and she sold it in 1987 to Merv Griffin for a reported $6.5 million. Griffin effectively sliced off the top of the mountain, grading 14 acres and removing about 2 million cubic yards of dirt. He planned an expanse including a 58,000-square-foot house, a helipad and a couple of lakes, but instead found himself busy with other real estate deals, including his 1987 purchase of the Beverly Hilton Hotel and several other hotels. Later, he divided the property into six lots for potential development. In 1997, Mark R. Hughes, the founder of Herbalife, bought the property for $8.5 million after that, it went through a number of owners, following a complex lawsuit after Hughes' death. The property was offered via a website for $1 billion and taken off the market in 2015. One of the owners in 2017 was Victorino Noval.

On August 20, 2019, the property was bought back by the Hughes estate for $100,000 at a foreclosure auction. According to a Los Angeles Times report on the same date, Atlanta investor Chip Dickens "borrowed around $45 million from the Hughes estate to buy the property, and that debt has since ballooned to roughly $200 million with interest and fees. Three years ago, Dickens transferred ownership to a limited liability company controlled by his partner on the project, Victor Franco Noval. Unable to pay the debts, their limited liability company, Secured Capital Partners, tried — and failed — to declare Chapter 11 bankruptcy last month, which led the Hughes estate to force a foreclosure auction to either sell the property in hopes of recouping its losses or buy it back, likely losing the $200 million they were owed in the process. They chose the latter."

== Controversy ==
=== Allegation of purchase by Kuwait government embezzled funds ===
In July 2020, the US Department of Justice filed an asset forfeiture claim against The Mountain Beverly Hills, alleging that more than $100m in Kuwaiti public funds was illegally transferred by former Kuwait Minister of Defense Khaled Al Jarrah Al-Sabah to invest in and buy the asset for his own personal benefit.
