= Khaled Al Jarrah Al Sabah =

Former Kuwaiti deputy prime minister and minister of defense

Khaled Al Jarrah Al Sabah خالد الجراح الصباح
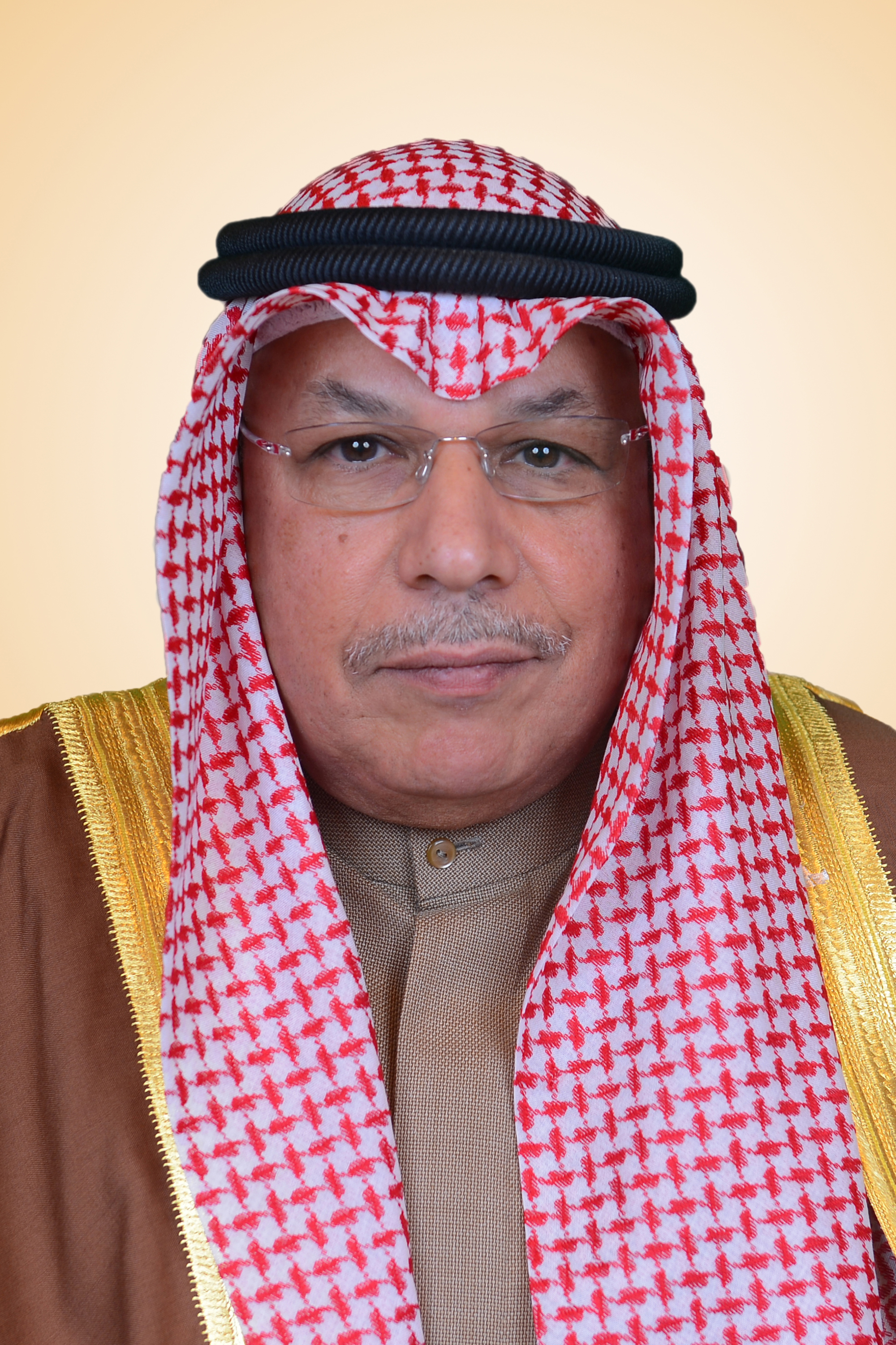

Deputy Prime Minister and Minister of Interior
- In office 11 December 2017 – 18 November 2019
- Prime Minister: Jaber Al-Mubarak
- Preceded by: Mohammad Al Khalid Al Sabah
- Succeeded by: Anas Khalid Al Saleh

Deputy Prime Minister and Minister of Defense
- In office 4 August 2013 – 11 December 2017
- Monarch: Sabah Al-Ahmad Al-Jaber Al-Sabah
- Prime Minister: Jaber Al-Mubarak
- Preceded by: Ahmad Al Khalid Al Sabah
- Succeeded by: Nasser Sabah Al-Ahmad Al-Sabah

Chief of General Staff of Kuwait Armed Forces
- In office 4 March 2012 – 4 August 2013
- Monarch: Sabah Al-Ahmad Al-Jaber Al-Sabah
- Prime Minister: Jaber Al-Mubarak
- Preceded by: Lieutenant General Sheikh Ahmad Al Khalid Al Sabah
- Succeeded by: Lieutenant General Abdul Rahman Mohammed Al-Othman

Personal details
- Born: 1953 Kuwait City, Kuwait

Khaled Al Jarrah Al Sabah (Arabic: الشيخ خالد الجراح الصباح, born 1953) is a former Kuwaiti politician and retired lieutenant general. As a member of the ruling Al Sabah family, he does not belong to the Mubarak branch eligible for the emirate. He served as deputy prime minister and minister of defense from August 4, 2013, to December 11, 2017. Subsequently, he held the positions of deputy prime minister and minister of interior from December 11, 2017, to November 18, 2019.

His career has been marred by legal troubles; in March 2021, the Kuwaiti ministerial court ordered his arrest on charges of embezzling public funds. He was convicted of these charges in November 2023.

== Career ==
Sabah was appointed the Chief of General Staff of the Kuwait Military Forces on 4 March 2012. He held the rank of lieutenant general and retired from the Kuwaiti Armed Forces. He was appointed deputy prime minister and minister of defense on 4 August 2013. He replaced Ahmad Al Khalid Al Sabah in both posts. In 2017 he assumed the role of minister of interior.

In November 2019 he was dismissed after minister of defense Sheikh Nasser Sabah Al Ahmed Al Sabah filed a complaint with the Kuwaiti Attorney General alleging embezzlement of 240 million Kuwaiti dinars ($794.5 million) which had taken place during Khaled's tenure as minister of defense.

In November 2023, Kuwait's highest court sentenced Khaled Al Jarrah Al Sabah to seven years in prison for mismanagement of military funds when he was Minister of Defense.

=== Conviction for embezzlement of public funds ===
In November 2019, Kuwaiti Minister of Defense Sheikh Nasser Al Sabah filed a complaint with the Kuwaiti Attorney General regarding alleged embezzlement of Kuwaiti public funds held at the Kuwait military attaché office in London. Both Khaled Al Jarrah and Nasser Al Sabah were subsequently dismissed in their roles as minister of interior and minister of defense, respectively. The Public Prosecutor in turn referred the report to the ministerial court for investigation, which issued a gag order preventing Kuwaiti media from reporting on the case. In March 2021, the Kuwaiti ministerial court ordered the detention of Khaled Al Jarrah, who was arrested and imprisoned.

In November 2023, Khaled Al Jarrah was convicted by Kuwait’s highest court for embezzlement of public funds and sentenced to 7 years in jail.

=== US Department of Justice asset forfeiture ===
In July 2020, US Department of Justice prosecutors alleged in an asset forfeiture filing that Khaled Al-Jarrah and two others set up unauthorized accounts in the name of Kuwait's Military Attaché Office in London. They then allegedly funded these unauthorized accounts with tens of million of dollars, pounds, and Euros of Kuwaiti public money, and used it for their own purposes. According to U.S. prosecutors, Khaled Al-Jarrah transferred $104 million of the misappropriated Kuwaiti funds to California banks between 2012 and 2015, with some transfers falsely described as for Kuwaiti military purposes. The U.S. claims the money was also spent to buy The Mountain Beverly Hills, as well as a $6 million penthouse, and another $13 million Beverly Hills property, which the Justice Department is also attempting to seize. Victorino Noval and sons, as well as Samir El Mahallawy (who introduced Khaled to Noval) are named in the lawsuit alleging fraud.
