= Hamad =

Hammad may refer to:

== People ==
- Hamad (name), an Arabic given name and surname
- Hamad ibn Isa Al Khalifa (1872–1942), Ruler of Bahrain from 1932 until his death in 1942.
- Hamad bin Isa Al Khalifa, King of Bahrain since 2002.

== Cities and villages ==
- Hamad Town, also known as Madinat Hamad, a city in northern Bahrain
- Hamad City, a housing development and neighbourhood in Khan Yunis, Gaza Strip
- Abu Hamad, also spelt Abu Hamed, a town of Sudan

== Other locations ==
- Al-Hammad, a region of the Syrian Desert
- Hamad International Airport, Qatar's main airport, located in Doha
- Hamad Port, Qatar's main seaport, located south of Doha
- Hamad Bin Khalifa University, a research university in Education City, Qatar
- Hamad Aquatic Centre, a large swimming pool complex in Doha, Qatar
- Hamad bin Khalifa Stadium, a football stadium in Doha, Qatar
- Grand Hamad Stadium, a multi-purpose stadium in Doha, Qatar
- Jassim bin Hamad Stadium a multi-purpose stadium in Doha, Qatar
- Suheim bin Hamad Stadium a multi-purpose stadium in Doha, Qatar
- Mohammed Al-Hamad Stadium, a multi-purpose stadium in Hawally, Kuwait

== Various ==
- Hamad Medical Corporation Qatar's premier non-profit health care provider

== See also ==
- Al Hamed, a town in Egypt near Rosetta
