= Hamad bin Abdulaziz Al Suwailem =

Hamad bin Abdulaziz Al Suwailem is Secretary General of the Royal Court of Saudi Arabia. Previously he had been Deputy Chief of the Crown Prince's Court, under then-Prince Salman and his son Mohammed, and then the Chief of the Crown Prince's Court for Prince Muqrin at the rank of the minister.
