= Junaid Iqbal =

Pakistani venture capitalist and manager

Junaid Iqbal is a Pakistani venture capitalist and manager who currently serves as Advisor to the CEO of Engro Holdings. Iqbal is also the President and Chief Executive Officer-designate (CEO) of Engro Corporation, with the transition scheduled to take effect in April 2027.

== Career ==
Iqbal began his career in media, where he hosted “Power Lunch” on CNBC Pakistan. He has served as the CEO of BMA Financial Services and later as the CEO of Elixir Securities.

Iqbal has served vital roles at Careem, first as the managing director for Pakistan and later he became the managing director and global head of Careem Pay. He also appeared as an investor panelist on Shark Tank Pakistan.

He is the founder of Salt Ventures, a startup investment firm, and Caravan Media, a digital media business.
