= Hamad Jalal =

Emirati association football player (born 1995)

Hamad Jalal حمد جلال
Personal information
- Full name: Hamad Mohammed Jalal
- Date of birth: 7 May 1995 (age 31)
- Place of birth: Emirates
- Height: 1.76 m (5 ft 9 in)
- Position: Midfielder

Youth career
- Al-Shaab

Senior career*
Years	Team	Apps	(Gls)
2014-2017	Al-Shaab		
2017–2019	Al-Dhaid		
2019–2020	Dibba Al-Hisn		
2020–2022	Al Bataeh		
2023	Al Jazirah Al-Hamra		
2023–2024	Al Rams		
2024	Masfout		
- * Club domestic league appearances and goals

Hamad Jalal (Arabic:حمد جلال) (born 7 May 1995) is an Emirati footballer. He currently plays as a midfielder.

== Career ==
He formerly played for Al-Shaab, Al-Dhaid, Dibba Al-Hisn, and Al Bataeh.
