= Mohammad Al Khalid Al Sabah =

Kuwaiti royal and politician

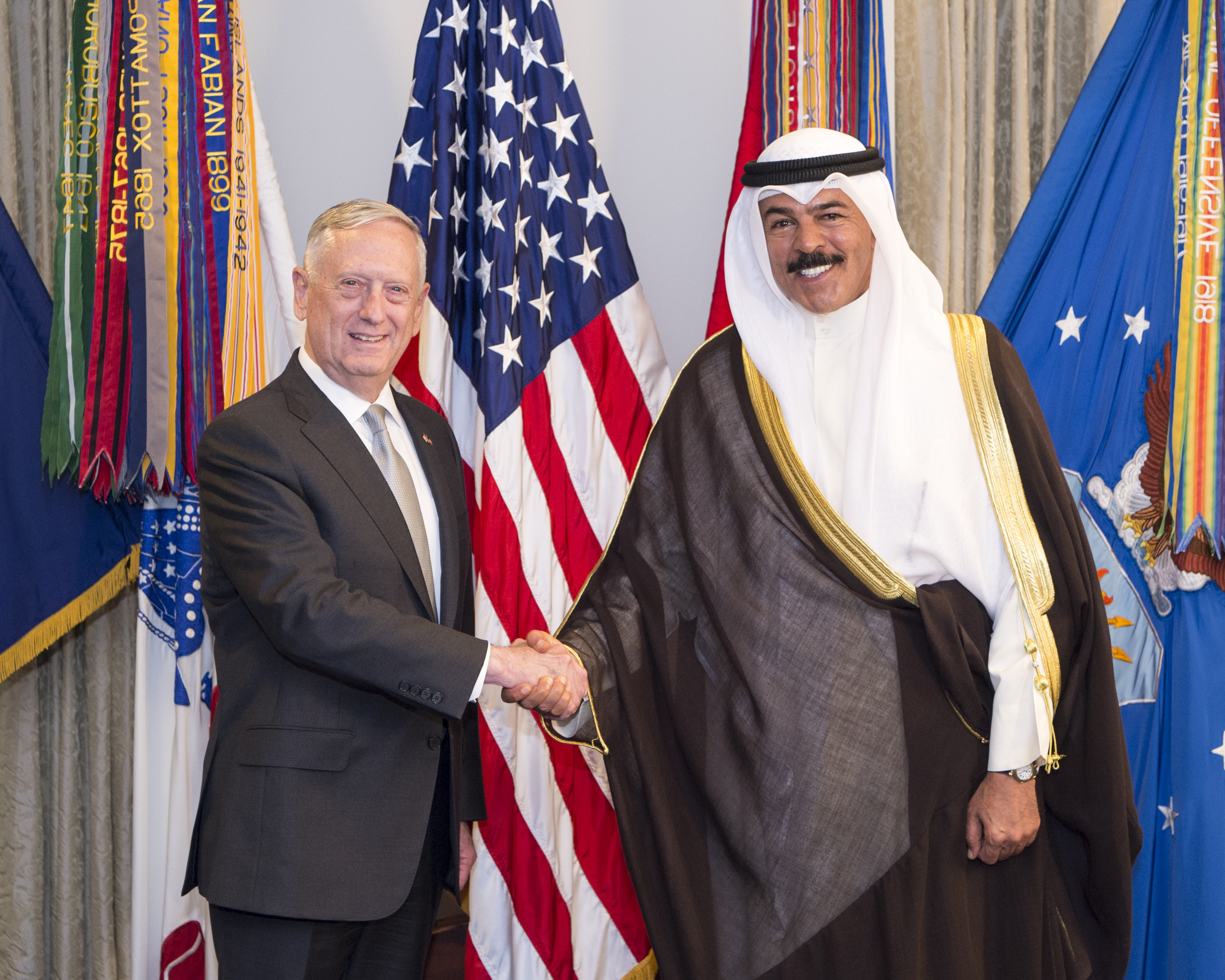

Deputy Prime Minister and Minister of Interior
- In office: 4 August 2013 – 10 December 2016
- Predecessor: Ahmad Humoud Al Sabah (as interior minister)
- Successor: Khaled Al Jarrah Al Sabah
- Monarch: Sheikh Sabah Al Sabah
- In office: 15 October 1996 – 13 July 2003
- Predecessor: Ali Sabah Al Salem
- Successor: Nawaf Al-Ahmad Al-Jaber Al-Sabah

Deputy Prime Minister and Minister of Defense
- In office: 10 December 2016–14 December 2017
- Predecessor: Khaled Al Jarrah Al Sabah
- Successor: Nasser Sabah Al Ahmed Al Sabah
- Born: 1955 (age 70–71)
- House: House of Sabah
- Father: Khalid bin Hamad Al Sabah
- Mother: Mouza bint Ahmad Al Sabah

Mohammad Al Khalid Al Sabah (Arabic: الشيخ محمد الخالد الحمد الصباح, born 1955) is a Kuwaiti politician. He was deputy prime minister twice from 1996 to 2003 and in the period 2013–2017 and interior minister (2013–2016) of Kuwait. He was also the defense minister from 2016 to 2017.

== Early life ==
Sabah was born in 1955. He is the brother of Sabah Al Khalid Al Sabah. His other brother Ahmad Al Khalid Al Sabah is the former deputy prime minister and defense minister.

== Career and activities ==
Sabah was the director general of the General Department of Citizenship and Travel Documents. Then he served as the governor of Hawally from 1991 to 1996.

He was appointed interior minister on 15 October 1996, replacing Ahmad Humoud Al Sabah in the post. Sabah retained his cabinet portfolio in the March 1998 and the February 2001 reshuffles. In 2001 he was also made deputy minister.

In March 2003, an unknown Islamist group called for the assassination of Mohammad and other senior interior ministry officials, issuing a fatwa. His tenure lasted until 13 July 2003 when Nawaf Al-Ahmad Al-Jaber Al-Sabah was appointed interior minister.

After leaving office Mohammad was named advisor at the diwan of Amir. Then he served as the president of the national security bureau, internal intelligence body, until 2013. He was also special envoy of the Kuwaiti Amir during this period.

Sabah was reappointed interior minister to the cabinet led by Jaber Mubarak Al Sabah on 4 August 2013. Mohammad was also made deputy prime minister. He replaced Ahmad Humoud Al Sabah as interior minister in December. On 10 December 2016, he was appointed deputy prime minister and minister of defense serving the post until 14 December 2017.

In May 2015, Sabah traveled to Washington DC to renew Kuwait's interest in the release of Faiz Mohammed Ahmed Al Kandari, the last Kuwaiti held in Guantanamo.

== Personal life ==
Sabah married twice and has ten children, a son and nine daughters.
