= Mohammad Idrees =

Pakistani cricketer (born 1993)

Personal information
- Born: 5 May 1993 (age 33); Charsadda, Pakistan
- Source: Cricinfo, 28 November 2015

Mohammad Idrees (born 5 May 1993) is a Pakistani first-class cricketer who played for Peshawar cricket team.
