= Hamad Pasha Al-Basil =

Egyptian political leader (1871–1940)

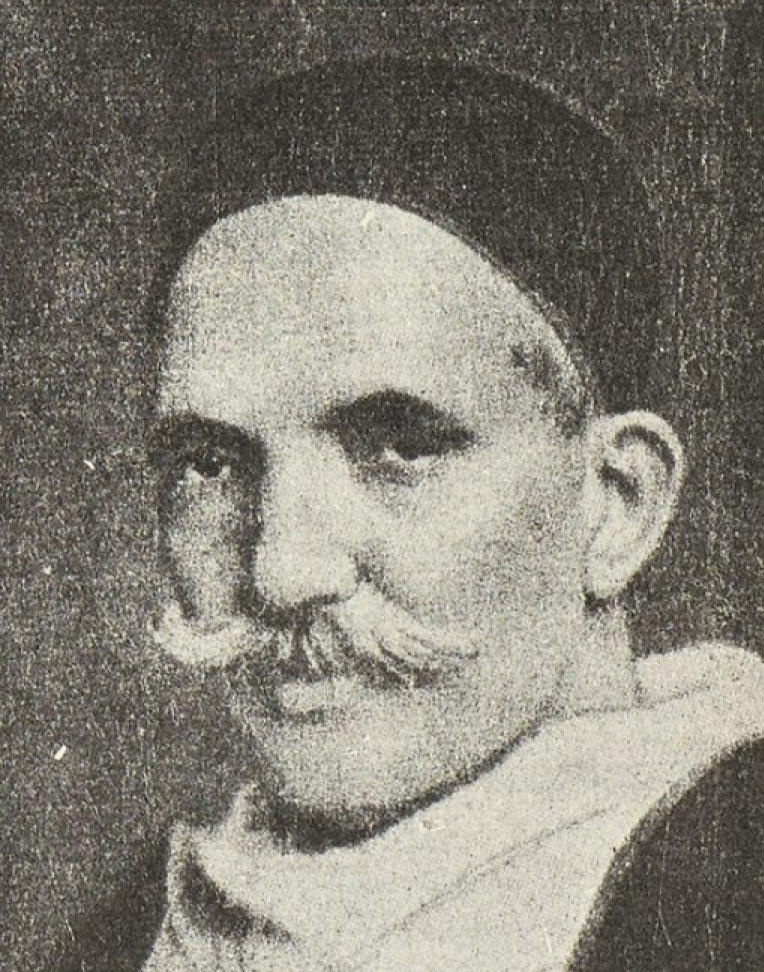
- Died: 1940 (aged 68–69)
- Occupations: Political leader, founder of the Wafd Party, and revolutionary
- Years active: 1909–1938
- Title: Pasha (Given by Abbas II)
- Father: Mahmoud bin Mohammad Al-Basil
- Relatives: Abdelsattar Mahmoud Al-Basil (Brother)

Hamad Pasha Al-Basil (1871 – 1940) was one of the leaders of the national movement in Egypt in 1919. He served as the tribal chief of Al-Rumah tribe in Fayoum, a member of the Legislative Assembly, the deputy speaker of the House of Representatives in 1924, and the deputy of the Egyptian Delegation, and he founded the Saadist Wafd Party.

He was a prominent figure in the national movement before the July Revolution and served as the deputy leader of the Wafd Party under the leadership of Saad Zaghloul and as the deputy in the parliament during the 1920s.

He was exiled along with Saad Zaghloul to Malta and Seychelles, which ignited the 1919 revolution in Egypt, starting from Fayoum, the birthplace of Hamad Pasha Al-Basil, where the first meeting of the Wafd Party was held before traveling to discuss Egypt's cause at the Paris Peace Conference.

He was honored by Marshal Abdel Hakim Amer on orders from President Gamal Abdel Nasser after the revolution, by lifting the guardianship from Al-Basil's properties in recognition of his honorable past.

== Early life and Chieftainship ==
He was the son of the Sheikh Mahmoud Bin Mohammed Al-Basil, of the Rumah tribe which is of Libyan origin. When his father died in 1880, Tewfik Pasha appointed him exceptionally as the chief of Al-Rumah tribe as a reward for his father's services to the Egyptian government. Hamad and his brother would inherit about 4000 acres of agricultural land from their father, which they would focus their efforts on for most of their youth which led them to become very wealthy. In 1894, he was granted the Agha title and later the Mir title. In 1909, he relinquished the chieftaincy to his brother Abdel Sattar and was elected in the same year to the Administrative Committee of the Fayoum Directorate, and in 1911, he was appointed to the Fayoum Directorate Council, being one of the major farmers in Egypt, as even the governor of Sudan at the time sought his advice on agricultural matters. In 1914, he earned the rank of Mirmiran, which is equivalent to a Pashawiyeh, from Abbas II.

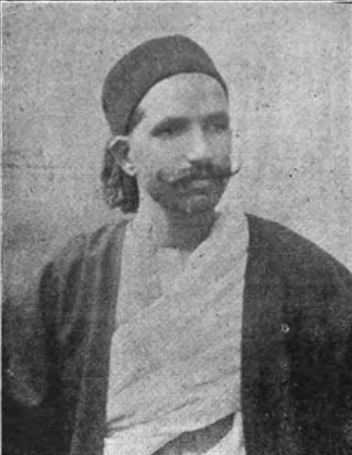
A young Hamad Al-Basil, likely between 1900 and 1910.

In 1909, he and the notables of Fayoum formed an independent parliamentary council due to the absence of a parliamentary council in the country at that time, with the council comprising twenty members with Saudi Pasha as the president and Hamad Pasha Al-Basil as the deputy, among its prominent members was Ali Bek Saleh, the chief of Bani Saleh named after him, and the council was announced on the front page of Al-Ahram newspaper.

In 1913, three members were elected to the Legislative Assembly for the Fayoum Directorate: Hamad Bek Al-Basil, Tantawi Bek Tantawi, and Sheikh Mohammed Ali Saleh.

He helped the people of Tripoli during their migration to Egypt and donated about 500 acres for them to settle on and donated to the Red Crescent Society.

== 1919 Revolution ==
In 1918, Hamad Pasha joined the formation of the Wafd Party under the leadership of Saad Pasha Zaghloul, and after the people authorized the party to liberate the country from colonialism, the British authorities began to tighten their grip on the party leaders, stopping seminars and conferences. Hamad Pasha hosted the leaders of the Wafd at his home on Qasr el-Nil in Cairo, which was close to Saad Pasha Zaghloul's home, now known as the Nation's House.

After the second exile of the 1919 revolution leaders and their trial, Hamad Pasha Al-Basil led the national movement in the southern provinces until he and his seven companions were arrested and brought to trial, resulting in a death sentence that was later reduced to life imprisonment for seven years and a fine of 500 pounds. They were known as the 'Seven Lions,' and were subsequently released due to revolutionary pressure.

== Relations ==
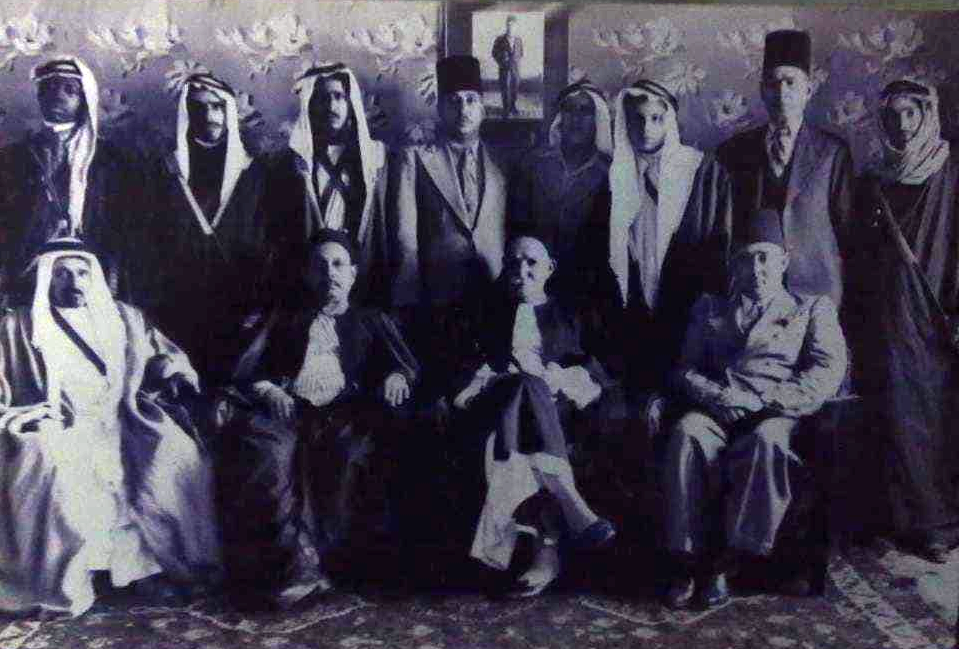
Mithqal Pasha and Hamad Pasha at a gathering in 1935, likely in Jordan.

Al-Basil was a close confidant of Saad Zaghloul and a friend of Mustafa Nahhas. He also had great relations abroad, most notably in Jordan with Mithqal Pasha Al-Fayez of the Bani Sakher. There is a genealogical connection between the Al-Basil family and the Bani Sakher as the later have been nicknamed Al-Basil since the Mamluk age where they were known to frequent Egypt and beyond. Al-Fayez visited Al-Basil in 1931 in Fayoum on a political tour where they famously exchanged gifts, Al-Basil was given the gold sword of Bani Sakher and two thoroughbred racing horses, and gave Al-Fayez a manor house and land in Fayum.

== See also ==
- Wafd Party
- Saad Zaghloul
- Fayoum
- Mithqal Al-Fayez
