= Hammad Siddiqui =

Pakistani politician

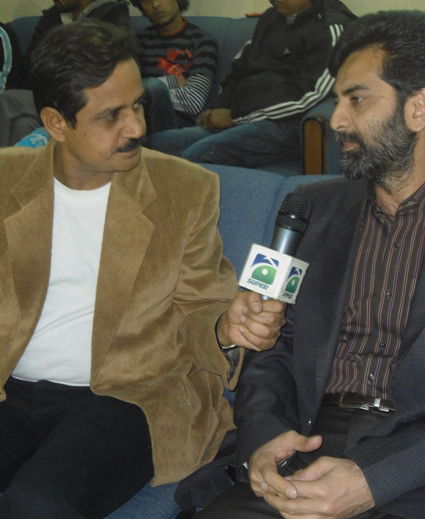
Hammad Siddiqui talking with Geo Super during Shuhada-e-Haq Tape Ball Cricket Tournament 2012

Hammad Siddiqui (Urdu: حماد صدیقی) is a Pakistani politician who served as the in-charge of Karachi Tanzeemi Committee (KTC) of Muttahida Qaumi Movement. The party, which consider herself a secular political party in Pakistan, had its power centered in the largest city and ex-capital Karachi where it has won large number of national, provincial and local body seats till 2013 Elections. Siddiqui is accused of burning an entire factory with 250+ people inside the factory. Who is considered as the mastermind of this incident. It's said that Hammad Siddiqui and MQM Leader Saeed Bharam had ordered the arson attack in Tahir Plaza .

== Career ==
Siddiqui is a central leader of the party's student body All Pakistan Muttahidda Students Organization. He became the head of the Karachi Tanzeemi Committee, a very important and influential body of MQM, in 2009, and kept the position for over four years. His role was said to be instrumental in expanding MQM's influence in Karachi. According to Azfar-ul-Ashfaque of Dawn, as "the longest-serving head of the KTC", he "expanded the committee’s role from a mere post office to an all-powerful body that had a say even in the nomination of party candidates for election to the provincial and national assemblies".

Siddiqui was sacked on 21 May 2013 when Altaf Hussain decided to dissolve KTC for violating party discipline. He shortly left for Dubai and, according to media reports, his sudden departure made the airport agencies "panicking". Political commentator Dr. Shahid Masood argues that Siddiqui's sacking "had sectarian touch to it".

== Baldia incident ==
On 19 December 2016 Rehman Bhola appeared before the anti-terrorism court. He confessed that Hammad Siddiqui allegedly sought extortion and shares in the Baldia Factory, and upon refusal, he decided to punish them. Bhola allegedly claimed that Siddiqui ordered him to set the factory on fire. It was reported that the politician tried to extort Rs 200 million of bhatta or protection money. After the hearing, the ATC also issued red warrants for Siddiqui. The authority is seeking Interpol to arrest Hammad Siddiqui and bring him in the country for further investigation. On 27 October 2017 it has been reported that he was arrested by Interpol in Dubai and Pakistani consulate in Dubai directed to make arrangement to shift him to Pakistan.

== See also ==
- Farooq Sattar
- Ishrat-ul-Ibad Khan
- Babar Khan Ghauri
