= Taimur Khan (Balochistan cricketer) =

Pakistani cricketer (born 1991)

Personal information
- Born: 25 January 1991 (age 35); Quetta, Pakistan
- Source: Cricinfo, 28 November 2015

Taimur Khan (born 25 January 1991) is a Pakistani first-class cricketer who played for Quetta cricket team. In September 2019, he was named in Balochistan's squad for the 2019–20 Quaid-e-Azam Trophy tournament.
