= Ahmad Al Khalid Al Sabah =

Kuwaiti royal and politician

Deputy Prime Minister and Minister of Defense
- In office: 12 February 2012 – 4 August 2013
- Predecessor: Ahmad Al Homoud Al Sabah
- Successor: Khaled Al Jarrah Al Sabah
- Monarch: Sabah Al Ahmad Al Sabah
- Spouse: Wadad Mubarak Al Hamad Al Sabah
Names
- Ahmad Khaled Al Hamad Al Sabah
- House: House of Sabah
- Father: Khalid bin Hamad Al Sabah
- Mother: Mouza bint Ahmad Al Sabah

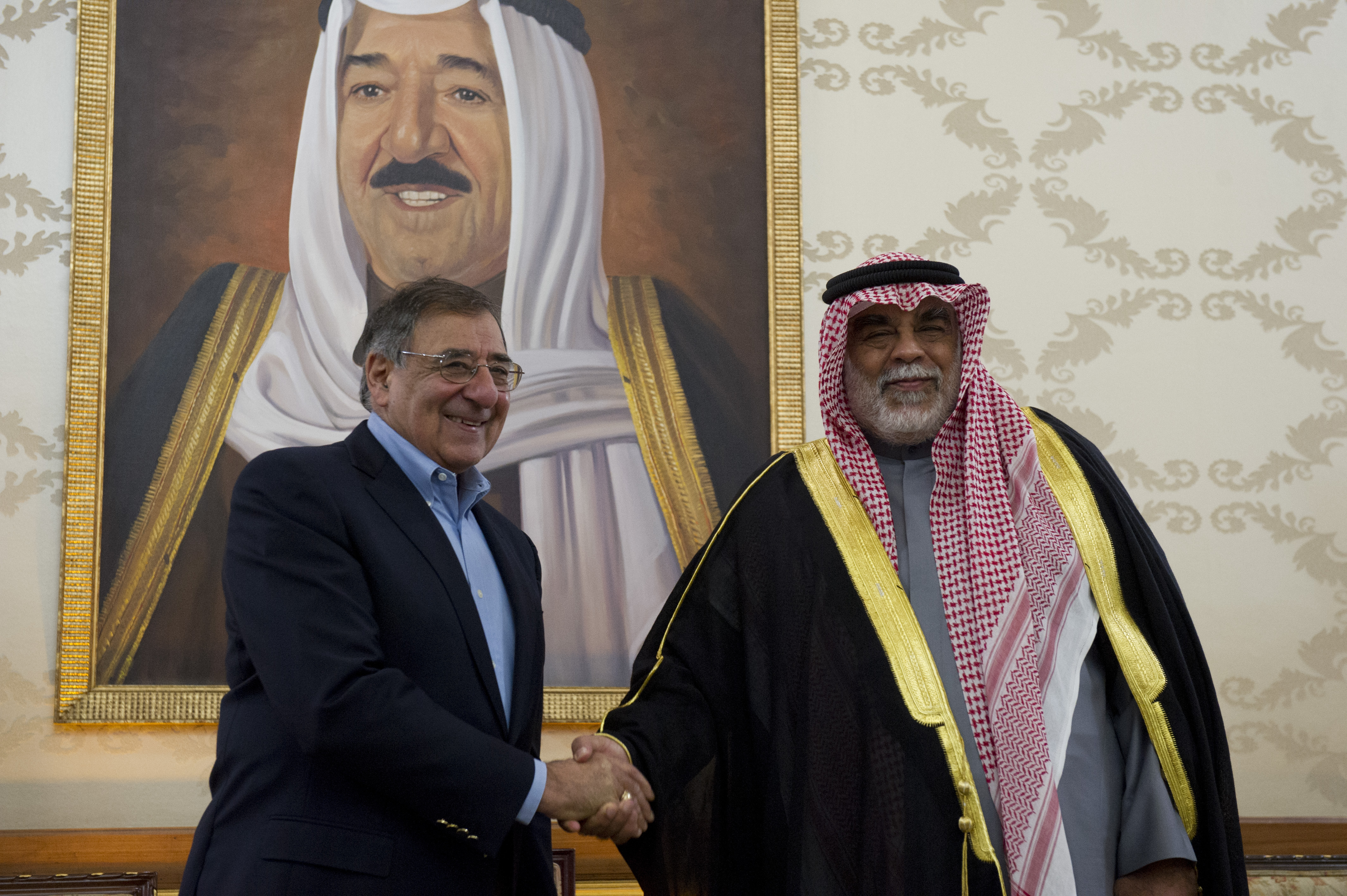
Al Sabah (right) with Leon E. Panetta

Ahmad Al Khaled Al Sabah is a Kuwaiti politician and the former lieutenant general in the Kuwaiti Armed Forces. He served as deputy prime minister and minister of defense of Kuwait from 2012 to 2013.

== Early life ==
Ahmad Al Sabah is the son of Khaled Al Hamad Al Sabah and Mouza Al Ahmad Al Sabah, a daughter of Ahmad Al-Jaber Al-Sabah, who was the 10th ruler of Kuwait from 1921 to 1950. He is the brother of Mohammad Al Khalid Al Sabah, former deputy prime minister and interior minister of Kuwait. His other brother, Sabah Al Khalid Al Sabah, served as prime minister and from 2024 was appointed Crown Prince.

== Career ==
Al Sabah is a military officer with the rank of lieutenant general. He was appointed the 7th chief of general staff of the Kuwaiti Armed Forces in January 2010.

Al Sabah was appointed deputy prime minister and minister of defense on 14 February 2012 as part of the cabinet led by Prime Minister Jaber Al Mubarak Al Sabah. Ahmad Al Sabah's tenure ended on 4 August 2013 when Khaled Al Jarrah Al Sabah was appointed both deputy prime minister and minister of defense.
