= Naushad Irshad =

Pakistani cricketer (born 1993)

Personal information
- Born: 15 December 1993 (age 32); Turbat, Pakistan
- Source: Cricinfo, 28 November 2015

Naushad Irshad (born 15 December 1993) is a Pakistani first-class cricketer who played for Quetta cricket team.
