= Karam al-Hamad =

Syrian journalist

- كرم الحمد
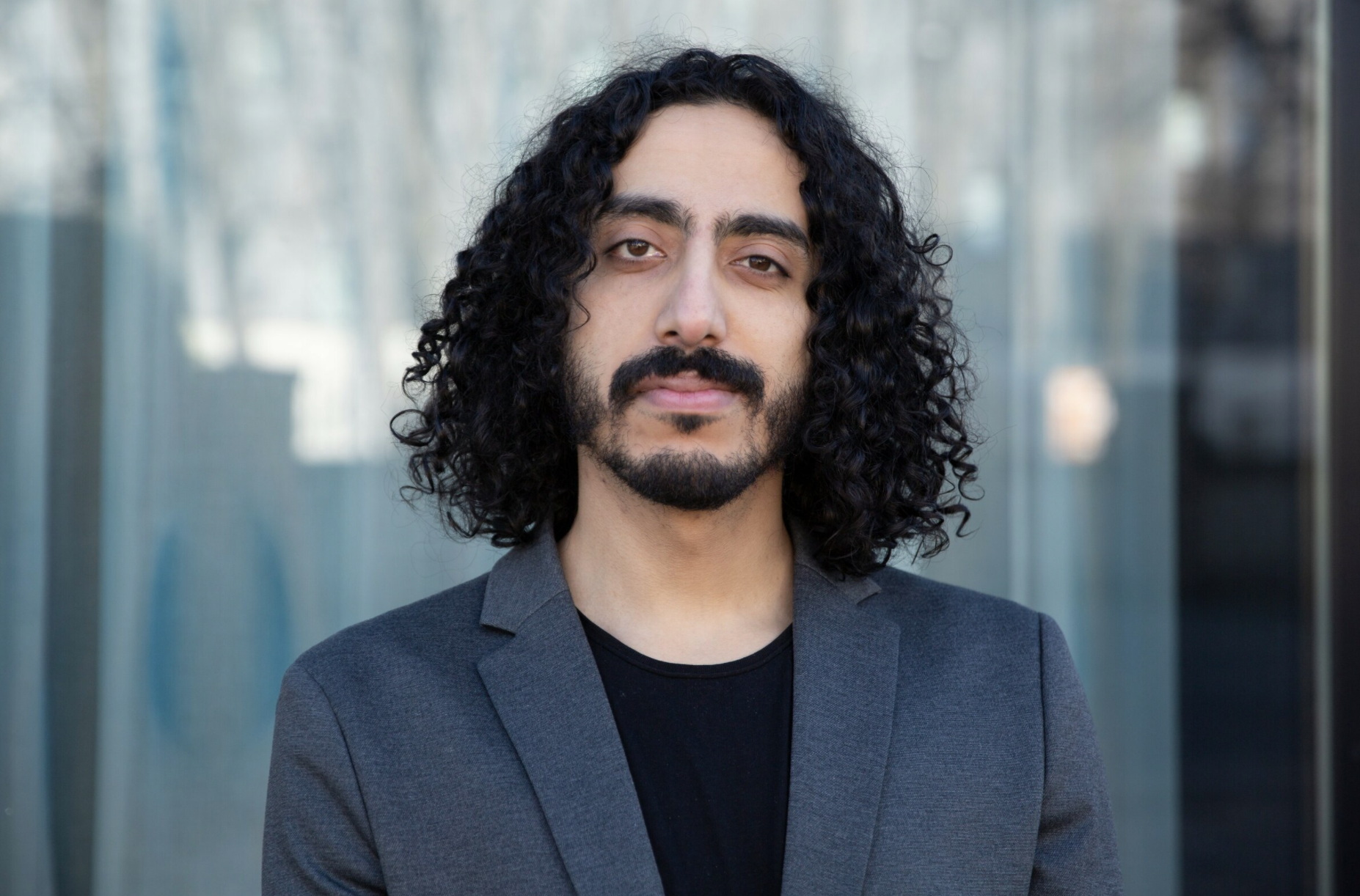
- Born: 1990 (age 35–36); Deir ez-Zor, Syria
- Education: Bard College Berlin
- Occupations: Journalist and human rights activist

Karam al-Hamad (Arabic: كرم الحمد; born 1990) is a Syrian journalist and human rights activist, and former political detainee. Al-Hamad is also known for his efforts to cover the Syrian uprising, including being jailed four times between 2011 and 2014.

== Early life and education ==
Al-Hamad was born in Deir ez-Zor, Syria in 1990. As a child, he was awarded a camera and Internet access for his success in school by the First Lady of Syria, Asma al-Assad.

Al-Hamad studied petroleum engineering at Al-Furat University, but was unable to finish his degree due to his multiple arrests. In 2015, he participated in the Leaders of Democracy Fellowship at Syracuse University's Maxwell School of Citizenship and Public Affairs. Al-Hamad interned at Amnesty International as part of the fellowship. He eventually graduated with a degree in economics, Politics, and Social Thought from Bard College Berlin in 2020. He is scheduled to begin attending Yale University on a scholarship in 2021, studying for an MPP in Global Affairs.

== Political activism ==
During his first year at Al-Furat University, al-Hamad published a magazine on campus containing hidden messages speaking out against the Assad regime. Al-Hamad was arrested for the first time in July 2011 for participating in anti-regime demonstrations. He was arrested a second time and jailed for 70 days after he was accused of leading demonstrations.

By 2013, al-Hamad was also running Deir ez-Zor's media center, an activist organization that helped document the events of the Syrian civil war.

Between his third and fourth arrests, al-Hamad befriended American aid worker Peter Kassig, who was later killed by ISIS.

After organizing protests in Deir ez-Zor, al-Hamad was arrested for the fourth time in 2013. He was accused of spying, detained, and tortured in the Far' Falastin prison after a coerced confession. He was released in July 2014, after which he left the country, seeking refuge in Turkey.

Al-Hamad has served as a member of Deir ez-Zor's local council.

In 2015, al-Hamad was nominated for membership in the Youth Advisory Board for the United Nations Human Settlements Programme, or UN-Habitat.

== Career ==
Al-Hamad's involvement in journalism began when he was still living in Syria. Before the protests, he had worked for the main newspaper in Deir ez-Zor. During the protests, al-Hamad worked with Reuters to publish photos of political demonstrations and the effects of the Assad regime's actions.

After his experiences under the Assad regime, al-Hamad began writing articles about the situation in Syria for outlets such as Foreign Affairs, The Washington Post, The Huffington Post, The New Humanitarian, and Al Bawaba. His articles have also been published in scholarly journals such as the Yale Journal of International Affairs and International Studies Quarterly. Al-Hamad has also been quoted as an eyewitness to the Syrian uprising in news outlets such as Al Arabiya and the Associated Press.

Al-Hamad has also worked as a lead researcher on Eastern Syria, and his research projects have been supported by organizations such as USAID and Harvard University. He has worked with officials in the U.S. Embassy as a research coordinator for Eastern Syria-related topics.

== See also ==
- Human rights in Syria
