= Hamad Al-Hosani =

Emirati footballer (born 1987)

Personal information
- Full name: Hamad Abdurahman Mohammed Al-Hosani
- Date of birth: 15 January 1987 (age 39)
- Place of birth: United Arab Emirates
- Height: 1.75 m (5 ft 9 in)
- Position: Midfielder

Youth career
- 2003–2007: Al-Wahda

Senior career*
Years	Team	Apps	(Gls)
2007	Al Wahda		
2007–2011	Al Dhafra		
2011–2014	Al-Wasl		
2012–2013	→ Al-Ahli (loan)		
2014	Dubai		
2014–2016	Ajman		
2016–2017	Ittihad Kalba		
2017–2018	Baniyas		
- * Club domestic league appearances and goals

Hamad Al-Hosani (Arabic:حمد الحوسني) (born 15 January 1987) is an Emirati footballer who plays as a midfielder, most recently for Baniyas.
