= Hamad Al Kooheji =

Bahraini politician, merchant, and social activist

- Occupations: Politician, merchant, and social activist

Hamad Al Kooheji (Arabic: حمد الكوهجي) is a Bahraini politician, merchant, and social activist. He was sworn into the Council of Representatives on December 12, 2018, for the First District in Muharraq Governorate.

== House of Representatives ==
He entered the political arena when he ran for the First District in Muharraq governorate. In the first round, on November 24, 2018, he received 3,804 votes for 46.23%, forcing a second round on December 1. A campaign was launched against his family on Twitter. In the second round, however, he defeated independent opponent, Muhammad al-Husseini, with 4,171 votes for 53.86%.
