= Hamad Al-Obeidi =

Qatari footballer (born 1991)

Personal information
- Full name: Hamad Mohammed Saud Jaouad Al Abidi
- Date of birth: April 21, 1991 (age 35)
- Place of birth: Doha, Qatar
- Height: 1.64 m (5 ft 4 1/2 in)
- Positions: Defensive midfielder; right-back

Senior career*
Years	Team	Apps	(Gls)
2008–2016	Al Rayyan	23	(0)
2011–2012	→ Al Kharaitiyat (loan)	3	(0)
2016–2023	Al-Sailiya	93	(0)
2020	→ Al-Duhail (loan)	0	(0)
2023–2024	Al-Kharaitiyat		
2024–2025	Mesaimeer		
2025	Al-Sailiya		
2025	→ Lusail (loan)		

International career^{‡}
2010	Qatar U23	3	(0)
2013–2018	Qatar	7	(0)
- * Club domestic league appearances and goals as of 27 June 2023 (UTC) ‡ National team caps and goals as of 27 June 2023 (UTC)

Hamad Al-Obeidi (born 21 April 1991 in Doha) is a Qatari footballer who currently plays for Mesaimeer. He is a graduate of Qatar's Aspire Academy.

== Club career ==
Al-Obeidi began his professional career with Al-Rayyan in 2008. From 2011 to 2012 he was loaned to Al-Kharaityat. In December 2015 he joined Al-Sailiya and was loaned to Al-Duhail in January 2020. He returned to Al-Sailiya in August 2020.

== International career ==
Al-Obeidi has played for the Qatar Olympic football team in the 2011 GCC U-23 Championship.

== Honours ==
=== Club ===
Al-Rayyan

- Emir of Qatar Cup: 2010, 2011, 2013
- Sheikh Jassim Cup: 2012, 2013
- Qatar Cup: 2012

Al-Duhail

- Qatar Stars League: 2019-20

Al-Sailiya

- Qatar FA Cup: 2021
- Qatari Stars Cup: 2020-21, 2021-22
