= Hamad-ul-Hasan =

Pakistani cricketer (born 1988)

Personal information
- Born: 2 April 1988 (age 38); Peshawar, Pakistan
- Source: ESPNcricinfo, 28 November 2015

Hamad-ul-Hasan (born 2 April 1988) is a Pakistani first-class cricketer who played for Peshawar cricket team.
